= 1992–93 Hartford Whalers season =

National Hockey League team season

1992–93 Hartford Whalers
- Division: 5th Adams
- Conference: 11th Wales
- 1992–93 record: 26–52–6
- Home record: 12–25–5
- Road record: 14–27–1
- Goals for: 284
- Goals against: 369

Team information
- General manager: Brian Burke
- Coach: Paul Holmgren
- Captain: Pat Verbeek
- Alternate captains: John Cullen (Oct.–Nov.); Randy Ladouceur
- Arena: Hartford Civic Center
- Average attendance: 10,144 (64.9%)
- Minor league affiliates: Springfield Indians (AHL); Louisville IceHawks (ECHL); Chatham Wheels (CoHL)

Team leaders
- Goals: Geoff Sanderson (46)
- Assists: Andrew Cassels (64)
- Points: Geoff Sanderson (89)
- Penalty minutes: Nick Kypreos (325)
- Plus/minus: Terry Yake (+3); Jim Agnew (+3)
- Wins: Sean Burke (16)
- Goals against average: Mario Gosselin (3.94)

The 1992–93 Hartford Whalers season was the Whalers' 14th season in the National Hockey League. The Whalers finished 5th in the division, and 11th in the conference, and failed to make the playoffs for the first time since 1985.

== Offseason ==
On May 12, 1992, the Whalers announced that general manager Eddie Johnston would not return to the club after three seasons. During his tenure, the Whalers posted a 95–112–33 record as they qualified for the post-season in each season.

Two weeks later, on May 26, Hartford announced that Brian Burke was hired as the new general manager. Burke had worked with the Vancouver Canucks as the director of hockey operations since the 1987–88 season. As a player, Burke played with the Springfield Indians and Maine Mariners in the American Hockey League from 1976 to 1978. Burke also played with Providence College from 1973 to 1977 — in 112 games, he scored 21 goals and 38 points. Following his hockey career, Burke attended Harvard Law School, where he graduated with a Juris Doctor in 1981.

On June 13, the club traded Brad Shaw to the New Jersey Devils in exchange for cash considerations. In 62 games with Hartford during the 1991–92 season, Shaw scored 3 goals and 25 points.

Two days later, on June 15, the Whalers fired head coach Jim Roberts after one season with the club. Roberts led the Whalers to a 26–41–13 record in 1991–92, helping the club reach the playoffs. In the playoffs, the Whalers lost to the Montreal Canadiens in a thrilling seven-game series. The club announced that Paul Holmgren would take over the head coaching duties from Roberts. Holmgren was the head coach of the Philadelphia Flyers from the 1988–89 season until he was fired 24 games into the 1991–92 season after the club began the season with a record of 8–14–2. In 264 career games, Holmgren posted a record of 107–126–31. In the 1988–89 season, Holmgren led the Flyers to the Wales Conference finals.

On the same day, the club acquired Nick Kypreos from the Washington Capitals in exchange for Tim Hunter and Yvon Corriveau. In 65 games during the 1991–92 season, Kypreos scored 4 goals and 10 points while accumulating 206 penalty minutes. The Whalers also acquired Allen Pedersen in a trade with the Minnesota North Stars in exchange for the Whalers' sixth-round pick in the 1993 NHL entry draft. In 29 games during the 1990–91 season, Pedersen earned one assist.

On June 18, the Whalers lost Peter Sidorkiewicz and Blair Atcheynum to the Ottawa Senators at the 1992 NHL expansion draft. Sidorkiewicz posted a 9–19–6 record with a 3.34 GAA and a .882 save percentage with the Whalers in 1991–92, while Atcheynum scored 16 goals and 37 points in 62 games with the Springfield Indians of the AHL during the 1991–92 season.

The Whalers participated in the 1992 NHL entry draft held at the Montreal Forum in Montreal on June 20. With their first round selection, ninth overall, Hartford selected Robert Petrovicky from Dukla Trenčín of the Czechoslovak First Ice Hockey League. In 33 games, Petrovicky scored 17 goals and 42 points with the club. In the second round, with the 47th overall selection, the Whalers selected Andrei Nikolishin from Dynamo Moscow of the Soviet Championship League. In six games, Nikolishin scored one goal during the 1991–92 season. He played a majority of the season with Dynamo Moscow II, where he scored 22 goals and 37 points in 36 games. Other players the Whalers selected in the draft that would play in the NHL include Jan Vopat, Kevin Smyth, Jason McBain, Ken Belanger and Steven Halko.

On June 29, the Whalers announced that Mikael Andersson would be leaving the club, as he agreed to a contract as a free agent with the Tampa Bay Lightning. Andersson scored 18 goals and 47 points in 74 games with Hartford in 1991–92.

The Whalers announced the signing of free agent Jim Agnew on July 8. Agnew played with the Vancouver Canucks during the 1991–92 season, earning no points and 56 penalty minutes in 24 games.

The same day, on July 8, the Whalers acquired Tim Kerr from the New York Rangers in exchange for a seventh-round draft pick in the 1993 NHL entry draft. In 32 games with the Rangers in 1991–92, Kerr scored 7 goals and 18 points. Kerr played with the Philadelphia Flyers from 1980 to 1991, scoring 363 goals and 650 points with the team in 601 games. Kerr scored over 50 goals in four consecutive seasons from 1983 to 1987, including a career-high 58 goals in a season in which he achieved twice.

On July 9, the Whalers lost free agent Marc Bergevin after he signed with the Tampa Bay Lightning. In 75 games, Bergevin scored 7 goals and 24 points with Hartford during the 1991–92 season.

On August 28, the Whalers were involved in a blockbuster trade with the New Jersey Devils. In the trade, Hartford acquired Sean Burke and Eric Weinrich from the Devils in exchange for Bobby Holik and a second-round draft pick in the 1993 NHL entry draft. Burke sat out the 1991–92 season with the Devils, instead playing for the Canadian national team, winning a silver medal at the 1992 Winter Olympics. In his Devils career that spanned from 1987 to 1991, Burke played in 162 games, posting a 62–66–23 record with a 3.66 GAA and a .876 save percentage. During the 1991–92 season, Weinrich scored 7 goals and 32 points in 76 games with the Devils.

On September 2, Hartford acquired Mark Janssens from the Minnesota North Stars in exchange for James Black. Janssens appeared in seven games with the New York Rangers and North Stars during the 1991–92 season, earning no points. In 55 games with the Binghamton Rangers of the AHL, Janssens scored 10 goals and 33 points during the 1991–92 season. Janssens also appeared in two regular season games with the Kalamazoo Wings of the International Hockey League (IHL), earning no points.

The Whalers traded Kay Whitmore to the Vancouver Canucks on October 1 in exchange for Corrie D'Alessio and cash considerations. D'Alessio had a record of 9–14–2 and a 4.01 GAA with the Milwaukee Admirals of the IHL during the 1991–92 season.

== Regular season ==
Although the Whalers finished last in shots on goal during the regular season (2,192), they scored 284 goals to finish with a 13.0 shooting percentage, good enough for fifth in the league (tied with the Vancouver Canucks).

=== Final standings ===
Adams Division
	GP	W	L	T	Pts	GF	GA
**Boston Bruins**	84	51	26	7	**109**	332	268
**Quebec Nordiques**	84	47	27	10	**104**	351	300
**Montreal Canadiens**	84	48	30	6	**102**	326	280
**Buffalo Sabres**	84	38	36	10	**86**	335	297
Hartford Whalers	84	26	52	6	58	284	369
Ottawa Senators	84	10	70	4	24	202	395

Note: GP = Games played, W = Wins, L = Losses, T = Ties, Pts = Points, GF = Goals for, GA = Goals against
Note: Teams that qualified for the playoffs are highlighted in bold.

Wales Conference
R		Div	GP	W	L	T	GF	GA	Pts
**1**	**p – Pittsburgh Penguins**	**PTK**	**84**	**56**	**21**	**7**	**367**	**268**	**119**
**2**	**Boston Bruins**	**ADM**	**84**	**51**	**26**	**7**	**332**	**268**	**109**
**3**	**Quebec Nordiques**	**ADM**	**84**	**47**	**27**	**10**	**351**	**300**	**104**
**4**	**Montreal Canadiens**	**ADM**	**84**	**48**	**30**	**6**	**326**	**280**	**102**
**5**	**Washington Capitals**	**PTK**	**84**	**43**	**34**	**7**	**325**	**286**	**93**
**6**	**New York Islanders**	**PTK**	**84**	**40**	**37**	**7**	**335**	**297**	**87**
**7**	**New Jersey Devils**	**PTK**	**84**	**40**	**37**	**7**	**308**	**299**	**87**
**8**	**Buffalo Sabres**	**ADM**	**84**	**38**	**36**	**10**	**335**	**297**	**86**
9	Philadelphia Flyers	PTK	84	36	37	11	319	319	83
10	New York Rangers	PTK	84	34	39	11	304	308	79
11	Hartford Whalers	ADM	84	26	52	6	284	369	58
12	Ottawa Senators	ADM	84	10	70	4	202	395	24

p – Won Presidents' Trophy (and division)
Divisions: PTK – Patrick, ADM – Adams
bold – Qualified for playoffs

== Schedule and results ==
1992–93 regular season
October: 3–8–0 (home: 1–5–0; road: 2–3–0)

Game	Date	Score	Opponent	Record	Attendance	Recap
1	October 6, 1992	1–5	Montreal Canadiens (1992–93)	0–1–0	10,184	L
2	October 8, 1992	2–3 OT	@ Boston Bruins (1992–93)	0–2–0	14,448	L
3	October 10, 1992	2–5	Buffalo Sabres (1992–93)	0–3–0	9,680	L
4	October 12, 1992	2–6	@ New York Rangers (1992–93)	0–4–0	18,200	L
5	October 14, 1992	4–1	Ottawa Senators (1992–93)	1–4–0	7,628	W
6	October 17, 1992	3–7	Pittsburgh Penguins (1992–93)	1–5–0	11,103	L
7	October 20, 1992	5–4	@ New Jersey Devils (1992–93)	2–5–0	8,833	W
8	October 22, 1992	5–1	@ Ottawa Senators (1992–93)	3–5–0	10,392	W
9	October 24, 1992	2–4	@ New York Islanders (1992–93)	3–6–0	8,633	L
10	October 28, 1992	3–4 OT	New Jersey Devils (1992–93)	3–7–0	8,207	L
11	October 31, 1992	1–7	Los Angeles Kings (1992–93)	3–8–0	9,244	L

November: 3–8–1 (home: 2–4–1; road: 1–4–0)

Game	Date	Score	Opponent	Record	Attendance	Recap
12	November 3, 1992	3–3 OT	Quebec Nordiques (1992–93)	3–8–1	7,723	T
13	November 6, 1992	2–5	@ Detroit Red Wings (1992–93)	3–9–1	19,530	L
14	November 7, 1992	2–6	Washington Capitals (1992–93)	3–10–1	9,422	L
15	November 11, 1992	3–4	Calgary Flames (1992–93)	3–11–1	10,055	L
16	November 13, 1992	2–8	@ Buffalo Sabres (1992–93)	3–12–1	15,441	L
17	November 14, 1992	0–2	Detroit Red Wings (1992–93)	3–13–1	9,748	L
18	November 18, 1992	5–2	St. Louis Blues (1992–93)	4–13–1	8,740	W
19	November 19, 1992	4–2	@ Ottawa Senators (1992–93)	5–13–1	10,500	W
20	November 21, 1992	2–8	@ Quebec Nordiques (1992–93)	5–14–1	14,445	L
21	November 25, 1992	1–6	Montreal Canadiens (1992–93)	5–15–1	10,609	L
22	November 27, 1992	4–5 OT	@ Boston Bruins (1992–93)	5–16–1	14,448	L
23	November 28, 1992	4–3 OT	Boston Bruins (1992–93)	6–16–1	15,635	W

December: 5–7–2 (home: 3–2–2; road: 2–5–0)

Game	Date	Score	Opponent	Record	Attendance	Recap
24	December 1, 1992	4–8	@ St. Louis Blues (1992–93)	6–17–1	15,173	L
25	December 3, 1992	7–5	@ San Jose Sharks (1992–93)	7–17–1	10,899	W
26	December 5, 1992	3–7	@ Los Angeles Kings (1992–93)	7–18–1	16,005	L
27	December 9, 1992	6–2	Ottawa Senators (1992–93)	8–18–1	8,227	W
28	December 11, 1992	3–9	@ Buffalo Sabres (1992–93)	8–19–1	13,011	L
29	December 12, 1992	1–1 OT	Buffalo Sabres (1992–93)	8–19–2	9,221	T
30	December 16, 1992	6–3	Washington Capitals (1992–93)	9–19–2	8,207	W
31	December 18, 1992	3–4	@ Washington Capitals (1992–93)	9–20–2	15,712	L
32	December 19, 1992	4–4 OT	New York Rangers (1992–93)	9–20–3	14,253	T
33	December 21, 1992	5–2	@ Montreal Canadiens (1992–93)	10–20–3	16,449	W
34	December 23, 1992	3–1	Tampa Bay Lightning (1992–93)	11–20–3	10,740	W
35	December 26, 1992	4–9	Boston Bruins (1992–93)	11–21–3	15,635	L
36	December 27, 1992	2–6	@ New Jersey Devils (1992–93)	11–22–3	14,432	L
37	December 31, 1992	2–6	Quebec Nordiques (1992–93)	11–23–3	9,403	L

January: 3–11–1 (home: 2–4–1; road: 1–7–0)

Game	Date	Score	Opponent	Record	Attendance	Recap
38	January 2, 1993	2–3 OT	@ Boston Bruins (1992–93)	11–24–3	14,448	L
39	January 3, 1993	6–6 OT	Minnesota North Stars (1992–93)	11–24–4	9,094	T
40	January 6, 1993	1–3	Buffalo Sabres (1992–93)	11–25–4	9,235	L
41	January 9, 1993	4–2	Quebec Nordiques (1992–93)	12–25–4	11,265	W
42	January 10, 1993	5–7	Montreal Canadiens (1992–93)	12–26–4	9,938	L
43	January 13, 1993	3–7	@ Montreal Canadiens (1992–93)	12–27–4	16,200	L
44	January 15, 1993	1–3	@ Edmonton Oilers (1992–93)	12–28–4	12,675	L
45	January 16, 1993	3–8	@ Vancouver Canucks (1992–93)	12–29–4	15,615	L
46	January 18, 1993	7–8	@ Winnipeg Jets (1992–93)	12–30–4	7,756	L
47	January 21, 1993	4–2	San Jose Sharks (1992–93)	13–30–4	9,880	W
48	January 23, 1993	2–6	Chicago Blackhawks (1992–93)	13–31–4	13,206	L
49	January 24, 1993	4–5 OT	@ Philadelphia Flyers (1992–93)	13–32–4	17,216	L
50	January 27, 1993	6–5	@ Montreal Canadiens (1992–93)	14–32–4	16,258	W
51	January 28, 1993	2–5	@ Ottawa Senators (1992–93)	14–33–4	10,304	L
52	January 30, 1993	3–6	Winnipeg Jets (1992–93)	14–34–4	12,159	L

February: 3–7–0 (home: 1–5–0; road: 2–2–0)

Game	Date	Score	Opponent	Record	Attendance	Recap
53	February 3, 1993	2–3	@ Buffalo Sabres (1992–93)	14–35–4	13,587	L
54	February 8, 1993	1–3	St. Louis Blues (1992–93)	14–36–4	9,013	L
55	February 12, 1993	6–2	@ Winnipeg Jets (1992–93)	15–36–4	11,535	W
56	February 13, 1993	3–4 OT	@ Calgary Flames (1992–93)	15–37–4	20,015	L
57	February 17, 1993	3–5	Buffalo Sabres (1992–93)	15–38–4	9,124	L
58	February 20, 1993	7–3	Edmonton Oilers (1992–93)	16–38–4	11,676	W
59	February 21, 1993	3–4	Pittsburgh Penguins (1992–93)	16–39–4	13,074	L
60	February 24, 1993	2–5	Philadelphia Flyers (1992–93)	16–40–4	9,524	L
61	February 27, 1993	5–3	@ Quebec Nordiques (1992–93)	17–40–4	15,398	W
62	February 28, 1993	6–7 OT	New York Islanders (1992–93)	17–41–4	9,872	L

March: 5–7–1 (home: 1–3–1; road: 4–4–0)

Game	Date	Score	Opponent	Record	Attendance	Recap
63	March 3, 1993	4–7	New Jersey Devils (1992–93)	17–42–4	8,517	L
64	March 5, 1993	4–2	@ Buffalo Sabres (1992–93)	18–42–4	16,325	W
65	March 6, 1993	5–1	Vancouver Canucks (1992–93)	19–42–4	12,048	W
66	March 8, 1993	4–2	@ Quebec Nordiques (1992–93)	20–42–4	15,030	W
67	March 10, 1993	3–5	@ Toronto Maple Leafs (1992–93)	20–43–4	15,720	L
68	March 13, 1993	3–3 OT	Buffalo Sabres (1992–93)	20–43–5	10,011	T
69	March 16, 1993	4–3 OT	@ Tampa Bay Lightning (1992–93)	21–43–5	10,425	W
70	March 19, 1993	2–5	@ Washington Capitals (1992–93)	21–44–5	15,918	L
71	March 22, 1993	4–5	@ Boston Bruins (1992–93)	21–45–5	13,928	L
72	March 24, 1993	5–6 OT	Montreal Canadiens (1992–93)	21–46–5	10,077	L
73	March 27, 1993	2–1	@ Minnesota North Stars (1992–93)	22–46–5	14,335	W
74	March 28, 1993	0–3	@ Chicago Blackhawks (1992–93)	22–47–5	17,429	L
75	March 30, 1993	1–3	Boston Bruins (1992–93)	22–48–5	14,259	L

April: 4–4–1 (home: 2–2–0; road: 2–2–1)

Game	Date	Score	Opponent	Record	Attendance	Recap
76	April 1, 1993	2–10	@ Pittsburgh Penguins (1992–93)	22–49–5	16,164	L
77	April 3, 1993	7–3	Ottawa Senators (1992–93)	23–49–5	13,005	W
78	April 5, 1993	5–4	@ New York Rangers (1992–93)	24–49–5	17,806	W
79	April 7, 1993	6–1	@ Ottawa Senators (1992–93)	25–49–5	10,439	W
80	April 10, 1993	3–6	@ Quebec Nordiques (1992–93)	25–50–5	15,399	L
81	April 11, 1993	2–4	Toronto Maple Leafs (1992–93)	25–51–5	10,184	L
82	April 13, 1993	3–3 OT	@ New York Islanders (1992–93)	25–51–6	8,381	T
83	April 14, 1993	5–4 OT	New York Islanders (1992–93)	26–51–6	10,915	W
84	April 16, 1993	4–5 OT	Philadelphia Flyers (1992–93)	26–52–6	13,711	L

Legend: W Win (2 points) L Loss (0 points) T Tie (1 point)

== Player statistics ==
=== Regular season ===
Scoring

Player	Pos	GP	G	A	Pts	PIM	+/-	PPG	SHG	GWG
Geoff Sanderson	LW	82	46	43	89	28	-21	21	2	4
Andrew Cassels	C	84	21	64	85	62	-11	8	3	1
Pat Verbeek	RW	84	39	43	82	197	-7	16	0	6
Murray Craven	LW	67	25	42	67	20	-4	6	3	2
Zarley Zalapski	D	83	14	51	65	94	-34	8	1	0
Terry Yake	C	66	22	31	53	46	3	4	1	2
Patrick Poulin	C	81	20	31	51	37	-19	4	0	2
Eric Weinrich	D	79	7	29	36	76	-11	0	2	2
Michael Nylander	C	59	11	22	33	36	-7	3	0	1
Mark Janssens	C	76	12	17	29	237	-15	0	0	1
Nick Kypreos	LW	75	17	10	27	325	-5	0	0	2
Adam Burt	D	65	6	14	20	116	-11	0	0	0
Steve Konroyd	D	59	3	11	14	63	-16	0	0	0
Yvon Corriveau	LW	37	5	5	10	14	-13	1	0	1
John Cullen	C	19	5	4	9	58	-15	3	0	0
Randy Cunneyworth	LW	39	5	4	9	63	-1	0	0	1
Jim McKenzie	LW	64	3	6	9	202	-10	0	0	0
Robert Petrovicky	C	42	3	6	9	45	-10	0	0	0
Dan Keczmer	D	23	4	4	8	28	-3	2	0	1
Doug Houda	D	60	2	6	8	167	-19	0	0	0
Joe Day	C	24	1	7	8	47	-8	0	0	0
Mark Greig	RW	22	1	7	8	27	-11	0	0	0
Robert Kron	LW	13	4	2	6	4	-5	2	0	0
Randy Ladouceur	D	62	2	4	6	109	-18	0	0	0
Tim Kerr	C/RW	22	0	6	6	7	-11	0	0	0
Jamie Leach	RW	19	3	2	5	2	-5	0	0	0
Allen Pedersen	D	59	1	4	5	60	0	0	0	0
Paul Gillis	C	21	1	1	2	40	-2	0	0	0
Sean Burke	G	50	0	2	2	25	0	0	0	0
Chris Govedaris	LW	7	1	0	1	0	-2	0	0	0
Mario Gosselin	G	16	0	1	1	2	0	0	0	0
Jim Agnew	D	16	0	0	0	68	3	0	0	0
Corrie D'Alessio	G	1	0	0	0	0	0	0	0	0
Scott Daniels	LW	1	0	0	0	19	0	0	0	0
Mike Lenarduzzi	G	3	0	0	0	0	0	0	0	0
Barry Nieckar	LW	2	0	0	0	2	-2	0	0	0
Frank Pietrangelo	G	30	0	0	0	4	0	0	0	0

Goaltending

Player	MIN	GP	W	L	T	GA	GAA	SO	SA	SV	SV%
Sean Burke	2656	50	16	27	3	184	4.16	0	1485	1301	.876
Mario Gosselin	867	16	5	9	1	57	3.94	0	499	442	.886
Frank Pietrangelo	1373	30	4	15	1	111	4.85	0	783	672	.858
Mike Lenarduzzi	168	3	1	1	1	9	3.21	0	87	78	.897
Corrie D'Alessio	11	1	0	0	0	0	0.00	0	3	3	1.000
Team:	5075	84	26	52	6	361	4.27	0	2857	2496	.874

Note: GP = Games played; G = Goals; A = Assists; Pts = Points; +/- = Plus-minus PIM = Penalty minutes; PPG = Power-play goals; SHG = Short-handed goals; GWG = Game-winning goals;
MIN = Minutes played; W = Wins; L = Losses; T = Ties; GA = Goals against; GAA = Goals-against average; SO = Shutouts; SA=Shots against; SV=Shots saved; SV% = Save percentage;

== Transactions ==
The Whalers were involved in the following transactions during the 1992–93 season.

=== Trades ===
June 13, 1992	To New Jersey Devils Brad Shaw	To Hartford Whalers Cash
June 15, 1992	To Minnesota North Stars Future considerations	To Hartford Whalers Allen Pedersen
June 15, 1992	To Washington Capitals Mark Hunter; Yvon Corriveau	To Hartford Whalers Nick Kypreos
July 8, 1992	To New York Rangers 7th round pick in 1993	To Hartford Whalers Tim Kerr
August 28, 1992	To New Jersey Devils Bobby Holik; 2nd round pick in 1993	To Hartford Whalers Sean Burke; Eric Weinrich
September 2, 1992	To Minnesota North Stars James Black	To Hartford Whalers Mark Janssens
October 1, 1992	To Vancouver Canucks Kay Whitmore	To Hartford Whalers Corrie D'Alessio; Cash
October 9, 1992	To San Jose Sharks Michel Picard	To Hartford Whalers Future considerations (Yvon Corriveau on Jan. 21, 1993)
November 24, 1992	To Toronto Maple Leafs John Cullen	To Hartford Whalers 2nd round pick in 1993
March 22, 1993	To Detroit Red Wings Steve Konroyd	To Hartford Whalers 6th round pick in 1993
March 22, 1993	To Vancouver Canucks Murray Craven; 5th round pick in 1993	To Hartford Whalers Robert Kron; 3rd round pick in 1993; Future considerations (Jim Sandlak on May 17, 1993)

=== Waivers ===
November 21, 1992	From Pittsburgh Penguins Jamie Leach

=== Free agents ===
Player	Former team
Jim Agnew	Vancouver Canucks
Trevor Stienburg	Quebec Nordiques
Barry Nieckar	Raleigh IceCaps (ECHL)

Player	New team
Mikael Andersson	Tampa Bay Lightning
Marc Bergevin	Tampa Bay Lightning
Daniel Shank	Tampa Bay Lightning
Ed Kastelic	Los Angeles Kings

== Draft picks ==
Hartford's draft picks at the 1992 NHL entry draft held at the Montreal Forum in Montreal, Quebec.

Round	#	Player	Nationality	College/Junior/Club team (League)
1	9	Robert Petrovicky	Czechoslovakia	Dukla Trenčín (Czechoslovakia)
2	47	Andrei Nikolishin	Russia	Dynamo Moscow (Russia)
3	57	Jan Vopat	Czechoslovakia	Chemopetrol Litvínov (Czechoslovakia)
4	79	Kevin Smyth	Canada	Moose Jaw Warriors (WHL)
4	81	Jason McBain	United States	Portland Winter Hawks (WHL)
6	143	Jarrett Reid	Canada	Sault Ste. Marie Greyhounds (OHL)
7	153	Ken Belanger	Canada	Ottawa 67's (OHL)
8	177	Konstantin Korotkov	Russia	Spartak Moscow (Russia)
9	201	Greg Zwakman	United States	Edina High School (USHS-MN)
10	225	Steven Halko	Canada	Thornhill Islanders (OJHL)
11	249	Joacim Esbjors	Sweden	Frölunda HC (Sweden)

== See also ==
- 1992–93 NHL season
