= 1992–93 Pittsburgh Penguins season =

NHL team season

1992–93 Pittsburgh Penguins
- Presidents' Trophy winners
- Patrick Division champions
- Division: 1st Patrick
- Conference: 1st Wales
- 1992–93 record: 56–21–7
- Home record: 32–6–4
- Road record: 24–15–3
- Goals for: 367
- Goals against: 268

Team information
- General manager: Craig Patrick
- Coach: Scotty Bowman
- Captain: Mario Lemieux
- Alternate captains: Larry Murphy; Kevin Stevens
- Arena: Pittsburgh Civic Arena
- Average attendance: 16,105

Team leaders
- Goals: Mario Lemieux (69)
- Assists: Mario Lemieux (91)
- Points: Mario Lemieux (160)
- Penalty minutes: Rick Tocchet (252)
- Plus/minus: Mario Lemieux (+55)
- Wins: Tom Barrasso (43)
- Goals against average: Tom Barrasso (3.01)

The Pittsburgh Penguins were the best team in the NHL during the 1992–93 regular season. Their 56 wins and 119 points earned them the Presidents' Trophy's as the League's top team. Six players reached the 85-point plateau and eight reached the 22-goal plateau. Despite missing over a quarter of the regular season due to Hodgkin's Disease, Mario Lemieux returned later in the year to help the Penguins put together a 17-game winning streak, an NHL record still standing today. They also scored 367 goals in the regular season, which is a team record.

== Logo ==
New logo

The Penguins began a process of rebranding the team under previous owner Edward J. DeBartolo, Sr., culminating in a new logo and uniforms for the 1992–93 season. The Pittsburgh design firm Vance Wright Adams was hired to create the new look, and went through many design variations which included options of changing the Penguins' shade of gold to a metallic gold, a color that would eventually be adopted by the team as Vegas gold in 2000.

The final logo featured the bust of a left-facing penguin, drawn in a stylized but more realistic style compared to the cartoony skating penguin of the previous logo. The penguin's wing is stylized into the shape of a striped triangle, and the body and wing are part of a triangle that is completed by a Pittsburgh gold field to the left of the chest, tying the new logo back to the original and its reference to Pittsburgh's Golden Triangle. Fans would come to refer to the new logo as either the "robo-penguin" (or "robopen" for short) or the "pigeon".

The new uniform designs came down to two sets of finalists - one set featuring the new logo on the front, with pointed yellow shoulders, and the other featuring the logo on the shoulders and diagonal text across the front, recalling the "PITTSBURGH" that appeared across the Penguins' inaugural uniforms, with "PENGUINS" on the white home jersey and "PITTSBURGH" on the black road jersey. The waist and sleeve striping would end up being identical on the final versions of both sets, with the black jerseys' waist stripes being identical to the outgoing jersey's design of a thick white stripe over a thick gold stripe with a thin black stripe in between; the white jerseys featured matching stripes that reversed the black and white stripes. The sleeve stripes were arranged diagonally, pointing downward from the sleeve numbers to the cuff.

The Penguins sought permission to use both sets of jerseys, but were denied by the NHL, so the team opted to split the difference, adopting the white home jersey featuring the logo on front and the black road jersey featuring the diagonal "PITTSBURGH" text. Three decades later, when Adidas and the NHL introduced the Reverse Retro jersey program, the Penguins' retro jerseys would recall the unused prototypes from this redesign, with their 2020–21 uniforms resembling the unused white jersey with some changes, while the 2022–23 uniforms being a straight recreation of the unused black jersey, adapted to the Adizero jersey template.

== Regular season ==
Pittsburgh allowed the most short-handed goals (19) during the regular season of all 24 teams. In addition to tying the Buffalo Sabres for most hat-tricks during the regular season, with ten, the Penguins finished second in shooting percentage, scoring 367 goals on 2,725 shots (13.5%). The Penguins also achieved a feat of 3 goals in 29 seconds during a home game on January 26, 1993.

=== Mario Lemieux ===
It was announced during the regular season that Mario Lemieux had been diagnosed with Hodgkin's Disease. Despite missing 24 regular season games and the 1993 NHL All-Star Game in Montreal on February 6, 1993, Lemieux led the League in plus-minus with +55 and led in scoring with 160 points (a total for which he would win the Art Ross Trophy). At the pace he was scoring goals (1.15 per game) and earning up assists (1.52 per game). In recognition of his dedication and his achievements, Lemieux was awarded the Hart Memorial Trophy as the NHL's MVP during the regular season.

=== Season standings ===
Patrick Division
	GP	W	L	T	Pts	GF	GA
**Pittsburgh Penguins**	84	56	21	7	**119**	367	268
**Washington Capitals**	84	43	34	7	**93**	325	286
**New York Islanders**	84	40	37	7	**87**	335	297
**New Jersey Devils**	84	40	37	7	**87**	308	299
Philadelphia Flyers	84	36	37	11	83	319	319
New York Rangers	84	34	39	11	79	304	308

Note: GP = Games played, W = Wins, L = Losses, T = Ties, Pts = Points, GF = Goals for, GA = Goals against
Note: Teams that qualified for the playoffs are highlighted in bold.

Wales Conference
R		Div	GP	W	L	T	GF	GA	Pts
**1**	**p – Pittsburgh Penguins**	**PTK**	**84**	**56**	**21**	**7**	**367**	**268**	**119**
**2**	**Boston Bruins**	**ADM**	**84**	**51**	**26**	**7**	**332**	**268**	**109**
**3**	**Quebec Nordiques**	**ADM**	**84**	**47**	**27**	**10**	**351**	**300**	**104**
**4**	**Montreal Canadiens**	**ADM**	**84**	**48**	**30**	**6**	**326**	**280**	**102**
**5**	**Washington Capitals**	**PTK**	**84**	**43**	**34**	**7**	**325**	**286**	**93**
**6**	**New York Islanders**	**PTK**	**84**	**40**	**37**	**7**	**335**	**297**	**87**
**7**	**New Jersey Devils**	**PTK**	**84**	**40**	**37**	**7**	**308**	**299**	**87**
**8**	**Buffalo Sabres**	**ADM**	**84**	**38**	**36**	**10**	**335**	**297**	**86**
9	Philadelphia Flyers	PTK	84	36	37	11	319	319	83
10	New York Rangers	PTK	84	34	39	11	304	308	79
11	Hartford Whalers	ADM	84	26	52	6	284	369	58
12	Ottawa Senators	ADM	84	10	70	4	202	395	24

p – Won Presidents' Trophy (and division)
Divisions: PTK – Patrick, ADM – Adams
bold – Qualified for playoffs

== Playoffs ==
=== Patrick Division Semifinals ===
The Devils had been a struggling team prior to the 1992–93 season, and in the first round of the playoffs, they met the Presidents' Trophy winners from Pittsburgh. The Penguins entered the series on an 11-game playoff winning streak, which they extended to a record 14 games in this series.

=== Patrick Division Finals ===
The Isles' improbable upset of the Penguins was capped off by David Volek's series-winning goal at 5:16 of overtime in Game 7.

== Schedule and results ==
=== Regular season ===
1992–93 regular season
October: 8–1–2 (home: 5–0–1; road: 3–1–1), 18 points

#	Oct	Visitor	Score	Home	Record	Points	Recap
1	6	Philadelphia Flyers	3–3 OT	Pittsburgh Penguins	0–0–1	1	T
2	8	New York Islanders	3–7	Pittsburgh Penguins	1–0–1	3	W
3	10	Pittsburgh Penguins	3–3 OT	Montreal Canadiens	1–0–2	4	T
4	13	Buffalo Sabres	5–6	Pittsburgh Penguins	2–0–2	6	W
5	15	Montreal Canadiens	2–5	Pittsburgh Penguins	3–0–2	8	W
6	17	Pittsburgh Penguins	7–3	Hartford Whalers	4–0–2	10	W
7	20	Vancouver Canucks	1–5	Pittsburgh Penguins	5–0–2	12	W
8	22	Detroit Red Wings	6–9	Pittsburgh Penguins	6–0–2	14	W
9	24	Pittsburgh Penguins	4–3	New Jersey Devils	7–0–2	16	W
10	27	Pittsburgh Penguins	7–2	Ottawa Senators	8–0–2	18	W
11	29	Pittsburgh Penguins	4–6	St. Louis Blues	8–1–2	18	L

November: 9–5–1 (home: 5–1–1; road: 4–4–0), 19 points

#	Nov	Visitor	Score	Home	Record	Points	Recap
12	1	Pittsburgh Penguins	5–4	Tampa Bay Lightning	9–1–2	20	W
13	3	New York Islanders	0–2	Pittsburgh Penguins	10–1–2	22	W
14	5	St. Louis Blues	4–8	Pittsburgh Penguins	11–1–2	24	W
15	7	Pittsburgh Penguins	2–4	Toronto Maple Leafs	11–2–2	24	L
16	8	Pittsburgh Penguins	2–7	Chicago Blackhawks	11–3–2	24	L
17	10	Pittsburgh Penguins	4–1	Minnesota North Stars	12–3–2	26	W
18	12	Quebec Nordiques	4–4 OT	Pittsburgh Penguins	12–3–3	27	T
19	13	Pittsburgh Penguins	0–8	Detroit Red Wings	12–4–3	27	L
20	17	Buffalo Sabres	2–4	Pittsburgh Penguins	13–4–3	29	W
21	20	Pittsburgh Penguins	4–1	New Jersey Devils	14–4–3	31	W
22	21	New Jersey Devils	0–2	Pittsburgh Penguins	15–4–3	33	W
23	23	Pittsburgh Penguins	5–2	New York Rangers	16–4–3	35	W
24	25	New York Rangers	11–3	Pittsburgh Penguins	16–5–3	35	L
25	27	Pittsburgh Penguins	4–6	Washington Capitals	16–6–3	35	L
26	28	Washington Capitals	3–5	Pittsburgh Penguins	17–6–3	37	W

December: 9–3–1 (home: 4–1–1; road: 5–2–0), 19 points

#	Dec	Visitor	Score	Home	Record	Points	Recap
27	1	Pittsburgh Penguins	7–3	New York Islanders	18–6–3	39	W
28	3	Pittsburgh Penguins	3–5	Los Angeles Kings	18–7–3	39	L
29	5	Pittsburgh Penguins	9–4	San Jose Sharks	19–7–3	41	W
30	8	Winnipeg Jets	2–5	Pittsburgh Penguins	20–7–3	43	W
31	11	Pittsburgh Penguins	1–2	New Jersey Devils	20–8–3	43	L
32	12	New Jersey Devils	5–6	Pittsburgh Penguins	21–8–3	45	W
33	15	Philadelphia Flyers	2–6	Pittsburgh Penguins	22–8–3	47	W
34	17	Pittsburgh Penguins	5–4 OT	Philadelphia Flyers	23–8–3	49	W
35	19	New York Islanders	4–3	Pittsburgh Penguins	23–9–3	49	L
36	21	Quebec Nordiques	4–7	Pittsburgh Penguins	24–9–3	51	W
37	23	Pittsburgh Penguins	4–0	Philadelphia Flyers	25–9–3	53	W
38	27	Pittsburgh Penguins	4–2	Buffalo Sabres	26–9–3	55	W
39	31	Toronto Maple Leafs	3–3 OT	Pittsburgh Penguins	26–9–4	56	T

January: 8–5–1 (home: 6–2–0; road: 2–3–1), 17 points

#	Jan	Visitor	Score	Home	Record	Points	Recap
40	2	New York Rangers	2–5	Pittsburgh Penguins	27–9–4	58	W
41	5	Boston Bruins	2–6	Pittsburgh Penguins	28–9–4	60	W
42	7	Minnesota North Stars	6–3	Pittsburgh Penguins	28–10–4	60	L
43	9	Calgary Flames	2–3	Pittsburgh Penguins	29–10–4	62	W
44	10	Pittsburgh Penguins	2–3	Winnipeg Jets	29–11–4	62	L
45	14	Pittsburgh Penguins	0–7	Boston Bruins	29–12–4	62	L
46	16	Ottawa Senators	1–6	Pittsburgh Penguins	30–12–4	64	W
47	19	Pittsburgh Penguins	5–2	Vancouver Canucks	31–12–4	66	W
48	22	Pittsburgh Penguins	1–2	Edmonton Oilers	31–13–4	66	L
49	23	Pittsburgh Penguins	4–3	Calgary Flames	32–13–4	68	W
50	26	Washington Capitals	3–6	Pittsburgh Penguins	33–13–4	70	W
51	28	New York Islanders	5–2	Pittsburgh Penguins	33–14–4	70	L
52	30	Philadelphia Flyers	2–4	Pittsburgh Penguins	34–14–4	72	W
53	31	Pittsburgh Penguins	2–2 OT	Washington Capitals	34–14–5	73	T

February: 5–5–1 (home: 2–2–1; road: 3–3–0), 11 points

#	Feb	Visitor	Score	Home	Record	Points	Recap
54	8	Boston Bruins	0–4	Pittsburgh Penguins	35–14–5	75	W
55	10	Pittsburgh Penguins	3–0	New York Rangers	36–14–5	77	W
56	13	Chicago Blackhawks	1–4	Pittsburgh Penguins	37–14–5	79	W
57	14	Pittsburgh Penguins	4–7	Buffalo Sabres	37–15–5	79	L
58	18	Edmonton Oilers	5–4	Pittsburgh Penguins	37–16–5	79	L
59	20	Pittsburgh Penguins	2–4	New York Islanders	37–17–5	79	L
60	21	Pittsburgh Penguins	4–3	Hartford Whalers	38–17–5	81	W
61	23	New Jersey Devils	3–1	Pittsburgh Penguins	38–18–5	81	L
62	25	Pittsburgh Penguins	1–2	Ottawa Senators	38–19–5	81	L
63	27	Tampa Bay Lightning	3–3 OT	Pittsburgh Penguins	38–19–6	82	T
64	28	Pittsburgh Penguins	4–2	Washington Capitals	39–19–6	84	W

March: 11–2–0 (home: 7–0–0; road: 4–2–0), 22 points

#	Mar	Visitor	Score	Home	Record	Points	Recap
65	2	Pittsburgh Penguins	4–5	Philadelphia Flyers	39–20–6	84	L
66	5	Pittsburgh Penguins	1–3	New York Rangers	39–21–6	84	L
67	9	Boston Bruins	2–3	Pittsburgh Penguins	40–21–6	86	W
68	11	Los Angeles Kings	3–4 OT	Pittsburgh Penguins	41–21–6	88	W
69	14	Pittsburgh Penguins	3–2	New York Islanders	42–21–6	90	W
70	18	Washington Capitals	5–7	Pittsburgh Penguins	43–21–6	92	W
71	20	Philadelphia Flyers	3–9	Pittsburgh Penguins	44–21–6	94	W
72	21	Pittsburgh Penguins	6–4	Edmonton Oilers	45–21–6	96	W
73	23	San Jose Sharks	2–7	Pittsburgh Penguins	46–21–6	98	W
74	25	New Jersey Devils	3–4	Pittsburgh Penguins	47–21–6	100	W
75	27	Pittsburgh Penguins	5–3	Boston Bruins	48–21–6	102	W
76	28	Pittsburgh Penguins	4–1	Washington Capitals	49–21–6	104	W
77	30	Ottawa Senators	4–6	Pittsburgh Penguins	50–21–6	106	W

April: 6–0–1 (home: 3–0–0; road: 3–0–1), 13 points

#	Apr	Visitor	Score	Home	Record	Points	Recap
78	1	Hartford Whalers	2–10	Pittsburgh Penguins	51–21–6	108	W
79	3	Pittsburgh Penguins	5–3	Quebec Nordiques	52–21–6	110	W
80	4	Pittsburgh Penguins	5–2	New Jersey Devils	53–21–6	112	W
81	7	Montreal Canadiens	3–4 OT	Pittsburgh Penguins	54–21–6	114	W
82	9	Pittsburgh Penguins	10–4	New York Rangers	55–21–6	116	W
83	10	New York Rangers	2–4	Pittsburgh Penguins	56–21–6	118	W
84	14	Pittsburgh Penguins	6–6 OT	New Jersey Devils	56–21–7	119	T

Legend: W Win (2 points) L Loss (0 points) T Tie (1 point)

=== Playoffs ===
1993 Stanley Cup playoffs
Patrick Division Semifinals vs. (P4) New Jersey Devils – Penguins win 4–1

Game	Date	Visitor	Score	Home	Series	Recap
1	April 18	New Jersey Devils	3–6	Pittsburgh Penguins	1–0	W
2	April 20	New Jersey Devils	0–7	Pittsburgh Penguins	2–0	W
3	April 22	Pittsburgh Penguins	4–3	New Jersey Devils	3–0	W
4	April 25	Pittsburgh Penguins	1–4	New Jersey Devils	3–1	L
5	April 26	New Jersey Devils	3–5	Pittsburgh Penguins	4–1	W

Patrick Division Finals vs. (P3) New York Islanders – Islanders win 4–3

Game	Date	Visitor	Score	Home	Series	Recap
1	May 2	New York Islanders	3–2	Pittsburgh Penguins	0–1	L
2	May 4	New York Islanders	0–3	Pittsburgh Penguins	1–1	W
3	May 6	Pittsburgh Penguins	3–1	New York Islanders	2–1	W
4	May 8	Pittsburgh Penguins	5–6	New York Islanders	2–2	L
5	May 10	New York Islanders	3–6	Pittsburgh Penguins	3–2	W
6	May 12	Pittsburgh Penguins	5–7	New York Islanders	3–3	L
7	May 14	New York Islanders	4–3 OT	Pittsburgh Penguins	3–4	L

Legend: W Win L Loss

== Player statistics ==
Skaters

Regular season
Player	GP	G	A	Pts	+/−	PIM
Mario Lemieux	60	69	91	160	55	38
Kevin Stevens	72	55	56	111	17	177
Rick Tocchet	80	48	61	109	28	252
Ron Francis	84	24	76	100	6	68
Jaromir Jagr	81	34	60	94	30	61
Larry Murphy	83	22	63	85	45	73
Joe Mullen	72	33	37	70	19	14
Shawn McEachern	84	28	33	61	21	46
Ulf Samuelsson	77	3	26	29	36	249
Dave Tippett	74	6	19	25	5	56
Troy Loney	82	5	16	21	1	99
Jim Paek	77	3	15	18	13	64
Paul Stanton	77	4	12	16	7	97
Martin Straka	42	3	13	16	2	29
Bob Errey^{‡}	54	8	6	14	–2	76
Mike Needham	56	8	5	13	–1	14
Mike Stapleton	78	4	9	13	–8	10
Kjell Samuelsson	63	3	6	9	25	106
Jeff Daniels	58	5	4	9	–5	14
Grant Jennings	58	0	5	5	6	65
Peter Taglianetti^{†}	11	1	4	5	4	34
Bryan Fogarty	12	0	4	4	–3	4
Mike Ramsey^{†}	12	1	2	3	13	8
Peter Ahola^{†‡}	22	0	1	1	–2	14
Jamie Leach^{‡}	5	0	0	0	–2	2
Jeff Chychrun^{‡}	1	0	0	0	1	2
Jay Caufield	26	0	0	0	–1	60
Total		367	624	991	—	1,732

Playoffs
Player	GP	G	A	Pts	+/−	PIM
Mario Lemieux	11	8	10	18	2	10
Ron Francis	12	6	11	17	5	19
Kevin Stevens	12	5	11	16	2	22
Rick Tocchet	12	7	6	13	2	24
Larry Murphy	12	2	11	13	2	10
Jaromir Jagr	12	5	4	9	3	23
Ulf Samuelsson	12	1	5	6	5	24
Joe Mullen	12	4	2	6	4	6
Mike Ramsey	12	0	6	6	10	4
Dave Tippett	12	1	4	5	–3	14
Troy Loney	10	1	4	5	3	0
Jeff Daniels	12	3	2	5	1	0
Shawn McEachern	12	3	2	5	0	10
Kjell Samuelsson	12	0	3	3	4	2
Martin Straka	11	2	1	3	2	2
Jim Paek	1	0	0	0	2	0
Peter Taglianetti	11	1	2	3	2	16
Mike Needham	9	1	0	1	1	2
Paul Stanton	1	0	1	1	0	0
Grant Jennings	12	0	0	0	1	8
Mike Stapleton	4	0	0	0	1	0
Total		50	85	135	—	196

Goaltenders

Regular Season
Player	GP	TOI	W	L	T	GA	GAA	SA	SV%	SO	G	A	PIM
Tom Barrasso	63	3701:46	43	14	5	186	3.01	1885	0.901	4	0	8	24
Ken Wregget	25	1367:43	13	7	2	78	3.42	692	0.887	0	0	1	6
Total		5069:29	56	21	7	264	3.12	2577	0.898	4	0	9	30

Playoffs
Player	GP	TOI	W	L	GA	GAA	SA	SV%	SO	G	A	PIM
Tom Barrasso	12	721:41	7	5	35	2.91	370	0.905	2	0	3	4
Total		721:41	7	5	35	2.91	370	0.905	2	0	3	4

^{†}Denotes player spent time with another team before joining the Penguins. Stats reflect time with the Penguins only.
^{‡}Denotes player was traded mid-season. Stats reflect time with the Penguins only.

== Awards and records ==
- Mario Lemieux became the first person to score 1100 points for the Penguins. He did so in a 5–4 win over Philadelphia on December 17.
- Troy Loney set the franchise record for penalty minutes (980). He broke the previous high of 959 set by Rod Buskas in 1990.

=== Awards ===
Player	Award
Tom Barrasso	NHL Second All-Star Team
Ron Francis	Unsung Hero Award
Mario Lemieux	Foodland Leading Point Scorer Award; Pittsburgh Penguins Masterton Nominee; Player's Player Award; Booster Club Award; Hart Memorial Trophy; Art Ross Trophy; Lester B. Pearson Award; Bill Masterton Memorial Trophy; NHL First All-Star Team; NHL Plus/Minus Award; ESPY Award for NHL Player of the Year
Shawn McEachern	Edward J. DeBartolo Community Service Award; Michel Briere Memorial Rookie of the Year Award
Larry Murphy	NHL Second All-Star Team
Jim Paek	Edward J. DeBartolo Community Service Award
Kevin Stevens	Baz Bastein Memorial "Good Guy" Award; NHL Second All-Star Team

== Transactions ==
The Penguins were involved in the following transactions during the 1992–93 season:

=== Trades ===
November 6, 1992	To Los Angeles Kings Jeff Chychrun	To Pittsburgh Penguins Peter Ahola
February 26, 1993	To San Jose Sharks Peter Ahola	To Pittsburgh Penguins future considerations
March 22, 1993	To Tampa Bay Lightning 1993 3rd round pick	To Pittsburgh Penguins Peter Taglianetti
March 22, 1993	To Buffalo Sabres Bob Errey	To Pittsburgh Penguins Mike Ramsey

=== Free agents ===
Player	Acquired from	Lost to	Date
Glenn Mulvenna		Philadelphia Flyers	July 11, 1992
Gordie Roberts		Boston Bruins	July 23, 1992
Dave Tippett	Washington Capitals		August 24, 1992
Phil Bourque		New York Rangers	August 30, 1992
Gord Dineen		Ottawa Senators	August 31, 1992

=== Waivers ===
Player	Claimed from	Lost to	Date
Jamie Leach		Hartford Whalers	November 21, 1992

=== Signings ===
Player	Date	Contract terms
Tom Barrasso	September 3, 1992	5-year contract
Joe Mullen	September 27, 1992	Re-signed
Mike Stapleton	September 30, 1992	Signed
Mario Lemieux	October 5, 1992	Re-signed to a 7-year/$42 million contract
Justin Duberman	November 2, 1992	Signed
Troy Loney	May 25, 1993	Re-signed to a multi-year contract
Bryan Trottier	June 22, 1993	Signed

=== Other ===
Name	Date	Details
Scotty Bowman	May 28, 1993	Replaced as head coach
Jack Kelley	June 15, 1993	Hired as president
Bryan Trottier	June 22, 1993	Hired as assistant coach
Eddie Johnston	June 22, 1993	Hired as head coach
Paul Laus	June 24, 1993	Lost in expansion draft to Florida Panthers
Troy Loney	June 24, 1993	Lost in expansion draft to Mighty Ducks of Anaheim

== Draft picks ==
Pittsburgh Penguins' picks at the 1992 NHL entry draft.

Round	#	Player	Pos	Nationality	College/Junior/Club team (League)
1	19	Martin Straka	Center	Czechoslovakia	Skoda Plzen (Czech)
2	43	Marc Hussey	Defense	Canada	Moose Jaw Warriors (WHL)
3	67	Travis Thiessen	Defense	Canada	Moose Jaw Warriors (WHL)
4	91	Todd Klassen	Defense	Canada	Tri-City Americans (WHL)
5	115	Philippe De Rouville	Goaltender	Canada	Verdun College-Francais (QMJHL)
6	139	Artem Kopot	Defense	Russia	Chelyabinsk Traktor (Russia)
7	163	Jan Alinc	Left wing	Czechoslovakia	Litvinov Chemopetrol (Czech)
8	187	Fran Bussey	Center	United States	Duluth East H.S. (Minn.)
9	211	Brian Bonin	Center	United States	White Bear Lake H.S. (Minn.)
10	235	Brian Callahan	Center	United States	Belmont Hill H.S. (Mass.)

Draft notes

- The Pittsburgh Penguins' 11th-round pick went to the St. Louis Blues as the result of an October 2, 1990, trade that sent Gordie Roberts to the Penguins in exchange for this pick.

== Farm teams ==
The Cleveland Lumberjacks relocated from Muskegon for the 1992–93 season. They finished second in the International Hockey League (IHL)'s Atlantic Division which earned them a playoff spot. They lost in the first round of the playoffs to the eventual Turner Cup champion Fort Wayne Komets.
