= 1992–93 Buffalo Sabres season =

NHL hockey team season

1992–93 Buffalo Sabres
- Division: 4th Adams
- Conference: 7th Wales
- 1992–93 record: 38–36–10
- Home record: 25–15–2
- Road record: 13–21–8
- Goals for: 335
- Goals against: 297

Team information
- General manager: Gerry Meehan
- Coach: John Muckler
- Captain: Mike Ramsey (Oct.); Pat LaFontaine (Oct.-May)
- Alternate captains: Pat LaFontaine (Oct.); Dave Andreychuk; Dale Hawerchuk; Doug Bodger
- Arena: Buffalo Memorial Auditorium
- Average attendance: 14,981

Team leaders
- Goals: Alexander Mogilny (76)
- Assists: Pat LaFontaine (95)
- Points: Pat LaFontaine (148)
- Penalty minutes: Brad May (242)
- Plus/minus: Doug Bodger (+14)
- Wins: Grant Fuhr, Dominik Hasek & Daren Puppa (11)
- Goals against average: Dominik Hasek (3.15)

The 1992–93 Buffalo Sabres season was the Sabres' 23rd season in the National Hockey League (NHL). Three Buffalo players scored at least 20 power-play goals each (Dave Andreychuk, Pat LaFontaine and Alexander Mogilny). Mogilny led all skaters in hat tricks during the regular season with 7, and Buffalo tied the Pittsburgh Penguins for most hat tricks scored by a team, with 10. The Sabres stumbled into the 1993 NHL Playoffs, losing their final 7 regular-season games.

== Offseason ==
On August 7, Buffalo acquired goaltender Dominik Hasek from the Chicago Blackhawks for Stephane Beauregard and future considerations (a 1993 fourth round pick that was used to select Eric Daze).

== Regular season ==
=== Pat LaFontaine ===
LaFontaine exploded offensively in the 1992–93 season with a personal-best and team-record 148 points (53 goals and 95 assists). The 148 points are also the most points ever scored by an American-born player in one season. His play-making ability enabled his linemate, Alexander Mogilny to set a team season record with 76 goals, (both LaFontaine's 95 assists and Mogilny's 76 goals still stand as the Sabres' team records). LaFontaine finished as runner-up to Mario Lemieux in the scoring race and earned a spot on the postseason NHL All-Star Second Team. He was also a finalist for the Hart Trophy as NHL MVP and the Lady Byng Trophy as the most sportsmanlike player.

During the 1993 playoffs, LaFontaine engineered another great moment: in spite of playing with a damaged knee, as well as having fallen onto the ice, he still managed to set up Brad May's overtime, series-clinching goal against the Boston Bruins.

=== Season standings ===
Adams Division
	GP	W	L	T	Pts	GF	GA
**Boston Bruins**	84	51	26	7	**109**	332	268
**Quebec Nordiques**	84	47	27	10	**104**	351	300
**Montreal Canadiens**	84	48	30	6	**102**	326	280
**Buffalo Sabres**	84	38	36	10	**86**	335	297
Hartford Whalers	84	26	52	6	58	284	369
Ottawa Senators	84	10	70	4	24	202	395

Note: GP = Games played, W = Wins, L = Losses, T = Ties, Pts = Points, GF = Goals for, GA = Goals against
Note: Teams that qualified for the playoffs are highlighted in bold.

Wales Conference
R		Div	GP	W	L	T	GF	GA	Pts
**1**	**p – Pittsburgh Penguins**	**PTK**	**84**	**56**	**21**	**7**	**367**	**268**	**119**
**2**	**Boston Bruins**	**ADM**	**84**	**51**	**26**	**7**	**332**	**268**	**109**
**3**	**Quebec Nordiques**	**ADM**	**84**	**47**	**27**	**10**	**351**	**300**	**104**
**4**	**Montreal Canadiens**	**ADM**	**84**	**48**	**30**	**6**	**326**	**280**	**102**
**5**	**Washington Capitals**	**PTK**	**84**	**43**	**34**	**7**	**325**	**286**	**93**
**6**	**New York Islanders**	**PTK**	**84**	**40**	**37**	**7**	**335**	**297**	**87**
**7**	**New Jersey Devils**	**PTK**	**84**	**40**	**37**	**7**	**308**	**299**	**87**
**8**	**Buffalo Sabres**	**ADM**	**84**	**38**	**36**	**10**	**335**	**297**	**86**
9	Philadelphia Flyers	PTK	84	36	37	11	319	319	83
10	New York Rangers	PTK	84	34	39	11	304	308	79
11	Hartford Whalers	ADM	84	26	52	6	284	369	58
12	Ottawa Senators	ADM	84	10	70	4	202	395	24

p – Won Presidents' Trophy (and division)
Divisions: PTK – Patrick, ADM – Adams
bold – Qualified for playoffs

== Playoffs ==
=== Adams Division Semifinals ===
Buffalo's four-game sweep of the Bruins ended with a memorable overtime goal by Brad May at Buffalo's Memorial Auditorium, leading to Sabres' play-by-play announcer Rick Jeanneret's famous "May Day! May Day! May Day!" call.

=== Adams Division Finals ===
The long-awaited series between Patrick Roy and Grant Fuhr had finally arrived. The Canadiens swept the series, winning every game by a score of 4–3; three of the four games in overtime.

== Schedule and results ==
=== Regular season ===
1992–93 regular season
October: 6–3–2 (home: 5–1–0; road: 1–2–2)

Game	Date	Score	Opponent	Record	Recap
1	October 8, 1992	4–5	Quebec Nordiques (1992–93)	0–1–0	L
2	October 10, 1992	5–2	@ Hartford Whalers (1992–93)	1–1–0	W
3	October 11, 1992	8–2	Montreal Canadiens (1992–93)	2–1–0	W
4	October 13, 1992	5–6	@ Pittsburgh Penguins (1992–93)	2–2–0	L
5	October 16, 1992	5–4 OT	Tampa Bay Lightning (1992–93)	3–2–0	W
6	October 17, 1992	4–6	@ Washington Capitals (1992–93)	3–3–0	L
7	October 21, 1992	4–1	Chicago Blackhawks (1992–93)	4–3–0	W
8	October 23, 1992	5–4	San Jose Sharks (1992–93)	5–3–0	W
9	October 28, 1992	4–4 OT	@ Toronto Maple Leafs (1992–93)	5–3–1	T
10	October 30, 1992	12–3	Ottawa Senators (1992–93)	6–3–1	W
11	October 31, 1992	2–2 OT	@ Ottawa Senators (1992–93)	6–3–2	T

November: 4–8–2 (home: 3–1–1; road: 1–7–1)

Game	Date	Score	Opponent	Record	Recap
12	November 2, 1992	6–7 OT	@ New York Rangers (1992–93)	6–4–2	L
13	November 5, 1992	5–7	@ San Jose Sharks (1992–93)	6–5–2	L
14	November 7, 1992	2–5	@ Los Angeles Kings (1992–93)	6–6–2	L
15	November 11, 1992	7–2	Boston Bruins (1992–93)	7–6–2	W
16	November 13, 1992	8–2	Hartford Whalers (1992–93)	8–6–2	W
17	November 14, 1992	5–7	@ New York Islanders (1992–93)	8–7–2	L
18	November 17, 1992	2–4	@ Pittsburgh Penguins (1992–93)	8–8–2	L
19	November 18, 1992	2–3	@ New Jersey Devils (1992–93)	8–9–2	L
20	November 21, 1992	3–4	Minnesota North Stars (1992–93)	8–10–2	L
21	November 22, 1992	4–4 OT	@ Philadelphia Flyers (1992–93)	8–10–3	T
22	November 25, 1992	1–1 OT	Quebec Nordiques (1992–93)	8–10–4	T
23	November 27, 1992	4–1	Ottawa Senators (1992–93)	9–10–4	W
24	November 29, 1992	5–2	@ Ottawa Senators (1992–93)	10–10–4	W
25	November 30, 1992	0–3	@ Montreal Canadiens (1992–93)	10–11–4	L

December: 6–4–2 (home: 5–2–1; road: 1–2–1)

Game	Date	Score	Opponent	Record	Recap
26	December 4, 1992	5–5 OT	New York Islanders (1992–93)	10–11–5	T
27	December 6, 1992	3–7	New Jersey Devils (1992–93)	10–12–5	L
28	December 7, 1992	3–4	@ Quebec Nordiques (1992–93)	10–13–5	L
29	December 9, 1992	5–2	Boston Bruins (1992–93)	11–13–5	W
30	December 11, 1992	9–3	Hartford Whalers (1992–93)	12–13–5	W
31	December 12, 1992	1–1 OT	@ Hartford Whalers (1992–93)	12–13–6	T
32	December 15, 1992	3–2	@ Boston Bruins (1992–93)	13–13–6	W
33	December 19, 1992	2–4	@ Montreal Canadiens (1992–93)	13–14–6	L
34	December 20, 1992	5–4	Toronto Maple Leafs (1992–93)	14–14–6	W
35	December 23, 1992	4–1	Washington Capitals (1992–93)	15–14–6	W
36	December 27, 1992	2–4	Pittsburgh Penguins (1992–93)	15–15–6	L
37	December 31, 1992	11–6	New York Rangers (1992–93)	16–15–6	W

January: 10–5–0 (home: 6–1–0; road: 4–4–0)

Game	Date	Score	Opponent	Record	Recap
38	January 2, 1993	7–2	@ Ottawa Senators (1992–93)	17–15–6	W
39	January 3, 1993	6–5 OT	St. Louis Blues (1992–93)	18–15–6	W
40	January 6, 1993	3–1	@ Hartford Whalers (1992–93)	19–15–6	W
41	January 8, 1993	6–5	New York Islanders (1992–93)	20–15–6	W
42	January 10, 1993	5–3	Calgary Flames (1992–93)	21–15–6	W
43	January 12, 1993	2–5	@ Boston Bruins (1992–93)	21–16–6	L
44	January 15, 1993	1–4	@ Vancouver Canucks (1992–93)	21–17–6	L
45	January 17, 1993	2–3 OT	@ Edmonton Oilers (1992–93)	21–18–6	L
46	January 19, 1993	3–2 OT	@ Calgary Flames (1992–93)	22–18–6	W
47	January 22, 1993	6–2	Quebec Nordiques (1992–93)	23–18–6	W
48	January 23, 1993	3–4	@ Quebec Nordiques (1992–93)	23–19–6	L
49	January 26, 1993	4–3 OT	@ Philadelphia Flyers (1992–93)	24–19–6	W
50	January 27, 1993	4–3	Washington Capitals (1992–93)	25–19–6	W
51	January 29, 1993	6–4	New York Rangers (1992–93)	26–19–6	W
52	January 31, 1993	4–5 OT	Edmonton Oilers (1992–93)	26–20–6	L

February: 5–4–1 (home: 3–2–0; road: 2–2–1)

Game	Date	Score	Opponent	Record	Recap
53	February 3, 1993	3–2	Hartford Whalers (1992–93)	27–20–6	W
54	February 8, 1993	2–4	@ Ottawa Senators (1992–93)	27–21–6	L
55	February 10, 1993	6–2	@ Winnipeg Jets (1992–93)	28–21–6	W
56	February 12, 1993	1–3	Vancouver Canucks (1992–93)	28–22–6	L
57	February 14, 1993	7–4	Pittsburgh Penguins (1992–93)	29–22–6	W
58	February 17, 1993	5–3	@ Hartford Whalers (1992–93)	30–22–6	W
59	February 19, 1993	3–3 OT	@ New Jersey Devils (1992–93)	30–22–7	T
60	February 24, 1993	10–7	Detroit Red Wings (1992–93)	31–22–7	W
61	February 26, 1993	4–6	Montreal Canadiens (1992–93)	31–23–7	L
62	February 27, 1993	4–8	@ Montreal Canadiens (1992–93)	31–24–7	L

March: 7–5–3 (home: 3–4–0; road: 4–1–3)

Game	Date	Score	Opponent	Record	Recap
63	March 1, 1993	2–5	Vancouver Canucks (1992–93)	31–25–7	L
64	March 3, 1993	2–2 OT	@ New York Rangers (1992–93)	31–25–8	T
65	March 5, 1993	2–4	Hartford Whalers (1992–93)	31–26–8	L
66	March 7, 1993	2–1	Winnipeg Jets (1992–93)	32–26–8	W
67	March 10, 1993	7–4	@ Quebec Nordiques (1992–93)	33–26–8	W
68	March 13, 1993	3–3 OT	@ Hartford Whalers (1992–93)	33–26–9	T
69	March 15, 1993	2–4	Los Angeles Kings (1992–93)	33–27–9	L
70	March 16, 1993	2–2 OT	@ St. Louis Blues (1992–93)	33–27–10	T
71	March 20, 1993	3–1	@ Tampa Bay Lightning (1992–93)	34–27–10	W
72	March 22, 1993	8–3	@ Montreal Canadiens (1992–93)	35–27–10	W
73	March 24, 1993	0–2	Boston Bruins (1992–93)	35–28–10	L
74	March 25, 1993	6–4	@ Chicago Blackhawks (1992–93)	36–28–10	W
75	March 28, 1993	3–1	Ottawa Senators (1992–93)	37–28–10	W
76	March 30, 1993	1–4	@ Washington Capitals (1992–93)	37–29–10	L
77	March 31, 1993	5–2	New Jersey Devils (1992–93)	38–29–10	W

April: 0–7–0 (home: 0–4–0; road: 0–3–0)

Game	Date	Score	Opponent	Record	Recap
78	April 3, 1993	2–3	@ Boston Bruins (1992–93)	38–30–10	L
79	April 4, 1993	0–3	Boston Bruins (1992–93)	38–31–10	L
80	April 6, 1993	1–3	@ Minnesota North Stars (1992–93)	38–32–10	L
81	April 10, 1993	5–6	@ Detroit Red Wings (1992–93)	38–33–10	L
82	April 11, 1993	1–3	Quebec Nordiques (1992–93)	38–34–10	L
83	April 13, 1993	2–3 OT	Montreal Canadiens (1992–93)	38–35–10	L
84	April 15, 1993	4–7	Philadelphia Flyers (1992–93)	38–36–10	L

Legend: W Win (2 points) L Loss (0 points) T Tie (1 point)

=== Playoffs ===
1993 Stanley Cup playoffs
Adams Division Semifinals vs. (A1) Boston Bruins – Sabres win 4–0

Game	Date	Score	Opponent	Series	Recap
1	April 18, 1993	5–4 OT	@ Boston Bruins	Sabres lead 1–0	W
2	April 20, 1993	4–0	@ Boston Bruins	Sabres lead 2–0	W
3	April 22, 1993	4–3 OT	Boston Bruins	Sabres lead 3–0	W
4	April 24, 1993	6–5 OT	Boston Bruins	Sabres win 4–0	W

Adams Division Finals vs. (A3) Montreal Canadiens – Canadiens win 4–0

Game	Date	Score	Opponent	Series	Recap
1	May 2, 1993	3–4	@ Montreal Canadiens	Canadiens lead 1–0	L
2	May 4, 1993	3–4 OT	@ Montreal Canadiens	Canadiens lead 2–0	L
3	May 6, 1993	3–4 OT	Montreal Canadiens	Canadiens lead 3–0	L
4	May 8, 1993	3–4 OT	Montreal Canadiens	Canadiens win 4–0	L

Legend: W Win L Loss

== Player statistics ==
=== Forwards ===
Note: GP = Games played; G = Goals; A = Assists; Pts = Points; PIM = Penalty minutes

Player	GP	G	A	Pts	PIM
Pat LaFontaine	84	53	95	148	63
Alexander Mogilny	77	76	51	127	40
Dale Hawerchuk	81	16	80	96	52
Dave Andreychuk*	52	29	32	61	48
Bob Sweeney	80	21	26	47	118
Randy Wood	82	18	25	43	77
Yuri Khmylev	68	20	19	39	28
Wayne Presley	79	15	17	32	96
Brad May	82	13	13	26	242
Dave Hannan	55	5	15	20	43
Donald Audette	44	12	7	19	51
Bob Corkum	68	6	4	10	38
Viktor Gordiouk	16	3	6	9	0
Colin Patterson	36	4	2	6	22
Rob Ray	68	3	2	5	211
Bob Errey*	8	1	3	4	4
Scott Thomas	7	1	1	2	15
Matthew Barnaby	2	1	0	1	10
Doug MacDonald	5	1	0	1	2
Peter Ciavaglia	3	0	0	0	0

* - player was traded during season; stats only include games played with Buffalo

=== Defencemen ===
Note: GP = Games played; G = Goals; A = Assists; Pts = Points; PIM = Penalty minutes

Player	GP	G	A	Pts	PIM
Doug Bodger	81	9	45	54	87
Richard Smehlik	80	4	27	31	59
Petr Svoboda	40	2	24	26	59
Ken Sutton	63	8	14	22	30
Grant Ledyard	50	2	14	16	45
Gord Donnelly	60	3	8	11	221
Mike Ramsey*	33	2	8	10	20
Randy Moller	35	2	7	9	83
Bob Boughner	15	3	5	8	6
Keith Carney	30	2	4	6	55
Philippe Boucher	18	0	4	4	14
Greg Brown	10	0	1	1	6

* - player was traded during season; stats only include games played with Buffalo

=== Goaltending ===
Note: GP = Games played; W = Wins; L = Losses; T = Ties; SO = Shutouts; GAA = Goals against average

Player	GP	W	L	T	SO	GAA
Dominik Hasek	28	11	10	4	0	3.15
Grant Fuhr	29	11	15	2	0	3.47
Daren Puppa*	24	11	5	4	0	3.58
Tom Draper	11	5	6	0	0	3.70

* - player was traded during season; stats only include games played with Buffalo

== Awards and records ==
- Pat LaFontaine, NHL Second Team All-Star
- Alexander Mogilny, NHL Second Team All-Star
- Alexander Mogilny, club record, goals in a season (76)
- Pat LaFontaine, club record, assists in a season (95)
- Pat LaFontaine, club record, points in a season (148)

== Transactions ==
- Grant Fuhr was traded to Buffalo by Toronto with Toronto's 5th round choice (Kevin Popp) in 1995 Entry Draft for Dave Andreychuk, Daren Puppa and Buffalo's 1st round choice (Kenny Jonsson) in 1993 Entry Draft, February 2, 1993.

== Draft picks ==
Buffalo's draft picks at the 1992 NHL entry draft held at the Montreal Forum in Montreal, Quebec.

Round	#	Player	Nationality	College/Junior/Club team
1	11	David Cooper	Canada	Medicine Hat Tigers (WHL)
2	35	Jozef Cierny	Czechoslovakia	ZTK Zvolen (Czechoslovakia)
3	59	Ondrej Steiner	Czechoslovakia	Skoda Plzen (Czechoslovakia)
4	80	Dean Melanson	Canada	Saint-Hyacinthe Laser (QMJHL)
4	83	Matthew Barnaby	Canada	Beauport Harfangs (QMJHL)
5	107	Markus Ketterer	Finland	Jokerit (Finland)
5	108	Yuri Khmylev	Russia	Krylya Sovetov (Russia)
6	131	Paul Rushforth	Canada	North Bay Centennials (OHL)
8	179	Dean Tiltgen	Canada	Tri-City Americans (WHL)
9	203	Todd Simon	Canada	Niagara Falls Thunder (OHL)
10	227	Rick Kowalsky	Canada	Sault Ste. Marie Greyhounds (OHL)
11	251	Chris Clancy	Canada	Cornwall Royals (OHL)
