= 1992–93 New York Islanders season =

NHL hockey team season

1992–93 New York Islanders
- Division: 3rd Patrick
- Conference: 6th Wales
- 1992–93 record: 40–37–7
- Home record: 20–19–3
- Road record: 20–18–4
- Goals for: 335
- Goals against: 297

Team information
- General manager: Don Maloney
- Coach: Al Arbour
- Captain: Patrick Flatley
- Alternate captains: Ray Ferraro; Steve Thomas
- Arena: Nassau Coliseum
- Average attendance: 12,036

Team leaders
- Goals: Pierre Turgeon (58)
- Assists: Pierre Turgeon (74)
- Points: Pierre Turgeon (132)
- Penalty minutes: Mick Vukota (216)
- Plus/minus: Brad Dalgarno (+17)
- Wins: Glenn Healy (22)
- Goals against average: Glenn Healy (3.30)

The 1992–93 New York Islanders season was the 21st season in franchise history. This involved the Islanders participating in the Wales Conference Finals. This would be the Islanders last playoff series win until 2016.

== Offseason ==
On August 17, general manager Bill Torrey was fired and replaced by assistant general manager Don Maloney.

== Regular season ==
Four Islanders (Benoit Hogue, Derek King, Steve Thomas and Pierre Turgeon) reached the 30-goal plateau. The team was the least penalized team during the regular season, being shorthanded only 375 times. The Islanders also tied the Boston Bruins and Washington Capitals for the fewest short-handed goals allowed during the regular season, with just 8.

=== Season standings ===
Patrick Division
	GP	W	L	T	Pts	GF	GA
**Pittsburgh Penguins**	84	56	21	7	**119**	367	268
**Washington Capitals**	84	43	34	7	**93**	325	286
**New York Islanders**	84	40	37	7	**87**	335	297
**New Jersey Devils**	84	40	37	7	**87**	308	299
Philadelphia Flyers	84	36	37	11	83	319	319
New York Rangers	84	34	39	11	79	304	308

Note: GP = Games played, W = Wins, L = Losses, T = Ties, Pts = Points, GF = Goals for, GA = Goals against
Note: Teams that qualified for the playoffs are highlighted in bold.

Wales Conference
R		Div	GP	W	L	T	GF	GA	Pts
**1**	**p – Pittsburgh Penguins**	**PTK**	**84**	**56**	**21**	**7**	**367**	**268**	**119**
**2**	**Boston Bruins**	**ADM**	**84**	**51**	**26**	**7**	**332**	**268**	**109**
**3**	**Quebec Nordiques**	**ADM**	**84**	**47**	**27**	**10**	**351**	**300**	**104**
**4**	**Montreal Canadiens**	**ADM**	**84**	**48**	**30**	**6**	**326**	**280**	**102**
**5**	**Washington Capitals**	**PTK**	**84**	**43**	**34**	**7**	**325**	**286**	**93**
**6**	**New York Islanders**	**PTK**	**84**	**40**	**37**	**7**	**335**	**297**	**87**
**7**	**New Jersey Devils**	**PTK**	**84**	**40**	**37**	**7**	**308**	**299**	**87**
**8**	**Buffalo Sabres**	**ADM**	**84**	**38**	**36**	**10**	**335**	**297**	**86**
9	Philadelphia Flyers	PTK	84	36	37	11	319	319	83
10	New York Rangers	PTK	84	34	39	11	304	308	79
11	Hartford Whalers	ADM	84	26	52	6	284	369	58
12	Ottawa Senators	ADM	84	10	70	4	202	395	24

p – Won Presidents' Trophy (and division)
Divisions: PTK – Patrick, ADM – Adams
bold – Qualified for playoffs

== Playoffs ==
=== Patrick Division Semifinals ===
Game 6 of this series was marred by a vicious check on the Islanders' leading scorer, Pierre Turgeon, by the Capitals' Dale Hunter, moments after Turgeon scored a third-period goal to put the game and the series out of reach for Washington. Hunter received a 21-game suspension for the hit, which carried over into the 1993–94 season.

=== Patrick Division Finals ===
The Isles' defeated the Pittsburgh Penguins with David Volek's series-winning goal at 5:16 of overtime in Game 7, in a reversal from 1982, when the 8th-seeded Penguins nearly eliminated the two-time defending champion Islanders in the first round.

=== Wales Conference Finals ===
The Montreal Canadiens' win in game three was their eleventh straight, tying the single-playoff record set a year earlier by Pittsburgh and the Chicago Blackhawks.

== Schedule and results ==
=== Regular season ===
1992–93 regular season
October: 6–5–1 (home: 3–2–0; road: 3–3–1)

Game	Date	Score	Opponent	Record	Recap
1	October 6, 1992	3–4	@ New Jersey Devils (1992–93)	0–1–0	L
2	October 8, 1992	3–7	@ Pittsburgh Penguins (1992–93)	0–2–0	L
3	October 10, 1992	3–3 OT	@ Boston Bruins (1992–93)	0–2–1	T
4	October 15, 1992	5–4	@ Philadelphia Flyers (1992–93)	1–2–1	W
5	October 17, 1992	6–3	New York Rangers (1992–93)	2–2–1	W
6	October 18, 1992	3–4	@ New York Rangers (1992–93)	2–3–1	L
7	October 20, 1992	4–3	Philadelphia Flyers (1992–93)	3–3–1	W
8	October 23, 1992	5–2	@ Washington Capitals (1992–93)	4–3–1	W
9	October 24, 1992	4–2	Hartford Whalers (1992–93)	5–3–1	W
10	October 27, 1992	3–4	Los Angeles Kings (1992–93)	5–4–1	L
11	October 30, 1992	4–1	@ New Jersey Devils (1992–93)	6–4–1	W
12	October 31, 1992	3–5	New Jersey Devils (1992–93)	6–5–1	L

November: 3–6–2 (home: 2–1–0; road: 1–5–2)

Game	Date	Score	Opponent	Record	Recap
13	November 3, 1992	0–2	@ Pittsburgh Penguins (1992–93)	6–6–1	L
14	November 5, 1992	0–3	@ Minnesota North Stars (1992–93)	6–7–1	L
15	November 7, 1992	5–6 OT	Tampa Bay Lightning (1992–93)	6–8–1	L
16	November 12, 1992	5–8	@ Philadelphia Flyers (1992–93)	6–9–1	L
17	November 14, 1992	7–5	Buffalo Sabres (1992–93)	7–9–1	W
18	November 19, 1992	2–5	@ Boston Bruins (1992–93)	7–10–1	L
19	November 21, 1992	4–3	@ Calgary Flames (1992–93)	8–10–1	W
20	November 22, 1992	5–5 OT	@ Edmonton Oilers (1992–93)	8–10–2	T
21	November 24, 1992	3–3 OT	@ Winnipeg Jets (1992–93)	8–10–3	T
22	November 27, 1992	3–6	@ Philadelphia Flyers (1992–93)	8–11–3	L
23	November 28, 1992	9–3	Philadelphia Flyers (1992–93)	9–11–3	W

December: 7–7–1 (home: 3–4–0; road: 4–3–1)

Game	Date	Score	Opponent	Record	Recap
24	December 1, 1992	3–7	Pittsburgh Penguins (1992–93)	9–12–3	L
25	December 4, 1992	5–5 OT	@ Buffalo Sabres (1992–93)	9–12–4	T
26	December 5, 1992	3–5	Washington Capitals (1992–93)	9–13–4	L
27	December 7, 1992	6–1	@ Tampa Bay Lightning (1992–93)	10–13–4	W
28	December 10, 1992	3–5	@ Chicago Blackhawks (1992–93)	10–14–4	L
29	December 12, 1992	3–4 OT	Winnipeg Jets (1992–93)	10–15–4	L
30	December 13, 1992	4–1	Edmonton Oilers (1992–93)	11–15–4	W
31	December 15, 1992	4–3 OT	@ St. Louis Blues (1992–93)	12–15–4	W
32	December 17, 1992	9–3	Ottawa Senators (1992–93)	13–15–4	W
33	December 19, 1992	4–3	@ Pittsburgh Penguins (1992–93)	14–15–4	W
34	December 20, 1992	3–5	@ Quebec Nordiques (1992–93)	14–16–4	L
35	December 23, 1992	6–2	@ Montreal Canadiens (1992–93)	15–16–4	W
36	December 26, 1992	6–4	New York Rangers (1992–93)	16–16–4	W
37	December 29, 1992	2–3	Toronto Maple Leafs (1992–93)	16–17–4	L
38	December 31, 1992	1–5	@ St. Louis Blues (1992–93)	16–18–4	L

January: 7–5–1 (home: 4–4–1; road: 3–1–0)

Game	Date	Score	Opponent	Record	Recap
39	January 2, 1993	3–2	Minnesota North Stars (1992–93)	17–18–4	W
40	January 5, 1993	1–2	Quebec Nordiques (1992–93)	17–19–4	L
41	January 8, 1993	5–6	@ Buffalo Sabres (1992–93)	17–20–4	L
42	January 9, 1993	4–5	Vancouver Canucks (1992–93)	17–21–4	L
43	January 12, 1993	8–2	Calgary Flames (1992–93)	18–21–4	W
44	January 14, 1993	0–3	Washington Capitals (1992–93)	18–22–4	L
45	January 16, 1993	5–3	@ New Jersey Devils (1992–93)	19–22–4	W
46	January 17, 1993	7–2	@ Ottawa Senators (1992–93)	20–22–4	W
47	January 19, 1993	2–2 OT	Boston Bruins (1992–93)	20–22–5	T
48	January 23, 1993	8–4	Philadelphia Flyers (1992–93)	21–22–5	W
49	January 26, 1993	8–2	New Jersey Devils (1992–93)	22–22–5	W
50	January 28, 1993	5–2	@ Pittsburgh Penguins (1992–93)	23–22–5	W
51	January 30, 1993	5–6	Boston Bruins (1992–93)	23–23–5	L

February: 6–5–1 (home: 3–3–1; road: 3–2–0)

Game	Date	Score	Opponent	Record	Recap
52	February 1, 1993	4–4 OT	New York Rangers (1992–93)	23–23–6	T
53	February 3, 1993	3–2	@ Toronto Maple Leafs (1992–93)	24–23–6	W
54	February 9, 1993	3–5	Montreal Canadiens (1992–93)	24–24–6	L
55	February 12, 1993	3–4	@ New York Rangers (1992–93)	24–25–6	L
56	February 13, 1993	5–2	New York Rangers (1992–93)	25–25–6	W
57	February 16, 1993	7–2	Edmonton Oilers (1992–93)	26–25–6	W
58	February 18, 1993	2–4	St. Louis Blues (1992–93)	26–26–6	L
59	February 20, 1993	4–2	Pittsburgh Penguins (1992–93)	27–26–6	W
60	February 23, 1993	2–4	Washington Capitals (1992–93)	27–27–6	L
61	February 25, 1993	4–6	@ Quebec Nordiques (1992–93)	27–28–6	L
62	February 27, 1993	3–2	@ Philadelphia Flyers (1992–93)	28–28–6	W
63	February 28, 1993	7–6 OT	@ Hartford Whalers (1992–93)	29–28–6	W

March: 7–5–0 (home: 4–2–0; road: 3–3–0)

Game	Date	Score	Opponent	Record	Recap
64	March 2, 1993	3–2	Detroit Red Wings (1992–93)	30–28–6	W
65	March 7, 1993	3–2	@ Washington Capitals (1992–93)	31–28–6	W
66	March 9, 1993	4–2	Philadelphia Flyers (1992–93)	32–28–6	W
67	March 10, 1993	1–5	@ Montreal Canadiens (1992–93)	32–29–6	L
68	March 14, 1993	2–3	Pittsburgh Penguins (1992–93)	32–30–6	L
69	March 16, 1993	6–0	@ San Jose Sharks (1992–93)	33–30–6	W
70	March 18, 1993	4–7	@ Los Angeles Kings (1992–93)	33–31–6	L
71	March 20, 1993	7–2	@ Vancouver Canucks (1992–93)	34–31–6	W
72	March 23, 1993	2–3	@ Detroit Red Wings (1992–93)	34–32–6	L
73	March 25, 1993	2–5	Washington Capitals (1992–93)	34–33–6	L
74	March 27, 1993	7–3	San Jose Sharks (1992–93)	35–33–6	W
75	March 30, 1993	2–1	Philadelphia Flyers (1992–93)	36–33–6	W

April: 4–4–1 (home: 1–3–1; road: 3–1–0)

Game	Date	Score	Opponent	Record	Recap
76	April 2, 1993	3–2 OT	@ New York Rangers (1992–93)	37–33–6	W
77	April 3, 1993	2–3	Montreal Canadiens (1992–93)	37–34–6	L
78	April 6, 1993	3–2	@ Washington Capitals (1992–93)	38–34–6	W
79	April 8, 1993	2–3	Chicago Blackhawks (1992–93)	38–35–6	L
80	April 10, 1993	3–5	Ottawa Senators (1992–93)	38–36–6	L
81	April 11, 1993	5–4	@ New Jersey Devils (1992–93)	39–36–6	W
82	April 13, 1993	3–3 OT	Hartford Whalers (1992–93)	39–36–7	T
83	April 14, 1993	4–5 OT	@ Hartford Whalers (1992–93)	39–37–7	L
84	April 16, 1993	8–4	New Jersey Devils (1992–93)	40–37–7	W

Legend: W Win (2 points) L Loss (0 points) T Tie (1 point)

=== Playoffs ===
1993 Stanley Cup playoffs
Patrick Division Semifinals vs. (P2) Washington Capitals – Islanders win 4–2

Game	Date	Score	Opponent	Series	Recap
1	April 18, 1993	1–3	@ Washington Capitals	Capitals lead 1–0	L
2	April 20, 1993	5–4 2OT	@ Washington Capitals	Series tied 1–1	W
3	April 22, 1993	4–3 OT	Washington Capitals	Islanders lead 2–1	W
4	April 24, 1993	4–3 2OT	Washington Capitals	Islanders lead 3–1	W
5	April 26, 1993	4–6	@ Washington Capitals	Islanders lead 3–2	L
6	April 28, 1993	5–3	Washington Capitals	Islanders win 4–2	W

Patrick Division Finals vs. (P1) Pittsburgh Penguins – Islanders win 4–3

Game	Date	Score	Opponent	Series	Recap
1	May 2, 1993	3–2	@ Pittsburgh Penguins	Islanders lead 1–0	W
2	May 4, 1993	0–3	@ Pittsburgh Penguins	Series tied 1–1	L
3	May 6, 1993	1–3	Pittsburgh Penguins	Penguins lead 2–1	L
4	May 8, 1993	6–5	Pittsburgh Penguins	Series tied 2–2	W
5	May 10, 1993	3–6	@ Pittsburgh Penguins	Penguins lead 3–2	L
6	May 12, 1993	7–5	Pittsburgh Penguins	Series tied 3–3	W
7	May 14, 1993	4–3 OT	@ Pittsburgh Penguins	Islanders win 4–3	W

Wales Conference Finals vs. (A3) Montreal Canadiens – Canadiens win 4–1

Game	Date	Score	Opponent	Series	Recap
1	May 16, 1993	1–4	@ Montreal Canadiens	Canadiens lead 1–0	L
2	May 18, 1993	3–4 2OT	@ Montreal Canadiens	Canadiens lead 2–0	L
3	May 20, 1993	1–2 OT	Montreal Canadiens	Canadiens lead 3–0	L
4	May 22, 1993	4–1	Montreal Canadiens	Canadiens lead 3–1	W
5	May 24, 1993	2–5	@ Montreal Canadiens	Canadiens win 4–1	L

Legend: W Win L Loss

== Player statistics ==
Regular season
Scoring

Player	Pos	GP	G	A	Pts	PIM	+/-	PPG	SHG	GWG
Pierre Turgeon	C	83	58	74	132	26	-1	24	0	10
Steve Thomas	LW	79	37	50	87	111	3	12	0	7
Derek King	LW	77	38	38	76	47	-4	21	0	7
Benoit Hogue	C	70	33	42	75	108	13	5	3	5
Patrick Flatley	RW	80	13	47	60	63	5	1	2	1
Vladimir Malakhov	D	64	14	38	52	59	14	7	0	0
Jeff Norton	D	66	12	38	50	45	-3	5	0	0
Uwe Krupp	D	80	9	29	38	67	6	2	0	2
Tom Kurvers	D	52	8	30	38	38	9	3	0	0
Brian Mullen	RW	81	18	14	32	28	5	1	0	1
Brad Dalgarno	RW	57	15	17	32	62	17	2	0	2
Marty McInnis	RW	56	10	20	30	24	7	0	1	0
Ray Ferraro	C	46	14	13	27	40	0	3	0	1
Tom Fitzgerald	RW	77	9	18	27	34	-2	0	3	1
Travis Green	C	61	7	18	25	43	4	1	0	0
Scott Lachance	D	75	7	17	24	67	-1	0	1	2
David Volek	W	56	8	13	21	34	-1	2	0	1
Darius Kasparaitis	D	79	4	17	21	166	15	0	0	0
Bill Berg	LW	22	6	3	9	49	4	0	2	0
Claude Loiselle	C	41	5	3	8	90	-5	0	0	0
Daniel Marois	RW	28	2	5	7	35	-3	0	0	0
Mick Vukota	RW	74	2	5	7	216	3	0	0	0
Dennis Vaske	D	27	1	5	6	32	9	0	0	0
Iain Fraser	C	7	2	2	4	2	-1	1	0	0
Rich Pilon	D	44	1	3	4	164	-4	0	0	0
Richard Kromm	LW	1	1	2	3	0	3	0	0	0
Gary Nylund	D	22	1	1	2	43	-2	0	0	0
Glenn Healy	G	47	0	2	2	2	0	0	0	0
Mark Fitzpatrick	G	39	0	1	1	2	0	0	0	0
Danny Lorenz	G	4	0	0	0	0	0	0	0	0
Greg Parks	C	2	0	0	0	0	0	0	0	0
Graeme Townshend	RW	2	0	0	0	0	0	0	0	0

Goaltending

Player	MIN	GP	W	L	T	GA	GAA	SO	SA	SV	SV%
Glenn Healy	2655	47	22	20	2	146	3.30	1	1316	1170	.889
Mark Fitzpatrick	2253	39	17	15	5	130	3.46	0	1066	936	.878
Danny Lorenz	157	4	1	2	0	10	3.82	0	78	68	.872
Team:	5065	84	40	37	7	286	3.39	1	2460	2174	.884

Playoffs
Scoring

Player	Pos	GP	G	A	Pts	PIM	+/-	PPG	SHG	GWG
Ray Ferraro	C	18	13	7	20	18	5	0	0	0
Steve Thomas	LW	18	9	8	17	37	-1	0	0	0
Derek King	LW	18	3	11	14	14	3	0	0	0
Pierre Turgeon	C	11	6	7	13	0	2	0	0	0
Benoit Hogue	C	18	6	6	12	31	7	0	0	0
Vladimir Malakhov	D	17	3	6	9	12	-3	0	0	0
Patrick Flatley	RW	15	2	7	9	12	1	0	0	0
Brian Mullen	RW	18	3	4	7	2	-4	0	0	0
Tom Fitzgerald	RW	18	2	5	7	18	2	0	0	0
Uwe Krupp	D	18	1	5	6	12	2	0	0	0
Dennis Vaske	D	18	0	6	6	14	-3	0	0	0
David Volek	W	10	4	1	5	2	1	0	0	1
Darius Kasparaitis	D	18	0	5	5	31	2	0	0	0
Travis Green	C	12	3	1	4	6	-3	0	0	0
Brad Dalgarno	RW	18	2	2	4	14	-1	0	0	0
Glenn Healy	G	18	0	3	3	0	0	0	0	0
Claude Loiselle	C	18	0	3	3	10	-8	0	0	0
Jeff Norton	D	10	1	1	2	4	-5	0	0	0
Tom Kurvers	D	12	0	2	2	6	0	0	0	0
Steve Junker	LW	3	0	1	1	0	1	0	0	0
Marty McInnis	RW	3	0	1	1	0	-1	0	0	0
Mark Fitzpatrick	G	3	0	0	0	2	0	0	0	0
Greg Parks	C	2	0	0	0	0	0	0	0	0
Rich Pilon	D	15	0	0	0	50	5	0	0	0
Scott Scissons	C	1	0	0	0	0	-1	0	0	0
Mick Vukota	RW	15	0	0	0	16	-4	0	0	0

Goaltending

Player	MIN	GP	W	L	GA	GAA	SO	SA	SV	SV%
Glenn Healy	1109	18	9	8	59	3.19	0	524	465	.887
Mark Fitzpatrick	77	3	0	1	4	3.12	0	23	19	.826
Team:	1186	18	9	9	63	3.19	0	547	484	.885

Note: Pos = Position; GP = Games played; G = Goals; A = Assists; Pts = Points; +/- = plus/minus; PIM = Penalty minutes; PPG = Power-play goals; SHG = Short-handed goals; GWG = Game-winning goals
MIN = Minutes played; W = Wins; L = Losses; T = Ties; GA = Goals-against; GAA = Goals-against average; SO = Shutouts; SA = Shots against; SV = Shots saved; SV% = Save percentage;

== Awards and records ==
- Lady Byng Memorial Trophy: Pierre Turgeon
- Vladimir Malakhov, Defense, NHL All-Rookie Team

== Draft picks ==
The Islanders' picks at the 1992 NHL entry draft.

Round	#	Player	Pos	Nationality	College/Junior/Club team (League)
1	5	Darius Kasparaitis	D	Lithuania	Dynamo Moscow (CIS)
3	56	Jarrett Deuling	LW	Canada	Kamloops Blazers (WHL)
5	104	Tomas Klimt	C	Czechoslovakia	Škoda Plzeň (Czechoslovakia)
5	105	Ryan Duthie	C	Canada	Spokane Chiefs (WHL)
6	128	Derek Armstrong	C	Canada	Sudbury Wolves (OHL)
7	152	Vladimir Grachev	RW	Russia	Dynamo-2 Moscow (CIS-2)
7	159	Steve O'Rourke	RW	Canada	Tri-City Americans (WHL)
8	176	Jason Widmer	D	Canada	Lethbridge Hurricanes (WHL)
9	200	Daniel Paradis	C	Canada	Chicoutimi Saguenéens (QMJHL)
10	224	David Wainwright	D	United States	Thayer Academy (USHS-MA)
11	248	Andrei Vasilyev	LW	Russia	CSKA Moscow (CIS)
S	8	Chris Roy	D	Canada	Northeastern University (Hockey East)
