= 1992–93 Boston Bruins season =

NHL team season

1992–93 Boston Bruins
- Adams Division champions
- Division: 1st Adams
- Conference: 2nd Wales
- 1992–93 record: 51–26–7
- Home record: 29–10–3
- Road record: 22–16–4
- Goals for: 332
- Goals against: 268

Team information
- General manager: Harry Sinden
- Coach: Brian Sutter
- Captain: Ray Bourque
- Alternate captains: Cam Neely; Adam Oates
- Arena: Boston Garden
- Average attendance: 14,233
- Minor league affiliates: Providence Bruins (AHL); Johnstown Chiefs (ECHL)

Team leaders
- Goals: Adam Oates (45)
- Assists: Adam Oates (97)
- Points: Adam Oates (142)
- Penalty minutes: Brent Hughes (191)
- Plus/minus: Ray Bourque (+38)
- Wins: Andy Moog (37)
- Goals against average: John Blue (2.90)

The 1992–93 Boston Bruins season was the team's 69th season.

== Offseason ==
On June 8, head coach Rick Bowness was fired. A day later, Brian Sutter was named the team's new head coach.

== Regular season ==
The team finished second in the regular season behind the Pittsburgh Penguins. The Bruins played well all season long and finished their final 8 regular-season games with a perfect 8–0–0 record. The team had the most shots on goal (2,893) during the regular season of all 24 teams. They also tied the New York Islanders and Washington Capitals for the fewest short-handed goals allowed (8) over 84 games.

=== Final standings ===
Adams Division
	GP	W	L	T	Pts	GF	GA
**Boston Bruins**	84	51	26	7	**109**	332	268
**Quebec Nordiques**	84	47	27	10	**104**	351	300
**Montreal Canadiens**	84	48	30	6	**102**	326	280
**Buffalo Sabres**	84	38	36	10	**86**	335	297
Hartford Whalers	84	26	52	6	58	284	369
Ottawa Senators	84	10	70	4	24	202	395

Note: GP = Games played, W = Wins, L = Losses, T = Ties, Pts = Points, GF = Goals for, GA = Goals against
Note: Teams that qualified for the playoffs are highlighted in bold.

Wales Conference
R		Div	GP	W	L	T	GF	GA	Pts
**1**	**p – Pittsburgh Penguins**	**PTK**	**84**	**56**	**21**	**7**	**367**	**268**	**119**
**2**	**Boston Bruins**	**ADM**	**84**	**51**	**26**	**7**	**332**	**268**	**109**
**3**	**Quebec Nordiques**	**ADM**	**84**	**47**	**27**	**10**	**351**	**300**	**104**
**4**	**Montreal Canadiens**	**ADM**	**84**	**48**	**30**	**6**	**326**	**280**	**102**
**5**	**Washington Capitals**	**PTK**	**84**	**43**	**34**	**7**	**325**	**286**	**93**
**6**	**New York Islanders**	**PTK**	**84**	**40**	**37**	**7**	**335**	**297**	**87**
**7**	**New Jersey Devils**	**PTK**	**84**	**40**	**37**	**7**	**308**	**299**	**87**
**8**	**Buffalo Sabres**	**ADM**	**84**	**38**	**36**	**10**	**335**	**297**	**86**
9	Philadelphia Flyers	PTK	84	36	37	11	319	319	83
10	New York Rangers	PTK	84	34	39	11	304	308	79
11	Hartford Whalers	ADM	84	26	52	6	284	369	58
12	Ottawa Senators	ADM	84	10	70	4	202	395	24

p – Won Presidents' Trophy (and division)
Divisions: PTK – Patrick, ADM – Adams
bold – Qualified for playoffs

== Playoffs ==
Despite being favored to win their first-round matchup against the Buffalo Sabres, the Bruins were eliminated in the Adams Division semifinals by Buffalo in four straight games. Three games were decided in overtime, including the fourth game, which the winning goal was scored by Brad May.

== Schedule and results ==
=== Regular season ===
1992–93 regular season
October: 7–2–1 (home: 3–1–1; road: 4–1–0)

Game	Date	Visitor	Score	Home	OT	Decision	Record	Points	Recap
1	October 8	Hartford	2–3	Boston	OT	Moog	1–0–0	2	W
2	October 10	NY Islanders	3–3	Boston	OT	Moog	1–0–1	3	T
3	October 12	Ottawa	3–6	Boston		Moog	2–0–1	5	W
4	October 15	Boston	8–2	San Jose		Moog	3–0–1	7	W
5	October 17	Boston	6–8	Los Angeles		Lemelin	3–1–1	7	L
6	October 22	Boston	4–2	Calgary		Lemelin	4–1–1	9	W
7	October 23	Boston	6–3	Edmonton		Moog	5–1–1	11	W
8	October 25	Boston	5–3	Vancouver		Lemelin	6–1–1	13	W
9	October 29	Los Angeles	3–8	Boston		Moog	7–1–1	15	W
10	October 31	Chicago	3–2	Boston		Moog	7–2–1	15	L

November: 7–5–1 (home: 5–1–1; road: 2–4–0)

Game	Date	Visitor	Score	Home	OT	Decision	Record	Points	Recap
11	November 5	Quebec	4–6	Boston		Moog	8–2–1	17	W
12	November 7	NY Rangers	2–2	Boston	OT	Moog	8–2–2	18	T
13	November 11	Boston	2–7	Buffalo		Moog	8–3–2	18	L
14	November 12	Calgary	3–5	Boston		Lemelin	9–3–2	20	W
15	November 14	Toronto	4–1	Boston		Moog	9–4–2	20	L
16	November 16	Boston	3–6	Montreal		Moog	9–5–2	20	L
17	November 19	NY Islanders	2–5	Boston		Moog	10–5–2	22	W
18	November 21	Philadelphia	3–4	Boston		Moog	11–5–2	24	W
19	November 23	Boston	3–2	Ottawa		Moog	12–5–2	26	W
20	November 25	Boston	2–6	Washington		Moog	12–6–2	26	L
21	November 27	Hartford	4–5	Boston	OT	Lemelin	13–6–2	28	W
22	November 28	Boston	3–4	Hartford	OT	Lemelin	13–7–2	28	L
23	November 30	Boston	4–3	Quebec		Moog	14–7–2	30	W

December: 7–7–0 (home: 4–1–0; road: 3–6–0)

Game	Date	Visitor	Score	Home	OT	Decision	Record	Points	Recap
24	December 3	Montreal	3–4	Boston		Moog	15–7–2	32	W
25	December 5	Boston	4–2	New Jersey		Moog	16–7–2	34	W
26	December 6	Boston	7–1	Philadelphia		Moog	17–7–2	36	W
27	December 9	Boston	2–5	Buffalo		Moog	17–8–2	36	L
28	December 10	Ottawa	2–4	Boston		Lemelin	18–8–2	38	W
29	December 12	Boston	1–5	Montreal		Moog	18–9–2	38	L
30	December 15	Buffalo	3–2	Boston		Moog	18–10–2	38	L
31	December 18	Boston	1–6	Detroit		Moog	18–11–2	38	L
32	December 19	Washington	3–4	Boston		Moog	19–11–2	40	W
33	December 22	Tampa Bay	3–5	Boston		Moog	20–11–2	42	W
34	December 26	Boston	9–4	Hartford		Moog	21–11–2	44	W
35	December 27	Boston	5–6	NY Rangers		Moog	21–12–2	44	L
36	December 29	Boston	4–5	Winnipeg		Lemelin	21–13–2	44	L
37	December 31	Boston	3–5	Minnesota		Moog	21–14–2	44	L

January: 8–5–2 (home: 6–3–0; road: 2–2–2)

Game	Date	Visitor	Score	Home	OT	Decision	Record	Points	Recap
38	January 2	Hartford	2–3	Boston	OT	Moog	22–14–2	46	W
39	January 5	Boston	2–6	Pittsburgh		Moog	22–15–2	46	L
40	January 7	Quebec	3–2	Boston	OT	Blue	22–16–2	46	L
41	January 9	New Jersey	6–2	Boston		Blue	22–17–2	46	L
42	January 12	Buffalo	2–5	Boston		Blue	23–17–2	48	W
43	January 14	Pittsburgh	0–7	Boston		Blue	24–17–2	50	W
44	January 16	Philadelphia	5–4	Boston		Moog	24–18–2	50	L
45	January 18	San Jose	3–4	Boston		Moog	25–18–2	52	W
46	January 19	Boston	2–2	NY Islanders	OT	Blue	25–18–3	53	T
47	January 21	Boston	5–4	Philadelphia		Moog	26–18–3	55	W
48	January 23	New Jersey	5–7	Boston		Moog	27–18–3	57	W
49	January 25	Boston	2–3	Montreal	OT	Blue	27–19–3	57	L
50	January 26	Boston	4–4	Quebec	OT	Moog	27–19–4	58	T
51	January 28	Winnipeg	2–6	Boston		Blue	28–19–4	60	W
52	January 30	Boston	6–5	NY Islanders		Blue	29–19–4	62	W

February: 4–3–3 (home: 1–1–1; road: 3–2–2)

Game	Date	Visitor	Score	Home	OT	Decision	Record	Points	Recap
53	February 2	Edmonton	4–3	Boston		Moog	29–20–4	62	L
54	February 3	Boston	4–1	Quebec		Blue	30–20–4	64	W
55	February 8	Boston	0–4	Pittsburgh (played @ Atlanta)		Blue	30–21–4	64	L
56	February 9	Boston	6–1	St. Louis		Blue	31–21–4	66	W
57	February 11	Boston	3–6	Chicago		Blue	31–22–4	66	L
58	February 14	Boston	3–3	Tampa Bay	OT	Blue	31–22–5	67	T
59	February 17	Boston	5–2	Montreal		Blue	32–22–5	69	W
60	February 20	Boston	4–4	Toronto	OT	Blue	32–22–6	70	T
61	February 25	Minnesota	3–3	Boston	OT	Blue	32–22–7	71	T
62	February 27	Washington	4–5	Boston	OT	Moog	33–22–7	73	W

March: 11–4–0 (home: 7–3–0; road: 4–1–0)

Game	Date	Visitor	Score	Home	OT	Decision	Record	Points	Recap
63	March 1	Montreal	5–2	Boston		Blue	33–23–7	73	L
64	March 4	Vancouver	3–4	Boston		Moog	34–23–7	75	W
65	March 6	St. Louis	3–4	Boston	OT	Moog	35–23–7	77	W
66	March 9	Boston	2–3	Pittsburgh		Blue	35–24–7	77	L
67	March 11	Montreal	2–5	Boston		Moog	36–24–7	79	W
68	March 13	Ottawa	3–6	Boston		Moog	37–24–7	81	W
69	March 15	Boston	3–1	NY Rangers		Moog	38–24–7	83	W
70	March 16	New Jersey	1–3	Boston (played @ Providence)		Blue	39–24–7	85	W
71	March 18	Boston	4–1	Ottawa		Moog	40–24–7	87	W
72	March 20	Detroit	7–4	Boston		Blue	40–25–7	87	L
73	March 22	Hartford	4–5	Boston		Moog	41–25–7	89	W
74	March 24	Boston	2–0	Buffalo		Moog	42–25–7	91	W
75	March 25	Montreal	0–2	Boston		Moog	43–25–7	93	W
76	March 27	Pittsburgh	5–3	Boston		Moog	43–26–7	93	L
77	March 30	Boston	3–1	Hartford		Moog	44–26–7	95	W

April: 7–0–0 (home: 3–0–0; road: 4–0–0)

Game	Date	Visitor	Score	Home	OT	Decision	Record	Points	Recap
78	April 3	Buffalo	2–3	Boston		Moog	45–26–7	97	W
79	April 4	Boston	3–0	Buffalo		Moog	46–26–7	99	W
80	April 6	Boston	7–1	Quebec		Moog	47–26–7	101	W
81	April 8	Quebec	2–6	Boston		Moog	48–26–7	103	W
82	April 10	Boston	5–1	Montreal		Moog	49–26–7	105	W
83	April 11	Ottawa	2–4	Boston		Blue	50–26–7	107	W
84	April 14	Boston	2–4	Ottawa		Moog	51–26–7	109	W

Legend: W Win (2 points) L Loss (0 points) T Tie (1 point)

=== Playoffs ===
1993 Stanley Cup playoffs
Adams Division Semifinals vs. (A4) Buffalo Sabres – Sabres win 4–0

Game	Date	Visitor	Score	Home	OT	Decision	Series	Recap
1	April 18	Buffalo	5–4	Boston	OT	Moog	0–1	L
2	April 20	Buffalo	4–0	Boston		Moog	0–2	L
3	April 22	Boston	3–4	Buffalo	OT	Blue	0–3	L
4	April 24	Boston	5–6	Buffalo	OT	Moog	0–4	L

Legend: W Win L Loss

== Player statistics ==
=== Skaters ===
Regular season
Player	GP	G	A	Pts	+/-	PIM
Adam Oates	84	45	97	142	15	32
Joe Juneau	84	32	70	102	23	33
Ray Bourque	78	19	63	82	38	40
Dmitri Kvartalnov	73	30	42	72	9	16
Stephen Leach	79	26	25	51	-6	126
Dave Poulin	84	16	33	49	29	62
Vladimír Ruzicka	60	19	22	41	-6	38
Dave Reid	65	20	16	36	12	10
Ted Donato	82	15	20	35	2	61
Don Sweeney	84	7	27	34	34	68
Glen Wesley	64	8	25	33	-2	47
Steve Heinze	73	18	13	31	20	24
David Shaw	77	10	14	24	10	108
Cam Neely	13	11	7	18	4	25
Gord Murphy	49	5	12	17	-13	62
Gordie Roberts	65	5	12	17	23	105
Grigori Panteleev	39	8	6	14	-6	12
Darin Kimble	55	7	3	10	4	177
Glen Featherstone	34	5	5	10	6	102
Brent Hughes	62	5	4	9	-4	191
C. J. Young †	15	4	5	9	1	12
Peter Douris	19	4	4	8	5	4
Tim Sweeney	14	1	7	8	1	6
Glen Murray	27	3	4	7	-6	8
Jim Wiemer	28	1	6	7	1	48
Stephane Richer †	21	1	4	5	-6	18
Brent Ashton ‡	26	2	2	4	0	11
Andrew McKim	7	1	3	4	2	0
Bryan Smolinski	9	1	3	4	3	0
Jozef Stumpel	13	1	3	4	-3	4
Darren Banks	16	2	1	3	5	64
Chris Winnes	5	0	1	1	1	0
Sergei Zoltoks	1	0	1	1	1	0
Denis Chervyakov	2	0	0	0	-1	2
Bill Huard	2	0	0	0	0	0
Dominic Lavoie †	2	0	0	0	-1	2
Total		332	560	892	—	1,518

Playoffs
Player	GP	G	A	Pts	+/-	PIM
Adam Oates	4	0	9	9	0	4
Joe Juneau	4	2	4	6	-1	6
Cam Neely	4	4	1	5	0	4
Steve Heinze	4	1	1	2	-1	2
Stephen Leach	4	1	1	2	0	2
Dave Poulin	4	1	1	2	-3	10
Ray Bourque	4	1	0	1	-2	2
Peter Douris	4	1	0	1	-3	0
Bryan Smolinski	4	1	0	1	-1	2
Ted Donato	4	0	1	1	-7	0
David Shaw	4	0	1	1	-3	6
Brent Hughes	1	0	0	0	0	2
Darin Kimble	4	0	0	0	0	2
Dmitri Kvartalnov	4	0	0	0	0	0
Stephane Richer	3	0	0	0	-2	0
Gordie Roberts	4	0	0	0	-2	6
Don Sweeney	4	0	0	0	-1	4
Tim Sweeney	3	0	0	0	0	0
Glen Wesley	4	0	0	0	-2	0
Jim Wiemer	1	0	0	0	-1	4
Total		12	19	31	—	56

=== Goaltending ===
Regular season
Player	GP	GS	TOI	W	L	T	GA	GAA	SA	SV%	SO	G	A	PIM
Andy Moog	55	55	3,193:49	37	14	3	168	3.16	1,357	.876	3	0	1	14
John Blue	23	21	1,322:02	9	8	4	64	2.90	597	.893	1	0	2	6
Rejean Lemelin	10	8	541:43	5	4	0	31	3.43	225	.862	0	0	0	4
Mike Bales	1	0	24:48	0	0	0	1	2.42	10	.900	0	0	0	0
Total			5,082:22	51	26	7	264	3.12	2,189	.879	4	0	3	24

Playoffs
Player	GP	GS	TOI	W	L	GA	GAA	SA	SV%	SO	G	A	PIM
John Blue	2	1	96:02	0	1	5	3.12	49	.898	0	0	0	0
Andy Moog	3	3	160:54	0	3	14	5.22	67	.791	0	0	0	0
Total			256:56	0	4	19	4.44	116	.836	0	0	0	0

† Denotes player spent time with another team before joining the Bruins. Stats reflect time with the Bruins only.
‡ Denotes player was traded mid-season. Stats reflect time with the Bruins only.

Note:

Pos = Position;GP = Games played; G = Goals; A = Assists; Pts = Points; PIM = Penalty minutes; +/- = Plus/minus; PPG = Power-play goals; SHG = Short-handed goals; GWG = Game-winning goals
Pos = Position;GP = Games played; Min, TOI = Minutes played; W = Wins; L = Losses; T,T/OT = Ties; OTL = Overtime losses; GA = Goals-against; GAA = Goals-against average; SO = Shutouts; SA = Shots against; SV = Shots saved;SV% = Save percentage;

== Awards and records ==
- Ray Bourque, runner up, Norris Trophy

During the postseason awards ceremony, Bruin players finished as runner-up on many of the awards; Bourque for the Norris, Oates for the Art Ross and Lady Byng Trophies, Joe Juneau (who had broken the NHL record for assists in a season by a left-winger, a mark he still holds) for the Calder Trophy, Dave Poulin for the Frank J. Selke Trophy, Moog for the William M. Jennings Trophy, and coach Brian Sutter for the Jack Adams Award. Bourque was named to the NHL All-Star First Team and Juneau to the NHL All-Rookie Team, while Oates finished third in voting among centermen for the All-Star First/Second Teams.

== Transactions ==
=== Trades ===
Date	Details	
June 10, 1992	To Winnipeg Jets Daniel Berthiaume	To Boston Bruins Doug Evans
September 2, 1992	To Minnesota North Stars Future considerations	To Boston Bruins David Shaw
September 4, 1992	To Tampa Bay Lightning Matt Hervey; Ken Hodge Jr.	To Boston Bruins Darin Kimble; Future considerations
October 28, 1992	To Tampa Bay Lightning Bob Beers	To Boston Bruins Stephane Richer
February 1, 1993	To Calgary Flames Brent Ashton	To Boston Bruins C.J. Young
March 18, 1993	To New York Islanders 1994 conditional 8th-round pick (#203 overall)	To Boston Bruins Daniel Marois

=== Free agents ===
Date	Player	Team
June 30, 1992	Bobby Carpenter	to Washington Capitals
July 16, 1992	Darren Banks	
July 23, 1992	Darryl Olsen	
July 23, 1992	Jamie Huscroft	
July 23, 1992	Andrew McKim	from Toronto Maple Leafs
July 23, 1992	Gordie Roberts	from Pittsburgh Penguins
September 4, 1992	Dave Thomlinson	to New York Rangers
September 16, 1992	Tim Sweeney	
October 5, 1992	Allan Stewart	
November 11, 1992	Andy Brickley	to Winnipeg Jets
December 4, 1992	Bill Huard	from New Jersey Devils
February 26, 1993	Darryl Olsen	to San Diego Gulls (IHL)
April 30, 1993	Fred Knipscheer	

=== Waivers ===
Date	Player	Team
October 4, 1992	Doug Evans	to Philadelphia Flyers in waiver draft
October 9, 1992	Bob Sweeney	to Buffalo Sabres
November 20, 1992	Dominic Lavoie	from Ottawa Senators

== Draft picks ==
Boston's draft picks at the 1992 NHL entry draft held at the Montreal Forum in Montreal, Quebec.

Round	#	Player	Position	Nationality	College/junior/club team (league)
1	16	Dmitri Kvartalnov	LW	Russia	San Diego Gulls (IHL)
3^{1}	55	Sergei Zholtok	C	Latvia	Riga Stars (Latvia)
5	112	Scott Bailey	G	Canada	Spokane Chiefs (WHL)
6^{2}	133	Jiri Dopita	C	Czechoslovakia	DS Olomouc (Czechoslovakia)
6	136	Grigorijs Pantelejevs	LW	Latvia	Riga Stars (Latvia)
8	184	Kurt Seher	D	Canada	Seattle Thunderbirds (WHL)
9	208	Mattias Timander	D	Sweden	Modo Hockey (Sweden)
10	232	Chris Crombie	LW	Canada	London Knights (OHL)
11	256	Denis Chervyakov	D	Russia	HK Riga (Latvia)
11^{3}	257	Yevgeni Pavlov	RW	Russia	SKA Saint Petersburg (Russia)

Notes

1. The Bruins acquired this pick as the result of a trade on January 2, 1992 that sent Garry Galley, Wes Walz and a third-round pick in 1993 to Philadelphia in exchange for Gord Murphy, Brian Dobbin, a fourth-round pick in 1993 and this pick.
2. The Bruins acquired this pick as the result of a trade on September 11, 1991 that sent Norm Foster to Edmonton in exchange for this pick.
3. The Bruins acquired this pick as the result of a trade on January 8, 1992 that sent Steve Bancroft and an eleventh-round pick in 1993 to Chicago in exchange for this pick.
- The Bruins second-round pick went to the Vancouver Canucks as the result of a trade on January 16, 1991 that sent Petri Skriko to Boston in exchange for this pick (40th overall).
- The Bruins third and seventh-round picks (64th and 160th overall) went to the St. Louis Blues as compensation for restricted free agents Glen Featherstone and Dave Thomlinson.
- The Bruins fourth-round pick went to the Minnesota North Stars as the result of a trade on August 21, 1990 that sent Ken Hodge Jr. to Boston in exchange for this pick (88th overall).

== See also ==
- 1992–93 NHL season
