= 1992–93 Montreal Canadiens season =

NHL hockey team season (won Stanley Cup)

1992–93 Montreal Canadiens
- Stanley Cup champions
- Wales Conference champions
- Division: 3rd Adams
- Conference: 4th Wales
- 1992–93 record: 48–30–6
- Home record: 27–13–2
- Road record: 21–17–4
- Goals for: 326
- Goals against: 280

Team information
- General manager: Serge Savard
- Coach: Jacques Demers
- Captain: Guy Carbonneau
- Alternate captains: Kirk Muller (Jan.–Apr.); Denis Savard; Brian Skrudland (Oct.–Jan.)
- Arena: Montreal Forum
- Average attendance: 17,018

Team leaders
- Goals: Brian Bellows (40)
- Assists: Vincent Damphousse (58)
- Points: Vincent Damphousse (97)
- Penalty minutes: Lyle Odelein (205)
- Plus/minus: Lyle Odelein (+35)
- Wins: Patrick Roy (31)
- Goals against average: Patrick Roy (3.20)

The 1992–93 Montreal Canadiens season was the team's 76th season in the National Hockey League (NHL) and their 84th overall. Coming off of a disappointing second round playoff exit against the Boston Bruins during the 1991–92 season, the third-straight season Boston had defeated Montreal in the playoffs, the Canadiens were champions for the 1992–93 season.

The 1992–93 Canadiens remain the last Canadian-based team to win the Stanley Cup, having won the 1993 Stanley Cup Final.

== Off-season ==
In the off-season, the Canadiens would replace head coach Pat Burns and hire former Quebec Nordiques, St. Louis Blues and Detroit Red Wings head coach Jacques Demers to take his spot. The team also made some trades during the summer, acquiring Vincent Damphousse from the Edmonton Oilers, and Brian Bellows from the Minnesota North Stars.

Denis Savard is named an alternate captain, following Mike McPhee's trade to the North Stars.

== Regular season ==
The Canadiens would get off to a quick start, sitting on top of the Adams Division with a 16–5–3 record in their opening 24 games. The team would slump to an 8–9–2 record in their next 19 games, and fall behind their provincial rivals, the Quebec Nordiques, in the standings. Montreal would get hot, going 17–4–1, to take a commanding lead in the division, but a late-season slump, as Montreal would have a record of 7–11–0 in their final 18 games, falling behind the Boston Bruins and Nordiques to finish third in the division with 102 points and a 48–30–6 record.

On January 25, 1993, rookie Ed Ronan scored just 14 seconds into the overtime period to give the Canadiens a 3–2 home win over the Boston Bruins. It would prove to be the fastest overtime goal scored during the 1992-93 NHL regular season.

Four Canadiens (Brian Bellows, Vincent Damphousse, Stephan Lebeau and Kirk Muller) reached the 30-goal plateau. In his first season with the team, Vincent Damphousse led the club offensively, scoring 39 goals and earning a team-high 97 points. Brian Bellows, also in his first season in Montreal, had a team-high 40 goals and finished with 88 points. Kirk Muller scored 37 goals and had 94 points, while Stephan Lebeau had a breakout season, scoring 80 points. Eric Desjardins led the blueline with 13 goals and 45 points, while Mathieu Schneider also recorded 13 goals from the blueline and finished with 44 points.

In goal, Patrick Roy played the majority of the games, leading the club with 31 wins and a 3.20 goals against average (GAA) in 62 games, as well as two shutouts. Andre Racicot backed-up Roy, winning 17 of 26 games played while posting a 3.39 GAA and a shutout.

At the beginning of the 1992–93 season, Upper Deck made Patrick Roy a spokesperson. Roy was an ideal choice as he was a hockey card collector, and his collection amounted to over 150,000 cards. An ad campaign was launched and it had an adverse effect on Roy's season. Upper Deck had a slogan called "Trade Roy", and it was posted on billboards throughout the city of Montreal. A Journal de Montreal poll, published on January 13, 1993, indicated that 57% of fans favoured trading Patrick Roy. Before the trading deadline, Canadiens General Manager Serge Savard insisted that he would consider a trade for Roy. The Canadiens would end the season by winning only 8 of their last 19 games.

=== All-Star Game ===
The 44th National Hockey League All-Star Game was played at the Montreal Forum, on February 6, 1993, where the Wales Conference beat the Campbell Conference, 16–6. Patrick Roy and Kirk Muller participated in the all-star game as members of the Wales Conference All-Stars.

=== Final standings ===
Adams Division
	GP	W	L	T	Pts	GF	GA
**Boston Bruins**	84	51	26	7	**109**	332	268
**Quebec Nordiques**	84	47	27	10	**104**	351	300
**Montreal Canadiens**	84	48	30	6	**102**	326	280
**Buffalo Sabres**	84	38	36	10	**86**	335	297
Hartford Whalers	84	26	52	6	58	284	369
Ottawa Senators	84	10	70	4	24	202	395

Note: GP = Games played, W = Wins, L = Losses, T = Ties, Pts = Points, GF = Goals for, GA = Goals against
Note: Teams that qualified for the playoffs are highlighted in bold.

Wales Conference
R		Div	GP	W	L	T	GF	GA	Pts
**1**	**p – Pittsburgh Penguins**	**PTK**	**84**	**56**	**21**	**7**	**367**	**268**	**119**
**2**	**Boston Bruins**	**ADM**	**84**	**51**	**26**	**7**	**332**	**268**	**109**
**3**	**Quebec Nordiques**	**ADM**	**84**	**47**	**27**	**10**	**351**	**300**	**104**
**4**	**Montreal Canadiens**	**ADM**	**84**	**48**	**30**	**6**	**326**	**280**	**102**
**5**	**Washington Capitals**	**PTK**	**84**	**43**	**34**	**7**	**325**	**286**	**93**
**6**	**New York Islanders**	**PTK**	**84**	**40**	**37**	**7**	**335**	**297**	**87**
**7**	**New Jersey Devils**	**PTK**	**84**	**40**	**37**	**7**	**308**	**299**	**87**
**8**	**Buffalo Sabres**	**ADM**	**84**	**38**	**36**	**10**	**335**	**297**	**86**
9	Philadelphia Flyers	PTK	84	36	37	11	319	319	83
10	New York Rangers	PTK	84	34	39	11	304	308	79
11	Hartford Whalers	ADM	84	26	52	6	284	369	58
12	Ottawa Senators	ADM	84	10	70	4	202	395	24

p – Won Presidents' Trophy (and division)
Divisions: PTK – Patrick, ADM – Adams
bold – Qualified for playoffs

== Playoffs ==
In the playoffs, the Canadiens opened up against their Battle of Quebec rivals, the Quebec Nordiques. Quebec finished in second place in the division, two points ahead of Montreal. Quebec opened the series with two wins on home ice, sending the series back to Montreal. The Canadiens responded in the third game with a 2–1 overtime win, to cut the Nordiques series lead to 2–1. Montreal followed that up with a solid 3–2 win in game four to even the series as it shifted back to Quebec City. Game five was not settled in regulation time, as the Canadiens and Nordiques were tied 4–4, and Montreal stunned the Nordiques home crowd with an overtime goal to win the game 5–4, and they take control of the series with a 3–2 lead, heading back to the Forum for the sixth game. Montreal then closed out the series at home, defeating the Nordiques 6–2 and advance to the second round of the playoffs for the tenth straight season.

Up next was the Buffalo Sabres, who had upset the division-winning Boston Bruins in the opening round. Montreal finished 16 points ahead of the Sabres during the regular season. The Canadiens, who ended their series with the Nordiques with four straight wins, continued their hot streak, defeating the Sabres by identical 4–3 scores in the opening two games, winning the second game in overtime. The series then moved to Buffalo, but Montreal recorded another 4–3 overtime victory, to take a commanding 3–0 series lead. The Habs swept Buffalo, with yet another 4–3 overtime win in game four, moving to the Conference final for the first time since 1989.

The Canadiens next opponent would be the surprising New York Islanders, who had just defeated the heavily favoured Pittsburgh Penguins to earn a spot in the Conference finals. The Islanders had 87 points in the regular season, 15 less than Montreal. The Canadiens stayed red hot, with a 4–1 victory in the first game, before winning 4–3 in double overtime to take a 2–0 series lead, and extend their winning streak to 10 games. Game three on Long Island again headed into overtime, with Montreal winning again, by a score of 2–1, to win their eleventh straight playoff game, tying the NHL record which was set by the Pittsburgh Penguins and Chicago Blackhawks in the 1992 playoffs. The Islanders held off the Canadiens in the fourth game to avoid the sweep and end the Canadiens' winning streak; however, Montreal closed out the series in the fifth game, and move to the Stanley Cup Final for the first time in four years.

Montreal's final opponent of the playoffs was the Los Angeles Kings. The Kings, led by Wayne Gretzky, had defeated the Calgary Flames, Vancouver Canucks, and Toronto Maple Leafs to earn their first ever trip to the Stanley Cup Final. Los Angeles finished the season with 88 points, 14 less than Montreal.

The first game, held at the Forum, belonged to the Kings, as they stunned the Montreal crowd with a 4–1 victory. Montreal rebounded in game two, as a late penalty call on Marty McSorley for using an illegal stick gave the Canadiens a late powerplay, on which they scored to tie the game up at 2–2. The game headed into overtime, and Montreal again prevailed, winning the game 3–2 to tie up the series. The series moved to Los Angeles for the third game, and Montreal continued their overtime magic, with a 4–3 OT victory to take a 2–1 series lead. The fourth game again headed into overtime, and again, the Canadiens won, their NHL record tenth consecutive overtime victory, to take a 3–1 series lead with the series headed back to Montreal for the fifth game. The Canadiens had few problems with a tired Kings team in the fifth game, winning 4–1, and earning their 24th Stanley Cup in team history. Patrick Roy was named the winner of the Conn Smythe Trophy. It remains the last time that Montreal won the Stanley Cup championship, as well as the last time a Canadian team won the Cup. Roy won two more Stanley Cups with the Colorado Avalanche in 1996 and 2001.

During their playoff run the team set an NHL playoff record for most overtime wins in one playoff with 10 with the team having an overall record of 10–1 in overtime.

== Schedule and results ==
=== Regular season ===
1992–93 regular season
October: 7–3–2 (home: 5–0–1; road: 2–3–1)

Game	Date	Visitor	Score	Home	OT	Decision	Record	Points	Recap
1	October 6, 1992	Montreal	5–1	Hartford		Roy	1–0–0	2	W
2	October 8, 1992	Montreal	3–5	Ottawa		Roy	1–1–0	2	L
3	October 10, 1992	Pittsburgh	3–3	Montreal	OT	Roy	1–1–1	3	T
4	October 11, 1992	Montreal	2–8	Buffalo		Racicot	1–2–1	3	L
5	October 15, 1992	Montreal	2–5	Pittsburgh		Roy	1–3–1	3	L
6	October 17, 1992	Minnesota	1–8	Montreal		Roy	2–3–1	5	W
7	October 19, 1992	St. Louis	2–6	Montreal		Roy	3–3–1	7	W
8	October 21, 1992	San Jose	4–8	Montreal		Roy	4–3–1	9	W
9	October 23, 1992	Montreal	3–3	NY Rangers	OT	Roy	4–3–2	10	T
10	October 24, 1992	Montreal	7–6	Philadelphia		Racicot	5–3–2	12	W
11	October 28, 1992	Tampa Bay	3–4	Montreal		Roy	6–3–2	14	W
12	October 31, 1992	NY Rangers	3–4	Montreal		Roy	7–3–2	16	W

November: 10–3–1 (home: 6–2–1; road: 4–1–0)

Game	Date	Visitor	Score	Home	OT	Decision	Record	Points	Recap
13	November 2, 1992	Winnipeg	1–2	Montreal		Racicot	8–3–2	18	W
14	November 4, 1992	Montreal	4–3	Detroit		Roy	9–3–2	20	W
15	November 7, 1992	Detroit	1–5	Montreal		Roy	10–3–2	22	W
16	November 9, 1992	Calgary	2–5	Montreal		Roy	11–3–2	24	W
17	November 11, 1992	Montreal	8–3	New Jersey		Roy	12–3–2	26	W
18	November 14, 1992	Philadelphia	4–3	Montreal	OT	Roy	12–4–2	26	L
19	November 16, 1992	Boston	3–6	Montreal		Roy	13–4–2	28	W
20	November 17, 1992	Montreal	5–3	Ottawa		Racicot	14–4–2	30	W
21	November 19, 1992	Montreal	3–4	Quebec		Roy	14–5–2	30	L
22	November 21, 1992	Ottawa	1–3	Montreal		Racicot	15–5–2	32	W
23	November 23, 1992	Washington	1–1	Montreal	OT	Roy	15–5–3	33	T
24	November 25, 1992	Montreal	6–1	Hartford		Racicot	16–5–3	35	W
25	November 28, 1992	Vancouver	6–5	Montreal		Roy	16–6–3	35	W
26	November 30, 1992	Buffalo	0–3	Montreal		Roy	17–6–3	37	W

December: 5–8–1 (home: 2–3–0; road: 3–5–1)

Game	Date	Visitor	Score	Home	OT	Decision	Record	Points	Recap
27	December 3, 1992	Montreal	3–4	Boston		Roy	17–7–3	37	L
28	December 5, 1992	Montreal	3–2	Winnipeg	OT	Racicot	18–7–3	39	W
29	December 6, 1992	Montreal	0–2	Chicago		Roy	18–8–3	39	L
30	December 8, 1992	Montreal	5–5	Los Angeles (at Phoenix, Arizona)	OT	Roy	18–8–4	40	T
31	December 12, 1992	Boston	1–5	Montreal		Roy	19–8–4	42	W
32	December 13, 1992	Montreal	5–10	NY Rangers		Racicot	19–9–4	42	L
33	December 16, 1992	Quebec	5–1	Montreal		Roy	19–9–4	42	L
34	December 17, 1992	Montreal	8–3	Quebec		Roy	20–9–4	44	W
35	December 19, 1992	Buffalo	2–4	Montreal		Roy	21–10–4	46	W
36	December 21, 1992	Hartford	5–2	Montreal		Roy	21–11–4	46	L
37	December 23, 1992	NY Islanders	6–2	Montreal		Roy	21–12–4	46	L
38	December 27, 1992	Montreal	2–5	Vancouver		Roy	21–13–4	46	L
39	December 29, 1992	Montreal	6–3	Edmonton		Racicot	22–13–4	48	W
40	December 31, 1992	Montreal	3–5	Calgary		Roy	22–14–4	48	L

January: 10–4–1 (home: 7–2–0; road: 3–2–1)

Game	Date	Visitor	Score	Home	OT	Decision	Record	Points	Recap
41	January 2, 1993	Montreal	5–5	Los Angeles	OT	Roy	22–14–5	49	T
42	January 4, 1993	San Jose	1–4	Montreal (at Sacramento, California)		Racicot	23–14–5	51	W
43	January 5, 1993	Montreal	2–1	San Jose		Roy	24–14–5	53	W
44	January 9, 1993	Toronto	5–4	Montreal		Roy	24–15–5	53	L
45	January 10, 1993	Montreal	7–5	Hartford		Racicot	25–15–5	55	W
46	January 13, 1993	Hartford	3–7	Montreal		Racicot	26–15–5	57	W
47	January 14, 1993	Montreal	5–3	Quebec		Roy	27–15–5	59	W
48	January 16, 1993	NY Rangers	0–3	Montreal		Roy	28–15–5	61	W
49	January 20, 1993	New Jersey	2–3	Montreal		Roy	29–15–5	63	W
50	January 22, 1993	Montreal	2–6	New Jersey		Racicot	29–16–5	63	L
51	January 23, 1993	Montreal	0–4	Toronto		Roy	29–17–5	63	L
52	January 25, 1993	Boston	2–3	Montreal	OT	Roy	30–17–5	65	W
53	January 27, 1993	Hartford	6–5	Montreal		Roy	30–18–5	65	L
54	January 30, 1993	Ottawa	3–5	Montreal		Roy	31–18–5	67	W
55	January 31, 1993	Philadelphia	4–6	Montreal		Racicot	32–18–5	69	W

February: 8–1–1 (home: 4–1–0; road: 4–0–1)

Game	Date	Visitor	Score	Home	OT	Decision	Record	Points	Recap
56	February 3, 1993	Los Angeles	2–7	Montreal		Racicot	33–18–5	71	W
NHL All-Star Game in Montreal, QC
57	February 9, 1993	Montreal	5–3	NY Islanders		Roy	34–18–5	73	W
58	February 11, 1993	Montreal	0–0	Philadelphia	OT	Racicot	34–18–6	74	T
59	February 13, 1993	Montreal	4–1	Ottawa		Roy	35–18–6	76	W
60	February 17, 1993	Boston	5–2	Montreal		Roy	35–19–6	76	L
61	February 20, 1993	Ottawa	4–5	Montreal		Racicot	36–19–6	78	W
62	February 21, 1993	Edmonton	3–4	Montreal		Roy	37–19–6	80	W
63	February 23, 1993	Montreal	5–1	St. Louis		Roy	38–19–6	82	W
64	February 26, 1993	Montreal	6–4	Buffalo		Roy	39–18–6	84	W
65	February 27, 1993	Buffalo	4–8	Montreal		Roy	40–18–6	86	W

March: 6–7–0 (home: 3–3–0; road: 3–4–0)

Game	Date	Visitor	Score	Home	OT	Decision	Record	Points	Recap
66	March 1, 1993	Montreal	5–2	Boston		Roy	41–19–6	88	W
67	March 3, 1993	Montreal	1–3	Tampa Bay		Roy	41–20–6	88	L
68	March 6, 1993	Montreal	3–4	Minnesota		Roy	41–21–6	88	L
69	March 10, 1993	NY Islanders	1–5	Montreal		Racicot	42–21–6	90	W
70	March 11, 1993	Montreal	2–5	Boston		Racicot	42–22–6	90	L
71	March 13, 1993	Quebec	5–2	Montreal		Roy	42–23–6	90	L
72	March 18, 1993	Montreal	5–2	Quebec		Roy	43–23–6	92	W
73	March 20, 1993	Chicago	2–6	Montreal		Roy	44–23–6	94	W
74	March 22, 1993	Buffalo	8–3	Montreal		Roy	44–24–6	94	L
75	March 24, 1993	Montreal	6–5	Hartford	OT	Racicot	45–24–6	96	W
76	March 25, 1993	Montreal	0–2	Boston		Roy	45–25–6	96	L
77	March 27, 1993	Ottawa	3–4	Montreal	OT	Roy	46–25–6	98	W
78	March 31, 1993	Quebec	6–2	Montreal		Roy	46–26–6	98	L

April: 2–4–0 (home: 0–2–0; road: 2–2–0)

Game	Date	Visitor	Score	Home	OT	Decision	Record	Points	Recap
79	April 2, 1993	Montreal	0–4	Washington		Roy	46–27–6	98	L
80	April 3, 1993	Montreal	3–2	NY Islanders		Racicot	47–27–6	100	W
81	April 7, 1993	Montreal	3–4	Pittsburgh	OT	Roy	47–28–6	100	L
82	April 10, 1993	Boston	5–1	Montreal		Roy	47–29–6	100	L
83	April 12, 1993	Washington	3–2	Montreal	OT	Roy	47–30–6	100	L
84	April 13, 1993	Montreal	3–2	Buffalo	OT	Racicot	48–30–6	102	W

Legend: W Win (2 points) L Loss (0 points) T Tie (1 point)

=== Playoffs ===
1993 Stanley Cup playoffs
Adams Division Semifinals vs. (A2) Quebec Nordiques – Canadiens win 4–2

Game	Date	Visitor	Score	Home	OT	Decision	Series	Recap
1	April 18, 1993	Montreal	2–3	Quebec	OT	Roy	0–1	L
2	April 20, 1993	Montreal	1–4	Quebec		Roy	0–2	L
3	April 22, 1993	Quebec	1–2	Montreal	OT	Roy	1–2	W
4	April 24, 1993	Quebec	2–3	Montreal		Roy	2–2	W
5	April 26, 1993	Montreal	5–4	Quebec	OT	Roy	3–2	W
6	April 28, 1993	Quebec	2–6	Montreal		Roy	4–2	W

Adams Division Finals vs. (A4) Buffalo Sabres – Canadiens win 4–0

Game	Date	Visitor	Score	Home	OT	Decision	Series	Recap
1	May 2, 1993	Buffalo	3–4	Montreal		Roy	1–0	W
2	May 4, 1993	Buffalo	3–4	Montreal	OT	Roy	2–0	W
3	May 6, 1993	Montreal	4–3	Buffalo	OT	Roy	3–0	W
4	May 8, 1993	Montreal	4–3	Buffalo	OT	Roy	4–0	W

Wales Conference Finals vs. (P3) New York Islanders – Canadiens win 4–1

Game	Date	Visitor	Score	Home	OT	Decision	Series	Recap
1	May 16, 1993	NY Islanders	1–4	Montreal		Roy	1–0	W
2	May 18, 1993	NY Islanders	3–4	Montreal	2OT	Roy	2–0	W
3	May 20, 1993	Montreal	2–1	NY Islanders	OT	Roy	3–0	W
4	May 22, 1993	Montreal	1–4	NY Islanders		Roy	3–1	L
5	May 24, 1993	NY Islanders	2–5	Montreal		Roy	4–1	W

Stanley Cup Finals vs. (S3) Los Angeles Kings – Canadiens win 4–1

Game	Date	Visitor	Score	Home	OT	Decision	Series	Recap
1	June 1, 1993	Los Angeles	4–1	Montreal		Roy	0–1	L
2	June 3, 1993	Los Angeles	2–3	Montreal	OT	Roy	1–1	W
3	June 5, 1993	Montreal	4–3	Los Angeles	OT	Roy	2–1	W
4	June 7, 1993	Montreal	3–2	Los Angeles	OT	Roy	3–1	W
5	June 9, 1993	Los Angeles	1–4	Montreal		Roy	4–1	W

Legend: W Win L Loss

== Player statistics ==
=== Regular season ===
Scoring

Player	Pos	GP	G	A	Pts	PIM	+/-	PPG	SHG	GWG
Vincent Damphousse	C	84	39	58	97	98	5	9	3	8
Kirk Muller	LW	80	37	57	94	77	8	12	0	4
Brian Bellows	LW	82	40	48	88	44	4	16	0	5
Stephan Lebeau	C	71	31	49	80	20	23	8	0	7
Mike Keane	RW	77	15	45	60	95	29	0	0	1
Denis Savard	C	63	16	34	50	90	1	4	1	2
Gilbert Dionne	LW	75	20	28	48	63	5	6	1	2
Eric Desjardins	D	82	13	32	45	98	20	7	0	1
John LeClair	LW	72	19	25	44	33	11	2	0	2
Mathieu Schneider	D	60	13	31	44	91	8	3	0	2
Patrice Brisebois	D	70	10	21	31	79	6	4	0	2
Kevin Haller	D	73	11	14	25	117	7	6	0	1
Benoit Brunet	LW	47	10	15	25	19	13	0	0	1
J. J. Daigneault	D	66	8	10	18	57	25	0	0	1
Gary Leeman	RW	20	6	12	18	14	9	1	0	1
Guy Carbonneau	C	61	4	13	17	20	-9	0	1	0
Paul DiPietro	C	29	4	13	17	14	11	0	0	0
Lyle Odelein	D	83	2	14	16	205	35	0	0	0
Todd Ewen	RW	75	5	9	14	193	6	0	0	1
Ed Ronan	RW	53	5	7	12	20	6	0	0	1
Brian Skrudland	C	23	5	3	8	55	1	0	2	1
Mario Roberge	LW	50	4	4	8	142	2	0	0	3
Sean Hill	D	31	2	6	8	54	-5	1	0	1
Jesse Belanger	C	19	4	2	6	4	1	0	0	0
Oleg Petrov	RW	9	2	1	3	10	2	0	0	1
Donald Dufresne	D	32	1	2	3	32	0	0	0	0
Patrick Roy	G	62	0	2	2	16	0	0	0	0
Andre Racicot	G	26	0	1	1	6	0	0	0	0
Rob Ramage	D	8	0	1	1	8	-3	0	0	0
Patrik Carnback	C	6	0	0	0	2	-4	0	0	0
Frederic Chabot	G	1	0	0	0	0	0	0	0	0
Eric Charron	D	3	0	0	0	2	0	0	0	0
Patric Kjellberg	RW	7	0	0	0	2	-3	0	0	0
Turner Stevenson	RW	1	0	0	0	0	-1	0	0	0

Goaltending

Player	MIN	GP	W	L	T	GA	GAA	SO	SA	SV	SV%
Patrick Roy	3595	62	31	25	5	192	3.20	2	1814	1622	.894
Andre Racicot	1433	26	17	5	1	81	3.39	1	682	601	.881
Frederic Chabot	40	1	0	0	0	1	1.50	0	19	18	.947
Team:	5068	84	48	30	6	274	3.24	3	2515	2241	.891

=== Playoffs ===
Scoring

Player	Pos	GP	G	A	Pts	PIM	PPG	SHG	GWG
Vincent Damphousse	C	20	11	12	23	16	5	0	3
Kirk Muller	LW	20	10	7	17	18	3	0	3
Brian Bellows	LW	18	6	9	15	18	2	0	0
Mike Keane	RW	19	2	13	15	6	0	0	0
Eric Desjardins	D	20	4	10	14	23	1	0	1
Paul DiPietro	C	17	8	5	13	8	0	0	1
Gilbert Dionne	LW	20	6	6	12	20	1	0	1
John LeClair	LW	20	4	6	10	14	0	0	3
Benoit Brunet	LW	20	2	8	10	8	1	0	1
Kevin Haller	D	17	1	6	7	16	1	0	0
Guy Carbonneau	C	20	3	3	6	10	0	1	2
Stephan Lebeau	C	13	3	3	6	6	1	0	1
Lyle Odelein	D	20	1	5	6	30	0	0	0
Ed Ronan	RW	14	2	3	5	10	0	0	0
Denis Savard	C	14	0	5	5	4	0	0	0
J. J. Daigneault	D	20	1	3	4	22	0	0	0
Patrice Brisebois	D	20	0	4	4	18	0	0	0
Gary Leeman	RW	11	1	2	3	2	0	0	0
Mathieu Schneider	D	11	1	2	3	16	0	0	0
Jesse Belanger	C	9	0	1	1	0	0	0	0
Patrick Roy	G	20	0	1	1	4	0	0	0
Donald Dufresne	D	2	0	0	0	0	0	0	0
Todd Ewen	RW	1	0	0	0	0	0	0	0
Sean Hill	D	3	0	0	0	4	0	0	0
Oleg Petrov	RW	1	0	0	0	0	0	0	0
Andre Racicot	G	1	0	0	0	0	0	0	0
Rob Ramage	D	7	0	0	0	4	0	0	0
Mario Roberge	LW	3	0	0	0	0	0	0	0

Goaltending

Player	MIN	GP	W	L	GA	GAA	SO	SA	SV	SV%
Patrick Roy	1293	20	16	4	46	2.13	0	647	601	.929
Andre Racicot	18	1	0	0	2	6.67	0	9	7	.778
Team:	1311	20	16	4	48	2.20	0	656	608	.927

Note:

Pos = Position;GP = Games played; G = Goals; A = Assists; Pts = Points; PIM = Penalty minutes; +/- = Plus/minus; PPG = Power-play goals; SHG = Short-handed goals; GWG = Game-winning goals
Pos = Position;GP = Games played; Min, TOI = Minutes played; W = Wins; L = Losses; T,T/OT = Ties; OTL = Overtime losses; GA = Goals-against; GAA = Goals-against average; SO = Shutouts; SA = Shots against; SV = Shots saved;SV% = Save percentage;

== Awards and records ==
- Prince of Wales Trophy: Montreal Canadiens
- Conn Smythe Trophy: Patrick Roy
- Record: Ten consecutive playoff overtime wins
- Record: Eric Desjardins (game two) – only NHL defenceman to score a hat-trick in a Cup Final game

== Draft picks ==
Montreal's draft picks at the 1992 NHL entry draft.

Round	#	Player	Nationality	College/junior/club team (league)
1	20	David Wilkie	United States	Kamloops Blazers (WHL)
2	33	Valeri Bure	Russia	Spokane Chiefs (WHL)
2	44	Keli Corpse	Canada	Kingston Frontenacs (OHL)
3	68	Craig Rivet	Canada	Kingston Frontenacs (OHL)
4	82	Louis Bernard	Canada	Drummondville Voltigeurs (QMJHL)
4	92	Marc Lamothe	Canada	Kingston Frontenacs (OHL)
5	116	Don Chase	United States	Springfield Olympics (NEJHL)
6	140	Martin Sychra	Czechoslovakia	ZKL Brno (Czechoslovakia)
7	164	Christian Proulx	Canada	Saint-Jean Lynx (QMJHL)
8	188	Mike Burman	Canada	North Bay Centennials (OHL)
9	212	Earl Cronan	United States	St. Mark's School (USHS-MA)
10	236	Trent Cavicchi	Canada	Dartmouth Midgets (NS)
11	260	Hiroyuki Miura	Japan	Kushiro High School (Japan)

== Farm teams ==
- Fredericton Canadiens

== See also ==
- 1992–93 NHL season
