= Jim Agnew =

Canadian ice hockey player (born 1966)

- Born: March 21, 1966 (age 60) Deloraine, Manitoba, Canada
- Height: 6 ft 1 in (185 cm)
- Weight: 190 lb (86 kg; 13 st 8 lb)
- Position: Defence
- Shot: Left
- Played for: Hartford Whalers; Vancouver Canucks
- National team: Canada
- NHL draft: 157th overall, 1984; Vancouver Canucks
- Playing career: 1986–1993

Jim Agnew (born March 21, 1966) is a Canadian former professional hockey defenceman.

A stay-at-home, physical defender, Agnew was also an excellent fighter. He was drafted by the Vancouver Canucks in the eighth round (157th overall) in the 1984 NHL entry draft. After a stellar career in the Western Hockey League with the Brandon Wheat Kings and Portland Winter Hawks, Agnew turned pro and signed with the Canucks in 1986.

== Playing career ==
Agnew spent most of the 1986–87 in the AHL, although he did receive a four-game call-up to the Canucks. He would spend four full seasons in Vancouver's minor-league system while seeing occasional action in Vancouver - he played 10 games for the team in the 1987–88 and recorded his only career point, and was called up again for 7 games in 1989–90.

While playing for the Canucks in March 1990, Agnew seriously injured his left knee and required surgery. This would be the start of a chronic knee problem - injuries to his left knee caused him to miss significant action 6 times over the next four seasons, and required three separate surgeries.

Unfortunately, his knee problems struck just as he made the NHL on a full-time basis. He spent virtually the entire 1990–91 and 1991–92 seasons on the Canuck roster as a utility player seeing action at both forward and defence, but was limited to just 44 games over that stretch due to injury and failed to record a point.

He was released by the Canucks in 1992 and signed as a free agent with the Hartford Whalers. Again, however, he was limited to only 16 games by an injury to his left knee. After injuring his knee again during the Whalers' 1993 training camp, he decided to retire.

Agnew appeared in 81 NHL games over parts of six seasons, recording 1 assist and 257 penalty minutes.

After his playing days were over, Agnew moved to Missoula, Montana, became a United States citizen, and found work as a law enforcement officer.

== Career statistics ==
			Regular season					Playoffs
Season	Team	League	GP	G	A	Pts	PIM	GP	G	A	Pts	PIM
1982–83	Brandon Wheat Kings	WHL	14	1	1	2	9	—	—	—	—	—
1983–84	Brandon Wheat Kings	WHL	71	6	17	23	107	12	0	1	1	39
1984–85	Brandon Wheat Kings	WHL	19	3	15	18	82	—	—	—	—	—
1984–85	Portland Winter Hawks	WHL	44	5	24	29	223	6	0	2	2	44
1985–86	Portland Winter Hawks	WHL	70	6	30	36	386	9	0	1	1	48
1986–87	Fredericton Express	AHL	67	0	5	5	261	—	—	—	—	—
1986–87	Vancouver Canucks	NHL	4	0	0	0	0	—	—	—	—	—
1987–88	Fredericton Express	AHL	63	2	8	10	188	14	0	2	2	43
1987–88	Vancouver Canucks	NHL	10	0	1	1	16	—	—	—	—	—
1988–89	Milwaukee Admirals	IHL	47	2	10	12	181	11	0	2	2	34
1989–90	Milwaukee Admirals	IHL	51	4	10	14	238	—	—	—	—	—
1989–90	Vancouver Canucks	NHL	7	0	0	0	36	—	—	—	—	—
1990–91	Milwaukee Admirals	IHL	3	0	0	0	33	—	—	—	—	—
1990–91	Vancouver Canucks	NHL	20	0	0	0	81	—	—	—	—	—
1991–92	Vancouver Canucks	NHL	24	0	0	0	56	4	0	0	0	6
1992–93	Springfield Indians	AHL	1	0	1	1	2	—	—	—	—	—
1992–93	Hartford Whalers	NHL	16	0	0	0	68	—	—	—	—	—
NHL totals			81	0	1	1	257	4	0	0	0	6

== Awards ==
- WHL West First All-Star Team – 1986
