= Ken Belanger =

Canadian ice hockey player (born 1974)

- Born: May 14, 1974 (age 52) Sault Ste. Marie, Ontario, Canada
- Height: 6 ft 4 in (193 cm)
- Weight: 220 lb (100 kg; 15 st 10 lb)
- Position: Left wing
- Shot: Left
- Played for: Toronto Maple Leafs; New York Islanders; Boston Bruins; Los Angeles Kings
- NHL draft: 153rd overall, 1992; Hartford Whalers
- Playing career: 1994–2005

Kenneth Norman Belanger (born May 14, 1974) is a Canadian former professional ice hockey forward. He played in the National Hockey League (NHL) with the Toronto Maple Leafs, New York Islanders, Boston Bruins, and Los Angeles Kings from 1994 to 2005.

== Playing career ==
Born in Sault Ste. Marie, Ontario, Belanger started his National Hockey League career with the Toronto Maple Leafs in 1994. He also played for the New York Islanders, Boston Bruins and Los Angeles Kings. He retired a month into the 2005–06 NHL season. Belanger lives in Sault Ste. Marie, Ontario, and runs his own hockey school.

== Career statistics ==
			Regular season					Playoffs
Season	Team	League	GP	G	A	Pts	PIM	GP	G	A	Pts	PIM
1990–91	Sault Ste. Marie North Stars U18	GNML	43	24	29	53	169	—	—	—	—	—
1991–92	Ottawa 67s	OHL	51	4	4	8	174	11	0	0	0	24
1992–93	Ottawa 67s	OHL	34	6	12	18	139	—	—	—	—	—
1992–93	Guelph Storm	OHL	29	10	14	24	86	5	2	1	3	14
1993–94	Guelph Storm	OHL	55	11	22	33	185	9	2	3	5	30
1994–95	Toronto Maple Leafs	NHL	3	0	0	0	9	—	—	—	—	—
1994–95	St. John's Maple Leafs	AHL	47	5	5	10	246	4	0	0	0	30
1995–96	St. John's Maple Leafs	AHL	40	16	14	30	222	—	—	—	—	—
1995–96	New York Islanders	NHL	7	0	0	0	27	—	—	—	—	—
1996–97	New York Islanders	NHL	18	0	2	2	102	—	—	—	—	—
1996–97	Kentucky Thoroughblades	AHL	38	10	12	22	164	5	0	1	1	27
1997–98	New York Islanders	NHL	37	3	1	4	101	—	—	—	—	—
1998–99	New York Islanders	NHL	9	1	1	2	30	—	—	—	—	—
1998–99	Boston Bruins	NHL	45	1	4	5	152	12	1	0	1	16
1999–00	Boston Bruins	NHL	37	2	2	4	44	—	—	—	—	—
2000–01	Boston Bruins	NHL	40	2	2	4	121	—	—	—	—	—
2000–01	Providence Bruins	AHL	10	1	4	5	47	2	0	0	0	4
2001–02	Los Angeles Kings	NHL	43	2	0	2	85	—	—	—	—	—
2002–03	Los Angeles Kings	NHL	4	0	0	0	17	—	—	—	—	—
2004–05	Adirondack Frostbite	UHL	1	0	0	0	5	—	—	—	—	—
2005–06	Los Angeles Kings	NHL	5	0	0	0	7	—	—	—	—	—
NHL totals			248	11	12	23	695	12	1	0	1	16
