= Jamie Leach =

Canadian-born American ice hockey player

- Born: August 25, 1969 (age 57) Winnipeg, Manitoba, Canada
- Height: 6 ft 1 in (185 cm)
- Weight: 205 lb (93 kg; 14 st 9 lb)
- Position: Right wing
- Shot: Right
- Played for: Pittsburgh Penguins; Hartford Whalers; Florida Panthers
- NHL draft: 47th overall, 1987; Pittsburgh Penguins
- Playing career: 1989–2001

William "Jamie" Leach (born August 25, 1969) is a Canadian-born American former National Hockey League right wing. He is the son of former NHLer Reggie Leach. He was included on both Stanley Cup winning pictures with Pittsburgh in 1991 and 1992.

Leach grew up in Cherry Hill, New Jersey and played hockey at Cherry Hill High School East.

Leach did not qualify for a Cup inscription in 1991 as he had played too few NHL games that season (seven regular season games). He played enough games with the Pittsburgh Penguins in 1992 to get his name on the Stanley Cup.

== Career statistics ==
			Regular season					Playoffs
Season	Team	League	GP	G	A	Pts	PIM	GP	G	A	Pts	PIM
1985–86	New Westminster Bruins	WHL	58	8	7	15	20	—	—	—	—	—
1986–87	Hamilton Steelhawks	OHL	64	12	19	31	67	9	1	1	2	4
1987–88	Hamilton Steelhawks	OHL	64	24	19	43	79	14	6	7	13	12
1988–89	Niagara Falls Thunder	OHL	58	45	62	107	47	17	9	11	20	25
1989–90	Pittsburgh Penguins	NHL	10	0	3	3	0	—	—	—	—	—
1989–90	Muskegon Lumberjacks	IHL	72	22	36	58	39	15	9	4	13	14
1990–91	Pittsburgh Penguins	NHL	7	2	0	2	0	—	—	—	—	—
1990–91	Muskegon Lumberjacks	IHL	43	33	22	55	26	—	—	—	—	—
1991–92	Pittsburgh Penguins	NHL	38	5	4	9	8	—	—	—	—	—
1991–92	Muskegon Lumberjacks	IHL	3	1	1	2	2	—	—	—	—	—
1992–93	Springfield Indians	AHL	29	13	15	28	33	—	—	—	—	—
1992–93	Cleveland Lumberjacks	IHL	9	5	3	8	2	4	1	2	3	0
1992–93	Pittsburgh Penguins	NHL	5	0	0	0	2	—	—	—	—	—
1992–93	Hartford Whalers	NHL	19	3	2	5	2	—	—	—	—	—
1993–94	Cincinnati Cyclones	IHL	74	15	19	34	64	11	1	0	1	4
1993–94	Florida Panthers	NHL	2	1	0	1	0	—	—	—	—	—
1994–95	Cincinnati Cyclones	IHL	11	0	2	2	9	—	—	—	—	—
1994–95	San Diego Gulls	IHL	—	—	—	—	—	4	0	0	0	0
1995–96	Rochester Americans	AHL	47	12	14	26	52	2	0	0	0	0
1995–96	South Carolina Stingrays	ECHL	5	6	1	7	4	—	—	—	—	—
1996–97	Sheffield Steelers	BISL	36	17	20	37	26	—	—	—	—	—
1997–98	Nottingham Panthers	BISL	39	20	25	45	36	—	—	—	—	—
1998–99	Nottingham Panthers	BISL	32	16	13	29	14	—	—	—	—	—
1999–00	Nottingham Panthers	BISL	42	17	29	46	18	6	2	3	5	12
2000–01	Nottingham Panthers	BISL	46	16	10	26	16	6	1	3	4	2
NHL totals			81	11	9	20	12	—	—	—	—	—
