= President's Trophy (Canucks MVP) =

Ice hockey award

The President's Trophy was awarded to the most valuable player (MVP) of the Vancouver Canucks of the National Hockey League (NHL). It was awarded from 1974–75 to 1995–96. It was originally presented by CP Air and later Canadian Airlines and the player won a pair of airline tickets with the trophy. Many of the names matched the Cyclone Taylor Trophy (also awarded to the MVP as selected by the fans). After the 1995–96 season the President's Trophy was discontinued and the Cyclone Taylor Trophy became the sole Canucks MVP award.

== Winners ==
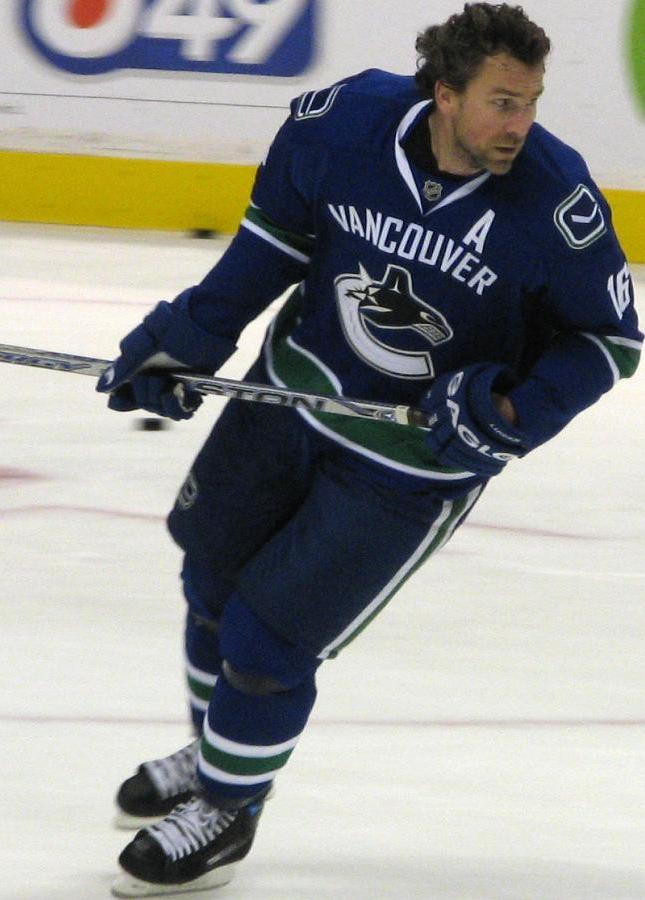
Four-time winner Trevor Linden (1989, 1991, 1995, 1996).

Season	Winner
1974–75	Gary Smith
1975–76	Bobby Lalonde
1976–77	Cesare Maniago
1977–78	Cesare Maniago
1978–79	Glen Hanlon
1979–80	Stan Smyl
1980–81	Richard Brodeur
1981–82	Richard Brodeur
1982–83	Stan Smyl
1983–84	Patrik Sundstrom
1984–85	Richard Brodeur
1985–86	Stan Smyl
1986–87	Barry Pederson
1987–88	Tony Tanti
1988–89	Trevor Linden
1989–90	Kirk McLean
1990–91	Trevor Linden
1991–92	Kirk McLean
1992–93	Pavel Bure
1993–94	Pavel Bure
1994–95	Trevor Linden
1995–96	Trevor Linden
