= Pavel Bure Most Exciting Player Award =

Ice hockey award

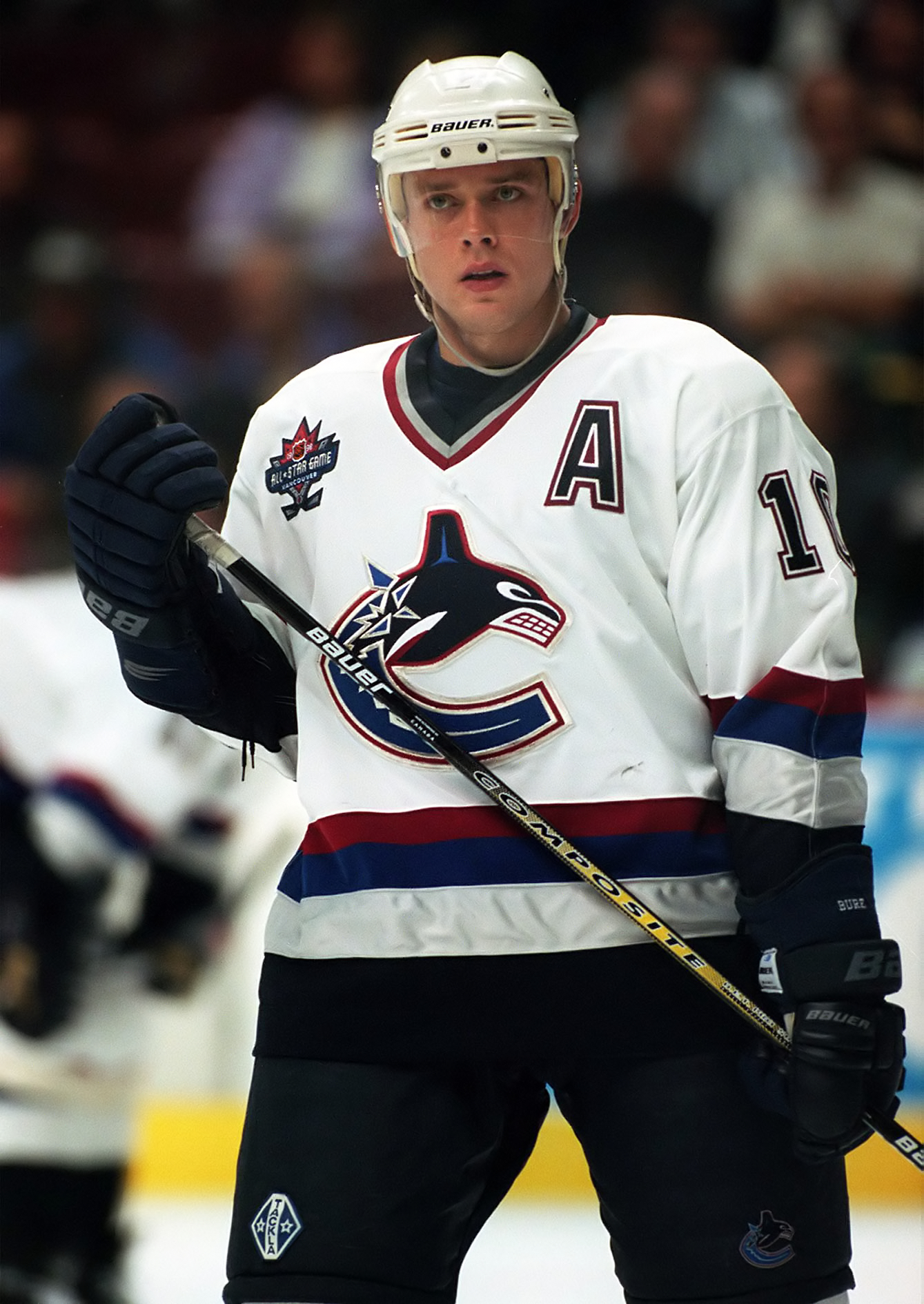
Five-time winner Pavel Bure (1992–1995, 1998).

The Pavel Bure Most Exciting Player Award is an annual award presented by the Vancouver Canucks of the National Hockey League (NHL) to the player judged to be team's most exciting as voted by the fans. It is one of six annual team awards presented to Canucks players, awarded on the last home game of the regular season. Although the Canucks media guide does not recognize any recipients prior to the 1992–93 season, there is record of an annual winner every year since the Canucks' inaugural NHL season in 1970. Prior to the 2013–14 Vancouver Canucks season, the award was simply known as the Most Exciting Player Award.

On November 1, 2013, Canucks Sports & Entertainment announced that it would renamed the award as the Pavel Bure Most Exciting Player Award in honour of the team's first Hockey Hall of Fame inductee and five-time winner of the award, Pavel Bure.

The most recent recipient is Zeev Buium, who won it for the first time in the 2025–26 season.

The most prolific award winners in award's history have been:

- Tony Tanti – 5 times (1984–1988)
- Pavel Bure – 5 times (1992–1995, 1998)
- Todd Bertuzzi – 4 times (2000, 2002–2004)
- Bobby Lalonde – 3 times (1975–1977)
- Alexandre Burrows – 3 times (2008–2010)

== Winners ==
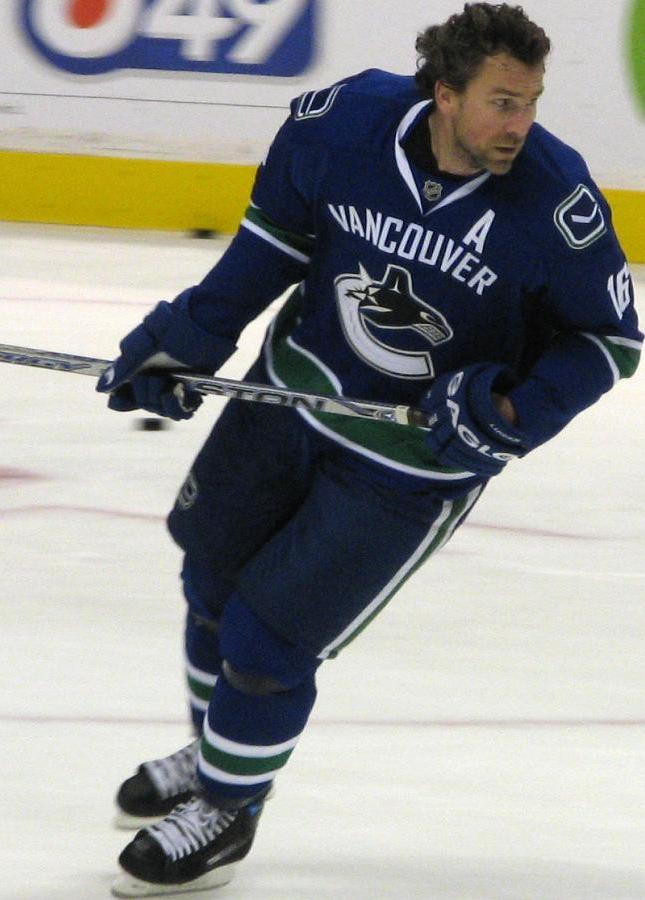
Two-time winner Trevor Linden (1989, 1991).

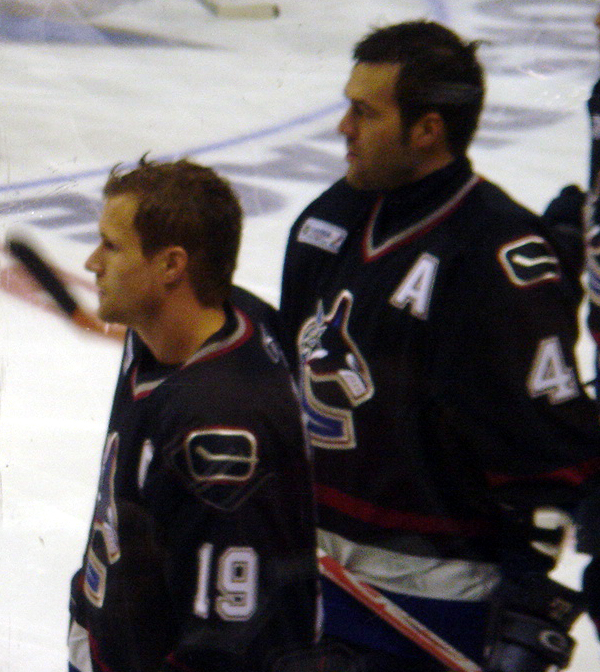
Two-time winner Markus Naslund (left; 1999, 2001) and four-time winner Todd Bertuzzi (right; 2000, 2002–2004).

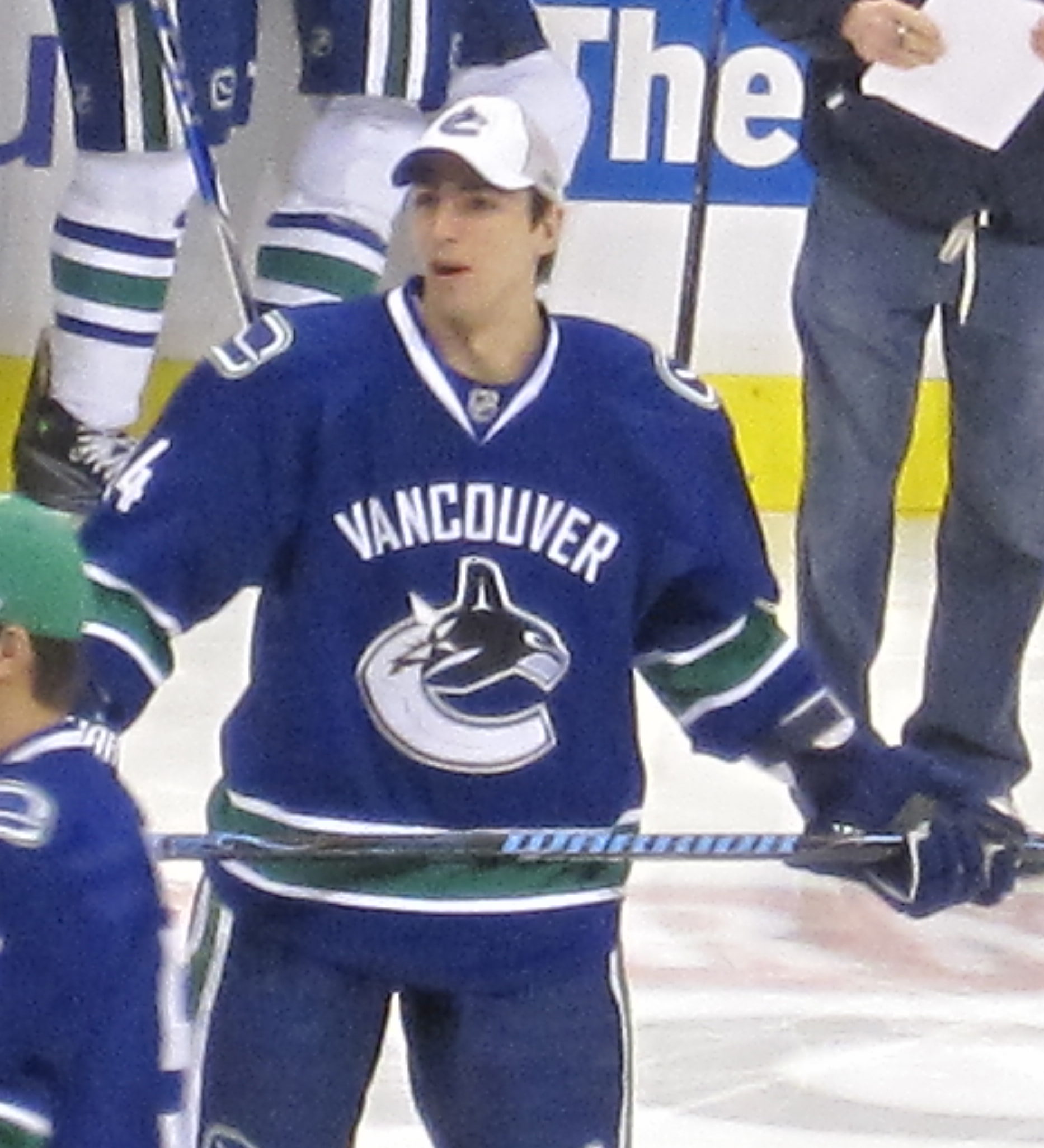
Three-time winner Alexandre Burrows (2008–2010).

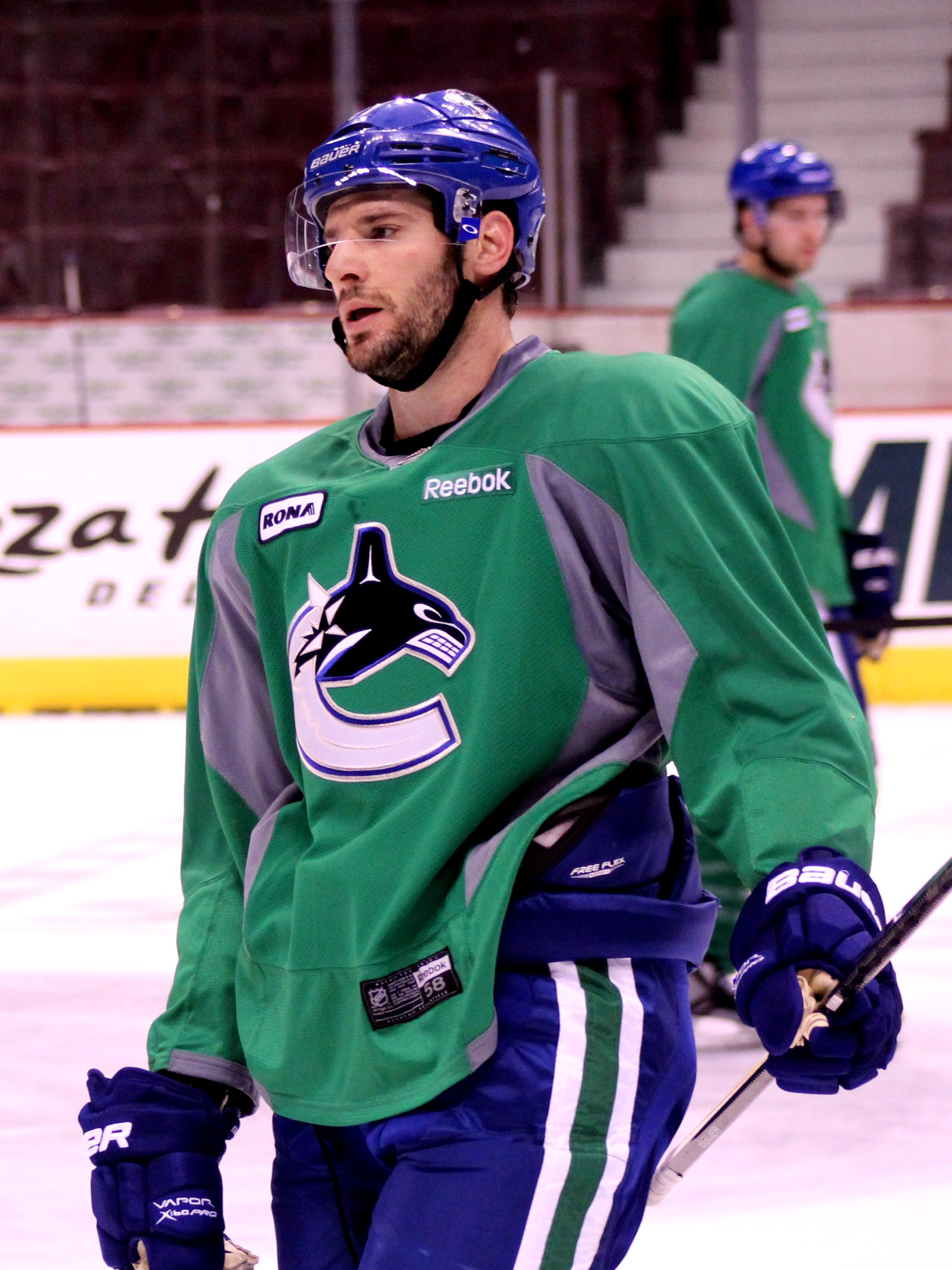
Ryan Kesler won the award in 2011.

Positions key
C	Centre	LW	Left wing	D	Defence	RW	Right wing	G	Goaltender

Player is still active with the Canucks.

Season	Winner	Position	Win #
1970–71	Andre Boudrias	C	1
1971–72	Andre Boudrias	C	2
1972–73	Bobby Schmautz	RW	1
1973–74	Don Lever	LW	1
1974–75	Bobby Lalonde	C	1
1975–76	Bobby Lalonde	C	2
1976–77	Bobby Lalonde	C	3
1977–78	Hilliard Graves	RW	1
1978–79	Thomas Gradin	C	1
1979–80	Stan Smyl	RW	1
1980–81	Tiger Williams	LW	1
1981–82	Thomas Gradin	C	2
1982–83	Darcy Rota	LW	1
1983–84	Tony Tanti	LW	1
1984–85	Tony Tanti	LW	2
1985–86	Tony Tanti	LW	3
1986–87	Tony Tanti	LW	4
1987–88	Tony Tanti	LW	5
1988–89	Trevor Linden	C	1
1989–90	Brian Bradley	C	1
1990–91	Trevor Linden	C	2
1991–92	Pavel Bure	RW	1
1992–93	Pavel Bure	RW	2
1993–94	Pavel Bure	RW	3
1994–95	Pavel Bure	RW	4
1995–96	Alexander Mogilny	RW	1
1996–97	Martin Gelinas	LW	1
1997–98	Pavel Bure	RW	5
1998–99	Markus Naslund	LW	1
1999–2000	Todd Bertuzzi	RW	1
2000–01	Markus Naslund	LW	2
2001–02	Todd Bertuzzi	RW	2
2002–03	Todd Bertuzzi	RW	3
2003–04	Todd Bertuzzi	RW	4
2004–05	Season cancelled due to the 2004–05 NHL lockout		
2005–06	Anson Carter	RW	1
2006–07	Roberto Luongo	G	1
2007–08	Alexandre Burrows	RW	1
2008–09	Alexandre Burrows	RW	2
2009–10	Alexandre Burrows	RW	3
2010–11	Ryan Kesler	C	1
2011–12	David Booth	LW	1
2012–13	Jannik Hansen	RW	1
2013–14	Zack Kassian	RW	1
2014–15	Radim Vrbata	RW	1
2015–16	Bo Horvat	C	1
2016–17	Bo Horvat	C	2
2017–18	Brock Boeser	RW	1
2018–19	Elias Pettersson	C	1
2019–20	Elias Pettersson	C	2
2020–21	Nils Hoglander	LW	1
2021–22	J. T. Miller	C/LW	1
2022–23	Andrei Kuzmenko	LW	1
2023–24	J. T. Miller	C/LW	2
2024–25	Quinn Hughes	D	1
2025–26	Zeev Buium	D	1

== See also ==
- Babe Pratt Trophy
- Cyclone Taylor Trophy
- Cyrus H. McLean Trophy
- Fred J. Hume Award
- Molson Cup
