= 1992–93 Vancouver Canucks season =

23rd season in franchise history

1992–93 Vancouver Canucks
- Smythe Division champions
- Division: 1st Smythe
- Conference: 3rd Campbell
- 1992–93 record: 46–29–9
- Home record: 27–11–4
- Road record: 19–18–5
- Goals for: 346
- Goals against: 278

Team information
- General manager: Pat Quinn
- Coach: Pat Quinn
- Captain: Trevor Linden
- Alternate captains: Doug Lidster; Ryan Walter
- Arena: Pacific Coliseum
- Average attendance: 15,418

Team leaders
- Goals: Pavel Bure (60)
- Assists: Cliff Ronning (56)
- Points: Pavel Bure (110)
- Penalty minutes: Gino Odjick (370)
- Plus/minus: Pavel Bure (+35)
- Wins: Kirk McLean (28)
- Goals against average: Kay Whitmore (3.10)

The 1992–93 Vancouver Canucks season was the Canucks' 23rd NHL season.

== Offseason ==
On September 21, Jim Robson, who had called Canucks play-by-play action since their WHL days, was given the Foster Hewitt Memorial Award for excellence in hockey broadcasting and inducted into the Hockey Hall of Fame. The Canucks were looking to build on the successes of the previous season, but they would have to do so without their top line centre. Instead of re-signing with the Canucks and having Sovintersport (the governing sports body in the former Soviet Union) continue to draw a portion of his salary, Igor Larionov decided to play the year in Lugano, Switzerland, and then return to the NHL the following season. With the loss of Larionov, more production would be hoped for from Petr Nedved, who was entering his third NHL season.

== Regular season ==
Keeping the rest of their cast in order, for the most part, the Canucks won their first four games, outscoring the opposition 24–9. They slumped back to .500 in early November but then exploded, going 20–5–2 in 27 games. During that time, Nedved racked up a club-record point-scoring streak. He recorded 24 points in 15 games before being held pointless in a 5–2 win over Montreal on December 27. On January 19, a first-place showdown took place at Pacific Coliseum, as the Canucks (with 61 points), had a chance to overtake Pittsburgh as the league's top team. However, the Canucks lost 5–2 and would never again get a chance to jump into first overall. The game also ended the club's amazing 18-game home unbeaten streak (16–0–2). Pavel Bure was scoring goals at an unprecedented pace for a Canuck and was voted to start in the 1993 NHL All-Star Game with 246,447 fan votes. On March 1, in a neutral-site game in Hamilton against Buffalo, Bure became the first Canuck to score 50 goals in a season. Grant Fuhr was the goaltender and RW Dixon Ward and Robert Dirk drew the assists on the goal in a 5–2 win for the Canucks. Exactly a month later, Bure scored on Tampa Bay's Pat Jablonski to become the first Canuck to record 100 points in a season. He would then record his 60th goal into an empty-net in a 6–3 win over Calgary on April 11, a game in which the Canucks clinched the division title for the second straight year. It was Bure's last goal of the season to go with 50 assists for 110 points—15th in the league. The day after Bure recorded his 100th point, long-time owner Frank Griffiths was elected to the Hockey Hall of Fame in the Builder's Category. Griffiths had owned the Canucks for 19 years now, although his son Arthur Griffiths had gradually taken over the day-to-day running of the team over the past decade. A couple of other noteworthy accomplishments took place that spring. Ryan Walter played in his 1,000th NHL game on March 20 in a 7–2 home loss to the New York Islanders, and Kirk McLean recorded his 127th victory as a Canuck on April 7, passing Richard Brodeur as the Canucks all-time wins leader, in a 5–4 overtime victory over Edmonton. The Canucks beat Los Angeles 8–6 on April 15, the final game of the season, to record their 46th victory and 100th and 101st points of the season. It was the first time the team eclipsed the century-mark in points. It was also the first time that there were six 70-point scorers on the team. Bure, Cliff Ronning (85), Geoff Courtnall (77), C Murray Craven (77), Trevor Linden (72), and Nedved (71) all reached that mark. As well, Gino Odjick broke his own team penalty-minutes record (370). The Canucks finished 4th in the league in goals with 346, had four 30-goal scorers, and led the league in most even-strength goals scored, with 249.

=== Standings ===
Smythe Division
	GP	W	L	T	Pts	GF	GA
**Vancouver Canucks**	84	46	29	9	**101**	346	278
**Calgary Flames**	84	43	30	11	**97**	322	282
**Los Angeles Kings**	84	39	35	10	**88**	338	340
**Winnipeg Jets**	84	40	37	7	**87**	322	320
Edmonton Oilers	84	26	50	8	60	242	337
San Jose Sharks	84	11	71	2	24	218	414

Note: GP = Games played, W = Wins, L = Losses, T = Ties, Pts = Points, GF = Goals for, GA = Goals against
Note: Teams that qualified for the playoffs are highlighted in bold.

== Playoffs ==
=== Division Semifinals ===
Once again the Canucks matched up with Winnipeg in the opening round. The Canucks rolled to victories in Games One and Two by 4–2 and 3–2 scores before being beaten almost single-handedly by Winnipeg's star rookie, Teemu Selanne. Selanne, who shattered the rookie goal-scoring record during the season with 76, scored three times in helping the Jets to a 5–4 win. Two nights later, the Canucks put a strangle hold on the series, winning 3–1 to take a series lead of the same score. It appeared that the Canucks were poised to eliminate the Jets in five, thereby avoiding the long, grinding seven-game series of a year ago which made them ill-prepared for the division finals. The Jets scrapped their way to a 3–3 tie through 60 minutes, though, and won in overtime when Selanne's centering pass hit LW Tim Hunter in the shin and re-directed past McLean. Back in Winnipeg on April 29, the rabid fans were determined to send the series to a decisive seventh game, and the teams battled to another 3–3 deadlock with 3.4 seconds to play and a faceoff deep in Winnipeg's end. The Canucks won the draw and Sergio Momesso managed a shot on goal, which sneaked through Bob Essensa and into the net as time expired. The Canucks jumped off the bench, thinking they had won the game and the series, but a lengthy video review was unable to determine if the puck had crossed the line before time expired and it was ruled no goal. Eight minutes into overtime Greg Adams drove hard to the Winnipeg net and was brought down by a Winnipeg backchecker. As he went down, the puck hit his skate and went into the net. Another replay was ordered, but this time a goal was awarded and the Canucks had won the series. There was little on-ice celebrating, though, as the incensed Winnipeg fans began littering the ice with debris, and so the teams quickly shook hands and vacated the playing surface.

=== Division Finals ===
The Division Final began on the afternoon of May 2 with the Canucks beating Los Angeles 5–2 to take the series lead. The Kings looked lethargic in the game, but came out gunning three nights later, as the dreaded combination of Wayne Gretzky and Jari Kurri accounted for five goals in the Kings 6–3 victory. In Game Three, the big scorers were at it again, as the Kings ran up a 7–4 win to take the series lead. The Canucks' big guns were not to be outdone, though, as they came back with an offensive onslaught have their own to win 7–2 in Game Four. Game Five was dominated by the Canucks, but Kelly Hrudey had his best outing of the series, keeping his Kings in a 3–3 tie through regulation time. Hrudey continued his theatrics in the fourth period, making several fine saves which included robbing Pavel Bure of what looked like a sure goal. But the Kings started to turn the tide in period number five and at the 6:31 mark Gary Shuchuk took a weak shot from a bad angle that found its way under Kirk McLean's arm to give the Kings the winning tally. The Canucks were now on the brink of elimination and played Game Six very cautiously. After trailing 1–0 after one period, Gerald Diduck and Jim Sandlak gave the Canucks the lead early in the second period, but Dana Murzyn picked a bad time to take two penalties on one play, one for high-sticking, the other for cross-checking. The Canucks managed to kill off the first penalty, but botched a line change as the second penalty began and were caught with too many men on the ice. The Kings scored three times, twice on the power plays, to take a 4–2 lead into the intermission. A Wayne Gretzky goal midway through the third period padded their lead, with Trevor Linden getting it back a few minutes later. With the score now 5–3, the Canucks pulled McLean to attempt the comeback, but there was no further scoring. For the second year in a row, the Canucks had been ousted in the second round after winning the division title. After over a decade of very modest post-season success, the fans of Vancouver were now hungry for something more.

== Schedule and results ==
=== Regular season ===
1992–93 regular season
October: 5–4–1 (home: 3–2–0; road: 2–2–1)

Game	Date	Visitor	Score	Home	OT	Decision	Attendance	Record	Points	Recap
1	October 6	Vancouver	5 – 4	Edmonton		McLean	14,094	1–0–0	2	W
2	October 10	Edmonton	2 – 5	Vancouver		McLean	14,879	2–0–0	4	W
3	October 12	Winnipeg	1 – 8	Vancouver		McLean	13,084	3–0–0	6	W
4	October 16	Vancouver	6 – 2	Winnipeg		Whitmore	14,785	4–0–0	8	W
5	October 18	Vancouver	1 – 3	Chicago		McLean	17,327	4–1–0	8	L
6	October 20	Vancouver	1 – 5	Pittsburgh		McLean	15,808	4–2–0	8	L
7	October 22	Vancouver	4 – 4	Philadelphia	OT	Whitmore	17,132	4–2–1	9	T
8	October 25	Boston	5 – 3	Vancouver		McLean	16,084	4–3–1	9	L
9	October 28	Washington	3 – 4	Vancouver		McLean	13,647	5–3–1	11	W
10	October 30	Minnesota	3 – 2	Vancouver		Whitmore	14,069	5–4–1	11	L

November: 9–5–1 (home: 6–0–1; road: 3–5–0)

Game	Date	Visitor	Score	Home	OT	Decision	Attendance	Record	Points	Recap
11	November 2	Vancouver	3 – 5	Calgary		McLean	18,519	5–5–1	11	L
12	November 4	Calgary	5 – 5	Vancouver	OT	McLean	13,655	5–5–2	12	T
13	November 6	Ottawa	1 – 4	Vancouver		McLean	15,332	6–5–2	14	W
14	November 8	Winnipeg	1 – 6	Vancouver		Whitmore	14,026	7–5–2	16	W
15	November 10	San Jose	2 – 6	Vancouver		McLean	13,448	8–5–2	18	W
16	November 12	Vancouver	4 – 7	Los Angeles		McLean	15,486	8–6–2	18	L
17	November 14	Vancouver	5 – 2	San Jose		Whitmore	11,089	9–6–2	20	W
18	November 16	Los Angeles	3 – 6	Vancouver		McLean	15,896	10–6–2	22	W
19	November 18	Vancouver	2 – 4	Edmonton		McLean	13,476	10–7–2	22	L
20	November 19	Vancouver	3 – 4	Calgary		Whitmore	19,169	10–8–2	22	L
21	November 21	Edmonton	0 – 9	Vancouver		McLean	15,960	11–8–2	24	W
22	November 23	Chicago	2 – 5	Vancouver		Whitmore	16,022	12–8–2	26	W
23	November 25	Vancouver	4 – 2	Minnesota		Whitmore	13,117	13–8–2	28	W
24	November 26	Vancouver	5 – 7	St. Louis		McLean	16,778	13–9–2	28	L
25	November 28	Vancouver	6 – 5	Montreal		McLean	17,639	14–9–2	30	W

December: 9–1–1 (home: 7–0–1; road: 2–1–0)

Game	Date	Visitor	Score	Home	OT	Decision	Attendance	Record	Points	Recap
26	December 3	Edmonton	1 – 4	Vancouver		McLean	15,589	15–9–2	32	W
27	December 7	St. Louis	3 – 4	Vancouver		Whitmore	14,709	16–9–2	34	W
28	December 9	San Jose	3 – 8	Vancouver		McLean	12,795	17–9–2	36	W
29	December 13	Quebec	3 – 3	Vancouver	OT	McLean	16,150	17–9–3	37	T
30	December 16	Vancouver	2 – 4	Edmonton		Whitmore	14,011	17–10–3	37	L
31	December 18	San Jose	1 – 8	Vancouver		McLean	14,511	18–10–3	39	W
32	December 19	Vancouver	6 – 3	San Jose		Whitmore	11,089	19–10–3	41	W
33	December 22	Vancouver	6 – 2	Los Angeles		McLean	16,005	20–10–3	43	W
34	December 27	Montreal	2 – 5	Vancouver		McLean	16,150	21–10–3	45	W
35	December 29	San Jose	5 – 7	Vancouver		Whitmore	16,150	22–10–3	47	W
36	December 31	Los Angeles	0 – 4	Vancouver		McLean	16,150	23–10–3	49	W

January: 6–4–5 (home: 3–1–2; road: 3–3–3)

Game	Date	Visitor	Score	Home	OT	Decision	Attendance	Record	Points	Recap
37	January 2	Vancouver	2 – 2	San Jose	OT	Whitmore	11,089	23–10–4	50	T
38	January 4	Tampa Bay	0 – 7	Vancouver		McLean	15,578	24–10–4	52	W
39	January 6	Vancouver	5 – 2	Toronto		McLean	15,720	25–10–4	54	W
40	January 8	Vancouver	3 – 6	Detroit		McLean	19,875	25–11–4	54	L
41	January 9	Vancouver	5 – 4	NY Islanders		Whitmore	11,661	26–11–4	56	W
42	January 11	Vancouver	3 – 3	NY Rangers	OT	McLean	17,641	26–11–5	57	T
43	January 12	Vancouver	2 – 3	New Jersey		Whitmore	9,125	26–12–5	57	L
44	January 15	Buffalo	1 – 4	Vancouver		McLean	16,150	27–12–5	59	W
45	January 16	Hartford	3 – 8	Vancouver		Whitmore	15,631	28–12–5	61	W
46	January 19	Pittsburgh	5 – 2	Vancouver		McLean	16,150	28–13–5	61	L
47	January 21	Vancouver	5 – 4	Los Angeles		McLean	16,005	29–13–5	63	W
48	January 23	Vancouver	3 – 3	Minnesota	OT	Whitmore	13,512	29–13–6	64	T
49	January 24	Vancouver	2 – 6	Chicago		McLean	17,859	29–14–6	64	L
50	January 27	Chicago	4 – 4	Vancouver	OT	Whitmore	16,150	29–14–7	65	T
51	January 30	Detroit	4 – 4	Vancouver	OT	McLean	16,150	29–14–8	66	T

February: 6–5–0 (home: 3–3–0; road: 3–2–0)

Game	Date	Visitor	Score	Home	OT	Decision	Attendance	Record	Points	Recap
52	February 1	Minnesota	5 – 4	Vancouver		McLean	14,830	29–15–8	66	L
53	February 3	Tampa Bay	2 – 4	Vancouver		Whitmore	14,171	30–15–8	68	W
54	February 9	Vancouver	5 – 1	Quebec		McLean	14,360	31–15–8	70	W
55	February 11	Vancouver	2 – 5	Toronto		McLean	15,720	31–16–8	70	L
56	February 12	Vancouver	3 – 1	Buffalo		Whitmore	16,325	32–16–8	72	W
57	February 15	Vancouver	0 – 3	Los Angeles		McLean	16,005	32–17–8	72	L
58	February 18	Philadelphia	3 – 2	Vancouver		Whitmore	16,150	32–18–8	72	L
59	February 20	Winnipeg	2 – 4	Vancouver		McLean	16,150	33–18–8	74	W
60	February 22	Toronto	8 – 1	Vancouver		McLean	16,150	33–19–8	74	L
61	February 24	NY Rangers	4 – 5	Vancouver		Whitmore	16,150	34–19–8	76	W
62	February 26	Vancouver	7 – 4	Winnipeg		McLean	15,398	35–19–8	78	W

March: 5–8–1 (home: 2–5–0; road: 3–3–1)

Game	Date	Visitor	Score	Home	OT	Decision	Attendance	Record	Points	Recap
63	March 1	Vancouver	5 – 2	Buffalo		Whitmore	17,098	36–19–8	80	W
64	March 2	Vancouver	3 – 3	Washington	OT	McLean	12,263	36–19–9	81	T
65	March 4	Vancouver	3 – 4	Boston		Whitmore	13,982	36–20–9	81	L
66	March 6	Vancouver	1 – 5	Hartford		McLean	12,048	36–21–9	81	L
67	March 9	New Jersey	2 – 7	Vancouver		McLean	15,822	37–21–9	83	W
68	March 11	Minnesota	4 – 3	Vancouver		Whitmore	12,006	37–22–9	83	L
69	March 12	Vancouver	3 – 2	Winnipeg		McLean	15,567	38–22–9	85	W
70	March 14	Vancouver	2 – 3	Calgary		McLean	20,214	38–23–9	85	L
71	March 18	Winnipeg	5 – 2	Vancouver		McLean	16,150	38–24–9	85	L
72	March 20	NY Islanders	7 – 2	Vancouver		Whitmore	16,150	38–25–9	85	L
73	March 22	St. Louis	3 – 1	Vancouver		McLean	15,871	38–26–9	85	L
74	March 24	Los Angeles	2 – 6	Vancouver		McLean	16,150	39–26–9	87	W
75	March 26	Calgary	3 – 1	Vancouver		McLean	16,150	39–27–9	87	L
76	March 30	Vancouver	6 – 3	St. Louis		McLean	17,573	40–27–9	89	W

April: 6–2–0 (home: 3–0–0; road: 3–2–0)

Game	Date	Visitor	Score	Home	OT	Decision	Attendance	Record	Points	Recap
77	April 1	Vancouver	5 – 3	Tampa Bay		Whitmore	10,425	41–27–9	91	W
78	April 3	Vancouver	1 – 5	Detroit		McLean	19,875	41–28–9	91	L
79	April 4	Vancouver	3 – 0	Ottawa		Whitmore	10,575	42–28–9	93	W
80	April 7	Edmonton	4 – 5	Vancouver	OT	McLean	15,858	43–28–9	95	W
81	April 9	Vancouver	1 – 8	Calgary		McLean	20,214	43–29–9	95	L
82	April 11	Calgary	3 – 6	Vancouver		McLean	16,150	44–29–9	97	W
83	April 13	Los Angeles	4 – 7	Vancouver		Whitmore	16,150	45–29–9	99	W
84	April 15	Vancouver	8 – 6	Los Angeles		Whitmore	16,005	46–29–9	101	W

Legend: W Win (2 points) L Loss (0 points) T Tie (1 point)

=== Playoffs ===
1993 Stanley Cup playoffs
Smythe Division Semifinals vs. (S4) Winnipeg Jets – Canucks win 4–2

Game	Date	Visitor	Score	Home	OT	Decision	Attendance	Series	Recap
1	April 19	Winnipeg	2 – 4	Vancouver		McLean		1 – 0	W
2	April 21	Winnipeg	2 – 3	Vancouver		McLean		2 – 0	W
3	April 23	Vancouver	4 – 5	Winnipeg		McLean		2 – 1	L
4	April 25	Vancouver	3 – 1	Winnipeg		McLean		3 – 1	W
5	April 27	Winnipeg	4 – 3	Vancouver	OT	McLean		3 – 2	L
6	April 29	Vancouver	4 – 3	Winnipeg	OT	McLean		4 – 2	W

Smythe Division Finals vs. (S3) Los Angeles Kings – Kings win 4–2

Game	Date	Visitor	Score	Home	OT	Decision	Attendance	Series	Recap
1	May 2	Los Angeles	2 – 5	Vancouver		McLean	16,150	1 – 0	W
2	May 5	Los Angeles	6 – 3	Vancouver		McLean	16,150	1 – 1	L
3	May 7	Vancouver	4 – 7	Los Angeles		McLean	16,005	1 – 2	L
4	May 9	Vancouver	7 – 2	Los Angeles		McLean	16,005	2 – 2	W
5	May 11	Los Angeles	4 – 3	Vancouver	2OT	McLean	16,150	2 – 3	L
6	May 13	Vancouver	3 – 5	Los Angeles		McLean	16,005	2 – 4	L

Legend: W Win L Loss

== Player statistics ==
=== Scoring ===
- Position abbreviations: C = Centre; D = Defence; G = Goaltender; LW = Left wing; RW = Right wing
- † = Joined team via a transaction (e.g., trade, waivers, signing) during the season. Stats reflect time with the Canucks only.
- ‡ = Left team via a transaction (e.g., trade, waivers, release) during the season. Stats reflect time with the Canucks only.

No.	Player	Pos	Regular season						Playoffs					
No.	Player	Pos	GP	G	A	Pts	+/-	PIM	GP	G	A	Pts	+/-	PIM
10	Pavel Bure	RW	83	60	50	110	35	69	12	5	7	12	0	8
7	Cliff Ronning	C	79	29	56	85	19	30	12	2	9	11	8	6
14	Geoff Courtnall	LW	84	31	46	77	27	167	12	4	10	14	7	12
16	Trevor Linden	RW	84	33	39	72	19	64	12	5	8	13	4	16
19	Petr Nedved	C	84	38	33	71	20	96	12	2	3	5	−2	2
8	Greg Adams	LW	53	25	31	56	31	14	12	7	6	13	−1	6
17	Dixon Ward	LW	70	22	30	52	34	82	9	2	3	5	1	0
20	Anatoli Semenov†	C	62	10	34	44	21	28	12	1	3	4	−1	0
21	Jyrki Lumme	D	74	8	36	44	30	55	12	0	5	5	4	6
27	Sergio Momesso	LW	84	18	20	38	11	200	12	3	0	3	1	30
25	Jim Sandlak	RW	59	10	18	28	2	122	6	2	2	4	−2	4
6	Adrien Plavsic	D	57	6	21	27	28	53	—	—	—	—	—	—
24	Jiri Slegr	D	41	4	22	26	16	109	5	0	3	3	0	4
3	Doug Lidster	D	71	6	19	25	9	36	12	0	3	3	3	8
18 (Note: Kron wore number 58 in his first game.)	Robert Kron‡	RW	32	10	11	21	10	14	—	—	—	—	—	—
4	Gerald Diduck	D	80	6	14	20	32	171	12	4	2	6	1	12
44	Dave Babych	D	43	3	16	19	6	44	12	2	5	7	−2	6
29	Gino Odjick	LW	75	4	13	17	3	370	1	0	0	0	0	0
5	Dana Murzyn	D	79	5	11	16	34	196	12	3	2	5	4	18
15	Tom Fergus	C	36	5	9	14	1	20	—	—	—	—	—	—
23	Garry Valk	LW	48	6	7	13	6	77	7	0	1	1	−3	12
22	Robert Dirk	D	69	4	8	12	25	150	9	0	0	0	−2	6
32	Murray Craven†	C	10	0	10	10	3	12	12	4	6	10	0	4
26	Tim Hunter†	RW	26	0	4	4	1	99	11	0	0	0	−5	26
9	Ryan Walter	C	25	3	0	3	−2	10	—	—	—	—	—	—
35	Kay Whitmore	G	31	0	3	3		2	—	—	—	—	—	—
1	Kirk McLean	G	54	0	1	1		16	12	0	3	3		0
26	Stephane Morin	C	1	0	1	1	−1	0	—	—	—	—	—	—
28	Dan Ratushny†	D	1	0	1	1	0	2	—	—	—	—	—	—
31	Shawn Antoski	LW	2	0	0	0	0	0	—	—	—	—	—	—

=== Goaltending ===
No.	Player	Regular season										Playoffs								
No.	Player	GP	W	L	T	SA	GA	GAA	SV%	SO	TOI	GP	W	L	SA	GA	GAA	SV%	SO	TOI
1	Kirk McLean	54	28	21	5	1615	184	3.39	.886	3	3261	12	6	6	369	42	3.34	.886	0	754
35	Kay Whitmore	31	18	8	4	858	94	3.10	.890	1	1817	—	—	—	—	—	—	—	—	—

== Awards and records ==
=== 1993 Canuck awards winners ===
- Molson Cup - Pavel Bure
- President's Trophy - Pavel Bure
- Ram Tough Award - Trevor Linden, Jim Sandlak
- Cyclone Taylor Trophy - Pavel Bure
- Cyrus H. McLean Trophy - Pavel Bure
- Babe Pratt Trophy - Dana Murzyn
- Fred J. Hume Award - Cliff Ronning
- Most Exciting Player Award - Pavel Bure

==== Pavel Bure ====
- Recorded first regular season hat-trick and first 4-goal game vs. Winnipeg on October 12, 1992.
- Molson Cup Player of the Month for November and December.
- Had 13 game point streak (12–10–22), longest of career and fourth longest in franchise history from January 3–30.
- Was voted in by the fans to represent the starting lineup of the Campbell Conference, at the 44th NHL All-Star Game in Montreal on February 6, 1993. Bure would score two goals in the game.
- Fastest Canuck to score 30 goals, doing it in 35 games, and 40 goals, doing it in 44 games.
- Scored his 50th goal on Grant Fuhr vs. Buffalo at Hamilton's Copps Coliseum on March 1, 1993. Becoming the first 50-goal scorer in club history.
- Scored on Pat Jablonski at Tampa Bay on April 1, 1993. Becoming the first Canuck to record 100 points in a season.
- Scored his 60th goal into an empty-net vs. Calgary on April 11, 1993.
- Finished 13th among NHL scorers and first among Canucks with 60–50–110.
- Finished 5th in NHL scoring with 60 goals.
- Finished 1st in NHL with 407 shots.
- Tied for 1st with 7 shorthanded goals, which is also a club record.
- Tied for 5th in plus-minus (+35).
- Holds and shares 15 regular season club records.

==== Trevor Linden ====
- Third straight season without missing a game (244 consecutive games).
- Moved into 8th on the Canucks all-time scoring list.
- Recorded his 300th career NHL and Canuck point vs. Tampa Bay on February 3, 1993.
- Molson Cup Player of The Month for February.

==== Cliff Ronning ====
- Molson Cup Player of the Month for October and March.
- Recorded his 100th career NHL goal vs. Winnipeg on February 20, 1993.
- Recorded a six-game point streak March 22-April 3, scoring 4–5–9.
- Scored a career high 3–3–6 vs. Los Angeles on April 15, 1993.

==== Dixon Ward ====
- Recorded first career NHL and Canuck point vs. Edmonton on October 6, 1992.
- Scored his first career NHL and Canuck goal vs. Winnipeg on October 12, 1992.
- Had his best game as a pro vs. Calgary on November 4, 1992, recording 2–2–4 and named first star of the game.
- Had two, four game point streaks.

==== Kirk McLean ====
- Established a franchise record with 12 career Canuck shutouts vs. Los Angeles on December 31, 1992, breaking Gary Smith's mark of 11 career Canuck shutouts.
- Played in his 300th career NHL game at Hartford on March 6, 1993.
- Recorded his 127th career victory to pass Richard Brodeur as the Canucks all-time wins leader vs. Edmonton on April 7, 1993.

==== Petr Nedved ====
- Runner-up for NHL Player of the Week during the first week of December.
- Recorded a franchise record 15 game point-scoring streak from November 19-December 27, scoring 15–9–24, breaking Darcy Rota's club record of 14 set in the 1982–83 season.
- Played in his 200th career NHL and Canuck game at Winnipeg on February 26, 1993.

==== Gino Odjick ====
- Sets franchise records with 47 penalty minutes in a game and in a period vs. Los Angeles on November 12, 1992.
- Had his best game as a pro scoring 2–1–3 and was a +3 vs. Chicago on November 23, 1992.

==== Greg Adams ====
- Had a seven-game point streak, scoring 6 goals, 3 assists for a total of 9 points from November 23-December 13.
- Recorded his 300th point as a Canuck vs. Montreal on December 27, 1992.

==== Geoff Courtnall ====
- Had an eight-game point streak, scoring 3 goals, 13 assists for a total of 16 points from November 21-December 9.
- Recorded his 500th career NHL point vs. Chicago on January 27, 1993.

==== Sergio Momesso ====
- Played in his 400th career NHL game vs. Winnipeg on October 12, 1992.
- Scored his 100th career NHL goal vs. Washington on October 28, 1992.

==== Dana Murzyn ====
- Recorded his 100th career NHL assist vs. Winnipeg on October 12, 1992.
- Played in his 500th career NHL game vs. Los Angeles on December 31, 1992.

==== Gerald Diduck ====
- Recorded 100th career NHL assist vs. Buffalo on January 15, 1993.
- Played his 500th career NHL game at Chicago on January 24, 1993.

==== Pat Quinn ====
- Sets club record with 46 wins in a single-season.
- Sets club record with 101 points in a single-season.

==== Others ====
- Adrien Plavsic played in his 100th career NHL game vs. Chicago on November 23, 1992.
- Robert Dirk played in his 200th career NHL game at Montreal on November 28, 1992.
- Jiri Slegr scored his first career NHL goal vs. Montreal on December 27, 1992.
- Dave Babych recorded his 600th career NHL point at Quebec on February 9, 1993.
- Tim Hunter played in his 600th career NHL game at Hamilton on March 1, 1993, vs. Buffalo.
- Kay Whitmore played in his 100th career NHL game at Saskatoon on March 11, 1993, vs. Minnesota.
- Jyrki Lumme played in his 300th career NHL game vs. Winnipeg on March 12, 1993.
- Ryan Walter played in his 1,000th career NHL game vs. NY Islanders on March 20, 1993.
- Murray Craven played in his 700th career NHL game at St. Louis on March 30, 1993.

== Transactions ==
=== Trades ===
October 1, 1992	To Vancouver Canucks Kay Whitmore	To Hartford Whalers Corrie D'Alessio; 5th round pick in 1993 (Scott Walker)
November 3, 1992	To Vancouver Canucks Anatoli Semenov	To Tampa Bay Lightning Dave Capuano; 4th round pick in 1994 (Ryan Duthie)
December 15, 1992	To Vancouver Canucks Rick Lessard	To San Jose Sharks Robin Bawa
January 29, 1993	To Vancouver Canucks Tim Taylor	To Washington Capitals Rick Murano
March 22, 1993	To Vancouver Canucks Murray Craven; 5th round pick in 1993 (Scott Walker)	To Hartford Whalers Robert Kron; Jim Sandlak; 3rd round pick in 1993 (Marek Malik)
March 22, 1993	To Vancouver Canucks Dan Ratushny	To Winnipeg Jets 9th round pick in 1993 (Harjis Vitolinsh).

==== Free agents acquired ====
Player	Former team
C Stephane Morin	Quebec Nordiques
LW Cam Danyluk	Undrafted player

==== Free agents lost ====
Player	New team
RW Andrew McBain	Ottawa Senators
D Jim Agnew	Hartford Whalers

==== Received from waivers ====
Player	Former team
RW Tim Hunter	Quebec Nordiques

==== Expansion draft ====
Vancouver's losses at the 1992 NHL expansion draft in Montreal, Quebec.

Round	#	Player	Nationality	Drafted by	Drafted from
1	13	Ken Hammond (D)	Canada	Ottawa Senators	Vancouver Canucks
1	23	Rob Murphy (C)	Canada	Ottawa Senators	Vancouver Canucks

== Draft picks ==
Vancouver's picks at the 1992 NHL entry draft in Montreal, Quebec.

Round	#	Player	Nationality	NHL team	College/junior/club team (league)
1	21	Libor Polasek (C)	Czechoslovakia	Vancouver Canucks	Vitkovice SSK (CSFR)
2	40	Michael Peca (C)	Canada	Vancouver Canucks (from Boston)	Ottawa 67's (OHL)
2	45	Mike Fountain (G)	Canada	Vancouver Canucks	Oshawa Generals (OHL)
3	69	Jeff Connolly (C)	United States	Vancouver Canucks	St. Sebastien High School (U.S. High School)
4	93	Brent Tully (D)	Canada	Vancouver Canucks	Peterborough Petes (OHL)
5	110	Brian Loney (RW)	Canada	Vancouver Canucks (from St. Louis)	Ohio State University (NCAA)
5	117	Adrian Aucoin (D)	Canada	Vancouver Canucks	Boston University (NCAA)
6	141	Jason Clark (C/LW)	Canada	Vancouver Canucks	St. Thomas Jr. B (?)
7	165	Scott Hollis (RW)	Canada	Vancouver Canucks	Oshawa Generals (OHL)
9	213	Sonny Mignacca (G)	Canada	Vancouver Canucks	Medicine Hat Tigers (WHL)
10	237	Mark Wotton (D)	Canada	Vancouver Canucks	Saskatoon Blades (WHL)
11	261	Aaron Boh (D)	Canada	Vancouver Canucks	Spokane Chiefs (WHL)

== Farm teams ==
=== Hamilton Canucks ===
Vancouver Canucks AHL affiliate that play in Hamilton, Ontario, and their home arena is the Copps Coliseum.

=== Columbus Chill ===
Vancouver Canucks ECHL affiliate that play in Columbus, Ohio, and their home arena is the Ohio Expo Center Coliseum.

== See also ==
- 1992–93 NHL season
