= Cyclone Taylor Trophy =

Ice hockey award

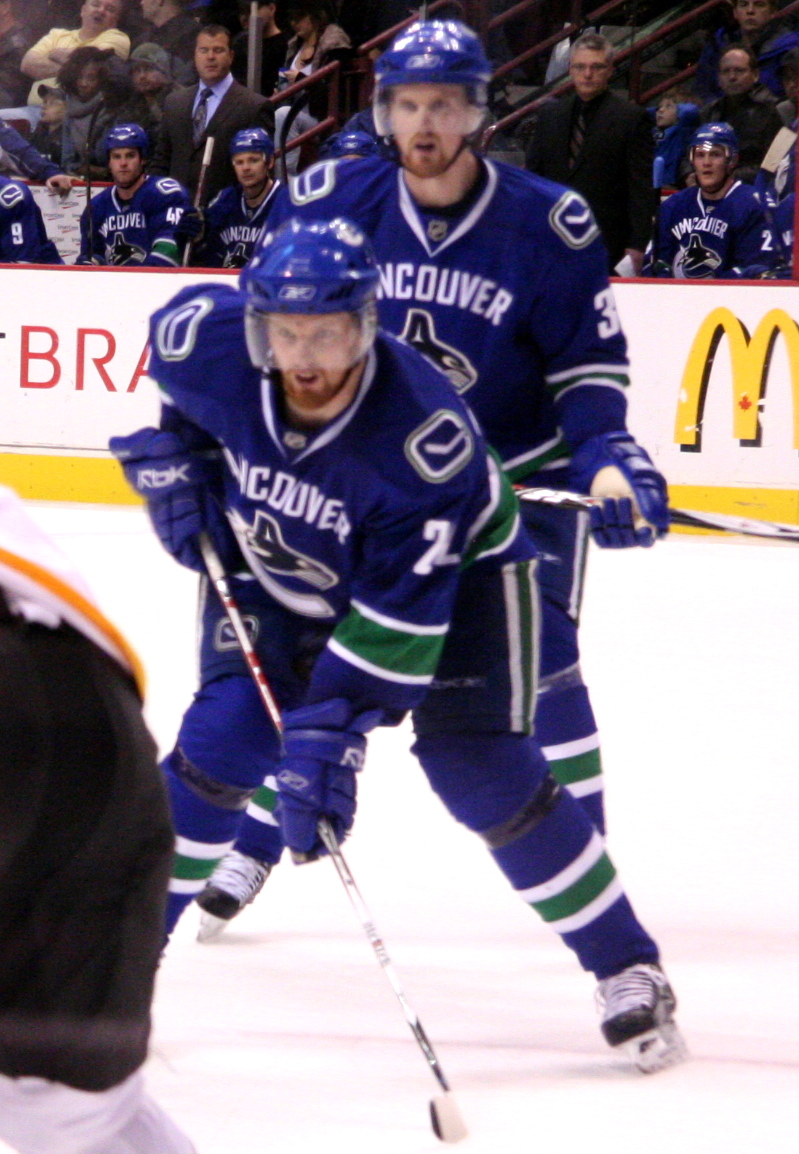
Brothers Henrik Sedin (back) and Daniel (front) combined to win the award four times

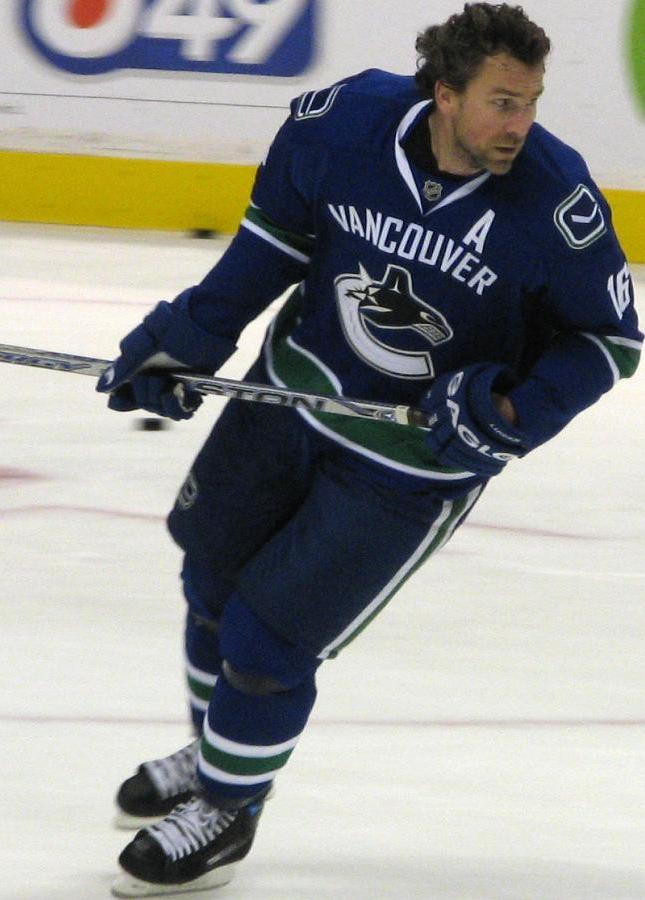
Four-time winner Trevor Linden (1989, 1991, 1995, 1996).

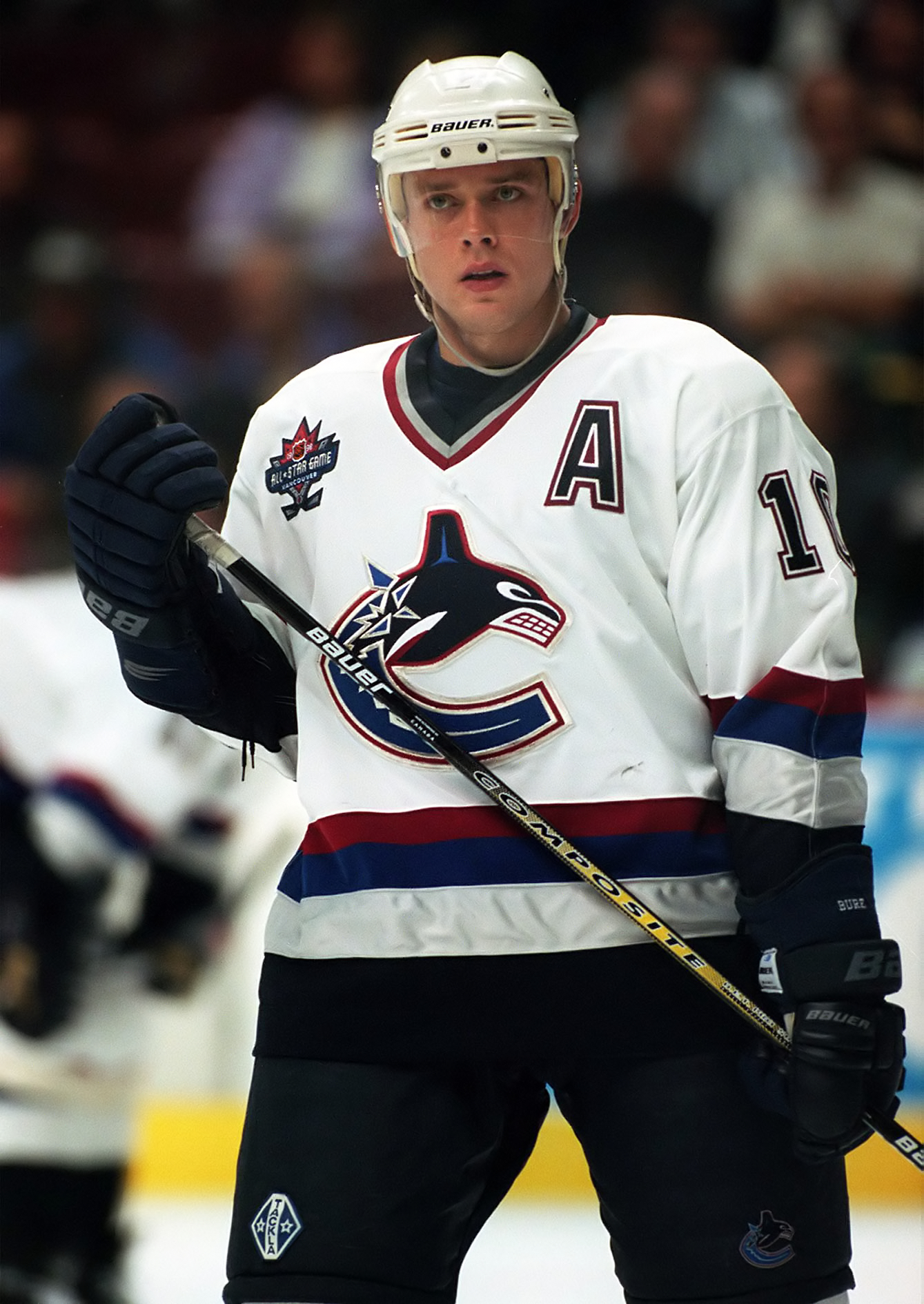
Three-time winner Pavel Bure (1993, 1994, 1998).

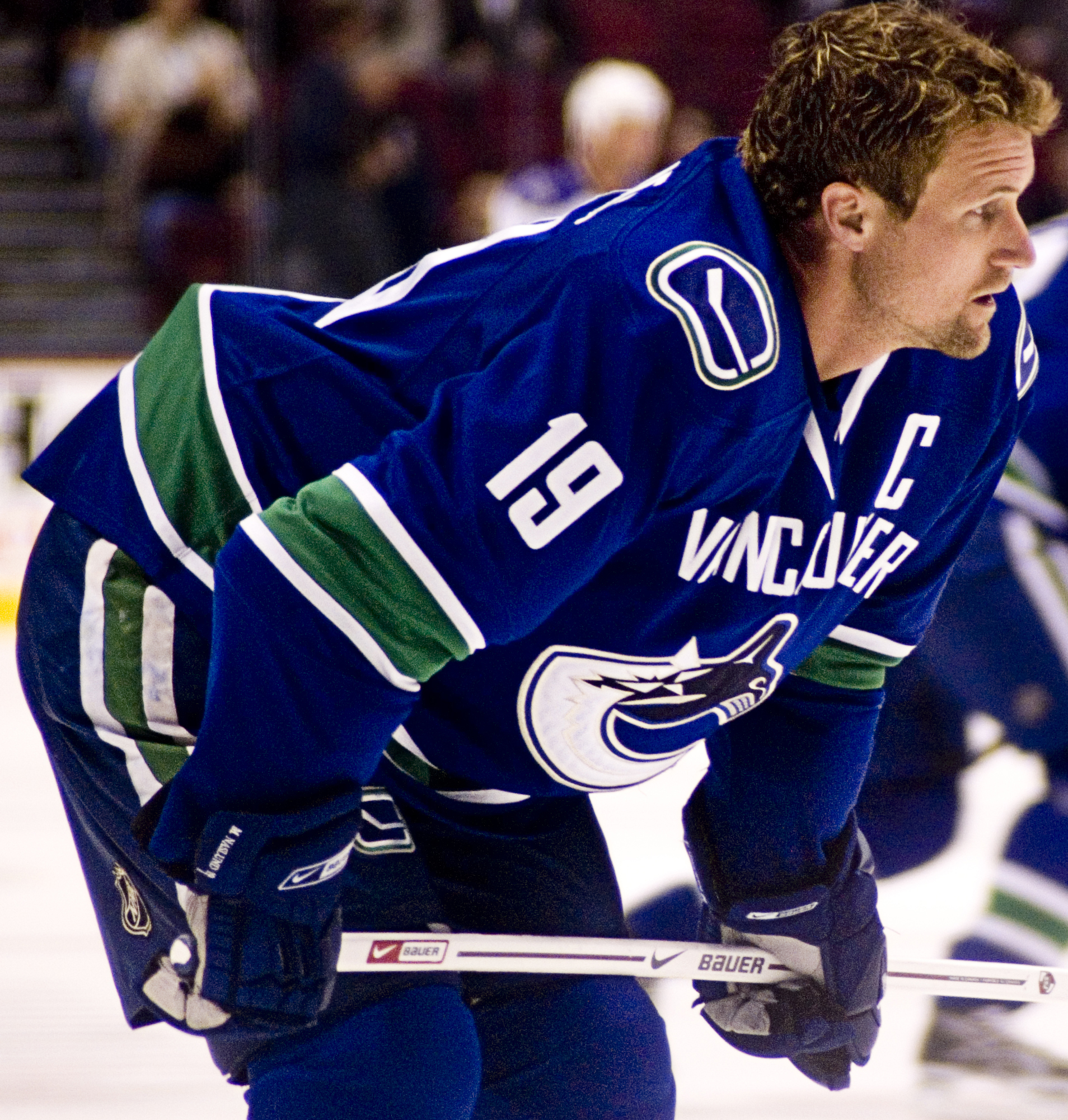
Five-time winner Markus Naslund (1999, 2001–2004).

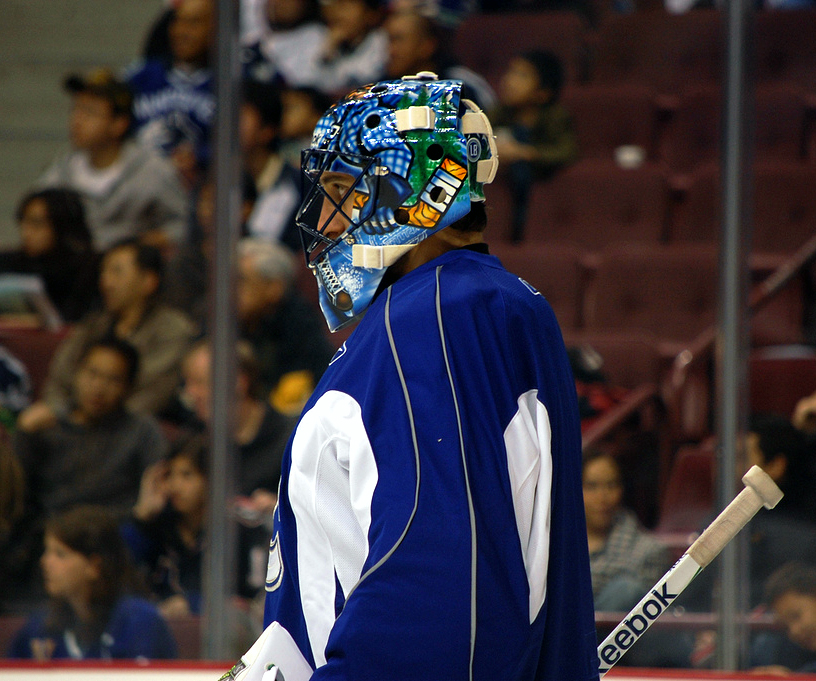
Two-time winner Roberto Luongo (2007, 2008).

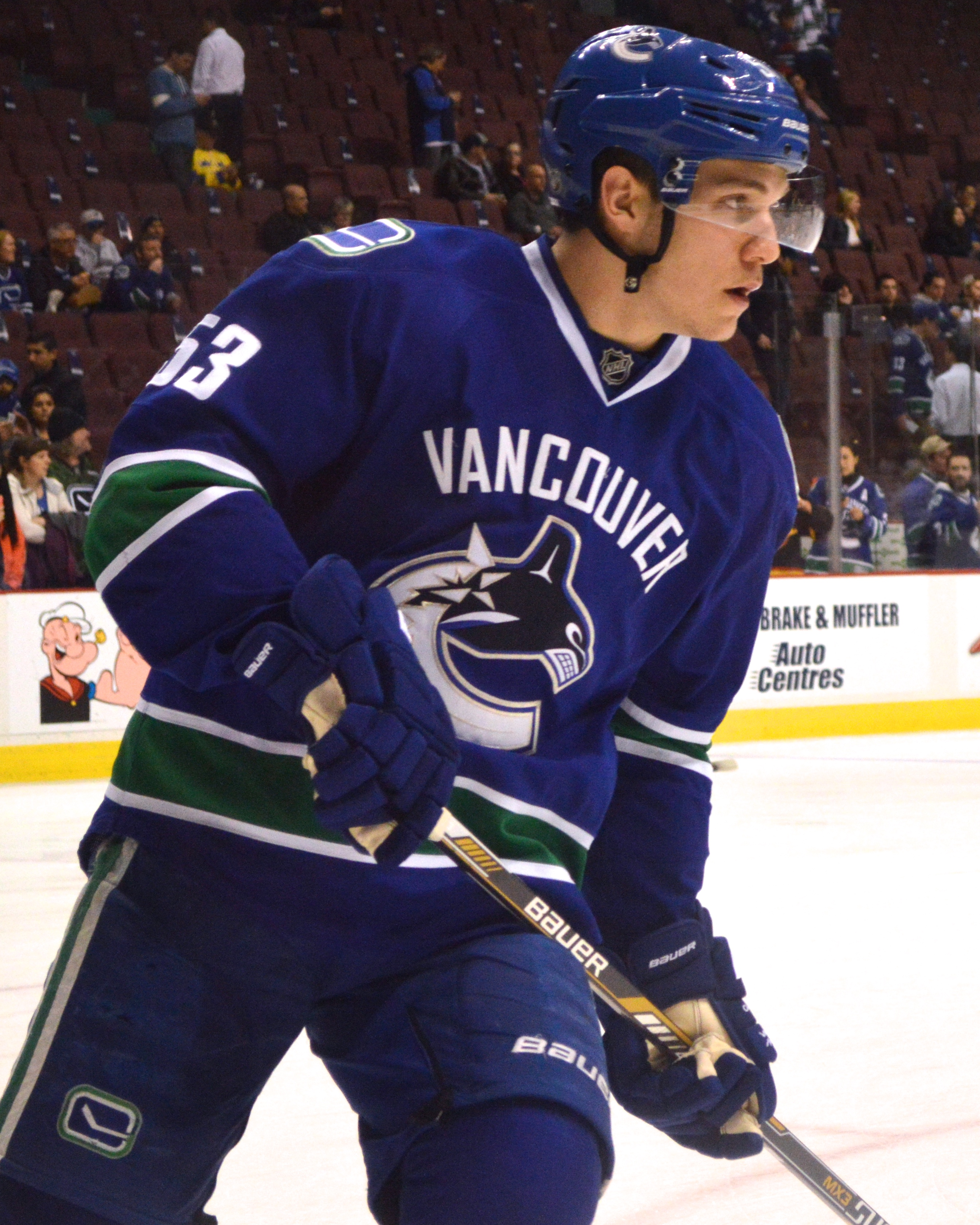
Two-time winner Bo Horvat (2017, 2021).

The Cyclone Taylor Trophy is the award given each year to the most valuable player (MVP) on the Vancouver Canucks of the National Hockey League (NHL). It is named after Cyclone Taylor, a Canadian professional ice hockey forward who led the Vancouver Millionaires to the Stanley Cup in 1915. The award was dedicated to him prior to the 1979–80 Vancouver Canucks season, the season after his death on June 9, 1979, although an award for the Canucks MVP has existed since the team's inauguration in 1970. Previously it was a Canucks MVP Award as selected by the fans while the other MVP award, the President's Trophy was selected by CP Air and later Canadian Airlines. However after the 1995–96 season, the Cyclone Taylor Trophy officially became the lone Canucks MVP award since the winners of each trophy was identical.

The most prolific winner of the Cyclone Taylor Trophy is Markus Naslund, who has been awarded five times (including four straight from 2001 to 2004), followed by Trevor Linden with four. The most recent recipient is Filip Hronek, who won it for the first time in the 2025–26 season.

== Winners ==
Positions key
C	Centre	LW	Left wing	D	Defence	RW	Right wing	G	Goaltender

Player is still active with the Canucks

Season	Winner	Position	Win #
1970–71	Orland Kurtenbach	C	1
1971–72	Orland Kurtenbach	C	2
1972–73	Orland Kurtenbach	C	3
1973–74	Gary Smith	G	1
1974–75	Gary Smith	G	2
1975–76	Don Lever	LW	1
1976–77	Cesare Maniago	G	1
1977–78	Cesare Maniago	G	2
1978–79	Thomas Gradin	C	1
1978–79	Glen Hanlon	G	1
1979–80	Stan Smyl	RW	1
1980–81	Richard Brodeur	G	1
1981–82	Richard Brodeur	G	2
1982–83	Stan Smyl	RW	2
1983–84	Patrik Sundstrom	C	1
1984–85	Richard Brodeur	G	3
1985–86	Stan Smyl	RW	3
1986–87	Barry Pederson	C	1
1987–88	Tony Tanti	LW	1
1988–89	Trevor Linden	C	1
1989–90	Kirk McLean	G	1
1990–91	Trevor Linden	C	2
1991–92	Kirk McLean	G	2
1992–93	Pavel Bure	RW	1
1993–94	Pavel Bure	RW	2
1994–95	Trevor Linden	C	3
1995–96	Trevor Linden	C	4
1996–97	Martin Gelinas	LW	1
1997–98	Pavel Bure	RW	3
1998–99	Markus Naslund	LW	1
1999–2000	Mark Messier	C	1
2000–01	Markus Naslund	LW	2
2001–02	Markus Naslund	LW	3
2002–03	Markus Naslund	LW	4
2003–04	Markus Naslund	LW	5
2004–05	Season cancelled due to the 2004–05 NHL lockout		
2005–06	Alex Auld	G	1
2006–07	Roberto Luongo	G	1
2007–08	Roberto Luongo	G	2
2008–09	Ryan Kesler	C	1
2009–10	Henrik Sedin	C	1
2010–11	Daniel Sedin	LW	1
2011–12	Henrik Sedin	C	2
2012–13	Cory Schneider	G	1
2013–14	Ryan Kesler	C	2
2014–15	Radim Vrbata	RW	1
2015–16	Daniel Sedin	LW	2
2016–17	Bo Horvat	C	1
2017–18	Brock Boeser	RW	1
2018–19	Jacob Markstrom	G	1
2019–20	Jacob Markstrom	G	2
2020–21	Bo Horvat	C	2
2021–22	Thatcher Demko	G	1
2022–23	Elias Pettersson	C	1
2023–24	J. T. Miller	C	1
2024–25	Quinn Hughes	D	1
2025-26	Filip Hronek	D	1

== See also ==
- Babe Pratt Trophy
- Cyrus H. McLean Trophy
- Fred J. Hume Award
- Molson Cup
- Pavel Bure Most Exciting Player Award
