= Cyrus H. McLean Trophy =

Ice hockey award

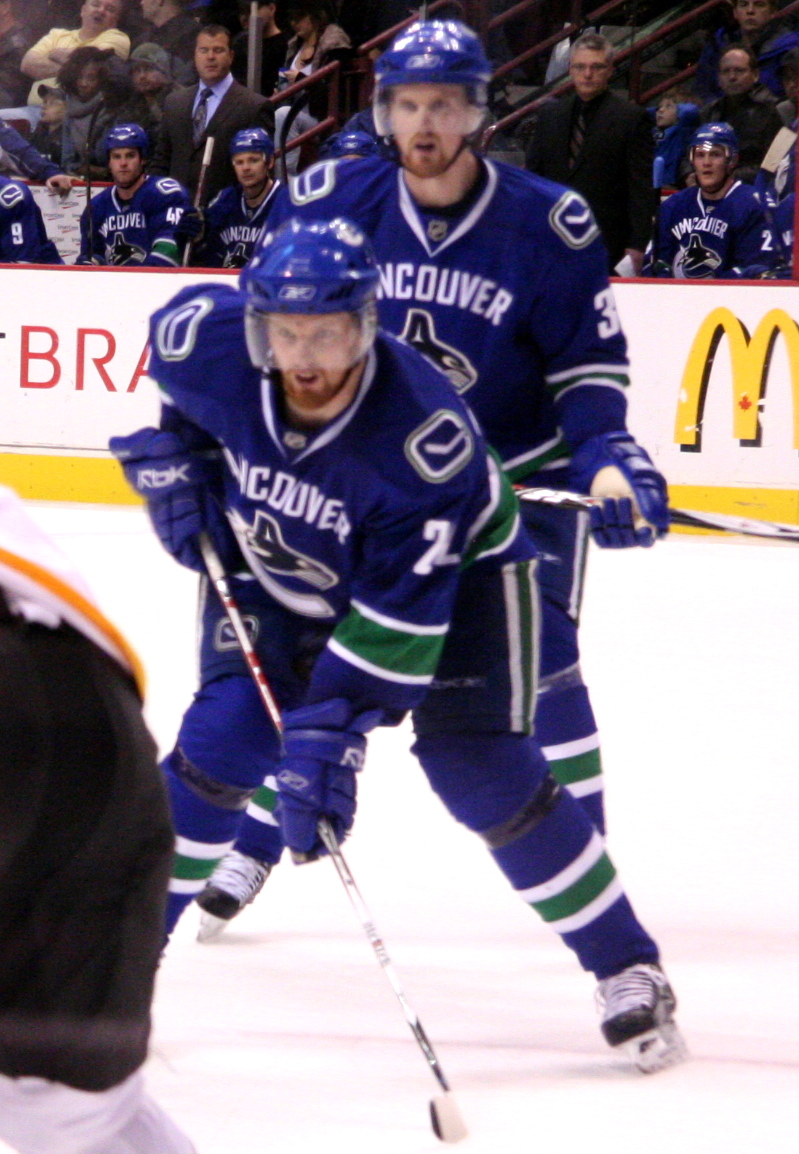
Either Daniel (front) or Henrik Sedin led the Canucks in scoring for 10 straight seasons (2007–2016).

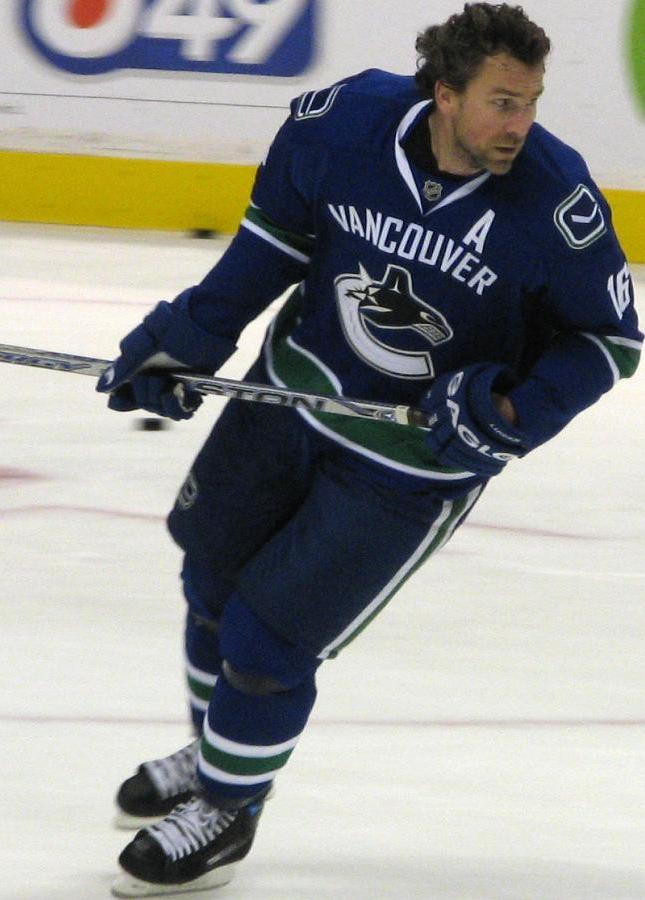
Two-time winner Trevor Linden (1991, 1992).

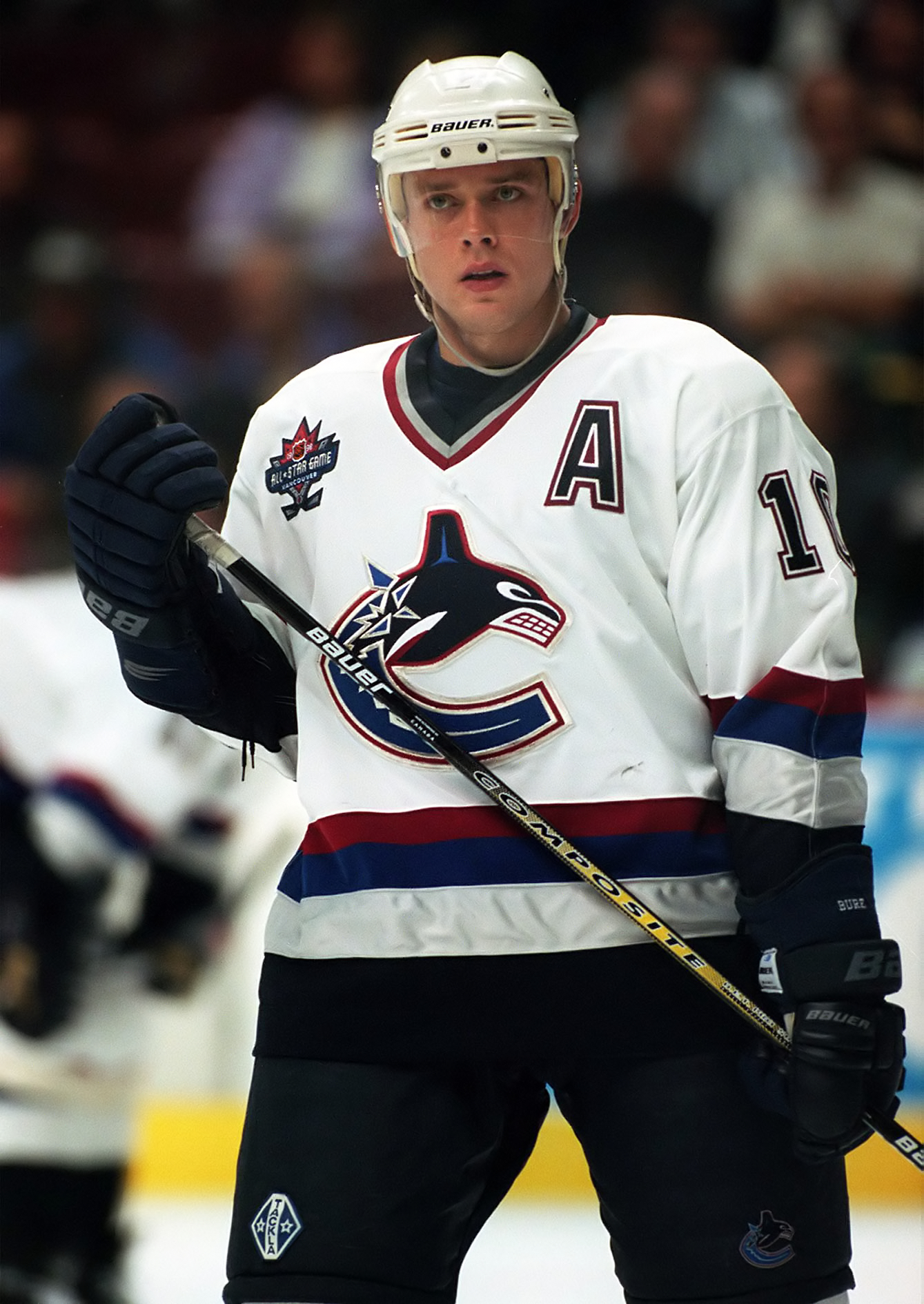
Four-time winner Pavel Bure (1993–1995, 1998).

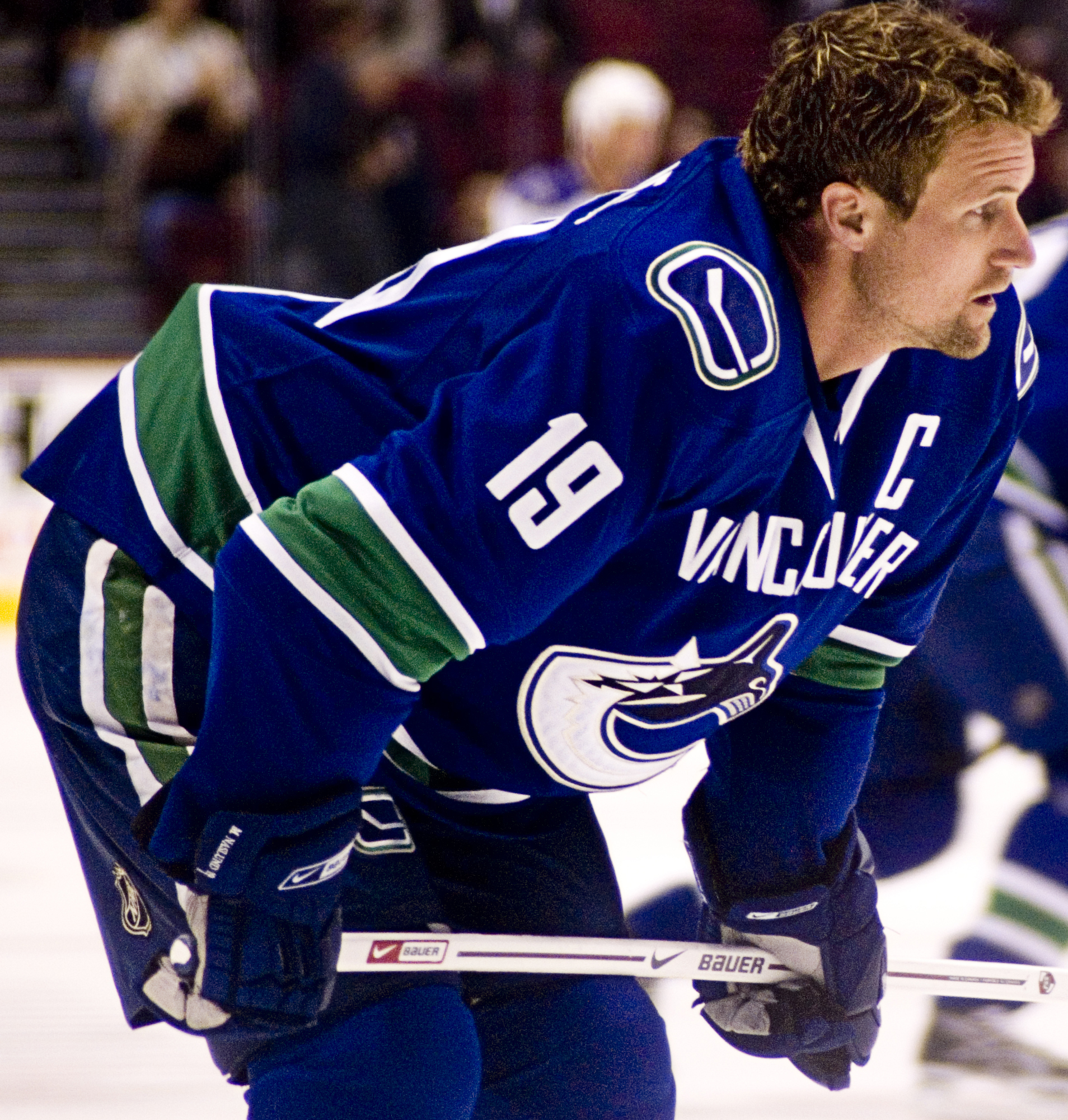
Seven-time winner Markus Naslund (1999–2004, 2006).

The Cyrus H. McLean Trophy is an award given to the annual leading point-scorer of the Vancouver Canucks of the National Hockey League (NHL). It is one of six annual team awards that are presented on the last home game of the regular season. It is named after Cyrus H. McLean who was the team president of the Vancouver Canucks from 1968 to 1970 when the team played in the Western Hockey League (WHL). The trophy was first presented in the Canucks' first NHL season in 1970–71.

Unlike the NHL's Art Ross Trophy, there is no tiebreaker in the event of a tie in points. The players would simply share the award, which has occurred on three occasions (1971–72, 2008–09 and 2017–18).

Markus Naslund has won the award the most times, leading the Canucks in scoring seven consecutive years, from 1999 to 2006. Of all the winners in the history of the trophy, six-time recipient Henrik Sedin recorded the most prolific season with 112 points in 2009–10, eclipsing four-time winner Pavel Bure's 110-point mark from 1992–93. In the 12 seasons from 2006–07 to 2017–18, the trophy has been retained by the Sedin twins in all but one season, with Henrik leading scoring in 2007–08, 2009–10, 2011–12, 2012–13 and 2013–14, while his brother Daniel has won in 2006–07, 2010–11, 2014–15, 2015–16, and 2017–18. In 2008–09, they tied for the team lead in point-scoring (though Daniel had more goals).

Elias Pettersson is the youngest player to win the award at 20 years and 145 days in 2018–19, while Daniel Sedin is the oldest at 37 years and 193 days in 2017–18. Both ages are counted as of each players' last games played of their respective award-winning seasons.

The only defencemen to win the award is Quinn Hughes in 2024–25. One other defenceman, Paul Reinhart, led the team in points with 57 in 1989–90, but the award was given to Dan Quinn who recorded 29 of his 63 points that season while a member of the Pittsburgh Penguins.

== Winners ==
Positions key
| C | Centre | D | Defence | LW | Left wing | RW | Right wing | G | Goaltender |

Player is still active with the Canucks

| Season | Winner | Goals | Assists | Points |
|---|---|---|---|---|
| 1970–71 | Andre Boudrias | 25 | 41 | 66 |
| 1971–72 | Andre Boudrias | 27 | 34 | 61 |
| 1971–72 | Orland Kurtenbach | 24 | 37 | 61 |
| 1972–73 | Bobby Schmautz | 38 | 33 | 71 |
| 1973–74 | Andre Boudrias | 16 | 59 | 75 |
| 1974–75 | Andre Boudrias | 16 | 62 | 78 |
| 1975–76 | Dennis Ververgaert | 37 | 34 | 71 |
| 1976–77 | Rick Blight | 28 | 40 | 68 |
| 1977–78 | Mike Walton | 29 | 37 | 66 |
| 1978–79 | Ron Sedlbauer | 40 | 16 | 56 |
| 1979–80 | Stan Smyl | 31 | 47 | 78 |
| 1980–81 | Thomas Gradin | 21 | 48 | 69 |
| 1981–82 | Thomas Gradin | 37 | 49 | 86 |
| 1982–83 | Stan Smyl | 38 | 50 | 88 |
| 1983–84 | Patrik Sundstrom | 38 | 53 | 91 |
| 1984–85 | Patrik Sundstrom | 25 | 43 | 68 |
| 1985–86 | Petri Skriko | 38 | 40 | 78 |
| 1986–87 | Tony Tanti | 41 | 38 | 79 |
| 1987–88 | Tony Tanti | 40 | 37 | 77 |
| 1988–89 | Petri Skriko | 30 | 36 | 66 |
| 1989–90 | Dan Quinn | 25 | 38 | 63 |
| 1990–91 | Trevor Linden | 33 | 37 | 70 |
| 1991–92 | Trevor Linden | 31 | 44 | 75 |
| 1992–93 | Pavel Bure | 60 | 50 | 110 |
| 1993–94 | Pavel Bure | 60 | 47 | 107 |
| 1994–95 | Pavel Bure | 20 | 23 | 43 |
| 1995–96 | Alexander Mogilny | 55 | 52 | 107 |
| 1996–97 | Alexander Mogilny | 31 | 42 | 73 |
| 1997–98 | Pavel Bure | 51 | 39 | 90 |
| 1998–99 | Markus Naslund | 36 | 30 | 66 |
| 1999–2000 | Markus Naslund | 27 | 38 | 65 |
| 2000–01 | Markus Naslund | 41 | 34 | 75 |
| 2001–02 | Markus Naslund | 40 | 50 | 90 |
| 2002–03 | Markus Naslund | 48 | 56 | 104 |
| 2003–04 | Markus Naslund | 35 | 49 | 85 |
| 2004–05 | Season cancelled due to the 2004–05 NHL lockout | | | |
| 2005–06 | Markus Naslund | 32 | 47 | 79 |
| 2006–07 | Daniel Sedin | 36 | 48 | 84 |
| 2007–08 | Henrik Sedin | 15 | 61 | 76 |
| 2008–09 | Daniel Sedin | 31 | 51 | 82 |
| 2008–09 | Henrik Sedin | 22 | 60 | 82 |
| 2009–10 | Henrik Sedin | 29 | 83 | 112 |
| 2010–11 | Daniel Sedin | 41 | 63 | 104 |
| 2011–12 | Henrik Sedin | 14 | 67 | 81 |
| 2012–13 | Henrik Sedin | 11 | 34 | 45 |
| 2013–14 | Henrik Sedin | 11 | 39 | 50 |
| 2014–15 | Daniel Sedin | 20 | 56 | 76 |
| 2015–16 | Daniel Sedin | 28 | 33 | 61 |
| 2016–17 | Bo Horvat | 20 | 32 | 52 |
| 2017–18 | Brock Boeser | 29 | 26 | 55 |
| 2017–18 | Daniel Sedin | 23 | 32 | 55 |
| 2018–19 | Elias Pettersson | 28 | 38 | 66 |
| 2019–20 | J. T. Miller | 27 | 45 | 72 |
| 2020–21 | Brock Boeser | 23 | 26 | 49 |
| 2021–22 | J. T. Miller | 32 | 67 | 99 |
| 2022–23 | Elias Pettersson | 39 | 63 | 102 |
| 2023–24 | J. T. Miller | 37 | 66 | 103 |
| 2024–25 | Quinn Hughes | 16 | 60 | 76 |
| 2025–26 | Elias Pettersson | 15 | 36 | 51 |

== See also ==
- Babe Pratt Trophy
- Cyclone Taylor Trophy
- Fred J. Hume Award
- Molson Cup
- Pavel Bure Most Exciting Player Award
