= Tony Tanti =

Canadian ice hockey player

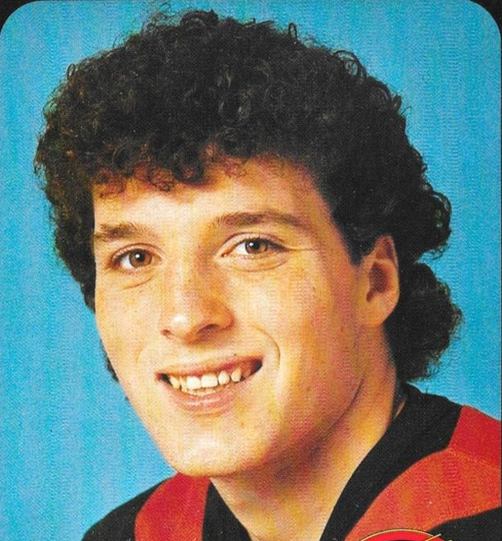
- Born: September 7, 1963 (age 62) Toronto, Ontario, Canada
- Height: 5 ft 9 in (175 cm)
- Weight: 185 lb (84 kg; 13 st 3 lb)
- Position: Winger
- Shot: Left
- Played for: Chicago Black Hawks; Vancouver Canucks; Pittsburgh Penguins; Buffalo Sabres; BSC Preussen
- National team: Canada
- NHL draft: 12th overall, 1981; Chicago Black Hawks
- Playing career: 1981–1998

Anthony Tanti (born September 7, 1963) is a Canadian former professional ice hockey player. He was a left winger and played the majority of his career in the National Hockey League (NHL) with the Vancouver Canucks. Originally selected 12th overall by the Chicago Black Hawks in the 1981 NHL entry draft, he was traded to the Canucks in January 1983. Tanti achieved the 40-goal mark on three occasions during his seven-year tenure with Vancouver. After being traded away in January 1990, he spent one-and-a-half year stints with the Pittsburgh Penguins and Buffalo Sabres, respectively. After 12 years in the NHL, Tanti went overseas to play for BSC Preussen of the German Bundesliga. He retired following the 1997–98 season. Tanti was known as a skilled, goal-scoring forward and has been described as the first "true sniper" in Canucks history. Tanti was born in Toronto, Ontario.

== Playing career ==
After playing minor hockey with the Mississauga Reps of the Metro Toronto Hockey League, Tanti began his junior career with the B-level St. Michael's Buzzers; he scored 58 points over 37 games. The following season, Tanti moved up to the major junior level with the Oshawa Generals of the Ontario Hockey League (OHL). Recording 81 goals in his first OHL season, he broke the league's rookie goal-scoring record previously set by Wayne Gretzky (70 goals in 1977–78). He added 69 assists for 150 points over 67 games. In the playoffs, he recorded 15 points over 11 games. The local media called him The Maltese Falcon due to his heritage.

During the off-season, he was selected by the Chicago Black Hawks as the 12th overall pick in the 1981 NHL entry draft. He made his NHL debut with the Black Hawks in 1981–82, appearing in two games (no points), but spent the majority of the season back in the junior level with the Generals. Playing in 57 OHL games, he recorded 62 goals and 126 points. The following season, he registered 34 goals and 62 points through 30 OHL games. At the NHL level, he had played one contest with Chicago before being traded to the Vancouver Canucks on January 6, 1983. He was sent to Vancouver in exchange for forward Curt Fraser, a noted fighter also capable of scoring.

Tanti joined a Canucks team that had competed in the Stanley Cup Final the previous year (they lost to the New York Islanders). They failed to match that level of success during Tanti's tenure with the team and struggled to qualify for the playoffs yearly. Following the trade, Tanti immediately became a full-time NHLer and recorded 8 goals and 16 points over 39 games as a rookie. In his first full season as a Canuck (1983–84), he was chosen to the 1984 NHL All-Star Game, but was unable to play due to injury. Tanti went on to set a Canucks record with 45 goals, surpassing Darcy Rota's total of 42 from the previous season. Adding 41 assists for a career-high 86 points, he finished second in team scoring to linemate Patrik Sundstrom. The season also marked his first of five consecutive years leading the team in goal-scoring. He was also chosen as the fan-voted Most Exciting Player each year of that span.

Tanti's record-setting season was followed by 39 goals and 59 points over 68 games in 1984–85. He recorded a second consecutive 39 goals in 1985–86, a season in which he earned his second NHL All-Star Game selection. He played in the exhibition contest on a line with Denis Savard and Mark Messier and scored the first goal of the event. The following season, Tanti recorded 79 points (41 goals and 38 assists) over 77 games, earning the Cyrus H. McLean Trophy as the Canucks' leading scorer for the first time. He repeated the feat in 1987–88 with 40 goals and 77 points over 73 games, while also being awarded the Cyclone Taylor Trophy as team MVP.

Tanti's production decreased significantly in 1988–89 with 24 goals and 49 points over 77 games. Midway through the following campaign, he was dealt to the Pittsburgh Penguins in a six-player trade on January 8, 1990. Tanti left Vancouver with Rod Buskas and Barry Pederson in exchange for Dave Capuano, Andrew McBain and Dan Quinn. Over seven seasons with the Canucks, he totaled 250 goals (which ranked second among all-time Canucks scorers, 12 behind leader Stan Smyl) and 470 points (third at the time, behind Smyl and Thomas Gradin). His 10 hat tricks, 102 power play goals and 29 game-winning goals all set team records, though they have since been surpassed. (Note: His 10 hat tricks was tied by Markus Näslund; his 102 power play goals was surpassed by Näslund and Daniel Sedin; and his 29 game-winning goals was first surpassed by Pavel Bure, while the record-holder as of the 2011–12 season was Sedin.) In a 2012 article by The Province, columnist Jim Jamieson declared Tanti as the Canucks' "first true sniper" in team history.

Tanti concluded his NHL career with brief stints in Pittsburgh and Buffalo before playing for six seasons in Berlin, Germany.

== International career ==
Tony Tanti
Medal record

Representing Canada

Men's ice hockey

World Championships
Bronze medal – third place	1986 Soviet Union	
Silver medal – second place	1985 Czechoslovakia	

Internationally, Tanti played for Canada at the 1983 World Junior Championships and at the World Championships in 1985, 1986, and 1987. He was invited to the training camp for the 1987 Canada Cup, but failed to make the team.

== Personal life ==
During his tenure with the Vancouver Canucks, Tanti met his wife, Christina, who was a local. They have two children, son Taylor (who also plays hockey competitively) and daughter Tessa. Following his retirement from playing, Tanti returned to live in the West Vancouver neighbourhood and entered the flooring business. His company partnered with local Bosa Development (founded by Nat Bosa, who Tanti became friends with during his NHL career), among other companies to provide wholesale flooring for construction projects in Vancouver and abroad.

In his spare time, Tanti coaches youth hockey alongside another former Canuck Dave Babych. He also participates occasionally with the Canucks' alumni organization.

Tanti is of Maltese heritage, with his parents both having been born in Hamrun, Malta. During his playing career, he had the nickname the Maltese Falcon.

== Career statistics ==
=== Regular season and playoffs ===
			Regular season					Playoffs
Season	Team	League	GP	G	A	Pts	PIM	GP	G	A	Pts	PIM
1979–80	St. Michael's Buzzers	MetJHL	37	31	27	58	67	—	—	—	—	—
1980–81	Oshawa Generals	OHL	67	81	69	150	197	11	7	8	15	41
1981–82	Chicago Black Hawks	NHL	2	0	0	0	0	—	—	—	—	—
1981–82	Oshawa Generals	OHL	57	62	64	126	138	12	14	12	26	15
1982–83	Chicago Black Hawks	NHL	1	1	0	1	0	—	—	—	—	—
1982–83	Oshawa Generals	OHL	30	34	28	62	35	—	—	—	—	—
1982–83	Vancouver Canucks	NHL	39	8	8	16	16	4	0	1	1	0
1983–84	Vancouver Canucks	NHL	79	45	41	86	50	4	1	2	3	0
1984–85	Vancouver Canucks	NHL	68	39	20	59	45	—	—	—	—	—
1985–86	Vancouver Canucks	NHL	77	39	20	59	45	3	0	1	1	11
1986–87	Vancouver Canucks	NHL	77	41	38	79	84	—	—	—	—	—
1987–88	Vancouver Canucks	NHL	73	40	37	77	90	—	—	—	—	—
1988–89	Vancouver Canucks	NHL	77	24	25	49	69	7	0	5	5	4
1989–90	Vancouver Canucks	NHL	41	14	18	32	50	—	—	—	—	—
1989–90	Pittsburgh Penguins	NHL	37	14	18	32	22	—	—	—	—	—
1990–91	Pittsburgh Penguins	NHL	46	6	12	18	44	—	—	—	—	—
1990–91	Buffalo Sabres	NHL	10	1	7	8	6	5	2	0	2	8
1991–92	Buffalo Sabres	NHL	70	15	16	31	100	7	0	3	3	4
1992–93	BSC Preussen	1.GBun	34	14	17	31	73	—	—	—	—	—
1993–94	BSC Preussen	1.GBun	41	13	19	32	44	—	—	—	—	—
1994–95	BSC Preussen	DEL	42	25	33	58	114	9	2	2	4	8
1995–96	Preussen Devils	DEL	43	32	28	60	56	11	9	5	14	16
1996–97	Berlin Capitals	DEL	44	14	25	39	42	4	0	2	2	6
1997–98	Berlin Capitals	DEL	39	8	23	31	64	4	0	1	1	20
NHL totals			697	287	273	560	661	30	3	12	15	27
DEL totals			168	79	109	188	276	28	11	10	21	50

=== International ===
Year	Team	Event	GP	G	A	Pts	PIM
1983	Canada	WJC	7	0	4	4	0
1985	Canada	WC	10	5	2	7	12
1986	Canada	WC	8	5	3	8	22
1987	Canada	WC	10	6	2	8	6
Senior totals			28	16	7	23	40

=== All-Star Games ===
Year	Location	G	A	P
1984	East Rutherford	—	—	—
1986	Hartford	1	0	1
All-Star totals		1	0	1

== Awards and achievements ==
- NHL All-Star Game – 1984, 1986
- Most Exciting Player Award (Vancouver Canucks) – 1984, 1985, 1986, 1987, 1988
- Cyrus H. McLean Trophy (Vancouver Canucks' leading scorer) – 1987, 1988
- Cyclone Taylor Trophy (Vancouver Canucks MVP) – 1988
- Number 22 retired by the Oshawa Generals

== Records ==
- Ontario Hockey League rookie goal-scoring record – 81 (1980–81)
- Vancouver Canucks all-time hat tricks record – 10 (tied with Markus Näslund)

== Notes ==
Awards and achievements
Preceded by Denis Savard	Chicago Blackhawks first-round draft pick 1981	Succeeded by Ken Yaremchuk
