= Bobby Lalonde =

Canadian ice hockey player (born 1951)

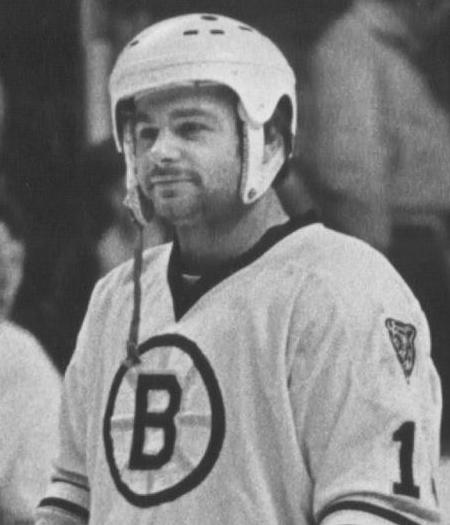
- Born: March 27, 1951 (age 75) Montreal, Quebec, Canada
- Height: 5 ft 5 in (165 cm)
- Weight: 155 lb (70 kg; 11 st 1 lb)
- Position: Centre
- Shot: Left
- Played for: Vancouver Canucks; Atlanta Flames; Boston Bruins; Calgary Flames; HC Davos
- NHL draft: 17th overall, 1971; Vancouver Canucks
- Playing career: 1971–1982

Robert Patrick Lalonde (born March 27, 1951) is a Canadian former professional ice hockey player who played 641 games in the National Hockey League from 1971 to 1982. During his career he accumulated 124 goals, 210 assists for a total of 334 points. He played for the Vancouver Canucks, Atlanta Flames, Boston Bruins, and a short stint with the Calgary Flames until his eventual retirement due to a recurring knee injury. Bobby Lalonde was listed at 5'5" and was the shortest player to play in the NHL at that time. He was selected 17th overall in the second round of the 1971 NHL entry draft.

He now resides on the outskirts of Toronto, Ontario, with his wife Carolyn. He has two sons. Brent, the eldest, was born while he was playing for the Vancouver Canucks and his younger son Court was born while he was playing for the Atlanta Flames.

== Playing career ==
Lalonde played in the 1962 Quebec International Pee-Wee Hockey Tournament with the LaSalle youth team. His junior career began with the Ontario Hockey Association's Montreal Junior Canadiens, for whom he played from 1968 to 1971, earning 255 points in combined goals and assists. The Junior Canadiens won the Memorial Cup twice during Lalonde's tenure there, once in 1969 and again the following year.

Lalonde turned pro in 1971, joining the National Hockey League's Vancouver Canucks as their second round draft choice. He netted 1 goal and 5 assists in 27 games with the Canucks prior to being sent to their American Hockey League affiliate Rochester Americans for the remainder of the season. Lalonde skated with the Americans for 42 games, tallying 25 points in goals and assists. The following season Lalonde skated with the Canucks, where he remained until 1977. He spent nearly half of the 1973–74 season out of play due to an ankle injury. During the 1975–76 and 1976–77 seasons, Lalonde briefly played for the Central Hockey League's Tulsa Oilers. All told, Lalonde netted 189 points in combined goals and assists in 353 games with the Canucks.

In October 1977, Lalonde (then a free agent) was picked up by the Atlanta Flames. Lalonde remained with the Flames through 1979, scoring 38 goals and 56 assists in 154 games.

Lalonde was traded to the Boston Bruins in exchange for future considerations in October 1979. He found himself playing for Fred Creighton, who had coached him previously in Atlanta. He spent the bulk of the 1979–80 and 1980–81 seasons in Boston, tallying 14 goals and 37 assists in 133 games.

In October 1981, the Bruins bought out the remaining year of Lalonde's contract and released him as a free agent. Lalonde returned to the NHL on a minor-league contract with the Calgary Flames, playing 19 games with the CHL's Oklahoma City Stars and 1 game with the Flames. He then moved to the European leagues, playing 15 games with HC Davos of the Swiss National League A before retiring from professional hockey in 1982.

== Career statistics ==
=== Regular season and playoffs ===
			Regular season					Playoffs
Season	Team	League	GP	G	A	Pts	PIM	GP	G	A	Pts	PIM
1968–69	Montreal Junior Canadiens	OHA	54	17	27	44	18	13	0	5	5	0
1968–69	Montreal Junior Canadiens	M-Cup	—	—	—	—	—	8	4	4	8	17
1969–70	Montreal Junior Canadiens	OHA	54	42	42	84	73	16	6	10	16	17
1969–70	Montreal Junior Canadiens	M-Cup	—	—	—	—	—	12	6	19	25	19
1970–71	Montreal Junior Canadiens	OHA	61	59	68	127	71	11	8	13	21	35
1971–72	Rochester Americans	AHL	42	14	11	25	19	—	—	—	—	—
1971–72	Vancouver Canucks	NHL	27	1	5	6	2	—	—	—	—	—
1972–73	Vancouver Canucks	NHL	77	20	27	47	32	—	—	—	—	—
1973–74	Vancouver Canucks	NHL	36	3	4	7	18	—	—	—	—	—
1974–75	Vancouver Canucks	NHL	74	17	30	47	48	5	0	0	0	0
1975–76	Vancouver Canucks	NHL	71	14	36	50	46	1	0	0	0	2
1975–76	Tulsa Oilers	CHL	4	3	2	5	2	—	—	—	—	—
1976–77	Vancouver Canucks	NHL	68	17	15	32	39	—	—	—	—	—
1976–77	Tulsa Oilers	CHL	7	2	2	4	0	—	—	—	—	—
1977–78	Atlanta Flames	NHL	73	14	23	37	28	1	1	0	1	0
1978–79	Atlanta Flames	NHL	78	24	32	56	24	2	1	0	1	0
1979–80	Atlanta Flames	NHL	3	0	1	1	2	—	—	—	—	—
1979–80	Boston Bruins	NHL	71	10	25	35	28	4	0	1	1	2
1980–81	Boston Bruins	NHL	62	4	12	16	31	3	2	1	3	2
1981–82	Calgary Flames	NHL	1	0	0	0	0	—	—	—	—	—
1981–82	Oklahoma City Stars	CHL	19	6	11	17	36	—	—	—	—	—
1981–82	HC Davos	NLA	15	8	21	29	—	12	13	13	26
NHL totals			641	124	210	334	298	16	4	2	6	6
