= Trevor Linden =

Canadian ice hockey player (born 1970)

CM OBC Trevor Linden
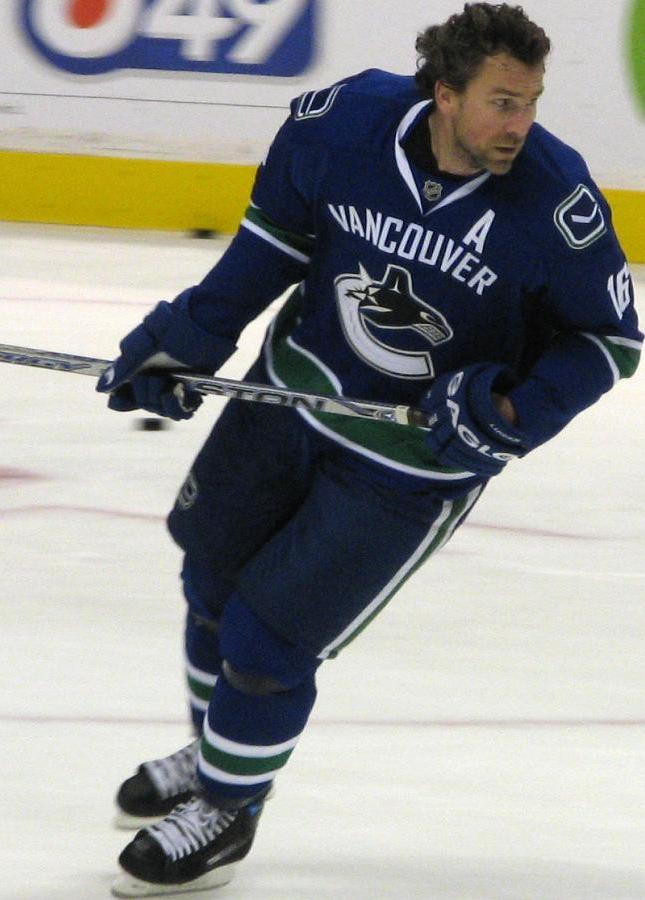
- Linden with the Vancouver Canucks in 2008
- Born: April 11, 1970 (age 56) Medicine Hat, Alberta, Canada
- Height: 6 ft 4 in (193 cm)
- Weight: 220 lb (100 kg; 15 st 10 lb)
- Position: Centre / Right wing
- Shot: Right
- Played for: Vancouver Canucks; New York Islanders; Montreal Canadiens; Washington Capitals
- National team: Canada
- NHL draft: 2nd overall, 1988; Vancouver Canucks
- Playing career: 1988–2008

Trevor John Linden CM OBC (born April 11, 1970) is a Canadian former professional ice hockey player and former president of hockey operations and alternate governor of the Vancouver Canucks. He spent 19 seasons in the National Hockey League (NHL), playing centre and right wing with four teams: the Vancouver Canucks (in two tenures; the first and last), New York Islanders, Montreal Canadiens and Washington Capitals. Before joining the NHL in 1988, Linden helped the Medicine Hat Tigers of the Western Hockey League (WHL) win consecutive Memorial Cup championships. In addition to appearing in two NHL All-Star Games, Linden was a member of the 1998 Canadian Olympic team and participated in the 1996 World Cup of Hockey.

Throughout his career, Linden was recognized as a respected leader on and off the ice. He was named captain of the Canucks at age 21, making him one of the youngest captains in league history. In that capacity, Linden was nicknamed "Captain Canuck" and led the team to back-to-back Smythe Division titles in 1992 and 1993, followed by a trip to the Stanley Cup Final in 1994, where they lost in seven games. In 1998, he was elected president of the National Hockey League Players' Association (NHLPA), a position he held for eight years. As President, he played an instrumental role in the 2004–05 NHL lockout, including negotiations with league owners. Off the ice, Linden has taken an active role in charities, and was awarded the King Clancy Memorial Trophy for leadership on the ice and humanitarian contributions off the ice in 1997, as well as the NHL Foundation Player Award in 2008. Linden retired on June 11, 2008, 20 years to the day after he was drafted into the NHL. Linden's jersey number 16 was retired by the Canucks on December 17, 2008, the second number retired by the team.

On April 9, 2014, Linden was named president of hockey operations for the Vancouver Canucks, a position he held until July 2018.

== Early life ==
Trevor Linden's grandfather, Nick van der Linden, emigrated to Canada from the Netherlands in 1929. He ran a construction company until his son Lane (Trevor's father) replaced him in 1979. Trevor was born on April 11, 1970, in Medicine Hat, Alberta to Lane and Edna Linden. Linden was a skilled athlete; while hockey was his top priority, he also participated in baseball, golf, volleyball, basketball and speed skating. An excellent student in school, he was recruited by Princeton University to play for their hockey team. Instead, Linden chose to stay in Medicine Hat and play with the local major junior team, the Medicine Hat Tigers of the Western Hockey League (WHL). Linden grew up watching the Tigers and idolized Lanny McDonald, who played in Medicine Hat before he joined the NHL.

After one season playing with the Medicine Hat Midget Tigers of the Alberta Midget Hockey League (AMHL), Linden joined the WHL Tigers for the final five games of the 1985–86 regular season, where he scored two goals; he also appeared in six playoff games, scoring one goal. The next season, at age 16, he made the team full-time. In his first full season in the WHL, Linden had 36 points in 72 games, and then had 9 points in 20 playoff games, including two goals in the championship game, helping Medicine Hat win their first Memorial Cup as Canadian junior champions. The next year, Linden had 110 points in 67 games and led the Tigers to their second consecutive Memorial Cup title. During the 1988 WHL playoffs, Linden set a WHL playoff record by scoring the fastest goal from the start of a game, seven seconds into a 6–5 Tigers win over the Saskatoon Blades on April 15, 1988. At the 1988 NHL entry draft, the Vancouver Canucks selected Linden second overall, after the Minnesota North Stars selected Mike Modano.

== NHL career ==
=== Vancouver Canucks (1988–1998) ===
Linden made his NHL debut on October 6, 1988, against the Winnipeg Jets, aged 18. He scored his first goal on October 18, 1988, against Kelly Hrudey of the New York Islanders and later, on November 17, he scored his first hat-trick against the Minnesota North Stars. Linden finished the season tied for the team lead in goals (30) and second for points (59). He was the first Canucks rookie to score 30 goals and came within one point of tying Ivan Hlinka's team record of 60 points as a first-year player, set in 1981–82 (the record was later tied by Pavel Bure in 1991–92). Linden also became the first rookie to win the Cyclone Taylor Award, given to the Canucks' most valuable player. He was named to the NHL All-Rookie Team, and finished second to Brian Leetch, of the New York Rangers, in voting for the Calder Memorial Trophy, awarded to the rookie of the year. Fans voted him as the winner of The Hockey News' rookie of the year award. The Canucks made the playoffs in the 1988–89 season, for the first time in three years, and Linden scored seven points in the Canucks' seven-game series loss to the eventual Stanley Cup champion Calgary Flames.

In his sophomore NHL season, Linden finished second on the team in goals (21) and points (51) and finished third in assists (30). The following year, he was one of three Canucks to share a rotating captaincy, the others being Doug Lidster and Dan Quinn. Linden led the team with 37 assists and 70 points, and made his first appearance in an NHL All-Star Game, where he was the youngest player. At age 21, he was made sole captain of the team, becoming the youngest Canucks captain. That season, Linden led the Canucks in scoring for a second straight year with 75 points (31 goals and 44 assists), leading the Canucks to their first division title since the 1974–75 season.

A natural winger early in his career, Linden began learning to play at the centre position during the Canucks training camp in October 1992. Canucks head coach Pat Quinn initiated the switch in response to the losses of centres Anatoli Semenov and Petr Nedvěd during the off-season. The Canucks repeated as Smythe Division champions that year, setting franchise records for wins and points with 46 and 101 respectively. (Note: The wins record was surpassed in 2006–07 by three, while the points record was broken in 2002–03 by three.) For the third-straight season, Linden surpassed 30 goals and 70 points, finishing with 33 goals and 72 points.

In the 1993–94 season, Linden scored 32 goals, the fifth time in six seasons he had scored at least 30, but his points total fell to 61 as the Canucks finished 12 points behind the division leader. Although they were the seventh seed in the playoffs, the Canucks reached the Stanley Cup Final for the first time in 12 years and second time in team history. Considered the underdogs against the Presidents' Trophy-winning New York Rangers captained by Mark Messier, the Canucks initially fell behind three games to one but pushed the series to seven games. In game seven, Linden scored twice (the next player to get two goals in a game seven was Alex Tanguay in 2001), but the Canucks lost 3–2. Linden finished second on the team in playoff scoring, with 12 goals and 25 points. It was revealed afterwards that Linden had played through the finals with broken ribs and torn rib cartilage.

In the 1995–96 season, Linden had 33 goals, 47 assists and 80 points, the most he has ever collected in all three statistical categories. On February 27, 1996, he played in his 437th consecutive game, breaking the team record previously held by Don Lever. The following season marked the end of Linden's ironman streak; between October 4, 1990, and December 3, 1996, he appeared in 482 consecutive games, the longest in the league at the time. His team record was later broken in 2007 by Brendan Morrison. In his 49 games that season, he scored 9 goals and 31 assists. At the conclusion of the season, the NHL recognized Linden's contributions to the Vancouver community and awarded him the King Clancy Memorial Trophy.

At the start of the 1997–98 season, the Canucks added free agent Mark Messier, a six-time Stanley Cup winner, and manager/head coach Mike Keenan, who were, respectively, captain and head coach of the New York Rangers when they defeated Vancouver in the 1994 Stanley Cup Final. Keenan's hiring was as a result of Pat Quinn being dismissed as general manager, and Keenan also assumed the title of bench boss by firing head coach Tom Renney early in the season. According to some accounts, Linden initially gave up the team captaincy to Messier out of respect, but later regretted the move as he felt Messier's invasion of the dressing room was hostile. Friction developed between Linden and Keenan early in the season. As the relationship worsened, Keenan claimed that it was evident Linden would be traded. After a 5–1 loss to the St. Louis Blues, Keenan openly blamed Linden for the loss, a moment Linden refers to as his "darkest time". Playing in 42 games with the Canucks before the February Olympic break, Linden had 7 goals and 21 points.

=== New York, Montreal and Washington (1998–2001) ===
Linden was traded to the New York Islanders on February 6, 1998, in exchange for Todd Bertuzzi, Bryan McCabe and the Islanders' third-round pick (used to select Jarkko Ruutu) in the 1998 NHL entry draft. After the conclusion of the Olympics, in which he participated, Linden (who was named captain, succeeding the traded McCabe) joined the Islanders and played 25 games with the team. He scored 10 goals and 7 assists for 17 points to finish the season, with a combined 17 goals and 21 assists for 38 points in 67 games. The following year, his first full season in three years, Linden was second on the team with 47 points, and third with 18 goals. However, on May 29, 1999, the Islanders traded Linden to the Montreal Canadiens for a first-round draft pick in the 1999 NHL entry draft (used to select Branislav Mezei), mostly for financial reasons. The thrill of playing in Montreal, the "centre of hockey", was an exciting prospect to Linden after his time spent with the Islanders, where the arena was usually half-filled when he played there.

With Montreal, Linden was often injured and only appeared in 50 games during his first season, scoring 30 points. The next year, he appeared in 57 games, scoring 33 points. While with the Canadiens, he signed a four-year contract worth $15 million. However, he was traded for the third time in his career, this time to the Washington Capitals, going with Dainius Zubrus, and the New Jersey Devils' second-round draft pick in the 2001 NHL entry draft (later traded to Tampa Bay, who selected Andreas Holmqvist) in exchange for Richard Zedník, Jan Bulis and Washington's first-round pick in the 2001 Draft (used to select Alexander Perezhogin). With Washington, Linden reached the playoffs for the first time in four years, in the 2000–01 season.

=== Return to Vancouver (2001–2008) ===
After 28 games over two seasons with the Capitals, Linden had scored only four goals and three assists. On November 10, 2001, the Capitals traded Linden, along with a second-round draft pick in either 2002 or 2003 (used to select Denis Grot), to the Canucks in exchange for their first round pick in 2002 (used to select Boyd Gordon) and a third-round pick in 2003 (later traded to the Edmonton Oilers, who selected Zack Stortini). Linden scored 34 points with Vancouver in 64 games, which included his 1,000th regular season game on March 26, 2002, against the Los Angeles Kings. In his first playoff series with Vancouver in six years, he scored a goal and four assists in six games.

The 2002–03 season was Linden's first full season with the Canucks since 1996–97, though Linden sprained his knee in the season opener and had to miss two weeks. He returned in time to be honoured for his 1,000th career game, which he achieved the season before. As he did not want to distract the team from the playoff race, Linden asked for the ceremony to be delayed. On November 25, 2002, against the Minnesota Wild, Linden scored his 263rd goal with the Canucks, breaking former captain Stan Smyl's team record for most goals. He finished the year with 19 goals and 22 assists for 41 points, his highest goal total in seven seasons, and his highest points total since 1998–99.

"The career he's had, a lot of us watched him when we were younger, and the runs he's had when he first broke in. He's played for so long, and also playing against him, he's a guy that plays hard all the time. He's a leader. He's a guy that's a good, honest, hard player to play against. He's not cheap. We have a lot of respect also for what he's done for us off the ice as a group of players. I'm not sure if it's his last for sure, but if it is, it definitely was an honor to play with him."

— Jarome Iginla talking about Linden after an April 5, 2008, game, Linden's final game

The following season, Linden broke several more Canucks records. In a February 16, 2004, game against the Colorado Avalanche, he played in his 897th game as a Canuck, passing Smyl. On March 8, once again playing the Avalanche, Linden had two points, including his team-record 674th point with the Canucks, a mark also previously held by Smyl. For the first time in five years, he played in all 82 games, recording 36 points. After a year-long break from hockey during the 2004–05 NHL lockout, in which he actively participated in new collective agreement negotiations on behalf of the National Hockey League Players' Association (NHLPA), Linden again appeared in all 82 games during the 2005–06 season, scoring 7 goals and 16 points. Linden became the first player to play 1,000 games with the Canucks on April 13, 2006, when they faced the San Jose Sharks.

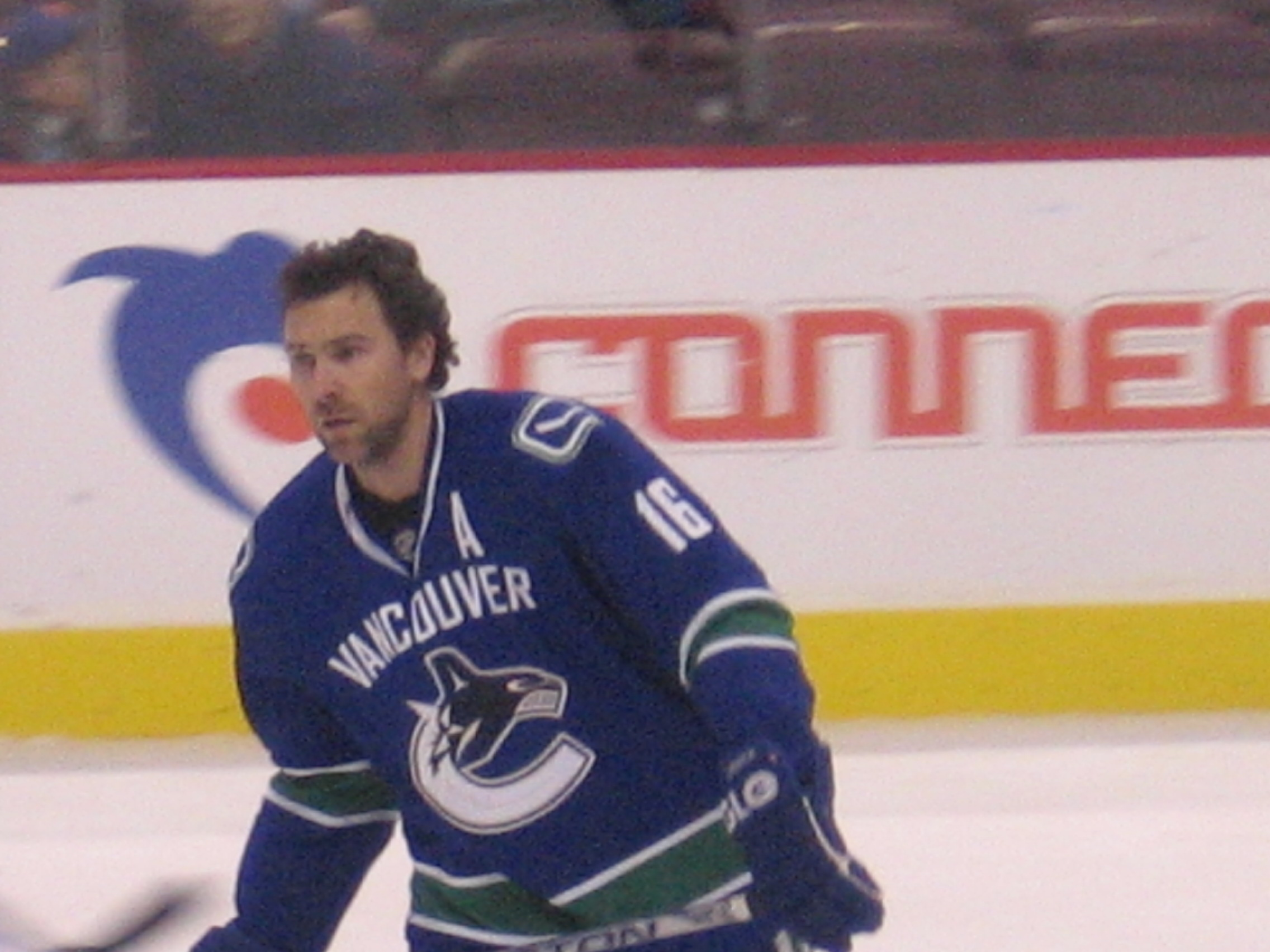
Linden during a pre-game warm-up in November 2007

In the 2006–07 season opener, on October 5, 2006, Linden scored the game winner against the Detroit Red Wings to become the first Canuck to score 300 goals with the team. After notching 25 points in 80 games, he helped the Canucks reach the second round of the playoffs. He scored two game-winning goals in the first round, including the series-winning goal against the Dallas Stars in game seven of their first-round matchup, which was Linden's sixth game seven goal of his playoff career. He finished the playoffs with a team-leading 7 points in 12 games. This made Linden the Canucks' all-time leader in playoff goals (34), assists (61) and points (95).

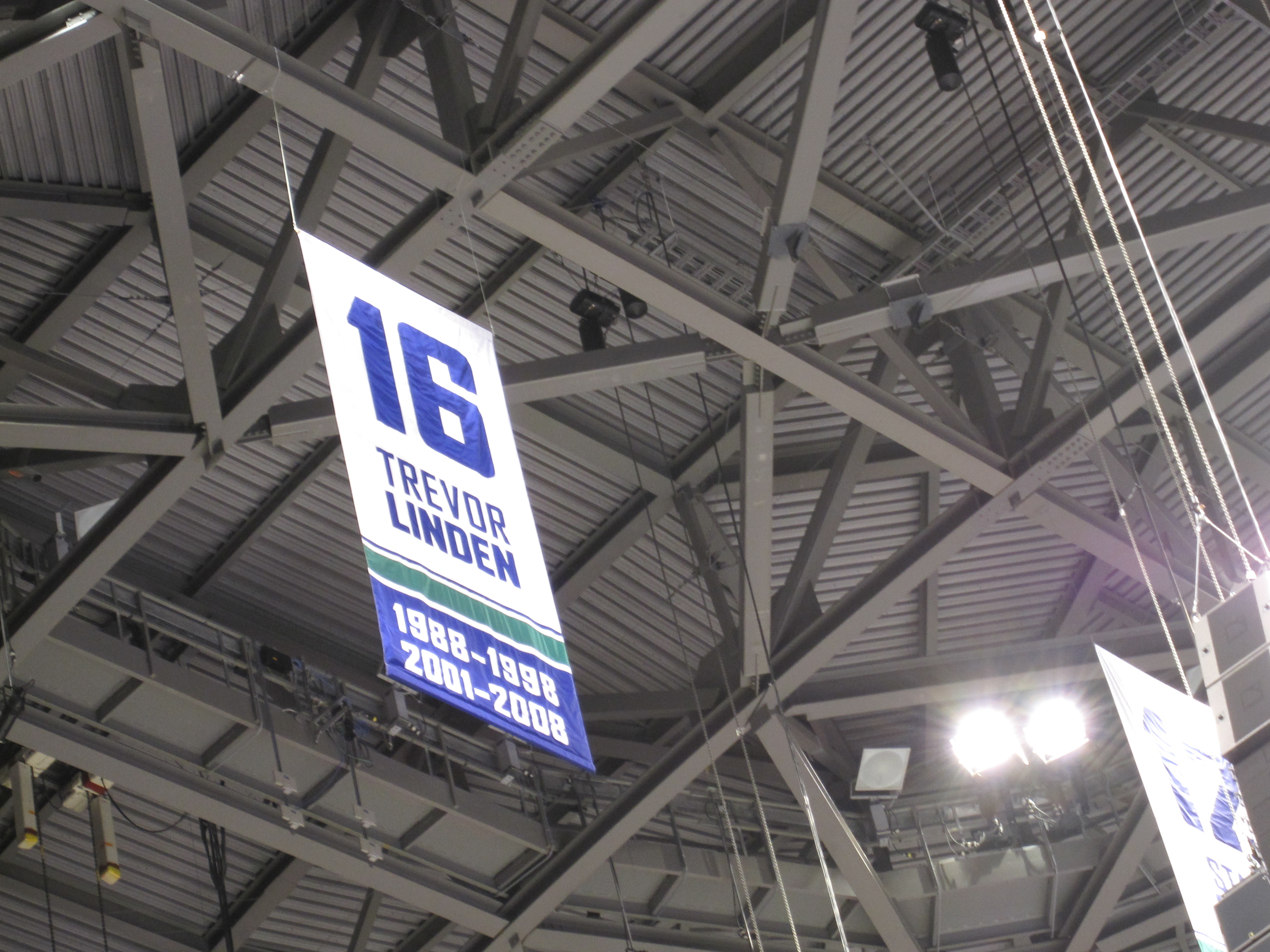
Trevor Linden's number 16, along with Stan Smyl's number 12, Markus Näslund's number 19, Pavel Bure's number 10, Daniel Sedin's number 22, and Henrik Sedin's number 33 are the only six retired jersey numbers in Vancouver Canucks history.

After taking the summer to decide if he would return for another season, Linden signed a one-year contract with the Canucks in August 2007. The season was not ideal for Linden, who was a healthy scratch 23 times. In the 59 games he played, he scored seven goals and five assists, by far the lowest totals in his career. Against the Calgary Flames on November 8, 2007, he earned his 412th assist with the Canucks, surpassing Smyl once again. He finished his career with 415 assists as a Canuck, which stood as the all-time mark until Henrik Sedin surpassed him on March 14, 2010. Linden played in the final game of his NHL career on April 5, 2008, against Calgary. Despite Vancouver losing 7–1, Linden was named the game's first star and skated a lap around GM Place to a standing ovation and received handshakes from the Calgary players.

"A guy who tried to work hard and do what's right."

— Trevor Linden, on what he wants his legacy to be

On June 11, 2008, after 19 seasons in the NHL and 20 years to the day of being drafted into the NHL by the Canucks, Linden announced his retirement, leaving as the franchise leader in games played with the Canucks (1140) and assists (415, since surpassed by Henrik Sedin), and second in goals to later captain Markus Näslund. Shortly after, Vancouver City Council stated it would honour Linden by declaring the date of his jersey retirement to be Trevor Linden Day in Vancouver.

The Canucks retired Linden's jersey number, 16, from circulation in a pre-game ceremony December 17, 2008, prior to playing the Edmonton Oilers. Linden became the second Canuck to have his jersey retired, joining former captain Stan Smyl, whose jersey number, 12, was retired in 1991. Earlier in the day, the Canucks changed the number of the entrance gate for players and VIPs from Gate 5 to Gate 16 in honour of Linden.

== Off the ice ==
=== Personal life ===
In 1995, Linden married Cristina Giusti, the owner of Basquiat, a Vancouver boutique. In 2017, the Lindens had their first child, son Roman Matthias Linden, named after Cristina's father Romano and Linden's Canuck teammate Mattias Ohlund. In 2004, Linden was baptized as a Roman Catholic.

Linden's younger brother, Jamie Linden, also played ice hockey. After a lengthy junior career in the WHL, Jamie played four games with the Florida Panthers in the 1994–95 season before finishing his hockey career in the minor leagues. Together with Trevor, Jamie is now a property developer, something they developed an interest in while growing up in Medicine Hat. Trevor had indicated that after his playing career was finished, he would like to become more involved in real estate.

Linden is also an avid and competitive cyclist, frequenting the local Squamish and Whistler area to mountain bike, in addition to participating in various races. Most significantly, in the summer of 2007, Linden competed in the Trans Alp bike race, a 600 km race across the European Alps. Linden and racing teammate John Ramsden finished 48th out of the 122 competing two-man teams over the eight-day competition.

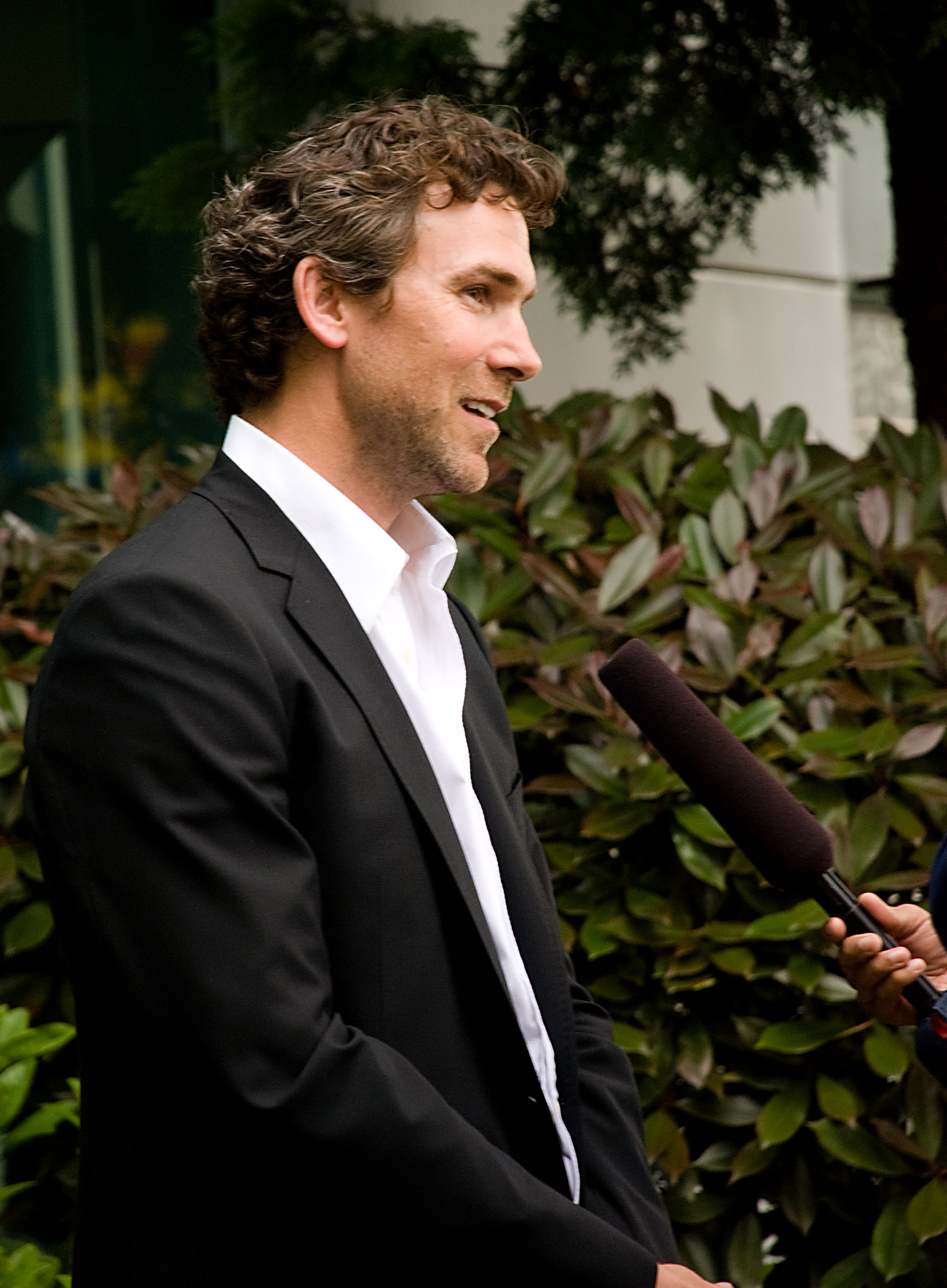
Linden being interviewed in Vancouver

Linden was involved in the creation and recent launch of Club 16 – Trevor Linden Fitness. Linden has also partnered with Vancouver developer Howard Airey, principal of Airey Development Group, to build two residential/commercial development projects. He was also the spokesperson for ClearlyContacts.ca.

=== NHLPA president ===
As a player representative to the National Hockey League Players' Association (NHLPA) since 1990, Linden was responsible for being the contact between his teammates and the NHLPA. He saw the experience as a chance to be involved in the business side of the sport. In light of this service, Linden was elected president of the NHLPA in June 1998. Consequently, Linden was actively involved in negotiations with Gary Bettman and the NHL on a new collective agreement that ended the 2004–05 lockout. This included a final meeting in January 2005 between Linden and Harley Hotchkiss, the chairman of the NHL Board of Governors, in an attempt to avoid losing the NHL season. Despite this meeting, a result was not found in time to keep the NHL from cancelling the 2004–05 season.

=== Attachment to Vancouver ===
"If somebody asked me to come up with a mental image of my hockey career, there is absolutely no doubt I would be wearing the uniform of the Vancouver Canucks in it."

— Trevor Linden

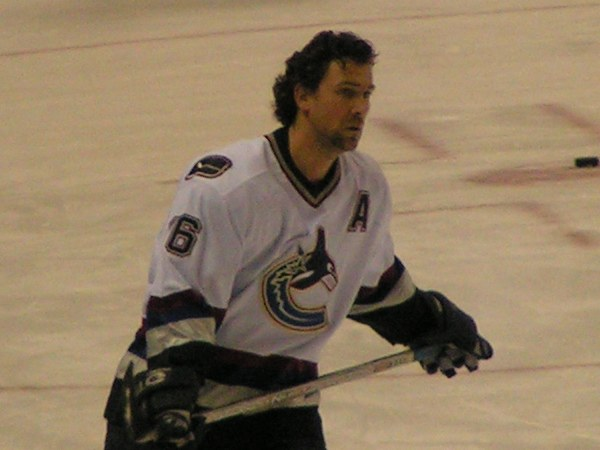
Trevor Linden with the Canucks in 2004

Linden's long tenure with the Canucks (Linden holds third most games played in franchise history at 1,140), deep attachment to the city of Vancouver and history of charitable community service and involvement have made him one of the most beloved and respected players among fans in franchise history. His 2001 return to the Canucks was an emotional event for fans and players alike, with Linden admitting he was too excited to sleep the night before his first game back. He is still often referred to affectionately as "Captain Canuck", despite not having captained the team since 1997. On April 5, 2008, the Canucks' final game of the 2007–08 season, the Vancouver crowd gave Linden a standing ovation before the start of the third period. Once the game ended, the crowd again rose to their feet in recognition of Linden.

=== Community involvement ===
In addition to hockey, Linden has also undertaken a considerable amount of charitable work. Working primarily with children, he has made frequent appearances at the BC Children's Hospital and Canuck Place, a hospice for terminally ill children. In 1995, he inaugurated the Trevor Linden Foundation to raise money for local charities and also hosts an annual golfing event as a fundraiser for BC Children's Hospital. When he was awarded the Order of British Columbia in 2003, the citation referred to him as a "hockey player and humanitarian". Linden has cited his brother, Dean, as being the inspiration for undertaking his charitable work, telling him to use his power as a hockey player.

In testament to his efforts off the ice in Vancouver, Linden has been a recipient of the King Clancy Memorial Trophy (1997) and the NHL Foundation Player Award (2008), honours awarded by the NHL to players for significant contributions in his community. Linden took part in the 2010 Winter Olympics torch relay when the flame was in Vancouver before the opening ceremony. On December 30, 2010, it was announced that Linden was to be invested as a Member of the Order of Canada. He was cited "[f]or his ongoing sportsmanship and community engagement as a respected leader both on and off the ice."

=== Management career ===
On April 9, 2014, he was named the president of hockey operations for the Canucks, replacing Mike Gillis in that role. Linden was hired by the Canucks the day after Gillis was fired, following a season where the team failed to become a playoff contender. On May 1, 2014, Linden fired head coach John Tortorella. Jim Benning, who was then serving as assistant general manager of the Boston Bruins, and a former Canuck and teammate of Linden in his playing career, was hired by Linden to replace Gillis as the Canucks' general manager on May 23. On June 23, 2014, Benning hired Willie Desjardins as the 18th head coach in Canucks history. On July 25, 2018, Linden parted ways with the Canucks organization.

== International play ==
Trevor Linden
Medal record

Representing Canada

Men's ice hockey

World Junior Championships
Gold medal – first place	1988 Soviet Union	Ice hockey

World Championships
Silver medal – second place	1991 Finland	Ice hockey

World Cup
Silver medal – second place	1996 World Cup of Hockey	Ice hockey

Throughout his hockey career, Linden appeared in five international tournaments for Team Canada. He first appeared on the world stage at the 1988 World Junior Championships, a tournament Canada won, where he scored one goal.

His first senior international tournament was the 1991 World Championship, in which he contributed one goal and four assists in ten games as Canada won the silver medal. Linden was also invited to training camp for the 1991 Canada Cup roster, but was released early.

In the 1996 World Cup, the successor to the Canada Cup, Linden helped Canada to a second-place finish with a goal and an assist over eight games.

Two years later, Linden was selected as a member of Team Canada in the 1998 Nagano Olympics. Though he injured his knee only weeks before, he played in all six games, scoring one goal. Linden collected a rebound from Eric Lindros to net a game-tying marker with 67 seconds left against the Czech Republic that sent the semi-final game to overtime, which one of only two goals conceded by star Czech goaltender Dominik Hašek in the knockout round. Neither team could score in overtime, and Hašek stopped all five Canadians in the shootout to eliminate Canada. Canada finished fourth in the tournament after losing the bronze medal match to Finland 3-2. Later that summer, he participated in the 1998 World Championships. He scored one goal and four assists as Canada finished fifth.

== Career statistics ==
=== Regular season and playoffs ===
			Regular season					Playoffs
Season	Team	League	GP	G	A	Pts	PIM	GP	G	A	Pts	PIM
1985–86	Medicine Hat Tigers	AMHL	40	14	22	36	14	—	—	—	—	—
1985–86	Medicine Hat Tigers	WHL	5	2	0	2	0	6	1	0	1	0
1986–87	Medicine Hat Tigers	WHL	72	14	22	36	59	20	5	4	9	17
1986–87	Medicine Hat Tigers	M-Cup	—	—	—	—	—	5	2	1	3	6
1987–88	Medicine Hat Tigers	WHL	67	46	64	110	76	16	13	12	25	19
1987–88	Medicine Hat Tigers	M-Cup	—	—	—	—	—	5	3	4	7	0
1988–89	Vancouver Canucks	NHL	80	30	29	59	41	7	3	4	7	8
1989–90	Vancouver Canucks	NHL	73	21	30	51	43	—	—	—	—	—
1990–91	Vancouver Canucks	NHL	80	33	37	70	65	6	0	7	7	2
1991–92	Vancouver Canucks	NHL	80	31	44	75	101	13	4	8	12	6
1992–93	Vancouver Canucks	NHL	84	33	39	72	64	12	5	8	13	16
1993–94	Vancouver Canucks	NHL	84	32	29	61	73	24	12	13	25	18
1994–95	Vancouver Canucks	NHL	48	18	22	40	40	11	2	6	8	12
1995–96	Vancouver Canucks	NHL	82	33	47	80	42	6	4	4	8	6
1996–97	Vancouver Canucks	NHL	49	9	31	40	27	—	—	—	—	—
1997–98	Vancouver Canucks	NHL	42	7	14	21	49	—	—	—	—	—
1997–98	New York Islanders	NHL	25	10	7	17	33	—	—	—	—	—
1998–99	New York Islanders	NHL	82	18	29	47	32	—	—	—	—	—
1999–00	Montreal Canadiens	NHL	50	13	17	30	34	—	—	—	—	—
2000–01	Montreal Canadiens	NHL	57	12	21	33	52	—	—	—	—	—
2000–01	Washington Capitals	NHL	12	3	1	4	8	6	0	4	4	14
2001–02	Washington Capitals	NHL	16	1	2	3	6	—	—	—	—	—
2001–02	Vancouver Canucks	NHL	64	12	22	34	65	6	1	4	5	0
2002–03	Vancouver Canucks	NHL	71	19	22	41	30	14	1	2	3	10
2003–04	Vancouver Canucks	NHL	82	14	22	36	26	7	0	0	0	6
2005–06	Vancouver Canucks	NHL	82	7	9	16	15	—	—	—	—	—
2006–07	Vancouver Canucks	NHL	80	12	13	25	34	12	2	5	7	6
2007–08	Vancouver Canucks	NHL	59	7	5	12	15	—	—	—	—	—
NHL totals			1,382	375	492	867	895	124	34	65	99	104

=== International ===
Year	Team	Event	GP	G	A	Pts	PIM
1988	Canada	WJC	7	1	0	1	0
1991	Canada	WC	10	1	4	5	4
1996	Canada	WCH	8	1	1	2	0
1998	Canada	OG	6	1	0	1	10
1998	Canada	WC	6	1	4	5	4
Senior totals			30	4	9	13	18

=== All-Star Games ===
Year	Location	G	A	P
1991	Chicago	0	0	0
1992	Philadelphia	1	1	2
All-Star totals		1	1	2

- All stats taken from NHL.com.

== Awards ==
=== Canadian honours ===
Award	Year
Order of British Columbia	2003
Order of Canada	2010

=== NHL ===
Award	Year
NHL All-Rookie Team	1989
King Clancy Memorial Trophy	1997
NHL Foundation Player Award	2008

=== WHL and CHL ===
Award	Year
WHL East Second All-Star team	1988
Memorial Cup Tournament All-Star team	1988
Alumni Achievement Awards – Professional Hockey Achievement	2009

=== Vancouver Canucks team awards ===
Award	Year
Molson Cup	1989, 1991
Cyclone Taylor Award	1989, 1991, 1995, 1996
Most Exciting Player	1989, 1991
Cyrus H. McLean Trophy	1991, 1992

Awards and achievements
Preceded by Dan Woodley	Vancouver Canucks first-round draft pick 1988	Succeeded by Jason Herter
Preceded by Kris King	King Clancy Memorial Trophy winner 1997	Succeeded by Kelly Chase
Sporting positions
Preceded by Stan Smyl	Vancouver Canucks captain 1990–97 with Doug Lidster and Dan Quinn, 1990–91	Succeeded by Mark Messier
Preceded by Bryan McCabe	New York Islanders captain 1998–99	Succeeded by Kenny Jonsson
Preceded by Mike Gartner	NHLPA President; 1998–2006	Succeeded by Abolished
