= 1992–93 St. Louis Blues season =

National Hockey League team season

1992–93 St. Louis Blues
- Division: 4th Norris
- Conference: 8th Campbell
- 1992–93 record: 37–36–11
- Home record: 22–13–7
- Road record: 15–23–4
- Goals for: 282
- Goals against: 278

Team information
- General manager: Ron Caron
- Coach: Bob Plager (Oct.); Bob Berry (Oct.–May)
- Captain: Brett Hull
- Alternate captains: Garth Butcher; Ron Sutter
- Arena: St. Louis Arena
- Average attendance: 16,737

Team leaders
- Goals: Brett Hull (54)
- Assists: Craig Janney (82)
- Points: Craig Janney (106)
- Penalty minutes: Garth Butcher (211)
- Plus/minus: Brendan Shanahan (+10)
- Wins: Curtis Joseph (29)
- Goals against average: Curtis Joseph (3.02)

The 1992–93 St. Louis Blues season witnessed the Blues finish fourth in the Norris Division with a record of 37 wins, 36 losses and 11 ties for 85 points. In the playoffs, they pulled off a shocking upset of the division champion Chicago Blackhawks in the Norris Division Semifinals. However, their run ended in the Norris Division Finals, which they lost in seven games to the Toronto Maple Leafs.

The Blues endured a coaching change early in the season, when head coach Bob Plager resigned after only 11 games. He was replaced by assistant general manager Bob Berry.

== Offseason ==
Forward Brett Hull was named team captain, replacing defenceman Garth Butcher.

== Regular season ==
The Blues finished with the best penalty kill in the league (83.68%), allowing only 70 goals in 429 short-handed situations.

=== Final standings ===
Norris Division
	GP	W	L	T	Pts	GF	GA
**Chicago Blackhawks**	84	47	25	12	**106**	279	230
**Detroit Red Wings**	84	47	28	9	**103**	369	280
**Toronto Maple Leafs**	84	44	29	11	**99**	288	241
**St. Louis Blues**	84	37	36	11	**85**	282	278
Minnesota North Stars	84	36	38	10	82	272	293
Tampa Bay Lightning	84	23	54	7	53	245	332

Note: GP = Games played, W = Wins, L = Losses, T = Ties, Pts = Points, GF = Goals for, GA = Goals against
Note: Teams that qualified for the playoffs are highlighted in bold.

== Schedule and results ==
=== Regular season ===
1992–93 regular season
October: 5–6–1 (home: 4–4–1; road: 1–2–0)

Game	Date	Score	Opponent	Record	Recap
1	October 6, 1992	6–4	Minnesota North Stars (1992–93)	1–0–0	W
2	October 8, 1992	2–5	@ Minnesota North Stars (1992–93)	1–1–0	L
3	October 10, 1992	0–3	Chicago Blackhawks (1992–93)	1–2–0	L
4	October 13, 1992	1–2	Tampa Bay Lightning (1992–93)	1–3–0	L
5	October 15, 1992	4–5	Minnesota North Stars (1992–93)	1–4–0	L
6	October 17, 1992	6–5	@ Quebec Nordiques (1992–93)	2–4–0	W
7	October 19, 1992	2–6	@ Montreal Canadiens (1992–93)	2–5–0	L
8	October 21, 1992	5–5 OT	Quebec Nordiques (1992–93)	2–5–1	T
9	October 24, 1992	1–6	Detroit Red Wings (1992–93)	2–6–1	L
10	October 26, 1992	4–1	San Jose Sharks (1992–93)	3–6–1	W
11	October 29, 1992	6–4	Pittsburgh Penguins (1992–93)	4–6–1	W
12	October 31, 1992	6–4	Philadelphia Flyers (1992–93)	5–6–1	W

November: 3–6–3 (home: 3–0–2; road: 0–6–1)

Game	Date	Score	Opponent	Record	Recap
13	November 3, 1992	4–6	@ Tampa Bay Lightning (1992–93)	5–7–1	L
14	November 5, 1992	4–8	@ Pittsburgh Penguins (1992–93)	5–8–1	L
15	November 7, 1992	2–4	@ Philadelphia Flyers (1992–93)	5–9–1	L
16	November 10, 1992	4–4 OT	Edmonton Oilers (1992–93)	5–9–2	T
17	November 12, 1992	0–1	@ Chicago Blackhawks (1992–93)	5–10–2	L
18	November 14, 1992	4–2	Winnipeg Jets (1992–93)	6–10–2	W
19	November 16, 1992	2–2 OT	@ Toronto Maple Leafs (1992–93)	6–10–3	T
20	November 18, 1992	2–5	@ Hartford Whalers (1992–93)	6–11–3	L
21	November 21, 1992	4–2	Tampa Bay Lightning (1992–93)	7–11–3	W
22	November 25, 1992	6–11	@ Detroit Red Wings (1992–93)	7–12–3	L
23	November 26, 1992	7–5	Vancouver Canucks (1992–93)	8–12–3	W
24	November 28, 1992	2–2 OT	Detroit Red Wings (1992–93)	8–12–4	T

December: 5–7–1 (home: 2–4–0; road: 3–3–1)

Game	Date	Score	Opponent	Record	Recap
25	December 1, 1992	8–4	Hartford Whalers (1992–93)	9–12–4	W
26	December 4, 1992	3–5	@ Calgary Flames (1992–93)	9–13–4	L
27	December 5, 1992	5–1	@ Edmonton Oilers (1992–93)	10–13–4	W
28	December 7, 1992	3–4	@ Vancouver Canucks (1992–93)	10–14–4	L
29	December 10, 1992	3–2	@ San Jose Sharks (1992–93)	11–14–4	W
30	December 12, 1992	3–6	@ Los Angeles Kings (1992–93)	11–15–4	L
31	December 15, 1992	3–4 OT	New York Islanders (1992–93)	11–16–4	L
32	December 17, 1992	3–4	New York Rangers (1992–93)	11–17–4	L
33	December 19, 1992	0–1	Winnipeg Jets (1992–93)	11–18–4	L
34	December 22, 1992	2–2 OT	@ Minnesota North Stars (1992–93)	11–18–5	T
35	December 26, 1992	3–2 OT	@ Chicago Blackhawks (1992–93)	12–18–5	W
36	December 27, 1992	3–6	Toronto Maple Leafs (1992–93)	12–19–5	L
37	December 31, 1992	5–1	New York Islanders (1992–93)	13–19–5	W

January: 9–4–2 (home: 5–1–1; road: 4–3–1)

Game	Date	Score	Opponent	Record	Recap
38	January 2, 1993	2–2 OT	@ Toronto Maple Leafs (1992–93)	13–19–6	T
39	January 3, 1993	5–6 OT	@ Buffalo Sabres (1992–93)	13–20–6	L
40	January 5, 1993	6–1	Edmonton Oilers (1992–93)	14–20–6	W
41	January 7, 1993	3–2 OT	Calgary Flames (1992–93)	15–20–6	W
42	January 9, 1993	4–1	Chicago Blackhawks (1992–93)	16–20–6	W
43	January 11, 1993	1–0	@ Detroit Red Wings (1992–93)	17–20–6	W
44	January 13, 1993	3–4	@ Toronto Maple Leafs (1992–93)	17–21–6	L
45	January 14, 1993	4–1	@ Ottawa Senators (1992–93)	18–21–6	W
46	January 16, 1993	5–3	@ Tampa Bay Lightning (1992–93)	19–21–6	W
47	January 19, 1993	1–5	Toronto Maple Leafs (1992–93)	19–22–6	L
48	January 21, 1993	3–5	@ Detroit Red Wings (1992–93)	19–23–6	L
49	January 23, 1993	4–3	Detroit Red Wings (1992–93)	20–23–6	W
50	January 26, 1993	5–1	Ottawa Senators (1992–93)	21–23–6	W
51	January 28, 1993	4–2	@ Tampa Bay Lightning (1992–93)	22–23–6	W
52	January 30, 1993	2–2 OT	New Jersey Devils (1992–93)	22–23–7	T

February: 7–6–1 (home: 3–3–1; road: 4–3–0)

Game	Date	Score	Opponent	Record	Recap
53	February 1, 1993	1–1 OT	Toronto Maple Leafs (1992–93)	22–23–8	T
54	February 3, 1993	4–2	@ Winnipeg Jets (1992–93)	23–23–8	W
55	February 8, 1993	3–1	@ Hartford Whalers (1992–93)	24–23–8	W
56	February 9, 1993	1–6	Boston Bruins (1992–93)	24–24–8	L
57	February 11, 1993	6–10	Washington Capitals (1992–93)	24–25–8	L
58	February 13, 1993	4–3	Detroit Red Wings (1992–93)	25–25–8	W
59	February 15, 1993	1–4	@ New York Rangers (1992–93)	25–26–8	L
60	February 17, 1993	3–4	@ New Jersey Devils (1992–93)	25–27–8	L
61	February 18, 1993	4–2	@ New York Islanders (1992–93)	26–27–8	W
62	February 21, 1993	2–5	@ Washington Capitals (1992–93)	26–28–8	L
63	February 23, 1993	1–5	Montreal Canadiens (1992–93)	26–29–8	L
64	February 25, 1993	3–0	Los Angeles Kings (1992–93)	27–29–8	W
65	February 27, 1993	3–2	Minnesota North Stars (1992–93)	28–29–8	W
66	February 28, 1993	7–1	@ Chicago Blackhawks (1992–93)	29–29–8	W

March: 6–4–1 (home: 3–1–1; road: 3–3–0)

Game	Date	Score	Opponent	Record	Recap
67	March 4, 1993	2–1	Calgary Flames (1992–93)	30–29–8	W
68	March 6, 1993	3–4 OT	@ Boston Bruins (1992–93)	30–30–8	L
69	March 11, 1993	5–2	San Jose Sharks (1992–93)	31–30–8	W
70	March 13, 1993	6–2	Minnesota North Stars (1992–93)	32–30–8	W
71	March 14, 1993	3–1	@ Minnesota North Stars (1992–93)	33–30–8	W
72	March 16, 1993	2–2 OT	Buffalo Sabres (1992–93)	33–30–9	T
73	March 20, 1993	2–3	@ Los Angeles Kings (1992–93)	33–31–9	L
74	March 22, 1993	3–1	@ Vancouver Canucks (1992–93)	34–31–9	W
75	March 24, 1993	4–2	@ Calgary Flames (1992–93)	35–31–9	W
76	March 26, 1993	2–4	@ Winnipeg Jets (1992–93)	35–32–9	L
77	March 30, 1993	3–6	Vancouver Canucks (1992–93)	35–33–9	L

April: 2–3–2 (home: 2–0–1; road: 0–3–1)

Game	Date	Score	Opponent	Record	Recap
78	April 3, 1993	3–3 OT	Chicago Blackhawks (1992–93)	35–33–10	T
79	April 4, 1993	4–5	@ Chicago Blackhawks (1992–93)	35–34–10	L
80	April 6, 1993	2–2 OT	@ Tampa Bay Lightning (1992–93)	35–34–11	T
81	April 10, 1993	3–4	@ Minnesota North Stars (1992–93)	35–35–11	L
82	April 11, 1993	5–1	Minnesota North Stars (1992–93)	36–35–11	W
83	April 13, 1993	1–2 OT	@ Toronto Maple Leafs (1992–93)	36–36–11	L
84	April 15, 1993	6–5	Tampa Bay Lightning (1992–93)	37–36–11	W

**Legend**: W Win (2 points) L Loss (0 points) T Tie (1 point)

=== Playoffs ===
1993 Stanley Cup playoffs
Norris Division Semifinals vs. (N1) Chicago Blackhawks – Blues win 4–0

Game	Date	Score	Opponent	Series	Recap
1	April 18, 1993	4–3	@ Chicago Blackhawks	Blues lead 1–0	W
2	April 21, 1993	2–0	@ Chicago Blackhawks	Blues lead 2–0	W
3	April 23, 1993	3–0	Chicago Blackhawks	Blues lead 3–0	W
4	April 25, 1993	4–3 OT	Chicago Blackhawks	Blues win 4–0	W

Norris Division Finals vs. (N3) Toronto Maple Leafs – Maple Leafs win 4–3

Game	Date	Score	Opponent	Series	Recap
1	May 3, 1993	1–2 2OT	@ Toronto Maple Leafs	Maple Leafs lead 1–0	L
2	May 5, 1993	2–1 2OT	@ Toronto Maple Leafs	Series tied 1–1	W
3	May 7, 1993	4–3	Toronto Maple Leafs	Blues lead 2–1	W
4	May 9, 1993	1–4	Toronto Maple Leafs	Series tied 2–2	L
5	May 11, 1993	1–5	@ Toronto Maple Leafs	Maple Leafs lead 3–2	L
6	May 13, 1993	2–1	Toronto Maple Leafs	Series tied 3–3	W
7	May 15, 1993	0–6	@ Toronto Maple Leafs	Maple Leafs win 4–3	L

**Legend**: W Win L Loss

== Player statistics ==
=== Forwards ===
Note: GP= Games played; G= Goals; A= Assists; Pts = Points; PIM = Penalties in minutes

Player	GP	G	A	Pts	PIM
Craig Janney	84	24	82	106	12
Brett Hull	80	54	47	101	41
Brendan Shanahan	71	51	43	94	174
Nelson Emerson	82	22	51	73	62
Kevin Miller	72	24	22	46	65
Rich Sutter	84	13	14	27	100
Igor Korolev	74	4	23	27	20
Ron Sutter	59	12	15	27	99
Bob Bassen	53	9	10	19	63
Ron Wilson	78	8	11	19	44
Dave Lowry	58	5	8	13	101
Philippe Bozon	54	6	6	12	55
Kelly Chase	49	2	5	7	204
David Mackey	15	1	4	5	23
Vitali Prokhorov	26	4	1	5	15
Basil McRae	33	1	3	4	98
Kevin Miehm	8	1	3	4	4
Denny Felsner	6	0	3	3	2
Jason Ruff	7	2	1	3	8
Vitali Karamnov	7	0	1	1	0

=== Defensemen ===
Note: GP= Games played; G= Goals; A= Assists; Pts = Points; PIM = Penalties in minutes

Player	GP	G	A	Pts	PIM
Jeff Brown	71	25	53	78	58
Rick Zombo	71	0	15	15	78
Garth Butcher	84	5	10	15	211
Stephane Quintal	75	1	10	11	100
Lee Norwood	32	3	7	10	63
Doug Crossman	19	2	7	9	10
Bret Hedican	42	0	8	8	30
Paul Cavallini	11	1	4	5	10
Murray Baron	53	2	2	4	59
Curt Giles	48	0	4	4	40
Daniel Laperriere	5	0	1	1	0

=== Goaltending ===
Note: GP= Games played; W= Wins; L= Losses; T = Ties; SO = Shutouts; GAA = Goals Against Average

Player	GP	W	L	T	SO	GAA	Sv%
Curtis Joseph	68	29	28	9	1	3.02	.911
Guy Hebert	24	8	8	2	1	3.67	.883

== Draft picks ==
St. Louis' draft picks at the 1992 NHL entry draft held at the Montreal Forum in Montreal.

Round	Pick	Player	Position	School/club team
2	38	Igor Korolev	Center	Dynamo Moscow (Russia)
3	62	Vitali Karamnov	Left wing	Dynamo Moscow (Russia)
3	64	Vitali Prokhorov	Left wing	Spartak Moscow (Russia)
4	86	Lee Leslie	Left wing	Prince Albert Raiders (WHL)
6	134	Bob Lachance	Right wing	Springfield Olympics (EJHL)
7	158	Ian Laperriere	Right wing	Drummondville Voltigeurs (QMJHL)
7	160	Lance Burns	Center	Lethbridge Hurricanes (WHL)
8	180	Igor Boldin	Center	Spartak Moscow (Russia)
8	182	Nick Naumenko	Defense	Dubuque Fighting Saints (USHL)
9	206	Todd Harris	Defense	Tri-City Americans (WHL)
10	230	Yuri Gunko	Defense	Sokil Kyiv (Ukraine)
11	259	Wade Salzman	Goaltender	East High School (Duluth) (USHS-MN)
