= 1992–93 San Jose Sharks season =

National Hockey League season

1992–93 San Jose Sharks
- Division: 6th Smythe
- Conference: 12th Campbell
- 1992–93 record: 11–71–2
- Home record: 8–33–1
- Road record: 3–38–1
- Goals for: 218
- Goals against: 414

Team information
- General manager: Chuck Grillo; Dean Lombardi
- Coach: George Kingston
- Captain: Doug Wilson
- Alternate captains: Kelly Kisio; Rob Zettler
- Arena: Cow Palace
- Average attendance: 11,045
- Minor league affiliate: Kansas City Blades

Team leaders
- Goals: Kelly Kisio (26)
- Assists: Kelly Kisio (52)
- Points: Kelly Kisio (78)
- Penalty minutes: Jeff Odgers (253)
- Plus/minus: Lyndon Byers (–2)
- Wins: Arturs Irbe (7)
- Goals against average: Arturs Irbe (4.11)

The 1992–93 San Jose Sharks season was the team's second in the NHL. They set league records for most losses in a season with 71 losses, most consecutive losses, with 17 in a row, and fewest ties in a season since the 1949-50 season with 2. Their worst defeat of the season was a 13–1 loss to the Calgary Flames, a game where after the Sharks scored first, the Flames countered by scoring 13 unanswered goals.

The team had recorded its first shutout, attained by rookie goaltender Arturs Irbe, and Rob Gaudreau scored the first hat-trick in franchise history. Head coach George Kingston, the first head coach in the history of the Sharks, was fired following this tumultuous season and replaced by Kevin Constantine. It was the last season the Sharks played in the Cow Palace in Daly City.

== Offseason ==
The Sharks chose Mike Rathje with their first-round pick in the entry draft, third overall.

== Regular season ==
The Sharks allowed the most goals (414) and most even-strength goals (286) of all 24 teams during the regular season. They were also shut out a league-high 6 times and tied the Edmonton Oilers and Ottawa Senators for the fewest power-play goals scored, with 66.

On Tuesday, November 17, 1992, Arturs Irbe recorded the first shutout in Sharks history, as San Jose blanked the Los Angeles Kings 6–0 at home.

On Thursday, December 3, 1992, in a 7–5 home loss against the Hartford Whalers, Rob Gaudreau scored the first hat trick in Sharks history. In that same game, Kelly Kisio and Johan Garpenlov each recorded 4 points (1 goal, 3 assists).

In 2004, ESPN ranked the 1992–93 Sharks as the sixth worst team in the first 25 years of the ESPN era.

=== Season standings ===
Smythe Division
	GP	W	L	T	Pts	GF	GA
**Vancouver Canucks**	84	46	29	9	**101**	346	278
**Calgary Flames**	84	43	30	11	**97**	322	282
**Los Angeles Kings**	84	39	35	10	**88**	338	340
**Winnipeg Jets**	84	40	37	7	**87**	322	320
Edmonton Oilers	84	26	50	8	60	242	337
San Jose Sharks	84	11	71	2	24	218	414

Note: GP = Games played, W = Wins, L = Losses, T = Ties, Pts = Points, GF = Goals for, GA = Goals against
Note: Teams that qualified for the playoffs are highlighted in bold.

== Schedule and results ==
1992–93 regular season
October: 2–9–0 (home: 1–3–0; road: 1–6–0)

Game	Date	Score	Opponent	Record	Recap
1	October 8, 1992	4–3 OT	Winnipeg Jets (1992–93)	1–0–0	W
2	October 10, 1992	3–6	Detroit Red Wings (1992–93)	1–1–0	L
3	October 13, 1992	1–2	@ Los Angeles Kings (1992–93)	1–2–0	L
4	October 15, 1992	2–8	Boston Bruins (1992–93)	1–3–0	L
5	October 17, 1992	2–6	Calgary Flames (1992–93)	1–4–0	L
6	October 21, 1992	4–8	@ Montreal Canadiens (1992–93)	1–5–0	L
7	October 23, 1992	4–5	@ Buffalo Sabres (1992–93)	1–6–0	L
8	October 24, 1992	1–5	@ Toronto Maple Leafs (1992–93)	1–7–0	L
9	October 26, 1992	1–4	@ St. Louis Blues (1992–93)	1–8–0	L
10	October 28, 1992	3–4	@ Detroit Red Wings (1992–93)	1–9–0	L
11	October 30, 1992	2–1	@ Tampa Bay Lightning (1992–93)	2–9–0	W

November: 3–9–1 (home: 2–6–0; road: 1–3–1)

Game	Date	Score	Opponent	Record	Recap
12	November 1, 1992	4–4 OT	@ Chicago Blackhawks (1992–93)	2–9–1	T
13	November 5, 1992	7–5	Buffalo Sabres (1992–93)	3–9–1	W
14	November 7, 1992	1–6	New Jersey Devils (1992–93)	3–10–1	L
15	November 8, 1992	4–11	Los Angeles Kings (1992–93)	3–11–1	L
16	November 10, 1992	2–6	@ Vancouver Canucks (1992–93)	3–12–1	L
17	November 12, 1992	3–4	Edmonton Oilers (1992–93)	3–13–1	L
18	November 14, 1992	2–5	Vancouver Canucks (1992–93)	3–14–1	L
19	November 17, 1992	6–0	Los Angeles Kings (1992–93)	4–14–1	W
20	November 19, 1992	0–2	Toronto Maple Leafs (1992–93)	4–15–1	L
21	November 21, 1992	1–2	Chicago Blackhawks (1992–93)	4–16–1	L
22	November 25, 1992	4–3 OT	@ Calgary Flames (1992–93)	5–16–1	W
23	November 27, 1992	2–3 OT	@ Winnipeg Jets (1992–93)	5–17–1	L
24	November 28, 1992	3–10	@ Minnesota North Stars (1992–93)	5–18–1	L

December: 1–13–0 (home: 1–8–0; road: 0–5–0)

Game	Date	Score	Opponent	Record	Recap
25	December 1, 1992	1–3	Edmonton Oilers (1992–93)	5–19–1	L
26	December 3, 1992	5–7	Hartford Whalers (1992–93)	5–20–1	L
27	December 5, 1992	4–9	Pittsburgh Penguins (1992–93)	5–21–1	L
28	December 9, 1992	3–8	@ Vancouver Canucks (1992–93)	5–22–1	L
29	December 10, 1992	2–3	St. Louis Blues (1992–93)	5–23–1	L
30	December 12, 1992	7–8 OT	Quebec Nordiques (1992–93)	5–24–1	L
31	December 16, 1992	4–5 OT	Tampa Bay Lightning (1992–93)	5–25–1	L
32	December 18, 1992	1–8	@ Vancouver Canucks (1992–93)	5–26–1	L
33	December 19, 1992	3–6	Vancouver Canucks (1992–93)	5–27–1	L
34	December 21, 1992	4–5	@ Winnipeg Jets (1992–93)	5–28–1	L
35	December 23, 1992	2–4	@ Edmonton Oilers (1992–93)	5–29–1	L
36	December 26, 1992	7–2	Los Angeles Kings (1992–93)	6–29–1	W
37	December 29, 1992	5–7	@ Vancouver Canucks (1992–93)	6–30–1	L
38	December 30, 1992	2–6	Philadelphia Flyers (1992–93)	6–31–1	L

January: 0–13–1 (home: 0–3–1; road: 0–10–0)

Game	Date	Score	Opponent	Record	Recap
39	January 2, 1993	2–2 OT	Vancouver Canucks (1992–93)	6–31–2	T
40	January 4, 1993	1–4	@ Montreal Canadiens (1992–93)	6–32–2	L
41	January 5, 1993	1–2	Montreal Canadiens (1992–93)	6–33–2	L
42	January 8, 1993	1–5	@ Toronto Maple Leafs (1992–93)	6–34–2	L
43	January 10, 1993	2–3	@ Ottawa Senators (1992–93)	6–35–2	L
44	January 12, 1993	1–4	@ Winnipeg Jets (1992–93)	6–36–2	L
45	January 15, 1993	3–6	@ Detroit Red Wings (1992–93)	6–37–2	L
46	January 16, 1993	1–4	@ Quebec Nordiques (1992–93)	6–38–2	L
47	January 18, 1993	3–4	@ Boston Bruins (1992–93)	6–39–2	L
48	January 21, 1993	2–4	@ Hartford Whalers (1992–93)	6–40–2	L
49	January 23, 1993	1–5	@ Tampa Bay Lightning (1992–93)	6–41–2	L
50	January 26, 1993	1–7	@ Los Angeles Kings (1992–93)	6–42–2	L
51	January 29, 1993	2–4	Chicago Blackhawks (1992–93)	6–43–2	L
52	January 30, 1993	4–5	Calgary Flames (1992–93)	6–44–2	L

February: 2–11–0 (home: 1–7–0; road: 1–4–0)

Game	Date	Score	Opponent	Record	Recap
53	February 1, 1993	4–5	Tampa Bay Lightning (1992–93)	6–45–2	L
54	February 3, 1993	3–7	Minnesota North Stars (1992–93)	6–46–2	L
55	February 10, 1993	1–13	@ Calgary Flames (1992–93)	6–47–2	L
56	February 12, 1993	0–6	@ Edmonton Oilers (1992–93)	6–48–2	L
57	February 14, 1993	3–2	@ Winnipeg Jets (1992–93)	7–48–2	W
58	February 16, 1993	3–4	Washington Capitals (1992–93)	7–49–2	L
59	February 18, 1993	5–3	Winnipeg Jets (1992–93)	8–49–2	W
60	February 20, 1993	4–6	New York Rangers (1992–93)	8–50–2	L
61	February 22, 1993	0–4	New York Rangers (1992–93)	8–51–2	L
62	February 23, 1993	3–6	Calgary Flames (1992–93)	8–52–2	L
63	February 25, 1993	0–5	Toronto Maple Leafs (1992–93)	8–53–2	L
64	February 27, 1993	4–5	@ Calgary Flames (1992–93)	8–54–2	L
65	February 28, 1993	1–4	@ Edmonton Oilers (1992–93)	8–55–2	L

March: 2–10–0 (home: 2–2–0; road: 0–8–0)

Game	Date	Score	Opponent	Record	Recap
66	March 2, 1993	3–2 OT	Ottawa Senators (1992–93)	9–55–2	W
67	March 7, 1993	6–3	Edmonton Oilers (1992–93)	10–55–2	W
68	March 9, 1993	2–4	@ Minnesota North Stars (1992–93)	10–56–2	L
69	March 11, 1993	2–5	@ St. Louis Blues (1992–93)	10–57–2	L
70	March 14, 1993	1–4	Detroit Red Wings (1992–93)	10–58–2	L
71	March 16, 1993	0–6	New York Islanders (1992–93)	10–59–2	L
72	March 19, 1993	1–8	@ New York Rangers (1992–93)	10–60–2	L
73	March 21, 1993	3–5	@ Washington Capitals (1992–93)	10–61–2	L
74	March 23, 1993	2–7	@ Pittsburgh Penguins (1992–93)	10–62–2	L
75	March 25, 1993	2–5	@ Philadelphia Flyers (1992–93)	10–63–2	L
76	March 27, 1993	3–7	@ New York Islanders (1992–93)	10–64–2	L
77	March 29, 1993	0–5	@ New Jersey Devils (1992–93)	10–65–2	L

April: 1–6–0 (home: 1–4–0; road: 0–2–0)

Game	Date	Score	Opponent	Record	Recap
78	April 1, 1993	5–9	Winnipeg Jets (1992–93)	10–66–2	L
79	April 3, 1993	2–3 OT	Calgary Flames (1992–93)	10–67–2	L
80	April 4, 1993	3–4	Calgary Flames (1992–93)	10–68–2	L
81	April 6, 1993	5–2	Edmonton Oilers (1992–93)	11–68–2	W
82	April 8, 1993	1–2	@ Los Angeles Kings (1992–93)	11–69–2	L
83	April 10, 1993	2–3 OT	Los Angeles Kings (1992–93)	11–70–2	L
84	April 15, 1993	3–7	@ Calgary Flames (1992–93)	11–71–2	L

Legend: W Win (2 points) L Loss (0 points) T Tie (1 point)

== Player statistics ==
=== Forwards ===
Note: GP= Games played; G= Goals; AST= Assists; PTS = Points; PIM = Points

Player	GP	G	AST	PTS	PIM
Dean Evason	84	12	19	31	132
Mike Sullivan	81	6	8	14	30
Johan Garpenlov	79	22	44	66	56
Kelly Kisio	78	26	52	78	90
Jeff Odgers	66	12	15	27	253
Rob Gaudreau	59	23	20	43	18
John Carter	55	7	9	16	81
David Maley	43	1	6	7	126
Robin Bawa	42	5	0	5	47
Pat Falloon	41	14	14	28	12
Ed Courtenay	39	7	13	20	10
Hubie McDonough	30	6	2	8	6
Perry Berezan	28	3	4	7	28
Mark Pederson	27	7	3	10	22
Ray Whitney	26	4	6	10	4
Michel Picard	25	4	0	4	24
Dave Snuggerud	25	4	5	9	14
Brian Lawton	21	2	8	10	12
Yvon Corriveau	20	3	7	10	0
Larry DePalma	20	2	6	8	41
Lyndon Byers	18	4	1	5	122
David Bruce	17	2	3	5	33
Petri Skriko	17	4	3	7	6
J. F. Quintin	14	2	5	7	4
Jon Morris	13	0	3	3	6
Dody Wood	13	1	1	2	71
Dale Craigwell	8	3	1	4	4
Jaroslav Otevrel	7	0	2	2	0
Mark Beaufait	5	1	0	1	0
Mikhail Kravets	1	0	0	0	0

=== Defensemen ===
Note: GP= Games played; G= Goals; AST= Assists; PTS = Points; PIM = Points

Player	GP	G	AST	PTS	PIM
Doug Zmolek	84	5	10	15	229
Rob Zettler	80	0	7	7	150
Jayson More	73	5	6	11	179
Neil Wilkinson	59	1	7	8	96
Tom Pederson	44	7	13	20	31
Doug Wilson	42	3	17	20	40
David Williams	40	1	11	12	49
Sandis Ozolinsh	37	7	16	23	40
Peter Ahola	20	2	3	5	16
Pat MacLeod	13	0	1	1	10
Dean Kolstad	10	0	2	2	12
Claudio Scremin	4	0	1	1	4

=== Goaltending ===
Note: GP= Games played; W= Wins; L= Losses; T = Ties; SO = Shutouts; GAA = Goals Against

Player	GP	W	L	T	SO	GAA
Jeff Hackett	36	2	30	1	0	5.28
Arturs Irbe	36	7	26	0	1	4.11
Brian Hayward	18	2	14	1	0	5.55
Wade Flaherty	1	0	1	0	0	5.02

== Transactions ==
=== Trades ===
June 15, 1992	To Toronto Maple Leafs Jarmo Myllys	To San Jose Sharks Future considerations
August 24, 1992	To New York Islanders Brian Mullen	To San Jose Sharks rights to Markus Thuresson
August 28, 1992	To New York Islanders Cash	To San Jose Sharks Hubie McDonough
October 9, 1992	To Hartford Whalers Future considerations	To San Jose Sharks Michel Picard
December 15, 1992	To Vancouver Canucks Rick Lessard	To San Jose Sharks Robin Bawa
December 18, 1992	To Philadelphia Flyers Dave Snuggerud	To San Jose Sharks Mark Pederson; Future considerations
January 22, 1993	To New Jersey Devils Brian Lawton	To San Jose Sharks Future considerations
February 26, 1993	To Pittsburgh Penguins Future considerations	To San Jose Sharks Peter Ahola

=== Free agency ===
Date	Player	Previous team
August 27, 1992	Petri Skriko	Winnipeg Jets
November 7, 1992	Lyndon Byers	Boston Bruins

Date	Player	New team
July 1, 1992	Kevin Evans	Kalamazoo Wings (IHL)
September 1, 1992	Peter Lappin	

=== Waivers ===
Date	Player	Team
October 4, 1992	Yvon Corriveau	from Washington Capitals in waiver draft
October 4, 1992	Igor Larionov	from Vancouver Canucks in waiver draft
January 1, 1993	David Maley	from Edmonton Oilers
March 13, 1993	Jon Morris	from New Jersey Devils

=== Released ===
Date	Player	New Team
July 23, 1992	Perry Anderson	San Diego Gulls (IHL)
July 23, 1992	Steve Bozek	HC Bolzano (ITA)
July 23, 1992	Paul Fenton	
September 21, 1992	Craig Coxe	Kalamazoo Wings (IHL)
November 30, 1992	Petri Skriko	Kiekko-Espoo (SM-l)
January 15, 1993	Don Barber	Kansas City Blades (IHL)
February 19, 1993	Lyndon Byers	Kansas City Blades (IHL)

== Draft picks ==
=== NHL entry draft ===
San Jose's draft picks at the 1992 NHL entry draft held at the Montreal Forum in Montreal, Quebec.

Round	#	Player	Position	Nationality	College/Junior/Club team
1	3	Mike Rathje	Defense	Canada	Medicine Hat Tigers (WHL)
1	10	Andrei Nazarov	Left wing	Russia	HC Dynamo Moscow (Russia)
3	51	Alexander Cherbayev	Right wing	Russia	Voskresensk Khimik (Russia)
4	75	Jan Caloun	Right wing	Czechoslovakia	Litvinov Chemopetrol (Czech)
5	99	Marcus Ragnarsson	Defense	Sweden	Djurgardens IF Stockholm (SEL)
6	123	Michal Sykora	Defense	Czechoslovakia	Tacoma Rockets (WHL)
7	147	Eric Bellerose	Left wing	Canada	Trois-Rivières Draveurs (QMJHL)
8	171	Ryan Smith	Defense	Canada	Brandon Wheat Kings (WHL)
9	195	Chris Burns	Goalie	Canada	U. of Denver (NCAA)
10	219	Alex Kholomeyev	Right wing	Russia	Fort Worth Fire (CHL)
11	243	Victor Ignatjev	Defense	Latvia	Riga Pardaugava (Russia)

=== NHL supplemental draft ===
Round	#	Player	Position	Nationality	College/Junior/Club team
1	3	Brian Konowalchuk	Center	United States	U. of Denver (NCAA)
