= 1992–93 Chicago Blackhawks season =

National Hockey League team season

1992–93 Chicago Blackhawks
- Norris Division champions
- Division: 1st Norris
- Conference: 1st Campbell
- 1992–93 record: 47–25–12
- Home record: 25–11–6
- Road record: 22–14–6
- Goals for: 279
- Goals against: 230

Team information
- General manager: Mike Keenan (Oct.–Nov.); Bob Pulford (Nov.–Apr.)
- Coach: Darryl Sutter
- Captain: Dirk Graham
- Alternate captains: Chris Chelios; Jeremy Roenick
- Arena: Chicago Stadium
- Average attendance: 17,776

Team leaders
- Goals: Jeremy Roenick (50)
- Assists: Chris Chelios (58)
- Points: Jeremy Roenick (107)
- Penalty minutes: Bryan Marchment (313)
- Plus/minus: Steve Larmer (+23)
- Wins: Ed Belfour (41)
- Goals against average: Ed Belfour (2.59)

The 1992–93 Chicago Blackhawks season was the 67th season of operation of the Chicago Blackhawks in the National Hockey League (NHL).

== Off-season ==
After reaching the 1992 Stanley Cup Final, the Blackhawks did not stand pat and again made several moves. The most significant move was arguably head coach Mike Keenan replacing himself in the position with his hand-picked successor, Darryl Sutter. The other significant off-season move was trading future Hockey Hall of Fame goaltender Dominik Hasek to the Buffalo Sabres in exchange for Stephane Beauregard, who ultimately never played for the Blackhawks, and a fourth-round draft pick in 1993 with which Chicago selected future player Eric Daze.

== Regular season ==
On November 6, general manager Mike Keenan was fired and replaced by Bob Pulford.

Over the regular season, the Blackhawks led the NHL in most shutouts for (9), fewest goals against (230) and fewest even-strength goals against (139). They also had the most power-play opportunities (510). Goaltender Ed Belfour led all goaltenders in games (71), shutouts (7) and minutes played (4,106).

=== Final standings ===
Norris Division
	GP	W	L	T	Pts	GF	GA
**Chicago Blackhawks**	84	47	25	12	**106**	279	230
**Detroit Red Wings**	84	47	28	9	**103**	369	280
**Toronto Maple Leafs**	84	44	29	11	**99**	288	241
**St. Louis Blues**	84	37	36	11	**85**	282	278
Minnesota North Stars	84	36	38	10	82	272	293
Tampa Bay Lightning	84	23	54	7	53	245	332

Note: GP = Games played, W = Wins, L = Losses, T = Ties, Pts = Points, GF = Goals for, GA = Goals against
Note: Teams that qualified for the playoffs are highlighted in bold.

== Playoffs ==
The Blackhawks fell in the first round to St. Louis 4 games to 0.

== Schedule and results ==
=== Regular season ===
1992–93 regular season
October: 4–5–2 (home: 2–2–2; road: 2–3–0)

Game	Date	Score	Opponent	Record	Recap
1	October 7, 1992	3–7	@ Tampa Bay Lightning (1992–93)	0–1–0	L
2	October 10, 1992	3–0	@ St. Louis Blues (1992–93)	1–1–0	W
3	October 11, 1992	4–4 OT	Tampa Bay Lightning (1992–93)	1–1–1	T
4	October 15, 1992	3–4 OT	Edmonton Oilers (1992–93)	1–2–1	L
5	October 17, 1992	3–4	@ Toronto Maple Leafs (1992–93)	1–3–1	L
6	October 18, 1992	3–1	Vancouver Canucks (1992–93)	2–3–1	W
7	October 21, 1992	1–4	@ Buffalo Sabres (1992–93)	2–4–1	L
8	October 22, 1992	5–6 OT	New Jersey Devils (1992–93)	2–5–1	L
9	October 25, 1992	8–2	Detroit Red Wings (1992–93)	3–5–1	W
10	October 29, 1992	5–5 OT	Philadelphia Flyers (1992–93)	3–5–2	T
11	October 31, 1992	3–2	@ Boston Bruins (1992–93)	4–5–2	W

November: 8–5–1 (home: 4–0–1; road: 4–5–0)

Game	Date	Score	Opponent	Record	Recap
12	November 1, 1992	4–4 OT	San Jose Sharks (1992–93)	4–5–3	T
13	November 3, 1992	1–4	@ Washington Capitals (1992–93)	4–6–3	L
14	November 5, 1992	1–0	Toronto Maple Leafs (1992–93)	5–6–3	W
15	November 7, 1992	7–4	@ Quebec Nordiques (1992–93)	6–6–3	W
16	November 8, 1992	7–2	Pittsburgh Penguins (1992–93)	7–6–3	W
17	November 12, 1992	1–0	St. Louis Blues (1992–93)	8–6–3	W
18	November 14, 1992	0–3	@ Minnesota North Stars (1992–93)	8–7–3	L
19	November 15, 1992	2–1	Minnesota North Stars (1992–93)	9–7–3	W
20	November 17, 1992	4–5	@ Detroit Red Wings (1992–93)	9–8–3	L
21	November 19, 1992	1–4	@ Los Angeles Kings (1992–93)	9–9–3	L
22	November 21, 1992	2–1	@ San Jose Sharks (1992–93)	10–9–3	W
23	November 23, 1992	2–5	@ Vancouver Canucks (1992–93)	10–10–3	L
24	November 27, 1992	8–1	@ Edmonton Oilers (1992–93)	11–10–3	W
25	November 28, 1992	5–2	@ Calgary Flames (1992–93)	12–10–3	W

December: 10–4–1 (home: 6–3–0; road: 4–1–1)

Game	Date	Score	Opponent	Record	Recap
26	December 1, 1992	3–6	Los Angeles Kings (1992–93)	12–11–3	L
27	December 3, 1992	4–3	Toronto Maple Leafs (1992–93)	13–11–3	W
28	December 5, 1992	2–2 OT	@ Toronto Maple Leafs (1992–93)	13–11–4	T
29	December 6, 1992	2–0	Montreal Canadiens (1992–93)	14–11–4	W
30	December 8, 1992	3–2	@ Detroit Red Wings (1992–93)	15–11–4	W
31	December 10, 1992	5–3	New York Islanders (1992–93)	16–11–4	W
32	December 12, 1992	3–0	@ Minnesota North Stars (1992–93)	17–11–4	W
33	December 17, 1992	5–1	Winnipeg Jets (1992–93)	18–11–4	W
34	December 19, 1992	1–3	@ Philadelphia Flyers (1992–93)	18–12–4	L
35	December 20, 1992	4–0	Minnesota North Stars (1992–93)	19–12–4	W
36	December 23, 1992	4–2	@ Ottawa Senators (1992–93)	20–12–4	W
37	December 26, 1992	2–3 OT	St. Louis Blues (1992–93)	20–13–4	L
38	December 27, 1992	0–4	Detroit Red Wings (1992–93)	20–14–4	L
39	December 29, 1992	6–3	@ Detroit Red Wings (1992–93)	21–14–4	W
40	December 31, 1992	5–0	Tampa Bay Lightning (1992–93)	22–14–4	W

January: 9–3–4 (home: 5–1–1; road: 4–2–3)

Game	Date	Score	Opponent	Record	Recap
41	January 2, 1993	2–2 OT	@ Washington Capitals (1992–93)	22–14–5	T
42	January 3, 1993	4–1	Winnipeg Jets (1992–93)	23–14–5	W
43	January 7, 1993	3–3 OT	Edmonton Oilers (1992–93)	23–14–6	T
44	January 9, 1993	1–4	@ St. Louis Blues (1992–93)	23–15–6	L
45	January 10, 1993	4–5	Los Angeles Kings (1992–93)	23–16–6	L
46	January 12, 1993	3–1	@ Minnesota North Stars (1992–93)	24–16–6	W
47	January 14, 1993	3–1	Minnesota North Stars (1992–93)	25–16–6	W
48	January 16, 1993	5–3	@ Toronto Maple Leafs (1992–93)	26–16–6	W
49	January 17, 1993	5–3	Toronto Maple Leafs (1992–93)	27–16–6	W
50	January 19, 1993	2–5	@ Winnipeg Jets (1992–93)	27–17–6	L
51	January 21, 1993	6–2	Washington Capitals (1992–93)	28–17–6	W
52	January 23, 1993	6–2	@ Hartford Whalers (1992–93)	29–17–6	W
53	January 24, 1993	6–2	Vancouver Canucks (1992–93)	30–17–6	W
54	January 27, 1993	4–4 OT	@ Vancouver Canucks (1992–93)	30–17–7	T
55	January 29, 1993	4–2	@ San Jose Sharks (1992–93)	31–17–7	W
56	January 30, 1993	2–2 OT	@ Los Angeles Kings (1992–93)	31–17–8	T

February: 5–4–0 (home: 3–2–0; road: 2–2–0)

Game	Date	Score	Opponent	Record	Recap
57	February 3, 1993	0–5	@ Detroit Red Wings (1992–93)	31–18–8	L
58	February 11, 1993	6–3	Boston Bruins (1992–93)	32–18–8	W
59	February 13, 1993	1–4	@ Pittsburgh Penguins (1992–93)	32–19–8	L
60	February 14, 1993	3–5	Detroit Red Wings (1992–93)	32–20–8	L
61	February 18, 1993	7–2	Los Angeles Kings (1992–93)	33–20–8	W
62	February 21, 1993	4–3	Calgary Flames (1992–93)	34–20–8	W
63	February 25, 1993	5–1	@ Tampa Bay Lightning (1992–93)	35–20–8	W
64	February 27, 1993	2–1	@ Detroit Red Wings (1992–93)	36–20–8	W
65	February 28, 1993	1–7	St. Louis Blues (1992–93)	36–21–8	L

March: 6–3–2 (home: 3–2–1; road: 3–1–1)

Game	Date	Score	Opponent	Record	Recap
66	March 4, 1993	3–3 OT	Quebec Nordiques (1992–93)	36–21–9	T
67	March 5, 1993	1–1 OT	@ New Jersey Devils (1992–93)	36–21–10	T
68	March 7, 1993	4–2	Ottawa Senators (1992–93)	37–21–10	W
69	March 11, 1993	1–4	New York Rangers (1992–93)	37–22–10	L
70	March 14, 1993	5–4 OT	@ Edmonton Oilers (1992–93)	38–22–10	W
71	March 16, 1993	1–0	@ Calgary Flames (1992–93)	39–22–10	W
72	March 20, 1993	2–6	@ Montreal Canadiens (1992–93)	39–23–10	L
73	March 21, 1993	3–2	Tampa Bay Lightning (1992–93)	40–23–10	W
74	March 25, 1993	4–6	Buffalo Sabres (1992–93)	40–24–10	L
75	March 26, 1993	3–1	@ New York Rangers (1992–93)	41–24–10	W
76	March 28, 1993	3–0	Hartford Whalers (1992–93)	42–24–10	W

April: 5–1–2 (home: 2–1–1; road: 3–0–1)

Game	Date	Score	Opponent	Record	Recap
77	April 1, 1993	1–3	Detroit Red Wings (1992–93)	42–25–10	L
78	April 3, 1993	3–3 OT	@ St. Louis Blues (1992–93)	42–25–11	T
79	April 4, 1993	5–4	St. Louis Blues (1992–93)	43–25–11	W
80	April 8, 1993	3–2	@ New York Islanders (1992–93)	44–25–11	W
81	April 10, 1993	4–2	@ Tampa Bay Lightning (1992–93)	45–25–11	W
82	April 11, 1993	3–3 OT	Tampa Bay Lightning (1992–93)	45–25–12	T
83	April 13, 1993	3–2	@ Minnesota North Stars (1992–93)	46–25–12	W
84	April 15, 1993	3–2	Toronto Maple Leafs (1992–93)	47–25–12	W

**Legend**: W Win (2 points) L Loss (0 points) T Tie (1 point)

=== Playoffs ===
1993 Stanley Cup playoffs
Norris Division Semifinals vs. (N4) St. Louis Blues – Blues win 4–0

Game	Date	Score	Opponent	Series	Recap
1	April 18, 1993	3–4	St. Louis Blues	Blues lead 1–0	L
2	April 21, 1993	0–2	St. Louis Blues	Blues lead 2–0	L
3	April 23, 1993	0–3	@ St. Louis Blues	Blues lead 3–0	L
4	April 25, 1993	3–4 OT	@ St. Louis Blues	Blues win 4–0	L

**Legend**: W Win L Loss

== Player statistics ==
=== Scoring ===
- Position abbreviations: C = Center; D = Defense; G = Goaltender; LW = Left wing; RW = Right wing
- † = Joined team via a transaction (e.g., trade, waivers, signing) during the season. Stats reflect time with the Blackhawks only.
- ‡ = Left team via a transaction (e.g., trade, waivers, release) during the season. Stats reflect time with the Blackhawks only.

No.	Player	Pos	Regular season						Playoffs					
No.	Player	Pos	GP	G	A	Pts	+/-	PIM	GP	G	A	Pts	+/-	PIM
27	Jeremy Roenick	C	84	50	57	107	15	86	4	1	2	3	0	2
7	Chris Chelios	D	84	15	58	73	14	282	4	0	2	2	−1	14
28	Steve Larmer	RW	84	35	35	70	23	48	4	0	3	3	1	0
5	Steve Smith	D	78	10	47	57	12	214	4	0	0	0	−2	10
12	Brent Sutter	C	65	20	34	54	10	67	4	1	1	2	0	4
22	Christian Ruuttu	C	84	17	37	54	14	134	4	0	0	0	−1	2
16	Michel Goulet	LW	63	23	21	44	10	43	3	0	1	1	−1	0
33	Dirk Graham	RW	80	20	17	37	0	139	4	0	0	0	−1	0
32	Stephane Matteau	LW	79	15	18	33	6	98	3	0	1	1	−1	2
14	Greg Gilbert	LW	77	13	19	32	5	57	3	0	0	0	0	0
26	Jocelyn Lemieux	RW	81	10	21	31	5	111	4	1	0	1	0	2
10	Brian Noonan	RW	63	16	14	30	3	82	4	3	0	3	0	4
2	Bryan Marchment	D	78	5	15	20	15	313	4	0	0	0	1	12
6	Frantisek Kucera	D	71	5	14	19	7	59	—	—	—	—	—	—
25	Dave Christian	C	60	4	14	18	6	12	1	0	0	0	0	0
17	Joe Murphy†	RW	19	7	10	17	−3	18	4	0	0	0	−2	8
3	Igor Kravchuk‡	D	38	6	9	15	11	30	—	—	—	—	—	—
4	Keith Brown	D	33	2	6	8	3	39	4	0	1	1	1	2
44	Rob Brown	RW	15	1	6	7	6	33	—	—	—	—	—	—
20	Mike Hudson‡	C	36	1	6	7	−6	44	—	—	—	—	—	—
8	Cam Russell	D	67	2	4	6	5	151	4	0	0	0	0	0
45	Karl Dykhuis	D	12	0	5	5	2	0	—	—	—	—	—	—
19	Troy Murray†	C	22	1	3	4	0	25	4	0	0	0	0	2
30	Ed Belfour	G	71	0	3	3		28	4	0	0	0		2
23	Stu Grimson	LW	78	1	1	2	2	193	2	0	0	0	0	4
47	Adam Bennett	D	16	0	2	2	−2	8	—	—	—	—	—	—
15	Brad Lauer	LW	7	0	1	1	−1	2	—	—	—	—	—	—
43	Milan Tichy	D	13	0	1	1	7	30	—	—	—	—	—	—
56	Alexander Andrievsky	RW	1	0	0	0	0	0	—	—	—	—	—	—
42	Steve Bancroft‡	D	1	0	0	0	0	0	—	—	—	—	—	—
17	Rod Buskas	D	4	0	0	0	2	26	—	—	—	—	—	—
59	Sergei Krivokrasov	RW	4	0	0	0	−2	2	—	—	—	—	—	—
3	Craig Muni†	D	9	0	0	0	1	8	4	0	0	0	0	2
68	Stephen Tepper	RW	1	0	0	0	0	0	—	—	—	—	—	—
29	Jimmy Waite	G	20	0	0	0		0	—	—	—	—	—	—

=== Goaltending ===
No.	Player	Regular season										Playoffs								
No.	Player	GP	W	L	T	SA	GA	GAA	SV%	SO	TOI	GP	W	L	SA	GA	GAA	SV%	SO	TOI
30	Ed Belfour	71	41	18	11	1880	177	2.59	.906	7	4106	4	0	4	97	13	3.13	.866	0	249
29	Jimmy Waite	20	6	7	1	411	49	2.95	.881	2	996	—	—	—	—	—	—	—	—	—

== Awards and records ==
- Ed Belfour, Vezina Trophy

== Draft picks ==
Chicago's draft picks at the 1992 NHL entry draft held at the Montreal Forum in Montreal.

Round	#	Player	Nationality	College/Junior/Club team (League)
1	12	Sergei Krivokrasov	Russia	CSKA Moscow (Russia)
2	36	Jeff Shantz	Canada	Regina Pats (WHL)
2	41	Sergei Klimovich	Russia	Dynamo Moscow (Russia)
4	89	Andy MacIntyre	Canada	Saskatoon Blades (WHL)
5	113	Tim Hogan	Canada	University of Michigan (CCHA)
6	137	Gerry Skrypec	Canada	Ottawa 67's (OHL)
7	161	Mike Prokopec	Canada	Cornwall Royals (OHL)
8	185	Layne Roland	Canada	Portland Winter Hawks (WHL)
9	209	David Hymovitz	United States	Thayer Academy (USHS-MA)
10	233	Richard Raymond	Canada	Cornwall Royals (OHL)

== See also ==
- 1992–93 NHL season
