= 1992–93 Minnesota North Stars season =

National Hockey League team season

1992–93 Minnesota North Stars
- Division: 5th Norris
- Conference: 9th Campbell
- 1992–93 record: 36–38–10
- Home record: 18–17–7
- Road record: 18–21–3
- Goals for: 272
- Goals against: 293

Team information
- General manager: Bob Gainey
- Coach: Bob Gainey
- Captain: Mark Tinordi
- Alternate captains: Neal Broten; Mike Modano
- Arena: Met Center
- Average attendance: 13,910

Team leaders
- Goals: Russ Courtnall (36)
- Assists: Mike Modano (60)
- Points: Mike Modano (93)
- Penalty minutes: Shane Churla (286)
- Plus/minus: Derian Hatcher (+27)
- Wins: Jon Casey (26)
- Goals against average: Jon Casey (3.33)

The 1992–93 Minnesota North Stars season was the North Stars' 26th and final season of the franchise in Minnesota.

Although the team improved on its previous season and finished only two games below .500, it was only good enough in fifth place in the Norris Division. Minnesota finished three points behind St. Louis for the final playoff spot in the division. Four North Stars (Russ Courtnall, Ulf Dahlen, Dave Gagner and Mike Modano) reached the 30-goal plateau.

== Offseason ==
On June 8, general manager Bobby Clarke resigned in order to return to the Philadelphia Flyers as a senior vice president. Head coach Bob Gainey was named the team's new general manager.

== Regular season ==
Bobby Smith retired after the season.

=== Final standings ===
Norris Division
	GP	W	L	T	Pts	GF	GA
**Chicago Blackhawks**	84	47	25	12	**106**	279	230
**Detroit Red Wings**	84	47	28	9	**103**	369	280
**Toronto Maple Leafs**	84	44	29	11	**99**	288	241
**St. Louis Blues**	84	37	36	11	**85**	282	278
Minnesota North Stars	84	36	38	10	82	272	293
Tampa Bay Lightning	84	23	54	7	53	245	332

Note: GP = Games played, W = Wins, L = Losses, T = Ties, Pts = Points, GF = Goals for, GA = Goals against
Note: Teams that qualified for the playoffs are highlighted in bold.

== Schedule and results ==
1992–93 regular season
October: 6–5–1 (home: 3–1–1; road: 3–4–0)

Game	Date	Score	Opponent	Record	Recap
1	October 6, 1992	4–6	@ St. Louis Blues (1992–93)	0–1–0	L
2	October 8, 1992	5–2	St. Louis Blues (1992–93)	1–1–0	W
3	October 10, 1992	2–1	Tampa Bay Lightning (1992–93)	2–1–0	W
4	October 13, 1992	3–4	Calgary Flames (1992–93)	2–2–0	L
5	October 15, 1992	5–4	@ St. Louis Blues (1992–93)	3–2–0	W
6	October 17, 1992	1–8	@ Montreal Canadiens (1992–93)	3–3–0	L
7	October 18, 1992	5–1	@ Toronto Maple Leafs (1992–93)	4–3–0	W
8	October 22, 1992	5–2	Quebec Nordiques (1992–93)	5–3–0	W
9	October 24, 1992	5–5 OT	Los Angeles Kings (1992–93)	5–3–1	T
10	October 28, 1992	2–5	@ Edmonton Oilers (1992–93)	5–4–1	L
11	October 30, 1992	3–2	@ Vancouver Canucks (1992–93)	6–4–1	W
12	October 31, 1992	3–5	@ Calgary Flames (1992–93)	6–5–1	L

November: 7–4–2 (home: 3–3–2; road: 4–1–0)

Game	Date	Score	Opponent	Record	Recap
13	November 5, 1992	3–0	New York Islanders (1992–93)	7–5–1	W
14	November 7, 1992	2–2 OT	Edmonton Oilers (1992–93)	7–5–2	T
15	November 10, 1992	1–4	Pittsburgh Penguins (1992–93)	7–6–2	L
16	November 12, 1992	2–7	Winnipeg Jets (1992–93)	7–7–2	L
17	November 14, 1992	3–0	Chicago Blackhawks (1992–93)	8–7–2	W
18	November 15, 1992	1–2	@ Chicago Blackhawks (1992–93)	8–8–2	L
19	November 18, 1992	5–4	@ Washington Capitals (1992–93)	9–8–2	W
20	November 19, 1992	4–1	@ Tampa Bay Lightning (1992–93)	10–8–2	W
21	November 21, 1992	4–3	@ Buffalo Sabres (1992–93)	11–8–2	W
22	November 25, 1992	2–4	Vancouver Canucks (1992–93)	11–9–2	L
23	November 27, 1992	4–4 OT	New York Rangers (1992–93)	11–9–3	T
24	November 28, 1992	10–3	San Jose Sharks (1992–93)	12–9–3	W
25	November 30, 1992	4–2	@ New York Rangers (1992–93)	13–9–3	W

December: 6–4–2 (home: 3–2–2; road: 3–2–0)

Game	Date	Score	Opponent	Record	Recap
26	December 1, 1992	3–1	@ Ottawa Senators (1992–93)	14–9–3	W
27	December 3, 1992	4–2	@ Detroit Red Wings (1992–93)	15–9–3	W
28	December 5, 1992	7–4	@ Quebec Nordiques (1992–93)	16–9–3	W
29	December 10, 1992	2–3	Edmonton Oilers (1992–93)	16–10–3	L
30	December 12, 1992	0–3	Chicago Blackhawks (1992–93)	16–11–3	L
31	December 15, 1992	6–5	Toronto Maple Leafs (1992–93)	17–11–3	W
32	December 19, 1992	3–3 OT	Detroit Red Wings (1992–93)	17–11–4	T
33	December 20, 1992	0–4	@ Chicago Blackhawks (1992–93)	17–12–4	L
34	December 22, 1992	2–2 OT	St. Louis Blues (1992–93)	17–12–5	T
35	December 26, 1992	5–4	Winnipeg Jets (1992–93)	18–12–5	W
36	December 27, 1992	4–7	@ Winnipeg Jets (1992–93)	18–13–5	L
37	December 31, 1992	5–3	Boston Bruins (1992–93)	19–13–5	W

January: 7–5–3 (home: 4–2–1; road: 3–3–2)

Game	Date	Score	Opponent	Record	Recap
38	January 2, 1993	2–3	@ New York Islanders (1992–93)	19–14–5	L
39	January 3, 1993	6–6 OT	@ Hartford Whalers (1992–93)	19–14–6	T
40	January 6, 1993	1–5	@ New Jersey Devils (1992–93)	19–15–6	L
41	January 7, 1993	6–3	@ Pittsburgh Penguins (1992–93)	20–15–6	W
42	January 9, 1993	6–4	Tampa Bay Lightning (1992–93)	21–15–6	W
43	January 12, 1993	1–3	Chicago Blackhawks (1992–93)	21–16–6	L
44	January 14, 1993	1–3	@ Chicago Blackhawks (1992–93)	21–17–6	L
45	January 16, 1993	4–3	Calgary Flames (1992–93)	22–17–6	W
46	January 19, 1993	4–2	@ Tampa Bay Lightning (1992–93)	23–17–6	W
47	January 21, 1993	7–2	Ottawa Senators (1992–93)	24–17–6	W
48	January 23, 1993	3–3 OT	Vancouver Canucks (1992–93)	24–17–7	T
49	January 24, 1993	2–2 OT	@ Tampa Bay Lightning (1992–93)	24–17–8	T
50	January 26, 1993	2–1	@ Toronto Maple Leafs (1992–93)	25–17–8	W
51	January 28, 1993	4–2	New Jersey Devils (1992–93)	26–17–8	W
52	January 30, 1993	3–4	Tampa Bay Lightning (1992–93)	26–18–8	L

February: 4–7–1 (home: 1–3–0; road: 3–4–1)

Game	Date	Score	Opponent	Record	Recap
53	February 1, 1993	5–4	@ Vancouver Canucks (1992–93)	27–18–8	W
54	February 3, 1993	7–3	@ San Jose Sharks (1992–93)	28–18–8	W
55	February 9, 1993	2–3	Washington Capitals (1992–93)	28–19–8	L
56	February 11, 1993	1–0	@ Tampa Bay Lightning (1992–93)	29–19–8	W
57	February 13, 1993	1–6	@ Toronto Maple Leafs (1992–93)	29–20–8	L
58	February 14, 1993	5–6	Toronto Maple Leafs (1992–93)	29–21–8	L
59	February 17, 1993	5–10	Los Angeles Kings (1992–93)	29–22–8	L
60	February 20, 1993	5–2	Philadelphia Flyers (1992–93)	30–22–8	W
61	February 21, 1993	1–4	Detroit Red Wings (1992–93)	30–23–8	L
62	February 25, 1993	3–3 OT	@ Boston Bruins (1992–93)	30–23–9	T
63	February 27, 1993	2–3	@ St. Louis Blues (1992–93)	30–24–9	L
64	February 28, 1993	6–7	@ Winnipeg Jets (1992–93)	30–25–9	L

March: 3–9–1 (home: 2–4–1; road: 1–5–0)

Game	Date	Score	Opponent	Record	Recap
65	March 3, 1993	1–3	@ Toronto Maple Leafs (1992–93)	30–26–9	L
66	March 6, 1993	4–3	Montreal Canadiens (1992–93)	31–26–9	W
67	March 7, 1993	1–7	Detroit Red Wings (1992–93)	31–27–9	L
68	March 9, 1993	4–2	San Jose Sharks (1992–93)	32–27–9	W
69	March 11, 1993	4–3	@ Vancouver Canucks (1992–93)	33–27–9	W
70	March 13, 1993	2–6	@ St. Louis Blues (1992–93)	33–28–9	L
71	March 14, 1993	1–3	St. Louis Blues (1992–93)	33–29–9	L
72	March 16, 1993	3–4	@ Philadelphia Flyers (1992–93)	33–30–9	L
73	March 18, 1993	1–5	@ Detroit Red Wings (1992–93)	33–31–9	L
74	March 21, 1993	2–6	Detroit Red Wings (1992–93)	33–32–9	L
75	March 25, 1993	3–3 OT	Toronto Maple Leafs (1992–93)	33–32–10	T
76	March 27, 1993	1–2	Hartford Whalers (1992–93)	33–33–10	L
77	March 31, 1993	2–5	@ Edmonton Oilers (1992–93)	33–34–10	L

April: 3–4–0 (home: 2–1–0; road: 1–3–0)

Game	Date	Score	Opponent	Record	Recap
78	April 1, 1993	3–5	@ Calgary Flames (1992–93)	33–35–10	L
79	April 3, 1993	3–0	@ Los Angeles Kings (1992–93)	34–35–10	W
80	April 6, 1993	3–1	Buffalo Sabres (1992–93)	35–35–10	W
81	April 10, 1993	4–3	St. Louis Blues (1992–93)	36–35–10	W
82	April 11, 1993	1–5	@ St. Louis Blues (1992–93)	36–36–10	L
83	April 13, 1993	2–3	Chicago Blackhawks (1992–93)	36–37–10	L
84	April 15, 1993	3–5	@ Detroit Red Wings (1992–93)	36–38–10	L

**Legend**: W Win (2 points) L Loss (0 points) T Tie (1 point)

== Player statistics ==
=== Forwards ===
Note: GP = Games played; G = Goals; A = Assists; Pts = Points; PIM = Penalty minutes

Player	GP	G	A	Pts	PIM	+/-
Mike Modano	82	33	60	93	83	7
Russ Courtnall	84	36	43	79	49	1
Dave Gagner	84	33	43	76	143	13
Ulf Dahlen	83	35	39	74	6	20
Mike McPhee	84	18	22	40	44	2
Mike Craig	70	15	23	38	106	-11
Neal Broten	82	12	21	33	22	7
Todd Elik	46	13	18	31	48	5
Gaetan Duchesne	84	16	13	29	30	6
Trent Klatt	47	4	19	23	38	2
Shane Churla	73	5	16	21	286	8
Stewart Gavin	63	10	8	18	59	4
Bobby Smith	45	5	7	12	10	9
Brian Propp	17	3	3	16	0	10
Dan Quinn	11	0	4	4	6	4

=== Defensemen ===
Note: GP = Games played; G = Goals; A = Assists; Pts = Points; PIM = Penalty minutes

Player	GP	G	A	Pts	PIM	+/-
Mark Tinordi	69	15	27	42	157	1
Tommy Sjodin	77	7	29	36	30	25
Jim Johnson	79	3	20	23	105	9
Derian Hatcher	67	4	15	19	178	27
Craig Ludwig	78	1	10	11	153	1
Richard Matvichuk	53	2	3	5	26	8
James Black	10	2	1	3	4	0
Brad Berry	63	0	3	3	109	2

=== Goaltending ===
Note: GP = Games played; W = Wins; L = Losses; T = Ties; SO = Shutouts; GAA = Goals against average

Player	GP	MIN	W	L	T	SO	GAA
Jon Casey	60	3476	26	26	5	3	3.33
Darcy Wakaluk	29	1596	10	12	5	1	3.65

== Relocation to Dallas ==
In 1993, amid further attendance woes and bitter personal controversy, North Stars owner Norm Green obtained permission to move the team to the Reunion Arena in Dallas, Texas, where they were renamed, 'specifically', the Stars. The NHL, to quell the controversy, 'promised' to the fans of Minnesota to return in the future with a new franchise. That promise came true when the franchise was awarded in 1997 and began play in 2000.

== Draft picks ==
Dallas' draft picks at the 1992 NHL entry draft held at the Montreal Forum in Montreal.

Round	Pick	Player	Nationality	College/Junior/Club team (League)
2	34	Jarkko Varvio	Finland	HPK (Finland)
3	58	Jeff Bes	Canada	Guelph Storm (OHL)
4	88	Jere Lehtinen	Finland	Kiekko-Espoo (Finland)
6	130	Michael Johnson	Canada	Ottawa 67's (OHL)
7	154	Kyle Peterson	Canada	Thunder Bay Flyers (USHL)
8	178	Juha Lind	Finland	Jokerit (Finland)
9	202	Lars Edstrom	Sweden	Lulea HF (Sweden)
10	226	Jeff Romfo	United States	Blaine High School (USHS-MN)
11	250	Jeff Moen	United States	Roseville Area High School (USHS-MN)
