= 1992–93 Washington Capitals season =

NHL hockey team season

1992–93 Washington Capitals
- Division: 2nd Patrick
- Conference: 5th Wales
- 1992–93 record: 43–34–7
- Home record: 21–15–6
- Road record: 22–19–1
- Goals for: 325
- Goals against: 286

Team information
- General manager: David Poile
- Coach: Terry Murray
- Captain: Rod Langway (Oct.–Nov.); Kevin Hatcher (Nov.–Apr.)
- Alternate captains: Kevin Hatcher (Oct.–Nov.); Dale Hunter; Kelly Miller
- Arena: Capital Centre
- Average attendance: 15,540

Team leaders
- Goals: Peter Bondra (37)
- Assists: Dale Hunter (59)
- Points: Peter Bondra (85)
- Penalty minutes: Alan May (268)
- Plus/minus: Dmitri Khristich (+29)
- Wins: Don Beaupre (27)
- Goals against average: Rick Tabaracci (1.75)

The 1992–93 Washington Capitals season was the Capitals' 19th season of competition.

== Regular season ==
During the regular season, the Caps set a club record with nine 20-goal scorers, three of whom were defensemen (Sylvain Cote, Kevin Hatcher and Al Iafrate).

Washington tied the Boston Bruins and the New York Islanders for the fewest short-handed goals allowed, with just 8.

On Friday, November 13, 1992, the Caps lost on the road to the New Jersey Devils by a score of 3-0. It was the first time the Caps had been shut out in a regular-season game since Sunday, October 29, 1989, when they lost on the road to the Chicago Blackhawks by a score of 1-0. Prior to their loss to the Devils, the Caps had gone 245 consecutive regular-season games without being shut out.

=== Final standings ===
Patrick Division
	GP	W	L	T	Pts	GF	GA
**Pittsburgh Penguins**	84	56	21	7	**119**	367	268
**Washington Capitals**	84	43	34	7	**93**	325	286
**New York Islanders**	84	40	37	7	**87**	335	297
**New Jersey Devils**	84	40	37	7	**87**	308	299
Philadelphia Flyers	84	36	37	11	83	319	319
New York Rangers	84	34	39	11	79	304	308

Note: GP = Games played, W = Wins, L = Losses, T = Ties, Pts = Points, GF = Goals for, GA = Goals against
Note: Teams that qualified for the playoffs are highlighted in bold.

Wales Conference
R		Div	GP	W	L	T	GF	GA	Pts
**1**	**p – Pittsburgh Penguins**	**PTK**	**84**	**56**	**21**	**7**	**367**	**268**	**119**
**2**	**Boston Bruins**	**ADM**	**84**	**51**	**26**	**7**	**332**	**268**	**109**
**3**	**Quebec Nordiques**	**ADM**	**84**	**47**	**27**	**10**	**351**	**300**	**104**
**4**	**Montreal Canadiens**	**ADM**	**84**	**48**	**30**	**6**	**326**	**280**	**102**
**5**	**Washington Capitals**	**PTK**	**84**	**43**	**34**	**7**	**325**	**286**	**93**
**6**	**New York Islanders**	**PTK**	**84**	**40**	**37**	**7**	**335**	**297**	**87**
**7**	**New Jersey Devils**	**PTK**	**84**	**40**	**37**	**7**	**308**	**299**	**87**
**8**	**Buffalo Sabres**	**ADM**	**84**	**38**	**36**	**10**	**335**	**297**	**86**
9	Philadelphia Flyers	PTK	84	36	37	11	319	319	83
10	New York Rangers	PTK	84	34	39	11	304	308	79
11	Hartford Whalers	ADM	84	26	52	6	284	369	58
12	Ottawa Senators	ADM	84	10	70	4	202	395	24

p – Won Presidents' Trophy (and division)
Divisions: PTK – Patrick, ADM – Adams
bold – Qualified for playoffs

== Schedule and results ==
=== Regular season ===
1992–93 regular season
October: 4–8–0 (home: 2–3–0; road: 2–5–0)

Game	Date	Score	Opponent	Record	Recap
1	October 6, 1992	6–5	@ Toronto Maple Leafs (1992–93)	1–0–0	W
2	October 9, 1992	2–4	New York Rangers (1992–93)	1–1–0	L
3	October 10, 1992	2–4	Philadelphia Flyers (1992–93)	1–2–0	L
4	October 12, 1992	2–4	@ New Jersey Devils (1992–93)	1–3–0	L
5	October 16, 1992	5–1	Ottawa Senators (1992–93)	2–3–0	W
6	October 17, 1992	6–4	Buffalo Sabres (1992–93)	3–3–0	W
7	October 21, 1992	1–2	@ New York Rangers (1992–93)	3–4–0	L
8	October 23, 1992	2–5	New York Islanders (1992–93)	3–5–0	L
9	October 26, 1992	2–6	@ Winnipeg Jets (1992–93)	3–6–0	L
10	October 28, 1992	3–4	@ Vancouver Canucks (1992–93)	3–7–0	L
11	October 30, 1992	3–1	@ Calgary Flames (1992–93)	4–7–0	W
12	October 31, 1992	2–4	@ Edmonton Oilers (1992–93)	4–8–0	L

November: 7–5–2 (home: 3–3–1; road: 4–2–1)

Game	Date	Score	Opponent	Record	Recap
13	November 3, 1992	4–1	Chicago Blackhawks (1992–93)	5–8–0	W
14	November 6, 1992	2–2 OT	Tampa Bay Lightning (1992–93)	5–8–1	T
15	November 7, 1992	6–2	@ Hartford Whalers (1992–93)	6–8–1	W
16	November 11, 1992	7–4	@ New York Rangers (1992–93)	7–8–1	W
17	November 13, 1992	0–3	@ New Jersey Devils (1992–93)	7–9–1	L
18	November 14, 1992	3–4 OT	New Jersey Devils (1992–93)	7–10–1	L
19	November 18, 1992	4–5	Minnesota North Stars (1992–93)	7–11–1	L
20	November 20, 1992	5–7	Detroit Red Wings (1992–93)	7–12–1	L
21	November 22, 1992	6–4	@ Quebec Nordiques (1992–93)	8–12–1	W
22	November 23, 1992	1–1 OT	@ Montreal Canadiens (1992–93)	8–12–2	T
23	November 25, 1992	6–2	Boston Bruins (1992–93)	9–12–2	W
24	November 27, 1992	6–4	Pittsburgh Penguins (1992–93)	10–12–2	W
25	November 28, 1992	3–5	@ Pittsburgh Penguins (1992–93)	10–13–2	L
26	November 30, 1992	4–1	@ Detroit Red Wings (1992–93)	11–13–2	W

December: 9–3–1 (home: 4–0–1; road: 5–3–0)

Game	Date	Score	Opponent	Record	Recap
27	December 4, 1992	8–4	New York Rangers (1992–93)	12–13–2	W
28	December 5, 1992	5–3	@ New York Islanders (1992–93)	13–13–2	W
29	December 7, 1992	6–5	@ Ottawa Senators (1992–93)	14–13–2	W
30	December 9, 1992	6–2	@ New Jersey Devils (1992–93)	15–13–2	W
31	December 11, 1992	8–6	Winnipeg Jets (1992–93)	16–13–2	W
32	December 12, 1992	5–2	@ Philadelphia Flyers (1992–93)	17–13–2	W
33	December 16, 1992	3–6	@ Hartford Whalers (1992–93)	17–14–2	L
34	December 18, 1992	4–3	Hartford Whalers (1992–93)	18–14–2	W
35	December 19, 1992	3–4	@ Boston Bruins (1992–93)	18–15–2	L
36	December 21, 1992	4–3	@ Ottawa Senators (1992–93)	19–15–2	W
37	December 23, 1992	1–4	@ Buffalo Sabres (1992–93)	19–16–2	L
38	December 26, 1992	5–5 OT	Philadelphia Flyers (1992–93)	19–16–3	T
39	December 29, 1992	4–3 OT	New York Rangers (1992–93)	20–16–3	W

January: 5–5–3 (home: 3–0–3; road: 2–5–0)

Game	Date	Score	Opponent	Record	Recap
40	January 1, 1993	9–2	New Jersey Devils (1992–93)	21–16–3	W
41	January 2, 1993	2–2 OT	Chicago Blackhawks (1992–93)	21–16–4	T
42	January 7, 1993	2–8	@ Philadelphia Flyers (1992–93)	21–17–4	L
43	January 9, 1993	4–3	Edmonton Oilers (1992–93)	22–17–4	W
44	January 13, 1993	4–5	@ New York Rangers (1992–93)	22–18–4	L
45	January 14, 1993	3–0	@ New York Islanders (1992–93)	23–18–4	W
46	January 17, 1993	5–3	@ Tampa Bay Lightning (1992–93)	24–18–4	W
47	January 21, 1993	2–6	@ Chicago Blackhawks (1992–93)	24–19–4	L
48	January 23, 1993	6–4	Ottawa Senators (1992–93)	25–19–4	W
49	January 26, 1993	3–6	@ Pittsburgh Penguins (1992–93)	25–20–4	L
50	January 27, 1993	3–4	@ Buffalo Sabres (1992–93)	25–21–4	L
51	January 29, 1993	3–3 OT	Quebec Nordiques (1992–93)	25–21–5	T
52	January 31, 1993	2–2 OT	Pittsburgh Penguins (1992–93)	25–21–6	T

February: 7–3–0 (home: 2–2–0; road: 5–1–0)

Game	Date	Score	Opponent	Record	Recap
53	February 2, 1993	4–6	Calgary Flames (1992–93)	25–22–6	L
54	February 9, 1993	3–2	@ Minnesota North Stars (1992–93)	26–22–6	W
55	February 11, 1993	10–6	@ St. Louis Blues (1992–93)	27–22–6	W
56	February 13, 1993	10–3	@ Los Angeles Kings (1992–93)	28–22–6	W
57	February 16, 1993	4–3	@ San Jose Sharks (1992–93)	29–22–6	W
58	February 20, 1993	7–3	Los Angeles Kings (1992–93)	30–22–6	W
59	February 21, 1993	5–2	St. Louis Blues (1992–93)	31–22–6	W
60	February 23, 1993	4–2	@ New York Islanders (1992–93)	32–22–6	W
61	February 27, 1993	4–5 OT	@ Boston Bruins (1992–93)	32–23–6	L
62	February 28, 1993	2–4	Pittsburgh Penguins (1992–93)	32–24–6	L

March: 7–6–1 (home: 5–4–1; road: 2–2–0)

Game	Date	Score	Opponent	Record	Recap
63	March 2, 1993	3–3 OT	Vancouver Canucks (1992–93)	32–24–7	T
64	March 5, 1993	0–3	Philadelphia Flyers (1992–93)	32–25–7	L
65	March 7, 1993	2–3	New York Islanders (1992–93)	32–26–7	L
66	March 9, 1993	3–1	Toronto Maple Leafs (1992–93)	33–26–7	W
67	March 11, 1993	4–6	@ Philadelphia Flyers (1992–93)	33–27–7	L
68	March 16, 1993	4–2	@ Detroit Red Wings (1992–93)	34–27–7	W
69	March 18, 1993	5–7	@ Pittsburgh Penguins (1992–93)	34–28–7	L
70	March 19, 1993	5–2	Hartford Whalers (1992–93)	35–28–7	W
71	March 21, 1993	5–3	San Jose Sharks (1992–93)	36–28–7	W
72	March 23, 1993	5–1	Quebec Nordiques (1992–93)	37–28–7	W
73	March 25, 1993	5–2	@ New York Islanders (1992–93)	38–28–7	W
74	March 27, 1993	2–5	New Jersey Devils (1992–93)	38–29–7	L
75	March 28, 1993	1–4	Pittsburgh Penguins (1992–93)	38–30–7	L
76	March 30, 1993	4–1	Buffalo Sabres (1992–93)	39–30–7	W

April: 4–4–0 (home: 2–3–0; road: 2–1–0)

Game	Date	Score	Opponent	Record	Recap
77	April 2, 1993	4–0	Montreal Canadiens (1992–93)	40–30–7	W
78	April 4, 1993	0–4	New York Rangers (1992–93)	40–31–7	L
79	April 6, 1993	2–3	New York Islanders (1992–93)	40–32–7	L
80	April 8, 1993	3–4	@ Philadelphia Flyers (1992–93)	40–33–7	L
81	April 10, 1993	3–5	New Jersey Devils (1992–93)	40–34–7	L
82	April 12, 1993	3–2 OT	@ Montreal Canadiens (1992–93)	41–34–7	W
83	April 14, 1993	2–0	@ New York Rangers (1992–93)	42–34–7	W
84	April 16, 1993	4–2	New York Rangers (1992–93)	43–34–7	W

Legend: W Win (2 points) L Loss (0 points) T Tie (1 point)

=== Playoffs ===
1993 Stanley Cup playoffs
Patrick Division Semifinals vs. (P3) New York Islanders – Islanders win 4–2

Game	Date	Score	Opponent	Series	Recap
1	April 18, 1993	3–1	New York Islanders	Capitals lead 1–0	W
2	April 20, 1993	4–5 2OT	New York Islanders	Series tied 1–1	L
3	April 22, 1993	3–4 OT	@ New York Islanders	Islanders lead 2–1	L
4	April 24, 1993	3–4 2OT	@ New York Islanders	Islanders lead 3–1	L
5	April 26, 1993	6–4	New York Islanders	Islanders lead 3–2	W
6	April 28, 1993	3–5	@ New York Islanders	Islanders win 4–2	L

Legend: W Win L Loss

== Player statistics ==
=== Regular season ===
Scoring

Player	Pos	GP	G	A	Pts	PIM	+/-	PPG	SHG	GWG
Peter Bondra	RW	83	37	48	85	70	8	10	0	7
Mike Ridley	C	84	26	56	82	44	5	6	2	3
Kevin Hatcher	D	83	34	45	79	114	-7	13	1	6
Dale Hunter	C	84	20	59	79	198	3	10	0	2
Michal Pivonka	C	69	21	53	74	66	14	6	1	5
Dmitri Khristich	LW/C	64	31	35	66	28	29	9	1	1
Al Iafrate	D	81	25	41	66	169	15	11	1	4
Pat Elynuik	RW	80	22	35	57	66	3	8	0	1
Sylvain Cote	D	77	21	29	50	34	28	8	2	3
Kelly Miller	LW	84	18	27	45	32	-2	3	0	3
Calle Johansson	D	77	7	38	45	56	3	6	0	0
Bobby Carpenter	C	68	11	17	28	65	-16	2	0	0
Keith Jones	RW	71	12	14	26	124	18	0	0	3
Todd Krygier	LW	77	11	12	23	60	-13	0	2	0
Paul MacDermid	RW	72	9	8	17	80	-13	1	0	3
Alan May	RW	83	6	10	16	268	1	0	0	1
Paul Cavallini	D	71	5	8	13	46	3	0	0	0
Steve Konowalchuk	LW	36	4	7	11	16	4	1	0	1
Shawn Anderson	D	60	2	6	8	18	-2	1	0	0
Reggie Savage	C	16	2	3	5	12	-4	2	0	0
Jim Hrivnak	G	27	0	3	3	0	0	0	0	0
Kevin Miller	C	10	0	3	3	35	-4	0	0	0
Jeff Greenlaw	LW	16	1	1	2	18	-3	0	0	0
Jason Woolley	D	26	0	2	2	10	3	0	0	0
Don Beaupre	G	58	0	1	1	20	0	0	0	0
Brad Schlegel	D	7	0	1	1	6	1	0	0	0
Bobby Babcock	D	1	0	0	0	2	0	0	0	0
Randy Burridge	LW	4	0	0	0	0	1	0	0	0
Byron Dafoe	G	1	0	0	0	0	0	0	0	0
Mark Hunter	RW	7	0	0	0	14	1	0	0	0
Olaf Kolzig	G	1	0	0	0	0	0	0	0	0
Rod Langway	D	21	0	0	0	20	-13	0	0	0
Rick Tabaracci	G	6	0	0	0	4	0	0	0	0

Goaltending

Player	MIN	GP	W	L	T	GA	GAA	SO	SA	SV	SV%
Don Beaupre	3282	58	27	23	5	181	3.31	1	1530	1349	.882
Jim Hrivnak	1421	27	13	9	2	83	3.50	0	677	594	.877
Rick Tabaracci	343	6	3	2	0	10	1.75	2	162	152	.938
Byron Dafoe	1	1	0	0	0	0	0.00	0	0	0	
Olaf Kolzig	20	1	0	0	0	2	6.00	0	7	5	.714
Team:	5067	84	43	34	7	276	3.27	3	2376	2100	.884

=== Playoffs ===
Scoring

Player	Pos	GP	G	A	Pts	PIM	PPG	SHG	GWG
Dale Hunter	C	6	7	1	8	35	4	0	1
Dmitri Khristich	LW/C	6	2	5	7	2	1	0	0
Al Iafrate	D	6	6	0	6	4	3	0	1
Mike Ridley	C	6	1	5	6	0	1	0	0
Peter Bondra	RW	6	0	6	6	0	0	0	0
Pat Elynuik	RW	6	2	3	5	19	0	0	0
Bobby Carpenter	C	6	1	4	5	6	0	0	0
Calle Johansson	D	6	0	5	5	4	0	0	0
Kelly Miller	LW	6	0	3	3	2	0	0	0
Sylvain Cote	D	6	1	1	2	4	0	0	0
Todd Krygier	LW	6	1	1	2	4	0	1	0
Paul Cavallini	D	6	0	2	2	18	0	0	0
Michal Pivonka	C	6	0	2	2	0	0	0	0
Randy Burridge	LW	4	1	0	1	0	0	0	0
Kevin Hatcher	D	6	0	1	1	14	0	0	0
Steve Konowalchuk	LW	2	0	1	1	0	0	0	0
Alan May	RW	6	0	1	1	6	0	0	0
Shawn Anderson	D	6	0	0	0	0	0	0	0
Don Beaupre	G	2	0	0	0	0	0	0	0
Reggie Savage	C	2	0	0	0	0	0	0	0
Keith Jones	RW	6	0	0	0	10	0	0	0
Rick Tabaracci	G	4	0	0	0	4	0	0	0

Goaltending

Player	MIN	GP	W	L	GA	GAA	SO	SA	SV	SV%
Don Beaupre	119	2	1	1	9	4.54	0	65	56	.862
Rick Tabaracci	304	4	1	3	14	2.76	0	160	146	.913
Team:	423	6	2	4	23	3.26	0	225	202	.898

Note: GP = Games played; G = Goals; A = Assists; Pts = Points; +/- = Plus/minus; PIM = Penalty minutes; PPG=Power-play goals; SHG=Short-handed goals; GWG=Game-winning goals
MIN=Minutes played; W = Wins; L = Losses; T = Ties; GA = Goals against; GAA = Goals against average; SO = Shutouts; SA=Shots against; SV=Shots saved; SV% = Save percentage;

== Draft picks ==
Washington's draft picks at the 1992 NHL entry draft held at the Montreal Forum in Montreal, Quebec.

Round	#	Player	Nationality	College/Junior/Club team (League)
1	14	Sergei Gonchar	Russia	Traktor Chelyabinsk (Russia)
2	32	Jim Carey	United States	Catholic Memorial School (USHS-MA)
3	53	Stefan Ustorf	Germany	ESV Kaufbeuren (Germany)
3	71	Martin Gendron	Canada	Saint-Hyacinthe Laser (QMJHL)
5	119	John Varga	United States	Tacoma Rockets (WHL)
7	167	Mark Matier	Canada	Sault Ste. Marie Greyhounds (OHL)
8	191	Mike Mathers	Canada	Kamloops Blazers (WHL)
9	215	Brian Stagg	Canada	Kingston Frontenacs (OHL)
10	239	Greg Callahan	United States	Belmont Hill High School (USHS-MA)
11	263	B. J. MacPherson	Canada	Oshawa Generals (OHL)

== See also ==
- 1992–93 NHL season
