= Vitali Prokhorov =

Russian ice hockey player (born 1966)

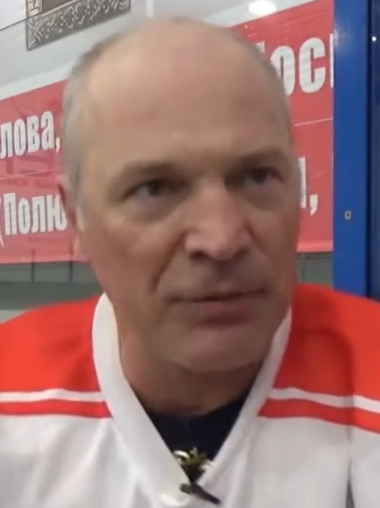
- Prokhorov in 2017
- Born: December 25, 1966 (age 59) Moscow, Soviet Union
- Height: 5 ft 9 in (175 cm)
- Weight: 185 lb (84 kg; 13 st 3 lb)
- Position: Left wing
- Shot: Left
- Played for: Spartak Moscow; St. Louis Blues; Färjestads BK; HC Davos; CSKA Moscow; Ak Bars Kazan; Metallurg Magnitogorsk; Lada Togliatti; Vityaz Podolsk; Khimik Voskresensk
- National team: Soviet Union, Unified Team and Russia
- NHL draft: 64th overall, 1992; St. Louis Blues
- Playing career: 1983–2002

Vitali Vladimirovich Prokhorov (Russian: Виталий Владимирович Прохоров); born December 25, 1966, in Moscow, Soviet Union) is a retired professional hockey player who played briefly with the St. Louis Blues in the NHL. He played left wing and shot left-handed.

== Career ==
Prokhorov began his playing career in his native USSR. He played for Spartak Moscow for 9 seasons from 1983 until 1992. He also played for the USSR in the 1991 Canada Cup and for Russia in the 1992 Winter Olympics and the 1992 Ice Hockey World Championship. Following the breakup of the Soviet Union many Russian players attempted to come to North America to play in the NHL. Prokhorov was no exception, and he was drafted by the St. Louis Blues in the 3rd round, 64th overall in the 1992 NHL entry draft. He along with Vitali Karamnov and Igor Korolev created a "Moscow Express Line" that was expected to bring a big scoring punch to the Blues.

For the 1992–1993 season however things did not go well for Prokhorov. After a slow start, Prokhorov suffered a shoulder injury that limited him to only 26 games the whole year. He did have a bright spot during the season however when he scored a hat trick against the Philadelphia Flyers on October 31, 1992. After starting the 1993–1994 season with the Peoria Rivermen Prokhorov played 55 games with the Blues, scoring 25 points. The following season Prokhorov played 20 games with the Rivermen and only 2 games with the Blues before being released.

Following his stint in the NHL Prokhorov played the 1995–1996 season in Sweden and 4 more seasons in Russia before retiring from hockey in 2001.

== Career statistics ==
=== Regular season and playoffs ===
			Regular season					Playoffs
Season	Team	League	GP	G	A	Pts	PIM	GP	G	A	Pts	PIM
1983–84	Spartak Moscow	USSR	5	0	0	0	0	—	—	—	—	—
1984–85	Spartak Moscow	USSR	31	1	1	2	10	—	—	—	—	—
1985–86	Spartak Moscow	USSR	29	3	9	12	4	—	—	—	—	—
1986–87	Spartak Moscow	USSR	27	1	6	7	2	—	—	—	—	—
1987–88	Spartak Moscow	USSR	19	5	0	5	4	—	—	—	—	—
1987–88	Kristall Elektrostal	USSR II	16	3	3	6	4	—	—	—	—	—
1988–89	Spartak Moscow	USSR	37	11	5	16	10	—	—	—	—	—
1988–89	Traktor Lipetsk	USSR III	2	2	1	3	2	—	—	—	—	—
1989–90	Spartak Moscow	USSR	43	13	8	21	35	—	—	—	—	—
1990–91	Spartak Moscow	USSR	43	21	10	31	29	—	—	—	—	—
1991–92	Spartak Moscow	CIS	32	12	16	28	54	6	1	3	4	14
1992–93	St. Louis Blues	NHL	26	4	1	5	15	—	—	—	—	—
1993–94	St. Louis Blues	NHL	55	15	10	25	20	4	0	0	0	0
1993–94	Peoria Rivermen	IHL	19	13	10	23	16	—	—	—	—	—
1994–95	Spartak Moscow	IHL	8	1	4	5	8	—	—	—	—	—
1994–95	St. Louis Blues	NHL	2	0	0	0	0	—	—	—	—	—
1994–95	Peoria Rivermen	IHL	20	6	3	9	6	9	4	7	11	6
1995–96	Färjestads BK	SEL	37	7	11	18	61	8	2	0	2	31
1996–97	Standart Mendeleyevo	RUS IV	11	12	—	—	—	—	—	—	—	—
1997–98	Spartak Moscow	RSL	46	21	14	35	92	4	2	1	3	12
1998–99	HC Davos	NDA	3	0	1	1	2	—	—	—	—	—
1998–99	CSKA Moscow	RSL	12	5	5	10	22	—	—	—	—	—
1998–99	Ak Bars Kazan	RSL	16	2	4	6	8	9	2	1	3	29
1999–2000	Metallurg Magnitogorsk	RSL	20	8	11	19	8	12	5	4	9	2
2000–01	Lada Togliatti	RSL	14	2	4	6	8	—	—	—	—	—
2000–01	Vityaz Podolsk	RSL	24	5	9	14	52	—	—	—	—	—
2001–02	Khimik Voskresensk	RUS II	32	10	8	18	30	—	—	—	—	—
USSR/CIS totals			266	67	55	122	148	6	1	3	4	14
NHL totals			83	19	11	30	35	4	0	0	0	0
RSL totals			132	43	47	90	190	28	9	6	15	43

=== International ===
Year	Team	Event	Result	GP	G	A	Pts	PIM
1991	Soviet Union	CC	5th	5	1	2	3	4
1992	Unified Team	OG	1st place, gold medalist(s)	8	2	4	6	6
1992	Russia	WC	5th	6	0	3	3	4
1998	Russia	WC	5th	6	0	1	1	0
Senior totals				25	3	10	13	14
