= Vitali Karamnov =

Russian ice hockey player

- Born: July 6, 1968 (age 57) Moscow, Russian SFSR, URS
- Height: 6 ft 2 in (188 cm)
- Weight: 185 lb (84 kg; 13 st 3 lb)
- Position: Left wing
- Shot: Left
- Played for: HC Dynamo Moscow; Torpedo Yaroslavl; St. Louis Blues; JYP; Krefeld Pinguine; HC Vsetin; Vityaz Podolsk; Salavat Yulaev Ufa; HC Spartak Moscow
- National team: Russia
- NHL draft: 62nd overall, 1992; St. Louis Blues
- Playing career: 1986–2004

Vitali Vladimirovich Karamnov (Russian: Виталий Владимирович Карамнов; born July 6, 1968) is a Russian retired professional ice hockey player. He played 92 games in the National Hockey League with the St. Louis Blues from 1992 to 1993. The rest of his career, which lasted from 1986 to 2004, was mainly spent in European leagues. He played left wing and shot left-handed.

== Biography ==
Karamnov began his playing career in his native USSR. He played 6 years in the USSR before jumping to the NHL after the breakup of the Soviet Union. He was drafted by the St. Louis Blues in the 3rd round, 62nd overall (two spots ahead of fellow Russian and Blues teammate Vitali Prokhorov) in the 1992 NHL entry draft.

For the 1992–1993 season, Karamnov spent the majority of the year with the Blues minor league affiliate Peoria Rivermen while also playing 7 games with the Blues that season as well. For the 1993–1994 season Karamnov skated in 59 games and scored 21 points, both NHL career highs. The following season would be the last for Karamnov in the NHL, playing 15 games with Rivermen and 26 games with the Blues.

Following his stint in the NHL Karamnov played in a number of different settings around the world. He played the 1995–1996 season in Finland, followed by 3 season in the DEL in Germany, a brief 5 game stint in the Czech Republic during the 1999–2000 season, and 3 more seasons in Russia. Karamnov retired from hockey in 2003.

== Career statistics ==
=== Regular season and playoffs ===
			Regular season					Playoffs
Season	Team	League	GP	G	A	Pts	PIM	GP	G	A	Pts	PIM
1986–87	HC Dynamo Moscow	USSR	4	0	0	0	0	—	—	—	—	—
1987–88	HC Dynamo Moscow	USSR	2	0	1	1	0	—	—	—	—	—
1987–88	HC Dynamo Kharkov	USSR-2	50	10	8	18	12	—	—	—	—	—
1988–89	HC Dynamo Kharkov	USSR	23	4	1	5	19	—	—	—	—	—
1989–90	Torpedo Yaroslavl	USSR	47	6	7	13	32	—	—	—	—	—
1990–91	Torpedo Yaroslavl	USSR	45	14	7	21	30	—	—	—	—	—
1991–92	HC Dynamo Moscow	CIS	40	13	19	32	25	—	—	—	—	—
1992–93	St. Louis Blues	NHL	7	0	1	1	0	—	—	—	—	—
1992–93	Peoria Rivermen	IHL	23	8	12	20	47	—	—	—	—	—
1993–94	St. Louis Blues	NHL	59	9	12	21	51	—	—	—	—	—
1993–94	Peoria Rivermen	IHL	3	0	1	1	2	1	0	1	1	0
1994–95	St. Louis Blues	NHL	26	3	7	10	14	2	0	0	0	2
1994–95	Peoria Rivermen	IHL	15	6	9	15	7	—	—	—	—	—
1995–96	JYP	FIN	24	8	7	15	36	—	—	—	—	—
1996–97	Berlin Capitals	DEL	4	2	1	3	27	—	—	—	—	—
1996–97	Krefeld Pinguine	DEL	28	7	13	20	80	3	1	1	2	25
1997–98	Krefeld Pinguine	DEL	34	8	15	23	40	3	0	2	2	2
1998–99	Krefeld Pinguine	DEL	40	11	17	28	61	2	1	0	1	4
1999–00	HC Vsetin	CZE	5	0	0	0	10	—	—	—	—	—
2000–01	Vityaz Podolsk	RSL	15	3	3	6	12	—	—	—	—	—
2001–02	Salavat Yulaev Ufa	RSL	51	16	9	26	72	—	—	—	—	—
2002–03	Salavat Yulaev Ufa	RSL	35	7	3	10	55	1	0	0	0	0
2003–04	HC Spartak Moscow	RUS-2	5	1	0	1	4	—	—	—	—	—
NHL totals			92	12	20	32	65	2	0	0	0	2

=== International ===
Year	Team	Event	GP	G	A	Pts	PIM
1996	Russia	WC	8	0	2	2	0
Senior totals			8	0	2	2	0
