= 1992–93 Detroit Red Wings season =

Sports season

1992–93 Detroit Red Wings
- Division: 2nd Norris
- Conference: 2nd Campbell
- 1992–93 record: 47–28–9
- Home record: 25–14–3
- Road record: 22–14–6
- Goals for: 369
- Goals against: 280

Team information
- General manager: Bryan Murray
- Coach: Bryan Murray
- Captain: Steve Yzerman
- Alternate captains: Gerard Gallant; Bob Probert
- Arena: Joe Louis Arena
- Average attendance: 19,707

Team leaders
- Goals: Steve Yzerman (58)
- Assists: Steve Yzerman (79)
- Points: Steve Yzerman (137)
- Penalty minutes: Bob Probert (292)
- Plus/minus: Steve Yzerman (+33); Sergei Fedorov (+33)
- Wins: Tim Cheveldae (34)
- Goals against average: Vincent Riendeau (3.22)

The 1992–93 Detroit Red Wings season was the Red Wings' 61st season, the franchise's 67th. During the 1992–93 season, the Red Wings qualified for the NHL playoffs for the third consecutive season, where they lost their first round series against Toronto in seven games.

== Regular season ==
In addition to leading all teams with most goals scored during the regular season (369), the Red Wings also scored the most power-play goals (113) and had the best power-play conversion percentage (24.89%). For the second consecutive season, five players reached 30-goals or more.

=== Season standings ===
Norris Division
| | GP | W | L | T | Pts | GF | GA |
|---|---|---|---|---|---|---|---|
| **Chicago Blackhawks** | 84 | 47 | 25 | 12 | **106** | 279 | 230 |
| **Detroit Red Wings** | 84 | 47 | 28 | 9 | **103** | 369 | 280 |
| **Toronto Maple Leafs** | 84 | 44 | 29 | 11 | **99** | 288 | 241 |
| **St. Louis Blues** | 84 | 37 | 36 | 11 | **85** | 282 | 278 |
| Minnesota North Stars | 84 | 36 | 38 | 10 | 82 | 272 | 293 |
| Tampa Bay Lightning | 84 | 23 | 54 | 7 | 53 | 245 | 332 |

Note: GP = Games played, W = Wins, L = Losses, T = Ties, Pts = Points, GF = Goals for, GA = Goals against
Note: Teams that qualified for the playoffs are highlighted in bold.

== Playoffs ==
In the Norris Division Semifinals series against the Toronto Maple Leafs, the Red Wings outscored the Leafs 30–24 through seven games but lost the deciding game in overtime on Nikolai Borschevsky's famous deflection goal. It was the second overtime loss for Detroit (both came at Joe Louis Arena) in the series.

== Schedule and results ==
=== Regular season ===
1992–93 regular season
October: 7–5–0 (home: 4–1–0; road: 3–4–0)

| Game | Date | Visitor | Score | Home | OT | Record | Points | Recap |
|---|---|---|---|---|---|---|---|---|
| 1 | October 6 | Detroit | 1 – 4 | Winnipeg | | 0–1–0 | 0 | L |
| 2 | October 8 | Detroit | 5 – 3 | Los Angeles | | 1–1–0 | 2 | W |
| 3 | October 10 | Detroit | 6 – 3 | San Jose | | 2–1–0 | 4 | W |
| 4 | October 15 | Quebec | 4 – 2 | Detroit | | 2–2–0 | 4 | L |
| 5 | October 17 | Edmonton | 2 – 4 | Detroit | | 3–2–0 | 6 | W |
| 6 | October 20 | Winnipeg | 3 – 5 | Detroit | | 4–2–0 | 8 | W |
| 7 | October 22 | Detroit | 6 – 9 | Pittsburgh | | 4–3–0 | 8 | L |
| 8 | October 24 | Detroit | 6 – 1 | St. Louis | | 5–3–0 | 10 | W |
| 9 | October 25 | Detroit | 2 – 8 | Chicago | | 5–4–0 | 10 | L |
| 10 | October 28 | San Jose | 3 – 4 | Detroit | | 6–4–0 | 12 | W |
| 11 | October 30 | Toronto | 1 – 7 | Detroit | | 7–4–0 | 14 | W |
| 12 | October 31 | Detroit | 1 – 3 | Toronto | | 7–5–0 | 14 | L |

November: 7–6–1 (home: 5–4–0; road: 2–2–1)

| Game | Date | Visitor | Score | Home | OT | Record | Points | Recap |
|---|---|---|---|---|---|---|---|---|
| 13 | November 4 | Montreal | 4 – 3 | Detroit | | 7–6–0 | 14 | L |
| 14 | November 6 | Hartford | 2 – 5 | Detroit | | 8–6–0 | 16 | W |
| 15 | November 7 | Detroit | 1 – 5 | Montreal | | 8–7–0 | 16 | L |
| 16 | November 11 | Detroit | 4 – 6 | Tampa Bay | | 8–8–0 | 16 | L |
| 17 | November 13 | Pittsburgh | 0 – 8 | Detroit | | 9–8–0 | 18 | W |
| 18 | November 14 | Detroit | 2 – 0 | Hartford | | 10–8–0 | 20 | W |
| 19 | November 17 | Chicago | 4 – 5 | Detroit | | 11–8–0 | 22 | W |
| 20 | November 19 | Winnipeg | 5 – 3 | Detroit | | 11–9–0 | 22 | L |
| 21 | November 20 | Detroit | 7 – 5 | Washington | | 12–9–0 | 24 | W |
| 22 | November 23 | Tampa Bay | 5 – 10 | Detroit | | 13–9–0 | 26 | W |
| 23 | November 25 | St. Louis | 6 – 11 | Detroit | | 14–9–0 | 28 | W |
| 24 | November 27 | Los Angeles | 5 – 3 | Detroit | | 14–10–0 | 28 | L |
| 25 | November 28 | Detroit | 2 – 2 | St. Louis | * | 14–10–1 | 29 | T |
| 26 | November 30 | Washington | 4 – 1 | Detroit | | 14–11–1 | 29 | L |

December: 7–6–2 (home: 3–4–1; road: 4–2–1)

| Game | Date | Visitor | Score | Home | OT | Record | Points | Recap |
|---|---|---|---|---|---|---|---|---|
| 27 | December 2 | Detroit | 3 – 5 | NY Rangers | | 14–12–1 | 29 | L |
| 28 | December 3 | Minnesota | 4 – 2 | Detroit | | 14–13–1 | 29 | L |
| 29 | December 5 | Detroit | 9 – 7 | Tampa Bay | | 15–13–1 | 31 | W |
| 30 | December 8 | Chicago | 3 – 2 | Detroit | | 15–14–1 | 31 | L |
| 31 | December 9 | Detroit | 3 – 5 | Toronto | | 15–15–1 | 31 | L |
| 32 | December 11 | Philadelphia | 2 – 4 | Detroit | | 16–15–1 | 33 | W |
| 33 | December 14 | Calgary | 3 – 0 | Detroit | | 16–16–1 | 33 | L |
| 34 | December 15 | Detroit | 3 – 2 | Ottawa | * | 17–16–1 | 35 | W |
| 35 | December 18 | Boston | 1 – 6 | Detroit | | 18–16–1 | 37 | W |
| 36 | December 19 | Detroit | 3 – 3 | Minnesota | * | 18–16–2 | 38 | T |
| 37 | December 22 | Toronto | 4 – 4 | Detroit | * | 18–16–3 | 39 | T |
| 38 | December 26 | Detroit | 5 – 1 | Toronto | | 19–16–3 | 41 | W |
| 39 | December 27 | Detroit | 4 – 0 | Chicago | | 20–16–3 | 43 | W |
| 40 | December 29 | Chicago | 6 – 3 | Detroit | | 20–17–3 | 43 | L |
| 41 | December 31 | Ottawa | 4 – 5 | Detroit | * | 21–17–3 | 45 | W |

January: 7–3–3 (home: 4–2–1; road: 3–1–2)

| Game | Date | Visitor | Score | Home | OT | Record | Points | Recap |
|---|---|---|---|---|---|---|---|---|
| 42 | January 2 | Detroit | 6 – 2 | Quebec | | 22–17–3 | 47 | W |
| 43 | January 4 | Toronto | 4 – 2 | Detroit | | 22–18–3 | 47 | L |
| 44 | January 8 | Vancouver | 3 – 6 | Detroit | | 23–18–3 | 49 | W |
| 45 | January 11 | St. Louis | 1 – 0 | Detroit | | 23–19–3 | 49 | L |
| 46 | January 13 | Tampa Bay | 3 – 5 | Detroit | | 24–19–3 | 51 | W |
| 47 | January 15 | San Jose | 3 – 6 | Detroit | | 25–19–3 | 53 | W |
| 48 | January 17 | Detroit | 7 – 4 | Philadelphia | | 26–19–3 | 55 | W |
| 49 | January 19 | NY Rangers | 2 – 2 | Detroit | * | 26–19–4 | 56 | T |
| 50 | January 21 | St. Louis | 3 – 5 | Detroit | | 27–19–4 | 58 | W |
| 51 | January 23 | Detroit | 3 – 4 | St. Louis | | 27–20–4 | 58 | L |
| 52 | January 26 | Detroit | 9 – 1 | Calgary | | 28–20–4 | 60 | W |
| 53 | January 27 | Detroit | 2 – 2 | Edmonton | * | 28–20–5 | 61 | T |
| 54 | January 30 | Detroit | 4 – 4 | Vancouver | * | 28–20–6 | 62 | T |

February: 5–4–3 (home: 3–1–1; road: 2–3–2)

| Game | Date | Visitor | Score | Home | OT | Record | Points | Recap |
|---|---|---|---|---|---|---|---|---|
| 55 | February 3 | Chicago | 0 – 5 | Detroit | | 29–20–6 | 64 | W |
| 56 | February 9 | New Jersey | 5 – 8 | Detroit | | 30–20–6 | 66 | W |
| 57 | February 11 | Detroit | 6 – 6 | Los Angeles | * | 30–20–7 | 67 | T |
| 58 | February 13 | Detroit | 3 – 4 | St. Louis | | 30–21–7 | 67 | L |
| 59 | February 14 | Detroit | 5 – 3 | Chicago | | 31–21–7 | 69 | W |
| 60 | February 17 | Tampa Bay | 1 – 3 | Detroit | | 32–21–7 | 71 | W |
| 61 | February 19 | Calgary | 3 – 3 | Detroit | * | 32–21–8 | 72 | T |
| 62 | February 21 | Detroit | 4 – 1 | Minnesota | | 33–21–8 | 74 | W |
| 63 | February 22 | Detroit | 5 – 5 | Philadelphia | * | 33–21–9 | 75 | T |
| 64 | February 24 | Detroit | 7 – 10 | Buffalo | | 33–22–9 | 75 | L |
| 65 | February 27 | Chicago | 2 – 1 | Detroit | | 33–23–9 | 75 | L |
| 66 | February 28 | Detroit | 3 – 6 | New Jersey | | 33–24–9 | 75 | L |

March: 9–4–0 (home: 3–2–0; road: 6–2–0)

| Game | Date | Visitor | Score | Home | OT | Record | Points | Recap |
|---|---|---|---|---|---|---|---|---|
| 67 | March 2 | Detroit | 2 – 3 | NY Islanders | | 33–25–9 | 75 | L |
| 68 | March 5 | Toronto | 1 – 5 | Detroit | | 34–25–9 | 77 | W |
| 69 | March 7 | Detroit | 7 – 1 | Minnesota | | 35–25–9 | 79 | W |
| 70 | March 10 | Detroit | 6 – 3 | Edmonton | | 36–25–9 | 81 | W |
| 71 | March 11 | Detroit | 3 – 6 | Calgary | | 36–26–9 | 81 | L |
| 72 | March 14 | Detroit | 4 – 1 | San Jose | | 37–26–9 | 83 | W |
| 73 | March 16 | Washington | 4 – 2 | Detroit | | 37–27–9 | 83 | L |
| 74 | March 18 | Minnesota | 1 – 5 | Detroit | | 38–27–9 | 85 | W |
| 75 | March 20 | Detroit | 7 – 4 | Boston | | 39–27–9 | 87 | W |
| 76 | March 21 | Detroit | 6 – 2 | Minnesota | | 40–27–9 | 89 | W |
| 77 | March 23 | NY Islanders | 2 – 3 | Detroit | | 41–27–9 | 91 | W |
| 78 | March 27 | Detroit | 8 – 3 | Tampa Bay | | 42–27–9 | 93 | W |
| 79 | March 29 | Los Angeles | 9 – 3 | Detroit | | 42–28–9 | 93 | L |

April: 5–0–0 (home: 3–0–0; road: 2–0–0)

| Game | Date | Visitor | Score | Home | OT | Record | Points | Recap |
|---|---|---|---|---|---|---|---|---|
| 80 | April 1 | Detroit | 3 – 1 | Chicago | | 43–28–9 | 95 | W |
| 81 | April 3 | Vancouver | 1 – 5 | Detroit | | 44–28–9 | 97 | W |
| 82 | April 8 | Detroit | 9 – 1 | Tampa Bay | | 45–28–9 | 99 | W |
| 83 | April 10 | Buffalo | 5 – 6 | Detroit | | 46–28–9 | 101 | W |
| 84 | April 13 | Minnesota | 3 – 5 | Detroit | | 47–28–9 | 103 | W |

**Legend**: W Win (2 points) L Loss (0 points) T Tie (1 point)

=== Playoffs ===
1993 Stanley Cup playoffs
Norris Division Semifinals vs. (N3) Toronto Maple Leafs: Maple Leafs win 4–3

| Game | Date | Score | Opponent | Record | Recap |
|---|---|---|---|---|---|
| 1 | April 19, 1993 | 6–3 | Toronto Maple Leafs | Red Wings lead 1–0 | W |
| 2 | April 21, 1993 | 6–2 | Toronto Maple Leafs | Red Wings lead 2–0 | W |
| 3 | April 23, 1993 | 2–4 | @ Toronto Maple Leafs | Red Wings lead 2–1 | L |
| 4 | April 25, 1993 | 2–3 | @ Toronto Maple Leafs | Series tied 2–2 | L |
| 5 | April 27, 1993 | 4–5 OT | Toronto Maple Leafs | Maple Leafs lead 3–2 | L |
| 6 | April 29, 1993 | 7–3 | @ Toronto Maple Leafs | Series tied 3–3 | W |
| 7 | May 1, 1993 | 3–4 OT | Toronto Maple Leafs | Maple Leafs win 4–3 | L |

**Legend**: W Win L Loss

== Player statistics ==
=== Scoring ===
- Position abbreviations: C = Center; D = Defense; G = Goaltender; LW = Left wing; RW = Right wing
- † = Joined team via a transaction (e.g., trade, waivers, signing) during the season. Stats reflect time with the Red Wings only.
- ‡ = Left team via a transaction (e.g., trade, waivers, release) during the season. Stats reflect time with the Red Wings only.

| No. | Player | Pos | Regular season | | | | | | Playoffs | | | | | |
| No. | Player | Pos | GP | G | A | Pts | +/- | PIM | GP | G | A | Pts | +/- | PIM |
|---|---|---|---|---|---|---|---|---|---|---|---|---|---|---|
| 19 | Steve Yzerman | C | 84 | 58 | 79 | 137 | 33 | 44 | 7 | 4 | 3 | 7 | −4 | 4 |
| 22 | Dino Ciccarelli | RW | 82 | 41 | 56 | 97 | 12 | 81 | 7 | 4 | 2 | 6 | −6 | 16 |
| 91 | Sergei Fedorov | C | 73 | 34 | 53 | 87 | 33 | 72 | 7 | 3 | 6 | 9 | 4 | 23 |
| 26 | Ray Sheppard | RW | 70 | 32 | 34 | 66 | 7 | 29 | 7 | 2 | 3 | 5 | 2 | 0 |
| 21 | Paul Ysebaert | LW | 80 | 34 | 28 | 62 | 19 | 42 | 7 | 3 | 1 | 4 | 2 | 2 |
| 3 | Steve Chiasson | D | 79 | 12 | 50 | 62 | 14 | 155 | 7 | 2 | 2 | 4 | −3 | 19 |
| 12 | Jimmy Carson‡ | C | 52 | 25 | 26 | 51 | 0 | 18 | — | — | — | — | — | — |
| 28 | Dallas Drake | LW | 72 | 18 | 26 | 44 | 15 | 93 | 7 | 3 | 3 | 6 | 3 | 6 |
| 24 | Bob Probert | RW | 80 | 14 | 29 | 43 | −9 | 292 | 7 | 0 | 3 | 3 | −1 | 10 |
| 5 | Nicklas Lidstrom | D | 84 | 7 | 34 | 41 | 7 | 28 | 7 | 1 | 0 | 1 | −2 | 0 |
| 33 | Yves Racine | D | 80 | 9 | 31 | 40 | 10 | 80 | 7 | 1 | 3 | 4 | 4 | 27 |
| 11 | Shawn Burr | LW | 80 | 10 | 25 | 35 | 18 | 74 | 7 | 2 | 1 | 3 | −2 | 2 |
| 4 | Mark Howe | D | 60 | 3 | 31 | 34 | 22 | 22 | 7 | 1 | 3 | 4 | 6 | 2 |
| 55 | Keith Primeau | C | 73 | 15 | 17 | 32 | −6 | 152 | 7 | 0 | 2 | 2 | 1 | 26 |
| 15 | Sheldon Kennedy | C | 68 | 19 | 11 | 30 | −1 | 46 | 7 | 1 | 1 | 2 | 1 | 2 |
| 17 | Gerard Gallant | LW | 67 | 10 | 20 | 30 | 20 | 188 | 6 | 1 | 2 | 3 | −4 | 4 |
| 77 | Paul Coffey† | D | 30 | 4 | 26 | 30 | 7 | 27 | 7 | 2 | 9 | 11 | −3 | 2 |
| 16 | Vladimir Konstantinov | D | 82 | 5 | 17 | 22 | 22 | 137 | 7 | 0 | 1 | 1 | −1 | 8 |
| 23 | Mike Sillinger | C | 51 | 4 | 17 | 21 | 0 | 16 | — | — | — | — | — | — |
| 2 | Brad McCrimmon | D | 60 | 1 | 14 | 15 | 21 | 71 | — | — | — | — | — | — |
| 25 (Note: Ogrodnick wore number 18 in his first five games.) | John Ogrodnick | LW | 19 | 6 | 6 | 12 | −2 | 2 | 1 | 0 | 0 | 0 | −1 | 0 |
| 14 | Jim Hiller† | RW | 21 | 2 | 6 | 8 | 7 | 19 | 2 | 0 | 0 | 0 | 0 | 4 |
| 13 | Vyacheslav Kozlov | C | 17 | 4 | 1 | 5 | −1 | 14 | 4 | 0 | 2 | 2 | 1 | 2 |
| 32 | Tim Cheveldae | G | 67 | 0 | 4 | 4 | | 4 | 7 | 0 | 2 | 2 | | 2 |
| 27 | Jim Cummins | RW | 7 | 1 | 1 | 2 | 0 | 58 | — | — | — | — | — | — |
| 18 | Chris Tancill | C | 4 | 1 | 0 | 1 | −2 | 2 | — | — | — | — | — | — |
| 8 | Steve Konroyd† | D | 6 | 0 | 1 | 1 | 1 | 4 | 1 | 0 | 0 | 0 | −1 | 0 |
| 29 | Dennis Vial | D | 9 | 0 | 1 | 1 | 1 | 20 | — | — | — | — | — | — |
| 38 | Bobby Dollas | D | 6 | 0 | 0 | 0 | −1 | 2 | — | — | — | — | — | — |
| 8 | Gord Kruppke | D | 10 | 0 | 0 | 0 | 1 | 20 | — | — | — | — | — | — |
| 20 | Martin Lapointe | RW | 3 | 0 | 0 | 0 | −2 | 0 | — | — | — | — | — | — |
| 37 | Vincent Riendeau | G | 22 | 0 | 0 | 0 | | 2 | — | — | — | — | — | — |
| 38 | Jason York | D | 2 | 0 | 0 | 0 | 0 | 0 | — | — | — | — | — | — |

=== Goaltending ===
| No. | Player | Regular season | | | | | | | | | | Playoffs | | | | | | | | |
| No. | Player | GP | W | L | T | SA | GA | GAA | SV% | SO | TOI | GP | W | L | SA | GA | GAA | SV% | SO | TOI |
|---|---|---|---|---|---|---|---|---|---|---|---|---|---|---|---|---|---|---|---|---|
| 32 | Tim Cheveldae | 67 | 34 | 24 | 7 | 1897 | 210 | 3.25 | .889 | 4 | 3880 | 7 | 3 | 4 | 200 | 24 | 3.40 | .880 | 0 | 423 |
| 37 | Vincent Riendeau | 22 | 13 | 4 | 2 | 522 | 64 | 3.22 | .877 | 0 | 1193 | — | — | — | — | — | — | — | — | — |

== Draft picks ==
Detroit's draft picks at the 1992 NHL entry draft held at the Montreal Forum in Montreal, Quebec.

| Round | # | Player | Nationality | College/Junior/Club team (League) |
|---|---|---|---|---|
| 1 | 22 | Curtis Bowen | Canada | Ottawa 67's (OHL) |
| 2 | 46 | Darren McCarty | Canada | Belleville Bulls (OHL) |
| 3 | 70 | Sylvain Cloutier | Canada | Guelph Storm (OHL) |
| 5 | 118 | Mike Sullivan | United States | Reading High School (USHS-MA) |
| 6 | 142 | Jason MacDonald | Canada | Owen Sound Platers (OHL) |
| 7 | 166 | Greg Scott | Canada | Niagara Falls Thunder (OHL) |
| 8 | 183 | Justin Krall | United States | Omaha Lancers (USHL) |
| 8 | 189 | C. J. Denomme | Canada | Kitchener Rangers (OHL) |
| 9 | 214 | Jeff Walker | Canada | Peterborough Petes (OHL) |
| 10 | 238 | Dan McGillis | Canada | Hawkesbury Hawks (CJHL) |
| 11 | 262 | Ryan Bach | Canada | Notre Dame Hounds (SJHL) |
