= 1992–93 New Jersey Devils season =

National Hockey League season

1992–93 New Jersey Devils
- Division: 4th Patrick
- Conference: 7th Wales
- 1992–93 record: 40–37–7
- Home record: 24–14–4
- Road record: 16–23–3
- Goals for: 308
- Goals against: 299

Team information
- General manager: Lou Lamoriello
- Coach: Herb Brooks
- Captain: Scott Stevens
- Alternate captains: Bruce Driver; John MacLean
- Arena: Brendan Byrne Arena
- Average attendance: 13,658

Team leaders
- Goals: Alexander Semak (37)
- Assists: Claude Lemieux (51)
- Points: Claude Lemieux (81)
- Penalty minutes: Ken Daneyko (236)
- Plus/minus: Alexander Semak (+24)
- Wins: Craig Billington (21)
- Goals against average: Chris Terreri (3.39)

The 1992–93 New Jersey Devils season was the 19th season for the National Hockey League (NHL) franchise that was established on June 11, 1974, and 11th season since the franchise relocated from Colorado prior to the 1982–83 NHL season. The Devils finished fourth in the Patrick Division with a record of 40 wins, 37 losses and seven ties for 87 points. However, they lost the Patrick Division Semifinals to the Presidents' Trophy-winning Pittsburgh Penguins in five games.

The Devils were coached by Herb Brooks, who had led the U.S. men's ice hockey team to victory in the 1980 Winter Olympics in Lake Placid, New York. The team was captained by defenseman Scott Stevens.

In 1992–93 the Devils debuted a new color scheme – they kept the red and white, but replaced the green with black. The red, white and black color scheme is still in use today.

== Regular season ==
The Devils tied the Pittsburgh Penguins for most short-handed goals allowed in the NHL, with 19.

=== Final standings ===
Patrick Division
	GP	W	L	T	Pts	GF	GA
**Pittsburgh Penguins**	84	56	21	7	**119**	367	268
**Washington Capitals**	84	43	34	7	**93**	325	286
**New York Islanders**	84	40	37	7	**87**	335	297
**New Jersey Devils**	84	40	37	7	**87**	308	299
Philadelphia Flyers	84	36	37	11	83	319	319
New York Rangers	84	34	39	11	79	304	308

Note: GP = Games played, W = Wins, L = Losses, T = Ties, Pts = Points, GF = Goals for, GA = Goals against
Note: Teams that qualified for the playoffs are highlighted in bold.

Wales Conference
R		Div	GP	W	L	T	GF	GA	Pts
**1**	**p – Pittsburgh Penguins**	**PTK**	**84**	**56**	**21**	**7**	**367**	**268**	**119**
**2**	**Boston Bruins**	**ADM**	**84**	**51**	**26**	**7**	**332**	**268**	**109**
**3**	**Quebec Nordiques**	**ADM**	**84**	**47**	**27**	**10**	**351**	**300**	**104**
**4**	**Montreal Canadiens**	**ADM**	**84**	**48**	**30**	**6**	**326**	**280**	**102**
**5**	**Washington Capitals**	**PTK**	**84**	**43**	**34**	**7**	**325**	**286**	**93**
**6**	**New York Islanders**	**PTK**	**84**	**40**	**37**	**7**	**335**	**297**	**87**
**7**	**New Jersey Devils**	**PTK**	**84**	**40**	**37**	**7**	**308**	**299**	**87**
**8**	**Buffalo Sabres**	**ADM**	**84**	**38**	**36**	**10**	**335**	**297**	**86**
9	Philadelphia Flyers	PTK	84	36	37	11	319	319	83
10	New York Rangers	PTK	84	34	39	11	304	308	79
11	Hartford Whalers	ADM	84	26	52	6	284	369	58
12	Ottawa Senators	ADM	84	10	70	4	202	395	24

p – Won Presidents' Trophy (and division)
Divisions: PTK – Patrick, ADM – Adams
bold – Qualified for playoffs

== Playoffs ==
=== Patrick Division Semifinals ===
The series opened at Civic Arena. Pittsburgh won Game 1, 6–3, and Game 2, 7–0. Games 3 and 4 were at New Jersey. Pittsburgh won Game 3, 4–3, and the Devils won Game 4, 4–1. Game 5 was played back in Pittsburgh, where the Penguins won 5–3 and won the series 4–1.

== Schedule and results ==
=== Regular season ===
1992–93 regular season
October: 7–5–0 (home: 4–3–0; road: 3–2–0)

Game	Date	Score	Opponent	Record	Recap
1	October 6, 1992	4–3	New York Islanders	1–0–0	W
2	October 9, 1992	4–6	@ Philadelphia Flyers	1–1–0	L
3	October 10, 1992	4–2	New York Rangers	2–1–0	W
4	October 12, 1992	4–2	Washington Capitals	3–1–0	W
5	October 14, 1992	1–6	@ New York Rangers	3–2–0	L
6	October 17, 1992	2–0	Philadelphia Flyers	4–2–0	W
7	October 20, 1992	4–5	Hartford Whalers	4–3–0	L
8	October 22, 1992	6–5 OT	@ Chicago Blackhawks	5–3–0	W
9	October 24, 1992	3–4	Pittsburgh Penguins	5–4–0	L
10	October 28, 1992	4–3 OT	@ Hartford Whalers	6–4–0	W
11	October 30, 1992	1–4	New York Islanders	6–5–0	L
12	October 31, 1992	5–3	@ New York Islanders	7–5–0	W

November: 5–5–0 (home: 2–2–0; road: 3–3–0)

Game	Date	Score	Opponent	Record	Recap
13	November 5, 1992	2–5	@ Los Angeles Kings	7–6–0	L
14	November 7, 1992	6–1	@ San Jose Sharks	8–6–0	W
15	November 11, 1992	3–8	Montreal Canadiens	8–7–0	L
16	November 13, 1992	3–0	Washington Capitals	9–7–0	W
17	November 14, 1992	4–3 OT	@ Washington Capitals	10–7–0	W
18	November 18, 1992	3–2	Buffalo Sabres	11–7–0	W
19	November 20, 1992	1–4	Pittsburgh Penguins	11–8–0	L
20	November 21, 1992	0–2	@ Pittsburgh Penguins	11–9–0	L
21	November 25, 1992	1–3	@ Ottawa Senators	11–10–0	L
22	November 28, 1992	6–3	@ Quebec Nordiques	12–10–0	W

December: 6–6–1 (home: 3–3–0; road: 3–3–1)

Game	Date	Score	Opponent	Record	Recap
23	December 1, 1992	8–3	Toronto Maple Leafs	13–10–0	W
24	December 3, 1992	3–3 OT	@ Ottawa Senators	13–10–1	T
25	December 5, 1992	2–4	Boston Bruins	13–11–1	L
26	December 6, 1992	7–3	@ Buffalo Sabres	14–11–1	W
27	December 9, 1992	2–6	Washington Capitals	14–12–1	L
28	December 11, 1992	2–1	Pittsburgh Penguins	15–12–1	W
29	December 12, 1992	5–6	@ Pittsburgh Penguins	15–13–1	L
30	December 15, 1992	3–4	@ Winnipeg Jets	15–14–1	L
31	December 18, 1992	2–0	@ Tampa Bay Lightning	16–14–1	W
32	December 21, 1992	0–3	New York Rangers	16–15–1	L
33	December 23, 1992	5–4 OT	@ New York Rangers	17–15–1	W
34	December 27, 1992	6–2	Hartford Whalers	18–15–1	W
35	December 29, 1992	1–4	@ Quebec Nordiques	18–16–1	L

January: 6–6–3 (home: 5–1–1; road: 1–5–2)

Game	Date	Score	Opponent	Record	Recap
36	January 1, 1993	2–9	@ Washington Capitals	18–17–1	L
37	January 2, 1993	2–2 OT	Winnipeg Jets	18–17–2	T
38	January 4, 1993	3–3 OT	@ New York Rangers	18–17–3	T
39	January 6, 1993	5–1	Minnesota North Stars	19–17–3	W
40	January 8, 1993	6–4	Ottawa Senators	20–17–3	W
41	January 9, 1993	6–2	@ Boston Bruins	21–17–3	W
42	January 12, 1993	3–2	Vancouver Canucks	22–17–3	W
43	January 14, 1993	7–1	Los Angeles Kings	23–17–3	W
44	January 16, 1993	3–5	New York Islanders	23–18–3	L
45	January 20, 1993	2–3	@ Montreal Canadiens	23–19–3	L
46	January 22, 1993	6–2	Montreal Canadiens	24–19–3	W
47	January 23, 1993	5–7	@ Boston Bruins	24–20–3	L
48	January 26, 1993	2–8	@ New York Islanders	24–21–3	L
49	January 28, 1993	2–4	@ Minnesota North Stars	24–22–3	L
50	January 30, 1993	2–2 OT	@ St. Louis Blues	24–22–4	T

February: 7–4–1 (home: 5–2–1; road: 2–2–0)

Game	Date	Score	Opponent	Record	Recap
51	February 3, 1993	4–5	Calgary Flames	24–23–4	L
52	February 8, 1993	5–4	New York Rangers	25–23–4	W
53	February 9, 1993	5–8	@ Detroit Red Wings	25–24–4	L
54	February 13, 1993	6–4	Philadelphia Flyers	26–24–4	W
55	February 14, 1993	5–2	@ Philadelphia Flyers	27–24–4	W
56	February 17, 1993	4–3	St. Louis Blues	28–24–4	W
57	February 19, 1993	3–3 OT	Buffalo Sabres	28–24–5	T
58	February 21, 1993	3–6	Quebec Nordiques	28–25–5	L
59	February 23, 1993	3–1	@ Pittsburgh Penguins	29–25–5	W
60	February 25, 1993	2–6	@ Philadelphia Flyers	29–26–5	L
61	February 27, 1993	5–2	Ottawa Senators	30–26–5	W
62	February 28, 1993	6–3	Detroit Red Wings	31–26–5	W

March: 7–7–1 (home: 4–1–1; road: 3–6–0)

Game	Date	Score	Opponent	Record	Recap
63	March 3, 1993	7–4	@ Hartford Whalers	32–26–5	W
64	March 5, 1993	1–1 OT	Chicago Blackhawks	32–26–6	T
65	March 7, 1993	7–3	Philadelphia Flyers	33–26–6	W
66	March 9, 1993	2–7	@ Vancouver Canucks	33–27–6	L
67	March 12, 1993	4–6	@ Edmonton Oilers	33–28–6	L
68	March 13, 1993	3–4	@ Calgary Flames	33–29–6	L
69	March 16, 1993	1–3	@ Boston Bruins	33–30–6	L
70	March 18, 1993	5–1	Edmonton Oilers	34–30–6	W
71	March 20, 1993	1–5	Quebec Nordiques	34–31–6	L
72	March 21, 1993	3–2	@ Philadelphia Flyers	35–31–6	W
73	March 23, 1993	9–3	Tampa Bay Lightning	36–31–6	W
74	March 25, 1993	3–4	@ Pittsburgh Penguins	36–32–6	L
75	March 27, 1993	5–2	@ Washington Capitals	37–32–6	W
76	March 29, 1993	5–0	San Jose Sharks	38–32–6	W
77	March 31, 1993	2–5	@ Buffalo Sabres	38–33–6	L

April: 2–4–1 (home: 1–2–1; road: 1–2–0)

Game	Date	Score	Opponent	Record	Recap
78	April 3, 1993	0–1	@ Toronto Maple Leafs	38–34–6	L
79	April 4, 1993	2–5	Pittsburgh Penguins	38–35–6	L
80	April 7, 1993	5–2	New York Rangers	39–35–6	W
81	April 10, 1993	5–3	@ Washington Capitals	40–35–6	W
82	April 11, 1993	4–5	New York Islanders	40–36–6	L
83	April 14, 1993	6–6 OT	Pittsburgh Penguins	40–36–7	T
84	April 16, 1993	4–8	@ New York Islanders	40–37–7	L

Legend: W Win (2 points) L Loss (0 points) T Tie (1 point)

=== Playoffs ===
1993 Stanley Cup playoffs
Patrick Division Semifinals vs. (P1) Pittsburgh Penguins – Penguins win 4–1

Game	Date	Score	Opponent	Series	Recap
1	April 18, 1993	3–6	@ Pittsburgh Penguins	Penguins lead 1–0	L
2	April 20, 1993	0–7	@ Pittsburgh Penguins	Penguins lead 2–0	L
3	April 22, 1993	3–4	Pittsburgh Penguins	Penguins lead 3–0	L
4	April 25, 1993	4–1	Pittsburgh Penguins	Penguins lead 3–1	W
5	April 26, 1993	3–5	@ Pittsburgh Penguins	Penguins win 4–1	L

Legend: W Win L Loss

== Player statistics ==
=== Regular season ===
Scoring

Player	Pos	GP	G	A	Pts	PIM	+/-	PPG	SHG	GWG
Claude Lemieux	RW	77	30	51	81	155	3	13	0	3
Alexander Semak	C	82	37	42	79	70	24	4	1	6
Stephane Richer	RW	78	38	35	73	44	-1	7	1	7
Valeri Zelepukin	LW	78	23	41	64	70	19	5	1	2
Scott Stevens	D	81	12	45	57	120	14	8	0	1
Bruce Driver	D	83	14	40	54	66	-10	6	0	0
John MacLean	RW	80	24	24	48	102	-6	7	1	3
Peter Stastny	C	62	17	23	40	22	-5	7	0	3
Scott Niedermayer	D	80	11	29	40	47	8	5	0	0
Bobby Holik	C	61	20	19	39	76	-6	7	0	4
Bill Guerin	RW	65	14	20	34	63	14	0	0	2
Viacheslav Fetisov	D	76	4	23	27	158	7	1	1	0
Randy McKay	RW	73	11	11	22	206	0	1	0	2
Scott Pellerin	LW	45	10	11	21	41	-1	1	2	0
Bernie Nicholls	C	23	5	15	20	40	3	1	0	0
Tom Chorske	LW	50	7	12	19	25	-1	0	0	1
Alexei Kasatonov	D	64	3	14	17	57	4	0	0	0
Dave Barr	RW	62	6	8	14	61	1	0	1	1
Janne Ojanen	C	31	4	9	13	14	-2	1	0	1
Ken Daneyko	D	84	2	11	13	236	4	0	0	0
Zdeno Ciger	LW	27	4	8	12	2	-8	2	0	1
Kevin Todd	C	30	5	5	10	16	-4	0	0	2
Troy Mallette	LW	34	4	3	7	56	3	0	0	0
Tommy Albelin	D	36	1	5	6	14	0	1	0	1
Doug Brown	RW	15	0	5	5	2	3	0	0	0
Ben Hankinson	RW	4	2	1	3	9	2	0	0	0
Jarrod Skalde	C	11	0	2	2	4	-3	0	0	0
Claude Vilgrain	RW	4	0	2	2	0	-3	0	0	0
Craig Billington	G	42	0	1	1	8	0	0	0	0
Brian Sullivan	RW	2	0	1	1	0	-1	0	0	0
Jim Dowd	C	1	0	0	0	0	-1	0	0	0
David Emma	C	2	0	0	0	0	0	0	0	0
Jason Miller	LW	2	0	0	0	0	-1	0	0	0
Jon Morris	C	2	0	0	0	0	-1	0	0	0
Myles O'Connor	D	7	0	0	0	9	-4	0	0	0
Chris Terreri	G	48	0	0	0	6	0	0	0	0

Goaltending

Player	MIN	GP	W	L	T	GA	GAA	SO	SA	SV	SV%
Craig Billington	2389	42	21	16	4	146	3.67	2	1178	1032	.876
Chris Terreri	2672	48	19	21	3	151	3.39	2	1324	1173	.886
Team:	5061	84	40	37	7	297	3.52	4	2502	2205	.881

=== Playoffs ===
Scoring

Player	Pos	GP	G	A	Pts	PIM	PPG	SHG	GWG
Stephane Richer	RW	5	2	2	4	2	1	0	0
Scott Stevens	D	5	2	2	4	10	1	0	0
Bruce Driver	D	5	1	3	4	4	0	1	0
Scott Niedermayer	D	5	0	3	3	2	0	0	0
Tommy Albelin	D	5	2	0	2	0	1	0	1
Claude Lemieux	RW	5	2	0	2	19	1	0	0
Bill Guerin	RW	5	1	1	2	4	0	0	0
Bobby Holik	C	5	1	1	2	6	0	0	0
Alexander Semak	C	5	1	1	2	0	0	0	0
Viacheslav Fetisov	D	5	0	2	2	4	0	0	0
Peter Stastny	C	5	0	2	2	2	0	0	0
Valeri Zelepukin	LW	5	0	2	2	0	0	0	0
Dave Barr	RW	5	1	0	1	6	0	0	0
John MacLean	RW	5	0	1	1	10	0	0	0
Craig Billington	G	2	0	0	0	0	0	0	0
Tom Chorske	LW	1	0	0	0	0	0	0	0
Ken Daneyko	D	5	0	0	0	8	0	0	0
Alexei Kasatonov	D	4	0	0	0	0	0	0	0
Randy McKay	RW	5	0	0	0	16	0	0	0
Bernie Nicholls	C	5	0	0	0	6	0	0	0
Chris Terreri	G	4	0	0	0	0	0	0	0

Goaltending

Player	MIN	GP	W	L	GA	GAA	SO	SA	SV	SV%
Chris Terreri	219	4	1	3	17	4.66	0	118	101	.856
Craig Billington	78	2	0	1	5	3.85	0	39	34	.872
Team:	297	5	1	4	22	4.44	0	157	135	.860

Note: GP = Games played; G = Goals; A = Assists; Pts = Points; +/- = Plus/minus; PIM = Penalty minutes; PPG = Power-play goals; SHG = Short-handed goals; GWG = Game-winning goals
MIN = Minutes played; W = Wins; L = Losses; T = Ties; GA = Goals against; GAA = Goals against average; SO = Shutouts; SA = Shots against; SV = Shots saved; SV% = Save percentage;

== Awards and records ==
=== Awards ===
Regular Season
Player	Award	Awarded
Scott Niedermayer	NHL All-Rookie Team – Defense	End of regular season

== Draft picks ==
The New Jersey Devils' picks at the 1992 NHL entry draft.

Rd #	Pick #	Player	Nat	Pos	Team (League)	Notes
1	18	Jason Smith	Canada	D	Regina Pats (WHL)	
2	42	Sergei Brylin	Russia	C	CSKA Moscow (Russian Superleague)	
3	66	Cale Hulse	Canada	D	Portland Winter Hawks (WHL)	
4	90	Vitaly Tomilin	Russia	C	Krylya Sovetov (Russian Superleague)	
4	94	Scott McCabe	United States	D	Detroit Midgets	(Note: The Devils acquired the 1992 fourth-round pick, along with Lee Norwood, from Detroit for Paul Ysebaert on November 27, 1990.)
5	114	Ryan Black	Canada	LW	Peterborough Petes (OHL)	
6	138	Dan Trebil	United States	D	Bloomington Jefferson H.S. (Minnesota)	
7	162	Geordie Kinnear	Canada	D	Peterborough Petes (OHL)	
8	186	Stephane Yelle	Canada	C	Oshawa Generals (OHL)	
9	210	Jeff Toms	Canada	LW	Sault Ste. Marie Greyhounds (OHL)	
10	234	Heath Weenk	Canada	D	Regina Pats (WHL)	
11	258	Vladislav Yakovenko	Russia	LW	Spartak Moscow (Russian Superleague)	

== See also ==
- 1992–93 NHL season
