= 1992–93 New York Rangers season =

NHL hockey team season

1992–93 New York Rangers
- Division: 6th Patrick
- Conference: 10th Wales
- 1992–93 record: 34–39–11
- Home record: 20–17–5
- Road record: 14–22–6
- Goals for: 304
- Goals against: 308

Team information
- General manager: Neil Smith
- Coach: Roger Neilson (Oct.–Jan.); Ron Smith (Jan.–Apr.)
- Captain: Mark Messier
- Alternate captains: Adam Graves; Brian Leetch; Mike Gartner
- Arena: Madison Square Garden
- Average attendance: 17,585

Team leaders
- Goals: Mike Gartner (45)
- Assists: Mark Messier (66)
- Points: Mark Messier (91)
- Penalty minutes: Jeff Beukeboom (153)
- Plus/minus: Sergei Nemchinov (+15)
- Wins: John Vanbiesbrouck (20)
- Goals against average: John Vanbiesbrouck (3.31)

The 1992–93 New York Rangers season was the franchise's 67th season. The Rangers, coming off a Presidents' Trophy-winning 1991–92 season, finished with a 34–39–11 record in the regular season. The team finished last in the Patrick Division and missed the playoffs for the first time since the 1987–88 season.

Roger Neilson entered his fourth season as Rangers head coach, but was fired midway through the season, in January 1993, and replaced by Ron Smith.

== Regular season ==
On December 15, 1992, the Rangers were shut-out at home 3–0 by the Calgary Flames. It was the first time the Rangers had been shut out in a regular season game since December 17, 1989, when they lost at home 2–0 to the Montreal Canadiens. Prior to their loss to the Flames, the Rangers had gone 236 consecutive regular-season games without being shutout.

The Rangers failed to qualify for the 1993 Stanley Cup playoffs, missing the postseason for the first time since 1988.

=== Final standings ===
Patrick Division
	GP	W	L	T	Pts	GF	GA
**Pittsburgh Penguins**	84	56	21	7	**119**	367	268
**Washington Capitals**	84	43	34	7	**93**	325	286
**New York Islanders**	84	40	37	7	**87**	335	297
**New Jersey Devils**	84	40	37	7	**87**	308	299
Philadelphia Flyers	84	36	37	11	83	319	319
New York Rangers	84	34	39	11	79	304	308

Note: GP = Games played, W = Wins, L = Losses, T = Ties, Pts = Points, GF = Goals for, GA = Goals against
Note: Teams that qualified for the playoffs are highlighted in bold.

Wales Conference
R		Div	GP	W	L	T	GF	GA	Pts
**1**	**p – Pittsburgh Penguins**	**PTK**	**84**	**56**	**21**	**7**	**367**	**268**	**119**
**2**	**Boston Bruins**	**ADM**	**84**	**51**	**26**	**7**	**332**	**268**	**109**
**3**	**Quebec Nordiques**	**ADM**	**84**	**47**	**27**	**10**	**351**	**300**	**104**
**4**	**Montreal Canadiens**	**ADM**	**84**	**48**	**30**	**6**	**326**	**280**	**102**
**5**	**Washington Capitals**	**PTK**	**84**	**43**	**34**	**7**	**325**	**286**	**93**
**6**	**New York Islanders**	**PTK**	**84**	**40**	**37**	**7**	**335**	**297**	**87**
**7**	**New Jersey Devils**	**PTK**	**84**	**40**	**37**	**7**	**308**	**299**	**87**
**8**	**Buffalo Sabres**	**ADM**	**84**	**38**	**36**	**10**	**335**	**297**	**86**
9	Philadelphia Flyers	PTK	84	36	37	11	319	319	83
10	New York Rangers	PTK	84	34	39	11	304	308	79
11	Hartford Whalers	ADM	84	26	52	6	284	369	58
12	Ottawa Senators	ADM	84	10	70	4	202	395	24

p – Won Presidents' Trophy (and division)
Divisions: PTK – Patrick, ADM – Adams
bold – Qualified for playoffs

== Schedule and results ==
1992–93 regular season
October: 7–4–1 (home: 5–1–1; road: 2–3–0)

Game	Date	Opponent	Score	Record	Recap
1	October 9	@ Washington Capitals	4–2	1–0–0	W
2	October 10	@ New Jersey Devils	4–2	1–1–0	L
3	October 12	Hartford Whalers	6–2	2–1–0	W
4	October 14	New Jersey Devils	6–1	3–1–0	W
5	October 17	@ New York Islanders	6–3	3–2–0	L
6	October 18	New York Islanders	4–3	4–2–0	W
7	October 21	Washington Capitals	2–1	5–2–0	W
8	October 23	Montreal Canadiens	3–3 OT	5–2–1	T
9	October 24	@ Ottawa Senators	3–2 OT	6–2–1	W
10	October 26	Philadelphia Flyers	8–4	7–2–1	W
11	October 29	Quebec Nordiques	6–3	7–3–1	L
12	October 31	@ Montreal Canadiens	4–3	7–4–1	L

November: 4–6–2 (home: 2–4–0; road: 2–2–2)

Game	Date	Opponent	Score	Record	Recap
13	November 2	Buffalo Sabres	7–6 OT	8–4–1	W
14	November 4	Philadelphia Flyers	3–1	9–4–1	W
15	November 7	@ Boston Bruins	2–2 OT	9–4–2	T
16	November 9	Tampa Bay Lightning	5–1	9–5–2	L
17	November 11	Washington Capitals	7–4	9–6–2	L
18	November 14	@ Quebec Nordiques	6–3	9–7–2	L
19	November 19	@ Philadelphia Flyers	7–3	9–8–2	L
20	November 21	@ Winnipeg Jets	5–4	10–8–2	W
21	November 23	Pittsburgh Penguins	5–2	10–9–2	L
22	November 25	@ Pittsburgh Penguins	11–3	11–9–2	W
23	November 27	@ Minnesota North Stars	4–4 OT	11–9–3	T
24	November 30	Minnesota North Stars	4–2	11–10–3	L

December: 8–6–1 (home: 5–2–0; road: 3–4–1)

Game	Date	Opponent	Score	Record	Recap
25	December 2	Detroit Red Wings	5–3	12–10–3	W
26	December 4	@ Washington Capitals	8–4	12–11–3	L
27	December 6	Toronto Maple Leafs	6–0	13–11–3	W
28	December 9	Tampa Bay Lightning	6–5	14–11–3	W
29	December 11	@ Tampa Bay Lightning	5–4	15–11–3	W
30	December 13	Montreal Canadiens	10–5	16–11–3	W
31	December 15	Calgary Flames	3–0	16–12–3	L
32	December 17	@ St. Louis Blues	4–3	17–12–3	W
33	December 19	@ Hartford Whalers	4–4 OT	17–12–4	T
34	December 21	@ New Jersey Devils	3–0	18–12–4	W
35	December 23	New Jersey Devils	5–4 OT	18–13–4	L
36	December 26	@ New York Islanders	6–4	18–14–4	L
37	December 27	Boston Bruins	6–5	19–14–4	W
38	December 29	@ Washington Capitals	4–3 OT	19–15–4	L
39	December 31	@ Buffalo Sabres	11–6	19–16–4	L

January: 4–5–3 (home: 3–0–2; road: 1–5–1)

Game	Date	Opponent	Score	Record	Recap
40	January 2	@ Pittsburgh Penguins	5–2	19–17–4	L
41	January 4	New Jersey Devils	3–3 OT	19–17–5	T
42	January 6	Ottawa Senators	6–2	20–17–5	W
43	January 9	@ Philadelphia Flyers	4–3	20–18–5	L
44	January 11	Vancouver Canucks	3–3 OT	20–18–6	T
45	January 13	Washington Capitals	5–4	21–18–6	W
46	January 16	@ Montreal Canadiens	3–0	21–19–6	L
47	January 19	@ Detroit Red Wings	2–2 OT	21–19–7	T
48	January 23	@ Los Angeles Kings	8–3	22–19–7	W
49	January 27	Winnipeg Jets	5–2	23–19–7	W
50	January 29	@ Buffalo Sabres	6–4	23–20–7	L
51	January 30	@ Toronto Maple Leafs	3–1	23–21–7	L

February: 5–4–3 (home: 2–1–1; road: 3–3–2)

Game	Date	Opponent	Score	Record	Recap
52	February 1	@ New York Islanders	4–4 OT	23–21–8	T
53	February 3	Philadelphia Flyers	2–2 OT	23–21–9	T
54	February 8	@ New Jersey Devils	5–4	23–22–9	L
55	February 10	Pittsburgh Penguins	3–0	23–23–9	L
56	February 12	New York Islanders	4–3	24–23–9	W
57	February 13	@ New York Islanders	5–2	24–24–9	L
58	February 15	St. Louis Blues	4–1	25–24–9	W
59	February 20	@ San Jose Sharks	6–4	26–24–9	W
60	February 22	@ San Jose Sharks	4–0	27–24–9	W
61	February 24	@ Vancouver Canucks	5–4	27–25–9	L
62	February 26	@ Calgary Flames	4–4 OT	27–25–10	T
63	February 27	@ Edmonton Oilers	1–0	28–25–10	W

March: 5–6–1 (home: 3–5–1; road: 2–1–0)

Game	Date	Opponent	Score	Record	Recap
64	March 3	Buffalo Sabres	2–2 OT	28–25–11	T
65	March 5	Pittsburgh Penguins	3–1	29–25–11	W
66	March 6	@ Quebec Nordiques	10–2	29–26–11	L
67	March 9	Los Angeles Kings	4–3	30–26–11	W
68	March 11	@ Chicago Blackhawks	4–1	31–26–11	W
69	March 15	Boston Bruins	3–1	31–27–11	L
70	March 17	Edmonton Oilers	4–3 OT	31–28–11	L
71	March 19	San Jose Sharks	8–1	32–28–11	W
72	March 22	@ Ottawa Senators	5–4	33–28–11	W
73	March 24	Philadelphia Flyers	5–4	33–29–11	L
74	March 26	Chicago Blackhawks	3–1	33–30–11	L
75	March 28	Quebec Nordiques	3–2	33–31–11	L

April: 1–8–0 (home: 0–4–0; road: 1–4–0)

Game	Date	Opponent	Score	Record	Recap
76	April 2	New York Islanders	3–2 OT	33–32–11	L
77	April 4	@ Washington Capitals	4–0	34–32–11	W
78	April 5	Hartford Whalers	5–4	34–33–11	L
79	April 7	@ New Jersey Devils	5–2	34–34–11	L
80	April 9	Pittsburgh Penguins	10–4	34–35–11	L
81	April 10	@ Pittsburgh Penguins	4–2	34–36–11	L
82	April 12	@ Philadelphia Flyers	1–0	34–37–11	L
83	April 14	Washington Capitals	2–0	34–38–11	L
84	April 16	@ Washington Capitals	4–2	34–39–11	L

Legend: W Win (2 points) L Loss (0 points) T Tie (1 point)

== Player statistics ==
Skaters

Regular season
Player	Number	GP	G	A	Pts	+/−	PIM
Mark Messier	11	75	25	66	91	−6	72
Tony Amonte	33	83	33	43	76	0	49
Mike Gartner	22	84	45	23	68	−4	59
Adam Graves	9	84	36	29	65	−4	148
Sergei Nemchinov	13	81	23	31	54	15	34
Darren Turcotte	8	71	25	28	53	−3	40
Doug Weight^{‡}	39	65	15	25	40	4	55
Alexei Kovalev	27	65	20	18	38	−10	79
Brian Leetch	2	36	6	30	36	2	26
Sergei Zubov	21	49	8	23	31	−1	4
Eddie Olczyk^{†}	12	46	13	16	29	9	26
James Patrick	3	60	5	21	26	1	61
Phil Bourque	29	55	6	14	20	−9	39
Jeff Beukeboom	23	82	2	17	19	9	153
Jan Erixon	20	45	5	11	16	11	10
Peter Andersson	5	31	4	11	15	4	18
Kevin Lowe	4	49	3	12	15	−2	58
Paul Broten	37	60	5	9	14	−6	48
Steven King	25	24	7	5	12	4	16
Mark Hardy^{‡}	14	44	1	10	11	2	85
Jay Wells	24	53	1	9	10	−2	107
Joe Cirella	6	55	3	6	9	1	85
Joe Kocur	26	65	3	6	9	−9	131
Mike Hurlbut	32	23	1	8	9	4	16
Esa Tikkanen^{†}	10	15	2	5	7	−13	18
Randy Gilhen^{‡}	15	33	3	2	5	−8	8
Kris King^{‡}	19	30	0	3	3	−1	67
Tie Domi^{‡}	28	12	2	0	2	−1	95
Par Djoos	44	6	1	1	2	0	2
John McIntyre^{†}	14	11	1	0	1	−1	4
Craig Duncanson	19	3	0	1	1	0	0
Dave Marcinyshyn	42	2	0	0	0	−1	2
Mike Hartman^{†}	18	3	0	0	0	0	6
Joby Messier	28	11	0	0	0	0	6

Goaltenders

Regular season
Player	Number	GP	TOI	W	L	T	GA	GAA	SA	SV%	SO
John Vanbiesbrouck	34	48	2757	20	18	7	152	3.31	1525	.900	4
Mike Richter	35	38	2105	13	19	3	134	3.82	1180	.886	1
Corey Hirsch	31	4	224	1	2	1	14	3.75	116	.879	0

^{†}Denotes player spent time with another team before joining Rangers. Stats reflect time with Rangers only.
^{‡}Traded mid-season. Stats reflect time with Rangers only.

Note:

Pos = Position;GP = Games played; G = Goals; A = Assists; Pts = Points; PIM = Penalty minutes; +/- = Plus/minus; PPG = Power-play goals; SHG = Short-handed goals; GWG = Game-winning goals
Pos = Position;GP = Games played; Min, TOI = Minutes played; W = Wins; L = Losses; T,T/OT = Ties; OTL = Overtime losses; GA = Goals-against; GAA = Goals-against average; SO = Shutouts; SA = Shots against; SV = Shots saved;SV% = Save percentage;

== Draft picks ==
New York's picks at the 1992 NHL entry draft in Montreal, Quebec, Canada at the Montreal Forum.

Round	#	Player	Position	Nationality	College/Junior/Club team (League)
1	24	Peter Ferraro	C	United States	Waterloo Black Hawks (USHL)
2	48	Mattias Norstrom	D	Sweden	AIK IF (Elitserien)
3	72	Eric Cairns	LW	Canada	Detroit Compuware Ambassadors (OHL)
4	85	Chris Ferraro	C	United States	Waterloo Black Hawks (USHL)
5	120	Dmitri Starostenko	RW	Belarus	CSKA Moscow (Russia)
6	144	David Dal Grande	D	Canada	Ottawa Jr. Senators (MOJHL)
7	168	Matt Oates	LW	Canada	Miami University (CCHA)
8	192	Mickey Elick	D	Canada	Calgary Canucks (AJHL)
9	216	Daniel Brierley	D	United States	Choate Rosemary Hall (USHS-CT)
10	240	Vladimir Vorobiev	RW	Russia	Metallurg Cherepovets (CIS)
