= 1992–93 Quebec Nordiques season =

National Hockey League team season

1992–93 Quebec Nordiques
- Division: 2nd Adams
- Conference: 3rd Wales
- 1992–93 record: 47–27–10
- Home record: 23–17–2
- Road record: 24–10–8
- Goals for: 351
- Goals against: 300

Team information
- General manager: Pierre Page
- Coach: Pierre Page
- Captain: Joe Sakic
- Alternate captains: Mike Hough; Mike Ricci
- Arena: Colisée de Québec
- Average attendance: 14,981

Team leaders
- Goals: Joe Sakic (48)
- Assists: Mats Sundin (67)
- Points: Mats Sundin (114)
- Penalty minutes: Owen Nolan (185)
- Plus/minus: Curtis Leschyshyn (+25)
- Wins: Ron Hextall (29)
- Goals against average: Stephane Fiset (3.40)

The 1992–93 Quebec Nordiques season was the Nordiques' 22nd season of operation and its 14th in the National Hockey League (NHL). The Nordiques qualified for the playoffs for the first time since the 1986–87 season. Quebec achieved the largest turnaround in NHL history, recording a 52-point improvement from the previous season. Joe Sakic became captain (after a stint as co-captain in 1990–91). Four Nordiques (Owen Nolan, Joe Sakic, Mats Sundin, and Scott Young) reached the 30-goal plateau. Nordiques goaltenders did not record a shutout during the regular season and playoffs. The Nordiques were not shut out in any game during the 84-game regular season and their six-game playoff series. In addition, the Nordiques led all teams in shorthanded goals scored during the regular season (21). The Nordiques also had the best shooting percentage in the league during the regular season, scoring 351 goals on just 2,519 shots (13.9%).

== Offseason ==
=== The Eric Lindros trade ===
Eric Lindros was selected first overall by the Quebec Nordiques in the 1991 NHL entry draft. Lindros had signaled in advance that he would never play for the Nordiques, citing distance, lack of marketing potential, and having to speak French. He went as far as to refuse to wear the team's jersey on draft day; the team selected him anyway.

The president of the Nordiques publicly announced that they would make Lindros the centerpiece of their franchise turnaround, and refused to trade Lindros, saying that he would not have a career in the NHL as long as he held out. Due to Lindros' popularity and hype, it is alleged that the NHL president intervened to get the Nordiques to trade him, as it would otherwise damage the image of the league. During the hold out, Lindros spent the time playing with the Oshawa Generals and also participated in the 1992 Winter Olympics, winning a silver medal.

In 1992, the Nordiques worked out trades for him with both the New York Rangers and Philadelphia Flyers. Eventually an arbitrator, Larry Bertuzzi (grand-uncle of Todd Bertuzzi), ruled in favour of the Flyers, for whom he played from 1992 to 2000, most of the time as the team's captain. The trade between the Nordiques and the Rangers that was ruled invalid by the arbitrator had Lindros being traded for Doug Weight, Tony Amonte, Alexei Kovalev, John Vanbiesbrouck and three first round draft picks (1993, 1994 and 1995) and $12 million.

== Regular season ==
=== Final standings ===
Adams Division
	GP	W	L	T	Pts	GF	GA
**Boston Bruins**	84	51	26	7	**109**	332	268
**Quebec Nordiques**	84	47	27	10	**104**	351	300
**Montreal Canadiens**	84	48	30	6	**102**	326	280
**Buffalo Sabres**	84	38	36	10	**86**	335	297
Hartford Whalers	84	26	52	6	58	284	369
Ottawa Senators	84	10	70	4	24	202	395

Note: GP = Games played, W = Wins, L = Losses, T = Ties, Pts = Points, GF = Goals for, GA = Goals against
Note: Teams that qualified for the playoffs are highlighted in bold.

Wales Conference
R		Div	GP	W	L	T	GF	GA	Pts
**1**	**p – Pittsburgh Penguins**	**PTK**	**84**	**56**	**21**	**7**	**367**	**268**	**119**
**2**	**Boston Bruins**	**ADM**	**84**	**51**	**26**	**7**	**332**	**268**	**109**
**3**	**Quebec Nordiques**	**ADM**	**84**	**47**	**27**	**10**	**351**	**300**	**104**
**4**	**Montreal Canadiens**	**ADM**	**84**	**48**	**30**	**6**	**326**	**280**	**102**
**5**	**Washington Capitals**	**PTK**	**84**	**43**	**34**	**7**	**325**	**286**	**93**
**6**	**New York Islanders**	**PTK**	**84**	**40**	**37**	**7**	**335**	**297**	**87**
**7**	**New Jersey Devils**	**PTK**	**84**	**40**	**37**	**7**	**308**	**299**	**87**
**8**	**Buffalo Sabres**	**ADM**	**84**	**38**	**36**	**10**	**335**	**297**	**86**
9	Philadelphia Flyers	PTK	84	36	37	11	319	319	83
10	New York Rangers	PTK	84	34	39	11	304	308	79
11	Hartford Whalers	ADM	84	26	52	6	284	369	58
12	Ottawa Senators	ADM	84	10	70	4	202	395	24

p – Won Presidents' Trophy (and division)
Divisions: PTK – Patrick, ADM – Adams
bold – Qualified for playoffs

== Playoffs ==
Montreal head coach Jacques Demers held himself to a promise he made to goaltender Patrick Roy earlier in the season and kept him as the starting goaltender despite a couple of weak goals allowed in the first two games of the series against the Nordiques. With the Canadiens staring a potential 3–0 series deficit to the rival Nords in the face, overtime in Game 3 was marked by two disputed goals that were reviewed by the video goal judge. The first review ruled that Stephan Lebeau had knocked the puck in with a high stick, but the second upheld the Habs' winning goal, as it was directed in by the skate of Quebec defenceman Alexei Gusarov, and not that of a Montreal player.

== Schedule and results ==
=== Regular season ===
1992–93 regular season
October: 7–3–1 (home: 4–1–0; road: 3–2–1)

Game	Date	Score	Opponent	Record	Attendance	Recap
1	October 8, 1992	5–4	@ Buffalo Sabres (1992–93)	1–0–0	15,176	W
2	October 10, 1992	9–2	Ottawa Senators (1992–93)	2–0–0	15,399	W
3	October 13, 1992	6–3	Philadelphia Flyers (1992–93)	3–0–0	15,399	W
4	October 15, 1992	4–2	@ Detroit Red Wings (1992–93)	4–0–0	19,683	W
5	October 17, 1992	5–6	St. Louis Blues (1992–93)	4–1–0	15,086	L
6	October 21, 1992	5–5 OT	@ St. Louis Blues (1992–93)	4–1–1	14,862	T
7	October 22, 1992	2–5	@ Minnesota North Stars (1992–93)	4–2–1	12,171	L
8	October 24, 1992	2–3	@ Tampa Bay Lightning (1992–93)	4–3–1	9,528	L
9	October 27, 1992	4–3	Tampa Bay Lightning (1992–93)	5–3–1	14,685	W
10	October 29, 1992	6–3	@ New York Rangers (1992–93)	6–3–1	16,441	W
11	October 31, 1992	3–2	Winnipeg Jets (1992–93)	7–3–1	15,041	W

November: 6–5–4 (home: 4–4–1; road: 2–1–3)

Game	Date	Score	Opponent	Record	Attendance	Recap
12	November 3, 1992	3–3 OT	@ Hartford Whalers (1992–93)	7–3–2	7,723	T
13	November 5, 1992	4–6	@ Boston Bruins (1992–93)	7–4–2	13,898	L
14	November 7, 1992	4–7	Chicago Blackhawks (1992–93)	7–5–2	14,561	L
15	November 8, 1992	5–5 OT	Calgary Flames (1992–93)	7–5–3	14,844	T
16	November 11, 1992	7–3	@ Ottawa Senators (1992–93)	8–5–3	10,500	W
17	November 12, 1992	4–4 OT	@ Pittsburgh Penguins (1992–93)	8–5–4	16,164	T
18	November 14, 1992	6–3	New York Rangers (1992–93)	9–5–4	14,592	W
19	November 17, 1992	3–1	Toronto Maple Leafs (1992–93)	10–5–4	17,026	W
20	November 19, 1992	4–3	Montreal Canadiens (1992–93)	11–5–4	15,399	W
21	November 21, 1992	8–2	Hartford Whalers (1992–93)	12–5–4	14,445	W
22	November 22, 1992	4–6	Washington Capitals (1992–93)	12–6–4	14,679	L
23	November 25, 1992	1–1 OT	@ Buffalo Sabres (1992–93)	12–6–5	14,832	T
24	November 26, 1992	5–4 OT	@ Toronto Maple Leafs (1992–93)	13–6–5	15,505	W
25	November 28, 1992	3–6	New Jersey Devils (1992–93)	13–7–5	14,734	L
26	November 30, 1992	3–4	Boston Bruins (1992–93)	13–8–5	14,328	L

December: 9–4–1 (home: 4–2–0; road: 5–2–1)

Game	Date	Score	Opponent	Record	Attendance	Recap
27	December 3, 1992	2–3 OT	@ Philadelphia Flyers (1992–93)	13–9–5	17,277	L
28	December 5, 1992	4–7	Minnesota North Stars (1992–93)	13–10–5	14,431	L
29	December 7, 1992	4–3	Buffalo Sabres (1992–93)	14–10–5	14,010	W
30	December 10, 1992	5–4	@ Los Angeles Kings (1992–93)	15–10–5	15,221	W
31	December 12, 1992	8–7 OT	@ San Jose Sharks (1992–93)	16–10–5	11,089	W
32	December 13, 1992	3–3 OT	@ Vancouver Canucks (1992–93)	16–10–6	16,150	T
33	December 16, 1992	5–1	@ Montreal Canadiens (1992–93)	17–10–6	17,582	W
34	December 17, 1992	3–8	Montreal Canadiens (1992–93)	17–11–6	15,399	L
35	December 20, 1992	5–3	New York Islanders (1992–93)	18–11–6	14,195	W
36	December 21, 1992	4–7	@ Pittsburgh Penguins (1992–93)	18–12–6	16,164	L
37	December 26, 1992	4–2	Ottawa Senators (1992–93)	19–12–6	15,337	W
38	December 27, 1992	6–1	@ Ottawa Senators (1992–93)	20–12–6	10,500	W
39	December 29, 1992	4–1	New Jersey Devils (1992–93)	21–12–6	15,399	W
40	December 31, 1992	6–2	@ Hartford Whalers (1992–93)	22–12–6	9,403	W

January: 6–4–2 (home: 2–2–1; road: 4–2–1)

Game	Date	Score	Opponent	Record	Attendance	Recap
41	January 2, 1993	2–6	Detroit Red Wings (1992–93)	22–13–6	15,399	L
42	January 5, 1993	2–1	@ New York Islanders (1992–93)	23–13–6	9,168	W
43	January 7, 1993	3–2 OT	@ Boston Bruins (1992–93)	24–13–6	14,128	W
44	January 9, 1993	2–4	@ Hartford Whalers (1992–93)	24–14–6	11,265	L
45	January 14, 1993	3–5	Montreal Canadiens (1992–93)	24–15–6	15,399	L
46	January 16, 1993	4–1	San Jose Sharks (1992–93)	25–15–6	15,147	W
47	January 19, 1993	5–2	@ Ottawa Senators (1992–93)	26–15–6	10,500	W
48	January 22, 1993	2–6	@ Buffalo Sabres (1992–93)	26–16–6	16,325	L
49	January 23, 1993	4–3	Buffalo Sabres (1992–93)	27–16–6	15,399	W
50	January 26, 1993	4–4 OT	Boston Bruins (1992–93)	27–16–7	15,082	T
51	January 28, 1993	6–3	@ Philadelphia Flyers (1992–93)	28–16–7	17,297	W
52	January 29, 1993	3–3 OT	@ Washington Capitals (1992–93)	28–16–8	17,818	T

February: 7–4–1 (home: 4–3–0; road: 3–1–1)

Game	Date	Score	Opponent	Record	Attendance	Recap
53	February 2, 1993	3–2	Los Angeles Kings (1992–93)	29–16–8	14,843	W
54	February 3, 1993	1–4	Boston Bruins (1992–93)	29–17–8	14,287	L
55	February 9, 1993	1–5	Vancouver Canucks (1992–93)	29–18–8	14,360	L
56	February 12, 1993	4–4 OT	@ Calgary Flames (1992–93)	29–18–9	20,214	T
57	February 14, 1993	3–2 OT	@ Edmonton Oilers (1992–93)	30–18–9	17,503	W
58	February 17, 1993	6–4	Ottawa Senators (1992–93)	31–18–9	14,385	W
59	February 20, 1993	5–2	@ Tampa Bay Lightning (1992–93)	32–18–9	9,584	W
60	February 21, 1993	6–3	@ New Jersey Devils (1992–93)	33–18–9	5,246	W
61	February 23, 1993	6–3	Edmonton Oilers (1992–93)	34–18–9	14,012	W
62	February 25, 1993	6–4	New York Islanders (1992–93)	35–18–9	14,486	W
63	February 27, 1993	3–5	Hartford Whalers (1992–93)	35–19–9	15,398	L
64	February 28, 1993	4–6	@ Ottawa Senators (1992–93)	35–20–9	10,500	L

March: 8–4–1 (home: 3–3–0; road: 5–1–1)

Game	Date	Score	Opponent	Record	Attendance	Recap
65	March 2, 1993	7–4	@ Winnipeg Jets (1992–93)	36–20–9	14,397	W
66	March 4, 1993	3–3 OT	@ Chicago Blackhawks (1992–93)	36–20–10	17,490	T
67	March 6, 1993	10–2	New York Rangers (1992–93)	37–20–10	15,399	W
68	March 8, 1993	2–4	Hartford Whalers (1992–93)	37–21–10	15,030	L
69	March 10, 1993	4–7	Buffalo Sabres (1992–93)	37–22–10	15,021	L
70	March 13, 1993	5–2	@ Montreal Canadiens (1992–93)	38–22–10	17,954	W
71	March 15, 1993	4–2	Toronto Maple Leafs (1992–93)	39–22–10	15,399	W
72	March 18, 1993	2–5	Montreal Canadiens (1992–93)	39–23–10	15,399	L
73	March 20, 1993	5–1	@ New Jersey Devils (1992–93)	40–23–10	18,524	W
74	March 23, 1993	1–5	@ Washington Capitals (1992–93)	40–24–10	12,861	L
75	March 27, 1993	8–3	Philadelphia Flyers (1992–93)	41–24–10	15,399	W
76	March 28, 1993	3–2	@ New York Rangers (1992–93)	42–24–10	18,200	W
77	March 31, 1993	6–2	@ Montreal Canadiens (1992–93)	43–24–10	17,959	W

April: 4–3–0 (home: 2–2–0; road: 2–1–0)

Game	Date	Score	Opponent	Record	Attendance	Recap
78	April 1, 1993	4–2	@ Ottawa Senators (1992–93)	44–24–10	10,500	W
79	April 3, 1993	3–5	Pittsburgh Penguins (1992–93)	44–25–10	15,399	L
80	April 6, 1993	1–7	Boston Bruins (1992–93)	44–26–10	15,399	L
81	April 8, 1993	2–6	@ Boston Bruins (1992–93)	44–27–10	14,448	L
82	April 10, 1993	6–3	Hartford Whalers (1992–93)	45–27–10	15,399	W
83	April 11, 1993	3–1	@ Buffalo Sabres (1992–93)	46–27–10	14,003	W
84	April 13, 1993	6–2	Ottawa Senators (1992–93)	47–27–10	15,399	W

Legend: W Win (2 points) L Loss (0 points) T Tie (1 point)

=== Playoffs ===
1993 Stanley Cup playoffs
Adams Division Semifinals vs. (A3) Montreal Canadiens – Canadiens win 4–2

Game	Date	Score	Opponent	Series	Attendance	Recap
1	April 18, 1993	3–2	Montreal Canadiens	Nordiques lead 1–0	15,399	W
2	April 20, 1993	4–1	Montreal Canadiens	Nordiques lead 2–0	15,399	W
3	April 22, 1993	1–2	@ Montreal Canadiens	Nordiques lead 2–1	17,679	L
4	April 24, 1993	2–3	@ Montreal Canadiens	Series tied 2–2	17,955	L
5	April 26, 1993	4–5	Montreal Canadiens	Canadiens lead 3–2	15,399	L
6	April 28, 1993	2–6	@ Montreal Canadiens	Canadiens win 4–2	17,959	L

Legend: W Win L Loss

== Player statistics ==
Regular season
Scoring

Player	Pos	GP	G	A	Pts	PIM	+/-	PPG	SHG	GWG
Mats Sundin	C	80	47	67	114	96	21	13	4	9
Joe Sakic	C	78	48	57	105	40	−3	20	2	4
Steve Duchesne	D	82	20	62	82	57	15	8	0	2
Mike Ricci	C	77	27	51	78	123	8	12	1	10
Owen Nolan	RW	73	36	41	77	185	−1	15	0	4
Andrei Kovalenko	RW	81	27	41	68	57	13	8	1	4
Scott Young	RW	82	30	30	60	20	5	9	6	5
Martin Rucinsky	LW	77	18	30	48	51	16	4	0	1
Valeri Kamensky	LW	32	15	22	37	14	13	2	3	0
Claude Lapointe	LW/C	74	10	26	36	98	5	0	0	1
Curtis Leschyshyn	D	82	9	23	32	61	25	4	0	2
Alexei Gusarov	D	79	8	22	30	57	18	0	2	1
Mike Hough	LW	77	8	22	30	69	−11	2	1	2
Gino Cavallini	LW	67	9	15	24	34	10	0	0	0
Kerry Huffman	D	52	4	18	22	54	0	3	0	0
Adam Foote	D	81	4	12	16	168	6	0	1	0
Scott Pearson	LW	41	13	1	14	95	3	0	0	1
Steven Finn	D	80	5	9	14	160	−3	0	0	0
Bill Lindsay	RW	44	4	9	13	16	0	0	0	0
Tim Hunter	RW	48	5	3	8	94	−4	0	0	0
Mikhail Tatarinov	D	28	2	6	8	28	6	1	0	0
Craig Wolanin	D	24	1	4	5	49	9	0	0	0
Chris Simon	LW	16	1	1	2	67	−2	0	0	1
Stephane Fiset	G	37	0	2	2	2	0	0	0	0
Ron Hextall	G	54	0	2	2	56	0	0	0	0
Tony Twist	LW	34	0	2	2	64	0	0	0	0
Niklas Andersson	LW	3	0	1	1	2	0	0	0	0
Len Esau	D	4	0	1	1	2	1	0	0	0
Dave Karpa	D	12	0	1	1	13	−6	0	0	0
Jacques Cloutier	G	3	0	0	0	0	0	0	0	0

Goaltending

Player	MIN	GP	W	L	T	GA	GAA	SO	SA	SV	SV%
Ron Hextall	2988	54	29	16	5	172	3.45	0	1529	1357	.888
Stephane Fiset	1939	37	18	9	4	110	3.40	0	945	835	.884
Jacques Cloutier	154	3	0	2	1	10	3.90	0	65	55	.846
Team:	5081	84	47	27	10	292	3.45	0	2539	2247	.885

Playoffs
Scoring

Player	Pos	GP	G	A	Pts	PIM	+/-	PPG	SHG	GWG
Joe Sakic	C	6	3	3	6	2	−3	1	0	0
Claude Lapointe	LW/C	6	2	4	6	8	4	0	0	0
Mike Ricci	C	6	0	6	6	8	5	0	0	0
Scott Young	RW	6	4	1	5	0	5	0	0	2
Steve Duchesne	D	6	0	5	5	6	0	0	0	0
Mats Sundin	C	6	3	1	4	6	−4	1	0	0
Curtis Leschyshyn	D	6	1	1	2	6	3	1	0	0
Martin Rucinsky	LW	6	1	1	2	4	−3	1	0	0
Andrei Kovalenko	RW	4	1	0	1	2	−5	0	0	0
Owen Nolan	RW	5	1	0	1	2	−2	0	0	0
Steven Finn	D	6	0	1	1	8	−3	0	0	0
Adam Foote	D	6	0	1	1	2	−3	0	0	0
Alexei Gusarov	D	5	0	1	1	0	−3	0	0	0
Mike Hough	LW	6	0	1	1	2	0	0	0	0
Valeri Kamensky	LW	6	0	1	1	6	−1	0	0	0
Gino Cavallini	LW	4	0	0	0	0	−1	0	0	0
Stephane Fiset	G	1	0	0	0	0	0	0	0	0
Ron Hextall	G	6	0	0	0	0	0	0	0	0
Kerry Huffman	D	3	0	0	0	0	−2	0	0	0
Dave Karpa	D	3	0	0	0	0	0	0	0	0
Scott Pearson	LW	3	0	0	0	0	0	0	0	0
Chris Simon	LW	5	0	0	0	26	−2	0	0	0
Craig Wolanin	D	4	0	0	0	4	1	0	0	0

Goaltending

Player	MIN	GP	W	L	GA	GAA	SO	SA	SV	SV%
Ron Hextall	372	6	2	4	18	2.90	0	211	193	.915
Stephane Fiset	21	1	0	0	1	2.86	0	12	11	.917
Team:	393	6	2	4	19	2.90	0	223	204	.915

Note:

Pos = Position;GP = Games played; G = Goals; A = Assists; Pts = Points; PIM = Penalty minutes; +/- = Plus/minus; PPG = Power-play goals; SHG = Short-handed goals; GWG = Game-winning goals
Pos = Position;GP = Games played; Min, TOI = Minutes played; W = Wins; L = Losses; T,T/OT = Ties; OTL = Overtime losses; GA = Goals-against; GAA = Goals-against average; SO = Shutouts; SA = Shots against; SV = Shots saved;SV% = Save percentage;

== Transactions ==
The Nordiques were involved in the following transactions during the 1992–93 season.

=== Trades ===
June 30, 1992	To Philadelphia Flyers Rights to Eric Lindros	To Quebec Nordiques Steve Duchesne; Ron Hextall; Kerry Huffman; Mike Ricci; Chris Simon; Rights to Peter Forsberg; 1st round pick in 1993 (Jocelyn Thibault); 1st round pick in 1994 (Nolan Baumgartner) $15 million
July 21, 1992	To Toronto Maple Leafs Ken McRae	To Quebec Nordiques Len Esau
August 24, 1992	To Winnipeg Jets Dan Lambert	To Quebec Nordiques Shawn Cronin
September 9, 1992	To Detroit Red Wings Dennis Vial	To Quebec Nordiques Cash
October 27, 1992	To Calgary Flames Future considerations	To Quebec Nordiques Bryan Deasley
February 12, 1993	To Tampa Bay Lightning Herb Raglan	To Quebec Nordiques Michel Mongeau; Martin Simard; Steve Tuttle
June 15, 1993	To Washington Capitals Ken Kaminski	To Quebec Nordiques Mark Matier
June 20, 1993	To New York Islanders Ron Hextall; 1st round pick in 1993 (Todd Bertuzzi)	To Quebec Nordiques Mark Fitzpatrick; 1st round pick in 1993 (Adam Deadmarsh)
June 20, 1993	To Edmonton Oilers Scott Pearson	To Quebec Nordiques Martin Gelinas; 6th round pick in 1993 (Nick Checco)
June 20, 1993	To Washington Capitals Mike Hough	To Quebec Nordiques Reggie Savage; Paul MacDermid

=== Waivers ===
October 4, 1992	To Philadelphia Flyers Shawn Cronin

=== Expansion Draft ===
June 24, 1993	To Florida Panthers Mark Fitzpatrick
June 24, 1993	To Florida Panthers Bill Lindsay

=== Free agents ===
Player	New Team
Dave Marcinyshyn	New York Rangers
Jamie Baker	Ottawa Senators

== Draft picks ==
Quebec's draft picks at the 1992 NHL entry draft in Montreal, Quebec.

Round	#	Player	Nationality	College/junior/club team
1	4	Todd Warriner	Canada	Windsor Spitfires (OHL)
2	28	Paul Brousseau	Canada	Hull Olympiques (QMJHL)
2	29	Tuomas Gronman	Finland	Tacoma Rockets (WHL)
3	52	Manny Fernandez	Canada	Laval Titan (QMJHL)
4	76	Ian McIntyre	Canada	Beauport Harfangs (QMJHL)
5	100	Charlie Wasley	United States	St. Paul Vulcans (NAHL)
6	124	Paxton Schulte	Canada	Spokane Chiefs (WHL)
7	148	Martin Lepage	Canada	Hull Olympiques (QMJHL)
8	172	Mike Jickling	Canada	Spokane Chiefs (WHL)
9	196	Steve Passmore	Canada	Rensselaer Polytechnic Institute (ECAC)
10	220	Anson Carter	Canada	Wexford Raiders (MetJHL)
11	244	Aaron Ellis	United States	Culver Military Academy (USHS-IN)
S	4	Richard Shulmistra	Canada	Miami University (CCHA)
