= 1992–93 Winnipeg Jets season =

NHL hockey team season

1992–93 Winnipeg Jets
- Division: 4th Smythe
- Conference: 7th Campbell
- 1992–93 record: 40–37–7
- Home record: 23–16–3
- Road record: 17–21–4
- Goals for: 322
- Goals against: 320

Team information
- General manager: Mike Smith
- Coach: John Paddock
- Captain: Troy Murray (Oct.–Feb.); Dean Kennedy (Feb.–Apr.)
- Alternate captains: Phil Housley; Thomas Steen
- Arena: Winnipeg Arena
- Average attendance: 13,550

Team leaders
- Goals: Teemu Selanne (76)
- Assists: Phil Housley (79)
- Points: Teemu Selanne (132)
- Penalty minutes: Tie Domi (249)
- Plus/minus: Teemu Selanne (+8)
- Wins: Bob Essensa (33)
- Goals against average: Bob Essensa (3.53)

The 1992–93 Winnipeg Jets season was the Jets' 21st season, their 14th in the National Hockey League (NHL). The Jets qualified for the playoffs, losing in the first round. Winnipeg was not shut out in any of their regular-season games or playoff games.

== Offseason ==
On June 20, 1992, the Jets and Chicago Blackhawks made a trade at the 1992 NHL entry draft, as the Jets acquired the Blackhawks 17th and 27th overall picks for the Jets 12th and 36th overall picks. With their first round, 17th overall pick at the draft, Winnipeg selected Sergei Bautin from Dynamo Moscow. Bautin, a defenceman, had 1 goal and 4 points in 37 games with Dynamo. Other notable players the Jets selected in the draft included Boris Mironov in the second round, and Nikolai Khabibulin in the ninth round.

The club announced 1988 NHL entry draft first-round draft pick Teemu Selanne would join the Jets for the 1992–93 season. He had 39 goals and 62 points in 44 games with Jokerit of the Finnish SM-liiga in 1991–92. He also played for Finland at the 1992 Winter Olympics in Albertville, France, scoring 8 goals and 11 points in 7 games.

On August 24, 1992, Winnipeg traded defenceman Shawn Cronin to the Quebec Nordiques in exchange for Dan Lambert. Lambert had 6 goals and 15 points in 28 games with the Nordiques in the 1991–92 season.

Late in training camp, on October 1, 1992, the Jets traded goaltender Stephane Beauregard to the Philadelphia Flyers in exchange for future considerations. The same day, Winnipeg traded Pat Elyniuk to the Washington Capitals in exchange for John Druce and the Capitals' fourth-round pick in the 1993 NHL entry draft. Druce had 19 goals and 37 points in 67 games with the Capitals in 1991–92, while Elyniuk was coming off a 25-goal and 50-points in 60 games with Winnipeg in 1991–92.

== Regular season ==
Troy Murray was traded in February, and replaced as captain by defenceman Dean Kennedy.

The Jets scored the fewest short-handed goals in the NHL, with three.

=== Final standings ===
Smythe Division
| | GP | W | L | T | Pts | GF | GA |
|---|---|---|---|---|---|---|---|
| **Vancouver Canucks** | 84 | 46 | 29 | 9 | **101** | 346 | 278 |
| **Calgary Flames** | 84 | 43 | 30 | 11 | **97** | 322 | 282 |
| **Los Angeles Kings** | 84 | 39 | 35 | 10 | **88** | 338 | 340 |
| **Winnipeg Jets** | 84 | 40 | 37 | 7 | **87** | 322 | 320 |
| Edmonton Oilers | 84 | 26 | 50 | 8 | 60 | 242 | 337 |
| San Jose Sharks | 84 | 11 | 71 | 2 | 24 | 218 | 414 |

Note: GP = Games played, W = Wins, L = Losses, T = Ties, Pts = Points, GF = Goals for, GA = Goals against
Note: Teams that qualified for the playoffs are highlighted in bold.

== Playoffs ==
The Jets faced the Smythe Division champion, the Vancouver Canucks in the Division Semifinals. The Canucks defeated the Jets in six games.

== Schedule and results ==
=== Regular season ===
1992–93 regular season
October: 4–8–0 (home: 4–2–0; road: 0–6–0)

| Game | Date | Score | Opponent | Record | Recap |
|---|---|---|---|---|---|
| 1 | October 6, 1992 | 4–1 | Detroit Red Wings (1992–93) | 1–0–0 | W |
| 2 | October 8, 1992 | 3–4 OT | @ San Jose Sharks (1992–93) | 1–1–0 | L |
| 3 | October 10, 1992 | 3–6 | @ Los Angeles Kings (1992–93) | 1–2–0 | L |
| 4 | October 12, 1992 | 1–8 | @ Vancouver Canucks (1992–93) | 1–3–0 | L |
| 5 | October 14, 1992 | 7–3 | Edmonton Oilers (1992–93) | 2–3–0 | W |
| 6 | October 16, 1992 | 2–6 | Vancouver Canucks (1992–93) | 2–4–0 | L |
| 7 | October 18, 1992 | 4–5 | @ Philadelphia Flyers (1992–93) | 2–5–0 | L |
| 8 | October 20, 1992 | 3–5 | @ Detroit Red Wings (1992–93) | 2–6–0 | L |
| 9 | October 23, 1992 | 4–2 | Los Angeles Kings (1992–93) | 3–6–0 | W |
| 10 | October 26, 1992 | 6–2 | Washington Capitals (1992–93) | 4–6–0 | W |
| 11 | October 28, 1992 | 5–7 | Calgary Flames (1992–93) | 4–7–0 | L |
| 12 | October 31, 1992 | 2–3 | @ Quebec Nordiques (1992–93) | 4–8–0 | L |

November: 4–5–2 (home: 1–2–2; road: 3–3–0)

| Game | Date | Score | Opponent | Record | Recap |
|---|---|---|---|---|---|
| 13 | November 2, 1992 | 1–2 | @ Montreal Canadiens (1992–93) | 4–9–0 | L |
| 14 | November 6, 1992 | 1–6 | Edmonton Oilers (1992–93) | 4–10–0 | L |
| 15 | November 8, 1992 | 1–6 | @ Vancouver Canucks (1992–93) | 4–11–0 | L |
| 16 | November 10, 1992 | 4–4 OT | Los Angeles Kings (1992–93) | 4–11–1 | T |
| 17 | November 12, 1992 | 7–2 | @ Minnesota North Stars (1992–93) | 5–11–1 | W |
| 18 | November 14, 1992 | 2–4 | @ St. Louis Blues (1992–93) | 5–12–1 | L |
| 19 | November 17, 1992 | 6–5 | @ Tampa Bay Lightning (1992–93) | 6–12–1 | W |
| 20 | November 19, 1992 | 5–3 | @ Detroit Red Wings (1992–93) | 7–12–1 | W |
| 21 | November 21, 1992 | 4–5 | New York Rangers (1992–93) | 7–13–1 | L |
| 22 | November 24, 1992 | 3–3 OT | New York Islanders (1992–93) | 7–13–2 | T |
| 23 | November 27, 1992 | 3–2 OT | San Jose Sharks (1992–93) | 8–13–2 | W |

December: 7–6–1 (home: 5–2–0; road: 2–3–1)

| Game | Date | Score | Opponent | Record | Recap |
|---|---|---|---|---|---|
| 24 | December 2, 1992 | 3–3 OT | @ Calgary Flames (1992–93) | 8–13–3 | T |
| 25 | December 5, 1992 | 2–3 OT | Montreal Canadiens (1992–93) | 8–14–3 | L |
| 26 | December 8, 1992 | 2–5 | @ Pittsburgh Penguins (1992–93) | 8–15–3 | L |
| 27 | December 11, 1992 | 6–8 | @ Washington Capitals (1992–93) | 8–16–3 | L |
| 28 | December 12, 1992 | 4–3 OT | @ New York Islanders (1992–93) | 9–16–3 | W |
| 29 | December 15, 1992 | 4–3 | New Jersey Devils (1992–93) | 10–16–3 | W |
| 30 | December 17, 1992 | 1–5 | @ Chicago Blackhawks (1992–93) | 10–17–3 | L |
| 31 | December 19, 1992 | 1–0 | @ St. Louis Blues (1992–93) | 11–17–3 | W |
| 32 | December 21, 1992 | 5–4 | San Jose Sharks (1992–93) | 12–17–3 | W |
| 33 | December 23, 1992 | 3–4 | Calgary Flames (1992–93) | 12–18–3 | L |
| 34 | December 26, 1992 | 4–5 | @ Minnesota North Stars (1992–93) | 12–19–3 | L |
| 35 | December 27, 1992 | 7–4 | Minnesota North Stars (1992–93) | 13–19–3 | W |
| 36 | December 29, 1992 | 5–4 | Boston Bruins (1992–93) | 14–19–3 | W |
| 37 | December 31, 1992 | 3–2 | Edmonton Oilers (1992–93) | 15–19–3 | W |

January: 10–3–2 (home: 6–0–0; road: 4–3–2)

| Game | Date | Score | Opponent | Record | Recap |
|---|---|---|---|---|---|
| 38 | January 2, 1993 | 2–2 OT | @ New Jersey Devils (1992–93) | 15–19–4 | T |
| 39 | January 3, 1993 | 1–4 | @ Chicago Blackhawks (1992–93) | 15–20–4 | L |
| 40 | January 5, 1993 | 4–2 | @ Calgary Flames (1992–93) | 16–20–4 | W |
| 41 | January 8, 1993 | 6–3 | Los Angeles Kings (1992–93) | 17–20–4 | W |
| 42 | January 10, 1993 | 3–2 | Pittsburgh Penguins (1992–93) | 18–20–4 | W |
| 43 | January 12, 1993 | 4–1 | San Jose Sharks (1992–93) | 19–20–4 | W |
| 44 | January 13, 1993 | 4–1 | @ Edmonton Oilers (1992–93) | 20–20–4 | W |
| 45 | January 16, 1993 | 5–2 | @ Los Angeles Kings (1992–93) | 21–20–4 | W |
| 46 | January 18, 1993 | 8–7 | Hartford Whalers (1992–93) | 22–20–4 | W |
| 47 | January 19, 1993 | 5–2 | Chicago Blackhawks (1992–93) | 23–20–4 | W |
| 48 | January 22, 1993 | 4–4 OT | @ Calgary Flames (1992–93) | 23–20–5 | T |
| 49 | January 23, 1993 | 8–5 | Edmonton Oilers (1992–93) | 24–20–5 | W |
| 50 | January 27, 1993 | 2–5 | @ New York Rangers (1992–93) | 24–21–5 | L |
| 51 | January 28, 1993 | 2–6 | @ Boston Bruins (1992–93) | 24–22–5 | L |
| 52 | January 30, 1993 | 6–3 | @ Hartford Whalers (1992–93) | 25–22–5 | W |

February: 3–7–1 (home: 2–5–0; road: 1–2–1)

| Game | Date | Score | Opponent | Record | Recap |
|---|---|---|---|---|---|
| 53 | February 1, 1993 | 4–4 OT | @ Ottawa Senators (1992–93) | 25–22–6 | T |
| 54 | February 3, 1993 | 2–4 | St. Louis Blues (1992–93) | 25–23–6 | L |
| 55 | February 10, 1993 | 2–6 | Buffalo Sabres (1992–93) | 25–24–6 | L |
| 56 | February 12, 1993 | 2–6 | Hartford Whalers (1992–93) | 25–25–6 | L |
| 57 | February 14, 1993 | 2–3 | San Jose Sharks (1992–93) | 25–26–6 | L |
| 58 | February 18, 1993 | 3–5 | @ San Jose Sharks (1992–93) | 25–27–6 | L |
| 59 | February 20, 1993 | 2–4 | @ Vancouver Canucks (1992–93) | 25–28–6 | L |
| 60 | February 22, 1993 | 6–3 | Ottawa Senators (1992–93) | 26–28–6 | W |
| 61 | February 23, 1993 | 8–2 | @ Ottawa Senators (1992–93) | 27–28–6 | W |
| 62 | February 26, 1993 | 4–7 | Vancouver Canucks (1992–93) | 27–29–6 | L |
| 63 | February 28, 1993 | 7–6 | Minnesota North Stars (1992–93) | 28–29–6 | W |

March: 7–6–1 (home: 3–3–1; road: 4–3–0)

| Game | Date | Score | Opponent | Record | Recap |
|---|---|---|---|---|---|
| 64 | March 2, 1993 | 4–7 | Quebec Nordiques (1992–93) | 28–30–6 | L |
| 65 | March 4, 1993 | 5–3 | @ Edmonton Oilers (1992–93) | 29–30–6 | W |
| 66 | March 6, 1993 | 2–4 | @ Toronto Maple Leafs (1992–93) | 29–31–6 | L |
| 67 | March 7, 1993 | 1–2 | @ Buffalo Sabres (1992–93) | 29–32–6 | L |
| 68 | March 9, 1993 | 4–2 | @ Tampa Bay Lightning (1992–93) | 30–32–6 | W |
| 69 | March 12, 1993 | 2–3 | Vancouver Canucks (1992–93) | 30–33–6 | L |
| 70 | March 14, 1993 | 3–1 | Tampa Bay Lightning (1992–93) | 31–33–6 | W |
| 71 | March 16, 1993 | 4–8 | @ Los Angeles Kings (1992–93) | 31–34–6 | L |
| 72 | March 18, 1993 | 5–2 | @ Vancouver Canucks (1992–93) | 32–34–6 | W |
| 73 | March 21, 1993 | 4–2 | Calgary Flames (1992–93) | 33–34–6 | W |
| 74 | March 23, 1993 | 4–5 | Toronto Maple Leafs (1992–93) | 33–35–6 | L |
| 75 | March 26, 1993 | 4–2 | St. Louis Blues (1992–93) | 34–35–6 | W |
| 76 | March 28, 1993 | 3–3 OT | Los Angeles Kings (1992–93) | 34–35–7 | T |
| 77 | March 30, 1993 | 5–4 | @ Calgary Flames (1992–93) | 35–35–7 | W |

April: 5–2–0 (home: 2–2–0; road: 3–0–0)

| Game | Date | Score | Opponent | Record | Recap |
|---|---|---|---|---|---|
| 78 | April 1, 1993 | 9–5 | @ San Jose Sharks (1992–93) | 36–35–7 | W |
| 79 | April 3, 1993 | 6–4 | @ Edmonton Oilers (1992–93) | 37–35–7 | W |
| 80 | April 6, 1993 | 2–4 | Philadelphia Flyers (1992–93) | 37–36–7 | L |
| 81 | April 8, 1993 | 5–3 | Toronto Maple Leafs (1992–93) | 38–36–7 | W |
| 82 | April 11, 1993 | 7–5 | @ Edmonton Oilers (1992–93) | 39–36–7 | W |
| 83 | April 13, 1993 | 3–5 | Tampa Bay Lightning (1992–93) | 39–37–7 | L |
| 84 | April 15, 1993 | 3–0 | Edmonton Oilers (1992–93) | 40–37–7 | W |

**Legend**: W Win (2 points) L Loss (0 points) T Tie (1 point)

=== Playoffs ===
1993 Stanley Cup playoffs
Smythe Division Semifinals vs. (S1) Vancouver Canucks – Canucks win 4–2

| Game | Date | Score | Opponent | Series | Recap |
|---|---|---|---|---|---|
| 1 | April 19, 1993 | 2–4 | @ Vancouver Canucks | Canucks lead 1–0 | L |
| 2 | April 21, 1993 | 2–3 | @ Vancouver Canucks | Canucks lead 2–0 | L |
| 3 | April 23, 1993 | 5–4 | Vancouver Canucks | Canucks lead 2–1 | W |
| 4 | April 25, 1993 | 1–3 | Vancouver Canucks | Canucks lead 3–1 | L |
| 5 | April 27, 1993 | 4–3 OT | @ Vancouver Canucks | Canucks lead 3–2 | W |
| 6 | April 29, 1993 | 3–4 OT | Vancouver Canucks | Canucks win 4–2 | L |

**Legend**: W Win L Loss

== Player statistics ==
=== Regular season ===
Scoring

| Player | Pos | GP | G | A | Pts | PIM | +/- | PPG | SHG | GWG |
|---|---|---|---|---|---|---|---|---|---|---|
| Teemu Selanne | RW | 84 | 76 | 56 | 132 | 45 | 8 | 24 | 0 | 7 |
| Phil Housley | D | 80 | 18 | 79 | 97 | 52 | -14 | 6 | 0 | 2 |
| Alexei Zhamnov | C | 68 | 25 | 47 | 72 | 58 | 7 | 6 | 1 | 4 |
| Thomas Steen | C | 80 | 22 | 50 | 72 | 75 | -8 | 6 | 0 | 6 |
| Darrin Shannon | LW | 84 | 20 | 40 | 60 | 91 | -4 | 12 | 0 | 2 |
| Fredrik Olausson | D | 68 | 16 | 41 | 57 | 22 | -4 | 11 | 0 | 3 |
| Keith Tkachuk | LW | 83 | 28 | 23 | 51 | 201 | -13 | 12 | 0 | 2 |
| Evgeny Davydov | LW | 79 | 28 | 21 | 49 | 66 | -2 | 7 | 0 | 2 |
| Teppo Numminen | D | 66 | 7 | 30 | 37 | 33 | 4 | 3 | 1 | 0 |
| Luciano Borsato | C | 67 | 15 | 20 | 35 | 38 | -1 | 1 | 1 | 3 |
| Mike Eagles | C/LW | 84 | 8 | 18 | 26 | 131 | -1 | 1 | 0 | 1 |
| Sergei Bautin | D | 71 | 5 | 18 | 23 | 96 | -2 | 0 | 0 | 0 |
| Stu Barnes | C | 38 | 12 | 10 | 22 | 10 | -3 | 3 | 0 | 3 |
| Eddie Olczyk | C | 25 | 8 | 12 | 20 | 26 | -11 | 2 | 0 | 0 |
| John Druce | RW | 50 | 6 | 14 | 20 | 37 | -4 | 0 | 0 | 0 |
| Kris King | LW | 48 | 8 | 8 | 16 | 136 | 5 | 0 | 0 | 1 |
| Bryan Erickson | RW | 41 | 4 | 12 | 16 | 14 | 2 | 2 | 0 | 1 |
| Igor Ulanov | D | 56 | 2 | 14 | 16 | 124 | 6 | 0 | 0 | 0 |
| Tie Domi | RW | 49 | 3 | 10 | 13 | 249 | 2 | 0 | 0 | 0 |
| Mike Lalor | D | 64 | 1 | 8 | 9 | 76 | -10 | 0 | 0 | 0 |
| Dean Kennedy | D | 78 | 1 | 7 | 8 | 105 | -3 | 0 | 0 | 1 |
| Troy Murray | C | 29 | 3 | 4 | 7 | 34 | -15 | 1 | 0 | 0 |
| Bob Essensa | G | 67 | 0 | 5 | 5 | 2 | 0 | 0 | 0 | 0 |
| Russ Romaniuk | LW | 28 | 3 | 1 | 4 | 22 | 0 | 0 | 0 | 1 |
| Randy Carlyle | D | 22 | 1 | 1 | 2 | 14 | -6 | 0 | 0 | 0 |
| Andy Brickley | LW/C | 12 | 0 | 2 | 2 | 2 | 0 | 0 | 0 | 0 |
| Dallas Eakins | D | 14 | 0 | 2 | 2 | 38 | 2 | 0 | 0 | 0 |
| Anatoli Fedotov | D | 1 | 0 | 2 | 2 | 0 | 1 | 0 | 0 | 0 |
| Rob Murray | C | 10 | 1 | 0 | 1 | 6 | 0 | 0 | 0 | 1 |
| Mark Osiecki | D | 4 | 1 | 0 | 1 | 2 | 1 | 1 | 0 | 0 |
| Alan Kerr | RW | 7 | 0 | 1 | 1 | 2 | -4 | 0 | 0 | 0 |
| Scott Levins | C/RW | 9 | 0 | 1 | 1 | 18 | -2 | 0 | 0 | 0 |
| Kris Draper | C | 7 | 0 | 0 | 0 | 2 | -6 | 0 | 0 | 0 |
| Jim Hrivnak | G | 3 | 0 | 0 | 0 | 0 | 0 | 0 | 0 | 0 |
| Bob Joyce | LW | 1 | 0 | 0 | 0 | 0 | 0 | 0 | 0 | 0 |
| John LeBlanc | RW | 3 | 0 | 0 | 0 | 2 | 0 | 0 | 0 | 0 |
| Mike O'Neill | G | 2 | 0 | 0 | 0 | 0 | 0 | 0 | 0 | 0 |
| Rick Tabaracci | G | 19 | 0 | 0 | 0 | 10 | 0 | 0 | 0 | 0 |

Goaltending

| Player | MIN | GP | W | L | T | GA | GAA | SO | SA | SV | SV% |
|---|---|---|---|---|---|---|---|---|---|---|---|
| Bob Essensa | 3855 | 67 | 33 | 26 | 6 | 227 | 3.53 | 2 | 2119 | 1892 | .893 |
| Rick Tabaracci | 959 | 19 | 5 | 10 | 0 | 70 | 4.38 | 0 | 496 | 426 | .859 |
| Jim Hrivnak | 180 | 3 | 2 | 1 | 0 | 13 | 4.33 | 0 | 96 | 83 | .865 |
| Mike O'Neill | 73 | 2 | 0 | 0 | 1 | 6 | 4.93 | 0 | 34 | 28 | .824 |
| Team: | 5067 | 84 | 40 | 37 | 7 | 316 | 3.74 | 2 | 2745 | 2429 | .885 |

=== Playoffs ===
Scoring

| Player | Pos | GP | G | A | Pts | PIM | PPG | SHG | GWG |
|---|---|---|---|---|---|---|---|---|---|
| Phil Housley | D | 6 | 0 | 7 | 7 | 2 | 0 | 0 | 0 |
| Teemu Selanne | RW | 6 | 4 | 2 | 6 | 2 | 2 | 0 | 2 |
| Darrin Shannon | LW | 6 | 2 | 4 | 6 | 6 | 1 | 0 | 0 |
| Keith Tkachuk | LW | 6 | 4 | 0 | 4 | 14 | 1 | 0 | 0 |
| Stu Barnes | C | 6 | 1 | 3 | 4 | 2 | 0 | 0 | 0 |
| Thomas Steen | C | 6 | 1 | 3 | 4 | 2 | 1 | 0 | 0 |
| Andy Brickley | LW/C | 1 | 1 | 1 | 2 | 0 | 0 | 0 | 0 |
| Kris King | LW | 6 | 1 | 1 | 2 | 4 | 0 | 0 | 0 |
| Teppo Numminen | D | 6 | 1 | 1 | 2 | 2 | 1 | 0 | 0 |
| Mike Lalor | D | 4 | 0 | 2 | 2 | 4 | 0 | 0 | 0 |
| Fredrik Olausson | D | 6 | 0 | 2 | 2 | 2 | 0 | 0 | 0 |
| Alexei Zhamnov | C | 6 | 0 | 2 | 2 | 2 | 0 | 0 | 0 |
| Luciano Borsato | C | 6 | 1 | 0 | 1 | 4 | 0 | 1 | 0 |
| Tie Domi | RW | 6 | 1 | 0 | 1 | 23 | 0 | 0 | 0 |
| Mike Eagles | C/LW | 5 | 0 | 1 | 1 | 6 | 0 | 0 | 0 |
| Sergei Bautin | D | 6 | 0 | 0 | 0 | 2 | 0 | 0 | 0 |
| Evgeny Davydov | LW | 4 | 0 | 0 | 0 | 0 | 0 | 0 | 0 |
| John Druce | RW | 2 | 0 | 0 | 0 | 0 | 0 | 0 | 0 |
| Bryan Erickson | RW | 3 | 0 | 0 | 0 | 0 | 0 | 0 | 0 |
| Bob Essensa | G | 6 | 0 | 0 | 0 | 2 | 0 | 0 | 0 |
| Dean Kennedy | D | 6 | 0 | 0 | 0 | 2 | 0 | 0 | 0 |
| Russ Romaniuk | LW | 1 | 0 | 0 | 0 | 0 | 0 | 0 | 0 |
| Igor Ulanov | D | 4 | 0 | 0 | 0 | 4 | 0 | 0 | 0 |

Goaltending

| Player | MIN | GP | W | L | GA | GAA | SO | SA | SV | SV% |
|---|---|---|---|---|---|---|---|---|---|---|
| Bob Essensa | 367 | 6 | 2 | 4 | 20 | 3.27 | 0 | 183 | 163 | .891 |
| Team: | 367 | 6 | 2 | 4 | 20 | 3.27 | 0 | 183 | 163 | .891 |

Note:

Pos = Position;GP = Games played; G = Goals; A = Assists; Pts = Points; PIM = Penalty minutes; +/- = Plus/minus; PPG = Power-play goals; SHG = Short-handed goals; GWG = Game-winning goals
Pos = Position;GP = Games played; Min, TOI = Minutes played; W = Wins; L = Losses; T,T/OT = Ties; OTL = Overtime losses; GA = Goals-against; GAA = Goals-against average; SO = Shutouts; SA = Shots against; SV = Shots saved;SV% = Save percentage;

== Transactions ==
=== Trades ===
| August 10, 1992 | To Chicago Blackhawks Christian Ruuttu | To Winnipeg Jets Stephane Beauregard |
| August 24, 1992 | To Quebec Nordiques Shawn Cronin | To Winnipeg Jets Dan Lambert |
| October 1, 1992 | To Philadelphia Flyers Stephane Beauregard | To Winnipeg Jets Future considerations |
| October 1, 1992 | To Washington Capitals Pat Elynuik | To Winnipeg Jets John Druce; 4th round pick in 1993 (John Jakopin) |
| December 28, 1992 | To New York Rangers Ed Olczyk | To Winnipeg Jets Tie Domi; Kris King |
| February 21, 1993 | To Chicago Blackhawks Troy Murray | To Winnipeg Jets Steve Bancroft; 11th round pick in 1993 (Russ Hewson) |
| February 22, 1993 | To New York Islanders Rick Hayward | To Winnipeg Jets Future considerations |
| March 4, 1993 | To Ottawa Senators Dmitri Filimonov | To Winnipeg Jets 4th round pick in 1993 (Ruslan Batyrshin) |
| March 20, 1993 | To Minnesota North Stars Mark Osiecki; 10th round pick in 1993 (Bill Lang) | To Winnipeg Jets 9th round pick in 1993 (Vladimir Potapov) |
| March 22, 1993 | To Vancouver Canucks Dan Ratushny | To Winnipeg Jets 9th round pick in 1993 (Harijs Vitolinsh) |
| March 22, 1993 | To Washington Capitals Rick Tabaracci | To Winnipeg Jets Jim Hrivnak; 2nd round pick in 1993 (Alexei Budayev) |
| June 11, 1993 | To Detroit Red Wings Aaron Ward; 4th round pick in 1993 (John Jakopin) | To Winnipeg Jets Paul Ysebaert; Alan Kerr |
| June 11, 1993 | To Philadelphia Flyers Future considerations | To Winnipeg Jets Stephane Beauregard |
| June 26, 1993 | To Florida Panthers 2nd round pick in 1993 (Kevin Weekes); 3rd round pick in 1993 (Mikael Tjallden) | To Winnipeg Jets 2nd round pick in 1993 (Scott Langkow) |

=== Waivers ===
| February 20, 1993 | From Ottawa Senators Mark Osiecki |

=== Free agents ===
| **Player** | **Former team** |
| Rick Hayward | Los Angeles Kings |
| Alan Stewart | Boston Bruins |
| Andy Brickley | Boston Bruins |

== Draft picks ==
Winnipeg's draft picks at the 1992 NHL entry draft held at the Montreal Forum in Montreal, Quebec.

| Round | # | Player | Nationality | College/Junior/Club team (League) |
|---|---|---|---|---|
| 1 | 17 | Sergei Bautin | Russia | Dynamo Moscow (Russia) |
| 2 | 27 | Boris Mironov | Russia | CSKA Moscow (Russia) |
| 3 | 60 | Jeremy Stevenson | United States | Cornwall Royals (OHL) |
| 4 | 84 | Mark Visheau | Canada | London Knights (OHL) |
| 6 | 132 | Alexander Alexeyev | Ukraine | Sokil Kyiv (Ukraine) |
| 7 | 155 | Artur Oktyabrev | Russia | CSKA Moscow (Russia) |
| 7 | 156 | Andrei Raisky | Kazakhstan | Torpedo Ust-Kamenogorsk (Kazakhstan) |
| 9 | 204 | Nikolai Khabibulin | Russia | CSKA Moscow (Russia) |
| 10 | 228 | Evgeny Garanin | Russia | Khimik Voskresensk (Russia) |
| 10 | 229 | Teemu Numminen | Finland | Stoneham High School (USHS-MA) |
| 11 | 252 | Andrei Karpovtsev | Russia | Dynamo Moscow (Russia) |
| 11 | 254 | Ivan Vologjaninov | Russia | Sokil Kyiv (Ukraine) |

== See also ==
- 1992–93 NHL season
