= 1992–93 Tampa Bay Lightning season =

National Hockey League team season

1992–93 Tampa Bay Lightning
- Division: 6th Norris
- Conference: 11th Campbell
- 1992–93 record: 23–54–7
- Home record: 12–27–3
- Road record: 11–27–4
- Goals for: 245
- Goals against: 332

Team information
- General manager: Phil Esposito
- Coach: Terry Crisp
- Captain: Vacant
- Alternate captains: Brian Bradley; John Tucker; Rob Ramage
- Arena: Expo Hall
- Average attendance: 10,014
- Minor league affiliates: Atlanta Knights (IHL); Louisville Icehawks (ECHL)

Team leaders
- Goals: Brian Bradley (42)
- Assists: Brian Bradley (44)
- Points: Brian Bradley (86)
- Penalty minutes: Mike Hartman (154)
- Plus/minus: Peter Taglianetti (+8)
- Wins: Jean-Claude Bergeron and Pat Jablonski (8)
- Goals against average: Jean-Claude Bergeron and Wendell Young (3.66)

The 1992–93 Tampa Bay Lightning season was the team's inaugural season in the National Hockey League (NHL). They finished sixth in the Norris Division with a record of 23 wins, 54 losses, and 7 ties for 53 points.

== Offseason ==
Hockey Hall of Famer Phil Esposito was hired as president and general manager on April 4, 1991.

Terry Crisp was named the team's first head coach on April 23, 1992.

== Preseason ==
On September 23, 1992, Manon Rheaume became the first woman to play in an NHL exhibition game as the Tampa Bay Lightning played against the St. Louis Blues.

== Regular season ==
The Lightning finished last in penalty-kill % during the regular season (74.43%).

In the Lightning's very first NHL game on Wednesday, October 7, 1992, Chris Kontos scored the first hat trick in Lightning history as Tampa Bay defeated the Chicago Blackhawks 7-3 (the 7 goals would be the most that the Blackhawks would allow in a regular-season game that year). On Friday, November 13, 1992, Pat Jablonski recorded the first shutout in Lightning history, as Tampa Bay blanked their fellow expansion cousins the Ottawa Senators 1-0 at home.

Although the Lightning finished well out of playoff contention, their 53 points was by far the best inaugural season performance of any of the three expansion teams that joined in the early 1990s. Tampa Bay's 53 points was actually more than the combined totals for that season of the Senators and the San Jose Sharks (who were then in their second season), both of whom recorded only 24 points each.

=== Final standings ===
Norris Division
	GP	W	L	T	Pts	GF	GA
**Chicago Blackhawks**	84	47	25	12	**106**	279	230
**Detroit Red Wings**	84	47	28	9	**103**	369	280
**Toronto Maple Leafs**	84	44	29	11	**99**	288	241
**St. Louis Blues**	84	37	36	11	**85**	282	278
Minnesota North Stars	84	36	38	10	82	272	293
Tampa Bay Lightning	84	23	54	7	53	245	332

Note: GP = Games played, W = Wins, L = Losses, T = Ties, Pts = Points, GF = Goals for, GA = Goals against
Note: Teams that qualified for the playoffs are highlighted in bold.

== Schedule and results ==
1992–93 regular season
October: 4–7–1 (home: 3–2–0; road: 1–5–1)

Game	Date	Score	Opponent	Record	Recap
1	October 7, 1992	7–3	Chicago Blackhawks (1992–93)	1–0–0	W
2	October 10, 1992	1–2	@ Minnesota North Stars (1992–93)	1–1–0	L
3	October 11, 1992	4–4 OT	@ Chicago Blackhawks (1992–93)	1–1–1	T
4	October 13, 1992	2–1	@ St. Louis Blues (1992–93)	2–1–1	W
5	October 15, 1992	3–5	@ Toronto Maple Leafs (1992–93)	2–2–1	L
6	October 16, 1992	4–5 OT	@ Buffalo Sabres (1992–93)	2–3–1	L
7	October 20, 1992	6–1	Edmonton Oilers (1992–93)	3–3–1	W
8	October 22, 1992	2–5	Toronto Maple Leafs (1992–93)	3–4–1	L
9	October 24, 1992	3–2	Quebec Nordiques (1992–93)	4–4–1	W
10	October 27, 1992	3–4	@ Quebec Nordiques (1992–93)	4–5–1	L
11	October 28, 1992	3–4	@ Montreal Canadiens (1992–93)	4–6–1	L
12	October 30, 1992	1–2	San Jose Sharks (1992–93)	4–7–1	L

November: 6–8–1 (home: 3–4–0; road: 3–4–1)

Game	Date	Score	Opponent	Record	Recap
13	November 1, 1992	4–5	Pittsburgh Penguins (1992–93)	4–8–1	L
14	November 3, 1992	6–4	St. Louis Blues (1992–93)	5–8–1	W
15	November 6, 1992	2–2 OT	@ Washington Capitals (1992–93)	5–8–2	T
16	November 7, 1992	6–5 OT	@ New York Islanders (1992–93)	6–8–2	W
17	November 9, 1992	5–1	@ New York Rangers (1992–93)	7–8–2	W
18	November 11, 1992	6–4	Detroit Red Wings (1992–93)	8–8–2	W
19	November 13, 1992	1–0	Ottawa Senators (1992–93)	9–8–2	W
20	November 14, 1992	3–5	Calgary Flames (1992–93)	9–9–2	L
21	November 17, 1992	5–6	Winnipeg Jets (1992–93)	9–10–2	L
22	November 19, 1992	1–4	Minnesota North Stars (1992–93)	9–11–2	L
23	November 21, 1992	2–4	@ St. Louis Blues (1992–93)	9–12–2	L
24	November 23, 1992	5–10	@ Detroit Red Wings (1992–93)	9–13–2	L
25	November 24, 1992	3–2	@ Toronto Maple Leafs (1992–93)	10–13–2	W
26	November 27, 1992	2–3 OT	@ Calgary Flames (1992–93)	10–14–2	L
27	November 28, 1992	3–4 OT	@ Edmonton Oilers (1992–93)	10–15–2	L

December: 4–8–0 (home: 2–4–0; road: 2–4–0)

Game	Date	Score	Opponent	Record	Recap
28	December 5, 1992	7–9	Detroit Red Wings (1992–93)	10–16–2	L
29	December 7, 1992	1–6	New York Islanders (1992–93)	10–17–2	L
30	December 9, 1992	5–6	@ New York Rangers (1992–93)	10–18–2	L
31	December 11, 1992	4–5	New York Rangers (1992–93)	10–19–2	L
32	December 12, 1992	3–1	Edmonton Oilers (1992–93)	11–19–2	W
33	December 15, 1992	3–2	@ Los Angeles Kings (1992–93)	12–19–2	W
34	December 16, 1992	5–4 OT	@ San Jose Sharks (1992–93)	13–19–2	W
35	December 18, 1992	0–2	New Jersey Devils (1992–93)	13–20–2	L
36	December 20, 1992	4–1	Philadelphia Flyers (1992–93)	14–20–2	W
37	December 22, 1992	3–5	@ Boston Bruins (1992–93)	14–21–2	L
38	December 23, 1992	1–3	@ Hartford Whalers (1992–93)	14–22–2	L
39	December 31, 1992	0–5	@ Chicago Blackhawks (1992–93)	14–23–2	L

January: 3–10–1 (home: 1–5–1; road: 2–5–0)

Game	Date	Score	Opponent	Record	Recap
40	January 2, 1993	1–2	@ Edmonton Oilers (1992–93)	14–24–2	L
41	January 4, 1993	0–7	@ Vancouver Canucks (1992–93)	14–25–2	L
42	January 6, 1993	6–3	@ Los Angeles Kings (1992–93)	15–25–2	W
43	January 9, 1993	4–6	@ Minnesota North Stars (1992–93)	15–26–2	L
44	January 11, 1993	2–4	@ Toronto Maple Leafs (1992–93)	15–27–2	L
45	January 13, 1993	3–5	@ Detroit Red Wings (1992–93)	15–28–2	L
46	January 16, 1993	3–5	St. Louis Blues (1992–93)	15–29–2	L
47	January 17, 1993	3–5	Washington Capitals (1992–93)	15–30–2	L
48	January 19, 1993	2–4	Minnesota North Stars (1992–93)	15–31–2	L
49	January 21, 1993	1–6	Toronto Maple Leafs (1992–93)	15–32–2	L
50	January 23, 1993	5–1	San Jose Sharks (1992–93)	16–32–2	W
51	January 24, 1993	2–2 OT	Minnesota North Stars (1992–93)	16–32–3	T
52	January 28, 1993	2–4	St. Louis Blues (1992–93)	16–33–3	L
53	January 30, 1993	4–3	@ Minnesota North Stars (1992–93)	17–33–3	W

February: 2–7–2 (home: 1–4–1; road: 1–3–1)

Game	Date	Score	Opponent	Record	Recap
54	February 1, 1993	5–4	@ San Jose Sharks (1992–93)	18–33–3	W
55	February 3, 1993	2–4	@ Vancouver Canucks (1992–93)	18–34–3	L
56	February 9, 1993	3–1	Toronto Maple Leafs (1992–93)	19–34–3	W
57	February 11, 1993	0–1	Minnesota North Stars (1992–93)	19–35–3	L
58	February 14, 1993	3–3 OT	Boston Bruins (1992–93)	19–35–4	T
59	February 17, 1993	1–3	@ Detroit Red Wings (1992–93)	19–36–4	L
60	February 19, 1993	1–4	@ Toronto Maple Leafs (1992–93)	19–37–4	L
61	February 20, 1993	2–5	Quebec Nordiques (1992–93)	19–38–4	L
62	February 22, 1993	2–5	Los Angeles Kings (1992–93)	19–39–4	L
63	February 25, 1993	1–5	Chicago Blackhawks (1992–93)	19–40–4	L
64	February 27, 1993	3–3 OT	@ Pittsburgh Penguins (1992–93)	19–40–5	T

March: 3–9–0 (home: 2–5–0; road: 1–4–0)

Game	Date	Score	Opponent	Record	Recap
65	March 3, 1993	3–1	Montreal Canadiens (1992–93)	20–40–5	W
66	March 6, 1993	7–4	Calgary Flames (1992–93)	21–40–5	W
67	March 9, 1993	2–4	Winnipeg Jets (1992–93)	21–41–5	L
68	March 12, 1993	2–8	@ Toronto Maple Leafs (1992–93)	21–42–5	L
69	March 14, 1993	1–3	@ Winnipeg Jets (1992–93)	21–43–5	L
70	March 16, 1993	3–4 OT	Hartford Whalers (1992–93)	21–44–5	L
71	March 18, 1993	2–4	Toronto Maple Leafs (1992–93)	21–45–5	L
72	March 20, 1993	1–3	Buffalo Sabres (1992–93)	21–46–5	L
73	March 21, 1993	2–3	@ Chicago Blackhawks (1992–93)	21–47–5	L
74	March 23, 1993	3–9	@ New Jersey Devils (1992–93)	21–48–5	L
75	March 25, 1993	3–2 OT	@ Ottawa Senators (1992–93)	22–48–5	W
76	March 27, 1993	3–8	Detroit Red Wings (1992–93)	22–49–5	L

April: 1–5–2 (home: 0–3–1; road: 1–2–1)

Game	Date	Score	Opponent	Record	Recap
77	April 1, 1993	3–5	Vancouver Canucks (1992–93)	22–50–5	L
78	April 3, 1993	2–6	@ Philadelphia Flyers (1992–93)	22–51–5	L
79	April 6, 1993	2–2 OT	St. Louis Blues (1992–93)	22–51–6	T
80	April 8, 1993	1–9	Detroit Red Wings (1992–93)	22–52–6	L
81	April 10, 1993	2–4	Chicago Blackhawks (1992–93)	22–53–6	L
82	April 11, 1993	3–3 OT	@ Chicago Blackhawks (1992–93)	22–53–7	T
83	April 13, 1993	5–3	@ Winnipeg Jets (1992–93)	23–53–7	W
84	April 15, 1993	5–6	@ St. Louis Blues (1992–93)	23–54–7	L

Legend: W Win (2 points) L Loss (0 points) T Tie (1 point)

== Player statistics ==
=== Skaters ===
Regular season
Player	GP	G	A	Pts	+/−	PIM
Brian Bradley	80	42	44	86	-24	92
John Tucker	78	17	39	56	-12	69
Chris Kontos	66	27	24	51	-7	12
Rob Zamuner	84	15	28	43	-25	74
Adam Creighton	83	19	20	39	-19	110
Shawn Chambers	55	10	29	39	-21	36
Bob Beers	64	12	24	36	-25	70
Marc Bureau	63	10	21	31	-12	111
Doug Crossman ‡	40	8	21	29	-4	18
Mikael Andersson	77	16	11	27	-14	14
Danton Cole	67	12	15	27	-2	23
Rob DiMaio	54	9	15	24	0	62
Roman Hamrlik	67	6	15	21	-21	71
Steve Maltais	63	7	13	20	-20	35
Rob Ramage ‡	66	5	12	17	-21	138
Marc Bergevin	78	2	12	14	-16	66
Joe Reekie	42	2	11	13	2	69
Ken Hodge Jr.	25	2	7	9	-6	2
Peter Taglianetti ‡	61	1	8	9	8	150
Mike Hartman ‡	58	4	4	8	-7	154
Steve Kasper †	47	3	4	7	-13	18
Tim Bergland	27	3	3	6	-5	11
Jason Lafreniere	11	3	3	6	-6	4
Basil McRae ‡	14	2	3	5	-3	71
Anatoli Semenov ‡	13	2	3	5	-5	4
Chris LiPuma	15	0	5	5	1	34
Matt Hervey	17	0	4	4	-6	38
Stan Drulia	24	2	1	3	1	10
Jock Callander	8	1	1	2	-5	2
Dave Capuano	6	1	1	2	-4	2
Michel Mongeau	4	1	1	2	-2	2
Keith Osborne	11	1	1	2	-1	8
Randy Gilhen †	11	0	2	2	-6	6
Shawn Rivers	4	0	2	2	-2	2
Shayne Stevenson	8	0	1	1	-5	7
Alain Cote	2	0	0	0	-1	0
Herb Raglan	2	0	0	0	0	2
Stephane Richer ‡	3	0	0	0	-3	0
Jason Ruff †	1	0	0	0	0	0
Martin Simard	7	0	0	0	-1	11
Total		245	408	653	—	1,608

=== Goaltenders ===
Regular season
Player	GP	GS	TOI	W	L	T	GA	GAA	SA	SV%	SO	G	A	PIM
Jean-Claude Bergeron	21	19	1,163:10	8	10	1	71	3.66	574	.876	0	0	1	2
Pat Jablonski	43	37	2,267:49	8	24	4	150	3.97	1,194	.874	1	0	2	7
Wendell Young	31	27	1,591:29	7	19	2	97	3.66	758	.872	0	0	2	2
David Littman	1	1	45:27	0	1	0	7	9.24	21	.667	0	0	0	0
Total			5,067:55	23	54	7	325	3.85	2,547	.872	1	0	5	11

† Denotes player spent time with another team before joining the Lightning. Stats reflect time with the Lightning only.
‡ Denotes player was traded mid-season. Stats reflect time with the Lightning only.

Note: GP = Games played; G = Goals; A = Assists; Pts = Points; +/- = plus/minus; PIM = Penalty minutes;
TOI = Time on ice; W = Wins; L = Losses; T = Ties; GA = Goals-against; GAA = Goals-against average; SO = Shutouts; SA = Shots against; SV% = Save percentage;

== Awards and honors ==
- Brian Bradley, 44th NHL All-Star Game

== Transactions ==
=== Trades ===
Trades listed are from June 1, 1992 to June 1, 1993.

Date	Details	
June 18, 1992	To Montreal Canadiens Frederic Chabot	To Tampa Bay Lightning Jean-Claude Bergeron
June 19, 1992	To Winnipeg Jets Future considerations	To Tampa Bay Lightning Danton Cole
June 19, 1992	To Quebec Nordiques Tim Hunter	To Tampa Bay Lightning Future considerations (Martin Simard on September 14, 1992)
June 19, 1992	To St. Louis Blues 1994 4th-round pick (86th overall); 1995 5th-round pick (108th overall); 1996 6th-round pick (152nd overall)	To Tampa Bay Lightning Pat Jablonski; Darin Kimble; Rob Robinson; Steve Tuttle
September 4, 1992	To Boston Bruins Darin Kimble; Future considerations	To Tampa Bay Lightning Matt Hervey; Ken Hodge Jr.
September 25, 1992	To Edmonton Oilers Jeff Bloemberg	To Tampa Bay Lightning Future considerations
October 4, 1992	To New York Islanders 1994 5th-round pick (112th overall)	To Tampa Bay Lightning Islanders agree to leave Adam Creighton unprotected in the 1992 waiver draft
October 28, 1992	To Boston Bruins Stephane Richer	To Tampa Bay Lightning Bob Beers
November 3, 1992	To Vancouver Canucks Anatoli Semenov	To Tampa Bay Lightning Dave Capuano; 1994 4th-round pick (91st overall)
December 8, 1992	To Philadelphia Flyers Dan Vincelette	To Tampa Bay Lightning Steve Kasper
January 28, 1993	To St. Louis Blues Basil McRae; Doug Crossman; 1996 4th-round pick (97th overall)	To Tampa Bay Lightning Jason Ruff; 1994 TB 4th-round pick (86th overall); 1995 TB 5th-round pick (108th overall); 1996 TB 6th-round pick (152nd overall)
February 12, 1993	To Quebec Nordiques Michel Mongeau; Martin Simard; Steve Tuttle	To Tampa Bay Lightning Herb Raglan
March 20, 1993	To Montreal Canadiens Rob Ramage	To Tampa Bay Lightning Eric Charron; Alain Cote; Future Considerations (Donald Dufresne on June 18, 1993)
March 22, 1993	To Pittsburgh Penguins Peter Taglianetti	To Tampa Bay Lightning 1993 3rd-round pick (78th overall)
March 22, 1993	To New York Rangers Mike Hartman	To Tampa Bay Lightning Randy Gilhen

=== Additions ===
Date	Player	Via	Previous Team	Ref
June 29, 1992	Chris LiPuma	Free agency		
July 8, 1992	Mikael Andersson	Free agency	Hartford Whalers	
July 9, 1992	Marc Bergevin	Free agency	Hartford Whalers	
July 13, 1992	Rob Zamuner	Free agency (Note: Zamuner was a restricted free agent. After an arbitrator ruling, Tampa Bay gave their third round pick in the 1993 Draft to the Rangers as compensation.)	New York Rangers	
July 22, 1992	Jean Blouin	Free agency	Laval Titan (QMJHL)	
July 22, 1992	Chris Kontos	Free agency	Courmaosta HC (ITA)	
July 22, 1992	John Tucker	Free agency	Asiago HC (ITA)	
July 29, 1992	Jock Callander	Free agency	Pittsburgh Penguins	
July 29, 1992	Jason Lafreniere	Free agency	Landshut EV (GER)	
July 29, 1992	Mike Greenlay	Free agency	Knoxville Cherokees (ECHL)	
July 29, 1992	Stephane Richer	Free agency	Fredericton Canadiens (AHL)	
August 13, 1992	Scott Boston	Free agency	Belleville Bulls (OHL)	
August 13, 1992	Jeff Buchanan	Free agency	Saskatoon Blades (WHL)	
August 13, 1992	Christian Campeau	Free agency	Rouen (FRA)	
August 13, 1992	Shawn Rivers	Free agency	Sudbury Wolves (OHL)	
August 18, 1992	Mark Green	Free agency		
August 21, 1992	Jim Benning	Free agency		
August 27, 1992	David Littman	Free agency		
September 1, 1992	Stan Drulia	Free agency	New Haven Nighthawks (AHL)	
September 1, 1992	Rick Lanz	Free agency		
October 4, 1992	Adam Creighton	Waiver draft	New York Islanders	
October 16, 1992	Marc Bureau	Waivers	Minnesota North Stars	

=== Departures ===
Date	Player	Via	New Team	Ref
September 9, 1992	Bob McGill	Waivers	Toronto Maple Leafs	
January 19, 1993	Ken Hodge Jr.	Released	New York Rangers	
February 7, 1993	Rick Lanz	Retired		

== Draft picks ==
=== Expansion draft ===
#	Player	Position	Drafted from
1	Wendell Young	G	Pittsburgh Penguins
4	Frederic Chabot	G	Montreal Canadiens
6	Joe Reekie	D	New York Islanders
7	Shawn Chambers	D	Washington Capitals
9	Peter Taglianetti	D	Pittsburgh Penguins
12	Bob McGill	D	Detroit Red Wings
14	Jeff Bloemberg	D	New York Rangers
15	Doug Crossman	D	Quebec Nordiques
17	Rob Ramage	D	Minnesota North Stars
19	Michel Mongeau	C	St. Louis Blues
22	Anatoli Semenov	C	Edmonton Oilers
24	Mike Hartman	LW	Winnipeg Jets
26	Basil McRae	LW	Minnesota North Stars
28	Rob DiMaio	RW	New York Islanders
30	Steve Maltais	W	Quebec Nordiques
32	Dan Vincelette	LW	Chicago Blackhawks
34	Tim Bergland	RW	Washington Capitals
36	Brian Bradley	C	Toronto Maple Leafs
38	Keith Osborne	RW	Toronto Maple Leafs
40	Shayne Stevenson	C	Boston Bruins
42	Tim Hunter	F	Calgary Flames

=== Entry draft ===
Tampa Bay's draft picks at the 1992 NHL entry draft held at the Montreal Forum in Montreal, Quebec.

Round	#	Player	Position	Nationality	College/Junior/Club team (League)
1	1	Roman Hamrlik	D	Czechoslovakia	ZPS Zlín (Czechoslovakia)
2	26	Drew Bannister	D	Canada	Sault Ste. Marie Greyhounds (OHL)
3	49	Brent Gretzky	C	Canada	Belleville Bulls (OHL)
4	74	Aaron Gavey	C	Canada	Sault Ste. Marie Greyhounds (OHL)
5	97	Brantt Myhres	LW	Canada	Lethbridge Hurricanes (WHL)
6	122	Martin Tanguay	C	Canada	Verdun Collège Français (QMJHL)
7	145	Derek Wilkinson	G	Canada	Detroit Whalers (OHL)
8	170	Dennis Maxwell	C	United States	Niagara Falls Thunder (OHL)
9	193	Andrew Kemper	D	Canada	Seattle Thunderbirds (WHL)
10	218	Marc Tardiff	LW	Canada	Shawinigan Cataractes (QMJHL)
11	241	Tom MacDonald	C	Canada	Sault Ste. Marie Greyhounds (OHL)
S	1	Cory Cross	D	Canada	University of Alberta (CWUAA)
