= 1992–93 Calgary Flames season =

NHL team season

1992–93 Calgary Flames
- Division: 2nd Smythe
- Conference: 5th Campbell
- 1992–93 record: 43–30–11
- Home record: 23–14–5
- Road record: 20–16–6
- Goals for: 322
- Goals against: 282

Team information
- General manager: Doug Risebrough
- Coach: Dave King
- Captain: Joe Nieuwendyk
- Alternate captains: Al MacInnis; Joel Otto
- Arena: Olympic Saddledome
- Average attendance: 19,529

Team leaders
- Goals: Robert Reichel (40)
- Assists: Theoren Fleury (66)
- Points: Theoren Fleury (100)
- Penalty minutes: Craig Berube (209)
- Plus/minus: Gary Roberts (+32)
- Wins: Mike Vernon (29)
- Goals against average: Jeff Reese (3.20)

The 1992–93 Calgary Flames season was the 13th National Hockey League season in Calgary. The Flames rebounded from their disappointing 1991–92 season, finishing 2nd in the Smythe Division, four points behind the Vancouver Canucks.

The Flames met the Los Angeles Kings in the Smythe Division semifinals. The series was an offensive showdown, with the Flames setting team records for most goals scored in a six-game series (28) and most goals against (33). The Flames once again failed to win a playoff series, falling in six games.

Two Flames represented the Campbell Conference at the 1993 All-Star Game: Forward Gary Roberts and goaltender Mike Vernon.

On February 10, 1993, the Flames set numerous franchise and league records in a 13–1 victory over the San Jose Sharks. In addition to being a team record for goals scored at 13, the score also represents the largest margin of victory in team history (12). Calgary set a new team mark for fastest four goals scored (1:21). Jeff Reese set an NHL record for points in one game by a goaltender with 3 assists, while Theoren Fleury set a league record by going +9 in this game. All of these records remain today.

Four Flames (Theoren Fleury, Joe Nieuwendyk, Robert Reichel and Gary Roberts) reached the 30-goal plateau.

Prior to the season, the Flames lost two players in the 1992 NHL expansion draft, as left winger Chris Lindberg was selected by the Ottawa Senators 35th overall, and forward Tim Hunter went to the Tampa Bay Lightning 42nd overall.

== Regular season ==
=== Season standings ===
Smythe Division
	GP	W	L	T	Pts	GF	GA
**Vancouver Canucks**	84	46	29	9	**101**	346	278
**Calgary Flames**	84	43	30	11	**97**	322	282
**Los Angeles Kings**	84	39	35	10	**88**	338	340
**Winnipeg Jets**	84	40	37	7	**87**	322	320
Edmonton Oilers	84	26	50	8	60	242	337
San Jose Sharks	84	11	71	2	24	218	414

Note: GP = Games played, W = Wins, L = Losses, T = Ties, Pts = Points, GF = Goals for, GA = Goals against
Note: Teams that qualified for the playoffs are highlighted in bold.

== Schedule and results ==
=== Regular season ===
1992–93 regular season
October: 8–4–0 (home: 4–3–0; road: 4–1–0)

Game	Date	Visitor	Score	Home	OT	Record	Pts	Recap
1	October 6	Los Angeles	5 – 4	Calgary		0–1–0	0	L
2	October 8	Edmonton	2 – 7	Calgary		1–1–0	2	W
3	October 10	Toronto	2 – 3	Calgary		2–1–0	4	W
4	October 13 (at Saskatoon, SK)	Calgary	4 – 3	Minnesota		3–1–0	6	W
5	October 15	Calgary	0 – 4	Los Angeles		3–2–0	6	L
6	October 17	Calgary	6 – 2	San Jose		4–2–0	8	W
7	October 20	Los Angeles	2 – 6	Calgary		5–2–0	10	W
8	October 22	Boston	4 – 2	Calgary		5–3–0	10	L
9	October 25	Calgary	4 – 0	Edmonton		6–3–0	12	W
10	October 28	Calgary	7 – 5	Winnipeg		7–3–0	14	W
11	October 30	Washington	3 – 1	Calgary		7–4–0	14	L
12	October 31	Minnesota	3 – 5	Calgary		8–4–0	16	W

November: 6–5–2 (home: 4–3–0; road: 2–2–2)

Game	Date	Visitor	Score	Home	OT	Record	Pts	Recap
13	November 2	Vancouver	3 – 5	Calgary		9–4–0	18	W
14	November 4	Calgary	5 – 5	Vancouver	OT	9–4–1	19	T
15	November 5	Ottawa	4 – 8	Calgary		10–4–1	21	W
16	November 8	Calgary	5 – 5	Quebec	OT	10–4–2	22	T
17	November 9	Calgary	2 – 5	Montreal		10–5–2	22	L
18	November 11	Calgary	4 – 3	Hartford		11–5–2	24	W
19	November 12	Calgary	3 – 5	Boston		11–6–2	24	L
20	November 14	Calgary	5 – 3	Tampa Bay		12–6–2	26	W
21	November 19	Vancouver	3 – 4	Calgary		13–6–2	28	W
22	November 21	NY Islanders	4 – 3	Calgary		13–7–2	28	L
23	November 25	San Jose	4 – 3	Calgary	OT	13–8–2	28	L
24	November 27	Tampa Bay	2 – 3	Calgary	OT	14–8–2	30	W
25	November 28	Chicago	5 – 2	Calgary		14–9–2	30	L

December: 10–1–2 (home: 5–0–1; road: 5–1–1)

Game	Date	Visitor	Score	Home	OT	Record	Pts	Recap
26	December 2	Winnipeg	3 – 3	Calgary	OT	14–9–3	31	T
27	December 4	St. Louis	3 – 5	Calgary		15–9–3	33	W
28	December 7	Edmonton	3 – 6	Calgary		16–9–3	35	W
29	December 8	Calgary	1 – 3	Edmonton		16–10–3	35	L
30	December 11	Calgary	6 – 3	Toronto		17–10–3	37	W
31	December 12	Calgary	1 – 1	Ottawa	OT	17–10–4	38	T
32	December 14	Calgary	3 – 0	Detroit		18–10–4	40	W
33	December 15	Calgary	3 – 0	NY Rangers		19–10–4	42	W
34	December 19	Los Angeles	3 – 5	Calgary		20–10–4	44	W
35	December 21	Edmonton	2 – 3	Calgary	OT	21–10–4	46	W
36	December 23	Calgary	4 – 3	Winnipeg		22–10–4	48	W
37	December 27	Calgary	7 – 3	Edmonton		23–10–4	50	W
38	December 31	Montreal	3 – 5	Calgary		24–10–4	52	W

January: 3–9–2 (home: 1–4–1; road: 2–5–1)

Game	Date	Visitor	Score	Home	OT	Record	Pts	Recap
39	January 2	Philadelphia	3 – 7	Calgary		25–10–4	54	W
40	January 5	Winnipeg	4 – 2	Calgary		25–11–4	54	L
41	January 7	Calgary	2 – 3	St. Louis	OT	25–12–4	54	L
42	January 9	Calgary	2 – 3	Pittsburgh		25–13–4	54	L
43	January 10	Calgary	3 – 5	Buffalo		25–14–4	54	L
44	January 12	Calgary	2 – 8	NY Islanders		25–15–4	54	L
45	January 14	Calgary	4 – 4	Philadelphia	OT	25–15–5	55	T
46	January 16	Calgary	2 – 4	Minnesota		25–16–5	55	L
47	January 19	Los Angeles	3 – 2	Calgary	OT	25–17–5	55	L
48	January 22	Winnipeg	4 – 4	Calgary	OT	25–17–6	56	T
49	January 23	Pittsburgh	4 – 3	Calgary		25–18–6	56	L
50	January 26	Detroit	9 – 1	Calgary		25–19–6	56	L
51	January 28	Calgary	2 – 1	Los Angeles		26–19–6	58	W
52	January 30	Calgary	5 – 4	San Jose		27–19–6	60	W

February: 6–2–4 (home: 3–0–3; road: 3–2–1)

Game	Date	Visitor	Score	Home	OT	Record	Pts	Recap
53	February 2	Calgary	6 – 4	Washington		28–19–6	62	W
54	February 3	Calgary	5 – 4	New Jersey		29–19–6	64	W
55	February 10	San Jose	1 – 13	Calgary		30–19–6	66	W
56	February 12	Quebec	4 – 4	Calgary	OT	30–19–7	67	T
57	February 13	Hartford	3 – 4	Calgary		31–19–7	69	W
58	February 16 (at Cincinnati, OH)	Philadelphia	4 – 4	Calgary	OT	31–19–8	70	T
59	February 17	Calgary	2 – 4	Toronto		31–20–8	70	L
60	February 19	Calgary	3 – 3	Detroit	OT	31–20–9	71	T
61	February 21	Calgary	3 – 4	Chicago		31–21–9	71	L
62	February 23	Calgary	6 – 3	San Jose		32–21–9	73	W
63	February 26	NY Rangers	4 – 4	Calgary	OT	32–21–10	74	T
64	February 27	San Jose	4 – 5	Calgary		33–21–10	76	W

March: 4–8–0 (home: 3–4–0; road: 1–4–0)

Game	Date	Visitor	Score	Home	OT	Record	Pts	Recap
65	March 2	Calgary	2 – 6	Los Angeles		33–22–10	76	L
66	March 4	Calgary	1 – 2	St. Louis		33–23–10	76	L
67	March 6	Calgary	4 – 7	Tampa Bay		33–24–10	76	L
68	March 11	Detroit	3 – 6	Calgary		34–24–10	78	W
69	March 13	New Jersey	3 – 4	Calgary		35–24–10	80	W
70	March 14	Vancouver	2 – 3	Calgary		36–24–10	82	W
71	March 16	Chicago	1 – 0	Calgary		36–25–10	82	L
72	March 21	Calgary	2 – 4	Winnipeg		36–26–10	82	L
73	March 24	St. Louis	4 – 2	Calgary		36–27–10	82	L
74	March 26	Calgary	3 – 1	Vancouver		37–27–10	84	W
75	March 28	Toronto	4 – 0	Calgary		37–28–10	84	L
76	March 30	Winnipeg	5 – 4	Calgary		37–29–10	84	L

April: 6–1–1 (home: 3–0–0; road: 3–1–1)

Game	Date	Visitor	Score	Home	OT	Record	Pts	Recap
77	April 1	Minnesota	3 – 5	Calgary		38–29–10	86	W
78	April 3	Calgary	3 – 2	San Jose	OT	39–29–10	88	W
79	April 4	Calgary	4 – 3	San Jose		40–29–10	90	W
80	April 6	Calgary	3 – 3	Los Angeles	OT	40–29–11	91	T
81	April 9	Vancouver	1 – 8	Calgary		41–29–11	93	W
82	April 11	Calgary	3 – 6	Vancouver		41–30–11	93	L
83	April 13	Calgary	4 – 2	Edmonton		42–30–11	95	W
84	April 15	San Jose	3 – 7	Calgary		43–30–11	97	W

**Legend**: W Win (2 points) L Loss (0 points) T Tie (1 point)

=== Playoffs ===
1993 Stanley Cup playoffs
Smythe Division Semifinals vs. Los Angeles Kings (7) – Los Angeles wins 4–2

Game	Date	Visitor	Score	Home	OT	Attendance	Series	Recap
1	April 18	Los Angeles	6 – 3	Calgary		18,605	Los Angeles leads 1–0	L
2	April 21	Los Angeles	4 – 9	Calgary		19,169	Series tied 1–1	W
3	April 23	Calgary	5 – 2	Los Angeles		16,005	Calgary leads 2–1	W
4	April 25	Calgary	1 – 3	Los Angeles		16,005	Series tied 2–2	L
5	April 27	Los Angeles	9 – 4	Calgary		19,304	Los Angeles leads 3–2	L
6	April 29	Calgary	6 – 9	Los Angeles		16,005	Los Angeles wins 4–2	L

**Legend**: W Win L Loss

== Player statistics ==
=== Skaters ===
Note: GP = Games played; G = Goals; A = Assists; Pts = Points; PIM = Penalty minutes

		Regular season					Playoffs
Player	#	GP	G	A	Pts	PIM	GP	G	A	Pts	PIM
Theoren Fleury	14	83	34	66	100	88	6	5	7	12	27
Robert Reichel	26	80	40	48	88	54	6	2	4	6	2
Gary Suter	20	81	23	58	81	112	6	2	3	5	8
Gary Roberts	10	58	38	41	79	172	5	1	6	7	43
Joe Nieuwendyk	25	79	38	37	75	52	6	3	6	9	10
Sergei Makarov	42	71	18	39	57	40	-	-	-	-	-
Al MacInnis	2	50	11	43	54	61	6	1	6	7	10
Joel Otto	29	75	19	33	52	150	6	4	2	6	4
Paul Ranheim	28	83	21	22	43	26	6	0	1	1	0
Ron Stern	22	70	10	15	25	207	6	0	0	0	43
Chris Lindberg	32/11	62	9	12	21	18	2	0	1	1	2
Roger Johansson	34	77	4	16	20	62	5	0	1	1	2
Brent Ashton^{↑}	15	32	8	11	19	41	6	0	3	3	2
Trent Yawney	18	63	1	16	17	67	6	3	2	5	6
Frank Musil	3	80	6	10	16	131	6	1	1	2	7
Gary Leeman	11	30	9	5	14	10	-	-	-	-	-
Craig Berube	16	77	4	8	12	209	6	0	0	0	21
Michel Petit	7	35	3	9	12	54	-	-	-	-	-
Carey Wilson	33	22	4	7	11	8	-	-	-	-	-
Kevin Dahl	4	61	2	9	11	56	6	0	2	2	8
Chris Dahlquist	5	74	3	7	10	66	6	3	1	4	4
Greg Paslawski^{†}	23	13	4	5	9	0	6	3	0	3	0
Alexander Godynyuk	21	27	3	4	7	19	-	-	-	-	-
Brian Skrudland^{†}	39	16	2	4	6	10	6	0	3	3	12
C.J. Young	23	28	3	2	5	20	-	-	-	-	-
Todd Harkins	19	15	2	3	5	22	-	-	-	-	-
Paul Kruse	12	27	2	3	5	41	-	-	-	-	-
Jeff Reese	35	26	0	4	4	4	4	0	0	0	0
Greg Smyth	6	35	1	2	3	95	-	-	-	-	-
Tomas Forslund	27	6	0	2	2	0	-	-	-	-	-
Mike Vernon	30	64	0	2	2	42	4	0	0	0	2
Patrick Lebeau	38	1	0	0	0	0	-	-	-	-	-
Shawn Heaphy	13	1	0	0	0	0	-	-	-	-	-
Andrei Trefilov	1	1	0	0	0	2	-	-	-	-	-

^{†}Denotes player spent time with another team before joining Calgary. Stats reflect time with the Flames only.

=== Goaltenders ===
Note: GP = Games played; TOI = Time on ice (minutes); W = Wins; L = Losses; OT = Overtime/shootout losses; GA = Goals against; SO = Shutouts; GAA = Goals against average

		Regular season								Playoffs
Player	#	GP	TOI	W	L	T	GA	SO	GAA	GP	TOI	W	L	GA	SO	GAA
Jeff Reese	35	26	1311	14	4	1	70	1	3.20	4	209	1	3	17	1	4.88
Mike Vernon	30	64	3732	29	26	9	203	2	3.26	4	150	1	1	14	0	6.00
Andrei Trefilov	1	1	65	0	0	1	5	0	4.62	-	-	-	-	-	-	-

^{†}Denotes player spent time with another team before joining Calgary. Stats reflect time with the Flames only.

== Transactions ==
The Flames were involved in the following transactions during the 1992–93 season.

=== Trades ===
Date	Details	
June 22, 1992	To Ottawa Senators Mark Osiecki	To Calgary Flames Chris Lindberg
October 5, 1992	To Montreal Canadiens Future considerations	To Calgary Flames Patrick Lebeau
October 27, 1992	To Quebec Nordiques Bryan Deasley	To Calgary Flames Future considerations
December 16, 1992	To Washington Capitals Future considerations	To Calgary Flames Ken Sabourin
January 28, 1993	To Montreal Canadiens Gary Leeman	To Calgary Flames Brian Skrudland
February 1, 1993	To Boston Bruins C.J. Young	To Calgary Flames Brent Ashton
March 18, 1993	To Philadelphia Flyers 1993 9th-round pick (#226 overall)	To Calgary Flames Greg Paslawski

=== Free agents ===
Date	Player	Team
September 10, 1992	Jim Kyte	to Ottawa Senators

=== Signings ===
Date	Player	Contract term
November 29, 1992	Gary Suter	2-year

=== Waivers ===
Date	Player	Team
October 4, 1992	Chris Dahlquist	from Minnesota North Stars in waiver draft

== Draft picks ==
Calgary's picks at the 1992 NHL entry draft, held in Montreal, Quebec.

Rnd	Pick	Player	Nationality	Position	Team (league)	NHL statistics				
Rnd	Pick	Player	Nationality	Position	Team (league)	GP	G	A	Pts	PIM
1	6	Cory Stillman	Canada	C	Windsor Spitfires (OHL)	1025	278	449	727	489
2	30	Chris O'Sullivan	United States	D	N/A	62	2	17	19	16
3	54	Mathias Johansson	Sweden	LW	Färjestads BK (SEL)	58	5	10	15	15
4	78	Robert Svehla	Czechoslovakia	D	N/A	655	68	267	335	649
5	102	Sami Helenius	Finland	D	N/A	155	2	4	6	260
6	126	Ravil Yakubov	Russia	D	HC Dynamo Moscow (RSL					
6	129	Joel Bouchard	Canada	D	Verdun Collège Français (QMJHL)	364	22	53	75	264
7	150	Pavel Rajnoha	Czechoslovakia	D	N/A					
8	174	Ryan Mulhern	United States	RW	N/A	3	0	0	0	0
9	198	Brandon Carper	United States	D	Bowling Green (NCAA)					
10	222	Jonas Hoglund	Sweden	LW	Färjestads BK (SEL)	545	117	145	262	112
11	246	Andrei Potaichuk	Russia	RW	Krylja Sovetov (RSL)					
S	6	Jamie O'Brien	United States	D	N/A					

== See also ==
- 1992–93 NHL season
