= Vladimir Potapov =

Ukrainian mathematician

Vladimir Petrovich Potapov (24 January 1914 – 21 December 1980) was a Soviet mathematician. He was born in Odesa and died in Kharkiv.
