= 1992–93 Edmonton Oilers season =

NHL team season

1992–93 Edmonton Oilers
- Division: 5th Smythe
- Conference: 10th Campbell
- 1992–93 record: 26–50–8
- Home record: 16–21–5
- Road record: 10–29–3
- Goals for: 242
- Goals against: 337

Team information
- General manager: Glen Sather
- Coach: Ted Green
- Captain: Craig MacTavish
- Alternate captains: Shayne Corson; Dave Manson; Craig Simpson; Esa Tikkanen (Oct.–Mar.)
- Arena: Northlands Coliseum
- Average attendance: 14,855 (84.9%)
- Minor league affiliates: Cape Breton Oilers (AHL); Wheeling Thunderbirds (ECHL)

Team leaders
- Goals: Petr Klima (32)
- Assists: Bernie Nicholls (32)
- Points: Petr Klima (48)
- Penalty minutes: Dave Manson (210)
- Plus/minus: Martin Gelinas (+3)
- Wins: Bill Ranford (17)
- Goals against average: Bill Ranford (3.84)

The 1992–93 Edmonton Oilers season was the Oilers' 14th season in the National Hockey League (NHL). They were coming off an appearance in the Campbell Conference finals in 1991–92, losing to the Chicago Blackhawks in a four-game sweep. It was the team's third straight appearance in the conference finals, and eighth in ten years.

Prior to the season, the Oilers would trade away their leading scorer from the previous season, Vincent Damphousse, along with their fourth-round draft pick in 1993, to the Montreal Canadiens in exchange for Shayne Corson, Brent Gilchrist and Vladimir Vujtek. The loss of Damphousse hurt the Oilers offensively, as in 1992–93, they would score a franchise-low 242 goals.

The Oilers would struggle all season long. By the trade deadline, it was all but certain that they would fail to qualify for the playoffs for the first time since joining the NHL in 1979, and for the first time since the 1974–75 season the third time overall in franchise history. Edmonton would trade Esa Tikkanen to the New York Rangers for Doug Weight, Bernie Nicholls to the New Jersey Devils for Zdeno Ciger and Kevin Todd, and Craig Muni to the Chicago Blackhawks for Mike Hudson. The team was mathematically eliminated from playoff contention for the first time in franchise history on March 26 with a 4-1 loss at the hands of the Los Angeles Kings. They would finish the season with a franchise low 26 wins and 60 points, along with a franchise-high 50 losses, and missed the playoffs by 27 points.

The Oilers finished last in power-play goals, tied with the Ottawa Senators and San Jose Sharks, with 66.

Offensively, Petr Klima would lead the Oilers with 32 goals and 48 points, while Shayne Corson chipped in with 16 goals and 47 points. Bernie Nicholls would record 40 points in 46 games before being traded. On the blueline, Dave Manson would anchor the defense, scoring 15 goals and 45 points, while posting a team high 210 penalty minutes.

In goal, Bill Ranford would appear in 67 games, winning 17 of them, while posting a 3.84 GAA and a shutout. Ron Tugnutt would back him up, winning 9 games with a 4.12 GAA.

== Season standings ==
Smythe Division
	GP	W	L	T	Pts	GF	GA
**Vancouver Canucks**	84	46	29	9	**101**	346	278
**Calgary Flames**	84	43	30	11	**97**	322	282
**Los Angeles Kings**	84	39	35	10	**88**	338	340
**Winnipeg Jets**	84	40	37	7	**87**	322	320
Edmonton Oilers	84	26	50	8	60	242	337
San Jose Sharks	84	11	71	2	24	218	414

Note: GP = Games played, W = Wins, L = Losses, T = Ties, Pts = Points, GF = Goals for, GA = Goals against
Note: Teams that qualified for the playoffs are highlighted in bold.

== Schedule and results ==
1992–93 regular season
October: 3–8–1 (home: 2–3–1; road: 1–5–0)

Game	Date	Visitor	Score	Home	OT	Decision	Attendance	Record	Pts	Recap
1	October 6	Vancouver Canucks	5 – 4	Edmonton Oilers		Ranford	14,094	0–1–0	0	L
2	October 8	Edmonton Oilers	2 – 7	Calgary Flames		Ranford	18,995	0–2–0	0	L
3	October 10	Edmonton Oilers	2 – 5	Vancouver Canucks		Ranford	14,879	0–3–0	0	L
4	October 11	Toronto Maple Leafs	3 – 3	Edmonton Oilers	OT	Tugnutt	14,504	0–3–1	1	T
5	October 14	Edmonton Oilers	3 – 7	Winnipeg Jets		Ranford	12,340	0–4–1	1	L
6	October 15	Edmonton Oilers	4 – 3	Chicago Blackhawks	OT	Ranford	17,331	1–4–1	3	W
7	October 17	Edmonton Oilers	2 – 4	Detroit Red Wings		Ranford	19,635	1–5–1	3	L
8	October 20	Edmonton Oilers	1 – 6	Tampa Bay Lightning		Ranford	9,114	1–6–1	3	L
9	October 23	Boston Bruins	6 – 3	Edmonton Oilers		Ranford	15,984	1–7–1	3	L
10	October 25	Calgary Flames	4 – 0	Edmonton Oilers		Ranford	15,046	1–8–1	3	L
11	October 28	Minnesota North Stars	2 – 5	Edmonton Oilers		Ranford	12,614	2–8–1	5	W
12	October 31	Washington Capitals	2 – 4	Edmonton Oilers		Ranford	13,462	3–8–1	7	W

November: 5–4–3 (home: 3–2–1; road: 2–2–2)

Game	Date	Visitor	Score	Home	OT	Decision	Attendance	Record	Pts	Recap
13	November 3	Ottawa Senators	2 – 5	Edmonton Oilers		Tugnutt	12,738	4–8–1	9	W
14	November 6	Edmonton Oilers	6 – 1	Winnipeg Jets		Ranford	14,825	5–8–1	11	W
15	November 7	Edmonton Oilers	2 – 2	Minnesota North Stars	OT	Ranford	12,955	5–8–2	12	T
16	November 10	Edmonton Oilers	4 – 4	St. Louis Blues	OT	Ranford	15,404	5–8–3	13	T
17	November 12	Edmonton Oilers	4 – 3	San Jose Sharks		Tugnutt	11,089	6–8–3	15	W
18	November 14	Edmonton Oilers	2 – 6	Los Angeles Kings		Tugnutt	16,035	6–9–3	15	L
19	November 18	Vancouver Canucks	2 – 4	Edmonton Oilers		Tugnutt	13,476	7–9–3	17	W
20	November 21	Edmonton Oilers	0 – 9	Vancouver Canucks		Ranford	15,960	7–10–3	17	L
21	November 22	New York Islanders	5 – 5	Edmonton Oilers	OT	Ranford	13,484	7–10–4	18	T
22	November 25	Los Angeles Kings	3 – 1	Edmonton Oilers		Ranford	13,636	7–11–4	18	L
23	November 27	Chicago Blackhawks	8 – 1	Edmonton Oilers		Ranford	14,545	7–12–4	18	L
24	November 28	Tampa Bay Lightning	3 – 4	Edmonton Oilers	OT	Tugnutt	14,210	8–12–4	20	W

December: 5–9–1 (home: 3–3–1; road: 2–6–0)

Game	Date	Visitor	Score	Home	OT	Decision	Attendance	Record	Pts	Recap
25	December 1	Edmonton Oilers	3 – 1	San Jose Sharks		Tugnutt	11,039	9–12–4	22	W
26	December 3	Edmonton Oilers	1 – 4	Vancouver Canucks		Tugnutt	15,589	9–13–4	22	L
27	December 5	St. Louis Blues	5 – 1	Edmonton Oilers		Ranford	13,894	9–14–4	22	L
28	December 7	Edmonton Oilers	3 – 6	Calgary Flames		Ranford	19,922	9–15–4	22	L
29	December 8	Calgary Flames	1 – 3	Edmonton Oilers		Ranford	13,681	10–15–4	24	W
30	December 10	Edmonton Oilers	3 – 2	Minnesota North Stars		Ranford	13,076	11–15–4	26	W
31	December 12	Edmonton Oilers	1 – 3	Tampa Bay Lightning		Ranford	10,425	11–16–4	26	L
32	December 13	Edmonton Oilers	1 – 4	New York Islanders		Tugnutt	11,110	11–17–4	26	L
33	December 16	Vancouver Canucks	2 – 4	Edmonton Oilers		Ranford	14,011	12–17–4	28	W
34	December 18	Los Angeles Kings	5 – 5	Edmonton Oilers	OT	Ranford	15,257	12–17–5	29	T
35	December 21	Edmonton Oilers	2 – 3	Calgary Flames	OT	Ranford	20,214	12–18–5	29	L
36	December 23	San Jose Sharks	2 – 4	Edmonton Oilers		Ranford	14,457	13–18–5	31	W
37	December 27	Calgary Flames	7 – 3	Edmonton Oilers		Ranford	17,503	13–19–5	31	L
38	December 29	Montreal Canadiens	6 – 3	Edmonton Oilers		Ranford	17,503	13–20–5	31	L
39	December 31	Edmonton Oilers	2 – 3	Winnipeg Jets		Ranford	15,554	13–21–5	31	L

January: 5–6–3 (home: 4–2–2; road: 1–4–1)

Game	Date	Visitor	Score	Home	OT	Decision	Attendance	Record	Pts	Recap
40	January 2	Tampa Bay Lightning	1 – 2	Edmonton Oilers		Ranford	14,361	14–21–5	33	W
41	January 3	Philadelphia Flyers	2 – 2	Edmonton Oilers	OT	Ranford	15,210	14–21–6	34	T
42	January 5	Edmonton Oilers	1 – 6	St. Louis Blues		Ranford	16,863	14–22–6	34	L
43	January 7	Edmonton Oilers	3 – 3	Chicago Blackhawks	OT	Ranford	17,558	14–22–7	35	T
44	January 9	Edmonton Oilers	3 – 4	Washington Capitals		Ranford	15,691	14–23–7	35	L
45	January 10	Edmonton Oilers	0 – 4	Philadelphia Flyers		Tugnutt	17,218	14–24–7	35	L
46	January 13	Winnipeg Jets	4 – 1	Edmonton Oilers		Ranford	13,132	14–25–7	35	L
47	January 15	Hartford Whalers	1 – 3	Edmonton Oilers		Ranford	12,675	15–25–7	37	W
48	January 17	Buffalo Sabres	2 – 3	Edmonton Oilers	OT	Tugnutt	13,135	16–25–7	39	W
49	January 19	Los Angeles Kings	5 – 4	Edmonton Oilers		Ranford	16,686	16–26–7	39	L
50	January 22	Pittsburgh Penguins	1 – 2	Edmonton Oilers		Tugnutt	17,185	17–26–7	41	W
51	January 23	Edmonton Oilers	5 – 8	Winnipeg Jets		Ranford	15,052	17–27–7	41	L
52	January 27	Detroit Red Wings	2 – 2	Edmonton Oilers	OT	Tugnutt	14,713	17–27–8	42	T
53	January 31	Edmonton Oilers	5 – 4	Buffalo Sabres	OT	Tugnutt	14,455	18–27–8	44	W

February: 5–7–0 (home: 2–2–0; road: 3–5–0)

Game	Date	Visitor	Score	Home	OT	Decision	Attendance	Record	Pts	Recap
54	February 2	Edmonton Oilers	4 – 3	Boston Bruins		Tugnutt	14,101	19–27–8	46	W
55	February 3	Edmonton Oilers	2 – 3	Ottawa Senators		Tugnutt	10,425	19–28–8	46	L
56	February 9	Edmonton Oilers	6 – 3	Los Angeles Kings		Ranford	16,005	20–28–8	48	W
57	February 12	San Jose Sharks	0 – 6	Edmonton Oilers		Ranford	15,089	21–28–8	50	W
58	February 14	Quebec Nordiques	3 – 2	Edmonton Oilers	OT	Ranford	17,503	21–29–8	50	L
59	February 16	Edmonton Oilers	2 – 7	New York Islanders		Tugnutt	9,166	21–30–8	50	L
60	February 18	Edmonton Oilers	5 – 4	Pittsburgh Penguins		Ranford	16,075	22–30–8	52	W
61	February 20	Edmonton Oilers	3 – 7	Hartford Whalers		Ranford	11,676	22–31–8	52	L
62	February 21	Edmonton Oilers	3 – 4	Montreal Canadiens		Ranford	16,628	22–32–8	52	L
63	February 23	Edmonton Oilers	3 – 6	Quebec Nordiques		Ranford	14,012	22–33–8	52	L
64	February 27	New York Rangers	1 – 0	Edmonton Oilers		Ranford	17,503	22–34–8	54	L
65	February 28	San Jose Sharks	1 – 4	Edmonton Oilers		Ranford	13,214	23–34–8	56	W

March: 3–10–0 (home: 2–6–0; road: 1–4–0)

Game	Date	Visitor	Score	Home	OT	Decision	Attendance	Record	Pts	Recap
66	March 4	Winnipeg Jets	5 – 3	Edmonton Oilers		Ranford	15,180	23–35–8	56	L
67	March 6	Edmonton Oilers	1 – 6	Los Angeles Kings		Ranford	16,005	23–36–8	56	L
68	March 7	Edmonton Oilers	1 – 6	San Jose Sharks		Tugnutt	11,089	23–37–8	56	L
69	March 10	Detroit Red Wings	6 – 3	Edmonton Oilers		Ranford	14,093	23–38–8	56	L
70	March 12	New Jersey Devils	4 – 6	Edmonton Oilers		Ranford	14,410	24–38–8	58	W
71	March 14	Chicago Blackhawks	5 – 4	Edmonton Oilers		Ranford	15,123	24–39–8	58	L
72	March 17	Edmonton Oilers	4 – 3	New York Rangers	OT	Ranford	18,034	25–39–8	60	W
73	March 18	Edmonton Oilers	1 – 5	New Jersey Devils		Ranford	12,236	25–40–8	60	L
74	March 20	Edmonton Oilers	2 – 4	Toronto Maple Leafs		Ranford	15,720	25–41–8	60	L
75	March 21	Pittsburgh Penguins	6 – 4	Edmonton Oilers		Tugnutt	18,782	25–42–8	60	L
76	March 26	Los Angeles Kings	4 – 1	Edmonton Oilers		Ranford	17,501	25–43–8	60	L
77	March 27	Toronto Maple Leafs	6 – 2	Edmonton Oilers		Ranford	16,005	25–44–8	60	L
78	March 31	Minnesota North Stars	2 – 5	Edmonton Oilers		Ranford	12,924	26–44–8	60	W

April: 0–6–0 (home: 0–3–0; road: 0–3–0)

Game	Date	Visitor	Score	Home	OT	Decision	Attendance	Record	Pts	Recap
79	April 3	Winnipeg Jets	6 – 4	Edmonton Oilers		Ranford	15,139	26–45–8	60	L
80	April 6	Edmonton Oilers	2 – 5	San Jose Sharks		Ranford	10,855	26–46–8	60	L
81	April 7	Edmonton Oilers	4 – 5	Vancouver Canucks	OT	Tugnutt	15,858	26–47–8	60	L
82	April 11	Winnipeg Jets	7 – 5	Edmonton Oilers		Tugnutt	14,852	26–48–8	60	L
83	April 13	Calgary Flames	4 – 2	Edmonton Oilers		Tugnutt	15,433	26–49–8	60	L
84	April 15	Edmonton Oilers	0 – 3	Winnipeg Jets		Ranford	12,229	26–50–8	60	L

**Legend**: W Win (2 points) L Loss (0 points) T Tie (1 point)

== Player statistics ==
=== Scoring ===
- Position abbreviations: C = Centre; D = Defence; G = Goaltender; LW = Left wing; RW = Right wing
- † = Joined team via a transaction (e.g., trade, waivers, signing) during the season. Stats reflect time with the Oilers only.
- ‡ = Left team via a transaction (e.g., trade, waivers, release) during the season. Stats reflect time with the Oilers only.

No.	Player	Pos	Regular season					
No.	Player	Pos	GP	G	A	Pts	+/-	PIM
85	Petr Klima	RW	68	32	16	48	−15	100
9 (Note: Corson wore number 21 through January 17.)	Shayne Corson	LW	80	16	31	47	−19	209
18	Craig Simpson	LW	60	24	22	46	−14	36
24	Dave Manson	D	83	15	30	45	−28	210
9	Bernie Nicholls‡	C	46	8	32	40	−16	40
10	Esa Tikkanen‡	LW	66	14	19	33	−11	76
27	Scott Mellanby	RW	69	15	17	32	−4	147
16	Kelly Buchberger	RW	83	12	18	30	−27	133
14	Craig MacTavish	C	82	10	20	30	−16	110
8	Zdeno Ciger†	RW	37	9	15	24	−5	6
7	Martin Gelinas	LW	65	11	12	23	3	30
41	Brent Gilchrist‡	C	60	10	10	20	−10	47
26	Shjon Podein	C	40	13	6	19	−2	25
34	Greg Hawgood‡	D	29	5	13	18	−1	35
25	Geoff Smith	D	78	4	14	18	−11	30
6	Brian Glynn	D	64	4	12	16	−13	60
15	Kevin Todd†	C	25	4	9	13	−5	10
22	Luke Richardson	D	82	3	10	13	−18	142
21	Igor Kravchuk†	D	17	4	8	12	−8	2
2	Chris Joseph	D	33	2	10	12	−9	48
23	Vladimir Vujtek	LW	30	1	10	11	−1	8
28	Craig Muni‡	D	72	0	11	11	−15	67
29	Louie DeBrusk	LW	51	8	2	10	−16	205
34	Todd Elik†	C	14	1	9	10	1	8
36	Brad Werenka	D	27	5	4	9	1	24
42	Josef Beranek‡	RW	26	2	6	8	−7	28
42	Doug Weight†	C	13	2	6	8	−2	10
19	Brian Benning†	D	18	1	7	8	−1	59
12	Steven Rice	RW	28	2	5	7	−4	28
20	Shaun Van Allen	C	21	1	4	5	−2	6
41	Bill McDougall	C	4	2	1	3	2	4
30	Bill Ranford	G	67	0	3	3		10
12	David Maley‡	LW	13	1	1	2	−3	29
19	Tyler Wright	C	7	1	1	2	−4	19
20	Mike Hudson†	C	5	0	1	1	−1	2
17	Scott Thornton	C	9	0	1	1	−4	0
26	Dan Currie	LW	5	0	0	0	−4	4
35	Francois Leroux	D	1	0	0	0	0	4
1	Ron Tugnutt	G	26	0	0	0		2

=== Goaltending ===
No.	Player	Regular season									
No.	Player	GP	W	L	T	SA	GA	GAA	SV%	SO	TOI
30	Bill Ranford	67	17	38	6	2065	240	3.84	.884	1	3753
1	Ron Tugnutt	26	9	12	2	767	93	4.17	.879	0	1338

== Awards and records ==
=== Milestones ===
**Regular Season**
**Player**	**Milestone**	**Reached**
Dave Manson	1,400th NHL PIM	October 8, 1992
Tyler Wright	1st NHL Game; 1st NHL Goal; 1st NHL Point	October 10, 1992
Shayne Corson	900th NHL PIM	October 14, 1992
Tyler Wright	1st NHL Assist	October 17, 1992
Scott Mellanby	900th NHL PIM	October 23, 1992
Martin Gelinas	200th NHL Game	October 28, 1992
David Maley	800th NHL PIM	October 28, 1992
Vladimir Vujtek	1st NHL Goal; 1st NHL Point	October 28, 1992
Vladimir Vujtek	1st NHL Assist	October 31, 1992
Greg Hawgood	100th NHL Point	November 3, 1992
Martin Gelinas	100th NHL Point	November 6, 1992
Esa Tikkanen	700th NHL PIM	November 10, 1992
Kelly Buchberger	300th NHL Game	November 12, 1992
Greg Hawgood	200th NHL PIM	November 21, 1992
Luke Richardson	700th NHL PIM	November 21, 1992
Petr Klima	500th NHL Game	November 27, 1992
Craig Simpson	500th NHL PIM	November 27, 1992
Shayne Corson	300th NHL Point	November 28, 1992
Shaun Van Allen	1st NHL Assist; 1st NHL Point	December 1, 1992
Craig MacTavish	600th NHL PIM	December 3, 1992
Craig MacTavish	800th NHL Game	December 10, 1992
Shaun Van Allen	1st NHL Goal	December 10, 1992
Petr Klima	400th NHL PIM	December 12, 1992
Shayne Corson	1,000th NHL PIM	December 16, 1992
Louie DeBrusk	200th NHL PIM	December 18, 1992
Petr Klima	400th NHL Point	December 18, 1992
Dave Manson	200th NHL Point	December 31, 1992
Dave Manson	1,500th NHL PIM	January 7, 1993
Brad Werenka	1st NHL Game	January 7, 1993
Shjon Podein	1st NHL Game; 1st NHL Goal; 1st NHL Point	January 9, 1993
Bill Ranford	300th NHL Game	January 9, 1993
Brad Werenka	1st NHL Assist; 1st NHL Point	January 9, 1993
Bernie Nicholls	800th NHL Game	January 10, 1993
Brad Werenka	1st NHL Goal	January 13, 1993
Scott Mellanby	1,000th NHL PIM	January 15, 1993
Craig MacTavish	400th NHL Point	January 17, 1993
Luke Richardson	400th NHL Game	January 17, 1993
Esa Tikkanen	500th NHL Game	January 17, 1993
Shjon Podein	1st NHL Assist	January 22, 1993
Kelly Buchberger	1st NHL Hat-trick	January 31, 1993
Zdeno Ciger	100th NHL Game	February 2, 1993
Craig Muni	500th NHL Game	February 20, 1993
Bill McDougall	1st NHL Goal	March 18, 1993
Brian Benning	200th NHL Assist	March 20, 1993
Luke Richardson	800th NHL PIM	March 21, 1993
Kelly Buchberger	100th NHL Point	March 31, 1993
Louie DeBrusk	300th NHL PIM	April 3, 1993
Scott Mellanby	500th NHL Game	April 6, 1993
Brian Benning	800th NHL PIM	April 7, 1993
Dave Manson	1,600th NHL PIM	April 11, 1993
Shayne Corson	1,100th NHL PIM	April 13, 1993
Shayne Corson	500th NHL Game	April 15, 1993

== Transactions ==
=== Trades ===
Date	Details	
June 20, 1992	To New York Rangers 4th-round pick in 1992	To Edmonton Oilers 4th-round pick in 1992; 8th-round pick in 1992
August 4, 1992	To Minnesota North Stars Collin Bauer	To Edmonton Oilers Future considerations
August 27, 1992	To Montreal Canadiens Vincent Damphousse; 4th round pick in 1993	To Edmonton Oilers Shayne Corson; Brent Gilchrist; Vladimir Vujtek
September 25, 1992	To Tampa Bay Lightning Future considerations	To Edmonton Oilers Jeff Bloemberg
October 22, 1992	To Chicago Blackhawks Joe Crowley	To Edmonton Oilers Justin Lafayette
December 11, 1992	To New York Rangers Kevin Lowe	To Edmonton Oilers Roman Oksiuta; 3rd-round pick in 1993
January 13, 1993	To New Jersey Devils Bernie Nicholls	To Edmonton Oilers Kevin Todd; Zdeno Ciger
January 16, 1993	To Philadelphia Flyers Greg Hawgood; Josef Beranek	To Edmonton Oilers Brian Benning
February 24, 1993	To Chicago Blackhawks Joe Murphy	To Edmonton Oilers Igor Kravchuk; Dean McAmmond
March 5, 1993	To Minnesota North Stars Brent Gilchrist	To Edmonton Oilers Todd Elik
March 17, 1993	To New York Rangers Esa Tikkanen	To Edmonton Oilers Doug Weight
March 22, 1993	To Chicago Blackhawks Craig Muni	To Edmonton Oilers Mike Hudson

=== Free agents ===
**Player**	**Former team**
D Ian Herbers	Buffalo Sabres
D Brian Curran	Buffalo Sabres

**Player**	**New team**
G Mike Greenlay	Tampa Bay Lightning
F Stan Drulia	Tampa Bay Lightning

=== Waivers ===
Date	Player	Team
October 4, 1992	Norm Maciver	to Ottawa Senators
January 1, 1993	David Maley	to San Jose Sharks

== Draft picks ==
Edmonton's draft picks at the 1992 NHL entry draft.

Round	#	Player	Nationality	College/Junior/Club team (League)
1	13	Joe Hulbig	United States	Saint Sebastian's School (USHS-MA)
2	37	Martin Reichel	Germany	EHC Freiburg (Germany)
3	61	Simon Roy	Canada	Shawinigan Cataractes (QMJHL)
3	65	Kirk Maltby	Canada	Owen Sound Platers (OHL)
4	96	Ralph Intranuovo	Canada	Sault Ste. Marie Greyhounds (OHL)
5	109	Joaquin Gage	Canada	Portland Winter Hawks (WHL)
7	157	Steve Gibson	Canada	Windsor Spitfires (OHL)
8	181	Kyuin Shim	Canada	Sherwood Park Crusaders (AJHL)
8	190	Colin Schmidt	Canada	Regina Midgets (Sask.)
9	205	Marko Tuomainen	Finland	Clarkson University (ECAC)
11	253	Brian Rasmussen	Canada	St. Louis Park High School (USHS-MN)
