= 1992–93 Toronto Maple Leafs season =

NHL hockey team season

1992–93 Toronto Maple Leafs
- Division: 3rd Norris
- Conference: 4th Campbell
- 1992–93 record: 44–29–11
- Home record: 25–11–6
- Road record: 19–18–5
- Goals for: 288
- Goals against: 241

Team information
- General manager: Cliff Fletcher
- Coach: Pat Burns
- Captain: Wendel Clark
- Alternate captains: Doug Gilmour; Bob Rouse
- Arena: Maple Leaf Gardens
- Average attendance: 15,676

Team leaders
- Goals: Nikolai Borschevsky (34)
- Assists: Doug Gilmour (95)
- Points: Doug Gilmour (127)
- Penalty minutes: Rob Pearson (211)
- Plus/minus: Nikolai Borschevsky (+33)
- Wins: Felix Potvin (25)
- Goals against average: Daren Puppa (2.25)

The 1992–93 Toronto Maple Leafs season was Toronto's 76th season in the National Hockey League (NHL). The team qualified for the playoffs after a two year absence.

== Off-season ==
Head coach Tom Watt was fired on May 4. Watt remained with the organization as director of player development.

On May 29, Montreal Canadiens head coach Pat Burns quit that role in order to sign a four-year contract to become Toronto's new head coach.

== Regular season ==
- Grant Fuhr was traded by the Maple Leafs (with conditional pick in 1995 draft) to Buffalo Sabres for LW Dave Andreychuk, G Daren Puppa and first-round draft pick in the 1993 draft (D Kenny Jonsson) on February 2, 1993.

The 1992–93 season was a triumph for the Maple Leafs. It saw them set franchise records in wins (44) and points (99). Twenty-one-year-old goaltender Felix Potvin played his first full season with the team and was solid with a 25–15–7 record, a 2.50 goals against average (GAA), two shutouts and a .910 save percentage. In a season that saw 20 of 24 teams average more than three goals scored per game, the Maple Leafs goaltending was one of the best in the NHL, allowing only 241 goals in 84 games (only the Chicago Blackhawks allowed fewer goals than Toronto). The Maple Leafs also had a strong defence corps, anchored by Dave Ellett, Todd Gill, Sylvain Lefebvre, Jamie Macoun, Dmitri Mironov and Bob Rouse. Out of all 24 teams, the Maple Leafs allowed the fewest power-play goals in the regular season (69). Newcomers Dave Andreychuk and Daren Puppa also played very well. In just 31 games with the Leafs, Andreychuk scored 25 goals and had 13 assists for 38 points. Puppa won six out of eight games, had a 2.25 GAA, two shutouts and a .922 save percentage. Rookie Nikolai Borschevsky led the team in goals with 34 and would score a very important goal in the first round of the playoffs against the Detroit Red Wings; Borschevsky deflected Bob Rouse's shot 2:35 into the first overtime period of game seven at Joe Louis Arena to give the Leafs a 4–3 win and a four-games-to-three series win.

=== Doug Gilmour ===
Doug Gilmour had a career year in 1992–93. He had a franchise-record 127 points during the 1992–93 regular season and ranked eighth in NHL scoring. In the playoffs, he played a key role as the Leafs took out the powerhouse Detroit Red Wings and St. Louis Blues, both in seven games. Gilmour finished the playoffs with 35 points, behind only Wayne Gretzky. Gilmour was the runner-up for the Hart Memorial Trophy as regular season MVP and won the Frank J. Selke Trophy as best defensive forward, the first major NHL award that a Leaf player had won since 1967.

=== Off-ice issues ===
Off the ice, the often-bitter debate surrounding beer sales at Maple Leaf Gardens reached a climax. By 1992, beer had been sold for over a decade at major outdoor venues such as Exhibition Stadium and the SkyDome, but this policy did not extend to Maple Leaf Gardens, which by 1992 was one of only two major professional sports venues in North America (the other being the Delta Center in Salt Lake City) where all alcohol sales were banned.

After the expansion Ottawa Senators were able to secure a liquor licence for the Ottawa Civic Centre, Maple Leafs management lobbied heavily to be permitted the same, promising strict protocols would be enforced. Despite fierce opposition from some municipal politicians such as Councillor Kay Gardner, Toronto City Council ultimately voted in favour. Following provincial approval, the first beer was sold at Maple Leaf Gardens on January 30, 1993 (10½ years to the day after the first beer had been sold at Exhibition Stadium).

=== Season standings ===
Norris Division
	GP	W	L	T	Pts	GF	GA
**Chicago Blackhawks**	84	47	25	12	**106**	279	230
**Detroit Red Wings**	84	47	28	9	**103**	369	280
**Toronto Maple Leafs**	84	44	29	11	**99**	288	241
**St. Louis Blues**	84	37	36	11	**85**	282	278
Minnesota North Stars	84	36	38	10	82	272	293
Tampa Bay Lightning	84	23	54	7	53	245	332

Note: GP = Games played, W = Wins, L = Losses, T = Ties, Pts = Points, GF = Goals for, GA = Goals against
Note: Teams that qualified for the playoffs are highlighted in bold.

== Playoffs ==
=== Norris Division Semifinals: Detroit vs. Toronto ===
In a revival of the heated Original Six rivalry, Nikolai Borschevsky's game seven overtime goal gave Toronto the series. This was also Toronto's first playoff win over Detroit since the Leafs beat the Wings in the full seven games back in the 1964 Stanley Cup Final.

=== Norris Division Finals: Toronto vs. St. Louis ===
The Maple Leafs defeated the Blues in seven games to win the Norris Division playoffs, despite Blues' goaltender Curtis Joseph's efforts. The Blues were heavily outshot throughout the series including more than 60 shots in game one alone. Game seven was the first to be played at Maple Leaf Gardens since the 1964 Cup Final when Andy Bathgate scored the cup clinching goal.

=== Conference Finals: Toronto vs. Los Angeles ===
This intense seven-game series has been etched in the memory of hockey fans. The Toronto Maple Leafs brought a highly competitive team for the first time in years and were hoping to break their 26-year Stanley Cup drought; they had not even been to the Cup Final since their last Cup win in 1967. The Los Angeles Kings, led by captain Wayne Gretzky, also had high ambitions. During game one (a dominating victory for the Leafs) Los Angeles blue-liner Marty McSorley delivered a serious open ice hit on Toronto's Doug Gilmour. Leafs captain Wendel Clark took exception to the hit and went after McSorley for striking their star player. Toronto coach Pat Burns tried scaling the bench to get at Los Angeles coach Barry Melrose because he thought he ordered the hit on Gilmour (McSorley later remarked in interviews that he received dozens of death threat messages on his hotel phone from angry fans). Toronto would take a 3–2 series lead after five games. Game six went back west to the Great Western Forum in Los Angeles; it too was not without controversy and was also decided on an overtime goal. During the 1992–93 season, there was a league-wide crackdown on High-Sticking infractions, whether they were accidental or not. In game six, Gilmour was part of controversy once again. With the game tied at 4 in overtime, Wayne Gretzky clipped him in the face with the blade of his stick, drawing blood. Everyone thought that referee Kerry Fraser should have called a penalty on the play, but Gretzky was not penalized, and he went on to score the overtime goal moments later, evening the series at 3–3. He would score three goals in the deciding game to give Los Angeles a berth in the Stanley Cup Final for the first time in franchise history and also the first time the Kings won a playoff series against an Original Six team. Gretzky has been quoted as saying that his performance in game seven was the best NHL game of his career.

== Schedule and results ==
=== Regular season ===
1992–93 regular season
October: 6–4–2 (home: 5–2–1; road: 1–2–1)

Game	Date	Visitor	Score	Home	OT	Record	Points	Recap
1	October 6	Washington	6 – 5	Toronto		0–1–0	0	L
2	October 10	Toronto	2 – 3	Calgary		0–2–0	0	L
3	October 11	Toronto	3 – 3	Edmonton		0–2–1	1	T
4	October 15	Tampa Bay	3 – 5	Toronto		1–2–1	3	W
5	October 17	Chicago	3 – 4	Toronto		2–2–1	5	W
6	October 18	Minnesota	5 – 1	Toronto		2–3–1	5	L
7	October 20	Ottawa	3 – 5	Toronto^{[a]}		3–3–1	7	W
8	October 22	Toronto	5 – 2	Tampa Bay		4–3–1	9	W
9	October 24	San Jose	1 – 5	Toronto		5–3–1	11	W
10	October 28	Buffalo	4 – 4	Toronto		5–3–2	12	T
11	October 30	Toronto	1 – 7	Detroit		5–4–2	12	L
12	October 31	Detroit	1 – 3	Toronto		6–4–2	14	W

November: 5–5–1 (home: 2–2–1; road: 3–3–0)

Game	Date	Visitor	Score	Home	OT	Record	Points	Recap
13	November 5	Toronto	0 – 1	Chicago		6–5–2	14	L
14	November 7	Pittsburgh	2 – 4	Toronto		7–5–2	16	W
15	November 9	Toronto	3 – 1	Ottawa		8–5–2	18	W
16	November 14	Toronto	4 – 1	Boston		9–5–2	20	W
17	November 16	St. Louis	2 – 2	Toronto	OT	9–5–3	21	T
18	November 17	Toronto	1 – 3	Quebec^{[a]}		9–6–3	21	L
19	November 19	Toronto	2 – 0	San Jose		10–6–3	23	W
20	November 21	Toronto	4 – 6	Los Angeles		10–7–3	23	L
21	November 24	Tampa Bay	3 – 2	Toronto		10–8–3	23	L
22	November 26	Quebec	5 – 4	Toronto	OT	10–9–3	23	L
23	November 28	Los Angeles	2 – 3	Toronto		11–9–3	25	W

December: 4–7–3 (home: 2–2–1; road: 2–5–2)

Game	Date	Visitor	Score	Home	OT	Record	Points	Recap
24	December 1	Toronto	3 – 8	New Jersey		11–10–3	25	L
25	December 3	Toronto	3 – 4	Chicago		11–11–3	25	L
26	December 5	Chicago	2 – 2	Toronto	OT	11–11–4	26	T
27	December 6	Toronto	0 – 6	N.Y. Rangers		11–12–4	26	L
28	December 9	Detroit	3 – 5	Toronto		12–12–4	28	W
29	December 11	Calgary	6 – 3	Toronto		12–13–4	28	L
30	December 15	Toronto	5 – 6	Minnesota		12–14–4	28	L
31	December 19	Ottawa	1 – 5	Toronto		13–14–4	30	W
32	December 20	Toronto	4 – 5	Buffalo		13–15–4	30	L
33	December 22	Toronto	4 – 4	Detroit	OT	13–15–5	31	T
34	December 26	Detroit	5 – 1	Toronto		13–16–5	31	L
35	December 27	Toronto	6 – 3	St. Louis		14–16–5	33	W
36	December 29	Toronto	3 – 2	N.Y. Islanders		15–16–5	35	W
37	December 31	Toronto	3 – 3	Pittsburgh	OT	15–16–6	36	T

January: 9–4–1 (home: 5–3–1; road: 4–1–0)

Game	Date	Visitor	Score	Home	OT	Record	Points	Recap
38	January 2	St. Louis	2 – 2	Toronto	OT	15–16–7	37	T
39	January 4	Toronto	4 – 2	Detroit		16–16–7	39	W
40	January 6	Vancouver	5 – 2	Toronto		16–17–7	39	L
41	January 8	San Jose	1 – 5	Toronto		17–17–7	41	W
42	January 9	Toronto	5 – 4	Montreal		18–17–7	43	W
43	January 11	Tampa Bay	2 – 4	Toronto		19–17–7	45	W
44	January 13	St. Louis	3 – 4	Toronto		20–17–7	47	W
45	January 16	Chicago	5 – 3	Toronto		20–18–7	47	L
46	January 17	Toronto	3 – 5	Chicago		20–19–7	47	L
47	January 19	Toronto	5 – 1	St. Louis		21–19–7	49	W
48	January 21	Toronto	6 – 1	Tampa Bay		22–19–7	51	W
49	January 23	Montreal	0 – 4	Toronto		23–19–7	53	W
50	January 26	Minnesota	2 – 1	Toronto		23–20–7	53	L
51	January 30	N.Y. Rangers	1 – 3	Toronto		24–20–7	55	W

February: 8–2–2 (home: 4–1–1; road: 4–1–1)

Game	Date	Visitor	Score	Home	OT	Record	Points	Recap
52	February 1	Toronto	1 – 1	St. Louis	OT	24–20–8	56	T
53	February 3	N.Y. Islanders	3 – 2	Toronto		24–21–8	56	L
54	February 9	Toronto	1 – 3	Tampa Bay		24–22–8	56	L
55	February 11	Vancouver	2 – 5	Toronto		25–22–8	58	W
56	February 13	Minnesota	1 – 6	Toronto		26–22–8	60	W
57	February 14	Toronto	6 – 5	Minnesota		27–22–8	62	W
58	February 17	Calgary	2 – 4	Toronto		28–22–8	64	W
59	February 19	Tampa Bay	1 – 4	Toronto		29–22–8	66	W
60	February 20	Boston	4 – 4	Toronto	OT	29–22–9	67	T
61	February 22	Toronto	8 – 1	Vancouver		30–22–9	69	W
62	February 25	Toronto	5 – 0	San Jose		31–22–9	71	W
63	February 27	Toronto	5 – 2	Los Angeles		32–22–9	73	W

March: 9–3–2 (home: 5–0–1; road: 4–3–1)

Game	Date	Visitor	Score	Home	OT	Record	Points	Recap
64	March 3	Minnesota	1 – 3	Toronto		33–22–9	75	W
65	March 5	Toronto	1 – 5	Detroit		33–23–9	75	L
66	March 6	Winnipeg	2 – 4	Toronto		34–23–9	77	W
67	March 9	Toronto	1 – 3	Washington		34–24–9	77	L
68	March 10	Hartford	3 – 5	Toronto		35–24–9	79	W
69	March 12	Tampa Bay	2 – 8	Toronto		36–24–9	81	W
70	March 15	Toronto	2 – 4	Quebec		36–25–9	81	L
71	March 18	Toronto	4 – 2	Tampa Bay		37–25–9	83	W
72	March 20	Edmonton	2 – 4	Toronto		38–25–9	85	W
73	March 23	Toronto	5 – 4	Winnipeg		39–25–9	87	W
74	March 25	Toronto	3 – 3	Minnesota	OT	39–25–10	88	T
75	March 27	Toronto	6 – 2	Edmonton		40–25–10	90	W
76	March 28	Toronto	4 – 0	Calgary		41–25–10	92	W
77	March 31	Los Angeles	5 – 5	Toronto	OT	41–25–11	93	T

April: 3–4–0 (home: 2–1–0; road: 1–3–0)

Game	Date	Visitor	Score	Home	OT	Record	Points	Recap
78	April 3	New Jersey	0 – 1	Toronto		42–25–11	95	W
79	April 4	Toronto	0 – 4	Philadelphia		42–26–11	95	L
80	April 8	Toronto	3 – 5	Winnipeg		42–27–11	95	L
81	April 10	Philadelphia	4 – 0	Toronto		42–28–11	95	L
82	April 11	Toronto	4 – 2	Hartford		43–28–11	97	W
83	April 13	St. Louis	1 – 2	Toronto	OT	44–28–11	99	W
84	April 15	Toronto	2 – 3	Chicago		44–29–11	99	L

Legend: W Win (2 points) L Loss (0 points) T Tie (1 point)
Notes: ^{a} Neutral site game played at Copps Coliseum in Hamilton, Ontario.

=== Playoffs ===
1993 Stanley Cup playoffs
Norris Division Semifinals vs. (N2) Detroit Red Wings – Maple Leafs win 4–3

Game	Date	Score	Opponent	Series	Recap
1	April 19, 1993	3–6	@ Detroit Red Wings	Red Wings lead 1–0	L
2	April 21, 1993	2–6	@ Detroit Red Wings	Red Wings lead 2–0	L
3	April 23, 1993	4–2	Detroit Red Wings	Red Wings lead 2–1	W
4	April 25, 1993	3–2	Detroit Red Wings	Series tied 2–2	W
5	April 27, 1993	5–4 OT	@ Detroit Red Wings	Maple Leafs lead 3–2	W
6	April 29, 1993	3–7	Detroit Red Wings	Series tied 3–3	L
7	May 1, 1993	4–3 OT	@ Detroit Red Wings	Maple Leafs win 4–3	W

Norris Division Finals vs. (N4) St. Louis Blues: Maple Leafs win 4–3

Game	Date	Score	Opponent	Series	Recap
1	May 3, 1993	2–1 2OT	St. Louis Blues	Maple Leafs lead 1–0	W
2	May 5, 1993	1–2 2OT	St. Louis Blues	Series tied 1–1	L
3	May 7, 1993	3–4	@ St. Louis Blues	Blues lead 2–1	L
4	May 9, 1993	4–1	@ St. Louis Blues	Series tied 2–2	W
5	May 11, 1993	5–1	St. Louis Blues	Maple Leafs lead 3–2	W
6	May 13, 1993	1–2	@ St. Louis Blues	Series tied 3–3	L
7	May 15, 1993	6–0	St. Louis Blues	Maple Leafs win 4–3	W

Campbell Conference Finals vs. (S3) Los Angeles Kings: Kings win 4–3

Game	Date	Score	Opponent	Series	Recap
1	May 17, 1993	4–1	Los Angeles Kings	Maple Leafs lead 1–0	W
2	May 19, 1993	2–3	Los Angeles Kings	Series tied 1–1	L
3	May 21, 1993	2–4	@ Los Angeles Kings	Kings lead 2–1	L
4	May 23, 1993	4–2	@ Los Angeles Kings	Series tied 2–2	W
5	May 25, 1993	3–2 OT	Los Angeles Kings	Maple Leafs lead 3–2	W
6	May 27, 1993	4–5 OT	@ Los Angeles Kings	Series tied 3–3	L
7	May 29, 1993	4–5	Los Angeles Kings	Kings win 4–3	L

Legend: W Win L Loss

== Player statistics ==
=== Regular season ===
Scoring

Player	GP	G	A	Pts	PIM	+/-	PPG	SHG	GWG
Doug Gilmour	83	32	95	127	100	32	15	3	2
Nikolai Borschevsky	78	34	40	74	28	33	12	0	4
Glenn Anderson	76	22	43	65	117	19	11	0	3
Todd Gill	69	11	32	43	66	4	5	0	2
John Cullen	47	13	28	41	53	-8	10	0	1
Dave Ellett	70	6	34	40	46	19	4	0	1
Mike Krushelnyski	84	19	20	39	62	3	6	2	3
Wendel Clark	66	17	22	39	193	2	2	0	5
Dave Andreychuk	31	25	13	38	8	12	12	0	2
Rob Pearson	78	23	14	37	211	-2	8	0	3
Peter Zezel	70	12	23	35	24	0	0	0	4
Dmitri Mironov	59	7	24	31	40	-1	4	0	1
Mark Osborne	76	12	14	26	89	-7	0	2	2
Drake Berehowsky	41	4	15	19	61	1	1	0	1
Jamie Macoun	77	4	15	19	55	3	2	0	1
Dave McLlwain	66	14	4	18	30	-18	1	1	3
Mike Foligno	55	13	5	18	84	2	5	0	2
Bill Berg	58	7	8	15	54	-1	0	1	2
Bob Rouse	82	3	11	14	130	7	0	1	1
Sylvain Lefebvre	81	2	12	14	90	8	0	0	0
Joe Sacco	23	4	4	8	8	-4	0	0	0
Mike Eastwood	12	1	6	7	21	-2	0	0	0
Kent Manderville	18	1	1	2	17	-9	0	0	1
Ken Baumgartner	63	1	0	1	155	-11	0	0	0
Bob McGill	19	1	0	1	34	5	0	0	0
Felix Potvin	48	0	1	1	4	0	0	0	0
Grant Fuhr	29	0	0	0	0	0	0	0	0
Guy Larose	9	0	0	0	8	-3	0	0	0
Ken McRae	2	0	0	0	2	-1	0	0	0
Daren Puppa	8	0	0	0	0	0	0	0	0
Darryl Shannon	16	0	0	0	11	-5	0	0	0
Dave Tomlinson	3	0	0	0	2	0	0	0	0
Rick Wamsley	3	0	0	0	0	0	0	0	0

Goaltending

Player	MIN	GP	W	L	T	GA	GAA	SO	SA	SV	SV%
Felix Potvin	2781	48	25	15	7	116	2.50	2	1286	1170	.910
Grant Fuhr	1665	29	13	9	4	87	3.14	1	826	739	.895
Daren Puppa	479	8	6	2	0	18	2.25	2	232	214	.922
Rick Wamsley	160	3	0	3	0	15	5.63	0	91	76	.835
Team:	5085	84	44	29	11	236	2.78	5	2435	2199	.903

=== Playoffs ===
Scoring

Player	GP	G	A	Pts	PIM	PPG	SHG	GWG
Doug Gilmour	21	10	25	35	30	4	0	1
Wendel Clark	21	10	10	20	51	2	0	1
Dave Andreychuk	21	12	7	19	35	4	0	3
Glenn Anderson	21	7	11	18	31	0	0	2
Dave Ellett	21	4	8	12	8	2	0	0
Bob Rouse	21	3	8	11	29	1	0	1
Todd Gill	21	1	10	11	26	0	0	0
Mike Krushelnyski	16	3	7	10	8	1	0	0
Nikolai Borschevsky	16	2	7	9	0	0	0	1
Mike Foligno	18	2	6	8	42	1	0	2
Sylvain Lefebvre	21	3	3	6	20	0	0	0
Jamie Macoun	21	0	6	6	36	0	0	0
John Cullen	12	2	3	5	0	1	0	0
Rob Pearson	14	2	2	4	31	0	0	0
Peter Zezel	20	2	1	3	6	0	0	0
Mike Eastwood	10	1	2	3	8	0	0	0
Dmitri Mironov	14	1	2	3	2	1	0	0
Bill Berg	21	1	1	2	18	0	0	0
Mark Osborne	19	1	1	2	16	0	0	0
Ken Baumgartner	7	1	0	1	0	0	0	0
Kent Manderville	18	1	0	1	8	0	0	0
Dave McLlwain	4	0	0	0	0	0	0	0
Felix Potvin	21	0	0	0	6	0	0	0
Daren Puppa	1	0	0	0	2	0	0	0

Goaltending

Player	MIN	GP	W	L	GA	GAA	SO	SA	SV	SV%
Felix Potvin	1308	21	11	10	62	2.84	1	636	574	.903
Daren Puppa	20	1	0	0	1	3.00	0	7	6	.857
Team:	1328	21	11	10	63	2.85	1	643	580	.902

Note:

Pos = Position;GP = Games played; G = Goals; A = Assists; Pts = Points; PIM = Penalty minutes; +/- = Plus/minus; PPG = Power-play goals; SHG = Short-handed goals; GWG = Game-winning goals
Pos = Position;GP = Games played; Min, TOI = Minutes played; W = Wins; L = Losses; T,T/OT = Ties; OTL = Overtime losses; GA = Goals-against; GAA = Goals-against average; SO = Shutouts; SA = Shots against; SV = Shots saved;SV% = Save percentage;

== Awards and records ==
- Pat Burns, Jack Adams Award.
- Doug Gilmour, Selke Trophy.
- Doug Gilmour, Molson Cup (most game star selections for Toronto Maple Leafs).
- Doug Gilmour, franchise record, most points in one season, 127 points.
- Doug Gilmour, franchise record, most points by a centre in one season, 127 points.
- Doug Gilmour, franchise record, most assists in one season, 95 assists.
- Doug Gilmour, most assists in one game (6), Toronto club record.

== Transactions ==
The Maple Leafs have been involved in the following transactions during the 1992-93 season.

=== Trades ===
July 20, 1992	To Ottawa Senators Brad Marsh	To Toronto Maple Leafs Future considerations
July 21, 1992	To Quebec Nordiques Len Esau	To Toronto Maple Leafs Ken McRae
August 20, 1992	To Montreal Canadiens 3rd-round pick in 1994 – Martin Belanger	To Toronto Maple Leafs Sylvain Lefebvre
November 24, 1992	To Hartford Whalers 2nd-round pick in 1993 – Vlastimil Kroupa	To Toronto Maple Leafs John Cullen
February 2, 1993	To Buffalo Sabres Grant Fuhr; 5th-round pick in 1995 – Kevin Popp	To Toronto Maple Leafs Dave Andreychuk; Daren Puppa; 1st-round pick in 1993 – Kenny Jonsson
February 25, 1993	To Ottawa Senators 9th-round pick in 1993 – Pavol Demitra	To Toronto Maple Leafs Brad Miller

=== Waivers ===
September 9, 1992	From Tampa Bay Lightning Bob McGill
December 3, 1992	From New York Islanders; Bill Berg

=== Expansion draft ===
June 24, 1993	To Florida Panthers Daren Puppa
June 24, 1993	To Mighty Ducks of Anaheim; Joe Sacco

=== Free agents ===
Player	Former team
Rudy Poeschek	Winnipeg Jets

Player	New team
Andrew McKim	Boston Bruins
Mark Ferner	Ottawa Senators
Ric Nattress	Philadelphia Flyers

== Draft picks ==
Toronto's draft picks at the 1992 NHL entry draft held at the Montreal Forum in Montreal, Quebec.

Round	#	Player	Nationality	College/junior/club team
1	8	Brandon Convery	Canada	Sudbury Wolves (OHL)
1	23	Grant Marshall	Canada	Ottawa 67's (OHL)
4	77	Nikolai Borschevsky	Russia	Spartak Moscow (Russia)
4	95	Mark Raiter	Canada	Saskatoon Blades (WHL)
5	101	Janne Gronvall	Finland	Lukko (Finland)
5	106	Chris DeRuiter	Canada	Kingston Frontenacs (OHL)
6	125	Mikael Hakanson	Sweden	Nacka HK (Sweden)
7	149	Patrik Augusta	Czechoslovakia	Dukla Jihlava (Czechoslovakia)
8	173	Ryan VandenBussche	Canada	Cornwall Royals (OHL)
9	197	Wayne Clarke	Canada	Rensselaer Polytechnic Institute (ECAC)
10	221	Sergei Simonov	Russia	Kristall Saratov (Russia)
11	245	Nathan Dempsey	Canada	Regina Pats (WHL)
S	5	Nick Wohlers	Canada	St. Thomas University (AUAA)

== Farm teams ==
- The Maple Leafs' farm team was the St. John's Maple Leafs in St. John's, Newfoundland.
