= Shawn Cronin =

American ice hockey player (born 1963)

- Born: August 20, 1963 (age 61); Joliet, Illinois, U.S.
- Height: 6 ft 2 in (188 cm)
- Weight: 210 lb (95 kg; 15 st 0 lb)
- Position: Defense
- Shot: Left
- Played for: Washington Capitals; Winnipeg Jets; Philadelphia Flyers; San Jose Sharks
- NHL draft: Undrafted
- Playing career: 1986–1997

Shawn P. Cronin (born August 20, 1963) is an American former professional ice hockey defenseman who played in the National Hockey League (NHL) for the Washington Capitals, Winnipeg Jets, Philadelphia Flyers and San Jose Sharks. Cronin was born in Joliet, Illinois and grew up in Flushing, Michigan, graduating from Flushing Senior High School.

== Playing career ==
Cronin was originally signed as a free agent in 1986 by the Hartford Whalers, although he never played for the parent team. In 1988 he was signed as a free agent by the Washington Capitals. After playing only one game for the Capitals he signed with the Winnipeg Jets. It was with Winnipeg where he played most of his NHL games, suiting up 193 times over three seasons. He scored one goal for the Jets during that time. Upon scoring his first goal (against the Quebec Nordiques in November 1990), McDonald's commemorated the feat by donating $4,400 to the Winnipeg Jets Goals for Kids Charity. (Cronin's number with Winnipeg was the number 44, hence the $4,400 donation).

He also played for the Philadelphia Flyers and San Jose Sharks. It was with Philadelphia that he scored two goals in one season (one of which was scored against his former team at the Winnipeg Arena). He recorded the 1st San Jose Shark playoff goal in team history. He retired from the NHL having scored three goals over seven seasons of play.

== Career statistics ==
| | | | Regular season | | | | | Playoffs |
| Season | Team | League | GP | G | A | Pts | PIM | GP | G | A | Pts | PIM |
|---|---|---|---|---|---|---|---|---|---|---|---|---|
| 1982–83 | University of Illinois-Chicago | NCAA | 36 | 1 | 5 | 6 | 52 | — | — | — | — | — |
| 1983–84 | University of Illinois-Chicago | NCAA | 32 | 0 | 4 | 4 | 41 | — | — | — | — | — |
| 1984–85 | University of Illinois-Chicago | NCAA | 31 | 2 | 6 | 8 | 52 | — | — | — | — | — |
| 1985–86 | University of Illinois-Chicago | NCAA | 35 | 3 | 8 | 11 | 70 | — | — | — | — | — |
| 1986–87 | Salt Lake Golden Eagles | IHL | 53 | 8 | 16 | 24 | 118 | — | — | — | — | — |
| 1986–87 | Binghamton Whalers | AHL | 12 | 1 | 0 | 1 | 60 | 10 | 0 | 0 | 0 | 41 |
| 1987–88 | Binghamton Whalers | AHL | 66 | 3 | 8 | 11 | 212 | 4 | 0 | 0 | 0 | 15 |
| 1988–89 | Washington Capitals | NHL | 1 | 0 | 0 | 0 | 0 | — | — | — | — | — |
| 1988–89 | Baltimore Skipjacks | AHL | 75 | 3 | 9 | 12 | 267 | — | — | — | — | — |
| 1989–90 | Winnipeg Jets | NHL | 61 | 0 | 4 | 4 | 243 | 5 | 0 | 0 | 0 | 7 |
| 1990–91 | Winnipeg Jets | NHL | 67 | 1 | 5 | 6 | 189 | — | — | — | — | — |
| 1991–92 | Winnipeg Jets | NHL | 65 | 0 | 4 | 4 | 271 | 4 | 0 | 0 | 0 | 6 |
| 1992–93 | Hershey Bears | AHL | 7 | 0 | 1 | 1 | 12 | — | — | — | — | — |
| 1992–93 | Philadelphia Flyers | NHL | 35 | 2 | 1 | 3 | 37 | — | — | — | — | — |
| 1993–94 | San Jose Sharks | NHL | 34 | 0 | 2 | 2 | 76 | 14 | 1 | 0 | 1 | 20 |
| 1994–95 | San Jose Sharks | NHL | 29 | 0 | 2 | 2 | 61 | 9 | 0 | 0 | 0 | 5 |
| 1995–96 | Fort Wayne Komets | IHL | 48 | 0 | 1 | 1 | 120 | 5 | 0 | 0 | 0 | 8 |
| 1996–97 | Fort Wayne Komets | IHL | 13 | 0 | 1 | 1 | 27 | — | — | — | — | — |
| NHL totals | | | 292 | 3 | 18 | 21 | 887 | 32 | 1 | 0 | 1 | 38 |
