= 1992–93 Philadelphia Flyers season =

NHL hockey team season

1992–93 Philadelphia Flyers
- Division: 5th Patrick
- Conference: 9th Wales
- 1992–93 record: 36–37–11
- Home record: 23–14–5
- Road record: 13–23–6
- Goals for: 319 (13th)
- Goals against: 319 (17th)

Team information
- General manager: Russ Farwell
- Coach: Bill Dineen
- Captain: Vacant
- Alternate captains: Keith Acton; Terry Carkner; Kevin Dineen
- Arena: Spectrum
- Average attendance: 17,281
- Minor league affiliate: Hershey Bears

Team leaders
- Goals: Mark Recchi (53)
- Assists: Mark Recchi (70)
- Points: Mark Recchi (123)
- Penalty minutes: Ryan McGill (238)
- Plus/minus: Eric Lindros (+28)
- Wins: Tommy Soderstrom (20)
- Goals against average: Tommy Soderstrom (3.42)

The 1992–93 Philadelphia Flyers season was the franchise's 26th season in the National Hockey League (NHL). The Flyers added Eric Lindros in a blockbuster trade, but the team failed to make the Stanley Cup playoffs for the fourth straight season.

== Off-season ==
In June 1992, the Flyers won the arbitration battle for 1991 first-overall pick Eric Lindros over the New York Rangers. It was determined that the Quebec Nordiques had made a deal with the Flyers before making a deal with the Rangers. In order to acquire Lindros' rights, the Flyers parted with six players, trading Steve Duchesne, Ron Hextall, Kerry Huffman, Mike Ricci, Chris Simon, the rights to Peter Forsberg, two first-round draft picks and $15 million to Quebec.

== Regular season ==
The trio of Lindros, Mark Recchi and Brent Fedyk formed the "Crazy Eights" line in Lindros' first two years in the league, the eights being the player's jersey numbers (88, 8 and 18 respectively). Recchi set the franchise record for points in a season with 123 (53 goals, 70 assists) and Lindros scored 41 goals in 61 games. Rod Brind'Amour added 86 points (37 goals, 49 assists) of his own. Four Flyers reached the 30-goal plateau and goaltender Tommy Soderstrom finished with five shutouts: second in the NHL only to Ed Belfour of the Chicago Blackhawks. The Flyers did not name a replacement captain after Rick Tocchet was traded the previous season and instead chose to go with three alternate captains. After struggling early the Flyers made a run at the playoffs, winning their final eight regular-season games, but came four points short of the last spot.

On March 13, the Flyers game against the Los Angeles Kings was postponed after one period after high winds from the 1993 Storm of the Century smashed a large window at the Spectrum. It was the first in-progress game in NHL history to be postponed due to weather. The game was restarted from the beginning on April 1. The game originally scheduled for that date against the Toronto Maple Leafs was moved to April 4.

The Flyers had the fewest power play opportunities during the regular season, with 399.

=== Season standings ===
Patrick Division
	GP	W	L	T	Pts	GF	GA
**Pittsburgh Penguins**	84	56	21	7	**119**	367	268
**Washington Capitals**	84	43	34	7	**93**	325	286
**New York Islanders**	84	40	37	7	**87**	335	297
**New Jersey Devils**	84	40	37	7	**87**	308	299
Philadelphia Flyers	84	36	37	11	83	319	319
New York Rangers	84	34	39	11	79	304	308

Note: GP = Games played, W = Wins, L = Losses, T = Ties, Pts = Points, GF = Goals for, GA = Goals against
Note: Teams that qualified for the playoffs are highlighted in bold.

Wales Conference
R		Div	GP	W	L	T	GF	GA	Pts
**1**	**p – Pittsburgh Penguins**	**PTK**	**84**	**56**	**21**	**7**	**367**	**268**	**119**
**2**	**Boston Bruins**	**ADM**	**84**	**51**	**26**	**7**	**332**	**268**	**109**
**3**	**Quebec Nordiques**	**ADM**	**84**	**47**	**27**	**10**	**351**	**300**	**104**
**4**	**Montreal Canadiens**	**ADM**	**84**	**48**	**30**	**6**	**326**	**280**	**102**
**5**	**Washington Capitals**	**PTK**	**84**	**43**	**34**	**7**	**325**	**286**	**93**
**6**	**New York Islanders**	**PTK**	**84**	**40**	**37**	**7**	**335**	**297**	**87**
**7**	**New Jersey Devils**	**PTK**	**84**	**40**	**37**	**7**	**308**	**299**	**87**
**8**	**Buffalo Sabres**	**ADM**	**84**	**38**	**36**	**10**	**335**	**297**	**86**
9	Philadelphia Flyers	PTK	84	36	37	11	319	319	83
10	New York Rangers	PTK	84	34	39	11	304	308	79
11	Hartford Whalers	ADM	84	26	52	6	284	369	58
12	Ottawa Senators	ADM	84	10	70	4	202	395	24

p – Won Presidents' Trophy (and division)
Divisions: PTK – Patrick, ADM – Adams
bold – Qualified for playoffs

== Schedule and results ==
1992–93 regular season
October: 3–7–3, 9 points (home: 2–2–1; road: 1–5–2)

Game	Date	Score	Opponent	Decision	Record	Points	Recap
1	October 6	3–3 OT	@ Pittsburgh Penguins	Roussel	0–0–1	1	T
2	October 9	6–4	New Jersey Devils	Roussel	1–0–1	3	W
3	October 10	4–2	@ Washington Capitals	Roussel	2–0–1	5	W
4	October 13	3–6	@ Quebec Nordiques	Roussel	2–1–1	5	L
5	October 15	4–5	New York Islanders	Roussel	2–2–1	5	L
6	October 17	0–2	@ New Jersey Devils	Beauregard	2–3–1	5	L
7	October 18	5–4	Winnipeg Jets	Roussel	3–3–1	7	W
8	October 20	3–4	@ New York Islanders	Beauregard	3–4–1	7	L
9	October 22	4–4 OT	Vancouver Canucks	Roussel	3–4–2	8	T
10	October 24	6–7	Montreal Canadiens	Roussel	3–5–2	8	L
11	October 26	4–8	@ New York Rangers	Roussel	3–6–2	8	L
12	October 29	5–5 OT	@ Chicago Blackhawks	Roussel	3–6–3	9	T
13	October 31	4–6	@ St. Louis Blues	Roussel	3–7–3	9	L

November: 6–3–1, 13 points (home: 5–0–1; road: 1–3–0)

Game	Date	Score	Opponent	Decision	Record	Points	Recap
14	November 4	1–3	@ New York Rangers	Beauregard	3–8–3	9	L
15	November 7	4–2	St. Louis Blues	Beauregard	4–8–3	11	W
16	November 12	8–5	New York Islanders	Beauregard	5–8–3	13	W
17	November 14	4–3 OT	@ Montreal Canadiens	Roussel	6–8–3	15	W
18	November 15	7–2	Ottawa Senators	Roussel	7–8–3	17	W
19	November 19	7–3	New York Rangers	Roussel	8–8–3	19	W
20	November 21	3–4	@ Boston Bruins	Beauregard	8–9–3	19	L
21	November 22	4–4 OT	Buffalo Sabres	Roussel	8–9–4	20	T
22	November 27	6–3	New York Islanders	Roussel	9–9–4	22	W
23	November 28	3–9	@ New York Islanders	Beauregard	9–10–4	22	L

December: 4–8–1, 9 points (home: 2–4–0; road: 2–4–1)

Game	Date	Score	Opponent	Decision	Record	Points	Recap
24	December 3	3–2 OT	Quebec Nordiques	Beauregard	10–10–4	24	W
25	December 5	2–3	@ Ottawa Senators	Beauregard	10–11–4	24	L
26	December 6	1–7	Boston Bruins	Beauregard	10–12–4	24	L
27	December 11	2–4	@ Detroit Red Wings	Roussel	10–13–4	24	L
28	December 12	2–5	Washington Capitals	Beauregard	10–14–4	24	L
29	December 15	2–6	@ Pittsburgh Penguins	Beauregard	10–15–4	24	L
30	December 17	4–5 OT	Pittsburgh Penguins	Soderstrom	10–16–4	24	L
31	December 19	3–1	Chicago Blackhawks	Soderstrom	11–16–4	26	W
32	December 20	1–4	@ Tampa Bay Lightning	Soderstrom	11–17–4	26	L
33	December 23	0–4	Pittsburgh Penguins	Soderstrom	11–18–4	26	L
34	December 26	5–5 OT	@ Washington Capitals	Soderstrom	11–18–5	27	T
35	December 29	10–2	@ Los Angeles Kings	Soderstrom	12–18–5	29	W
36	December 30	6–2	@ San Jose Sharks	Soderstrom	13–18–5	31	W

January: 5–8–2, 12 points (home: 4–4–1; road: 1–4–1)

Game	Date	Score	Opponent	Decision	Record	Points	Recap
37	January 2	3–7	@ Calgary Flames	Soderstrom	13–19–5	31	L
38	January 3	2–2 OT	@ Edmonton Oilers	Soderstrom	13–19–6	32	T
39	January 7	8–2	Washington Capitals	Soderstrom	14–19–6	34	W
40	January 9	4–3	New York Rangers	Soderstrom	15–19–6	36	W
41	January 10	4–0	Edmonton Oilers	Soderstrom	16–19–6	38	W
42	January 14	4–4 OT	Calgary Flames	Soderstrom	16–19–7	39	T
43	January 16	5–4	@ Boston Bruins	Soderstrom	17–19–7	41	W
44	January 17	4–7	Detroit Red Wings	Soderstrom	17–20–7	41	L
45	January 21	4–5	Boston Bruins	Soderstrom	17–21–7	41	L
46	January 23	4–8	@ New York Islanders	Soderstrom	17–22–7	41	L
47	January 24	5–4 OT	Hartford Whalers	Soderstrom	18–22–7	43	W
48	January 26	3–4 OT	Buffalo Sabres	Roussel	18–23–7	43	L
49	January 28	3–6	Quebec Nordiques	Roussel	18–24–7	43	L
50	January 30	2–4	@ Pittsburgh Penguins	Soderstrom	18–25–7	43	L
51	January 31	4–6	@ Montreal Canadiens	Roussel	18–26–7	43	L

February: 4–4–4, 12 points (home: 2–2–2; road: 2–2–2)

Game	Date	Score	Opponent	Decision	Record	Points	Recap
52	February 3	2–2 OT	@ New York Rangers	Soderstrom	18–26–8	44	T
53	February 9	8–1	Ottawa Senators	Soderstrom	19–26–8	46	W
54	February 11	0–0 OT	Montreal Canadiens	Soderstrom	19–26–9	47	T
55	February 13	4–6	@ New Jersey Devils	Soderstrom	19–27–9	47	L
56	February 14	2–5	New Jersey Devils	Soderstrom	19–28–9	47	L
57^{[a]}	February 16	4–4 OT	@ Calgary Flames	Soderstrom	19–28–10	48	T
58	February 18	3–2	@ Vancouver Canucks	Soderstrom	20–28–10	50	W
59	February 20	2–5	@ Minnesota North Stars	Soderstrom	20–29–10	50	L
60^{[b]}	February 22	5–5 OT	Detroit Red Wings	Roussel	20–29–11	51	T
61	February 24	5–2	@ Hartford Whalers	Roussel	21–29–11	53	W
62	February 25	6–2	New Jersey Devils	Roussel	22–29–11	55	W
63	February 27	2–3	New York Islanders	Roussel	22–30–11	55	L
Notes:^{a} Neutral site game played at the Riverfront Coliseum in Cincinnati, Ohio.^{b} Neutral site game played at the Richfield Coliseum in Richfield Township, Ohio.

March: 6–6–0, 12 points (home: 4–1–0; road: 2–5–0)

Game	Date	Score	Opponent	Decision	Record	Points	Recap
64	March 2	5–4	Pittsburgh Penguins	Soderstrom	23–30–11	57	W
65	March 5	3–0	@ Washington Capitals	Soderstrom	24–30–11	59	W
66	March 7	3–7	@ New Jersey Devils	Soderstrom	24–31–11	59	L
67	March 9	2–4	@ New York Islanders	Soderstrom	24–32–11	59	L
68	March 11	6–4	Washington Capitals	Soderstrom	25–32–11	61	W
69	March 16	4–3	Minnesota North Stars	Soderstrom	26–32–11	63	W
70	March 20	3–9	@ Pittsburgh Penguins	Soderstrom	26–33–11	63	L
71	March 21	2–3	New Jersey Devils	Soderstrom	26–34–11	63	L
72	March 24	5–4	@ New York Rangers	Soderstrom	27–34–11	65	W
73	March 25	5–2	San Jose Sharks	Roussel	28–34–11	67	W
74	March 27	3–8	@ Quebec Nordiques	Soderstrom	28–35–11	67	L
75	March 30	1–2	@ New York Islanders	Roussel	28–36–11	67	L

April: 8–1–0, 16 points (home: 4–1–0; road: 4–0–0)

Game	Date	Score	Opponent	Decision	Record	Points	Recap
76	April 1	1–3	Los Angeles Kings	Soderstrom	28–37–11	67	L
77	April 3	6–2	Tampa Bay Lightning	Roussel	29–37–11	69	W
78	April 4	4–0	Toronto Maple Leafs	Soderstrom	30–37–11	71	W
79	April 6	4–2	@ Winnipeg Jets	Soderstrom	31–37–11	73	W
80	April 8	4–3	Washington Capitals	Soderstrom	32–37–11	75	W
81	April 10	4–0	@ Toronto Maple Leafs	Soderstrom	33–37–11	77	W
82	April 12	1–0	New York Rangers	Roussel	34–37–11	79	W
83	April 15	7–4	@ Buffalo Sabres	Soderstrom	35–37–11	81	W
84	April 16	5–4 OT	@ Hartford Whalers	Roussel	36–37–11	83	W

Legend: W Win (2 points) L Loss (0 points) T Tie (1 point)

== Player statistics ==
=== Scoring ===
- Position abbreviations: C = Center; D = Defense; G = Goaltender; LW = Left wing; RW = Right wing
- † = Joined team via a transaction (e.g., trade, waivers, signing) during the season. Stats reflect time with the Flyers only.
- ‡ = Left team via a transaction (e.g., trade, waivers, release) during the season. Stats reflect time with the Flyers only.

No.	Player	Pos	Regular season					
No.	Player	Pos	GP	G	A	Pts	+/-	PIM
8	Mark Recchi	RW	84	53	70	123	1	95
17	Rod Brind'Amour	C	81	37	49	86	−8	89
88	Eric Lindros	C	61	41	34	75	28	147
11 (Note: Dineen wore number 20 through December 11.)	Kevin Dineen	RW	83	35	28	63	14	201
3	Garry Galley	D	83	13	49	62	18	115
18	Brent Fedyk	LW	74	21	38	59	14	48
9	Pelle Eklund	LW	55	11	38	49	12	16
12	Greg Paslawski‡	RW	60	14	19	33	0	12
2	Dmitri Yushkevich	D	82	5	27	32	12	71
20	Greg Hawgood†	D	40	6	22	28	−7	39
19	Brian Benning‡	D	37	9	17	26	0	93
42	Josef Beranek†	RW	40	13	12	25	−1	50
25	Keith Acton	C	83	8	15	23	−10	51
15	Doug Evans	LW	65	8	13	21	−9	70
23	Andrei Lomakin	LW	51	8	12	20	15	34
29	Terry Carkner	D	83	3	16	19	18	150
5	Ric Nattress	D	44	7	10	17	1	29
22	Vyacheslav Butsayev	C	52	2	14	16	3	61
27	Ryan McGill	D	72	3	10	13	9	238
10	Claude Boivin	LW	30	5	4	9	−5	76
26	Gord Hynes	D	37	3	4	7	−3	16
14	Mark Pederson‡	LW	14	3	4	7	−2	6
46	Al Conroy	C	21	3	2	5	−1	17
34	Len Barrie	C	8	2	2	4	2	9
36	Andre Faust	LW	10	2	2	4	5	4
11	Steve Kasper‡	C	21	1	3	4	−4	2
44	Shawn Cronin	D	35	2	1	3	0	37
21	Dave Brown	RW	70	0	2	2	−5	78
33	Dominic Roussel	G	34	0	2	2		11
14	Dave Snuggerud†‡	RW	14	0	2	2	0	0
30	Tommy Soderstrom	G	44	0	2	2		4
28	Jason Bowen	D	7	1	0	1	1	2
35	Stephane Beauregard	G	16	0	1	1		0
41	Glenn Mulvenna	C	1	0	0	0	1	2

=== Goaltending ===
No.	Player	Regular season										
No.	Player	GP	GS	W	L	T	SA	GA	GAA	SV%	SO	TOI
30	Tommy Soderstrom	44	41	20	17	6	1327	143	3.42	.892	5	2,512
33	Dominic Roussel	34	29	13	11	5	933	111	3.76	.881	1	1,769
35	Stephane Beauregard	16	14	3	9	0	405	59	4.41	.854	0	802

== Awards and records ==
=== Awards ===
Type	Award/honor	Recipient	Ref
League (annual)	NHL All-Rookie Team	Eric Lindros (Forward)	
League (in-season)	NHL All-Star Game selection	Mark Recchi	
League (in-season)	NHL Player of the Week	Mark Recchi (November 16)	
League (in-season)	NHL Player of the Week	Tommy Soderstrom (January 11) (Note: Co-winner with St. Louis Blues' Guy Hebert)	
Team	Barry Ashbee Trophy	Garry Galley	
Team	Bobby Clarke Trophy	Mark Recchi	
Team	Class Guy Award	Mark Recchi	

=== Records ===
Among the team records set during the 1992–93 season was Eric Lindros scoring the fastest goal from the start of a period (five seconds) in team history on November 12. On April 15, Kevin Dineen tied team records for most shorthanded goals scored during a game (2) and most points in a single period (4). On the season, Mark Recchi registered a team record 123 points in his first full season with the Flyers, surpassing Bobby Clarke’s 119 points in 1975–76. Lindros set a team rookie record with 41 goals scored. The 319 goals against by the Flyers during the season is a franchise high.

=== Milestones ===
Milestone	Player	Date	Ref
First game	Vyacheslav Butsayev	October 6, 1992	
First game	Eric Lindros	October 6, 1992	
First game	Dmitri Yushkevich	October 6, 1992	
First game	Tommy Soderstrom	December 17, 1992	
First game	Andre Faust	January 17, 1993	
First game	Jason Bowen	April 4, 1993	

== Transactions ==
The Flyers were involved in the following transactions from June 2, 1992, the day after the deciding game of the 1992 Stanley Cup Final, through June 9, 1993, the day of the deciding game of the 1993 Stanley Cup Final.

=== Trades ===
Date	Details		Ref
June 20, 1992 (Note: As part of the original trade made on June 20, the Flyers would have parted with Duchesne, Hextall, Huffman, Ricci, the rights to Forsberg, the Flyers 1st-round pick in 1992 (7th overall) and 1993 and $15 million. Since the Flyers used the 1992 pick to select Ryan Sittler and Quebec had no interest in Sittler, the Flyers and Nordiques had to agree on a substitution for the pick. On July 21, arbitrator Larry Bertuzzi ruled that Chris Simon and the Flyers' 1994 first-round pick would be added to the trade.)	To Philadelphia Flyers: Rights to Eric Lindros	To Quebec Nordiques: Steve Duchesne; Ron Hextall; Kerry Huffman; Mike Ricci; Chris Simon; Rights to Peter Forsberg; 1st-round pick in 1993; 1st-round pick in 1994; $15 million	
October 1, 1992	To Philadelphia Flyers: Brent Fedyk	To Detroit Red Wings: 4th-round pick in 1993	
October 1, 1992	To Philadelphia Flyers: Stephane Beauregard	To Winnipeg Jets: 3rd-round pick in 1993; 5th-round pick in 1994	
December 8, 1992	To Philadelphia Flyers: Dan Vincelette	To Tampa Bay Lightning: Steve Kasper	
December 19, 1992	To Philadelphia Flyers: Dave Snuggerud	To San Jose Sharks: Mark Pederson	
January 16, 1993	To Philadelphia Flyers: Josef Beranek; Greg Hawgood	To Edmonton Oilers: Brian Benning	
February 2, 1993	To Philadelphia Flyers: Bob Wilkie	To Detroit Red Wings: Future considerations	
February 7, 1993 (Note: The trade was nullified by the NHL on February 9 since it violated league rules. A player traded within four weeks of the NHL waiver draft cannot be reacquired by the team which traded him for the remainder of the season. After the season the Flyers traded Beauregard back to the Jets.)	To Philadelphia Flyers: Philadelphia's 3rd-round pick in 1993; Future considerations	To Winnipeg Jets: Stephane Beauregard	
March 18, 1993	To Philadelphia Flyers: 9th-round pick in 1993	To Toronto Maple Leafs: Greg Paslawski	

=== Players acquired ===
Date	Player	Former team	Term	Via	Ref
July 11, 1992	Glenn Mulvenna	Pittsburgh Penguins		Free agency	
August 20, 1992	Ric Nattress	Toronto Maple Leafs	4-year	Free agency	
August 26, 1992	Gord Hynes	Boston Bruins		Free agency	
August 26, 1992	Greg Paslawski	Quebec Nordiques		Free agency	
October 4, 1992	Shawn Cronin	Quebec Nordiques		Waiver draft	
October 4, 1992	Doug Evans	Quebec Nordiques		Waiver draft	
October 5, 1992	Andre Faust	Princeton University (ECAC)		Free agency	
December 14, 1992	Daniel Dore	Quebec Nordiques		Free agency	

=== Players lost ===
Date	Player	New team	Via	Ref
N/A	Rod Dallman		Retirement	
N/A	Martin Hostak	Modo Hockey (Elitserien)	Free agency	
June 18, 1992	Mark Freer	Ottawa Senators	Expansion draft	
June 18, 1992	Darren Rumble	Ottawa Senators	Expansion draft	
July 8, 1992	Mark Howe	Detroit Red Wings	Free agency	
August 4, 1992	Brad Jones		Buyout	
October 5, 1992	Dan Quinn	Minnesota North Stars	Free agency	
October 1992	Moe Mantha		Retirement	
November 1992	Dale Kushner	Capital District Islanders (AHL) (Note: Kushner signed with Capital District late in the 1992–93 season.)	Release	
December 14, 1992	Reid Simpson	Minnesota North Stars	Free agency	
January 25, 1993	Kimbi Daniels		Buyout	
February 12, 1993	Dave Snuggerud		Retirement	

=== Signings ===
Date	Player	Term	Ref
July 1, 1992	Tommy Soderstrom		
July 14, 1992	Eric Lindros	6-year	
August 4, 1992	Corey Foster		
August 4, 1992	Scott LaGrand		
August 4, 1992	Ryan McGill		
August 4, 1992	Mark Pederson		
August 6, 1992	Claude Boivin	4-year	
September 9, 1992	Dmitri Yushkevich		
September 21, 1992	Vyacheslav Butsayev		
September 22, 1992	Jason Bowen		
October 7, 1992	Dominic Roussel	3-year (Note: Third year is option year)	
December 8, 1992	Rod Brind'Amour	4-year	
December 9, 1992	Kevin Dineen	3-year	
March 4, 1993	Greg Hawgood	multi-year	
April 6, 1993	Aris Brimanis		

== Draft picks ==
=== NHL entry draft ===
Philadelphia's picks at the 1992 NHL entry draft, which was held at the Montreal Forum in Montreal, Quebec, on June 20, 1992. The Flyers traded their third-round pick, 55th overall, Brian Dobbin, Gord Murphy, and their 1993 fourth-round pick to the Boston Bruins for Garry Galley, Wes Walz and the Bruins' 1993 third-round pick on January 2, 1992. They also traded their fourth-round pick, 79th overall, and Murray Craven to the Hartford Whalers for Kevin Dineen on November 13, 1991.

Round	Pick	Player	Position	Nationality	Team (league)	Notes
1	7	Ryan Sittler	Left wing	Canada	Nichols School (USHS-NY)	
1	15	Jason Bowen	Left wing	Canada	Tri-City Americans (WHL)	(Note: The Flyers acquired the Los Angeles Kings' first-round pick, 15th overall, along with Brian Benning and Mark Recchi from the Pittsburgh Penguins for Kjell Samuelsson, Rick Tocchet, Ken Wregget, and the Flyers' 1993 third-round pick on February 19, 1992.)
2	31	Denis Metlyuk	Left wing	Russia	Lada Togliatti (Russia)	
5	103	Vladislav Bulin	Defense	Russia	Dizel Penza (Russia)	
6	127	Roman Zolotov	Defense	Russia	Moscow Dynamo (Russia)	
7	151	Kirk Daubenspeck	Goaltender	United States	Culver Military Academy (USHS-IN)	
8	175	Claude Jutras	Right wing	Canada	Hull Olympiques (QMJHL)	
9	199	Jonas Hakansson	Left wing	Sweden	Malmö IF (Elitserien)	
10	223	Chris Herperger	Center	Canada	Swift Current Broncos (WHL)	
11	247	Patrice Paquin	Left wing	Canada	Beauport Harfangs (QMJHL)	

=== NHL supplemental draft ===
Philadelphia's picks at the 1992 NHL supplemental draft on June 19, 1992.

Round	Pick	Player	Position	Nationality	Team (league)
1	7	Garett MacDonald	Defense	Canada	Northern Michigan University (CCHA)

== Farm teams ==
The Flyers were affiliated with the Hershey Bears of the American Hockey League. Led by Tim Tookey's 108-point season, Hershey finished 5th in their division and missed the playoffs.
