= Denis Kulyash =

Russian ice hockey player (born 1983)

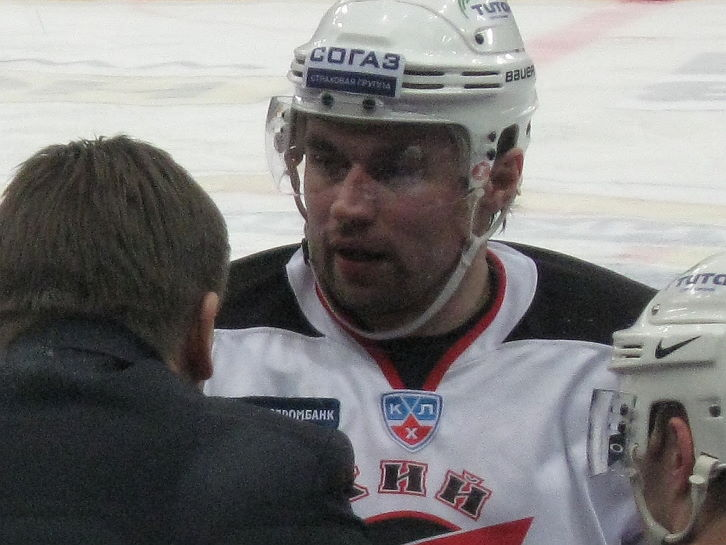
- On a game KHL SKA-Avangard (Ice Palace, St.Petersburg, Russia, 29.11.2010)
- Born: May 31, 1983 (age 42) Omsk, Soviet Union
- Height: 1.90 m (6 ft 3 in)
- Weight: 109 kg (240 lb; 17 st 2 lb)
- Position: Defence
- Shot: Left
- Erste Liga team Former teams: HSC Csíkszereda; CSKA Moscow; Dynamo Moscow; Avangard Omsk; Ak Bars Kazan; Salavat Yulaev Ufa; Avtomobilist Yekaterinburg; Severstal Cherepovets; Daemyung Killer Whales
- National team: Russia
- NHL draft: 243rd overall, 2004; Nashville Predators
- Playing career: 2003–2022

Denis Kulyash (Russian: Денис Куляш), born on 31 May 1983 in Omsk (Russian Federation) is a professional ice hockey defenceman who is currently playing for the HSC Csíkszereda of the Erste Liga. On 6 November 2020 the Romanian Government offered him Romanian citizenship. Kulyash has been a long-time member of Russia's national ice hockey team known for his extremely hard slap shot, which gained him a nickname "Tsar Cannon" (Russian: Царь-пушка). Kulyash currently holds the record for the fastest ice hockey shot with a speed of 110.3 miles per hour (177.5 km/h) previously held by Boston Bruins defenceman Zdeno Chara.

== Early life ==
Denis is the son of Vladislav and Nina Kulyash, both from Omsk.

== Playing career ==
After failing to make it into the senior team of Avangard Omsk, Denis Kulyash made his Russian Super League debut with HC CSKA, enjoying significant success with the club and as a result getting drafted by the Nashville Predators late in the 2004 NHL entry draft. The young defenceman then signed with HC Dynamo Moscow in a hotly contested transfer and struggled to play at the same level. His career got back on track when he delivered a productive 2007-08 season after returning to HC CSKA in 2007. In February 2009, Kulyash scored his 50th career goal and thus became a member of the "Fetisov Club".

In January 2010, Kulyash was controversially traded to his home-town club Avangard Omsk in return for two other defencemen, Filipp Metlyuk and Evgeny Kurbatov. He went public with his discontent blaming HC CSKA's General Manager Sergei Nemchinov for the trade. However, Kulyash was quick to retreat expressing his delight at joining his native team. The defenceman managed to score against Metallurg Novokuznetsk, his second game in Avangard's jersey, but was injured in the next game and failed to make an impact throughout the rest of the disappointing season for the club.

In February 2011, Kulyash set the new world record for hardest shot during the KHL All-Star Superskills Competition. His result is 110.3 mph (177.6 km/h).

On May 3, 2011, Kulyash was announced as the new player of the KHL's Ak Bars Kazan. In May 2013 he signed a new two-year contract with Avangard Omsk.

During the 2018-19 season, his 11th in the KHL, Kulyash made 24 appearances with Severstal Cherepovets, before leaving the club and the league to sign for the remainder of the campaign with Korean club, Daemyung Killer Whales, of the AL.

== Career statistics ==
=== Regular season and playoffs ===
			Regular season					Playoffs
Season	Team	League	GP	G	A	Pts	PIM	GP	G	A	Pts	PIM
1999–2000	Avangard–VDV Omsk	RUS.3	2	0	0	0	0	—	—	—	—	—
2000–01	Gazovik Tyumen	RUS.3	9	0	0	0	0	—	—	—	—	—
2001–02	Progress Solikamsk	RUS.3	38	3	8	11	62	—	—	—	—	—
2002–03	CSK VVS–2 Samara	RUS.3	24	10	9	19	73	—	—	—	—	—
2003–04	Omskie Yastreby	RUS.3	8	2	4	6	8	—	—	—	—	—
2003–04	CSKA Moscow	RSL	10	1	0	1	8	—	—	—	—	—
2003–04	CSKA–2 Moscow	RUS.3	9	2	1	3	32	—	—	—	—	—
2004–05	CSKA Moscow	RSL	59	8	10	18	58	—	—	—	—	—
2004–05	CSKA–2 Moscow	RUS.3	3	0	1	1	6	—	—	—	—	—
2005–06	Dynamo Moscow	RSL	44	12	5	17	117	4	0	2	2	6
2006–07	Dynamo Moscow	RSL	48	3	9	12	58	2	0	0	0	2
2006–07	Dynamo–2 Moscow	RUS.3	6	0	2	2	18	—	—	—	—	—
2007–08	CSKA Moscow	RSL	53	9	13	22	79	6	1	1	2	34
2008–09	CSKA–2 Moscow	RUS.3	—	—	—	—	—	4	0	2	2	4
2008–09	CSKA Moscow	KHL	56	16	10	26	62	8	2	1	3	20
2009–10	CSKA Moscow	KHL	35	11	10	21	34	—	—	—	—	—
2009–10	Avangard Omsk	KHL	6	1	1	2	6	3	0	0	0	4
2010–11	Avangard Omsk	KHL	48	11	15	26	45	14	3	3	6	12
2011–12	Ak Bars Kazan	KHL	44	6	12	18	40	12	0	1	1	37
2012–13	Ak Bars Kazan	KHL	44	4	9	13	66	18	2	5	7	6
2013–14	Avangard Omsk	KHL	51	11	11	22	57	—	—	—	—	—
2014–15	Avangard Omsk	KHL	58	10	17	27	58	11	2	0	2	0
2015–16	Avangard Omsk	KHL	39	5	9	14	65	—	—	—	—	—
2016–17	Salavat Yulaev Ufa	KHL	58	12	10	22	46	5	1	0	1	6
2017–18	Salavat Yulaev Ufa	KHL	16	2	3	5	20	—	—	—	—	—
2017–18	Avtomobilist Yekaterinburg	KHL	32	7	7	14	32	1	0	0	0	2
2018–19	Severstal Cherepovets	KHL	24	2	4	6	41	—	—	—	—	—
2018–19	Daemyung Killer Whales	ALH	11	1	3	4	20	3	0	1	1	0
2019–20	HSC Csíkszereda	EL	38	14	18	32	42	7	2	4	6	10
2019–20	HSC Csíkszereda	ROU	26	16	18	34	20	—	—	—	—	—
2020–21	HSC Csíkszereda	EL	19	5	7	12		9	2	3	5
2020–21	HSC Csíkszereda	ROU	15	9	15	24	45	—	—	—	—	—
2021–22	HSC Csíkszereda	EL	34	12	15	27	39	14	4	7	11	14
2021–22	HSC Csíkszereda	ROU	20	13	13	26	12	1	0	1	1	0
RSL totals			214	33	37	70	320	12	1	3	4	42
KHL totals			511	98	118	216	572	72	10	10	20	87

=== International ===
Year	Team	Event	Result	GP	G	A	Pts	PIM
2006	Russia	WC	5th	7	3	1	4	6
Senior totals				7	3	1	4	6

== Records ==
Denis Kulyash set the new world record for shot power, 110.3 mph (177.6 km/h) during the KHL All Star Superskills Competition on 3rd Kontinental Hockey League All-Star Game.
