= Andrei Vasilyev (ice hockey) =

Russian ice hockey player

- Born: March 30, 1972 (age 54) Voskresensk, Soviet Union
- Height: 5 ft 9 in (175 cm)
- Weight: 180 lb (82 kg; 12 st 12 lb)
- Position: Left wing
- Shot: Right
- Played for: New York Islanders; Phoenix Coyotes; CSKA Moscow; Khimik Voskresensk; Avangard Omsk; Metallurg Novokuznetsk
- NHL draft: 248th overall, 1992; New York Islanders
- Playing career: 1991–2007

Andrei Vladimirovich Vasilyev (Russian: Андрей Владимирович Васильев; born March 30, 1972) is a Russian professional ice hockey left winger.

== Career ==
Vasilyev was drafted in the eleventh round, 248th overall, by the New York Islanders in the 1992 NHL entry draft. He played sixteen games in the National Hockey League, fifteen over three seasons with the Islanders and one with the Phoenix Coyotes in the 1998–99 season.

== Career statistics ==
=== Regular season and playoffs ===
			Regular season					Playoffs
Season	Team	League	GP	G	A	Pts	PIM	GP	G	A	Pts	PIM
1989–90	Stankostroitel Ryazan	USSR-3	4	2	0	2	4	—	—	—	—	—
1990–91	SKA MVO Tver	USSR-2	70	35	16	51	18	—	—	—	—	—
1991–92	CSKA Moscow	USSR	20	4	2	6	0	8	3	0	3	2
1991–92	CSKA Moscow-2	USSR-3	24	18	13	31	10	—	—	—	—	—
1992–93	Khimik Voskresensk	RUS	34	4	8	12	20	—	—	—	—	—
1993–94	CSKA Moscow	RUS	46	17	6	23	8	3	1	0	1	0
1993–94	Russian Penguins	IHL	13	10	6	16	4	—	—	—	—	—
1994–95	New York Islanders	NHL	2	0	0	0	2	—	—	—	—	—
1994–95	Denver Grizzlies	IHL	74	28	37	65	48	13	9	4	13	22
1995–96	New York Islanders	NHL	10	2	5	7	2	—	—	—	—	—
1995–96	Utah Grizzlies	IHL	43	26	20	46	34	22	12	4	16	18
1996–97	New York Islanders	NHL	3	0	0	0	2	—	—	—	—	—
1996–97	Utah Grizzlies	IHL	56	16	18	34	42	7	4	1	5	0
1997–98	Long Beach Ice Dogs	IHL	62	33	34	67	60	17	9	4	13	14
1998–99	Phoenix Coyotes	NHL	1	0	0	0	0	—	—	—	—	—
1998–99	Grand Rapids Griffins	IHL	59	21	27	48	24	—	—	—	—	—
1998–99	Las Vegas Thunder	IHL	15	3	6	9	6	—	—	—	—	—
1999–00	Frankfurt Lions	DEL	54	26	21	47	18	5	2	1	3	30
2000–01	Avangard Omsk	RSL	16	3	0	3	14	—	—	—	—	—
2000–01	Revier Löwen Oberhausen	DEL	33	13	10	23	8	2	0	0	0	2
2001–02	Berlin Capitals	DEL	46	15	19	34	35	—	—	—	—	—
2002–03	Linköping HC	SWE	19	5	2	7	6	—	—	—	—	—
2003–04	Idaho Steelheads	ECHL	44	13	20	33	34	18	7	7	14	16
2004–05	Idaho Steelheads	ECHL	13	4	9	13	2	3	1	1	2	0
2005–06	CSKA Moscow	RSL	29	4	5	9	22	5	1	1	2	0
2006–07	Metallurg Novokuznetsk	RSL	23	1	1	2	32	3	0	1	1	0
IHL totals			322	137	148	285	218	59	34	13	47	54
NHL totals			16	2	5	7	6	—	—	—	—	—
