= Mark Visheau =

Canadian ice hockey player

- Born: June 27, 1973 (age 52) Burlington, Ontario, Canada
- Height: 6 ft 6 in (198 cm)
- Weight: 223 lb (101 kg; 15 st 13 lb)
- Position: Defence
- Shot: Right
- Played for: Winnipeg Jets; Los Angeles Kings
- NHL draft: 84th overall, 1992; Winnipeg Jets
- Playing career: 1993–1999

Mark Andrew Visheau (born June 27, 1973) is a Canadian former professional hockey player who played briefly in the NHL with the Winnipeg Jets and the Los Angeles Kings between 1993 and 1999. He played defense and shot right-handed.

Visheau's imposing size (6'6, 235 lbs) made him a strong defenceman and a hot prospect. After playing with the London Knights of the OHL for two years Visheau was drafted by the Winnipeg Jets in the 4th round, 84th overall in the 1992 NHL entry draft. After being drafted Visheau returned to the Knights for one more year before joining the Moncton Hawks of the AHL for the 1993–94 season. Visheau also made his NHL debut that year, playing in one game with the Jets.

The next few years saw Visheau bounce around in the minors. He made stops with the Springfield Falcons, Minnesota Moose, Cape Breton Oilers, Quebec Rafales, and the Milwaukee Admirals among other teams. Visheau finally earned another shot in the NHL when he signed as a free agent with the Los Angeles Kings in 1997. For the 1998–99 season Visheau earned a spot on the Kings roster and played 28 games with the team. However, a urinary tract infection and surgical error in cutting his muscles during urinary tract surgery put an end to the season for Visheau. After missing the entire 1999–00 season, Visheau retired from hockey.

== Career statistics ==
=== Regular season and playoffs ===
			Regular season					Playoffs
Season	Team	League	GP	G	A	Pts	PIM	GP	G	A	Pts	PIM
1989–90	Burlington Cougars	COJHL	42	11	22	33	53	—	—	—	—	—
1990–91	London Knights	OHL	59	4	11	15	40	7	0	1	1	6
1991–92	London Knights	OHL	66	5	31	36	104	10	0	4	4	27
1992–93	London Knights	OHL	62	8	52	60	88	12	0	5	5	26
1993–94	Winnipeg Jets	NHL	1	0	0	0	0	—	—	—	—	—
1993–94	Moncton Hawks	AHL	48	4	5	9	58	—	—	—	—	—
1994–95	Springfield Falcons	AHL	35	0	4	4	94	—	—	—	—	—
1995–96	Cape Breton Oilers	AHL	8	0	0	0	30	—	—	—	—	—
1995–96	Minnesota Moose	IHL	10	0	0	0	25	—	—	—	—	—
1995–96	Wheeling Thunderbirds	ECHL	7	1	2	3	14	7	0	3	3	4
1996–97	Raleigh IceCaps	ECHL	15	1	5	6	61	—	—	—	—	—
1996–97	Quebec Rafales	IHL	64	3	10	13	173	9	1	1	2	11
1997–98	Milwaukee Admirals	IHL	72	4	12	16	227	—	—	—	—	—
1998–99	Los Angeles Kings	NHL	28	1	3	4	107	—	—	—	—	—
NHL totals			29	1	3	4	107	—	—	—	—	—
