= Ondřej Steiner =

Czech ice hockey player (born 1974)

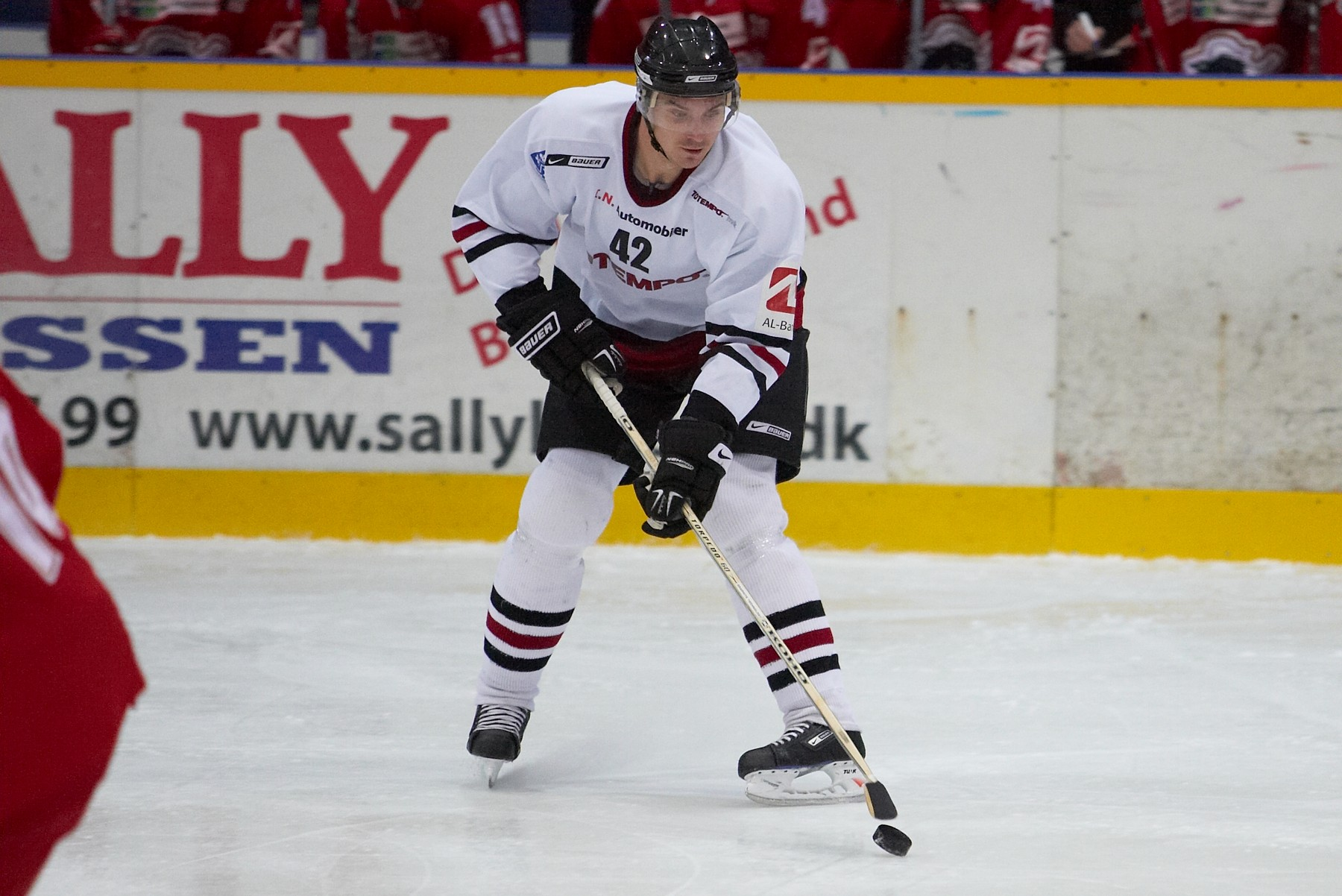
- Ondřej Steiner
- Born: February 11, 1974 (age 52) Plzeň, Czechoslovakia
- Height: 6 ft 1 in (185 cm)
- Weight: 198 lb (90 kg; 14 st 2 lb)
- Position: Centre
- Shot: Left
- Played for: HC Plzeň; HC Karlovy Vary; Ässät; HPK; HC Slavia Praha; HC Litvínov; HC Khimik Voskresensk; Stjernen Hockey; Lukko; Pelicans; Vsetínská hokejová Totempo HVIK
- NHL draft: 59th overall, 1992; Buffalo Sabres
- Playing career: 1991–2014

Ondřej Steiner (born February 11, 1974) is a Czech ice hockey centre.

Steiner played a total of 335 games in the Czech Extraliga for HC Plzeň, HC Karlovy Vary, HC Slavia Praha, HC Litvínov and Vsetínská hokejová. He also played in the SM-liiga for Ässät, HPK, Lukko and Pelicans as well as in the Russian Superleague for HC Khimik Voskresensk.

Steiner was drafted 59th overall by the Buffalo Sabres in the 1992 NHL entry draft but remained in the Czech Republic and never played in North America.
