= Glenn Mulvenna =

Canadian ice hockey player

- Born: February 18, 1967 (age 58); Calgary, Alberta, Canada
- Height: 5 ft 11 in (180 cm)
- Weight: 187 lb (85 kg; 13 st 5 lb)
- Position: Centre
- Shot: Left
- Played for: Pittsburgh Penguins; Philadelphia Flyers
- National team: Great Britain
- NHL draft: Undrafted
- Playing career: 1988–2001

Glenn Mulvenna (born February 18, 1967) is a Canadian former professional ice hockey centre who played 2 National Hockey League (NHL) games with the Pittsburgh Penguins and Philadelphia Flyers.

== Career statistics ==
			Regular Season					Playoffs
Season	Team	League	GP	G	A	Pts	PIM	GP	G	A	Pts	PIM
1984–85	New Westminster Bruins	WHL	66	16	15	31	34	11	2	3	5	2
1985–86	New Westminster Bruins	WHL	65	24	31	55	55	—	—	—	—	—
1986–87	New Westminster Bruins	WHL	53	24	44	68	43	—	—	—	—	—
1986–87	Kamloops Blazers	WHL	18	13	8	21	18	13	4	6	10	10
1987–88	Kamloops Blazers	WHL	38	21	38	59	35	15	6	11	17	14
1988–89	Knoxville Cherokees	ECHL	2	0	0	0	5	—	—	—	—	—
1988–89	Muskegon Lumberjacks	IHL	11	3	2	5	0	—	—	—	—	—
1988–89	Flint Spirits	IHL	32	9	14	23	12	—	—	—	—	—
1989–90	Fort Wayne Komets	IHL	6	2	5	7	2	—	—	—	—	—
1989–90	Muskegon Lumberjacks	IHL	52	14	21	35	17	11	2	5	7	0
1990–91	Muskegon Lumberjacks	IHL	48	9	27	36	25	5	1	1	2	0
1991–92	Muskegon Lumberjacks	IHL	70	15	27	42	24	14	5	6	11	11
1991–92	Pittsburgh Penguins	NHL	1	0	0	0	2	—	—	—	—	—
1992–93	Philadelphia Flyers	NHL	1	0	0	0	2	—	—	—	—	—
1992–93	Hershey Bears	AHL	35	5	17	22	8	—	—	—	—	—
1993–94	Kalamazoo Wings	IHL	55	13	9	22	18	4	0	0	0	0
1994–95	Peoria Rivermen	IHL	48	7	9	16	20	7	3	0	3	2
1995–96	Peoria Rivermen	IHL	42	2	5	7	16	5	0	0	0	0
1996–97	Sheffield Steelers	BISL	39	7	16	23	28	—	—	—	—	—
1997–98	VEU Feldkirch	Austria	3	0	0	0	8	—	—	—	—	—
1997–98	Newcastle Cobras	BISL	23	4	8	12	2	—	—	—	—	—
1997–98	Peoria Rivermen	ECHL	4	0	1	1	14	—	—	—	—	—
1998–99	Newcastle Riverkings	BISL	30	7	9	16	8	—	—	—	—	—
1999–00	Newcastle Riverkings	BISL	38	8	7	15	10	8	2	1	3	0
2000–01	Newcastle Jesters	BISL	18	1	0	1	4	—	—	—	—	—
NHL totals			2	0	0	0	4	—	—	—	—	—
