= Denis Chervyakov =

Russian ice hockey player

- Born: April 20, 1970 (age 56) Leningrad, Russian SFSR, Soviet Union
- Height: 6 ft 0 in (183 cm)
- Weight: 205 lb (93 kg; 14 st 9 lb)
- Position: Defence
- Shot: Left
- Played for: Boston Bruins; SKA Leningrad; Stars Rīga; Lukko; Ässät; Tappara; Västerås; Hannover Scorpions
- NHL draft: 256th overall, 1992; Boston Bruins
- Playing career: 1990–2001

Denis Vladimirovich Chervyakov (Russian: Денис Владимирович Червяков; born April 20, 1970, in Leningrad, Soviet Union (now Saint Petersburg, Russia)) is a retired Russian ice hockey defenceman who played two games for the Boston Bruins during the 1992–93 NHL season.

== Playing career ==
Chervyakov was drafted 256th overall by the Bruins in the 1992 NHL entry draft. After his two games, he spent the next three seasons with the Providence Bruins of the American Hockey League. In 1996, he signed with the New York Islanders as a free-agent, but spent the entire season with the AHL's Kentucky Thoroughblades and never played a game for the Islanders. Chervyakov moved to Finland's SM-liiga, suiting up for three teams in that season, Lukko, Tappara and Ässät. He then returned to North America the next year, playing for four teams. He began the year at the ECHL for the Baton Rouge Kingfish, after four games he moved to the Cincinnati Cyclones of the International Hockey League, he then played for the Orlando Solar Bears of the same league and rounded off the season in the AHL for the Portland Pirates. He split 1999-00 between two countries, Västerås HK of the Swedish Elitserien and the Hannover Scorpions of the Deutsche Eishockey Liga in Germany. He returned to the ECHL for the Augusta Lynx in 2000 which was his final season before retiring from hockey.

== Career statistics ==
=== Regular season and playoffs ===
			Regular season					Playoffs
Season	Team	League	GP	G	A	Pts	PIM	GP	G	A	Pts	PIM
1990–91	SKA Leningrad	USSR	28	2	1	3	40	—	—	—	—	—
1991–92	Stars Rīga	CIS	14	0	1	1	12	—	—	—	—	—
1992–93	Boston Bruins	NHL	2	0	0	0	2	—	—	—	—	—
1992–93	Atlanta Knights	IHL	1	0	0	0	0	—	—	—	—	—
1992–93	Providence Bruins	AHL	48	4	12	16	99	—	—	—	—	—
1993–94	Providence Bruins	AHL	58	2	16	18	128	—	—	—	—	—
1994–95	Providence Bruins	AHL	65	1	18	19	130	10	0	2	2	14
1995–96	Providence Bruins	AHL	64	3	7	10	58	4	1	0	1	21
1996–97	Kentucky Thoroughblades	AHL	52	2	11	13	78	—	—	—	—	—
1997–98	Lukko	FIN	24	0	0	0	57	—	—	—	—	—
1997–98	Ässät	FIN	2	0	0	0	2	—	—	—	—	—
1997–98	Tappara	FIN	14	0	2	2	14	4	0	0	0	0
1998–99	Baton Rouge Kingfish	ECHL	4	1	3	4	16	—	—	—	—	—
1998–99	Cincinnati Cyclones	IHL	32	3	3	6	62	—	—	—	—	—
1998–99	Portland Pirates	AHL	13	0	0	0	15	—	—	—	—	—
1998–99	Orlando Solar Bears	IHL	12	0	2	2	39	9	0	0	0	16
1999–00	Västerås	SEL	33	0	2	2	136	—	—	—	—	—
1999–00	Hannover Scorpions	DEL	14	0	2	2	22	—	—	—	—	—
2000–01	Augusta Lynx	ECHL	52	0	6	6	51	—	—	—	—	—
AHL totals			300	12	64	76	508	14	1	2	3	35
NHL totals			2	0	0	0	2	—	—	—	—	—
