= Denis Metlyuk =

Russian ice hockey player

- Born: January 30, 1972 (age 54) Tolyatti, Russia, U.S.S.R.
- Height: 6 ft 2 in (188 cm)
- Weight: 203 lb (92 kg; 14 st 7 lb)
- Position: Left wing
- Shot: Left
- Played for: HC Lada Togliatti; Ak Bars Kazan; Salavat Yulaev Ufa; HC Neftekhimik Nizhnekamsk; HC Khimik Voskresensk
- NHL draft: 31st overall, 1992; Philadelphia Flyers
- Playing career: 1991–2007

Denis Metlyuk (born January 30, 1972) is a former Russian professional ice hockey player who played in the Russian Superleague (RSL). Metlyuk was drafted in the second round of the 1992 NHL entry draft by the Philadelphia Flyers and played parts of two seasons in North America for the Hershey Bears, the Flyers' AHL affiliate at the time. He played 14 seasons in the RSL for HC Lada Togliatti, Ak Bars Kazan, Salavat Yulaev Ufa, HC Neftekhimik Nizhnekamsk, and HC Khimik Voskresensk. He is the brother of Filipp Metlyuk.
