= Marc Hussey =

Canadian ice hockey player

- Born: January 22, 1974 (age 52) Chatham, New Brunswick, Canada
- Height: 6 ft 4 in (193 cm)
- Weight: 225 lb (102 kg; 16 st 1 lb)
- Position: Defense
- Shot: Right
- Played for: St. John's Maple Leafs; Saint John Flames; Utah Grizzlies; Indianapolis Ice; Milwaukee Admirals; Fredericton Canadiens; Grand Rapids Griffins; London Knights; Krefeld Pinguine; Essen Mosquitoes; Nottingham Panthers; Alleghe HC
- National team: Canada
- NHL draft: 43rd overall, 1992; Pittsburgh Penguins
- Playing career: 1994–2002

Marc Hussey (born January 22, 1974) is a Canadian former professional ice hockey defenceman who was drafted by the Pittsburgh Penguins in the 1992 NHL entry draft 43rd overall.

== Career ==
Born in Chatham, New Brunswick, Hussey played in the AHL and IHL from 1994 until 1999 and continued his career in Europe until his retirement in 2004. After his retirement, he became a head coach for the Saint John Vito's AAA hockey team in 2008. He held the position for two seasons before joining the QMJHL's Saint John Sea Dogs as an assistant coach in 2009. While coaching, he was also a member of the Saint John Police Force.

== Career statistics ==
			Regular Season					Playoffs
Season	Team	League	GP	G	A	Pts	PIM	GP	G	A	Pts	PIM
1990–91	Moose Jaw Warriors	WHL	68	5	8	13	67	8	2	2	4	7
1991–92	Moose Jaw Warriors	WHL	72	7	27	34	203	4	1	1	2	0
1992–93	Moose Jaw Warriors	WHL	68	12	28	40	121	—	—	—	—	—
1993–94	Moose Jaw Warriors	WHL	17	4	5	9	33	—	—	—	—	—
1993–94	Tri-City Americans	WHL	16	3	6	9	26	—	—	—	—	—
1993–94	Medicine Hat Tigers	WHL	41	6	24	30	90	3	0	1	1	4
1994–95	St. John's Maple Leafs	AHL	12	0	1	1	20	—	—	—	—	—
1995–96	Saint John Flames	AHL	68	10	21	31	120	5	0	0	0	8
1996–97	Saint John Flames	AHL	46	6	18	24	62	—	—	—	—	—
1996–97	Utah Grizzlies	IHL	8	0	1	1	6	—	—	—	—	—
1996–97	Indianapolis Ice	IHL	14	0	2	2	17	4	0	1	1	10
1997–98	Indianapolis Ice	IHL	23	2	5	7	14	—	—	—	—	—
1997–98	Milwaukee Admirals	IHL	50	3	15	18	81	10	2	3	5	14
1998–99	Fredericton Canadiens	AHL	51	3	5	8	105	—	—	—	—	—
1998–99	Grand Rapids Griffins	IHL	13	0	6	6	14	—	—	—	—	—
1999–00	London Knights	BISL	39	6	13	19	58	7	3	6	9	2
2000–01	Krefeld Pinguine	DEL	58	6	18	24	120	—	—	—	—	—
2001–02	Essen Mosquitoes	DEL	58	1	12	13	71	—	—	—	—	—
2002–03	Nottingham Panthers	BISL	32	6	6	12	24	17	3	5	8	6
2003–04	Alleghe HC	Italy-A	29	10	17	27	38	3	1	1	2	6

== Awards and accomplishments ==
- 2011-12: QMJHL Champion (Saint John Sea Dogs, assistant coach)
- 2010-11: QMJHL Champion (Saint John Sea Dogs, assistant coach)
- 2010-11: Memorial Cup winner (Saint John Sea Dogs, assistant coach)
