= Travis Thiessen =

Canadian ice hockey defenseman

- Born: July 11, 1972 (age 53) North Battleford, Saskatchewan, Canada
- Height: 6 ft 3 in (191 cm)
- Weight: 207 lb (94 kg; 14 st 11 lb)
- Position: Defence
- Shot: Left
- Played for: Cleveland Lumberjacks; Indianapolis Ice; Saint John Flames; Peoria Rivermen; Manitoba Moose; Rosenheim Star Bulls; London Knights; SERC Wild Wings; Milano Vipers
- NHL draft: 67th overall, 1992; Pittsburgh Penguins
- Playing career: 1992–2003

Travis Thiessen (born July 11, 1972) is a Canadian retired professional ice hockey defenseman who played over 700 games across North America and Europe. He was selected 67th overall in the 1992 NHL entry draft by the Pittsburgh Penguins.

== Career statistics ==
			Regular season					Playoffs
Season	Team	League	GP	G	A	Pts	PIM	GP	G	A	Pts	PIM
1989–90	North Battleford North Stars	SJHL	6	0	1	1	2	5	0	1	1	4
1990–91	Moose Jaw Warriors	WHL	69	4	14	18	80	8	0	0	0	10
1991–92	Moose Jaw Warriors	WHL	72	9	50	59	112	4	0	2	2	8
1992–93	Cleveland Lumberjacks	IHL	64	3	7	10	69	4	0	0	0	16
1993–94	Cleveland Lumberjacks	IHL	74	2	13	15	75	—	—	—	—	—
1994–95	Flint Generals	CoHL	5	0	1	1	2	—	—	—	—	—
1994–95	Indianapolis Ice	IHL	41	2	3	5	36	—	—	—	—	—
1994–95	Saint John Flames	AHL	9	1	2	3	12	5	0	1	1	0
1995–96	Indianapolis Ice	IHL	4	0	1	1	8	—	—	—	—	—
1995–96	Peoria Rivermen	IHL	63	3	12	15	102	12	1	4	5	8
1996–97	Manitoba Moose	IHL	25	0	8	8	28	—	—	—	—	—
1996–97	Indianapolis Ice	IHL	8	0	3	3	8	—	—	—	—	—
1996–97	Peoria Rivermen	ECHL	14	1	6	7	12	10	0	6	6	12
1997–98	Star Bulls Rosenheim	DEL	39	2	12	14	56	—	—	—	—	—
1998–99	London Knights	BISL	28	2	11	13	28	4	0	1	1	4
1999–00	Colorado Gold Kings	WCHL	72	8	24	32	80	7	1	5	6	8
2000–01	SERC Wild Wings	DEL	8	0	0	0	14	—	—	—	—	—
2000–01	Milano Vipers	Italy	12	1	1	2	10	—	—	—	—	—
2000–01	Colorado Gold Kings	WCHL	39	2	19	21	53	8	0	1	1	0
2001–02	Colorado Gold Kings	WCHL	65	1	19	20	107	3	0	0	0	17
2002–03	Muskegon Fury	UHL	63	8	26	34	60	—	—	—	—	—
IHL totals			279	10	47	57	326	16	1	4	5	24
