= Tommy Söderström =

Swedish ice hockey player

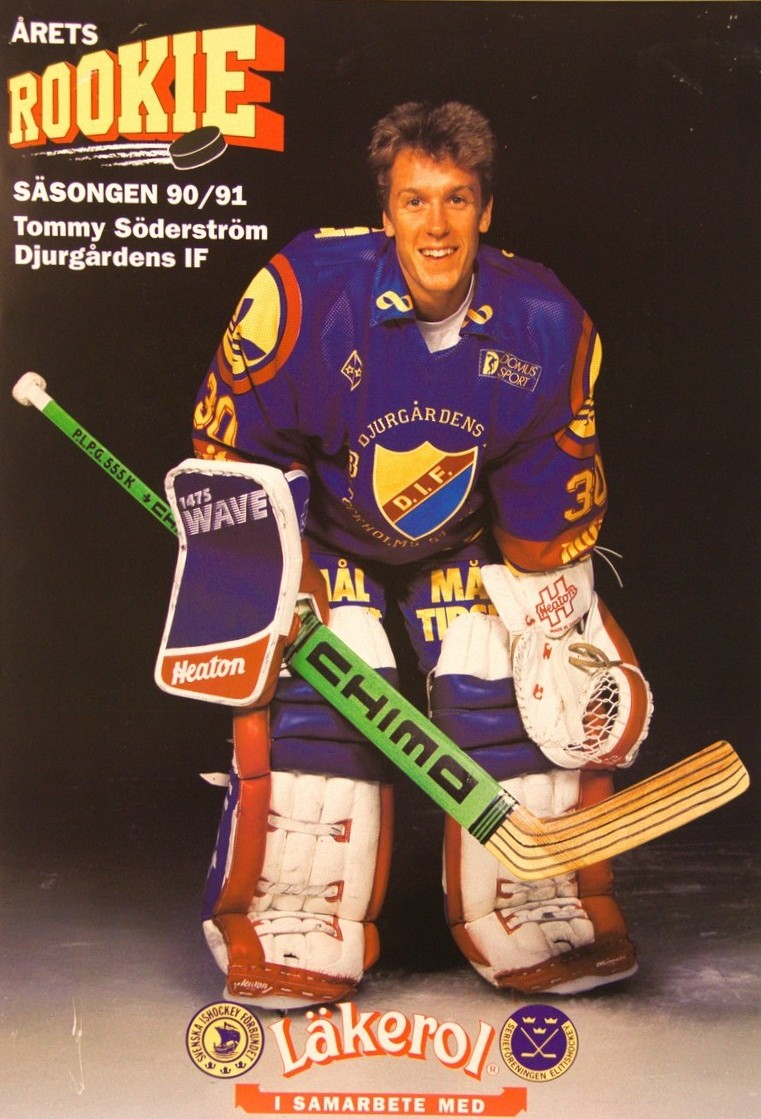
- Söderström as Rookie of the Year in 1990/91 season
- Born: July 17, 1969 (age 57) Stockholm, Sweden
- Height: 5 ft 10 in (178 cm)
- Weight: 161 lb (73 kg; 11 st 7 lb)
- Position: Goaltender
- Caught: Left
- Played for: Philadelphia Flyers; New York Islanders; Djurgårdens IF
- National team: Sweden
- NHL draft: 214th overall, 1990; Philadelphia Flyers
- Playing career: 1990–2000

Tommy Söderström (born July 17, 1969) is a Swedish former professional ice hockey goaltender. He played in the National Hockey League with the Philadelphia Flyers and New York Islanders from 1992 to 1996. The rest of his career, which lasted from 1989 to 2000, was mainly spent in the Swedish Elitserien. Internationally Söderström played for the Swedish national team in three World Championships, winning two gold medals and one silver, and the 1994 Winter Olympics.

== Career ==
Söderström played 156 games in the National Hockey League (NHL) with the Philadelphia Flyers and New York Islanders over parts of five seasons from 1992 to 1996. He also played for Djurgårdens IF, with which he won three Swedish Championships.

Tommy Söderström
Medal record

Representing Sweden

World Championships
Gold medal – first place	1991 Finland	
Gold medal – first place	1992 Czechoslovakia	
Silver medal – second place	1993 Germany	

== Honours ==
Djurgården

- Swedish Champion: 1988–89, 1989–90, 1999–2000

Sweden

- Ice Hockey World Championships: 1991, 1992

== Personal life ==
He participated in Mästarnas mästare in 2014.

== Career statistics ==
=== Regular season and playoffs ===
			Regular season									Playoffs
Season	Team	League	GP	W	L	T	MIN	GA	SO	GAA	SV%	GP	W	L	MIN	GA	SO	GAA	SV%
1986–87	Djurgårdens IF J20	SWE-Jr	9	—	—	—	540	11	3	1.22	—	—	—	—	—	—	—	—	—
1987–88	Djurgårdens IF J20	SWE-Jr	3	2	1	0	179	17	0	5.67	—	—	—	—	—	—	—	—	—
1988–89	Djurgårdens IF J20	SWE-Jr	7	—	—	—	420	22	0	3.14	—	—	—	—	—	—	—	—	—
1989–90	Djurgårdens IF	SWE	4	—	—	—	240	14	0	3.50	.873	—	—	—	—	—	—	—	—
1990–91	Djurgårdens IF	SWE	39	22	12	6	2340	104	3	2.67	.877	7	—	—	423	10	2	1.42	.932
1991–92	Djurgårdens IF	SWE	39	15	8	11	2340	109	4	2.79	.774	10	—	—	635	28	0	2.65	.885
1992–93	Philadelphia Flyers	NHL	44	20	17	6	2513	143	5	3.42	.892	—	—	—	—	—	—	—	—
1992–93	Hershey Bears	AHL	7	4	1	0	373	15	0	2.41	.921	—	—	—	—	—	—	—	—
1993–94	Philadelphia Flyers	NHL	34	6	18	4	1737	116	2	4.01	.864	—	—	—	—	—	—	—	—
1993–94	Hershey Bears	AHL	9	3	4	1	461	37	0	4.81	.863	—	—	—	—	—	—	—	—
1994–95	New York Islanders	NHL	26	8	12	3	1351	70	1	3.11	.902	—	—	—	—	—	—	—	—
1995–96	New York Islanders	NHL	51	11	22	6	2590	167	2	3.87	.878	—	—	—	—	—	—	—	—
1996–97	New York Islanders	NHL	1	0	0	0	1	0	0	0.00	1.000	—	—	—	—	—	—	—	—
1996–97	Rochester Americans	AHL	2	2	0	0	120	8	0	4.00	.860	—	—	—	—	—	—	—	—
1996–97	Utah Grizzlies	IHL	26	12	11	0	1463	76	0	3.12	.897	—	—	—	—	—	—	—	—
1997–98	Djurgårdens IF	SWE	46	—	—	—	2760	103	3	2.24	.916	15	—	—	936	34	1	2.18	.918
1998–99	Djurgårdens IF	SWE	48	—	—	—	2918	134	1	2.76	.897	4	—	—	240	11	0	2.75	.897
1999–00	Djurgårdens IF	SWE	21	—	—	—	1248	59	1	2.84	.882	—	—	—	—	—	—	—	—
NHL totals			156	43	69	19	8189	496	10	3.63	.884	—	—	—	—	—	—	—	—

=== International ===
Year	Team	Event	GP	W	L	T	MIN	GA	SO	GAA	SV%
1987	Sweden	EJC	5	—	—	—	300	11	3	1.22	—
1989	Sweden	WJC	3	—	—	—	180	7	—	2.33	—
1990	Sweden	WC	1	0	0	1	60	3	0	3.00	.885
1991	Sweden	CC	4	2	2	0	240	12	0	3.00	.900
1992	Sweden	OLY	5	3	1	1	298	13	0	2.62	.838
1992	Sweden	WC	5	4	1	0	299	7	2	1.40	.929
1993	Sweden	WC	7	4	3	0	386	20	0	3.10	.863
1996	Sweden	W-Cup	2	2	0	0	120	2	1	1.00	.952
Senior totals			24	15	7	2	1403	57	3	2.44	—
