= Chris Herperger =

Canadian ice hockey player

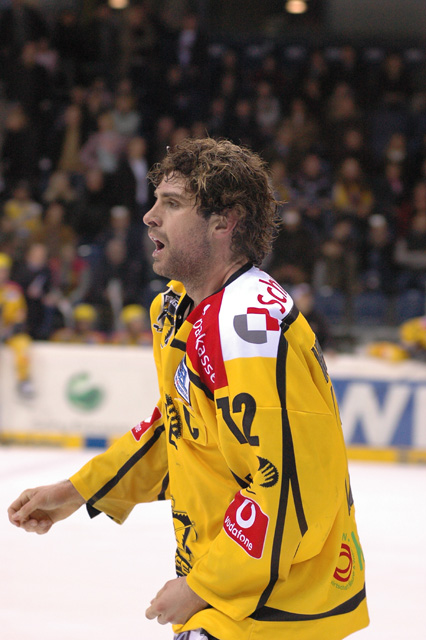
- Born: February 24, 1974 (age 52) Esterhazy, Saskatchewan, Canada
- Height: 6 ft 0 in (183 cm)
- Weight: 190 lb (86 kg; 13 st 8 lb)
- Position: Centre
- Shot: Left
- Played for: Chicago Blackhawks; Ottawa Senators; Atlanta Thrashers; Krefeld Pinguine; Kloten Flyers; Hannover Scorpions
- National team: Canada
- NHL draft: 223rd overall, 1992; Philadelphia Flyers
- Playing career: 1995–2013

Christopher Herperger (born February 24, 1974) is a Canadian former professional ice hockey player who played in the National Hockey League for the Chicago Blackhawks, Ottawa Senators, and Atlanta Thrashers between 1999 and 2003. Following that he spent several years playing in the Deutsche Eishockey Liga, the top league in Germany, retiring in 2013.

== Playing career ==
Herperger was drafted 223rd overall by the Philadelphia Flyers in the 1992 NHL entry draft. He played in the National Hockey League for the Chicago Blackhawks, Ottawa Senators and the Atlanta Thrashers. He played 169 regular season games in total, scoring 18 goals, making 25 assists, and collecting 75 penalty minutes.

Herperger then moved to Germany's Deutsche Eishockey Liga in 2003 and played for the Krefeld Pinguine for three seasons, and then to Switzerland to play for the Kloten Flyers of Nationalliga A. He returned to Germany after a single season, and signed with the Hannover Scorpions. Herperger played the final six years of his career with Hannover, before retiring at the end of the 2012–13 season, also the Scorpions last in the DEL.

== Career statistics ==
=== Regular season and playoffs ===
			Regular season					Playoffs
Season	Team	League	GP	G	A	Pts	PIM	GP	G	A	Pts	PIM
1990–91	Swift Current Legionnaires U18	SMAAAHL	—	—	—	—	—	—	—	—	—	—
1990–91	Swift Current Broncos	WHL	10	1	0	1	5	—	—	—	—	—
1991–92	Swift Current Broncos	WHL	72	14	19	33	44	8	0	1	1	9
1992–93	Swift Current Broncos	WHL	20	9	7	16	31	—	—	—	—	—
1992–93	Seattle Thunderbirds	WHL	46	20	11	31	30	5	1	1	2	6
1993–94	Seattle Thunderbirds	WHL	71	44	51	95	110	9	12	10	22	12
1994–95	Seattle Thunderbirds	WHL	59	49	52	101	106	4	4	0	4	6
1994–95	Hershey Bears	AHL	4	0	0	0	0	—	—	—	—	—
1995–96	Hershey Bears	AHL	46	8	12	20	36	—	—	—	—	—
1995–96	Baltimore Bandits	AHL	21	2	3	5	17	9	2	3	5	6
1996–97	Baltimore Bandits	AHL	67	19	22	41	88	3	0	0	0	0
1997–98	Canadian National Team	Intl	63	20	30	50	102	—	—	—	—	—
1998–99	Indianapolis Ice	IHL	79	19	29	48	81	7	0	4	4	4
1999–00	Chicago Blackhawks	NHL	9	0	0	0	5	—	—	—	—	—
1999–00	Cleveland Lumberjacks	IHL	73	22	26	48	122	9	3	3	6	8
2000–01	Chicago Blackhawks	NHL	61	10	15	25	20	—	—	—	—	—
2000–01	Norfolk Admirals	AHL	9	1	4	5	9	—	—	—	—	—
2001–02	Ottawa Senators	NHL	72	4	9	13	43	—	—	—	—	—
2002–03	Atlanta Thrashers	NHL	27	4	1	5	7	—	—	—	—	—
2002–03	Chicago Wolves	AHL	7	1	1	2	14	—	—	—	—	—
2002–03	Manitoba Moose	AHL	15	6	6	12	12	—	—	—	—	—
2003–04	Krefeld Pinguine	DEL	38	10	16	26	50	—	—	—	—	—
2004–05	Krefeld Pinguine	DEL	41	16	14	30	98	—	—	—	—	—
2005–06	Krefeld Pinguine	DEL	50	18	30	48	86	5	1	2	3	12
2006–07	Kloten Flyers	NLA	44	12	21	33	69	—	—	—	—	—
2007–08	Hannover Scorpions	DEL	36	16	21	37	61	—	—	—	—	—
2008–09	Hannover Scorpions	DEL	51	13	23	36	58	11	6	8	14	4
2009–10	Hannover Scorpions	DEL	39	12	18	30	52	11	7	5	12	4
2010–11	Hannover Scorpions	DEL	49	18	24	42	40	5	1	5	6	26
2011–12	Hannover Scorpions	DEL	49	16	23	39	28	—	—	—	—	—
2012–13	Hannover Scorpions	DEL	26	7	13	20	20	—	—	—	—	—
DEL totals			382	126	182	308	493	32	15	20	35	46
NHL totals			169	18	25	43	75	—	—	—	—	—

== Awards ==
- WHL West Second All-Star Team – 1995
