= 1992 NHL entry draft =

1992 North American ice hockey draft

General information
- Date: June 20, 1992
- Location: Montreal Forum; Montreal, Quebec, Canada

Overview
- 264 total selections in 12 rounds
- First selection: (Czechoslovakia) Roman Hamrlik (Tampa Bay Lightning)

The 1992 NHL entry draft was the 30th draft for the National Hockey League. It was held on June 20 at the Montreal Forum in Montreal. A total of 264 players were drafted.

The last active player in the NHL from this draft class was Sergei Gonchar, who retired after the 2014–15 season.

== Selections by round ==
Club teams are located in North America unless otherwise noted.

=== Round one ===
= NHL All-Star team ·	= NHL All-Star (Note: Players are identified as an All-Star if they were selected for the All-Star game at any time in their career.) ·	= NHL All-Star and NHL All-Star team ·

#	Player	Nationality	NHL team	College/junior/club team
1	Roman Hamrlik (D)	Czechoslovakia	Tampa Bay Lightning	ZPS Zlin (Czechoslovakia)
2	Alexei Yashin (C)	Russia	Ottawa Senators	Dynamo Moscow (Russia)
3	Mike Rathje (D)	Canada	San Jose Sharks	Medicine Hat Tigers (WHL)
4	Todd Warriner (LW)	Canada	Quebec Nordiques	Windsor Spitfires (OHL)
5	Darius Kasparaitis (D)	Lithuania	New York Islanders (from Toronto)^{1}	Dynamo Moscow (Russia)
6	Cory Stillman (LW)	Canada	Calgary Flames	Windsor Spitfires (OHL)
7	Ryan Sittler (LW)	Canada	Philadelphia Flyers	Nichols School (USHS–NY)
8	Brandon Convery (C)	Canada	Toronto Maple Leafs (from the Islanders)^{2}	Sudbury Wolves (OHL)
9	Robert Petrovicky (RW)	Czechoslovakia	Hartford Whalers	Dukla Trencin (Czechoslovakia)
10	Andrei Nazarov (LW)	Russia	San Jose Sharks (from Minnesota)^{3}	Dynamo Moscow (Russia)
11	David Cooper (D)	Canada	Buffalo Sabres	Medicine Hat Tigers (WHL)
12	Sergei Krivokrasov (RW)	Russia	Chicago Blackhawks (from Winnipeg)^{4}	CSKA Moscow (Russia)
13	Joe Hulbig (LW)	United States	Edmonton Oilers	Saint Sebastian's School (USHS–MA)
14	Sergei Gonchar (D)	Russia	Washington Capitals (from St. Louis)^{5}	Traktor Chelyabinsk (Russia)
15	Jason Bowen (D)	Canada	Philadelphia Flyers (from Los Angeles via Pittsburgh)^{6}	Tri-City Americans (WHL)
16	Dmitri Kvartalnov (LW)	Russia	Boston Bruins	San Diego Gulls (IHL)
17	Sergei Bautin (D)	Russia	Winnipeg Jets (from Chicago)^{7}	Dynamo Moscow (Russia)
18	Jason Smith (D)	Canada	New Jersey Devils	Regina Pats (WHL)
19	Martin Straka (C)	Czechoslovakia	Pittsburgh Penguins	Skoda Plzen (Czechoslovakia)
20	David Wilkie (D)	United States	Montreal Canadiens	Kamloops Blazers (WHL)
21	Libor Polasek (C)	Czechoslovakia	Vancouver Canucks	TJ Vitkovice (Czechoslovakia)
22	Curtis Bowen (LW)	Canada	Detroit Red Wings	Ottawa 67's (OHL)
23	Grant Marshall (RW)	Canada	Toronto Maple Leafs (from Washington)^{8}	Ottawa 67's (OHL)
24	Peter Ferraro (C)	United States	New York Rangers	Waterloo Black Hawks (USHL)
^{Reference:}

1. Toronto's first-round pick went to the Islanders as the result of a trade on June 20, 1992 that sent the Islanders' first and second-round picks in the 1992 entry draft to Toronto in exchange for this pick.
2. The Islanders' first-round pick went to Toronto as the result of a trade on June 20, 1992 that sent Toronto' first-round pick in the 1992 entry draft to the Islanders in exchange for the Islanders' second-round pick in the 1992 entry draft and this pick.
3. Minnesota's first-round pick went to San Jose as the result of a trade on May 31, 1991 that sent future considerations (San Jose made an agreement with Minnesota not to select Mike Craig in the 1991 NHL dispersal draft) to Minnesota in exchange for Minnesota's second-round pick in the 1991 entry draft and this pick.
4. Winnipeg's first-round pick went to Chicago as the result of a trade on June 20, 1992, that sent Chicago's first (# 17 overall) and second-round (# 27 overall) picks in the 1992 entry draft to Winnipeg in exchange for Winnipeg's second-round pick (# 12 overall) in the 1992 entry draft and this pick.
5. Washington acquired this pick with first-round picks in the 1991 entry draft, 1993 entry draft, 1994 entry draft and 1995 entry draft as compensation on July 16, 1990 after St. Louis signed free agent Scott Stevens.
6. Pittsburgh's first-round pick went to Philadelphia as the result of a trade on February 19, 1992 that sent Kjell Samuelsson, Rick Tocchet, Ken Wregget and Philadelphia's third-round pick in the 1993 entry draft to Pittsburgh in exchange for Brian Benning, Mark Recchi and this pick.
7. Pittsburgh previously acquired this pick as the result of a trade with Los Angeles on February 19, 1992 that sent Paul Coffey to Los Angeles in exchange for Brian Benning, Jeff Chychrun and this pick.
8. Chicago's first-round pick went to Winnipeg as the result of a trade on June 20, 1992, that sent Winnipeg's first (# 12 overall) and second-round (# 36 overall) picks in the 1992 entry draft to Chicago in exchange for Chicago's second-round pick (# 27 overall) in the 1992 entry draft and this pick.
9. Washington's first-round pick went to Toronto as the result of a trade on June 20, 1992 that sent Toronto's second and third-round picks in the 1992 entry draft with a fourth-round pick in the 1993 entry draft to Washington in exchange for Washington's fourth-round pick in the 1992 entry draft and this pick.

=== Round two ===
#	Player	Nationality	NHL team	College/junior/club team
25	Chad Penney (C)	Canada	Ottawa Senators	North Bay Centennials (OHL)
26	Drew Bannister (D)	Canada	Tampa Bay Lightning	Sault Ste. Marie Greyhounds (OHL)
27	Boris Mironov (D)	Russia	Winnipeg Jets (from San Jose via Chicago)^{1}	CSKA Moscow (Russia)
28	Paul Brousseau (RW)	Canada	Quebec Nordiques	Hull Olympiques (QMJHL)
29	Tuomas Gronman (D)	Finland	Quebec Nordiques (from Toronto)^{2}	Tacoma Rockets (WHL)
30	Chris O'Sullivan (D)	United States	Calgary Flames	Catholic Memorial School (USHS–MA)
31	Denis Metlyuk (C)	Russia	Philadelphia Flyers	Lada Togliatti (Russia)
32	Jim Carey (G)	United States	Washington Capitals (from the Islanders via Toronto)^{3}	Catholic Memorial School (USHS–MA)
33	Valeri Bure (RW)	Russia	Montreal Canadiens (from Hartford)^{4}	Spokane Chiefs (WHL)
34	Jarkko Varvio (RW)	Finland	Minnesota North Stars	HPK (Finland)
35	Jozef Cierny (LW)	Czechoslovakia	Buffalo Sabres	ZTK Zvolen (Czechoslovakia)
36	Jeff Shantz (C)	Canada	Chicago Blackhawks (from Winnipeg)^{5}	Regina Pats (WHL)
37	Martin Reichel (RW)	Czechoslovakia	Edmonton Oilers	EHC Freiburg (Germany)
38	Igor Korolev (C)	Russia	St. Louis Blues	Dynamo Moscow (Russia)
39	Justin Hocking (D)	Canada	Los Angeles Kings	Spokane Chiefs (WHL)
40	Michael Peca (C)	Canada	Vancouver Canucks (from Boston)^{6}	Ottawa 67's (OHL)
41	Sergei Klimovich (C)	Russia	Chicago Blackhawks	Dynamo Moscow (Russia)
42	Sergei Brylin (C)	Russia	New Jersey Devils	Dynamo Moscow (Russia)
43	Marc Hussey (D)	Canada	Pittsburgh Penguins	Moose Jaw Warriors (WHL)
44	Keli Corpse (C)	Canada	Montreal Canadiens	Kingston Frontenacs (OHL)
45	Mike Fountain (G)	Canada	Vancouver Canucks	Oshawa Generals (OHL)
46	Darren McCarty (LW)	Canada	Detroit Red Wings	Belleville Bulls (OHL)
47	Andrei Nikolishin (C)	Russia	Hartford Whalers (from Washington)^{7}	Dynamo Moscow (Russia)
48	Mattias Norstrom (D)	Sweden	New York Rangers	AIK IF (Sweden)
^{Reference:}

1. Chicago's second-round pick went to Winnipeg as the result of a trade on June 20, 1992, that sent Winnipeg's first (# 12 overall) and second-round (# 36 overall) picks in the 1992 entry draft to Chicago in exchange for Chicago's first-round pick (# 17 overall) in the 1992 entry draft and this pick.
2. Chicago previously acquired this pick as the result of a trade with San Jose on September 9, 1991 that sent Doug Wilson to San Jose in exchange for Kerry Toporowski and this pick.
3. Toronto's second-round pick went to Quebec as the result of a trade on November 17, 1990 that sent Aaron Broten, Lucien DeBlois and Michel Petit to Toronto in exchange for Scott Pearson, Toronto's second-round pick in the 1991 entry draft and this pick.
4. Toronto's second-round pick went to Washington as the result of a trade on June 20, 1992 that sent Washington's first and fourth-round picks in the 1992 entry draft to Toronto in exchange for Toronto's third-round pick in the 1992 entry draft, a fourth-round pick in the 1993 entry draft and this pick.
5. Toronto previously acquired this pick as the result of a trade with the Islanders on June 20, 1992 that sent Toronto's first-round pick in the 1992 entry draft to the Islanders in exchange for the Islanders' first-round pick in the 1992 entry draft and this pick.
6. Boston's second-round pick went to Vancouver as the result of a trade on January 16, 1991 that sent Petri Skriko to Boston in exchange for this pick.
7. Winnipeg's second-round pick went to Chicago as the result of a trade on June 20, 1992, that sent Chicago's first (# 17 overall) and second-round (# 27 overall) picks in the 1992 entry draft to Winnipeg in exchange for Winnipeg's first-round pick (# 12 overall) in the 1992 entry draft and this pick.
8. Hartford's second-round pick went to Montreal as the result of a trade on September 17, 1991 that sent Andrew Cassels to Hartford in exchange for this pick.
9. Washington's second-round pick went to Hartford as the result of a trade on September 8, 1991 that sent Sylvain Cote to Washington in exchange for this pick.

=== Round three ===
#	Player	Nationality	NHL team	College/junior/club team
49	Brent Gretzky (C)	Canada	Tampa Bay Lightning	Belleville Bulls (OHL)
50	Patrick Traverse (D)	Canada	Ottawa Senators	Shawinigan Cataractes (QMJHL)
51	Alexander Cherbayev (RW)	Russia	San Jose Sharks	Khimik Voskresensk (Russia)
52	Manny Fernandez (G)	Canada	Quebec Nordiques	Laval Titan (QMJHL)
53	Stefan Ustorf (LW)	Germany	Washington Capitals (from Toronto)^{1}	ESV Kaufbeuren (Germany)
54	Mathias Johansson (LW)	Sweden	Calgary Flames	Farjestad BK (Sweden)
55	Sergei Zholtok (C)	Latvia	Boston Bruins (from Philadelphia)^{2}	Riga Stars (Latvia)
56	Jarrett Deuling (LW)	Canada	New York Islanders	Kamloops Blazers (OHL)
57	Jan Vopat (D)	Czechoslovakia	Hartford Whalers	Chemopetrol Litvinov (Czechoslovakia)
58	Jeff Bes (C)	Canada	Minnesota North Stars	Guelph Storm (OHL)
59	Ondrej Steiner (C)	Czechoslovakia	Buffalo Sabres	Skoda Plzen (Czechoslovakia)
60	Jeremy Stevenson (LW)	United States	Winnipeg Jets	Cornwall Royals (OHL)
61	Simon Roy (D)	Canada	Edmonton Oilers	Shawinigan Cataractes (QMJHL)
62	Vitali Karamnov (LW)	Russia	St. Louis Blues	Dynamo Moscow (Russia)
63	Sandy Allan (G)	Canada	Los Angeles Kings	North Bay Centennials (OHL)
64	Vitali Prokhorov (LW)	Russia	St. Louis Blues	Spartak Moscow (Russia)
65	Kirk Maltby (W)	Canada	Edmonton Oilers (from Chicago)^{3}	Owen Sound Platers (OHL)
66	Cale Hulse (D)	Canada	New Jersey Devils	Portland Winter Hawks (WHL)
67	Travis Thiessen (D)	Canada	Pittsburgh Penguins	Moose Jaw Warriors (WHL)
68	Craig Rivet (D)	Canada	Montreal Canadiens	Kingston Frontenacs (OHL)
69	Jeff Connolly (C)	United States	Vancouver Canucks	Saint Sebastian's School (USHS–MA)
70	Sylvain Cloutier (C)	Canada	Detroit Red Wings	Guelph Storm (OHL)
71	Martin Gendron (RW)	Canada	Washington Capitals	Saint-Hyacinthe Laser (QMJHL)
72	Eric Cairns (LW)	Canada	New York Rangers	Detroit Junior Red Wings (OHL)
^{Reference:}

1. Toronto's third-round pick went to Washington as the result of a trade on June 20, 1992 that sent Washington's first and fourth-round picks in the 1992 entry draft to Toronto in exchange for Toronto's second-round pick in the 1992 entry draft, a fourth-round pick in the 1993 entry draft and this pick.
2. Philadelphia's third-round pick went to Boston as the result of a trade on January 2, 1992 that sent Garry Galley, Wes Walz and Boston's third-round pick in the 1993 entry draft to Philadelphia in exchange for Brian Dobbin, Gord Murphy, Philadelphia's fourth-round pick in the 1993 entry draft and this pick.
3. Chicago's third-round pick went to Edmonton as the result of a trade on October 2, 1991 that sent Steve Smith to Chicago in exchange for Dave Manson and this pick.

=== Round four ===
#	Player	Nationality	NHL team	College/junior/club team
73	Radek Hamr (D)	Czechoslovakia	Ottawa Senators	Sparta Prague (Czechoslovakia)
74	Aaron Gavey (F)	Canada	Tampa Bay Lightning	Sault Ste. Marie Greyhounds (OHL)
75	Jan Caloun (RW)	Czechoslovakia	San Jose Sharks	Chemopetrol Litvinov (Czechoslovakia)
76	Ian McIntyre (LW)	Canada	Quebec Nordiques	Beauport Harfangs (QMJHL)
77	Nikolai Borschevsky (RW)	Russia	Toronto Maple Leafs	Spartak Moscow (Russia)
78	Robert Svehla (D)	Czechoslovakia	Calgary Flames	Dukla Trencin (Czechoslovakia)
79	Kevin Smyth (LW)	Canada	Hartford Whalers (from Philadelphia)^{1}	Moose Jaw Warriors (WHL)
80	Dean Melanson (D)	Canada	Buffalo Sabres (from the Islanders)^{2}	Saint-Hyacinthe Laser (QMJHL)
81	Jason McBain (D)	United States	Hartford Whalers	Portland Winter Hawks (WHL)
82	Louis Bernard (D)	Canada	Montreal Canadiens (from Minnesota)^{3}	Drummondville Voltigeurs (QMJHL)
83	Matthew Barnaby (RW)	Canada	Buffalo Sabres	Beauport Harfangs (QMJHL)
84	Mark Visheau (D)	Canada	Winnipeg Jets	London Knights (OHL)
85	Chris Ferraro (C)	United States	New York Rangers (from Edmonton)^{4}	Waterloo Black Hawks (USHL)
86	Lee Leslie (LW)	Canada	St. Louis Blues	Prince Albert Raiders (WHL)
87	Kevin Brown (RW)	Canada	Los Angeles Kings	Belleville Bulls (OHL)
88	Jere Lehtinen (RW)	Finland	Minnesota North Stars (from Boston)^{5}	Kiekko-Espoo (Finland)
89	Andy MacIntyre (LW)	Canada	Chicago Blackhawks	Saskatoon Blades (WHL)
90	Vitaly Tomilin (LW)	Russia	New Jersey Devils	Krylya Sovetov (Russia)
91	Todd Klassen (D)	Canada	Pittsburgh Penguins	Tri-City Americans (WHL)
92	Marc Lamothe (G)	Canada	Montreal Canadiens	Kingston Frontenacs (OHL)
93	Brent Tully (D)	Canada	Vancouver Canucks	Peterborough Petes (OHL)
94	Scott McCabe (D)	United States	New Jersey Devils (from Detroit)^{6}	Detroit GPD Midgets (MWEHL)
95	Mark Raiter (D)	Canada	Toronto Maple Leafs (from Washington)^{7}	Saskatoon Blades (WHL)
96	Ralph Intranuovo (LW)	Canada	Edmonton Oilers (from the Rangers)^{8}	Sault Ste. Marie Greyhounds (OHL)
^{Reference:}

1. Philadelphia's fourth-round pick went to Hartford as the result of a trade on November 13, 1991 that sent Kevin Dineen to Philadelphia in exchange for Murray Craven and this pick.
2. The Islanders' fourth-round pick went to Buffalo as the result of a trade on October 25, 1991 that sent Benoit Hogue, Uwe Krupp, Dave McLlwain and Pierre Turgeon to the Islanders in exchange for Randy Hillier, Pat LaFontaine, Randy Wood and this pick.
3. Minnesota's fourth-round pick went to Montreal as the result of a trade on August 7, 1990 that sent Bobby Smith to Minnesota in exchange for this pick.
4. Edmonton's fourth-round pick went to the Rangers as the result of a trade on June 20, 1992, that sent the Rangers' fourth-round (# 96 overall) and eighth-round (# 190 overall) picks in the 1992 entry draft to the Edmonton in exchange for this pick.
5. Boston's fourth-round pick went to Minnesota as the result of a trade on August 21, 1990 that sent Ken Hodge Jr. to Boston in exchange for this pick.
6. Detroit's fourth-round pick went to New Jersey as the result of a trade on November 27, 1990 that sent Paul Ysebaert to Detroit in exchange for Lee Norwood and this pick.
7. Washington's fourth-round pick went to Toronto as the result of a trade on June 20, 1992 that sent Toronto' second and third-round picks in the 1992 entry draft with a fourth-round pick in the 1993 entry draft to Washington in exchange for Washington's first-round pick in the 1992 entry draft and this pick.
8. The Rangers' fourth-round pick went to Edmonton as the result of a trade on June 20, 1992, that sent Edmonton's fourth-round (# 85 overall) pick in the 1992 entry draft to the Rangers in exchange for the Rangers' eighth-round pick (# 190 overall) in the 1992 entry draft and this pick.

=== Round five ===
#	Player	Nationality	NHL team	College/junior/club team
97	Brantt Myhres (LW)	Canada	Tampa Bay Lightning	Lethbridge Hurricanes (WHL)
98	Daniel Guerard (RW)	Canada	Ottawa Senators	Victoriaville Tigres (QHL)
99	Marcus Ragnarsson (D)	Sweden	San Jose Sharks	Djurgardens IF (Sweden)
100	Charlie Wasley (D)	United States	Quebec Nordiques	St. Paul Vulcans (NAHL)
101	Janne Gronvall (D)	Finland	Toronto Maple Leafs	Lukko (Finland)
102	Sami Helenius (D)	Finland	Calgary Flames	Jokerit (Finland)
103	Vladislav Boulin (D)	Russia	Philadelphia Flyers	Dizelist Penza (Russia)
104	Tomas Klimt (C)	Czechoslovakia	New York Islanders	Skoda Plzen (Czechoslovakia)
105	Ryan Duthie (C)	Canada	New York Islanders (from Hartford)^{1}	Spokane Chiefs (WHL)
106	Chris DeRuiter (RW)	Canada	Toronto Maple Leafs (from Minnesota via Buffalo)^{2}	Kingston Voyageurs (OPJHL)
107	Markus Ketterer (G)	Finland	Buffalo Sabres	Jokerit (Finland)
108	Yuri Khmylev (LW)	Russia	Buffalo Sabres (from Winnipeg)^{3}	Krylya Sovetov (Russia)
109	Joaquin Gage (G)	Canada	Edmonton Oilers	Portland Winter Hawks (WHL)
110	Brian Loney (RW)	Canada	Vancouver Canucks (from St. Louis)^{4}	Ohio State University (CCHA)
111	Jeff Shevalier (LW)	Canada	Los Angeles Kings	North Bay Centennials (OHL)
112	Scott Bailey (G)	Canada	Boston Bruins	Spokane Chiefs (WHL)
113	Tim Hogan (D)	Canada	Chicago Blackhawks	University of Michigan (CCHA)
114	Ryan Black (LW)	Canada	New Jersey Devils	Peterborough Petes (OHL)
115	Philippe DeRouville (G)	Canada	Pittsburgh Penguins	Verdun College Francais (QMJHL)
116	Don Chase (C)	United States	Montreal Canadiens	Springfield Olympics (EJHL)
117	Adrian Aucoin (D)	Canada	Vancouver Canucks	Boston University (Hockey East)
118	Mike Sullivan (C)	United States	Detroit Red Wings	Reading High School (USHS–MA)
119	John Varga (LW)	United States	Washington Capitals	Tacoma Rockets (WHL)
120	Dmitri Starostenko (RW)	Belarus	New York Rangers	CSKA Moscow (Russia)
^{Reference:}

1. Hartford's fifth-round pick went to the Islanders as the result of a trade on October 30, 1990 that sent Marc Bergevin to Hartford in exchange for this pick.
2. Buffalo's fifth-round pick went to Toronto as the result of a trade on March 10, 1992 that sent Dave Hannan to Buffalo in exchange for this pick.
  Buffalo previously acquired this pick as the result of a trade with Minnesota on May 26, 1991 that sent that sent Darcy Wakaluk to Minnesota in exchange for Buffalo's eighth-round pick in the 1991 entry draft and this pick.
3. Winnipeg's fifth-round pick went to Buffalo as the result of a trade on October 11, 1991 that sent Mike Hartman, Dean Kennedy and Darrin Shannon to Winnipeg in exchange for Gord Donnelly, Dave McLlwain, cash and this pick.
4. St. Louis' fifth-round pick went to Vancouver as the result of a trade on March 5, 1991 that sent Garth Butcher and Dan Quinn to St. Louis in exchange for Geoff Courtnall, Robert Dirk, Sergio Momesso, Cliff Ronning and this pick.

=== Round six ===
#	Player	Nationality	NHL team	College/junior/club team
121	Al Sinclair (D)	Canada	Ottawa Senators	University of Michigan (CCHA)
122	Martin Tanguay (C)	Canada	Tampa Bay Lightning	Verdun College Francais (QMJHL)
123	Michal Sykora (D)	Czechoslovakia	San Jose Sharks	Tacoma Rockets (WHL)
124	Paxton Schulte (LW)	Canada	Quebec Nordiques	Spokane Chiefs (WHL)
125	Mikael Hakanson (C)	Sweden	Toronto Maple Leafs	Nacka HK (Sweden)
126	Ravil Yakubov (C)	Russia	Calgary Flames	Dynamo Moscow (Russia)
127	Roman Zolotov (D)	Russia	Philadelphia Flyers	Dynamo Moscow (Russia)
128	Derek Armstrong (C)	Canada	New York Islanders	Sudbury Wolves (OHL)
129	Joel Bouchard (D)	Canada	Calgary Flames (from Hartford)^{1}	Verdun College Francais (QMJHL)
130	Michael Johnson (D)	Canada	Minnesota North Stars	Ottawa 67's (OHL)
131	Paul Rushforth (C)	Canada	Buffalo Sabres	North Bay Centennials (OHL)
132	Alexander Alexeyev (D)	Ukraine	Winnipeg Jets	Sokil Kyiv (Ukraine)
133	Jiri Dopita (C)	Czechoslovakia	Boston Bruins (from Edmonton)^{2}	DS Olomouc (Czechoslovakia)
134	Bob Lachance (RW)	United States	St. Louis Blues	Springfield Olympics (EJHL)
135	Rem Murray (LW)	Canada	Los Angeles Kings	Michigan State University (CCHA)
136	Grigorijs Pantelejevs (LW)	Latvia	Boston Bruins	Riga Stars (Latvia)
137	Gerry Skrypec (D)	Canada	Chicago Blackhawks	Ottawa 67's (OHL)
138	Dan Trebil (D)	United States	New Jersey Devils	Bloomington Jefferson High School (USHS–MN)
139	Artem Kopot (D)	Russia	Pittsburgh Penguins	Traktor Chelyabinsk (Russia)
140	Martin Sychra (C)	Czechoslovakia	Montreal Canadiens	Zetor Brno (Czechoslovakia)
141	Jason Clark (C)	Canada	Vancouver Canucks	St. Thomas Stars (WOHL)
142	Jason MacDonald (RW)	Canada	Detroit Red Wings	Owen Sound Platers (OHL)
143	Jarrett Reid (C)	Canada	Hartford Whalers (from Washington)^{3}	Sault Ste. Marie Greyhounds (OHL)
144	David Dal Grande (D)	Canada	New York Rangers	Ottawa Jr. Senators (CCHL)
^{Reference:}

1. Hartford's sixth-round pick went to Calgary as the result of a trade on August 26, 1991 that sent Paul Fenton to Hartford in exchange for this pick.
2. Edmonton's sixth-round pick went to Boston as the result of a trade on September 11, 1991 that sent Norm Foster to Edmonton in exchange for this pick.
3. Washington's sixth-round pick went to Hartford as the result of a trade on October 1, 1990 that sent Dave Tippett to Washington in exchange for this pick.

=== Round seven ===
#	Player	Nationality	NHL team	College/junior/club team
145	Derek Wilkinson (G)	Canada	Tampa Bay Lightning	Detroit Whalers (OHL)
146	Jaroslav Miklenda (G)	Czechoslovakia	Ottawa Senators	DS Olomouc (Czechoslovakia)
147	Eric Bellerose (LW)	Canada	San Jose Sharks	Trois-Rivieres Draveurs (QMJHL)
148	Martin Lepage (D)	Canada	Quebec Nordiques	Hull Olympiques (QMJHL)
149	Patrik Augusta (RW)	Czechoslovakia	Toronto Maple Leafs	Dukla Jihlava (Czechoslovakia)
150	Pavel Rajnoha (D)	Czechoslovakia	Calgary Flames	ZPS Zlin (Czechoslovakia)
151	Kirk Daubenspeck (G)	United States	Philadelphia Flyers	Culver Military Academy (USHS–IN)
152	Vladimir Grachev (RW)	Russia	New York Islanders	Dynamo-2 Moscow (Russia)
153	Ken Belanger (LW)	Canada	Hartford Whalers	Ottawa 67's (OHL)
154	Kyle Peterson (C)	Canada	Minnesota North Stars	Thunder Bay Flyers (USHL)
155	Artur Oktyabrev (D)	Russia	Winnipeg Jets (from Buffalo)^{1}	CSKA Moscow (Russia)
156	Andrei Raisky (LW)	Kazakhstan	Winnipeg Jets	Torpedo Ust-Kamenogorsk (Kazakhstan)
157	Steve Gibson (LW)	Canada	Edmonton Oilers	Windsor Spitfires (OHL)
158	Ian Laperriere (RW)	Canada	St. Louis Blues	Drummondville Voltigeurs (QMJHL)
159	Steve O'Rourke (RW)	Canada	New York Islanders (from Los Angeles)^{2}	Tri-City Americans (WHL)
160	Lance Burns (C)	Canada	St. Louis Blues	Lethbridge Hurricanes (WHL)
161	Mike Prokopec (RW)	Canada	Chicago Blackhawks	Cornwall Royals (OHL)
162	Geordie Kinnear (D)	Canada	New Jersey Devils	Peterborough Petes (OHL)
163	Jan Alinc (LW)	Czechoslovakia	Pittsburgh Penguins	Chemopetrol Litvinov (Czechoslovakia)
164	Christian Proulx (D)	Canada	Montreal Canadiens	Saint-Jean Lynx (QMJHL)
165	Scott Hollis (RW)	Canada	Vancouver Canucks	Oshawa Generals (OHL)
166	Greg Scott (G)	Canada	Detroit Red Wings	Niagara Falls Thunder (OHL)
167	Mark Matier (D)	Canada	Washington Capitals	Sault Ste. Marie Greyhounds (OHL)
168	Matt Oates (LW)	United States	New York Rangers	Miami University (CCHA)
^{Reference:}

1. Buffalo's seventh-round pick went to Winnipeg as the result of a trade on June 22, 1991 that sent Tom Draper to Buffalo in exchange for this pick.
2. Los Angeles' seventh-round pick went to the Islanders as the result of a trade on February 18, 1992 that sent Steve Weeks to Los Angeles in exchange for this pick.

=== Round eight ===
#	Player	Nationality	NHL team	College/junior/club team
169	Jay Kenney (D)	United States	Ottawa Senators	Canterbury High School (USHS–CT)
170	Dennis Maxwell (C)	Canada	Tampa Bay Lightning	Niagara Falls Thunder (OHL)
171	Ryan Smith (D)	Canada	San Jose Sharks	Brandon Wheat Kings (WHL)
172	Mike Jickling (C)	Canada	Quebec Nordiques	Spokane Chiefs (WHL)
173	Ryan VandenBussche (RW)	Canada	Toronto Maple Leafs	Cornwall Royals (OHL)
174	Ryan Mulhern (C)	United States	Calgary Flames	Canterbury High School (USHS–CT)
175	Claude Jutras (RW)	Canada	Philadelphia Flyers	Hull Olympiques (QMJHL)
176	Jason Widmer (D)	Canada	New York Islanders	Lethbridge Hurricanes (WHL)
177	Konstantin Korotkov (C)	Russia	Hartford Whalers	Spartak Moscow (Russia)
178	Juha Lind (LW)	Finland	Minnesota North Stars	Jokerit (Finland)
179	Dean Tiltgen (C)	Canada	Buffalo Sabres	Tri-City Americans (WHL)
180	Igor Boldin (C)	Russia	St. Louis Blues (from Winnipeg)^{1}	Spartak Moscow (Russia)
181	Kyuin Shim (LW)	Canada	Edmonton Oilers	Sherwood Park Crusaders (AJHL)
182	Nick Naumenko (D)	United States	St. Louis Blues	Dubuque Fighting Saints (USHL)
183	Justin Krall (D)	United States	Detroit Red Wings (from Los Angeles)^{2}	Omaha Lancers (USHL)
184	Kurt Seher (D)	Canada	Boston Bruins	Seattle Thunderbirds (WHL)
185	Layne Roland (RW)	Canada	Chicago Blackhawks	Portland Winter Hawks (WHL)
186	Stephane Yelle (C)	Canada	New Jersey Devils	Oshawa Generals (OHL)
187	Fran Bussey (C)	United States	Pittsburgh Penguins	East High School (USHS–MN)
188	Michael Burman (D)	Canada	Montreal Canadiens	North Bay Centennials (OHL)
189	C. J. Denomme (G)	Canada	Detroit Red Wings (from Vancouver via San Jose)^{3}	Kitchener Rangers (OHL)
190	Colin Schmidt (C)	Canada	Edmonton Oilers (from Detroit via the Rangers)^{4}	Regina Pats Canadians (SMAAAHL)
191	Mike Mathers (LW)	Canada	Washington Capitals	Kamloops Blazers (WHL)
192	Mickey Elick (D)	Canada	New York Rangers	University of Wisconsin (WCHA)
^{Reference:}

1. Winnipeg's eighth-round pick went to St. Louis as the result of a trade on November 26, 1991 that sent Mario Marois to Winnipeg in exchange for this pick.
2. Los Angeles' eighth-round pick went to Detroit as the result of a trade on August 15, 1990 that sent Shawn McCosh to Los Angeles in exchange for this pick.
3. San Jose's eighth-round pick went to Detroit as the result of a trade on March 9, 1992 that sent Johan Garpenlov to San Jose in exchange for Bob McGill and this pick.
  San Jose previously acquired this pick as the result of a trade on March 9, 1991 that sent Ken Hammond to Vancouver in exchange for this pick.
4. The Rangers' eighth-round pick went to Edmonton as the result of a trade on June 20, 1992 that sent Edmonton's fourth-round (# 85 overall) pick in the 1992 entry draft to the Rangers in exchange for the Rangers' fourth-round pick (# 96 overall) in the 1992 entry draft and this pick.
  The Rangers previously acquired this pick as the result of a trade on December 26, 1991 that sent Greg Millen to Detroit in exchange for this pick.

=== Round nine ===
#	Player	Nationality	NHL team	College/junior/club team
193	Andrew Kemper (D)	Canada	Tampa Bay Lightning	Seattle Thunderbirds (WHL)
194	Claude Savoie (RW)	Canada	Ottawa Senators	Victoriaville Tigres (QMJHL)
195	Chris Burns (G)	Canada	San Jose Sharks	Thunder Bay Flyers (USHL)
196	Steve Passmore (G)	Canada	Quebec Nordiques	Kamloops Blazers (WHL)
197	Wayne Clarke (RW)	Canada	Toronto Maple Leafs	Rensselaer Polytechnic Institute (ECAC)
198	Brandon Carper (D)	United States	Calgary Flames	Bowling Green University (WCHA)
199	Jonas Hakansson (RW)	Sweden	Philadelphia Flyers	Malmo IF (Sweden)
200	Daniel Paradis (C)	Canada	New York Islanders	Chicoutimi Sagueneens (QMJHL)
201	Greg Zwakman (D)	United States	Hartford Whalers	Edina High School (USHS–MN)
202	Lars Edstrom (LW)	Sweden	Minnesota North Stars	Lulea HF (Sweden)
203	Todd Simon (C)	Canada	Buffalo Sabres	Niagara Falls Thunder (OHL)
204	Nikolai Khabibulin (G)	Russia	Winnipeg Jets	CSKA Moscow (Russia)
205	Marko Tuomainen (RW)	Finland	Edmonton Oilers	Clarkson University (ECAC)
206	Todd Harris (D)	Canada	St. Louis Blues	Tri-City Americans (WHL)
207	Magnus Wernblom (RW)	Sweden	Los Angeles Kings	Modo Hockey (Sweden)
208	Mattias Timander (D)	Sweden	Boston Bruins	Modo Hockey (Sweden)
209	David Hymovitz (LW)	United States	Chicago Blackhawks	Thayer Academy (USHS–MA)
210	Jeff Toms (LW)	Canada	New Jersey Devils	Sault Ste. Marie Greyhounds (OHL)
211	Brian Bonin (C)	United States	Pittsburgh Penguins	White Bear Lake Area High School (USHS–MN)
212	Earl Cronan (LW)	United States	Montreal Canadiens	St. Mark's School (USHS–MA)
213	Sonny Mignacca (G)	Canada	Vancouver Canucks	Medicine Hat Tigers (WHL)
214	Jeff Walker (D)	Canada	Detroit Red Wings	Peterborough Petes (OHL)
215	Brian Stagg (RW)	Canada	Washington Capitals	Kingston Frontenacs (OHL)
216	Daniel Brierley (D)	United States	New York Rangers	Choate Rosemary Hall (USHS–CT)
^{Reference:}

=== Round ten ===
#	Player	Nationality	NHL team	College/junior/club team
217	Jake Grimes (C)	Canada	Ottawa Senators	Belleville Bulls (OHL)
218	Marc Tardif (LW)	Canada	Tampa Bay Lightning	Shawinigan Cataractes (QMJHL)
219	Alex Kholomeyev (RW)	Russia	San Jose Sharks	Izhorets (Russia)
220	Anson Carter (RW)	Canada	Quebec Nordiques	Wexford Raiders (MetJHL)
221	Sergei Simonov (D)	Russia	Toronto Maple Leafs	Kristall Saratov (Russia)
222	Jonas Hoglund (RW)	Sweden	Calgary Flames	Farjestad BK
223	Chris Herperger (LW)	Canada	Philadelphia Flyers	Swift Current Broncos (WHL)
224	David Wainwright (D)	United States	New York Islanders	Thayer Academy (USHS–MA)
225	Steven Halko (D)	Canada	Hartford Whalers	Thornhill Islanders (OJHL)
226	Jeff Romfo (C)	United States	Minnesota North Stars	Blaine High School (USHS–MN)
227	Rick Kowalsky (RW)	Canada	Buffalo Sabres	Sault Ste. Marie Greyhounds (OHL)
228	Evgeny Garanin (C)	Russia	Winnipeg Jets	Khimik Voskresensk (Russia)
229	Teemu Numminen (C)	Finland	Winnipeg Jets (from Edmonton)^{1}	Stoneham High School (USHS–MA)
230	Yuri Gunko (D)	Ukraine	St. Louis Blues	Sokil Kyiv (Ukraine)
231	Ryan Pisiak (RW)	Canada	Los Angeles Kings	Prince Albert Raiders (WHL)
232	Chris Crombie (LW)	Canada	Boston Bruins	London Knights (OHL)
233	Richard Raymond (D)	Canada	Chicago Blackhawks	Cornwall Royals (OHL)
234	Heath Weenk (D)	Canada	New Jersey Devils	Regina Pats (WHL)
235	Brian Callahan (C)	United States	Pittsburgh Penguins	Belmont High School (USHS–MA)
236	Trent Cavicchi (G)	Canada	Montreal Canadiens	Dartmouth Midget All Stars (NSMMHL)
237	Mark Wotton (D)	Canada	Vancouver Canucks	Saskatoon Blades (WHL)
238	Dan McGillis (D)	Canada	Detroit Red Wings	Hawkesbury Hawks (CJHL)
239	Greg Callahan (D)	United States	Washington Capitals	Belmont Hill High School (USHS–MA)
240	Vladimir Vorobiev (RW)	Russia	New York Rangers	Severstal Cherepovets (Russia)
^{Reference:}

1. Edmonton's tenth-round pick went to Winnipeg as the result of a trade on June 12, 1991 that sent Winnipeg's fifth-round pick in the 1991 entry draft to Edmonton in exchange for John LeBlanc and this pick.

=== Round eleven ===
#	Player	Nationality	NHL team	College/junior/club team
241	Tom MacDonald (C)	Canada	Tampa Bay Lightning	Sault Ste. Marie Greyhounds (OHL)
242	Tomas Jelinek (RW)	Czechoslovakia	Ottawa Senators	HPK (Finland)
243	Viktors Ignatjevs (D)	Latvia	San Jose Sharks	HK Riga (Latvia)
244	Aaron Ellis (G)	United States	Quebec Nordiques	Culver Military Academy (USHS–IN)
245	Nathan Dempsey (D)	Canada	Toronto Maple Leafs	Regina Pats (WHL)
246	Andrei Potaichuk (RW)	Russia	Calgary Flames	Krylya Sovetov (Russia)
247	Patrice Paquin (LW)	Canada	Philadelphia Flyers	Beauport Harfangs (QMJHL)
248	Andrei Vasilyev (LW)	Russia	New York Islanders	CSKA Moscow (Russia)
249	Joacim Esbjors (D)	Sweden	Hartford Whalers	Vastra Frolunda HC (Sweden)
250	Jeff Moen (G)	United States	Minnesota North Stars	Roseville Area High School (USHS–MN)
251	Chris Clancy (LW)	Canada	Buffalo Sabres	Cornwall Royals (OHL)
252	Andrei Karpovtsev (RW)	Russia	Winnipeg Jets	Dynamo Moscow (Russia)
253	Brian Rasmussen (LW)	Canada	Edmonton Oilers	Saint Louis Park High School (USHS–MN)
254	Ivan Vologjaninov (LW)	Ukraine	Winnipeg Jets (from St. Louis)^{1}	Sokil Kyiv (Ukraine)
255	Jukka Tiilikainen (LW)	Finland	Los Angeles Kings	Kiekko-Espoo (Finland)
256	Denis Chervyakov (D)	Russia	Boston Bruins	HK Riga (Latvia)
257	Yevgeni Pavlov (RW)	Russia	Boston Bruins (from Chicago)^{1}	SKA Leningrad (Russia)
258	Vladislav Yakovenko (LW)	Russia	New Jersey Devils	Argus Moscow (Russia)
259	Wade Salzman (G)	United States	St. Louis Blues (from Pittsburgh)^{2}	East High School (USHS-MN)
260	Hiroyuki Miura (D)	Japan	Montreal Canadiens	Seibu Tetsudo Tokyo (JIHL)
261	Aaron Boh (D)	Canada	Vancouver Canucks	Spokane Chiefs (WHL)
262	Ryan Bach (G)	Canada	Detroit Red Wings	Notre Dame Hounds (SJHL)
263	B. J. MacPherson (LW)	Canada	Washington Capitals	Oshawa Generals (OHL)
264	Petter Ronnquist (G)	Sweden	Ottawa Senators (from the Rangers)^{3}	Nacka HK (Sweden)
^{Reference:}

1. St. Louis' eleventh-round pick went to Winnipeg as the result of a trade on June 20, 1992 that sent Winnipeg's eleventh-round pick in the 1993 entry draft to St. Louis in exchange for this pick.
2. Chicago's eleventh-round pick went to Boston as the result of a trade on January 8, 1992 that sent Steve Bancroft and Boston's eleventh-round pick in the 1993 entry draft to Chicago in exchange for this pick.
3. Pittsburgh's eleventh-round pick went to St. Louis as the result of a trade on October 2, 1990 that sent Gordie Roberts to Pittsburgh in exchange for this pick.
4. The Rangers' eleventh-round pick went to Ottawa as the result of a trade on June 20, 1992 that sent Ottawa's eleventh-round pick in the 1993 entry draft to the Rangers in exchange for this pick.

== Draftees based on nationality ==
Rank	Country	Number
	North America	174
1	Canada	138
3	United States	36
	Europe	88
2	Russia	38
4	Czechoslovakia	20
5	Sweden	11
6	Finland	10
7	Latvia	3
7	Ukraine	3
9	Belarus	1
9	Germany	1
9	Lithuania	1
	Asia	2
9	Japan	1
9	Kazakhstan	1

== See also ==
- 1992 NHL expansion draft
- 1992 NHL supplemental draft
- 1992–93 NHL season
- List of NHL players
