= Roman Zolotov =

Russian ice hockey player

- Born: February 13, 1974 (age 52) Moscow, Russian SFSR, Soviet Union
- Height: 6 ft 1 in (185 cm)
- Weight: 183 lb (83 kg; 13 st 1 lb)
- Position: Defense
- Shot: Left
- Played for: HC Dynamo Moscow; HC CSKA Moscow; Khimik Voskresensk
- NHL draft: 127th overall, 1992; Philadelphia Flyers
- Playing career: 1992–2004

Roman Vyacheslavovich Zolotov (Russian: Роман Вячеславович Золотов; born February 13, 1974) is a former Russian professional ice hockey player who played in the Russian Superleague (RSL). Zolotov was drafted in the sixth round of the 1992 NHL entry draft by the Philadelphia Flyers, but he never played professionally in North America. He played 11 seasons in the RSL for HC Dynamo Moscow, HC CSKA Moscow, and Khimik Voskresensk.
