= Gord Murphy =

Canadian ice hockey player

- Born: February 23, 1967 (age 59) Willowdale, Ontario, Canada
- Height: 6 ft 2 in (188 cm)
- Weight: 195 lb (88 kg; 13 st 13 lb)
- Position: Defence
- Shot: Right
- Played for: Philadelphia Flyers; Boston Bruins; Florida Panthers; Atlanta Thrashers
- National team: Canada
- NHL draft: 189th overall, 1985; Philadelphia Flyers
- Playing career: 1987–2002

Gordon J. Murphy (born February 23, 1967) is a Canadian former professional ice hockey defenceman who played 14 seasons in the National Hockey League (NHL) for the Philadelphia Flyers, Boston Bruins, Florida Panthers and Atlanta Thrashers. He is currently an assistant coach for the New York Rangers.

== Playing career ==
He was drafted by the Philadelphia Flyers in the ninth round, 189th overall, of the 1985 NHL entry draft. After playing three seasons in the Ontario Hockey League with the Oshawa Generals, Murphy made his professional debut with the Flyers' AHL affiliate, the Hershey Bears, in the 1987–88 season. In 1988–89, he joined the Flyers. After three-plus seasons in Philadelphia Murphy was traded, along with Brian Dobbin and a 1992 third-round draft choice, to the Boston Bruins for Garry Galley and Wes Walz in January of 1992.

Murphy was selected by the Florida Panthers in the 1993 NHL Expansion Draft, and he played there for six seasons. The Panthers traded him to another expansion team, the Atlanta Thrashers, as part of a deal made in the 1999 NHL Expansion Draft in which the Panthers acquired goaltender Trevor Kidd. Murphy spent two seasons in Atlanta before joining the Bruins once again for the 2001–02 season. After one season in the Bruins organization, he officially retired on March 19, 2002.

In his NHL career, Murphy played in 863 games. He scored 85 goals and added 238 assists. He also played in 53 Stanley Cup playoff games, scoring three goals and recording 16 assists. He was a member of the 1996 Florida Panthers, who won the Eastern Conference before losing in the Stanley Cup Finals.

== Coaching career ==
He worked as an assistant coach with the Columbus Blue Jackets from the 2002–03 NHL season until he was fired as a part of an overall coaching change on June 16, 2010. After working for Florida Panthers as an assistant coach, Murphy was fired on November 8, 2013 along with head coach Kevin Dineen and assistant coach Craig Ramsay. He was hired as an assistant coach by the Flyers on June 18, 2014. He was fired on November 28, 2018. On August 2, 2019, the New York Rangers announced the hiring of Murphy as an associate head coach with the Hartford WolfPack, the Rangers AHL affiliate.

== Personal life ==
Murphy and his wife Nicole have two sons, Tyler and Connor and one daughter, Lexi. His son, Connor Murphy, was drafted 20th overall in the 2011 NHL entry draft by the Phoenix Coyotes and is a defenceman for the Edmonton Oilers.

== Awards ==
- Barry Ashbee Trophy (Philadelphia Flyers top defenceman): 1989–90 season

== Career statistics ==
=== Regular season and playoffs ===
			Regular season					Playoffs
Season	Team	League	GP	G	A	Pts	PIM	GP	G	A	Pts	PIM
1983–84	Don Mills Flyers	MTHL	65	24	42	66	130	—	—	—	—	—
1984–85	Oshawa Generals	OHL	59	3	12	15	25	—	—	—	—	—
1985–86	Oshawa Generals	OHL	64	7	15	22	56	6	1	1	2	6
1986–87	Oshawa Generals	OHL	56	7	30	37	95	24	6	16	22	22
1986–87	Oshawa Generals	MC	—	—	—	—	—	3	0	3	3	9
1987–88	Hershey Bears	AHL	62	8	20	28	44	12	0	8	8	12
1988–89	Philadelphia Flyers	NHL	75	4	31	35	68	19	2	7	9	13
1989–90	Philadelphia Flyers	NHL	75	14	27	41	95	—	—	—	—	—
1990–91	Philadelphia Flyers	NHL	80	11	31	42	58	—	—	—	—	—
1991–92	Philadelphia Flyers	NHL	31	2	8	10	33	—	—	—	—	—
1991–92	Boston Bruins	NHL	42	3	6	9	51	15	1	0	1	12
1992–93	Boston Bruins	NHL	49	5	12	17	62	—	—	—	—	—
1992–93	Providence Bruins	AHL	2	1	3	4	2	—	—	—	—	—
1993–94	Florida Panthers	NHL	84	14	29	43	71	—	—	—	—	—
1994–95	Florida Panthers	NHL	46	6	16	22	24	—	—	—	—	—
1995–96	Florida Panthers	NHL	70	8	22	30	30	14	0	4	4	6
1996–97	Florida Panthers	NHL	80	8	15	23	51	5	0	5	5	4
1997–98	Florida Panthers	NHL	79	6	11	17	46	—	—	—	—	—
1998–99	Florida Panthers	NHL	51	0	7	7	16	—	—	—	—	—
1999–2000	Atlanta Thrashers	NHL	58	1	10	11	38	—	—	—	—	—
2000–01	Atlanta Thrashers	NHL	27	3	11	14	12	—	—	—	—	—
2001–02	Boston Bruins	NHL	15	0	2	2	13	—	—	—	—	—
2001–02	Providence Bruins	AHL	8	0	3	3	6	—	—	—	—	—
NHL totals			862	85	238	323	668	53	3	16	19	35

=== International ===
Year	Team	Event	Result	GP	G	A	Pts	PIM
1998	Canada	WC	6th	6	1	0	1	2
Senior totals				6	1	0	1	2

Awards and achievements
Preceded by Kjell Samuelsson	Barry Ashbee Trophy winner 1989–90	Succeeded by Kjell Samuelsson
