= Jonas Håkansson =

Swedish ice hockey player (born 1974)

- Born: January 4, 1974 (age 52) Malmö, Sweden
- Height: 6 ft 1 in (185 cm)
- Weight: 205 lb (93 kg; 14 st 9 lb)
- Position: Right wing
- Shot: Right
- Played for: Malmö Redhawks
- NHL draft: 199th overall, 1992; Philadelphia Flyers
- Playing career: 1990–2009

Jonas Håkansson (born January 4, 1974) is a former Swedish professional ice hockey player who played in the Swedish Hockey League (SHL). Håkansson was drafted in the ninth round of the 1992 NHL entry draft by the Philadelphia Flyers, but he never played professionally in North America. He spent his entire professional career in Sweden, playing parts of two seasons in the SHL with the Malmö Redhawks.
