= Kevin Dineen =

Canadian ice hockey player and coach

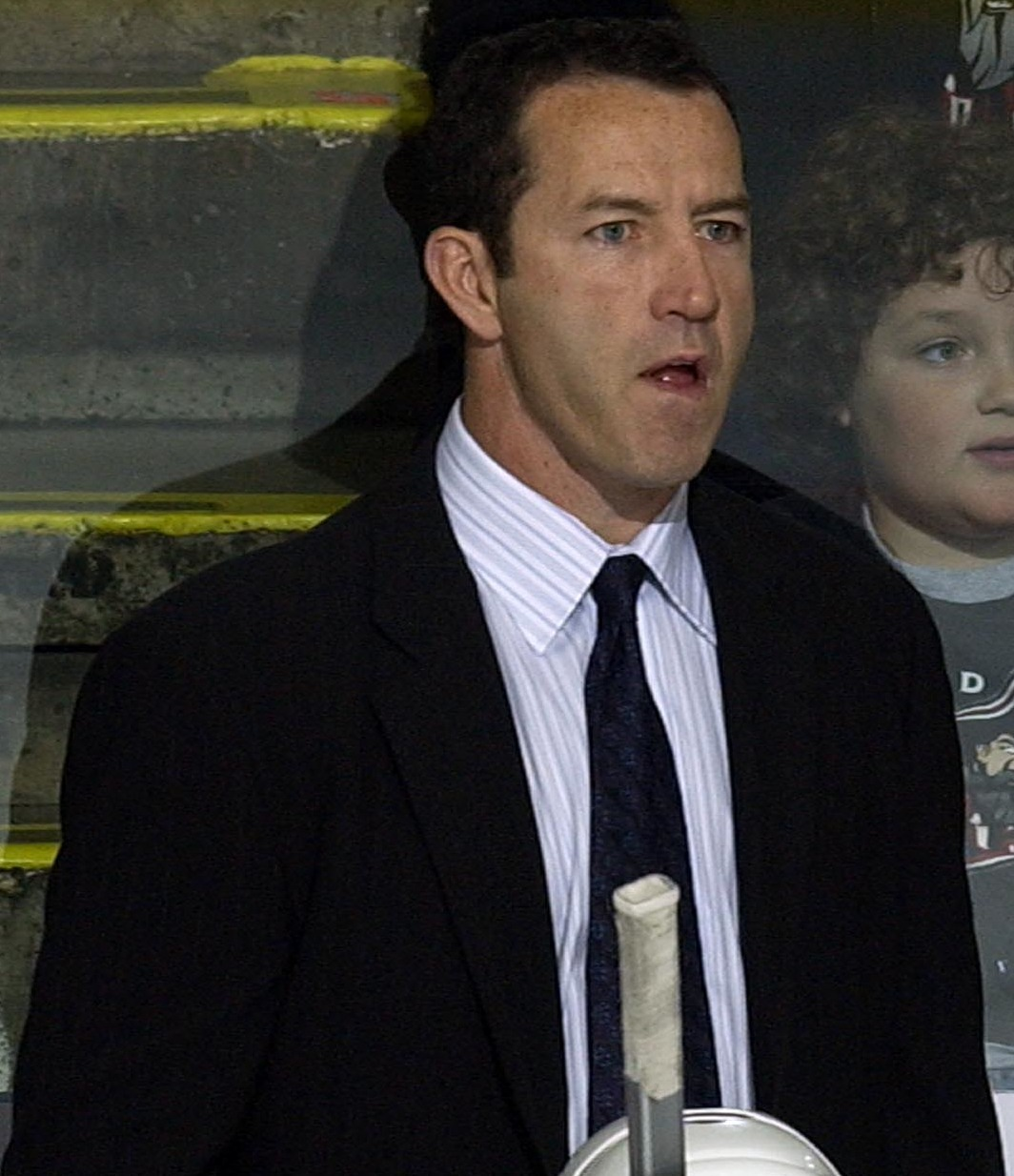
- Dineen in 2006
- Born: October 28, 1963 (age 63) Quebec City, Quebec, Canada
- Height: 5 ft 11 in (180 cm)
- Weight: 190 lb (86 kg; 13 st 8 lb)
- Position: Right wing
- Shot: Right
- Played for: Hartford Whalers; Philadelphia Flyers; Carolina Hurricanes; Ottawa Senators; Columbus Blue Jackets
- Coached for: Florida Panthers (Head Coach); Portland Pirates (Head Coach); San Diego Gulls (Head Coach); Chicago Blackhawks (Assistant)
- National team: Canada
- NHL draft: 56th overall, 1982; Hartford Whalers
- Playing career: 1984–2002
- Coaching career: 2005–Present

Kevin William Dineen (born October 28, 1963) is a Canadian professional ice hockey coach and former player. From 2021 to 2024, Dineen was the head coach of the Utica Comets in the American Hockey League (AHL). Dineen previously served as the head coach for the Florida Panthers and assistant coach of the Chicago Blackhawks. He was born in Quebec City, Quebec. He currently has pancreatic cancer.

== Playing career ==
=== St. Michael's Buzzers (1980–1981) ===
As a seventeen-year-old, Dineen played with the St. Michael's Buzzers in Junior "B" hockey, where in 40 games he scored 15 goals and 43 points, while getting 167 penalty minutes in 1980–81.

=== University of Denver (1981–1983) ===
Dineen began his college career in 1981–82, with the University of Denver Pioneers of the Western Collegiate Hockey Association. In his first season with the Pioneers, Dineen had 10 goals and 20 points in 27 games. He was then selected in the third round of the 1982 NHL entry draft by the Hartford Whalers.

Dineen returned to the Pioneers for the 1982–83 season, where he was named captain as a sophomore and saw his numbers increase to 16 goals and 29 points in 36 games. Dineen played both forward and defense for the Pioneers during his two-year college career.

=== Canadian National Team (1983–1984) ===
Dineen spent the 1983–84 hockey season with the Canadian national hockey team, where he scored five goals and 16 points in 52 games. Dineen also played in the 1984 Winter Olympics, however, he was held pointless in seven games for Team Canada.

=== Hartford Whalers (1984–1991) ===
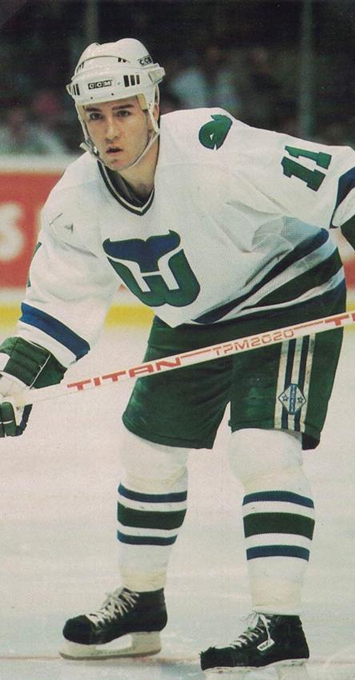
1985 photo of Kevin Dineen for Harford Whalers

Dineen began the 1984–85 season with Binghamton Whalers of the American Hockey League (AHL), where he played in 25 games, scoring 15 goals and 23 points. He was then promoted to Hartford, as he made his NHL debut on December 3, 1984, against the Montreal Canadiens. He finished the season in the NHL, scoring 25 goals and 41 points in 57 games with Hartford, however, the team failed to make the playoffs.

He stayed in the NHL for good in 1985–86, where Dineen improved his numbers, scoring 33 goals and 68 points in 57 games with Hartford, finishing fourth in team scoring. In ten playoff games, Dineen had a team high six goals and 13 points, as Hartford upset the Quebec Nordiques in the first round before losing to the Canadiens in the Adams Division finals.

Dineen had a breakout season with the Whalers in 1986–87, scoring a team high 40 goals, and finishing second on the team with 79 points, helping Hartford finish in first place in the Adams Division. In the playoffs, Dineen had two goals and three points, as the Whalers were upset in the first round by the Nordiques.

His production slipped in the 1987–88 season, as Dineen had 25 goals and 50 points in 74 games, however, in six playoff games, he had four goals and eight points to lead the club.

Dineen had a career season in 1988–89, scoring a career high 45 goals and 89 points to lead the club in scoring, however, in four playoff games, Dineen had only one goal as the Whalers were swept in the first round. In 1988 and 1989, Dineen went to the NHL All-Star Game.

In 1989–90, Dineen saw his numbers slip to 25 goals and 66 points, however, he missed 13 games due to injuries during the season. In six playoff games, Dineen had three goals and five points as the Whalers lost to their rivals, the Boston Bruins in the first round.

Dineen saw his production decrease again in 1990–91, scoring 17 goals and 47 points, which was his lowest point total since his rookie season in 1984–85. In six playoff games, he registered only one goal as the Whalers went out in the first round.

He began the 1991–92 season with the Whalers, where in 16 games, Dineen had four goals and six points. On November 13, 1991, the Whalers traded Dineen to the Philadelphia Flyers for Murray Craven and a fourth round draft pick in the 1992 NHL entry draft, where he would play for his father Bill Dineen, who was the Flyers head coach.

=== Philadelphia Flyers (1991–1995) ===
Dineen saw his production increase with the Flyers to finish the 1991–92 season, scoring 26 goals and 56 points in 64 games with the Flyers, however, the team failed to make the playoffs.

In his first full season with Philadelphia in 1992–93, Dineen scored 35 goals, his highest total since scoring 45 with the Whalers in 1988–89, while finishing with 63 points, to finish fourth in team scoring. Philadelphia missed the playoffs once again.

Dineen was named the Flyers captain for the 1993–94, however, he saw his production decrease, scoring 19 goals and 42 points, his lowest point total since his rookie season. Once again, the Flyers missed the playoffs. Dineen resigned captaincy in September 1994, in favor of Eric Lindros.

During the 1994–95 NHL lockout, Dineen played with the Houston Aeros of the IHL, where he had six goals and ten points in 17 games. When the NHL resumed play in January 1995, Dineen rejoined the Flyers. Dineen struggled all season long, scoring eight goals and 13 points in 40 games. However, the Flyers made the playoffs. In 15 playoff games, Dineen scored six goals and ten points, helping the Flyers to the Eastern Conference finals. After the season, Dineen finished as the runner-up for the Bill Masterton Memorial Trophy.

He started the 1995–96 season with the Flyers, where Dineen saw his numbers plummet to no goals and two points in 26 games. On December 28, 1995, the Flyers traded Dineen back to the Whalers for Hartford's seventh round pick in the 1997 NHL entry draft.

=== Hartford Whalers/Carolina Hurricanes (1995–1999) ===
In his return to the Whalers to finish the 1995–96 season, Dineen scored two goals and nine points in 20 games, as the team missed the playoffs.

Hartford named Dineen as their team captain prior to the 1996–97 season, and Dineen responded with 19 goals, his highest total since 1993–94, and 48 points, his best total since 1992–93. On April 13, 1997, Dineen scored the final goal in Whalers history, as Hartford defeated Tampa Bay Lightning 2–1. Following the game, Dineen took a microphone and gave a brief speech thanking the Whalers fans for following and helping the team. Hartford missed the playoffs, and during the 1997 off-season, the club relocated to North Carolina and became the Carolina Hurricanes.

Dineen remained the Hurricanes captain during the 1997–98 season, where he scored the first goal in Carolina's history. However, his production slipped to seven goals and 23 points in 54 games, as the Hurricanes failed to qualify for the playoffs.

In 1998–99, the Hurricanes named Keith Primeau as team captain, as Dineen would serve as an alternate captain. In 67 games, Dineen had eight goals and 18 points, helping the Hurricanes make the playoffs for the first time. In six playoff games, Dineen recorded no points as the Hurricanes fell in the first round to the Boston Bruins.

=== Ottawa Senators (1999–2000) ===
On September 1, 1999, Dineen signed as a free agent with the Ottawa Senators for the 1999–2000 season. In his one season in Ottawa, Dineen scored four goals and registered 12 points in 67 games; however, he was a healthy scratch and did not play in any playoff games for the Senators. At season's end, Ottawa left Dineen unprotected for the 2000 NHL Expansion Draft, where he was subsequently selected by the new Columbus Blue Jackets team.

=== Columbus Blue Jackets (2000–2002) ===
In his first season with the Columbus in 2000–01, Dineen had eight goals and 15 points in 66 games, as Columbus finished well out of a playoff position.

Dineen returned to the Blue Jackets for a second season in 2001–02, and saw similar results, scoring five goals and 13 points in 59 games, as the team once again missed the playoffs.

Dineen only appeared in four games during the 2002–03 season with Columbus, and on November 5, 2002, he retired from playing. In 1188 career games, Dineen recorded 355 goals and 760 points while registering 2229 penalty minutes.

On January 6, 2006, Dineen had his Hartford Whalers' number 11 honored by the AHL Hartford Wolf Pack alongside former Whalers' teammates Ron Francis and Ulf Samuelsson. The ceremony took place before the Portland Pirates, whom he was coaching at the time, played against the Wolf Pack in an AHL match.

== International play ==
Dineen participated with the Canadian national hockey team numerous times during his career. He spent the 1983–84 season with the club, scoring five goals and 16 points in 52 games, and appeared in seven games with Canada at the 1984 Winter Olympics held in Sarajevo, where he had no points in seven games.

In 1985, Dineen played with Canada at the 1985 World Ice Hockey Championships, scoring three goals and five points in ten games. He represented Canada once again at the 1987 World Ice Hockey Championships, scoring four goals and six points in nine games. At the 1989 World Ice Hockey Championships, Dineen scored three goals and ten points in ten games, while at the 1993 World Ice Hockey Championships, Dineen had a goal and three points in eight games.

He also represented the National Hockey League at Rendez-vous '87 in Quebec City. In the two-game series against the Soviet Union, Dineen had a goal.

== Coaching career ==
=== Portland Pirates (2005–2011) ===
In the summer of 2005, Dineen was named the head coach of the Portland Pirates, which was then the Anaheim Ducks AHL affiliate.

In the 2005–06 season, Dineen led the Pirates to a 53–19–5–3 record, earning 114 points, top in the Eastern Conference, and a 34-point increase over the previous season. On April 7, 2006, Dineen was named the winner of the Louis A. R. Pieri Memorial Award as the AHL's outstanding coach. In the playoffs, the Pirates defeated the Providence Bruins in the first round in six games, followed by another six game victory over the Hartford Wolf Pack. In the Eastern Conference finals, Portland lost to the Hershey Bears in seven games.

The 2006–07 season saw the Pirates slip to a 37–31–3–9 record, registering 86 points, which placed them in sixth place in the Atlantic Division, missing the playoffs.

In 2007–08, Portland rebounded to a 45–26–5–4 record, getting 99 points, and third place in the Atlantic Division, earning a playoff berth. In the post-season, the Pirates upset the Wolf Pack in five games, followed by another upset, as Portland defeated the division-winning Providence Bruins in six games, earning a trip to the Eastern Conference finals, where they faced the Wilkes-Barre/Scranton Penguins. The Penguins ended the Pirates season, defeating Portland in a seven-game series. After the season, Portland changed NHL affiliates, as the Buffalo Sabres took over the team, however, the team kept Dineen on as their head coach. The Ducks moved their affiliate and became the Iowa Chops.

Now coaching the Sabres affiliate in 2008–09, Dineen led Portland to a 39–31–3–7 record, recording 88 points, good for third place in the Atlantic Division. In the first round of the playoffs, the Providence Bruins defeated Portland in five games.

The Pirates increased their point total in the 2009–10 season, finishing with a 45–24–7–4 record, getting 101 points. Portland then faced the Manchester Monarchs in the first round, and was swept out of the playoffs.

In 2010–11, the Pirates saw their point total improve again, as they finished in first place in the Atlantic Division with a 47–24–7–2 record, earning 103 points. Portland faced off against the Connecticut Whale in the first round, winning the series in six games, however, the Pirates season came to an end in the second round, when the Binghamton Senators defeated the Pirates in six games.

On May 31, 2011, Dineen left the Pirates, as he signed to become the new head coach of the Florida Panthers of the NHL.

=== Florida Panthers (2011–2013) ===
In his first season as the head coach of the Panthers, Dineen led the team to its first Southeast Division Title in franchise history. This was the Panthers' first post-season appearance in 12 years. But his Panthers team lost in the first round of the 2012 Stanley Cup Playoffs to the New Jersey Devils in seven games. On November 8, 2013, the Panthers fired Dineen and his assistants, Gord Murphy and Craig Ramsay after a disappointing start to the 2013–14 season, Peter Horachek was named interim head coach.

=== Team Canada (2013–2014) ===
On Tuesday December 17, 2013, Kevin Dineen was named head coach of Team Canada's women's national ice hockey team. On February 20, 2014, he led the women's squad to a fourth consecutive Olympic gold medal in the 2014 Winter Olympics in Sochi, Russia.

On March 20, 2014, Dineen was named head coach of Canada's National Men's Under-18 Team for the 2014 IIHF World U18 Championships. The team finished third, winning the bronze medal.

=== Chicago Blackhawks (2014–2018) ===
On July 14, 2014, Dineen was named as an assistant coach of Chicago Blackhawks, joining the staff of Joel Quenneville, who had been his teammate for six seasons when they both played for the Hartford Whalers. As an assistant coach for the Blackhawks, Dineen won his first Stanley Cup on June 15, 2015. On November 6, 2018, Dineen was fired along with Quenneville and assistant coach Ulf Samuelsson.

=== San Diego Gulls (2019–2021) ===
On July 15, 2019, Dineen was named head coach of San Diego Gulls, the AHL affiliate of the Anaheim Ducks. He replaced Dallas Eakins, who became the Ducks' head coach. Dineen's contract was not renewed after he posted a 56–36–9 record over two seasons in charge of the Gulls. On July 9, 2021, the Ducks replaced Dineen with Joel Bouchard.

=== Utica Comets (2021–present) ===
On August 5, 2021, Dineen was hired as the head coach of the AHL's Utica Comets, the affiliate for New Jersey Devils. On November 19, 2021, the Comets broke the record for longest win streak to start a season in AHL history with thirteen consecutive wins.

== Personal life ==
Outside of the world of ice hockey, Dineen is a spokesperson for Crohn's & Colitis Foundation of America.

He is the son of late NHL player and coach Bill Dineen and Pat Dineen. He has four brothers: Gord, Peter, Shawn and Jerry, and one sister, Rose. Although born in Canada, Dineen spent much of his youth in the United States, while his father played and coached professionally.

Dineen and his wife, Annie, are the parents of four children, two daughters and two sons.

Dineen was diagnosed with pancreatic cancer in 2025.

== Career statistics ==
=== Regular season and playoffs ===
			Regular season					Playoffs
Season	Team	League	GP	G	A	Pts	PIM	GP	G	A	Pts	PIM
1980–81	St. Michael's Buzzers	MetJHL	40	15	28	43	167	—	—	—	—	—
1981–82	University of Denver	WCHA	26	10	10	20	70	—	—	—	—	—
1982–83	University of Denver	WCHA	36	16	13	29	108	—	—	—	—	—
1983–84	Canada	Intl	52	5	11	16	2	—	—	—	—	—
1984–85	Binghamton Whalers	AHL	25	15	8	23	41	—	—	—	—	—
1984–85	Hartford Whalers	NHL	57	25	16	41	120	—	—	—	—	—
1985–86	Hartford Whalers	NHL	57	33	35	68	124	10	6	7	13	8
1986–87	Hartford Whalers	NHL	78	40	39	79	110	6	2	1	3	31
1987–88	Hartford Whalers	NHL	74	25	25	50	217	6	4	4	8	8
1988–89	Hartford Whalers	NHL	79	45	44	89	167	4	1	0	1	10
1989–90	Hartford Whalers	NHL	67	25	41	66	164	6	3	2	5	18
1990–91	Hartford Whalers	NHL	61	17	30	47	104	6	1	0	1	16
1991–92	Hartford Whalers	NHL	16	4	2	6	23	—	—	—	—	—
1991–92	Philadelphia Flyers	NHL	64	26	30	56	130	—	—	—	—	—
1992–93	Philadelphia Flyers	NHL	83	35	28	63	201	—	—	—	—	—
1993–94	Philadelphia Flyers	NHL	71	19	23	42	113	—	—	—	—	—
1994–95	Philadelphia Flyers	NHL	40	8	5	13	39	15	6	4	10	18
1994–95	Houston Aeros	IHL	17	6	4	10	42	—	—	—	—	—
1995–96	Philadelphia Flyers	NHL	26	0	2	2	50	—	—	—	—	—
1995–96	Hartford Whalers	NHL	20	2	7	9	67	—	—	—	—	—
1996–97	Hartford Whalers	NHL	78	19	29	48	141	—	—	—	—	—
1997–98	Carolina Hurricanes	NHL	54	7	16	23	105	—	—	—	—	—
1998–99	Carolina Hurricanes	NHL	67	8	10	18	97	6	0	0	0	8
1999–2000	Ottawa Senators	NHL	67	4	8	12	67	—	—	—	—	—
2000–01	Columbus Blue Jackets	NHL	66	8	7	15	126	—	—	—	—	—
2001–02	Columbus Blue Jackets	NHL	59	5	8	13	62	—	—	—	—	—
2002–03	Columbus Blue Jackets	NHL	4	0	0	0	12	—	—	—	—	—
NHL totals			1,188	355	405	760	2,229	59	23	18	41	127

=== International ===
Year	Team	Event	GP	G	A	Pts	PIM
1984	Canada	OG	7	0	0	0	8
1985	Canada	WC	10	3	2	5	10
1987	Canada	WC	9	4	2	6	20
1987	Canada	CC	3	1	2	3	0
1989	Canada	WC	10	3	7	10	12
1993	Canada	WC	8	1	2	3	8
Senior totals			47	12	15	27	58

== Coaching record ==
=== NHL coaching record ===
Team	Year	Regular season						Postseason		
Team	Year	Games	Won	Lost	OTL/ SOL	Points	Finish	Won	Lost	Result
FLA	2011–12	82	38	26	18	94	1st in Southeast Division	3	4	Lost in First Round (NJD)
FLA	2012–13	48	15	27	6	36	5th in Southeast Division	—	—	Did not qualify
FLA	2013–14	16	3	9	4	(10)	7th in Atlantic Division	—	—	Fired mid-season
Total		146	56	62	28	.474	1 Division championship	3	4	0 Stanley Cups

=== Minor league coaching record ===
Team	Year	Regular season							Postseason
Team	Year	G	W	L	OTL	SOL	Pts	Finish	Result
POR	2005–06	80	53	19	5	3	114	1st in Atlantic	Won in division semi-finals (4-2 vs. PRO); Won in division finals (4-2 vs. HFD); Lost in conference finals (3-4 vs. HER)
POR	2006–07	80	37	31	3	9	86	6th in Atlantic	Did not qualify
POR	2007–08	80	45	26	5	4	99	3rd in Atlantic	Won in division semi-finals (4-1 vs. HFD); Won in division finals (4-2 vs. PRO); Lost in conference finals (3-4 vs. WBS)
POR	2008–09	80	39	31	3	7	88	3rd in Atlantic	Lost in division semi-finals (1-4 vs. PRO)
POR	2009–10	80	45	24	7	4	101	2nd in Atlantic	Lost in division semi-finals (0-4 vs. MAN
POR	2010–11	80	47	24	7	2	103	1st in Atlantic	Won in division semi-finals (4-2 vs. CT); Lost in division finals (2-4 vs. BNG)
POR totals	2005–2011	480	266	155	30	29	591	2 division title	29-29 (0.500) - 0 Calder Cups
SD	2019–20	57	30	19	6	2	68	4th in Pacific	Playoffs cancelled
SD	2020–21	44	26	17	1	0	53	3rd in Pacific	Lost in division semi-finals (1-2 vs. BAK)
SD totals	2019–2021	101	56	36	7	2	121	0 division titles	1-2 (0.333) - 0 Calder Cups
AHL totals	2005–2021	581	322	191	37	31	712	2 division title	30-31 (0.492) - 0 Calder Cups

== See also ==
- List of family relations in the NHL
- List of NHL players with 2,000 career penalty minutes
- List of NHL players with 1,000 games played

Preceded by Rick Tocchet	Philadelphia Flyers captain 1993–94	Succeeded by Eric Lindros
Preceded by Brendan Shanahan	Hartford Whalers/Carolina Hurricanes captain 1996–98	Succeeded by Keith Primeau
Preceded by Peter DeBoer	Head coach of the Florida Panthers; 2011–13	Succeeded by Peter Horachek
