= Vladislav Bulin =

Russian ice hockey player (born 1972)

- Born: May 18, 1972 (age 53) Penza, Russian SFSR, Soviet Union
- Height: 6 ft 0 in (183 cm)
- Weight: 220 lb (100 kg; 15 st 10 lb)
- Position: Defence
- Shot: Left
- Played for: HC Dynamo Moscow; SKA Saint Petersburg; Lada Togliatti; Metallurg Magnitogorsk; Neftekhimik Nizhnekamsk
- NHL draft: 103rd overall, 1992; Philadelphia Flyers
- Playing career: 1992–2012

Владислав Бульин (born May 18, 1972 in Penza, U.S.S.R.) is a former Russian professional ice hockey defenceman who played in the Russian Superleague and Kontinental Hockey League (KHL).

== Playing career ==
Bulin was drafted 103rd overall in the 5th round by the Philadelphia Flyers in the 1992 NHL entry draft. Boulin began his career with HC Dynamo Moscow of the Russian Super League, where he played two seasons. He then spent three seasons in the American Hockey League, two with the Hershey Bears, and one with the Philadelphia Phantoms. He split the 1997-98 season with Star Bulls Rosenheim of the Deutsche Eishockey Liga and Michigan K-Wings of the International Hockey League. He returned to the RSL for the 1998-99 season, playing for SKA Saint Petersburg, then went back to the DEL for 1999-2000. He played with Augsburger Panther that season, and the Hannover Scorpions the next. He finally returned once again to the RSL for 2001-02, playing two seasons for Lada Togliatti. He spent the 2003–04 and 2004-05 seasons once again with HC Dynamo Moscow, and has been with Metallurg Magnitogorsk every season since.

== Career statistics ==
=== Regular season and playoffs ===
			Regular season					Playoffs
Season	Team	League	GP	G	A	Pts	PIM	GP	G	A	Pts	PIM
1992–93	HC Dynamo Moscow	IHL	32	2	1	3	55	4	0	0	0	2
1993–94	HC Dynamo Moscow	IHL	43	4	2	6	36	7	0	1	1	16
1994–95	Hershey Bears	AHL	52	1	7	8	30	—	—	—	—	—
1995–96	Hershey Bears	AHL	32	1	2	3	30	2	0	0	0	0
1996–97	Philadelphia Phantoms	AHL	51	1	4	5	35	—	—	—	—	—
1997–98	Michigan K-Wings	IHL	2	0	1	1	0	—	—	—	—	—
1997–98	Starbulls Rosenheim	DEL	28	0	4	4	12	—	—	—	—	—
1998–99	SKA Saint Petersburg	RSL	23	1	3	4	12	—	—	—	—	—
1999–00	Augsburger Panther	DEL	54	1	4	5	176	3	0	0	0	2
2000–01	Hannover Scorpions	DEL	58	3	10	13	168	6	2	0	2	22
2001–02	Lada Togliatti	RSL	51	0	4	4	134	4	0	1	1	10
2002–03	Lada Togliatti	RSL	34	1	0	1	126	7	0	0	0	24
2003–04	HC Dynamo Moscow	RSL	58	3	3	6	111	1	0	0	0	2
2004–05	HC Dynamo Moscow	RSL	46	3	7	10	127	6	0	0	0	6
2005–06	Metallurg Magnitogorsk	RSL	44	2	11	13	87	11	1	1	2	16
2006–07	Metallurg Magnitogorsk	RSL	50	0	4	4	157	7	0	0	0	30
2007–08	Metallurg Magnitogorsk	RSL	53	3	1	4	122	10	1	1	2	12
2008–09	Metallurg Magnitogorsk	KHL	48	2	4	6	140	11	1	0	1	24
2009–10	Metallurg Magnitogorsk	KHL	47	7	6	13	97	4	0	0	0	18
2010–11	Neftekhimik Nizhnekamsk	KHL	18	0	4	4	27	—	—	—	—	—
2011–12	Dizel Penza	VHL	34	0	2	2	110	14	1	0	1	14
RSL totals			434	19	36	55	967	46	2	3	5	100
KHL totals			113	9	14	23	264	15	1	0	1	32

=== International ===
Year	Team	Event	Result	GP	G	A	Pts	PIM
1992	CIS	WJC	1st place, gold medalist(s)	7	0	0	0	10
