= Filipp Metlyuk =

Russian ice hockey player

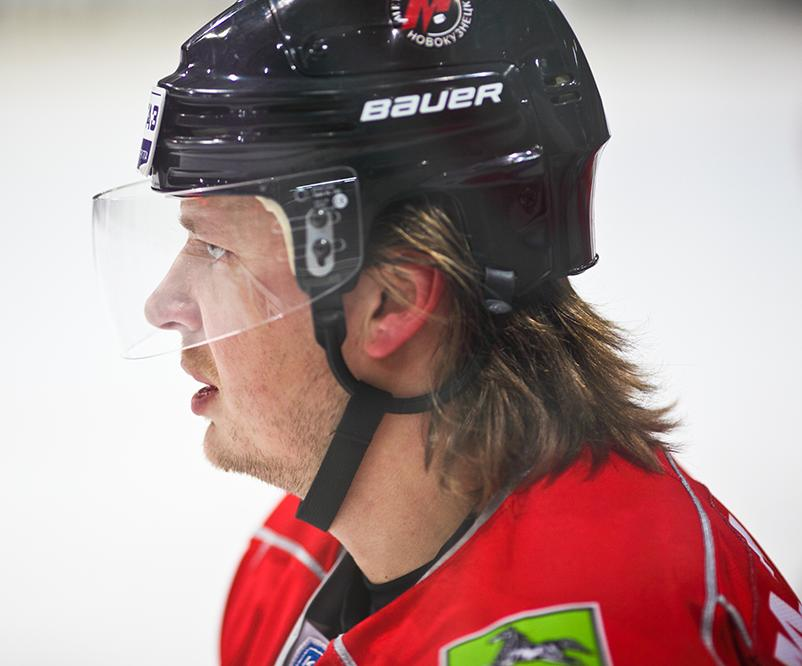
- Filipp Metlyuk 2012
- Born: December 13, 1981 (age 43); Togliatti, Russian SFSR
- Height: 6 ft 0 in (183 cm)
- Weight: 181 lb (82 kg; 12 st 13 lb)
- Position: Defence
- Shoots: Left
- KHL team Former teams: Salavat Yulaev Ufa; Lada Togliatti; Atlant Moscow Oblast; Avangard Omsk; CSKA Moscow; HC Yugra; Metallurg Novokuznetsk; Metallurg Magnitogorsk; Avtomobilist Yekaterinburg
- Playing career: 2000–present

Filipp Metlyuk (born December 13, 1981) is a Russian professional ice hockey defenceman who currently plays for Salavat Yulaev Ufa of the Kontinental Hockey League (KHL). He has previously played with HC Yugra amongst 5 other KHL clubs.
