= 1992–93 Ottawa Senators season =

NHL hockey team season (inaugural season)

1992–93 Ottawa Senators
- Division: 6th Adams
- Conference: 12th Wales
- 1992–93 record: 10–70–4
- Home record: 9–29–4
- Road record: 1–41–0
- Goals for: 202
- Goals against: 395

Team information
- General manager: Mel Bridgman
- Coach: Rick Bowness
- Captain: Laurie Boschman
- Alternate captains: Brad Marsh; Brad Shaw; Sylvain Turgeon
- Arena: Ottawa Civic Centre
- Average attendance: 10,485
- Minor league affiliates: New Haven Senators; Thunder Bay Senators

Team leaders
- Goals: Sylvain Turgeon (25)
- Assists: Norm Maciver (46)
- Points: Norm Maciver (63)
- Penalty minutes: Mike Peluso (318)
- Plus/minus: Dave Archibald (-16)
- Wins: Peter Sidorkiewicz (8)
- Goals against average: Daniel Berthiaume (4.30)

The 1992–93 Ottawa Senators season was the first season of the modern Ottawa Senators franchise in the National Hockey League (NHL). (Note: The modern Ottawa Senators franchise is not a revival of the original franchise that operated from 1883 to 1934 and does not claim any of the Stanley Cups awarded to the early teams.) Despite winning the first game of the regular season on October 8, 1992, the Senators won only nine more en route to their worst season ever. The team recorded three NHL records that season: the longest home losing streak of eleven, from October 27 to December 8; the longest road losing streak with a total of 39, from October 10 to April 3 (nearly the whole season) and fewest road wins in a season, with just one victory.

== Background ==
The second iteration of the Ottawa Senators began in 1989 when Bruce Firestone, Cyril Leeder, and Randy Sexton came together to plan their attempt at acquiring a National Hockey League (NHL) franchise. The NHL was looking to add two new franchises by the 1992–93 season and after adding key personnel such as Jim Durrell, and Frank Finnigan from the original Senators franchise, the group submitted their proposal to the NHL. On December 6, 1990, the group was awarded a franchise upon payment of a $50 million expansion fee, which required additional investors, led by Rod Bryden.

In August 1991, Mel Bridgman was named the Senators first general manager. While awaiting approval of the Palladium, their planned arena, the Senators agreed with the City of Ottawa to lease the Ottawa Civic Centre in December 1991, to play in for the upcoming season.

== Offseason ==
Adams Division teams

On June 2, 1992, the then city of Kanata, Ontario, gave approval of the "Palladium" project. On June 29, the club held ground-breaking ceremonies for the Palladium project at the site. The team was still seeking partners for financing the project and Ogden Corporation would back $120 million in loans on November 11. Actual construction would begin in 1994. On June 15, Rick Bowness was named as the team's first head coach. Bowness was previously a head coach for the Winnipeg Jets and Boston Bruins. He added Alain Vigneault, former coach of the Hull Olympiques of the Quebec Major Junior Hockey League, and E. J. McGuire, former coach of the Maine Mariners of the American Hockey League (AHL) and assistant coach in the NHL with the Chicago Blackhawks and Philadelphia Flyers, as his own assistant coaches. Jim Durrell, a former Ottawa mayor who became the team's first president on December 17, 1990, resigned on July 29.

== Preseason ==
The Senators held their first training camp beginning on September 8 with medical evaluations. Forty-four rookies and 32 veteran players were invited to the camp. The camp was split between the Robert Guertin Arena in Hull, Quebec, from September 11 to 24, and the Kanata Recreation Complex from September 25 to October 7. Additionally, an intra-squad game was held in Brockville, Ontario on September 20. The first roster cuts took place on September 13, with the release of 11 players. On September 15, 28 players were assigned to Ottawa's AHL affiliate, the New Haven Senators.

The team played its first preseason exhibition game in Hartford against the Hartford Whalers on September 18. The game ended in a 1–1 tie, and the Senators first goal was scored by Neil Brady. The Senators cut nine more players after the game, releasing five players and sending four others back to their junior teams. The Washington Capitals won the first game played in Ottawa on September 21 in overtime, 4–3. Dubbed the "Capital Cup", they played a second game against the Capitals on September 22, in which they were blown out, 8–1. The first win by the Senators since re-entry into the NHL was recorded on September 24, a 4–3 victory over the New York Islanders. Defenceman Brad Shaw scored the winning goal. Ottawa then lost the next game to the Tampa Bay Lightning on September 25, 3–2. The team followed that up with another loss to Tampa Bay on September 27, 4–3.

On September 27, it was announced that Ottawa had signed former Philadelphia Flyers' winger Brad Jones to a professional tryout contract (PTO). On September 30, the Senators lost 4–3 in overtime to Hartford. Ottawa finished its preseason schedule with another 4–3 loss to Hartford on October 1. Following the game, Ottawa cut four more players from its training camp roster, bringing the total remaining to 31. On October 4, the Senators claimed Norm Maciver in the waiver draft from the Edmonton Oilers. In a final series of roster cuts before the season began, three more players were assigned to New Haven bringing the number down to 29. On October 7, just before the start of the regular season, the Senators announced Laurie Boschman as the team's first captain, with Sylvain Turgeon, Brad Shaw, and Brad Marsh as the alternates. The same day, Jones' PTO expired and the Senators sent him to New Haven on an amateur tryout. However, by the end of October, the team and the player could not agree on a contract and Jones departed.

== Regular season ==
The Senators finished last in goals scored (202), wins (10), points (24, tied with the San Jose Sharks), even-strength goals scored (129), power-play goals for (66, tied with the Edmonton Oilers and the San Jose Sharks), power play goals against (115) and power play % (14.73) and shooting percentage (8.9%; 202 goals on 2,281 shots).

The Senators recorded their first win of the season in their opening game against the Montreal Canadiens in Ottawa, 5–3. They did not win again until November 25, a 3–1 victory at home over the New Jersey Devils. Despite being the worst team in the league, two players — defenceman Brad Marsh and goaltender Peter Sidorkiewicz — were selected to play in the 1993 NHL All-Star Game. The Senators only won six more times after the All-Star break, recording their only road victory of the season against the New York Islanders, 5–3, on April 10, 1993.

=== Highlights ===
The new Senators played their first game on October 8, 1992, in the Ottawa Civic Centre defeating the eventual Stanley Cup champion Montreal Canadiens by a score of 5–3. The game was televised on Hockey Night in Canada and was in front of a sold-out Ottawa Civic Centre with 10,449 in attendance. Lyndon Slewidge performed the national anthem before the game. The ceremonial faceoff between Laurie Boschman and Denis Savard was done by Frank Finnigan, Jr. (his father having died on Christmas Day, 1991), Bruce Firestone and NHL president Gil Stein. There was much pre-game spectacle—the skating of Brian Orser, the nine banners being raised to honour the original Senators' Stanley Cup wins, retirement of Frank Finnigan's jersey number and the singing of the anthem by Alanis Morissette. The game was attended by Russell Williams, an Ottawa fan who had witnessed the last Stanley Cup win in Ottawa in the 1927 Stanley Cup Final, and would later attend the games of the 2007 Stanley Cup Final, held in Ottawa.

The starting lineup of the team's first ever game consisted of;

- Peter Sidorkiewicz, goal
- Ken Hammond, defence
- Brad Shaw, defence
- Neil Brady, centre
- Jody Hull, right wing
- Sylvain Turgeon, left wing

The remaining players filling out the game day roster included: forwards Mark Lamb, Doug Smail, Darcy Loewen, Jamie Baker, Laurie Boschman, Andrew McBain, Tomas Jelinek, Mike Peluso, Marc Fortier, defencemen Norm Maciver, Chris Luongo, Mark Osiecki, Darren Rumble, and goaltender Steve Weeks. Brady scored the first goal for the modern-day Ottawa Senators franchise in the game. Smail had the first multi-goal game of the team's history, notching two.

Two Senators recorded hat tricks during the regular season; Bob Kudelski scored one in a 3–2 victory over San Jose on January 10, 1993 and Laurie Boschman scored one on April 10, 1993, in a 5–3 win on the road against the New York Islanders.

== Final standings ==
Adams Division
	GP	W	L	T	Pts	GF	GA
**Boston Bruins**	84	51	26	7	**109**	332	268
**Quebec Nordiques**	84	47	27	10	**104**	351	300
**Montreal Canadiens**	84	48	30	6	**102**	326	280
**Buffalo Sabres**	84	38	36	10	**86**	335	297
Hartford Whalers	84	26	52	6	58	284	369
Ottawa Senators	84	10	70	4	24	202	395

Note: GP = Games played, W = Wins, L = Losses, T = Ties, Pts = Points, GF = Goals for, GA = Goals against
Note: Teams that qualified for the playoffs are highlighted in bold.

Wales Conference
R		Div	GP	W	L	T	GF	GA	Pts
**1**	**p – Pittsburgh Penguins**	**PTK**	**84**	**56**	**21**	**7**	**367**	**268**	**119**
**2**	**Boston Bruins**	**ADM**	**84**	**51**	**26**	**7**	**332**	**268**	**109**
**3**	**Quebec Nordiques**	**ADM**	**84**	**47**	**27**	**10**	**351**	**300**	**104**
**4**	**Montreal Canadiens**	**ADM**	**84**	**48**	**30**	**6**	**326**	**280**	**102**
**5**	**Washington Capitals**	**PTK**	**84**	**43**	**34**	**7**	**325**	**286**	**93**
**6**	**New York Islanders**	**PTK**	**84**	**40**	**37**	**7**	**335**	**297**	**87**
**7**	**New Jersey Devils**	**PTK**	**84**	**40**	**37**	**7**	**308**	**299**	**87**
**8**	**Buffalo Sabres**	**ADM**	**84**	**38**	**36**	**10**	**335**	**297**	**86**
9	Philadelphia Flyers	PTK	84	36	37	11	319	319	83
10	New York Rangers	PTK	84	34	39	11	304	308	79
11	Hartford Whalers	ADM	84	26	52	6	284	369	58
12	Ottawa Senators	ADM	84	10	70	4	202	395	24

p – Won Presidents' Trophy (and division)
Divisions: PTK – Patrick, ADM – Adams
bold – Qualified for playoffs

== Schedule and results ==
1992–93 regular season
October: 1–9–1 (home: 1–3–1; road: 0–6–0)

Game	Date	Visitor	Score	Home	OT	Decision	Attendance	Arena	Record	Points	Recap
1	October 8	Montreal	3–5	Ottawa		Sidorkiewicz	10,449	Ottawa Civic Centre	1–0–0	2	W
2	October 10	Ottawa	2–9	Quebec		Weeks	15,399	Le Colisée	1–1–0	2	L
3	October 12	Ottawa	3–6	Boston		Sidorkiewicz	13,056	Boston Garden	1–2–0	2	L
4	October 14	Ottawa	1–4	Hartford		Sidorkiewicz	7,628	Hartford Civic Center	1–3–0	2	L
5	October 16	Ottawa	1–5	Washington		Sidorkiewicz	12,911	Capital Centre	1–4–0	2	L
6	October 20	Ottawa	3–5	Toronto		Sidorkiewicz	7,186	Copps Coliseum	1–5–0	2	L
7	October 22	Hartford	5–1	Ottawa		Sidorkiewicz	10,392	Ottawa Civic Centre	1–6–0	2	L
8	October 24	NY Rangers	3–2	Ottawa	OT	Sidorkiewicz	10,089	Ottawa Civic Centre	1–7–0	2	L
9	October 27	Pittsburgh	7–2	Ottawa		Sidorkiewicz	10,500	Ottawa Civic Centre	1–8–0	2	L
10	October 30	Ottawa	3–12	Buffalo		Weeks	15,088	Buffalo Memorial Auditorium	1–9–0	2	L
11	October 31	Buffalo	2–2	Ottawa	OT	Sidorkiewicz	10,500	Ottawa Civic Centre	1–9–1	3	T

November: 1–13–0 (home: 1–6–0; road: 0–7–0)

Game	Date	Visitor	Score	Home	OT	Decision	Attendance	Arena	Record	Points	Recap
12	November 3	Ottawa	2–5	Edmonton		Sidorkiewicz	12,738	Northlands Coliseum	1–10–1	3	L
13	November 5	Ottawa	4–8	Calgary		Madeley	18,736	Olympic Saddledome	1–11–1	3	L
14	November 6	Ottawa	1–4	Vancouver		Madeley	15,332	Pacific Coliseum	1–12–1	3	L
15	November 9	Toronto	3–1	Ottawa		Sidorkiewicz	10,500	Ottawa Civic Centre	1–13–1	3	L
16	November 11	Quebec	7–3	Ottawa		Sidorkiewicz	10,500	Ottawa Civic Centre	1–14–1	3	L
17	November 13	Ottawa	0–1	Tampa Bay		Sidorkiewicz	10,425	Expo Hall	1–15–1	3	L
18	November 15	Ottawa	2–7	Philadelphia		Sidorkiewicz	17,216	Spectrum	1–16–1	3	L
19	November 17	Montreal	5–3	Ottawa		Sidorkiewicz	10,500	Ottawa Civic Centre	1–17–1	3	L
20	November 19	Hartford	4–2	Ottawa		Sidorkiewicz	10,500	Ottawa Civic Centre	1–18–1	3	L
21	November 21	Ottawa	1–3	Montreal		Sidorkiewicz	16,689	Montreal Forum	1–19–1	3	L
22	November 23	Boston	3–2	Ottawa		Sidorkiewicz	10,500	Ottawa Civic Centre	1–20–1	3	L
23	November 25	New Jersey	1–3	Ottawa		Sidorkiewicz	10,500	Ottawa Civic Centre	2–20–1	5	W
24	November 27	Ottawa	1–4	Buffalo		Sidorkiewicz	16,325	Buffalo Auditorium	2–21–1	5	L
25	November 29	Buffalo	5–2	Ottawa		Sidorkiewicz	10,500	Ottawa Civic Centre	2–22–1	5	L

December: 1–12–2 (home: 1–6–2; road: 0–6–0)

Game	Date	Visitor	Score	Home	OT	Decision	Attendance	Arena	Record	Points	Recap
26	December 1	Minnesota	3–1	Ottawa		Sidorkiewicz	10,500	Ottawa Civic Centre	2–23–1	5	L
27	December 3	New Jersey	3–3	Ottawa	OT	Sidorkiewicz	10,500	Ottawa Civic Centre	2–23–2	6	T
28	December 5	Philadelphia	2–3	Ottawa		Sidorkiewicz	10,500	Ottawa Civic Centre	3–23–2	8	W
29	December 7	Washington	6–5	Ottawa		Weeks	10,500	Ottawa Civic Centre	3–24–2	8	L
30	December 9	Ottawa	2–6	Hartford		Weeks	8,227	Hartford Civic Center	3–25–2	8	L
31	December 10	Ottawa	2–4	Boston		Sidorkiewicz	13,509	Boston Garden	3–26–2	8	L
32	December 12	Calgary	1–1	Ottawa	OT	Sidorkiewicz	10,500	Ottawa Civic Centre	3–26–3	9	T
33	December 15	Detroit	3–2	Ottawa	OT	Sidorkiewicz	10,500	Ottawa Civic Centre	3–27–3	9	L
34	December 17	Ottawa	3–9	NY Islanders		Weeks	7,689	Nassau Coliseum	3–28–3	9	L
35	December 19	Ottawa	1–5	Toronto		Sidorkiewicz	15,720	Maple Leaf Gardens	3–29–3	9	L
36	December 21	Washington	4–3	Ottawa		Sidorkiewicz	10,500	Ottawa Civic Centre	3–30–3	9	L
37	December 23	Washington	4–2	Ottawa		Sidorkiewicz	10,500	Ottawa Civic Centre	3–31–3	9	L
38	December 26	Ottawa	2–4	Quebec		Berthiaume	15,337	Le Colisée	3–32–3	9	L
39	December 27	Quebec	6–1	Ottawa		Berthiaume	10,500	Ottawa Civic Centre	3–33–3	9	L
40	December 31	Ottawa	4–5	Detroit	OT	Sidorkiewicz	19,875	Joe Louis Arena	3–34–3	9	L

January: 2–12–0 (home: 2–5–0; road: 0–7–0)

Game	Date	Visitor	Score	Home	OT	Decision	Attendance	Arena	Record	Points	Recap
41	January 2	Buffalo	7–2	Ottawa		Berthiaume	10,500	Ottawa Civic Centre	3–35–3	9	L
42	January 6	Ottawa	2–6	NY Rangers		Sidorkiewicz	18,200	Madison Square Garden	3–36–3	9	L
43	January 8	Ottawa	4–6	New Jersey		Sidorkiewicz	12,406	Brendan Byrne Arena	3–37–3	9	L
44	January 10	San Jose	2–3	Ottawa		Berthiaume	10,500	Ottawa Civic Centre	4–37–3	11	W
45	January 12	Los Angeles	3–2	Ottawa		Berthiaume	10,500	Ottawa Civic Centre	4–38–3	11	L
46	January 14	St. Louis	4–1	Ottawa		Berthiaume	10,500	Ottawa Civic Centre	4–39–3	11	L
47	January 16	Ottawa	1–6	Pittsburgh		Sidorkiewicz	16,154	Pittsburgh Civic Arena	4–40–3	11	L
48	January 17	NY Islanders	7–2	Ottawa		Sidorkiewicz	10,500	Ottawa Civic Centre	4–41–3	11	L
49	January 19	Quebec	5–2	Ottawa		Berthiaume	10,500	Ottawa Civic Centre	4–42–3	11	L
50	January 21	Ottawa	2–7	Minnesota		Sidorkiewicz	10,265	Met Center	4–43–3	11	L
51	January 23	Ottawa	4–6	Washington		Sidorkiewicz	17,793	Capital Centre	4–44–3	11	L
52	January 26	Ottawa	1–5	St. Louis		Sidorkiewicz	15,554	St. Louis Arena	4–45–3	11	L
53	January 28	Hartford	2–5	Ottawa		Berthiaume	10,304	Ottawa Civic Centre	5–45–3	13	W
54	January 30	Ottawa	3–5	Montreal		Berthiaume	16,787	Montreal Forum	5–46–3	13	L

February: 4–7–1 (home: 4–2–1; road: 0–5–0)

Game	Date	Visitor	Score	Home	OT	Decision	Attendance	Arena	Record	Points	Recap
55	February 1	Winnipeg	4–4	Ottawa	OT	Berthiaume	10,373	Ottawa Civic Centre	5–46–4	14	T
56	February 3	Edmonton	2–3	Ottawa		Sidorkiewicz	10,425	Ottawa Civic Centre	6–46–4	16	W
57	February 8	Buffalo	2–4	Ottawa		Sidorkiewicz	10,442	Ottawa Civic Centre	7–46–4	18	W
58	February 9	Ottawa	1–8	Philadelphia		Sidorkiewicz	17,185	Spectrum	7–47–4	18	L
59	February 13	Montreal	4–1	Ottawa		Sidorkiewicz	10,500	Ottawa Civic Centre	7–48–4	18	L
60	February 17	Ottawa	4–6	Quebec		Berthiaume	14,385	Le Colisée	7–49–4	18	L
61	February 20	Ottawa	4–5	Montreal		Sidorkiewicz	16,859	Montreal Forum	7–50–4	18	L
62	February 22	Ottawa	3–6	Winnipeg		Berthiaume	12,816	Winnipeg Arena	7–51–4	18	L
63	February 23	Winnipeg	8–2	Ottawa		Sidorkiewicz	7,245	Saskatchewan Place	7–52–4	18	L
64	February 25	Pittsburgh	1–2	Ottawa		Sidorkiewicz	10,500	Ottawa Civic Centre	8–52–4	20	W
65	February 27	Ottawa	2–5	New Jersey		Sidorkiewicz	18,111	Brendan Byrne Arena	8–53–4	20	L
66	February 28	Quebec	4–6	Ottawa		Sidorkiewicz	10,500	Ottawa Civic Centre	9–53–4	22	W

March: 0–10–0 (home: 0–3–0; road: 0–7–0)

Game	Date	Visitor	Score	Home	OT	Decision	Attendance	Arena	Record	Points	Recap
67	March 2	Ottawa	2–3	San Jose	OT	Sidorkiewicz	11,089	Cow Palace	9–54–4	22	L
68	March 4	Ottawa	6–8	Los Angeles		Berthiaume	16,005	Great Western Forum	9–55–4	22	L
69	March 7	Ottawa	2–4	Chicago		Berthiaume	18,472	Chicago Stadium	9–56–4	22	L
70	March 13	Ottawa	3–6	Boston		Sidorkiewicz	8,974	Boston Garden	9–57–4	22	L
71	March 18	Boston	4–1	Ottawa		Sidorkiewicz	10,500	Ottawa Civic Centre	9–58–4	22	L
72	March 22	NY Rangers	5–4	Ottawa		Sidorkiewicz	10,449	Ottawa Civic Centre	9–59–4	22	L
73	March 25	Tampa Bay	3–2	Ottawa	OT	Berthiaume	10,500	Ottawa Civic Centre	9–60–4	22	L
74	March 27	Ottawa	3–4	Montreal	OT	Berthiaume	16,944	Montreal Forum	9–61–4	22	L
75	March 28	Ottawa	1–3	Buffalo		Sidorkiewicz	15,320	Buffalo Auditorium	9–62–4	22	L
76	March 30	Ottawa	4–6	Pittsburgh		Sidorkiewicz	16,065	Pittsburgh Civic Arena	9–63–4	22	L

April: 1–7–0 (home: 0–4–0; road: 1–3–0)

Game	Date	Visitor	Score	Home	OT	Decision	Attendance	Arena	Record	Points	Recap
77	April 1	Quebec	4–2	Ottawa		Berthiaume	10,500	Ottawa Civic Centre	9–64–4	22	L
78	April 3	Ottawa	3–7	Hartford		Berthiaume	13,005	Hartford Civic Center	9–65–4	22	L
79	April 4	Vancouver	3–0	Ottawa		Sidorkiewicz	10,500	Ottawa Civic Centre	9–66–4	22	L
80	April 7	Hartford	6–1	Ottawa		Berthiaume	10,439	Ottawa Civic Centre	9–67–4	22	L
81	April 10	Ottawa	5–3	NY Islanders		Sidorkiewicz	11,835	Nassau Coliseum	10–67–4	24	W
82	April 11	Ottawa	2–4	Boston		Sidorkiewicz	14,448	Boston Garden	10–68–4	24	L
83	April 13	Ottawa	2–6	Quebec		Berthiaume	15,399	Le Colisée	10–69–4	24	L
84	April 14	Boston	4–2	Ottawa		Sidorkiewicz	10,500	Ottawa Civic Centre	10–70–4	24	L

Legend: W Win (2 points) L Loss (0 points) T Tie (1 point)

== Player statistics ==
=== Regular season ===
==== Scoring ====
Regular season
Player	Pos	GP	G	A	Pts	PIM	+/-	PPG	SHG	GWG
Norm Maciver	D	80	17	46	63	84	−46	7	1	2
Jamie Baker	C	76	19	29	48	54	−20	10	0	2
Sylvain Turgeon	LW	72	25	18	43	104	−29	8	0	2
Brad Shaw	D	81	7	34	41	34	−47	4	0	0
Bob Kudelski	RW	48	21	14	35	22	−22	12	0	2
Jody Hull	RW	69	13	21	34	14	−24	5	1	0
Mark Lamb	C	71	7	19	26	64	−40	1	0	0
Mike Peluso	LW	81	15	10	25	318	−35	2	0	1
Mark Freer	C	63	10	14	24	39	−35	3	3	0
Neil Brady	C	55	7	17	24	57	−25	5	0	0
Andrew McBain	RW	59	7	16	23	43	−37	1	0	0
Laurie Boschman	C	70	9	7	16	101	−26	0	1	1
Darren Rumble	D	69	3	13	16	61	−24	0	0	0
Dave Archibald	C/LW	44	9	6	15	32	−16	6	0	0
Doug Smail	LW	51	4	10	14	51	−34	0	0	0
Tomas Jelinek	RW	49	7	6	13	52	−21	0	0	0
Chris Luongo	D	76	3	9	12	68	−47	1	0	0
Jeff Lazaro	LW	26	6	4	10	16	−8	0	1	0
Rob Murphy	C	44	3	7	10	30	−23	0	0	0
Darcy Loewen	LW	79	4	5	9	145	−26	0	0	0
Ken Hammond	D	62	4	4	8	104	−42	0	0	0
Gord Dineen	D	32	2	4	6	30	−19	1	0	0
Mark Osiecki	D	34	0	4	4	12	−21	0	0	0
Brad Marsh	D	59	0	3	3	30	−29	0	0	0
Blair Atcheynum	RW	4	0	1	1	0	−3	0	0	0
Daniel Berthiaume	G	25	0	1	1	2	0	0	0	0
Marc Fortier	C	10	0	1	1	6	−7	0	0	0
Jim Kyte	D	4	0	1	1	4	0	0	0	0
Dominic Lavoie	D	2	0	1	1	0	0	0	0	0
Jim Thomson	RW	15	0	1	1	41	−11	0	0	0
Tony Cimellaro	C	2	0	0	0	0	−2	0	0	0
Radek Hamr	D	4	0	0	0	0	−4	0	0	0
Lonnie Loach	LW	3	0	0	0	0	0	0	0	0
Darrin Madeley	G	2	0	0	0	0	0	0	0	0
Brad Miller	D	11	0	0	0	42	−5	0	0	0
Kent Paynter	D	6	0	0	0	20	−7	0	0	0
Peter Sidorkiewicz	G	64	0	0	0	8	0	0	0	0
Martin St. Amour	LW	1	0	0	0	2	0	0	0	0
Steve Weeks	G	7	0	0	0	0	0	0	0	0

==== Goaltending ====
Regular season
Player	MIN	GP	W	L	T	GA	GAA	SO	SA	SV	SV%
Peter Sidorkiewicz	3388	64	8	46	3	250	4.43	0	1737	1487	.856
Daniel Berthiaume	1326	25	2	17	1	95	4.30	0	739	644	.871
Darrin Madeley	90	2	0	2	0	10	6.67	0	44	34	.773
Steve Weeks	249	7	0	5	0	30	7.23	0	144	114	.792
Team:	5053	84	10	70	4	385	4.57	0	2664	2279	.855

Note:

Pos = Position;GP = Games played; G = Goals; A = Assists; Pts = Points; PIM = Penalty minutes; +/- = Plus/minus; PPG = Power-play goals; SHG = Short-handed goals; GWG = Game-winning goals
Pos = Position;GP = Games played; Min, TOI = Minutes played; W = Wins; L = Losses; T,T/OT = Ties; OTL = Overtime losses; GA = Goals-against; GAA = Goals-against average; SO = Shutouts; SA = Shots against; SV = Shots saved;SV% = Save percentage;

== Awards and records ==
=== Awards ===
- Molson Cup – Sylvain Turgeon
- NHL All-Star Game selection – Brad Marsh, Peter Sidorkiewicz

=== Milestones ===
Date	Player	
January 10, 1993	Bob Kudelski	First hat trick by a Senator
February 1, 1993	Laurie Boschman	First penalty shot by a Senator (goal)

Source: Ottawa Senators 2007–08 Media Guide. Ottawa Senators. 2007.

== Transactions ==
The Senators were involved in the following transactions during the 1992–93 season.

=== Trades ===
Date	Details		Ref
June 20, 1992	To New York Rangers Future considerations	To Ottawa Senators 11th-round pick in 1992	
June 22, 1992	To Calgary Flames Chris Lindberg	To Ottawa Senators Mark Osiecki	
July 20, 1992	To Toronto Maple Leafs Future considerations	To Ottawa Senators Brad Marsh	
July 28, 1992	To New York Rangers Future considerations	To Ottawa Senators Jody Hull	
August 13, 1992	To Washington Capitals Future considerations	To Ottawa Senators Steve Weeks	
September 3, 1992	To New Jersey Devils Future considerations	To Ottawa Senators Neil Brady	
November 5, 1992	To New York Rangers 5th-round pick in 1993	To Ottawa Senators Dave Archibald	
December 19, 1992	To Los Angeles Kings Marc Fortier; Jim Thomson	To Ottawa Senators Bob Kudelski; Shawn McCosh	
February 25, 1993	To Toronto Maple Leafs Brad Miller	To Ottawa Senators 9th-round pick in 1993	
March 4, 1993	To Winnipeg Jets 4th-round pick in 1993	To Ottawa Senators Signing rights to Dmitri Filimonov	

=== Players acquired ===
Date	Player	Former team	Term	Via	Ref
July 15, 1992	Tomas Jelinek	HC Sierre	2-year	Free agency	
July 16, 1992	Martin St. Amour	Cincinnati Cyclones (ECHL)	—N/a	Free agency	(Note: Other sources have St. Amour's contract announced on August 6.)
July 30, 1992	Andrew McBain	Vancouver Canucks	—N/a	Free agency	(Note: Other sources have McBain signing with Ottawa on June 22.)
July 30, 1992	Marc Labelle	Montreal Canadiens	—N/a	Free agency	
August 6, 1992	Mark Ferner	Toronto Maple Leafs	—N/a	Free agency	
August 6, 1992	Scott White	Greensboro Monarchs (ECHL)	—N/a	Free agency	
August 30, 1992	Doug Smail	Quebec Nordiques	—N/a	Free agency	
August 31, 1992	Gord Dineen	Pittsburgh Penguins	—N/a	Free agency	
September 2, 1992	Jamie Baker	Quebec Nordiques	—N/a	Free agency	
September 9, 1992	Chris Luongo	Detroit Red Wings	—N/a	Free agency	
September 10, 1992	Jim Kyte	Calgary Flames	—N/a	Free agency	
October 1, 1992	Marc Fortier	Quebec Nordiques	—N/a	Free agency	
October 4, 1992	Norm Maciver	Edmonton Oilers	—N/a	Waivers	
October 1992	Radek Hamr	Sparta Praha (CSSR)	—N/a	Free agency	
December 15, 1992	Daniel Berthiaume	EC Graz (Alpenliga)	—N/a	Free agency	
December 15, 1992	Paul Lawless	EC Graz	—N/a	Free agency	

=== Players lost ===
Date	Player	New team	Via	Ref
October 21, 1992	Lonnie Loach	Los Angeles Kings	Waivers	
February 12, 1993	Paul Lawless	Cincinnati Cyclones	Free agency	
February 12, 1993	Steve Weeks	—N/a	Retirement	
February 20, 1993	Mark Osiecki	Winnipeg Jets	Waivers	

=== Player signings ===
Date	Player	Term	Ref
June 20, 1992	Darrin Madeley	3-year‡	
July 30, 1992	Tony Cimellaro	—N/a	
August 30, 1992	Brian Downey	2-year‡	
September 10, 1992	Brad Shaw	1-year‡	
October 2, 1992	Trent McCleary	—N/a	
October 9, 1992	Andy Schneider	—N/a	

‡ Contract has an additional option year.

== Draft picks ==
=== Expansion draft ===
The Senators participated in the 1992 NHL expansion draft on June 18, 1992, to fill their roster for the 1992–93 NHL season.

Round	#	Player	Nationality	NHL team
1	2	Peter Sidorkiewicz	Poland	Hartford Whalers
2	3	Mark Laforest	Canada	New York Rangers
3	5	Brad Shaw	Canada	New Jersey Devils
4	8	Darren Rumble	Canada	Philadelphia Flyers
5	10	Dominic Lavoie	Canada	St. Louis Blues
6	11	Brad Miller	Canada	Buffalo Sabres
7	13	Ken Hammond	Canada	Vancouver Canucks
8	16	Kent Paynter	Canada	Winnipeg Jets
9	18	John Van Kessel	Canada	Los Angeles Kings
10	20	Sylvain Turgeon	Canada	Montreal Canadiens
11	21	Mike Peluso	United States	Chicago Blackhawks
12	23	Rob Murphy	Canada	Vancouver Canucks
13	25	Mark Lamb	Canada	Edmonton Oilers
14	27	Laurie Boschman	Canada	New Jersey Devils
15	29	Jim Thomson	Canada	Los Angeles Kings
16	31	Lonnie Loach	Canada	Detroit Red Wings
17	33	Mark Freer	Canada	Philadelphia Flyers
18	35	Chris Lindberg	Canada	Calgary Flames
19	37	Jeff Lazaro	United States	Boston Bruins
20	39	Darcy Loewen	Canada	Buffalo Sabres
21	41	Blair Atcheynum	Canada	Hartford Whalers

=== Entry draft ===
Ottawa's draft picks at the 1992 NHL entry draft in Montreal, Quebec.

Round	#	Player	Nationality	College/Junior/Club team (League)
1	2	Alexei Yashin	Russia	HC Dynamo Moscow (Russia)
2	25	Chad Penney	Canada	North Bay Centennials (OHL)
3	50	Patrick Traverse	Canada	Shawinigan Cataractes (QMJHL)
4	73	Radek Hamr	Czechoslovakia	HC Sparta Praha (Czech.)
5	98	Daniel Guerard	Canada	Victoriaville Tigres (QMJHL)
6	121	Alan Sinclair	United States	University of Michigan (NCAA)
7	146	Jaroslav Miklenda	Czechoslovakia	DS Olomuc (Czech.)
8	169	Jay Kenney	United States	Canterbury School (US HS)
9	194	Claude Savoie	Canada	Victoriaville Tigres (QMJHL)
10	217	Jack Grimes	Canada	Belleville Bulls (OHL)
11	242	Tomas Jelinek	Czechoslovakia	HPK Hameenlinna (Finland)
11	264	Petter Ronnquist	Sweden	Nacka (Sweden)
S	2	Steve Flomenhoft	United States	Harvard University (ECAC)

== Farm teams ==
The New Haven Senators were Ottawa's senior affiliate, playing in the American Hockey League. An agreement was reached with the team in December 1991 to be Senators' first affiliate. Ottawa came to an agreement with the Thunder Bay Thunder Hawks of the Colonial Hockey League in September 1992 to be their secondary affiliate and established their minor league training and development centre in Thunder Bay, Ontario.

=== New Haven Senators ===
The New Haven Senators were coached by Don MacAdam. The team finished the 1992–93 season with a 22–47–11 record, earning 55 points and fifth place in the North Division. The club failed to reach the post-season.

Greg Pankewicz led the Senators with 23 goals, while Martin St. Amour had a team-high 60 points. Darrin Madeley and Mark Laforest each earned 10 wins, while Madeley led the team with a 3.32 GAA.

=== Thunder Bay Thunder Hawks ===
The Thunder Bay Thunder Hawks were coached by Bill McDonald. The Thunder Hawks finished the 1992–93 season with a 33–24–4 record, earning 70 points and third place in the league standings, qualifying for the post-season. In the playoffs, the Thunder Hawks defeated the Muskegon Fury in the first round, however, the team lost in the round-robin qualifiers with a 1–3 record against the Brantford Smoke and St. Thomas Wildcats.

Jason Firth led the team with 36 goals and 100 points, finishing fourth in the league in points. In 11 playoff games, Firth scored a team-high eight goals and 17 points. Mark Michaud led the Thunder Hawks with 12 wins and had a team best 3.84 GAA.

== See also ==
- 1992–93 NHL season

== Bibliography ==
- Finnigan, Joan (1992). Old Scores, New Goals: The Story of the Ottawa Senators.
- Diamond, Dan; Dinger, Ralph; Duplacey, James; Zweig, Eric, eds. (1998). Total Hockey. ISBN 0-8362-7114-9.
- Garrioch, Bruce (1998). "Ottawa Senators 1992–93 to Date". In Diamond, Dan; Dinger, Ralph; Duplacey, James; Zweig, Eric (eds.). Total Hockey. ISBN 0-8362-7114-9.
- Laroche, Stephen (2014). Changing the Game: A History of NHL Expansion. Toronto: ECW Press. ISBN 978-1-77041-079-4.
- MacGregor, Roy (1993). Road Games: A Year in the Life of the NHL. Toronto: MacFarlane Walter & Ross. ISBN 0-921912-70-6.
- National Hockey League Guide & Record Book 2007.
