= Kent Paynter =

Canadian former ice hockey player (born 1965)

- Born: April 27, 1965 (age 61) Summerside, Prince Edward Island, Canada
- Height: 6 ft 0 in (183 cm)
- Weight: 185 lb (84 kg; 13 st 3 lb)
- Position: Defence
- Shot: Left
- Played for: Chicago Blackhawks; Washington Capitals; Winnipeg Jets; Ottawa Senators
- NHL draft: 159th overall, 1983; Chicago Blackhawks
- Playing career: 1985–1998

Kent Douglas Paynter (born April 27, 1965) is a Canadian former ice hockey player. Paynter played as a defenceman in the National Hockey League (NHL) from 1985 to 1994 with the Chicago Black Hawks, Washington Capitals, Winnipeg Jets and Ottawa Senators. He finished his professional career in the minor leagues in 1998.

== Playing career ==
=== Amateur ===
==== Kitchener Rangers (1982–1985) ====
Paynter joined the Kitchener Rangers of the Ontario Hockey League (OHL) in 1982–83 after he was drafted by the club in the third round, 44th overall, during the 1982 OHL Priority Selection. In his first season with the Rangers, Paynter scored four goals and 15 points in 65 games, helping Kitchener finish second in the Emms Division. In the post-season, Paynter scored one goal in twelve games.

Paynter returned to the Rangers in the 1983–84 season, in which he saw his offensive production improve. In 65 games, Paynter scored nine goals and 36 points, finishing third among Rangers defencemen in points. In the playoffs, Paynter scored four goals and 13 points in 16 games as the Rangers lost to the Ottawa 67's in the J. Ross Robertson Cup final. As Kitchener hosted the 1984 Memorial Cup, the Rangers were invited to the tournament as the host team. At the tournament, Paynter had three assists in four games. Kitchener once again fell short of the championship, as they lost 7–2 to the 67's in the final game.

Paynter came back to Kitchener for a third season in 1984–85 and was named an alternate captain of the Rangers. On November 2, 1984, in a game against the Hamilton Steelhawks, Paynter received a match penalty for an illegal hit on Steelhawks' forward Mike Ware. He was then suspended for eight games by the OHL. However, as the only returning regular defenceman from the previous season, he helped the rebuilding club reach the post-season, as Paynter scored seven goals and 35 points in 58 games. In four playoff games, Paynter scored two goals and three points.

=== Professional ===
==== Chicago Blackhawks (1983–1989) ====
Paynter was selected by the Chicago Black Hawks of the National Hockey League (NHL) in the eighth round, 159th overall, in the 1983 NHL entry draft. In his first professional season in 1985–86, Paynter split his time between the Nova Scotia Oilers of the American Hockey League (AHL) and the Saginaw Generals of the International Hockey League (IHL). In 23 games with the Oilers, Paynter had a goal and three points, while in four games with the Generals, Paynter earned an assist.

In 1986–87, Paynter spent the entire season with the Nova Scotia Oilers, scoring two goals and eight points in 66 games with the team. In two playoff games, Paynter was held off the score sheet. During the 1987–88 season, Paynter spent a majority of it with the Saginaw Hawks of the IHL, scoring eight goals and 28 points in 74 games. In ten playoff games, Paynter earned an assist. Paynter also spent a short amount of time with the Blackhawks during the 1987–88 season. Paynter was recalled by Chicago in a roster shakeup after a 12–0 loss to the Detroit Red Wings in December. Replacing defenceman Dave Manson, Paynter made his made his NHL debut on December 5, 1987. He was held scoreless in a 7–3 loss to the Boston Bruins, while taking a two-minute tripping penalty in the first period. The Bruins scored on the ensuing power play. Paynter played in the next game, a 6–2 loss to the Buffalo Sabres on December 9, before being returned to Saginaw on December 11.

The 1988–89 season was mostly spent in the IHL with the Saginaw Hawks. In 69 games, Paynter had 12 goals and 28 points, while accumulating 148 penalty minutes. In six playoff games, Paynter had two goals and four points. His performance in Saginaw saw him get a recall during the 1988–89 season. The Blackhawks brought him up on December 27 along with forward Steve Ludzik. Paynter dressed for the December 28, 1988 game, 4–3 win over the Minnesota North Stars but did not play. He made his season debut on December 31 against the New York Rangers after Doug Wilson suffered a shoulder injury that kept him out of the lineup. Following the 1988–89 season, Paynter became a free agent.

==== Washington Capitals (1989–1991) ====
On August 21, 1989, Paynter signed with the Washington Capitals. Paynter spent most of the 1989–90 season with the Baltimore Skipjacks of the AHL. In 60 games, he scored seven goals and 27 points, and in 11 playoff games, Paynter scored five goals and 11 points. He was recalled on January 7, 1990 and on January 8, Paynter appeared in his first game with the Capitals. He did not earn a point in an 8–6 loss to the Toronto Maple Leafs. On January 16, Paynter earned his first NHL point, an assist on Dino Ciccarelli's goal in the first period, in a 9–6 victory over the New Jersey Devils. On January 31, Paynter scored his first, and only, NHL goal, against goaltender Daniel Berthiaume of the Minnesota North Stars in a 4–3 win. In 13 games with the Capitals, Paynter had a goal and three points. On May 5, Paynter played in his first career NHL playoff game during the semifinals of the 1990 Stanley Cup playoffs, replacing Neil Sheehy. Paynter earned ten penalty minutes in a 3–0 loss to the Boston Bruins, taking part in a melee with Bruins players late in the third period that resulted in five players from each team being put in the penalty box. In three playoff games, Paynter was held off the score sheet.

Paynter returned to Baltimore for the 1990–91 season, scoring ten goals and 27 points in 43 games. On December 7, 1990, Paynter took a shot off his ankle during a match with the Hershey Bears. He did not finish the game and returned on January 22, 1991, only to reinjure the same ankle in his first game back. Paynter returned to action in February with the Skipjacks. In the playoffs with the Skipjacks, Paynter had two goals and three points. Paynter was recalled by the Capitals during the 1990–91 season on February 24 to replace an injured Rod Langway. He made his season debut in a 5–1 loss the New Jersey Devils on February 25. Paynter joined the Capitals for a single playoff game after defencemen Mikhail Tatarinov and Al Iafrate were unable to play. He made his single 1991 Stanley Cup playoffs appearance on April 3 earning no points in a 2–1 loss to the New York Rangers. On May 21, 1991, Paynter, and forwards Tyler Larter, and Bob Joyce were traded to the Winnipeg Jets for Craig Duncanson, Brent Hughes, and Simon Wheeldon.

==== Winnipeg Jets (1991–1992) ====
Paynter joined the Jets for the 1991–92 season. He began the season with the Jets as the status of defenceman Moe Mantha was uncertain, but did not make an appearance. However, when Mantha returned to the Jets in mid-October, Paynter was assigned to the Moncton Hawks of the AHL. He spent the majority of the 1991–92 season with Moncton, scoring three goals and 33 points in 62 games. In 11 playoff games, Paynter scored two goals and eight points. Paynter was recalled on November 21, 1991, after a season-ending injury to defenceman Dean Kennedy. He played in his first game with Winnipeg on November 25, earning no points in a 3–3 tie against the Calgary Flames. However, a clearing shot by Paynter hit his teammate Darrin Shannon and knocked Shannon out of the game. He was returned to Moncton on November 27 after Mantha returned from injury. He was recalled again on December 20 and appeared in four more games with Winnipeg, recording no points, before being returned to Moncton on December 31. Paynter was left unprotected in the 1992 NHL expansion draft by the Jets and was claimed by the Ottawa Senators on June 18, 1992.

==== Ottawa Senators (1992–1994) ====
Paynter spent a majority of the 1992–93 season with the New Haven Senators of the AHL, scoring seven goals and 24 points in 48 games. He was recalled along with forward Blair Atcheynum on January 19 and appeared in his first game with Ottawa that night, earning no points in a 5–2 loss to the Quebec Nordiques. On February 9, Paynter earned 12 penalty minutes in an 8–1 loss to the Philadelphia Flyers. In six games with Ottawa, Paynter had no points and 20 penalty minutes. He also missed three games with Ottawa due to a charley horse. He was returned to New Haven on February 11.

Paynter saw most of his playing time with the Prince Edward Island Senators of the AHL during the 1993–94 season, scoring six goals and 26 points in 63 games. He was recalled after the Senators suffered a series of injuries. Paynter made his NHL season debut on January 3, 1994, in a 4–1 loss to the Pittsburgh Penguins. He was returned to the AHL on January 9 but was recalled again on March 3. On March 5, Paynter recorded his first point with the Senators, an assist on Dave McLlwain's second period power play goal, in a 6–1 loss to the Boston Bruins. In nine games with Ottawa, Paynter had an assist. At the end of the season, Paynter became an unrestricted free agent.

==== Milwaukee Admirals (1994–1998) ====
Paynter signed with the Milwaukee Admirals of the IHL on a multi-year contract ahead the 1994–95 season in June 1994. In 73 games, he scored three goals and 25 points. In five playoff games, Paynter had two goals and five points. He returned to the club for the 1995–96 season. Paynter scored nine goals and 28 points in 79 games, then added two assists in five playoff games for the Admirals. Paynter signed a new contract with Milwaukee in August 1996 and spent a third season with the Admirals during 1996–97 season. In 77 games, he scored 10 goals and 38 points. In three playoff games, Paynter had a goal and an assist. He began the 1997–98 season in Milwaukee, registering six assists in 15 games. On December 11, 1997, Paynter was traded to the Indianapolis Ice with defenceman Len Esau for forward Martin Gendron and defenceman Marc Hussey.

==== Indianapolis Ice (1997–1998) ====
Paynter finished the 1997–98 season with the Indianapolis Ice. In 37 games, Paynter had three goals and 10 points. In five playoff games, he earned an assist. Following the season, Paynter announced his retirement.

== Personal life ==
After his retirement from playing, Paynter briefly became an assistant coach and then head coach of the Summerside Western Capitals of the Maritime Junior Hockey League in late 1998, after replacing the fired Jeff Squires. He finished the season with a record of 5 wins, 38 losses, two ties and two overtime losses in 58 games. He became a local businessman in Prince Edward Island.

== Career statistics ==
			Regular season					Playoffs
Season	Team	League	GP	G	A	Pts	PIM	GP	G	A	Pts	PIM
1981–82	Summerside Western Capitals	IJHL	35	7	23	30	65	—	—	—	—	—
1982–83	Kitchener Rangers	OHL	65	4	11	15	97	12	1	0	1	20
1983–84	Kitchener Rangers	OHL	65	9	27	36	94	16	4	9	13	18
1984–85	Kitchener Rangers	OHL	58	7	28	35	93	4	2	1	3	4
1985–86	Nova Scotia Oilers	AHL	23	1	2	3	36	—	—	—	—	—
1985–86	Saginaw Generals	IHL	4	0	1	1	2	—	—	—	—	—
1986–87	Nova Scotia Oilers	AHL	66	2	6	8	57	2	0	0	0	0
1987–88	Chicago Blackhawks	NHL	2	0	0	0	2	—	—	—	—	—
1987–88	Saginaw Hawks	IHL	74	8	20	28	141	10	0	1	1	30
1988–89	Chicago Blackhawks	NHL	1	0	0	0	2	—	—	—	—	—
1988–89	Saginaw Hawks	IHL	69	12	14	26	148	6	2	2	4	17
1989–90	Washington Capitals	NHL	13	1	2	3	18	3	0	0	0	10
1989–90	Baltimore Skipjacks	AHL	60	7	20	27	110	11	5	6	11	34
1990–91	Washington Capitals	NHL	1	0	0	0	15	1	0	0	0	0
1990–91	Baltimore Skipjacks	AHL	43	10	17	27	64	6	2	1	3	8
1991–92	Winnipeg Jets	NHL	5	0	0	0	4	—	—	—	—	—
1991–92	Moncton Hawks	AHL	62	3	30	33	71	11	2	6	8	25
1992–93	Ottawa Senators	NHL	6	0	0	0	20	—	—	—	—	—
1992–93	New Haven Senators	AHL	48	7	17	24	81	—	—	—	—	—
1993–94	Ottawa Senators	NHL	9	0	1	1	8	—	—	—	—	—
1993–94	Prince Edward Island Senators	AHL	63	6	20	26	125	—	—	—	—	—
1994–95	Milwaukee Admirals	IHL	73	3	22	25	104	5	2	3	5	8
1995–96	Milwaukee Admirals	IHL	79	9	19	28	147	5	0	2	2	10
1996–97	Milwaukee Admirals	IHL	77	10	28	38	97	3	1	1	2	4
1997–98	Milwaukee Admirals	IHL	15	0	6	6	14	—	—	—	—	—
1997–98	Indianapolis Ice	IHL	37	3	7	10	36	5	0	1	1	4
NHL totals			37	1	3	4	69	4	0	0	0	10
AHL totals			365	36	112	148	544	30	9	13	22	67
IHL totals			428	45	117	162	689	34	5	10	15	73
