= Darren Rumble =

Canadian ice hockey player and coach

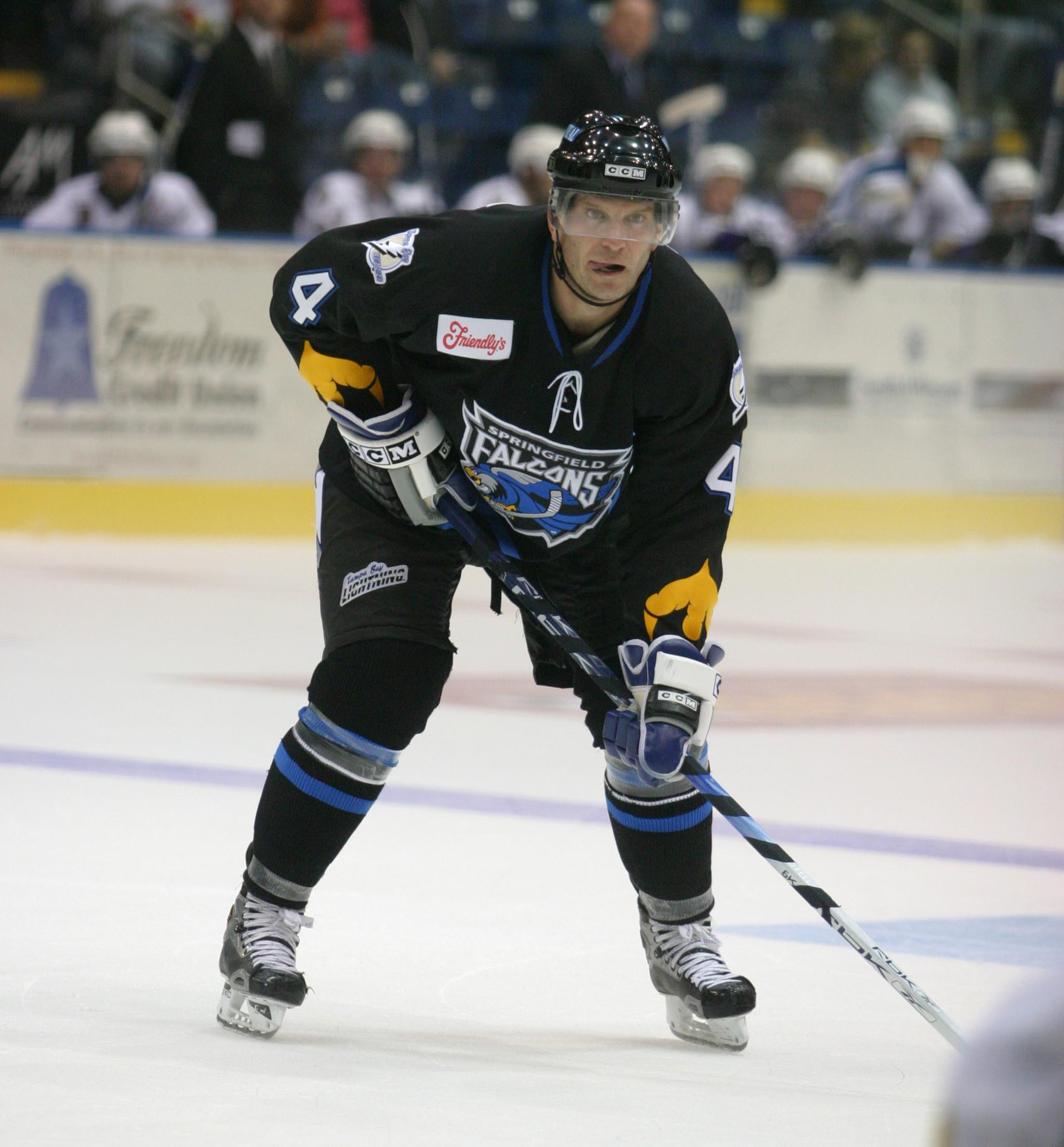
- Rumble with the Springfield Falcons in 2004
- Born: January 23, 1969 (age 57) Barrie, Ontario, Canada
- Height: 6 ft 1 in (185 cm)
- Weight: 210 lb (95 kg; 15 st 0 lb)
- Position: Defence
- Shot: Left
- Played for: Philadelphia Flyers; Ottawa Senators; St. Louis Blues; Tampa Bay Lightning
- NHL draft: 20th overall, 1987; Philadelphia Flyers
- Playing career: 1989–2005

Darren William Rumble (born January 23, 1969) is a Canadian professional ice hockey coach and former professional ice hockey player. Rumble played for the Philadelphia Flyers, Ottawa Senators, St. Louis Blues and Tampa Bay Lightning of the National Hockey League (NHL), but played most of his career with various minor league teams, winning the Eddie Shore Award as the American Hockey League (AHL)'s best defenceman in 1997. He won the Stanley Cup with the Lightning in 2004. After retiring later that year, Rumble became an assistant coach with the Springfield Falcons of the AHL. He became head coach of the Norfolk Admirals of the AHL in 2008, holding the position until January 2010. He then took up various coaching positions in the minor leagues. He has served as head coach of the Moncton Wildcats of the Quebec Major Junior Hockey League and the Owen Sound Attack of the Ontario Hockey League.

== Playing career ==
=== Junior hockey ===
As a youth, Rumble played in the 1982 Quebec International Pee-Wee Hockey Tournament with a minor ice hockey team from Barrie. Rumble was selected 9th overall by the Kitchener Rangers of the Ontario Hockey League (OHL) in the 1986 OHL Priority Draft. He played three seasons of major junior hockey with the Kitchener Rangers and was named to the OHL First All-Star Team in his final OHL season in 1988–89.

=== Professional ===
Rumble was selected 20th overall by the Philadelphia Flyers of the National Hockey League (NHL) in the 1987 NHL entry draft by general manager (GM) Bobby Clarke. Going into the draft, he was among the top prospects available, and the fifth highest defenceman. Rumble turned professional with the Hershey Bears, the American Hockey League (AHL) affiliate of the Flyers in 1989–90. He played three seasons with the Bears Rumble was recalled by Philadelphia on November 26, 1990 along with Scott Sandelin after defenceman Jeff Chychrun suffered a broken wrist. He made his NHL debut on November 27 in a 5–1 victory over the New York Islanders. In the next game on November 29, a 5–5 tie with the New Jersey Devils, Rumble scored on goaltender Sean Burke for his first NHL goal and point. He played in one more game with Philadelphia, a 5–1 victory over the New York Rangers on November 30, before being returned to Hershey. Flyers GM Clarke was fired in 1990 and the new GM, Russ Farwell, did not have Rumble in his plans. Rumble was Hershey's top scoring defenceman in 1991–92.

The Flyers chose to leave Rumble unprotected in the 1992 NHL expansion draft on June 18, 1992 and he was selected by the Ottawa Senators. One of several former first round draft selections chosen by the Senators, Rumble was considered a future cornerstone by the new franchise. Rumble made the Senators out of training camp and played in the team's first ever win in the 1992–93 season, a 5–2 victory over the Montreal Canadiens on October 8, 1992, assisting on Sylvain Turgeon's game-winning goal. Rumble scored his first goal for the Senators on January 23, 1993 in a 6–4 loss to the Washington Capitals. He had a brief conditioning stint with the New Haven Senators of the AHL in November, but after two games, was back up with Ottawa. Among those considered a future cornerstone, Rumble showed the greatest promise throughout the rough first season, and was re-signed by the Senators in September 1993. However, after suffering through the 1993–94 season in which the Senators were only marginally better, Rumble almost quit hockey. Rumble did, however, break a 137-minute Senators scoreless streak and helped break a 12-game winless streak when he scored on Arturs Irbe in the first period of a 5–4 victory over the San Jose Sharks on February 24, 1994. The following season Rumble was made available in the waiver draft on January 18, 1995 by the Senators, but went unclaimed. He spent the lockout-shortened 1994–95 season with Ottawa's AHL affiliate, the Prince Edward Island Senators, where he earned an AHL Second Team All-Star berth. Prince Edward Island won the Atlantic Division and the team were eliminated in the second round of the Calder Cup playoffs.

Rumble returned to the Flyers organization as a free agent for the 1995–96 season and competed with Jason Bowen and Aris Brimanis for the final spot on the Flyers' defence. He was assigned to Hershey to start the season. Rumble was recalled on November 2, 1995 and made his Flyers season debut that night in a 2–1 loss to the Florida Panthers. Rumble got into four more NHL games with the Flyers, going scoreless. In the 1996–97 season, the Flyers changed their AHL affiliate to the Philadelphia Phantoms and it was with them that Rumble starred. He was named an AHL First Team All-Star and awarded the Eddie Shore Award as the league's best defenceman. He played ten games with the Flyers that season, going scoreless making his NHL season debut on January 2, 1997 in a 4–1 over the San Jose Sharks.

In 1997, a free agent at the end of the season he left North America to play one season for the Adler Mannheim in the Deutsche Eishockey Liga. He returned to North America and signed with the San Antonio Dragons of the International Hockey League (IHL). Rumble scored his first two goals for the Dragons on December 13, 1997 in a 5–2 win over the Utah Grizzlies. He had a multi-point game in a 5–4 win over the Las Vegas Thunder on January 30, 1998. In the offseason, Rumble was sent by the Dragons as future considerations to the Grand Rapids Griffins to complete a previous trade. Rumble began the 1998–99 season with the Griffins. On March 9, 1999, Rumble was traded by the Griffins to the Utah Grizzlies for forward Yan Kaminsky. Rumble began the 1999–2000 season with the Griffins. However, on December 16, 1999, he was loaned to the Worcester IceCats of the AHL, where he finished the season. In the 2000–01 season Rumble played with Worcester in the AHL, but saw 12 games of NHL action with the St. Louis Blues. He made his NHL debut for the Blues on February 6, 2001 in a 2–2 tie with the Columbus Blue Jackets. In the next game, a 4–1 win over the Tampa Bay Lightning on February 8, Rumble registered his first point with the Blues. He assisted on Alexander Khavanov's power play goal in the second period. Rumble was suspended for two games for an illegal hit on forward Mark Smith in a 7–2 victory over the San Jose Sharks on February 26. Rumble spent the entire 2001–02 season in the AHL with Worcester.

The Tampa Bay Lightning signed Rumble to a one-year contract in September 2002. He split time between the Springfield Falcons of the AHL and Tampa. He made 19 appearances with Tampa in the 2002–03 season, going scoreless. He made his Lightning debut on December 8, 2002 in a 3–1 loss to the Chicago Blackhawks. He re-signed with the Lightning to a one-year contract in the offseason. He split the 2003–04 season between Tampa and the Hershey Bears of the AHL. Rumble made his NHL season debut on October 21, 2003 in a 2–1 victory over the Atlanta Thrashers. He appeared in five games with Tampa that season, going scoreless. His last appearance in an NHL game took place on December 13, 2003 in a 5–2 loss to the Montreal Canadiens. The Lightning went on to win the Stanley Cup at the end of the season and Rumble, as a "Black Ace" for the Lightning during the Cup run, had his name inscribed on the Cup. Rumble returned to Springfield the following season, but played only ten games before announcing his retirement as a player and his new job as an assistant coach of the team on December 18, 2004.

== Coaching career ==
Rumble joined the Springfield Falcons as an assistant coach in December 2004. In 2006, he was temporarily promoted to assistant coach of the Tampa Bay Lightning under John Tortorella while Craig Ramsey recovered from cancer. In 2007, the Norfolk Admirals of the AHL became Tampa Bay's new affiliate and Rumble and coach Steve Stirling were re-assigned to the Admirals. In July 2008, the Lightning named Rumble head coach of the Admirals, replacing Stirling. On January 17, 2010, he was fired by the Lightning after going 50–60–11.

Rumble was hired as assistant coach with the Lewiston Maineiacs of the Quebec Major Junior Hockey League (QMJHL) for one season before becoming an assistant coach to Steve Konowalchuk of the Seattle Thunderbirds of the Western Hockey League (WHL). He spent two years in the WHL until July 2013, when he was named head coach of the Moncton Wildcats of the QMJHL. He coached Moncton for most of six seasons before being fired on January 7, 2019. During his tenure with the Wildcats, he led the team to two playoff semifinals. However, it was announced on January 22 that he was hired as an assistant coach of the Saginaw Spirit of the OHL for the remainder of the season.

In 2017, Rumble was named the head coach of Canada's under-18 team at the IIHF Under-18 World Hockey Championships.

Rumble returned to the QMJHL, joining the Shawinigan Cataractes as an assistant coach under Gordie Dwyer for the 2019–20 season. He was then signed by the Gatineau Olympiques as an assistant coach for the 2020–21 season. He remained with the Olympiques until the end of the 2022–23 season.

On October 18, 2023, he was named the interim head coach of the Owen Sound Attack of the OHL, where he had been serving since July as an assistant coach, before the replacement of previous coach Greg Walters on October 16. and was relieved of his duties, along with assistant coach Sean Teakle, on May 2, 2024.

== Career statistics ==
			Regular season					Playoffs
Season	Team	League	GP	G	A	Pts	PIM	GP	G	A	Pts	PIM
1985–86	Barrie Colts	CJHL	46	14	32	46	91	—	—	—	—	—
1986–87	Kitchener Rangers	OHL	64	11	32	43	44	4	0	1	1	9
1987–88	Kitchener Rangers	OHL	55	15	50	65	64	—	—	—	—	—
1988–89	Kitchener Rangers	OHL	46	11	29	40	25	5	1	0	1	2
1989–90	Hershey Bears	AHL	57	2	13	15	31	—	—	—	—	—
1990–91	Hershey Bears	AHL	73	6	35	41	48	3	0	5	5	2
1990–91	Philadelphia Flyers	NHL	3	1	0	1	0	—	—	—	—	—
1991–92	Hershey Bears	AHL	79	12	54	66	118	6	0	3	3	2
1992–93	New Haven Senators	AHL	2	1	0	1	0	—	—	—	—	—
1992–93	Ottawa Senators	NHL	69	3	13	16	61	—	—	—	—	—
1993–94	PEI Senators	AHL	3	2	0	2	0	—	—	—	—	—
1993–94	Ottawa Senators	NHL	70	6	9	15	116	—	—	—	—	—
1994–95	PEI Senators	AHL	70	7	46	53	77	11	0	6	6	4
1995–96	Hershey Bears	AHL	58	13	37	50	83	5	0	0	0	6
1995–96	Philadelphia Flyers	NHL	5	0	0	0	4	—	—	—	—	—
1996–97	Philadelphia Phantoms	AHL	72	18	44	62	83	7	0	3	3	19
1996–97	Philadelphia Flyers	NHL	10	0	0	0	0	—	—	—	—	—
1997–98	Adler Mannheim	DEL	21	2	7	9	18	—	—	—	—	—
1997–98	San Antonio Dragons	IHL	46	7	22	29	47	—	—	—	—	—
1998–99	Grand Rapids Griffins	IHL	53	6	22	28	44	—	—	—	—	—
1998–99	Utah Grizzlies	IHL	10	1	4	5	10	—	—	—	—	—
1999–2000	Grand Rapids Griffins	IHL	29	3	10	13	20	—	—	—	—	—
1999–2000	Worcester IceCats	AHL	39	0	17	17	31	9	0	2	2	6
2000–01	Worcester IceCats	AHL	53	6	24	30	65	8	0	1	1	10
2000–01	St. Louis Blues	NHL	12	0	4	4	27	—	—	—	—	—
2001–02	Worcester IceCats	AHL	60	3	29	32	48	3	0	4	4	2
2002–03	Springfield Falcons	AHL	33	5	17	22	18	—	—	—	—	—
2002–03	Tampa Bay Lightning	NHL	19	0	0	0	6	—	—	—	—	—
2003–04	Hershey Bears	AHL	5	2	0	2	6	—	—	—	—	—
2003–04	Tampa Bay Lightning	NHL	5	0	0	0	2	—	—	—	—	—
2004–05	Springfield Falcons	AHL	10	0	1	1	4	—	—	—	—	—
AHL totals			614	77	317	394	612	52	0	24	24	51
NHL totals			193	10	26	36	216	—	—	—	—	—
IHL totals			138	17	58	75	121	—	—	—	—	—

== Awards ==
- 1997 - Eddie Shore Award - AHL top defenceman

== Citations ==
Preceded by Kerry Huffman	Philadelphia Flyers' first-round draft pick 1987	Succeeded by Claude Boivin
