= Jeff Lazaro =

American ice hockey player (born 1968)

- Born: March 21, 1968 (age 58) Waltham, Massachusetts, U.S.
- Height: 5 ft 9 in (175 cm)
- Weight: 182 lb (83 kg; 13 st 0 lb)
- Position: Right wing
- Shot: Left
- Played for: Ottawa Senators; Boston Bruins
- National team: United States
- NHL draft: Undrafted
- Playing career: 1990–2002

Jeffrey Adam Lazaro (born March 21, 1968) is an American former professional ice hockey player. He played in the National Hockey League with the Boston Bruins and Ottawa Senators from 1990 to 1993. The rest of his professional career was spent in the minor leagues in North America and Europe. Internationally, he competed for the United States at the 1994 Winter Olympics.

== Biography ==
=== Amateur ===
As a youth, Lazaro played in the 1981 Quebec International Pee-Wee Hockey Tournament with the Boston Braves minor ice hockey team. He played his final year of junior hockey Waltham High School in Waltham, Massachusetts. He then joined the University of New Hampshire's Wildcats program for the 1986–87 season. He played three seasons with the Wildcats as a defenseman, however, his small stature and his best skill, his speed, was not showcased often when defending. While attending a private hockey camp, he was convinced to change his position to winger in order to take advantage of his abilities and his tenacity chasing the puck. He played his final season with the Wildcats as a left winger and earned the teams' unsung hero award after scoring a career-high 16 goals.

=== Professional ===
==== Boston Bruins ====
Lazaro went undrafted by National Hockey League (NHL) teams. He was invited to the Boston Bruins training camp in September 1990. After impressing the Bruins during training camp, Lazaro was signed as a free agent. On September 25, Lazaro was assigned Boston's American Hockey League (AHL) affiliate, the Maine Mariners. In 26 games with Maine, he scored eight goals and 11 assists for 19 points. He was recalled on December 10 after the severity of forward Bob Carpenter's knee injury was revealed to require surgery. He made his NHL debut for the Bruins on December 12 against the Hartford Whalers in a 5–1 victory, playing on a line with Dave Poulin and Dave Christian. He scored his first NHL goal against goaltender Daryl Reaugh in the third period of the following game on December 13, an 8–2 victory over the Whalers. By January 1991, he was featuring on the top penalty kill unit alongside Bob Sweeney. He registered his first multi-point game on January 31 when he registered two assists, assisting on Ken Hodge Jr.'s opening goal and later Cam Neely's third period goal in a 5–2 victory over the Montreal Canadiens. He played in 49 games with the Bruins, scoring five goals and 13 assists for 18 points.

The Bruins made the 1991 Stanley Cup playoffs and Lazaro made his playoff debut in the first game of the first round series against the Hartford Whalers on April 3, scoring a goal on Peter Sidorkiewicz in the 5–2 loss. He added another goal in the series, which the Bruins won in six games. In the final game, he suffered a hyperextended left knee that took him out of the game for ten minutes. In the next round versus the Montreal Canadiens, Lazaro scored his only goal of the series in game six on Patrick Roy, taking the lead in the game. Ultimately, the Bruins lost the game in overtime, 3–2, but won the series in seven games. The penalty kill, of which Lazaro was a lead part, was lauded in The Boston Globe as a key to their victory. In the third round, Boston faced the Pittsburgh Penguins, to whom they lost in six games. In 19 playoff games, he scored three goals and five points.

He began the 1991–92 season with the Bruins and registered a goal and assist in the opening game on October 5. He assisted on Stephen Leach's opening goal of the game in the first period and then put one past goaltender Glenn Healy in the third period in a 4–3 loss to the New York Islanders. On November 2, in a game against the Detroit Red Wings where an altercation with Detroit defenseman Vladimir Konstantinov at the end of the game quickly amplified into a brawl that left him at the bottom of a pile and nearly unconscious, claiming he had been choked by a Red Wings player. He was helped off the ice by officials. After a loss against the Islanders on November 4, Lazaro was one of four Bruins players assigned to the AHL. He was recalled on December 26 along with forward Wes Walz. In a game against the Montreal Canadiens on January 23, 1992, he suffered a twisted knee attempting to hit Denis Savard that kept him out of the lineup. He missed fourteen games before returning to the lineup on March 5 in a game against the Vancouver Canucks. He aggravated his knee injury after getting tangled up with Pat LaFontaine in a game against the Buffalo Sabres on March 11. He returned to the lineup on April 13 replacing Dave Poulin in the lineup in a 6–3 victory over the Hartford Whalers. He finished the regular season having played in 27 games with the Bruins, scoring three goals and nine points. In 21 games with Maine, he scored eight goals and 12 points. The Bruins made the 1992 Stanley Cup playoffs, but Lazaro was in and out of the lineup. He played nine of the Bruins' playoff games, registering just one assist in the second round series against Montreal on Jim Wiemer's game-winning goal in game 3.

==== Ottawa Senators ====
In the 1992 off season, the NHL expanded by two teams, the Ottawa Senators and the Tampa Bay Lightning. Lazaro was among the players left unprotected by Boston. He was selected by Ottawa in the 1992 NHL expansion draft with their tenth forward selection. He had off-season shoulder surgery and began the 1992–93 season with Ottawa's AHL affiliate, the New Haven Senators, to recover. On November 12, Lazaro and defenseman Dominic Lavoie were called up to join Ottawa. However, Lazaro was still recovering and did not have full range of motion in his shoulder. Coach Rick Bowness, caught off guard with the additions, thought neither of them could play on an NHL roster at that time. Lazaro made his Senators debut on November 13 in a 1–0 loss to the Tampa Bay Lightning. In the following game on November 15, he scored his first goal with the Senators on Dominic Roussel in a 7–2 loss to the Philadelphia Flyers. In a 3–2 win over the San Jose Sharks on January 10, 1993, Lazaro struck the end boards, his right leg crumpled, and required help to get off the ice. He returned from the injury on February 13 in a match against the Montreal Canadiens having missed 14 games and was then assigned to New Haven on February 18. He was recalled one more time by Ottawa on March 7, and played his final game in the NHL against the Chicago Blackhawks that night, replacing Doug Smail. He was returned to New Haven on March 9. He appeared in 26 games with Ottawa, scoring six goals and ten points and 27 games with New Haven, scoring 12 goals and 25 points.

==== Minor leagues ====
In the 1993 off-season, Lazaro was given a termination contract by the Senators. (Note: A termination contract allowed the player to seek a better position/contract with another team while still having a one-year contract with the original team for the upcoming season.) Having played on a termination contract in the previous season, Lazaro was effectively an unrestricted free agent. After spending most of the 1993–94 season with the United States national team, he signed an AHL contract with the Boston Bruins affiliate, the Providence Bruins on March 7, 1994. He played in 16 games with Providence, scoring three goals and seven points.

Lazaro went overseas to Europe for the 1994–95 season, playing in the Austrian Hockey League with EC Graz, appearing in 32 games, scoring 28 goals and 57 points. He then joined the Ratingen Lions of the Deutsche Eishockey Liga for two seasons before returning to North America for the 1997–98 season. He joined the New Orleans Brass of the ECHL, a joint affiliate of the NHL's Edmonton Oilers and Montreal Canadiens. He appeared in 70 games for the Brass, scoring 37 goals and 101 points. He appeared in the 1998 ECHL All-Star Game representing the US/World All-Stars. Lazaro was named to the 1997–98 ECHL All-Star Team at season's end. He also briefly played for the joint Canadiens/Oilers AHL affiliate, the Hamilton Bulldogs, playing in two games, scoring two goals. The Brass made the 1998 ECHL playoffs and Lazaro appeared in four games, registering four assists.

On September 3, 1998, Lazaro signed an AHL contract with the Detroit Red Wings affiliate, the Adirondack Red Wings. He played in 16 games with Adirondack to start the 1998–99 season, scoring two goals and ten points. His time with Adirondack came to an end after he was caught speeding and drunk driving by police and was assigned to New Orleans. He finished the season in New Orleans playing in 52 games, scoring 26 goals and 70 points. He spent the next three seasons with New Orleans, ending his career after the 2001–02 season.

== International play ==
Lazaro was named to the United States national team for the 1993 Men's Ice Hockey World Championships. He was added to Team USA for the 1994 Winter Olympics. He rejoined Team USA for the 1994 Men's Ice Hockey World Championships.

== Career statistics ==
=== Regular season and playoffs ===
			Regular season					Playoffs
Season	Team	League	GP	G	A	Pts	PIM	GP	G	A	Pts	PIM
1985–86	Waltham High School	HS-MA	—	—	—	—	—	—	—	—	—	—
1986–87	University of New Hampshire	HE	38	7	14	21	38	—	—	—	—	—
1987–88	University of New Hampshire	HE	30	4	13	17	48	—	—	—	—	—
1988–89	University of New Hampshire	HE	31	8	14	22	38	—	—	—	—	—
1989–90	University of New Hampshire	HE	39	16	19	35	34	—	—	—	—	—
1990–91	Boston Bruins	NHL	49	5	13	18	67	19	3	2	5	30
1990–91	Maine Mariners	AHL	26	8	11	19	18	—	—	—	—	—
1991–92	Boston Bruins	NHL	27	3	6	9	31	9	0	1	1	2
1991–92	Maine Mariners	AHL	21	8	4	12	32	—	—	—	—	—
1992–93	Ottawa Senators	NHL	26	6	4	10	16	—	—	—	—	—
1992–93	New Haven Senators	AHL	27	12	13	25	49	—	—	—	—	—
1993–94	United States National Team	Intl	43	18	25	43	57	—	—	—	—	—
1993–94	Providence Bruins	AHL	16	3	4	7	26	—	—	—	—	—
1994–95	EC Graz	AUT	43	18	25	43	57	—	—	—	—	—
1995–96	EC Ratingen	DEL	49	29	42	71	85	—	—	—	—	—
1996–97	EC Ratingen	DEL	46	15	23	38	75	—	—	—	—	—
1997–98	New Orleans Brass	ECHL	70	37	64	101	151	4	0	4	4	8
1997–98	Hamilton Bulldogs	AHL	2	2	0	2	0	8	2	3	5	2
1998–99	New Orleans Brass	ECHL	52	26	44	70	81	11	9	7	16	14
1998–99	Adirondack Red Wings	AHL	16	2	8	10	10	—	—	—	—	—
1999–00	New Orleans Brass	ECHL	70	24	56	80	109	3	1	0	1	4
2000–01	New Orleans Brass	ECHL	58	21	27	48	103	4	2	1	3	2
2001–02	New Orleans Brass	ECHL	11	4	4	8	8	—	—	—	—	—
ECHL totals			261	112	195	307	452	22	12	12	24	28
NHL totals			102	14	23	37	114	28	3	3	6	32

=== International ===
Year	Team	Event	GP	G	A	Pts	PIM
1993	United States	WC	4	2	0	2	2
1994	United States	OLY	8	2	2	4	4
1994	United States	WC	8	0	0	0	10
Senior totals			12	4	2	6	16

== Sources ==
- MacGregor, Roy (1993). Road Games: A Year in the Life of the NHL. Toronto: MacFarlane Walter & Ross. ISBN 0-921912-70-6.
