= Rob Murphy (ice hockey) =

Canadian ice hockey player (born 1969)

- Born: April 7, 1969 (age 57) Hull, Quebec, Canada
- Height: 6 ft 3 in (191 cm)
- Weight: 205 lb (93 kg; 14 st 9 lb)
- Position: Centre
- Shot: Left
- Played for: Vancouver Canucks; Ottawa Senators; Los Angeles Kings
- NHL draft: 24th overall, 1987; Vancouver Canucks
- Playing career: 1988–2003

Robert Murphy (born April 7, 1969) is a Canadian former professional ice hockey player. Murphy played parts of seven seasons in the National Hockey League (NHL) between 1987 and 1994 with the Vancouver Canucks, Ottawa Senators, and Los Angeles Kings. Selected by the Canucks in the 1987 NHL entry draft, Murphy turned professional in 1988 and spent the next five seasons playing for the Canucks and their minor International Hockey League (IHL) affiliate. He followed that by stints with the Senators and Kings, going between the NHL and IHL and the American Hockey League (AHL) until moving to the Deutsche Eishockey Liga in Germany in 1997, playing the last six years of his career there. After retiring as a player, Murphy became an ice hockey scout, eventually becoming the director of pro scouting for both the Buffalo Sabres and then the Ottawa Senators.

== Early life ==
Murphy is from Aylmer, Quebec (now a sector of Gatineau) whose father worked for the Royal Canadian Mounted Police. Fluently bilingual in English and French, Murphy studied at a French college in Montreal.

== Playing career ==
=== Junior career ===
Murphy was selected by the Trois-Rivières Draveurs of the Quebec Major Junior Hockey League (QMJHL) in the third round of the 1986 QMJHL draft. Before playing a game for the Draveurs, he was traded to the Laval Titan for center Paul Ouellette. In his first season with Laval, the 1986–87 season, Murphy scored 35 goals and 89 points in 70 games and three goals and seven points in seven games in the playoffs. He won the Michel Bergeron Trophy for top rookie forward in the QMJHL that season. He began the 1987–88 QMJHL season with the Titan, appearing in 26 games, scoring 11 goals and 36 points. However, on December 15, 1987 Murphy was traded to the Drummondville Voltigeurs for four players. He finished the season with the Voltigeurs, scoring 16 goals and 44 points in 33 games. In the 1988 QMJHL playoffs Murphy registered 4 goals and 19 points in 17 games, The Voltigeurs finished second in the league, losing to the Hull Olympiques in the playoff final. Nevertheless, both teams from the QMJHL final made the 1988 Memorial Cup. The Voltigeurs were the first team eliminated in the four-team tournament. In the 1988–89 season, Murphy only played in 26 games with the Voltigeurs, scoring 13 goals and 38 points. In four games during the playoffs, Murphy registered one goal and four points.

=== Professional career ===
==== Vancouver Canucks ====
Murphy was the first pick of the Vancouver Canucks of the National Hockey League (NHL), 24th overall, in the second round of 1987 NHL entry draft. The Washington Capitals had wanted to select him earlier in the draft but instead traded their first round selection to the Quebec Nordiques. A tall centre with toughness and a decent scoring touch, Murphy was held in very high regard by Canucks management who felt he could be the team's answer to Joel Otto, the star defensive center for the rival Calgary Flames. He attended Vancouver's 1987 training camp, but was returned to the QMJHL at the start of the season. (Note: The source states he was returned to the Laval Voisins, but the Laval team changed their name to the Laval Titan the previous season.) He was recalled by the Canucks on January 28, 1988 after the Canucks suffered a series of injuries that left them shorthanded. Murphy made his NHL debut the 1987–88 campaign, on January 29 in a 4–2 loss to the Hartford Whalers. He appeared in five games for the Canucks, going scoreless before being returned to the QMJHL for the second time that season in February.

Murphy began the 1988–89 season with Vancouver, one of three promising rookies to make the team, the others being Trevor Linden and Todd Harkins. Murphy registered his first NHL point, assisting on Brian Bradley's second period goal in a 6–5 win over the Edmonton Oilers on October 23, 1988. His achievement was overshadowed by Jari Kurri of the Oilers scoring his 400th goal in the same game. Murphy struggled to score and was moved to the left wing, where his play improved. However, concerns about his development grew. Scratched for several games, he returned to the lineup on November 13, only to injure his shoulder crashing into the boards. Diagnosed as a separated shoulder, he returned from the injury in late November and was assigned to Vancouver's affiliate in the International Hockey League (IHL), the Milwaukee Admirals, for two weeks for conditioning. He appeared in five games for the Admirals, scoring two goals and four points. However, on December 12, Murphy was released to play for Team Canada at the World Junior Championships. After the tournament he was returned to Drummondville of the QMJHL to finish the season. After finishing the season with Drummondville, Murphy returned to Milwaukee for their playoff run, scoring in double overtime in their first game of their opening round series against the Kalamazoo Wings. He appeared in 11 playoff games for Milwaukee, registering 3 goals and 8 points.

Murphy was sent to Milwaukee to begin 1989–90 season. Murphy won the Gary F. Longman Memorial Trophy as the IHL's Rookie of the Year after scoring 24 goals and 71 points in 64 games for the Admirals. He was recalled by Vancouver on February 1 due to an injury to Brian Bradley. He made his season debut in an 8–1 loss Winnipeg Jets on February 2. In the next game against the New Jersey Devils on February 4, Murphy registered his first point of the season, assisting on Ronnie Stern's goal in the third period of the 4–2 victory. Murphy scored his first NHL goal on Peter Sidorkiewicz of the Hartford Whalers, the game winner, in the third period of a 4–1 victory on February 9. He was returned to Milwaukee in March after playing in 12 games with the Canucks, scoring just the two points.

The following season, Murphy started with Vancouver, scoring his first goal of the season in the season opening 3–2 loss to the Calgary Flames. Murphy suffered a strained right knee in a collision with Shawn Cronin of the Winnipeg Jets on November 3, and missed until late November with the injury. He was then assigned to Milwaukee for conditioning. However, upon his return to the Canucks, he played in three of the next nine games and was sent down again to Milwaukee on December 27 to make room for the return of Petr Nedvěd to the lineup. Murphy struggled in Milwaukee during his demotion. He was recalled by Vancouver again in January after injuries to Steve Bozek and Dave Capuano. However, questions concerning his development and the development of other players drafted by Vancouver were used to criticize the management, namely the general manager Pat Quinn, of the Canucks. He appeared in 42 games for the Canucks that season, notching five goals and six points and played in 23 games for the Admirals, scoring 1 goal and 8 points. The Canucks made the 1991 Stanley Cup playoffs, facing the Los Angeles Kings in the first round. Murphy made his NHL playoff debut in the first game of the series, a 6–5 victory for Vancouver on April 4. He appeared in four games in the series, but was replaced by Steve Bozek in the deciding game six. The Canucks were eliminated by the Kings in six games.

For the 1991–92 season, Murphy found himself back with Milwaukee, being made surplus to the Canucks' needs after they signed free agent Ryan Walter. He played in 73 games with the Admirals, scoring 23 goals and 64 points. Murphy was recalled by Vancouver on December 4 and made his season debut that night in a 3–0 victory over the Montreal Canadiens. He registered his only point of the NHL season assisting on Ryan Walter's opening goal in a 7–5 victory over the Minnesota North Stars on December 12. He was returned to the IHL on December 20 after playing in 6 games for Vancouver once Jim Sandlak returned from injury. Murphy was selected to the IHL's 1991 All-Star Game, playing for the East Division. He appeared in five playoff games for Milwaukee, scoring three points.

==== Ottawa Senators ====
The Canucks became disappointed with Murphy's development and left him exposed in the 1992 NHL expansion draft. Murphy was selected by the Ottawa Senators as part of their draft strategy of picking young, talented players who had not succeeded with their original teams. As a member of the inaugural Senators squad, he began the season in Ottawa but was often scratched, and did not make his 1992–93 NHL season debut until October 20 in a 5–3 loss to the Toronto Maple Leafs. He registered his first point with the Senators on November 11 assisting on Jody Hull's third period goal in a 7–3 loss to the Quebec Nordiques. He was assigned to Ottawa's American Hockey League (AHL) affiliate, the New Haven Senators, on November 19 and was recalled on December 7 after a ten-game conditioning stint. After having played in 20 games with the Senators and only registering the one point, Murphy was placed on waivers on January 13, 1993, and after going unclaimed, assigned to the AHL. After Mark Osiecki was claimed on waivers by Winnipeg on February 20, Murphy was recalled from New Haven. He scored his first goal for Ottawa on March 4 against Rick Knickle in an 8–6 loss to the Los Angeles Kings. Murphy had his first multi-goal game of his career on March 13 against Andy Moog of the Boston Bruins in a 6–3 loss. Murphy set career highs by appearing in 44 games and recording 3 goals and 10 points, but again could not establish himself as an NHL regular. Murphy showed flashes of his talent at times with the Senators, but could not remain consistent.

==== Los Angeles Kings ====
Offered a termination contract (Note: A termination contract allowed the player to seek a better position/contract with another team while still having a one-year contract with the original team for the upcoming season.) by Ottawa in early July 1993, Murphy instead signed a two-year deal with the Los Angeles Kings on July 31. Murphy was assigned to the Kings' IHL affiliate, the Phoenix Roadrunners, to begin the 1993–94 season. He was recalled by the Kings on October 23, 1993, and made his NHL season debut on October 24 in a 3–2 loss to the New York Rangers. He registered his first point with the Kings in the next game on October 27 assisting on Pat Conacher's first period goal in an 8–3 loss to the Detroit Red Wings. Murphy was sent back to Phoenix on November 12. Murphy was recalled by Los Angeles on February 22, 1993 and played in his final NHL match on February 23, a 0–0 tie versus the Dallas Stars. He was returned to the Roadrunners following the game. In his first season with Phoenix, Murphy scored 23 goals and 57 points in 72 games. In 8 games with Los Angeles, he registered the one point. While preparing for his second season with Phoenix, Murphy severely injured his left knee during training and missed the entire season. He appeared in just two games with the Roadrunners during the 1994–95 IHL season, going scoreless.

==== IHL, Europe and retirement ====
Murphy was made available in the 1995 IHL expansion draft and was selected by the Fort Wayne Komets with the tenth overall pick. In his first season with the Komets in 1995–96, Murphy scored 24 goals and 76 points in 82 games. He added one goal and three points in five games in the playoffs. In his second season with the Komets in 1996–97, he appeared in only 35 games, scoring 9 goals and 25 points.

Murphy moved to Germany in 1997, signing with SB Rosenheim of the Deutsche Eishockey Liga (DEL) for one season, scoring 9 goals and 33 points in 44 games. The following season, he played for Landshut EV of the DEL registering 14 goals and 44 points in 55 games. For the 1999–2000 season, Murphy played for the Berlin Polar Bears scoring 8 goals and 26 points in 46 games. He would spend his last three seasons in the DEL with the Hannover Scorpions, before retiring in 2003.

== International play ==
Murphy was selected to represent Canada at the 1989 World Junior Championships. He played in seven games, scoring one goal. Murphy scored the one goal short-handed in the third period of the first game against Norway. Canada finished fourth in the tournament.

== Personal life ==
After his playing career was over, Murphy was employed as a professional ice hockey scout beginning in 2007, working with the Arizona Coyotes and the Ottawa Senators. He left the Senators in 2014 to become the new director of scouting for the Buffalo Sabres in 2014. Murphy was let go by the Sabres in April 2017. He was rehired by the Senators in October 2018 as a pro scout. He served as chief pro hockey scout for the Senators from September 2023 until April 2024 when he was fired by the Senators. In June 2024, Murphy was hired by the Washington Capitals to work in their pro scouting department.

== Career statistics ==
=== Regular season and playoffs ===
			Regular season					Playoffs
Season	Team	League	GP	G	A	Pts	PIM	GP	G	A	Pts	PIM
1985–86	Outaouais Frontaliers	QMAAA	41	17	33	50	47	—	—	—	—	—
1986–87	Laval Titan	QMJHL	70	35	54	89	86	14	3	4	7	15
1987–88	Vancouver Canucks	NHL	5	0	0	0	2	—	—	—	—	—
1987–88	Laval Titan	QMJHL	26	11	25	36	82	—	—	—	—	—
1987–88	Drummondville Voltigeurs	QMJHL	33	16	28	44	41	17	4	15	19	45
1988–89	Vancouver Canucks	NHL	8	0	1	1	2	—	—	—	—	—
1988–89	Drummondville Voltigeurs	QMJHL	26	13	25	38	16	4	1	3	4	20
1988–89	Milwaukee Admirals	IHL	8	4	2	6	4	11	3	5	8	34
1989–90	Vancouver Canucks	NHL	12	1	1	2	0	—	—	—	—	—
1989–90	Milwaukee Admirals	IHL	64	24	47	71	87	6	2	6	8	12
1990–91	Vancouver Canucks	NHL	42	5	1	6	90	4	0	0	0	2
1990–91	Milwaukee Admirals	IHL	23	1	7	8	48	—	—	—	—	—
1991–92	Vancouver Canucks	NHL	6	0	1	1	6	—	—	—	—	—
1991–92	Milwaukee Admirals	IHL	73	26	38	64	141	5	0	3	3	2
1992–93	Ottawa Senators	NHL	44	3	7	10	30	—	—	—	—	—
1992–93	New Haven Senators	AHL	26	8	12	20	28	—	—	—	—	—
1993–94	Los Angeles Kings	NHL	8	0	1	1	22	—	—	—	—	—
1993–94	Phoenix Roadrunners	IHL	72	23	34	57	101	—	—	—	—	—
1994–95	Phoenix Roadrunners	IHL	2	0	0	0	10	2	0	1	1	0
1995–96	Fort Wayne Komets	IHL	82	24	52	76	107	5	1	2	3	8
1996–97	Fort Wayne Komets	IHL	35	9	16	25	40	—	—	—	—	—
1997–98	Starbulls Rosenheim	DEL	44	9	24	33	68	—	—	—	—	—
1998–99	EV Landshut	DEL	52	14	30	44	77	3	0	1	1	8
1999–00	Eisbären Berlin	DEL	46	8	18	26	89	—	—	—	—	—
2000–01	Hannover Scorpions	DEL	59	9	36	45	101	6	2	2	4	6
2001–02	Hannover Scorpions	DEL	60	11	26	37	40	—	—	—	—	—
2002–03	Hannover Scorpions	DEL	51	0	15	15	69	—	—	—	—	—
2003–04	Saint-Jean Mission	QSMHL	45	5	34	39	22	17	0	4	4	10
DEL totals			312	51	149	200	444	21	4	9	13	20
NHL totals			125	9	12	21	152	4	0	0	0	2

=== International ===
Year	Team	Event	GP	G	A	Pts	PIM
1989	Canada	WJC	7	1	0	1	8
Junior totals			7	1	0	1	8
