= Radek Hamr =

Czech ice hockey player

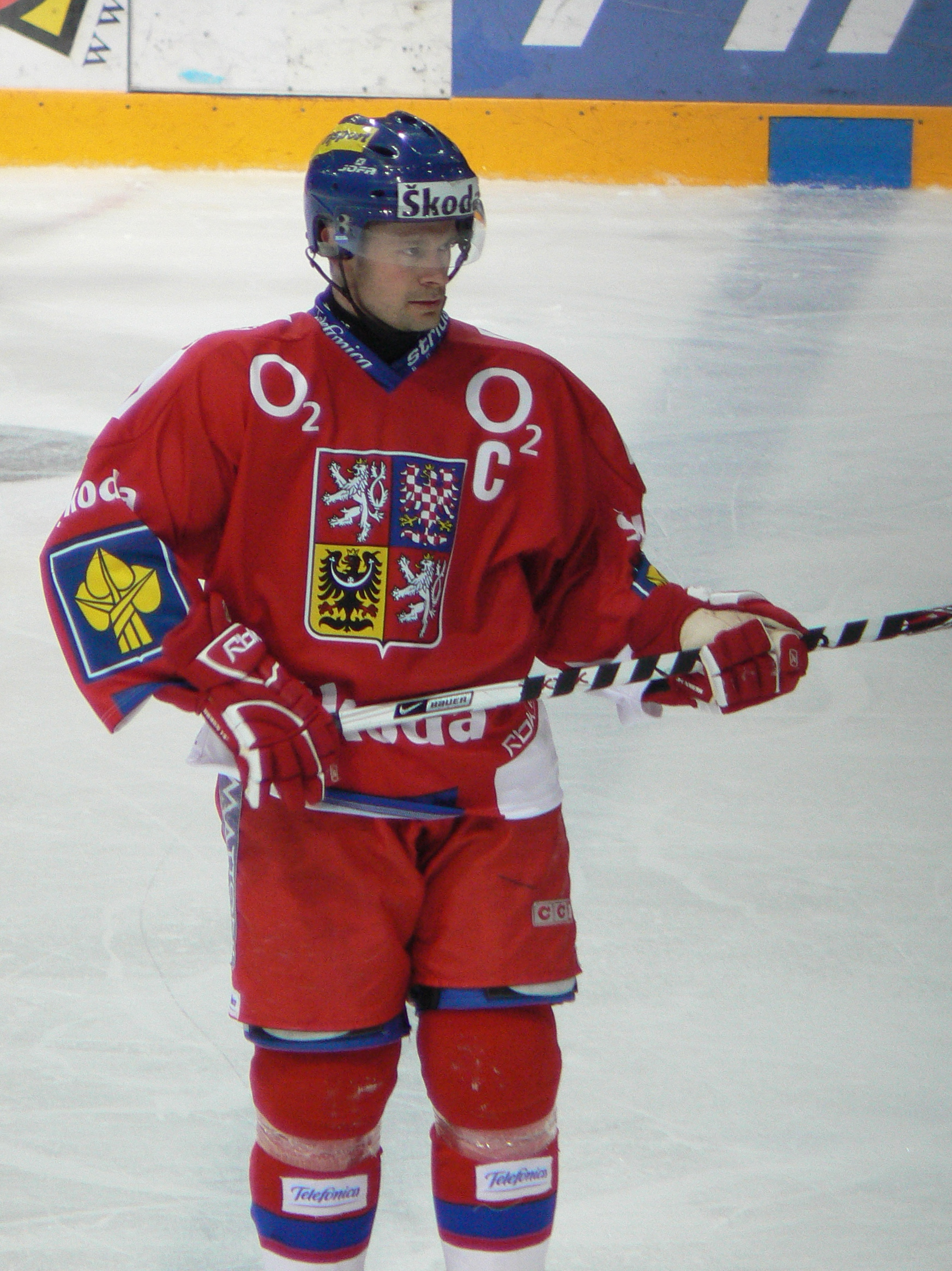
- Born: June 15, 1974 (age 51) Ústí nad Labem, Czechoslovakia
- Height: 5 ft 11 in (180 cm)
- Weight: 190 lb (86 kg; 13 st 8 lb)
- Position: Defence
- Shot: Left
- Played for: Kloten Flyers; Färjestad BK; Sparta Praha; Frölunda HC; Ottawa Senators
- National team: Czech Republic
- NHL draft: 73rd overall, 1992; Ottawa Senators
- Playing career: 1991–2010

Radek Hamr (born June 15, 1974) is a Czech ice hockey agent and former professional player, who had a short career in the National Hockey League, playing 11 games with the Ottawa Senators between 1992 and 1994. He subsequently played hockey in the national leagues of Sweden, the Czech Republic, and Switzerland until retiring in 2010.

== Playing career ==
=== Ottawa Senators (1992-1995) ===
Hamr was drafted by the Ottawa Senators in the fourth round, 73rd overall, in the 1992 NHL entry draft.

He spent most of his first professional season with the New Haven Senators of the AHL in 1992-93, scoring four goals and 25 points in 59 games. He earned a late-season call-up to the NHL, and at the age of 18, Hamr played in his first career NHL game. His first game was on April 3, 1993, as Hamr was held pointless in a 7-3 loss to the Hartford Whalers. Overall, he appeared in four games with Ottawa, getting no points and finishing with a -4 rating.

Hamr played in 69 games with the Senators AHL affiliate in 1993-94, the P.E.I. Senators, as he led the blueline with 10 goals and 36 points. Hamr earned a mid-season call-up to Ottawa, as he played in seven games, did not earn a point, and had a -10 rating.

In 1994-95, Hamr appeared in only seven games with P.E.I., earning an assist. He spent the majority of the season with the Fort Wayne Komets of the IHL, where in 58 games, Hamr had three goals and 16 points.

=== HC Sparta Praha (1995-1997) ===
Hamr returned to the Czech Republic in 1995 and signed with HC Sparta Praha of the Czech Extraliga. In his first season with the club in 1995-96, Hamr appeared in 30 games, scoring two goals and five points. In five playoff games, Hamr had an assist.

He returned to HC Sparta Praha for the 1996-97, and had a breakout season offensively, as Hamr had 12 goals and 35 points in 52 games. In 10 post-season games, Hamr had two goals and seven points.

=== Frölunda HC (1997-1999) ===
Hamr joined Frölunda HC of the SEL in 1997-98, playing in 46 games, scoring two goals and 14 points. In seven playoff games, Hamr had a goal and three points, as Frölunda lost in the semi-final.

He began the 1998-99 season with Frölunda, where in nine games, Hamr had no points. Hamr was traded to Färjestad BK for Kristian Huselius.

=== Färjestad BK (1998-2001) ===
Hamr finished the 1998–99 season with Färjestad BK, as he scored six goals and 17 points in 38 games, helping the club finish in second place in the league. In the playoffs, Hamr had a goal in four games, as Färjestad was upset by Malmö IF in the first round of the playoffs.

In 1999–2000, Hamr finished tied for first among defensemen on the club in points, as he had seven goals and 21 points in 50 games, helping Färjestad into the playoffs. In seven games, Hamr was limited to an assist, as the team lost in the first round.

Hamr continued to improve offensively in 2000–01, as he scored 13 goals and 25 points in 50 games, as Färjestad finished in second place in the league. In the post-season, Hamr had four goals and 10 points in 16 games, as Färjestad lost to Djurgårdens IF in the final.

=== HC Sparta Praha (2001-2002) ===
Hamr returned to HC Sparta Praha of the Czech Extraliga in 2001-02. In an injury-plagued season, Hamr had four goals and 10 points in 23 games with the club. In the playoffs, Hamr had six assists in 13 games, as Sparta Praha won the championship.

=== Färjestad BK (2002-2006) ===
Following his one season in the Czech Republic, Hamr rejoined Färjestad BK in 2002–03, as Hamr had seven goals and 26 points in 49 games. In the playoffs, he had two goals and five points in 14 games, as Färjestad lost in the finals to Frölunda HC.

Hamr had another productive season in 2003–04, as he scored 11 goals and 26 points in 44 games, helping Färjestad into the post-season once again. In 17 playoff games, Hamr had a goal and four points, as Färjestad lost to HV71 in seven games in the final round.

In 2004–05, Hamr struggled offensively, scoring three goals and 14 points in 47 games, his lowest totals in Sweden since his first season in 1997-98. In the playoffs, Hamr had three goals and four points in 14 games, as Färjestad lost in the final round for the third consecutive season, this time to Frölunda HC for the second time in three seasons.

Hamr rebounded offensively in 2005–06, scoring five goals and 26 points in 49 games, helping the team into the playoffs again. In 18 playoff games, Hamr had five goals and 15 points, finishing fourth in team scoring, as Färjestad won the championship, defeating Frölunda HC in six games.

=== Kloten Flyers (2006-2011) ===
Hamr joined the Kloten Flyers of National League A in 2006-07. In 42 games, Hamr had three goals and 38 points, helping the team reach the playoffs. In 11 playoff games, Hamr had two goals and 11 points, as Kloten lost to HC Davos in the semi-final.

Hamr had another very productive season in 2007-08, scoring seven goals and 35 points in 47 games, as Kloten made the playoffs again. In five post-season games, Hamr was limited to an assist.

In 2008-09, Hamr continued to shine offensively, scoring nine goals and 38 points in 47 games. He added a goal and seven points in 15 playoff games, as Kloten lost to HC Davos in seven games in the championship round.

Hamr saw injuries hamper his 2009-10, as he appeared in 14 games, scoring a goal and 10 points. He did not appear in any playoff games. Hamr would miss the entire 2010-11 season due to injuries.

=== Retirement ===
Hamr officially announced his retirement from hockey on April 23, 2012, as he joined Farjestad of the SEL as an assistant coach. He subsequently became a player agent in Sweden.

== Career statistics ==
=== Regular season and playoffs ===
			Regular season					Playoffs
Season	Team	League	GP	G	A	Pts	PIM	GP	G	A	Pts	PIM
1990–91	HC Slovan Usti nad Labem U20	CSSR U20	38	6	9	15	—	—	—	—	—	—
1991–92	Sparta Praha	CSSR	3	0	0	0	0	—	—	—	—	—
1992–93	Ottawa Senators	NHL	4	0	0	0	0	—	—	—	—	—
1992–93	New Haven Senators	AHL	59	4	21	25	18	—	—	—	—	—
1993–94	Ottawa Senators	NHL	7	0	0	0	0	—	—	—	—	—
1993–94	PEI Senators	AHL	69	10	26	36	44	—	—	—	—	—
1994–95	PEI Senators	AHL	7	0	1	1	2	—	—	—	—	—
1994–95	Fort Wayne Komets	IHL	58	3	13	16	14	1	0	0	0	0
1995–96	Sparta Praha	CZE	30	2	3	5	16	5	0	1	1	2
1996–97	Sparta Praha	CZE	48	12	20	32	4	10	2	5	7	4
1997–98	Frölunda	SWE	46	2	12	14	36	7	1	2	3	29
1998–99	Frölunda	SWE	9	0	0	0	6	—	—	—	—	—
1998–99	Färjestad	SWE	38	6	11	17	26	4	1	0	1	0
1999–00	Färjestad	SWE	50	7	14	21	46	7	0	1	1	6
2000–01	Färjestad	SWE	50	13	12	25	38	16	4	6	10	35
2001–02	Sparta Praha	CZE	23	4	6	10	14	13	0	6	6	8
2002–03	Färjestad	SWE	49	7	19	26	22	14	2	3	5	8
2003–04	Färjestad	SWE	44	11	15	26	22	17	1	3	4	10
2004–05	Färjestad	SWE	47	3	11	14	47	14	3	1	4	0
2005–06	Färjestad	SWE	49	5	21	26	32	18	5	10	15	24
2006–07	Kloten Flyers	NLA	42	3	35	38	40	11	2	9	11	22
2007–08	Kloten Flyers	NLA	47	7	28	35	46	5	0	1	1	6
2008–09	Kloten Flyers	NLA	47	9	29	38	62	15	1	6	7	12
2009–10	Kloten Flyers	NLA	14	1	9	10	20	—	—	—	—	—
SWE totals			382	54	115	169	275	97	17	26	43	112
NHL totals			11	0	0	0	0	—	—	—	—	—

=== International ===
Year	Team	Event	GP	G	A	Pts	PIM
1992	Czechoslovakia	EJC	6	1	2	3	6
2007	Czech Republic	WC	7	0	0	0	0
Junior totals			6	1	2	3	6
Senior totals			7	0	0	0	0
