= Brad Miller (ice hockey) =

Canadian ice hockey player (born 1969)

- Born: July 23, 1969 (age 57) Edmonton, Alberta, Canada
- Height: 6 ft 4 in (193 cm)
- Weight: 226 lb (103 kg; 16 st 2 lb)
- Position: Defence
- Shot: Left
- Played for: Buffalo Sabres; Ottawa Senators; Calgary Flames
- NHL draft: 22nd overall, 1987; Buffalo Sabres
- Playing career: 1988–2000

Brad Miller (born July 23, 1969) is a Canadian former professional ice hockey player. He played as a defencemen in 82 games in the National Hockey League (NHL) with the Buffalo Sabres, Ottawa Senators, and Calgary Flames between 1988 and 1993. The rest of his career, which lasted from 1988 to 2000, was spent in the minor leagues.

== Playing career ==
=== Amateur ===
Miller played junior hockey with the Knights of Columbus Knights in his hometown of Edmonton, Alberta. He graduated to major junior hockey with the Regina Pats of the Western Hockey League (WHL), attending their 1984 training camp, but failed to make the team. He returned for the 1985–86 season and cracked the lineup, paired with Kevin Ekhdal to start the campaign. In November 1985 he missed time after his neck was cut by an errant skate. The wound required 14 stitches to close. He was suspended for one game after having tape on his hand in a fight in March 1986. In 71 games with Regina, he recorded two goals and 14 assists for 16 points. The Pats qualified for the playoffs, but were eliminated in the round-robin first round. In ten playoff games, Miller added one goal and two points.

In the offseason, the Pats lost their head coach, Bill Moores, and was replaced by new head coach, Doug Sauter. Miller suited up for the Pats again for the 1986–87 season as one of three returning defencemen. He assumed a leadership role among the Pats' defence, improving his offence as well. He was one of three Pats to be named to the WHL all-star game in January. In 67 games, he scored ten goals and 48 points. However, the season was tumultuous with multiple players quitting on the team and another teammate, Brad Hornung, whose career was ended in an on-ice incident. Despite the trials, the team finished fifth in their division and made the playoffs. However, they were eliminated in the first round by the Moose Jaw Warriors. In three playoff games, Miller went scoreless.

Miller returned to the WHL for the 1987–88 season with Regina. He was selected to play in the 1987 WHL All-Star Game alongside teammate Craig Endean. He was out of the lineup for two weeks in March 1987 with an infected elbow, returning for the playoffs. However, the team was knocked out of contention in the first round. In four playoff games, Miller added one goal and two points. In his final season in the WHL in 1988–89, Miller played in 34 games, recording eight goals and 26 points. In February 1989, he replaced Scott Daniels as one of the team's alternate captains. However, his season was plagued by injuries and inconsistent play. In total, Miller scored 29 goals and registered 133 points in 233 games in the WHL.

=== Professional ===
Miller was drafted by the Buffalo Sabres of the National Hockey League (NHL) in the second round, 22nd overall, in the 1987 NHL entry draft. He joined the Sabres' American Hockey League (AHL) affiliate, the Rochester Americans at the end of the 1987–88 season, once his major junior team had been eliminated from their playoffs. He made his professional AHL debut against the Newmarket Saints on April 1, 1988. He made three appearances for the Americans, going scoreless. The Americans qualified for the playoffs and faced the Adirondack Red Wings in the opening round, ultimately losing the best-of-seven series 4–3. In two playoff games, Miller went scoreless.

At the end of August 1988, Miller signed a contract with the Sabres. At the team's training camp, he battled with three others for the final two spots in the Sabres' defence corps. Miller won one of the spots and made the Sabres roster out of training camp. However, he was assigned to the AHL on a two-week conditioning stint on October 12, shortly after the start of the NHL season. He was recalled by Buffalo on October 17 after appearing in three games, and since he was not returned to Regina, Buffalo paid the WHL team $20,000 to keep him. Miller made his NHL debut during the 1988–89 season in a 4–2 loss to the Toronto Maple Leafs on October 19. He played seven games with the Sabres, going scoreless. He was sent back to Regina on November 29. Once Regina had been eliminated from the playoff picture in the WHL, Miller was expected to join Rochester at the end of their season. However, he failed a physical due to the injuries sustained during the season with the Pats and was unable to play.

The 1989–90 season saw Miller spend the majority in the AHL with the Americans, making only one appearance with Buffalo on March 3, 1990, in a 3–3 tie with the Quebec Nordiques. Miller once again split the 1990–91 season between the Americans and the Sabres. In the 1991–92 season Miller made the Sabres out of training camp and played in 42 games, registering his first NHL point on October 16, 1991, assisting on a goal by Dave Snuggerud in a 5–1 loss to the Montreal Canadiens. Miller scored his first NHL goal on November 29 against Mike Richter of the New York Rangers in a 5–4 loss. However, Miller was sent back to the AHL in February 1992 after playing in 42 games, scoring the one goal and five points.

Miller was left unprotected by the Sabres in the 1992 NHL expansion draft and was selected by the Ottawa Senators. Miller made his Senators debut on October 12, 1992 in a 6–3 loss to the Boston Bruins. Miller spent some time on the left wing with the Senators but after Ottawa signed defenceman Gord Dineen, Miller was assigned to their AHL affiliate, the New Haven Senators, in January 1993. He finished with no points in eleven games with Ottawa and one goal and ten points in 41 games for New Haven. On February 26, 1993, Miller was traded to the Toronto Maple Leafs for a ninth-round pick in the 1993 NHL entry draft. The Maple Leafs immediately assigned him to their AHL affiliate, the St. John's Maple Leafs. and he finished the season there, tallying three assists in 20 games.

Prior to the 1993 training camp, Miller was traded by the Maple Leafs to the Calgary Flames on September 3, 1993, along with winger Jeff Perry for winger Todd Gillingham and defenceman Paul Holden. Miller made the Flames team out of training camp for the 1993–94 season and made his Calgary debut on October 10, in a 5–1 victory over the Vancouver Canucks. Miller registered his first point as a Flame in the game, assisting on Paul Ranheim's third period goal. He played his final game in the NHL by accident on November 15, against the Winnipeg Jets. The Flames intended to dress defenceman Kevin Wortman for the game, however, the coach of the Jets, John Paddock, noticed that Wortman's name was not on the game card, but Miller's was. Wortman was forced from the game for the error, and Miller played in the Flames' 7–2 victory. Miller was scratched for the next game against the Dallas Stars on November 21 before being sent on a two-week conditioning stint to the Flames' AHL affiliate, the Saint John Flames on November 25. However, Miller never played another game in the NHL. He finished the season with one point in eight games with Calgary and three goals and 15 points in 36 games with Saint John. The AHL Flames qualified for the playoffs, but were eliminated by the Moncton Hawks in the opening round. In six playoff games, Miller added one goal. At the end of the season, Miller became an unrestricted free agent.

For the 1994–95 season Miller signed with the expansion Minnesota Moose of the International Hockey League (IHL). He suffered a shoulder injury mid-season that caused him to miss time. He appeared in 55 games for the Moose, scoring one goal and 14 points. The Moose made the Turner Cup playoffs, but were knocked out of the competition by the Denver Grizzlies in the first round. In three playoff games, Miller went scorless. He returned to the Moose for the 1995–96 season and appeared in 33 games, registering five assists before being traded to the Atlanta Knights for future considerations on January 23, 1996. Miller suffered a shoulder injury that kept him out of the lineup from February into March. He made five appearances for the Knights, going scoreless. He also played a single game for the Utah Grizzlies that season.

Miller spent the 1996–97 season with the Quebec Rafales of the IHL. In 57 games with the Rafales he marked one goal and eight points. The Rafales made the playoffs and beat the Cincinnati Cyclones to advance to the second round, where they were eliminated by the Detroit Vipers. In four playoff games, Miller went scoreless. Miller was traded to the San Antonio Dragons along with defenceman David Barrozino for centre Michel Mongeau on August 21, 1997. In the 1997–98 season, he appeared in 58 games for San Antonio, tallying three goals and nine points. Miller was traded to the Utah Grizzlies on March 23, 1998 as compensation for an earlier trade between the two teams in which the Grizzlies were not properly informed of contract details. He was acquired to help the Grizzlies shore up their defence, and was on the third pairing with either Bob Needham or Jeff Libby. Miller played nine regular season games for the Utah Grizzlies that season, producing one assist. The Grizzlies qualified for the Turner Cup playoffs, but the Kansas City Blades made quick work of them, knocking them out of contention. In four playoff games, Miller went scorless.

For the 1998–99 season Miller signed with the Las Vegas Thunder in August 1998, where he was also named captain. He was fined by the league on December 29 for punching a player from the Minnesota Moose while on the bench. In 73 games with Las Vegas, he tallied five goals and 21 points. The Thunder folded after the season, and his rights were acquired by the Grand Rapids Griffins in July, but Miller retained the right to sign elsewhere. Miller played his final season with the Utah Grizzlies, signing with the team on September 17, 1999. He made 49 appearances, recording four assists, also playing some time as forward. The Grizzlies qualified for the playoffs, with Miller appearing in one playoff game, going scoreless as the team was eliminated in the Western Conference semifinals by the Houston Aeros.

== Personal life ==
After retiring from hockey, Miller joined Emcon Services, a road maintenance company in Alberta, Canada. He is married with two children, a son and daughter. His son, Braden, played major junior hockey with the Moose Jaw Warriors of the WHL.

== Career statistics ==
=== Regular season and playoffs ===
			Regular season					Playoffs
Season	Team	League	GP	G	A	Pts	PIM	GP	G	A	Pts	PIM
1985–86	Regina Pats	WHL	71	2	14	16	99	10	1	1	2	4
1986–87	Regina Pats	WHL	67	10	38	48	154	3	0	0	0	6
1987–88	Regina Pats	WHL	61	9	34	43	148	4	1	1	2	12
1987–88	Rochester Americans	AHL	3	0	0	0	4	2	0	0	0	2
1988–89	Regina Pats	WHL	34	8	18	26	95	—	—	—	—	—
1988–89	Rochester Americans	AHL	3	0	0	0	4	—	—	—	—	—
1988–89	Buffalo Sabres	NHL	7	0	0	0	6	—	—	—	—	—
1989–90	Rochester Americans	AHL	60	2	10	12	273	8	1	0	1	52
1989–90	Buffalo Sabres	NHL	1	0	0	0	0	—	—	—	—	—
1990–91	Rochester Americans	AHL	49	0	9	9	248	12	0	4	4	67
1990–91	Buffalo Sabres	NHL	13	0	0	0	67	—	—	—	—	—
1991–92	Rochester Americans	AHL	27	0	4	4	113	11	0	0	0	61
1991–92	Buffalo Sabres	NHL	42	1	4	5	192	—	—	—	—	—
1992–93	New Haven Senators	AHL	41	1	9	10	138	—	—	—	—	—
1992–93	Ottawa Senators	NHL	11	0	0	0	42	6	0	1	1	6
1992–93	St. John's Maple Leafs	AHL	20	0	3	3	61	8	0	2	2	10
1993–94	Calgary Flames	NHL	8	0	1	1	14	—	—	—	—	—
1993–94	Saint John Flames	AHL	36	3	12	15	174	6	1	0	1	21
1994–95	Minnesota Moose	IHL	55	1	13	14	181	3	0	0	0	12
1995–96	Minnesota Moose	IHL	33	0	5	5	170	—	—	—	—	—
1995–96	Utah Grizzlies	IHL	1	0	0	0	0	—	—	—	—	—
1995–96	Atlanta Knights	IHL	5	0	0	0	8	—	—	—	—	—
1996–97	Quebec Rafales	IHL	57	1	7	8	132	4	0	0	0	2
1997–98	San Antonio Dragons	IHL	58	3	6	9	228	—	—	—	—	—
1997–98	Utah Grizzlies	IHL	9	0	1	1	46	4	0	0	0	8
1998–99	Las Vegas Thunder	IHL	73	5	16	21	264	—	—	—	—	—
1999–00	Utah Grizzlies	IHL	49	0	4	4	118	1	0	0	0	4
NHL totals			82	1	5	6	321	—	—	—	—	—

== Bibliography ==
- Chaimovitch, Jason, ed. (2025). 2025–2026 American Hockey League Official Guide & Record Book. Springfield, Massachusetts: American Hockey League. OCLC 22147888.
