= New Haven Nighthawks =

Former professional minor league ice hockey team in New Haven, Connecticut

- City: New Haven, Connecticut
- League: American Hockey League
- Operated: 1972–1992
- Home arena: New Haven Coliseum
- Colors: blue, gold, and white (Islanders and North Stars) red, white, and blue (Rangers) black, silver and white (Kings)
- Affiliates: Minnesota North Stars, New York Islanders, New York Rangers, Los Angeles Kings

Franchise history
- 1972–1992: New Haven Nighthawks
- 1992–1993: New Haven Senators
- 1993–1996: Prince Edward Island Senators
- 2002–2017: Binghamton Senators
- 2017–present: Belleville Senators

Championships
- Regular season titles: 1 (1979–80)
- Division titles: 2 (1978–79, 1979–80)

The New Haven Nighthawks were a professional ice hockey team that played in the American Hockey League from 1972 to 1992. They had affiliations with the New York Islanders (1972–1973), Minnesota North Stars (1972–1977), New York Rangers (1977–1981 & 1984–1987), and Los Angeles Kings (1981–1991). The team played their home games at New Haven Coliseum.

== History ==
The Nighthawks were Calder Cup finalists four times: 1974–75, 1977–78, 1978–79 and a dramatic, unlikely playoff run in 1988–89 when they finished fourth in their division yet won two playoff rounds before succumbing to the Adirondack Red Wings in the finals in five games. Those same Red Wings would take the Hawks out again in their last post-season before becoming the short-lived New Haven Senators for the 1992–93 season.

Notable players for the Nighthawks include former New York Islanders greats Chico Resch, Bobby Nystrom; ex-Boston Bruins Willie O'Ree and Billy O'Dwyer; Tom Colley, the franchise's career leader in games (534), goals (204), assists (281) and points (485); career penalty minute leader (688) Al Tuer; ex-WHA star Bobby Sheehan, Cam Connor, Bernie Nicholls, Blaine Stoughton, Mike Rogers and Glenn Healy. The team was notorious for a revolving door for personnel holding the AHL record for players used in a single season with 62 in 1986. No player other than Colley played in as many as 300 games for the Nighthawks, while only two goaltenders played over 100 games. Ron Scott played in 153 games and Doug Soetaert played in 101.

The franchise was renamed the New Haven Senators for the 1992–93 season when they began an NHL affiliation with the Ottawa Senators. The following season, the franchise moved to Prince Edward Island. Today, it is known as the Belleville Senators.

The last Nighthawk to play in the National Hockey League was goaltender Byron Dafoe, who played seven games for the Nighthawks in its last season in 1992. The last Nighthawk active at any level of professional hockey was Mario Chitarroni, who played for New Haven in the 1988–89 season, and was active in the Italian professional league in 2009.

=== American Hockey League Hall of Famers ===
AHL Hall of Fame Honored Members
Name	Seasons	Induction Year
John Anderson	1991-92 (player)	2019
Robbie Ftorek	1984-86 (player); 1985-88 (head coach)	2020
Macgregor Kilpatrick	1972-79 (owner)	2010
Tim Tookey	1988-89 (player)	2008
Jim Wiemer	1984-87, 1988-89 (player)	2026

=== Franchise and area history ===
The franchise became known as:

- New Haven Senators (1992–1993)
- Prince Edward Island Senators (1993–1996)
- Binghamton Senators (2002–2017)
- Belleville Senators (2017–present)

The market was subsequently home to:

- Beast of New Haven (1997–1999)
- New Haven Knights (UHL) (2000–2002).
- Bridgeport Islanders (2001–2026)

== Season-by-season results ==
=== Regular season ===
Season	Games	Won	Lost	Tied	OTL	Points	Goals for	Goals against	Standing
1972–73	76	16	40	20	—	52	246	331	6th, East
1973–74	76	35	31	10	—	80	291	275	4th, North
1974–75	76	30	35	11	—	71	282	302	5th, North
1975–76	76	29	39	8	—	66	261	295	3rd, South
1976–77	80	43	31	6	—	92	333	287	2nd, AHL
1977–78	80	38	31	11	—	87	313	292	2nd, South
1978–79	80	46	25	9	—	101	346	271	1st, South
1979–80	80	46	25	9	—	101	350	305	1st, South
1980–81	80	29	40	11	—	69	295	321	4th, South
1981–82	80	39	33	8	—	86	292	276	3rd, South
1982–83	80	38	34	8	—	84	337	329	3rd, South
1983–84	80	36	40	4	—	76	365	371	5th, South
1984–85	80	31	41	8	—	70	315	341	5th, South
1985–86	80	36	37	7	—	79	340	343	4th, South
1986–87	80	44	25	—	11	99	331	315	3rd, South
1987–88	80	33	37	7	3	76	288	307	5th, North
1988–89	80	35	35	10	—	80	325	309	4th, North
1989–90	80	32	41	7	—	71	283	316	7th, North
1990–91	80	24	45	11	—	59	246	324	7th, North
1991–92	80	39	37	4	—	82	305	309	3rd, North

=== Playoffs ===
The Nighthawks were runners-up for the Calder Cup in 1974–75, 1977–78, 1978–79, & 1988–89.

Season	1st round	2nd round	Finals
1972–73	Out of playoffs		
1973–74	W, 4–2, Rochester	L, 0–4, Providence	—
1974–75	W, 4–1, Virginia	W, 4–1, HER	L, 1–4, Springfield
1975–76	L, 0–3, Richmond	—	—
1976–77	L, 2–4, Rochester	—	—
1977–78	W, 3–1, Philadelphia	W, 4–2, Rochester	L, 1–4, Maine
1978–79	bye	W, 4–2, Binghamton	L, 0–4, Maine
1979–80	W, 4–0, Rochester	L, 2–4, Hershey	—
1980–81	L, 0–4, Hershey	—	—
1981–82	L, 1–3, Rochester	—	—
1982–83	W, 4–1, Hershey	L, 3-4 Rochester	—
1983–84	Out of playoffs		
1984–85	Out of playoffs		
1985–86	L, 1–4, Hershey	—	—
1986–87	L, 3–4, Binghamton	—	—
1987–88	Out of playoffs		
1988–89	W, 4–2, Sherbrooke	W, 4–2, Moncton	L, 1–4, Adirondack
1989–90	Out of playoffs		
1990–91	Out of playoffs		
1991–92	L, 1–4, Adirondack	—	—

== See also ==
- Professional ice hockey in Connecticut
