= Andy Schneider =

American hockey player

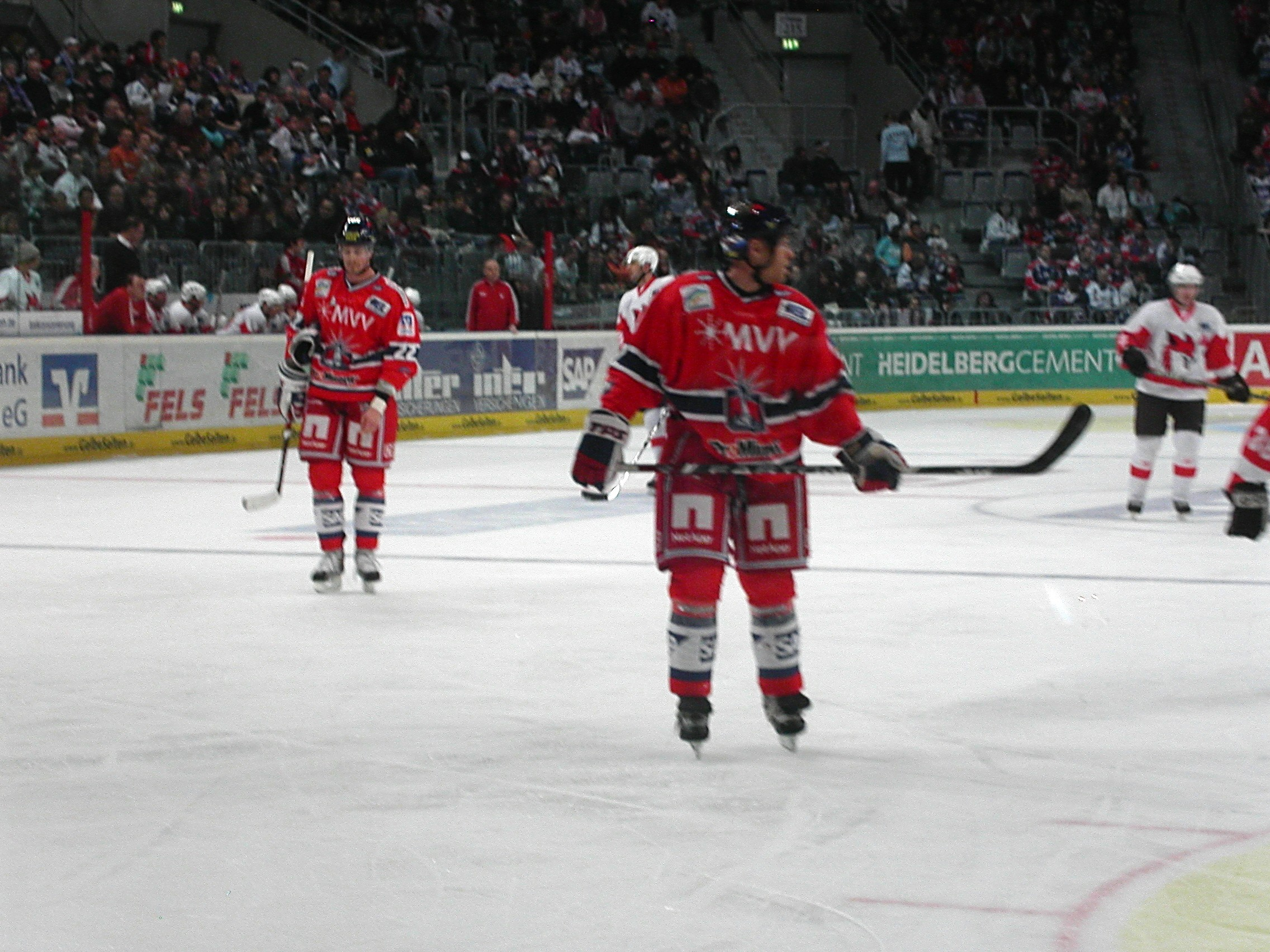
- Born: July 31, 1981 (age 43); Grand Forks, North Dakota, USA
- Height: 6 ft 1 in (185 cm)
- Weight: 215 lb (98 kg; 15 st 5 lb)
- Position: Defense
- Shot: Left
- Played for: Wilkes-Barre/Scranton Penguins; Wheeling Nailers; Portland Pirates; Toronto Marlies; Adler Mannheim; Iserlohn Roosters
- NHL draft: 156th overall, 2001; Pittsburgh Penguins
- Playing career: 2005–2010

Andrew Schneider (born July 31, 1981) is an American former professional ice hockey defenseman who played in the American Hockey League (AHL), ECHL, and German Deutsche Eishockey Liga (DEL). He has been an assistant coach for the Lincoln Stars and the Swift Current Broncos.

== Playing career ==
He joined on January 28, 2009, from Toronto Marlies of the American Hockey League to Adler Mannheim.

Drafted in 2001 by the Pittsburgh Penguins, he was a 5th round pick (156th overall).

Since drafted, he has yet to appear in an NHL hockey game, playing US College hockey after being drafted, and joining the AHL Portland Pirates for the 2007–08 season.

== Awards and honors ==
Award	Year
All-WCHA Third Team	2002–03

== Career statistics ==
			Regular season					Playoffs
Season	Team	League	GP	G	A	Pts	PIM	GP	G	A	Pts	PIM
1998–99	Lincoln Stars	USHL	9	0	4	4	8	4	0	0	0	2
1999–2000	Lincoln Stars	USHL	46	7	10	17	102	10	6	4	10	27
2000–01	Lincoln Stars	USHL	54	12	24	36	134	10	3	7	10	17
2001–02	University of North Dakota	WCHA	35	3	11	14	65	—	—	—	—	—
2002–03	University of North Dakota	WCHA	43	11	30	41	52	—	—	—	—	—
2003–04	University of North Dakota	WCHA	39	2	10	12	54	—	—	—	—	—
2004–05	University of North Dakota	WCHA	42	2	8	10	58	—	—	—	—	—
2005–06	Wilkes–Barre/Scranton Penguins	AHL	50	3	13	16	54	—	—	—	—	—
2005–06	Wheeling Nailers	ECHL	4	0	1	1	2	—	—	—	—	—
2007–08	Portland Pirates	AHL	57	3	8	11	81	11	2	3	5	6
2008–09	Toronto Marlies	AHL	32	0	5	5	42	—	—	—	—	—
2008–09	Adler Mannheim	DEL	7	0	1	1	10	—	—	—	—	—
2009–10	Iserlohn Roosters	DEL	50	2	9	11	79	—	—	—	—	—
AHL totals			139	6	26	32	177	11	2	3	5	6
