= Scott White (ice hockey) =

Canadian ice hockey executive (born 1968)

- Born: March 15, 1968 (age 58); Ormstown, Quebec, Canada
- Occupation: Director of Hockey Operations
- Years active: 1994 to present
- Employer: Dallas Stars
- Organization: National Hockey League

Scott White (born March 15, 1968) is a Canadian ice hockey executive. He is currently the general manager of the Texas Stars of the American Hockey League (AHL), and is also the director of hockey operations for the Dallas Stars of the National Hockey League (NHL).

White has served as the general manager of the Texas Stars of the AHL since 2009. On May 31, 2013, the Dallas Stars announced that White would take on the additional responsibility as the director of hockey operations for the NHL team.
