= Peter Sidorkiewicz =

Polish-Canadian ice hockey player

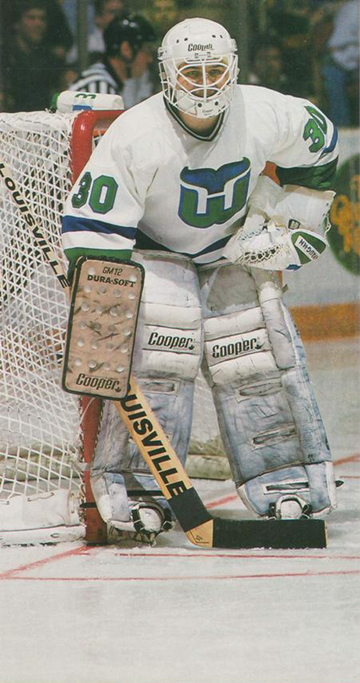
- Sidorkiewicz with the Hartford Whalers in 1989
- Born: June 29, 1963 (age 63) Dąbrowa Białostocka, Poland
- Height: 5 ft 9 in (175 cm)
- Weight: 180 lb (82 kg; 12 st 12 lb)
- Position: Goaltender
- Caught: Left
- Played for: Hartford Whalers; Ottawa Senators; New Jersey Devils
- National team: Canada
- NHL draft: 91st overall, 1981; Washington Capitals
- Playing career: 1987–1998

Peter Paul Sidorkiewicz (born June 29, 1963) is a Polish-Canadian former professional ice hockey goaltender. Sidorkiewicz played in the National Hockey League (NHL) with the Hartford Whalers, Ottawa Senators, and New Jersey Devils, representing the Wales Conference in the 1993 NHL All-Star Game. Since retiring as a player, Sidorkiewicz has worked as a coach for the Erie Otters of the Ontario Hockey League, Dornbirner EC of the Austrian Hockey League and the Norfolk Admirals of the ECHL.

== Early life ==
Sidorkiewicz was born on June 29, 1963 in Dąbrowa Białostocka, Poland, but moved to Oshawa, Ontario, Canada, with his family when he was three years old. He grew up playing softball and it was not until one of his coaches suggest he try ice hockey out at the age of 10. Sidorkiewicz played minor hockey in Oshawa and won an Ontario Bantam Championship in 1977.

== Junior hockey ==
=== Oshawa Generals (1980–1984) ===
Sidorkiewicz joined the Oshawa Generals of the Ontario Hockey League (OHL) in 1980–81, winning three, losing three and no ties (3–3–0) with a 4.68 goals against average (GAA) in seven games. Sidorkiewicz also saw some playing time in the post-season, going 2–2 with a 4.51 GAA in five games. Sidorkiewicz saw his playing time increase during the 1981–82 season, playing in 29 games with the Generals, earning a 14–11–1 record with a 4.75 GAA. Sidorkiewicz would only see action in one playoff game, going 0–0 with a 4.62 GAA in 13 minutes of playing time.

He became the Generals starting goaltender in 1982–83, as in 60 games, Sidorkiewicz posted a 36–20–3 record with a 3.61 GAA. In the playoffs, Sidorkiewicz helped lead the Generals to the J. Ross Robertson Cup as OHL playoff champions by posting a 15–1–1 record with a 3.68 GAA in 17 games, as the Generals qualified for the 1983 Memorial Cup. In the Memorial Cup, Oshawa would make it to the final game. However, they lost to the Portland Winterhawks with Cam Neely netting a hat trick on Sidorkiewicz in the game. In the tournament, Sidorkiewicz had a 3–2 record with a 5.12 GAA in five games. He was named to the 1983 Memorial Cup all-star team alongside teammates Joe Cirella and John MacLean. Sidorkiewicz and fellow netminder and teammate Jeff Hogg won the Dave Pinkney Trophy in the OHL for lowest goals against average.

Sidorkiewicz returned to the Generals for the 1983–84 season, going 28–21–1 with a 5.06 GAA in 52 games with Oshawa. In the post-season, he had a 3–4 record with a 3.86 GAA in seven games, as the Generals were swept by the Ottawa 67's in the quarter-finals.

== Professional career ==
=== Washington Capitals (1984–1985) ===
Sidorkiewicz was drafted by the Washington Capitals of the National Hockey League (NHL) in the fifth round, 91st overall, of the 1981 NHL entry draft. He turned professional in 1984 and was assigned to the Capitals' International Hockey League (IHL) affiliate, the Fort Wayne Komets, sharing the net with Alain Chevrier. Sidorkiewicz had a 4–4–2 record with a 4.37 GAA in 10 games with the Komets. However, an injury to Capitals' goaltender Al Jensen earned a goaltender on the Capitals' American Hockey League (AHL) affiliate Binghamton Whalers a recall and Sidorkiewicz was shuffled to Binghamton as cover. Sidorkiewicz shone with Binghamton and was a leading candidate for the AHL's most valuable player award, helping the team to one of the best records in the league. On March 12, 1985, Washington traded Sidorkiewicz and Dean Evason to the Hartford Whalers for David Jensen.

=== Hartford Whalers (1985–1992) ===
When Sidorkiewicz was acquired by Hartford from Washington, he remained with the Binghamton Whalers as the two clubs shared the team. Along with Mike Liut and Steve Weeks, Sidorkiewicz was acquired by Hartford's general manager Emile Francis in an effort to rebuild the Whalers. Sidorkiewicz had an impressive 1984–85 season with Binghamton, going 31–9–5 with a 3.05 GAA in 45 games. In the post-season, Sidorkiewicz went 4–4 with a 3.87 GAA in eight games with the AHL Whalers which were eliminated in the Calder Cup semi-finals by the Baltimore Skipjacks. In 1985–86, Sidorkiewicz had a 21–22–3 record with a 3.19 GAA in 49 games with Binghamton, helping the club reach the playoffs. His GAA led the AHL. In four post-season games, Sidorkiewicz had a 1–3 record with a 3.06 GAA as the Whalers lost in six games to the St. Catharines Saints. Sidorkiewicz had a very solid 1986–87 with Binghamton, earning a 23–16–0 record in 57 games with a 2.92 GAA and a .889 save percentage. In the playoffs, the Whalers defeated the New Haven Nighthawks in seven games in the opening series, but lost to the Rochester Americans in six games in the following round. Sidorkiewicz had a 6–7 record with a 2.72 GAA in 13 games. He was named to the AHL's Second All-Star Team.

Sidorkiewicz returned to Binghamton for the 1987–88, going 19–17–3 with a 3.68 GAA in 42 games, helping the club reach the post-season. In three playoff games, Sidorkiewicz was 0–2 with a 3.27 GAA. Sidorkiewicz also saw his NHL debut in 1987–88, after he was recalled when starting goaltender Mike Liut was sidelined with back spasms. He started for the Hartford Whalers on October 16, 1987 against the Washington Capitals in his only NHL game for the season. Sidorkiewicz made 30 saves in his NHL debut though the Whalers lost 6–2, with Bengt-Åke Gustafsson scoring twice for the Capitals.

Sidorkiewicz would stay in the NHL for good in 1988–89, as he began the season as the back-up goaltender with Hartford, playing behind Liut. On October 15, 1988, Sidorkiewicz earned his first career NHL victory, defeating the Chicago Blackhawks 7–5 at the Hartford Civic Center, saving 25 of the 30 shots he faced and teammate Ron Francis picked up two goals. On December 6, 1988, Sidorkiewicz earned his first career shutout, as the Whalers crushed the Buffalo Sabres by a score of 9–0, with Kevin Dineen and Sylvain Côté each scoring twice for Hartford. Overall, in 44 games, Sidorkiewicz had a 22–18–4 record with a 3.03 GAA and a .890 save percentage, as well as four shutouts, helping the Whalers make the playoffs. In two playoff games, Sidorkiewicz went 0–2 with a 3.87 GAA and a .822 save percentage as the club was swept by the Montreal Canadiens in the Adams Division semi-finals, splitting time with Kay Whitmore. Sidorkiewicz finished fourth in Calder Memorial Trophy voting and was named to the NHL All-Rookie Team.

Sidorkiewicz began the 1989–90 season splitting his playing time with Liut, who missed time with injury again. The Whalers traded Liut to the Washington Capitals just before the trade deadline on March 6, 1990, making Sidorkiewicz the undisputed number one goaltender in Hartford. In 46 games, Sidorkiewicz had a 19–19–7 record with a 3.57 GAA and .866 save percentage. In seven playoff games, Sidorkiewicz went 3–4 with a 3.22 GAA and .881 save percentage as the Whalers lost a thrilling seven game series against the first place Boston Bruins. In 1990–91, Sidorkiewicz helped the Whalers reach the post-season, as in 52 games, he posted a 21–22–7 record with a 3.33 GAA and .872 save percentage. In six playoff games, he had a 2–4 record with a 4.01 GAA and .862 save percentage as Hartford lost to the Boston Bruins for the second straight season.

Sidorkiewicz and his backup Whitmore struggled during 1991–92 season, with Sidorkiewicz going 9–19–6 with a 3.34 GAA and a .882 save percentage in 35 games. With Whitmore and Sidorkiewicz struggling, general manager Ed Johnston acquired goalie Frank Pietrangelo from the Pittsburgh Penguins at the trade deadline on March 11, 1992. Sidorkiewicz fell to third on the depth chart and did not dress for any of Hartford's playoff games. On June 18, 1992, Sidorkiewicz was exposed by the Whalers in the 1992 NHL expansion draft and was claimed by the Ottawa Senators with their first selection.

=== Ottawa Senators (1992–1993) ===
Sidorkiewicz joined the Ottawa Senators for their first season in 1992–93 as their starting goaltender signing a three-year contract in August 1992. He started the first game in Senators history, earning the win as Ottawa defeated the Montreal Canadiens 5–3. He would not win again for another 20 games as the Senators played poorly in front of Sidorkiewicz. Sidorkiewicz appeared in a career high 64 games with the Senators, going 8–46–3 with a 4.43 GAA and .856 save percentage. Sidorkiewicz, despite his statistics, became a fan favourite in Ottawa and appeared in the 44th National Hockey League All-Star Game held at the Montreal Forum. He earned the victory in a 16–6 win for the Wales Conference over the Campbell Conference. At the end of the season, Sidorkiewicz injured his shoulder, requiring offseason surgery. After just one season, on June 20, 1993, the Senators traded Sidorkiewicz and future considerations to the New Jersey Devils for Craig Billington and Troy Mallette and a fourth-round draft choice.

=== New Jersey Devils (1993–1998) ===
Initially, the Devils were unhappy with the trade. The Devils asked the NHL to review the trade after they found Sidorkiewicz's recovery from shoulder surgery had not gone properly. He saw very little action with the Devils in 1993–94, as he appeared in only three games, going 0–3–0 with a 2.77 GAA and a .891 save percentage. The shoulder injury that kept him out of the lineup allowed for the emergence of Martin Brodeur in New Jersey's net alongside Chris Terreri. Sidorkiewicz spent the remainder of the season splitting time between the Albany River Rats of the AHL and the Fort Wayne Komets of the IHL. He had a 6–7–2 record with Albany with a 3.97 GAA in 15 games, and with the Fort Wayne Komets of the IHL, in 11 games he went 6–3–0 with a 2.74 GAA and two shutouts. In 18 playoff games with the Komets, Sidorkiewicz went 10–8 with a 3.36 GAA and losing to the Atlanta Knights in the Turner Cup final.

Sidorkiewicz remained with the Komets for the 1994–95 season, going 8–6–1 with a 3.70 GAA and .879 save percentage in 16 games. In three playoff games, he went 1–2 with a 5.00 GAA. He returned to the Albany River Rats in 1995–96 as a backup to Mike Dunham. However, Dunham went down with an injury in late December and Sidorkiewicz took over as the starter until his return. Sidorkiewicz had a 19–7–5 record with 2.95 GAA and .898 save percentage in 32 games. In one playoff game, he had a 0–1 record with a 3.05 GAA. Sidorkiewicz became the River Rats starting goaltender in 1996–97, earning a 31–23–6 record in 62 games, while posting a 2.90 GAA and a .901 save percentage. In 16 playoff games, he had a 7–8 record with a 3.13 GAA. In 1997–98, Sidorkiewicz appeared in 43 games with Albany, going 21–15–5 with a 2.85 GAA and a .896 save percentage. In two playoff games, Sidorkiewicz had a 1–1 record with a 4.04 GAA. Sidorkiewicz made his final NHL appearance in the 1997–98 season on December 30, 1997, playing the third period allowing one goal, in a 6–2 loss to the Chicago Blackhawks. Starting goaltender Martin Brodeur missed the game due to an illness and his backup, Mike Dunham, played the first ten minutes without a backup of his own, as Sidorkiewicz was late arriving from Albany. After the season, Sidorkiewicz retired from hockey.

== International play ==
Medal record

Ice hockey

Representing Canada

World Championships
| Silver medal – second place | 1989 Sweden | |

Sidorkiewicz was named a member of the Team Canada for the 1989 IIHF World Championships in Sweden. Canada finished second to Russia, earning a silver medal.

== Coaching career ==
=== Erie Otters (1999–2013) ===
Sidorkiewicz joined the Erie Otters of the OHL in 1999, as an assistant coach and remained in this position until he was named the Otters head coach prior to the 2006–07 OHL season. In his first and only full season as the Otters head coach, Sidorkiewicz led the rebuilding club to a 15–50–3 record, failing to qualify for the playoffs. In 2007–08, Sidorkiewicz began as head coach of the team, however, he returned to his previous job as an assistant as the Otters hired Robbie Ftorek as head coach in October. Ftorek was let go by the Otters in 2012 and replaced by Kris Knoblauch who kept Sidorkiewicz on his staff until the end of the season in 2013.

=== Dornbirner EC (2014–2017) ===
In August 2014, Sidorkiewicz was named assistant coach of Dornbirner EC of the Austrian Hockey League (EBEL) under head coach Dave MacQueen. In the 2016–17, Sidorkiewicz was named head coach of the team while MacQueen returned to Canada following a death in the family.

=== Norfolk Admirals (2017–2019) ===
Prior to the 2017–18 ECHL season, Sidorkiewicz joined the Norfolk Admirals as an assistant coach, where he was reunited with head coach Robbie Ftorek after working together while they were both part of the Erie Otters coaching staff. After the 2018–19 season concluded, both Sidorkiewicz and Ftorek were released with the arrival of new ownership.

== Personal life ==
Sidorkiewicz was named to the Oshawa Sports Hall of Fame in 2013.

== Coaching record ==
=== Ontario Hockey League ===
| Team | Year | Regular season | | | | | | Postseason |
| Team | Year | G | W | L | OTL | Pts | Finish | Result |
|---|---|---|---|---|---|---|---|---|
| Erie Otters | 2006–07 | 68 | 15 | 50 | 3 | 33 | 5th in Midwest | Missed playoffs |
| Erie Otters | 2007–08 | 15 | 3 | 12 | 0 | 6 | 5th in Midwest | Resigned |
| OHL totals | 2006–2008 | 83 | 18 | 62 | 3 | 39 | | 0-0 (0.000) |

== Awards and achievements ==
- Memorial Cup Tournament All-Star Team (1983)
- AHL Second All-Star Team (1987)
- NHL All-Rookie Team (1989)
- NHL All-Star Game (1993)

== Career statistics ==
=== Regular season and playoffs ===
| | | | Regular season | | | | | | | | | Playoffs |
| Season | Team | League | GP | W | L | T | MIN | GA | SO | GAA | SV% | GP | W | L | MIN | GA | SO | GAA | SV% |
|---|---|---|---|---|---|---|---|---|---|---|---|---|---|---|---|---|---|---|---|
| 1980–81 | Oshawa Legionnaires | MetJHL | 22 | — | — | — | 1300 | 70 | 1 | 3.23 | — | — | — | — | — | — | — | — | — |
| 1980–81 | Oshawa Generals | OHL | 7 | 3 | 3 | 0 | 308 | 24 | 0 | 4.68 | — | 5 | 2 | 2 | 266 | 20 | 0 | 4.52 | — |
| 1981–82 | Oshawa Generals | OHL | 29 | 14 | 11 | 1 | 1553 | 123 | 2 | 4.75 | — | 1 | 0 | 0 | 13 | 1 | 0 | 4.62 | — |
| 1982–83 | Oshawa Generals | OHL | 60 | 36 | 20 | 3 | 3536 | 213 | 0 | 3.61 | — | 17 | 15 | 1 | 1020 | 60 | 0 | 3.53 | — |
| 1982–83 | Oshawa Generals | MC | — | — | — | — | — | — | — | — | — | 5 | 3 | 2 | 293 | 25 | 0 | 5.12 | — |
| 1983–84 | Oshawa Generals | OHL | 52 | 28 | 21 | 1 | 2966 | 250 | 1 | 4.15 | — | 7 | 3 | 4 | 420 | 27 | 1 | 3.86 | — |
| 1984–85 | Binghamton Whalers | AHL | 45 | 31 | 9 | 5 | 2691 | 137 | 3 | 3.05 | .901 | 8 | 4 | 4 | 481 | 31 | 0 | 3.87 | — |
| 1984–85 | Fort Wayne Komets | IHL | 10 | 4 | 4 | 2 | 590 | 43 | 0 | 4.37 | — | — | — | — | — | — | — | — | — |
| 1985–86 | Binghamton Whalers | AHL | 49 | 21 | 22 | 3 | 2819 | 150 | 2 | 3.19 | .883 | 4 | 1 | 3 | 235 | 12 | 0 | 3.06 | — |
| 1986–87 | Binghamton Whalers | AHL | 57 | 23 | 16 | 0 | 3304 | 161 | 4 | 2.92 | .889 | 13 | 6 | 7 | 794 | 36 | 0 | 2.72 | — |
| 1987–88 | Hartford Whalers | NHL | 1 | 0 | 1 | 0 | 60 | 6 | 0 | 6.00 | .833 | — | — | — | — | — | — | — | — |
| 1987–88 | Binghamton Whalers | AHL | 42 | 19 | 17 | 3 | 2345 | 144 | 0 | 3.68 | .878 | 3 | 0 | 2 | 147 | 8 | 0 | 3.27 | .892 |
| 1988–89 | Hartford Whalers | NHL | 44 | 22 | 18 | 4 | 2635 | 133 | 4 | 3.03 | .890 | 2 | 0 | 2 | 124 | 8 | 0 | 3.87 | .822 |
| 1989–90 | Hartford Whalers | NHL | 46 | 19 | 19 | 7 | 2703 | 161 | 1 | 3.57 | .866 | 7 | 3 | 4 | 429 | 23 | 0 | 3.21 | .881 |
| 1990–91 | Hartford Whalers | NHL | 52 | 21 | 22 | 7 | 2953 | 164 | 1 | 3.33 | .872 | 6 | 2 | 4 | 359 | 24 | 0 | 4.02 | .862 |
| 1991–92 | Hartford Whalers | NHL | 35 | 9 | 19 | 6 | 1995 | 111 | 2 | 3.34 | .882 | — | — | — | — | — | — | — | — |
| 1992–93 | Ottawa Senators | NHL | 64 | 8 | 46 | 3 | 3388 | 250 | 0 | 4.43 | .856 | — | — | — | — | — | — | — | — |
| 1993–94 | New Jersey Devils | NHL | 3 | 0 | 3 | 0 | 130 | 6 | 0 | 2.77 | .891 | — | — | — | — | — | — | — | — |
| 1993–94 | Albany River Rats | AHL | 15 | 6 | 7 | 2 | 907 | 60 | 0 | 3.97 | .861 | — | — | — | — | — | — | — | — |
| 1993–94 | Fort Wayne Komets | IHL | 11 | 6 | 3 | 0 | 591 | 27 | 2 | 2.74 | .912 | 18 | 10 | 8 | 1054 | 59 | 1 | 3.36 | .889 |
| 1994–95 | Fort Wayne Komets | IHL | 16 | 8 | 6 | 1 | 941 | 58 | 1 | 3.70 | .879 | 3 | 1 | 2 | 144 | 12 | 0 | 5.00 | .846 |
| 1995–96 | Albany River Rats | AHL | 32 | 19 | 7 | 5 | 1809 | 89 | 3 | 2.95 | .898 | 1 | 0 | 1 | 59 | 3 | 0 | 3.06 | .875 |
| 1996–97 | Albany River Rats | AHL | 62 | 31 | 23 | 6 | 3539 | 171 | 2 | 2.90 | .901 | 16 | 7 | 8 | 920 | 48 | 0 | 3.13 | .892 |
| 1997–98 | New Jersey Devils | NHL | 1 | 0 | 0 | 0 | 20 | 1 | 0 | 3.00 | .875 | — | — | — | — | — | — | — | — |
| 1997–98 | Albany River Rats | AHL | 43 | 21 | 15 | 5 | 2422 | 115 | 3 | 2.85 | .896 | 2 | 1 | 1 | 89 | 6 | 0 | 4.01 | .813 |
| AHL totals | | | 345 | 171 | 116 | 29 | 19,836 | 1027 | 17 | 3.11 | .891 | 47 | 19 | 26 | 2725 | 144 | 0 | 3.17 | — |
| NHL totals | | | 246 | 79 | 128 | 27 | 13,884 | 832 | 8 | 3.60 | .871 | 15 | 5 | 10 | 912 | 55 | 0 | 3.62 | .867 |

=== International ===
| Year | Team | Event | GP | W | L | T | MIN | GA | SO | GAA |
|---|---|---|---|---|---|---|---|---|---|---|
| 1989 | Canada | WC | 1 | 0 | 0 | 0 | 25 | 0 | 0 | 0.00 |
