= Prince Edward Island Senators =

- City: Charlottetown, Prince Edward Island
- League: American Hockey League
- Operated: 1993–1996
- Home arena: Charlottetown Civic Centre
- Colours: Red, black, bronze and white
- Affiliates: Ottawa Senators

Franchise history
- 1972–1992: New Haven Nighthawks
- 1992–1993: New Haven Senators
- 1993–1996: Prince Edward Island Senators
- 2002–2017: Binghamton Senators
- 2017–present: Belleville Senators

Championships
- Division titles: 2 (1994–95, 1995–96)

The Prince Edward Island Senators were a professional ice hockey team that played in the American Hockey League (AHL) from 1993 to 1996. Originally located in New Haven, Connecticut, for 21 seasons, including one as the affiliate of the National Hockey League (NHL) Ottawa Senators, the franchise relocated to Charlottetown, Prince Edward Island, for the 1993–94 season. During their three seasons in PEI, they finished either last or second to last in attendance in the AHL, with average attendance ranging from 2,300 to 2,500. The most notable NHL player to come out of the PEI organization was Pavol Demitra, who spent three seasons with P.E.I. The franchise suspended operations after the 1996 season, claiming that Charlottetown was too small to support an AHL team.

== Season-by-season results ==
=== Regular season ===
Season	Games	Won	Lost	Tied	OTL	Points	Goals for	Goals against	Standing
1993–94	80	23	49	8	—	54	269	356	6th, Atlantic
1994–95	80	41	31	8	—	90	305	271	1st, Atlantic
1995–96	80	38	33	6	3	85	303	313	1st, Atlantic

=== Playoffs ===
Season	1st round	2nd round	3rd round	Finals
1993–94	Out of playoffs			
1994–95	W, 4–1, Saint John	L, 2–4, Fredericton	—	—
1995–96	L, 2–3, Fredericton	—	—	—

== Team records ==
Single season
Goals: 53, Steve Larouche
Assists: 57, Michel Picard
Points: 101, Steve Larouche
Penalty minutes: 314, Darcy Simon
GAA: 3.10, Jean-Francois Labbe
SV%: 0.906, Jean-Francois Labbe
Wins: 25, Mike Bales

Career
Career goals: Pavol Demitra, Greg Pankewicz, 70 goals
Career assists: Pavol Demitra, 124 assists
Career points: Pavol Demitra, 196 points
Career penalty minutes: Darcy Simon, 534 PIM
Career goaltending wins: Mike Bales, Kendall Palmer, 25 wins
Career shutouts: Mike Bales, Jean-Francois Labbe, 2 SO
Career games: Chad Penney, 223 GP
Career Coaching Wins: Tommy Walker, 51
