= New Haven Senators =

- City: New Haven, Connecticut
- League: American Hockey League
- Operated: 1992–93 AHL season
- Home arena: New Haven Coliseum
- Colors: Red, black, bronze and white
- Affiliates: Ottawa Senators

Franchise history
- 1972–1992: New Haven Nighthawks
- 1992–1993: New Haven Senators
- 1993–1996: Prince Edward Island Senators
- 2002–2017: Binghamton Senators
- 2017–present: Belleville Senators

The New Haven Senators were a professional ice hockey team that played in the American Hockey League during the 1992–93 AHL season. The team played their home games at the New Haven Coliseum. The Senators were known as the New Haven Nighthawks. from 1972 to 1992. The team changed their name to match their new parent club, the Ottawa Senators.

The market was subsequently home to:

- Beast of New Haven (1997–1999)
- New Haven Knights (UHL) (2000–2002).
- Bridgeport Sound Tigers (2001–present)

== Individual records ==
Goals: 23 - Greg Pankewicz
Assists: 44 - Scott White
Points: 60 - Martin St. Amour
Penalty minutes: 195 - Gerry St. Cyr
GAA: 3.32 - Darrin Madeley
SV%: .905 - Darrin Madeley
Goaltending wins: 10 - Darrin Madeley and Mark Laforest
Shutouts: 1 - Mark Laforest
Games: 80 - Scott White

== Results ==
Season	Games	Won	Lost	Tied	Points	Goals for	Goals against	Standing	Playoffs
1992–93	80	22	47	11	55	262	343	5th, North	Out of playoffs

== See also ==
- Professional Hockey In Connecticut
