= List of Washington Capitals records =

This is a list of franchise records for the Washington Capitals of the National Hockey League.

== Individual records ==
=== Skaters ===
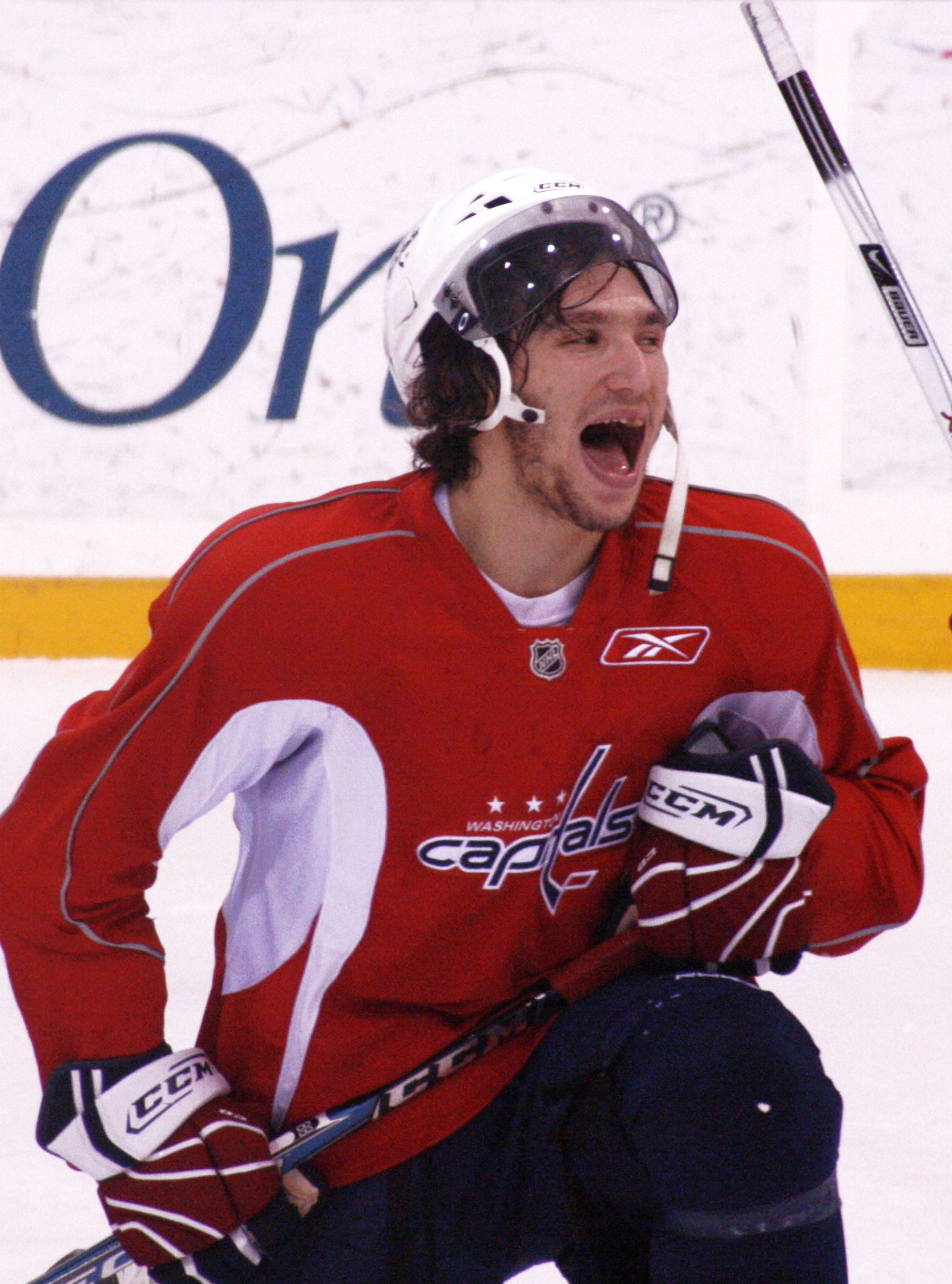
Alexander Ovechkin leads the team in goals scored in a season.

Games played
#	Player	GP	Seasons
1	Alexander Ovechkin	1,572	2005–present
2	John Carlson	1,143	2009–2026
3	Nicklas Backstrom	1,105	2007–2023
4	Calle Johansson	983	1989–2003
5	Peter Bondra	961	1990–2004
Active leader
1	Alexander Ovechkin	1,572	2005–present

Goals
#	Player	G	Seasons
1	Alexander Ovechkin	929	2005–present
2	Peter Bondra	472	1990–2004
3	Mike Gartner	397	1979–1989
4	Nicklas Backstrom	271	2007–2023
5	Mike Ridley	218	1987–1994
Active leader
1	Alexander Ovechkin	929	2005–present

Assists
#	Player	A	Seasons
1	Nicklas Backstrom	762	2007–2023
2	Alexander Ovechkin	758	2005–present
3	John Carlson	605	2009–2026
4	Michal Pivonka	418	1986–1999
5	Evgeny Kuznetsov	397	2014–2024
Active leader
2	Alexander Ovechkin	758	2005–present

Points
#	Player	Pts	Seasons
1	Alexander Ovechkin	1,687	2005–present
2	Nicklas Backstrom	1,033	2007–2023
3	Peter Bondra	825	1990–2004
4	Mike Gartner	789	1979–1989
5	John Carlson	771	2009–2026
Active leader
1	Alexander Ovechkin	1,686	2005–present

Penalty in minutes
#	Player	PIM	Seasons
1	Dale Hunter	2,003	1987–1999
2	Tom Wilson	1,649	2013–present
3	Scott Stevens	1,628	1982–1990
4	Craig Berube	1,220	1993–1999
5	Alan May	1,189	1989–1994
Active leader
2	Tom Wilson	1,649	2013–present

Power-play goals
#	Player	PPG	Seasons
1	Alexander Ovechkin	331	2005–present
2	Peter Bondra	137	1990–2004
3	Mike Gartner	98	1979–1989
4	Nicklas Backstrom	86	2007–2023
5	T.J. Oshie	76	2015–2024
Active leader
1	Alexander Ovechkin	331	2005–present

Short-handed goals
#	Player	SHG	Seasons
1	Peter Bondra	32	1990–2004
1	Mike Ridley	17	1987–1994
1	Bengt-Åke Gustafsson	17	1979–1989
4	Kelly Miller	15	1986–1999
5	Mike Gartner	12	1979–1989
Active leader
5	Tom Wilson	12	2013–present

Game winning goals
#	Player	GWG	Seasons
1	Alexander Ovechkin	141	2005–present
2	Peter Bondra	73	1990–2004
3	Mike Gartner	54	1979–1989
4	Nicklas Backstrom	39	2007–2023
5	Bengt-Åke Gustafsson	33	1979–1989
Active leader
1	Alexander Ovechkin	141	2005–present

Overtime goals
#	Player	OTG	Seasons
1	Alexander Ovechkin	27	2005–present
2	Nicklas Backstrom	9	2007–2023
3	Mike Green	8	2005–2015
3	Evgeny Kuznetsov	8	2014–2024
5	Dmitry Orlov	5	2011–2023
Active leader
1	Alexander Ovechkin	27	2005–present

Highest +/-
#	Player	+/-	Seasons
1	Rod Langway	116	1982–1993
2	John Carlson	114	2009–2026
3	Dmitry Orlov	104	2011–2023
4	Scott Stevens	90	1982–1990
5	Joe Reekie	86	1994–2002
Active leader
19	Alex Ovechkin	55	2005–present

Points per game
#	Player	P/G	Seasons
1	Dennis Maruk	1.26	1978–1983
2	Alexander Ovechkin	1.07	2005–present
3	Jaromir Jagr	1.06	2001–2004
4	Peter Bondra	1.04	1990–2004
5	Robert Lang	.99	2002–2004
Active leader
2	Alexander Ovechkin	1.07	2005–present

=== Goaltenders ===
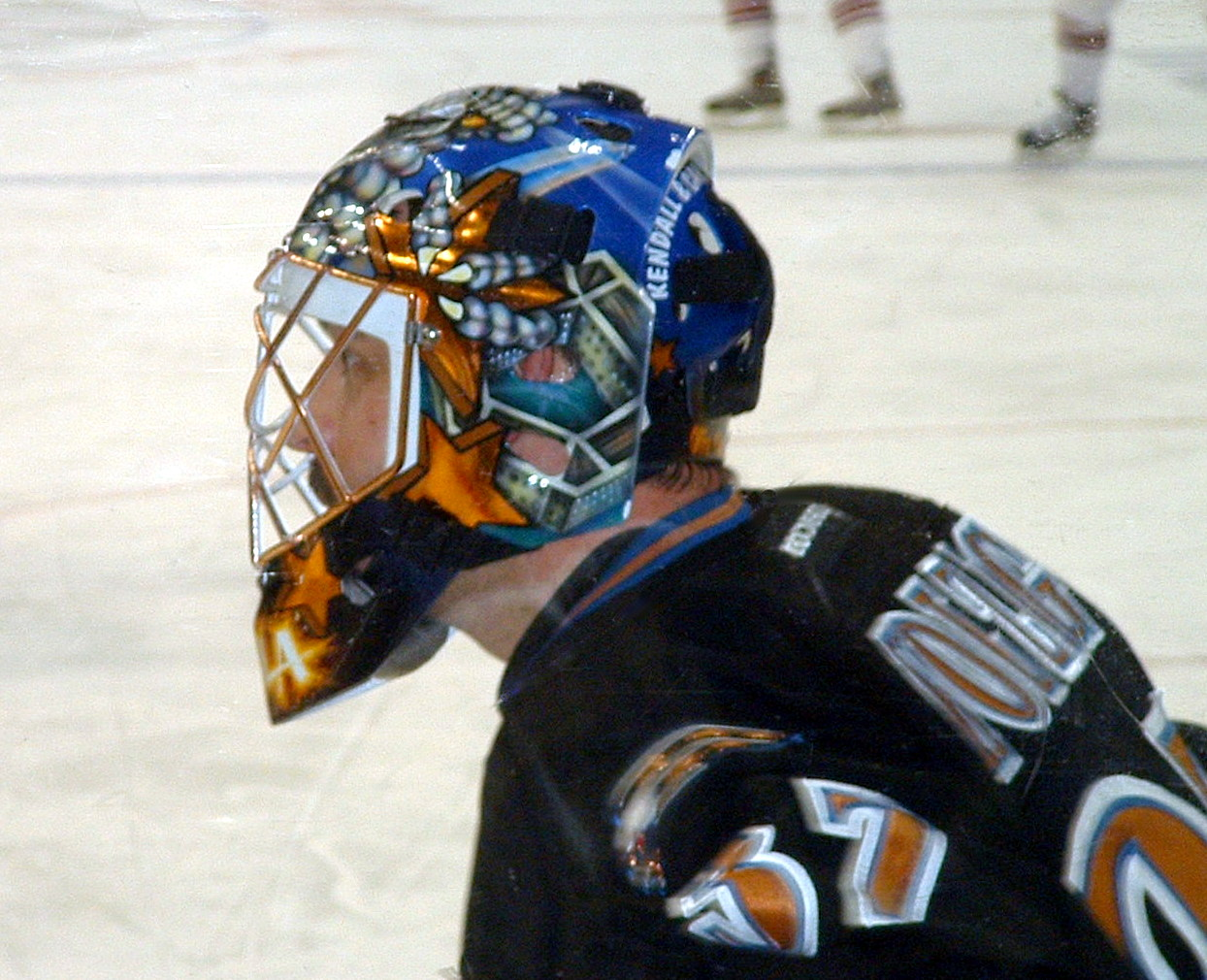
Olaf Kölzig holds 14 of 24 goaltending records.

Games played
#	Player	GP	Seasons
1	Olaf Kolzig	711	1989–2008
2	Braden Holtby	468	2010–2019
3	Don Beaupre	269	1989–1994
4	Al Jensen	173	1981–1987
5	Ron Low	145	1974–1977
Active leader
7	Charlie Lindgren	141	2022–present

Wins
#	Player	W	Seasons
1	Olaf Kolzig	301	1989–2008
2	Braden Holtby	282	2010–2019
3	Don Beaupre	128	1989–1994
4	Al Jensen	94	1981–1987
5	Jim Carey	70	1995–1997
Active leader
7	Charlie Lindgren	67	2022–present

Losses
#	Player	L	Seasons
1	Olaf Kolzig	293	1989–2008
2	Braden Holtby	122	2010–2019
3	Don Beaupre	96	1989–1994
4	Ron Low	94	1974–1977
5	Bernie Wolfe	61	1975–1979
Active leader
6	Charlie Lindgren	49	2022–present

Ties
#	Player	T	Seasons
1	Olaf Kolzig	63	1989–2008
2	Don Beaupre	27	1989–1994
3	Bernie Wolfe	21	1975–1979
4	Pat Riggin	19	1982–1985
5	Al Jensen	18	1981–1987
Active leader
N/A	--	--	--

Overtime/shootout losses
#	Player	OTL	Seasons
1	Braden Holtby	46	2010–2019
2	Olaf Kolzig	23	1989–2008
3	Charlie Lindgren	16	2022–present
4	Michal Neuvirth	13	2009–2014
5	Jose Theodore	12	2008–2010
Active leader
3	Charlie Lindgren	16	2022–present

Goals against average
#	Player	GAA	Seasons
1	Philipp Grubauer	2.29	2013–2018
2	Jim Carey	2.37	1995–1997
3	Logan Thompson	2.46	2024-present
4	Braden Holtby	2.53	2010–2019
5	Michal Neuvirth	2.67	2009–2014
Active leader
3	Logan Thompson	2.46	2024-present

- Minimum 75 games

Save percentage
#	Player	SV%	Seasons
1	Philipp Grubauer	.923	2013–2018
2	Braden Holtby	.916	2010–2019
3	Logan Thompson	.911	2024-present
4	Michal Neuvirth	.910	2009–2014
5	Vitek Vanecek	.908	2020–2022
Active leader
3	Logan Thompson	.911	2024-present

- Minimum 75 games

Shutouts
#	Player	SO	Seasons
1	Braden Holtby	35	2010–2019
1	Olaf Kolzig	35	1989–2008
3	Jim Carey	14	1995–1997
4	Don Beaupre	12	1989–1994
5	Al Jensen	8	1981–1987
Active leader
5	Charlie Lindgren	8	2022–present

== Individual playoff records ==
=== Skaters ===
Games played
#	Player	GP	Seasons
1	Alexander Ovechkin	147	2005–present
2	Nicklas Backstrom	139	2007–present
3	John Carlson	123	2009–present
4	Dale Hunter	100	1987–1999
4	Kelly Miller	100	1986–1999
Active leader
1	Alexander Ovechkin	147	2005–present

Goals
#	Player	G	Seasons
1	Alexander Ovechkin	72	2005–present
2	Nicklas Backstrom	38	2007–present
3	Peter Bondra	30	1990–2004
4	T.J. Oshie	29	2015–present
4	Evgeny Kuznetsov	29	2014–2024
Active leader
1	Alexander Ovechkin	72	2005–present

Assists
#	Player	A	Seasons
1	Nicklas Backstrom	76	2007–present
2	Alexander Ovechkin	69	2005–present
3	John Carlson	54	2009–present
4	Dale Hunter	47	1987–1999
5	Scott Stevens	44	1982–1990
Active leader
1	Nicklas Backstrom	762	2007–present

Points
#	Player	Pts	Seasons
1	Alexander Ovechkin	141	2005–present
2	Nicklas Backstrom	114	2007–present
3	John Carlson	73	2009–present
4	Dale Hunter	72	1987–1999
5	Evgeny Kuznetsov	67	2014–2024
Active leader
1	Alexander Ovechkin	141	2005–present

=== Goaltenders ===
Games played
#	Player	GP	Seasons
1	Braden Holtby	97	2010–2019
2	Olaf Kolzig	45	1989–2008
3	Don Beaupre	36	1989–1994
4	Pete Peeters	30	1981–1987
5	Semyon Varlamov	19	2008–2011
Active leader
N/A	--	--	--

Wins
#	Player	W	Seasons
1	Braden Holtby	50	2010–2019
2	Olaf Kolzig	20	1989–2008
3	Don Beaupre	18	1989–1994
4	Pete Peeters	15	1981–1987
5	Semyon Varlamov	10	2008–2011
Active leader
N/A	--	--	--

Goals against average
#	Player	GAA	Seasons
1	Braden Holtby	2.13	2010–2019
2	Olaf Kolzig	2.14	1989–2008
3	Semyon Varlamov	2.49	2008–2011
4	Don Beaupre	2.98	1989–1994
5	Pete Peeters	3.15	1981–1987
Active leader
N/A	--	--	--

Save percentage
#	Player	SV%	Seasons
2	Olaf Kolzig	.927	1989–2008
1	Braden Holtby	.926	2010–2019
3	Semyon Varlamov	.915	2008–2011
4	Don Beaupre	.896	1989–1994
5	Pete Peeters	.888	1981–1987
Active leader
N/A	--	--	--

Shutouts
#	Player	SO	Seasons
1	Braden Holtby	7	2010–2019
2	Olaf Kolzig	6	1989–2008
3	Semyon Varlamov	2	2008–2011
4	Don Beaupre	2	1989–1994
Active leader
N/A	--	--	--

== Single season records ==
=== Skaters ===
Goals
#	Player	G	Season
1	Alexander Ovechkin	65	2007–08
2	Dennis Maruk	60	1981–82
3	Alexander Ovechkin	56	2008–09
4	Bobby Carpenter	53	1984–85
5	Alexander Ovechkin	53	2014–15

Assists
#	Player	A	Season
1	Dennis Maruk	76	1981-82
2	Adam Oates	69	2000-01
3	Nicklas Backstrom	68	2009-10
4	Nicklas Backstrom	66	2008–09
5	Michal Pivonka	65	1995–96

Points
#	Player	P	Season
1	Dennis Maruk	136	1981-82
2	Alexander Ovechkin	112	2007–08
3	Alexander Ovechkin	110	2008–09
4	Alexander Ovechkin	109	2009–10
5	Alexander Ovechkin	106	2005–06

Points (Defenseman)
#	Player	Pts	Season
1	Larry Murphy	81	1986–87
2	Kevin Hatcher	79	1992–93
3	Mike Green	76	2009–10
4	John Carlson	75	2019–20
5	Kevin Hatcher	74	1990–91

Points (rookie)
#	Player	Pts	Season
1	Alexander Ovechkin	106	2005–06
2	Nicklas Backstrom	69	2007–08
2	Bobby Carpenter	67	1981–82
4	Chris Valentine	67	1981–82
5	Bengt-Åke Gustafsson	60	1979–80

Penalty in minutes
#	Player	PIM	Season
1	Alan May	339	1989–90
2	Craig Berube	305	1993–94
3	Neil Sheehy	291	1989–90
4	Scott Stevens	283	1986–87
5	Randy Holt	275	1982–83

Highest +/-
#	Player	+/-	Season
1	Jeff Schultz	50	2009–10
2	Alexander Ovechkin	45	2009–10
3	Mike Green	39	2009–10
4	Nicklas Backstrom	37	2009–10
5	Rod Langway	36	1984–85

=== Goaltenders ===
Games played
#	Player	GP	Season
1	Olaf Kolzig	73	1999–2000
2	Braden Holtby	73	2014–15
3	Olaf Kolzig	72	2000–01
4	Jim Carey	71	1995–96
5	Olaf Kolzig	71	2001–02

Wins
#	Player	W	Season
1	Braden Holtby	48	2015–16
2	Braden Holtby	42	2016–17
3	Olaf Kolzig	41	1999–2000
4	Braden Hotlby	41	2014–15
5	Olaf Kolzig	23	2000–01

Losses
#	Player	L	Season
1	Ron Low	36	1974–75
2	Olaf Kolzig	35	2003–04
3	Ron Low	31	1975–76
4	Olaf Kolzig	31	1998–99
5	Olaf Kolzig	29	2001–02

Goals against average
#	Player	GAA	Season
1	Philipp Grubauer	2.04	2016–17
2	Braden Holtby	2.07	2016–17
3	Jim Carey	2.13	1994–95
4	Olaf Kolzig	2.20	1997–98
5	Braden Holtby	2.20	2015–16

Save percentage
#	Player	SV%	Season
1	Philipp Grubauer	.927	2016–17
2	Braden Holtby	.925	2016–17
3	Semyon Varlamov	.924	2010–11
4	Philipp Grubauer	.923	2017–18
5	Braden Holtby	.923	2014–15

Shutouts
#	Player	SO	Season
1	Braden Holtby	9	2016–17
2	Jim Carey	9	1995–96
3	Braden Holtby	9	2014–15
4	Charlie Lindgren	6	2023–24
5	Olaf Kolzig	6	2001–02

== Team records ==
(* = The 1994–95 season is excluded from this record, due to the fact a labor lockout shortened the season to 48 games)

- Most points in a season: 121 (2009–10)
- Fewest points in a season: 21 (1974–75)
- Most wins in a season: 56 (2015–16)
- Fewest wins in a season: 8 (1974–75)
- Highest winning percentage in a season: .682 (2015–16)
- Lowest winning percentage in a season: .131 (1974–75)
- Most regulation losses in a season: 67 (1974–75)
- Fewest regulation losses in a season: 15 (2009–10)
- Most ties in a season: 18 (1980–81)
- Most overtime losses in a season: 14 (2006–07)
- Most goals scored in a season: 330 (1991–92)
- Fewest goals scored in a season: 181 (1974–75)*
- Most goals per game scored in a season: 4.125 (1991–92)
- Fewest goals allowed in a season: 194 (1999–00)*
- Most goals allowed in a season: 446 (1974–75)
- Most penalty minutes in a season: 2204 (1989–90)
- Fewest penalty minutes in a season: 994 (1999–00)
- Most consecutive wins: 14 (2009–10)
- Most consecutive wins to start the season: 7 (2011–12)

== NHL records ==
- Most goals by a left winger in a season: Alexander Ovechkin, 65 (2007–08)
- Most wins by a goalie in a season (tied): Braden Holtby, 48 (2015–16)
- Most consecutive games with a goal by a defenseman: Mike Green, 8 (2008–09)
- Lowest plus minus in a career: Rick Green: -137
- Lowest plus minus in a season: Bill Mikkelson, –82 (1974–75)
- Fewest wins by a team in a season, minimum 70 games played, 8 (1974–75)
- Lowest winning percentage by a team in a season, minimum 70 games played, .131 (1974–75)
- Most NHL goal scoring titles in a career Alexander Ovechkin 9
- Most goals by a European born player in a career Alexander Ovechkin 868
- Most power play goals in a career Alexander Ovechkin 316
- Most empty net goals in a career Alexander Ovechkin 59
- Most road (away) goals in a career Alexander Ovechkin 443
- Most shots on goal in a career Alexander Ovechkin 6690
- Most goals in a career for a single team Alexander Ovechkin 868
- Most 40-goal seasons in a career Alexander Ovechkin 13
- Most 30-goal seasons in a career Alexander Ovechkin 18
- Most overtime goals in a career Alexander Ovechkin 26
