= List of Washington Capitals award winners =

Washington Capitals awards
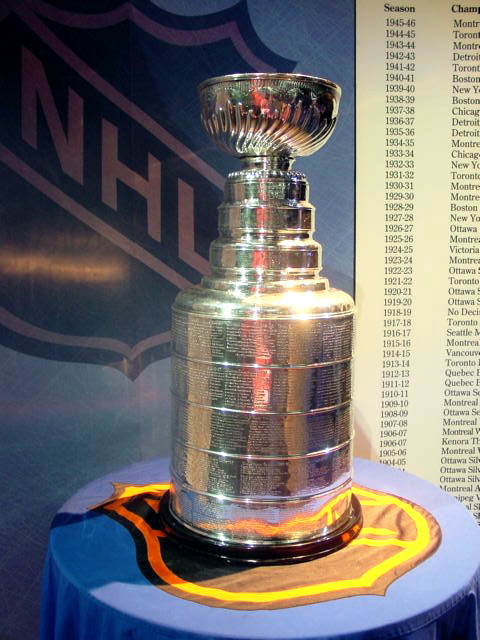
- The Washington Capitals have won the Stanley Cup (above) one time.

Team trophies
- Award*: Wins
- Stanley Cup: 1
- Prince of Wales Trophy: 2
- Presidents' Trophy: 3

Individual awards
- Award*: Wins
- Art Ross Trophy: 1
- Bill Masterton Memorial Trophy: 1
- Calder Memorial Trophy: 1
- Charlie Conacher Memorial Trophy: 1
- Conn Smythe Trophy: 1
- Frank J. Selke Trophy: 1
- Hart Memorial Trophy: 3
- Jack Adams Award: 4
- James Norris Memorial Trophy: 2
- King Clancy Memorial Trophy: 1
- Lester Patrick Trophy: 1
- Mark Messier Leadership Award: 1
- Maurice "Rocket" Richard Trophy: 9
- NHL Foundation Player Award: 1
- Ted Lindsay Award: 3
- Vezina Trophy: 3
- William M. Jennings Trophy: 2

Total
- Awards won: 42

This is a list of Washington Capitals award winners.

== League awards ==
=== Team trophies ===
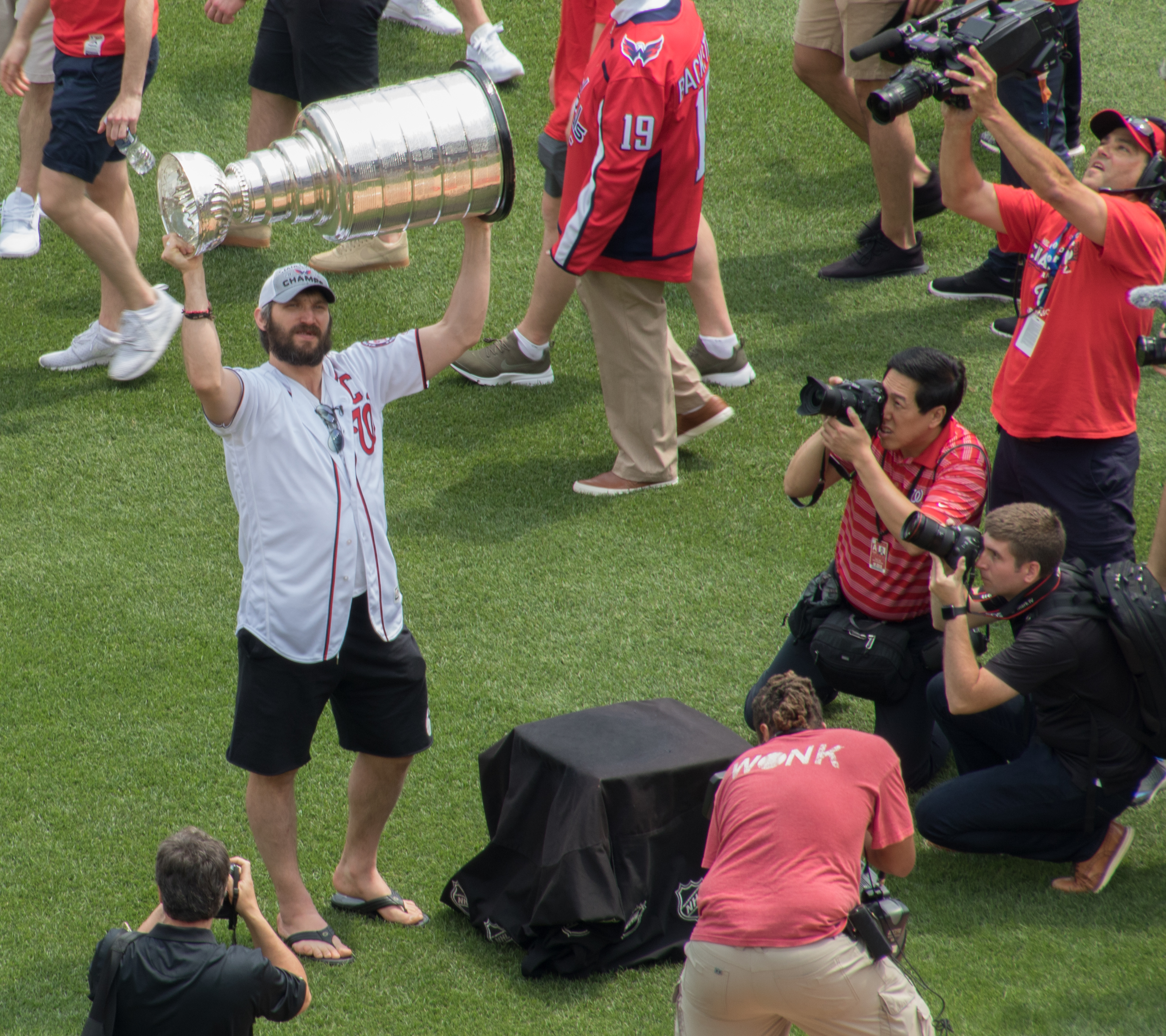
Alex Ovechkin celebrating with the Stanley Cup at Nationals Park while attending a Nationals game

Team trophies awarded to the Washington Capitals
Award	Description	Times won	Seasons	References
Stanley Cup	NHL championship	1	2017–18	
Prince of Wales Trophy	Eastern Conference playoff championship	2	1997–98, 2017–18	
Presidents' Trophy	Most regular season points	3	2009–10, 2015–16, 2016–17	

=== Individual awards ===
Individual awards won by Washington Capitals players and staff
Award	Description	Winner	Season	References
Art Ross Trophy	Regular season scoring champion	Alexander Ovechkin	2007–08	
Bill Masterton Memorial Trophy	Perseverance, sportsmanship and dedication to hockey	Jose Theodore	2009–10	
Calder Memorial Trophy	Rookie of the year	Alexander Ovechkin	2005–06	
Conn Smythe Trophy	Most valuable player of the playoffs	Alexander Ovechkin	2017–18	
Frank J. Selke Trophy	Forward who best excels in the defensive aspect of the game	Doug Jarvis	1983–84	
Hart Memorial Trophy	Most valuable player to his team during the regular season	Alexander Ovechkin	2007–08	
Hart Memorial Trophy	Most valuable player to his team during the regular season	Alexander Ovechkin	2008–09	
Hart Memorial Trophy	Most valuable player to his team during the regular season	Alexander Ovechkin	2012–13	
Jack Adams Award	Top coach during the regular season	Bryan Murray	1983–84	
Jack Adams Award	Top coach during the regular season	Bruce Boudreau	2007–08	
Jack Adams Award	Top coach during the regular season	Barry Trotz	2015–16	
Jack Adams Award	Top coach during the regular season	Spencer Carbery	2024–25	
James Norris Memorial Trophy	Top defenseman during the regular season	Rod Langway	1982–83	
James Norris Memorial Trophy	Top defenseman during the regular season	Rod Langway	1983–84	
King Clancy Memorial Trophy	Leadership qualities on and off the ice and humanitarian contributions within their community	Olaf Kolzig	2005–06	
Mark Messier Leadership Award	Leadership and contributions to society	Alexander Ovechkin	2024–25	
Maurice "Rocket" Richard Trophy	Most goals in the regular season	Alexander Ovechkin	2007–08	
Maurice "Rocket" Richard Trophy	Most goals in the regular season	Alexander Ovechkin	2008–09	
Maurice "Rocket" Richard Trophy	Most goals in the regular season	Alexander Ovechkin	2012–13	
Maurice "Rocket" Richard Trophy	Most goals in the regular season	Alexander Ovechkin	2013–14	
Maurice "Rocket" Richard Trophy	Most goals in the regular season	Alexander Ovechkin	2014–15	
Maurice "Rocket" Richard Trophy	Most goals in the regular season	Alexander Ovechkin	2015–16	
Maurice "Rocket" Richard Trophy	Most goals in the regular season	Alexander Ovechkin	2017–18	
Maurice "Rocket" Richard Trophy	Most goals in the regular season	Alexander Ovechkin	2018–19	
Maurice "Rocket" Richard Trophy	Most goals in the regular season	Alexander Ovechkin	2019–20 (Note: Shared with David Pastrnak of the Boston Bruins.)	
NHL Foundation Player Award	Community service	Olaf Kolzig	2000–01	
Ted Lindsay Award	Most valuable player as chosen by the players	Alexander Ovechkin	2007–08	
Ted Lindsay Award	Most valuable player as chosen by the players	Alexander Ovechkin	2008–09	
Ted Lindsay Award	Most valuable player as chosen by the players	Alexander Ovechkin	2009–10	
Vezina Trophy	Top goaltender	Jim Carey	1995–96	
Vezina Trophy	Top goaltender	Olaf Kolzig	1999–2000	
Vezina Trophy	Top goaltender	Braden Holtby	2015–16	
William M. Jennings Trophy	Fewest goals given up in the regular season	Al Jensen	1983–84	
William M. Jennings Trophy	Fewest goals given up in the regular season	Pat Riggin	1983–84	
William M. Jennings Trophy	Fewest goals given up in the regular season	Braden Holtby	2016–17	

== All-Stars ==
=== NHL first and second team All-Stars ===
The NHL first and second team All-Stars are the top players at each position as voted on by the Professional Hockey Writers' Association.

Washington Capitals selected to the NHL First and Second Team All-Stars
Player	Position	Selections	Season	Team
Jim Carey	Goaltender	1	1995–96	1st
John Carlson	Defense	2	2018–19	2nd
John Carlson	Defense	2	2019–20	1st
Sergei Gonchar	Defense	2	2001–02	2nd
Sergei Gonchar	Defense	2	2002–03	2nd
Mike Green	Defense	2	2008–09	1st
Mike Green	Defense	2	2009–10	1st
Braden Holtby	Goaltender	2	2015–16	1st
Braden Holtby	Goaltender	2	2016–17	2nd
Al Iafrate	Defense	1	1992–93	2nd
Olaf Kolzig	Goaltender	1	1999–2000	1st
Rod Langway	Defense	3	1982–83	1st
Rod Langway	Defense	3	1983–84	1st
Rod Langway	Defense	3	1984–85	2nd
Larry Murphy	Defense	1	1986–87	2nd
Alexander Ovechkin	Left wing	12	2005–06	1st
Alexander Ovechkin	Left wing	12	2006–07	1st
Alexander Ovechkin	Left wing	12	2007–08	1st
Alexander Ovechkin	Left wing	12	2008–09	1st
Alexander Ovechkin	Left wing	12	2009–10	1st
Alexander Ovechkin	Left wing	12	2010–11	2nd
Alexander Ovechkin	Right wing	12	2012–13	1st
Alexander Ovechkin	Left wing	12	2012–13	2nd
Alexander Ovechkin	Right wing	12	2013–14	2nd
Alexander Ovechkin	Left wing	12	2014–15	1st
Alexander Ovechkin	Left wing	12	2015–16	2nd
Alexander Ovechkin	Left wing	12	2018–19	1st
Pat Riggin	Goaltender	1	1983–84	2nd
Scott Stevens	Defense	1	1987–88	1st
Logan Thompson	Goaltender	1	2025–26	2nd

=== NHL All-Rookie Team ===
The NHL All-Rookie Team consists of the top rookies at each position as voted on by the Professional Hockey Writers' Association.

Washington Capitals selected to the NHL All-Rookie Team
Player	Position	Season
Nicklas Backstrom	Forward	2007–08
Jim Carey	Goaltender	1994–95
John Carlson	Defense	2010–11
Alexander Ovechkin	Forward	2005–06
Scott Stevens	Defense	1982–83

=== All-Star Game selections ===
The National Hockey League All-Star Game is a mid-season exhibition game held annually between many of the top players of each season. Thirty-seven All-Star Games have been held since the Washington Capitals entered the league in 1974, with at least one player chosen to represent the Capitals in each year. The All-Star game has not been held in various years: 1979 and 1987 due to the 1979 Challenge Cup and Rendez-vous '87 series between the NHL and the Soviet national team, respectively, 1995, 2005, and 2013 as a result of labor stoppages, 2006, 2010, 2014 and 2026 because of the Winter Olympic Games, 2021 as a result of the COVID-19 pandemic, and 2025 when it was replaced by the 2025 4 Nations Face-Off. Washington has hosted one of the games. The 34th took place at the Capital Centre.

- † Selected by fan vote
- # Selected as one of four "last men in" by fan vote
- ‡ Selected by Commissioner

Washington Capitals players and coaches selected to the All-Star Game
Game	Year	Name	Position	References
28th	1975	Denis Dupere	Left wing	
29th	1976	Bill Clement	Center	
30th	1977	Guy Charron	Center	
31st	1978	Bob Sirois	Right wing	
32nd	1980	Robert Picard	Defense	
33rd	1981	Mike Gartner	Right wing	
34th	1982	Dennis Maruk	Center	
35th	1983	Rod Langway	Defense	
36th	1984	Al Jensen (Did not play)	Goaltender	
36th	1984	Rod Langway	Defense	
37th	1985	Bobby Carpenter	Center	
37th	1985	Mike Gartner	Right wing	
37th	1985	Rod Langway	Defense	
37th	1985	Scott Stevens	Defense	
38th	1986	Mike Gartner	Right wing	
38th	1986	Rod Langway†	Defense	
39th	1988	Mike Gartner	Right wing	
40th	1989	Mike Ridley	Center	
40th	1989	Scott Stevens	Defense	
41st	1990	Kevin Hatcher	Defense	
42nd	1991	Kevin Hatcher	Defense	
43rd	1992	Don Beaupre	Goaltender	
43rd	1992	Randy Burridge	Left wing	
43rd	1992	Kevin Hatcher	Defense	
44th	1993	Peter Bondra	Right wing	
44th	1993	Al Iafrate	Defense	
45th	1994	Al Iafrate	Defense	
46th	1996	Peter Bondra	Right wing	
47th	1997	Peter Bondra	Right wing	
47th	1997	Dale Hunter‡	Center	
48th	1998	Peter Bondra	Right wing	
48th	1998	Olaf Kolzig	Goaltender	
49th	1999	Peter Bondra	Right wing	
50th	2000	Olaf Kolzig	Goaltender	
51st	2001	Sergei Gonchar	Defense	
52nd	2002	Sergei Gonchar	Defense	
52nd	2002	Jaromir Jagr†	Right wing	
53rd	2003	Sergei Gonchar	Defense	
53rd	2003	Jaromir Jagr†	Right wing	
54th	2004	Robert Lang	Center	
55th	2007	Alexander Ovechkin†	Left wing	
56th	2008	Alexander Ovechkin	Left wing	
57th	2009	Alexander Ovechkin	Left wing	
58th	2011	Mike Green	Defense	
58th	2011	Alexander Ovechkin	Left wing	
59th	2012	Alexander Ovechkin (Did not play)	Left wing	
59th	2012	Dennis Wideman	Defense	
60th	2015	Alexander Ovechkin	Left wing	
61st	2016	Nicklas Backstrom	Center	
61st	2016	Braden Holtby	Goaltender	
61st	2016	Evgeny Kuznetsov (Replaced Ovechkin)	Center	
61st	2016	Alexander Ovechkin† (Did not play)	Left wing	
61st	2016	Barry Trotz	Coach	
62nd	2017	Braden Holtby	Goaltender	
62nd	2017	Alexander Ovechkin	Left wing	
63rd	2018	Braden Holtby	Goaltender	
63rd	2018	Alexander Ovechkin†	Left wing	
63rd	2018	Barry Trotz	Coach	
64th	2019	John Carlson	Defense	
64th	2019	Braden Holtby	Goaltender	
64th	2019	Alexander Ovechkin† (Did not play)	Left wing	
64th	2019	Todd Reirden	Coach	
65th	2020	John Carlson	Defense	
65th	2020	Braden Holtby	Goaltender	
65th	2020	T. J. Oshie#	Right wing	
65th	2020	Alexander Ovechkin† (Did not play)	Left wing	
65th	2020	Todd Reirden	Coach	
66th	2022	Evgeny Kuznetsov (Replaced Adam Fox)	Center	
66th	2022	Alexander Ovechkin† (Did not play)	Left wing	
66th	2022	Tom Wilson (Replaced Ovechkin)	Right wing	
67th	2023	Alexander Ovechkin	Left wing	
68th	2024	Tom Wilson	Right wing	

=== All-Star Game replacement events ===
Washington Capitals players and coaches selected to All-Star Game replacement events
Event	Year	Name	Position	References
Challenge Cup	1979	Robert Picard (Did not play)	Defense	
Rendez-vous '87	1987	Rod Langway	Defense	

== Career achievements ==
=== Hockey Hall of Fame ===
The following is a list of Washington Capitals who have been enshrined in the Hockey Hall of Fame.

Washington Capitals inducted into the Hockey Hall of Fame
Individual	Category	Year inducted	Years with Capitals in category	References
Zdeno Chára	Player	2025	2020–2021	
Dino Ciccarelli	Player	2010	1989–1992	
Sergei Fedorov	Player	2015	2008–2009	
Mike Gartner	Player	2001	1979–1989	
Phil Housley	Player	2015	1996–1998	
Rod Langway	Player	2002	1982–1993	
Larry Murphy	Player	2004	1983–1989	
Adam Oates	Player	2012	1997–2002	
Scott Stevens	Player	2007	1982–1990	

=== Foster Hewitt Memorial Award ===
One member of the Washington Capitals organization has been honored with the Foster Hewitt Memorial Award. The award is presented by the Hockey Hall of Fame to members of the radio and television industry who make outstanding contributions to their profession and the game of ice hockey during their broadcasting career.

Members of the Washington Capitals honored with the Foster Hewitt Memorial Award
Individual	Year honored	Years with Capitals as broadcaster	References
Ron Weber	2010	1974–1997	

=== Lester Patrick Trophy ===
The Lester Patrick Trophy has been presented by the National Hockey League and USA Hockey since 1966 to honor a recipient's contribution to ice hockey in the United States. This list includes all personnel who have ever been employed by the Washington Capitals in any capacity and have also received the Lester Patrick Trophy.

Members of the Washington Capitals honored with the Lester Patrick Trophy
Individual	Year honored	Years with Capitals	References
Phil Housley	2008	1996–1998	
David Poile	2001	1982–1997	
Milt Schmidt	1996	1973–1975	

=== United States Hockey Hall of Fame ===
Members of the Washington Capitals inducted into the United States Hockey Hall of Fame
Individual	Year inducted	Years with Capitals	References
Bobby Carpenter	2007	1981–1987	
Dave Christian	2001	1983–1989	
Kevin Hatcher	2010	1985–1994	
Phil Housley	2004	1996–1998	
Rod Langway	1999	1982–1993	
Craig Patrick	1996	1977–1979	
David Poile	2018	1982–1997	
Ron Wilson	2017	1997–2002	

=== Retired numbers ===
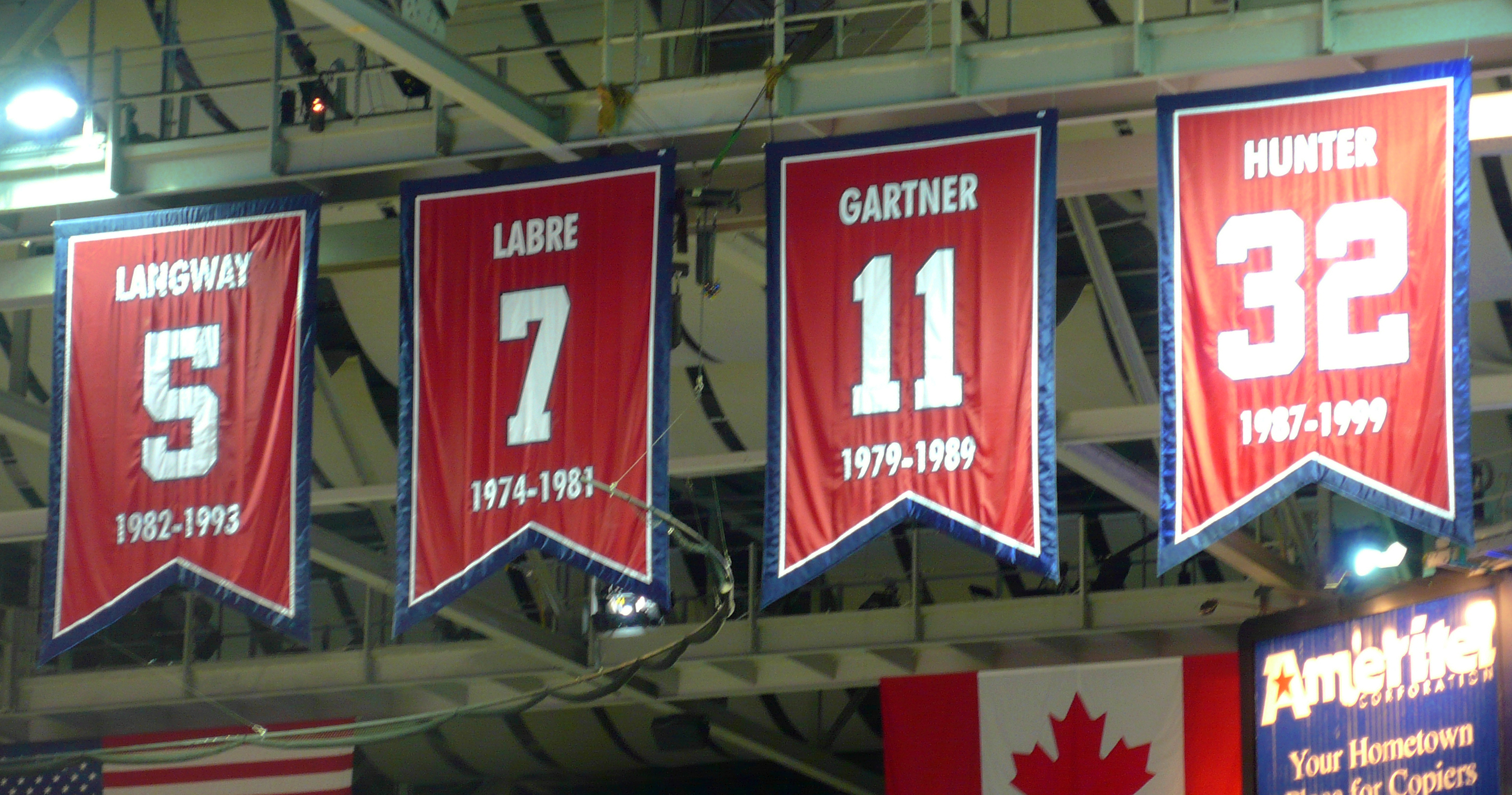
The Capitals honor the retired numbers of Rod Langway, Yvon Labre, Mike Gartner and Dale Hunter with banners in the Capital One Arena.

The Washington Capitals have retired four of their jersey numbers. Also out of circulation is the number 99 which was retired league-wide for Wayne Gretzky on February 6, 2000. Gretzky did not play for the Capitals during his 20-year NHL career and no Capitals player had ever worn the number 99 prior to its retirement.

Washington Capitals retired numbers
Number	Player	Position	Years with Capitals as a player	Date of retirement ceremony	References
5	Rod Langway	Defense	1982–1993	November 26, 1997	
7	Yvon Labre	Defense	1974–1981	November 7, 1981	
11	Mike Gartner	Right wing	1979–1989	December 28, 2008	
32	Dale Hunter	Center	1987–1999	March 11, 2000	

== Other awards ==
Washington Capitals who have received non-NHL awards
Award	Description	Winner	Season	References
E.J. McGuire Award of Excellence	Awarded annually to the National Hockey League draft prospect who best exemplifies the "commitment to excellence through strength of character, competitiveness and athleticism" as selected by NHL Central Scouting at the NHL entry draft.	Brett Leason	2019	
Charlie Conacher Humanitarian Award	For humanitarian or community service projects	Bryan Watson	1977–78	
Golden Hockey Stick	Best Czech ice hockey player	Jaromir Jagr	2001–02	
Kharlamov Trophy	Most valuable Russian player in NHL	Alexander Ovechkin	2005–06	
Kharlamov Trophy	Most valuable Russian player in NHL	Alexander Ovechkin	2006–07	
Kharlamov Trophy	Most valuable Russian player in NHL	Alexander Ovechkin	2007–08	
Kharlamov Trophy	Most valuable Russian player in NHL	Alexander Ovechkin	2008–09	
Kharlamov Trophy	Most valuable Russian player in NHL	Alexander Ovechkin	2009–10	
Kharlamov Trophy	Most valuable Russian player in NHL	Alexander Ovechkin	2013–14	
Kharlamov Trophy	Most valuable Russian player in NHL	Alexander Ovechkin	2014–15	
Kharlamov Trophy	Most valuable Russian player in NHL	Alexander Ovechkin	2017–18	
Viking Award	Most valuable Swedish player in NHL	Calle Johansson	1991–92	
Viking Award	Most valuable Swedish player in NHL	Nicklas Backstrom	2008–09	
Viking Award	Most valuable Swedish player in NHL	Nicklas Backstrom	2014–15	

== See also ==
- List of National Hockey League awards
