= 1992 NHL expansion draft =

Player selection draft

General information
- Date: June 18, 1992
- Location: Montreal, Quebec, Canada

Overview
- League: National Hockey League
- Expansion teams: Ottawa Senators; Tampa Bay Lightning
- Expansion season: 1992–93

The 1992 NHL expansion draft was an expansion draft held by the National Hockey League (NHL) to fill the rosters of the league's two expansion teams for the 1992–93 season, the Ottawa Senators and the Tampa Bay Lightning. The draft was held on June 18, 1992, in Montreal, Quebec, Canada.

== Background ==
In the 1960s and 1970s, the National Hockey League (NHL) saw a series of franchise expansions, culminating in the 1979 NHL expansion draft that coincided with the collapse of the NHL's chief competitor, the World Hockey Association. However, a number of those expansion teams failed and were relocated, ending with the relocation of the Colorado Rockies in 1982–83 to New Jersey. Following that move, the NHL remained relatively stable for the remainder of the 1980s, which sparked a new interest in expansion in the late 1980s by the NHL owners with plans to go from the existing 21 teams to 30 by the end of the 1990s. On April 6, 1989, it was announced that a report on expansion was to be presented to the NHL Board of Governors at their meeting in December. The league opted to expand and a new franchise was awarded to San Jose. The league then chose to expand by a further two locations, and eleven competitors submitted bids. One group based in Milwaukee chose to withdraw after the NHL announced that the expansion fee would be $50 million. Two winners were selected from the ten remaining groups; Ottawa, Hamilton, Phoenix, Houston, Seattle, San Diego, Anaheim, Tampa, St. Petersburg, and Miami. Ottawa and Tampa were awarded the new franchises primarily because they were the only ones who submitted bids that accepted all the conditions the NHL placed on the bidders. The expansion draft was to be league president John Ziegler's last act, as he had announced his departure.

== Rules ==
A total of 21 of the 22 franchises in the league at the time of the draft were allowed to protect two goaltenders and fourteen position players. The San Jose Sharks were the only team exempt from protection restrictions as they were an expansion team the previous season. First and second-year players were not eligible to be selected. To be exposed in the draft, position players had to have played at least 40 games in the 1991–92 season or 70 games over the previous two and goaltenders had to have played a minimum of 60 minutes in the NHL.

The seven teams which had lost a defenseman in the preceding 1991 expansion draft (Boston Bruins, Calgary Flames, Chicago Blackhawks, Edmonton Oilers, Hartford Whalers, Montreal Canadiens, and Toronto Maple Leafs) could not lose one in this draft. However, they still had to protect the same number of defenseman as they had protected in the previous expansion draft, minus one.

Any team that had lost a goaltender in the 1991 expansion draft was exempt from making any of their goaltenders available in this draft. Every other team had to make available at least one goaltender. As teams knew this rule far in advance, and that a goaltender had to play only 60 minutes to be exposed, this led to several trades so they could fulfill the requirement without exposing their lead goaltenders. It also led to anomalies such as Ray LeBlanc (the star of the 1992 United States Olympic team) being put into the only NHL game of his career so that the Chicago Blackhawks could expose him and not Ed Belfour, Dominik Hašek, or Jimmy Waite. Meanwhile, the Washington Capitals re-signed former goalie Bernie Wolfe, who was 40 years old and last played an NHL game in 1979, in order to protect its lineup of Don Beaupre, Jim Hrivnak, and Olaf Kölzig. However, league president John Ziegler held up approval of the contract and summoned Capitals general manager David Poile to the NHL's headquarters in Toronto to explain himself. Taking this as a sign the contract would be rejected and unwilling to risk being sanctioned, the team signed Steve Weeks instead. Phil Esposito, the president and general manager of the Lightning, was quoted as saying about the incident: "I didn't just pay $50 million for Bernie Wolfe. He wasn't any good when I played against him."

Teams could make trades prior to the draft in order to protect players until the draft took place. Side deals between existing and expansion franchises to affect actual draft selection was prohibited. That did not stop the teams from making those deals, as Ottawa made two. The expansion teams were given a provisional copy of the players available prior to the draft, but a final copy was only submitted to the teams on the draft floor. There were 42 players selected in the draft, two from each participating franchise. The Lightning and Senators were each to pick two goaltenders, seven defensemen, and twelve forwards. The goaltenders were selected first, followed by the defensemen and then the forwards.

== Draft ==
Ahead of the draft, those selecting commented on the poor level of talent made available. Esposito called the players available in the draft "not very good ones" and intended to trade some of those selected immediately in exchange for younger players. John Ferguson, the director of player personnel for the Senators, stated that the teams were being offered "snow in winter". The draft took place in the Regence Ballroom of the Radisson Gouverneurs Hotel in Montreal on June 18, 1992, and who selected first was decided by a coin toss on May 28, with Ottawa winning the right to have priority selection on goaltenders and forwards, while Tampa would have priority selection on defensemen.

The Senators had prepared their draft list using an Apple laptop. However, no one had checked to see if the laptop had been charged and on the day of the draft, the computer's battery was found to be dead. Furthermore, the Senators did not open the final list provided to them. Mel Bridgman, general manager of the Senators, took goaltender Peter Sidorkiewicz with his first selection. The New York Rangers wanted to protect their lineup and had goaltender Mark Laforest available. They made a side deal with Ottawa, initially offering two young prospects if Ottawa selected Laforest, however, they changed their mind and instead wanted a draft pick in the 1992 NHL entry draft back from Ottawa for the two prospects. While the entire room waited, the Senators, missing their draft list, debated at their table, eventually coming to an agreement with the Rangers to acquire one prospect and their ninth round selection in the 1992 entry draft in exchange for selecting Laforest. Ottawa made a second side deal, this time with the New Jersey Devils, who wanted to protect Viacheslav Fetisov from selection. With their third pick, Ottawa took Brad Shaw in exchange for a young prospect.

Once the draft reached the forwards portion, Ottawa fell apart. At pick 33, Bridgman attempted to select Todd Ewen from the Montreal Canadiens. However, the Canadiens had already lost two players in the draft, including one to the Senators, and none of their players were available to be selected. Bridgman apologized and then returned to the podium a few minutes later to select Mark Freer from the Philadelphia Flyers. At pick 40, the Senators tried to take Todd Hawkins from Toronto, but the Maple Leafs had already lost the maximum number of players too. Bridgman retreated to Ottawa's table and then after a discussion, returned to select C. J. Young from Calgary, but he was not eligible to be selected as he was not on the final copy of the list provided by the league. Ziegler, unimpressed by Ottawa's failures, sent the team a note telling them to get their act together. Bridgman returned to the podium for the third time to select Darcy Loewen from the Buffalo Sabres.

Analysis of the team's selections showed that the Lightning and Senators had chosen different ways to construct their franchises. Tampa went with NHL veterans, attempting to ice a team that could still compete, while Ottawa, with a number of youthful selections, chose to build for the future.

== Draft results ==
The following players were selected by the Ottawa Senators and Tampa Bay Lightning;

| # | Player | Drafted from | Drafted by |
|---|---|---|---|
| 1. | Peter Sidorkiewicz (G) | Hartford Whalers | Ottawa Senators |
| 2. | Wendell Young (G) | Pittsburgh Penguins | Tampa Bay Lightning |
| 3. | Mark Laforest (G) | New York Rangers | Ottawa Senators |
| 4. | Frederic Chabot (G) | Montreal Canadiens | Tampa Bay Lightning |
| 5. | Brad Shaw (D) | New Jersey Devils | Ottawa Senators |
| 6. | Joe Reekie (D) | New York Islanders | Tampa Bay Lightning |
| 7. | Shawn Chambers (D) | Washington Capitals | Tampa Bay Lightning |
| 8. | Darren Rumble (D) | Philadelphia Flyers | Ottawa Senators |
| 9. | Peter Taglianetti (D) | Pittsburgh Penguins | Tampa Bay Lightning |
| 10. | Dominic Lavoie (D) | St. Louis Blues | Ottawa Senators |
| 11. | Brad Miller (D) | Buffalo Sabres | Ottawa Senators |
| 12. | Bob McGill (D) | Detroit Red Wings | Tampa Bay Lightning |
| 13. | Ken Hammond (D) | Vancouver Canucks | Ottawa Senators |
| 14. | Jeff Bloemberg (D) | New York Rangers | Tampa Bay Lightning |
| 15. | Doug Crossman (D) | Quebec Nordiques | Tampa Bay Lightning |
| 16. | Kent Paynter (D) | Winnipeg Jets | Ottawa Senators |
| 17. | Rob Ramage (D) | Minnesota North Stars | Tampa Bay Lightning |
| 18. | John Van Kessel (D) | Los Angeles Kings | Ottawa Senators |
| 19. | Michel Mongeau (C) | St. Louis Blues | Tampa Bay Lightning |
| 20. | Sylvain Turgeon (LW) | Montreal Canadiens | Ottawa Senators |
| 21. | Mike Peluso (F) | Chicago Blackhawks | Ottawa Senators |
| 22. | Anatoli Semenov (C) | Edmonton Oilers | Tampa Bay Lightning |
| 23. | Rob Murphy (C) | Vancouver Canucks | Ottawa Senators |
| 24. | Mike Hartman (LW) | Winnipeg Jets | Tampa Bay Lightning |
| 25. | Mark Lamb (C) | Edmonton Oilers | Ottawa Senators |
| 26. | Basil McRae (LW) | Minnesota North Stars | Tampa Bay Lightning |
| 27. | Laurie Boschman (F) | New Jersey Devils | Ottawa Senators |
| 28. | Rob DiMaio (RW) | New York Islanders | Tampa Bay Lightning |
| 29. | Jim Thomson (RW) | Los Angeles Kings | Ottawa Senators |
| 30. | Steve Maltais (W) | Quebec Nordiques | Tampa Bay Lightning |
| 31. | Lonnie Loach (LW) | Detroit Red Wings | Ottawa Senators |
| 32. | Dan Vincelette (LW) | Chicago Blackhawks | Tampa Bay Lightning |
| 33. | Mark Freer (C) | Philadelphia Flyers | Ottawa Senators |
| 34. | Tim Bergland (RW) | Washington Capitals | Tampa Bay Lightning |
| 35. | Chris Lindberg (LW) | Calgary Flames | Ottawa Senators |
| 36. | Brian Bradley (C) | Toronto Maple Leafs | Tampa Bay Lightning |
| 37. | Jeff Lazaro (RW) | Boston Bruins | Ottawa Senators |
| 38. | Keith Osborne (RW) | Toronto Maple Leafs | Tampa Bay Lightning |
| 39. | Darcy Loewen (LW) | Buffalo Sabres | Ottawa Senators |
| 40. | Shayne Stevenson (C) | Boston Bruins | Tampa Bay Lightning |
| 41. | Blair Atcheynum (RW) | Hartford Whalers | Ottawa Senators |
| 42. | Tim Hunter (F) | Calgary Flames | Tampa Bay Lightning |

== Post-draft ==
Esposito remained true to his word, trading three players selected in the draft before the start of the 1992–93 season;

- Frederic Chabot (traded to Montreal for goaltender Jean-Claude Bergeron on June 18, 1992)
- Tim Hunter (traded to Quebec for future considerations on June 19, 1992) (Note: Future considerations became forward Martin Simard, completed on September 14.)
- Jeff Bloemberg (traded to Edmonton for future considerations on September 25, 1992)

Furthermore, on draft day, the Lightning acquired forward Danton Cole from the Winnipeg Jets for future considerations. They also sent a third-round pick in the 1994 NHL entry draft, a fourth-round pick in 1995 and a sixth-round pick in 1996 to the St. Louis Blues for goaltender Pat Jablonski, forwards Darin Kimble and Steve Tuttle, and defenseman Rob Robinson. (Note: Tampa would trade Kimble prior to the start of the season on September 4 to the Boston Bruins for forward Ken Hodge Jr. and defenseman Matt Hervey.)

The Senators were equally as active with their selections. After being selected by the Senators, Laforest was traded back to the New York Rangers in exchange for Jody Hull. However, the Rangers were unwilling to accept Laforest's return and insisted the Senators keep him. However, the Senators mailed a new contract to an address that Laforest no longer used and the goaltender did not receive his contract before the mandatory date, making it ineligible. Ottawa then claimed the goaltender was a free agent and Laforest was forced to look for a new team. Calgary Flames general manager Doug Risebrough had attempted to prevent Lindberg's selection by reportedly striking a deal with the Lightning and the Senators ahead of the draft, but angrily departed the draft room after the Senators selected him. Five days after the draft on June 23, Lindberg was traded back to the Flames for defenseman Mark Osiecki. Neil Brady was acquired on September 3 for to complete the deal the Senators had with the Devils.

== See also ==
- 1992 NHL entry draft
- 1992 NHL supplemental draft
