= Steve Weeks =

Canadian ice hockey player (born 1958)

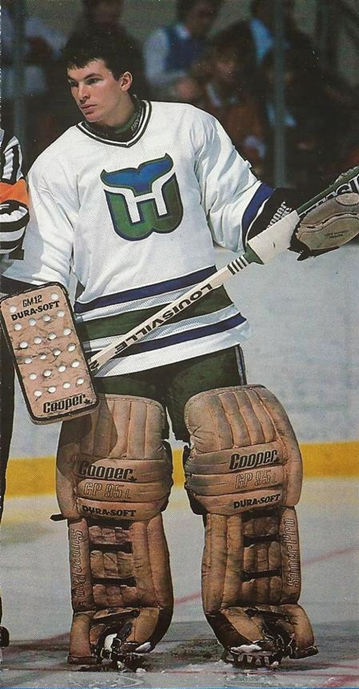
- Born: June 30, 1958 (age 68) Scarborough, Ontario, Canada
- Height: 5 ft 11 in (180 cm)
- Weight: 165 lb (75 kg; 11 st 11 lb)
- Position: Goaltender
- Caught: Left
- Played for: New York Rangers; Hartford Whalers; Vancouver Canucks; New York Islanders; Los Angeles Kings; Ottawa Senators
- National team: Canada
- NHL draft: 176th overall, 1978; New York Rangers
- Playing career: 1981–1993

Stephen K. Weeks (born June 30, 1958) is a Canadian former professional ice hockey goaltender. Weeks played 13 seasons in the National Hockey League (NHL) with the New York Rangers, Hartford Whalers, Vancouver Canucks, New York Islanders, Los Angeles Kings, and Ottawa Senators. Weeks was drafted by the Rangers in the 1978 NHL Amateur Draft and made his NHL debut with the Rangers in 1981. Internationally, he played for the Canadian national team at the 1985 World Championships, winning a silver medal.

== Playing career ==
Weeks was born in Scarborough, Ontario. As a youth, he played in the 1971 Quebec International Pee-Wee Hockey Tournament with a minor ice hockey team from Toronto. Weeks played collegiate hockey for Northern Michigan University. While playing for the Northern Michigan Wildcats, Weeks earned the 1978 team's most improved player award and was named the team's most valuable player in 1980. In 1980, Weeks won the CCHA Player of the Year Award and was a member of the CCHA All Academic Team.

=== New York Rangers ===
Weeks was selected by the New York Rangers of the National Hockey League (NHL) in the 11th round, 176th overall, in the 1978 NHL entry draft. Weeks turned pro in 1980, and spent the majority of the 1980–81 season with the New Haven Nighthawks of the American Hockey League (AHL), where he posted a 14 wins, 17 losses and 3 ties (14–17–3) record with a 4.13 goals against average (GAA) and a shutout in 36 games with the team. Weeks was recalled by New York three weeks before made his NHL debut on April 2, 1981. He held the powerful New York Islanders to only two goals in a 2–1 loss. Weeks also appeared in a playoff game with the Rangers, allowing no goals in 14 minutes of ice time against the Los Angeles Kings.

In 1981–82, under new head coach Herb Brooks, Weeks started the season splitting time in the Rangers net with John Davidson and Eddie Mio. Weeks recorded his first NHL shutout on January 13, 1982, in a 2–0 win over the Minnesota North Stars. He ended up leading New York with a 23–16–9 record with a 3.77 GAA and a shutout in 49 games, and helping the club make the 1982 Stanley Cup playoffs. Weeks saw no action in the first round against the Philadelphia Flyers, but Mio was injured in the first game versus the Islanders and Weeks came in as his substitute and finished the game, earning his first playoff win. However, the Rangers lost to the New York Islanders in the Patrick Division finals in six games. Weeks' playing time decreased in 1982–83 as the Rangers went out and traded for Glen Hanlon who became Mio's primary backup. Weeks appeared in just 18 games for the Rangers, going 9–5–3 with a 3.91 GAA. Weeks also saw some action with the Tulsa Oilers of the Central Hockey League (CHL), earning a record of 8–10–0 in 19 games with a 3.23 GAA.

Weeks once again saw some time with Tulsa in 1983–84, appearing in three games, going 3–0–0 with a 2.33 GAA in three games. Hanlon and Weeks spent the majority of the 1983–84 NHL season as the Rangers' goaltending tandem, with Hanlon playing the majority of the games. Weeks finished the season with the Rangers with a 10–11–2 record with a 3.97 GAA and a save percentage of .865. On September 5, 1984, the Rangers traded Weeks to the Hartford Whalers for future considerations.

=== Hartford Whalers ===
Weeks was one of three goaltenders acquired by general manager Emile Francis as part of his rebuilding plan for the Whalers. He became the Whalers' backup goaltender for the 1984–85 season, first to Greg Millen, then to Mike Liut, after Millen and Liut were traded for each other in March 1985. The arrival of the Liut/Weeks tandem marked the backbone of the "Whalermania" era in Hartford. In 23 games, Weeks led the Whalers with two shutouts, and overall posted a 9–12–2 record with a 3.91 GAA and a .870 save percentage. Weeks also saw some time with the Binghamton Whalers of the AHL, earning a 5–0–0 record with a 2.57 GAA in five games with the team.

Weeks backed up Liut in 1985–86, going 13–13–0 with a 3.85 GAA and a .863 save percentage in 27 games with the Whalers. The Whalers made the 1986 Stanley Cup playoffs on the final day of the season and faced the Adams Division-leading Quebec Nordiques in the first round. They beat the Nordiques after winning three games in a row and moved on to the second round to face the Montreal Canadiens. The series went to seven games, in which the Whalers lost to the eventual Stanley Cup champions. Weeks appeared in four playoff games with the team, going 1–2 with a 2.84 GAA in three games.

In 1986–87, Weeks appeared in 25 games, going 12–8–2 with a 3.42 GAA and .873 save percentage. The Whalers topped the Adams Division and faced the Quebec Nordiques again in the first round of the 1987 Stanley Cup playoffs. The Whalers lost the series four games to two, despite winning the first two games of the series. Weeks appeared in one playoff game, going 0–0 with a 1.67 GAA in 36 minutes of playing time. Weeks began the 1987–88 season with the Whalers, going 6–7–2 in 18 games, with a 3.59 GAA and .858 save percentage. However, as the Whalers struggled, Francis sought to shake up the team with a series of trades. Among them, on March 8, 1988, the Whalers traded Weeks to the Vancouver Canucks for goaltender Richard Brodeur.

=== Vancouver Canucks ===
After the trio of Brodeur, Kirk McLean and Frank Caprice began to allow too many goals, Canucks general manager Pat Quinn sought a solution to the team's goaltending woes. Quinn acquired Weeks by trading Brodeur, who had become unhappy in Vancouver. Weeks saw increased playing time when he joined the Canucks, appearing in nine games for Vancouver, posting a 4–3–2 record and a 3.38 GAA in nine games. In 1988–89, Weeks appeared in 35 games, his highest total since 1981–82 with the Rangers. Weeks earned a record of 11–19–5 with a 2.98 GAA and .893 save percentage with the Canucks as the primary backup to McLean. The Canucks qualified for the 1989 Stanley Cup playoffs, and in three postseason games against the Calgary Flames, Weeks earned a 1–1 record with a 3.43 GAA and .899 save percentage as the Canucks lost in seven games.

In 1989–90, Weeks backed up McLean, playing poorly in only 21 games, and struggled to a 4–11–4 record with a 4.15 GAA, as Vancouver missed the playoffs. In 1990–91, Weeks appeared in only one game with Vancouver, going 0–1–0 with a 6.10 GAA, being replaced as backup by Troy Gamble. He spent the rest of the season with Vancouver's senior affiliate, the Milwaukee Admirals of the International Hockey League, as he recorded a 16–19–0 record in 37 games with a 3.78 GAA. In three playoff games with Milwaukee, Weeks had a 1–2 record and a 3.71 GAA. On March 5, 1991, the Canucks traded Weeks to the Buffalo Sabres for cash considerations. After the trade, he remained with the Milwaukee Admirals, and became a free agent after the season.

=== Final seasons ===
Weeks was brought to the New York Islanders training camp in September 1991 after goaltender Mark Fitzpatrick suffered a relapse is his fight with a blood disorder. He signed with the Islanders on September 16, 1991, and became the Islanders back-up goaltender for the 1991–92 season. In 23 games with the Islanders, Weeks put together a solid 9–4–2 record with a 3.60 GAA and a .890 save percentage. On February 18, 1992, the Islanders traded Weeks to the Los Angeles Kings for the Kings' seventh round draft pick in the 1992 NHL entry draft. Weeks finished the 1991–92 season with the Kings as a backup to Kelly Hrudey, playing in seven games, going 1–3–0 with a 4.05 GAA and a .875 save percentage.

After the season, Weeks became a free agent, and on June 16, 1992, he signed with the Washington Capitals. The Capitals had attempted to circumvent the rules of the upcoming 1992 NHL expansion draft by signing goaltender Bernie Wolfe who had not played since 1979 with the intent of exposing him in the draft in order to protect prospect Olaf Kölzig. The NHL told the Capitals that this was unacceptable and instead, the Capitals signed Weeks. He was not selected, though less than two months later, on August 13, 1992, the Capitals traded Weeks to the expansion Ottawa Senators for future considerations.

In seven games with Ottawa in 1992–93, Weeks had a 0–5–0 record with a 7.23 GAA and a .792 save percentage. His struggles continued when he played in the minors, as in six games with the New Haven Senators of the AHL, Weeks went 0–6–0 with a 5.94 GAA. Weeks announced his retirement from the NHL in 1993.

== International career ==
Medal record

Representing Canada

Ice hockey

World Championships
Silver medal – second place	1985 Czechoslovakia	

Weeks represented Canada at the 1985 World Ice Hockey Championships held in Prague, Czechoslovakia. In five games, Weeks had a 3–1–1 record with a 2.04 GAA, helping Canada win the silver medal.

== Coaching career ==
=== Hartford Whalers/Carolina Hurricanes ===
Weeks became the Whalers goaltending consultant following his retirement in 1993. Weeks remained in the organization until 2001, mostly as a goaltending coach and scout. However, he was an assistant coach for the Whalers in their final season in 1996–97.

=== Atlanta Thrashers ===
Weeks was an assistant coach with the Atlanta Thrashers from 2001 to 2010. He was originally hired by the Thrashers on June 26, 2001, as an assistant to head coach Curt Fraser. After Fraser was let go on December 29, 2002, Weeks stayed on as an assistant to interim coach Don Waddell. He remained with the club as an assistant with head coaches Bob Hartley, who was hired in January 2003 and let go in October 2007, Waddell again as an interim coach for the rest of the 2007–08 season and John Anderson beginning in 2008. Weeks was let go when Anderson was fired on April 14, 2010.

=== Chicago Blackhawks ===
Weeks became the Chicago Blackhawks goaltending coach on August 12, 2013, replacing Stéphane Waite who departed for the Montreal Canadiens. His was fired by the Blackhawks on June 27, 2014. He was replaced by Jimmy Waite, a former goaltender of the Blackhawks who returned to the club.

== Personal life ==
Weeks was inducted in the Northern Michigan University's hall of fame in 1990.

== Career statistics ==
=== Regular season and playoffs ===
			Regular season									Playoffs
Season	Team	League	GP	W	L	T	MIN	GA	SO	GAA	SV%	GP	W	L	MIN	GA	SO	GAA	SV%
1975–76	Toronto Marlboros	OMJHL	18	—	—	—	—	—	—	—	—	—	—	—	—	—	—	—	—
1976–77	Northern Michigan University	NCAA	16	7	7	0	811	58	0	4.29	.858	1	0	1	60	6	0	6.00	—
1977–78	Northern Michigan University	NCAA	19	10	5	2	1015	56	1	3.31	.901	—	—	—	—	—	—	—	—
1978–79	Northern Michigan University	NCAA	25	13	8	2	1437	82	0	3.42	.902	2	0	1	151	10	0	3.97	—
1979–80	Northern Michigan University	NCAA	36	29	6	1	2133	105	1	2.95	.910	6	4	1	330	18	0	3.97	—
1980–81	New York Rangers	NHL	1	0	1	0	59	2	0	2.04	.909	1	0	0	14	1	0	4.29	.900
1980–81	New Haven Nighthawks	AHL	36	14	17	3	2065	142	1	4.13	.866	—	—	—	—	—	—	—	—
1981–82	New York Rangers	NHL	49	23	16	9	2849	179	1	3.77	.868	4	1	2	127	9	0	4.27	.857
1982–83	New York Rangers	NHL	18	9	5	3	1040	68	0	3.92	.862	—	—	—	—	—	—	—	—
1982–83	Tulsa Oilers	CHL	19	8	10	0	1116	60	0	3.23	—	—	—	—	—	—	—	—	—
1983–84	New York Rangers	NHL	26	10	11	2	1358	90	0	3.98	.865	—	—	—	—	—	—	—	—
1983–84	Tulsa Oilers	CHL	3	3	0	0	180	7	0	2.33	—	—	—	—	—	—	—	—	—
1984–85	Hartford Whalers	NHL	24	10	12	2	1454	92	2	3.80	.873	—	—	—	—	—	—	—	—
1984–85	Binghamton Whalers	AHL	5	5	0	0	303	13	0	2.57	—	—	—	—	—	—	—	—	—
1985–86	Hartford Whalers	NHL	27	13	13	0	1542	99	1	3.85	.863	3	1	2	168	8	0	2.86	.875
1986–87	Hartford Whalers	NHL	25	12	8	2	1367	78	1	3.42	.873	1	0	0	36	1	0	1.65	.955
1987–88	Hartford Whalers	NHL	18	6	7	2	918	55	0	3.59	.858	—	—	—	—	—	—	—	—
1987–88	Vancouver Canucks	NHL	9	4	3	2	550	31	0	3.38	.891	—	—	—	—	—	—	—	—
1988–89	Vancouver Canucks	NHL	35	11	19	5	2056	102	0	2.98	.892	3	1	1	140	8	0	3.43	.899
1989–90	Vancouver Canucks	NHL	21	4	11	4	1142	79	0	4.15	.872	—	—	—	—	—	—	—	—
1990–91	Vancouver Canucks	NHL	1	0	1	0	59	6	0	6.11	.793	—	—	—	—	—	—	—	—
1990–91	Milwaukee Admirals	IHL	37	16	19	0	2014	127	0	3.78	—	3	1	2	210	13	0	3.71	—
1991–92	New York Islanders	NHL	23	9	4	2	1032	62	0	3.61	.890	—	—	—	—	—	—	—	—
1991–92	Los Angeles Kings	NHL	7	1	3	0	252	17	0	4.04	.875	—	—	—	—	—	—	—	—
1992–93	Ottawa Senators	NHL	7	0	5	0	249	30	0	7.22	.792	—	—	—	—	—	—	—	—
1992–93	New Haven Senators	AHL	6	0	6	0	323	32	0	5.94	.845	—	—	—	—	—	—	—	—
NHL totals			291	112	119	33	15927	990	5	3.73	.872	12	3	5	484	27	0	3.34	.887

=== International ===
Year	Team	Event	GP	W	L	T	MIN	GA	SO	GAA	SV%
1985	Canada	WC	5	3	1	1	265	9	1	2.04	—
Senior totals			5	3	1	1	265	9	1	2.04	—

== Awards and honours ==
Award	Year
All-CCHA Second Team	1978–79
All-CCHA First Team	1979–80
All-NCAA All-Tournament Team	1980

== Citations ==
Awards and achievements
Preceded by Ken Morrow	CCHA Player of the Year; 1979–80	Succeeded by Jeff Pyle
