= Bernie Wolfe (ice hockey) =

Canadian ice hockey player, businessman (b. 1951)

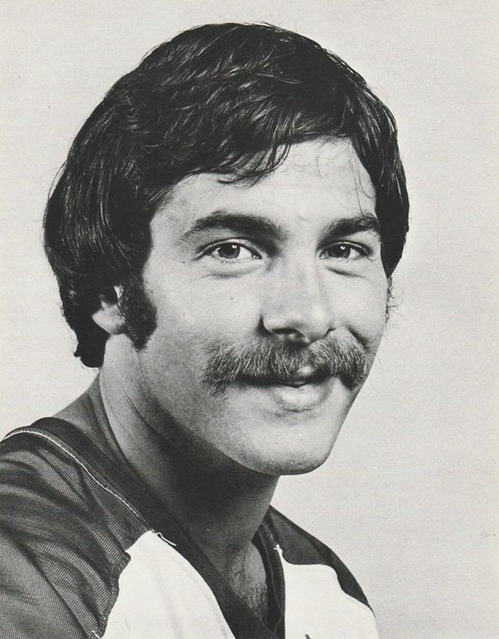
- Born: December 18, 1951 (age 74) Montreal, Quebec, Canada
- Height: 5 ft 9 in (175 cm)
- Weight: 165 lb (75 kg; 11 st 11 lb)
- Position: Goaltender
- Caught: Left
- Played for: Washington Capitals
- NHL draft: Undrafted
- Playing career: 1974–1979

Bernard Ronald Wolfe (born December 18, 1951) is a Canadian businessman and former professional ice hockey player. Wolfe played 119 games over four seasons in the National Hockey League with the Washington Capitals from 1975 to 1979.

== Early life ==
Wolfe was born in Montreal, Quebec, Canada, and is Jewish. His mother, Fay Wolfe, observed upon his becoming an NHL hockey player: "Of course I would have preferred him to be a doctor, or some kind of professional man. But if Bernie is happy, then we're happy." His father, Mickey, had played goaltender for the Canadian Army team.

Wolfe attended, majored in financial management, and played hockey at Sir George Williams University in Montreal, where he was named the school's top male athlete. Playing for Sir George Williams, he was a Quebec University Athletic Association First Team All-Star goaltender in 1972 and 1974, and a CIAU First Team All-Star in 1974. He backstopped Sir George Williams to the 1974 Canadian CIAU University Cup championship game, losing to the Waterloo Warriors; Wolfe won the Major W.J. "Danny" McLeod Award, as Most Valuable Player of the national championship tournament.

Later, while he was playing in the NHL, he took courses at George Washington University.

== Biography ==
Signed as a free agent in 1975 by the Washington Capitals, Wolfe played for four seasons before retiring in November 1979 at age 27. Playing in 40 games for the Capitals during the 1975–76 season, the second season in the franchise's existence, he set club records for seasonal goals against average (GAA) at 4.16, and consecutive scoreless minutes at 80:43; while these figures are not impressive, they were a major improvement from results during the Capitals' first season, when they recorded the worst single season record in the history of the NHL, including an all-time worst 446 goals against, with a fourth-all-time worst 5.58 team GAA. He showed flashes of brilliance and was a solid performer on a team that struggled in those early years. He retired with one year remaining on his guaranteed contract, saying he "just didn't enjoy it anymore". In 119 games, his record was 20-61-21, with 424 goals against, a 4.17 goals against average, and one shutout.

Wolfe retired from professional hockey in 1979 and began a financial planning practice. He earned his Certified Financial Planner designation in 1981. Bernard R. Wolfe & Associates Inc., which in 2014 managed $14 billion in assets.

In 1992, the Capitals attempted to re-sign the 40-year-old Wolfe in order to make him the goaltender they would expose in the 1992 NHL Expansion Draft. League rules required every team to make a goalie available for the draft who had at least one game of NHL experience. The Capitals were unwilling to expose any of their three goalies – Don Beaupre, Jim Hrivnak, and Olaf Kölzig – that were currently under contract. Wolfe agreed to sign for the league minimum salary of $100,000 as a favor to general manager David Poile and owner Abe Pollin; well into his career as a financial planner, he promised to donate his salary to charity if his contract were approved. League president John Ziegler Jr. announced he was holding up approval, and summoned Poile to NHL headquarters in Toronto two days before the draft to explain himself. Poile took this as a sign the contract would be rejected, and signed Steve Weeks instead. Phil Esposito, who had recently become part owner of the expansion Tampa Bay Lightning, was quoted as saying about the incident: "I didn't just pay $50 million for Bernie Wolfe. He wasn't any good when I played against him".

Wolfe co-wrote a book, How to Watch Ice Hockey (1982), with journalist Mitch Henkin.

Wolfe was the president of the Washington Capitals Alumni Association from 1992 to 2007. In 1999, he had both of his hips replaced.

== Career statistics ==
=== Regular season and playoffs ===
| | | | Regular season | | | | | | | | | Playoffs |
| Season | Team | League | GP | W | L | T | MIN | GA | SO | GAA | SV% | GP | W | L | MIN | GA | SO | GAA | SV% |
|---|---|---|---|---|---|---|---|---|---|---|---|---|---|---|---|---|---|---|---|
| 1973–74 | Sir George Williams University | CIAU | 18 | 10 | 4 | 4 | 1080 | 74 | 0 | 4.11 | — | — | — | — | — | — | — | — | — |
| 1974–75 | Maine Nordiques | NAHL | 37 | 19 | 17 | 1 | 2156 | 150 | 1 | 4.17 | — | — | — | — | — | — | — | — | — |
| 1974–75 | Richmond Robins | AHL | 17 | 6 | 7 | 2 | 918 | 142 | 2 | 2.74 | — | 7 | 3 | 4 | 427 | 26 | 0 | 3.65 | — |
| 1975–76 | Washington Capitals | NHL | 40 | 5 | 23 | 7 | 2130 | 148 | 0 | 4.17 | .886 | — | — | — | — | — | — | — | — |
| 1975–76 | Richmond Robins | AHL | 3 | 2 | 0 | 0 | 147 | 6 | 0 | 2.44 | — | — | — | — | — | — | — | — | — |
| 1976–77 | Washington Capitals | NHL | 37 | 7 | 15 | 9 | 1777 | 114 | 1 | 3.85 | .879 | — | — | — | — | — | — | — | — |
| 1977–78 | Washington Capitals | NHL | 25 | 4 | 14 | 4 | 1325 | 94 | 0 | 4.26 | .871 | — | — | — | — | — | — | — | — |
| 1977–78 | Hershey Bears | AHL | 3 | 3 | 0 | 0 | 180 | 4 | 1 | 1.33 | — | — | — | — | — | — | — | — | — |
| 1978–79 | Washington Capitals | NHL | 17 | 4 | 9 | 1 | 860 | 68 | 0 | 4.75 | .855 | — | — | — | — | — | — | — | — |
| NHL totals | | | 119 | 20 | 61 | 21 | 6091 | 424 | 1 | 4.18 | .877 | — | — | — | — | — | — | — | — |

== See also ==
- List of select Jewish ice hockey players
