= Joe Reekie =

Canadian former ice hockey player (born 1965)

- Born: February 22, 1965 (age 60); Victoria, British Columbia, Canada
- Height: 6 ft 3 in (191 cm)
- Weight: 195 lb (88 kg; 13 st 13 lb)
- Position: Defence
- Shot: Left
- Played for: Buffalo Sabres; New York Islanders; Tampa Bay Lightning; Washington Capitals; Chicago Blackhawks
- NHL draft: 124th overall, 1983; Hartford Whalers; 119th overall, 1985; Buffalo Sabres
- Playing career: 1985–2002

Joseph James Reekie (born February 22, 1965) is a Canadian former ice hockey player. Reekie was born in Victoria, British Columbia.

== Career ==
Reekie was originally drafted in 1983 by the Hartford Whalers; however, he never signed with the team and re-entered the NHL draft two years later where he was drafted this time by the Buffalo Sabres. Reekie played for the Sabres, New York Islanders, Tampa Bay Lightning, Washington Capitals, and Chicago Blackhawks.

After retiring from active professional play, Reekie became a post-game analyst for the Capitals on NBC Sports Regional Networks.

== Personal life ==
Reekie has three children.

== Career statistics ==
=== Regular season and playoffs ===
			Regular season					Playoffs
Season	Team	League	GP	G	A	Pts	PIM	GP	G	A	Pts	PIM
1982–83	North Bay Centennials	OHL	59	2	9	11	49	8	0	1	1	11
1983–84	North Bay Centennials	OHL	9	1	0	1	18	—	—	—	—	—
1983–84	Cornwall Royals	OHL	53	6	27	33	166	3	0	0	0	4
1984–85	Cornwall Royals	OHL	65	19	63	82	134	9	4	13	17	18
1985–86	Rochester Americans	AHL	77	3	25	28	178	—	—	—	—	—
1985–86	Buffalo Sabres	NHL	3	0	0	0	14	—	—	—	—	—
1986–87	Rochester Americans	AHL	22	0	6	6	52	—	—	—	—	—
1986–87	Buffalo Sabres	NHL	56	1	8	9	82	—	—	—	—	—
1987–88	Buffalo Sabres	NHL	30	1	4	5	68	2	0	0	0	4
1988–89	Rochester Americans	AHL	21	1	2	3	56	—	—	—	—	—
1988–89	Buffalo Sabres	NHL	15	1	3	4	26	—	—	—	—	—
1989–90	Springfield Indians	AHL	15	1	4	5	24	—	—	—	—	—
1989–90	New York Islanders	NHL	31	1	8	9	43	—	—	—	—	—
1990–91	Capital District Islanders	AHL	2	1	0	1	0	—	—	—	—	—
1990–91	New York Islanders	NHL	66	3	16	19	96	—	—	—	—	—
1991–92	Capital District Islanders	AHL	3	2	2	4	2	—	—	—	—	—
1991–92	New York Islanders	NHL	54	4	12	16	85	—	—	—	—	—
1992–93	Tampa Bay Lightning	NHL	42	2	11	13	69	—	—	—	—	—
1993–94	Tampa Bay Lightning	NHL	73	1	11	12	127	—	—	—	—	—
1993–94	Washington Capitals	NHL	12	0	5	5	29	11	2	1	3	29
1994–95	Washington Capitals	NHL	48	1	6	7	97	—	—	—	—	—
1995–96	Washington Capitals	NHL	78	3	7	10	149	—	—	—	—	—
1996–97	Washington Capitals	NHL	65	1	8	9	107	—	—	—	—	—
1997–98	Washington Capitals	NHL	68	2	8	10	70	21	1	2	3	20
1998–99	Washington Capitals	NHL	73	0	10	10	68	—	—	—	—	—
1999–00	Washington Capitals	NHL	59	0	7	7	50	5	0	1	1	2
2000–01	Washington Capitals	NHL	74	2	9	11	77	4	0	0	0	4
2001–02	Washington Capitals	NHL	38	2	4	6	41	—	—	—	—	—
2001–02	Chicago Blackhawks	NHL	17	0	2	2	28	1	0	0	0	2
NHL totals			902	25	139	164	1326	51	3	4	7	63
