= Al Jensen =

Canadian ice hockey player (born 1958)

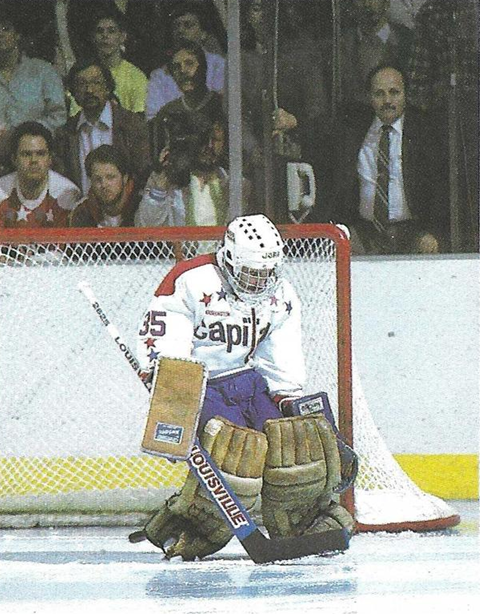
- Born: November 27, 1958 (age 67) Hamilton, Ontario, Canada
- Height: 5 ft 10 in (178 cm)
- Weight: 180 lb (82 kg; 12 st 12 lb)
- Position: Goaltender
- Caught: Left
- Played for: Detroit Red Wings; Washington Capitals; Los Angeles Kings
- NHL draft: 31st overall, 1978; Detroit Red Wings
- Playing career: 1980–1987

Allan Raymond Jensen (born November 27, 1958) is a Canadian former ice hockey goaltender.

Selected 31st overall by the Detroit Red Wings in the 1978 NHL entry draft, Jensen only played one game for the Red Wings before he was traded to the Washington Capitals in July 1981 in exchange for Mark Lofthouse. It was with the Capitals that he was given the chance to blossom into a starting goaltender, and helped guide the team to its first playoff appearance, in the 1982–83 NHL season. The next season Jensen achieved even more as he was a co-winner of the William M. Jennings Trophy with teammate Pat Riggin.

Jensen played almost six seasons with the Capitals before he was traded to the Los Angeles Kings in the middle of the 1986–87 NHL season in exchange for defenseman Garry Galley. He played one season with the New Haven Nighthawks of the AHL before retiring from active professional play. In 179 NHL games, Jensen posted a 95-53-18 regular season record.

== Career statistics ==
=== Regular season and playoffs ===
			Regular season									Playoffs
Season	Team	League	GP	W	L	T	MIN	GA	SO	GAA	SV%	GP	W	L	T	MIN	GA	SO	GAA	SV%
1975–76	Hamilton Fincups	OMJHL	28	—	—	—	1451	97	0	4.01	—	3	2	0	0	140	6	1	2.57	—
1976–77	St. Catharines Fincups	OMJHL	48	—	—	—	2727	168	2	3.70	—	13	7	5	1	707	36	1	3.06	—
1977–78	Hamilton Fincups	OMJHL	43	—	—	—	2582	146	3	3.39	—	17	8	5	4	967	43	1	2.67	—
1978–79	Kalamazoo Wings	IHL	47	—	—	—	2596	156	2	3.61	—	12	—	—	—	718	34	0	2.84	—
1979–80	Adirondack Red Wings	AHL	57	27	24	5	3406	199	2	3.51	.887	4	0	4	—	212	15	0	4.25	—
1980–81	Detroit Red Wings	NHL	1	0	1	0	60	7	0	7.00	.767	—	—	—	—	—	—	—	—	—
1980–81	Adirondack Red Wings	AHL	60	27	21	3	3169	203	3	3.84	.880	11	7	4	—	626	46	0	4.41	—
1981–82	Washington Capitals	NHL	26	8	8	4	1274	81	0	3.81	.884	—	—	—	—	—	—	—	—	—
1981–82	Hershey Bears	AHL	8	4	1	1	407	24	0	3.54	—	3	2	1	—	162	9	0	3.33	—
1982–83	Washington Capitals	NHL	40	22	12	6	2358	135	1	3.44	.882	3	1	2	—	139	10	0	4.32	.867
1982–83	Hershey Bears	AHL	6	—	—	—	316	14	1	2.66	.915	—	—	—	—	—	—	—	—	—
1983–84	Washington Capitals	NHL	43	25	13	3	2414	117	4	2.91	.882	6	3	1	—	258	14	0	3.26	.883
1983–84	Hershey Bears	AHL	3	1	2	0	180	16	0	5.33	.864	—	—	—	—	—	—	—	—	—
1984–85	Washington Capitals	NHL	14	10	3	1	803	34	1	2.54	.885	3	1	2	—	201	8	0	2.39	.907
1984–85	Binghamton Whalers	AHL	3	2	1	0	180	9	0	3.00	.907	—	—	—	—	—	—	—	—	—
1985–86	Washington Capitals	NHL	44	28	9	3	2437	129	2	3.18	.890	—	—	—	—	—	—	—	—	—
1986–87	Washington Capitals	NHL	6	1	3	1	328	27	0	4.94	.853	—	—	—	—	—	—	—	—	—
1986–87	Binghamton Whalers	AHL	13	5	6	0	684	42	0	3.68	.875	—	—	—	—	—	—	—	—	—
1986–87	Los Angeles Kings	NHL	5	1	4	0	300	27	0	5.40	.825	—	—	—	—	—	—	—	—	—
1987–88	New Haven Nighthawks	AHL	20	5	12	3	1129	84	0	4.46	.873	—	—	—	—	—	—	—	—	—
NHL totals			179	95	53	18	9974	557	8	3.35	.881	12	5	5	—	598	32	0	3.21	.886

=== International ===
Year	Team	Event	GP	W	L	T	MIN	GA	SO	GAA
1977	Canada	WJC	7	5	1	1	400	19	1	2.85
1978	Canada	WJC	3	—	—	—	180	12	—	4.00
Junior totals			10	—	—	—	580	31	—	3.21

"Jensen's stats". The Goaltender Home Page.

Preceded by Roland Melanson and Billy Smith	Winner of the Jennings Trophy; 1984 (with Pat Riggin)	Succeeded by Tom Barrasso, Bob Sauve
