= Braden Holtby =

Canadian ice hockey player (born 1989)

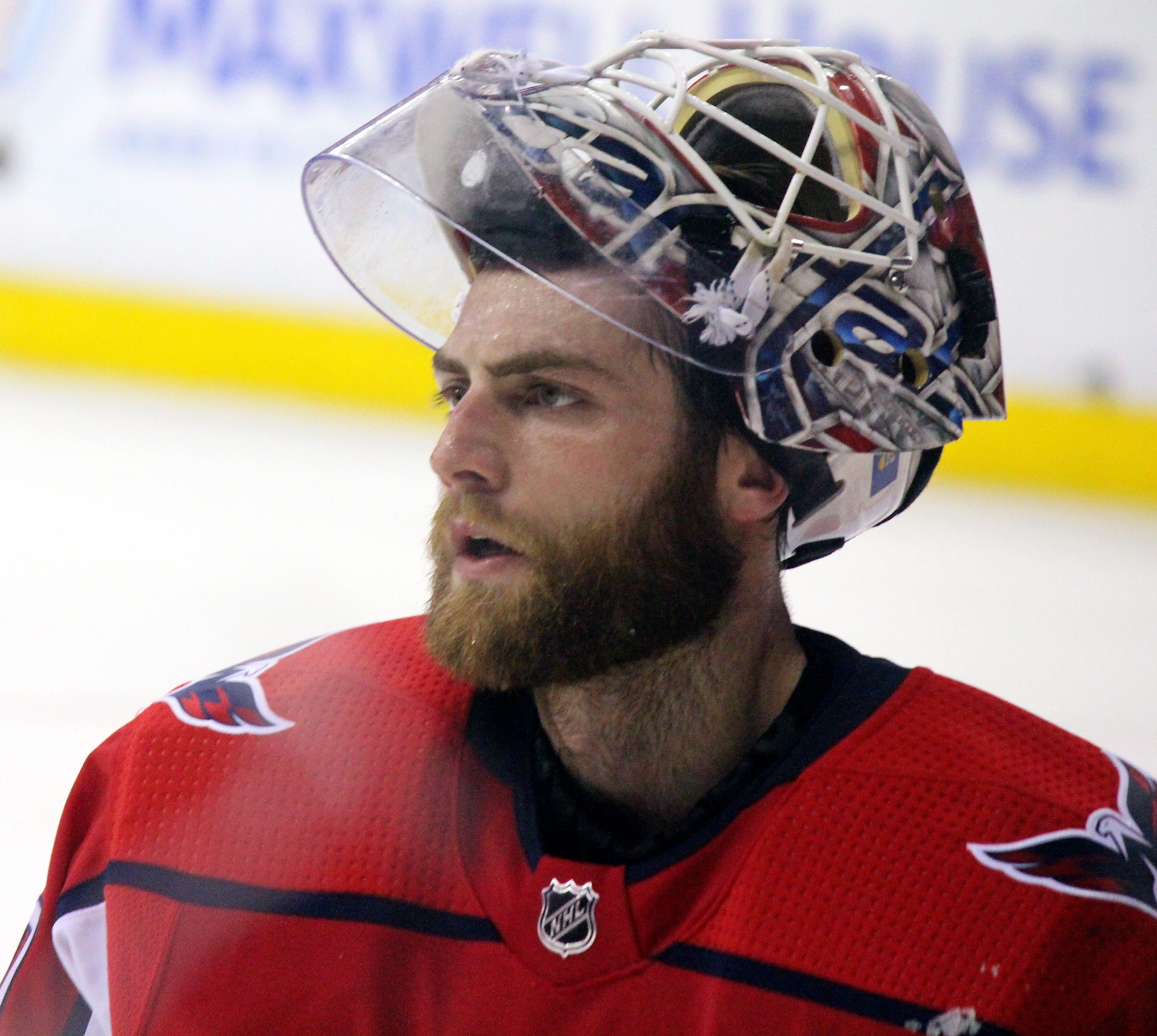
- Holtby with the Washington Capitals in April 2018
- Born: September 16, 1989 (age 37) Lloydminster, Saskatchewan, Canada
- Height: 6 ft 1 in (185 cm)
- Weight: 215 lb (98 kg; 15 st 5 lb)
- Position: Goaltender
- Caught: Left
- Played for: Washington Capitals; Vancouver Canucks; Dallas Stars
- National team: Canada
- NHL draft: 93rd overall, 2008; Washington Capitals
- Playing career: 2009–2022

Braden Holtby (born September 16, 1989) is a Canadian former professional ice hockey goaltender. He previously played for the Washington Capitals, Vancouver Canucks and Dallas Stars of the National Hockey League (NHL). He was selected in the fourth round, 93rd overall, of the 2008 NHL entry draft by the Capitals, with whom he spent the first ten seasons of his career.

After a couple years of development, Holtby became the Capitals' starting goaltender during the lockout-shortened 2012–13 season. Beginning during the 2014–15 season, Holtby won at least 40 games in three consecutive seasons. In 2016, Holtby tied the league record for most wins by a goaltender in a single season (shared with Martin Brodeur) with 48 and was awarded the Vezina Trophy as the league's best goaltender. The following year, he won the William M. Jennings Trophy for helping the Capitals allow the fewest goals in the league. In 2018, Holtby backstopped the Capitals to their first Stanley Cup championship in franchise history.

== Playing career ==
=== Junior ===
Holtby spent his junior career with the Saskatoon Blades of the Western Hockey League (WHL). The Blades struggled through his first two seasons with the team, and Holtby managed only 42 wins in 115 games. However, in his last WHL season, after being drafted by the Capitals in the fourth round of the 2008 NHL entry draft, Holtby nearly equaled his wins total from the previous two seasons, posting a much-improved 40 wins in 61 games.

=== Professional ===
==== Washington Capitals (2010–2020) ====
In 2009, Holtby made the jump to professional hockey and split the season between the ECHL's South Carolina Stingrays and the Hershey Bears of the American Hockey League (AHL). He posted an impressive 24 wins in 37 games for the Bears, with a 2.32 goals against average (GAA) and .917 save percentage. He won seven of 12 games with the Stingrays, and represented South Carolina in that season's ECHL All-Star Game.

Holtby made his NHL debut on November 5, 2010, against the Boston Bruins at the Verizon Center. After replacing Michal Neuvirth with ten minutes remaining and the game tied 3–3, Holtby stopped four Bruins shots as the Capitals scored two goals to give him the win. Holtby made his first NHL start two days later against the Philadelphia Flyers, a game the Capitals won 3–2 in overtime. Holtby recorded his first NHL shutout on March 9, 2011, stopping 22 shots in a 5–0 victory over the Edmonton Oilers. After posting a 4–0–0 record, a 1.05 GAA and a .965 save percentage, Holtby was named the NHL's First Star of the Week for the week ending March 13, 2011. On March 27, 2011, Holtby was assigned to Hershey, despite a 10–2–2 record in 14 starts.

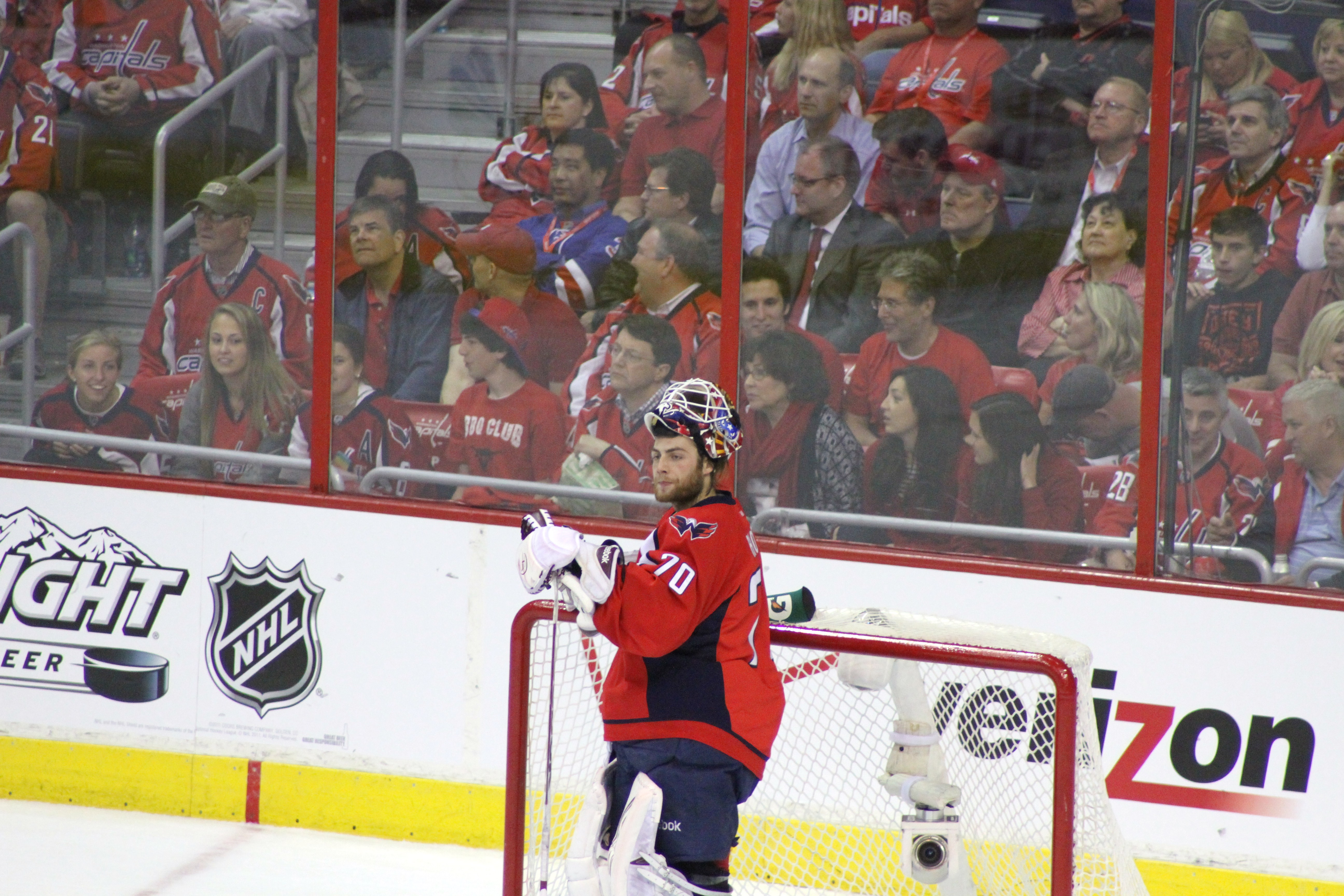
Holtby with the Capitals in May 2012

He returned in the last game of the 2011–12 season after injuries to starter Tomáš Vokoun and backup Michal Neuvirth. Holtby started game one of the 2012 playoffs against the defending Stanley Cup champion and second-seeded Boston Bruins, saving 29 of 30 shots in a 1–0 overtime loss. In game two, Holtby stopped 43 of 44 shots in a 2–1 double overtime win to tie the series at 1–1. Washington head coach Dale Hunter decided to start Holtby for the next game, even though Neuvirth and Vokoun would be available in the playoffs, stating, "Holtby's our goalie." Holtby went on to aid the Capitals in upsetting the Bruins, stopping all but one of the shots he faced in a game seven to beat the Bruins 2–1 in overtime. He continued his sensational play against the top-seeded New York Rangers, splitting two road games in New York and stopping all shots he faced until late in a triple overtime game that saw the Capitals fall 2–1. Holtby continued his impressive goaltending by beating the Rangers in game four to tie the series at 2–2. However, he was not as stellar in game five, allowing the game-tying goal with 6.6 seconds left in the game and then giving up the losing goal in overtime. After the game, Holtby stated, "I didn't see a thing." After the loss, Holtby rebounded by making 30 saves in game six, with the Capitals winning 2–1 and forcing the decisive game seven. On May 12, Holtby started in his second career game seven. One minute and 32 seconds into the game, Brad Richards of the Rangers blasted a slap shot past Holtby, making the score 1–0 early in. Holtby was able to shake it off, however, and play a solid game, finishing with 29 saves, though the Capitals were ultimately unable to beat the Rangers in the final period, losing game seven.

After his impressive playoff performances as a rookie, Holtby was rewarded with the starting goaltender's job for the 2012–13 season, as named by Washington's new head coach, Adam Oates. On February 25, 2013, just over a month after the lockout-shortened season commenced, Holtby agreed to a two-year, $3.7 million contract extension with the Capitals.

On April 8, 2015, Holtby shut-out the Boston Bruins, 3–0, and having already shut-out Boston in his previous two games in the 2014–15 season, he became the first goaltender to ever perform a season-sweep of three or more games against Boston without a single goal allowed. This victory would also give him 41 wins on the season, tying him with Olaf Kölzig for most in a single season in Capitals history. On May 4, 2015, Holtby shut-out the Presidents' Trophy-winning New York Rangers, 1–0, to capture a 2–1 playoff lead in the Eastern Conference semifinals. The Capitals lost the series to the New York Rangers 2–1 in overtime in a game seven, despite being up 3–1 earlier in the series.

Following the 2014–15 NHL season Holtby became a restricted free agent under the NHL Collective Bargaining Agreement. The Washington Capitals made him a qualifying offer to retain his NHL rights and, on July 5, 2015, Holtby filed for Salary Arbitration. On July 24, it was announced by the team that Holtby had signed a 5-year, $30.5 million contract. On April 9, 2016, the Capitals defeated the St. Louis Blues 5–1, earning Holtby his 48th win of the season (four of which came via shootouts) and tying him with Martin Brodeur for the most wins in a single season record. He achieved the mark with 66 game starts throughout the 2015–16 NHL season. After the season ended, Holtby won the Vezina Trophy, awarded to the league's best goaltender. Holtby was also a finalist for the Ted Lindsay Award as the most outstanding player judged by the NHLPA and the award ultimately went to Chicago Blackhawks winger Patrick Kane.

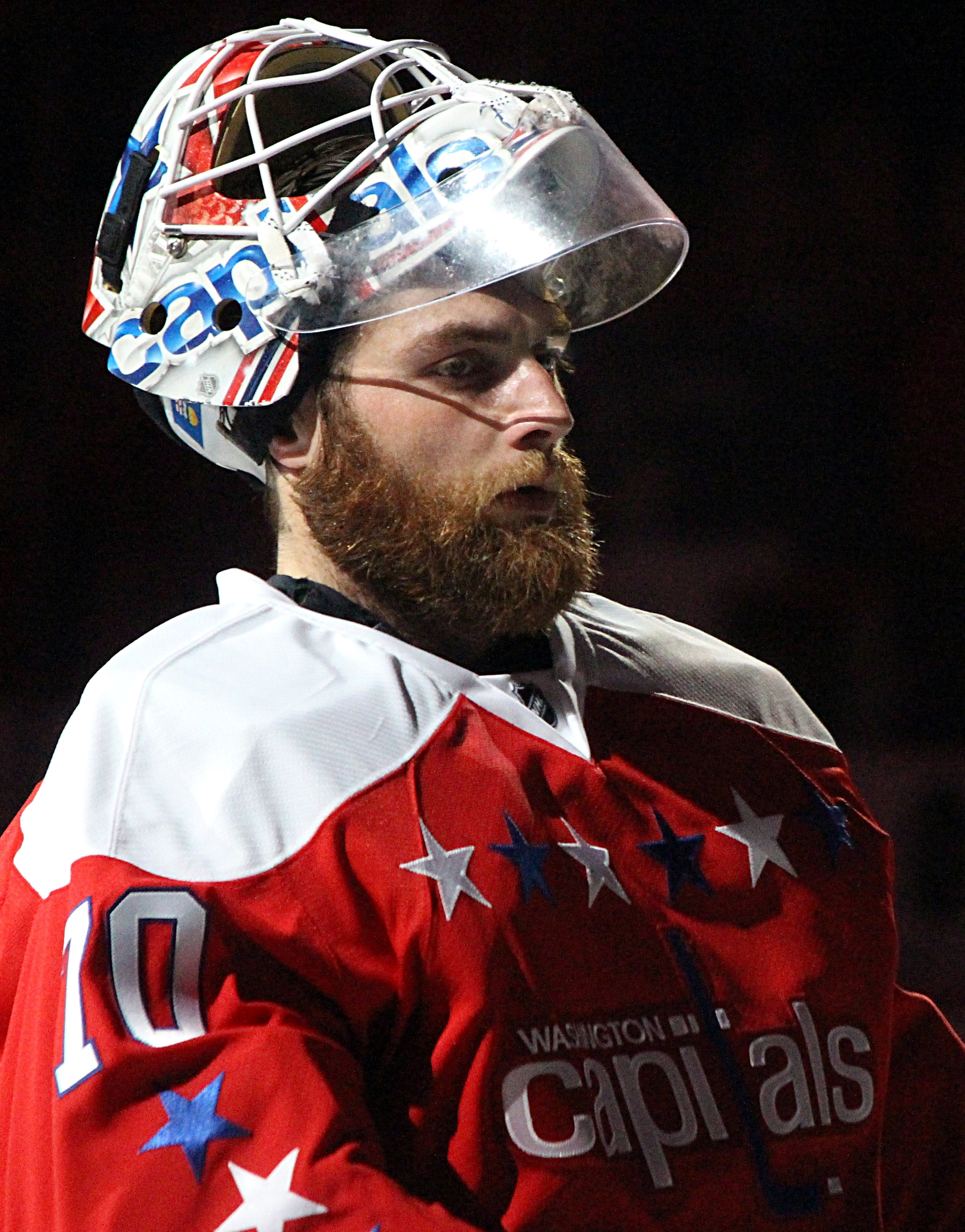
Holtby with the Capitals in April 2016.

On March 28, 2017, Holtby earned his 40th win of the season when the Capitals beat the Minnesota Wild 5–4 in overtime. This win made Holtby the third goaltender in league history to record at least 40 wins in three consecutive seasons, joining Brodeur (2005–08) and Evgeni Nabokov (2007–10).

During the 2017–18 season, Holtby became the second fastest NHL goaltender to record 200 career wins behind Ken Dryden. He recorded this feat on November 10, 2017, when the Capitals beat the Pittsburgh Penguins 4–1. He was also named an NHL All-Star for the third consecutive season. Holtby ended the season with a 34–16–4 record in 54 games played as the Capitals finished the season as the second seed in the Eastern Conference. Capitals' head coach Barry Trotz opted to choose back-up goaltender Philipp Grubauer to start the 2018 playoffs. After Grubauer struggled against the seventh-seeded Columbus Blue Jackets in the first two games, Holtby stepped in as the Capitals starting goaltender, not being pulled for the remainder of the playoffs. Holtby helped to lead the Capitals to their first Stanley Cup in franchise history, posting a record of 16–7, a .922 save percentage, a 2.16 goals against average and two consecutive shutouts against the top-seeded Tampa Bay Lightning in the Eastern Conference Finals. Holtby is remembered for a play during game two of the 2018 Stanley Cup Final, in which he made a sprawling stick save on an open-net shot by Vegas Golden Knights forward Alex Tuch. If Tuch had scored, the Golden Knights would have tied the game with two minutes remaining in the third period. Many people refer to Holtby's stick save as "The Save". Holtby finished third in Conn Smythe Trophy voting as playoff MVP, tied with Golden Knights goaltender Marc-André Fleury, behind only teammates winger and captain Alexander Ovechkin and centre Evgeny Kuznetsov, the former of which won the trophy.

After starting the 2018–19 season slowly with a 3.62 GAA with a .888 save percentage in 13 games, Holtby made 41 of 42 saves in a 2–1 win on November 7, 2018, over the Pittsburgh Penguins.

On October 14, 2019, Holtby allowed three consecutive goals to start in a game versus the Colorado Avalanche before subsequently being pulled. He became the 13th goaltender to give up three goals on three shots since NHL began recording stats about shots on goal in the 1980s.

==== Vancouver Canucks (2020–2021) ====
On October 9, 2020, Holtby signed a two-year, $8.6 million contract with the Vancouver Canucks. In the pandemic-shortened 2020–21 season, Holtby, after initially sharing the net with Thatcher Demko, was relegated as the club's clear backup option and finished with a 7–11–3 record in 21 games and posting a 3.67 goals-against average and an .889 save percentage, his highest GAA and lowest save percentage of his 11-season NHL career.

Holtby was exposed by the Canucks in the 2021 NHL expansion draft and, after going unclaimed, he was placed on unconditional waivers for the purpose of buying out the final year of his contract on July 27, 2021. He cleared waivers and the Canucks bought out his contract, making him an unrestricted free agent.

==== Dallas Stars (2021–2022) ====
On July 28, 2021, Holtby signed as a free agent to a one-year, $2 million contract with the Dallas Stars. On November 30, Holtby had his 293rd win, which is the most by an NHL goaltender in 500 games. Due to the division adjustments during the 2020–21 season, Holtby faced the Capitals for the first time since he left the team on January 28, 2022, in a 5–0 loss. On March 21, Holtby was placed on the long-term injured reserve list for the Stars due to a lower body injury. In the summer of 2022, it was reported that Holtby would likely miss the entire 2022–23 season and could potentially be forced to retire. Ultimately, Holtby did not play either of the following two seasons.

== Personal life ==
Holtby was born in Lloydminster, Saskatchewan, but was raised in Marshall, Saskatchewan. Holtby and his wife Brandi (née Bodnar) have two children and resided in Alexandria, Virginia, for the 10 years he played for Washington. They relocated to Vancouver, British Columbia, after he signed with the Canucks for the 2020–21 season, then to Dallas when he joined the Stars. During their move to Vancouver, Holtby was stopped at the border by the U.S. Fish and Wildlife Service due to missing paperwork that would allow the family's two pet tortoises, Honey and Maple, to cross into Canada. Despite selling their home in Alexandria, the Holtbys purchased a home in Washington, D.C., within two years of signing elsewhere and planned to live there after he retires.

=== Activism ===
Prior to the 2014 Winter Olympics in Russia, Holtby said that more could be done to protest Russia's new anti-gay laws by attending the games than by sitting them out and that a boycott "would cause more problems than it would solve."

He served as the Capitals' LGBTQ+-inclusion ambassador from 2017 until his departure, a position that earned him a DC Pride Ally Award from the Capital Pride Alliance, and attended the Capital Pride parade for a number of years while in Washington. He credits his dedication to LGBTQ+ issues to stumbling upon a Human Rights Campaign (HRC) Action Center housed in Harvey Milk's home in San Francisco while on his honeymoon. In 2018, he spoke at the HRC's annual dinner, where he introduced Adam Rippon; the following year, he headed a fundraiser with Monumental Sports and raised $18,300 benefitting HRC.

He was one of three Capitals players (the others being Brett Connolly and Devante Smith-Pelly) who declined to visit the White House during the Trump administration after winning the Stanley Cup, an NHL tradition, saying he needed to "stay true to [his] values."

Following the murder of George Floyd and the subsequent protests, Holtby posted on Twitter for the first time in three years to show his support for the Black Lives Matter movement, recognizing himself as someone in the "white privileged category," and urging others to speak up. He and his wife held an auction during the summer of 2020 and raised nearly $40,000 for Black Lives Matter DC and the Leadership Conference on Civil and Human Rights.

In late 2020, artist David Gunnarsson revealed Holtby's first custom Canucks mask, which featured a thunderbird. Following pushback on the design for culturally appropriating First Nations communities, the mask was pulled and Holtby appeared on CTV News to apologize and share that he would not wear the mask. Gunnarson and Coast Salish artist Luke Marston collaborated on his new mask, which featured the legend of the Gonakadet, or Sea-Wolf, which stresses the importance of family units traveling and hunting together.

== Career statistics ==
=== Regular season and playoffs ===
Bold indicates led league

			Regular season									Playoffs
Season	Team	League	GP	W	L	OT	MIN	GA	SO	GAA	SV%	GP	W	L	MIN	GA	SO	GAA	SV%
2005–06	Saskatoon Blades	WHL	1	0	1	0	59	4	0	4.07	.925	—	—	—	—	—	—	—	—
2006–07	Saskatoon Blades	WHL	51	17	29	3	2725	146	0	3.21	.895	—	—	—	—	—	—	—	—
2007–08	Saskatoon Blades	WHL	64	25	29	8	3632	172	1	2.84	.908	—	—	—	—	—	—	—	—
2008–09	Saskatoon Blades	WHL	**61**	40	16	4	**3571**	156	6	2.62	.910	7	3	4	414	16	0	2.32	.912
2009–10	Hershey Bears	AHL	37	25	8	2	2146	83	2	2.32	.917	3	2	1	200	12	0	3.60	.857
2009–10	South Carolina Stingrays	ECHL	12	7	2	3	712	35	0	2.95	.911	—	—	—	—	—	—	—	—
2010–11	Hershey Bears	AHL	30	17	10	2	1785	68	5	2.29	.920	6	2	4	359	18	0	3.01	.893
2010–11	Washington Capitals	NHL	14	10	2	2	735	22	2	1.79	.934	—	—	—	—	—	—	—	—
2011–12	Hershey Bears	AHL	40	20	15	2	2322	101	3	2.61	.906	—	—	—	—	—	—	—	—
2011–12	Washington Capitals	NHL	7	4	2	1	361	15	1	2.49	.922	14	7	7	922	30	0	1.95	.935
2012–13	Hershey Bears	AHL	25	12	12	1	1458	52	4	2.14	.932	—	—	—	—	—	—	—	—
2012–13	Washington Capitals	NHL	36	23	12	1	2089	90	4	2.58	.920	7	3	4	433	16	1	2.22	.922
2013–14	Washington Capitals	NHL	48	23	15	4	2656	126	4	2.85	.915	—	—	—	—	—	—	—	—
2014–15	Washington Capitals	NHL	**73**	41	20	10	**4247**	157	9	2.22	.923	13	6	7	806	23	1	1.71	**.944**
2015–16	Washington Capitals	NHL	66	**48**	9	7	3841	141	3	2.20	.922	12	6	6	732	21	2	1.72	.942
2016–17	Washington Capitals	NHL	63	**42**	13	6	3681	127	**9**	2.07	.925	13	7	6	804	33	0	2.47	.909
2017–18	Washington Capitals	NHL	54	34	16	4	3068	153	0	2.99	.907	**23**	**16**	7	**1386**	**50**	2	2.16	.922
2018–19	Washington Capitals	NHL	59	32	19	5	3407	160	3	2.82	.911	7	3	4	449	20	1	2.67	.914
2019–20	Washington Capitals	NHL	48	25	14	6	2744	142	0	3.11	.897	8	2	5	483	20	0	2.48	.906
2020–21	Vancouver Canucks	NHL	21	7	11	3	1260	77	0	3.67	.889	—	—	—	—	—	—	—	—
2021–22	Dallas Stars	NHL	24	10	10	1	1319	61	0	2.78	.913	—	—	—	—	—	—	—	—
NHL totals			513	299	143	50	29,408	1,271	35	2.59	.915	97	50	46	6,013	213	7	2.13	.926

=== International ===
Medal record

Men's ice hockey

Representing Canada

Canada Cup/World Cup
Gold medal – first place	2016 Toronto	

Year	Team	Event	GP	W	L	T	MIN	GA	SO	GAA	SV%
2007	Canada	U18	1	—	—	—	—	2	0	13.58	.833
2016	Canada	WCH	—	—	—	—	—	—	—	—	—
Junior totals			1	—	—	—	—	2	0	13.58	.833

== Awards and honours ==
Awards	Year
WHL
East first All-Star team	2009
NHL
Stanley Cup champion	2018
NHL All-Star Game	2016, 2017, 2018, 2019, 2020
Vezina Trophy	2016
William M. Jennings Trophy	2017
NHL first All-Star team	2016
NHL second All-Star team	2017

Awards and achievements
Preceded by Carey Price	Winner of the Vezina Trophy; 2016	Succeeded by Sergei Bobrovsky
Preceded by Frederik Andersen; John Gibson	Winner of the William M. Jennings Trophy; 2017	Succeeded by Jonathan Quick
