= Don Beaupré =

Canadian ice hockey player (born 1961)

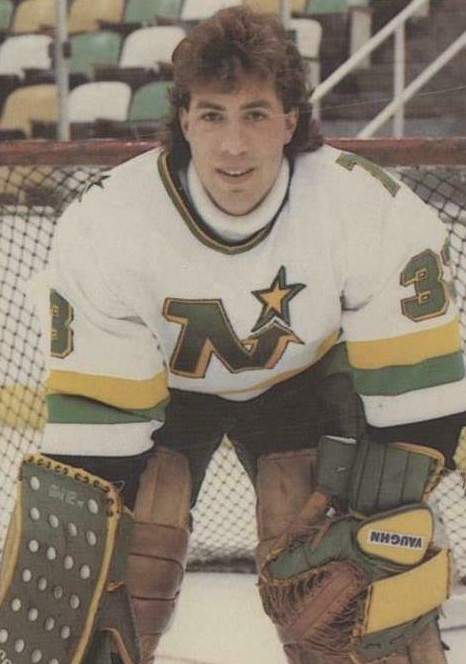
- Beaupré with the Minnesota North Stars in 1984
- Born: September 19, 1961 (age 65) Waterloo, Ontario, Canada
- Height: 5 ft 8 in (173 cm)
- Weight: 150 lb (68 kg; 10 st 10 lb)
- Position: Goaltender
- Caught: Left
- Played for: Minnesota North Stars; Washington Capitals; Ottawa Senators; Toronto Maple Leafs
- NHL draft: 37th overall, 1980; Minnesota North Stars
- Playing career: 1980–1997

Donald William Beaupré (born September 19, 1961) is a Canadian former professional ice hockey goaltender who played in the National Hockey League (NHL) for 17 seasons with the Minnesota North Stars, Washington Capitals, Ottawa Senators, and Toronto Maple Leafs.

A two-time NHL All-Star, Beaupré played in the 33rd National Hockey League All-Star Game in 1981 and 43rd National Hockey League All-Star Game in 1992. As a rookie in 1981, Beaupré appeared in the Stanley Cup Finals with the North Stars, losing to the New York Islanders.

== Playing career ==
Beaupré emerged as a goaltender in the OHA for the Sudbury Wolves. In 1979–80 he won 28 games and was named to the league's first All-star team.

As one of the top rated goalies in the 1980 NHL entry draft, Beaupré was claimed 37th overall by the Minnesota North Stars. In 1981 with Minnesota, Beaupré split goaltending with Gilles Meloche and in his rookie year appeared in the 1981 All-Star Game (his other All-Star appearance would come in 1993), and although Minnesota would lose the series, recorded a 4–2 win in Game 4 of the 1981 Stanley Cup Finals against the powerful New York Islanders.

Traded in 1989 to the Washington Capitals, Beaupré continued to play well and benefit from Washington's solid defence in the early 1990s. He led the NHL with five shutouts in 1990–91, then won a career-high 29 games the next year. By the mid-'90s, the Capitals were looking to Olaf Kolzig to lead them in goal. Beaupré was shipped to the weak Ottawa Senators where he saw plenty of rubber in 71 games over two seasons. Beaupré became the first Ottawa netminder to register a shutout. By the time he was traded to Toronto in 1995–96, the veteran's reflexes were disappearing with age. He retired in 1997, after spending most of the season with the St. John's Maple Leafs of the AHL.

Beaupré is the owner and president of an aerial lift equipment company in Minneapolis.

== Awards and achievements ==
- NHL All-Star Game (1981, 1992)

== Career statistics ==
Bold indicates led league

			Regular season									Playoffs
Season	Team	League	GP	W	L	T	MIN	GA	SO	GAA	SV%	GP	W	L	MIN	GA	SO	GAA	SV%
1978–79	Sudbury Wolves	OMJHL	54	—	—	—	3248	260	2	4.78	—	10	—	—	600	44	0	4.40	—
1979–80	Sudbury Wolves	OMJHL	59	28	29	2	3447	248	0	4.32	—	9	5	4	552	38	0	4.13	—
1980–81	Minnesota North Stars	NHL	44	18	14	11	2585	138	0	3.20	.895	6	4	2	360	26	0	4.33	.881
1981–82	Minnesota North Stars	NHL	29	11	8	9	1634	101	0	3.71	.889	2	0	1	60	4	0	4.00	.852
1981–82	Nashville South Stars	CHL	5	2	3	0	299	25	0	5.02	.857	—	—	—	—	—	—	—	—
1982–83	Minnesota North Stars	NHL	36	19	10	5	2011	120	0	3.58	.885	4	2	2	245	20	0	4.90	.853
1982–83	Birmingham South Stars	CHL	10	8	2	0	599	31	0	3.11	.906	—	—	—	—	—	—	—	—
1983–84	Minnesota North Stars	NHL	33	16	13	2	1791	123	0	4.12	.873	13	6	7	782	40	1	3.07	.895
1983–84	Salt Lake Golden Eagles	CHL	7	2	5	0	419	30	0	4.30	—	—	—	—	—	—	—	—	—
1984–85	Minnesota North Stars	NHL	31	10	17	3	1770	109	1	3.69	.883	4	1	1	184	12	0	3.91	.850
1985–86	Minnesota North Stars	NHL	52	25	20	6	3073	182	1	3.55	.892	5	2	3	300	17	0	3.40	.892
1986–87	Minnesota North Stars	NHL	47	17	20	6	2622	174	1	3.98	.879	—	—	—	—	—	—	—	—
1987–88	Minnesota North Stars	NHL	43	10	22	3	2284	161	0	4.23	.872	—	—	—	—	—	—	—	—
1988–89	Minnesota North Stars	NHL	1	0	1	0	59	3	0	3.03	.880	—	—	—	—	—	—	—	—
1988–89	Kalamazoo Wings	IHL	3	1	2	0	179	9	1	3.02	—	—	—	—	—	—	—	—	—
1988–89	Washington Capitals	NHL	11	5	4	0	578	28	1	2.91	.896	—	—	—	—	—	—	—	—
1988–89	Baltimore Skipjacks	AHL	30	14	12	2	1715	102	0	3.57	.881	—	—	—	—	—	—	—	—
1989–90	Washington Capitals	NHL	48	23	18	5	2793	150	2	3.22	.890	8	4	3	401	18	0	2.69	.903
1990–91	Washington Capitals	NHL	45	20	18	3	2572	113	**5**	2.64	.897	11	5	5	624	29	**1**	2.79	.901
1990–91	Baltimore Skipjacks	AHL	2	2	0	0	120	3	0	1.50	.942	—	—	—	—	—	—	—	—
1991–92	Washington Capitals	NHL	54	29	17	6	3108	166	1	3.20	.884	7	3	4	419	22	0	3.15	.896
1991–92	Baltimore Skipjacks	AHL	3	1	1	1	184	10	0	3.26	.865	—	—	—	—	—	—	—	—
1992–93	Washington Capitals	NHL	58	27	23	5	3282	181	1	3.31	.882	2	1	1	119	9	0	4.55	.862
1993–94	Washington Capitals	NHL	53	24	16	8	2853	135	2	2.84	.880	8	5	2	429	21	1	2.94	.890
1994–95	Ottawa Senators	NHL	38	8	**25**	3	2161	121	1	3.36	.896	—	—	—	—	—	—	—	—
1995–96	Ottawa Senators	NHL	33	6	23	0	1770	110	1	3.73	.877	—	—	—	—	—	—	—	—
1995–96	Toronto Maple Leafs	NHL	8	0	5	0	336	26	0	4.64	.847	2	0	0	20	2	0	5.88	.846
1996–97	Toronto Maple Leafs	NHL	3	0	3	0	110	10	0	5.46	.833	—	—	—	—	—	—	—	—
1996–97	St. John's Maple Leafs	AHL	47	24	16	4	2623	128	3	2.93	.898	—	—	—	—	—	—	—	—
1996–97	Utah Grizzlies	IHL	4	2	2	0	238	13	0	3.27	.877	7	3	4	438	17	1	2.32	—
NHL totals			667	268	277	75	37,392	2151	17	3.45	.885	72	33	31	3943	220	3	3.35	.888
