= Olaf Kölzig =

German ice hockey player (born 1970)

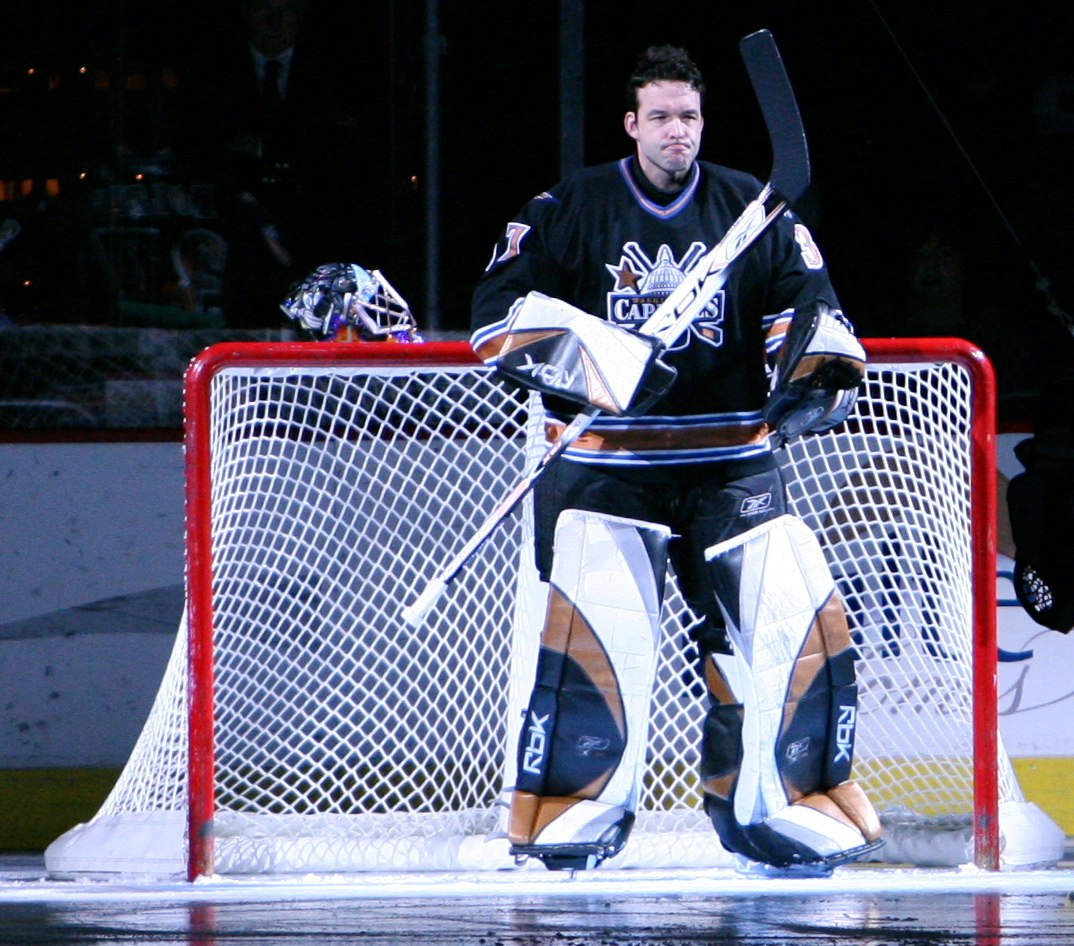
- Kölzig with the Washington Capitals in 2007
- Born: 6 April 1970 (age 56) Johannesburg, South Africa
- Height: 6 ft 3 in (191 cm)
- Weight: 221 lb (100 kg; 15 st 11 lb)
- Position: Goaltender
- Caught: Left
- Played for: Washington Capitals; Eisbären Berlin; Tampa Bay Lightning
- National team: Germany
- NHL draft: 19th overall, 1989; Washington Capitals
- Playing career: 1989–2009

Olaf Kölzig (born 6 April 1970) is a South African-born German former professional ice hockey goaltender. He is a goaltender coach and player development coach for the Washington Capitals of the National Hockey League (NHL). With the exception of eight games with the Tampa Bay Lightning, he played his entire 14-year NHL career with the Capitals.

Nicknamed "Olie the Goalie" and "Godzilla", Kölzig was born in South Africa to German parents and grew up in several cities in Canada. His family moved to Union Bay, British Columbia, when he was a teenager. Kölzig never applied for Canadian citizenship, which allowed him to represent Germany internationally. Kölzig ranks among the NHL's top 30 in career saves (15th with 18,233), wins (28th with 303), games (23rd with 719), and minutes (23rd with 41,671).

== Playing career ==
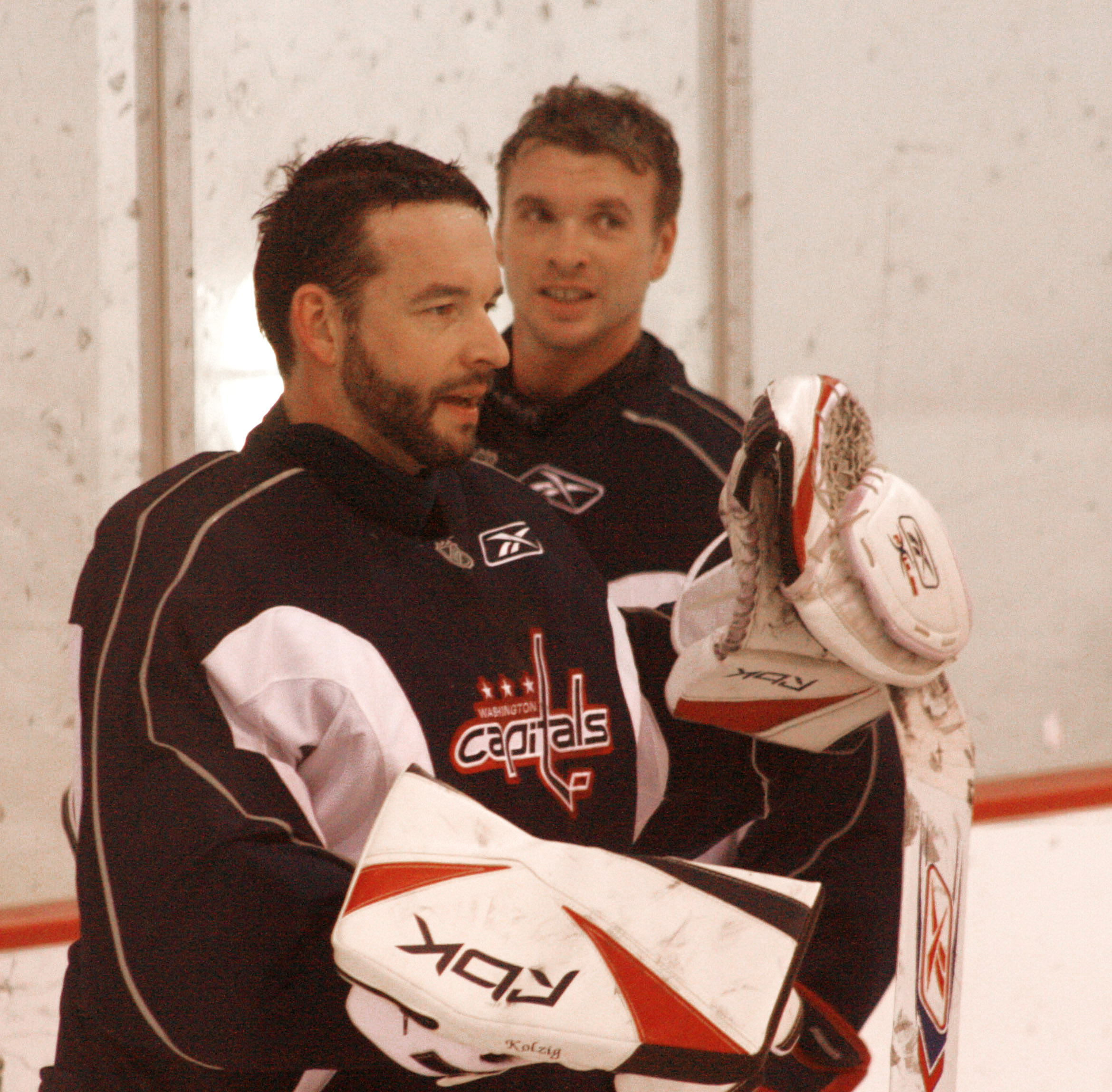
Kölzig and Brent Johnson during a Capitals' practice session in January 2008

Kölzig played major junior hockey for the New Westminster Bruins and Tri-City Americans of the Western Hockey League (WHL). During his time with the Americans, he had an on-ice fistfight with Portland Winter Hawks goaltender Byron Dafoe, who also settled in the Comox Valley with his family at a young age. Dafoe and Kolzig would later get in a fist fight in the NHL on November 28, 1998 during a line brawl in a game between the Boston Bruins and Washington Capitals. Ironically, Olaf Kölzig and Byron Dafoe were each other's best man at their respective weddings. On 29 November 1989, Kölzig scored a goal while playing for Tri-City.

The Capitals selected Kölzig in the 1989 NHL entry draft. Kölzig played his first NHL game in the 1989–90 NHL season, but was sent down to the minors where he remained for several years. He spent several years in the American Hockey League (AHL) with the Baltimore Skipjacks, Rochester Americans, and Portland Pirates, and one year with the Hampton Roads Admirals of the East Coast Hockey League (ECHL). In 1994, as a member of the Pirates, he won both the 1994 Jack A. Butterfield Trophy as MVP of the AHL playoffs, and the 1994 Hap Holmes Memorial Award.

During the 1995–96 NHL season, the Capitals recalled Kölzig to serve as backup for Jim Carey. When the Capitals acquired Bill Ranford from the Boston Bruins for the 1996–97 NHL season, Kölzig remained as backup. In Washington's first game of the 1997-98 season, Ranford suffered an injury and Kölzig took over. Kölzig played well for the rest of the season, winning a total of 33 games and achieving a 2.20 goals against average. He backstopped the Capitals to the Stanley Cup Final, being one of only 21 goalies in NHL history to record four shutouts in one postseason. Despite his success, the Capitals were swept in the finals by the defending champions, the Detroit Red Wings.

He also played in the 1998 All-Star Game, in which he made 14 saves on 17 shots. During the 2004–05 NHL lock-out he signed with the German club Eisbären Berlin. In his first game in Cologne against the Sharks, he registered a shootout in a 1-0 victory. On 11 February 2006, Kölzig signed a two-year, $10.9 million extension with the Capitals. In February 2007, in the midst of a 19–19–5 season, Kölzig tore his medial collateral ligament (MCL). Prior to this injury, Kölzig had missed only 18 games and never more than four in a row.

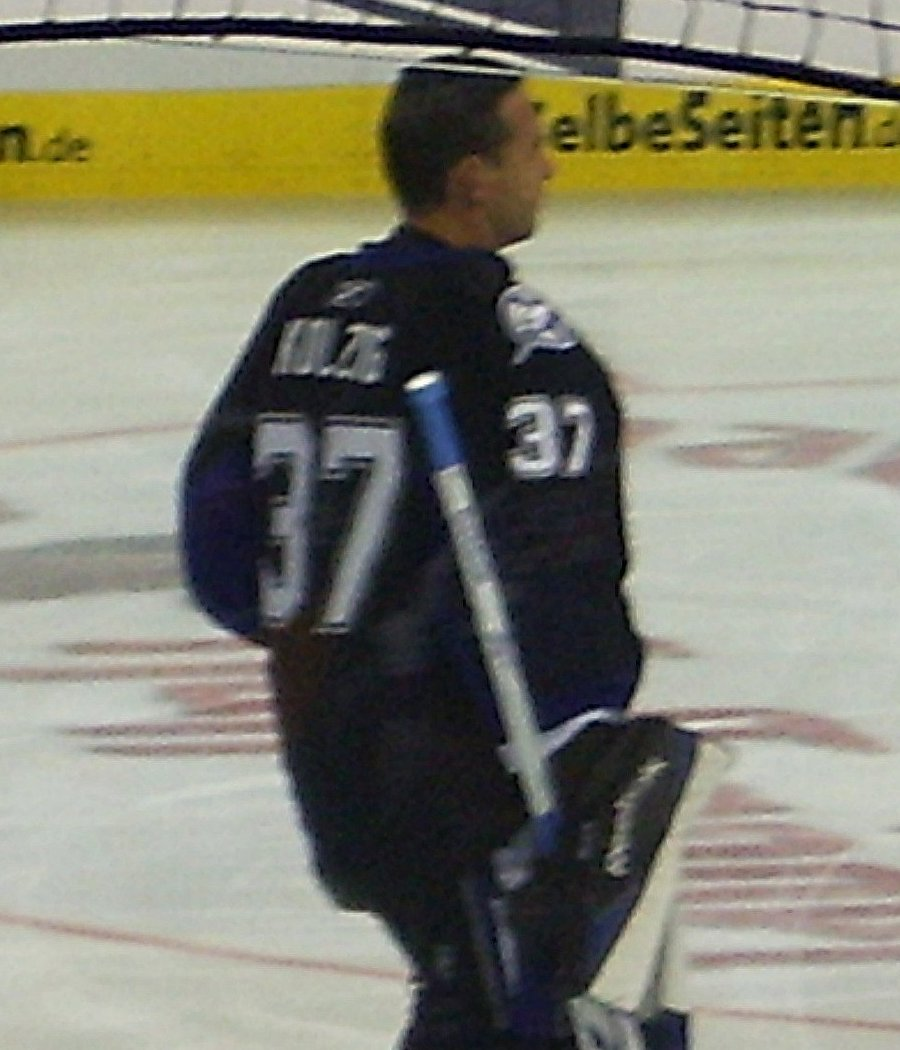
Kölzig in September 2008

The Capitals qualified for the playoffs, and Huet started every game in their first round series against the Philadelphia Flyers. The Capitals lost in seven games. A few weeks after their elimination, Kölzig announced he did not intend to return to the team. On 1 July 2008, Kölzig became an unrestricted free agent and signed a $1.5 million, 1-year contract with the Tampa Bay Lightning, where he served as the back-up goalie to Mike Smith. Upon Kölzig's return to D.C. as a member of Tampa Bay, he was loudly cheered and a video in tribute to his time with the Caps was shown. On 28 January 2009, it was announced that Kölzig would miss the rest of the 2008–09 season due to a ruptured biceps tendon in his left arm.

Kölzig was traded to the Toronto Maple Leafs along with Jamie Heward, Andy Rogers and a 4th round pick on 4 March 2009 as part of a trade deadline deal for Richard Petiot. As he was at that time suffering from an injury that would see him out for the rest of the 2008–09 season, the end of which would also see his contract expire, his acquisition from Tampa Bay was largely seen as an effort by Toronto general manager Brian Burke to "buy" the 4th round pick by taking on Kölzig's deadweight salary.

On 23 September 2009, Kölzig announced his retirement from the NHL. Later that year, Kölzig was named to the ECHL Hall of Fame at the 2010 ECHL All-Star Game in Ontario, California. The Capitals have not issued Kölzig's number 37 to anyone since his retirement.

== Personal life ==
In 2005, Kölzig and fellow Tri-City Americans alumnus Stu Barnes became part of an ownership group in their former major junior team, assuring the existence of the Americans in Kennewick, Washington.

Kölzig is known for his service off the ice as well as his accomplishments on the ice. Along with fellow NHLers Byron Dafoe and Scott Mellanby, he founded Athletes Against Autism to raise awareness of autism and encourage more research, as well as the Carson Kolzig Foundation for Youth Autism in honour of his son, who is autistic. Because of his local and national service, he was awarded the NHL's King Clancy Memorial Trophy for humanitarian service in 2006, named one of the 10 Washingtonians of the Year by Washingtonian Magazine in 2000, and one of only four non-Canadian winners to receive the NHL Foundation Player Award.

Kölzig was a fan of the Toronto Maple Leafs while growing up.

== International play ==
Kölzig was the starting goaltender for the German Olympic team at the 1998 Winter Olympics in Nagano, Japan recording a 1.00 GAA and went 2–0. He played for Germany at the 2004 World Cup of Hockey, and went 0–3 with a 3.34 GAA. Kölzig also started in goal for Germany at the 2006 Winter Olympics in Turin, Italy.

== Career statistics ==
=== Regular season and playoffs ===
Bold indicates led league

			Regular season										Playoffs
Season	Team	League	GP	W	L	T	OTL	MIN	GA	SO	GAA	SV%	GP	W	L	MIN	GA	SO	GAA	SV%
1987–88	New Westminster Bruins	WHL	15	6	5	0	—	2333	156	0	4.01	—	3	0	3	149	11	0	4.43	—
1988–89	Tri-City Americans	WHL	30	16	10	2	—	1671	97	1	3.48	—	—	—	—	—	—	—	—	—
1989–90	Tri-City Americans	WHL	48	27	16	4	—	2504	187	1	4.48	—	6	4	0	318	27	0	5.09	—
1989–90	Washington Capitals	NHL	2	0	2	0	—	120	12	0	6.00	.810	—	—	—	—	—	—	—	—
1990–91	Hampton Roads Admirals	ECHL	21	11	9	1	—	1248	71	2	3.41	.890	3	1	2	180	14	0	4.66	—
1990–91	Baltimore Skipjacks	AHL	26	10	12	1	—	1367	72	0	3.16	.889	—	—	—	—	—	—	—	—
1991–92	Hampton Roads Admirals	ECHL	14	11	3	0	—	847	41	0	2.90	.914	—	—	—	—	—	—	—	—
1991–92	Baltimore Skipjacks	AHL	28	5	17	2	—	1503	105	1	4.19	.878	—	—	—	—	—	—	—	—
1992–93	Rochester Americans	AHL	49	25	16	4	—	2737	168	0	3.68	.882	17	9	8	1040	61	0	3.52	—
1992–93	Washington Capitals	NHL	1	0	0	0	—	20	2	0	6.00	.714	—	—	—	—	—	—	—	—
1993–94	Portland Pirates	AHL	29	16	8	5	—	1725	88	3	3.06	.906	17	12	5	1035	44	0	2.55	—
1993–94	Washington Capitals	NHL	7	0	3	0	—	224	20	0	5.36	.844	—	—	—	—	—	—	—	—
1994–95	Portland Pirates	AHL	2	1	0	1	—	125	3	0	1.44	.952	—	—	—	—	—	—	—	—
1994–95	Washington Capitals	NHL	14	2	8	2	—	724	30	0	2.49	.902	2	1	0	44	1	1	**1.35**	.952
1995–96	Portland Pirates	AHL	5	5	0	0	—	300	7	1	1.40	.957	—	—	—	—	—	—	—	—
1995–96	Washington Capitals	NHL	18	4	8	2	—	897	46	0	3.08	.887	5	2	3	341	11	0	1.93	**.934**
1996–97	Washington Capitals	NHL	29	8	15	4	—	1644	71	2	2.59	.906	—	—	—	—	—	—	—	—
1997–98	Washington Capitals	NHL	64	33	18	10	—	3788	139	5	2.20	.920	21	12	**9**	1351	44	**4**	1.95	**.941**
1998–99	Washington Capitals	NHL	64	26	**31**	3	—	3586	154	4	2.58	.900	—	—	—	—	—	—	—	—
1999–2000	Washington Capitals	NHL	73	41	20	11	—	**4371**	163	5	2.24	.917	5	1	4	284	16	0	3.38	.845
2000–01	Washington Capitals	NHL	72	37	26	8	—	4279	177	5	2.48	.909	6	2	4	375	14	1	2.24	.908
2001–02	Washington Capitals	NHL	71	31	29	8	—	4131	**192**	6	2.79	.903	—	—	—	—	—	—	—	—
2002–03	Washington Capitals	NHL	66	33	25	6	—	3894	156	4	2.40	.919	6	2	4	404	14	1	2.08	.927
2003–04	Washington Capitals	NHL	63	19	35	9	—	3738	**180**	2	2.89	.908	—	—	—	—	—	—	—	—
2004–05	Eisbären Berlin	DEL	8	—	—	—	—	452	19	2	2.52	.905	3	—	—	178	7	1	2.36	—
2005–06	Washington Capitals	NHL	59	20	28	—	**11**	3506	206	0	3.53	.896	—	—	—	—	—	—	—	—
2006–07	Washington Capitals	NHL	54	22	24	—	6	3184	159	1	3.00	.910	—	—	—	—	—	—	—	—
2007–08	Washington Capitals	NHL	54	25	21	—	6	3154	153	1	2.91	.892	—	—	—	—	—	—	—	—
2008–09	Tampa Bay Lightning	NHL	8	2	4	—	1	410	25	0	3.66	.898	—	—	—	—	—	—	—	—
NHL totals			719	303	297	63	24	41,670	1,885	35	2.71	.906	45	20	24	2,799	100	7	2.14	.927

=== International ===
Year	Team	Event	GP	W	L	T	MIN	GA	SO	GAA	SV%
1996	Germany	WCH	1	0	1	0	45	5	0	6.67	.886
1997	Germany	WC	4	0	3	0	199	13	0	3.92	.891
1998	Germany	OLY	2	2	0	0	120	2	1	1.00	.966
2004	Germany	WC	5	2	2	1	299	11	0	2.21	.921
2004	Germany	WCH	3	0	3	0	180	10	0	3.34	.905
2006	Germany	OLY	3	0	1	2	179	8	0	2.68	.899
Senior totals			18	4	10	3	1022	49	1	2.88	.915

== Awards and achievements ==
=== As a player ===
- WHL West Second All-Star Team – 1989
- Jack A. Butterfield Trophy – 1994
- Hap Holmes Memorial Award – 1994 (along with Byron Dafoe)
- NHL All-Star Game – 1998 and 2000
- Vezina Trophy – 2000
- NHL First All-Star Team – 2000
- NHL Foundation Player Award – 2001
- DEL champion – 2004–05
- King Clancy Memorial Trophy – 2006
- One of Ten "Washingtonians of the Year" (from Washingtonian Magazine) – 2000
- ECHL Hall of Fame Inductee, Developmental Player – 2010

=== As a coach ===
- Stanley Cup champion – 2018

== Washington Capitals records ==
The records below are amongst goaltenders only.

=== Career ===
- Most career games played (711).
- Most career wins (301).
- Most career losses (293).
- Most career ties (86).
- Most career minutes played (41,261).
- Most goals allowed (1,860).
- Most career shutouts (35).
- Most career points scored (17).

=== Regular season ===
- Most games played in a season (73 in 2000) (Tied with Braden Holtby).
- Most minutes played in a season (4,371 in 2000).
- Most ties in a season (11 in 2000).

=== Playoffs ===
- Most career playoffs shutouts (6).
- Most career playoffs penalty minutes (12).

Awards and achievements
Preceded by Reggie Savage	Washington Capitals first-round draft pick 1989	Succeeded by John Slaney
Preceded by Dominik Hašek	Winner of the Vezina Trophy; 2000	Succeeded by Dominik Hašek
Preceded by Jarome Iginla	Winner of the King Clancy Memorial Trophy; 2006	Succeeded by Saku Koivu
