= 1992–93 Los Angeles Kings season =

National Hockey League team season

1992–93 Los Angeles Kings
- Campbell Conference champions
- Division: 3rd Smythe
- Conference: 6th Campbell
- 1992–93 record: 39–35–10
- Home record: 22–15–5
- Road record: 17–20–5
- Goals for: 338
- Goals against: 340

Team information
- General manager: Nick Beverley
- Coach: Barry Melrose
- Captain: Wayne Gretzky; Luc Robitaille (interim) (Note: Robitaille served as interim captain from October through January in Gretzky's absence.)
- Alternate captains: Tony Granato (Oct.-Jan.); Paul Coffey (Oct.-Jan.); Luc Robitaille; Marty McSorley
- Arena: Great Western Forum
- Average attendance: 15,833
- Minor league affiliates: Phoenix Roadrunners (IHL); Muskegon Fury (UHL)

Team leaders
- Goals: Luc Robitaille (63)
- Assists: Luc Robitaille (62)
- Points: Luc Robitaille (125)
- Penalty minutes: Marty McSorley (399)
- Plus/minus: Jari Kurri (+19)
- Wins: Kelly Hrudey (18)
- Goals against average: Robb Stauber (3.84)

The 1992–93 Los Angeles Kings season was the team's 26th season in the National Hockey League (NHL). It saw the Kings finish in third place in the Smythe Division with a record of 39 wins, 35 losses, and 10 ties for 88 points. The Kings played their home games at the Great Western Forum.

In 1992–93, the Kings reached new levels of success, reaching the Stanley Cup Final for the first time in their history. They defeated the Calgary Flames in six games in the Division Semifinals before besting the regular-season division champion Vancouver Canucks in six games in the Division Finals. In the Campbell Conference Finals, the Kings triumphed over the Toronto Maple Leafs in a hard-fought seven-game series, sending them to the 1993 Stanley Cup Final, where they met the Montreal Canadiens. The Kings took game one of the Final, but then lost four straight games as the Canadiens took the series 4–1 and won their 24th Stanley Cup championship. The Kings finished with 93 playoff goals, the most playoff goals scored by a team that did not win the Stanley Cup and the seventh-most overall by any team in the playoffs.

== Offseason ==
In the 1992 NHL entry draft, the Kings chose Justin Hocking with their first pick, 39th overall, in the second round.

== Regular season ==
On Sunday, November 8, 1992, three Los Angeles Kings (Mike Donnelly, Jari Kurri and Luc Robitaille) scored a hat trick in an 11-4 win at San Jose.

On March 13, the Kings road game against the Philadelphia Flyers was postponed after one period after high winds from the 1993 Storm of the Century smashed a large window at the Spectrum. It was the first in-progress game in NHL history to be postponed due to weather. The game was restarted from the beginning on April 1.

The Kings were the most penalized team during the regular season, being shorthanded 529 times.

Los Angeles finished with 2,855 shots on goal during the regular season, second only to the Boston Bruins.

=== Final standings ===
Smythe Division
	GP	W	L	T	Pts	GF	GA
**Vancouver Canucks**	84	46	29	9	**101**	346	278
**Calgary Flames**	84	43	30	11	**97**	322	282
**Los Angeles Kings**	84	39	35	10	**88**	338	340
**Winnipeg Jets**	84	40	37	7	**87**	322	320
Edmonton Oilers	84	26	50	8	60	242	337
San Jose Sharks	84	11	71	2	24	218	414

Note: GP = Games played, W = Wins, L = Losses, T = Ties, Pts = Points, GF = Goals for, GA = Goals against
Note: Teams that qualified for the playoffs are highlighted in bold.

== Playoffs ==
=== Division Semifinals ===
The Kings qualified for the 1993 Stanley Cup playoffs by virtue of their third-place finish in the Smythe Division. In the Smythe Division Semifinals, the third-seeded Kings met the Calgary Flames, who had finished second in the Smythe Division during the regular season. Although Los Angeles was missing its best defenceman, Rob Blake, for Game 1 and team captain Wayne Gretzky suffered a charley horse and left midway through the contest, the Kings fired on all cylinders in a 6–3 win at the Olympic Saddledome. Defenceman Darryl Sydor scored on a pass from behind the net by Gretzky only 16 seconds into the game, and Jimmy Carson netted two power play goals. However, Calgary stormed back in Game 2, with their ace defensive centre Joel Otto scoring twice, once at even-strength and once short-handed, as part of an unanswered five-goal outburst in the second period en route to a 9–4 Flames victory. The series shifted to California for Game 3, where undisciplined play by the Kings and two goals by the Flames' Theoren Fleury, one on the power play and one shorthanded, allowed Calgary to claim a 5–2 win. Feeling he needed to shake up his team, Kings head coach Barry Melrose opted to start backup goaltender Robb Stauber, a playoff rookie, over usual starter Kelly Hrudey for Game 4. Stauber responded, stopping 28 of 29 Calgary shots, while Alexei Zhitnik, Warren Rychel, and Pat Conacher scored to give Los Angeles a 3–1 victory and a 2–2 series tie. After being held to five goals over the previous two games, the Kings' offense burst forth in Game 5, with Gretzky, Luc Robitaille, Tomas Sandström, and Tony Granato, all heretofore dormant, erupting for a combined five goals and six assists in a 9–4 rout of the Flames, putting Los Angeles one win away from the second round. Not to be denied, the Kings' onslaught continued in Game 6, as Sandström's two goals, Jari Kurri's goal and three assists, and Gretzky's goal and two assists led to a decisive 9–6 victory and a 4–2 series win, the team's first playoff series triumph since 1991. Los Angeles set a club playoff record by scoring 33 goals in six games, surpassing their previous mark of 29 goals in a series.

=== Division Finals ===
In the Smythe Division Finals, the Kings' opponents were the Vancouver Canucks, who had finished in first place in the Smythe Division during the regular season and upended the fourth-place Winnipeg Jets in six games in the other Smythe Division Semifinal series. The Canucks, who had won seven of nine regular-season games against Los Angeles, continued their success with a 5–2 victory in Game 1, as Dana Murzyn, Gerald Diduck, and Dave Babych – three defencemen not known for their offensive prowess – all scored for Vancouver. Game 5 in Vancouver was the first in the series to not be a blowout; instead, it was a close, tense affair that proved to be the longest playoff game in team history to that point. The Kings had a 2–1 lead after one period on goals by Gretzky and Kurri, but the Canucks tied the score at 3–3 after two periods thanks to markers by Petr Nedved and Trevor Linden. After a scoreless third period, the game went to double overtime where, after two failed wraparound attempts by Robitaille, the puck went to Gary Shuchuk at the crease, who flicked it past Vancouver goaltender Kirk McLean at 6:31 to win the game for the Kings, 4–3, and put them one victory away from the Conference Finals.

=== Conference Finals ===
In the Campbell Conference Finals, the Kings faced the Toronto Maple Leafs, who had finished in third place in the Norris Division during the regular season and defeated the Detroit Red Wings and St. Louis Blues, both in seven games, in the Division Semifinals and Division Finals, respectively. The Maple Leafs had last won the Stanley Cup in 1967 and had not even reached the Stanley Cup Final since that year. Their 1993 Conference Finals appearance was the furthest the franchise had advanced in the playoffs since 1978. There had been some animosity between the clubs heading into the series, as Toronto centre Doug Gilmour had been suspended for eight days for slashing and breaking the arm of the Kings' Tomas Sandström during a regular-season game on November 21.

The Maple Leafs opened the series with a 4–1 victory at home in Game 1, with Gilmour, the playoffs' leading scorer, recording two goals and two assists. However, the contest was marred by a hit on Gilmour by Kings defenceman Marty McSorley late in the game. Leaf captain Wendel Clark immediately fought McSorley, while Toronto defenceman Todd Gill brawled with Los Angeles forward Dave Taylor. Leafs head coach Pat Burns, who believed McSorley's hit on Gilmour was a deliberate attack ordered by the Los Angeles coaching staff, angrily confronted Kings head coach Barry Melrose, while Toronto fans threw debris on the ice. McSorley estimated that over 100 threats were called into his hotel room after the game. Sandström's goal off a Wayne Gretzky pass with 7:40 remaining allowed Los Angeles to tie the series with a 3–2 win in Game 2 before the teams headed to the Great Western Forum for Games 3 and 4. The Kings took Game 3 by a 4–2 score aided by short-handed goals from Taylor and Jari Kurri, but Toronto displayed a dominant defensive effort in Game 4, as goals by Bob Rouse and rookie Mike Eastwood in the first 6:30 sparked the Maple Leafs to a 4–2 win of their own to tie the series at 2–2. In Game 5, Glenn Anderson scored the winning goal in overtime off his own rebound to give Toronto a 3–2 victory, putting them one win away from their first Finals appearance in 26 years. In the aftermath of the game, Bob McKenzie, writing in the Toronto Star, angered Gretzky by opining that the Kings' captain looked "as though he were skating with a piano on his back." Before Game 6 in Los Angeles, Gretzky told his agent, Mike Barnett, "The piano man still has a tune to play."

Game 6, a back-and-forth affair, would prove the most controversial of the series. Clark gave Toronto a 2–1 lead early in the second period, but the Kings went ahead 4–2 on three power play goals by McSorley, Darryl Sydor, and Luc Robitaille. The Leafs stormed back in the third period, with Clark scoring two more goals to complete a hat trick and tie the game at 4–4; the tying goal came with just 81 seconds left, sending the contest into overtime. With 13 seconds left in regulation, Anderson received a boarding penalty, allowing Los Angeles to begin overtime on a power play. During the overtime period, with the Kings in the Toronto end, Gretzky's stick caught Gilmour on the chin, drawing blood. Under the rules in place at the time, the play would have resulted in a five-minute major penalty. However, after consulting with linesmen Ron Finn and Kevin Collins, referee Kerry Fraser decided against penalizing Gretzky, reasoning he did not see the play. Gretzky scored the overtime winner off the very next faceoff, handing Los Angeles a 5–4 win and tying the series at three games apiece.

The winner of the deciding seventh game in Toronto would determine the Campbell Conference representative in the 1993 Stanley Cup Final. At 9:48 of the first period, Gretzky opened the scoring with a short-handed goal off a 2-on-1 rush with McSorley, then picked up an assist when Sandström scored off a Gretzky pass in the slot to give the Kings a 2–0 lead. The Maple Leafs tied the game in the second period on goals by Clark and Anderson, but just past the midway point of the period, Gretzky scored his second goal of the contest when he took a backhand pass from Sandström and, after Toronto defenceman Kent Manderville went for the puck but missed, moved to the high slot and slapped the puck past Leaf goaltender Felix Potvin for a 3–2 Los Angeles lead. The Maple Leafs clawed back to tie the game at 3–3 early in the third period on Clark's second goal of the night. However, with 3:51 left, the Kings' Alexei Zhitnik took a shot that Rouse partially blocked and redirected to Mike Donnelly, who scored into an empty net to give Los Angeles a 4–3 advantage. Only 37 seconds later, Gretzky completed a hat trick and capped a four-point effort when, chased by Gill, he circled behind Potvin and banked the puck off the skate of Leafs defenceman Dave Ellett and into the net; the goal, which Gretzky called a "fluke", gave the Kings a 5–3 lead. Though Ellett scored with 1:07 remaining to cut the Kings' lead to one goal, Los Angeles held on for a 5–4 victory and advanced to the Stanley Cup Final for the first time in team history. Gretzky later called Game 7 the greatest game he had ever played.

=== Stanley Cup Final ===
The Kings' opponents in the 1993 Stanley Cup Finals, the Montreal Canadiens, had finished third in the Prince of Wales Conference's Adams Division during the regular season. They had defeated their provincial rivals, the Quebec Nordiques, in six games in the Division Semifinals and swept the Buffalo Sabres four straight in the Division Finals before besting the New York Islanders in five games in the Wales Conference Finals. Prior to the series, Los Angeles coach Barry Melrose suggested that the Canadiens were a team that "hasn't been tested," although Montreal had lost the first two games of their first-round series to the Nordiques before rebounding to win 11 consecutive games, tying an NHL record.

Still, the Canadiens had had eight days off since eliminating the Islanders, and the Kings took advantage of their lethargy in a 4–1 victory in Game 1 at the Montreal Forum. Montreal native Luc Robitaille scored twice on the power play, and Wayne Gretzky had a hand in all four Los Angeles goals, scoring one himself and assisting on the other three. The lone Canadiens goal came at 18:09 of the first period when Gretzky scored on his own net trying to break up a pass by Montreal's Ed Ronan, who received credit for the goal.

The turning point in the series, however, came in Game 2. The Canadiens took a 1–0 lead on a first-period goal by defenceman Éric Desjardins, but the Kings tied the score in the second period on a short-handed goal from Dave Taylor, then went in front 2–1 when Pat Conacher scored with 11:28 left in the third period. During a stoppage in play with 1:45 remaining, Montreal head coach Jacques Demers requested that referee Kerry Fraser measure the curve on the blade of Los Angeles defenceman Marty McSorley's stick. After measuring the curve, Fraser ruled McSorley's stick illegal and assessed him a minor penalty. Demers then pulled goaltender Patrick Roy for an extra attacker, giving the Canadiens a 6-on-4 power play. Desjardins scored his second goal of the game off a Vincent Damphousse pass with 1:13 left in regulation to tie the score at 2–2, sending the contest into overtime. Only 51 seconds into the extra period, Montreal's Benoît Brunet picked up a missed Desjardins slap shot and passed it back to Desjardins, who fired another shot past Kings goaltender Kelly Hrudey to win the game for the Canadiens, 3–2, and tie the series at 1–1. Desjardins became the first defenceman to ever score a hat trick in the Stanley Cup Final.

The series shifted to Los Angeles for the third and fourth games. By early in the second period of Game 3, the Canadiens had a 3–0 lead over the Kings, thanks to goals by Brian Bellows, Gilbert Dionne, and Mathieu Schneider, the latter two goals coming 21 seconds apart. However, Los Angeles received an emotional lift from a Mark Hardy hit on Mike Keane, and the team responded with goals from Robitaille, Tony Granato, and Gretzky to tie the game at 3–3. With 12.9 seconds left before the game went into overtime, Kings coach Melrose argued for a penalty shot, saying that Montreal captain Guy Carbonneau closed his hand on the puck in the goal crease, but referee Terry Gregson ruled that the puck was caught in Carbonneau's equipment instead. Only 34 seconds into overtime, John LeClair buried the puck past Hrudey to give the Canadiens a 4–3 win and a 2–1 series lead. In the fourth game, Montreal took a 2–0 lead over the Kings on a first-period Kirk Muller goal and a power-play goal by Damphousse, but Los Angeles tied the score on a second-period Mike Donnelly goal off his own rebound and a power-play goal from McSorley, who took a pass from Gretzky from behind the net. The game again went to overtime, where LeClair scored his second consecutive sudden-death winner at 14:37 of the extra period for a 3–2 Canadiens victory and a 3–1 advantage in the series. It was the third straight overtime win for Montreal and their tenth consecutive overtime victory in the playoffs; Canadiens head coach Demers opined of the overtime winning streak that it was "possibly a record that will never be beaten."

The series went back to Montreal for Game 5, which Red Fisher, the Canadiens' beat writer for the Montreal Gazette, called the team's best of the playoffs, as the Canadiens held the tiring and demoralized Kings to just 14 shots in the first two periods, and only 19 overall in the game. After Montreal took a 1–0 lead in the first period on a Paul DiPietro goal, McSorley tied the game at 2:40 of the second period by sending a wrist shot from the slot past Roy that richocheted off both goal posts. However, on the very next shift, the Canadiens regained the lead when Muller buried a loose puck past Hrudey following a failed wraparound attempt by Damphousse. Stéphan Lebeau added a power-play goal at 11:31 of the second period to give Montreal a 3–1 advantage, and DiPietro scored his second goal of the contest at 12:06 of the third period to put the game out of reach. The Canadiens held on for a 4–1 victory and clinched their 24th Stanley Cup championship with a 4–1 series win. Roy was named the winner of the Conn Smythe Trophy as the most valuable player of the Stanley Cup playoffs for the second time in his career.

== Schedule and results ==
=== Regular season ===
1992–93 regular season
October: 7–4–1 (home: 4–1–0; road: 3–3–1)

Game	Date	Score	Opponent	Record	Recap
1	October 6, 1992	5–4 OT	@ Calgary Flames (1992–93)	1–0–0	W
2	October 8, 1992	3–5	Detroit Red Wings (1992–93)	1–1–0	L
3	October 10, 1992	6–3	Winnipeg Jets (1992–93)	2–1–0	W
4	October 13, 1992	2–1	San Jose Sharks (1992–93)	3–1–0	W
5	October 15, 1992	4–0	Calgary Flames (1992–93)	4–1–0	W
6	October 17, 1992	8–6	Boston Bruins (1992–93)	5–1–0	W
7	October 20, 1992	2–6	@ Calgary Flames (1992–93)	5–2–0	L
8	October 23, 1992	2–4	@ Winnipeg Jets (1992–93)	5–3–0	L
9	October 24, 1992	5–5 OT	@ Minnesota North Stars (1992–93)	5–3–1	T
10	October 27, 1992	4–3	@ New York Islanders (1992–93)	6–3–1	W
11	October 29, 1992	3–8	@ Boston Bruins (1992–93)	6–4–1	L
12	October 31, 1992	7–1	@ Hartford Whalers (1992–93)	7–4–1	W

November: 9–3–1 (home: 6–0–0; road: 3–3–1)

Game	Date	Score	Opponent	Record	Recap
13	November 5, 1992	5–2	New Jersey Devils (1992–93)	8–4–1	W
14	November 7, 1992	5–2	Buffalo Sabres (1992–93)	9–4–1	W
15	November 8, 1992	11–4	@ San Jose Sharks (1992–93)	10–4–1	W
16	November 10, 1992	4–4 OT	@ Winnipeg Jets (1992–93)	10–4–2	T
17	November 12, 1992	7–4	Vancouver Canucks (1992–93)	11–4–2	W
18	November 14, 1992	6–2	Edmonton Oilers (1992–93)	12–4–2	W
19	November 16, 1992	3–6	@ Vancouver Canucks (1992–93)	12–5–2	L
20	November 17, 1992	0–6	@ San Jose Sharks (1992–93)	12–6–2	L
21	November 19, 1992	4–1	Chicago Blackhawks (1992–93)	13–6–2	W
22	November 21, 1992	6–4	Toronto Maple Leafs (1992–93)	14–6–2	W
23	November 25, 1992	3–1	@ Edmonton Oilers (1992–93)	15–6–2	W
24	November 27, 1992	5–3	@ Detroit Red Wings (1992–93)	16–6–2	W
25	November 28, 1992	2–3	@ Toronto Maple Leafs (1992–93)	16–7–2	L

December: 4–7–2 (home: 3–4–1; road: 1–3–1)

Game	Date	Score	Opponent	Record	Recap
26	December 1, 1992	6–3	@ Chicago Blackhawks (1992–93)	17–7–2	W
27	December 3, 1992	5–3	Pittsburgh Penguins (1992–93)	18–7–2	W
28	December 5, 1992	7–3	Hartford Whalers (1992–93)	19–7–2	W
29	December 8, 1992	5–5 OT	Montreal Canadiens (1992–93)	19–7–3	T
30	December 10, 1992	4–5	Quebec Nordiques (1992–93)	19–8–3	L
31	December 12, 1992	6–3	St. Louis Blues (1992–93)	20–8–3	W
32	December 15, 1992	2–3	Tampa Bay Lightning (1992–93)	20–9–3	L
33	December 18, 1992	5–5 OT	@ Edmonton Oilers (1992–93)	20–9–4	T
34	December 19, 1992	3–5	@ Calgary Flames (1992–93)	20–10–4	L
35	December 22, 1992	2–6	Vancouver Canucks (1992–93)	20–11–4	L
36	December 26, 1992	2–7	@ San Jose Sharks (1992–93)	20–12–4	L
37	December 29, 1992	2–10	Philadelphia Flyers (1992–93)	20–13–4	L
38	December 31, 1992	0–4	@ Vancouver Canucks (1992–93)	20–14–4	L

January: 4–7–2 (home: 1–5–2; road: 3–2–0)

Game	Date	Score	Opponent	Record	Recap
39	January 2, 1993	5–5 OT	Montreal Canadiens (1992–93)	20–14–5	T
40	January 6, 1993	3–6	Tampa Bay Lightning (1992–93)	20–15–5	L
41	January 8, 1993	3–6	@ Winnipeg Jets (1992–93)	20–16–5	L
42	January 10, 1993	5–4	@ Chicago Blackhawks (1992–93)	21–16–5	W
43	January 12, 1993	3–2	@ Ottawa Senators (1992–93)	22–16–5	W
44	January 14, 1993	1–7	@ New Jersey Devils (1992–93)	22–17–5	L
45	January 16, 1993	2–5	Winnipeg Jets (1992–93)	22–18–5	L
46	January 19, 1993	5–4	@ Edmonton Oilers (1992–93)	23–18–5	W
47	January 21, 1993	4–5	Vancouver Canucks (1992–93)	23–19–5	L
48	January 23, 1993	3–8	New York Rangers (1992–93)	23–20–5	L
49	January 26, 1993	7–1	San Jose Sharks (1992–93)	24–20–5	W
50	January 28, 1993	1–2	Calgary Flames (1992–93)	24–21–5	L
51	January 30, 1993	2–2 OT	Chicago Blackhawks (1992–93)	24–21–6	T

February: 3–8–1 (home: 1–3–1; road: 2–5–0)

Game	Date	Score	Opponent	Record	Recap
52	February 2, 1993	2–3	@ Quebec Nordiques (1992–93)	24–22–6	L
53	February 3, 1993	2–7	@ Montreal Canadiens (1992–93)	24–23–6	L
54	February 9, 1993	3–6	Edmonton Oilers (1992–93)	24–24–6	L
55	February 11, 1993	6–6 OT	Detroit Red Wings (1992–93)	24–24–7	T
56	February 13, 1993	3–10	Washington Capitals (1992–93)	24–25–7	L
57	February 15, 1993	3–0	Vancouver Canucks (1992–93)	25–25–7	W
58	February 17, 1993	10–5	@ Minnesota North Stars (1992–93)	26–25–7	W
59	February 18, 1993	2–7	@ Chicago Blackhawks (1992–93)	26–26–7	L
60	February 20, 1993	3–7	@ Washington Capitals (1992–93)	26–27–7	L
61	February 22, 1993	5–2	@ Tampa Bay Lightning (1992–93)	27–27–7	W
62	February 25, 1993	0–3	@ St. Louis Blues (1992–93)	27–28–7	L
63	February 27, 1993	2–5	Toronto Maple Leafs (1992–93)	27–29–7	L

March: 9–3–2 (home: 6–0–0; road: 3–3–2)

Game	Date	Score	Opponent	Record	Recap
64	March 2, 1993	6–2	Calgary Flames (1992–93)	28–29–7	W
65	March 4, 1993	8–6	Ottawa Senators (1992–93)	29–29–7	W
66	March 6, 1993	6–1	Edmonton Oilers (1992–93)	30–29–7	W
67	March 9, 1993	3–4	@ New York Rangers (1992–93)	30–30–7	L
68	March 11, 1993	3–4 OT	@ Pittsburgh Penguins (1992–93)	30–31–7	L
69	March 15, 1993	4–2	@ Buffalo Sabres (1992–93)	31–31–7	W
70	March 16, 1993	8–4	Winnipeg Jets (1992–93)	32–31–7	W
71	March 18, 1993	7–4	New York Islanders (1992–93)	33–31–7	W
72	March 20, 1993	3–2	St. Louis Blues (1992–93)	34–31–7	W
73	March 24, 1993	2–6	@ Vancouver Canucks (1992–93)	34–32–7	L
74	March 26, 1993	4–1	@ Edmonton Oilers (1992–93)	35–32–7	W
75	March 28, 1993	3–3 OT	@ Winnipeg Jets (1992–93)	35–32–8	T
76	March 29, 1993	9–3	@ Detroit Red Wings (1992–93)	36–32–8	W
77	March 31, 1993	5–5 OT	@ Toronto Maple Leafs (1992–93)	36–32–9	T

April: 3–3–1 (home: 1–2–1; road: 2–1–0)

Game	Date	Score	Opponent	Record	Recap
78	April 1, 1993	3–1	@ Philadelphia Flyers (1992–93)	37–32–9	W
79	April 3, 1993	0–3	Minnesota North Stars (1992–93)	37–33–9	L
80	April 6, 1993	3–3 OT	Calgary Flames (1992–93)	37–33–10	T
81	April 8, 1993	2–1	San Jose Sharks (1992–93)	38–33–10	W
82	April 10, 1993	3–2 OT	@ San Jose Sharks (1992–93)	39–33–10	W
83	April 13, 1993	4–7	@ Vancouver Canucks (1992–93)	39–34–10	L
84	April 15, 1993	6–8	Vancouver Canucks (1992–93)	39–35–10	L

Legend: W Win (2 points) L Loss (0 points) T Tie (1 point)

=== Playoffs ===
1993 Stanley Cup playoffs
Smythe Division Semifinals vs. (S2) Calgary Flames: Kings win 4–2

Game	Date	Score	Opponent	Series	Recap
1	April 18, 1993	6–3	@ Calgary Flames	Kings lead 1–0	W
2	April 21, 1993	4–9	@ Calgary Flames	Series tied 1–1	L
3	April 23, 1993	2–5	Calgary Flames	Flames lead 2–1	L
4	April 25, 1993	3–1	Calgary Flames	Series tied 2–2	W
5	April 27, 1993	9–4	@ Calgary Flames	Kings lead 3–2	W
6	April 29, 1993	9–6	Calgary Flames	Kings win 4–2	W

Smythe Division Finals vs. (S1) Vancouver Canucks: Kings win 4–2

Game	Date	Score	Opponent	Series	Recap
1	May 2, 1993	2–5	@ Vancouver Canucks	Canucks lead 1–0	L
2	May 5, 1993	6–3	@ Vancouver Canucks	Series tied 1–1	W
3	May 7, 1993	7–4	Vancouver Canucks	Kings lead 2–1	W
4	May 9, 1993	2–7	Vancouver Canucks	Series tied 2–2	L
5	May 11, 1993	4–3 2OT	@ Vancouver Canucks	Kings lead 3–2	W
6	May 13, 1993	5–3	Vancouver Canucks	Kings win 4–2	W

Campbell Conference Finals vs. (N3) Toronto Maple Leafs: Kings win 4–3

Game	Date	Score	Opponent	Series	Recap
1	May 17, 1993	1–4	@ Toronto Maple Leafs	Maple Leafs lead 1–0	L
2	May 19, 1993	3–2	@ Toronto Maple Leafs	Series tied 1–1	W
3	May 21, 1993	4–2	Toronto Maple Leafs	Kings lead 2–1	W
4	May 23, 1993	2–4	Toronto Maple Leafs	Series tied 2–2	L
5	May 25, 1993	2–3 OT	@ Toronto Maple Leafs	Maple Leafs lead 3–2	L
6	May 27, 1993	5–4 OT	Toronto Maple Leafs	Series tied 3–3	W
7	May 29, 1993	5–4	@ Toronto Maple Leafs	Kings win 4–3	W

Stanley Cup Finals vs. (A3) Montreal Canadiens: Canadiens win 4–1

Game	Date	Score	Opponent	Series	Recap
1	June 1, 1993	4–1	@ Montreal Canadiens	Kings lead 1–0	W
2	June 3, 1993	2–3 OT	@ Montreal Canadiens	Series tied 1–1	L
3	June 5, 1993	3–4 OT	Montreal Canadiens	Canadiens lead 2–1	L
4	June 7, 1993	2–3 OT	Montreal Canadiens	Canadiens lead 3–1	L
5	June 9, 1993	1–4	@ Montreal Canadiens	Canadiens win 4–1	L

Legend: W Win L Loss

== Player statistics ==
=== Skaters ===
Regular season
Player	GP	G	A	Pts	+/-	PIM
Luc Robitaille	84	63	62	125	18	100
Jari Kurri	82	27	60	87	19	38
Tony Granato	81	37	45	82	-1	171
Mike Donnelly	84	29	40	69	17	45
Wayne Gretzky	45	16	49	65	6	6
Rob Blake	76	16	43	59	18	152
Paul Coffey ‡	50	8	49	57	9	50
Tomas Sandstrom	39	25	27	52	12	57
Alexei Zhitnik	78	12	36	48	-3	80
Marty McSorley	81	15	26	41	1	399
Corey Millen	42	23	16	39	16	42
Darryl Sydor	80	6	23	29	-2	63
Charlie Huddy	82	2	25	27	16	64
Lonnie Loach †	50	10	13	23	3	27
Jimmy Carson †	34	12	10	22	-2	14
Pat Conacher	81	9	8	17	-16	20
Dave Taylor	48	6	9	15	1	49
Warren Rychel	70	6	7	13	-15	314
Jim Hiller ‡	40	6	6	12	0	90
John McIntyre ‡	49	2	5	7	-13	80
Bob Kudelski ‡	15	3	3	6	-3	8
Gary Shuchuk	25	2	4	6	0	16
Robert Lang	11	0	5	5	-3	2
Brent Thompson	30	0	4	4	-4	76
Guy Leveque	12	2	1	3	-4	19
Mark Hardy †	11	0	3	3	-4	4
Peter Ahola ‡	8	1	1	2	-2	6
Tim Watters	22	0	2	2	-3	18
Sean Whyte	18	0	2	2	1	12
Jeff Chychrun †	17	0	1	1	-3	23
Marc Potvin	20	0	1	1	-10	61
Francois Breault	4	0	0	0	-1	6
Rene Chapdelaine	13	0	0	0	-6	12
Marc Fortier †	6	0	0	0	-2	5
Brandy Semchuk	1	0	0	0	0	2
Jim Thomson †	9	0	0	0	-1	56
Darryl Williams	2	0	0	0	0	10
Total		338	586	924	—	2,197

Playoffs
Player	GP	G	A	Pts	+/-	PIM
Wayne Gretzky	24	15	25	40	6	4
Tomas Sandstrom	24	8	17	25	-2	12
Luc Robitaille	24	9	13	22	-13	28
Jari Kurri	24	9	8	17	2	12
Tony Granato	24	6	11	17	3	50
Mike Donnelly	24	6	7	13	3	14
Warren Rychel	23	6	7	13	4	39
Alexei Zhitnik	24	3	9	12	-4	26
Darryl Sydor	24	3	8	11	4	16
Pat Conacher	24	6	4	10	8	6
Rob Blake	23	4	6	10	3	46
Marty McSorley	24	4	6	10	-2	60
Jimmy Carson	18	5	4	9	1	2
Dave Taylor	22	3	5	8	7	31
Corey Millen	23	2	4	6	1	12
Charlie Huddy	23	1	4	5	9	12
Gary Shuchuk	17	2	2	4	-6	12
Mark Hardy	15	1	2	3	7	30
Tim Watters	22	0	2	2	-3	30
Lonnie Loach	1	0	0	0	0	0
Marc Potvin	1	0	0	0	0	0
Jim Thomson	1	0	0	0	0	0
Total		93	144	237	—	442

=== Goaltending ===
Regular season
Player	GP	GS	TOI	W	L	T	GA	GAA	SA	SV%	SO	G	A	PIM
Kelly Hrudey	50	44	2,718:12	18	21	6	175	3.86	1,552	.887	2	0	4	10
Robb Stauber	31	28	1,735:03	15	8	4	111	3.84	987	.888	0	0	2	4
Rick Knickle	10	10	532:18	6	4	0	35	3.95	292	.880	0	0	0	2
David Goverde	2	2	98:17	0	2	0	13	7.94	51	.745	0	0	0	0
Total			5,083:50	39	35	10	334	3.94	2,882	.884	2	0	6	16

Playoffs
Player	GP	GS	TOI	W	L	GA	GAA	SA	SV%	SO	G	A	PIM
Kelly Hrudey	20	20	1,260:42	10	10	74	3.52	656	.887	0	0	0	2
Robb Stauber	4	4	240:00	3	1	16	4.00	157	.898	0	0	0	0
Total			1,500:42	13	11	90	3.60	813	.889	0	0	0	2

† Denotes player spent time with another team before joining the Kings. Stats reflect time with the Kings only.
‡ Denotes player was traded mid-season. Stats reflect time with the Kings only.

Note:

Pos = Position;GP = Games played; G = Goals; A = Assists; Pts = Points; PIM = Penalty minutes; +/- = Plus/minus; PPG = Power-play goals; SHG = Short-handed goals; GWG = Game-winning goals
Pos = Position;GP = Games played; Min, TOI = Minutes played; W = Wins; L = Losses; T,T/OT = Ties; OTL = Overtime losses; GA = Goals-against; GAA = Goals-against average; SO = Shutouts; SA = Shots against; SV = Shots saved;SV% = Save percentage;

== Awards and records ==
- Clarence S. Campbell Bowl
- Luc Robitaille, Left Wing, NHL First Team All-Star
- Luc Robitaille, Most Goals by a Left Wing in One Season (63)

== Transactions ==
The Kings were involved in the following transactions during the 1992–93 season.

=== Trades ===
September 3, 1992	To Los Angeles Kings Pat Conacher	To New Jersey Devils Future considerations
October 13, 1992	To Los Angeles Kings John Mokosak	To New York Rangers Future considerations
November 6, 1992	To Los Angeles Kings Jeff Chychrun	To Pittsburgh Penguins Peter Ahola
December 19, 1992	To Los Angeles Kings Marc Fortier; Jim Thomson	To Ottawa Senators Bob Kudelski; Shawn McCosh
January 29, 1993	To Los Angeles Kings Jimmy Carson; Marc Potvin; Gary Shuchuk	To Detroit Red Wings Paul Coffey; Sylvain Couturier; Jim Hiller
March 22, 1993	To Los Angeles Kings Mark Hardy; 5th round pick in 1993 - Frederick Beaubien	To New York Rangers John McIntyre

=== Free agent signings ===
August 1, 1992	From Hartford Whalers Ed Kastelic
October 1, 1992	From Minnesota North Stars Warren Rychel
February 16, 1993	From San Diego Gulls (IHL) Rick Knickle

=== Free agents lost ===
June 16, 1992	To Washington Capitals Steve Weeks
July 21, 1992	To Tampa Bay Lightning Chris Kontos
July 30, 1992	To Winnipeg Jets Rick Hayward

=== Waivers ===
October 21, 1992	From Ottawa Senators Lonnie Loach

=== Lost in expansion draft ===
June 18, 1992	To Ottawa Senators Jim Thomson
June 18, 1992	To Tampa Bay Lightning John Van Kessel

== Draft picks ==
Los Angeles' draft picks at the 1992 NHL entry draft held at the Montreal Forum in Montreal, Quebec.

Round	#	Player	Position	Nationality	College/Junior/Club team (League)
2	39	Justin Hocking	D	Canada	Spokane Chiefs (WHL)
3	63	Sandy Allan	G	Canada	North Bay Centennials (OHL)
4	87	Kevin Brown	RW	Canada	Belleville Bulls (OHL)
5	111	Jeff Shevalier	LW	Canada	North Bay Centennials (OHL)
6	135	Rem Murray	RW	Canada	Michigan State University (CCHA)
9	207	Magnus Wernblom	RW	Sweden	Modo Hockey (Elitserien)
10	231	Ryan Pisiak	RW	Canada	Prince Albert Raiders (WHL)
11	255	Jukka Tiilikainen	LW	Finland	Kiekko-Espoo (Finland)

Notes

- The Kings first-round pick went to the Philadelphia Flyers as the result of a trade on February 19, 1992 that sent Kjell Samuelson, Rick Tocchet, Ken Wregget and a conditional third-round pick in 1993 to Pittsburgh in exchange for Mark Recchi, Brian Benning and this pick (15th overall).

Pittsburgh previously acquired this pick as the result of a trade on February 19, 1992 that sent Paul Coffey to Los Angeles in exchange for Jeff Chychrun, Brian Benning and this pick.

- The Kings seventh-round pick went to the New York Islanders as the result of a trade on February 18, 1992 that sent Steve Weeks to Los Angeles in exchange for this pick (159th overall).
- The Kings eighth-round pick went to the Detroit Red Wings as the result of a trade on August 15, 1990 that sent Shawn McCosh to Los Angeles in exchange for this pick (183rd overall).
