= 1992–93 NHL transactions =

This list is for 1992–93 NHL transactions within professional ice hockey league of players in North America. The following contains team-to-team transactions that occurred in the National Hockey League during the 1992–93 NHL season. It lists what team each player has been traded to, or claimed by, and for which players or draft picks, if applicable.

== June ==
June 2, 1992	To Toronto Maple Leafs cash	To Calgary Flames Todd Gillingham
June 5, 1992	To Toronto Maple Leafs Brad Marsh	To Detroit Red Wings cash
June 10, 1992	To Boston Bruins Doug Evans	To Winnipeg Jets Daniel Berthiaume
June 13, 1992	To New Jersey Devils Brad Shaw	To Hartford Whalers cash
June 15, 1992	To Hartford Whalers Nick Kypreos	To Washington Capitals Mark Hunter future considerations (Yvon Corriveau)^{1}
June 15, 1992	To Hartford Whalers Allen Pedersen	To Minnesota North Stars conditional draft pick – 1993 entry draft (6th-rd - # 136 – Rick Mrozik)^{2}
June 15, 1992	To Toronto Maple Leafs Jarmo Myllys	To San Jose Sharks cash
June 15, 1992	To Buffalo Sabres Stephane Beauregard	To Winnipeg Jets Christian Ruuttu future considerations
June 15, 1992	To Quebec Nordiques Doug Crossman; Dennis Vial	To Detroit Red Wings cash
June 19, 1992	To Montreal Canadiens Frederic Chabot	To Tampa Bay Lightning Jean-Claude Bergeron
June 19, 1992	To Quebec Nordiques Tim Hunter	To Tampa Bay Lightning future considerations (Martin Simard)^{3}
June 19, 1992	To St. Louis Blues 4th-rd pick – 1994 entry draft (TBL - # 86 – Dmitri Klevakin)^{4} 5th-rd pick – 1995 entry draft (TBL - # 108 – Konstantin Golokhvasto)^{5} 6th-rd pick – 1996 entry draft (TBL - # 152 – Nikolai Ignatov)^{6}	To Tampa Bay Lightning Pat Jablonski; Darin Kimble; Rob Robinson; Steve Tuttle
June 19, 1992	To Tampa Bay Lightning Danton Cole	To Winnipeg Jets future considerations
June 20, 1992	To New York Rangers future considerations	To Ottawa Senators 11th-rd pick – 1992 entry draft (# 264 – Petter Ronnquist)
June 20, 1992	To Detroit Red Wings Dino Ciccarelli	To Washington Capitals Kevin Miller
June 20, 1992	To Edmonton Oilers 4th-rd pick – 1992 entry draft (# 8 – Brandon Convery); 8th-rd pick – 1992 entry draft (# 190 – Colin Schmidt)	To New York Rangers 4th-rd pick – 1992 entry draft (# 85 – Chris Ferraro)
June 20, 1992	To Toronto Maple Leafs 1st-rd pick – 1992 entry draft (# 96 – Ralph Intranuovo); 2nd-rd pick – 1992 entry draft (WAS - # 32 – Jim Carey)^{7}	To New York Islanders 1st-rd pick – 1992 entry draft (# 5 – Darius Kasparaitis)
June 20, 1992	To Toronto Maple Leafs 1st-rd pick – 1992 entry draft (# 23 – Grant Marshall); 4th-rd pick – 1992 entry draft (# 95 – Mark Raiter)	To Washington Capitals 2nd-rd pick – 1992 entry draft (# 32 – Jim Carey); 3rd-rd pick – 1992 entry draft (# 53 – Stefan Ustorf); 4th-rd pick – 1993 entry draft (DET - # 97 – John Jakopin)^{8}
June 20, 1992	To Chicago Blackhawks 1st-rd pick – 1992 entry draft (# 12 – Sergei Krivokrasov); 2nd-rd pick – 1992 entry draft (# 36 – Jeff Shantz)	To Winnipeg Jets 1st-rd pick – 1992 entry draft (# 17 – Sergei Bautin); 2nd-rd pick – 1992 entry draft (# 27 – Boris Mironov)
June 20, 1992	To St. Louis Blues 11th-rd pick – 1993 entry draft (# 275 – Christer Olsson)	To Winnipeg Jets 11th-rd pick – 1992 entry draft (# 254 – Ivan Vologjaninov)
June 22, 1992	To Calgary Flames Chris Lindberg	To Ottawa Senators Mark Osiecki
June 30, 1992	To Quebec Nordiques Steve Duchesne; Peter Forsberg; Ron Hextall; Kerry Huffman; Mike Ricci; 1st-rd pick – 1993 entry draft (# 10 – Jocelyn Thibault) $15 million cash future considerations (Chris Simon)^{9} (1st-rd pick – 1994 entry draft (WAS - # 10 – Nolan Baumgartner)^{10}	To Philadelphia Flyers Eric Lindros

1. Trade completed on August 20, 1992.
2. Conditions of this draft pick are unknown.
3. Trade completed on September 14, 1992.
4. Tampa Bay's fourth-round pick was re-acquired as the result of a trade on January 28, 1993, that sent Basil McRae, Doug Crossman and a fourth-round pick in the 1996 entry draft to St. Louis in exchange for Jason Ruff, Tampa Bay's fifth-round pick in 1995 entry draft, sixth-round pick in 1996 entry draft and this pick.
5. Tampa Bay's fifth-round pick was re-acquired as the result of a trade on March 21, 1994, that sent Joe Reekie to Washington in exchange for Enrico Ciccone and a conditional fifth round pick (this pick). Conditions of this draft pick are unknown.
  Tampa Bay's fifth-round pick went to Washington as the result of a trade on October 22, 1993 that sent Pat Elynuik to Tampa Bay in exchange for a conditional fifth round pick (this pick). Conditions of this draft pick are unknown.
  Tampa Bay's fourth-round pick was re-acquired as the result of a trade on January 28, 1993, that sent Basil McRae, Doug Crossman and a fourth-round pick in the 1996 entry draft to St. Louis in exchange for Jason Ruff, Tampa Bay's fourth-round pick in 1994 entry draft, sixth-round pick in 1996 entry draft and this pick.
6. Tampa Bay's sixth-round pick was re-acquired as the result of a trade on January 28, 1993, that sent Basil McRae, Doug Crossman and a fourth-round pick in the 1996 entry draft to St. Louis in exchange for Jason Ruff, Tampa Bay's fourth-round pick in 1994 entry draft, fifth-round pick in 1995 entry draft and this pick.
7. Toronto's second-round pick went to Washington as the result of a trade on June 20, 1992 that sent Washington's first and fourth-round picks in 1992 entry draft to Toronto in exchange for Toronto's third-round pick in 1992 entry draft, a fourth-round pick in 1993 entry draft and this pick.
8. Winnipeg's fourth-round pick went to Detroit as the result of a trade on June 11, 1993 that sent Paul Ysebaert and future considerations (Alan Kerr) to Winnipeg in exchange for Aaron Ward and this pick.
  Washington's fourth-round pick went to Winnipeg as the result of a trade on October 1, 1992 that sent Pat Elynuik to Washington in exchange for John Druce and this pick.
9. Trade completed on July 21, 1992.
10. Toronto's first-round pick went to Washington as the result of a trade on June 28, 1994 that sent Mike Ridley and a first-round pick in 1994 entry draft to Toronto in exchange for Rob Pearson and this pick.
  Quebec's first-round pick went to Toronto as the result of a trade on June 28, 1994 that sent Wendel Clark, Sylvain Lefebvre, Landon Wilson and a first-round pick in 1994 entry draft to Quebec in exchange for Garth Butcher, Mats Sundin, Todd Warriner and this pick.

== July ==
July 9, 1992	To Hartford Whalers Tim Kerr	To New York Rangers future considerations (7th-rd pick – 1993 entry draft # 162 – Sergei Kondrashkin)^{1}
July 16, 1992	To Minnesota North Stars Mario Thyer	To New York Jets future considerations
July 20, 1992	To Toronto Maple Leafs future considerations	To Ottawa Senators Brad Marsh
July 21, 1992	To Toronto Maple Leafs Ken McRae	To Quebec Nordiques Len Esau
July 28, 1992	To New York Rangers future considerations	To Ottawa Senators Jody Hull

1. Trade completed on June 26, 1993.

== August ==
August 4, 1992	To Minnesota North Stars Collin Bauer	To Edmonton Oilers future considerations
August 7, 1992	To Buffalo Sabres Dominik Hašek	To Chicago Blackhawks Stephane Beauregard; 4th-rd pick – 1993 entry draft (# 90 – Eric Daze)
August 10, 1992	To Chicago Blackhawks Christian Ruuttu	To Winnipeg Jets Stephane Beauregard
August 13, 1992	To Washington Capitals future considerations	To Ottawa Senators Steve Weeks
August 14, 1992	To Montreal Canadiens 5th-rd pick – 1993 entry draft (# 113 – Jeff Lank)	To Minnesota North Stars Mike McPhee
August 20, 1992	To Toronto Maple Leafs Sylvain Lefebvre	To Montreal Canadiens 3rd-rd pick – 1994 entry draft (# 74 – Martin Belanger)
August 24, 1992	To San Jose Sharks rights to Markus Thuresson	To New York Islanders Brian Mullen
August 24, 1992	To Quebec Nordiques Shawn Cronin	To Winnipeg Jets Dan Lambert
August 27, 1992	To Montreal Canadiens Vincent Damphousse; 4th-rd pick – 1993 entry draft (# 85 – Adam Wiesel)	To Edmonton Oilers Shayne Corson; Brent Gilchrist; Vladimir Vujtek
August 28, 1992	To New Jersey Devils Bobby Holik; 2nd-rd pick – 1993 entry draft (# 32 – Jay Pandolfo) future considerations	To Hartford Whalers Sean Burke; Eric Weinrich
August 28, 1992	To San Jose Sharks Hubie McDonough	To New York Islanders cash
August 31, 1992	To Montreal Canadiens Brian Bellows	To Minnesota North Stars Russ Courtnall

== September ==
September 2, 1992	To Hartford Whalers Mark Janssens	To Minnesota North Stars James Black
September 2, 1992	To Boston Bruins David Shaw	To Minnesota North Stars future considerations
September 3, 1992	To New Jersey Devils future considerations	To Ottawa Senators Neil Brady
September 3, 1992	To New Jersey Devils future considerations	To Los Angeles Kings Pat Conacher
September 4, 1992	To Boston Bruins Darin Kimble future considerations	To Tampa Bay Lightning Matt Hervey; Ken Hodge Jr.
September 9, 1992	To Quebec Nordiques cash	To Detroit Red Wings Dennis Vial
September 25, 1992	To Edmonton Oilers Jeff Bloemberg	To Tampa Bay Lightning future considerations

== October ==
October 1, 1992	To Hartford Whalers Corrie D'Alessio conditional pick – 1993 entry draft^{1} (5th-rd - VAN - # 124 – Scott Walker)^{2}	To Vancouver Canucks Kay Whitmore
October 1, 1992	To Philadelphia Flyers Brent Fedyk	To Detroit Red Wings 4th-rd pick – 1993 entry draft (BOS - # 88 – Charles Paquette)^{3}
October 1, 1992	To Washington Capitals Pat Elynuik	To Winnipeg Jets John Druce; 4th-rd pick – 1993 entry draft (DET - # 97 – John Jakopin)^{4}
October 1, 1992	To Winnipeg Jets 3rd-rd pick – 1993 entry draft (PIT - # 62 – Dave Roche)^{5} 5th-rd pick – 1994 entry draft (DET - # 114 – Frederic Deschenes)^{6}	To Philadelphia Flyers Stephane Beauregard
October 5, 1992	To Tampa Bay Lightning future considerations^{7}	To New York Islanders 5th-rd pick – 1994 entry draft (# 112 – Mark McArthur)
October 5, 1992	To Montreal Canadiens future considerations	To Calgary Flames Patrick Lebeau
October 9, 1992	To Hartford Whalers future considerations (Yvon Corriveau)^{8}	To San Jose Sharks Michel Picard
October 13, 1992	To Los Angeles Kings John Mokosak	To New York Rangers future considerations
October 27, 1992	To Quebec Nordiques Bryan Deasley	To Calgary Flames future considerations
October 28, 1992	To Boston Bruins Stephane Richer	To Tampa Bay Lightning Bob Beers

1. Conditions of this draft pick are unknown.
2. Vancouver's fifth-round pick was re-acquired as the result of a trade on March 22, 1993, that sent that sent Robert Kron, future considerations (Jim Sandlak on May 17, 1993) and a third-round pick in the 1993 entry draft to Hartford in exchange for Murray Craven and this pick.
3. Philadelphia's fourth-round pick was re-acquired as the result of a trade on June 20, 1993 that sent Greg Johnson and Philadelphia's fifth-round pick in 1994 entry draft to Detroit in exchange for Jim Cummings and this pick.
  Philadelphia's fourth-round pick went to Boston to complete a trade on January 2, 1992 that sent Garry Galley, Wes Walz and a third-round pick in the 1993 entry draft to Philadelphia in exchange for Gord Murphy, Brian Dobbin, a third-round pick in the 1992 entry draft and future considerations (this pick). The trade was completed on June 26, 1993.
4. Winnipeg's fourth-round pick went to Detroit as the result of a trade on June 11, 1993 that sent Paul Ysebaert and future considerations (Alan Kerr) to Winnipeg in exchange for Aaron Ward and this pick.
5. Philadelphia's fourth-round pick was re-acquired as the result of a trade on June 11, 1993 that sent Stephane Beauregard to Winnipeg in exchange for a fifth-round pick in the 1994 entry draft and this pick.
  Philadelphia's third-round pick went to Pittsburgh to complete a trade on February 19, 1992 that sent Brian Benning, Mark Recchi and a first-round pick in the 1992 entry draft to Philadelphia in exchange for Kjell Samuelsson, Rick Tocchet, Ken Wregget and a conditional third-round pick in the 1993 entry draft (this pick). Conditions of this draft pick are unknown and the trade was completed on June 26, 1993.
6. The Islanders agreed to leave Adam Creighton unprotected in the 1992 NHL Waiver Draft.
7. The trade was completed on January 21, 1993.

== November ==
November 1, 1992	To St. Louis Blues Kevin Miller	To Washington Capitals Paul Cavallini
November 3, 1992	To Vancouver Canucks Anatoli Semenov	To Tampa Bay Lightning Dave Capuano; 4th-rd pick – 1994 entry draft (CGY - # 91 – Ryan Duthie)^{1}
November 5, 1992	To New York Rangers 5th-rd pick – 1993 entry draft (LAK - # 105 – Frederick Beaubien)^{2}	To Ottawa Senators Dave Archibald
November 6, 1992	To Los Angeles Kings Jeff Chychrun	To Pittsburgh Penguins Peter Ahola
November 24, 1992	To Toronto Maple Leafs John Cullen	To Hartford Whalers 2nd-rd pick – 1993 entry draft (SJS - # 45 – Vlastimil Kroupa)^{3}

1. The fourth-round pick went to Calgary as the result of a trade with New Jersey on June 29 that sent a third-round pick in the 1994 entry draft to New Jersey in exchange for a third and fifth round picks in the 1994 entry draft and this pick. New Jersey previously acquired this pick as the result of a trade with Tampa Bay on May 31, 1994, that sent Jeff Toms to Tampa Bay in exchange for this pick.
2. The fifth-round pick went to Los Angeles as the result of a trade with the Rangers on March 22, 1993, that sent John McIntyre to the Rangers in exchange for this pick.
3. The second-round pick went to San Jose as the result of a trade with Hartford on June 26, 1993, that sent the second overall pick in the 1993 entry draft to Hartford in exchange for Sergei Makarov, a first and third-round picks in the 1993 entry draft and this pick.

== December ==
December 8, 1992	To Tampa Bay Lightning Steve Kasper	To Philadelphia Flyers Dan Vincelette
December 11, 1992	To Edmonton Oilers Roman Oksiuta; 3rd-rd pick – 1993 entry draft (# 60 – Alexander Kerch)	To New York Rangers Kevin Lowe
December 15, 1992	To San Jose Sharks Robin Bawa	To Vancouver Canucks Rick Lessard
December 16, 1992	To Calgary Flames Ken Sabourin	To Washington Capitals future considerations
December 18, 1992	To San Jose Sharks Mark Pederson future considerations	To Philadelphia Flyers Dave Snuggerud
December 19, 1992	To Los Angeles Kings Marc Fortier; Jim Thomson	To Ottawa Senators Bob Kudelski; Shawn McCosh
December 28, 1992	To Winnipeg Jets Tie Domi; Kris King	To New York Rangers Ed Olczyk

== January ==
January 13, 1993	To New Jersey Devils Bernie Nicholls	To Edmonton Oilers Zdeno Ciger; Kevin Todd
January 16, 1993	To Edmonton Oilers Brian Benning	To Philadelphia Flyers Josef Beranek; Greg Hawgood
January 20, 1993	To Quebec Nordiques Paul MacDermid; Ken Sabourin	To Washington Capitals Mike Hough
January 22, 1993	To New Jersey Devils Brian Lawton	To San Jose Sharks future considerations
January 28, 1993	To St. Louis Blues Doug Crossman; Basil McRae; 4th-rd pick – 1996 entry draft (# 97 – Andrei Petrakov)	To Tampa Bay Lightning Jason Ruff; 4th-rd pick – 1994 entry draft (# 86 – Dmitri Klevakin); 5th-rd pick – 1995 entry draft (# 108 – Konstantin Golokhvasto); 6th-rd pick – 1996 entry draft (# 152 – Nikolai Ignatov)
January 28, 1993	To Montreal Canadiens Gary Leeman	To Calgary Flames Brian Skrudland
January 29, 1993	To Los Angeles Kings Jimmy Carson; Marc Potvin; Gary Shuchuk	To Detroit Red Wings Paul Coffey; Sylvain Couturier; Jim Hiller
January 29, 1993	To Vancouver Canucks Tim Taylor	To Washington Capitals Eric Murano

== February ==
February 1, 1993	To Boston Bruins C.J. Young	To Calgary Flames Brent Ashton
February 2, 1993	To Toronto Maple Leafs Dave Andreychuk; Daren Puppa; 1st-rd pick – 1993 entry draft (# 12 – Kenny Jonsson)	To Buffalo Sabres Grant Fuhr; 5th-rd pick – 1995 entry draft (# 119 – Kevin Popp)
February 2, 1993	To Detroit Red Wings future considerations	To Philadelphia Flyers Bob Wilkie
February 12, 1993	To Quebec Nordiques Michel Mongeau; Martin Simard; Steve Tuttle	To Tampa Bay Lightning Herb Raglan
February 21, 1993	To Chicago Blackhawks Troy Murray	To Winnipeg Jets Steve Bancroft; 11th-rd pick – 1993 entry draft (# 285 – Russ Hewson)
February 22, 1993	To Winnipeg Jets future considerations	To New York Islanders Rick Hayward
February 24, 1993	To Edmonton Oilers Igor Kravchuk; Dean McAmmond	To Chicago Blackhawks Joe Murphy
February 25, 1993	To Toronto Maple Leafs Brad Miller	To Ottawa Senators 9th-rd pick – 1993 entry draft (# 227 – Pavol Demitra)
February 26, 1993	To San Jose Sharks Peter Ahola	To Pittsburgh Penguins future considerations

== March ==
- Trading Deadline: March 22, 1993

March 4, 1993	To Winnipeg Jets 4th-rd pick – 1993 entry draft (# 79 – Ruslan Batyrshin)	To Ottawa Senators rights to Dmitri Filimonov
March 5, 1993	To Minnesota North Stars Brent Gilchrist	To Edmonton Oilers Todd Elik
March 17, 1993	To Edmonton Oilers Doug Weight	To New York Rangers Esa Tikkanen
March 18, 1993	To Boston Bruins Daniel Marois	To New York Islanders conditional draft pick - 1994 entry draft^{1} (# 8th-rd pick – # 203 – Peter Hogardh)
March 18, 1993	To Calgary Flames Greg Paslawski	To Philadelphia Flyers 9th-rd pick – 1993 entry draft (# 226 – E.J. Bradley)
March 20, 1993	To Minnesota North Stars Mark Osiecki; 10th-rd pick – 1993 entry draft (# 249 – Bill Lang)	To Winnipeg Jets 9th-rd pick – 1993 entry draft (# 217 – Vladimir Potapov)
March 20, 1993	To Montreal Canadiens Rob Ramage	To Tampa Bay Lightning Eric Charron; Alain Cote future considerations (Donald Dufresne)^{2}
March 22, 1993	To Hartford Whalers Robert Kron; 3rd-rd pick – 1993 entry draft (# 72 – Marek Malik) future considerations (Jim Sandlak)^{3}	To Vancouver Canucks Murray Craven; 5th-rd pick – 1993 entry draft (# 124 – Scott Walker)
March 22, 1993	To Hartford Whalers 6th-rd pick – 1993 entry draft (DET - # 152 – Tim Spitzig)^{4}	To Detroit Red Wings Steve Konroyd
March 22, 1993	To Buffalo Sabres Bob Errey	To Pittsburgh Penguins Mike Ramsey
March 22, 1993	To Los Angeles Kings Mark Hardy; 5th-rd pick – 1993 entry draft (# 105 – Frederick Beaubien)	To New York Rangers John McIntyre
March 22, 1993	To Tampa Bay Lightning Randy Gilhen	To New York Rangers Mike Hartman
March 22, 1993	To Tampa Bay Lightning 3rd-rd pick – 1993 entry draft (FLA - # 78 – Steve Washburn)^{5}	To Pittsburgh Penguins Peter Taglianetti
March 22, 1993	To Edmonton Oilers Mike Hudson	To Chicago Blackhawks Craig Muni
March 22, 1993	To Vancouver Canucks Dan Ratushny	To Winnipeg Jets 9th-rd pick – 1993 entry draft (# 228 – Harijs Vitolinsh)
March 22, 1993	To Washington Capitals Rick Tabaracci	To Winnipeg Jets Jim Hrivnak; 2nd-rd pick – 1993 entry draft (# 43 – Alexei Budayev)

1. Conditions of this draft pick are unknown.
2. Trade completed on June 18, 1993.
3. Trade completed on May 17, 1993.
4. Detroit's sixth-round pick was re-acquired as the result of a trade on June 1, 1993 that sent Brad McCrimmon to Hartford in exchange for this pick.
5. Tampa Bay's third-round pick went to Florida as the result of a trade on June 26, 1993 that ensured that Florida selected Darren Puppa in the 1993 NHL expansion draft from Toronto to Tampa Bay in exchange for this pick.

== See also ==
- 1992 NHL entry draft
- 1992 in sports
- 1993 in sports
