= Jim Thomson (ice hockey, born 1965) =

Canadian former ice hockey player (born 1965)

- Born: December 30, 1965 (age 60) Edmonton, Alberta, Canada
- Height: 6 ft 1 in (185 cm)
- Weight: 205 lb (93 kg; 14 st 9 lb)
- Position: Right wing
- Shot: Right
- Played for: Washington Capitals; Hartford Whalers; New Jersey Devils; Los Angeles Kings; Ottawa Senators; Mighty Ducks of Anaheim
- NHL draft: 185th overall, 1984; Washington Capitals
- Playing career: 1985–1994

James B. Thomson (born December 30, 1965) is a Canadian former professional ice hockey player. He was selected by the Washington Capitals of the National Hockey League (NHL) in the 1984 NHL entry draft. Thomson also played for the Hartford Whalers, New Jersey Devils, Los Angeles Kings, Ottawa Senators and Mighty Ducks of Anaheim in a nine year career spanning from 1985 to 1994.

== Career ==
=== Junior ===
Thomson split one season between the Markham Waxers of the Ontario Junior Hockey League and the Toronto Marlboros of the Ontario Hockey League (OHL) for the 1982–83 season. He played in 35 games for Markham, registering six goals and 13 points. Thomson played in 14 games with Toronto, going scoreless and was released by the Marlboros on October 30, 1982. He returned to Toronto as an injury recall in March but did not play. He added his first point as a Marlboro while playing in four games in the 1983 OHL playoffs. He returned to the Marlboros the following season and played in 60 games, scoring 10 goals and 28 points. During the season, Thomson suffered a pulled groin and hip muscle and missed time with the injury. He added one goal in nine playoff games during the 1984 OHL playoffs. His final season in the OHL came in 1984–85 when he registered 23 goals and 51 points in 63 games. He added three goals in five games in the 1985 OHL playoffs.

=== Professional ===
==== Washington Capitals, Hartford Whalers, and New Jersey Devils ====
Thomson was selected in the ninth round, 185th overall, by the Washington Capitals of the National Hockey League (NHL) in the 1984 NHL entry draft. He joined Washington's American Hockey League (AHL) affiliate, the Binghamton Whalers, at the end of the 1984–85 season, once his OHL career had ended. Described as a "scrappy right winger who likes to play physical", Thomson went scoreless in four regular season games while playing on the fourth line. The Whalers made the 1985 Calder Cup playoffs, and in six games he registered one point (an assist). In his first full season with Binghamton in 1985–86, Thomson scored 15 goals and 24 points in 59 games and added 195 penalty minutes (PIM). He was one of only two rookies to play regularly for the Whalers to start the season. He missed some games in January 1986 due to a hand injury, and in February, suffered a dislocated shoulder in a fight against Dean Defazio. Thomson added one goal and two points in six games during the 1986 Calder Cup playoffs.

In his second season with Binghamton in 1986–87, Thomson scored 13 goals and 23 points in 57 games and registered 360 PIM. He led the AHL in penalty minutes that season. On October 13, in a match with the Rochester Americans in Rochester, New York, Whalers' teammate Shane Churla became the target of Rochester fans after being ejected from the game for a knee to the groin of Andy Ristau during a fight. While leaving the ice, Churla became embroiled with Rochester fans, which caused other members of the Whalers, Ed Kastelic, Thomson, and head coach Larry Pleau, to join in the fracas with the fans in the stands. On October 19, Thomson received an automatic three-game suspension for pushing a linesman during their next match against the Americans. Thomson was recalled by Washington on November 21 after injuries to forwards Gaétan Duchesne and Dave Christian. He made his NHL debut on November 22 in a 5–4 loss to the Pittsburgh Penguins. He was returned to Binghamton on December 12 having played in nine games with the Capitals, going scoreless. He was recalled again by Washington in late December after a series of injuries depleted their forward depth. He played in a single game against the Hartford Whalers on December 30 before being sent back to Binghamton on January 3, 1987. He played in ten games total with the Capitals that season, going scoreless. Binghamton made the Calder Cup playoffs again that season and Thomson appeared in ten games, registering one assist and 40 PIM.

Thomson spent the entire 1987–88 season in the AHL with Binghamton, scoring 8 goals and 17 points in 25 games. He missed time during the season beginning in December after undergoing surgery on his hand to repair two knuckles damaged while fighting. He also appeared in four Calder Cup playoff games, scoring one goal and three points. During the 1988–89 season, Thomson split the season between Washington and their new AHL affiliate, the Baltimore Skipjacks. Thomson registered his first NHL goal and point in a 7–4 loss to the Chicago Blackhawks on February 15, 1989. He scored the second goal of the game, assisted by Scott Stevens and Mike Ridley on Blackhawks goaltender Alain Chevrier, chasing Chevrier from the game to be replaced by Ed Belfour. He scored 25 goals and 41 points in 41 games for the Skipjacks and appeared 14 games with the Capitals, scoring two goals. On March 6 Thomson was traded by the Capitals to the Hartford Whalers for defenceman Scot Kleinendorst. Thomson made his Whalers debut on March 18 in an 8–2 loss against his former team, the Capitals. He played in five games for the Whalers, going scoreless. In the offseason, Thomson signed a multi-year contract with Hartford in August.

Thomson began the 1989–90 season back in the AHL with Hartford's affiliate, the Binghamton Whalers. He played eight games with Binghamton, scoring one goal and three points before being traded to the New Jersey Devils on October 31, 1989 for minor league forward Chris Cichocki. He was immediately assigned to New Jersey's AHL affiliate, the Utica Devils. Thomson appeared in 60 games with Utica registering 20 goals and 43 points. Utica made the 1990 Calder Cup playoffs and Thomson appeared in four games, scoring just one goal. New Jersey recalled Thomson from Utica in early February 1990, and he made his NHL Devils' debut on February 9 in a 5–3 victory over his former team, the Washington Capitals. He appeared in two more games with New Jersey, going scoreless.

==== Los Angeles Kings and expansion ====
During the 1990 offseason, Thomson signed with the Los Angeles Kings as a free agent in July. He was assigned to Los Angeles' AHL affiliate, the New Haven Nighthawks, to start the 1990–91 season. In 27 games with the Nighthawks, Thomson scored 5 goals and 18 points. He was recalled by Los Angeles in early January 1991 and made his Kings debut on January 5 against the Toronto Maple Leafs. Playing on a line with Jay Miller and Sylvain Couturier, the Kings won 5–2. In the following game on January 6, Thomson registered his first goal and point in a Kings jersey, scoring on Ed Belfour in a 3–1 victory over the Chicago Blackhawks. He played in eight games for the Kings that season, scoring just the one goal. During the offseason, Thomson was made available in the 1991 NHL expansion draft and was selected by the Minnesota North Stars with the 18th selection. At the 1991 NHL entry draft, Thomson was traded back to the Kings along with defenceman Charlie Huddy, forward Randy Gilhen, and a fourth round pick in the draft in exchange for forward Todd Elik. All three of Thomson, Huddy and Gilhen had been selected by Minnesota in the expansion draft. Thomson spent the majority of the 1991–92 season with the Kings, playing in 45 games, scoring one goal and three points. He played on a line with Jay Miller and Randy Gilhen. In an 8–2 loss to the Vancouver Canucks on November 12, Thomson suffered a hyperextended right elbow. He returned to the lineup on November 26 after missing four games. On December 23, the Kings traded Gilhen away and replaced him with John McIntyre at center on Thomson's line. Thomson suffered a heel injury in February 1992 that caused him to miss time and after recovering, was assigned to Los Angeles' International Hockey League (IHL) affiliate Phoenix Roadrunners on February 28. He played in two games with Phoenix, scoring a goal.

Thomson was made available in the 1992 NHL expansion draft. He was selected by the Ottawa Senators. At this point in his career, he was a slow skating enforcer who was redundant to Mike Peluso. He made his Senators debut on October 12 in a 6–3 loss to the Boston Bruins. Thomson played as part of Ottawa's checking unit, playing on a line with Laurie Boschman and Darcy Loewen. He registered his only point with the Senators assisting on Loewen's first NHL goal on October 27 against the Pittsburgh Penguins. On December 19, 1992 Thomson was traded back to the Los Angeles Kings along with forward Marc Fortier for forward Bob Kudelksi and prospect centre Shawn McCosh. He was assigned to Phoenix of the IHL on February 16, 1993 and recalled on April 15. The Kings made the 1993 Stanley Cup playoffs and faced the Toronto Maple Leafs in the Clarence Campbell Conference Final. Coach Barry Melrose grew upset with centre Jimmy Carson's play and scratched him from the lineup. Melrose chose to replace Carson in the lineup with Thomson and on May 25, Thomson played in his first NHL playoff game, taking one shift and spending the rest of the game on the bench. The next game, he was scratched for defenceman Mark Hardy. The Kings ultimately lost to the Montreal Canadiens in the Stanley Cup final.

In the offseason the Kings left Thomson exposed in the 1993 NHL expansion draft. He was selected by the Mighty Ducks of Anaheim. He made his Mighty Ducks debut on October 10, 1993 against the New York Islanders. He sprained his left shoulder in the first period and missed the rest of the game. He was listed as day-to-day on the injured list for the Ducks. He appeared in six games with the Mighty Ducks during the 1993–94 season. Having not played since December 2, Thomson underwent surgery on his left shoulder in late December, sidelining him indefinitely. In total, Thomson played 115 regular NHL season games, scoring four goals and three assists for seven points and collecting 416 penalty minutes.

== Personal life ==
After retiring from the NHL, Thomson became the owner of a Junior "A" hockey team, the Aurora Tigers. He is also a motivational speaker often invited to speak at schools across North America as part of his organization called Jim Thomson's "Dreams Do Come True". Thomson is also an ambassador, speaker and advisory board member for Your Life Counts.

== Career statistics ==
			Regular season					Playoffs
Season	Team	League	GP	G	A	Pts	PIM	GP	G	A	Pts	PIM
1980–81	Markham Waxers	OPJHL	3	0	1	1	0	—	—	—	—	—
1981–82	Devon Dynamiters	AAHA	55	60	56	116	72	—	—	—	—	—
1982–83	Markham Waxers	OJHL	35	6	7	13	81	—	—	—	—	—
1982–83	Toronto Marlboros	OHL	14	0	0	0	9	4	0	1	1	0
1983–84	Toronto Marlboros	OHL	60	10	18	28	68	9	1	0	1	26
1984–85	Toronto Marlboros	OHL	63	23	28	51	122	5	3	1	4	25
1984–85	Binghamton Whalers	AHL	4	0	0	0	2	—	—	—	—	—
1985–85	Binghamton Whalers	AHL	59	15	9	24	195	—	—	—	—	—
1986–87	Washington Capitals	NHL	10	0	0	0	35	—	—	—	—	—
1986–87	Binghamton Whalers	AHL	57	13	10	23	360	10	0	1	1	40
1987–88	Binghamton Whalers	AHL	25	8	9	17	64	4	1	2	3	7
1988–89	Washington Capitals	NHL	14	2	0	2	53	—	—	—	—	—
1988–89	Hartford Whalers	NHL	5	0	0	0	14	—	—	—	—	—
1988–89	Baltimore Skipjacks	AHL	41	25	16	41	129	—	—	—	—	—
1989–90	New Jersey Devils	NHL	3	0	0	0	31	—	—	—	—	—
1989–90	Binghamton Whalers	AHL	8	1	2	3	30	—	—	—	—	—
1989–90	Utica Devils	AHL	60	20	23	43	124	4	1	0	1	19
1990–91	New Jersey Devils	NHL	8	1	0	1	19	—	—	—	—	—
1990–91	New Haven Nighthawks	AHL	27	5	8	13	121	—	—	—	—	—
1991–92	Los Angeles Kings	NHL	45	1	2	3	162	—	—	—	—	—
1991–92	Phoenix Roadrunners	IHL	2	1	0	1	0	—	—	—	—	—
1992–93	Ottawa Senators	NHL	15	0	1	1	41	—	—	—	—	—
1992–93	Los Angeles Kings	NHL	9	0	0	0	56	1	0	0	0	0
1992–93	Phoenix Roadrunners	IHL	14	4	5	9	44	—	—	—	—	—
1993–94	Mighty Ducks of Anaheim	NHL	6	0	0	0	5	—	—	—	—	—
NHL totals			115	4	3	7	416	1	0	0	0	0
