= Bob Kudelski =

American ice hockey player (born 1964)

- Born: March 3, 1964 (age 62) Springfield, Massachusetts, U.S.
- Height: 6 ft 1 in (185 cm)
- Weight: 200 lb (91 kg; 14 st 4 lb)
- Position: Center
- Shot: Right
- Played for: Los Angeles Kings; Ottawa Senators; Florida Panthers
- NHL draft: 1986 NHL Supplemental Draft; Los Angeles Kings
- Playing career: 1987–1996

Robert Richard Kudelski (born March 3, 1964) is an American former professional ice hockey player. He played as a center in the National Hockey League (NHL) for the Los Angeles Kings, Ottawa Senators, and Florida Panthers between 1987 and 1996. He was selected by the Kings in the 1986 NHL Supplemental Draft.

== Early life ==
Kudelski was born in Springfield, Massachusetts, but grew up in Feeding Hills. He was a star recruit for Cathedral High School before playing a year of prep school hockey at The Hill School under coach Tom Eccleston.

== Playing career ==
=== Amateur ===
Kudelski committed to playing college hockey with the Yale Bulldogs of the Eastern College Athletic Conference (ECAC) in May 1983. He joined the team at the beginning in the 1983–84 season as a freshman. However, the team got off to a rough start, improving as the season went on. Kudelski had 14 goals and 12 assists for 26 points in 21 games, leading the team in scoring as the school's top line center. In 1984–85, Yale was not considered one of the contenders, more of a middling team that needed more scoring support for its leading scorers such as Kudelski. Kudelski, once again playing on the top line alongside Bob Logan and Sean Neely, saw an increase in his offensive production, scoring 21 goals and 44 points in 32 games with Yale. As a sophomore, he finished second in scoring on his team. Yale was eliminated in the quarterfinals of the ECAC tournament by Cornell. Kudelski saw a slight decrease in his offense in 1985–86, scoring 18 goals and 41 points in 31 games as a junior. Yale met Cornell in the semifinals of the ECAC tournament, and lost for the second consecutive team. In his final season with the Bulldogs in 1986–87, Kudelski had his best collegiate season, scoring 25 goals and 47 points in 30 games, leading his team in scoring, and was named as a First All-Star in the ECAC. Yale, projected to finish eighth out of twelve teams, finished fourth after getting as high as second in the conference. Facing Clarkson in the opening round of the ECAC tournament, Kudelski became the highest scoring member of the Bulldogs, surpassing Bob Brooke, as Yale moved on to the semifinals. However, Yale failed to score in its final two games and finished third in the tournament.

=== Professional ===
==== Los Angeles Kings (1987–1993) ====
Kudelski was drafted by the Los Angeles Kings first overall in the 1986 NHL Supplemental Draft. He signed with the Kings in August 1987 to a multi-year deal. Kudelski began the 1987–88 season with the Kings, and appeared in his first career NHL game on October 8, 1987, playing on a line with Bourne and Phil Sykes. He was held off the scoresheet in a 4–1 loss to the New York Islanders. On November 19, in his 17th game, Kudelski earned his first career NHL point, an assist on Bourne's first period goal, in a 7–5 loss to the Philadelphia Flyers. That would be the only point Kudelski would register in his rookie season, as he played in 26 games. Following the Kings game on December 10, the club sent Kudelski to their American Hockey League (AHL) affiliate, the New Haven Nighthawks, where he finished the season. With the Nighthawks, Kudelski scored 15 goals and 34 points in 50 games, however, the club failed to reach the post-season. He began the 1988–89 season with the Nighthawks after being demoted during training camp. He was recalled at the end of October 1988 and made his NHL season debut on October 28 in a 7–4 victory over the Winnipeg Jets. With Los Angeles, Kudelski scored his first career NHL goal on February 12, 1989, against Alain Chevrier of the Chicago Blackhawks in a 6-2 win. Overall, in 14 games with the Kings, Kudelski had a goal and four points. He was sent back to New Haven on February 18 and in 60 games in the AHL, Kudelski scored 32 goals and 51 points, helping the club reach the playoffs. In 17 postseason games, Kudelski had eight goals and 13 points, as the Nighthawks lost in the Calder Cup finals to the Adirondack Red Wings.

Kudelski made the Kings for good in 1989–90 and began the season in October on the fourth line alongside Hubie McDonough and Jay Miller. After getting off to a fast start, he was placed on the first line alongside Wayne Gretzky and Luc Robitaille by the end of the month. However, he suffered a hand injury in a fight with Wayne Van Dorp of the Blackhawks on November 22. He returned to the lineup on December 30 against the Flyers. Kudelski finished the season with 23 goals and 36 points in 62 games, helping Los Angeles reach the playoffs. He made his NHL playoff debut on April 4, 1990 in the opening game of the Kings' first round series against the Calgary Flames. On April 12, Kudelski earned his first NHL career playoff point, assisting on the team's only goal by Rob Blake, in a 5–1 loss to the Flames. The Kings eliminated the Flames and moved on to face the Edmonton Oilers in the second round. On April 24, he scored his first NHL career playoff goal against Bill Ranford in a 6–5 loss. The Oilers bounced the Kings from the playoffs and overall, in eight playoff games, Kudelski had a goal and three points.

In 1990–91, Kudelski opened the season on the team's fourth line alongside Steve Kasper and Scott Bjugstad. By January 1991, he was on the top line with Gretzky and Tomas Sandström. However, after Todd Elik went into a slump, Kudelski replaced him as the second-line center, slotted between Robitaille and Dave Taylor. On January 12, Kudelski earned his first career hat trick, scoring three goals on Kirk McLean of the Vancouver Canucks in a 6–2 victory. Kudelski played in 72 games with the Kings, scoring 23 goals and 36 points for the second straight season. The Kings finished atop the Smythe Division and faced the Canucks in the opening round of the playoffs. Kudelski was placed on a line with Kasper and Mike Donnelly, they were used to shut down the Canucks' top line of Trevor Linden, Cliff Ronning, and Geoff Courtnall. The Kings beat the Canucks and advanced to the next round where they faced the Oilers. However, Kudelski was knocked out of the series in the second game with a knee injury. Ultimately, the Oilers eliminated the Kings for the second consecutive playoffs. In the post-season, Kudelski scored three goals and five points in eight games.

Going into the 1991–92 season, Kudelski was expected to be the team's permanent second line center situated between Robitaille and Tony Granato. On October 16, Kudelski set a career high with four points in a game, as he scored a hat trick and added an assist, as Los Angeles defeated the San Jose Sharks 8–5. He was inadvertently called out by the Kings' former second line center, Bernie Nicholls, who in searching for a place to play other than with the Oilers in October, questioned whether the Kings had any on the team and if he would not be a good fit. This was angrily rebutted by Kudelski but by December, Kudelski was struggling in the role. Head coach Tom Webster shuffled his lines often and Kudelski ended up playing all over the roster such as playing on the third line with Sandström and Ilkka Sinisalo or on the first line with Gretzky and Jari Kurri. In 80 games, Kudelski scored 22 goals and 43 points. In the post-season, Kudelski appeared in all six games, however, he was held off the scoresheet as the Oilers eliminated the Kings again. Kudelski began the 1992–93 season with the Kings, and new head coach Barry Melrose was unfamiliar with him and did not see him as having a defined role. Kudelski soon found himself out of Melrose's plans as he was a healthy scratch for four games in October. By November, he had only played in nine of the Kings' 22 games and requested a trade if he did not see more playing time. Melrose acquiesced to his demand, saying that Kudelski did not fit his plans for the team. With the Kings he scored three goals and six points in 15 games.

==== Ottawa Senators (1992–1994) ====
Kudelski was traded to the expansion Ottawa Senators by Los Angeles with center Shawn McCosh for forwards Marc Fortier and Jim Thomson on December 19, 1992. He made his debut with Ottawa on December 21 in a 4–3 loss to the Washington Capitals, skating on a line with Dave Archibald and Jody Hull. He notched his first goal and point for the team on December 27, scoring Ottawa's only goal against Stéphane Fiset in a 6–1 loss to the Quebec Nordiques. On January 10, 1993, Kudelski recorded a hat trick with the Senators, the first in franchise history, in a 3–2 victory over the Sharks. Playing on a line with Mark Freer and Sylvain Turgeon, he scored all three goals in the first period. He recorded a three-point night on February 3, scoring twice and assisting on another by Doug Smail in a 3–2 victory over the Oilers. A month later on March 4, he scored once and assisted on two other goals by Neil Brady and Rob Murphy in an 8–6 loss to his former team, the Kings. In 48 games with Ottawa, he scored 21 goals and 35 points as the team finished last in the league.

In 1993–94, Kudelski had a breakout season, getting off to a hot start. He had a hat trick in a come-from-behind 7–6 victory overtime victory over the Jets on November 5. His heightened scoring coincided with being placed on a line with rookie Alexei Yashin and Dave McLlwain. He was selected to represent the Senators as their representative at the 1994 NHL All-Star Game. However, he rejected a contract extension offer from the Senators as it would have paid him less than he was already making. At the end of December and extending into early January 1994, his scoring touch went cold for the Senators after scoring his team-leading 26th goal, going eight games without a goal. In 42 games with Ottawa, he had 26 goals and 41 points.

==== Florida Panthers (1993–1996) ====
Kudelski was caught by surprise when the Senators traded him to the Florida Panthers for forwards Evgeny Davydov, Scott Levins, the Panthers sixth round draft pick in the 1994 NHL entry draft, and the Dallas Stars' fourth round draft pick, previously acquired by Florida, in the 1995 NHL entry draft on January 6, 1994. He made his Panthers debut on January 8, in a 2–2 tie game with the Boston Bruins, playing with Jesse Bélanger and Andrei Lomakin to start the game, but finishing with Stu Barnes and Bill Lindsay to finish. He recorded his first goal and assisted on another for the team in a 5–2 victory over the Montreal Canadiens on January 15. On January 19, tallied three points, scoring twice and assisting on another by Bélanger in a 5–1 win over the Washington Capitals. Kudelski represented the Panthers in the 1994 NHL All-Star Game held at Madison Square Garden, being replaced by Yashin as Ottawa's representative. Kudelski scored the first goal for the Eastern Conference along with the game-tying goal, as the Eastern Conference defeated the Western Conference by a score of 9–8. In March, Kudelski's scoring touch went cold again, going 13 games without a goal. In 44 games with the Panthers, Kudelski scored 14 goals and 29 points.

In the offseason, Kudelski became a restricted free agent. General manager Bryan Murray made an offer to Kudelski, which he rejected and sat out the beginning of training camp. Finally, on September 8, the two parties came to an agreement and Kudelski reported to training camp. However, the 1994–95 season was delayed on account of the 1994–95 NHL lockout, and only began on January 21, 1995, with Kudelski back on a line with Bélanger and Lomakin. However, by March, he began to see his ice time cut and be a healthy scratch as his scoring dropped. He also started showing up in trade rumors. His situation worsened after the acquisition of Gaétan Duchesne from San Jose, who was expected to fill Kudelski's role on the team. Despite requesting a trade, no other team sought to acquire Kudelski and he remained with Florida. He finished the season with six goals and nine points in 26 games.

At the beginning of the 1995–96 season, Kudelski was left exposed in the waiver draft, but went unclaimed. He remained with the Panthers, playing on the team's fourth line, but failed to impress and by December, the coaching staff indicated the Kudelski no longer had a place in the lineup. He earned only one assist in 13 games with the Panthers. He was placed on waivers again in January 1996, having been a healthy scratch in 15 of the last 16 games. After going unclaimed again, he was assigned to the Panthers' American Hockey League (AHL) affiliate, the Carolina Monarchs. In four AHL games, he recorded one goal. In February, he was sent home by the Monarchs and the remainder of his contract was bought out. He retired after the season.

== Personal life ==
Following his hockey career, he operated businesses in Naples, Florida and Wyoming. Beginning in 2004, he became a property developer in Wyoming, and later, Utah.

== Career statistics ==
=== Regular season and playoffs ===
			Regular season					Playoffs
Season	Team	League	GP	G	A	Pts	PIM	GP	G	A	Pts	PIM
1983–84	Yale University	ECAC	21	14	12	26	12	—	—	—	—	—
1984–85	Yale University	ECAC	32	21	23	44	38	—	—	—	—	—
1985–86	Yale University	ECAC	31	18	23	41	48	—	—	—	—	—
1986–87	Yale University	ECAC	30	25	22	47	34	—	—	—	—	—
1987–88	Los Angeles Kings	NHL	26	0	1	1	8	—	—	—	—	—
1987–88	New Haven Nighthawks	AHL	50	15	19	34	41	—	—	—	—	—
1988–89	Los Angeles Kings	NHL	14	1	3	4	17	—	—	—	—	—
1988–89	New Haven Nighthawks	AHL	60	32	19	51	43	17	8	5	13	12
1989–90	Los Angeles Kings	NHL	62	23	13	36	49	8	1	2	3	2
1990–91	Los Angeles Kings	NHL	72	23	13	36	46	8	3	2	5	2
1991–92	Los Angeles Kings	NHL	80	22	21	43	42	6	0	0	0	0
1992–93	Los Angeles Kings	NHL	15	3	3	6	8	—	—	—	—	—
1992–93	Ottawa Senators	NHL	48	21	14	35	22	—	—	—	—	—
1993–94	Ottawa Senators	NHL	42	26	15	41	14	—	—	—	—	—
1993–94	Florida Panthers	NHL	44	14	15	29	10	—	—	—	—	—
1994–95	Florida Panthers	NHL	26	6	3	9	2	—	—	—	—	—
1995–96	Carolina Monarchs	AHL	4	1	0	1	0	—	—	—	—	—
1995–96	Florida Panthers	NHL	13	0	1	1	0	—	—	—	—	—
NHL totals			442	139	102	241	218	22	4	4	8	4

== Awards and honors ==
Award	Year
All-ECAC Hockey First Team	1986–87
Played in NHL All-Star Game	1994
