= Mokosak =

Mokosak is a surname. Notable people with the surname include:

- Carl Mokosak (born 1962), Canadian ice hockey player
- John Mokosak (born 1963), Canadian ice hockey player, brother of Carl
