= Statue of Luc Robitaille =

Sculpture in Los Angeles, California, U.S.

- The sculpture in 2022
- Artist: Julie Rotblatt Amrany; Omri Amrany; Itamar Amrany
- Medium: Bronze sculpture
- Subject: Luc Robitaille
- Location: Los Angeles, California, U.S.; 34°2′37.2″N 118°15′57.8″W

A statue of ice hockey player Luc Robitaille by artists Julie Rotblatt Amrany, Omri Amrany, and Itamar Amrany is installed outside Los Angeles' Crypto.com Arena, in the U.S. state of California. The bronze sculpture was unveiled in 2015.
