= Justin Hocking (ice hockey) =

Canadian ice hockey player

- Born: January 9, 1974 (age 52) Stettler, Alberta, Canada
- Height: 6 ft 1 in (185 cm)
- Weight: 185 lb (84 kg; 13 st 3 lb)
- Position: Defence
- Shot: Right
- Played for: Los Angeles Kings; Manchester Storm
- NHL draft: 39th overall, 1992; Los Angeles Kings
- Playing career: 1993–2002

Justin Hocking (born January 9, 1974) is a Canadian former professional ice hockey defenceman who played one game in the National Hockey League (NHL) with the Los Angeles Kings during the 1993–94 NHL season. The rest of his career, which lasted from 1993 to 2002, was spent in the minor leagues.

Born in Stettler, Alberta, Hocking was selected in the second round (39th overall) in the 1992 NHL entry draft by the Los Angeles Kings.

Hocking also played in the International Hockey League, ECHL, American Hockey League and later in the British Ice Hockey Superleague.

== Career statistics ==
=== Regular season and playoffs ===
			Regular season					Playoffs
Season	Team	League	GP	G	A	Pts	PIM	GP	G	A	Pts	PIM
1990–91	Fort Saskatchewan Traders	AJHL	38	4	6	10	84	—	—	—	—	—
1991–92	Spokane Chiefs	WHL	71	4	6	10	309	10	0	3	3	28
1992–93	Spokane Chiefs	WHL	16	0	1	1	75	—	—	—	—	—
1992–93	Medicine Hat Tigers	WHL	54	1	9	10	119	10	0	1	1	13
1993–94	Los Angeles Kings	NHL	1	0	0	0	0	—	—	—	—	—
1993–94	Medicine Hat Tigers	WHL	68	7	26	33	226	3	0	0	0	6
1993–94	Phoenix Roadrunners	IHL	3	0	0	0	15	—	—	—	—	—
1994–95	Syracuse Crunch	AHL	7	0	0	0	24	—	—	—	—	—
1994–95	Portland Pirates	AHL	9	0	1	1	34	—	—	—	—	—
1994–95	Knoxville Cherokees	ECHL	20	0	6	6	70	4	0	0	0	26
1994–95	Phoenix Roadrunners	IHL	20	1	1	2	50	1	0	0	0	0
1995–96	Prince Edward Island Senators	AHL	74	4	8	12	251	4	0	2	2	5
1996–97	Worcester IceCats	AHL	68	1	10	11	198	5	0	3	3	2
1997–98	Worcester IceCats	AHL	79	5	12	17	198	11	1	2	3	19
1998–99	Indianapolis Ice	IHL	34	2	4	6	111	—	—	—	—	—
1998–99	St. John's Maple Leafs	AHL	44	4	6	10	99	5	0	0	0	2
1999–00	St. John's Maple Leafs	AHL	68	4	9	13	175	—	—	—	—	—
2000–01	Springfield Falcons	AHL	60	0	7	7	114	—	—	—	—	—
2000–01	Grand Rapids Griffins	IHL	6	0	0	0	12	—	—	—	—	—
2001–02	Manchester Storm	BISL	19	1	1	2	22	—	—	—	—	—
AHL totals			409	18	53	71	1093	25	1	7	8	28
NHL totals			1	0	0	0	0	—	—	—	—	—

== See also ==
- List of players who played only one game in the NHL
