= Carl Mokosak =

Canadian ice hockey player

- Born: September 22, 1962 (age 63) Fort Saskatchewan, Alberta, Canada
- Height: 6 ft 1 in (185 cm)
- Weight: 200 lb (91 kg; 14 st 4 lb)
- Position: Left wing
- Shot: Left
- Played for: Calgary Flames; Los Angeles Kings; Philadelphia Flyers; Pittsburgh Penguins; Boston Bruins
- NHL draft: Undrafted
- Playing career: 1982–1991

Carl Mokosak (born September 22, 1962) is a Canadian former professional ice hockey player. He played in a total of 83 games in the National Hockey League with the Calgary Flames, Los Angeles Kings, Philadelphia Flyers, Pittsburgh Penguins, and Boston Bruins between 1981 and 1989. Mokosak played left wing and scored 11 goals while adding 15 assists over his NHL career. The rest of his career, which lasted from 1982 to 1991, was spent in various minor leagues.

Born in Fort Saskatchewan, Alberta, Mokosak played junior hockey for the Brandon Wheat Kings. In 1982, Mokosak had a tryout with the Calgary Flames who signed him to a contract. The following season, he played 41 games for the Flames. Mokosak would play until the 1990–91 season, mostly in the minor leagues with several stints in the NHL.

Carl is the brother of John Mokosak. He now coaches Rams Hockey in Rockford, Michigan.

== Career statistics ==
=== Regular season and playoffs ===
			Regular season					Playoffs
Season	Team	League	GP	G	A	Pts	PIM	GP	G	A	Pts	PIM
1979–80	Brandon Travellers	MJHL	44	12	11	23	146	—	—	—	—	—
1979–80	Brandon Wheat Kings	WHL	61	12	21	33	226	1	0	4	4	66
1980–81	Brandon Wheat Kings	WHL	70	28	44	72	363	5	1	3	4	12
1981–82	Brandon Wheat Kings	WHL	69	46	61	107	363	4	0	1	1	11
1981–82	Calgary Flames	NHL	1	0	1	1	0	—	—	—	—	—
1981–82	Oklahoma City Stars	CHL	2	1	1	2	2	4	1	1	2	0
1982–83	Calgary Flames	NHL	41	7	6	13	87	—	—	—	—	—
1982–83	Colorado Flames	CHL	28	10	12	22	106	5	1	0	1	12
1983–84	New Haven Nighthawks	AHL	80	18	21	39	206	—	—	—	—	—
1984–85	New Haven Nighthawks	AHL	11	6	6	12	26	—	—	—	—	—
1984–85	Los Angeles Kings	NHL	30	4	8	12	43	—	—	—	—	—
1985–86	Hershey Bears	AHL	79	30	42	72	312	16	0	4	4	111
1985–86	Philadelphia Flyers	NHL	1	0	0	0	5	—	—	—	—	—
1986–87	Baltimore Skipjacks	AHL	67	23	27	50	228	—	—	—	—	—
1986–87	Pittsburgh Penguins	NHL	3	0	0	0	4	—	—	—	—	—
1987–88	Muskegon Lumberjacks	IHL	81	29	37	66	308	6	3	2	5	60
1988–89	Boston Bruins	NHL	7	0	0	0	31	1	0	0	0	0
1988–89	Maine Mariners	AHL	53	20	18	38	337	—	—	—	—	—
1989–90	Fort Wayne Komets	IHL	55	12	21	33	315	—	—	—	—	—
1989–90	Phoenix Roadrunners	IHL	15	6	6	12	48	—	—	—	—	—
1990–91	San Diego Gulls	IHL	5	0	0	0	30	—	—	—	—	—
1990–91	Indianapolis Ice	IHL	70	12	26	38	205	5	0	0	0	2
NHL totals			83	11	15	26	170	1	0	0	0	0
