= Dmitri Klevakin =

Russian ice hockey player

- Born: February 20, 1976 (age 50) Angarsk, USSR
- Height: 6 ft 0 in (183 cm)
- Weight: 185 lb (84 kg; 13 st 3 lb)
- Position: Right wing
- Shot: Left
- Played for: HC Spartak Moscow; Metallurg Novokuznetsk; Salavat Yulaev Ufa; HC MVD
- NHL draft: 86th overall, 1994; Tampa Bay Lightning
- Playing career: 1993–2011

Dmitri Vladimirovich Klevakin (Russian: Дмитрий Владимирович Клевакин; born February 20, 1976) is a Russian former professional ice hockey player. He played in the Russian Superleague for HC Spartak Moscow, Metallurg Novokuznetsk, Salavat Yulaev Ufa and HC MVD. He was drafted 96th overall in the 1994 NHL entry draft by the Tampa Bay Lightning.

== Career statistics ==
			Regular season					Playoffs
Season	Team	League	GP	G	A	Pts	PIM	GP	G	A	Pts	PIM
1992–93	HC Spartak Moscow	Russia	8	1	1	2	0	—	—	—	—	—
1993–94	HC Spartak Moscow	Russia	42	6	3	9	6	—	—	—	—	—
1994–95	HC Spartak Moscow	Russia	52	12	10	22	4	—	—	—	—	—
1995–96	HC Spartak Moscow	Russia	49	8	15	23	54	—	—	—	—	—
1996–97	HC Spartak Moscow	Russia	41	5	12	17	35	—	—	—	—	—
1996–97	SAK Moscow	Russia3	3	1	0	1	0	—	—	—	—	—
1997–98	HC Spartak Moscow	Russia	18	0	2	2	6	—	—	—	—	—
1998–99	Metallurg Novokuznetsk	Russia	42	14	6	20	4	6	0	1	1	2
1999–00	Metallurg Novokuznetsk	Russia	23	3	7	10	6	—	—	—	—	—
2001–02	HC Spartak Moscow	Russia	41	11	8	19	18	—	—	—	—	—
2002–03	HC Spartak Moscow	Russia	49	4	7	11	41	—	—	—	—	—
2003–04	Krylya Sovetov Moscow	Russia2	30	11	8	19	34	—	—	—	—	—
2003–04	Salavat Yulaev Ufa	Russia	25	5	4	9	4	—	—	—	—	—
2004–05	Salavat Yulaev Ufa	Russia	9	0	1	1	4	—	—	—	—	—
2004–05	Salavat Yulaev Ufa-2	Russia3	1	0	1	1	0	—	—	—	—	—
2004–05	HK MVD Balashikha	Russia2	26	3	5	8	14	9	0	0	0	4
2004–05	HK Tver	Russia3	7	2	7	9	2	—	—	—	—	—
2005–06	Khimik Voskresensk	Russia2	48	10	12	22	38	5	0	0	0	6
2006–07	Titan Klin	Russia2	22	5	11	16	6	—	—	—	—	—
2007–08	Krylya Sovetov Moscow	Russia2	45	13	22	35	44	—	—	—	—	—
2007–08	Krylya Sovetov Moscow-2	Russia3	2	0	2	2	0	—	—	—	—	—
2008–09	MHC Krylya Sovetov	Russia2	60	13	20	33	28	15	6	6	12	16
2009–10	HC Rys	Russia2	14	1	1	2	24	—	—	—	—	—
2009–10	THK Tver	Russia2	17	4	2	6	4	—	—	—	—	—
2009–10	Ertis Pavlodar	Kazakhstan	18	2	3	5	8	7	0	2	2	2
2010–11	Titan Klin	Russia3	9	0	1	1	16	—	—	—	—	—
Russia totals			399	69	76	145	182	6	0	1	1	2
Russia2 totals			262	60	81	141	192	29	6	6	12	26
