= Luc Robitaille =

Canadian-American ice hockey player (born 1966)

CM Luc Robitaille
- Hockey Hall of Fame, 2009
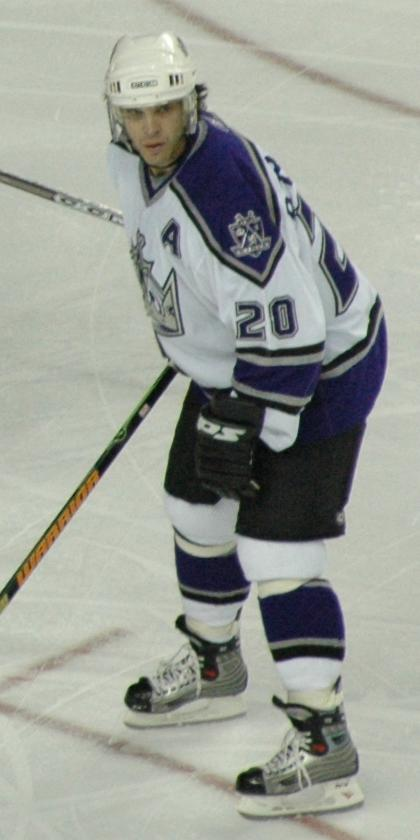
- Robitaille with the Los Angeles Kings in 2005
- Born: February 17, 1966 (age 60) Montreal, Quebec, Canada
- Height: 6 ft 1 in (185 cm)
- Weight: 204 lb (93 kg; 14 st 8 lb)
- Position: Left wing
- Shot: Left
- Played for: Los Angeles Kings; Pittsburgh Penguins; New York Rangers; Detroit Red Wings
- National team: Canada
- NHL draft: 171st overall, 1984; Los Angeles Kings
- Playing career: 1986–2006
Medal record
Men's ice hockey
Representing Canada
World Championships
Gold medal – first place	1994 Italy
World Cup of Hockey
Gold medal – first place	1991 Canada
World Junior Championships
Silver medal – second place	1986 Canada

Luc Jean-Marie Robitaille (born February 17, 1966) is a Canadian-American professional ice hockey executive and former player who serves as president of the Los Angeles Kings of the National Hockey League (NHL).

During his 19-season NHL career, Robitaille won the Stanley Cup in 2001–02 with the Detroit Red Wings, and played for the Pittsburgh Penguins and New York Rangers. He is most known for his 14 seasons (over three different stints) with the Los Angeles Kings, whom with he won the Calder Memorial Trophy as top rookie, and was named to eight NHL All-Star teams (five at First team and three at Second team). He served as the Kings' team captain during the 1992–93 season (while Wayne Gretzky was injured) and for the final two games of the 2005–06 season. Robitaille retired after the 2005–06 season as the highest-scoring left winger in NHL history and the holder of several Kings franchise records, along with numerous Kings playoff records. In 2017, Robitaille was named one of the "100 Greatest NHL Players" in history.

== Junior hockey career ==
Robitaille was drafted by the Los Angeles Kings in the ninth round, 171st overall, of the 1984 NHL entry draft. Many hockey experts expected Robitaille to be drafted late in the draft due to his poor skating ability. Robitaille himself has stated he had only had contact with one NHL team during his junior career, the Kings. He happened to be attending the 1984 draft (in the stands) and later introduced himself to first-year Kings general manager Rogie Vachon.

Robitaille and former teammate Dave Taylor are the lowest NHL draft picks to have recorded 1,000 career points. During the 1984 NHL Entry Draft, the Kings drafted future Baseball Hall-of-Famer Tom Glavine in the fourth round, over 100 spots before Robitaille.

Robitaille played junior hockey for the Hull Olympiques of the Quebec Major Junior Hockey League (QMJHL). In three seasons with the Olympiques from 1983 to 1986, Robitaille amassed 155 goals and 269 assists for 424 points in only 197 games, including winning the CHL Player of the Year with 191 points in 1985–86. In his honour, the QMJHL later created the Luc Robitaille Trophy, awarded to the team which scores the most goals each season.

== National Hockey League career ==
=== Los Angeles Kings (1986–1994) ===
Robitaille's first NHL season was in 1986–87, where he helped the Kings qualify for the 1987 Stanley Cup playoffs despite a 31–41–8 record. He scored 45 goals and had 39 assists in 79 games, edging out Philadelphia Flyers goaltender Ron Hextall for the Calder Memorial Trophy for the NHL's top rookie, the only Los Angeles player to ever win the award. He also earned a spot on the second All-Star team.

Robitaille scored more than 40 goals in each of his first eight seasons, including three 50 or more goal seasons, with a career-high 63 in 1992–93. That year, Robitaille set NHL records for most goals and points (125) in a season by a left winger. Robitaille's 63-goal record amongst left wingers was eclipsed by Alexander Ovechkin during the 2007–08 season, although Robitaille still holds the record for most points in a season by a left winger. With captain and superstar Wayne Gretzky sidelined by injury for much of 1992–93, Robitaille assumed the captaincy and led the team in scoring, playing a key role in helping his struggling team to make the playoffs. In 1993, the Kings reached the Stanley Cup Final for the first time in franchise history. However, they lost to the Montreal Canadiens in five games. Robitaille had 9 goals and 13 assists in 24 playoff games.

During the 1993–94 season, Robitaille's scoring totals remained respectable but considerably lower than his previous seasons, while Gretzky had returned from injury to win the NHL scoring title. The Kings failed to make the 1994 playoffs.

=== Pittsburgh Penguins, New York Rangers (1994–1997) ===
On July 29, 1994, Robitaille was traded to the Pittsburgh Penguins in exchange for Rick Tocchet and the Penguins' second-round pick in the 1995 NHL entry draft (used to select Pavel Rosa). With Pittsburgh, Robitaille set then-career lows in goals and assists during the lockout-shortened 1994–95 season.

After one season, Robitaille was traded to the New York Rangers (alongside Ulf Samuelsson) in exchange for Petr Nedvěd and Sergei Zubov. Robitaille had below-average numbers in two seasons with the Rangers, and for the first time in his career, had more penalty minutes (80) than points (69) in 1995–96.

=== Return to Los Angeles (1997–2001) ===
On August 28, 1997, in new general manager Dave Taylor's first move, the Kings re-acquired Robitaille from the Rangers in exchange for Kevin Stevens.

Robitaille struggled in his first season back in Los Angeles, scoring only 16 goals in an injury-shortened 1997–98 season. However, in the 1998–99 season, Robitaille returned to his All-Star form, scoring no fewer than 36 goals and had the best stats of his career after his first stint with the Kings during those three seasons. On January 7, 1999, he scored his 500th career goal in a 4–2 victory at the Great Western Forum against the Buffalo Sabres.

During the 2000–01 season, Robitaille scored 37 goals and 88 points. In the 2000–01 playoffs, Robitaille helped the seventh-seeded Kings to a first-round upset of the Detroit Red Wings, and his team took the eventual Stanley Cup champion Colorado Avalanche to seven games in the conference semifinals. Robitaille was named a second team all-star, his first post-season team honour since 1993. Robitaille turned down a one-year deal with a substantial pay cut by Kings GM Dave Taylor.

=== Detroit Red Wings (2001–2003) ===
Robitaille signed a two-year, $9 million contract with the Red Wings beginning in the 2001–02 season, accepting less compensation than what other teams offered because the Red Wings represented his best chance at winning the Stanley Cup, particularly after their recent acquisition of goaltender Dominik Hašek.

In his first season with the Red Wings, Robitaille scored 30 goals and 50 points, helping them win the Presidents' Trophy, awarded to the team with the best regular season record. Due to the tremendous depth of scorers among Detroit's roster, Robitaille had less playoff ice time, although he still scored four playoff goals. The Red Wings defeated the Avalanche in the Western Conference Final in seven games, meaning that Robitaille was going to the Stanley Cup Final for the second time in his career. With the Red Wings' 3–1 victory in game five against the Carolina Hurricanes, Robitaille's quest for an elusive Stanley Cup championship finally came to an end. At the direction of Red Wings captain Steve Yzerman, all of the teammates who had never previously won the Cup would hoist it after Yzerman, with Robitaille being the third Red Wing to skate the Cup around Joe Louis Arena, after Yzerman and Hašek.

Robitaille then had the lowest goal total in his career in 2002–03, due partially to limited ice time, and the Red Wings were upset in the first round of the playoffs by the Mighty Ducks of Anaheim in a four-game sweep.

=== Final stint with Los Angeles (2003–2006) ===
Robitaille returned to Kings as a free agent for the 2003–04 season. Although his scoring totals (22 goals and 29 assists) were below his previous levels as a King, he did lead the team in both goals and points, and the Kings stayed in playoff contention until a shocking 11-game losing streak to finish the season. On March 9, 2004, Robitaille scored the 650th goal of his professional career in a 3–2 victory over the Phoenix Coyotes at Staples Center. He played his 1,000th game as a King a few days later, on March 13, 2004, in a 3–1 loss to the San Jose Sharks at HP Pavilion at San Jose.

On January 19, 2006, during a game against the Atlanta Thrashers, Robitaille scored a hat-trick, tying and passing Marcel Dionne's then-franchise record of 550 goals. His record-breaking goal was met with several minutes of standing ovations and a video-congratulation reel on the scoreboard. On April 10, the Kings announced Robitaille's intention to retire at the conclusion of the 2005–06 NHL season. Robitaille officially confirmed this the next day in a press conference held at the Toyota Sports Center in El Segundo, California. Robitaille's final goal and point was scored in typical Luc Robitaille fashion: one-timing a pass from Jeremy Roenick while at the centre of the right wing face-off circle past goaltender Curtis Joseph during a power play in a March 14, 2006, 6–2 loss to the Phoenix Coyotes. Robitaille played his final NHL home game as a Los Angeles King against the Calgary Flames on April 15, 2006. He also wore the captain's "C" that normally belonged to defenceman Mattias Norström. Although he was held without a point in the game, he logged 18:37 of ice time and had four shots on goal. He was also the second shooter in the shootout, but his shot towards the upper-right corner of the net was stopped by the glove of goaltender Miikka Kiprusoff, despite being given an open five hole. The Kings ultimately won the game 2–1 off of a shootout goal by Pavol Demitra and three shootout saves by Kings goaltender Jason LaBarbera. The Kings held a curtain call for Robitaille after the game, where he was given a standing ovation by the sell-out crowd of 18,118 fans in attendance. After chants of his name died down, he gave a short speech and did one final lap of the rink at Staples Center.

Robitaille finished his playing career on April 17, 2006, at the HP Pavilion in a game against the San Jose Sharks. The Kings won 4–0. He received applause and chants of "Luuuc, Luuuc!" throughout the night by the 17,496 fans in attendance, as well as good wishes from many of the opposing players of the Sharks. After the game ended, the Kings players came out and gathered around him first, rather than the traditional congratulation of the goaltender. The Sharks players also came onto the ice to shake hands with Robitaille before they headed off into their locker room.

== Legacy ==
At the end of his career, Robitaille had made eight NHL All-Star teams (five First team selections, three Second team selections), set the NHL record for goals by a left winger (with 668) and points (with 1,394), as well the Kings' franchise record for goals, with 577, finished second to Dave Taylor in games played, fourth (behind Marcel Dionne, Wayne Gretzky and Taylor) in assists with 726, second behind John Bucyk's NHL record for assists by a left winger (813), and second to Dionne in points, with 1,154. Robitaille also became the second player in NHL history to record 1,000 points after being drafted as low as the ninth round.

The Kings honored his playing career by retiring his number during a pre-game ceremony on January 20, 2007. Robitaille's number 20 hangs in the rafters of Crypto.com arena alongside those of Rogatien Vachon, Marcel Dionne, Dave Taylor, Wayne Gretzky, Rob Blake, and Dustin Brown.

On June 23, 2009, it was announced Robitaille would be inducted into the Hockey Hall of Fame. He was honored during the November 6–9 induction weekend alongside his former Detroit Red Wing teammates Steve Yzerman and Brett Hull and former Ranger teammate Brian Leetch.

On March 7, 2015, the Kings organization unveiled a bronze statue of Robitaille outside of the Staples Center honouring his accomplishments as an NHL player and as a member of the Kings. The statue is located near the main entrance to the arena, next to the statue honoring former Kings and teammate Wayne Gretzky.

== United States Hockey League ==
On July 6, 2006, Robitaille was named president of the Omaha Lancers of the United States Hockey League (USHL).

== International play ==
Robitaille has participated in three international tournaments for Canada:

- 1986 World Junior Championships
- 1991 Canada Cup
- 1994 World Championships

The gold medal at the 1994 world championship was Canada's first title in 33 years. Going unbeaten through the tournament, Canada faced Finland in the final. Finland took the lead, but Canada courtesy of Rod Brind'Amour tied the game. Ten minutes of overtime solved nothing, and the game went into a shoot out. In the first five shots, Robitaille and Joe Sakic scored for Canada, but Jari Kurri and Mikko Mäkelä responded for the Finns, meaning the game moved to a sudden-victory shootout. Robitaille was up first for Canada and, despite losing the puck on his approach, was able to beat Jarmo Myllys to put the pressure on the Finns. Bill Ranford made the save, and Canada was once again world champion. "I'm not sure I've ever jumped so high in my life," Robitaille said later of his reaction after Ranford's final save. "It was just such a relief, and the celebration was something I will never forget."

== Executive career ==
Robitaille was named the Kings' president of business operations on May 25, 2007. He also serves as the team's alternate governor. Since joining the Kings in a management role, the team has won two Stanley Cups, in 2011–12 and 2013–14. On April 10, 2017, Robitaille was named president of the Kings.

== Other work ==
Robitaille and his wife Stacia co-founded the non-profit charity Shelter for Serenity in 2005 to help families displaced by Hurricane Katrina, and has extended to needy children in the Los Angeles community as Echoes of Hope.

Robitaille made an appearance on the FOX TV series Bones in the season 4 episode "Fire in the Ice". He appears as himself in an hallucination had by lead character Seeley Booth (portrayed by David Boreanaz, a passionate hockey fan), when Booth is knocked out while playing in a recreational hockey game.

Robitaille also appeared in the movie Sudden Death. The directors used this to their advantage, sending Robitaille in on a breakaway to tie the game as time expired.

In Canada, Robitaille appeared alongside New Jersey Devils goaltender Martin Brodeur in a Delissio frozen pizza commercial, where the two watch footage of Robitaille's many goals against Brodeur while sharing a pizza.

Robitaille made a cameo appearance as himself in the 1994 movie, D2: The Mighty Ducks, and voiced himself in the Phineas and Ferb episode "For Your Ice Only".

He also made a cameo appearance as himself in the 15th episode of the eighth season of the CBS sitcom How I Met Your Mother. He is featured, among other Canadian celebrities, in Underneath the Tunes, a parody of VH1's Behind the Music.

== Personal life ==
Robitaille is married to Stacia (née Toten, formerly McQueen). They have a son born on June 2, 1995. Robitaille's stepson from his wife's first marriage, Steven, is grandson of actor Steve McQueen and is an actor in the TV series The Vampire Diaries.

Robitaille became an American citizen in 2005 and first registered to vote in 2008.

== Career statistics ==
=== League play ===
			Regular season					Playoffs
Season	Team	League	GP	G	A	Pts	PIM	GP	G	A	Pts	PIM
1982–83	Bourassa Angevins	QMAAA	48	36	57	93	28	7	9	6	13	14
1983–84	Hull Olympiques	QMJHL	70	32	53	85	50	—	—	—	—	—
1984–85	Hull Olympiques	QMJHL	64	55	93	148	115	5	4	2	6	27
1985–86	Hull Olympiques	QMJHL	63	68	123	191	93	15	17	27	44	28
1986–87	Los Angeles Kings	NHL	79	45	39	84	28	5	1	4	5	2
1987–88	Los Angeles Kings	NHL	80	53	58	111	82	5	2	5	7	18
1988–89	Los Angeles Kings	NHL	78	46	52	98	65	11	2	6	8	10
1989–90	Los Angeles Kings	NHL	80	52	49	101	38	10	5	5	10	12
1990–91	Los Angeles Kings	NHL	76	45	46	91	68	12	12	4	16	22
1991–92	Los Angeles Kings	NHL	80	44	63	107	95	6	3	4	7	12
1992–93	Los Angeles Kings	NHL	84	63	62	125	100	24	9	13	22	28
1993–94	Los Angeles Kings	NHL	83	44	42	86	86	—	—	—	—	—
1994–95	Pittsburgh Penguins	NHL	46	23	19	42	37	12	7	4	11	26
1995–96	New York Rangers	NHL	77	23	46	69	80	11	1	5	6	8
1996–97	New York Rangers	NHL	69	24	24	48	48	15	4	7	11	4
1997–98	Los Angeles Kings	NHL	57	16	24	40	66	4	1	2	3	6
1998–99	Los Angeles Kings	NHL	82	39	35	74	54	—	—	—	—	—
1999–00	Los Angeles Kings	NHL	71	36	38	74	68	4	2	2	4	6
2000–01	Los Angeles Kings	NHL	82	37	51	88	66	13	4	3	7	10
2001–02	Detroit Red Wings	NHL	81	30	20	50	38	23	4	5	9	10
2002–03	Detroit Red Wings	NHL	81	11	20	31	50	4	1	0	1	0
2003–04	Los Angeles Kings	NHL	80	22	29	51	56	—	—	—	—	—
2005–06	Los Angeles Kings	NHL	65	15	9	24	52	—	—	—	—	—
NHL totals			1,431	668	726	1,394	1,177	159	58	69	127	174

=== International ===
Year	Team	Event	GP	G	A	Pts	PIM
1986	Canada	WJC	7	3	5	8	2
1991	Canada	CC	8	1	2	3	10
1994	Canada	WC	8	4	4	8	2
Junior totals			7	3	5	8	2
Senior totals			16	5	6	11	12

== Awards and honours ==
- President's Cup - 1986
- Guy Lafleur Trophy - 1986
- CHL Player of the Year - 1986
- Calder Memorial Trophy – 1987
- Named to the NHL All-Rookie Team – 1987
- Played in eight NHL All-Star Games – 1988, 1989, 1990, 1991, 1992, 1993, 1999, 2001
- Lifetime Achievement Award from the Aquatic Foundation of Metropolitan Los Angeles – June 8, 2006
- 2007 Great Ones Award from the Jim Murray Memorial Foundation
- Stanley Cup champion – 2002
- Jersey #20 retired by Los Angeles Kings
- Inducted into the Hockey Hall of Fame, 2009
- Won 2012 and 2014 Stanley Cup championships as president of business operations with the Los Angeles Kings

== See also ==
- List of NHL statistical leaders
- List of NHL players with 1,000 points
- List of NHL players with 500 goals
- List of NHL players with 1,000 games played

Preceded by Dan Hodgson	CHL Player of the Year; 1986	Succeeded by Rob Brown
Preceded by Gary Suter	Calder Memorial Trophy winner 1987	Succeeded by Joe Nieuwendyk
Preceded by Wayne Gretzky	Los Angeles Kings captain 1992–1993	Succeeded by Wayne Gretzky
