= John Mokosak =

Canadian ice hockey player

- Born: September 7, 1963 (age 61); Edmonton, Alberta, Canada
- Height: 5 ft 11 in (180 cm)
- Weight: 200 lb (91 kg; 14 st 4 lb)
- Position: Defence
- Shot: Left
- Played for: Detroit Red Wings
- NHL draft: 130th overall, 1983; Hartford Whalers
- Playing career: 1983–1993

John W. Mokosak (born September 7, 1963) is a Canadian former professional ice hockey player who played 41 games in the National Hockey League for the Detroit Red Wings during the 1988–89 and 1989–90 seasons. The rest of his career, which lasted from 1983 to 1993, was spent in the minor leagues. John is the brother of Carl Mokosak.

== Career statistics ==
=== Regular season and playoffs ===
			Regular season					Playoffs
Season	Team	League	GP	G	A	Pts	PIM	GP	G	A	Pts	PIM
1979–80	Fort Saskatchewan Traders	AJHL	58	5	13	18	57	—	—	—	—	—
1980–81	Victoria Cougars	WHL	71	2	18	20	59	15	0	3	3	53
1981–82	Victoria Cougars	WHL	69	6	45	51	102	4	1	1	2	0
1982–83	Victoria Cougars	WHL	70	10	33	43	102	12	0	0	0	8
1983–84	Binghamton Whalers	AHL	79	3	21	24	80	—	—	—	—	—
1984–85	Binghamton Whalers	AHL	54	1	13	14	109	7	0	0	0	12
1984–85	Salt Lake Golden Eagles	IHL	22	1	10	11	41	—	—	—	—	—
1985–86	Binghamton Whalers	AHL	64	0	9	9	196	6	0	0	0	6
1986–87	Binghamton Whalers	AHL	72	2	15	17	187	9	0	2	2	42
1987–88	Springfield Indians	AHL	77	1	16	17	178	—	—	—	—	—
1988–89	Detroit Red Wings	NHL	8	0	1	1	14	—	—	—	—	—
1988–89	Adirondack Red Wings	AHL	65	4	31	35	195	17	0	5	5	49
1989–90	Detroit Red Wings	NHL	33	0	1	1	82	—	—	—	—	—
1989–90	Adirondack Red Wings	AHL	29	2	6	8	80	6	1	3	4	13
1990–91	Maine Mariners	AHL	68	1	12	13	194	2	0	1	1	4
1991–92	Binghamton Rangers	AHL	28	0	2	2	123	9	0	1	1	14
1992–93	Phoenix Roadrunners	IHL	46	4	9	13	169	—	—	—	—	—
AHL totals			536	14	125	139	1342	56	1	12	13	140
NHL totals			41	0	2	2	96	—	—	—	—	—
