= Sylvain Couturier =

Canadian ice hockey player (born 1968)

- Born: April 23, 1968 (age 56); Greenfield Park, Quebec, Canada
- Height: 6 ft 2 in (188 cm)
- Weight: 205 lb (93 kg; 14 st 9 lb)
- Position: Left wing
- Shot: Left
- Played for: Los Angeles Kings; Revier Löwen Oberhausen; Berlin Capitals
- NHL draft: 65th overall, 1986; Los Angeles Kings
- Playing career: 1988–1992

Sylvain Couturier (born April 23, 1968) is a Canadian former professional ice hockey left wing who played 33 games in the National Hockey League (NHL) for the Los Angeles Kings between 1988 and 1991. The rest of his career, which lasted from 1988 to 2001, was mainly spent in the minor leagues. Couturier was the general manager of the Acadie-Bathurst Titan of the Quebec Major Junior Hockey League from 2002 to 2022. He is the father of NHL player Sean Couturier.

Couturier was born in Greenfield Park, Quebec.

== Career statistics ==
=== Regular season and playoffs ===
			Regular season					Playoffs
Season	Team	League	GP	G	A	Pts	PIM	GP	G	A	Pts	PIM
1983–84	Richelieu Eclaireurs	QMAAA	42	11	29	40	22	6	3	5	8	14
1984–85	Richelieu Eclaireurs	QMAAA	42	41	37	58	64	6	4	5	9	6
1985–86	Laval Titan	QMJHL	68	21	37	58	64	14	1	7	8	28
1986–87	Laval Titan	QMJHL	67	39	51	90	77	13	12	14	26	19
1987–88	Laval Titan	QMJHL	67	70	67	137	115	14	12	14	26	17
1988–89	Los Angeles Kings	NHL	16	1	3	4	2	—	—	—	—	—
1988–89	New Haven Nighthawks	AHL	44	18	20	38	33	10	2	2	4	11
1989–90	New Haven Nighthawks	AHL	50	9	8	17	47	—	—	—	—	—
1990–91	Los Angeles Kings	NHL	3	0	1	1	0	—	—	—	—	—
1990–91	Phoenix Roadrunners	IHL	66	50	37	87	49	10	8	2	10	10
1991–92	Los Angeles Kings	NHL	14	3	1	4	2	—	—	—	—	—
1991–92	Phoenix Roadrunners	IHL	39	19	20	39	68	—	—	—	—	—
1992–93	Adirondack Red Wings	AHL	29	17	17	34	12	11	3	5	8	10
1992–93	Phoenix Roadrunners	IHL	38	23	16	39	63	—	—	—	—	—
1992–93	Fort Wayne Komets	IHL	—	—	—	—	—	4	2	3	5	2
1993–94	Milwaukee Admirals	IHL	80	41	51	92	123	4	1	2	3	2
1994–95	Milwaukee Admirals	IHL	77	31	41	72	77	15	1	4	5	10
1995–96	Milwaukee Admirals	IHL	82	33	52	85	60	5	1	0	1	2
1996–97	Milwaukee Admirals	IHL	79	26	24	50	42	3	0	1	1	2
1997–98	Revier Löwen Oberhausen	DEL	39	12	12	24	56	3	0	1	1	0
1998–99	Berlin Capitals	DEL	50	19	12	31	62	—	—	—	—	—
1999–00	Berlin Capitals	DEL	51	11	14	25	52	7	0	3	3	16
2000–01	Berlin Capitals	DEL	5	0	0	0	8	—	—	—	—	—
2000–01	Dragons de Saint-Laurent	QSPHL	4	0	2	2	0	—	—	—	—	—
IHL totals			461	223	241	464	482	41	13	12	25	28
NHL totals			33	4	5	9	4	—	—	—	—	—
