= John McIntyre (ice hockey) =

Canadian ice hockey player

- Born: April 29, 1969 (age 57) Ravenswood, Ontario, Canada
- Height: 6 ft 1 in (185 cm)
- Weight: 181 lb (82 kg; 12 st 13 lb)
- Position: Centre
- Shot: Left
- Played for: Vancouver Canucks; New York Rangers; Los Angeles Kings; Toronto Maple Leafs
- National team: Canada
- NHL draft: 49th overall, 1987; Toronto Maple Leafs
- Playing career: 1989–1996

John McIntyre (born April 29, 1969) is a Canadian former professional ice hockey player who played 351 games in the National Hockey League. He played for the Toronto Maple Leafs, Los Angeles Kings, New York Rangers, and Vancouver Canucks in a career that lasted from 1989 to 1996. Internationally, McIntyre played for Canada at the 1989 World Junior Ice Hockey Championships.

== Career statistics ==
=== Regular season and playoffs ===
| | | | Regular season | | | | | Playoffs |
| Season | Team | League | GP | G | A | Pts | PIM | GP | G | A | Pts | PIM |
|---|---|---|---|---|---|---|---|---|---|---|---|---|
| 1983–84 | Thedford Browns | WJDHL | 34 | 18 | 29 | 47 | 36 | — | — | — | — | — |
| 1984–85 | Strathroy Blades | WOHL | 48 | 23 | 21 | 44 | 49 | — | — | — | — | — |
| 1985–86 | Guelph Platers | OHL | 30 | 4 | 6 | 10 | 25 | 20 | 1 | 5 | 6 | 31 |
| 1986–87 | Guelph Platers | OHL | 47 | 8 | 22 | 30 | 95 | — | — | — | — | — |
| 1987–88 | Guelph Platers | OHL | 39 | 24 | 18 | 42 | 109 | — | — | — | — | — |
| 1988–89 | Guelph Platers | OHL | 52 | 30 | 26 | 56 | 129 | 7 | 5 | 4 | 9 | 25 |
| 1988–89 | Newmarket Saints | AHL | 3 | 0 | 2 | 2 | 7 | 5 | 1 | 1 | 2 | 20 |
| 1989–90 | Toronto Maple Leafs | NHL | 59 | 5 | 12 | 17 | 117 | 2 | 0 | 0 | 0 | 2 |
| 1989–90 | Newmarket Saints | AHL | 6 | 2 | 2 | 4 | 12 | — | — | — | — | — |
| 1990–91 | Toronto Maple Leafs | NHL | 13 | 0 | 3 | 3 | 25 | — | — | — | — | — |
| 1990–91 | Los Angeles Kings | NHL | 56 | 8 | 5 | 13 | 115 | 12 | 0 | 1 | 1 | 24 |
| 1991–92 | Los Angeles Kings | NHL | 73 | 5 | 19 | 24 | 100 | 6 | 0 | 4 | 4 | 12 |
| 1992–93 | Los Angeles Kings | NHL | 49 | 2 | 5 | 7 | 80 | — | — | — | — | — |
| 1992–93 | New York Rangers | NHL | 11 | 1 | 0 | 1 | 4 | — | — | — | — | — |
| 1993–94 | Vancouver Canucks | NHL | 62 | 3 | 6 | 9 | 38 | 24 | 0 | 1 | 1 | 16 |
| 1994–95 | Vancouver Canucks | NHL | 28 | 0 | 4 | 4 | 37 | — | — | — | — | — |
| 1995–96 | Syracuse Crunch | AHL | 53 | 13 | 14 | 27 | 78 | — | — | — | — | — |
| NHL totals | | | 351 | 24 | 54 | 78 | 516 | 44 | 0 | 6 | 6 | 54 |

=== International ===
| Year | Team | Event | GP | G | A | Pts | PIM |
|---|---|---|---|---|---|---|---|
| 1989 | Canada | WJC | 7 | 1 | 0 | 1 | 4 |
| Junior totals | | | 7 | 1 | 0 | 1 | 4 |
