= Mark Hardy (ice hockey) =

Swiss-born Canadian ice hockey player (born 1959)

- Born: February 1, 1959 (age 67) Samedan, Switzerland
- Height: 5 ft 11 in (180 cm)
- Weight: 195 lb (88 kg; 13 st 13 lb)
- Position: Defence
- Shot: Left
- Played for: Los Angeles Kings; New York Rangers; Minnesota North Stars
- National team: Canada
- NHL draft: 30th overall, 1979; Los Angeles Kings
- Playing career: 1979–1994

Mark Hardy (born February 1, 1959) is a Swiss-born Canadian former professional ice hockey defenceman who played 15 seasons in the National Hockey League (NHL) for the Los Angeles Kings, New York Rangers and Minnesota North Stars between 1979 and 1994. A professional hockey coach for 20 years, Hardy was most recently an assistant coach with the Tucson Roadrunners of the American Hockey League (AHL), the top-most minor league affiliate of the Arizona Coyotes.

== NHL career ==
Hardy was born in Switzerland where his father, Lea was playing professional hockey before moving to Montreal as a child. He played four seasons of junior in the Quebec Major Junior Hockey League for the Montreal Juniors and was selected 30th overall by the Los Angeles Kings at the 1979 NHL entry draft.

Hardy is ranked third in all-time scoring by a Los Angeles Kings defenceman. He played 915 career NHL games, scoring 62 goals and 306 assists for 368 points while adding 1293 penalty minutes. His best offensive season was the 1984–85 season when he set career highs with 14 goals and 53 points.

In 1992–93, Hardy and the Kings went to the Stanley Cup Final for the first time in Kings' history. Hardy delivered what was called at the time an "iconic hit" in game three, when the Kings were down 3-0 in the second, putting Montreal Canadiens' Mike Keane through the boards with enough force to disrupt two panes of glass to change the momentum of the game. The Kings scored three second-period goals, but lost 4-3 in overtime.

== Coaching career ==
Retiring from the NHL as a King following the 1993–94 season, Hardy turned to coaching in 1999, serving as an assistant coach for the Los Angeles Kings and the Chicago Blackhawks until 2010.

He returned to the Kings organization in 2011 as an assistant coach with the club's minor league team, the Ontario Reign of the ECHL.

Hardy resigned from the Kings organization in June 2010 after being charged with fourth-degree sexual abuse. Hardy had been arrested in May 2010 after a family member had filed a complaint alleging Hardy had make inappropriate sexual contact with her after they returned to their hotel from a bar. The prosecution eventually decided not to go forward and the charge was dropped.

Hardy accepted a position as assistant coach with the Chicago Wolves of the American Hockey League (AHL), the minor league team for the St. Louis Blues in August 2014.

In June 2016, he was hired as an assistant coach of the Tucson Roadrunners.

== TV appearances and radio broadcasts ==
As an invited guest hockey analyst for TV appearances and radio broadcasts during the 2014 Stanley Cup Playoffs, Hardy reunited with his former Kings coach Barry Melrose on NHL Network; as a regular analyst during the Western Conference and Stanley Cup Final on NBC Sports LA with Fred Roggin; and appeared on TSN and the Petros & Money Show on Fox Sports Radio.

== International ==
Hardy played for Team Canada at the World Championships in 1986.

== Family ==
Hardy is the son of Olympic figure skater Barbara Wyatt and former ice hockey player Lea Hardy.

== Career statistics ==
=== Regular season and playoffs ===
			Regular season					Playoffs
Season	Team	League	GP	G	A	Pts	PIM	GP	G	A	Pts	PIM
1975–76	Montréal Juniors	QMJHL	64	6	17	23	44	6	1	2	3	0
1976–77	Montréal Juniors	QMJHL	72	20	40	60	137	13	4	5	9	29
1977–78	Montréal Juniors	QMJHL	72	25	57	82	145	13	3	10	13	22
1978–79	Montréal Juniors	QMJHL	67	18	52	70	115	11	5	8	13	40
1979–80	Los Angeles Kings	NHL	15	0	1	1	10	4	1	1	2	9
1979–80	Binghamton Dusters	AHL	56	3	13	16	32	—	—	—	—	—
1980–81	Los Angeles Kings	NHL	77	5	20	25	77	4	1	2	3	4
1981–82	Los Angeles Kings	NHL	77	6	39	45	130	10	1	2	3	9
1982–83	Los Angeles Kings	NHL	74	5	34	39	101	—	—	—	—	—
1983–84	Los Angeles Kings	NHL	79	8	41	49	122	—	—	—	—	—
1984–85	Los Angeles Kings	NHL	78	14	39	53	97	3	0	1	1	2
1985–86	Los Angeles Kings	NHL	55	6	21	27	71	—	—	—	—	—
1986–87	Los Angeles Kings	NHL	73	3	27	30	120	5	1	2	3	10
1987–88	Los Angeles Kings	NHL	61	6	22	28	99	—	—	—	—	—
1987–88	New York Rangers	NHL	19	2	2	4	31	—	—	—	—	—
1988–89	Minnesota North Stars	NHL	15	2	4	6	26	—	—	—	—	—
1988–89	New York Rangers	NHL	45	2	12	14	45	4	0	1	1	31
1989–90	New York Rangers	NHL	54	0	15	15	94	3	0	1	1	2
1990–91	New York Rangers	NHL	70	1	5	6	89	6	0	1	1	30
1991–92	New York Rangers	NHL	52	1	8	9	65	13	0	3	3	31
1992–93	New York Rangers	NHL	44	1	10	11	85	—	—	—	—	—
1992–93	Los Angeles Kings	NHL	11	0	3	3	4	15	1	2	3	30
1993–94	Los Angeles Kings	NHL	16	0	3	3	27	—	—	—	—	—
1993–94	Phoenix Roadrunners	IHL	54	5	3	8	48	—	—	—	—	—
1994–95	Detroit Vipers	IHL	41	6	21	27	35	5	1	1	2	7
1995–96	Los Angeles Ice Dogs	IHL	69	4	18	22	128	—	—	—	—	—
1995–96	Detroit Vipers	IHL	10	0	4	4	8	12	1	1	2	16
1997–98	Long Beach Ice Dogs	IHL	25	3	6	9	10	17	2	3	5	34
NHL totals			915	62	306	368	1293	67	5	16	21	158

=== International ===
Year	Team	Event	GP	G	A	Pts	PIM
1986	Canada	WC	10	3	2	5	12
