= Shawn McCosh =

Canadian ice hockey player (born 1969)

- Born: June 5, 1969 (age 56) Oshawa, Ontario, Canada
- Height: 6 ft 0 in (183 cm)
- Weight: 190 lb (86 kg; 13 st 8 lb)
- Position: Centre
- Shot: Left
- Played for: Los Angeles Kings; New York Rangers
- National team: Canada
- NHL draft: 95th overall, 1989; Detroit Red Wings
- Playing career: 1990–2000

Shawn M. McCosh (born June 5, 1969) is a Canadian former professional ice hockey player. He played in 9 NHL games with the Los Angeles Kings and New York Rangers over parts of two seasons.

After retiring from hockey, McCosh moved to Phoenix, Arizona and became a middle school history teacher at Mountain Sky Junior High.

== Career statistics ==
			Regular season					Playoffs
Season	Team	League	GP	G	A	Pts	PIM	GP	G	A	Pts	PIM
1986–87	Hamilton Steelhawks	OHL	50	11	17	28	49	6	1	0	1	2
1987–88	Hamilton Steelhawks	OHL	64	17	36	53	96	14	6	8	14	14
1988–89	Niagara Falls Thunder	OHL	56	41	62	103	75	14	4	13	17	23
1989–90	Niagara Falls Thunder	OHL	9	6	10	16	24	—	—	—	—	—
1989–90	Dukes of Hamilton	OHL	39	24	28	52	65	—	—	—	—	—
1990–91	New Haven Nighthawks	AHL	66	16	21	37	104	—	—	—	—	—
1991–92	Los Angeles Kings	NHL	4	0	0	0	4	—	—	—	—	—
1991–92	Phoenix Roadrunners	IHL	71	21	32	53	118	—	—	—	—	—
1991–92	New Haven Nighthawks	AHL	—	—	—	—	—	5	0	1	1	0
1992–93	Phoenix Roadrunners	IHL	22	9	8	17	36	—	—	—	—	—
1992–93	New Haven Senators	AHL	46	22	32	54	54	—	—	—	—	—
1993–94	Binghamton Rangers	AHL	75	31	44	75	68	—	—	—	—	—
1994–95	New York Rangers	NHL	5	1	0	1	2	—	—	—	—	—
1994–95	Binghamton Rangers	AHL	67	23	60	83	73	8	3	9	12	6
1995–96	Hershey Bears	AHL	71	31	52	83	82	5	1	5	6	8
1996–97	Philadelphia Phantoms	AHL	79	30	51	81	110	10	3	9	12	23
1997–98	Philadelphia Phantoms	AHL	80	24	54	78	102	20	6	13	19	14
1998–99	Philadelphia Phantoms	AHL	38	12	25	37	43	—	—	—	—	—
1998–99	Michigan K-Wings	IHL	12	4	9	13	18	5	1	2	3	6
1999–00	Adler Mannheim	DEL	53	11	11	22	93	5	0	0	0	4
NHL totals			9	1	0	1	6	—	—	—	—	—
AHL totals			522	189	339	528	636	48	13	37	50	51
