= Marc Fortier =

Canadian ice hockey player

- Born: February 26, 1966 (age 59) Sherbrooke, Quebec, Canada
- Height: 5 ft 10 in (178 cm)
- Weight: 202 lb (92 kg; 14 st 6 lb)
- Position: Centre
- Shot: Right
- Played for: Quebec Nordiques; Ottawa Senators; Los Angeles Kings
- NHL draft: Undrafted
- Playing career: 1987–2005

Marc Fortier (born February 26, 1966) is a Canadian former professional ice hockey centre. Fortier played in the National Hockey League for the Quebec Nordiques, Ottawa Senators and Los Angeles Kings.

== Biography ==
Fortier was raised in Windsor, Quebec. As a youth, he played in the 1978 Quebec International Pee-Wee Hockey Tournament with a minor ice hockey team from Windsor.

Fortier first played four years in the QMJHL for the Chicoutimi Saguenéens. In his last season, he had a total of 201 points which is a record in team history. Afterwards, he played in the NHL, AHL and IHL. From 1994 to 2005, Fortier played in Europe, playing in the Deutsche Eishockey Liga in Germany and in Switzerland in Nationalliga A and Nationalliga B. Fortier played a total of 212 regular season games, scoring 42 goals and 102 points with 135 penalty minutes.

Fortier has been the coach and general manager of the Saint-Georges CRS Express of the Ligue Nord-Américaine de Hockey. He was a QMJHL scout for the Colorado Avalanche in the 2008–2009 season. In 2010, he served the recruitment director of the Quebec Major Junior Hockey League. He was the general manager of his former junior team, the Chicoutimi Saguenéens, from 2011 to 2014.

== Career statistics ==
			Regular season					Playoffs
Season	Team	League	GP	G	A	Pts	PIM	GP	G	A	Pts	PIM
1981–82	Cantons de L'Est Cantonniers	QMAAA	6	1	2	3	0	14	2	0	2	0
1982–83	Cantons de L'Est Cantonniers	QMAAA	48	35	36	71	74	3	0	1	1	6
1983–84	Chicoutimi Saguenéens	QMJHL	67	16	30	46	51	—	—	—	—	—
1984–85	Chicoutimi Saguenéens	QMJHL	68	35	63	98	114	14	8	4	12	16
1985–86	Chicoutimi Saguenéens	QMJHL	71	47	86	133	49	9	2	14	16	12
1986–87	Chicoutimi Saguenéens	QMJHL	65	66	135	201	39	19	11	40	51	20
1987–88	Fredericton Express	AHL	50	26	36	62	48	—	—	—	—	—
1987–88	Quebec Nordiques	NHL	27	4	10	14	12	—	—	—	—	—
1988–89	Halifax Citadels	AHL	16	11	11	22	14	—	—	—	—	—
1988–89	Quebec Nordiques	NHL	57	20	19	39	45	—	—	—	—	—
1989–90	Halifax Citadels	AHL	15	5	6	11	6	—	—	—	—	—
1989–90	Quebec Nordiques	NHL	59	13	17	30	28	—	—	—	—	—
1990–91	Halifax Citadels	AHL	58	24	32	56	85	—	—	—	—	—
1990–91	Quebec Nordiques	NHL	14	0	4	4	6	—	—	—	—	—
1991–92	Halifax Citadels	AHL	16	9	16	25	44	—	—	—	—	—
1991–92	Quebec Nordiques	NHL	39	5	9	14	33	—	—	—	—	—-
1992–93	Ottawa Senators	NHL	10	0	1	1	6	—	—	—	—	—
1992–93	New Haven Senators	AHL	16	9	15	24	42	—	—	—	—	—
1992–93	Los Angeles Kings	NHL	6	0	0	0	5	—	—	—	—	—
1992–93	Phoenix Roadrunners	IHL	17	4	9	13	34	—	—	—	—	—
1993–94	Phoenix Roadrunners	IHL	81	39	61	100	96	—	—	—	—	—
1994–95	Canada	Intl	4	1	3	4	0	—	—	—	—	—
1994–95	Zürcher SC	NDA	35	11	40	51	104	5	2	6	8	2
1995–96	Zürcher SC	NDA	36	17	38	55	30	4	1	2	3	4
1996–97	Zürcher SC	NDA	24	8	19	27	39	—	—	—	—	—
1996–97	Eisbären Berlin	DEL	18	3	8	11	10	8	4	4	8	2
1997–98	Eisbären Berlin	DEL	43	8	37	45	40	10	2	5	7	6
1998–99	Eisbären Berlin	DEL	49	8	40	48	86	8	3	2	5	15
1999–2000	Eisbären Berlin	DEL	53	8	39	47	70	—	—	—	—	—
2000–01	Eisbären Berlin	DEL	49	13	39	52	30	—	—	—	—	—
2001–02	Eisbären Berlin	DEL	58	20	37	57	54	4	4	2	6	2
2002–03	Frankfurt Lions	DEL	52	9	40	49	22	—	—	—	—	—
2003–04	HC Ajoie	CHE.2	44	22	48	70	50	11	3	11	14	14
2004–05	HC Ajoie	CHE.2	27	5	16	21	46	—	—	—	—	—
2004–05	HC Fribourg-Gottéron	NLA	4	0	1	1	0	—	—	—	—	—
2006–07	Lac-Mégantic Turmel	PSHL	5	5	18	23	4	10	10	10	20	6
NHL totals			212	42	60	102	135	—	—	—	—	—
AHL totals			171	84	116	200	239	—	—	—	—	—
DEL totals			323	69	240	309	312	30	13	13	26	25

== Coaching statistics ==
Coaching statistics.

Season  Team                    Lge  Type       GP  W  L T OTL    Pct Result 
2005-06 St. Georges CRS Express LNAH Head Coach 56 24 29 0   3  0.455 Out of Playoffs
2007-08 Québec Assur-Expert  LHJAAAQ Head Coach 54                    Semi-Final
