= Trio Grande =

Ice hockey line for the NY Islanders (1970s-1980s)

The Trio Grande was a line of professional ice hockey forwards who played together for the New York Islanders of the National Hockey League from the late 1970s through the early 1980s. The line consisted of Bryan Trottier at center, Clark Gillies at left wing and Mike Bossy at right wing. All three of them are in the Hockey Hall of Fame.

== Background ==
All three members of the Trio Grande were highly regarded as amateur players. In the 1974 NHL entry draft, the Islanders selected Clark Gillies fourth overall and Bryan Trottier 22nd overall. They selected Mike Bossy 15th overall in the 1977 NHL entry draft. Gillies made the Islanders roster that season, while Trottier spent another year in the Western Hockey League before joining the Islanders in 1975–76, winning the Calder Memorial Trophy as Rookie of the Year and participating in the NHL All-Star Game.

== Formation ==
The Trio Grande emerged in the 1977 season. Bossy's play led Islanders' coach Al Arbour to break up his former top line of Trottier, Gillies and Billy Harris in training camp, inserting Bossy, as a rookie. The results were immediate, as Trottier emerged as a points leader, Bossy emerged as a league's leading goal scorer, while Gillies, the team captain and a larger presence than Trottier and Bossy, served as an aggressor, as well as a scorer. Bossy won the Calder Trophy that season. Gillies, at the time 23, was the oldest of the three.

== Playoff success ==
It'd be Clark Gillies on the left and Mike Bossy, the purest goal scorer in the history of the game on the right. And Clark and I were kind of like chuckling because here we are playing with Mike Bossy, who just scored at will, basically, you know, he could score any which way... you give him the puck. And that's what we did. We found a way to get him the puck. And, you know, Clark was basically our big brother on the ice. You know, no one bothered us. We didn't have to worry about people knocking our blocks off. There was a price to pay. And he was a big presence for us and we needed that. And he was a high skilled player. He could score. He was powerful. He was the epitome of the power forward of our generation. You know, he could skate. He could fight, he could scrap. He was just a great leader in that regard. So for me, just a give and go guy, I can put the left leg, moved to the right, go to the net, get maybe a rebound, you know, go back to centre ice and pat my players on the back for scoring a pretty goal. But you know, I like to punch in a couple of goals myself, but really what made it was a chemistry and a friendship and a bond and we all cared about each other. We all wanted to win.

— Bryan Trottier

The Islanders had made the playoffs the three seasons prior to the formation of the Trio Grande but had not gotten past the Semifinals. In 1977–78, the Islanders won their first Patrick Division championship but lost in seven games to the Toronto Maple Leafs the Quarterfinals. In 1978–79, the Islanders repeated as Patrick Division champions, but lost in the Semifinals in six games to the New York Rangers.

Following the disappointments of the prior two seasons, Gillies, believing the captaincy was harming his game, resigned as captain and was succeeded by Denis Potvin prior to the 1979–80 season.

The Islanders won their first of four consecutive Stanley Cups in 1979–80, with Trottier winning the Conn Smythe Trophy as MVP of the playoffs in 1980 and Bossy winning the Conn Smythe Trophy in 1982, scoring seven goals in the four-game series against the Vancouver Canucks. The Islanders also made the Stanley Cup Final in 1984, losing to the Edmonton Oilers. Bossy had scored eight goals after the first three rounds of the playoffs (and 17 goals in the past three consecutive post-seasons), but was silenced completely in the Final series.

== Post-dynasty ==
The Islanders returned to the playoffs in 1984–85 and 1985–86, losing in the Division Finals and Division Semifinals, respectively. Following the 1985–86 season, during which his scoring output decreased significantly, Gillies was waived by the Islanders and acquired by the Buffalo Sabres. Bossy experienced a severe back injury, which forced him to retire following the 1986–87 season. Trottier would remain with the Islanders until being released after the 1989–90 NHL season, before signing with the Pittsburgh Penguins, where he would win two more Stanley Cup championships in 1991 and 1992. Both Gillies and Bossy later died in 2022 from cancer. Gillies died on January 21, while Bossy on April 14, leaving Trottier as the only surviving member.

== Personal achievements ==
In the 1978–79 season, Trottier scored 134 points to earn the Art Ross Trophy, as well as the Hart Memorial Trophy as league MVP. In 1980–81, Bossy scored 50 goals in the first 50 games of the season, the first achieve this milestone since Maurice Richard. Bossy also won the Lady Byng Memorial Trophy in 1982–83 NHL season, 1983–84 and 1985–86.

The three members of the Trio Grande made the NHL All-Star team in 1977–78 and 1978–79, with Trottier and Gillies making the First Team and Bossy making the Second Team, beaten out by Guy Lafleur both years. Bossy would make the First Team in 1980–81, 1982–83, 1983–84, and 1985–86. Bossy also made the Second Team in 1984–85, and Trottier was named to the Second Team in 1981–82 and 1983–84.

All three members of the Trio Grande were named to the 1978 NHL All Star Game. Bossy and Trottier were both named to the 1980, 1982, 1983, 1985, and 1986 All Star Games. In addition, Bossy was named to the All Star Game in 1981.

Bossy still holds the team records for most goals in a season (69 goals in 1978–79) and most points in a season (147 points in 1981–82). Trottier holds the team record for most assists in a season (87 assists in 1978–79) as well as most games played as an Islander (1,129).

All three have had their numbers retired by the Islanders, and all three have been inducted into the Hockey Hall of Fame. Bossy was inducted in 1991, Trottier in 1997, and Gillies in 2002.

== See also ==
- List of ice hockey linemates
