= Butch Goring =

Canadian ice hockey player and coach (born 1949)

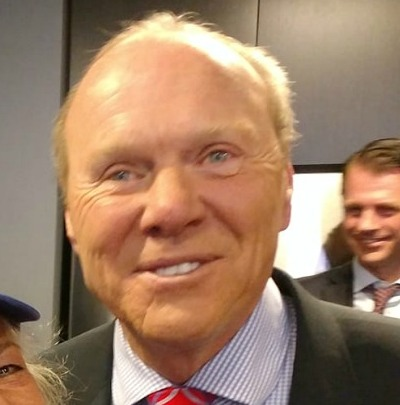
- Goring in 2018
- Born: October 22, 1949 (age 77) Winnipeg, Manitoba, Canada
- Height: 5 ft 9 in (175 cm)
- Weight: 170 lb (77 kg; 12 st 2 lb)
- Position: Centre
- Shot: Left
- Played for: Los Angeles Kings; New York Islanders; Boston Bruins
- National team: Canada
- NHL draft: 51st overall, 1969; Los Angeles Kings
- Playing career: 1969–1987

Robert Thomas "Butch" Goring (born October 22, 1949) is a Canadian former professional ice hockey player and coach. He played 16 seasons in the National Hockey League (NHL) for the Los Angeles Kings, New York Islanders and Boston Bruins. A four-time Stanley Cup winner with the Islanders, he has been cited as a key figure of the Islanders dynasty.

Since retiring as a player, he has served as head coach of both the Bruins and Islanders. Since 2023 he serves as the Islanders' television colour commentator on MSG Network and select games for TNT alongside play-by-play announcer Brendan Burke. In addition, ice-level reporter Darren Pang joins the pair for select games.

== Early life ==
Goring was born on October 22, 1949, in Winnipeg, Manitoba, Canada, to Bob and Audree. He was raised in St. Boniface, Winnipeg, alongside his twin sister and two brothers. Goring is of Scottish and English descent through his parents. His father Bob was a welder for the Canadian National Railway. Growing up, Goring was a fan of the Detroit Red Wings and wore the jersey number 9 in honour of Gordie Howe.

== Playing career ==
=== Junior ===
Growing up in Winnipeg, Goring played junior ice hockey with the Winnipeg Rangers and Winnipeg Jets of the Manitoba Junior Hockey League (MJHL). In his rookie season with the Rangers, Goring scored 66 points and received the 1967 Lorne "Windy" Lyndon Memorial trophy as the MJHL's most sportsmanlike player. He also had a one game trial with Canada's national team against the Manitoba Senior League All-Stars. The following season, Goring played on the Hull Nationals in the Quebec Provincial Senior Hockey League with future NHLer Bob Berry. He finished the 1968–69 season leading the team in scoring before being recruited to join the Western Hockey League's Winnipeg Jets. While it was rumoured that the Jets offered Goring a car in exchange for his signing, team owner Benny Hatskin denied it. By December 1968, Goring ranked third in league scoring with 33 points and second in goals. He left the team in February 1969 to join the Dauphin Kings of the MJHL due to his unhappiness with the team's operations. After finishing his junior career, Goring was drafted by the Los Angeles Kings in the fifth round (51st overall) of the 1969 NHL amateur draft.

=== Professional career ===
==== Los Angeles Kings organization (1969–1980) ====
Following the draft, Goring was assigned to the Kings' American Hockey League (AHL) affiliate, the Springfield Kings, for the 1969–70 season. Goring found immediate success in the AHL while playing alongside Mike Corrigan and Randy Miller, and the trio combined to become Springfield's highest scoring line. As a result of his early success, Goring was considered an early candidate for the Rookie of the Year. By the end of November 1969, Goring had scored 13 goals and seven assists through 19 games. Due to the Los Angeles Kings' offensive struggles, Goring and Corrigan were recalled to the NHL level on November 26, and placed on a line with veteran Eddie Shack. While on this line, Goring scored his first NHL goal on November 30, against the Detroit Red Wings. Goring continued to play alongside Shack through the remainer of the season, although Corrigan was eventually replaced by Ross Lonsberry.

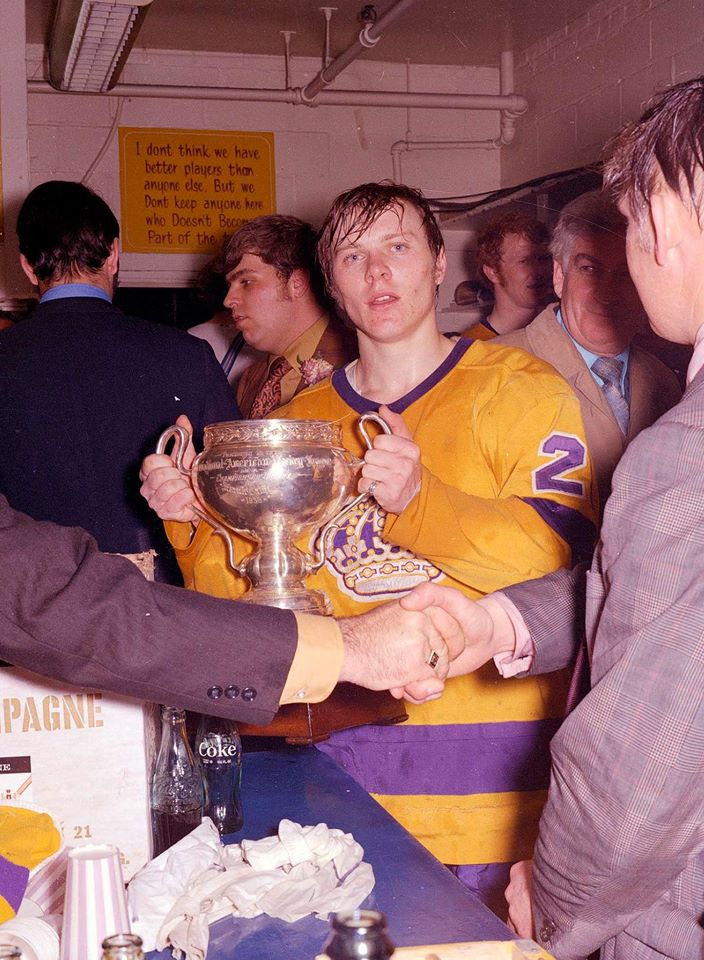
Goring with the 1971 Calder Cup.

Goring returned to the Kings' training camp ahead of the 1970–71 season, but struggled to keep up with his teammates. He also arrived at camp eight pounds underweight and complained of feeling lathargic. Following a series of tests, Goring was admitted to Daniel Freeman Memorial Hospital with mononucleosis and mild hepatitis. In November 1970, Goring was reassigned to the Springfield Kings and moved in with the team's physician while he rebuilt his strength. Upon returning to Springfield's lineup, Goring scored eight goals and 15 assists before being recalled to the NHL level in early January 1971 as a replacement for an injured player. He recorded two goals and five assists through 19 games but was reassigned to Springfield once Bob Pulford returned to the lineup. Goring finished the 1970–71 season with the Springfield Kings and scored the game-winning goal to help them qualify for the 1971 Calder Cup playoffs. During the final round, Goring tied Jean-Guy Gendron's record for most points in the playoffs after recording a hat-trick in game 3. He finished the Calder Cup playoffs with a record-setting 11 goals and 25 points to lead the Kings to the Calder Cup championship.

As he was fully recovered from mononucleosis, Goring returned to the Los Angeles Kings for the 1971–72 NHL season. However, he was often sidelined in favour of team veterans by new head coach Fred Glover. At the end of November 1971, Glover put Goring on a line between Lucien Grenier and Mike Corrigan and the team won two of their next three games. Goring had previously played alongside Corrigan in Springfield. As the three continued to play together through December, they earned the moniker of the "Light Brigade" because their heaviest member weighed 175 pounds. Grenier was later replaced by Bob Berry and the three became the Kings' top scoring line. On February 5, 1972, Goring set a franchise record by recording two goals and four assists in the Kings' 8–1 win over the Pittsburgh Penguins. Through the final 11 games in February, Goring's line combined for 15 goals and 23 assists. Goring scored his first NHL hat-trick in the Kings' final game of the season on April 1, against the California Golden Seals to finish the season with 21 goals.

In the 1976 Stanley Cup playoff quarterfinals series against the Boston Bruins, Goring scored the overtime game-winning goal in games 2 and 6. He won both the Bill Masterton Trophy and the Lady Byng Memorial Trophy in 1977–78, becoming the first player to win both trophies the same year. Prior to the 1978–79 season, he was offered a five-year, $1 million contract by the World Hockey Association's Edmonton Oilers. However, Goring re-signed with the Kings after they countered with an offer of $1.25-million over the same term.

==== New York Islanders (1980–1985) ====
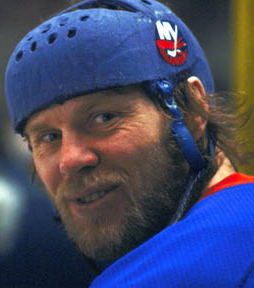
Goring with the Islanders in the 1980s.

In the 1979–80 season, Goring was traded on March 10, 1980 (the day before the trade deadline), to the New York Islanders in exchange for Billy Harris and Dave Lewis, and was widely regarded as being the "final piece of the puzzle". After Goring joined the team, the Islanders went unbeaten for the rest of the season, and finished second in the Patrick Division. The acquisition of Goring made splitting up the Trio Grande line more workable, as Clark Gillies went with him, while Mike Bossy and Bryan Trottier were joined on the second line by Bob Bourne, and the Islanders' attack became more balanced. Goring then scored 19 points in 21 playoff games to help the Islanders to the first of four consecutive Stanley Cups.

The next season, he improved upon his previous playoff run, recording 10 goals and 10 assists in 20 playoff games, and was awarded the Conn Smythe Trophy as the playoff most valuable player, as the Islanders won their second Cup.

Goring played 78 games and did not receive a single penalty, but did not win the Lady Byng Trophy that year.

==== Final years (1985–1987) ====
Goring's final NHL season was in 1984–85. After his release by the Islanders, he played effectively for half a season with the Boston Bruins, before retiring and becoming the Bruins' head coach for a season and a half. After he was fired as the Bruins' coach in 1986–87, he played briefly for the Nova Scotia Oilers of the AHL before retiring for good.

Goring retired having played 1107 games, with 375 goals and 513 assists for 888 points. He recorded only 102 penalty minutes, the lowest total in NHL history for a player appearing in more than a 1,000 games. He was a very effective penalty-killer throughout his career as he finished in the top 10 for short-handed goals nine seasons in his career amassing a career total of 40 short-handed goals, the fifth most of all-time.

== Legacy ==
Goring was most recognizable on the ice for the Sven Tumba-endorsed Spaps brand helmet that he had worn since childhood and continued to wear throughout his entire professional career.

Former Islanders' teammate Mike Bossy stated in a 2010 episode of Off the Record with Michael Landsberg that Goring is quite likely the originator of the NHL's tradition of growing a beard in the Stanley Cup playoffs, commonly called a "playoff beard". Other former Islanders, including Dave Lewis and Clark Gillies, point to the tradition starting in the mid-1970s, before Goring's time with the team, although Goring certainly participated in the tradition once he joined the Islanders.

Goring's number 91 was retired by the Islanders on February 29, 2020, ahead of a game against the Boston Bruins.

== Career statistics ==
=== Regular season and playoffs ===
| Team | | | Regular season | | | | | Playoffs |
| Season | Team | League | GP | G | A | Pts | PIM | GP | G | A | Pts | PIM |
|---|---|---|---|---|---|---|---|---|---|---|---|---|
| 1965–66 | Winnipeg Rangers | MJHL | 3 | 0 | 0 | 0 | 0 | 3 | 0 | 1 | 1 | 0 |
| 1966–67 | Winnipeg Rangers | MJHL | 51 | 35 | 31 | 66 | 2 | 8 | 2 | 6 | 8 | 0 |
| 1967–68 | Hull Nationals | Que-Sr. | 40 | 16 | 41 | 57 | 4 | — | — | — | — | — |
| 1967–68 | Winnipeg Jets | MJHL | — | — | — | — | — | 1 | 2 | 1 | 3 | 0 |
| 1967–68 | St. Boniface Mohawks | AC | — | — | — | — | — | 12 | 5 | 6 | 11 | 2 |
| 1968–69 | Winnipeg Jets | WCHL | 39 | 42 | 33 | 75 | 0 | — | — | — | — | — |
| 1968–69 | Dauphin Kings | MC | — | — | — | — | — | 12 | 8 | 8 | 16 | 5 |
| 1968–69 | Regina Pats | MC | — | — | — | — | — | 2 | 2 | 3 | 5 | 0 |
| 1969–70 | Los Angeles Kings | NHL | 59 | 13 | 23 | 36 | 8 | — | — | — | — | — |
| 1969–70 | Springfield Kings | AHL | 19 | 13 | 7 | 20 | 0 | — | — | — | — | — |
| 1970–71 | Los Angeles Kings | NHL | 19 | 2 | 5 | 7 | 2 | — | — | — | — | — |
| 1970–71 | Springfield Kings | AHL | 40 | 23 | 32 | 55 | 4 | 12 | 11 | 14 | 25 | 0 |
| 1971–72 | Los Angeles Kings | NHL | 74 | 21 | 29 | 50 | 2 | — | — | — | — | — |
| 1972–73 | Los Angeles Kings | NHL | 67 | 28 | 31 | 59 | 2 | — | — | — | — | — |
| 1973–74 | Los Angeles Kings | NHL | 70 | 28 | 33 | 61 | 2 | 5 | 0 | 1 | 1 | 0 |
| 1974–75 | Los Angeles Kings | NHL | 60 | 27 | 33 | 60 | 6 | 3 | 0 | 0 | 0 | 0 |
| 1975–76 | Los Angeles Kings | NHL | 80 | 33 | 40 | 73 | 8 | 9 | 2 | 3 | 5 | 4 |
| 1976–77 | Los Angeles Kings | NHL | 78 | 30 | 55 | 85 | 6 | 9 | 7 | 5 | 12 | 0 |
| 1977–78 | Los Angeles Kings | NHL | 80 | 37 | 36 | 73 | 2 | 2 | 0 | 0 | 0 | 2 |
| 1978–79 | Los Angeles Kings | NHL | 80 | 36 | 51 | 87 | 16 | 2 | 0 | 0 | 0 | 0 |
| 1979–80 | Los Angeles Kings | NHL | 69 | 20 | 48 | 68 | 12 | — | — | — | — | — |
| 1979–80 | New York Islanders | NHL | 12 | 6 | 5 | 11 | 2 | 21 | 7 | 12 | 19 | 2 |
| 1980–81 | New York Islanders | NHL | 78 | 23 | 37 | 60 | 0 | 18 | 10 | 10 | 20 | 6 |
| 1981–82 | New York Islanders | NHL | 67 | 15 | 17 | 32 | 10 | 19 | 6 | 5 | 11 | 12 |
| 1982–83 | New York Islanders | NHL | 75 | 19 | 20 | 39 | 8 | 20 | 4 | 8 | 12 | 4 |
| 1983–84 | New York Islanders | NHL | 71 | 22 | 24 | 46 | 8 | 21 | 1 | 5 | 6 | 2 |
| 1984–85 | New York Islanders | NHL | 29 | 2 | 5 | 7 | 2 | — | — | — | — | — |
| 1984–85 | Boston Bruins | NHL | 39 | 13 | 21 | 34 | 6 | 5 | 1 | 1 | 2 | 0 |
| 1986–87 | Nova Scotia Oilers | AHL | 10 | 3 | 5 | 8 | 2 | — | — | — | — | — |
| NHL totals | | | 1,107 | 375 | 513 | 888 | 102 | 134 | 38 | 50 | 88 | 32 |

=== International ===
| Year | Team | Event | GP | G | A | Pts | PIM |
|---|---|---|---|---|---|---|---|
| 1981 | Canada | CC | 7 | 3 | 2 | 5 | 4 |

== Coaching career ==
Goring served two stints as an NHL head coach. He coached the Bruins in the 1985–86 season and the early part of the following campaign; he also coached the New York Islanders in the 1999–2000 season and most of the following season – he was fired by the Islanders on March 4, 2001. He also served as the head coach for several minor league teams, including the Spokane Chiefs Capital District Islanders, Las Vegas Thunder, Denver Grizzlies, Utah Grizzlies, and Anchorage Aces, winning two championships. In 2002–2003, after a short stint as head coach of the Frankfurt Lions of the Deutsche Eishockey Liga where he replaced Doug Bradley, he took over the Krefeld Penguins and led them to their first championship since 1952. In 2004–2005, he was the coach of the DEG Metro Stars hockey team in Germany.

== Head coaching record ==
| Team | Year | Regular season | | | | | | | Postseason | | | |
| Team | Year | G | W | L | T | OTL | Pts | Finish | W | L | Win% | Result |
|---|---|---|---|---|---|---|---|---|---|---|---|---|
| BOS | 1985–86 | 80 | 37 | 31 | 12 | — | 86 | 3rd in Adams | 0 | 3 | .000 | Lost in division semifinals |
| BOS | 1986–87 | 13 | 5 | 7 | 1 | — | (11) | (fired) | — | — | — | — |
| NYI | 1999–2000 | 82 | 24 | 48 | 9 | 1 | 58 | 5th in Atlantic | — | — | — | Missed playoffs |
| NYI | 2000–01 | 65 | 17 | 40 | 5 | 3 | (52) | (fired) | — | — | — | — |
| Total | | 240 | 83 | 126 | 27 | 4 | 193 | | 0 | 3 | .000 | 1 playoff appearance |

== Career achievements ==
- MJHL Hockey Ability and Sportsmanship Award winner (1967)
- Turnbull Cup (MJHL championship) (1969)
- Calder Cup (AHL championship) (1971)
- Bill Masterton Trophy winner (1978)
- Lady Byng Trophy winner (1978)
- Played in NHL All-Star Game (1980)
- Conn Smythe Trophy winner (1981)
- Stanley Cup champion (1980, 1981, 1982, 1983)
- Played in the Canada Cup Tournament for Team Canada (1981)
- Named Manitoba's Athlete of the Year (1981)
- IHL Coach of Year (1995 and 1996)
- Turner Cup (IHL) Championships (1995 and 1996)
- The last active player that had played during the 1960s
- Inducted into the Manitoba Sports Hall of Fame and Museum in 1992
- "Honoured Member" of the Manitoba Hockey Hall of Fame
- Jersey number 91 retired by the New York Islanders organization (2020)

== See also ==
- List of NHL players with 1,000 games played

Awards and achievements
| Preceded by Marcel Dionne | Winner of the Lady Byng Memorial Trophy; 1978 | Succeeded by Bob MacMillan |
| Preceded by Ed Westfall | Winner of the Bill Masterton Memorial Trophy; 1978 | Succeeded by Serge Savard |
| Preceded by Bryan Trottier | Winner of the Conn Smythe Trophy; 1981 | Succeeded by Mike Bossy |
Sporting positions
| Preceded by Harry Sinden | Head coach of the Boston Bruins; 1985–1986 | Succeeded by Terry O'Reilly |
| Preceded by Bill Stewart | Head coach of the New York Islanders; 1999–2001 | Succeeded by Lorne Henning |
