= Mike Bossy =

Canadian ice hockey player (1957–2022)

- Hockey Hall of Fame, 1991
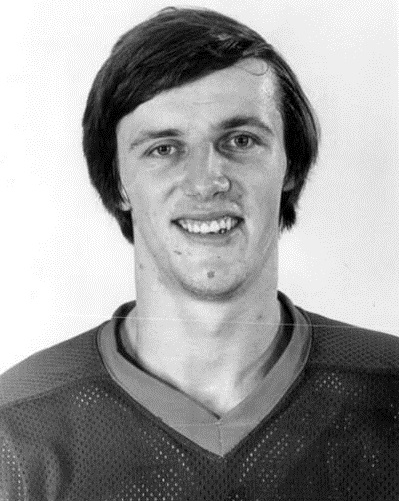
- Bossy with the New York Islanders in 1978
- Born: January 22, 1957 Montreal, Quebec, Canada
- Died: April 15, 2022 (aged 65) Rosemère, Quebec, Canada
- Height: 6 ft 0 in (183 cm)
- Weight: 185 lb (84 kg; 13 st 3 lb)
- Position: Right wing
- Shot: Right
- Played for: New York Islanders
- National team: Canada
- NHL draft: 15th overall, 1977; New York Islanders
- WHA draft: 44th overall, 1977; Indianapolis Racers
- Playing career: 1977–1987

Michael Dean Bossy (January 22, 1957 – April 15, 2022) was a Canadian professional ice hockey player with the New York Islanders of the National Hockey League (NHL). He spent his entire NHL career, which lasted from 1977 to 1987, with the Islanders, and was a crucial part of their four consecutive Stanley Cup championships in the early 1980s.

Bossy won the Calder Memorial Trophy in 1978 as NHL rookie of the year when he set the then-record for most goals by a rookie with 53. He won the Conn Smythe Trophy in the 1982 Stanley Cup playoffs as the most valuable player and the Lady Byng Trophy for combining high quality play with sportsmanship three times. He led the NHL in goals twice and was second three other times. Bossy was voted to the league's first all-star team as right wing five times, with three further selections to the second all-star team. He is one of two players (Jack Darragh being the other) to score consecutive Stanley Cup-winning goals (1982 and 1983) and the only player to record four game-winning goals in one playoff series (1983 Conference Final).

Bossy is the NHL's all-time leader in average goals scored per regular season game, holds the NHL's fourth-highest all-time average points scored per regular season game, and is the second of five players to score 50 goals in 50 games, being the first to accomplish this feat 36 years after Maurice Richard. He jointly holds the record for most 50-goal seasons with Wayne Gretzky and Alexander Ovechkin with nine, being the only player of the three whose 50-goal seasons ran consecutively.

Bossy was elected to the Hockey Hall of Fame in 1991, was named one of the 100 Greatest NHL Players in history, and is considered one of the greatest goal scorers in NHL history.

== Early life ==
Bossy was the fifth son among ten children, and grew up in a family of Detroit Red Wings fans in the parish of Saint-Alphonse, in the Ahuntsic-Cartierville area of Montreal. Bossy attended St. Pius X Comprehensive High School and then Laval Catholic High School. His mother Dorothy was English and French-Canadian, and his father Borden, who maintained a backyard ice rink at their apartment building, was Ukrainian. When he was 12 years old, Bossy broke a kneecap while competing in long jump at school, later developing chronic knee problems during his hockey career.

As a youth, Bossy played in the 1969 Quebec International Pee-Wee Hockey Tournament with a minor ice hockey team from Montreal. He started his junior career with the Laval National of the Quebec Major Junior Hockey League at the age of 15. Despite scoring 309 goals in five seasons, he was considered "not rugged enough" and defensively weak by NHL scouts. His total of 532 points remains a QMJHL record, and his 309 goals is the record for all of major junior. Bossy's #17 is retired by the Acadie–Bathurst Titan, the current incarnation of the former Laval franchise.

== Playing career ==
=== Early stardom ===
Bossy, who had averaged 77 goals per season in junior with Laval, was passed over by twelve teams in the 1977 NHL amateur draft, including the New York Rangers and Toronto Maple Leafs, who each passed over him twice. Toronto expected him to hold out for more than they wanted to pay, according to Bossy, while the Rangers opted for highly-ranked Lucien DeBlois and Ron Duguay. Other teams passed for various reasons: the Buffalo Sabres took Ric Seiling, preferring his checking ability, while the Cleveland Barons, who had the fifth overall pick, passed when Bossy's agent Pierre Lacroix gave the Barons inflated salary requirements, prompting them to select Mike Crombeen instead. Scotty Bowman, coach of the Montreal Canadiens, later regretted that Montreal had passed on Bossy; Bowman and his assistant Claude Ruel had each been impressed with Bossy's play – and scoring – in person, but team scouts questioned his toughness and the Canadiens took Mark Napier with their first pick instead.

The New York Islanders picked Bossy with the 15th overall selection. General manager Bill Torrey was torn at first between taking Bossy and Dwight Foster. Bossy was known as a scorer who could not check, while Foster, who had led the Ontario Hockey Association with 143 points, had a defensive aspect to his game. Various stories exist explaining who persuaded Torrey to select Bossy. One common story credits coach Al Arbour, who figured it would be easier to teach a scorer how to check. Another credits Islanders scout Harry Saraceno, while another credits both Arbour and Saraceno.

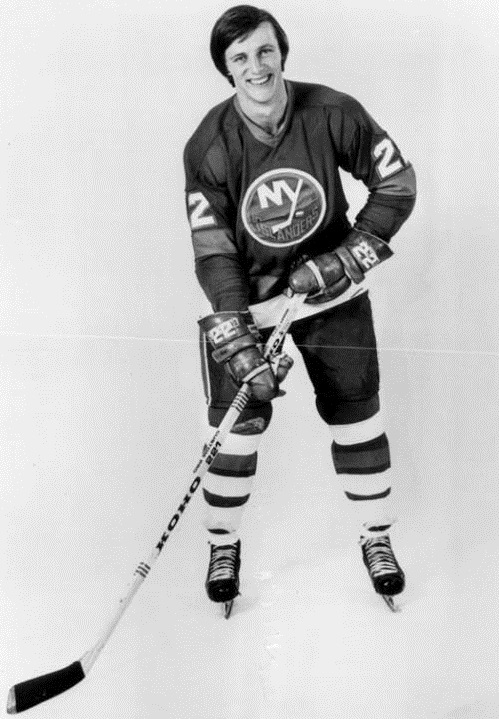
Bossy in 1978

Bossy replaced Billy Harris on the Islanders' top line with Bryan Trottier and Clark Gillies, creating a new combination that came to be known as The Trio Grande. He scored against Don Edwards of the Buffalo Sabres in his first career game, a 3–2 loss to Buffalo on October 13, 1977, and by mid-November already had 11 goals. On February 4, 1978, Bossy collected his first career hat trick in a 6–1 win against the Washington Capitals. On February 25, Bossy scored his 45th goal of the season, to pass the previous rookie record of 44 held by Rick Martin. Bossy had boldly told Bill Torrey before the season he would score 50 goals, and wound up with a total of 53, setting a rookie record which stood until broken by Teemu Selanne in 1993. Bossy additionally led the league with 25 powerplay goals. He won the 1977–78 Calder Memorial Trophy as rookie of the year, and was named a Second Team All-Star, and additionally was named the starting right wing for the Campbell Conference in the 1978 NHL All-Star Game.

Bossy managed two goals and two assists against Toronto in the quarterfinals of the 1978 Playoffs, a hard-fought series in which the Trio Grande was somewhat neutralized by Toronto's toughness. In game 6, with the Maple Leafs trailing in the series 3 games to 2, Bossy was hit from behind by Toronto's Jerry Butler and sent to the hospital with a neck sprain; the Leafs won and forced a seventh game. Bossy returned for game 7 but was held scoreless as Toronto won the game – and the series – in overtime.

In the 1978–79 NHL season, Bossy was again named a Second Team All-Star after leading the league with 69 goals, at the time the second-highest single season total. On December 23, 1978, the members of the Trio Grande combined for 17 points in a 9–4 victory over the Rangers, including two goals and three assists for Bossy; Gillies collected four assists, while Trottier scored five times and picked up three assists. On February 19, 1979, Bossy recorded his 100th goal in his 129th game, becoming the fastest to reach that milestone, and his two-year total of 122 goals was the most by any NHL player over his first two seasons. During the season Bossy represented the NHL All-Stars in the 1979 Challenge Cup against the Soviet Union, scoring against Vladislav Tretiak in the first game of the three-game series. Bossy set an Islanders playoffs record for single-game points with four in a 1979 quarterfinal game against the Chicago Black Hawks. The Islanders swept Chicago in four games and Bossy set another team playoffs mark by collecting five goals over the series, including the overtime winner in game 2. In the semifinals, the Islanders were upset by the Rangers in six games, who targeted the Trio Grande with "honest checking", and kept Bossy from scoring until the final game.

=== Dynasty years ===
Going into the 1979–80 season, Bossy signed a new two-year contract with the Islanders worth $500,000. After finishing in first place the season before, the Islanders got off to their worst start in six years, and in early December were out of a playoff spot, and had a losing record as late as January 9; the Islanders won only 6 of their first 21 games. Coach Al Arbour split up the Trio Grande by shifting Gillies, but while Bossy and Trottier still scored the bulk of the team's goals the remaining lines were ineffectual. Bossy and Trottier scored the only Islander goals in a 5–2 season-opening loss to the Philadelphia Flyers, and Bossy had both goals in their second game, another 5–2 loss, this time to Buffalo. Down 3–0 to Chicago on October 27, Arbour reunited the linemates with explosive results – Trottier recorded a hat trick, and he, Gillies and Bossy all scored in a 49-second span (an Islanders team record) in a 6–4 Islanders victory. Still, the Islanders were giving up goals faster than they could score them – in November, a run of five games in which they had yielded a cumulative 26 goals culminated in a 6–3 loss to the St. Louis Blues in which Bossy, Gillies and Trottier were the only Islanders to put the puck in the net. It took until their 41st game for the Islanders to get over .500, and after acquiring Butch Goring on March 10, the Islanders went unbeaten for the rest of the season, and finished second in the Patrick Division. The acquisition of Goring made splitting up the Trio Grande more workable, as Gillies went with him, while Bob Bourne took Gillies' place on the first line with Trottier and Bossy. At the same time, Bossy's goal output fell to 51, leading him to joke it was a "bad season". Bossy played in the all-star game for the Campbell Conference.

In the 1979–80 Stanley Cup playoffs, Bossy scored one goal in two games in the opening round victory against the Los Angeles Kings. He missed the first three games of the quarterfinals against the Boston Bruins with a hand injury but scored twice when he returned in game 4. In the semifinals against the Sabres, Bossy collected three goals and three assists, as the Islanders advanced to the final round. In the 1980 Stanley Cup Final, with the Islanders up three games to two against the Philadelphia Flyers, Bossy scored a power play goal in the second period of game 6, giving New York a 3–2 lead at the time. After the Flyers tied the game at 4 in the third period, the Islanders won the game – and the Cup – on an overtime goal by Bobby Nystrom. Bossy led all scorers in the Finals with 11 points, and finished second to teammate Trottier in scoring with 23 points as the Islanders won their first Stanley Cup.

In the 1980–81 season, Bossy and Charlie Simmer of the Kings contended to be the first to score 50 goals in 50 games since Maurice Richard 36 years earlier. On January 24, both Bossy and Simmer played their 50th games; Simmer recorded a hat trick in the afternoon to fall just shy at 49. That evening, Bossy scored twice against the Quebec Nordiques in the final five minutes, including the second goal with 89 seconds left, becoming the second to achieve 50 in 50. Richard sent a congratulatory telegram to Bossy. Bossy's season included an NHL-record 9 hat tricks, and he finished the season with 68 goals, and through his first four seasons had the highest goals per game average in NHL history with .785. Bossy was again named a starter for the 1981 All-Star Game, and was named a First Team All-Star at the end of the season.

In the opening round of the 1981 Playoffs, Bossy and Trottier tied for the team lead with 10 points each, as the Islanders swept the Maple Leafs. The Islanders then defeated the Edmonton Oilers in six games, in which Bossy led all scorers with 11 points, and his 21 total points tied him with Edmonton's Wayne Gretzky for the playoff lead. In the semifinals against the Rangers, Bossy scored two power play goals in the final game of a four-game sweep, and finished the series with five goals total. The Islanders then defeated the Minnesota North Stars in the 1981 Stanley Cup Final, as Bossy set records for most points (35), and power-play goals (9) and most goals combining regular season and playoffs (85; 68 regular season plus 17 playoff), and the Islanders won their second Stanley Cup.

Going into the 1981–82 NHL season, Bossy signed a new six-year contract with the Islanders. That season Bossy set records for right-wingers with 83 assists and 147 points, and was +69 on the season. Bossy scored twice in the 1982 NHL All-Star Game, his fourth appearance, to lead the Wales Conference to a 4–2 victory, and was named the game's MVP. A late-season knee injury limited Bossy's mobility in the Islanders' Patrick Division semifinal against the Pittsburgh Penguins, although he still managed to score goals in the first two games. In the Patrick Division final, the Islanders next faced the Rangers, against whom Bossy had scored six goals with nine assists in eight regular season games. Bossy's knee still bothered him, but he scored four goals through the first four games of the series; he also recorded four assists in the series as the Islanders won in six games. In the Wales Conference Final against the Nordiques, Bossy scored twice in game 2, including the game-winner, and twice more in game 3, again totaling eight points in the series as the Islanders swept. Going into the 1982 Stanley Cup Final against the Vancouver Canucks, Vancouver's Tiger Williams, whose intimidation tactics against Bossy dated back to the 1978 playoffs with Toronto, told reporters that the Canucks planned to check Bossy hard. In the opening game, Bossy recorded a hat trick, including tying the game with under five minutes left, and then intercepted a Harold Snepsts clearing attempt to score the winner in overtime. Bossy scored again in game 2 on the power play, as the Islanders took a 6–4 lead. In game 3, an acrobatic backhand goal resulting from a hit by either Williams or Lars Lindgren was the second in a 3–0 Islanders win. Two powerplay goals by Bossy in game 4 included the winner, as New York swept the series for their third Stanley Cup win. In spite of lingering knee issues, Bossy recorded 27 points and a league-leading 17 playoff goals. Bossy scored seven times in the Finals, tying him with Jean Beliveau for most goals in the final round, and won the Conn Smythe Trophy as playoffs MVP.

Bossy became the first to score at least 60 goals in three consecutive seasons in 1982–83, and collected 118 points. At the end of the season, Bossy won the Lady Byng Memorial Trophy for "gentlemanly" play, for a season in which he received only 17 penalty minutes; he was also named a First Team All-Star for the third time. Bossy skated the 1983 NHL Playoffs on the Islanders top line, with Trottier and Anders Kallur; collectively they accounted for 17 Islander goals. In the Patrick Division semifinal against the Washington Capitals, Bossy scored a hat trick in game 4, as the Islanders won the series with a 6–3 victory. In the Wales Conference Final against the Boston Bruins, Bossy scored nine times, including an NHL-record four game-winning goals, as the Islanders advanced to the Finals for the fourth straight year. The nine goals themselves tied a then-modern era record for most in a playoff series, and included the 27th powerplay goal of his playoffs career, which broke another Jean Beliveau record. The Islanders went on to win their fourth straight Stanley Cup by sweeping the Oilers in the 1983 Stanley Cup Final. On May 17, Bossy scored the winning goal in game 4, becoming the second player to score Stanley Cup-winning goals in consecutive years, joining Jack Darragh in 1920 and 1921.

=== Later career ===
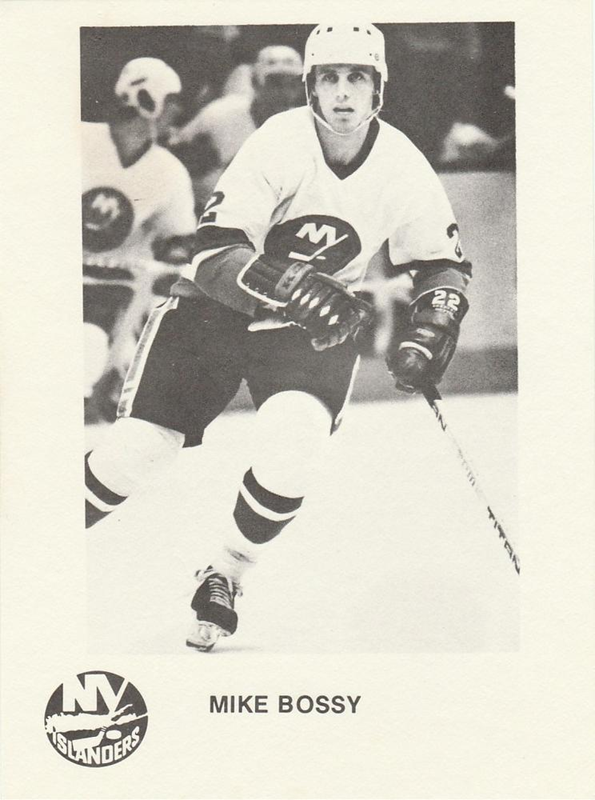
1983 card of Bossy for New York Islanders

As the 1983–84 NHL season got underway, Bossy had five goals in the first three games of the season, before missing six games with a hip injury. Bossy put together a 15-game point streak that ended in early December. He promptly put together a 19-game streak that lasted until mid-January. On January 15, Bossy scored his 400th career regular season goal, the fastest to hit that milestone, doing so in his 506th game, a 4–2 win against the Rangers. Bossy was named to appear in the 1984 NHL All-Star Game, which would have been his sixth consecutive All-Star game, but a collision with Detroit's Dwight Foster resulted in a knee injury and Rick Middleton took his place in the starting lineup; Bossy wound up missing six games with this injury. At the end of the season, Bossy had 51 goals, for his seventh consecutive season with at least 50. Bossy was named a First Team All-Star for the fourth straight year, and again won the Lady Byng Trophy; the Lady Byng Trophy was presented to Bossy at the NHL Awards by Canadian astronaut Marc Garneau.

In the 1984 Stanley Cup playoffs, Bossy scored four times combined in the opening rounds against the Capitals and Rangers, but then equaled that total against the Canadiens, including three game-winners, as the Islanders won their record 19th straight playoff series and advanced to their fifth straight Stanley Cup Final. Bossy missed game 1 of the 1984 Stanley Cup Final, a rematch against the Oilers, with tonsillitis. When he returned, Bossy, who had scored 17 goals in each of the previous three post-seasons, failed to score, and was held without a shot on goal in two of the games, as the Oilers won their first Stanley Cup.

Bossy started the 1984–85 NHL season strong, tying his own team record by scoring in ten consecutive games, and by early November was leading the league with 33 points. By early December, he was scoring at better than a goal per game, with 25 markers in 23 contests. With Trottier missing time with injuries, the team's top line during the first five weeks of the season consisted of Bossy, Brent Sutter and John Tonelli, with that combination providing more than half of the team's offense. After Trottier returned, he took his usual place alongside Bossy, joined with Greg Gilbert, but the Bossy-Tonelli-Sutter combination was resurrected later in the season when the team needed a boost. After 41 games, Bossy was having his best season so far, with 37 goals and 39 assists in that span, as he continued to carry the team. He was selected for the 1985 NHL All-Star Game, his seventh selection overall and the only unanimous choice that year. Bossy finished the season with 58 goals, his eighth consecutive season of 50-goals plus, and earned Second Team All-Star honours, as the Islanders stumbled into the playoffs. In the opening round of the 1985 Stanley Cup playoffs, the Islanders narrowly got past Washington in the opening round, with Bossy assisting on Brent Sutter's game-winning goal. In the second round, the Philadelphia Flyers held Bossy scoreless through the first three games, taking a 3–0 series lead; when Bossy scored in a 6–2 Islanders game 4 victory, it tied Maurice Richard's record for career playoff goals with 82. The Islanders were eliminated in game 5, a 1–0 shutout, as Bossy was held to two shots on goal.

After starting the 1985–86 NHL season with Trottier again, Bossy found himself on continually changing lines throughout the course of the season. By mid-October he had been teamed with Pat LaFontaine and rookie Ari Haanpaa. Al Arbour frequently juggled the lines to spark his team with varying results; reuniting Bossy with Tonelli and Brent Sutter coincided with a Bossy hat trick in a 4–4 tie with Minnesota in November, while Bossy scored the winner in a 7–4 game against the Pittsburgh Penguins after being teamed with Trottier and Mikko Mäkelä. Bossy and Trottier were playing alongside Tonelli in February, connecting on the only goal in a 1–0 victory over Vancouver, but this tandem was itself split up when Tonelli was traded to the Calgary Flames in March for Steve Konroyd and Richard Kromm. The Islanders and Flames faced each other on the same day as the trade, and Bossy scored four goals, while on a line with Kromm and Trottier.

Bossy hit a number of milestones during the course of the season. On January 2, 1986, Bossy became the fastest player to reach 500 goals in NHL history, scoring twice in his 647th game, a 7–5 victory against the Boston Bruins. On January 24, Bossy collected his 1,000th regular season point by assisting on a Trottier goal in a 7–5 win against Washington; a goal in the same game moved Bossy into 10th place at the time on the all-time scoring list. Bossy's four-goal game against Calgary on March 11 included his 50th of the year, making this the record-setting ninth straight season in which he had scored at least 50 goals. Bossy scored his 61st goal in the last game of the season against the New Jersey Devils, completing his record fifth season with at least 60 goals.

In the 1986 NHL All-Star Game, Bossy assisted on Bryan Trottier's overtime game-winning goal in a 4–3 Wales Conference victory. The Islanders did not make it past the opening round of the 1986 Stanley Cup playoffs as they were swept in three games by Washington, but Bossy did set a new all-time record by scoring his 83rd playoff goal. Bossy was named a First Team All-Star and won the Lady Byng Trophy for the third time.

At the beginning of training camp Bossy experienced back pain, and after playing two uncomfortable games in which he did not score, he was ordered to rest for 10 days. The hiatus spanned four games, after which Bossy returned strong, scoring 12 times across 12 games, in addition to recording 9 assists. By Christmas, Bossy had 22 goals but was playing through pain and was not at his usual level, and was undergoing chiropractic treatments and considering taking time off in February. On January 6, playing on a line with Gilbert and Trottier against Minnesota, Bossy scored twice and was still on pace for another 50-goal season. Bossy then missed seven consecutive games in January as the back pain flared up, and doctors were at a loss to determine a diagnosis. It was believed that he was putting undue strain on his back by skating in a manner to take pressure off his right knee, which had required surgery when he was a child; Bossy had broken the kneecap when he was twelve. Bossy was voted to be the starting right wing representing the NHL against the Soviet Union in Rendez-vous '87, the 1987 replacement for the NHL All-Star Game, but ultimately pulled out of the series due to his back problems. Bossy still hoped to record a tenth consecutive 50-goal season, with it still possible as of early February, and had reached 32 by the end of the month. However, by late March it was apparent to Bossy that he would not be reaching the milestone, as the pain increased, and he additionally found himself the target of hits that exploited his condition. In a March 14 game against New Jersey, Bossy scored his 38th goal of the season, which proved to be his last regular season goal, as he finished the season tied with Pat LaFontaine for the team lead. After sitting out the final seven games of the season to rest his back for the 1987 Stanley Cup playoffs, Bossy returned for the opening game of the Patrick Division semifinal against Washington, and scored a powerplay goal. He then suffered an injury to his left knee on a hit from Lou Franceschetti in game 2, and missed the rest of the series, in which the Islanders came back from a three-games-to-one deficit and won the deciding seventh game in quadruple overtime. Bossy returned to the ice in the fourth game of the Patrick Division final against Philadelphia, scoring his 85th career playoffs goal in game 6 as the Islanders again were coming back from a three-to-one deficit, but the Islanders were eliminated with a 5–1 loss in game 7.

Bossy intended to attend training camp in 1987, but with his condition remaining stagnant, and pain preventing him from bending to tie his own skates, Bossy instead underwent a series of tests and x-rays on his back. Doctors eventually concluded that he had two discs in his lower back that were damaged and could not be repaired by surgery, leading Bossy to sit out the 1987–88 season in favour of therapy. During his season off, Bill Torrey had offered to trade Bossy to the Canadiens, so he could be closer to home, but Bossy declined. The Los Angeles Kings acquired Wayne Gretzky in the summer of 1988, and owner Bruce McNall and general manager Rogie Vachon each invited Bossy to sign with the team as a free agent; Bossy declined this offer as well, believing he would not have been able to meet expectations. Bossy officially retired in October 1988, having played his last game at the young age of 30; he scored 573 goals and 553 assists in 752 NHL games, all with the Islanders.

The Islanders retired Bossy's uniform number, No. 22, on March 3, 1992. Bossy was the second Islander afforded that honour after longtime teammate Denis Potvin.

=== Legacy ===
At the end of his shortened playing career, Bossy had impressive numbers. He scored 573 goals and had 553 assists in only 752 games. In 129 playoff games, he had eighty-five goals and seventy-five assists. When he retired, he held the record for most goals per season average with 57.3. While he wanted to be considered a great overall player, he was best known for his impressive scoring output. In Stan Fischler's The All-New Hockey's 100, Bossy says, "About 90 percent of the time I don't aim: I just try to get my shot away as quick as possible as a surprise element. I just try to get the puck on net." Bossy was also noted for his clean play and won the Lady Byng Trophy for gentlemanly play three times: 1983, 1984, and 1986. He spoke out against hockey violence.

Bossy aspired to be the best player of his era but fell short, as the Hart Memorial Trophy and Art Ross Trophy were two of the awards that eluded Bossy during his career, going to Guy Lafleur, Trottier, and Wayne Gretzky. Bossy is frequently compared to Lafleur as they were both considered among the best right-wing snipers, although their styles contrasted as Lafleur was a stylish skater while Bossy was the more accurate shooter.

Although the Islanders swept the Edmonton Oilers in the 1983 final to win a fourth consecutive championship, Gretzky and his Oilers still received the most attention. Bossy harboured some animosity towards Gretzky and the Oilers, stating that the Islanders got little recognition for their dynasty compared to them or the Montreal Canadiens. Bossy complained "I do a lot of promoting for how good [the Islanders] were ... We never got one millionth of the recognition we should. We had a very low-key organization. They didn't want guys doing too much, because they thought the hockey might suffer. People don't talk about us in the first mention of great teams."

== Post-playing career ==
After his playing days were over, Bossy was unable to play hockey or even work out because of his back and knees. Bossy returned to Laval with his family. He went into business with Pierre Lacroix, his agent, and joined Titan, a hockey stick manufacturer, as vice-president. He was also a broadcaster for the Quebec Nordiques. By 1992, in addition to golfing and public speaking, he represented Karhu, Titan's former parent company, and CUMIS, an insurance agency, in public relations positions.

In 1993, Bossy broke into radio, and by 1994, he was part of the "Y'e trop d'bonne heure" (It's too early) morning show on CKOI-FM, a French-language radio station in Montreal. Originally brought on to read the sports, Bossy became known for comic leanings, until he left in 1996. By 1999, Bossy was doing public relations for Humpty Dumpty, and became the Quebec sales director of the company in 2003. He also joined Bobby Orr and Cassie Campbell as ambassadors for Hockey Canada's Chevrolet Safe & Fun Hockey program.

He afterwards recalled not being able to get a job with an NHL organization for over a decade and a half. "I called the Canadiens at least two or three times [in the mid-1990s] because I thought I could help the organization in some way, not necessarily as a coach but in some role that could be developed", Bossy told Sports Illustrated in 2005. "They never called back." When former linemate Bryan Trottier was hired as New York Rangers coach in 2002, Bossy was certain Trottier would hire him on in some capacity. "The reason was," Bossy said, "I remember having umpteen conversations with Bryan, having roomed with him for 10 years, that went, 'One of these days, Mike, we're going to take a team and do it our way.' I've found out since from Bryan [who was fired in his first season] that he wasn't going to be given that chance."

On October 13, 2006, the Islanders announced that Bossy had rejoined the organization, working with the front office in sponsor and fan development.

In September 2014, Bossy joined MSG Networks as a hockey analyst, and in September 2015, he officially joined TVA Sports, an official French-language broadcaster of the NHL in Canada, as a colour commentator. Bossy appeared on the late night show Dave Morissette Live and TVA Sports at 5.

== In popular culture ==
In 1982, Game Plan, Inc. produced a prototype pinball machine named, Mike Bossy the Scoring Machine. Only one unit was made by the company.

At the 1985 All-Star Game, Bossy and other NHL all-stars took part in filming scenes for the music video for "Tears Are Not Enough", a Canadian charity single produced by David Foster, who wanted hockey players to participate as being emblematic of Canada. Bossy said of the experience that his "fantasy is to be a singer".

In 2005, Bossy played himself in Les Boys 4, a sequel in the popular French Canadian Les Boys series. Bossy served as a consultant for The Raccoons on Ice, a hockey-themed special episode of the animated TV series The Raccoons. For most of the episode, the character Cedric Sneer is seen wearing a New York Islanders jersey with the number 22, as an homage to Bossy.

== Accomplishments ==
Bossy holds several Islanders team records, including as the all-time regular season goals leader with 573. He is also the team leader in career playoff goals with 85, and holds the team single-season record for playoff goals, which he achieved in three straight playoffs starting with 1980–81.

As of 2022, Bossy holds or shares the following NHL records:

- Most consecutive 50+ goal seasons: 9
- Most 50+ goal seasons (not necessarily consecutive): 9 (tied with Wayne Gretzky and Alexander Ovechkin)
- Most 60+ goal seasons (not necessarily consecutive): 5 (tied with Wayne Gretzky)
- Highest goals-per-game average, career (minimum 200 total goals): .762 goals per game
- Most power-play goals, one playoff season: 9 (tied with Cam Neely)
- Most consecutive hat tricks: 3 (tied with Joe Malone, who accomplished this twice)

In January 2017, Bossy was named one of the '100 Greatest NHL Players' in history.

Bossy also led the league in goals twice, in 1978–79 and 1980–81 (both predate the Rocket Richard Trophy).

Bossy was inducted into the Hockey Hall of Fame in 1991. His No. 22 sweater was retired by the Islanders on March 3, 1992. In 1997, he was ranked number 20 on The Hockey News' list of the 100 Greatest Hockey Players.

== Personal life and death ==
Bossy met his future wife Lucie Creamer when he was 14, and she was working the snack bar at a rink where he was playing; they were married July 23, 1977. Bossy and his wife had two daughters, Josiane and Tanya, and two grandchildren.

On October 19, 2021, Bossy announced that he had been diagnosed with lung cancer. He died in Rosemère on April 15, 2022, at the age of 65. A week after Bossy's death, Guy Lafleur also succumbed to lung cancer (he and Bossy smoked heavily during their playing days); both Bossy and Lafleur were Quebec natives whose contemporary careers as star right-wingers were often compared.

== Career statistics ==
=== Regular season and playoffs ===
Bold indicates led league

| | | | Regular season | | | | | Playoffs |
| Season | Team | League | GP | G | A | Pts | PIM | GP | G | A | Pts | PIM |
|---|---|---|---|---|---|---|---|---|---|---|---|---|
| 1972–73 | Laval National | QMJHL | 4 | 1 | 2 | 3 | 0 | — | — | — | — | — |
| 1973–74 | Laval National | QMJHL | 68 | 70 | 48 | 118 | 45 | 11 | 6 | 16 | 22 | 2 |
| 1974–75 | Laval National | QMJHL | 67 | **84** | 65 | 149 | 42 | 16 | 18 | 20 | 38 | 2 |
| 1975–76 | Laval National | QMJHL | 64 | 79 | 57 | 136 | 25 | — | — | — | — | — |
| 1976–77 | Laval National | QMJHL | 61 | 75 | 51 | 126 | 12 | 7 | 5 | 5 | 10 | 12 |
| 1977–78 | New York Islanders | NHL | 73 | 53 | 38 | 91 | 6 | 7 | 2 | 2 | 4 | 2 |
| 1978–79 | New York Islanders | NHL | 80 | **69** | 57 | 126 | 25 | 10 | 6 | 2 | 8 | 2 |
| 1979–80 | New York Islanders | NHL | 75 | 51 | 41 | 92 | 12 | 16 | 10 | 13 | 23 | 8 |
| 1980–81 | New York Islanders | NHL | 79 | **68** | 51 | 119 | 32 | 18 | **17** | 18 | 35 | 4 |
| 1981–82 | New York Islanders | NHL | 80 | 64 | 83 | 147 | 22 | 19 | **17** | 10 | 27 | 0 |
| 1982–83 | New York Islanders | NHL | 79 | 60 | 58 | 118 | 20 | 19 | **17** | 9 | 26 | 10 |
| 1983–84 | New York Islanders | NHL | 67 | 51 | 67 | 118 | 8 | 21 | 8 | 10 | 18 | 4 |
| 1984–85 | New York Islanders | NHL | 76 | 58 | 59 | 117 | 38 | 10 | 5 | 6 | 11 | 4 |
| 1985–86 | New York Islanders | NHL | 80 | 61 | 62 | 123 | 14 | 3 | 1 | 2 | 3 | 4 |
| 1986–87 | New York Islanders | NHL | 63 | 38 | 37 | 75 | 33 | 6 | 2 | 3 | 5 | 2 |
| NHL totals | | | 752 | 573 | 553 | 1,126 | 210 | 129 | 85 | 75 | 160 | 38 |

=== International ===
| Year | Team | Event | GP | G | A | Pts | PIM |
|---|---|---|---|---|---|---|---|
| 1981 | Canada | CC | 7 | 8 | 3 | 11 | 2 |
| 1984 | Canada | CC | 8 | 5 | 4 | 9 | 2 |
| Senior totals | | | 15 | 13 | 7 | 20 | 4 |

== Awards and honours ==
| Award | Year(s) | Ref(s) |
|---|---|---|
| Calder Memorial Trophy | 1978 | |
| NHL All-Star Game | 1978, 1980, 1981, 1982, 1983, 1985, 1986 | |
| NHL second All-Star team | 1978, 1979, 1985 | |
| Stanley Cup champion | 1980, 1981, 1982, 1983 | |
| NHL first All-Star team | 1981, 1982, 1983, 1984, 1986 | |
| NHL All-Star Game MVP | 1982 | |
| Conn Smythe Trophy | 1982 | |
| Lady Byng Memorial Trophy | 1983, 1984, 1986 | |
| Canada Cup | 1984 | |
| One of 100 Greatest NHL Players | 2017 | |

== See also ==
- List of NHL players who spent their entire career with one franchise
- List of NHL players with 500 goals
- List of NHL players with 100-point seasons
- List of NHL players with 1000 points
- List of NHL statistical leaders

Achievements
| Preceded by Alex McKendry | New York Islanders first-round draft pick 1977 | Succeeded by Steve Tambellini |
| Preceded by Guy Lafleur; Danny Gare, Charlie Simmer, Blaine Stoughton | NHL Goal Leader; 1979; 1981 | Succeeded by Danny Gare, Charlie Simmer, Blaine Stoughton; Wayne Gretzky |
Awards
| Preceded by Willi Plett | Winner of the Calder Memorial Trophy; 1978 | Succeeded by Bobby Smith |
| Preceded by Butch Goring | Winner of the Conn Smythe Trophy; 1982 | Succeeded by Billy Smith |
| Preceded by Rick Middleton; Jari Kurri | Winner of the Lady Byng Trophy; 1983, 1984; 1986 | Succeeded by Jari Kurri; Joe Mullen |
