= 31st National Hockey League All-Star Game =

Professional ice hockey exhibition game

31st NHL All-Star Game
	1	2	3	OT	Total
Campbell	2	0	0	0	2
Wales	0	1	1	1	3
- Date: January 24, 1978
- Arena: Buffalo Memorial Auditorium
- City: Buffalo
- MVP: Billy Smith (NY Islanders)
- Attendance: 16,433

The 31st National Hockey League All-Star Game was held at the Buffalo Memorial Auditorium in Buffalo, home of the Buffalo Sabres, on January 24, 1978. Wales Conference All-Star team defeated the Campbell Conference for the fourth consecutive year. Gilbert Perreault scored with 1:05 left in sudden death overtime for the winning goal. This was the first all star game to be played with an overtime period. The most valuable player award went to goaltender Billy Smith who stopped 16 shots in the first 30 minutes of the game.

== Team Lineups ==
=== Campbell Conference All-Stars ===
Coach: (Canada) Fred Shero, Philadelphia Flyers

#	Nat.	Player	Pos.	Team
Goalies
31	(Canada)	Billy Smith		New York Islanders
35	(Canada)	Wayne Stephenson		Philadelphia Flyers
Defencemen
2	(Canada)	Bob Dailey		Philadelphia Flyers
3	(Canada)	Tom Bladon		Philadelphia Flyers
4	(Canada)	Carol Vadnais		New York Rangers
5	(Canada)	Denis Potvin		New York Islanders
6	(Canada)	Barry Beck		Colorado Rockies
20	(Canada)	Jimmy Watson		Philadelphia Flyers
Forwards
7	(Canada)	Bill Barber	LW	Philadelphia Flyers
8	(Canada)	Wilf Paiement	RW	Colorado Rockies
9	(Canada)	Clark Gillies	LW	New York Islanders
10	(Canada)	Bill Clement	C	Atlanta Flames
11	(Canada)	Dennis Ververgaert	RW	Vancouver Canucks
12	(Canada)	Ivan Boldirev	C	Chicago Black Hawks
16	(Canada)	Bobby Clarke	C	Philadelphia Flyers
17	(Canada)	Garry Unger	C	St. Louis Blues
19	(Canada)	Bryan Trottier	C	New York Islanders
21	(Sweden)	Roland Eriksson	C	Minnesota North Stars
22	(Canada)	Mike Bossy	RW	New York Islanders
77	(Canada)	Phil Esposito	C	New York Rangers

=== Wales Conference All-Stars ===
Coach: (Canada) Scotty Bowman, Montreal Canadiens

#	Nat.	Player	Pos.	Team
Goalies
29	(Canada)	Ken Dryden		Montreal Canadiens
1	(Canada)	Rogatien Vachon		Los Angeles Kings
Defencemen
18	(Canada)	Serge Savard		Montreal Canadiens
19	(Canada)	Larry Robinson		Montreal Canadiens
21	(Sweden)	Borje Salming		Toronto Maple Leafs
22	(Canada)	Brad Park		Boston Bruins
28	(United States)	Reed Larson		Detroit Red Wings
Forwards
6	(Canada)	Jean Pronovost	RW	Pittsburgh Penguins
7	(Canada)	Rick Martin	LW	Buffalo Sabres
8	(Canada)	Steve Shutt	LW	Montreal Canadiens
9	(Canada)	Lanny McDonald	RW	Toronto Maple Leafs
10	(Canada)	Guy Lafleur	RW	Montreal Canadiens
11	(Canada)	Gilbert Perreault	C	Buffalo Sabres
12	(Canada)	Bob Sirois	RW	Washington Capitals
14	(Canada)	Yvan Cournoyer	RW	Montreal Canadiens
16	(Canada)	Marcel Dionne	C	Los Angeles Kings
20	(Canada)	Dennis Maruk	LW	Cleveland Barons
23	(Canada)	Bob Gainey	LW	Montreal Canadiens
24	(Canada)	Terry O'Reilly	RW	Boston Bruins
27	(Canada)	Darryl Sittler	C	Toronto Maple Leafs

G = Goaltenders; D = Defencemen; C = Center; LW/RW = Left Wing/Right Wing

== Game summary ==
#	Score	Team	Goalscorer (Assist(s))	To,e
First period
1	0-1	Campbell	Barber	1:25
2	0-2	Campbell	Potvin (Clarke)	12:12
Penalties : Salming (Wal.) 7:42; Gillies (Cam.) 18:30
Second period
3	1-2	Wales	Sittler (Robinson - Park)	19:32
Penalties : Dailey (Cam.) 2:25; Smith (Cam.) 3:36; McDonald (Wal.) 3:36; Vadnais (Cam.) 18:12
Third period
4	2-2	Wales	Martin (Dionne - O'Reilly)	18:21
Penalties : none
Sudden Death overtime
5	3-2	Wales	Perreault (Shutt - Salming)	3:55
Penalties : none

Goaltenders :

- Wales : Dryden (29:26 minutes), Vachon (34:29 minutes).
- Campbell : Smith (29:26 minutes), Stephenson (34:29 minutes).

Shots on goal :

- Wales (40) 07 - 16 - 15 - 02
- Campbell (12) 07 - 02 - 03 - 00

Referee : Bruce Hood

Linesmen : John D'Amico, Leon Stickle

== See also ==
- 1977–78 NHL season
