= List of players with five or more goals in an NHL game =

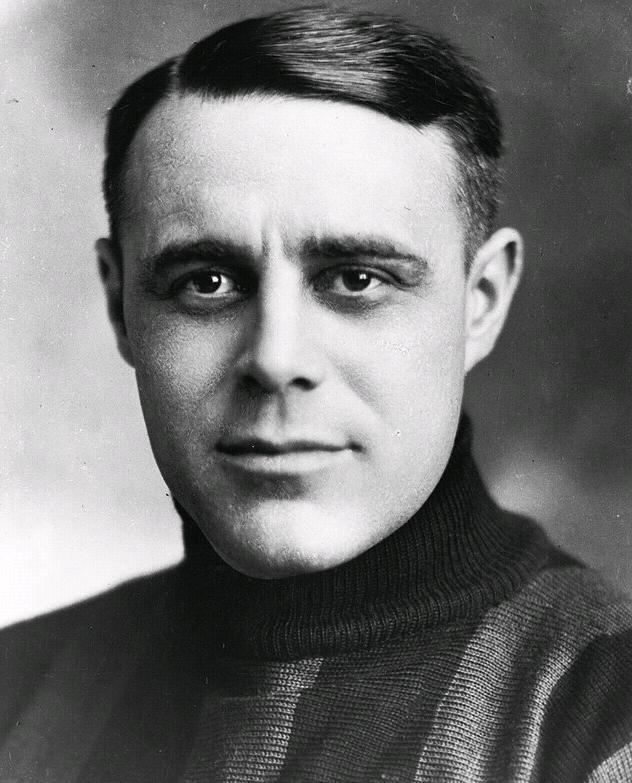
Joe Malone, the first player to score five goals in an NHL game, the only player to score seven goals in a game, and the overall most prolific, scoring at least five goals in five games.

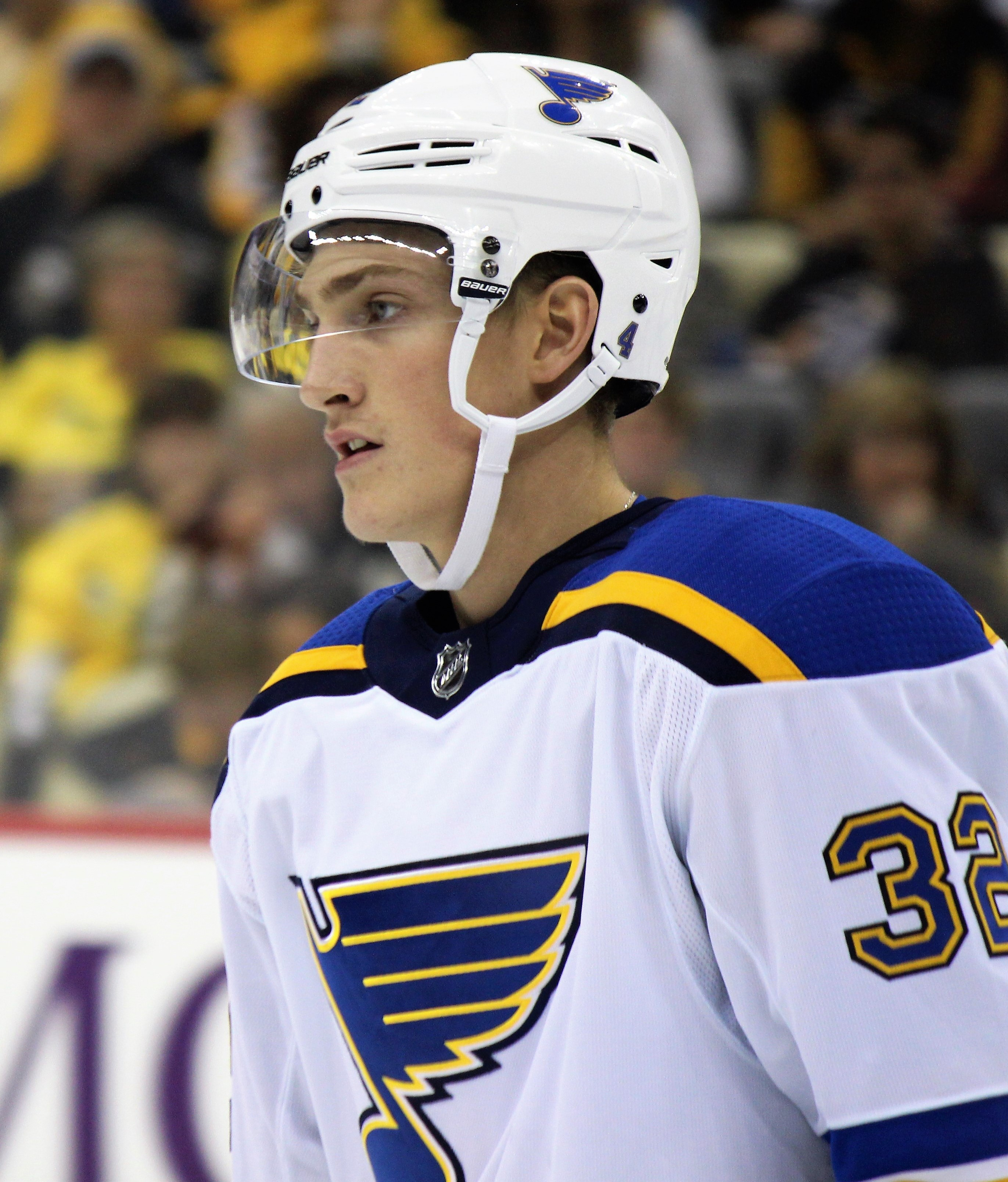
Tage Thompson, the most recent player to score five goals in an NHL game, did it on December 7, 2022.

This is a list of players who have scored five or more goals in a National Hockey League (NHL) game. Scoring five or more goals in a single game is considered a great feat, as it has only been accomplished 64 times, by 48 players, in the history of the league. The first player to do so was Joe Malone, with the Montreal Canadiens, in the first NHL game, on December 19, 1917. The most recent player to do so was Tage Thompson, with the Buffalo Sabres, in the 105th NHL season of play, on December 7, 2022.

Only five players have accomplished this feat while still in their rookie season, and only two of those were within the last century: Don Murdoch on October 12, 1976 (NYR @ MNS), and Howie Meeker on January 8, 1947 (TOR vs. CHI). The other three rookies scored their five goal games more than one hundred years ago: Mickey Roach in 1920, Harry Hyland in 1917, and Joe Malone three times in the 1917-18 season.

In addition to being first, Joe Malone holds the overall record with five five-or-more goal games, including the NHL record seven goals in a game, as well as a six-goal game and three five-goal games – all in the first three seasons of the NHL's existence. He is also the only player to record a five-goal game with more than one team, accomplishing his first three with the Montreal Canadiens and his last two with the Quebec Bulldogs.

Overall, seven players have scored six goals in a game—including brothers Corb and Cy Denneny, with different teams, within a few weeks of each other in 1921. A total of 41 individual players have scored exactly five goals in a game, on one or more occasion. While five-goal games continue to occur from time to time, no player has scored six or more goals since Darryl Sittler scored six in February 1976.

Only eight players have multiple five-goal games. After Malone achieving the mark five times, both Wayne Gretzky and Mario Lemieux attained the mark four times, Newsy Lalonde did it three times, while four other players have had two five-goal games. Of the eight players with multiple five-goal games, only two have achieved the feat multiple times in a single season: Malone (3 times in 1917–18, twice in 1919–20) and Sittler (twice in 1975–76). Gretzky (early and late 1981) and Maurice Richard (early and late 1944) had two five-goal games in the same calendar year, across two NHL seasons.

Ian Turnbull is the only defenseman who has scored five goals in a game, doing so in February 1977. Mario Lemieux is the only player in history to achieve a five-goal game by scoring in five different ways – on December 31, 1988, he scored an even-strength goal, a power-play goal, a short-handed goal, a penalty shot goal and an empty net goal against the New Jersey Devils. Wayne Gretzky's second five-goal game, in December 1981, also marked his achievement of the NHL's fastest 50 goals in 50 games, when he scored five goals in his 39th game of the season.

Of the 63 five-goal games, five were playoff games.

The Montreal Canadiens have had the highest number of players, 9, and the highest number of occurrences, 14, of a five-goal game. The Toronto St. Patricks/Toronto Maple Leafs are second in both categories, with 7 players scoring a five-goal game, on 9 occasions. Five players: Newsy Lalonde in 1919, Maurice Richard in 1944, Darryl Sittler and Reggie Leach in 1976, and Mario Lemieux in 1989 scored 5 goals in playoff games.

Alexei Zhamnov is the only player from this list whose team eventually failed to win — the Los Angeles Kings and the Winnipeg Jets tied 7–7. Sergei Fedorov (in December 1996) and Mika Zibanejad (in March 2020) are the only two players to score all five of their team's goals in a regular season game that ended in overtime. Maurice Richard scored all five goals when the Canadiens defeated Toronto 5–1 in the 1944 playoffs.

== Scorers ==
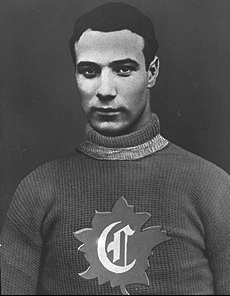
Newsy Lalonde, the first player to score six goals in an NHL game, also had two other five-goal games.

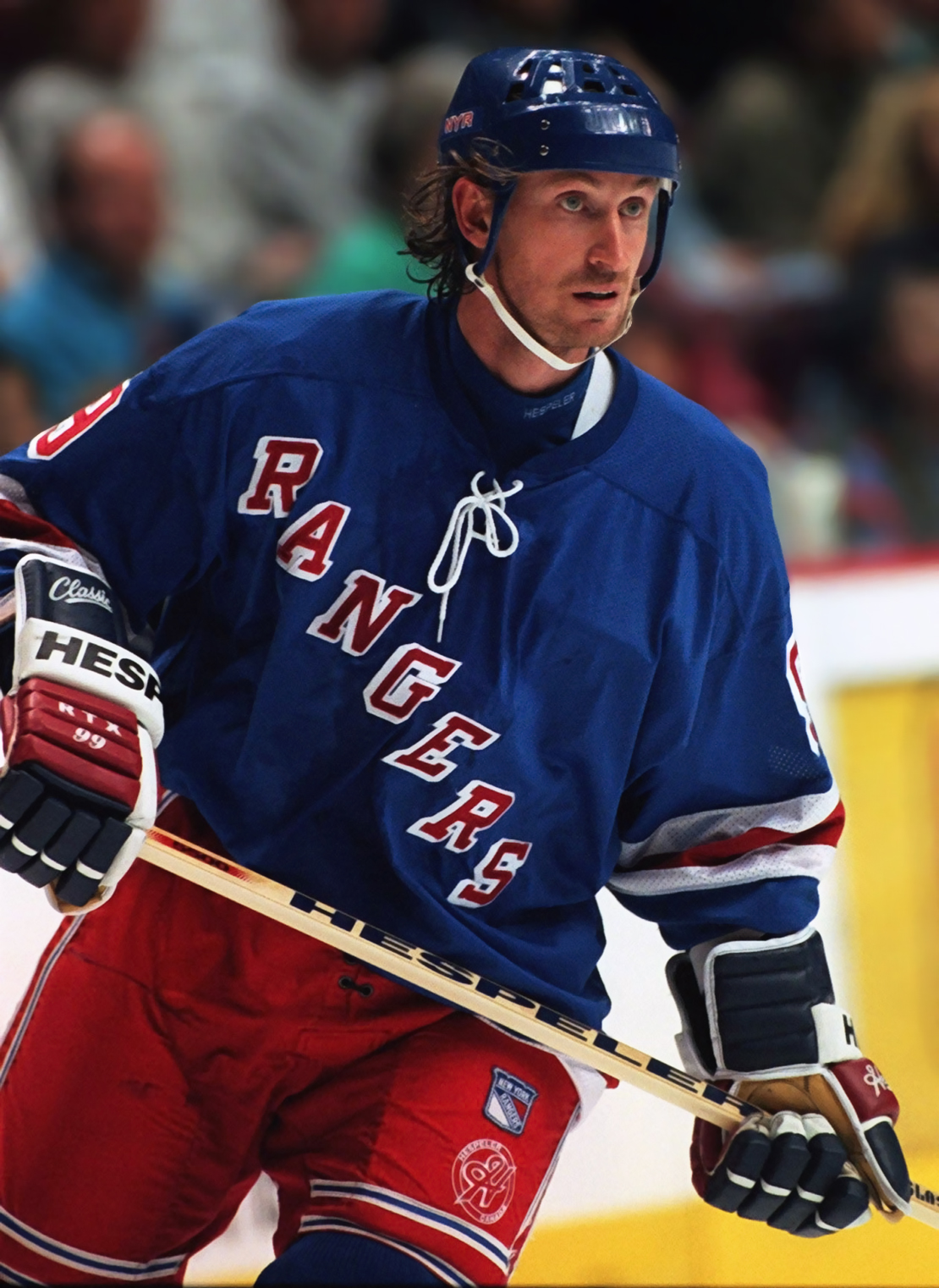
Wayne Gretzky, the NHL's second all-time leading scorer, had four five-goal games.

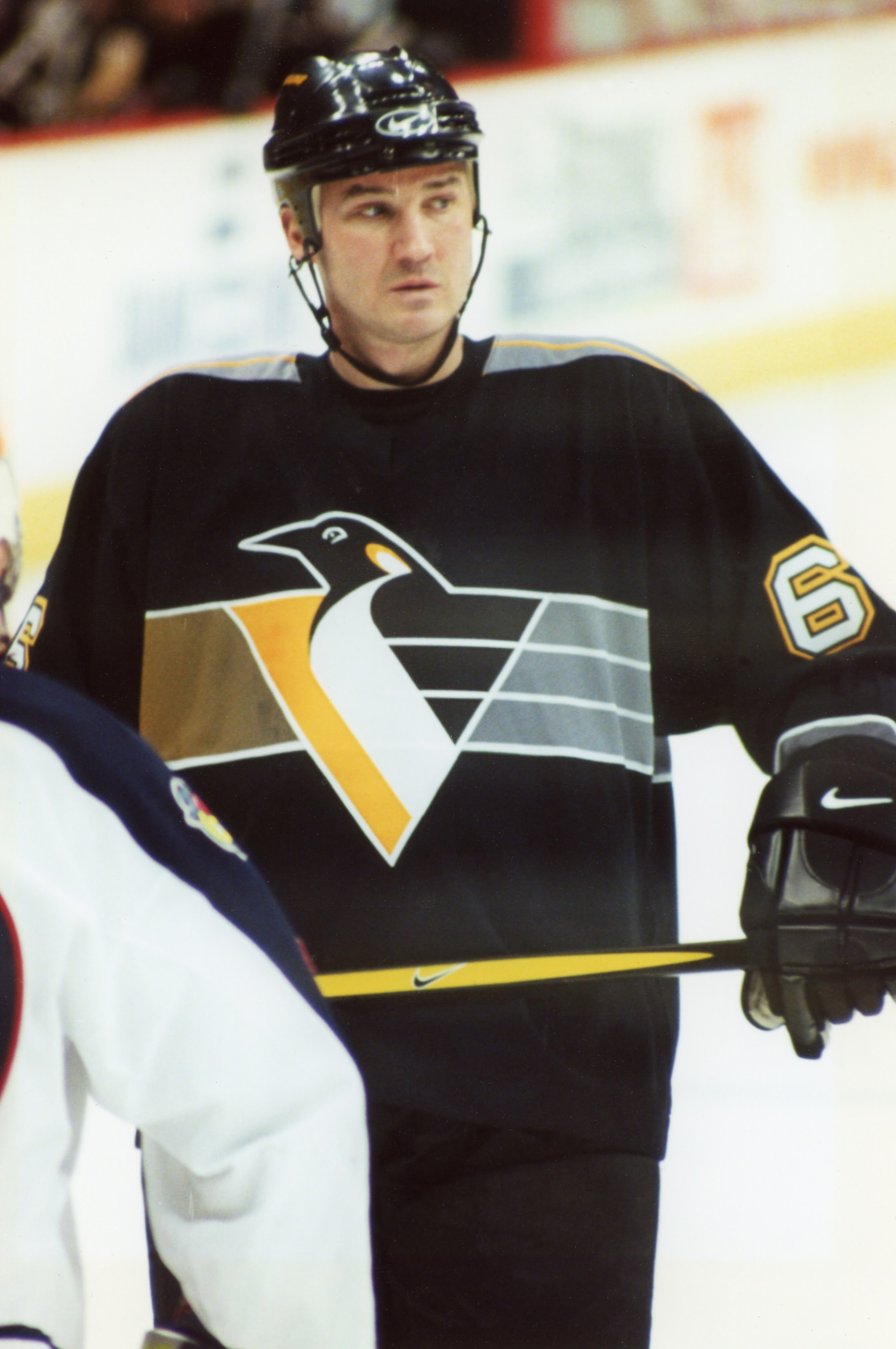
Mario Lemieux recorded four five-goal games.

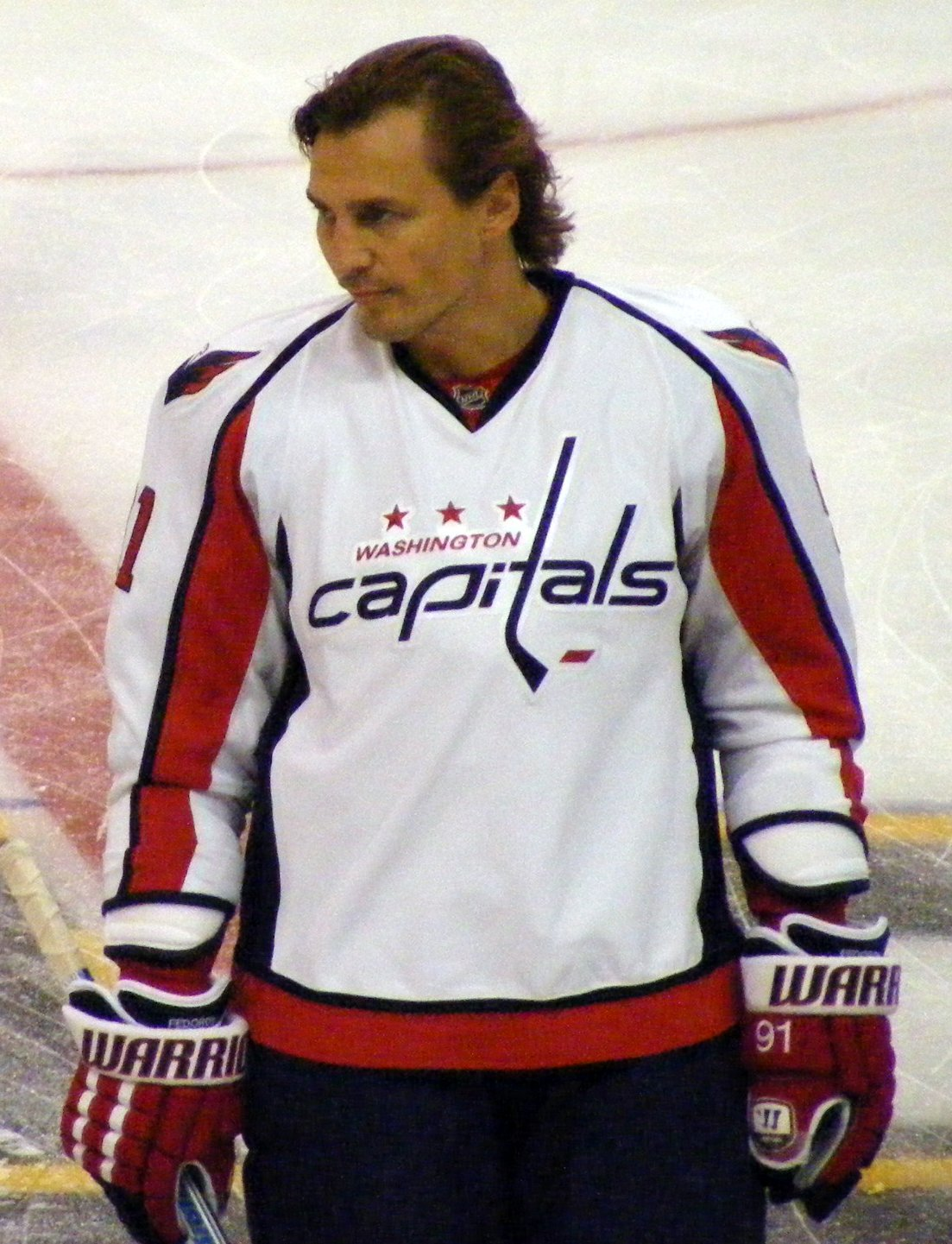
Sergei Fedorov scored all of the Red Wings' goals in a 5–4 overtime win against the Washington Capitals.

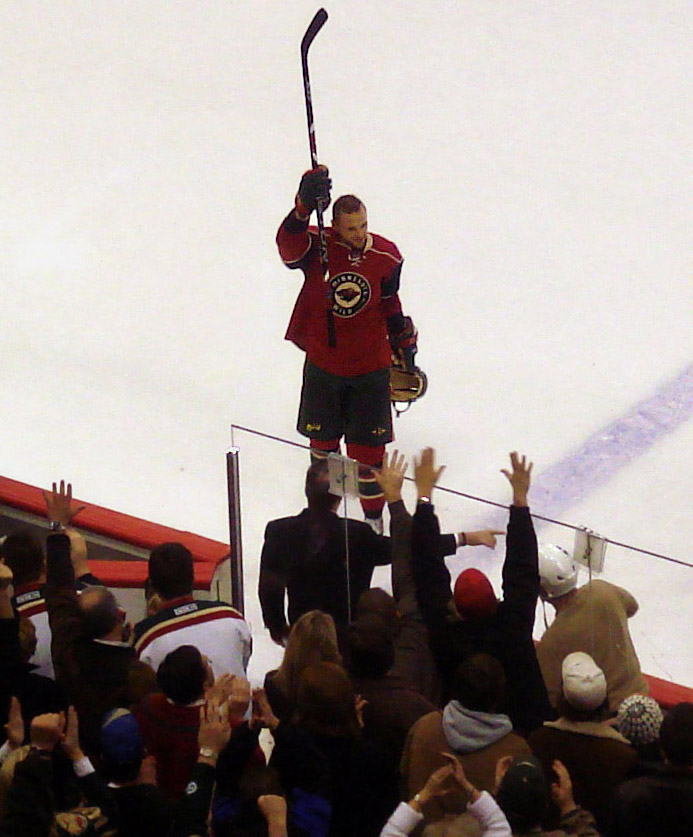
Marian Gaborik, after scoring his fifth goal on December 20, 2007 – first in the 21st century

Legend

Player is still active in the NHL
Player was still in their rookie season
Player scored five goals in a playoff game

Name	Team	Date	Goals
(Canada) Joe Malone	Montreal Canadiens	December 19, 1917	5
(Canada) Harry Hyland	Montreal Wanderers	December 19, 1917	5
(Canada) Joe Malone	Montreal Canadiens	January 12, 1918	5
(Canada) Joe Malone	Montreal Canadiens	February 2, 1918	5
(Canada) Newsy Lalonde	Montreal Canadiens	March 1, 1919	5
(Canada) Newsy Lalonde	Montreal Canadiens	January 10, 1920	6
(Canada) Joe Malone	Quebec Bulldogs	January 31, 1920	7
(Canada) Mickey Roach	Toronto St. Patricks	March 6, 1920	5
(Canada) Joe Malone	Quebec Bulldogs	March 10, 1920	6
(Canada) Corbett Denneny	Toronto St. Patricks	January 26, 1921	6
(Canada) Newsy Lalonde	Montreal Canadiens	February 16, 1921	5
(Canada) Cy Denneny	Ottawa Senators	March 7, 1921	6
(Canada) Babe Dye	Toronto St. Patricks	December 16, 1922	5
(Canada) Red Green	Hamilton Tigers	December 5, 1924	5
(Canada) Babe Dye	Toronto St. Patricks	December 22, 1924	5
(Canada) Punch Broadbent	Montreal Maroons	January 7, 1925	5
(Canada) Alfred Lépine	Montreal Canadiens	December 14, 1929	5
(Canada) Howie Morenz	Montreal Canadiens	March 18, 1930	5
(Canada) Charlie Conacher	Toronto Maple Leafs	January 19, 1932	5
(Canada) Ray Getliffe	Montreal Canadiens	February 6, 1943	5
(Canada) Syd Howe	Detroit Red Wings	February 3, 1944	6
(Canada) Maurice Richard	Montreal Canadiens	March 23, 1944	5
(Canada) Maurice Richard	Montreal Canadiens	December 28, 1944	5
(Canada) Howie Meeker	Toronto Maple Leafs	January 8, 1947	5
(Canada) Bernie Geoffrion	Montreal Canadiens	February 19, 1955	5
(Canada) Bobby Rousseau	Montreal Canadiens	February 1, 1964	5
(Canada) Red Berenson	St. Louis Blues	November 7, 1968	6
(Canada) Yvan Cournoyer	Montreal Canadiens	February 15, 1975	5
(Canada) Darryl Sittler	Toronto Maple Leafs	February 7, 1976	6
(Canada) Darryl Sittler	Toronto Maple Leafs	April 22, 1976	5
(Canada) Reggie Leach	Philadelphia Flyers	May 6, 1976	5
(Canada) Don Murdoch	New York Rangers	October 12, 1976	5
(Canada) Ian Turnbull (D)	Toronto Maple Leafs	February 2, 1977	5
(Canada) Bryan Trottier	New York Islanders	December 23, 1978	5
(Canada) Tim Young	Minnesota North Stars	January 15, 1979	5
(Canada) John Tonelli	New York Islanders	January 6, 1981	5
(Canada) Wayne Gretzky	Edmonton Oilers	February 18, 1981	5
(Canada) Wayne Gretzky	Edmonton Oilers	December 30, 1981	5
(Canada) Grant Mulvey	Chicago Black Hawks	February 3, 1982	5
(Canada) Bryan Trottier	New York Islanders	February 13, 1982	5
(Sweden) Willy Lindström	Winnipeg Jets	March 2, 1982	5
(United States) Mark Pavelich	New York Rangers	February 23, 1983	5
(Finland) Jari Kurri	Edmonton Oilers	November 19, 1983	5
(Sweden) Bengt-Åke Gustafsson	Washington Capitals	January 8, 1984	5
(Canada) Pat Hughes	Edmonton Oilers	February 3, 1984	5
(Canada) Wayne Gretzky	Edmonton Oilers	December 15, 1984	5
(Canada) Dave Andreychuk	Buffalo Sabres	February 6, 1986	5
(Canada) Wayne Gretzky	Edmonton Oilers	December 6, 1987	5
(Canada) Mario Lemieux	Pittsburgh Penguins	December 31, 1988	5
(Canada) Joe Nieuwendyk	Calgary Flames	January 11, 1989	5
(Canada) Mario Lemieux	Pittsburgh Penguins	April 25, 1989	5
(Sweden) Mats Sundin	Quebec Nordiques	March 5, 1992	5
(Canada) Mario Lemieux	Pittsburgh Penguins	April 9, 1993	5
(Slovakia) Peter Bondra	Washington Capitals	February 5, 1994	5
(Canada) Mike Ricci	Quebec Nordiques	February 17, 1994	5
(Russia) Alexei Zhamnov	Winnipeg Jets	April 1, 1995	5
(Canada) Mario Lemieux	Pittsburgh Penguins	March 26, 1996	5
(Russia) Sergei Fedorov	Detroit Red Wings	December 26, 1996	5
(Slovakia) Marián Gáborík	Minnesota Wild	December 20, 2007	5
(Sweden) Johan Franzén	Detroit Red Wings	February 2, 2011	5
(Finland) Patrik Laine	Winnipeg Jets	November 24, 2018	5
(Sweden) Mika Zibanejad	New York Rangers	March 5, 2020	5
(Switzerland) Timo Meier	San Jose Sharks	January 17, 2022	5
(United States) Tage Thompson	Buffalo Sabres	December 7, 2022	5

== Players who scored five or more goals in multiple games ==
Name	Nationality	Total
Joe Malone	Canada	5
Wayne Gretzky	Canada	4
Mario Lemieux	Canada	4
Newsy Lalonde	Canada	3
Babe Dye	Canada	2
Maurice Richard	Canada	2
Darryl Sittler	Canada	2
Bryan Trottier	Canada	2
