= List of New York Islanders records =

This is a list of franchise records for the New York Islanders, a team forming part of the National Hockey League. It includes every franchise record ever won by the Islanders, regardless of whether a record was set previously.

== Team records ==
=== Single season ===
Most points	118	1981–82
Most wins	54	1981–82
Most losses	60	1972–73
Most ties	22	1974–75
Most goals for	385	1981–82
Most goals against	347	1972–73
Fewest points	30	1972–73
Fewest wins	12	1972–73
Fewest losses	15	1978–79
Fewest ties	4	1983–84
Fewest goals for	126; 170	1994–95 (shortened season); 1972–73
Fewest goals against	158; 190	1994–95 (shortened season); 1975–76
Most penalty minutes	1822	1988–89
Fewest penalty minutes	881	1972–73
Most shutouts	11	2018-19 (Robin Lehner 6, Thomas Greiss 5)

=== Single game ===
Most penalty minutes (combined)	346	February 11, 2011 vs. Pittsburgh Penguins

== Individual records ==
=== Career ===
Skaters

Record	Amount	Record holder
Most points	1,353	Bryan Trottier
Most goals	573	Mike Bossy
Most assists	853	Bryan Trottier
Most penalty minutes	1879	Mick Vukota
Most shorthand goals	19	Anders Kallur
+/-	470	Bryan Trottier
Most powerplay goals	181	Mike Bossy
Most game winning goals	82	Mike Bossy
Most shots	3053	Denis Potvin

Goalies

Record	Amount	Record holder
Most wins	304	Billy Smith
Most losses	230	Billy Smith
Most ties	104	Billy Smith
Overtime/shootout losses	24	Rick DiPietro
Most shots against	19083	Billy Smith
Most goals against	2008	Billy Smith
Most saves	17075	Billy Smith
Most shutouts	25	Glenn Resch Ilya Sorokin
Most time on ice	38,129:28	Billy Smith

=== Single season ===
Skaters

Record	Amount	Record holder	Season
Most games played	83	Pierre Turgeon	1992–93
Most games played	83	Benoit Hogue	1993–94
Most games played	83	Travis Green	1993–94
Most points	147	Mike Bossy	1981–82
Most goals	69	Mike Bossy	1978–79
Most assists	87	Bryan Trottier	1978–79
Most penalty minutes	356	Brian Curran	1986–87
Most shorthand goals	7	Bob Bourne	1980–81
+/-	76	Bryan Trottier	1978–79
Most powerplay Goals	28	Mike Bossy	1980–81
Most game winning goals	11	Mike Bossy	1983–84
Most shots	315	Mike Bossy	1980–81

Goalies

Record	Amount	Record holder	Season
Most wins	38	Jaroslav Halak	2014–15
Most consecutive wins	11	Jaroslav Halak	2014–15
Most losses	35	Gerry Desjardins	1972–73
Most ties	17	Billy Smith	1974–75
Overtime/shootout losses	9	Rick DiPietro	2006–07
Most shots against	1917	Rick DiPietro	2006–07
Most goals against	195	Gerry Desjardins	1972–73
Most saves	1761	Rick DiPietro	2006–07
Most shutouts	7	Glenn Resch; Semyon Varlamov; Ilya Sorokin	1975–76; 2020–21; 2021–22
Most time on ice	3,742:47	Chris Osgood	2001–02

=== Single game ===
Most goaltender saves	73 / 75	Kelly Hrudey	April 18–19, 1987 vs. Washington Capitals
