= 50 goals in 50 games =

Individual achievement of fifty goals in a team's first fifty games in an NHL season

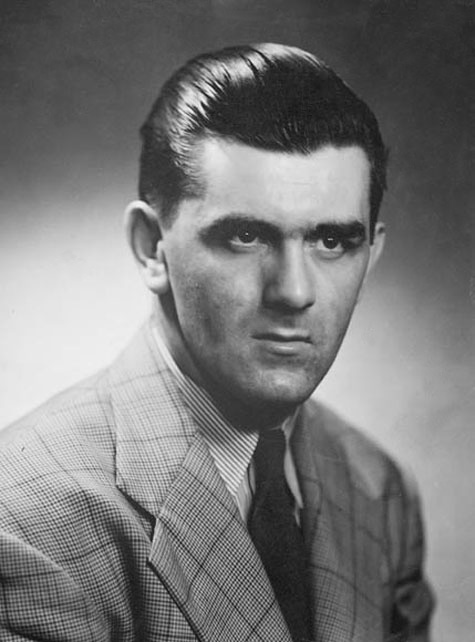
Maurice Richard of the Montreal Canadiens was the first player in NHL history to score 50 goals in one season

In the National Hockey League (NHL), the phrase "50 goals in 50 games" (50-in-50) refers to a player scoring 50 goals within the first 50 (or fewer) games of his team's season. An extremely rare feat, the NHL has officially deemed only five players in eight different seasons to have reached the mark; Brett Hull is the most recent occurrence, having done so in 1990–91. Wayne Gretzky (three times) and Hull (twice) are the only players with multiple official 50-in-50 accomplishments.

== Official 50-in-50 scorers ==
=== Maurice Richard ===
- 1944–45: 50 in 50 games (50-in-50)

Maurice Richard of the Montreal Canadiens was the first player in NHL history to score 50 goals in one season. He scored his 50th goal on March 18, 1945, in the 50th and final game of the 1944–45 season against goalie Harvey Bennett of the Boston Bruins. Richard's accomplishment broke the 27-year-old NHL single-season goal-scoring record; it had previously been held by Joe Malone, also with the Canadiens, who scored 44 goals in a 20-game season in 1917–18, the inaugural season of the NHL.

Besides Richard's 50-in-50 feat, he also led the NHL in goals on four other occasions and was the league's first career 500-goal scorer. Richard never again reached the 50-goal mark in his career, even though the NHL extended its schedule to 60 games in 1946–47 and later to 70 games in 1949–50; Richard retired after the 1959–60 season. In recognition of his achievements, the NHL created an annual award in 1999, the Maurice "Rocket" Richard Trophy, which was donated by the Montreal Canadiens, to be presented to the top goalscorer in the league.

It would take 16 years before a second NHL player scored 50 goals in a season: Bernie Geoffrion, also with the Canadiens, scored 50 goals in 64 games in 1960–61. When Bobby Hull, with the Chicago Black Hawks, finally broke the single-season goal record with 54 goals in 1965–66, fans of the then-retired Richard, noting that Hull was playing in a 70-game schedule, demanded that the NHL continue to recognize Richard's record. Hull's fans countered that Richard had achieved his record during World War II, during which many NHLers enlisted in the military. (Richard, who was notoriously prone to injury throughout his career, was deemed unfit for service.) Additionally, the counterargument noted Richard's failure to match the record in peacetime, with the caliber of the NHL not similarly hindered, even though he played in eleven 70-game seasons.

The NHL awarded Hull the record, while at the same time recognizing Richard as the first, and to that point only, player to score 50 goals in 50 games, firmly establishing the 50-in-50 achievement into NHL lore.

=== Mike Bossy ===
- 1980–81: 50 in 50 games (50-in-50)

In the 1980–81 season, Mike Bossy of the New York Islanders became only the second player to score 50 goals in 50 games, 36 years after Richard had done so. Bossy's quest for the milestone was heavily covered by the hockey press, as Bossy was unofficially competing with Charlie Simmer of the Los Angeles Kings to be the first to accomplish it since Richard. Their "competition" was intense during late January 1981, with both players participating in their 50th game on January 24, 1981: Simmer started the day with 46 goals and Bossy 48. Simmer had a hat trick against Boston, giving him 49 goals in 50 games, barely missing the mark. Making his game against the Quebec Nordiques particularly dramatic, Bossy was scoreless for much of the game but beat goaltender Ron Grahame twice within the final five minutes. He could have had 51 goals in 50 games, but passed the puck back to Bryan Trottier because he felt it was the right play and had already achieved his goal of 50 goals in 50 games. Bossy finished the season with 68 goals in 79 games played while Simmer would finish with 56 goals in 64 games.

=== Wayne Gretzky ===
- 1981–82: 61 in 50 games (50-in-39)
- 1983–84: 61 in 50 games (50-in-42)
- 1984–85: 53 in 50 games (50-in-49)

Wayne Gretzky of the Edmonton Oilers broke the 50-in-50 mark less than a full year after Bossy had tied Richard. In Gretzky's 38th game of the 1981–82 season, he scored four goals against the Kings, giving him 45 on the season. In his next game, on December 30, 1981, he scored a rare five goals in one game against the Philadelphia Flyers, the fifth being an empty-net goal with three seconds left in the game, to give him the record of 50 goals in 39 games. He had 50 goals before any other player had scored 30, and would finish the season with an NHL-record 92 goals, having participated in all 80 of the Oilers' games.

Gretzky went on to score 50 goals within 50 games twice more in his career. In 1983–84, he scored his 50th goal in the team's 42nd game, on January 7, 1984, and finished the season with the second highest single-season total with 87 goals in 74 games. Gretzky's 50th goal was an empty-net goal that put the Oilers up 5–3 in a win over the Hartford Whalers at home. It was also Gretzky's third goal of the game, completing a hat trick.

In 1984–85, he scored his 50th in the team's 49th game, ending the season with 73 goals in 80 games. Gretzky's 50th goal came on January 26, 1985 (his twenty-fourth birthday), on the first of three goals he scored in a 6–3 win over the Pittsburgh Penguins, beating goaltender Denis Herron. It was the third time Gretzky scored 50 goals within 50 games, and the third time his 50-in-50 goal was achieved with a hat trick.

=== Mario Lemieux ===
- 1988–89: 54 in 50 games (50-in-46)

Mario Lemieux of the Pittsburgh Penguins was the next player to score 50 goals in 50 or fewer games, achieving the feat on January 20, 1989. Lemieux's 50th goal came in game 46 of the team's schedule against the Winnipeg Jets and goaltender Pokey Reddick, which was Lemieux's 44th game of the season. Lemieux finished the season with the third highest single season total at the time (now fourth) with 85 goals in 76 games.

=== Brett Hull ===
- 1990–91: 52 in 50 games (50-in-49)
- 1991–92: 50 in 50 games (50-in-50)

Brett Hull scored 50 goals in 50 games or fewer twice in his career for the St. Louis Blues. Hull first did it in the 1990–91 season when he scored his 50th goal, and second of the game, against goalie Dave Gagnon of the Detroit Red Wings on January 25, 1991, in the Blues' 49th game. Hull finished the season with the third highest single season total with 86 goals in 78 games played.

His second time, the most recent season the feat was achieved, was during the subsequent 1991–92 season. On January 28, 1992, Hull scored his 50th goal against goalie Kelly Hrudey in game number 50, a 3–3 tie in Los Angeles. He ended the season with 70 goals in 73 games.

== 50 in player's (not team's) first 50 ==
By definition, the 50-in-50 is an official achievement only because a player completes it within their team's first 50 games, reflecting Maurice Richard's achievement in the 50-game season of 1944–45. This specificity of the first 50 games thus differs from records for most goals in a season, which is not limited by the increasing number of scheduled games in an NHL season, which has been as high as 84 games (1992–93 and 1993–94), and has been set at 82 games since the 1995–96 season. Wayne Gretzky set the current record of 92 goals in a single regular season during the 80 games of the 1981–82 season.

While not an official record, the following players scored fifty goals in or before the 50th game they played in a single season, but outside of their team's first 50 games, due to having missed some of their team's first 50 games due to injury, disciplinary action, or other reasons.

- Jari Kurri scored his 50th goal in his 50th game of the season, during the 53rd game of the 1984–85 Edmonton Oilers season
- Alexander Mogilny scored his 50th goal in his 46th game of the season, during the 53rd game of the 1992–93 Buffalo Sabres season
- Mario Lemieux:
  - scored his 50th goal in his 48th game of the season, during the 72nd game of the 1992–93 Pittsburgh Penguins season
  - scored his 50th goal in his 50th game of the season, during the 59th game of the 1995–96 Pittsburgh Penguins season
- Cam Neely scored his 50th goal in his 44th game of the season, during the 66th game of the 1993–94 Boston Bruins season

== World Hockey Association ==
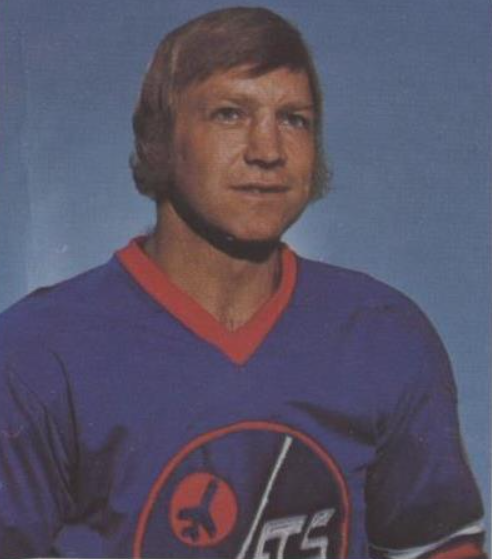
Bobby Hull recorded 50 goals in the first 50 games of the 1974–75 WHA season, doing so on February 14, 1975, with a hat trick in Winnipeg.

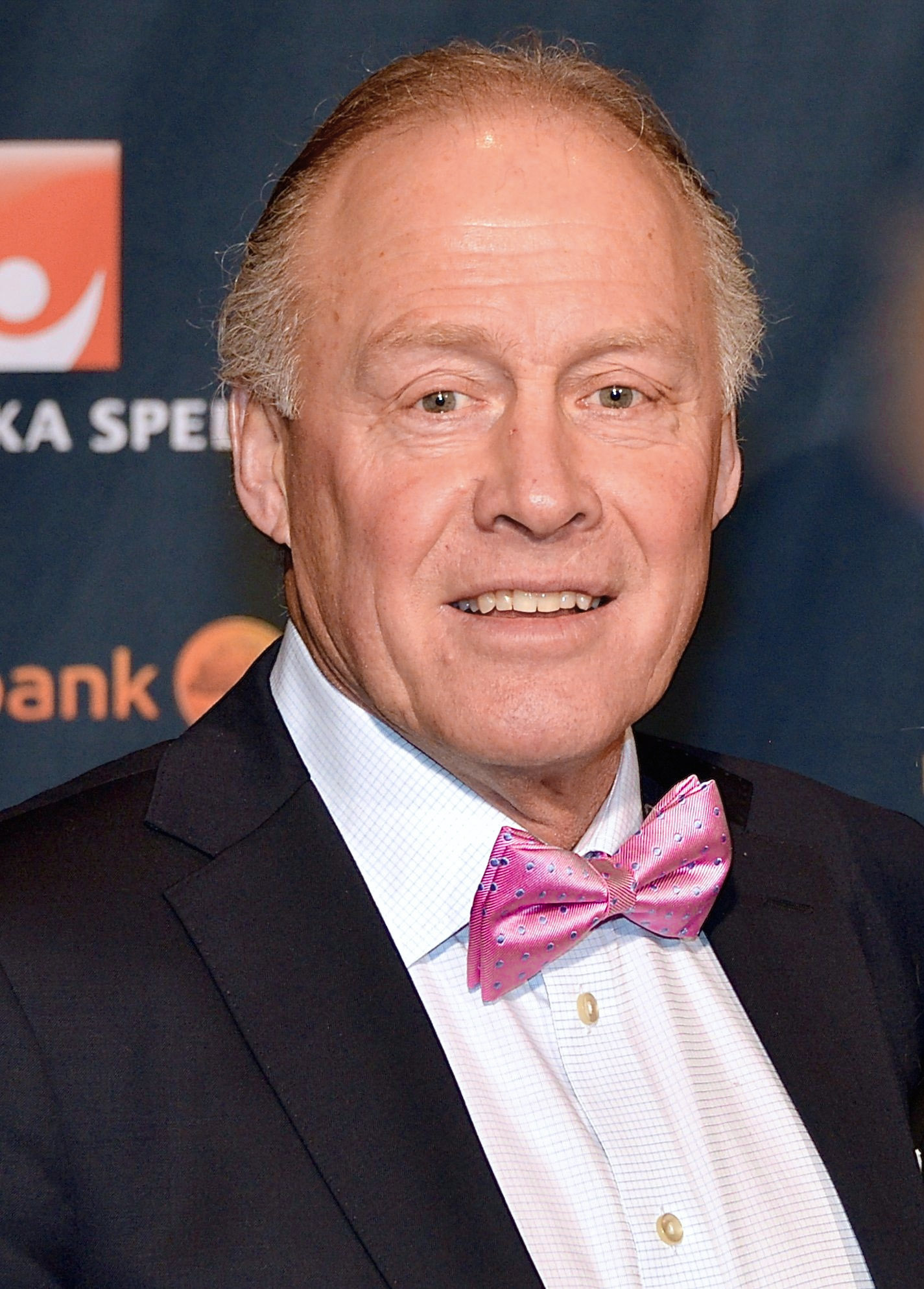
In the first 49 games of the 1976–77 WHA season (while playing in only 47 due to injury), Anders Hedberg scored 51 goals, breaking the 50-50 mark with a hat trick on February 6, 1977, in Winnipeg.

Bobby Hull, despite having never reached 50-in-50 during his NHL career, did earn a 50-in-50 season in 1974–75 with the Winnipeg Jets of the World Hockey Association. Hull's accomplishment made him the first player to reach the mark in any professional hockey league since Maurice Richard's 50-in-50 season in 1944–45. Hull had 47 goals through 49 games before recording a hat trick to achieve the mark in his 50th game, with the third goal coming in with 1:33 remaining past goaltender Ron Grahame of the Houston Aeros at Winnipeg Arena on February 14, 1975. He finished with 77 goals in 78 games, which was the new NHL/WHA single-season record for most goals scored at the time (Phil Esposito of the Boston Bruins had scored 76 in 78 games in 1970–71, though he only scored his 50th goal in his 58th game).

Anders Hedberg, while also playing for the Jets, broke the record in 1976–77. On February 6, 1977, he surpassed both players in the 50-50 club, recording a hat trick against the Calgary Cowboys at Winnipeg Arena, with the 50th goal of the season coming in the third period off Gary Bromley before the 51st goal came on an empty net with one second remaining in a 6-4 victory. Hedberg did his 51 goals while playing 47 games (which included eight combined goals in the two previous games prior to playing Calgary) and he played the game against Calgary with a broken rib and scored his final goal with a knee injury. He was the first NHL or WHA player to score 50 goals in fewer than 50 games and later finished with 70 goals in 68 games.
