= Mike Bossy the Scoring Machine =

1982 pinball machine

Mike Bossy The Scoring Machine
- Manufacturer: Game Plan
- Release date: Prototype: January 1982
- System: Game Plan MPU-2
- Design: Ed Cebula
- Artwork: Larry Day
- Concept: Gil Pollock
- Production run: 1

Mike Bossy The Scoring Machine is a 1982 Game Plan pinball machine which was only manufactured as a prototype, featuring New York Islanders ice hockey star Mike Bossy. There was only a single machine produced.

== Design ==
The game has a "two-layer deep backglass"; the rear layer has a soft portrait of Bossy, and the front transparent layer depicts Bossy skating and has the game title, with the logo of the New York Islanders in the "O".

The playfield is designed to resemble half a ice hockey rink. Mike Bossy is shown, along with opposition players who appear to be from the Boston Bruins team. The backbox has seven digit score displays.

The player can choose between the United States, Canadian, and English national anthems. The game was advertised as "The hockey game you play like a pin ball game." but it really just played like a pinball machine.

In 2012, the machine was owned by collector Jeremy Fleitz who bought it as only a populated playfield and backglasses, creating a custom cabinet. The ROM's were unavailable so a basic ruleset was rewritten using Z80 assembly language.

== Layout ==
The game has three lanes at the top right, above a fairly open playfield. A lane on the left allows access back to the upper lanes. Below this is a bank of four drop-targets with a target that moves from side-to-side; this simulates a hockey goal net. Slightly below this are two widely spaced thumper bumpers. On the far right is a kick-out hole and small flipper. Five targets are at the sides of the playfield.

== Gameplay ==
At the start of the game are nine seconds of "warm-up ice-time" before scoring begins. Hitting targets illuminates lights in M-I-K-E B-O-S-S-Y on the middle of the playfield. The primary objective is to score goals, which act like a score multiplier. The game can show up to 9 goals scored by each player; when a goal is scored a light flashes, and a siren sounds.

The game is over when the picture of Mike Bossy on the backglass lights up.

== Reception ==
Roger Sharpe reviewed the game for Play Meter, awarding it 1.25/4, stating it was "a case of trial and error, where the later won out".
