= 34th National Hockey League All-Star Game =

Professional ice hockey exhibition game

34th NHL All-Star Game
	1	2	3	Total
Wales	2	1	1	4
Campbell	1	1	0	2
- Date: February 9, 1982
- Arena: Capital Centre
- City: Landover
- MVP: Mike Bossy (NY Islanders)
- Attendance: 18,130

The 34th National Hockey League All-Star Game was held in Capital Centre in Landover, Maryland, home to the Washington Capitals, on February 9, 1982. This was the first All-Star game played with geographically-aligned rosters following the NHL's realignment before the season started.

== Uniforms ==
With the exception of the 1979 Challenge Cup, the NHL All-Stars had worn the same uniform design since 1973, itself a modification of a design that had dated back to 1964. For the 1982 game hosted in the suburbs of the United States capital, the NHL decided to introduce new uniforms featuring dozens of stars scattered across the base-colored section of the jersey. The new design also featured triangular side panels on the body of the jersey in a contrasting color that was also used on the lower sleeves - orange on the white jersey worn by the Wales team, and black on the orange jersey worn by the Campbell team. In addition, the names on the back of the jerseys were radially arched, with additional stars added at either end of the player's name.

== Team Lineups ==
=== Wales Conference All-Stars ===
- Coach: (Canada) Al Arbour (New York Islanders)

#	Nat.	Player	Pos.	Team
Goaltender
1	(Canada)	Don Edwards		Buffalo Sabres
29	(Canada)	Michel Dion		Pittsburgh Penguins
Defencemen
3	(Canada)	Barry Beck		New York Rangers
5	(United States)	Mike Ramsey		Buffalo Sabres
6	(Canada)	Raymond Bourque		Boston Bruins
17	(United States)	Rod Langway		Montreal Canadiens
19	(Canada)	Larry Robinson		Montreal Canadiens
25	(Canada)	Randy Carlyle		Pittsburgh Penguins
Forwards
7	(Canada)	Bill Barber	LW	Philadelphia Flyers
8	(Canada)	Marc Tardif	LW	Quebec Nordiques
9	(Canada)	Bryan Trottier	C	New York Islanders
10	(Canada)	Ron Duguay	C	New York Rangers
12	(Canada)	Keith Acton	C	Montreal Canadiens
16	(Canada)	Rick Middleton	RW	Boston Bruins
20	(Canada)	Dennis Maruk	C	Washington Capitals
21	(Canada)	Blaine Stoughton	LW	Hartford Whalers
22	(Canada)	Mike Bossy	RW	New York Islanders
26	(Czechoslovakia)	Peter Stastny	C	Quebec Nordiques
27	(Canada)	John Tonelli	LW	New York Islanders
28	(Canada)	Brian Propp	LW	Philadelphia Flyers

=== Campbell Conference All-Stars ===
- Coach: (Canada) Glen Sonmor (Minnesota North Stars)

#	Nat.	Player	Pos.	Team
Goaltender
1	(Canada)	Grant Fuhr		Edmonton Oilers
27	(Canada)	Gilles Meloche		Minnesota North Stars
Defencemen
2	(Canada)	Bob Manno		Toronto Maple Leafs
3	(Finland)	Pekka Rautakallio		Calgary Flames
4	(Canada)	Craig Hartsburg		Minnesota North Stars
7	(Canada)	Paul Coffey		Edmonton Oilers
24	(Canada)	Doug Wilson		Chicago Black Hawks
28	(Canada)	Harold Snepsts		Vancouver Canucks
Forwards
9	(Canada)	Don Lever	C	Colorado Rockies
10	(Canada)	Dale Hawerchuk	C	Winnipeg Jets
11	(Canada)	Mark Messier	LW	Edmonton Oilers
12	(Canada)	Brian Sutter	LW	St. Louis Blues
15	(Canada)	Bobby Smith	RW	Minnesota North Stars
17	(Canada)	Denis Savard	RW	Chicago Black Hawks
18	(Canada)	Dave Taylor	RW	Los Angeles Kings
19	(Canada)	Dino Ciccarelli	RW	Minnesota North Stars
20	(Canada)	Al Secord	LW	Chicago Black Hawks
22	(Canada)	Rick Vaive	RW	Toronto Maple Leafs
26	(Canada)	John Ogrodnick	RW	Detroit Red Wings
99	(Canada)	Wayne Gretzky	C	Edmonton Oilers

G = Goaltender; D = Defencemen; C = Center; LW/RW = Left Wing/Right Wing

== Game summary ==
#	Score	Team	Goals(Assist(s))	Time
First period
1	0-1	Campbell	Vaive (Sutter)	2:32
2	1-1	Wales	Bourque (Carlyle - Maruk)	12:03 AN
3	2-1	Wales	Tardif (Middleton - Stastny)	13:27
Second period
4	2-2	Campbell	Gretzky (Coffey - Ciccarelli)	0:26
5	3-2	Wales	Bossy (Beck - Tonelli)	17:10
Third period
6	4-2	Wales	Bossy (Robinson)	1:19

Goaltenders :

- Campbell : Fuhr (30:23), Meloche (29:37)
- Wales : Dion (30:23), Edwards (29:37)

Shots on goal :

- Campbell (28) 17 - 05 - 06
- Wales (31) 08 - 16 - 07

Referee : Wally Harris

Linesmen : Ron Finn, Swede Knox

- MVP: Mike Bossy, (New York Islanders)

== See also ==
- 1981–82 NHL season
