= Clark Gillies =

Canadian ice hockey player (1954–2022)

- Hockey Hall of Fame, 2002
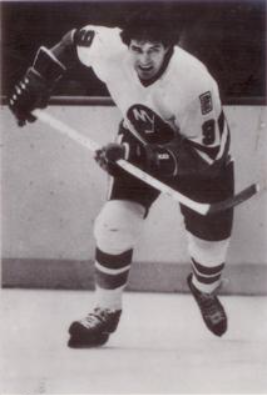
- Gillies with the New York Islanders in 1979
- Born: April 7, 1954 Moose Jaw, Saskatchewan, Canada
- Died: January 21, 2022 (aged 67) Greenlawn, New York, U.S.
- Height: 6 ft 3 in (191 cm)
- Weight: 210 lb (95 kg; 15 st 0 lb)
- Position: Left wing
- Shot: Left
- Played for: New York Islanders; Buffalo Sabres
- National team: Canada
- NHL draft: 4th overall, 1974; New York Islanders
- WHA draft: 37th overall, 1974; Edmonton Oilers
- Playing career: 1974–1988

Clark Gillies (April 7, 1954 – January 21, 2022) was a Canadian professional ice hockey player. He played for the New York Islanders and Buffalo Sabres of the National Hockey League (NHL) between 1974 and 1988.

From 1975 to 1979, Gillies recorded four straight 30-goal seasons; from 1977 to 1979, he also served as captain of the Islanders before delegating the responsibility to Denis Potvin. An aggressive playmaker who opened up chances for his team to score as part of the "Trio Grande" line with Mike Bossy at right wing and Bryan Trottier at center, Gillies served as a key piece of the Islander dynasty that won the Stanley Cup four consecutive times from 1980 to 1983. With his scoring output declining in 1986, he departed the Islanders and played his final two seasons with the Sabres.

In 958 career games over 14 seasons, Gillies recorded 319 goals, 378 assists, and 1,023 penalty minutes. His jersey was retired by the Islanders in 1996 and he was elected to the Hockey Hall of Fame in 2002.

== Early life ==
Gillies grew up in Moose Jaw, Saskatchewan. Once asked where his hometown is located, he famously joked, "Six feet from the moose's ass." Gillies started skating at around the age of four. His father insisted that Clark learn to skate and keep his balance before allowing him to bring a hockey stick onto the ice. He began playing ice hockey casually at the age of six and in organized leagues at the age of seven. He played with a local team in Moose Jaw until it ceased operation. As one of the bigger players on the ice, he was often engaged in fights with players on other teams, which he felt added to the fun of playing.

== Playing career ==
=== Early career ===
Gillies' first professional sports experience was in baseball. In 1970, at 16, Gillies signed with the Houston Astros and played three years of minor league baseball in Covington, Virginia. He hit .241 in 86 games as a catcher/first baseman. He platooned at first base in 1972 with future Islander teammate Bob Bourne. Gillies suffered from homesickness and continued to play hockey during the off season. He eventually moved on to play in the Western Canada Hockey League with the Regina Pats. The Pats had been scouting another player at the time, but were impressed by Gillies, who was a bigger player for the era (he would be listed at 6 ft 3 in (1.91 m) and 210 pounds (95 kg)). During his tenure with the Pats, Gillies accrued 570 penalty minutes in 201 games. In 1974, his final season for Regina, Gillies had 46 goals and 66 assists, was named to the league's First All-Star team, and the team won the 1974 Memorial Cup as Canadian major junior hockey champions.

=== Professional career ===
Gillies was the fourth overall selection in the first round of the 1974 NHL Amateur Draft by the New York Islanders. He was also picked by the World Hockey Association's Edmonton Oilers in the WHA draft, but signed with the Islanders, making the team out of training camp. It was during his rookie season of 1974–75, in the playoffs, that Gillies established himself as one of the toughest players in the National Hockey League (NHL) when beating up enforcer Dave Schultz.

In the latter half of the 1976–77 season, Gillies was named team captain; however, in spite of Gillies' articulate speaking manner and amiable nature, he never felt completely comfortable as captain. Gillies captained the Islanders through two disappointing seasons, in part because the Islanders appeared to lack team toughness. During the pre-season of 1979–80 Gillies allowed Denis Potvin to take over as captain.

During the 1980 playoffs, Gillies got the best of Terry O'Reilly, one of the Boston Bruins' toughest players, several times, helping to fuel the Islanders' drive to the Stanley Cup. Gillies was used during this series as the Islanders' chief protector and enforcer, and in taking on this role, Gillies allowed his team to battle through a violent series with the Bruins. Gillies, now totally comfortable with his role with the team, flourished individually and collectively, as the Islanders won the Stanley Cup in four consecutive years, from 1980 to 1983, during Gillies' tenure.

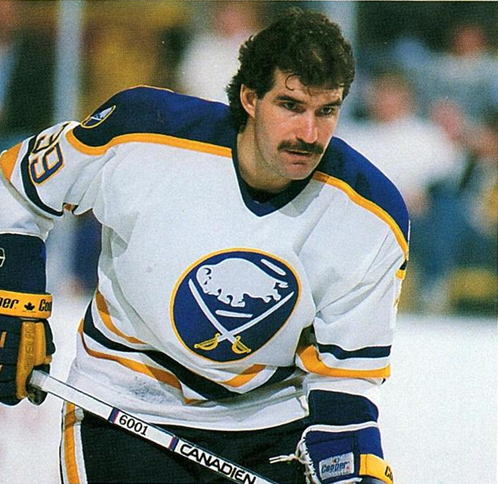
Gillies with the Buffalo Sabres in 1986

Gillies scored over 30 goals for four straight seasons (starting in 1975–76) as part of the "Trio Grande", the Islanders' top forward line with Mike Bossy and Bryan Trottier, and again in 1980–81 and 1981–82. In 1977 he finished tenth in the voting for the Hart Trophy for most valuable player in the NHL. In 1978 and 1979 he led all left-wingers for most votes for the All-Star game, and was named to the NHL First All-Star Team as a left-winger at the conclusion of these two seasons. In 1981, he played for the Canadian national team in the Canada Cup, scoring seven points in seven games.

After scoring only four goals in 55 games in 1985–86, Gillies was left unprotected in the NHL waiver draft, and was claimed by the Buffalo Sabres on October 6, 1986. While wearing numbers 39 and 90 in Buffalo, Gillies retired after playing a season and a half with the Sabres. On December 7, 1996, Gillies' No. 9 was retired by the Islanders.

Gillies was inducted into the Hockey Hall of Fame in 2002. Although his overall statistics were respectable but not considered Hall of Fame caliber, his role as an aggressive playmaker (power forward) was key for Trio Grande linemates Bossy and Trottier to thrive, as was his clutch scoring ability (44 game-winning goals).

He was also inducted into the Saskatchewan Sports Hall of Fame.

== Personal life and death ==
Gillies' nickname, "Jethro", came from teammate Ed Westfall, based on the character Jethro Bodine in the TV series The Beverly Hillbillies.

When Gillies, per tradition, got to have the Stanley Cup with him for 24 hours after the Islanders won it for the first time in 1980, he let his dog, a German Shepherd, eat from it. "Why not?" he responded to critics. "He's a good dog."

Gillies, who was honoured by the Islanders on December 13, 2014, remained active in the Long Island community. He was a business development manager at Protective Wealth Consultants in Huntington, New York. He played in 30 to 40 charity softball games per year. He formed a foundation that was dedicated to helping "physically, mentally, or financially challenged" children, which has raised over $3 million in donations, which included helping to finance construction of the pediatric unit at Huntington Hospital, which was named in his honor. He was inducted into the Suffolk Sports Hall of Fame on Long Island in the Hockey Category with the Class of 1998.

He was married to Pam, who is also from Moose Jaw. They lived in Greenlawn, New York. His son-in-law, Justin Bourne, is the son of his former teammate Bob Bourne, and worked as an assistant coach of the Toronto Marlies. His nephew, Colton Gillies, played in the NHL between 2008 and 2013. He was not related to Trevor Gillies, who also played for the Islanders.

Gillies died of pancreatic cancer at his residence in Greenlawn on January 21, 2022, at the age of 67.

== Career statistics ==
=== Regular season and playoffs ===
			Regular season					Playoffs
Season	Team	League	GP	G	A	Pts	PIM	GP	G	A	Pts	PIM
1971–72	Regina Pats	WCHL	68	31	48	79	199	15	5	10	15	49
1972–73	Regina Pats	WCHL	68	40	52	92	192	4	0	3	3	34
1973–74	Regina Pats	WCHL	65	46	66	112	179	16	9	8	17	32
1973–74	Regina Pats	M-Cup	—	—	—	—	—	3	1	3	4	19
1974–75	New York Islanders	NHL	80	25	22	47	66	17	4	2	6	36
1975–76	New York Islanders	NHL	80	34	27	61	96	13	2	4	6	16
1976–77	New York Islanders	NHL	70	33	22	55	93	12	4	4	8	15
1977–78	New York Islanders	NHL	80	35	50	85	76	7	2	0	2	15
1978–79	New York Islanders	NHL	75	35	56	91	68	10	1	2	3	11
1979–80	New York Islanders	NHL	73	19	35	54	49	21	6	10	16	63
1980–81	New York Islanders	NHL	80	33	45	78	99	18	6	9	15	28
1981–82	New York Islanders	NHL	79	38	39	77	75	19	8	6	14	34
1982–83	New York Islanders	NHL	70	21	20	41	76	8	0	2	2	10
1983–84	New York Islanders	NHL	76	12	16	28	65	21	12	7	19	19
1984–85	New York Islanders	NHL	54	15	17	32	73	10	1	0	1	9
1985–86	New York Islanders	NHL	55	4	10	14	55	3	1	0	1	6
1986–87	Buffalo Sabres	NHL	61	10	17	27	81	—	—	—	—	—
1987–88	Buffalo Sabres	NHL	25	5	2	7	51	5	0	1	1	25
NHL totals			958	319	378	697	1,023	164	47	47	94	287

=== International ===
Year	Team	Event	GP	G	A	Pts	PIM
1981	Canada	CC	7	2	5	7	8
Senior totals			7	2	5	7	8

- All statistics are taken from NHL.com.

== Awards ==
- WCHL All-Star Team – 1974
- Stanley Cup champion – 1980, 1981, 1982, 1983
- NHL First All-Star Team - 1977-78, 1978-79

Achievements
Preceded by Denis Potvin	New York Islanders first-round draft pick 1974	Succeeded by Pat Price
Preceded by Ed Westfall	New York Islanders captain 1977–79	Succeeded by Denis Potvin
