= Bryan Trottier =

Canadian-American ice hockey player and coach (born 1956)

- Hockey Hall of Fame, 1997
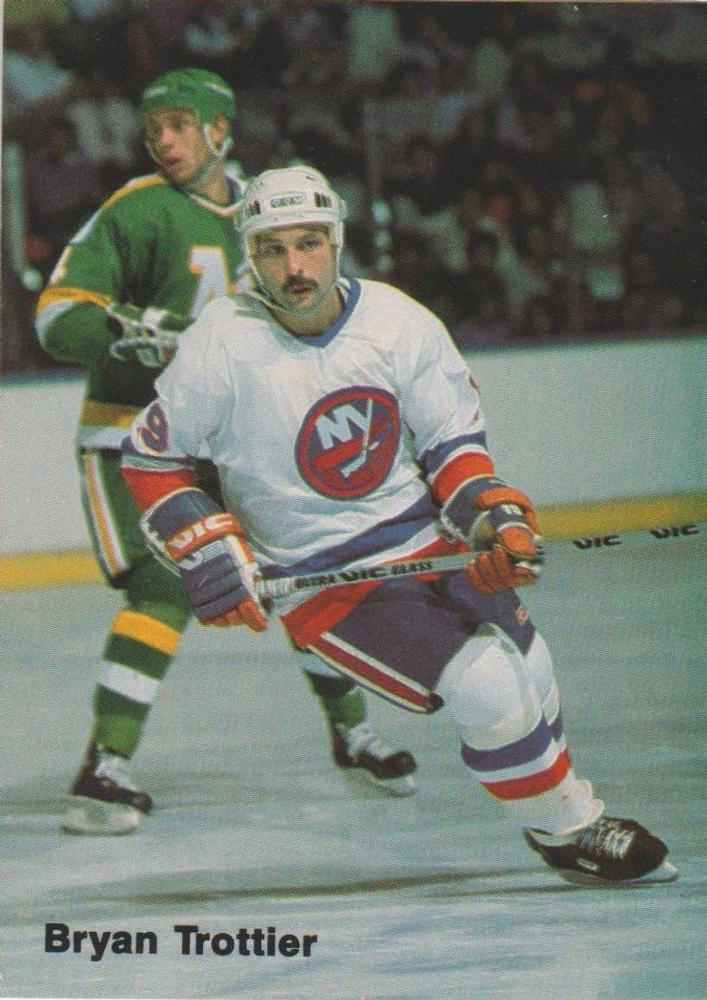
- Trottier with the New York Islanders in 1985
- Born: July 17, 1956 (age 70) Val Marie, Saskatchewan, Canada
- Height: 5 ft 11 in (180 cm)
- Weight: 195 lb (88 kg; 13 st 13 lb)
- Position: Centre
- Shot: Left
- Played for: New York Islanders; Pittsburgh Penguins
- National team: Canada and United States
- NHL draft: 22nd overall, 1974; New York Islanders
- WHA draft: 18th overall, 1974; Cincinnati Stingers
- Playing career: 1975–1992; 1993–1994

Bryan John Trottier (born July 17, 1956) is a Hall of Fame professional ice hockey centre and coach who played 18 seasons in the National Hockey League (NHL) winning the Stanley Cup championship seven times for the New York Islanders (4) and Pittsburgh Penguins(2) and one as an assistant coach for the Colorado Avalanche.

Of mixed aboriginal heritage (Cree / Chippewa / Metis) 'Trots' is celebrated as one of the greatest of all time (GOAT) native indigenous north american athletes, played for both team Canada and team USA, and is on the Canadian Sports Hall of Fame and in 2017 was named one of the NHLs Top 100 Players of all time.

Trottier was drafted with the 22nd pick in 1974 by the Islanders and made the opening lineup in 1975, which saw him set a rookie record for points (95) and win the Calder Memorial Trophy as NHL rookie of the year in 1976. In the 1978–79 season, he led the NHL with a career-high 134 points; on December 23, he became the first Islander to score five goals in a game and set an NHL record that same night when he recorded the most points in a single period with six (four goals and two assists); the record has been matched but never broken. In that season, he won the Art Ross Trophy as the leading-point scorer and also won the Hart Memorial Trophy as the most valuable player; he was the first (and so far only) Islander to win both awards in franchise history. The next year, he won the Conn Smythe Trophy at the most valuable player in the 1980 Stanley Cup playoffs with 29 points in 21 games as the Islanders won the first of four consecutive Stanley Cup championships. In a game on February 13 of the 1981–82 season, he recorded a five-goal game to become the seventh NHL player with multiple five-goal games.

He recorded his 500th goal in 1990, becoming the 15th player to reach the mark in NHL history. He was bought out of his contract by the Islanders after the season and subsequently signed as a free agent with Pittsburgh, where he provided veteran leadership as the Penguins won the Stanley Cup in 1991 and 1992. He initially retired in 1992 but returned for one more season with Pittsburgh before finally retiring in 1994. One of the best Islanders in franchise history, Trottier recorded 524 goals and 901 assists for 1,425 points in over 1,200 games; in the playoffs, he recorded 182 points in 221 games played. He was inducted into the Hockey Hall of Fame in 1997 and his jersey was retired by the Islanders in 2001. In 2017, Trottier was named one of the "100 Greatest NHL Players" in history.

Trottier served as an assistant coach with the Penguins from 1993 to 1997. He became a coach with the Colorado Avalanche in 1998, where he was on the staff when the Avalanche won the Cup in 2001 to give Trottier a seventh championship. He served as coach of the New York Rangers in 2002, where he coached for 54 games before being fired. He worked in the front office for the Islanders beginning in 2006 before being hired as an assistant coach with the Buffalo Sabres in 2014, where he coached the 2014–15 season.

== Early life ==
Trottier grew up in the town of Val Marie, Saskatchewan, Canada, located between Swift Current and the Montana border with his parents and four siblings. His father was of Cree Métis descent, and his mother is of Irish origin. He experienced racism as a child, but his parents encouraged him to be proud of his native heritage. Trottier has one older sister, Carol, and three younger siblings, Kathy, Monty and Rocky. Monty played professional minor league hockey, and Rocky played in 38 games for the New Jersey Devils.

Growing up in the 1960s, Trottier wanted to be like his idol Jean Béliveau. When he was learning to skate, his father would clear out the dam on the creek across their home with a machete, to create a surface to practice on.

As a child, Trottier played for the Climax Hockey Team in Climax, Saskatchewan. He joined the Swift Current Broncos in 1972. It was with the Broncos that he met Tiger Williams, who he credited with teaching key lessons (such as fighting) to Trottier. In one instance, a homesick Trottier was debating on quitting hockey, even planning to go back to school after having arrived back home for Christmas. Williams arrived at his house and insisted on him coming back with to the Broncos, which worked out for Trottier, who credited him as making hockey become fun again. In that season, Trottier recorded 157 total points in 135 games. Playing with the Lethbridge Broncos in the 1974–75 WCHL season. he had 46 goals and 98 assists in 67 games and was named league MVP.

== Playing career ==
Trottier was drafted in both of the 1974 WHA amateur draft and the 1974 NHL entry draft. The WHA Cincinnati Stingers reportedly offered him $50,000 a year for the next ten years, but Trottier elected to go with the Islanders (who selected him in the second round as the 22nd overall pick), although he played in the WCHL one further season before going to training camp in 1975 in preparation of the 1975–76 season. That year, he set an NHL rookie record of 95 points and won the Calder Memorial Trophy as the NHL's rookie of the year (his record was later broken by Peter Šťastný of the Quebec Nordiques in the 1980–81 season).

Trottier's best offensive season was 1978–79 when he scored 134 points, earning him the Art Ross Trophy as the league's top scorer, as well as the Hart Memorial Trophy as the most valuable player. In winning the Art Ross, he became the first player from a post-Original Six expansion team to win the award. In that same season, he led the NHL in assists with 87, which he had also done the year before with 77.

Trottier was one of the core players on the Islanders' dynasty teams from the 1980s. He won four Stanley Cups during his time with the Islanders from 1980 to 1983. During New York's first Stanley Cup in 1980, he won the Conn Smythe Trophy as playoff MVP. In 1981–82, Trottier scored 50 goals, the highest single-season total of his career.

During the early 1980s, when Wayne Gretzky set numerous scoring marks, Islanders broadcaster Stan Fischler and head coach Al Arbour nonetheless maintained that Trottier was the league's best player over Gretzky. Trottier was described as a forward possessing an all-around game including ruggedness and defensive responsibility, and there were comparisons to Milt Schmidt and Gordie Howe. Arbour stated, "Gretzky is an offensive genius for sure. But at this stage Trots gives you more things. Defensively, he's outstanding. And he's physically tough. He comes up with his 100 points a year, automatically, along with everything else!"

Trottier was often referred to as the "glue" on the Islanders team, leading his fellow stars Clark Gillies and Mike Bossy on a line known as "The Trio Grande." While the 1977–78 season was Bossy's rookie year, the Trio Grande at one point led the NHL in scoring above the top lines of the Montreal Canadiens and the Colorado Rockies. Other linemates that played with Trottier included John Tonelli, Bob Bourne and Bob Nystrom. Trottier, however, was most known for his dynamic on-ice partnership with Mike Bossy during his prime years with the Islanders until Bossy's early retirement at the end of the 1987 season.

In the leadup to the 1984 Canada Cup, Trottier decided to play for the United States in the tournament, having previously represented Canada in 1981, a decision that earned him boos in exhibition games held in Canada. Trottier stated, "Nothing against Canada, but I'd like to play for the U.S. and do something for the country that has been good to me." He was able to obtain the necessary U.S. citizenship in July 1984 because he had Métis ancestry on his father's side (Cree/Chippewa). His North American Indian Card (for which he qualified because his grandmother was a Chippewa) entitled him to citizenship in both the U.S. and Canada, as well as a U.S. passport, which was all he needed for tournament eligibility.

In the 1988–89 season, Trottier had his first season with a negative plus-minus, doing so with a season that saw him drop to 17 goals and 28 assists in 73 games for a -7 rating. He was awarded the King Clancy Memorial Trophy for his leadership on and off the ice. In the 1989–90 season, he played in just 59 games and recorded 13 goals with 11 assists. Trottier scored his 500th career goal, doing so on February 13, 1990 against the Calgary Flames in his 1,104th game as a player; he was the 15th player to reach 500 goals and the second Islander to do so after Bossy. It was his last goal as an Islander. When the Islanders were eliminated in the Stanley Cup playoffs, Trottier was benched for the final game. After that low output, on July 3, Islanders management bought out the last two years of Trottier's contract, which he remarked was a "painful" moment. He ranks second in Islanders history in goals, and first in assists and points. It could be noted, however, that even as Trottier's scoring declined, he remained a strong defensive player and team leader.

The Pittsburgh Penguins signed Trottier as a free agent on July 20, 1990, to provide experience and leadership to a young team, most notably with Jaromír Jágr, who had recently emigrated from Czechoslovakia; Randy Gilhen, who wore the number 19 jersey in Pittsburgh the previous season, gifted Trottier the number in training camp. Playing in 52 games, he logged nine goals with 19 assists. In the 1991 Stanley Cup playoffs run, he had three goals (two of which proving to be the game-winner) and four assists as the Penguins won the Stanley Cup that year for Trottier's fifth Cup as a player. He played in 63 games of the following 1991–92 season and earned a trip to the All-Star Game while scoring 11 goals with 18 assists. In the playoffs, he had four goals with three assists as Pittsburgh repeated in winning the Stanley Cup. Trottier took the 1992–93 season off, returning to the Isles in a front-office capacity, but financial troubles, stemming from poor investments, forced Trottier to re-sign as a free agent with the Penguins on June 22, 1993, and return to the ice with the Penguins for the 1993–94 season. On the ice, he had just four goals in 41 games before closing out his career with two appearances in the playoffs. He retired after the season, doing so with a point total of 1,425 points that ranked sixth all-time in NHL history.

== Coaching and executive career ==
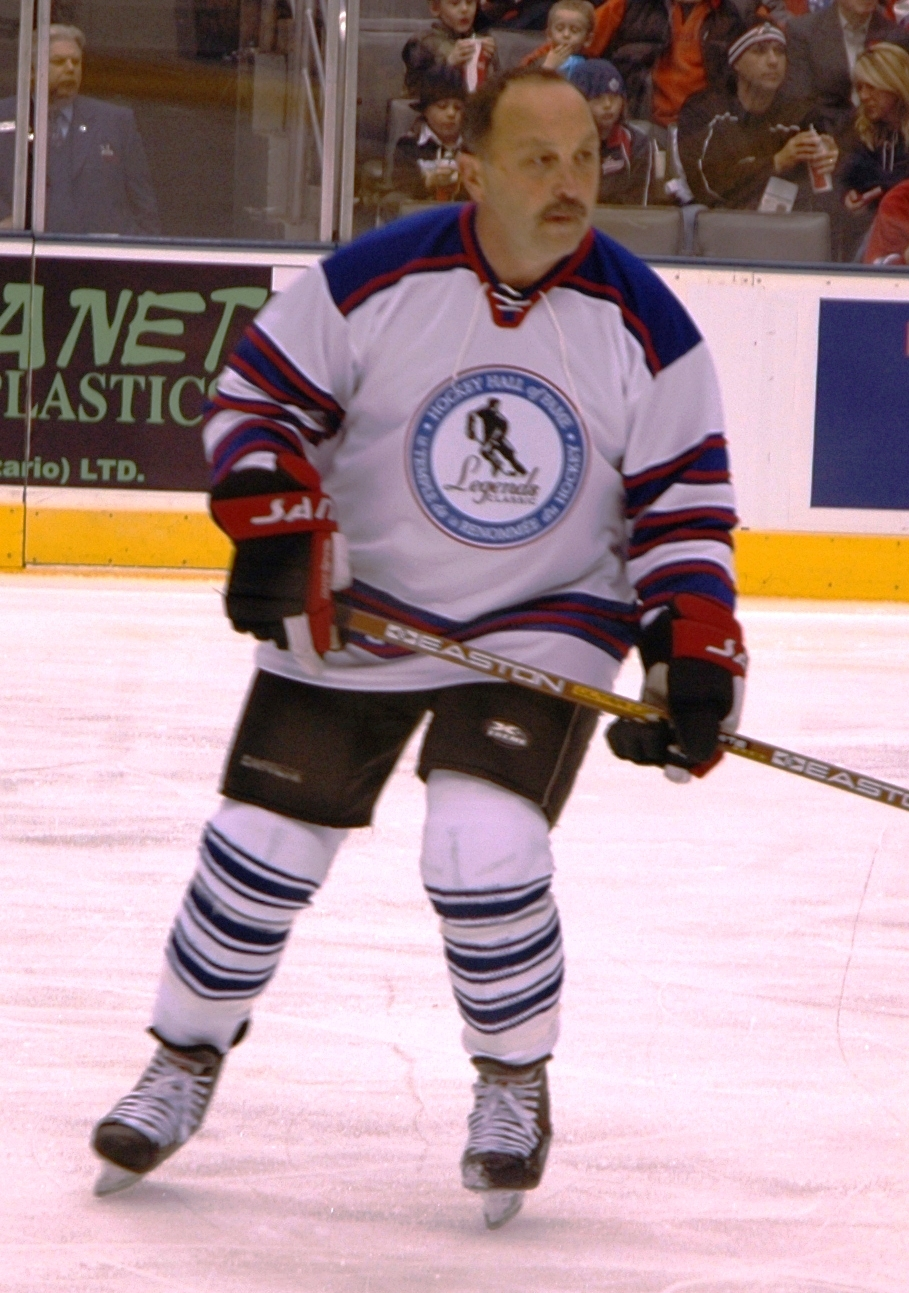
Trottier in 2008

Trottier served as an assistant coach with the Pittsburgh Penguins from 1993 to 1997. He served as head coach of the Portland Pirates of the American Hockey League for the 1997–98 season; the team went 33–33–12–2 in his only season with the Pirates. In 1998, he was hired by the Colorado Avalanche to serve on the coaching staff, where he won his seventh career Stanley Cup in 2001.

Prior to the end of the 2002 Stanley Cup playoffs, Trottier stated his desire to leave the Avalanche for a coaching position and had the endorsement of GM Pierre Lacroix. Reportedly, when approached by the New York Rangers (as managed by GM Glen Sather) with a lengthy questionnaire to potential coaching candidates, Trottier's submission of eighty handwritten pages impressed Sather. On June 6, he was hired by the Rangers to be head coach on a three-year contract. Trottier ultimately did not fare well as a coach for the Rangers, which went 21–26–6–1 (for a .454 winning percentage) in 54 games that saw criticism for his matchups alongside an inability to get along with star players Eric Lindros and Pavel Bure. On the cusp of a three-game losing streak that saw the Rangers outscored by a combined score of 16–5, Trottier was fired on January 29, 2003 by Sather, who served as interim coach for the rest of the season.

On June 1, 2006, Trottier returned to the Islanders as the team's executive director of player development.

On July 29, 2014, Trottier was hired as an assistant coach for the Buffalo Sabres. At the conclusion of the 2014–15 season, his contract was not renewed by the team.

== Legacy ==
Steve Yzerman considered Trottier his favourite player and wore number 19 in his honour. Trottier himself had chosen the number partly in reference to Paul Henderson, who famously wore 19 during the 1972 Summit Series.

Trottier was inducted into the Hockey Hall of Fame in his first year of eligibility in 1997. During his induction speech, Trottier spoke about his mother's encouragement of his pride in his Aboriginal identity.

Lingering bitterness over how his Islanders tenure ended precluded Trottier's number from being honored by the Islanders organization for a few years; it was speculated that Trottier was looking to be compensated to attend a pre-game ceremony, although Trottier denied that claim. A March 2001 meeting with team owner Charles Wang led to a subsequent announcement in August that Trottier's jersey would be retired. The retirement ceremony was held on October 20, 2001 prior to the game against the San Jose Sharks; Trottier was the sixth Islander to have his jersey retired.

As of 2025, Trottier sits 13th all-time with 182 playoff points (71 goals and 111 assists) in 221 games played. Trottier is currently ranked 19th all-time in NHL regular-season points. He is the Islanders' all-time career leader in assists and points, for the regular season and playoffs. In 2023, the New York Post named Trottier as the third best player in team history behind Mike Bossy and Denis Potvin. In 2023, The Athletic named him the 23rd greatest player in modern NHL history.

Canada Post unveiled a postage stamp featuring Trottier on June 17, 2026 as part of a series honoring Canadian Indigenous leaders and advocates in sports.

== Personal life ==
Trottier has four children from two marriages. One of his sons, Dr. Bryan Trottier Jr, became a hematology/oncologist specialist in Minnesota. In September of 1994, feeling lethargic, Trottier went to the doctor and was diagnosed with clinical depression. He went on a ten-day stay at a facility to deal with issues of self-esteem. Following his retirement from playing, Trottier played for the Pittsburgh Phantoms of the Roller Hockey International league in its 1994 season.

After his playing career ended, Trottier returned to his old hobby in music (having played for the family band as a child), which has seen him play the guitar for various NHLPA alumni games alongside festivities for Hockey Day in Canada and even at the Hockey Hall of Fame. Since 2003, he has organized visits to Indigenous communities across Canada with the Aboriginal Alumni Hockey Team. The team has toured across the country to provide ice skating lessons and hockey clinics to youth.

In 2022, Trottier's memoir, All Roads Home: A Life On and Off the Ice was published. He contributed a foreword to Call Me Indian by Fred Sasakamoose, the NHLs first Treaty Indigenous player

One of Bryan's grandsons, Parker Trottier, captained the United States to the gold medal in the men's tournament at the 2024 Winter Youth Olympics.

== Playing statistics ==
=== Regular season and playoffs ===
			Regular season					Playoffs
Season	Team	League	GP	G	A	Pts	PIM	GP	G	A	Pts	PIM
1972–73	Swift Current Broncos	WCHL	67	16	29	45	10	—	—	—	—	—
1973–74	Swift Current Broncos	WCHL	68	41	71	112	76	13	7	8	15	8
1974–75	Lethbridge Broncos	WCHL	67	46	98	144	103	6	2	5	7	14
1975–76	New York Islanders	NHL	80	32	63	95	21	13	1	7	8	8
1976–77	New York Islanders	NHL	76	30	42	72	34	12	2	8	10	2
1977–78	New York Islanders	NHL	77	46	77	123	46	7	0	3	3	4
1978–79	New York Islanders	NHL	76	47	87	134	50	10	2	4	6	13
1979–80	New York Islanders	NHL	78	42	62	104	68	21	12	17	29	16
1980–81	New York Islanders	NHL	73	31	72	103	74	18	11	18	29	34
1981–82	New York Islanders	NHL	80	50	79	129	88	19	6	23	29	40
1982–83	New York Islanders	NHL	80	34	55	89	68	17	8	12	20	18
1983–84	New York Islanders	NHL	68	40	71	111	59	21	8	6	14	29
1984–85	New York Islanders	NHL	68	28	31	59	47	10	4	2	6	8
1985–86	New York Islanders	NHL	78	37	59	96	72	3	1	1	2
1986–87	New York Islanders	NHL	80	23	64	87	50	14	8	4	12	12
1987–88	New York Islanders	NHL	77	30	52	82	48	6	0	0	0	10
1988–89	New York Islanders	NHL	73	17	28	45	44	—	—	—	—	—
1989–90	New York Islanders	NHL	59	13	11	24	29	4	1	0	1	4
1990–91	Pittsburgh Penguins	NHL	52	9	19	28	24	23	3	4	7	29
1991–92	Pittsburgh Penguins	NHL	63	11	18	29	54	21	4	3	7	8
1993–94	Pittsburgh Penguins	NHL	41	4	11	15	36	2	0	0	0	0
NHL totals			1,279	524	901	1,425	912	221	71	112	183	277

=== International ===
Year	Team	Event	Results	GP	G	A	Pts	PIM
1975	Canada	WJC	2nd place, silver medalist(s)	7	5	2	7	—
1981	Canada	CC	2nd	7	3	8	11	6
1984	United States	CC	SF	6	2	3	5	8
Junior totals				7	5	2	7	—
Senior totals				13	5	11	16	14

== Coaching statistics ==
Team	Year	Regular season							Postseason			
Team	Year	G	W	L	T	OTL	Pts	Finish	W	L	Win %	Result
NYR	2002–03	54	21	26	6	1	(49)	(fired)	—	—	—	—
Total		54	21	26	6	1			—	—	—	

== Awards ==
- Western Canada Hockey League All-Star team: 1975
- Stanley Cup champion: 1980, 1981, 1982, and 1983 (all with the New York Islanders), 1991 and 1992 (all with the Pittsburgh Penguins), and 2001 (with the Colorado Avalanche as an assistant coach)
- NHL All-Star Game: 1976, 1978, 1980, 1981, 1982, 1983, 1985, 1986, and 1992
- NHL first All-Star team: 1978 and 1979
- NHL second All-Star team: 1982 and 1984
- Calder Memorial Trophy: 1976
- Art Ross Trophy: 1979
- Hart Memorial Trophy: 1979
- Conn Smythe Trophy: 1980
- King Clancy Memorial Trophy: 1989
- Recipient of the National Aboriginal Achievement Award (now the Indspire Awards) in the sports category: 1998
- Recipient of the Order of Sport, marking induction into Canada's Sports Hall of Fame: 2016
- Inducted into the Saskatchewan Sports Hall of Fame: 1997

== Records and achievements ==
Team records

- Most career games (Islanders) – 1,123
- Most career points (Islanders) – 1,353
- Most career assists (Islanders) – 853
- Most assists in a season (Islanders) – 87 in 1978–79

League records

- Most points in a period (Tied with Mika Zibanejad) – 6 (vs. New York Rangers), December 23, 1978
- Fastest goal to start a game (tied with three others) – 0:05 (vs. Boston Bruins), March 22, 1984
- Most Power Play goals in one game (tied with several others) – 4 (vs. Philadelphia) February 13, 1982

== See also ==
- List of NHL statistical leaders
- List of players with five or more goals in an NHL game
- List of NHL players with 1,000 points
- List of NHL players with 500 goals
- List of NHL players with 1,000 games played

Awards
Preceded by Bob Gainey	Winner of the Conn Smythe Trophy; 1980	Succeeded by Butch Goring
Preceded by Guy Lafleur	Winner of the Hart Memorial Trophy; 1979	Succeeded by Wayne Gretzky
Preceded by Guy Lafleur	Winner of the Art Ross Trophy; 1979	Succeeded by Marcel Dionne
Preceded by Eric Vail	Winner of the Calder Memorial Trophy; 1976	Succeeded by Willi Plett
Preceded by Lanny McDonald	Winner of the King Clancy Memorial Trophy; 1989	Succeeded by Kevin Lowe
Sporting positions
Preceded by Tony Esposito	NHLPA President; October 24, 1984 – November 9, 1992	Succeeded by Doug Wilson
Preceded by Ron Low	Head coach of the New York Rangers; 2002–03	Succeeded by Glen Sather
