= 1983 Stanley Cup playoffs =

Tournament details
- Dates: April 5–May 17, 1983
- Teams: 16
- Defending champions: New York Islanders

Final positions
- Champions: New York Islanders
- Runners-up: Edmonton Oilers

Tournament statistics
- Scoring leader(s): Wayne Gretzky (Oilers) (38 points)

Awards
- MVP: Billy Smith (Islanders)

The 1983 Stanley Cup playoffs, the playoff tournament of the National Hockey League (NHL) began on April 5, after the conclusion of the 1982–83 NHL season. The playoffs concluded on May 17 with the champion New York Islanders defeating the Edmonton Oilers 4–2 to win the final series four games to none and win the Stanley Cup for the fourth consecutive season.

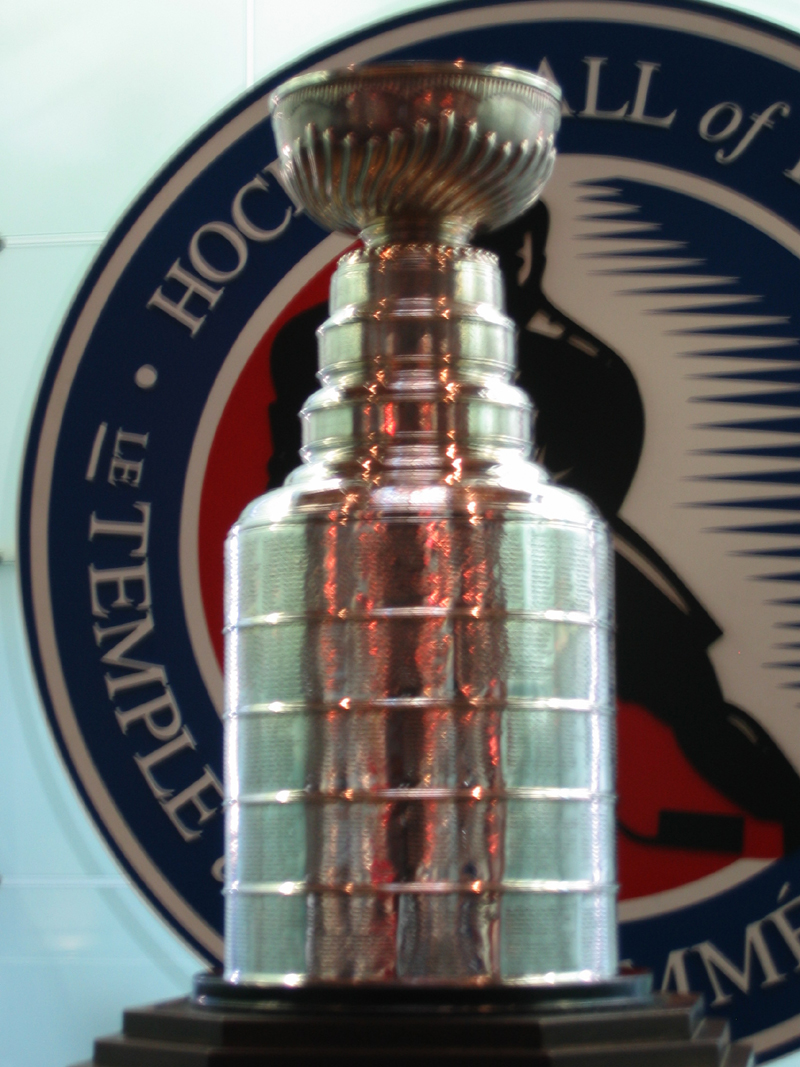
The Stanley Cup

The 1983 playoffs marked the first time that seven NHL teams based in Canada (Montreal, Toronto, Vancouver, Edmonton, Quebec, Winnipeg, and Calgary) all qualified for the playoffs in the same season. Since the 1967–68 expansion, all the Canadian teams have qualified for the playoffs on five other occasions – 1969 (Montreal and Toronto), 1975, 1976 and 1979 (Montreal, Toronto and Vancouver), and 1986 (the same seven as in 1983), the last time to date (as of today) that all active Canadian teams qualified.

In the Wales Conference, the Patrick Division champion Philadelphia Flyers were upset by the New York Rangers in the first round in a three-game sweep. The defending champion Islanders had qualified second in the Patrick Division and defeated the Washington Capitals in the first round in four games and defeated the Rangers in six to qualify for the Conference Final. In the Adams Division, the first place Boston Bruins defeated the Quebec Nordiques and the Buffalo Sabres (who swept the Canadiens in their opening round series) in seven to advance to the Conference Final. In the Conference Final, the Islanders defeated Boston in six games to qualify for their fourth consecutive Cup Finals appearance.

In the Campbell Conference, the Smythe Division first seed Edmonton Oilers swept the Winnipeg Jets in the opening round and defeated the Calgary Flames (who defeated the Vancouver Canucks three games to one in the opening round) in the Smythe Final. The Norris champion Chicago Black Hawks defeated the St. Louis Blues three games to one and the Minnesota North Stars (who defeated the Toronto Maple Leafs three games to one in the opening round) in the Norris Final four games to one. Edmonton defeated the Chicago Black Hawks in a four-game sweep in the Conference Final to advance to the Cup Finals.

== Playoff seeds ==
The top four teams in each division qualified for the playoffs, as follows:

=== Prince of Wales Conference ===
==== Adams Division ====
1. Boston Bruins, Adams Division champions, Prince of Wales Conference regular season champions – 110 points
2. Montreal Canadiens – 98 points
3. Buffalo Sabres – 89 points
4. Quebec Nordiques – 80 points

==== Patrick Division ====
1. Philadelphia Flyers, Patrick Division champions – 106 points
2. New York Islanders – 96 points
3. Washington Capitals – 94 points
4. New York Rangers – 80 points

=== Clarence Campbell Conference ===
==== Norris Division ====
1. Chicago Black Hawks, Norris Division champions – 104 points
2. Minnesota North Stars – 96 points
3. Toronto Maple Leafs – 68 points
4. St. Louis Blues – 65 points

==== Smythe Division ====
1. Edmonton Oilers, Smythe Division champions, Clarence Campbell Conference regular season champions – 106 points
2. Calgary Flames – 78 points
3. Vancouver Canucks – 75 points
4. Winnipeg Jets – 74 points

== Playoff bracket ==
In the division semifinals, the fourth seeded team in each division played against the division winner from their division. The other series matched the second and third place teams from the divisions. The two winning teams from each division's semifinals then met in the division finals. The two division winners of each conference then played in the conference finals. The two conference winners then advanced to the Stanley Cup Final.

Home-ice advantage during the first two rounds was awarded to the team that had the better regular season record. Home-ice advantage for the conference finals had been determined by coin flips prior to the start of the previous season. That event determined that home-ice advantage were granted to champions of the Adams and Smythe divisions this season. Similarly, a puck flip determined that home-ice advantage for the Stanley Cup Final would be granted to Campbell Conference champion this season.

Each division semifinals series was competed in a best-of-five playoff following a 2–2–1 format (scores in the bracket indicate the number of games won in each series), with the team with home ice advantage playing at home for games one and two (and game five, if necessary), and the other team playing at home for game three (and game four, if necessary). In the other three rounds, each series was competed in a best-of-seven playoff following a 2–2–1–1–1 format, with the team with home ice advantage playing at home for games one and two (and games five and seven, if necessary), and the other team playing at home for games three and four (and game six, if necessary).

Division semifinals	Division finals
A1	Boston	3
A4	Quebec	1
A1	Boston	4
A3	Buffalo	3
A2	Montreal	0
A3	Buffalo	3
Prince of Wales Conference
P1	Philadelphia	0
P4	NY Rangers	3
P4	NY Rangers	2
P2	NY Islanders	4
P2	NY Islanders	3
P3	Washington	1
N1	Chicago	3
N4	St. Louis	1
N1	Chicago	4
N2	Minnesota	1
N2	Minnesota	3
N3	Toronto	1
Clarence Campbell Conference
S1	Edmonton	3
S4	Winnipeg	0
S1	Edmonton	4
S2	Calgary	1
S2	Calgary	3
S3	Vancouver	1

Conference finals
A1	Boston	2
P2	NY Islanders	4
N1	Chicago	0
S1	Edmonton	4

Stanley Cup Final
P2	NY Islanders	4
S1	Edmonton	0

== Division semifinals ==
=== Prince of Wales Conference ===
==== (A1) Boston Bruins vs. (A4) Quebec Nordiques ====
This was the second playoff series meeting between these two teams. This was a rematch of the previous year's Adams Division Finals, in which Quebec won in seven games.

April 5	Quebec Nordiques	3–4	OT	Boston Bruins	Boston Garden	Recap
Peter Stastny (1) – 01:26; Peter Stastny (2) – pp – 07:18; Peter Stastny (3) – 16:00		First period		No scoring
No scoring		Second period		03:24 – Barry Pederson (1); 05:54 – pp – Mike O'Connell (1)
No scoring		Third period		08:14 – Mike O'Connell (2)
No scoring		First overtime period		01:46 – Barry Pederson (2)
Dan Bouchard 33 saves / 37 shots		Goalie stats		Pete Peeters 18 saves / 21 shots

April 7	Quebec Nordiques	2–4	Boston Bruins	Boston Garden	Recap
Anton Stastny (1) – 16:33		First period	01:08 – Rick Middleton (1)
No scoring		Second period	No scoring
Dale Hunter (1) – 04:35		Third period	09:59 – Ray Bourque (1); 10:43 – pp – Mike O'Connell (3); 18:00 – Rick Middleton (2)
Dan Bouchard 33 saves / 37 shots		Goalie stats	Pete Peeters 16 saves / 18 shots

April 9	Boston Bruins	1–2	Quebec Nordiques	Colisée de Québec	Recap
No scoring		First period	07:43 – sh – Dale Hunter (2)
Rick Middleton (3) – pp – 04:52		Second period	16:50 – pp – Randy Moller (1)
No scoring		Third period	No scoring
Pete Peeters 26 saves / 28 shots		Goalie stats	Dan Bouchard 31 saves / 32 shots

April 10	Boston Bruins	2–1	Quebec Nordiques	Colisée de Québec	Recap
Barry Pederson (3) – 00:57		First period	No scoring
No scoring		Second period	No scoring
Luc Dufour (1) – 12:02		Third period	03:45 – Anton Stastny (2)
Pete Peeters 38 saves / 39 shots		Goalie stats	Dan Bouchard 13 saves / 15 shots

Boston won series 3–1

==== (A2) Montreal Canadiens vs. (A3) Buffalo Sabres ====
This was the third playoff series meeting between these two teams. The teams split their previous two meetings. They last met in the 1975 Stanley Cup Semifinals, in which Buffalo won in six games.

April 6	Buffalo Sabres	1–0	Montreal Canadiens	Forum de Montréal	Recap
No scoring		First period	No scoring
No scoring		Second period	No scoring
Brent Peterson (1) – 02:30		Third period	No scoring
Bob Sauve 24 saves / 24 shots		Goalie stats	Rick Wamsley 25 saves / 26 shots

April 7	Buffalo Sabres	3–0	Montreal Canadiens	Forum de Montréal	Recap
Dale McCourt (1) – 01:47		First period	No scoring
Gilles Hamel (1) – pp – 06:03; Mal Davis (1) – 06:39		Second period	No scoring
No scoring		Third period	No scoring
Bob Sauve 22 saves / 22 shots		Goalie stats	Rick Wamsley 11 saves / 14 shots Richard Sevigny 7 saves / 7 shots

April 9	Montreal Canadiens	2–4	Buffalo Sabres	Buffalo Memorial Auditorium	Recap
No scoring		First period	No scoring
Mats Naslund (1) – pp – 07:25		Second period	16:21 – pp – John Van Boxmeer (1); 17:26 – Lindy Ruff (1)
Steve Shutt (1) – 08:21		Third period	15:50 – Tony McKegney (1); 19:35 – en – Mike Ramsey (1)
Rick Wamsley 22 saves / 25 shots		Goalie stats	Bob Sauve 28 saves / 30 shots

Buffalo won series 3–0

==== (P1) Philadelphia Flyers vs. (P4) New York Rangers ====
This was the fifth playoff series meeting between these two teams. The teams had split their previous four meetings. This was a rematch of last year's Patrick Division Semifinals, in which New York won 3–1.

April 5	New York Rangers	5–3	Philadelphia Flyers	Spectrum	Recap
Anders Hedberg (1) – 06:06; Mark Pavelich (1) – pp – 15:05; Ander Hedberg (2) – pp – 18:21		First period	No scoring
Mike Backman (1) – 06:23; Eddie Johnstone (1) – 18:44		Second period	09:55 – pp – Ron Flockhart (1)
No scoring		Third period	01:14 – Dave Poulin (1); 17:25 – pp – Bill Barber (1)
Eddie Mio 39 saves / 42 shots		Goalie stats	Pelle Lindbergh 30 saves / 35 shots

April 7	New York Rangers	4–3	Philadelphia Flyers	Spectrum	Recap
No scoring		First period	06:16 – pp – Brian Propp (1)
George McPhee (1) – 02:50; Tom Laidlaw (1) – 07:40		Second period	No scoring
Mark Pavelich (2) – 04:05; Reijo Ruotsalainen (1) – 06:12		Third period	00:51 – Ilkka Sinisalo (1); 11:16 – Tim Kerr (1)
Eddie Mio 32 saves / 35 shots		Goalie stats	Pelle Lindbergh 18 saves / 22 shots

April 9	Philadelphia Flyers	3–9	New York Rangers	Madison Square Garden	Recap
Bobby Clarke (1) – 15:43		First period	04:01 – Rob McClanahan (1); 05:24 – pp – Ron Greschner (1); 19:48 – Barry Beck (1)
No scoring		Second period	03:55 – Rob McClanahan (2); 15:54 – Anders Hedberg (3)
Darryl Sittler (1) – 01:09; Tim Kerr (2) – 06:48		Third period	08:01 – Anders Hedberg (4); 09:34 – pp – Reijo Ruotsalainen (2); 12:12 – Mike Backman (2); 16:49 – Eddie Johnstone (2)
Pelle Lindbergh 19 saves / 28 shots		Goalie stats	Eddie Mio 27 saves / 30 shots

New York won series 3–0

==== (P2) New York Islanders vs. (P3) Washington Capitals ====
This was the first playoff series meeting between these two teams.

April 6	Washington Capitals	2–5	New York Islanders	Nassau Coliseum	Recap
Bobby Gould (1) – pp – 04:01		First period	09:31 – pp – Bryan Trottier (1)
No scoring		Second period	02:46 – pp – Anders Kallur (1); 03:50 – John Tonelli (1); 16:05 – pp – Bryan Trottier (2)
Bobby Gould (2) – 00:19		Third period	08:18 – Bobby Nystrom (1)
Pat Riggin 32 saves / 37 shots		Goalie stats	Billy Smith 27 saves / 29 shots

April 7	Washington Capitals	4–2	New York Islanders	Nassau Coliseum	Recap
No scoring		First period	No scoring
Bobby Gould (3) – 13:46; Dennis Maruk (1) – 18:47		Second period	15:50 – Bobby Nystrom (2)
Bobby Gould (4) – 02:15; Bobby Carpenter (1) – 16:08		Third period	14:29 – Denis Potvin (1)
Al Jensen 30 saves / 32 shots		Goalie stats	Billy Smith 35 saves / 39 shots

April 9	New York Islanders	6–2	Washington Capitals	Capital Centre	Recap
Bob Bourne (1) – 09:31; Bob Bourne (2) – 14:48		First period	No scoring
Bryan Trottier (3) – 12:39; Bryan Trottier (4) – 18:04		Second period	No scoring
John Tonelli (2) – 06:31; Bobby Nystrom (3) – 18:05		Third period	03:04 – Craig Laughlin (1); 17:34 – Scott Stevens (1)
Roland Melanson 26 saves / 28 shots		Goalie stats	Al Jensen 13 saves / 17 shots Pat Riggin 9 saves / 11 shots

April 10	New York Islanders	6–3	Washington Capitals	Capital Centre	Recap
Mike Bossy (1) – 02:10		First period	No scoring
Bob Bourne (3) – 06:41; Mike Bossy (2) – 09:53; Mats Hallin (1) – 10:37		Second period	03:13 – Gaetan Duchesne (1); 16:58 – Bobby Gould (5)
Mike Bossy (3) – 17:14; John Tonelli (3) – en – 18:49		Third period	11:34 – Ken Houston (1)
Roland Melanson 28 saves / 31 shots		Goalie stats	Al Jensen 23 saves / 27 shots Pat Riggin 8 saves / 9 shots

New York won series 3–1

=== Clarence Campbell Conference ===
==== (N1) Chicago Black Hawks vs. (N4) St. Louis Blues ====
This was the fourth playoff series meeting between these two teams. Chicago won all three previous meetings. This was a rematch of last year's Norris Division Finals, in which Chicago won in six games.

April 6	St. Louis Blues	4–2	Chicago Black Hawks	Chicago Stadium	Recap
No scoring		First period	03:24 – Tom Lysiak (1)
No scoring		Second period	05:19 – pp – Steve Larmer (1)
Brian Sutter (1) – pp – 03:08; Blake Dunlop (1) – pp – 08:38; Mike Zuke (1) – 11:35; Larry Patey (1) – en – 19:59		Third period	No scoring
Mike Liut 30 saves / 32 shots		Goalie stats	Murray Bannerman 25 saves / 28 shots

April 7	St. Louis Blues	2–7	Chicago Black Hawks	Chicago Stadium	Recap
No scoring		First period	05:09 – Denis Savard (1); 09:23 – Rich Preston (1); 13:00 – Tom Lysiak (2); 17:34 – pp – Denis Savard (2)
Jorgen Pettersson (1) – pp – 15:22; Perry Turnbull (1) – 19:26		Second period	No scoring
No scoring		Third period	02:30 – Steve Ludzik (1); 09:36 – Curt Fraser (1); 16:20 – Darryl Sutter (1)
Mike Liut 39 saves / 46 shots		Goalie stats	Tony Esposito 24 saves / 26 shots

April 9	Chicago Black Hawks	2–1	St. Louis Blues	Checkerdome	Recap
Doug Wilson (1) – 14:25; Denis Savard (3) – 18:22		First period	No scoring
No scoring		Second period	No scoring
No scoring		Third period	02:49 – Mark Reeds (1)
Murray Bannerman 26 saves / 26 shots		Goalie stats	Mike Liut 25 saves / 27 shots

April 10	Chicago Black Hawks	5–3	St. Louis Blues	Checkerdome	Recap
Tim Higgins (1) – 03:15; Dave Feamster (1) – 08:31		First period	12:16 – Bernie Federko (1); 17:13 – pp – Brian Sutter (2)
Steve Ludzik (2) – 03:47		Second period	No scoring
Steve Larmer (2) – pp – 09:39; Darryl Sutter (2) – en – 19:26		Third period	05:48 – pp – Bernie Federko (2)
Murray Bannerman 32 saves / 35 shots		Goalie stats	Mike Liut 39 saves / 43 shots

Chicago won series 3–1

==== (N2) Minnesota North Stars vs. (N3) Toronto Maple Leafs ====
This was the second playoff series meeting between these two teams. Minnesota won the only previous meeting in the 1980 preliminary round in a three-game sweep.

April 6	Toronto Maple Leafs	4–5	Minnesota North Stars	Met Center	Recap
Gaston Gingras (1) – 07:37		First period	00:34 – Brian Bellows (1); 12:36 – Dino Ciccarelli (1)
Borje Salming (1) – pp – 00:59		Second period	15:18 – pp – Neal Broten (1)
Jim Benning (1) – 00:44; Walt Poddubny (1) – pp – 14:36		Third period	06:35 – Brad Maxwell (1); 19:38 – pp – Bobby Smith (1)
Mike Palmateer 40 saves / 44 shots Rick St. Croix 0 saves / 1 shot		Goalie stats	Don Beaupre 27 saves / 31 shots

April 7	Toronto Maple Leafs	4–5	OT	Minnesota North Stars	Met Center	Recap
Miroslav Frycer (1) – 01:05; Bill Derlago (1) – pp – 07:48		First period		18:43 – Steve Payne (1)
Walt Poddubny (2) – 14:51		Second period		03:43 – Ron Friest (1); 09:29 – Gordie Roberts (1)
Dave Shand (1) – 08:01		Third period		17:32 – Bobby Smith (2)
No scoring		First overtime period		05:03 – Bobby Smith (3)
Mike Palmateer 40 saves / 45 shots		Goalie stats		Don Beaupre 35 saves / 39 shots

April 9	Minnesota North Stars	3–6	Toronto Maple Leafs	Maple Leaf Gardens	Recap
No scoring		First period	06:49 – Greg Terrion (1)
Brad Maxwell (2) – pp – 05:35; Brian Bellows (2) – 13:03; Steve Payne (2) – 16:08		Second period	10:59 – pp – John Anderson (1); 15:46 – Miroslav Frycer (2)
No scoring		Third period	05:51 – pp – Walt Poddubny (3); 10:42 – Bruce Boudreau (1); 18:53 – en – John Anderson (2)
Don Beaupre 32 saves / 37 shots		Goalie stats	Mike Palmateer 47 saves / 50 shots

April 10	Minnesota North Stars	5–4	OT	Toronto Maple Leafs	Maple Leaf Gardens	Recap
No scoring		First period		No scoring
Brad Maxwell (3) – pp – 10:59		Second period		05:17 – pp – Bill Derlago (2); 19:17 – Bill Derlago (3)
Bobby Smith (4) – 00:12; Brian Bellows (3) – pp – 10:41; Brian Bellows (4) – 19:38		Third period		06:22 – Rick Vaive (1); 17:13 – Rick Vaive (2)
Dino Ciccarelli (2) – 08:05		First overtime period		No scoring
Gilles Meloche 23 saves / 27 shots		Goalie stats		Mike Palmateer 38 saves / 43 shots

Minnesota won series 3–1

==== (S1) Edmonton Oilers vs. (S4) Winnipeg Jets ====
This was the first playoff meeting between these two teams. This was the first playoff series to feature two former WHA teams.

April 6	Winnipeg Jets	3–6	Edmonton Oilers	Northlands Coliseum	Recap
Brian Mullen (1) – 17:51		First period	14:10 – Ken Linseman (1); 14:17 – Dave Hunter (1); 15:58 – sh – Wayne Gretzky (1)
No scoring		Second period	00:09 – pp – Wayne Gretzky (2); 05:52 – Wayne Gretzky (3); 12:48 – sh – Wayne Gretzky (4)
Bryan Maxwell (1) – pp – 06:13; Ron Wilson (1) – 11:16		Third period	No scoring
Brian Hayward 20 saves / 26 shots Doug Soetaert 10 saves / 10 shots		Goalie stats	Andy Moog 26 saves / 29 shots

April 7	Winnipeg Jets	3–4	Edmonton Oilers	Northlands Coliseum	Recap
Moe Mantha (1) – pp – 04:51; Norm Dupont (1) – pp – 09:12		First period	07:40 – pp – Mark Messier (1); 14:53 – Ken Linseman (2)
No scoring		Second period	No scoring
Moe Mantha (2) – pp – 03:26		Third period	02:57 – sh – Paul Coffey (1); 18:16 – Mark Messier (2)
Brian Hayward 23 saves / 27 shots		Goalie stats	Andy Moog 25 saves / 28 shots

April 9	Edmonton Oilers	4–3	Winnipeg Jets	Winnipeg Arena	Recap
Paul Coffey (2) – 07:59		First period	17:59 – pp – Paul MacLean (1)
No scoring		Second period	06:56 – pp – Dale Hawerchuk (1)
Kevin Lowe (1) – 14:04; Willy Lindstrom (1) – 17:08; Ken Linseman (3) – 18:46		Third period	17:38 – Ron Wilson (2)
Andy Moog 26 saves / 29 shots		Goalie stats	Brian Hayward 27 saves / 31 shots

Edmonton won series 3–0

==== (S2) Calgary Flames vs. (S3) Vancouver Canucks ====
This was the second playoff series meeting between these two teams. This was a rematch of last year's Smythe Division Semifinals, in which Vancouver won in a three-game sweep.

April 6	Vancouver Canucks	3–4	OT	Calgary Flames	Stampede Corral	Recap
No scoring		First period		10:24 – Guy Chouinard (1)
Stan Smyl (1) – 08:59; Gary Lupul (1) – 13:12		Second period		No scoring
Doug Halward (1) – 02:14		Third period		04:45 – Phil Russell (1); 09:25 – Jim Peplinski (1)
No scoring		First overtime period		12:27 – Eddy Beers (1)
Richard Brodeur 34 saves / 38 shots		Goalie stats		Don Edwards 20 saves / 23 shots Rejean Lemelin 10 saves / 10 shots

April 7	Vancouver Canucks	4–5	Calgary Flames	Stampede Corral	Recap
Thomas Gradin (1) – 05:38		First period	No scoring
No scoring		Second period	08:18 – pp – Lanny McDonald (1); 15:20 – Steve Konroyd (1)
Ivan Hlinka (1) – 06:52; Lars Lindgren (1) – 18:05		Third period	03:55 – Lanny McDonald (2); 04:43 – Jim Jackson (1); 14:42 – pp – Mel Bridgman (1)
Richard Brodeur 18 saves / 23 shots		Goalie stats	Rejean Lemelin 21 saves / 24 shots

April 9	Calgary Flames	4–5	Vancouver Canucks	Pacific Coliseum	Recap
No scoring		First period	No scoring
Kent Nilsson (1) – pp – 11:53; Kevin LaVallee (1) – 16:43		Second period	01:51 – Harold Snepsts (1); 03:05 – Rick Lanz (1); 10:29 – Kevin McCarthy (1); 13:13 – pp – Rick Lanz (2)
Richie Dunn (1) – 08:00; Mel Bridgman (2) – 15:57		Third period	19:03 – Stan Smyl (2)
Rejean Lemelin 33 saves / 38 shots		Goalie stats	John Garrett 26 saves / 30 shots

April 10	Calgary Flames	4–3	OT	Vancouver Canucks	Pacific Coliseum	Recap
Greg Meredith (1) – 15:07		First period		No scoring
Doug Risebrough (1) – 16:00; Tim Hunter (1) – pp – 17:33		Second period		12:16 – Mark Kirton (1); 13:56 – pp – Stan Smyl (3)
No scoring		Third period		17:38 – Garth Butcher (1)
Gregory Meredith (2) – 01:06		First overtime period		No scoring
Rejean Lemelin 33 saves / 36 shots		Goalie stats		Richard Brodeur 21 saves / 25 shots

Calgary won series 3–1

== Division finals ==
=== Prince of Wales Conference ===
==== (A1) Boston Bruins vs. (A3) Buffalo Sabres ====
This was the second playoff series meeting between the two teams. This was a rematch of last year's Adams Division Semifinals, in which Boston won 3–1.

Rick Middleton set an NHL record for most points in one series with 19 (5 goals and 14 assists).

Brad Park scored the game-winner in game seven on a slapshot off a rebound of his own shot just seconds earlier.

April 14	Buffalo Sabres	7–4	Boston Bruins	Boston Garden	Recap
Mike Ramsey (2) – 16:33		First period	04:49 – Ray Bourque (2); 10:51 – pp – Barry Pederson (4)
Lindy Ruff (2) – 01:17; Lindy Ruff (3) – 02:19; Tony McKegney (2) – 09:37; Tony McKegney (3) – pp – 15:35		Second period	00:40 – Peter McNab (1)
Craig Ramsay (1) – 01:08; Gilles Hamel (2) – 03:27		Third period	17:44 – Steve Kasper (1)
Bob Sauve 12 saves / 16 shots		Goalie stats	Pete Peeters 22 saves / 29 shots

April 15	Buffalo Sabres	3–5	Boston Bruins	Boston Garden	Recap
No scoring		First period	00:52 – Mike Krushelnyski (1); 10:30 – Rick Middleton (4)
No scoring		Second period	12:05 – pp – Keith Crowder (1); 19:36 – Ray Bourque (3)
Phil Housley (1) – 12:19; Mike Ramsey (3) – 15:03; Mike Foligno (1) – 16:01		Third period	12:45 – Mike Krushelnyski (2)
Bob Sauve 29 saves / 34 shots		Goalie stats	Pete Peeters 37 saves / 40 shots

April 17	Boston Bruins	3–4	Buffalo Sabres	Buffalo Memorial Auditorium	Recap
No scoring		First period	03:57 – Craig Ramsay (2)
Bruce Crowder (1) – 06:14; Tom Fergus (1) – 07:47		Second period	09:16 – pp – Dale McCourt (2)
Barry Pederson (5) – 05:59		Third period	04:25 – Dave Andreychuk (1); 17:02 – Mike Ramsey (4)
Pete Peeters 20 saves / 24 shots		Goalie stats	Bob Sauve 21 saves / 24 shots

April 18	Boston Bruins	6–2	Buffalo Sabres	Buffalo Memorial Auditorium	Recap
Rick Middleton (5) – 05:00; Barry Pederson (6) – 12:49		First period	14:53 – pp – Paul Cyr (1)
Rick Middleton (6) – 12:04		Second period	06:09 – pp – Dale McCourt (3)
Mike Krushelnyski (3) – 00:31; Barry Pederson (7) – 12:48; Mike Gillis (1) – 17:29		Third period	No scoring
Pete Peeters 26 saves / 28 shots		Goalie stats	Bob Sauve 22 saves / 28 shots

April 20	Buffalo Sabres	0–9	Boston Bruins	Boston Garden	Recap
No scoring		First period	02:16 – Bruce Crowder (2); 03:14 – pp – Rick Middleton (7); 13:00 – Barry Pederson (8); 14:51 – sh Rick Middleton (8); 18:50 – Mike Krushelnyski (4)
No scoring		Second period	07:08 – Barry Pederson (9); 16:00 – Gord Kluzak (1)
No scoring		Third period	07:04 – sh – Steve Kasper (2); 17:15 – Peter McNab (2)
Phil Myre 22 saves / 29 shots Bob Sauve 0 saves / 2 shots		Goalie stats	Pete Peeters 27 saves / 27 shots

April 22	Boston Bruins	3–5	Buffalo Sabres	Buffalo Memorial Auditorium	Recap
Brad Park (1) – 09:45; Tom Fergus (2) – 10:17		First period	19:34 – pp – Phil Housley (2)
No scoring		Second period	01:25 – Hannu Virta (1); 16:39 – Mike Foligno (2)
Mike Krushelnyski (5) – 08:36		Third period	09:25 – Lindy Ruff (4); 13:15 – Phil Housley (3)
Pete Peeters 22 saves / 27 shots		Goalie stats	Bob Sauve 22 saves / 25 shots

April 24	Buffalo Sabres	2–3	OT	Boston Bruins	Boston Garden	Recap
Ric Seiling (1) – 10:42		First period		No scoring
Ric Seiling (2) – 03:50		Second period		06:32 – Barry Pederson (10); 09:21 – pp – Brad Park (2)
No scoring		Third period		No scoring
No scoring		First overtime period		01:52 – Brad Park (3)
Bob Sauve 26 saves / 29 shots		Goalie stats		Pete Peeters 20 saves / 22 shots

Boston won series 4–3

==== (P2) New York Islanders vs. (P4) New York Rangers ====
This was the fifth playoff series meeting between these two teams. The Islanders won three of the previous four series, including both over the past two seasons. The latter of which the Islanders won in six games in the last year's Patrick Division Finals.

April 14	New York Rangers	1–4	New York Islanders	Nassau Coliseum	Recap
Ron Greschner (2) – pp – 13:01		First period	No Scoring
No Scoring		Second period	05:43 – pp – Stefan Persson (1)
No Scoring		Third period	01:44 – Denis Potvin (2); 04:27 – Brent Sutter (1); 08:05 – pp – Duane Sutter (1)
Eddie Mio 29 saves / 33 shots		Goalie stats	Billy Smith 19 saves / 20 shots

April 15	New York Rangers	0–5	New York Islanders	Nassau Coliseum	Recap
No Scoring		First period	00:54 – John Tonelli (4); 08:10 – pp – Duane Sutter (2); 15:33 – Duane Sutter (3)
No Scoring		Second period	08:02 – pp – Brent Sutter (2); 15:26 – Duane Sutter (4)
No Scoring		Third period	No Scoring
Glen Hanlon 42 saves / 47 shots		Goalie stats	Billy Smith 23 saves / 23 shots

April 17	New York Islanders	6–7	New York Rangers	Madison Square Garden	Recap
05:06 – pp – Mike Bossy (4); 11:03 – sh – Bob Bourne (4)		First period	George McPhee (2) – pp – 07:14; Eddie Johnstone (3) – pp – 08:46; Ron Duguay (1) – 13:08; Barry Beck (2) – 17:45
No Scoring		Second period	Dave Maloney (1) – 02:11; Eddie Johnstone (4) – sh – 04:12; Mark Pavelich (3) – pp – 13:20
02:33 – sh – Billy Carroll (1); 04:55 – Mike Bossy (5); 08:36 – sh – Anders Kallur (2); 19:17 – pp – Denis Potvin (3)		Third period	No Scoring
Billy Smith 18 saves / 23 shots Roland Melanson 17 saves / 19 shots		Goalie stats	Eddie Mio 27 saves / 33 shots

April 18	New York Islanders	1–3	New York Rangers	Madison Square Garden	Recap
No scoring		First period	George McPhee (3) – 02:51
No scoring		Second period	No scoring
18:22 – Greg Gilbert (1)		Third period	Mark Pavelich (4) – 10:40; Reijo Ruotsalainen (3) – 12:44
Roland Melanson 19 saves / 22 shots		Goalie stats	Eddie Mio 36 saves / 37 shots

April 20	New York Rangers	2–7	New York Islanders	Nassau Coliseum	Recap
18:45 – Reijo Ruotsalainen (4)		First period	Bryan Trottier (5) – 13:18
19:40 – Robbie Ftorek (1)		Second period	Mike Bossy (6) – pp – 04:01; Gord Lane (1) – 09:22; Duane Sutter (5) – 11:42; Bob Bourne (5) – 18:35
No scoring		Third period	Brent Sutter (3) – 02:32; Denis Potvin (4) – 10:20
Eddie Mio 36 saves / 43 shots		Goalie stats	Billy Smith 18 saves / 20 shots

April 22	New York Islanders	5–2	New York Rangers	Madison Square Garden	Recap
No scoring		First period	Ron Duguay (2) – 12:45
03:02 – John Tonelli (5); 05:03 – Butch Goring (1)		Second period	09:31 – pp – Mikko Leinonen (1)
05:21 – Butch Goring (2); 08:09 – Brent Sutter (4); 14:09 – Ken Morrow (1)		Third period	No scoring
Billy Smith 28 saves / 30 shots		Goalie stats	Eddie Mio 39 saves / 44 shots

New York Islanders won series 4–2

=== Clarence Campbell Conference ===
==== (N1) Chicago Black Hawks vs. (N2) Minnesota North Stars ====
This was the second playoff series meeting between these two teams. This was a rematch of last year's Norris Division Semifinals, in which Chicago won in an upset 3–1.

April 14	Minnesota North Stars	2–5	Chicago Black Hawks	Chicago Stadium	Recap
No scoring		First period	No scoring
Tom McCarthy (1) – 08:31; Bobby Smith (5) – pp – 13:17		Second period	08:00 – Steve Ludzik (3); 18:52 – Doug Crossman (1)
No scoring		Third period	13:06 – Curt Fraser (2); 17:41 – Denis Savard (4); 19:14 – en – Doug Wilson (2)
Gilles Meloche 23 saves / 27 shots		Goalie stats	Murray Bannerman 27 saves / 29 shots

April 15	Minnesota North Stars	4–7	Chicago Black Hawks	Chicago Stadium	Recap
No scoring		First period	05:46 – Al Secord (1); 16:10 – Steve Larmer (3); 17:18 – pp – Doug Crossman (2)
Craig Hartsburg (1) – pp – 12:56; Al MacAdam (1) – 16:44		Second period	06:06 – pp – Bob Murray (1); 06:41 – Tom Lysiak (3)
Dino Ciccarelli (3) – 03:47; Willi Plett (1) – pp – 17:14		Third period	11:56 – Denis Savard (5); 16:26 – Denis Savard (6)
Don Beaupre 22 saves / 29 shots		Goalie stats	Murray Bannerman 24 saves / 28 shots

April 17	Chicago Black Hawks	1–5	Minnesota North Stars	Met Center	Recap
No scoring		First period	13:51 – Al MacAdam (2); 17:36 – pp – Dino Ciccarelli (4)
Al Secord (2) – 14:00		Second period	No scoring
No scoring		Third period	01:54 – Craig Hartsburg (2); 03:07 – pp – Bobby Smith (6); 18:35 – pp – Steve Payne (3)
Murray Bannerman 31 saves / 36 shots		Goalie stats	Gilles Meloche 24 saves / 25 shots

April 18	Chicago Black Hawks	4–3	OT	Minnesota North Stars	Met Center	Recap
No scoring		First period		13:05 – pp – Brian Bellows (5)
Tom Lysiak (4) – pp – 13:02; Doug Wilson (3) – 18:29		Second period		01:12 – pp – Craig Hartsburg (3); 10:50 – Brad Maxwell (4)
Tom Lysiak (5) – 02:27		Third period		No scoring
Rich Preston (2) – 10:34		First overtime period		No scoring
Tony Esposito 30 saves / 33 shots		Goalie stats		Gilles Meloche 34 saves / 38 shots

April 20	Minnesota North Stars	2–5	Chicago Black Hawks	Chicago Stadium	Recap
No scoring		First period	07:24 – pp – Denis Savard (7); 19:22 – sh – Doug Wilson (4)
Brad Maxwell (5) – 10:22		Second period	04:13 – sh – Rick Paterson (1); 15:07 – Darryl Sutter (3)
Tom McCarthy (2) – 09:12		Third period	09:45 – Curt Fraser (3)
Gilles Meloche 30 saves / 35 shots		Goalie stats	Tony Esposito 37 saves / 39 shots

Chicago won series 4–1

==== (S1) Edmonton Oilers vs. (S2) Calgary Flames ====
This was the first playoff series meeting between these two teams.

Game four was the last game played at Stampede Corral.

Edmonton scored 35 goals in this series, which is an all-time record for goals scored by a team in a 5-game series.

April 14	Calgary Flames	3–6	Edmonton Oilers	Northlands Coliseum	Recap
No scoring		First period	01:38 – Mark Messier (3); 17:12 – pp – Mark Messier (4)
Paul Reinhart (1) – pp – 06:26		Second period	No scoring
Paul Reinhart (2) – pp – 10:04; Paul Reinhart (3) – sh – 13:01		Third period	02:00 – Mark Messier (5); 02:08 – Pat Hughes (1); 07:30 – Paul Coffey (3); 08:58 – sh – Mark Messier (6)
Rejean Lemelin 27 saves / 33 shots		Goalie stats	Andy Moog 33 saves / 36 shots

April 15	Calgary Flames	1–5	Edmonton Oilers	Northlands Coliseum	Recap
Kari Eloranta (1) – 04:36		First period	00:31 – Jari Kurri (1); 15:23 – Randy Gregg (1); 18:29 – Don Jackson (1)
No scoring		Second period	No scoring
No scoring		Third period	06:06 – pp – Paul Coffey (4); 13:45 – pp – Willy Lindstrom (2)
Don Edwards 33 saves / 38 shots		Goalie stats	Andy Moog 26 saves / 27 shots

April 17	Edmonton Oilers	10–2	Calgary Flames	Stampede Corral	Recap
Paul Coffey (5) – sh- 08:18; Wayne Gretzky (5) – 13:42; Wayne Gretzky (6) – 14:37		First period	13:57 – Paul Reinhart (4)
Glenn Anderson (1) – 00:36; Wayne Gretzky (7) – sh – 04:23; Mark Messier (7) – 14:53; Wayne Gretzky (8) – 19:06		Second period	16:44 – Kari Jalonen (1)
Mark Messier (8) – sh – 09:10; Ray Cote (1) – 13:16; Mark Messier (9) – 18:40		Third period	No scoring
Andy Moog 15 saves / 17 shots Grant Fuhr 4 saves / 4 shots		Goalie stats	Rejean Lemelin 15 saves / 22 shots Don Edwards 6 saves / 9 shots

April 18	Edmonton Oilers	5–6	Calgary Flames	Stampede Corral	Recap
Jari Kurri (2) – pp – 08:20; Wayne Gretzky (9) – 13:19		First period	06:05 – pp – Paul Reinhart (5); 11:32 – Lanny McDonald (3)
No scoring		Second period	12:17 – pp – Paul Reinhart (6); 17:40 – Jim Jackson (2)
Ken Linseman (4) – pp – 10:08; Ken Linseman (5) – 12:45; Tom Roulston (1) – 17:32		Third period	02:56 – pp – Mel Bridgman (3); 09:50 – sh – Greg Meredith (3)
Andy Moog 27 saves / 33 shots		Goalie stats	Don Edwards 28 saves / 33 shots

April 20	Calgary Flames	1–9	Edmonton Oilers	Northlands Coliseum	Recap
No scoring		First period	12:09 – pp – Paul Coffey (6); 17:40 – Mark Messier (10)
No scoring		Second period	01:39 – Paul Coffey (7); 03:42 – sh – Randy Gregg (2); 07:03 – Pat Hughes (2); 15:16 – Don Jackson (2); 16:27 – Wayne Gretzky (10)
Steve Konroyd (2) – 09:32		Third period	13:49 – Glenn Anderson (2); 18:53 – Ray Cote (2)
Don Edwards 15 saves / 21 shots Rejean Lemelin 18 saves / 21 shots		Goalie stats	Andy Moog 39 saves / 40 shots

Edmonton won series 4–1

== Conference finals ==
=== Prince of Wales Conference final ===
==== (A1) Boston Bruins vs. (P2) New York Islanders ====
This was the second playoff series meeting between these two teams. New York won the only previous meeting in five games in the 1980 Stanley Cup Quarterfinals.

April 26	New York Islanders	5–2	Boston Bruins	Boston Garden	Recap
Brent Sutter (5) – 03:36		First period	No scoring
Tomas Jonsson (1) – 08:37; Mike Bossy (7) – pp – 14:08; Duane Sutter (6) – 15:15		Second period	No scoring
Bob Bourne (6) – 17:27		Third period	05:51 – Barry Pederson (11); 06:08 – Ray Bourque (4)
Billy Smith 30 saves / 32 shots		Goalie stats	Pete Peeters 29 saves / 34 shots

April 28	New York Islanders	1–4	Boston Bruins	Boston Garden	Recap
No scoring		First period	03:05 – pp – Mike Krushelnyski (6); 16:33 – sh – Brad Palmer (1)
Denis Potvin (5) – pp – 03:57		Second period	16:51 – sh – Barry Pederson (12)
No scoring		Third period	10:15 – Barry Pederson (13)
Billy Smith 27 saves / 31 shots		Goalie stats	Pete Peeters 32 saves / 33 shots

April 30	Boston Bruins	3–7	New York Islanders	Nassau Coliseum	Recap
Craig MacTavish (1) – 04:28		First period	03:00 – Bobby Nystrom (4); 08:39 – pp – Brent Sutter (6); 13:21 – Bryan Trottier (6)
Ray Bourque (5) – pp – 06:53		Second period	16:27 – pp – Mike Bossy (8)
Ray Bourque (6) – 01:24		Third period	05:06 – Ken Morrow (2); 17:56 – pp – Denis Potvin (6); 19:04 – Butch Goring (3)
Pete Peeters 19 saves / 26 shots		Goalie stats	Billy Smith 33 saves / 36 shots

May 3	Boston Bruins	3–8	New York Islanders	Nassau Coliseum	Recap
Mike Krushelnyski (7) – pp – 04:21; Mike Krushelnyski (8) – 16:07		First period	07:23 – John Tonelli (6); 10:04 – Denis Potvin (7)
No scoring		Second period	04:05 – Mike Bossy (9)
Rick Middleton (9) – pp – 12:41		Third period	02:53 – Mike Bossy (10); 05:25 – Duane Sutter (7); 06:41 – pp – Mike Bossy (11); 08:12 – pp – Denis Potvin (8); 08:52 – Bobby Nystrom (5)
Pete Peeters 23 saves / 31 shots		Goalie stats	Billy Smith 27 saves / 30 shots

May 5	New York Islanders	1–5	Boston Bruins	Boston Garden	Recap
Bobby Nystrom (6) – 03:12		First period	05:07 – Craig MacTavish (2); 06:15 – Barry Pederson (14)
No scoring		Second period	09:29 – pp – Ray Bourque (7); 12:06 – Peter McNab (3); 19:27 – Bruce Crowder (3)
No scoring		Third period	No scoring
Billy Smith 28 saves / 33 shots Roland Melanson 12 saves / 12 shots		Goalie stats	Pete Peeters 21 saves / 22 shots

May 7	Boston Bruins	4–8	New York Islanders	Nassau Coliseum	Recap
Rick Middleton (10) – 10:42; Craig MacTavish (3) – 16:34		First period	00:33 – Butch Goring (4); 08:09 – pp – Mike Bossy (12); 19:36 – Brent Sutter (7)
Ray Bourque (8) – 05:01; Rick Middleton (11) – pp – 17:39		Second period	00:59 – Mike Bossy (13); 05:51 – Mike Bossy (14); 10:03 – Mike Bossy (15); 13:14 – Bryan Trottier (7)
No scoring		Third period	07:41 – Wayne Merrick (1)
Pete Peeters 24 saves / 32 shots		Goalie stats	Billy Smith 16 saves / 20 shots

New York won series 4–2

=== Clarence Campbell Conference final ===
==== (S1) Edmonton Oilers vs. (N1) Chicago Black Hawks ====
This was the first playoff series meeting between these two teams.

April 24	Chicago Black Hawks	4–8	Edmonton Oilers	Northlands Coliseum	Recap
Al Secord (3) – 13:38		First period	18:17 – Ray Cote (3)
No scoring		Second period	01:13 – Dave Hunter (2); 06:58 – Ken Linseman (6); 07:47 – Glenn Anderson (3); 12:59 – pp – Wayne Gretzky (11)
Doug Crossman (3) – 03:06; Al Secord (4) – pp – 11:53; Bill Gardner (1) – pp – 18:43		Third period	00:25 – pp – Mark Messier (11); 12:17 – sh – Jari Kurri (3); 14:52 – sh – Jari Kurri (4)
Tony Esposito 28 saves / 36 shots		Goalie stats	Andy Moog 24 saves / 28 shots

April 26	Chicago Black Hawks	2–8	Edmonton Oilers	Northlands Coliseum	Recap
Bob Murray (2) – 02:54; Tom Lysiak (6) – pp – 11:07		First period	03:58 – Mark Messier (12); 06:39 – Mark Messier (13); 11:50 – Glenn Anderson (4); 18:15 – Glenn Anderson (5)
No scoring		Second period	No scoring
No scoring		Third period	00:35 – Dave Hunter (3); 08:47 – Glenn Anderson (6); 15:09 – pp – Mark Messier (14); 15:54 – Glenn Anderson (7)
Murray Bannerman 19 saves / 27 shots		Goalie stats	Andy Moog 26 saves / 28 shots

May 1	Edmonton Oilers	3–2	Chicago Black Hawks	Chicago Stadium	Recap
No scoring		First period	No scoring
Charlie Huddy (1) – 04:18; Don Jackson (3) – 11:52		Second period	No scoring
Glenn Anderson (8) – 13:05		Third period	03:49 – Steve Larmer (4); 07:56 – pp – Denis Savard (8)
Andy Moog 39 saves / 41 shots		Goalie stats	Tony Esposito 25 saves / 28 shots

May 3	Edmonton Oilers	6–3	Chicago Black Hawks	Chicago Stadium	Recap
Wayne Gretzky (12) – 02:46; Jaroslav Pouzar (1) – pp – 03:46; Glenn Anderson (9) – pp – 15:01; Jaroslav Pouzar (2) – 16:49		First period	17:12 – Darryl Sutter (4)
Jari Kurri (5) – 02:38; Dave Hunter (4) – 18:20		Second period	04:51 – Steve Larmer (5)
No scoring		Third period	11:23 – pp – Curt Fraser (4)
Andy Moog 21 saves / 24 shots		Goalie stats	Murray Bannerman 23 saves / 29 shots

Edmonton won series 4–0

== Stanley Cup Final ==
This was the second playoff meeting between these two teams. Their only previous meeting was in the 1981 Stanley Cup Quarterfinals, which New York won in six games. This was the Oilers' first Final appearance in their fourth season since entering the league in 1979–80; they also became the first former WHA team to make the Final after the NHL–WHA merger in 1979. New York made their fourth consecutive and overall Stanley Cup Final appearance; they won in the previous year sweeping the Vancouver Canucks in four games. The Oilers became the first team to represent Edmonton in the Finals since the 1922–23 Edmonton Eskimos who were defeated by the original Ottawa Senators. New York won all three games in this year's regular season series.

May 10	New York Islanders	2–0	Edmonton Oilers	Northlands Coliseum	Recap
Duane Sutter (8) – 05:36		First period	No scoring
No scoring		Second period	No scoring
Ken Morrow (3) – en – 19:48		Third period	No scoring
Billy Smith 35 saves / 35 shots		Goalie stats	Andy Moog 22 saves / 23 shots

May 12	New York Islanders	6–3	Edmonton Oilers	Northlands Coliseum	Recap
Tomas Jonsson (2) – 14:21; Bobby Nystrom (7) – 17:55; Mike Bossy (16) – 19:17		First period	08:39 – Dave Semenko (1)
Bob Bourne (7) – 08:03; Brent Sutter (8) – 08:41		Second period	05:07 – Jari Kurri (6)
Brent Sutter (9) – 14:11		Third period	04:48 – Glenn Anderson (10)
Billy Smith 30 saves / 33 shots		Goalie stats	Andy Moog 19 saves / 25 shots

May 14	Edmonton Oilers	1–5	New York Islanders	Nassau Coliseum	Recap
No scoring		First period	19:41 – Anders Kallur (3)
Jari Kurri (7) – pp – 01:05		Second period	No scoring
No scoring		Third period	05:11 – Bob Bourne (8); 06:21 – Ken Morrow (4); 16:43 – Duane Sutter (9); 19:02 – pp – Brent Sutter (10)
Andy Moog 23 saves / 28 shots		Goalie stats	Billy Smith 33 saves / 34 shots

May 17	Edmonton Oilers	2–4	New York Islanders	Nassau Coliseum	Recap
No scoring		First period	11:02 – pp – Bryan Trottier (8); 11:45 – John Tonelli (7); 12:39 – Mike Bossy (17)
Jari Kurri (8) – 00:35; Mark Messier (15) – 19:39		Second period	No scoring
No scoring		Third period	18:51 – en – Ken Morrow (5)
Andy Moog 22 saves / 25 shots		Goalie stats	Billy Smith 24 saves / 26 shots

New York won series 4–0

== Player statistics ==
=== Skaters ===
These are the top ten skaters based on points.

Player	Team	GP	G	A	Pts	+/–	PIM
Wayne Gretzky	Edmonton Oilers	16	12	26	38	+20	4
Rick Middleton	Boston Bruins	17	11	22	33	+13	6
Barry Pederson	Boston Bruins	17	14	18	32	+10	21
Bob Bourne	New York Islanders	20	8	20	28	+19	14
Mike Bossy	New York Islanders	19	17	9	26	+7	10
Jari Kurri	Edmonton Oilers	16	8	15	23	+16	8
Ray Bourque	Boston Bruins	17	8	15	23	+15	10
Mark Messier	Edmonton Oilers	15	15	6	21	+11	14
Brent Sutter	New York Islanders	20	10	11	21	+18	26
Duane Sutter	New York Islanders	20	9	12	21	+16	43

=== Goaltenders ===
This is a combined table of the top five goaltenders based on goals against average and the top five goaltenders based on save percentage, with at least 420 minutes played. The table is sorted by GAA, and the criteria for inclusion are bolded.

Player	Team	GP	W	L	SA	GA	GAA	SV%	SO	TOI
Billy Smith	New York Islanders	17	13	3	494	43	**2.69**	**.913**	2	960:02
Andy Moog	Edmonton Oilers	16	11	5	461	48	**3.04**	**.896**	0	946:16
Bob Sauve	Buffalo Sabres	10	6	4	234	28	**3.08**	**.880**	2	545:06
Pete Peeters	Boston Bruins	17	9	8	481	61	**3.58**	**.873**	1	1022:10
Murray Bannerman	Chicago Black Hawks	8	4	4	238	32	**4.01**	.866	0	479:04

== See also ==
- 1982–83 NHL season
- List of NHL seasons
- List of Stanley Cup champions

Preceded by 1982 Stanley Cup playoffs	Stanley Cup playoffs	Succeeded by 1984 Stanley Cup playoffs
