= List of Vegas Golden Knights general managers =

National Hockey League team's managers

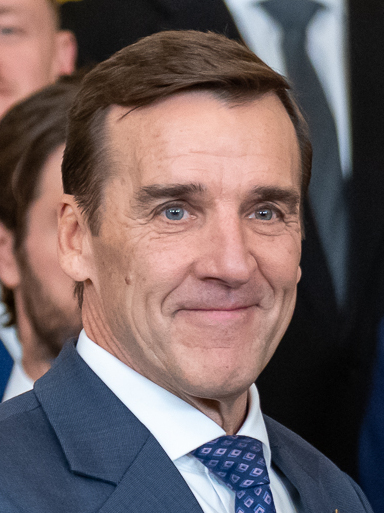
George McPhee served as the Golden Knights' first general manager from 2016 to 2019, and continues to serve as president of hockey operations.

The Vegas Golden Knights are a professional ice hockey expansion team based in Las Vegas, Nevada. The team began play in the 2017–18 NHL season, a member of the Pacific Division of the Western Conference of the National Hockey League (NHL). The team is owned by Black Knight Sports & Entertainment, a consortium led by Bill Foley, and plays its home games at T-Mobile Arena on the Las Vegas Strip in Paradise, Nevada.

There have been two general managers in franchise history. George McPhee, who had most recently served as an advisor to New York Islanders general manager Garth Snow, was named the first general manager in franchise history on July 13, 2016. McPhee led the franchise through its expansion draft in 2017, followed by a historic inaugural season that resulted in a Pacific Division championship and an appearance in the 2018 Stanley Cup Final; he subsequently received the NHL General Manager of the Year Award after the season. During the 2018–19 season, McPhee additionally acquired future captain Mark Stone from the Ottawa Senators via trade. Following McPhee's second season as general manager, the franchise promoted assistant general manager Kelly McCrimmon to general manager amidst rumors of interest from the Edmonton Oilers, with McPhee retaining his role as president of hockey operations.

In the following five seasons under McCrimmon, the Golden Knights reached the playoffs a further four times, including two Pacific Division titles, but also missed the playoffs for the first time in 2021–22. McCrimmon became known for aggressive trades during his tenure; while general manager, Vegas traded away three of their four first-round prospects drafted between 2019 and 2023, as well as the franchise's first-round picks in 2022, 2025, and 2026, in order to acquire players such as Jack Eichel, Ivan Barbashev, Noah Hanifin, and Tomas Hertl. McCrimmon's actions sometimes caused controversy, including trading away Vezina Trophy winner Marc-Andre Fleury in order to create salary cap space for other contracts, as well as a voided trade, with an attempt to send Evgenii Dadonov to the Anaheim Ducks falling through due to non-compliance with Dadonov's no-trade clause. Ultimately, McCrimmon led the Golden Knights to their second Stanley Cup Final appearance in 2023, resulting in their first Stanley Cup victory, and becoming the fastest expansion team in NHL history to win the Cup.

== General managers ==
General managers of the Vegas Golden Knights
No.	Name	Tenure	Accomplishments	Ref(s)
1	George McPhee	July 13, 2016 – September 1, 2019	1 Stanley Cup Final appearance (2018); General Manager of the Year (2017–18); 1 conference title, 1 division title, and 2 playoff appearances	
2	Kelly McCrimmon	September 1, 2019 – present	1 Stanley Cup championship (2023); 2 Stanley Cup Final appearances (2023, 2026); 2 conference titles, 3 division titles, and 5 playoff appearances	

== See also ==
- List of NHL general managers
