= List of New York Islanders award winners =

New York Islanders awards
- Four banners representing the New York Islanders Stanley Cup championships hanging in the rafters of the Nassau Veterans Memorial Coliseum.

Team trophies
- Award*: Wins
- Stanley Cup: 4
- Clarence S. Campbell Bowl: 3
- Prince of Wales Trophy: 3

Individual awards
- Award*: Wins
- Art Ross Trophy: 1
- Bill Masterton Memorial Trophy: 3
- Calder Memorial Trophy: 6
- Charlie Conacher Memorial Trophy: 1
- Conn Smythe Trophy: 4
- Frank J. Selke Trophy: 1
- General Manager of the Year Award: 2
- Hart Memorial Trophy: 1
- Jack Adams Award: 2
- James Norris Memorial Trophy: 3
- King Clancy Memorial Trophy: 3
- Lady Byng Memorial Trophy: 4
- Lester Patrick Trophy: 4
- NHL Foundation Player Award: 1
- NHL Man of the Year Award: 1
- Vezina Trophy: 1
- William M. Jennings Trophy: 2

Total
- Awards won: 50

The New York Islanders are a professional ice hockey team based in Elmont, New York. They compete in the National Hockey League (NHL) as a member of the Metropolitan Division in the Eastern Conference. The team plays its home games at UBS Arena.

The franchise, and its members, have won numerous team and individual awards and honors. The team won the Clarence S. Campbell Bowl trophy for having the best regular-season record in the Campbell Conference in 1978, 1979 and 1981. Following league realignment in 1981, they then captured the Prince of Wales Trophy as the Wales Conference playoff champion consecutively from 1982 to 1984. The Islanders won the Stanley Cup four consecutive years from 1980 to 1983. Denis Potvin, Bryan Trottier and Mike Bossy have won at least four awards, with all three winning the Calder Memorial Trophy as rookie of the year in their first NHL seasons. They also won other various awards, such as the Art Ross, James Norris Memorial and Lady Byng Memorial trophies. All three players earned selections to the First and Second All-Star teams numerous times.

Eight players have had their numbers retired by the Islanders: 5 (Denis Potvin), 9 (Clark Gillies), 19 (Bryan Trottier), 22 (Mike Bossy), 23 (Bob Nystrom), 27 (John Tonelli), 31 (Billy Smith) and 91 (Butch Goring). Of them, five players have been elected to the Hockey Hall of Fame: Denis Potvin, Bryan Trottier, Mike Bossy, Billy Smith and Clark Gillies. Other management personnel who have been inducted include Al Arbour, who coached the Islanders from 1972 to 1986, 1988 to 1994 and for one game in 2007 and Bill Torrey, who held the general manager position from 1972 to 1992.

== League awards ==
=== Team trophies ===
The New York Islanders have won the Prince of Wales Trophy and Clarence S. Campbell Bowl three times each and the Stanley Cup four consecutive times, from 1980 to 1983. The Islanders have never won the Presidents' Trophy which has been given to the team finishing the regular season with the best overall record based on points since the 1985–86 season. Prior to the creation of the trophy the Islanders led the league in points three times for the 1978–79, 1980–81, and 1981–82 seasons.

Team trophies awarded to the New York Islanders
Award	Description	Times won	Seasons	References
Stanley Cup	NHL championship	4	1979–80, 1980–81, 1981–82, 1982–83	
Clarence S. Campbell Bowl	Campbell Conference regular season championship (1974–81)	3	1977–78, 1978–79, 1980–81	
Prince of Wales Trophy	Wales/Eastern Conference playoff championship (1981–present)	3	1981–82, 1982–83, 1983–84	

=== Individual awards ===
Bryan Trottier, Denis Potvin and Mike Bossy have won four or five individual awards each. In 1978–79, Trottier led the NHL with 47 goals and 134 points, earning him the Art Ross Trophy and a spot on the NHL first All-Star team. Trottier also received the Hart Memorial Trophy for being the most valuable player during the 1978–79 regular season. In the 1975–76, 1977–78, and 1978–79 regular seasons, Potvin was awarded the James Norris Memorial Trophy as the best defense player in the league. Bossy is a three-time winner of the Lady Byng Memorial Trophy, an award given for gentlemanly conduct during the regular season. All three have won the Calder Memorial Trophy once, and have been on the NHL first All-Star team at least twice. Trottier and Bossy have both won the Conn Smythe Trophy once, which is awarded to the most valuable player of the playoffs.

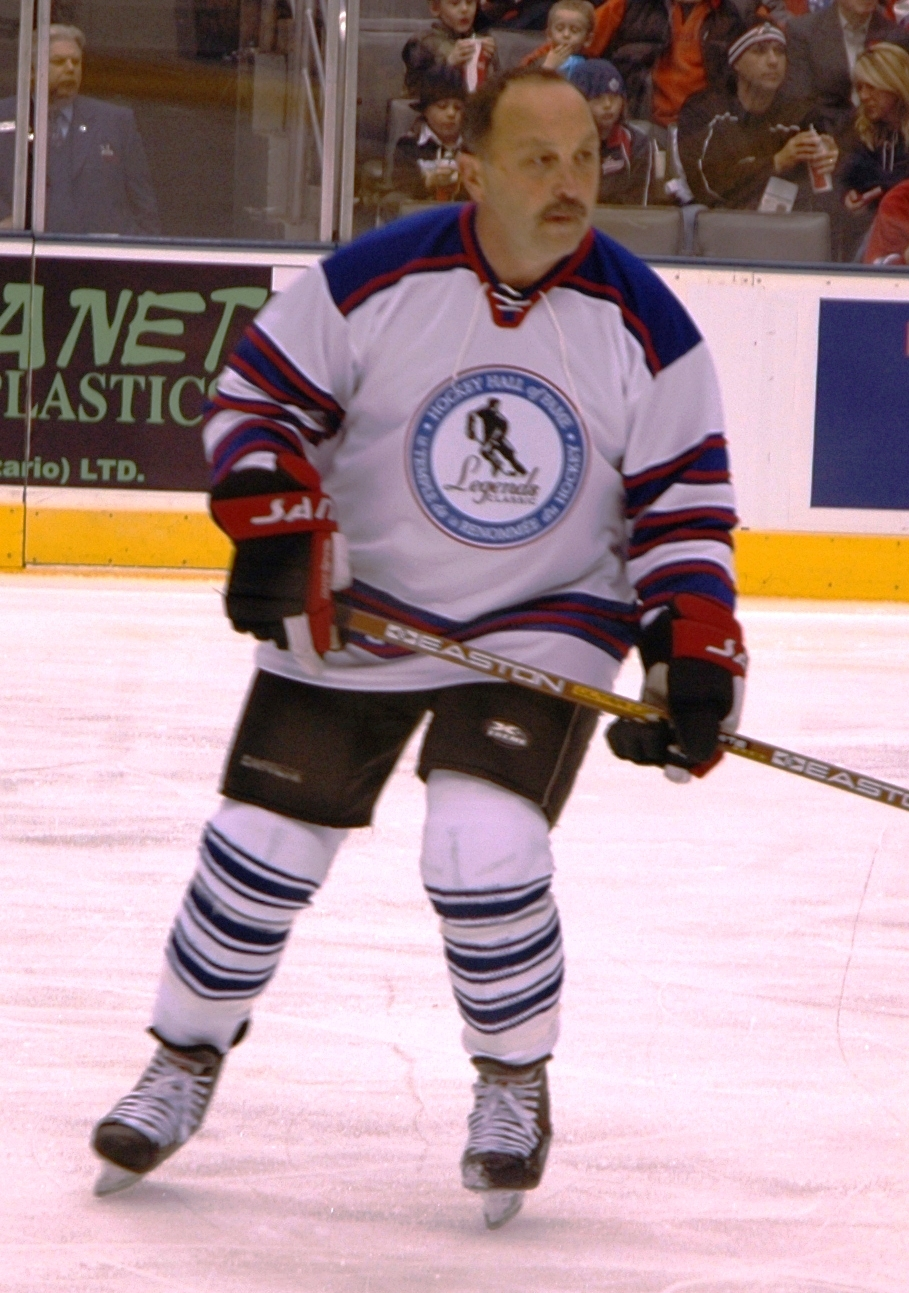
Bryan Trottier won numerous awards as an Islander.

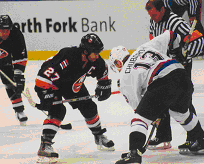
Michael Peca won the Frank J. Selke Trophy as NHL's top defensive forward in 2001–02.

Individual awards won by New York Islanders players and staff
Award	Description	Winner	Season	References
Art Ross Trophy	Regular season scoring champion	Bryan Trottier	1978–79	
Bill Masterton Memorial Trophy	Perseverance, sportsmanship, and dedication to hockey	Ed Westfall	1976–77	
Bill Masterton Memorial Trophy	Perseverance, sportsmanship, and dedication to hockey	Mark Fitzpatrick	1991–92	
Bill Masterton Memorial Trophy	Perseverance, sportsmanship, and dedication to hockey	Robin Lehner	2018–19	
Calder Memorial Trophy	Rookie of the year	Denis Potvin	1973–74	
Calder Memorial Trophy	Rookie of the year	Bryan Trottier	1975–76	
Calder Memorial Trophy	Rookie of the year	Mike Bossy	1977–78	
Calder Memorial Trophy	Rookie of the year	Bryan Berard	1996–97	
Calder Memorial Trophy	Rookie of the year	Mathew Barzal	2017–18	
Calder Memorial Trophy	Rookie of the year	Matthew Schaefer	2025–26	
Charlie Conacher Humanitarian Award	Outstanding contribution to humanitarian or community service projects	Ed Westfall	1973–74	
Conn Smythe Trophy	Most valuable player of the playoffs	Bryan Trottier	1979–80	
Conn Smythe Trophy	Most valuable player of the playoffs	Butch Goring	1980–81	
Conn Smythe Trophy	Most valuable player of the playoffs	Mike Bossy	1981–82	
Conn Smythe Trophy	Most valuable player of the playoffs	Billy Smith	1982–83	
Frank J. Selke Trophy	Forward who best excels in the defensive aspect of the game	Michael Peca	2001–02	
General manager of the Year Award	Top general manager	Lou Lamoriello	2019–20	
General manager of the Year Award	Top general manager	Lou Lamoriello	2020–21	
Hart Memorial Trophy	Most Valuable Player during the regular season	Bryan Trottier	1978–79	
Jack Adams Award	Top coach during the regular season	Al Arbour	1978–79	
Jack Adams Award	Top coach during the regular season	Barry Trotz	2018–19	
James Norris Memorial Trophy	Top defenseman during the regular season	Denis Potvin	1975–76	
James Norris Memorial Trophy	Top defenseman during the regular season	Denis Potvin	1977–78	
James Norris Memorial Trophy	Top defenseman during the regular season	Denis Potvin	1978–79	
King Clancy Memorial Trophy	Leadership qualities on and off the ice and humanitarian contributions within their community	Bryan Trottier	1988–89	
King Clancy Memorial Trophy	Leadership qualities on and off the ice and humanitarian contributions within their community	Doug Weight	2010–11	
King Clancy Memorial Trophy	Leadership qualities on and off the ice and humanitarian contributions within their community	Anders Lee	2023–24	
Lady Byng Memorial Trophy	Gentlemanly conduct	Mike Bossy	1982–83	
Lady Byng Memorial Trophy	Gentlemanly conduct	Mike Bossy	1983–84	
Lady Byng Memorial Trophy	Gentlemanly conduct	Mike Bossy	1985–86	
Lady Byng Memorial Trophy	Gentlemanly conduct	Pierre Turgeon	1992–93	
NHL Man of the Year Award	Sportsmanship and involvement with charitable groups	Bryan Trottier	1987–88	
Vezina Trophy	Top goaltender	Billy Smith	1981–82	
William M. Jennings Trophy	Fewest goals given up in the regular season	Roland Melanson	1982–83	
William M. Jennings Trophy	Fewest goals given up in the regular season	Billy Smith	1982–83	
William M. Jennings Trophy	Fewest goals given up in the regular season	Thomas Greiss	2018–19	
William M. Jennings Trophy	Fewest goals given up in the regular season	Robin Lehner	2018–19	
NHL Foundation Player Award	Community service	Travis Hamonic	2016–17	

== All-Stars ==
=== NHL first and second team All-Stars ===
The NHL first and second team All-Stars are the top players at each position as voted on by the Professional Hockey Writers' Association.

New York Islanders selected to the NHL First and Second Team All-Stars
Player	Position	Selections	Season	Team
Mike Bossy	Right wing	8	1977–78	2nd
Mike Bossy	Right wing	8	1978–79	2nd
Mike Bossy	Right wing	8	1980–81	1st
Mike Bossy	Right wing	8	1981–82	1st
Mike Bossy	Right wing	8	1982–83	1st
Mike Bossy	Right wing	8	1983–84	1st
Mike Bossy	Right wing	8	1984–85	2nd
Mike Bossy	Right wing	8	1985–86	1st
Clark Gillies	Left wing	2	1977–78	1st
Clark Gillies	Left wing	2	1978–79	1st
Roland Melanson	Goaltender	1	1982–83	2nd
Denis Potvin	Defense	7	1974–75	1st
Denis Potvin	Defense	7	1975–76	1st
Denis Potvin	Defense	7	1976–77	2nd
Denis Potvin	Defense	7	1977–78	1st
Denis Potvin	Defense	7	1978–79	1st
Denis Potvin	Defense	7	1980–81	1st
Denis Potvin	Defense	7	1983–84	1st
Glenn Resch	Goaltender	2	1975–76	2nd
Glenn Resch	Goaltender	2	1978–79	2nd
Ilya Sorokin	Goaltender	1	2022–23	2nd
John Tavares	Center	1	2014–15	1st
John Tonelli	Left wing	2	1981–82	2nd
John Tonelli	Left wing	2	1984–85	2nd
Bryan Trottier	Center	4	1977–78	1st
Bryan Trottier	Center	4	1978–79	1st
Bryan Trottier	Center	4	1981–82	2nd
Bryan Trottier	Center	4	1983–84	2nd

=== NHL All-Rookie Team ===
The NHL All-Rookie Team consists of the top rookies at each position as voted on by the Professional Hockey Writers' Association.

New York Islanders selected to the NHL All-Rookie Team
Player	Position	Season
Mathew Barzal	Forward	2017–18
Bryan Berard	Defense	1996–97
Michael Grabner	Forward	2010–11
Trent Hunter	Forward	2003–04
Vladimir Malakhov	Defense	1992–93
Matthew Schaefer	Defense	2025–26
John Tavares	Forward	2009–10
David Volek	Forward	1988–89

=== All-Star Game selections ===
The National Hockey League All-Star Game is a mid-season exhibition game held annually between many of the top players of each season. Thirty-nine All-Star Games have been held since the Islanders entered the league in 1972, with at least one player chosen to represent the Islanders in each year except 2001 and 2011. The All-Star game has not been held in various years: 1979 and 1987 due to the 1979 Challenge Cup and Rendez-vous '87 series between the NHL and the Soviet national team, respectively, 1995, 2005, and 2013 as a result of labor stoppages, 2006, 2010, 2014 and 2026 due to the Winter Olympic Games, 2021 as a result of the COVID-19 pandemic, and 2025 when it was replaced by the 2025 4 Nations Face-Off. Denis Potvin played a franchise-high nine All-Star Games as a member of the Islanders. The Islanders have hosted one of the games. The 35th took place at Nassau Veterans Memorial Coliseum.

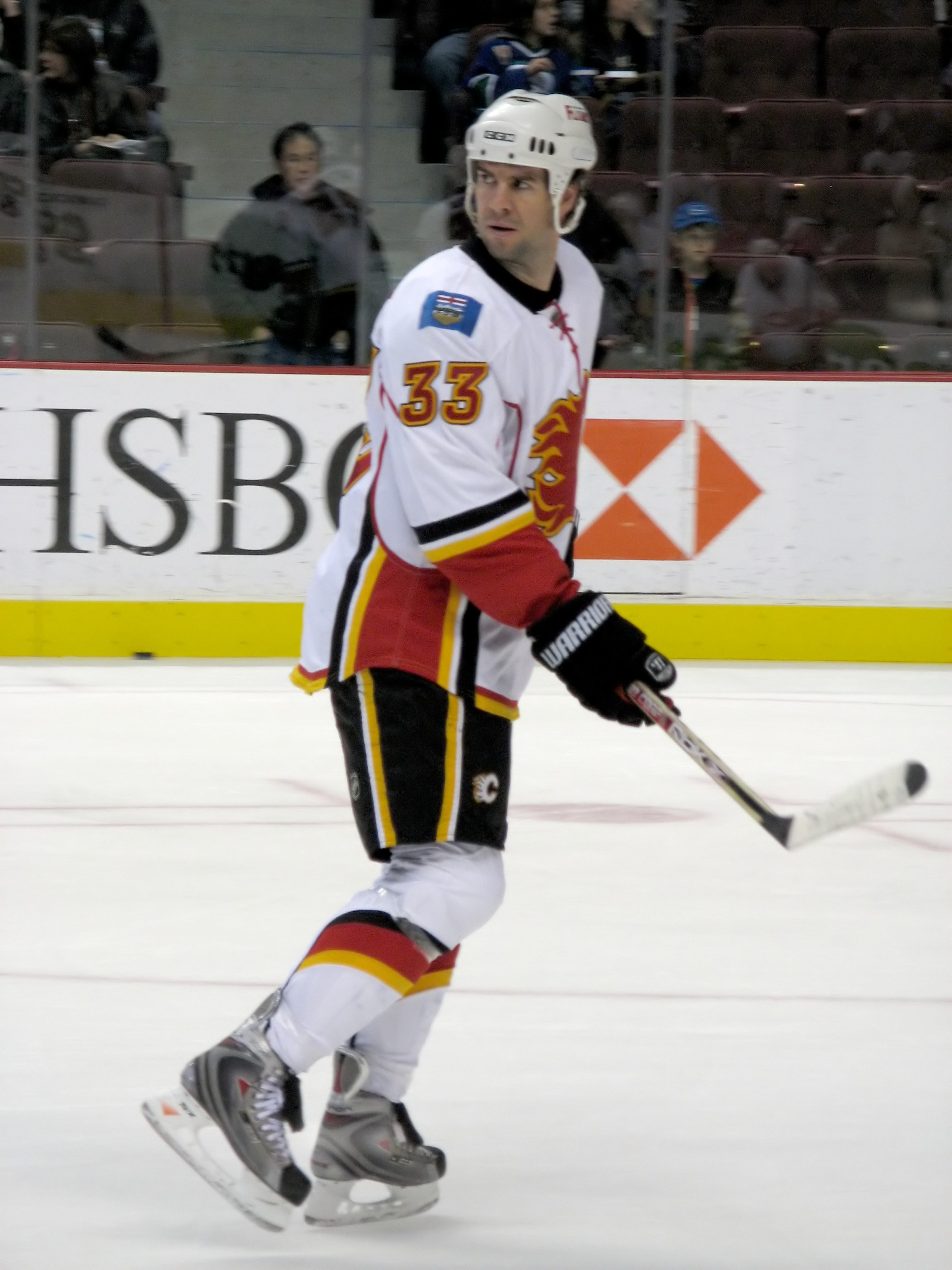
Adrian Aucoin played in the 2004 game.

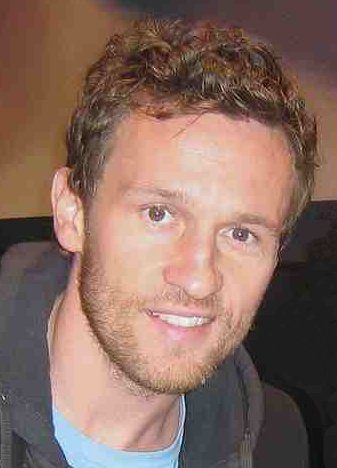
Mariusz Czerkawski played in the 2000 game.

- † Selected by fan vote
- ↑ All-Star Game Most Valuable Player

New York Islanders players and coaches selected to the All-Star Game
Game	Year	Name	Position	References
26th	1973	Ed Westfall	Right wing	
27th	1974	Denis Potvin	Defense	
27th	1974	Ed Westfall	Right wing	
28th	1975	Denis Potvin	Defense	
28th	1975	Ed Westfall	Right wing	
29th	1976	Billy Harris	Right wing	
29th	1976	Denis Potvin	Defense	
29th	1976	Glenn Resch	Goaltender	
29th	1976	Bryan Trottier	Center	
30th	1977	Bob Nystrom	Right wing	
30th	1977	Denis Potvin	Defense	
30th	1977	Glenn Resch	Goaltender	
31st	1978	Mike Bossy	Right wing	
31st	1978	Clark Gillies	Left wing	
31st	1978	Denis Potvin	Defense	
31st	1978	Billy Smith↑	Goaltender	
31st	1978	Bryan Trottier	Center	
32nd	1980	Al Arbour	Coach	
32nd	1980	Mike Bossy	Right wing	
32nd	1980	Bryan Trottier	Center	
33rd	1981	Mike Bossy	Right wing	
33rd	1981	Bob Bourne	Center	
33rd	1981	Denis Potvin	Defense	
34th	1982	Al Arbour	Coach	
34th	1982	Mike Bossy↑	Right wing	
34th	1982	John Tonelli	Left wing	
34th	1982	Bryan Trottier	Center	
35th	1983	Al Arbour	Coach	
35th	1983	Mike Bossy	Right wing	
35th	1983	Dave Langevin	Defense	
35th	1983	Denis Potvin	Defense	
35th	1983	Bryan Trottier	Center	
36th	1984	Al Arbour	Coach	
36th	1984	Denis Potvin	Defense	
37th	1985	Al Arbour	Coach	
37th	1985	Mike Bossy	Right wing	
37th	1985	Brent Sutter	Center	
37th	1985	John Tonelli	Left wing	
37th	1985	Bryan Trottier	Center	
38th	1986	Mike Bossy	Right wing	
38th	1986	Bryan Trottier	Center	
39th	1988	Pat LaFontaine	Center	
39th	1988	Denis Potvin	Defense	
40th	1989	Pat LaFontaine	Center	
41st	1990	Pat LaFontaine	Center	
42nd	1991	Pat LaFontaine	Center	
43rd	1992	Ray Ferraro	Left wing	
44th	1993	Pierre Turgeon	Center	
45th	1994	Pierre Turgeon	Center	
46th	1996	Mathieu Schneider	Defense	
47th	1997	Scott Lachance	Defense	
48th	1998	Zigmund Palffy	Right wing	
49th	1999	Kenny Jonsson (Did not play)	Defense	
50th	2000	Mariusz Czerkawski	Right wing	
51st	2001	No Islanders selected	—	
52nd	2002	Mark Parrish	Right wing	
52nd	2002	Alexei Yashin	Center	
53rd	2003	Roman Hamrlik	Defense	
54th	2004	Adrian Aucoin	Defense	
55th	2007	Jason Blake	Left wing	
56th	2008	Rick DiPietro	Goaltender	
57th	2009	Mark Streit	Defense	
58th	2011	No Islanders selected	—	
59th	2012	John Tavares	Center	
60th	2015	Jaroslav Halak	Goaltender	
60th	2015	John Tavares	Center	
61st	2016	John Tavares	Center	
62nd	2017	John Tavares	Center	
63rd	2018	Josh Bailey	Right wing	
63rd	2018	John Tavares	Center	
64th	2019	Mathew Barzal	Center	
65th	2020	Mathew Barzal	Center	
66th	2022	Adam Pelech	Defense	
67th	2023	Bo Horvat (Note: Horvat was voted in as a member of the Vancouver Canucks. A trade on January 30 saw Horvat moved to the New York Islanders. Horvat still played for the Pacific Division all-stars but as a representative of the Islanders.)†	Center	
67th	2023	Brock Nelson	Center	
67th	2023	Ilya Sorokin†	Goaltender	
68th	2024	Mathew Barzal	Center	

=== All-Star Game replacement events ===
- † Selected by fan vote

New York Islanders players and coaches selected to All-Star Game replacement events
Event	Year	Name	Position	References
Challenge Cup	1979	Mike Bossy	Right wing	
Challenge Cup	1979	Clark Gillies	Left wing	
Challenge Cup	1979	Denis Potvin	Defense	
Challenge Cup	1979	Bryan Trottier	Center	
Rendez-vous '87	1987	Mike Bossy† (Did not play)	Right wing	
4 Nations Face-Off	2025	Brock Nelson (United States)	Center	

== Career achievements ==
=== Hockey Hall of Fame ===
Several members of the Islanders organization have been honored by the Hockey Hall of Fame. Denis Potvin and Mike Bossy were the first Islander players inducted, gaining election in 1991. Potvin recorded 310 goals in 1060 games for the Islanders, and Bossy recorded 573 goals in 752 games. They were joined in 1993 by a fellow member of the 1980–83 Stanley Cup championship teams, Billy Smith. Smith spent 17 seasons with the Islanders, recording 304 wins and capturing the Vezina Trophy and the William M. Jennings Trophy once each. Bryan Trottier, elected in 1997, became the fourth former Islanders player to enter the Hall of Fame. Trottier played 15 seasons on Long Island and recorded 500 goals in 1123 games. In 2002, Clark Gillies became the fifth former Islander inducted into the Hall; Gillies was a member of the Islanders from 1974 to 1986.

Two members of team management have been inducted in the "Builders" category. Former head coach Al Arbour gained election as a builder in 1996, having coached the Islanders to four Stanley Cup victories. Arbour coached 20 seasons with the Islanders from 1973 to 1986, and 1988–94, and his 740 wins in 1500 games are a team record. Bill Torrey was the Islanders' general manager from the organization's first year in 1972 to 1992. During that period, the Islanders qualified for the playoffs 14 consecutive times between 1975 and 1988, including an additional time in 1990. Torrey was inducted in 1995.

New York Islanders inducted into the Hockey Hall of Fame
Individual	Category	Year inducted	Years with Islanders in category	References
Al Arbour	Builder	1996	1973–1986, 1988–1994, 2007	
Mike Bossy	Player	1991	1977–1987	
Zdeno Chára	Player	2025	1997–2001, 2021–2022	
Jim Devellano	Builder	2010	1972–1982	
Clark Gillies	Player	2002	1974–1986	
Pat LaFontaine	Player	2003	1984–1991	
Lou Lamoriello	Builder	2009	2018–2025	
Roberto Luongo	Player	2022	1999–2000	
Denis Potvin	Player	1991	1973–1988	
Billy Smith	Player	1993	1972–1989	
Bill Torrey	Builder	1995	1972–1992	
Bryan Trottier	Player	1997	1975–1990	
Pierre Turgeon	Player	2023	1991–1995	

=== Foster Hewitt Memorial Award ===
One member of the Islanders organization has been honored with the Foster Hewitt Memorial Award. The award is presented by the Hockey Hall of Fame to members of the radio and television industry who make outstanding contributions to their profession and the game of ice hockey during their broadcasting career.

Members of the New York Islanders honored with the Foster Hewitt Memorial Award
Individual	Year honored	Years with Islanders as broadcaster
Jiggs McDonald	1990	1980–1995, 2006–2016

=== Lester Patrick Trophy ===
Five members of the Islanders organization have been honored with the Lester Patrick Trophy. The trophy has been presented by the National Hockey League and USA Hockey since 1966 to honor a recipient's contribution to ice hockey in the United States. This list includes all personnel who have ever been employed by the New York Islanders in any capacity and have also received the Lester Patrick Trophy.

Members of the New York Islanders honored with the Lester Patrick Trophy
Individual	Year honored	Years with Islanders	References
Al Arbour	1992	1973–1986, 1988–1994, 2007	
Pat LaFontaine	1997	1984–1991	
Lou Lamoriello	1992	2018–2025	
Ken Morrow	1996	1980–1989	
Bill Torrey	1983	1972–1992	

=== United States Hockey Hall of Fame ===
Members of the New York Islanders inducted into the United States Hockey Hall of Fame
Individual	Year inducted	Years with Islanders	References
Bill Guerin	2013	2007–2009	
Craig Janney	2016	1999	
Pat LaFontaine	2003	1984–1992	
Lou Lamoriello	2003	2018–2025	
Ken Morrow	1995	1980–1989	
Mathieu Schneider	2015	1995–1996	
Doug Weight	2013	2008–2011	

=== Retired numbers ===
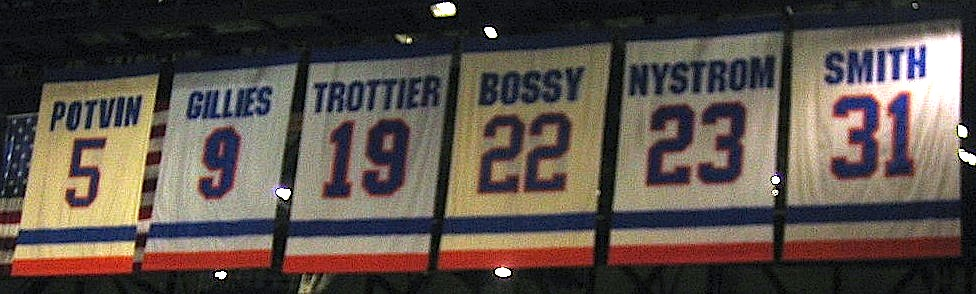
The Islanders' retired numbers raised at Nassau Coliseum

The New York Islanders have retired eight numbers, which means that no player can use those jersey numbers again while part of the team. Of the eight players whose numbers were retired, five have been inducted into the Hockey Hall of Fame. In addition to the numbers, two additional banners are raised at Nassau Veterans Memorial Coliseum. One of these is for Al Arbour, who was the Islanders head coach for 20 seasons. The number on Arbour's banner is 1500, which represents the number of games Arbour has coached. Another banner is for Bill Torrey, who was the general manager of the Islanders from 1972 to 1992. In place of a number, his banner features a bow tie (his unofficial trademark) and the words "The Architect". Also out of circulation is the number 99 which was retired league-wide for Wayne Gretzky on February 6, 2000. Gretzky did not play for the Islanders during his 20-year NHL career and no Islanders player had ever worn the number 99 prior to its retirement.

New York Islanders retired numbers
Number	Player	Position	Years with Islanders as a player	Date of retirement ceremony
5	Denis Potvin	Defense	1973–1988	February 1, 1992
9	Clark Gillies	Left wing	1974–1986	December 7, 1996
19	Bryan Trottier	Center	1975–1990	October 20, 2001
22	Mike Bossy	Right wing	1977–1987	March 3, 1992
23	Bob Nystrom	Right wing	1972–1986	April 1, 1995
27	John Tonelli	Left wing	1978–1986	February 21, 2020
31	Billy Smith	Goaltender	1972–1989	February 20, 1993
91	Butch Goring	Center	1980–1984	February 29, 2020

=== New York Islanders Hall of Fame ===
The New York Islanders Hall of Fame was established in 2006. Individuals who had their number retired or had a banner hanging from the rafters prior to 2006 gained automatic induction.

Inducted into the New York Islanders Hall of Fame
Individual	Primary role	Years with Islanders in role	Date of induction ceremony	References
Al Arbour	Head coach	1973–1986, 1988–1994, 2007	January 25, 1997	
Mike Bossy	Player	1977–1987	March 3, 1992	
Bob Bourne	Player	1974–1986	November 25, 2006	
Patrick Flatley	Player	1984–1996	January 14, 2012	
Clark Gillies	Player	1974–1986	December 7, 1996	
Butch Goring	Player	1980–1984	February 29, 2020	
Kenny Jonsson	Player	1996–2004	February 11, 2012	
Pat LaFontaine	Player	1983-91	December 13, 2025	
Ken Morrow	Player	1980–1989	December 31, 2011	
Bob Nystrom	Player	1972–1986	April 1, 1995	
Denis Potvin	Player	1973–1988	February 1, 1992	
Billy Smith	Player	1972–1989	February 20, 1993	
Brent Sutter	Player	1981–1991	January 18, 2025	
John Tonelli	Player	1978–1986	February 21, 2020	
Bill Torrey	Executive	1972–1992	January 13, 2001	
Bryan Trottier	Player	1975–1990	October 20, 2001	
Ed Westfall	Player	1972–1979	November 19, 2011	

== Team awards ==
=== Bob Nystrom Award ===
The Bob Nystrom Award is an Islanders team award given each year to the player who "best exemplifies leadership, hustle and dedication." It was first awarded in 1991, and is named after Islanders' Hall of Famer, Bob Nystrom.

- 1990–91 – Brent Sutter
- 1991–92 – Ray Ferraro
- 1992–93 – Benoit Hogue
- 1993–94 – Steve Thomas
- 1995–96 – Dan Plante
- 1996–97 – Claude Lapointe
- 1997–98 – Rich Pilon
- 1998–99 – Claude Lapointe
- 1999–00 – Claude Lapointe
- 2000–01 – Dave Scatchard
- 2001–02 – Steve Webb
- 2002–03 – Jason Blake and Garth Snow
- 2003–04 – Adrian Aucoin
- 2005–06 – Kevin Colley
- 2006–07 – Trent Hunter
- 2007–08 – Richard Park
- 2008–09 – Tim Jackman
- 2009–10 – Kyle Okposo
- 2010–11 – Frans Nielsen
- 2011–12 – Matt Martin
- 2012–13 – Matt Martin
- 2013–14 – Matt Martin
- 2014–15 – Matt Martin
- 2015–16 – Matt Martin
- 2016–17 – Anders Lee
- 2017–18 – Casey Cizikas
- 2018–19 – Casey Cizikas
- 2019–20 – Matt Martin
- 2020–21 – Jean-Gabriel Pageau
- 2021–22 – Zach Parise
- 2022–23 – Zach Parise
- 2023–24 – Cal Clutterbuck
- 2024–25 – Matt Martin
- 2025–26 – Bo Horvat
