= George McPhee =

Canadian ice hockey executive (born 1958)

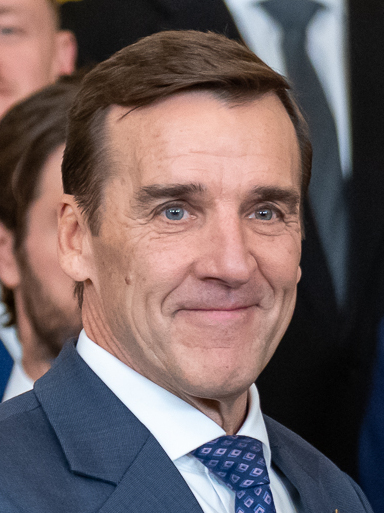
- McPhee at the White House in 2023
- Born: July 2, 1958 (age 68) Guelph, Ontario, Canada
- Height: 5 ft 10 in (178 cm)
- Weight: 170 lb (77 kg; 12 st 2 lb)
- Position: Forward
- Shot: Right
- Played for: New York Rangers; New Jersey Devils
- NHL draft: Undrafted
- Playing career: 1982–1989

George McPhee (born July 2, 1958) is a Canadian ice hockey executive and former player who is the president of hockey operations for the Vegas Golden Knights of the National Hockey League (NHL). McPhee served as the general manager of the Washington Capitals and has also served as alternate governor, vice president and special assistant to the general manager of the New York Islanders. As a player, McPhee won the Hobey Baker Award in 1982 as the best college ice hockey player, later playing for the New York Rangers and New Jersey Devils.

== Early life ==
Though born and raised in Guelph, Ontario, McPhee spent most of the first two years of his life in Glace Bay, Nova Scotia, where his father and grandparents were from.

== Playing career ==
Prior to his career in management, McPhee played college ice hockey at Bowling Green State University. He was the recipient of the Hobey Baker Award in 1982, was chosen as a First-Team All-Central Collegiate Hockey Association (CCHA) selection in 1982, Second-Team All-CCHA honors in 1979 and 1981, and was the CCHA Rookie of the Year in 1979. After leaving Bowling Green, he won the 1983–84 Adams Cup championship as a member of the Tulsa Oilers of the Central Hockey League (CHL), which coached by Tom Webster.

McPhee began his National Hockey League (NHL) career in the 1983 Stanley Cup playoffs for the New York Rangers. In those playoffs, he and Ray Cote of the Edmonton Oilers became the first players to score three goals in a single Stanley Cup playoffs prior to playing a regular season NHL game. McPhee ultimately had a seven-year career in the NHL, playing for the Rangers and New Jersey Devils.

== Management career ==
=== Vancouver Canucks ===
In 1992, McPhee assumed his first major NHL management position, starting as vice president and director of hockey operations (as well as alternate governor) for the Vancouver Canucks, assisting then-general manager Pat Quinn. With McPhee, the team made the playoffs four times, won a division championship, and played in the 1994 Stanley Cup Final, which they lost to the New York Rangers.

=== Washington Capitals ===
When McPhee joined the Washington Capitals in 1997, the team was looking to turn around its long storied history of being a top regular season performer that disappointed in the playoffs. His tenure began well as he engineered the club's first trip to the Stanley Cup Final appearance in his first season, which the Capitals lost to the Detroit Red Wings. The team played well under the general management of McPhee, winning seven Southeast Division championships (2000, 2001, 2008, 2009, 2010, 2011 and 2013), eight 40-or-more win seasons (1998, 2000, 2001, 2008, 2009, 2010, 2011, and 2012) and a franchise-record 121-point season (2010).

On September 25, 1999, McPhee, angry at what he perceived to be dirty play by the Chicago Blackhawks, punched then Blackhawks head coach Lorne Molleken outside the Chicago locker room after their teams' exhibition game. Molleken sustained injuries to his head and in response, Blackhawks players and team aides jumped McPhee, leaving him with a torn suit. On October 1, 1999, NHL commissioner Gary Bettman suspended McPhee for one month without pay and fined him $20,000.

Throughout the 2003–04 season, McPhee and Capitals owner Ted Leonsis opted to dump salary on the Capitals' roster and focus on youth. In a "fire sale", the Capitals traded Sergei Gonchar, Jaromír Jágr, Peter Bondra, Michael Nylander, Mike Grier, Robert Lang and captain Steve Konowalchuk that season. McPhee began rebuilding the team by selecting Alexander Ovechkin with the first overall pick in the 2004 NHL entry draft; Ovechkin would live with McPhee's family as a rookie during the 2005–06 season.

The 2007–08 season would prove hopeful for McPhee, as the Capitals appeared poised to turn the corner in their development. However, after the Capitals began the season with a 6–14–1 record, McPhee fired head coach Glen Hanlon on November 22, 2007, and replaced him with Bruce Boudreau, the head coach of the Capitals' American Hockey League (AHL) affiliate, the Hershey Bears. McPhee's change worked and the 2007–08 season would end with an unprecedented comeback and an unexpected Southeast Division championship. McPhee's trade deadline acquisitions of veterans Sergei Fedorov, Matt Cooke and Cristobal Huet all played large roles in leading the Capitals to their third Southeast Division title.

In 2013, McPhee traded Swedish winger Filip Forsberg to the Nashville Predators in exchange for Martin Erat and Michael Latta. Forsberg was the Capitals' first-round pick in the 2012 NHL entry draft, selected 11th overall.

In 2014, McPhee's tenure in Washington ended when the Capitals declined to renew his contract. He was succeeded by Brian MacLellan, a childhood friend and teammate from Guelph, Ontario, and a college teammate at Bowling Green.

=== New York Islanders ===
On September 23, 2015, it was formally announced that McPhee had joined the New York Islanders in the role of an alternate governor, vice president and special advisor to general manager Garth Snow.

=== Vegas Golden Knights ===
On July 13, 2016, McPhee left the Islanders organization after he was hired by Bill Foley, owner of an NHL expansion franchise, which would later be named the Vegas Golden Knights, to be the inaugural general manager of the new team. The Golden Knights had a phenomenal inaugural season and reached the 2018 Stanley Cup Finals, losing to McPhee's former team, the Washington Capitals, in five games. McPhee was named a finalist for the NHL General Manager of the Year Award, which he would be awarded on June 20.

McPhee resigned as Golden Knights general manager on September 1, 2019, in favor of Kelly McCrimmon, but continued to serve as president of hockey operations. The Golden Knights returned to the Stanley Cup Final in 2023 and defeated the Florida Panthers, giving McPhee his first Stanley Cup ring.

== Personal life ==
McPhee interned on Wall Street in New York City for two off-seasons while playing for the Rangers in the 1980s. After retirement from his professional playing career, he studied law at Rutgers University's law school in Newark, New Jersey and clerked for a judge on the United States Court of International Trade before moving into ice hockey management career.

McPhee and his wife have three children. Their son Graham was drafted 149th overall in the 2016 NHL entry draft by the Edmonton Oilers.

== Career statistics ==
			Regular season					Playoffs
Season	Team	League	GP	G	A	Pts	PIM	GP	G	A	Pts	PIM
1977–78	Guelph Platers	OPJHL	48	53	57	110	150	—	—	—	—	—
1978–79	Bowling Green State University	CCHA	43	40	48	88	58	—	—	—	—	—
1979–80	Bowling Green State University	CCHA	34	21	24	45	51	—	—	—	—	—
1980–81	Bowling Green State University	CCHA	36	25	29	54	68	—	—	—	—	—
1981–82	Bowling Green State University	CCHA	40	28	52	80	57	—	—	—	—	—
1982–83	Tulsa Oilers	CHL	61	17	43	60	145	—	—	—	—	—
1982–83	New York Rangers	NHL	—	—	—	—	—	9	3	3	6	6
1983–84	New York Rangers	NHL	9	1	1	2	11	—	—	—	—	—
1983–84	Tulsa Oilers	CHL	49	20	28	48	133	—	—	—	—	—
1984–85	New Haven Nighthawks	AHL	3	2	2	4	13	—	—	—	—	—
1984–85	New York Rangers	NHL	49	12	15	27	139	3	1	0	1	7
1985–86	New York Rangers	NHL	30	4	4	8	63	11	0	0	0	32
1986–87	New York Rangers	NHL	21	4	4	8	34	6	1	0	1	28
1987–88	New Jersey Devils	NHL	5	3	0	3	8	—	—	—	—	—
1988–89	Utica Devils	AHL	8	3	2	5	31	3	1	0	1	26
1988–89	New Jersey Devils	NHL	1	0	1	1	2	—	—	—	—	—
NHL totals			115	24	25	49	257	29	5	3	8	73

== Awards and honours ==
Award	Year	Ref
College
Hobey Baker Award	1981–82	
All-CCHA First Team	1981–82	
All-CCHA Second Team	1978–79, 1980–81	
AHCA West All-American	1981–82	
NHL
NHL General Manager of the Year Award	2017–18	
The Hockey News Sam Pollock Award	2018	
Stanley Cup champion	2023	

Awards and achievements
Preceded by Award created	CCHA Rookie of the Year; 1978–79	Succeeded by Steve Mulholland
Preceded by Jeff Pyle	CCHA Player of the Year; 1981–82	Succeeded by Brian Hills
Preceded by Neal Broten	Winner of the Hobey Baker Award; 1981–82	Succeeded by Mark Fusco
Preceded by David Poile	General manager of the Washington Capitals; 1997–2014	Succeeded by Brian MacLellan
Preceded by Position created	General manager of the Vegas Golden Knights; 2016–2019	Succeeded by Kelly McCrimmon
