= Kelly McCrimmon =

General manager in the National Hockey League

- Born: October 13, 1960 (age 65); Plenty, Saskatchewan, Canada
- Education: University of Michigan
- Occupation: General manager of the Vegas Golden Knights
- Years active: 1990–present

Kelly McCrimmon (born October 13, 1960) is a Canadian ice hockey executive who is general manager of the Vegas Golden Knights of the National Hockey League (NHL).

== Biography ==
He was born on October 13, 1960 to farmers Byron and Faye McCrimmon in Plenty, Saskatchewan. His father was an amateur hockey player and coach for the Rosetown Red Wings senior team. His older brother, Brad, became a professional defenceman in the NHL. He graduated from the University of Michigan in 1984.

== Playing career ==
Kelly McCrimmon played for the Prince Albert Raiders of the SJHL before suiting up with the Wheat Kings in 1978 for two seasons, winning his first championship there as a player in his rookie season. After his WHL career, he played hockey for the University of Michigan Wolverines for four seasons, and was named captain his final season.

== Post-playing career ==
=== Brandon Wheat Kings ===
McCrimmon spent his first years of coaching junior hockey in the SJHL, starting with the North Battleford North Stars for two seasons, then one with the Lloydminster Lancers.

In 1988 he re-joined the Brandon Wheat Kings as an assistant coach, then later became general manager in 1989, as well as a few stints as head coach on the way replacing Doug Sauter and Kevin Maxwell respectively. In 1992, he became the minority owner of the Wheat Kings, purchasing one-third of the franchise. In 2001, he became the sole owner of the franchise after he bought the remaining shares from Bob Cornell.

In 1995–96, McCrimmon won his first championship as a WHL general manager and his second championship with the Wheat Kings.

In 2004, he took over the coaching duties for the Brandon Wheat Kings. In his third stint as head coach of Brandon Wheat Kings, he made an appearance in the finals as head coach and general manager. In 2011, he stepped down from his coaching duties handing them to former Ottawa Senators head coach Cory Clouston.

McCrimmon returned to the bench in the 2013–14 season for the Wheat Kings for the next three seasons. During the 2014–15 season, he coached the Wheat Kings to the Western Hockey League finals, losing to the Kelowna Rockets. The next season he was brought on as an assistant coach for Team Canada at the World Junior Championships in Helsinki, Finland. The Wheat Kings had a second stint at the finals that year winning the Ed Chynoweth Cup that year against the Seattle Thunderbirds in five games.

After joining the management of the Vegas Golden Knights in 2017, McCrimmon sold the Wheat Kings team in September 2020.

=== Vegas Golden Knights ===
After twenty-six seasons with the Brandon Wheat Kings, on August 2, 2016, McCrimmon was named the first-ever assistant general manager of the new NHL expansion team Vegas Golden Knights. This came after he turned down an offer from the Toronto Maple Leafs to join their front office.

In McCrimmon's first year as assistant general manager, the Vegas Golden Knights became the second expansion-year team, after the St. Louis Blues, to make the Stanley Cup Final.

On May 2, 2019, he was promoted to general manager as former general manager George McPhee took on the role of president. His son, Mick, joined the team as a professional scout in 2019.

On January 26, 2021, McCrimmon acted as head coach of the Golden Knights in a 5-4 shootout loss to the St. Louis Blues due to a COVID-19 outbreak within the Vegas Golden Knights coaching staff.

On June 13, 2023, the Golden Knights defeated the Florida Panthers 9 - 3 to win the Stanley Cup. By winning the Cup after six seasons, they become the fastest team to win the Stanley Cup from the time of expansion beating the 1973-74 Philadelphia Flyers who won the Cup in their seventh season.

== Awards and honours ==
McCrimmon was inducted into the Manitoba Hockey Hall of Fame in 2019.

Award	Year
WHL
Ed Chynoweth Cup	2016
NHL
Stanley Cup champion	2023

== Personal life ==
McCrimmon and his wife, Terri have two adult children, Chelsea, who worked for the Wheat Kings, and Mick, who works for the Knights. He is the younger brother of NHL defenseman and later coach Brad McCrimmon, who died in the Lokomotiv Yaroslavl plane crash.

== Career statistics ==
			Regular season					Playoffs
Season	Team	League	GP	G	A	Pts	PIM	GP	G	A	Pts	PIM
1977-78	Prince Albert Raiders	SJHL	49	10	19	29	63	—	—	—	—	—
1978-79	Brandon Wheat Kings	WHL	40	15	24	39	139	18	0	7	7	23
1979-80	Brandon Wheat Kings	WHL	55	13	12	25	89	9	3	3	6	6
1980–81	University of Michigan	WCHA	35	0	8	8	30	—	—	—	—	—
1981–82	University of Michigan	CCHA	15	1	1	2	6	—	—	—	—	—
1982–83	University of Michigan	CCHA	32	5	13	18	20	—	—	—	—	—
1983–84	University of Michigan	CCHA	30	8	5	13	34	—	—	—	—	—
WHL totals			95	28	36	64	228	27	3	10	13	29
NCAA totals			112	21	26	47	100

== Head coaching record ==
Year	Team	W	L	OT/T	Finish	Postseason
1990–91	Brandon Wheat Kings	28	38	6	7th in East	Did not qualify
1990–91	Brandon Wheat Kings	19	51	2	8th in East	Did not qualify
1991–92	Brandon Wheat Kings	11	55	6	8th in East	Did not qualify
2004-05	Brandon Wheat Kings	45	21	6	1st in East	Lost in WHL finals
2005-06	Brandon Wheat Kings	30	32	10	3rd in East	Lost East Division quarter-final
2006-07	Brandon Wheat Kings	41	20	11	1st in East	Lost East Division semi-final
2007-08	Brandon Wheat Kings	42	24	6	3rd in East	Lost East Division quarter-final
2008-09	Brandon Wheat Kings	30	32	10	3rd in East	Lost East Division final
2009-10	Brandon Wheat Kings	50	18	4	3rd in East	Lost West Division final
2010-11	Brandon Wheat Kings	32	31	9	3rd in West	Lost East Division quarter-final
2013-14	Brandon Wheat Kings	45	23	4	3rd in East	Lost East Division final
2014-15	Brandon Wheat Kings	53	11	8	1st in East	Lost WHL finals
2015–16	Brandon Wheat Kings	48	18	6	1st in East	Won WHL Championship; Lost in Memorial Cup

Awards and achievements
Preceded by George McPhee	General manager of the Vegas Golden Knights; 2019–present	Incumbent
