= Bob Bourne =

Canadian ice hockey player (born 1954)

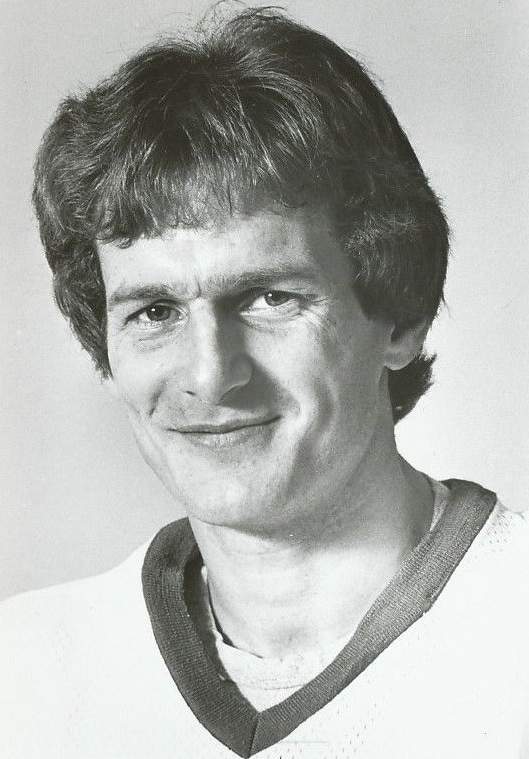
- Bourne with the New York Islanders in 1981
- Born: June 21, 1954 (age 71) Kindersley, Saskatchewan, Canada
- Height: 6 ft 3 in (191 cm)
- Weight: 200 lb (91 kg; 14 st 4 lb)
- Position: Centre
- Shot: Left
- Played for: New York Islanders; Los Angeles Kings
- NHL draft: 38th overall, 1974; Kansas City Scouts
- WHA draft: 17th overall, 1974; Indianapolis Racers
- Playing career: 1974–1988

Robert Glen Bourne (born June 21, 1954) is a Canadian former professional ice hockey centre who played for the New York Islanders and the Los Angeles Kings of the National Hockey League (NHL) between 1974 and 1988. He was a four-time Stanley Cup winner and 1984 Canada Cup champion. He was inducted into the New York Islanders Hall of Fame.

== Baseball career ==
Bourne was a skilled baseball player and signed with Major League Baseball's Houston Astros. He played one season for the Appalachian League Covington Astros in 1972 where he platooned at first base with future Hockey Hall of Famer Clark Gillies. Both left professional baseball after the season to focus on professional hockey.

== Playing career ==
Bourne was drafted 38th overall by the Kansas City Scouts in the 1974 NHL amateur draft, though he would never play for the organization. On September 13, 1974, he was traded to the Islanders for Bart Crashley and the rights to Larry Hornung.

Bourne spent the entire 1974–75 season with the Islanders, but found himself in the minor leagues the following year. He returned to the Islanders for the 1976–77 season, and spent the next ten seasons on Long Island, recording at least thirty goals three times and between twenty and thirty goals for three others. Known as "one of the fastest and most gifted skaters" in the league, he won the Stanley Cup four consecutive times — 1980, 1981, 1982, 1983. He led the Islanders in playoff scoring en route to their fourth Stanley Cup in 1983.

In 1980–81, he scored a career-high 35 goals and 76 points. He also played in the 33rd National Hockey League All-Star Game in Los Angeles in February 1981.

Bourne's career ended on a high note. He was claimed by the Los Angeles Kings in the 1986 NHL Waiver Draft and played two seasons with the Kings. In Bourne's final year in the NHL, he was awarded the Bill Masterton Trophy for perseverance. He was also honored by Sports Illustrated as one of several Sportsmen of the Year in 1987, as one of eight "Athletes Who Care" for their work in humanitarian causes. Bourne was singled out for his work with a school for disabled children.

== Coaching career ==
After retiring as a player, Bourne served as a coach for several minor league teams, including the Central Texas Stampede, Las Vegas Thunder and Utah Grizzlies.

== Accolades ==
Bourne was honored as the ninth member of the New York Islanders Hall of Fame on November 25, 2006. Though Bourne's number fourteen is not retired, he has joined the eight team members—six players, one coach and one general manager—whose numbers have been retired in the Islanders Hall. The other members are Denis Potvin, Mike Bossy, Billy Smith, Bryan Trottier, Clark Gillies, Bob Nystrom, Bill Torrey and Al Arbour. A banner commemorating Bourne's induction hangs in the Nassau Coliseum.

== Personal life ==
Bourne's son Justin is also a former professional hockey player who played 16 games in the American Hockey League. Justin is now a senior hockey analyst with Sportsnet NHL after serving two years as a video coach with the Toronto Marlies of the American Hockey League. Justin is married to Brianna, the daughter of Bob's former teammate, Clark Gillies.

== Career statistics ==
=== Regular season and playoffs ===
			Regular season					Playoffs
Season	Team	League	GP	G	A	Pts	PIM	GP	G	A	Pts	PIM
1971–72	Saskatoon Blades	WCHL	63	28	32	60	36	8	3	7	10	2
1972–73	Saskatoon Blades	WCHL	66	40	53	93	74	16	7	10	17	30
1973–74	Saskatoon Blades	WCHL	63	29	42	71	41	6	3	2	5	12
1974–75	New York Islanders	NHL	77	16	23	39	12	9	1	2	3	4
1975–76	Fort Worth Texans	CHL	62	29	44	73	80	—	—	—	—	—
1975–76	New York Islanders	NHL	14	2	3	5	13	—	—	—	—	—
1976–77	New York Islanders	NHL	75	16	19	35	30	8	2	0	2	4
1977–78	New York Islanders	NHL	80	30	33	63	31	7	2	3	5	2
1978–79	New York Islanders	NHL	80	30	31	61	48	10	1	3	4	6
1979–80	New York Islanders	NHL	73	15	25	40	52	21	10	10	20	10
1980–81	New York Islanders	NHL	78	35	41	76	62	14	4	6	10	19
1981–82	New York Islanders	NHL	76	27	26	53	77	19	9	7	16	36
1982–83	New York Islanders	NHL	77	20	42	62	55	20	8	20	28	14
1983–84	New York Islanders	NHL	78	22	34	56	75	8	1	1	2	7
1984–85	New York Islanders	NHL	44	8	12	20	51	10	0	2	2	6
1985–86	New York Islanders	NHL	62	17	15	32	36	3	0	0	0	0
1986–87	Los Angeles Kings	NHL	78	13	9	22	35	5	2	1	3	0
1987–88	Los Angeles Kings	NHL	72	7	11	18	28	5	0	1	1	0
NHL totals			964	258	324	582	605	139	40	56	96	108

=== International ===
Year	Team	Event	GP	G	A	Pts	PIM
1984	Canada	CC	8	0	3	3	0

Preceded by Doug Jarvis	Bill Masterton Trophy winner 1988	Succeeded by Tim Kerr
