= John Tonelli =

Canadian ice hockey player (born 1957)

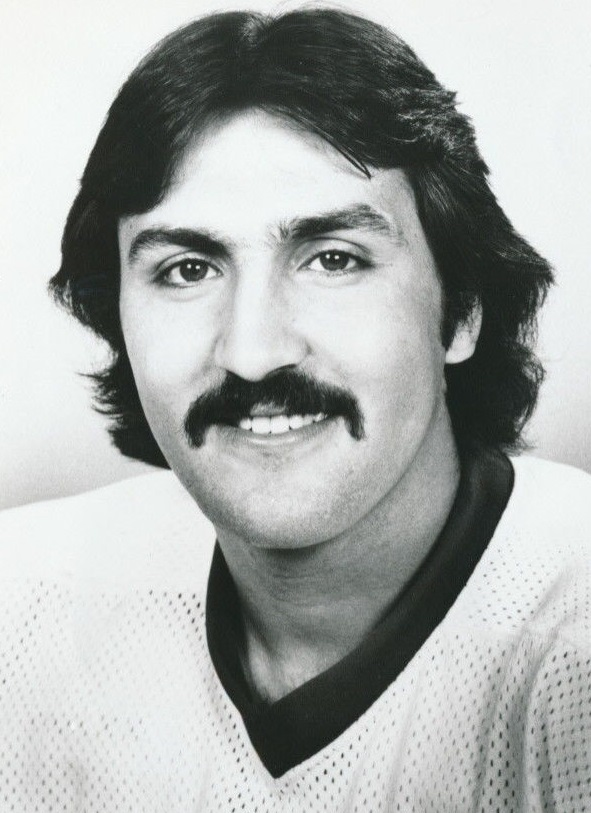
- Tonelli with the New York Islanders in 1980
- Born: March 23, 1957 (age 69) Hamilton, Ontario, Canada
- Height: 6 ft 1 in (185 cm)
- Weight: 200 lb (91 kg; 14 st 4 lb)
- Position: Left wing
- Shot: Left
- Played for: Houston Aeros; New York Islanders; Calgary Flames; Los Angeles Kings; Chicago Blackhawks; Quebec Nordiques
- National team: Canada
- NHL draft: 33rd overall, 1977; New York Islanders
- Playing career: 1975–1992

John Alexander Tonelli (born March 23, 1957) is a Canadian former professional ice hockey forward from Milton, Ontario. Tonelli made his debut as a professional player at 18 in 1975 with the Houston Aeros of the World Hockey Association, where he played his first three seasons, which included making the Avco Cup Final in his rookie season. He joined the New York Islanders of the National Hockey League in 1978; in eight seasons, he served as a key part of a team that advanced to the Stanley Cup Finals five consecutive years while winning four of them (1980-1983) in a row in the last great NHL dynasty, with Tonelli delivering the assist on Bob Nystrom's goal that won the 1980 Stanley Cup Final. Tonelli was traded late in the 1985-86 season to the Calgary Flames, where he reached the Stanley Cup Final that year, his seventh professional hockey league Final appearance as a player. He subsequently played with the Los Angeles Kings, Chicago Blackhawks, and the Quebec Nordiques.

In 2020, the Islanders honored Tonelli by retiring his #27 jersey, the seventh to be given the honor by the team while also joining the Islanders Hall of Fame.

== Early life ==
Tonelli was born at St. Joseph's Hospital in Hamilton, Ontario, on March 23, 1957, to his parents Alex Tonelli, Jr. and Joy Sclisizzi of Milton. He has an older brother Raymond, a younger brother David and a younger sister, Sandra. Tonelli's mother Joy Sclisizzi is a relative of Enio Sclisizzi, who was Milton's first NHLer.

As young man, Tonelli worked in Sclisizzi's bronze-plaque making factory where he washed the finished plaques.

Tonelli's father, who worked for 40 years in the steel business and set an example for his son for hard work, used to dam up the water in a culvert next to their home, which would freeze, and allowed Tonelli endless access to skating time near their home on Ontario St. in Milton.

Tonelli was a multi-sport athlete in his youth, serving as pitcher for the Red Sox in the Milton Minor Baseball Association in 1966, when he hit a grand slam in the same game he served as pitcher. In 1968, with his father as an assistant coach, Tonelli won an OBA championship for the Milton Mowbray Tykes. He had four one-hitters as a pitcher in the 1970 baseball season.

In 1971, he was Holy Rosary School's top basketball scorer with 42 points. In 1972, as a 15-year-old, he pitched a perfect game as a bantam baseball player. Tonelli began his hockey career in earnest when he played one year with the Milton Flyers of the Central Junior B Hockey League before joining the Marlies.

== Career ==
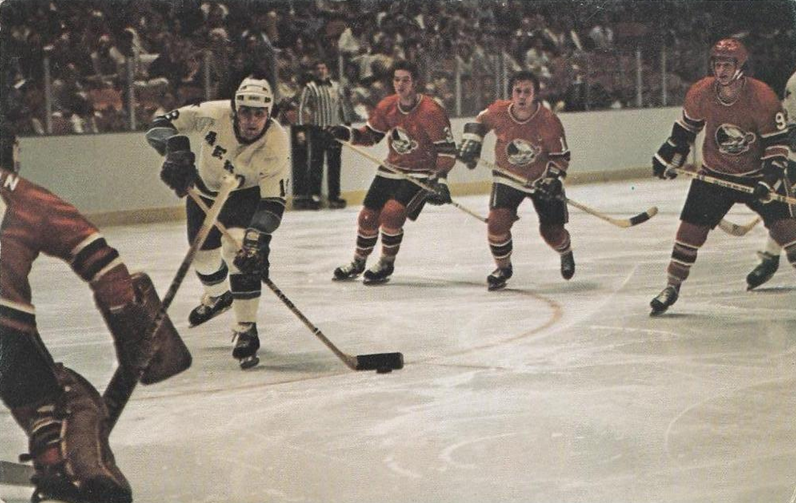
Tonelli with the Houston Aeros in 1975 against the Denver Spurs

Tonelli was the first 15-year-old player to be signed by the Toronto Marlies OHA team, and the first Miltonian to play with the Marlies since Murray "Cowboy" Grenke in the 1948–49 and 1949–50 seasons.

In his first season with them, Marlies' coach George Armstrong noted Tonelli was pro material.

=== Contract dispute between OHA and WHA ===
Tonelli was one of the first players to challenge the Ontario Hockey Association and the Marlies OHA team, with which he had signed a contract at age 16. As he reached age 18, the WHA's Houston team offered him a contract worth $500,000 ($2.2 million CAD in 2016), but his contract with the Marlies tied him to the OHA team for three years plus an option.

In June 1975, the WHA owners voted to void Tonelli's Houston contract. Tonelli's agent threatened to sue, and the Marlies asked for $100,000 in compensation, plus 20 percent of Tonelli's three-year WHA contract.

Tonelli refused to play for Toronto in the playoffs after he turned 18, so that it would not imperil his legal arguments. Tonelli's agent Gus Badali sued the Marlies and the OHA, while the Marlies sued Tonelli for breach of contract. Eventually, the Ontario courts ruled that Tonelli's OHA contract with the Marlies was unenforceable because Tonelli had been under the age of 18 when he signed it, and his parents had not signed it, and that the contract was an infant’s contract that was not in his best interests. Tonelli's teammate, future NHLer John Anderson, followed this same lead, sitting out for a period, but eventually returned to lead Toronto in the Memorial Cup. To this day, Tonelli's legal case serves as a notable precedent for major junior hockey player contracts and for the employment rights of young athletes in Ontario.

Tonelli played for Houston for three seasons. During his time in Houston, he was drafted by the New York Islanders in the second round (33rd overall) in the 1977 NHL Amateur Draft after Jim Devellano, who was the Islanders Director of Scouting, came and visited Tonelli in Houston. Devellano was the only NHL scout to come and personally visit Tonelli in Houston while Tonelli was there, taking him out to dinner to talk. In his rookie season, the Aeros sought to defend the Avco World Trophy, which they had won the last two seasons. They reached the Avco Cup Final once again but lost in a sweep to the Winnipeg Jets; Tonelli scored 14 points in 17 postseason games.

Up until 1977, Tonelli often suffered once or twice a year from devastating migraine headaches that started age 10 and that doctors said were caused by his intensity and nervousness at game time.

=== Move to Islanders ===
Tonelli's NHL rights were reclaimed by NY Islanders after the Houston WHA franchise folded in July 1978.

In 1982 and 1985, Tonelli was a second team All-Star left wing for the Islanders. He played in the Stanley Cup finals in 1980, 1981, 1982, 1983, and 1984 with the Islanders, winning four championships in the process, and made an additional appearance as runner-up in the Cup finals in 1986 with the Flames.

On May 24, 1980, Tonelli had the assist on Bob Nystrom's overtime Stanley Cup-winning goal against the Philadelphia Flyers, giving the Islanders their first of four straight Cups. In game six at Nassau Coliseum, Lorne Henning stole the puck at center ice, passed to Tonelli, who then criss-crossed with Nystrom, feeding him the puck on Nystrom's backhand for the winning goal at 7:11 of overtime. It was a play the two had perfected during practice. On January 6, 1981, Tonelli scored five goals in a game versus the Toronto Maple Leafs.

Tonelli was a gritty forward with a never-say-die attitude for the Islanders. Tonelli, who was affectionately dubbed "The Greasy Jet" by his teammates, is remembered for scoring important "clutch goals" in the Islanders' run of four straight Stanley Cups and five straight finals appearances, particularly during the 1981-82 season. During the playoffs that year, The Islanders were five minutes away from being eliminated by a much weaker Pittsburgh Penguin team, trailing 3-1 in the deciding game. Tonelli assisted on a Mike McEwen goal that closed the champions within one goal, and tied the game himself with 2:21 to play. For an encore, it was John Tonelli that scored in overtime to win the game for the Islanders, thus extending their long reign as Stanley Cup champions.

Tonelli also scored the winning goal in a February 20, 1982 game against the Colorado Rockies, beating former teammate Chico Resch with just 47 seconds to play to allow the Islanders to set an NHL record (since broken) with their 15th consecutive victory.

Early in his Islander days, Tonelli was a curiosity to his teammates. He arrived early and stayed late. He made demands of himself that were so harsh that coaches felt compelled to ask Tonelli to save some of that work for the games.

In his book, “Gretzky: An Autobiography” (1990), Wayne Gretzky states that, “I wouldn’t bench John Tonelli if he’d just stolen my car.”

He was known for being almost unbeatable in digging out the puck in the corners of the rink; however, Tonelli also had an excellent shot, was a good passer, and had excellent timing both offensively and defensively. Tonelli was also very versatile. During his eight seasons with the Islanders, coach Al Arbour used Tonelli on the famed "Banana Line" with Wayne Merrick and Bob Nystrom, on the top line with Bryan Trottier and Mike Bossy, and later he played flank for Brent Sutter and Patrick Flatley.

In his seventh season as a professional and his fourth with the Islanders, he scored 35 goals and 58 assists for 93 points, breaking Clark Gillies's club record for a left wing, 91, set in 1978-79.

Although Tonelli played a key role in the four Cup victories the team won from 1980 to 1983, in some ways his career culminated in the fall of 1984 when he played for Canada in the Canada Cup, an invitation he almost turned down. He not only made the team, he had nine points, including a key assist on Mike Bossy's goal in overtime of the semifinal. Canada won the championship and Tonelli was named the tournament's best player, winning the 1984 Canada Cup MVP award.

He then rejoined the Islanders and had his best season ever, scoring 42 goals and 100 points in 1984-1985.

=== Flames and Kings years ===
During fall 1985, Tonelli was a holdout and missed 22 days of training camp and the early regular season in a bitter standoff with the Islanders. Tonelli was the first player under contract in Islanders history to hold out. At the time, the New York Times estimated he was making $200,000 per year on a four-year contract. After returning to the Islanders and playing out most of the season, he was traded to the Calgary Flames on March 11, 1986, for Richard Kromm and Steve Konroyd. The Flames, with Tonelli's experience, reached the Stanley Cup Final for the first time in 1986.

As a free agent, Tonelli was offered a termination contract by the Flames after they benched him during some playoff games in 1988, but he instead signed for the 1988–89 season with the Los Angeles Kings, where he was put on a line with Wayne Gretzky at times. Gretzky was traded to the Kings six weeks after the Kings acquired Tonelli.

A book called Hockey Scouting Report, 1988-89, authored by former NHL goalie John Davidson, who had played for the Islanders' rival the New York Rangers — which lost to the Islanders in the playoffs in 1981, 1982 and 1983 — and a couple of other writers, did a report on Tonelli that made his eyes water. "I don't want to point any fingers", Tonelli at the time. "Let's just say that the nature of the game is that some guys out there hold grudges a long time."

The book stated about Tonelli: "Once a good skater with a lot of power, Tonelli's skills are now on the downslide. He doesn't have the acceleration he once did, and for a straight-ahead player who had little agility, loss of speed and power is the worst loss that could be suffered. He retains a kind of laziness he's long had, in that he won't backcheck as well as he should, sort of coasting back to save his energy for another offensive rush."

However, Tonelli rewarded the Kings' faith in him by scoring back-to-back 31-goal seasons in 1988–89 and 1989–90.

During summer 1989, he entered a contract stand-off with Kings GM Rogie Vachon before a deal was reached during the pre-season. "You know, I went through a holdout with the Islanders in '86, and that was terrible. I was out for 23 days and it became a bitter thing. That's something that I didn't want to have happen here. I told you that I was looking at other teams this summer. My agent was, really. My heart was right here", said Tonelli.

=== Later years ===
In May 1991, the Kings left Tonelli unprotected in the NHL expansion draft. Then a free-agent, he said he sensed the Kings were not interested in his returning next season and instead signed with the Chicago Blackhawks.

On February 18, 1992, Tonelli was traded to the Quebec Nordiques by Chicago for future considerations. He finished the season there before retiring.

Tonelli finished his 1028-game NHL career with 325 goals and 511 assists for 836 points.

== Personal life ==
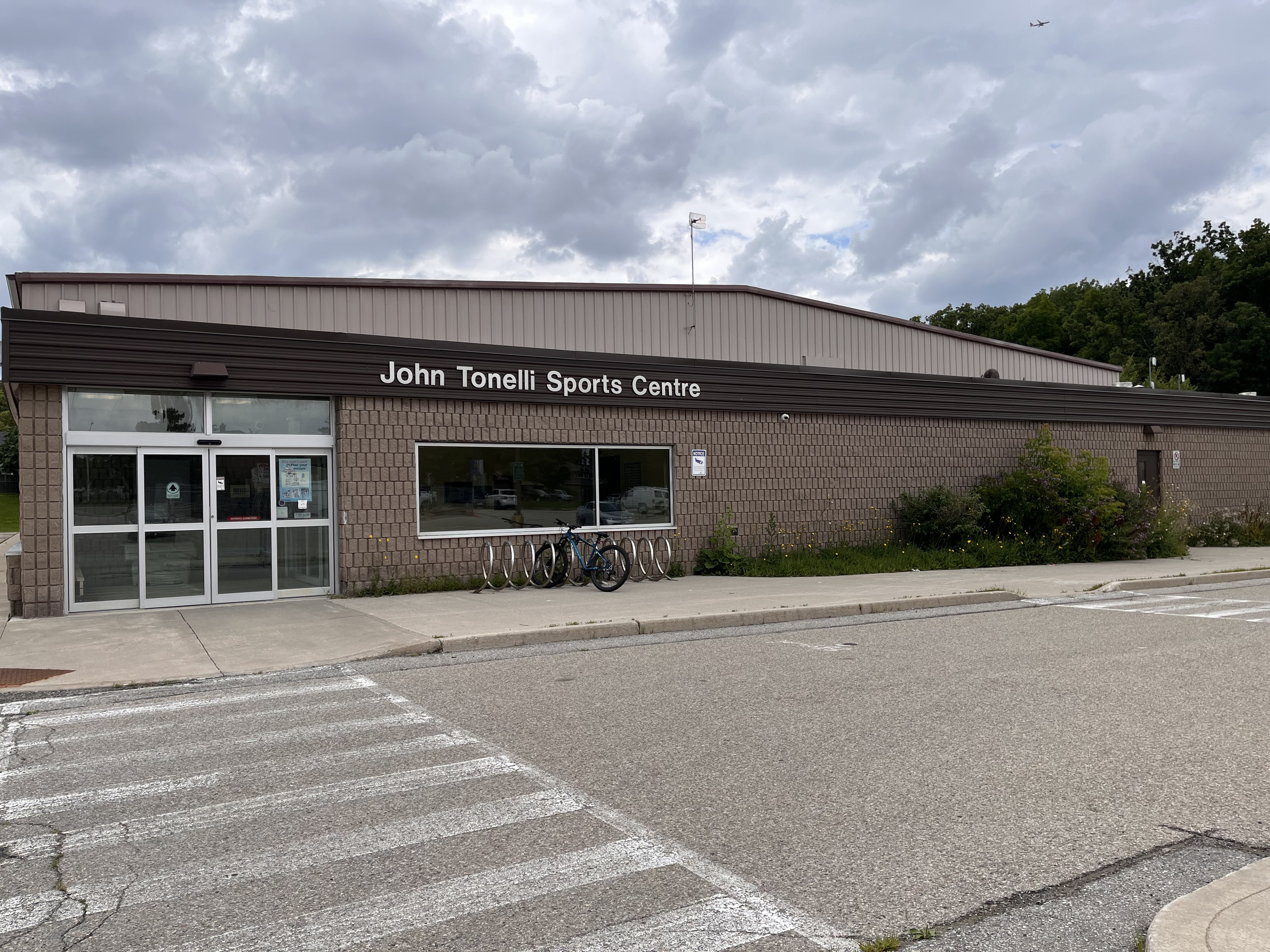
The John Tonelli Arena in Milton, Ontario

The John Tonelli Arena in Milton, Ontario is named in his honour. In 2021 it was announced that the sports centre had secured investment from the Government of Canada and from the town of Milton to upgrade and make improvements to the skating rink as well as to spectator facilities and access.

His older brother Ray was also a hockey and baseball player, and Tonelli's cousin is former NHLer Ryan Jones.

With his ex-wife Karen, John has two daughters and a son, Jennifer, Ashley, Ryan and with his current wife Lauren he has 2 sons, Jordan, 19, and Zackary, 18. Tonelli coached his sons' hockey teams when they were younger. Zach and Jordan both play hockey for Brown University.

Tonelli is the only player in history to score a regular-season goal on an assist by Gordie Howe and another regular-season goal on an assist by Wayne Gretzky.

== Awards ==
- Stanley Cup champion - 1980, 1981, 1982, 1983
- OMJHL First All-Star Team (1975)
- Most valuable player of the 1984 Canada Cup tournament.
- Named to the NHL Second All-Star Team in 1982 and 1985
- Played in NHL All-Star Game (1982, 1985)
- Inducted into the inaugural class of the Milton Sports Hall of Fame in 2016
- Inducted into the Milton Walk of Fame in 2007
- Jersey #27 retired by the New York Islanders organization (2020)

== Career statistics ==
=== Regular season and playoffs ===
			Regular season					Playoffs
Season	Team	League	GP	G	A	Pts	PIM	GP	G	A	Pts	PIM
1972–73	Milton Flyers	CJHL	40	20	25	45	—	—	—	—	—	—
1973–74	Toronto Marlboros	OHA	69	18	37	55	62	—	—	—	—	—
1974–75	Toronto Marlboros	OMJHL	70	49	86	135	85	—	—	—	—	—
1975–76	Houston Aeros	WHA	79	14	17	31	66	17	7	7	14	18
1976–77	Houston Aeros	WHA	80	24	31	55	109	11	3	4	7	12
1977–78	Houston Aeros	WHA	65	23	41	64	103	6	1	3	4	8
1978–79	New York Islanders	NHL	73	17	39	56	44	10	1	6	7	0
1979–80	New York Islanders	NHL	77	14	30	44	49	21	7	9	16	18
1980–81	New York Islanders	NHL	70	20	32	52	57	16	5	8	13	16
1981–82	New York Islanders	NHL	80	35	58	93	57	19	6	10	16	18
1982–83	New York Islanders	NHL	76	31	40	71	55	20	7	11	18	20
1983–84	New York Islanders	NHL	73	27	40	67	66	17	1	3	4	31
1984–85	New York Islanders	NHL	80	42	58	100	95	10	1	8	9	10
1985–86	New York Islanders	NHL	65	20	41	61	50	—	—	—	—	—
1985–86	Calgary Flames	NHL	9	3	4	7	10	22	7	9	16	49
1986–87	Calgary Flames	NHL	78	20	31	51	72	3	0	0	0	4
1987–88	Calgary Flames	NHL	74	17	41	58	84	6	2	5	7	8
1988–89	Los Angeles Kings	NHL	71	31	33	64	110	6	0	0	0	8
1989–90	Los Angeles Kings	NHL	73	31	37	68	62	10	1	2	3	6
1990–91	Los Angeles Kings	NHL	71	14	16	30	49	12	2	4	6	12
1991–92	Chicago Blackhawks	NHL	33	1	7	8	37	—	—	—	—	—
1991–92	Quebec Nordiques	NHL	19	2	4	6	14	—	—	—	—	—
WHA totals			224	61	89	150	278	34	11	14	25	38
NHL totals			1,028	325	511	836	911	172	40	75	115	200

=== International ===
Year	Team	Event	GP	G	A	Pts	PIM
1984	Canada	CC	8	3	6	9	2
Senior totals			8	3	6	9	2

== See also ==
- Notable families in the NHL
- List of NHL players with 1,000 games played
