= Ray Cote =

Canadian ice hockey player (born 1961)

- Born: May 31, 1961 (age 64) Pincher Creek, Alberta, Canada
- Height: 5 ft 11 in (180 cm)
- Weight: 160 lb (73 kg; 11 st 6 lb)
- Position: Centre
- Shot: Right
- Played for: Edmonton Oilers
- National team: Canada
- NHL draft: Undrafted
- Playing career: 1981–1999

Ray Cote (born May 31, 1961) is a former professional ice hockey forward. He spent his junior career with the Calgary Wranglers of the WHL and signed a free agent contract with the Edmonton Oilers in 1981 after going undrafted. Cote spent the majority of his career in the minor leagues and European leagues but saw three separate stints with the Oilers. His only career NHL points were recorded in the 1982–83 playoffs. In the 1983 playoffs, he and George McPhee of the New York Rangers became the first players to score three goals in a single postseason before playing a regular season NHL game. He also played for the Canadian National Team on four occasions.

== Career statistics ==
			Regular season					Playoffs
Season	Team	League	GP	G	A	Pts	PIM	GP	G	A	Pts	PIM
1977–78	Pincher Creek Chinooks	AJHL	59	13	34	47	12	—	—	—	—	—
1977–78	Billings Bighorns	WCHL	2	0	1	1	0	—	—	—	—	—
1978–79	Calgary Chinooks	AJHL	53	17	30	47	35	—	—	—	—	—
1978–79	Calgary Wranglers	WHL	7	2	1	3	0	15	4	8	12	8
1979–80	Calgary Wranglers	WHL	72	33	34	67	43	7	2	6	8	0
1980–81	Calgary Wranglers	WHL	70	36	52	88	73	22	10	13	23	11
1981–82	Wichita Wind	CHL	80	20	34	54	83	7	3	2	5	2
1982–83	Moncton Alpines	AHL	80	28	63	91	35	—	—	—	—	—
1982–83	Edmonton Oilers	NHL	—	—	—	—	—	14	3	2	5	4
1983–84	Moncton Alpines	AHL	66	26	36	62	99	—	—	—	—	—
1983–84	Edmonton Oilers	NHL	13	0	0	0	2	—	—	—	—	—
1984–85	Nova Scotia Oilers	AHL	79	36	43	79	63	6	2	3	5	0
1984–85	Edmonton Oilers	NHL	2	0	0	0	2	—	—	—	—	—
1985–86	Nova Scotia Oilers	AHL	20	7	3	10	17	—	—	—	—	—
1985–86	Schwenninger ERC	Germany	18	12	11	23	14	—	—	—	—	—
1985–86	Genève-Servette HC	NLB	6	1	2	3	11	—	—	—	—	—
1986–87	Adirondack Red Wings	AHL	—	—	—	—	—	8	2	6	8	2
1987–88	Wiener EV	Austria	21	12	9	21	10	—	—	—	—	—
1988–89	Wiener EV	Austria	40	18	33	51	—	—	—	—	—	—
1989–90	Boro HC	Division 1	31	19	23	42	38	—	—	—	—	—
1990–91	SC Herisau	NLB	14	17	13	30	4	—	—	—	—	—
1991–92	Mannheimer ERC	Germany	11	3	8	11	0	—	—	—	—	—
1991–92	HC Davos	NLB	3	1	0	1	0	—	—	—	—	—
1998–99	ESV Bayreuth	Germany3	14	5	4	9	8	—	—	—	—	—
NHL totals			15	0	0	0	4	14	3	2	5	4
AHL totals			245	97	145	242	214	14	4	9	13	2
