= Bob Nystrom =

Canadian ice hockey player

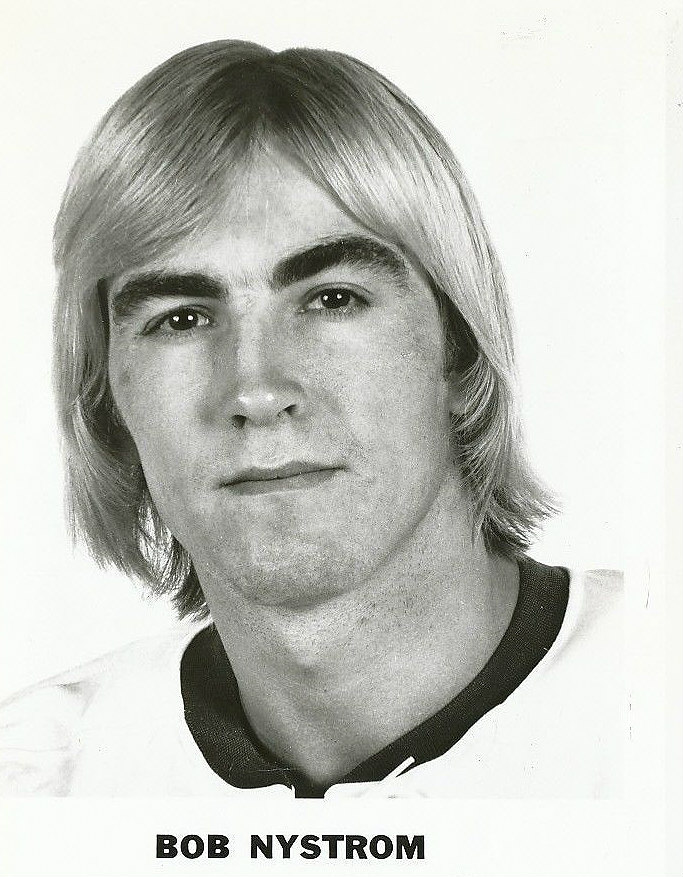
- Nystrom with the New York Islanders in 1973
- Born: October 10, 1952 (age 73) Stockholm, Sweden
- Height: 6 ft 1 in (185 cm)
- Weight: 200 lb (91 kg; 14 st 4 lb)
- Position: Right wing
- Shot: Right
- Played for: New York Islanders
- NHL draft: 33rd overall, 1972; New York Islanders
- Playing career: 1972–1986

Robert Thore Nystrom (born October 10, 1952) is a Swedish–Canadian former professional ice hockey right winger. He played for the New York Islanders of the National Hockey League (NHL) from 1972 to 1986. He is best remembered as having scored the Stanley Cup-winning goal at the 7:11 mark of overtime during game six of the 1980 Stanley Cup Final. This signaled the first of four straight championships for the Islanders. He was also among the last NHL players to not wear a helmet during a game.

Nystrom played minor hockey in Hinton, Alberta, where he is included on the town's wall of fame. He is an NHL player from the same geographical area as Dave Scatchard and Dean McAmmond.

His son Eric last played professional hockey for Norway's Stavanger Oilers, and previously played for the Nashville Predators, Calgary Flames, Minnesota Wild, and Dallas Stars of the NHL.

== Early career ==
Born Thore Robert Nyström in Stockholm, Sweden, Nystrom moved to Hinton, Alberta as a four-year-old and later starred for the BCJHL's Kamloops Rockets in 1969–70. He was an emotional sparkplug on the Calgary Centennials of the WCJHL for two seasons, and was claimed 33rd overall by the Islanders in 1972. He played half a season for minor league affiliate New Haven Nighthawks of the American Hockey League before being promoted to the Islanders in March 1973, wearing number 5.

Nystrom's first full season with the Islanders was 1973–74, when he tallied 41 points as a rookie, garnering Calder Memorial Trophy consideration as rookie of the year (the award eventually went to teammate Denis Potvin). As Potvin now used number 5, Nystrom wore number 23.

Over the next four seasons, as the Islander team improved, Nystrom became one of the steadiest two-way forwards in the league. In each of his first five seasons he collected over 20 goals, including a career-high 30 in 1977–78, while playing a strong checking and defensive game as well. He was also selected to play in the 1977 NHL All-Star Game.

== Stanley Cups and "Mr. Islander" ==
Nystrom was a prominent member of the New York Islanders during their rise to become one of the most respected clubs in the NHL. Nystrom, known for his physical style of play, was nicknamed "Thor" by his teammates. He worked to improve his technical skating abilities through regular power skating classes, including training with instructor Laura Stamm and eventually, became a capable skater with strong hockey instincts.

As with many of the Islanders of the early 1980s, those instincts seemed to be more in tune when the playoffs rolled around. Nystrom has been known as one of the all-time clutch players in NHL Stanley Cup playoff history. He tallied 39 goals and 83 points in 157 playoff games; however he is most noted for his knack for sudden death overtime winners. Nystrom ended playoff overtime games four times in his career. On May 24, 1980, in game six of the Stanley Cup Final against the Philadelphia Flyers, Nystrom scored the game winner at 7:11 of overtime on an assist from John Tonelli to secure the first Stanley Cup in franchise history.

Nystrom was part of the first NHL team (1979–80 New York Islanders) to win a Stanley Cup with Europeans on its roster. Nystrom is still able to speak a little Swedish, and he was invited to play for Sweden in the 1981 Canada Cup. He was however forced to decline as he had not yet negotiated a new contract with the Islanders and hence did not want to risk injury.

Nystrom embraced the Long Island community, contributing to various charities in the area and promoting the local businesses whenever possible. By virtue of these distinctions, and coupled with the most famous goal in team history, Nystrom was nicknamed "Mr. Islander".

== Later years ==
Nystrom continued to be an effective winger through the Islanders' Stanley Cup run, but by 1985, his rugged, aggressive play began to wear his body down. He played only 36 games in 1984–85, managing only two goals, though he matched that total in only ten postseason games.

After playing sparingly through the first three months of the 1985–86 season, Nystrom was accidentally struck in the eye by a high stick from teammate Gerald Diduck in practice on January 5. Unable to play due to the severity of the injury (he suffered two tears of the retina, which nearly cost him his eye and later required surgery), he was thought to have retired, and he served as an assistant coach for the remainder of the season.

Nystrom had played in 899 regular season games at the time. The Islanders' coach, Al Arbour, who considered Nystrom one of his favorites, approached Nystrom prior to the Islanders' last home game of the 1985–86 season on April 5, and asked him if he would like to dress one more game, in order to make it an even 900 games played and to give Islanders fans a chance to say a proper good-bye. Nystrom accepted, and was added to the starting lineup. He took the opening face-off to a surprised and appreciative home crowd's roar. After skating around for about five seconds, he returned to the bench, never to play again.

Nystrom remained an assistant coach the next two seasons, then served as radio analyst for the Islanders. He was named Islanders director of corporate affairs in 1988 and remained in that position through 1988–89 season, when he took a position as Islanders director of special projects in 1989 and remained in that position through 1990–91 season. He was named Islanders director of community relations in 1991 and director of amateur hockey development and alumni relations in 1992. In 1997 he added the title director of corporate relations and remained in that position through 2001–02 season.

The Islanders retired his No. 23 on April 1, 1995, although three other players had worn it after Nystrom.

In 2003, he was inducted into the Nassau County Sports Hall of Fame. He is also a member of the National Jewish Sports Hall of Fame. He received the George Young Award, given to that individual, Jewish or non-Jewish, who has best exemplified the high ideals that George Young displayed, from the U.S. National Jewish Sports Hall of Fame and Museum in 2003.

== Personal life ==
A resident of Syosset, New York, and Boca Raton, Florida, Nystrom has two children – Marissa and Eric, who was drafted by the Calgary Flames as the 10th overall pick of the 2002 NHL entry draft. Eric is Jewish as is his mother.

== Bob Nystrom Award ==
In 1991, the Islanders began presenting the Bob Nystrom Award to the player "who best exemplifies leadership, hustle, and dedication".

== Career statistics ==
=== Regular season and playoffs ===
			Regular season					Playoffs
Season	Team	League	GP	G	A	Pts	PIM	GP	G	A	Pts	PIM
1969–70	Kamloops Rockets	BCHL	48	16	17	33	—	—	—	—	—	—
1970–71	Calgary Centennials	WCHL	66	15	16	31	153	10	2	3	5	32
1971–72	Calgary Centennials	WCHL	64	27	25	52	178	11	3	6	9	27
1972–73	New Haven Nighthawks	AHL	60	12	10	22	114	—	—	—	—	—
1972–73	New York Islanders	NHL	11	1	1	2	10	—	—	—	—	—
1973–74	New York Islanders	NHL	77	21	20	41	118	—	—	—	—	—
1974–75	New York Islanders	NHL	76	27	28	55	122	17	1	3	4	27
1975–76	New York Islanders	NHL	80	23	25	48	106	13	3	6	9	30
1976–77	New York Islanders	NHL	80	29	27	56	91	12	0	2	2	7
1977–78	New York Islanders	NHL	80	30	29	59	94	7	3	1	4	14
1978–79	New York Islanders	NHL	78	19	20	39	113	10	3	2	5	4
1979–80	New York Islanders	NHL	67	21	18	39	94	20	9	9	18	50
1980–81	New York Islanders	NHL	79	14	30	44	145	18	6	6	12	20
1981–82	New York Islanders	NHL	74	22	25	47	103	15	5	5	10	32
1982–83	New York Islanders	NHL	74	10	20	30	98	20	7	6	13	15
1983–84	New York Islanders	NHL	74	15	29	44	80	15	0	2	2	8
1984–85	New York Islanders	NHL	36	2	5	7	58	10	2	2	4	29
1985–86	New York Islanders	NHL	14	1	1	2	16	—	—	—	—	—
NHL totals			900	235	278	513	1,248	157	39	44	83	236
