= Jim Gregory General Manager of the Year Award =

Ice hockey award

- Sport: Ice hockey
- Awarded for: Top National Hockey League general manager

History
- First award: 2009–10 NHL season
- First winner: Don Maloney
- Most wins: Jim Nill (3)
- Most recent: Bill Guerin; Minnesota Wild

The Jim Gregory General Manager of the Year Award is awarded annually to the top National Hockey League general manager as voted by "a 42-member panel that included all 32 general managers, five NHL executives and five media members." First awarded in 2010, the award was renamed in 2019 after the death of former NHL executive Jim Gregory. The current title holder is Bill Guerin of the Minnesota Wild.

== History ==
In 1993, Brian Burke, who was at the time working for the league, suggested the General Manager of the Year Award. However, it was not created until the 2009–10 season. It was presented during the 2010 Stanley Cup Finals at the annual GM meeting, rather than during the Awards ceremony with the majority of the other NHL Awards. The next season, it was announced that the award would be included in the full ceremony.

On November 19, 2019, the NHL announced it would rename the award in honour of Jim Gregory, the recently deceased former general manager of the Toronto Maple Leafs and former NHL executive. The official name is changed to the "Jim Gregory General Manager of the Year Award."

On June 22, 2021, New York Islanders General Manager Lou Lamoriello became the first general manager to win the award twice.

On June 27, 2025, Dallas Stars General Manager Jim Nill became the first general manager to win the award three times.

== Winners ==
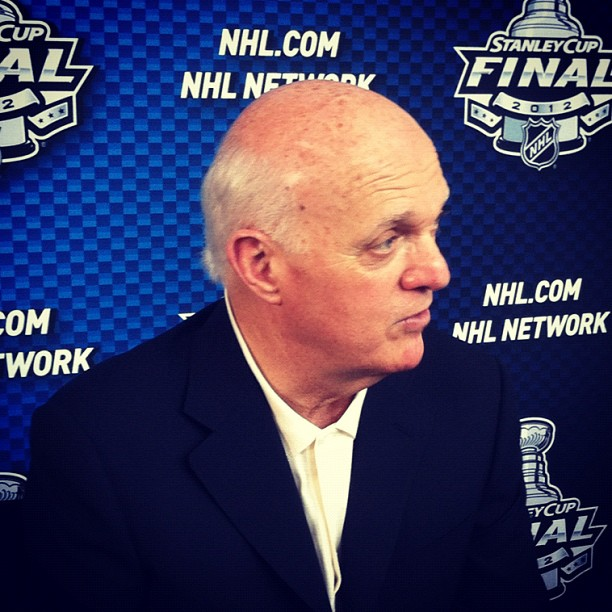
Lou Lamoriello, first executive with multiple wins, which were won consecutively in 2019–20 and 2020–21.

Key

^ Manager is still active
† Manager's team won the Stanley Cup

Season	Winner	Team	Win #
2009–10	Don Maloney	Phoenix Coyotes	1
2010–11	Mike Gillis	Vancouver Canucks	1
2011–12	Doug Armstrong	St. Louis Blues	1
2012–13	Ray Shero	Pittsburgh Penguins	1
2013–14	Bob Murray	Anaheim Ducks	1
2014–15	Steve Yzerman	Tampa Bay Lightning	1
2015–16	Jim Rutherford	Pittsburgh Penguins†	1
2016–17	David Poile	Nashville Predators	1
2017–18	George McPhee	Vegas Golden Knights	1
2018–19	Don Sweeney^	Boston Bruins	1
2019–20	Lou Lamoriello	New York Islanders	1
2020–21	Lou Lamoriello	New York Islanders	2
2021–22	Joe Sakic^	Colorado Avalanche†	1
2022–23	Jim Nill^	Dallas Stars	1
2023–24	Jim Nill^	Dallas Stars	2
2024–25	Jim Nill^	Dallas Stars	3
2025–26	Bill Guerin^	Minnesota Wild	1

== See also ==
- List of National Hockey League awards
- List of NHL General Managers
