= Gary Lupul =

- Born: April 20, 1959; Powell River, British Columbia, Canada
- Died: July 18, 2007 (aged 48); Burnaby, British Columbia, Canada
- Height: 5 ft 9 in (175 cm)
- Weight: 172 lb (78 kg; 12 st 4 lb)
- Position: Centre/Left wing
- Shot: Left
- Played for: Vancouver Canucks
- NHL draft: Undrafted
- Playing career: 1979–1986

Gary John Lupul (April 20, 1959 – July 18, 2007) was a Canadian professional ice hockey player who played for the Vancouver Canucks of the National Hockey League.

== Playing career ==
Born and raised in Powell River, British Columbia, Lupul played his junior hockey career with the Nanaimo Clippers and the Victoria Cougars of the Western Hockey League.

He signed a free agent contract with the Canucks a day prior to the team opening their training camp in Powell River. Lupul, at 5-foot-9 in height and 175 pounds, immediately demonstrated his feistiness by fighting Gerry Minor in his first day at training camp.

Lupul, known as the Pride of Powell River, played seven seasons as a forward with the Canucks, from 1979 to 1986. In 1982, he scored five points in 10 playoff games as Vancouver made it to the Stanley Cup finals for the first time.

Lupul had his best years in 1983 and 1984 playing on a line with Lars Molin and Dave "Tiger" Williams.

In 1984, Lupul was the first NHL player to fight Mario Lemieux and did so in Mario's home debut in his rookie season. Horribly overmatched by the much larger Lemieux, Lupul had to be rescued by goaltender John Garrett, who was then given a game misconduct for being the third player in the fight.

== Post-playing career ==
Following retirement from professional hockey, Lupul was a junior and college scout for the Vancouver Canucks in Ontario. The Canucks first hired him to help Lupul address a substance abuse problem.

Lupul, who was known to have cardiovascular concerns, was found lifeless in his nephew's Burnaby condo.

Lupul was of Ukrainian descent.

== Career statistics ==
=== Regular season and playoffs ===
			Regular season					Playoffs
Season	Team	League	GP	G	A	Pts	PIM	GP	G	A	Pts	PIM
1975–76	Nanaimo Clippers	BCJHL	66	49	68	117	—	—	—	—	—	—
1975–76	Victoria Cougars	WCHL	4	1	1	2	2	1	0	0	0	0
1976–77	Victoria Cougars	WCHL	71	38	63	101	116	4	1	0	1	2
1977–78	Victoria Cougars	WCHL	59	37	49	86	79	13	6	15	21	2
1978–79	Victoria Cougars	WHL	71	53	54	107	85	15	10	14	24	19
1979–80	Dallas Black Hawks	CHL	26	9	15	24	4	—	—	—	—	—
1979–80	Vancouver Canucks	NHL	51	9	11	20	24	4	1	0	1	0
1980–81	Vancouver Canucks	NHL	7	0	2	2	2	—	—	—	—	—
1980–81	Dallas Black Hawks	CHL	53	25	32	57	27	6	4	1	5	5
1981–82	Dallas Black Hawks	CHL	31	22	17	39	76	—	—	—	—	—
1981–82	Vancouver Canucks	NHL	41	10	7	17	26	10	2	3	5	4
1982–83	Fredericton Express	AHL	35	16	26	42	48	—	—	—	—	—
1982–83	Vancouver Canucks	NHL	40	18	10	28	46	4	1	3	4	2
1983–84	Vancouver Canucks	NHL	69	17	27	44	51	4	0	1	1	7
1984–85	Vancouver Canucks	NHL	66	12	17	29	82	—	—	—	—	—
1985–86	Vancouver Canucks	NHL	19	4	1	5	12	3	0	0	0	0
1985–86	Fredericton Express	AHL	43	13	2	15	76	3	2	0	2	4
1986–87	EV Brunico	ITA	42	28	38	66	34	—	—	—	—	—
1987–88	Berlin Capitals	GER	11	1	2	3	6	16	16	20	36	14
1987–88	EHC Kloten	SUI	—	—	—	—	—	1	1	0	1	0
NHL totals			293	70	75	145	243	25	4	7	11	13

=== International ===
Year	Team	Event	GP	G	A	Pts	PIM
1979	Canada	WJC	5	2	1	3	0
Junior totals			5	2	1	3	0
