= List of Vancouver Canucks general managers =

The Vancouver Canucks are a professional ice hockey team based in Vancouver, British Columbia. The Canucks are a member of the Pacific Division in the Western Conference of the National Hockey League (NHL). The Canucks currently play home games at Rogers Arena. The Canucks joined the NHL in 1970 as an expansion team, along with the Buffalo Sabres. They have advanced to the Stanley Cup Final three times but were defeated by the New York Islanders in 1982, the New York Rangers in 1994, and the Boston Bruins in 2011. The franchise has had 13 general managers since its inception.

== Key ==
Key of terms and definitions
Term	Definition
No.	Number of general managers^{[a]}
Ref(s)	References
–	Does not apply
†	Elected to the Hockey Hall of Fame in the Builder category

== General managers ==
General managers of the Vancouver Canucks
No.	Name	Tenure	Accomplishments during this term	Ref(s)
1	Bud Poile†	February 25, 1970 – April 1973		
2	Hal Laycoe	April 1973 – January 31, 1974		
3	Phil Maloney	January 31, 1974 – May 31, 1977	1 division title and 2 playoff appearances	
4	Jake Milford†	May 31, 1977 – June 1982	1 Stanley Cup Final appearance (1982); 1 conference title and 4 playoff appearances	
5	Harry Neale	June 1982 – May 23, 1985	2 playoff appearances	
6	Jack Gordon	June 4, 1985 – June 1, 1987	1 playoff appearance	
7	Pat Quinn†	June 1, 1987 – November 4, 1997	1 Stanley Cup Final appearance (1994); 1 conference title, 2 division titles, and 7 playoff appearances	
–	Mike Keenan (acting)	November 14, 1997 – June 22, 1998		
8	Brian Burke	June 22, 1998 – May 3, 2004	1 division title and 4 playoff appearances	
9	Dave Nonis	May 6, 2004 – April 14, 2008	1 division title and 1 playoff appearance	
10	Mike Gillis	April 23, 2008 – April 8, 2014	1 Stanley Cup Final appearance (2011); Won Presidents' Trophy 2 times (2010–11, 2011–12); Won General Manager of the Year Award (2010–11); 2 conference titles, 5 division titles, and 5 playoff appearances	
11	Jim Benning	May 21, 2014 – December 5, 2021	2 playoff appearances	
–	Stan Smyl (acting)	December 5, 2021 – December 9, 2021		
–	Jim Rutherford (acting)	December 9, 2021 – January 26, 2022		
12	Patrik Allvin	January 26, 2022 – April 17, 2026	1 division title and 1 playoff appearance	
13	Ryan Johnson	May 14, 2026 – present		

== See also ==
- List of current NHL general managers

== Notes ==
- ^{a} A running total of the number of general managers of the franchise. Thus any general manager who has two or more separate terms as general manager is only counted once.
