= 1982 Stanley Cup Final =

1982 ice hockey championship series

	1	2	3	4	Total
New York Islanders	6*	6	3	3	4
Vancouver Canucks	5*	4	0	1	0
- * – Denotes overtime period(s)
- Location(s): Uniondale: Nassau Veterans Memorial Coliseum (1, 2); Vancouver: Pacific Coliseum (3, 4)
- Coaches: New York: Al Arbour; Vancouver: Roger Neilson
- Captains: New York: Denis Potvin; Vancouver: Kevin McCarthy (Note: Due to injury, McCarthy did not play in any playoff games. Stan Smyl served as acting captain.)
- Referees: Wally Harris, Andy Van Hellemond, Ron Wicks
- Dates: May 8–16, 1982
- MVP: Mike Bossy (Islanders)
- Series-winning goal: Mike Bossy (5:00, second)
- Hall of Famers: Islanders: Mike Bossy (1991); Clark Gillies (2002); Denis Potvin (1991); Billy Smith (1993); Bryan Trottier (1997); Canucks: Colin Campbell (2024, builder); Coaches: Al Arbour (1996); Roger Neilson (2002); Officials: John D'Amico (1993); Andy Van Hellemond (1999)
- Networks: Canada: (English): CBC (French): SRC; United States: (National): USA Network (New York City area): SportsChannel New York (1–2), WOR (3–4)
- Announcers: (CBC) Bob Cole, Mickey Redmond, and Dick Irvin Jr. (1–2); and Jim Robson, Howie Meeker, and Gary Dornhoefer (3–4) (SRC) Rene Lecavalier and Gilles Tremblay (USA Network) Dan Kelly and Gary Green (SCNY/WOR) Jiggs McDonald and Ed Westfall

The 1982 Stanley Cup Final was the championship series of the National Hockey League's (NHL) 1981–82 season, and the culmination of the 1982 Stanley Cup playoffs. It was played between the Campbell Conference champion Vancouver Canucks in their first Final appearance and the Wales Conference and defending Cup champion New York Islanders, in their third Final appearance. The Islanders swept the Canucks to win their third consecutive and overall Stanley Cup championship. The Islanders became the first (and still only) U.S.-based team to three-peat as Stanley Cup champions, and the third franchise overall to three-peat as Stanley Cup champions, joining the Toronto Maple Leafs and Montreal Canadiens. The 1981–82 Canucks are one of two Stanley Cup finalist teams without any Hall of Fame players on their roster, the other being the 1996 Florida Panthers. Additionally, this marks the first time since 1955, and in 17 Cup Final attempts, that a U.S.-based team defeated a Canada-based team in the championship round, having lost 16 straight Cup Final series against Canadian teams.

This 1982 Final took place under a geographically revised NHL divisional alignment and playoff structure, which de facto revived the "East vs. West" format for the Final that had been abandoned when the Western Hockey League folded in 1926. It was also the first time a team from Western Canada contested the Final since the WHL stopped challenging for the Stanley Cup (the Victoria Cougars, who had also been the last team from British Columbia to win the Cup in 1925, played the 1926 Final too). This would also be the first of nine consecutive Final contested by a team from Western Canada, but it was the only one of them to feature the Vancouver Canucks; the other eight were contested by a team from Alberta (Edmonton Oilers appeared in six, Calgary Flames in two).

Starting this season home-ice advantage would alternate between conferences as opposed to going to the team with the better record. The latter change would also be of no effect for these Final since for even years the Wales champion received that advantage and in 1982 their representative, the Islanders, had the better record.

== Paths to the Final ==
=== Vancouver Canucks ===
Vancouver, despite having a losing record in the regular season, reached their first Stanley Cup Final in franchise history. In the first round they swept the Calgary Flames. In the next round they defeated the Los Angeles Kings in five games; after the Kings had upset the Edmonton Oilers and 92-goal scorer Wayne Gretzky in five games which was dubbed the Miracle on Manchester. In the conference finals, the Canucks defeated the Chicago Blackhawks in five games.

=== New York Islanders ===
The Islanders' route to the Final was slightly harder than Vancouver's. In the first round, the Islanders edged out the Pittsburgh Penguins 3–2. In the second round, they defeated their cross-town rivals in the New York Rangers in six games. In the conference finals, the Islanders swept the Quebec Nordiques to make it to the Final for the third year in a row.

With New York having 118 points and Vancouver having 77, the 41-point difference between the two teams in a final round is the largest in Stanley Cup Final history.

== Game summaries ==
The series then shifted to Vancouver, where the Canucks were boosted by a boisterous, towel-waving Vancouver crowd and had a great first period, but failed to score on Billy Smith, who was brilliant. The Islanders went on to win 3–0, and then completed the sweep with a 3–1 victory on May 16 to win their third straight Cup and first on the road.

Mike Bossy scored seven goals in the four games, tying Jean Béliveau's record from 1956, and won the Conn Smythe Trophy.

=== Game one ===
May 8	Vancouver Canucks	5–6	OT	New York Islanders	Nassau Coliseum	Recap

The Canucks had their best chance to win a game in the first one, as a Jim Nill short-handed marker gave them a 5–4 lead with only seven minutes to play in regulation time. However, the Islanders tied it when Mike Bossy banged home a loose puck after goaltender Richard Brodeur had collided with his own defenceman, Harold Snepsts, while trying to smother it. In the dying seconds of the first overtime period, Snepsts attempted to clear the puck up the middle, but it was intercepted by Bossy, who completed his hat trick with two seconds left on the clock to win the game for the Islanders.

Scoring summary
Period	Team	Goal	Assist(s)	Time	Score
1st	VAN	Thomas Gradin (7)	Lars Molin (6)	01:29	1–0 VAN
1st	NYI	Clark Gillies (7) – pp	Denis Potvin (10) and Bryan Trottier (18)	11:35	1–1
1st	NYI	Mike Bossy (11)	Clark Gillies (6) and Billy Carroll (2)	15:52	2–1 NYI
1st	VAN	Thomas Gradin (8) – pp	Curt Fraser (5) and Lars Molin (7)	17:40	2–2
1st	NYI	Denis Potvin (4) – pp	Butch Goring (4)	19:51	3–2 NYI
2nd	NYI	Denis Potvin (5) – pp	Bryan Trottier (19) and Stefan Persson (10)	03:15	4–2 NYI
2nd	VAN	Stan Smyl (8) – pp	Thomas Gradin (9) and Curt Fraser (6)	05:06	4–3 NYI
2nd	VAN	Ivan Boldirev (7)	Tiger Williams (5)	09:27	4–4
3rd	VAN	Jim Nill (4)	Gerry Minor (2) and Tiger Williams (6)	13:06	5–4 VAN
3rd	NYI	Mike Bossy (12)	John Tonelli (9) and Bryan Trottier (20)	15:14	5–5
OT	NYI	Mike Bossy (13)	Unassited	19:58	6–5 NYI
Penalty summary
Period	Team	Player	Penalty	Time	PIM
1st	VAN	Harold Snepsts	Holding	10:51	2:00
1st	NYI	Clark Gillies	Slashing	13:36	2:00
1st	NYI	Dave Langevin	Roughing	16:37	2:00
1st	VAN	Tiger Williams	Roughing	16:37	2:00
1st	NYI	Gord Lane	High-sticking	17:25	2:00
1st	VAN	Neil Belland	Interference	18:00	2:00
2nd	VAN	Anders Eldebrink	Holding	02:52	2:00
2nd	NYI	Gord Lane	Tripping	04:07	2:00
2nd	NYI	Bob Bourne	Fighting – major	10:19	5:00
2nd	NYI	Bob Bourne	Misconduct	10:19	10:00
2nd	NYI	Duane Sutter	Fighting – double major	10:19	10:00
2nd	NYI	Duane Sutter	Misconduct	10:19	10:00
2nd	VAN	Colin Campbell	Fighting – double major	10:19	10:00
2nd	VAN	Colin Campbell	Misconduct	10:19	10:00
2nd	VAN	Darcy Rota	Fighting – major	10:19	5:00
2nd	VAN	Darcy Rota	Misconduct	10:19	10:00
2nd	NYI	Bob Nystrom	Fighting – major	17:20	5:00
2nd	NYI	Bob Nystrom	Misconduct	17:20	10:00
2nd	VAN	Curt Fraser	Misconduct	17:20	10:00
2nd	VAN	Stan Smyl	Fighting – major	17:20	5:00
2nd	VAN	Stan Smyl	Misconduct	17:20	10:00
3rd	None				
OT	NYI	Bob Nystrom	Roughing	16:11	2:00
OT	VAN	Doug Halward	Roughing	16:11	2:00

Shots by period
Team	1	2	3	OT	Total
Vancouver	12	9	8	6	35
New York	12	6	12	6	36

=== Game two ===
May 8	Vancouver Canucks	4–6	New York Islanders	Nassau Coliseum	Recap

In game two, the Canucks led 4–3 after two periods, but the Islanders came back to win again.

Scoring summary
Period	Team	Goal	Assist(s)	Time	Score
1st	NYI	Billy Carroll (2) – sh	Bob Bourne (7)	15:55	1–0 NYI
2nd	VAN	Thomas Gradin (9) – pp	Lars Molin (8) and Curt Fraser (7)	08:28	1–1
2nd	VAN	Ivan Boldirev (8) – pp	Lars Molin (9) and Doug Halward (4)	13:12	2–1 VAN
2nd	NYI	Mike Bossy (14) – pp	Stefan Persson (11) and Denis Potvin (11)	17:06	2–2
2nd	VAN	Lars Lindgren (2)	Thomas Gradin (10)	19:42	3–2 VAN
3rd	NYI	Bob Bourne (9) – pp	Stefan Persson (12) and Mike Bossy (10)	00:32	3–3
3rd	NYI	Duane Sutter (5)	Brent Sutter (5) and Denis Potvin (12)	01:19	4–3 NYI
3rd	VAN	Gerry Minor (1)	Tiger Williams (7)	02:27	4–4
3rd	NYI	Bryan Trottier (6) – pp	Tomas Jonsson (2) and Denis Potvin (13)	07:18	5–4 NYI
3rd	NYI	Bob Nystrom (4)	John Tonelli (10) and Wayne Merrick (6)	07:18	6–4 NYI
Penalty summary
Period	Team	Player	Penalty	Time	PIM
1st	NYI	Bryan Trottier	Roughing	04:09	2:00
1st	VAN	Tiger Williams	Roughing	04:09	2:00
1st	NYI	Gord Lane	Cross-checking	05:16	2:00
1st	NYI	Denis Potvin	Tripping	08:46	2:00
1st	VAN	Ron Delorme	Cross-checking	11:27	2:00
1st	VAN	Lars Lindgren	Hooking	12:45	2:00
1st	NYI	Denis Potvin	Tripping	14:38	2:00
1st	VAN	Ivan Boldirev	Cross-checking	16:35	2:00
1st	NYI	Stefan Persson	Interference	18:48	2:00
1st	VAN	Curt Fraser	Hooking	19:05	2:00
2nd	NYI	Gord Lane	Slashing	06:02	2:00
2nd	VAN	Ron Delorme	Slashing	06:02	2:00
2nd	NYI	Bryan Trottier	Hooking	07:20	2:00
2nd	NYI	John Tonelli	High-sticking	10:03	2:00
2nd	NYI	John Tonelli	Interference	10:03	2:00
2nd	VAN	Colin Campbell	Slashing	10:03	2:00
2nd	VAN	Curt Fraser	Charging	16:03	2:00
2nd	NYI	Tomas Jonsson	Hooking	18:13	2:00
2nd	NYI	Bryan Trottier	Roughing	18:49	2:00
2nd	NYI	Gord Lane	Misconduct	18:49	10:00
2nd	VAN	Gord Lane	Roughing	18:49	2:00
2nd	VAN	Curt Fraser	Misconduct	18:49	10:00
2nd	VAN	Stan Smyl	Roughing	19:05	2:00
3rd	NYI	Bob Nystrom	Cross-checking	03:43	2:00
3rd	NYI	Billy Smith	Slashing	04:37	2:00
3rd	VAN	Tiger Williams	Roughing	04:37	2:00
3rd	VAN	Tiger Williams	Slashing	04:37	2:00
3rd	NYI	Duane Sutter	Misconduct	08:15	10:00
3rd	VAN	Harold Snepsts	Misconduct	08:15	10:00
3rd	NYI	Clark Gillies	Roughing	11:17	2:00
3rd	NYI	Billy Smith	Slashing	11:35	2:00
3rd	VAN	Tiger Williams	Interference	11:35	2:00

Shots by period
Team	1	2	3	Total
Vancouver	6	14	10	30
New York	15	9	12	36

=== Game three ===
May 13	New York Islanders	3–0	Vancouver Canucks	Pacific Coliseum	Recap

The series then shifted to Vancouver, where the Canucks were boosted by a boisterous, towel-waving Vancouver crowd and had a great first period, but failed to score on Billy Smith, who was brilliant, making 23 saves for his first shutout of the postseason.

Scoring summary
Period	Team	Goal	Assist(s)	Time	Score
1st	None				
2nd	NYI	Clark Gillies (8)	Brent Sutter (6)	02:56	1–0 NYI
2nd	NYI	Mike Bossy (15)	Stefan Persson (13) and Bryan Trottier (21)	12:30	2–0 NYI
3rd	NYI	Bob Nystrom (5) – en	Butch Goring (5) and Denis Potvin (14)	18:40	3–0 NYI
Penalty summary
Period	Team	Player	Penalty	Time	PIM
1st	NYI	Clark Gillies	High-sticking	01:06	2:00
1st	VAN	Tiger Williams	High-sticking	01:06	2:00
1st	NYI	Butch Goring	Unsportsmanlike conduct	08:41	2:00
1st	VAN	Thomas Gradin	Holding	09:00	2:00
1st	NYI	Gord Lane	Hooking	13:03	2:00
1st	NYI	Billy Carroll	Holding	14:03	2:00
1st	VAN	Colin Campbell	Holding	17:37	2:00
2nd	NYI	Bryan Trottier	Slashing	06:48	2:00
2nd	VAN	Tiger Williams	Slashing	06:48	2:00
2nd	VAN	Doug Halward	Holding	10:29	2:00
2nd	NYI	Ken Morrow	Interference	12:41	2:00
3rd	NYI	Bob Bourne	Roughing	00:12	2:00
3rd	VAN	Jim Nill	High-sticking	00:12	2:00
3rd	VAN	Jim Nill	Roughing	00:12	2:00
3rd	NYI	Duane Sutter	Roughing	04:06	2:00
3rd	VAN	Harold Snepsts	Roughing	04:06	2:00

Shots by period
Team	1	2	3	Total
New York	9	18	5	32
Vancouver	8	8	7	23

=== Game four ===
May 16	New York Islanders	3–1	Vancouver Canucks	Pacific Coliseum	Recap

The Islanders went on to win 3–0, and then completed the sweep with a 3–1 victory on May 16 to win their third straight Cup and first on the road. Mike Bossy scored seven goals in the four games, tying Jean Beliveau's record from 1956, and won the Conn Smythe Trophy.

Scoring summary
Period	Team	Goal	Assist(s)	Time	Score
1st	NYI	Butch Goring (6)	Denis Potvin (15)	11:38	1–0 NYI
1st	VAN	Stan Smyl (9)	Gerry Minor (3) and Colin Campbell (2)	18:09	1–1
2nd	NYI	Mike Bossy (16) – pp	Denis Potvin (16) and Bryan Trottier (22)	05:00	2–1 NYI
2nd	NYI	Mike Bossy (17) – pp	Bryan Trottier (23) and Stefan Persson (14)	08:00	3–1 NYI
3rd	None				
Penalty summary
Period	Team	Player	Penalty	Time	PIM
1st	VAN	Colin Campbell	Hooking	02:29	2:00
1st	NYI	Clark Gillies	Hooking	05:53	2:00
1st	NYI	Bryan Trottier	Holding	08:25	2:00
1st	VAN	Curt Fraser	Hooking	09:31	2:00
1st	NYI	Gord Lane	Slashing	13:03	2:00
1st	VAN	Jim Nill	Slashing	13:03	2:00
1st	VAN	Darcy Rota	Roughing	15:40	2:00
1st	NYI	Bob Nystrom	Boarding	16:53	2:00
1st	VAN	Harold Snepsts	Elbowing	16:53	2:00
2nd	NYI	Stefan Persson	Holding	02:29	2:00
2nd	VAN	Darcy Rota	Cross-checking	03:02	2:00
2nd	VAN	Stan Smyl	High-sticking	06:08	2:00
2nd	VAN	Neil Belland	Tripping	14:53	2:00
3rd	None				

Shots by period
Team	1	2	3	Total
New York	9	12	7	28
Vancouver	10	5	9	24

== Broadcasting ==
The series aired on CBC in Canada and on the USA Network in the United States. However, USA's national coverage was blacked out in the New York area due to the local rights to Islanders games in that TV market, with SportsChannel New York airing games one and two, and WOR televising games three and four.

=== Technical Difficulties ===
During the first period of the fourth game, WOR's broadcast experienced technical difficulties due to videotaping and editing issues causing an estimated 4 minutes and 30 seconds delay on their broadcast. The station placed a still of its station identification card with a text-insert reading "Please Stand By" on the center of the screen. After a minute of silence, music by Alan Hawkshaw began playing with a station announcer announcing "Please stand by, we're experiencing technical difficulties. As soon as they have been corrected, we shall return to our scheduled programs". This occurred before a commercial break.

== Team rosters ==
=== New York Islanders ===
No.	Nat	Player	Pos	S/G	Age	Acquired	Birthplace
1	(Canada)	Roland Melanson	G	L	21	1979	Moncton, New Brunswick
2	(Canada)	Mike McEwen	D	L	25	1981	Hornepayne, Ontario
5	(Canada)	Denis Potvin (C)	D	L	28	1973	Vanier, Ontario
6	(United States)	Ken Morrow	D	R	25	1976	Davison, Michigan
7	(Sweden)	Stefan Persson	D	L	27	1974	Bjurholm, Sweden
9	(Canada)	Clark Gillies	LW	L	28	1974	Moose Jaw, Saskatchewan
11	(Canada)	Wayne Merrick	C	L	30	1977	Sarnia, Ontario
12	(Canada)	Duane Sutter	RW	R	22	1979	Viking, Alberta
14	(Canada)	Bob Bourne	LW	L	27	1974	Kindersley, Saskatchewan
17	(Canada)	Greg Gilbert	LW	L	20	1980	Mississauga, Ontario
19	(Canada)	Bryan Trottier	C	L	25	1974	Val Marie, Saskatchewan
21	(Canada)	Brent Sutter	C	R	19	1980	Viking, Alberta
22	(Canada)	Mike Bossy	RW	R	25	1977	Montreal, Quebec
23	(Sweden)	Bob Nystrom	RW	R	29	1972	Stockholm, Sweden
24	(Canada)	Gord Lane	D	L	29	1979	Brandon, Manitoba
25	(Canada)	Billy Carroll	C	L	23	1979	Toronto, Ontario
26	(United States)	Dave Langevin	D	L	27	1974	Saint Paul, Minnesota
27	(Canada)	John Tonelli	LW	L	25	1977	Hamilton, Ontario
28	(Sweden)	Anders Kallur	RW	L	29	1979	Ludvika, Sweden
29	(Canada)	Hector Marini	RW	R	25	1977	Timmins, Ontario
31	(Canada)	Billy Smith	G	L	31	1972	Perth, Ontario
91	(Canada)	Butch Goring	C	L	32	1980	St. Boniface, Manitoba

=== Vancouver Canucks ===
No.	Nat	Player	Pos	S/G	Age	Acquired	Birthplace
2	(Canada)	Doug Halward	D	L	26	1981	Toronto, Ontario
3	(Canada)	Garth Butcher	D	R	19	1981	Regina, Saskatchewan
5	(Canada)	Colin Campbell	D	L	29	1980	London, Ontario
6	(Canada)	Andy Schliebener	D	L	19	1980	Ottawa, Ontario
7	(Canada)	Gary Lupul	C	L	23	1979	Powell River, British Columbia
8	(Canada)	Jim Nill	RW	R	24	1982	Hanna, Alberta
9	(Canada)	Ivan Boldirev	C	L	32	1980	Zrenjanin, Yugoslavia
10	(Sweden)	Anders Eldebrink	D	R	21	1981	Morjärv, Sweden
12	(Canada)	Stan Smyl	RW	R	24	1978	Glendon, Alberta
13	(Sweden)	Lars Lindgren	D	L	29	1978	Piteå, Sweden
14	(Canada)	Blair MacDonald	RW	R	28	1981	Cornwall, Ontario
15	(Canada)	Neil Belland	D	L	21	1981	Parry Sound, Ontario
16	(Sweden)	Per-Olov Brasar	LW	L	31	1979	Falun, Sweden
17	(Canada)	Tony Currie	RW	R	24	1982	Sydney Mines, Nova Scotia
18	(Canada)	Darcy Rota	LW	L	29	1980	Vancouver, British Columbia
19	(Canada)	Ron Delorme	RW	R	26	1981	North Battleford, Saskatchewan
20	(Canada)	Gerry Minor	C	L	23	1978	Regina, Saskatchewan
21	(Czechoslovakia)	Ivan Hlinka	C	L	32	1981	Most, Czechoslovakia
22	(Canada)	Tiger Williams	LW	L	28	1980	Weyburn, Saskatchewan
23	(Sweden)	Thomas Gradin	C	L	26	1980	Sollefteå, Sweden
24	(United States)	Curt Fraser	LW	L	24	1978	Cincinnati, Ohio
25	(Canada)	Kevin McCarthy (C)	D	R	24	1979	Winnipeg, Manitoba
26	(Sweden)	Lars Molin	LW	L	26	1981	Örnsköldsvik, Sweden
27	(Canada)	Harold Snepsts	D	L	27	1974	Edmonton, Alberta
28	(Canada)	Marc Crawford	LW	L	21	1980	Belleville, Ontario
31	(Canada)	Rick Heinz	G	L	26	1982	Essex, Ontario
35	(Canada)	Richard Brodeur	G	L	29	1980	Longueuil, Quebec

Note: Stan Smyl served as the Canucks acting team captain during the 1982 Stanley Cup playoffs. Kevin McCarthy was injured late in the season and did not play in the playoffs and is listed as the official team captain.

== Stanley Cup engraving ==
The 1982 Stanley Cup was presented to Islanders captain Denis Potvin by NHL President John Ziegler following the Islanders 3–1 win over the Canucks in game four.

The following Islanders players and staff had their names engraved on the Stanley Cup.

1981–82 New York Islanders

=== Players ===
Centres

- 14 Bob Bourne
- 19 Bryan Trottier
- 21 Brent Sutter
- 25 Billy Carroll*
- 91 Butch Goring

Wingers

- 9 Clark Gillies
- 11 Wayne Merrick
- 12 Duane Sutter
- 17 Greg Gilbert †
- 22 Mike Bossy
- 23 Bob Nystrom
- 27 John Tonelli
- 28 Anders Kallur
- 29 Hector Marini †

Defencemen

- 5 Denis Potvin (Captain)
- 2 Mike McEwen
- 3 Tomas Jonsson
- 6 Ken Morrow
- 7 Stefan Persson
- 24 Gord Lane
- 26 Dave Langevin

Goaltenders

- 1 Roland Melanson
- 31 Billy Smith
- * Played both centre and wing.
- † Did not play in the Final. Name engraved on Stanley Cup despite not officially qualifying.^{[A]}

=== Coaching and administrative staff ===
- John Pickett (Chairman/Owner)
- Bill Torrey (President/General Manager)
- Jim Devellano (Asst. General Manager/Director of Scouting)
- Al Arbour (Head Coach), Lorne Henning (Asst. Coach)
- Gerry Ehman (Head Scout)
- Ron Waske (Trainer), Jim Pickard (Asst. Trainer)

=== Stanley Cup engraving ===
- ^{^[A]} Two players who did not play in the Final did not officially qualify, but still had their names engraved on the Stanley Cup.
  - #17 Greg Gilbert (LW) – played 1 regular season and 4 playoff games
  - #29 Hector Marini (RW) – played 30 regular season games and 0 playoff games
- Harry Boyd, Mario Saraceno (Scouts) were included on the Stanley Cup in 1980, 1981. They were still part of the 1982, 1983 New York Islanders, but names were not put on the cup those years.

== Aftermath ==
The Islanders successfully returned to the Final the following year. This time, they played the Edmonton Oilers and swept them to capture their fourth consecutive Stanley Cup championship.

The Canucks, however, lost in the first round to the Calgary Flames, 3–1. The Canucks would not return to the Stanley Cup Final until 1994, when they were defeated by the Islanders’ crosstown rivals, the New York Rangers, in seven games. The Canucks would also return to the Cup Final in 2011, but they lost to the Boston Bruins, also in seven games after blowing a two games to none series lead. Both of these Cup Final losses would result in riots, with the most famous one being the latter.

== See also ==
- List of Stanley Cup champions
- 1981–82 NHL season

== Notes ==
Preceded by New York Islanders; 1981	New York Islanders; Stanley Cup champions 1982	Succeeded by New York Islanders; 1983
