= Stan Smyl =

Canadian ice hockey player

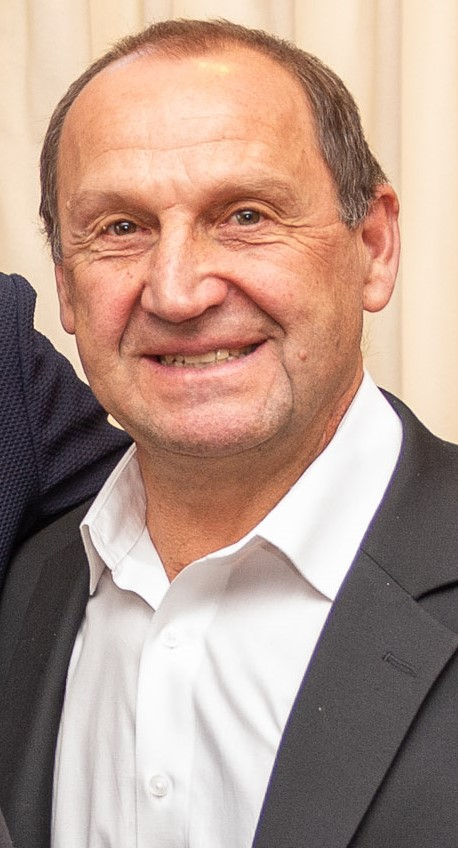
- Smyl in 2019
- Born: January 28, 1958 (age 68) Glendon, Alberta, Canada
- Height: 5 ft 8 in (173 cm)
- Weight: 185 lb (84 kg; 13 st 3 lb)
- Position: Right wing
- Shot: Right
- Played for: Vancouver Canucks
- National team: Canada
- NHL draft: 40th overall, 1978; Vancouver Canucks
- Playing career: 1978–1991
Medal record
Representing Canada
Ice hockey
World Championships
Silver medal – second place	1985 Czechoslovakia
World Junior Championships
Bronze medal – third place	1978 Canada

Stanley Philip Smyl (born January 28, 1958) is a Canadian professional ice hockey executive and former player. He was selected 40th overall by the Vancouver Canucks in the 1978 NHL Amateur Draft and went on to play his entire NHL career with the team until his retirement in 1991. He featured in the 1982 Stanley Cup Final with the Canucks.

Smyl was born in Glendon, Alberta, but grew up in nearby St. Paul, Alberta. As a junior, he appeared in three consecutive Memorial Cups with the New Westminster Bruins, winning the championship in 1977 and 1978.

Nicknamed "Steamer" by the Bellingham Blazer fans for his relentless and hard-nosed style of play, he served as captain for a team record eight seasons, later tied by Henrik Sedin. He retired as the Canucks' all-time leader in games played, goals, assists and points – all of which have been since surpassed by Henrik and Daniel Sedin. Smyl's number 12 was the first retired number in Canucks' history, as it was raised to the Pacific Coliseum rafters in 1991. It now hangs with Pavel Bure's number 10, Trevor Linden's number 16, Markus Näslund's number 19, Daniel Sedin's number 22, and Henrik Sedin's number 33 at Rogers Arena.

The end of his playing career coincided with the beginning of a 13-year coaching career, serving as an assistant with the Canucks and a head coach with the club's minor league affiliates: the Syracuse Crunch, Kansas City Blades and Manitoba Moose. Upon being let go as coach of the Moose, he was reassigned to the Canucks' front office where he has served as director of player development and director of collegiate scouting, before being appointed role as senior advisor on hockey operations. In December 2021, Smyl briefly served as interim general manager of the Canucks after general manager Jim Benning was relieved of his duties.

== Playing career ==
=== Junior career (1974–78) ===
Smyl played Junior A with the Bellingham Blazers of the British Columbia Junior Hockey League (BCJHL) for one season in 1974–75. Notching 33 points in 25 playoff games, he led the Blazers to a Fred Page Cup title as league champions in a 4–2 win over the Kelowna Buckaroos. Advancing to a best-of-seven series with the Alberta Junior Hockey League (AJHL) champions for a berth in the 1975 Royal Bank Cup, the Blazers lost the Pacific regional title to the Spruce Grove Mets.

Following his playoffs with the Blazers, Smyl debuted at the major junior level with the New Westminster Bruins of the Western Canada Hockey League (WCHL). He appeared in three playoff games, being a part of the Bruins franchise's first President's Cup as WCHL champions. Joining the Bruins full-time the following season, Smyl put up 74 points in 72 games as the Bruins captured their second consecutive WCHL title. Earning a berth in the 1976 Memorial Cup, they lost the Canadian major junior title to the Hamilton Fincups.

In 1976–77, New Westminster repeated as President's Cup champions as Smyl posted 66 points in the regular season, then 13 points in 13 playoff games. Returning to the Memorial Cup, the Bruins won their first major junior title in franchise history. Playing in his third and final major junior season, Smyl recorded a WCJHL career high 76 points over 53 games. In the 1978 WCHL playoffs, he notched 35 points in 20 games, capturing his third consecutive President's Cup with the Bruins. At the 1978 Memorial Cup, Smyl was named the tournament MVP and received tournament All-Star Team honours with 14 points in five games. The Bruins became the first team to repeat as Memorial Cup champions in consecutive years as the Bruins won for the second straight year.

=== Vancouver Canucks ===
==== Draft to Stanley Cup run (1978–82) ====
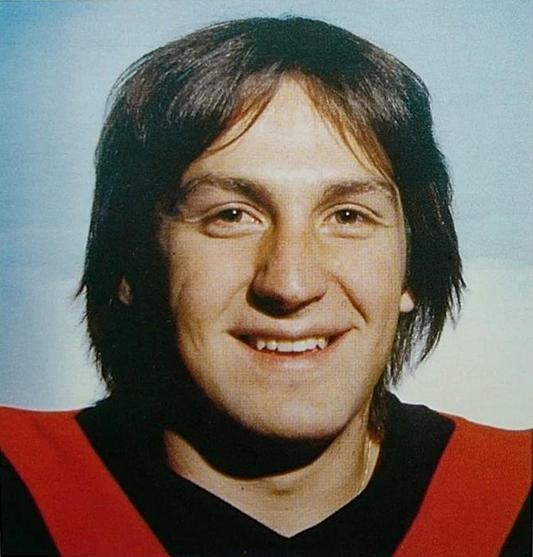
1978-79 card of Stan Smyl for Vancouver Canucks

After a decorated season with the New Westminster Bruins, his final year of junior, Smyl was a third round, 40th overall selection in the 1978 NHL Amateur Draft by the Vancouver Canucks. Smyl entered the NHL with the Canucks the following season in 1978–79. Playing on a line with fellow rookies Thomas Gradin and Curt Fraser, he scored 14 goals and 38 points over 62 games in his first season. He also proved to be physical, earning 89 penalty minutes as well. As the Canucks qualified for the 1979 playoffs as the final seed, Smyl scored his first NHL post-season goal in game one of the preliminary round against the Philadelphia Flyers. Vancouver won the game 3–2, but went on to lose the best-of-three series in three games. Smyl also played three games for the Central Hockey League's Dallas Black Hawks during the campaign.

Smyl became a point-per-game player in his second NHL season, leading the Canucks in scoring with 31 goals and 78 points over 77 games in 1979–80. In the second half of the season, he registered a team record point-scoring streak that lasted 12 games (five goals and 22 points) between February 7 and March 4, 1980. The streak broke Dennis Kearns' 11-game mark, set three years prior in March 1977. Shortly after the streak ended, he notched his first NHL career hat trick against the goaltender Pat Riggin during a game against the Atlanta Flames on March 7. Nearly a month later, he notched four assists in one game – a 5–0 win against the Edmonton Oilers on April 1, 1980.

The following campaign, Smyl was involved in an on-ice incident during a game against the Pittsburgh Penguins on March 17, 1981. During the first period, opposing forward Gary Rissling speared him in the face. Joined by several teammates, Smyl began fighting Rissling. Consequently, Smyl and Rissling both received minor penalties for roughing and major penalties for fighting, while additionally being ejected from the game. A week later, Rissling received a four-game suspension from NHL executive vice president Brian O'Neill. Smyl was not injured on the play and appeared in all 80 games for the Canucks in 1980–81, notching 25 goals and 63 points.

Early in the 1981–82 season, Smyl recorded a five-point game, notching a hat trick and two assists, in an 8–4 win against the Philadelphia Flyers on October 31, 1981. Late in the campaign, he was named team captain, succeeding defenceman Kevin McCarthy, who had broken his ankle during practice. He went on to complete the campaign with 34 goals and 78 points over 80 games.

Despite finishing the regular season with a losing record, the Canucks embarked on a playoff run to the franchise's first Stanley Cup Final in team history. In the fifth and deciding game of the semi-finals against the Chicago Black Hawks, Smyl notched two goals in a 6–2 win to capture the Clarence S. Campbell Bowl as conference champions, sending the Canucks to the Finals. Facing the New York Islanders, who had finished the regular season 41 points ahead of the Canucks and had won the Stanley Cup the previous two years, they were swept in four games. Smyl scored the Canucks' only goal in their 3–1 defeat in game four, tying the game at 1–1 in the first period on his own rebound before Mike Bossy scored twice to secure the Islanders' win. Smyl accumulated 19 points in 18 playoff games, second in team scoring to Thomas Gradin.

==== Captaincy and retirement (1982–91) ====
During the subsequent off-season, Canucks general manager Harry Neale appointed Smyl as McCarthy's permanent successor as team captain. The decision was influenced by the Canucks' run to the Finals under Smyl's captaincy. Neale commented, "We reached a tremendous high last spring under Stan as captain and we feel we want to continue that atmosphere." Consequently, McCarthy asked to be traded, but remained with the team for one-and-a-half seasons thereafter until he was dealt to the Pittsburgh Penguins in January 1984.

In his first full season as captain, Smyl recorded career highs with 38 goals and 50 assists. In addition to leading the club in scoring for the second time in his career, his 88 points established a club record (it was broken by Patrik Sundström's 91 points the following season). Late in the campaign, he recorded the most prolific month by a Canucks player in team history with 31 points (10 goals and 21 assists) over 16 games in March 1983. During that span, he reeled off a 13-game point streak from February 27 to March 23 that included eight goals and 27 points. At 13 games, the streak surpassed the previous team record he set in 1980, but was quickly broken by teammate Darcy Rota six days later with a 14-game scoring streak of his own. Smyl, Rota and Gradin formed a high-scoring top line for Vancouver; all three teammates finished among the league's top 30 players in points. Entering the 1983 playoffs, the Canucks attempted to defend their Clarence S. Campbell Bowl of the previous season, but were defeated in four games of a best-of-five series against the Calgary Flames. Smyl helped the Canucks stave off elimination in game three, scoring the game winning goal with 57 seconds to go in regulation, but they were defeated the following game.

The following season in 1983–84, Smyl's production dipped to 67 points. Vancouver met the Flames in the first round of the playoffs for the second consecutive year, losing in four games once more. Smyl and the Canucks would not qualify for the playoffs again for five years. He remained in the 60-point range in the 1984–85 and 1985–86 seasons. On February 27, 1985, Smyl scored his 187th career goal to pass Don Lever as the Canucks' all-time leading goal-scorer.

Late in the 1985–86 season, Smyl suffered torn knee ligaments due to a blindsiding check from opposing forward Alain Côté during the final minute of a 7–6 win against the Quebec Nordiques on March 26, 1987. He was sidelined for the remainder of the campaign. In the off-season, Smyl was re-signed by the Canucks to a multi-year contract in July 1986.

The following season, the Canucks met the Nordiques in a game on October 13, 1986. Smyl fought Côté during the game, but he was consequently sidelined by re-injuring his knee. Upon returning to the lineup, Smyl was involved in an altercation with Montreal Canadiens forward Stéphane Richer that led to a bench-clearing brawl during a game on November 2. After spearing Richer late in the third period, Canadiens forward Claude Lemieux then sucker-punched Smyl in the head on his way to the bench. A total of 139 penalty minutes were assessed to both teams and the Canadiens went on to win the game five–3.

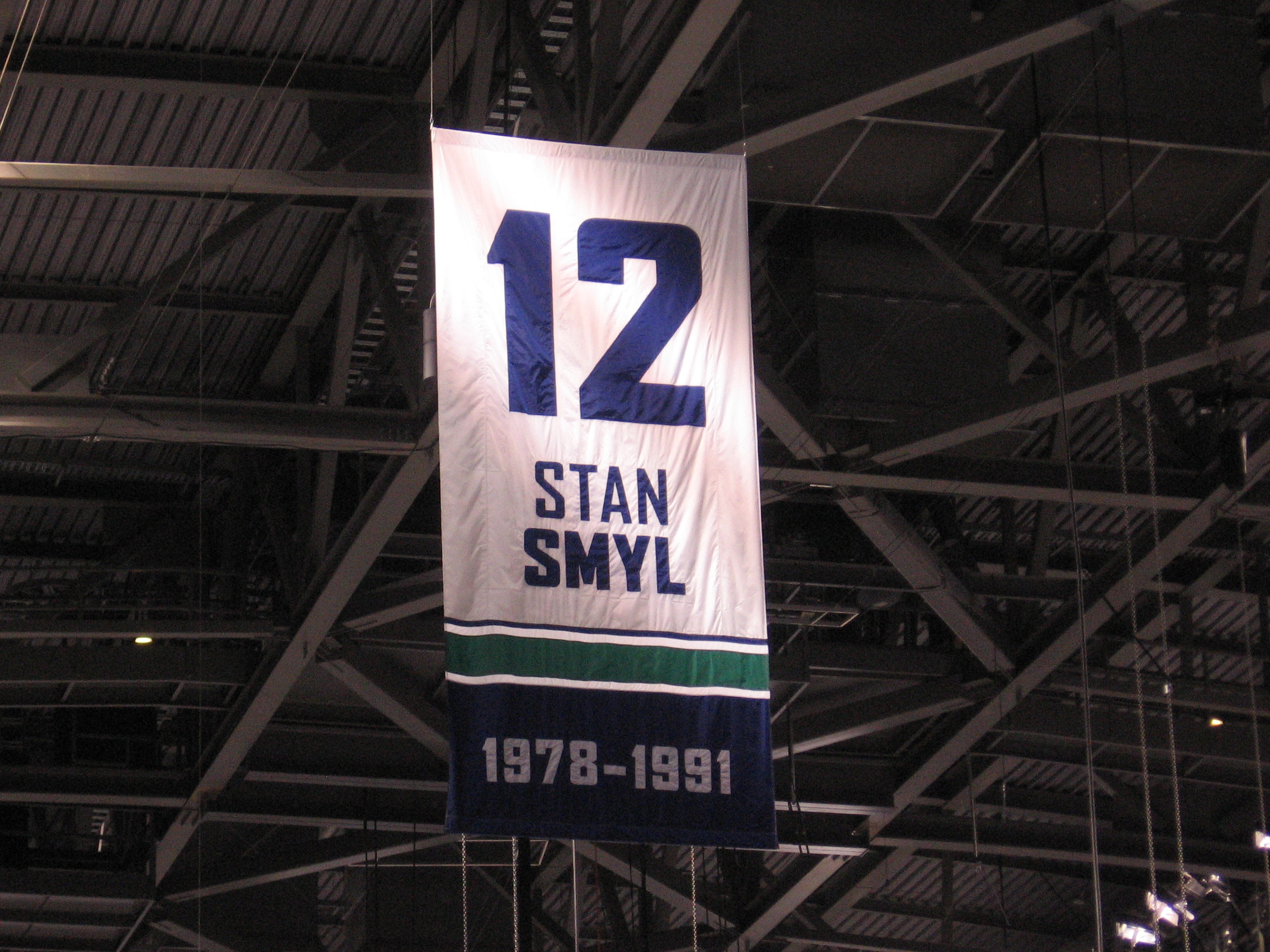
Smyl's retired #12 banner at Rogers Arena

Later in the season, Smyl became the Canucks' all-time leader in regular season games played with 648, passing Harold Snepsts in a game against the Philadelphia Flyers on November 5, 1985. The following month, Smyl became the Canucks all-time points leader on December 14, 1986. Notching his sixth career hat trick against the Chicago Blackhawks, he recorded his 551st career point to pass Thomas Gradin's all-time leading mark of 550. A little over a month later, Smyl was awarded the first and only penalty shot of his NHL career during a game against the Calgary Flames on January 16, 1987. Facing goaltender Mike Vernon, he scored to help the Canucks win 9–5. There was speculation at the trade deadline in March 1987 that Smyl would be traded to a playoff contender, as the Canucks were in the midst of another losing season. Smyl responded by asserting that Vancouver was his home and he had no desire to be dealt away. He finished the campaign with 20 goals and 43 points over 66 games in an injury-shortened season. It marked the lowest points total of his career and the start of a decrease in production in the remaining four seasons before his retirement.

After recording eight consecutive 20-plus goal seasons, Smyl's production dipped to 12 goals and 37 points over 57 games in 1987–88. Injured during the season, Smyl was temporarily replaced by defenceman Daryl Stanley as team captain in his absence. The following year, Smyl appeared in his last playoffs with the Canucks, as well as his first in five years. The Canucks took the Presidents' Trophy winner Calgary Flames to seven games in the first round, but lost the deciding game in overtime. Smyl had an opportunity to win the series for Vancouver on a breakaway in overtime, but was stopped by a Mike Vernon glove save. Smyl was held without a point in the series.

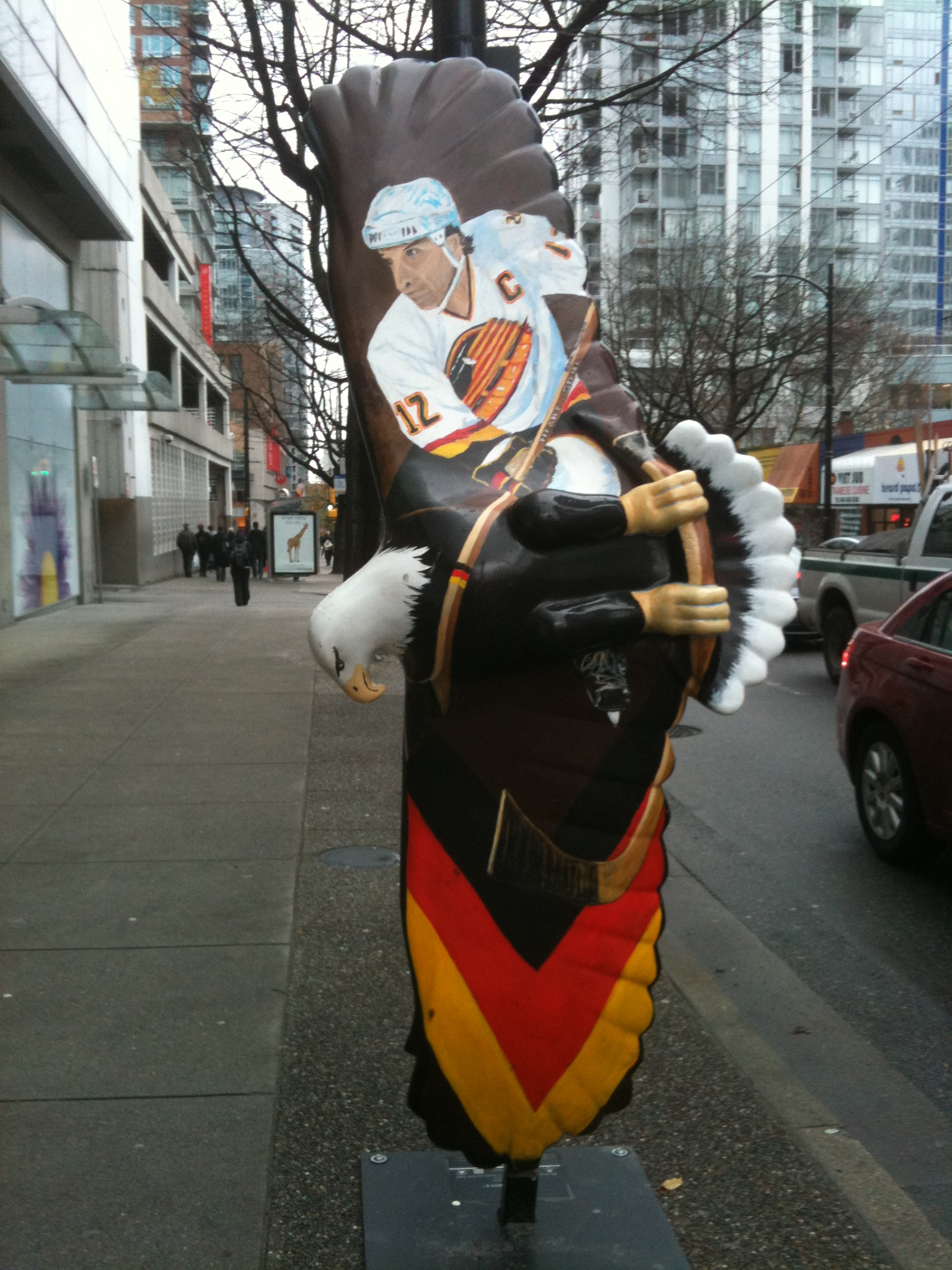
An eagle statue dedicated to Smyl in Downtown Vancouver.

In 1989–90, Smyl played his last season as team captain and recorded 16 points in 47 games. He was often a healthy scratch (non-dressing player) and did not score his first goal of the season until the final game on March 31, 1990, a 6–3 win against the Los Angeles Kings (he had not previously scored since April 2, 1989 – the final game of the previous season). At the start of the next season, Smyl resigned his captaincy and it was split throughout the season between Dan Quinn, Doug Lidster and Trevor Linden (the captaincy would be retained by Linden). Smyl had held the position for eight years, the longest tenure among Canucks captains all-time. He scored his last NHL goal on December 5, 1990, against the New Jersey Devils. He played his last game on March 16, 1991, against the New York Islanders. After managing 14 points in 45 games, Smyl retired at the end of the 1990–91 season.

== Legacy and honours ==
Smyl retired with Canucks franchise records in every major statistical category with 262 goals, 411 assists and 673 points in 896 games played. He became the first Canucks player to have his jersey number retired as his #12 was raised to the rafters at the Pacific Coliseum on November 3, 1991. In 2000, he was inducted into the British Columbia Hockey Hall of Fame.

Smyl's all-time team records stood for more than a decade until Trevor Linden (who was part of the Canucks tri-captaincy after Smyl resigned the captaincy) overtook them, beginning with his goals mark in 2002–03. The following season in 2003–04, Linden played in his 897th game and recorded his 674th point as a Canuck to surpass Smyl on both marks. Smyl's last major mark of assists was passed by Linden on November 8, 2007, and then surpassed by Henrik Sedin in the 2009–10 season. Later Canucks captain Markus Näslund would, in turn, surpass Linden's marks in goals and points, but not games. Smyl was later present as Linden's retirement ceremony as he joined Smyl as the only two players to have their jersey numbers retired by the Canucks. Näslund joined them in that honour during the 2010–11 season.

At the 2010 Winter Olympics, held in Vancouver, Smyl was named the official ambassador for Molson Canadian Hockey House – a pavilion for hockey fans and players that was temporarily raised in Downtown Vancouver. He also ran a leg with the Olympic torch on the last day of the relay on February 12, 2010.

== International play ==
During his final year of junior, Smyl was selected to the Canadian national junior team for the 1978 World Junior Championships, held in Québec, Canada. Playing as the host nation, Canada earned the bronze medal, having finished third in round-robin play. Smyl notched a goal and an assist over six games.

Smyl got his first and only opportunity to represent Canada's men's team in 1985. After the Canucks became the first team eliminated from contention for the 1985 Stanley Cup playoffs, Hockey Canada selected Smyl and four other Canucks – Doug Halward, Doug Lidster, Tony Tanti and Cam Neely – to the national team for the 1985 World Championships in Prague, Czechoslovakia. Facing the Soviet Union in the second game of the final round, Smyl scored the game winner, his only goal of the tournament, for Canada in a 3–1 victory. The win placed Canada in contention for their first gold medal at the World Championships in 24 years. However, they lost the gold medal to Czechoslovakia in a 5–3 loss. Smyl contributed two points in 10 games while playing on a line with Brian MacLellan and Bernie Nicholls.

== Playing style ==
Smyl was relatively small for an NHL player at 5 feet and 8 inches. He was known for his two-way play, being responsible on defence, while also producing offensively. He compensated for his size with toughness and relentless checking that made him a fan favourite and earned him the nickname "Steamer". Smyl was also a strong leader, serving as captain for the Canucks for eight seasons.

== Coaching and front office career ==
=== Assistant with Vancouver ===
When Smyl announced his retirement on July 3, 1991, he was concurrently named a Canucks assistant coach, along with Rick Ley, to Pat Quinn. He was honoured for his playing career, spent entirely with the Canucks, during a pre-game ceremony on November 3. In his third year behind the bench, Smyl was involved in his second Stanley Cup Final with the Canucks in 1994. Vancouver went to seven games with the New York Rangers, losing 3–2 in the deciding game. Smyl helped coach opposite Rangers assistant coach Colin Campbell, who was also a part of the Canucks' 1982 Cup run as a player.

Between 1994 and 1999, the Canucks' head coaching position changed five times. Ley overtook head coaching duties from 1994 to 1996 as Quinn returned to his executive positions as president and general manager. After Ley was fired late in the 1995–96 season, Quinn served as the Canucks' interim head coach until Tom Renney was hired for the beginning of the 1996–97 season. In turn, Renney was fired after one-and-a-half seasons and replaced by Mike Keenan. Throughout the changes, Smyl remained in his position as assistant under all four head coaches.

=== Minor league head coach ===
In June 1999, Smyl was named head coach of the Canucks' American Hockey League (AHL) affiliate, the Syracuse Crunch. He became the second coach in Crunch history, replacing Jack McIlhargey, who had served for five seasons. He coached the Crunch to a .500 season in his debut behind the bench. In the 2000 off-season, the Canucks signed a two-year affiliation agreement with the Kansas City Blades of the International Hockey League (IHL). Smyl was reassigned to Kansas City, replacing their previous coach Paul MacLean.

When the IHL folded following Smyl's first season with the Blades, he was moved back to the AHL, named coach of the Manitoba Moose on June 28, 2001. He coached them to the second round in 2002–03. On March 2, 2004, he notched his 100th win as head coach of the Moose in a 3–0 win over the Milwaukee Admirals. However, as the Moose missed the playoffs for the first time in seven years in 2004, Smyl was dismissed as head coach on June 7, 2004, and reassigned within the Canucks organization. He was replaced by Washington Capitals assistant coach Randy Carlyle. Some Moose players later commented that Carlyle exhibited a stronger presence and was more demanding in comparison to Smyl.

=== Canucks front office ===
Let go as Moose head coach, Smyl was named the Canucks' Director of Player Development in the 2004 off-season. Much of his time was spent overseeing the play of prospects within the Canucks' farm system – for example those playing with the Manitoba Moose of the AHL and Victoria Salmon Kings of the ECHL. He served in that capacity for four years until Mike Gillis took over as Canucks general manager from Dave Nonis after the 2007–08 season. Gillis expanded the Canucks' player development and scouting departments and assigned Smyl the newly created position as Director of Collegiate Scouting. Former NHL player Dave Gagner assumed Smyl's former Director of Player Development role. After one season in that role, Smyl was re-positioned to a role as Senior Advisor to Gillis before the 2008–09 season on September 11, 2008. In his duties as Advisor he still partially oversees collegiate scouting.

On December 5–9, 2021, Smyl briefly served as interim general manager of the Canucks after the firing of Jim Benning.

On October 5, 2023, Smyl announced he was stepping away from his Hockey Operations position after 45 years but is remaining with the club as a community and business ambassador.

== Personal life ==
Smyl left home at 13 years old to pursue his hockey career in British Columbia. His wife was Jennifer Smyl, who died in September 2022.

== Career statistics ==
=== Regular season and playoffs ===
			Regular season					Playoffs
Season	Team	League	GP	G	A	Pts	PIM	GP	G	A	Pts	PIM
1974–75	Bellingham Blazers	BCHL	48	29	33	62	115	25	13	22	35	15
1974–75	New Westminster Bruins	WCHL	—	—	—	—	—	3	0	0	0	15
1975–76	New Westminster Bruins	WCHL	72	32	42	74	169	19	8	6	14	58
1975–76	New Westminster Bruins	MC	—	—	—	—	—	4	5	1	6	21
1976–77	New Westminster Bruins	WCHL	72	35	31	66	200	13	6	7	13	51
1976–77	New Westminster Bruins	MC	—	—	—	—	—	3	0	0	0	6
1977–78	New Westminster Bruins	WCHL	53	29	47	76	211	20	14	21	35	43
1977–78	New Westminster Bruins	MC	—	—	—	—	—	5	4	10	14	0
1978–79	Vancouver Canucks	NHL	62	14	24	38	89	2	1	1	2	0
1978–79	Dallas Black Hawks	CHL	3	1	1	2	9	—	—	—	—	—
1979–80	Vancouver Canucks	NHL	77	31	47	78	204	4	0	2	2	14
1980–81	Vancouver Canucks	NHL	80	25	38	63	171	3	1	2	3	0
1981–82	Vancouver Canucks	NHL	80	34	44	78	144	17	9	9	18	25
1982–83	Vancouver Canucks	NHL	74	38	50	88	114	4	3	2	5	12
1983–84	Vancouver Canucks	NHL	80	24	43	67	136	4	2	1	3	4
1984–85	Vancouver Canucks	NHL	80	27	37	64	100	—	—	—	—	—
1985–86	Vancouver Canucks	NHL	73	27	35	62	144	—	—	—	—	—
1986–87	Vancouver Canucks	NHL	66	20	23	43	84	—	—	—	—	—
1987–88	Vancouver Canucks	NHL	57	12	25	37	110	—	—	—	—	—
1988–89	Vancouver Canucks	NHL	75	7	18	25	102	7	0	0	0	9
1989–90	Vancouver Canucks	NHL	47	1	15	16	71	—	—	—	—	—
1990–91	Vancouver Canucks	NHL	45	2	12	14	87	—	—	—	—	—
NHL totals			896	262	411	673	1,556	41	16	17	33	64

=== International ===
Year	Team	Event	GP	G	A	Pts	PIM
1978	Canada	WJC	6	1	1	2	6
1985	Canada	WC	10	1	1	2	6

== Awards ==
=== Junior ===
Award	Year
Fred Page Cup (BCJHL title, Bellingham Blazers)	1975
President's Cup (WCHL title, New Westminster Bruins)	1975, 1976, 1977, 1978
Memorial Cup (Canadian major junior title, New Westminster Bruins)	1977, 1978
Memorial Cup All-Star Team	1978
Stafford Smythe Memorial Trophy (Memorial Cup MVP)	1978

=== Vancouver Canucks ===
Award	Year
Most Exciting Player Award	1980
Cyclone Taylor Award (team MVP)	1980, 1983, 1986
Cyrus H. McLean Trophy (team leading scorer)	1980, 1983

Sporting positions
Preceded by Kevin McCarthy	Vancouver Canucks captain 1982–1990	Succeeded by Doug Lidster; Trevor Linden; Dan Quinn
Preceded by Jim Benning	General manager of the Vancouver Canucks (interim); 2021	Succeeded by Jim Rutherford (interim)
