= Ryan Johnson (ice hockey, born 1976) =

Canadian ice hockey player

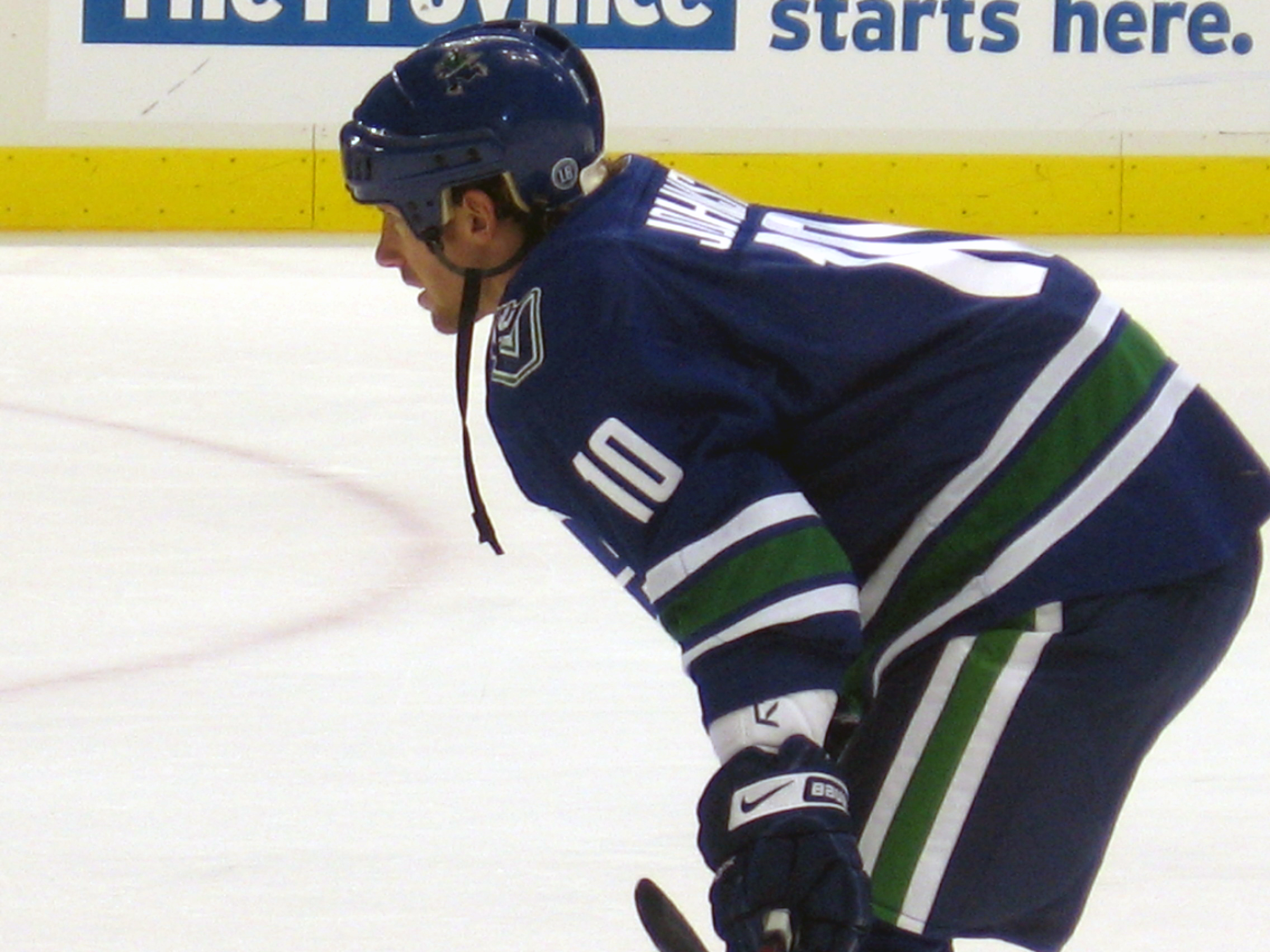
- Johnson with the Vancouver Canucks in January 2009
- Born: June 14, 1976 (age 50) Thunder Bay, Ontario, Canada
- Height: 6 ft 1 in (185 cm)
- Weight: 199 lb (90 kg; 14 st 3 lb)
- Position: Centre
- Shot: Left
- Played for: Florida Panthers; Tampa Bay Lightning; St. Louis Blues; Vancouver Canucks; Chicago Blackhawks
- NHL draft: 36th overall, 1994; Florida Panthers
- Playing career: 1996–2011

Ryan M. Johnson (born June 14, 1976) is a Canadian ice hockey executive and former professional centre who currently serves as the general manager for the Vancouver Canucks of the National Hockey League (NHL). Johnson was selected 36th overall in the second round of the 1994 NHL entry draft by the Florida Panthers, with whom he spent parts of five seasons in two tenures, and additionally played in the NHL for the Tampa Bay Lightning, St. Louis Blues, Vancouver Canucks, and Chicago Blackhawks.

== Playing career ==
=== Florida Panthers and Lightning (1997–2003) ===
Johnson was drafted by the Florida Panthers in the second round, 36th overall, of the 1994 NHL entry draft. He subsequently played two seasons of college hockey with the University of North Dakota. He scored 19 points in 21 games, splitting the 1995–96 season with the Canadian national team.

In his first three seasons with the Panthers, Johnson played with Florida's American Hockey League (AHL) affiliates, the Carolina Monarchs and the Beast of New Haven. In 1999–2000, he earned a full-time roster spot with the Panthers, but was traded during that season to the Tampa Bay Lightning with Dwayne Hay in exchange for Mike Sillinger on March 14, 2000.

Johnson spent one full season with the Lightning, scoring 21 points in 2000–01. On July 10, 2001, he was traded back to the Panthers with a sixth-round draft pick (later traded back to Tampa Bay) in 2003 in exchange for Václav Prospal. However, he missed the majority of his first season back in Florida from a head injury suffered on December 22, 2001, against the St. Louis Blues.

=== St. Louis Blues (2003–2008) ===
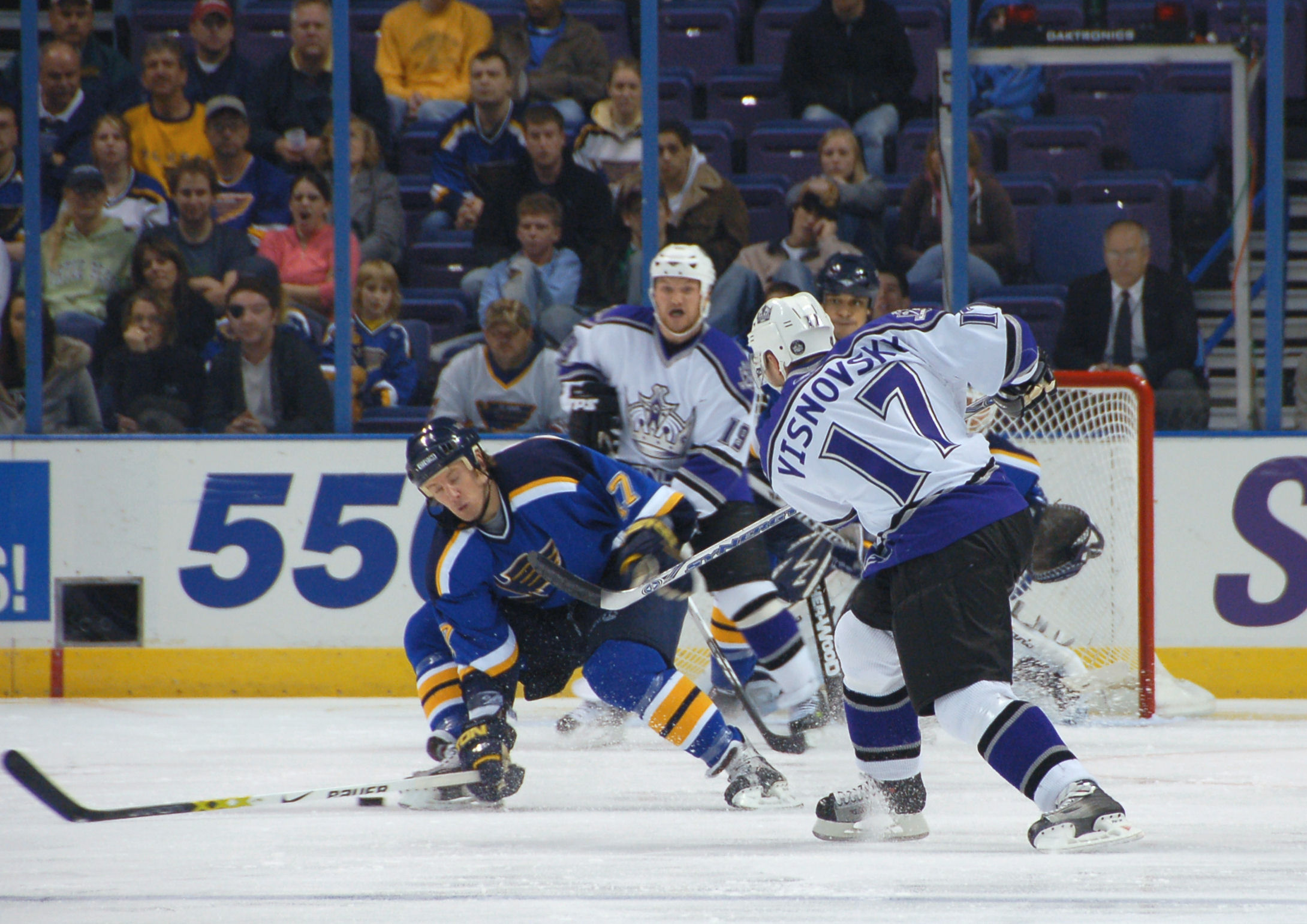
Johnson blocks a shot by Los Angeles Kings defenceman Lubomir Visnovsky in December 2006.

Near the trade deadline of the next season, he was placed on waivers and acquired by the St. Louis Blues on February 19, 2003. Johnson spent four full seasons with the Blues, playing with the Missouri River Otters of the United Hockey League (UHL) during the 2004–05 NHL lockout. After posting 18 points and leading all forwards in the league in shot blocks with 105 in 2007–08,

=== Vancouver Canucks (2008–2010) ===
Johnson became an unrestricted free agent in the 2008 off-season; he signed a two-year, $2.3 million contract with the Vancouver Canucks. Playing his first season in Vancouver, Johnson broke a finger on his right hand while blocking a shot on November 20, 2008, in a 3–2 win against the Minnesota Wild. He played with the injury for two games before being pulled from the lineup. It was then revealed that Johnson had also suffered a broken bone in his left foot in the third game of the season on October 13 in a 5–1 loss to the Washington Capitals, which he had played through for six weeks. After missing 20 games, Johnson returned to the lineup on January 9, 2009, despite still feeling considerable pain in his fractured finger. After completing his first season in Vancouver with two goals and seven assists for nine points in 62 games, it was revealed that off-season surgery was required for the injured finger.

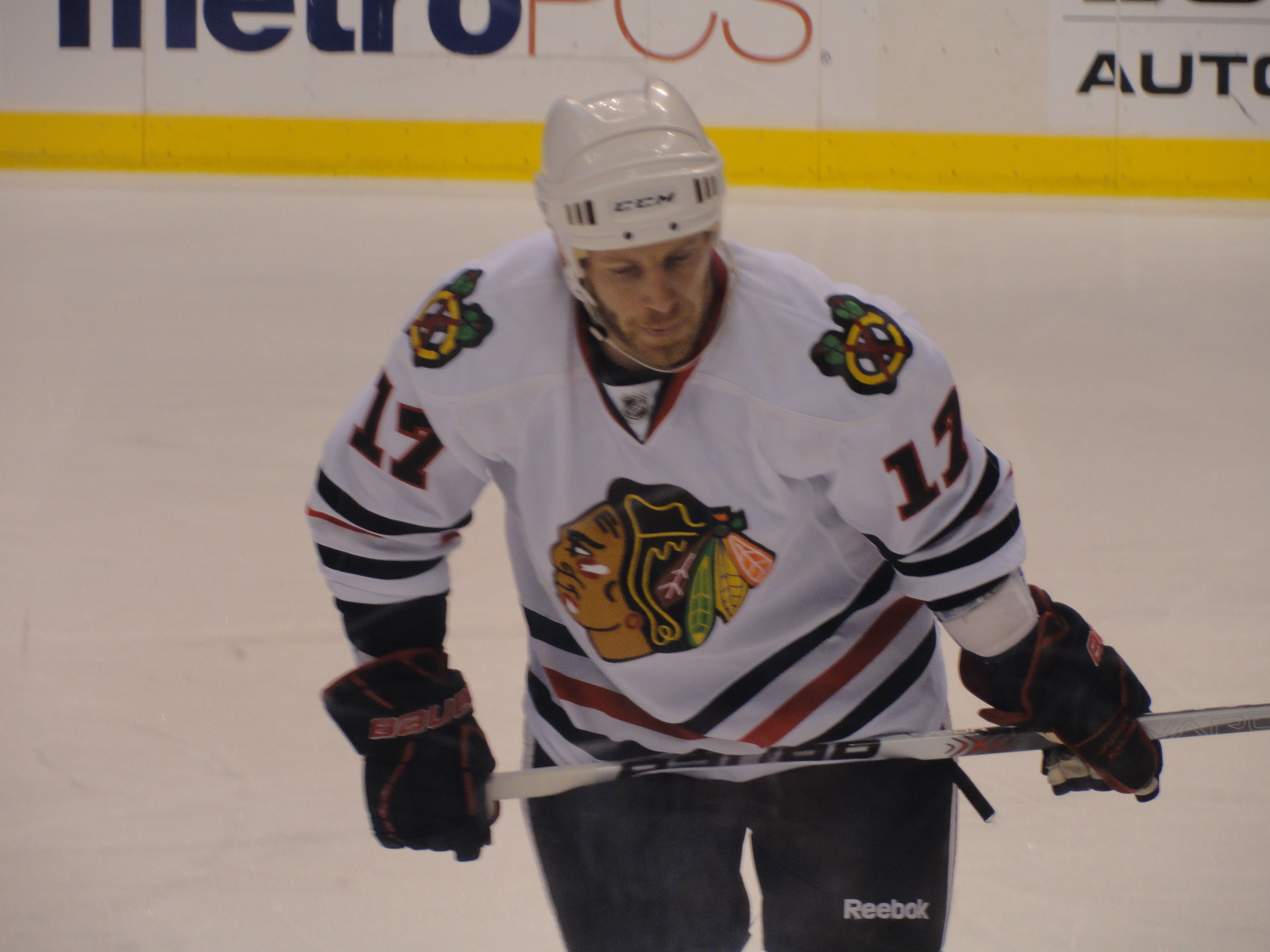
Johnson with the Chicago Blackhawks in February 2011

Nearly a month into the 2009–10 season, Johnson was involved in a head-first collision into the end boards in a game against the Detroit Red Wings on October 27, 2009. After chipping the puck into the offensive zone, Johnson lost his balance trying to skate around Detroit Red Wings defenceman and captain Nicklas Lidström and slid heavily into the boards with his shoulder and neck. He was taken off the ice in a stretcher after laying motionless on the ice for several moments. He would miss the next five games with a concussion. He was then later sidelined for 12 games on January 21, 2010 with a broken foot in a 4–3 win over the Dallas Stars. He played through lingering injuries on both feet until suffering another broken foot on April 4 in a 4–3 win against the Minnesota Wild while blocking a shot, limiting him to 58 games.

=== Chicago Blackhawks (2010–2011) ===
After not receiving a contract extension from the Canucks, Johnson became an unrestricted free agent. Unsigned to start the 2010–11 season, he was given a professional tryout with the Chicago Blackhawks' AHL affiliate, the Rockford IceHogs, in December 2010. He played one game for the IceHogs before signing a one-year deal with the Blackhawks. Immediately recalled after the deal, Johnson played his first game with the Blackhawks in a 4–1 win over the Detroit Red Wings on December 17, 2010. He finished with 34 games played for the Blackhawks in 2010–11 with one goal, five assists and six points while playing on the Hawks' fourth line with Tomáš Kopecký and Viktor Stålberg. Johnson was goalless but recorded an assist in six playoff games in the Blackhawks first round exit in seven games to Johnson's former team, the Presidents' Trophy-winning Vancouver Canucks.

== Managerial career ==
Following the end of his playing career, Johnson re-joined the Vancouver Canucks in 2013 as a player development consultant, subsequently serving as assistant director of player development, director of player development, and special advisor to the general manager. Additionally, Johnson served as the general manager of the Canucks' American Hockey League affiliates from 2017 to 2026, initially with the Utica Comets until 2021, and continuing in the role with the Abbotsford Canucks after the franchise's relocation. In the 2025 season, he oversaw the franchise's first Calder Cup win. On May 14, 2026, Johnson was promoted to general manager of the NHL Canucks, succeeding Patrik Allvin.

== Personal life ==
Johnson was born to Jim and Judy Johnson in Thunder Bay, Ontario, on June 14, 1976. He has a sister, Sarah, and two older brothers: Greg, who played with the Detroit Red Wings, Pittsburgh Penguins, Chicago Blackhawks, and Nashville Predators; and Corey. After his father lost a battle with cancer on June 7, 2008, at age 63, Johnson completed a 42.2-kilometre marathon the following year on June 20, 2009, in Duluth, Minnesota, as a tribute. He finished the run in just under four hours at three hours, 59 minutes and 52 seconds.

== Career statistics ==
=== Regular season and playoffs ===
			Regular season					Playoffs
Season	Team	League	GP	G	A	Pts	PIM	GP	G	A	Pts	PIM
1992–93	Thunder Bay Kings AAA	Midget	60	25	33	58	—	—	—	—	—	—
1993–94	Thunder Bay Flyers	USHL	48	14	36	50	28	—	—	—	—	—
1994–95	University of North Dakota	WCHA	38	6	22	28	39	—	—	—	—	—
1995–96	Canadian National Team	Intl	28	5	12	17	14	—	—	—	—	—
1995–96	University of North Dakota	WCHA	21	2	17	19	14	—	—	—	—	—
1996–97	Carolina Monarchs	AHL	78	18	24	42	28	—	—	—	—	—
1997–98	Beast of New Haven	AHL	64	19	48	67	12	3	0	1	1	0
1997–98	Florida Panthers	NHL	10	0	2	2	0	—	—	—	—	—
1998–99	Beast of New Haven	AHL	37	8	19	27	18	—	—	—	—	—
1998–99	Florida Panthers	NHL	1	1	0	1	0	—	—	—	—	—
1999–00	Florida Panthers	NHL	66	4	12	16	14	—	—	—	—	—
1999–00	Tampa Bay Lightning	NHL	14	0	2	2	2	—	—	—	—	—
2000–01	Tampa Bay Lightning	NHL	80	7	14	21	44	—	—	—	—	—
2001–02	Florida Panthers	NHL	29	1	3	4	10	—	—	—	—	—
2002–03	Florida Panthers	NHL	58	2	5	7	26	—	—	—	—	—
2002–03	St. Louis Blues	NHL	17	0	0	0	12	6	0	2	2	6
2003–04	St. Louis Blues	NHL	69	4	7	11	8	3	0	0	0	0
2004–05	Missouri River Otters	UHL	29	7	14	21	12	6	1	0	1	13
2005–06	St. Louis Blues	NHL	65	3	6	9	33	—	—	—	—	—
2006–07	St. Louis Blues	NHL	59	7	4	11	47	—	—	—	—	—
2007–08	St. Louis Blues	NHL	79	5	13	18	22	—	—	—	—	—
2008–09	Vancouver Canucks	NHL	62	2	7	9	12	10	1	1	2	2
2009–10	Vancouver Canucks	NHL	58	1	4	5	12	4	0	0	0	2
2010–11	Rockford IceHogs	AHL	1	0	0	0	0	—	—	—	—	—
2010–11	Chicago Blackhawks	NHL	34	1	5	6	8	6	0	1	1	2
NHL totals			701	38	84	122	250	29	1	4	5	12

Sporting positions
Preceded by Patrik Allvin	General manager of the Vancouver Canucks; 2026–present	Incumbent
