= Patrik Allvin =

Swedish ice hockey player (born 1974)

- Born: October 10, 1974 (age 52); Falun, Sweden
- Occupation: Ice hockey executive

Patrik Allvin (born 10 October 1974) is a Swedish former ice hockey defenceman and current assistant general manager of the Seattle Kraken. He was previously general manager of the Vancouver Canucks from 2022 to 2026, and prior to that assistant general manager and briefly interim general manager of the Pittsburgh Penguins.

== Playing career ==
During his ice hockey playing career, Allvin played for Leksands IF in the Swedish Elitserien, as well as numerous other clubs in the Swedish Division 1. He also played for the Quebec Rafales (previously the Atlanta Knights) in the IHL, and the Pensacola Ice Pilots (previously the Nashville Knights) in the ECHL. He retired from professional ice hockey after a knee injury in 2002, at the age of 27.

== Management career ==
Allvin worked as the European scout for the Montreal Canadiens between 2002 and 2006. He worked for the Pittsburgh Penguins for 16 years, winning three Stanley Cups (first as European Scout and back-to-back as Director of Amateur Scouting), and eventually worked up to Assistant General Manager and interim GM after the departure of Jim Rutherford.

On 26 January 2022, Allvin was announced as the 12th general manager in Canucks history. Allvin is the first Swedish general manager in the NHL. Allvin was fired by the Canucks on 17 April 2026, after Vancouver finished last in the NHL for the 2025–26 season. On 11 June 2026, Allvin was hired as vice president and assistant general manager by the Seattle Kraken.

== Personal life ==
Allvin has two children, one of which, Adam, currently plays high school ice hockey for St. George's School (Vancouver). He is married to Marie Klinberg-Allvin, a university professor of women's and children's health.

Sporting positions
Preceded by Jim Rutherford	General manager of the Pittsburgh Penguins (Interim); 2021	Succeeded by Ron Hextall
Preceded by Jim Rutherford (interim)	General manager of the Vancouver Canucks; 2022–2026	Succeeded by Ryan Johnson
