= Jim Rutherford =

Canadian ice hockey player and manager

- Hockey Hall of Fame, 2019 (Builder)
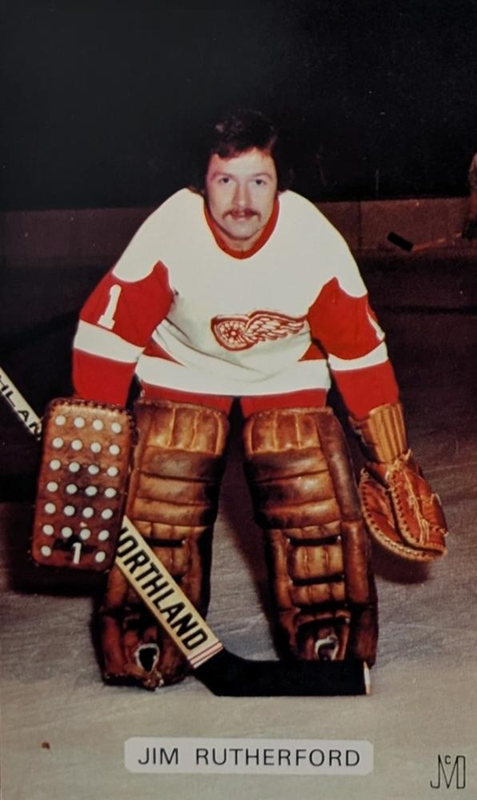
- Rutherford with the Detroit Red Wings, c. 1970s
- Born: February 17, 1949 (age 77) Beeton, Ontario, Canada
- Height: 5 ft 8 in (173 cm)
- Weight: 168 lb (76 kg; 12 st 0 lb)
- Position: Goaltender
- Caught: Left
- Played for: Detroit Red Wings; Pittsburgh Penguins; Toronto Maple Leafs; Los Angeles Kings
- National team: Canada
- NHL draft: 10th overall, 1969; Detroit Red Wings
- Playing career: 1969–1983

James Earl Rutherford (born February 17, 1949) is a Canadian former professional ice hockey goaltender and executive. He was the president of hockey operations of the Vancouver Canucks of the National Hockey League (NHL) where he now currently serves as senior advisor and alternate governor. Prior to his position with the Canucks, Rutherford held the same position with the Hartford Whalers/Carolina Hurricanes for almost two decades, assuming the position in June 1994 and stepping down from that position in April 2014. He then joined the Pittsburgh Penguins as general manager, having been named to that position on June 6, 2014, and resigning on January 27, 2021, citing "personal reasons". Rutherford has won the Stanley Cup three times as a general manager, with the Hurricanes in 2006 and with the Penguins in 2016 and 2017.

== Playing career ==
Rutherford played in the NHL as a goaltender from 1969 to 1983. Rutherford played primarily with the Detroit Red Wings, but he also spent time with the Pittsburgh Penguins, Toronto Maple Leafs, and Los Angeles Kings.

Rutherford retired as a player in 1983 at the age of 33 with the record of 151-227-59.

== Post-playing career ==
Prior to serving with the Penguins as general manager, Rutherford was the president and general manager, as well as a part-owner of the Carolina Hurricanes – known as the Hartford Whalers until 1997 – having joined the franchise in 1994 and helping build the Hurricanes team that won the Stanley Cup in 2006. Later he helped build the Penguins team that won the Stanley Cup in 2016 and again in 2017.

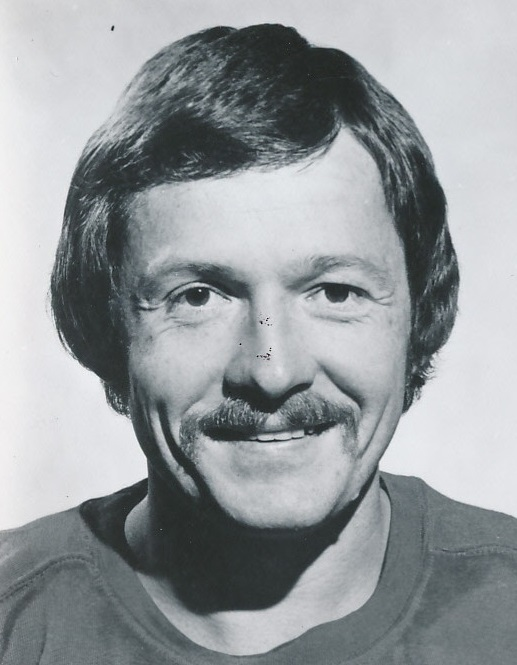
Rutherford in 1976, while a member of the Detroit Red Wings.

Rutherford was one of the pioneers of the popular trend of ice hockey goaltenders decorating his mask in 1976. Initially, a friend painted a pair of red wings at the temples of Rutherford's mask without his permission. Because he did not have time to get another fitted mask before game time, he reluctantly wore the decorated mask on the ice. On June 23, 2016, he won the Jim Gregory General Manager of the Year Award. In 2019, Jim Rutherford was inducted into the Hockey Hall of Fame.

Rutherford resigned from his post as general manager of the Penguins on January 27, 2021, for personal reasons. He later stated that his passion and focus for the job faded in the eleven months that had followed the outbreak of the COVID-19 pandemic in March 2020. On December 9, 2021, Rutherford was named president of hockey operations and interim general manager of the Vancouver Canucks.

On May 5, 2026, soon after the 2026 NHL Draft Lottery where the Canucks dropped from 1st to 3rd overall, Rutherford announced that he would be stepping down as president of hockey operations after the Draft, and that he would move into an adviser role.

On August 20, 2026, Rutherford alongside Larry Murphy, Jack McGregor, & Marc-Andre Fleury was selected to the Class of 2026 for induction into the Pittsburgh Penguins Hall of Fame. The now 2-time Hall of Famer will join the other 3 greats on November 14th before the Penguins meet the Ottawa Senators.

== Career statistics ==
=== Regular season and playoffs ===
			Regular season									Playoffs
Season	Team	League	GP	W	L	T	MIN	GA	SO	GAA	SV%	GP	W	L	MIN	GA	SO	GAA	SV%
1966–67	Aurora Tigers	SJHL	30	—	—	—	1800	63	2	2.10	—	—	—	—	—	—	—	—	—
1967–68	Hamilton Red Wings	OHA-Jr.	9	—	—	—	510	19	0	2.24	—	1	0	0	20	0	0	0.00	1.000
1968–69	Hamilton Red Wings	OHA-Jr.	45	—	—	—	2730	163	3	3.36	—	5	—	—	300	27	0	5.40	—
1968–69	Montréal Jr. Canadiens	M-Cup	—	—	—	—	—	—	—	—	—	6	6	0	366	20	—	3.28	—
1969–70	Fort Worth Wings	CHL	35	12	14	8	2,060	92	1	2.68	—	4	3	1	244	12	0	2.95	—
1970–71	Detroit Red Wings	NHL	29	7	15	3	1,498	94	1	3.77	.877	—	—	—	—	—	—	—	—
1970–71	Fort Worth Wings	CHL	3	—	—	—	180	11	0	3.66	—	—	—	—	—	—	—	—	—
1971–72	Pittsburgh Penguins	NHL	40	17	15	5	2,160	116	1	3.22	.894	4	0	4	240	14	0	3.50	.903
1971–72	Hershey Bears	AHL	3	3	0	0	180	7	0	2.33	—	—	—	—	—	—	—	—	—
1972–73	Pittsburgh Penguins	NHL	49	20	22	5	2,660	129	3	2.91	.912	—	—	—	—	—	—	—	—
1973–74	Pittsburgh Penguins	NHL	26	7	12	4	1,428	82	0	3.45	.883	—	—	—	—	—	—	—	—
1973–74	Detroit Red Wings	NHL	25	9	11	4	1,418	86	0	3.64	.888	—	—	—	—	—	—	—	—
1974–75	Detroit Red Wings	NHL	59	20	29	10	3,475	217	2	3.75	.877	—	—	—	—	—	—	—	—
1975–76	Detroit Red Wings	NHL	44	13	25	6	2,633	158	4	3.60	.885	—	—	—	—	—	—	—	—
1976–77	Detroit Red Wings	NHL	48	7	34	6	2,736	180	0	3.95	.867	—	—	—	—	—	—	—	—
1977–78	Detroit Red Wings	NHL	43	20	17	4	2,466	134	1	3.26	.880	3	2	1	180	12	0	4.01	.862
1978–79	Detroit Red Wings	NHL	32	13	14	5	1,890	103	1	3.27	.884	—	—	—	—	—	—	—	—
1979–80	Detroit Red Wings	NHL	23	6	13	3	1,321	92	1	4.18	.854	—	—	—	—	—	—	—	—
1980–81	Detroit Red Wings	NHL	10	2	6	2	600	43	0	4.30	.850	—	—	—	—	—	—	—	—
1980–81	Toronto Maple Leafs	NHL	18	4	10	2	959	81	0	5.07	.853	—	—	—	—	—	—	—	—
1980–81	Los Angeles Kings	NHL	3	3	0	0	180	10	0	3.33	.896	1	0	0	20	2	0	6.00	.750
1981–82	Los Angeles Kings	NHL	7	3	3	0	380	43	0	6.79	.792	—	—	—	—	—	—	—	—
1981–82	New Haven Nighthawks	AHL	29	12	11	4	1,614	89	0	3.31	.877	—	—	—	—	—	—	—	—
1982–83	Detroit Red Wings	NHL	1	0	1	0	60	7	0	7.00	.821	—	—	—	—	—	—	—	—
1982–83	Adirondack Red Wings	AHL	12	3	7	1	591	44	0	4.47	.853	—	—	—	—	—	—	—	—
NHL totals			457	151	227	59	25,852	1575	14	3.66	.879	8	2	5	440	28	0	3.82	.883

=== International ===
Year	Team	Event	GP	W	L	T	MIN	GA	SO	GAA
1977	Canada	WC	2	1	0	0	89	7	0	4.72
1979	Canada	WC	6	1	5	0	320	24	0	4.50
Senior totals			8	2	5	0	409	31	0	4.55

Sporting positions
Preceded by Steve Andrascik	Detroit Red Wings first-round draft pick 1969	Succeeded by Serge Lajeunesse
Preceded by Paul Holmgren	General manager of the Hartford Whalers/Carolina Hurricanes; 1994–2014	Succeeded by Ron Francis
Preceded by Jason Botterill (interim)	General manager of the Pittsburgh Penguins; 2014–2021	Succeeded by Patrik Allvin (interim)
Preceded by Stan Smyl (interim)	General manager of the Vancouver Canucks (interim); 2021–2022	Succeeded by Patrik Allvin
