= Tiger Williams =

Canadian ice hockey player (born 1954)

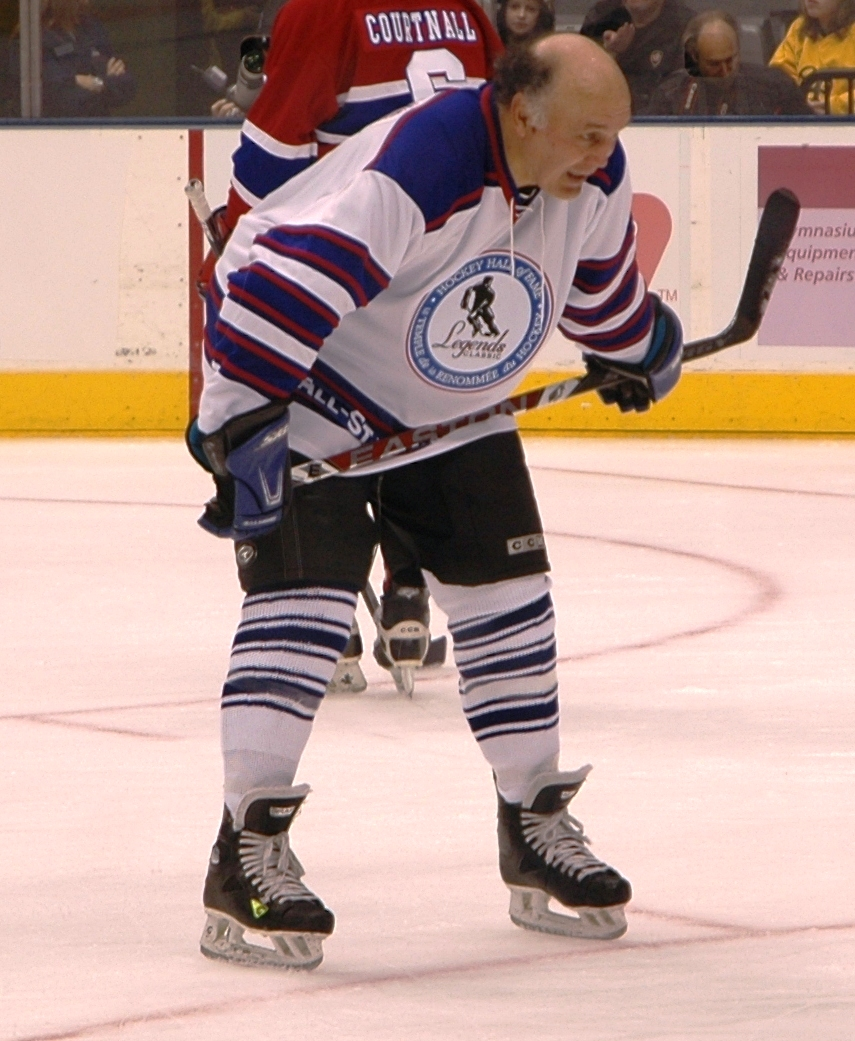
- Williams in 2008
- Born: February 3, 1954 (age 72) Weyburn, Saskatchewan, Canada
- Height: 5 ft 11 in (180 cm)
- Weight: 190 lb (86 kg; 13 st 8 lb)
- Position: Forward
- Shot: Left
- Played for: Toronto Maple Leafs; Vancouver Canucks; Detroit Red Wings; Los Angeles Kings; Hartford Whalers
- NHL draft: 31st overall, 1974; Toronto Maple Leafs
- WHA draft: 33rd overall, 1974; Cincinnati Stingers
- Playing career: 1974–1988

David James "Tiger" Williams (born February 3, 1954) is a Canadian former professional ice hockey player. He played as a forward in the National Hockey League (NHL) for 14 seasons with the Toronto Maple Leafs, Vancouver Canucks, Detroit Red Wings, Los Angeles Kings, and Hartford Whalers.

With the Swift Current Broncos, Williams established himself as both a scoring threat and as a tough and competitive player. Drafted in the second round in the 1974 NHL draft and 3rd round of the WHA draft, Williams started his career with the Toronto Maple Leafs of the NHL and quickly became known for his role as an enforcer with flashes of scoring, which saw him score 30 goals twice and also record six seasons with 300 penalty minutes. In the 1980–81 season, he was named to the NHL All-Star Game for the only time in his career while scoring a career-high 35 goals. The following year, he was part of the first Canucks team to reach the Stanley Cup Final.

He played his final NHL game in the 1987–88 season and retired with 241 goals and 272 assists in 962 games with 3,971 penalty minutes, the latter being an all-time NHL record.

== Early life ==
Williams was born in Weyburn, Saskatchewan. He played minor hockey from a young age, acquiring the nickname "Tiger" as a 5-year-old by his coach. At the age of 16, he left his town to play with the Vernon Lakers in the British Columbia Junior Hockey League. He joined the Swift Current Broncos of the Western Canada Hockey League in 1971.

One teammate of his during his time with the Broncos was Bryan Trottier, who had a long career with the New York Islanders. He credits Williams with talking him out of quitting hockey as a youngster.

In 2015, Williams was inducted into the Saskatchewan Hockey Hall of Fame.

== NHL career ==
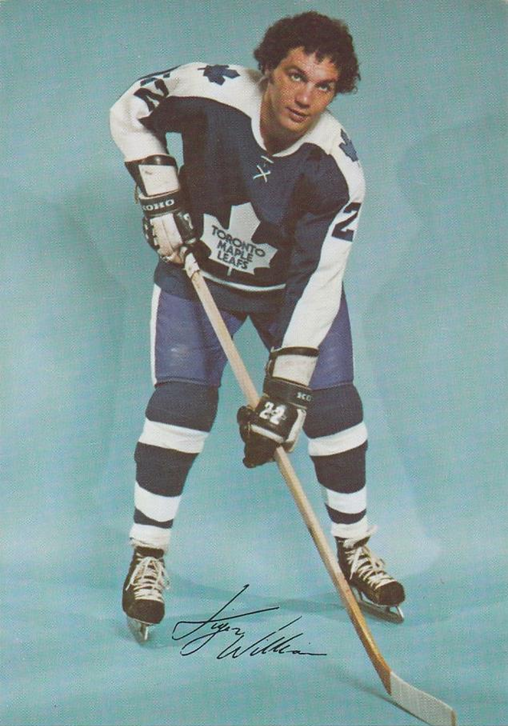
1975 photo of Tiger Williams with the Toronto Maple Leafs

Williams was drafted by the Toronto Maple Leafs in the second round (31st overall) of the 1974 NHL amateur draft. He was also drafted by the Cincinnati Stingers of the World Hockey Association (WHA) in the third round (33rd overall) in the 1974 WHA Amateur Draft, but he signed with the Maple Leafs.

He made his NHL debut with the Maple Leafs on January 7, 1975 against the New York Islanders. He broke many Maple Leaf and NHL records for penalty minutes and led the league twice with 338 minutes in 1976–77 and 298 in 1978–79. During his best season in Toronto, he scored 22 goals in 55 games, then on February 18, 1980 he was traded to the Vancouver Canucks for Rick Vaive and Bill Derlago. He scored 8 more goals in 23 games that season with Vancouver, for a total of 30 goals.

The next season, 1980–81, in Vancouver, Williams scored a career high of 35 goals, the most among the Canucks, and 62 points. He also led the league in penalty minutes with 343, the third-highest number in his career. He also earned a place in the mid-season All-Star game, in which he played on a line with Wayne Gretzky and Mike Bossy. The 1981–82 season saw him become the all-time penalty minutes leader, passing Dave Schultz. He played a key role in the team's surprise run to the 1982 Stanley Cup Final. Williams played in Vancouver until the end of the 1983–84 season.

Harry Neale, who coached him in Vancouver, described Williams in a subsequent interview:

He’s the most competitive player I ever coached. And I don’t mean fighting. I mean practice, preparation, everything. He was more talented than most people thought, but his desire set him apart. He hated to lose, whether it was drills or the Stanley Cup playoffs.

After Vancouver, Williams played for the Detroit Red Wings for most of the 1984–85 NHL season, then was traded to the Los Angeles Kings. In Los Angeles, he set his career high of 358 penalty minutes for one season. It was Williams who coined the nickname "Lucky" for Luc Robitaille, which he did as a way to differentiate from teammate Morris Lukowich, who most people called "Luke" and the name stuck. Williams played in 28 total games of the 1987–88 season (two for Los Angeles, 26 for the Hartford Whalers, recording six goals with 93 penalty minutes. He played his final game on January 30, 1988 and was subsequently released. He retired in 1988.

Among the various fights he got involved included the following: delivering an open head wound to Scotty Bowman (then coach of the Buffalo Sabres) when he had leaned over the bench to watch an ongoing fight, getting assault charges when smashing the stick over Dennis Owchar's head, and getting into fights with Islanders goaltender Billy Smith.

When asked in 2013 how he would fare in the modern game, Williams remarked:

How would I fare (in today’s game)? I’d make about 12 million a year, score 25 goals, don’t wear any equipment. Maybe shin pads. You’d have to block the odd shot. Then I’d hit somebody and I’d be suspended for half a year and I’d be donating six million dollars, which is not bad. I’d still have six million left. You could get suspended at Christmastime and go snowmobiling until the playoffs start and you’re ready to go.

== After the NHL ==
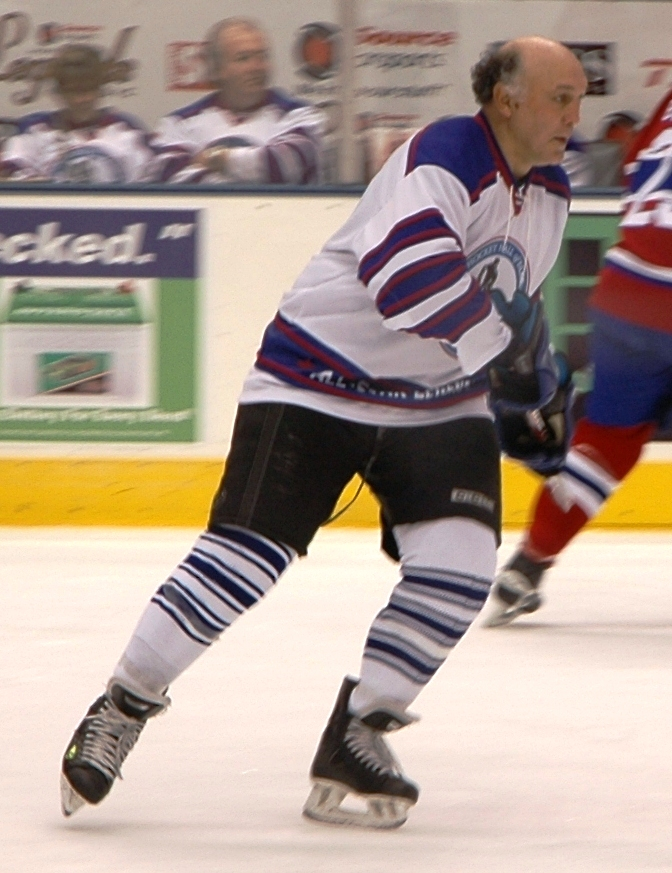
Williams with the 2008 All-Star Legends in Toronto

In 1984 Williams published his autobiography, Tiger: A Hockey Story, co-written by James Lawton. In 1987, he released a cookbook entitled Done Like Dinner: Tiger In the Kitchen, co-written with Kasey Wilson. It included many hockey-inspired recipes, including Habs Tourtière, Stanley Cup Bars, and Luc Robitaille's Lasagna Omelette.

Williams re-emerged briefly as an inline hockey player in 1993, appearing in one game and scoring two points for the Vancouver Voodoo of Roller Hockey International.

In 1996, Canadian punk rock band The Hanson Brothers spearheaded a campaign to agitate for Williams' induction into the Hockey Hall of Fame. They included a mail-in postcard in their album Sudden Death which purchasers could send to the Hall.

At the 2002 NHL All-Star Game in Los Angeles, the NHL held the NHL All-Star Celebrity Challenge. The home team all wore number 22 in honour of Williams.

Williams was honored with a Legends Night by the Kings in 2017.

On February 9, 2018, Williams was charged with sexual assault while on a military trip to Latvia. These charges were withdrawn by Crown attorney Meaghan Cunningham after he issued an apology.

Williams was arrested and charged with one count of uttering a threat to cause death and one count of assault stemming from an April 10, 2023 incident in Beaver Flat, Saskatchewan. Police said the other man involved did not sustain injuries or require medical attention. On September 6, 2023, the charges were dropped.

He appeared as himself in the first episode of the Canadian sitcom Rent-a-Goalie.

== Records ==
=== NHL official records ===
- Most NHL career regular season penalty minutes: 3,971
- Most NHL penalty minutes, career, including playoffs: 4,426

=== Maple Leafs records ===
- Most playoff penalty minutes: 240
- Most penalty minutes in one season by a left wing: 351 in 1978

=== Canucks records ===
- Most playoff penalty minutes: 181
- Most penalty minutes in one playoff year: 116 in 1982
- Most penalty minutes in one playoff series: 51 vs. Chicago in 1982

== Awards and achievements ==
- Played in 1981 NHL All-Star Game.

== Career statistics ==
=== Regular season and playoffs ===
Bold indicates led league
Bold italics indicate NHL record

			Regular season					Playoffs
Season	Team	League	GP	G	A	Pts	PIM	GP	G	A	Pts	PIM
1971–72	Swift Current Broncos	WCHL	68	12	22	34	278	—	—	—	—	—
1972–73	Swift Current Broncos	WCHL	68	44	58	102	266	—	—	—	—	—
1973–74	Swift Current Broncos	WCHL	66	52	56	108	310	12	14	10	24	23
1974–75	Toronto Maple Leafs	NHL	42	10	19	29	187	7	1	3	4	25
1974–75	Oklahoma City Blazers	CHL	39	16	11	27	202	—	—	—	—	—
1975–76	Toronto Maple Leafs	NHL	78	21	19	40	299	10	0	0	0	75
1976–77	Toronto Maple Leafs	NHL	77	18	25	43	**338**	9	3	6	9	29
1977–78	Toronto Maple Leafs	NHL	78	19	31	50	351	12	1	2	3	**63**
1978–79	Toronto Maple Leafs	NHL	77	19	20	39	**298**	6	0	0	0	**48**
1979–80	Toronto Maple Leafs	NHL	55	22	18	40	197	—	—	—	—	—
1979–80	Vancouver Canucks	NHL	23	8	5	13	81	3	0	0	0	20
1980–81	Vancouver Canucks	NHL	77	35	27	62	**343**	3	0	0	0	20
1981–82	Vancouver Canucks	NHL	77	17	21	38	341	17	3	7	10	**116**
1982–83	Vancouver Canucks	NHL	68	8	13	21	265	4	0	3	3	12
1983–84	Vancouver Canucks	NHL	67	15	16	31	294	4	1	0	1	13
1984–85	Detroit Red Wings	NHL	55	3	8	11	163	—	—	—	—	—
1984–85	Los Angeles Kings	NHL	12	4	3	7	43	3	0	0	0	4
1984–85	Adirondack Red Wings	AHL	8	5	2	7	4	—	—	—	—	—
1985–86	Los Angeles Kings	NHL	72	20	29	49	320	—	—	—	—	—
1986–87	Los Angeles Kings	NHL	76	16	18	34	358	5	3	2	5	30
1987–88	Los Angeles Kings	NHL	2	0	0	0	6	—	—	—	—	—
1987–88	Hartford Whalers	NHL	26	6	0	6	87	—	—	—	—	—
NHL totals			962	241	272	513	3,971	83	12	23	35	455

== See also ==
- List of NHL players with 2,000 career penalty minutes
- Fighting in ice hockey
- Enforcer (ice hockey)
