= Ryan Dempster =

Canadian baseball player (born 1977)

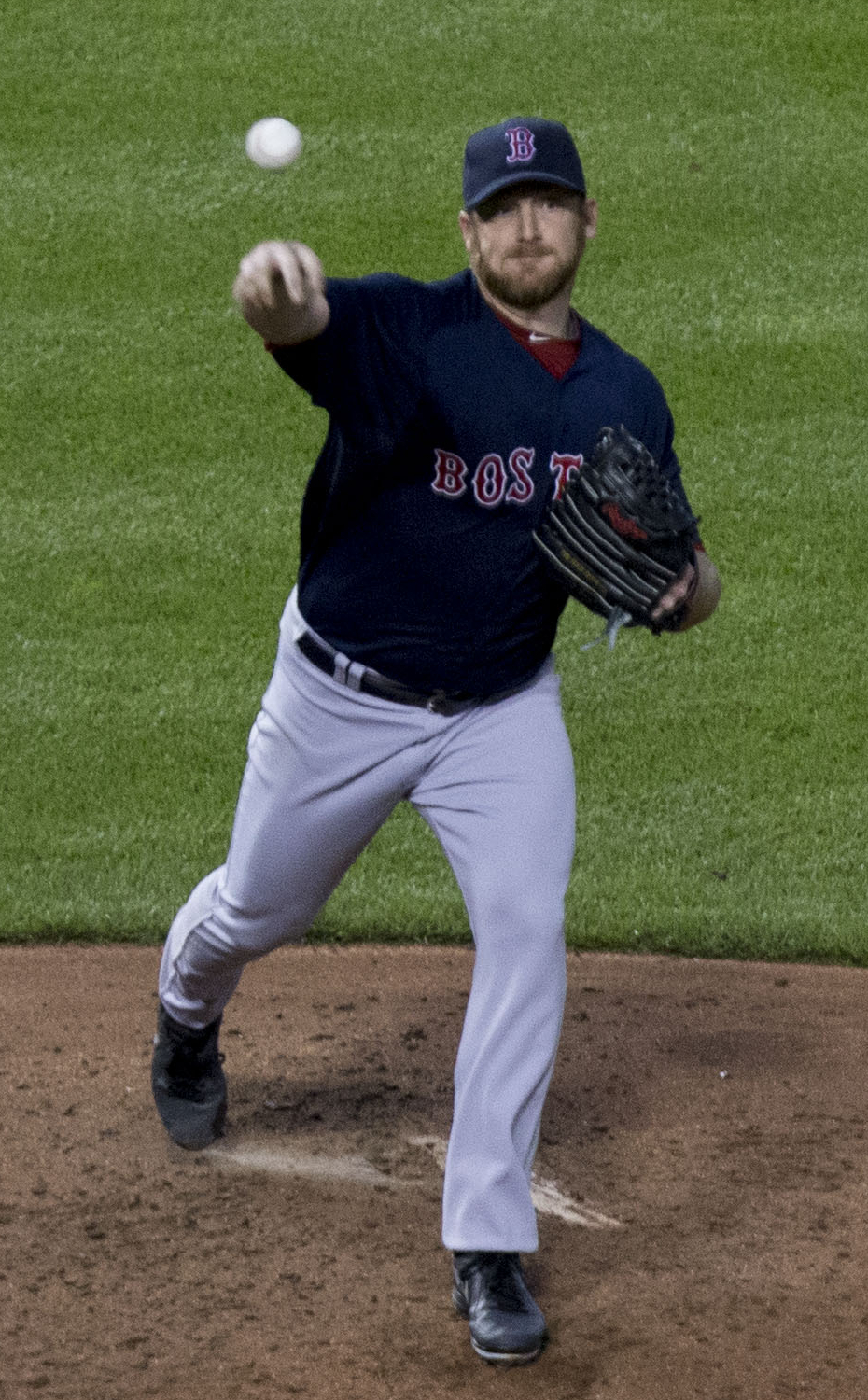
- Dempster with the Boston Red Sox in 2013
- Pitcher
- Born: May 3, 1977 (age 49); Gibsons, British Columbia, Canada
- Batted: Right Threw: Right

MLB debut
- May 23, 1998, for the Florida Marlins

Last MLB appearance
- September 29, 2013, for the Boston Red Sox

MLB statistics
- Win–loss record: 132–133
- Earned run average: 4.35
- Strikeouts: 2,075
- Saves: 87
- Stats at Baseball Reference

Teams
- Florida Marlins (1998–2002); Cincinnati Reds (2002–2003); Chicago Cubs (2004–2012); Texas Rangers (2012); Boston Red Sox (2013)

Career highlights and awards
- 2× All-Star (2000, 2008); World Series champion (2013)

Member of the Canadian

Baseball Hall of Fame
- Induction: 2019

Ryan Scott Dempster (born May 3, 1977) is a Canadian former professional baseball pitcher, who played in Major League Baseball (MLB) for the Florida Marlins, Cincinnati Reds, Chicago Cubs, Texas Rangers, and Boston Red Sox. Dempster batted and threw right-handed. He was both a starter and a reliever in his career.

== Professional career ==
=== Draft and minor leagues ===
Dempster was drafted by the Texas Rangers in the 3rd round of the 1995 MLB draft and began his career with the Gulf Coast Rangers. He subsequently played for the Hudson Valley Renegades, the Kane County Cougars and the Charleston RiverDogs.

=== Florida Marlins (1998–2002) ===
Dempster was traded to the Florida Marlins on August 8, 1996 (with Rick Helling) for John Burkett.

Dempster made his MLB debut for the Marlins, working two innings of relief, on May 23, 1998, against the Pittsburgh Pirates, allowing three earned runs on two hits in that game. He later made his first start on June 1 against the Chicago Cubs, lasting only 1 1/3 innings as he was shelled for five runs while allowing 4 hits (including 2 home runs) and walking 3, to record his first career loss. After falling to 0–3 he got his first Major League win on June 28 against the Boston Red Sox, when he allowed only 1 run in 7 innings. He was 1–5 with a 7.08 ERA in 14 appearances (11 starts) that season.

In 1999, Dempster started 25 games and finished with a 7–8 record and a 4.71 ERA. The following season, Dempster was 13–10 with a 3.66 ERA in 33 starts, including two complete games and one shutout. On May 7, 2000, he tossed a one-hitter against the New York Mets. He was selected to the 2000 Major League Baseball All-Star Game. Over the next two seasons, Dempster was 20–20 and had a 4.88 ERA with the Marlins.

=== Cincinnati Reds (2002–2003) ===
On July 11, 2002, the Marlins traded Dempster to the Cincinnati Reds for Juan Encarnación, Wilton Guerrero and Ryan Snare. In the second half of the season, he was 5–5 with a 6.19 ERA in 15 starts.

In the 2003 season, he made 20 starts (and two relief appearances) and was 3–7 with a 6.54 ERA. In August 2003, he underwent Tommy John surgery on his right elbow and missed the rest of the season.

=== Chicago Cubs (2004–2012) ===
After his release by the Reds, he signed as a free agent with the Chicago Cubs on January 21, 2004. After rehabbing from his surgery, he joined the Cubs on August 1 and appeared in 23 games, all out of the bullpen. He picked up his first MLB career save on September 15, 2004, against the Pittsburgh Pirates.

In 2005, after starting 6 games, Dempster was named the closer for the Cubs, replacing LaTroy Hawkins.

He collected 33 saves in 35 opportunities, the best save percentage in the league; in both blown saves, he collected the win. He is the only Cub and one of just three players ever to both start a game and collect 30 saves in the same season. On October 1, 2005, the Cubs signed him through 2008 in a US$15.5 million contract extension.

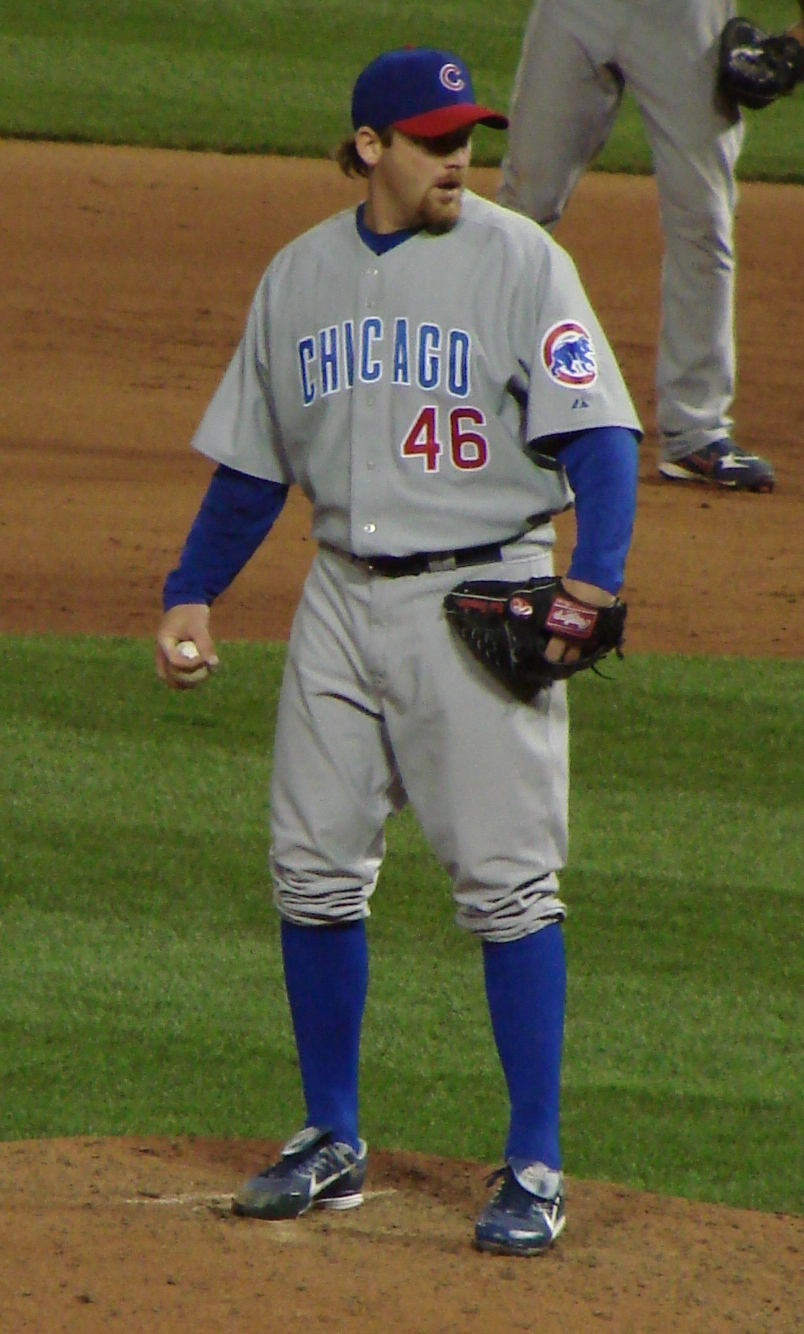
Dempster pitching for the Chicago Cubs in April 2007

He emerged as one of the team's most consistent relievers in 2007. At one point, Lou Piniella, the Cubs' manager, was considering promoting Dempster to a starting pitcher. However, the idea was short lived, as a struggling bullpen forced Dempster to remain as closer. He recorded 16 saves in 18 opportunities before missing two weeks of playtime on account of an injured oblique muscle.

During spring training in 2008, Dempster's performance resulted in his being designated to the third spot on the starting rotation, with the closer job going to Kerry Wood. On April 3, 2008, he earned his first win as a home starter since a 2002 win with the Marlins against the Cubs. On May 15, 2008, Dempster recorded a career high 12 strikeouts in a game. He pitched 8 1/3 innings, and gave up only 6 hits. On July 8, 2008, he became the first Cubs pitcher in 31 seasons to start 10–0 at home. Dempster finished the season with 17–6 record, with 2.96 ERA and 183 strikeouts in 201 2/3 innings. Dempster threw sliders 32.9% of the time in 2008, more than any other NL starting pitcher.

Dempster opened the Cubs 2008 postseason campaign against the Los Angeles Dodgers on September 26, 2008. Dempster accumulated a high pitch count early and, after he was unable to get outs with 0–2 counts twice, he surrendered a grand slam to James Loney and was pulled in favor of Sean Marshall. In 2008, Dempster led the majors in sacrifice hits, with 19.

Following the 2008 season, Dempster re-signed with the Cubs for four years and a reported $52 million.

In May 2009 MLB indicated that the Commissioner's Office would review Dempster's up-and-in pitch to Milwaukee Brewers slugger Ryan Braun. Cubs manager Lou Piniella commented, "You've got to tie Braun up from time to time. If you don't, he's going to feast on you." After reviewing the tapes, however, Major League Baseball found no wrongdoing on Dempster's part, and decided not to take any action against him.

Dempster finished the season with a 3.65 ERA and a record of 11–9 in 31 starts.

In 2010, he was 15–12 with a 3.85 ERA in 34 starts and in 2011 he was 10–14 with a 4.80 ERA in 34 starts.

=== Texas Rangers (2012) ===
On July 31, 2012, Dempster was traded to Texas at the trade deadline, for minor leaguers Christian Villanueva and Kyle Hendricks. He made his Rangers debut on August 2, 2012. Dempster had a 5.09 ERA with a 7–3 record in 12 games. He pitched 69 innings and had 70 strikeouts with the Rangers.

=== Boston Red Sox (2013) ===
Dempster signed a two-year contract worth $26.5 million with the Boston Red Sox after the 2012 season.

On August 18, 2013, in a game against the rival New York Yankees, Dempster was involved in a contentious incident with Alex Rodriguez. The first time he faced Rodriguez, he threw one pitch behind him, then subsequently, Dempster's 3–0 pitch struck Rodriguez on the left elbow pad and ricocheted off his back to a loud cheer from the fans in attendance. Although home plate umpire Brian O'Nora warned Dempster and both dugouts, Dempster was allowed to stay in the game. Later, in the top of the 6th inning, Dempster gave up a home run to Rodriguez and the Red Sox lost the game 9–6. On August 20, MLB gave Dempster a five-game suspension (though he did not miss a start) and an undisclosed fine for hitting Rodriguez. For a couple of years following the incident, Dempster claimed he did not mean to hit Rodriguez then finally admitted in August 2016 the incident was, indeed, intentional.

Dempster finished the 2013 season at 8–9 with a 4.57 ERA in 32 games (29 starts). He was part of the 25-man active roster for the postseason making three relief appearances and won his first championship title when the Red Sox beat the St. Louis Cardinals in the 2013 World Series.

=== Retirement ===
On February 16, 2014, Dempster announced he would not pitch or engage in any baseball activities for the entire 2014 year, stating that he wanted to spend some time with his family. The Red Sox placed Dempster on the reserve/retired list for the 2014 season and elected not to grant him a full season salary worth $13.25 million.

On October 8, 2014, Dempster officially announced his retirement. On December 5, it was announced that Dempster would be taking a job in the Cubs' front office as an assistant to general manager Jed Hoyer and president of baseball operations Theo Epstein.

In January 2017, Dempster indicated he would pitch for Team Canada in the 2017 World Baseball Classic. He started two games for Canada in the Classic, pitching a total of only 2 1/3 innings while giving up 7 earned runs.

== Broadcasting career ==
On April 22, 2014, Dempster was hired by MLB Network as a studio color analyst.

In 2020, Dempster joined the newly launched Marquee Sports Network as a studio and game analyst for Cubs telecasts.

== Pitching style ==
Dempster threw five pitches with some regularity: a four-seam fastball and two-seam fastball averaging about 90 mph, a cut fastball in the high 80s, a slider in the mid 80s, and a splitter in the low 80s. Dempster favored his slider over his splitter when throwing to right-handed hitters and often imparted an obvious, prolonged wiggle to his glove as part of his windup, a move he claims is done in order to prevent tipping opposing batters to his pitches.

== Personal life ==
Dempster is widely known for his laid-back attitude, constantly joking with fans and teammates, and is said to be a positive contribution to a team's clubhouse. Dempster's fun and easy-going personality was especially evident when, in comments to an Arizona newspaper in March 2007, Dempster stated that if his career as a closer began to tumble, he would pursue ninja training.

=== DiGeorge syndrome ===
In early June 2009, Dempster released a statement explaining that his daughter, Riley Dempster, had DiGeorge Syndrome, also known as Velo-cardio-facial syndrome (VCFS), 22q11.2 deletion syndrome, and Shprintzen syndrome (after Dr. Robert Shprintzen who identified it in 1978). About 1 baby in 1800 is born with this genetic deletion which ubiquitously affects swallowing, breathing, and speech. Dempster did this because he wanted to help raise awareness of this genetic disease.

When asked if she would lead a normal life, he replied, "Yeah, she will. There can be (problems), but so far all the signs are good. There's a lot of work to do. They say there are 186 symptoms you can have. You just check off ones as you go along."

After roughly 2 months in the hospital, Riley was able to go home in early June.

== Awards and honors ==
- National League All-Star (2000, 2008)
- Named one of the 99 "Good Guys" in professional sports by The Sporting News.
- Tip O'Neill Award (2000)
- Played in the NHL All-Star Celebrity Challenge on January 30, 2002.
- Was inducted into the BC Sports Hall of Fame on May 31, 2018.

== See also ==
- List of Major League Baseball career strikeout leaders
- List of Major League Baseball single-inning strikeout leaders
