= Doug Halward =

Canadian ice hockey player (born 1955)

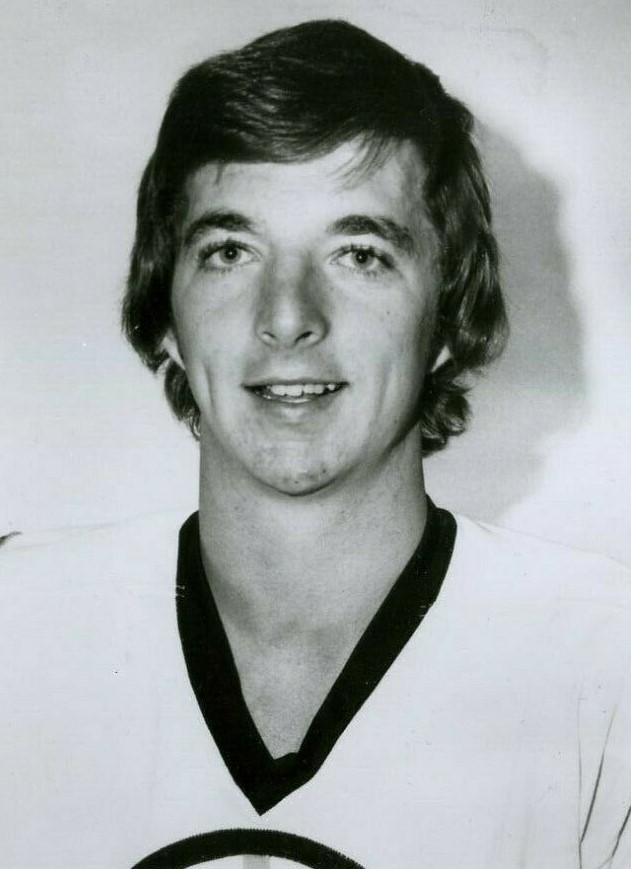
- Born: November 1, 1955 (age 70) Toronto, Ontario, Canada
- Height: 6 ft 1 in (185 cm)
- Weight: 200 lb (91 kg; 14 st 4 lb)
- Position: Defence
- Shot: Left
- Played for: Boston Bruins; Los Angeles Kings; Vancouver Canucks; Detroit Red Wings; Edmonton Oilers
- NHL draft: 14th overall, 1975; Boston Bruins
- WHA draft: 29th overall, 1975; Quebec Nordiques
- Playing career: 1975–1989
Medal record
Representing Canada
World Championships
| Bronze medal – third place | 1983 West Germany |
| Silver medal – second place | 1985 Prague |

Douglas Robert Halward (born November 1, 1955) is a Canadian former professional ice hockey defenceman who played 663 games in the National Hockey League (NHL) for the Boston Bruins, Los Angeles Kings, Vancouver Canucks, Detroit Red Wings and Edmonton Oilers. He helped the Bruins reach the 1977 Stanley Cup Finals and the Canucks reach the 1982 Stanley Cup Finals.

Halward was born in Toronto, Ontario. He played junior hockey for the Peterborough Petes. As a youth, he played in the 1968 Quebec International Pee-Wee Hockey Tournament with the Toronto Young Nationals minor ice hockey team.

== Career statistics ==
=== Regular season and playoffs ===
| | | | Regular season | | | | | Playoffs |
| Season | Team | League | GP | G | A | Pts | PIM | GP | G | A | Pts | PIM |
|---|---|---|---|---|---|---|---|---|---|---|---|---|
| 1972–73 | Downsview Beavers | OPJHL | 34 | 6 | 14 | 20 | 57 | — | — | — | — | — |
| 1973–74 | Peterborough Petes | OHA-Jr. | 69 | 1 | 15 | 16 | 103 | — | — | — | — | — |
| 1974–75 | Peterborough Petes | OMJHL | 68 | 11 | 52 | 63 | 97 | 3 | 1 | 2 | 3 | 5 |
| 1975–76 | Rochester Americans | AHL | 54 | 6 | 11 | 17 | 51 | 4 | 1 | 0 | 1 | 4 |
| 1975–76 | Boston Bruins | NHL | 22 | 1 | 5 | 6 | 6 | 1 | 0 | 0 | 0 | 0 |
| 1976–77 | Rochester Americans | AHL | 54 | 4 | 28 | 32 | 26 | — | — | — | — | — |
| 1976–77 | Boston Bruins | NHL | 18 | 2 | 2 | 4 | 6 | 6 | 0 | 0 | 0 | 4 |
| 1977–78 | Rochester Americans | AHL | 42 | 8 | 14 | 22 | 17 | 6 | 0 | 3 | 3 | 2 |
| 1977–78 | Boston Bruins | NHL | 25 | 0 | 2 | 2 | 2 | — | — | — | — | — |
| 1978–79 | Springfield Indians | AHL | 14 | 5 | 1 | 6 | 10 | — | — | — | — | — |
| 1978–79 | Los Angeles Kings | NHL | 27 | 1 | 5 | 6 | 13 | 1 | 0 | 0 | 0 | 12 |
| 1979–80 | Los Angeles Kings | NHL | 63 | 11 | 45 | 56 | 52 | 1 | 0 | 0 | 0 | 2 |
| 1980–81 | Los Angeles Kings | NHL | 51 | 4 | 15 | 19 | 96 | — | — | — | — | — |
| 1980–81 | Vancouver Canucks | NHL | 7 | 0 | 1 | 1 | 4 | 2 | 0 | 1 | 1 | 6 |
| 1981–82 | Dallas Black Hawks | CHL | 22 | 8 | 18 | 26 | 49 | — | — | — | — | — |
| 1981–82 | Vancouver Canucks | NHL | 37 | 4 | 13 | 17 | 40 | 15 | 2 | 4 | 6 | 44 |
| 1982–83 | Vancouver Canucks | NHL | 75 | 19 | 33 | 52 | 83 | 4 | 1 | 0 | 1 | 21 |
| 1983–84 | Vancouver Canucks | NHL | 54 | 7 | 16 | 23 | 35 | 4 | 3 | 1 | 4 | 2 |
| 1984–85 | Vancouver Canucks | NHL | 71 | 7 | 27 | 34 | 82 | — | — | — | — | — |
| 1985–86 | Vancouver Canucks | NHL | 70 | 8 | 25 | 33 | 111 | 3 | 0 | 0 | 0 | 4 |
| 1986–87 | Vancouver Canucks | NHL | 10 | 0 | 3 | 3 | 34 | — | — | — | — | — |
| 1986–87 | Detroit Red Wings | NHL | 11 | 0 | 3 | 3 | 19 | — | — | — | — | — |
| 1987–88 | Detroit Red Wings | NHL | 70 | 5 | 21 | 26 | 130 | 8 | 1 | 4 | 5 | 18 |
| 1988–89 | Adirondack Red Wings | AHL | 4 | 1 | 0 | 1 | 0 | — | — | — | — | — |
| 1988–89 | Detroit Red Wings | NHL | 8 | 0 | 1 | 1 | 36 | — | — | — | — | — |
| 1988–89 | Edmonton Oilers | NHL | 24 | 0 | 7 | 7 | 25 | 2 | 0 | 0 | 0 | 0 |
| NHL totals | | | 653 | 69 | 224 | 293 | 774 | 47 | 7 | 10 | 17 | 113 |

=== International ===
| Year | Team | Event | GP | G | A | Pts | PIM |
|---|---|---|---|---|---|---|---|
| 1974 | Canada | WJC | 5 | 1 | 0 | 1 | 11 |
| 1983 | Canada | WC | 10 | 1 | 2 | 3 | 6 |
| 1985 | Canada | WC | 10 | 1 | 2 | 3 | 4 |
| Senior totals | | | 20 | 2 | 4 | 6 | 10 |

| Preceded by Don Larway | Boston Bruins first-round draft pick 1975 | Succeeded by Clayton Pachal |
