= NHL All-Star Celebrity Challenge =

Hockey game

The NHL All-Star Celebrity Challenge was a benefit hockey game to raise money for Hockey's All-Star Kids and Children's Hospital Los Angeles. The games featured celebrities teaming up with NHL alumni on two teams led by Jerry Bruckheimer and David E. Kelley. The teams were named Bruckheimer's Bad Boys and Kelley's Heroes.

Presented by Microsoft Windows XP, the NHL All-Star Celebrity Challenge was held in Los Angeles at the Staples Center on Wednesday, January 30, 2002.

== Rosters ==
Bruckheimer's Bad Boys

- Kim Alexis
- Glenn Anderson
- Allan Bester
- Dave Coulier
- Mark DeCarlo
- Ryan Dempster
- Ron Duguay
- Phil Esposito
- Bobby Farrelly
- Brendan Fehr
- Matt Frewer
- Rod Gilbert
- Cuba Gooding, Jr.
- Scott Grimes
- Paul Guilfoyle
- Chris Jericho
- Jari Kurri
- McG
- Barry Melrose
- Bernie Nicholls
- Rene Robert
- Michael Rosenbaum
- Kiefer Sutherland
- Dave Taylor
- Alan Thicke
- Alex Trebek
- Mike Vallely
- Llewellyn Wells

Kelley's Heroes

- Stephen Baldwin
- Rachel Blanchard
- David Boreanaz
- Mel Bridgman
- Dino Ciccarelli
- Patrick Flatley
- Jerry Houser
- Joshua Jackson
- Pat LaFontaine
- Denis Leary
- Pete Mahovlich
- Lanny McDonald
- Neal McDonough
- Mark McGrath
- Dan Moriarty
- Lochlyn Munro
- Mike Murphy
- Ken Olandt
- Rob Paulsen
- Pete Peeters
- Larry Playfair
- Jason Priestley
- Chad Smith
- Peter Šťastný
- D. B. Sweeney
- Michael Vartan
- Barry Watson
- Scott Wolf

Unchosen from Draft

- Enrico Colantoni
- Alan Doyle
- Frank Gehry
- Michel Goulet
- Sean McCann
- Rogatien Vachon
- Donnie Wahlberg

== Staff ==
Assistant coaches

- Brad Garrett
- Jeremy Piven
- Bill Goldberg

Trainers

- Patricia Heaton
- Dulé Hill
- Colin Mochrie
- Jane Seymour
