= Glendon, Alberta =

Glendon
- Village
- Village of Glendon
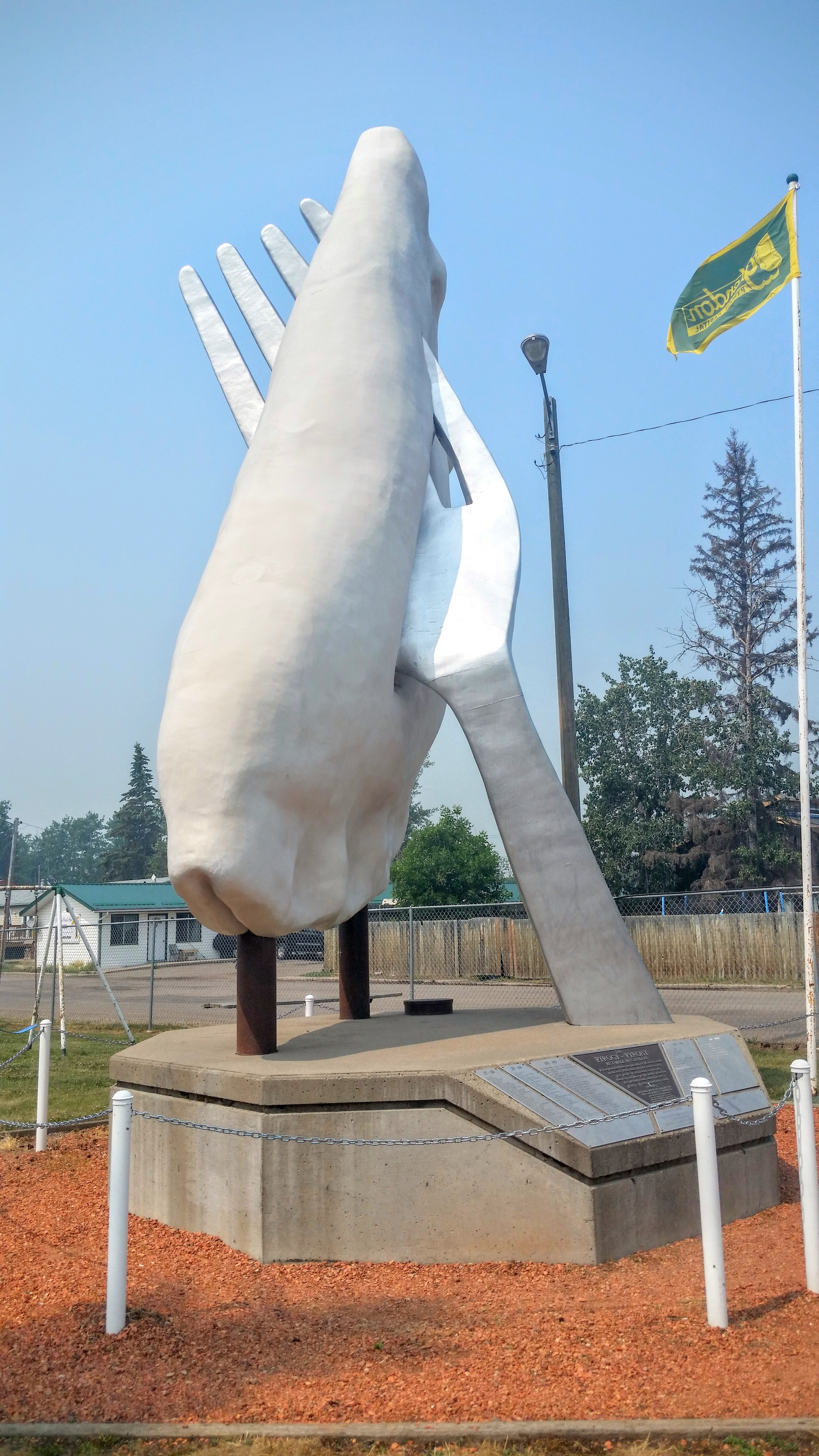
- World's largest pierogi sculpture

- Flag

- Location within Alberta
- Coordinates: 54°14′54″N 111°09′13″W
- Country: Canada
- Province: Alberta
- Region: Northern Alberta
- Census division: 12
- Municipal district: M.D of Bonnyville No. 87
- Incorporated
  - Village: January 1, 1956

Government
  - Mayor: Brian Papirny
  - Governing body: Glendon Village Council

Area (2021)
  - Land: 1.99 km^{2} (0.77 sq mi)
- Elevation: 587 m (1,926 ft)

Population (2021)
  - Total: 516
- Time zone: UTC−06:00 (Alberta Time)
- Postal code: T0A 1P0
- Highways: Highway 882; Highway 660
- Website: Official website

Glendon is a village in northern Alberta, Canada that is north of St. Paul. The community has the maiden name of an early postmaster's mother.

In 1993, the town unveiled its roadside tribute to the perogy. Their "Giant Perogy," complete with fork, is 7.6 m (24.9 ft) in height. It is one of the Giants of the Prairies. Glendon is home to former NHLer Stan Smyl.

== Demographics ==
In the 2021 Census of Population conducted by Statistics Canada, the Village of Glendon had a population of 516 living in 208 of its 256 total private dwellings, a change of 4.7% from its 2016 population of 493. With a land area of 1.99 km^{2} (0.77 sq mi), it had a population density of 259.3/km^{2} (671.6/sq mi) in 2021.

In the 2016 Census of Population conducted by Statistics Canada, the Village of Glendon recorded a population of 493 living in 208 of its 234 total private dwellings, a 1.4% change from its 2011 population of 486. With a land area of 1.99 km^{2} (0.77 sq mi), it had a population density of 247.7/km^{2} (641.6/sq mi) in 2016.

== See also ==
- List of communities in Alberta
- List of francophone communities in Alberta
- List of villages in Alberta
