= Gerry Minor =

Canadian ice hockey player (born 1958)

- Born: October 27, 1958 (age 67) Regina, Saskatchewan, Canada
- Height: 5 ft 8 in (173 cm)
- Weight: 178 lb (81 kg; 12 st 10 lb)
- Position: Centre
- Shot: Left
- Played for: Vancouver Canucks
- NHL draft: 90th overall, 1978; Vancouver Canucks
- Playing career: 1978–1987

Gerald Minor (born October 27, 1958) is a Canadian former professional ice hockey player who spent his entire NHL career with the Vancouver Canucks. Selected by the Canucks in the 1978 NHL Amateur Draft, Minor made his professional debut that year in the minor leagues, joining the Canucks in 1979. He spent five seasons playing for the Canucks and their minor league affiliates in the Central Hockey League and American Hockey League, and retired in 1987.

== Playing career ==
He had a quick release and a natural touch around the net and was a steady role player in five NHL seasons with the Canucks, where he held the record for most shorthanded goals by a rookie in the 1980–81 season. Minor helped set the Vancouver record for the fastest four goals in a game (done in 1 minute, 23 seconds), by scoring the first goal in a game vs. the Pittsburgh Penguins on November 26, 1980. He also set the Canucks' single-season record (since broken) for shorthanded goals with six in 1980–81. Minor missed most of 1981–82 season and the start of 1982 playoffs with a slight skull fracture, suffered during Vancouver's 1981 training camp, and with a broken left ankle - an injury suffered in Vancouver's January 10, 1982 game versus the Chicago Black Hawks. He scored one goal and three assists during the 1982 Stanley Cup Finals against the New York Islanders.

== Career statistics ==
=== Regular season and playoffs ===
			Regular season					Playoffs
Season	Team	League	GP	G	A	Pts	PIM	GP	G	A	Pts	PIM
1974–75	Regina Pat Blues	SJHL	38	28	19	47	56	—	—	—	—	—
1974–75	Regina Pats	WCHL	16	2	6	8	6	11	0	1	1	6
1975–76	Regina Pats	WCHL	71	24	41	65	124	6	0	8	8	14
1976–77	Regina Pats	WCHL	48	22	32	54	120	6	0	8	8	14
1977–78	Regina Pats	WCHL	66	54	75	129	238	13	15	22	37	31
1978–79	Fort Wayne Komets	IHL	42	18	28	46	67	—	—	—	—	—
1978–79	Dallas Black Hawks	CHL	37	14	25	39	76	—	—	—	—	—
1979–80	Vancouver Canucks	NHL	5	0	1	1	2	—	—	—	—	—
1979–80	Dallas Black Hawks	CHL	73	31	52	83	162	9	3	4	7	31
1980–81	Vancouver Canucks	NHL	74	10	14	24	108	3	0	0	0	8
1981–82	Vancouver Canucks	NHL	13	0	1	1	6	9	1	3	4	17
1981–82	Dallas Black Hawks	CHL	12	5	8	13	92	—	—	—	—	—
1982–83	Vancouver Canucks	NHL	39	1	5	6	57	—	—	—	—	—
1982–83	Fredericton Express	AHL	17	4	17	21	14	—	—	—	—	—
1983–84	Vancouver Canucks	NHL	9	0	0	0	0	—	—	—	—	—
1983–84	Fredericton Express	AHL	66	16	42	58	85	7	1	4	5	20
1984–85	New Haven Nighthawks	AHL	52	11	29	40	65	—	—	—	—	—
1984–85	Nova Scotia Oilers	AHL	21	4	10	14	8	—	—	—	—	—
1985–86	Indianapolis Checkers	IHL	72	28	46	74	108	5	3	4	7	8
1986–87	Muskegon Lumberjacks	IHL	68	17	22	39	93	15	3	9	12	32
NHL totals			140	11	21	32	173	12	1	3	4	25
