= Terry Simpson =

Canadian ice hockey player and coach

Biographical details
- Born: August 30, 1943 (age 83); Brantford, Ontario, Canada

Playing career
- 1964–1965: Jacksonville Rockets
- Position: Center

Coaching career (HC unless noted)
- 1972–1986: Prince Albert Raiders
- 1986–1989: New York Islanders
- 1989–1990: Prince Albert Raiders
- 1990–1993: Winnipeg Jets (assistant)
- 1993–1994: Philadelphia Flyers
- 1995–1996: Winnipeg Jets
- 1996–1998: Toronto Maple Leafs (assistant)
- 1998–1999: Red Deer Rebels

Head coaching record
- Overall: 159–168–41 (.488)

Accomplishments and honors

Championships
- 1985 Memorial Cup Champion

Terry Simpson (born August 30, 1943) is a Canadian former professional ice hockey player and a former National Hockey League (NHL) head coach.

Born in Brantford, Ontario, Simpson only played one season of professional ice hockey in 1964–65 for the Jacksonville Rockets of the EHL. He was the head coach of the New York Islanders, Philadelphia Flyers, and Winnipeg Jets.

Simpson had a notable coaching career in junior hockey for 10 years with the Prince Albert Raiders. He led the team to seven consecutive Anavet Cups and four Manitoba Centennial Cup titles. After the Raiders joined the Western Hockey League (WHL), he led them to the 1985 Memorial Cup championship.

Due to his success with the Raiders, the city of Prince Albert named the road leading to the Art Hauser Centre "Terry Simpson Lane" in his honour.

== Coaching record ==
Team	Year	Regular season						Post season
Team	Year	G	W	L	T	Pts	Division rank	Result
NYI	1986–87	80	35	33	12	82	3rd in Patrick	Lost in Second round (PHI)
NYI	1987–88	80	39	31	10	88	1st in Patrick	Lost in First round (NJD)
NYI	1988–89	27	7	18	2	(61)	6th in Patrick	(Fired)
PHI	1993–94	84	35	39	10	80	6th in Atlantic	Missed Playoffs
WPG	1994–95	15	7	7	1	(39)	6th in Central	Missed Playoffs
WPG	1995–96	82	36	40	6	78	5th in Central	Lost in First round (DET)
Total		368	159	168	41	359		

3 playoff appearances, 0 Stanley Cup Titles

Preceded by Al Arbour	Head coach of the New York Islanders; 1986–88	Succeeded by Al Arbour
Preceded by Bill Dineen	Head coach of the Philadelphia Flyers; 1993–94	Succeeded by Terry Murray
Preceded by John Paddock	Head coach of the Winnipeg Jets; 1995–96	Succeeded by Atlanta Thrashers coaches Curt Fraser
