= Joe Sacco (ice hockey) =

American ice hockey coach and player

- Born: February 4, 1969 (age 57) Medford, Massachusetts, U.S.
- Height: 6 ft 1 in (185 cm)
- Weight: 195 lb (88 kg; 13 st 13 lb)
- Position: Right wing
- Shot: Left
- Played for: Toronto Maple Leafs; Mighty Ducks of Anaheim; New York Islanders; Washington Capitals; Philadelphia Flyers
- Coached for: Colorado Avalanche; Boston Bruins
- National team: United States
- NHL draft: 71st overall, 1987; Toronto Maple Leafs
- Playing career: 1990–2003
- Coaching career: 2005–present
Medal record
Representing United States
Men's ice hockey
World Championships
Bronze medal – third place	1996 Vienna

Joseph William Sacco (born February 4, 1969) is an American professional ice hockey coach and former player who is an assistant coach for the New York Rangers of the National Hockey League (NHL). His younger brother David Sacco also played in the NHL.

== Playing career ==
As a youth, Sacco played in the 1982 Quebec International Pee-Wee Hockey Tournament with the Boston Braves minor ice hockey team. He played ice hockey for Medford High School in Massachusetts.

Drafted in the 1987 NHL entry draft by the Toronto Maple Leafs, Sacco played for Boston University before joining the Maple Leafs. Sacco also played for the Mighty Ducks of Anaheim, New York Islanders, Washington Capitals, and Philadelphia Flyers. In 738 NHL games, he recorded 94 goals and 119 assists.

== International play ==
Sacco represented the United States national team in 1989, 1990, 1991, 1992, 1994, 1996 and 2002 World Championships. He also played in the 1992 Winter Olympics.

== Coaching career ==
In the 2005–06 season, two years into retirement from playing, Sacco was hired as an assistant coach for the Lowell Lock Monsters, affiliate of the Colorado Avalanche. On May 7, 2007, after two years as an assistant, Sacco was named head coach of the Colorado Avalanche's new AHL franchise, the Lake Erie Monsters. Sacco then led the Monsters for the next two seasons and while recording somewhat unimpressive season's numbers with limited resources was credited with helping development of younger players to the NHL.

On June 4, 2009, a day after Avalanche head coach Tony Granato was fired, Sacco was promoted and later introduced as the new head coach of the Colorado Avalanche for the 2009–10 season, a job former Avs great Patrick Roy turned down days prior. After being projected finishing 15th in the Western Conference by most ice hockey pundits, Sacco coached the Avalanche to the 2010 Stanley Cup playoffs posting a record of 43–30–9 in his rookie year of coaching in the NHL. His team was eliminated in the conference quarterfinals after six games by the San Jose Sharks. On April 28, 2010, Sacco was named a finalist for the Jack Adams Award alongside Dave Tippett of the Phoenix Coyotes and Barry Trotz of the Nashville Predators. Following the 2012–13 season, his fourth year at the helm, finishing last in the Western Conference and out of the playoffs for a third consecutive year, Sacco was relieved of his duties on April 28, 2013, ending his eight-year association with the Avalanche.

On July 2, 2013, the Buffalo Sabres hired Sacco as an assistant coach.

On July 24, 2014, the Boston Bruins hired Sacco as an assistant coach. In July 2024, he was promoted to associate coach. On November 19, 2024, the Bruins named Sacco as interim head coach after Jim Montgomery's firing. Sacco went 24-30-6 as interim coach as the Bruins finished last in the Atlantic Division and missed the Stanley Cup playoffs for the first time since the 2015–16 season. As the Bruins interviewed candidates for a new head coach, Sacco was among those involved. However, on June 2, 2025, it was reported that Sacco had been informed that he would not remain as head coach.

On June 5, 2025, Sacco was named an assistant coach for the New York Rangers.

== Career statistics ==
=== Regular season and playoffs ===
			Regular season					Playoffs
Season	Team	League	GP	G	A	Pts	PIM	GP	G	A	Pts	PIM
1985–86	Medford High School	HS-MA	20	30	30	60	—	—	—	—	—	—
1986–87	Medford High School	HS-MA	21	22	32	54	—	—	—	—	—	—
1987–88	Boston University	HE	34	14	22	36	38	—	—	—	—	—
1988–89	Boston University	HE	33	21	19	40	66	—	—	—	—	—
1989–90	Boston University	HE	44	28	24	52	70	—	—	—	—	—
1990–91	Newmarket Saints	AHL	49	18	17	35	24	—	—	—	—	—
1990–91	Toronto Maple Leafs	NHL	20	0	5	5	2	—	—	—	—	—
1991–92	United States National Team	Intl	50	11	26	37	61	—	—	—	—	—
1991–92	Toronto Maple Leafs	NHL	17	7	4	11	4	—	—	—	—	—
1991–92	St. John's Maple Leafs	AHL	—	—	—	—	—	1	1	1	2	0
1992–93	St. John's Maple Leafs	AHL	37	14	16	30	45	7	6	4	10	2
1992–93	Toronto Maple Leafs	NHL	23	4	4	8	8	—	—	—	—	—
1993–94	Mighty Ducks of Anaheim	NHL	84	19	18	37	61	—	—	—	—	—
1994–95	Mighty Ducks of Anaheim	NHL	41	10	8	18	23	—	—	—	—	—
1995–96	Mighty Ducks of Anaheim	NHL	76	13	14	27	40	—	—	—	—	—
1996–97	Mighty Ducks of Anaheim	NHL	77	12	17	29	35	11	2	0	2	2
1997–98	Mighty Ducks of Anaheim	NHL	55	8	11	19	24	—	—	—	—	—
1997–98	New York Islanders	NHL	25	3	3	6	10	—	—	—	—	—
1998–99	New York Islanders	NHL	73	3	0	3	45	—	—	—	—	—
1999–2000	Washington Capitals	NHL	79	7	16	23	50	5	0	0	0	4
2000–01	Washington Capitals	NHL	69	7	7	14	48	6	0	0	0	2
2001–02	Washington Capitals	NHL	65	0	7	7	51	—	—	—	—	—
2002–03	Philadelphia Phantoms	AHL	6	4	3	7	4	—	—	—	—	—
2002–03	Philadelphia Flyers	NHL	34	1	5	6	20	4	0	0	0	0
NHL totals			738	94	119	213	421	26	2	0	2	8

=== International ===
Year	Team	Event	GP	G	A	Pts	PIM
1989	United States	WJC	7	3	1	4	2
1990	United States	WC	10	1	1	2	2
1991	United States	WC	10	1	0	1	6
1992	United States	OG	8	0	2	2	0
1992	United States	WC	6	1	0	1	4
1994	United States	WC	8	0	1	1	14
1996	United States	WC	8	2	4	6	2
2002	United States	WC	7	2	1	3	2
Junior totals			7	3	1	4	2
Senior totals			57	7	9	16	30

== Head coaching record ==
=== NHL ===
Team	Year	Regular season						Postseason			
Team	Year	G	W	L	OTL	Pts	Finish	W	L	Win %	Result
COL	2009–10	82	43	30	9	95	2nd in Northwest	2	4	.333	Lost in conference quarterfinals (SJS)
COL	2010–11	82	30	44	8	68	4th in Northwest	—	—	—	Missed playoffs
COL	2011–12	82	41	35	6	88	3rd in Northwest	—	—	—	Missed playoffs
COL	2012–13	48	16	25	7	39	5th in Northwest	—	—	—	Missed playoffs
BOS	2024–25	60	24	30	6	54	8th in Atlantic	—	—	—	Missed playoffs
NHL total		354	154	164	36			2	4	.333	1 playoff appearance

=== AHL ===
Team	Year	Regular season							Postseason			
Team	Year	G	W	L	OTL	SOL	Pts	Finish	W	L	Win %	Result
LEM	2007–08	80	26	41	6	7	65	6th in North	—	—	—	Missed playoffs
LEM	2008–09	80	34	38	3	5	76	6th in North	—	—	—	Missed playoffs
AHL total		160	60	79	9	12			—	—	—	

== See also ==
- List of NHL head coaches

Sporting positions
Preceded by Tony Granato	Head coach of the Colorado Avalanche; 2009–2013	Succeeded by Patrick Roy
Preceded by Jim Montgomery	Head coach of the Boston Bruins (interim); 2024–25	Succeeded by Marco Sturm
