= Doug Weight =

American ice hockey player (born 1971)

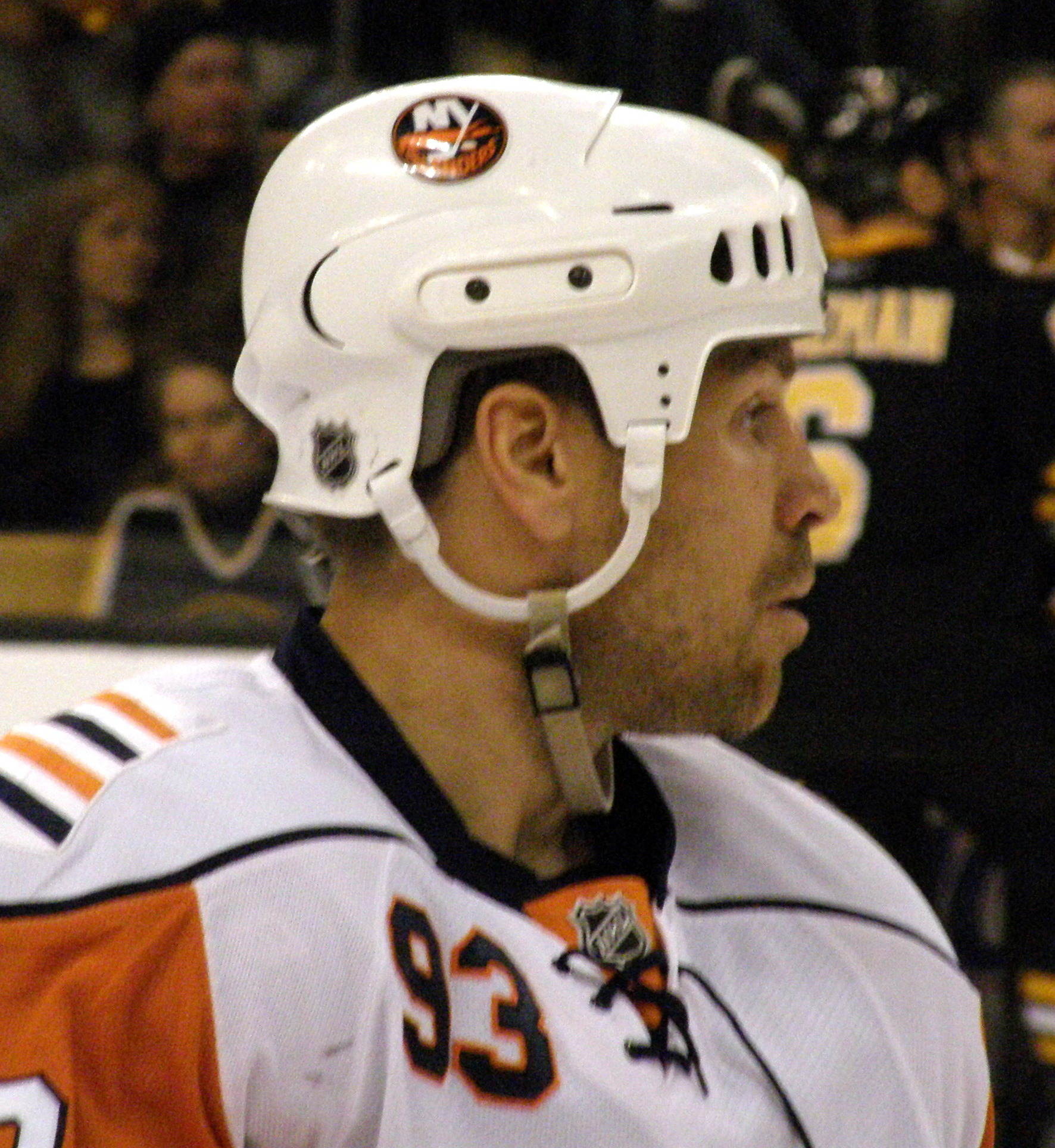
- Weight with the New York Islanders in 2008
- Born: January 21, 1971 (age 55) Warren, Michigan, U.S.
- Height: 5 ft 11 in (180 cm)
- Weight: 196 lb (89 kg; 14 st 0 lb)
- Position: Center
- Shot: Left
- Played for: New York Rangers; Edmonton Oilers; St. Louis Blues; Carolina Hurricanes; Anaheim Ducks; New York Islanders
- Coached for: New York Islanders
- National team: United States
- NHL draft: 34th overall, 1990; New York Rangers
- Playing career: 1991–2010
- Coaching career: 2011–2018

Douglas Daniel Weight (born January 21, 1971) is an American former professional ice hockey player, coach, and current hockey operations adviser for the San Jose Sharks. He played as a center for 19 seasons in the National Hockey League (NHL) for the New York Rangers, Edmonton Oilers, St. Louis Blues, Carolina Hurricanes, Anaheim Ducks, and New York Islanders.

Drafted in the 1990 draft by the Rangers, Weight played two seasons for the team before being traded to the Edmonton Oilers, where he recorded six 20-goal seasons and his only 100-point season in the 1995–96 season while being the captain of the team in his final two seasons. Traded from the Blues to the Hurricanes in the 2005–06 season, he recorded 16 points in 23 playoff games as Carolina won their first Stanley Cup in team history. He played the following five seasons with three more teams. A four-time selection to the All-Star Game, Weight was awarded the King Clancy Memorial Trophy in the 2010–11 season for his leadership qualities despite being plagued by back injuries that saw him play only 18 games; he retired after the season ended. Internationally, Weight represented United States for various international competitions, which saw them win the World Cup of Hockey in 1996 and finish with a silver medal at the 2002 Winter Olympics. A playmaking center, Weight recorded over 700 assists in 1,238 games. He was inducted into the United States Hockey Hall of Fame in 2013 and the Edmonton Oilers Hall of Fame in 2023.

After his playing career ended, Weight became an assistant coach and assistant general manager with the Islanders. In 2017, he was named interim coach and named head coach for the 2017–18 season, which saw him fired in June 2018, having coached 122 total games. In 2022, he was hired by the San Jose Sharks as their hockey operations adviser.

== Playing career ==
At the age of two, Wright recalled that his father put skates on him at the arena in St. Clair Shores, Michigan on the suggestion from a doctor to help straighten his legs, as Weight had a childhood condition that meant he had to wear braces on his legs.

As a youth, Weight played in the 1983 Quebec International Pee-Wee Hockey Tournament with the Detroit Compuware minor ice hockey team. He graduated in 1989 from Notre Dame High School in Harper Woods, Michigan. He was drafted by the Bloomfield Jets of the North American Junior Hockey League (now known as the NAHL). Weight led the NAJHL in scoring and was recruited by Lake Superior State University.

Weight played two years in the NCAA with LSSU from 1989 to 1991. He was drafted by the New York Rangers in the 1990 NHL entry draft with their second pick, 34th overall. After completing his second year with his college team, he played a single playoff game with the Rangers in 1991, then split time between the Rangers and their AHL affiliate the Binghamton Rangers. He played 65 games with the Rangers in his first full NHL season, 1992–93, before being traded to the Edmonton Oilers for forward Esa Tikkanen.

Weight played eight and a half seasons with the Oilers, secluding a stint with SB Rosenheim of the German Elite League (DEL) during the shortened 1994–95 NHL season, serving as their captain from 1999 to 2001. It was as an Oiler that he led Edmonton to five consecutive playoff appearances and scored a personal-best 104 points during the 1995–96 season. Due to Edmonton's financial situation, Weight was traded on July 1, 2001 to the St. Louis Blues, along with Michel Riesen, for forwards Marty Reasoner and Jochen Hecht, and defenseman Jan Horáček. In 2023, he was inducted into the Edmonton Oilers Hall of Fame.

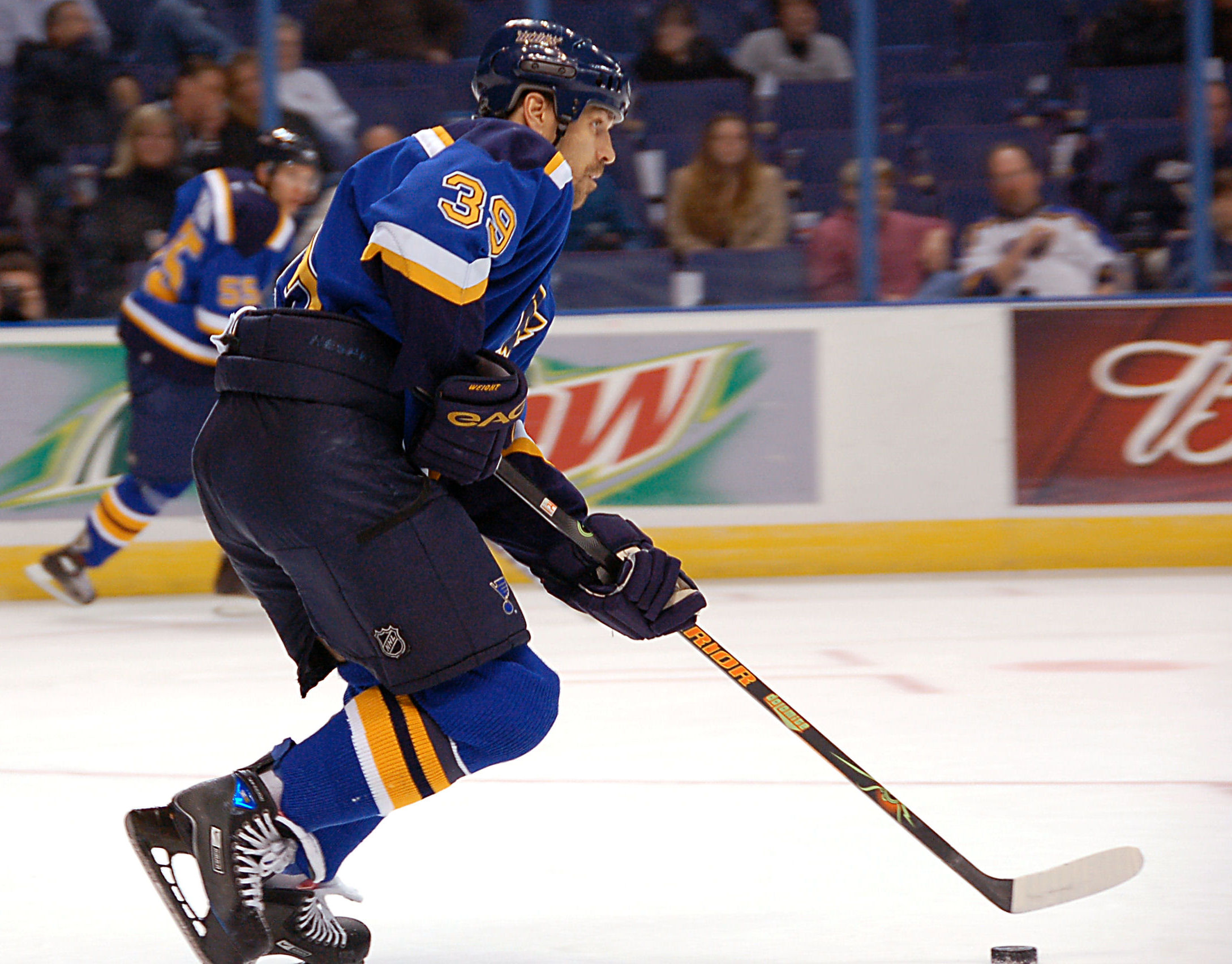
Weight with the St. Louis Blues in 2006

Weight spent the next three seasons with the Blues before returning to the DEL, due to the 2004 NHL Lockout, to play in the final stages of the 2004–05 season with the Frankfurt Lions. Upon the resumption of the NHL in the 2005–06 season, Weight returned to the Blues before he was traded after waiving a no-trade clause, along with the rights to Erkki Rajamaki, to the Carolina Hurricanes for Jesse Boulerice, Mike Zigomanis, the rights to Magnus Kahnberg and draft picks on January 30, 2006.

In the 2006 Stanley Cup Final against his former team, the Oilers, Weight and the Hurricanes suffered a blow during game five when he was sandwiched heavily along the boards by Raffi Torres and Chris Pronger in the second period of the game, which the Oilers won 4–3 in overtime on June 14, 2006. Weight missed the remainder of the Final with a separated shoulder injury. His place in the roster went to Erik Cole. When the Hurricanes won the Cup, Weight still cherished the chance to hold the Stanley Cup in celebration despite his sore shoulder. The Hurricanes won the Stanley Cup in seven games.

Weight then returned to the Blues as a free agent, signing a two-year contract on July 2, 2006. During the 2006–07 season, Weight played his 1,000th game against the Edmonton Oilers on November 17, 2006. With the Blues out of contention for the playoffs for the third season in a row, Weight was traded to the Anaheim Ducks for center Andy McDonald on December 14, 2007.

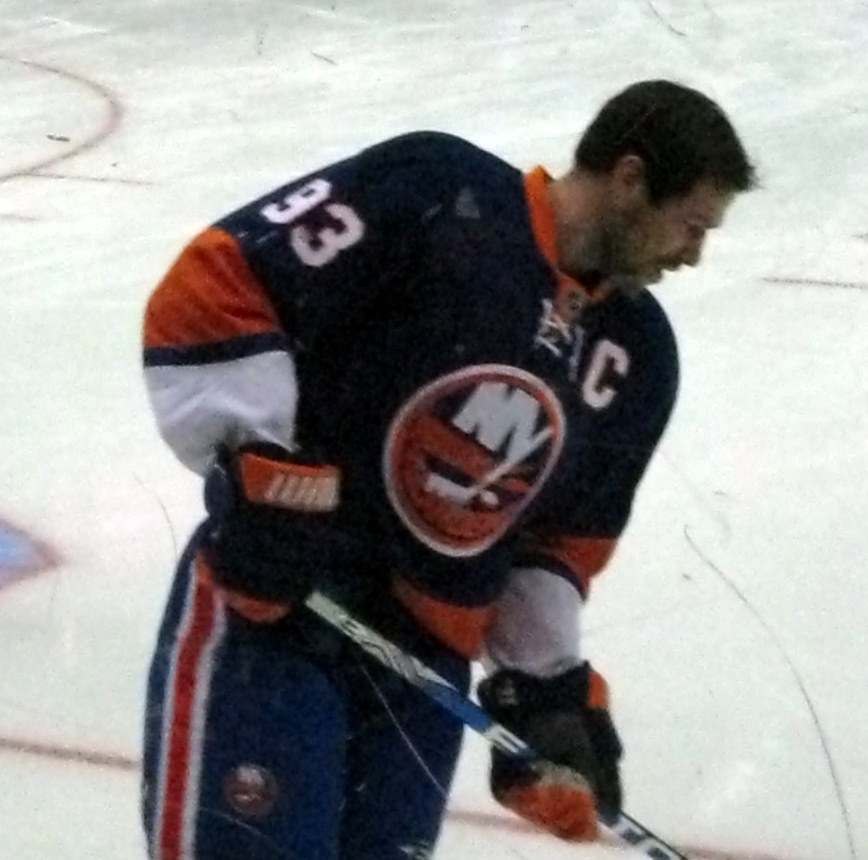
Doug Weight with the New York Islanders

On July 2, 2008, Weight was given a one-year contract by the rebuilding New York Islanders. On January 2, 2009, Weight registered his 1,000th point while playing for the Islanders, with an assist on a goal scored by Richard Park. At the end of the season, he was one of just 44 players with 700 assists and 1,000 points. Weight re-signed with the Islanders for the 2009–10 season. For his contributions to the community during the Islanders 2009-10 training camp held in Saskatoon, Saskatchewan, Canada, the baseball diamond at Wallace Park in Saskatoon was named in Weight's honor. He succeeded former longtime Oiler teammate Bill Guerin as captain of the Islanders on October 2, 2009. Despite missing a large portion of the season to various injuries and scoring 1 goal in 36 games, Weight was signed to a one-year extension with the Islanders on August 31, 2010.

After enduring a second consecutive year decimated by a lingering back injury, Weight announced his retirement following the 2010–11 season on May 26, 2011. With his retirement as a player from the game of hockey after 19 seasons in the NHL, it was immediately announced by the Islanders' general manager, Garth Snow, that Weight would continue with the organization as an assistant coach and special assistant to the general manager. Weight is ranked number seven out of all American players in points.

== Executive and coaching career ==
Weight became an assistant coach under then-head coach Jack Capuano in the 2011–12 season. On January 17, 2017, the Islanders fired Capuano and promoted Weight to interim coach. On April 12, 2017, Weight was officially named head coach after he led the team to a 24–12–4 record after taking the coaching duties in the middle of the season. On June 5, 2018, Weight was fired as head coach of the Islanders.

In 2022, he was hired by the San Jose Sharks as their hockey operations advisor under new general manager Mike Grier, who was a former teammate of Weight in Edmonton.

== International play ==
Weight played several times internationally for his country. He made three World Championship appearances for the United States in 1993, 1994 and 2005. He was a part of the silver medal winning team at the 2002 Winter Olympics in Salt Lake City, and also played with Team USA at the 1996 and 2004 World Cup of Hockey, and the 1998 Winter Olympics in Nagano. In his only junior tournament in the 1991 World Junior Championships, he had 5 goals and 14 assists in seven games for Team USA that set a single-tournament record for an American team player.

== Career statistics ==
=== Regular season and playoffs ===
			Regular season					Playoffs
Season	Team	League	GP	G	A	Pts	PIM	GP	G	A	Pts	PIM
1988–89	Bloomfield Jets	NAJHL	34	26	53	79	105	—	—	—	—	—
1989–90	Lake Superior State	CCHA	46	21	48	69	44	—	—	—	—	—
1990–91	Lake Superior State	CCHA	42	29	46	75	86	—	—	—	—	—
1990–91	New York Rangers	NHL	—	—	—	—	—	1	0	0	0	0
1991–92	Binghamton Rangers	AHL	9	3	14	17	2	4	1	4	5	6
1991–92	New York Rangers	NHL	53	8	22	30	23	7	2	2	4	0
1992–93	New York Rangers	NHL	65	15	25	40	55	—	—	—	—	—
1992–93	Edmonton Oilers	NHL	13	2	6	8	10	—	—	—	—	—
1993–94	Edmonton Oilers	NHL	84	24	50	74	47	—	—	—	—	—
1994–95	Star Bulls Rosenheim	DEL	8	2	3	5	18	—	—	—	—	—
1994–95	Edmonton Oilers	NHL	48	7	33	40	69	—	—	—	—	—
1995–96	Edmonton Oilers	NHL	82	25	79	104	95	—	—	—	—	—
1996–97	Edmonton Oilers	NHL	80	21	61	82	80	12	3	8	11	8
1997–98	Edmonton Oilers	NHL	79	26	44	70	69	12	2	7	9	14
1998–99	Edmonton Oilers	NHL	43	6	31	37	12	4	1	1	2	15
1999–2000	Edmonton Oilers	NHL	77	21	51	72	54	5	3	2	5	4
2000–01	Edmonton Oilers	NHL	82	25	65	90	91	6	1	5	6	17
2001–02	St. Louis Blues	NHL	61	15	34	49	40	10	1	1	2	4
2002–03	St. Louis Blues	NHL	70	15	52	67	52	7	5	8	13	2
2003–04	St. Louis Blues	NHL	75	14	51	65	37	5	2	1	3	6
2004–05	Frankfurt Lions	DEL	7	6	9	15	26	11	2	10	12	8
2005–06	St. Louis Blues	NHL	47	11	33	44	50	—	—	—	—	—
2005–06	Carolina Hurricanes	NHL	23	4	9	13	25	23	3	13	16	20
2006–07	St. Louis Blues	NHL	82	16	43	59	56	—	—	—	—	—
2007–08	St. Louis Blues	NHL	29	4	7	11	12	—	—	—	—	—
2007–08	Anaheim Ducks	NHL	38	6	8	14	20	5	0	1	1	4
2008–09	New York Islanders	NHL	53	10	28	38	55	—	—	—	—	—
2009–10	New York Islanders	NHL	36	1	16	17	8	—	—	—	—	—
2010–11	New York Islanders	NHL	18	2	7	9	10	—	—	—	—	—
NHL totals			1,238	278	755	1,033	970	97	23	49	72	94

=== International ===
Medal record

Men's ice hockey

Representing the United States

Olympic Games
Silver medal – second place	2002 Salt Lake City	

World Cup
Gold medal – first place	1996 United States	

Year	Team	Event	GP	G	A	Pts	PIM
1991	United States	WJC	7	5	14	19	4
1993	United States	WC	6	0	6	6	12
1994	United States	WC	8	0	4	4	16
1996	United States	WCH	7	3	4	7	12
1998	United States	OG	4	0	2	2	2
2002	United States	OG	6	0	3	3	4
2004	United States	WCH	5	1	0	1	4
2005	United States	WC	7	1	5	6	0
2006	United States	OG	6	0	3	3	4
Senior totals			49	5	27	32	54

== Head coaching record ==
Team	Year	Regular season						Postseason
Team	Year	Games	Won	Lost	OTL	Points	Finish	Result
NYI	2016–17	40	24	12	4	(52)	5th in Metropolitan	Missed playoffs
NYI	2017–18	82	35	37	10	80	7th in Metropolitan	Missed playoffs
Total		122	59	49	14	132		

== Awards and honors ==
Award	Year	Ref
College
All-CCHA Rookie Team	1989-90	
All-CCHA First Team	1990-91	
AHCA West Second-Team All-American	1990–91	
CCHA All-Tournament Team	1991	
NHL
All-Star Game	1996, 1998, 2001, 2003	
Stanley Cup champion	2006	
King Clancy Memorial Trophy	2011	
United States Hockey Hall of Fame	2013	

Sporting positions
Preceded by Kelly Buchberger	Edmonton Oilers captain 1999–2001	Succeeded by Jason Smith
Preceded by Bill Guerin	New York Islanders captain 2009–11	Succeeded by Mark Streit
Preceded by Jack Capuano	Head coach of the New York Islanders; 2017–18	Succeeded by Barry Trotz
Awards and achievements
Preceded by Shane Doan	King Clancy Memorial Trophy; 2011	Succeeded by Daniel Alfredsson
