= Patrick Roy =

Canadian ice hockey player (born 1965)

- Hockey Hall of Fame, 2006
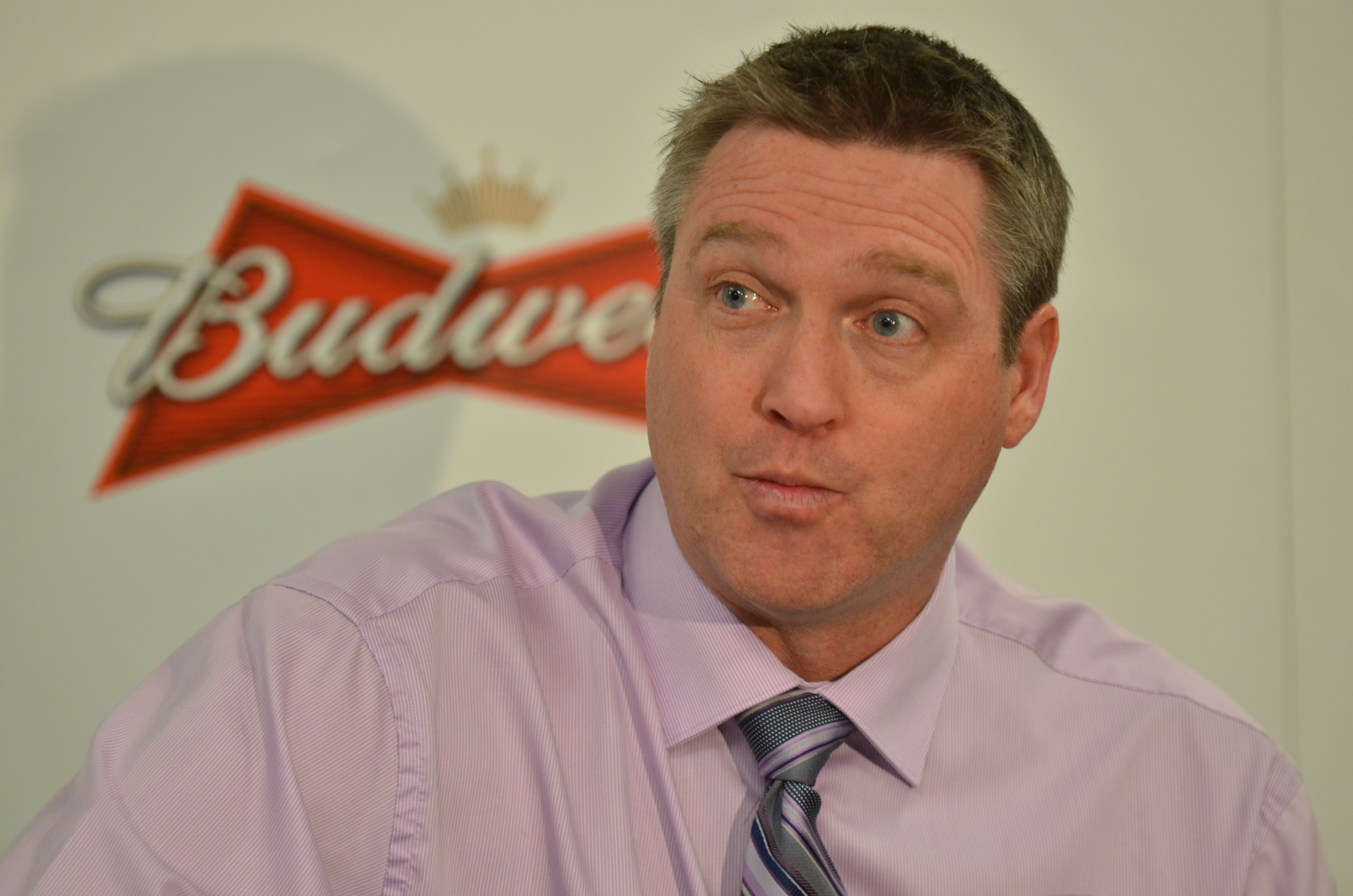
- Roy during his stint with the Quebec Remparts in 2012
- Born: October 5, 1965 (age 61) Quebec City, Quebec, Canada
- Height: 6 ft 2 in (188 cm)
- Weight: 190 lb (86 kg; 13 st 8 lb)
- Position: Goaltender
- Caught: Left
- Played for: Montreal Canadiens; Colorado Avalanche
- Coached for: Colorado Avalanche; New York Islanders
- National team: Canada
- NHL draft: 51st overall, 1984; Montreal Canadiens
- Playing career: 1984–2003
- Coaching career: 2005–present

Patrick Jacques Roy (French pronunciation: [ʁwa]; born October 5, 1965) is a Canadian professional ice hockey coach, executive, and former player who most recently was the head coach for the New York Islanders of the National Hockey League (NHL). Roy was hailed in sports media as "king of goaltenders" and was named one of the 100 Greatest NHL Players in history in 2017. Nicknamed "Saint Patrick", he split his playing career in the National Hockey League (NHL) between the Montreal Canadiens, with whom he played for 11 years, and the Colorado Avalanche, with whom he played for eight years. Roy won the Stanley Cup four times during his career, two with each franchise.

In 2004, Roy was selected as the greatest goaltender in NHL history by a panel of 41 writers, coupled with a simultaneous fan poll. On November 13, 2006, Roy was inducted into the Hockey Hall of Fame. He is the only player in NHL history to win the Conn Smythe Trophy (the award given to the Most Valuable Player in the Stanley Cup playoffs) three times, the only one to do so in three different decades (1980s, 1990s, and 2000s), and the only one to do so for two different teams. Roy's number 33 sweater is retired by both the Canadiens and Avalanche.

Roy is widely credited with popularizing the butterfly style of goaltending, which has since become the dominant style of goaltending around the world.

After retiring, Roy was head coach for the Colorado Avalanche of the NHL, as well as the Quebec Remparts of the Quebec Major Junior Hockey League (QMJHL). He then served as head coach of the Islanders from January 2024 until April 2026.

== Early life ==
Roy was born in Quebec City but grew up in Cap-Rouge, Quebec. His parents are Barbara (Miller) and Michel Roy, and he has a younger brother, Stéphane. Roy became interested in being an ice hockey goaltender when he was seven years old, idolizing Rogie Vachon and Dan Bouchard. He played in the 1977 and 1978 Quebec International Pee-Wee Hockey Tournaments on a minor ice hockey team from Quebec City, which included his brother in 1978. After playing for the local Sainte-Foy Gouverneurs, he played for the Granby Bisons of the QMJHL (Quebec Major Junior Hockey League).

== Playing career ==
=== Montreal Canadiens (1984–1995) ===
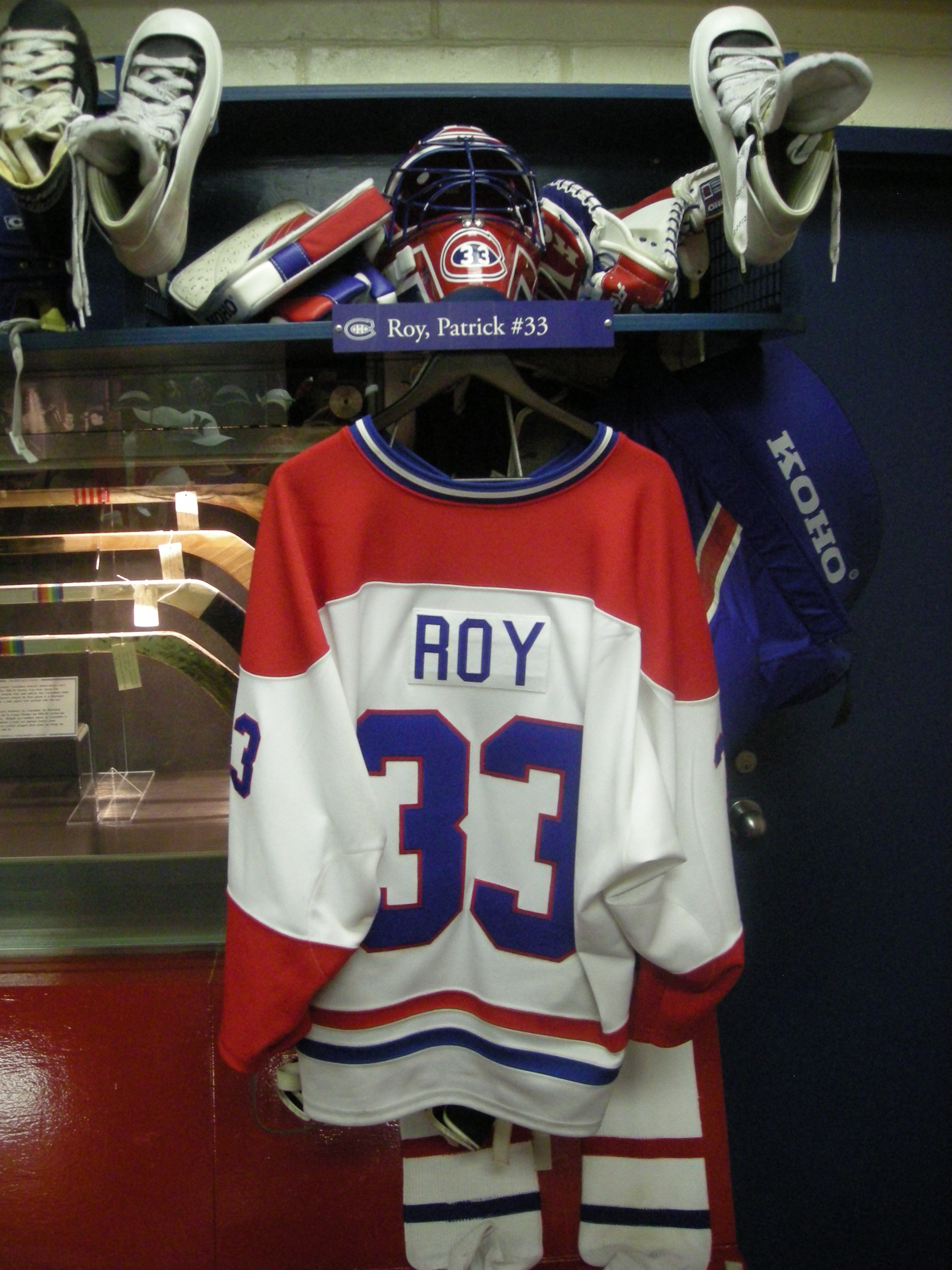
A replica of Roy's mask and jersey during his time with the Montreal Canadiens, on display in the Hockey Hall of Fame

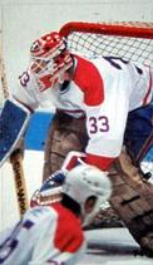
Roy in action in 1987 for Montreal Canadiens

Roy was drafted in the third round as the 51st overall pick in the 1984 NHL entry draft by the Montreal Canadiens; ironically, he actually was not a fan of the Canadiens, as he was a fan of the rival Quebec Nordiques. His grandmother Anna Peacock was a big Canadiens fan, but died before seeing her grandson being drafted. Roy kept playing for the Granby Bisons of the Quebec Major Junior Hockey League (QMJHL) before being called up by the Canadiens. Despite the thoughts that he was not going to play for the team, on February 23, 1985, he made his NHL debut when he replaced the Canadiens' starting goaltender, Doug Soetaert, in the game's third period. Roy played for 20 minutes and earned his first NHL win without allowing a goal. After the game, he was reassigned to the Sherbrooke Canadiens of the AHL. Despite starting as a backup, Roy replaced Greg Moffett after he had equipment troubles during a game. He earned a win, became the starting goaltender for the playoffs and led the team to a Calder Cup championship with ten wins in 13 games.

In the following season, Roy started playing regularly for the Canadiens and took over the starting goaltender's job when incumbent Steve Penney was injured in January. He played 47 games during the regular season and won the starting job for the Stanley Cup playoffs, where he emerged as a star, leading his team to an unexpected Stanley Cup title and winning the Conn Smythe Trophy for the Most Valuable Player in the playoffs. As a 20-year-old, he became the youngest Conn Smythe winner ever and was chosen for the NHL All-Rookie Team.

Nicknamed St. Patrick after the victory, Roy continued playing for the Canadiens, who won the Adams Division in 1987–88 and in 1988–89, when they lost to the Calgary Flames in the Stanley Cup Final. Roy, together with Brian Hayward, won the William M. Jennings Trophy in 1987, 1988, and 1989, as the Canadiens regularly allowed the fewest goals against. In 1989 and 1990, he won the Vezina Trophy for best goaltender in the NHL and was voted for the NHL first All-Star team. In 1991–92, the Canadiens won the Adams Division again, with Roy having a very successful individual year, winning the William M. Jennings Trophy, and Vezina Trophy and being selected for the NHL's first All-Star team. Despite the successful regular season, the Canadiens were swept in the second round by the Boston Bruins, who stopped their playoff run for the fourth time in five years.

In the 1992–93 season, the Canadiens fell from first overall in March to finish the regular season third in their division behind title winner Boston Bruins and a resurgent second-place Quebec Nordiques. During the first round of the 1993 playoffs against the archrival Nordiques, Roy was in a goaltending duel against Ron Hextall; Hextall was also a Vezina and Conn Smythe winner with his previous team, the Philadelphia Flyers, when they had several ill-tempered postseason encounters with Roy's Canadiens in the 1980s. The Canadiens lost the first two games of the series with Roy letting in soft goals, and a newspaper in Roy's hometown district suggested that he be traded with the headline "NORDIQUES WIN GAME, BATTLE OF GOALIES," while the subhead added (Quebec goaltender Ron) "HEXTALL GETS BETTER OF ROY." Nordiques goaltending coach Dan Bouchard also proclaimed that his team had "solved Roy." These comments seemed to fire up Roy, who responded by winning the next four games against the Nordiques (Roy was replaced for part of Game Five by backup André Racicot after being struck by a puck in the collarbone), sweeping the Buffalo Sabres in the next round and winning the first three against the New York Islanders to tie the record of an 11-game playoff winning streak. Roy also set a record with ten straight playoff overtime wins – two against Quebec, three against Buffalo, two against the New York Islanders (where he denied Benoît Hogue and Pierre Turgeon on breakaways during overtime), and three against the Los Angeles Kings in the Stanley Cup Final. Roy had led his team, which did not have a player that finished in the top twenty regular season scoring, to the Stanley Cup championship and was named the Conn Smythe Trophy winner.

In 1994, the Canadiens were the defending champions but they were knocked out in the first round by the Boston Bruins. Nonetheless, that seven-game series was notable in the eyes of Montreal fans as Roy came down with appendicitis and missed game 3. He convinced doctors to let him return for game 4 and led the Canadiens to a 5–2 victory, stopping 39 shots. Roy was a finalist for the Vezina Trophy, finishing third in voting behind winner Dominik Hašek and runner-up John Vanbiesbrouck.

==== Final season with Montreal and trade ====
A disastrous start to the 1995–96 season after four games, as well as missing the 1995 playoffs, led to Canadiens' team president Ronald Corey making a major management shakeup or "house cleaning". Head coach Jacques Demers was fired and Mario Tremblay was hired despite having no previous coaching experience. Likewise, longtime general manager Serge Savard was also let go and replaced by the inexperienced Réjean Houle. Roy and Tremblay, who had roomed together while teammates, had since developed a strained relationship, with Tremblay regularly mocking Roy for speaking broken English. Roy was a frequent target of Tremblay during the latter's sports radio career. The two had almost come to blows in two incidents in 1995, one at a Long Island coffee shop before Tremblay was announced as head coach, and Roy snickered when Tremblay arrived in the dressing room for the first time. They almost fought again after Tremblay allegedly fired a shot at Roy's throat during practice.

On December 2, 1995, in his 22nd game (and the team's 24th) of the 1995–96 season, Roy was in net against the Detroit Red Wings during Montreal's worst home game in franchise history, an 11–1 loss. Roy allowed nine goals on 26 shots, which was highly unusual, as star goaltenders are generally taken out of the game quickly when it is clear they are struggling. During the second period, when Montreal was trailing 7–1 in the game, the crowd provided mock applause after Roy made an easy save on Sergei Fedorov from centre ice, prompting him to sarcastically raise his arms in mock celebration. Tremblay finally pulled Roy in the middle of the second period in favour of Pat Jablonski.

During Molson Breweries' tenure as owner of the team, the rows of seats immediately behind the Canadiens' bench were under the exclusive control of Molson and as such were typically reserved for the use of executives of the Canadiens, Molson, or invited dignitaries. Since these seats were not available to the public, the standard glass partitions that separate hockey spectators from the team benches were not installed behind the home bench of the Forum. Because of this unusual arrangement, an enraged Roy had no time to regain his composure before approaching the team's top brass who were in attendance and their usual seats. Upon reaching the bench, Roy immediately stormed past his coach and told Canadiens President Ronald Corey "It's my last game in Montreal". The next day, Roy was suspended by the Canadiens.

At the time, Tremblay told the media that he regretted not pulling Roy earlier in the game, but Roy later said that despite allowing five goals on 17 shots in the first, Tremblay kept him in the net to humiliate him. In later interviews, Roy cited a general distaste with what he thought was a loosening of standards with the team.

Four days after the incident, the Canadiens traded Roy and captain Mike Keane to the Colorado Avalanche in exchange for Jocelyn Thibault, Martin Ručinský and Andrei Kovalenko. The return for Roy was seen as uneven at the time it was made and eventually became known as one of the most one-sided deals in NHL history. Canadiens general manager Réjean Houle had been in his post for only 40 days and faced criticism for making the trade instead of trying to resolve the tension between Roy and Tremblay.

=== Colorado Avalanche (1996–2003) ===
In the 1995–96 season, after his mid-season trade from the Canadiens, Roy helped the Avalanche win their first Stanley Cup in their first season after moving from Quebec. Colorado's successful playoff run included upsetting the Presidents' Trophy-winning Detroit Red Wings in the Western Conference finals, the same team that had defeated Roy 11–1 in his last game with the Canadiens. Roy was a runner-up for the Vezina Trophy to Jim Carey.

In the 1996 Western Conference semifinals against the Chicago Blackhawks, Jeremy Roenick was stopped by Roy on a breakaway during overtime in game four, while being hauled down by Avalanche defenceman Sandis Ozolinsh. The referee did not call for a penalty shot on the play and the Avalanche won in triple overtime on Joe Sakic's game-winning goal. Two days prior, Roenick had scored on an unchallenged breakaway to tie the game and send it to overtime, and the Blackhawks ended up winning game three. After game four, Roenick told the media, "It should have been a penalty shot, there's no doubt about it. I like Patrick's quote that he would've stopped me. I'd just want to know where he was in game three, probably getting his jock out of the rafters in the United Center maybe." Roy retorted with: "I can't really hear what Jeremy says, because I've got my two Stanley Cup rings plugging my ears." Roy and the Avalanche beat the Blackhawks in six games and went on to win the Stanley Cup.

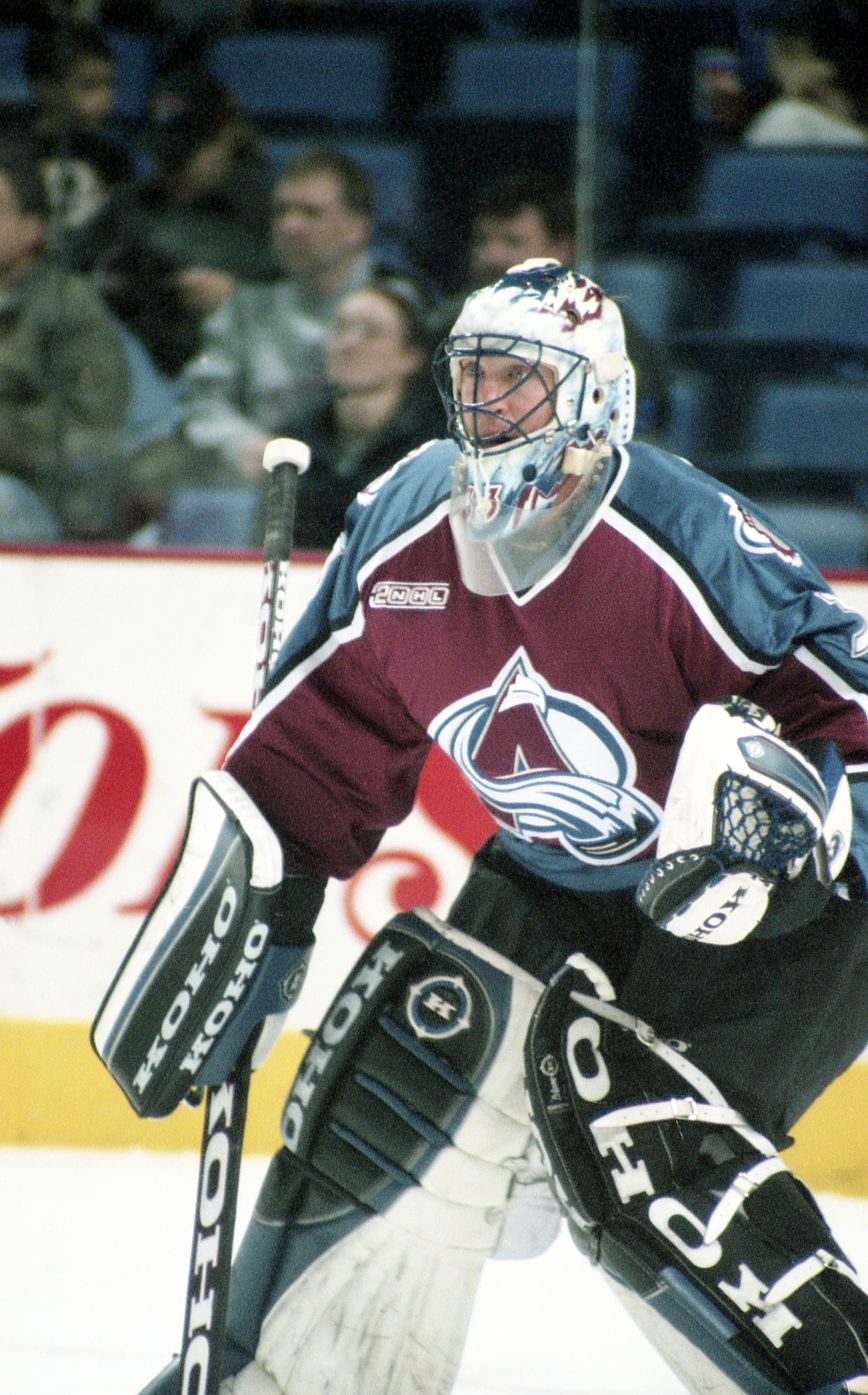
Roy in net for the Avalanche during the 1999–2000 season

Roy was a large part of the Avalanche–Red Wings rivalry, which also involved players Adam Foote and Brendan Shanahan, among others. The Avalanche and Red Wings met in the playoffs five times from 1996 to 2002, with the Avs winning in 1996, 1999, and 2000. The heated competition between teams is linked to the 11–1 Montreal loss to Detroit that precipitated Roy's midseason trade to Colorado in December 1995, and in that season's 1996 conference finals Roy helped his new team eliminate first-place Detroit. During the Avalanche–Red Wings brawl in 1997, he fought the Wings' goaltender Mike Vernon. The next season, he fought another Red Wings goaltender, Chris Osgood. In what would be Roy's final playoff meeting with Detroit, he was pulled after allowing six goals in game seven of the 2002 Western Conference finals, a game Detroit won 7–0 to advance to the Stanley Cup Final.

In 2000–01, Roy's Avalanche won the Presidents' Trophy for the best regular season record. In the playoffs, his team advanced to the Stanley Cup Final, where they faced the defending champion New Jersey Devils, who were backstopped by Martin Brodeur, a star netminder who had idolized Roy as a child. Roy started off the series strong, recording a shutout in a 5–0 victory in game one for Colorado. In game four, while playing the puck behind his net, Roy could not make a clearing pass, allowing the Devils to score into an empty net to tie the game. Roy had his worst game of the Cup Final in a 4–1 home loss during game five, which gave the Devils a 3–2 series lead. Roy rebounded in game six at New Jersey by stopping 24 shots for his then-record 19th career playoff shutout in a 4–0 victory. The Avalanche jumped to a three-goal lead in game seven before conceding one consolation goal to win their second Stanley Cup. Roy was named playoff MVP for the third time in his career, an NHL record. Roy has said that he and his teammates had wanted to win it for Ray Bourque, who finally won his first Cup after 22 seasons in the NHL; Bourque who had previously played 21 seasons with the Boston Bruins had numerous playoff encounters against Roy when he was with the Canadiens. Rob Blake also won his first Cup after joining the Avalanche in a midseason trade; Blake had previously played for the Kings and had faced Roy's Canadiens in the 1993 Stanley Cup Final.

Roy's final game was played against the Minnesota Wild on April 22, 2003, in a game seven overtime loss in the first round of the 2003 playoffs.

Patrick Roy announced his retirement on May 28, 2003.

== International play ==
Roy was selected as Canada's starting goaltender for the 1998 Winter Olympics, alongside Martin Brodeur and Curtis Joseph, the first Olympics in which the NHL took a break to allow its players to participate. Roy played all six games, but heavily favoured Canada did not reach the gold medal game after being eliminated by the Czech Republic in the semifinal. Roy and his Czech counterpart Hašek both had save percentages above .950 entering the semifinal, and regulation ended in a 1–1 tie. After a scoreless overtime, the Czechs beat Canada 1–0 in the tiebreaking shootout, with Roy being beaten by Robert Reichel, then saving from Martin Ručinský and Pavel Patera, followed by Jaromír Jágr hitting the post, while Hašek stopped all five Canadian shots. After the loss, their first of the tournament, the Canadians could not regain momentum for the bronze medal game and subsequently lost 3–2 to Finland, denying Roy his only chance at an Olympic medal. Roy had a 4–2 record with one shutout while averaging 1.46 goals against per game and stopping .935 percent of total shots faced.

Roy declined the opportunity to play for Canada at the 2002 Winter Olympics before the team's selection took place.

== Post-playing career ==
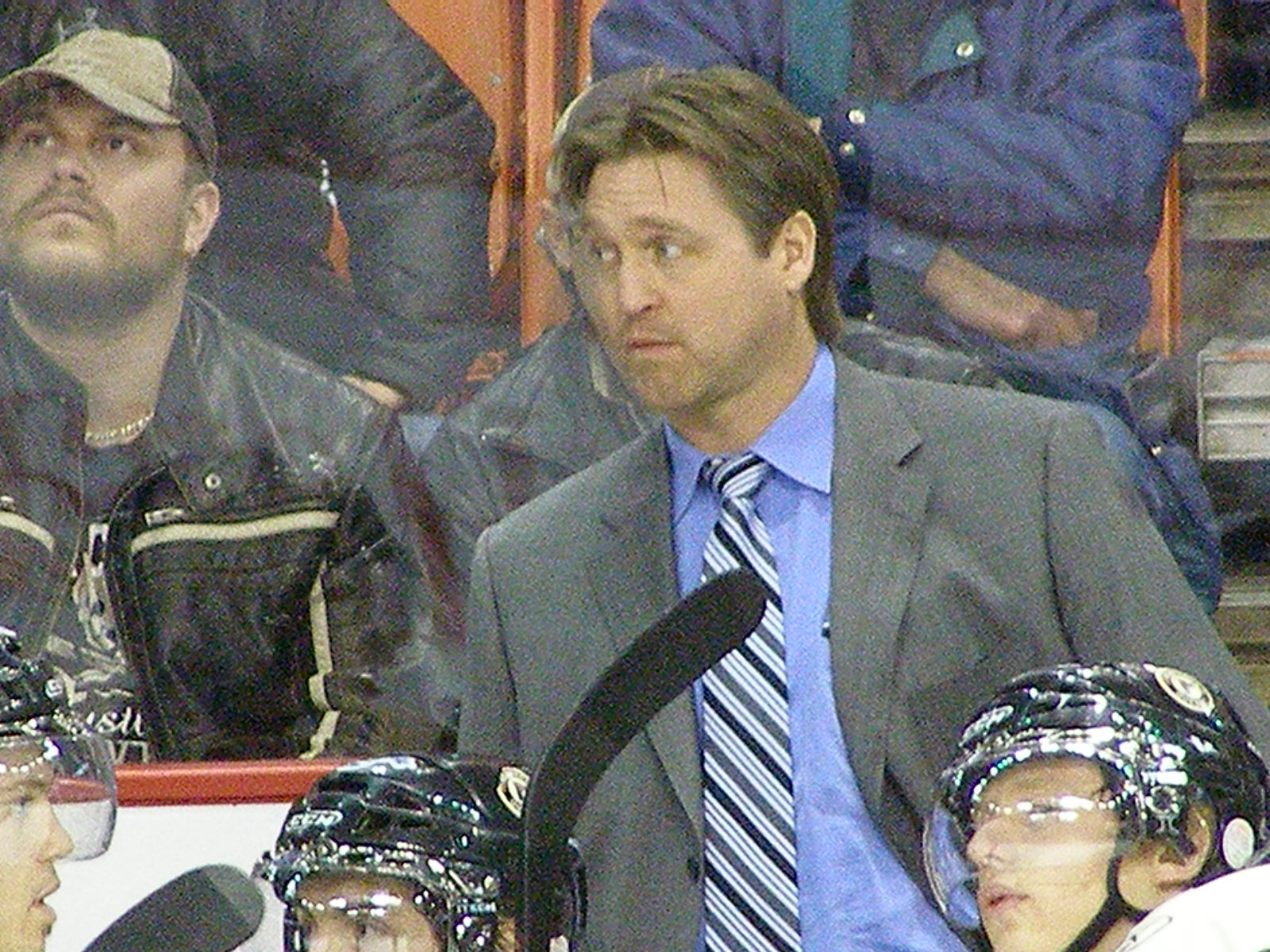
Roy behind the bench as the head coach of the Quebec Remparts during a game in 2009

After retiring from the NHL, Roy joined the Quebec Remparts of the Quebec Major Junior Hockey League (QMJHL) as vice-president of hockey operations; he also became the owner and general manager, and on September 29, 2005, he was named head coach of the team.

On May 28, 2006, the Remparts won the 2006 Memorial Cup, the top Canadian Hockey League (CHL) tournament, beating the Moncton Wildcats 6–2 in the finals (although the Remparts were only the runner-up in the 2006 QMJHL championship, they were able to participate in the Memorial Cup since the QMJHL champions were the host city—see Memorial Cup, 1983 to present). Roy is the seventh coach to win the Cup in his rookie year, and the first to do so since Claude Julien with the Hull Olympiques in 1997.

On January 19, 2007, Saguenay Police investigated an incident involving Roy and the co-owner of the Chicoutimi Saguenéens, Pierre Cardinal. There were reports that Roy threw punches at the co-owner after he intervened to disperse a crowd of hockey fans that were blocking the Remparts' bus after a game between the two clubs. A complaint for assault had been filed against Roy, who faced possible assault charges in the matter. Montreal newspaper Le Journal de Montréal reported that Roy later apologized to the victim via telephone. In a press conference following a Remparts game on January 21, 2007, Roy said that he was "suffering prejudice on the part of the media," and believed that he was not guilty of the incident. He then questioned his future as head coach and co-owner of the team, even considering resigning from his duties. On January 25, 2007, Pierre Cardinal announced that he removed his complaint against Roy before Roy made a press conference about his future in the Remparts, where he announced he will stay coach and co-owner of the team.

On March 22, 2008, in Chicoutimi, Quebec, Roy was involved in another on-ice incident during game two of a first-round playoff series against the rival Saguenéens. Late in the second period, in which the Saguenéens were leading 7–1, a brawl started and Remparts goaltender Jonathan Roy, Roy's son, charged towards opposing goaltender Bobby Nadeau. Jonathan hit Nadeau numerous times despite Nadeau indicating he did not want to fight. After knocking Nadeau down, Jonathan continued to hit Nadeau. Jonathan then fought a second Saguenéens player before skating off the ice while holding both middle fingers up to the crowd. Roy denied inciting his son Jonathan to fight, despite video evidence showing Roy making a gesture towards his son while he was advancing towards Nadeau. After an investigation by the League office, Patrick Roy was suspended for five games and fined $4,000, while his son Jonathan was suspended for seven games and fined $500. The Quebec Ministry of Public Safety has launched a police investigation into the matter. In late July 2008, Jonathan was charged with assault in Saguenay courts.

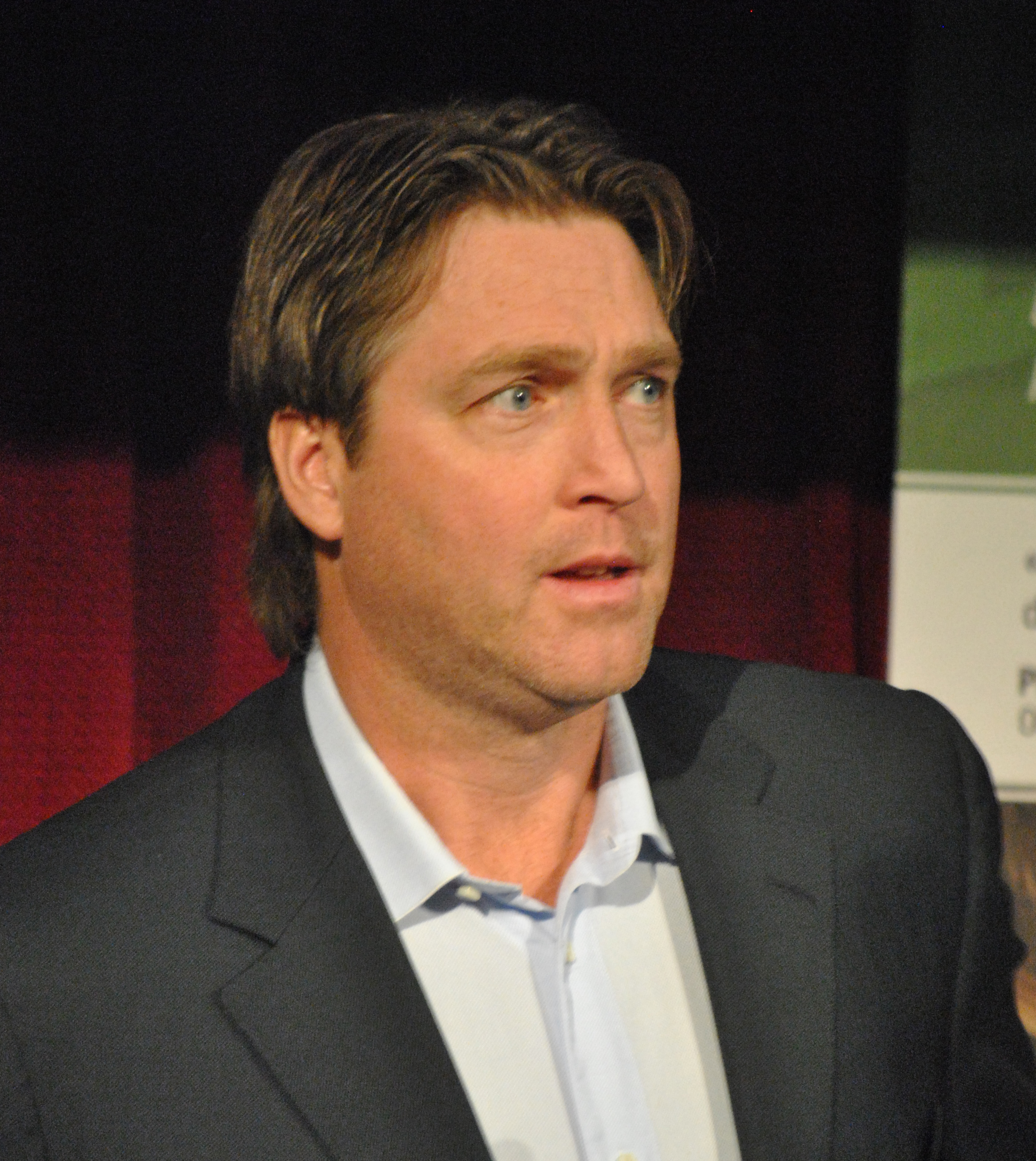
Roy in 2010

On November 21, 2008, Roy's other son, Frederick Roy, found trouble playing for the Remparts when he cross-checked an opponent in the head after a stoppage in play. Frederick was ultimately suspended 15 games by the QMJHL for the incident, which occurred the night before Patrick Roy's jersey retirement ceremony in Montreal.

In May 2009, several unnamed sources reported that Roy was offered the head coaching position with the Colorado Avalanche. He turned down the position, but expressed the possibility of becoming an NHL-level coach at some future date.

In September 2012, Roy started a new chapter in his career by becoming a permanent member of the French–Canadian hockey talk show l'Antichambre, where he worked as a hockey analyst. He was reunited on the set with his former head coach, Mario Tremblay.

In January 2024, it was announced that Roy, in partnership with Canadian businessmen Jean Bédard and Jacques Tanguay (a former owner of the Remparts), had purchased a minority stake in Boxers de Bordeaux, a professional team playing in the French Ligue Magnus.

=== NHL coaching career ===
==== Colorado Avalanche (2013–2016) ====
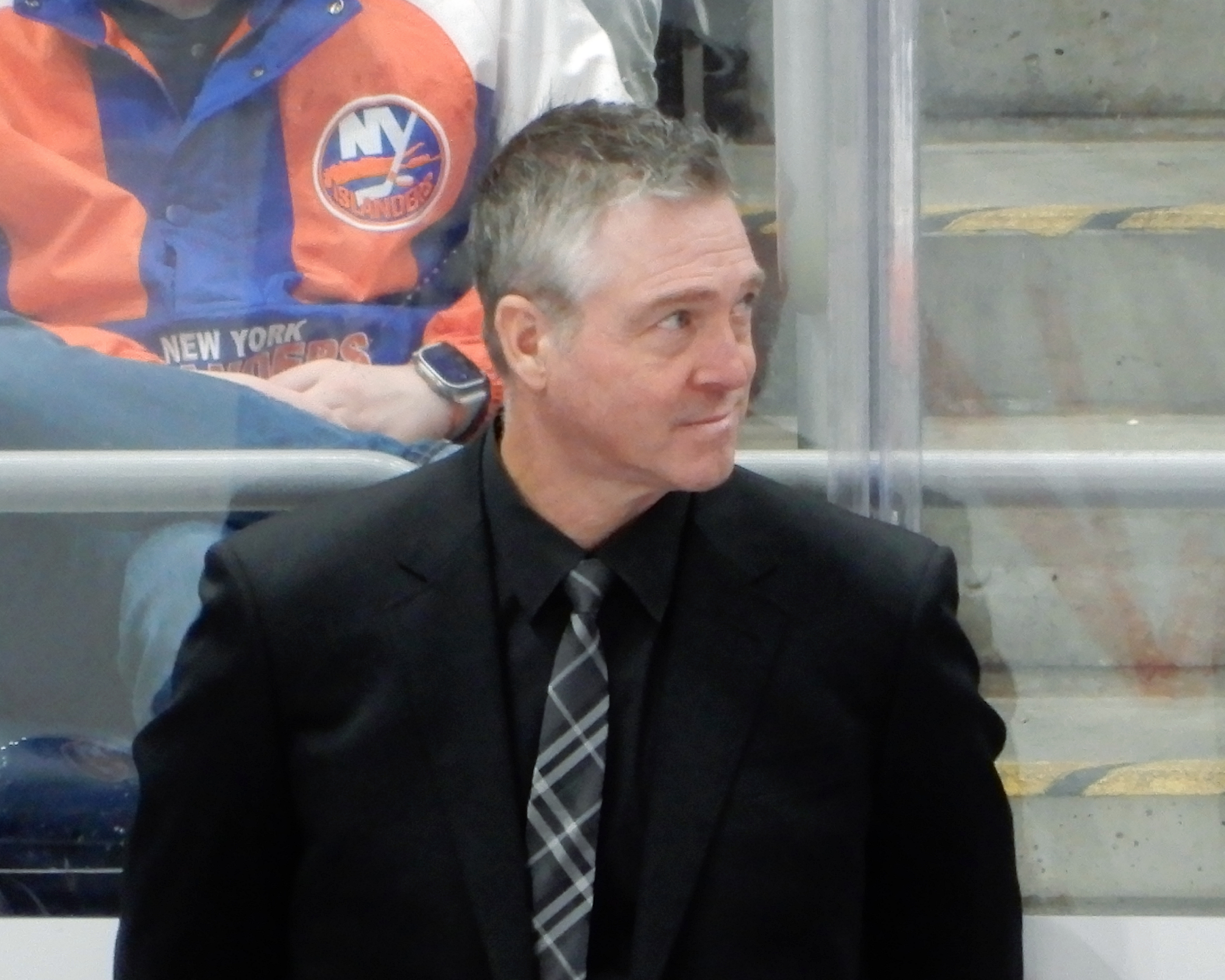
Roy behind the bench as the head coach of the New York Islanders during a game in 2024

On May 23, 2013, Roy was named head coach and vice-president of hockey operations of the Colorado Avalanche. TSN's Bob McKenzie reported that Roy would have the final say in all hockey matters. Those powers were formerly held by Avalanche general manager Greg Sherman, who nonetheless retained his post despite losing responsibilities. At the time, Roy was the only coach in the NHL who had the title or powers of general manager. Before the season started, his former Avs teammate, Joe Sakic, was hired as executive vice president of hockey operations. Although the title nominally put him above Roy on the organization chart, Roy and Sakic shared most of the duties normally held by a general manager in the NHL–a practice that continued after Sakic was formally granted the title of general manager in 2014.

Roy's first regular season game with the Colorado Avalanche as coach was the home opener on October 2, 2013, a 6–1 win over the Anaheim Ducks, where Roy got into a shouting match with Ducks head coach Bruce Boudreau and nearly broke the partition separating the two teams' benches. Roy won his first six games as a rookie coach, coincidentally tying Mario Tremblay, his former coach with whom he had a feuding relationship, for the most consecutive wins at the beginning of an NHL coaching career.

In the 2013–14 season, Colorado racked up 112 points, won the Central Division title, tied a franchise record with 52 wins, posted the NHL's best road record (26–11–4) and had zero regulation losses when leading after two periods (35–0–3). For his team's success, Roy won the Jack Adams Award for the NHL's top coach, winning the honour over the Detroit Red Wings' Mike Babcock and the Tampa Bay Lightning's Jon Cooper.

During the 2014 Stanley Cup playoffs, Roy became known for aggressively pulling goaltender Semyon Varlamov to set up a 6-on-5, empty-net scenario, sometimes with as much as three minutes remaining in the game. However, the heavily favoured second seeded Avalanche ultimately lost in the first round to the seventh seeded Minnesota Wild at home in game seven. The following season, the Avalanche regressed significantly, finishing last (seventh) in their division and sixth in the following season.

On August 11, 2016, Roy, citing a lack of input in personnel decisions, stepped down as the head coach and vice-president of hockey operations for the Avalanche, and was subsequently replaced by Jared Bednar.

==== New York Islanders (2024–2026) ====
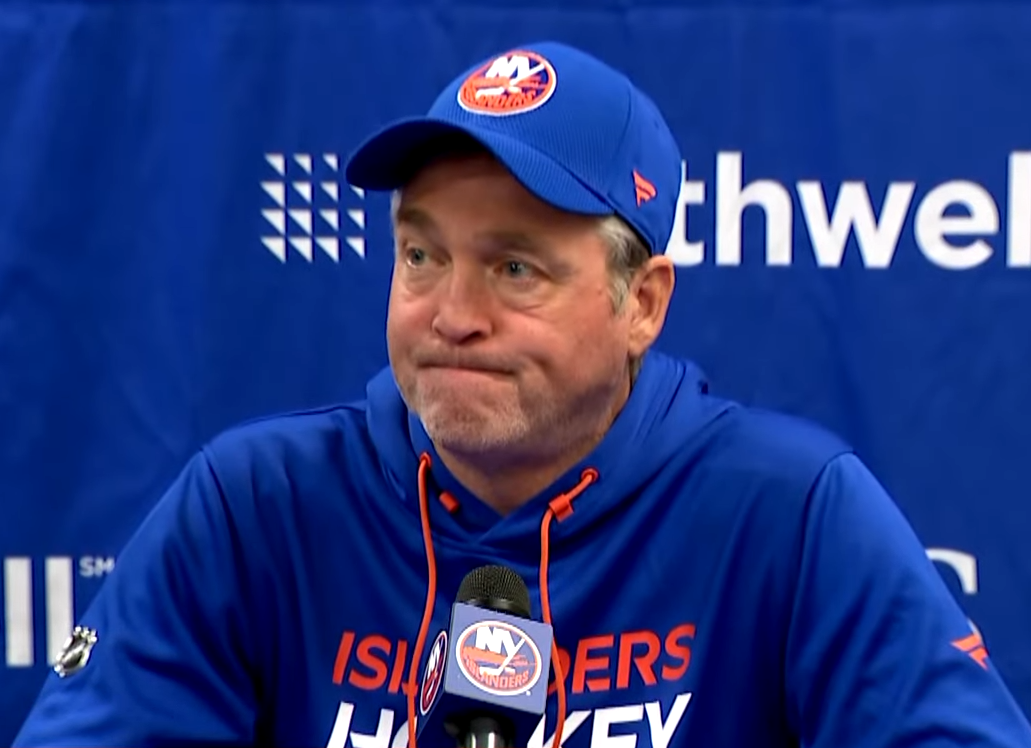
Roy in 2024 as head coach of the New York Islanders

On January 20, 2024, the New York Islanders fired Lane Lambert as head coach and named Roy as his successor. He made his Islanders debut on January 21, and earned his first win as Islanders head coach with a 3–2 overtime victory over the Dallas Stars.

On April 5, 2026, the New York Islanders fired Roy and named Peter DeBoer as his successor, with only four games remaining in the 2025–26 season.

== Personal life ==
Patrick Roy married Michèle Piuze on June 9, 1990. They have three children – Jonathan, Frederick and Jana. His sons, Frederick and Jonathan, played for the Quebec Remparts during Roy's tenure as head coach of the team. His son Jonathan has since left ice hockey to pursue a music career.

While playing for the Avalanche, Patrick Roy was arrested for domestic violence on October 22, 2000, and was released on $750 bail. Roy and his wife were in an argument, and his wife made a hangup call to 911. Police found physical damage to the house and took Roy into custody. The presiding judge dismissed the case, citing it did not meet the standard for criminal mischief in a case of domestic violence. Roy and Piuze divorced in early 2005; Roy has not remarried.

Since the 1980s, Roy has been a significant contributor to the Ronald McDonald House charity.

Roy was known for superstitious quirks. He often talked to the net posts, and he never talked to reporters on days in which he was scheduled to play. He also refused to let his skates touch the red and blue lines on the ice, stepping over them.

== Legacy ==
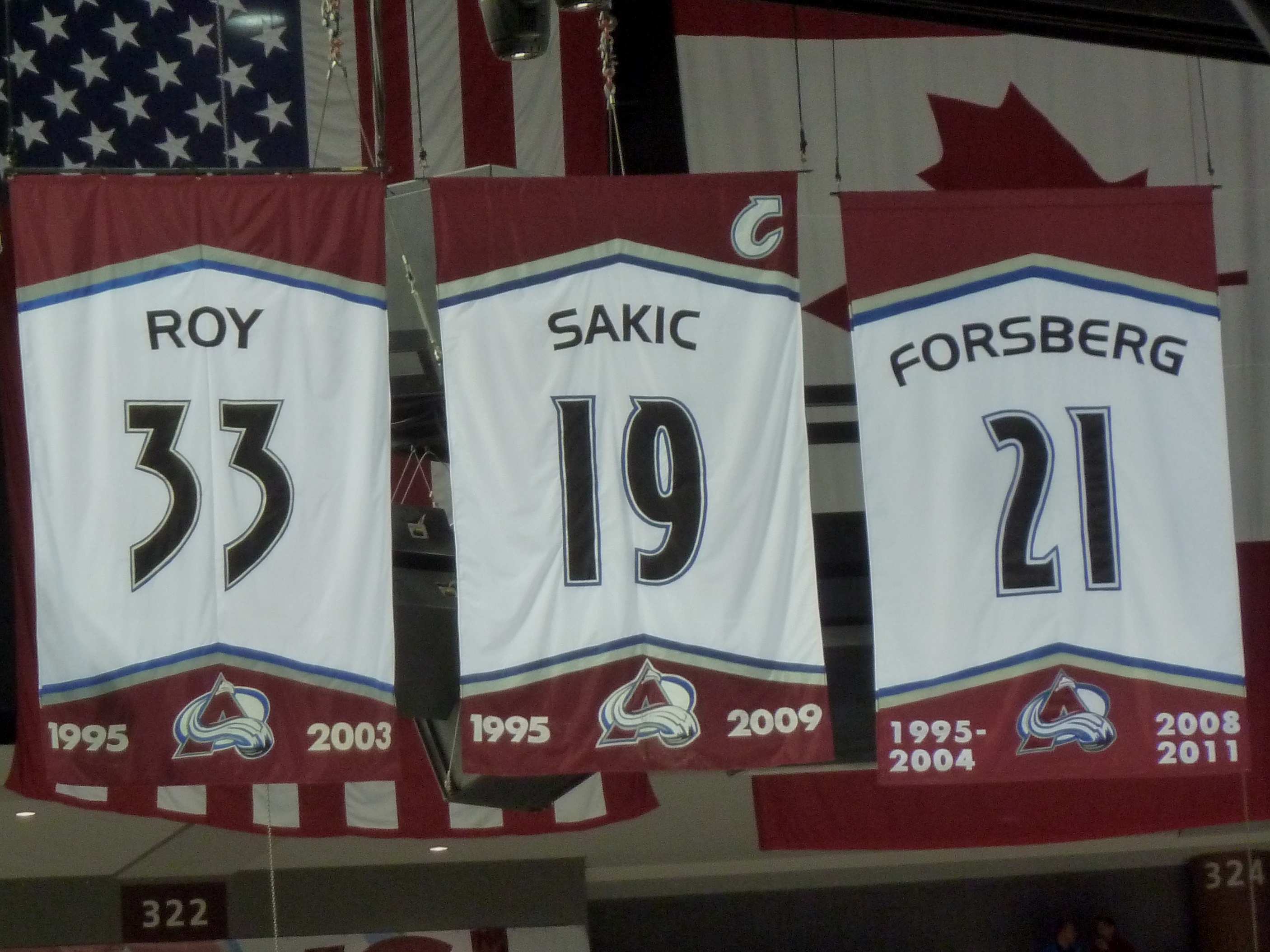
A banner with Roy's number 33 hung alongside other banners of retired numbers with the Avalanche

In 1989, 1990, and 1992, Roy won the Vezina Trophy as the NHL's best goaltender. He won the Jennings Trophy (fewest goals allowed) in 1987, 1988, 1989 (all shared with Brian Hayward), 1992 and 2002. He led the NHL in shutouts and goals against average twice, was named a First Team All-Star four times, a Second Team All-Star twice, and played in 11 National Hockey League All-Star Games. Roy has also won a record three Conn Smythe Trophies as NHL playoff MVP (1986, 1993 and 2001). Among the many goaltending NHL records Roy holds are career playoff games played (247) and career playoff wins (151).

The Avalanche retired Roy's number 33 jersey on October 28, 2003, while the Montreal Canadiens retired Roy's number 33 on November 22, 2008. This made Roy the sixth NHL player to have his number retired by two organizations. Roy was elected to the Hockey Hall of Fame in 2006, his first year of eligibility. Roy won over 200 games with both franchises.

Along with Terry Sawchuk, Roy is directly credited with inspiring the jersey numbers that NHL goaltenders use; both are cited as the primary reason goaltenders have come to choose numbers in the 30s since their respective careers.

British Columbia-born baseball player and former American League MVP Justin Morneau wore number 33 in tribute to Roy.

== Career statistics ==
=== Regular season and playoffs ===
Bold indicates led league
Bold italics indicate NHL record

			Regular season									Playoffs
Season	Team	League	GP	W	L	T	MIN	GA	SO	GAA	SV%	GP	W	L	MIN	GA	SO	GAA	SV%
1981–82	Ste-Foy Gouverneurs	QMAAA	40	27	3	10	2,400	156	3	2.63	—	2	2	0	114	2	1	1.05	—
1982–83	Granby Bisons	QMJHL	54	13	**31**	1	2,808	293	0	6.26	.842	—	—	—	—	—	—	—	—
1983–84	Granby Bisons	QMJHL	61	29	29	1	3,585	265	0	4.44	.873	4	0	4	244	22	0	5.41	.863
1984–85	Granby Bisons	QMJHL	44	16	25	1	2,463	228	0	5.55	.872	—	—	—	—	—	—	—	—
1984–85	Montreal Canadiens	NHL	1	1	0	0	20	0	0	0.00	1.000	—	—	—	—	—	—	—	—
1984–85	Sherbrooke Canadiens	AHL	1	1	0	0	60	4	0	4.00	.852	13	10	3	769	37	0	2.89	—
1985–86	Montreal Canadiens	NHL	47	23	18	3	2,649	148	1	3.35	.875	20	**15**	5	1,215	39	**1**	1.93	.923
1986–87	Montreal Canadiens	NHL	46	22	16	6	2,681	131	1	2.93	.892	6	4	2	330	22	0	4.00	.873
1987–88	Montreal Canadiens	NHL	45	23	12	**9**	2,582	125	3	2.90	**.900**	8	3	4	428	24	0	3.36	.889
1988–89	Montreal Canadiens	NHL	48	33	5	6	2,743	113	4	**2.47**	**.908**	19	13	6	1,206	42	2	2.09	.920
1989–90	Montreal Canadiens	NHL	54	**31**	16	5	3,173	134	3	2.53	**.912**	12	5	6	640	26	1	2.43	.911
1990–91	Montreal Canadiens	NHL	48	25	15	6	2,835	128	1	2.71	.906	13	7	5	785	40	0	3.06	.898
1991–92	Montreal Canadiens	NHL	67	36	22	8	3,934	155	**5**	**2.36**	**.914**	11	4	7	685	30	1	2.63	.904
1992–93	Montreal Canadiens	NHL	62	31	25	5	3,594	192	2	3.20	.894	20	**16**	4	1,293	46	0	2.13	.929
1993–94	Montreal Canadiens	NHL	68	35	17	11	3,867	161	**7**	2.50	.918	6	3	3	374	16	0	2.56	.930
1994–95	Montreal Canadiens	NHL	**43**	17	20	6	**2,566**	127	1	2.97	.906	—	—	—	—	—	—	—	—
1995–96	Montreal Canadiens	NHL	22	12	9	1	1,260	62	1	2.95	.907	—	—	—	—	—	—	—	—
1995–96	Colorado Avalanche	NHL	39	22	15	1	2,305	103	1	2.68	.909	22	**16**	6	**1,453**	**51**	**3**	2.10	.921
1996–97	Colorado Avalanche	NHL	62	**38**	15	7	3,697	143	7	2.32	.923	17	10	**7**	1,033	**38**	**3**	2.21	.932
1997–98	Colorado Avalanche	NHL	65	31	19	13	3,835	153	4	2.39	.916	7	3	4	429	18	0	2.51	.906
1998–99	Colorado Avalanche	NHL	61	32	19	8	3,648	139	5	2.29	.917	19	11	**8**	1,173	**52**	1	2.66	.920
1999–00	Colorado Avalanche	NHL	63	32	21	8	3,704	141	2	2.28	.914	17	11	6	1,039	31	3	1.79	.928
2000–01	Colorado Avalanche	NHL	62	40	13	7	3,584	132	4	2.21	.913	23	**16**	7	1,450	41	**4**	**1.70**	**.934**
2001–02	Colorado Avalanche	NHL	63	32	23	8	3,773	122	**9**	**1.94**	.925	21	11	**10**	1,241	**52**	3	2.51	.909
2002–03	Colorado Avalanche	NHL	63	35	15	**13**	3,768	137	5	2.18	.920	7	3	4	423	16	1	2.27	.910
NHL totals			1,029	551	315	131	60,225	2,546	66	2.54	.912	247	151	94	15,205	584	23	2.30	.918

=== International ===
Year	Team	Event	GP	W	L	T	MIN	GA	SO	GAA	SV%
1998	Canada	OG	6	4	2	0	369	9	1	1.46	.935
Senior totals			6	4	2	0	369	9	1	1.46	.935

== Head coaching record ==
=== NHL ===
Team	Year	Regular season						Postseason			
Team	Year	G	W	L	OTL	Pts	Finish	W	L	Win %	Result
COL	2013–14	82	52	22	8	112	1st in Central	3	4	.429	Lost in first round (MIN)
COL	2014–15	82	39	31	12	90	7th in Central	—	—	—	Missed playoffs
COL	2015–16	82	39	39	4	82	6th in Central	—	—	—	Missed playoffs
COL total		246	130	92	24			3	4	.429	1 playoff appearance
NYI	2023–24	37	20	12	5	(45)	3rd in Metropolitan	1	4	.200	Lost in first round (CAR)
NYI	2024–25	82	35	35	12	82	6th in Metropolitan	—	—	—	Missed playoffs
NYI	2025–26	78	42	31	5	(89)	(fired)	—	—	—	
NYI total		197	97	78	22			1	4	.200	1 playoff appearance
Total		443	227	170	46			4	8	.333	2 playoff appearances

=== QMJHL ===
Team	Year	Regular season						Postseason
Team	Year	Games	Won	Lost	OT/SO	Points	Finish	Result
QUE	2005–06	65	51	12	2	106	1st in Western	Lost in Finals (MON); Won Memorial Cup (MON)
QUE	2006–07	70	37	28	5	79	5th in Western	Lost in division quarterfinals (DRU)
QUE	2007–08	70	38	28	4	80	5th in Western	Lost in division semifinals (GAT)
QUE	2008–09	68	49	16	3	101	1st in Eastern	Lost in semifinals (SHA)
QUE	2009–10	68	41	20	7	89	1st in Eastern	Lost in quarterfinals (VIC)
QUE	2010–11	68	48	16	4	100	1st in Eastern	Lost in semifinals (GAT)
QUE	2011–12	68	43	18	7	93	3rd in Eastern	Lost in quarterfinals (HAL)
QUE	2012–13	68	42	21	5	89	3rd in Eastern	Lost in quarterfinals (ROU)
QUE	2018–19	68	27	28	13	67	4th in Eastern	Lost in conference quarterfinals (HAL)
QUE	2019–20	64	27	32	5	59	3rd in Eastern	Playoffs cancelled due to COVID-19 pandemic
QUE	2020–21	32	17	9	6	40	4th in Eastern	Lost in quarterfinals (CHI)
QUE	2021–22	68	51	15	2	104	1st in Eastern	Lost in semifinals (SHA)
QUE	2022–23	68	53	12	3	109	1st in Eastern	Won in Finals (HAL); Won Memorial Cup (SEA)
Total		845	524	255	66			12 playoff appearances 2 Memorial Cups

== Career achievements ==
=== Milestones ===
- His #30 jersey number has been retired by the Granby Bisons
- His #33 jersey number has been retired by the Colorado Avalanche and the Montreal Canadiens
- In 1998, he was ranked number 22 on The Hockey News' list of the 100 Greatest Hockey Players
- The Colorado Sports Hall of Fame 2004
- Quebec Maritimes Junior Hockey League Hall of Fame 2004
- Hockey Hall of Fame inductee 2006
- Canada's Sports Hall of Fame 2010
- Was ranked #5 in The Hockey News' The Top 60 Since 1967 – the best players of the post-expansion era

=== Records ===
- Most NHL playoff games played by a goaltender (247) (third-most playoff games of all players)
- Most NHL playoff wins by a goaltender (151)
- First NHL goaltender to play 1,000 NHL games (finished with 1,029 games, later passed by Martin Brodeur)
- First NHL goaltender to win 500 games
- Most Conn Smythe Trophy wins – 3
- Most Seasons of 20+ Wins-17

=== Awards ===
==== As a player ====
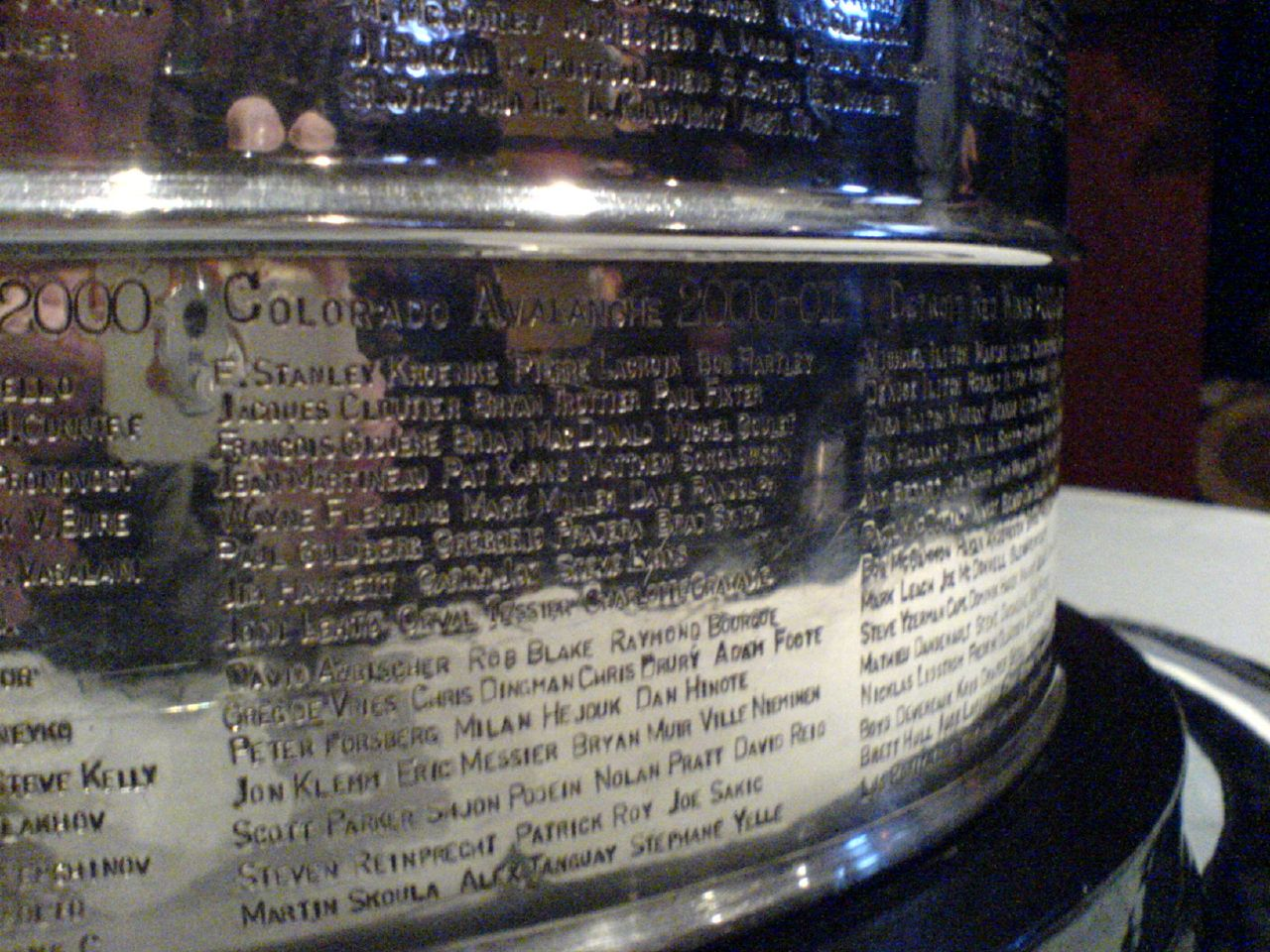
Engravings of the 2001 Colorado Avalanche on the Stanley Cup. Roy's name is engraved on the second last row of names.

- Calder Cup – 1985
- Stanley Cup – 1986, 1993 (Montreal); 1996, 2001 (Colorado)
- Conn Smythe Trophy – 1986, 1993, 2001
- William M. Jennings Trophy – 1987*, 1988*, 1989*, 1992, 2002
- Vezina Trophy – 1989, 1990, 1992
- NHL All-Star Game – 1988, 1990, 1991, 1992, 1993, 1994, 1997, 1998, 2001, 2002, 2003
- NHL first All-Star team – 1989, 1990, 1992, 2002
- NHL second All-Star team – 1988, 1991
- NHL All-Rookie Team – 1986
- Trico Goaltending Award – 1989, 1990

* Shared with Brian Hayward

==== As a coach ====
- Memorial Cup – with Quebec Remparts in 2006 and 2023
- Jack Adams Award – 2014
- Maurice Filion Trophy – 2022
- Gilles-Courteau Trophy - with Quebec Remparts in 2023

== See also ==
- List of NHL goaltenders with 300 wins
- List of NHL players with 1,000 games played

Awards and achievements
Preceded by Wayne Gretzky; Mario Lemieux; Scott Stevens	Winner of the Conn Smythe Trophy; 1986; 1993; 2001	Succeeded by Ron Hextall; Brian Leetch; Nicklas Lidström
Preceded by Grant Fuhr; Ed Belfour	Winner of the Vezina Trophy; 1989, 1990; 1992	Succeeded by Ed Belfour; Ed Belfour
Preceded by Bob Froese, Darren Jensen; Ed Belfour; Dominik Hašek	Winner of the William M. Jennings Trophy; 1987–1989 (with Brian Hayward); 1992; 2002	Succeeded by Andy Moog, Réjean Lemelin; Ed Belfour; Martin Brodeur, Roman Čechmánek, Robert Esche
Sporting positions
Preceded by Joe Sacco	Head coach of the Colorado Avalanche; 2013–2016	Succeeded by Jared Bednar
Preceded by Lane Lambert	Head coach of the New York Islanders; 2024–2026	Succeeded by Peter DeBoer
