= Al Arbour =

Canadian ice hockey player, coach, and executive (1932-2015)

- Hockey Hall of Fame, 1996 (Builder)
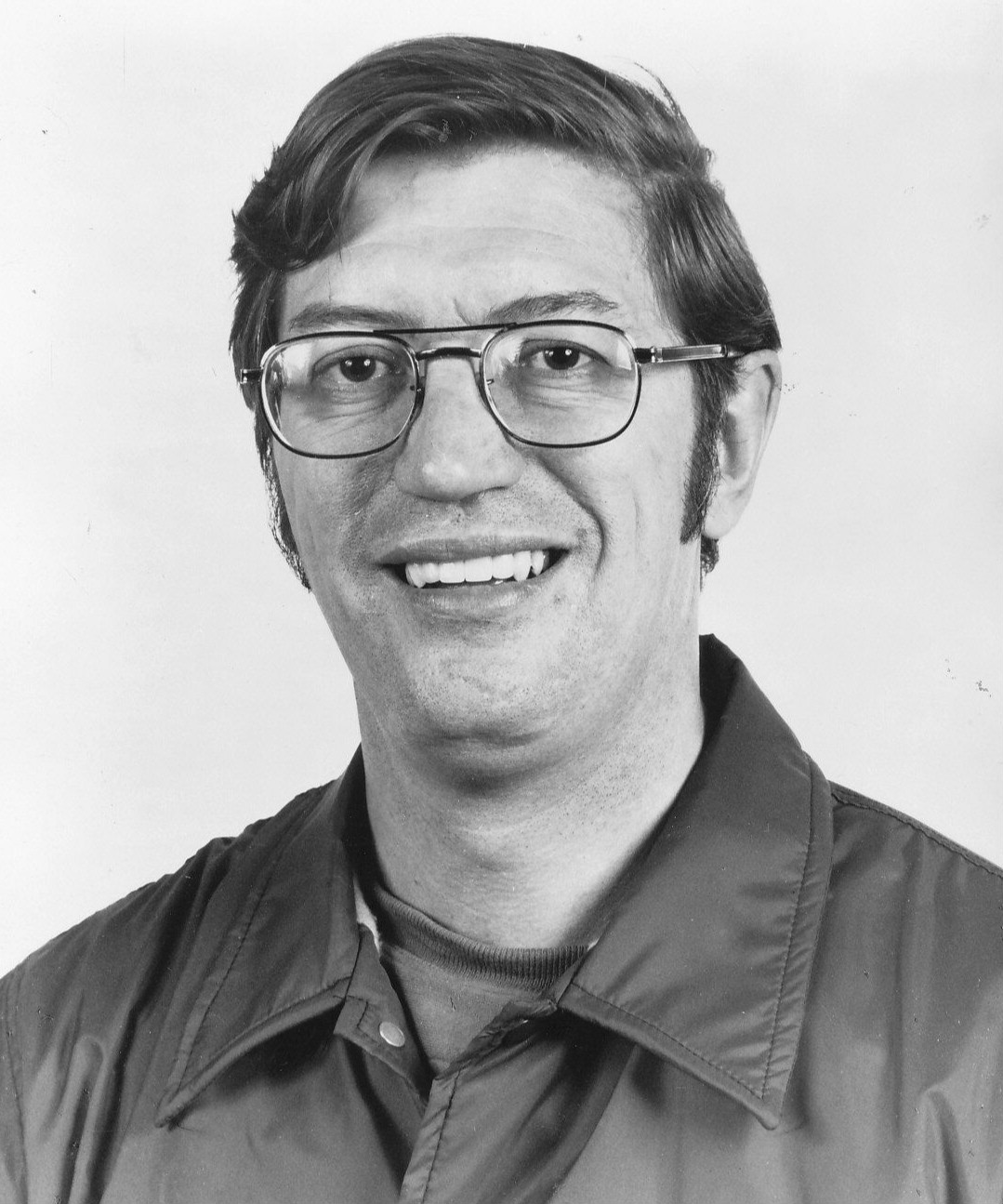
- Arbour in 1977
- Born: November 1, 1932 Sudbury, Ontario, Canada
- Died: August 28, 2015 (aged 82) Sarasota, Florida, U.S.
- Height: 6 ft 0 in (183 cm)
- Weight: 180 lb (82 kg; 12 st 12 lb)
- Position: Defence
- Shot: Left
- Played for: Detroit Red Wings; Chicago Black Hawks; Toronto Maple Leafs; St. Louis Blues
- Coached for: St. Louis Blues; New York Islanders
- Playing career: 1949–1971
- Coaching career: 1970–1994

Alger Joseph Arbour (November 1, 1932 – August 28, 2015) was a Canadian ice hockey player, coach, and executive. He is seventh for games coached in National Hockey League (NHL) history and eighth all-time in wins. Under Arbour, the New York Islanders won four consecutive Stanley Cups from 1980 to 1983 and won a record 19 consecutive playoff series through 1984. His 740 wins with the Islanders is the most for a coach with one team in NHL history. Born in Sudbury, Ontario, Arbour played amateur hockey as a defenceman with the Windsor Spitfires of the Ontario Hockey League (OHL). He played his first professional games with the Detroit Red Wings in 1953. Claimed by the Chicago Black Hawks in 1958, Arbour would help the team win a championship in 1961. Arbour played with the Toronto Maple Leafs for the next five years, winning another Cup in 1962. He was selected by the St. Louis Blues in their 1967 expansion draft and played his final four seasons with the team.

During his last year with the Blues, Arbour was hired mid-season to coach the team. In 107 games, he led them to a 42–40–25 record, but only one playoff series win. After a woeful expansion season in 1972-73 in which the New York Islanders were coached by Phil Goyette and Earl Ingarfield, the club hired Arbour as its new coach in 1973. Arbour led the team to a winning record every season from 1974–75 until he stepped down in 1985–86. Arbour won nineteen consecutive playoff series, which remains an NHL and North American sports record. He was awarded the Jack Adams Award as the league's top coach in 1979. Upon retiring from the bench, Arbour was named vice-president of player development for the Islanders. He returned to coach the Islanders in the 1988–89 season and remained there through 1993-94, notably upsetting the two-time defending champion Pittsburgh Penguins in the 1993 playoffs. He was awarded the Lester Patrick Trophy for his contributions to the sport and was elected to the Hockey Hall of Fame in 1996.

== Playing career ==
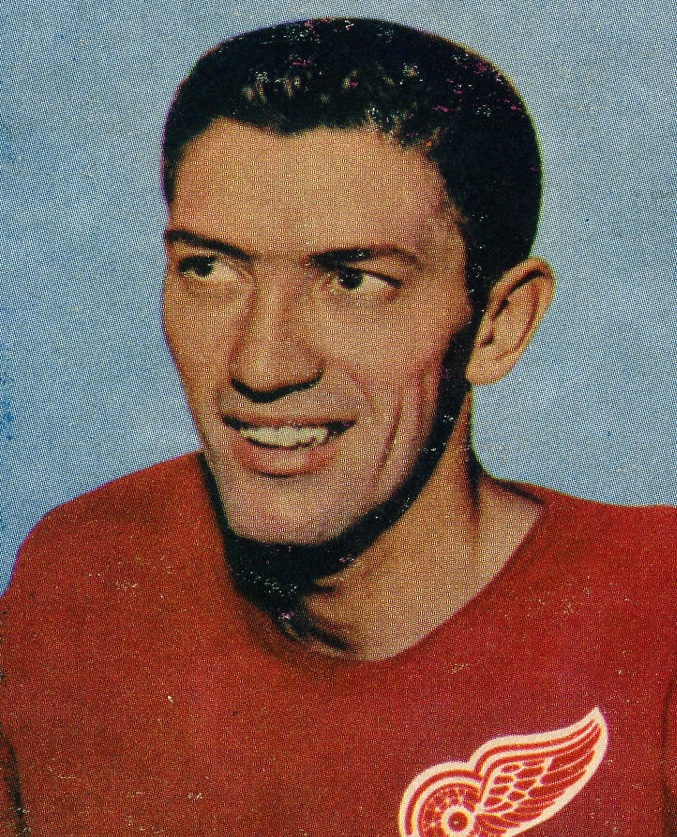
Arbour during his time with the Detroit Red Wings in 1957

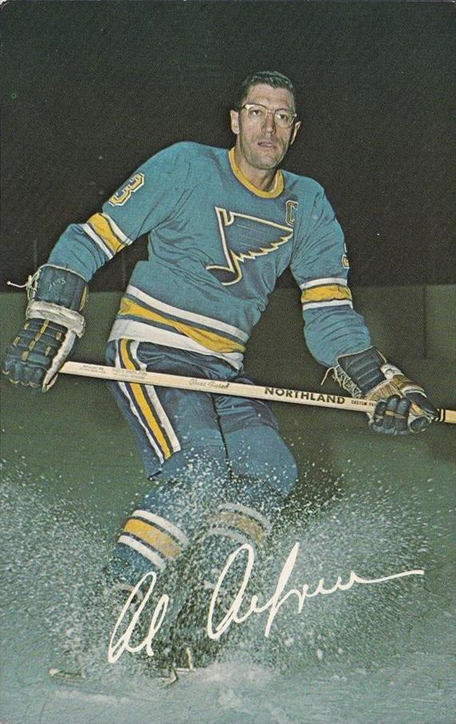
1968 card of Arbour for St. Louis Blues

Arbour started his playing career in 1954 with the Detroit Red Wings. He later skated for the Chicago Black Hawks, Toronto Maple Leafs, and St. Louis Blues. Arbour won the Stanley Cup as a player with the 1960–61 Chicago Black Hawks and the 1961–62 and 1963–64 Toronto Maple Leafs. Arbour, along with teammate Ed Litzenberger, is one of eleven players to win consecutive Stanley Cups with two different teams. He is one of only 11 players in Stanley Cup history to win the Cup with three or more different teams. Arbour was also the first captain of the expansion St. Louis Blues, and played for them when they lost in Cup finals in 1968, 1969, 1970 (all in four consecutive games). One of the few professional athletes to wear eyeglasses when competing, Arbour was the last NHL player to wear them on the ice. Arbour was also known for laying down in front of the goaltender to block shots on goal with his body.

== Coaching career ==
Arbour began his coaching career with the Iowa Hawkeyes hockey team in 1967 and at the time led them in his first year to their best record at .500. In June 1970, he took over as coach for the Blues after Scotty Bowman decided to focus on the general manager position. As it turned out, Arbour coached 50 games while Bowman coached the rest. The following year saw Arbour coach 44 of the games while Sid Abel and Bill McCreary. Following two additional seasons with St. Louis, he was fired by the team on November 8, 1972 and replaced by Jean-Guy Talbot after the team won two of its first thirteen games. He was soon recruited by GM Bill Torrey to take over a young New York Islanders team that had set a then-NHL record for futility by losing 60 games in their inaugural season, 1972–73.

=== New York Islanders (1973–1986) ===
In his first season as Isles' coach, Arbour's team finished last in the league for the second year in a row, but gave up 100 fewer goals and earned 56 points, up from 30 the year before. New York Rangers defenceman Brad Park said after the Islanders beat their crosstown rivals for the first time, "They have a system. They look like a hockey team."

The 1974–75 Islanders finished third in their division with 88 points, which qualified them for the playoffs for the first time in franchise history. They defeated the Rangers in overtime of the deciding third game of their first-round series. In the next round, the Isles found themselves down three games to none in a best of seven quarter-final series against the Pittsburgh Penguins. The Islanders rebounded with three straight victories to tie the series, then prevailed in Game 7 by a score of 1–0. It was only the second time in major sports history, and the first since 1942, that a team won a series after trailing 3–0. The Islanders then faced the Philadelphia Flyers in the next round, again fell behind 3–0, and once again tied the series, although the Flyers prevailed in Game 7 and went on to win their second consecutive Stanley Cup.

Despite achieving great regular season success, culminating in the 1978–79 campaign in which they finished with the best record in the NHL, the Islanders suffered a series of letdowns in the playoffs. In both 1976 and 1977, they lost in the semi-finals to the eventual champion Montreal Canadiens, and then suffered an upset loss to the Toronto Maple Leafs in the 1978 quarter-finals, on a game-winning goal by Lanny McDonald in overtime of Game 7. Then, in 1979, the rival Rangers defeated Arbour's Islanders in the semi-finals 4–2. Arbour won the Jack Adams Award for the team's stellar regular season.

During the 1979–80 season, the Islanders struggled. However, following the acquisition of Butch Goring in March, the Islanders completed the regular season with a 12-game unbeaten streak. The regular season run carried over to the playoffs and the Islanders captured their first Stanley Cup championship on May 24, 1980, by defeating the Philadelphia Flyers in overtime of Game 6.

Arbour and the Islanders went on to capture 3 more Cups in a row, a record for an American hockey club. Along the way, they set records for consecutive regular season victories, consecutive Finals victories, and playoff series victories. By the time the Islanders were dethroned by the Edmonton Oilers in the 1984 Stanley Cup Final, they had strung together 19 straight playoff series victories, a professional sports record. No team in any of the four major sports has strung together four consecutive championships since. The closest a team in any of the major four North American professional sports has come was when the New York Yankees (MLB), who were one out away from their fourth consecutive World Series championship, fell in the seventh game of the series to the Arizona Diamondbacks in 2001.

Arbour retired from coaching following the 1985–86 season and accepted a position in the Islanders front office as vice-president of player development.

=== Return to coaching (1988–1994) ===
Following a disappointing start to the 1988–89 season, Torrey fired Terry Simpson, and Arbour returned to the bench. Most of the veterans of the dynasty had since left the team, and the Islanders missed the playoffs for the first time in 14 years. Arbour had one more run deep into the playoffs in 1992–93, where he led the Islanders past the two-time defending champion Pittsburgh Penguins and to the Prince of Wales Conference Finals. Islanders star Pierre Turgeon, who was seriously injured after Dale Hunter hit him from behind in the previous round, missed all but a few shifts of the second-round series against Pittsburgh. The Mario Lemieux-led Penguins had finished first in the regular season. Arbour's Islanders defeated Pittsburgh in overtime of the seventh game of the series. In the semifinals, the Islanders lost to the eventual champion Montreal Canadiens.

Arbour retired after the 1993–94 season, having led the Islanders to a second playoff berth where they were swept in the first round by the Presidents' Trophy-winning New York Rangers, who went on to capture the Stanley Cup. At that time Arbour had won 739 games as an Islander coach, and a banner with that number was raised to the rafters at the Nassau Veterans Memorial Coliseum on January 25, 1997.

== Retirement ==
On November 3, 2007, Arbour returned, at the request of Islanders coach Ted Nolan, to coach his 1,500th game for the Islanders. The Islanders beat the Pittsburgh Penguins 3–2, giving Arbour his 740th win. The 739-win banner was brought down, and replaced with one with the number 1500, representing the total number of games coached. He is the only coach in NHL history to coach 1,500 games for the same team.

Arbour and his wife, Claire, lived in Longboat Key, Florida, and maintained a summer cottage in Sudbury. The couple had four children together. In 2015, he underwent treatment for Parkinson's disease and dementia in Sarasota, Florida, eventually entering hospice care. Arbour died on August 28, 2015, in Sarasota, Florida, aged 82. Al's wife Claire died February 23, 2024 in Florida.

=== Legacy ===
- Arbour is a member of the Hockey Hall of Fame, New York Islanders Hall of Fame, Nassau County Sports Hall of Fame, and St. Louis Blues Hall of Fame.
- Jack Adams Award as coach in 1979
- Stanley Cup Champion as a player in 1954 (Detroit), 1961 (Chicago), 1962, 1964 (Toronto)
- Stanley Cup Champion as coach in 1980–1983 (head coach for the New York Islanders)
- Calder Cup Champion in 1965, 1966 (with Rochester Americans)

== Career statistics ==
=== Regular season and playoffs ===
			Regular season					Playoffs
Season	Team	League	GP	G	A	Pts	PIM	GP	G	A	Pts	PIM
1949–50	Windsor Spitfires	OHA	3	0	0	0	0	1	0	0	0	0
1949–50	Detroit Hettche	IHL	33	14	8	22	10	3	0	0	0	4
1950–51	Windsor Spitfires	OHA	31	5	4	9	27	—	—	—	—	—
1951–52	Windsor Spitfires	OHA	55	7	12	19	86	—	—	—	—	—
1952–53	Windsor Spitfires	OHA	56	5	7	12	92	—	—	—	—	—
1952–53	Washington Lions	EAHL	4	0	2	2	0	—	—	—	—	—
1952–53	Edmonton Flyers	WHL	8	0	1	1	2	15	0	5	5	10
1953–54	Detroit Red Wings	NHL	36	0	1	1	18	—	—	—	—	—
1953–54	Sherbrooke Saints	QHL	19	1	3	4	24	2	0	0	0	2
1954–55	Edmonton Flyers	WHL	41	3	9	12	39	—	—	—	—	—
1954–55	Quebec Aces	QHL	20	4	5	9	55	4	0	0	0	2
1955–56	Edmonton Flyers	WHL	70	5	14	19	109	3	0	0	0	4
1955–56	Detroit Red Wings	NHL	—	—	—	—	—	4	0	1	1	0
1956–57	Detroit Red Wings	NHL	44	1	6	7	38	5	0	0	0	6
1956–57	Edmonton Flyers	WHL	24	2	3	5	24	—	—	—	—	—
1957–58	Detroit Red Wings	NHL	69	1	6	7	104	4	0	1	1	4
1958–59	Chicago Black Hawks	NHL	70	2	10	12	86	6	1	2	3	26
1959–60	Chicago Black Hawks	NHL	57	1	5	6	66	4	0	0	0	4
1960–61	Chicago Black Hawks	NHL	53	3	2	5	40	7	0	0	0	2
1961–62	Toronto Maple Leafs	NHL	52	1	5	6	68	8	0	0	0	6
1962–63	Toronto Maple Leafs	NHL	4	1	0	1	4	—	—	—	—	—
1962–63	Rochester Americans	AHL	63	6	21	27	97	2	0	2	2	2
1963–64	Toronto Maple Leafs	NHL	6	0	1	1	0	1	0	0	0	0
1963–64	Rochester Americans	AHL	60	3	19	22	62	2	1	0	1	0
1964–65	Rochester Americans	AHL	71	1	16	17	88	10	0	1	1	16
1964–65	Toronto Maple Leafs	NHL	—	—	—	—	—	1	0	0	0	2
1965–66	Toronto Maple Leafs	NHL	4	0	1	1	2	—	—	—	—	—
1965–66	Rochester Americans	AHL	59	2	11	13	86	12	0	2	2	8
1966–67	Rochester Americans	AHL	71	3	19	22	48	13	0	1	1	16
1967–68	St. Louis Blues	NHL	74	1	10	11	50	14	0	3	3	10
1968–69	St. Louis Blues	NHL	67	1	6	7	50	12	0	0	0	10
1969–70	St. Louis Blues	NHL	68	0	3	3	85	14	0	1	1	16
1970–71	St. Louis Blues	NHL	22	0	2	2	6	6	0	0	0	6
NHL totals			626	12	58	70	617	86	1	8	9	92

=== Coaching record ===
Team	Year	Regular season						Postseason			
Team	Year	G	W	L	T	Pts	Finish	W	L	Win %	Result
STL	1970–71	50	21	15	14	56	2nd in West	2	4	.333	Lost in Quarterfinals (MIN)
STL	1971–72	44	19	19	6	44	3rd in West	4	7	.364	Lost in Semifinals (BOS)
STL	1972–73	13	2	6	5	9	Fired	—	—	—	—
STL total		107	42	40	25	109		4	7	.364	2 playoff appearances
NYI	1973–74	78	19	41	18	56	8th in East	—	—	—	Missed playoffs
NYI	1974–75	80	33	25	22	88	3rd in Patrick	7	8	.467	Lost in Semifinals (PHI)
NYI	1975–76	80	42	21	17	101	2nd in Patrick	7	6	.538	Lost in Semifinals (MTL)
NYI	1976–77	80	47	21	12	106	2nd in Patrick	8	4	.667	Lost in Semifinals (MTL)
NYI	1977–78	80	48	17	15	111	1st in Patrick	3	4	.429	Lost in Quarterfinals (TOR)
NYI	1978–79	80	51	15	14	116	1st in Patrick	9	6	.600	Lost in Semifinals (NYR)
NYI	1979–80	80	39	28	13	91	2nd in Patrick	15	6	.714	Won Stanley Cup (PHI)
NYI	1980–81	80	48	18	14	110	1st in Patrick	15	3	.833	Won Stanley Cup (MIN)
NYI	1981–82	80	54	16	10	118	1st in Patrick	15	4	.789	Won Stanley Cup (VAN)
NYI	1982–83	80	42	26	12	96	2nd in Patrick	15	5	.750	Won Stanley Cup (EDM)
NYI	1983–84	80	50	26	4	104	1st in Patrick	12	9	.571	Lost in Stanley Cup Final (EDM)
NYI	1984–85	80	40	34	6	86	3rd in Patrick	4	6	.400	Lost in Division Finals (PHI)
NYI	1985–86	80	39	29	12	90	3rd in Patrick	0	3	.000	Lost in Division Semifinals (WSH)
NYI	1988–89	53	21	29	3	45	6th in Patrick	—	—	—	Missed playoffs
NYI	1989–90	80	31	38	11	73	4th in Patrick	1	4	.200	Lost in Division Semifinals (NYR)
NYI	1990–91	80	25	45	10	60	6th in Patrick	—	—	—	Missed playoffs
NYI	1991–92	80	34	35	11	79	5th in Patrick	—	—	—	Missed playoffs
NYI	1992–93	84	40	37	7	87	3rd in Patrick	9	9	.500	Lost in Conference Finals (MTL)
NYI	1993–94	84	36	36	12	84	4th in Atlantic	0	4	.000	Lost in Conference Quarterfinals (NYR)
NYI	2007–08	1	1	0	0	2	—	—	—	—	—
NYI total		1,500	740	537	223	1,703		119	79	.601	15 playoff appearances 4 Stanley Cup titles
NHL totals		1,607	782	577	248	1,812		123	86	.589	17 playoff appearances 4 Stanley Cup wins

== See also ==
- List of members of the Hockey Hall of Fame
- List of National Hockey League head coaching wins and point percentage leaders

Sporting positions
Preceded by Position created Red Berenson	St. Louis Blues captain 1967–70; 1971	Succeeded by Red Berenson; Jim Roberts
Preceded by Scotty Bowman; Bill McCreary Sr.	Head coach of the St. Louis Blues; 1970–71; 1971–72	Succeeded by Scotty Bowman; Jean-Guy Talbot
Preceded by Earl Ingarfield, Sr. Terry Simpson	Head coach of the New York Islanders; 1973–86; 1988–94	Succeeded by Terry Simpson; Lorne Henning
Awards and achievements
Preceded by Bobby Kromm	Winner of the Jack Adams Award; 1979	Succeeded by Pat Quinn
