= List of New York Islanders head coaches =

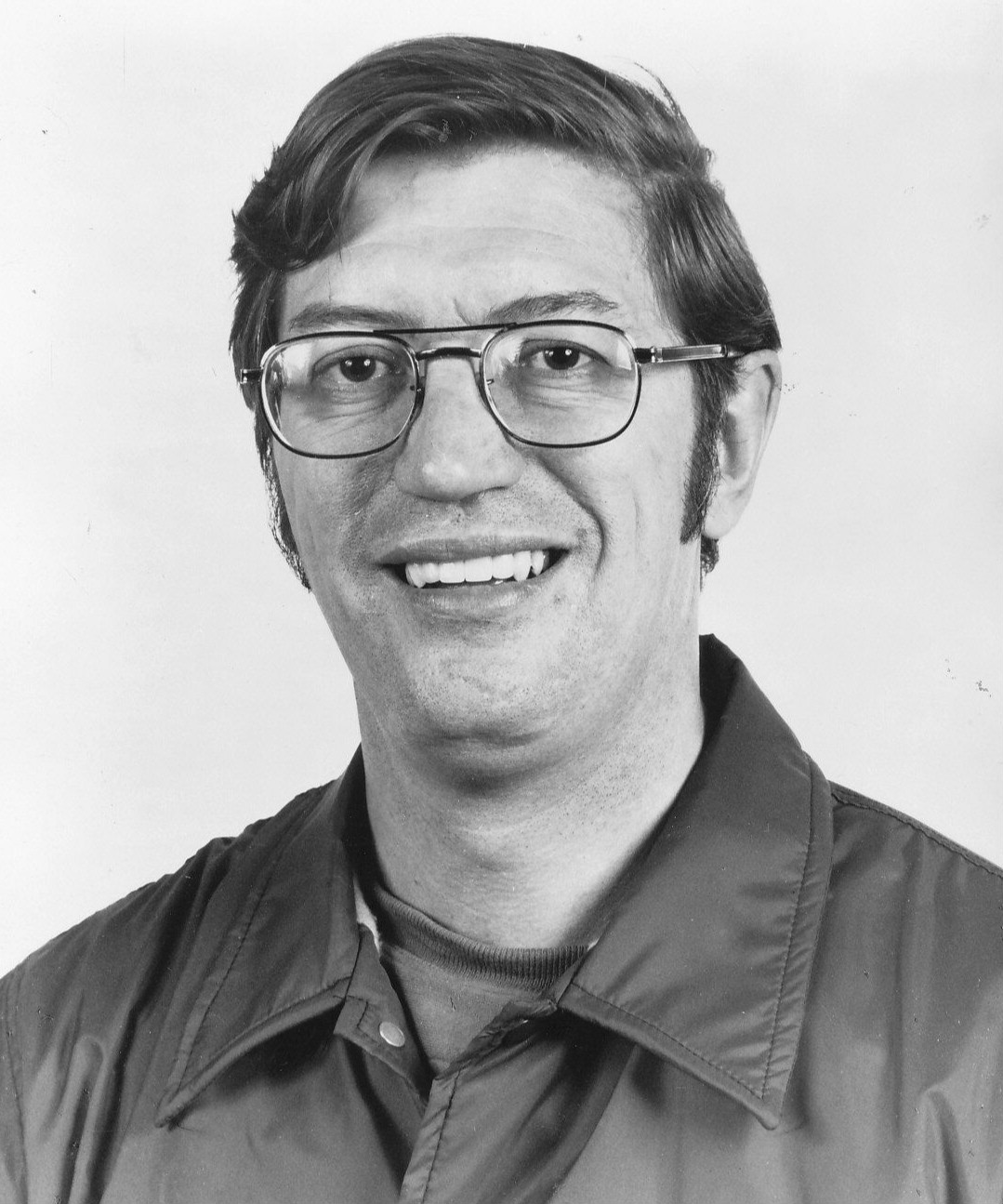
Al Arbour led the Islanders to four consecutives Stanley Cups from 1980 to 1983

The New York Islanders are a professional ice hockey team based in Elmont, New York. They play in the Metropolitan Division of the Eastern Conference in the National Hockey League (NHL). The team joined the NHL in 1972, and won their first Stanley Cup championship in 1980. The Islanders play their home games at UBS Arena in Elmont. Jon Ledecky and Scott D. Malkin are the Islanders' majority owners, Mathieu Darche is their general manager, Peter DeBoer is the head coach and Anders Lee is the team captain.

There have been 19 head coaches for the Islanders franchise. The team's first head coach was Phil Goyette, who coached the team for part of the 1972–73 season. Al Arbour is the franchise's all-time leader for the most regular season games coached (1,500) and the most regular season game wins (740); he is also the franchise's all-time leader for the most playoff games coached (198), and the most playoff game wins (119). Arbour is the only Islanders coach to have been inducted into the Hockey Hall of Fame. He and Trotz are the only Islanders coaches to have won the Jack Adams Award as the NHL's top coach. The franchise has participated in the Stanley Cup Final five times, coached by Arbour each time; they won Stanley Cup four of those times. Arbour, Terry Simpson, Peter Laviolette, Steve Stirling, Ted Nolan, Jack Capuano, Barry Trotz, Lane Lambert, and Patrick Roy are the coaches who coached the team into the Stanley Cup playoffs.

== Key ==
#	Number of coaches^{[a]}
GC	Games coached
W	Wins = 2 points
L	Losses = 0 points
T	Ties = 1 point
PTS	Points
Win%	Winning percentage^{[c]}
†	Elected to the Hockey Hall of Fame as a builder
*	Spent entire NHL head coaching career with the Islanders

== Coaches ==
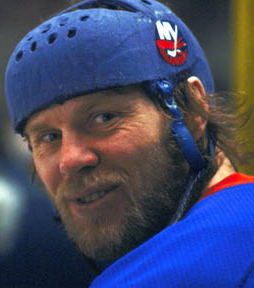
Butch Goring coached the Islanders from 1999 to 2001

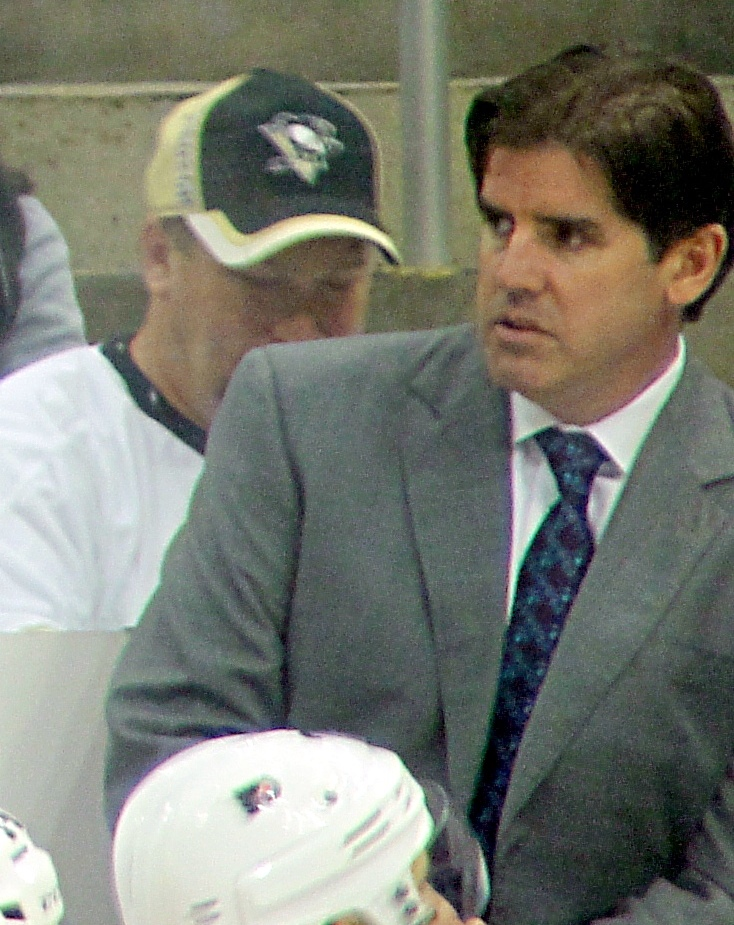
Peter Laviolette coached the Islanders from 2001 to 2003

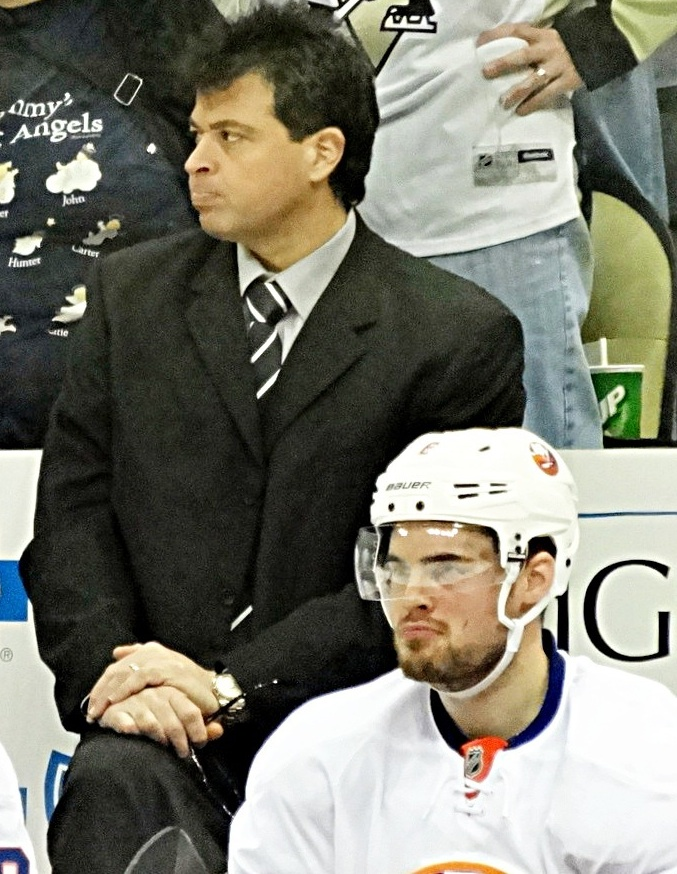
Jack Capuano coached the Islanders from 2010 to 2017

Note: Statistics are correct through the 2025–26 season.

#	Name	Term^{[d]}	Regular season						Playoffs				Achievements	Notes
#	Name	Term^{[d]}	GC	W	L	T	OTL	Win%	GC	W	L	Win%	Achievements	Notes
1	Phil Goyette*	1972–1973	48	6	38	4	—	.167	—	—	—	—		
2	Earl Ingarfield*	1973	30	6	22	2	—	.233	—	—	—	—		
3	Al Arbour†	1973–1986	1,038	552	317	169	—	.613	171	109	62	.637	Stanley Cup champions (1980, 1981, 1982, 1983); Jack Adams Award (1979)	
4	Terry Simpson	1986–1988	187	81	82	24	—	.497	20	9	11	.450		
—	Al Arbour†	1988–1994	461	187	220	54	—	.464	27	10	17	.370		
5	Lorne Henning	1994–1995	48	15	28	5	—	.365	—	—	—	—		
6	Mike Milbury	1995–1997	127	35	73	19	—	.350	—	—	—	—		
7	Rick Bowness	1997–1998	100	38	50	12	—	.440	—	—	—	—		
—	Mike Milbury	1998–1999	66	22	39	5	—	.371	—	—	—	—		
8	Bill Stewart*	1999	35	10	18	7	—	.386	—	—	—	—		
9	Butch Goring	1999–2001	143	41	89	14	4	.338	—	—	—	—		
—	Lorne Henning	2001	17	4	11	2	0	.294	—	—	—	—		
10	Peter Laviolette	2001–2003	164	77	62	19	6	.546	12	4	8	.333		
11	Steve Stirling*	2003–2006	118	56	51	11	6	.520	5	1	4	.200		
12	Brad Shaw*	2006	40	18	18	—	4	.500	—	—	—	—		
13	Ted Nolan	2006–2007	82	40	30	—	12	.561	5	1	4	.200		
—	Al Arbour†^{[e]}	2007	1	1	0	—	0	1.000	—	—	—	—		
—	Ted Nolan	2007–2008	81	34	38	—	9	.475	—	—	—	—		
14	Scott Gordon	2008–2010	181	64	94	—	23	.417	—	—	—	—		
15	Jack Capuano*	2010–2017	483	227	192	—	64	.536	24	10	14	.417		
16	Doug Weight*	2017–2018	122	59	49	—	14	.541	—	—	—	—		
17	Barry Trotz	2018–2022	288	152	102	—	34	.587	49	28	21	.571	Jack Adams Award (2019)	
18	Lane Lambert	2022–2024	127	61	46	—	20	.559	6	2	4	.333		
19	Patrick Roy	2024–2026	197	97	78	—	22	.548	5	1	4	.200		
20	Peter DeBoer	2026–present	4	1	3	—	0	.250	—	—	—	–		

== Notes ==
- ^{a} A running total of the number of coaches of the Islanders. Thus, any coach who has two or more separate terms as head coach is only counted once.
- ^{b} Before the 2005–06 season, the NHL instituted a penalty shootout for regular season games that remained tied after a five-minute overtime period, which prevented ties.
- ^{c} In hockey, the winning percentage is calculated by dividing points by maximum possible points.
- ^{d} Each year is linked to an article about that particular NHL season.
- ^{e} Arbour replaced Ted Nolan as an interim head coach for one game in order to have coached 1500 Islanders games.
