= List of Colorado Avalanche head coaches =

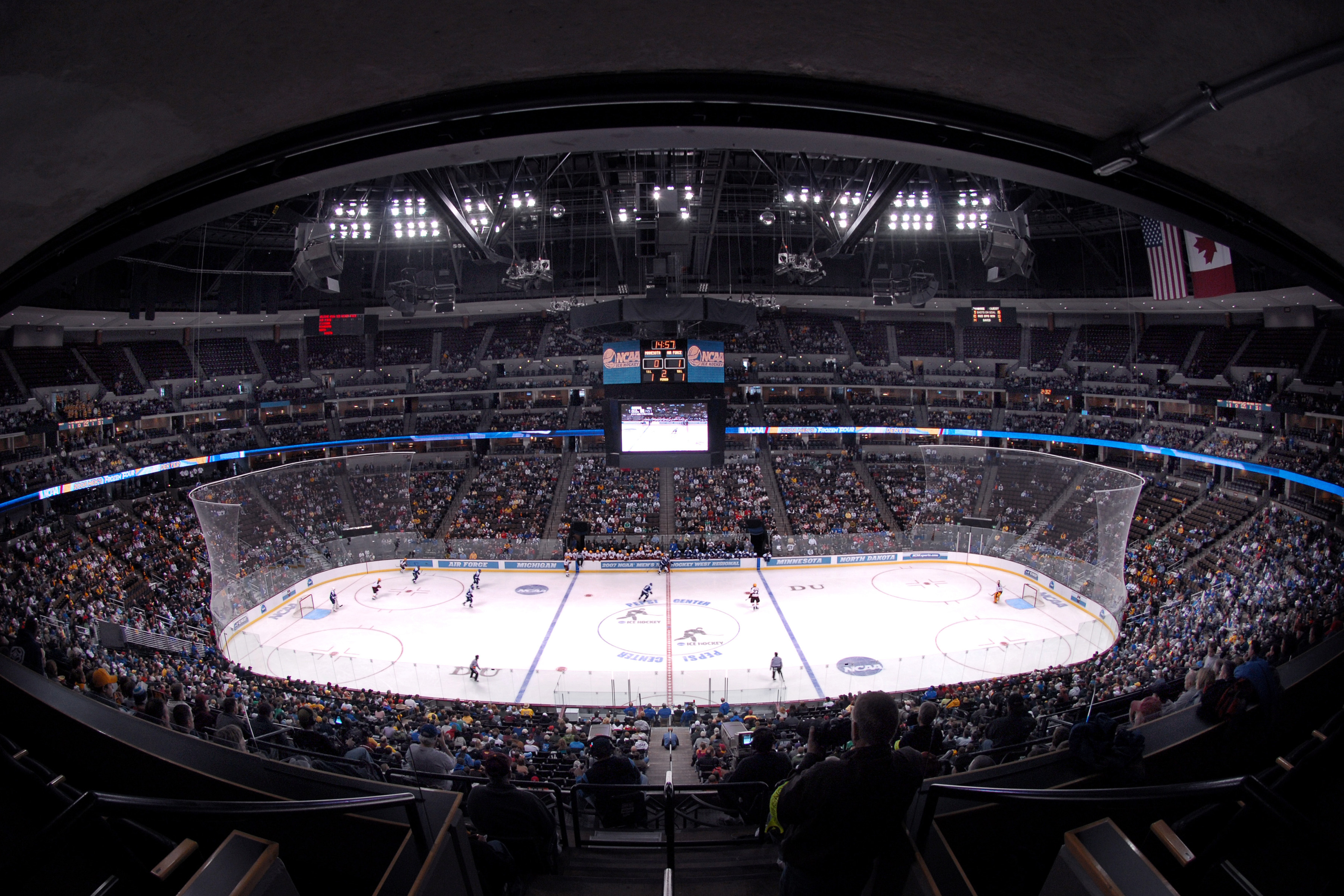
The Avalanche have played their home games at Ball Arena since 1999.

The Colorado Avalanche are an American professional ice hockey team based in Denver. They play in the Central Division of the Western Conference in the National Hockey League (NHL). The team joined the NHL in 1972 as a charter member of the World Hockey Association, and were named the Quebec Nordiques, but moved to Denver in 1995. The Avalanche won their first Stanley Cup championship in 1996, and won another one in 2001. Having first played at the McNichols Sports Arena, the Avalanche have played their home games at Ball Arena (formerly the Pepsi Center) since 1999. The Avalanche are owned by Ann Walton Kroenke, their general manager is Chris MacFarland, Joe Sakic was named president of hockey operations in 2022. Gabriel Landeskog is the team captain.

There have been seven head coaches for the Avalanche team. The team's first head coach was Marc Crawford, who coached for three seasons. None of the Avalanche head coaches have been elected into the Hockey Hall of Fame as a builder. Tony Granato, who coached two terms with the Avalanche, has spent his entire NHL head coaching career with the Avalanche. Granato was fired after the 2008–09 season.

On June 4, 2009, the Avalanche hired Joe Sacco, the coach of their AHL affiliate The Lake Erie Monsters, as the new head coach to succeed Granato. Following the 2012–13 season, his fourth year at the helm, finishing last in the Western Conference and out of the playoffs for a third consecutive year, Sacco was relieved of his duties on April 28, 2013.

A month later, former Avalanche goalie Patrick Roy was introduced as the team's latest head coach on May 28, 2013. On August 11, 2016, Roy announced that he had resigned as head coach of the Avalanche.

On August 25, 2016, Jared Bednar was announced as the seventh head coach in Avalanche history.

Crawford, Hartley and Bednar are the only head coaches to have won the Stanley Cup with the Avalanche, in the 1996 Stanley Cup Final, the 2001 Stanley Cup Final and the 2022 Stanley Cup Final respectively.

== Key ==
#	Number of coaches^{[a]}
GC	Games coached
W	Wins = 2 points
L	Losses = 0 points
T	Ties = 1 point
OT	Overtime/shootout losses = 1 point^{[b]}
PTS	Points
Win%	Winning percentage
*	Spent entire NHL head coaching career with the Avalanche

== Coaches ==
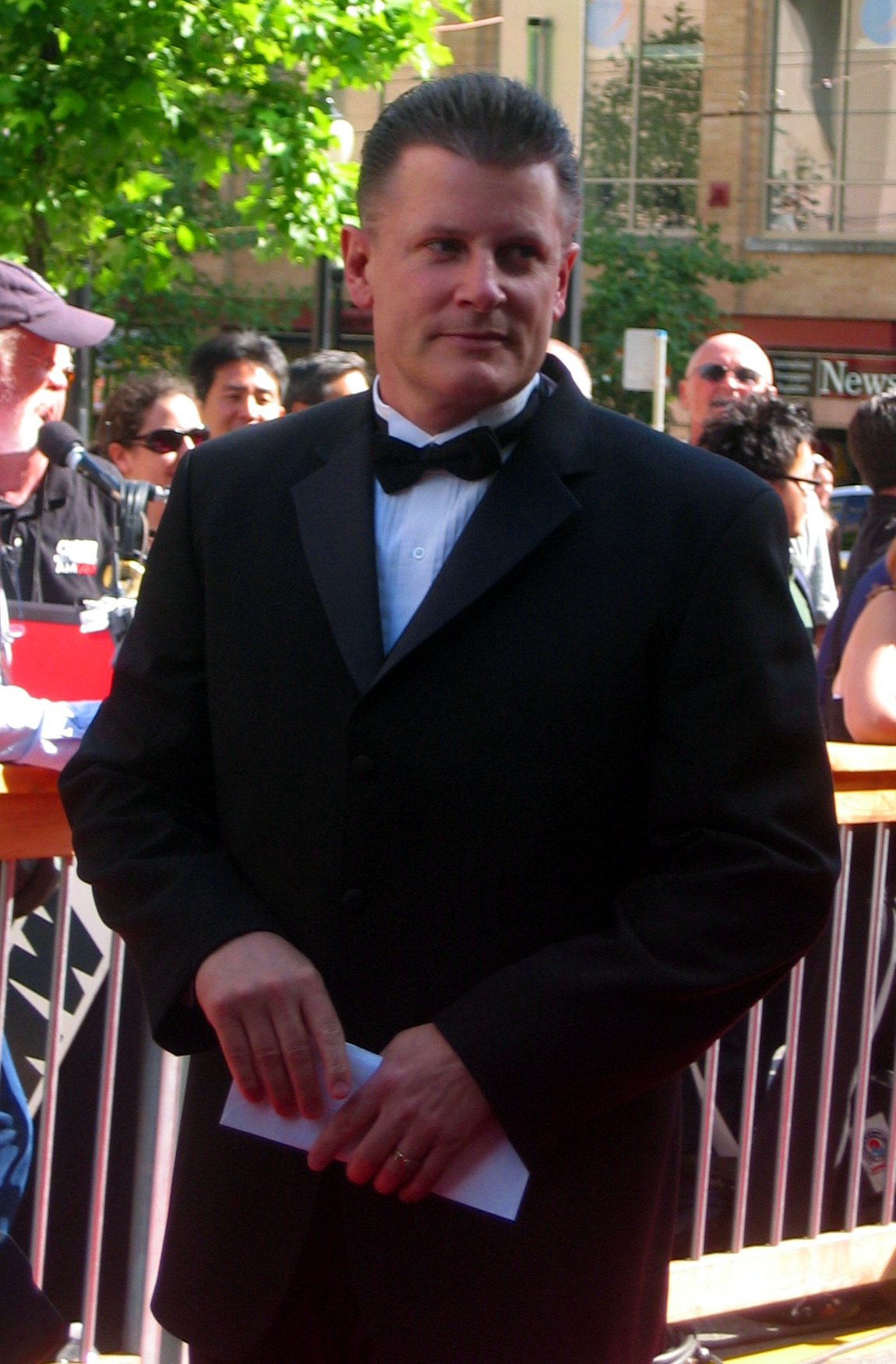
Marc Crawford was the Avalanche team's first head coach.

Note: Statistics are correct through the 2024–25 season.

#	Name	Term^{[c]}	Regular season						Playoffs				Achievements	Reference
#	Name	Term^{[c]}	GC	W	L	T/OT	PTS	Win%	GC	W	L	Win%	Achievements	Reference
1	Marc Crawford	1995–1998	246	135	75	26	306	.622	46	29	17	.630	Stanley Cup championship (1996)	
2	Bob Hartley	1998–2002	359	193	108	58	444	.618	80	49	31	.613	Stanley Cup championship (2001)	
3	Tony Granato*	2002–2004	133	72	33	28	172	.647	18	9	9	.500		
4	Joel Quenneville	2005–2008	246	131	92	23	285	.579	19	8	11	.421		
—	Tony Granato*	2008–2009	82	32	45	5	69	.421	—	—	—	—		
5	Joe Sacco	2009–2013	294	130	134	30	290	.493	6	2	4	.333		
6	Patrick Roy	2013–2016	246	130	92	24	284	.577	7	3	4	.429	Jack Adams Award winner (2014)	
7	Jared Bednar*	2016– 2026	700	390	246	64	844	.603	81	49	32	.605	Stanley Cup championship (2022)	

== See also ==
- List of NHL head coaches
- List of Quebec Nordiques head coaches

== Notes ==
- ^{a} A running total of the number of coaches of the Avalanche. Thus, any coach who has two or more separate terms as head coach is only counted once.
- ^{b} Before the 2005–06 season, the NHL instituted a penalty shootout for regular season games that remained tied after a five-minute overtime period, which prevented ties.
- ^{c} Each year is linked to an article about that particular NHL season.
