= World U-17 Hockey Challenge =

International ice hockey tournament

- Current season, competition or edition: 2026 World U-17 Hockey Challenge
- Sport: Ice hockey
- First season: 1986
- Organizing body: Hockey Canada
- No. of teams: 6
- Competitors: Canada Red, Canada White, United States, Sweden, Finland, Czech Republic
- Most recent champion: United States
- Most titles: Canada Ontario (8)
- Related competitions: Canadian Junior Hockey League; World Junior A Challenge
- Website: World U-17 Hockey Challenge

The World U-17 Hockey Challenge, originally known as the Quebec Esso Cup, is an international ice hockey tournament held annually in Canada. Prior to 2011, (Note: The ice hockey tournament at the 2011 Canada Games was supposed be held in place of a 2011 tournament. The Canada Games tournament for U16 players was played at the 2011 Games in Halifax. The U17 tournament was played as planned in Winnipeg and Portage la Prairie, Manitoba. The female U18s nationals was off this year due to the Canada Games, but not the men.) the tournament did not operate during years in which the Canada Winter Games were held. As such, the World Under-17 Challenge was held three out of every four years. It is organized by Hockey Canada and is the first major international competition for male hockey players under the age of 17. The tournament is the first step in Hockey Canada's Program of Excellence and is used to identify players moving on to the U18 and National Junior Team.

== Origins ==
The inaugural World Under-17 Hockey Challenge took place in Quebec as the 1986 Quebec Esso Cup. At the time, it was considered the unofficial world championship of midget hockey. It was also used as a development tool for the Canadian Amateur Hockey Association to identify players for further development as well as expose them to their first taste of international competition. The tournament was among ten teams, five regional teams from Canada, Finland, Czechoslovakia, the United States, Sweden, and the Soviet Union. Team Quebec, led by future NHL first overall pick Pierre Turgeon captured gold by defeating the Soviets, who featured the likes of Sergei Fedorov and Alexander Mogilny.

Prior to November 2014, the tournament was held from late December through to early January. Originally, Canada would field five teams, selected on a regional basis.

== Current tournament ==
The World Under-17 Hockey Challenge has continued to grow over the years to the point where it is perhaps the largest annual event administered under Hockey Canada's own auspices. Although the tournament is not sanctioned by the IIHF, it attracts U17 teams from the United States, Sweden, Finland and Czechia on an annual basis.

The tournament is currently held in November of each year.

== Participating teams ==
Canada enters nowadays two teams each year. Prior to November 2014, Canada entered five regional teams.

Other participating nations have included:

- United States
- Sweden
- Finland
- Czech Republic

- Russia
- Germany
- Slovakia
- Soviet Union (now defunct)
- Czechoslovakia (now defunct)

Teams from the Canadian provinces Alberta, British Columbia, Manitoba and Saskatchewan competed at the 1998 World U-17 Hockey Challenge I in Swift Current, Saskatchewan.

== Results ==
Year	(gold) Gold	(silver) Silver	(bronze) Bronze	Host city (cities)
1986	Canada Quebec	Soviet Union	Canada Pacific	Quebec City
1988	Soviet Union	Sweden	Canada Quebec	Quebec City
1990	Finland	Canada Quebec	Soviet Union	Quebec City
1991	The ice hockey tournament at the 1991 Canada Games was held in place of a 1991 tournament.			
1992	Canada Ontario	Canada Quebec	Czechoslovakia	(Ontario) Sudbury
1994	Canada Quebec	United States	Canada Pacific	(Quebec) Amos
1995	Canada Ontario	Finland	Canada Quebec	(New Brunswick) Moncton
1997	Canada Ontario	Sweden	Canada Quebec	(Alberta) Red Deer
1998 I (Note: Split events were held in 1998)	Saskatchewan	United States	Finland	(Saskatchewan) Swift Current
1998 II	Canada Ontario	Czech Republic	Canada Quebec	(Ontario) Kitchener
1999	The ice hockey tournament at the 1999 Canada Games was held in place of a 1999 tournament.			
2000	Russia	Canada Ontario	Canada Pacific	(Ontario) Timmins / Chapleau / Cochrane / Haileybury / Hearst / Kapuskasing / Kirkland Lake / New Liskeard / Smooth Rock Falls / Rouyn-Noranda
2001	United States	Canada Pacific	Canada Ontario	(Nova Scotia) New Glasgow / Truro
2002	United States	Canada Pacific	Canada Ontario	(Manitoba) Selkirk / Stonewall
2003	The ice hockey tournament at the 2003 Canada Games was held in place of a 2003 tournament.			
2004	Canada Ontario	Canada Pacific	Canada Quebec	(Newfoundland and Labrador) St. John's
2005	Canada West	Canada Pacific	Canada Atlantic	(Alberta) Lethbridge
2006	Canada Quebec	United States	Czech Republic	(Saskatchewan) Balgonie / Fort Qu'Appelle / Indian Head / Milestone / Moose Jaw / Regina / Southey / Weyburn
2007	The ice hockey tournament at the 2007 Canada Winter Games was held in place of a 2007 tournament.			
2008	Canada Ontario	United States	Canada West	(Ontario) London / Lucan / St. Thomas / Stratford / Strathroy / Woodstock
2009	Canada Ontario	Canada Pacific	United States	(British Columbia) Campbell River / Courtenay / Duncan / Nanaimo / Parksville / Port Alberni
2010	United States	Canada Ontario	Sweden	(Ontario) Timmins / Iroquois Falls / Cochrane / Kapuskasing / Kirkland Lake / New Liskeard
2011	Canada Ontario	United States	Canada Pacific	(Manitoba) Winnipeg and Portage la Prairie
2012	Russia	United States	Canada Ontario	(Ontario) Windsor
2013	Sweden	Russia	United States	(Quebec) Drummondville and Victoriaville
2014 (Jan.)	United States	Canada Pacific	Russia	(Nova Scotia) (Sydney/North Sydney/Port Hawkesbury)
2014 (Nov.)	Russia	United States	Sweden	(Ontario) Sarnia and Lambton Shores
2015	Canada White	Russia	Sweden	(British Columbia) Dawson Creek and Fort St. John
2016	Sweden	Canada Black	Russia	(Ontario) Sault Ste. Marie
2017	United States	Canada Red	Czech Republic	(British Columbia) Dawson Creek and Fort St. John
2018	Russia	Finland	Sweden	(New Brunswick) Saint John and Quispamsis
2019	Russia	United States	Czech Republic	(Alberta) (Saskatchewan) Medicine Hat and Swift Current
2020	Tournament cancelled due to coronavirus pandemic.			(Prince Edward Island) Charlottetown and Summerside
2021	Tournament cancelled due to coronavirus pandemic.			(Prince Edward Island) Charlottetown and Summerside
2022	United States	Canada Red	Finland	(British Columbia) Langley and Delta
2023	Canada White	United States	Sweden	(Prince Edward Island) Charlottetown and Summerside
2024	Canada White	Canada Red	Sweden	(Ontario) Sarnia
2025	Canada Red	Canada White	United States	(Nova Scotia) Truro
2026	United States	Czech Republic	Canada Red	(Ontario) Oakville

== Medal table ==
Country/Province	(gold) Gold	(silver) Silver	(bronze) Bronze	Medals
Canada Ontario	8	2	3	13
United States	7	9	3	19
Russia; Soviet Union	5; 1; 6	2; 1; 3	2; 1; 3	9; 3; 12
Canada Quebec	3	2	5	10
Canada White	3	1	0	4
Sweden	2	2	6	10
Finland	1	2	2	5
Canada Red	1	3	1	5
Canada West	1	0	1	2
Saskatchewan	1	0	0	1
Canada Pacific	0	6	4	10
Czech Republic; Czechoslovakia	0; 0; 0	2; 0; 2	3; 1; 4	4; 1; 6
Canada Black	0	1	0	1
Canada Atlantic	0	0	1	1
Totals:	33	33	33	99

== Medals by Nations (1986–2026) ==
Rank	Nation	Gold	Silver	Bronze	Total
1	Canada (CAN)	17	15	15	47
2	United States (USA)	7	9	3	19
3	Russia (RUS)	6	3	3	12
4	Sweden (SWE)	2	2	6	10
5	Finland (FIN)	1	2	2	5
6	Czech Republic (CZE)	0	2	4	6
Totals (6 entries)		33	33	33	99

== Notable participants ==
In bold, players selected first overall in the NHL entry draft

- **Pierre Turgeon, Team Quebec, 1986**
- Sergei Fedorov, Team USSR, 1986
- Alexander Mogilny, Team USSR, 1986
- Joe Sakic, Team Pacific, 1986
- Jeremy Roenick, Team USA, 1986
- Pavel Bure, Team Soviet Union, 1988
- **Mats Sundin, Team Sweden, 1988**
- Jere Lehtinen, Team Finland, 1990
- Sami Kapanen, Team Finland, 1990
- Martin Lapointe, Team Quebec, 1990
- Nikolai Khabibulin, Team USSR, 1990
- Chris Gratton, Team Ontario, 1992
- Ethan Moreau, Team Ontario, 1992
- Todd Harvey, Team Ontario, 1992
- Jamie Storr, Team Ontario, 1992
- **Alexandre Daigle, Team Quebec, 1992**
- Éric Dazé, Team Quebec, 1992
- Jocelyn Thibault, Team Quebec, 1992
- Radek Bonk, Team Czechoslovakia, 1992
- Viktor Kozlov, Team USSR, 1992
- Adam Deadmarsh, Team Pacific, 1992
- Darcy Tucker, Team Pacific, 1992
- Niklas Sundström, Team Sweden, 1992
- Daniel Brière, Team Quebec, 1994
- Jean-Sébastien Giguère, Team Quebec, 1994
- Jarome Iginla, Team Pacific, 1994
- Brad Larsen, Team Pacific, 1994
- **Bryan Berard, Team USA, 1994**
- **Joe Thornton, Team Ontario, 1995**
- Roberto Luongo, Team Quebec, 1995
- Patrick Marleau, Team West, 1995
- Brian Gionta, Team USA, 1995
- Scott Gomez, Team USA, 1995
- Martin Hyun, Team Germany, 1995
- Sascha Goc, Team Germany, 1995
- Mika Noronen, Team Finland, 1995
- **Vincent Lecavalier, Team Quebec, 1996**
- David Legwand, Team USA, 1996
- Duncan Keith, Team Pacific, 2000
- **Ilya Kovalchuk, Team Russia, 2000**
- Joni Pitkänen, Team Finland, 2000
- Ryan Kesler, Team USA, 2001
- **Alexander Ovechkin, Team Russia, 2002**
- Jack Johnson, Team USA, 2004
- Phil Kessel, Team USA, 2004
- Jonathan Toews, Team West, 2005
- **Erik Johnson, Team USA, 2005**
- **Patrick Kane, Team USA, 2005**
- **Taylor Hall, Team Ontario, 2008**
- **Aaron Ekblad, Team Ontario, 2012**
- Bo Horvat, Team Ontario, 2012
- **Auston Matthews, Team USA, 2014**
- Mitch Marner, Team Ontario, 2014
- Matthew Tkachuk, Team USA, 2014
- Andrei Svechnikov, Team Russia, 2015
- Brady Tkachuk, Team USA, 2015
- **Jack Hughes, Team USA, 2017**
- **Macklin Celebrini, Team Canada Black, 2022**

== See also ==
- World Junior A Challenge
- IIHF World U20 Championship
- IIHF World U18 Championship
