= List of Florida Panthers records =

List of franchise records for the Florida Panthers of the National Hockey League.

== Career leaders ==
=== Regular season ===
	Career leader		Active leader^{†}	
Games	Aleksander Barkov	737	Aleksander Barkov	737
Goals	Aleksander Barkov	266	Aleksander Barkov	266
Power play goals	Aleksander Barkov	75	Aleksander Barkov	75
Short-handed goals	Radek Dvořák	16	Aleksander Barkov	12
Game-winning goals	Aleksander Barkov	48	Aleksander Barkov	48
Assists	Aleksander Barkov	445	Aleksander Barkov	445
Points	Aleksander Barkov	711	Aleksander Barkov	711
Points Per Game	Matthew Tkachuk	1.24	Matthew Tkachuk	1.24
Shots on goal	Aleksander Barkov	1,948	Aleksander Barkov	1,948
Best plus/minus	Gustav Forsling	+133	Gustav Forsling	+133
Penalty minutes	Paul Laus	1,702	Aaron Ekblad	452
Goaltender games	Roberto Luongo	572	Sergei Bobrovsky	243
Goaltender wins	Roberto Luongo	230	Sergei Bobrovsky	141
Shutouts	Roberto Luongo	38	Sergei Bobrovsky	11
Saves	Roberto Luongo	16,086	Sergei Bobrovsky	6,400
Goals against average^{‡}	Tomáš Vokoun	2.57	Sergei Bobrovsky	2.82
Save percentage^{‡}	Tomáš Vokoun	.923	Sergei Bobrovsky	.907

^{†}As of July 7, 2024

^{‡}Minimum 75 games played with the franchise

=== Playoff records ===
	Career leader		Active leader^{†}	
Games	Aleksander Barkov	71	Aleksander Barkov	71
Goals	Carter Verhaeghe	26	Carter Verhaeghe	26
Assists	Aleksander Barkov	40	Aleksander Barkov	40
Points	Aleksander Barkov	59	Aleksander Barkov	59
Goaltender games	Sergei Bobrovsky	60	Sergei Bobrovsky	60
Goaltender wins	Sergei Bobrovsky	34	Sergei Bobrovsky	34
Shutouts	Sergei Bobrovsky	3	Sergei Bobrovsky	3
Saves	Sergei Bobrovsky	1,551	Sergei Bobrovsky	1,551
Goals against average^{‡}	John Vanbiesbrouck	2.28	Sergei Bobrovsky	2.68
Save percentage^{‡}	John Vanbiesbrouck	.931	Sergei Bobrovsky	.908

As of July 7, 2024

^{‡}Minimum 10 playoff games played with the franchise

== Single season records ==
=== Team ===
	Total	Year
Most wins	58	2021-22
Fewest wins^{†}	22	2000–01
Most defeats	45	2013–14
Fewest defeats^{†}	18	2021-22
Most ties	19	1996–97
Fewest ties	6	1994–95; 1999-00
Most points	122	2021-22
Fewest points^{†}	60	2001–02
Most goals for	340	2021–22
Fewest goals for^{†}	176	2002–03
Most goals against	280	2018–19
Fewest goals against^{†}	200	2023–24
Most penalty minutes	1968	2001–02

^{†}Excluding the lockout-shortened 1994–95 and 2012–13 NHL seasons.

=== Skaters ===
	Player	Total	Year
Goals	Pavel Bure	59	2000–01
Power play goals	Sam Reinhart	27	2023–24
Short-handed goals	Tom Fitzgerald	6	1995–96
Game-winning goals	Pavel Bure	14	1999-00
Assists	Jonathan Huberdeau	85	2021-22
Points	Jonathan Huberdeau	115	2021-22
Shots on goal	Pavel Bure	384	2000–01
Plus/minus	Gustav Forsling	+53	2023-24
Penalties in minutes	Peter Worrell	354	2001–02

=== Goalies ===
	Player	Total	Year
Games played	Roberto Luongo	75	2005–06
Wins	Sergei Bobrovsky	39	2021–22
Shutouts	Roberto Luongo; Tomas Vokoun	7; 7	2003–04; 2009–10
Saves	Roberto Luongo	2303	2003–04
Save percentage	Roberto Luongo	0.931	2003–04
Goals against average	John Vanbiesbrouck	2.29	1996–97

== Single game records ==
=== Team ===
	Total	Date
Goals	10	Nov. 26, 1997; Florida 10, Boston 5
Goals against	12	Jan. 11, 2003; Florida 2, Washington 12
Points	26	Nov. 26, 1997; Florida 10, Boston 5
Goals, one period	7	Mar. 17, 2023; Florida 7, Montreal 3
Power play goals, one period	4	Dec. 9, 1998; Florida 4, Ottawa
Power play goals	5	Oct. 25, 1996; Florida 6, N.Y. Rangers 4 Dec. 9. 1998; Florida 6, Ottawa 5 Oct. 17, 2011; Florida 7, Tampa Bay 4
Power play goals against	5	Jan. 19, 2006; Florida 3, Phoenix 6 Apr. 11, 2006; Florida 5, Toronto 6 Oct. 23, 2006; Florida 3, Atlanta 6
Short-handed goals	2	Oct. 13, 1995; Florida 6, Ottawa 2 Apr. 8, 1996; Florida 5, N.Y. Rangers 3 Oct. 4, 1997; Florida 5, Pittsburgh 3 Dec. 12, 1997; Florida 4, N.Y. Rangers 3 Dec. 30, 1998; Florida 4, Pittsburgh 7 Nov. 19, 2002; Florida 3, Atlanta 4
Short-handed goals against	3	Mar. 19, 1998; Florida 1, Buffalo 6 Nov. 18, 2000; Florida 2, Ottawa 5
Shots on goal	55	Nov. 3, 2010; Florida 3, Atlanta 4 Dec. 4, 2014; Florida 3, Columbus 4
Shots against	60	Feb. 27, 2002; Florida 2, Detroit 3
Penalty minutes	128	Oct. 13, 2001; Florida 2, Philadelphia 5
