= List of Vancouver Canucks records =

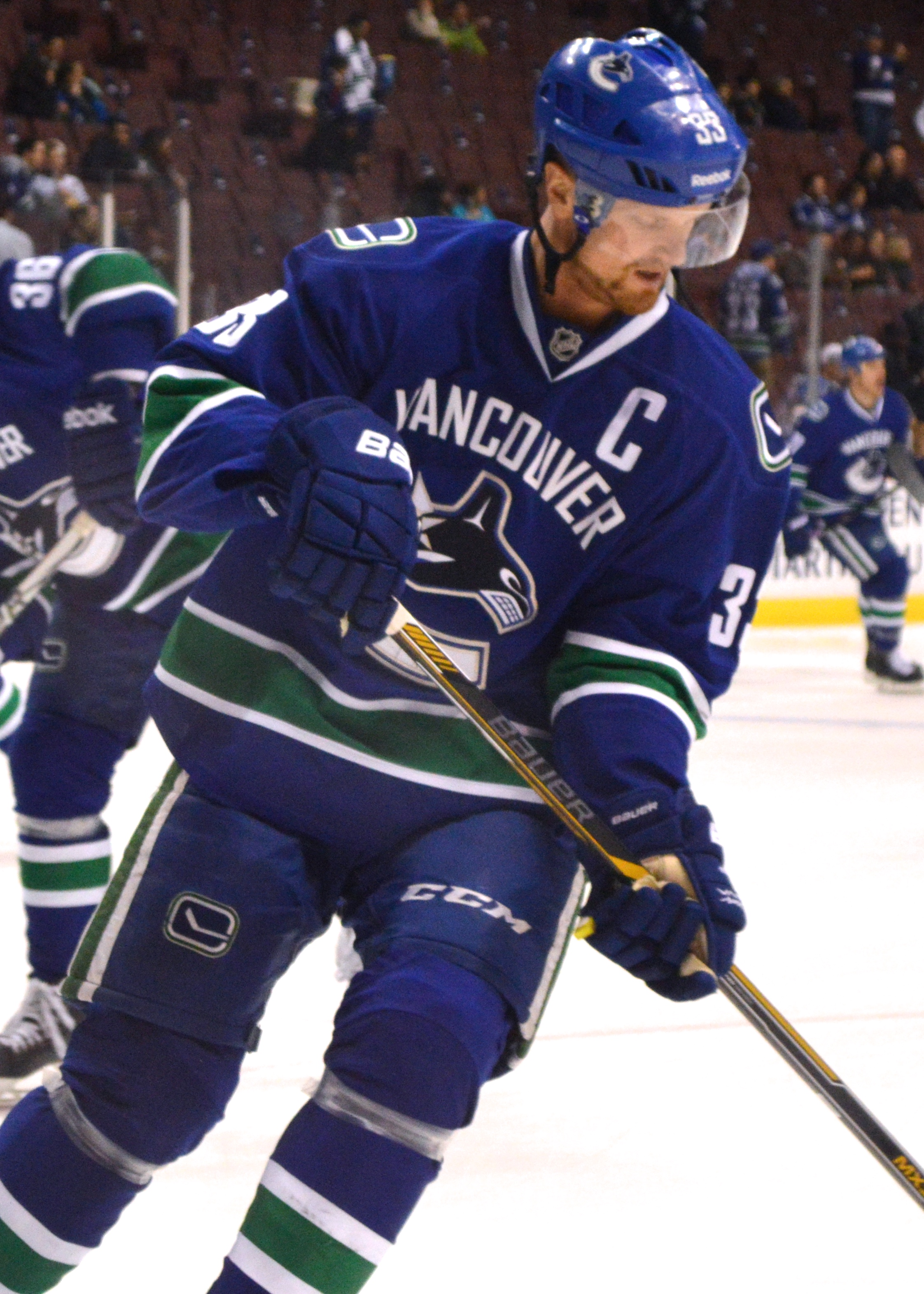
Henrik Sedin is the all-time leader in assists, points, games played, and consecutive games played.

This is a list of franchise records for the Vancouver Canucks of the National Hockey League, which dates from the 1970–71 season to present.

== Regular season ==
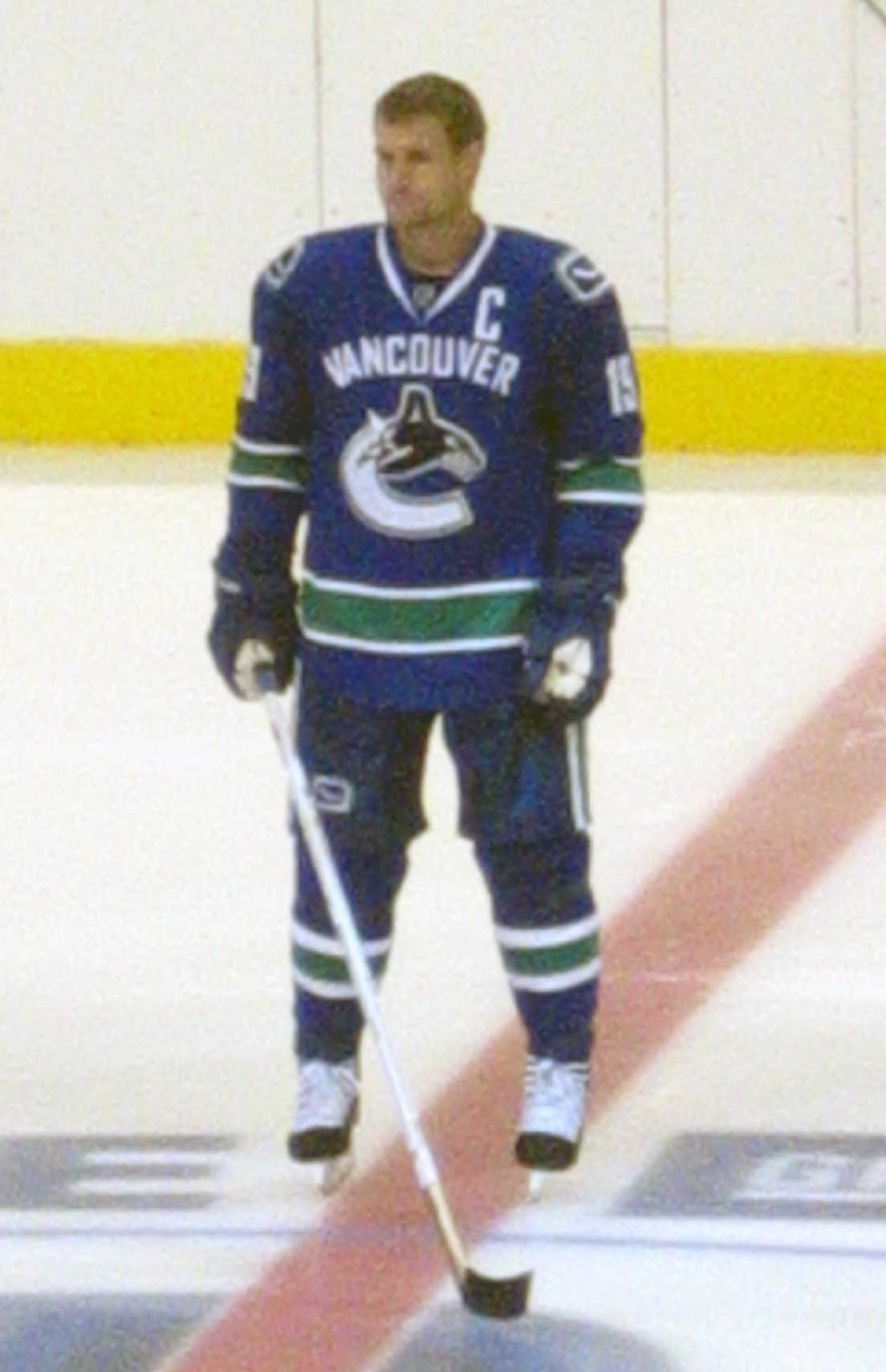
Markus Naslund was the all-time leader in points from 2007–08 until 2012-13. He continues to rank top-3 in most offensive statistics.

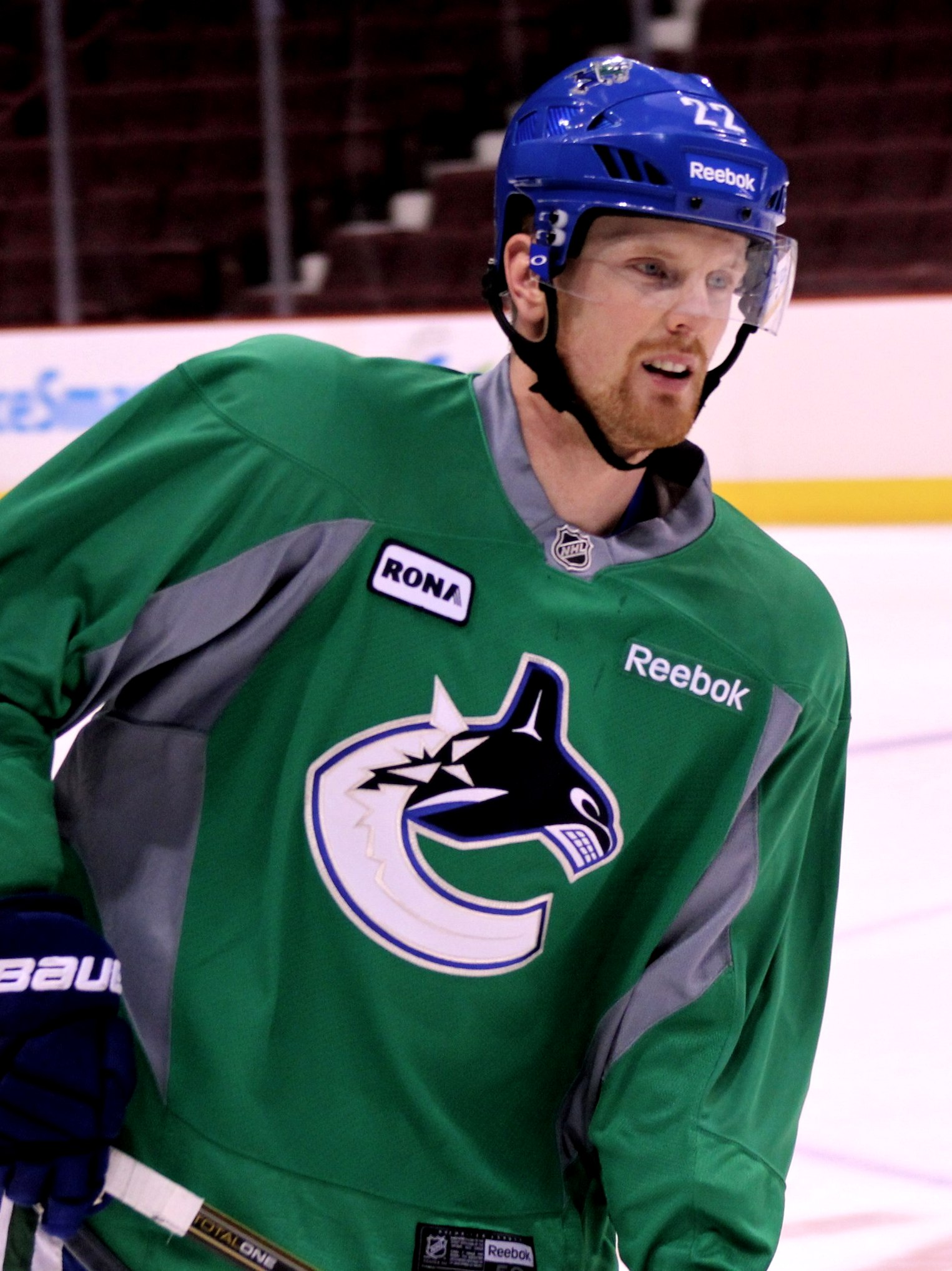
Daniel Sedin holds most goal-scoring records for the team.

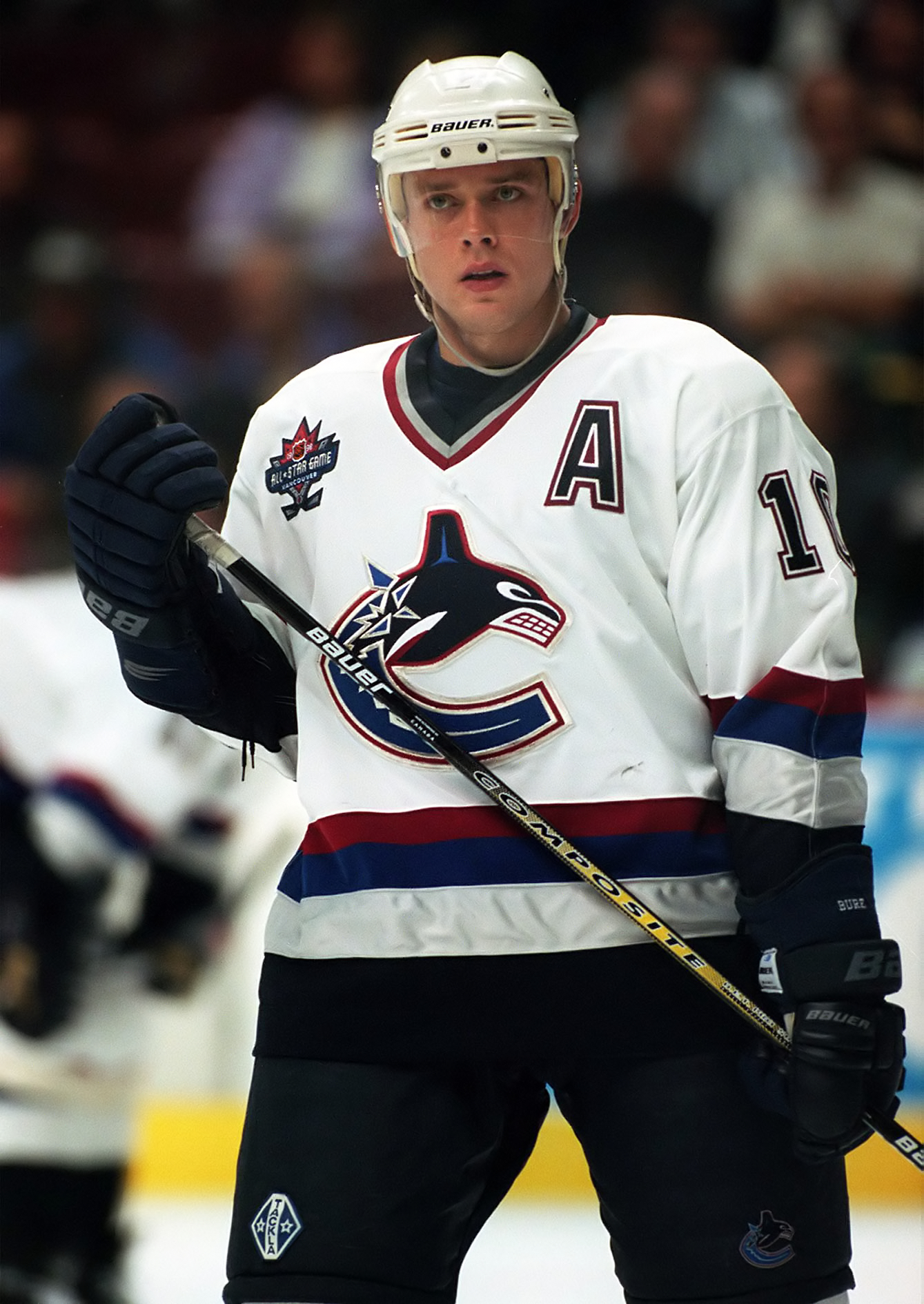
Pavel Bure, the franchise leader in points-per-game and goals-per-game, scored nine hat-tricks and 24 short-handed goals as a Canuck.

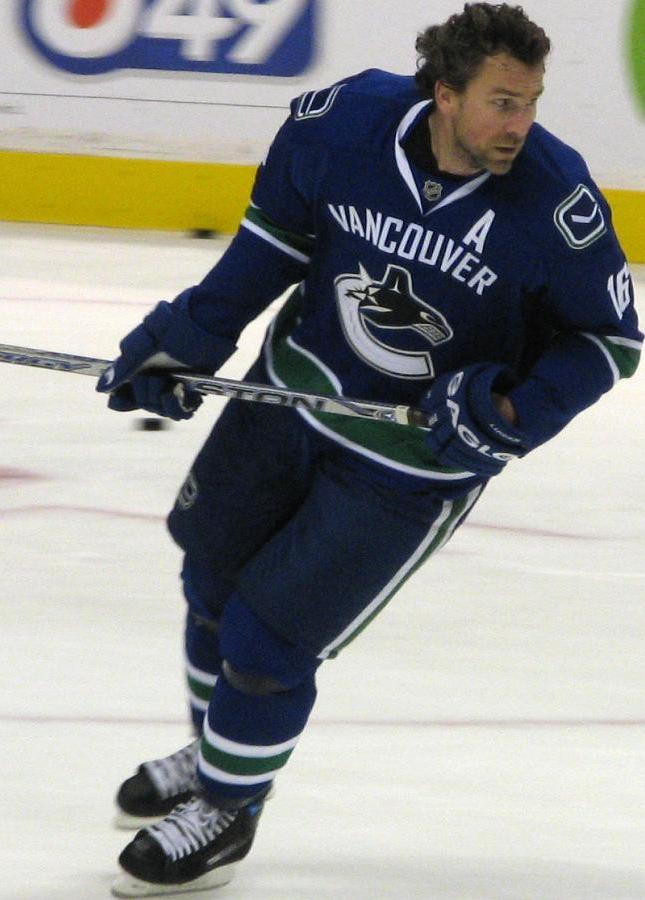
Trevor Linden was the first player to play over 1,000 games in a Canucks uniform. He ranks top-4 in most regular season statistics, and is the franchise-leader in playoff games, goals, assists, powerplay goals, and short-handed goals.

=== All players ===
==== Points ====
Player	Ctry	Pos	GP	Pts	%
Henrik Sedin	(Sweden)	C	1,330	1,070	0.805
Daniel Sedin	(Sweden)	LW	1,306	1,041	0.797
Markus Naslund	(Sweden)	LW	884	756	0.86
Trevor Linden	(Canada)	RW/C	1,138	733	0.64
Stan Smyl	(Canada)	RW	896	673	0.75
Thomas Gradin	(Sweden)	C	613	550	0.90
Pavel Bure	(Russia)	RW	428	478	1.12
Tony Tanti	(Canada)	RW	531	470	0.89
Elias Pettersson	(Sweden)	C	471	457	0.97
Todd Bertuzzi	(Canada)	RW	518	449	0.87

==== Goals ====
Player	Ctry	Pos	GP	G	%
Daniel Sedin	(Sweden)	LW	1,306	393	0.30
Markus Naslund	(Sweden)	LW	884	346	0.39
Trevor Linden	(Canada)	RW/C	1,138	318	0.28
Stan Smyl	(Canada)	RW	896	262	0.29
Pavel Bure	(Russia)	RW	428	254	0.59
Tony Tanti	(Canada)	RW	531	250	0.47
Henrik Sedin	(Sweden)	C	1,330	240	0.18
Brock Boeser	(United States)	RW	554	204	0.37
Bo Horvat	(Canada)	C	621	201	0.32
Thomas Gradin	(Sweden)	C	613	197	0.32

==== Assists ====
Player	Ctry	Pos	GP	A	%
Henrik Sedin	(Sweden)	C	1,330	830	0.62
Daniel Sedin	(Sweden)	LW	1,306	648	0.50
Trevor Linden	(Canada)	RW/C	1,138	415	0.37
Stan Smyl	(Canada)	RW	896	411	0.46
Markus Naslund	(Sweden)	LW	884	410	0.46
Quinn Hughes	(United States)	D	459	371	0.81
Thomas Gradin	(Sweden)	C	613	353	0.58
Alexander Edler	(Sweden)	D	925	310	0.34
Dennis Kearns	(Canada)	D	677	290	0.43
J.T. Miller	(United States)	C/RW	404	285	0.70

==== Games played ====
Player	Ctry	Pos	GP
Henrik Sedin	(Sweden)	C	1,330
Daniel Sedin	(Sweden)	LW	1,306
Trevor Linden	(Canada)	RW/C	1,140
Alexander Edler	(Sweden)	D	925
Stan Smyl	(Canada)	RW	896
Markus Naslund	(Sweden)	LW	884
Alex Burrows	(Canada)	LW	822
Harold Snepsts	(Canada)	D	784
Mattias Ohlund	(Sweden)	D	770
Dennis Kearns	(Canada)	D	677

==== Major penalties ====
Player	Ctry	Pos	Majors	GP	Majors/G
Gino Odjick	(Canada)	LW	137	444	0.31
Garth Butcher	(Canada)	D	100	610	0.16
Donald Brashear	(United States)	LW	85	388	0.22
Dave "Tiger" Williams	(Canada)	LW	72	312	0.23
Harold Snepsts	(Canada)	D	58	781	0.07
Stan Smyl	(Canada)	RW	52	896	0.06
Curt Fraser	(United States)	LW	49	348	0.14
Jason Strudwick	(Canada)	D	47	243	0.19
Kevin Bieksa	(Canada)	D	43	597	0.07
Ronnie Stern	(Canada)	RW	42	97	0.43

==== Minor penalties ====
Player	Ctry	Pos	Minors	GP	Minors/G
Stan Smyl	(Canada)	RW	435	896	0.48
Garth Butcher	(Canada)	D	433	610	0.71
Harold Snepsts	(Canada)	D	361	781	0.46
Alex Burrows	(Canada)	LW	347	822	0.42
Henrik Sedin	(Sweden)	C	338	1330	0.25
Mattias Ohlund	(Sweden)	D	337	770	0.44
Gino Odjick	(Canada)	LW	327	444	0.74
Alexander Edler	(Sweden)	D	313	925	0.34
Todd Bertuzzi	(Canada)	RW	306	518	0.59
Markus Naslund	(Sweden)	LW	302	884	0.34

==== Hat-tricks ====
Player	Ctry	Pos	Hat-tricks
Tony Tanti	(Canada)	RW	10
Markus Naslund	(Sweden)	LW	10
Pavel Bure	(Russia)	RW	9
Brock Boeser	(United States)	RW	7
Stan Smyl	(Canada)	RW	7
Daniel Sedin	(Sweden)	LW	6
Petri Skriko	(Finland)	LW	5
Todd Bertuzzi	(Canada)	RW	5
Trevor Linden	(Canada)	C/RW	4
Thomas Gradin	(Sweden)	C	4
Bobby Schmautz	(Canada)	LW	4
Alexander Mogilny	(Russia)	RW	4
Darcy Rota	(Canada)	LW	4

==== Game-winning goals ====
Player	Ctry	Pos	GWG
Daniel Sedin	(Sweden)	LW	86
Markus Naslund	(Sweden)	LW	49
Henrik Sedin	(Sweden)	C	38
Elias Pettersson	(Sweden)	C	33
Trevor Linden	(Canada)	C/RW	33
Pavel Bure	(Russia)	RW	32
Brendan Morrison	(Canada)	C	30
Tony Tanti	(Canada)	RW	29
Brock Boeser	(United States)	RW	28
Alexandre Burrows	(Canada)	LW	28

==== Power-play goals ====
Player	Ctry	Pos	PP
Daniel Sedin	(Sweden)	LW	138
Markus Naslund	(Sweden)	LW	114
Tony Tanti	(Canada)	RW	102
Trevor Linden	(Canada)	C/RW	97
Todd Bertuzzi	(Canada)	RW	79
Stan Smyl	(Canada)	RW	74
Brock Boeser	(United States)	RW	73
Pavel Bure	(Russia)	RW	69
Bo Horvat	(Canada)	C	67
Greg Adams	(Canada)	LW	65

==== Short-handed goals ====
Player	Ctry	Pos	SH
Pavel Bure	(Russia)	RW	24
Alexandre Burrows	(Canada)	LW	17
Trevor Linden	(Canada)	C/RW	15
Stan Smyl	(Canada)	RW	13
Alexander Mogilny	(Russia)	RW	13
Petri Skriko	(Finland)	LW	11
Bo Horvat	(Canada)	C	11
Ryan Kesler	(United States)	C	10
J.T. Miller	(United States)	C/RW	8
Matt Cooke	(Canada)	LW	8

==== Overtime goals ====
Player	Ctry	Pos	OT
Daniel Sedin	(Sweden)	LW	16
J.T. Miller	(United States)	C/RW	10
Brendan Morrison	(Canada)	C	9
Elias Pettersson	(Sweden)	C	7
Sami Salo	(Finland)	D	7
Mattias Ohlund	(Sweden)	D	6
Henrik Sedin	(Sweden)	C	6
Geoff Courtnall	(Canada)	LW	5
Bo Horvat	(Canada)	C	5
Markus Naslund	(Sweden)	LW	5

==== Consecutive games played ====
Player	Ctry	Pos	GP
Henrik Sedin	(Sweden)	C	679
Brendan Morrison	(Canada)	C	534
Trevor Linden	(Canada)	C	482
Don Lever	(Canada)	LW	437
Daniel Sedin	(Sweden)	LW	300
Alex Burrows	(Canada)	LW	290
Ryan Kesler	(United States)	C	290
Bo Horvat	(Canada)	C	281
Dennis Kearns	(Canada)	D	245
Gerry O'Flaherty	(United States)	LW	237

*denotes active streak

=== Defencemen ===
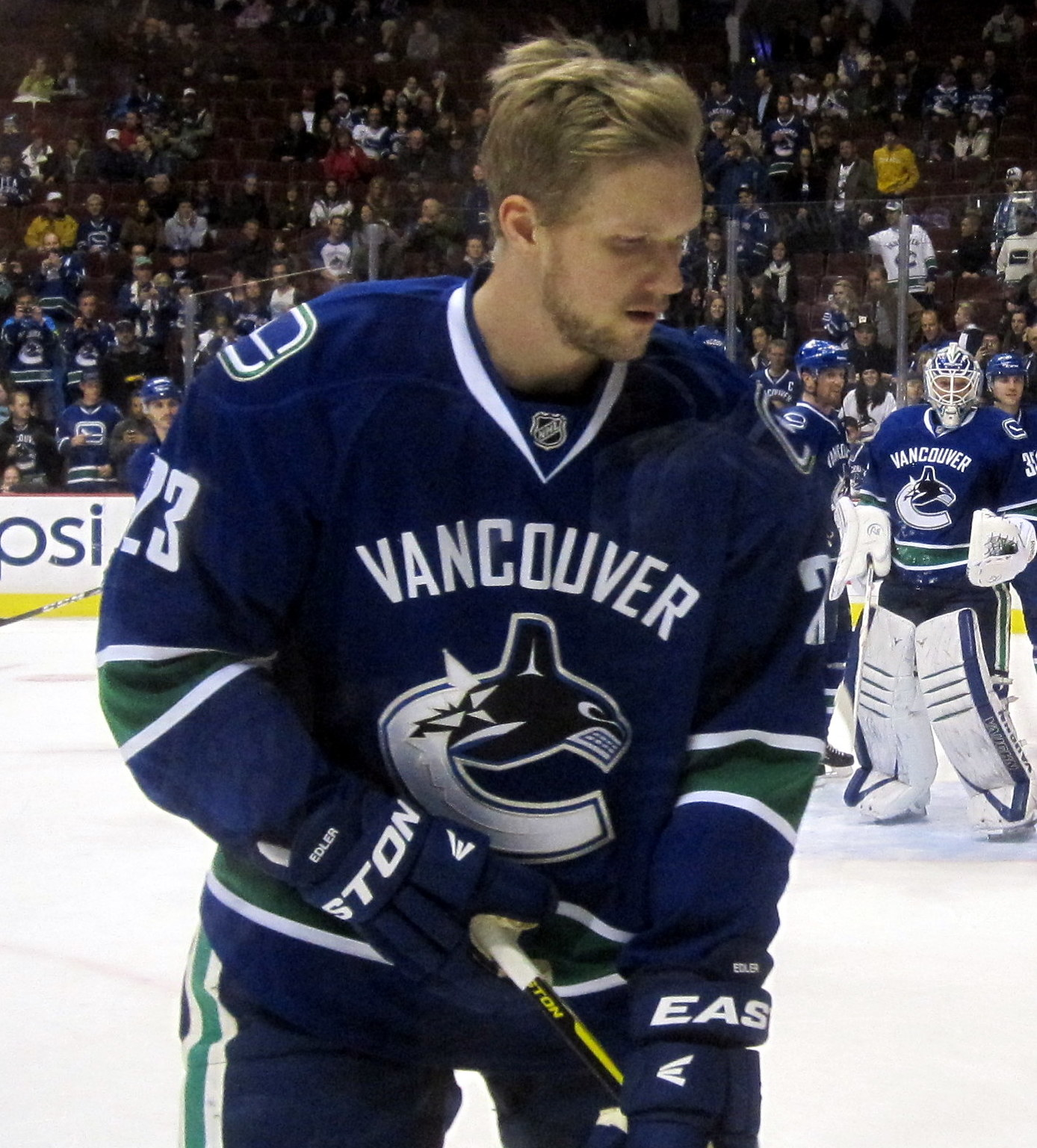
Alexander Edler became the all-time leader in points among Canucks defensemen in 2018-19.

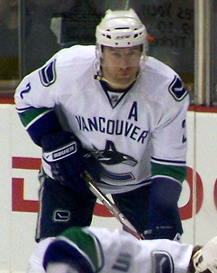
Mattias Ohlund had been the highest-scoring defenseman in Canucks history for over a decade.

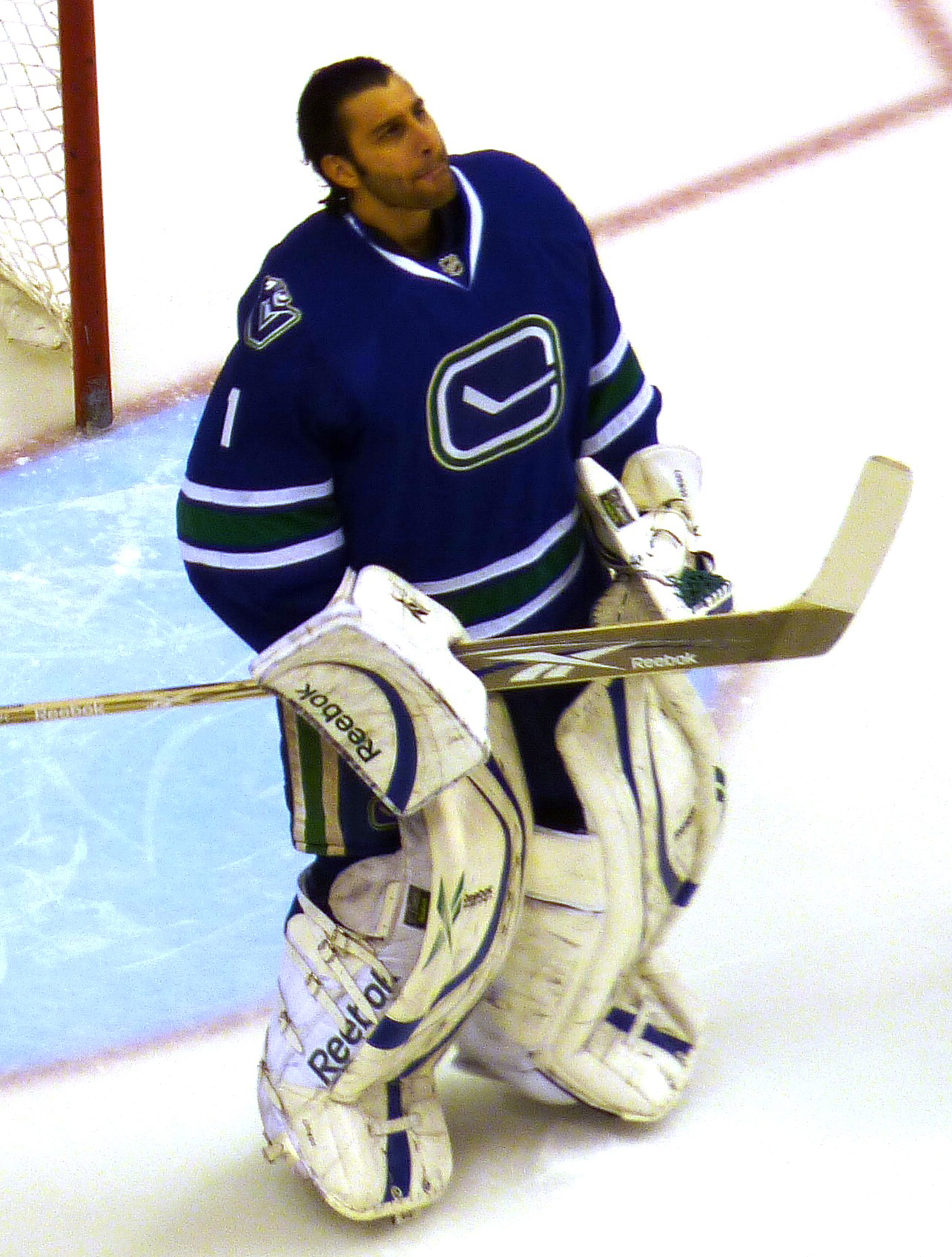
Roberto Luongo ranks in the top-four in every major goaltending statistic in both the regular-season and the playoffs for the Canucks.

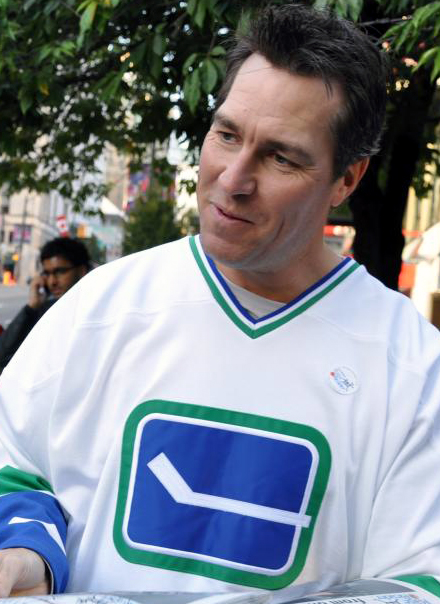
Kirk McLean is the franchise leader in playoff games played and wins.

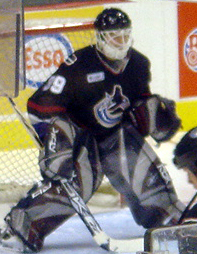
Dan Cloutier ranks top-5 in most goaltending categories for the Canucks.

==== Points ====
Player	Ctry	GP	Pts	%
Quinn Hughes	(United States)	459	432	0.94
Alexander Edler	(Sweden)	925	409	0.44
Mattias Ohlund	(Sweden)	770	325	0.42
Jyrki Lumme	(Finland)	579	321	0.55
Dennis Kearns	(Canada)	677	321	0.47
Doug Lidster	(Canada)	666	307	0.46
Kevin Bieksa	(Canada)	597	241	0.40
Sami Salo	(Finland)	566	236	0.42
Ed Jovanovski	(Canada)	434	234	0.54
Rick Lanz	(Czech Republic)	417	227	0.54

=== Goaltenders ===
==== Games played ====
Player	Ctry	GP
Kirk McLean	(Canada)	516
Roberto Luongo	(Canada)	448
Richard Brodeur	(Canada)	377
Thatcher Demko	(United States)	242
Jacob Markstrom	(Sweden)	229
Dan Cloutier	(Canada)	208
Gary Smith	(Canada)	189
Ryan Miller	(United States)	150
Dunc Wilson	(Canada)	148
Glen Hanlon	(Canada)	136

==== Wins ====
Player	Ctry	GP	W	%
Roberto Luongo	(Canada)	448	252	0.56
Kirk McLean	(Canada)	516	211	0.41
Thatcher Demko	(United States)	242	126	0.52
Richard Brodeur	(Canada)	377	126	0.33
Dan Cloutier	(Canada)	208	109	0.52
Jacob Markstrom	(Sweden)	229	99	0.43
Gary Smith	(Canada)	189	72	0.38
Ryan Miller	(United States)	150	64	0.43
Cory Schneider	(United States)	98	55	0.56
Glen Hanlon	(Canada)	137	43	0.31

==== Shutouts ====
Player	Ctry	GP	SO	%
Roberto Luongo	(Canada)	448	38	0.08
Kirk McLean	(Canada)	516	20	0.04
Dan Cloutier	(Canada)	208	14	0.07
Gary Smith	(Canada)	189	11	0.06
Ryan Miller	(United States)	150	10	0.06
Cory Schneider	(United States)	98	9	0.09
Thatcher Demko	(United States)	242	9	0.04
Eddie Lack	(Sweden)	82	6	0.07
Garth Snow	(United States)	109	6	0.06
Richard Brodeur	(Canada)	377	6	0.02

==== Goals against average ====
Player	Ctry	GP	GAA
Cory Schneider	(United States)	98	2.20
Roberto Luongo	(Canada)	448	2.36
Dan Cloutier	(Canada)	208	2.42
Eddie Lack	(Sweden)	82	2.43
Kevin Lankinen	(Finland)	51	2.62
Ryan Miller	(United States)	150	2.69
Jacob Markstrom	(Sweden)	229	2.73
Alex Auld	(Canada)	81	2.75
Thatcher Demko	(United States)	242	2.80
Felix Potvin	(Canada)	69	2.84

*minimum 50 games played

==== Save percentage ====
Player	Ctry	GP	SV%
Cory Schneider	(United States)	98	.927
Roberto Luongo	(Canada)	448	.919
Eddie Lack	(Sweden)	82	.916
Ryan Miller	(United States)	150	.914
Jacob Markstrom	(Sweden)	229	.913
Thatcher Demko	(United States)	242	.910
Alex Auld	(Canada)	81	.907
Dan Cloutier	(Canada)	208	.906
Kevin Lankinen	(Finland)	51	.902
Garth Snow	(United States)	109	.901

*minimum 50 games played

=== Coaches ===
Coach	Ctry	GC	ROW	%
Alain Vigneault	(Canada)	540	278	0.51
Marc Crawford	(Canada)	529	242	0.46
Harry Neale	(Canada)	407	142	0.35
Pat Quinn	(Canada)	280	141	0.50
Travis Green	(Canada)	314	119	0.38
Rick Tocchet	(Canada)	200	102	0.51
Bob McCammon	(Canada)	294	102	0.35
Phil Maloney	(Canada)	232	95	0.41
Willie Desjardins	(Canada)	246	94	0.38
Tom Watt	(Canada)	160	52	0.33

*for the purpose of comparison, shootout wins are excluded

== Playoffs ==
=== All players ===
==== Points ====
Player	Ctry	Pos	GP	Pts	PPG
Trevor Linden	(Canada)	RW/C	118	95	0.80
Henrik Sedin	(Sweden)	C	105	78	0.74
Daniel Sedin	(Sweden)	LW	102	71	0.70
Pavel Bure	(Russia)	RW	60	66	1.10
Geoff Courtnall	(Canada)	LW	65	61	0.93
Cliff Ronning	(Canada)	C	72	58	0.80
Jyrki Lumme	(Finland)	D	72	40	0.55
Thomas Gradin	(Sweden)	C	38	38	1.00
Ryan Kesler	(United States)	C	57	38	0.67
Alexander Edler	(Sweden)	D	82	38	0.46

==== Goals ====
Player	Ctry	Pos	GP	G	%
Pavel Bure	(Russia)	RW	60	34	0.56
Trevor Linden	(Canada)	RW/C	118	34	0.28
Geoff Courtnall	(Canada)	LW	65	26	0.40
Daniel Sedin	(Sweden)	LW	102	25	0.25
Cliff Ronning	(Canada)	C	72	24	0.33
Henrik Sedin	(Sweden)	C	105	23	0.22
Alexandre Burrows	(Canada)	LW	70	19	0.27
Thomas Gradin	(Sweden)	C	38	17	0.44
Stan Smyl	(Canada)	RW	41	16	0.39
Greg Adams	(Canada)	LW	53	15	0.28

==== Assists ====
Player	Ctry	Pos	GP	A	%
Trevor Linden	(Canada)	RW/C	118	61	0.51
Henrik Sedin	(Sweden)	C	105	55	0.52
Daniel Sedin	(Sweden)	LW	102	46	0.45
Geoff Courtnall	(Canada)	LW	65	35	0.53
Cliff Ronning	(Canada)	C	72	34	0.47
Pavel Bure	(Russia)	RW	60	32	0.53
Jyrki Lumme	(Finland)	D	72	31	0.43
Alexander Edler	(Sweden)	D	82	30	0.37
Ryan Kesler	(United States)	C	57	26	0.46
Quinn Hughes	(United States)	D	30	24	0.55

==== Games played ====
Player	Ctry	Pos	GP
Trevor Linden	(Canada)	RW/C	118
Henrik Sedin	(Sweden)	C	105
Daniel Sedin	(Sweden)	LW	102
Alexander Edler	(Sweden)	D	82
Sami Salo	(Finland)	D	74
Jyrki Lumme	(Finland)	D	72
Cliff Ronning	(Canada)	C	72
Alexandre Burrows	(Canada)	LW	70
Kevin Bieksa	(Canada)	D	70
Sergio Momesso	(Canada)	LW	66

==== Penalty minutes ====
Player	Ctry	Pos	PIM
Tiger Williams	(Canada)	LW	181
Sergio Momesso	(Canada)	LW	157
Alexandre Burrows	(Canada)	LW	124
Kevin Bieksa	(Canada)	D	122
Geoff Courtnall	(Canada)	LW	121
Curt Fraser	(United States)	LW	108
Harold Snepsts	(Canada)	D	99
Colin Campbell	(Canada)	D	98
Gino Odjick	(Canada)	LW	95
Dana Murzyn	(Canada)	D	92

==== Hat-tricks ====
Player	Ctry	Pos	Hat-tricks
Geoff Courtnall	(Canada)	LW	2
Doug Halward	(Canada)	D	1
Brock Boeser	(United States)	RW	1
Pavel Bure	(Russia)	RW	1
Trevor Linden	(Canada)	C/RW	1

==== Game-winning goals ====
Player	Ctry	Pos	GWG
Cliff Ronning	(Canada)	C	7
Geoff Courtnall	(Canada)	LW	6
Daniel Sedin	(Sweden)	LW	6
Trevor Linden	(Canada)	C/RW	5
Chris Higgins	(United States)	LW	4
Henrik Sedin	(Sweden)	C	4
Greg Adams	(Canada)	LW	3
Pavel Bure	(Russia)	RW	3
Alexandre Burrows	(Canada)	LW	3
Kevin Bieksa	(Canada)	D	3

==== Power-play goals ====
Player	Ctry	Pos	PP
Trevor Linden	(Canada)	C/RW	15
Daniel Sedin	(Sweden)	LW	10
Henrik Sedin	(Sweden)	C	10
Greg Adams	(Canada)	LW	7
Sami Salo	(Finland)	D	7
Markus Naslund	(Sweden)	LW	6
Ryan Kesler	(United States)	C	6
Geoff Courtnall	(Canada)	LW	6
Cliff Ronning	(Canada)	C	6
Jyrki Lumme	(Finland)	D	6

==== Short-handed goals ====
Player	Ctry	Pos	SH
Trevor Linden	(Canada)	C/RW	3
Pavel Bure	(Russia)	RW	2
Geoff Courtnall	(Canada)	LW	2
Russ Courtnall	(Canada)	RW	2
John Gould	(Canada)	RW	1
Christian Ruutu	(Finland)	C	1
Robert Kron	(Czech Republic)	C	1
Tyler Motte	(United States)	C	1
Bo Horvat	(Canada)	C	1
Ed Jovanovski	(Canada)	D	1

==== Overtime goals ====
Player	Ctry	Pos	OT
Greg Adams	(Canada)	LW	3
Alexandre Burrows	(Canada)	LW	3
Cliff Ronning	(Canada)	C	2
Henrik Sedin	(Sweden)	C	2
Paul Reinhart	(Canada)	D	1
Jeff Cowan	(Canada)	LW	1
Elias Lindholm	(Sweden)	C	1
Taylor Pyatt	(Canada)	LW	1
Trent Klatt	(United States)	RW	1
Colin Campbell	(Canada)	D	1

=== Defencemen ===
==== Points ====
Player	Ctry	GP	Pts	%
Jyrki Lumme	(Finland)	72	40	0.55
Alexander Edler	(Sweden)	82	38	0.46
Mattias Ohlund	(Sweden)	52	28	0.53
Dave Babych	(Canada)	60	27	0.45
Quinn Hughes	(United States)	30	26	0.87
Sami Salo	(Finland)	74	26	0.35
Kevin Bieksa	(Canada)	71	25	0.35
Ed Jovanovski	(Canada)	31	19	0.61
Jeff Brown	(Canada)	29	19	0.65
Christian Ehrhoff	(Germany)	35	19	0.54

=== Goaltenders ===
==== Games played ====
Player	Ctry	GP
Kirk McLean	(Canada)	68
Roberto Luongo	(Canada)	64
Richard Brodeur	(Canada)	29
Dan Cloutier	(Canada)	25
Jacob Markstrom	(Sweden)	14
Arturs Silovs	(Latvia)	10
Cory Schneider	(United States)	10
Gary Bromley	(Canada)	7
Corey Hirsch	(Canada)	6
Thatcher Demko	(United States)	5

==== Wins ====
Player	Ctry	GP	W	%
Kirk McLean	(Canada)	68	34	0.50
Roberto Luongo	(Canada)	64	32	0.50
Richard Brodeur	(Canada)	29	12	0.41
Dan Cloutier	(Canada)	25	10	0.40
Jacob Markstrom	(Sweden)	14	8	0.57
Arturs Silovs	(Latvia)	10	5	0.50
Thatcher Demko	(United States)	5	3	0.60
Corey Hirsch	(Canada)	6	2	0.33
Gary Bromley	(Canada)	7	2	0.29
Johan Hedberg	(Sweden)	2	1	0.50

==== Goals against average ====
Player	Ctry	GP	GAA
Thatcher Demko	(United States)	5	0.97
Casey DeSmith	(United States)	2	2.02
Ryan Miller	(United States)	3	2.31
Alex Auld	(Canada)	4	2.48
Roberto Luongo	(Canada)	64	2.54
Cory Schneider	(United States)	10	2.59
Kirk McLean	(Canada)	68	2.84
Jacob Markstrom	(Sweden)	14	2.85
Arturs Silovs	(Latvia)	10	2.91
Bob Essensa	(Canada)	2	2.95

*minimum 100 minutes played

==== Save percentage ====
Player	Ctry	GP	SV%
Thatcher Demko	(United States)	5	.974
Cory Schneider	(United States)	10	.922
Jacob Markstrom	(Sweden)	14	.919
Roberto Luongo	(Canada)	64	.916
Casey DeSmith	(United States)	2	.911
Ryan Miller	(United States)	3	.910
Kirk McLean	(Canada)	68	.907
Gary Smith	(Canada)	4	.905
Steve Weeks	(Canada)	3	.899
Arturs Silovs	(Latvia)	10	.898

*minimum 100 minutes played

==== Shutouts ====
Player	Ctry	GP	SO	%
Kirk McLean	(Canada)	68	6	0.09
Roberto Luongo	(Canada)	61	5	0.08
Thatcher Demko	(United States)	5	1	0.20
Arturs Silovs	(Latvia)	10	1	0.10
Jacob Markstrom	(Sweden)	14	1	0.07
Richard Brodeur	(Canada)	29	1	0.03

=== Coaches ===
Coach	Ctry	GC	W	%
Alain Vigneault	(Canada)	68	33	0.49
Pat Quinn	(Canada)	61	31	0.50
Roger Neilson	(Canada)	21	12	0.57
Marc Crawford	(Canada)	27	12	0.44
Travis Green	(Canada)	17	10	0.59
Rick Tocchet	(Canada)	13	7	0.54
Rick Ley	(Canada)	11	4	0.36
Bob McCammon	(Canada)	7	3	0.43
Harry Neale	(Canada)	14	3	0.21
Willie Desjardins	(Canada)	6	2	0.33

== Single season records ==
=== Regular season ===
==== Team ====
- Most wins by team: 54 in 2010–11 (coached by Alain Vigneault)
- Most losses by team: 50 in 1971–72
- Most points by team: 117 in 2010–11
- Most goals by team: 346 in 1992–93
- Fewest goals by team: 182 in 2016-17
- Most goals against by team: 401 in 1984–85
- Fewest goals against by team: 185 in 2010–11

==== Players ====
- Most goals: Pavel Bure, 60 (twice; 1992–93, 1993–94)
- Most assists: Henrik Sedin, 83 (2009–10)
- Most points: Henrik Sedin, 112 (2009–10)
- Most PIM: Donald Brashear, 372 (1997–98)
- Most points, Defenceman: Quinn Hughes, 92 (2023-24)
- Most points, Rookie: Elias Pettersson, 66 (2018–19)

==== Goalies ====
- Most games played: Roberto Luongo, 76 (2006–07)
- Most minutes: Roberto Luongo, 4,490 (2006–07)
- Most wins: Roberto Luongo, 47 (2006–07)
- Most shutouts: Roberto Luongo, 9 (2008–09)
- Longest shutout streak: Roberto Luongo, 242:36 (2008–09)

---For next 2 records goalie must play at least 30 games

- Lowest GAA: Cory Schneider, 1.96 (2011–12)
- Highest save %: Cory Schneider, .937 (2011–12)

=== Playoffs ===
==== Team ====
- Most wins by team: 15, 1994 (coached by Pat Quinn); 2011 (coached by Alain Vigneault)
- Most goals by team: 76 in 1994
- Most goals against by team: 69 in 2011
- Longest game: 138:06 (April 11, 2007, Round 1, Game 1 against Dallas Stars. Henrik Sedin scored winning goal.)

==== Players ====
- Most goals: Pavel Bure, 16 (1993–94)
- Most points: Pavel Bure, 31 (1993–94)
- Most assists: Henrik Sedin, 19 (2010–11)
- Most PIM: Tiger Williams, 116 (1981–82)
- Most points, defenceman: Quinn Hughes, 16 (2019-20)

==== Goalies ====
- Most games played: Roberto Luongo, 25 (2011)
- Most wins: Kirk McLean, 15 (1994) and Roberto Luongo, 15 (2011)
- Most shutouts: Kirk McLean, 4 (1994) and Roberto Luongo, 4 (2011)
- Longest shutout streak: Kirk McLean, 143:17 (1994)
- Lowest GAA: Thatcher Demko, 0.64 (2020)
- Highest save %: Thatcher Demko, .985 (2020)
- Most shots faced in one game: Roberto Luongo, 76 (2007)
- Most saves in one game: Roberto Luongo, 72 (2007)

== See also ==
- List of NHL players
