= Pavel Bure =

Russian ice hockey player (born 1971)

- Hockey Hall of Fame, 2012
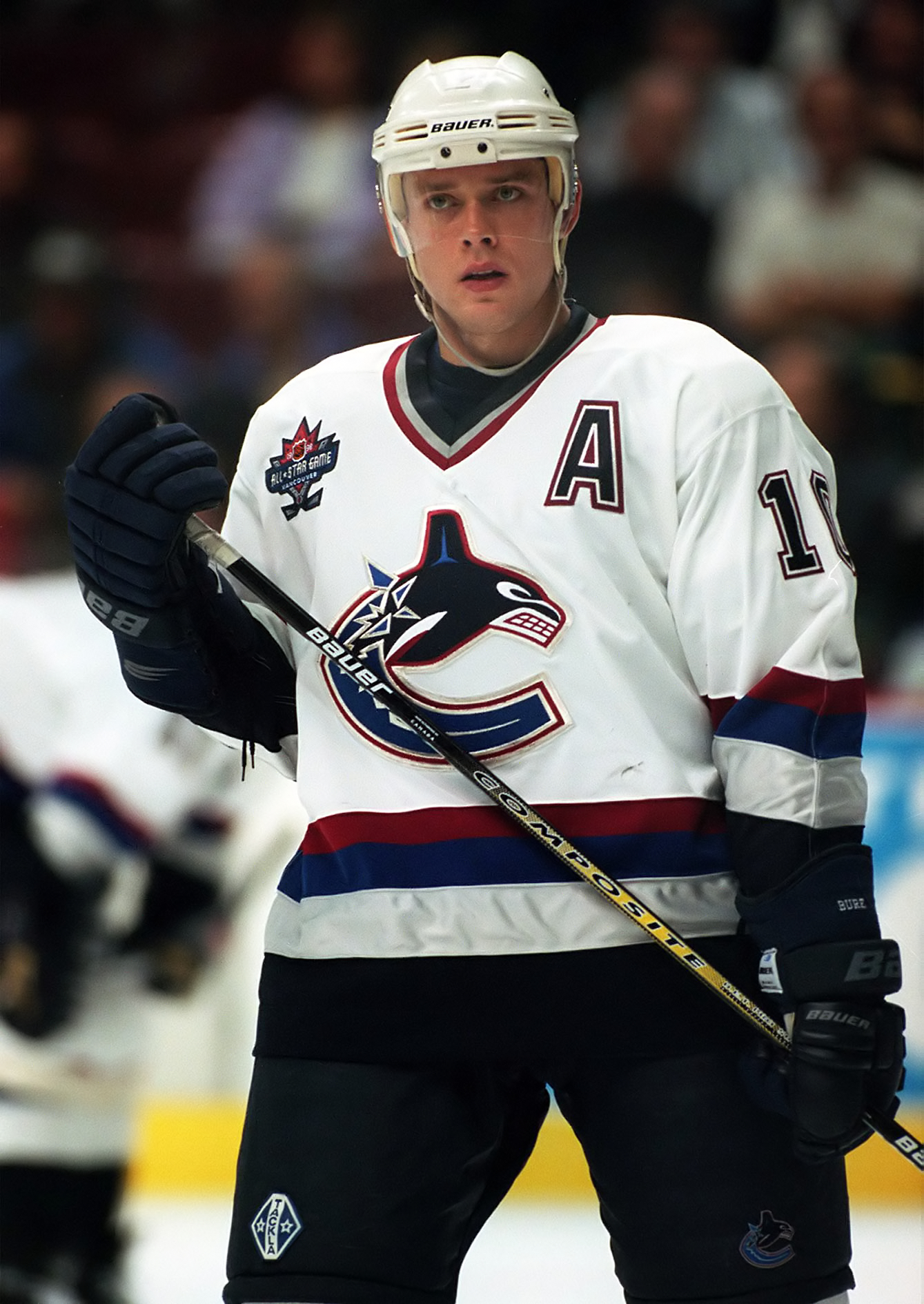
- Bure with the Vancouver Canucks in 1997
- Born: 31 March 1971 (age 55) Moscow, Russian SFSR, Soviet Union
- Height: 5 ft 10 in (178 cm)
- Weight: 191 lb (87 kg; 13 st 9 lb)
- Position: Right wing
- Shot: Left
- Played for: CSKA Moscow; Vancouver Canucks; Spartak Moscow; EV Landshut; Florida Panthers; New York Rangers
- National team: Soviet Union and Russia
- NHL draft: 113th overall, 1989; Vancouver Canucks
- Playing career: 1987–2003
Medal record
Men's Ice hockey
Representing Soviet Union
World Championships
Gold medal – first place	1990 Switzerland
Bronze medal – third place	1991 Finland
World Junior Championships
Gold medal – first place	1989 United States
Silver medal – second place	1990 Finland
Silver medal – second place	1991 Canada
European Junior Championships
Gold medal – first place	1989 USSR
Bronze medal – third place	1988 Czechoslovakia
Quebec Esso Cup
Gold medal – first place	1988 Canada
Goodwill Games
Gold medal – first place	1990 USA
Representing Russia
Olympic Games
Silver medal – second place	1998 Nagano
Bronze medal – third place	2002 Salt Lake City

Pavel Vladimirovich Bure (Russian: Па́вел Влади́мирович Буре́, IPA: [ˈpavʲɪl bʊˈrɛ]; born 31 March 1971) is a Russian former professional ice hockey player who played the right wing position. Nicknamed "the Russian Rocket" for his exceptional speed and skill, Bure played for 12 seasons in the National Hockey League (NHL) with the Vancouver Canucks, Florida Panthers and New York Rangers between 1991 and 2003. Trained in the Soviet Union, he played three seasons with the Central Red Army team before his NHL career.

Selected 113th overall in the 1989 NHL entry draft by Vancouver, he began his NHL career in the 1991–92 season, and won the Calder Memorial Trophy as the league's best rookie before leading the NHL in goal-scoring in 1993–94 and helping the Canucks to the 1994 Stanley Cup Final. After seven seasons the Canucks traded Bure to the Panthers, where he won back-to-back Rocket Richard Trophies as the league's leading goal-scorer. Bure struggled with knee injuries throughout his career, resulting in his retirement in 2005 as a member of the Rangers, although he had not played since 2003. He averaged better than a point per game in his NHL career (779 points with 437 goals in 702 NHL games) and is fourth all-time in goals per game. (Note: Among players who have played at least 500 games in the modern-era (Original Six era and onward). Cy Denneny and Babe Dye played in the 1920s.) After six years of eligibility, Bure was elected into the Hockey Hall of Fame in June 2012. In 2017, an NHL panel named Bure one of the 100 Greatest NHL Players in history.

Internationally, Bure competed for the Soviet Union and Russia. As a member of the Soviet Union, he won two silver medals and a gold in three World Junior Championships, followed by a gold and a silver medal in the 1990 and 1991 World Championships, respectively. After the Soviet Union was dissolved in 1991, Bure competed for Russia in two Olympic Games, claiming silver at the 1998 Games in Nagano as team captain, and bronze at the 2002 Games in Salt Lake City. Following Bure's retirement in 2005, he was named the general manager for Russia's national team at the 2006 Winter Olympics in Turin. Bure was later recognized by the International Ice Hockey Federation (IIHF) for his international career, and was inducted into the IIHF Hall of Fame in 2012.

== Early life ==
Bure was born in Moscow in 1971 to Vladimir and Tatiana Bure. Vladimir Bure, a Russian swimming legend, had dreams of Pavel becoming a professional swimmer, but he aspired to play hockey at an early age. He attended his first tryout with the CSKA Moscow hockey school at the age of six, despite his limited skating ability. Until that point, Bure had only played ball hockey on the streets. After Bure failed to impress in his first tryout, his father told him that if he did not show significant improvement within two months, he would withdraw him from the hockey school. By age 11, he was named the best forward in his league. Around that time, in July 1982, Bure was selected as one of three young Russian players to practice with Wayne Gretzky and Soviet national goaltender Vladislav Tretiak in a taped television special.

At age 12, his parents separated, and he remained with his mother. By the time he was 14 years old, he was named to the Central Red Army's junior team. In 1991, he joined his father and brother, Valeri in moving to North America as he embarked on a National Hockey League (NHL) career with the Vancouver Canucks. His mother arrived two months later. They settled initially in Los Angeles where Vladimir continued to train and coach both Valeri and Pavel in hockey and physical conditioning. However both became estranged from their father, along with his second wife and their half-sister Katya, by 1998. Neither brother has explained a reason for the split.

In December 1986, he embarked on a tour of Canada with the Soviet national midget team from Ottawa to Vancouver. Nearly five years before Bure made his NHL debut with the Vancouver Canucks in 1991 at the Pacific Coliseum, he played his first game at his future home rink as part of the tour. Bure also earned another opportunity to meet Gretzky, as well as defenceman Paul Coffey, when his team stopped in Edmonton to play at the Northlands Coliseum.

== Playing career ==
=== CSKA Moscow (1987–1991) ===
At age 16, Bure began his professional hockey career playing for CSKA Moscow. He was invited to the senior club's training camp for the 1987–88 season. Although he was deemed too young and not yet ready for the Soviet League, Bure earned minimal playing time filling in for absent regulars. He made his debut in September 1987, and played five games for the senior team, scoring his only goal in his first game.

Bure joined the club full-time in 1988–89 and amassed 17 goals, a Soviet League record for rookies. The record would last for 18 years until Alexei Cherepanov scored 18 goals in 2006–07. Bure added 9 assists for 26 points to earn the league's rookie of the year honours. His individual success helped CSKA Moscow capture their thirteenth consecutive Soviet championship and twelfth consecutive IIHF European Cup in 1989 (they repeated as European champions the following year).

As a member CSKA, Bure joined a lineup that featured several future NHL players, including linemates Sergei Fedorov and Alexander Mogilny, as well as Igor Larionov, Viacheslav Fetisov, Sergei Makarov, and Vladimir Konstantinov. The combination of Bure, Fedorov and Mogilny formed a promising combination for head coach Viktor Tikhonov, with expectations to replace the previous top Soviet line, the K-L-M combination of Vladimir Krutov, Larionov and Makarov. The trio was short-lived, as Mogilny defected to play for the Buffalo Sabres in 1989, and Fedorov joined the Detroit Red Wings the following year.

In his third and final season with the Red Army, Bure tied for the lead in team-scoring with Valeri Kamensky, tallying 46 points. His 35 goals was second in the league, one goal behind Ramil Yuldashev of Sokil Kyiv. Bure turned down a three-year contract extension in August 1991, which resulted in him being left off the roster of the Soviet team for the Canada Cup.

=== Transfer to the NHL (1989–1991) ===
Prior to the 1989 NHL entry draft, William Houston of The Globe and Mail wrote, "The best of the group is Soviet star winger Pavel Bure, a spectacular player with outstanding speed. He is compared to Vladimir Krutov and also the late Soviet superstar of the 1970s, Valeri Kharlamov." NHL organizations were afraid he would not leave the Soviet Union to play in the NHL thus deterring teams from selecting him early, although scouts and analysts believed he could have been selected as high as the second round had he defected. Many analysts compared him to Valeri Kharlamov. Edmonton Oilers' scout Barry Fraser commented, "From what I've seen of him, Bure can play on any team in the NHL right now... he's quick, real quick, small and very exciting. He may be the top player in this year's draft, but because he is from the Soviet Union, we don't analyze him the same way as a kid from the West... I don't expect him to go really early because it is still too much of a gamble to hope he will defect."

Bure was selected 113th overall in the sixth round Draft by the Vancouver Canucks, following his rookie season with CSKA Moscow. The pick was controversial, as the Canucks had chosen him seemingly a year ahead of his eligible draft season. At the age of 18, he was available to be chosen in the first three rounds of the draft, but to be selected any later, he would have needed to play at least two seasons—with a minimum of 11 games per season—for his elite-level Soviet club, the Central Red Army. While most teams believed he was ineligible, the Canucks' head scout at the time, Mike Penny, discovered Bure had played in additional exhibition and international games to make him an eligible late-round draft choice a year early. Jack Button, the Washington Capitals' director of player personnel, admitted "everybody would have taken him earlier. We assumed he was not eligible... you've got to give the Canucks credit for doing their homework."

Several other teams either had similar knowledge or had pursued Bure but there was confusion as to the legitimacy of the extra games. The Detroit Red Wings had asked league vice president Gil Stein about Bure's availability before their fifth-round pick but were told he was not eligible. They later decided to select him with their sixth-round pick, 116th overall, and settle his eligibility later. The Canucks selected Bure three picks ahead of Detroit's turn. Meanwhile, Winnipeg Jets general manager Mike Smith, claimed he made an offer to the Soviet Ice Hockey Federation that would involve three years of transfer payments before Bure would be allowed to join the Jets; however Smith did not have any plans to draft Bure in 1989 as he believed he was ineligible.

Canucks' general manager Pat Quinn originally intended to draft Bure in the eighth round but after receiving word the Oilers had similar intentions selected him in the sixth. Following the announcement of Bure's draft, several other team representatives reportedly stormed the Met Center stage in Minnesota, where the draft was being held. Formal complaints were filed resulting in an investigation into the selection. After the pick was deemed illegal by league president John Ziegler in a press release on May 17, 1990, the Canucks appealed the decision, procuring game sheets proving Bure's participation in the additional games with the help of recent Soviet acquisition Igor Larionov. It was not until the eve of the 1990 NHL entry draft, in which Bure would have been re-entered that the draft choice was upheld. Although Larionov and Fetisov had successfully spearheaded the rebellion against Soviet ice hockey officials in the late 1980s that led to Soviet players joining the NHL, Bure's transfer to the Canucks was met with resistance, and the Soviet authorities forbade the Canucks to contact Bure personally. During the 1991 World Junior Championships, he said in an interview that he was hesitant to defect for fears the Soviets would make things difficult for his younger brother Valeri Bure, who was 15 at the time and playing in the junior league.

Bure left Moscow with his father and brother on September 6, 1991, staying temporarily in Los Angeles. His mother arrived shortly afterward. The Canucks began negotiating a contract with Bure, but before one could be finalized, the issue of his existing contract with the Central Red Army had to be settled. The Canucks management and officials from the Soviet Ice Hockey Federation met in late-October 1991 in a Detroit court, where they bartered for a cash settlement. After the Canucks offered US$200,000, Bure stood up in the courtroom to offer an additional $50,000, bringing the total to $250,000. The Soviet officials accepted, and Canucks management paid the full $250,000. Bure signed a four-year contract worth a reported $2.7 million with an $800,000 signing bonus. The deal made Bure the Canucks' second highest paid player behind team captain Trevor Linden.

=== Vancouver Canucks (1991–1999) ===
Due to the court proceedings, Bure's debut with the Canucks was delayed until a month into the 1991–92 season. Garnering much attention in Vancouver, his first practice with the club on November 3, 1991, was attended by approximately 2,000 fans. He played his first game for the Canucks on November 5, 1991, in a 2–2 tie against the Winnipeg Jets. Despite not scoring a point, Bure showcased his talent and speed with several end-to-end rushes, carrying the puck past several defenders from near his defensive zone to the opposing net. Following the game, Vancouver Sun columnist Iain MacIntyre compared him to a rocket, calling him "the fastest Soviet creation since Sputnik". MacIntyre's comments are credited for laying the groundwork for Bure's moniker as the "Russian Rocket," which echoed the nickname of Maurice "Rocket" Richard, who played for the Montreal Canadiens in the 1950s. In his third game, Bure recorded his first point, an assist against the New York Islanders on November 10. He scored his first two NHL goals in the next game, on November 12, against Daniel Berthiaume of the Los Angeles Kings. He finished with 34 goals and 60 points in 65 games that season, including 22 goals in his final 23 games. In the last game of the regular season, Bure scored a goal to tie Ivan Hlinka's 1981–82 team mark for most points by a rookie.

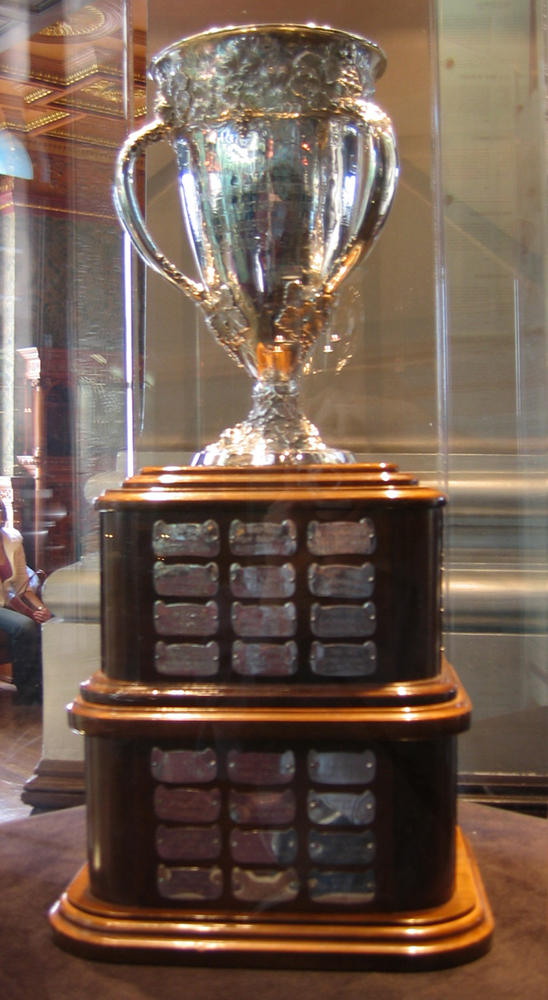
The Calder Memorial Trophy that Bure won in his rookie season

As the Canucks opened the 1992 playoffs against the Winnipeg Jets, Bure recorded his first NHL hat trick in game six to help force a seventh and deciding game. Vancouver won the series to advance to the second round, but were eliminated by the Edmonton Oilers. Bure finished his first Stanley Cup playoffs with six goals and 10 points in 13 games. At the end of the season, he was awarded the Calder Memorial Trophy as rookie of the year. His 60 points were second among first-year players to Tony Amonte's 69 points with the Rangers, although Bure played in 14 fewer games. When accepting the award, Bure thanked Canucks linemate Igor Larionov for his guidance. On arriving in Vancouver, his former Red Army teammate took him into his home for two weeks before Bure moved into his own apartment; the two also roomed together on the road. Bure's Calder Trophy, along with head coach Pat Quinn's Jack Adams Award as the league's top coach, marked the first major individual NHL awards in Canucks' team history. However, despite being named the league's top rookie, Bure was left off the NHL All-Rookie Team, making him the only Calder recipient not to be named to the lineup. This was because he split his time playing both left and right wing. When it came to voting for the players, Bure had the most total votes, but not enough at either position to claim a spot.

Bure improved on his rookie season in 1992–93 with the first of two consecutive 60-goal seasons. In the third game of the season, he scored a career-high four goals against the Winnipeg Jets. His three goals and one assist in the second period set a pair of Canucks' records for most goals and points in a period, in addition to the team mark for most goals overall in a game (for which he is tied with several players). Furthermore, Bure scored two of his goals on the penalty kill to set a fourth team record for most short-handed goals in one contest. He appeared in his first NHL All-Star Game in 1993, being named to the Clarence Campbell Conference Team as the lone Canucks' representative, and scored two goals. Shortly after the All-Star break, Bure established a new franchise record for goals in a season during a 5–1 win over the Quebec Nordiques, surpassing Tony Tanti's 45-goal mark. The next month, on March 1, he reached the 50-goal mark for the first time in his career, scoring against Grant Fuhr of the Buffalo Sabres in a neutral-site game in Hamilton, Ontario. He also surpassed Patrik Sundström's franchise record of 91 points. Bure finished the season with 110 points in 83 games, and became the first Canuck named to the NHL first All-Star team. His 110 points stood as the team record until it was broken by Henrik Sedin's 112 points in 2009–10.

A groin injury early in the 1993-94 season limited Bure's production for the first half of the season. Even so, he improved in the second half, and led the league in goal-scoring by repeating his 60-goal feat of the previous season. In doing so, he became the eighth player in NHL history to record back-to-back 60-goal seasons. He concluded the season with a streak of 49 goals and 78 points in his final 51 games, and earned player of the month honours in March 1994 after scoring 19 goals and 30 points in 16 games. His March scoring burst was just one point shy of Stan Smyl's 31-point March in 1983 for the most productive month by a Canucks player. Bure's 154 NHL goals at that point in his career put him behind only Wayne Gretzky and Mike Bossy for the most in any NHL player's first three seasons. He recorded 49 goals in the club's final 51 games, and contributed to 46.45% of his team's goals in the final 47 games of the season to carry the Canucks into the 1994 postseason.

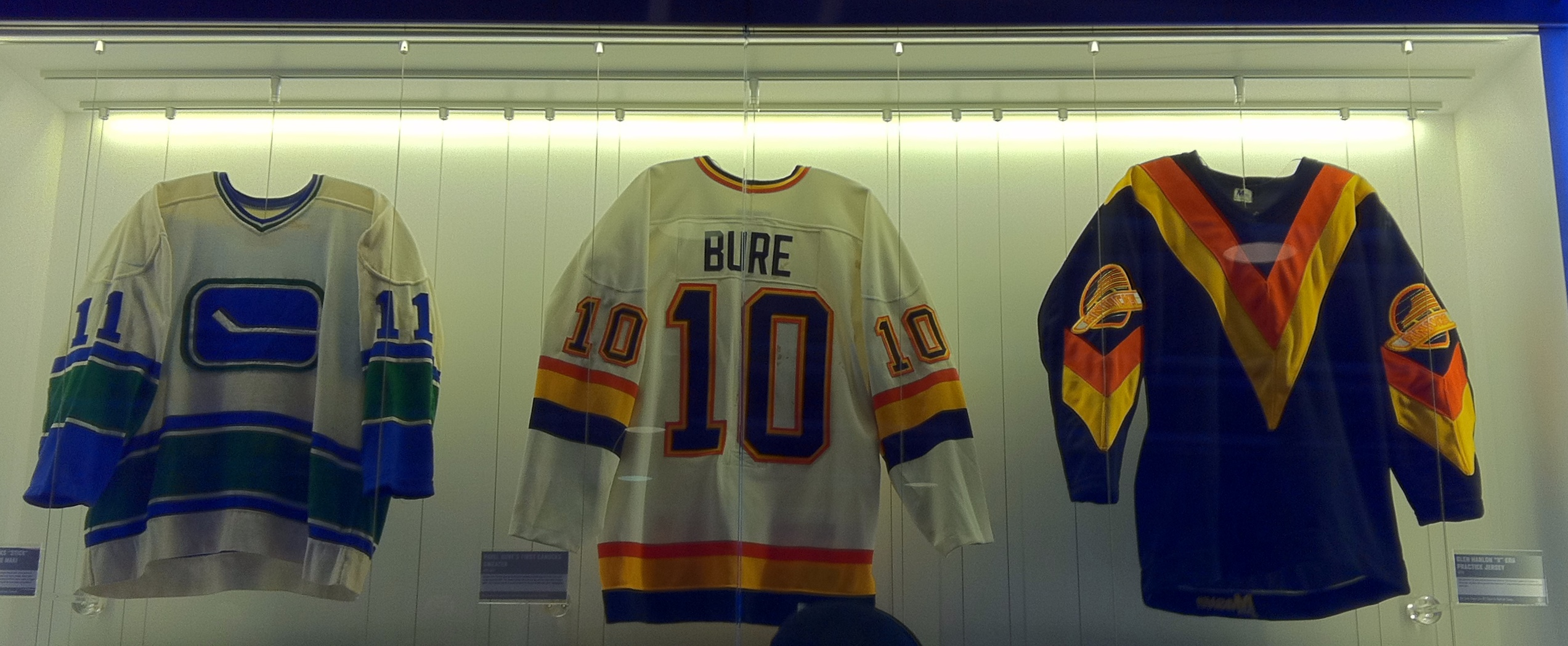
Bure's first game-worn Canucks jersey (centre) on display at Rogers Arena (also pictured on either side are Wayne Maki and Glen Hanlon's jerseys).

Entering the 1994 Stanley Cup Playoffs as the seventh seed, the Canucks went on a run to the Stanley Cup Final. In the seventh game of the opening-round series against the Calgary Flames, Bure scored one of the most significant and well-known goals in Canucks' history. After receiving a breakaway pass from defenceman Jeff Brown, he deked and scored on Flames' goalie Mike Vernon in the second overtime to win the series. In game two of the second round against the Dallas Stars, Bure knocked enforcer Shane Churla to the ice with an elbow to the jaw. He also scored two goals in the game to help Vancouver to a 3–0 win. Although Bure was not initially penalized for the play, he was later fined $500 by the league. He recorded six goals and eight points in five games against the Dallas Stars, and against the Toronto Maple Leafs the following round scored four goals and six points in five games.

After defeating Dallas in five games, the Canucks eliminated the Toronto Maple Leafs in the Campbell Conference Finals to meet the New York Rangers in the Finals, where the Canucks lost in seven games. Bure finished with a team-high 16 goals and 31 points in 24 games, second in playoff scoring only to Conn Smythe Trophy winner Brian Leetch. His points total also remained the highest by any Russian player until Evgeni Malkin of the Pittsburgh Penguins recorded 36 in 2009.

In the next off-season, the Canucks announced they had re-signed Bure to a five-year, $24.5 million contract on June 16. The deal was reported to have been signed before game three of the Stanley Cup Final against New York. It also included Bure's marketing rights and put his father, Vladimir, on the team payroll as a fitness and marketing consultant. The average annual salary of $4.9 million made Bure the league's third highest-paid player, behind Wayne Gretzky and Mario Lemieux. In fact, Bure and the Canucks had entered into contract negotiations at the beginning of the 1993–94 season, although two years remained in his original deal. Neither side could come to an initial agreement; one of the major factors was the Canucks' demands for the contract to be in Canadian dollars on account of the American exchange rate. Numerous accusations were made in the media during the Canucks' playoff run that Bure threatened not to play if a contract could not be agreed upon. A Toronto Star article, published before the first game of the Finals on May 31, 1994, claimed Bure had signed a five-year, $30 million contract that, if the Canucks had not agreed to, would have seen him pull out of game five of the Conference Finals against the Maple Leafs. The article was followed by two additional claims in the following two days in the Vancouver-based newspaper The Province and Toronto Sun. The Toronto Sun held the contract was a five-year, $22.5 million deal, and that it was signed before either game six or seven of the opening round against the Flames after Bure's agent, Ron Salcer, told general manager Quinn that Bure would not play if the deal was not made. As the story continued well into the next season, Pat Quinn appeared in a segment on the Canadian Broadcasting Corporation (CBC)'s Hockey Night in Canada on March 27, 1995, publicly denying the claims.

Due to the 1994–95 NHL lockout, Bure spent single-game stints with Spartak Moscow of the Russian Super League and EV Landshut of the Deutsche Eishockey Liga (DEL). He joined a team of Russian NHL players organized by Slava Fetisov that returned to Russia to play a five-game charity tour against local clubs. On the team, Bure reunited with former Central Red Army linemates Mogilny and Fedorov. When the NHL Players' Association (NHLPA) and owners came to an agreement on January 12, 1995, NHL play was set to resume. However, there were unresolved contract issues, as Salcer claimed the Canucks promised they would pay Bure's full salary, despite the lockout, which cancelled nearly half of the 1994–95 season. Bure held out for four days as a result (the amount claimed to be owing was $1.7 million), before the two sides reached an agreement. The Canucks would put the disputed amount in escrow and would continue discussions. He soon reported to Vancouver and went on to tally 43 points in 44 games of the shortened season. In the 1995 playoffs, Bure set franchise records for most goals and points in a series with seven and 12 respectively in a seven-game series victory against the St. Louis Blues (Mikael Samuelsson tied Bure's goal-scoring record in 2010 against the Los Angeles Kings). The Canucks, however, failed to defend their Clarence Campbell Conference championship title, being swept by the Chicago Blackhawks in the second round. The Canucks' elimination in 1995 marked the last time Bure appeared in the post-season with the club. He finished with a career playoff total of 66 points with the Canucks, including 34 goals, which remained the highest club total until Linden tied the mark in 2007.

At the start of the 1995–96 season, Bure changed his jersey number from 10 to 96. The switch commemorated September 6, 1991, the day on which he first landed in North America from Moscow—9th month, 6th day. He had originally asked to wear the number when he first joined the Canucks, but was not permitted to do so by head coach Pat Quinn, who did not approve of high jersey numbers. After the Canucks traded with the Buffalo Sabres for Alexander Mogilny, reuniting the two Russian players, the jersey number was deemed acceptable because Mogilny had used number 89 since defecting to North America in 1989.

Early in the season, Bure sustained the first of several serious knee injuries during his career. On November 9, 1995, in a game against the Chicago Blackhawks, Bure was grabbed around the head by defenceman Steve Smith while approaching the end boards. Falling to the ice, he caught his skate against the boards, tearing the anterior cruciate ligament (ACL) in his right knee. Requiring arthroscopic surgery, in which tendon was removed from his hamstring to repair the ACL, he was sidelined for the remainder of the season.

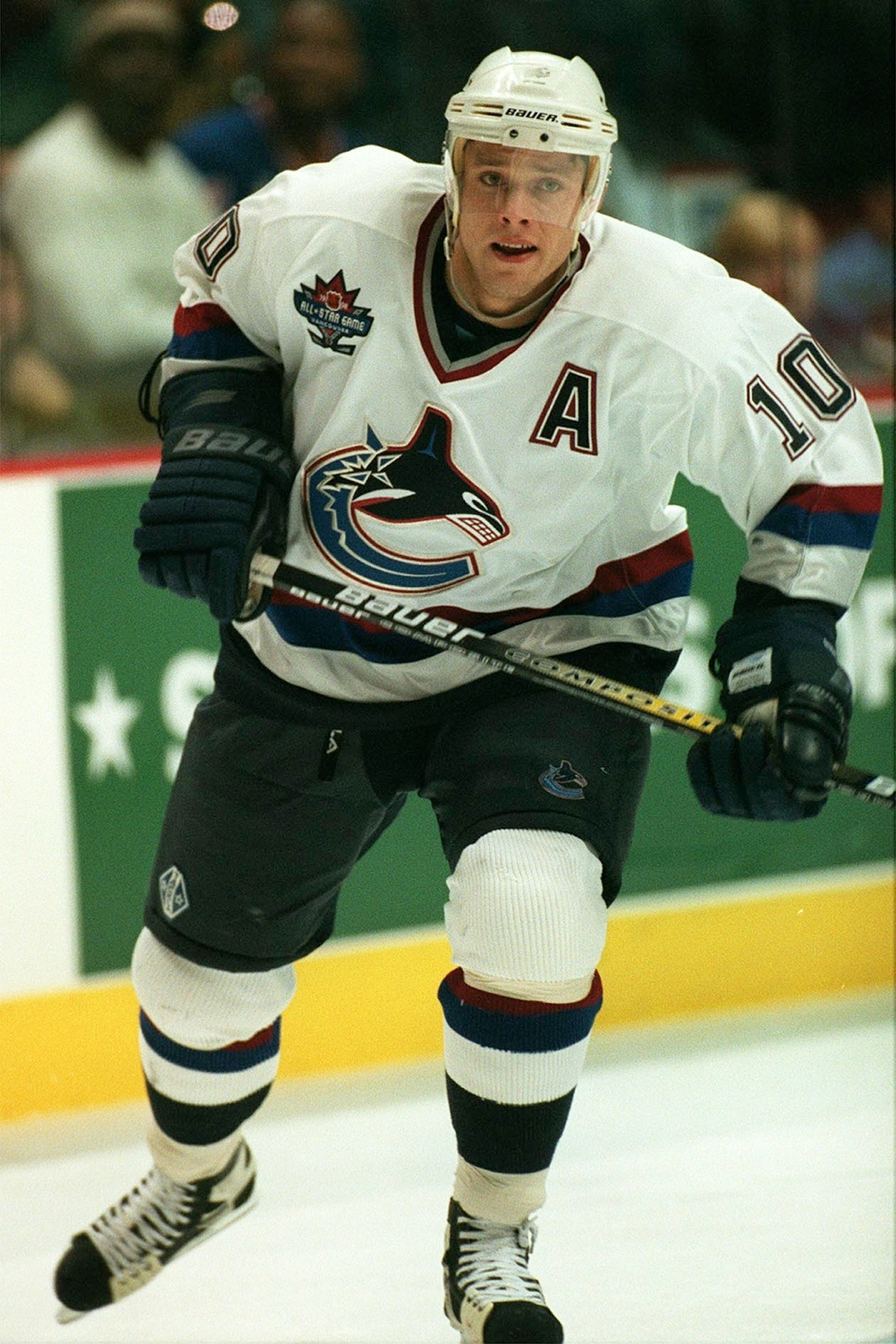
Pavel Bure in 1997 donning an alternate captain's crest for the Vancouver Canucks. He served as an alternate captain with the team between 1995 and 1998.

Bure returned to the Canucks' lineup with his knee fully recovered in the 1996–97 season. In the season opener against the Flames on October 5, 1996, Bure was pushed into the boards head-first. He continued to play after the hit, but experienced headaches in the following weeks. As Bure's play dropped early in the season, the media speculated that he was playing injured. After he went eight games without a goal, head coach Tom Renney claimed Bure was not playing with a head injury, but instead had injured his shoulder in a game against the New York Rangers on November 23. Nevertheless, he continued to play. With under a month left in the season, he received another hit, during a game against the Avalanche on March 3, 1997. Bure left the game and did not return for the remainder of the season. Afterwards, he admitted he was playing with a neck injury, having sustained whiplash from the first game against Calgary, but did not want to take himself out of the lineup after missing 62 games the previous season. With Bure's reduced playing capacity, he managed 55 points in 63 games, well below his usual pace, and the Canucks missed the playoffs for the first time since he joined the team. In a 2012 interview, Bure admitted having sustained a head injury on the initial hit against Calgary and that "he should not have played through it".

In the off-season, the Canucks made another significant move, signing Rangers' captain Mark Messier during free agency on July 26, 1997. Despite finally having a high-profile centre to play with, media reports soon appeared claiming that Bure was asking to be traded. The Canucks opened the season with two games against the Mighty Ducks of Anaheim in Tokyo – an event organized by the league to market hockey for the upcoming 1998 Winter Olympics in Nagano, Japan. After two injury-plagued seasons with the number 96 on his jersey, Bure switched back to his familiar number 10, explaining: "I'm not superstitious, but the last two seasons have been bad memories." Although the Canucks missed the playoffs for the second straight year, he returned to his previous form in 1997–98, scoring 51 goals for his first 50-goal season since 1993–94, and third overall. Bure later recalled that with the Canucks out of playoff contention with a handful of games left, head coach Mike Keenan told him he could play as much as he wanted to reach the milestone. Scoring 50 goals was also implicit in a contract bonus for Bure. With an additional 39 assists, his 90 points ranked him third in the NHL, behind Peter Forsberg and Jaromír Jágr.

Following the 1997–98 season, Bure told newly appointed general manager Brian Burke that he would not play for the Canucks again, despite still having a year left in his contract worth $8 million. He then went public with the declaration, stating he intended to leave the club for "personal reasons". Bure did not report to the club the following season. Instead, he returned to his hometown Moscow to practise with his former Central Red Army club. During this time, Belarusian President Alexander Lukashenko offered Bure a tax-free $4 million salary to play in Belarus, which he turned down.

=== Florida Panthers (1999–2002) ===
Bure held out well into the 1998–99 season until he was traded on January 17, 1999, to the Florida Panthers, with Bret Hedican, Brad Ference, and Vancouver's third-round choice in the 2000 NHL entry draft (Robert Fried) for Ed Jovanovski, Dave Gagner, Mike Brown, Kevin Weekes, and Florida's first-round choice in the 2000 draft (Nathan Smith). Talks between Burke and Bryan Murray, general manager of the Panthers, had begun in late-December. After the trade was completed, Bure explained that he felt alienated from Canucks' management after arriving in North America having defected from Russia. He claimed he had been in Los Angeles for two weeks before any Canucks' representative came to see him, as well as several bitter contract negotiations—particularly those of 1994. He also claimed that someone within the Canucks' management planted the constant allegations that he threatened not to play during the 1994 playoff run. Bure's agent at the time, Ron Salcer, also believed the story.

Meeting the Panthers in New York for a game against the Islanders, Bure debuted with his new club on January 20, 1999. He played on an all-Russian line with Viktor Kozlov and Oleg Kvasha and scored two goals. In his first six games with the club, Bure scored eight goals and three assists for eleven points. Less than a month into his Panthers debut, he reinjured his knee, keeping him out for three weeks. Despite the injury, the Panthers signed him to a five-year, $47.5 million contract (with an option for a sixth year at $10.5 million), the most lucrative in team history. Another injury ended Bure's season after just 11 games with Florida, though he scored 13 goals and three assists in that time.

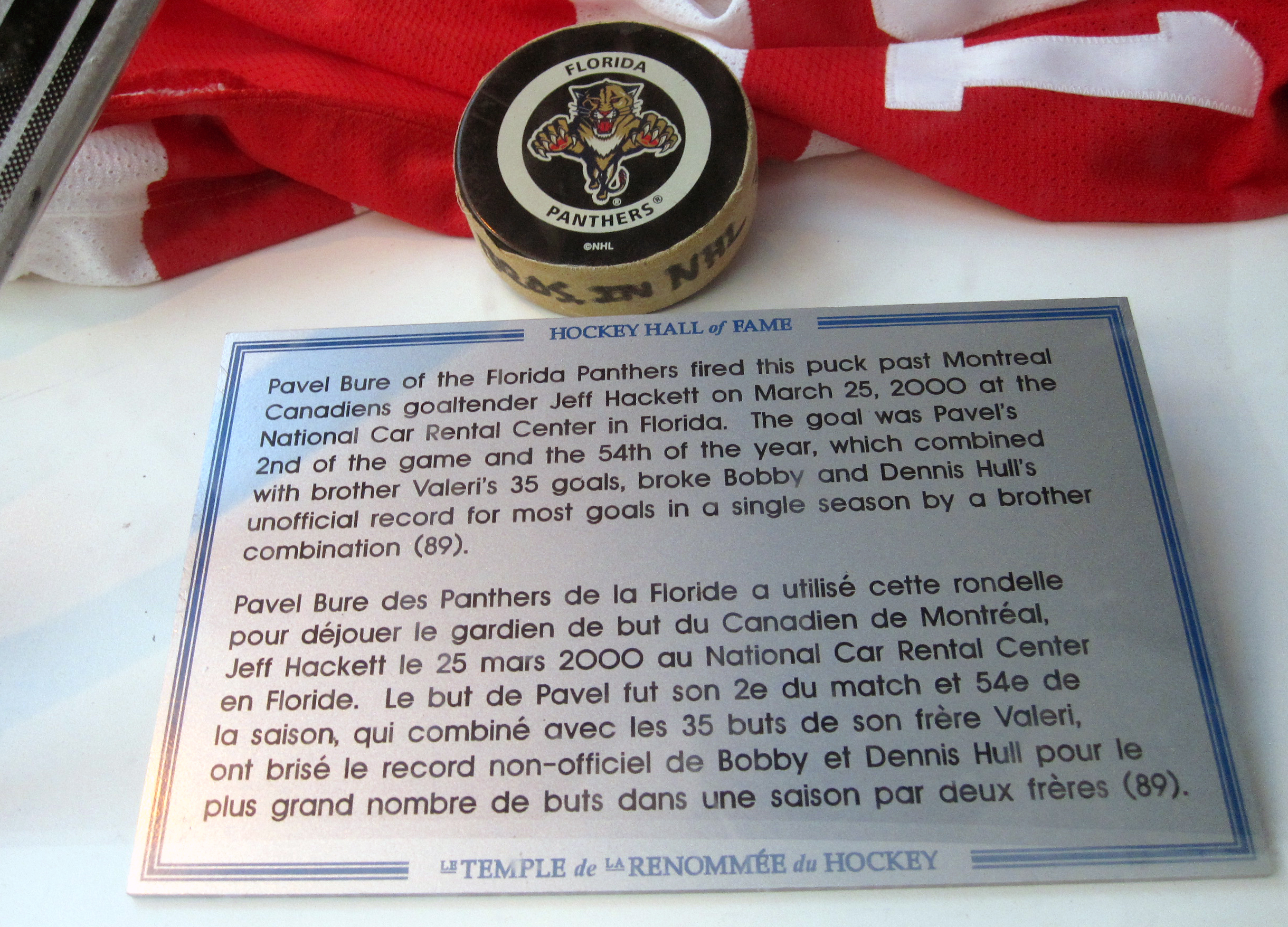
The puck commemorating Bure's 54th goal of the 1999–2000 season, which combined with Valeri Bure's 35 goals to break Bobby and Dennis Hull's mark of 89 goals by a brother combination in a single season.

In 1999–2000, his first full season as a Panther, Bure led the league in goal-scoring to capture his first of two consecutive Rocket Richard Trophies with a 58-goal season. It marked the second time Bure led the league in goal-scoring, but his first Rocket Richard Trophy as the award had been introduced the previous season. Combined with 36 assists, his 94 points came within two of Art Ross Trophy winner Jaromír Jágr as the league's leading point-scorer. His 58 goals and 94 points both set franchise records. He helped Florida to a fifth-place finish in the Eastern Conference to earn their first post-season berth in three seasons, though they were swept by the eventual Stanley Cup champions, the New Jersey Devils. Bure finished third for the Hart Memorial Trophy winner behind Chris Pronger and Jágr. He was named to the NHL second All-Star team for the first time.

Bure was set to make his much-anticipated return to Vancouver to play the Canucks on November 5, 1999, but was kept out of the lineup due to a broken finger. A prior groin injury had also forced him out of a Panther's home game against the Canucks earlier in the season. During the season, he was named to the 2000 NHL All-Star Game in Toronto, where he recorded an assist and the eleventh hat trick in the history of the All-Star Game. Of Bure's three goals, two were assisted by his brother Valeri, who played on the same line with him, along with his Panthers linemate, Viktor Kozlov. Helping lead the World team to a 9–4 victory over North America, Bure was named the All-Star Game MVP.

Bure repeated as league scoring champion in 2000–01 with 59 goals, reaching the 50-goal plateau for the fifth and final time in his career, as well as bettering his franchise single-season, goal-scoring record. However, the Panthers missed the playoffs, finishing 12th place in the East. Bure set a league record that season by scoring 29.5% of his team's total goals over the course of the season. He was named to the NHL second All-Star team, behind Jágr in the right wing position for the second consecutive year.

Before the 2001–02 season, the Panthers acquired Valeri Bure from the Calgary Flames in a trade, putting the brothers on the same team for the first time. However, Bure suffered a setback in the pre-season re-injuring his groin. Bure recalled having "good relations" with Panthers' management, who often consulted with him on team matters, including the acquisition of his brother. At the trading deadline, Bure was traded to the New York Rangers. During his 56 games for the Panthers that season, he led the team in scoring for the third consecutive season with 49 points.

=== New York Rangers (2002–2003) ===
The New York Rangers acquired Bure on March 18, 2002, along with Florida's second-round pick in the 2002 draft (Lee Falardeau) for Igor Ulanov, Filip Novak, as well as the Rangers' first and second-round choices in the 2002 draft (Petr Tatíček and Rob Globke, respectively) and a fourth-round choice in the 2003 draft. The Rangers had shown interest in Bure when he requested a trade from the Canucks in 1997. After losing their initial bid for Bure, Wayne Gretzky, who retired the same season Bure was traded to Florida, announced prior to the 1999–2000 season he would have extended his career had the Rangers been able to pull off the trade. Bure made his Rangers debut against the Vancouver Canucks the day after his trade on March 19, scoring a goal against his former team. He scored 12 goals and 20 points in 12 games after being traded, bettering his pace with Florida that season. Between the two teams, he finished the season with 34 goals and 69 points.

Bure suffered another knee injury in the 2002–03 pre-season; combined with a case of strep throat, he missed the first three games of the regular season. After returning to play, he had 14 goals and 21 points in his first 27 games, including two goals and an assist in his first game back, before a knee-on-knee collision in December forced him back out. After undergoing surgery 10 days later, it was revealed that there was no damage to the ACL as previously feared, but instead a tear to the meniscus in his left knee, which was repaired. Bure returned that season to appear in 39 games, managing 19 goals and 30 points.

Even after two operations, Bure did not play in 2003–04 due to the lingering effects of the knee injury. He failed a pre-season physical and was declared medically unable to play. Left with his fully insured $10 million salary (80 percent of which would be reimbursed to the team), the Rangers left him unprotected in the NHL's Waiver Draft, where he was unclaimed.

=== Retirement ===
Bure remained inactive for another season due to the 2004–05 NHL lockout. After the NHL resumed play for the 2005–06 season, he announced his retirement from professional hockey at a press conference in Moscow on November 1, 2005, citing complications with his chronic knee injuries. In an interview Bure explained that he did not want to extend his playing career without being able to play at an elite level.

Because Bure had been inactive since the 2002–03 season, he was eligible for selection into the Hockey Hall of Fame (which requires players to wait three years after their last game) immediately following his retirement. After being passed for induction in his first six years of eligibility, Bure was voted in on June 27, 2012, alongside Joe Sakic, Adam Oates and Mats Sundin. He became the fifth Soviet or Russian player (after Vladislav Tretiak, Viacheslav Fetisov, Valeri Kharlamov and Igor Larionov) and the first player to spend the majority of his career with the Canucks to be inducted into the Hall of Fame. (Note: Cam Neely, Mark Messier and Igor Larionov had been previously inducted, but none played with the Canucks for more than three seasons. Mats Sundin was also voted in on the same day, but had only played half a season with Vancouver.)

His non-selection in previous years was widely debated in the media. Bure was often compared with Cam Neely, a player who also waited six years for induction; he recorded similar goals-per-game numbers in a career that was also shortened to 700-plus games. It had been often rumoured that Pat Quinn, Bure's former head coach and general manager in Vancouver, who became co-chairman of the Hockey Hall of Fame's selection committee, opposed Bure's induction. However, in a conference call following his selection, Quinn was among the most prominent figures he thanked. Quinn criticized the Canucks organization for not yet retiring Bure's jersey.

In his retirement, he remained publicly steadfast in his dissatisfaction with the way he was treated by the Canucks organization during his playing career. While Bure admitted to "a lot of disagreements with the Canucks management," he maintained that he "never had any problems with the Canucks fans". The Canucks retired Bure's 10 jersey on November 2, 2013. The day before the Canucks announced they would rename the team's Most Exciting Player Award to the Pavel Bure Most Exciting Player Award in his honour. Bure renounced his US citizenship in 2016.

== International career ==
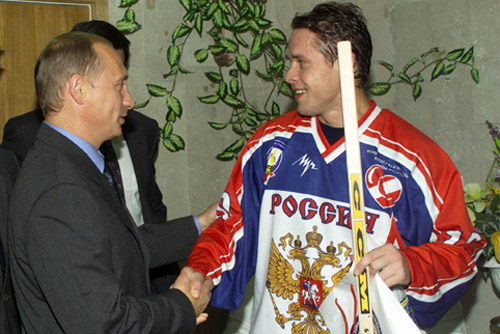
Bure with Russian President Vladimir Putin at a Spartak Cup match between Russia and the Czech Republic on August 14, 2001

=== Junior ===
Prior to joining the NHL in 1991, Bure competed for the Soviet Union in several junior, international tournaments. The first was the 1988 Quebec Esso Cup, an under-17 tournament (now known as the World U-17 Hockey Challenge) held in Quebec City, where he earned a gold medal. That same year, he competed in his first of two consecutive European Junior Championships, winning a bronze medal.

The following year, Bure debuted at the world under-20 level as a 17-year-old at the 1989 World Junior Championships in Anchorage, Alaska. The top line of CSKA Moscow teammates Bure, Alexander Mogilny and Sergei Fedorov led the Soviet Union to a gold medal. Bure's eight goals tied him for the tournament lead with Jeremy Roenick of the United States; he led the Soviet team with 14 points. He was named to the Tournament All-Star team, and earned Best Forward honours. He again participated in the 1989 European Junior Championship, helping the Soviet Union win the gold medal.

Bure competed in his second World Juniors in 1990, winning a silver medal in Helsinki, Finland, and scoring seven goals in seven games. Later that year, he made his senior debut with the Soviet national team as a 19-year-old at the 1990 World Championships in Switzerland. He scored two goals and four assists in ten games to help the Soviets to a gold medal finish. The Soviet team also won silver in the European Championship, which was decided from games played among the European teams at the tournament. Several months later, in July, Bure took part in his third international tournament of the year at the 1990 Goodwill Games in Seattle. Bure scored four goals and an assist in five games, and the Soviets won the gold medal.

In 1991, Bure appeared in his third and final World Junior Championships. Bure finished the tournament as the leading scorer with 12 goals in 7 games and the Soviets won the silver medal. He finished his three-year World Junior career with a tournament-record 27 goals, to go with 39 points, in 21 games. Bure later competed in the 1991 World Championships, his second international appearance of the year. He improved on his previous year's total with 11 points in 11 games, tied for the team lead with Valeri Kamensky, and helped the Soviets to a bronze medal finish. Bure was named to the tournament's second All-Star team. The 1991 team marked the last World Championships for the USSR, as the country was dissolved later that year.

=== Senior ===
Bure was set to represent the Soviet Union at the 1991 Canada Cup, however after turning down a three-year contract with his Russian club, CSKA Moscow, he was left off the final roster.

Bure played his first international tournament for Russia in preliminary games for the inaugural 1996 World Cup (the successor tournament to the Canada Cup). Bure had recently recovered from reconstructive surgery to his right knee, and had begun practicing with the Russian national team where he was reunited on a line with Fedorov and Mogilny, the first and only time the three of them would play together at the senior level; the line was considered "perhaps the best forward line on earth" at the time. However Bure bruised a kidney in one of the games and was forced to miss the main tournament.

As with the 1991 Canada Cup, controversy ensued when Bure refused to sign a petition organized by national team veteran Viacheslav Fetisov. With the Russian Ice Hockey Federation dealing with internal corruption, the petition called for the ouster of a few select Russian ice hockey officials. In response, Bure explained, "I do not sign petitions. I believe I should work – play hockey. Petitions to the federation or to Olympic committees do not interest me."

Two years later, Bure made his Olympic debut with Russia at the 1998 Winter Games in Nagano. He helped his team to advance to the gold medal game after a five-goal game in Russia's 7–4 semifinal win against Finland. The Russians lost the gold medal game to the Czech Republic, ending with silver. Bure finished with a tournament-high nine goals to be named the top forward, and though he recorded no assists, placed third in point-scoring with nine points in six games.

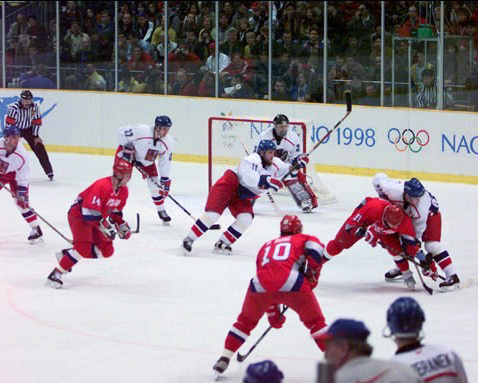
Bure at the 1998 Winter Olympics in Nagano. He scored nine goals in six games in that tournament.

Bure's next international tournament was the 2000 World Championships, held in Saint Petersburg. The Russians had a disappointing tournament and finished eleventh. In six games, Bure managed four goals and an assist. Two years later, Bure made his second Olympic appearance at the 2002 Games in Salt Lake City, playing with a fractured hand. Bure finished his final international tournament as a player with two goals and an assist in six games while Russia won the bronze medal.

On the announcement of his retirement in 2005, Bure was named Russia's Olympic general manager, succeeding Viacheslav Fetisov. He promised to put an end to the Russian Hockey Federation's history of internal conflict and player boycotts, saying, "You won't see such a mess with the national team that you've seen here before," and that "You won't see grouchy players here anymore. Only those who really want to play for Russia will be called into the team." As general manager, Bure chose the team for the 2006 Winter Olympics in Turin. The Russians failed to win a medal, losing to the Czech Republic in the bronze medal match. Leading up to the 2010 Winter Olympics in Vancouver, former Soviet national goaltender Vladislav Tretiak was named Bure's successor as Olympic general manager.

In December 2011, Bure was announced as one of the 2012 inductees into the International Ice Hockey Federation Hall of Fame. He was named alongside American Phil Housley, Finn Raimo Helminen and Czechoslovak Milan Nový in the annual class. The players were inducted in a ceremony in May 2012.

== Playing style ==
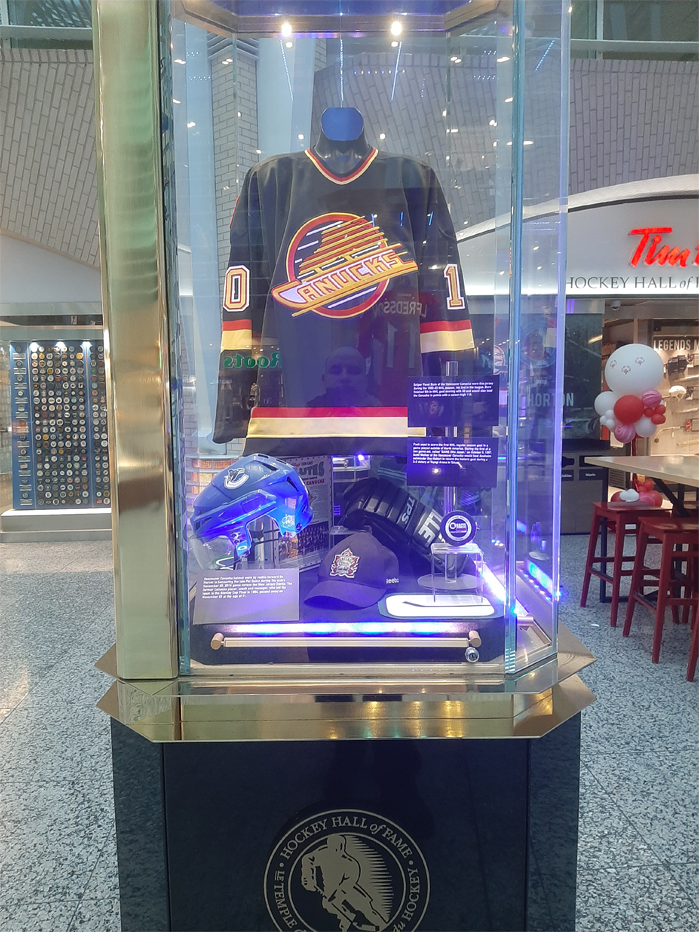
Pavel Bure's jersey worn in his second season on display at the Hockey Hall of Fame.

Bure's playing style reflected the speed, skill, and puck possession that was prominent in Soviet Union hockey programs. The most prevalent aspects of his game were his skating speed, agility, and acceleration, which earned him his nickname the "Russian Rocket". He was able to use his quickness to separate himself from defenders, to retrieve pucks before the opposition could in all zones of the ice, and to skate the length of the ice on many occasions. In a 1993 poll of NHL coaches conducted by hockey writer Bob McKenzie, Bure was named the league's best skater with eight of twenty-one votes, twice as many votes as any other player. One coach noted: "Bure has the best combination of speed, agility, and balance ... He can also use change of speed better than anybody in the league right now."

During Bure's rehabilitation period, following his first major knee injury in 1995, Canucks' conditioning coach Peter Twist noticed that his skating style was distinct in comparison to typical North American players. He explained: "Most players skate on their inside edge and push off at a 45-degree angle, but Bure starts on his outer edge and rolls over to his inside edge and pushes back straighter on his stride ... he gets more power and force in his stride to get up to top speed quicker." his skating was also complemented by his ability to deke out defenders and goaltenders at top speeds, making him capable of routinely starting end-to-end rushes. However, several knee injuries, and the resulting reconstructive surgeries, compromised the speed that defined Bure's game, ultimately leading to his retirement.

Early in Bure's career, he was noted for playing a strong two-way game. Having joined Pat Quinn's defensive-minded Canucks in 1991, Bure's transition to the NHL was cited as being easier than that of his countryman, Igor Larionov, due to his quick adjustment to the team's defensive demands. Regarding Bure's first NHL game against the Winnipeg Jets, reporter Mike Beamish explained that "hockey fans marvelled at his offensive thrusts, but hockey people were taken by a singular display of jet-powered defensive diligence. On one play, after the Canucks were caught deep in the Winnipeg zone, the Russian winger raced back and almost single-handedly foiled a two-on-one Jets' rush, making up a half-rink disadvantage." Bure was used on the team's penalty kill for his entire tenure with the Canucks, and was proficient at generating shorthanded chances, pressuring the opposition with his quickness and positioning in the defensive zone. During the 1992 Stanley Cup playoffs, commentator and ex-NHL coach Harry Neale commented, "I like the effort he gives it when he doesn't have the puck. We all know what he can do when he thinks he can score, but he's killing penalties, he's checking, doing a lot of things." Bure tied for second-place on Bob McKenzie's 1993 coaches poll for the NHL's best penalty killer. He was also voted the league's second-best stickhandler that season and garnered recognition as one of the smartest players in the NHL.

Sports journalists Damien Cox and Stephen Brunt wrote about Bure during the 1994 Stanley Cup playoffs that he was a "two-way dynamo," accounting for "several bodychecks he handed out on the night" and for his defensive abilities as he stayed on the ice in the last minutes of a one-goal playoff match against the Toronto Maple Leafs. They spoke highly of his creativity as well, recognizing him as "someone who sees in his game a world of possibilities that just never occur to others," praising his "sheer elegance and imagination" and characterizing his hockey sense as "ho-hum brilliance from the most explosive player in the sport". Brunt called him "a nonpareil, a van Gogh, a Picasso, a Charlie Parker". During the 1993–94 season, Bure demonstrated his strong playmaking abilities, helping linemate and friend Gino Odjick score a career-high 16 goals in a single season, more than twice the number of goals Odjick would score in any other year separated from Bure, and doubling his career goal totals up to that point in his career. According to teammate Cliff Ronning in 1994, "we play a much sounder game defensively when Pavel's flying, as he was in the first period". Former Canuck teammate Jyrki Lumme spoke of Bure as a player and teammate, "That guy does something spectacular every time ... it's frustrating to go against him in practice because he's all over the place. He makes everybody on our team better."

During his time with the Canucks, Bure won the team's Most Exciting Player Award, as voted by the fans, a record five times (tied with Tony Tanti), from 1992 to 1995, and once more in 1998. Trevor Linden, who had played with Bure for seven seasons, said following Bure's retirement, "I don't know if I've ever seen or played with a player that's brought people out of their seats like that." During the 1994 Stanley Cup Final, Rangers coach Mike Keenan, who later coached Bure for one-and-a-half seasons in Vancouver, called him "perhaps the most electrifying forward in the league". The Canucks renamed the award the Pavel Bure Most Exciting Player Award in his honour in 2013.

Bure has been described as a pure goal scorer and is statistically among the top players in NHL history in that regard. In addition to having reached the 50-goal mark in his career five times, and the 60-goal mark twice, his .623 goals per game average is third among the top 100 goal scorers in NHL history, behind Mike Bossy and Mario Lemieux. Michael Farber of the Montreal Gazette described Bure as "the most dangerous scorer in the National Hockey League with the continued absence of Mario Lemieux because Bure can beat a defence with his speed, his strength, his mind. Bure isn't a scorer as much as he is a permanent late-night television guest; he is to highlight packages what Terri Garr is to Letterman."

== Personal life ==
=== Family ===
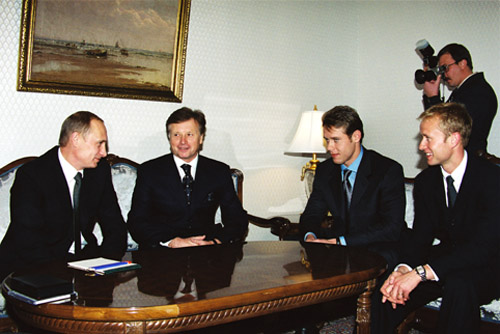
Pavel Bure (second from right) along with his brother Valeri Bure (far right) and Russian Olympic Committee President Leonid Tyagachev (second from left), meet with Russian President Vladimir Putin (far left) on November 14, 2001.

Bure comes from an athletic family; his father Vladimir, who is of Swiss descent (his side of the family originated from Furna, Switzerland), was an Olympic swimmer who competed for the Soviet Union in the 1968, 1972, and 1976 Olympic Games, where he won four medals. Bure retained his father as his personal trainer well into his playing career, before severing ties with him in 1997. Bure's paternal grandfather, Valeri Bure, played goalkeeper for the national water polo team. Both Pavel and his younger brother Valeri became estranged from their father and his second wife, Julia, along with their half-sister Katya, by 1998. Neither brother has explained a reason for the split.

Named after their grandfather, Bure's younger brother, Valeri, was also a hockey player, spending 10 years in the NHL. The two siblings played with each other briefly as members of the Florida Panthers, after Valeri was traded there in 2001, and played together at the 1998 and 2002 Winter Olympics.

The Bure family made precious watches for the Russian tsars from 1815 until 1917, and Bure was named after his great-grandfather, a watchmaker to Tsar Alexander III. As craftspersons to the imperial family, the Bures were granted noble status. After Bure sustained his first serious knee injury in 1995, he pursued the watchmaking business during his rehabilitation period in an attempt to revive the family business. Fifty replicas of the same watches his ancestors made for the Russian imperial family were made and sold at US$30,000 each. Bure presented three of the gold replicas to Russian president Boris Yeltsin, Prime Minister Viktor Chernomyrdin and Moscow mayor Yuriy Luzhkov.

=== Relationships ===
Five days after arriving in North America from Moscow with his father and brother on September 6, 1991, (his mother Tatiana arrived two months later), Bure married an American fashion model, later revealed to be Jayme Bohn, in a civil ceremony. The marriage was allegedly set up by Bure's agents as a preventative measure against deportation in the event he and the Canucks could not come to terms with a contract. Bure derived no immigration benefit from the marriage, which was dissolved the following year. Bohn became a costume designer in the film and television industry.

After being linked to girlfriend Dahn Bryan, a model and actress, early in his NHL career, Bure shared a relationship with tennis star and fellow Russian Anna Kournikova. The two met in 1999 when she was still linked to Bure's former Russian teammate Sergei Fedorov. Bure and Kournikova were reported to have been engaged in 2000 after reporter Andrew Greven took a photo of them together in a Florida restaurant where Bure supposedly asked Kournikova to marry him. As the story made headlines in Russia, where they were both heavily followed in the media as celebrities, Bure and Kournikova both denied any engagement. Kournikova, 10 years younger than Bure, was 18 years old at the time. The following year, Kournikova and Fedorov were married in Moscow, though they soon divorced.

Bure married 23-year-old model Alina Khasanova on October 10, 2009, in Moscow, with 300 guests present. Pravda has reported, however, that the couple, who had known each other for four years, had officially married on October 10, 2008, in Miami. Together they have three children: Pavel Jr., Palina and Anastasia. Pavel Jr. was born on April 23, 2013; Palina was born on July 20, 2015. Their third child, a daughter named Anastasia, was born on 28 December 2018.

=== Politics ===
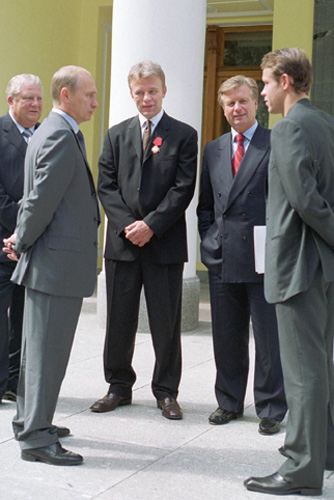
Russian President Vladimir Putin (second from left) speaks with Bure (far right) in August 2001.

Bure is known to have frequently played ice hockey with Russian president Vladimir Putin, but has denied having any political ambitions himself in an interview with a Swedish newspaper in 2019.

=== Legal activity ===
In 2002, Bure sued the Russian newspaper the eXile for publishing an article stating he broke up with Kournikova because she had two vaginas. Although the newspapers' editorial staff claimed the story was a mere joke, the court ruled in favour of Bure in the amount of 500,000 rubles (US$17,770), and ordered a retraction to be printed. Two years later, on December 27, 2004, the Russian cosmetics chain Arbat Prestige published a story in their free promotional paper that Bure had bragged about Kournikova losing her virginity to him. Shortly thereafter, on January 31, 2005, Bure sued Arbat Prestige for 300 million rubles (US$10.65 million) in a court in Moscow. He also demanded the company print a retraction and apology in a future paper. The court ruled in favour of Bure in November 2005. However, the amount was reduced from 300 million to approximately 320,000 rubles.

On October 31, 2006, nearly a year after his retirement, Bure filed another suit after being kicked off a British Airways flight by the pilot, having been mistaken for a rowdy soccer fan. Despite an apology from the airline company in June 2007, Bure took the issue to court, suing British Airways for 20 million rubles. In late August 2007, a Russian court ruled in favour of Bure in the amount of 67,000 rubles.

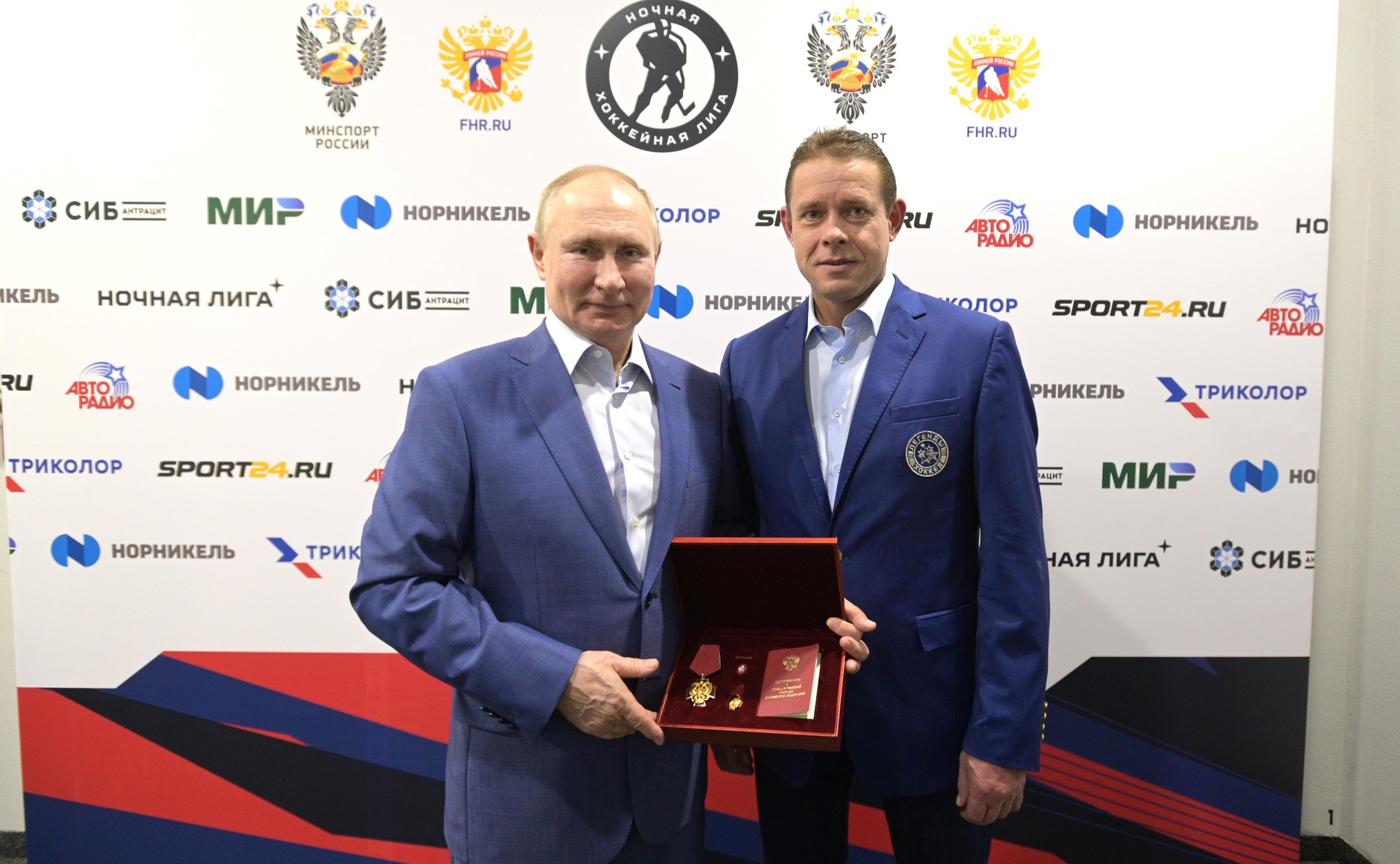
Presentation of the Order "For Merit to the Fatherland", 4th class (May 10, 2021)

=== Alleged Mafia connections ===
During Bure's playing career, much speculation surrounded Russian NHL players and their potential ties to the Russian mafia both as victims and associates. As Soviet players began defecting to the NHL, many cases of extortion began surfacing. The Russian mafia was targeting the players' families still living in Russia. Former teammate Alexander Mogilny was a victim of such an extortion attempt in 1994, while Bure was reported to have made payments amounting to several thousand dollars to Russian extortionists in 1993. Three years later, in 1996, American sports network ESPN aired reports alleging Bure was a potential associate of the Russian mafia because of his relationship with friend and business partner Anzor Kikalishvili, known to both Russian and American police as a suspected criminal and possible Russian mob boss. Bure was revealed to hold a position as vice president in the sports company Twenty First Century Association, owned by Kikalishvili, and reportedly believed by the U.S. Federal Bureau of Investigation to be a mafia front worth at least US$100 million in illicit funds. While Bure did not deny his business and personal relationships with Kikalishvili, he refuted reports Kikalishvili was involved in any criminal activity.

Speculation resurfaced in 1999, as Bure was included in an investigation aired by the CBC investigative news program The Fifth Estate that made several supposed associations between Soviet NHL players and the Russian mafia. An allegation arose that Bure's former CSKA teammate Slava Fetisov used a company, of which he was president, to launder money for Vyacheslav Ivankov, considered the "Russian godfather" in North America. Bure's relationship with Kikalishvili continued to be questioned. Bure denied Kikalishvili's involvement in any criminal activity, dismissing the allegations as "rumours".

== Career statistics ==
=== Regular season and playoffs ===
Bold indicates led league

			Regular season					Playoffs
Season	Team	League	GP	G	A	Pts	PIM	GP	G	A	Pts	PIM
1987–88	CSKA Moscow	Soviet	5	1	1	2	0	—	—	—	—	—
1988–89	CSKA Moscow	Soviet	32	17	9	26	8	—	—	—	—	—
1989–90	CSKA Moscow	Soviet	46	14	10	24	20	—	—	—	—	—
1990–91	CSKA Moscow	Soviet	44	35	11	46	24	—	—	—	—	—
1991–92	Vancouver Canucks	NHL	65	34	26	60	30	13	6	4	10	14
1992–93	Vancouver Canucks	NHL	83	60	50	110	69	12	5	7	12	8
1993–94	Vancouver Canucks	NHL	76	**60**	47	107	86	24	**16**	15	31	40
1994–95	Spartak Moscow	IHL	1	2	0	2	2	—	—	—	—	—
1994–95	EV Landshut	DEL	1	3	0	3	2	—	—	—	—	—
1994–95	Vancouver Canucks	NHL	44	20	23	43	47	11	7	6	13	10
1995–96	Vancouver Canucks	NHL	15	6	7	13	8	—	—	—	—	—
1996–97	Vancouver Canucks	NHL	63	23	32	55	40	—	—	—	—	—
1997–98	Vancouver Canucks	NHL	82	51	39	90	48	—	—	—	—	—
1998–99	Florida Panthers	NHL	11	13	3	16	4	—	—	—	—	—
1999–2000	Florida Panthers	NHL	74	**58**	36	94	16	4	1	3	4	2
2000–01	Florida Panthers	NHL	82	**59**	33	92	58	—	—	—	—	—
2001–02	Florida Panthers	NHL	56	22	27	49	56	—	—	—	—	—
2001–02	New York Rangers	NHL	12	12	8	20	6	—	—	—	—	—
2002–03	New York Rangers	NHL	39	19	11	30	16	—	—	—	—	—
Soviet totals			127	67	31	98	52	—	—	—	—	—
NHL totals			702	437	342	779	484	64	35	35	70	74

=== International ===
Year	Team	Event	GP	G	A	Pts	PIM
1988	Soviet Union	U17	—	—	—	—	—
1988	Soviet Union	EJC	6	10	0	10	2
1989	Soviet Union	WJC	7	8	6	14	4
1989	Soviet Union	EJC	6	5	6	11	4
1990	Soviet Union	WJC	7	7	3	10	10
1990	Soviet Union	WC	10	2	4	6	10
1990	Soviet Union	GG	5	4	1	5	—
1991	Soviet Union	WJC	7	12	3	15	31
1991	Soviet Union	WC	10	3	8	11	2
1998	Russia	OLY	6	9	0	9	2
2000	Russia	WC	6	4	1	5	10
2002	Russia	OLY	6	2	1	3	8
Junior totals^{a}			33	42	17	59	51
Senior totals^{b}			38	20	14	34	32

^{a} does not include 1988 Quebec Esso Cup (U17)
^{b} does not include the 1990 Goodwill Games

== Awards and honours ==
Award	Year
NHL
Calder Memorial Trophy	1992
NHL All-Star Game	1993, 1994, 1996, 1997, 1998, 2000, 2001
NHL First All-Star Team	1994
NHL Second All-Star Team	2000, 2001
NHL All-Star Game MVP	2000
Maurice "Rocket" Richard Trophy	2000, 2001
Hockey Hall of Fame	2012
One of 100 Greatest NHL Players	2017
Vancouver Canucks
Most Exciting Player Award	1992, 1993, 1994, 1995, 1998
Molson Cup	1992, 1993, 1994, 1998
Cyrus H. McLean Trophy	1993, 1994, 1995, 1998
Cyclone Taylor Trophy	1993, 1994, 1998
International
WJC best forward	1989
WJC All-Star team	1989
World Championship second All-Star team	1991
Olympic Games best forward	1998
IIHF Hall of Fame	2012
Soviet
IIHF European Champions Cup winner	1988, 1989, 1990
Soviet champion	1988, 1989
Soviet Championship League Rookie of the Year	1989

== Records ==
=== Team ===
==== Vancouver Canucks ====
- Vancouver Canucks' single-season record, most points by a rookie – 60 in 1991–92 (tied with Ivan Hlinka, 1981–82 and Elias Pettersson, 2018–19)
- Vancouver Canucks' single-season record, most goals – 60 in 1992–93 and 1993–94
- Vancouver Canucks' all-time playoffs record, most goals – 34 (tied with Trevor Linden)
- Vancouver Canucks' all-time record, most shorthanded goals – 24
- Vancouver Canucks' single-game record, most goals – four versus the Winnipeg Jets on October 12, 1992 (tied with Rosaire Paiement, Bobby Schmautz, Rick Blight, Petri Skriko, Greg Adams, Tony Tanti, Martin Gélinas, Markus Näslund, Daniel Sedin, and Brock Boeser)

==== Florida Panthers ====
- Florida Panthers' single-season record, most goals – 59 in 2000–01

=== International ===
- World Junior Championships all-time record, most goals – 27 in 21 games (1989–1991)
- Olympic Games single-game record, most goals – five (1998; semifinal vs. Finland)

=== NHL ===
- NHL record, most goals scored in proportion to team – 29.5% of the Florida Panthers' goals in 2000–01.

== Transactions ==
- June 9, 1989 – Drafted by the Vancouver Canucks in the sixth round, 113th overall, in the 1989 NHL entry draft.
- October 31, 1991 – Signed by the Vancouver Canucks to a four-year, $3.5 million contract.
- June 16, 1994 – Re-signed by the Vancouver Canucks to a five-year, $24.5 million contract.
- January 17, 1999 – Traded by the Vancouver Canucks, along with Bret Hedican, Brad Ference and Vancouver's third-round draft choice (Robert Fried) in 2000, to the Florida Panthers in exchange for Ed Jovanovski, Dave Gagner, Mike Brown, Kevin Weekes and Florida's first-round draft choice (Nathan Smith) in 2000.
- February 8, 1999 – Signed by the Florida Panthers to a five-year, $47.5 million deal.
- March 18, 2002 – Traded by the Florida Panthers, along with Florida's second-round draft choice in 2002 (Lee Falardeau), to the New York Rangers in exchange for Igor Ulanov, Filip Novak, the Rangers' first-round draft choice in 2002 (Eric Nystrom), the Rangers' second-round draft choice in 2002 (Rob Globke) and the Rangers fourth-round draft choice in 2003 (later traded to the Atlanta Thrashers; Atlanta selected Guillaume Desbiens).

== See also ==
- List of NHL statistical leaders
- List of NHL players with 50-goal seasons
- List of NHL players with 100-point seasons
- Notable families in the NHL

== Notes ==
Awards and achievements
Preceded by Ed Belfour	Winner of the Calder Memorial Trophy; 1992	Succeeded by Teemu Selanne
Preceded by Teemu Selanne	NHL Goal Leader; 1994	Succeeded by Peter Bondra
Preceded by Teemu Selanne	Winner of the Rocket Richard Trophy; 2000 and 2001	Succeeded by Jarome Iginla
Sporting positions
Preceded by Scott Mellanby	Florida Panthers captain 2001–02 with Paul Laus	Succeeded by Olli Jokinen
Preceded by Aleksandr Smirnov	Russian Olympic captain 1998	Succeeded by Igor Larionov
Preceded by Viacheslav Fetisov	Russian Olympic general manager 2006	Succeeded by Vladislav Tretiak
