= 1988 Quebec Esso Cup =

Tournament details
- Host country: Canada

Final positions
- Champions: Soviet Union (1st title)

The 1988 Quebec Esso Cup was an international under-17 ice hockey tournament held in Quebec, Canada. It was the second installment of what is now known as the World U-17 Hockey Challenge. The USSR, led by Pavel Bure, took their first ever gold medal in the tournament, while the Swedish team featuring Mats Sundin won the silver. The hosts Canada Quebec won their second consecutive medal in the tournament with the bronze.

== Challenge results ==
	Team
1st place, gold medalist(s)	Soviet Union
2nd place, silver medalist(s)	Sweden
3rd place, bronze medalist(s)	Canada Quebec
4	Canada Pacific
5	Finland
6	Canada Ontario
7	Canada West
8	United States EAST
9	Canada Atlantic
10	United States WEST

== See also ==
- 1988 World Junior Ice Hockey Championships
