= 2026 World U-17 Hockey Challenge =

Tournament details
- Host country: Canada
- Venue: 1 (in 1 host city)
- Dates: November 1–7, 2026
- Teams: 6

Final positions
- Champions: United States (3rd title)
- Runners-up: Czech Republic
- Third place: Canada Red
- Fourth place: Canada White

Tournament statistics
- Scoring leader: (Canada) White Maddox Schultz (17 points)

The 2026 World Under-17 Hockey Challenge was an ice hockey tournament that was held in Oakville, Ontario, Canada from November 1 to 7, 2026. It was the 34th edition of the tournament.

== Venues ==
Oakville, Ontario, Canada was the tournament host. It was the first time for the town to host of the tournament.

== Preliminary round ==
=== Group A ===
Team	Pld	W	OTW	OTL	L	GF	GA	GD	Pts
United States	2	1	0	0	1	17	7	+10	3
Canada Red	2	1	0	0	1	7	9	−2	3
Finland	2	1	0	0	1	6	14	−8	3

Source: https://www.hockeycanada.ca/national-championships/men/World-U17/2026/schedule-results/stats/schedule

==== Results ====
November 1, 2026	Canada Red	1 – 5	Finland	Sixteen Mile Sports Complex, Oakville

November 2, 2026	United States	4 – 6	Canada Red	Sixteen Mile Sports Complex, Oakville

November 3, 2026	Finland	1 – 13	United States	Sixteen Mile Sports Complex, Oakville

=== Group B ===
Team	Pld	W	OTW	OTL	L	GF	GA	GD	Pts
Czech Republic	2	1	0	1	0	8	7	+1	4
Canada White	2	1	0	0	1	11	8	+3	3
Sweden	2	0	1	0	1	5	9	−4	2

Source: https://www.hockeycanada.ca/national-championships/men/World-U17/2026/schedule-results/stats/schedule

==== Results ====
November 1, 2026	Canada White	4 – 6	Czech Republic	Sixteen Mile Sports Complex, Oakville

November 2, 2026	Czech Republic	2 – 3 PEN	Sweden	Sixteen Mile Sports Complex, Oakville

November 3, 2026	Sweden	2 – 7	Canada White	Sixteen Mile Sports Complex, Oakville

== Playoff round ==
Quarterfinals
B2	Canada White	8
A3	Finland	6
A2	Canada Red	6
B3	Sweden	1

Semifinals
B1	Czech Republic	4
B2	Canada Red	3
A1	United States	5
A2	Canada White	2

Final
B2	Czech Republic	0
A1	United States	3
Bronze medal game
B2	Canada Red	8
A2	Canada White	4
