= Maddox Schultz =

Canadian ice hockey player (born 2010)

- Born: March 15, 2010 (age 16) Medicine Hat, Alberta, Canada
- Height: 5 ft 10 in (178 cm)
- Weight: 181 lb (82 kg; 12 st 13 lb)
- Position: Forward
- Shoots: Left
- WHL team: Regina Pats
- NHL draft: Eligible 2028

Maddox Schultz (born March 15, 2010) is a Canadian junior ice hockey player who is a forward for the Regina Pats of the Western Hockey League (WHL). He is eligible for the 2028 NHL entry draft.

== Playing career ==
Schultz is often ranked as the top Canadian ice hockey player born in 2010, with one scout comparing his scoring and skating to Sidney Crosby.

Schultz was granted exceptional status to play U18 AAA as a 14-year-old, after putting up 63 goals and 134 points in 27 games with the Regina Pat Blues. Schultz won the provincial championship as a member of the Pat Blues.

After being down 3 goals playing for the Regina Pat Canadians, Schultz attracted attention at the Circle K Classic, scoring four goals, including the game-winner, in 7-6 OT comeback win. In his rookie season, he put up 24 goals and 52 points through 27 games and lead the under-18 league in scoring. Schultz was the lead-scorer of the season, leading the Canadians to a first-place finish in the league with 93 points in 44 games. Playing for the Canadians, Schultz defeated the Moose Jaw Winmar Warriors to claim the team’s first SMAAAHL title since 2017 as the top male U18 AAA team in Saskatchewan, advancing to the west regional playoffs. Schultz scored 20 points in just seven games, including the overtime winner, to win the 2025 Telus Cup.

Schultz chose not to apply for WHL exceptional player status, owing to a rule change, the “Western Canadian Development Model” pilot, which allows players previously granted exceptional status, to play half of a season with their respective WHL club without applying for further exceptional status. The consensus first overall prospect leading into the 2025 WHL Prospects Draft, Schultz would be drafted by his hometown Regina Pats.

== International ==
Schultz finished the 2026 Hlinka Gretzky Cup as the tournament’s scoring leader with 10 points in five games, winning a gold medal.

== Personal life ==
Schultz and his younger sister Sydney were born in Medicine Hat, Alberta, before moving to Regina, Saskatchewan in 2015.

Schultz began skating when he was two and originally trained as a figure skater before switching to hockey when he was eight. Both of his parents are figure skating coaches and created a program for him to hone his skills.
