= 2014–15 Vancouver Canucks season =

NHL hockey team season

2014–15 Vancouver Canucks
- Division: 2nd Pacific
- Conference: 5th Western
- 2014–15 record: 48–29–5
- Home record: 24–15–2
- Road record: 24–14–3
- Goals for: 242
- Goals against: 222

Team information
- General manager: Jim Benning
- Coach: Willie Desjardins
- Captain: Henrik Sedin
- Alternate captains: Kevin Bieksa; Daniel Sedin
- Arena: Rogers Arena
- Average attendance: 18,710 (98.9%)
- Minor league affiliates: Utica Comets (AHL); Kalamazoo Wings (ECHL)

Team leaders
- Goals: Radim Vrbata (31)
- Assists: Daniel Sedin (56)
- Points: Daniel Sedin (76)
- Penalty minutes: Derek Dorsett (175)
- Plus/minus: Alexander Edler (+13)
- Wins: Ryan Miller (29)
- Goals against average: Eddie Lack (2.45)

The 2014–15 Vancouver Canucks season was the franchise's 45th season in the NHL. The Canucks managed to qualify for the playoffs for the first time since the 2012–13 season. The team would not appear in the post season again until the 2019-20 NHL Season.

== Off-season ==
On April 8, 2014, after missing the playoffs for the first time since 2008, the team fired general manager Mike Gillis. One day later, ownership hired former Canucks captain Trevor Linden as team president, to assist in the search for a new general manager. Three weeks after Linden was hired, the Canucks announced that both head coach John Tortorella and assistant coach Mike Sullivan, who had only just been hired prior to the start of the 2013–14 season, were fired. Throughout the search for Vancouver's new general manager, it was speculated that Linden's preferred candidate was Jim Benning, who was serving as an assistant general manager for the Boston Bruins. On May 21, the Canucks confirmed that Benning had been hired as their new general manager. One of Benning's first changes to the roster was buying out David Booth, who had one year remaining on his contract. As a result of the buyout, Booth became an unrestricted free agent, and he will receive $1,583,333 per year (over the next two seasons) from the Canucks; Booth's buyout salary will not be applied to Vancouver's salary cap. The next major task for the Canucks was finding a new head coach. Among the candidates Benning interviewed were New York Rangers assistant coach Scott Arniel, and former Pittsburgh Penguins coach Dan Bylsma. Additionally, Texas Stars head coach Willie Desjardins was also one the coaches Benning was long rumoured to have interest in. However, Benning was not able to interview Desjardins until late June, as Desjardins had just won the Calder Cup with Texas. On June 23, the Canucks officially introduced Desjardins as the 18th head coach in Canucks history. The next major tasks facing Benning were dealing with the trade request of Ryan Kesler, and preparing for the draft on June 27. On draft day, Benning completed a series of trades before the Canucks even made their first pick. Jason Garrison was traded to the Tampa Bay Lightning for a 2nd-round draft pick, and then Ryan Kesler was traded to the Anaheim Ducks for Nick Bonino, Luca Sbisa, the twenty-fourth overall pick, and a 3rd-round draft pick. Benning then flipped Anaheim's 3rd-round pick to the New York Rangers, in exchange for Derek Dorsett. On June 28 (the second day of the draft), Benning acquired Linden Vey from the Los Angeles Kings, in exchange for Tampa Bay's 2nd-round pick (acquired the day before in the Garrison trade). As a result of trading away Roberto Luongo in March, the Canucks were left with a goalie tandem of Eddie Lack and Jacob Markstrom, who together had combined for 88 games of NHL experience. Thus, Benning's first move on July 1 was to sign free-agent goalie Ryan Miller to a 3-year, $18 million contract, in order to bring a veteran presence to Vancouver's goaltending position. Benning's next major transaction occurred only one day after acquiring Miller, as he signed former Phoenix Coyotes winger Radim Vrbata to a 2-year, $10 million contract. On July 3, Benning signed restricted free agent Zack Kassian to a 2-year, $3.5 million deal. On July 5, the Canucks re-signed defenceman Christopher Tanev to a 1-year, $2 million contract, only hours before the deadline to file for salary arbitration. On July 7, Benning named Doug Lidster as an assistant coach for the Canucks; Lidster had also recently served as an assistant coach to new Canucks head coach Willie Desjardins on the Texas Stars.

== Regular season ==
October

November

On November 4, rookie Bo Horvat made his NHL debut against the Colorado Avalanche; it was a winning debut for Horvat as the Canucks rally from a 2-0 deficit to defeat the Colorado Avalanche 5-2. On November 20, Bo Horvat scored his first NHL goal against the Anaheim Ducks, the Canucks went onto lose the game 4-3 in a shootout. On November 23, Daniel Sedin played his 1000th NHL game against the Chicago Blackhawks; the Canucks went on to defeat the Blackhawks by a final score of 4-1, forward Jannik Hansen also scored his first career hat trick this game.

December

The Vancouver Canucks began struggling after losing to the Toronto Maple Leafs 5–2. They lost five games in a row and finally ended their struggles against the Calgary Flames with a 3–2 win in overtime.

January

February

On February 22, Ryan Miller was injured in shutout win over New York Islanders forcing Eddie Lack into the game. He would miss the next 22 games. Jacob Markstrom was called in from the Utica Comets.

March

Jacob Markstrom started against San Jose Sharks on March 3, but he was removed after he gave up three goals in four shots as the Canucks lost to the Sharks 6-2. Markstrom finally was able to win against Arizona Coyotes with a 3–1 victory

April

Canucks clinched their playoff spot after a 2–1 victory against Los Angeles Kings.

== Playoffs ==
The Vancouver Canucks entered the playoffs as the Pacific Division's second seed. This was the seventh playoff meeting for these teams with Calgary having won four of the six previous series. Their most recent meeting was in the 2004 Western Conference Quarterfinals, which Calgary won in seven games. The Flames qualified for the playoffs for the first time since 2009. The teams split this year's four-game regular season series, with each team winning once at home and once on the road.

The Flames defeated the Canucks in six games. Calgary rallied from a one-goal deficit in Game 1, as David Jones tied the game 7:59 into the third and Kris Russell scored the winning goal with 29.6 seconds left to give the Flames a 2–1 win. The Canucks tied the series with a 4–1 win, as goalie Eddie Lack made 22 out of 23 saves and Alex Burrows recorded two assists. With 1:17 left to play, a fight broke out that resulted in 132 penalty minutes, with the Flames' Deryk Engelland given a game misconduct for instigating it, but eventually the league rescinded Engelland's penalty and instead fined Calgary head coach Bob Hartley $50,000 for his responsibility for the incident. Jonas Hiller made 23 saves to help give the Flames to a 4–2 win in Game 3. In Game 4, Calgary scored three first-period goals out of seven shots off of Lack. Ryan Miller replaced Lack to start the second period, but Hiller made 28 total saves en route to a 3–1 win.[58] Miller then made 20 saves and Daniel Sedin scored the winning goal 1:47 into the third period to help give the Canucks to a 2–1 win in Game 5. In Game 6, Hartley pulled Hiller after he allowed two goals on his first three shots, and put Karri Ramo in net. The Flames tied the game in the second period, and then Matt Stajan scored what proved to be the game-winning goal late in the third period. Two empty net goals in the final minute of the game sealed the series victory for the Flames.

== Standings ==
Pacific Division
Pos	Team	GP	W	L	OTL	ROW	GF	GA	GD	Pts
1	z – Anaheim Ducks	82	51	24	7	43	236	226	+10	109
2	x – Vancouver Canucks	82	48	29	5	42	242	222	+20	101
3	x – Calgary Flames	82	45	30	7	41	241	216	+25	97
4	Los Angeles Kings	82	40	27	15	38	220	205	+15	95
5	San Jose Sharks	82	40	33	9	36	228	232	−4	89
6	Edmonton Oilers	82	24	44	14	19	198	283	−85	62
7	Arizona Coyotes	82	24	50	8	19	170	272	−102	56

Source: National Hockey League
x – Clinched playoff spot; z – Clinched conference

== Schedule and results ==
=== Pre-season ===
Pre-season game log: 5–2–0 (Home: 3–1–0; Road: 2–1–0)
#	Date	Visitor	Score	Home	OT	Decision	Attendance	Record	Recap
1	September 23	San Jose	2–4	Vancouver		Cannata	13,650	1–0–0	Recap
2^{[a]}	September 23	Vancouver	2–5	San Jose		Eriksson	6,810	1–1–0	Recap
3	September 25	Vancouver	3–1	Calgary		Lack	19,289	2–1–0	Recap
4	September 26	Calgary	0–3	Vancouver		Miller	18,482	3–1–0	Recap
5	September 29	Arizona	4–2	Vancouver		Miller	18,050	3–2–0	Recap
6	October 2	Vancouver	2–1	Edmonton		Lack	16,839	4–2–0	Recap
7	October 4	Edmonton	2–3	Vancouver		Miller	18,802	5–2–0	Recap
Notes:^{a} Game was played at Stockton Arena in Stockton, California.

Regular season

Game log

October: 7–3–0 (Home: 4–1–0; Road: 3–2–0)
#	Date	Visitor	Score	Home	OT	Decision	Attendance	Record	Pts	Recap
1	October 8	Vancouver	4–2	Calgary		Miller	19,289	1–0–0	2	Recap
2	October 11	Edmonton	4–5	Vancouver	SO	Miller	18,870	2–0–0	4	Recap
3	October 17	Vancouver	2–0	Edmonton		Miller	16,839	3–0–0	6	Recap
4	October 18	Tampa Bay	4–2	Vancouver		Lack	18,647	3–1–0	6	Recap
5	October 21	Vancouver	3–6	Dallas		Miller	15,678	3–2–0	6	Recap
6	October 23	Vancouver	4–1	St. Louis		Miller	16,099	4–2–0	8	Recap
7	October 24	Vancouver	3–7	Colorado		Lack	17,119	4–3–0	8	Recap
8	October 26	Washington	2–4	Vancouver		Miller	18,427	5–3–0	10	Recap
9	October 28	Carolina	1–4	Vancouver		Miller	18,234	6–3–0	12	Recap
10	October 30	Montreal	2–3	Vancouver	OT	Miller	18,870	7–3–0	14	Recap

November: 9–4–1 (Home: 3–2–1; Road: 6–2–0)
#	Date	Visitor	Score	Home	OT	Decision	Attendance	Record	Pts	Recap
11	November 1	Vancouver	3–2	Edmonton		Miller	16,839	8–3–0	16	Recap
12	November 2	Nashville	3–1	Vancouver		Lack	18,395	8–4–0	16	Recap
13	November 4	Vancouver	5–2	Colorado		Miller	13,221	9–4–0	18	Recap
14	November 6	Vancouver	3–2	San Jose		Miller	17,562	10–4–0	20	Recap
15	November 8	Vancouver	1–5	Los Angeles		Miller	18,230	10–5–0	20	Recap
16	November 9	Vancouver	2–1	Anaheim	SO	Lack	16,749	11–5–0	22	Recap
17	November 11	Ottawa	3–4	Vancouver	OT	Miller	18,775	12–5–0	24	Recap
18	November 14	Arizona	5–0	Vancouver		Miller	18,708	12–6–0	24	Recap
19	November 19	Vancouver	5–4	Edmonton		Miller	16,839	13–6–0	26	Recap
20	November 20	Anaheim	4–3	Vancouver	SO	Lack	18,870	13–6–1	27	Recap
21	November 23	Chicago	1–4	Vancouver		Miller	18,663	14–6–1	29	Recap
22	November 25	New Jersey	0–2	Vancouver		Miller	18,606	15–6–1	31	Recap
23	November 28	Vancouver	5–0	Columbus		Miller	14,121	16–6–1	33	Recap
24	November 30	Vancouver	3–5	Detroit		Miller	20,027	16–7–1	33	Recap

December: 5–4–2 (Home: 2–2–0; Road: 3–2–2)
#	Date	Visitor	Score	Home	OT	Decision	Attendance	Record	Pts	Recap
25	December 2	Vancouver	4–3	Washington		Miller	18,506	17–7–1	35	Recap
26	December 4	Vancouver	3–0	Pittsburgh		Lack	18,463	18–7–1	37	Recap
27	December 6	Vancouver	2–5	Toronto		Miller	19,346	18–8–1	37	Recap
28	December 7	Vancouver	3–4	Ottawa	OT	Lack	16,870	18–8–2	38	Recap
29	December 9	Vancouver	1–3	Montreal		Miller	21,286	18–9–2	38	Recap
30	December 13	NY Rangers	5–1	Vancouver		Miller	18,870	18–10–2	38	Recap
31	December 17	Dallas	2–0	Vancouver		Lack	18,755	18–11–2	38	Recap
32	December 20	Calgary	2–3	Vancouver	OT	Miller	18,747	19–11–2	40	Recap
33	December 22	Arizona	1–7	Vancouver		Miller	18,794	20–11–2	42	Recap
34	December 28	Vancouver	1–2	Anaheim	OT	Miller	17,374	20–11–3	43	Recap
35	December 30	Vancouver	3–1	San Jose		Miller	17,562	21–11–3	45	Recap

January: 6–6–0 (Home: 3–4–0; Road: 3–2–0)
#	Date	Visitor	Score	Home	OT	Decision	Attendance	Record	Pts	Recap
36	January 1	Los Angeles	3–2	Vancouver		Miller	18,870	21–12–3	45	Recap
37	January 3	Detroit	1–4	Vancouver		Miller	18,870	22–12–3	47	Recap
38	January 6	NY Islanders	2–3	Vancouver		Lack	18,562	23–12–3	49	Recap
39	January 8	Florida	3–1	Vancouver		Miller	18,799	23–13–3	49	Recap
40	January 10	Calgary	1–0	Vancouver		Lack	18,870	23–14–3	49	Recap
41	January 13	Vancouver	1–5	Nashville		Lack	15,726	23–15–3	49	Recap
42	January 15	Vancouver	4–0	Philadelphia		Miller	19,571	24–15–3	51	Recap
43	January 16	Vancouver	3–0	Carolina		Miller	13,093	25–15–3	53	Recap
44	January 19	Vancouver	2–1	Florida		Miller	9,373	26–15–3	55	Recap
45	January 20	Vancouver	1–4	Tampa Bay		Miller	18,517	26–16–3	55	Recap
46	January 27	Anaheim	4–0	Vancouver		Miller	18,813	26–17–3	55	Recap
47	January 30	Buffalo	2–5	Vancouver		Miller	18,570	27–17–3	57	Recap

February: 8–6–0 (Home: 4–2–0; Road: 4–4–0)
#	Date	Visitor	Score	Home	OT	Decision	Attendance	Record	Pts	Recap
48	February 1	Minnesota	4–2	Vancouver		Miller	18,438	27–18–3	57	Recap
49	February 3	Winnipeg	2–3	Vancouver	OT	Lack	18,509	28–18–3	59	Recap
50	February 5	San Jose	5–1	Vancouver		Miller	18,508	28–19–3	59	Recap
51	February 7	Pittsburgh	0–5	Vancouver		Miller	18,870	29–19–3	61	Recap
52	February 9	Vancouver	3–5	Minnesota		Miller	18,804	29–20–3	61	Recap
53	February 11	Vancouver	5–4	Chicago	OT	Lack	21,346	30–20–3	63	Recap
54	February 13	Boston	2–5	Vancouver		Miller	18,870	31–20–3	65	Recap
55	February 14	Vancouver	2–3	Calgary		Miller	19,289	31–21–3	65	Recap
56	February 16	Minnesota	2–3	Vancouver		Lack	18,465	32–21–3	67	Recap
57	February 19	Vancouver	5–4	NY Rangers	SO	Miller	18,006	33–21–3	69	Recap
58	February 20	Vancouver	2–4	New Jersey		Lack	14,822	33–22–3	69	Recap
59	February 22	Vancouver	4–0	NY Islanders		Miller	16,170	34–22–3	71	Recap
60	February 24	Vancouver	2–1	Boston		Lack	17,565	35–22–3	73	Recap
61	February 26	Vancouver	3–6	Buffalo		Lack	19,070	35–23–3	73	Recap

March: 10–4–2 (Home: 5–4–1; Road: 5–0–1)
#	Date	Visitor	Score	Home	OT	Decision	Attendance	Record	Pts	Recap
62	March 1	St. Louis	5–6	Vancouver	SO	Lack	18,870	36–23–3	75	Recap
63	March 3	San Jose	6–2	Vancouver		Markstrom	18,535	36–24–3	75	Recap
64	March 5	Vancouver	2–3	Arizona	SO	Lack	12,589	36–24–4	76	Recap
65	March 7	Vancouver	3–2	San Jose		Lack	17,562	37–24–4	78	Recap
66	March 9	Anaheim	1–2	Vancouver		Lack	18,557	38–24–4	80	Recap
67	March 12	Los Angeles	4–0	Vancouver		Lack	18,663	38–25–4	80	Recap
68	March 14	Toronto	1–4	Vancouver		Lack	18,870	39–25–4	82	Recap
69	March 17	Philadelphia	1–4	Vancouver		Lack	18,870	40–25–4	84	Recap
70	March 19	Columbus	6–2	Vancouver		Lack	18,668	40–26–4	84	Recap
71	March 21	Vancouver	4–1	Los Angeles		Lack	18,230	41–26–4	86	Recap
72	March 22	Vancouver	3–1	Arizona		Markstrom	12,405	42–26–4	88	Recap
73	March 24	Winnipeg	2–5	Vancouver		Lack	18,870	43–26–4	90	Recap
74	March 26	Colorado	4–1	Vancouver		Lack	18,870	43–27–4	90	Recap
75	March 28	Dallas	4–3	Vancouver	OT	Lack	18,595	43–27–5	91	Recap
76	March 30	Vancouver	4–1	St. Louis		Lack	19,204	44–27–5	93	Recap
77	March 31	Vancouver	5–4	Nashville	SO	Lack	17,113	45–27–5	95	Recap

April: 3–2–0 (Home: 3–0–0; Road: 0–2–0)
#	Date	Visitor	Score	Home	OT	Decision	Attendance	Record	Pts	Recap
78	April 2	Vancouver	1–3	Chicago		Lack	21,901	45–28–5	95	Recap
79	April 4	Vancouver	4–5	Winnipeg		Lack	15,016	45–29–5	95	Recap
80	April 6	Los Angeles	1–2	Vancouver	SO	Lack	18,870	46–29–5	97	Recap
81	April 9	Arizona	0–5	Vancouver		Lack	18,796	47–29–5	99	Recap
82	April 11	Edmonton	5–6	Vancouver	OT	Miller	18,870	48–29–5	101	Recap

Legend: Win (2 points) Loss (0 points) Overtime/shootout loss (1 point)

==== Detailed records ====
Western Conference
Central Division
Chicago Blackhawks	1–0–0	1–1–0	2–1–0	4	10	8
Colorado Avalanche	0–1–0	1–1–0	1–2–0	2	9	13
Dallas Stars	0–1–1	0–1–0	0–2–1	1	6	12
Minnesota Wild	1–1–0	0–1–0	1–2–0	2	8	11
Nashville Predators	0–1–0	1–1–0	1–2–0	2	7	12
St. Louis Blues	1–0–0	2–0–0	3–0–0	6	14	7
Winnipeg Jets	2–0–0	0–1–0	2–1–0	4	12	9
Total	5–4–1	5–6–0	10–10–1	21	66	72
Pacific Division
Opponent	Home	Away	Total	Pts.	Goals scored	Goals allowed
Anaheim Ducks	1–1–1	1–0–1	2–1–2	6	8	12
Arizona Coytes	2–1–0	1–0–1	3–1–1	7	17	10
Calgary Flames	1–1–0	1–1–0	2–2–0	4	9	8
Edmonton Oilers	2–0–0	3–0–0	5–0–0	10	21	15
Los Angeles Kings	1–2–0	1–1–0	2–3–0	4	9	14
San Jose Sharks	0–2–0	3–0–0	3–2–0	6	12	16
Vancouver Canucks	–	–	–	–	–	–
Total	7–7–1	10–2–2	17–9–3	37	76	75

Eastern Conference
Opponent	Home	Away	Total	Pts.	Goals scored	Goals allowed
Atlantic Division
Boston Bruins	1–0–0	1–0–0	2–0–0	4	7	3
Buffalo Sabres	1–0–0	0–1–0	1–1–0	2	8	8
Detroit Red Wings	1–0–0	0–1–0	1–1–0	2	7	6
Florida Panthers	0–1–0	1–0–0	1–1–0	2	3	4
Montreal Canadiens	1–0–0	0–1–0	1–1–0	2	4	5
Ottawa Senators	1–0–0	0–0–1	1–0–1	3	7	7
Tampa Bay Lightning	0–1–0	0–1–0	0–2–0	0	3	8
Toronto Maple Leafs	1–0–0	0–1–0	1–1–0	2	6	6
Total	6–2–0	2–5–1	8–7–1	17	45	47
Metropolitan Division
Carolina Hurricanes	1–0–0	1–0–0	2–0–0	4	7	1
Columbus Blue Jackets	0–1–0	1–0–0	1–1–0	2	7	6
New Jersey Devils	1–0–0	0–1–0	1–1–0	2	4	4
New York Islanders	1–0–0	1–0–0	2–0–0	4	7	2
New York Rangers	0–1–0	1–0–0	1–1–0	2	6	9
Philadelphia Flyers	1–0–0	1–0–0	2–0–0	4	8	1
Pittsburgh Penguins	1–0–0	1–0–0	2–0–0	4	8	0
Washington Capitals	1–0–0	1–0–0	2–0–0	4	8	5
Total	6–2–0	7–1–0	13–3–0	26	55	28

=== Playoffs ===
2015 Stanley Cup playoffs

Western Conference First Round vs. (P3) Calgary Flames: Calgary won series 4–2
#	Date	Visitor	Score	Home	OT	Canucks Goals	Flames Goals	Decision	Attendance	Series	Recap
1	April 15	Calgary	2–1	Vancouver		Horvat	Jones, Russell	Lack	18,870	0–1	Recap
2	April 17	Calgary	1–4	Vancouver		D. Sedin, Higgins, Kenins, Vrbata	Russell	Lack	18,870	1–1	Recap
3	April 19	Vancouver	2–4	Calgary		Matthias, Hansen	Bollig, Brodie, Bennett, Monahan	Lack	19,289	1–2	Recap
4	April 21	Vancouver	1–3	Calgary		H. Sedin	Gaudreau, Hudler, Bennett	Lack	19,289	1–3	Recap
5	April 23	Calgary	1–2	Vancouver		Bonino, D. Sedin	Jones	Miller	18,870	2–3	Recap
6	April 25	Vancouver	4–7	Calgary		McMillan, Hansen, Vrbata, Sbisa	Ferland (2), Monahan, Gaudreau, Hudler (2), Stajan	Miller	19,289	2–4	Recap

Legend: = Win = Loss
Bold italics = Player scored game-winning goal

== Player statistics ==
=== Skaters ===
Regular season

Player	GP	G	A	Pts	+/−	PIM
Daniel Sedin	82	20	56	76	+5	18
Henrik Sedin	82	18	55	73	+11	22
Radim Vrbata	79	31	32	63	+6	20
Nick Bonino	75	15	24	39	+7	22
Chris Higgins	77	12	24	36	+8	16
Alex Burrows	70	18	15	33	0	68
Jannik Hansen	81	16	17	33	−6	27
Alexander Edler	74	8	23	31	+13	54
Shawn Matthias	78	18	9	27	−3	16
Bo Horvat	68	13	12	25	−8	16
Derek Dorsett	79	7	18	25	+4	175
Linden Vey	75	10	14	24	−3	18
Dan Hamhuis	59	1	22	23	0	44
Yannick Weber	65	11	10	21	+4	30
Brad Richardson	45	8	13	21	0	34
Christopher Tanev	70	2	18	20	+8	12
Zack Kassian	42	10	6	16	−5	81
Kevin Bieksa	60	4	10	14	0	77
Ronalds Kenins	30	4	8	12	−2	8
Ryan Stanton	54	3	8	11	+9	35
Luca Sbisa	76	3	8	11	−8	46
Sven Baertschi^{†}	3	2	0	2	0	4
Adam Clendening^{†}	17	0	2	2	+1	8
Alex Biega	7	1	0	1	−2	0
Frank Corrado	10	1	0	1	−7	0
Tom Sestito	3	0	1	1	+1	7
Brandon McMillan^{†}	8	0	1	1	−1	0
Brandon DeFazio	2	0	0	0	0	0
Nicklas Jensen	5	0	0	0	−1	0
Totals	82	236	406	642	+31	858

Playoffs

Player	GP	G	A	Pts	+/−	PIM
Jannik Hansen	6	2	2	4	+1	0
Daniel Sedin	6	2	2	4	−1	0
Radim Vrbata	6	2	2	4	−2	0
Bo Horvat	6	1	3	4	+1	2
Henrik Sedin	6	1	3	4	−1	2
Nick Bonino	6	1	2	3	−2	4
Christopher Tanev	6	0	3	3	+4	0
Alexander Edler	6	0	3	3	+3	4
Ronalds Kenins	5	1	1	2	+2	4
Chris Higgins	6	1	1	2	0	2
Luca Sbisa	6	1	1	2	−2	7
Shawn Matthias	6	1	1	2	−3	10
Alex Burrows	3	0	2	2	+1	21
Brandon McMillan	2	1	0	1	+1	4
Dan Hamhuis	6	0	1	1	−2	16
Linden Vey	1	0	0	0	0	0
Sven Baertschi	2	0	0	0	0	0
Brad Richardson	5	0	0	0	−3	15
Kevin Bieksa	6	0	0	0	−1	9
Derek Dorsett	6	0	0	0	−3	20
Yannick Weber	6	0	0	0	−5	12
Totals	6	14	27	41	−12	132

=== Goaltenders ===
Regular season
Player	GP	GS	TOI	W	L	OT	GA	GAA	SA	SV%	SO	G	A	PIM
Ryan Miller	45	45	2,541:31	29	15	1	107	2.53	1,198	.911	6	0	0	0
Eddie Lack	41	35	2,323:57	18	13	4	95	2.45	1,201	.921	2	0	0	2
Jacob Markstrom	3	2	77:38	1	1	0	4	3.09	33	.879	0	0	0	0
Totals		82	4,943:06	48	29	5	206	2.50	2,432	.915	8	0	0	2

Playoffs
Player	GP	GS	TOI	W	L	GA	GAA	SA	SV%	SO	G	A	PIM
Ryan Miller	3	2	156:10	1	1	6	2.31	67	.910	0	0	0	0
Eddie Lack	4	4	198:16	1	3	10	3.03	88	.886	0	0	0	0
Totals		6	354:26	2	4	16	2.71	155	.897	0	0	0	0

^{†}Traded to Canucks mid-season. Stats reflect time with Canucks only.

== Notable achievements ==
=== Awards ===
Regular season
Player	Award	Awarded
Jannik Hansen	NHL First Star of the Week	November 24, 2014
Radim Vrbata	NHL All-Star game selection	January 10, 2015
Henrik Sedin	NHL Second Star of the Week	February 23, 2015

=== Milestones ===
Regular season
Player	Milestone	Reached
Linden Vey	1st NHL goal	October 11, 2014
Alexander Edler	500th NHL game	October 23, 2014
Ryan Miller	300th NHL win	October 28, 2014
Radim Vrbata	800th NHL game	October 28, 2014
Nick Bonino	200th NHL game	November 1, 2014
Chris Higgins	300th NHL point	November 1, 2014
Jannik Hansen	400th NHL game	November 1, 2014
Bo Horvat	1st NHL game	November 4, 2014
Brandon DeFazio	1st NHL game	November 9, 2014
Bo Horvat	1st NHL goal 1st NHL point	November 20, 2014
Bo Horvat	1st NHL assist	November 23, 2014
Jannik Hansen	1st NHL hat-trick	November 23, 2014
Daniel Sedin	1,000th NHL game	November 23, 2014
Nick Bonino	100th NHL point	November 28, 2014
Brad Richardson	500th NHL game	January 1, 2015
Henrik Sedin	200th NHL goal	January 3, 2015
Luca Sbisa	300th NHL game	January 8, 2015
Christopher Tanev	200th NHL game	January 19, 2015
Yannick Weber	200th NHL game	January 27, 2015
Ronalds Kenins	1st NHL game	January 30, 2015
Ronalds Kenins	1st NHL goal 1st NHL point	February 1, 2015
Ryan Stanton	100th NHL game	February 3, 2015
Radim Vrbata	500th NHL point	February 7, 2015
Ronalds Kenins	1st NHL assist	February 11, 2015
Shawn Matthias	1st NHL hat-trick	February 13, 2015
Ryan Miller	600th NHL game	February 13, 2015
Alex Biega	1st NHL game 1st NHL goal 1st NHL point	February 16, 2015
Jannik Hansen	100th NHL assist	February 16, 2015
Henrik Sedin	900th NHL point	March 3, 2015
Dan Hamhuis	800th NHL game	March 12, 2015
Shawn Matthias	400th NHL game	March 22, 2015
Derek Dorsett	400th NHL game	March 22, 2015
Henrik Sedin	700th NHL assist	April 6, 2015

Playoffs
Player	Milestone	Reached
Bo Horvat	1st NHL playoff game 1st NHL playoff goal 1st NHL playoff point	April 15, 2015
Ronalds Kenins	1st NHL playoff game	April 15, 2015
Eddie Lack	1st NHL playoff game	April 15, 2015
Bo Horvat	1st NHL playoff assist	April 17, 2015
Ronalds Kenins	1st NHL playoff goal 1st NHL playoff point	April 17, 2015
Eddie Lack	1st NHL playoff win	April 17, 2015
Shawn Matthias	1st NHL playoff goal	April 19, 2015
Ronalds Kenins	1st NHL playoff assist	April 19, 2015
Linden Vey	1st NHL playoff game	April 21, 2015
Sven Baertschi	1st NHL playoff game	April 23, 2015
Luca Sbisa	1st NHL playoff goal	April 25, 2015

=== Records ===
Player	Record	Date
Ryan Miller	First Canucks goaltender to post back-to-back road game shutouts in back-to-back days	January 16, 2015
Daniel Sedin	Most career power-play goals in Canucks history	February 7, 2015
Eddie Lack	Most saves by a Canuck goalie in a relief appearance without allowing a goal	February 22, 2015

== Transactions ==
The Canucks been involved in the following transactions:

=== Trades ===
Date	Details
June 27, 2014	To Vancouver Canucks: Nick Bonino; Luca Sbisa; 1st-round pick (24th overall) in 2014; 3rd-round pick (85th overall) in 2014	To Anaheim Ducks: Ryan Kesler; 3rd-round pick in 2015
June 27, 2014	To Vancouver Canucks: 2nd-round pick (50th overall) in 2014	To Tampa Bay Lightning: Jason Garrison; Jeff Costello; 7th-round pick in 2015
June 27, 2014	To Vancouver Canucks: Derek Dorsett	To New York Rangers: ANA's 3rd-round pick (85th overall) in 2014
June 28, 2014	To Vancouver Canucks: Linden Vey	To Los Angeles Kings: TBL's 2nd-round pick (50th overall) in 2014
November 20, 2014	To Vancouver Canucks: Will Acton	To Edmonton Oilers: Kellan Lain
November 25, 2014	To Vancouver Canucks: Andrey Pedan	To New York Islanders: Alexandre Mallet; 3rd-round pick (64th overall) in 2016
January 29, 2015	To Vancouver Canucks: Adam Clendening	To Chicago Blackhawks: Gustav Forsling
March 2, 2015	To Vancouver Canucks: Cory Conacher	To New York Islanders: Dustin Jeffrey
March 2, 2015	To Vancouver Canucks: Sven Baertschi	To Calgary Flames: 2nd-round pick (53rd overall) in 2015

=== Free agents acquired ===
Player	Date	Former team	Contract terms (in U.S. dollars)	Ref
Ryan Miller	July 1, 2014	St. Louis Blues	3 years, $18 million	
Bobby Sanguinetti	July 1, 2014	Atlant Moscow Oblast	1 year, $600,000	
Dustin Jeffrey	July 2, 2014	Dallas Stars	1 year, $600,000	
Cal O'Reilly	July 2, 2014	Utica Comets	1 year, $600,000	
Radim Vrbata	July 2, 2014	Phoenix Coyotes	2 years, $10 million	

=== Free agents lost ===
Player	Date	New team	Contract terms (in U.S. dollars)	Ref
Mike Santorelli	July 3, 2014	Toronto Maple Leafs	1 year, $1.5 million	
Jordan Schroeder	July 11, 2014	Minnesota Wild	2 years, $1.2 million	
Zac Dalpe	July 13, 2014	Buffalo Sabres	1 year, $700,000	
Benn Ferriero	July 16, 2014	St. Louis Blues	1 year, $600,000	
Jeremy Welsh	July 21, 2014	St. Louis Blues	1 year, $550,000	
David Booth	July 22, 2014	Toronto Maple Leafs	1 year, $1.1 million	

=== Claimed via waivers ===
Player	Former team	Date claimed off waivers
Brandon McMillan	Arizona Coyotes	February 12, 2015

=== Player signings ===
Player	Date	Contract terms (in U.S. dollars)	Ref
Alex Biega	July 1, 2014	1 year, $600,000 contract extension	
Zack Kassian	July 3, 2014	2-year, $3.5 million contract extension	
Yannick Weber	July 4, 2014	1 year, $850,000 contract extension	
Joe Cannata	July 4, 2014	1 year, $600,000 contract extension	
Peter Andersson	July 5, 2014	1 year, $600,000 contract extension	
Christopher Tanev	July 5, 2014	1 year, $2 million contract extension	
Linden Vey	July 14, 2014	1 year, $735,000 contract extension	
Darren Archibald	July 22, 2014	1 year, $600,000 contract extension	
Brandon DeFazio	July 22, 2014	1 year, $600,000 contract extension	
Jared McCann	July 24, 2014	3-year, $2.775 million entry-level contract	
Jake Virtanen	July 25, 2014	3-year, $2.775 million entry-level contract	

=== Suspensions and fines ===
Player	Explanation	Length	Salary	Date issued	Ref
Alex Burrows	Illegal check to the head of Montreal defenceman Alexei Emelin.	3 games	$72,580.65	October 31, 2014	
Jannik Hansen	Illegal check to the head of San Jose forward Tommy Wingels.	–	$5,000.00	December 31, 2014	

== Draft picks ==
The 2014 NHL entry draft was held on June 27–28, 2014, at the Wells Fargo Center in Philadelphia, Pennsylvania. The Canucks had following picks:

Round	#	Player	Pos	Nationality	College/junior/club team (league)
1	6	Jake Virtanen	RW	Canada	Calgary Hitmen (WHL)
1	24^{[a]}	Jared McCann	C	Canada	Sault Ste. Marie Greyhounds (OHL)
2	36	Thatcher Demko	G	United States	Boston College Eagles (NCAA D1)
3	66	Nikita Tryamkin	D	Russia	Avtomobilist Yekaterinburg (KHL)
5	126	Gustav Forsling	D	Sweden	Linköpings HC (SHL)
6	156	Kyle Pettit	C	Canada	Erie Otters (OHL)
7	186	Mackenze Stewart	D	Canada	Prince Albert Raiders (WHL)

Draft notes

- ^{a} Anaheim's first-round pick went to Vancouver, as the result of a trade on June 27, 2014, that sent Ryan Kesler and a third-round pick in 2015 to Anaheim, in exchange for Nick Bonino, Luca Sbisa, a third-round pick in 2014, and this pick.
- Vancouver's fourth-round pick went to Carolina, as the result of a trade on September 28, 2013, that sent Zac Dalpe and Jeremy Welsh to Vancouver, in exchange for Kellan Tochkin and this pick.
