= Fred J. Hume Award =

Ice hockey award

The Fred J. Hume Award is an annual award presented to the player deemed to be the most "unsung hero" for the Vancouver Canucks of the National Hockey League (NHL). It is voted by the fans and presented at the Canucks' last home game of the regular season.

The most recent recipient is Drew O'Connor, who won it for the first time in the 2025–26 season.

== History ==
The Fred J. Hume Award was first presented after the Canucks' inaugural NHL season in 1970–71 and was named after former Mayor of Vancouver Fred J. Hume, who was also owner of the Vancouver Canucks, while they were in the Western Hockey League (WHL), and an active campaigner to bring the NHL to Vancouver. Prior to being decided by a fan vote, the award was decided on by the Vancouver Canucks Booster Club before the organization dissolved in the 2000s.

The most times a Canucks player has won the award is three times, which was accomplished by Jannik Hansen (2011, 2013, and 2016).

== Winners ==
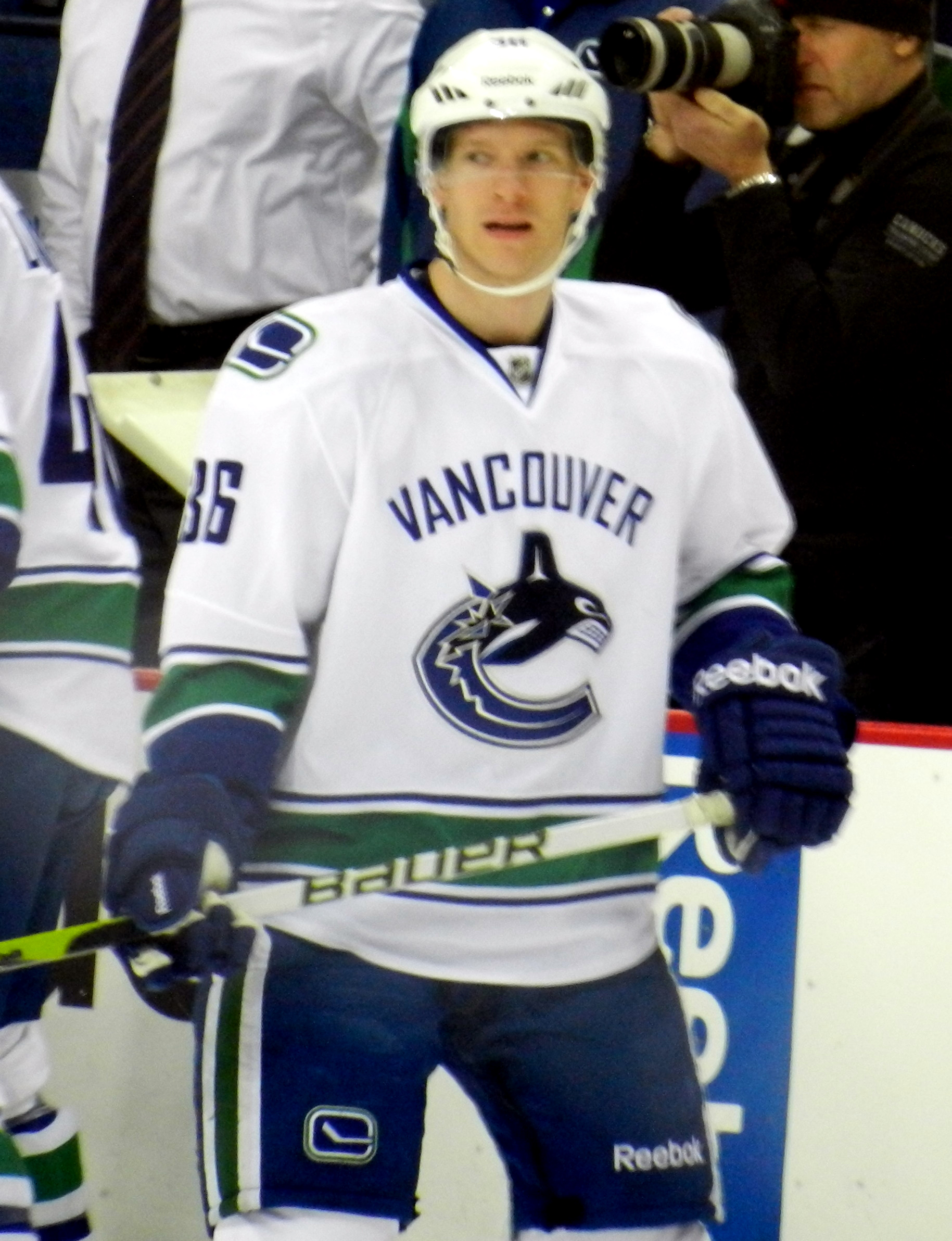
Jannik Hansen is the only three-time winner of the award (2011, 2013, 2016).

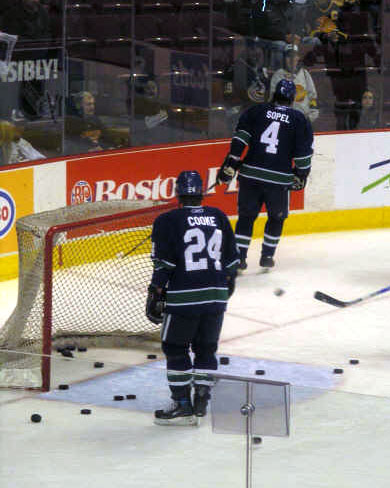
2003 recipient, Matt Cooke, and 2004 recipient, Brent Sopel

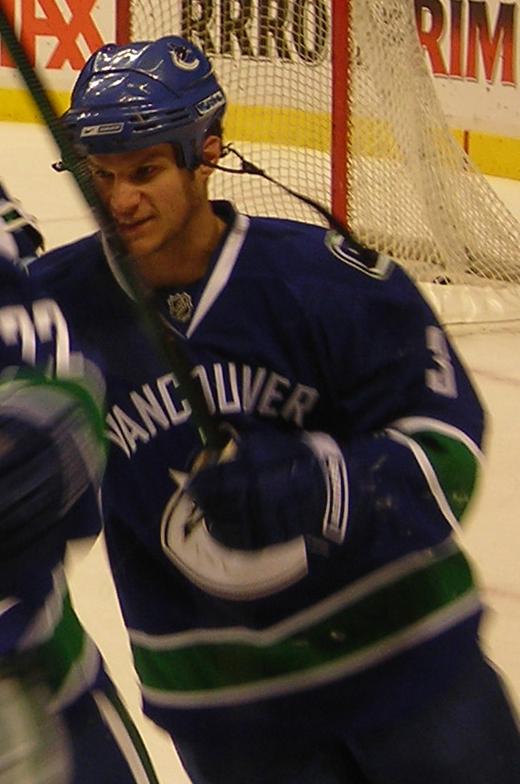
Kevin Bieksa won in 2007.

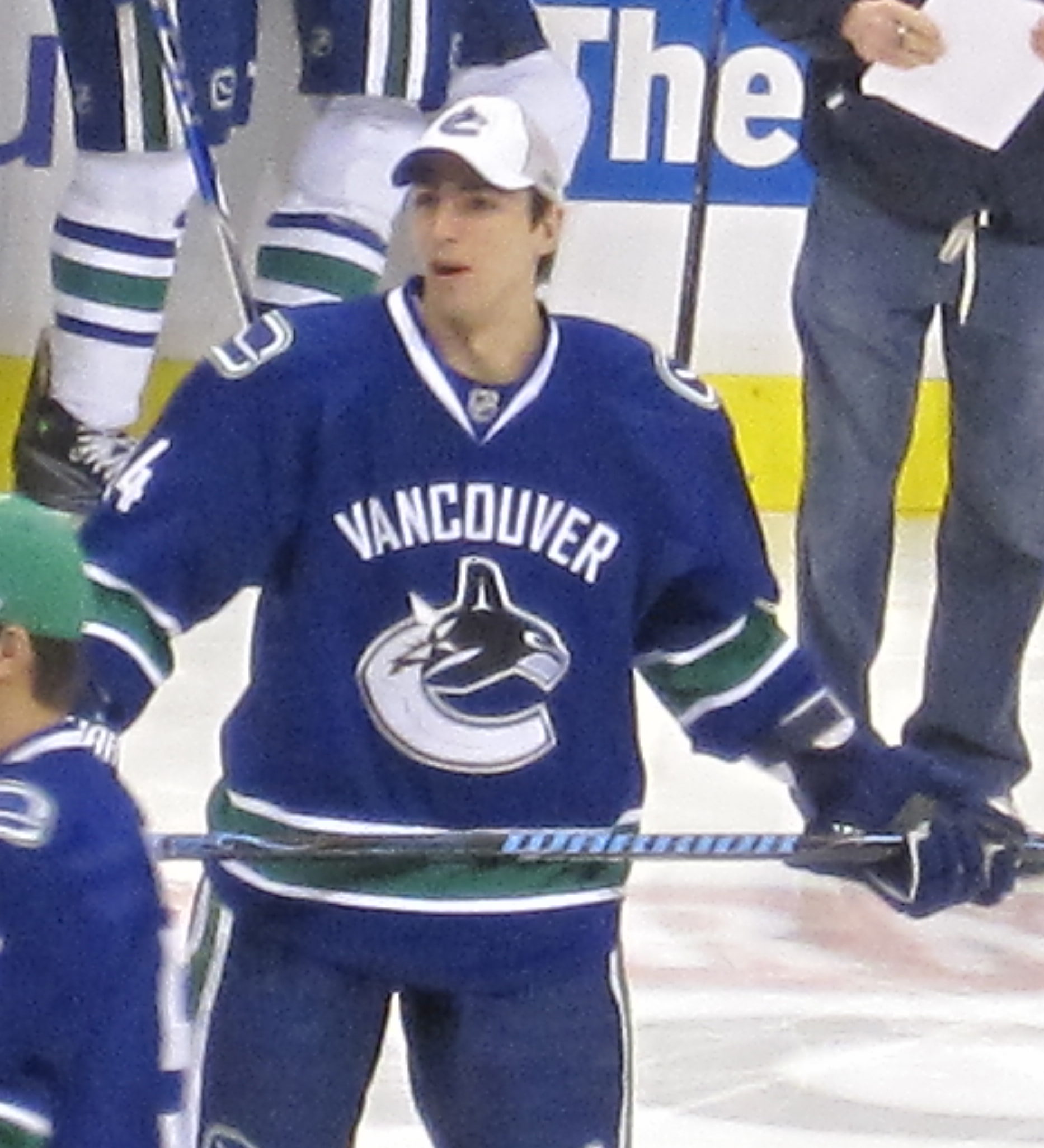
Alex Burrows won in 2008.

Positions key
C	Centre	LW	Left wing	D	Defence	RW	Right wing	G	Goaltender

Player is still active with the Canucks.

Season	Winner	Position
1970–71	Barry Wilkins	D
1971–72	Ron Ward	C
1972–73	Dennis Kearns	D
1973–74	Don Lever	LW
1974–75	Garry Monahan	C
1975–76	Mike Robitaille	D
1976–77	Hilliard Graves	RW
1977–78	Hilliard Graves (2)	RW
1978–79	Harold Snepsts	D
1979–80	Kevin McCarthy	D
1980–81	Per-Olov Brasar	LW
1981–82	Lars Lindgren	D
1982–83	Doug Halward	D
1983–84	Jiri Bubla	D
1984–85	Doug Lidster	D
1985–86	Brent Peterson	RW
1986–87	Garth Butcher	D
1987–88	Rich Sutter	RW
1988–89	Rich Sutter (2)	RW
1989–90	Steve Bozek	LW
1990–91	Steve Bozek (2)	LW
1991–92	Garry Valk	LW
1992–93	Cliff Ronning	C
1993–94	John McIntyre	C
1994–95	Martin Gélinas	LW
1995–96	Martin Gélinas (2)	LW
1996–97	Mike Sillinger	C
1997–98	Brian Noonan	RW
1998–99	Adrian Aucoin	D
1999–2000	Andrew Cassels	C
2000–01	Murray Baron	D
2001–02	Scott Lachance	D
2002–03	Matt Cooke	LW
2003–04	Brent Sopel	D
2004–05	Season cancelled due to the 2004–05 NHL lockout	
2005–06	Jarkko Ruutu	RW
2006–07	Kevin Bieksa	D
2007–08	Alexandre Burrows	LW
2008–09	Steve Bernier	RW
2009–10	Mason Raymond	LW
2010–11	Jannik Hansen	RW
2011–12	Chris Higgins	LW
2012–13	Jannik Hansen (2)	LW
2013–14	Eddie Lack	G
2014–15	Derek Dorsett	RW
2015–16	Jannik Hansen (3)	RW
2016–17	Markus Granlund	RW
2017–18	Derek Dorsett (2)	RW
2018–19	Antoine Roussel	LW
2019–20	J. T. Miller	LW
2020–21	Tyler Motte	LW
2021–22	Luke Schenn	D
2022–23	Dakota Joshua	C
2023–24	Dakota Joshua (2)	LW
2024–25	Kiefer Sherwood	LW
2025–26	Drew O'Connor	LW

== See also ==
- Babe Pratt Trophy
- Cyclone Taylor Trophy
- Cyrus H. McLean Trophy
- Molson Cup
- Pavel Bure Most Exciting Player Award
