= Matt Cooke =

Canadian ice hockey player (born 1978)

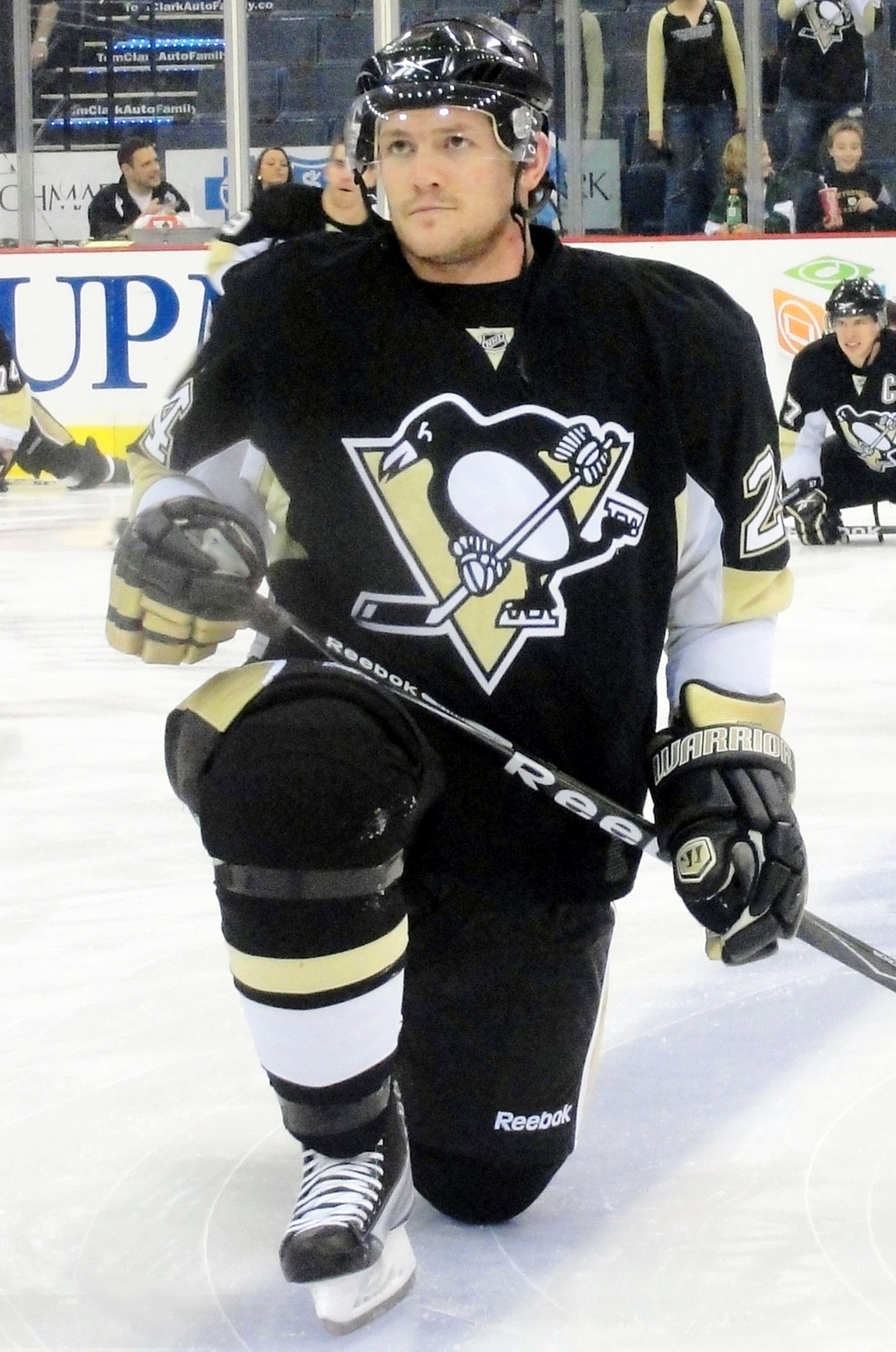
- Cooke with the Pittsburgh Penguins in April 2010
- Born: September 7, 1978 (age 48) Belleville, Ontario, Canada
- Height: 5 ft 11 in (180 cm)
- Weight: 208 lb (94 kg; 14 st 12 lb)
- Position: Left wing
- Played for: Vancouver Canucks; Washington Capitals; Pittsburgh Penguins; Minnesota Wild
- National team: Canada
- NHL draft: 144th overall, 1997; Vancouver Canucks
- Playing career: 1998–2015

Matthew David Cooke (born September 7, 1978) is a Canadian professional ice hockey coach and former professional player. He is the current head coach and general manager of the Vernon Vipers of the British Columbia Hockey League (BCHL). Cooke played sixteen seasons in the National Hockey League (NHL). Cooke won the Stanley Cup with the Pittsburgh Penguins in 2009 and was a member of the Team Canada team that won the gold medal at the 2004 World Championships. He also played for the Vancouver Canucks, Washington Capitals, and Minnesota Wild. Cooke was born in Belleville, Ontario, but grew up in Stirling, Ontario. He served as head coach of the Newfoundland Growlers for the 2023/24 season.

Cooke's playing style earned him the reputation as one of the NHL's "pests". During his NHL career, Cooke was criticized and often suspended for hits, some involving head-shots, or knee-on-knee collisions that have injured opposing players. Most notable was a hit to the head of Marc Savard of the Boston Bruins in March 2010, which was an important factor influencing NHL rule changes intended to deter such conduct. After his longest suspension in March 2011 for a hit to the head of Ryan McDonagh of the New York Rangers, Cooke pledged to change his style of play, although he had another lengthy suspension in April 2014 during the first round of the 2014 playoffs for a knee-on-knee hit delivered to Tyson Barrie of the Colorado Avalanche.

== Playing career ==
As a youth, Cooke played in the 1992 Quebec International Pee-Wee Hockey Tournament with the Quinte minor ice hockey team from Belleville, Ontario.

Cooke played junior ice hockey in the Ontario Hockey League (OHL) for three seasons, predominantly with the Windsor Spitfires, prior to playing professionally. Recording an impressive 95-point (tenth overall in the league), 146-penalty-minute campaign in his second OHL season, he was drafted 144th overall by the Vancouver Canucks in the 1997 NHL entry draft. Returning to the OHL for a third season after being drafted, he was traded from Windsor to the Kingston Frontenacs on December 17, 1997, in exchange for Brent L'Heureux. Cooke would finish the season and his OHL career with Kingston.

=== Vancouver Canucks ===
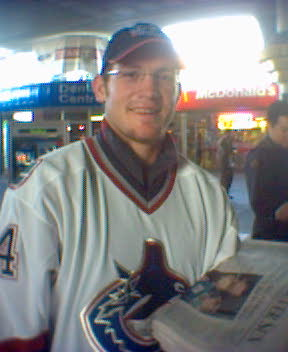
Matt Cooke in 2006

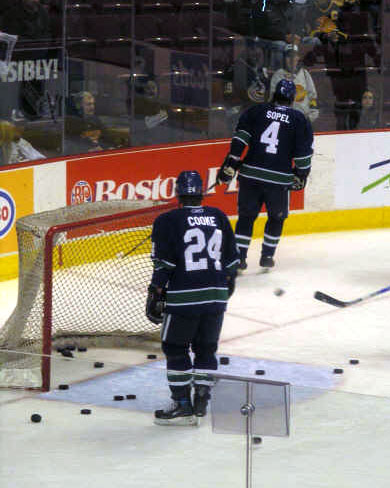
Cooke with the Vancouver Canucks in 2007.

Splitting the 1998–99 and 1999–2000 seasons between the Canucks and their American Hockey League (AHL) affiliate, the Syracuse Crunch, Cooke would play for the Canucks full-time in 2000–01.

Typically playing in the role of a checking winger, Cooke recorded a career-high 42 points in 2002–03 and earned the Fred J. Hume Award as the team's unsung hero. Continuing to show offensive capabilities, after returning from an injury in 2003–04, he was promoted to the Canucks' top line towards the end of the season. On account of Todd Bertuzzi's infamous suspension, Cooke joined Markus Näslund and Brendan Morrison on the Canucks' top line for the final 13 games of the season and the playoffs.

Perhaps Cooke's most memorable moment with the Canucks occurred during this stint on the first line as the Canucks entered the 2004 playoffs against the Calgary Flames. With the Canucks down by a goal in the final minute of the series-deciding seventh game, Cooke drove the net on a Markus Näslund rush and dramatically tied the score with five seconds remaining in regulation; it was also Cooke's second goal of the game. As the Canucks were short-handed at the time, however, Calgary began the overtime period on the powerplay and clinched the series.

After a year of inactivity on account of the 2004–05 NHL lockout, Cooke would play two more full seasons with the Canucks, scoring at a similar pace. With Cooke's contract set to expire at the end of the 2007–08 season, he was sent to the Washington Capitals in exchange for Matt Pettinger at the trade deadline. The trade ended Cooke's tenure with the Canucks in his ninth season with the club. At the time of the trade, he was 12th all-time in games played as a Canuck with 556.

=== Washington Capitals and Pittsburgh Penguins ===
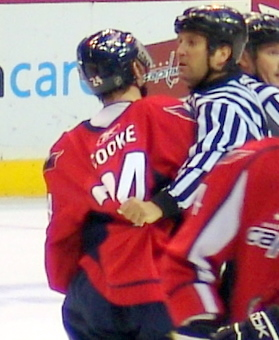
Cooke with the Capitals, March 2008.

Finishing the 2007–08 season, Cooke would play 17 games with the Capitals, scoring seven points. In the off-season, on July 5, 2008, Cooke signed a two-year, $2.4-million contract with the Pittsburgh Penguins. He injured his ribs in his first season with the Penguins in October, missing four games, but was able to return by the end of the month. On December 2, 2008, he was named to the rotating position of alternate captain for the Penguins for the month of December. The next month, Cooke was suspended for two games on January 27, 2009, for a headshot that he delivered to Carolina Hurricanes forward Scott Walker seven days earlier. He was assessed a minor penalty for interference on the play. He earned the Stanley Cup with Pittsburgh in 2009.

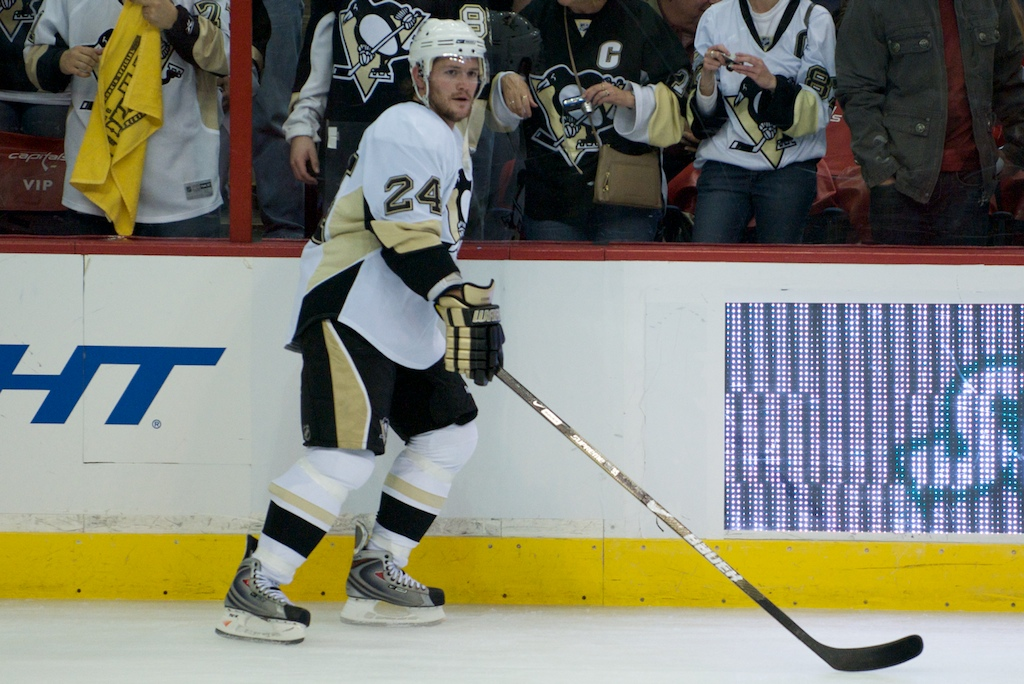
Cooke with the Penguins

Cooke set a new career high during the 2010 Stanley Cup Playoffs by scoring four post-season goals, two of those coming in the decisive Game 6 against the Ottawa Senators at Scotiabank Place. On June 22, 2010, Cooke signed a three-year contract to stay with the Penguins, a deal worth $1.8 million per season.

=== Minnesota Wild ===
Following his contract expiry with the Pittsburgh Penguins, on July 5, 2013, Cooke signed a three-year, $7.5 million contract with the Minnesota Wild. It marked Cooke's return to the Western Conference after leaving the Vancouver Canucks during the 2007–08 season. Playing in all 82 games in the 2013-14 NHL Season, Cooke scored 10 goals along with 18 assists for 28 points in his first season with the Wild.

With Minnesota up against the Salary cap and suffering an injury plagued 2014–15 season, having appeared in just 29 regular season games, Cooke was placed on waivers in order to buy-out the final year of his three-year contract with the Wild on June 19, 2015.

== Criticism and suspensions ==
During his career, Cooke has been criticized by the media, league, fans, and team executives, and other players for his hitting in ways more likely to cause injury, such as hits to the head or hits to an opponent's knee. Of note, former CBC host and head coach Don Cherry has been consistently and effectively critical of Cooke, personally, and has faulted the NHL for not responding appropriately to Cooke's intents to render opposing players unable to play over the years.

In the 2008–09 season, with the Penguins, Cooke was suspended on two different occasions. In November, he received a two-game suspension for a check to the head of the New York Rangers' Artem Anisimov. In January 2009, he received another two-game suspension for a hit to the head of Scott Walker of the Carolina Hurricanes.

On March 7, 2010, in a game against the Boston Bruins, Cooke delivered a blow to the head of Boston's Marc Savard, concussing Savard and forcing him to miss almost two months. Cooke said he was not intending to hurt Savard; Bruins General Manager Peter Chiarelli, however, characterized the hit as "a very surgical hit to the head." Fellow Penguin teammate Bill Guerin also analyzed Cooke's hit on Savard to Pittsburgh reporters. "If a guy gets hurt like that with a shot to the head, there's got to be something," said Guerin, adding that he expected Cooke to be suspended. "I understand he (Cooke) is on my team but, hey, he's in a tough spot." In a ruling, which has received wide criticism, Cooke was not given a suspension for the hit on Savard. On March 24, in response to the outcry over Cooke not being suspended, the league implemented a new rule aimed at prohibiting blindside hits to the head like the one Cooke delivered to Savard. In announcing the rule, NHL Commissioner Gary Bettman said, "The elimination of these types of hits should significantly reduce the number of injuries, including concussions, without adversely affecting the level of physicality in the game." Earlier, Bettman appeared on Leafs Lunch on Mojo 640 in Toronto to discuss the Cooke hit on Savard. "I was very unhappy and upset with that hit," said Bettman. "I was more upset there was nothing (in the League rules) to do to punish it."

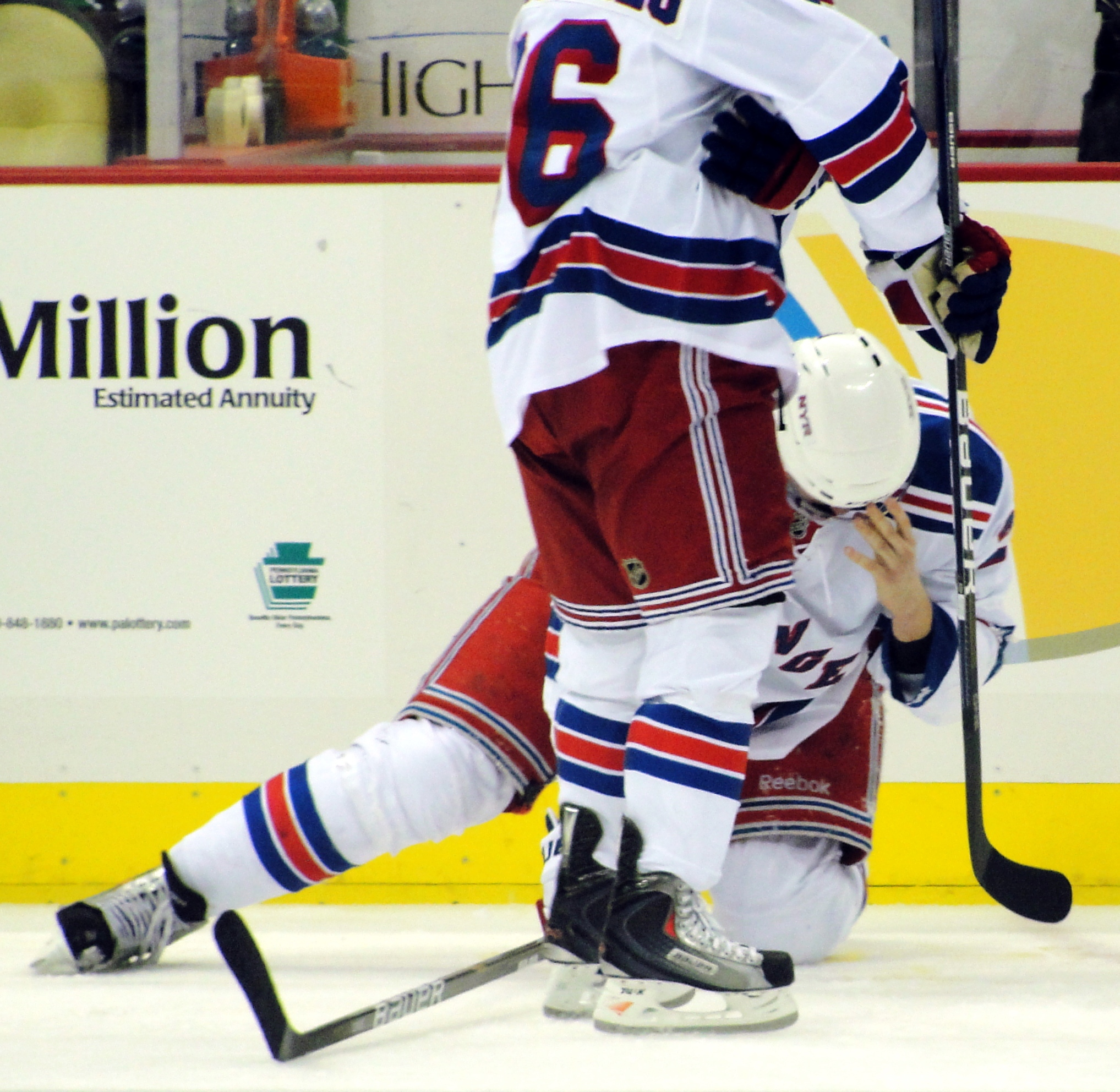
Rangers Ryan McDonagh is slow to get up after the elbow delivered by Cooke.

On February 9, 2011, Cooke was given a four-game suspension for a hit from behind on Columbus Blue Jackets' defenceman Fedor Tyutin. On March 21, Cooke was suspended for the final ten games of the Penguins' regular season schedule, as well as the first round of the 2011 Stanley Cup playoffs, stemming from an elbow to the head of New York Rangers defenceman Ryan McDonagh. The suspension was the longest of Cooke's career and was supported by the Penguins. Penguins General Manager Ray Shero said in a statement that the hit was "exactly the kind of hit we're trying to get out of the game," and that Penguins officials had told Cooke "in no uncertain terms" that such play was "unacceptable." Speaking to two Pittsburgh newspapers the day after the incident, Cooke apologized for the hit. "I realize and understand, more so now than ever, that I need to change," Cooke said.

=== "Changing" his game ===
With the suspension and then Pittsburgh's early elimination from the playoffs, Cooke had a considerable amount of free time. He spent much of the time with Penguins head coach Dan Bylsma reviewing each of his hits to learn how to change his game to hit within the rules. Cooke said, "The way I played before was to get the biggest hit possible every time no matter what," and that now in "certain situations, I just approach differently. I try to get the puck more than I did before." Well into the 2011–12 season, teammate Craig Adams said of Cooke's play, "I've noticed over the last month or so, he's been feeling more comfortable being physical again, obviously, within the rules. That was a big part of his game." At season's end, he had scored a career-high 19 goals and posted only 44 penalty minutes, his lowest career total in a full NHL season.

In February 2013, Cooke was involved in an incident with the Ottawa Senators in which Erik Karlsson's achilles tendon was cut by Cooke's skate as the two made contact along the boards. While Senators owner Eugene Melnyk was outraged by the incident, stating, "To have him (Karlsson) taken out by a goon is unconscionable," league officials determined there would be no supplemental discipline for Cooke.

On April 21, 2014, during Game 3 of the first round of the 2014 playoffs against the Colorado Avalanche, Cooke, playing for the Minnesota Wild, delivered a knee-on-knee check to Avalanche defenceman Tyson Barrie. Barrie did not return to the game and it was announced that he would miss four-to-six weeks as a result of the Cooke check. After an in-person hearing with the Department of Player Safety, Cooke was suspended for seven games for his conduct. As per the stipulations governing suspensions during the playoffs, Cooke did not suffer any loss of income.

== Coaching career ==
On October 7, 2023, Cooke was hired as the head coach of the Newfoundland Growlers in the ECHL. He remained in that position until the Growlers organization were forced to cease operations on April 2, 2024.

On July 18, 2025 it was announced that Cooke would join the Vernon Vipers of the BCHL as the Head Coach and General Manager.

== International play ==
Medal record

Representing Canada

Ice hockey

World Championships
Gold medal – first place	2004 Czech Republic	

Cooke made his first international appearance, playing for the Canadian national junior team at the 1998 World Junior Championships. He scored two points in six games, but could not help Canada win a medal, as Canada lost to Russia in the quarter-finals, then to the US and Kazakhstan, finishing eighth overall behind Kazakhstan. He then competed for Team Canada at the 2004 World Championships. Named to the team with Vancouver Canucks teammate Brendan Morrison, Cooke helped Canada clinch gold, tallying four points in nine games.

== Personal life ==
Cooke and his wife Michelle, whom he married in 2001, have three children; a daughter, a son, and a stepdaughter. Cooke and Michelle ran a foundation called The Cooke Family Foundation of Hope, based out of Vancouver. It was dissolved in 2016. The couple separated in 2024 and officially divorced in October 2025.

== Awards ==
- Fred J. Hume Award (Vancouver Canucks' unsung hero) – 2003
- Gold medal (Team Canada) – 2004 World Championships
- Stanley Cup – 2009

== Career statistics ==
=== Regular season and playoffs ===
			Regular season					Playoffs
Season	Team	League	GP	G	A	Pts	PIM	GP	G	A	Pts	PIM
1994–95	Wellington Dukes	MetJHL	46	9	23	32	62	—	—	—	—	—
1995–96	Windsor Spitfires	OHL	61	8	11	19	102	7	1	3	4	6
1996–97	Windsor Spitfires	OHL	65	45	50	95	146	5	5	5	10	10
1997–98	Windsor Spitfires	OHL	23	14	19	33	50	—	—	—	—	—
1997–98	Kingston Frontenacs	OHL	25	8	13	21	49	12	8	8	16	20
1998–99	Vancouver Canucks	NHL	30	0	2	2	27	—	—	—	—	—
1998–99	Syracuse Crunch	AHL	37	15	18	33	119	—	—	—	—	—
1999–2000	Vancouver Canucks	NHL	51	5	7	12	39	—	—	—	—	—
1999–2000	Syracuse Crunch	AHL	18	5	8	13	27	—	—	—	—	—
2000–01	Vancouver Canucks	NHL	81	14	13	27	94	4	0	0	0	4
2001–02	Vancouver Canucks	NHL	82	13	20	33	111	6	3	2	5	0
2002–03	Vancouver Canucks	NHL	82	15	27	42	82	14	2	1	3	12
2003–04	Vancouver Canucks	NHL	53	11	12	23	73	7	3	1	4	12
2005–06	Vancouver Canucks	NHL	45	8	10	18	71	—	—	—	—	—
2006–07	Vancouver Canucks	NHL	81	10	20	30	64	1	0	0	0	2
2007–08	Vancouver Canucks	NHL	61	7	9	16	64	—	—	—	—	—
2007–08	Washington Capitals	NHL	17	3	4	7	27	7	0	0	0	4
2008–09	Pittsburgh Penguins	NHL	76	13	18	31	101	24	1	6	7	22
2009–10	Pittsburgh Penguins	NHL	79	15	15	30	106	13	4	2	6	22
2010–11	Pittsburgh Penguins	NHL	67	12	18	30	129	—	—	—	—	—
2011–12	Pittsburgh Penguins	NHL	82	19	19	38	44	6	0	4	4	16
2012–13	Pittsburgh Penguins	NHL	48	8	13	21	36	15	0	4	4	35
2013–14	Minnesota Wild	NHL	82	10	18	28	54	6	0	3	3	8
2014–15	Minnesota Wild	NHL	29	4	6	10	13	7	0	2	2	4
NHL totals			1,046	167	231	398	1,135	110	13	25	38	141

=== International ===
Year	Team	Event	Result	GP	G	A	Pts	PIM
1998	Canada	WJC	8th	6	1	1	2	6
2004	Canada	WC	1st place, gold medalist(s)	9	2	2	4	8
Junior totals				6	1	1	2	6
Senior totals				9	2	2	4	8
