= Linden Vey =

Canadian ice hockey player (born 1991)

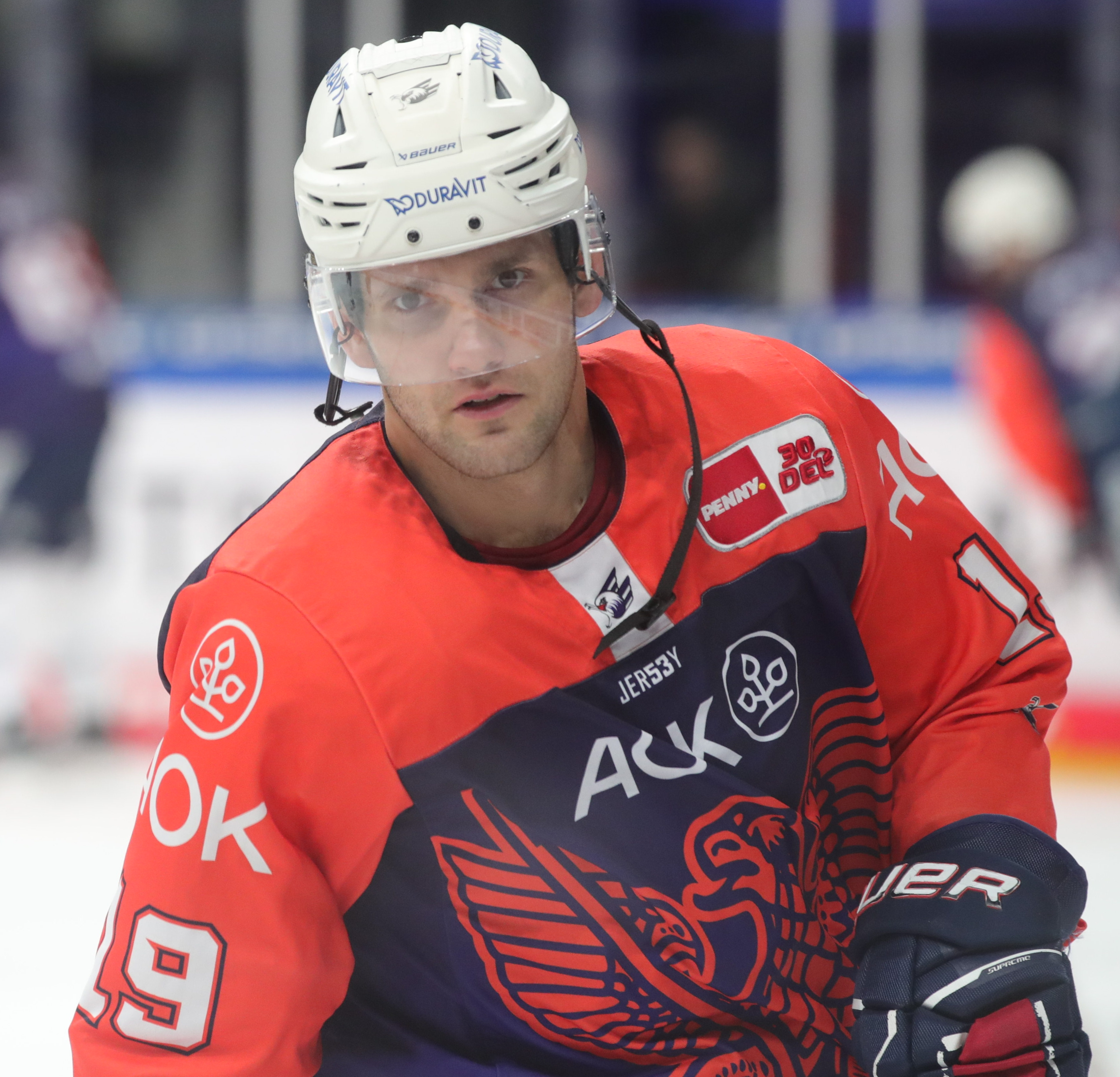
- Vey in December 2023
- Born: July 17, 1991 (age 35) Wakaw, Saskatchewan, Canada
- Height: 6 ft 0 in (183 cm)
- Weight: 200 lb (91 kg; 14 st 4 lb)
- Position: Right wing/Centre
- Shoots: Right
- ICE team Former teams: Vienna Capitals; Los Angeles Kings; Vancouver Canucks; Calgary Flames; Barys Astana; ZSC Lions; CSKA Moscow; SKA Saint Petersburg
- National team: Canada
- NHL draft: 96th overall, 2009; Los Angeles Kings
- Playing career: 2011–present

Linden Vey (born July 17, 1991) is a Canadian professional ice hockey right winger currently playing for Adler Mannheim of the Deutsche Eishockey Liga (DEL). Vey previously played in the National Hockey League (NHL) for the Calgary Flames, Vancouver Canucks and the Los Angeles Kings, the latter of which drafted him in the fourth round, 96th overall, in the 2009 NHL entry draft.

== Playing career ==
On June 28, 2014, Vey was traded by the Los Angeles Kings to the Vancouver Canucks in exchange for a second-round pick at the 2014 NHL entry draft (ultimately used to select Roland McKeown). He scored his first NHL goal on October 11, 2014, against Viktor Fasth of the Edmonton Oilers. On October 5, 2015, Vey was placed on waivers by the Canucks. He cleared waivers the following day and was assigned to the Utica Comets of the American Hockey League (AHL).

On July 5, 2016, Vey signed a one-year, two-way deal as a free agent with the Calgary Flames. Vey was assigned to Calgary's AHL affiliate, the Stockton Heat, to begin the 2016–17 season. As the team's top scorer, he scored 55 points in 61 games but was limited to just four scoreless games in his recall to the Flames.

On July 2, 2017, Vey signed a contract abroad, agreeing to a one-year deal with Kazakh-based club Barys Astana of the Kontinental Hockey League (KHL). Despite scoring 52 points in 50 games, Barys Astana missed the playoffs. As a result, Vey was granted his release and signed with ZSC Lions of the Swiss National League (NL) on January 18, 2018. He played out the remainder of the season with the Lions, helping retain the Swiss championship.

On May 3, 2018, Vey opted to return to the KHL, signing a two-year contract as a free agent with CSKA Moscow. In his first season with CSKA, Vey contributed with 31 assists and 43 points in 56 regular season games. He compiled 10 points in 18 playoff games to help CSKA claim the Gagarin Cup.

At the conclusion of his contract with CSKA, Vey signed as a free agent to a two-year contract with SKA Saint Petersburg, on May 16, 2020.

On May 5, 2023, Vey left Astana and the KHL at the conclusion of his contract and signed a one-year contract with German club, Adler Mannheim of the DEL.

== International play ==
Medal record

Representing Canada

Ice hockey

Olympic Games
Bronze medal – third place	2018 Pyeongchang	

World U-17 Hockey Challenge
Bronze medal – third place	2008 Canada	

During the 2017–18 season, Vey was selected to represent Canada at the 2018 Winter Olympics in Pyeongchang, South Korea. Used in a depth role, Vey contributed with one assist in six games to help Canada claim the bronze medal.

== Personal life ==
On June 5, 2016, Vey's father, Curtis and his mistress, Angela Nicholson, were convicted of conspiracy to commit murder. The targets of the plot were Vey's mother, Brigitte, as well as Nicholson's husband. They were acquitted after a retrial in May 2019.

== Career statistics ==
=== Regular season and playoffs ===
			Regular season					Playoffs
Season	Team	League	GP	G	A	Pts	PIM	GP	G	A	Pts	PIM
2006–07	Beardy's Blackhawks AAA	SMHL	44	28	44	72	26	—	—	—	—	—
2006–07	Medicine Hat Tigers	WHL	2	0	0	0	2	—	—	—	—	—
2007–08	Medicine Hat Tigers	WHL	48	8	9	17	21	5	0	1	1	2
2008–09	Medicine Hat Tigers	WHL	71	24	48	72	20	11	2	5	7	2
2009–10	Medicine Hat Tigers	WHL	72	24	51	75	34	12	2	6	8	8
2010–11	Medicine Hat Tigers	WHL	69	46	70	116	36	15	12	13	25	8
2011–12	Manchester Monarchs	AHL	74	19	24	43	16	4	2	4	6	0
2012–13	Manchester Monarchs	AHL	74	22	45	67	32	4	2	0	2	4
2013–14	Manchester Monarchs	AHL	43	14	34	48	20	4	0	2	2	4
2013–14	Los Angeles Kings	NHL	18	0	5	5	0	—	—	—	—	—
2014–15	Vancouver Canucks	NHL	75	10	14	24	18	1	0	0	0	0
2015–16	Utica Comets	AHL	26	3	12	15	8	—	—	—	—	—
2015–16	Vancouver Canucks	NHL	41	4	11	15	6	—	—	—	—	—
2016–17	Stockton Heat	AHL	61	15	40	55	40	5	4	1	5	2
2016–17	Calgary Flames	NHL	4	0	0	0	0	—	—	—	—	—
2017–18	Barys Astana	KHL	50	17	35	52	64	—	—	—	—	—
2017–18	ZSC Lions	NL	10	2	4	6	8	5	0	2	2	4
2018–19	CSKA Moscow	KHL	56	12	31	43	22	18	3	7	10	8
2019–20	CSKA Moscow	KHL	52	13	35	48	47	4	1	1	2	2
2020–21	SKA Saint Petersburg	KHL	41	4	21	25	12	16	2	3	5	8
2021–22	SKA Saint Petersburg	KHL	21	5	6	11	14	—	—	—	—	—
2021–22	Barys Nur–Sultan	KHL	20	6	6	12	14	5	0	3	3	4
2022–23	Barys Astana	KHL	57	18	23	41	38	—	—	—	—	—
2023–24	Adler Mannheim	DEL	38	8	31	39	16	7	0	7	7	6
NHL totals			138	14	30	44	24	1	0	0	0	0
KHL totals			297	75	157	232	211	43	6	14	20	22

=== International ===
Year	Team	Event	Result	GP	G	A	Pts	PIM
2008	Canada Western	U17	3rd place, bronze medalist(s)	6	0	3	3	0
2018	Canada	OG	3rd place, bronze medalist(s)	6	0	1	1	2
Junior totals				6	0	3	3	0
Senior totals				6	0	1	1	2

== Awards and honours ==
Award	Year
WHL
East First All-Star Team	2011
Bob Clarke Trophy	2011
CHL Top Scorer	2011
AHL
Rookie of the Month (February)	2012
KHL
All-Star Game	2018
Gagarin Cup (CSKA Moscow)	2019
