= Jacob Markström =

Swedish ice hockey player (born 1990)

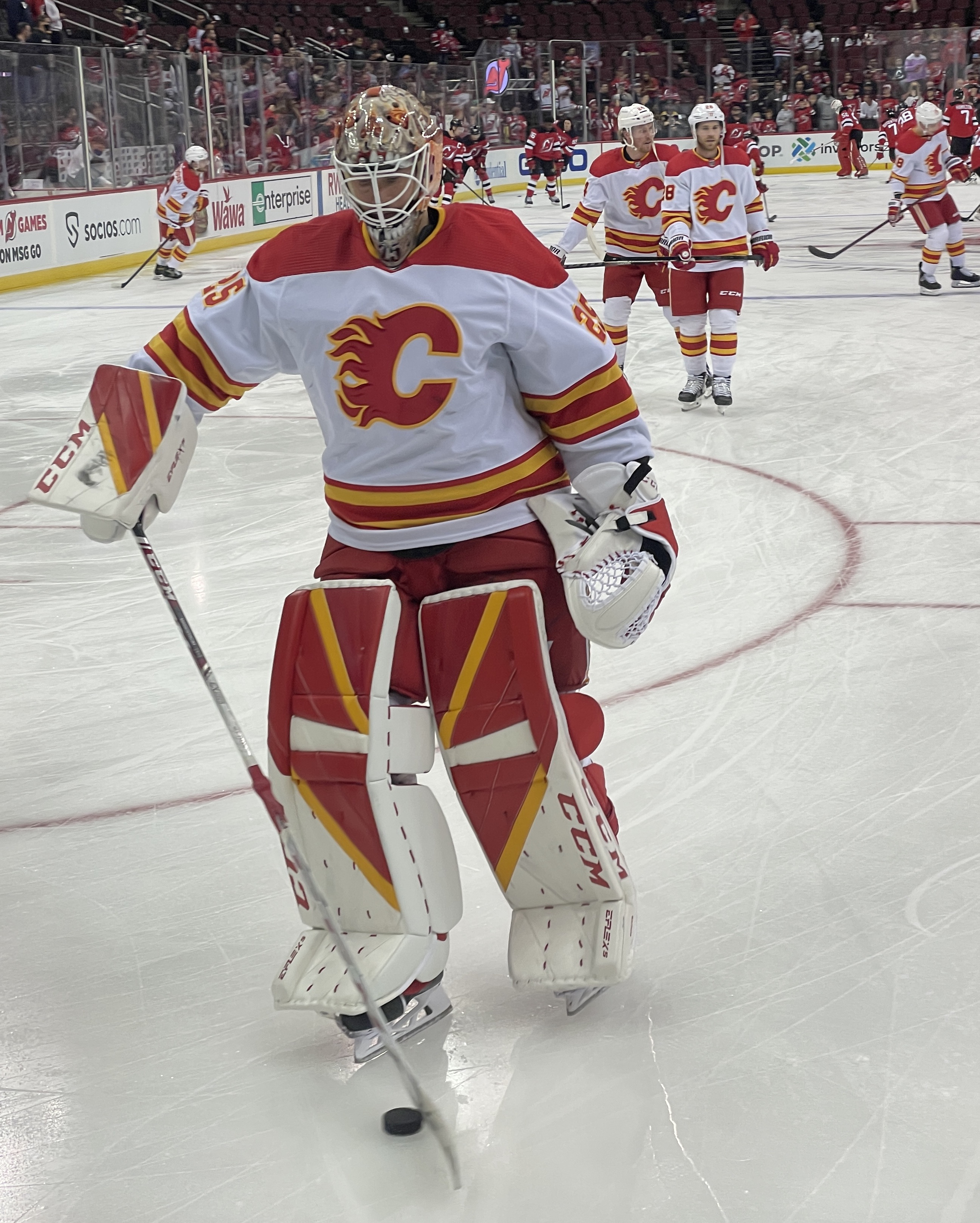
- Markström with the Calgary Flames in 2021
- Born: 31 January 1990 (age 36) Gävle, Sweden
- Height: 6 ft 6 in (198 cm)
- Weight: 196 lb (89 kg; 14 st 0 lb)
- Position: Goaltender
- Catches: Left
- NHL team Former teams: Florida Panthers; Brynäs IF; Vancouver Canucks; Calgary Flames; New Jersey Devils
- National team: Sweden
- NHL draft: 31st overall, 2008; Florida Panthers
- Playing career: 2008–present

Jacob Anders Markström (born 31 January 1990) is a Swedish professional ice hockey player who is a goaltender for the Florida Panthers of the National Hockey League (NHL). He was selected by the Panthers in the second round, 31st overall, of the 2008 NHL entry draft, and subsequently played for the Vancouver Canucks, Calgary Flames, and New Jersey Devils before returning to Florida.

== Playing career ==
=== Brynäs IF ===
Markström signed a two-year contract with the Brynäs IF senior team on 12 May 2008. He had previously been playing for the Brynäs IF junior team. The following month, after solid performances in the Elitserien (SEL) and internationally for Sweden national teams in the under-18 and junior tournaments, the butterfly style goaltender was selected 31st overall in the 2008 NHL entry draft as the first choice of the Florida Panthers.

In 2009–10, Markström led the Elitserien in the save percentage (SVS%) and goals against average (GAA) statistics, with 92.72% and 2.01 respectively. On 1 June 2010, it was announced that the Panthers and Markström had agreed to terms on an entry-level contract.

=== Florida Panthers ===
On 23 January 2011, Markström made his NHL debut in the 5–2 loss to the New Jersey Devils, when he replaced starter Scott Clemmensen at the start of the second period. Upon his debut, he became the youngest goaltender to ever play for the Panthers.

Markström was then sent back to Florida's American Hockey League (AHL) affiliate team, the Rochester Americans. The team directives argued that Markström needed to get used to playing style in North America since players had different shooting tendencies. He struggled during his first season in the AHL and also injured his knee. After surgery Markström worked to get back in the game, hoping to have a real shot at the NHL level.

With Tomáš Vokoun departing via free agency to the Washington Capitals, Markström attended Florida's 2011 training camp to compete for a starting or backup position with fellow goaltenders José Théodore and Scott Clemmensen, ultimately being awarded the backup role when Clemmensen was injured. On 22 October, Markström earned his first NHL win when he played in the third period against the New York Islanders and made 18 saves on 18 shots.

Markström started the lockout-shortened 2012–13 season in the AHL, but with the starter Théodore suffering an injury on 2 March 2013, that forced him to miss the rest of the season, Markström was given the full-time role, starting most of their games during the remainder of the season.

=== Vancouver Canucks ===
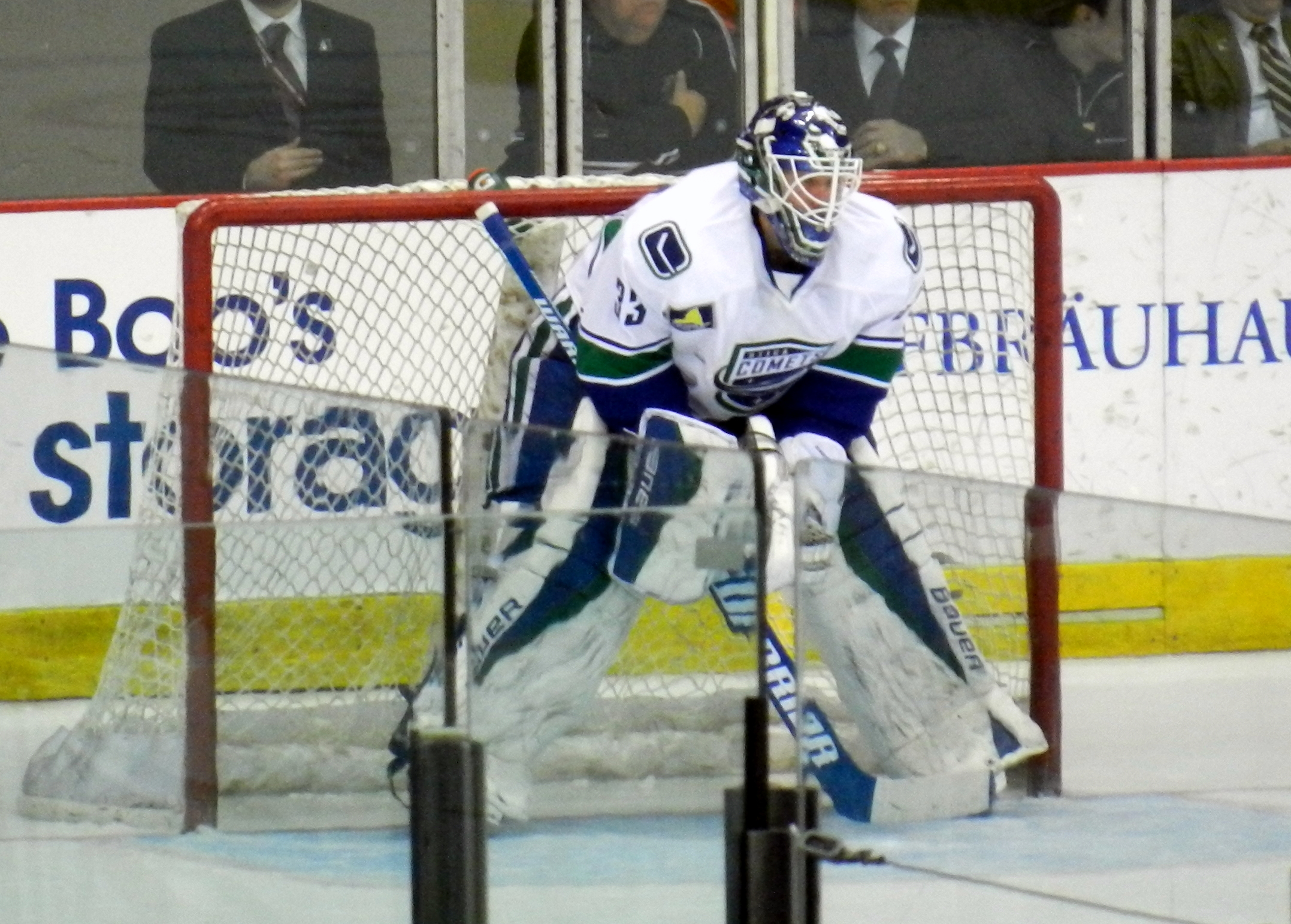
Markström with the Utica Comets in 2015.

It was believed that Markström would become the full-time starter for the Panthers at the beginning of the 2013–14 season, as Théodore was not retained and Markström signed a two-year contract extension. However, the Panthers would sign Tim Thomas to a one-year contract, and Markström was subsequently demoted to the AHL again. On 4 March 2014, he was traded by the Panthers, along with Shawn Matthias, to the Vancouver Canucks in exchange for Roberto Luongo and Steven Anthony, where he served as Vancouver's backup behind fellow Swede Eddie Läck.

Markström failed to make the Canucks out of training camp during the 2014–15 season. After clearing waivers, he was assigned to the Canucks' AHL affiliate, the Utica Comets. Following an injury to Ryan Miller, Markström was recalled to the Canucks to serve as backup to Läck and got to play on 3 March 2015, against the San Jose Sharks, but was pulled after he allowed three goals on four shots. The Canucks went on to lose the game 6–2. Markström came into a game on 19 March, against the Columbus Blue Jackets and made two saves on two shots. However, the Canucks went on to lose that game 6–2 as well. Markström got his first and only win of the 2014–15 season when he made 26 saves on 27 shots on 22 March, when the Canucks beat the Arizona Coyotes 3–1.

On 29 June 2015, Markström was re-signed to a two-year, one-way contract with the Canucks.

On 7 July 2016, Markström signed a three-year contract extension with the Canucks.

On 5 December 2017, Markström recorded his first NHL shutout, in a 3–0 Canucks victory over the Carolina Hurricanes.

On 12 December 2019, Markström recorded his fourth NHL shutout, stopping 43 shots on goal in a 1–0 Canucks victory over the Hurricanes, giving him a second-place franchise record for most shots stopped in a regular season game (tied with former Canucks goaltender Cory Schneider). On 3 January 2020, Markström was named to his first NHL All-Star Game, when he was announced as replacement for Marc-André Fleury of the Vegas Golden Knights.

=== Calgary Flames ===
On 9 October 2020, Markström left the Canucks as a free agent and signed a six-year, $36 million contract with the Calgary Flames. He finished with a record of 22–19–2 in 43 games in the pandemic-shortened 2020–21 season, having struggled with a concussion midway through following a collision with Canucks' teammate Tanner Pearson, which was initially undiagnosed. The Flames narrowly failed to qualify for the 2021 Stanley Cup playoffs, finishing narrowly behind the Montreal Canadiens for the final berth in the all-Canadian North Division.

For the 2021–22 season, the NHL returned to its standard alignment, with the Flames again competing in the Pacific Division. Following a disappointing prior season that had seen a mid-season coaching replacement, new coach Darryl Sutter spurred the team to one of its best in years. Markström had the best season of his career to date, managing a 37–15–9 record with a .922 save percentage and a league-leading nine shutouts. He was named a finalist for the Vezina Trophy, awarded to the league's best goaltender. The Flames won the Pacific Division, and advanced to the 2022 Stanley Cup playoffs where they met the Dallas Stars in the first round. The series against the Stars became a goaltending duel between Markström and Stars netminder Jake Oettinger, with the latter recording the highest save percentage of the first round, while Markström had the second-highest, and was "instrumental" to the Flames' eventual victory in seven games. The team faced the Edmonton Oilers in the second round, the first "Battle of Alberta" playoff series in 31 years. The match bore special significance for Markström, who had declined to sign with the Oilers in 2020, but he performed poorly in the series, recording a .852 save percentage in a five-game series loss.

=== New Jersey Devils ===
On 19 June 2024, Markström was traded to the New Jersey Devils for Kevin Bahl and a 2025 first-round draft pick. Calgary retained 31.25% of his salary, making his cap hit $4.125 million for the Devils. On 21 November, Markström made 20 saves in his 500th NHL game as the Devils defeated the Hurricanes 4–2.

During a 31 March 2026 game against the New York Rangers, Markström fought Rangers' goaltender Igor Shesterkin. It was the third goaltender fight of the 2025–26 season.

=== Return to Florida ===
On 30 June 2026, Markström was traded once again to the Florida Panthers, alongside Angus Crookshank, for Jesper Boqvist, Evan Rodrigues, and Ben Steeves.

== International play ==
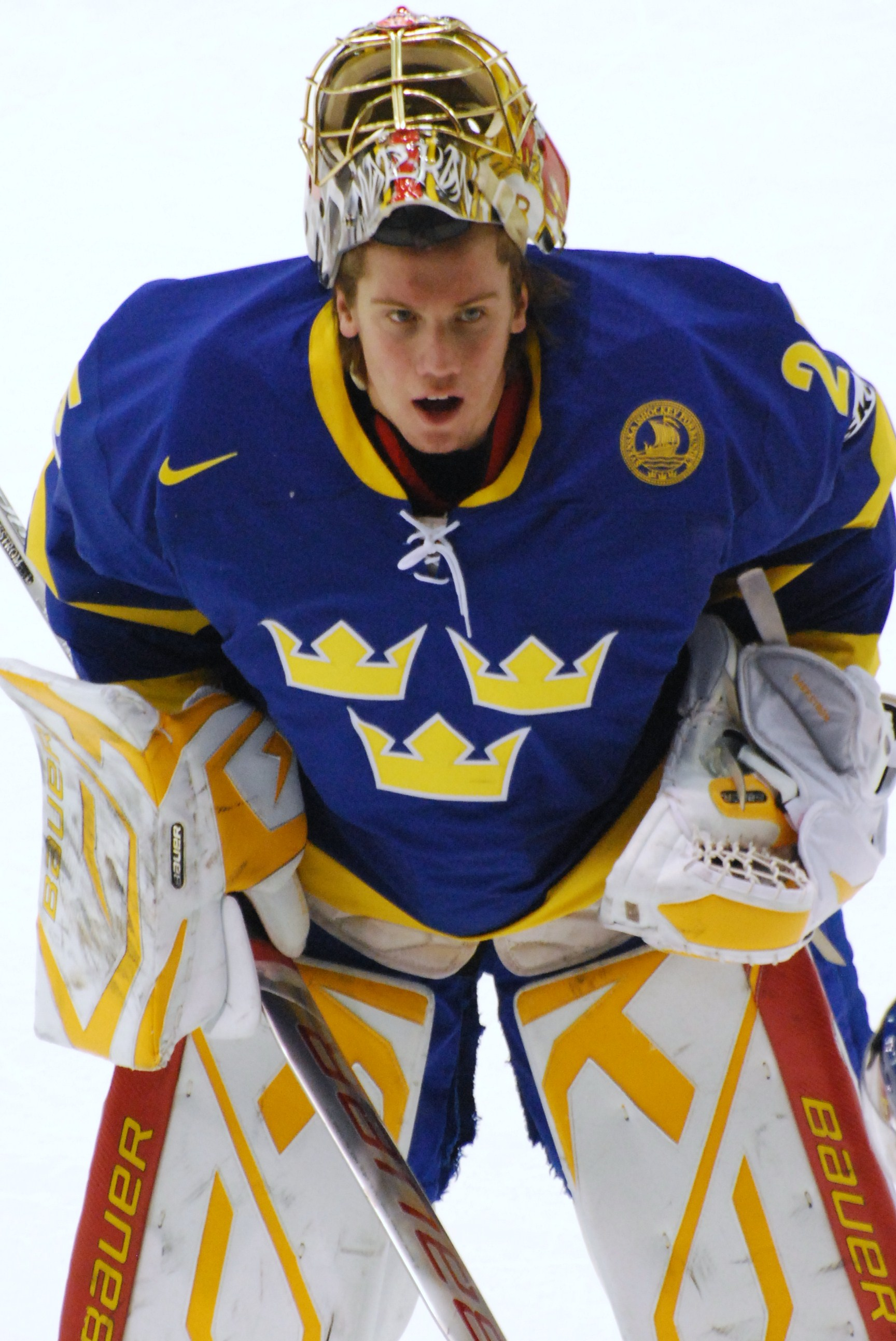
- Markström with Sweden at the 2010 World Junior Championships

Medal record

Men's ice hockey

Representing Sweden

World Championships
Gold medal – first place	2013 Sweden/Finland	
Bronze medal – third place	2010 Germany	
Bronze medal – third place	2025 Sweden/Denmark	

World Junior Championships
Silver medal – second place	2009 Ottawa	
Bronze medal – third place	2010 Saskatoon	

Markström has represented Sweden three times in junior tournaments. He backstopped the Sweden under-18 team to a fourth-place finish in the 2008 World U18 Championships. The next year, he played for Sweden junior team in the 2009 World Junior Championships, leading all goaltenders with a .946 save percentage and ranking second with a 1.61 goals against average (GAA). Backstopping the Swedes to a silver medal finish, he earned the Directorate award for best goaltender. He again represented Sweden at the 2010 World Junior Championships and could not match his previous year's performance as Sweden earned a bronze medal. Markström did post a respectable .927 save percentage and a 2.21 GAA, both good enough for second place amongst goaltenders in the tournament.

In his first major tournament playing for Sweden senior team, the 2010 World Championship, Markström played three games and recorded a shutout against Switzerland.

Markström then won the 2013 World Championship with Sweden. He was the backup to Jhonas Enroth, and played two games, winning both of them, which allowed Sweden to ultimately win the tournament.

Markström was named to Sweden's roster for the 2016 World Cup of Hockey. Named the backup goaltender, Markström played Sweden's opening game of the tournament after starter Henrik Lundqvist missed it due to an illness. In his lone game of the tournament, Markström helped Sweden defeat Russia 2–1. Sweden ended up losing in the semifinals to Team Europe.

== Career statistics ==
=== Regular season and playoffs ===
			Regular season									Playoffs
Season	Team	League	GP	W	L	T/OT	MIN	GA	SO	GAA	SV%	GP	W	L	MIN	GA	SO	GAA	SV%
2006–07	Brynäs IF	J20	1	—	—	—	65	3	0	2.77	—	1	—	—	25	4	0	9.76	—
2007–08	Brynäs IF	J20	22	—	—	—	1320	44	2	2.00	—	—	—	—	—	—	—	—	—
2007–08	Brynäs IF	SEL	7	2	4	1	423	22	0	3.12	.888	—	—	—	—	—	—	—	—
2008–09	Brynäs IF	SEL	35	13	14	5	1992	79	3	2.38	.917	1	0	1	59	2	0	2.02	.923
2009–10	Brynäs IF	SEL	43	21	11	10	2542	85	5	2.01	.927	4	1	3	224	12	0	3.21	.903
2010–11	Rochester Americans	AHL	37	16	20	1	2174	108	1	2.98	.907	—	—	—	—	—	—	—	—
2010–11	Florida Panthers	NHL	1	0	1	0	40	2	0	3.00	.857	—	—	—	—	—	—	—	—
2011–12	San Antonio Rampage	AHL	32	17	12	1	1839	71	1	2.32	.927	8	4	4	546	26	0	2.85	.907
2011–12	Florida Panthers	NHL	7	2	4	1	383	17	0	2.66	.923	—	—	—	—	—	—	—	—
2012–13	San Antonio Rampage	AHL	33	16	15	2	1972	87	3	2.65	.920	—	—	—	—	—	—	—	—
2012–13	Florida Panthers	NHL	23	8	14	1	1266	68	0	3.22	.901	—	—	—	—	—	—	—	—
2013–14	Florida Panthers	NHL	12	1	6	3	614	36	0	3.52	.874	—	—	—	—	—	—	—	—
2013–14	San Antonio Rampage	AHL	29	12	11	3	1688	72	2	2.56	.918	—	—	—	—	—	—	—	—
2013–14	Vancouver Canucks	NHL	4	1	2	0	200	10	0	3.00	.868	—	—	—	—	—	—	—	—
2014–15	Utica Comets	AHL	32	22	7	2	1880	59	5	1.88	.934	23	12	11	1450	51	2	2.11	.925
2014–15	Vancouver Canucks	NHL	3	1	1	0	78	4	0	3.08	.879	—	—	—	—	—	—	—	—
2015–16	Vancouver Canucks	NHL	33	13	14	4	1848	84	0	2.73	.915	—	—	—	—	—	—	—	—
2015–16	Utica Comets	AHL	2	1	0	1	125	5	0	2.40	.909	—	—	—	—	—	—	—	—
2016–17	Vancouver Canucks	NHL	26	10	11	3	1417	62	0	2.63	.910	—	—	—	—	—	—	—	—
2017–18	Vancouver Canucks	NHL	60	23	26	7	3414	154	2	2.71	.912	—	—	—	—	—	—	—	—
2018–19	Vancouver Canucks	NHL	60	28	23	9	3599	166	1	2.77	.912	—	—	—	—	—	—	—	—
2019–20	Vancouver Canucks	NHL	43	23	16	4	2552	117	2	2.75	.918	14	8	6	841	40	1	2.85	.919
2020–21	Calgary Flames	NHL	43	22	19	2	2488	111	3	2.68	.904	—	—	—	—	—	—	—	—
2021–22	Calgary Flames	NHL	63	37	15	9	3696	137	9	2.22	.922	12	5	7	712	35	1	2.95	.901
2022–23	Calgary Flames	NHL	59	23	21	12	3411	166	1	2.92	.892	—	—	—	—	—	—	—	—
2023–24	Calgary Flames	NHL	48	23	23	2	2831	131	2	2.78	.905	—	—	—	—	—	—	—	—
2024–25	New Jersey Devils	NHL	49	26	16	6	2903	121	4	2.50	.900	5	1	4	345	16	0	2.78	.911
2025–26	New Jersey Devils	NHL	44	23	19	1	2544	130	1	3.07	.883	—	—	—	—	—	—	—	—
SEL totals			85	36	29	16	4,957	186	8	2.51	.912	5	1	4	283	14	0	2.62	.916
NHL totals			578	264	231	64	33,282	1,516	25	2.73	.907	31	14	17	1,899	91	2	2.88	.911

=== International ===
Year	Team	Event	Result	GP	W	L	T	MIN	GA	SO	GAA	SV%
2008	Sweden	U18	4th	6	4	2	0	355	18	1	3.04	.862
2009	Sweden	WJC	2nd place, silver medalist(s)	5	4	1	0	298	8	1	1.61	.943
2010	Sweden	WJC	3rd place, bronze medalist(s)	5	4	1	0	298	11	0	2.21	.927
2010	Sweden	WC	3rd place, bronze medalist(s)	3	3	0	0	180	4	1	1.33	.944
2013	Sweden	WC	1st place, gold medalist(s)	3	2	1	0	190	5	0	1.58	.934
2016	Sweden	WC	6th	6	3	3	0	361	19	0	3.16	.896
2016	Sweden	WCH	3rd	1	1	0	0	60	1	0	1.00	.964
2019	Sweden	WC	5th	2	1	1	0	120	8	0	4.00	.843
2025	Sweden	WC	3rd place, bronze medalist(s)	6	4	2	0	336	12	2	2.14	.894
2026	Sweden	OG	7th	3	2	0	1	183	6	0	1.97	.936
Junior totals				16	12	4	0	951	37	2	2.33	.920
Senior totals				24	16	7	1	1430	55	3	2.31	.911

== Awards and honours ==
Award	Year	Ref
AHL
AHL All-Star Game	2015	
AHL Second All-Star Team	2015	
SEL
Honken Trophy	2010	
Rookie of the Year	2010	
All-Star Team	2010	
NHL
NHL All-Star Game	2020	
NHL Second All-Star Team	2022	
Vancouver Canucks
Cyclone Taylor Trophy	2019, 2020	
Three Stars Award	2018, 2019, 2020	
International
World Junior Championship best goaltender	2009	
