= Derek Dorsett =

Canadian ice hockey player (born 1986)

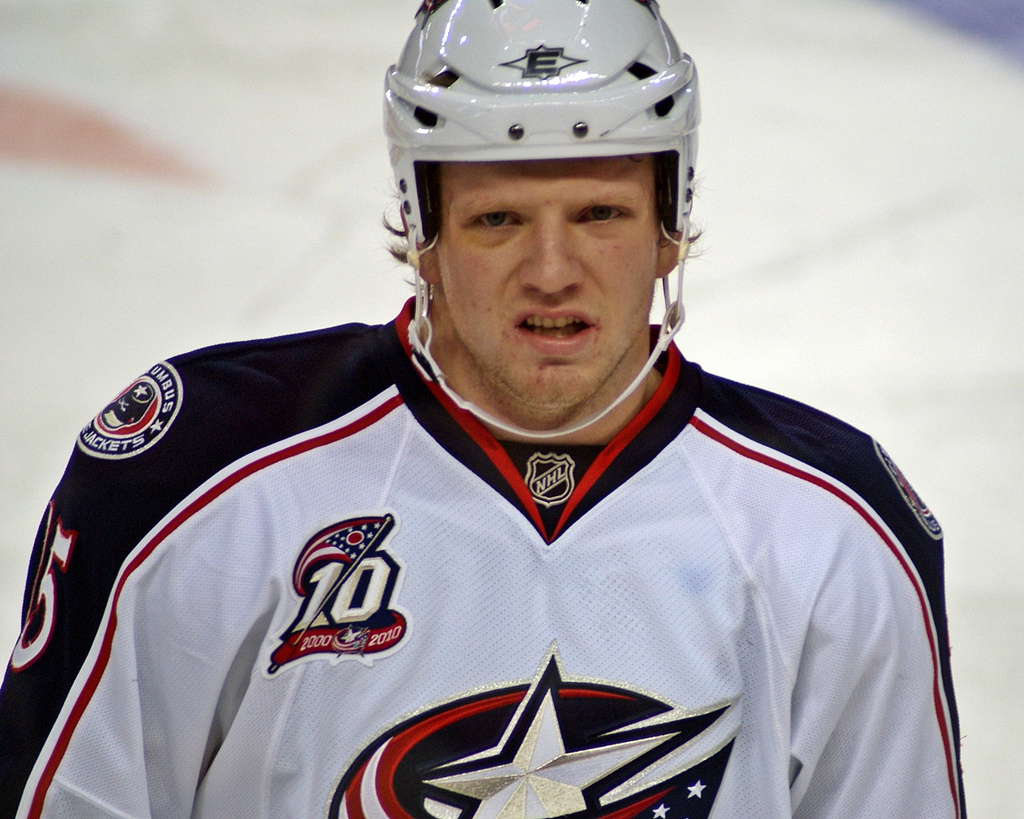
- Dorsett with the Columbus Blue Jackets in 2010
- Born: December 20, 1986 (age 39) Kindersley, Saskatchewan, Canada
- Height: 6 ft 0 in (183 cm)
- Weight: 192 lb (87 kg; 13 st 10 lb)
- Position: Right wing
- Shot: Right
- Played for: Columbus Blue Jackets; New York Rangers; Vancouver Canucks
- NHL draft: 189th overall, 2006; Columbus Blue Jackets
- Playing career: 2007–2017

Derek Dorsett (born December 20, 1986) is a Canadian former professional ice hockey right winger who played for the Columbus Blue Jackets, New York Rangers and Vancouver Canucks of the National Hockey League (NHL). The Blue Jackets drafted him in 2006 in the seventh round, 189th overall. After nine years in the NHL, Dorsett retired after repeated injuries to his neck. Dorsett was best known for his role similar to that of an enforcer. He is currently a forward development coach for the Buffalo Sabres.

== Playing career ==
=== Junior ===
Dorsett played major junior ice hockey with the Medicine Hat Tigers of the Western Hockey League (WHL) and helped them win the Ed Chynoweth Cup as WHL champions in 2006–07. Dorsett established himself as a gritty player with Medicine Hat, leading the team in penalty minutes in 2006–07 while finishing tied for second in team scoring with 64 points.

=== Professional ===
==== Columbus Blue Jackets ====
Dorsett was drafted by the Columbus Blue Jackets 189th overall in the 2006 NHL entry draft. Graduating from major junior, he spent 2007–08 with the Syracuse Crunch, the Blue Jackets' American Hockey League (AHL) affiliate. He scored his first NHL goal the following season on October 21, 2008, against Roberto Luongo in a 4–2 win against the Vancouver Canucks.

==== New York Rangers ====
During the lockout-shortened 2012–13 season, Dorsett was included in a trade deadline deal, along with Derick Brassard, John Moore and a sixth-round pick, to the New York Rangers in exchange for Marián Gáborík and minor league players Blake Parlett and Steven Delisle on April 3, 2013.

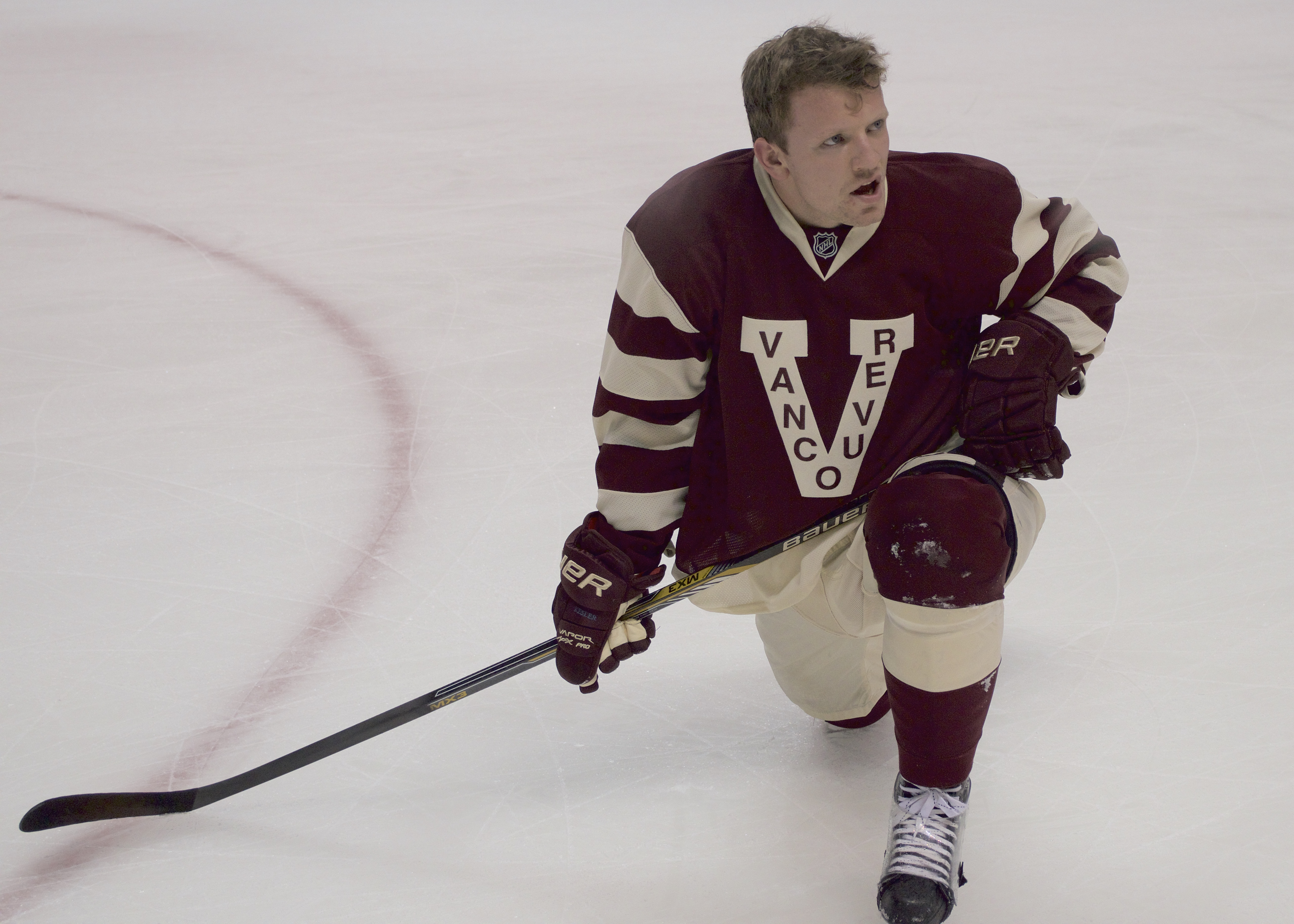
Dorsett during his tenure with the Canucks in 2015.

==== Vancouver Canucks ====
On June 27, 2014, Dorsett was traded by the Rangers to the Vancouver Canucks in exchange for a third-round pick in the 2014 NHL entry draft. Upon joining the Canucks, he switched his jersey number to 51, as his usual 15 was being worn by teammate Brad Richardson. In the 2015 season, he posted career highs in both assists and points, and scored seven goals; his most since 2012 (including three game-winning goals). On April 8, 2015, the Canucks signed Dorsett to a four-year $10.6 million contract extension. Following Richardson's departure from the team in the offseason, Dorsett changed his jersey number back to 15 for the 2015–16 season, where he led the league in penalty minutes with 177.

==== Injury and retirement ====
On December 5, 2016, the Canucks announced that Dorsett had herniated a cervical disc in his neck. The injury required surgery, sidelining him indefinitely. He had managed one goal and three assists in 14 games up to that point in the 2016–17 season.

On November 30, 2017, Dorsett announced his retirement from the NHL. This was simultaneously announced alongside news that he had again herniated a cervical disc in his neck, a separate injury from his previous one. He decided to end his career after learning this information, citing health reasons and risks associated with playing.

"I'm devastated by the news. It will take a long time for this to truly sink in. As hard as it was to hear, Dr. Watkins' diagnosis is definitive. There is no grey area, and it gives me clarity to move forward. I have a healthy young family and a long life of opportunities ahead of me. Hockey taught me a lot and it will help me be successful in whatever I choose to do in the future."

Playing only 20 games in the 2017–18 season, Dorsett managed to record seven goals and two assists, as well as 74 penalty minutes.

== Personal life ==
Dorsett and his wife, Allison, have three children together (two sons and one daughter). They also have a doodle.

== Career statistics ==
Bold indicates led league

			Regular season					Playoffs
Season	Team	League	GP	G	A	Pts	PIM	GP	G	A	Pts	PIM
2003–04	Swift Current Legionnaires AAA	SMHL	42	19	34	53	132	—	—	—	—	—
2004–05	Kindersley Klippers	SJHL	25	12	8	20	172	—	—	—	—	—
2004–05	Medicine Hat Tigers	WHL	51	5	11	16	108	13	5	1	6	35
2005–06	Medicine Hat Tigers	WHL	68	25	23	48	279	13	4	8	12	53
2006–07	Medicine Hat Tigers	WHL	61	19	45	64	206	17	8	8	16	56
2007–08	Syracuse Crunch	AHL	64	10	8	18	289	12	0	1	1	56
2008–09	Columbus Blue Jackets	NHL	52	4	1	5	150	3	0	0	0	2
2008–09	Syracuse Crunch	AHL	7	1	5	6	35	—	—	—	—	—
2009–10	Columbus Blue Jackets	NHL	51	4	10	14	105	—	—	—	—	—
2010–11	Columbus Blue Jackets	NHL	76	4	13	17	184	—	—	—	—	—
2011–12	Columbus Blue Jackets	NHL	77	12	8	20	**235**	—	—	—	—	—
2012–13	EC Red Bull Salzburg	EBEL	4	0	1	1	25	—	—	—	—	—
2012–13	Columbus Blue Jackets	NHL	24	3	6	9	53	—	—	—	—	—
2012–13	New York Rangers	NHL	—	—	—	—	—	11	0	1	1	28
2013–14	New York Rangers	NHL	51	4	4	8	128	23	0	1	1	19
2014–15	Vancouver Canucks	NHL	79	7	18	25	175	6	0	0	0	20
2015–16	Vancouver Canucks	NHL	71	5	11	16	**177**	—	—	—	—	—
2016–17	Vancouver Canucks	NHL	14	1	3	4	33	—	—	—	—	—
2017–18	Vancouver Canucks	NHL	20	7	2	9	74	—	—	—	—	—
NHL totals			515	51	76	127	1,314	43	0	2	2	69

== Awards and honours ==
Award	Year
Vancouver Canucks
Fred J. Hume Award	2015, 2018
