= Eddie Läck =

Swedish ice hockey player and coach

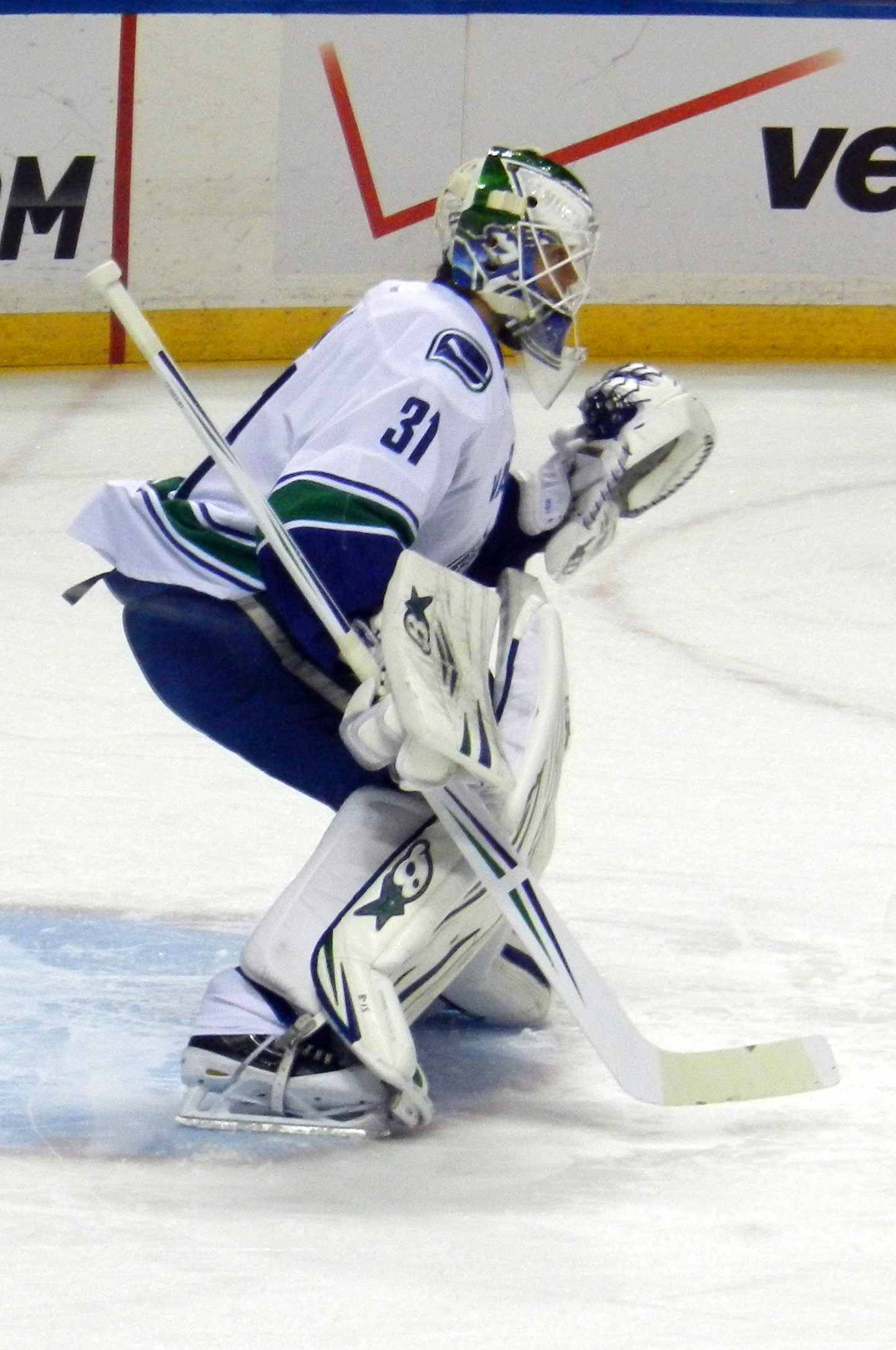
- Läck with the Vancouver Canucks in October 2013
- Born: 5 January 1988 (age 38) Norrtälje, Sweden
- Height: 6 ft 4 in (193 cm)
- Weight: 187 lb (85 kg; 13 st 5 lb)
- Position: Goaltender
- Caught: Left
- Played for: Leksands IF; Brynäs IF; Vancouver Canucks; Carolina Hurricanes; Calgary Flames; New Jersey Devils
- National team: Sweden
- NHL draft: Undrafted
- Playing career: 2006–2018 Coaching career

Coaching career (HC unless noted)
- 2019–2023: Arizona State (assistant)

Eddie Jan Läck (born 5 January 1988) is a Swedish former professional ice hockey goaltender. He served as an assistant head coach of the Arizona State Sun Devils until 2023, and is also currently a real estate agent in the Scottsdale, Arizona region. Läck, a goaltender, played in Sweden for Leksands IF of the HockeyAllsvenskan and Brynäs IF of the Elitserien before moving to the National Hockey League (NHL) where he played for the Vancouver Canucks, Carolina Hurricanes, Calgary Flames and New Jersey Devils. After going undrafted in the 2009 NHL entry draft, he signed as a free agent with the Vancouver Canucks in 2010. He was assigned to the Manitoba Moose in his first season with the Canucks organization and was named to the American Hockey League's 2010–11 All-Rookie Team. He is nicknamed "the Stork", in reference to his tall stature and long legs. In October 2024 Lack became a dual American citizen.

== Playing career ==
=== Sweden ===
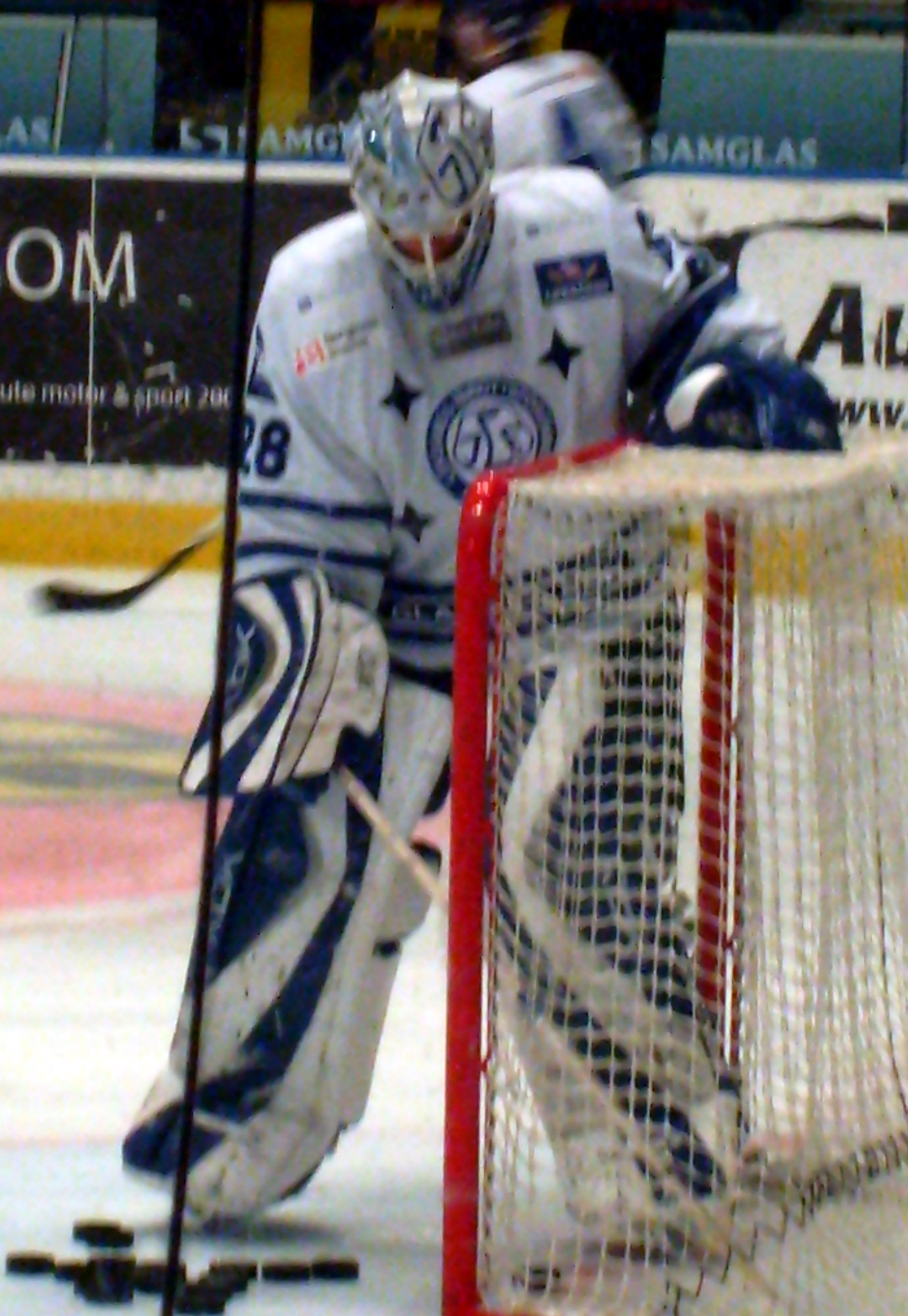
Läck playing with Leksands IF

Läck spent his minor hockey career with his hometown team, Norrtälje IK. He also competed in two TV-pucken tournaments – an annual under-16 national competition – with Stockholm's second regional team. He entered the junior ranks with Djurgårdens IF's organization in 2004–05 and helped the club to a J18 Allsvenskan silver medal. Two years later, he joined Leksands IF at the J20 level.

Läck made his professional debut with Leksands IF's men's team in the HockeyAllsvenskan, Sweden's second-highest league, appearing in three games in 2006–07. The following campaign, he appeared in 26 HockeyAllsvenskan games, recording a 1.96 goals against average (GAA), while still seeing playing time in junior. In 2008–09, he fully established himself with Leksands IF's professional team, outplaying former NHL goaltender Ed Belfour as the club's starter. He posted a 2.02 GAA and .930 save percentage in 32 games.

Going into the 2009 NHL entry draft, he was ranked ninth among European goaltenders by the NHL Central Scouting Bureau, but went unselected. After three seasons with the Leksands IF organization, Läck moved up to the Elitserien, Sweden's premiere league, signing a two-year contract with Brynäs IF on 6 July 2009. He made his Elitserien debut on 17 October, relieving Jacob Markström (who at the time was a Florida Panthers prospect) near the end of the first period. He stopped all 18 shots he faced in a 3–2 loss to Färjestad BK. Läck went on to play in 14 games as a backup to Markström, registering a 2.67 GAA and .911 save percentage.

=== Manitoba Moose/Chicago Wolves ===
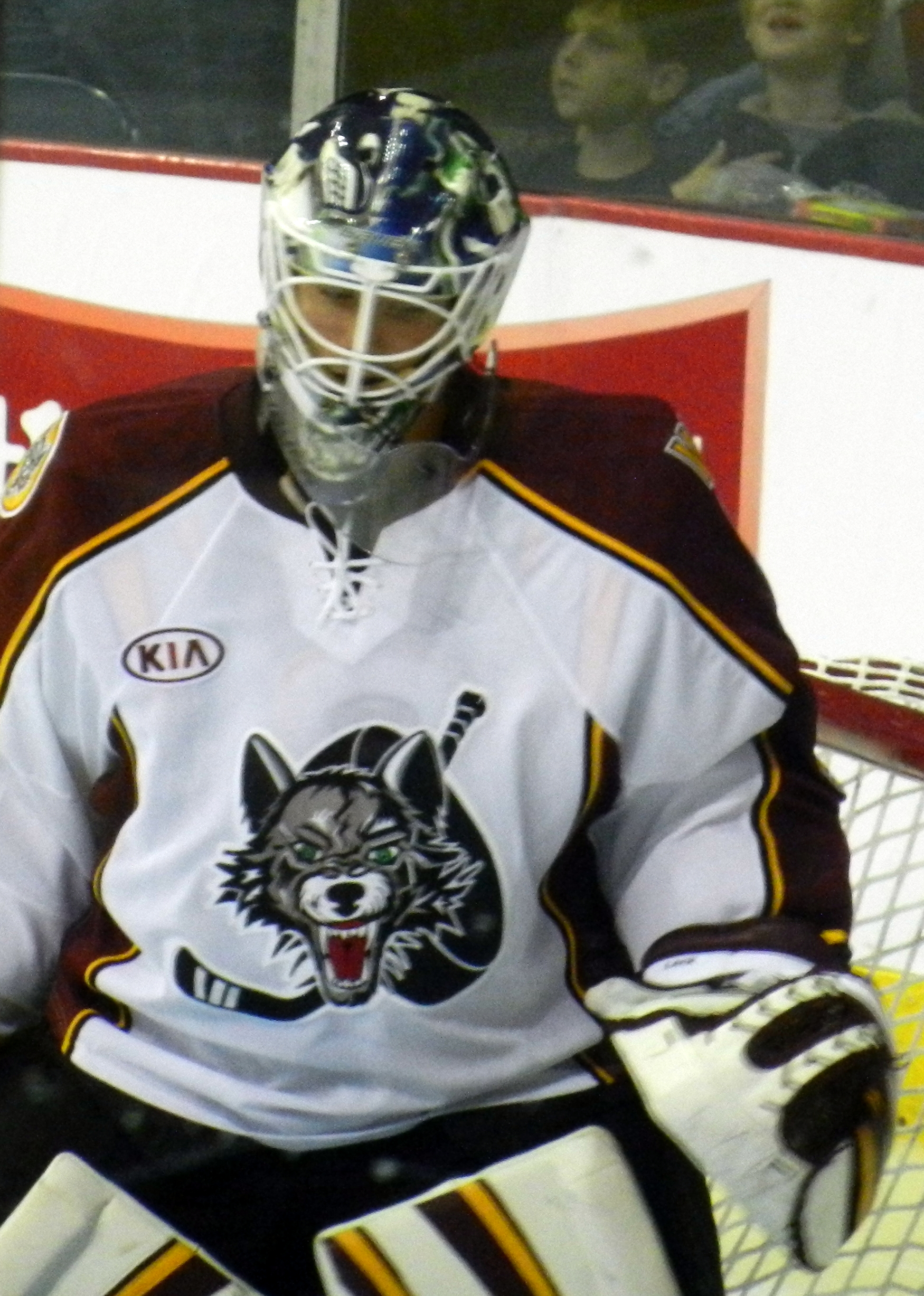
Läck playing for the Chicago Wolves in 2012.

Läck's play garnered the attention of Vancouver Canucks scout Lars Lindgren and in the off-season, he was signed by the Canucks to a two-year, entry-level contract on 6 April 2010. He subsequently left Sweden to begin playing within the Canucks organization. Assigned to the Manitoba Moose, the Canucks' minor league affiliate, he made his American Hockey League (AHL) debut on 9 October, making 23 saves in a 5–2 win over the Rockford IceHogs. Competing for playing time with fellow Moose goaltender Tyler Weiman, Läck emerged as the team's starter, appearing in 53 games (28 wins, 21 losses and 4 overtime or shootout losses). With a 2.26 GAA (ranked seventh in the league) and .926 save percentage (fourth in the league), Läck was named to the AHL All-Rookie Team. During the 2011 Calder Cup playoffs, he helped the Moose to the second round, recording a 1.99 GAA and .932 save percentage in 12 games. Following the Manitoba's elimination to the Hamilton Bulldogs, Läck was called up to the Canucks on 13 May 2011, to travel and practice with the team as a playoff reserve. Vancouver advanced to the Stanley Cup Finals and lost to the Boston Bruins in seven games.

Positioned behind Roberto Luongo and Cory Schneider (joint winners of the 2010–11 William M. Jennings Trophy) on the Canucks' depth chart, Läck was assigned to the AHL for a second season in 2011–12. Due to the Winnipeg Jets' return to the NHL, the Moose franchise was relocated to St. John's, Newfoundland; as a result, the Canucks switched their AHL affiliation to the Chicago Wolves. Läck made his Wolves debut on 8 October 2011, stopping 31 of 33 shots in a 3–2 shootout loss to the San Antonio Rampage. He recorded his first win and shutout with Chicago three games later on 21 October against the Rockford IceHogs. The following month, Läck was called up by Vancouver after starting goaltender Roberto Luongo sustained an injury. He dressed for his first NHL game on 16 November 2011, backing up Cory Schneider in a loss against the Chicago Blackhawks before being reassigned the following day. He finished the season in Chicago posting a 21–20–3 record with a 2.31 GAA and a .925 save percentage. By season's end, he, along with backup Matt Climie, helped set a Wolves franchise record for lowest team goals against average at 2.54. Läck's second season with the Wolves started slowly, as his numbers dropped significantly from the previous season. He had been playing with a hip flexor injury and a decision was made to rest him to allow the injury to heal. The injury eventually required surgery which ended Läck's season. He finished the year playing in 13 games posting a 7–4–1 record with a 3.00 GAA and an .899 save percentage.

=== Vancouver Canucks ===
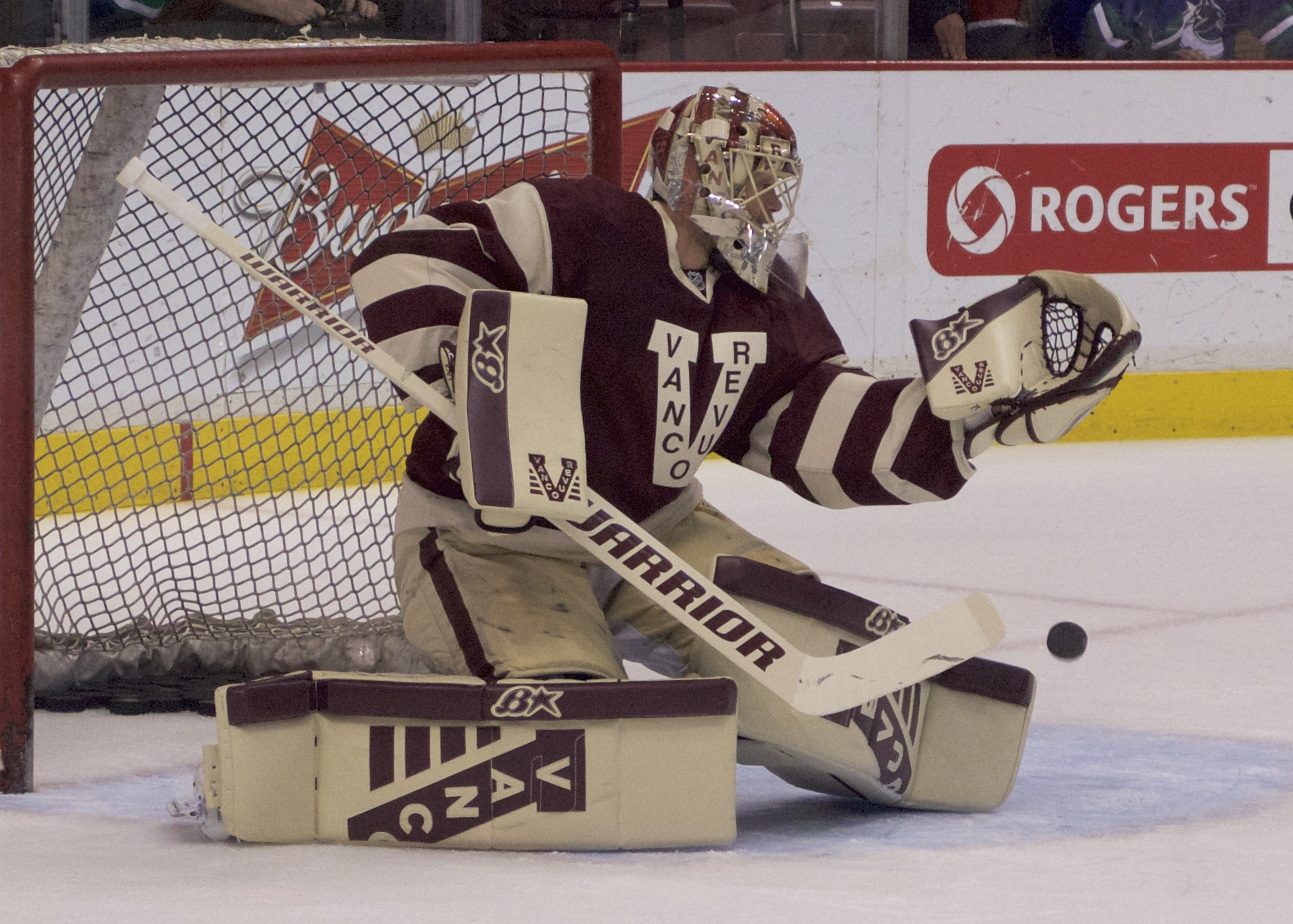
Läck wearing the Canucks' commemorative Vancouver Millionaires jersey on 26 March 2015

Läck was named the Canucks' backup goaltender to start the 2013–14 season, and made his first appearance – and recorded his first win – on 6 October 2013, with a 5–4 overtime win against the Calgary Flames. On 15 November, despite Läck having only made five NHL appearances to date, the Canucks re-signed him to a two-year contract extension worth a total of U.S.$2.3 million. He would record his first NHL shutout in his home ice debut against the Carolina Hurricanes on 9 December 2013.

On 4 March 2014, starting goaltender Roberto Luongo was traded to the Florida Panthers, along with minor leaguer Steven Anthony, for Swedish goaltender Jacob Markström and forward Shawn Matthias, making Läck and Markström (who played together for Brynäs IF) the goaltending tandem for the Canucks, and making Läck an NHL starter for the first time in his career. That summer, however, the Canucks signed Ryan Miller as their starter, but when Miller was hurt in late February 2015, Läck excelled and allowed the Canucks to maintain their playoff position, even starting the Canucks' first few playoff games. Läck recorded his first Stanley Cup playoff victory 17 April 2015, with a 4–1 victory over the Calgary Flames. Läck remained in net until he was pulled in Game 4 in Calgary, at which point Miller returned. The Canucks went on to lose their first-round matchup with Calgary in 6 games.

=== Carolina Hurricanes ===
On 27 June 2015, Läck was traded to the Carolina Hurricanes at the 2015 NHL entry draft in exchange for a 2015 third round pick and a 2016 seventh round pick. Prior to making his debut with the Hurricanes, he was signed to a two-year $5.5 million contract extension through to 2018 on 3 October 2015.

=== Calgary Flames ===
On 29 June 2017, Läck was traded by the Hurricanes along with Ryan Murphy and a 2019 seventh-round pick to the Calgary Flames in exchange for prospect Keegan Kanzig and a sixth-round pick in 2019. On 23 November 2017, Läck was placed on waivers by the Flames with the intention of assigning him to the Flames' AHL affiliate, the Stockton Heat. He was later assigned to the Heat on 24 November 2017.

=== New Jersey Devils ===
On 30 December 2017, Läck was traded to the New Jersey Devils in exchange for defenceman Dalton Prout, and was immediately assigned to the team's AHL affiliate, the Binghamton Devils. He was recalled to the NHL on 4 February 2018, to replace Ken Appleby, and made his first start as a Devil on 11 February against the Boston Bruins. On 17 February 2018, Läck made a career-high 48 saves in a 4–3 win over the Tampa Bay Lightning.

Läck did not play any games for New Jersey during the 2018–19 season, only skating in a mere six games for Binghamton. He underwent hip surgery in December, effectively ending his season.

On 30 March 2020, Läck announced his retirement from professional hockey following a hiatus.

== International play ==
Medal record

Representing Sweden

Ice hockey

World Championships
Gold medal – first place	2017 Germany/France	

Läck was added to the Swedish national team in preparation for the 2017 IIHF World Championship in Germany/France. Originally slated in the backup role to Viktor Fasth, Läck made his international debut in the round-robin stage, posting a 19-save shutout in a 2–0 victory over Latvia on 11 May 2017. With the addition of starting goaltender Henrik Lundqvist to the roster mid-tournament, Läck was subsequently demoted as Sweden's third-choice. He didn't add to his debut game as Sweden claimed the gold medal in a 2–1 shootout victory over Canada on 21 May 2017.

== Coaching career and post-career ==
On 14 August 2019, Läck announced that he would be taking a break from playing ice hockey to focus on rehabbing his hip injury, and accepted a position as goaltender coach for Arizona State University.

Lack is now living in Scottsdale, Arizona with his wife Johanna, where he is also a real estate agent.

== Playing style ==
Läck was considered a big goaltender who used his size to his advantage, looking through traffic to see the puck and aggressively challenging shooters. Despite his size, he is said to have had good lateral movement, covered the bottom of the net well, had good balance, and been positionally sound.

== Career statistics ==
=== Regular season and playoffs ===
			Regular season									Playoffs
Season	Team	League	GP	W	L	OTL	MIN	GA	SO	GAA	SV%	GP	W	L	MIN	GA	SO	GAA	SV%
2004–05	Djurgårdens IF	J20	1	—	—	—	60	6	0	6.00	.872	—	—	—	—	—	—	—	—
2005–06	Djurgårdens IF	J20	23	—	—	—	1,400	49	3	2.10	.918	—	—	—	—	—	—	—	—
2006–07	Leksands IF	J20	30	—	—	—	1,781	85	0	2.86	.919	—	—	—	—	—	—	—	—
2006–07	Leksand IF	SWE-2	2	0	2	0	78	4	0	3.10	.867	1	0	1	59	3	0	3.06	.893
2007–08	Leksand IF	J20	18	—	—	—	1,077	47	4	2.62	.912	3	—	—	179	8	0	2.68	.925
2007–08	Leksand IF	SWE-2	24	20	3	1	1,441	45	4	1.87	.923	2	1	0	89	5	0	3.39	.792
2008–09	Leksand IF	J20	2	—	—	—	120	4	1	2.00	.900	—	—	—	—	—	—	—	—
2008–09	Leksand IF	SWE-2	32	23	9	0	1,905	64	4	2.02	.930	6	4	2	355	14	0	2.36	.903
2009–10	Brynäs IF	J20	6	—	—	—	359	21	0	3.51	.884	—	—	—	—	—	—	—	—
2009–10	Brynäs IF	SEL	14	5	7	1	809	36	0	2.67	.911	2	0	1	79	2	0	1.53	.946
2010–11	Manitoba Moose	AHL	53	28	21	4	3,135	118	5	2.26	.926	12	6	5	752	25	2	1.99	.932
2011–12	Chicago Wolves	AHL	46	21	20	3	2,703	104	4	2.31	.925	5	2	2	304	11	0	2.17	.917
2012–13	Chicago Wolves	AHL	13	7	4	1	760	38	1	3.00	.899	—	—	—	—	—	—	—	—
2013–14	Vancouver Canucks	NHL	41	16	17	5	2,319	93	4	2.41	.912	—	—	—	—	—	—	—	—
2014–15	Vancouver Canucks	NHL	41	18	13	4	2,324	95	2	2.45	.921	4	1	3	198	10	0	3.03	.886
2015–16	Carolina Hurricanes	NHL	34	12	14	6	1,921	90	2	2.81	.901	—	—	—	—	—	—	—	—
2016–17	Carolina Hurricanes	NHL	20	8	7	3	1,090	48	1	2.64	.902	—	—	—	—	—	—	—	—
2016–17	Charlotte Checkers	AHL	2	1	1	0	120	3	0	1.50	.952	—	—	—	—	—	—	—	—
2017–18	Calgary Flames	NHL	4	1	2	0	136	12	0	5.29	.813	—	—	—	—	—	—	—	—
2017–18	Stockton Heat	AHL	5	2	2	1	303	13	0	2.57	.916	—	—	—	—	—	—	—	—
2017–18	Binghamton Devils	AHL	16	6	7	2	973	47	0	2.90	.889	—	—	—	—	—	—	—	—
2017–18	New Jersey Devils	NHL	4	1	2	0	207	11	0	3.18	.903	—	—	—	—	—	—	—	—
2018–19	Binghamton Devils	AHL	6	2	3	1	351	24	0	4.10	.863	—	—	—	—	—	—	—	—
SHL totals			14	5	7	1	809	36	0	2.67	.911	2	0	1	79	2	0	1.53	.946
NHL totals			143	56	55	18	7,996	349	9	2.62	.909	4	1	3	198	10	0	3.03	.886

=== International ===
Year	Team	Event	GP	W	L	T	MIN	GA	SO	GAA	SV%
2017	Sweden	WC	1	1	0	0	60	0	1	0.00	1.000
Senior totals			1	1	0	0	60	0	1	0.00	1.000

== Awards and honours ==
Award	Year
AHL
All-Rookie Team	2011
