= List of Vancouver Canucks award winners =

Vancouver Canucks awards
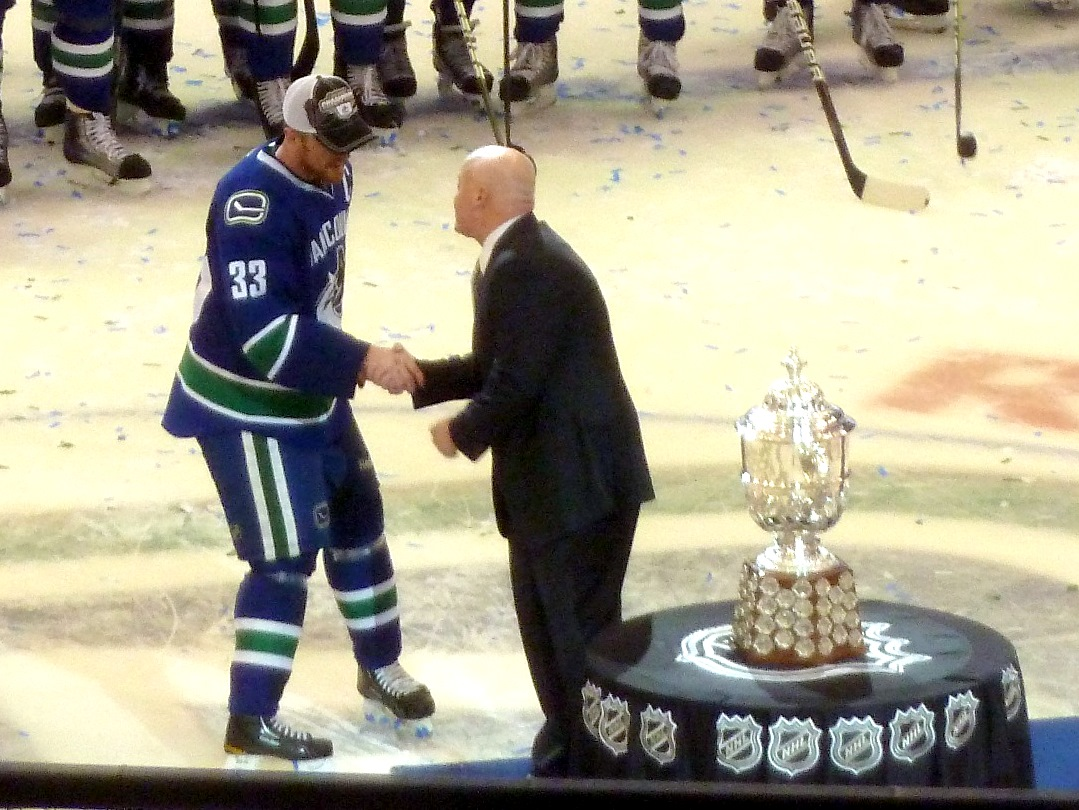
- Henrik Sedin accepting the Clarence S. Campbell Bowl in 2011

Team trophies
- Award*: Wins
- Stanley Cup: 0
- Clarence S. Campbell Bowl: 3
- Presidents' Trophy: 2

Individual awards
- Award*: Wins
- Art Ross Trophy: 2
- Calder Memorial Trophy: 2
- Charlie Conacher Memorial Trophy: 1
- Frank J. Selke Trophy: 1
- General Manager of the Year Award: 1
- Hart Memorial Trophy: 1
- Jack Adams Award: 3
- James Norris Memorial Trophy: 1
- King Clancy Memorial Trophy: 3
- NHL Fan Fav Award: 1
- NHL Foundation Player Award: 1
- NHL Man of the Year Award: 1
- NHL Plus-Minus Award: 1
- Ted Lindsay Award: 2
- William M. Jennings Trophy: 1

Total
- Awards won: 27

The Vancouver Canucks are a Canadian professional ice hockey team based in Vancouver, British Columbia. They are members of the Pacific Division of the Western Conference in the National Hockey League (NHL). The Canucks joined the league in 1970–71 season as an expansion team, along with the Buffalo Sabres.

In their history, the team has captured the Clarence S. Campbell Bowl as Western Conference champions in 1982, 1994 and 2011, but lost in their three Stanley Cup appearances to the New York Islanders, New York Rangers and Boston Bruins, respectively. The Sedin twins have won a combined four awards. Markus Naslund has played in five NHL All-Star Games, the most in Canucks history.

Six players have had their numbers retired by the Canucks organization. Stan Smyl became the first Canuck to have his #12 retired in 1991, followed by Trevor Linden's #16 in 2008, Markus Naslund's #19 in 2010, Pavel Bure's #10 in 2013, Henrik Sedin's #33, and Daniel Sedin's #22 in 2020. Although they have been recognized for their accomplishments with different teams, Igor Larionov, Cam Neely, Mark Messier, Mats Sundin and Pavel Bure are several Hockey Hall of Famers who have played for the Canucks during their careers; former owner Frank Griffiths, coach Roger Neilson and general managers Bud Poile, Jake Milford and Pat Quinn have been inducted as builders. Twin brothers Henrik Sedin and Daniel Sedin, who played in Vancouver for their entire careers, as well as goaltender Roberto Luongo who was an integral part of the team for nearly a decade, were all inducted into the Hockey Hall of Fame as part of the class of 2022.

The Canucks have seven internal team awards – the Molson Cup is awarded to the player who earns the most three-star selections throughout the season; the Cyclone Taylor Trophy is given to the team's most valuable player; Cyrus H. McLean Trophy recognizes the Canucks' leading scorer; the Walter "Babe" Pratt Trophy is given to the best Canucks defenceman; the Fred J. Hume Award is awarded to the Canucks' unsung hero, the Pavel Bure Most Exciting Player Award is awarded to the player judged to be the most exciting on the team, and the Daniel & Henrik Sedin Award is awarded to the player who has best demonstrated community leadership. Each of these awards are presented towards the end of the season.

== League awards ==
=== Team trophies ===
The Canucks have won the Western (previously the Campbell) Conference three times, in the 1982, 1994 and 2011 seasons.

Team trophies awarded to the Vancouver Canucks
Award	Description	Times won	Seasons	References
Clarence S. Campbell Bowl	Western Conference playoff championship	3	1981–82, 1993–94, 2010–11	
Presidents' Trophy	Most regular season points	2	2010–11, 2011–12	

=== Individual awards ===
In their first 21 years, Vancouver Canucks players and staff were not able to win a major individual NHL award until the 1991–92 NHL season. In that year, Pavel Bure won the Calder Memorial Trophy as the league's rookie of the year and Pat Quinn won the Jack Adams Award as coach of the year. Since the 1991–92 season, Canucks players and staff have won an additional 14 individual NHL awards, winning the most awards in the 2010–11 season, with five. The two most decorated Canucks players are Daniel and Henrik Sedin. The Sedins have won a combined five awards, including the Ted Lindsay Award, the Hart Memorial Trophy and becoming the first brother duo to win back-to-back Art Ross Trophies.

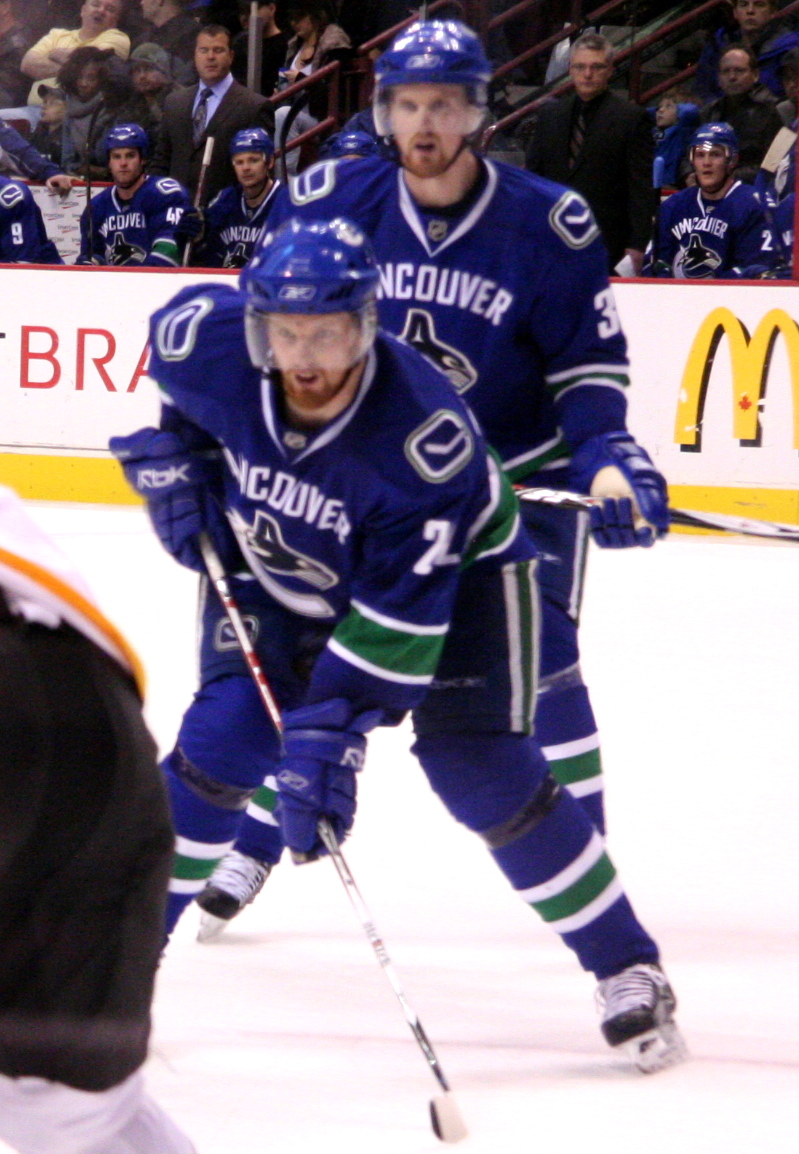
The Sedins became the first brother duo to win the Art Ross Trophy in consecutive years.

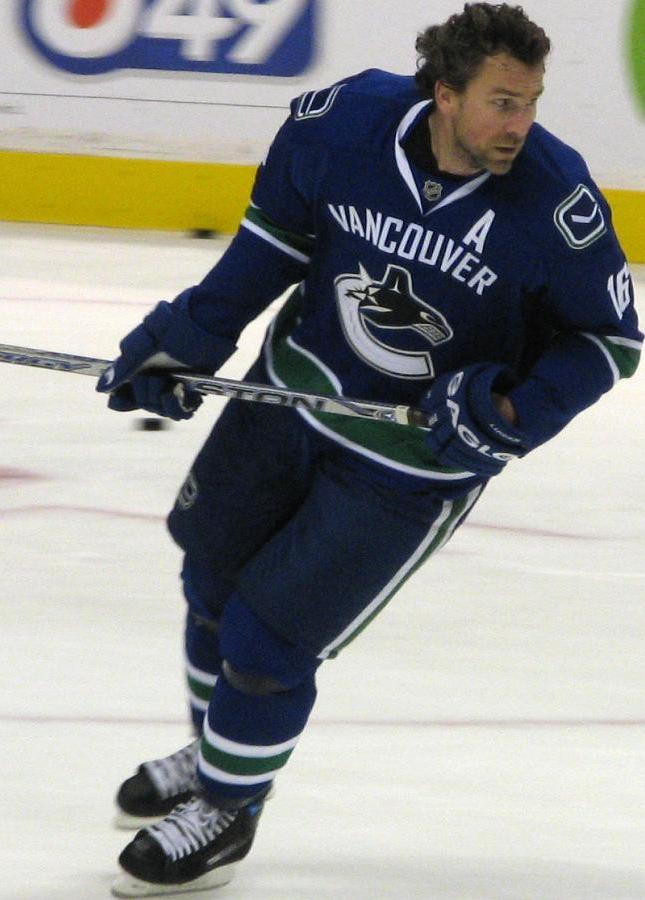
Trevor Linden has won two NHL humanitarian awards as a Canuck.

Individual awards won by Vancouver Canucks players and staff
Award	Description	Winner	Season	References
Art Ross Trophy	Regular season scoring champion	Henrik Sedin	2009–10	
Art Ross Trophy	Regular season scoring champion	Daniel Sedin	2010–11	
Calder Memorial Trophy	Rookie of the year	Pavel Bure	1991–92	
Calder Memorial Trophy	Rookie of the year	Elias Pettersson	2018–19	
Frank J. Selke Trophy	Forward who best excels in the defensive aspect of the game	Ryan Kesler	2010–11	
General Manager of the Year Award	Top general manager	Mike Gillis	2010–11	
Hart Memorial Trophy	Most Valuable Player during the regular season	Henrik Sedin	2009–10	
Jack Adams Award	Top coach during the regular season	Pat Quinn	1991–92	
Jack Adams Award	Top coach during the regular season	Alain Vigneault	2006–07	
Jack Adams Award	Top coach during the regular season	Rick Tocchet	2023–24	
James Norris Memorial Trophy	Top defenseman during the regular season	Quinn Hughes	2023–24	
King Clancy Memorial Trophy	Leadership qualities on and off the ice and humanitarian contributions within their community	Trevor Linden	1996–97	
King Clancy Memorial Trophy	Leadership qualities on and off the ice and humanitarian contributions within their community	Henrik Sedin	2015–16	
King Clancy Memorial Trophy	Leadership qualities on and off the ice and humanitarian contributions within their community	Henrik Sedin	2017–18	
King Clancy Memorial Trophy	Leadership qualities on and off the ice and humanitarian contributions within their community	Daniel Sedin	2017–18	
NHL Foundation Player Award	Community service	Trevor Linden	2007–08	
NHL Man of the Year Award	Sportsmanship and involvement with charitable groups	Ryan Walter	1991–92	
NHL Plus-Minus Award	Highest plus/minus	Marek Malik	2003–04	
Scotiabank Fan Fav Award	Awarded to a National Hockey League player based on fan voting	Roberto Luongo	2008–09	
Ted Lindsay Award	Most outstanding player during the regular season	Markus Naslund	2002–03	
Ted Lindsay Award	Most outstanding player during the regular season	Daniel Sedin	2010–11	
William M. Jennings Trophy	Fewest goals given up in the regular season	Roberto Luongo	2010–11	
William M. Jennings Trophy	Fewest goals given up in the regular season	Cory Schneider	2010–11	

== All-Stars ==
=== NHL first and second team All-Stars ===
The NHL first and second team All-Stars are the top players at each position as voted on by the Professional Hockey Writers' Association.

Vancouver Canucks selected to the NHL First and Second Team All-Stars
Player	Position	Selections	Season	Team
Todd Bertuzzi	Right wing	1	2002–03	1st
Pavel Bure	Right wing	1	1993–94	1st
Thatcher Demko	Goaltender	1	2023–24	2nd
Quinn Hughes	Defence	2	2023–24	1st
Quinn Hughes	Defence	2	2024–25	2nd
Roberto Luongo	Goaltender	1	2006–07	2nd
Kirk McLean	Goaltender	1	1991–92	2nd
Alexander Mogilny	Right wing	1	1995–96	2nd
Markus Naslund	Left wing	3	2001–02	1st
Markus Naslund	Left wing	3	2002–03	1st
Markus Naslund	Left wing	3	2003–04	1st
Daniel Sedin	Left wing	2	2009–10	2nd
Daniel Sedin	Left wing	2	2010–11	1st
Henrik Sedin	Centre	2	2009–10	1st
Henrik Sedin	Centre	2	2010–11	1st

=== NHL All-Rookie Team ===
The NHL All-Rookie Team consists of the top rookies at each position as voted on by the Professional Hockey Writers' Association.

Vancouver Canucks selected to the NHL All-Rookie Team
Player	Position	Season
Brock Boeser	Forward	2017–18
Corey Hirsch	Goaltender	1995–96
Quinn Hughes	Defence	2019–20
Trevor Linden	Forward	1988–89
Mattias Ohlund	Defence	1997–98
Elias Pettersson	Forward	2018–19
Jim Sandlak	Forward	1986–87

=== All-Star Game selections ===
The National Hockey League All-Star Game is a mid-season exhibition game held annually between many of the top players of each season. Forty-one All-Star Games have been held since the Canucks' inaugural season. The All-Star Game has not been held in various years: 1995, 2005 and 2013 as a result of labour stoppages; 2021 as a result of the COVID-19 pandemic; 2006, 2010, 2014 and 2026 because of the Winter Olympics; 2025 when it was replaced by the 2025 4 Nations Face-Off; 1979 and 1987 due to the 1979 Challenge Cup; and the Rendez-vous '87 series between the NHL and the Soviet national team. The NHL also held a Young Stars Game for first- and second-year players from 2002 to 2009.

The Canucks hosted the 1977 All-Star Game at the Pacific Coliseum and the 1998 NHL All-Star Game at General Motors Place. In 1977, Harold Snepsts was the lone Canucks representative as the Wales Conference defeated the Campbell Conference 4–3 in front of 15,607 in attendance. In 1998, both Mark Messier and Pavel Bure were the two Canucks representatives at the All-Star Game, with Messier playing for the North America All-Stars and Bure with the World All-Stars. Team North America won the game 8–7 in front of a sold-out crowd of 18,422. Currently, Markus Naslund played a franchise-high five All-Star Games as a member of the Canucks and Brock Boeser is the only Canuck to ever be named NHL All-Star MVP (2018).

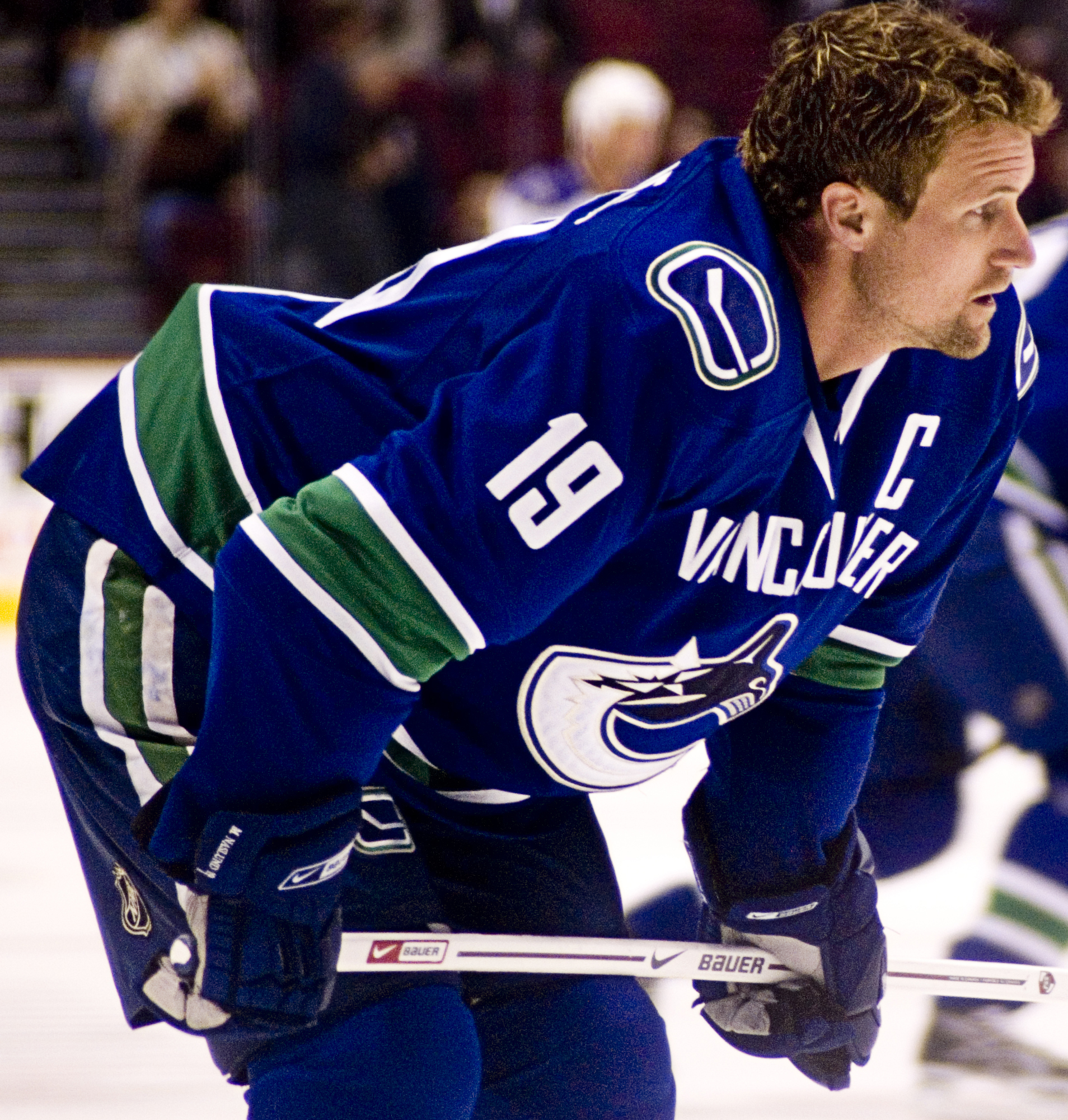
Markus Naslund participated in five NHL All-Star Games as a Canuck.

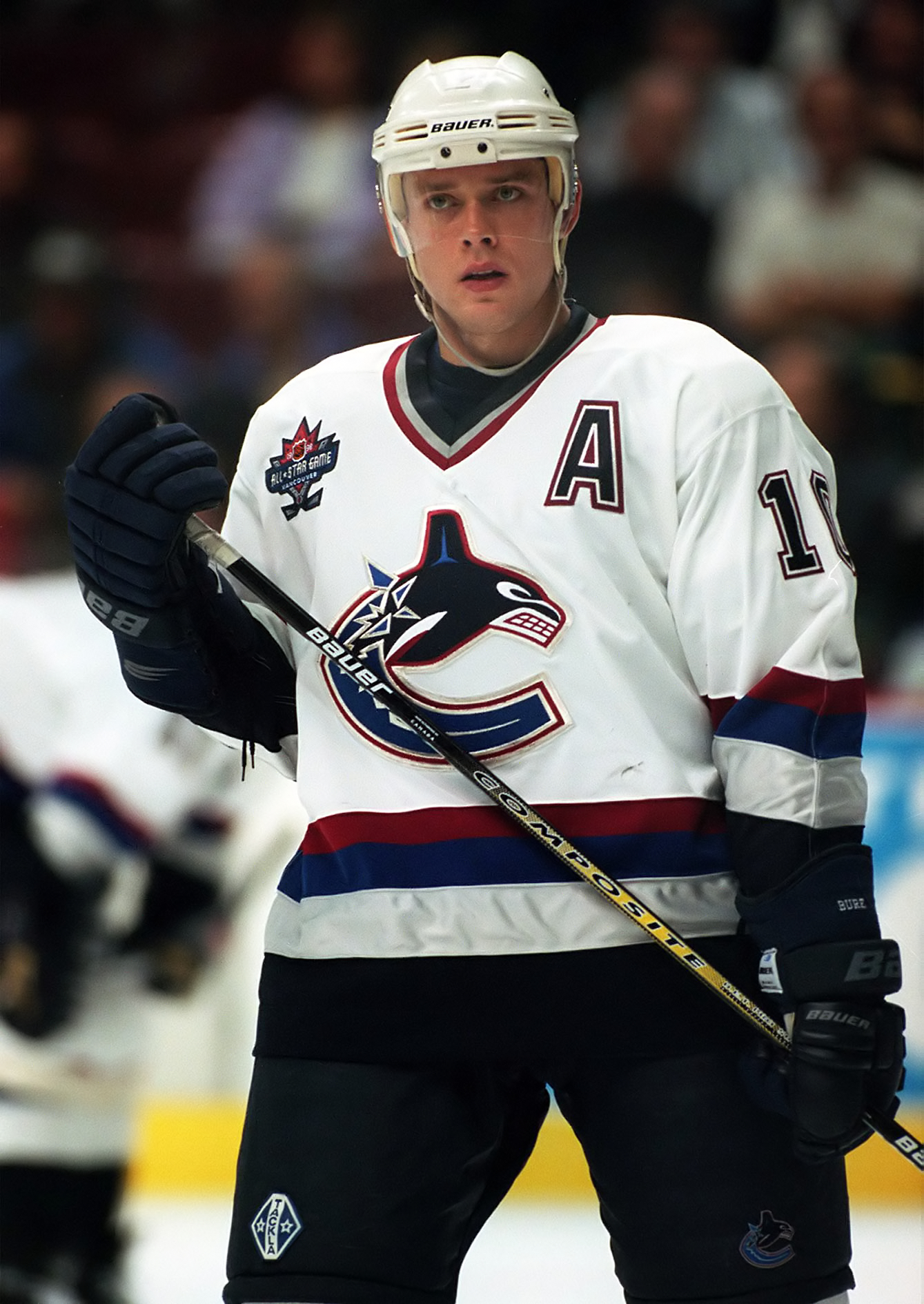
Pavel Bure participated in four NHL All-Star Games as a Canuck.

- † Selected by fan vote
- # Selected as one of four "last men in" by fan vote
- ↑ All-Star Game Most Valuable Player

Vancouver Canucks players and coaches selected to the All-Star Game
Game	Year	Name	Position	References
24th	1971	Dale Tallon	Defence	
25th	1972	Dale Tallon	Defence	
26th	1973	Bobby Schmautz	Right wing	
27th	1974	Jocelyn Guevremont	Defence	
27th	1974	Bobby Schmautz	Right wing	
28th	1975	Tracy Pratt	Defence	
28th	1975	Gary Smith	Goaltender	
29th	1976	Dennis Ververgaert	Right wing	
30th	1977	Harold Snepsts	Defence	
31st	1978	Dennis Ververgaert	Right wing	
32nd	1980	Lars Lindgren	Defence	
33rd	1981	Kevin McCarthy	Defence	
33rd	1981	Tiger Williams	Left wing	
34th	1982	Harold Snepsts	Defence	
35th	1983	Richard Brodeur (Did not play)	Goaltender	
35th	1983	John Garrett (Replaced Brodeur)	Goaltender	
35th	1983	Roger Neilson	Coach	
36th	1984	Darcy Rota (Replaced Tanti)	Left wing	
36th	1984	Tony Tanti (Did not play)	Right wing	
37th	1985	Thomas Gradin	Centre	
38th	1986	Tony Tanti	Right wing	
39th	1988	Greg Adams	Centre	
40th	1989	Paul Reinhart	Defence	
41st	1990	Kirk McLean	Goaltender	
42nd	1991	Trevor Linden	Right wing	
43rd	1992	Trevor Linden	Right wing	
43rd	1992	Kirk McLean	Goaltender	
44th	1993	Pavel Bure†	Right wing	
45th	1994	Pavel Bure†	Right wing	
46th	1996	Pavel Bure† (Did not play)	Right wing	
46th	1996	Alexander Mogilny	Right wing	
47th	1997	Pavel Bure	Right wing	
48th	1998	Pavel Bure	Right wing	
48th	1998	Mark Messier	Centre	
49th	1999	Markus Naslund	Right wing	
49th	1999	Mattias Ohlund	Defence	
50th	2000	Mark Messier	Centre	
51st	2001	Ed Jovanovski	Defence	
51st	2001	Markus Naslund	Left wing	
52nd	2002	Ed Jovanovski	Defence	
52nd	2002	Markus Naslund	Right wing	
53rd	2003	Todd Bertuzzi	Right wing	
53rd	2003	Marc Crawford	Coach	
53rd	2003	Ed Jovanovski	Defence	
53rd	2003	Markus Naslund	Left wing	
54th	2004	Todd Bertuzzi†	Right wing	
54th	2004	Marc Crawford	Assistant coach	
54th	2004	Markus Naslund	Left wing	
55th	2007	Roberto Luongo†	Goaltender	
56th	2008	Roberto Luongo† (Did not play)	Goaltender	
56th	2008	Henrik Sedin	Centre	
57th	2009	Roberto Luongo	Goaltender	
58th	2011	Ryan Kesler	Centre	
58th	2011	Daniel Sedin	Left wing	
58th	2011	Henrik Sedin	Centre	
58th	2011	Alain Vigneault	Coach	
59th	2012	Alexander Edler	Defence	
59th	2012	Daniel Sedin	Left wing	
59th	2012	Henrik Sedin	Centre	
60th	2015	Radim Vrbata	Right wing	
61st	2016	Daniel Sedin	Left wing	
62nd	2017	Bo Horvat	Centre	
63rd	2018	Brock Boeser↑	Right wing	
64th	2019	Elias Pettersson	Centre	
65th	2020	Quinn Hughes#	Defence	
65th	2020	Jacob Markstrom (Replaced Marc-Andre Fleury)	Goaltender	
65th	2020	Elias Pettersson	Centre	
66th	2022	Thatcher Demko	Goaltender	
67th	2023	Bo Horvat (Note: Horvat was voted in as a member of the Vancouver Canucks. A trade on January 30 saw Horvat moved to the New York Islanders. Horvat still played for the Pacific Division all-stars but as a representative of the Islanders.)†	Centre	
67th	2023	Elias Pettersson	Centre	
68th	2024	Brock Boeser†	Right wing	
68th	2024	Thatcher Demko†	Goaltender	
68th	2024	Quinn Hughes	Defence	
68th	2024	Elias Lindholm	Centre	
68th	2024	J. T. Miller†	Centre	
68th	2024	Elias Pettersson†	Centre	
68th	2024	Rick Tocchet	Coach	

=== All-Star Game replacement events ===
Vancouver Canucks players and coaches selected to All-Star Game replacement events
Event	Year	Name	Position	References
4 Nations Face-Off	2025	Quinn Hughes (United States) (Did not play)	Defense	
4 Nations Face-Off	2025	Kevin Lankinen (Finland)	Goaltender	
4 Nations Face-Off	2025	Elias Pettersson (Sweden)	Centre	
4 Nations Face-Off	2025	Rick Tocchet (Canada)	Coach	

== Career achievements ==
=== Hockey Hall of Fame ===
Before entering the NHL, the Vancouver Canucks of the WHL and PCHL had six notable players and one builder that was inducted to the Hockey Hall of Fame. The list of Hall of Famers included Andy Bathgate, Johnny Bower, Tony Esposito, Allan Stanley, Gump Worsley and former owner Fred J. Hume, who was inducted under the Builders category. Bill Cowley was also inducted as a player, although his only affiliation with the Canucks was general manager and head coach in 1948–49.

Since entering the NHL in 1970, several members of the Vancouver Canucks organization have been honoured by the Hockey Hall of Fame. Cam Neely was the first Canucks player inducted, gaining election in 2005, although the majority of Neely's career and success was spent with the Boston Bruins. Within the next three years, Mark Messier would also be inducted into the Hall of Fame in 2007, along with Igor Larionov in 2008 and Mats Sundin in 2012, though their career accomplishments were well-known on other teams.

Pavel Bure was the first Hall of Famer to spend the majority of his playing career with the Canucks. Known for his skating ability, the "Russian Rocket" spent seven seasons in Vancouver, accumulating 478 points (254 goals and 224 assists) in 428 games, winning the Calder Memorial Trophy as rookie of the year in 1992, being named an NHL First All-Star in 1994 and participated in four NHL All-Star Games. He is also the current club record holder for most goals in a season (60; (both 1992–93 and 1993–94) and club holder of most shorthanded goals (24).

Henrik Sedin, alongside twin brother Daniel Sedin, was inducted into the Hockey Hall of Fame in 2022. In doing so, they became the first players to have spent their entire careers with the Canucks to achieve this honour. Henrik was known as the playmaker, while Daniel was the goal scorer. Henrik leads the franchise in games played (1330), assists (830) and points (1040), while Daniel leads in goals (393) and trails only his brother in the aforementioned categories. Henrik's greatest season was 2009-10, where he captured the Canucks' first Art Ross Trophy and Hart Trophy with a franchise-record 112 points. Daniel would follow up that feat with his own Art Ross Trophy and Ted Lindsay Award in 2010-11. The brothers became the only sibling duo to win consecutive scoring titles and to this day are the only pair to both surpass 1000 career points. Alongside fellow 2022 inductee Roberto Luongo, the Sedin twins led the Canucks on their own deep playoff run, eventually falling short to the Boston Bruins in a hard fought 7 game finals series in 2011. The Sedins capped off their near two-decade careers as Canucks in 2018 by sharing the King Clancy Memorial Trophy, a tribute to the respect they garnered from their peers.

Inducted into the Hall of Fame in 2022, Roberto Luongo established several Canucks team records. "Bobby Lu" tops the franchise goalie rankings in wins (252), save percentage (.919, min. 100 GP), GAA (2.36, min. 100 GP) and shutouts (38). In 2006-07, Luongo set personal and franchise records playing in 76 games and winning 47, 1 behind the NHL record for wins in a season (48), earning him 2nd place finishes for both the Vezina Trophy and the Hart Trophy. As a member of the host city's NHL franchise, Luongo would emerge as the starting netminder for Team Canada as they went on to win gold at the 2010 Winter Olympics in Vancouver, his first of two Olympic gold medals (2010, 2014). In 2010-11, Luongo would once again be nominated for the Vezina Trophy as he tied the league-lead with 38 wins. For his efforts, as well as his teammates, the Canucks won a franchise-best 54 wins and captured the first of two President's Trophies in Lu's tenure. Allowing the fewest goals of any team in the NHL that season, Luongo and his backup Cory Schneider were awarded the William M. Jennings Trophy.

Five members of team management have been inducted in the "Builders" category. Two former general managers, Bud Poile and Jake Milford, were the first two members inducted into the Hall of Fame. Poile was the Canucks' first general manager in 1970 and was inducted in 1990, while Milford became general manager from 1977 to 1982, building the team that went to the Stanley Cup Finals in 1982. Milford served as the club's senior vice-president until his sudden death on December 24, 1984, which occurred one month after his induction.

Long-time owner Frank Griffiths would be the third Canucks builder to be inducted in 1993. Griffiths was the majority owner of the Canucks from 1974 until his death in 1994.

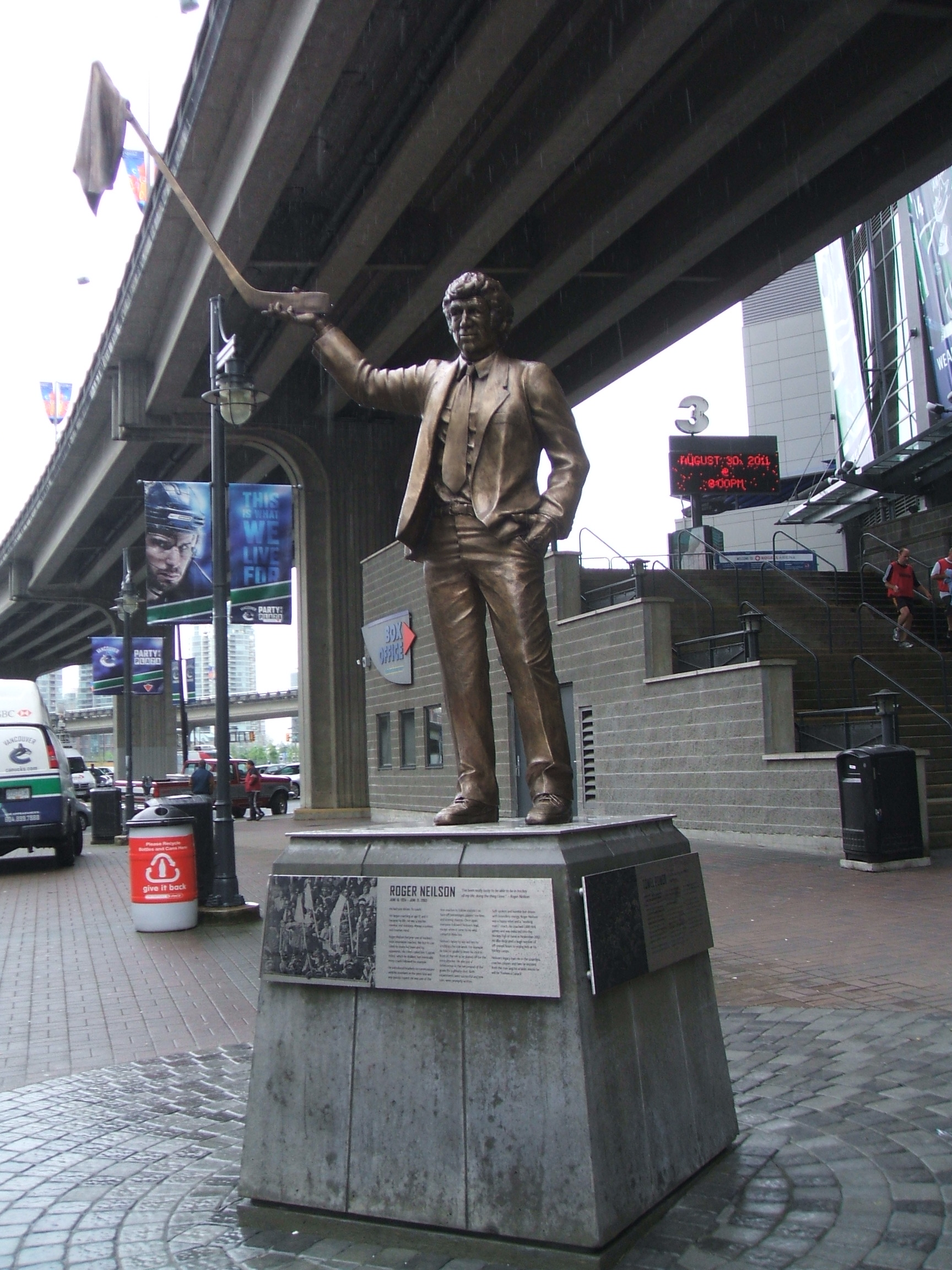
Roger Neilson statue commemorating the towel power event in 1982

In 2002, Former head coach Roger Neilson became the fourth Canucks builder to be inducted into the Hall of Fame. Neilson started as an assistant coach, but eventually took over the coaching duties in March 1982 after coach Harry Neale was suspended for taking part in an altercation with fans during a brawl in Quebec. In that same year, Neilson led the Canucks to the Finals and in Game 2 of the Campbell Conference Finals against the Chicago Blackhawks; he felt his team was unfairly penalized on several occasions during the third period and took a trainer's white towel and held it on a hockey stick, as if to say, "I give up." Three other Canuck players did the same thing, and all were ejected from the game. By doing so, Neilson inadvertently started a Canucks playoff tradition known as "Towel Power."

The third general manager and fifth builder to be inducted into the Hall of Fame was Pat Quinn who served as Canucks' general manager for ten years with four of those years as head coach. Quinn, was known for building the Canucks to respectability during the early nineties as the team finished with back-to-back division titles in 1992 and 1993, and were one win away from winning the Stanley Cup in 1994. That success was due in part with the trades that Pat Quinn started in 1987 when his first move was obtaining a young goaltender, Kirk McLean and left winger, Greg Adams from the New Jersey Devils and picking two notable drafts with future captain, Trevor Linden in 1988 and future superstar, Pavel Bure in 1989. He later strengthened the team by making trades to acquire Geoff Courtnall, Cliff Ronning, Sergio Momesso and Robert Dirk from the St. Louis Blues in 1991, which paved the way for the team's success. His other most notable trade came in the 1996 season when he traded Alek Stojanov to the Pittsburgh Penguins in exchange for Markus Naslund, which is seen as one of the NHL's most lopsided trades as Naslund became a superstar player in the NHL during the 2000s and was part of the famed "West Coast Express" line with Todd Bertuzzi and Brendan Morrison.

Vancouver Canucks inducted into the Hockey Hall of Fame
Individual	Category	Year inducted	Years with Canucks	References
Pavel Bure	Player	2012	1991–1998	
Brian Burke	Builder	2026	1987-1992, 1998-2004	
Frank Griffiths	Builder	1993	1974–1994	
Igor Larionov	Player	2008	1989–1992	
Roberto Luongo	Player	2022	2006–2014	
Mark Messier	Player	2007	1997–2000	
Jake Milford	Builder	1984	1977–1984	
Alexander Mogilny	Player	2025	1995-2000	
Cam Neely	Player	2005	1983–1986	
Roger Neilson	Builder	2002	1981–1984	
Bud Poile	Builder	1990	1970–1973	
Pat Quinn	Builder	2016	1970–1972, 1987–1997	
Jim Rutherford	Builder	2019	2021–2026	
Daniel Sedin	Player	2022	2000–2018	
Henrik Sedin	Player	2022	2000–2018	
Mats Sundin	Player	2012	2008–2009	

=== Foster Hewitt Memorial Award ===
Two former regional broadcasters for the Vancouver Canucks have been honoured with the Foster Hewitt Memorial Award. Former Canucks radio and television broadcaster Jim Robson was named the recipient of the award in 1992 mostly for his years of service on the team's broadcasts. Robson was the radio voice of the Canucks from 1970 to 1994 and continued to work their television broadcasts until 1999. Robson also did additional work with CBC Television's Hockey Night in Canada, calling three All-Star Games, parts of four Stanley Cup Finals. The other, also a former Canucks radio and television broadcaster, Jim Hughson, was a recipient of the award in 2019 for his work on regional Canucks broadcasts, as well as nationally on Hockey Night in Canada.

Members of the Vancouver Canucks honored with the Foster Hewitt Memorial Award
Individual	Year honored	Years with Canucks as broadcaster
Jim Robson	1992	1970–1999
Jim Hughson	2019	1980–1982, 1994–2008

=== Retired numbers ===
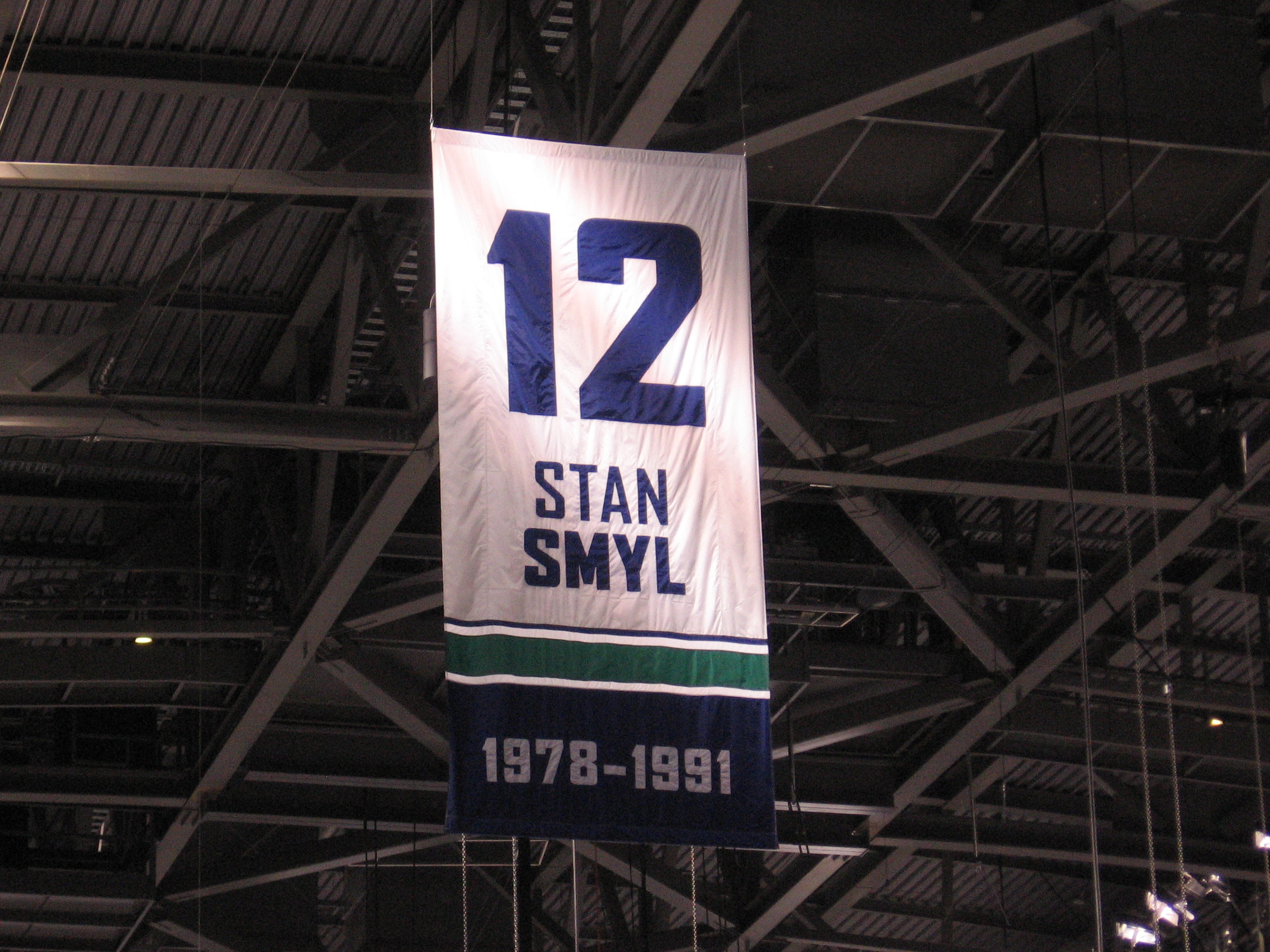
Stan Smyl's #12 banner at Rogers Arena.

The Vancouver Canucks have retired six numbers. The Canucks retired #12 in honour of Stan Smyl who played right wing for the Canucks from 1978 to 1991 and is tied for the most years served as captain with 8. Trevor Linden's #16 was retired in 2008, and was recognized as "Captain Canuck" during his 17 years with the Canucks from 1988–98 and 2001–08. Markus Naslund's #19 was retired in 2010, and was the first Canuck to win the Lester B. Pearson Award for Most Outstanding Player as voted by the players. Hockey Hall of Famer Pavel Bure's #10 was retired in 2013, and is the current single-season club record holder for most goals in a season (60; both 1992–93 and 1993–94) and current club holder of most short handed goals (24). Most recently, Daniel and Henrik Sedin's #22 and #33 were retired in 2020. Henrik is the Canucks all-time regular season leader in game played (1330), assists (830) and points (1070), while Daniel is 2nd in all the aforementioned stats and holds the Canucks regular season records for goals (393), power play goals (138) and overtime goals (16).

Also out of circulation is the number 99 which was retired league-wide for Wayne Gretzky on February 6, 2000. Gretzky did not play for the Canucks during his 20-year NHL career and no Canucks player had ever worn the number 99 prior to its retirement.

Vancouver Canucks retired numbers
Number	Player	Position	Years with Canucks as a player	Date of retirement ceremony	References
10	Pavel Bure	Right wing	1991–1998	November 2, 2013	
12	Stan Smyl	Right wing	1978–1991	November 3, 1991	
16	Trevor Linden	Right wing	1988–1998, 2001–2008	December 17, 2008	
19	Markus Naslund	Left wing	1996–2008	December 11, 2010	
22	Daniel Sedin	Left wing	2000–2018	February 12, 2020	
33	Henrik Sedin	Centre	2000–2018	February 12, 2020	

==== Taken out of circulation ====
The Vancouver Canucks have also unofficially retired three numbers within their organization as remembrance to players whose playing careers were cut short while a member of the franchise.

Wayne Maki played left wing for the Canucks from 1970–73, and was one of the team's leading scorers in the franchises first two seasons. He was diagnosed with brain cancer in December 1972 and died at the age of 29 in 1974. Since then, Mark Messier has been the only Canuck to wear #11 with the Canucks.

Luc Bourdon died in a motorcycle accident on May 29, 2008, near his hometown of Shippagan, New Brunswick. At the 2008–09 season opener, the Canucks honoured Bourdon with a pre-game ceremony and his last game-worn jersey was presented to his family by the fan who won the jersey during an annual charity event the previous season. Afterwards, Tom Cochrane and Red Rider performed "Big League" during the video tribute. The Canucks also wore "LB" on their helmets that season in memory of Bourdon and the Luc Bourdon Wall of Dreams was established to commemorate Bourdon at General Motors Place.

Rick Rypien was found dead in his home in Crowsnest Pass, Alberta, on August 15, 2011, and the cause of death was later confirmed as suicide. Although he joined the Winnipeg Jets in the offseason as an unrestricted free agent, the Canucks honored Rypien's memory early in the 2011–12 season with a video entitled "Heart of a Canuck" and an homage to Rypien was worn on the back of all Canucks helmets for the entirety of the 2011–12 season.

Vancouver Canucks unofficially retired numbers
Number	Player	Position	Years with Canucks as a player	Out of circulation since	References
11	Wayne Maki	Left wing	1970–1973	1974	
28	Luc Bourdon	Defence	2006–2008	2008	
37	Rick Rypien	Centre	2005–2011	2011	

=== Ring of Honour ===
At the start of their 40th season, the Vancouver Canucks decided to launch the Ring of Honour to celebrate and salute Canuck heroes who have made a lasting impact on the franchise.

Members of the Vancouver Canucks inducted into the Ring of Honour
Individual	Primary roles	Years with Canucks	Date of induction ceremony	References
Orland Kurtenbach	Player, Coach	1970–1974, 1976–1978	October 26, 2010	
Kirk McLean	Player	1987–1998	November 24, 2010	
Thomas Gradin	Player, Scout	1978–1986, 1994–	January 24, 2011	
Harold Snepsts	Player	1974–1984, 1988–1990	March 14, 2011	
Pat Quinn	Player, Coach, Executive	1970–1972, 1987–1997	April 13, 2014	
Mattias Ohlund	Player	1997–2009	December 16, 2016	
Alexandre Burrows	Player	2006–2017	December 3, 2019	
Roberto Luongo	Player	2006–2014	December 14, 2023	

== Team awards ==
=== Walter "Babe" Pratt Trophy ===
- Main: Walter "Babe" Pratt Trophy

The Walter "Babe" Pratt Trophy is given to the best Canucks defenceman, as voted by the fans. The trophy is presented at the last home game of the regular season. It was first awarded for the 1972–73 season as the Premier's Trophy, but was renamed after Babe Pratt, Hockey Hall of Fame defenceman and Canucks goodwill ambassador, prior to the 1989–90 season, as Pratt had died in 1989. Quinn Hughes has won the award a record six times.

Season	Winner
1972–73	Barry Wilkins
1973–74	Jocelyn Guevremont
1974–75	Bob Dailey
1975–76	Dennis Kearns
1976–77	Dennis Kearns
1977–78	Harold Snepsts
1978–79	Harold Snepsts
1979–80	Harold Snepsts
1980–81	Kevin McCarthy
1981–82	Harold Snepsts
1982–83	Doug Halward
1983–84	Rick Lanz
1984–85	Doug Lidster
1985–86	Doug Lidster
1986–87	Doug Lidster
1987–88	Jim Benning
1988–89	Paul Reinhart
1989–90	Paul Reinhart

Season	Winner
1990–91	Doug Lidster
1991–92	Jyrki Lumme
1992–93	Dana Murzyn
1993–94	Jyrki Lumme
1994–95	Jeff Brown
1995–96	Jyrki Lumme
1996–97	Jyrki Lumme
1997–98	Mattias Ohlund
1998–99	Adrian Aucoin
1999–00	Mattias Ohlund
2000–01	Ed Jovanovski
2001–02	Ed Jovanovski
2002–03	Ed Jovanovski
2003–04	Mattias Ohlund
2005–06	Mattias Ohlund
2006–07	Kevin Bieksa
2007–08	Willie Mitchell
2008–09	Willie Mitchell

Season	Winner
2009–10	Christian Ehrhoff
2010–11	Christian Ehrhoff
2011–12	Alexander Edler
2012–13	Dan Hamhuis
2013–14	Dan Hamhuis
2014–15	Chris Tanev
2015–16	Ben Hutton
2016–17	Troy Stecher
2017–18	Alexander Edler
2018–19	Alexander Edler
2019–20	Quinn Hughes
2020–21	Quinn Hughes
2021–22	Quinn Hughes
2022–23	Quinn Hughes
2023–24	Quinn Hughes
2024–25	Quinn Hughes

=== Cyclone Taylor Trophy ===
- Main: Cyclone Taylor Trophy

The Cyclone Taylor Trophy is the award given each year to the most valuable player on the Vancouver Canucks as voted by the fans. It is named after Cyclone Taylor, a Canadian professional ice hockey forward who led the Vancouver Millionaires to the Stanley Cup in 1915. The award was dedicated to him prior to the 1979–80 Canucks season, the season after his death on June 9, 1979, although an award for the Canucks MVP has existed since the team's inauguration in 1970. Markus Naslund has won the award five times.

Season	Winner
1970–71	Orland Kurtenbach
1971–72	Orland Kurtenbach
1972–73	Orland Kurtenbach
1973–74	Gary Smith
1974–75	Gary Smith
1975–76	Don Lever
1976–77	Cesare Maniago
1977–78	Thomas Gradin
1978–79	Glen Hanlon
1979–80	Stan Smyl
1980–81	Richard Brodeur
1981–82	Richard Brodeur
1982–83	Stan Smyl
1983–84	Patrik Sundstrom
1984–85	Richard Brodeur
1985–86	Stan Smyl
1986–87	Barry Pederson
1987–88	Tony Tanti

Season	Winner
1988–89	Trevor Linden
1989–90	Kirk McLean
1990–91	Trevor Linden
1991–92	Kirk McLean
1992–93	Pavel Bure
1993–94	Pavel Bure
1994–95	Trevor Linden
1995–96	Trevor Linden
1996–97	Martin Gelinas
1997–98	Pavel Bure
1998–99	Markus Naslund
1999–00	Mark Messier
2000–01	Markus Naslund
2001–02	Markus Naslund
2002–03	Markus Naslund
2003–04	Markus Naslund
2005–06	Alex Auld
2006–07	Roberto Luongo

Season	Winner
2007–08	Roberto Luongo
2008–09	Ryan Kesler
2009–10	Henrik Sedin
2010–11	Daniel Sedin
2011–12	Henrik Sedin
2012–13	Cory Schneider
2013–14	Ryan Kesler
2014–15	Radim Vrbata
2015–16	Daniel Sedin
2016–17	Bo Horvat
2017–18	Brock Boeser
2018–19	Jacob Markstrom
2019–20	Jacob Markstrom
2020–21	Bo Horvat
2021–22	Thatcher Demko
2022–23	Elias Pettersson
2023–24	J.T. Miller
2024–25	Quinn Hughes

=== Cyrus H. McLean Trophy ===
- Main: Cyrus H. McLean Trophy

The Cyrus H. McLean Trophy was named after Cyrus H. McLean who was the former team president of the WHL Vancouver Canucks from 1968–70. The trophy was first awarded in the Canucks' first season, which recognizes the Canucks leading scorer over the course of the regular season. Markus Naslund has won the award the most times, leading the Canucks in scoring seven consecutive years, from 1999 to 2006.

Season	Winner
1970–71	Andre Boudrias
1971–72	Andre Boudrias
1971–72	Orland Kurtenbach
1972–73	Bobby Schmautz
1973–74	Andre Boudrias
1974–75	Andre Boudrias
1975–76	Dennis Ververgaert
1976–77	Rick Blight
1977–78	Mike Walton
1978–79	Ron Sedlbauer
1979–80	Stan Smyl
1980–81	Thomas Gradin
1981–82	Thomas Gradin
1982–83	Stan Smyl
1983–84	Patrik Sundstrom
1984–85	Patrik Sundstrom
1985–86	Petri Skriko
1986–87	Tony Tanti
1987–88	Tony Tanti

Season	Winner
1988–89	Petri Skriko
1989–90	Dan Quinn
1990–91	Trevor Linden
1991–92	Trevor Linden
1992–93	Pavel Bure
1993–94	Pavel Bure
1994–95	Pavel Bure
1995–96	Alexander Mogilny
1996–97	Alexander Mogilny
1997–98	Pavel Bure
1998–99	Markus Naslund
1999–00	Markus Naslund
2000–01	Markus Naslund
2001–02	Markus Naslund
2002–03	Markus Naslund
2003–04	Markus Naslund
2005–06	Markus Naslund
2006–07	Daniel Sedin
2007–08	Henrik Sedin

Season	Winner
2008–09	Daniel Sedin
2008–09	Henrik Sedin
2009–10	Henrik Sedin
2010–11	Daniel Sedin
2011–12	Henrik Sedin
2012–13	Henrik Sedin
2013–14	Henrik Sedin
2014–15	Daniel Sedin
2015–16	Daniel Sedin
2016–17	Bo Horvat
2017–18	Brock Boeser
2017–18	Daniel Sedin
2018–19	Elias Pettersson
2019–20	J.T. Miller
2020–21	Brock Boeser
2021–22	J.T. Miller
2022–23	Elias Pettersson
2023–24	J.T. Miller
2024–25	Quinn Hughes

=== Fred J. Hume Award ===
- Main: Fred J. Hume Award

The Fred J. Hume Award is named after Fred J. Hume, who was the former mayor of Vancouver and owner of the Canucks while they were in the Western Hockey League. The team award is given out at the end of each NHL season to the team's unsung hero, as voted by the fans. From 1970–71 until 2015–16, the winner was decided by the Vancouver Canucks Booster Club. Jannik Hansen won this award 3 times, the most in team history.

Season	Winner
1970–71	Barry Wilkins
1971–72	Ron Ward
1972–73	Dennis Kearns
1973–74	Don Lever
1974–75	Garry Monahan
1975–76	Mike Robitaille
1976–77	Hilliard Graves
1977–78	Hilliard Graves
1978–79	Harold Snepsts
1979–80	Kevin McCarthy
1980–81	Per-Olov Brasar
1981–82	Lars Lindgren
1982–83	Doug Halward
1983–84	Jiri Bubla
1984–85	Doug Lidster
1985–86	Brent Peterson
1986–87	Garth Butcher
1987–88	Rich Sutter

Season	Winner
1988–89	Rich Sutter
1989–90	Steve Bozek
1990–91	Steve Bozek
1991–92	Garry Valk
1992–93	Cliff Ronning
1993–94	John McIntyre
1994–95	Martin Gelinas
1995–96	Martin Gelinas
1996–97	Mike Sillinger
1997–98	Brian Noonan
1998–99	Adrian Aucoin
1999–00	Andrew Cassels
2000–01	Murray Baron
2001–02	Scott Lachance
2002–03	Matt Cooke
2003–04	Brent Sopel
2005–06	Jarkko Ruutu
2006–07	Kevin Bieksa

Season	Winner
2007–08	Alexandre Burrows
2008–09	Steve Bernier
2009–10	Mason Raymond
2010–11	Jannik Hansen
2011–12	Chris Higgins
2012–13	Jannik Hansen
2013–14	Eddie Lack
2014–15	Derek Dorsett
2015–16	Jannik Hansen
2016–17	Markus Granlund
2017–18	Derek Dorsett
2018–19	Antoine Roussel
2019–20	J.T. Miller
2020–21	Tyler Motte
2021–22	Luke Schenn
2022–23	Dakota Joshua
2023–24	Dakota Joshua
2024–25	Kiefer Sherwood

=== Three Stars Award ===
- Main: Molson Cup

The Canucks are one of several teams in Canada that award the Molson Cup to the player who is named one of a game's top three players, or "three stars", most often over the course of the regular season. Roberto Luongo has won the Molson Cup five times, the most in team history. In recent years, the Molson name has been phased out and the award has been simply named the "Three Stars Award."

Season	Winner
1975–76	Bobby Lalonde
1976–77	Cesare Maniago
1977–78	Cesare Maniago
1978–79	Glen Hanlon
1979–80	Glen Hanlon
1980–81	Richard Brodeur
1981–82	Richard Brodeur
1982–83	Thomas Gradin
1983–84	Patrik Sundstrom
1984–85	Richard Brodeur
1985–86	Richard Brodeur
1986–87	Petri Skriko
1987–88	Kirk McLean
1988–89	Trevor Linden
1989–90	Kirk McLean
1990–91	Trevor Linden
1991–92	Pavel Bure

Season	Winner
1992–93	Pavel Bure
1993–94	Pavel Bure
1994–95	Kirk McLean
1995–96	Trevor Linden
1996–97	Martin Gelinas
1997–98	Pavel Bure
1998–99	Garth Snow
1999–00	Mark Messier
2000–01	Markus Naslund
2001–02	Markus Naslund
2002–03	Markus Naslund
2003–04	Dan Cloutier
2005–06	Alexander Auld
2006–07	Roberto Luongo
2007–08	Roberto Luongo
2008–09	Roberto Luongo
2009–10	Henrik Sedin

Season	Winner
2010–11	Roberto Luongo
2011–12	Roberto Luongo
2012–13	Cory Schneider
2013–14	Ryan Kesler
2014–15	Ryan Miller
2015–16	Daniel Sedin
2016–17	Ryan Miller
2017–18	Jacob Markstrom
2018–19	Jacob Markstrom
2019–20	Jacob Markstrom
2020–21	Thatcher Demko
2021–22	J.T. Miller
2022–23	Elias Pettersson
2023–24	Elias Pettersson
2024–25	Quinn Hughes

=== Pavel Bure Most Exciting Player Award ===
- Main: Pavel Bure Most Exciting Player Award

The Pavel Bure Most Exciting Player Award is given to the player judged to be the most exciting, as voted by the fans. Prior to the 2013-14 NHL season, the award was simply known as the Most Exciting Player Award. Tony Tanti and Pavel Bure have won the award five times, tied for the most in team history. Quinn Hughes is the only defenceman to ever win this award.

Season	Winner
1970–71	Andre Boudrias
1971–72	Andre Boudrias
1972–73	Bobby Schmautz
1973–74	Don Lever
1974–75	Bobby Lalonde
1975–76	Bobby Lalonde
1976–77	Hilliard Graves
1977–78	Hilliard Graves
1978–79	Thomas Gradin
1979–80	Stan Smyl
1980–81	Tiger Williams
1981–82	Thomas Gradin
1982–83	Darcy Rota
1983–84	Tony Tanti
1984–85	Tony Tanti
1985–86	Tony Tanti
1986–87	Tony Tanti
1987–88	Tony Tanti

Season	Winner
1988–89	Trevor Linden
1989–90	Brian Bradley
1990–91	Trevor Linden
1991–92	Pavel Bure
1992–93	Pavel Bure
1993–94	Pavel Bure
1994–95	Pavel Bure
1995–96	Alexander Mogilny
1996–97	Martin Gelinas
1997–98	Pavel Bure
1998–99	Markus Naslund
1999–00	Todd Bertuzzi
2000–01	Markus Naslund
2001–02	Todd Bertuzzi
2002–03	Todd Bertuzzi
2003–04	Todd Bertuzzi
2005–06	Anson Carter
2006–07	Roberto Luongo

Season	Winner
2007–08	Alexandre Burrows
2008–09	Alexandre Burrows
2009–10	Alexandre Burrows
2010–11	Ryan Kesler
2011–12	David Booth
2012–13	Jannik Hansen
2013–14	Zack Kassian
2014–15	Radim Vrbata
2015–16	Bo Horvat
2016–17	Bo Horvat
2017–18	Brock Boeser
2018–19	Elias Pettersson
2019–20	Elias Pettersson
2020–21	Nils Hoglander
2021–22	J.T. Miller
2022–23	Andrei Kuzmenko
2023–24	J.T. Miller
2024–25	Quinn Hughes

=== Daniel & Henrik Sedin Award ===
- Main: Daniel & Henrik Sedin Award

The Daniel & Henrik Sedin Award was introduced for the 2019-20 season, in honour of the jersey retirements of the Sedins. Each season it is given to one player who best exemplifies outstanding community leadership qualities and humanitarian contributions to his community. The award is selected by a panel of Canucks Sports & Entertainment members.

Season	Winner
2019–20	Alexander Edler
2020–21	Tyler Motte
2021–22	Brandon Sutter
2022–23	Brock Boeser
2023–24	Quinn Hughes
2024–25	Quinn Hughes

== Defunct team awards ==
=== President's Trophy ===
From 1974–75 to 1995–96, the President's Trophy was awarded to the Canucks' most valuable player. It was originally presented by CP Air and later Canadian Airlines and the player won a pair of airline tickets with the trophy. Obviously, many of the names match the Cyclone Taylor Trophy (also awarded to the MVP) and the trophy was retired after the 1996 season.

Season	Winner
1974–75	Gary Smith
1975–76	Bobby Lalonde
1976–77	Cesare Maniago
1977–78	Cesare Maniago
1978–79	Glen Hanlon
1979–80	Stan Smyl
1980–81	Richard Brodeur
1981–82	Richard Brodeur

Season	Winner
1982–83	Stan Smyl
1983–84	Patrik Sundstrom
1984–85	Richard Brodeur
1985–86	Stan Smyl
1986–87	Barry Pederson
1987–88	Tony Tanti
1988–89	Trevor Linden
1989–90	Kirk McLean

Season	Winner
1990–91	Trevor Linden
1991–92	Kirk McLean
1992–93	Pavel Bure
1993–94	Pavel Bure
1994–95	Trevor Linden
1995–96	Trevor Linden

=== Ram Tough Award ===
The Ram Tough Award was a short-lived award given to the most aggressive player of the Canucks, which was chosen by Canucks management. It was instituted by Pat Quinn at the start of his general manager duties in 1988–89. The winner of the award received a Dodge Ram truck until 1993–94 when the award was no longer in use.

Season	Winner
1988–89	Garth Butcher
1989–90	Ronnie Stern
1990–91	Gino Odjick

Season	Winner
1991–92	Gerald Diduck
1992–93	Trevor Linden
1992–93	Jim Sandlak

Season	Winner
1993–94	John McIntyre

== Other awards ==
Vancouver Canucks who have received non-NHL awards
Award	Description	Winner	Season	References
Charlie Conacher Humanitarian Award	For humanitarian or community service projects	Orland Kurtenbach	1971–72	
Viking Award	Most valuable Swedish player in North America	Thomas Gradin	1981–82	
Viking Award	Most valuable Swedish player in North America	Patrik Sundstrom	1983–84	
Viking Award	Most valuable Swedish player in North America	Markus Naslund	2000–01	
Viking Award	Most valuable Swedish player in North America	Markus Naslund	2002–03	
Viking Award	Most valuable Swedish player in North America	Markus Naslund	2003–04	
Viking Award	Most valuable Swedish player in North America	Henrik Sedin	2009–10	
Viking Award	Most valuable Swedish player in North America	Daniel Sedin	2010–11	
