= 2001 Division 3 (Swedish football) =

Swedish League Division 3
- Season: 2001
- Champions: Piteå IF; IFK Timrå; Forssa BK; Topkapi IK; IFK Lidingö FK; Ludvika FK; Hjulsbro IK; Lundens AIS; Sandareds IF; Karlskrona AIF; Askims IK; IFK Hässleholm
- Promoted: 12 teams above and: Skiljebo SK; Växjö Norra IF
- Relegated: 43 teams

Statistics of Swedish football Division 3 for the 2001 season.

== League standings ==
=== Norra Norrland 2001 ===
Pos	Team	Pld	W	D	L	GF	GA	GD	Pts	Promotion or relegation
1	Piteå IF	22	19	1	2	66	20	+46	58	Promoted
2	Älvsby IF	22	12	6	4	52	30	+22	42	Promotion Playoffs
3	IF Pol/Svanstein, Kalix	22	11	6	5	50	30	+20	39	
4	Morön BK	22	11	6	5	43	27	+16	39	
5	Haparanda FF	22	8	5	9	32	54	−22	29	
6	Sunnanå SK	22	9	1	12	51	49	+2	28	
7	Malmbergets IF	22	7	7	8	35	38	−3	28	
8	Gammelstads IF	22	8	4	10	25	39	−14	28	
9	Sunderby SK	22	8	3	11	37	45	−8	27	Relegation Playoffs
10	Burträsk IK	22	7	3	12	35	46	−11	24	Relegated
11	Hedens IF, Boden	22	4	6	12	26	50	−24	18	Relegated
12	Gällivare SK	22	4	0	18	35	59	−24	12	Relegated

=== Mellersta Norrland 2001 ===
Pos	Team	Pld	W	D	L	GF	GA	GD	Pts	Promotion or relegation
1	IFK Timrå	22	16	4	2	58	14	+44	52	Promoted
2	Matfors IF	22	12	4	6	55	26	+29	40	Promotion Playoffs
3	Betsele IF	22	12	4	6	49	39	+10	40	
4	IFK Sundsvall	22	12	3	7	38	29	+9	39	
5	Gimonäs CK	22	10	4	8	38	29	+9	34	
6	Sävar IK	22	10	4	8	43	37	+6	34	
7	Ytterhogdals IK	22	10	3	9	49	46	+3	33	
8	Lucksta IF	22	9	4	9	38	39	−1	31	
9	Stockviks FF	22	10	0	12	36	50	−14	30	Relegation Playoffs
10	Långsele AIF	22	8	4	10	37	41	−4	28	Relegated
11	Frösö IF	22	3	2	17	18	63	−45	11	Relegated
12	Frånö SK	22	1	2	19	22	68	−46	5	Relegated

=== Södra Norrland 2001 ===
Pos	Team	Pld	W	D	L	GF	GA	GD	Pts	Promotion or relegation
1	Forssa BK	22	14	5	3	49	23	+26	47	Promoted
2	Hudiksvalls ABK	22	12	5	5	45	25	+20	41	Promotion Playoffs
3	Gestrike-Hammarby IF	22	8	10	4	34	28	+6	34	
4	Harmångers IF	22	10	3	9	37	31	+6	33	
5	Falu BS FK	22	7	10	5	29	26	+3	31	
6	IFK Mora FK	22	8	7	7	37	41	−4	31	
7	Sandvikens AIK FK	22	8	5	9	27	29	−2	29	
8	Islingby IK	22	8	5	9	23	29	−6	29	
9	IK Huge, Bomhus	22	7	6	9	33	40	−7	27	Relegation Playoffs
10	Edsbyns IF FF	22	7	5	10	31	37	−6	26	Relegated
11	Korsnäs IF FK	22	3	8	11	25	37	−12	17	Relegated
12	Bollnäs GoIF FF	22	2	7	13	21	45	−24	13	Relegated

=== Norra Svealand 2001 ===
Pos	Team	Pld	W	D	L	GF	GA	GD	Pts	Promotion or relegation
1	Topkapi IK, Stockholm	22	14	2	6	37	19	+18	44	Promoted
2	Skiljebo SK, Västerås	22	13	4	5	46	30	+16	43	Promotion Playoffs – Promoted
3	Vasalunds IF, Solna	22	12	6	4	47	17	+30	42	
4	Bollstanäs SK	22	10	4	8	37	37	0	34	
5	Gamla Upsala SK, Uppsala	22	7	10	5	38	19	+19	31	
6	Spånga IS FK	22	8	6	8	30	26	+4	30	
7	Heby AIF	22	8	4	10	31	37	−6	28	
8	Gimo IF FK	22	7	6	9	22	31	−9	27	
9	BKV Norrtälje	22	7	4	11	23	38	−15	25	Relegation Playoffs – Relegated
10	FC Järfälla	22	5	7	10	22	30	−8	22	Relegated
11	Upsala IF	22	6	3	13	24	48	−24	21	Relegated
12	Håbo FF	22	6	2	14	24	49	−25	20	Relegated

=== Östra Svealand 2001 ===
Pos	Team	Pld	W	D	L	GF	GA	GD	Pts	Promotion or relegation
1	IFK Lidingö FK	22	15	4	3	70	34	+36	49	Promoted
2	Gustavsbergs IF	22	14	5	3	62	30	+32	47	Promotion Playoffs
3	Ängby IF	22	12	4	6	59	38	+21	40	
4	Katrineholms SK FK	22	11	3	8	46	47	−1	36	
5	Älvsjö AIK FF	22	9	6	7	49	35	+14	33	
6	Sundbybergs IK	22	8	6	8	42	44	−2	30	
7	Huddinge IF	22	6	10	6	58	51	+7	28	
8	Älta IF	22	7	7	8	40	42	−2	28	
9	Stureby SK	22	8	4	10	37	48	−11	28	Relegation Playoffs
10	Hargs BK	22	5	5	12	36	63	−27	20	Relegated
11	FOC Farsta	22	5	3	14	41	59	−18	18	Relegated
12	FC Jazzmen, Stockholm	22	1	5	16	25	74	−49	8	Relegated

=== Västra Svealand 2001 ===
Pos	Team	Pld	W	D	L	GF	GA	GD	Pts	Promotion or relegation
1	Ludvika FK	22	14	4	4	41	18	+23	46	Promoted
2	Karlslunds IF HFK, Örebro	22	13	4	5	55	24	+31	43	Promotion Playoffs
3	Örebro SK Ungdom	22	11	4	7	41	35	+6	37	
4	Västerås IK	22	11	2	9	36	33	+3	35	
5	Carlstad United BK	22	9	6	7	34	27	+7	33	
6	IFK Eskilstuna	22	9	4	9	41	36	+5	31	
7	Säffle FF	22	9	4	9	42	38	+4	31	
8	IK Franke, Västerås	22	8	6	8	33	37	−4	30	
9	IFK Västerås FK	22	8	5	9	30	36	−6	29	Relegation Playoffs – Relegated
10	Arboga Södra IF	22	7	6	9	33	40	−7	27	Relegated
11	IK Arvika Fotboll	22	4	4	14	28	43	−15	16	Relegated
12	Skinnskattebergs SK	22	3	3	16	23	70	−47	12	Relegated

=== Nordöstra Götaland 2001 ===
Pos	Team	Pld	W	D	L	GF	GA	GD	Pts	Promotion or relegation
1	Hjulsbro IK	22	16	5	1	59	20	+39	53	Promoted
2	Mjölby AI FF	22	11	8	3	47	21	+26	41	Promotion Playoffs
3	LSW IF, Motala	22	10	7	5	44	34	+10	37	
4	Tenhults IF	22	11	2	9	38	31	+7	35	
5	Tranås FF	22	8	5	9	37	41	−4	29	
6	BK Wolfram, Linköping	22	8	4	10	27	42	−15	28	
7	Malmslätts AIK	22	7	6	9	43	34	+9	27	
8	IF Hagapojkarna, Jönköping	22	7	6	9	33	37	−4	27	
9	Smedby AIS, Norrköping	22	7	5	10	36	40	−4	26	Relegation Playoffs
10	Aneby SK	22	7	5	10	31	38	−7	26	Relegated
11	Hagahöjdens BK, Norrköping	22	6	1	15	25	52	−27	19	Relegated
12	BK Kenty, Linköping	22	5	4	13	19	49	−30	19	Relegated

=== Nordvästra Götaland 2001 ===
Pos	Team	Pld	W	D	L	GF	GA	GD	Pts	Promotion or relegation
1	Lundens AIS, Göteborg	22	14	5	3	61	28	+33	47	Promoted
2	IK Oddevold, Uddevalla	22	14	5	3	49	19	+30	47	Promotion Playoffs
3	Vallens IF, Spekeröd	22	13	3	6	45	28	+17	42	
4	Floda BoIF	22	13	3	6	41	27	+14	42	
5	IF Väster, Göteborg	22	9	5	8	40	26	+14	32	
6	Lerums IS	22	7	9	6	39	31	+8	30	
7	Grebbestads IF	22	8	5	9	29	40	−11	29	
8	Rosseröds IK	22	7	6	9	31	45	−14	27	
9	Skogens IF, Göteborg	22	6	6	10	40	42	−2	24	Relegation Playoffs – Relegated
10	Lundby IF, Göteborg	22	5	8	9	25	30	−5	23	Relegated
11	BK Slätta Damm, Göteborg	22	3	3	16	15	60	−45	12	Relegated
12	Stenungsunds IF	22	2	4	16	11	50	−39	10	Relegated

=== Mellersta Götaland 2001 ===
Pos	Team	Pld	W	D	L	GF	GA	GD	Pts	Promotion or relegation
1	Sandareds IF	22	13	4	5	45	27	+18	43	Promoted
2	Vara SK	22	12	5	5	54	32	+22	41	Promotion Playoffs
3	IFK Skövde FK	22	12	4	6	47	34	+13	40	
4	Jonsereds IF	22	11	5	6	46	27	+19	38	
5	Götene IF	22	10	4	8	42	39	+3	34	
6	Mariedals IK	22	8	5	9	27	33	−6	29	
7	Ulvåkers IF	22	8	4	10	42	41	+1	28	
8	Gerdskens BK	22	7	7	8	34	35	−1	28	
9	Arentorps SK	22	8	3	11	34	51	−17	27	Relegation Playoffs
10	Skövde AIK	22	7	5	10	28	40	−12	26	Relegated
11	IFK Falköping FF	22	7	2	13	29	44	−15	23	Relegated
12	Holmalunds IF, Alingsås	22	2	6	14	24	49	−25	12	Relegated

=== Sydöstra Götaland 2001 ===
Pos	Team	Pld	W	D	L	GF	GA	GD	Pts	Promotion or relegation
1	Karlskrona AIF	22	16	2	4	71	33	+38	50	Promoted
2	Växjö Norra IF	22	14	4	4	61	29	+32	46	Promotion Playoffs – Promoted
3	Växjö BK	22	12	6	4	67	42	+25	42	
4	Västra Torsås IF	22	12	3	7	52	49	+3	39	
5	Ifö/Bromölla IF	22	10	5	7	56	37	+19	35	
6	Färjestadens GoIF	22	10	5	7	61	44	+17	35	
7	Nässjö FF	22	10	4	8	38	46	−8	34	
8	Sölvesborgs GIF	22	7	4	11	43	48	−5	25	
9	Näsby IF	22	6	7	9	40	53	−13	25	Relegation Playoffs
10	IFK Karlshamn	22	7	3	12	47	54	−7	24	Relegated
11	Högadals IS	22	3	1	18	35	77	−42	10	Relegated
12	Mönsterås GIF	22	2	2	18	27	86	−59	8	Relegated

=== Sydvästra Götaland 2001 ===
Pos	Team	Pld	W	D	L	GF	GA	GD	Pts	Promotion or relegation
1	Askims IK	22	13	5	4	48	29	+19	44	Promoted
2	Varbergs GIF FF	22	12	4	6	39	32	+7	40	Promotion Playoffs
3	Vinbergs IF	22	12	3	7	50	43	+7	39	
4	Markaryds IF	22	11	3	8	43	34	+9	36	
5	Bredaryds IK	22	9	7	6	34	28	+6	34	
6	IS Halmia, Halmstad	22	8	6	8	33	31	+2	30	
7	Smålandsstenars GoIF	22	8	5	9	27	24	+3	29	
8	Skrea IF	22	7	5	10	42	39	+3	26	
9	Sennans IF	22	7	4	11	37	37	0	25	Relegation Playoffs – Relegated
10	Varbergs BoIS FC	22	6	4	12	29	42	−13	22	Relegated
11	Båstads GIF	22	4	9	9	31	50	−19	21	Relegated
12	Klippans BIF	22	6	3	13	26	50	−24	21	Relegated

=== Södra Götaland 2001 ===
Pos	Team	Pld	W	D	L	GF	GA	GD	Pts	Promotion or relegation
1	IFK Hässleholm	22	16	3	3	50	25	+25	51	Promoted
2	Kirseberg IF	22	12	5	5	44	22	+22	41	Promotion Playoffs
3	Asmundtorps IF	22	11	4	7	37	24	+13	37	
4	Kulladals FF	22	8	10	4	37	28	+9	34	
5	BK Olympic, Malmö	22	9	4	9	41	43	−2	31	
6	Bunkeflo IF	22	9	4	9	44	48	−4	31	
7	Oxie IF	22	8	5	9	31	37	−6	29	
8	Perstorps SK	22	8	4	10	31	38	−7	28	
9	Eslövs BK	22	8	3	11	34	43	−9	27	Relegation Playoffs – Relegated
10	Sjöbo IF	22	7	4	11	42	53	−11	25	Relegated
11	Tomelilla IF	22	4	5	13	33	50	−17	17	Relegated
12	Åhus Horna BK	22	3	7	12	30	43	−13	16	Relegated
