= 2000 Division 3 (Swedish football) =

Swedish League Division 3
- Season: 2000
- Champions: IFK Luleå; Umedalens IF; Söderhamns FF; Valsta Syrianska IK; Essinge IK FK; IFK Ölme; Gullringens GoIF; Skärhamns IK; Trollhättans IF; Kalmar AIK; Laholms FK; Ängelholms FF
- Promoted: 12 teams above and: Nyköpings BIS; IFK Värnamo; Höllvikens GIF
- Relegated: 42 teams

Statistics of Swedish football Division 3 for the 2000 season.

== League standings ==
=== Norra Norrland 2000 ===
Pos	Team	Pld	W	D	L	GF	GA	GD	Pts	Promotion or relegation
1	IFK Luleå	22	18	3	1	81	16	+65	57	Promoted
2	Hedens IF, Boden	22	14	6	2	49	31	+18	48	Promotion Playoffs
3	Malmbergets AIF	22	13	4	5	49	24	+25	43	
4	Burträsk IK	22	11	4	7	64	42	+22	37	
5	Gammelstads IF	22	12	1	9	54	44	+10	37	
6	Morön BK	22	10	5	7	42	30	+12	35	
7	Gällivare SK	22	8	5	9	37	43	−6	29	
8	Sunderby SK	22	8	3	11	42	50	−8	27	
9	Haparanda FF	22	6	2	14	36	40	−4	20	Relegation Playoffs
10	Norsjö IF	22	3	7	12	30	55	−25	16	Relegated
11	IFK Kalix	22	4	1	17	25	87	−62	13	Relegated
12	Assi IF, Kalix	22	3	3	16	23	70	−47	12	Relegated

=== Mellersta Norrland 2000 ===
Pos	Team	Pld	W	D	L	GF	GA	GD	Pts	Promotion or relegation
1	Umedalens IF, Umeå	22	14	4	4	57	24	+33	46	Promoted
2	Matfors IF	22	13	5	4	46	20	+26	44	Promotion Playoffs
3	Gimonäs CK	22	12	7	3	52	30	+22	43	
4	Betsele IF	22	10	3	9	40	51	−11	33	
5	Frösö IF	22	9	4	9	43	27	+16	31	
6	Sävar IK	22	10	1	11	39	41	−2	31	
7	Långsele AIF	22	9	4	9	26	31	−5	31	
8	IFK Sundsvall	22	8	5	9	29	28	+1	29	
9	Stockviks FF	22	9	2	11	40	41	−1	29	Relegation Playoffs
10	IF Älgarna, Härnösand	22	7	3	12	27	45	−18	24	Relegated
11	Sund IF, Sundsbruk	22	5	3	14	35	50	−15	18	Relegated
12	Anundsjö IF	22	4	3	15	28	74	−46	15	Relegated

=== Södra Norrland 2000 ===
Pos	Team	Pld	W	D	L	GF	GA	GD	Pts	Promotion or relegation
1	Söderhamns FF	22	13	5	4	43	16	+27	44	Promoted
2	Bollnäs GoIF FF	22	11	5	6	42	32	+10	38	Promotion Playoffs
3	Gestrike-Hammarby IF	22	11	2	9	42	39	+3	35	
4	Edsbyns IF	22	11	2	9	32	31	+1	35	
5	Hudiksvalls ABK	22	10	4	8	42	48	−6	34	
6	Islingby IK	22	9	3	10	38	34	+4	30	
7	Korsnäs IF FK	22	9	3	10	30	33	−3	30	
8	Forssa BK	22	8	6	8	29	32	−3	30	
9	Falu BS	22	9	2	11	27	35	−8	29	Relegation Playoffs
10	Färila IF	22	7	6	9	29	30	−1	27	Relegated
11	Hamrånge GIF	22	6	5	11	32	41	−9	23	Relegated
12	IFK Gävle	22	5	3	14	15	36	−21	18	Relegated

=== Norra Svealand 2000 ===
Pos	Team	Pld	W	D	L	GF	GA	GD	Pts	Promotion or relegation
1	Valsta Syrianska IK, Märsta	22	13	5	4	40	25	+15	44	Promoted
2	Topkapi IK, Stockholm	22	11	4	7	48	33	+15	37	Promotion Playoffs
3	Skiljebo SK, Västerås	22	10	7	5	53	40	+13	37	
4	Håbo FF	22	8	10	4	47	45	+2	34	
5	Gimo IF FK	22	9	6	7	48	42	+6	33	
6	Heby AIF	22	9	5	8	40	35	+5	32	
7	BKV Norrtälje	22	9	4	9	33	45	−12	31	
8	Sandvikens AIK	22	8	5	9	37	44	−7	29	
9	Akropolis IF, Johanneshov	22	7	3	12	38	43	−5	24	Relegation Playoffs -Relegated
10	IFK Österåker FK, Åkersberga	22	5	6	11	38	45	−7	21	Relegated
11	Bälinge IF, Upplands-Bälinge	22	4	8	10	27	36	−9	20	Relegated
12	Arlanda FF	22	4	7	11	25	41	−16	19	Relegated

=== Östra Svealand 2000 ===
Pos	Team	Pld	W	D	L	GF	GA	GD	Pts	Promotion or relegation
1	Essinge IK FK	22	17	3	2	59	22	+37	54	Promoted
2	Nyköpings BIS	22	16	2	4	42	25	+17	50	Promotion Playoffs – Promoted
3	Gustavsbergs IF	22	13	4	5	53	28	+25	43	
4	Huddinge IF	22	11	6	5	46	31	+15	39	
5	Stureby SK	22	9	6	7	37	35	+2	33	
6	IFK Lidingö	22	9	5	8	37	39	−2	32	
7	FoC Farsta	22	8	2	12	32	30	+2	26	
8	Hargs BK, Nyköping	22	8	2	12	34	50	−16	26	
9	Bromstens IK	22	5	7	10	36	47	−11	22	Relegation Playoffs – Relegated
10	Enhörna IF	22	5	5	12	26	42	−16	20	Relegated
11	Fardhem/Garda IK 86 (FG'86)	22	3	6	13	29	48	−19	15	Relegated
12	Enebybergs IK	22	3	2	17	28	62	−34	11	Relegated

=== Västra Svealand 2000 ===
Pos	Team	Pld	W	D	L	GF	GA	GD	Pts	Promotion or relegation
1	IFK Ölme	22	17	4	1	63	17	+46	55	Promoted
2	Carlstad United BK	22	15	3	4	53	21	+32	48	Promotion Playoffs
3	IFK Eskilstuna	22	14	2	6	52	28	+24	44	
4	Säffle FF	22	11	5	6	48	32	+16	38	
5	Ludvika FK	22	10	1	11	45	46	−1	31	
6	Karlslunds IF HFK	22	7	9	6	45	40	+5	30	
7	IK Franke, Västerås	22	7	4	11	40	53	−13	25	
8	Arboga Södra IF	22	7	3	12	41	56	−15	24	
9	Filipstads FF	22	6	4	12	28	47	−19	22	Relegation Playoffs – Relegated
10	Gideonsbergs IF, Västerås	22	5	7	10	27	46	−19	22	Relegated
11	Köping FF	22	4	5	13	24	51	−27	17	Relegated
12	Sköllersta IF	22	4	3	15	30	59	−29	15	Relegated

=== Nordöstra Götaland 2000 ===
Pos	Team	Pld	W	D	L	GF	GA	GD	Pts	Promotion or relegation
1	Gullringens GoIF	22	14	7	1	59	24	+35	49	Promoted
2	LSW IF, Motala	22	12	4	6	52	25	+27	40	Promotion Playoffs
3	Tranås FF	22	10	6	6	40	39	+1	36	
4	Mjölby AI FF	22	11	3	8	34	33	+1	36	
5	Tenhults IF	22	10	5	7	46	36	+10	35	
6	Nässjö FF	22	9	6	7	37	34	+3	33	
7	Mönsterås GIF	22	9	5	8	36	39	−3	32	
8	BK Kenty, Linköping	22	9	4	9	39	34	+5	31	
9	BK Zeros, Motala	22	8	5	9	33	35	−2	29	Relegation Playoffs – Relegated
10	Lindö FF	22	5	6	11	37	41	−4	21	Relegated
11	Västerviks FF	22	1	9	12	25	64	−39	12	Relegated
12	IK Ramunder, Söderköping	22	1	6	15	16	50	−34	9	Relegated

=== Nordvästra Götaland 2000 ===
Pos	Team	Pld	W	D	L	GF	GA	GD	Pts	Promotion or relegation
1	Skärhamns IK	22	14	6	2	54	24	+30	48	Promoted
2	IK Oddevold, Uddevalla	22	14	5	3	66	24	+42	47	Promotion Playoffs
3	Askims IK	22	12	5	5	46	30	+16	41	
4	Skogens IF, Göteborg	22	10	5	7	38	28	+10	35	
5	Lundens AIS, Göteborg	22	10	3	9	49	53	−4	33	
6	Grebbestads IF	22	10	2	10	34	36	−2	32	
7	Vallens IF, Spekeröd	22	7	7	8	41	47	−6	28	
8	IF Väster, V. Frölunda	22	8	4	10	34	45	−11	28	
9	Lerkils IF	22	8	3	11	43	44	−1	27	Relegation Playoffs – Relegated
10	IFK Uddevalla	22	7	3	12	34	47	−13	24	Relegated
11	IFK Fjärås	22	5	4	13	29	41	−12	19	Relegated
12	Lysekils FF	22	2	3	17	15	64	−49	9	Relegated

=== Mellersta Götaland 2000 ===
Pos	Team	Pld	W	D	L	GF	GA	GD	Pts	Promotion or relegation
1	Trollhättans IF	22	13	6	3	49	22	+27	45	Promoted
2	Holmalunds IF	22	12	6	4	37	19	+18	42	Promotion Playoffs
3	Mariedals IK, Borås	22	12	1	9	28	23	+5	37	
4	Jonsereds IF	22	10	6	6	30	21	+9	36	
5	Götene IF	22	8	8	6	43	32	+11	32	
6	Ulvåkers IF	22	9	5	8	42	35	+7	32	
7	IFK Falköping FF	22	9	4	9	40	35	+5	31	
8	Gerdskens BK	22	8	6	8	38	45	−7	30	
9	Vara SK	22	8	5	9	52	44	+8	29	Relegation Playoffs
10	Skara FC	22	8	3	11	24	37	−13	27	Relegated
11	Vänersborgs IF	22	3	4	15	25	57	−32	13	Relegated
12	Trollhättans BoIS	22	3	4	15	27	65	−38	13	Relegated

=== Sydöstra Götaland 2000 ===
Pos	Team	Pld	W	D	L	GF	GA	GD	Pts	Promotion or relegation
1	Kalmar AIK	22	17	2	3	63	21	+42	53	Promoted
2	IFK Karlshamn	22	15	2	5	60	36	+24	47	Promotion Playoffs
3	Växjö Norra IF	22	13	6	3	46	22	+24	45	
4	Västra Torsås IF	22	10	5	7	45	40	+5	35	
5	Perstorps SK	22	10	5	7	41	39	+2	35	
6	Näsby IF	22	10	4	8	51	40	+11	34	
7	Växjö BK	22	9	5	8	43	33	+10	32	
8	Ifö/Bromölla	22	9	4	9	32	31	+1	31	
9	Saxemara IF	22	6	5	11	28	36	−8	23	Relegation Playoffs – Relegated
10	Rödeby AIF	22	6	2	14	28	47	−19	20	Relegated
11	IFK Osby	22	3	4	15	24	44	−20	13	Relegated
12	Olofströms IF	22	0	4	18	11	83	−72	4	Relegated

=== Sydvästra Götaland 2000 ===
Pos	Team	Pld	W	D	L	GF	GA	GD	Pts	Promotion or relegation
1	Laholms FK	22	13	4	5	42	22	+20	43	Promoted
2	IFK Värnamo	22	12	5	5	44	22	+22	41	Promotion Playoffs – Promoted
3	Vinbergs IF	22	12	5	5	52	35	+17	41	
4	Skrea IF	22	10	6	6	43	30	+13	36	
5	Varbergs BoIS FC	22	10	5	7	38	29	+9	35	
6	Smålandsstenars GoIF	22	9	6	7	42	37	+5	33	
7	IS Halmia, Halmstad	22	9	6	7	29	24	+5	33	
8	Varbergs GIF	22	8	8	6	45	40	+5	32	
9	Bredaryds IK	22	10	0	12	35	45	−10	30	Relegation Playoffs
10	Kinna IF	22	8	5	9	36	37	−1	29	Relegated
11	Älmhults IF	22	2	3	17	26	62	−36	9	Relegated
12	Strömsnäsbruks IF	22	1	3	18	13	62	−49	6	Relegated

=== Södra Götaland 2000 ===
Pos	Team	Pld	W	D	L	GF	GA	GD	Pts	Promotion or relegation
1	Ängelholms FF	22	16	5	1	62	13	+49	53	Promoted
2	Höllvikens GIF	22	16	4	2	61	13	+48	52	Promotion Playoffs – Promoted
3	Kirsebergs IF, Malmö	22	11	3	8	51	38	+13	36	
4	Bunkeflo IF	22	11	2	9	47	35	+12	35	
5	Sjöbo IF	22	10	2	10	43	49	−6	32	
6	Tomelilla IF	22	9	4	9	37	39	−2	31	
7	Oxie IF	22	8	5	9	28	32	−4	29	
8	Klippans BIF	22	8	5	9	41	47	−6	29	
9	Eslövs BK	22	8	3	11	46	46	0	27	Relegation Playoffs
10	BK Fram, Landskrona	22	7	3	12	28	42	−14	24	Relegated
11	IFK Simrishamn	22	6	3	13	29	61	−32	21	Relegated
12	Malmö BI	22	2	1	19	22	80	−58	7	Relegated
