= Thomas Gradin =

Swedish ice hockey player

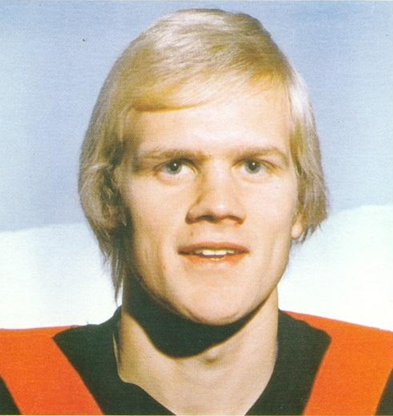
- Born: February 18, 1956 (age 70) Sollefteå, Sweden
- Height: 5 ft 11 in (180 cm)
- Weight: 176 lb (80 kg; 12 st 8 lb)
- Position: Centre
- Shot: Left
- Played for: AIK; Vancouver Canucks; Boston Bruins; Västerås IK
- NHL draft: 45th overall, 1976; Chicago Black Hawks
- WHA draft: 9th overall, 1976; Winnipeg Jets
- Playing career: 1972–1990

Thomas Kjell Gradin (born February 18, 1956) is a Swedish associate head scout for the Vancouver Canucks of the National Hockey League (NHL) and a former professional ice hockey centre who played in the NHL and the Swedish Elite League (SEL) from 1975 to 1990.

Following his rookie season in the SEL, Gradin was selected by the Chicago Black Hawks 45th overall in the 1976 NHL Amateur Draft. After being traded to the Vancouver Canucks in 1978, he moved to North America to begin his NHL career. Over eight seasons in Vancouver, Gradin established himself as the team's all-time leading scorer and competed in the 1982 Stanley Cup Final, as well as the 1985 NHL All-Star Game. After a one-year stint with the Boston Bruins, Gradin returned to Sweden, where he finished off his playing career with his former SEL team, AIK.

In 1994, Gradin returned to the Canucks organization as a scout. His efforts in that capacity has helped the team draft such Swedish players as Daniel Sedin, Henrik Sedin, Mattias Öhlund, and Alexander Edler. Gradin's career with the organization over the years was distinguished by the team with his induction into their Ring of Honour in 2011.

== Playing career ==
=== Sweden ===
Born in Sollefteå, Sweden, Gradin played youth hockey for nearby Långsele AIF. At age 14, he began playing men's hockey for Långsele's Division 3 team. In 1972–73, he transferred to Modo. Gradin played in Sweden's Division 1 league with Modo for three seasons before the team moved up to the Swedish Elite League (SEL) in 1975.

After scoring 16 goals and 39 points in 35 games in the 1975–76 SEL season, Gradin was selected by the Chicago Black Hawks in the third round, 45th overall, of the 1976 NHL Amateur Draft. Unable to come to terms on a contract with Chicago, Gradin remained in Sweden for two more seasons before moving to the NHL. Following his draft, he transferred to AIK in order to accommodate his studies in Stockholm. Playing in his first season with AIK in 1976–77, Gradin scored 16 goals for the second consecutive year. The following campaign, he recorded 37 points, as well as an SEL career-high 22 goals.

=== Vancouver Canucks ===
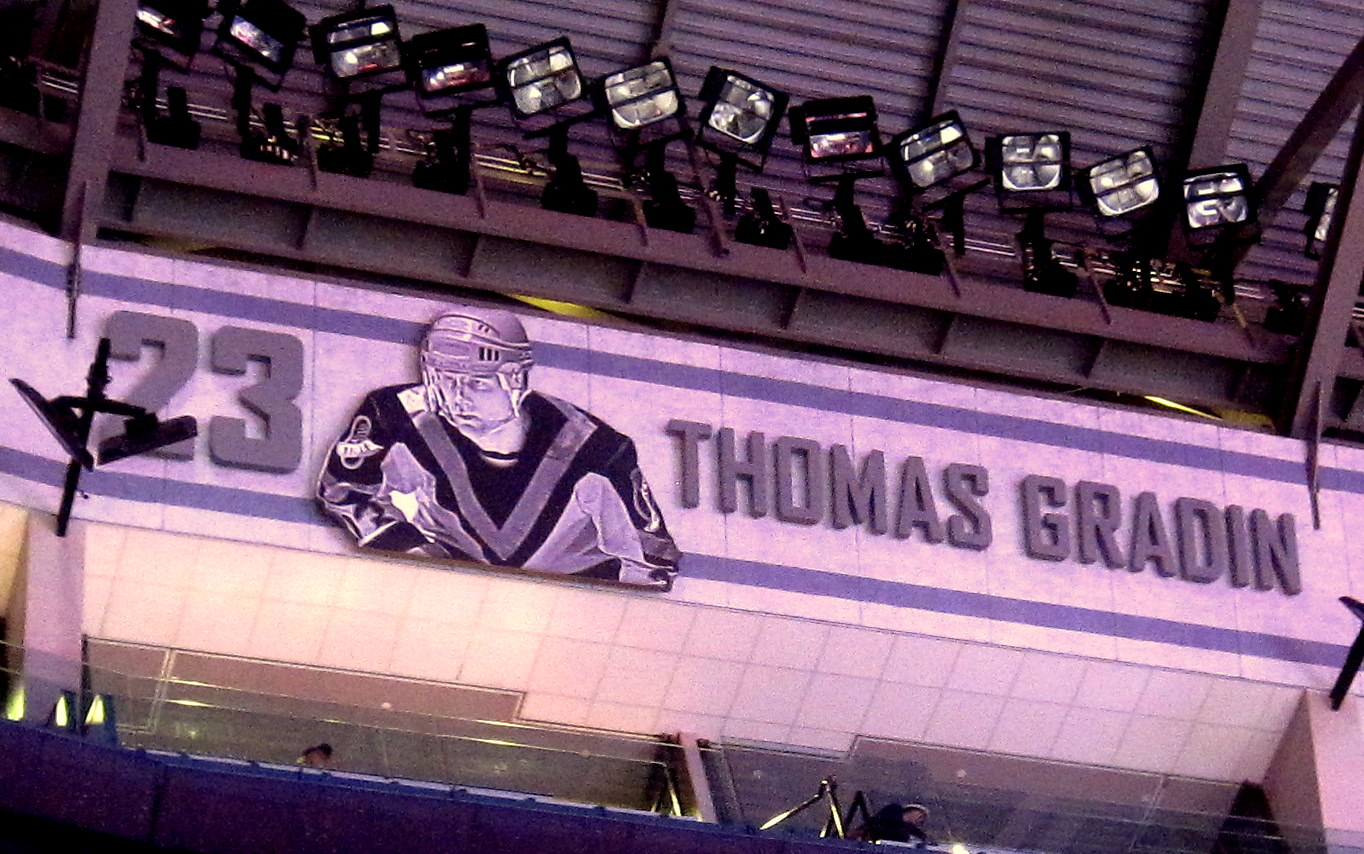
Thomas Gradin's Ring of Honour plaque in Rogers Arena.

In June 1978, the Black Hawks traded Gradin's NHL rights to the Vancouver Canucks in exchange for a draft pick. The deal prompted Gradin to move to the NHL three years after his draft. Along with fellow Swedes Lars Zetterström and Lars Lindgren, the trio became the first Europeans to join the Canucks in team history. Playing on a line with fellow rookies Stan Smyl and Curt Fraser, Gradin led the team in assists (31) and finished second in team-scoring (51 points) in 1978–79. His efforts earned him the Cyclone Taylor Award as team MVP, an honour he shared with goaltender Glen Hanlon.

In ensuing seasons, Gradin established himself as arguably the most skilled player in the franchise's history during his era. He improved to 30 goals and 75 points in 1979–80, ranking second in team-scoring to Smyl's 78 points. With 69 points the following season (21 goals and 48 assists), led the team in scoring for the first time. He repeated the feat in 1981–82 with 86 points, setting a single-season franchise record. The total broke the mark previously set by Smyl two years prior, though Smyl bettered Gradin's mark with an 88-point campaign the following season.

Gradin continued to play a starring role for the team in the 1982 playoffs, leading the Canucks in post-season scoring with 19 points in 17 games. Despite entering the playoffs with a losing record (30 wins, 33 losses and 17 ties), the Canucks went on to their first Stanley Cup Final appearance in franchise history. Playing the two-time defending champion New York Islanders, the Canucks were swept in four games. Gradin's 19 points ranked fourth in league scoring, behind the Islanders trio of Brian Trottier, Mike Bossy and Denis Potvin. It also stood as a Canucks record for 12 years until Pavel Bure scored 31 in 1994.

Continuing to play in the prime of his career, Gradin recorded 86 points for the second straight year in 1982–83. However, he could not help the Canucks build off of the previous year's playoff success, as the team was eliminated in the first round.

During the 1983–84 campaign, Gradin became the Canucks' all-time leading scorer. With his 408th point as a Canuck, he passed former teammate Don Lever, who had left the Canucks in 1980. With 21 goals and a career-high 57 assists, he finished with 78 points on the year. During the 1984–85 season, Gradin earned his first and only appearance in the NHL All-Star Game. He finished the campaign with 64 points, including his seventh consecutive 20-goal season.

In 1985–86, Gradin was supplanted on the team's top line by countryman Patrik Sundström. Playing on the second line, his single-season points total declined to a career-low 41 points (14 goals and 27 assists). During the off-season, Gradin became a free agent. While the Canucks acquired another centre in Barry Pederson, Gradin opted to sign with the Boston Bruins. He left the team with an all-time leading 550 points (197 goals and 353 assists) over 613 games as a Canuck. His tenure as the franchise's scoring leader was short-lived, as longtime teammate Smyl surpassed his career mark during the ensuing season. Meanwhile, Gradin's mark of 38 points in 38 playoff games as a Canuck stood for seven years until Trevor Linden surpassed it in 1993. His career as a Canuck (including many years as a scout with the organization in subsequent years) was distinguished several decades later when he was inducted into the team's Ring of Honour in 2011. He received the honour during a pre-game ceremony on January 24.

=== Boston Bruins and return to Sweden ===
Playing with the Bruins, Gradin recorded 12 goals and 43 points over 64 games in 1986–87. The season marked his last in the NHL, as Gradin chose to return to his native Sweden for the 1987–88 campaign.

Resuming his career with AIK in 1987–88, Gradin recorded 33 points (15 goals and 18 assists) in 38 games, approaching his offensive totals from his early career in Sweden. He went on to record 32- and 29-point campaigns in the following two years before retiring from professional hockey at age 34.

== International career ==
Gradin's most notable contribution internationally came at the 1984 Canada Cup, where he captained Sweden's entry and led them to the finals before losing to Canada. He would also represent Sweden at the 1981 Canada Cup, where Sweden finished fifth. He only took part in one World Championships, in 1978.

Gradin also starred for Sweden at the 1974, 1975 and 1976 World Junior Championships, helping them to a bronze medal in 1975.

== Scouting career ==
Four years after his retirement as a player, Gradin returned to the Vancouver Canucks organization as an amateur scout prior to the 1994–95 NHL season. After four years in that role, he was promoted to Head of European Scouting in 1998, a position he held until 2007. During that time, he played a key role in the Canucks drafting Daniel and Henrik (1999), Mattias Öhlund and Alexander Edler.

The latter was a relatively unknown player competing in Sweden's third division (only he and Red Wings scout Håkan Andersson had scouted him). Gradin was instrumental in convincing Vancouver management to trade up in the 2004 draft to select Edler in the third round.

Following his tenure as head European scout, he was named associated head scout in 2007.

== Personal life ==
Peter Gradin, Thomas' younger brother, was also a star hockey player in Sweden throughout the 1980s although he was never drafted by an NHL team.

In September 2013, Thomas Gradin was appointed Honorary Consul at the Swedish Consulate in Vancouver.

== Awards and achievements ==
- Vancouver Canucks Ring of Honour (2011)
- Played in NHL All-Star Game (1985)
- Vancouver Canucks' leading scorer (1980–81, 1981–82)
- Vancouver Canucks' leading playoff scorer (1979, 1981, 1982, 1986)
- Vancouver Canucks' goals leader (1981–82)
- Vancouver Canucks' assists leader (1978–79, 1980–81 – 1983–84)
- Viking Award winner (Best Swede in NHL – 1982)
- Canucks' Molson Cup winner (1982–83)
- Vancouver Canucks' MVP (1978–79)

== Career statistics ==
=== Regular season and playoffs ===
			Regular season					Playoffs
Season	Team	League	GP	G	A	Pts	PIM	GP	G	A	Pts	PIM
1970–71	Långsele AIF	SWE III	14	11	2	13	—	—	—	—	—	—
1971–72	Modo AIK	SWE	—	—	—	—	—	—	—	—	—	—
1972–73	Modo AIK	SWE	11	5	1	6	4	6	3	1	4	2
1973–74	Modo AIK	SWE	14	4	4	8	2	13	5	8	13	2
1974–75	Modo AIK	SWE	29	16	15	31	16	—	—	—	—	—
1975–76	Modo AIK	SEL	35	16	23	39	23	—	—	—	—	—
1976–77	AIK	SEL	36	16	12	28	8	—	—	—	—	—
1977–78	AIK	SEL	36	22	15	37	22	6	0	5	5	14
1978–79	Vancouver Canucks	NHL	76	20	31	51	22	3	4	1	5	4
1979–80	Vancouver Canucks	NHL	80	30	45	75	22	4	0	2	2	0
1980–81	Vancouver Canucks	NHL	79	21	48	69	34	3	1	3	4	0
1981–82	Vancouver Canucks	NHL	76	37	49	86	32	17	9	10	19	10
1982–83	Vancouver Canucks	NHL	80	32	54	86	61	4	1	3	4	2
1983–84	Vancouver Canucks	NHL	75	21	57	78	32	4	0	1	1	2
1984–85	Vancouver Canucks	NHL	76	22	42	64	43	—	—	—	—	—
1985–86	Vancouver Canucks	NHL	71	14	27	41	34	3	2	1	3	2
1986–87	Boston Bruins	NHL	64	12	31	43	18	4	0	4	4	0
1987–88	AIK	SEL	38	15	18	33	14	5	1	1	2	2
1988–89	AIK	SEL	33	11	21	32	40	2	0	1	1	2
1989–90	AIK	SEL	35	14	15	29	14	3	2	0	2	2
1996–97	Västerås IK	SEL	2	0	1	1	0	—	—	—	—	—
SWE totals			54	25	20	45	22	19	8	9	17	4
SEL totals			215	94	105	199	121	16	3	7	10	20
NHL totals			677	209	384	593	298	42	17	25	42	20

=== International ===
Year	Team	Event	GP	G	A	Pts	PIM
1973	Sweden	EJC	5	2	1	3	2
1974	Sweden	WJC	5	3	3	6	2
1974	Sweden	EJC	5	5	5	10	2
1975	Sweden	EJC	5	4	4	8	0
1976	Sweden	WJC	4	3	1	4	2
1978	Sweden	WC	9	2	1	3	0
1981	Sweden	CC	5	1	2	3	4
1984	Sweden	CC	8	2	2	4	6
Junior totals			24	17	14	31	8
Senior totals			22	5	5	10	10

Preceded by Brad Gassoff	Winnipeg Jets first-round draft pick 1976	Succeeded by Ron Duguay
