= Elias Pettersson =

Swedish ice hockey player (born 1998)

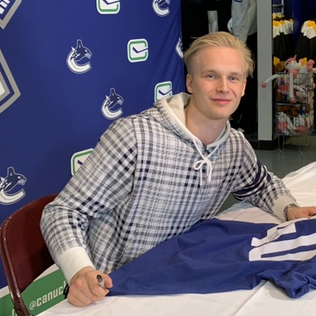
- Pettersson in 2019
- Born: 12 November 1998 (age 27) Sundsvall, Sweden
- Height: 6 ft 2 in (188 cm)
- Weight: 176 lb (80 kg; 12 st 8 lb)
- Position: Forward
- Shoots: Left
- NHL team Former teams: Vancouver Canucks; Timrå IK,Växjö Lakers
- National team: Sweden
- NHL draft: 5th overall, 2017; Vancouver Canucks
- Playing career: 2015–present

Fredrik Elias Pettersson (born 12 November 1998) is a Swedish professional ice hockey player who is a forward and alternate captain for the Vancouver Canucks of the National Hockey League (NHL). Pettersson was selected fifth overall by the Canucks in the 2017 NHL entry draft. He was born in Sundsvall, Sweden, but grew up in Ånge. After one of the greatest under-20 seasons in Swedish Hockey League (SHL) history in 2017–18, and winning the Le Mat Trophy with the Växjö Lakers, Pettersson made the Canucks' opening night roster for the 2018–19 season. He won the Calder Memorial Trophy as the league's best rookie in 2018–19, becoming the second Canuck to do so after Pavel Bure in 1991–92.

== Early life ==
Fredrik Elias Pettersson was born on 12 November 1998, in Sundsvall, Sweden, to Irene Jonsson and Torbjörn Pettersson. According to Pettersson and his older brother Emil, the name "Fredrik" was likely chosen by Emil in honour of Ånge IK forward Fredrik Lindberg. Pettersson is of Finnish descent through his paternal grandfather, born Toivo Jokelainen, who was sent to Sweden in 1941 as a Finnish war child.

Raised in Ånge, Pettersson began playing hockey at three years old. He and his brother Emil played for Ånge IK's youth team. Because Ånge has few teams and his father was Zamboni driver at the local rink, Pettersson had opportunities for extra ice time in his youth. He also played soccer, but stopped when he was 13 years old to focus on hockey.

In 2011, when he was 13 years old, Pettersson found out that two of his best friends, Valerik and Davit Danielyan, were deported from Sweden to Armenia. Along with some friends, Pettersson was interviewed by a local newspaper and television station in support of the Danielyan family. The Danielyans were permitted to return to Sweden in 2012, following about 80 days in Armenia. Pettersson discussed the events in 2019 and 2020 interviews.

In the 2013–14 season, when he was in grade eight, Pettersson began playing for the nearby Timrå IK's U15 squad because Ånge did not have a junior team. In his first two seasons with Timrå, Pettersson lived in Ånge and commuted about 100 kilometres (62 mi) to practice multiple times per week. Eventually, Pettersson moved to Tallnäs, which was closer to Timrå.

== Playing career ==
=== Timrå IK (2015–2017) ===
In the 2015–16 season, Pettersson made his professional debut with Timrå IK of HockeyAllsvenskan, Sweden's second-highest professional league. His debut was delayed due to a knee injury. As an elite player, it was considered unusual for Pettersson to join Timrå instead of a team in the Swedish Hockey League (SHL). In his second season, Pettersson placed second on the team in scoring with 41 points in 43 games. Unable to help Timrå IK gain promotion, Pettersson signed a three-year contract with the Växjö Lakers of the top tier SHL, on 6 April 2017.

=== 2017 NHL entry draft ===
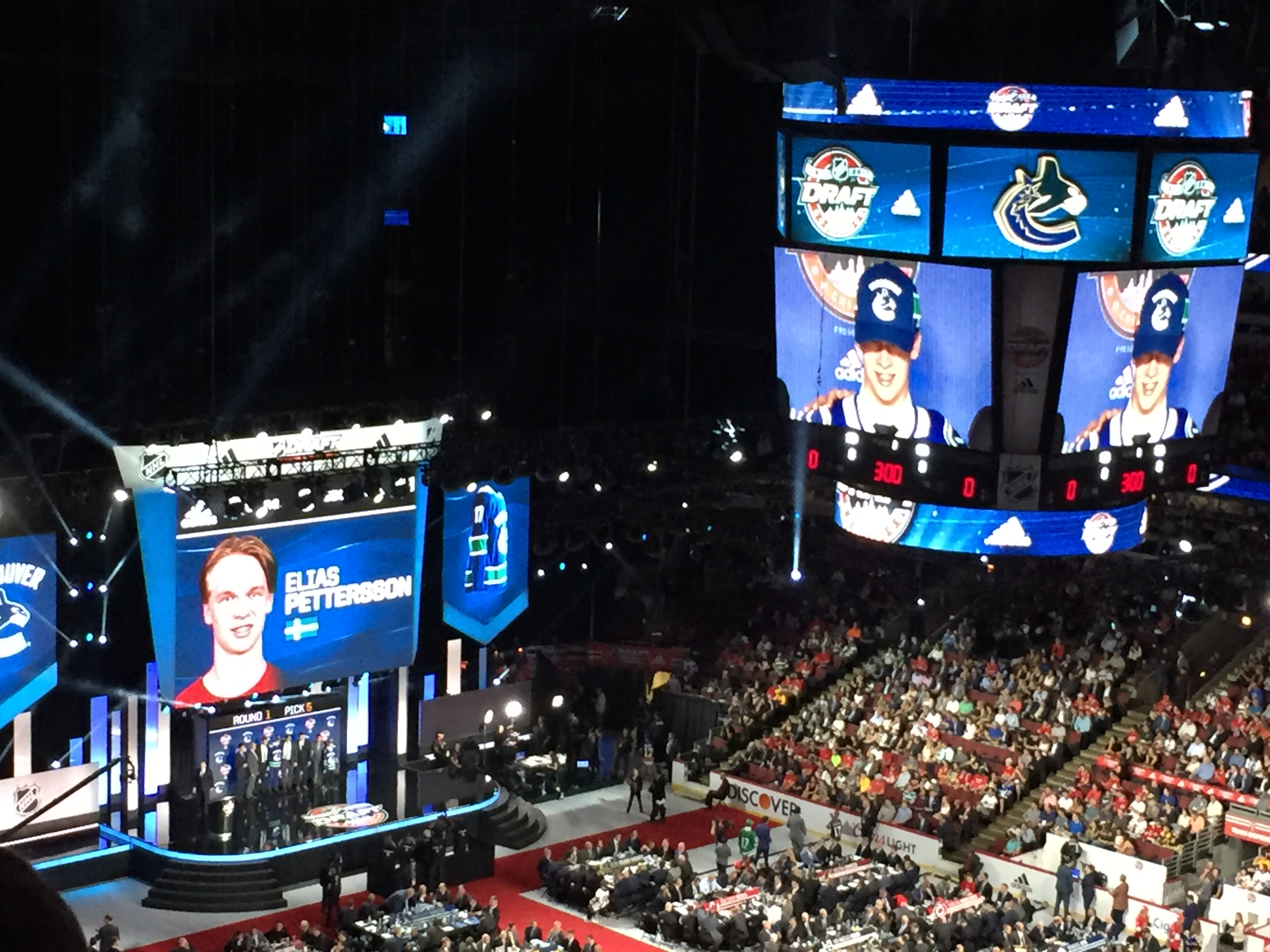
Pettersson selected by the Canucks at the 2017 NHL entry draft.

Pettersson was ranked second among European skaters by the NHL Central Scouting Bureau in his first year of eligibility for the 2017 NHL entry draft. He was selected as the first Swedish player taken in the draft, fifth overall, by the Vancouver Canucks, joining former linemate and Canucks prospect Jonathan Dahlén on 23 June 2017. It was speculated the Canucks drafted Pettersson based partly on highly successful chemistry with Dahlén on the top line for Timrå IK, where they finished fifth and ninth in league scoring as teenagers. The two scored on the first shift they ever played together in Sweden.

=== Växjö Lakers (2017–2018) ===
While still a junior player, Pettersson dominated the Swedish Hockey League (SHL) in his 2017–18 rookie season. In 44 games played, he led the league in both points scored and in +/− at the end of the regular season, with 56 points and +27 respectively. He also scored 24 goals, second in the league behind Frölunda's Victor Olofsson. In the penultimate game of the 2017–18 season, Pettersson recorded four points to reach 55 points for the season. In the season final regular season game, Pettersson set a new record for most points by a junior in a single SHL season (56), previously set by Kent Nilsson in 1975–76.

Pettersson went on to lead the playoffs in both goal-scoring, points, and +/−, with 10 goals, 19 points, and +17 in 13 games played. Scoring four game-winning goals, he led Växjö Lakers to the team's second Le Mat Trophy. In the regular season and the playoffs combined, Pettersson scored 34 goals and 41 assists, for a total of 75 points in 57 games played. In April 2018, Pettersson was awarded the Stefan Liv Memorial Trophy as the SHL playoffs' MVP. All 14 jury members voted unanimously for Pettersson for the first time in the award's nine-year history. At the SHL Awards, Pettersson was named Rookie of the Year and Forward of the Year. While playing in the SHL, Pettersson acquired several nicknames, including "Alien", a nickname that also took hold in Vancouver.

=== Vancouver Canucks (2018–present) ===
On 25 May 2018, the Canucks signed Pettersson to a three-year entry-level contract. On 3 October 2018, Pettersson made his NHL debut against the Calgary Flames. Pettersson scored his first career goal against goaltender Mike Smith, and also recorded an assist in a 5–2 Canucks win. On 13 October 2018, during a game against the Florida Panthers, Pettersson suffered a head injury on a hit from Panthers defenceman Mike Matheson resulting in Pettersson leaving the game. Although Matheson was not penalized for the hit, the NHL Department of Player Safety believed that Matheson had an intent to injure, resulting in him being suspended for two games and fined $52,419.36. Pettersson returned to the lineup on 27 October after missing six games; the Canucks lost 5–0 to the Pittsburgh Penguins. Two nights later, Pettersson scored two goals in a 5–2 win over the Minnesota Wild. On 1 November, Pettersson was named the October Rookie of the Month, and four days later was the Second Star of the Week. In December, he was named First Star of the Week on 10 December and after recording 17 points in 14 games during the month, he was again named Rookie of the Month. On 2 December 2019, Pettersson would win the hardest shot competition at the Canucks Skills Competition with a 99.4 mph slap shot. On 2 January 2019, Pettersson was named to his first NHL All-Star Game as the Canucks' lone representative. He notched his first NHL hat trick later that night in a 4–3 win over the Ottawa Senators, striking in the second and third periods before scoring the game-winning goal in overtime. Pettersson suffered a knee injury a night later when fellow rookie Jesperi Kotkaniemi appeared to hook him away from the play. Petterson went down clutching his right knee and play had to be halted by the referees but he was able to skate off under his power. In his first game back from injury on 21 January 2019, Pettersson scored a goal and recorded an assist in a 3–2 win against the Detroit Red Wings. On 18 March, Pettersson earned an assist in a 3–2 overtime victory over the Chicago Blackhawks for his 61st point, surpassing the Canucks franchise record for points by a rookie which was previously held by Pavel Bure and Ivan Hlinka. In his rookie season, Pettersson totaled 28 goals and 38 assists, giving him 66 points in 71 games. After the season, Pettersson was named as a finalist for the Calder Memorial Trophy, an award he ultimately won at the 2019 NHL Awards in Las Vegas on 19 June 2019, becoming the second Canuck to do so after Pavel Bure.

Early in the 2019–20 season, Pettersson and Brock Boeser formed instant chemistry with off-season acquisition J. T. Miller. On 4 November 2019, Pettersson was named First Star of the Week after totaling 9 points over four games. On 30 December 2019, Pettersson was named to his second consecutive NHL All-Star Game to be played in a month, and was later joined by teammates Jacob Markstrom and Quinn Hughes. At the Hardest Shot Competition, despite Pettersson being the only forward and only player under 200 pounds (91 kg) in the contest, he achieved a 102.4 mph slap shot, the 2nd highest mark by a forward in the competition's history up until that point. On 12 March 2020, the Pettersson's season was cut short by the NHL's season suspension, meaning he was unable to surpass the 66 point mark of his rookie season, which he had matched in fewer games that season. When the season resumed on 1 August 2020, Pettersson would put up 7 goals and 11 assists for 18 points in 17 games as the Canucks would dispatch the Minnesota Wild and St. Louis Blues in 4 and 6 games, respectively, the team's first playoff series wins since 2011. They would make it as far as Game 7 of the second round against the Pacific Division-leading Vegas Golden Knights before bowing out. Pettersson's 18 points in his first playoffs were tied for the team-lead and the eighth highest scoring playoffs in Canucks playoff history.

Pettersson began the shortened 2020–21 season with the worst start of his career, posting just one goal and one assist in his first eight games, as the Canucks struggled out of the gate. However, Pettersson would find his game from then on, recording 19 points in his next 18 games, including five multi-point efforts. Unfortunately, Pettersson sustained a serious upper-body injury on 2 March that sidelined him for the rest of the regular season.

On 1 October 2021, Pettersson signed a three-year, $22.05 million contract with the Canucks. On 22 December, in the Canucks' 6–5 shootout win against the Seattle Kraken, Pettersson recorded fourth NHL career five-point game, and passed Alexander Mogilny for most five-point games in Canucks history. Pettersson finished the 2021–22 regular season with a career-high 32 goals and 68 points in 80 games.

In the 2022–23 season, Pettersson achieved new career highs, totaling 39 goals, 63 assists, and 102 points in 80 games. The Canucks failed to qualify for the playoffs for the third consecutive season, finishing 6th in the Pacific Division and 22nd in the NHL.

On 2 March 2024, Pettersson signed an eight-year, $92.8 million contract extension with the Canucks.

Following the Canucks' elimination from the 2024 Stanley Cup playoffs, Pettersson revealed that he had been playing through a knee injury since January that had continued to affect his playing ability through the postseason. Pettersson recorded only one goal and 6 points through 13 playoff games. Interestingly, the purported time of this injury also aligns with a gradual decline in Pettersson's point production following the month of January. Following the conclusion of the 2024–25 season, Pettersson confirmed that the knee injury had also prevented him from properly training in the offseason.

The 2024–25 season for Pettersson was mired with inconsistency, injury absence, and drama. Despite a strong defensive game and sporadic flashes of his offensive talent, Pettersson struggled to find consistent production throughout the course of the season, recording a career-worst 15 goals and 30 assists for 45 points in 64 games. With high expectations coming into the season following a disappointing playoff performance and the Canucks expected to be in contention for a playoff spot, Pettersson was subject to numerous trade rumours and became a scapegoat among Canucks fans for the teams' poor performance during the regular season due to his underwhelming play and his disproportionately rich contract extension.

Rumours of a feud between Pettersson and teammate J. T. Miller began to circulate in late November 2024. The rumours came following Miller taking an indefinite leave of absence from the team for personal reasons, following a 5–3 loss to the Nashville Predators on 17 November. Pettersson had previously been involved in an altercation with Miller during a practice session. Both Pettersson and Miller vehemently denied all rumours of a "rift in the locker room" when asked by media in December 2024, but the apparent feud was ultimately confirmed by Canucks president Jim Rutherford, who would go on to say that there was "no good solution [that would keep Pettersson and Miller in Vancouver]."

Miller would eventually be traded to the New York Rangers on 31 January 2025. However, Pettersson's play did not improve following Miller's departure, which drew significant attention from media as the Canucks continued to struggle, and soon rumours began of Pettersson also being moved. Public discontent with Pettersson's performance came to a head on 21 February, following a 2–1 loss to the Utah Hockey Club. During the game, Pettersson did not record a shot on goal and had missed on a breakaway chance that would have tied the game in the third period. In the post-game interview, Pettersson was asked about his confidence and scoring difficulties; in response, Pettersson said, "It's more annoying dealing with the media", which drew backlash from both fans and the media. This comment would later be walked back in an interview on 4 March as Pettersson addressed his struggles during the season. Following this interview, Pettersson's play saw a significant improvement towards the end of the season, recording four goals and 10 points in an eight-game span from 7 March to 20 March before suffering a season-ending oblique injury on 22 March in a game against the New York Rangers.

== International play ==
Medal record

Men's ice hockey

Representing Sweden

World Championships
Gold medal – first place	2018 Denmark	

World Junior Championships
Silver medal – second place	2018 Buffalo	

Pettersson competed for Sweden in the 2018 World Junior Championships, winning silver. Despite being limited to just five games, due to a broken thumb, Pettersson would go on to win a gold medal with Sweden at the 2018 World Championship.

On 9 May 2019, Pettersson was included on the roster to return for a second successive tournament with Sweden at the 2019 World Championship.

== Personal life ==
On 7 August 2019, Pettersson was named the cover athlete for the Swedish edition of EA Sports' ice hockey video game NHL 20. In the offseason, Pettersson lives in Stockholm. In 2023, Pettersson was defrauded by a real estate agent in Sweden. The broker in the deal has since been sentenced to six years in jail and charged with fraud. In the summer of 2025, Pettersson married American model and social media influencer Katelyn Byrd.

== Career statistics ==
=== Regular season and playoffs ===
			Regular season					Playoffs
Season	Team	League	GP	G	A	Pts	PIM	GP	G	A	Pts	PIM
2014–15	Timrå IK	J18	40	31	34	65	8	8	5	9	14	4
2014–15	Timrå IK	J20	6	4	9	13	2	1	1	1	2	0
2015–16	Timrå IK	J20	22	6	8	14	20	—	—	—	—	—
2015–16	Timrå IK	Allsv	25	3	6	9	0	5	0	4	4	2
2016–17	Timrå IK	Allsv	43	19	21	40	14	3	2	4	6	0
2016–17	Timrå IK	J20	—	—	—	—	—	2	0	1	1	2
2017–18	Växjö Lakers	SHL	44	24	32	56	14	13	10	9	19	4
2018–19	Vancouver Canucks	NHL	71	28	38	66	12	—	—	—	—	—
2019–20	Vancouver Canucks	NHL	68	27	39	66	18	17	7	11	18	2
2020–21	Vancouver Canucks	NHL	26	10	11	21	6	—	—	—	—	—
2021–22	Vancouver Canucks	NHL	80	32	36	68	12	—	—	—	—	—
2022–23	Vancouver Canucks	NHL	80	39	63	102	14	—	—	—	—	—
2023–24	Vancouver Canucks	NHL	82	34	55	89	12	13	1	5	6	2
2024–25	Vancouver Canucks	NHL	64	15	30	45	14	—	—	—	—	—
2025–26	Vancouver Canucks	NHL	74	15	36	51	20	—	—	—	—	—
SHL totals			44	24	32	56	14	13	10	9	19	4
NHL totals			545	200	308	508	108	30	8	16	24	4

=== International ===
Year	Team	Event	Result	GP	G	A	Pts	PIM
2015	Sweden	IH18	2nd place, silver medalist(s)	5	0	0	0	0
2016	Sweden	U18	2nd place, silver medalist(s)	7	1	7	8	4
2017	Sweden	WJC	4th	6	0	1	1	0
2018	Sweden	WJC	2nd place, silver medalist(s)	7	5	2	7	0
2018	Sweden	WC	1st place, gold medalist(s)	5	1	2	3	0
2019	Sweden	WC	5th	8	3	7	10	2
2025	Sweden	4NF	3rd	3	0	0	0	0
2026	Sweden	OG	7th	5	2	0	2	0
Junior totals				25	6	10	16	4
Senior totals				21	6	9	15	2

== Awards and honours ==
Award	Year	Ref
SHL
Stefan Liv Memorial Trophy	2018	
Rookie of the Year	2018	
Le Mat Trophy champion	2018	
NHL
NHL All-Star Game	2019, 2020, 2023, 2024	
Calder Memorial Trophy	2019	
NHL All-Rookie Team	2019	
Vancouver Canucks
Cyrus H. McLean Trophy	2019, 2023	
Pavel Bure Most Exciting Player Award	2019, 2020	
Three Stars Award	2023	
Cyclone Taylor Trophy	2023	

Awards and achievements
Preceded by Olli Juolevi	Vancouver Canucks first-round draft pick 2017	Succeeded by Quinn Hughes
Preceded by Andreas Borgman	Winner of the SHL Rookie of the Year award 2018	Succeeded by Emil Bemström
Preceded by Mathew Barzal	Winner of the Calder Trophy; 2019	Succeeded by Cale Makar
