= Vancouver Canucks Ring of Honour =

In-arena displays in Vancouver, Canada

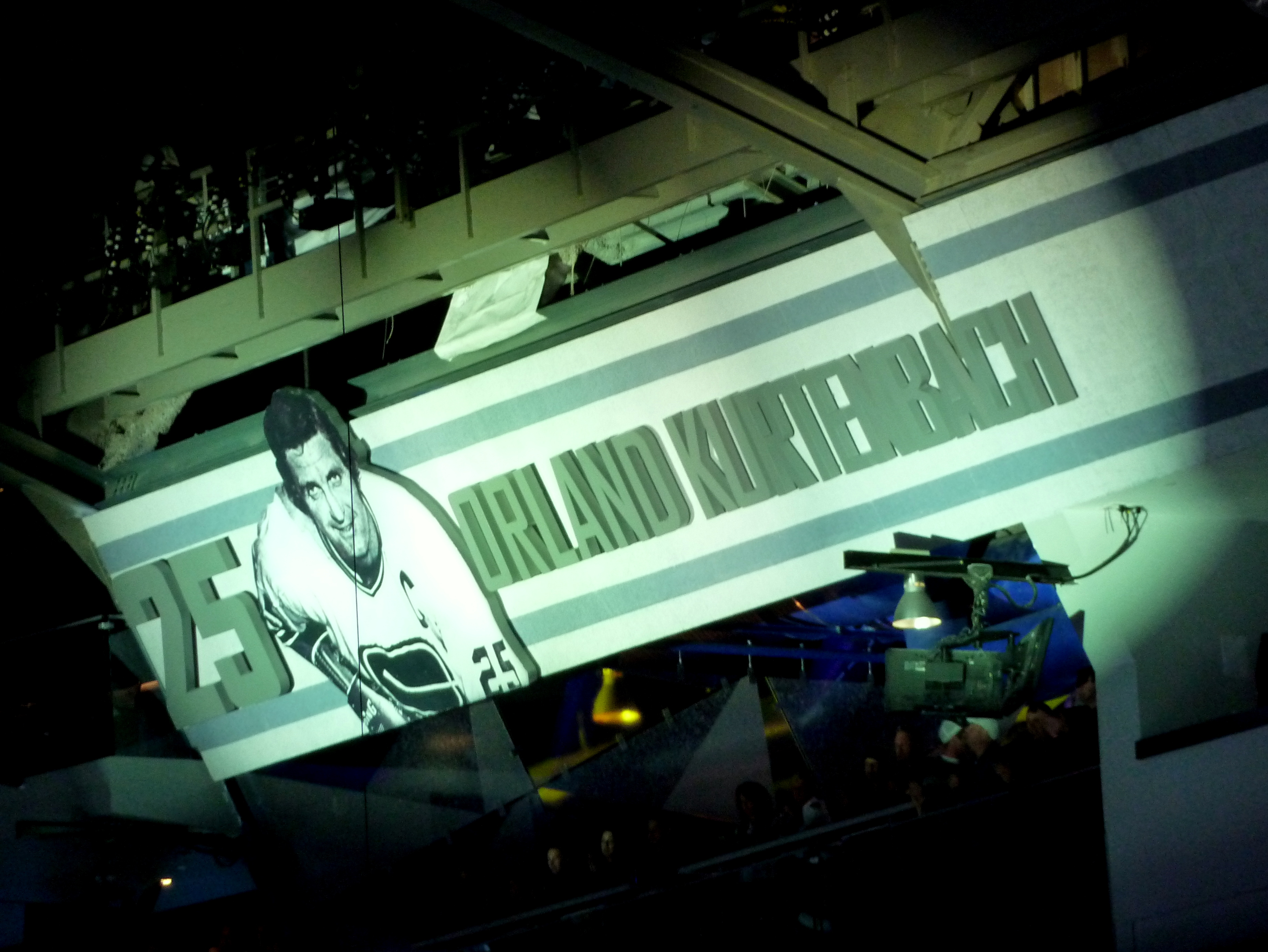
Orland Kurtenbach's plaque on the Canucks' Ring of Honour in Rogers Arena.

The Vancouver Canucks Ring of Honour is a collection of permanent in-arena displays, used as a means to celebrate and acknowledge players who made a lasting impact on the franchise. Along with the permanent display each inductee is given a night of recognition, during the unveiling of their display, that includes a video tribute and an on-ice presentation. Established as part of the Canucks' 40th season celebration in the National Hockey League (NHL) in 2010–11, four members were inducted in the first year. Members are selected by an advisory committee that includes former players, broadcasters, and staff members.

The first member inducted to the Ring of Honour was Orland Kurtenbach. Kurtenbach began his professional career with the Western Hockey League version of the Canucks before reaching the NHL ranks. When the Canucks became an NHL expansion team in 1970, they used their second pick in the expansion draft to take Kurtenbach. Recognized for his leadership Kurtenbach was named the Canucks' first captain, a position he held until retiring in 1974.

The initiative has been well received by both players and fans. Honoured players have garnered loud ovations, while third inductee, Thomas Gradin, called it an honour that he was very proud of.

== Members ==
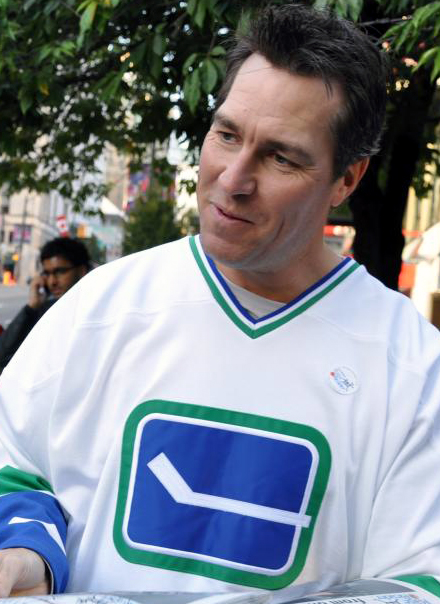
Kirk McLean was the second person inducted into the Ring of Honour

| Number | Name | Position | Years With Club | Date of Induction | Notes | Ref |
|---|---|---|---|---|---|---|
| 25 | Orland Kurtenbach | Centre; Head coach | 1970–1974 (player); 1976–1978 (coach) | October 26, 2010 | First captain in franchise history. Later coached team. | |
| 1 | Kirk McLean | Goaltender | 1987–1998 | November 24, 2010 | Franchise leader in several goaltending statistics.^{a} | |
| 23 | Thomas Gradin | Centre; Scout | 1978–1986 (player); 1994–present (scout) | January 24, 2011 | Former highest-scoring centre in franchise history.^{b} | |
| 27 | Harold Snepsts | Defenceman | 1974–1984; 1987–1990 | March 14, 2011 | Former franchise leader in games played and penalty minutes.^{c} | |
| 3 | Pat Quinn | Defenceman; Head coach General manager President | 1970–1972 (player); 1987–1997 (management) | April 13, 2014 | Won the Jack Adams Award in 1991–92. Head coach and general manager of the 1994 Stanley Cup Finalist team. | |
| 2 | Mattias Ohlund | Defenceman | 1997–2009 | December 16, 2016 | Former highest-scoring defenceman in franchise history. | |
| 14 | Alex Burrows | Left wing | 2006–2017 | December 3, 2019 | Scored numerous game-winning goals, Sedin twins linemate, dubbed 'Dragonslayer" | |
| 1 | Roberto Luongo | Goaltender | 2006–2014 | December 14, 2023 | All time franchise leader in wins (252), save percentage (0.919), and goals-against average (2.36). | |

=== Notes ===
- a: McLean was the Canucks' all-time leader in games played, wins, and shutouts in the regular season and post season at the time of his retirement. Roberto Luongo has since surpassed McLean in wins and shutouts for regular season play.
- b: Gradin finished his Canucks career with 550 points, he has since been surpassed by several players.
- c: Snepsts finished his Canucks career with 781 games played and 1,446 penalty minutes, he has since been surpassed by multiple players in each category.

== See also ==
- List of Vancouver Canucks award winners
