= Harold Snepsts =

Canadian ice hockey player

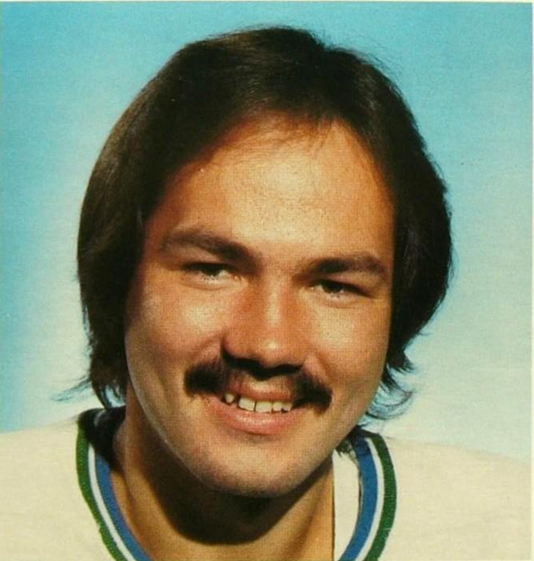
- Born: October 24, 1954 (age 71) Edmonton, Alberta, Canada
- Height: 6 ft 3 in (191 cm)
- Weight: 210 lb (95 kg; 15 st 0 lb)
- Position: Defence
- Shot: Left
- Played for: Vancouver Canucks; Minnesota North Stars; Detroit Red Wings; St. Louis Blues
- NHL draft: 59th overall, 1974; Vancouver Canucks
- WHA draft: 105th overall, 1974; Indianapolis Racers
- Playing career: 1974–1991

Harold John Snepsts (Latvian: Harolds Džons Šnepsts, born October 24, 1954) is a Canadian former professional ice hockey player who spent 17 seasons in the National Hockey League between 1975 and 1991, including two stints with the Vancouver Canucks. Snepsts featured in the 1982 Stanley Cup Finals with the Canucks.

Snepsts was born in Edmonton, Alberta and both of his parents came from Latvia. He is one of the most popular players in the history of the Canucks, the club where he spent the majority of his career.

== Playing career ==
A "stay-at-home defender", Snepsts played his junior hockey for the Edmonton Oil Kings and was selected 59th overall by the Vancouver Canucks in the 1974 NHL amateur draft. He made a strong impression during his first training camp, and appeared in 27 games for the Canucks in 1974–75, recording his first NHL goal. In 1975–76, he became a regular for the Canucks, appearing in 78 games and recording three goals and 18 points. He quickly became a fan favourite for his hard-working, effective, blue-collar defensive game as well as his likeable personality and large moustache.

Through the late 1970s and early 1980s, Snepsts was Vancouver's most effective defender. His physical style of play and very low rate of errors saw him selected to the NHL All-Star Game in 1977 and 1982, and he was named the club's top defender four times in five years between 1977 and 1982. He also showed improvement offensively, scoring a career-high 31 points in 1978–79, and on February 2, 1980 became the first defender in club history to score on a penalty shot.

Throughout this period, the Canucks were one of the weaker franchises in the NHL. However, they caught fire late in the 1981–82 season and went on an extended playoff run, reaching the Stanley Cup Finals. Snepsts, along with goalie Richard Brodeur, was the heart and soul of the team defensively and was a tower of strength during the playoff run, but he committed a terrible turnover in overtime of the first game of the finals against the New York Islanders, which led to a winning goal by Mike Bossy, and the Islanders swept the Canucks in four games.

The 1982–83 season would be a disaster for Snepsts, as he missed 30 games due to a number of injuries, and was also suspended five games for fighting Doug Risebrough under the stands at the Pacific Coliseum. He would have a better year in 1983–84, but at the end of the season was a victim of General Manager Harry Neale's youth movement on the blueline and, in a highly unpopular move, was dealt to the Minnesota North Stars. He left Vancouver as the club's all-time leader in games played and penalty minutes, although Stan Smyl would break those records a few years later.

Snepsts never really found his game in Minnesota and lasted only a season with the North Stars. It was the worst offensive season of his career, as he failed to score a goal and recorded seven assists, although he did set a career high with 232 penalty minutes. He was also suspended for two games for actions in a game against the Detroit Red Wings. Let go by Minnesota, Snepsts signed as a free agent with the Detroit Red Wings. However, his time in Detroit would be plagued with injury. Knee problems limited him to just 35 games in 1985–86, and he failed to score a goal for the second consecutive year. In 1986–87, he was having his best campaign in years for a rejuvenated Detroit team until he injured his shoulder in February, and then re-injured it during the playoffs. The resulting off-season surgery forced him to miss the first half of the 1987–88 season, although he returned to help the Wings reach the Campbell Conference finals for the second consecutive year.

The 1988–89 season would be a homecoming for Snepsts, as he signed a free-agent contract with the Canucks and returned to Vancouver. Now a depth defender, he was a steadying influence as the team set a club record for fewest goals against. That year Canucks fans began to chant "Har-Old!" from the stands, something that will follow him for the rest of his career and sometimes shouted to later players such as Harold Druken. Late in the 1989–90 season he was dealt to the St. Louis Blues to add experience for the playoffs. He played out his final season with the Blues, during which he played in his 1000th NHL game, before retiring in 1991. He was one of the last players to play in the NHL without a helmet. After his retirement only five helmetless players remained in the league.

Snepsts appeared in 1,033 NHL games over his career, recording 38 goals and 195 assists for 233 points, along with 2009 penalty minutes. On March 14, 2011, the Canucks organization inducted Snepsts into their "Ring of Honour".

== Coaching career ==
Following his retirement, Snepsts remained with the St. Louis organization and became head coach of their top minor-league affiliate, the Peoria Rivermen of the International Hockey League. Despite having no coaching experience, he led the team to a 48–25–9 mark for a 105-point season before losing in the second round of the playoffs. For 1992–93, he was promoted to an assistant coaching position in St. Louis under head coach Bob Plager; however, he remained in that position for only a year before being replaced by new head coach Bob Berry.

Following his departure from the Blues, he spent a season as head coach of the San Diego Gulls of the IHL, leading them to a 93-point season. He signed on as head coach of the Portland Winter Hawks of the WHL for the 1998–99, but inherited a rebuilding team and was fired midway through his second season.

Snepsts was subsequently hired as a scout for the NHL's Central Scouting Service (CSS) in 2000, but left in 2005 to become part of the Canucks' Amateur Scouting staff. He would hold this position for 12 years before retiring in 2017. He remains with the organization, however, as an ambassador.

== Personal life ==
When Snepsts was 13, his mother was diagnosed with multiple sclerosis (MS), and he spent much of his career raising money for MS charities.

== Career statistics ==
			Regular season					Playoffs
Season	Team	League	GP	G	A	Pts	PIM	GP	G	A	Pts	PIM
1972–73	Edmonton Oil Kings	WCHL	68	2	24	26	155	11	0	1	1	54
1973–74	Edmonton Oil Kings	WCHL	68	8	41	49	239	—	—	—	—	—
1974–75	Vancouver Canucks	NHL	27	1	2	3	30	—	—	—	—	—
1974–75	Seattle Totems	CHL	19	1	6	7	58	—	—	—	—	—
1975–76	Vancouver Canucks	NHL	78	3	15	18	125	2	0	0	0	4
1976–77	Vancouver Canucks	NHL	79	4	18	22	149	—	—	—	—	—
1977–78	Vancouver Canucks	NHL	75	4	16	20	118	—	—	—	—	—
1978–79	Vancouver Canucks	NHL	76	7	24	31	130	3	0	0	0	0
1979–80	Vancouver Canucks	NHL	79	3	20	23	202	4	0	2	2	8
1980–81	Vancouver Canucks	NHL	76	3	16	19	212	3	0	0	0	8
1981–82	Vancouver Canucks	NHL	68	3	14	17	153	17	0	4	4	50
1982–83	Vancouver Canucks	NHL	46	2	8	10	80	4	1	1	2	8
1983–84	Vancouver Canucks	NHL	79	4	16	20	152	4	0	1	1	15
1984–85	Minnesota North Stars	NHL	71	0	7	7	232	9	0	0	0	24
1985–86	Detroit Red Wings	NHL	35	0	6	6	75	—	—	—	—	—
1986–87	Detroit Red Wings	NHL	54	1	13	14	129	11	0	2	2	18
1987–88	Detroit Red Wings	NHL	31	1	4	5	67	10	0	0	0	40
1987–88	Adirondack Red Wings	AHL	3	0	2	2	14	—	—	—	—	—
1988–89	Vancouver Canucks	NHL	59	0	8	8	69	7	0	1	1	6
1989–90	Vancouver Canucks	NHL	39	1	3	4	26	—	—	—	—	—
1989–90	St. Louis Blues	NHL	7	0	1	1	10	11	0	3	3	38
1990–91	St. Louis Blues	NHL	54	1	4	5	50	8	0	0	0	12
NHL totals			1,033	38	195	233	2,009	93	1	14	15	231

== References in popular culture ==
Snepsts was the subject of the song "Harold Snepsts", by Hamilton, Ontario garage band The Dik Van Dykes.

== See also ==
- List of NHL players with 1,000 games played
- List of NHL players with 2,000 career penalty minutes
