= Långsele AIF =

Swedish sports club

- Full name: Långsele allmänna idrottsförening
- Sport: association football, bandy, basketball, track and field athletics, gymnastics, ice hockey, skiing (earlier)
- Founded: 1914
- Team history: IF Renen (11 June-25 October 1920)
- Based in: Långsele, Sweden

Långsele AIF is a sports club in Långsele, Sweden, established on 11 June 1920 as IF Renen before changing name on 25 October the same year.

The women's soccer team, which began to play league games in 1975, played three seasons in the Swedish top division between 1978 and 1982.
