= Sedin =

Sedin may refer to:

== People ==
- The Sedin Twins, two Swedish former professional ice hockey players who are twin brothers
  - Daniel Sedin (born 1980)
  - Henrik Sedin (born 1980)
- Valter Sedin (born 2007), son of Henrik, Swedish-Canadian soccer player
- James Sedin (1930–2021), American ice hockey player

== Places ==
- Sedin 1, a village in Khuzestan Province, Iran
- Sedin 2, a village in Khuzestan Province, Iran
