= Seyyedin =

Seyyedin or Sedeyyen (Persian: ثدين) may refer to:

- Seyyedin 1
- Seyyedin 2
