= Victoria Awards =

Victoria Awards may refer to:

- Victoria Award, a Swedish sporting award, formerly known as the Victoria Scholarship
- Russian National Music Award, also known as the Victoria Award
- Music Victoria Awards, an award for achievements in the regional music scene of Victoria, Australia
