= Victoria Award =

Swedish award for athletic achievement

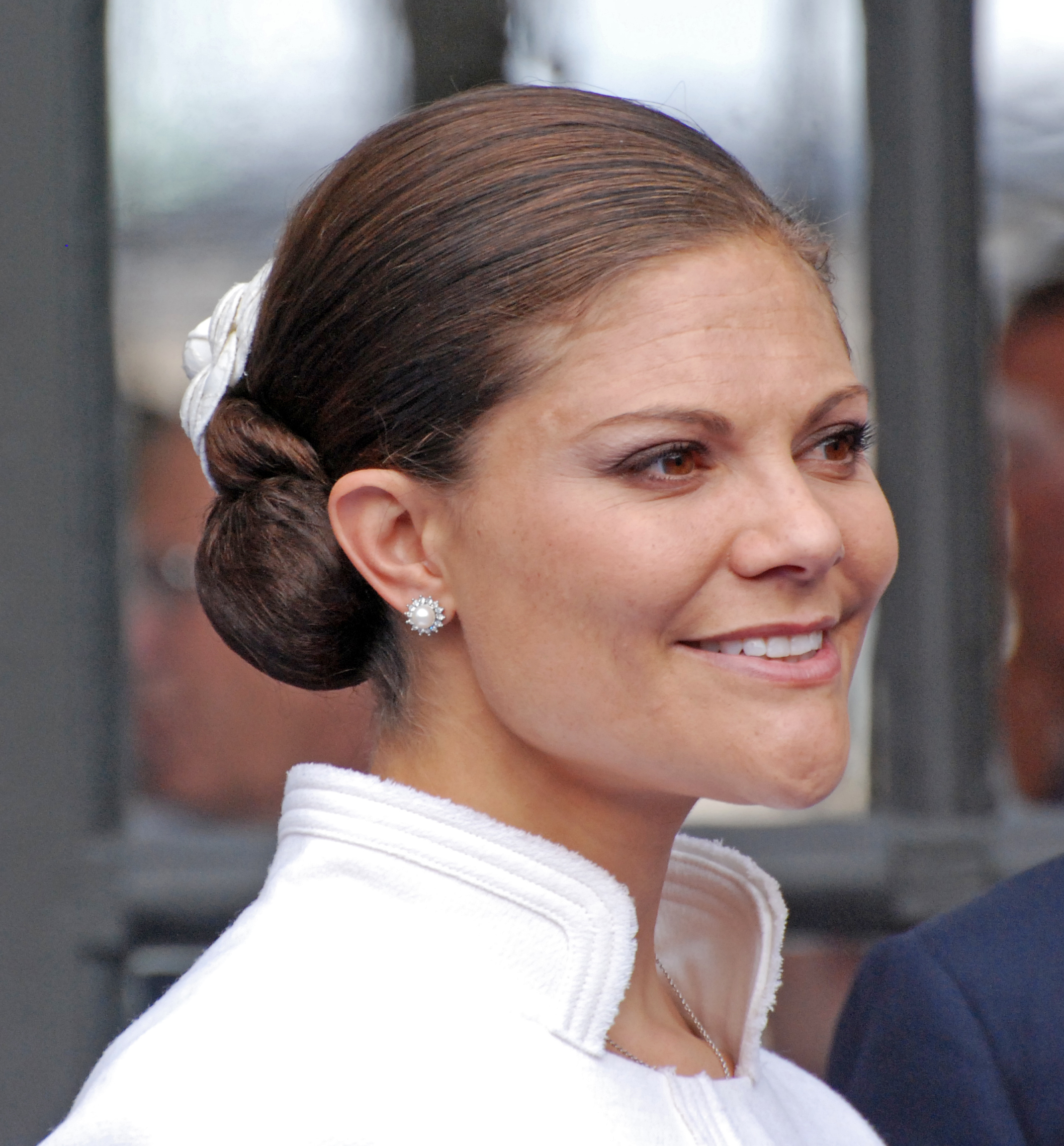
- Victoria of Sweden
- Awarded for: sporting award
- Date: 14 July 1979
- Location: Borgholm
- Country: Sweden
- Presented by: Victoria of Sweden
- Website: https://victoriadagarna.se/victoriapriset/

The Victoria Award (Swedish: Victoriapriset), earlier called the Victoria Scholarship (Swedish: Victoriastipendiet) is awarded to a Swedish sportsperson (or a pair of sportspersons) every year since 1979, on Öland, on the 14 July, the birthday of Victoria, Crown Princess of Sweden.

== Recipients of the Victoria Award ==
Year	Recipient	Sport
1979	Ingemar Stenmark	alpine skiing
1980	Stefan Persson	ice hockey
1981	Linda Haglund	track and field
1982	Tomas Gustafson	speed skating
1983	Stig Strand	alpine skiing
1984	Gunde Svan	cross-country skiing
1985	Patrik Sjöberg	track and field
1986	Torbjörn Nilsson	association football
1987	Tomas Johansson	wrestling
1988	Tomas Gustafson	speed skating
1989	Jan-Ove Waldner	table tennis
1990	Mikael Appelgren	table tennis
1991	Pernilla Wiberg	alpine skiing
1992	Jörgen Persson	table tennis
1993	Torgny Mogren	cross-country skiing
1994	Peter Forsberg	ice hockey
1995	Tomas Brolin	association football
1996	Sara Wedlund	track and field
1997	Agneta Andersson and Susanne Gunnarsson	canoe racing
1998	Magdalena Forsberg	biathlon
1999	Lars Frölander	swimming
2000	Therese Alshammar	swimming
2001	Mikael Ljungberg	wrestling
2002	Magnus Wislander	handball
2003	Carolina Klüft	track and field
2004	Anja Pärson	alpine skiing
2005	Stefan Holm and Christian Olsson	track and field
2006	Anna Carin Olofsson and Björn Lind	biathlon cross-country skiing
2007	Henrik Larsson	association football
2008	Susanna Kallur	track and field
2009	Helena Jonsson	biathlon
2010	Charlotte Kalla	cross-country skiing
2011	Henrik Sedin and Daniel Sedin	ice hockey
2012	Anette Norberg	curling
2013	Johan Olsson	cross-country skiing
2014	Sweden men's and women's relay teams	cross-country skiing
2015	Sarah Sjöström	swimming
2016	Henrik Lundqvist	ice hockey
2017	Jenny Rissveds	mountain biking
2018	Stina Nilsson	cross-country skiing
2019	Hanna Öberg	biathlon
2020	Armand Duplantis	pole vault
2021	Nils van der Poel	speed skating
2022	Ebba Årsjö	alpine skiing
2023	Erik Karlsson	ice hockey
2024	Isabelle Haak	volleyball
2025	Jonatan Hellvig and David Åhman	beach volleyball
2026	Frida Karlsson	cross-country skiing
