= Henrik Sedin =

Swedish ice hockey player (born 1980)

- Hockey Hall of Fame, 2022
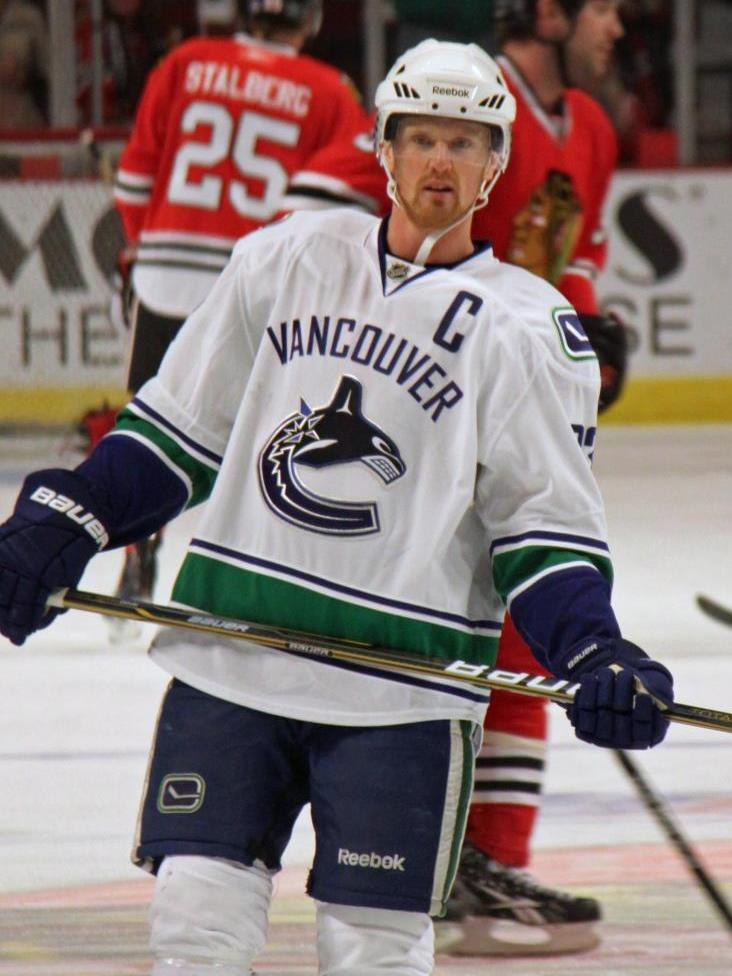
- Sedin with the Vancouver Canucks in 2010
- Born: 26 September 1980 (age 46) Örnsköldsvik, Sweden
- Height: 6 ft 2 in (188 cm)
- Weight: 183 lb (83 kg; 13 st 1 lb)
- Position: Centre
- Shot: Left
- Played for: Modo Hockey; Vancouver Canucks
- National team: Sweden
- NHL draft: 3rd overall, 1999; Vancouver Canucks
- Playing career: 1997–2018

Henrik Lars Sedin (seh-DEEN; born 26 September 1980) is a Swedish ice hockey executive and former centre who played his entire 17-season National Hockey League (NHL) career with the Vancouver Canucks from 2000 to 2018. He additionally served as the Canucks' captain from 2010 until his retirement. He and identical twin brother Daniel both serve as president of hockey operations for the Canucks. Born and raised in Örnsköldsvik, Sweden, the brothers played together throughout their careers; the pair were renowned for their effectiveness as a tandem. Henrik, a skilled passer, was known as a playmaker (150+ more career NHL assists than Daniel) while Daniel was known as a goal-scorer (150+ more career NHL goals than Henrik). Sedin tallied 240 goals and 830 assists, for 1,070 points, in 1,330 NHL games, ranking him as the Canucks' all-time leading points scorer.

Sedin began his career in the Swedish Hockey League with Modo Hockey in 1997 and was co-recipient, with brother Daniel, of the 1999 Guldpucken as Swedish player of the year. Selected third overall—one pick after brother Daniel—by the Canucks in the 1999 NHL entry draft, Sedin spent his entire NHL career in Vancouver. After four seasons with the club, he became the Canucks' top-scoring centre in 2005–06. He has since won three Cyrus H. McLean Trophies as the team's leading point-scorer (from 2007–08 to 2009–10) and one Cyclone Taylor Award as the team's most valuable player (2010). In 2009–10, he won the Hart Memorial Trophy as well as the Art Ross Trophy as the NHL's most valuable player and leading point-scorer, respectively. He was also named to the NHL first All-Star team that year and again in 2010–11, a season that included an appearance in the Stanley Cup Final, where Vancouver lost to the Boston Bruins in seven games. That summer, Henrik and Daniel were named co-recipients of the Victoria Scholarship as Swedish athletes of the year. Alongside his brother, Henrik was inducted into the Hockey Hall of Fame in 2022.

Internationally, Sedin has competed on Sweden's national ice hockey team. He is a two-time Olympian and helped Sweden to a gold medal at the 2006 Winter Games in Turin. In five appearances at the IIHF World Championships, he has won bronze medals in 1999 and 2001 and clinched the world title in 2013. At the junior level, he appeared in one World U17 Hockey Challenge (where he won silver), two European Junior and three World Junior Championships.

== Early life ==
Henrik was born on 26 September 1980 in Örnsköldsvik, Sweden, six minutes before his identical twin brother, Daniel. The pair have two older brothers, Stefan and Peter. Their father, Tommy, is a school vice principal who played for Modo Hockey in the 1960s; their mother, Tora, is a nurse. Henrik began playing organized hockey with Daniel when they were eight. They did not regularly play on the same line until Daniel switched from centre to wing at the age of 14. Henrik and Daniel attended high school at Nolaskolan Gymnasium in their hometown in Sweden while playing professionally for Modo Hockey.

== Playing career ==
=== Modo Hockey (1997–2000) ===
Aged 16, Henrik and Daniel Sedin began their professional careers in 1997–98 with Modo Hockey of the Swedish Hockey League. Henrik recorded a goal and five points over 39 games during his rookie season. In his second year with Modo, he improved to 12 goals and 34 points, joint second in team scoring with Samuel Påhlsson, behind Daniel. At the end of the season, Henrik and Daniel were named co-recipients of the Guldpucken, the Swedish player of the year award.

The Sedins were considered top prospects for the 1999 NHL entry draft. Rated as the top European prospects, they were expected to be top five selections and expressed a desire to play for the same team. Their agent, Mike Barnett, president of international talent agency IMG, presented them with two options to circumvent the usual NHL draft process, allowing them to play together. The first option was for the pair to enter the 1999 draft and not sign with their respective NHL clubs for two years, allowing them to become unrestricted free agents. This option required that they play junior ice hockey in North America, which was not their intention. Barnett also suggested that either Henrik or Daniel opt out of the 1999 draft, in the hope that the same team that selected the first twin would select the other the following year. On the possibility of the Sedins' playing for separate teams, Vancouver Canucks scout Thomas Gradin commented, "They're good enough to play with anyone, but separately their capacity might decrease by 10 or 15 percent." Nevertheless, Henrik and Daniel both entered the 1999 draft expecting to be selected by separate teams. However, then-Canucks general manager Brian Burke already possessed the third overall pick and through a series of transactions (Note: The Canucks acquired the second overall pick to select Daniel as follows.: 1. The Canucks traded Bryan McCabe and their first-round pick in 2000 or 2001 to the Chicago Blackhawks in exchange for the Blackhawks' first-round pick (4th overall) in the 1999 draft.; 2. The fourth overall pick acquired from the Blackhawks was then traded along with two third-round picks in the 1999 draft (75th and 88th) to the Tampa Bay Lightning in exchange for the Lightning's first-round pick (1st overall) in the 1999 draft.; 3. The first overall pick acquired from the Lightning was then traded to the Atlanta Thrashers for the Thrashers' first-round pick (second overall) in the 1999 draft and a conditional third-round pick in the 2000 draft, under the condition that then-Thrashers general manager Don Waddell not select either Sedin with the first overall pick.) he obtained the second overall pick. He used these second and third overall picks to select Daniel and Henrik, respectively. Gradin notified them of the Canucks' intentions five minutes before the draft. Although then-Tampa Bay Lightning general manager Rick Dudley was ready to make Daniel his first overall choice before opening negotiations, he was convinced by Burke and Barnett that Daniel would not sign unless his brother was on the same team.

On 27 July 1999, a month following the draft, Henrik and Daniel signed three-year contracts with the Canucks. As the contract did not require them to begin playing in Vancouver immediately, they announced on 12 August they would return to Sweden to play one more season with Modo. During the 1999–2000 season, Henrik led Modo in scoring with 47 points in 50 games, two points ahead of Daniel. The two brothers played on a line with New York Islanders prospect Mattias Weinhandl.

=== Vancouver Canucks (2000–2018) ===
==== Early years (2000–2006) ====
The 2000–01 NHL season was Henrik's first for the Canucks. His debut was the team's first game of the campaign on 5 October 2000, a 6–3 loss to the Philadelphia Flyers. With the game, Henrik and Daniel became the fourth pair of twins to have played in the NHL. Three days later, Henrik assisted on Daniel's first career NHL goal in a 5–4 win against the Tampa Bay Lightning. The goal tied the game at 4 with 1:26 left in regulation. In a 5–2 win against the Toronto Maple Leafs on 16 October 2000, Henrik scored his first NHL goal and added an assist on Daniel's second career goal. Henrik tallied 29 points over the course of the campaign—second among team rookies to Daniel's 34 points. He and Daniel played primarily on the Canucks' third line.

Henrik improved to 36 points in his second NHL season; he finished with five goals in his last six games, taking his season total to 16. In the opening game of the 2002 Stanley Cup playoffs, Henrik scored the overtime winner against the first-seeded Detroit Red Wings to put the Canucks 1–0 ahead in the series; it was his first NHL playoff goal. Detroit went on to eliminate the Canucks in six games en route to winning the Stanley Cup. During the 2002–03 season, Henrik suffered a sprained left shoulder that forced him out of three games. He had sustained the injury during a game against the Edmonton Oilers on 14 December 2002. Henrik also missed a game on 23 February 2003 because of a hand injury. He played 78 games during 2002–03 and finished the campaign with 39 points.

After their third NHL season, Henrik and Daniel were re-signed to one-year, US$1.125 million contracts on 29 July 2003. The Sedins began the 2003–04 season on a line with first-year player Jason King. The trio were named the "Mattress Line" (two twins and a King) and formed the Canucks' second scoring unit until King was reassigned to the team's minor league affiliate midway through the season. On 7 November 2003, St. Louis Blues forward Doug Weight was suspended four games without pay for a cross-check he delivered to Henrik during a game the previous day; Henrik was not injured. On 17 December 2003, Henrik was a healthy scratch for the first and only time in his NHL career. He was also sidelined for five games in March 2004 due to sore ribs. Over 76 games, Henrik increased his points total over the previous season to 42. During the off-season, Henrik and Daniel were re-signed to one-year, US$1.25 million contracts on 10 September 2004.

During the 2004–05 lockout, Henrik returned to Sweden to play for Modo with Daniel and their Canucks teammate Markus Näslund. During a game against Mora IK on 20 November 2004, Henrik received a slash that required a minor amputation to his left little finger. He finished the season with 36 points in 44 games, third in team scoring behind Peter Forsberg and Mattias Weinhandl.

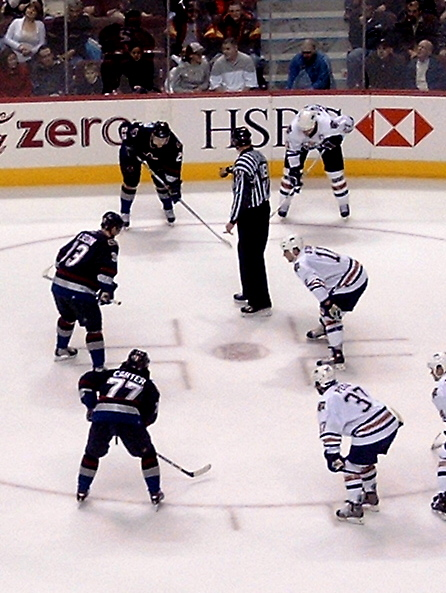
Henrik and Daniel Sedin, along with Anson Carter, prepare to face the Edmonton Oilers in December 2005.

As NHL play resumed in 2005–06, Henrik returned to the Canucks and scored 75 points, finishing second in team scoring behind Markus Näslund, who had 79 points. His breakout season was sparked, in part, by the signing of winger Anson Carter, who played on the Sedins' line and led the team in goal-scoring. The trio matched the scoring pace of the Canucks' top line of Näslund, Todd Bertuzzi and Brendan Morrison. Vancouver's head coach at the time, Marc Crawford, recalled that season as marking the Sedins' ascent as leaders on the team, stating, "By the end of that year, they definitely were our top guys. They had surpassed Näslund and Bertuzzi." During the off-season, Henrik and Daniel re-signed with the Canucks to identical three-year, $10.75 million contracts on 30 June 2006. Despite the team's success with Carter, the Canucks did not re-sign him; he joined the Columbus Blue Jackets the following season.

==== Emergence, Hart Trophy season (2006–2010) ====
In the 2006–07 season, Henrik established himself as the Canucks' top-line centre. Winger Taylor Pyatt, who had been acquired in a trade from the Buffalo Sabres during the off-season, replaced Carter as the Sedins' linemate and went on to score a career-high 23 goals. For the fifth-straight season, Henrik recorded a personal best, with 81 points; he set a new Canucks record for assists in one season with 71, beating the 62 by André Boudrias in 1974–75. Henrik passed Boudrias on 25 March 2007, with a three-assist effort during a 5–4 loss to the Colorado Avalanche. In the opening game of the 2007 playoffs against the Dallas Stars, Henrik scored a game-winning, quadruple-overtime goal to end the seventh longest game in NHL history (and longest in Canucks history) at 138 minutes and six seconds of play. He struggled to produce offensively in his 12 games in the playoffs, however, managing four points as the Canucks were eliminated by the eventual Stanley Cup champion Anaheim Ducks in the second round.

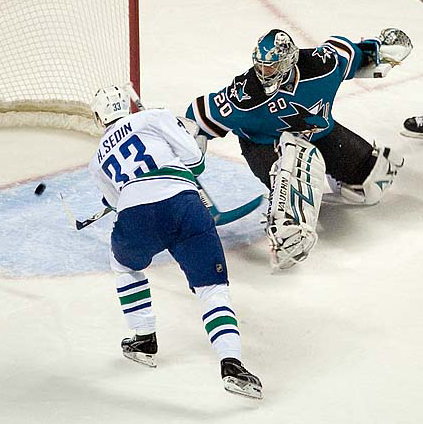
Henrik scores against Evgeni Nabokov in December 2007.

Henrik was awarded his first NHL career penalty shot on 27 November 2007, during a game against the Anaheim Ducks. His attempt was stopped by goaltender Jonas Hiller. In 2007–08, Henrik was selected to play for the Western Conference in the 2008 All-Star Game against the East, the first appearance of his career. He recorded two assists. He won his first Cyrus H. McLean Trophy as Vancouver's leading scorer with 76 points. His 61 assists ranked fourth in the League for the second consecutive season.

The following season, Henrik scored 22 goals and 82 points, tying for the team lead in points with Daniel. Steve Bernier had been acquired in the 2008 off-season in another trade with Buffalo and began the season on the top line with the Sedins. Bernier was later removed; on 12 February 2009, Canucks head coach Alain Vigneault moved Alexandre Burrows to the line during a game against the Phoenix Coyotes. After recording 19 points and three game-winning goals in March, Henrik was named the NHL's Second Star of the Month. He added ten points over ten games in the 2009 playoffs, helping the Canucks advance to the second round, where they were defeated in six games by the Chicago Blackhawks.

Set to become unrestricted free agents on 1 July 2009, Henrik and Daniel began negotiating with the Canucks in the off-season and were reported to have asked for 12-year, $63 million contracts in mid-June. With free agency looming, Canucks general manager Mike Gillis travelled to Sweden to visit the Sedins, where they agreed on identical five-year, $30.5 million contracts on 1 July. On 30 September, Henrik was announced as one of the Canucks' three alternate captains, along with Ryan Kesler and Willie Mitchell.

Four games into the 2009–10 season, Daniel suffered the first major injury of his career, breaking his foot on 7 October 2009 in a game against the Montreal Canadiens. He was sidelined for 18 games, marking the first time in Henrik's career that he played without his brother for an extended period. In Daniel's absence, however, Henrik enjoyed a high-scoring start to the season. On 14 November, he scored his first NHL career hat-trick in an 8–2 win against the Colorado Avalanche. Leading up to Daniel's 22 November return, Henrik scored seven goals in seven games. He continued his pace into December, recording a League-leading 25 points (five goals, 20 assists) in 15 games to be named the NHL's First Star of the Month. The following month, he was named Second Star, having recorded 25 points in 13 games. On 7 January 2010, Henrik moved into top spot in the NHL scoring race, ahead of San Jose Sharks centre Joe Thornton with a three-assist night against the Phoenix Coyotes for all three assists on goals by Alexandre Burrows. It marked the first time in nearly five years, since Näslund was tied with Robert Lang on 18 February 2004, that a Canucks player held the League lead in scoring. During a 3–1 win against the Calgary Flames on 14 March, Henrik recorded his 416th career assist on a goal scored by Daniel to pass Trevor Linden as Vancouver's all-time leader. On 27 March, he scored two assists on goals by Aleaxandre Burrows and Daniel against the San Jose Sharks to become the fourth Canuck in team history to record a 100-point season (after Pavel Bure, Alexander Mogilny and Markus Näslund). He was named Third Star of the Month for March after scoring 24 points in 15 games.

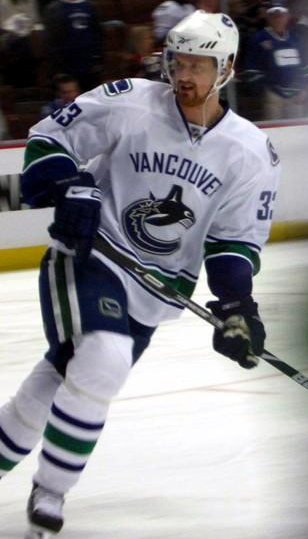
Henrik during an away game in March 2009.

Henrik entered the final game of the regular season, on 10 April against the Calgary Flames, one point behind Washington Capitals forward and captain Alexander Ovechkin for the NHL scoring lead. In a pre-game ceremony, he was awarded the Canucks' Cyclone Taylor Trophy, Cyrus H. McLean Trophy and Molson Cup as the team's most valuable player, leading scorer and three-star selection leader, respectively. He then went on to record four assists in a 7–3 win on three goals by Daniel and a goal by Kevin Bieksa to finish the season with 112 points, passing Ovechkin for the season lead, while also breaking Pavel Bure's franchise record of 110 points, set in 1992–93. Ovechkin failed to register a point in his last game the next day against the Boston Bruins, earning Henrik the League scoring title and making him the first Art Ross Trophy winner in Canucks history. With a League-leading 83 assists, he also surpassed his own team record of 71 assists in one season. In the subsequent 2010 playoffs, Henrik added 14 points in 12 games. He scored the winning goal in game four against the Los Angeles Kings with under three minutes to go in regulation to tie the series at two games each. The Canucks went on to eliminate the Kings in six games before being ousted by the Chicago Blackhawks the following round for the second consecutive year.

On 19 May 2010, The Sporting News named Henrik their 2009–10 Player of the Year. He received 108 first-place votes out of the 353 NHL players, coaches and executives polled. Ovechkin received 86 first-place votes while Pittsburgh Penguins captain Sidney Crosby received 72 first-place votes. Henrik was also voted by his countrymen in the league to receive the Viking Award as the NHL's best Swedish player. At the NHL Awards Show the following month on 23 June, Henrik, Ovechkin and Crosby were up for both the Hart Memorial Trophy, awarded to the player deemed by the media to be the most valuable to his team, and the Ted Lindsay Award, given to the best player as voted by the NHL Players' Association (NHLPA). After losing the Ted Lindsay Award to Ovechkin, Henrik was awarded the Hart, becoming the first Canuck and second Swedish player (after Peter Forsberg in 2003) to win the trophy. Henrik garnered 894 voting points, compared to Ovechkin's 834 and Crosby's 729. He admitted afterwards to feeling like the underdog going into the awards ceremony, noting "[Ovechkin and Crosby] are the faces of the sport ... to be standing next to them as the old guy, it's a strange feeling." He was additionally named to the NHL first All-Star team; at the same time, twin Daniel was named to the NHL second All-Star team. It marked the first time since Phil and Tony Esposito in 1973–74 that two brothers were named postseason NHL All-Stars. They were also chosen to appear together on the cover of EA Sports' European version of the NHL 11 video game.

==== Stanley Cup Final appearance and captaincy (2010–2018) ====
On 9 October 2010, Henrik was named the Canucks' 13th captain in team history during a pre-game ceremony celebrating the start of the team's 40th season of play. He succeeded goaltender Roberto Luongo, who had stepped down as team captain the previous month after having served as the team captain the previous two seasons prior. Early in the 2010–11 season, he scored his first penalty shot goal on his second NHL career attempt on 1 November. Playing the New Jersey Devils, he scored on a backhand deke against goaltender Martin Brodeur. Midway through the campaign, he was chosen to his second career NHL All-Star Game. Playing on Team Lidstrom opposite Daniel and teammate Ryan Kesler on Team Staal, Henrik helped his squad to an 11–10 win, recording two assists in the process. Finishing the season with 19 goals and a League-leading 75 assists over all 82 games, he ranked fourth in the NHL point-scoring with 94; only brother Daniel, Martin St. Louis of the Tampa Bay Lightning and Corey Perry of the Anaheim Ducks finished ahead of him. With Daniel winning the League scoring title, the two became the first brothers to win the Art Ross Trophy in consecutive years. (Chicago Blackhawks forwards Doug and Max Bentley also won separate scoring titles, but had achieved the feat three years apart in 1943 and 1946, respectively.)

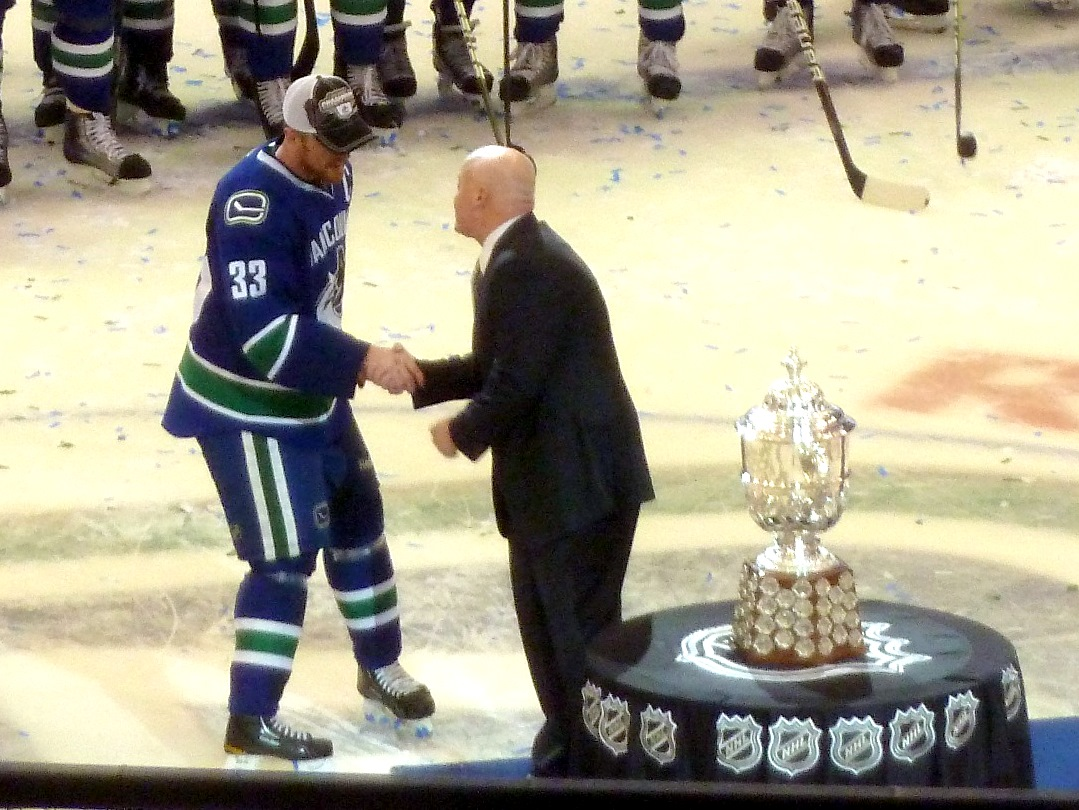
Henrik accepts the Clarence S. Campbell Bowl by deputy commissioner Bill Daly on behalf of the team as the 2011 Western Conference champions.

As the Canucks established a team-record 54 wins and 117 points, they won their first Presidents' Trophy as the team with the best regular season record. Entering the 2011 playoffs as the Presidents' Trophy, the Canucks eliminated the defending Stanley Cup champion and eighth seeded Chicago Blackhawks and the fifth seeded Nashville Predators in seven and six games, respectively. In the third round against the second seeded San Jose Sharks, Henrik established a single-game Canucks playoff record with four assists in Game 4 on two goals by Sami Salo along with goals by Alexandre Burrows and Ryan Kesler, leading the Canucks to a 4–2 win. His first three assists helped the Canucks set another team record for the fastest three goals scored in a playoff game; all three were registered on 5-on-3 powerplays in a span of one minute and fifty-five seconds. With his third assist of the game, Henrik set another team record with his 16th assist of the 2011 playoffs, surpassing Pavel Bure's mark set in 1994. With San Jose facing elimination the following game, Henrik recorded two more assists on goals by Burrows and Kesler for his 11th and 12th points in the series, tying Bure for most in a single round by a Canucks player. Vancouver won the game 3–2 in double-overtime on a Kevin Bieksa game winner to advance to the Stanley Cup Final. Playing the third seeded Boston Bruins, the Canucks won the first two games of the series, but went on to lose four-games-to-three. Henrik finished the postseason with three goals and 22 points (three goals, 19 assists) over all 25 games, ranking second in playoff scoring behind Bruins centre David Krejčí. It was revealed following their defeat that Henrik had been playing a large portion of the playoffs with a back injury.

A week after Vancouver's Game 7 loss, Henrik was on hand at the NHL Awards Ceremony in Las Vegas, having been nominated along with Daniel for the NHL Foundation Player Award for their charitable work. They lost the award to Los Angeles Kings captain Dustin Brown. For his regular season efforts, Henrik was named to the NHL first All-Star team for a second consecutive year, alongside Daniel, who earned the distinction for the first time. Returning to Sweden in the off-season, Henrik and Daniel were co-recipients of the Victoria Scholarship as the country's athletes of the year. They became the third and fourth ice hockey players to receive the award, after Stefan Persson in 1980 and Peter Forsberg in 1994. Henrik and Daniel were presented the award, commemorated with glass plates, on 14 July 2011, in the city of Borgholm.

Playing in the 2011–12 season opener, Henrik dressed for his 500th consecutive NHL regular season game, having not missed a contest since returning from a rib injury on 21 March 2004. Almost three months later, he surpassed Brendan Morrison's Canucks record of 534 consecutive games played in a 5–2 win against the Edmonton Oilers on 26 December 2011. The previous game, in which he tied the record, was played against Morrison's Calgary Flames. (Note: Morrison left Vancouver in 2008 and joined the Flames two years later.) At the end of the month, Henrik was named the NHL's Third Star for December, having recorded 22 points (two goals and 20 assists) over 15 games (a League-high total for the month). At the mid-season mark, Henrik was named to his third NHL All-Star Game in January 2012. He was one of four players representing the Canucks, including Daniel, Alexander Edler, and Cody Hodgson, who was named as a rookie. With the exception of Hodgson, all the Canucks All-Stars were selected to Team Alfredsson. Henrik went on to record a goal and two assists in a 12–9 loss to Team Chara. Shortly after the All-Star break, Henrik injured his foot while blocking a shot from Nashville Predators defenceman Kevin Klein on 7 February. He briefly left the game and while a subsequent CT scan revealed no fracture, he remained questionable for the following contest before eventually playing through the ailment. Later that month, Henrik began a streak that saw him go eight games without a point for the first time since the 2003–04 season. (Note: He ended the streak on 14 March 2012 with two assists in a 5–4 loss against the Phoenix Coyotes.) Near the end of the regular season on 21 March, Daniel sustained a concussion during a game against the Chicago Blackhawks, forcing Henrik to play without his brother for the final nine contests of the campaign. During that span, he recorded 11 points, leading the Canucks to eight wins and one loss. The season-ending streak helped the Canucks to their second consecutive Presidents' Trophy, clinching the championship on the last game of the campaign on 7 April, a 3–0 win against the Edmonton Oilers. During the contest, Henrik broke a 22-game goalless streak with the game-winner. With 67 assists, he led the League for a third consecutive season, becoming the fifth player in NHL history to do so, after Joe Thornton (2005–08), Wayne Gretzky (1979–92), Bobby Orr (1969–72) and Stan Mikita (1964–67). Though his points total dropped to 81, which ranked ninth in the NHL, he led the Canucks in scoring and was voted the team MVP. The Canucks entered the 2012 playoffs against the eighth-seeded and eventual Stanley Cup champion Los Angeles Kings. With Daniel out with a late season concussion, Vancouver lost the first two games. In Game 3, Henrik received a hard hit from Kings' forward and captain Dustin Brown—he had to be helped onto the bench following the hit and went to the locker room for six minutes. Despite later returning to the game, the Canucks lost 1–0. With Daniel back in the lineup for Game 4, Henrik registered a goal on Kings' goaltender Jonathan Quick and an assist on a Kevin Bieksa goal in a 3–1 Canucks' victory. Still facing elimination in Game 5, Henrik scored a power play goal on Quick late in the first period to give Vancouver the early lead, though Canucks were unable to add another goal and eventually lost the game 2–1 in overtime with the winning goal scored by Kings forward Jarret Stoll for a 4–1 defeat in the series. Henrik finished the playoffs with two goals and five points to lead the team in scoring.

Despite another lockout beginning on 15 September 2012, the Sedins decided that they would only return to Modo, now managed by former teammate Markus Näslund, if the entire 2012–13 season wound up cancelled. Instead, the shortened season began in January 2013 with a 48-game schedule over the normal 82 game schedule, and shortly into the season on 15 February 2013, Henrik passed Näslund as the franchise's all-time leading scorer with 757 points against the Dallas Stars. After scoring the record-setting point against the Stars, Sedin was given a standing ovation that carried on as play continued. After three minutes, the play stopped and Sedin saluted the crowd. During a commercial break, the Canucks ran a tribute video for the accomplishment, featuring congratulations from Näslund and Trevor Linden, the third-leading scorer in team history. In the final game of the season against the Edmonton Oilers on 27 April, Canucks head coach Alain Vigneault wanted to rest his regulars ahead of the playoffs. However, he played Henrik in the game though only for 22 seconds; he left the bench after just one shift. For his part, Henrik told Vigneault before the game that "he would be okay with sitting out the game" and to him the streak is just "a number in the paper." Vigneault responded by telling Sedin that "he's not going to be the one that breaks the streak", and he gave him the choice to remain on the bench or return to the locker room. Sedin felt remaining on the bench would have been a further distraction and chose to leave. Henrik finished the season with 11 goals and 34 assists for 45 points in all 48 games.

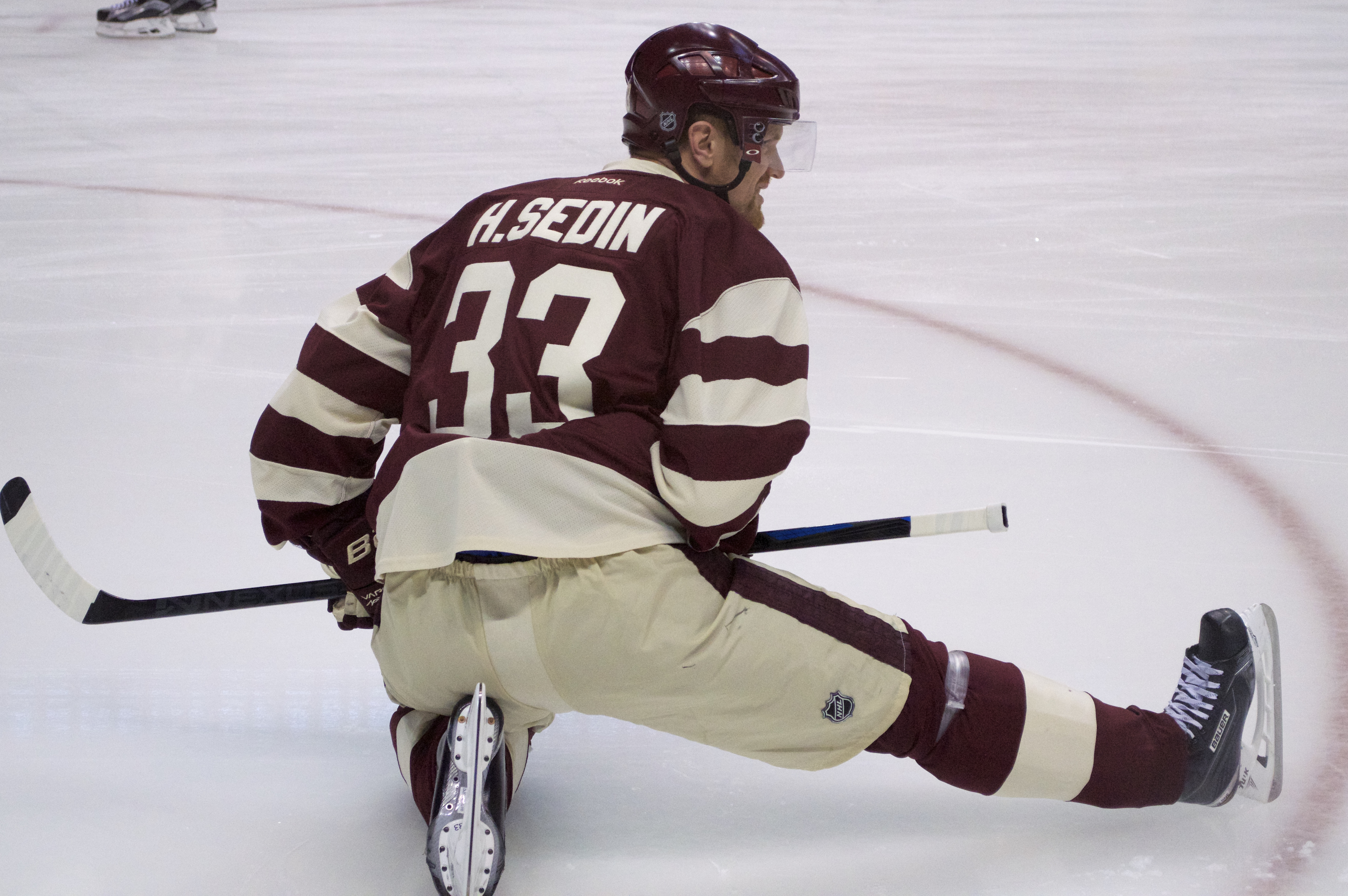
Henrik wearing the Canucks' commemorative Vancouver Millionaires jersey in March 2015.

As of the end of the 2012–13 season, six 2003–04 season regular season games plus four regular season games in the previous season are the only NHL games he had missed in the regular season or play-offs throughout his NHL career of 1,039 games, to that point. Through the end of the 2012–13 season Henrik trailed only St. Louis Blues defenceman Jay Bouwmeester among active NHL ironman streaks; Bouwmeester had played in six more consecutive regular season games than Henrik's 629. On 21 January 2014, Sedin's consecutive regular season games streak ended at 679 games due to a rib injury sustained 16 January when he was cross-checked in Phoenix by Coyotes forward Martin Hanzal.

On 1 November 2013, the Sedins signed matching $28 million contract extensions to play four more years with the Canucks. Sedin played his 1,000th NHL game against the Winnipeg Jets on 12 March 2014, becoming only the second player in franchise history to reach that milestone. His brother Daniel reached the same milestone early in the 2014–15 season. Sedin appeared in 70 games for the Canucks during the 2013–14 season and scored 50 points: 11 goals and 39 assists. Having been eliminated by the San Jose Sharks in the first round of the 2013 playoffs, the 2013–14 Canucks failed to qualify for the postseason for the first time since 2008.

On 3 March 2015, against the San Jose Sharks, Sedin scored his 900th point, a goal on Sharks goaltender Antti Niemi in the second period of the game. He was the 101st player to reach this milestone. Sedin became the first player in Canucks history to record 900 points with the team. On 6 April, Sedin scored his 700th career assist against the Los Angeles Kings. During the 2014–15 season, Sedin had 18 goals and 55 assists, and his total of 73 points was his highest since 2011–12.

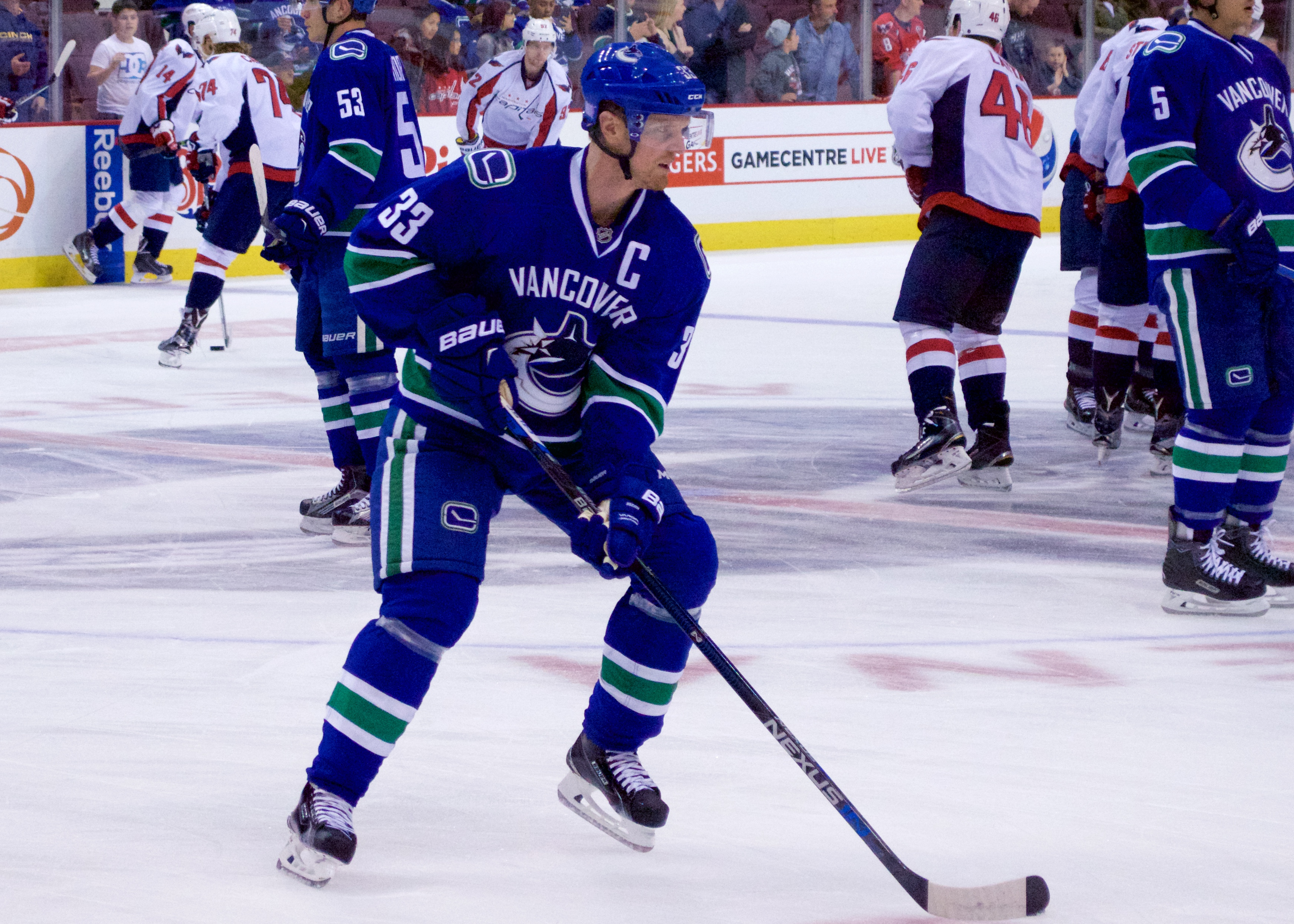
Henrik warming up prior to a game in October 2015

Sedin was awarded the King Clancy Memorial Trophy at the conclusion of the 2015–16 season. Henrik surpassed Trevor Linden for most regular season games played in a Canucks uniform on 13 February 2016 during a game against the Toronto Maple Leafs. Sedin had 11 goals and 44 assists for 55 points in 74 contests in 2015–16.

On 20 January 2017, Sedin reached the 1,000 point milestone with a goal against the Florida Panthers and former teammate Roberto Luongo. Sedin had 15 goals and 35 assists for 50 points in all 82 games during the 2016–17 season. A pregame ceremony in his honour was held on 4 February.

On 2 April 2018, Daniel and Henrik announced that they would be retiring at the end of the season in a letter thanking the Canucks organization and their fans. On 5 April, the Sedin Twins played their final game in Rogers Arena against the Arizona Coyotes. In their last home game, Henrik recorded two assists on his brother's goals to help defeat the Coyotes 4–3. Henrik played his final game on 7 April, in a 3–2 shootout loss to the Edmonton Oilers; he retired alongside Daniel at the end of the 2017–18 season after 17 seasons and 1,330 regular season games with the Vancouver Canucks. Despite their retirement, Henrik and his brother were nominated, and named finalists, for the King Clancy Memorial Trophy, which they won on 20 June.

== Post-playing career ==
On 12 February 2020, Henrik's number 33 would be raised to the rafters alongside his brother Daniel's number 22 in an hour-long jersey retirement ceremony, the culmination of a week-long celebration of the twins' career.

On 22 June 2021, it was announced that Henrik and Daniel would join the Canucks Hockey Operations department and were named special advisors to the general manager.

On 30 May 2022, the Canucks announced that the Sedins had transitioned into new roles with player development, working daily on and off the ice with young players in Vancouver and Abbotsford.

On 28 June 2022, it was announced that Henrik would join his brother Daniel in being inducted into the Hockey Hall of Fame later that year, together becoming the first career Canucks to make it to the hall.

On 14 May 2026, the Canucks announced that Henrik and Daniel would be named Co-Presidents of the Canucks.

== International play ==
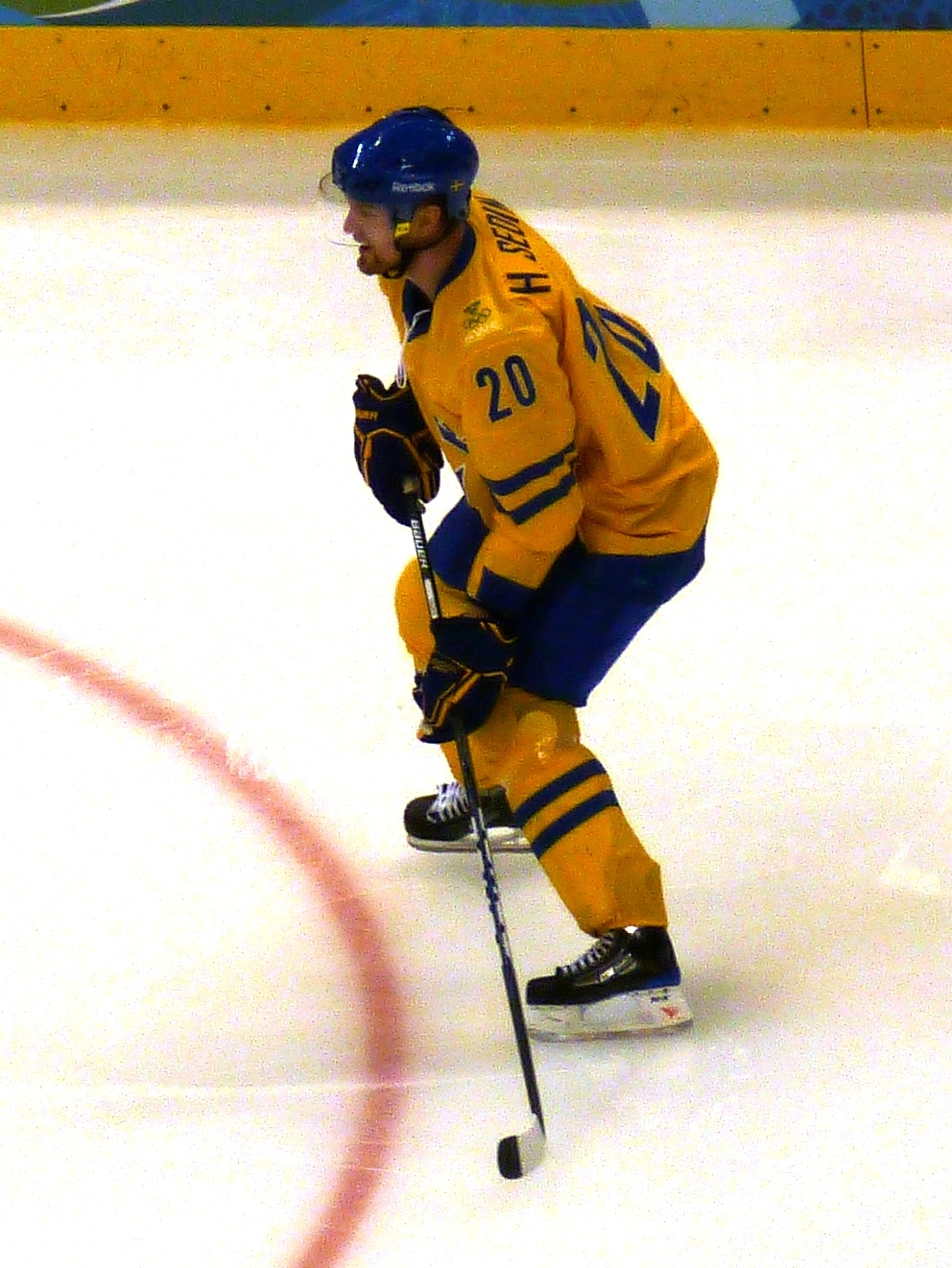
- Henrik during the 2010 Olympics

Medal record

Representing Sweden

Ice hockey

Olympic Games
Gold medal – first place	2006 Torino	

World Championships
Gold medal – first place	2013 Sweden/Finland	
Bronze medal – third place	1999 Norway	
Bronze medal – third place	2001 Germany	

European Junior Championships
Gold medal – first place	1998	

World U17 Hockey Challenge
Silver medal – second place	1997 Canada	

Henrik played for the first time in North America with Sweden's national under-17 team at the 1997 World U17 Hockey Challenge, held in Alberta. Recording 20 points (12 goals and eight assists) over six games, he helped Sweden to a silver medal. After going undefeated in five contests, they were defeated in the gold medal game by Team Ontario, 6–2.

Henrik competed for Sweden at the 1997 European Junior Championships, recording three goals and seven points over six games. He joined Sweden for the 1998 European Junior Championships, the final game of which required Sweden to beat Russia by four goals to surpass Finland in goal differential and win the gold medal. Henrik recorded a goal and an assist against Russia as Sweden won 5–1.

In his NHL draft year, Henrik competed for Sweden at the 1999 World Junior Championships in Winnipeg, Manitoba. He recorded nine points in six games, fifth in tournament scoring and second in team scoring to brother Daniel, as Sweden failed to win a medal. Later that year, Henrik made his international debut for the Swedish men's team at the 1999 World Championships in Norway. He scored no points in eight games as Sweden won the bronze medal.

In 2000, Henrik once again competed in both the World Junior and Senior Championships. At the junior tournament in Sweden, Henrik led the tournament with 13 points in seven games, but Sweden did not earn a medal. At the World Championships, Henrik recorded five points as Sweden again failed to medal.

Following his rookie season with the Vancouver Canucks, Henrik made his third World Championships appearance, in 2001 in Germany. He earned his second bronze medal in three years as Sweden defeated the United States 3–2 in the bronze medal game. He made a fourth tournament appearance at the 2005 World Championships in Austria. Sweden missed out on the bronze medal, losing to Russia 6–3. Henrik had a goal and an assist in a losing effort during the bronze medal game. He finished the tournament with two goals and six points in nine games.

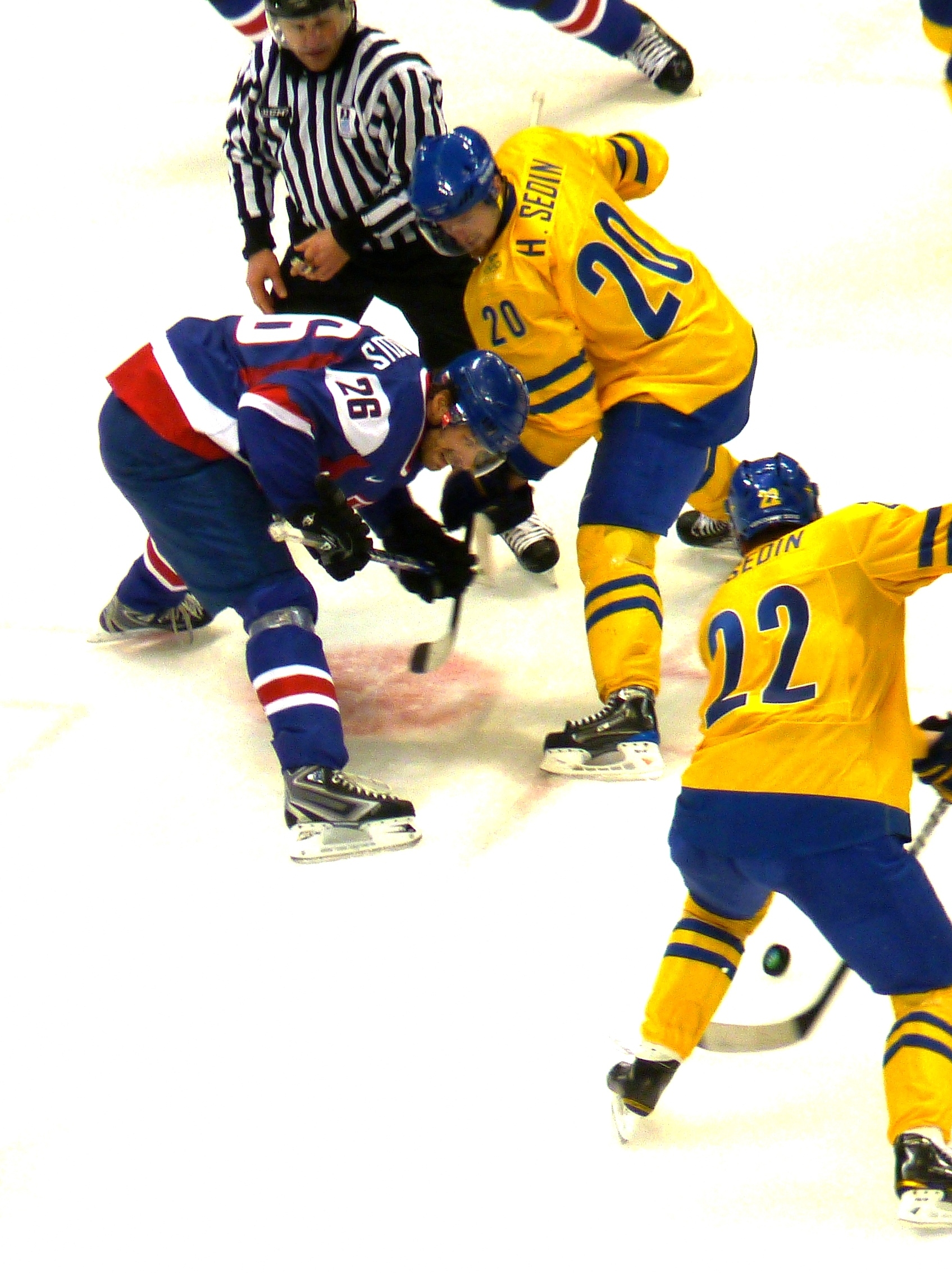
Henrik (#20 in gold) wins a faceoff to brother Daniel against Slovak forward Michal Handzuš.

On 22 December 2005, Henrik was named to the Swedish Olympic team for the 2006 Winter Olympics in Turin. He joined Daniel, Markus Näslund and Mattias Öhlund as one of four Canucks on the squad. Competing in his first Olympics, he contributed four points as Sweden won a gold medal, defeating Finland 3–2 in the final. Four years later, Henrik was once again named to the Swedish Olympic team for the 2010 Winter Games in Vancouver. Unlike the previous Olympics, Henrik went into the 2010 tournament as one of Sweden's key players: at the time of the roster announcement on 27 December 2009, he led all Swedish players in NHL scoring. Sweden failed to defend their gold medal from Turin, however, losing to Slovakia in the tournament quarterfinal. Henrik had two assists in four games.

Still recovering from the rib injury he suffered during the 2013–14 NHL season, Sedin was unable to play at the 2014 Olympics. In 2016, Henrik was named Captain of Sweden at the World Cup of Hockey after captain Henrik Zetterberg was injured in a practice game. Sweden reached the semifinals before losing to a side with representatives from eight European nations.

== Playing style ==
Throughout his career, Henrik recorded markedly more assists than goals. Known as a playmaker, he started play sequences that led to goals with passes to his teammates. Many of the plays he generated were created off the cycle. Henrik's familiarity with Daniel's play enhanced his effectiveness; the pair were known for their ability to find each other intuitively with passes, often without looking.

Beginning around the 2008–09 season, Henrik began to expand his skill-set by scoring more goals. His increased tendency to shoot was given an extra push when Daniel suffered the first major injury of his career early in the 2009–10 season, forcing Henrik to play without his brother for several weeks and consequently pass less often. He recorded the first two 20-goal seasons of his career in both 2008–09 and 2009–10, and increased his shot totals.

With his offensive skill the prime component of his game, Henrik was known to avoid initiating contact with opposing players. Early in their careers, he and Daniel were knocked off the puck easily. As a result, players often took advantage of the brothers' lack of physicality by playing aggressively against them. Canucks then-general manager Brian Burke publicly complained, commenting during a 2002 playoff series against the Detroit Red Wings, "'Sedin' is not Swedish for 'punch me or headlock me in a scrum'." As their careers progressed, the Sedins worked on their strength, improving their puck possession and allowing them to play more effectively.

== Personal life ==
Henrik is married to Johanna Sedin; they have two sons: Valter, who was born in 2007 in Vancouver, and Harry, who was born on 12 May 2010. They live together in the city's Yaletown neighbourhood, and return to Sweden during the off-season. In March 2010, Henrik and Johanna made a joint $1.5 million donation, with Daniel and his wife Marinette, to the BC Children's Hospital's $200 million project for a new building; the two families requested that it be put towards a pediatric intensive-care unit and a diagnostic imaging area. Henrik commented that it was something he and his wife had wanted to do since Valter was born.

Sedin's eldest son Valter plays professional soccer.

Henrik Sedin and Daniel Sedin are racehorse owners involved in harness racing. Their most successful trotter is Nahar, winner of the 2013 Elitloppet.

== Career statistics ==
=== Regular season and playoffs ===
Bold indicates led league

			Regular season					Playoffs
Season	Team	League	GP	G	A	Pts	PIM	GP	G	A	Pts	PIM
1996–97	Modo Hockey	J20	26	14	22	36	—	—	—	—	—	—
1997–98	Modo Hockey	J20	8	4	7	11	6	—	—	—	—	—
1997–98	Modo Hockey	SEL	39	1	4	5	10	7	0	0	0	0
1998–99	Modo Hockey	SEL	49	12	22	34	32	13	2	8	10	6
1999–00	Modo Hockey	SEL	50	9	38	47	22	13	5	9	14	2
2000–01	Vancouver Canucks	NHL	82	9	20	29	38	4	0	4	4	0
2001–02	Vancouver Canucks	NHL	82	16	20	36	36	6	3	0	3	0
2002–03	Vancouver Canucks	NHL	78	8	31	39	38	14	3	2	5	8
2003–04	Vancouver Canucks	NHL	76	11	31	42	32	7	2	2	4	2
2004–05	Modo Hockey	SEL	44	14	22	36	50	6	1	3	4	6
2005–06	Vancouver Canucks	NHL	82	18	57	75	56	—	—	—	—	—
2006–07	Vancouver Canucks	NHL	82	10	71	81	66	12	2	2	4	14
2007–08	Vancouver Canucks	NHL	82	15	61	76	56	—	—	—	—	—
2008–09	Vancouver Canucks	NHL	82	22	60	82	48	10	4	6	10	2
2009–10	Vancouver Canucks	NHL	82	29	**83**	**112**	48	12	3	11	14	6
2010–11	Vancouver Canucks	NHL	82	19	**75**	94	40	25	3	**19**	22	16
2011–12	Vancouver Canucks	NHL	82	14	**67**	81	52	5	2	3	5	4
2012–13	Vancouver Canucks	NHL	48	11	34	45	24	4	0	3	3	4
2013–14	Vancouver Canucks	NHL	70	11	39	50	42	—	—	—	—	—
2014–15	Vancouver Canucks	NHL	82	18	55	73	22	6	1	3	4	2
2015–16	Vancouver Canucks	NHL	74	11	44	55	24	—	—	—	—	—
2016–17	Vancouver Canucks	NHL	82	15	35	50	28	—	—	—	—	—
2017–18	Vancouver Canucks	NHL	82	3	47	50	30	—	—	—	—	—
SEL totals			182	36	86	122	114	39	8	20	28	14
NHL totals			1,330	240	830	1,070	680	105	23	55	78	58

=== International ===
Year	Team	Event	Result	GP	G	A	Pts	PIM
1997	Sweden	EJC	2nd place, silver medalist(s)	6	3	4	7	16
1998	Sweden	WJC	6th	7	0	4	4	4
1998	Sweden	EJC	1st place, gold medalist(s)	6	5	4	9	4
1999	Sweden	WJC	4th	6	3	6	9	12
1999	Sweden	WC	3rd place, bronze medalist(s)	8	0	0	0	4
2000	Sweden	WJC	5th	7	4	9	13	0
2000	Sweden	WC	7th	7	2	3	5	6
2001	Sweden	WC	3rd place, bronze medalist(s)	9	1	0	1	0
2005	Sweden	WC	4th	9	2	4	6	7
2006	Sweden	OLY	1st place, gold medalist(s)	8	3	1	4	2
2010	Sweden	OLY	5th	4	0	2	2	2
2013	Sweden	WC	1st place, gold medalist(s)	4	4	5	9	2
2016	Sweden	WCH	3rd	4	0	3	3	0
Junior totals				32	15	27	42	36
Senior totals				53	12	18	30	23

=== NHL All-Star Games ===
Year	Location	G	A	Pts
2008	Atlanta	0	2	2
2011	Raleigh	0	2	2
2012	Ottawa	1	2	3
All-star totals		1	6	7

== Awards ==
Award	Year
NHL
NHL All-Star Game	2008, 2011, 2012
Art Ross Trophy	2010
Hart Memorial Trophy	2010
NHL first All-Star team	2010, 2011
Sporting News Player of the Year	2010
King Clancy Memorial Trophy	2016, 2018
Hockey Hall of Fame	2022
International
World Championship All-Star team	2013
Sweden
Guldpucken	1999 (shared with Daniel Sedin)
Viking Award	2010
Victoria Scholarship	2011(shared with Daniel Sedin)
Vancouver Canucks
Cyrus H. McLean Trophy	2008, 2009, 2010, 2012
Cyclone Taylor Trophy	2010, 2012
Molson Cup	2010

== Records ==
- Vancouver Canucks' franchise record for all-time assists – 830 assists (surpassed Trevor Linden's 415 assists on 14 March 2010)
- Vancouver Canucks' franchise record for assists in one season – 83 (2009–10) (surpassed his own 71 assists in 2006–07)
- Vancouver Canucks' franchise record for points in one season – 112 (2009–10) (surpassed Pavel Bure's 110 points in 1992–93)
- Vancouver Canucks' franchise record for most consecutive regular season games played – 679 (streak ended by bruised rib injury 18 January 2014; sixth-longest streak in NHL history as of that date)
- Vancouver Canucks' franchise record for all-time leading scorer – 1070 points (set 15 February 2013; surpassed Markus Näslund's 756 points).

== See also ==
- List of family relations in the NHL

== Notes ==
Awards and achievements
Preceded by Ulf Dahlén	Winner of Guldpucken; 1999; With: Daniel Sedin	Succeeded by Mikael Johansson
Preceded by Evgeni Malkin	Winner of the Art Ross Trophy; 2010	Succeeded by Daniel Sedin
Preceded by Alexander Ovechkin	Winner of the Hart Memorial Trophy; 2010	Succeeded by Corey Perry
Preceded by Nicklas Bäckström	Winner of the Viking Award; 2010	Succeeded by Daniel Sedin
Sporting positions
Preceded by Daniel Sedin	Vancouver Canucks first-round draft pick 1999	Succeeded by Nathan Smith
Preceded by Roberto Luongo	Vancouver Canucks captain 2010–18	Succeeded by Bo Horvat
