= Daniel Sedin =

Swedish ice hockey player (born 1980)

- Hockey Hall of Fame, 2022
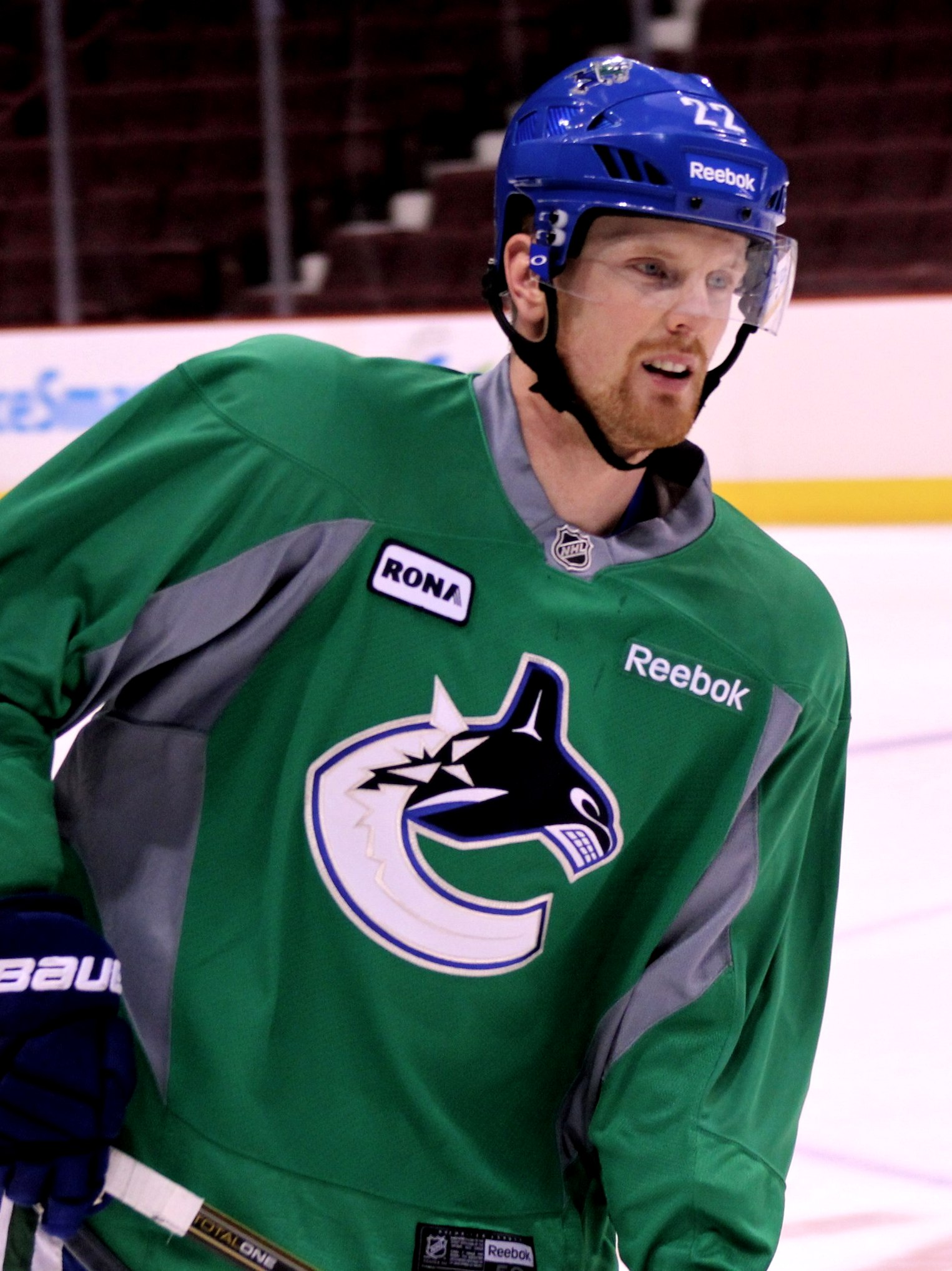
- Sedin with the Vancouver Canucks in 2012
- Born: 26 September 1980 (age 46) Örnsköldsvik, Sweden
- Height: 6 ft 1 in (185 cm)
- Weight: 190 lb (86 kg; 13 st 8 lb)
- Position: Left wing
- Shot: Left
- Played for: Modo Hockey; Vancouver Canucks
- National team: Sweden
- NHL draft: 2nd overall, 1999; Vancouver Canucks
- Playing career: 1997–2018

Daniel Hans Sedin (seh-DEEN; born 26 September 1980) is a Swedish ice hockey executive and former winger who played his entire 17-season National Hockey League (NHL) career with the Vancouver Canucks from 2000 to 2018. He and Henrik both currently serve as co-presidents of hockey operations for the Canucks. Raised in Örnsköldsvik, Sweden, Sedin and his identical twin brother Henrik played together throughout their careers; the pair were renowned for their effectiveness as a tandem. During his career, Daniel was known as a goal-scorer (150+ more career NHL goals than Henrik), while Henrik was known as a playmaker (150+ more career NHL assists than Daniel). Sedin tallied 393 goals and 648 assists in 1,306 games played in the NHL, ranking him as the Canucks' second-highest points scorer all time, behind only his brother Henrik.

Sedin began his professional career in the Swedish Hockey League with Modo Hockey in 1997 and was co-recipient, with Henrik, of the 1999 Guldpucken as Swedish player of the year. He played four seasons with Modo (including a return in 2004–05 due to the NHL lockout), helping the club to two consecutive appearances in the Le Mat Trophy Finals, in 1999 and 2000, where they lost both times. Selected second overall by the Canucks in the 1999 NHL entry draft, Sedin moved to the NHL in the 2000–01 season. He spent his entire NHL career in Vancouver, and in 2016 became the club's all-time top goal scorer. After emerging as a top player in the club during the 2005–06 season, Sedin since recorded six consecutive campaigns of at least 20 goals and 70 points. In 2011, he won the Art Ross Trophy as the League's leading point-scorer and the Ted Lindsay Award as the best player in the League, as voted by fellow players. Sedin was also nominated for the Hart Memorial Trophy as the League's most valuable player. In Sweden, he and Henrik were awarded the Victoria Scholarship as the country's athletes of the year. Alongside his brother, Daniel was inducted into the Hockey Hall of Fame in 2022.

Internationally, Sedin has competed on the Swedish national ice hockey team. In addition to being a three-time Winter Olympian, he has appeared in two European Junior Championships, two World Junior Championships and four World Championships. He won gold medals at the 2006 Winter Olympics in Turin and 2013 IIHF World Championship in Stockholm. Sedin earned a silver medal at the 2014 Olympics in Sochi and two World Championship bronze medals, at the 1999 and 2001 editions.

== Early life ==
Daniel Sedin was born on 26 September 1980, in Örnsköldsvik, Sweden, six minutes after his identical twin brother, Henrik. The pair have two older brothers, Stefan and Peter. Their father, Tommy, is a school vice-principal and also played for Modo Hockey in the 1960s, while his mother, Tora, is a nurse. Daniel began playing organized hockey with Henrik when they were eight. They did not regularly play on the same line until Daniel switched from centre to wing at 14. Daniel and Henrik both attended high school at the Nolaskolan Gymnasium in Sweden while playing professionally for Modo.

== Playing career ==
=== Modo Hockey (1997–2000) ===
Aged 16, Daniel and Henrik began their professional careers in 1997–98 with Modo Hockey of the Swedish Hockey League. Daniel recorded 12 points over 45 games during his rookie season. In his second professional year, he led Modo in scoring with 42 points in 50 games, helping the club to its second regular season title in team history. Daniel then added 12 points in 13 playoff games as Modo advanced to the Le Mat Trophy Finals, where they lost to Brynäs IF. At the end of the campaign, Daniel and Henrik were named co-recipients of the Guldpucken, the Swedish player of the year award.

The Sedins were considered top prospects for the 1999 NHL entry draft. Rated as the top draft-eligible players from Europe, they were expected to be top five selections and expressed a desire to play for the same team. As they were unlikely to be picked by the same team, their agent, Mike Barnett, president of international talent agency IMG, presented them with two options to circumvent the usual NHL draft process, allowing them to play together. The first option was for the pair to enter the 1999 Draft and not sign with their respective NHL clubs for two years, allowing them to become unrestricted free agents. This option required that they play junior hockey in North America, which was not their intention. Barnett also suggested either Henrik or Daniel opt out of the 1999 Draft, hoping that the team that selected the first twin would select the other the following year. On the possibility of the Sedins' playing for separate teams, Vancouver Canucks Scout Thomas Gradin commented, "They're good enough to play with anyone, but separately their capacity might decrease by 10 or 15 percent." Nevertheless, Henrik and Daniel both entered the 1999 Draft expecting to be selected by separate teams. However, then-Canucks general manager Brian Burke already possessed the third overall pick and through a series of transactions (Note: The Canucks acquired the 2nd overall pick to select Daniel as follows.: 1. The Canucks traded Bryan McCabe and their first-round pick in 2000 or 2001 to the Chicago Blackhawks in exchange for the Blackhawks' first round pick (4th overall).; 2. The 4th overall pick acquired from the Blackhawks was then traded along with two third-round picks in the 1999 draft (75th and 88th) to the Tampa Bay Lightning in exchange for the Lightning's first-round pick (1st overall).; 3. The 1st overall pick acquired from the Lightning was then traded to the Atlanta Thrashers for the Thrashers' first-round pick (2nd overall) and a conditional third-round pick in the 2000 draft, under the condition that then-Thrashers general manager Don Waddell not select either Sedin with the first overall pick.) he obtained the second overall pick. He used these second and third overall picks to select Daniel and Henrik, respectively. Gradin notified them of the Canucks' intentions five minutes before the Draft. Although Tampa Bay Lightning general manager Rick Dudley was ready to make Daniel his first overall choice before opening negotiations, he was convinced by Burke and Barnett that Daniel would not sign unless his brother was on the same team.

On 27 July 1999, a month following the Draft, Daniel and Henrik signed identical three-year, US$1 million contracts with the Canucks. As the contract did not require them to begin playing in Vancouver immediately, they announced on 12 August they would return to Sweden to play one more season with Modo. During the 1999–2000 season, Daniel finished second in team scoring with 45 points in 50 games, two points behind Henrik. The two brothers played on a line during the season with New York Islanders prospect Mattias Weinhandl. In the 2000 playoffs, Daniel added a team-leading eight goals and 14 points. He recorded two goals and two assists in the deciding game of the semifinals against Brynäs IF, a 6–3 win for Modo. Modo made their second straight finals appearance, where they lost the playoff championship to Djurgårdens IF in three-straight games.

=== Vancouver Canucks (2000–2018) ===
==== Early career and adjusting (2000–2006) ====
The 2000–01 season was Daniel's and (Henrik's) first season with the Canucks and in the NHL. His NHL debut was the team's first game of the 2000–01 campaign on 5 October 2000, a 6–3 loss to the Philadelphia Flyers. Daniel and Henrik became the fourth pair of twins to have played in the NHL. Three days later, Daniel scored his first career NHL goal against goaltender Dan Cloutier of the Tampa Bay Lightning. Assisted by Henrik, the goal tied the game at 4–4 with 1:13 minutes left to go in a 5–4 regulation win. On 30 November, he suffered a shoulder injury, sidelining him for four games. During his recovery, he was reprimanded by Canucks head coach Marc Crawford, who told him that playing through pain is part of being in the NHL. Later in the season, he missed an additional three games due to a back injury, shortening his rookie season to 75 games. He became the first rookie in 2000–01 to reach 20 goals when he scored on 21 March 2001, in a 1–1 tie against the Columbus Blue Jackets. Finishing the campaign with that goal total, he tied for second among League rookies in scoring with Shane Willis of the Carolina Hurricanes, behind Brad Richards of the Tampa Bay Lightning. He also had 14 assists for 34 points in total. Making his Stanley Cup playoff debut on 12 April against the Presidents' Trophy-winning and eventual Stanley Cup champion Colorado Avalanche, Daniel his first playoff assist and point with an assist on an Ed Jovanovski goal in the opening game of the first-round series, a 5–4 loss for the Canucks. He added his first NHL playoff goal in game three of the series on 16 April as the Canucks were eventually eliminated by the eventual Stanley Cup champion Avalanche in a four-game sweep. He and Henrik played primarily on the Canucks' third line. Daniel received one third-place vote from the Professional Hockey Writers' Association for the Calder Memorial Trophy as NHL rookie of the year, finishing eighth in award balloting overall.

Shortly into the 2001 off-season in May 2001, Daniel underwent surgery for a herniated disc in his lower back, from which he suffered during the 2001 World Championships in Germany. In his second NHL season, Daniel struggled with the lowest goals total of his career, with nine. The campaign included a 25-game stretch without a goal between mid-October and the end of November 2001. With 23 assists, he had 32 points overall. Vancouver finished with the eighth and final seed in the Western Conference for the second consecutive year. Facing the Presidents' Trophy-winning and eventual Stanley Cup champion Detroit Red Wings in the first round of the 2002 playoffs, they were eliminated in six games.

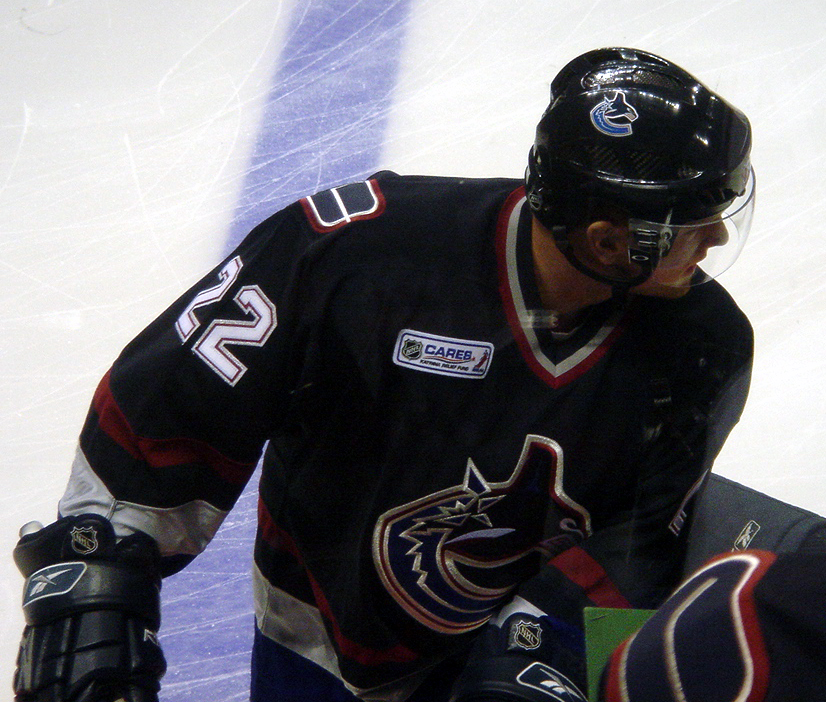
Daniel with the Canucks in October 2005

In 2002–03, Daniel continued his point-scoring pace of the previous two campaigns with 14 goals and 17 assists for 31 points in 79 games. Vancouver finished the season fourth overall in the West and advanced to the second round for the first time in Daniel's career defeating the fifth-seeded St. Louis Blues in the first round in seven games. During the 2003 playoffs, he appeared in a career-high 14 playoff games and recorded six points, as the Canucks were upset in seven games by the sixth-seeded Minnesota Wild. Daniel and Henrik were re-signed in the off-season to one-year, US$1.125 million contracts on 29 July 2003.

The Sedins began the 2003–04 season on a line with first-year player Jason King. The trio were dubbed the "Mattress Line" (two twins and a King) and formed the Canucks' second scoring line until King was reassigned to the team's minor league affiliate midway through the season. Daniel was awarded his first penalty shot on 17 January 2004, in a game against the Mighty Ducks of Anaheim. He was stopped by goaltender Jean-Sébastien Giguère as Anaheim went on to win the game 2–1. On 24 February, Daniel recorded his first NHL career hat-trick with a four-goal effort in a 4–2 win over the Detroit Red Wings. Over all 82 games played, Daniel increased his production to 18 goals, 36 assists and 54 points. The Canucks won the Northwest Division title in the regular season and were the third seed in the West Overall , before losing to the sixth-seeded Calgary Flames in the first round of the playoffs. Daniel recorded a goal and two assists in the seven-game series.

Daniel and Henrik were re-signed to one-year, US$1.25 million contracts on 10 September 2004. However, due to the 2004–05 lockout, Daniel returned to Sweden to play for Modo, along with Henrik and their Canucks teammate Markus Näslund. He finished the season with 33 points in 49 games, fourth in team scoring behind Peter Forsberg, Mattias Weinhandl and Henrik.

When NHL play resumed in 2005–06, Daniel returned to the Canucks and scored 22 goals, 49 assists and 71 points in all 82 contests played. He tied for third in team point-scoring with Todd Bertuzzi, behind Henrik and Näslund. His scoring success that season was influenced, in part, by the signing of winger Anson Carter, who played on the Sedins' line and led the team in goal-scoring. The trio matched the scoring pace of the Canucks' top line of Näslund, Bertuzzi and Brendan Morrison. Vancouver's head coach at the time, Marc Crawford, recalled that season as marking the Sedins' ascent to leaders on the team, stating that "by the end of that year, they definitely were our top guys. They had surpassed Näslund and Bertuzzi." Despite the brothers' individual achievements, the Canucks missed the playoffs for the first time in their careers as the Canucks missed the 2006 playoffs by just three points in the standings. Despite the Sedins' success with Carter in the season, the Canucks did not re-sign him after the season concluded.

==== Rise to stardom, Stanley Cup Final run, individual awards (2006–2015) ====
Daniel and Henrik re-signed with the Canucks to identical three-year, $10.75 million contracts on 30 June 2006. In the 2006–07 season, Daniel established himself as the Canucks' top scorer. He led the team with 36 goals and 48 assists for 84 points in 81 games to lead the Canucks in scoring as the Canucks returned to the playoffs having finished the season as the third seed in the Western Conference. He also tied a League record with four goals in overtime over the course of the season. On 13 January 2007, Daniel scored his 100th NHL goal in a 6–1 win over the Toronto Maple Leafs on Leafs' goaltender Andrew Raycroft. Daniel notched his second career NHL hat-trick on 6 February, scoring two goals against Edmonton Oilers goaltender Dwayne Roloson and one into an empty net. He later took the second penalty shot of his career on 8 March, against the Phoenix Coyotes. However, he was stopped once again by Curtis Joseph; Vancouver went on to win the game 4–2. Winger Taylor Pyatt, acquired in a trade from the Buffalo Sabres during the 2006 off-season, replaced Carter as the Sedins' linemate and went on to score a career-high 23 goals. On 11 April, in the opening game of the 2007 playoffs against the Dallas Stars, Daniel assisted on Henrik's quadruple-overtime goal to end the longest-ever Canucks playoff game and the sixth longest in NHL history at 138 minutes and six seconds of play. Daniel struggled to produce offensively in the playoffs, however, managing five points over 12 games as the Canucks defeated the sixth-seeded Stars in seven games before eventually being eliminated by the second-seeded and eventual Stanley Cup champion Anaheim Ducks in the second round in five games.

Daniel recorded 74 points (29 goals, 45 assists) in all 82 games in 2007–08, as the Canucks missed the playoffs for the second time in three years. He finished second in team point-scoring to Henrik and first in goals. The Sedins saw some time with Näslund on their top line during the season to form an all-Swedish forward unit.

In 2008–09, Daniel recorded 31 goals, 51 assists and 82 points in all 82 games, tying Henrik for the team lead in points. He opened the campaign being named the NHL's First Star of the Week on 13 October 2008, with a five-point effort over two games. Steve Bernier had been acquired in the 2008 off-season in another trade with the Sabres, and began the season on the top line with the Sedins. Bernier was later removed; and on 12 February 2009, Canucks head coach Alain Vigneault moved Alexandre Burrows up from the third line during a game against the Phoenix Coyotes. Late in the campaign, Daniel was named the NHL's Second Star of the Week on 30 March, after recording four goals and four assists in four games, including a game-winning goal. After the Canucks finished the season as a team as the third seed in the Western Conference, he added ten points over ten games in the 2009 playoffs, helping the third seeded Canucks sweep the sixth-seeded St. Louis Blues in the first round and advance to the second round, where they were defeated in six games by the fourth-seeded Chicago Blackhawks.

Set to become unrestricted free agents on 1 July 2009, Daniel and Henrik began negotiating with the Canucks in the 2009 off-season and were reported to have asked for 12-year, $63 million contracts in mid-June. With free agency looming, Canucks general manager Mike Gillis visited the Sedins in Sweden, where they agreed on identical five-year, $30.5 million contracts on 1 July. Four games into the 2009–10 season on 7 October, Daniel suffered the first major injury of his career, breaking his foot in a game against the Montreal Canadiens. He suffered the injury after being hit by a slapshot from teammate Alexander Edler. Although Daniel finished the game and recorded three assists on goals by Henrik, Alexandre Burrows and Steve Bernier, x-rays a few days later on 11 October revealed the fracture. He was sidelined for 18 games, returning to the ice on 22 November against the Chicago Blackhawks in which the Canucks lost 1–0 with Blackhawks' forward Bryan Bickell scoring the only goal of the game. Daniel notched his third career NHL hat-trick in a 4–2 win against the Atlanta Thrashers on 10 December. Four days later, he was named the NHL's Second Star of the Week with seven points over the course of the week. In the final game of the season, on 10 April 2010, against the Calgary Flames, Daniel scored his fourth career NHL hat-trick in a 7–3 win. All three goals were assisted by his brother Henrik, helping Henrik pass Washington Capitals forward and captain Alexander Ovechkin for the Art Ross Trophy as the NHL's leading point-scorer. The last goal was chosen by TSN in a fan-voted poll as the NHL's play of the year; Daniel received a between-the-legs tip pass from Henrik near the corner boards before beating Flames goaltender Miikka Kiprusoff with a between-the-legs deke. Daniel finished the season with 29 goals, a career-high 56 assists and 85 points and playing in 63 games while the Canucks as a team finished as the third seed in the West for the second consecutive season. His 1.35 points per game rate was third in the League behind Henrik and Ovechkin. In the subsequent 2010 playoffs, Daniel recorded ten points in the opening round against the Los Angeles Kings, including the series-winning goal on Kings’ goaltender Jonathan Quick in the late stages of Game 6 as the Canucks defeated the sixth-seeded Kings 4–2 in the game for a 4–2 series victory. Against the Chicago Blackhawks the following round, his production decreased to four points as the Canucks were eliminated in six games by the second-seeded Blackhawks for the second straight season. In the off-season, Daniel was named to the NHL second All-Star team. It marked the first time since 1973–74 that two brothers were named postseason NHL All-Stars, as Henrik had been named to the First Team. They were also chosen to appear together on the cover of EA Sports' European version of the NHL 11 video game.

On 9 October 2010, Daniel was named an alternate captain for the Canucks, who named Henrik captain during a pre-game ceremony to celebrate the team's 40th anniversary. He was joined by Ryan Kesler, Kevin Bieksa and newly signed free agent Manny Malhotra as alternates. Daniel wore the "A" during Canucks home games, along with Kesler. On 10 January 2011, Daniel was named the NHL's First Star of the Week after scoring five goals and seven points in four games. During that span, he scored the 10,000th goal in Canucks franchise history in a 3–1 win against the Calgary Flames on 5 January. Later in the month, Daniel competed in his first career NHL All-Star Game. Drafted onto Team Staal, he played with Canucks teammate Ryan Kesler opposite Henrik on Team Lidstrom. In the Skills Competition, Daniel won the shooting accuracy segment by first beating Martin Havlát to all four targets in 7.3 seconds, then defeating Patrick Kane in the final in 8.9 seconds. The following day, Daniel recorded one assist as Team Staal lost the game 11–10. Towards the end of the 2010–11 season, Daniel compiled three goals and five assists in three games to be named the NHL's Second Star of the Week on 14 March. During that month, he totalled nine goals and 12 assists in 15 games, earning him NHL Second Star of the Month honours. With a goal on Kings goaltender Jonathan Quick and an assist on a Ryan Kesler goal against the Los Angeles Kings on 31 March, Daniel became the fifth player in team history to reach the 100-point mark in one season (after Pavel Bure, Alexander Mogilny, Markus Näslund and Henrik Sedin). Prior to the Canucks' final home game of the season a week later against the Minnesota Wild on 7 April, Sedin was awarded the Cyclone Taylor Award as the team's most valuable player (MVP) and his third Cyrus H. McLean Award as the team's leading point-scorer. Finishing the campaign with a career-high 41 goals, 63 assists and 104 points in all 82 games, he won the Art Ross Trophy as the NHL's leading point-scorer. It marked the first time in NHL history that brothers led the League in scoring in back-to-back seasons, as Henrik had won the previous year. Chicago Blackhawks forwards Doug and Max Bentley also won separate scoring titles, but had achieved the feat three years apart in 1943 and 1946, respectively. He also received the Viking Award as the NHL's best Swedish player, following after Henrik who received it the year before. (Note: The award is voted on by all Swedish players in the NHL.) His 41 goals (and the 41 by teammate Ryan Kesler) led the Canucks as a team in goals and were tied for fourth in the NHL overall only behind Anaheim Ducks' forward Corey Perry, who led the league with 50 goals, Tampa Bay Lightning' forward Steven Stamkos with 45 goals and Calgary Flames' forward and captain Jarome Iginla with 43 goals, respectively. Daniel's efforts in the 2010–11 season also helped the Canucks win the Presidents' Trophy as the team with the NHL's best regular season record for the first in franchise history. Entering the 2011 playoffs, the Canucks beat the defending Stanley Cup champion and eighth-seeded Chicago Blackhawks in seven games along with the fifth-seeded Nashville Predators in six games and the second-seeded San Jose Sharks in five games in the first three rounds to advance to the Stanley Cup Finals for the first time in 17 years. Playing against the Boston Bruins, the Sedins struggled to produce in the Finals; through the series' seven games, Daniel recorded a goal and three assists for four points while twin brother Henrik recorded a goal and no assists for one point in all seven games in the series. Consequently, the Canucks as a team managed just eight goals in the entire seven game series while the Bruins recorded a combined total of 23 goals within the whole seven game series. After losing Game 6 by a 5–2 score at TD Garden in Boston on 13 June, (a game in which the Canucks had a 3–2 lead in the series and had a chance to clinch the Stanley Cup for themselves with a 4–2 series win if they had won), Daniel told Vancouver Sun reporters, "We're going to win Game 7." Two days later, they went on to lose the deciding contest 4–0 on home ice against the third-seeded Bruins for a 4–3 defeat in the series, one win short from winning the Stanley Cup. With nine goals and 11 assists for 20 points in all 25 games played, Daniel ranked fourth in playoff scoring behind Boston Bruins' forward David Krejčí, Henrik Sedin and Tampa Bay Lightning’ forward Martin St. Louis. His 99 shots on goal marked the fifth-highest single playoffs total in NHL history.

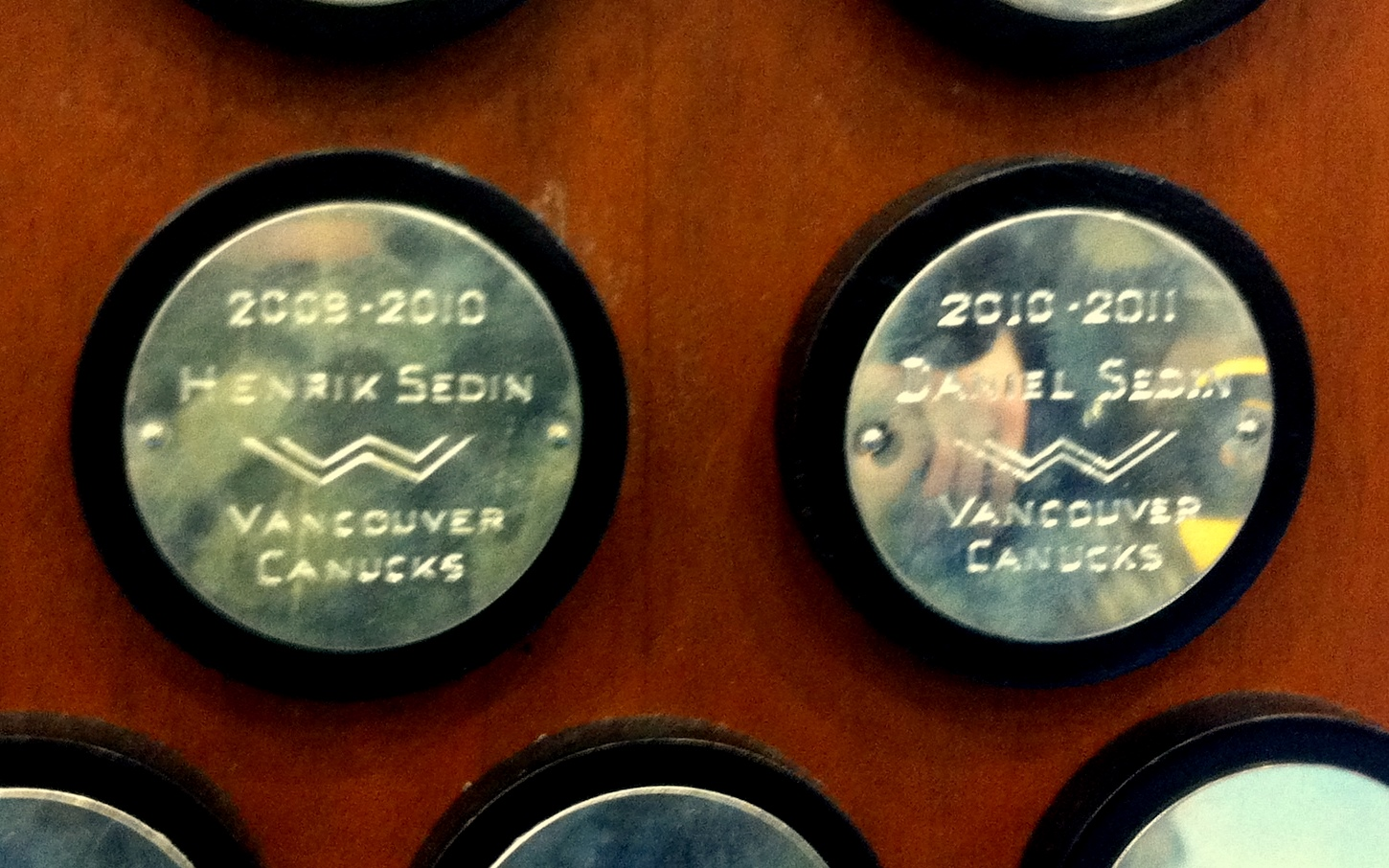
Daniel's plaque (right) on the Art Ross Trophy, beside Henrik's (left)

On 22 June, a week after the Canucks' game 7 loss, Daniel was in attendance for the NHL Awards show in Las Vegas, having been nominated for the Hart Memorial Trophy as the NHL's most valuable player, the Ted Lindsay Award as the NHL's most outstanding player and the NHL Foundation Player Award for his and Henrik's work in the Vancouver community. Daniel won the Lindsay Award over forwards Steven Stamkos of the Tampa Bay Lightning and Corey Perry of the Anaheim Ducks, respectively. In Hart Trophy voting, he finished as the first runner-up to Perry with 51 first-place ballots and 960 voting points total (16 and 83 fewer than Perry, respectively). Daniel and Henrik also lost the NHL Foundation Award to Los Angeles Kings captain forward Dustin Brown. After being named to the NHL's second All-Star team the previous year, Daniel received First Team honours with Henrik for the 2010–11 season. Returning to Sweden in the 2011 off-season, Daniel and Henrik were co-recipients of the Victoria Scholarship, as the country's athletes of the year. They became the third and fourth ice hockey players to receive the award, after Stefan Persson in 1980 and Peter Forsberg in 1994. Henrik and Daniel were presented the award, commemorated with glass plates, on 14 July, in the city of Borgholm.

At the midway point of the 2011–12 season, Daniel was named to his second consecutive NHL All-Star Game in 2012. He was one of four players representing the Canucks, including Henrik, Alexander Edler and Cody Hodgson. (Note: Hodgson was named as one of 12 designated rookies who participated in the skills competition, but not the game.) Chosen to Team Alfredsson in the All-Star fantasy draft, he recorded a goal and an assist in a 12–9 loss to Team Chára. Towards the season, Daniel sustained a concussion after receiving a hit from Chicago Blackhawks defenceman Duncan Keith during a game on 21 March 2012. With Daniel in the neutral zone and without possession of the puck, Keith hit him in the head with his elbow. After being helped off the ice by a trainer, Daniel remained in the game for a shift before leaving the contest entirely. Two days later, Keith was suspended five games for his hit by the League. Sidelined for the remainder of the regular season, Daniel finished 2011–12 with 67 points (30 goals, 37 assists) in 72 games, a drop off from his league-leading total from the previous season. Despite Daniel's injury late in the season, the Canucks won their second consecutive Presidents' Trophy and second Presidents' Trophy in franchise history altogether. He remained out of the lineup for the first three games of the 2012 playoffs, all of which the Canucks lost against the eighth-seeded and eventual Stanley Cup champion Los Angeles Kings. Returning for Game 4 on 18 April, Daniel helped the Canucks stave off a four-game sweep and force a fifth game before they were defeated in the fifth game four days later with Kings forward Jarret Stoll's overtime-winning goal for a 2–1 loss in the game and a 4–1 defeat in the series. In his two games played in the series, he recorded two assists on goals both scored by Henrik.

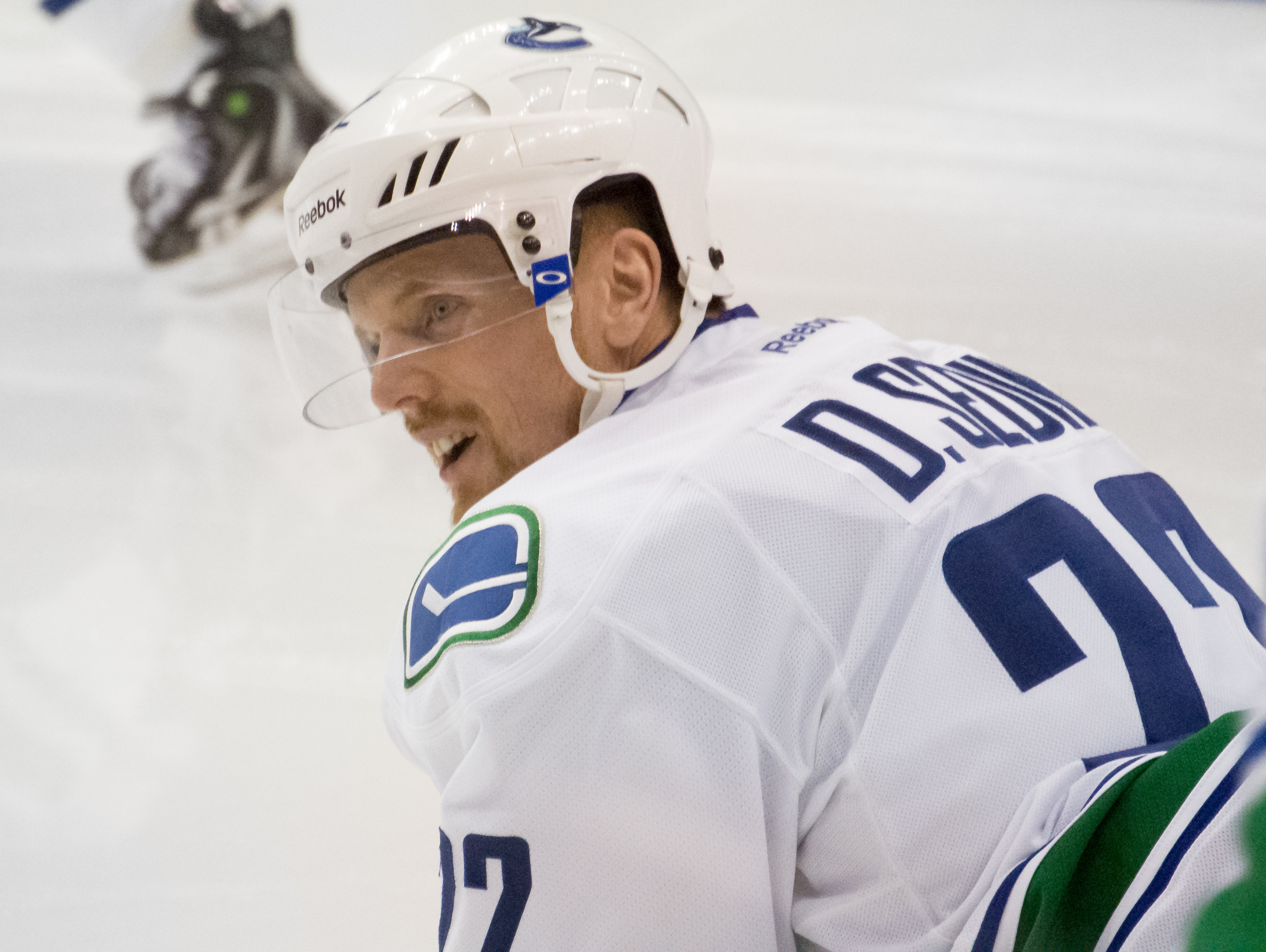
Daniel stretching in pre-game warmups prior to a game in January 2013

Due to another lockout, the 2012–13 season was delayed until January 2013 with an abbreviated 48-game regular season schedule. The Sedins this time remained in Vancouver, as they decided that would return to Modo only if the entire season again wound up cancelled. On 15 February 2013, Henrik recorded his 757th point against the Dallas Stars, surpassing Markus Näslund as the Canucks' all-time leading scorer. On 22 April, in a 3–1 win against the Chicago Blackhawks, Daniel also passed Näslund by scoring a goal on Blackhawks' goaltender Corey Crawford and two assists on goals by Henrik and Zack Kassian, ranking both of the Sedins first and second in team history in points, respectively. Playing in 47 games out of 48 game lockout-shortened season, Daniel recorded 12 goals and 28 assists for 40 points as the Canucks as a team finished as the third seed in the West. His 40 points ranked second in team scoring behind Henrik's 45 points. In the 2013 playoffs, he added three assists and no goals in a four-game sweep to the San Jose Sharks. Game 4 of the series and the series altogether ended by the San Jose Sharks on a shorthanded goal due to a penalty assessed to Daniel in overtime to complete the sweep. In pursuit of a loose puck in the defensive zone, Daniel bodychecked Sharks' forward Tommy Wingels into the boards, resulting in a boarding penalty. The call would later be the subject of controversy as it was believed by many in the media, such as National Post journalist Cam Cole, as well as teammates, such as Henrik, that Daniel had made contact with Wingels shoulder-to-shoulder, which according to NHL rules, should not result in a boarding penalty.

At the beginning of the 2013–14 season, the Sedins signed matching four-year, $28 million contract extensions with the Canucks. In 73 games, Daniel had 16 goals and 31 assists for 47 points in 2013–14. The Canucks did not qualify for the playoffs for the first time since 2008, as Daniel had a 23-game goal-scoring drought and injured his hamstring during the Heritage Classic against the Ottawa Senators, on 2 March 2014 which forced him to miss nine games. He scored multiple goals in the last game of the season on 13 April. During the second period of that game, a hit by the Calgary Flames' forward Paul Byron sent Daniel's head into the boards and ended his season. He was stretchered off the ice and briefly hospitalised.

On 23 November 2014, Daniel played his 1,000th NHL game against the Chicago Blackhawks, joining Henrik and Trevor Linden as the only players in franchise history to reach that milestone. Daniel scored his 115th power play goal as a member of the Canucks in the third period of a 5–0 victory over the visiting Pittsburgh Penguins on 7 February 2015, giving him the franchise record for power play tallies, which had been held by Näslund. On 6 April, brother Henrik recorded his 700th career assist, setting up a goal by Daniel in a Canucks victory over the Los Angeles Kings. Daniel's overall statistical performance in 2014–15 was an improvement on the previous season. In all 82 games, he had 20 goals, 56 assists and a team-high 76 points; the latter figure was good for eighth in the NHL, and earned Daniel the Cyrus H. McLean Award. The goal total exceeded his output in each of the previous two seasons, and he topped 70 points for the first time since 2010–11. The Canucks returned to the playoffs with a second-place finish in their division fifth place finish in the Western Conference after missing the playoffs the year prior. In their first-round series with the Calgary Flames, Daniel scored two goals and had two assists. His goal in the fifth game in the first round gave Vancouver an eventual 2–1 win and extended the team's season. Despite his efforts and strong production, the Flames defeated the Canucks in the opening round of the 2015 playoffs in six games.

==== Later years, continued individual success, team difficulties (2015–2018) ====
On 21 November 2015, Daniel recorded his sixth career hat-trick in a 6–3 win against the Chicago Blackhawks, cementing his spot and passing Todd Bertuzzi and Petri Skriko for fifth most hat-tricks in Canucks history and also recorded his 900th career point with an assist on a goal by Henrik. On 11 January 2016, Daniel scored in overtime to give the Canucks a 3–2 victory over the Florida Panthers against Panthers' goaltender and former teammate Roberto Luongo. The goal was his second of the game and the 346th of his career, tying him with Markus Näslund for the franchise record. Ten days later, Daniel beat Boston Bruins goaltender Tuukka Rask for a third-period goal to become the highest-scoring Canucks player; it was his first of two goals in the 4–2 win over the Bruins. Midway through the 2015–16 season, Daniel was named to the NHL All-Star Game for the third time. He played on a team representing the Pacific Division in a three-on-three tournament. Daniel contributed two goals and an assist in their first game, a 9–6 win over Team Central. In the final against Team Atlantic, he assisted on the only goal of the game in a 1–0 Team Pacific victory. For the 2015–16 campaign, Daniel had 28 goals, 33 assists and 61 points in all 82 games. Despite his continued individual productivity, the Canucks as a team finished 28th in the NHL in points and third-to-last place in the league overall, failing to reach the postseason for the second time in three years as a result.

By the 2016–17 season, their 16th with the Canucks, the Sedins were both 36 years old. They adopted a less aggressive playing style as they sought to reduce the number of risks they took on the ice. The Sedins remained among the top point-scorers on the Canucks; Daniel had 15 goals and 29 assists, and appeared in all 82 games. His total of 44 points was the fewest Daniel had tallied since the 2002–03 season. The Canucks' 69 points left them 25 behind the final playoff qualifier in their conference.

The Sedins remained with the Canucks in 2017–18, with their contracts set to expire at the end of the season. Daniel said that he and Henrik hoped to retire with the franchise. On 30 November 2017, Daniel reached the 1,000-point milestone by scoring a power play goal in a 5–3 win against the Nashville Predators against goaltender Pekka Rinne, joining Henrik as the only players to gain 1,000 points in the Canucks organization. A pregame ceremony in his honour was held on 2 December. On 2 April 2018, Daniel and Henrik announced that they would be retiring at the end of the season in a letter thanking the Canucks organization and their fans. On 5 April, the Sedins played their final game in Rogers Arena against the Arizona Coyotes. In their last home game, Daniel recorded two goals including the game winner, both of which Henrik assisted on, to defeat the Arizona Coyotes 4–3 at 2:23 in overtime. Daniel played his final game on 7 April, in a 3–2 shootout loss to the Edmonton Oilers; he retired alongside his brother Henrik at the end of the 2017–18 season after 17 seasons and 1,306 regular season games with the Vancouver Canucks. Despite their retirement, the Sedin brothers were named finalists for the King Clancy Trophy, awarded to the player who best exemplifies leadership qualities on and off the ice and gives back to his community, which they won on 20 June. The two brothers shared the award, becoming the first brothers in NHL history to share the King Clancy Trophy.

== Post-playing career ==
On 12 February 2020, Daniel's number 22 would be raised to the rafters alongside his brother Henrik's number 33 in an hour-long jersey retirement ceremony, the culmination of a week-long celebration of the twins' careers.

On 22 June 2021, it was announced that Henrik and Daniel would join the Canucks Hockey Operations department and were named Special Advisors to the General Manager.

On 30 May 2022, the Canucks announced that the Sedins had transitioned into new roles with player development, working daily on and off the ice with young players in Vancouver and Abbotsford.

On 28 June 2022, it was announced that Daniel would join his brother Henrik in being inducted into the Hockey Hall of Fame later that year, together becoming the first career Canucks to make it to the hall.

On 14 May 2026, the Canucks announced that Daniel and Henrik would be named Co-Presidents of the Canucks.

== International play ==
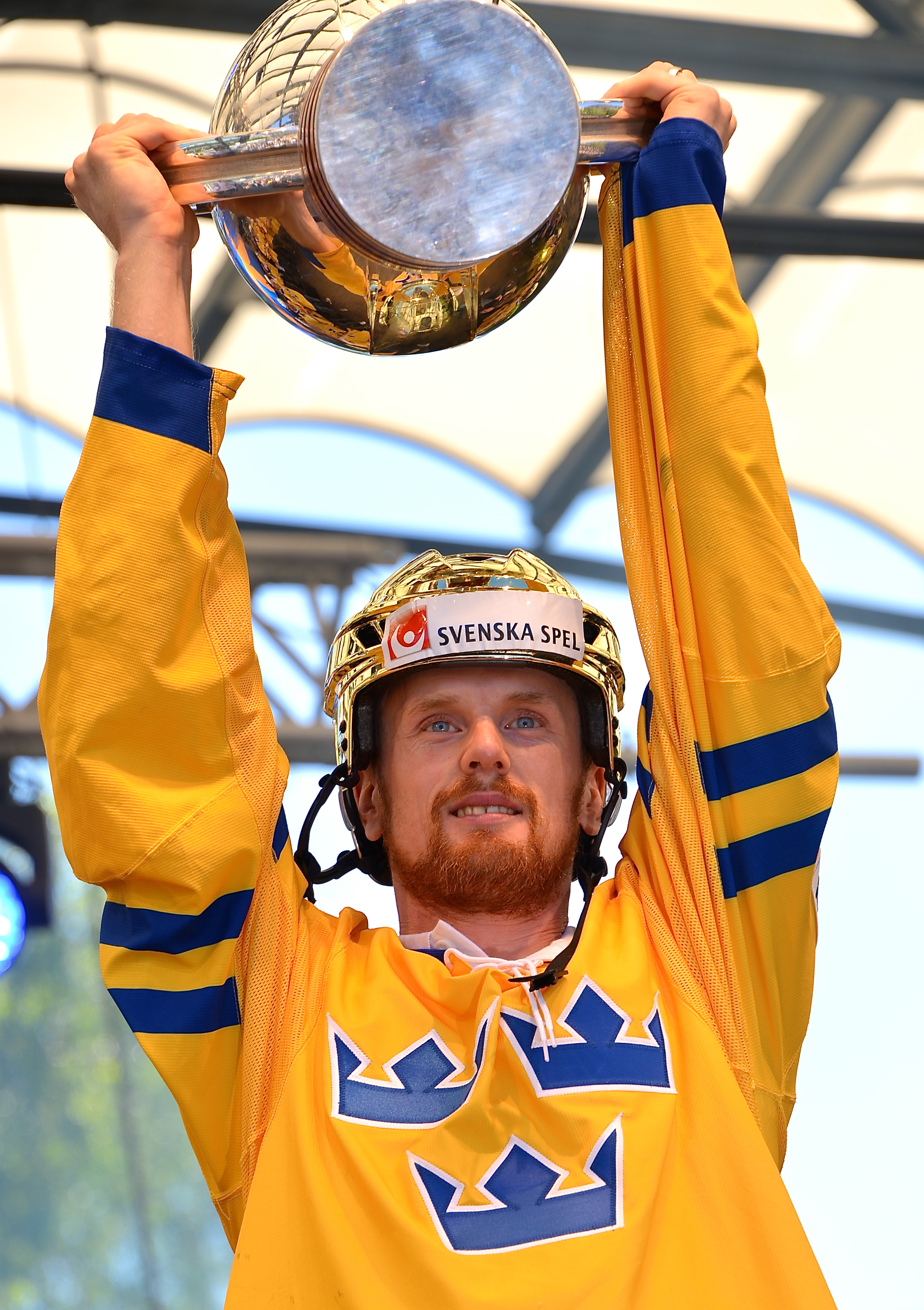
- Daniel lifts the World Championship Trophy from the 2013 IIHF World Championship

Medal record

Representing Sweden

Men's ice hockey

Winter Olympics
Gold medal – first place	2006 Turin	
Silver medal – second place	2014 Sochi	

World Championships
Gold medal – first place	2013 Sweden/Finland	
Bronze medal – third place	1999 Norway	
Bronze medal – third place	2001 Germany	

European U-18 Junior Championships
Gold medal – first place	1998	

World U17 Hockey Challenge
Silver medal – second place	1997 Canada	

Daniel made his North American debut competing for Sweden in the 1997 World U17 Hockey Challenge, held in Alberta. Leading the tournament in scoring with 26 points (nine goals and 17 assists) over six games, he helped Sweden to a silver medal. After going undefeated in five contests, they were defeated in the gold medal game by Team Ontario, 6–2.

Back in Europe, Daniel competed at the 1997 European Junior Championships, recording two goals and six points over six games. The following year, at the 1998 European Junior Championships, Sweden's final game required them to beat Russia by four goals to surpass Finland in goal differential and win the gold medal. Daniel recorded two assists as Sweden won 5–1.

In his NHL draft year, Daniel competed for Sweden at the 1999 World Junior Championships in Winnipeg, Manitoba. He recorded ten points in six games, and tied for second in tournament scoring with Daniel Tkaczuk of Canada and Scott Gomez of the United States, behind Brian Gionta of the United States. Sweden failed to medal, losing the bronze medal game against Slovakia by a score of 5–4. Later that year, Daniel made his debut for the Swedish men's team at the 1999 World Championships in Norway. He notched one assist over nine games as Sweden won the bronze medal.

In 2000, Daniel once again competed in both the World Junior and Men's Championships. At the junior tournament in Sweden, Daniel matched his previous year's output with 10 points. He was the third highest point-scorer in the tournament, behind Henrik and Milan Kraft of the Czech Republic. Again, Sweden failed to earn a medal, finishing in fifth place. At the Men's World Championships, Daniel and Henrik both recorded five points; they were the youngest players on the squad. Sweden did not achieve a medal, however, losing to Finland in the tournament quarterfinal.

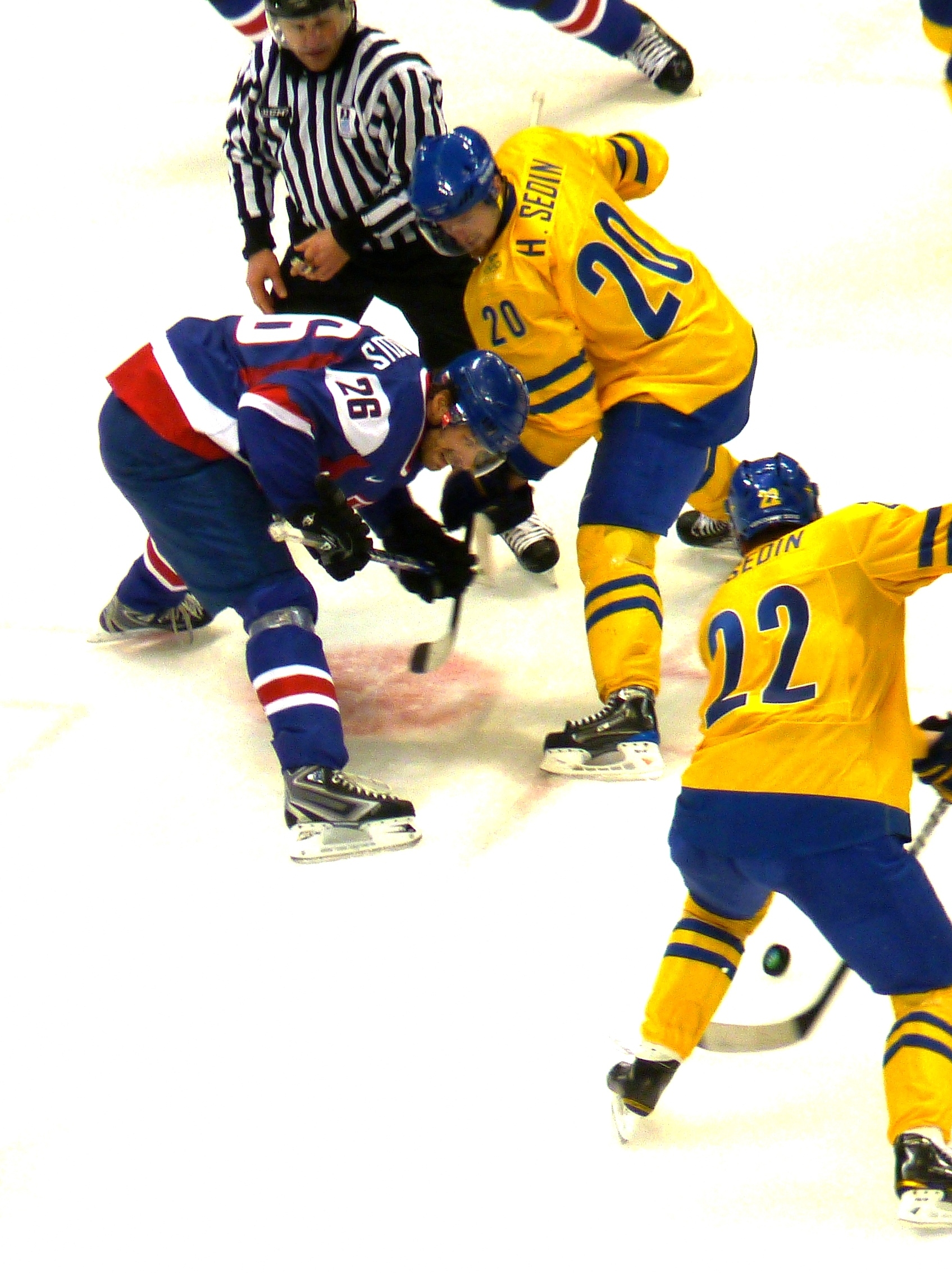
Daniel (No. 22) receives a faceoff win from brother Henrik (No. 20) against Slovak forward Michal Handzuš.

Following his rookie season with the Canucks, Daniel made his third World Championships appearance, in 2001 in Germany. He was injured midway through the tournament and had to return to Vancouver for surgery on a herniated disc in his lower back. Sweden defeated the United States 3–2 to win its second bronze medal in three years. He made a fourth tournament appearance at the 2005 World Championships in Austria. Sweden missed out on the bronze medal, losing to Russia, 6–3. Daniel had an assist in a losing effort during the bronze medal game. He finished with nine points in nine games, which tied for fourth in tournament-scoring.

On 22 December 2005, Daniel was named to the Swedish Olympic team for the 2006 Winter Olympics in Turin. He joined Henrik, Markus Näslund and Mattias Öhlund as one of four Canucks on the squad. Competing in his first Olympics, he contributed four points as Sweden won a gold medal, defeating Finland 3–2 in the final. Four years later, he was once again named to the Swedish Olympic team for the 2010 Winter Games in Vancouver. Despite going into the tournament as one of Sweden's key players (in the corresponding NHL season, he was third among Swedish players in points despite missing 19 games), he ranked seventh among team forwards in total ice time. Sweden failed to defend their gold medal from Turin, losing to Slovakia in the quarterfinal. Daniel had a goal and two assists in four games.

After the Canucks were defeated in the 2013 Stanley Cup playoffs, Daniel joined his brother in appearing at the 2013 World Championships in their home country. The Sedins helped lead Sweden to the gold medal match, where they won 5–1 over Switzerland. In four games, Daniel had six points, including four assists on power play goals during the single-elimination rounds. Daniel represented Sweden at the 2014 Winter Olympics in Sochi, while his brother did not attend due to health concerns. He played in all six of Sweden's games, scoring a goal and four assists as the Swedes ultimately lost to Canada in the gold medal game. In 2016, the Sedins participated in the World Cup of Hockey, playing together on Sweden's first line. Team Europe eliminated Sweden in the semifinal round, 3–2 in overtime. Daniel contributed two assists in four games.

== Playing style ==
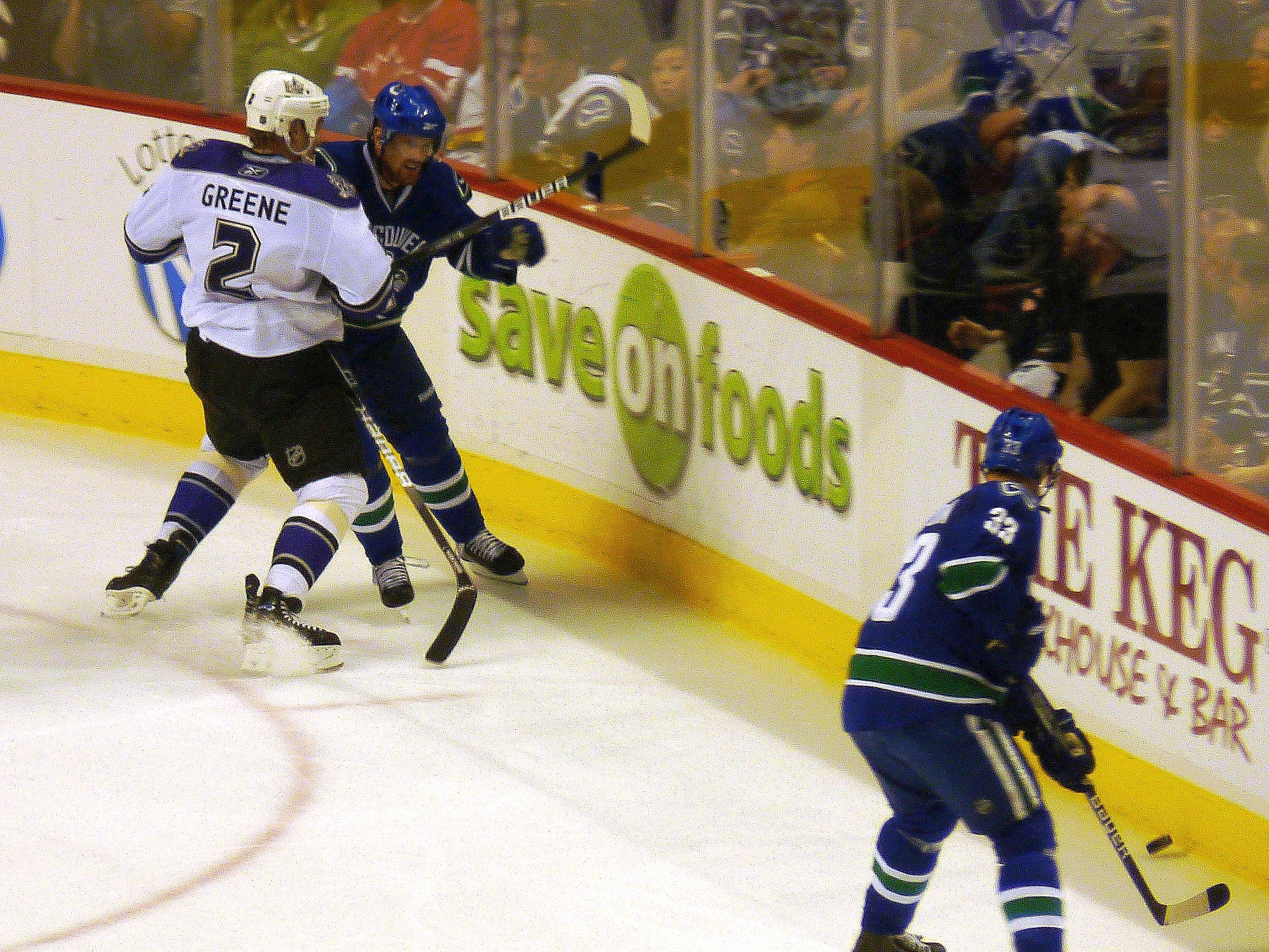
Daniel (centre left) completes a pass to Henrik (right), while being checked by Los Angeles Kings defenceman Matt Greene during the first round of the 2010 playoffs.

Throughout his career, Daniel has been known as a goal-scorer, usually finishing plays initiated by his brother, Henrik, who was known as a playmaker. However, Daniel is also a proficient playmaker like Henrik and generates many sequences with Henrik off the cycle. Daniel's familiarity with Henrik's play enhances his effectiveness; the pair are known for their ability to find each other intuitively with passes, often without looking.

With offensive skill marking the prime component of his game, Daniel is known to avoid initiating contact with opposing players. Early in their careers, he and Henrik were knocked off the puck easily. As a result, players have often taken advantage of their lack of physicality by playing aggressively against them. This once led Canucks general manager Brian Burke to publicly complain, commenting during a 2002 playoff series against the Detroit Red Wings, "'Sedin' is not Swedish for 'punch me or headlock me in a scrum.'" As their careers progressed, the Sedins have worked on their strength, improving their puck possession, allowing them to play more effectively and with increased physicality.

== Personal life ==
Daniel met his wife Marinette in his hometown Örnsköldsvik around 1998. She came with him to Vancouver upon the start of Daniel's NHL career in 2000, and the two married in 2005. After earning a bachelor's degree in psychology at the University of British Columbia Marinette became involved with the Canucks Family Education Centre, helping female immigrants transition to the English language. Together, they have two daughters, Ronja (born in 2005) and Anna (born in March 2011), and a son, Erik (born in 2008). They live in the Vancouver neighbourhood of West Point Grey during the NHL season, returning to Sweden every summer.

He is the uncle of soccer player Valter Sedin.

In March 2010, Daniel and Marinette made a joint $1.5 million donation with Henrik and his wife Johanna to the BC Children's Hospital's $200 million project for a new building. The two families requested that it be put towards a pediatric intensive-care unit and a diagnostic imaging area.

Daniel and Henrik are also involved in harness racing as both fans and owners. Their greatest success in the sport has come with Nahar, who won the Elitloppet in 2013.

== Career statistics ==
=== Regular season and playoffs ===
Bold indicates led league

			Regular season					Playoffs
Season	Team	League	GP	G	A	Pts	PIM	GP	G	A	Pts	PIM
1996–97	Modo Hockey	J20	26	26	14	40	6	—	—	—	—	—
1997–98	Modo Hockey	J20	4	3	3	6	4	—	—	—	—	—
1997–98	Modo Hockey	SEL	45	4	8	12	26	9	0	0	0	2
1998–99	Modo Hockey	SEL	50	21	21	42	20	13	4	8	12	14
1999–00	Modo Hockey	SEL	50	19	26	45	28	13	8	6	14	18
2000–01	Vancouver Canucks	NHL	75	20	14	34	24	4	1	2	3	0
2001–02	Vancouver Canucks	NHL	79	9	23	32	32	6	0	1	1	0
2002–03	Vancouver Canucks	NHL	79	14	17	31	34	14	1	5	6	8
2003–04	Vancouver Canucks	NHL	82	18	36	54	18	7	1	2	3	0
2004–05	Modo Hockey	SEL	49	13	20	33	40	6	0	3	3	6
2005–06	Vancouver Canucks	NHL	82	22	49	71	34	—	—	—	—	—
2006–07	Vancouver Canucks	NHL	81	36	48	84	36	12	2	3	5	4
2007–08	Vancouver Canucks	NHL	82	29	45	74	50	—	—	—	—	—
2008–09	Vancouver Canucks	NHL	82	31	51	82	36	10	4	6	10	8
2009–10	Vancouver Canucks	NHL	63	29	56	85	28	12	5	9	14	12
2010–11	Vancouver Canucks	NHL	82	41	63	**104**	32	25	9	11	20	32
2011–12	Vancouver Canucks	NHL	72	30	37	67	40	2	0	2	2	0
2012–13	Vancouver Canucks	NHL	47	12	28	40	18	4	0	3	3	14
2013–14	Vancouver Canucks	NHL	73	16	31	47	38	—	—	—	—	—
2014–15	Vancouver Canucks	NHL	82	20	56	76	18	6	2	2	4	0
2015–16	Vancouver Canucks	NHL	82	28	33	61	36	—	—	—	—	—
2016–17	Vancouver Canucks	NHL	82	15	29	44	32	—	—	—	—	—
2017–18	Vancouver Canucks	NHL	81	23	32	55	40	—	—	—	—	—
SEL totals			194	57	75	132	114	41	12	17	29	40
NHL totals			1,306	393	648	1,041	546	102	25	46	71	78

=== International ===
Year	Team	Event	Result	GP	G	A	Pts	PIM
1997	Sweden	EJC	2nd place, silver medalist(s)	6	2	4	6	6
1998	Sweden	WJC	6th	7	4	1	5	2
1998	Sweden	EJC	1st place, gold medalist(s)	6	3	8	11	10
1999	Sweden	WJC	4th	6	5	5	10	2
1999	Sweden	WC	3rd place, bronze medalist(s)	9	0	1	1	2
2000	Sweden	WJC	5th	7	6	4	10	0
2000	Sweden	WC	7th	7	3	2	5	8
2001	Sweden	WC	3rd place, bronze medalist(s)	3	0	2	2	0
2005	Sweden	WC	4th	9	5	4	9	2
2006	Sweden	OLY	1st place, gold medalist(s)	8	1	3	4	2
2010	Sweden	OLY	5th	4	1	2	3	0
2013	Sweden	WC	1st place, gold medalist(s)	4	1	5	6	2
2014	Sweden	OLY	2nd place, silver medalist(s)	6	1	4	5	4
2016	Sweden	WCH	3rd	4	0	2	2	0
Junior totals				32	20	22	42	16
Senior totals				54	12	25	37	20

*All statistics taken from NHL.com

=== NHL All-Star Games ===
Year	Location	G	A	Pts
2011	Raleigh	0	1	1
2012	Ottawa	1	1	2
2016	Nashville	2	2	4
All-star totals		3	4	7

== Awards ==
Award	Year
NHL
NHL second All-Star team	2010
NHL All-Star Game	2011, 2012, 2016
Art Ross Trophy	2011
Ted Lindsay Award	2011
NHL first All-Star team	2011
King Clancy Memorial Trophy	2018
Hockey Hall of Fame	2022
Sweden
Guldpucken	1999 (shared with Henrik Sedin)
Viking Award	2011
Victoria Scholarship	2011 (shared with Henrik Sedin)
Vancouver Canucks
Cyrus H. McLean Trophy	2007, 2009, 2011, 2015
Cyclone Taylor Award	2011

=== Nominations ===
Award	Year
NHL
Hart Memorial Trophy	2011

== Records ==
- Vancouver Canucks' franchise record for all-time goals – 393 goals (surpassed Markus Näslund's 346 goals on 21 January 2016)
- Vancouver Canucks' franchise record for all-time power-play goals – 138 power-play goals (surpassed Markus Näslund's 114 power-play goals on 7 February 2015)

== See also ==
- List of family relations in the NHL

== Notes ==
Awards and achievements
Preceded by Ulf Dahlén	Winner of Guldpucken; 1999; With: Henrik Sedin	Succeeded by Mikael Johansson
Preceded by Henrik Sedin	Winner of the Art Ross Trophy; 2011	Succeeded by Evgeni Malkin
Preceded by Alexander Ovechkin	Winner of the Ted Lindsay Award; 2011	Succeeded by Evgeni Malkin
Preceded by Henrik Sedin	Winner of the Viking Award; 2011	Succeeded by Erik Karlsson
Sporting positions
Preceded by Bryan Allen	Vancouver Canucks first round picks 1999	Succeeded by Henrik Sedin
