= Sedin-e Do =

Sedin-e Do ثدين 2
- Village
- Location within Iran
- Coordinates: 31°21′58″N 48°49′26″E
- Country: Iran
- Province: Khuzestan
- County: Bavi
- Bakhsh: Veys
- Rural District: Veys

Population (2006)
  - Total: 491
- Time zone: UTC+3:30 (IRST)
  - Summer (DST): UTC+4:30 (IRDT)

Sedin-e Do (Persian: ثدين 2, also Romanized as Sedīn-e Do; also known as Sedeyen-e Do, Seddeyyen-e Pā’īn, Sedeyyen-e Do, Sedeyyen-e Pā’īn, and Seyyedīn-e Do) is a village in Veys Rural District, Veys District, Bavi County, Khuzestan province, Iran. At the 2006 census, its population was 491, in 71 families.
