= Sedin-e Yek =

Sedin-e Yek ثدين 1
- Village
- Location within Iran
- Coordinates: 31°21′47″N 48°49′09″E
- Country: Iran
- Province: Khuzestan
- County: Bavi
- Bakhsh: Veys
- Rural District: Veys

Population (2006)
  - Total: 620
- Time zone: UTC+3:30 (IRST)
  - Summer (DST): UTC+4:30 (IRDT)

Sedin-e Yek (Persian: ثدين 1, also Romanized as Sedīn-e Yek; also known as Sedeyen-e Yek, Sedeyyen-e Bālā, Sedeyyen-e Yek, Seyyedīn-e Bālā, and Seyyedīn-e Yek) is a village in Veys Rural District, Veys District, Bavi County, Khuzestan province, Iran. At the 2006 census, its population was 620, in 103 families.
