= 1979–80 Hartford Whalers season =

National Hockey League team season

1979–80 Hartford Whalers
- Division: 4th Norris
- Conference: 8th Wales
- 1979–80 record: 27–34–19
- Home record: 22–12–6
- Road record: 5–22–13
- Goals for: 303
- Goals against: 312

Team information
- General manager: Jack Kelley
- Coach: Don Blackburn
- Captain: Rick Ley
- Arena: Springfield Civic Center (first 22 home games); Hartford Civic Center
- Average attendance: 9,833 (91.9%)
- Minor league affiliates: Springfield Indians (AHL); Cincinnati Stingers (CHL); Utica Mohawks (EHL)

Team leaders
- Goals: Blaine Stoughton (56)
- Assists: Mike Rogers (61)
- Points: Mike Rogers (105)
- Penalty minutes: Nick Fotiu (107)
- Plus/minus: Mike Rogers (+29)
- Wins: John Garrett (16)
- Goals against average: Al Smith (3.67)

The 1979–80 Hartford Whalers season was the Whalers' first season in the National Hockey League (NHL) and eighth overall following their previous seasons in the World Hockey Association (WHA).

The Whalers were one of four WHA franchises (with the Edmonton Oilers, Quebec Nordiques, and Winnipeg Jets) that joined the league for the 1979–80 season. Gordie Howe, Bobby Hull, and André Lacroix all three played the final NHL games of their illustrious careers with Hartford this season.

== Offseason ==
Hartford Whalers logo introduced in 1979, designed by Peter Good, a Connecticut-based graphic designer. This logo replaces the harpoon by combining a green W for Whalers with a blue whale's tail. The negative space--the white area between the W and the whale's tail--acts as an H for Hartford.

=== NHL amateur draft ===
Hartford's draft picks from the 1979 NHL entry draft which was held at the Queen Elizabeth Hotel in Montreal, on August 9, 1979.

Round	#	Player	Nationality	College/junior/club team (league)
1	18	Ray Allison	Canada	Brandon Wheat Kings (WHL)
2	39	Stuart Smith	Canada	Peterborough Petes (OMJHL)
3	60	Don Nachbaur	Canada	Billings Bighorns (WHL)
4	81	Ray Neufeld	Canada	Edmonton Oil Kings (WHL)
5	102	Mark Renaud	Canada	Niagara Falls Flyers (OMJHL)
6	123	Dave McDonald	Canada	Brandon Wheat Kings (WHL)

=== NHL Expansion Draft ===
==== Reclaimed players ====
Reclaiming of players: The 17 existing NHL teams were allowed to reclaim any rights to former WHA players they held. The four incoming franchises, however, were allowed to protect up to two goaltenders and two skaters, voiding their NHL rights. These players were considered "priority selections" in the expansion draft. Gordie Howe was one of two special cases (the other being Wayne Gretzky, for the Edmonton Oilers), as a gentlemen's agreement between the Hartford Whalers and the Detroit Red Wings, which held his rights, led to the Wings declining to reclaim Howe.

These are Hartford players whose NHL rights were reclaimed when the WHA merged with the NHL. This list is incomplete.

#	Player	Reclaimed From	Reclaimed By
2.	Alan Hangsleben (D)	Hartford Whalers	Montreal Canadiens
7.	Rick Ley (D)	Hartford Whalers	Toronto Maple Leafs
9.	George Lyle (LW)	Hartford Whalers	Detroit Red Wings
10.	Warren Miller (RW)	Hartford Whalers	New York Rangers

==== Whalers selections ====
#	Player	Drafted From	Drafted By
1.	Rick Ley (D)	Toronto Maple Leafs	Hartford Whalers
2.	Nick Fotiu (LW)	New York Rangers	Hartford Whalers
3.	Al Sims (D)	Boston Bruins	Hartford Whalers
4.	Bernie Johnston (C/LW)	Philadelphia Flyers	Hartford Whalers
5.	Brian Hill (RW)	Atlanta Flames	Hartford Whalers
6.	M. F. Schurman (LW)	Philadelphia Flyers	Hartford Whalers
7.	Rick Hodgson (D)	Atlanta Flames	Hartford Whalers
8.	Kevin Kemp (D)	Toronto Maple Leafs	Hartford Whalers
9.	Jean Savard (C)	Chicago Black Hawks	Hartford Whalers
10.	Alan Hangsleben (D)	Montreal Canadiens	Hartford Whalers
11.	Ralph Klassen (F)	Colorado Rockies	Hartford Whalers
12.	Bill Bennett (LW)	Boston Bruins	Hartford Whalers
13.	Dave Given (F)	Buffalo Sabres	Hartford Whalers
14.	Nick Beverley (D)	Colorado Rockies	Hartford Whalers
15.	Norm Lapointe G	Vancouver Canucks	Hartford Whalers
16.	Don Kozak (F)	Vancouver Canucks	Hartford Whalers

== Regular season ==
=== October ===
The Whalers played their first ever National Hockey League game on October 11, 1979, against the Minnesota North Stars at the Met Center in Bloomington, Minnesota. Gordie Roberts scored the Whalers first goal in franchise history, as the Whalers lost to the North Stars 4–1. Two nights later, on October 13, the Whalers earned their first point, as they tied the Pittsburgh Penguins 3-3. The Whalers would end their season starting four game road trip with a 0-2-2 record.

On October 19, the Whalers played their first ever home game at the Springfield Civic Center, and were led by Mark Howe, as he scored two goals, including the Whalers first ever home goal, as the Whalers defeated the Los Angeles Kings 6–3 in front of 7,626 fans. Goaltender John Garrett made 18 saves for the victory.

Hartford earned their first road win on October 31, as they defeated the Toronto Maple Leafs 4–2 at Maple Leaf Gardens in Toronto.

Overall, the Whalers had a 2-4-4 record for eight points in October, sitting in fourth place in the Norris Division.

=== November ===
After winning their final game of October, the Whalers extended their winning streak to three games, as they defeated the Toronto Maple Leafs for the second time in a row, this time by a 5–3 score at home with Gordie Howe leading the way with two goals, followed by a big 7–2 victory on the road against the Colorado Rockies to even their overall record to 4–4–4. The Black Hawks stopped the Whalers winning streak on November 9 as Chicago won the game 4–2 at the Civic Center.

On November 19, goaltender Al Smith stopped all 23 shots against the Edmonton Oilers to earn the first shutout in Whalers history, as Hartford won the game 4–0 at home.

The Whalers continued to hover around the .500 mark throughout the month, and by the end of November, they had an 8-8-6 record, earning 22 points and remained in fourth place in the Norris Division, just one point behind the Pittsburgh Penguins for third.

=== December ===
The Whalers opened the month with two ties on the road, as they skated to a 4–4 tie against the Montreal Canadiens at the Montreal Forum on December 1, followed by a 3–3 draw against the Washington Capitals at the Capital Centre to improve their record to 8–8–8 for the season.

Hartford then lost their next five games, including being shut out for the first time in team history, as on December 9 they lost 3–0 to the Edmonton Oilers at Northlands Coliseum. The Whalers snapped their five-game losing streak on December 19, with a 5–4 win over the Washington Capitals; however, the club ended December on a four-game winless streak (0–3–1).

For the month, the Whalers had a record of 1–8–3 in 12 games, and an overall record of 9–16–9, getting 27 points, as the team slipped into the Norris Division cellar, two points behind the Detroit Red Wings.

=== January ===
After the Whalers went 0–3–1 to finish December, the club opened January with a 0–4–1 record, extending their winless streak to nine games. Since December 1, the Whalers had a 1–12–4 record.

The team snapped out of their slump on January 12, as both Jordy Douglas and Blaine Stoughton scored twice, leading the Whalers to a 6–4 win over the Detroit Red Wings. This began a four-game winning streak for Hartford, as the team then defeated the Pittsburgh Penguins, 7–1, Chicago Black Hawks 5-3 and Winnipeg Jets 7–2.

The Montreal Canadiens ended the Whalers' winning streak on January 24, as they defeated Hartford 7–2, followed by a 3–2 loss to the New York Islanders two nights later; however, the Whalers won their final two games of the month, including a 6–1 victory over the Atlanta Flames, and an 8–2 win over their rivals, the Boston Bruins, to close the month.

The Whalers put together a record of 6-6-1 in January, improving to 15–22–10 for the season; however, the club remained in last place in the Norris Division, five points behind the Detroit Red Wings.

=== February ===
After dropping their first game of the month against the Atlanta Flames, the Whalers would then go on a six-game homestand, putting together a 3-1-2 record, highlighted by a 5–3 victory over the New York Islanders, led by Jordy Douglas and his four goals in their final game at the Springfield Civic Center on February 3. In their first game at the Hartford Civic Center on February 6, Mark Howe had two goals and two assists, leading the Whalers to a 7–3 win over the Los Angeles Kings in front of 14,448 fans.

After a loss on February 16 by a 5–3 score at Maple Leaf Gardens in Toronto, the Whalers put together a three-game winning streak, scoring six goals in each of their wins. The Quebec Nordiques snapped the Whalers winning streak on February 26 by defeating Hartford 9–5. Hartford lost again the next night against the Boston Bruins by a 6–3 score, however, the team ended the month with a 3–0 win over the St. Louis Blues.

The Whalers put together their first winning month in team history, as the team went 7-5-2 in 14 games, and improved to 22-27-12 on the season, earning 56 points, and back into fourth place in the Norris Division, three points ahead of the Detroit Red Wings, and only one point behind the Pittsburgh Penguins for third.

=== March/April ===
Hartford won their first game of March by a score of 6–3 against the St. Louis Blues, however, the team would then go winless in their next four games (0–2–2). The Whalers snapped out of their slump with two straight wins, defeating the Vancouver Canucks 3–1 on March 13, followed by a 4–1 victory over the Colorado Rockies two nights later on March 15.

After losing to the Minnesota North Stars 6–1 on March 16, the team would then tie their next three games, each by a 5–5 score, twice against the Montreal Canadiens and once against the Philadelphia Flyers to extend their winless skid to four games. Hartford then lost two more games in a row, which included a 7–0 loss to the Winnipeg Jets, making it a six-game winless streak.

Hartford's winless streak would extend to eight games, as they tied the Vancouver Canucks 4-4, followed by a 2–2 tie against the Los Angeles Kings. The streak would continue, as Hartford then lost 5–4 to the Toronto Maple Leafs on April 1, followed by a 6–4 loss to the Pittsburgh Penguins the following day, extending the Whalers streak to 10 games.

Hartford ended their winless streak on April 4 in convincing fashion, as the Whalers routed the Quebec Nordiques by a 9–2 score. Two nights later, in their last game of the season, the Whalers defeated the Detroit Red Wings 5–3, highlighted by a Gordie Howe goal in his last ever regular season game in front of 10,687 fans at the Civic Center.

Overall, the Whalers finished their inaugural season with a 27-34-19 record, earning 73 points, and finished in fourth place in the Norris Division, earning a playoff berth. Their 73 points tied the Pittsburgh Penguins, however, the Penguins held the tie breaker, as Pittsburgh had 30 wins, and only one point behind the second place Los Angeles Kings. The Whalers finished 10 points ahead of the last place Detroit Red Wings.

=== Gordie Howe ===
When the WHA folded in 1979, the Hartford Whalers joined the NHL and the 51-year-old Howe signed on for one final season playing in all 80 games of the schedule, helping his team to make the playoffs with fifteen goals. One particular honor was when Howe, Phil Esposito, and Jean Ratelle were selected to the mid-season all-star game by coach Scotty Bowman, as a nod to their storied careers before they retired. Howe had played in five decades of all-star games and he would skate alongside the second-youngest to ever play in the game, 19-year-old Wayne Gretzky. The Joe Louis Arena crowd gave him a standing ovation twice, lasting so long, he had to skate to the bench to stop people from cheering. He had one assist in his side's 6–3 win.

=== Final standings ===
Norris Division
	GP	W	L	T	GF	GA	Pts
**Montreal Canadiens**	80	47	20	13	328	240	107
**Los Angeles Kings**	80	30	36	14	290	313	74
**Pittsburgh Penguins**	80	30	37	13	251	303	73
**Hartford Whalers**	80	27	34	19	303	312	73
Detroit Red Wings	80	26	43	11	268	306	63

Note: GP = Games played, W = Wins, L = Losses, T = Ties, Pts = Points, GF = Goals for, GA = Goals against
Note: Teams that qualified for the playoffs are highlighted in bold.

League standings
R		Div	GP	W	L	T	GF	GA	Pts
1	**p – Philadelphia Flyers**	PTK	80	48	12	20	327	254	116
2	**y – Buffalo Sabres**	ADM	80	47	17	16	318	201	110
3	**x – Montreal Canadiens**	NRS	80	47	20	13	328	240	107
4	**Boston Bruins**	ADM	80	46	21	13	310	234	105
5	**New York Islanders**	PTK	80	39	28	13	281	247	91
6	**Minnesota North Stars**	ADM	80	36	28	16	311	253	88
7	**x – Chicago Black Hawks**	SMY	80	34	27	19	241	250	87
8	**New York Rangers**	PTK	80	38	32	10	308	284	86
9	**Atlanta Flames**	PTK	80	35	32	13	282	269	83
10	**St. Louis Blues**	SMY	80	34	34	12	266	278	80
11	**Toronto Maple Leafs**	ADM	80	35	40	5	304	327	75
12	**Los Angeles Kings**	NRS	80	30	36	14	290	313	74
13	**Pittsburgh Penguins**	NRS	80	30	37	13	251	303	73
14	**Hartford Whalers**	NRS	80	27	34	19	303	312	73
15	**Vancouver Canucks**	SMY	80	27	37	16	256	281	70
16	**Edmonton Oilers**	SMY	80	28	39	13	301	322	69
17	Washington Capitals	PTK	80	27	40	13	261	293	67
18	Detroit Red Wings	NRS	80	26	43	11	268	306	63
19	Quebec Nordiques	ADM	80	25	44	11	248	313	61
20	Winnipeg Jets	SMY	80	20	49	11	214	314	51
21	Colorado Rockies	SMY	80	19	48	13	234	308	51

Divisions: ADM – Adams, NRS – Norris, PTK – Patrick, SMY – Smythe

bold – The top 16 teams in the league qualified for the playoffs, regardless of division or conference.
x – Won division; y – Won Conference (and division); p – Won Presidents' Trophy (and conference and division)

=== Record vs. opponents ===
Norris Division record vs. opponents

==== Vs. Wales Conference ====
**Vs. Norris Division**

1979–80 NHL records
Team	**DET**	**HFD**	**LAK**	**MTL**	**PIT**	**Total**
Detroit	—	1–2–1	0–3–1	0–3–1	2–2	**3–10–3**
Hartford	2–1–1	—	2–1–1	0–1–3	2–1–1	**6–4–6**
Los Angeles	3–0–1	1–2–1	—	0–4	1–1–2	**5–7–4**
Montreal	3–0–1	1–0–3	4–0	—	2–1–1	**10–1–5**
Pittsburgh	2–2	1–2–1	1–1–2	1–2–1	—	**5–7–4**

**Vs. Adams Division**

1979–80 NHL records
Team	**BOS**	**BUF**	**MIN**	**QUE**	**TOR**	**Total**
Detroit	1–2–1	1–3	2–1–1	2–1–1	0–4	**6–11–3**
Hartford	1–2–1	1–3	0–4	1–1–2	2–2	**5–12–3**
Los Angeles	1–2–1	0–3–1	2–0–2	3–1	3–0–1	**9–6–5**
Montreal	3–1	1–1–2	3–1	2–1–1	3–1	**12–5–3**
Pittsburgh	2–2	0–4	1–3	2–2	2–2	**7–13–0**

==== Vs. Campbell Conference ====
**Vs. Patrick Division**

1979–80 NHL records
Team	**ATL**	**NYI**	**NYR**	**PHI**	**WSH**	**Total**
Detroit	1–2–1	3–1	1–3	0–3–1	2–1–1	**7–10–3**
Hartford	3–1	1–3	1–2–1	0–2–2	1–2–1	**6–10–4**
Los Angeles	1–2–1	1–2–1	1–3	0–4	1–3	**4–14–2**
Montreal	3–0–1	0–3–1	3–0–1	2–1–1	2–1–1	**10–5–5**
Pittsburgh	2–1–1	1–0–3	2–2	0–3–1	3–1	**8–7–5**

**Vs. Smythe Division**

1979–80 NHL records
Team	**CHI**	**COL**	**EDM**	**STL**	**VAN**	**WIN**	**Total**
Detroit	1−3	1−3	2−1–1	1−2−1	2−2	3−1	**10−12−2**
Hartford	1–1–2	2−1−1	2–1–1	2–2	1−1−2	2−2	**10−8−6**
Los Angeles	3−0−1	4−0	1−2−1	1−3	2−2	1−2−1	**12−9−3**
Montreal	2−2	3−1	3−1	2−2	2−2	3−1	**15−9−0**
Pittsburgh	0−2–2	2−2	1−3	1−2–1	2−1–1	4−0	**10−10−4**

== Schedule and results ==
1979–80 regular season
October

Game	Result	Date	Score	Opponent	Record	Attendance
1	L	October 11, 1979	1–4	@ Minnesota North Stars (1979–80)	0–1–0	11,214
2	T	October 13, 1979	3–3	@ Pittsburgh Penguins (1979–80)	0–1–1	8,623
3	T	October 14, 1979	3–3	@ Chicago Black Hawks (1979–80)	0–1–2	10,827
4	L	October 17, 1979	1–3	@ Buffalo Sabres (1979–80)	0–2–2	16,433
5	W	October 19, 1979	6–3	Los Angeles Kings (1979–80)	1–2–2	7,626
6	L	October 20, 1979	1–6	@ New York Islanders (1979–80)	1–3–2	14,556
7	T	October 24, 1979	2–2	@ Quebec Nordiques (1979–80)	1–3–3	10,445
8	L	October 26, 1979	1–2	New York Islanders (1979–80)	1–4–3	7,267
9	T	October 28, 1979	2–2	@ New York Rangers (1979–80)	1–4–4	17,407
10	W	October 31, 1979	4–2	@ Toronto Maple Leafs (1979–80)	2–4–4	16,485

November

Game	Result	Date	Score	Opponent	Record	Attendance
11	W	November 2, 1979	5–3	Toronto Maple Leafs (1979–80)	3–4–4	7,643
12	W	November 6, 1979	7–2	@ Colorado Rockies (1979–80)	4–4–4	7,814
13	L	November 9, 1979	2–4	Chicago Black Hawks (1979–80)	4–5–4	7,618
14	T	November 11, 1979	5–5	@ Chicago Black Hawks (1979–80)	4–5–5	9,634
15	L	November 14, 1979	2–3	@ Winnipeg Jets (1979–80)	4–6–5	12,736
16	W	November 17, 1979	4–0	Edmonton Oilers (1979–80)	5–6–5	7,627
17	L	November 18, 1979	4–5	@ Boston Bruins (1979–80)	5–7–5	11,834
18	W	November 21, 1979	5–3	Buffalo Sabres (1979–80)	6–7–5	7,627
19	T	November 24, 1979	4–4	Quebec Nordiques (1979–80)	6–7–6	7,627
20	W	November 25, 1979	4–2	Atlanta Flames (1979–80)	7–7–6	7,627
21	L	November 27, 1979	2–6	@ Philadelphia Flyers (1979–80)	7–8–6	17,077
22	W	November 30, 1979	7–5	Pittsburgh Penguins (1979–80)	8–8–6	7,627

December

Game	Result	Date	Score	Opponent	Record	Attendance
23	T	December 1, 1979	4–4	@ Montreal Canadiens (1979–80)	8–8–7	16,879
24	T	December 4, 1979	3–3	@ Washington Capitals (1979–80)	8–8–8	6,946
25	L	December 7, 1979	4–7	New York Rangers (1979–80)	8–9–8	7,627
26	L	December 9, 1979	0–3	@ Edmonton Oilers (1979–80)	8–10–8	15,423
27	L	December 11, 1979	3–5	@ Vancouver Canucks (1979–80)	8–11–8	16,165
28	L	December 12, 1979	4–7	@ Los Angeles Kings (1979–80)	8–12–8	8,732
29	L	December 15, 1979	5–6	@ Colorado Rockies (1979–80)	8–13–8	9,438
30	W	December 19, 1979	5–4	Washington Capitals (1979–80)	9–13–8	7,100
31	L	December 22, 1979	2–4	Buffalo Sabres (1979–80)	9–14–8	7,627
32	L	December 23, 1979	2–4	@ Philadelphia Flyers (1979–80)	9–15–8	17,077
33	T	December 26, 1979	4–4	Philadelphia Flyers (1979–80)	9–15–9	7,627
34	L	December 29, 1979	0–3	@ St. Louis Blues (1979–80)	9–16–9	12,175

January

Game	Result	Date	Score	Opponent	Record	Attendance
35	T	January 2, 1980	3–3	@ Edmonton Oilers (1979–80)	9–16–10	15,423
36	L	January 4, 1980	3–6	Washington Capitals (1979–80)	9–17–10	7,623
37	L	January 6, 1980	1–2	Detroit Red Wings (1979–80)	9–18–10	7,627
38	L	January 7, 1980	2–5	@ New York Rangers (1979–80)	9–19–10	17,417
39	L	January 9, 1980	2–6	@ Minnesota North Stars (1979–80)	9–20–10	9,346
40	W	January 12, 1980	6–4	@ Detroit Red Wings (1979–80)	10–20–10	19,905
41	W	January 17, 1980	7–1	Pittsburgh Penguins (1979–80)	11–20–10	7,627
42	W	January 19, 1980	5–3	Chicago Black Hawks (1979–80)	12–20–10	7,627
43	W	January 21, 1980	7–2	Winnipeg Jets (1979–80)	13–20–10	7,627
44	L	January 24, 1980	2–7	Montreal Canadiens (1979–80)	13–21–10	7,627
45	L	January 26, 1980	2–3	@ New York Islanders (1979–80)	13–22–10	14,995
46	W	January 28, 1980	6–1	Atlanta Flames (1979–80)	14–22–10	7,627
47	W	January 30, 1980	8–2	Boston Bruins (1979–80)	15–22–10	7,627

February

Game	Result	Date	Score	Opponent	Record	Attendance
48	L	February 2, 1980	3–5	@ Atlanta Flames (1979–80)	15–23–10	11,040
49	W	February 3, 1980	5–3	New York Islanders (1979–80)	16–23–10	7,627
50	W	February 6, 1980	7–3	Los Angeles Kings (1979–80)	17–23–10	14,448
51	T	February 8, 1980	4–4	Colorado Rockies (1979–80)	17–23–11	10,726
52	L	February 10, 1980	2–6	Minnesota North Stars (1979–80)	17–24–11	10,886
53	T	February 12, 1980	5–5	Vancouver Canucks (1979–80)	17–24–12	10,043
54	W	February 15, 1980	5–4	Winnipeg Jets (1979–80)	18–24–12	10,136
55	L	February 16, 1980	3–5	@ Toronto Maple Leafs (1979–80)	18–25–12	16,485
56	W	February 18, 1980	6–4	New York Rangers (1979–80)	19–25–12	14,318
57	W	February 19, 1980	6–2	Edmonton Oilers (1979–80)	20–25–12	9,955
58	W	February 23, 1980	6–5	@ Atlanta Flames (1979–80)	21–25–12	9,868
59	L	February 26, 1980	5–9	@ Quebec Nordiques (1979–80)	21–26–12	10,099
60	L	February 27, 1980	3–6	Boston Bruins (1979–80)	21–27–12	14,460
61	W	February 29, 1980	3–0	St. Louis Blues (1979–80)	22–27–12	13,622

March

Game	Result	Date	Score	Opponent	Record	Attendance
62	W	March 1, 1980	6–3	@ St. Louis Blues (1979–80)	23–27–12	14,192
63	L	March 6, 1980	3–4	@ Buffalo Sabres (1979–80)	23–28–12	16,431
64	L	March 8, 1980	5–9	@ Washington Capitals (1979–80)	23–29–12	10,521
65	T	March 9, 1980	1–1	@ Boston Bruins (1979–80)	23–29–13	13,606
66	T	March 12, 1980	4–4	@ Detroit Red Wings (1979–80)	23–29–14	19,041
67	W	March 13, 1980	3–1	Vancouver Canucks (1979–80)	24–29–14	10,879
68	W	March 15, 1980	4–1	Colorado Rockies (1979–80)	25–29–14	14,460
69	L	March 16, 1980	1–6	Minnesota North Stars (1979–80)	25–30–14	13,754
70	T	March 19, 1980	5–5	Montreal Canadiens (1979–80)	25–30–15	14,366
71	T	March 21, 1980	5–5	Philadelphia Flyers (1979–80)	25–30–16	14,460
72	T	March 22, 1980	5–5	@ Montreal Canadiens (1979–80)	25–30–17	17,893
73	L	March 24, 1980	5–7	St. Louis Blues (1979–80)	25–31–17	12,033
74	L	March 26, 1980	0–7	@ Winnipeg Jets (1979–80)	25–32–17	13,151
75	T	March 28, 1980	4–4	@ Vancouver Canucks (1979–80)	25–32–18	16,362
76	T	March 29, 1980	2–2	@ Los Angeles Kings (1979–80)	25–32–19	12,848

April

Game	Result	Date	Score	Opponent	Record	Attendance
77	L	April 1, 1980	4–5	Toronto Maple Leafs (1979–80)	25–33–19	12,845
78	L	April 2, 1980	4–6	@ Pittsburgh Penguins (1979–80)	25–34–19	11,491
79	W	April 4, 1980	9–2	Quebec Nordiques (1979–80)	26–34–19	14,356
80	W	April 6, 1980	5–3	Detroit Red Wings (1979–80)	27–34–19	10,867

Legend: Win (2 points) Loss (0 points) Tie (1 point)

== Player statistics ==
=== Skaters ===
Note: GP = Games played; G = Goals; A = Assists; Pts = Points; +/- = Plus/minus; PIM = Penalty minutes

Player	GP	G	A	Pts	+/-	PIM
Mike Rogers	80	44	61	105		10
Blaine Stoughton	80	56	44	100		16
Mark Howe	74	24	56	80		20
Dave Keon	76	10	52	62		10
Jordy Douglas	77	33	24	57		39
Pat Boutette	47	13	31	44		75
Gordie Howe	80	15	26	41		42
Al Sims	76	10	31	41		30
Gordie Roberts	80	8	28	36		89

=== Goaltending ===
Note: GP= Games played; W= Wins; L= Losses; T = Ties; SO = Shutouts; GAA = Goals against average

Player	GP	W	L	T	SO	GAA
Al Smith	30	11	10	8	2	3.66
John Garrett	52	16	24	11	0	3.98

== Playoffs ==
=== Montreal Canadiens 3, Hartford Whalers 0 ===
The Whalers opened the 1980 Stanley Cup playoffs against the Montreal Canadiens. Montreal had finished the regular season with a 47-20-13 record, earning 107 points and had the best record in the Norris Division. The Canadiens had also won the last four Stanley Cup championships.

The series opened on April 8 at the Montreal Forum in Montreal, and the Canadiens opened the scoring 5:50 into the game, when Yvon Lambert beat Whalers goaltender Al Smith to take a 1–0 lead. The Canadiens extended the lead to 2-0 when Brian Engblom beat Smith before the end of the first period. In the second period, Montreal continued to score, as Rick Chartraw made in 3-0 for the Canadiens, followed by a goal by Guy Lafleur to make it 4–0 after two periods. Yvon Lambert scored his second goal of the game midway through the third period, making it 5-0 Montreal, then the Canadiens Steve Shutt scored a powerplay goal at 13:15 of the third, making it 6-0 for the Canadiens. Hartford finally managed a goal late in the game, as Mark Howe scored with 4:59 remaining in the game, spoiling the shutout, as the final score was 6-1 for Montreal, and the Canadiens took a 1–0 series lead.

John Garrett got the start in goal for the Whalers in the second game, however, it was the Canadiens who scored early, as Doug Jarvis scored 30 seconds into the game, making it 1–0. Less than a minute later, Réjean Houle scored another for Montreal, as the Canadiens had a 2–0 lead 1:20 into the game. Before the period was over, the Canadiens added another, as Yvon Lambert had his third goal of the series, making the score 3–0. The Canadiens Gaston Gingras opened the scoring 1:33 into the second period, giving the Habs a 4–0 lead. Ray Neufeld finally got the Whalers on the board, as Marty Howe and Gordie Howe set him up with a goal, as the Whalers cut into the lead, making 4–1. The Canadiens responded quickly though, as Bob Gainey scored 24 seconds later, making it 5-1 for the Canadiens. The Whalers Gordie Roberts made it 5-2 midway through the period, however, the Canadiens continued the route, as they scored three more goals in the period, making it 8–2 after two periods. Hartford's Marty Howe and Gordie Howe each scored goals in the third period, making the final score 8-4 for Montreal, and a 2–0 series lead for the Canadiens.

The series moved the Hartford Civic Center for the third game, making it the first home playoff game in team history in front of 14,460 fans. Goaltender Al Smith returned to the Whalers net, and Hartford opened the scoring when Pat Boutette scored an unassisted shorthanded goal at the 7:03 mark of the first period, giving the Whalers their first lead of the series. The Canadiens responded five minutes later on a goal by Guy Lafleur, as the score was 1–1 after a period of play. The Whalers Tom Rowe broke the tie 1:27 into the second period, making it 2-1 for the Whalers, but once again, the Canadiens tied it 2-2, after a goal by Yvon Lambert, his fifth of the series, less than five minutes later. The two teams remained tied heading into the third period. Montreal's Réjean Houle scored early in the third, giving the Habs their first lead of the game; however, Tom Rowe of the Whalers tied the score midway through the period with his second goal of the game. Neither team could score again, sending the game into overtime. In the extra period, the Canadiens Yvon Lambert scored his second goal of the game, and sixth of the series, only 29 seconds into overtime, as Montreal won the game 4–3, and swept the series 3–0. This game marked the final game of Gordie Howe's career, as the 52-year-old retired after the season. The Whalers wouldn't return to the playoffs again until 1986.

==== NHL Preliminary round ====
===== (3) Montreal Canadiens vs. (14) Hartford Whalers =====
April 8	Hartford Whalers	1 – 6	Montreal Canadiens	Montreal Forum	Recap
No scoring		First period	5:50 – Lambert (1) – (Tremblay, Robinson); 15:52 – Engblom (1) – (Mondou, Lafleur)
No scoring		Second period	11:59 – Chartraw (1) – (Jarvis); 13:59 – Lafleur (1) – (Shutt, Larouche)
Mark Howe (1) – (Rogers) – 15:01		Third period	10:27 – Lambert (2) – (Mondou, Langway); 13:15 – pp – Shutt (1) – (Larouche, Robinson)
Smith (0-1) (31 saves / 37 shots)		Goalie stats	Herron (1-0) (20 saves / 21 shots)

April 9	Hartford Whalers	4 – 8	Montreal Canadiens	Montreal Forum	Recap
No scoring		First period	0:30 – Jarvis (1) – (Engblom); 1:20 – Houle (1) – (Lambert, Tremblay); 16:32 – Lambert (3) – (Tremblay)
Neufeld (1) – (Marty Howe, G. Howe) – 6:22; Roberts (1) – (Allison, Rogers) – 11:26		Second period	1:33 – Gingras (1) – (Jarvis, Chartraw); 6:46 – Gainey (1) – (Langway, Jarvis); 12:45 – Lambert (4) – (Gingras, Tremblay); 13:53 – Shutt (2) – (Unassisted); 19:49 – Lafleur (2) – (Houle, Robinson)
Marty Howe (1) – (Mark Howe, Rogers) – 5:55; G. Howe (1) – (Mark Howe) – 13:59		Third period	No scoring
John Garrett (0-1) (32 saves / 40 shots)		Goalie stats	Denis Herron (2-0) (23 saves / 27 shots)

April 11	Montreal Canadiens	4 – 3	OT	Hartford Whalers	Hartford Civic Center	Recap
Lafleur (3) – (Shutt, Engblom) – 12:17		First period		7:03 – sh – Pat Boutette (1) – (Unassisted)
Lambert (5) – pp – (Larouche, Napier) – 5:03		Second period		1:27 – Rowe (1) – (Keon, Alley)
Houle (2) – (Lambert, Tremblay) – 2:58		Third period		8:04 – Rowe (2) – (Roberts, Johnston)
Lambert (6) – (Tremblay, Houle) – 0:29		First overtime period		No scoring
Michel Larocque (1-0) (25 saves / 28 shots)		Goalie stats		Al Smith (0-2) (23 saves / 27 shots)

Montreal wins series 3 – 0

== Awards and records ==
1980 NHL All-Star Game

- Gordie Howe, Forward

== Transactions ==
The Whalers were involved in the following transactions during the 1979–80 season.

=== Trades ===
June 14, 1979	To New York Islanders Ralph Klassen	To Hartford Whalers Terry Richardson
December 24, 1979	To Toronto Maple Leafs Bob Stephenson	To Hartford Whalers Pat Boutette
January 17, 1980	To Washington Capitals Alan Hangsleben	To Hartford Whalers Tom Rowe
February 27, 1980	To Winnipeg Jets Future Considerations	To Hartford Whalers Bobby Hull

=== Free agents ===
Player	Former team
Chuck Luksa	Cincinnati Stingers, WHA
Greg Carroll	Detroit Red Wings
Larry Giroux	St. Louis Blues
