= 1979 Stanley Cup Final =

1979 ice hockey championship series

	1	2	3	4	5	Total
Montreal Canadiens	1	6	4	4*	4	4
New York Rangers	4	2	1	3*	1	1
- * – Denotes overtime period(s)
- Location(s): Montreal: Montreal Forum (1, 2, 5); New York City: Madison Square Garden (3, 4)
- Coaches: Montreal: Scotty Bowman; New York: Fred Shero
- Captains: Montreal: Yvan Cournoyer; New York: Dave Maloney
- Referees: Bob Myers, Dave Newell, Andy Van Hellemond
- Dates: May 13–21, 1979
- MVP: Bob Gainey (Canadiens)
- Series-winning goal: Jacques Lemaire (1:02, second)
- Hall of Famers: Canadiens: Yvan Cournoyer (1982; did not play); Ken Dryden (1983); Bob Gainey (1992); Guy Lafleur (1988); Rod Langway (2002); Guy Lapointe (1993; did not play); Jacques Lemaire (1984); Larry Robinson (1995); Serge Savard (1986); Steve Shutt (1993); Rangers: Phil Esposito (1984); Coaches: Scotty Bowman (1991); Fred Shero (2013); Officials: John D'Amico (1993); Matt Pavelich (1987); Andy Van Hellemond (1999)
- Networks: Canada: (English): CBC (French): SRC; United States: (National): NHL Network (New York City area): WOR
- Announcers: (CBC) Dan Kelly, Danny Gallivan (2), Gary Dornhoefer (1, 5), Gerry Pinder (2), Bobby Orr (3–4), and Dick Irvin Jr. (SRC) Rene Lecavalier and Gilles Tremblay (NHLN) Simulcast of CBC feed (WOR) Jim Gordon and Bill Chadwick

The 1979 Stanley Cup Final was the championship series of the National Hockey League's (NHL) 1978–79 season, and the culmination of the 1979 Stanley Cup playoffs. The New York Rangers challenged the defending champion Montreal Canadiens, who made their fourth straight appearance. It was New York's first foray into the Final since 1972. The Canadiens would win the best-of-seven series, four games to one, to win their fourth consecutive Stanley Cup championship.

This was the first of six consecutive Finals involving a team from the New York metropolitan area. The next five Finals would be contested by the Rangers' crosstown rivals the New York Islanders, who would win the first four of those series to forge a dynasty matching that of the Canadiens. By defeating the Rangers, the Canadiens completed the rare accomplishment of winning four consecutive titles in a North American league competition consisting of at least sixteen teams, and remain the only team based outside the New York metropolitan area to do so. Prior to the Canadiens' dynasty, the feat had been achieved only twice before, both times by the New York Yankees in Major League Baseball. The aforementioned Islanders are the only team to accomplish it since. This was also the last Stanley Cup Final until 2013 where both teams were from the Original Six. An Original Six club would not reach the Final again until Montreal won their next championship in 1986.

== Paths to the Final ==
Montreal defeated the Toronto Maple Leafs 4–0 and the Boston Bruins 4–3 (highlighted by the "too many men on the ice" game seven overtime win) to advance to the Final.

New York defeated the Los Angeles Kings 2–0, the Philadelphia Flyers 4–1 and the New York Islanders 4–2 to make it to the Final.

== Game summaries ==
The Canadiens won the Cup in five games, winning it on home ice for the first time since 1968. Forward Yvan Cournoyer would miss the entire postseason for Montreal as he was dealing with a herniated disc. Defenceman Guy Lapointe would miss the entire Finals due to a knee injury he had suffered in the semifinal series against the Boston Bruins.

After the Finals had ended, Jacques Lemaire, Yvan Cournoyer, and Ken Dryden retired, while head coach Scotty Bowman left the Canadiens to join the Buffalo Sabres, which would mark the end of the Canadiens' dynasty. Montreal Canadiens scored 46 total points during the Stanley Cup Final, while the New York Rangers scored 26 points in the Final.

This Final marked the second time in four years that Bowman and Fred Shero coached against each other. In 1976, they coached against each other, though Shero was with the Philadelphia Flyers.

=== Game one ===
May 13	New York Rangers	4–1	Montreal Canadiens	Montreal Forum	Recap

Scoring summary
Period	Team	Goal	Assist(s)	Time	Score
1st	NYR	Steve Vickers (5) – pp	Anders Hedberg (4)	06:28	1–0 NYR
1st	NYR	Ron Greschner (7)	Unassisted	14:27	2–0 NYR
2nd	MTL	Guy Lafleur (9)	Jacques Lemaire (10) and Yvon Lambert (3)	07:07	2–1 NYR
2nd	NYR	Phil Esposito (7) – pp	Mike McEwen (10)	09:30	3–1 NYR
2nd	NYR	Dave Maloney (3) – sh	Anders Hedberg (5) and Walt Tkaczuk (7)	12:32	4–1 NYR
3rd	None				
Penalty summary
Period	Team	Player	Penalty	Time	PIM
1st	MTL	Mario Tremblay	Slashing	04:58	2:00
1st	MTL	Rod Langway	Slashing	07:25	2:00
1st	NYR	Phil Esposito	Slashing	07:25	2:00
1st	MTL	Rod Langway	Roughing	11:52	2:00
1st	NYR	Phil Esposito	Roughing	11:52	2:00
1st	NYR	Don Maloney	Interference	18:29	2:00
2nd	NYR	Ron Greschner	Slashing	04:58	2:00
2nd	MTL	Pierre Mondou	Hooking	08:32	2:00
2nd	NYR	Mike McEwen	Holding	11:50	2:00
2nd	NYR	Dave Maloney	Cross-checking	16:21	2:00
2nd	MTL	Serge Savard	Holding	17:15	2:00
3rd	MTL	Rick Chartraw	Charging	10:58	2:00
3rd	MTL	Doug Risebrough	Misconduct	10:58	10:00
3rd	NYR	Anders Hedberg	Holding	13:34	2:00
3rd	NYR	Ron Duguay	Holding	15:14	2:00

Shots by period
Team	1	2	3	Total
New York	7	6	9	22
Montreal	7	14	11	32

=== Game two ===
May 15	New York Rangers	2–6	Montreal Canadiens	Montreal Forum	Recap

Scoring summary
Period	Team	Goal	Assist(s)	Time	Score
1st	NYR	Anders Hedberg (4)	Steve Vickers (3)	01:02	1–0 NYR
1st	NYR	Ron Duguay (4)	Mike McEwen (11) and Pat Hickey (6)	06:21	2–0 NYR
1st	MTL	Yvon Lambert (4)	Mario Tremblay (4) and Doug Risebrough (5)	08:34	2–1 NYR
1st	MTL	Guy Lafleur (10)	Jacques Lemaire (11) and Steve Shutt (4)	12:24	2–2
1st	MTL	Bob Gainey (4)	Doug Jarvis (2) and Yvon Lambert (3)	16:27	3–2 MTL
2nd	MTL	Steve Shutt (3)	Unassisted	06:51	4–2 MTL
2nd	MTL	Jacques Lemaire (8) – pp	Serge Savard (6) and Steve Shutt (5)	17:35	5–2 MTL
3rd	MTL	Mark Napier (3)	Bob Gainey (9)	04:38	6–2 MTL
Penalty summary
Period	Team	Player	Penalty	Time	PIM
1st	MTL	Doug Jarvis	High-sticking	05:00	2:00
1st	NYR	John Davidson	High-sticking	05:00	2:00
1st	MTL	Yvon Lambert	High-sticking	09:06	2:00
1st	NYR	Dave Maloney	Roughing	09:06	2:00
1st	NYR	Don Murdoch	High-sticking	12:58	2:00
1st	MTL	Yvon Lambert	Slashing	14:05	2:00
1st	NYR	Dave Maloney	Cross-checking	14:05	2:00
1st	MTL	Rick Chartraw	Slashing	17:28	2:00
1st	NYR	Phil Esposito	Slashing	17:28	2:00
1st	MTL	Bob Gainey	Slashing	18:49	2:00
1st	NYR	Ulf Nilsson	Slashing	19:18	2:00
2nd	MTL	Rod Langway	Roughing	03:02	2:00
2nd	NYR	Don Maloney	Charging	03:02	2:00
2nd	NYR	Mario Marois	Cross-checking	17:22	2:00
3rd	MTL	Steve Shutt	Cross-checking	12:27	2:00
3rd	NYR	Ron Greschner	Slashing	13:04	2:00
3rd	MTL	Mario Tremblay	Roughing	14:07	2:00

Shots by period
Team	1	2	3	Total
New York	6	9	10	25
Montreal	15	8	10	33

=== Game three ===
May 17	Montreal Canadiens	4–1	New York Rangers	Madison Square Garden	Recap

Scoring summary
Period	Team	Goal	Assist(s)	Time	Score
1st	MTL	Steve Shutt (4) – pp	Jacques Lemaire (12) and Larry Robinson (9)	07:27	1–0 MTL
1st	MTL	Doug Risebrough (1)	Yvon Lambert (11) and Serge Savard (7)	15:44	2–0 MTL
2nd	None				
3rd	NYR	Ron Duguay (5)	Unassisted	06:06	2–1 MTL
3rd	MTL	Mario Tremblay (3)	Yvon Lambert (12) and Doug Risebrough (6)	15:44	3–1 MTL
3rd	MTL	Jacques Lemaire (9)	Steve Shutt (6) and Ken Dryden (3)	17:10	4–1 MTL
Penalty summary
Period	Team	Player	Penalty	Time	PIM
1st	MTL	Rod Langway	Roughing	00:31	2:00
1st	NYR	Ron Duguay	Roughing	00:31	2:00
1st	MTL	Bob Gainey	Slashing	04:41	2:00
1st	NYR	Walt Tkaczuk	High-sticking	04:41	2:00
1st	NYR	Walt Tkaczuk	Slashing	04:41	2:00
1st	MTL	Rejean Houle	Hooking	04:46	2:00
1st	MTL	Doug Risebrough	Elbowing	08:32	2:00
1st	NYR	Mario Marois	Slashing	11:26	2:00
2nd	MTL	Bob Gainey	Slashing	02:08	2:00
2nd	MTL	Rod Langway	Roughing	12:19	2:00
2nd	NYR	Phil Esposito	Roughing	12:19	2:00
2nd	MTL	Rick Chartraw	Closing hand on puck	13:28	2:00
3rd	None				

Shots by period
Team	1	2	3	Total
Montreal	7	9	7	23
New York	4	10	6	20

=== Game four ===
May 19	Montreal Canadiens	4–3	OT	New York Rangers	Madison Square Garden	Recap

Scoring summary
Period	Team	Goal	Assist(s)	Time	Score
1st	NYR	Pat Hickey (1)	Dave Maloney (3) and Bobby Sheehan (3)	01:19	1–0 NYR
1st	MTL	Rejean Houle (1)	Bob Gainey (10)	02:39	1–1
1st	NYR	Don Murdoch (7)	Phil Esposito (12) and Pat Hickey (7)	17:03	2–1 NYR
2nd	MTL	Yvon Lambert (5)	Rejean Houle (2)	18:05	2–2
3rd	NYR	Phil Esposito (8)	Don Maloney (13) and Dave Maloney (4)	04:26	3–2 NYR
3rd	MTL	Bob Gainey (5)	Unassisted	06:27	3–3
OT	MTL	Serge Savard (2)	Guy Lafleur (13) and Steve Shutt (7)	07:25	4–3 MTL
Penalty summary
Period	Team	Player	Penalty	Time	PIM
1st	MTL	Rick Chartraw	Interference	03:34	2:00
1st	NYR	Don Maloney	Slashing	03:34	2:00
1st	MTL	Rick Chartraw	Elbowing	05:49	2:00
1st	MTL	Gilles Lupien	Tripping	10:13	2:00
1st	MTL	Rick Chartraw	Slashing	11:06	2:00
1st	NYR	Phil Esposito	Slashing	11:06	2:00
1st	NYR	Eddie Johnstone	Slashing	13:54	2:00
2nd	NYR	Dave Maloney	Hooking	01:18	2:00
2nd	MTL	Jacques Lemaire	Tripping	02:15	2:00
2nd	NYR	Mike McEwen	Holding	07:41	2:00
3rd	NYR	Ron Greschner	Tripping	07:58	2:00
OT	None				

Shots by period
Team	1	2	3	OT	Total
Montreal	11	15	11	5	42
New York	9	4	7	1	21

=== Game five ===
May 21	New York Rangers	1–4	Montreal Canadiens	Montreal Forum	Recap

Scoring summary
Period	Team	Goal	Assist(s)	Time	Score
1st	MTL	Rick Chartraw (2)	Rejean Houle (3) and Yvon Lambert (6)	10:36	1–0 MTL
1st	NYR	Carol Vadnais (2)	Don Murdoch (5)	16:52	1–1
2nd	MTL	Jacques Lemaire (10) – pp	Unassisted	01:02	2–1 MTL
2nd	MTL	Bob Gainey (6)	Doug Jarvis (3) and Rejean Houle (4)	11:01	3–1 MTL
2nd	MTL	Jacques Lemaire (11)	Rejean Houle (5)	18:49	4–1 MTL
3rd	None				
Penalty summary
Period	Team	Player	Penalty	Time	PIM
1st	NYR	Dave Maloney	Cross-checking	19:59	2:00
2nd	MTL	Rod Langway	Cross-checking	06:41	2:00
3rd	MTL	Mark Napier	Slashing	18:12	2:00
3rd	NYR	Ron Greschner	Tripping	19:41	2:00

Shots by period
Team	1	2	3	Total
New York	8	3	4	15
Montreal	9	14	8	31

== Team rosters ==
=== Montreal Canadiens ===
No.	Nat	Player	Pos	S/G	Age	Acquired	Birthplace
1	(Canada)	Michel Larocque	G	L	27	1972	Hull, Quebec
3	(Canada)	Brian Engblom	D	L	24	1975	Winnipeg, Manitoba
5	(Canada)	Guy Lapointe	D	L	31	1969	Montreal, Quebec
6	(Canada)	Pierre Mondou	C	R	23	1975	Sorel, Quebec
8	(Canada)	Doug Risebrough	C	L	25	1974	Guelph, Ontario
10	(Canada)	Guy Lafleur	RW	R	27	1971	Thurso, Quebec
11	(Canada)	Yvon Lambert	LW	L	28	1971	Drummondville, Quebec
12	(Canada)	Yvan Cournoyer (C)	RW	L	35	1963	Drummondville, Quebec
14	(Canada)	Mario Tremblay	RW	R	22	1974	Alma, Quebec
15	(Canada)	Rejean Houle	RW	L	29	1969	Rouyn, Quebec
17	(United States)	Rod Langway	D	L	22	1977	Formosa, Taiwan
18	(Canada)	Serge Savard	D	L	33	1966	Montreal, Quebec
19	(Canada)	Larry Robinson	D	L	27	1971	Winchester, Ontario
20	(Canada)	Cam Connor	RW	L	24	1978	Winnipeg, Manitoba
21	(Canada)	Doug Jarvis	C	L	24	1975	Brantford, Ontario
22	(Canada)	Steve Shutt	LW	L	26	1972	North York, Ontario
23	(Canada)	Bob Gainey	LW	L	24	1973	Peterborough, Ontario
24	(Canada)	Gilles Lupien	D	L	25	1974	Lachute, Quebec
25	(Canada)	Jacques Lemaire	C	L	33	1967	LaSalle, Quebec
27	(United States)	Rick Chartraw	D	R	24	1974	Caracas, Venezuela
28	(Canada)	Pierre Larouche	C	L	23	1977	Taschereau, Quebec
29	(Canada)	Ken Dryden	G	L	31	1964	Hamilton, Ontario
30	(Canada)	Pat Hughes	RW	R	24	1975	Calgary, Alberta
31	(Canada)	Mark Napier	LW	L	24	1975	North York, Ontario
33	(Canada)	Richard Sevigny	G	L	22	1979	Montreal, Quebec

=== New York Rangers ===
No.	Nat	Player	Pos	S/G	Age	Acquired	Birthplace
1	(Canada)	Wayne Thomas	G	L	31	1977	Ottawa, Ontario
3	(Canada)	Dave Farrish	D	L	22	1976	Wingham, Ontario
4	(Canada)	Ron Greschner	D	L	24	1974	Goodsoil, Saskatchewan
5	(Canada)	Carol Vadnais	D	L	33	1975	Montreal, Quebec
6	(United States)	Bobby Sheehan	C	L	30	1979	Weymouth, Massachusetts
8	(Canada)	Steve Vickers	LW	L	28	1971	Toronto, Ontario
10	(Canada)	Ron Duguay	C	R	21	1977	Sudbury, Ontario
11	(Sweden)	Ulf Nilsson	C	R	29	1978	Nynäshamn, Sweden
12	(Canada)	Don Maloney	LW	L	20	1978	Lindsay, Ontario
14	(Canada)	Don Murdoch	RW	R	22	1976	Cranbrook, British Columbia
15	(Sweden)	Anders Hedberg	RW	L	28	1978	Örnsköldsvik, Sweden
16	(Canada)	Pat Hickey	LW	L	25	1973	Brantford, Ontario
17	(Canada)	Ed Johnstone	RW	R	25	1974	Brandon, Manitoba
18	(West Germany)	Walt Tkaczuk	C	L	33	1967	Emsdetten, West Germany
19	(United States)	Nick Fotiu	LW	L	26	1976	Staten Island, New York
23	(Canada)	Lucien DeBlois	RW	R	21	1977	Joliette, Quebec
24	(Canada)	Pierre Plante	RW	L	27	1978	Valleyfield, Quebec
25	(Canada)	Mario Marois	D	R	21	1977	L'Ancienne-Lorette, Quebec
26	(Canada)	Dave Maloney (C)	D	L	22	1974	Kitchener, Ontario
27	(Canada)	Mike McEwen	D	L	22	1976	Hornepayne, Ontario
30	(Canada)	John Davidson	G	L	26	1975	Ottawa, Ontario
77	(Canada)	Phil Esposito	C	L	37	1975	Sault Ste. Marie, Ontario

== Stanley Cup engraving ==
The 1979 Stanley Cup was presented to Canadiens acting captain Serge Savard by NHL President John Ziegler following the Canadiens 4–1 win over the Rangers in game five.

The following Canadiens players and staff had their names engraved on the Stanley Cup

1978–79 Montreal Canadiens

=== Players ===
Centres

- 6 Pierre Mondou
- 8 Doug Risebrough
- 21 Doug Jarvis
- 25 Jacques Lemaire
- 28 Pierre Larouche

Wingers

- 10 Guy Lafleur
- 11 Yvon Lambert
- 12 Yvan Cournoyer* (Captain)
- 14 Mario Tremblay
- 15 Rejean Houle
- 20 Cam Connor
- 22 Steve Shutt
- 23 Bob Gainey
- 30 Pat Hughes
- 31 Mark Napier

Defencemen

- 3 Brian Engblom
- 5 Guy Lapointe
- 17 Rod Langway
- 18 Serge Savard
- 19 Larry Robinson
- 24 Gilles Lupien
- 27 Rick Chartraw

Goaltenders

- 1 Michel Bunny Larocque
- 29 Ken Dryden
- 33 Richard Sevigny †
- * Did not play or dress in the Final. Name engraved on Stanley Cup despite not officially qualifying.^{[A]}
- † Did not play in the Final. Spare dressed in the Final due to an injury to the regular backup goaltender.^{[B]}

=== Coaching and administrative staff ===
- Jacques Courtois (President), Sam Pollock (Director)
- Irving Grundman (Vice President/General Manager), Jean Beliveau (Vice President - Director of Cooperate Affairs)
- William Scotty Bowman (Head Coach), Claude Ruel (Director of Player Development)
- Al MacNeil (Director of Player Personnel), Morgan McCammon (Director)
- Ron Caron (Asst. General Manager/Director of Communication), Eddy Palchak (Trainer)
- Pierre Meilleur (Asst. Trainer)

=== Stanley Cup engraving ===
- ^{^[A]} #12 Yvan Cournoyer played only 18 regular season games. He missed the rest of the season due to a back injury. His name was still put on the cup, even though he did not qualify. Serge Savard served as interim captain while Cournoyer was injured.
- ^{^[B]} #33 Richard Sevigny (G) – had his name engraved on the Stanley Cup, before he played his first NHL game. He was dressed in the Final when Michel Larocque was injured in pre-game warm-up for game two. Sevigny joined Montreal full-time, the next season after Ken Dryden retired.
- #26 Dan Newman played 16 regular season games, but did not qualify to be on the cup. He was dressed for one game in the quarterfinals, but did not play
- Floyd Curry changed roles from Assistant Manager to Director of Scouting. Name was left off the Stanley Cup.
- American Rod Langway was born in Taiwan. This makes Langway first and only player to win the Stanley Cup born in Taiwan (Republic of China).

=== Members of Montreal Canadiens 1976 to 1979 dynasty ===
- Players: Rick Chartraw, Yvan Cournoyer, Ken Dryden, Bob Gainey, Doug Jarvis, Guy Lafleur, Yvon Lambert, Guy Lapointe, Michel Larocque, Jacques Lemaire, Doug Risebrough, Larry Robinson, Serge Savard, Steve Shutt, Mario Tremblay
- Non players: Jacques Courtois, Sam Pollock, Jean Beliveau, Scotty Bowman, Claude Ruel, Eddie Palchak, Pierre Meilleur, Ron Caron, Floyd Curry

== Broadcasting ==
The Stanley Cup Final were produced by CBC, who carried the game in Canada and were shown in the United States on the NHL's syndicated package. Dan Kelly called the play-by-play for Games 1, 3, 4, and 5 entirely and split game 2 with Danny Gallivan. Gary Dornhoefer served as color commentator for Games 1 and 5, Gerry Pinder served as color commentator for Game 2 only, Bobby Orr served as color commentator from Madison Square Garden. Meanwhile, Dick Irvin Jr. served as color commentator for the entire Final series and hosted the games in Montreal, Dave Hodge and Howie Meeker hosted the games in New York City. ABC was contracted to televise game seven. Since the series ended in five games, the contract was void.

== See also ==
- 1978–79 NHL season

Preceded by Montreal Canadiens; 1978	Montreal Canadiens; Stanley Cup champions 1979	Succeeded by New York Islanders; 1980
