= Lucien DeBlois =

Canadian ice hockey player (born 1957)

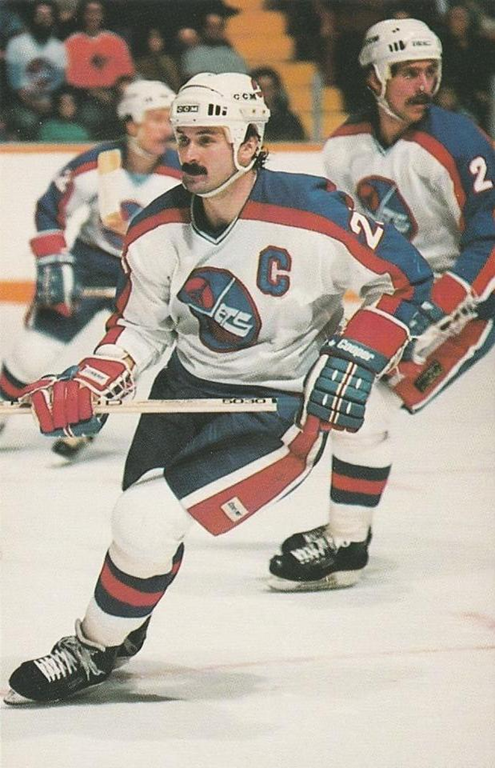
- Born: June 21, 1957 (age 69) Joliette, Quebec, Canada
- Height: 5 ft 11 in (180 cm)
- Weight: 200 lb (91 kg; 14 st 4 lb)
- Position: Right wing
- Shot: Right
- Played for: New York Rangers; Colorado Rockies; Winnipeg Jets; Montreal Canadiens; Quebec Nordiques; Toronto Maple Leafs
- National team: Canada
- NHL draft: 8th overall, 1977; New York Rangers
- WHA draft: 9th overall, 1977; Quebec Nordiques
- Playing career: 1977–1992

Joseph Lucien Jean Gonzague DeBlois (born June 21, 1957) is a Canadian former professional ice hockey right wing / centre. He featured in the 1979 Stanley Cup Final with the New York Rangers and the 1986 Stanley Cup Final with the Montreal Canadiens.

== Career ==
Born in Joliette, Quebec, DeBlois was selected in the 1977 NHL entry draft by the New York Rangers in the first round, eighth overall. He was chosen over Mike Bossy by Rangers' general manager John Ferguson, Sr. because "Bossy didn't check enough for the NHL." DeBlois was a top Canadian major junior player in the mid-seventies, where he tallied excellent numbers with the Sorel Black Hawks. He also won the Michel Brière Memorial Trophy as the league MVP during his last junior season in the Quebec Major Junior Hockey League.

In his National Hockey League (NHL) career DeBlois played for six teams, the New York Rangers (1977–1979 and 1986–1989), Colorado Rockies (1979–1981), Winnipeg Jets (1981–1984 and 1992), Montreal Canadiens (1984–1986), Quebec Nordiques (1989–1990) and Toronto Maple Leafs (1990–1992). He won a Stanley Cup in 1986 with the Canadiens and also participated in the Stanley Cup Final in 1979 with the Rangers. During his career, DeBlois captained the Jets for two seasons and was an assistant for others (Montreal, New York and Winnipeg). He scored his 200th NHL career goal in the 1986–87 season against his former team, the Montreal Canadiens.

After his playing career, DeBlois became a broadcaster for RDS, later becoming an amateur scout for the Nordiques and later was added to a six-man coaching roster under Pierre Pagé with the same team in the spring of 1993 (André Savard, Don Jackson, Jacques Cloutier, Clément Jodoin, and DeBlois). He was the original coach and general manager of Moncton's first QMJHL franchise in 1995–1996, the Moncton Alpines. DeBlois later became an assistant coach with the Kansas City Blades in the International Hockey League (IHL) for two seasons.

Following his stint in the IHL, DeBlois was hired as a professional scout for the Mighty Ducks of Anaheim from 1998 to 2005 and worked as a scout with the Vancouver Canucks from 2005 to 2016.

DeBlois currently resides in Montreal. He has three sons; Christian, Simon (twins) and Dominic. Dominic DeBlois, the youngest, played in the QMJHL during four seasons for Chicoutimi and Rouyn-Noranda where he became team captain his last two years of eligibility.

== Career statistics ==
=== Regular season and playoffs ===
			Regular season					Playoffs
Season	Team	League	GP	G	A	Pts	PIM	GP	G	A	Pts	PIM
1973–74	Sorel Éperviers	QMJHL	56	30	35	65	53	13	6	5	11	7
1974–75	Sorel Éperviers	QMJHL	72	46	53	99	62	—	—	—	—	—
1975–76	Sorel Éperviers	QMJHL	70	56	55	111	102	5	1	1	2	32
1976–77	Sorel Éperviers	QMJHL	72	56	78	134	111	—	—	—	—	—
1977–78	New York Rangers	NHL	71	22	8	30	27	3	0	0	0	2
1978–79	New Haven Nighthawks	AHL	7	4	6	10	6	—	—	—	—	—
1978–79	New York Rangers	NHL	62	11	17	28	26	9	2	0	2	4
1979–80	New York Rangers	NHL	6	3	1	4	7	—	—	—	—	—
1979–80	Colorado Rockies	NHL	70	24	19	43	36	—	—	—	—	—
1980–81	Colorado Rockies	NHL	74	26	16	42	78	—	—	—	—	—
1981–82	Winnipeg Jets	NHL	65	25	27	52	87	4	2	1	3	4
1982–83	Winnipeg Jets	NHL	79	27	27	54	69	3	0	0	0	5
1983–84	Winnipeg Jets	NHL	80	34	45	79	50	3	0	1	1	4
1984–85	Montreal Canadiens	NHL	51	12	11	23	20	8	2	4	6	4
1985–86	Montreal Canadiens	NHL	61	14	17	31	48	11	0	0	0	7
1986–87	New York Rangers	NHL	40	3	8	11	27	2	0	0	0	2
1987–88	New York Rangers	NHL	74	9	21	30	103	—	—	—	—	—
1988–89	New York Rangers	NHL	73	9	24	33	107	4	0	0	0	4
1989–90	Quebec Nordiques	NHL	70	9	8	17	45	—	—	—	—	—
1990–91	Quebec Nordiques	NHL	14	2	2	4	13	—	—	—	—	—
1990–91	Toronto Maple Leafs	NHL	38	10	12	22	30	—	—	—	—	—
1991–92	Toronto Maple Leafs	NHL	54	8	11	19	39	—	—	—	—	—
1991–92	Winnipeg Jets	NHL	11	1	2	3	2	5	1	0	1	2
NHL totals			993	249	276	525	814	52	7	6	13	38

=== International ===
Year	Team	Event	GP	G	A	Pts	PIM
1981	Canada	WC	8	3	0	3	4

Preceded by Don Murdoch	New York Rangers first-round draft pick 1977	Succeeded by Ron Duguay
Preceded by Rick Green	Quebec Nordiques first-round draft pick 1977	Succeeded by Michel Goulet
Preceded by Dave Christian	Winnipeg Jets captain 1982–84	Succeeded by Dale Hawerchuk
Preceded by None	Head coach of the Moncton Wildcats; 1995–96	Succeeded by Bill Riley
