= Steve Shutt =

Canadian ice hockey player (born 1952)

- Hockey Hall of Fame, 1993
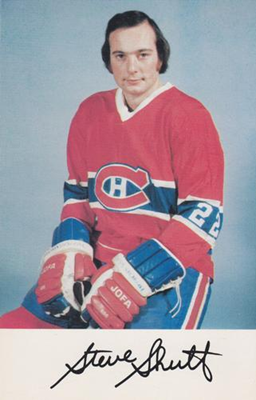
- Shutt with the Montreal Canadiens in 1976
- Born: July 1, 1952 (age 74) North York, Ontario, Canada
- Height: 5 ft 11 in (180 cm)
- Weight: 180 lb (82 kg; 12 st 12 lb)
- Position: Left wing
- Shot: Left
- Played for: Montreal Canadiens; Los Angeles Kings
- NHL draft: 4th overall, 1972; Montreal Canadiens
- Playing career: 1972–1985

Stephen John Shutt (born July 1, 1952) is a Canadian former professional ice hockey player who played 13 seasons in the National Hockey League (NHL) from 1972 to 1985, 12 seasons for the Montreal Canadiens and 1 season for the Los Angeles Kings. He is in the Hockey Hall of Fame. While playing for the Canadiens he won the Stanley Cup five times: in 1973, 1976, 1977, 1978, and 1979.

== Playing career ==
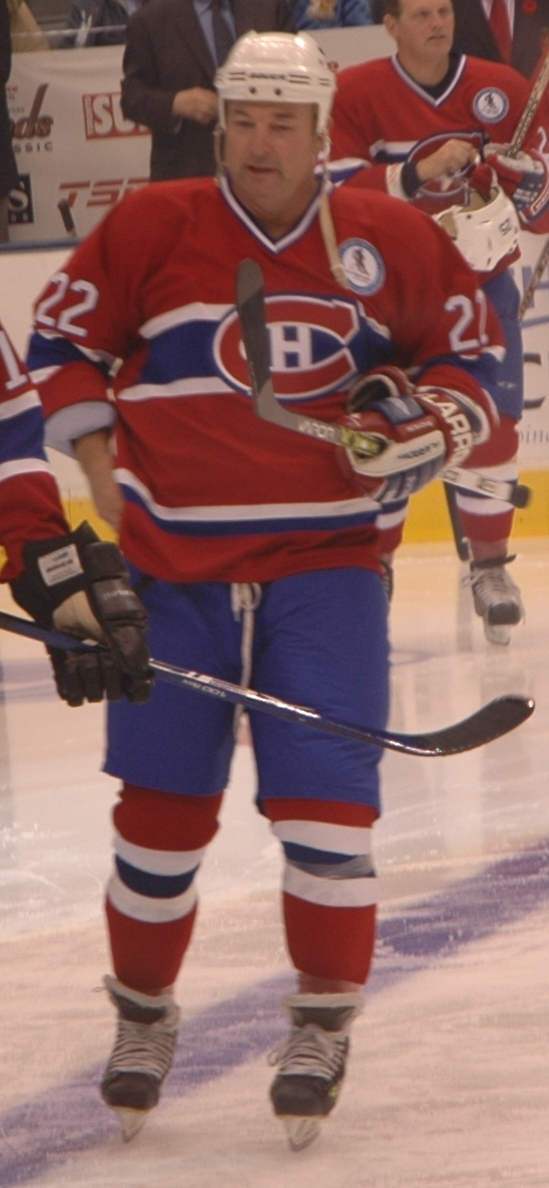
Shutt in 2008

As a youth, he played in the 1964 and 1965 Quebec International Pee-Wee Hockey Tournaments with minor ice hockey teams from Toronto.

Partnered with Jacques Lemaire and Guy Lafleur on the Montreal Canadiens, to form the top line in the NHL, Shutt became the first left-winger in NHL history to score 60 goals in a single season, with the historic goal being scored on April 3, 1977, against the Washington Capitals.

During his career with Montreal, he was named to the NHL First All-Star team in 1977, and the NHL Second All-Star team in 1978 and 1980.

== Playing style ==
"They talk a lot about ‘garbage goals’, but it didn’t come by luck....The timing of Steve Shutt was unbelievable. He was always at the right place, and that’s not luck. You could have ten rebounds and not be there, but Steve Shutt was there ten times. He was always there to put the puck in the net."

— Serge Savard on Shutt’s positional awareness

Despite being of relatively small stature and possessing average skating ability, Shutt had remarkable spatial awareness and was very positionally sound. He was consistently able to get into dead areas of coverage on the ice, either by anticipating where the puck was going to be or by arriving late on a play.

He was also a masterful goal scorer, possessing a diverse arsenal of shots. His wrist shot was known for its superior accuracy, and Shutt was noted for his ability to consistently pick corners or hit the five-hole.

“Gerry Cheevers was actually in terror of this guy".

— Don Cherry on the accuracy and effectiveness of Shutt’s slapshot

Moreover, Shutt was famous for the power and unusual level of accuracy found in his slap shot, which he could get off in full stride while coming down the wing. Shutt was frequently able to let fly one or two steps inside the offensive zone and beat goalies clean. New York Islanders goaltender Billy Smith, who faced the Habs many times in the 70s and 80s, gave credit to the superiority of Shutt's slapshot:

“He had a great shot. Unbelievable shot. He’d come across the blue line and he could tee it up better than anybody. And he was accurate, which is scary for someone with a slap shot.”

In addition to having a superb slap shot on the fly, the precision and consistency of Shutt's one timer also earned him a spot as the point man on the Habs’ power play over many of the defencemen on his team.

However, the most noteworthy part of Shutt's game was his ability to collect rebounds and turn them into so-called “garbage goals”. As Shutt himself claimed, “I’m the only guy that could score goals and make it boring”. This particular element of Shutt's playing style fit him into a long line of “garbage collectors” who earned a majority of their goals from around the crease – players like Nels Stewart and Gordie Drillon before him, his contemporary Phil Esposito and skaters of a later generation such as Corey Perry. He had exceptional hand-eye coordination, and a deft knack for converting loose pucks into deflections – even batting in pucks which had bounced one or two feet off the ice. Noted author and sports columnist Brian McFarlane claimed that Shutt had the fastest set of hands around the net during his time in the NHL, with an ability to corral the puck with his skates as well as protect it with his body and stick. Shutt gave a simple explanation for how he developed his excellent reflexes as a child: “We always had about fifteen kids on the ice, and so there wasn’t a lot of room. And so you had to be really quick with your hands.”

== Career statistics ==
=== Regular season and playoffs ===
			Regular season					Playoffs
Season	Team	League	GP	G	A	Pts	PIM	GP	G	A	Pts	PIM
1968–69	North York Rangers	MetJHL	17	10	17	27	—	—	—	—	—	—
1968–69	Toronto Marlboros	OHA-Jr.	—	—	—	—	—	5	1	3	4	2
1969–70	Toronto Marlboros	OHA-Jr.	49	11	14	25	93	18	10	9	19	13
1970–71	Toronto Marlboros	OHA-Jr.	62	70	53	123	85	13	11	11	22	20
1971–72	Toronto Marlboros	OHA-Jr.	58	63	49	112	60	10	8	6	14	12
1972–73	Nova Scotia Voyageurs	AHL	6	4	1	5	2	—	—	—	—	—
1972–73	Montreal Canadiens	NHL	50	8	8	16	24	1	0	0	0	0
1973–74	Montreal Canadiens	NHL	70	15	20	35	17	6	5	3	8	9
1974–75	Montreal Canadiens	NHL	77	30	35	65	40	9	1	6	7	4
1975–76	Montreal Canadiens	NHL	80	45	34	79	47	13	7	8	15	2
1976–77	Montreal Canadiens	NHL	80	60	45	105	28	14	8	10	18	2
1977–78	Montreal Canadiens	NHL	80	49	37	86	24	15	9	8	17	20
1978–79	Montreal Canadiens	NHL	72	37	40	77	31	11	4	7	11	6
1979–80	Montreal Canadiens	NHL	77	47	42	89	34	10	6	3	9	6
1980–81	Montreal Canadiens	NHL	77	35	38	73	51	3	2	1	3	4
1981–82	Montreal Canadiens	NHL	78	31	24	55	40	—	—	—	—	—
1982–83	Montreal Canadiens	NHL	78	35	22	57	26	3	1	0	1	0
1983–84	Montreal Canadiens	NHL	63	14	23	37	29	11	7	2	9	8
1984–85	Montreal Canadiens	NHL	10	2	0	2	9	—	—	—	—	—
1984–85	Los Angeles Kings	NHL	59	16	25	41	10	3	0	0	0	4
NHL totals			930	424	393	817	410	99	50	48	98	65

=== International ===
Year	Team	Event	GP	G	A	Pts	PIM
1976	Canada	CC	6	1	2	3	8

== Post-playing career ==
Following his playing career, Shutt worked as a television hockey commentator. From 1993 to 1997, he worked on the Canadiens coaching staff as an assistant coach on both the staffs of Jacques Demers and Mario Tremblay.

Following his assistant coaching duties with the Montreal Canadiens, Shutt joined Toromont Industries as Manager of Recreational Facilities and Services and has been with them for the past 19 years.

On November 22, 2003, Shutt participated with the Canadiens' old-timers against the Edmonton Oilers oldtimers in the Heritage Classic, the first outdoor game in the history of the NHL played at Commonwealth Stadium, in Edmonton, Alberta. Shutt also tours Canada and the U.S. as a playing member of the Oldtimers' Hockey Challenge, raising money for charitable causes.

In North York, he was a middle school classmate of rock star and bassist Geddy Lee. The two connected over music, and they both picked up bass guitars, both being influenced by Denny Gerrard, the bassist of Toronto psychedelic rock band The Paupers. Lee credits Shutt with introducing him to his future Rush bandmate, guitarist Alex Lifeson.

== See also ==
- List of NHL players with 100-point seasons

Preceded by Murray Wilson	Montreal Canadiens first-round draft pick 1972	Succeeded by Michel Larocque
Preceded by Reggie Leach	NHL Goal Leader; 1977	Succeeded by Guy Lafleur
