= Rick Green (ice hockey) =

Canadian ice hockey player (born 1956)

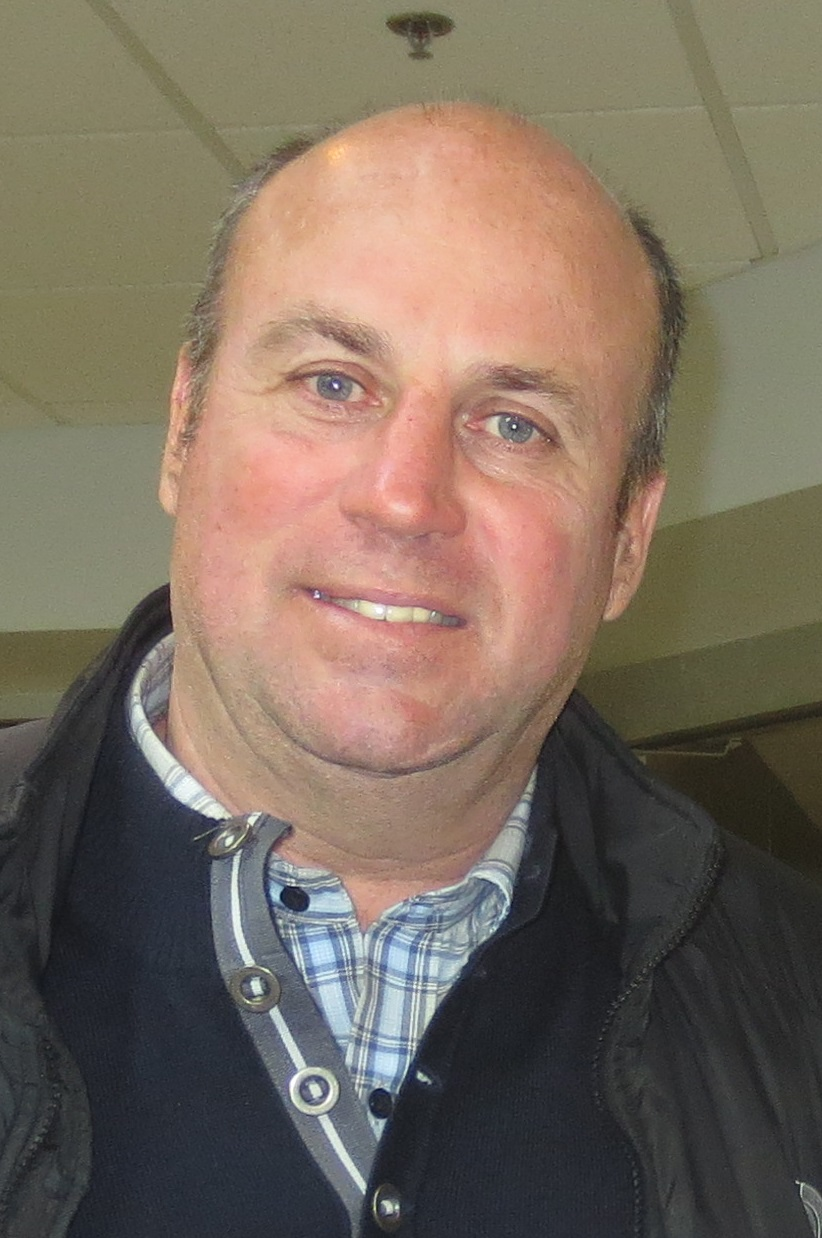
- Green in 2013
- Born: February 20, 1956 (age 70) Belleville, Ontario, Canada
- Height: 6 ft 3 in (191 cm)
- Weight: 200 lb (91 kg; 14 st 4 lb)
- Position: Defence
- Shot: Left
- Played for: Washington Capitals; Montreal Canadiens; Detroit Red Wings; New York Islanders
- National team: Canada
- NHL draft: 1st overall, 1976; Washington Capitals
- WHA draft: 10th overall, 1976; Quebec Nordiques
- Playing career: 1976–1992
Medal record
Representing Canada
Ice hockey
World Championships
| Bronze medal – third place | 1982 Finland |

Richard Douglas Green (born February 20, 1956) is a Canadian former ice hockey defenceman. He won the 1986 Stanley Cup with the Montreal Canadiens.

== Biography ==
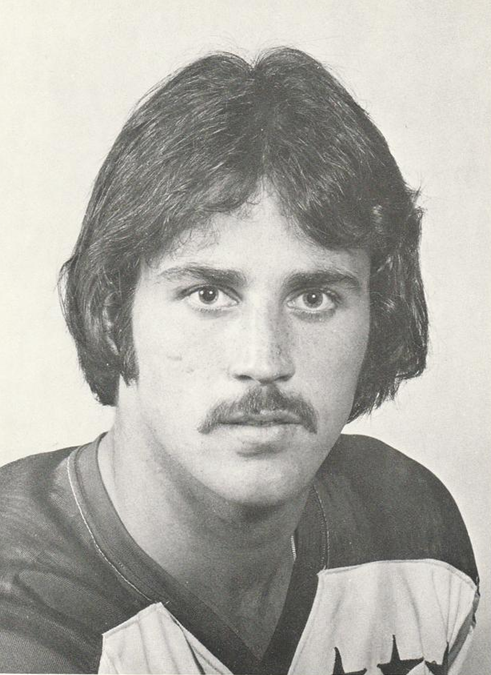
Rick Green in 1977 photo for Washington Capitals

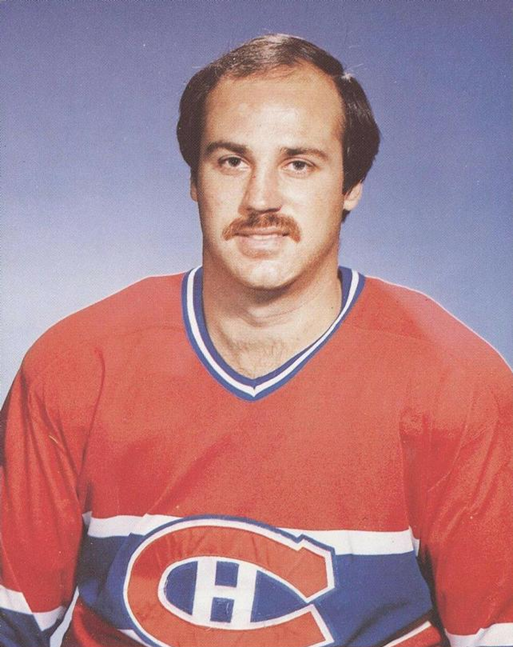
1982 photo of Rick Green for Montreal Canadiens

As a youth, Green played in the 1968 and 1969 Quebec International Pee-Wee Hockey Tournaments with minor ice hockey teams from Toronto.

Green spent his junior career with the London Knights of the OHA, where he earned the Max Kaminsky Trophy for Most Outstanding Defenceman as selected by league general managers in 1976.

Green was drafted first overall by the Washington Capitals in the 1976 NHL Amateur Draft. He was also drafted 10th overall by the Quebec Nordiques in the 1976 WHA Amateur Draft.

In September 1982, after spending his first six seasons with the Washington Capitals, Green and Ryan Walter were traded to the Montreal Canadiens as part of a six-player blockbuster deal in exchange for Brian Engblom, Doug Jarvis, Rod Langway and Craig Laughlin. Green went on to win his first Stanley Cup ring with the Canadiens in 1986.

Following his stint with the Canadiens, Green would spend the final seasons of his career as a member of the Detroit Red Wings and the New York Islanders, before retiring as a player in 1991.

Green later made the transition from a player to an assistant coach, where he served on the coaching staffs for two of his former teams, the Islanders and the Canadiens, as well as the Los Angeles Kings.

== Career statistics ==
=== Regular season and playoffs ===
| | | | Regular season | | | | | Playoffs |
| Season | Team | League | GP | G | A | Pts | PIM | GP | G | A | Pts | PIM |
|---|---|---|---|---|---|---|---|---|---|---|---|---|
| 1972–73 | London Knights | OHA-Jr. | 8 | 0 | 1 | 1 | 2 | — | — | — | — | — |
| 1973–74 | London Knights | OHA-Jr. | 65 | 6 | 30 | 36 | 45 | — | — | — | — | — |
| 1974–75 | London Knights | OMJHL | 65 | 8 | 45 | 53 | 68 | — | — | — | — | — |
| 1975–76 | London Knights | OMJHL | 61 | 13 | 47 | 60 | 69 | 5 | 1 | 0 | 1 | 4 |
| 1976–77 | Washington Capitals | NHL | 45 | 3 | 12 | 15 | 16 | — | — | — | — | — |
| 1977–78 | Washington Capitals | NHL | 60 | 5 | 14 | 19 | 67 | — | — | — | — | — |
| 1978–79 | Washington Capitals | NHL | 71 | 8 | 33 | 41 | 62 | — | — | — | — | — |
| 1979–80 | Washington Capitals | NHL | 71 | 4 | 20 | 24 | 52 | — | — | — | — | — |
| 1980–81 | Washington Capitals | NHL | 65 | 8 | 23 | 31 | 91 | — | — | — | — | — |
| 1981–82 | Washington Capitals | NHL | 65 | 3 | 25 | 28 | 93 | — | — | — | — | — |
| 1982–83 | Montreal Canadiens | NHL | 66 | 2 | 24 | 26 | 58 | 3 | 0 | 0 | 0 | 2 |
| 1983–84 | Montreal Canadiens | NHL | 7 | 0 | 1 | 1 | 7 | 15 | 1 | 2 | 3 | 33 |
| 1984–85 | Montreal Canadiens | NHL | 77 | 1 | 18 | 19 | 30 | 12 | 0 | 3 | 3 | 14 |
| 1985–86 | Montreal Canadiens | NHL | 46 | 3 | 2 | 5 | 20 | 18 | 1 | 4 | 5 | 8 |
| 1986–87 | Montreal Canadiens | NHL | 72 | 1 | 9 | 10 | 10 | 17 | 0 | 4 | 4 | 8 |
| 1987–88 | Montreal Canadiens | NHL | 59 | 2 | 11 | 13 | 33 | 11 | 0 | 2 | 2 | 2 |
| 1988–89 | Montreal Canadiens | NHL | 72 | 1 | 14 | 15 | 25 | 21 | 1 | 1 | 2 | 6 |
| 1989–90 | HC Merano | Serie A | 9 | 2 | 6 | 8 | 2 | 10 | 3 | 6 | 9 | 4 |
| 1990–91 | Detroit Red Wings | NHL | 65 | 2 | 14 | 16 | 24 | 3 | 0 | 0 | 0 | 0 |
| 1991–92 | New York Islanders | NHL | 4 | 0 | 0 | 0 | 0 | — | — | — | — | — |
| NHL totals | | | 845 | 43 | 220 | 263 | 588 | 100 | 3 | 16 | 19 | 73 |

=== International ===
| Year | Team | Event | GP | G | A | Pts | PIM |
|---|---|---|---|---|---|---|---|
| 1979 | Canada | WC | 8 | 1 | 1 | 2 | 2 |
| 1981 | Canada | WC | 7 | 1 | 3 | 4 | 2 |
| 1982 | Canada | WC | 9 | 0 | 3 | 3 | 2 |
| 1990 | Canada | WC | 10 | 0 | 0 | 0 | 2 |
| Senior totals | | | 32 | 2 | 7 | 9 | 8 |

| Preceded by Mel Bridgman | NHL first overall draft pick 1976 | Succeeded by Dale McCourt |
| Preceded by Alex Forsyth | Washington Capitals first-round draft pick 1976 | Succeeded by Greg Carroll |
| Preceded by Pierre Mondou | Quebec Nordiques first-round draft pick 1976 | Succeeded by Lucien DeBlois |
