= Don Murdoch =

Canadian ice hockey player (born 1956)

- Born: October 25, 1956 (age 69) Cranbrook, British Columbia, Canada
- Height: 5 ft 11 in (180 cm)
- Weight: 180 lb (82 kg; 12 st 12 lb)
- Position: Right wing
- Shot: Right
- Played for: New York Rangers; Edmonton Oilers; Detroit Red Wings
- NHL draft: 6th overall, 1976; New York Rangers
- WHA draft: 12th overall, 1976; Cincinnati Stingers
- Playing career: 1976–1986

Donald Walter Murdoch (born October 25, 1956) is a Canadian former professional ice hockey player. He played in the National Hockey League with the New York Rangers, Edmonton Oilers, and Detroit Red Wings between 1976 and 1982. He was featured in the 1979 Stanley Cup Final, playing with the Rangers.

== Playing career ==
After a standout junior career with the Medicine Hat Tigers, Murdoch was selected 6th overall in the 1976 NHL Amateur Draft by the New York Rangers and joined the team that year as a 20-year-old. He scored 56 points in 59 games his rookie season, including a Rangers rookie record of 32 goals, and finished as runner-up for the Calder Trophy for best rookie. On October 12, 1976, Murdoch tied Howie Meeker's record for most goals in one game by a rookie with 5, against the Minnesota North Stars. A torn Achilles tendon ended his season in February.

On August 12, 1977, Murdoch was caught by customs agents at Toronto's Pearson Airport with 4.5 grams of cocaine stashed in his socks. He was suspended by the league for the entire 1978–79 season (later reduced to 40 games) and later admitted to having a drinking and drug problem.

He played 320 career games in the National Hockey League (NHL) but never regained the form of his first season, and retired after stops with the Edmonton Oilers and Detroit Red Wings.

After his playing career, Murdoch worked as a scout for the Tampa Bay Lightning, under general manager and former Rangers teammate Phil Esposito.

Don is the brother of Bob Murdoch.

== Legacy ==
In the 2009 book 100 Ranger Greats, the authors ranked Murdoch at No. 99 all-time of the 901 New York Rangers who had played during the team's first 82 seasons.

== Career statistics ==
=== Regular season and playoffs ===
			Regular season					Playoffs
Season	Team	League	GP	G	A	Pts	PIM	GP	G	A	Pts	PIM
1973–74	Vernon Vikings	BCHL	45	50	32	82	69	—	—	—	—	—
1973–74	Medicine Hat Tigers	WCHL	4	1	0	1	9	—	—	—	—	—
1974–75	Medicine Hat Tigers	WCHL	70	82	59	141	83	5	1	5	6	15
1975–76	Medicine Hat Tigers	WCHL	70	88	77	165	202	7	4	3	7	23
1976–77	New York Rangers	NHL	59	32	24	56	47	—	—	—	—	—
1977–78	New York Rangers	NHL	66	27	28	55	41	3	1	3	4	4
1978–79	New York Rangers	NHL	40	15	21	36	6	18	7	5	12	12
1979–80	New York Rangers	NHL	56	23	19	42	16	—	—	—	—	—
1979–80	Edmonton Oilers	NHL	10	5	2	7	4	3	2	0	2	0
1980–81	Wichita Wind	CHL	22	15	10	25	48	18	17	7	24	24
1980–81	Edmonton Oilers	NHL	40	10	9	19	18	—	—	—	—	—
1981–82	Adirondack Red Wings	AHL	24	11	13	24	24	4	5	0	5	14
1981–82	Detroit Red Wings	NHL	49	9	13	22	23	—	—	—	—	—
1982–83	Adirondack Red Wings	AHL	35	10	12	22	19	—	—	—	—	—
1983–84	Montana Magic	CHL	17	10	10	20	2	—	—	—	—	—
1983–84	Adirondack Red Wings	AHL	59	26	20	46	19	—	—	—	—	—
1984–85	Muskegon Lumberjacks	IHL	32	18	13	31	4	16	6	3	9	26
1985–86	Muskegon Lumberjacks	IHL	12	4	4	8	0	—	—	—	—	—
1985–86	Indianapolis Checkers	IHL	11	4	3	7	4	—	—	—	—	—
1985–86	Toledo Goaldiggers	IHL	37	15	23	38	8	—	—	—	—	—
NHL totals			320	121	116	237	155	24	10	8	18	16

== Awards ==
- WCHL All-Star Team – 1975
- WCHL First All-Star Team – 1976
- NHL All-Star Game selection: 1977

== See also ==
- List of players with 5 or more goals in an NHL game

Preceded by Wayne Dillon	New York Rangers first-round draft pick 1976	Succeeded by Lucien DeBlois
