= Brian Engblom =

Canadian ice hockey broadcaster

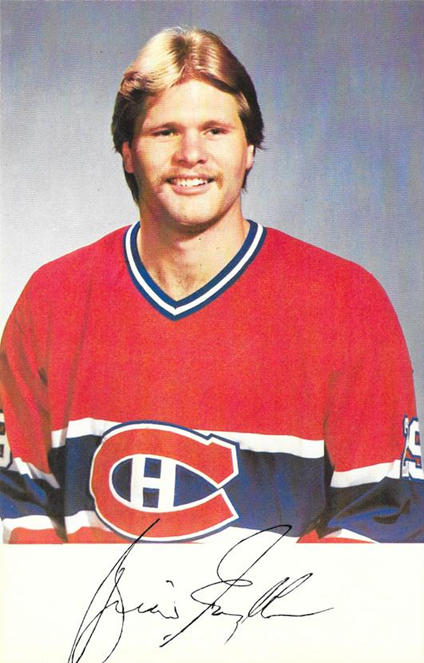
- Engblom with the Montreal Canadiens in 1981
- Born: January 27, 1955 (age 71) Winnipeg, Manitoba, Canada
- Height: 6 ft 2 in (188 cm)
- Weight: 200 lb (91 kg; 14 st 4 lb)
- Position: Defense
- Shot: Left
- Played for: Montreal Canadiens; Washington Capitals; Los Angeles Kings; Buffalo Sabres; Calgary Flames
- National team: Canada
- NHL draft: 22nd overall, 1975; Montreal Canadiens
- WHA draft: 22nd overall, 1974; Winnipeg Jets
- Playing career: 1975–1987
Medal record
Representing Canada
Ice hockey
World Championships
Bronze medal – third place	1983 West Germany

Brian Paul Engblom (born January 27, 1955) is a Canadian ice hockey broadcaster for the Tampa Bay Lightning, and a former professional hockey defenceman. He was a two-time Stanley Cup champion with the Montreal Canadiens.

== Biography ==
Engblom was born in Winnipeg, Manitoba, and played for the University of Wisconsin–Madison. He was drafted 22nd overall by the Montreal Canadiens in the 1975 NHL entry draft. He played his first two professional seasons with Montreal's AHL affiliate Nova Scotia Voyageurs before playing in his first NHL game in the 1977 Stanley Cup playoffs with Montreal. While the Canadiens won the Stanley Cup in 1977, his name was left off the Cup due to playing no regular season games. However, Engblom would become a regular with the Canadiens and wound up winning the Cup with the team in 1978 and 1979.

In September 1982, while he was establishing himself as a top NHL defenseman, Engblom was traded to the Washington Capitals as part of a six-player blockbuster trade that sent him, Doug Jarvis, Rod Langway and Craig Laughlin to Washington in exchange for Rick Green and Ryan Walter. A season later, he was dealt with Ken Houston to the Los Angeles Kings in exchange for future hall of famer Larry Murphy. He finished his career with stints for the Buffalo Sabres and Calgary Flames. Engblom's final NHL season of 1986–87 ended prematurely due to bone spurs in his spinal column that required major surgery to repair. In 11 seasons, Engblom scored 29 goals and 177 assists.

=== Broadcasting career ===
Engblom was an NHL color commentator for ESPN and NHL on ABC from 1993 to 2004. After NBC Sports acquired NHL TV rights in 2004, he served as their color commentator/studio analyst for both NBC/NBCSN and the network's coverage of the 2014 Winter Olympics in Sochi, Russia. Engblom was an analyst on NHL Live for Versus and also served as a color analyst for Winnipeg Jets games on TSN in Canada. During the 2005–06 season, he was color analyst for Columbus Blue Jackets games aired on Fox Sports Ohio. Engblom has also provided post-game analysis for the Colorado Avalanche on Altitude Sports and Entertainment, in rotation with Mark Rycroft.

Engblom joined Sun Sports for the 2015–16 season as a color analyst for the Tampa Bay Lightning replacing Bobby Taylor, who moved to studio host.

== Awards and honours ==
Award	Year
All-WCHA First Team	1974–75
AHCA West All-American	1974–75
MJHL Most Valuable Player	1973
AHL first All-Star team	1977
Eddie Shore Award (AHL Most Outstanding Defenseman)	1977
Stanley Cup championships	1978, 1979
NHL second team All-Star	1982

- NHL plus-minus leader (+63) (1981)
- "Honoured Member" of the Manitoba Hockey Hall of Fame

== Career statistics ==
=== Regular season and playoffs ===
			Regular season					Playoffs
Season	Team	League	GP	G	A	Pts	PIM	GP	G	A	Pts	PIM
1972–73	Winnipeg Monarchs	MJHL	48	17	46	63	—	—	—	—	—	—
1973–74	Wisconsin Badgers	WCHA	36	10	21	31	54	—	—	—	—	—
1974–75	Wisconsin Badgers	WCHA	38	13	23	36	58	—	—	—	—	—
1975–76	Nova Scotia Voyageurs	AHL	73	4	34	38	79	9	1	7	8	26
1976–77	Nova Scotia Voyageurs	AHL	80	8	42	50	89	11	3	10	13	10
1976–77	Montreal Canadiens	NHL	—	—	—	—	—	2	0	0	0	2
1977–78	Montreal Canadiens	NHL	28	1	2	3	23	5	0	0	0	2
1978–79	Montreal Canadiens	NHL	62	3	11	14	60	16	0	1	1	11
1979–80	Montreal Canadiens	NHL	70	3	20	23	43	10	2	4	6	6
1980–81	Montreal Canadiens	NHL	80	3	25	28	96	3	1	0	1	4
1981–82	Montreal Canadiens	NHL	76	4	29	33	76	5	0	2	2	14
1982–83	Washington Capitals	NHL	73	5	22	27	59	4	0	2	2	2
1983–84	Washington Capitals	NHL	6	0	1	1	8	—	—	—	—	—
1983–84	Los Angeles Kings	NHL	74	2	27	29	59	—	—	—	—	—
1984–85	Los Angeles Kings	NHL	79	4	19	23	70	3	0	0	0	2
1985–86	Los Angeles Kings	NHL	49	3	13	16	61	—	—	—	—	—
1985–86	Buffalo Sabres	NHL	30	1	4	5	16	—	—	—	—	—
1986–87	Calgary Flames	NHL	32	0	4	4	28	—	—	—	—	—
NHL totals			659	29	177	206	599	48	3	9	12	43

=== International ===
Year	Team	Event	GP	G	A	Pts	PIM
1981	Canada	CC	5	1	0	1	4
1983	Canada	WC	10	1	2	3	0
Senior totals			15	2	2	4	4
