= Pierre Mondou =

Canadian ice hockey player (born 1955)

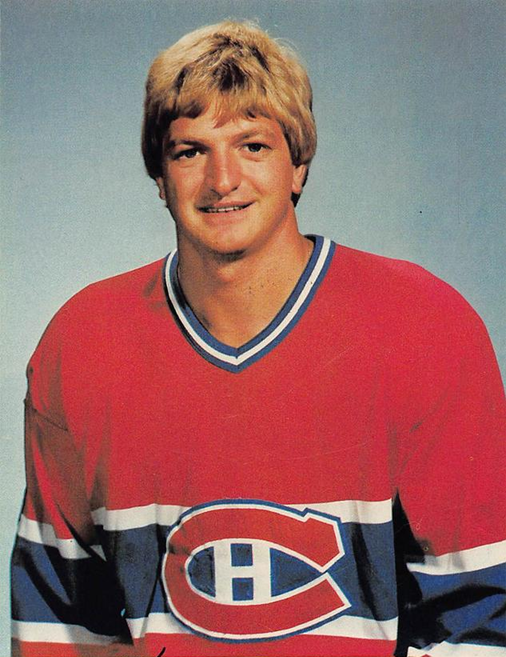
- Mondou in 1981
- Born: November 27, 1955 (age 70) Sorel-Tracy, Quebec, Canada
- Height: 5 ft 10 in (178 cm)
- Weight: 185 lb (84 kg; 13 st 3 lb)
- Position: Centre
- Shot: Right
- Played for: Montreal Canadiens
- NHL draft: 15th overall, 1975; Montreal Canadiens
- WHA draft: 14th overall, 1975; Quebec Nordiques
- Playing career: 1975–1985

Pierre Mondou (born November 27, 1955) is a Canadian former ice hockey forward.

Mondou played in the National Hockey League (NHL) from 1977 to 1985. During this time, he played for the Montreal Canadiens his entire career. He won three Stanley Cups while with Montreal in 1977, 1978 and 1979. He passed the 30-goal mark three times and scored 29 goals in one other season. His career ended shortly after he was hit in the eye by a high stick from Ulf Samuelsson. He later served as a scout for the Canadiens, earning a Stanley Cup ring with the team in 1993, but his name was not included on the Cup.

== Career statistics ==
			Regular season					Playoffs
Season	Team	League	GP	G	A	Pts	PIM	GP	G	A	Pts	PIM
1972–73	Sorel Black Hawks	QMJHL	64	37	43	80	57	—	—	—	—	—
1973–74	Sorel Black Hawks	QMJHL	60	62	57	119	102	—	—	—	—	—
1974–75	Sorel Black Hawks	QMJHL	28	16	23	39	13	—	—	—	—	—
1974–75	Montreal Red White and Blue	QMJHL	40	40	47	87	23	—	—	—	—	—
1975–76	Nova Scotia Voyageurs	AHL	74	34	43	77	30	9	1	5	6	4
1976–77	Nova Scotia Voyageurs	AHL	71	44	45	89	21	12	8	11	19	6
1976–77	Montreal Canadiens	NHL	—	—	—	—	—	3	0	0	0	0
1977–78	Montreal Canadiens	NHL	71	19	30	49	8	15	3	7	10	4
1978–79	Montreal Canadiens	NHL	77	31	41	72	26	16	3	6	9	4
1979–80	Montreal Canadiens	NHL	75	30	36	66	12	4	1	4	5	4
1980–81	Montreal Canadiens	NHL	57	17	24	41	16	3	0	1	1	0
1981–82	Montreal Canadiens	NHL	73	35	33	68	57	5	2	5	7	8
1982–83	Montreal Canadiens	NHL	76	29	37	66	31	3	0	1	1	2
1983–84	Montreal Canadiens	NHL	52	15	22	37	8	14	6	3	9	2
1984–85	Montreal Canadiens	NHL	67	18	39	57	21	5	2	1	3	2
NHL totals			548	194	262	456	179	68	17	28	45	26

Preceded by Robin Sadler	Montreal Canadiens first-round draft pick 1975	Succeeded by Peter Lee
Preceded by Real Cloutier	Quebec Nordiques first-round draft pick 1975	Succeeded by Rick Green
