= Doug Jarvis =

Canadian ice hockey player (born 1955)

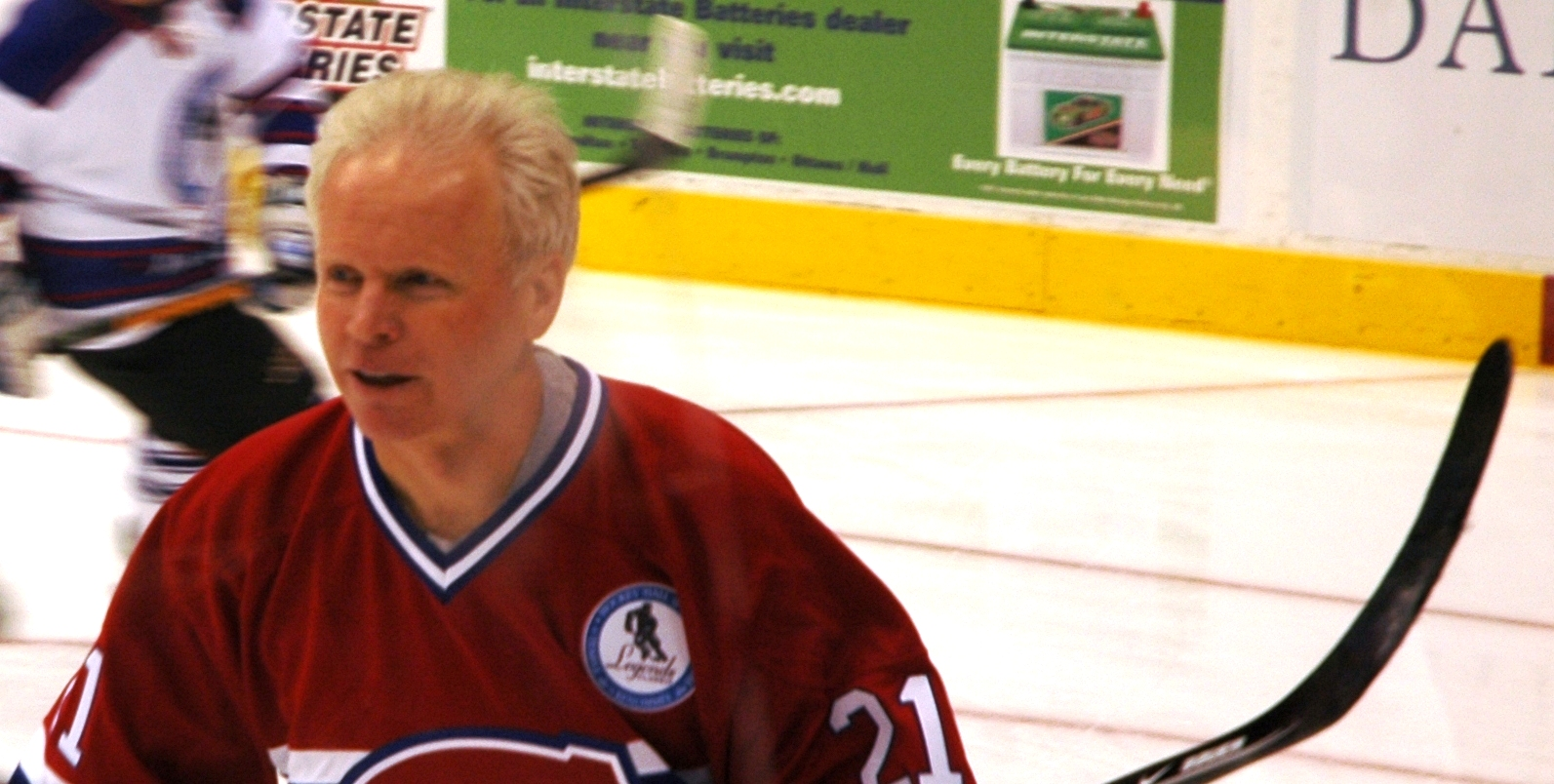
- Jarvis in 2008
- Born: March 24, 1955 (age 71) Brantford, Ontario, Canada
- Height: 5 ft 9 in (175 cm)
- Weight: 170 lb (77 kg; 12 st 2 lb)
- Position: Centre
- Shot: Left
- Played for: Montreal Canadiens; Washington Capitals; Hartford Whalers
- National team: Canada
- NHL draft: 24th overall, 1975; Toronto Maple Leafs
- WHA draft: 30th overall, 1975; Houston Aeros
- Playing career: 1975–1988

Douglas McArthur Jarvis (born March 24, 1955) is a Canadian former professional ice hockey forward who played for the Montreal Canadiens, Washington Capitals and Hartford Whalers in the National Hockey League (NHL). He was a four-time Stanley Cup winner with the Canadiens.

Jarvis never missed a regular season game in his NHL career, which began on October 8, 1975, and ran until 1987; from 1986 until 2022, he held the NHL's longest-ever iron man streak. He previously served as an assistant coach for the Boston Bruins of the National Hockey League. He is currently a senior advisor for the Vancouver Canucks.

== Playing career ==
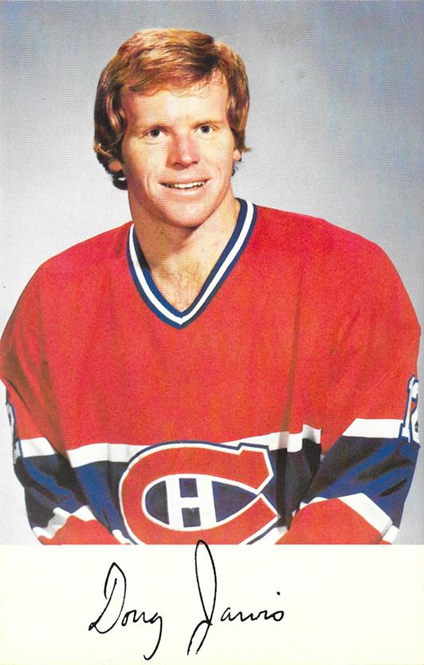
1981 photo of Doug Jarvis for Montreal Canadiens

Jarvis began his hockey career with the Peterborough Petes in the OHA. He was a key player with the Petes as he took important faceoffs and strengthened their special teams unit. The Petes were selected to play as Team Canada in the 1974 World Junior Ice Hockey Championships, in what was first edition of the tournament was staged, and Jarvis was part of that team. Canada took home the bronze medal as Jarvis scored four goals in five games. After a 133-point effort in 1974–75, he was selected to the OMJHL First All-Star Team. This caught the attention of NHL scouts and in 1975, he was picked 24th overall by the Toronto Maple Leafs in the 1975 NHL Amateur Draft. However, he was traded almost right away to the Montreal Canadiens in exchange for Greg Hubick.

Jarvis began his professional hockey career with the Montreal Canadiens, winning a spot on the team as a 20-year-old rookie in 1975–76, playing every game that season. He remained there for seven years teaming up with Bob Gainey to form one of the league's top penalty killing teams, with Gainey being awarded the first four Frank J. Selke Trophies as best defensive forward. Jarvis was a member of four consecutive Stanley Cups between 1976 and 1979. In 1980–81, Jarvis broke the 20-goal mark for the first time in his career.

In September 1982, Jarvis was traded to the Washington Capitals as part of a six-player blockbuster trade that sent him, Brian Engblom, Rod Langway and Craig Laughlin to Washington in exchange for Rick Green and Ryan Walter. He and his teammates from Montreal helped solidify the Caps defence and turned the Capitals into a Stanley Cup contender team. In 1983–84, Jarvis was awarded the Frank J. Selke Trophy for his outstanding two-way play.

Halfway through the 1985–86 season, he was traded to the Hartford Whalers for Jorgen Pettersson. It was in Hartford that Doug Jarvis set the NHL record for most consecutive games played with 964, breaking Garry Unger's record of 914. For this achievement, he was awarded the Bill Masterton Memorial Trophy in 1986–87. Jarvis was eventually passed by Keith Yandle in the 2021–22 season. In 1987–88, Jarvis was sent down to the minors as the Whalers were looking for Brent Peterson to take over as the team's top checking centre. He played in 24 games with the Binghamton Whalers before retiring.

== Coaching career and front office career ==
Shortly after retiring, Jarvis was hired by the Minnesota North Stars to serve as assistant coach to Pierre Page. Two years later, the North Stars hired former linemate Bob Gainey as coach and general manager. The two helped the North Stars reach the Stanley Cup Final in 1991 where they lost to the Pittsburgh Penguins. In 1993, the team was relocated to Dallas as the Dallas Stars. He stayed with the North Stars/Stars for 14 years where Dallas won their first Stanley Cup in franchise history in 1999. His 14-year tenure with the North Stars/Stars makes it the longest period of time that an assistant coach has stayed with the same franchise.

Jarvis was an assistant coach with the Montreal Canadiens from 2005 until his dismissal in 2009 and coached the Canadiens farm team, the Hamilton Bulldogs, from 2003–2005.

Jarvis also served as assistant coach to the Boston Bruins, which won the Stanley Cup in 2011.

Jarvis was hired by the Vancouver Canucks as an assistant coach during the 2016 offseason. He left his role after the 2017–18 season. He currently serves as a senior advisor for the Canucks.

== Personal life ==
Jarvis and his wife Linda have two children, Landry and Laura. His cousin is Wes Jarvis.

== Awards and achievements ==
Medal record

Representing Canada

Ice hockey

World Junior Championships
Bronze medal – third place	1974 Soviet Union	Ice Hockey

- Selected to the OMJHL First All-Star Team in 1975.
- Frank J. Selke Trophy winner in 1984.
- Bill Masterton Memorial Trophy winner in 1987.
- Stanley Cup champion in 1976, 1977, 1978, 1979 (as player).
- Stanley Cup champion in 1999 and 2011 (as assistant coach).
- Formerly held NHL record for most consecutive games played (964).
  - Didn’t miss an NHL regular season game until he was a healthy scratch for game 3 of the 1987-88 season.

== Career statistics ==
=== Regular season and playoffs ===
			Regular season					Playoffs
Season	Team	League	GP	G	A	Pts	PIM	GP	G	A	Pts	PIM
1971–72	Brantford Majors	SOJHL	11	2	10	12	0	—	—	—	—	—
1972–73	Peterborough Petes	OHA-Jr.	63	20	49	69	14	—	—	—	—	—
1973–74	Peterborough Petes	OHA-Jr.	70	31	53	84	27	—	—	—	—	—
1974–75	Peterborough Petes	OMJHL	64	45	88	133	38	11	4	11	15	8
1975–76	Montreal Canadiens	NHL	80	5	30	35	16	13	2	1	3	2
1976–77	Montreal Canadiens	NHL	80	16	22	38	14	14	0	7	7	2
1977–78	Montreal Canadiens	NHL	80	11	28	39	23	15	3	5	8	12
1978–79	Montreal Canadiens	NHL	80	10	13	23	16	12	1	3	4	4
1979–80	Montreal Canadiens	NHL	80	13	11	24	28	10	4	4	8	2
1980–81	Montreal Canadiens	NHL	80	16	22	38	34	3	0	0	0	0
1981–82	Montreal Canadiens	NHL	80	20	28	48	20	5	1	0	1	4
1982–83	Washington Capitals	NHL	80	8	22	30	10	4	0	1	1	0
1983–84	Washington Capitals	NHL	80	13	29	42	12	8	2	3	5	6
1984–85	Washington Capitals	NHL	80	9	28	37	32	5	1	0	1	2
1985–86	Washington Capitals	NHL	25	1	2	3	16	—	—	—	—	—
1985–86	Hartford Whalers	NHL	57	8	16	24	20	10	0	3	3	4
1986–87	Hartford Whalers	NHL	80	9	13	22	20	6	0	0	0	4
1987–88	Hartford Whalers	NHL	2	0	0	0	2	—	—	—	—	—
1987–88	Binghamton Whalers	AHL	24	5	4	9	4	—	—	—	—	—
NHL totals			964	139	264	403	263	105	14	27	41	42

=== International ===
Year	Team	Event	GP	G	A	Pts	PIM
1974	Canada	WJC	5	4	1	5	2

== See also ==
- Iron man

Preceded by Bobby Clarke	Winner of the Frank J. Selke Trophy; 1984	Succeeded by Craig Ramsay
Preceded by Charlie Simmer	Bill Masterton Trophy winner 1987	Succeeded by Bob Bourne
