= Mario Tremblay =

Canadian ice hockey player and coach

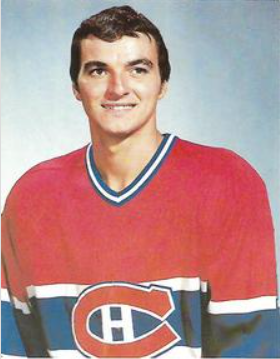
- Tremblay in 1980 card
- Born: September 2, 1956 (age 70) Alma, Quebec, Canada
- Height: 6 ft 0 in (183 cm)
- Weight: 185 lb (84 kg; 13 st 3 lb)
- Position: Right wing
- Shot: Right
- Played for: Montreal Canadiens
- NHL draft: 12th overall, 1974; Montreal Canadiens
- Playing career: 1974–1986

Joseph Daniel Mario Tremblay (born September 2, 1956) is a Canadian former professional ice hockey player and coach in the National Hockey League (NHL). As a player, he was a five-time Stanley Cup winner with the Montreal Canadiens.

He was honoured by his hometown of Alma, which named its local arena "Le Centre Mario-Tremblay". Since 1981, Tremblay has owned the sports bar in his hometown called "Bar-Restaurant chez Mario Tremblay".

== Playing career ==
Tremblay, nicknamed "Le bleuet bionique" (The Bionic Blueberry), played his junior hockey with the Montreal Bleu Blanc Rouge and played with the Montreal Canadiens for his entire NHL playing career (1974–1986), winning five Stanley Cup championships with the team as a player in 1976, 1977, 1978, 1979, and 1986. In 852 regular season games in the NHL, he scored 258 goals and added 326 assists for 584 points, with 1043 penalty minutes. He scored the winning goal in game six of the 1978 Stanley Cup Final, giving the cup to the Canadiens. He was the winner of the Molson Cup for the 1982–83 season. Tremblay is 10th on the Montreal Canadiens all-time list for plus-minus at 184. Tremblay remains the youngest goal scorer in franchise history, having achieved his inaugural tally at age 18 years, 75 days on November 16, 1974, against the New York Rangers at the Forum.

In his first few seasons with the Canadiens, he was part of a very dynamic forward line alongside center Doug Risebrough (who was also a rookie in 1974-75) and LW Yvon Lambert. Their job was to contain their opponents' main scoring line and to create room for the team's highly skilled players by agitating and pestering their opponents' best players. When the three began playing together a few weeks into the 1974-75 season, they lit a fire under a team that had started the year slowly, winning just 3 of its first 10 games. All three were regular visitors to the penalty box during those years. The line was together for all four Stanley Cup wins from 1976 to 1979. In later years, Tremblay was given more goal-scoring responsibilities and was a regular on the power play. He scored 30 or more goals in four different seasons, the first time in 1978-79, his fifth season in the league.

He announced his retirement in September 1986, after suffering a serious shoulder injury the previous season that caused him to miss the 1986 Stanley Cup playoffs.

== Coaching career ==
=== Montreal Canadiens ===
Tremblay was hired six games into the 1995–96 season as head coach of the Canadiens although he had no previous coaching experience. Tremblay had a long-running dispute with star goaltender Patrick Roy, which started from their days as teammates, with Tremblay regularly mocking Roy for speaking broken English. Roy was also a frequent target of Tremblay during the latter's sports radio career. The two had almost come to blows in a Long Island coffee shop before Tremblay was announced as coach, and Roy snickered when Tremblay arrived in the dressing room for the first time. They almost fought a second time after Tremblay fired a shot at Roy's throat during practice.

Not long after Tremblay became coach, their distaste for each other led to Roy's departure from Montreal. Tremblay kept Roy in net during a December 2, 1995, game versus the Detroit Red Wings, in which the Wings scored nine goals on Roy, who was jeered by the Montreal fans. Roy stormed off the ice and told team president Ronald Corey that he would never play for the Canadiens again. Four days later, Roy was traded to Colorado with captain Mike Keane for Jocelyn Thibault, Martin Ručinský, and Andrei Kovalenko. Roy went on to lead the Avalanche to two Stanley Cups before retiring. The rivalry would continue into the coaching ranks, as Roy would later (on October 15, 2013) tie Tremblay's record for longest winning streak (six games) to begin an NHL coaching career.

Nearly a year after Roy left the Canadiens, Tremblay also had a heated verbal exchange with Habs enforcer Donald Brashear during a team practice before a game against the Avalanche in Denver. Brashear was later traded to the Vancouver Canucks.

As a head coach for Montreal, Tremblay coached 159 games, with 71 wins, 63 losses, and 25 ties across two years with the team.

=== Minnesota Wild and New Jersey Devils ===
In 2001, Tremblay became an assistant coach for the Minnesota Wild under head coach Jacques Lemaire. He remained there for seven seasons, through 2008–09. In 2009, he followed Lemaire to the New Jersey Devils where he remained an assistant coach under Lemaire. Lemaire retired in 2010 after one season in New Jersey and Tremblay was not retained as assistant coach. He then joined the Quebec sport network RDS as a hockey analyst for the Montreal Canadiens games.

== Personal life ==
Tremblay married Collette Germain in 1977 and the couple had two daughters. Germain died of cancer in 2015.

Tremblay is the uncle of professional hockey player Pascal Trépanier.

== Career statistics ==
			Regular season					Playoffs
Season	Team	League	GP	G	A	Pts	PIM	GP	G	A	Pts	PIM
1972–73	Montreal Bleu Blanc Rouge	QMJHL	56	43	37	80	155	4	0	1	1	4
1973–74	Montreal Bleu Blanc Rouge	QMJHL	46	49	51	100	154	7	1	3	4	17
1974–75	Nova Scotia Voyageurs	AHL	15	10	8	18	47	—	—	—	—	—
1974–75	Montreal Canadiens	NHL	63	21	18	39	108	11	0	1	1	7
1975–76	Montreal Canadiens	NHL	71	11	16	27	88	10	0	1	1	27
1976–77	Montreal Canadiens	NHL	74	18	28	46	61	14	0	3	3	9
1977–78	Montreal Canadiens	NHL	56	10	14	24	44	5	2	1	3	16
1978–79	Montreal Canadiens	NHL	76	30	29	59	74	13	3	4	7	13
1979–80	Montreal Canadiens	NHL	77	16	26	42	105	10	0	11	11	14
1980–81	Montreal Canadiens	NHL	77	25	38	63	123	3	0	0	0	9
1981–82	Montreal Canadiens	NHL	80	33	40	73	66	5	4	1	5	24
1982–83	Montreal Canadiens	NHL	80	30	37	67	87	3	0	1	1	7
1983–84	Montreal Canadiens	NHL	67	14	25	39	112	15	6	3	9	31
1984–85	Montreal Canadiens	NHL	75	31	35	66	120	12	2	6	8	30
1985–86	Montreal Canadiens	NHL	56	19	20	39	55	—	—	—	—	—
NHL totals			852	258	326	584	1,043	101	20	29	49	187

== Coaching record ==
Team	Year	Regular season						Postseason
Team	Year	GP	W	L	T	Pts	Finish	Result
MTL	1995–96	77	40	27	10	90	3rd in Northeast	Lost in first round
MTL	1996–97	82	31	36	15	77	4th in Northeast	Lost in first round
Total		159	71	63	25	167		

Preceded by Rick Chartraw	Montreal Canadiens first-round draft pick 1974	Succeeded by Gord McTavish
Preceded by Jacques Demers	Head coach of the Montreal Canadiens; 1995–97	Succeeded by Alain Vigneault
