= Rod Langway =

American ice hockey player (born 1957)

- Hockey Hall of Fame, 2002
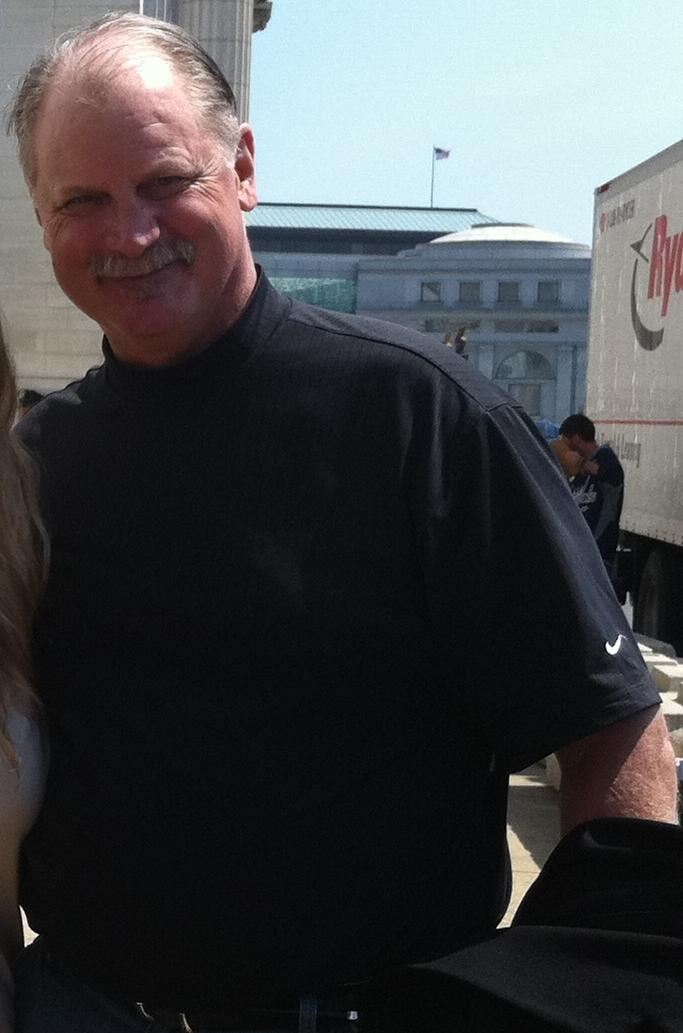
- Langway in 2011
- Born: May 3, 1957 (age 69) Taipei, Taiwan
- Height: 6 ft 3 in (191 cm)
- Weight: 218 lb (99 kg; 15 st 8 lb)
- Position: Defense
- Shot: Left
- Played for: Birmingham Bulls; Montreal Canadiens; Washington Capitals
- National team: United States
- NHL draft: 36th overall, 1977; Montreal Canadiens
- WHA draft: 6th overall, 1977; Birmingham Bulls
- Playing career: 1977–1993

Rodney Cory Langway (born May 3, 1957) is an American former professional ice hockey defenseman for 14 seasons in the National Hockey League (NHL) for the Montreal Canadiens and Washington Capitals. He also played one season in the World Hockey Association (WHA) for the Birmingham Bulls.

In his first season in the NHL, Langway won the Stanley Cup. He soon became known as a dominant shutdown defenseman, which started with the first of six straight NHL All-Star Game selections in 1980. A blockbuster trade in 1982 sent him to Washington, where he immediately became a franchise icon and earned the nickname "Secretary of Defense", which saw him play a key part in the team reaching the Stanley Cup playoffs in ten consecutive seasons after previously never reaching it in their history. He won the James Norris Memorial Trophy for his defensive play in 1982–83 and 1983–84 seasons. With his playing time declining at the start of the 1992–93 season, Langway left the team after 21 games and never played in the NHL again; he finished his career with 994 games played with 329 points.

After his playing career ended, Langway spent time with teams in the American Hockey League (AHL) and East Coast Hockey League (ECHL) as a player-coach. Langway was elected to the Hockey Hall of Fame in 2002.

== Early life and amateur career ==
Langway was born to a US military family in Taipei, Taiwan, and is the only NHL player to have been born there. He grew up in Randolph, Massachusetts, and did not begin playing hockey until age 13 in 1970, aside from pick-up street hockey games with the neighborhood boys. He then led Randolph High School to three straight state tournament appearances in 1973, 1974 and 1975. He was also a standout quarterback for the Blue Devils and was one of the top football recruits in the nation. As a catcher on the Randolph High baseball team, Langway was considered a baseball pro-prospect. He was an honor student. However, the top college football programs in the country had identified Langway as a future NFL quarterback. It was football recruiter and assistant hockey coach, Bob Norton, from the University of New Hampshire who convinced him to play college hockey at UNH, one of the few schools that would allow him to play both football and hockey in college, which he did without having to choose one over the other as an incoming freshman. Langway went on to lead UNH to the NCAA hockey final four in 1977. Ultimately, hockey ended up being the direction for him as a professional career. He was inducted into the Randolph High and UNH Athletic Halls of Fame.

== Professional career ==
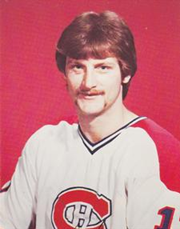
Langway with the Montreal Canadiens in 1978

A left-handed shot, Langway was drafted by the Montreal Canadiens of the NHL in 1977 and by the Birmingham Bulls of the WHA in the same year. He played one season for the Bulls (1977–78) before joining the Canadiens for the 1978–79 NHL season. He was 22 years old when he helped the Canadiens win the Stanley Cup that year. He played for Montreal until he was traded to the Washington Capitals for the start of the 1982–83 season.

The Capitals acquired Langway from the Canadiens in a blockbuster trade—going with Doug Jarvis, Craig Laughlin, and Brian Engblom in exchange for Ryan Walter and Rick Green. That trade not only saved the franchise from moving out of D.C., but also stocked them for an extended string of postseason appearances. After not making the playoffs in their first eight seasons in the league, the Capitals competed in the postseason in every one of the 11 years that Langway was with the team. Following that trade, the Capitals named Langway their captain (succeeding the aforementioned Ryan Walter), which he would hold for the next 11 seasons until his NHL retirement.

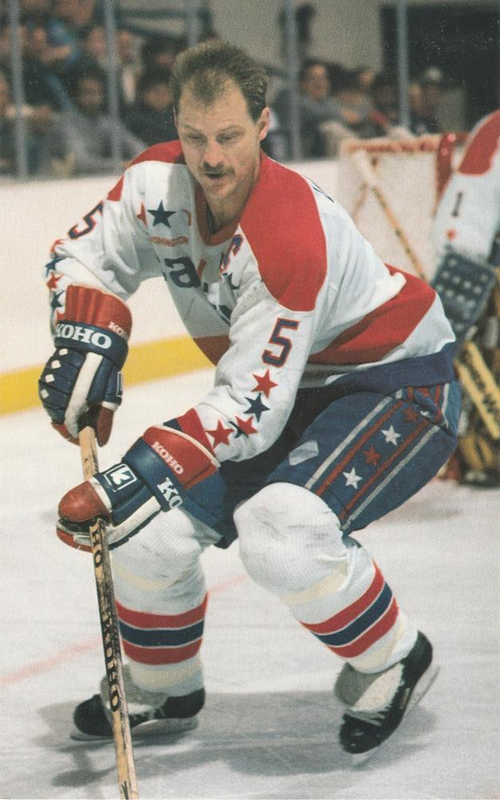
Langway with the Washington Capitals in 1987

As captain, Langway became known as an accomplished leader who demanded greatness from himself and others, earning the nickname "Secretary of Defense". Many people considered him the franchise's savior, despite not being the sort of player that one would expect to prevent the club from moving. Langway's predecessors as Norris Trophy winners were the dominant defensemen of the 1970s, like Bobby Orr, Larry Robinson, and Denis Potvin, who had put up high scoring numbers. By contrast, Langway was a traditional defender whose shot was likened to a "cool summer breeze", scoring only three goals during one of his best seasons, though he is remembered by Capitals fans for a game–winning goal in overtime against the New York Rangers' Mike Richter in the 1990 playoffs. Despite his lack of offensive production, his excellence at his position was credited with significantly reducing the Capitals' goals-against average, which enabled them to finally make the playoffs.

Langway won the Norris Trophy as the NHL's top defenseman in both 1983 and 1984. He earned two postseason All-Star first team selections and one Second Team selection as a defenseman—the first American NHL All-Star since Frank Brimsek in 1948. Langway finished runner-up to Wayne Gretzky for the Hart Memorial Trophy in 1984. He was also part of the NHL All-Star team that played the Soviet national hockey team in Rendez-Vous '87. He left the team in February 1993 of the 1992–93 season after seeing his ice time declined. He was the last active player who won a Stanley Cup with the Montreal Canadiens during their late-70s dynasty. In international hockey, he represented the United States in the 1981, 1984, and 1987 Canada Cup as well as the 1982 Ice Hockey World Championship tournaments.

== Coaching career ==
Langway served as player-coach for the San Francisco Spiders during their single season as an IHL team in 1995–1996. Langway began his career before helmets were mandatory and was the only member of the Spiders who played without a helmet under a league grandfather clause. He played without a helmet even while he was playing for the Washington Capitals and was normally the only player on the ice who was not wearing a helmet.

Langway was also an assistant coach under Tom McVie with the American Hockey League's Providence Bruins during the 1997–98 season. He played in ten games that year to assist with on-ice development, during which time he was not granted an exemption to play without a helmet. Providence finished with a mere 19 victories that season, and Langway did not return the following year after McVie was reassigned to be a scout by the Boston organization.

During the 2003–04 season, Langway coached the Richmond Riverdogs expansion franchise in the United Hockey League to a division championship, and a first-round playoff loss to the Elmira Jackals. Team management did not extend Langway's contract after the first season.

== Awards and accomplishments ==
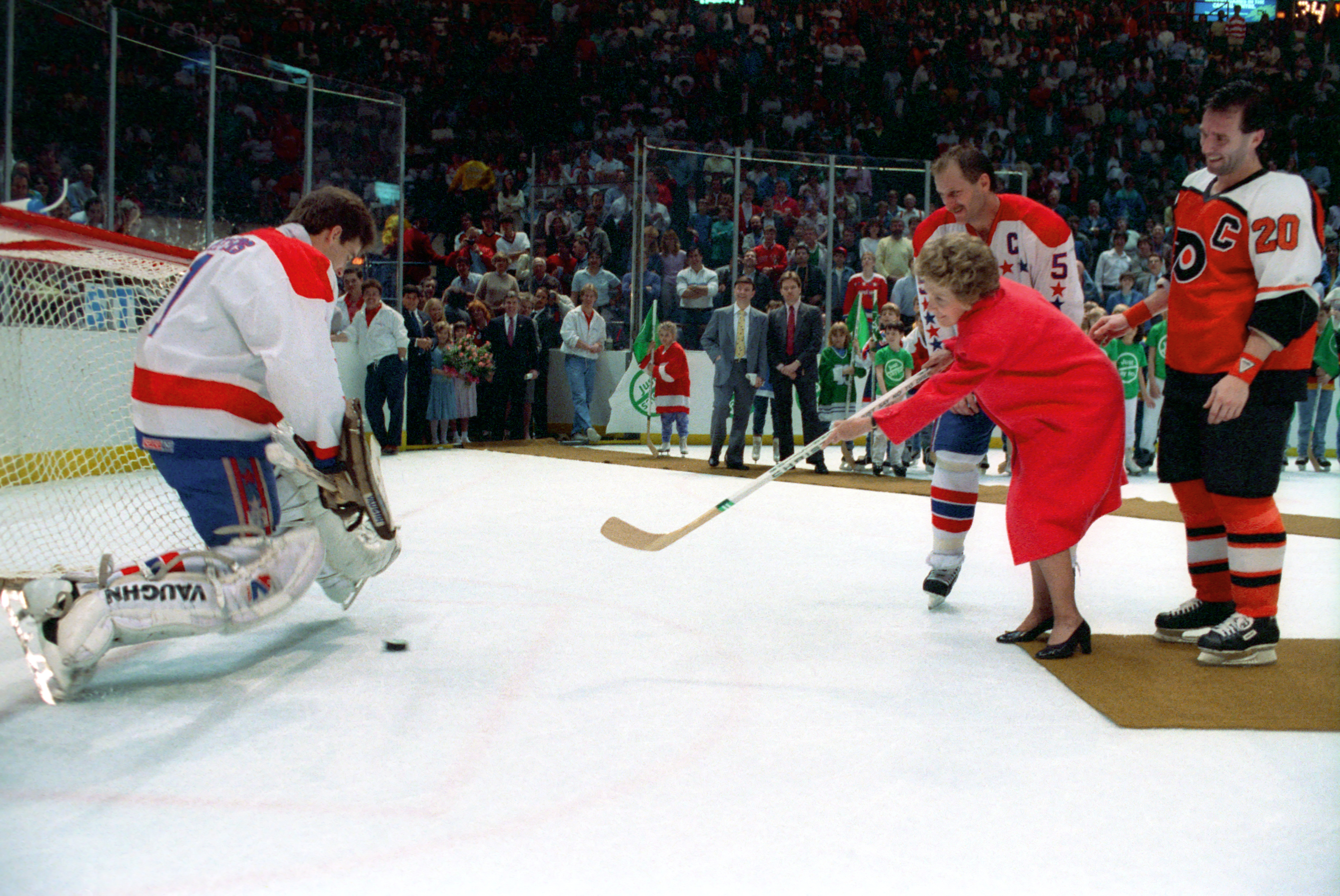
Langway with Nancy Reagan, Pete Peeters and Dave Poulin in 1988

- Stanley Cup champion – 1979
- Norris Trophy: 1982–83, 1983–84
- NHL All-Star first team: 1982–83, 1983–84
- NHL All-Star second team: 1984–85
- All-Star Game: 1981, 1982, 1983, 1984, 1985, 1986
- Canada Cup 1984 All-Star first team

Langway's jersey number (#5) was retired by the Washington Capitals on November 26, 1997, and he was inducted into the United States Hockey Hall of Fame in 1999. His career was crowned with his election to the Hockey Hall of Fame in 2002. In 2012, he was inducted into the World Hockey Association Hall of Fame in the “Legends of the Game” category.

== Career statistics ==
=== Regular season and playoffs ===
			Regular season					Playoffs
Season	Team	League	GP	G	A	Pts	PIM	GP	G	A	Pts	PIM
1972–73	Randolph High School	HS-MA	16	20	19	39	—	—	—	—	—
1973–74	Randolph High School	HS-MA	—	—	—	—	—	—	—	—	—	—
1974–75	Randolph High School	HS-MA	—	—	—	—	—	—	—	—	—	—
1975–76	University of New Hampshire	ECAC	31	3	13	16	10	—	—	—	—	—
1976–77	University of New Hampshire	ECAC	34	10	43	53	52	—	—	—	—	—
1977–78	Hampton Gulls	AHL	30	6	16	22	50	—	—	—	—	—
1977–78	Birmingham Bulls	WHA	52	3	18	21	52	4	0	0	0	9
1978–79	Nova Scotia Voyageurs	AHL	18	6	13	19	29	—	—	—	—	—
1978–79	Montreal Canadiens	NHL	45	4	3	7	30	8	0	0	0	16
1979–80	Montreal Canadiens	NHL	77	7	29	36	81	10	3	3	6	2
1980–81	Montreal Canadiens	NHL	80	11	34	45	120	3	0	0	0	6
1981–82	Montreal Canadiens	NHL	66	5	34	39	116	5	0	3	3	18
1982–83	Washington Capitals	NHL	80	3	29	32	75	4	0	0	0	0
1983–84	Washington Capitals	NHL	80	9	24	33	61	8	0	5	5	7
1984–85	Washington Capitals	NHL	79	4	22	26	54	5	0	1	1	6
1985–86	Washington Capitals	NHL	71	1	17	18	61	9	1	2	3	6
1986–87	Washington Capitals	NHL	78	2	25	27	53	7	0	1	1	2
1987–88	Washington Capitals	NHL	63	3	13	16	28	6	0	0	0	8
1988–89	Washington Capitals	NHL	76	2	19	21	67	6	0	0	0	6
1989–90	Washington Capitals	NHL	58	0	8	8	39	15	1	4	5	12
1990–91	Washington Capitals	NHL	56	1	7	8	24	11	0	2	2	6
1991–92	Washington Capitals	NHL	64	0	13	13	22	7	0	1	1	2
1992–93	Washington Capitals	NHL	21	0	0	0	20	—	—	—	—	—
1994–95	Richmond Renegades	ECHL	6	0	0	0	2	9	1	1	2	4
1995–96	San Francisco Spiders	IHL	46	1	5	6	38	—	—	—	—	—
1997–98	Providence Bruins	AHL	10	0	1	1	6	—	—	—	—	—
WHA totals			52	3	18	21	52	4	0	0	0	9
NHL totals			994	51	278	329	851	104	5	22	27	97

=== International ===
Year	Team	Event	GP	G	A	Pts	PIM
1981	United States	CC	6	0	1	1	8
1982	United States	WC	6	0	2	2	4
1984	United States	CC	6	1	1	2	8
1987	United States	CC	5	0	1	1	6
Senior totals			23	1	5	6	26

== See also ==
- List of members of the United States Hockey Hall of Fame

Preceded by Ryan Walter	Washington Capitals captain 1982–92	Succeeded by Kevin Hatcher
Preceded by Doug Wilson	Winner of the Norris Trophy; 1983, 1984	Succeeded by Paul Coffey
