= Rick Chartraw =

Venezuelan-born American ice hockey player (born 1954)

- Born: July 13, 1954 (age 72) Caracas, Venezuela
- Height: 6 ft 2 in (188 cm)
- Weight: 205 lb (93 kg; 14 st 9 lb)
- Position: Defense/Right wing
- Shot: Right
- Played for: Montreal Canadiens; Los Angeles Kings; New York Rangers; Edmonton Oilers
- National team: United States
- NHL draft: 10th overall, 1974; Montreal Canadiens
- WHA draft: 35th overall, 1974; San Diego Mariners
- Playing career: 1974–1993

Raymond Richard Chartraw (born July 13, 1954) is a Venezuelan-born American former professional ice hockey defenseman who played 420 games in the National Hockey League (NHL) between 1974 and 1984. He was a four-time Stanley Cup winner with the Montreal Canadiens. Selected tenth overall in the 1974 NHL entry draft, Chartraw was the first ever American skater drafted in the first round.

Chartraw was born in Caracas, Venezuela while his father was employed as an engineer. Upon moving back to the United States, Chartraw predominantly grew up in Erie, Pennsylvania where he learned to play hockey before moving to Canada as a teenager to play junior hockey for the Kitchener Rangers.

== Hockey career ==
Beginning his NHL career with the Montreal Canadiens in 1975, Chartraw spent seven seasons with the Canadiens before being traded to the Los Angeles Kings. He later played for the New York Rangers and Edmonton Oilers. Chartraw won a total of five Stanley Cups during his playing days: four with Montreal (1976 to 1979) and one with the Oilers (1984). Whereas he only played 24 regular season games and one playoff game in 1984 for Edmonton, Chartraw did not qualify for engravement of his name on the Stanley Cup. Chartraw also played for Team USA and participated in the 1976 Canada Cup.

== Career statistics ==
=== Regular season and playoffs ===
			Regular season					Playoffs
Season	Team	League	GP	G	A	Pts	PIM	GP	G	A	Pts	PIM
1971–72	Kitchener Rangers	OHA-Jr.	58	6	19	25	112	—	—	—	—	—
1972–73	Kitchener Rangers	OHA-Jr.	59	10	22	32	101	—	—	—	—	—
1973–74	Kitchener Rangers	OHA-Jr.	70	17	44	61	150	—	—	—	—	—
1974–75	Montreal Canadiens	NHL	12	0	0	0	6	—	—	—	—	—
1974–75	Nova Scotia Voyageurs	AHL	58	7	20	27	148	6	1	2	3	4
1975–76	Montreal Canadiens	NHL	16	1	3	4	25	2	0	0	0	0
1975–76	Nova Scotia Voyageurs	AHL	33	12	24	36	49	—	—	—	—	—
1976–77	Montreal Canadiens	NHL	43	3	4	7	59	13	2	1	3	17
1977–78	Montreal Canadiens	NHL	68	4	12	16	64	10	1	0	1	10
1978–79	Montreal Canadiens	NHL	62	5	11	16	29	16	2	1	3	24
1979–80	Montreal Canadiens	NHL	66	5	7	12	35	10	2	2	4	0
1980–81	Montreal Canadiens	NHL	14	0	0	0	4	—	—	—	—	—
1980–81	Los Angeles Kings	NHL	21	1	6	7	28	4	0	1	1	4
1981–82	Los Angeles Kings	NHL	33	2	8	10	56	10	0	2	2	17
1981–82	New Haven Nighthawks	AHL	33	3	9	12	39	—	—	—	—	—
1982–83	Los Angeles Kings	NHL	31	3	5	8	31	—	—	—	—	—
1982–83	New York Rangers	NHL	26	2	2	4	37	9	0	2	2	6
1983–84	New York Rangers	NHL	4	0	0	0	4	—	—	—	—	—
1983–84	Edmonton Oilers	NHL	24	2	6	8	21	1	0	0	0	2
1983–84	Tulsa Oilers	CHL	28	1	4	5	25	—	—	—	—	—
1992–93	Los Angeles Jets	SoCal-Sr.	4	2	2	4	6	—	—	—	—	—
NHL totals			420	28	64	92	399	75	7	9	16	80
AHL totals			124	22	53	75	236	6	1	2	3	4

=== International ===
Year	Team	Event	GP	G	A	Pts	PIM
1976	United States	CC	5	0	0	0	8

Preceded by Doug Risebrough	Montreal Canadiens first-round draft pick 1974	Succeeded by Mario Tremblay
