= Yvon Lambert =

Canadian ice hockey player (born 1950)

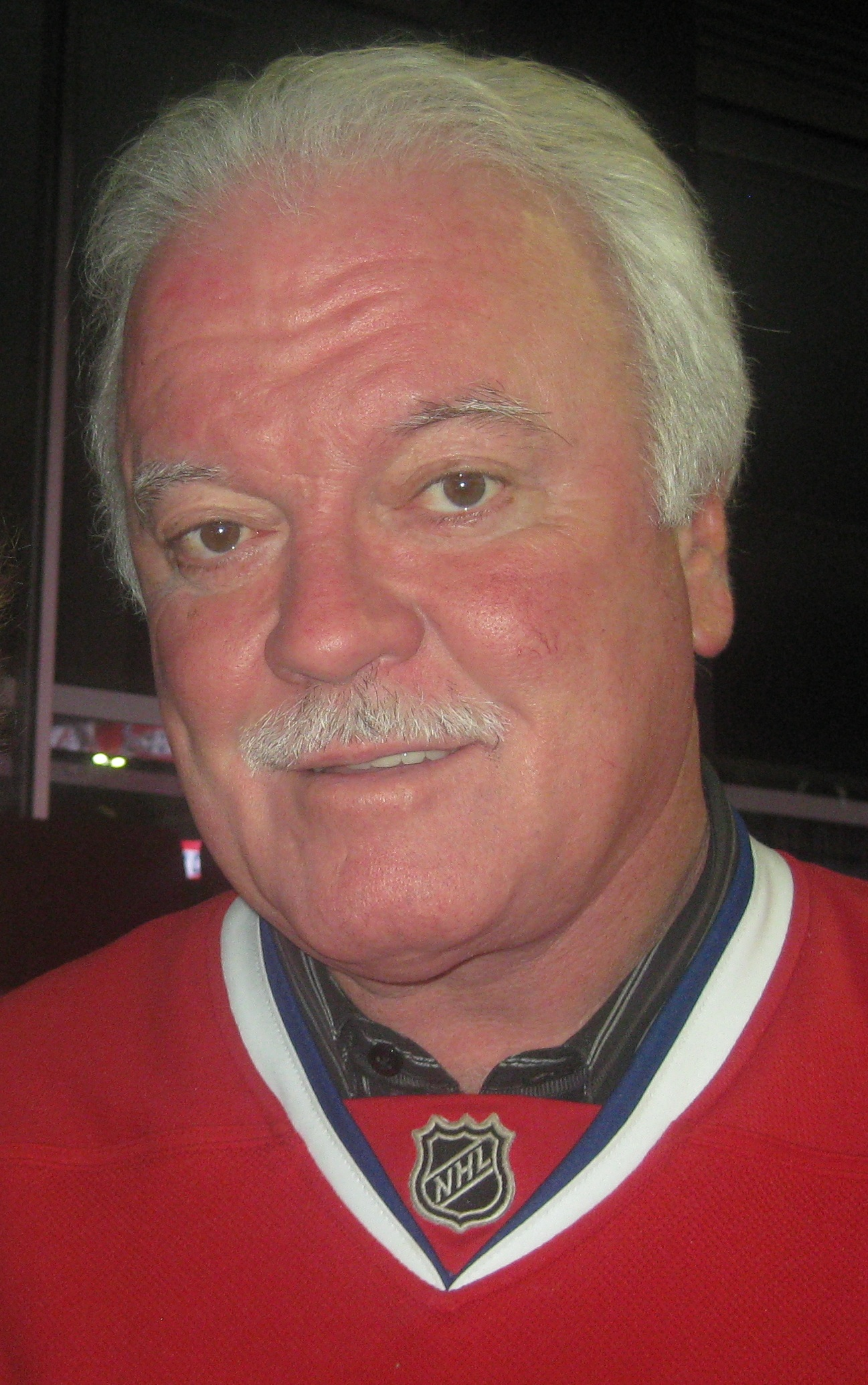
- Born: May 20, 1950 (age 76) Drummondville, Quebec, Canada
- Height: 6 ft 2 in (188 cm)
- Weight: 195 lb (88 kg; 13 st 13 lb)
- Position: Left wing
- Shot: Left
- Played for: Montreal Canadiens; Buffalo Sabres
- NHL draft: 40th overall, 1970; Detroit Red Wings
- Playing career: 1970–1984

Yvon Pierre Lambert (born May 20, 1950) is a Canadian former professional ice hockey forward.

== Hockey career ==
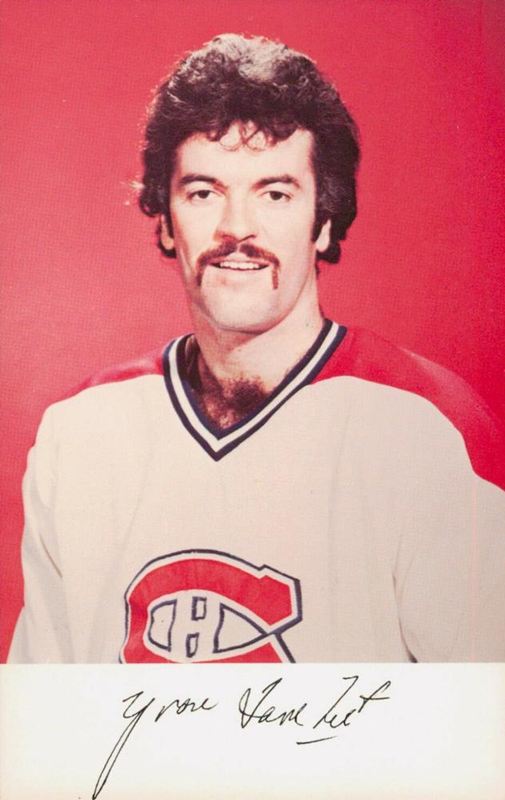
1979-80 card of Lambert for Montreal Canadiens

Lambert was born in Drummondville, Quebec. Although drafted in 1970 by the Detroit Red Wings, Lambert started his National Hockey League (NHL) career with the Montreal Canadiens in 1973. He spent nine years in Montreal before being traded to the Buffalo Sabres. Lambert is best known for scoring the winning goal in overtime of game seven of the 1979 Stanley Cup Semi-Finals against the Boston Bruins, the culmination of an exciting game most memorable for a career-damaging coaching error by Don Cherry with two minutes left in regulation. Lambert won four consecutive Stanley Cups with the Canadiens from 1976 to 1979. Lambert played his final two seasons with the Rochester Americans of the American Hockey League (AHL), winning the 1982-83 Calder Cup. He retired after the Americans lost to the Maine Mariners in Game 5 of the 1983-84 Calder Cup Finals.

After being traded to Montreal, a year after being drafted by the Red Wings, Lambert thought he would never make it to the NHL since the Canadiens had a young and talented squad. He desired to get back to Detroit, which had an aging squad at the time, including Gordie Howe and Alex Delvecchio, that made him push himself to perform well with the Port Huron Flags since every young player at time knew they would probably have a chance to replace these players.

After a great season with Port Huron, Ned Harkness, the Red Wings coach, told Lambert that if he stayed in form, he would have a good chance to be given another chance with the Red Wings the following season. In August 1972, Lambert was surprised by reading in the newspaper that his services were being retained by the Canadiens. He stated in French, "During the first day at the camp, at the forum of Montreal, there was 80 players and I find myself next to Henri Richard, Yvan Cournoyer, Serge Savard, Jacques Lemaire, and Larry Robinson. Whew! I felt so small".

== Career statistics ==
			Regular season					Playoffs
Season	Team	League	GP	G	A	Pts	PIM	GP	G	A	Pts	PIM
1968–69	Drummondville Rangers	QJAHL	—	29	37	66	—	—	—	—	—	—
1969–70	Drummondville Rangers	QMJHL	52	50	51	101	89	6	7	4	11	16
1970–71	Port Huron Flags	IHL	65	23	18	41	81	14	8	1	9	32
1971–72	Nova Scotia Voyageurs	AHL	67	18	21	39	116	15	4	4	8	28
1972–73	Nova Scotia Voyageurs	AHL	76	52	52	104	84	13	9	9	18	32
1972–73	Montreal Canadiens	NHL	1	0	0	0	0	—	—	—	—	—
1973–74	Montreal Canadiens	NHL	60	6	10	16	42	5	0	0	0	7
1974–75	Montreal Canadiens	NHL	80	32	35	67	74	11	4	2	6	0
1975–76	Montreal Canadiens	NHL	80	32	35	67	28	12	2	3	5	18
1976–77	Montreal Canadiens	NHL	79	24	28	52	50	14	3	3	6	12
1977–78	Montreal Canadiens	NHL	77	18	22	40	20	15	2	4	6	6
1978–79	Montreal Canadiens	NHL	79	26	40	66	26	16	5	6	11	16
1979–80	Montreal Canadiens	NHL	77	21	32	53	23	10	8	4	12	4
1980–81	Montreal Canadiens	NHL	73	22	32	54	39	3	0	0	0	2
1981–82	Buffalo Sabres	NHL	77	25	39	64	38	4	3	0	3	2
1982–83	Rochester Americans	AHL	79	26	22	48	10	12	2	4	6	2
1983–84	Rochester Americans	AHL	79	27	43	70	14	18	8	11	19	2
AHL totals			301	123	138	261	224	58	23	28	51	64
NHL totals			683	206	273	479	340	90	27	22	49	67

== Fan base ==
Before a playoff game between the Montreal Canadiens and the Boston Bruins, on May 6, 2014, Lambert met with thousands of fans in front of the Bell Centre in Montreal to encourage them.

Lambert also encourages and helps "Hockey Garage Leagues" to organize games internationally. He has helped this hockey international company get over 28,000 players to play internationally. He has also helped teams by coaching them.

He can still be found volunteering his time and efforts as a coach for the Ancien Canadiens. (Montreal Canadiens Old Timers hockey team).

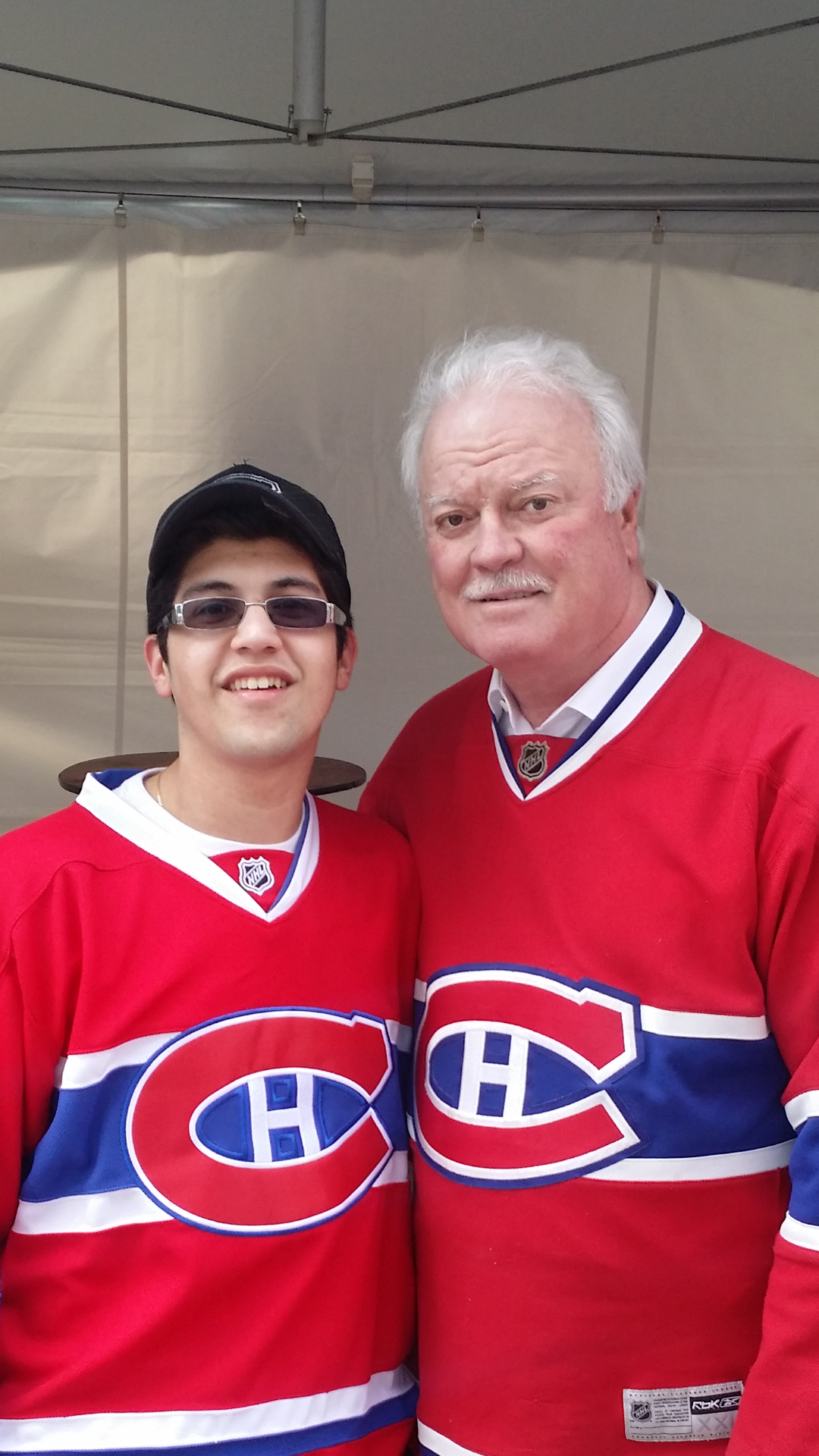
Yvon Lambert with a fan before the Montreal vs Boston 2014 Round 2 game, picture taken May 6th 2014
