= 1977 Stanley Cup Final =

1977 ice hockey championship series

	1	2	3	4	Total
Montreal Canadiens	7	3	4	2*	4
Boston Bruins	3	0	2	1*	0
- * – Denotes overtime period(s)
- Location(s): Montreal: Montreal Forum (1, 2); Boston: Boston Garden (3, 4)
- Coaches: Montreal: Scotty Bowman; Boston: Don Cherry
- Captains: Montreal: Yvan Cournoyer; Boston: Johnny Bucyk
- Dates: May 7–14, 1977
- MVP: Guy Lafleur (Canadiens)
- Series-winning goal: Jacques Lemaire (4:32, OT)
- Hall of Famers: Canadiens: Yvan Cournoyer (1982; did not play); Ken Dryden (1983); Bob Gainey (1992); Guy Lafleur (1988); Guy Lapointe (1993); Jacques Lemaire (1984); Larry Robinson (1995); Serge Savard (1986); Steve Shutt (1993); Bruins: Johnny Bucyk (1981); Gerry Cheevers (1985); Brad Park (1988); Jean Ratelle (1985); Coaches: Scotty Bowman (1991); Officials: Neil Armstrong (1991); John D'Amico (1993); Matt Pavelich (1987); Andy Van Hellemond (1999)
- Networks: Canada: (English): CBC (French): SRC; United States: (English): NHL Network (national), WSBK-TV (Boston)
- Announcers: (CBC) Danny Gallivan, Dick Irvin Jr., Don Marshall (1), and Red Storey (2) (SRC) Rene Lecavalier and Gilles Tremblay (NHLN) Marv Albert, Tim Ryan, Stan Mikita (1), Garry Unger (2), Chico Resch (3), Don Awrey (4) (WSBK) Fred Cusick and Johnny Peirson

The 1977 Stanley Cup Final was the championship series of the National Hockey League's (NHL) 1976–77 season, and the culmination of the 1977 Stanley Cup playoffs. It was contested between the Boston Bruins and the defending champion Montreal Canadiens. The Bruins were making their first appearance in the final series since their loss in the 1974 Final. The Canadiens would win the best-of-seven series four games to none, to win their second straight Stanley Cup championship, and 20th overall.

== Paths to the Finals ==
Montreal defeated the St. Louis Blues 4–0 and the New York Islanders 4–2 to advance to the final.

Boston defeated the Los Angeles Kings 4–2 and the Philadelphia Flyers 4–0 to make it to the final.

== Game summaries ==
Jacques Lemaire scored three game-winning goals, including the Cup-winner in overtime. Guy Lafleur won the Conn Smythe Trophy for scoring nine goals and 17 assists during the playoffs. Yvan Cournoyer would miss the entire postseason for Montreal after he had suffered a herniated disc during the regular season.

=== Game one ===
May 7	Boston Bruins	3–7	Montreal Canadiens	Montreal Forum	Recap

Scoring summary
Period	Team	Goal	Assist(s)	Time	Score
1st	MTL	Doug Risebrough (1)	Yvon Lambert (2) and Guy Lapointe (6)	01:45	1–0 MTL
1st	MTL	Yvon Lambert (2) – pp	Larry Robinson (8) and Doug Jarvis (7)	09:06	2–0 MTL
1st	BOS	Brad Park (2)	Jean Ratelle (12)	05:23	2–1 MTL
1st	MTL	Mario Tremblay (2)	Serge Savard (6) and Guy Lapointe (7)	14:35	3–1 MTL
2nd	MTL	Jacques Lemaire (4)	Guy Lafleur (11)	05:08	4–1 MTL
2nd	BOS	Terry O'Reilly (5)	Brad Park (7)	11:54	4–2 MTL
2nd	BOS	Bobby Schmautz (10) – pp	Brad Park (8)	16:35	4–3 MTL
3rd	MTL	Rick Chartraw (2)	Pete Mahovlich (3) and Murray Wilson (6)	00:59	5–3 MTL
3rd	MTL	Mario Tremblay (3)	Yvon Lambert (3) and Pete Mahovlich (4)	02:04	6–3 MTL
3rd	MTL	Yvon Lambert (3)	Doug Risebrough (3) and Serge Savard (7)	13:58	7–3 MTL
Penalty summary
Period	Team	Player	Penalty	Time	PIM
1st	BOS	Brad Park	Tripping	03:41	2:00
1st	MTL	Pierre Bouchard	High-sticking	10:48	2:00
1st	BOS	Wayne Cashman	Elbowing	18:08	2:00
1st	BOS	Wayne Cashman	Fighting – major	18:08	5:00
1st	MTL	Mario Tremblay	Fighting – major	18:08	5:00
2nd	BOS	Terry O'Reilly	Roughing	03:31	2:00
2nd	MTL	Doug Risebrough	Roughing	03:31	2:00
2nd	BOS	Mike Milbury	Slashing	10:55	2:00
2nd	MTL	Murray Wilson	Slashing	10:55	2:00
2nd	MTL	Yvon Lambert	Tripping	15:03	2:00
2nd	BOS	Don Marcotte	Elbowing	16:55	2:00
3rd	BOS	Mike Milbury	Elbowing	07:42	2:00
3rd	BOS	Don Marcotte	Tripping	07:57	2:00
3rd	BOS	Gerry Cheevers	High-sticking	09:48	2:00
3rd	MTL	Yvon Lambert	High-sticking	09:48	2:00
3rd	MTL	Bob Gainey	Interference	11:07	2:00
3rd	MTL	Guy Lafleur	Slashing	15:57	2:00
3rd	BOS	John Wensink	Elbowing	19:06	2:00

Shots by period
Team	1	2	3	Total
Boston	8	3	9	20
Montreal	7	9	8	24

=== Game two ===
May 10	Boston Bruins	0–3	Montreal Canadiens	Montreal Forum	Recap

Scoring summary
Period	Team	Goal	Assist(s)	Time	Score
1st	None				
2nd	MTL	Pete Mahovlich (4) – pp	Steve Shutt (8) and Larry Robinson (9)	07:43	1–0 MTL
2nd	MTL	Doug Risebrough (2)	Guy Lafleur (12) and Steve Shutt (9)	12:07	2–0 MTL
3rd	MTL	Steve Shutt (7)	Guy Lafleur (13) and Pierre Bouchard (1)	05:40	3–0 MTL
Penalty summary
Period	Team	Player	Penalty	Time	PIM
1st	BOS	Gregg Sheppard	Tripping	02:00	2:00
1st	MTL	Larry Robinson	Boarding	04:02	2:00
1st	BOS	Gary Doak	Hooking	06:04	2:00
1st	MTL	Pierre Bouchard	Holding	12:46	2:00
1st	BOS	Peter McNab	Tripping	14:55	2:00
2nd	BOS	Rick Smith	High-sticking	06:24	2:00
2nd	BOS	Mike Milbury	Slashing	06:44	2:00
2nd	MTL	Guy Lafleur	Holding	06:44	2:00
2nd	MTL	Bob Gainey	Kneeing	08:34	2:00
2nd	BOS	Gregg Sheppard	Hooking	16:15	2:00
2nd	MTL	Yvon Lambert	Hooking	16:34	2:00
3rd	BOS	Terry O'Reilly	Roughing	01:50	2:00
3rd	MTL	Pete Mahovlich	Roughing	01:50	2:00
3rd	BOS	Mike Milbury	Hooking	08:09	2:00
3rd	BOS	Stan Jonathan	Roughing	11:56	2:00
3rd	MTL	Rick Chartraw	Roughing	11:56	2:00
3rd	MTL	Rick Chartraw	Tripping	19:13	2:00
3rd	BOS	Mike Milbury	Roughing	19:47	2:00
3rd	BOS	Mike Milbury	Game misconduct	19:47	10:00
3rd	BOS	Terry O'Reilly	Charging	19:47	2:00
3rd	MTL	Pierre Bouchard	Charging	19:47	2:00

Shots by period
Team	1	2	3	Total
Boston	7	9	6	22
Montreal	3	8	8	19

=== Game three ===
May 12	Montreal Canadiens	4–2	Boston Bruins	Boston Garden	Recap

Scoring summary
Period	Team	Goal	Assist(s)	Time	Score
1st	MTL	Guy Lafleur (8) – pp	Guy Lapointe (8) and Pete Mahovlich (5)	04:08	1–0 MTL
1st	MTL	Steve Shutt (8) – pp	Jacques Lemaire (11) and Guy Lafleur (14)	07:58	2–0 MTL
1st	MTL	Jacques Lemaire (5) – pp	Guy Lapointe (9) and Guy Lafleur (15)	18:29	3–0 MTL
2nd	BOS	Gregg Sheppard (5)	Rick Middleton (3) and Wayne Cashman (8)	06:32	3–1 MTL
1st	MTL	Guy Lafleur (9)	Steve Shutt (10) and Jacques Lemaire (12)	12:52	4–1 MTL
1st	BOS	Peter McNab (5) – pp	Rick Middleton (4) and Brad Park (9)	18:34	4–2 MTL
1st	Penalty summary				
Period	Team	Player	Penalty	Time	PIM
1st	BOS	Rick Smith	High-sticking	01:34	2:00
1st	BOS	Bench (served by John Wensink)	Too many men on the ice	03:04	2:00
1st	MTL	Murray Wilson	Hooking	05:24	2:00
1st	BOS	Wayne Cashman	Holding	07:02	2:00
1st	MTL	Bob Gainey	Slashing	09:18	2:00
1st	BOS	Wayne Cashman	Elbowing	09:27	2:00
1st	MTL	Larry Robinson	High-sticking	09:27	2:00
1st	MTL	Bob Gainey	Interference	11:30	2:00
1st	BOS	Wayne Cashman	High-sticking	11:50	2:00
1st	MTL	Murray Wilson	Tripping	12:56	2:00
1st	MTL	Bob Gainey	Leaving the penalty box	13:37	2:00
1st	BOS	Stan Jonathan	Boarding	16:57	2:00
2nd	BOS	Rick Smith	Boarding	09:19	2:00
2nd	MTL	Jim Roberts	High-sticking	09:19	2:00
2nd	MTL	Bob Gainey	Hooking	10:31	2:00
2nd	BOS	Gary Doak	Interference	15:26	2:00
3rd	MTL	Jim Roberts	Hooking	16:53	2:00

Shots by period
Team	1	2	3	Total
Montreal	6	8	5	19
Boston	10	7	8	25

=== Game four ===
May 14	Montreal Canadiens	2–1	OT	Boston Bruins	Boston Garden	Recap

Scoring summary
Period	Team	Goal	Assist(s)	Time	Score
1st	BOS	Bobby Schmautz (11)	Brad Park (10)	11:38	1–0 BOS
2nd	MTL	Jacques Lemaire (6)	Guy Lafleur (16) and Larry Robinson (10)	01:34	1–1
3rd	None				
OT	MTL	Jacques Lemaire (7)	Guy Lafleur (17)	04:32	2–1 MTL
Penalty summary
Period	Team	Player	Penalty	Time	PIM
1st	BOS	John Wensink	Charging	04:25	2:00
1st	MTL	Jacques Lemaire	Interference	09:32	2:00
1st	MTL	Pete Mahovlich	Holding	18:17	2:00
2nd	MTL	Larry Robinson	Tripping	07:55	2:00
2nd	BOS	Gregg Sheppard	Hooking	08:19	2:00
2nd	MTL	Bench (served by Pete Mahovlich)	Too many men on the ice	10:25	2:00
2nd	BOS	Terry O'Reilly	Hooking	13:07	2:00
3rd	None				
OT	None				

Shots by period
Team	1	2	3	OT	Total
Montreal	4	12	8	4	28
Boston	8	8	10	0	26

== Team rosters ==
=== Boston Bruins ===
No.	Nat	Player	Pos	S/G	Age	Acquired	Birthplace
1	(Canada)	Gilles Gilbert	G	L	28	1973	Saint-Esprit, Quebec
6	(Canada)	Darryl Edestrand	D	L	31	1973	Strathroy, Ontario
8	(United States)	Peter McNab	C	L	24	1976	Vancouver, British Columbia
9	(Canada)	Johnny Bucyk (C)	LW	L	41	1957	Edmonton, Alberta
10	(Canada)	Jean Ratelle	C	L	36	1975	Lac Saint-Jean, Quebec
11	(Canada)	Bobby Schmautz	RW	R	32	1973	Saskatoon, Saskatchewan
12	(Canada)	Wayne Cashman	LW	R	31	1965	Kingston, Ontario
14	(Canada)	Dave Forbes	LW	L	20	1973	Montreal, Quebec
16	(Canada)	Rick Middleton	RW	R	23	1976	Toronto, Ontario
17	(Canada)	Stan Jonathan	LW	L	21	1975	Ohsweken, Ontario
18	(Netherlands)	John Wensink	LW	L	24	1976	Cornwall, Ontario
19	(Canada)	Gregg Sheppard	C	L	28	1972	North Battleford, Saskatchewan
20	(Canada)	Al Sims	D	L	24	1973	Toronto, Ontario
21	(Canada)	Don Marcotte	LW	L	30	1967	Arthabaska, Quebec
22	(Canada)	Brad Park	D	L	28	1975	Toronto, Ontario
23	(Canada)	Rick Smith	D	L	28	1972	Kingston, Ontario
24	(Canada)	Terry O'Reilly	RW	R	25	1971	Niagara Falls, Ontario
25	(Canada)	Gary Doak	D	R	31	1972	Goderich, Ontario
26	(United States)	Mike Milbury	D	L	24	1975	Brighton, Massachusetts
27	(United States)	Earl Anderson	RW	R	26	1974	Roseau, Minnesota
28	(Finland)	Matti Hagman	C	L	21	1978	Helsinki, Finland
29	(Canada)	Doug Halward	D	L	21	1975	Toronto, Ontario
30	(Canada)	Gerry Cheevers	G	L	36	1976	St. Catharines, Ontario

=== Montreal Canadiens ===
No.	Nat	Player	Pos	S/G	Age	Acquired	Birthplace
1	(Canada)	Michel Larocque	G	L	25	1972	Hull, Quebec
2	(United States)	Bill Nyrop	D	L	24	1972	Washington, D.C.
5	(Canada)	Guy Lapointe	D	L	29	1969	Montreal, Quebec
6	(Canada)	Jimmy Roberts	RW	R	37	1971	Toronto, Ontario
8	(Canada)	Doug Risebrough	C	L	23	1974	Guelph, Ontario
10	(Canada)	Guy Lafleur	RW	R	25	1971	Montreal, Quebec
11	(Canada)	Yvon Lambert	LW	L	26	1971	Drummondville, Quebec
12	(Canada)	Yvan Cournoyer (C)	RW	L	33	1963	Montreal, Quebec
14	(Canada)	Mario Tremblay	RW	R	20	1974	Alma, Quebec
15	(Canada)	Rejean Houle	RW	L	27	1969	Rouyn, Quebec
17	(Canada)	Murray Wilson	LW	L	25	1971	Toronto, Canada
18	(Canada)	Serge Savard	D	L	31	1966	Landrienne, Quebec
19	(Canada)	Larry Robinson	D	L	25	1971	Winchester, Ontario
20	(Canada)	Peter Mahovlich	C	L	30	1969	Timmins, Ontario
21	(Canada)	Doug Jarvis	C	L	22	1975	Brantford, Ontario
22	(Canada)	Steve Shutt	LW	L	24	1972	North York, Ontario
23	(Canada)	Bob Gainey	LW	L	22	1973	Peterborough, Ontario
24	(Canada)	Pierre Mondou	C	R	21	1975	Sorel, Quebec
25	(Canada)	Jacques Lemaire	C	L	31	1967	LaSalle, Quebec
26	(Canada)	Pierre Bouchard	D	L	29	1965	Longueuil, Quebec
27	(United States)	Rick Chartraw	D	R	22	1974	Caracas, Venezuela
28	(United States)	Mike Polich	C	L	24	1977	Hibbing, Minnesota
29	(Canada)	Ken Dryden	G	L	29	1964	Hamilton, Ontario

== Stanley Cup engraving ==
The 1977 Stanley Cup was presented to Canadiens captain Yvan Cournoyer by NHL President Clarence Campbell following the Canadiens 2–1 overtime win over the Bruins in game four. This was the last year for Clarence Campbell to present the Stanley Cup. He was succeeded by John Ziegler Jr. the following season.

The following Canadiens players and staff had their names engraved on the Stanley Cup

1976–77 Montreal Canadiens

=== Players ===
Centres

- 8 Doug Risebrough
- 20 Peter Mahovlich
- 21 Doug Jarvis
- 24 Pierre Mondou
- 25 Jacques Lemaire
- 28 Mike Polich

Wingers

- 6 Jim Roberts
- 10 Guy Lafleur
- 11 Yvon Lambert
- 12 Yvan Cournoyer* (Captain)
- 14 Mario Tremblay
- 15 Rejean Houle
- 17 Murray Wilson †
- 22 Steve Shutt
- 23 Bob Gainey

Defencemen

- 2 Bill Nyrop
- 5 Guy Lapointe
- 18 Serge Savard
- 19 Larry Robinson
- 26 Pierre Bouchard
- 27 Rick Chartraw

Goaltenders

- 1 Michel Larocque
- 29 Ken Dryden
- * Did not play or dress in the Final.^{[A]}

=== Coaching and administrative staff ===
- Jacques Courtois (President), Sam Pollock (Vice President/General Manager)
- Jean Beliveau (Vice President – Director of Corporate Relations), William Scotty Bowman (Head Coach)
- Peter Bronfman (Chairman/Owner/Director), Edward Bronfman (Executive Director/Owner)
- Claude Ruel (Director of Player Development), Floyd Curry (Asst. General Manager), Ron Caron (Asst. General Manager)
- Pierre Meilleur (Asst. Trainer), Eddy Palchak (Trainer)

=== Stanley Cup engraving ===
- ^{^A} #18 Serge Savard (D) served as interim captain when #12 Yvan Cournoyer (RW) missed the whole playoffs due to a back injury.
- Murray Wilson's name was misspelled in 1973, 1976, 1977 as MURRY WILSON, missing an "A". Murray Wilson was spelled correctly on the Stanley Cup in 1978. Wilson's name was also spelled correctly on the Replica Cup all 4 times. Bob Gainey was misspelled on the Stanley Cup as ROBERT GAINY, missing an "E". When the Replica Cup was created in 1992–93, ROBERT GAINEY was spelled correctly with 1977 Montreal.
- #3 Brian Engblom (D) did not play in the regular season, but played in 2 playoff games (none in the Finals). His name was left off the Cup because he did not qualify. Engblom also won the Calder Cup with Mike Polich and Pierre Mondou in 1977 with the Nova Scotia Voyagers.

== See also ==
- 1976–77 NHL season

Preceded by Montreal Canadiens; 1976	Montreal Canadiens; Stanley Cup champions 1977	Succeeded by Montreal Canadiens; 1978
