= Mike Milbury =

American ice hockey player

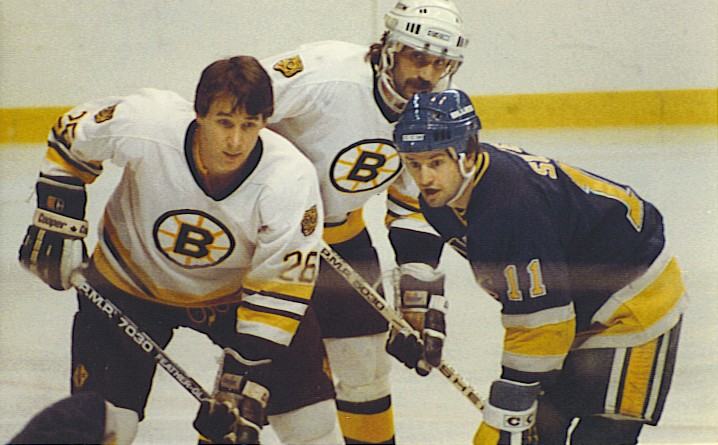
- Milbury with the Boston Bruins in 1985
- Born: June 17, 1952 (age 74) Boston, Massachusetts, U.S.
- Height: 6 ft 2 in (188 cm)
- Weight: 205 lb (93 kg; 14 st 9 lb)
- Position: Defense
- Shot: Left
- Played for: Boston Bruins
- National team: United States
- NHL draft: Undrafted
- Playing career: 1974–1987

Michael James Milbury (born June 17, 1952) is an American former professional ice hockey player and current sports announcer. He played for twelve seasons in the National Hockey League (NHL), all for the Boston Bruins. He helped the Bruins reach the Stanley Cup Final in 1977 and 1978. He was inducted into the United States Hockey Hall of Fame in 2006.

Milbury later served as assistant general manager under Harry Sinden and head coach for Boston, as well as general manager and head coach for the New York Islanders. He served as a television color commentator and analyst for the NHL on NBC from 2007 to 2021.

== Playing career ==
=== Colgate University ===
Milbury was a three-year letterman at Colgate University from 1972 to 1974. A defenseman who wore uniform number 7, he was the team's co-leader in assists with 19 in his junior year. As a senior captain, he had his best season with the Red Raiders with 30 points (4 goals, 26 assists). He also led the squad in penalty minutes in both campaigns with 68 in 1973 and 85 in 1974. His totals in 76 games played were 6 goals, 55 assists, 61 points and 203 penalty minutes.

=== Boston Bruins ===
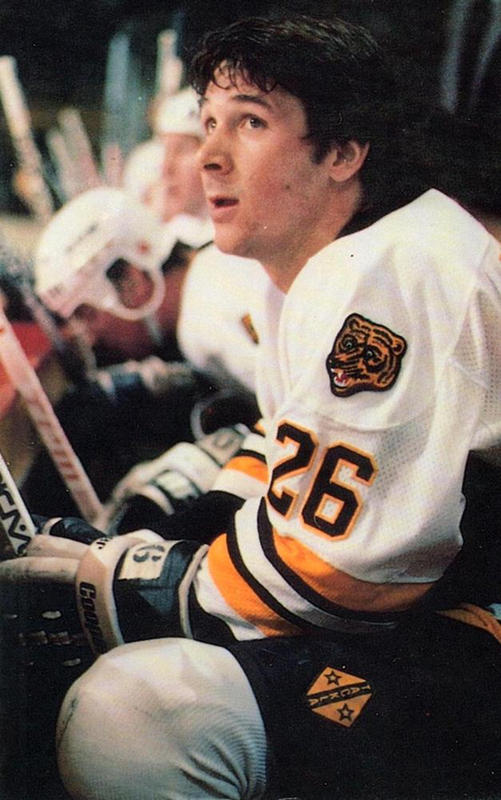
1984-85 postcard of Milbury for Boston Bruins

Immediately after the conclusion of his college hockey career, Milbury played in five games with the Boston Braves, the Bruins' top farm team, in 1974. He signed with the Bruins as a free agent on November 5, 1974, and spent the next two campaigns with the Rochester Americans, the team's new American Hockey League (AHL) affiliate. In both seasons he led the club in penalty minutes with 246 in 1975 and 199 in 1976, finishing fourth and third respectively in the AHL.

Milbury was promoted to the Bruins late in the 1975–76 season, playing in eleven of twelve Stanley Cup playoff matches. Prior to the following NHL campaign, he was a member of the United States team at the inaugural 1976 Canada Cup, getting a goal and three assists in five contests.

In his first three full years with the Bruins, his heavily aggressive style of play was a perfect fit for the overachieving team coached by Don Cherry and featuring similar tough players such as Terry O'Reilly, John Wensink and Stan Jonathan. Milbury helped his team reach consecutive Stanley Cup Final in 1977 and 1978, with Boston losing both times to the Montreal Canadiens in four and six games respectively. Throughout his career he was a hard-nosed defenseman who personified real toughness. The rugged, often combative stay-at-home defenseman had his best statistical season in 1977-78 scoring 8 goals and 38 points.

In his twelve seasons as a defenseman for the Bruins, he appeared in the postseason eleven times. He accumulated more than 200 penalty minutes in 1981 (222) and 1983 (216) and surpassed 100 six other times. He also served as the club's representative with the NHL Players' Association and was outspoken on several controversial issues, notably the role of Alan Eagleson.

In 2023 he would be named one of the top 100 Bruins players of all time.

==== Shoe incident ====
Milbury gained notoriety for what occurred following a 4–3 Bruins victory over the New York Rangers at Madison Square Garden on December 23, 1979. During an on-ice fray between the players from both sides, a Rangers fan cut Stan Jonathan's face with a rolled-up program and grabbed his hockey stick. Terry O'Reilly climbed over the Plexiglas and went into the stands in pursuit of the offender, followed by Peter McNab and other teammates. Milbury, who had actually reached the visitors locker room when his teammates started going into the stands, raced back to join his colleagues in the brawl. He caught the unruly spectator, removed one of his shoes and, while holding the heel end, slapped him hard once with the sole side before being restrained. Subsequently, NHL president John Ziegler suspended O'Reilly for eight games and McNab and Milbury for six, with each being fined $500. This incident also resulted in the installation of higher glass panels enclosing rinks in hockey arenas.

Milbury was later inducted into the U.S hockey hall of fame in 2006.

== Coaching career ==
=== Boston Bruins ===
Following his playing career, Milbury became head coach of the Bruins' AHL affiliate in Maine on July 16, 1987. In his first season, the Mariners captured the division title and Milbury was named AHL Coach of the Year and the Hockey News' Minor Pro Coach of the Year.

Milbury was then promoted to head coach (replacing Terry O'Reilly) and assistant general manager of the Boston Bruins in the 1989–90 season, leading the team to the Presidents' Trophy and an appearance in the Stanley Cup Final. He was named Executive of the Year by the Sporting News and coach of the year by Hockey News.

The following year, he led the Bruins to another 100 point season and division title. He also served as head coach of the Wales Conference team at the 1991 All-Star Game, where he generated some controversy by including enforcer Chris Nilan and checker Brian Skrudland ahead of players such as Kirk Muller and Guy Lafleur. However, Nilan and Skrudland both missed the game due to injury. As a result of Milbury's controversial roster picks, the league's board of governors changed their policy so that future teams would be chosen by committee. After the close of the 1991 Stanley Cup playoffs, Milbury announced his departure as head coach, stating, "I'm leaving (as coach) because I want to try something else. I only have one life to live and I want to try it a lot of different ways. I'm going to be 39 in a couple of weeks and I want to try some different things. In life, you only do it once. At this time in my life, with the opportunities given to me to move into full-time management, it was too good to pass up."

=== Boston College Eagles ===
On March 30, 1994, Boston College Eagles announced that Mike Milbury would become the head coach of the hockey team, replacing Steve Cedorchuk. However, Milbury abruptly left before coaching a game, citing "philosophical differences" with the school's athletics department in a press conference held on June 2, 1994. BC eventually hired legendary coach Jerry York, then the head coach at Bowling Green University, to replace Milbury, while Milbury took work as a television studio analyst for ESPN.

=== New York Islanders ===
Milbury was hired as the Islanders' coach in 1995 and within three months became the general manager as well, but he turned the coaching duties over to Rick Bowness in January 1997. During several of the years that Milbury served as Islanders GM, the team's ownership mandated that he operate the team on an austere budget. In 1999, he was forced to trade star scorer Žigmund Pálffy because team owners no longer wanted to pay his multimillion-dollar contract.

Following the 1995–96 and the 1996-97 NHL seasons, he served as the general manager of Team USA at the World Championships. His 1995-96 team won the Bronze medal, marking the first time in 34 years that the U.S. had earned a medal at the Worlds.

However, Milbury has also been criticized for the many seemingly poor decisions he made in which payroll or orders from upper management were not factors. Many young players and prospects that Milbury traded away went on to have distinguished careers, often eclipsing those of the players he received in return. He traded away defensemen Zdeno Chara, Wade Redden, Bryan Berard, Eric Brewer, Darius Kasparaitis, and Bryan McCabe; goaltenders Roberto Luongo and Tommy Salo; as well as forwards Olli Jokinen, Todd Bertuzzi, Tim Connolly, Jean-Pierre Dumont, and Raffi Torres. Milbury has also come under fire for his poor draft-day decisions such as choosing Rick DiPietro first overall in 2000 over Dany Heatley and Marian Gaborik, as well as his decision to include the 2001 second overall draft pick (Jason Spezza) as part of the Alexei Yashin trade.

In June 2006, Milbury stepped down as Islanders GM to accept a position as senior vice president of Charles Wang's sports holdings. In an appearance on Mike and the Mad Dog, Wang did not challenge the hosts' suggestion that he had fired Milbury. In May 2007, Milbury resigned his position with Wang, saying that he missed making hockey-related decisions and would be open to a hockey operations job in another organization.

== Television work ==
American networks NESN, NBC and Versus, plus Canada's TSN, hired Milbury as a studio analyst for the 2007–08 season. He also served as the studio analyst and color commentator for games involving the Boston Bruins, and for the past two years, he has participated in the broadcast of the Winter Classic. In July 2008, Milbury signed a two-year contract with the Canadian Broadcasting Corporation's Hockey Night in Canada. In 2009, Milbury opined that a ban on fighting in ice hockey would lead to the "pansification" of the NHL.

=== Comments about women in hockey ===
Since joining NBC, Milbury has made several comments and jokes about and at the expense of women and women in hockey. In June 2011, after game four of the 2011 Stanley Cup Final, he referred to Vancouver Canucks twins Daniel Sedin and Henrik Sedin as Thelma & Louise as the Bruins defeated the Canucks 4–0 to even the series at 2–2. Henrik (along with Canucks' backup goaltender Cory Schneider) responded with a jab at Milbury for trading Roberto Luongo as GM of the Islanders in 2000 (which was unpopular among Islander fans at the time), while Daniel said, "I don't know how he looks at women. I would be pretty mad if I was a woman." Commenting on an April 2012 game between the Pittsburgh Penguins and Philadelphia Flyers, he said that then-Penguins coach Dan Bylsma "should have taken off his skirt and gone over (to the Flyers' bench)" to confront his counterpart, Peter Laviolette. In August 2020, Milbury made more disparaging comments about women during the 2020 Stanley Cup Playoffs (see section below), which ultimately led to his firing by NBC.

=== P. K. Subban ===
Milbury has received criticism for comments he made about P. K. Subban in 2017. In April, Milbury called Subban "a clown" and said he deserved a "rap on the head" from his head coach for his pre-game routine which included dancing on the ice during warmups. During a 2017 Stanley Cup Final game in June between Subban's Nashville Predators and the Pittsburgh Penguins, Subban and Sidney Crosby engaged in a fight that ended with Subban's head bouncing off the ice. Milbury said after the game that Subban "had it coming." When the series moved to Nashville, several fans taunted Milbury over his comments, including some who claimed NBC tried to "bribe" them with a hat in return for handing over their signs that were critical of Milbury which might be picked up on camera.

=== 2020 Stanley Cup playoffs ===
During the 2020 Stanley Cup playoffs, Milbury made a series of controversial comments that attracted a wide range of responses, from mockery to calls for him to lose his job with NBC.

On August 15, Milbury criticized the decision made by Tuukka Rask of the Boston Bruins to opt out of the playoffs in the middle of a series, saying "(Nobody's) simply opted to leave the bubble just because they didn't want to be here and they needed to be with their family." This followed comments Milbury had made two weeks earlier, where he claimed to be a "fan" of Rask while questioning his commitment to hockey after watching an interview in which Rask talked about changing his newborn daughter's diapers. It was revealed four days later on August 19 that a medical emergency involving Rask's daughter drove him to leave the team.

On August 20, while calling a game between the Washington Capitals and New York Islanders, Milbury praised the bubble system designed to isolate teams during the COVID-19 pandemic because there were "not even any women here to disrupt your concentration." His comments received quick condemnation from the NHL. Milbury apologized the next day, and NBC released a statement saying the issue had been addressed, though they did not publicly elaborate any further, nor did they indicate whether Milbury would face any discipline. The Washington Post reported that NBC had removed Milbury from that evening's broadcast schedule and did not announce the following weekend's broadcasting teams until Saturday morning. Milbury announced on August 22 that he would be stepping away from the broadcast booth for the remainder of the playoffs, so as not to be a distraction. On January 11, 2021, NBC announced that Milbury's tenure with the network was done and he would not be part of its broadcast lineup for the 2021 NHL season, its final season broadcasting NHL games.

In a wide-ranging interview with The Boston Globe in July 2021, Milbury defended his original comments, saying "I want to explain the comment from that day. As a player and coach in the league, I've been on a lot of road trips and around a lot of guys that are young, fit, well-compensated, have celebrity status, and when they go on the road they play hard and they party hard. And a lot of their attention is on women, and I certainly don't mean that in a bad way," and added, "What if I had said there aren't any dogs here to distract the players? Or any wives? Or children? Do I have to describe the whole pantheon of the human race in order for it to be politically correct?"

== Personal life ==
Milbury still resides in Massachusetts, where he is the father of 6 and a grandfather to 9.

=== Assault charge ===
In December 2011, Milbury was charged on three counts stemming from an incident taking place on December 9, 2011, during a Pee-Wee hockey game he was coaching—assault and battery on a child, threats to commit a crime, and disorderly conduct. He was never arrested. According to The Boston Herald, Milbury, an assistant coach for the Boch Blazers Pee-Wee hockey team, intervened in a fight on the ice during the game between his own son and a 12-year-old boy from the opposing team. Milbury allegedly "charged out onto the rink and verbally berated and grabbed and shook the 12-year-old opposing player." The boy's mother described Milbury's actions as "horrific", while his father accused Milbury of grabbing and shaking his son, and lifting him above the ice for thirty seconds. Milbury, through his lawyer, denied all charges. The owner of the Blazers defended Milbury's actions, saying he was told Milbury "did everything right... [he] didn't touch any kid inappropriately." NBC and Milbury reached a mutual agreement to take Milbury off air while he dealt with the situation.

Milbury appeared before a clerk magistrate in Brookline District Court in late December 2011 to answer the charges. After a closed-door hearing which lasted several hours, the magistrate determined there wasn't enough evidence to sustain any of the three charges, which were all dropped. Milbury expressed gratitude for the court's findings, and affirmed that he believed he acted responsibly as a "supervisor" of the ice (and claimed the referee had already left the rink), and said he would do the same thing if the situation arose in the future.

== Awards and honors ==
- Inducted into the United States Hockey Hall of Fame in 2006
- Named one of the top 100 best Boston Bruins players of all time
- Coached in the 1991 All-Star Game
- Louis A. R. Piero Memorial Award 1988
- Served as general manager of the 1996 U.S. hockey team that won bronze medal at that years world championship
- In 2021 he was honored by the TD Garden's sports museum as a member of that year's class, also being given the hockey legacy award.

== Career statistics ==
=== Regular season and playoffs ===
Total			Regular season					Playoffs
Season	Team	League	GP	G	A	Pts	PIM	GP	G	A	Pts	PIM
1971–72	Walpole Rebels	HS-MA	—	—	—	—	—	—	—	—	—	—
1972–73	Colgate University	ECAC	27	4	25	29	81	—	—	—	—	—
1973–74	Colgate University	ECAC	23	2	19	21	68	—	—	—	—	—
1973–74	Boston Braves	AHL	5	0	0	0	7	—	—	—	—	—
1974–75	Rochester Americans	AHL	71	2	15	17	246	8	0	3	3	24
1975–76	Boston Bruins	NHL	3	0	0	0	9	11	0	0	0	29
1975–76	Rochester Americans	AHL	73	3	15	18	199	3	0	1	1	13
1976–77	Boston Bruins	NHL	77	6	18	24	166	13	2	2	4	47
1977–78	Boston Bruins	NHL	80	8	30	38	151	15	1	8	9	27
1978–79	Boston Bruins	NHL	74	1	34	35	149	11	1	7	8	7
1979–80	Boston Bruins	NHL	72	10	13	23	59	10	0	2	2	50
1980–81	Boston Bruins	NHL	77	0	18	18	222	2	0	1	1	10
1981–82	Boston Bruins	NHL	51	2	10	12	71	11	0	4	4	6
1982–83	Boston Bruins	NHL	78	9	15	24	216	—	—	—	—	—
1983–84	Boston Bruins	NHL	74	2	17	19	159	3	0	0	0	12
1984–85	Boston Bruins	NHL	78	3	13	16	152	5	0	0	0	10
1985–86	Boston Bruins	NHL	22	2	5	7	102	1	0	0	0	17
1986–87	Boston Bruins	NHL	68	6	16	22	96	4	0	0	0	4
NHL totals			754	49	189	238	1552	86	4	24	28	219

=== International ===
Year	Team	Event	GP	G	A	Pts	PIM
1976	United States	CC	5	1	3	4	16

== NHL coaching record ==
Team	Year	Regular season						Post season
Team	Year	G	W	L	T	Pts	Division rank	Result
BOS	1989–90	80	46	25	9	101	1st in Adams	Lost in Stanley Cup Finals
BOS	1990–91	80	44	24	12	100	1st in Adams	Lost in Conference Finals
NYI	1995–96	82	22	50	10	54	7th in Atlantic	Missed Playoffs
NYI	1996–97	45	13	23	9	(70)	7th in Atlantic	(Moved to GM's Role)
NYI	1997–98	19	8	9	2	(71)	4th in Atlantic	Missed Playoffs
NYI	1998–99	45	13	29	3	(58)	5th in Atlantic	(Returned to GM's role)
Total		351	146	160	45			

Preceded by Terry O'Reilly	Head coach of the Boston Bruins; 1989–91	Succeeded by Rick Bowness
Preceded by Lorne Henning	Head coach of the New York Islanders; 1995–97	Succeeded by Rick Bowness
Preceded by Rick Bowness	Head coach of the New York Islanders; 1998	Succeeded by Bill Stewart
Preceded by Darcy Regier	General Manager of the New York Islanders; 1995–2006	Succeeded by Neil Smith
