= Don Marcotte =

Canadian ice hockey player

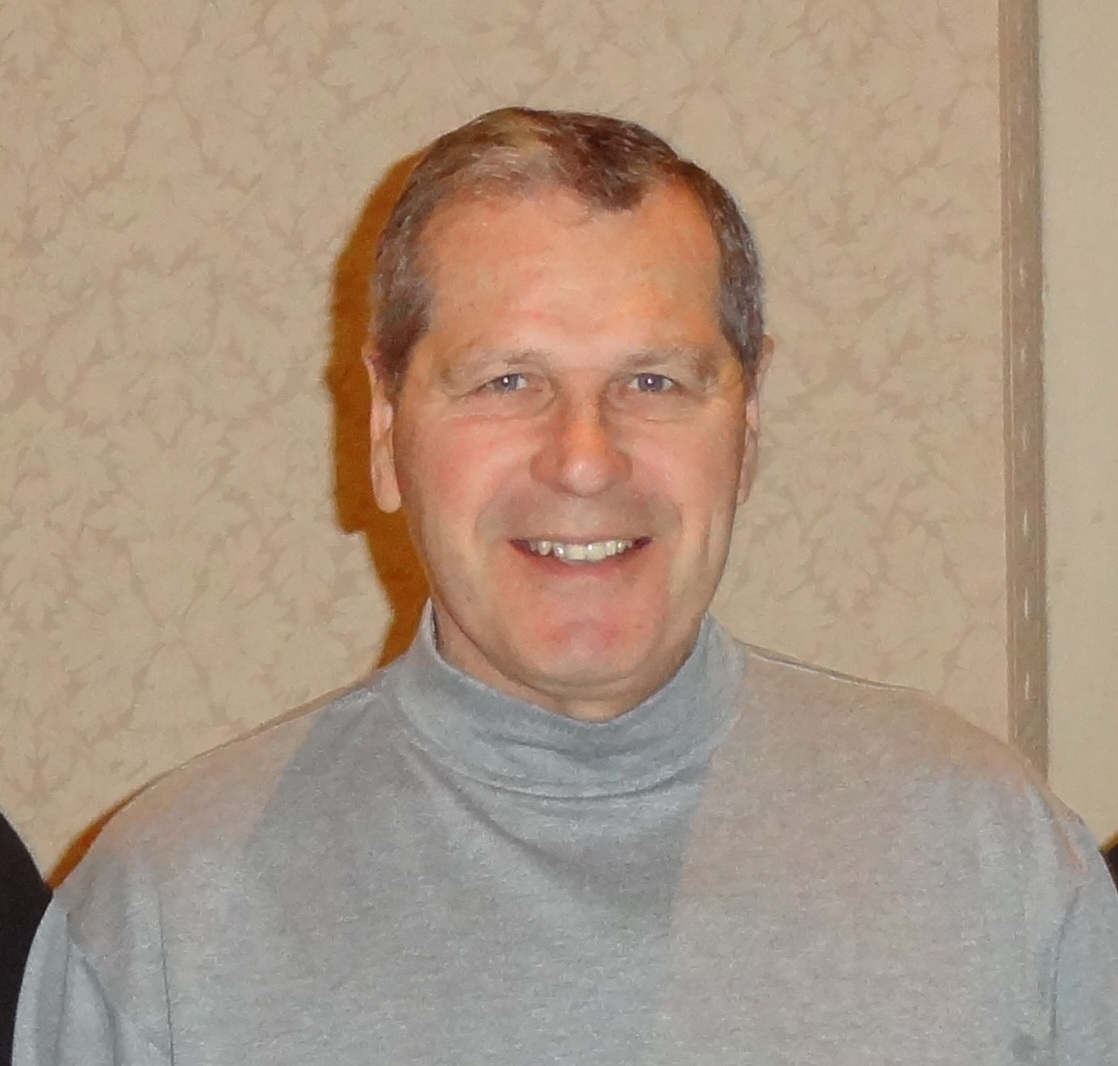
- Marcotte in 2012
- Born: April 15, 1947 (age 79) Arthabaska, Quebec, Canada
- Height: 5 ft 11 in (180 cm)
- Weight: 183 lb (83 kg; 13 st 1 lb)
- Position: Left wing
- Shot: Left
- Played for: Boston Bruins
- Playing career: 1967–1982

Donald Michel Marcotte (born April 15, 1947) is a Canadian former professional ice hockey player who served his entire National Hockey League career with the Boston Bruins and was noted as a premier defensive forward, while being versatile enough to play any forward position.

== Early life/career ==
Marcotte was born in Arthabaska, Quebec. His family were longtime residents of the area. At the age of three, Don first laced up his first pair of skates and by the age of six was enrolled in youth hockey in his community. In 1963, at the age of 16, Marcotte left the local youth programs for the Victoriaville Bruins of the QPJHL. After one season with Victoriaville the Boston Bruins signed him to continue his development with the B’s Junior “A” affiliate in Ontario, the Niagara Falls Flyers. He played junior league hockey for the Flyers in 1965, 1966, and 1967.

During the 1964-65 OHA season, Marcotte appeared in 56 games, tallying 51 points. In the postseason, he appeared in 24 games, scoring 16 goals and 11 assists, helping the team win the J. Ross Robertson Cup, George Richardson Memorial Trophy and Memorial Cup.

He made his NHL debut during the 1965-66 season appearing in one game for the Bruins, then making a handful of appearances for the CPHL Blazers and helping them win the league title. Marcotte then left the OHA for good after the 1966-67 season to join the Boston Bruins American Hockey League team in Hershey.

== Career ==
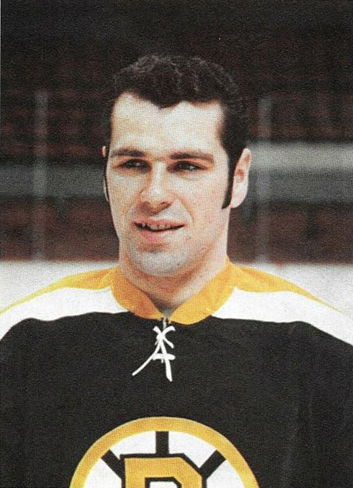
1970 photo of Marcotte for Boston Bruins

Marcotte turned fully professional in the 1968 season with the Hershey Bears of the American Hockey League helping lead them to the Calder cup in 1969. After three starring seasons for the Bears, Marcotte was recalled by the Boston Bruins for the 1970 season

Marcotte became a defensive mainstay on Boston's checking line with Derek Sanderson and Ed Westfall. Marcotte scored his first NHL goal in a 3–1 Boston loss to the Montreal Canadiens on February 15, 1969, at the Montreal Forum. During the season, Marcotte scored the first of four career hat-tricks on February 8, 1970, in a 7-1 win over the St. Louis Blues. With Boston, Marcotte reached the 1970 Stanley Cup Final where they ended their 29-year drought to win the championship.

He was capable of playing multiple forward positions along with being a forechecker for most of his career. Being a two-way defensive forward, he became noteworthy for his defense and penalty-killing, with a great ability to disrupt plays and win puck battles. Marcotte was assigned to shadow superstar wingers like the Chicago Black Hawks' Bobby Hull (the "Golden Jet") and Montreal Canadiens' Guy Lafleur (the "Flower"); Lafleur in turn "considered Marcotte the toughest checker he ever faced" after the 1979 Stanley Cup playoffs. Described by teammate Terry O'Reilly, Marcotte was said to have "tremendous concentration. He never takes his eyes off of his winger and he never stops skating. What he lacks in speed and finesse he compensates for with hustle and disciplined play. He is a hard body checker who believes in playing the man before the puck, yet as the small number of minutes he spends in the penalty box indicate, he is not a dirty player".

Marcotte played twelve more seasons in Boston. He remained a key contributor to Boston's Stanley Cup win in 1972. He also played in three more Stanley Cup Finals with Boston, in 1974, 1977, and 1978. In both the 1977–78 and 1978-79 seasons, Marcotte finished in the top three of voting for the Frank J. Selke Trophy for best defensive forward. During the 1978–79 NHL season, Marcotte was honoured when he was selected for the NHL All-Stars team for the 1979 Challenge Cup.

In his later years as a Bruin, Marcotte mentored Steve Kasper into a premier defensive forward. After being released in training camp by the Bruins in the fall of 1982, Marcotte retired from hockey.

He had played in 868 games, scoring 230 goals and 254 assists for 484 points, and adding 317 penalty minutes. He scored 20 or more goals in the regular season seven times throughout his career. His best statistical season coming during the 1974–75 season having 64 point season with 31 goals and 33 assists. As a testament to his defensive prowess, Marcotte led the NHL in shorthanded goals in 1971 with six, and his 21 shorthanded goals in the regular season rank him fourth in Bruins' history behind only Brad Marchand, Rick Middleton, and Derek Sanderson.

Marcotte loved his time playing for the Bruins. In reference to the glory years, he stated, “It was a good bunch of guys and we had a lot of good times together. When it came time to play hockey the guys were all business and wanted to win. It was a great time.”

In 2023, he was named one of the top 100 best Bruins players of all time.

== Personal life ==
Marcotte is married to his wife Helen, and they reside in Amesbury. The two have two daughters and one son. Even after retirement he has stayed a part of the Bruins organization, once serving as the manager of the Boston Garden Club at the TD Banknorth Garden. He is also a part of the alumni organization.

Marcotte's grandchildren Trey and Bodie have also developed into successful hockey players. Both have served as captains of the Amesbury high school hockey team, and Bodie was selected to the NCDC entry draft in 2025.

== Awards and achievements ==
- Stanley Cup Championships (1970, 1972)
- Seventh Player Award — 1974
- 1979 NHL All star
- Memorial Cup (1965)
- Adam’s cup (1966)
- Calder cup (1969)
- Named One of the Top 100 Best Bruins Players of all Time

== Career statistics ==
			Regular season					Playoffs
Season	Team	League	GP	G	A	Pts	PIM	GP	G	A	Pts	PIM
1963–64	Victoriaville Bruins	QJHL	—	—	—	—	—	9	14	2	16	33
1964–65	Niagara Falls Flyers	OHA-Jr.	56	28	23	51	94	11	7	5	12	30
1964–65	Niagara Falls Flyers	M-Cup	—	—	—	—	—	13	9	6	15	22
1965–66	Niagara Falls Flyers	OHA-Jr.	45	28	22	50	76	6	3	3	6	11
1965–66	Boston Bruins	NHL	1	0	0	0	0	—	—	—	—	—
1965–66	Oklahoma City Blazers	CPHL	2	1	0	1	2	5	2	0	2	0
1966–67	Niagara Falls Flyers	OHA-Jr.	35	21	21	42	38	13	8	8	16	28
1967–68	Hershey Bears	AHL	72	31	22	53	35	5	0	1	1	16
1968–69	Boston Bruins	NHL	7	1	0	1	2	—	—	—	—	—
1968–69	Hershey Bears	AHL	67	35	21	56	65	11	7	2	9	25
1969–70	Boston Bruins	NHL	35	9	3	12	14	14	2	0	2	11
1969–70	Hershey Bears	AHL	35	28	15	43	23	—	—	—	—	—
1970–71	Boston Bruins	NHL	75	15	13	28	30	4	0	0	0	0
1971–72	Boston Bruins	NHL	47	6	4	10	12	14	3	0	3	6
1971–72	Boston Braves	AHL	8	4	7	11	2	—	—	—	—	—
1972–73	Boston Bruins	NHL	78	24	31	55	49	5	1	1	2	0
1973–74	Boston Bruins	NHL	78	24	26	50	18	16	4	2	6	8
1974–75	Boston Bruins	NHL	80	31	33	64	76	3	1	0	1	0
1975–76	Boston Bruins	NHL	58	16	20	36	24	12	4	2	6	8
1976–77	Boston Bruins	NHL	80	27	18	45	20	14	5	6	11	10
1977–78	Boston Bruins	NHL	77	20	34	54	16	15	5	4	9	8
1978–79	Boston Bruins	NHL	79	20	27	47	10	11	5	3	8	10
1979–80	Boston Bruins	NHL	32	4	11	15	0	10	2	3	5	4
1980–81	Boston Bruins	NHL	72	20	13	33	32	3	2	2	4	6
1981–82	Boston Bruins	NHL	69	13	21	34	14	11	0	4	4	10
NHL totals			868	230	254	484	317	132	34	27	61	81
