= 1978 in ice hockey =

The following is a chronicle of events during the year 1978 in ice hockey.

== National Hockey League ==
- Art Ross Trophy as the NHL's leading scorer during the regular season: Guy Lafleur
- Hart Memorial Trophy: for the NHL's Most Valuable Player: Guy Lafleur
- Stanley Cup - 1978 Stanley Cup Finals: the Montreal Canadiens defeat the Boston Bruins
- With the first overall pick in the 1978 NHL Amateur Draft, the Minnesota North Stars selected Bobby Smith

== World Hockey Association ==
*the Winnipeg Jets won the Account World Trophy

== Canadian Hockey League ==
- Ontario Hockey League: J. Ross Robertson Cup.
- Quebec Major Junior Hockey League: won President's Cup (QMJHL) for the first time in team history
- Western Hockey League: President's Cup (WHL) for the first time in team history
- Memorial Cup:

== Minor League hockey ==
- AHL: Calder Cup
- IHL: Turner Cup.
- Allan Cup:

== University hockey ==
NCAA Division I Men's Ice Hockey Tournament

== Season articles ==
1972–73 NHL season	1978–79 NHL season
1972–73 AHL season	1978–79 AHL season

== See also ==
- 1978 in sports
