= John Wensink =

Canadian ice hockey player

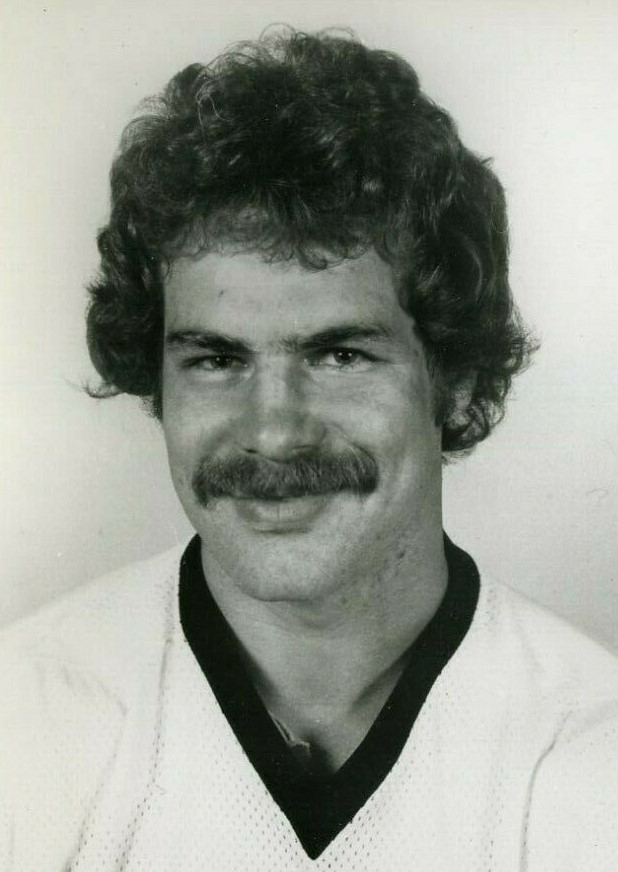
- Born: April 1, 1953 (age 73) Pincher Creek, Alberta, Canada
- Height: 5 ft 10 in (178 cm)
- Weight: 198 lb (90 kg; 14 st 2 lb)
- Position: Left wing
- Shot: Left
- Played for: St. Louis Blues; Boston Bruins; Quebec Nordiques; Colorado Rockies; New Jersey Devils
- National team: Netherlands
- NHL draft: 104th overall, 1973; St. Louis Blues
- WHA draft: 28th overall, 1973; New York Golden Blades
- Playing career: 1973–1983

John Wensink (born April 1, 1953) is a Dutch Canadian former professional ice hockey player who played over 400 games in the National Hockey League (NHL), most prominently with the Boston Bruins. Wensink played in back-to-back Stanley Cup Finals with the Bruins in 1977 and 1978.

Wensink grew up in Maxville, Ontario, the son of Dutch immigrants, and played for the Netherlands national team in the 1989 World Championships.

== Career ==
Wensink is best remembered for his time with the Boston Bruins, where he teamed with Terry O'Reilly and Stan Jonathan as the team's enforcers. On December 1, 1977, Wensink, after fighting Alex Pirus of the Minnesota North Stars, skated to the Minnesota bench and challenged the entire team, but no player responded. Wensink is also well known for the large afro that he sported on the ice. In another scrap with Bob Kelly, Wensink and Kelly were pulling at each other's hair.

Besides his skill as a fighter, Wensink could score as well. He had a career high 46 points in the 1978–79 season for the Bruins.

Wensink also played for the St. Louis Blues, Quebec Nordiques, the Colorado Rockies and the New Jersey Devils. He finished his career with the Nijmegen Tigers in the Dutch Eredivisie in 1984–85.

== Post-playing career ==
After his playing career ended, Wensink moved to St. Charles, Missouri, and started a home renovation company, where he also plays senior hockey. Wensink has been active as a pee-wee hockey coach. He is still active with the St. Louis Blues Alumni and the Boston Bruins Alumni hockey teams.

In 2023 he would be named one of the top 100 Bruins players of all time.

== Career statistics ==
=== Regular season and playoffs ===
			Regular season					Playoffs
Season	Team	League	GP	G	A	Pts	PIM	GP	G	A	Pts	PIM
1970–71	Cornwall Royals	QMJHL	57	11	6	17	151	—	—	—	—	—
1971–72	Cornwall Royals	QMJHL	60	10	22	32	169	15	2	2	4	64
1972–73	Cornwall Royals	QMJHL	52	9	26	35	242	16	1	6	7	55
1973–74	St. Louis Blues	NHL	3	0	0	0	0	—	—	—	—	—
1973–74	Rochester Americans	AHL	36	6	2	8	139	5	0	0	0	29
1974–75	Denver Spurs	CHL	21	3	8	11	75	—	—	—	—	—
1976–77	Boston Bruins	NHL	23	4	6	10	32	13	0	3	3	8
1977–78	Boston Bruins	NHL	80	16	20	36	181	15	2	2	4	54
1978–79	Boston Bruins	NHL	76	28	18	46	108	8	0	1	1	19
1979–80	Boston Bruins	NHL	69	9	11	20	110	4	0	0	0	5
1980–81	Quebec Nordiques	NHL	53	6	3	9	124	3	0	0	0	0
1981–82	Colorado Rockies	NHL	57	5	3	8	152	—	—	—	—	—
1982–83	New Jersey Devils	NHL	42	2	7	9	135	—	—	—	—	—
1982–83	Wichita Wind	CHL	7	1	0	1	36	—	—	—	—	—
1984–85	Vissers Nijmegen	NED	14	15	12	27	39	—	—	—	—	—
NHL totals			403	70	68	138	842	43	2	6	8	86

=== International ===
Year	Team	Event	GP	G	A	Pts	PIM
1989	Netherlands	WC-C	7	3	5	8	10
Senior totals			7	3	5	8	10
