= Gilles Lupien =

Canadian ice hockey player (1954–2021)

- Born: April 20, 1954 Brownsburg-Chatham, Quebec, Canada
- Died: May 18, 2021 (aged 67) Montreal, Quebec, Canada
- Height: 6 ft 6 in (198 cm)
- Weight: 210 lb (95 kg; 15 st 0 lb)
- Position: Defence
- Shot: Left
- Played for: Montreal Canadiens; Pittsburgh Penguins; Hartford Whalers
- NHL draft: 33rd overall, 1974; Montreal Canadiens
- WHA draft: 71st overall, 1974; Toronto Toros
- Playing career: 1971–1982

Joseph Leonard Gilles Lupien (April 20, 1954 – May 18, 2021) was a Canadian professional ice hockey defenceman who played five seasons in the National Hockey League (NHL). He played for the Montreal Canadiens, Pittsburgh Penguins, and Hartford Whalers from 1977 to 1982. After retiring, he became a sports agent, businessman, and was an owner of the Longueuil Chevaliers and the Victoriaville Tigres.

Lupien played three seasons of junior hockey in the Quebec Major Junior Hockey League. He was drafted by the Montreal Canadiens in 1974 and played for their minor league affiliate until 1977, when he made his NHL debut. After spending three seasons with the organization and being part of their Stanley Cup-winning teams in 1978 and 1979, he was traded to Pittsburgh Penguins before the 1980–81 season. He was then dealt to the Hartford Whalers, before serving as player–assistant of the Binghamton Whalers and retiring at the end of the 1981–82 season.

== Early life ==
Lupien was born on April 20, 1954, in Brownsburg-Chatham, near Lachute, Quebec. He played for the Quebec Remparts, Sherbrooke Castors, and Montreal Bleu Blanc Rouge of the Quebec Major Junior Hockey League (QMJHL) from 1971 to 1974.

== Career ==
Lupien was drafted by the Montreal Canadiens in the second round (33rd overall selection) of the 1974 NHL Amateur Draft. He played for the Nova Scotia Voyageurs, their minor league affiliate that were members of the American Hockey League (AHL), and was part of their Calder Cup-winning teams in 1976 and 1977. He played for the Voyageurs until 1977–78, when he made his NHL debut. At 6 feet 6 inches (1.98 m) tall, he was brought in as the on-ice bodyguard of Guy Lafleur and an enforcer. He finished his debut season with 4 points in 46 games. His playing time in the NHL increased to 72 games during his sophomore season, in which he amassed a career-high 10 points (with 9 assists), a career-best plus–minus rating of 31, and finished eighth in the league in defensive point shares (5.6). Lupien also played in eight and 13 playoff games, respectively, en-route to the Canadiens' 1978 and 1979 Stanley Cup championships. In his final season with the Canadiens in 1979–80, he recorded eight points in 56 games, while leading the franchise in penalty minutes with 117. He was subsequently traded to the Pittsburgh Penguins on September 26, 1980, for their third round selection of the 1983 NHL entry draft.

During the first half of the 1980–81 season, Lupien had just one assist in 31 games played, with a plus–minus rating of −15. He was traded mid-season to the Hartford Whalers on February 20, 1981. He played 20 games for the franchise that year (contributing two goals and four assists), before playing only one game the following year, in what turned out to be his final season in the NHL. He subsequently acted as player–assistant of the Binghamton Whalers in the AHL, recording 20 points in 53 games, before retiring at the end of 1981–82.

== Post-playing career ==
Becoming a professional hockey agent after retirement from playing, Lupien represented Martin Brodeur and Roberto Luongo, acting as the latter's agent for 19 years. He was also the agent of Steve Bernier, Corey Crawford, and Sean Couturier. Lupien was the agent for an unnamed player from the Drummondville Voltigeurs who contacted him regarding sexual advances by the team's coach Jean Bégin. Lupien later reported the incidents to the QMJHL, but the matter was disregarded as the league said there was no proof of misconduct. Bégin was later convicted.

As an agent, Lupien was a vocal proponent of improving the working conditions of players in junior ice hockey. He advocated the unionization of the Canadian Hockey League, and was of the opinion that it could assist in diminishing fighting at the amateur level and result in better treatment of players by their teams. In supporting the elimination of violence in hockey on all levels, he recommended that coaches be sanctioned for any fights their players are involved in. Lupien also called for decreasing the number of games in a season and cutting down travel time, believing that the taxing schedule was responsible for the mounting drug usage among junior players. He alleged in December 2003 that approximately half of the players in the QMJHL used drugs, either for recreational purposes, to enhance their performance, or to sleep on long bus journeys.

Lupien also worked as a businessman in the fast-food industry, initially purchasing a Humpty Dumpty Snack Foods before acquiring a Boston Pizza franchise in West Island. He was also an owner of the Longueuil Chevaliers and the Victoriaville Tigres. The hockey arena in his hometown of Brownsburg-Chatham was named the Gilles Lupien Arena in his honour in 1985.

== Personal life ==
Lupien had three children: Jennifer, Catherine, and Erik. He utilized the C$75,000 signing bonus from his first contract with the Canadiens to purchase shares in a lumber company in Lachute.

Lupien died on May 18, 2021. He was 67, and suffered from cancer prior to his death.

== Career statistics ==
=== Regular season and playoffs ===
| | | | Regular season | | | | | Playoffs |
| Season | Team | League | GP | G | A | Pts | PIM | GP | G | A | Pts | PIM |
|---|---|---|---|---|---|---|---|---|---|---|---|---|
| 1971–72 | Quebec Remparts | QMJHL | 36 | 0 | 5 | 5 | 54 | 15 | 0 | 3 | 3 | 17 |
| 1972–73 | Sherbrooke Castors | QMJHL | 26 | 0 | 5 | 5 | 71 | — | — | — | — | — |
| 1972–73 | Montreal Red White and Blue | QMJHL | 26 | 4 | 4 | 8 | 66 | 4 | 0 | 0 | 0 | 0 |
| 1973–74 | Montreal Red White and Blue | QMJHL | 44 | 3 | 29 | 32 | 268 | 9 | 0 | 3 | 3 | 28 |
| 1974–75 | Nova Scotia Voyageurs | AHL | 73 | 6 | 9 | 15 | 316 | 6 | 0 | 0 | 0 | 61 |
| 1975–76 | Nova Scotia Voyageurs | AHL | 56 | 2 | 6 | 8 | 134 | 9 | 0 | 4 | 4 | 29 |
| 1976–77 | Nova Scotia Voyageurs | AHL | 69 | 6 | 16 | 22 | 215 | 12 | 0 | 2 | 2 | 35 |
| 1977–78 | Nova Scotia Voyageurs | AHL | 7 | 1 | 2 | 3 | 10 | — | — | — | — | — |
| 1977–78 | Montreal Canadiens | NHL | 46 | 1 | 3 | 4 | 108 | 8 | 0 | 0 | 0 | 17 |
| 1978–79 | Montreal Canadiens | NHL | 72 | 1 | 9 | 10 | 124 | 13 | 0 | 0 | 0 | 2 |
| 1979–80 | Montreal Canadiens | NHL | 56 | 1 | 7 | 8 | 109 | 4 | 0 | 0 | 0 | 2 |
| 1980–81 | Pittsburgh Penguins | NHL | 31 | 0 | 1 | 1 | 34 | — | — | — | — | — |
| 1980–81 | Binghamton Whalers | AHL | 11 | 1 | 4 | 5 | 71 | — | — | — | — | — |
| 1980–81 | Hartford Whalers | NHL | 20 | 2 | 4 | 6 | 39 | — | — | — | — | — |
| 1981–82 | Binghamton Whalers | AHL | 53 | 8 | 12 | 20 | 280 | 13 | 2 | 5 | 7 | 58 |
| 1981–82 | Hartford Whalers | NHL | 1 | 0 | 1 | 1 | 2 | — | — | — | — | — |
| AHL totals | | | 269 | 24 | 49 | 73 | 1026 | 40 | 2 | 11 | 13 | 183 |
| NHL totals | | | 226 | 5 | 25 | 30 | 416 | 25 | 0 | 0 | 0 | 21 |
