= Pierre Bouchard =

Canadian ice hockey player (born 1948)

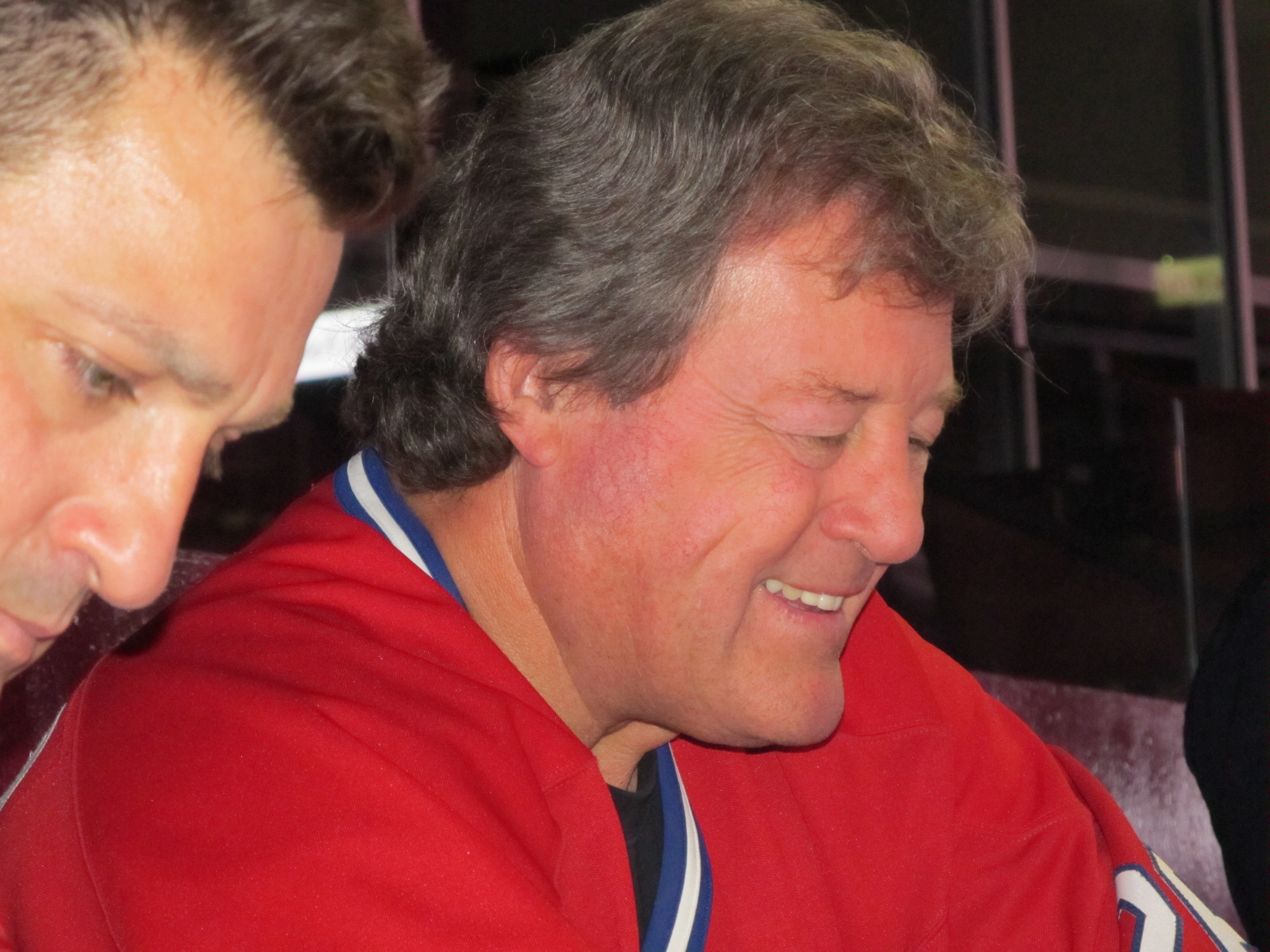
- Born: February 20, 1948 (age 78) Longueuil, Quebec, Canada
- Height: 6 ft 2 in (188 cm)
- Weight: 205 lb (93 kg; 14 st 9 lb)
- Position: Defence
- Shot: Left
- Played for: Montreal Canadiens; Washington Capitals
- NHL draft: 5th overall, 1965; Montreal Canadiens
- Playing career: 1970–1982

Pierre Émile Bouchard (born February 20, 1948) is a Canadian former professional ice hockey player who played in the National Hockey League (NHL) with the Montreal Canadiens and Washington Capitals. He was selected by the Canadiens in the first round (fifth overall) of the 1965 NHL Amateur Draft.

During the 1970s, Bouchard and Bill Nyrop were defensive-minded defencemen complementing the Canadiens’ offensive trio of Larry Robinson, Serge Savard, and Guy Lapointe.

Bouchard's NHL career began after the Montreal Canadiens had missed the playoffs in the 1969–70 season, a team which had not missed post-season play in 22 years, and among the changes that were made were to bring Bouchard along with Guy Lapointe up from the minors. In his rookie year in 1970–71, Bouchard was part of the Canadiens' team that beat the Boston Bruins in the first round and went on to win the Stanley Cup. Bouchard played for five Stanley Cup-winning Canadiens teams in eight seasons.

In game four of the 1978 Stanley Cup Final, Bouchard challenged the Bruins' Stan Jonathan to a fight; Jonathan broke Bouchard's nose and cheekbone and knocked him to the ice.

Prior to the 1978–79 season, a failed manipulation of the waiver system by the Canadiens led Bouchard's rights to unintentionally move from Montreal to Washington. Montreal had intended to reclaim him, but NHL President John Ziegler rejected the deal citing league bylaws which the Board of Governors refused to change. Bouchard believed the Canadiens never intended to get him back. Initially unhappy with the move, Bouchard played only one game in the 1978–79 season and considered retirement. However, he returned next season to the NHL with Washington where he finished his career playing four seasons.

His father was Canadiens' Hall of Fame defenceman of the 1940s and 1950s Émile "Butch" Bouchard. Henri Richard had played with Butch Bouchard in the 1955–56 season, and Pierre Bouchard from 1970-1975, creating the unusual occurrence of a player having been teammates with both father and son in the NHL.

After retirement Bouchard went into business and broadcasting. He became one of the most popular francophone analysts for the NHL.

== Career statistics ==
			Regular season					Playoffs
Season	Team	League	GP	G	A	Pts	PIM	GP	G	A	Pts	PIM
1965–66	Montreal Nationale	MMJHL	40	6	19	25	53	—	—	—	—	—
1966–67	Montreal Junior Canadiens	OHA-Jr.	48	4	9	13	105	6	0	0	0	2
1967–68	Montreal Junior Canadiens	OHA-Jr.	54	10	18	28	134	11	2	2	4	20
1968–69	Cleveland Barons	AHL	69	6	16	22	32	5	1	1	2	14
1969–70	Montreal Voyageurs	AHL	65	5	13	18	124	8	1	3	4	24
1970–71	Montreal Canadiens	NHL	51	0	3	3	50	13	0	1	1	10
1971–72	Montreal Canadiens	NHL	60	3	5	8	39	1	0	0	0	0
1972–73	Montreal Canadiens	NHL	41	0	7	7	69	17	1	3	4	13
1973–74	Montreal Canadiens	NHL	60	1	14	15	25	6	0	2	2	4
1974–75	Montreal Canadiens	NHL	79	3	9	12	65	10	0	2	2	10
1975–76	Montreal Canadiens	NHL	66	1	11	12	50	13	2	0	2	8
1976–77	Montreal Canadiens	NHL	73	4	11	15	52	6	0	1	1	6
1977–78	Montreal Canadiens	NHL	59	4	6	10	29	10	0	1	1	5
1978–79	Washington Capitals	NHL	1	0	0	0	0	—	—	—	—	—
1979–80	Washington Capitals	NHL	54	5	9	14	16	—	—	—	—	—
1980–81	Washington Capitals	NHL	50	3	7	10	28	—	—	—	—	—
1981–82	Hershey Bears	AHL	62	2	10	12	26	5	0	0	0	6
1981–82	Washington Capitals	NHL	1	0	0	0	10	—	—	—	—	—
NHL totals			595	24	82	106	433	76	3	10	13	56

Preceded by Claude Chagnon	Montreal Canadiens first-round draft pick 1965	Succeeded by Phil Myre
