= Dennis O'Brien (ice hockey) =

Canadian ice hockey player

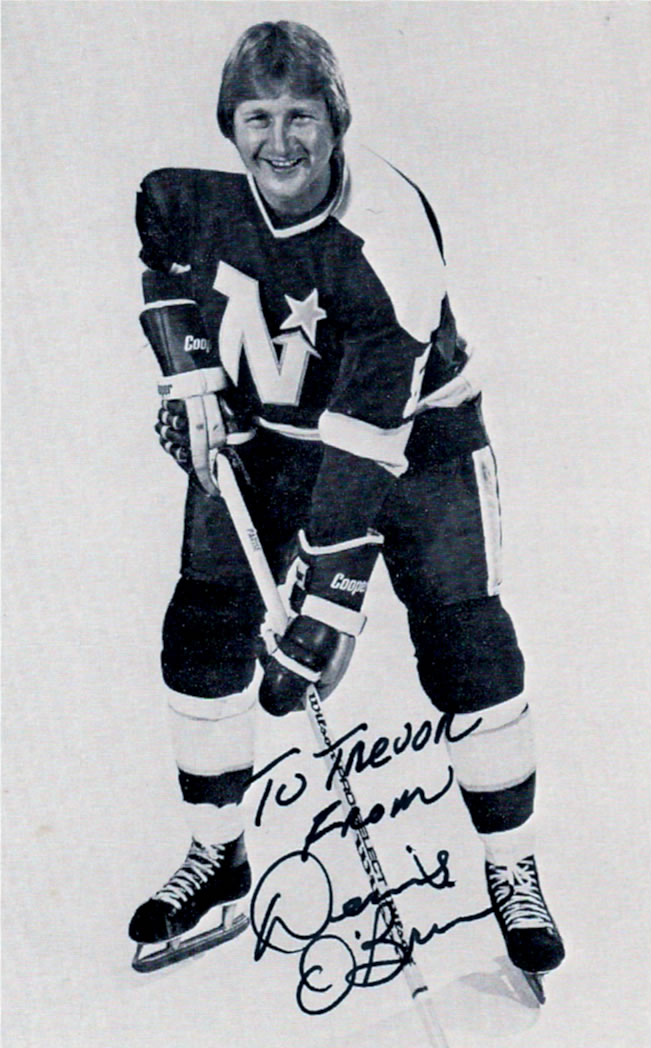
- Born: June 10, 1949 (age 76) Port Hope, Ontario, Canada
- Height: 6 ft 0 in (183 cm)
- Weight: 195 lb (88 kg; 13 st 13 lb)
- Position: Defence
- Shot: Left
- Played for: Minnesota North Stars; Colorado Rockies; Cleveland Barons; Boston Bruins
- NHL draft: 14th overall, 1969; Minnesota North Stars
- Playing career: 1969–1980

Dennis Francis O'Brien (born 10 June 1949) is a Canadian former professional ice hockey defenceman who played in the National Hockey League (NHL). He featured in the 1978 Stanley Cup Finals with the Boston Bruins.

O'Brien is the uncle of former NHL player Shane O'Brien.

== Playing career ==
O'Brien was selected by the Minnesota North Stars in the second round, 14th overall, of the 1969 NHL Amateur Draft, and played for the North Stars for the majority of his career, from 1970–71 to 1977–78. During his final season with the North Stars, he played just 13 games before being traded to the Colorado Rockies. After 16 games with the Rockies, he was traded to the Cleveland Barons and after 23 games as a Baron, he was traded to his fourth team of the season, the Boston Bruins, where he played 16 games. The final trade to the Bruins broke an NHL record for the most teams played for in one season. That record has since been equalled by Dave McLlwain in 1991–92, Mark Arcobello in 2014–15 and Jussi Jokinen in 2017–18.

After that busy season, O'Brien played parts of two more seasons in the NHL, both for the Bruins.

== Career statistics ==
			Regular season					Playoffs
Season	Team	League	GP	G	A	Pts	PIM	GP	G	A	Pts	PIM
1968–69	St. Catharines Black Hawks	OHA	52	1	19	20	235	—	—	—	—	—
1969–70	Iowa Stars	CHL	72	2	18	20	331	11	0	2	2	30
1970–71	Cleveland Barons	AHL	27	1	6	7	100	—	—	—	—	—
1970–71	Minnesota North Stars	NHL	27	3	2	5	29	9	0	0	0	20
1971–72	Minnesota North Stars	NHL	70	3	6	9	108	3	0	1	1	11
1972–73	Minnesota North Stars	NHL	74	3	11	14	75	6	1	0	1	38
1973–74	Minnesota North Stars	NHL	77	5	12	17	166	—	—	—	—	—
1974–75	Minnesota North Stars	NHL	56	6	10	16	125	—	—	—	—	—
1975–76	Minnesota North Stars	NHL	78	1	14	15	187	—	—	—	—	—
1976–77	Minnesota North Stars	NHL	75	6	18	24	114	2	0	0	0	4
1977–78	Minnesota North Stars	NHL	13	0	2	2	32	—	—	—	—	—
1977–78	Colorado Rockies	NHL	16	0	2	2	12	—	—	—	—	—
1977–78	Cleveland Barons	NHL	23	0	3	3	31	—	—	—	—	—
1977–78	Boston Bruins	NHL	16	2	3	5	29	14	0	1	1	28
1978–79	Boston Bruins	NHL	64	2	8	10	107	—	—	—	—	—
1978–79	Rochester Americans	AHL	2	0	0	0	2	—	—	—	—	—
1979–80	Boston Bruins	NHL	3	0	0	0	2	—	—	—	—	—
1979–80	Binghamton Dusters	AHL	6	2	5	7	65	—	—	—	—	—
NHL totals			592	31	91	122	1017	34	1	2	3	101

== See also ==
List of family relations in the NHL
