= 1978 Stanley Cup Final =

1978 ice hockey championship series

	1	2	3	4	5	6	Total
Montreal Canadiens	4	3*	0	3*	4	4	4
Boston Bruins	1	2*	4	4*	1	1	2
- * – Denotes overtime period(s)
- Location(s): Montreal: Montreal Forum (1, 2, 5); Boston: Boston Garden (3, 4, 6)
- Coaches: Montreal: Scotty Bowman; Boston: Don Cherry
- Captains: Montreal: Yvan Cournoyer; Boston: Wayne Cashman
- Dates: May 13–25, 1978
- MVP: Larry Robinson (Canadiens)
- Series-winning goal: Mario Tremblay (9:20, first)
- Hall of Famers: Canadiens: Yvan Cournoyer (1982); Ken Dryden (1983); Bob Gainey (1992); Guy Lafleur (1988); Guy Lapointe (1993); Jacques Lemaire (1984); Larry Robinson (1995); Serge Savard (1986); Steve Shutt (1993); Bruins: Johnny Bucyk (1981; did not play); Gerry Cheevers (1985); Brad Park (1988); Jean Ratelle (1985); Coaches: Scotty Bowman (1991); Officials: John D'Amico (1993); Matt Pavelich (1987); Andy Van Hellemond (1999)
- Networks: Canada: (English): CBC (French): SRC; United States: (English): NHL Network (national), WSBK-TV (Boston)
- Announcers: (CBC) Danny Gallivan (1–2, 5), Dan Kelly (3–4, 6), Chico Resch, and Dick Irvin Jr. (SRC) Rene Lecavalier and Gilles Tremblay (NHLN) Simulcast of CBC feed (WSBK) Fred Cusick and Johnny Peirson

The 1978 Stanley Cup Final was the championship series of the National Hockey League's (NHL) 1977–78 season, and the culmination of the 1978 Stanley Cup playoffs. It was contested between the Boston Bruins and the defending champion Montreal Canadiens, making their third straight appearance in the Finals. The series was a rematch of the 1977 Stanley Cup Final. The Canadiens won the best-of-seven series, four games to two, to win their third consecutive Stanley Cup championship and their 21st overall. This was the last time that both the Boston Bruins and Montreal Canadiens met in the Stanley Cup Final. The Canadiens eventually joined the Bruins in the Adams Division (now the Atlantic Division) in 1982, rendering a rematch impossible.

== Paths to the Finals ==
Montreal defeated the Detroit Red Wings 4–1 and the Toronto Maple Leafs 4–0 to advance to the final.

Boston defeated the Chicago Black Hawks 4–0 and the Philadelphia Flyers 4–1 to make it to the final.

== Game summaries ==
Defenceman Larry Robinson of Montreal led all players with 17 assists, and finished tied with teammate Guy Lafleur with 21 points, to win the Conn Smythe Trophy.

=== Game one ===
May 13	Boston Bruins	1–4	Montreal Canadiens	Montreal Forum	Recap

Scoring summary
Period	Team	Goal	Assist(s)	Time	Score
1st	BOS	Brad Park (6) – pp	Bobby Schmautz (14) and Jean Ratelle (5)	02:31	1–0 BOS
1st	MTL	Guy Lafleur (8) – pp	Guy Lapointe (5)	04:31	1–1
1st	MTL	Yvon Lambert (2) – pp	Guy Lafleur (10) and Steve Shutt (8)	09:53	2–1 MTL
2nd	MTL	Steve Shutt (7)	Jacques Lemaire (7) and Guy Lafleur (11)	13:54	3–1 MTL
3rd	MTL	Yvan Cournoyer (7)	Doug Jarvis (3) and Yvon Lambert (3)	13:54	4–1 MTL
Penalty summary
Period	Team	Player	Penalty	Time	PIM
1st	MTL	Pierre Mondou	Tripping	00:38	2:00
1st	BOS	Rick Smith	Holding	04:26	2:00
1st	MTL	Bill Nyrop	Holding	06:27	2:00
1st	BOS	Rick Smith	Slashing	09:21	2:00
1st	BOS	Bench (served by Wayne Cashman)	Delay of game	09:53	2:00
1st	MTL	Serge Savard	Interference	13:05	2:00
1st	BOS	Rick Smith	Hooking	15:16	2:00
2nd	BOS	Brad Park	Elbowing	09:34	2:00
3rd	MTL	Jacques Lemaire	Holding	13:57	2:00
3rd	BOS	Brad Park	Tripping	14:35	2:00

Shots by period
Team	1	2	3	Total
Boston	5	2	9	16
Montreal	12	7	8	27

=== Game two ===
May 16	Boston Bruins	2–3	OT	Montreal Canadiens	Montreal Forum	Recap

Scoring summary
Period	Team	Goal	Assist(s)	Time	Score
1st	None				
2nd	BOS	Brad Park (7)	Terry O'Reilly (9) and Peter McNab (9)	03:57	1–0 BOS
2nd	MTL	Steve Shutt (8)	Larry Robinson (14) and Yvan Cournoyer (3)	07:00	1–1
3rd	MTL	Bob Gainey (2)	Doug Jarvis (4) and Rejean Houle (8)	12:12	2–1 MTL
3rd	BOS	Rick Smith (1)	Wayne Cashman (5) and Peter McNab (10)	15:48	2–2
OT	MTL	Guy Lafleur (9)	Larry Robinson (15)	13:09	3–2 MTL
Penalty summary
Period	Team	Player	Penalty	Time	PIM
1st	MTL	Larry Robinson	Tripping	04:13	2:00
1st	MTL	Rejean Houle	Hooking	06:22	2:00
1st	BOS	Gregg Sheppard	Hooking	09:19	2:00
1st	BOS	John Wensink	Boarding	12:06	2:00
1st	MTL	Bill Nyrop	Holding	18:46	2:00
1st	BOS	Stan Jonathan	High-sticking	19:31	2:00
2nd	MTL	Larry Robinson	Boarding	12:39	2:00
2nd	BOS	Mike Milbury	High-sticking	15:46	2:00
2nd	MTL	Yvan Cournoyer	Slashing	15:46	2:00
3rd	BOS	Dennis O'Brien	Elbowing	05:37	2:00
3rd	MTL	Guy Lafleur	Tripping	15:46	2:00
OT	None				

Shots by period
Team	1	2	3	OT	Total
Boston	8	10	10	4	32
Montreal	8	5	7	15	35

=== Game three ===
May 18	Montreal Canadiens	0–4	Boston Bruins	Boston Garden	Recap

Scoring summary
Period	Team	Goal	Assist(s)	Time	Score
1st	BOS	Gary Doak (1)	Jean Ratelle (6)	00:59	1–0 BOS
1st	BOS	Rick Middleton (5)	Jean Ratelle (7)	05:11	2–0 BOS
2nd	None				
3rd	BOS	Peter McNab (7)	Mike Milbury (6)	02:54	3–0 BOS
3rd	BOS	Terry O'Reilly (5)	Peter McNab (11) and Mike Milbury (7)	15:39	4–0 BOS
Penalty summary
Period	Team	Player	Penalty	Time	PIM
1st	BOS	Bobby Schmautz	High-sticking	08:52	2:00
1st	MTL	Gilles Lupien	High-sticking	08:52	2:00
1st	BOS	Bobby Schmautz	Interference	12:24	2:00
1st	BOS	Stan Jonathan	Holding	19:33	2:00
2nd	BOS	Brad Park	Roughing	07:03	2:00
2nd	MTL	Bob Gainey	Roughing	07:03	2:00
2nd	MTL	Serge Savard	Hooking	08:29	2:00
2nd	MTL	Doug Jarvis	Holding	16:51	2:00
3rd	None				

Shots by period
Team	1	2	3	Total
Montreal	7	5	4	16
Boston	10	13	13	36

=== Game four ===
May 21	Montreal Canadiens	3–4	OT	Boston Bruins	Boston Garden	Recap

Scoring summary
Period	Team	Goal	Assist(s)	Time	Score
1st	BOS	Gregg Sheppard (2)	Don Marcotte (6)	00:25	1–0 BOS
1st	MTL	Doug Risebrough (2)	Mario Tremblay (1) and Bob Gainey (7)	05:11	1–1
2nd	MTL	Larry Robinson (3)	Pierre Mondou (5)	07:00	2–1 MTL
3rd	BOS	Peter McNab (8)	Terry O'Reilly (10) and Wayne Cashman (6)	09:19	2–2
3rd	BOS	Brad Park (8)	Mike Milbury (8) and Gregg Sheppard (8)	13:20	3–2 BOS
3rd	MTL	Guy Lafleur (10)	Guy Lapointe (6) and Jacques Lemaire (8)	19:27	3–3
OT	BOS	Bobby Schmautz (7)	Gregg Sheppard (9) and Brad Park (11)	06:22	4–3 BOS
Penalty summary
Period	Team	Player	Penalty	Time	PIM
1st	BOS	Gary Doak	Interference	01:03	2:00
1st	MTL	Bob Gainey	Charging	01:03	2:00
1st	BOS	Gerry Cheevers	Elbowing	03:38	2:00
1st	MTL	Yvon Lambert	Roughing	03:38	2:00
1st	BOS	Stan Jonathan	Fighting – major	06:28	5:00
1st	BOS	John Wensink	Fighting – major	06:28	5:00
1st	BOS	John Wensink	Gross misconduct	06:28	10:00
1st	MTL	Pierre Bouchard	Fighting – major	06:28	5:00
1st	MTL	Gilles Lupien	Fighting – major	06:28	5:00
1st	MTL	Gilles Lupien	Gross misconduct	06:28	10:00
1st	BOS	Bob Miller	Slashing	08:14	2:00
1st	MTL	Yvan Cournoyer	Slashing	08:14	2:00
1st	MTL	Yvan Cournoyer	Tripping	10:27	2:00
1st	BOS	Terry O'Reilly	Roughing	16:00	2:00
1st	MTL	Mario Tremblay	Roughing	16:00	2:00
2nd	BOS	Gary Doak	Interference	03:23	2:00
2nd	MTL	Bob Gainey	Tripping	07:53	2:00
2nd	MTL	Stan Jonathan	Tripping	15:14	2:00
2nd	MTL	Rejean Houle	Tripping	19:18	2:00
3rd	BOS	Rick Smith	Slashing	06:15	2:00
3rd	MTL	Guy Lafleur	Slashing	06:15	2:00
3rd	BOS	Rick Smith	Roughing	12:37	2:00
3rd	MTL	Pierre Mondou	Roughing	12:37	2:00
OT	None				

Shots by period
Team	1	2	3	OT	Total
Montreal	10	7	7	6	30
Boston	8	5	9	2	24

=== Game five ===
May 23	Boston Bruins	1–4	Montreal Canadiens	Montreal Forum	Recap

Scoring summary
Period	Team	Goal	Assist(s)	Time	Score
1st	MTL	Larry Robinson (4)	Serge Savard (5)	07:46	1–0 MTL
1st	MTL	Pierre Mondou (3) – pp	Serge Savard (6)	11:10	2–0 MTL
2nd	MTL	Pierre Larouche (2) – pp	Yvan Cournoyer (4) and Serge Savard (7)	13:04	3–0 MTL
2nd	MTL	Jacques Lemaire (6)	Bill Nyrop (3)	18:42	4–0 MTL
3rd	BOS	Don Marcotte (5) – pp	Bobby Schmautz (8) and Bob Miller (3)	11:22	4–1 MTL
Penalty summary
Period	Team	Player	Penalty	Time	PIM
1st	BOS	Mike Milbury	High-sticking	02:30	2:00
1st	MTL	Jacques Lemaire	Slashing	02:30	2:00
1st	BOS	Bobby Schmautz	High-sticking	04:02	2:00
1st	MTL	Bob Gainey	High-sticking	04:02	2:00
1st	BOS	Brad Park	High-sticking	07:01	2:00
1st	MTL	Guy Lafleur	Cross-checking	07:01	2:00
1st	BOS	Dennis O'Brien	Holding	09:29	2:00
1st	BOS	Mike Milbury	High-sticking	11:37	2:00
1st	MTL	Guy Lafleur	High-sticking	11:37	2:00
1st	BOS	Don Marcotte	High-sticking	17:13	2:00
1st	MTL	Jacques Lemaire	High-sticking	17:13	2:00
2nd	MTL	Doug Jarvis	Holding	01:34	2:00
2nd	BOS	Terry O'Reilly	Roughing – double minor	04:02	4:00
2nd	BOS	Bobby Schmautz	Fighting – major	04:02	5:00
2nd	MTL	Doug Risebrough	Roughing	04:02	2:00
2nd	MTL	Mario Tremblay	Fighting – major	04:02	5:00
2nd	BOS	Mike Milbury	High-sticking	09:23	2:00
2nd	MTL	Bob Gainey	High-sticking	09:23	2:00
2nd	BOS	Don Marcotte	Hooking	11:07	2:00
2nd	BOS	Stan Jonathan	Roughing	14:02	2:00
2nd	MTL	Steve Shutt	Slashing	14:02	2:00
2nd	BOS	Wayne Cashman	Unsportsmanlike conduct	15:02	2:00
2nd	BOS	Gerry Cheevers	Slashing	17:35	2:00
2nd	MTL	Doug Jarvis	Roughing	17:35	2:00
3rd	BOS	Peter McNab	Hooking	00:27	2:00
3rd	BOS	Terry O'Reilly	Game misconduct	00:27	10:00
3rd	MTL	Mario Tremblay	Hooking	03:55	2:00
3rd	MTL	Doug Jarvis	Hooking	10:04	2:00
3rd	BOS	Bob Miller	Hooking	13:31	2:00
3rd	BOS	Mike Milbury	Slashing	15:00	2:00
3rd	BOS	Stan Jonathan	Fighting – major	19:39	5:00
3rd	BOS	Bob Miller	Fighting – major	19:39	5:00
3rd	BOS	John Wensink	Fighting – major	19:39	5:00
3rd	MTL	Guy Lapointe	Fighting – major	19:39	5:00
3rd	MTL	Doug Risebrough	Fighting – major	19:39	5:00
3rd	MTL	Mario Tremblay	Fighting – major	19:39	5:00

Shots by period
Team	1	2	3	Total
Boston	11	7	12	30
Montreal	11	14	5	30

=== Game four ===
May 25	Montreal Canadiens	4–1	Boston Bruins	Boston Garden	Recap

Scoring summary
Period	Team	Goal	Assist(s)	Time	Score
1st	BOS	Brad Park (2) – pp	Don Marcotte (4) and Gregg Sheppard (10)	04:05	1–0 BOS
1st	MTL	Steve Shutt (9)	Pierre Mondou (6) and Larry Robinson (16)	07:01	1–1
1st	MTL	Mario Tremblay (1)	Pierre Mondou (7) and Larry Robinson (17)	09:20	2–1 MTL
2nd	MTL	Mario Tremblay (2)	Yvon Lambert (4) and Bill Nyrop (4)	13:37	3–1 MTL
2nd	MTL	Rejean Houle (3)	Doug Jarvis (5)	17:46	4–1 MTL
3rd	None				
Penalty summary
Period	Team	Player	Penalty	Time	PIM
1st	MTL	Bill Nyrop	Holding	03:43	2:00
1st	MTL	Dennis O'Brien	Holding	04:54	2:00
2nd	BOS	Stan Jonathan	Boarding	04:34	2:00
2nd	MTL	Doug Jarvis	Interference	07:09	2:00
2nd	BOS	John Wensink	Interference	08:43	2:00
3rd	None				

Shots by period
Team	1	2	3	Total
Montreal	8	9	7	24
Boston	4	4	8	16

== Team rosters ==
=== Boston Bruins ===
No.	Nat	Player	Pos	S/G	Age	Acquired	Birthplace
6	(Canada)	Dennis O'Brien	D	L	28	1975	Port Hope, Ontario
7	(Canada)	Sean Shanahan	RW	R	27	1978	Toronto, Ontario
8	(United States)	Peter McNab	C	L	26	1976	Vancouver, British Columbia
10	(Canada)	Jean Ratelle	C	L	37	1975	Lac Saint-Jean, Quebec
11	(Canada)	Bobby Schmautz	RW	R	33	1973	Saskatoon, Saskatchewan
12	(Canada)	Wayne Cashman (C)	LW	R	32	1965	Kingston, Ontario
14	(United States)	Bob Miller	C	L	21	1976	Medford, Massachusetts
16	(Canada)	Rick Middleton	RW	R	24	1976	Toronto, Ontario
17	(Canada)	Stan Jonathan	LW	L	22	1975	Ohsweken, Ontario
18	(Netherlands)	John Wensink	LW	L	25	1976	Cornwall, Ontario
19	(Canada)	Gregg Sheppard	C	L	29	1972	North Battleford, Saskatchewan
20	(Canada)	Al Sims	D	L	25	1973	Toronto, Ontario
21	(Canada)	Don Marcotte	LW	L	31	1967	Arthabaska, Quebec
22	(Canada)	Brad Park	D	L	29	1975	Toronto, Ontario
23	(Canada)	Rick Smith	D	L	29	1972	Kingston, Ontario
24	(Canada)	Terry O'Reilly	RW	R	26	1971	Niagara Falls, Ontario
25	(Canada)	Gary Doak	D	R	32	1972	Goderich, Ontario
26	(United States)	Mike Milbury	D	L	25	1975	Brighton, Massachusetts
30	(Canada)	Gerry Cheevers	G	L	37	1976	St. Catharines, Ontario
31	(Canada)	Ron Grahame	G	L	27	1977	Victoria, British Columbia

=== Montreal Canadiens ===
No.	Nat	Player	Pos	S/G	Age	Acquired	Birthplace
1	(Canada)	Michel Larocque	G	L	26	1972	Hull, Quebec
2	(United States)	Bill Nyrop	D	L	25	1972	Washington, D.C.
3	(Canada)	Brian Engblom	D	L	23	1975	Winnipeg, Manitoba
5	(Canada)	Guy Lapointe	D	L	30	1969	Montreal, Quebec
6	(Canada)	Pierre Mondou	C	R	22	1975	Sorel, Quebec
8	(Canada)	Doug Risebrough	C	L	24	1974	Guelph, Ontario
10	(Canada)	Guy Lafleur	RW	R	26	1971	Montreal, Quebec
11	(Canada)	Yvon Lambert	LW	L	27	1971	Drummondville, Quebec
12	(Canada)	Yvan Cournoyer (C)	RW	L	34	1963	Montreal, Quebec
14	(Canada)	Mario Tremblay	RW	R	21	1974	Alma, Quebec
15	(Canada)	Rejean Houle	RW	L	28	1969	Rouyn, Quebec
17	(Canada)	Murray Wilson	LW	L	26	1971	Toronto, Canada
18	(Canada)	Serge Savard	D	L	32	1966	Landrienne, Quebec
19	(Canada)	Larry Robinson	D	L	26	1971	Winchester, Ontario
21	(Canada)	Doug Jarvis	C	L	23	1975	Brantford, Ontario
22	(Canada)	Steve Shutt	LW	L	25	1972	North York, Ontario
23	(Canada)	Bob Gainey	LW	L	23	1973	Peterborough, Ontario
24	(Canada)	Gilles Lupien	D	L	24	1974	Lachute, Quebec
25	(Canada)	Jacques Lemaire	C	L	32	1967	LaSalle, Quebec
26	(Canada)	Pierre Bouchard	D	L	30	1965	Longueuil, Quebec
27	(United States)	Rick Chartraw	D	R	23	1974	Caracas, Venezuela
28	(Canada)	Pierre Larouche	C	L	22	1977	Taschereau, Quebec
29	(Canada)	Ken Dryden	G	L	30	1964	Hamilton, Ontario

== Stanley Cup engraving ==
The 1978 Stanley Cup was presented to Canadiens captain Yvan Cournoyer by NHL President John Ziegler following the Canadiens 4–1 win over the Bruins in game six.

The following Canadiens players and staff had their names engraved on the Stanley Cup

1977–78 Montreal Canadiens

=== Players ===
Centers

Wingers

- 10 Guy Lafleur
- 11 Yvon Lambert
- 12 Yvan Cournoyer (Captain)
- 14 Mario Tremblay
- 15 Rejean Houle
- 17 Murray Wilson*
- 22 Steve Shutt
- 23 Bob Gainey

Defencemen

- 2 Bill Nyrop
- 3 Brian Engblom
- 5 Guy Lapointe
- 18 Serge Savard
- 19 Larry Robinson
- 24 Gilles Lupien
- 26 Pierre Bouchard
- 27 Rick Chartraw

Goaltenders

- 1 Michel Bunny Larocque
- 29 Ken Dryden
- * Did not play or dress in the Final. Name engraved on Stanley Cup despite not officially qualifying.^{[A]}

=== Coaching and administrative staff ===
- Jacques Courtois (President), Sam Pollock (Vice President/General Manager)
- Jean Beliveau (Vice President - Director of Cooperate Relations), William Scotty Bowman (Head Coach)
- Peter Bronfman (Chairman/Owner/Director), Edward Bronfman (Executive Director/Owner)
- Al MacNeil (Director of Player Personnel), Eddy Palchak (Trainer), Pierre Meilleur (Asst. Trainer)
- Claude Ruel (Director of Player Development), Floyd Curry (Asst. General Manager), Ron Caron (Asst. General Manager)

=== Stanley Cup engraving ===
- ^{^[A]} Murray Wilson only played 12 games due to spinal fusion surgery. His name was engraved on the Cup in 1978, even though he did not qualify.

== See also ==
- 1977–78 NHL season

Preceded by Montreal Canadiens; 1977	Montreal Canadiens; Stanley Cup champions 1978	Succeeded by Montreal Canadiens; 1979
