= Terry O'Reilly =

Canadian ice hockey player (born 1951)

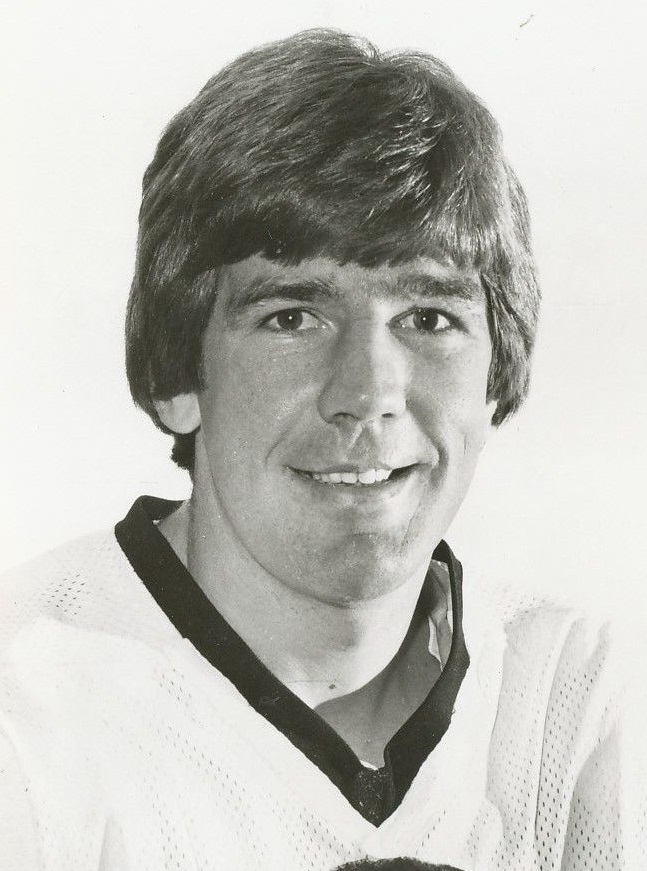
- O'Reilly with the Boston Bruins in 1978
- Born: June 7, 1951 (age 75) Niagara Falls, Ontario, Canada
- Height: 6 ft 1 in (185 cm)
- Weight: 200 lb (91 kg; 14 st 4 lb)
- Position: Right wing
- Shot: Right
- Played for: Boston Bruins
- NHL draft: 14th overall, 1971; Boston Bruins
- Playing career: 1971–1985

Terence Joseph James O'Reilly (born June 7, 1951) is a Canadian former professional ice hockey right winger. He played for the National Hockey League (NHL)'s Boston Bruins and featured in three Stanley Cup Finals. He was one of the most effective enforcers in NHL history.

== Early life ==
O’Reilly was born in Niagara Falls, Ontario to his parents Audrey and Jim O’Reilly. His family comes from Irish ancestry. He grew up in Oshawa, Ontario and started playing hockey at a very young age. Terry originally started out as a goaltender until he was 13. As a junior, Terry had problems initially sticking with the Oshawa Generals. He even turned down a scholarship offer from St. Louis University in order to continue playing for the Generals which would end up work out in his favor.

Throughout his career, O'Reilly would continue his education part time at the University of Toronto, the University of Ottawa and Boston University.

== Playing career ==
Known throughout his career for an erratic skating style and buzzing all over the ice. O’Reilly played three years of junior hockey with the Oshawa Generals from 1968 to 1971. He had his best year with the team during the 1970–71 season, scoring 23 goals and 42 assists in 54 games.

O'Reilly was picked by the Boston Bruins in the first round as the 14th pick overall in the 1971 NHL Amateur Draft. On the day Bruins general manager Milt Schmidt signed 20-year-old O'Reilly to his first pro contract, Schmidt referred to him proudly as "a typical Boston Bruins player:"

After being drafted he would play with the Bruins affiliate the Boston Braves during the 1971–72 season. He appeared in 60 games for the Braves scoring 9 goals and 8 assists helping lead them the F. G. "Teddy" Oke Trophy as the eastern division regular season champions. However the team lost in the second round of the playoffs to Nova Scotia. O'Reilly then made his NHL debut in the Bruins' final game of the 1971–72 regular season on April 2, 1972. He scored his first NHL goal in Boston's 6–4 victory over Toronto at Boston Garden.

After only playing one year in the minors O'Reilly officially made the Bruins in his second year during the 1972-73 season. In his first full year he played in 72 games recording 5 goals and 22 assists, as the Bruins finished with a 51-22-5 record finishing second in the East Division. However the Bruins were eliminated by New York Rangers in the first round.

During the 1973-74 season O’Reilly would play in 76 games while also showing improvement in his scoring with 35 points along with his first 10+ goal season. That year the Bruins finished with the leagues best record going 52-17-9. During the postseason O’Reilly would claim both his first playoff goal and assist as the Bruins defeated both Toronto and Chicago to reach the 1974 Stanley Cup final. However the Bruins would be defeated in the finals by the Philadelphia Flyers 4-2.

In 1974-75 O’Reilly would show even more improvement and for his hard play he was invited to the NHL all star game for the first time he would go on to score 1 goal and tally 1 assist in the game. However on Bostons March 7, 1975 game he would sprain his right ankle resulting in him missing a few games. He then re-aggravated the injury on March 15 and did not return till Boston's April 6, 1975. By the end of the year O’Reilly appeared in 68 games scoring 15 goals and 20 assists. The Bruins finished with a 40-26-14 record however they were eliminated by the Blackhawk’s in the first round. Both seasons O’Reilly would be given the Bruins Eddie Shore award for his hustle/determination.

The 1975-76 season seen a significant increase in O’Reilly’s point production as he appeared in all 80 games for the Bruins having his first 20+ goal season with 23 goals and 27 assists. The Bruins finished a top of the Adams Division with a 48-15-17 record he helped lead the Bruins past Los Angeles in the second round however the Bruins lost in the conference semifinal’s to the Flyers 4-1.

In 1976-77 O'Reilly discovered chemistry with center Peter McNab. The line, often featuring Al Secord on left wing, became a serious offensive threat. O'Reilly would crash and bang in the corners and more often than not would come out with the puck. In 79 games O'Reilly scored 14 goals and 41 goals. The Bruins once again finished first in the Adams division O’Reilly and the Bruins knocked off Los Angeles in the second round once again 4-2, along with sweeping the Flyers in the conference championship to reach the 1977 Stanley Cup Final where they were swept by Montreal.

Early on in the 1977-78 season On Nov. 10, 1977, O’Reilly scored his first NHL hat trick vs. Los Angeles. He went on to have a strong year, recording career highs with 29 goals and 61 assists in 77 games. His performance earned him a second NHL All-Star Game appearance and he finished 7th in league scoring. He also became only the third player in Boston Bruins history to lead the team in both points and penalty minutes. That season, the Bruins set and NHL record with 11 players scoring at least 20 goals. In the process he would help lead the Bruins to yet another Adams Division title, O’Reilly would also have his best postseason scoring 15 points (5 goals and 10 assists) in 15 games. He and the Bruins would defeat both Chicago and Philadelphia to reach the Stanley Cup for a second consecutive year however they were once again defeated by Montreal 4-2.

Although his numbers decreased from the following year, O’Reilly still went on to have a successful 1978-79. As he appeared in all 80 games for the second time in his career he nearly averaged a point a game scoring 77 (26 goals 51 assists). The Bruins won the Adams Division once again with a 43-23-13 record, swept Pittsburgh in the first round, before they were ultimately defeated by Montreal 4-3 in the conference championship.

1979-80 seen O’Reilly appear in 71 games scoring 19 goals and 42 assists for 61 points. He and the Bruins failed to capture the Adams Division but still made the postseason with a 46-21-13 record. They defeated Pittsburgh in the first round but were then defeated by the Islanders 4-1. during this season and the previous he had 211 and 205 minutes in penalties in those seasons respectively, displaying an excellent balance of grit and scoring.

In 1980-81 O’Reilly’s numbers dropped blow 50 for the first time in 5 seasons however he still remained a productive player for the team. In 77 games he scored 43 points (8 goals and 35 assists). The Bruins finished that year with a 37-30-13 record and were eliminated in the first round by Minnesota. During the off-season surgery to repair a torn rotator cuff in right shoulder on June 19, 1981. Throughout most of the 1980-81 season he had played through the pain of the injury.

O’Reilly missed 10 games throughout the 1981-82 season due to stretched nerves in left shoulder. In the 70 games he appeared in he had his 4th and final 20+ goal season along with 30 assists for 52 points. The Bruins went 43-27-10 and beat Buffalo in the first round, but were ultimately eliminated by Quebec in the second round 4-3.

O’Reilly was suspended the first 10 games of the 1982-83 due to an event that happened in Game 7 of their Adams Division Final series vs. Quebec the following year, where he accidentally punched referee Andy Van Hellemond who intervened early while O’Reilly was in the middle of a fight with Dale Hunter. He was then plagued by injures throughout the rest of the year only appearing in 19 games scoring 20 points. First being suffered when he was slashed by Roland Melanson during Boston's November 18, 1982. He returned on December 9, 1982, vs. Montreal. However he then missed remainder of season and playoffs with torn ligaments and torn cartilage in left knee, that he suffered when his skate got caught in a rut on the ice during Boston's Dec. 31, 1982, game at Minnesota. This resulted in season ending surgery.

Upon his return he was promoted to the Bruins captain ahead of the 1983–84 season. That year O’Reilly once again suffered multiple injuries resulting in him only appearing in 58 games during the regular season where he scored 12 goals and 18 assists. The Bruins were then swept by Montreal in the first round. O’Reilly remained team Captain during his final season in 1984-85 however injuries piled up once again resulting in him playing in 63 of the 80 games once again scoring 30 points (13 goals 17 assists). During a game vs. Minnesota that year O’Reilly had dislocated his shoulder and instead of sitting out the rest of the game, during the second intermission he had the Bruins trainer put him in a sling and he went on to finish the game. The Bruins barely made the playoffs that year with a 36-34-10 record and lost 3-2 to Montreal in the first round. O’Reilly only age 33 at the time officially retired at the end of the year to coach and spend more time with his family.

=== O'Reilly Jumps into the stands ===
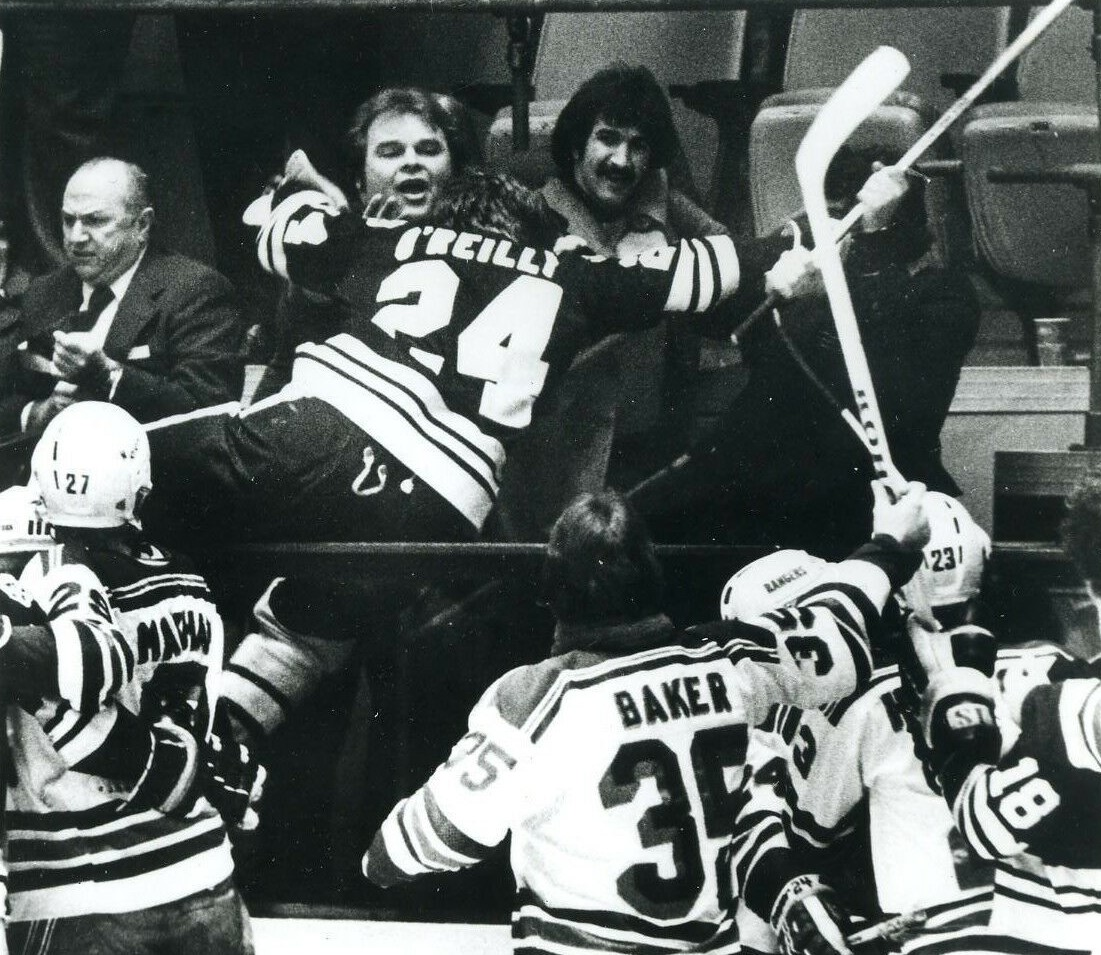
O'Reilly charges into the stands during an incident at Madison Square Garden in 1979

In the infamous December 23, 1979, incident at Madison Square Garden, during a post-game scrum, a New York Rangers fan rolled up a program tightly and smacked Stan Jonathan in the face drawing blood, then stole his stick and wielded it like a weapon. O'Reilly scaled the glass and charged into the stands successfully tracking down the fan with the stick. His teammates Peter McNab and Mike Milbury then followed when other fans tried to intervene. O'Reilly was suspended eight games for his part in the brawl. After the fact O’Reilly was quoted stating “There was no way he was going to strike one of my teammates and steal his stick, wield it like a weapon and then disappear into the crowd and go to a local bar with a souvenir and a great story.”

== Play style and legacy ==
He finished his 13-year career with 204 goals, 402 assists for 606 points, a +212 plus/minus, 2,095 minutes in penalties and 150 fighting majors. As of January 1, 2022, O'Reilly was ranked 20th in career goals scored by a Boston Bruin in regular-season play.

On October 24, 2002 The Bruins held Terry O'Reilly night and retired his No. 24 he stood at center ice along with his two children during the ceremony.

During his career O'Reilly was one of the most feared men of the ice. He wasn’t afraid to go at his opponents full speed crashing into them with fists swinging. O’Reilly was also known for his hard work always being the first to skate onto the ice and the last to skate off of the ice. The Cape Cod Times wrote "his talent was always secondary to his toughness and his willingness to do whatever it took to get the puck. He could dig in by the crease and wait for a pass, fight for the puck in the corner or simply fight, a style that endeared him to the blue-collar Bruins fans."

O'Reilly was known for being a tough player, racking up over 200 penalty minutes in five consecutive seasons, and earning for himself the nickname "Bloody O'Reilly" in the press. His teammate, Phil Esposito, dubbed O'Reilly "Taz" in reference to the Tasmanian Devil cartoon character for O'Reilly's reckless, hard driving style of play. He was very protective of his teammates. When the Bruins retired O'Reilly's No. 24, Ray Bourque noted that O'Reilly's banner "hangs next to mine, protecting me again."

He was also known for his leadership skills and would often stay late after practice helping younger players. His former teammate Frank Simonetti stated "He would stay late after practice and we'd do skills drills and he'd be out there early, He was an 11th-year player, he didn't have to do that. But it's just what he did and kind of mentored a lot of the younger players and was always there for advice and obviously on the ice."

Former Bruins coach Don Cherry was quoted as saying, “Terry typifies our team. He’s tough, really tough, and that’s the way I like ‘em.”

O’Reilly is looked back on fondly by Bruins fans being referred to as the Ultimate Bruin giving everything he could to the team. Former Bruins Gm and coach Harry Sinden would describe O’Reilly as “The model of a Bruins player to his teammates and fans alike and that phrase is a high compliment because of Terry."

In 2023 he was named to the Boston Bruins All-Centennial Team.

O’Reilly’s #17 jersey was retired by the Oshawa Generals on Sunday, September 28, 2025.

== Coaching career ==
At the start of the 1986–87 O’Reily began working as a color commentator on NESN. However he left the booth mid season to become the head coach of the Bruins by replacing Harry Sinden. After finishing that year 34-27-6 overall and bringing the Bruins to the playoffs he got the permanent head coaching spot. He went 44–30–6 in his second year, During the playoffs O’Reilly and the Bruins would end the Canadiens streak of having beaten the Bruins in 18 consecutive playoff series, dating back to 1946. Eventually taking the Bruins all the way to the 1988 Stanley Cup finals and winning the conference championship. However they would fall to the Wayne Gretzky-led Edmonton Oilers in the finals. He would keep his job until 1989, when he left to care for, and spend more time with his son, Evan, who was seriously ill with liver disease. O'Reilly later became an assistant coach for the Rangers from 2002 to the end of 2003–04 NHL season.

== Personal life/retirement ==
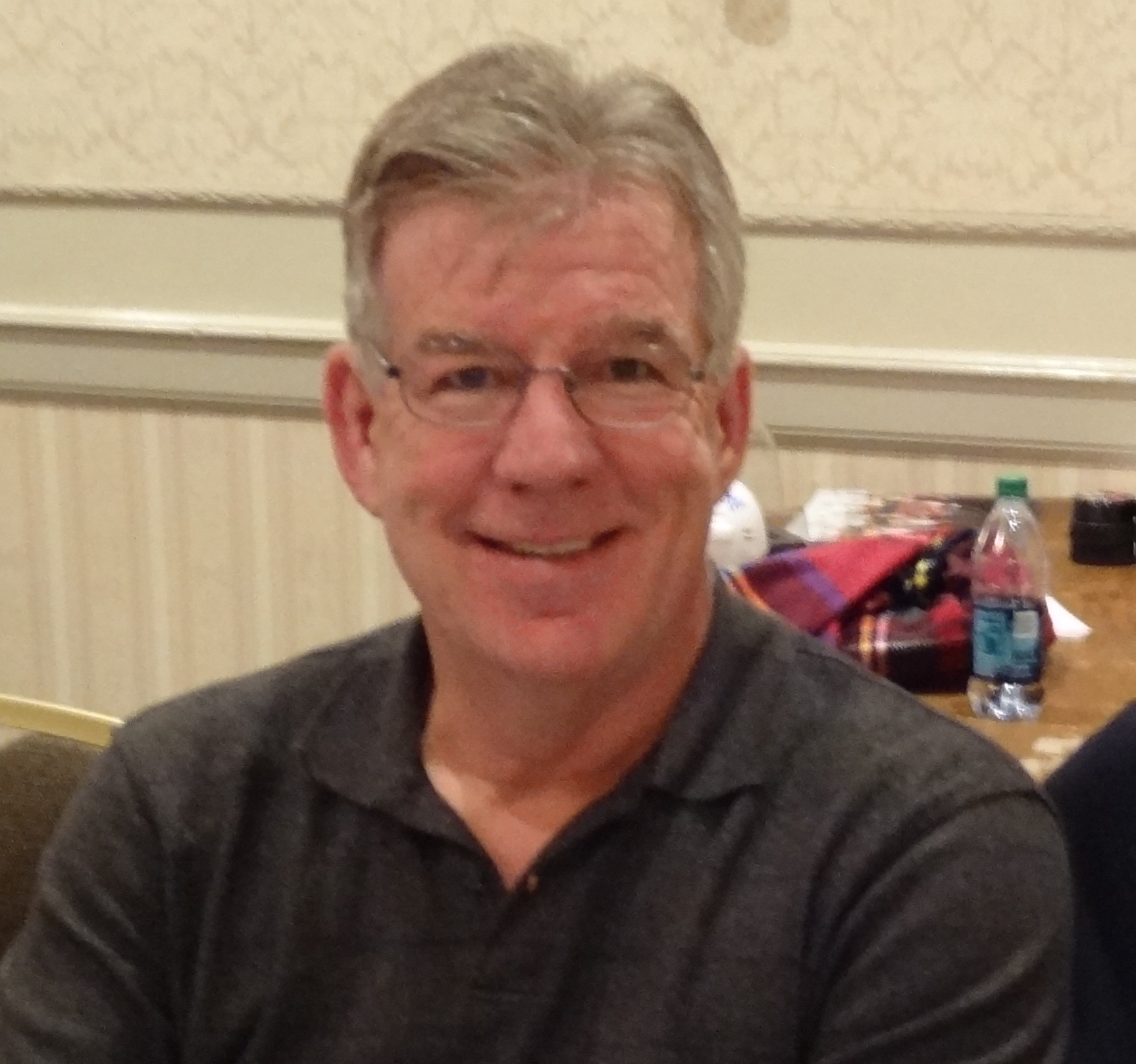
O'Reilly in 2012

O'Reilly ran a construction business in the Boston area during the 1990s after ending his coaching career. He was also extremely active in helping raise funds for the American Liver Foundation. After his coaching stint with the Rangers he returned to Boston and went into the real-estate business.

Throughout his playing career he was an avid chess player and brought portable chess set on road trips early in NHL career.

In the Adam Sandler movie Happy Gilmore, O'Reilly is mentioned as Happy Gilmore's favorite hockey player when growing up due to his tough style of play.

O'Reilly has stated his favorite player who plays for the Bruins is Milan Lucic, also born on June 7.

He was inducted into the Oshawa Sports Hall of Fame in 1990.

On August 24, 2015, O'Reilly threw out the ceremonial first pitch at a Portland Sea dogs game.

He now resides in Salisbury Massachusetts. He still remains active with the Bruins alumni organization playing in charity games. Also being involved in the local community.

O'Reilly has been married twice. Having 2 sons Evan and Conor. His son Evan would be the youngest person to ever be elected as a select man in Georgetown. However O’Reilly would lose him to liver disease in 2018.

In 2010 O'Reilly would take part in the Boston Bruins legends game at Fenway Park.

He was honored by the TD Garden's The Sports Museum as part of their class of 2005 and given the hockey legacy award.

== Awards, honours and records ==
- NHL All-Star Game — 1975, 1978
- Won the Seventh Player Award — 1975
- Won the Elizabeth C. Dufresne Trophy — 1978
- Won the Eddie Shore Award — 1974, 1975
- Bruins Three Stars Awards — 1978, 1979, 1980
- NHL All-Star Game coach – 1989
- Oshawa Sports Hall of Fame (Class of 1990)
- His #24 jersey number was retired by the Boston Bruins on October 24, 2002.
- Named One of the Top 100 Best Bruins Players of all Time.
- Boston Bruins All-Centennial Team
- His #17 jersey number was retired by the Oshawa Generals on September 28, 2025.

=== Records ===
Most Penalty Minutes in Boston Bruins franchise history.

== Career statistics ==
| | | | Regular season | | | | | Playoffs |
| Season | Team | League | GP | G | A | Pts | PIM | GP | G | A | Pts | PIM |
|---|---|---|---|---|---|---|---|---|---|---|---|---|
| 1968–69 | Oshawa Generals | OHA-Jr. | 46 | 5 | 15 | 20 | 87 | — | — | — | — | — |
| 1969–70 | Oshawa Generals | OHA-Jr. | 54 | 13 | 36 | 49 | 60 | 6 | 1 | 5 | 6 | 22 |
| 1970–71 | Oshawa Generals | OHA-Jr. | 54 | 23 | 42 | 65 | 151 | — | — | — | — | — |
| 1971–72 | Boston Braves | AHL | 60 | 9 | 8 | 17 | 134 | 9 | 2 | 2 | 4 | 31 |
| 1971–72 | Boston Bruins | NHL | 1 | 1 | 0 | 1 | 0 | — | — | — | — | — |
| 1972–73 | Boston Bruins | NHL | 72 | 5 | 22 | 27 | 109 | 5 | 0 | 0 | 0 | 2 |
| 1973–74 | Boston Bruins | NHL | 76 | 11 | 24 | 35 | 94 | 16 | 2 | 5 | 7 | 38 |
| 1974–75 | Boston Bruins | NHL | 68 | 15 | 20 | 35 | 146 | 3 | 0 | 0 | 0 | 17 |
| 1975–76 | Boston Bruins | NHL | 80 | 23 | 27 | 50 | 150 | 12 | 3 | 1 | 4 | 25 |
| 1976–77 | Boston Bruins | NHL | 79 | 14 | 41 | 55 | 147 | 14 | 5 | 6 | 11 | 28 |
| 1977–78 | Boston Bruins | NHL | 77 | 29 | 61 | 90 | 211 | 15 | 5 | 10 | 15 | 40 |
| 1978–79 | Boston Bruins | NHL | 80 | 26 | 51 | 77 | 205 | 11 | 0 | 6 | 6 | 25 |
| 1979–80 | Boston Bruins | NHL | 71 | 19 | 42 | 61 | 265 | 10 | 3 | 6 | 9 | 69 |
| 1980–81 | Boston Bruins | NHL | 77 | 8 | 35 | 43 | 233 | 3 | 1 | 2 | 3 | 12 |
| 1981–82 | Boston Bruins | NHL | 70 | 22 | 30 | 52 | 213 | 11 | 5 | 4 | 9 | 56 |
| 1982–83 | Boston Bruins | NHL | 19 | 6 | 14 | 20 | 40 | — | — | — | — | — |
| 1983–84 | Boston Bruins | NHL | 58 | 12 | 18 | 30 | 124 | 3 | 0 | 0 | 0 | 14 |
| 1984–85 | Boston Bruins | NHL | 63 | 13 | 17 | 30 | 168 | 5 | 1 | 2 | 3 | 9 |
| NHL totals | | | 891 | 204 | 402 | 606 | 2,095 | 108 | 25 | 42 | 67 | 335 |

== Coaching statistics ==
| Team | Year | Regular season | | | | | | Post season |
| Team | Year | G | W | L | T | Pts | Division Rank | Result |
|---|---|---|---|---|---|---|---|---|
| Boston Bruins | 1986–87 | 67 | 34 | 27 | 6 | 74 | 3rd in Adams | Lost in first round |
| Boston Bruins | 1987–88 | 80 | 44 | 30 | 6 | 94 | 2nd in Adams | Lost in finals |
| Boston Bruins | 1988–89 | 80 | 37 | 29 | 14 | 88 | 2nd in Adams | Lost in second round |
| Total | | 227 | 115 | 86 | 26 | | | |

== See also ==
- List of NHL players with 2,000 career penalty minutes

Awards and achievements
| Preceded by Ron Jones | Boston Bruins first-round draft pick 1971 | Succeeded by Mike Bloom |
Sporting positions
| Preceded by Wayne Cashman | Boston Bruins captain 1983–1985 | Succeeded by Ray Bourque; Rick Middleton |
| Preceded by Butch Goring | Head coach of the Boston Bruins; 1986–1989 | Succeeded by Mike Milbury |
