= Peter McNab =

Canadian-born American ice hockey player (1952–2022)

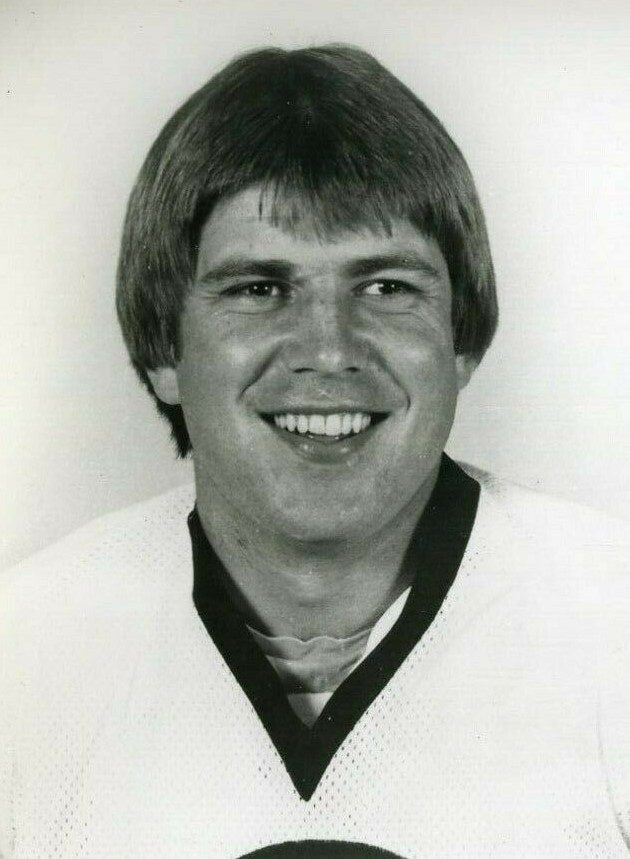
- Born: May 8, 1952 Vancouver, British Columbia, Canada
- Died: November 6, 2022 (aged 70) Denver, Colorado, U.S.
- Height: 6 ft 3 in (191 cm)
- Weight: 210 lb (95 kg; 15 st 0 lb)
- Position: Centre
- Shot: Left
- Played for: Buffalo Sabres; Boston Bruins; Vancouver Canucks; New Jersey Devils
- National team: United States
- NHL draft: 85th overall, 1972; Buffalo Sabres
- Playing career: 1973–1987

Peter Maxwell McNab (May 8, 1952 – November 6, 2022) was a Canadian-born American professional ice hockey player. He played 14 seasons in the National Hockey League (NHL) from 1973 to 1987, with the Buffalo Sabres, Boston Bruins, Vancouver Canucks, and New Jersey Devils. He later served as the color commentator for the Colorado Avalanche from their inaugural 1995–96 season until his death.

== Playing career ==
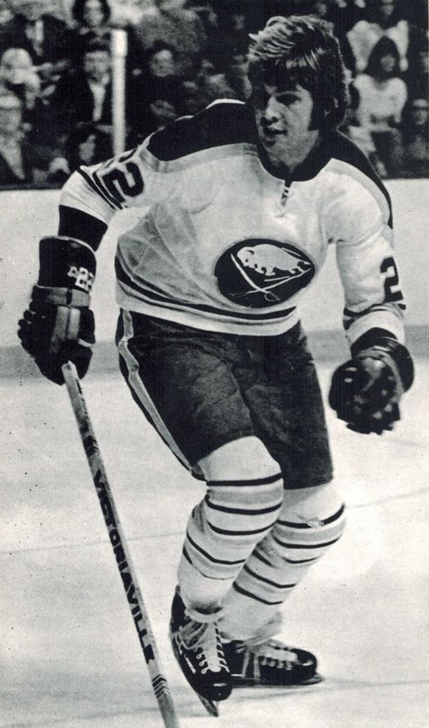
McNab in 1974 photo for Buffalo Sabres

=== Amateur career ===
Born in Vancouver, McNab spent his early childhood in British Columbia before moving to San Diego, California at age 14, where his father was head coach of the minor-league San Diego Gulls. Peter initially excelled as a baseball player; he entered the University of Denver (DU) on a baseball scholarship and later made the ice hockey team, becoming an all-WCHA selection in 1973. In the early 1970s NCAA players rarely made it to the National Hockey League, but McNab was drafted by the Buffalo Sabres while playing forward for the Denver Pioneers in 1972.

=== Professional career ===
McNab led the Cincinnati Swords of the American Hockey League (AHL) in scoring in 1973–74, despite playing in 49 of 76 games, and debuted with Buffalo that same season. While with Buffalo, he scored his first NHL goal on December 15, 1973, against the Minnesota North Stars. He helped the Sabres reach the 1975 Stanley Cup Finals.

On June 11, 1976, the Sabres traded the rights to McNab, a free agent, to the Boston Bruins in exchange for the rights to Andre Savard. He would enjoy the best years of his NHL career in Boston. With his best statistical season coming in his first year with the team in 1976-77. Scoring 86 points (38 goals and 48 assists). Leading to him playing in the 1977 NHL All-Star Game. The Bruins reached the Stanley Cup Finals in 1977 and 1978. McNab continued to put up great numbers for the bruins during the rest of his tenure having back to back 80 points seasons in 1978 and 1979 finishing as runner-up for the Lady Byng Trophy in 1978. He also twice scored a playoff overtime winning goal. He led the Bruins in goals for a third straight year in 1980 and had an 83-point season (37 goals 46 assists) the following year in 1981. In total from 1977 to 1983 he scored at least 35 goals and 75 points six seasons in a row. As his time with the Bruins coming to an end after the 1983-84 season.

During his time with the Bruins he scored 7 hat tricks.

On December 23, 1979, during a game at Madison Square Garden in New York, Bruins player Stan Johnathan was punched and had his stick taken by a Rangers fan. Terry O’Reily climbed into the stands to track down a fan that had stolen the stick. McNab, teammate Mike Milbury, and several other Bruins climbed into the stands to confront fans. McNab engaged in a physical confrontation with one fan, and was soon joined by Milbury, who removed the fan's shoe and proceeded to strike the fan with it. McNab later stated to a news reporter. “We had to go up there," "It's not something to be proud of, but we couldn't leave Terry up there alone. The guy had a stick and he was swinging it."

On April 9, 1981, North Stars goaltender Don Beaupre stopped a McNab penalty shot, the first penalty shot ever taken by a member of the Bruins in a playoff game. As of 2022 McNab is among Boston's top ten career leaders in goals, points and playoff scoring.

On April 11, 1982, McNab set an NHL playoff record for most points in a single period with 4. The record has since been broken. But it still remains the record for any Boston Bruins player.

The Bruins traded McNab to the Vancouver Canucks in 1984; he played in Vancouver for two seasons before signing with the New Jersey Devils, for whom his father Max was the general manager at the time. He also made his international debut for the U.S. national team at the 1986 World Championships in Moscow. He retired from hockey at the end of the 1986–87 season after playing two seasons in New Jersey.

In 2021 McNab was inducted into the U.S hockey hall of fame.

== Post-playing career ==
After retiring, McNab began his broadcasting career as a color analyst for the Devils starting in the 1987–88 season. After eight years broadcasting on SportsChannel for the Devils, he moved to Colorado for the inaugural season of the Colorado Avalanche. He was also a TV announcer on NBC as an analyst on NHL on NBC during the 2006 Winter Olympic games in Turin, Italy, and as a color analyst on TNT for the Olympic games in Nagano, Japan. He also served as TSN's studio analyst and host for the 2002 Winter Olympic Games in Salt Lake City, Utah.

On June 8, 2009, McNab signed a multi-year deal with Altitude, and started his 14th season as color commentator for the Colorado Avalanche at the beginning of the 2009–10 NHL season.

McNab, a popular figure among Avalanche fans who nicknamed him "Maxy", served as commentator for 27 years, covering all three of the team's Stanley cup championships in 1996, 2001 and 2022. After his death, Avalanche owner Stan Kroenke said "his passion for hockey was singular — as was his gift for celebrating what makes the sport so special. We were blessed that, for 27 years, he was an integral and indispensable part of our organization. His presence, insight and commitment to growing the sport made us all want to be greater stewards of hockey."

The Avalanche honored McNab in 2023 by naming their broadcast booth after him.

== Personal life ==
McNab was part of a prominent ice hockey family. His father Max McNab was a centre who won the Stanley Cup with the Detroit Red Wings in 1950, and later became a coach and general manager. Peter's brother, David, spent 43 seasons as an NHL scout and executive before retiring from his position as the senior vice president of hockey operations for the Anaheim Ducks in May 2021.

He was married to his wife Diana and had 5 daughters together.

In 2021, McNab was diagnosed with cancer. He continued his role as Avalanche color analyst throughout his chemotherapy. In February 2022, doctors informed McNab that his cancer was in remission. However, it returned while Colorado was trying to defend their 2022 Stanley Cup title, and McNab died on November 6, 2022, at the age of 70.

== Awards and honors ==
Award	Year
All-WCHA First Team	1972–73
All-NCAA All-Tournament Team†	1973†
San Diego Hall of Champions	2004

- † (participation later vacated)
- Played in NHL All-Star Game (1977)
- Bruins three stars award (1977, 1978, 1979, 1981)
- Inducted into the U.S Hockey Hall of Fame in 2021
- Named One of the Top 100 Best Bruins Players of all Time.

== Career statistics ==
=== Regular season and playoffs ===
			Regular season					Playoffs
Season	Team	League	GP	G	A	Pts	PIM	GP	G	A	Pts	PIM
1970–71	University of Denver	WCHA	29	19	14	33	6	—	—	—	—	—
1971–72	University of Denver	WCHA	38	27	38	65	16	—	—	—	—	—
1972–73	University of Denver	WCHA	38	32	40	72	18	—	—	—	—	—
1973–74	Cincinnati Swords	AHL	49	34	39	73	16	5	2	6	8	0
1973–74	Buffalo Sabres	NHL	22	3	6	9	2	—	—	—	—	—
1974–75	Buffalo Sabres	NHL	53	22	21	43	8	17	2	6	8	4
1975–76	Buffalo Sabres	NHL	79	24	32	56	16	8	0	0	0	0
1976–77	Boston Bruins	NHL	80	38	48	86	11	14	5	3	8	2
1977–78	Boston Bruins	NHL	79	41	39	80	4	15	8	11	19	2
1978–79	Boston Bruins	NHL	76	35	45	80	10	11	5	3	8	0
1979–80	Boston Bruins	NHL	74	40	38	78	10	10	8	6	14	2
1980–81	Boston Bruins	NHL	80	37	46	83	24	3	3	0	3	0
1981–82	Boston Bruins	NHL	80	36	40	76	19	11	6	8	14	6
1982–83	Boston Bruins	NHL	74	22	52	74	23	15	3	5	8	4
1983–84	Boston Bruins	NHL	52	14	16	30	10	—	—	—	—	—
1983–84	Vancouver Canucks	NHL	13	1	6	7	10	3	0	0	0	0
1984–85	Vancouver Canucks	NHL	75	23	25	48	10	—	—	—	—	—
1985–86	New Jersey Devils	NHL	71	19	24	43	14	—	—	—	—	—
1986–87	New Jersey Devils	NHL	46	8	12	20	8	—	—	—	—	—
NHL totals			954	363	450	813	179	107	42	40	82	20

=== International ===
Year	Team	Event	GP	G	A	Pts	PIM
1986	United States	WC	10	0	1	1	4
Senior totals			10	0	1	1	4
