= Guy Lapointe =

Canadian ice hockey player (born 1948)

- Hockey Hall of Fame, 1993
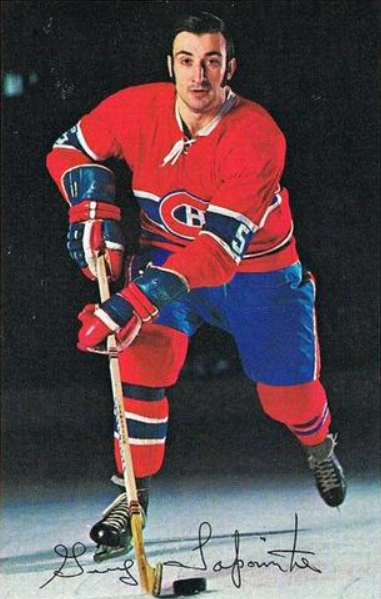
- Lapointe with the Montreal Canadiens in 1970
- Born: March 18, 1948 (age 78) Montreal, Quebec, Canada
- Height: 6 ft 0 in (183 cm)
- Weight: 205 lb (93 kg; 14 st 9 lb)
- Position: Defence
- Shot: Left
- Played for: Montreal Canadiens; St. Louis Blues; Boston Bruins
- National team: Canada
- Playing career: 1968–1984

Guy Gerard Lapointe (born March 18, 1948) is a Canadian former professional ice hockey defenceman who played for the Montreal Canadiens, St. Louis Blues and Boston Bruins in the National Hockey League (NHL). He retired in 2020 after serving as Coordinator of Amateur Scouting with the NHL's Minnesota Wild for 20 years.

== Career ==
Nicknamed "Pointu" (a play on his name in French, where "pointu" carries most of the same meanings as "sharp" or "pointy" in English), Lapointe was famous for his powerful slapshot and brutal body-checks.

Along with defencemen Larry Robinson and Serge Savard, Lapointe was a member of the "Big Three" and played a key role in the Canadiens' winning the Stanley Cup six times in 1971, 1973, 1976, 1977, 1978, 1979.

He was traded to the St. Louis Blues in 1982 and signed with the Boston Bruins after the following season. He retired in 1984 following a series of injuries.

Lapointe was inducted into the Hockey Hall of Fame in 1993. In 884 NHL games, Lapointe recorded 171 goals and 451 assists for 622 points. He still holds the Montreal Canadiens' record for most goals in a season for a defenceman (28), and most goals for a rookie defenceman (15). His number (#5) was retired by the Canadiens on November 8, 2014. Since the #5 is already retired on behalf of Bernie Geoffrion, they will both share the honour. Interestingly, similar to Bernie Geoffrion, his number was raised side by side with the number of other members whose numbers were already retired before him, though this time being the 2 other members of the "Big Three", Serge Savard and Larry Robinson (Savard and Robinson's banner were lowered halfway and were raised back up to the rafters with Lapointe's banner, just like what they did to Bernie Geoffrion and his father-in-law Howie Morenz).

== Coaching and scouting ==
Following his retirement from playing, Lapointe became general manager of the Longueuil Chevaliers of the Quebec Major Junior Hockey League, followed by a stint as associate coach with the Quebec Nordiques. He later served as an assistant coach and later as a scout with the Calgary Flames.

He was the Chief Amateur scout with the Minnesota Wild, a position he has held from the franchise's inception in 2000 to 2020.

== Personal life ==
He is the father of three children: Guy Jr., Stephanie and Jordan.

== Career statistics ==
=== Regular season and playoffs ===
			Regular season					Playoffs
Season	Team	League	GP	G	A	Pts	PIM	GP	G	A	Pts	PIM
1965–66	Verdun Jr. Maple Leafs	QJHL	37	7	13	20	96	—	—	—	—	—
1966–67	Verdun Jr. Maple Leafs	QJHL	—	—	—	—	—	12	1	1	2	14
1967–68	Montreal Junior Canadiens	OHA	51	11	27	38	147	11	1	6	7	40
1968–69	Montreal Canadiens	NHL	1	0	0	0	2	—	—	—	—	—
1968–69	Houston Apollos	CHL	65	3	15	18	120	3	1	0	1	6
1969–70	Montreal Canadiens	NHL	5	0	0	0	4	—	—	—	—	—
1969–70	Montreal Voyageurs	AHL	57	8	30	38	92	8	3	5	8	6
1970–71	Montreal Canadiens	NHL	78	15	29	44	107	20	4	5	9	34
1971–72	Montreal Canadiens	NHL	69	11	38	49	58	6	0	1	1	0
1972–73	Montreal Canadiens	NHL	76	19	35	54	117	17	6	7	13	20
1973–74	Montreal Canadiens	NHL	71	13	40	53	63	6	0	2	2	4
1974–75	Montreal Canadiens	NHL	80	28	47	75	88	11	6	4	10	4
1975–76	Montreal Canadiens	NHL	77	21	47	68	78	13	3	3	6	12
1976–77	Montreal Canadiens	NHL	77	25	51	76	53	12	3	9	12	4
1977–78	Montreal Canadiens	NHL	49	13	29	42	19	14	1	6	7	16
1978–79	Montreal Canadiens	NHL	69	13	42	55	43	10	2	6	8	10
1979–80	Montreal Canadiens	NHL	45	6	20	26	29	2	0	0	0	0
1980–81	Montreal Canadiens	NHL	33	1	9	10	79	1	0	0	0	17
1981–82	Montreal Canadiens	NHL	47	1	19	20	72	—	—	—	—	—
1981–82	St. Louis Blues	NHL	8	0	6	6	4	7	1	0	1	8
1982–83	St. Louis Blues	NHL	64	3	23	26	43	4	0	1	1	9
1983–84	Boston Bruins	NHL	45	2	16	18	34	—	—	—	—	—
NHL totals			894	171	451	622	893	123	26	44	70	138

=== Awards and accomplishments ===
- NHL First All-Star Team (1973)
- NHL Second All-Star Team (1975, 1976, 1977)
- Played in NHL All-Star Game (1973, 1975, 1976, 1977)

=== International ===
Year	Team	Event	GP	G	A	Pts	PIM
1972	Canada	SS	7	0	1	1	6
1976	Canada	CC	7	0	4	4	2
Senior totals			14	0	5	5	8

== International play ==
Early into his NHL career, Lapointe was chosen to play in the historic 1972 Summit Series against the USSR. Lapointe accepted the invitation regardless of the fact his wife would give birth to his first child (Guy Jr.), during the series, while the team was in the USSR. He would compete internationally again for Canada in the 1976 Canada Cup and the 1979 Challenge Cup against the Soviets, which replaced that year's All-Star Game.
