= Stan Jonathan =

Canadian ice hockey player

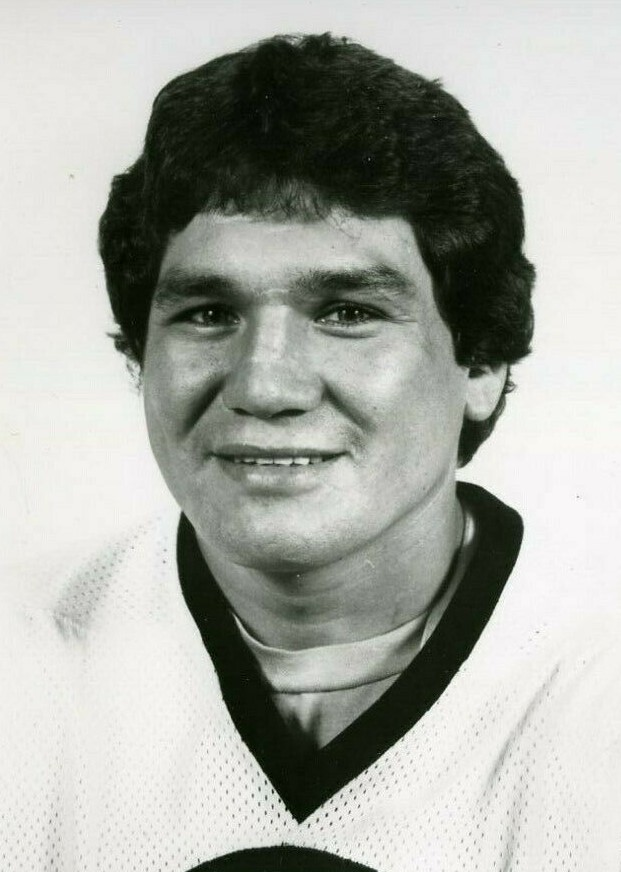
- Jonathan in 1980
- Born: September 5, 1955 (age 71) Ohsweken, Ontario, Canada
- Height: 5 ft 8 in (173 cm)
- Weight: 175 lb (79 kg; 12 st 7 lb)
- Position: Left wing
- Shot: Left
- Played for: Boston Bruins; Pittsburgh Penguins
- NHL draft: 86th overall, 1975; Boston Bruins
- WHA draft: 103rd overall, 8th round, 1975; Indianapolis Racers
- Playing career: 1975–1983

Stanley Carl "Bulldog" Jonathan (born September 5, 1955) is a Haudenosaunee former professional ice hockey left winger. He is best known for playing for the Boston Bruins of the National Hockey League (NHL), for whom he played for parts of eight seasons, and featured in two Stanley Cup Finals (1977, 1978). He finished his career with the Pittsburgh Penguins in 1982-83.

== Playing career ==
Stan Jonathan was drafted in the fifth round (86th overall) of the 1975 NHL entry draft by the Bruins. Ignored by most other scouts and by Bruins general manager Harry Sinden, Jonathan was picked up thanks to the shrewdness of Don Cherry, who had seen him play with the Peterborough Petes earlier that season, Jonathan's third season in Peterborough. Cherry stated later that the proudest discovery of his hockey career was Stan Jonathan.

While Jonathan played with Peterborough, they represented Canada well as they placed third at the first unofficial world junior championship in 1973–1974.

Jonathan started his NHL career with one game in the 1975–76 NHL season, before being called up permanently for the 1976–77 season. He typified Bruins hockey, displaying both outstanding offensive ability and toughness. Jonathan was adept at knocking in rebounds, and Cherry, his coach at the time, stated that he had the most accurate shot in the league. As a rookie, he led all NHL players in shooting percentage, putting goals in at a clip of 23.9%. That year, 1977–78, was his most productive season as he scored 27 goals with 25 assists. He also had 116 penalty minutes that year. his second season, he was again among the top-ten players in shooting percentage, at 22.3%. That year he won the Bruins' "7th Player Award" voted on by the fans for the player who exceeded expectations.

Besides his scoring touch, Jonathan was also a capable enforcer, having fought Keith Magnuson, Dave "The Hammer" Schultz, and Andre "Moose" Dupont. Arguably Jonathan's most famous moment was his savage beating of Pierre Bouchard in a brawl during game four of the 1978 Stanley Cup Finals. Challenged by Bouchard, who outweighed Jonathan by thirty pounds and stood six inches taller, Jonathan held his own, breaking Bouchard's nose and cheekbone and knocking him to the ice.

His 1978–79 season was shortened by an injury, but Jonathan played in all 11 playoff games of 1979. Jonathan scored a hat-trick in game six of Boston's semifinal series versus Montreal, contributing to a 5–2 win in game six of the semi-finals against the Montreal Canadiens, which forced a game seven. He returned the following year and scored 21 goals and 19 assists. He also added 208 penalty minutes.

The Bruins traded him to the Pittsburgh Penguins on November 8, 1982, in exchange for cash. Jonathan played 19 games for Pittsburgh and retired after the 1983 season. He finished his NHL career with 91 goals and 110 assists in 411 games.

== Personal life ==
Jonathan is a full-blooded Tuscarora, born in Ohsweken, Ontario, part of the Six Nations reserve near Brantford, Ontario, Canada. After his playing days were over, Jonathan stayed in the Boston area with his wife Cathy and two children Carl and Brandi. After twenty years, the family moved to Six Nations and built a house. Jonathan worked in construction, coaching, running a tent-rental business, and driving a snow plow.

Jonathan was charged with criminal negligence in a hunting accident on the Six Nations reserve that killed Peter Kosid of Hamilton, Ontario, on Sunday, November 11, 2012. Kosid was illegally bow hunting on the reserve without permission and without proper reflective hunting gear. The criminal charges were later withdrawn. After first filing a lawsuit against Jonathan, Kosid's family later settled with Jonathan's insurance company.

== Legacy ==
In 2023, he was named one of the top 100 Bruins players of all time.

Peterborough sports writer Don Barrie wrote in 2021 that Jonathan was one of the Petes' "all-time fan favourites".

Jonathan has been an inspiration to other Indigenous hockey players, including Gino Odjick.

== Career statistics ==
=== Regular season and playoffs ===
			Regular season					Playoffs
Season	Team	League	GP	G	A	Pts	PIM	GP	G	A	Pts	PIM
1972–73	Peterborough Petes	OHA-Jr.	63	14	35	49	107	—	—	—	—	—
1973–74	Peterborough Petes	OHA-Jr.	70	19	33	52	127	11	4	5	9	14
1974–75	Peterborough Petes	OMJHL	70	36	39	75	138	11	4	5	9	14
1975–76	Rochester Americans	AHL	6	1	1	2	0	—	—	—	—	—
1975–76	Boston Bruins	NHL	1	0	0	0	0	—	—	—	—	—
1975–76	Dayton Gems	IHL	69	26	47	73	192	15	13	8	21	54
1976–77	Rochester Americans	AHL	3	0	0	0	7	—	—	—	—	—
1976–77	Boston Bruins	NHL	69	17	13	30	69	14	4	2	6	24
1977–78	Boston Bruins	NHL	68	27	25	52	116	15	0	1	1	36
1978–79	Boston Bruins	NHL	33	6	9	15	96	11	4	1	5	12
1979–80	Boston Bruins	NHL	79	21	19	40	208	9	0	0	0	29
1980–81	Boston Bruins	NHL	74	14	24	38	192	3	0	0	0	30
1981–82	Boston Bruins	NHL	67	6	17	23	57	11	0	0	0	6
1982–83	Boston Bruins	NHL	1	0	0	0	0	—	—	—	—	—
1982–83	Pittsburgh Penguins	NHL	19	0	3	3	13	—	—	—	—	—
1982–83	Baltimore Skipjacks	AHL	48	13	23	36	86	—	—	—	—	—
1985–86	Brantford Motts Clamatos	OHA-Sr.	—	—	—	—	—	—	—	—	—	—
1986–87	Brantford Motts Clamatos	OHA-Sr.	1	0	0	0	2	—	—	—	—	—
NHL totals			411	91	110	201	751	63	8	4	12	137

=== International ===
Year	Team	Event	GP	G	A	Pts	PIM
1974	Canada	WJC	5	0	0	0	8
Junior totals			5	0	0	0	8
