= 1985–86 Montreal Canadiens season =

NHL hockey team season (won 23rd Stanley Cup)

1985–86 Montreal Canadiens
- Stanley Cup champions
- Wales Conference champions
- Division: 2nd Adams
- Conference: 5th Wales
- 1985–86 record: 40–33–7
- Home record: 25–11–4
- Road record: 15–22–3
- Goals for: 330
- Goals against: 280

Team information
- General manager: Serge Savard
- Coach: Jean Perron
- Captain: Bob Gainey
- Alternate captains: Mats Naslund (Mar-May); Larry Robinson; Mario Tremblay
- Arena: Montreal Forum

Team leaders
- Goals: Mats Naslund (43)
- Assists: Mats Naslund (67)
- Points: Mats Naslund (110)
- Penalty minutes: Chris Nilan (274)
- Plus/minus: Larry Robinson (+29)
- Wins: Patrick Roy (23)
- Goals against average: Patrick Roy (3.35)

The 1985–86 Montreal Canadiens season was the team's 77th season. The team won the Stanley Cup for the first time in seven seasons, and their 23rd overall.

== Regular season ==
=== Final standings ===
Adams Division
| | GP | W | L | T | GF | GA | Pts |
|---|---|---|---|---|---|---|---|
| **Quebec Nordiques** | 80 | 43 | 31 | 6 | 330 | 289 | 92 |
| **Montreal Canadiens** | 80 | 40 | 33 | 7 | 330 | 280 | 87 |
| **Boston Bruins** | 80 | 37 | 31 | 12 | 311 | 288 | 86 |
| **Hartford Whalers** | 80 | 40 | 36 | 4 | 332 | 302 | 84 |
| Buffalo Sabres | 80 | 37 | 37 | 6 | 296 | 291 | 80 |

Note: GP = Games played, W = Wins, L = Losses, T = Ties, Pts = Points, GF = Goals for, GA = Goals against
Note: Teams that qualified for the playoffs are highlighted in bold.

=== Record vs. opponents ===
Adams Division record vs. opponents

==== Vs. Wales Conference ====
**Vs. Adams Division**

1985–86 NHL records
| Team | **BOS** | **BUF** | **HFD** | **MTL** | **QUE** | **Total** |
|---|---|---|---|---|---|---|
| Boston | — | 3–3–2 | 4–3–1 | 3–4–1 | 1–5–2 | **11–15–6** |
| Buffalo | 3–3–2 | — | 2–6 | 3–5 | 4–4 | **12–18–2** |
| Hartford | 3–4–1 | 6–2 | — | 3–4–1 | 4–4 | **16–14–2** |
| Montreal | 4–3–1 | 5–3 | 4–3−1 | — | 2–6 | **15–15–2** |
| Quebec | 5–1–2 | 4–4 | 4–4 | 6–2 | — | **19–11–2** |

**Vs. Patrick Division**

1985–86 NHL records
| Team | **NJD** | **NYI** | **NYR** | **PHI** | **PIT** | **WSH** | **Total** |
|---|---|---|---|---|---|---|---|
| Boston | 3–0 | 0–1–2 | 1–2 | 1–2 | 2–1 | 0–2–1 | **7–8–3** |
| Buffalo | 2–1 | 2–1 | 3–0 | 2–1 | 0–2–1 | 1–1–1 | **10–6–2** |
| Hartford | 2–1 | 1–2 | 2–1 | 0–3 | 2–1 | 0–2–1 | **7–10–1** |
| Montreal | 2–1 | 2–1 | 0–2–1 | 1–2 | 2–0–1 | 0–2–1 | **7–8–3** |
| Quebec | 1–2 | 2–1 | 2–0–1 | 1–1–1 | 1–1–1 | 0–3 | **7–8–3** |

==== Vs. Campbell Conference ====
**Vs. Norris Division**

1985–86 NHL records
| Team | **CHI** | **DET** | **MIN** | **STL** | **TOR** | **Total** |
|---|---|---|---|---|---|---|
| Boston | 1–2 | 2–1 | 3–0 | 1–2 | 2–0–1 | **9–5–1** |
| Buffalo | 1–2 | 1–1–1 | 2–1 | 2–1 | 1–2 | **7–7–1** |
| Hartford | 1–2 | 2–1 | 1–2 | 1–1–1 | 3–0 | **8–6–1** |
| Montreal | 2–0–1 | 3–0 | 1–1–1 | 1–2 | 2–1 | **9–4–2** |
| Quebec | 2–1 | 2–1 | 2–1 | 1–2 | 3–0 | **10–5–0** |

**Vs. Smythe Division**

1985–86 NHL records
| Team | **CGY** | **EDM** | **LAK** | **VAN** | **WIN** | **Total** |
|---|---|---|---|---|---|---|
| Boston | 2–1 | 1–2 | 3–0 | 1–0–2 | 3–0 | **10–3–2** |
| Buffalo | 1–1–1 | 2–1 | 1–2 | 2–1 | 2–1 | **8–6–1** |
| Hartford | 2–1 | 0–3 | 2–1 | 3–0 | 2–1 | **9–6–0** |
| Montreal | 2–1 | 0–3 | 2–1 | 3–0 | 2–1 | **9–6–0** |
| Quebec | 2–1 | 1–2 | 2–1 | 1–1–1 | 1–2 | **7–7–1** |

== Schedule and results ==
1985–86 regular season
October

| Game | Result | Date | Score | Opponent | Record |
|---|---|---|---|---|---|
| 1 | W | October 10, 1985 | 5–3 | @ Pittsburgh Penguins | 1–0–0 |
| 2 | W | October 12, 1985 | 6–3 | Chicago Black Hawks | 2–0–0 |
| 3 | L | October 13, 1985 | 2–7 | @ Boston Bruins | 2–1–0 |
| 4 | L | October 16, 1985 | 0–6 | Buffalo Sabres | 2–2–0 |
| 5 | L | October 19, 1985 | 6–11 | @ Hartford Whalers | 2–3–0 |
| 6 | L | October 21, 1985 | 2–3 | Quebec Nordiques | 2–4–0 |
| 7 | W | October 23, 1985 | 5–4 | @ Buffalo Sabres | 3–4–0 |
| 8 | W | October 26, 1985 | 5–3 | Hartford Whalers | 4–4–0 |
| 9 | L | October 29, 1985 | 4–6 | @ Quebec Nordiques | 4–5–0 |
| 10 | L | October 30, 1985 | 4–5 | Philadelphia Flyers | 4–6–0 |

November

| Game | Result | Date | Score | Opponent | Record |
|---|---|---|---|---|---|
| 11 | T | November 2, 1985 | 4–4 OT | Pittsburgh Penguins | 4–6–1 |
| 12 | W | November 5, 1985 | 8–3 | @ Hartford Whalers | 5–6–1 |
| 13 | T | November 6, 1985 | 3–3 OT | @ Minnesota North Stars | 5–6–2 |
| 14 | W | November 9, 1985 | 6–0 | @ Los Angeles Kings | 6–6–2 |
| 15 | W | November 12, 1985 | 3–2 | @ New York Islanders | 7–6–2 |
| 16 | L | November 13, 1985 | 2–5 | @ New York Rangers | 7–7–2 |
| 17 | T | November 16, 1985 | 2–2 OT | New York Rangers | 7–7–3 |
| 18 | W | November 18, 1985 | 6–2 | Boston Bruins | 8–7–3 |
| 19 | L | November 20, 1985 | 4–5 OT | Edmonton Oilers | 8–8–3 |
| 20 | W | November 23, 1985 | 4–3 | Calgary Flames | 9–8–3 |
| 21 | L | November 27, 1985 | 3–5 | @ Washington Capitals | 9–9–3 |
| 22 | W | November 29, 1985 | 5–2 | @ Buffalo Sabres | 10–9–3 |
| 23 | W | November 30, 1985 | 10–1 | Detroit Red Wings | 11–9–3 |

December

| Game | Result | Date | Score | Opponent | Record |
|---|---|---|---|---|---|
| 24 | W | December 2, 1985 | 7–0 | Vancouver Canucks | 12–9–3 |
| 25 | L | December 5, 1985 | 6–8 | @ Boston Bruins | 12–10–3 |
| 26 | W | December 7, 1985 | 6–3 | @ Toronto Maple Leafs | 13–10–3 |
| 27 | W | December 11, 1985 | 3–1 | @ Hartford Whalers | 14–10–3 |
| 28 | L | December 12, 1985 | 3–6 | @ Philadelphia Flyers | 14–11–3 |
| 29 | W | December 14, 1985 | 6–3 | Chicago Black Hawks | 15–11–3 |
| 30 | T | December 16, 1985 | 4–4 OT | Hartford Whalers | 15–11–4 |
| 31 | W | December 18, 1985 | 3–2 | Quebec Nordiques | 16–11–4 |
| 32 | L | December 19, 1985 | 4–5 OT | @ Quebec Nordiques | 16–12–4 |
| 33 | W | December 21, 1985 | 3–1 | Buffalo Sabres | 17–12–4 |
| 34 | W | December 27, 1985 | 7–3 | @ New Jersey Devils | 18–12–4 |
| 35 | W | December 28, 1985 | 8–3 | New Jersey Devils | 19–12–4 |

January

| Game | Result | Date | Score | Opponent | Record |
|---|---|---|---|---|---|
| 36 | L | January 1, 1986 | 2–3 | @ Toronto Maple Leafs | 19–13–4 |
| 37 | W | January 3, 1986 | 7–3 | @ Winnipeg Jets | 20–13–4 |
| 38 | W | January 4, 1986 | 6–5 | @ Calgary Flames | 21–13–4 |
| 39 | W | January 6, 1986 | 9–2 | St. Louis Blues | 22–13–4 |
| 40 | W | January 8, 1986 | 5–3 | Boston Bruins | 23–13–4 |
| 41 | L | January 10, 1986 | 4–6 | @ New York Rangers | 23–14–4 |
| 42 | L | January 11, 1986 | 3–6 | Edmonton Oilers | 23–15–4 |
| 43 | W | January 15, 1986 | 4–0 | Winnipeg Jets | 24–15–4 |
| 44 | L | January 17, 1986 | 4–5 OT | @ Buffalo Sabres | 24–16–4 |
| 45 | W | January 18, 1986 | 3–0 | New York Islanders | 25–16–4 |
| 46 | L | January 20, 1986 | 2–3 OT | @ Quebec Nordiques | 25–17–4 |
| 47 | T | January 22, 1986 | 3–3 OT | @ Chicago Black Hawks | 25–17–5 |
| 48 | W | January 23, 1986 | 5–2 | @ Minnesota North Stars | 26–17–5 |
| 49 | W | January 25, 1986 | 3–2 OT | Toronto Maple Leafs | 27–17–5 |
| 50 | W | January 27, 1986 | 4–1 | Buffalo Sabres | 28–17–5 |
| 51 | W | January 29, 1986 | 5–3 | Quebec Nordiques | 29–17–5 |

February

| Game | Result | Date | Score | Opponent | Record |
|---|---|---|---|---|---|
| 52 | W | February 1, 1986 | 2–1 | Boston Bruins | 30–17–5 |
| 53 | L | February 5, 1986 | 2–3 | @ Quebec Nordiques | 30–18–5 |
| 54 | L | February 7, 1986 | 2–3 | @ Washington Capitals | 30–19–5 |
| 55 | W | February 8, 1986 | 5–3 | @ Detroit Red Wings | 31–19–5 |
| 56 | L | February 10, 1986 | 3–4 OT | Minnesota North Stars | 31–20–5 |
| 57 | L | February 13, 1986 | 3–4 | @ New Jersey Devils | 31–21–5 |
| 58 | W | February 15, 1986 | 5–3 | Philadelphia Flyers | 32–21–5 |
| 59 | L | February 17, 1986 | 2–3 OT | Los Angeles Kings | 32–22–5 |
| 60 | T | February 19, 1986 | 4–4 OT | Washington Capitals | 32–22–6 |
| 61 | W | February 22, 1986 | 6–3 | Hartford Whalers | 33–22–6 |
| 62 | L | February 24, 1986 | 2–3 | @ Edmonton Oilers | 33–23–6 |
| 63 | W | February 26, 1986 | 4–2 | @ Vancouver Canucks | 34–23–6 |

March

| Game | Result | Date | Score | Opponent | Record |
|---|---|---|---|---|---|
| 64 | W | March 1, 1986 | 6–4 | @ Los Angeles Kings | 35–23–6 |
| 65 | L | March 4, 1986 | 3–6 | @ New York Islanders | 35–24–6 |
| 66 | L | March 6, 1986 | 4–7 | St. Louis Blues | 35–25–6 |
| 67 | W | March 8, 1986 | 8–3 | Boston Bruins | 36–25–6 |
| 68 | L | March 10, 1986 | 2–5 | Hartford Whalers | 36–26–6 |
| 69 | W | March 12, 1986 | 3–2 | Vancouver Canucks | 37–26–6 |
| 70 | L | March 13, 1986 | 2–3 | @ Boston Bruins | 37–27–6 |
| 71 | L | March 15, 1986 | 3–5 | Calgary Flames | 37–28–6 |
| 72 | L | March 17, 1986 | 6–8 | Quebec Nordiques | 37–29–6 |
| 73 | L | March 19, 1986 | 4–6 | @ Winnipeg Jets | 37–30–6 |
| 74 | L | March 22, 1986 | 2–3 | @ St. Louis Blues | 37–31–6 |
| 75 | L | March 26, 1986 | 0–3 | @ Hartford Whalers | 37–32–6 |
| 76 | T | March 27, 1986 | 3–3 OT | @ Boston Bruins | 37–32–7 |
| 77 | W | March 29, 1986 | 4–3 | Pittsburgh Penguins | 38–32–7 |

April

| Game | Result | Date | Score | Opponent | Record |
|---|---|---|---|---|---|
| 78 | W | April 2, 1986 | 6–3 | Detroit Red Wings | 39–32–7 |
| 79 | L | April 4, 1986 | 2–4 | @ Buffalo Sabres | 39–33–7 |
| 80 | W | April 5, 1986 | 4–2 | Buffalo Sabres | 40–33–7 |

Legend: Win (2 points) Loss (0 points) Tie (1 point)

== Player statistics ==
=== Regular season ===
==== Scoring ====
| Player | Pos | GP | G | A | Pts | PIM | +/- | PPG | SHG | GWG |
|---|---|---|---|---|---|---|---|---|---|---|
| Mats Naslund | LW | 80 | 43 | 67 | 110 | 16 | 11 | 19 | 0 | 7 |
| Bobby Smith | C | 79 | 31 | 55 | 86 | 55 | 10 | 5 | 0 | 7 |
| Larry Robinson | D | 78 | 19 | 63 | 82 | 39 | 29 | 10 | 0 | 1 |
| Kjell Dahlin | RW | 77 | 32 | 39 | 71 | 4 | 10 | 14 | 0 | 3 |
| Guy Carbonneau | C | 80 | 20 | 36 | 56 | 57 | 18 | 1 | 2 | 3 |
| Ryan Walter | C/LW | 69 | 15 | 34 | 49 | 45 | -9 | 9 | 0 | 1 |
| Bob Gainey | LW | 80 | 20 | 23 | 43 | 20 | 10 | 0 | 2 | 4 |
| Mike McPhee | LW | 70 | 19 | 21 | 40 | 69 | 8 | 0 | 2 | 3 |
| Mario Tremblay | RW | 56 | 19 | 20 | 39 | 55 | 4 | 3 | 0 | 3 |
| Stephane Richer | RW | 65 | 21 | 16 | 37 | 50 | 1 | 5 | 0 | 2 |
| Chris Nilan | RW | 72 | 19 | 15 | 34 | 274 | 10 | 2 | 0 | 1 |
| Chris Chelios | D | 41 | 8 | 26 | 34 | 67 | 4 | 2 | 0 | 0 |
| Lucien DeBlois | C | 61 | 14 | 17 | 31 | 48 | 3 | 2 | 0 | 1 |
| Tom Kurvers | D | 62 | 7 | 23 | 30 | 36 | 9 | 3 | 0 | 1 |
| Gaston Gingras | D | 34 | 8 | 18 | 26 | 12 | -10 | 7 | 0 | 0 |
| Brian Skrudland | C | 65 | 9 | 13 | 22 | 57 | 3 | 0 | 2 | 0 |
| Petr Svoboda | D | 73 | 1 | 18 | 19 | 93 | 24 | 0 | 0 | 0 |
| Sergio Momesso | LW | 24 | 8 | 7 | 15 | 46 | -4 | 3 | 0 | 3 |
| Mike Lalor | D | 62 | 3 | 5 | 8 | 56 | -4 | 0 | 0 | 0 |
| Randy Bucyk | C | 17 | 4 | 2 | 6 | 8 | 5 | 0 | 0 | 0 |
| Craig Ludwig | D | 69 | 2 | 4 | 6 | 63 | 7 | 0 | 0 | 0 |
| Rick Green | D | 46 | 3 | 2 | 5 | 20 | -9 | 0 | 0 | 0 |
| Steve Rooney | LW | 38 | 2 | 3 | 5 | 114 | -4 | 1 | 0 | 0 |
| Serge Boisvert | RW | 9 | 2 | 2 | 4 | 2 | 1 | 0 | 0 | 0 |
| Claude Lemieux | RW | 10 | 1 | 2 | 3 | 22 | -6 | 1 | 0 | 0 |
| Patrick Roy | G | 47 | 0 | 3 | 3 | 4 | 0 | 0 | 0 | 0 |
| John Kordic | RW | 5 | 0 | 1 | 1 | 12 | 1 | 0 | 0 | 0 |
| Dominic Campedelli | D | 2 | 0 | 0 | 0 | 0 | -2 | 0 | 0 | 0 |
| Kent Carlson | D | 2 | 0 | 0 | 0 | 0 | 0 | 0 | 0 | 0 |
| Shayne Corson | LW | 3 | 0 | 0 | 0 | 2 | -3 | 0 | 0 | 0 |
| David Maley | LW | 3 | 0 | 0 | 0 | 0 | 0 | 0 | 0 | 0 |
| Steve Penney | G | 18 | 0 | 0 | 0 | 0 | 0 | 0 | 0 | 0 |
| Doug Soetaert | G | 23 | 0 | 0 | 0 | 6 | 0 | 0 | 0 | 0 |
| Alfie Turcotte | C | 2 | 0 | 0 | 0 | 2 | 0 | 0 | 0 | 0 |

==== Goaltending ====
| Player | MIN | GP | W | L | T | GA | GAA | SO | SA | SV | SV% |
|---|---|---|---|---|---|---|---|---|---|---|---|
| Patrick Roy | 2651 | 47 | 23 | 18 | 3 | 148 | 3.35 | 1 | 1185 | 1037 | .875 |
| Doug Soetaert | 1215 | 23 | 11 | 7 | 2 | 56 | 2.77 | 3 | 533 | 477 | .895 |
| Steve Penney | 990 | 18 | 6 | 8 | 2 | 72 | 4.36 | 0 | 447 | 375 | .839 |
| Team: | 4856 | 80 | 40 | 33 | 7 | 276 | 3.41 | 4 | 2165 | 1889 | .873 |

=== Playoffs ===
==== Scoring ====
| Player | Pos | GP | G | A | Pts | PIM | PPG | SHG | GWG |
|---|---|---|---|---|---|---|---|---|---|
| Mats Naslund | LW | 20 | 8 | 11 | 19 | 4 | 4 | 0 | 0 |
| Claude Lemieux | RW | 20 | 10 | 6 | 16 | 68 | 4 | 0 | 4 |
| Bobby Smith | C | 20 | 7 | 8 | 15 | 22 | 3 | 0 | 3 |
| Larry Robinson | D | 20 | 0 | 13 | 13 | 22 | 0 | 0 | 0 |
| Guy Carbonneau | C | 20 | 7 | 5 | 12 | 35 | 0 | 2 | 1 |
| Chris Chelios | D | 20 | 2 | 9 | 11 | 49 | 1 | 0 | 0 |
| Bob Gainey | LW | 20 | 5 | 5 | 10 | 12 | 0 | 1 | 3 |
| Mike McPhee | LW | 20 | 3 | 4 | 7 | 45 | 0 | 1 | 1 |
| Brian Skrudland | C | 20 | 2 | 4 | 6 | 76 | 0 | 0 | 1 |
| Stephane Richer | RW | 16 | 4 | 1 | 5 | 23 | 3 | 0 | 1 |
| Kjell Dahlin | RW | 16 | 2 | 3 | 5 | 4 | 0 | 0 | 0 |
| Gaston Gingras | D | 11 | 2 | 3 | 5 | 4 | 1 | 0 | 0 |
| Rick Green | D | 18 | 1 | 4 | 5 | 8 | 0 | 0 | 0 |
| David Maley | LW | 7 | 1 | 3 | 4 | 2 | 0 | 0 | 0 |
| Mike Lalor | D | 17 | 1 | 2 | 3 | 29 | 0 | 0 | 1 |
| Chris Nilan | RW | 18 | 1 | 2 | 3 | 141 | 1 | 0 | 0 |
| Serge Boisvert | RW | 8 | 0 | 1 | 1 | 0 | 0 | 0 | 0 |
| Craig Ludwig | D | 20 | 0 | 1 | 1 | 48 | 0 | 0 | 0 |
| Ryan Walter | C/LW | 5 | 0 | 1 | 1 | 2 | 0 | 0 | 0 |
| Randy Bucyk | C | 2 | 0 | 0 | 0 | 0 | 0 | 0 | 0 |
| Lucien DeBlois | C | 11 | 0 | 0 | 0 | 7 | 0 | 0 | 0 |
| John Kordic | RW | 18 | 0 | 0 | 0 | 53 | 0 | 0 | 0 |
| Patrick Roy | G | 20 | 0 | 0 | 0 | 10 | 0 | 0 | 0 |
| Petr Svoboda | D | 8 | 0 | 0 | 0 | 21 | 0 | 0 | 0 |

==== Goaltending ====
| Player | MIN | GP | W | L | GA | GAA | SO | SA | SV | SV% |
|---|---|---|---|---|---|---|---|---|---|---|
| Patrick Roy | 1218 | 20 | 15 | 5 | 39 | 1.92 | 1 | 506 | 467 | .923 |
| Team: | 1218 | 20 | 15 | 5 | 39 | 1.92 | 1 | 506 | 467 | .923 |

Note:

Pos = Position;GP = Games played; G = Goals; A = Assists; Pts = Points; PIM = Penalty minutes; +/- = Plus/minus; PPG = Power-play goals; SHG = Short-handed goals; GWG = Game-winning goals
Pos = Position;GP = Games played; Min, TOI = Minutes played; W = Wins; L = Losses; T,T/OT = Ties; OTL = Overtime losses; GA = Goals-against; GAA = Goals-against average; SO = Shutouts; SA = Shots against; SV = Shots saved;SV% = Save percentage;

== Playoffs ==
=== Stanley Cup ===
==== Calgary Flames vs. Montreal Canadiens ====
| Date | Visitors | Score | Home | Score | Notes |
|---|---|---|---|---|---|
| May 16 | Montreal | 2 | Calgary | 5 | |
| May 18 | Montreal | 3 | Calgary | 2 | OT |
| May 20 | Calgary | 3 | Montreal | 5 | |
| May 22 | Calgary | 0 | Montreal | 1 | |
| May 24 | Montreal | 4 | Calgary | 3 | |

Montreal wins the series 4–1.

== Awards and records ==
- Kjell Dahlin, rookie scoring leader, 71 points
- Kjell Dahlin, NHL All-Rookie Team
- Mats Naslund, NHL Second Team All-Star
- Patrick Roy, Conn Smythe Trophy
- Patrick Roy, NHL All-Rookie Team

== Transactions ==
=== 1986 Montreal Canadiens Stanley Cup Champions ===
Bob Gainey, Doug Soetaert, Patrick Roy, Rick Green, David Maley, Ryan Walter, Serge Boisvert, Mario Tremblay, Bobby Smith, Craig Ludwig, Tom Kurvers, Kjell Dahlin, Larry Robinson, Guy Carbonneau, Chris Chelios, Petr Svoboda, Mats Naslund, Lucien DeBlois, Steve Rooney, Gaston Gingras, Mike Lalor, Chris Nilan, John Kordic, Claude Lemieux, Mike McPhee, Brian Skrudland, Stephane Richer, Serge Savard (general manager), Jean Perron (coach), Jacques Laperriere (assistant coach), Eddy Palchak (trainer).

== Draft picks ==
Montreal's draft picks at the 1985 NHL entry draft held at the Metro Toronto Convention Centre in Toronto.

| Round | # | Player | Nationality | College/junior/club team |
|---|---|---|---|---|
| 1 | 12 | Jose Charbonneau (RW) | Canada | Drummondville Voltigeurs (QMJHL) |
| 1 | 16 | Tom Chorske (LW) | United States | Minneapolis Southwest H.S. |
| 2 | 33 | Todd Richards (D) | United States | Plymouth Armstrong High School (USHS-MN) |
| 3 | 47 | Rocky Dundas (RW) | Canada | Kelowna Wings (WHL) |
| 4 | 75 | Martin Desjardins (C) | Canada | Trois-Rivières Draveurs (QMJHL) |
| 4 | 79 | Brent Gilchrist (C) | Canada | Kelowna Wings (WHL) |
| 5 | 96 | Tom Sagissor (C) | United States | Hastings High School (USHS-MN) |
| 6 | 117 | Donald Dufresne (D) | Canada | Trois-Rivières Draveurs (QMJHL) |
| 7 | 142 | Ed Cristofoli (RW) | Canada | Penticton Knights (BCJHL) |
| 8 | 163 | Mike Claringbull (D) | Canada | Medicine Hat Tigers (WHL) |
| 9 | 184 | Roger Beedon (G) | Canada | Sarnia Legionnaires (OPJHL) |
| 10 | 198 | Maurizio Mansi (F) | Canada | Rensselaer Polytechnic Institute (ECAC) |
| 10 | 205 | Chad Arthur (LW) | United States | Stratford Cullitons (OPJHL) |
| 11 | 226 | Mike Bishop (D) | Canada | Sarnia Legionnaires (OPJHL) |
| 12 | 247 | John Ferguson Jr. (LW) | Canada | Winnipeg South Blues (MJHL) |

== See also ==
- 1985–86 NHL season
