= Gaston Gingras =

Canadian ice hockey player

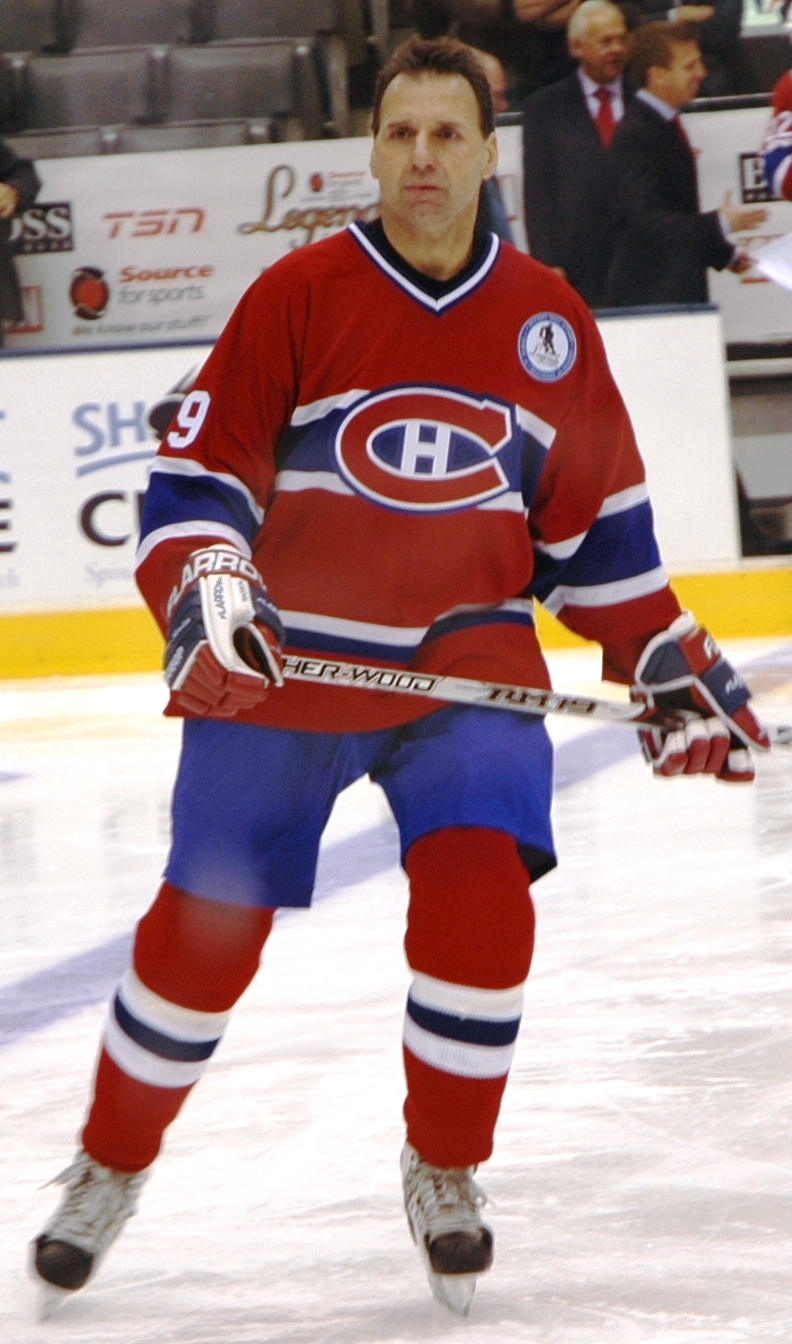
- Born: February 13, 1959 (age 67) Témiscaming, Quebec, Canada
- Height: 6 ft 0 in (183 cm)
- Weight: 190 lb (86 kg; 13 st 8 lb)
- Position: Defence
- Shot: Left
- Played for: Birmingham Bulls (WHA); Montreal Canadiens; Toronto Maple Leafs; St. Louis Blues
- NHL draft: 27th overall, 1979; Montreal Canadiens
- Playing career: 1979–1996

Gaston Reginald Gingras (born February 13, 1959) is a Canadian former professional ice hockey defenceman who played one season in the World Hockey Association (WHA) and ten seasons in the National Hockey League from 1978 to 1989. He won the 1986 Stanley Cup with the Montreal Canadiens.

== Career ==
Born and raised in Temiscaming, Quebec, Gingras did not start playing hockey until the age of seven, when he convinced his mother that if his best buddy could play then he would play too, and she got the necessary equipment for both boys.

In 1974, he played for the North Bay Trappers of the Ontario Provincial Junior A Hockey League and then with the Kitchener Rangers of the Ontario Hockey League, followed by the Hamilton Fincups also of the OHL. He then joined the World Hockey Association for the 1978/79 season with the Birmingham Bulls.

Gingras spent one season in Birmingham, joining Michel Goulet, Rick Vaive, Craig Hartsburg, Rob Ramage, Pat Riggin and Keith Crowder, all of whom were underage players too young to be eligible for the NHL Draft under the rules at the time. After the 1978–79 season, the WHA merged with the NHL. Included in the merger were New England (Hartford), Quebec, Winnipeg, and Edmonton. Birmingham and Cincinnati were not brought under the auspices of the NHL and subsequently disbanded, and their underage players were all declared eligible for the upcoming draft.

In the 1979 NHL entry draft, Gingras was drafted by the Montreal Canadiens. Although he was not picked until the second round, and was 27th overall, he was Montreal's first pick, ahead of other players such as Mats Näslund, Guy Carbonneau and Rick Wamsley. Playing first with the Nova Scotia Voyageurs of the American Hockey League, he joined the Canadiens in the 1979–80 NHL season. Gingras played four seasons at the Montreal Forum, alongside players such as Larry Robinson, Bob Gainey, Guy Lafleur and Steve Shutt. Possessing a fierce slap shot, he often played 'the point' on the Habs power play.

On December 17, 1982, Gingras was traded to the rival Toronto Maple Leafs alongside Dan Daoust in exchange for future considerations (later determined to be a second-round pick in 1986 for Gingras, and a third-round pick in the 1984 draft for Daoust). He would spend 2½ seasons in Toronto.

In the middle of the 1984–85 season, he was sent by the Leafs down to the AHL where he played for the St. Catharines Saints. He was then traded to the Sherbrooke Canadiens, Montreal's farm team. During this time another highlight of Gingras career emerged. Along with other notables, such as Patrick Roy, Stéphane Richer, Brian Skrudland and Ric Nattress, they won the Calder Cup.

For the 1985–86 season, he returned to the Montreal Canadiens and was part of their Stanley Cup winning team that beat the Calgary Flames four games to one.

In the 1987–88 season, he played two games for the Canadiens before moving to the St. Louis Blues for almost two seasons. Near the end of the 1988–89 season he moved to Switzerland to play for EHC Biel followed by Hockey Club Lugano in the Italian part of Switzerland.

He then moved on to play for HC Gherdëina in Italy before returning to Canada to play for the Fredericton Canadiens where he was a player/coach until he retired. He returned to play a few games with the Chesapeake Icebreakers of the ECHL in their final season.

In his NHL career, Gingras played 476 games scored 61 goals and 174 assists for a total of 235 points while collecting 161 penalty minutes in the regular season. In the playoffs he scored 6 goals and 18 assists for 24 points in 52 games and collected 20 penalty minutes.

== Personal life ==
Although retired, Gingras still plays with the NHL Old Timers. He runs clinics to help youth players to become better players and holds one every Sunday in Dollard-des-Ormeaux, Quebec. In 2007, he went to Salluit, Nunavik to help younger Inuit develop their hockey skills. He also trains children for the Montreal Canadiens Hockey School in the Complexe Sportif Bell in Brossard, Montreal.

Gaston Gingras is the father of Sebastien Gingras, a defenseman and member of the 2014 Union College National Division I Men's Hockey Championship Team. He is the uncle of former figure skater Jennifer Robinson.

== Career statistics ==
=== Regular season and playoffs ===
			Regular season					Playoffs
Season	Team	League	GP	G	A	Pts	PIM	GP	G	A	Pts	PIM
1974–75	North Bay Trappers	OPJHL	41	11	27	38	74	—	—	—	—	—
1975–76	Kitchener Rangers	OMJHL	66	13	31	44	94	8	3	3	6	7
1976–77	Kitchener Rangers	OMJHL	59	13	62	75	134	3	0	1	1	6
1977–78	Kitchener Rangers	OMJHL	32	13	24	37	31	—	—	—	—	—
1977–78	Hamilton Fincups	OMJHL	29	11	19	30	37	15	3	11	14	13
1978–79	Birmingham Bulls	WHA	60	13	21	34	35	—	—	—	—	—
1979–80	Nova Scotia Voyageurs	AHL	30	11	27	38	17	—	—	—	—	—
1979–80	Montreal Canadiens	NHL	34	3	7	10	18	10	1	6	7	8
1980–81	Montreal Canadiens	NHL	55	5	16	21	22	1	1	0	1	0
1981–82	Montreal Canadiens	NHL	34	6	18	24	28	5	0	1	1	0
1982–83	Montreal Canadiens	NHL	22	1	8	9	8	—	—	—	—	—
1982–83	Toronto Maple Leafs	NHL	45	10	18	28	10	3	1	2	3	2
1983–84	Toronto Maple Leafs	NHL	59	7	20	27	16	—	—	—	—	—
1984–85	Toronto Maple Leafs	NHL	5	0	2	2	0	—	—	—	—	—
1984–85	St. Catharines Saints	AHL	36	7	12	19	13	—	—	—	—	—
1984–85	Sherbrooke Canadiens	AHL	21	3	14	17	6	17	5	4	9	4
1985–86	Sherbrooke Canadiens	AHL	42	11	20	31	14	—	—	—	—	—
1985–86	Montreal Canadiens	NHL	34	8	18	26	12	11	2	3	5	4
1986–87	Montreal Canadiens	NHL	66	11	34	45	21	5	0	2	2	0
1987–88	Montreal Canadiens	NHL	2	0	1	1	2	—	—	—	—	—
1987–88	St. Louis Blues	NHL	68	7	22	29	18	10	1	3	4	4
1988–89	St. Louis Blues	NHL	52	3	10	13	6	7	0	1	1	2
1989–90	EHC Biel	NLA	36	17	23	40	20	6	3	3	6	2
1990–91	EHC Biel	NLA	13	1	6	7	13	—	—	—	—	—
1991–92	HC Lugano	NLA	36	10	19	29	20	2	0	0	0	0
1992–93	HC Gherdëina	ITA	19	3	24	27	16	3	1	3	4	4
1992–93	HC Gherdëina	ALP	30	10	19	29	28	—	—	—	—	—
1993–94	HC Gherdëina	ITA	21	3	14	17	14	2	0	0	0	0
1993–94	HC Gherdëina	ALP	27	5	15	20	6	—	—	—	—	—
1994–95	Fredericton Canadiens	AHL	19	3	6	9	4	17	2	12	14	8
1995–96	Fredericton Canadiens	AHL	39	2	21	23	18	—	—	—	—	—
1998–99	Chesapeake Icebreakers	ECHL	5	0	4	4	6	—	—	—	—	—
WHA totals			60	13	21	34	35	—	—	—	—	—
NHL totals			476	61	174	235	161	52	6	18	24	20
