= 1986 Stanley Cup Final =

1986 ice hockey championship series

	1	2	3	4	5	Total
Montreal Canadiens	2	3*	5	1	4	4
Calgary Flames	5	2*	3	0	3	1
- * – Denotes overtime period(s)
- Location(s): Calgary: Olympic Saddledome (1, 2, 5); Montreal: Montreal Forum (3, 4)
- Coaches: Montreal: Jean Perron; Calgary: Bob Johnson
- Captains: Montreal: Bob Gainey; Calgary: Lanny McDonald, Jim Peplinski, Doug Risebrough
- Referees: Kerry Fraser, Don Koharski, Andy Van Hellemond
- Dates: May 16–24, 1986
- MVP: Patrick Roy (Canadiens)
- Series-winning goal: Bobby Smith (10:30, third)
- Hall of Famers: Canadiens: Guy Carbonneau (2019); Chris Chelios (2013); Bob Gainey (1992); Larry Robinson (1995); Patrick Roy (2006); Flames: Brett Hull (2009); Al MacInnis (2007); Lanny McDonald (1992); Joe Mullen (2000); Mike Vernon (2023); Coaches: Bob Johnson (1992); Officials: John D'Amico (1993); Ray Scapinello (2008); Andy Van Hellemond (1999)
- Networks: Canada: (English): CTV (1–2), CBC (3–5) (French): SRC; United States: (English): ESPN
- Announcers: (CTV) Dan Kelly, Ron Reusch, and Brad Park (CBC) Bob Cole (3–4), Don Wittman (5), Dick Irvin Jr., Mickey Redmond (3–4) and John Davidson (SRC) Richard Garneau, Gilles Tremblay, and Mario Tremblay (ESPN) Sam Rosen (1–2), Ken Wilson (3–5), Mickey Redmond (1–2, 5), Bill Clement (3–4)

The 1986 Stanley Cup Final was the championship series of the National Hockey League's (NHL) 1985–86 season, and the culmination of the 1986 Stanley Cup playoffs. It was contested between the Campbell Conference champion Calgary Flames and the Wales Conference champion Montreal Canadiens. The Canadiens won the best-of-seven series in five games to win their 23rd Stanley Cup, and their 17th in their last 18 Finals appearances dating back to 1956. With their 23rd championship, the Canadiens surpassed the New York Yankees to become the team with the most championships in North American sports, a distinction that they held until 1999 when the Yankees overtook them.

It was the first all-Canadian Finals since Montreal lost to the Toronto Maple Leafs in 1967, the last year of the Original Six era. This was the fifth of nine consecutive Finals contested by a team from Western Canada, the fourth of eight contested by a team from Alberta (the Edmonton Oilers appeared in six, the Flames in two, the Vancouver Canucks in one), and the third of five consecutive finals to end with the Cup presentation on Alberta ice (the Oilers won four, the Canadiens one). This was the only time between 1980 and 1988 that neither the Oilers (four wins) nor the New York Islanders (four wins) won the Stanley Cup.

Although this was the first ever postseason meeting between the two teams, it was not the first Montreal–Calgary Finals. The first Finals between teams from Montreal and Calgary took place in 1924 when the Canadiens defeated the Western Canada Hockey League champion Calgary Tigers. The Canadiens and Flames met again in a rematch in 1989, with Calgary winning in six games.

The Finals reverted to the 2–2–1–1–1 format after implementing the 2–3–2 format in 1984.

== Paths to the Finals ==
Calgary defeated the Winnipeg Jets 3–0, the defending champion and in-province rival Edmonton Oilers 4–3, and the St. Louis Blues 4–3 to advance to the final.

Montreal defeated rival Boston Bruins 3–0, the Hartford Whalers 4–3, and the New York Rangers 4–1 to make it to the final.

== Game summaries ==
=== Game one ===
May 16	Montreal Canadiens	2–5	Calgary Flames	Olympic Saddledome	Recap

In game one, Jim Peplinski recorded three points, and Mike Vernon held strong in net for Calgary, making 22 saves in a 5–2 victory over Montreal to take a 1–0 series lead.

Scoring summary
Period	Team	Goal	Assist(s)	Time	Score
1st	MTL	Mats Naslund (6) – pp	Bobby Smith (7) and Larry Robinson (11)	06:04	1–0 MTL
1st	CGY	John Tonelli (6)	Al MacInnis (12) and Dan Quinn (4)	12:08	1–1
1st	CGY	Jim Peplinski (5)	Paul Baxter (1) and Joel Otto (8)	19:11	2–1 CGY
2nd	None				
3rd	CGY	Dan Quinn (8) – sh	Unassisted	02:14	3–1 CGY
3rd	CGY	Lanny McDonald (10)	Nick Fotiu (1) and Jim Peplinski (7)	03:33	4–1 CGY
3rd	MTL	Chris Chelios (2)	David Maley (2) and Mats Naslund (8)	17:56	4–2 CGY
3rd	CGY	Doug Risebrough (8) – en	Jim Peplinski (8)	19:35	5–2 CGY
Penalty summary
Period	Team	Player	Penalty	Time	PIM
1st	CGY	Robin Bartel	Misconduct	03:35	10:00
1st	MTL	Mike McPhee	Hooking	03:35	2:00
1st	CGY	Joe Mullen	Interference	04:14	2:00
1st	CGY	Paul Baxter	Charging	10:16	2:00
1st	MTL	Larry Robinson	Holding	11:57	2:00
1st	CGY	Lanny McDonald	Roughing	15:10	2:00
1st	MTL	Craig Ludwig	Elbowing	15:10	2:00
1st	CGY	Tim Hunter	Roughing	17:36	2:00
1st	MTL	Chris Nilan	Roughing	17:36	2:00
1st	MTL	Patrick Roy	Misconduct	19:11	10:00
2nd	CGY	Hakan Loob	Roughing	02:51	2:00
2nd	MTL	Bobby Smith	Roughing	02:51	2:00
2nd	CGY	Tim Hunter	High-sticking	04:57	2:00
2nd	CGY	Nick Fotiu	Interference	09:54	2:00
2nd	CGY	Jamie Macoun	Roughing	18:03	2:00
2nd	MTL	David Maley	Roughing	18:03	2:00
2nd	CGY	Tim Hunter	Fighting – major	20:00	5:00
2nd	CGY	Tim Hunter	Misconduct	20:00	10:00
2nd	CGY	Jim Peplinski	Roughing	20:00	2:00
2nd	MTL	Craig Ludwig	Roughing	20:00	2:00
2nd	MTL	Chris Nilan	Fighting – major	20:00	5:00
2nd	MTL	Chris Nilan	Misconduct	20:00	10:00
3rd	CGY	Steve Bozek	Cross-checking	01:04	2:00
3rd	CGY	Paul Reinhart	Roughing	03:43	2:00
3rd	MTL	Guy Carbonneau	Roughing	03:43	2:00
3rd	CGY	Jim Peplinski	Holding	06:16	2:00
3rd	MTL	Brian Skrudland	Tripping	14:43	2:00

Shots by period
Team	1	2	3	Total
Montreal	10	9	5	24
Calgary	13	7	10	30

=== Game two ===
May 18	Montreal Canadiens	3–2	Calgary Flames	Olympic Saddledome	Recap

After Calgary took a 2–0 lead in game two, Montreal tied the game early in the third period, and Brian Skrudland scored the game–winning goal just nine seconds into overtime to tie the series for Montreal.

Scoring summary
Period	Team	Goal	Assist(s)	Time	Score
1st	CGY	John Tonelli (7)	Joe Mullen (7) and Dan Quinn (5)	09:06	1–0 CGY
2nd	CGY	Paul Reinhart (5)	Lanny McDonald (7) and Hakan Loob (9)	00:15	2–0 CGY
2nd	MTL	Gaston Gingras (1)	Unassisted	03:45	2–1 CGY
3rd	MTL	David Maley (1)	Guy Carbonneau (3) and Chris Chelios (7)	03:30	2–2
OT	MTL	Brian Skrudland (1)	Mike McPhee (3) and Mike Lalor (1)	00:09	3–2 MTL
Penalty summary
Period	Team	Player	Penalty	Time	PIM
1st	CGY	Al MacInnis	Holding	02:22	2:00
1st	MTL	Mike McPhee	Misconduct	06:08	10:00
1st	CGY	Jamie Macoun	Roughing	09:19	2:00
1st	MTL	Brian Skrudland	Elbowing	09:19	2:00
1st	CGY	Tim Hunter	Fighting – major	10:25	2:00
1st	CGY	Jim Peplinski	Roughing	10:25	2:00
1st	MTL	Chris Nilan	Fighting – major	10:25	5:00
1st	MTL	Bob Gainey	Roughing	10:25	2:00
1st	MTL	Brian Skrudland	High-sticking	15:47	2:00
1st	MTL	Guy Carbonneau	Roughing	16:12	2:00
1st	MTL	Bobby Smith	Interference	19:21	2:00
2nd	CGY	Joel Otto	Interference	01:07	2:00
2nd	MTL	Craig Ludwig	Holding	04:41	2:00
2nd	CGY	Neil Sheehy	Cross-checking	11:31	2:00
2nd	CGY	Al MacInnis	Hooking	17:01	2:00
3rd	MTL	Craig Ludwig	Holding	01:11	2:00
3rd	CGY	Joe Mullen	Tripping	08:24	2:00
3rd	CGY	Neil Sheehy	Misconduct	10:50	10:00
3rd	MTL	John Kordic	Misconduct	10:50	10:00
3rd	CGY	Jim Peplinski	Roughing	18:30	2:00
3rd	MTL	Guy Carbonneau	Roughing	18:30	2:00
OT	None				

Shots by period
Team	1	2	3	OT	Total
Montreal	14	12	8	1	35
Calgary	8	9	5	0	22

=== Game three ===
May 20	Calgary Flames	3–5	Montreal Canadiens	Montreal Forum	Recap

The Canadiens scored four goals in the first period of game three, with Mats Naslund scoring twice, including the game winner. The game also saw multiple fights and misconducts, and both clubs accumulated for a total of 126 penalty minutes. The Canadiens went on to win the game 5–3, giving them a 2–1 lead in the series.

Scoring summary
Period	Team	Goal	Assist(s)	Time	Score
1st	CGY	Joe Mullen (11) – pp	Joel Otto (9) and Hakan Loob (10)	05:45	1–0 CGY
1st	MTL	Mats Naslund (7)	Larry Robinson (9) and Bobby Smith (8)	06:50	1–1
1st	CGY	Joel Otto (5) – pp	Al MacInnis (13) and Paul Reinhart (13) (13)	17:59	2–1 CGY
1st	MTL	Bobby Smith (6)	Larry Robinson (13) and Mats Naslund (9)	18:25	2–2
1st	MTL	Mats Naslund (8) – pp	Ryan Walter (1) and Chris Chelios (8)	19:17	3–2 MTL
1st	MTL	Bob Gainey (5)	Guy Carbonneau (4) and Chris Chelios (9)	19:33	4–2 MTL
2nd	CGY	Lanny McDonald (11) – pp	Dan Quinn (6) and Al MacInnis (14)	07:13	4–3 MTL
2nd	MTL	Kjell Dahlin (2)	Gaston Gingras (3) and Guy Carbonneau (5)	19:22	5–3 MTL
3rd	None				
Penalty summary
Period	Team	Player	Penalty	Time	PIM
1st	MTL	Craig Ludwig	High-sticking	02:18	2:00
1st	MTL	Mike Lalor	Roughing	04:21	10:00
1st	CGY	Terry Johnson	Misconduct	06:32	10:00
1st	CGY	Dan Quinn	Hooking	07:30	2:00
1st	MTL	Guy Carbonneau	Roughing	11:20	2:00
1st	CGY	Dan Quinn	Roughing	13:04	2:00
1st	MTL	Brian Skrudland	Roughing	13:04	2:00
1st	MTL	Claude Lemieux	Roughing	16:41	2:00
1st	CGY	Robin Bartel	Holding	19:09	2:00
1st	MTL	Neil Sheehy	Fighting – major	19:39	5:00
1st	CGY	Neil Sheehy	Misconduct	19:39	10:00
1st	CGY	Lanny McDonald	High-sticking	19:39	2:00
1st	CGY	Jim Peplinski	Charging	19:39	2:00
1st	MTL	Craig Ludwig	Holding	19:39	2:00
1st	MTL	Chris Nilan	Fighting – major	19:39	5:00
1st	MTL	Chris Nilan	Misconduct	19:39	10:00
2nd	MTL	Brian Skrudland	High-sticking	05:35	2:00
2nd	CGY	Tim Hunter	Fighting – major	08:02	5:00
2nd	MTL	John Kordic	Fighting – major	08:02	5:00
2nd	CGY	Jim Peplinski	High-sticking	09:04	2:00
2nd	CGY	Al MacInnis	Roughing	17:53	2:00
2nd	MTL	Ryan Walter	Roughing	17:53	2:00
2nd	CGY	Tim Hunter	Roughing	18:32	2:00
2nd	CGY	Tim Hunter	Misconduct	18:32	10:00
2nd	CGY	Joel Otto	Misconduct	18:32	10:00
2nd	MTL	Chris Nilan	Roughing	18:32	2:00
2nd	MTL	Chris Nilan	Misconduct	18:32	10:00
2nd	MTL	Brian Skrudland	Misconduct	18:32	10:00
3rd	CGY	Al MacInnis	High-sticking	17:11	2:00

Shots by period
Team	1	2	3	Total
Calgary	10	9	7	26
Montreal	16	8	5	29

=== Game four ===
May 22	Calgary Flames	0–1	Montreal Canadiens	Montreal Forum	Recap

Game four remained scoreless until Claude Lemieux scored with 9:50 remaining in regulation, and Patrick Roy stopped all 15 shots he faced to record his first career playoff shutout, giving the Canadiens a 1–0 victory, and a commanding 3–1 series lead. The game ended in a bench-clearing brawl, during which Claude Lemieux bit the finger of Jim Peplinski. In response, Peplinski said following the incident, "I didn't know they allowed cannibalism in the NHL." Both teams combined for a total of 176 penalty minutes; the most combined penalty minutes ever recorded in a Stanley Cup Final game.

Scoring summary
Period	Team	Goal	Assist(s)	Time	Score
1st	None				
2nd	None				
3rd	MTL	Claude Lemieux (10)	Unassisted	09:50	1–0 MTL
Penalty summary
Period	Team	Player	Penalty	Time	PIM
1st	CGY	Terry Johnson	Roughing	01:31	2:00
1st	MTL	Chris Chelios	Roughing	01:31	2:00
1st	MTL	Mike McPhee	Roughing	01:31	2:00
1st	CGY	Perry Berezan	Hooking	06:13	2:00
1st	CGY	Neil Sheehy	Roughing – double minor	08:25	4:00
1st	MTL	Bobby Smith	Roughing – double minor	08:25	4:00
1st	CGY	Perry Berezan	Slashing	19:34	2:00
1st	MTL	Claude Lemieux	Slashing	19:34	2:00
2nd	CGY	Steve Bozek	Holding	07:55	2:00
2nd	CGY	Mike Eaves	Holding	15:23	2:00
3rd	MTL	Mike McPhee	Misconduct	17:38	10:00
3rd	CGY	Steve Bozek	Fighting – major	20:00	5:00
3rd	CGY	Steve Bozek	Misconduct	20:00	10:00
3rd	CGY	John Tonelli	Fighting – major	20:00	5:00
3rd	CGY	John Tonelli	Game misconduct	20:00	10:00
3rd	CGY	Paul Baxter	Fighting – major	20:00	5:00
3rd	CGY	Paul Baxter	Game misconduct	20:00	10:00
3rd	CGY	Jim Peplinski	Fighting – major	20:00	5:00
3rd	CGY	Jim Peplinski	Misconduct	20:00	10:00
3rd	CGY	Jim Peplinski	Game misconduct	20:00	10:00
3rd	CGY	Doug Risebrough	High-sticking	20:00	2:00
3rd	MTL	Guy Carbonneau	Fighting – major	20:00	5:00
3rd	MTL	Guy Carbonneau	Game misconduct	20:00	10:00
3rd	MTL	Chris Chelios	Fighting – major	20:00	5:00
3rd	MTL	Chris Chelios	Game misconduct	20:00	10:00
3rd	MTL	Mike Lalor	Fighting – major	20:00	5:00
3rd	MTL	Mike Lalor	Game misconduct	20:00	10:00
3rd	MTL	Claude Lemieux	Fighting – major	20:00	5:00
3rd	MTL	Claude Lemieux	Misconduct	20:00	10:00
3rd	MTL	Claude Lemieux	Game misconduct	20:00	10:00

Shots by period
Team	1	2	3	Total
Calgary	7	2	6	15
Montreal	6	8	10	24

=== Game five ===
May 24	Montreal Canadiens	4–3	Calgary Flames	Olympic Saddledome	Recap

In game five, Montreal defeated Calgary at the Olympic Saddledome by a score of 4-3 to clinch the series 4-1, winning their 23rd Stanley Cup. Patrick Roy, who made 30 saves in the victory, was awarded the Conn Smythe Trophy as playoffs MVP. At just 20 years old, Roy became the youngest player in NHL history to receive the award.

Scoring summary
Period	Team	Goal	Assist(s)	Time	Score
1st	MTL	Gaston Gingras (2) – pp	Claude Lemieux (5) and Mats Naslund (10)	06:53	1–0 MTL
2nd	CGY	Steve Bozek (1)	Tim Hunter (3) and Jim Peplinski (9)	07:17	1–1
2nd	MTL	Brian Skrudland (2)	Mike McPhee (4) and Claude Lemieux (6)	10:49	2–1 MTL
3rd	MTL	Rick Green (1)	David Maley (3) and Mike Lalor (2)	10:11	3–1 MTL
3rd	MTL	Bobby Smith (7)	Mats Naslund (11)	10:30	4–1 MTL
3rd	CGY	Steve Bozek (2)	Jamie Macoun (6)	16:46	4–2 MTL
3rd	CGY	Joe Mullen (12)	Dan Quinn (7) and Al MacInnis (15)	19:14	4–3 MTL
Penalty summary
Period	Team	Player	Penalty	Time	PIM
1st	CGY	Nick Fotiu	Roughing	02:43	2:00
1st	CGY	Lanny McDonald	Hooking	05:53	2:00
1st	MTL	Brian Skrudland	High-sticking	07:15	2:00
1st	CGY	Doug Risebrough	Misconduct	15:21	10:00
1st	MTL	Brian Skrudland	Misconduct	15:21	10:00
1st	CGY	Nick Fotiu	Slashing	18:26	2:00
2nd	MTL	Mike Lalor	Roughing	01:28	2:00
2nd	MTL	Chris Chelios	Slashing	03:26	2:00
2nd	CGY	Nick Fotiu	High-sticking	14:40	2:00
3rd	CGY	Nick Fotiu	Roughing	06:31	2:00
3rd	MTL	Craig Ludwig	Roughing	06:31	2:00
3rd	CGY	Tim Hunter	High-sticking	13:01	2:00
3rd	MTL	Claude Lemieux	Interference	15:21	2:00

Shots by period
Team	1	2	3	Total
Montreal	12	10	11	33
Calgary	7	12	14	33

== Team rosters ==
Years indicated in boldface under the "Finals appearance" column signify that the player won the Stanley Cup in the given year.

=== Calgary Flames ===
#	Nat	Player	Position	Hand	Acquired	Place of birth	Finals appearance
15	(Canada)	Robin Bartel	D	L	1985–86	Drake, Saskatchewan	first
4	(Canada)	Paul Baxter	D	R	1983–84	Winnipeg, Manitoba	first
21	(Canada)	Perry Berezan	C	R	1983	Edmonton, Alberta	first
26	(Canada)	Steve Bozek	LW	L	1983–84	Kelowna, British Columbia	first
14	(Canada)	Brian Bradley	C	R	1983	Kitchener, Ontario	first
25	(Canada)	Yves Courteau	RW	R	1982–83	Montreal	first
17	(United States)	Mike Eaves	C	R	1983–84	Denver, Colorado	first
22	(United States)	Nick Fotiu	LW	L	1985–86	Staten Island, New York	second (1979)
16	(United States)	Brett Hull	RW	R	1984	Belleville, Ontario	first
19	(Canada)	Tim Hunter	RW	R	1979	Calgary, Alberta	first
6	(Canada)	Terry Johnson	D	L	1985–86	Calgary, Alberta	first
31	(Canada)	Rejean Lemelin	G	L	1978–79	Quebec City, Quebec	first
12	(Sweden)	Hakan Loob	RW	R	1980	Visby, Sweden	first
2	(Canada)	Al MacInnis	D	R	1981	Inverness, Nova Scotia	first
34	(Canada)	Jamie Macoun	D	L	1982–83	Newmarket, Ontario	first
9	(Canada)	Lanny McDonald – **C**	RW	R	1981–82	Hanna, Alberta	first
7	(United States)	Joe Mullen	RW	R	1985–86	New York	first
29	(United States)	Joel Otto	C	R	1984–85	Elk River, Minnesota	first
11	(Canada)	Colin Patterson	LW	R	1983–84	Rexdale, Ontario	first
24	(Canada)	Jim Peplinski – **C**	RW	R	1979	Renfrew, Ontario	first
10	(Canada)	Dan Quinn	C	L	1983	Ottawa, Ontario	first
23	(Canada)	Paul Reinhart	D	L	1979	Kitchener, Ontario	first
8	(Canada)	Doug Risebrough – **C**	C	L	1982–83	Guelph, Ontario	fifth (**1976**, **1977**, **1978**, **1979**)
10	(Canada)	Gary Roberts	LW	L	1984	North York, Ontario	first
5	(United States)	Neil Sheehy	D	R	1983–84	Fort Frances, Ontario	first
20	(United States)	Gary Suter	D	L	1984	Madison, Wisconsin	first
27	(Canada)	John Tonelli	LW	L	1985–86	Hamilton, Ontario	sixth (**1980**, **1981**, **1982**, **1983**, 1984)
30	(Canada)	Mike Vernon	G	L	1981	Calgary, Alberta	first
33	(Canada)	Carey Wilson	C	R	1983–84	Winnipeg, Manitoba	first

=== Montreal Canadiens ===
#	Nat	Player	Position	Hand	Acquired	Place of birth	Finals appearance
12	(Canada)	Serge Boisvert	RW	R	1984–85	Drummondville, Quebec	first
21	(Canada)	Guy Carbonneau	C	R	1979	Sept-Îles, Quebec	first
24	(United States)	Chris Chelios	D	R	1981	Chicago	first
20	(Sweden)	Kjell Dahlin	RW	L	1981	Timrå, Sweden	first
27	(Canada)	Lucien DeBlois	RW	R	1984–85	Joliette, Quebec	second (1979)
23	(Canada)	Bob Gainey – **C**	LW	L	1973	Peterborough, Ontario	fifth (**1976**, **1977**, **1978**, **1979**)
29	(Canada)	Gaston Gingras	D	L	1979	Témiscaming, Quebec	first
5	(Canada)	Rick Green	D	L	1982–83	Belleville, Ontario	first
31	(Canada)	John Kordic	RW	R	1983	Edmonton, Alberta	first
18	(United States)	Tom Kurvers	D	L	1981	Minneapolis, Minnesota	first
38	(United States)	Mike Lalor	D	L	1985–86	Buffalo, New York	first
32	(Canada)	Claude Lemieux	RW	R	1983	Buckingham, Quebec	first
17	(United States)	Craig Ludwig	D	L	1980	Rhinelander, Wisconsin	first
8	(United States)	David Maley	LW	L	1982	Beaver Dam, Wisconsin	first
35	(Canada)	Mike McPhee	LW	L	1980	Sydney, Nova Scotia	first
26	(Sweden)	Mats Naslund – **A**	LW	L	1979	Timrå, Sweden	first
30	(United States)	Chris Nilan	RW	R	1978	Boston, Massachusetts	first
44	(Canada)	Stephane Richer	RW	R	1984	Ripon, Quebec	first
19	(Canada)	Larry Robinson – **A**	D	L	1971	Winchester, Ontario	sixth (**1973**, **1976**, **1977**, **1978**, **1979**)
28	(United States)	Steve Rooney	LW	L	1981	Canton, Massachusetts	first
33	(Canada)	Patrick Roy	G	L	1984	Quebec City, Quebec	first
39	(Canada)	Brian Skrudland	C	L	1985–86	Peace River, Alberta	first
15	(Canada)	Bobby Smith	C	L	1983–84	North Sydney, Nova Scotia	second (1981)
1	(Canada)	Doug Soetaert	G	L	1984–85	Edmonton, Alberta	first
25	(Czechoslovakia)	Petr Svoboda	D	L	1984	Most, Czechoslovakia	first
14	(Canada)	Mario Tremblay – **A**	RW	R	1974	Alma, Quebec	fifth (**1976**, **1977**, **1978**, **1979**)
11	(Canada)	Ryan Walter	LW	L	1982–83	New Westminster, British Columbia	first

== Stanley Cup engraving ==
The 1986 Stanley Cup was presented to Canadiens captain Bob Gainey by NHL President John Ziegler following the Canadiens 4–3 win over the Flames in game five.

The following Canadiens players and staff had their names engraved on the Stanley Cup

1985–86 Montreal Canadiens

=== Players ===
Centres

- 15 Bobby Smith
- 21 Guy Carbonneau
- 27 Lucien DeBlois
- 35 Mike McPhee
- 39 Brian Skrudland*

Wingers

- 8 David Maley
- 11 Ryan Walter
- 12 Serge Boisvert*
- 14 Mario Tremblay (A)
- 20 Kjell Dahlin
- 23 Bob Gainey (Captain)
- 26 Mats Naslund (A)
- 28 Steve Rooney
- 30 Chris Nilan
- 32 Claude Lemieux
- 44 Stephane Richer*

Defencemen

- 5 Rick Green
- 17 Craig Ludwig
- 18 Tom Kurvers
- 19 Larry Robinson (A)
- 24 Chris Chelios
- 25 Petr Svoboda
- 29 Gaston Gingras*
- 31 John Kordic*
- 38 Mike Lalor*

Goaltenders

- 1 Doug Soetaert
- 33 Patrick Roy*
- * Won the Calder Cup as American Hockey League (AHL) Championship in 1985 with Sherbrooke Canadiens.

=== Coaching and administrative staff ===
- Ronald Corey (President), Serge Savard* (Vice President/General Manager)
- Jean Perron (Head Coach), Jacques Laperriere (Ass't Coach)
- Jean Beliveau (Sr. Vice President-Director of Cooperate Affairs), François-Xavier Seigneur (Vice President-Marketing), Fred Steer(Vice President-Finance-Administration)
- Jacques Lemaire (Ass't General Manager/director of player personnel), Andre Boudrias (Ass't General Manager/Director of Scouting), Claude Ruel (Director of Player Development)
- Yvon Belanger (Athletic Therapist), Gaetan Lefebvre (Ass't Athletic Therapist)
- Eddy Palchak (Trainer), Sylvain Toupin (Ass't Trainer)

=== Stanley Cup engraving ===
- Tom Kurvers missed the end of the regular season and all of the playoffs injured. His name was included on the Stanley Cup because he played 62 regular-season games for Montreal.
- Mario Tremblay played only 56 regular-season games. He missed the rest of the season and all the playoffs due to injury. Tremblay still played enough games to qualify for his name to be on the Stanley Cup.
- Four names were not engraved on the Stanley Cup but were included in the team picture. #37 Steve Penney was dressed for 30 games and played 18. #36 Sergio Momesso played 24 regular-season games. Both players missed the rest of the season injured. They were not given an injury exemption and were included on the Stanley Cup.
- #22 Randy Bucyk played 17 regular-season games and two playoff games, and did not play in the Final. He did not qualify to appear on the Stanley Cup.
- Morgan McCammon was included on the Cup with Montreal in 1979 as a Director. It is a tradition that the name of the Chairman of the Board is engraved on the Stanley Cup, but Montreal did not submit McCammon's for engraving on the Stanley Cup, but gave him a second Stanley Cup ring.
- Sr. Vice President of Operations Gerry Gundman was also left off the Stanley Cup.
- Starting in the 1985–86 season, each NHL team was required to list two alternate captains (along with the team captain) for each game. Some teams may have more than two alternates, but only two can be marked with an 'A' per game.
- The Montreal Canadiens played 10 rookies on their squad during the Playoffs: Stephane Richer, Brian Skrudland, Mike Lalor, Patrick Roy, Steve Rooney, John Kordic, Claude Lemieux, David Maley, Kjell Dahlin and Randy Bucyk. Three other rookies played in the regular season but not during the Playoffs: Sergio Momesso, Shayne Corson and Dominic Campedelli. In addition, the Canadiens only made 1 trade from Kent Carlson (played 2 games for Montreal) to St. Louis for Graham Herring (never played in the NHL), and 5th round pic on January 31, 1986. All other teams' lineup changes were through their minor league team, AHL Sherbrooke Canadiens.
- Serge Boisvert, Randy Bucyk, Gaston Gingras, John Kordic, Mike Lalor, Stephane Richer, Brian Skrudland, Patrick Roy, and Serge Savard (Manager) won the Calder Cup with the Sherbrooke Canadiens in 1985 and the Stanley Cup with the Montreal Canadiens in 1986. Ric Nattress also won the Calder Cup in 1985. He would win the Stanley Cup with the Calgary Flames in 1989.
- Jean Perron was the 12th NHL rookie coach to win the Stanley Cup. Perron was also the last rookie coach to win the Stanley Cup, who coached the winning team for the whole season. (See 2009 Stanley Cup Final for the last rookie coach to win the Stanley Cup.)

== Riot ==
Some 5,000 jubilant Montreal fans celebrating the Canadiens' Stanley Cup win over the Calgary Flames rampaged through the city's downtown, causing over CA$1 million worth of damage.

== Broadcasting ==
In Canada, this was the second and final year that the English-language rights of the Cup Finals were shared between CBC and CTV. For games one and two, CBC only had the rights to air them locally in Montreal and Calgary, while CTV broadcast them to the rest of the country. CBC then had the exclusive rights to televise games three, four, and five nationally. Had the series gone to a seventh game, then both CBC and CTV would have simultaneously televised it while using their separate production facilities and crews. After the season, CTV pulled the plug on their two-year-long venture with the NHL, and their rights package was eventually given to the Global-Canwest consortium.

This was the first of three consecutive seasons that ESPN televised the Stanley Cup Final in the United States.

== See also ==
- List of Stanley Cup champions
- 1985–86 NHL season

Preceded by Edmonton Oilers; 1985	Montreal Canadiens; Stanley Cup champions 1986	Succeeded by Edmonton Oilers; 1987
