= Robin Bartel =

Canadian ice hockey player

- Born: May 16, 1961 (age 65) Drake, Saskatchewan, Canada
- Height: 6 ft 0 in (183 cm)
- Weight: 200 lb (91 kg; 14 st 4 lb)
- Position: Defence
- Shot: Left
- Played for: Calgary Flames; Vancouver Canucks
- National team: Canada
- NHL draft: Undrafted
- Playing career: 1984–1989

Robin Dale Bartel (born May 16, 1961) is a Canadian former professional ice hockey defenceman who played in the National Hockey League during the mid-1980s. He appeared in 41 NHL games, recording an assist and 14 penalty minutes. Before making his NHL debut Bartel played for the Canadian national team at the 1984 Winter Olympics.

== Playing career ==
Bartel played three seasons of Junior hockey with the Prince Albert Raiders spanning 1979–1982, winning two national championships in his final two years. A stay-at-home defender, Bartel played at the University of Saskatchewan and won a CIAU National Championship, now known as the David Johnston University Cup, before joining the Canadian National Team for the 1983–84 season and representing Canada at the 1984 Winter Olympics. Never drafted, Bartel signed with the Calgary Flames and spent two seasons in their organization, appearing in a single regular season NHL game for the Flames in 1985–86 and six playoff games, including the 1986 Stanley Cup Final.

Bartel signed as a free agent with the Vancouver Canucks for the 1986–87 season and stuck with the team as a depth defender, appearing in 40 games and recording a single assist. However, he would lose his spot the following year and spend the entire season in the minors.

After another stint with the Canadian National Team and a year in Britain, Bartel retired in 1990. He played two games in the American Hockey League with the St. John's Maple Leafs during the 1993–94 AHL season.

== Career statistics ==
=== Regular season and playoffs ===
			Regular season					Playoffs
Season	Team	League	GP	G	A	Pts	PIM	GP	G	A	Pts	PIM
1979–80	Prince Albert Raiders	SJHL	60	6	31	37	151	—	—	—	—	—
1980–81	Prince Albert Raiders	SJHL	60	11	41	52	165	26	11	22	33	—
1981–82	Prince Albert Raiders	SJHL	56	12	45	57	166	23	5	28	33	—
1982–83	University of Saskatchewan	CWUAA	24	4	14	18	36	—	—	—	—	—
1983–84	Canadian National Team	Intl	61	4	7	11	54	—	—	—	—	—
1984–85	EHC Wetzikon	SUI.2	14	3	3	6	—	—	—	—	—	—
1984–85	Moncton Golden Flames	AHL	41	4	11	15	66	—	—	—	—	—
1985–86	Calgary Flames	NHL	1	0	0	0	0	6	0	0	0	16
1985–86	Moncton Golden Flames	AHL	74	4	21	25	100	3	0	0	0	0
1986–87	Vancouver Canucks	NHL	40	0	1	1	14	—	—	—	—	—
1986–87	Fredericton Express	AHL	10	0	2	2	15	—	—	—	—	—
1987–88	Fredericton Express	AHL	37	1	10	11	54	3	0	0	0	0
1988–89	Moncton Hawks	AHL	23	0	4	4	19	10	0	1	1	18
1988–89	Milwaukee Admirals	IHL	26	1	5	6	59	—	—	—	—	—
1989–90	Medway Bears	GBR.2	16	8	19	27	32	—	—	—	—	—
1989–90	Canadian National Team	Intl	23	1	1	2	10	—	—	—	—	—
1993–94	St. John's Maple Leafs	AHL	2	0	0	0	2	—	—	—	—	—
AHL totals			187	9	48	57	256	16	0	1	1	27
NHL totals			41	0	1	1	14	6	0	0	0	16

=== International ===
Year	Team	Event	GP	G	A	Pts	PIM
1984	Canada	OG	6	0	1	1	4
Senior totals			6	0	1	1	4
