= Drake, Saskatchewan =

Village in Saskatchewan, Canada

Drake
- Village
- Village of Drake
- Location of Drake Drake (Canada)
- Coordinates: 51°44′50″N 105°00′41″W
- Country: Canada
- Province: Saskatchewan
- Region: Central
- Census division: 11
- Rural Municipality: Usborne No. 310

Government
  - Type: Municipal
  - Governing body: Drake Village Council
  - Mayor: Peter Nicholson
  - Administrator: Stuart Jantz

Area
  - Total: 0.72 km^{2} (0.28 sq mi)

Population (2016)
  - Total: 197
  - Density: 275.2/km^{2} (713/sq mi)
- Time zone: UTC−06:00 (CST)
- Postal code: S0K 1H0
- Area code: 306
- Highways: Highway 20
- Railways: Canadian Pacific Railway

Drake (2016 population: 197) is a village in the Canadian province of Saskatchewan within the Rural Municipality of Usborne No. 310 and Census Division No. 11. The village lies west of Highway 20, approximately 11 kilometres (6.8 mi) south of its intersection with the Yellowhead Highway.

== History ==
Drake incorporated as a village on September 19, 1910.

== Demographics ==
Population history (1981–2016)
| Year | Pop. | ±% |
|---|---|---|
| 1981 | 211 | — |
| 1986 | 229 | +8.5% |
| 1991 | 243 | +6.1% |
| 1996 | 247 | +1.6% |
| 2001 | 248 | +0.4% |
| 2006 | 232 | −6.5% |
| 2011 | 202 | −12.9% |
| 2016 | 197 | −2.5% |
| 2021 | 197 | +0.0% |
Source: Statistics Canada via Saskatchewan Bureau of Statistics

In the 2021 Census of Population conducted by Statistics Canada, Drake had a population of 197 living in 91 of its 103 total private dwellings, no change from its 2016 population of 197. With a land area of 0.64 km^{2} (0.25 sq mi), it had a population density of 307.8/km^{2} (797.2/sq mi) in 2021.

In the 2016 Census of Population, the Village of Drake recorded a population of 197 living in 94 of its 102 total private dwellings, a −2.5% change from its 2011 population of 202. With a land area of 0.72 km^{2} (0.28 sq mi), it had a population density of 273.6/km^{2} (708.6/sq mi) in 2016.

== Economy ==
Drake is mostly a farming community, supported by the crops and livestock of the surrounding farms. However, two successful large-scale businesses, Drake Meat Processors and Bergen Industries, were founded in and operate from the village, keeping it from becoming a loose connection of farms.

== Education ==
The local school, Drake Elementary School, is used by elementary-aged students from Drake (as well as surrounding areas without their own school, such as Lockwood). After Grade 8, students go to the nearby Lanigan Central High School to complete their secondary education. Despite decreasing enrollment, DES finds strong support in the community; however, recent changes to the school division structuring across Saskatchewan have left its long-term future in doubt.

== Sports ==
Drake is home to the 2023 Senior Hockey Saskatchewan Provincial A champions, the Drake Canucks.

== Notable people ==
- Robin Bartel, former National Hockey League player

== See also ==
- List of communities in Saskatchewan
- List of villages in Saskatchewan
