= Stéphane Richer =

Canadian ice hockey player

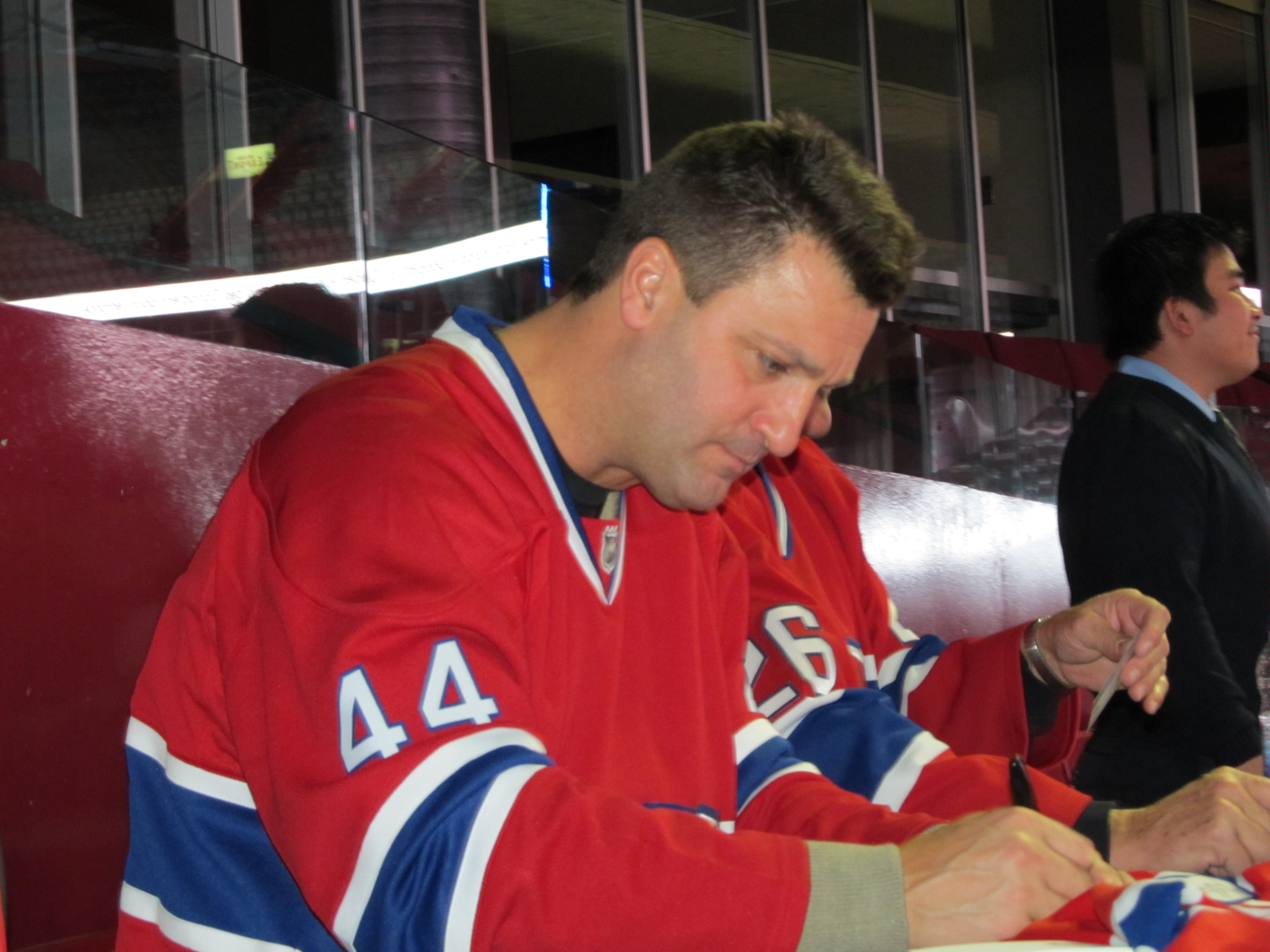
- Richer in 2010
- Born: June 7, 1966 (age 60) Ripon, Quebec, Canada
- Height: 6 ft 2 in (188 cm)
- Weight: 218 lb (99 kg; 15 st 8 lb)
- Position: Right wing
- Shot: Right
- Played for: Montreal Canadiens; New Jersey Devils; Tampa Bay Lightning; St. Louis Blues; Pittsburgh Penguins
- NHL draft: 29th overall, 1984; Montreal Canadiens
- Playing career: 1984–2005

Stéphane Joseph Jean-Jacques Richer (French pronunciation: [stefan ʁiʃe]; born June 7, 1966) is a Canadian former professional ice hockey right winger.

== Playing career ==
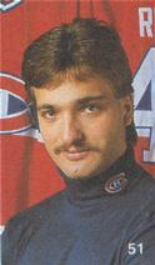
1987 sticker of Richer for Montreal Canadiens

Richer was drafted 29th overall by the Montreal Canadiens in the 1984 NHL entry draft. He played in 1,054 career NHL games, scoring 421 goals and 398 assists for 819 points. Richer won the Calder Cup in 1985. He won the Stanley Cup with the Montreal Canadiens in 1986; Richer scored four goals and one assist in the 16 games in which he participated that playoff season.

Montreal traded Stephane Richer and Tom Chorske to the New Jersey Devils in exchange for Kirk Muller and Roland Melanson on September 20, 1991. Richer won the Stanley Cup with the New Jersey Devils in 1995; Richer scored six goals and 15 assists in the 19 games that he played in during that playoff season. The ensuing year after winning the Cup, New Jersey missed the playoffs, and the New Jersey Devils traded Richer to Montreal for Lyle Odelein on August 22, 1996. Montreal traded Richer, Darcy Tucker, and David Wilkie to the Tampa Bay Lightning in exchange for Igor Ulanov, Patrick Poulin, and Mick Vukota on January 15, 1998.

Richer also played for the St. Louis Blues, the Pittsburgh Penguins, and a second stint in New Jersey before retiring.

Richer is among the all-time leaders (tied in fourth with six other players) in playoff overtime goals, with four:

- April 8, 1989 – At 5:01 of overtime, the Canadiens defeat the Hartford Whalers in game three of the Adams Division Semifinals
- April 19, 1991 – A mere 27 seconds into overtime, Richer ends game two of the Adams Division Finals with a 4–3 win over the Boston Bruins.
- May 7, 1994 – At 14:19 of overtime, game four of the Eastern Conference Semifinals ends with a 5–4 Devils victory over the Bruins.
- May 15, 1994 – game one of the Eastern Conference Final concludes with a 4–3 New Jersey win over the New York Rangers at 15:23 of the second overtime.

Richer scored 50 goals for the Montreal Canadiens in 1987–88 and 51 in 1989–90, joining Guy Lafleur as the only Canadiens players to score 50 or more goals during a season more than once in their career (Lafleur scored 50 or more goals in a season six times). Richer was the last player to score 50 or more goals during a season for the Montreal Canadiens until Cole Caufield in 2025–26.

== Playing style ==
Richer was known to have one of the hardest shots in the NHL during his playing days, coupled with an extremely quick release. Unlike many other players, Richer only had to wind up his stick to about waist height to achieve full power on his shot. Recognition of his hard shot was noticed even more when Fleer trading cards included Richer in their "Slapshot Artists" limited set for the 1994–95 season. During the 1994 New Jersey Devils team-only skills competition prior to the All-Star Game, Richer recorded multiple slapshots that exceeded the 100 mph mark.

In a well documented legend, during one pre-game warm up session in New Jersey, Richer fired a slapshot at his own goalie, Martin Brodeur, which shattered the cup in Brodeur's jock strap, leaving him bruised and nauseated. Brodeur had to leave the ice and change equipment moments before the game started.

A fast skater with a big body (approx. 6'3", 225 lbs.), Richer used skill and his shot to beat opponents as opposed to a hard-hitting power forward style which was prototypical of an NHL player of his proportions.

Scouting reports frequently criticized Richer for not squeezing more production out of his talent, given his physical gifts (size, skill, skating ability). He was sometimes described as "coasting" during the regular season and playing hard only when the playoffs began, although his statistics do not support this perception (his career regular-season points per game of 0.78 is higher than his 0.73 average in the playoffs).

== Retirement ==
In October 2009, Richer began competing as a pairs figure skater on the CBC Television reality show Battle of the Blades with Marie-France Dubreuil.

== Personal life and mental health struggles ==
Following his retirement, Richer and his wife Lisa moved to Naples, Florida. He later disclosed that he had been battling clinical depression during the majority of his career. After winning the 1995 Stanley Cup with New Jersey, he attempted to commit suicide while driving his car. On February 8, 2012, Richer appeared along with Darryl Strawberry on a documentary by Michael Landsberg to talk about his past battle with depression.

== Records and achievements ==
- Youngest Montreal Canadiens player to score 50 goals in a season- 21 years old
- Youngest Montreal Canadiens player to score 100 goals in his career- 22 years, 205 days
- One of only two Montreal Canadiens players to have two 50 goal seasons with the team (Guy Lafleur did it six times)
- 2x Stanley Cup Champion (1986 and 1995)

== Career statistics ==
=== Regular season and playoffs ===
			Regular season					Playoffs
Season	Team	League	GP	G	A	Pts	PIM	GP	G	A	Pts	PIM
1982–83	Laval Insulaires	QMAAA	48	47	54	101	86	—	—	—	—	—
1983–84	Granby Bisons	QMJHL	67	39	37	76	62	3	1	1	2	4
1984–85	Granby Bisons	QMJHL	30	30	27	57	31	—	—	—	—	—
1984–85	Chicoutimi Saguenéens	QMJHL	27	31	32	63	40	12	13	13	26	25
1984–85	Montreal Canadiens	NHL	1	0	0	0	0	—	—	—	—	—
1984–85	Sherbrooke Canadiens	AHL	—	—	—	—	—	9	3	6	9	10
1985–86	Montreal Canadiens	NHL	65	21	16	37	50	16	4	1	5	23
1986–87	Sherbrooke Canadiens	AHL	12	10	4	14	11	—	—	—	—	—
1986–87	Montreal Canadiens	NHL	57	20	19	39	80	5	3	2	5	0
1987–88	Montreal Canadiens	NHL	72	50	28	78	72	8	7	5	12	6
1988–89	Montreal Canadiens	NHL	68	25	35	60	61	21	6	5	11	14
1989–90	Montreal Canadiens	NHL	75	51	40	91	46	9	7	3	10	2
1990–91	Montreal Canadiens	NHL	75	31	30	61	53	13	9	5	14	6
1991–92	New Jersey Devils	NHL	74	29	35	64	25	7	1	2	3	0
1992–93	New Jersey Devils	NHL	78	38	35	73	44	5	2	2	4	2
1993–94	New Jersey Devils	NHL	80	36	36	72	16	20	7	5	12	6
1994–95	New Jersey Devils	NHL	45	23	16	39	10	19	6	15	21	2
1995–96	New Jersey Devils	NHL	73	20	12	32	30	—	—	—	—	—
1996–97	Montreal Canadiens	NHL	63	22	24	46	32	5	0	0	0	0
1997–98	Montreal Canadiens	NHL	14	5	4	9	5	—	—	—	—	—
1997–98	Tampa Bay Lightning	NHL	26	9	11	20	36	—	—	—	—	—
1998–99	Tampa Bay Lightning	NHL	64	12	21	33	22	—	—	—	—	—
1999–2000	Tampa Bay Lightning	NHL	20	7	5	12	4	—	—	—	—	—
1999–2000	Detroit Vipers	IHL	2	0	0	0	0	—	—	—	—	—
1999–2000	St. Louis Blues	NHL	36	8	17	25	14	3	1	0	1	0
2001–02	Pittsburgh Penguins	NHL	58	13	12	25	14	—	—	—	—	—
2001–02	New Jersey Devils	NHL	10	1	2	3	0	3	0	0	0	0
2004–05	Sorel-Tracy Mission	LNAH	8	2	6	8	0	—	—	—	—	—
NHL totals			1,054	421	398	819	614	134	53	45	98	61

=== International ===
Medal record

Men's ice hockey

Representing Canada

World Junior Championships
Gold medal – first place	1985 Finland	Ice hockey

Year	Team	Event	Result	GP	G	A	Pts	PIM
1985	Canada	WJC	1st place, gold medalist(s)	7	4	3	7	2
Junior totals				7	4	3	7	2

== See also ==
- List of NHL players with 50-goal seasons
- List of NHL players with 1,000 games played
