= John Kordic =

Canadian ice hockey player (1965–1992)

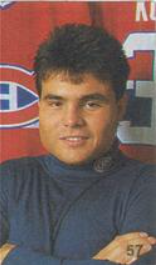
- Kordic in 1987
- Born: March 22, 1965 Edmonton, Alberta, Canada
- Died: August 8, 1992 (aged 27) L'Ancienne-Lorette, Quebec, Canada
- Height: 6 ft 2 in (188 cm)
- Weight: 220 lb (100 kg; 15 st 10 lb)
- Position: Right wing
- Shot: Right
- Played for: Montreal Canadiens; Toronto Maple Leafs; Washington Capitals; Quebec Nordiques
- NHL draft: 78th overall, 1983; Montreal Canadiens
- Playing career: 1985–1992

John Nicholas Kordic (March 22, 1965 – August 8, 1992) was a Canadian ice hockey player in the National Hockey League.

== Hockey career ==
Kordic played for the Montreal Canadiens, Toronto Maple Leafs, Washington Capitals and Quebec Nordiques, for a total of seven seasons in the NHL. He won the Memorial Cup with the Portland Winter Hawks in 1983, the Calder Cup with the Sherbrooke Canadiens in 1985, and a Stanley Cup with the Montreal Canadiens in 1986. While playing for the Toronto Maple Leafs, he wore No. 27, formerly worn by Leaf players Darryl Sittler and Frank Mahovlich. Kordic was known as an enforcer on the ice.

In 1992, he moved back to Quebec after finishing the season with the Cape Breton Oilers, the top farm team of the Edmonton Oilers, and expressed hope that he could turn his life around if he could catch on with his hometown team.

== Personal life ==
Kordic was of Croatian heritage. At the time of Kordic's death he was engaged to marry a former exotic dancer named Nancy Masse, who used to work at a Quebec club called Le Folichon, less than a kilometre from where he died. Kordic's brother, Dan, played for the Philadelphia Flyers organization in the 1990s.

== Death ==
On August 8, 1992, after overdosing on drugs and being involved in a struggle with police at Motel Maxim in L'Ancienne-Lorette, Quebec, Kordic died of lung failure due to heart malfunction.

== Career statistics ==
=== Regular season and playoffs ===
			Regular season					Playoffs
Season	Team	League	GP	G	A	Pts	PIM	GP	G	A	Pts	PIM
1982–83	Portland Winter Hawks	WHL	72	3	22	25	235	14	1	6	7	30
1983–84	Portland Winter Hawks	WHL	67	9	50	59	232	14	0	3	3	56
1984–85	Sherbrooke Canadiens	AHL	4	0	0	0	4	4	0	0	0	11
1984–85	Portland Winter Hawks	WHL	25	6	22	28	73	—	—	—	—	—
1984–85	Seattle Breakers	WHL	46	17	36	53	154	—	—	—	—	—
1985–86	Sherbrooke Canadiens	AHL	68	3	14	17	238	—	—	—	—	—
1985–86	Montreal Canadiens	NHL	5	0	1	1	12	18	0	0	0	53
1986–87	Sherbrooke Canadiens	AHL	10	4	4	8	49	—	—	—	—	—
1986–87	Montreal Canadiens	NHL	44	5	3	8	151	11	2	0	2	19
1987–88	Montreal Canadiens	NHL	60	2	6	8	159	7	2	2	4	26
1988–89	Montreal Canadiens	NHL	6	0	0	0	13	—	—	—	—	—
1988–89	Toronto Maple Leafs	NHL	46	1	2	3	185	—	—	—	—	—
1989–90	Toronto Maple Leafs	NHL	55	9	4	13	252	5	0	1	1	33
1990–91	Newmarket Saints	AHL	8	1	1	2	79	—	—	—	—	—
1990–91	Toronto Maple Leafs	NHL	3	0	0	0	9	—	—	—	—	—
1990–91	Washington Capitals	NHL	7	0	0	0	101	—	—	—	—	—
1991–92	Cape Breton Oilers	AHL	12	2	1	3	141	5	0	1	1	53
1991–92	Quebec Nordiques	NHL	18	0	2	2	115	—	—	—	—	—
NHL totals			244	17	18	35	997	41	4	3	7	131

== Awards ==
- WHL West Second All-Star Team – 1985
- 1986 Stanley Cup Champion. Montreal Canadiens.

== See also ==
- List of ice hockey players who died during their playing careers
