= Guy Carbonneau =

Canadian ice hockey player (born 1960)

- Hockey Hall of Fame, 2019
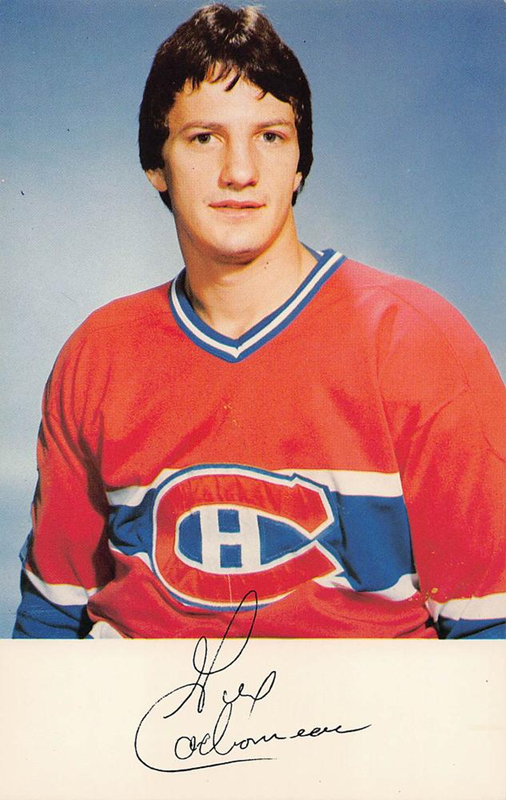
- Carbonneau with the Montreal Canadiens in 1982
- Born: March 18, 1960 (age 66) Sept-Îles, Quebec, Canada
- Height: 5 ft 11 in (180 cm)
- Weight: 175 lb (79 kg; 12 st 7 lb)
- Position: Centre
- Shot: Right
- Played for: Montreal Canadiens; St. Louis Blues; Dallas Stars
- NHL draft: 44th overall, 1979; Montreal Canadiens
- Playing career: 1980–2000

Joseph Harry Guy Carbonneau (car-buh-NOH; born March 18, 1960) is a Canadian former professional ice hockey player, coach and executive in the National Hockey League (NHL). He played 19 seasons in the NHL for the Montreal Canadiens, St. Louis Blues, and Dallas Stars from 1980 to 2000. Most recently, he served as president of the Quebec Major Junior Hockey League's Chicoutimi Saguenéens.

Drafted in the third round by the Canadiens in 1979, he became a regular member of the team in the 1982–83 season and quickly became a reliable defensive forward that recorded five 20-goal seasons while being awarded the Frank J. Selke Trophy three times for his defensive skills. He became captain of the Canadiens in 1989 and led the team to the 1993 championship, currently the last in franchise history. In 1994, he was traded to the Blues, where he played one season before being traded to the Stars in 1995. He played his final five seasons with the team and won the Stanley Cup once more in 1999. He recorded over 200 goals and 600 points in 1,300 games while winning the Stanley Cup three times as a player.

After retiring as a player, he became an assistant coach for Montreal and Dallas from 2000 to 2006. While serving as associate coach with the Canadiens in 2006, he was promoted to head coach and served in the position until he was fired in 2009. He later served as a television analyst and coach/owner of the Chicoutimi Saguenéens until he resigned in 2011. Carbonneau was inducted into the Hockey Hall of Fame in 2019.

== Playing career ==
Carbonneau started his hockey career in the Quebec Major Junior Hockey League with the Chicoutimi Saguenéens. After an impressive 182-point season with the Sagueneens, Carbonneau was drafted 44th overall in the 1979 NHL entry draft by the Montreal Canadiens. His strong play as a defensive forward helped the Canadiens to a Stanley Cup championship in 1985–86, followed by three Frank J. Selke Trophy wins in 1987–1988, 1988–1989, and 1991–1992.

In 1989–1990, he was named the captain of the Canadiens, and led them to the Stanley Cup Final in the 1992–93 season against the Los Angeles Kings. After the Game 1 loss, he was quoted as going into the office of head coach Jacques Demers and stating, “Give me [Wayne] Gretzky"; Gretzky had four points in the opening game but with Carbonneau around him for the next four games, he only had three combined points as Montreal won in five games. Noted for his durable nature, he soon saw his knees start to trouble him. A few days after the team was eliminated in the 1994 playoffs, Carbonneau was playing golf with teammates when he noticed that a photographer for Journal de Montréal was lurking in a tree, which led to him giving the finger that was captured on film and later printed on the front page of the newspaper. In a move later referred to by the Montreal Gazette as a "panic move", Carbonneau was traded on August 19, 1994 to the St. Louis Blues in exchange for Jim Montgomery.

He played there for one season before moving to the Dallas Stars in a trade on October 2, 1996. He won his third Stanley Cup in 1998–1999 with the Stars. Next season, Carbonneau and the Stars reached the Stanley Cup Final again but this time they lost to the New Jersey Devils. Carbonneau announced his retirement on July 1, 2000 after 19 seasons.

Carbonneau was one of the more popular Canadiens; fans chanted "Guy, Guy, Guy!" whenever he touched the puck, much as they did for Guy Lafleur (with whom Carbonneau played from 1982 to 1985) during his career.

He was also one of the most admired Dallas Stars players. He took the ceremonial opening faceoff for the Stars when they played the Canadiens at the last game at the Montreal Forum.

== Post-playing career ==
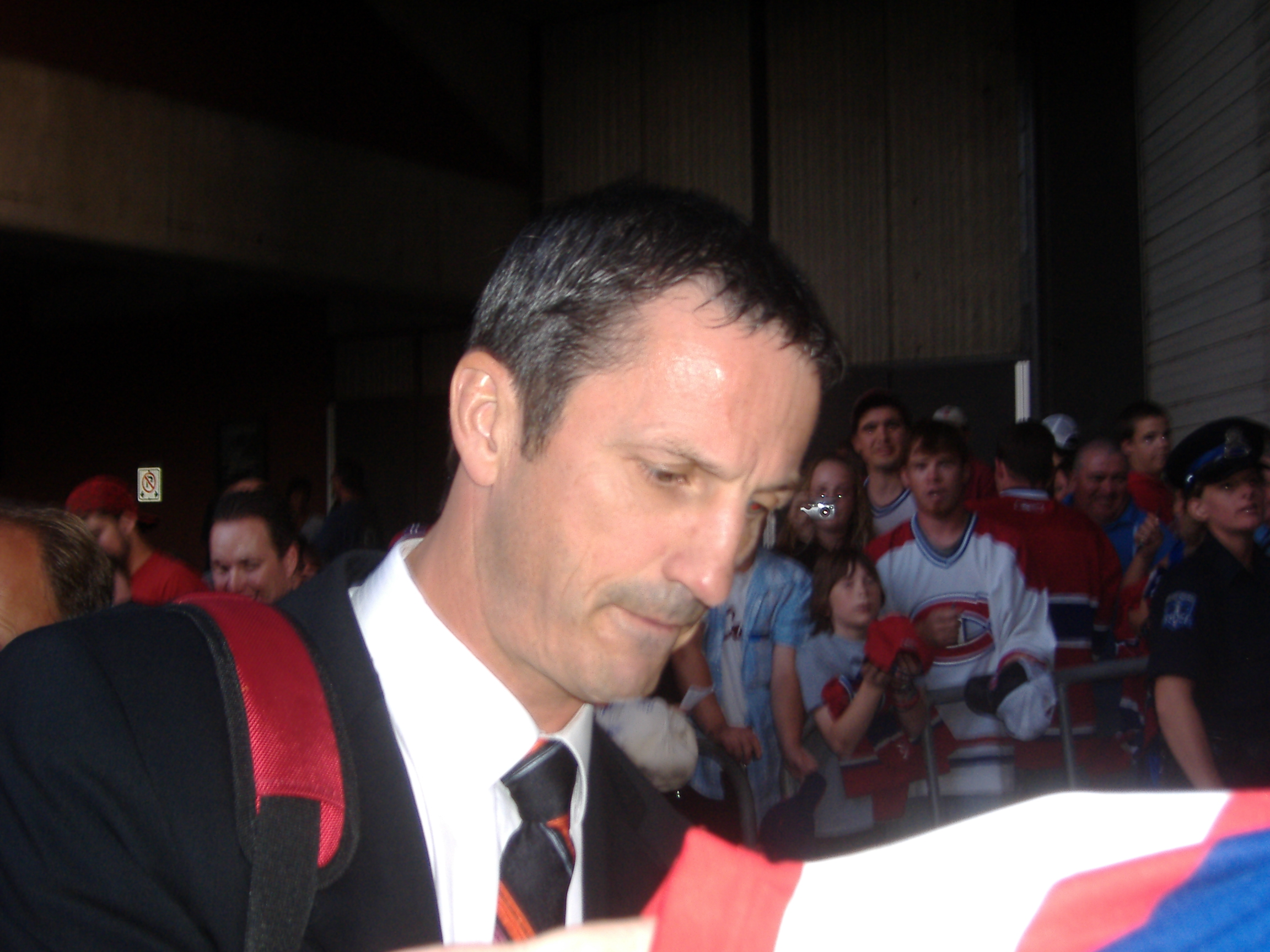
Carbonneau in 2007

In 2005, the Quebec Major Junior Hockey League created the Guy Carbonneau Trophy (Trophée Guy Carbonneau), awarded annually to the player in the QMJHL judged to be the best defensive forward.

After serving as an assistant coach to Michel Therrien with the Canadiens from 2000 to 2002, Carbonneau moved back to the Dallas Stars where he worked as an assistant general manager (he was named to the position on May 26, 2002), until his return to Montreal in January 2006.

On January 14, 2006, Carbonneau became the Montreal Canadiens associate coach, as Claude Julien was fired and GM Bob Gainey assumed the role of interim head coach. Carbonneau became head coach, after the Canadiens were eliminated from the playoffs. He was the 28th coach of the Montreal team.

On April 30, 2008, he was named a candidate for the Jack Adams Award awarded to the best head coach of the year, but lost by 12 points to Washington Capitals coach Bruce Boudreau.

On March 9, 2009, he was fired as the head coach of the Montreal Canadiens with 16 games left. He was replaced by general manager Bob Gainey.

On September 17, 2009, Carbonneau became an analyst for CBC Sports Hockey Night in Canada. He left CBC after the 2009–2010 season and joined Réseau des sports as an analyst. He also appeared in the first season (2010) of La série Montréal-Québec as the head coach for the Montreal team.

On February 7, 2011, Carbonneau became head coach of the Chicoutimi Saguenéens, the team he co-owns. He resigned in July 2011. His group subsequently sold their interest in the team.

On June 25, 2019, Carbonneau was elected to the Hockey Hall of Fame and formally inducted in November.

== Awards and achievements ==
Award	Year(s)
QMJHL Second All-Star Team	1980
Frank J. Selke Trophy	1988, 1989, 1992
Stanley Cup champion	1986, 1993 (Montreal), 1999 (Dallas)
Hockey Hall of Fame	2019

- Coach, Canadian national team, Maccabiah Games 2017, Gold medal winner.

== Career statistics ==
=== Regular season and playoffs ===
			Regular season					Playoffs
Season	Team	League	GP	G	A	Pts	PIM	GP	G	A	Pts	PIM
1976–77	Chicoutimi Saguenéens	QMJHL	59	9	20	29	8	4	1	0	1	0
1977–78	Chicoutimi Saguenéens	QMJHL	70	28	55	83	60	—	—	—	—	—
1978–79	Chicoutimi Saguenéens	QMJHL	72	62	79	141	47	4	2	1	3	4
1979–80	Chicoutimi Saguenéens	QMJHL	72	72	110	182	6	12	9	15	24	28
1979–80	Nova Scotia Voyageurs	AHL	—	—	—	—	—	2	1	1	2	2
1980–81	Montreal Canadiens	NHL	2	0	1	1	0	—	—	—	—	—
1980–81	Nova Scotia Voyageurs	AHL	78	35	53	88	87	6	1	3	4	9
1981–82	Nova Scotia Voyageurs	AHL	77	27	67	94	124	9	2	7	9	8
1982–83	Montreal Canadiens	NHL	77	18	29	47	68	3	0	0	0	2
1983–84	Montreal Canadiens	NHL	78	24	30	54	75	15	4	3	7	12
1984–85	Montreal Canadiens	NHL	79	23	34	57	43	12	4	3	7	8
1985–86	Montreal Canadiens	NHL	80	20	36	56	57	20	7	5	12	35
1986–87	Montreal Canadiens	NHL	79	18	27	45	68	17	3	8	11	20
1987–88	Montreal Canadiens	NHL	80	17	21	38	61	11	0	4	4	2
1988–89	Montreal Canadiens	NHL	79	26	30	56	44	21	4	5	9	10
1989–90	Montreal Canadiens	NHL	68	19	36	55	37	11	2	3	5	6
1990–91	Montreal Canadiens	NHL	78	20	24	44	63	13	1	5	6	10
1991–92	Montreal Canadiens	NHL	72	18	21	39	39	11	1	1	2	6
1992–93	Montreal Canadiens	NHL	61	4	13	17	20	20	3	3	6	10
1993–94	Montreal Canadiens	NHL	79	14	24	38	48	7	1	3	4	4
1994–95	St. Louis Blues	NHL	42	5	11	16	16	7	1	2	3	6
1995–96	Dallas Stars	NHL	71	8	15	23	38	—	—	—	—	—
1996–97	Dallas Stars	NHL	73	5	16	21	36	7	0	1	1	6
1997–98	Dallas Stars	NHL	77	7	17	24	40	16	3	1	4	6
1998–99	Dallas Stars	NHL	74	4	12	16	31	17	2	4	6	6
1999–00	Dallas Stars	NHL	69	10	6	16	36	23	2	4	6	12
NHL totals			1,318	260	403	663	820	231	38	55	93	161

=== Coaching career ===
League	Team	Year	Regular season						Post season			
League	Team	Year	G	W	L	OTL	Pts	Finish	W	L	Win %	Result
NHL
NHL	Montreal Canadiens											
NHL	Montreal Canadiens	2006–07	82	42	34	6	90	4th in Northeast	–	–	–	Missed playoffs
NHL	Montreal Canadiens	2007–08	82	47	25	10	104	1st in Northeast	5	7	.417	Lost in Conference Semifinals (PHI)
NHL	Montreal Canadiens	2008–09	66	35	24	7	77	(fired)	–	–	–	–
3ICE	Team Carbonneau											
3ICE	Team Carbonneau	2022	14	6	8	—		5th place	–	–	–	Missed playoffs
3ICE	Team Carbonneau	2023	6	1	5	—		8th place	–	–	–	Missed playoffs
NHL Total		2006–09	230	124	83	23	271		5	7	45	

Preceded by Bob Gainey	Montreal Canadiens captain 1989–1994 with Chris Chelios, 1989–1990	Succeeded by Kirk Muller
Preceded by Bob Gainey; Interim	Head coach of the Montreal Canadiens; 2006–2009	Succeeded by Bob Gainey; Interim
Preceded by Dave Poulin; Dirk Graham	Winner of the Frank J. Selke Trophy; 1988, 1989; 1992	Succeeded by Rick Meagher; Doug Gilmour
