= Brian Skrudland =

Canadian ice hockey player

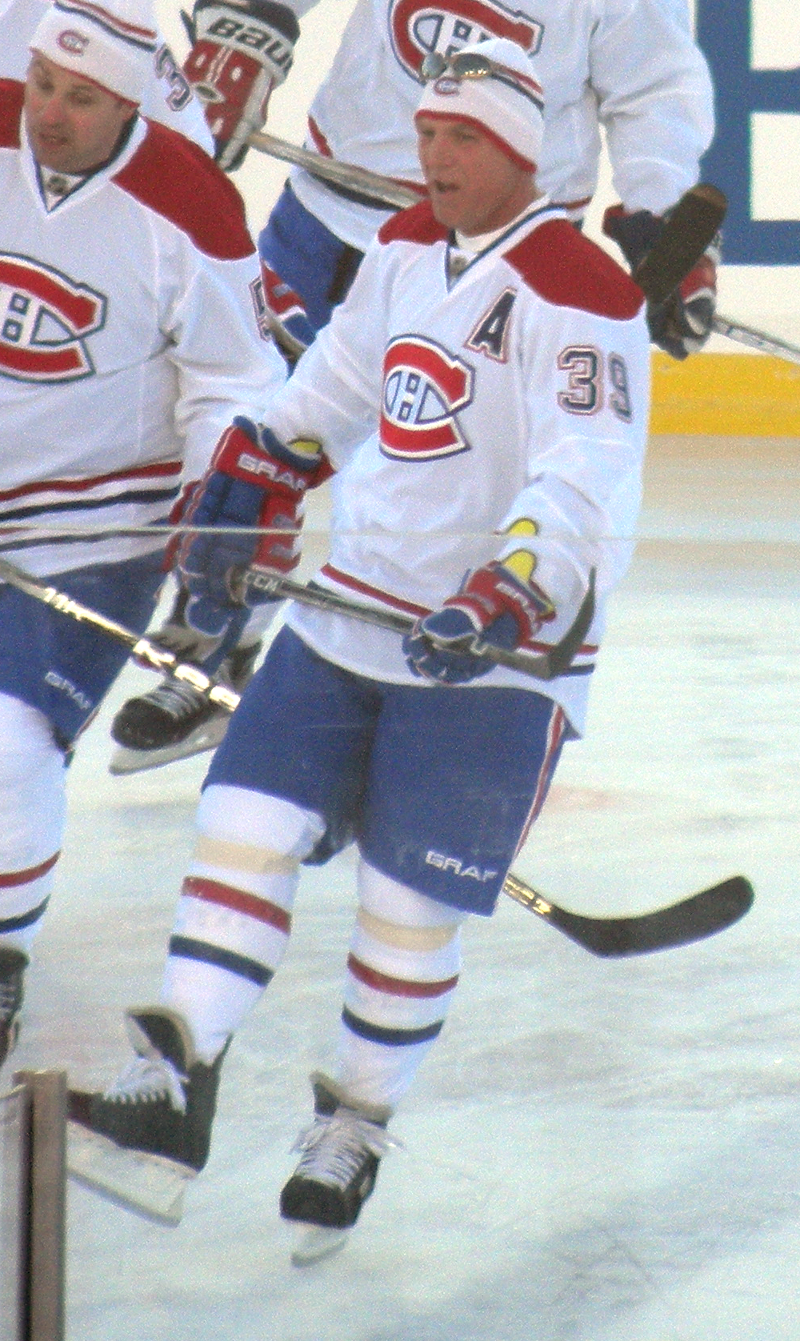
- Skrudland in 2011
- Born: July 31, 1963 (age 62) Peace River, Alberta, Canada
- Height: 6 ft 0 in (183 cm)
- Weight: 200 lb (91 kg; 14 st 4 lb)
- Position: Centre
- Shot: Left
- Played for: Montreal Canadiens; Calgary Flames; Florida Panthers; New York Rangers; Dallas Stars
- NHL draft: Undrafted
- Playing career: 1985–2000

Brian Norman Skrudland (born July 31, 1963) is a Canadian former professional ice hockey player who played for the Montreal Canadiens, Calgary Flames, Florida Panthers, New York Rangers and Dallas Stars.

== Playing career ==
=== Junior ===
Skrudland played for the Saskatoon Blades of the Western Hockey League from 1980 to 1983. His #10 jersey has been retired by the Blades since 2003.

=== Professional ===
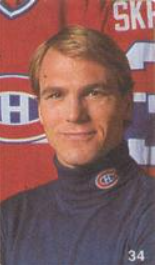
1987 sticker of Skrudland for Montreal Canadiens

Skrudland won the Jack A. Butterfield Trophy as the Most Valuable Player in the 1985 AHL Playoffs. Skrudland scored 17 points in 17 games leading the Sherbrooke Canadiens to a Calder Cup championship. Sherbrooke defeated the Baltimore Skipjacks 4 games to 2 in the final.

Skrudland made his NHL debut in 1985 for the Montreal Canadiens. He played over seven seasons with the Habs, winning the Stanley Cup in 1986. In game two of that series, Skrudland put his name in the NHL record books, when he scored the fastest overtime goal in Stanley Cup playoffs history at nine seconds. He was selected to go to the 1991 NHL All-Star Game, but he could not attend due to injury. Skrudland was traded to the Calgary Flames midway through the 1992–93 season. He moved to the expansion Florida Panthers for the 1993–94 season and was the first captain in franchise history, a title he held for four seasons. Skrudland was with the team until 1997, including Florida's run to the 1996 Stanley Cup Final, where they lost 4–0 to the Colorado Avalanche. He signed with the New York Rangers in the summer of 1997 and played one season with them until he was dealt along with Mike Keane to the Dallas Stars in exchange for Todd Harvey and Bob Errey. Skrudland was instrumental in helping the Stars win the Stanley Cup in 1999; he retired at the close of the 2000 Stanley Cup Final (where the Stars lost to the New Jersey Devils at 36 years old.

Skrudland was one of the final cuts for Team Canada during the 1991 Canada Cup tournament.

Skrudland was a finalist for the Selke Trophy in 1994. The Frank J Selke Trophy is awarded annually to the best defensive minded forward in the NHL.

Skrudland holds the NHL record for fastest goal in a playoff overtime when he scored the winning goal at 0:09 seconds into overtime in game two in the 1986 Final.

== Personal life ==
Skrudland lives in Calgary, Alberta, with his wife Lana, and their three children. From July 6, 2010 until July 9, 2015, he was the director of player development for the Florida Panthers. Skrudland also served as assistant coach for the Panthers during the 2013–14 season.

== Career statistics ==
			Regular season					Playoffs
Season	Team	League	GP	G	A	Pts	PIM	GP	G	A	Pts	PIM
1980–81	Saskatoon Blades	WHL	66	15	27	42	97	—	—	—	—	—
1981–82	Saskatoon Blades	WHL	71	27	29	56	135	5	0	1	1	2
1982–83	Saskatoon Blades	WHL	71	35	59	94	42	6	1	3	4	19
1983–84	Nova Scotia Voyageurs	AHL	56	13	12	25	55	12	2	8	10	14
1984–85	Sherbrooke Canadiens	AHL	70	22	28	50	109	17	9	8	17	23
1985–86	Montreal Canadiens	NHL	65	9	13	22	57	20	2	4	6	76
1986–87	Montreal Canadiens	NHL	79	11	17	28	107	14	1	5	6	29
1987–88	Montreal Canadiens	NHL	79	12	24	36	112	11	1	5	6	24
1988–89	Montreal Canadiens	NHL	71	12	29	41	84	21	3	7	10	40
1989–90	Montreal Canadiens	NHL	59	11	31	42	56	11	3	5	8	30
1990–91	Montreal Canadiens	NHL	57	15	19	34	85	13	3	10	13	42
1991–92	Montreal Canadiens	NHL	42	3	3	6	36	11	1	1	2	20
1992–93	Montreal Canadiens	NHL	23	5	3	8	55	—	—	—	—	—
1992–93	Calgary Flames	NHL	16	2	4	6	10	6	0	3	3	12
1993–94	Florida Panthers	NHL	79	15	25	40	136	—	—	—	—	—
1994–95	Florida Panthers	NHL	47	5	9	14	88	—	—	—	—	—
1995–96	Florida Panthers	NHL	79	7	20	27	129	21	1	3	4	18
1996–97	Florida Panthers	NHL	51	5	13	18	48	—	—	—	—	—
1997–98	New York Rangers	NHL	59	5	6	11	39	—	—	—	—	—
1997–98	Dallas Stars	NHL	13	2	0	2	10	17	0	1	1	16
1998–99	Dallas Stars	NHL	40	4	1	5	33	19	0	2	2	16
1999–00	Dallas Stars	NHL	22	1	2	3	22	—	—	—	—	—
NHL totals			881	124	219	343	1107	164	15	46	61	323

== Awards and honours ==
Award	Year
AHL
Jack A. Butterfield Trophy	1985
Calder Cup champion	1985
NHL
Stanley Cup champion	1986, 1999
All-Star Game	1991

Sporting positions
Preceded by Position created	Florida Panthers captain 1993–97	Succeeded by Scott Mellanby
