= Randy Bucyk =

Canadian ice hockey player

- Born: November 9, 1962 (age 62); Edmonton, Alberta, Canada
- Height: 5 ft 11 in (180 cm)
- Weight: 175 lb (79 kg; 12 st 7 lb)
- Position: Centre
- Shot: Left
- Played for: Montreal Canadiens; Calgary Flames
- National team: Canada
- NHL draft: Undrafted
- Playing career: 1984–1991

Randy Richard Bucyk (born November 9, 1962) is a Canadian former professional ice hockey player who played 19 games in the National Hockey League with the Montreal Canadiens and Calgary Flames between 1986 and 1988. He is the nephew of NHL Hall of Famer Johnny Bucyk.

In 1985 Bucyk won the Calder Cup as American Hockey League championship with the Sherbrooke Canadiens. He was then called a couple of times during the 1985–86 season to play for the Montreal Canadiens, and he skated with the Canadiens for 17 regular season games and 2 playoff games during the Canadiens' Stanley Cup winning season. Although Bucyk was included on the team winning picture and received a Stanley Cup ring from the Canadiens, his name is not engraved on the Stanley Cup.

== Career statistics ==
=== Regular season and playoffs ===
| | | | Regular season | | | | | Playoffs |
| Season | Team | League | GP | G | A | Pts | PIM | GP | G | A | Pts | PIM |
|---|---|---|---|---|---|---|---|---|---|---|---|---|
| 1980–81 | Northeastern University | ECAC | 26 | 9 | 7 | 16 | 18 | — | — | — | — | — |
| 1981–82 | Northeastern University | ECAC | 33 | 19 | 17 | 36 | 10 | — | — | — | — | — |
| 1982–83 | Northeastern University | ECAC | 28 | 16 | 20 | 36 | 16 | — | — | — | — | — |
| 1983–84 | Northeastern University | ECAC | 29 | 16 | 13 | 29 | 11 | — | — | — | — | — |
| 1984–85 | Sherbrooke Canadiens | AHL | 62 | 21 | 26 | 47 | 20 | 8 | 0 | 0 | 0 | 20 |
| 1985–86 | Montreal Canadiens | NHL | 17 | 4 | 2 | 6 | 8 | 2 | 0 | 0 | 0 | 0 |
| 1985–86 | Sherbrooke Canadiens | AHL | 43 | 18 | 33 | 51 | 22 | — | — | — | — | — |
| 1986–87 | Sherbrooke Canadiens | AHL | 70 | 24 | 39 | 63 | 28 | 17 | 3 | 11 | 14 | 2 |
| 1987–88 | Calgary Flames | NHL | 2 | 0 | 0 | 0 | 0 | — | — | — | — | — |
| 1987–88 | Salt Lake Golden Eagles | IHL | 78 | 37 | 45 | 82 | 73 | 19 | 7 | 8 | 15 | 12 |
| 1988–89 | Salt Lake Golden Eagles | IHL | 79 | 28 | 59 | 87 | 24 | 14 | 5 | 5 | 10 | 4 |
| 1988–89 | Canadian National Team | Intl | 4 | 0 | 0 | 0 | 2 | — | — | — | — | — |
| 1989–90 | Salt Lake Golden Eagles | IHL | 67 | 22 | 41 | 63 | 16 | 11 | 2 | 6 | 8 | 10 |
| 1990–891 | Salt Lake Golden Eagles | IHL | 18 | 4 | 4 | 8 | 2 | — | — | — | — | — |
| AHL totals | | | 175 | 63 | 98 | 161 | 70 | 25 | 3 | 11 | 14 | 22 |
| IHL totals | | | 242 | 91 | 149 | 240 | 115 | 44 | 14 | 19 | 33 | 26 |
| NHL totals | | | 19 | 4 | 2 | 6 | 8 | 2 | 0 | 0 | 0 | 0 |
