= Mike Lalor =

American ice hockey player

- Born: March 8, 1963 (age 63) Buffalo, New York, U.S.
- Height: 6 ft 1 in (185 cm)
- Weight: 200 lb (91 kg; 14 st 4 lb)
- Position: Defence
- Shot: Left
- Played for: Montreal Canadiens; St. Louis Blues; Washington Capitals; Winnipeg Jets; San Jose Sharks; Dallas Stars
- National team: United States
- NHL draft: Undrafted
- Playing career: 1983–1997

John Michael Lalor (born March 8, 1963) is an American former professional ice hockey defenceman. Although a U.S. citizen by birth, Lalor spent his youth in Fort Erie, Ontario. Lalor played in the NHL with the Montreal Canadiens, St. Louis Blues, Washington Capitals, Winnipeg Jets, San Jose Sharks and Dallas Stars. He won the Calder Cup in 1985 with Sherbrooke, and a Stanley Cup with the 1986 Canadiens. He currently owns a gym called Teammates Fitness in Wellesley, Massachusetts. Lalor represented the U.S. Hockey Team at the 1996 Men's World Ice Hockey Championships.

== Career statistics ==
=== Regular season and playoffs ===
			Regular season					Playoffs
Season	Team	League	GP	G	A	Pts	PIM	GP	G	A	Pts	PIM
1980–81	Hamilton Mountain A's	OPJHL	44	5	28	33	83	—	—	—	—	—
1981–82	Brantford Alexanders	OHL	64	3	13	16	114	11	0	6	6	11
1982–83	Brantford Alexanders	OHL	65	10	30	40	113	8	1	3	4	20
1983–84	Nova Scotia Voyageurs	AHL	67	5	11	16	80	12	0	2	2	13
1984–85	Sherbrooke Canadiens	AHL	79	9	23	32	114	17	3	5	8	36
1985–86	Montreal Canadiens	NHL	62	3	5	8	56	17	1	2	3	29
1986–87	Montreal Canadiens	NHL	57	0	10	10	47	13	2	1	3	29
1987–88	Montreal Canadiens	NHL	66	1	10	11	113	11	0	0	0	11
1988–89	Montreal Canadiens	NHL	12	1	4	5	15	—	—	—	—	—
1988–89	St. Louis Blues	NHL	36	1	14	15	54	10	1	1	2	14
1989–90	St. Louis Blues	NHL	78	0	16	16	81	12	0	2	2	31
1990–91	Washington Capitals	NHL	68	1	5	6	61	10	1	2	3	22
1991–92	Washington Capitals	NHL	64	5	7	12	64	—	—	—	—	—
1991–92	Winnipeg Jets	NHL	15	2	3	5	14	7	0	0	0	19
1992–93	Winnipeg Jets	NHL	64	1	8	9	76	4	0	2	2	4
1993–94	San Jose Sharks	NHL	23	0	2	2	8	—	—	—	—	—
1993–94	Dallas Stars	NHL	12	0	1	1	6	5	0	0	0	6
1994–95	Dallas Stars	NHL	12	0	0	0	9	3	0	0	0	2
1994–95	Kalamazoo Wings	IHL	5	0	1	1	11	—	—	—	—	—
1995–96	Dallas Stars	NHL	63	1	2	3	31	—	—	—	—	—
1995–96	San Francisco Spiders	IHL	12	2	2	4	6	—	—	—	—	—
1996–97	Dallas Stars	NHL	55	1	1	2	42	—	—	—	—	—
NHL totals			687	17	88	105	677	92	5	10	15	167

=== International ===
Year	Team	Event	Result	GP	G	A	Pts	PIM
1996	United States	WC	3rd place, bronze medalist(s)	8	0	0	0	4
