= Mats Näslund =

Swedish ice hockey player (born 1959)

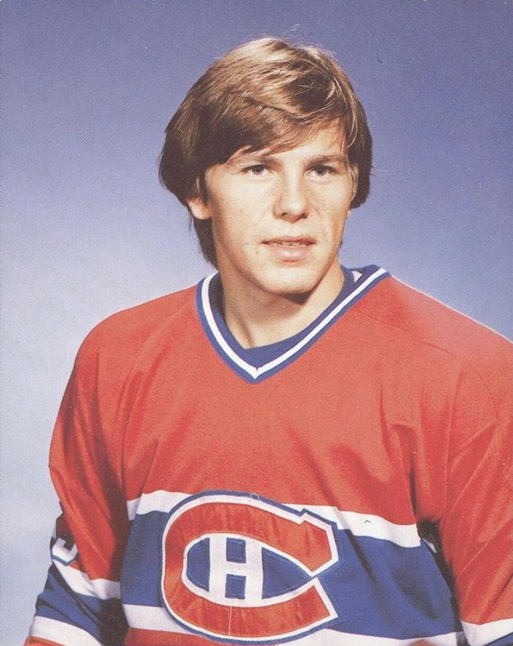
- Näslund with the Montreal Canadiens in 1982
- Born: 31 October 1959 (age 66) Timrå, Sweden
- Height: 5 ft 7 in (170 cm)
- Weight: 161 lb (73 kg; 11 st 7 lb)
- Position: Left wing
- Shot: Left
- Played for: Timrå IK; Brynäs IF; Montreal Canadiens; HC Lugano; Malmö IF; Boston Bruins
- National team: Sweden
- NHL draft: 37th overall, 1979; Montreal Canadiens
- Playing career: 1975–1995

Mats Torsten Näslund (born 31 October 1959), nicknamed "Le Petit Viking", is a Swedish former ice hockey player. He played as a left winger. Despite his small size at only five feet and seven inches, Näslund is best known for being one of the top forwards with the National Hockey League (NHL)'s Montreal Canadiens from 1982 to 1990. In addition to the Canadiens, Näslund played for Timrå IK, Brynäs IF, and Malmö IF of the Swedish Elite League, and HC Lugano of the National League A between 1975 and 1994. He made a short NHL comeback attempt in 1995 with the Boston Bruins following the 1994–95 NHL lockout, and retired after the season's conclusion.

In 1986, he won the Stanley Cup with the Canadiens, and he won the Lady Byng Trophy in 1988. He is a three-time Le Mat Trophy champion, once with Brynäs in 1980, and leading Malmö to its only championship wins in 1992 and 1994. Internationally, he won gold medals at the 1991 World Championship in Finland and the 1994 Winter Olympics in Lillehammer, making him a member of the prestigious Triple Gold Club. He was inducted into the IIHF Hall of Fame in 2005.

== NHL career ==
Näslund was selected in the second round as the 37th overall pick in the 1979 NHL entry draft, by the Montreal Canadiens. After playing for three more years in Sweden, he joined the Canadiens for the 1982–83 NHL season. He was the first European-born player to play for the Canadiens.

In his rookie season of 1982–83, Näslund scored 71 points in 74 games, becoming the Canadiens' third leading scorer behind Guy Lafleur and Ryan Walter, who had 76 and 75 points respectively. That year, he was recognized as the left winger on the NHL All-Rookie Team.

His offensive abilities quickly endeared him to Montreal fans, and he was given the nickname of "Le Petit Viking" (The Little Viking), a reference to his Nordic heritage and his short stature. Teammate Mario Tremblay jokingly said when Näslund arrived that the Habs only received half of a player and the other half would arrive later.

Näslund had his best NHL season in 1985–86. He scored 43 goals and 67 assists (110 points, eighth in the NHL that season), the first Montreal player to top 100 points since Lafleur had 125 in 1979–80, and the last Canadien to reach 100 points or finish among the league's top ten scorers as of 2024–25. His 67 assists were an NHL record for a left winger until Kevin Stevens of the Pittsburgh Penguins scored 69 in 1991–92. In the 1986 Stanley Cup playoffs, the speedy Näslund was Montreal's top point-getter (with 19), as the Canadiens won their twenty-third Stanley Cup, their first since 1979. He also led the Montreal Canadiens in scoring in 1986–87, albeit with 30 points fewer than he had the preceding season.

During his NHL career, Näslund was an infrequent visitor to the penalty box. Never logging more than 19 penalty minutes in any season during his career, his gentlemanly play was recognized when he was voted the winner of the 1987–88 Lady Byng Memorial Trophy, beating Wayne Gretzky in the voting. He became the second Canadiens player to win the Lady Byng, after Toe Blake in 1945–46. During the 1988 NHL All-Star Game, his five assists established a record, and he was instrumental in helping Mario Lemieux set the All-Star Game record with six points.

After a sub-par 1989–90 season, worn down by the relatively long NHL seasons, Näslund left the Canadiens to return to Europe. He played one year in Switzerland, followed by three seasons in his native Sweden. He returned to the NHL to play for the Boston Bruins in the lockout shortened 1994–95 season, and retired from hockey thereafter.

Näslund ranks twelfth on the Canadiens all-time scoring list, with 612 points in 617 regular season games.

Despite both playing ice hockey and coming from Västernorrland County, he is not related to Markus Näslund.

== International career ==
Mats Näslund
Medal record

Men's ice hockey

Olympic Games

Men's Ice hockey
Gold medal – first place	1994 Lillehammer	Sweden
Bronze medal – third place	1980 Lake Placid	Sweden

World Championships
Gold medal – first place	1991 Finland	Sweden
Silver medal – second place	1981 Sweden	Sweden
Bronze medal – third place	1979 Soviet Union	Sweden

Näslund is one of Swedish hockey's all-time great players, and as such represented his country at numerous international tournaments. As a junior, he represented Sweden at the 1978 and 1979 World Junior Hockey Championship, winning a silver medal in 1978 and a bronze medal the following year.

Näslund would go on to participate in five World Championships, winning a bronze in 1979, a silver in 1981 and a gold in 1991, his last appearance at the event. Because the World Championships occur at the same time as the Stanley Cup playoffs, Näslund was often not available for the event during his best years in Montreal. His sole appearance as an active NHL player came in 1983.

Näslund did get the chance to play for Sweden against the NHL's best players at the 1984, 1987 and 1991 Canada Cup, the forerunner to the World Cup. The Swedes lost to Canada in the finals of the 1984 event. They reached the semifinal game in both 1987 and 1991, losing to the USSR and Canada respectively.

Näslund also participated in two Winter Olympics, in 1980 and 1994. Sweden won the bronze medal in 1980 and the gold medal in 1994, that year defeating Canada in a memorable shootout. The gold medal in 1994 gave Näslund the distinction of having won the Stanley Cup, World Championship and Olympic Championship in his career, and (along with Håkan Loob and Tomas Jonsson) becoming the first member(s) of the Triple Gold Club.

As general manager for the Swedish national men's ice hockey team, Näslund helped construct the gold medal-winning team at the 2006 Winter Olympics.

== Career statistics ==
=== Regular season and playoffs ===
			Regular season					Playoffs
Season	Team	League	GP	G	A	Pts	PIM	GP	G	A	Pts	PIM
1975–76	Timrå IK	SEL	3	0	0	0	0	—	—	—	—	—
1976–77	Timrå IK	SWE-2	17	15	13	28	—	—	—	—	—	—
1977–78	Timrå IK	SEL	35	13	6	19	14	—	—	—	—	—
1978–79	Brynäs IF	SEL	36	12	12	24	19	—	—	—	—	—
1979–80	Brynäs IF	SEL	36	18	19	37	34	7	2	2	4	4
1980–81	Brynäs IF	SEL	36	17	25	42	34	—	—	—	—	—
1981–82	Brynäs IF	SEL	36	24	18	42	16	—	—	—	—	—
1982–83	Montreal Canadiens	NHL	74	26	45	71	10	3	1	0	1	0
1983–84	Montreal Canadiens	NHL	77	29	35	64	4	15	6	8	14	4
1984–85	Montreal Canadiens	NHL	80	42	37	79	14	12	7	4	11	6
1985–86	Montreal Canadiens	NHL	80	43	67	110	16	20	8	11	19	4
1986–87	Montreal Canadiens	NHL	79	25	55	80	16	17	7	15	22	11
1987–88	Montreal Canadiens	NHL	78	24	59	83	14	6	0	7	7	2
1988–89	Montreal Canadiens	NHL	77	33	51	84	14	21	4	11	15	6
1989–90	Montreal Canadiens	NHL	72	21	20	41	19	3	1	1	2	0
1990–91	HC Lugano	NDA	31	27	29	56	—	11	4	9	13	—
1991–92	Malmö IF	SEL	39	15	24	39	10	10	3	2	5	0
1992–93	Malmö IF	SEL	33	11	21	32	10	1	0	0	0	0
1993–94	Malmö IF	SEL	40	14	30	44	8	11	2	4	6	4
1994–95	Boston Bruins	NHL	34	8	14	22	4	5	1	0	1	0
SEL totals			294	124	155	279	145	29	7	8	15	8
NHL totals			651	251	383	634	111	102	35	57	92	33

=== International ===
Year	Team	Event	GP	G	A	Pts	PIM
1977	Sweden	WJC	7	2	0	2	14
1977	Sweden	EJC	6	9	3	12	2
1978	Sweden	WJC	7	2	8	10	6
1979	Sweden	WJC	6	2	3	5	6
1979	Sweden	WC	8	5	2	7	8
1980	Sweden	OLY	7	3	7	10	6
1981	Sweden	WC	8	0	3	3	6
1982	Sweden	WC	10	2	4	6	6
1983	Sweden	WC	10	3	4	7	2
1984	Sweden	CC	8	2	3	5	6
1987	Sweden	CC	6	1	2	3	2
1991	Sweden	WC	10	3	5	8	0
1991	Sweden	CC	6	1	3	4	0
1992	Sweden	OLY	8	1	5	6	27
1994	Sweden	OLY	8	0	7	7	0
Junior totals			26	15	14	29	28
Senior totals			89	21	45	66	63

== Awards, honors and championships ==
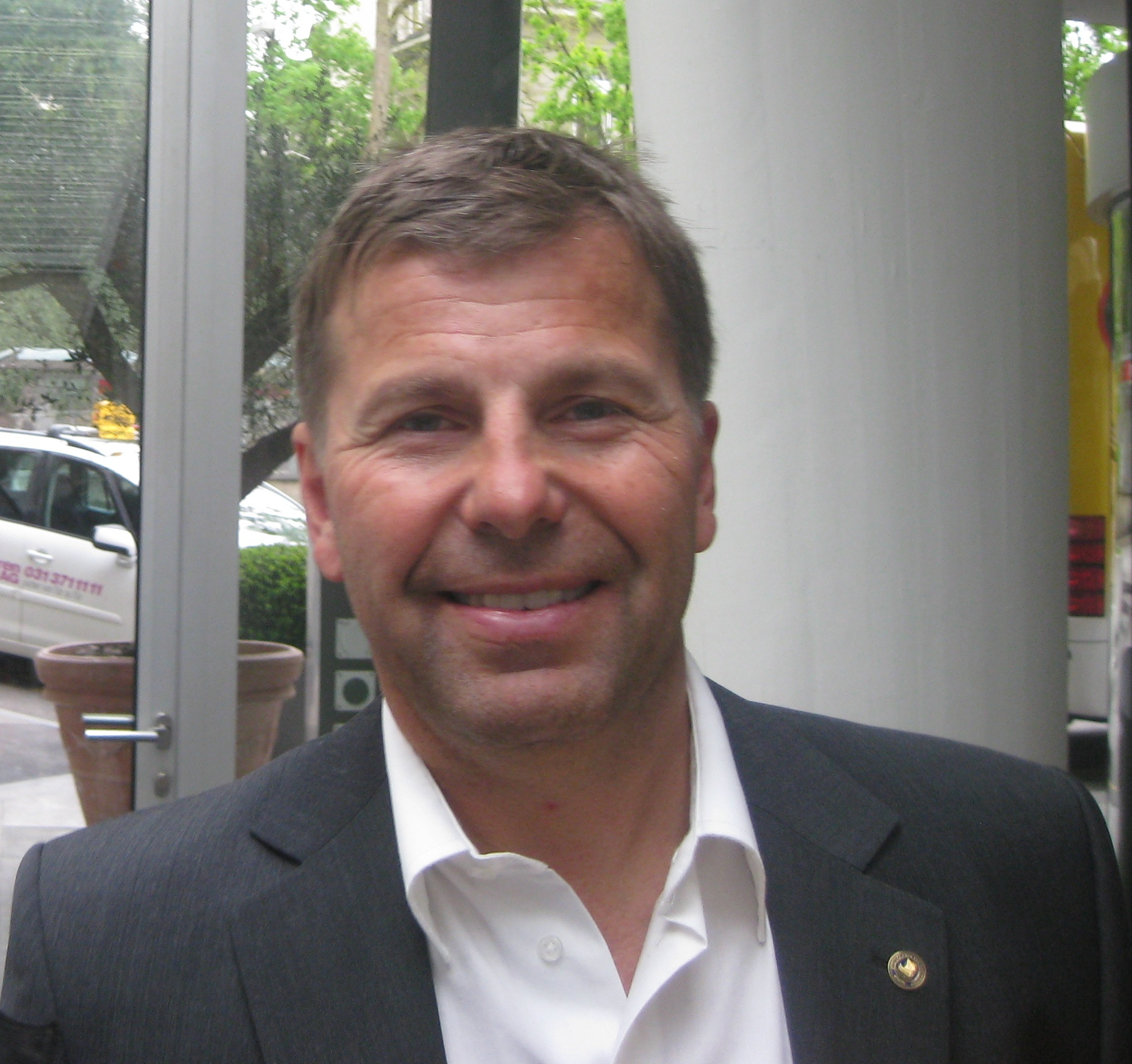
Näslund in 2009

- World Junior Ice Hockey Championship All-Star Team, 1978
- Golden Puck (Swedish Player of the Year), 1980
- Swedish league champion, 1980, 1992, 1994
- NHL All-Rookie Team, 1983
- Played in NHL All-Star Game, 1984, 1986, 1988, 1989 (injured, did not play)
- Viking Award (for the best Swede in the NHL), 1985, 1986
- NHL Second All-Star Team, 1986
- Stanley Cup champion, 1986
- Lady Byng Trophy, 1988
- World Champion, 1991
- Olympic gold medal, 1994
- Inducted into the IIHF Hall of Fame in 2005

Preceded by Anders Kallur	Golden Puck; 1980	Succeeded by Peter Lindmark
Preceded by Joe Mullen	Lady Byng Memorial Trophy; 1988	Succeeded by Joe Mullen
