= Bob Gainey =

Canadian ice hockey player (born 1953)

- Hockey Hall of Fame, 1992
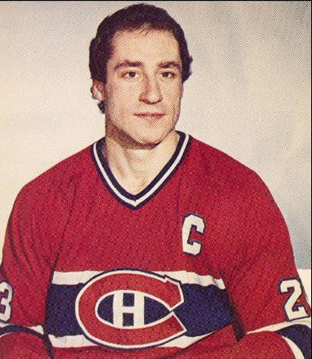
- Gainey with the Montreal Canadiens in 1981
- Born: December 13, 1953 (age 72) Peterborough, Ontario, Canada
- Height: 6 ft 2 in (188 cm)
- Weight: 190 lb (86 kg; 13 st 8 lb)
- Position: Left wing
- Shot: Left
- Played for: Montreal Canadiens
- Coached for: Minnesota North Stars; Dallas Stars; Montreal Canadiens
- National team: Canada
- NHL draft: 8th overall, 1973; Montreal Canadiens
- WHA draft: 7th overall, 1973; Minnesota Fighting Saints
- Playing career: 1973–1990
- Coaching career: 1989–2009
Medal record
Ice hockey
Representing Canada
Canada Cup
Gold medal – first place	1976 Canada	Team
World Championships
Bronze medal – third place	1982 Finland	Team
Bronze medal – third place	1983 West Germany	Team

Robert Michael Gainey (born December 13, 1953) is a Canadian former professional ice hockey player and executive. He played 16 seasons as a left winger in the National Hockey League (NHL) for the Montreal Canadiens.

Regarded as a shutdown player since his play with the Peterborough Petes of the Ontario Hockey League, Gainey was drafted by both the NHL and World Hockey Association as a first round draft pick in 1973, with Gainey choosing to play with the Canadiens. In the 1977–78 season, he was the inaugural winner of the Frank J. Selke Trophy for his skill as a defensive forward and he would be awarded the trophy in the following three seasons; he is the only player to win the Selke Trophy in four consecutive seasons. In the 1979 Stanley Cup playoffs, he scored 16 points in 16 games and was awarded the Conn Smythe Trophy for his playoff performance. A four-time All-Star, Gainey was named team captain prior to the 1981–82 season, where he served until his retirement from the NHL in 1989; he played one season as player-coach of the French team Epinal Squirrels. As a player, Gainey won the Stanley Cup five times. In 2008, the Canadiens retired his number 23 jersey, the 14th player to receive the honor.

After retiring as a player, he became a hockey coach for the Minnesota North Stars, which reached the Final in 1991 on a string of upsets before losing in six games. He was named general manager of the team in 1992 and stayed at the position when the team moved to Dallas in 1993. He stepped down as coach in the middle of the 1995–96 season but stayed on as general manager. In his time with Dallas, the team was awarded the Presidents' Trophy twice while reaching the Stanley Cup Final twice, winning once in 1999 for Gainey's sixth Stanley Cup championship. He departed the Stars to become general manager of the Canadiens in 2003, where he served for the next seven years until he resigned in 2010. Currently, Gainey serves as a team consultant for the St. Louis Blues as well as a volunteer senior advisor for the Peterborough Petes of the Ontario Hockey League.

Gainey was inducted into the Hockey Hall of Fame in 1992. In 2017, he was named one of the '100 Greatest NHL Players' in history.

== Early years ==
Bob Gainey began his hockey career in 1972 with his hometown team, the Peterborough Petes of the Ontario Hockey League. His lack of scoring was made up for by his impressive ability to shut down opposing players. This impressed many scouts in the NHL and in 1973, he was drafted eighth overall by the Montreal Canadiens. He was also drafted seventh overall by the Minnesota Fighting Saints of the WHA although he never joined the WHA.

== Professional years ==
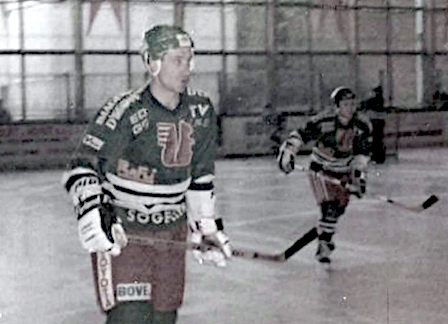
Gainey with the Epinal Squirrels in 1989

As a rookie, Gainey was committed to a defensive style of play. In his second year, he was paired up with stars Yvan Cournoyer and Jacques Lemaire on the second line. In 1976, Gainey was chosen to represent Team Canada at the Canada Cup tournament where he helped Team Canada win the Cup against the Czechoslovaks. A defensive specialist, Gainey played with the Montreal Canadiens from 1973–74 to 1988–89, winning four consecutive Frank J. Selke Trophies, awarded to the league's best defensive forward, and four consecutive Stanley Cups from 1976 to 1979.

In 1982, Canadiens captain Serge Savard retired from hockey and Gainey was named as his successor. The Canadiens remained successful in the regular season but in the playoffs, they were defeated in the first round three consecutive times from 1981 to 1983. Next season, the Canadiens earned a disappointing record finishing with 75 points only. Despite that, they embarked on a surprising playoff run before being eliminated in the semifinals by the New York Islanders.

Gainey lifted his last Stanley Cup as a player in 1986 against the Calgary Flames, and scored a playoff total of 5 goals and 10 points. Under Gainey's leadership, the Canadiens posted back to back 100 point seasons in 1988 and 1989. In 1989, the Canadiens reached the Final again against the Calgary Flames, a rematch from 1986. This time, the Flames won the Stanley Cup in 6 games. Following the loss, Gainey announced his retirement.

In total, Bob Gainey played in 1160 regular season games, scored 239 goals, and registered 263 assists. He was elected to the Hockey Hall of Fame in 1992. In 1998, Gainey was ranked number 86 on The Hockey News' list of the 100 Greatest Hockey Players.

== Post hockey playing years ==
After his retirement, Gainey moved to France where he was player-coach for the Epinal Écureuils (Squirrels) of the French Nationale 1B division. His unexpected appearance on the French hockey scene created quite a stir as curious fans attended games to see the famous star in action for Epinal. He finished second in scoring for Epinal during the regular season and 18th overall in the Nationale 1B division.

Gainey returned to North America a year later and became head coach of the Minnesota North Stars in 1990–91, guiding his team to the sixth game of the Stanley Cup Final in his first season. In January 1992, Gainey also was named general manager. In 1996, a few seasons after the franchise relocated to Dallas and became the Dallas Stars, he stepped down as head coach to focus solely on his general manager duties. Gainey turned the franchise into a powerhouse by acquiring players such as Joe Nieuwendyk, Brett Hull, Ed Belfour and Sergei Zubov. The team won the Presidents' Trophy in 1998 and 1999. Dallas won the Stanley Cup in 1999.

In 1997, as Stars general manager, Gainey drafted his son Steve Gainey 77th overall in the annual NHL entry draft. Gainey won the Stanley Cup a sixth time in 1999 with Dallas.

Along with Bobby Clarke and Pierre Gauthier, Gainey was given the responsibility of selecting Canada's men's ice hockey squad for the 1998 Winter Olympics in Nagano, Japan.

Gainey became general manager of the Montreal Canadiens in May 2003. On January 13, 2006, Gainey fired Canadiens' head coach Claude Julien and stepped in as head coach on an interim basis. At the same time, he hired Guy Carbonneau to work as an associate coach, handing the coaching reins over to him for the 2006–07 season. On July 24, 2006, Montreal Canadiens president Pierre Boivin extended Gainey's contract to 2009–10.

On February 23, 2008, the Canadiens retired Gainey's #23 jersey.

On March 9, 2009, Gainey named himself the interim coach of the Montreal Canadiens after firing Guy Carbonneau. On June 1, 2009, he signed Jacques Martin as the new head coach. On February 8, 2010, he resigned as the Canadiens general manager for personal reasons, and was succeeded by Gauthier. The Canadiens were 28-26-6 at the time of his resignation. He remained on as a consultant to the team until the end of the 2011–12 season, following the firing of Pierre Gauthier, when it was mutually agreed, between Gainey and team President Geoff Molson, that he step down.

On May 9, 2012, the Dallas Stars announced Gainey's hiring as a team consultant.

On October 1, 2014, the St. Louis Blues announced Gainey's hiring as a team consultant. In 2022, he was inducted into the Stars Hall of Fame as part of the inaugural class.

== Awards and achievements ==
- Frank J. Selke Trophy winner in 1978, 1979, 1980, 1981.
- Selected to the NHL All-Star Game in 1977, 1978, 1980, 1981.
- Conn Smythe Trophy winner in 1979.
- Stanley Cup championships in 1976, 1977, 1978, 1979, 1986 (as player), 1999 (as general manager).
- Inducted into the Hockey Hall of Fame in 1992.
- In 1998, Gainey was ranked number 86 on The Hockey News' list of the 100 Greatest Hockey Players.
- His #23 was retired by the Montreal Canadiens on February 23, 2008.

== Career statistics ==
=== Regular season and playoffs ===
			Regular season					Playoffs
Season	Team	League	GP	G	A	Pts	PIM	GP	G	A	Pts	PIM
1971–72	Peterborough Petes	OHA-Jr.	1	0	0	0	31	—	—	—	—	—
1972–73	Peterborough Petes	OHA-Jr.	52	22	21	43	99	—	—	—	—	—
1973–74	Montreal Canadiens	NHL	66	3	7	10	34	6	0	0	0	6
1973–74	Nova Scotia Voyageurs	AHL	6	2	5	7	4	—	—	—	—	—
1974–75	Montreal Canadiens	NHL	80	17	20	37	49	11	2	4	6	4
1975–76	Montreal Canadiens	NHL	78	15	13	28	57	13	1	3	4	20
1976–77	Montreal Canadiens	NHL	80	14	19	33	41	14	4	1	5	25
1977–78	Montreal Canadiens	NHL	66	15	16	31	57	15	2	7	9	14
1978–79	Montreal Canadiens	NHL	79	20	18	38	44	16	6	10	16	10
1979–80	Montreal Canadiens	NHL	64	14	19	33	32	10	1	1	2	4
1980–81	Montreal Canadiens	NHL	78	23	24	47	36	3	0	0	0	2
1981–82	Montreal Canadiens	NHL	79	21	24	45	24	5	0	1	1	8
1982–83	Montreal Canadiens	NHL	80	12	18	30	43	3	0	0	0	4
1983–84	Montreal Canadiens	NHL	77	17	22	39	41	15	1	5	6	9
1984–85	Montreal Canadiens	NHL	79	19	13	32	40	12	1	3	4	13
1985–86	Montreal Canadiens	NHL	80	20	23	43	20	20	5	5	10	12
1986–87	Montreal Canadiens	NHL	47	8	8	16	19	17	1	3	4	6
1987–88	Montreal Canadiens	NHL	78	11	11	22	14	6	0	1	1	6
1988–89	Montreal Canadiens	NHL	49	10	7	17	34	16	1	4	5	8
1989–90	Epinal Squirrels	France-2	18	14	12	26	16	10	6	7	13	14
NHL totals			1,160	239	262	501	585	182	25	48	73	151

=== International ===
Year	Team	Event	GP	G	A	Pts	PIM
1976	Canada	CC	5	2	0	2	2
1981	Canada	CC	7	1	3	4	2
1982	Canada	WC	10	2	1	3	0
1983	Canada	WC	10	0	6	6	2
Senior totals			32	5	10	15	6

== NHL coaching record ==
Team	Year	Regular season							Post season
Team	Year	G	W	L	T	OTL	Pts	Finish	Result
MIN	1990–91	80	27	39	14	-	68	4th in Norris	Lost in Stanley Cup Final (PIT)
MIN	1991–92	80	32	42	6	-	70	4th in Norris	Lost in first round
MIN	1992–93	84	36	38	10	-	82	5th in Norris	Missed playoffs
DAL	1993–94	84	42	29	13	-	97	3rd in Central	Lost in second round
DAL	1994–95	48	17	23	8	-	42	5th in Central	Lost in first round
DAL	1995–96	39	11	19	9	-	(66)	(stepped down)	
MTL	2005–06	41	23	15	-	3	(93)	3rd in Northeast	Lost in first round
MTL	2008–09	16	6	6	-	4	(93)	2nd in Northeast	Lost in first round
Total		472	194	211	60	7			

== Personal life ==
Bob Gainey, with his wife Cathy, were parents to one son and three daughters: Steve (whom he drafted in the 1997 NHL entry draft), Colleen, Anna (the former president of the Liberal Party of Canada and Canadian member of parliament (MP) for Notre-Dame-de-Grâce—Westmount), and Laura.

Gainey's wife Cathy died in June 1995 at age 39 of brain cancer. Gainey's daughter, Laura, died at age 25 in December 2006, when she was swept overboard while sailing in the North Atlantic on the barque Picton Castle, a sail-training tall ship based out of Lunenburg, Nova Scotia, registered in the Cook Islands and destined for Grenada. Laura's body was never recovered, and the U.S. Coast Guard called off the search on December 11, three days after she was swept overboard. During this time, Gainey temporarily passed his general manager duties on to Montreal Canadiens assistant manager (and eventual successor) Pierre Gauthier for four weeks. On January 3, 2007, officials in the Cook Islands named Captain Andrew Scheer to head an investigation into Laura's death. Captain Scheer interviewed the 30-strong crew and examined the ship's logs, emergency equipment and crew qualifications. Laura's death and the subsequent investigations received considerable press attention in Canada, including a documentary produced by the CBC News program The Fifth Estate, which was highly critical of safety standards on Picton Castle.

Preceded by John Van Boxmeer	Montreal Canadiens first-round draft pick 1973	Succeeded by Cam Connor
Preceded by Award created	Winner of the Frank J. Selke Trophy; 1978–1981	Succeeded by Steve Kasper
Preceded by Larry Robinson	Winner of the Conn Smythe Trophy; 1979	Succeeded by Bryan Trottier
Preceded by Serge Savard	Montreal Canadiens captain 1981–89	Succeeded by Guy Carbonneau; Chris Chelios
Preceded by Pierre Pagé	Head coach of the Minnesota North Stars/Dallas Stars; 1990–95	Succeeded by Ken Hitchcock
Preceded by Bobby Clarke	General manager of the Minnesota North Stars/Dallas Stars; 1992–2002	Succeeded by Doug Armstrong
Preceded by André Savard	General manager of the Montreal Canadiens; 2003–10	Succeeded by Pierre Gauthier
Preceded by Claude Julien; Guy Carbonneau	Head Coach of the Montreal Canadiens; 2006 (interim); 2009 (interim)	Succeeded by Guy Carbonneau; Jacques Martin
