= List of Washington Capitals broadcasters =

Monumental Sports Network (MNMT) has carried Capitals games locally since its founding as Home Team Sports (HTS) in 1984. Monumental Sports Network was known as NBC Sports Washington from 2017 to 2023, and Comcast SportsNet Mid-Atlantic (CSN) from 2001 through 2017. MNMT's commentators are Joe Beninati, Craig Laughlin, "Inside-the-Glass" reporter Alan May, and rinkside reporter Al Koken.

The Capitals' flagship radio station is WJFK-FM (106.7 FM); commentators are John Walton and Ken Sabourin. The team's radio network consists of stations in Washington, Virginia, Maryland, West Virginia, Pennsylvania, and North Carolina.

== Radio ==
WTOP (1500 AM) was the Capitals' first radio home through the 1986–87 season. After nine years on WMAL (630 AM), the games returned to 1500 AM for the 1996–97 season. Ron Weber was the first announcer, and he never missed a game through his retirement at the end of the 1996–97 season. WJFK-FM began airing postseason games during the 2008 playoffs. 1500 AM, since renamed WFED, remained the flagship station until 2012, when WJFK took over all coverage. WFED continues to broadcast games as a network affiliate. This is primarily to take advantage of its 50,000-watt clear-channel signal, which brings Capitals games to the entire eastern half of North America at night.

Weber rejoined current announcers Walton and Sabourin for the first period of Game 4 of the 2018 Stanley Cup Final.

WJFK-FM attracted controversy when it elected to drop the Capitals in the 2016–17 season, leaving the Capitals to air solely on WFED. However, WFED's signal is unusable in some portions of the Washington suburbs at night, since it is directed north-south to protect co-channel KSTP. The Washington Wizards also took priority over the Capitals on WFED in case of a conflict, leading to some games in which the only home broadcast was available via Internet streaming. The team responded to fan complaints by reaching a temporary deal in January 2017 to place the rest of its games on WWDC-HD2, which is available metro-wide to those with HD Radios and has a low-powered analog signal that covers the city itself. The Capitals reached a deal to return to WJFK-FM for the 2017–18 season In 2020 a deal was signed through January 3rd, 2026 allowing WDCH 99.1 -- to be an overflow station when WJFK and WFED are taken by another prioritized event.

Years	Play-by-play	Color commentators
1974–79	Ron Weber	Jack Doniger (home games)
1979–80, 1981–91	Ron Weber	
1980–81	Ron Weber	Frank Daly (home games)
1991–94	Ron Weber	Shawn Simpson (home games)
1994–97	Ron Weber	Joe Beninati (when not on TV)
1997–02	Steve Kolbe	Craig Laughlin (when not on TV)
2002–11	Steve Kolbe	Ken Sabourin
2011–present	John Walton (primary); Grady Whittenburg or Zack Fisch (during Walton's NHL on NBC assignments)	Ken Sabourin

== Television ==
WTOP-TV (channel 9) picked up television coverage for the Capitals' first three seasons, covering 15 road games in the 1974–75 season. Sportscaster Warner Wolf was the commentator for the first season. Team radio broadcaster Ron Weber moved to the TV booth for telecasts in the second and third seasons. The Capitals moved to longtime home WDCA (channel 20) in the 1977–78 season. WDCA later split games with HTS/CSN upon its founding in 1984. The 1991–92 season illustrates a typical arrangement: WDCA showed 20 road games and any road playoff games, while HTS picked up 34 home games and any home playoff games, leaving 28 regular-season games not televised. After 19 seasons on WDCA, the Capitals moved their over-the-air broadcasts to WBDC (channel 50) for the 1995–96 season. All 82 games were televised for the first time in the 2001–02 season. The Capitals have not aired any games over-the-air locally since the end of the 2005–06 season.

Years	Play-by-play	Color commentator
1974-75	Hal Kelly	Warner Wolf
1975–77	Ron Weber	Jack Doniger
1977–78	Lyle Stieg	Roger Crozier
1978–79	Jim West	Jack Doniger
1979–80	Jim West	Nick Charles
1980–81	Jim West	Jack Lynch
1981–83	Jim West	Yvon Labre
1983–84	Scott Wahle	Danny Gallivan
1984–90	Mike Fornes	Al Koken
1990–92	Jeff Rimer	Craig Laughlin
1992–93	Kenny Albert (HTS); Jeff Rimer (WDCA)	Craig Laughlin
1993–94	Kenny Albert (HTS); Jeff Rimer (WDCA)	Craig Laughlin (HTS); Shawn Simpson (WDCA)
1994-2014	Joe Beninati	Craig Laughlin
2014–present	Joe Beninati	Craig Laughlin; Alan May ("Inside-the-Glass" reporter on all home games)
