= Steve Kolbe =

American sportscaster (born 1967)

- Born: 1967 (age 58–59); Baltimore, Maryland
- Occupation: Sports commentator

Steve Kolbe is an American sportscaster who has ties to the Pittsburgh Penguins and the play-by-play announcer for Minor League Baseball's Jacksonville Suns of the Double-A Southern League. From the 1998–99 NHL season to the 2010–11 NHL season he was the radio play-by-play announcer for the Washington Capitals.

== Early life ==
Steve Kolbe was born in 1967 in Baltimore, Maryland. He moved to Yale Heights, near Catonsville, Maryland, and went to Mount St. Joseph High School in the early 1980s. He played on the school football team but they didn't have a hockey team so he joined a private team, the Baltimore Stars, where he was a goalie.

Kolbe attended college at Michigan State University where he majored in telecommunications before graduating in 1989. His first broadcasting job was for Michigan State's campus radio. In 1992 he then got a job with a new sports talk radio station in Washington, D.C. — WTEM.

== Washington Capitals ==
The Washington Capitals moved to WTEM in 1995 and Kolbe became the pregame and postgame host. Nicknamed "The Iceman", he also hosted Sunday Morning at Center Ice, a radio show that covered the NHL. In 1996, Kolbe moved to the booth to become a color analyst for the Capitals, joining play by play radio legend Ron Weber.

In 1997, Ron Weber retired after 23 years of broadcasting, and Kolbe became the team's next radio play-by-play announcer. He and Weber were the only play-by-play radio commentators in the history of the team through 2011. Beginning in 2002, Kolbe was partnered with color analyst Ken Sabourin, a former player for the Calgary Flames and Washington Capitals. On November 11, 2010, Kolbe called his 1,000th career regular season game for the Capitals, a game against the Tampa Bay Lightning.

On August 9, 2011, it was announced on the Capitals website that John Walton, the former radio voice of the AHL Hershey Bears would be the new radio voice of the Capitals for the next season. No reason was given for Kolbe not returning.

== Other radio work ==
Kolbe has done play-by-play work for the Portland Pirates of the American Hockey League, who were the Capitals' top level minor league affiliate previously. He has also been a sports anchor, producer and soccer studio host.

== Personal life ==
Kolbe currently lives in Frederick County, Maryland. His hobbies include fishing, archery and playing the drums.

== See also ==
- List of current National Hockey League broadcasters
