= Craig Laughlin =

Canadian ice hockey player

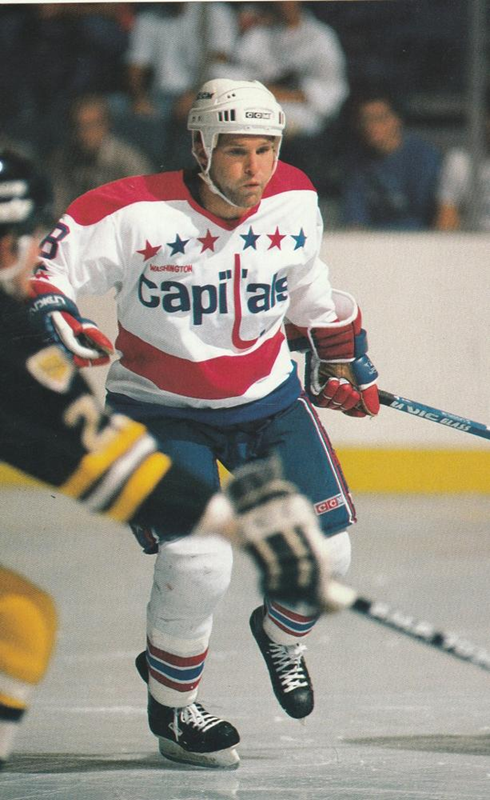
- Laughlin in 1987 photo
- Born: September 14, 1957 (age 69) Toronto, Ontario, Canada
- Height: 6 ft 0 in (183 cm)
- Weight: 190 lb (86 kg; 13 st 8 lb)
- Position: Right wing
- Shot: Right
- Played for: Montreal Canadiens; Washington Capitals; Los Angeles Kings; Toronto Maple Leafs; EV Landshut
- NHL draft: 162nd overall, 1977; Montreal Canadiens
- Playing career: 1977–1990

Craig Alan Laughlin (born September 14, 1957) is a Canadian former professional ice hockey right wing, who is the color analyst for the Washington Capitals on Monumental Sports Network. He played in the National Hockey League (NHL) with the Montreal Canadiens, Washington Capitals, Los Angeles Kings, and Toronto Maple Leafs between 1981 and 1989.

== Biography ==
Laughlin was born in Toronto, Ontario. As a youth, he played in the 1970 Quebec International Pee-Wee Hockey Tournament with a minor ice hockey team from Toronto.

Laughlin was drafted in 1977 by the Montreal Canadiens. He played for several years with the Nova Scotia Voyageurs of the American Hockey League, Montreal's minor league affiliate, before he made it onto the Canadiens' roster for part of the 1981–82 season. In September 1982, Laughlin was traded to the Washington Capitals as part of a six-player blockbuster trade that sent him, Brian Engblom, Doug Jarvis and Rod Langway to Washington in exchange for Rick Green and Ryan Walter.

Laughlin got an opportunity to establish himself as a full-time player with the Capitals. His contributions helped guide the Capitals to their first playoff appearance in team history. Laughlin also served as a team ambassador during his tenure with the Capitals, often making appearances in the Washington, D.C., area to help grow the team's footprint in the region.

Laughlin was traded to the Los Angeles Kings on February 9, 1988, in exchange for Grant Ledyard. He played the 1988–89 season, his final season in the NHL, for the Toronto Maple Leafs. Laughlin would play one season for EV Landshut of the German Hockey League before retiring from active play. In 549 NHL games, Laughlin scored 136 goals and had 205 assists.

Laughlin has been the television color analyst for Capitals games since 1990, where he has paired with Joe Beninati since 1994. He also participates in many Capitals Alumni activities and is involved in charity work in the Washington, D.C., area.

Laughlin played collegiate hockey at Clarkson University; his uniform #22 is retired by the school.

Laughlin and his wife Linda have two children, Courtney and Kyle. The family resides in Anne Arundel County, Maryland.

Laughlin underwent cardiac surgery on February 4, 2025. Initial indications are that the procedure was successful.

== Career statistics ==
=== Regular season and playoffs ===
			Regular season					Playoffs
Season	Team	League	GP	G	A	Pts	PIM	GP	G	A	Pts	PIM
1976–77	Clarkson University	NCAA	33	12	13	25	44	—	—	—	—	—
1977–78	Clarkson University	NCAA	30	17	31	48	56	—	—	—	—	—
1978–79	Clarkson University	NCAA	30	18	29	47	22	—	—	—	—	—
1979–80	Clarkson University	NCAA	34	18	30	48	38	—	—	—	—	—
1979–80	Nova Scotia Voyageurs	AHL	2	0	0	0	2	—	—	—	—	—
1980–81	Nova Scotia Voyageurs	AHL	46	32	29	61	15	6	0	1	1	6
1981–82	Montreal Canadiens	NHL	36	12	11	23	33	3	0	1	1	0
1981–82	Nova Scotia Voyageurs	AHL	26	14	15	29	16	—	—	—	—	—
1982–83	Washington Capitals	NHL	75	17	27	44	41	4	1	0	1	0
1983–84	Washington Capitals	NHL	80	20	32	52	69	8	4	2	6	6
1984–85	Washington Capitals	NHL	78	16	34	50	38	5	0	0	0	2
1985–86	Washington Capitals	NHL	75	30	45	75	43	9	1	2	3	10
1986–87	Washington Capitals	NHL	80	22	30	52	67	1	0	0	0	0
1987–88	Washington Capitals	NHL	40	5	5	10	26	—	—	—	—	—
1987–88	Los Angeles Kings	NHL	19	4	8	12	6	3	0	1	1	2
1988–89	Toronto Maple Leafs	NHL	66	10	13	23	41	—	—	—	—	—
1989–90	EV Landshut	Germany	35	22	11	33	80	18	10	37	47	10
NHL totals			549	136	205	341	364	33	6	6	12	20
