= Joe Beninati =

American sportscaster (born 1965)

- Born: November 14, 1965 (age 61); Long Island, New York, U.S.
- Occupation: Sportscaster

Joseph Edward Beninati (born November 14, 1965) is an American sportscaster who serves as the television play-by-play announcer for the National Hockey League's Washington Capitals. Along with Capitals television color analyst Craig Laughlin and "Inside the Glass" reporter Alan May, he provides Capitals game coverage for Monumental Sports Network. Beninati has been with the Washington Capitals since 1994. When not behind the microphone for the Capitals, he's often heard as the play-by-play voice of Men and Women's Lacrosse on ESPNU and The Big Ten Network (BTN). In addition, he serves as the lead PxP voice for Athletes Unlimited PRO Lacrosse (a player first league with an innovative scoring system). Beninati has done freelance announcing for ESPN, ESPNU, Westwood One, WFAN as well as being one of the prominent hockey voices on Versus (now NBCSN). Before his time with NBC Sports and the Capitals, he covered the Providence Bruins; the AHL affiliate of the Boston Bruins.

== Biography ==
=== Early life and college ===
Beninati grew up on Long Island, listening to Marv Albert broadcasting Knicks and Rangers games. He attended Bowdoin College, where he still holds the school record for saves in a season (263) by a lacrosse goaltender.

=== Broadcasting ===
Beninati started broadcasting when he was injured playing hockey and some friends talked him into appearing on the school's radio station, WBOR. The following year, he began doing play-by-play of local high school events. He later served as a sports information director. Out of college, he was hired to broadcast American Hockey League games, where he rode buses for five years.

=== Other sports ===
In addition to ice hockey coverage, he often serves as play-by-play for men's and women's college and professional lacrosse on ESPN. He also appears on the Big Ten Network where he provides play-by-play coverage for college football.

Beninati has also filled in for coverage of the Washington Wizards and Washington Mystics, and formerly the Baltimore Orioles.
