= Washington Capitals =

National Hockey League team in Washington, D.C.

- 2026–27 Washington Capitals season
- Conference: Eastern
- Division: Metropolitan
- Founded: 1974
- History: Washington Capitals; 1974–present
- Home arena: Capital One Arena
- City: Washington, D.C.
- Team colors: Red, white, blue
- Media: Monumental Sports Network; WRC (NBC 4); Federal News Radio (1500 AM); The Fan (106.7 FM)
- Owner: Monumental Sports & Entertainment (Ted Leonsis)
- General manager: Chris Patrick
- Head coach: Spencer Carbery
- Captain: Alexander Ovechkin
- Minor league affiliates: Hershey Bears (AHL); South Carolina Stingrays (ECHL)
- Stanley Cups: 1 (2017–18)
- Conference championships: 2 (1997–98, 2017–18)
- Presidents' Trophies: 3 (2009–10, 2015–16, 2016–17)
- Division championships: 14 (1988–89, 1999–00, 2000–01, 2007–08, 2008–09, 2009–10, 2010–11, 2012–13, 2015–16, 2016–17, 2017–18, 2018–19, 2019–20, 2024–25)
- Official website: nhl.com/capitals

The Washington Capitals (colloquially known as the Caps) are a professional ice hockey team based in Washington, D.C. The Capitals compete in the National Hockey League (NHL) as a member of the Metropolitan Division in the Eastern Conference. The team is owned by Ted Leonsis, through Monumental Sports & Entertainment, and initially played its home games at the Capital Centre in Landover, Maryland, before moving to Capital One Arena in Washington, D.C., in 1997.

The franchise was founded in 1974 as an expansion team, alongside the Kansas City Scouts, and struggled throughout its first eight years of existence. Beginning in 1982, with a core of players such as Mike Gartner, Rod Langway, Larry Murphy, and Scott Stevens, they became a regular playoff contender for the next 14 seasons. After purchasing the team in 1999, Leonsis revitalized the franchise by drafting star players such as Alexander Ovechkin, Nicklas Bäckström, John Carlson, Braden Holtby, Evgeny Kuznetsov and Tom Wilson. In the 2009–10 season, the Capitals won the franchise's first Presidents' Trophy for being the team with the most points at the end of the regular season. They won it a second time in 2015–16, and for a third time the following season in 2016–17. In addition to 14 division titles and three Presidents' Trophies, the Capitals have reached the Stanley Cup Final in 1998 and 2018, winning the latter in five games against the Vegas Golden Knights.

The Capitals have retired the use of four numbers in honor of four players. In addition, the team holds an association with a number of individuals inducted into the Hockey Hall of Fame. The Capitals are affiliated with two minor league teams: the Hershey Bears of the American Hockey League and the South Carolina Stingrays of the ECHL.

== History ==
=== Early years (1974–1982) ===
The NHL awarded an expansion franchise to the city of Washington on June 8, 1972, and the Capitals joined the NHL as an expansion team for the 1974–75 season along with the Kansas City Scouts. The Capitals were owned by Abe Pollin (also owner of the National Basketball Association's Washington Bullets/Wizards). Pollin had built the Capital Centre in suburban Landover, Maryland, to house both the Bullets (who formerly played in Baltimore) and the Capitals. His first act as owner was to hire Hall of Famer Milt Schmidt as general manager. The team name was decided via a contest in which 12,000 entries were given to Pollin. Other names included the Comets, Cyclones, Streaks, and Domes. Jim Anderson was hired as head coach prior to the inaugural season.

With a combined 30 teams between the NHL and the World Hockey Association (WHA), the available talent was stretched thin. The Capitals had few players with significant NHL experience and were at a disadvantage against the long-standing teams that were stocked with veteran players.

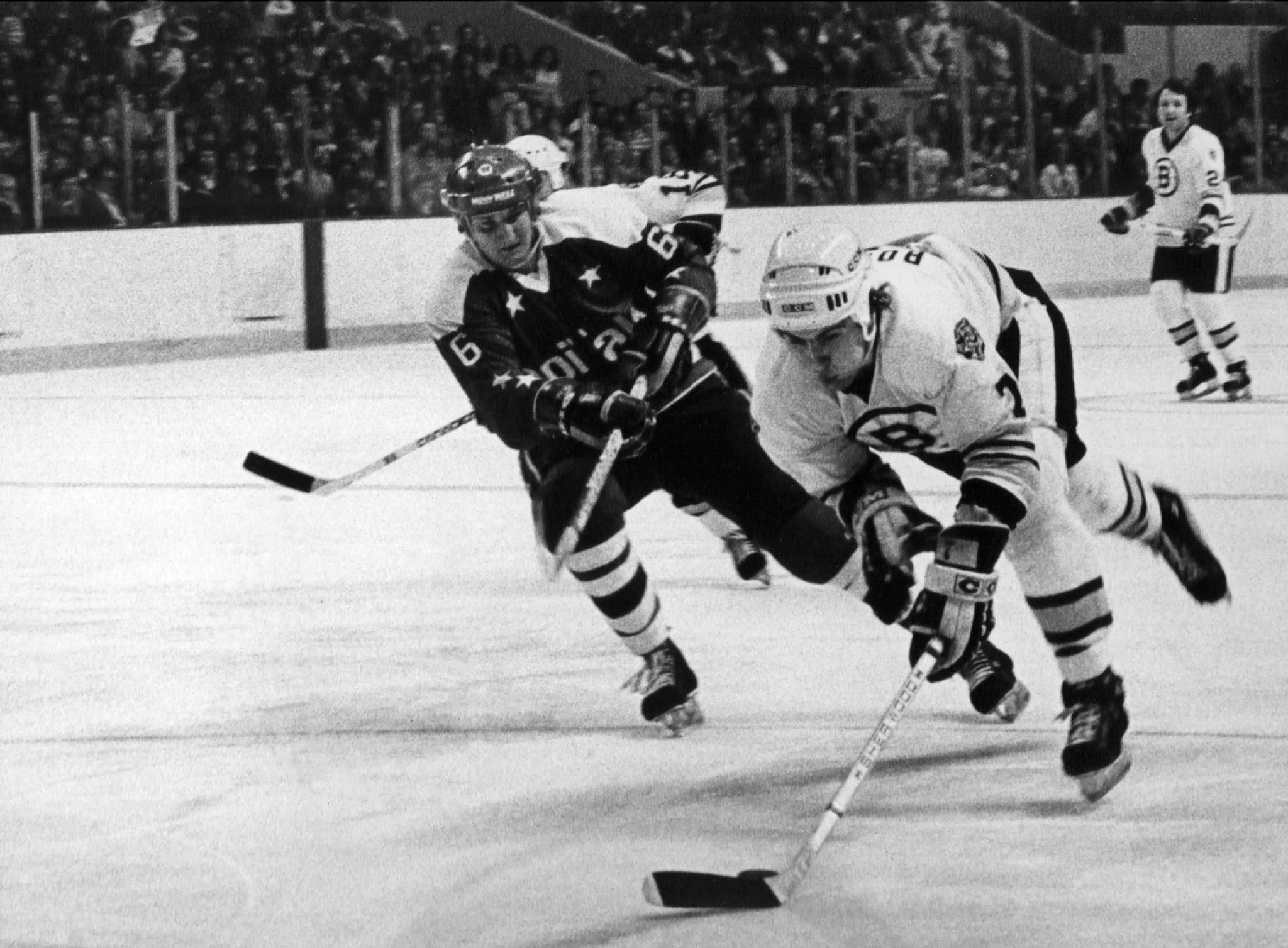
Capitals defenseman Darren Veitch chasing Boston Bruins defenseman Ray Bourque in 1980

The Capitals' inaugural season in 1974–75 set NHL records in futility. They finished last in the league with a 8–67–5 record; their 21 points were half that of their expansion brethren, the Scouts. The eight wins are the fewest for an NHL team playing at least 70 games, and the .131 winning percentage is still the worst in NHL history. They also set records for most road losses (39 out of 40), most consecutive road losses (37), and most consecutive losses (17). Head coach Jim Anderson said, "I'd rather find out my wife was cheating on me than keep losing like this. At least I could tell my wife to cut it out." Anderson was fired 54 games into the season and replaced by head scout Red Sullivan. Sullivan, after a 14-game losing streak, resigned citing stomach issues. Schmidt had to take over the coaching reins for the remainder of the season.

In 1975–76, Washington went 25 straight games without a win and allowed 394 goals en route to another horrendous record: 11–59–10 (32 points). In the middle of the season, Schmidt resigned and was replaced as general manager by Max McNab and as head coach by Tom McVie. After the season, along with the Scouts, both teams would travel to Tokyo and Sapporo, Japan for four exhibition games for the NHL's first games in an Asian country. For the rest of the 1970s and early 1980s, the Capitals alternated between dreadful seasons and finishing only a few points out of the Stanley Cup playoffs; in 1980, for instance, they were in playoff contention until the last day of the season. In 1978, the Capitals made a trade to acquire Dennis Maruk who would score 50 goals during the 1980–81 season and 60 goals in the 1981–82 season. Thanks to the subpar seasons, the Capitals were able to draft players Mike Gartner and Bobby Carpenter. However, McNab and coach Gary Green were fired in November 1981. Roger Crozier took over as GM for the remainder of the season, but he too was fired in August 1982. One of Crozier's decisions included the hiring of Bryan Murray.

By the summer of 1982, serious talk began of the heavily money-losing team leaving Washington before the next season. Fans started a "Save the Caps" ticket-buying campaign to drum up support for the team. Just before the August deadline by which Pollin said he would be forced to relocate (reported to take the form of a merger with the New Jersey Devils), the Prince George's County, Maryland council boosted the effort by voting to give the Caps a near-complete break from a heavy tax on admission to professional sporting events. Days later, Pollin announced new investing partners had signed on and confirmed he would be able to keep the team in Washington.

=== Postseason inconsistencies (1982–1996) ===
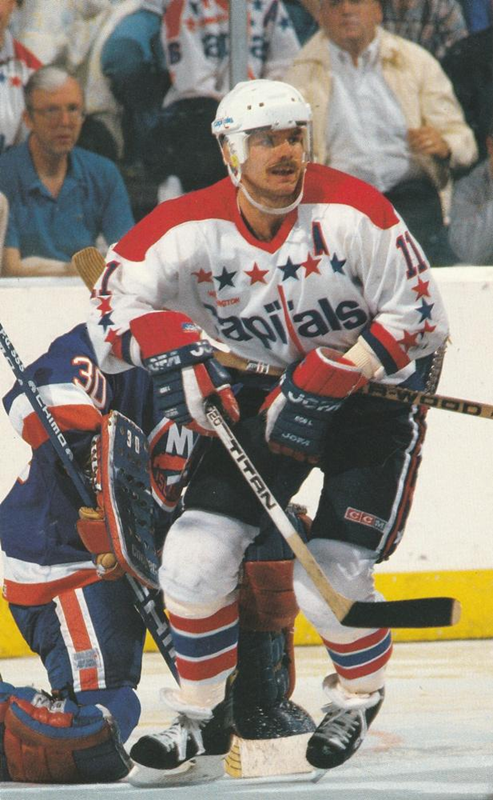
Mike Gartner helped lift the Capitals to becoming a playoff contender in the 1980s.

One of the new part-owners was Dick Patrick, on whose advice Pollin hired David Poile as general manager. As his first move, Poile pulled off one of the largest trades in franchise history on September 9, 1982, when he dealt captain Ryan Walter and Rick Green to the Montreal Canadiens in exchange for Rod Langway (named captain only a few weeks later), Brian Engblom, Doug Jarvis and Craig Laughlin. Another significant move was the drafting of defenseman Scott Stevens during the 1982 NHL entry draft (the pick was made by Crozier, prior to Poile's hiring). The result of both acquisitions helped the team get a third-place finish in the Patrick Division, which resulted in their first playoff appearance. Although they were eliminated by the three-time defending (and eventual) Stanley Cup champion Islanders three games to one, the Caps' dramatic turnaround ended any talk of the club leaving Washington.

In the 1983–84 offseason, the Capitals traded a first round draft pick for Dave Christian. They also traded Dennis Maruk to the Minnesota North Stars for a second round draft pick. The regular season had the Capitals gain over 100 points for the first time in their history. The Capitals also made a trade with the Los Angeles Kings sending Engblom and Ken Houston for Larry Murphy. They also made it to the second round of the playoffs, after defeating the Philadelphia Flyers in a three-game sweep. However, they were defeated by the Islanders in the second round. The Capitals matched their point total the following season, but had a two-game series lead in the first round disappear against the Islanders as Washington lost the next three games to lose the series. In 1985–86, the team had their best record yet, winning 50 games and earning 107 points. After defeating the Islanders in a three-game sweep, the Capitals were defeated by the New York Rangers in six games.

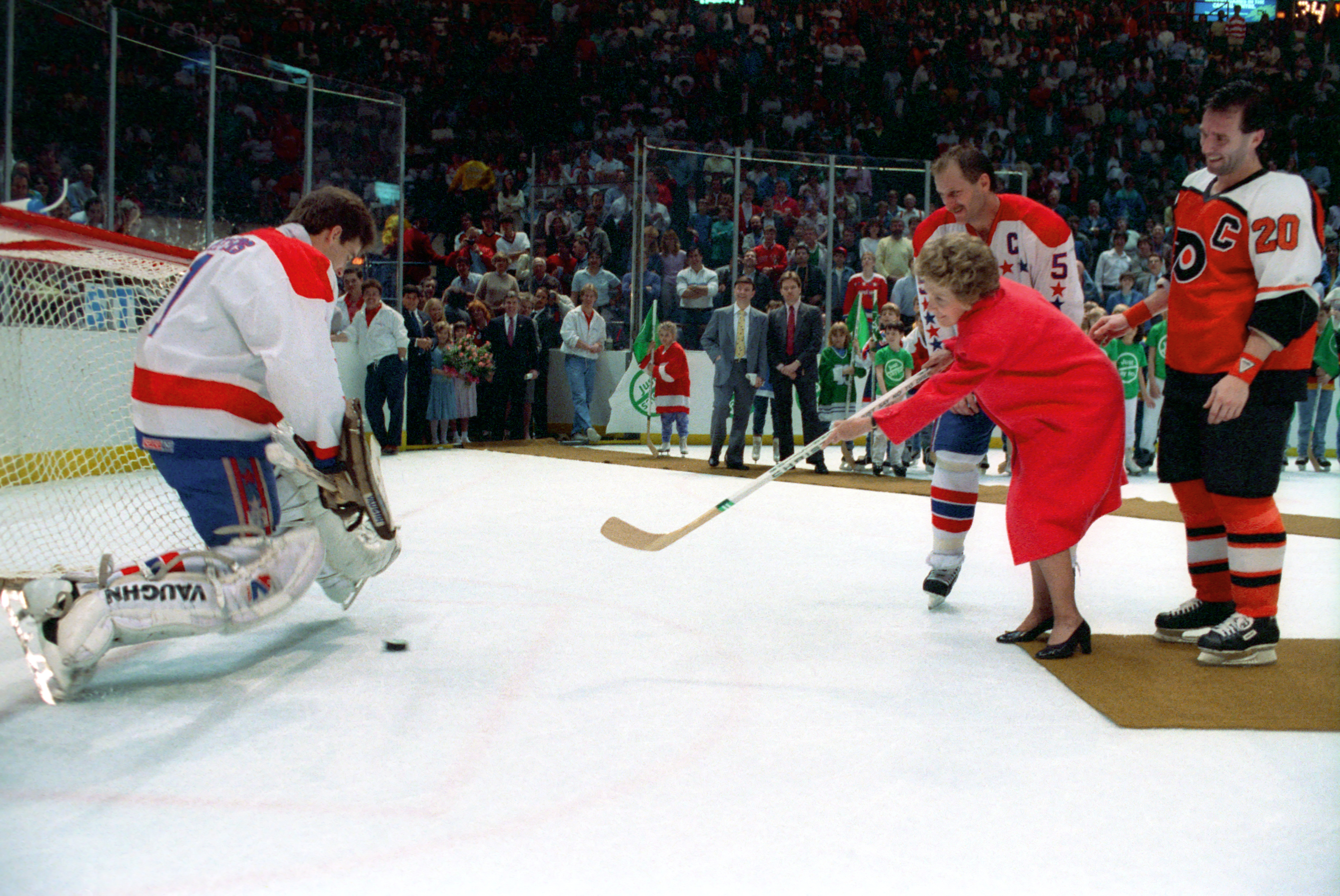
First Lady Nancy Reagan shooting a puck against Washington goaltender Pete Peeters while attending a Capitals–Flyers game in 1988

The 1986–87 season saw the team trade Bobby Carpenter and a second round draft pick for Bob Crawford, Kelly Miller, and Mike Ridley. However, the season ended with a loss to the Islanders in the division semifinals. The Capitals had a 3–1 series lead, but the Islanders came back to force game seven which would be known as the Easter Epic. In the fourth overtime, at 1:56 am on Easter Sunday 1987, Pat LaFontaine scored, giving the Islanders a 2–1 victory, ending the Capitals season.

At the 1987 NHL entry draft, the Capitals traded Gaetan Duchesne, Alan Haworth, and first round pick (who would become Joe Sakic) for Dale Hunter and Clint Malarchuk. The Capitals were unable to move past the second round for another season in 1988, losing the division finals against the New Jersey Devils. For the 1989 playoffs push, Gartner and Murphy were traded to the Minnesota North Stars in exchange for Dino Ciccarelli and defenseman Bob Rouse. However, they were eliminated in the first round by the Philadelphia Flyers.

In the 1989–90 season, Bryan Murray was fired and replaced by his brother, the assistant coach, Terry Murray. As they approached the deadline, the Capitals acquired goaltender Mike Liut who assisted in their playoff push. The Capitals finally made the conference finals in 1990, but went down in a four-game sweep at the hands of the first-place Boston Bruins. The next two seasons were undone by the Pittsburgh Penguins who defeated Washington both seasons in the playoffs. It included a series where the Capitals had a 3–1 series lead in 1992 only to lose the next three games and the series. Their final season with Langway did not end well for himself nor the Capitals. He was limited to 21 games in the 1992–93 season due to a torn cartilage injury. In the playoffs, they lost in six games to the Islanders in the division semifinals. In game six of the series, Dale Hunter hit Pierre Turgeon after Turgeon scored the 6–1 goal for the Islanders. Hunter was given a 21-game suspension the following season as a result.

At the 1993 draft, Craig Berube was acquired from the Calgary Flames in return for a fifth round draft pick. In 1993–94, the Capitals struggled throughout the first half of the season which culminated in Terry Murray's dismissal as head coach and Jim Schoenfeld announced as his replacement. Approaching the trade deadline, the Capitals acquired Joé Juneau. Although the Capitals defeated the Penguins in the conference quarterfinals, they were defeated in five games by the Rangers in the conference semifinals. At the 1994 NHL entry draft, Mike Ridley was traded along with a first round pick for Rob Pearson and the tenth overall pick, which was used to select Nolan Baumgartner. However, their rival, the Penguins, would defeat them in the first round of both the 1995 and 1996 playoffs. Both series had the Capitals leading the series, including a 3–1 series lead in 1995—the 1996 series ended with a game six fourth overtime goal by Pittsburgh forward Petr Nedvěd. In the 1996–97 season, David Poile completed a blockbuster trade with the Bruins to acquire forwards Adam Oates and Rick Tocchet along with goaltender Bill Ranford for Jason Allison, Jim Carey, Anson Carter, and two draft picks. However, the team was unable to make the 1997 playoffs, and as a result, Poile was fired along with Schoenfeld.

=== Stanley Cup Final appearance and rebuild (1997–2005) ===
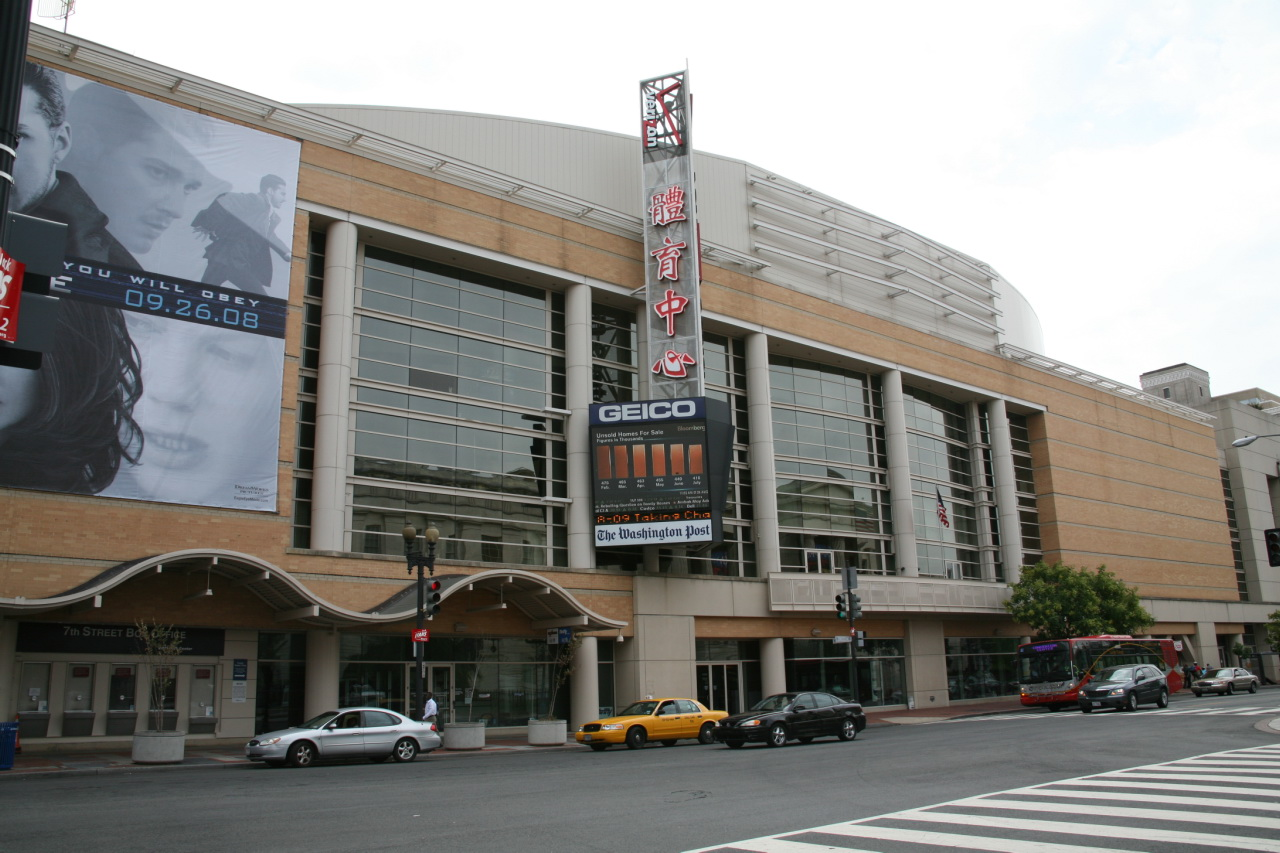
The Capitals moved into the MCI Center (presently Capital One Arena) in 1997.

In 1997–98, the Capitals hired general manager George McPhee as well as Ron Wilson as the next head coach. Midway through the season, they moved to MCI Center, now Capital One Arena, their current home arena. Peter Bondra led the team with 52 goals in the regular season. In the 1998, the Caps got past the Boston Bruins, Ottawa Senators, and Buffalo Sabres en route to the team's first Stanley Cup Final appearance. However, the team was outmatched by the defending champions, the Detroit Red Wings, who won in a four-game sweep. During the game two of the series, Esa Tikkanen forced Detroit goaltender Chris Osgood out of position but slid the puck past the open net, which led to the Red Wings' comeback in the game. That same season, Oates, Phil Housley, and Hunter all scored their 1,000th career point, the only time in NHL history that one team had three players reach that same milestone in a single season.

After their 1998 Stanley Cup run, the Capitals finished the 1998–99 season with a record of 31–45–6 and failed to qualify for the playoffs. They also traded out Ranford, Berube, Juneau, and captain Dale Hunter. During the season, the team was sold to a group headed by America Online (AOL) executive Ted Leonsis.

The Capitals went on to win back-to-back Southeast Division titles in 2000 and 2001, yet both years lost in the first round of the playoffs to the Penguins. The 2000–01 season also saw the Capitals acquire Trevor Linden and Dainius Zubrus from the Montreal Canadiens. However, after the playoffs, Adam Oates demanded a trade, feeling he was no longer an important part of the team with Linden playing. Management refused to trade Oates and stripped him of his team captaincy.

In the summer of 2001, the Capitals landed five-time Art Ross Trophy winner Jaromír Jágr through a trade with the Penguins. Jagr was then signed to the largest contract ever in NHL history—$77 million over seven years at an average salary of $11 million per year (over $134,000 per game) with an option for an eighth year. During the 2001–02 season, Linden was dealt to the Vancouver Canucks. Oates finally received his trade request, going to the Philadelphia Flyers in exchange for a prospect and three draft picks. The Capitals failed to defend their division title and missed the playoffs in 2002 despite a winning record. Jagr's point total also dropped from 121 the season prior to 79. Ron Wilson was fired as head coach.

Before the 2002–03 season, the Caps made more roster changes, including the signing of Robert Lang as a free agent, a linemate of Jagr's from Pittsburgh. The Capitals also hired Grand Rapids Griffins coach Bruce Cassidy as head coach. Washington returned to the playoffs in 2003, but lost in six games to the Tampa Bay Lightning after starting off with a two-game lead.

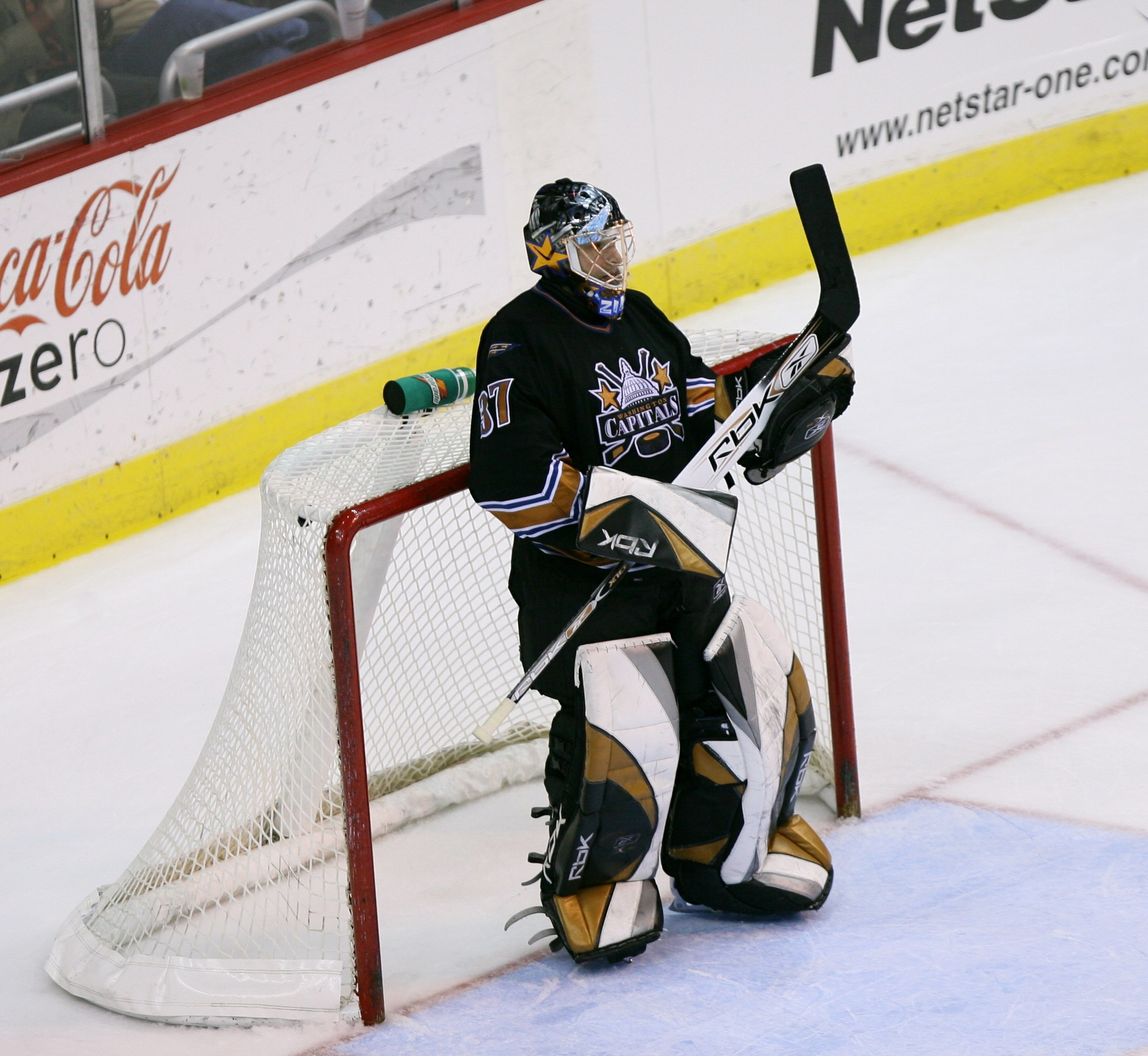
Kolzig was among Washington's best players between the late 1990s and early 2000s.

In the 2003–04 season, the Caps unloaded much of their high-priced talent. It started with Jagr moving to the New York Rangers for Anson Carter. As a stipulation of the trade, agreement Washington agreed to pay $20 million of Jagr's contract. This was quickly followed by Peter Bondra departing for the Ottawa Senators. Not long after, Robert Lang was sent to the Detroit Red Wings, as well as Sergei Gonchar to the Boston Bruins. The Capitals fired Cassidy and replaced him with Glen Hanlon; Washington ended the year 23–46–10–3.

In the 2004 NHL entry draft, the Capitals won the draft lottery, moving ahead of the Pittsburgh Penguins, who held the NHL's worst record, and selected Alexander Ovechkin first overall. During the NHL labor dispute of 2004–05, which cost the NHL its entire season, Ovechkin stayed in Russia, playing for Dynamo Moscow. The Capitals' 2005 offseason consisted of making D.C.-area native Halpern the team's captain.

=== Ovechkin–Backstrom era (2005–present) ===
==== Returning to the playoffs (2005–2015) ====
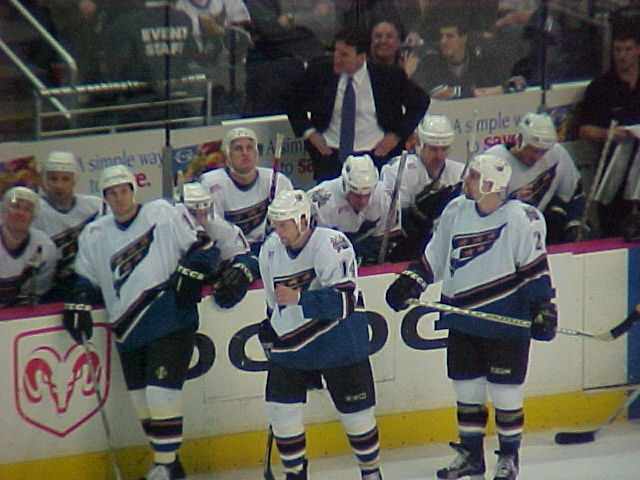
The Capitals bench in 2005

The Capitals finished the 2005–06 season with a 29–41–12 campaign. In his rookie season, Ovechkin led all 2005–06 rookies in goals with 52 and points with 106. Ovechkin became the first player since Teemu Selänne to score at least 50 goals in his rookie season. His efforts won him the Calder Memorial Trophy. Despite missing the playoffs, the Capitals had an 11-point improvement over the prior season.

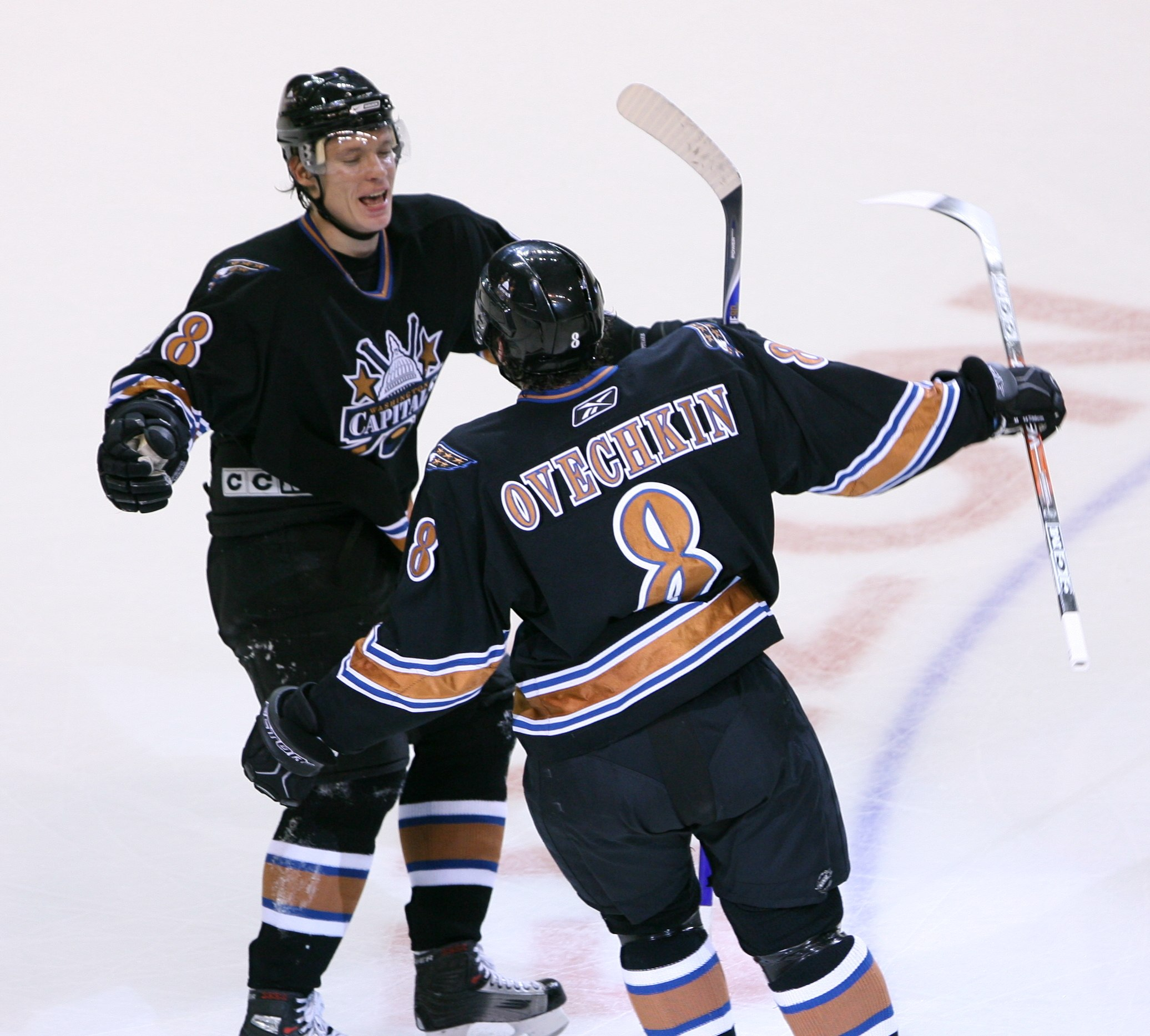
Alexander Semin and Alexander Ovechkin celebrate following a goal in January 2007.

In the 2006 offseason, Halpern left the Capitals to join the Dallas Stars; Chris Clark subsequently became the Capitals' new captain. Richard Zedník returned to the Capitals in 2006–07, but was later dealt at the trade deadline to the New York Islanders after an injury-plagued season. Despite the transactions, the Capitals finished with the same point total (70) in 2006–07 as they did the year before, although they won one fewer game. Ovechkin was the Capitals' lone representative in the season's All-Star Game. Washington's campaign also saw the breakout of Alexander Semin, who notched 38 goals in only his second NHL season.

In the 2007–08 offseason, the Capitals signed Swedish forward Nicklas Bäckström, the fourth overall pick in the 2006 NHL entry draft, to a three-year entry-level contract. They also signed 19-year-old goaltender Semyon Varlamov to a three-year entry-level contract. After starting the season 6–14–1, the Capitals fired head coach Glen Hanlon and replaced him with Hershey Bears head coach Bruce Boudreau. On January 10, 2008, the Capitals signed Ovechkin to an NHL-record $124 million contract extension at 13 years, the second-longest term of any contract in the NHL after New York Islanders goaltender Rick DiPietro's 15-year contract. Aided by key acquisitions at the trade deadline (Matt Cooke, Sergei Fedorov, and Cristobal Huet), Ovechkin's NHL-leading 65 goals, and Mike Green's league defensemen-leading 18 goals, the Capitals won the Southeast Division title for the first time since the 2000–01 season, edging out the Carolina Hurricanes for the division title on the final game of the season. Washington's remarkable end-of-season run included winning 11 of the final 12 regular season games. The Capitals became the first team in NHL history to make the playoffs after being ranked 14th or lower in their conference standings at the season's midpoint. For the postseason, the Capitals played against the Philadelphia Flyers in the first round and managed to force a game seven after being down three games to one in the series. However, they ultimately lost to the Flyers 3–2 in overtime. The accolades for the team continued to grow after the end of the season. Ovechkin won the Art Ross Trophy, the Maurice "Rocket" Richard Trophy, the Hart Memorial Trophy, and the Lester B. Pearson Award, becoming the first player in NHL history to win all four awards in the same season. Nicklas Bäckström was a finalist for the Calder Trophy, but ended up second to the Chicago Blackhawks' Patrick Kane. In addition to player awards, head coach Bruce Boudreau won the Jack Adams Award for the NHL's coach of the year. However, at free agency, the leading Capitals goaltender in games played, wins, save percentage, and shutouts, Olaf Kölzig left the team to join the Tampa Bay Lightning.

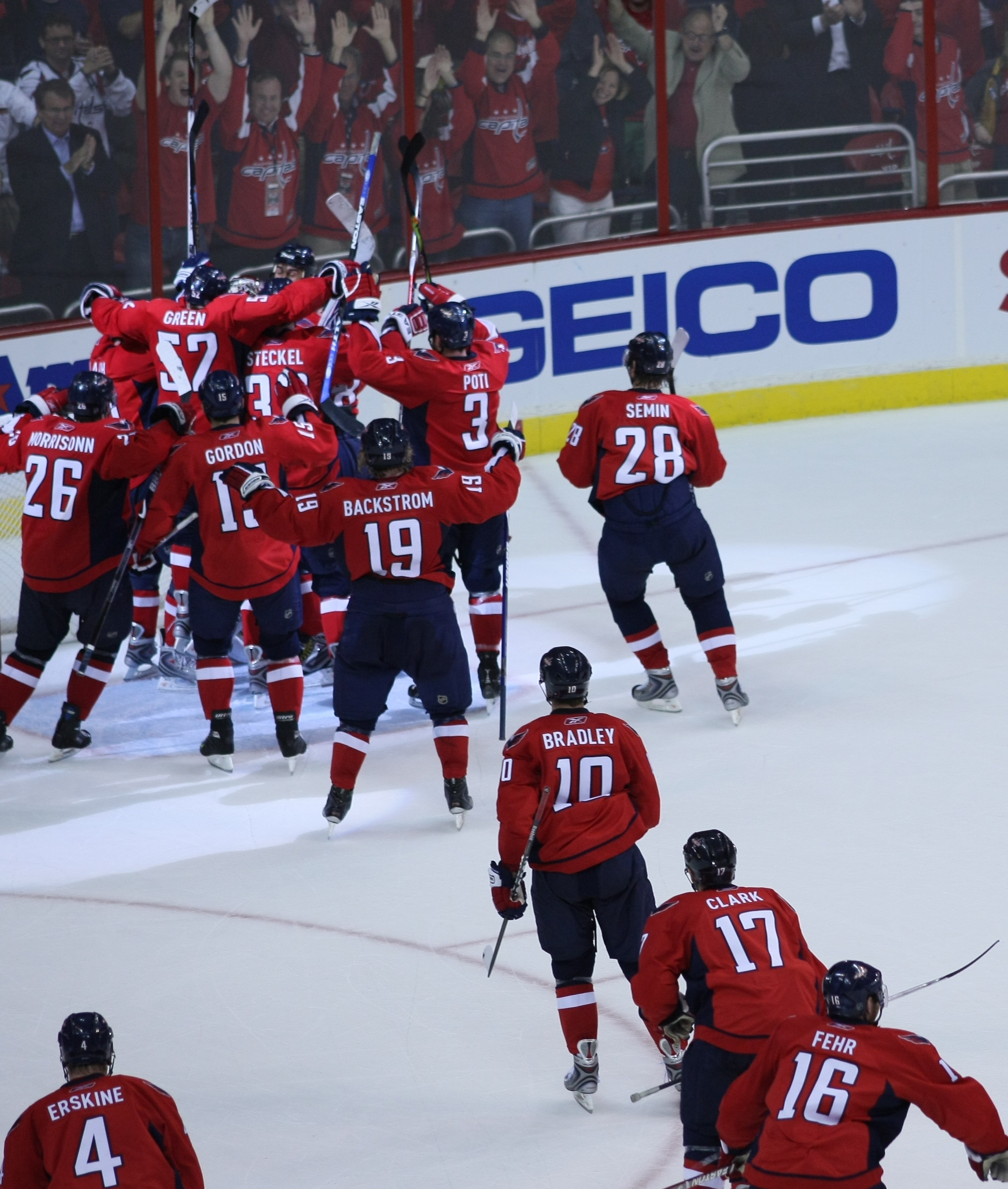
The Capitals celebrate after defeating the New York Rangers in the first round of the 2009 Stanley Cup playoffs.

The 2008–09 season was highlighted by the play of Mike Green and Ovechkin. Green led all NHL defensemen in goals and points, also setting the record for the longest consecutive goal-scoring streak by a defenseman with eight games. Ovechkin won his second Hart Trophy, his second Lester B. Pearson Award, and his second Maurice "Rocket" Richard Trophy. The Capitals finished the regular season with a record of 50–24–8 and a team-record 108 points, and they won their second consecutive Southeast Division title. They then overcame a 3–1 series deficit against the New York Rangers in the first round of the 2009 playoffs. The Capitals were then defeated by the eventual Stanley Cup champions, the Pittsburgh Penguins, in the conference semifinals in seven games.

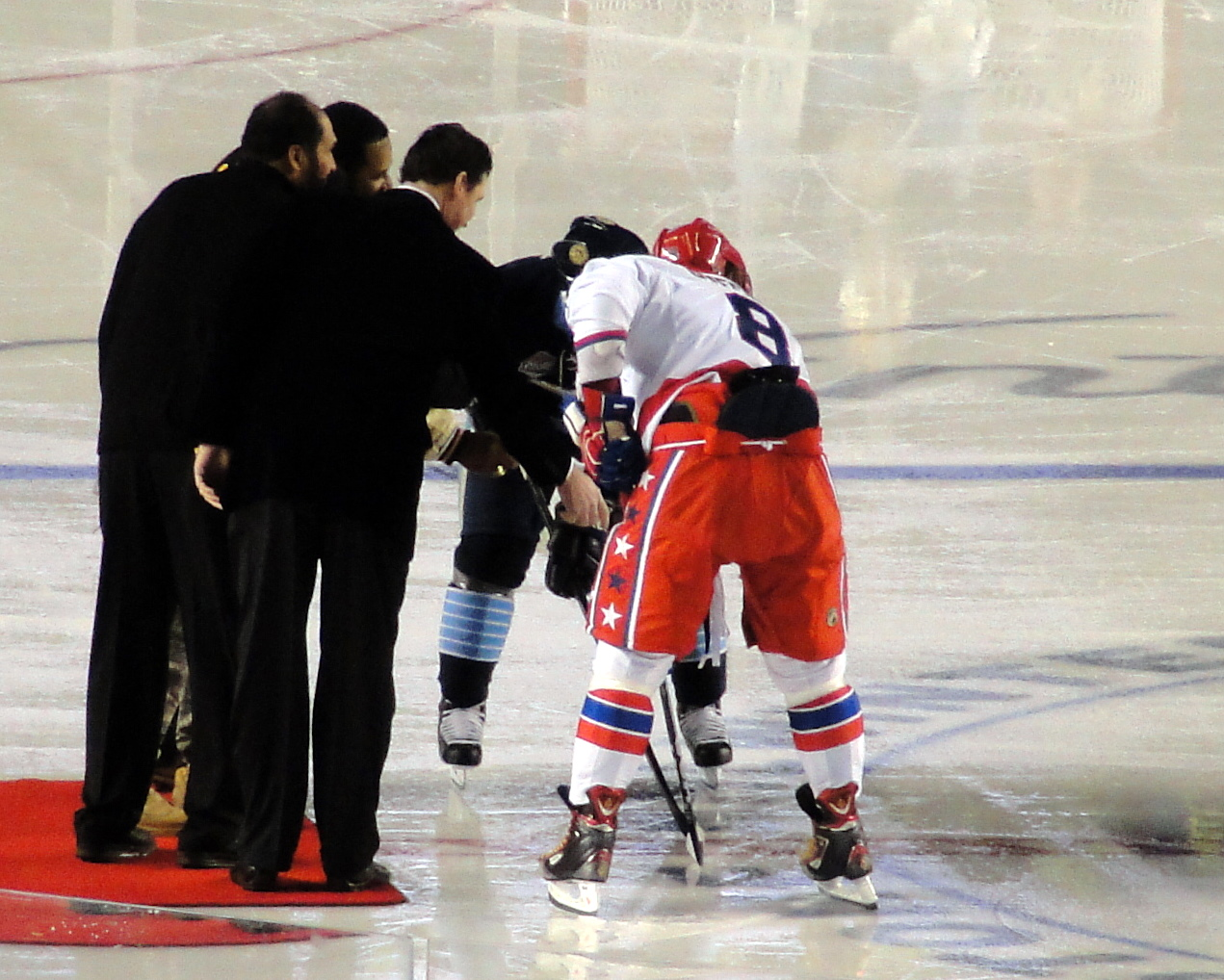
Ovechkin and Sidney Crosby taking the ceremonial puck drop before the 2011 Winter Classic

The Capitals finished the 2009–10 season first in the NHL with 121 points, thereby winning the Presidents' Trophy. Ovechkin led the team in points with 109. Backstrom finished with 101 points, fourth-most in the NHL. Once again, Mike Green led all defensemen in points, finishing with 76. Defenseman John Carlson made his NHL debut this season as well. Despite having a top-ranked regular season, the Capitals were defeated by the eighth-seeded Montreal Canadiens in the first round of the playoffs, giving up a 3–1 series lead in the process. Backstrom was given a ten-year contract extension after the season.

The 2010–11 season saw the Capitals repeat as the Southeast Division champions and as the top team in the Eastern Conference with 107 points. The season was highlighted by their participation in the 2011 Winter Classic, where they defeated the Pittsburgh Penguins 3–1 at Heinz Field. However, in the playoffs, after defeating the New York Rangers in five games in the conference quarterfinals, they were swept by the Tampa Bay Lightning in the conference semifinals.

The Capitals started the 2011–12 season with a record of 7–0, but they only won five of their next 15 games. As a result, general manager George McPhee fired head coach Boudreau, hiring Capitals legend Dale Hunter as his replacement. By the end of the 2011–12 season, the team's top two goaltenders, Michal Neuvirth and Tomáš Vokoun, were injured and the Capitals were required to lean on their goaltending prospect Braden Holtby to help the team into the 2012 playoffs. The Capitals finished with the seventh overall seed in East, drawing the defending champion Boston Bruins in the first round. The Capitals defeated the defending Stanley Cup champion and second-seeded Boston Bruins in seven games on an overtime goal by Joel Ward. Every game in the series was decided by a one-goal margin; previously, no single series in the Stanley Cup playoffs had ever gone as far as six or seven games while neither team ever held more than a one-goal lead. The Capitals then advanced to the second round to face the top-seeded New York Rangers. The series went seven games, ending with a 2–1 Rangers victory at Madison Square Garden. Following the season's end, head coach Dale Hunter announced he would step down. Adam Oates was later named head coach of the team.

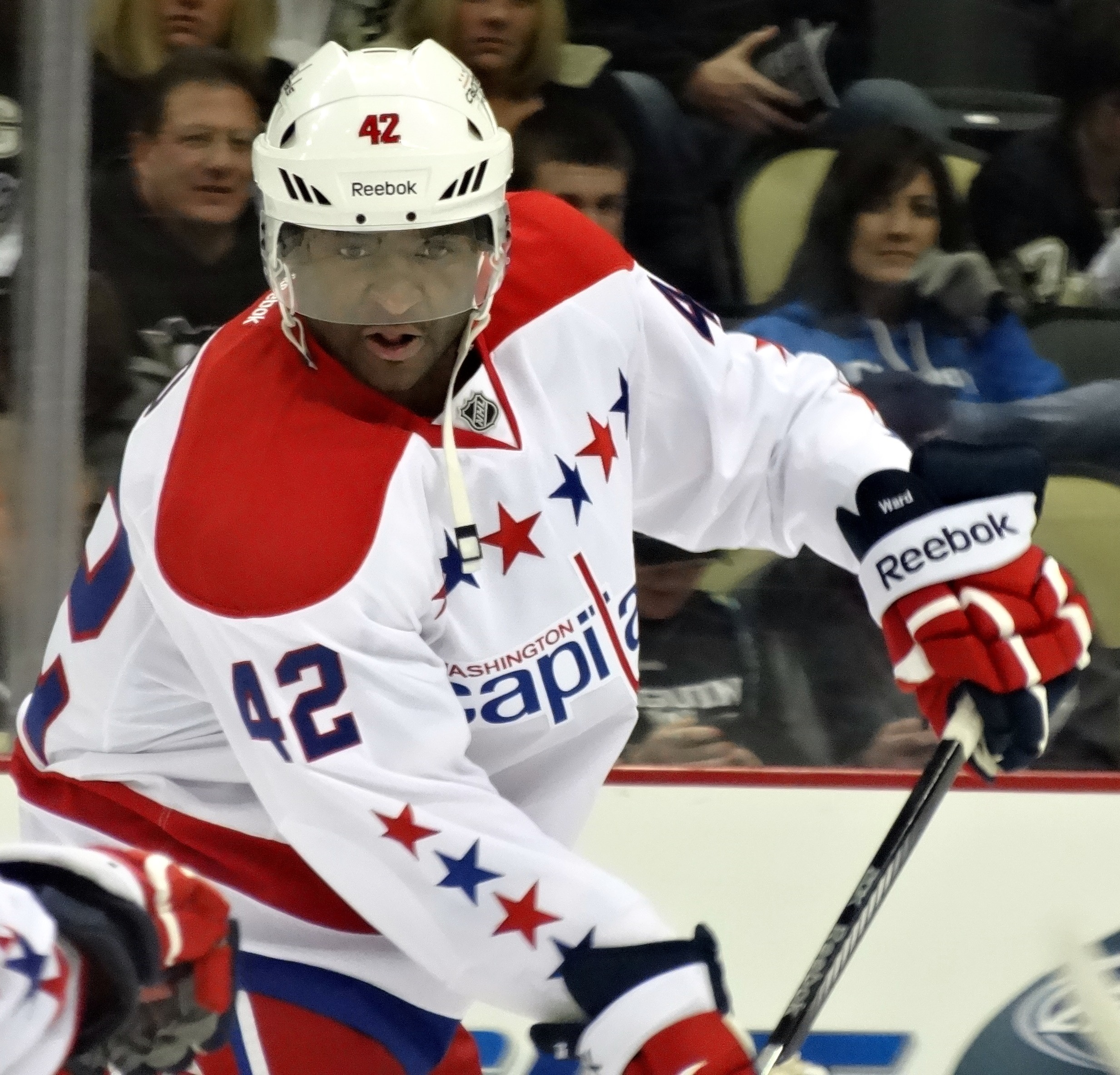
Joel Ward scored the overtime series-winning goal in game seven against a heavily favored defending Stanley Cup champion Boston Bruins in the opening round of the 2012 playoffs.

The lockout-shortened 2012–13 season saw the Capitals off to a rocky start, as they managed just two wins in their first ten games. The team rebounded to win the Southeast Division, earning the third seed in the Eastern Conference for the 2013 playoffs. However, in the playoffs, the Capitals' fell to the Rangers in seven games for the second consecutive season.

In the 2013–14 season, the Capitals struggled to stay in a playoff spot and ultimately missed the playoffs by just three points in the standings, resulting in them missing the playoffs for the first time since 2006–07. Evgeny Kuznetsov made his NHL debut during the season. On April 26, 2014, 15 days after the regular season ended, the Capitals announced they would not renew general manager George McPhee's contract and that they had fired head coach Adam Oates.

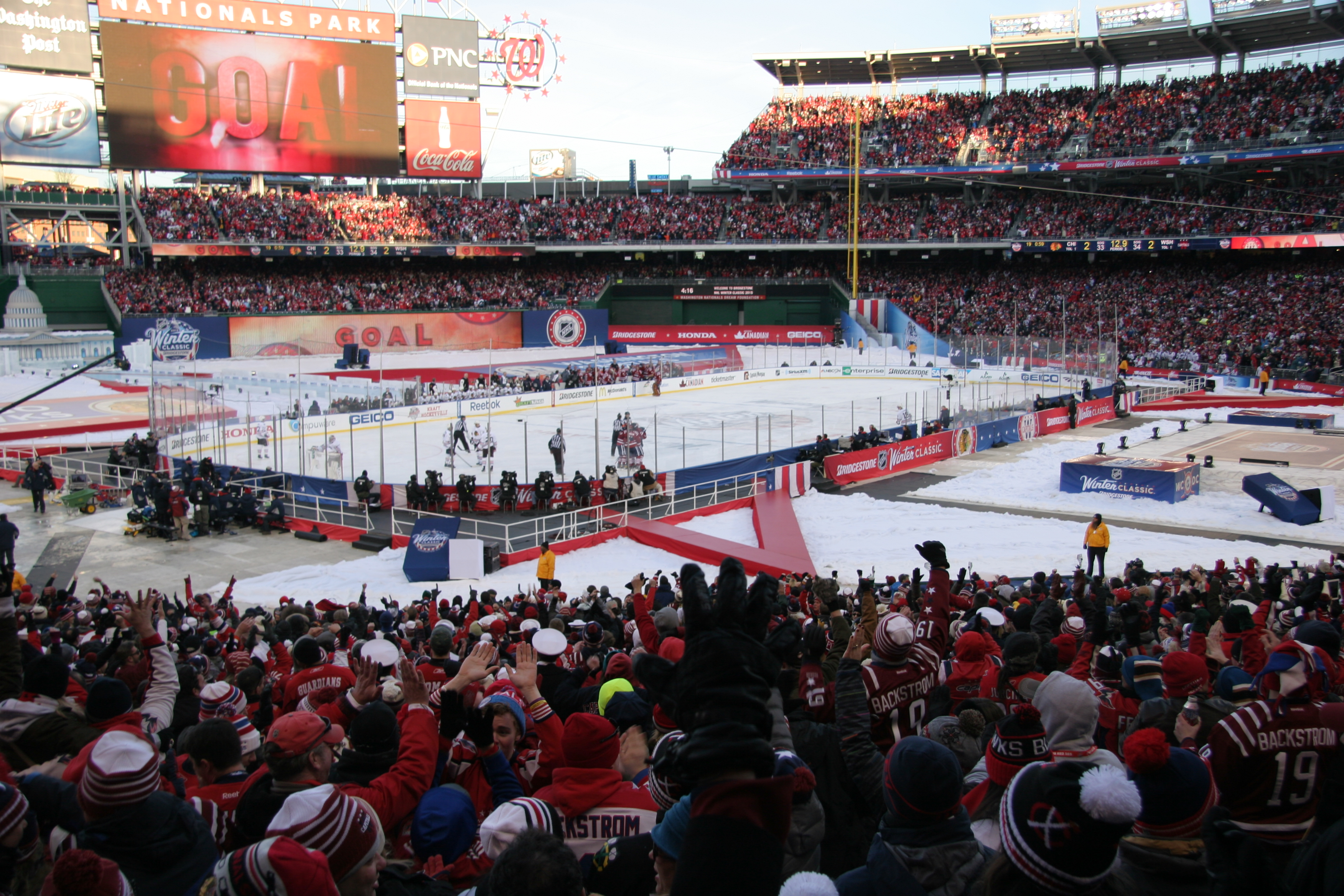
The Capitals hosted the Chicago Blackhawks for the 2015 Winter Classic at Nationals Park.

On May 26, 2014, the Capitals announced the promotion of Brian MacLellan from director of player personnel to general manager and the hiring of Barry Trotz as the new head coach. In Ovechkin's 691st NHL game on November 4, 2014, he became the Capitals' all-time points leader during a game against the Calgary Flames, surpassing Peter Bondra. On January 1, 2015, the Washington Capitals defeated the Chicago Blackhawks 3–2 in the 2015 Winter Classic at Nationals Park in Washington, D.C. In the 2015 playoffs, the Capitals defeated the Islanders in seven games in the first round. In the second round, the Capitals held a 3–1 series lead over the New York Rangers. However, for the fifth time in their history, they gave up the series lead, as the Rangers defeated the Capitals in game seven.

==== Back-to-back Presidents' Trophies and first Stanley Cup championship (2015–2018) ====
During the offseason of the 2015–16 season, Mike Green left in free agency and Justin Williams was acquired in free agency. The Capitals also traded Pheonix Copley and Troy Brouwer for T. J. Oshie with the St. Louis Blues. the Capitals finished in first place in the league with a record of 56–18–8 and 120 points. After defeating the Philadelphia Flyers in the first round, they faced their rival, the Pittsburgh Penguins, for the first time since 2009. The Penguins would win the series in six games.

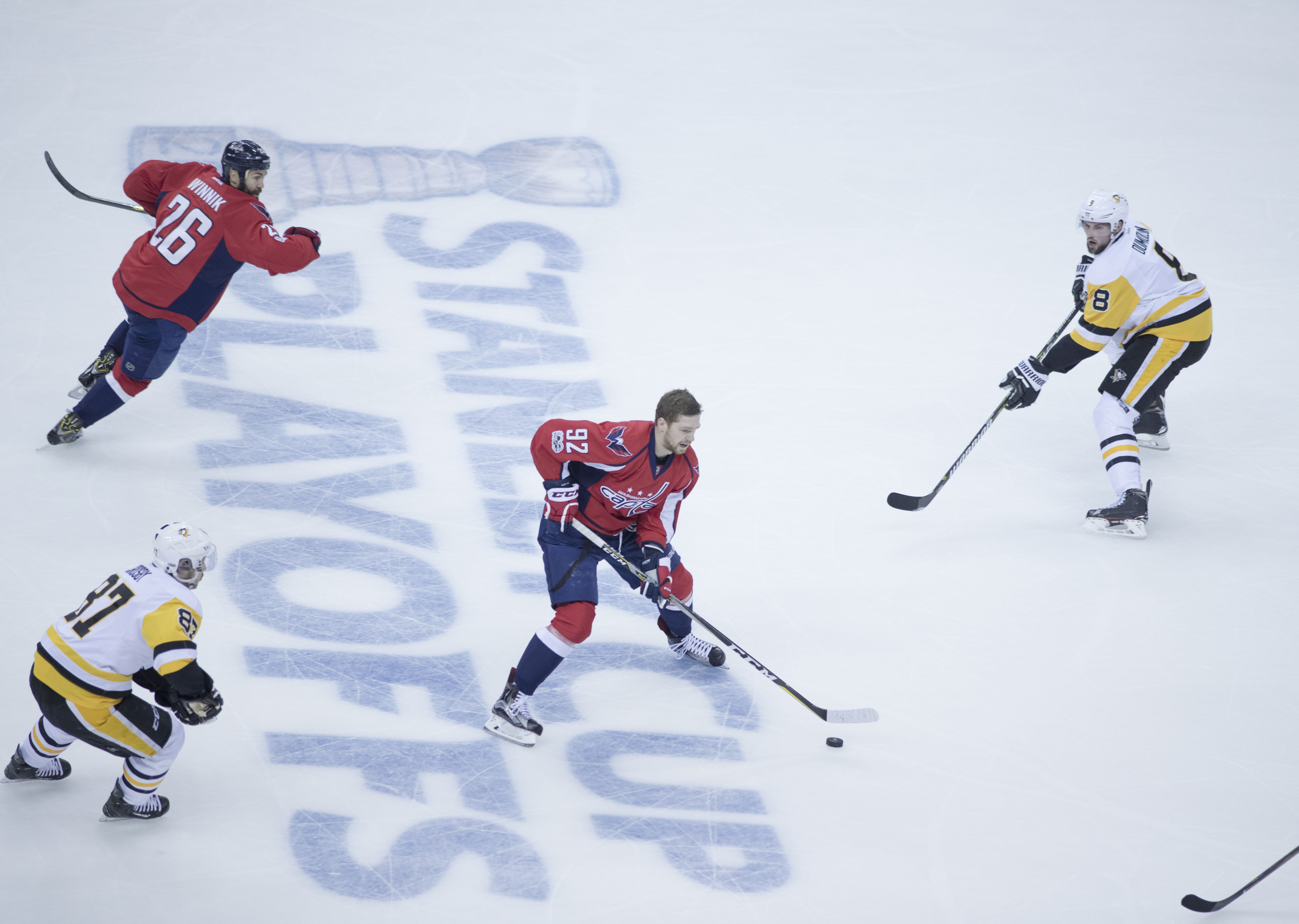
Evgeny Kuznetsov skating forward with the puck against the Penguins during the second round of the 2017 Stanley Cup playoffs

Ovechkin reached the 1,000-point milestone on January 11, 2017, with a goal against the Pittsburgh Penguins. Ovechkin was the 84th NHL player to reach the 1,000-point milestone, the fourth Russian-born player and the 37th player to reach the milestone while playing for one team throughout their NHL career. The Capitals won their second consecutive Presidents' Trophy, becoming just the seventh team in NHL history and the first time since the Vancouver Canucks in 2010–11 and 2011–12 to win back-to-back Presidents' Trophies. Ovechkin finished the 2016–17 season with 33 goals, leading the Capitals in goals for the twelfth straight season. Nearing the trade deadline, the Capitals traded with the Blues to acquire former Washington goaltender Pheonix Copley and defenseman Kevin Shattenkirk. In the 2017 playoffs, the Capitals defeated the eighth-seeded Toronto Maple Leafs in six games in the first round to set up a second consecutive showdown with the Pittsburgh Penguins in the second round. After falling behind 3–1 in the series, they battled back to force a game seven at home, where they were eliminated 2–0, and lost their series 4–3.

After the 2017 playoffs, the Capitals were unable to retain a number of players, losing Kevin Shattenkirk and Justin Williams to free agency, and defenseman Nate Schmidt to the 2017 NHL expansion draft. In addition, after signing Kuznetsov to long-term contract, the Capitals shipped Marcus Johansson to the New Jersey Devils to assist with the salary cap restrictions.

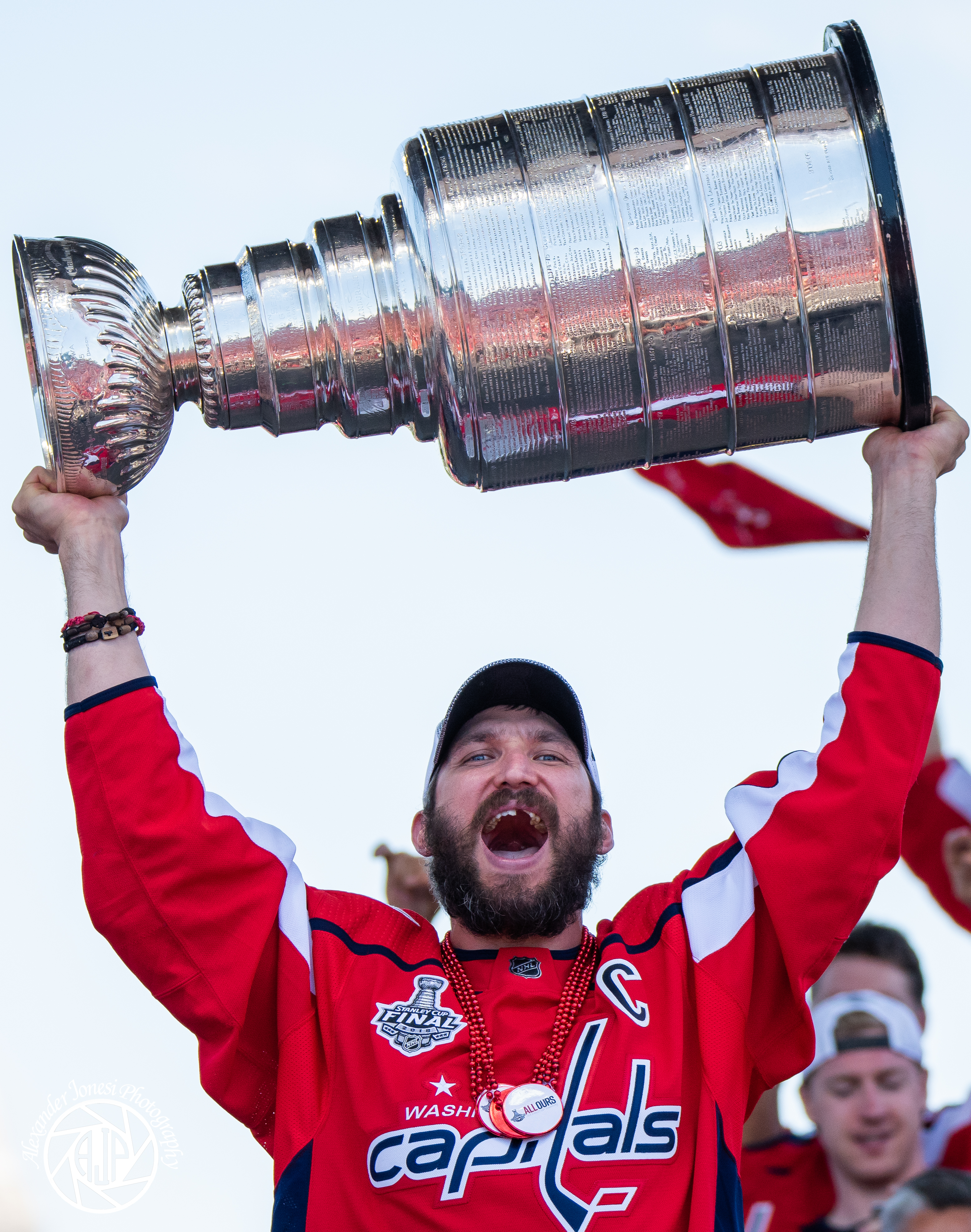
Ovechkin with the Stanley Cup at the National Mall, following the 2018 Stanley Cup Final

Despite a slow 5–6–1 start to the 2017–18 season, which extended out to 10–9–1, the Capitals went on a 10–2–2 run in December, and were able to clinch the Metropolitan Division for a third consecutive season on April 1. In the 2018 playoffs, the Capitals battled back from a 2–0 series deficit against the seventh-seeded Columbus Blue Jackets in the first round of the playoffs, winning four straight and beating the Blue Jackets in six games. They faced the Penguins again in the second round, and this time, they defeated the Penguins with an overtime goal by Evgeny Kuznetsov in game six. It marked the first time in 20 seasons that the Capitals made the conference finals and the first time in 24 seasons that they had defeated the Penguins in playoff series. The Capitals advanced to the 2018 Stanley Cup Final on May 23, after beating the top-seeded Tampa Bay Lightning in seven games. They then faced the expansion Vegas Golden Knights and overcame them in five games, including a 4–3 win in the decisive game five. Not only was it the Capitals' first Stanley Cup victory, but it was also the first championship for a Washington, D.C. team in one of the four major North American sports leagues since the Washington Redskins defeated the Buffalo Bills 26 years beforehand in Super Bowl XXVI. Shortly after the Stanley Cup Final, Barry Trotz resigned as the head coach of the Capitals, after negotiations for a contract extension fell through. Assistant coach Todd Reirden was named as Trotz's replacement on June 29.

==== Playoff struggles (2018–present) ====
During the 2018–19 season, the Capitals clinched their fourth straight Metropolitan Division title. In the 2019 playoffs, the Capitals efforts to repeat as champions ultimately fell short, as they were eliminated in the first round by the Carolina Hurricanes in seven games.

In the 2019–20 season, prior to the COVID-19 pandemic pausing the season, Ovechkin led the league in goals with 48 and scored his 700th goal on February 22, 2020. The Capitals clinched the division title at the time of the pause, but lost to the New York Islanders in the first round of the 2020 playoffs. Following the loss, Reirden was fired and replaced by Peter Laviolette. The Capitals also lost Braden Holtby to free agency, but gained veterans Henrik Lundqvist and Zdeno Chára. Lundqvist would not play a game with the Capitals due to a heart condition.

During the regular season of the 2020–21 season, the team made a trade with the Detroit Red Wings to acquire Anthony Mantha, trading out Richard Pánik, Jakub Vrána, and two draft picks. However, in the 2021 playoffs, they lost to the Boston Bruins in five games of the first round. In the 2021–22 season, the Capitals reacquired Marcus Johansson, trading Daniel Sprong and two draft picks. In the playoffs, they matched against the Presidents' Trophy-winning Florida Panthers in the first round, but fell to them in six games. The 2022–23 season saw the Capitals play against the Carolina Hurricanes in the 2023 NHL Stadium Series at Carter-Finley Stadium in Raleigh, North Carolina. The Hurricanes defeated the Capitals 4–1. Washington would also miss the playoffs for the first time since 2014. Following the season, the team and Laviolette agreed to mutually part ways. The Capitals hired 41-year-old Spencer Carbery to be their new head coach on May 30, 2023.

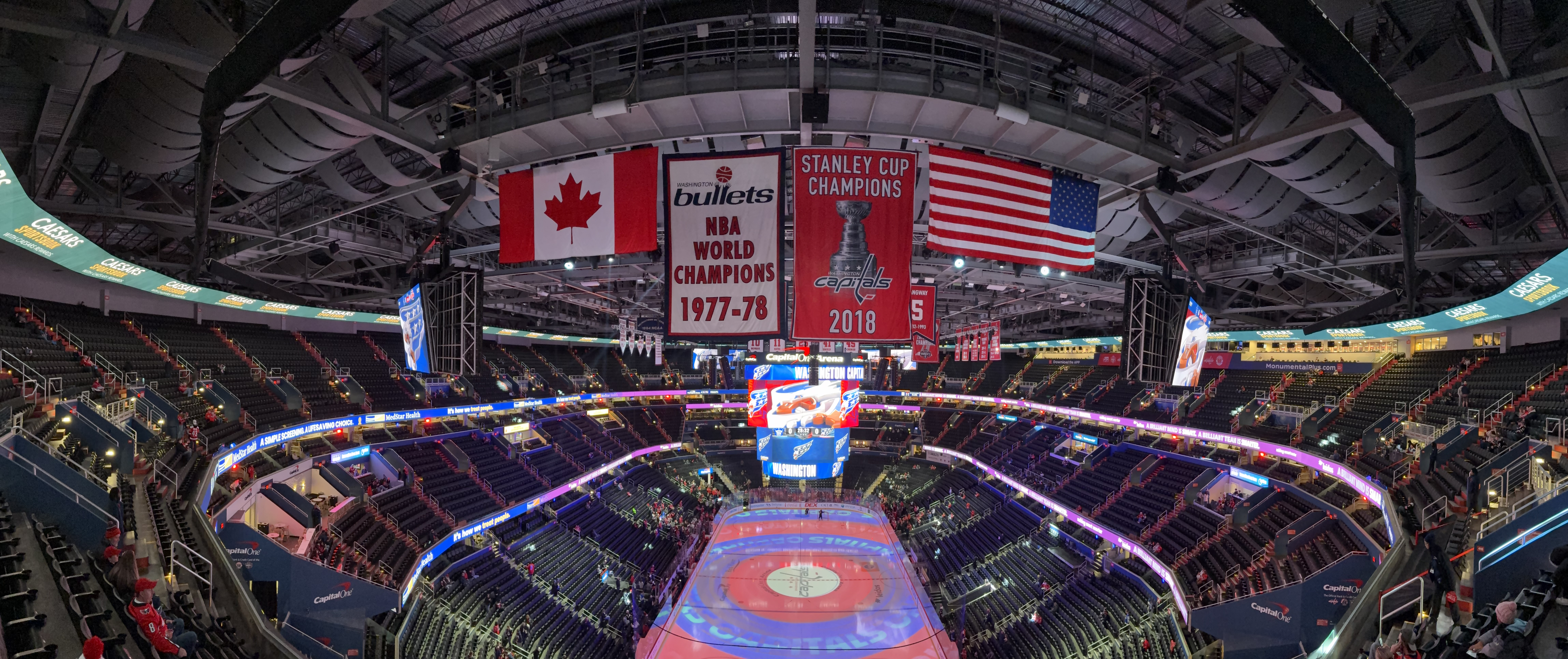
Panoramic view of Capital One Arena before the Toronto Maple Leafs @ Washington Capitals matchup on Black Friday 2025

In December 2023, Monumental Sports & Entertainment founder and team owner Ted Leonsis engaged in a non-binding partnership with Virginia governor Glenn Youngkin to move the Capitals and Washington Wizards to a planned arena in Potomac Yard in Alexandria, Virginia, by 2028. The structure would be part of an arts and entertainment district at the site, which would include a practice facility, restaurants, an esports venue, concert hall, and a new headquarters for Monumental. In March 2024, after $1.5 billion in proposed state funding for the stadium was voted down in the Virginia General Assembly, Washington mayor Muriel Bowser announced she had signed a deal with Leonsis to keep the Capitals and Wizards in the District "at least until 2050." The Capitals clinched the 2024 playoffs by beating the Philadelphia Flyers on April 16, finishing with a 40–31–11 record and the second wild card spot. They were swept by the Presidents' Trophy-winning New York Rangers in the first round. On July 8, 2024, the Capitals announced that Chris Patrick would be promoted to general manager, with MacLellan retaining his position as president of hockey operations.

During the 2024–25 season, Ovechkin broke Wayne Gretzky's regular season goal record of 894, with his 895th career goal in a 4–1 loss to the New York Islanders on April 6, 2025. The Capitals also clinched their sixth Metropolitan Division title and the first seed in the Eastern Conference. In the playoffs, they were triumphant over the Montreal Canadiens before being defeated by the Hurricanes in the second round. Following the season, Nicklas Bäckström left the team to rejoin Brynäs IF of the Swedish Hockey League.

== Team information ==
=== Logos and jerseys ===
Original logo used by the Capitals (1974–1995)

The Capitals took to the ice in red, white, and blue jerseys featuring contrast-colored shoulders and stars on the chest and sleeves based on the flag of the United States. The original logo crest underwent a few modifications throughout the jersey's history.

Prior to the start of the 1995–96 season, the team abandoned its traditional red, white, and blue color scheme in favor of a blue, black, and copper palette with an American bald eagle with five stars as its logo. The alternate logo depicted the Capitol building with crossed hockey sticks behind. For the 1997–98 season, the team unveiled a black alternate jersey, devoid of blue with copper stripes on the ends of sleeves and at the waist. The crest on the white and blue jerseys were the bald eagle logo, while the crest on the black jersey was the Capitol logo. Initially, the team name was placed along the bottom black stripe, but was removed on the white jersey in 1997, while it remained on the blue jersey until its retirement. Prior to the 2000–01 season, the team retired its blue road jersey in favor of the black alternate jersey, but still kept the white jersey for home games.

Second and third black, blue, and copper logos used by the Capitals. The logo on the left was used from 1995 to 2002, while the logo on the right was used from 2002 to 2007.

The Capitals unveiled new uniforms on June 22, 2007, which coincided with the 2007 NHL entry draft and the new league-wide adaptation of the Reebok-designed uniform system for 2007–08. The change marked a return to the red, white, and blue color scheme originally used from 1974 to 1995. The new primary logo is reminiscent of the original Capitals' logo, complete with a hockey stick formed by the letter "t"; it also includes a new feature not present in the original logo in the form of three stars representing DC, Maryland, and Virginia. The stars are a reference to the flag of Washington, D.C., which is in turn based on the shield of George Washington's family coat of arms. The new alternate logo used an eagle in the shape of a "W" with the silhouette of the Washington Monument and the United States Capitol building in the negative space within and below.

For the 2011 Winter Classic, the Capitals wore a white jersey honoring the franchise's past with the original logo. The jersey resembled the one the franchise wore from 1974 to 1995. Instead of wearing the combination of blue pants and white helmets the team used when it played at the Capital Centre, the Capitals chose red pants and helmets for the New Year's Day game. The Capitals wore the same jersey, minus the NHL Winter Classic patch, on February 1, 2011, to honor Hockey Hall of Fame winger Dino Ciccarelli.

The current alternate logo used by the Capitals, introduced in 2007. Given the nickname "Weagle" by fans

The Capitals announced on September 16, 2011, that they would wear a third jersey modeled after the Winter Classic jersey for 16 road games during the 2011–12 season. For the 2015 Winter Classic, which took place on New Year's Day at Nationals Park in Washington, D.C., the Capitals wore a newly designed jersey intended to pay homage to hockey's outdoor roots. The primary color of the jersey was a vintage deep red. The addition of stripes on the shoulders, waist and legs brought in elements of Washington's professional hockey jerseys from the 1930s, predating the Capitals franchise's formation in the 1970s. A large "W" on the front of the jersey, topped with the common three stars, offset in blue to contrast the white "Capitals" wordmark.

Starting with the 2015–16 season, the Capitals wore their throwback red third jerseys, replacing the white Winter Classic thirds.

Prior to the 2017–18 season, the NHL announced a new partnership with Adidas, and the Capitals unveiled new uniforms with minor changes. There were no third jerseys during that season, but the return of the program in the 2018–19 season saw the return of the Capitals' red throwback uniforms as their alternates.

For the 2018 Stadium Series, the Capitals used newly designed navy uniforms, honoring the fact that the game was held at the U.S. Naval Academy. The chest logo was based on the regular stylized "Capitals" logo, but shortened to "Caps", the nickname commonly used for the team. There were also features honoring various aspects of D.C., as well as the presence of a slightly altered W logo from the 2015 Winter Classic on the pants.

In 2021, as part of Adidas' "Reverse Retro" uniform series, the Capital unveiled a recolored version of their blue "screaming eagle" uniform used from 1995 to 2000. The base color is red with dark blue accents. The Capitals also replaced their throwback red alternates with a dark blue third jersey; this design featured three red stars and a uniquely-designed white "W" with the Washington Monument triangle in the middle. The uniform also features white/red/white stripes on the waist and sleeves and a white shoulder yoke.

In 2022, a second "Reverse Retro" uniform was released, this time featuring a black version of the "screaming eagle" uniform with blue and copper accents. This uniform was restored as the team's alternate ahead of the 2024–25 season, updated to the Fanatics template.

For the 2023 Stadium Series, the Capitals unveiled a white uniform centered around the alternate "Weagle" logo, with its navy wings extending towards the sleeves with white numbers.

Prior to the 2025–26 season, the Capitals redesigned the "screaming eagle" alternate, now recolored to a red base with dark blue and silver accents. The white shoulder yoke and dark blue and white stripes were a visual nod to the original red uniforms.

During the 2026–27 season, the Capitals wore a "Hometown Remix" uniform, reusing the Capitol Dome crest from their 1997–2006 black uniform but on a blue-based uniform with bronze, white, and black stripes.

=== Practice facility ===
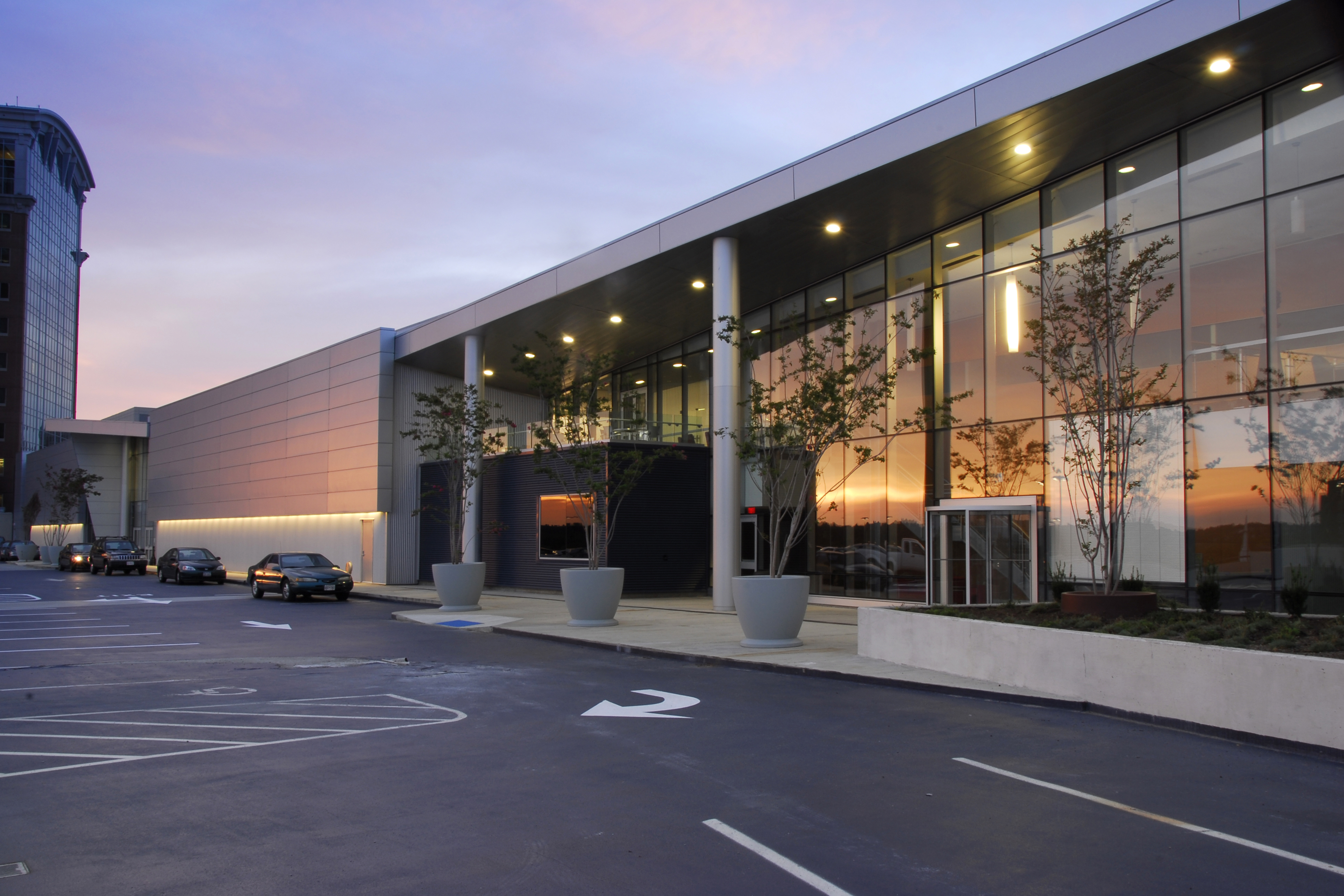
The Capitals practice at the MedStar Capitals Iceplex in Ballston, Virginia.

Since 2006, the Capitals have practiced in the Ballston neighborhood of Arlington County, Virginia. The practice facility is known as the MedStar Capitals Iceplex.

=== Mascot ===
Since 1995, the Capitals' mascot has been Slapshot, a bald eagle that wears the number 00. He was named by a fifth grader who won the naming contest.

== Season-by-season record ==
This is a partial list of the last five seasons completed by the Capitals. For the full season-by-season history, see List of Washington Capitals seasons

Note: GP = Games played, W = Wins, L = Losses, OTL = Overtime Losses/SOL = Shootout Losses, Pts = Points, GF = Goals for, GA = Goals against

Season	GP	W	L	OTL	Pts	GF	GA	Finish	Playoffs
2021–22	82	44	26	12	100	275	245	4th, Metropolitan	Lost in first round, 2–4 (Panthers)
2022–23	82	35	37	10	80	255	265	6th, Metropolitan	Did not qualify
2023–24	82	40	31	11	91	220	257	4th, Metropolitan	Lost in first round, 0–4 (Rangers)
2024–25	82	51	22	9	111	288	232	1st, Metropolitan	Lost in second round, 1–4 (Hurricanes)
2025–26	82	43	30	9	95	263	244	4th, Metropolitan	Did not qualify

== Players and personnel ==
=== Current roster ===
Updated November 2, 2026

No.	Nat	Player	Pos	S/G	Age	Acquired	Birthplace
72	(Canada)	Anthony Beauvillier	LW	L	29	2025	Sorel-Tracy, Quebec
6	(Canada)	Jakob Chychrun	D	L	28	2024	Boca Raton, Florida
73	(Canada)	Vincent Desharnais	D	R	30	2026	Laval, Quebec
80	(Canada)	Pierre-Luc Dubois	C	L	28	2024	Sainte-Agathe-des-Monts, Quebec
42	(Slovakia)	Martin Fehérváry	D	L	27	2018	Bratislava, Slovakia
53	(United States)	Ethen Frank	C	R	28	2022	Papillion, Nebraska
44	(United States)	Cole Hutson	D	L	20	2024	St. Louis, Missouri
22	(Canada)	Boone Jenner	C	L	33	2026	London, Ontario
25	(Canada)	Jordan Kyrou	RW	R	28	2026	Toronto, Ontario
9	(United States)	Ryan Leonard	RW	R	21	2023	Northampton, Massachusetts
27	(Sweden)	Timothy Liljegren	D	R	27	2026	Kristianstad, Sweden
79	(United States)	Charlie Lindgren	G	R	32	2022	Lakeville, Minnesota
63	(Russia)	Ivan Miroshnichenko	LW	R	22	2022	Ussuriysk, Russia
8	(Russia)	Alexander Ovechkin (C)	LW	R	41	2004	Moscow, Soviet Union
1	(Canada)	Rémi Poirier	G	L	25	2026	Farnham, Quebec
21	(Belarus)	Aliaksei Protas	C	L	25	2019	Vitebsk, Belarus
62	(Belarus)	Ilya Protas	LW	L	20	2024	Vitebsk, Belarus
3	(United States)	Matt Roy (A)	D	R	31	2024	Canton, Michigan
38	(Sweden)	Rasmus Sandin	D	L	26	2023	Uppsala, Sweden
34	(Canada)	Justin Sourdif	RW	R	24	2025	Richmond, British Columbia
29	(United States)	Jack St. Ivany	D	R	27	2026	Manhattan Beach, California
17	(Canada)	Dylan Strome (A)	C	L	29	2022	Mississauga, Ontario
48	(Canada)	Logan Thompson	G	R	29	2024	Calgary, Alberta
89	(United States)	Alex Tuch	RW	R	30	2026	Syracuse, New York
43	(Canada)	Tom Wilson (A)	RW	R	32	2012	Toronto, Ontario

=== Honored members ===
==== Hall of Fame honorees ====
The Washington Capitals hold an affiliation with a number of inductees to the Hockey Hall of Fame, including nine inductees from the players category and one from the builders category, five of whom played at least five seasons with the club (Gartner, Oates, Stevens, Langway, and Murphy).

In addition to players, members of the local sports media have been honored by the Hockey Hall of Fame. In 2007, Dave Fay, a sports journalist for The Washington Times, was a recipient of the Elmer Ferguson Memorial Award. In 2010, play-by-play radio broadcaster Ron Weber was awarded the Foster Hewitt Memorial Award from the Hall of Fame for his contributions to hockey broadcasting.

Players

- Zdeno Chára
- Dino Ciccarelli
- Sergei Fedorov
- Mike Gartner
- Phil Housley
- Rod Langway
- Larry Murphy
- Adam Oates
- Scott Stevens

Builders

- David Poile

==== Retired numbers ====
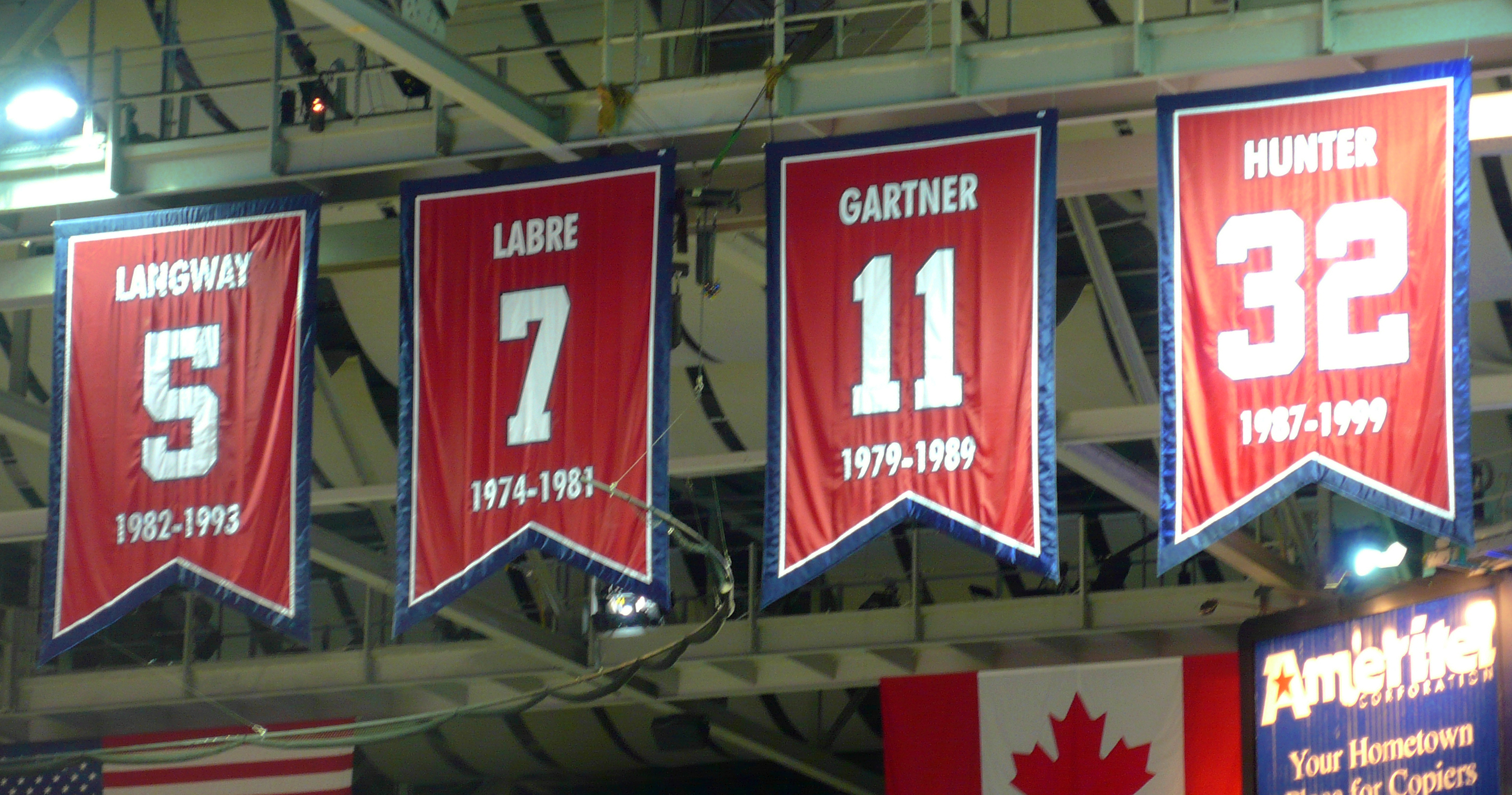
The Capitals honor the retired numbers of Rod Langway, Yvon Labre, Mike Gartner, and Dale Hunter with banners in Capital One Arena.

The Capitals have retired four numbers: 5, 7, 11, and 32. The NHL retired Wayne Gretzky's No. 99 for all its member teams at the 2000 NHL All-Star Game.

Washington Capitals retired numbers
No.	Player	Position	Career	No. retirement
5	Rod Langway	D	1982–1993	November 26, 1997
7	Yvon Labre	D	1974–1980	November 7, 1981
11	Mike Gartner	RW	1979–1989	December 28, 2008
32	Dale Hunter	C	1987–1999	March 11, 2000

=== Team captains ===
- Doug Mohns, 1974–1975
- Bill Clement, 1975–1976
- Yvon Labre, 1976–1978
- Guy Charron, 1978–1979
- Ryan Walter, 1979–1982
- Rod Langway, 1982–1992
- Kevin Hatcher, 1992–1994
- Dale Hunter, 1994–1999
- Adam Oates, 1999–2001
- Steve Konowalchuk and Brendan Witt, 2001–2002 (co-captains)
- Steve Konowalchuk, 2002–2003
- Jeff Halpern, 2005–2006
- Chris Clark, 2006–2009
- Alexander Ovechkin, 2010–present

=== General managers ===
- Milt Schmidt, 1973–1975
- Max McNab, 1975–1981
- Roger Crozier (interim), 1981–1982
- David Poile, 1982–1997
- George McPhee, 1997–2014
- Brian MacLellan, 2014–2024
- Chris Patrick, 2024–present

=== Head coaches ===
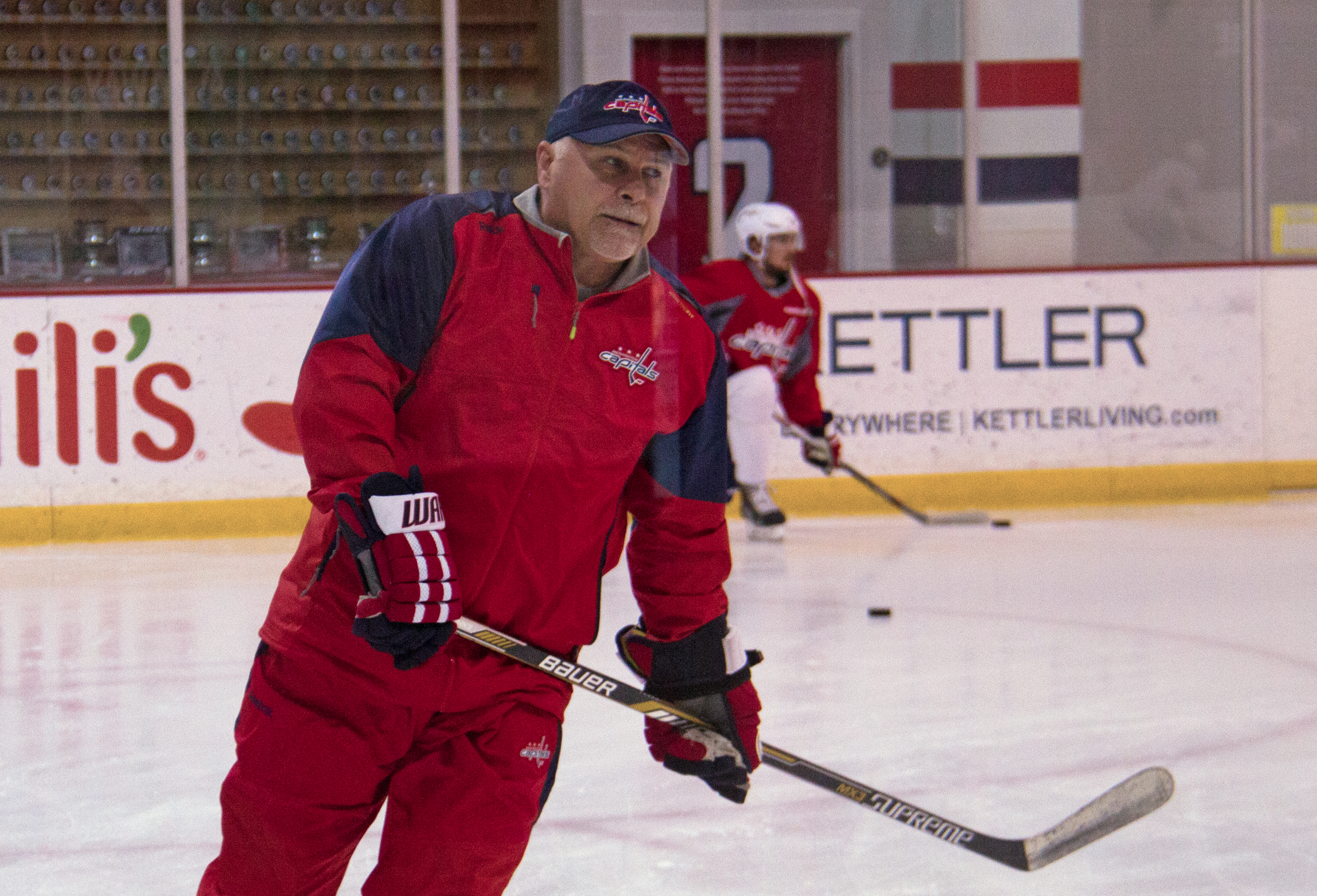
Barry Trotz guided the Capitals to their first Stanley Cup championship in 2018.

- Jim Anderson, 1974–1975
- Red Sullivan, 1975
- Milt Schmidt, 1975
- Tom McVie, 1975–1978
- Danny Belisle, 1978–1979
- Gary Green, 1979–1981
- Roger Crozier, 1981
- Bryan Murray, 1981–1990
- Terry Murray, 1990–1994
- Jim Schoenfeld, 1994–1997
- Ron Wilson, 1997–2002
- Bruce Cassidy, 2002–2003
- Glen Hanlon, 2003–2007
- Bruce Boudreau, 2007–2011
- Dale Hunter, 2011–2012
- Adam Oates, 2012–2014
- Barry Trotz, 2014–2018
- Todd Reirden, 2018–2020
- Peter Laviolette, 2020–2023
- Spencer Carbery, 2023–present

=== First-round draft picks ===
- 1974: Greg Joly (1st overall)
- 1975: Alex Forsyth (18th overall)
- 1976: Rick Green (1st overall), Greg Carroll (15th overall)
- 1977: Robert Picard (3rd overall)
- 1978: Ryan Walter (2nd overall), Tim Coulis (18th overall)
- 1979: Mike Gartner (4th overall)
- 1980: Darren Veitch (5th overall)
- 1981: Bob Carpenter (3rd overall)
- 1982: Scott Stevens (5th overall)
- 1984: Kevin Hatcher (17th overall)
- 1985: Yvon Corriveau (19th overall)
- 1986: Jeff Greenlaw (19th overall)
- 1988: Reggie Savage (15th overall)
- 1989: Olaf Kölzig (19th overall)
- 1990: John Slaney (9th overall)
- 1991: Pat Peake (14th overall), Trevor Halverson (21st overall)
- 1992: Sergei Gonchar (14th overall)
- 1993: Brendan Witt (11th overall), Jason Allison (17th overall)
- 1994: Nolan Baumgartner (10th overall), Alexander Kharlamov (15th overall)
- 1995: Brad Church (17th overall), Miika Elomo (23rd overall)
- 1996: Alexandre Volchkov (4th overall), Jaroslav Svejkovský (17th overall)
- 1997: Nick Boynton (9th overall)
- 1999: Kris Beech (7th overall)
- 2000: Brian Sutherby (26th overall)
- 2002: Steve Eminger (12th overall), Alexander Semin (13th overall), Boyd Gordon (17th overall)
- 2003: Eric Fehr (18th overall)
- 2004: Alexander Ovechkin (1st overall), Jeff Schultz (27th overall), Mike Green (29th overall)
- 2005: Sasha Pokulok (14th overall), Joe Finley (27th overall)
- 2006: Nicklas Bäckström (4th overall), Semyon Varlamov (23rd overall)
- 2007: Karl Alzner (5th overall)
- 2008: Anton Gustafsson (21st overall), John Carlson (27th overall)
- 2009: Marcus Johansson (24th overall)
- 2010: Evgeny Kuznetsov (26th overall)
- 2012: Filip Forsberg (11th overall), Tom Wilson (16th overall)
- 2013: André Burakovsky (23rd overall)
- 2014: Jakub Vrána (13th overall)
- 2015: Ilya Samsonov (22nd overall)
- 2016: Lucas Johansen (28th overall)
- 2018: Alexander Alexeyev (31st overall)
- 2019: Connor McMichael (25th overall)
- 2020: Hendrix Lapierre (22nd overall)
- 2022: Ivan Miroshnichenko (20th overall)
- 2023: Ryan Leonard (8th overall)
- 2024: Terik Parascak (17th overall)
- 2025: Lynden Lakovic (27th overall)
- 2026: Oliver Suvanto (18th overall)

== League and team honors ==
=== Awards and trophies ===
Stanley Cup

- 2017–18

Presidents' Trophy

- 2009–10, 2015–16, 2016–17

Prince of Wales Trophy

- 1997–98, 2017–18

Conn Smythe Trophy

- Alexander Ovechkin: 2017–18

Hart Memorial Trophy

- Alexander Ovechkin: 2007–08, 2008–09, 2012–13

Lester B. Pearson/Ted Lindsay Award

- Alexander Ovechkin: 2007–08, 2008–09, 2009–10

Art Ross Trophy

- Alexander Ovechkin: 2007–08

Maurice "Rocket" Richard Trophy

- Alexander Ovechkin: 2007–08, 2008–09, 2012–13, 2013–14, 2014–15, 2015–16, 2017–18, 2018–19, 2019–20

Calder Memorial Trophy

- Alexander Ovechkin: 2005–06

Frank J. Selke Trophy

- Doug Jarvis: 1983–84

James Norris Memorial Trophy

- Rod Langway: 1982–83, 1983–84

King Clancy Memorial Trophy

- Olaf Kölzig: 2005–06

Vezina Trophy

- Jim Carey: 1995–96
- Olaf Kölzig: 1999–00
- Braden Holtby: 2015–16

William M. Jennings Trophy

- Al Jensen and Pat Riggin: 1983–84
- Braden Holtby: 2016–17

Bill Masterton Memorial Trophy

- José Théodore: 2009–10

Jack Adams Award

- Bryan Murray: 1983–84
- Bruce Boudreau: 2007–08
- Barry Trotz: 2015–16
- Spencer Carbery: 2024–25

All-Rookie Team

- Scott Stevens: 1982–83
- Jim Carey: 1994–95
- Alexander Ovechkin: 2005–06
- Nicklas Bäckström: 2007–08
- John Carlson: 2010–11

=== NHL All-Star teams ===
First Team All-Star

- Rod Langway: 1982–83, 1983–84
- Scott Stevens: 1987–88
- Jim Carey: 1995–96
- Olaf Kölzig: 1999–2000
- Alexander Ovechkin: 2005–06, 2006–07, 2007–08, 2008–09, 2009–10, 2012–13, (Note: Ovechkin was selected a First Team All-Star at right wing and a Second Team All-Star at left wing for the 2012–13 season.) 2014–15, 2018–19
- Mike Green: 2008–09, 2009–10
- Braden Holtby: 2015–16
- John Carlson: 2019–20

Second Team All-Star

- Pat Riggin: 1983–84
- Rod Langway: 1984–85
- Larry Murphy: 1986–87
- Al Iafrate: 1992–93
- Sergei Gonchar: 2001–02, 2002–03
- Alexander Ovechkin: 2010–11, 2012–13, 2013–14, 2015–16
- Braden Holtby: 2016–17
- John Carlson: 2018–19
- Logan Thompson: 2025–26

== Franchise leaders ==
=== Scoring leaders ===
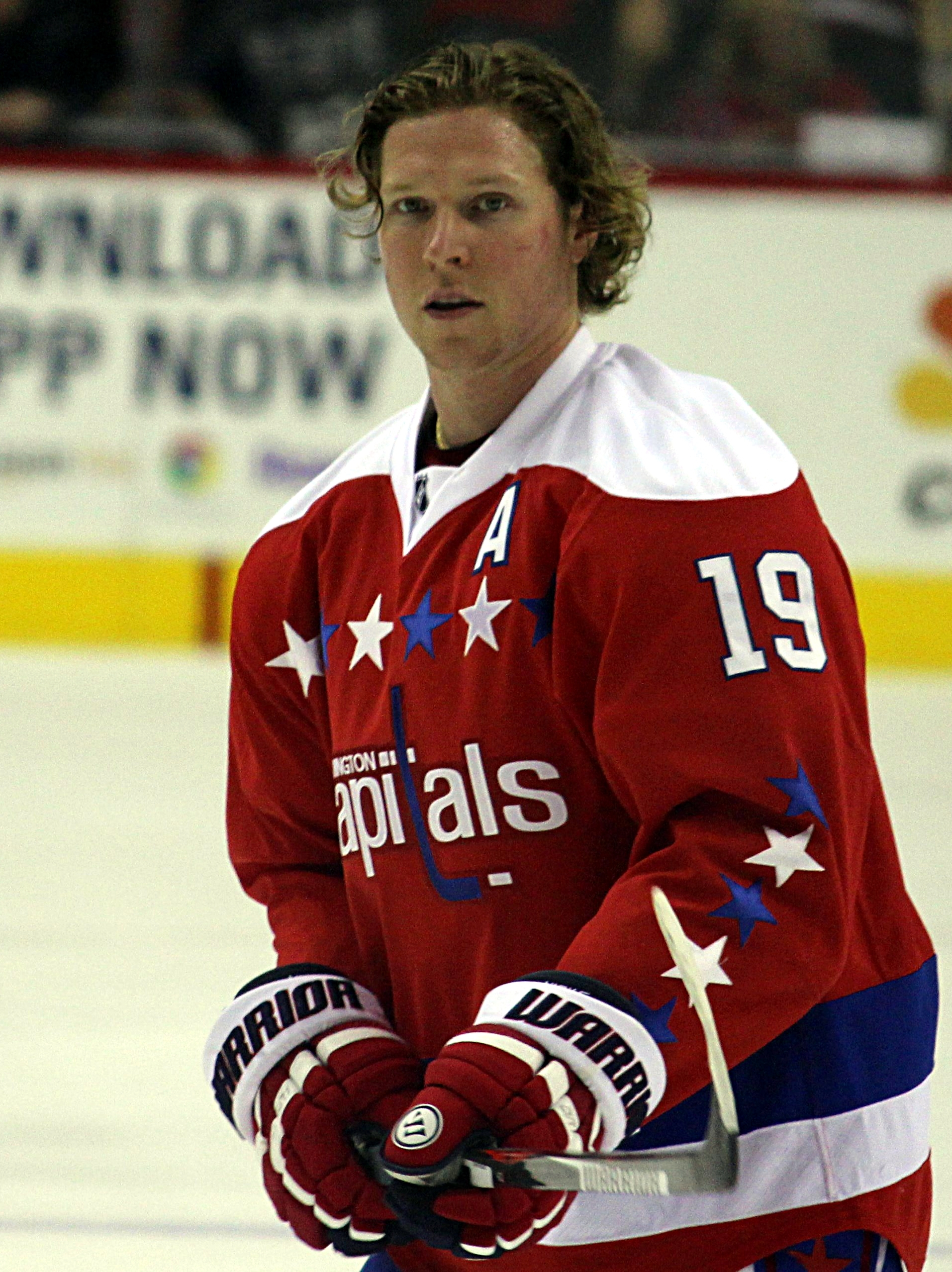
Nicklas Backstrom is the franchise's all-time assist leader for the regular season. During his Capitals career from 2006 to 2023, he recorded 762 assists in 1,105 games.

These are the top-ten point-scorers in franchise history. Figures are updated after each completed NHL regular season.

- * – current Capitals player

Note: Pos = Position; GP = Games Played; G = Goals; A = Assists; Pts = Points; P/G = Points per game

Points
Player	Pos	GP	G	A	Pts	P/G
Alexander Ovechkin*	LW	1,573	929	758	1,687	1.07
Nicklas Bäckström	C	1,105	271	762	1,033	.93
Peter Bondra	RW	961	472	353	825	.86
Mike Gartner	RW	758	397	392	789	1.04
John Carlson	D	1,143	166	605	771	.67
Michal Pivoňka	C	825	181	418	599	.73
Evgeny Kuznetsov	C	723	171	397	568	.79
Dale Hunter	C	872	181	375	556	.64
Bengt-Åke Gustafsson	LW	629	195	359	554	.88
Mike Ridley	C	588	218	329	547	.93

Goals
Player	Pos	G
Alexander Ovechkin*	LW	929
Peter Bondra	RW	472
Mike Gartner	RW	397
Nicklas Bäckström	C	271
Mike Ridley	C	218
Tom Wilson*	LW	209
Alexander Semin	RW	197
Bengt-Åke Gustafsson	LW	195
Dave Christian	RW	193
T. J. Oshie	RW	192

Assists
Player	Pos	A
Nicklas Bäckström	C	762
Alexander Ovechkin*	LW	758
John Carlson	D	605
Michal Pivoňka	C	418
Evgeny Kuznetsov	C	397
Mike Gartner	RW	392
Dale Hunter	C	375
Calle Johansson	D	361
Bengt-Åke Gustafsson	LW	359
Peter Bondra	RW	353

=== Goaltending leaders ===
These are the top-ten goaltenders in franchise history by wins. Figures are updated after each completed NHL regular season.

- * – current Capitals player

Note: GP = Games played; W = Wins; L = Losses; T/O = Ties/Overtime losses; GA = Goal against; GAA = Goals against average; SA = Shots against; SV% = Save percentage; SO = Shutouts

Goaltenders
Player	GP	W	L	T/O	GA	GAA	SA	SV%	SO
Olaf Kölzig	711	301	293	86	1,860	2.70	19,873	.906	35
Braden Holtby	468	282	122	46	1,133	2.53	13,486	.916	35
Don Beaupré	269	128	96	27	773	3.05	6,809	.886	12
Al Jensen	173	94	48	18	523	3.27	4,472	.883	8
Jim Carey	139	70	48	15	315	2.37	3,269	.904	14
Pete Peeters	139	70	41	15	396	3.06	3,488	.886	7
Charlie Lindgren*	141	67	49	16	390	2.90	3,871	.900	8
Pat Riggin	143	67	46	19	414	3.03	3,539	.883	6
José Théodore	104	62	24	12	278	2.84	2,924	.905	3
Logan Thompson*	101	62	27	12	245	2.46	2,759	.911	6

== Broadcasters ==
Monumental Sports Network (MSN) has carried Capitals games locally since its founding as Home Team Sports (HTS) in 1984. The channel was later rebranded into Comcast SportsNet Mid-Atlantic (CSN) from 2001 through 2017, and then NBC Sports Washington from 2017 to 2023. MSN's commentators are Joe Beninati, Craig Laughlin, "Inside-the-Glass" reporter Alan May, and rinkside reporter Al Koken.

The Capitals' flagship radio station is WJFK-FM (106.7 FM); commentators are John Walton and Ken Sabourin. The team's radio network consists of stations in Washington, Virginia, Maryland, West Virginia, Pennsylvania, and North Carolina.

Mike Vogel has been covering the team online for the Washington Capitals on its website since the 1995–96 season, writing daily game stories and analysis. Vogel, who also participates in podcasts and in-stadium video presentations as well as guesting on various Washington DC radio and television programs, has been described as "the most interesting man in Caps media".

== See also ==
- Capitals–Flyers rivalry
- Capitals–Islanders rivalry
- Capitals–Penguins rivalry
- Sports in Washington, D.C.

== Notes ==
Preceded by Pittsburgh Penguins	Stanley Cup champions 2017–18	Succeeded by St. Louis Blues
