= John Walton (sports broadcaster) =

American sportscaster

- Born: 1973 (age 52–53); Columbus, Ohio

John Walton is a sportscaster who is the radio play-by-play voice of the Washington Capitals. He also did national play-by-play work for NBC Sports before the rights were changed, and calls Stanley Cup playoff games.

== Career ==
Walton's first experience as a broadcaster was calling Miami University (OH) hockey games while a student. After college he worked as the public address announcer for the MLB's Cincinnati Reds from 1996 to 2002 and as the play-by-play announcer for the AHL's Cincinnati Mighty Ducks for three seasons. In 2002, he became the play-by-play voice of the Hershey Bears; he would later become the team's communications director, during which the team won three Calder Cup titles (2006, 2009, 2010). In 2011, Walton became an NHL broadcaster, getting hired by Hershey's parent club, the Washington Capitals, as their radio play-by-play voice.

== Olympics ==
Walton was a part of NBC's 2018 Winter Olympics coverage, calling women's ice hockey.
