= Yvon Labre =

Canadian ice hockey player

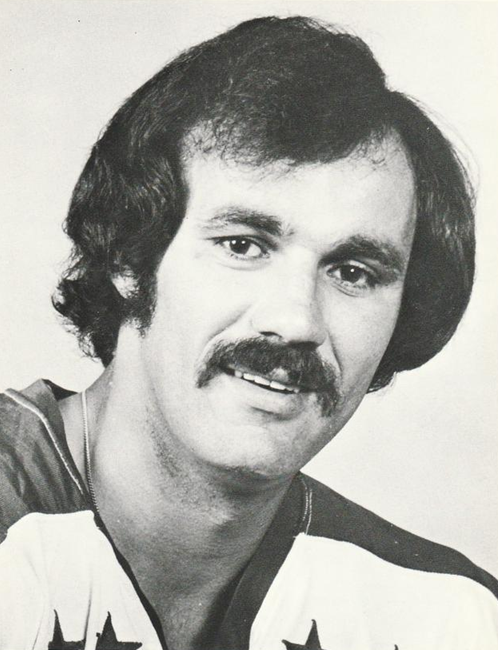
- Labre with the Washington Capitals in 1977
- Born: November 29, 1949 (age 76) Sudbury, Ontario, Canada
- Height: 5 ft 11 in (180 cm)
- Weight: 190 lb (86 kg; 13 st 8 lb)
- Position: Defence
- Shot: Left
- Played for: Pittsburgh Penguins; Washington Capitals
- NHL draft: 38th overall, 1969; Pittsburgh Penguins
- Playing career: 1969–1981

Yvon Jules Labre (born November 29, 1949) is a Canadian former professional ice hockey player.

== Early life ==
Labre was born in Sudbury, Ontario.

== Pro career ==
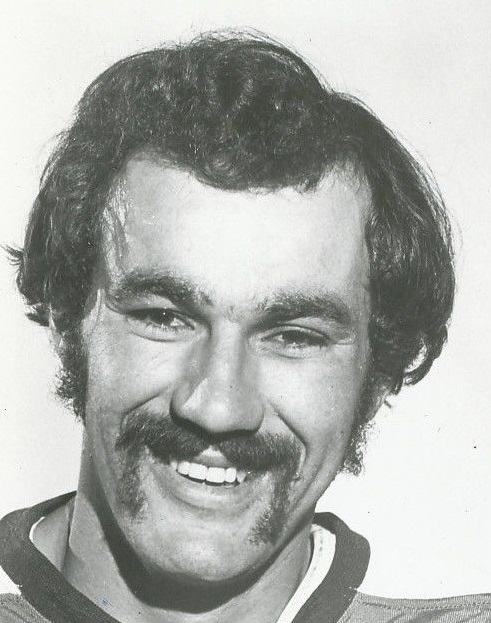
Labre with the Hershey Bears in 1973

He was originally drafted by the Pittsburgh Penguins, for whom he played 37 games before being selected by the Washington Capitals in the 1974 NHL Expansion Draft. Labre scored the first-ever home goal for Washington, beating the Los Angeles Kings' goaltender Rogie Vachon. Although he was never one to put up big offensive numbers, Labre's value was noted in being a hard-nosed defensive defenceman on the ice and an active member of community programs and youth hockey programs off it. Such dedication to a team in a location not known for rich hockey history made him one of the Capitals' most popular players during his time there.

Labre served as team captain from 1976 to 1978. He remained in the Capitals organization after his playing career ended. At various times since his retirement, he has served as an assistant coach, colour commentator, scout and the director of community relations for the Capitals. Labre's jersey number (#7) was retired by the Capitals on November 22, 1981, and he is the only player in franchise history to wear the number.

== Career statistics ==
			Regular Season					Playoffs
Season	Team	League	GP	G	A	Pts	PIM	GP	G	A	Pts	PIM
1966–67	Markham Waxers	MetJHL	32	0	14	14	—	—	—	—	—	—
1967–68	Toronto Marlboros	OHA-Jr.	43	4	8	12	107	5	0	0	0	18
1968–69	Toronto Marlboros	OHA-Jr.	54	1	16	17	185	6	1	1	2	26
1969–70	Baltimore Clippers	AHL	64	1	8	9	111	5	0	2	2	38
1970–71	Pittsburgh Penguins	NHL	21	1	1	2	19	—	—	—	—	—
1970–71	Amarillo Wranglers	CHL	42	2	9	11	125	—	—	—	—	—
1971–72	Hershey Bears	AHL	59	3	9	12	134	4	2	1	3	20
1972–73	Hershey Bears	AHL	72	8	29	37	170	7	1	3	4	35
1973–74	Hershey Bears	AHL	56	6	23	29	135	14	1	5	6	42
1973–74	Pittsburgh Penguins	NHL	16	1	2	3	13	—	—	—	—	—
1974–75	Washington Capitals	NHL	76	4	23	27	182	—	—	—	—	—
1975–76	Washington Capitals	NHL	80	2	20	22	146	—	—	—	—	—
1976–77	Washington Capitals	NHL	62	3	11	14	169	—	—	—	—	—
1977–78	Hershey Bears	AHL	21	1	6	7	72	—	—	—	—	—
1977–78	Washington Capitals	NHL	22	0	8	8	41	—	—	—	—	—
1978–79	Washington Capitals	NHL	51	1	13	14	80	—	—	—	—	—
1979–80	Washington Capitals	NHL	18	0	5	5	38	—	—	—	—	—
1980–81	Washington Capitals	NHL	25	2	4	6	100	—	—	—	—	—
AHL totals			272	19	75	94	622	30	4	11	15	135
NHL totals			371	14	87	101	788	—	—	—	—	—

Preceded by Bill Clement	Washington Capitals captain 1976–78	Succeeded by Guy Charron
