= Ron Weber =

Sports radio announcer (born 1933)

- Born: September 10, 1933 (age 92); Lock Haven, Pennsylvania, U.S.
- Occupation: former radio broadcaster for the Washington Capitals

Ronald F. Weber (born September 10, 1933) is an American former radio play-by-play announcer for the NHL's Washington Capitals for 23 years. He is best known for his streak of calling the Capitals' first 1,936 games, starting in 1974 with their inaugural game and ending with his retirement after the 1996–97 season. He was the 2010 recipient of the Foster Hewitt Memorial Award, given for outstanding contributions to hockey broadcasting, which earned him a place on the wall at the Hockey Hall of Fame in Toronto.

== Career ==
Ron Weber grew up in Arlington, Virginia and attended Washington-Lee High School. Weber's first job in broadcasting was at WBOC-TV/Radio in Salisbury, Md., where he was Sports Director in addition to performing other on-air duties for over eight years starting in the late 1950s. Weber started his hockey broadcasting career with the Baltimore Clippers, and, in addition to his time with the Capitals, has done play-by-play for many other teams in various leagues, including the NBA's Philadelphia 76ers, the MLB's Minnesota Twins, the now-defunct North American Soccer League's Washington Diplomats, and the NCAA's Penn Quakers football, as well as professional tennis and weightlifting matches. He broadcast the 1968 Olympic games.

Weber still follows the Capitals very closely; he attends 35 home games per season. The Capitals brought him back to the booth for the first period of Game 4 of the 2018 Stanley Cup Final.

== Personal ==
He currently lives in Needham, Massachusetts. His beloved wife Mary Jane departed on September 5, 2019. Ron has three children, 5 grandchildren, and 4 great-grandchildren.
