= Ken Sabourin =

Canadian ice hockey player (born 1966)

- Born: April 28, 1966 (age 60) Scarborough, Ontario, Canada
- Height: 6 ft 4 in (193 cm)
- Weight: 205 lb (93 kg; 14 st 9 lb)
- Position: Defence
- Shot: Left
- Played for: Calgary Flames; Washington Capitals
- NHL draft: 33rd overall, 1984; Calgary Flames
- Playing career: 1986–1999

Ken R. Sabourin (born April 28, 1966) is a Canadian former ice hockey player who played 74 games in the National Hockey League (NHL) for the Calgary Flames and Washington Capitals between 1989 and 1992. The rest of his career, which lasted from 1986 to 1999 was spent in the minor leagues. He won the Turner Cup, the championship trophy of the International Hockey League with the Salt Lake Golden Eagles in 1988. Since 2002, Sabourin has been a colour analyst on Washington Capitals radio broadcasts.

== Playing career ==
As a youth, Sabourin played in the 1979 Quebec International Pee-Wee Hockey Tournament with a minor ice hockey team from Don Mills.

Sabourin played four seasons of junior hockey in the Ontario Hockey League (OHL) between 1982 and 1986, primarily with the Sault Ste. Marie Greyhounds. He was a defensive specialist whose best season offensively was 1983–84 with seven goals. Sabourin was a member of the Greyhounds team that won the J. Ross Robertson Cup in 1984–85 as OHL champions. The Greyhounds defeated the Peterborough Petes in the final, then reached the semi-final of the 1985 Memorial Cup. Sabourin completed his junior career in 1985–86 in a season split between the Greyhounds and the Cornwall Royals.

The Calgary Flames selected Sabourin with their second-round pick, 33rd overall, at the 1984 NHL entry draft. He made his professional debut following his final junior season when he suited up for three regular season games and six in the playoffs for Calgary's American Hockey League (AHL) affiliate, the Moncton Golden Flames in 1985–86. Sabourin played his first full season in 1986–87 when he appeared in 75 games for Moncton and shifted to the Salt Lake Golden Eagles of the International Hockey League (IHL) in 1987–88. He added one goal and six assists in 16 playoff games for the Golden Eagles as they won the Turner Cup as IHL champions.

Sabourin spent the majority of the 1988–89 season with Salt Lake, but made his NHL debut during the season with Calgary when he appeared in six regular season games and one playoff game for the Stanley Cup champion Flames. Enough to earn a Stanley Cup ring, but not enough games played to be included on the Stanley Cup. In 1989–90, Sabourin recorded a career high 24 points with the Golden Eagles, to go along with 336 penalty minutes, and appeared in five games with the Flames. He scored his first NHL goal on October 27, 1990, against the Washington Capitals. He was unable to gain a regular position in the Flames lineup, and was traded to Washington on January 24, 1991, in exchange for Paul Fenton. The Capitals acquired Sabourin primarily to add a physical presence to their defence.

Split between the two teams, Sabourin appeared in a career-high 44 NHL games in 1990–91 and scored two goals and nine points. He appeared in 19 games with Washington in 1991–92, which marked his last NHL appearances. He finished the season with Washington's AHL affiliate, the Baltimore Skipjacks. After thirty games with Baltimore in 1992–93, Washington traded Sabourin, along with Paul MacDermid, to the Quebec Nordiques in exchange for Mike Hough on January 20, 1993. He finished the season with Salt Lake in the IHL. Sabourin then spent five seasons with the Milwaukee Admirals before finishing his playing career following the 1998–99 IHL season after one year with the Orlando Solar Bears.

Sabourin returned to the Capitals in 2002 as a colour analyst on the team's radio broadcasts, a role he continues to hold in the 2023-24 NHL season.

== Career statistics ==
=== Regular season and playoffs ===
			Regular season					Playoffs
Season	Team	League	GP	G	A	Pts	PIM	GP	G	A	Pts	PIM
1982–83	Sault Ste. Marie Greyhounds	OHL	58	0	8	8	90	10	0	0	0	14
1983–84	Sault Ste. Marie Greyhounds	OHL	63	7	14	21	157	9	0	1	1	25
1984–85	Sault Ste. Marie Greyhounds	OHL	63	5	19	24	139	16	1	4	5	10
1984–85	Sault Ste. Marie Greyhounds	M-Cup	—	—	—	—	—	4	0	2	2	2
1985–86	Sault Ste. Marie Greyhounds	OHL	25	1	5	6	77	—	—	—	—	—
1985–86	Cornwall Royals	OHL	37	3	12	15	94	6	1	2	3	6
1985–86	Moncton Golden Flames	AHL	3	0	0	0	0	6	0	1	1	2
1986–87	Moncton Golden Flames	AHL	75	1	10	11	166	6	0	1	1	27
1987–88	Salt Lake Golden Eagles	IHL	71	2	8	10	186	16	1	6	7	57
1988–89	Calgary Flames	NHL	6	0	1	1	26	1	0	0	0	0
1988–89	Salt Lake Golden Eagles	IHL	74	2	18	20	197	11	0	1	26
1989–90	Calgary Flames	NHL	5	0	0	0	10	—	—	—	—	—
1989–90	Salt Lake Golden Eagles	IHL	76	5	19	24	336	11	0	2	2	40
1990–91	Calgary Flames	NHL	16	1	3	4	36	—	—	—	—	—
1990–91	Washington Capitals	NHL	28	1	4	5	81	11	0	0	0	34
1990–91	Salt Lake Golden Eagles	IHL	28	2	15	17	77	—	—	—	—	—
1991–92	Washington Capitals	NHL	19	0	0	0	48	—	—	—	—	—
1991–92	Baltimore Skipjacks	AHL	30	3	8	11	106	—	—	—	—	—
1992–93	Baltimore Skipjacks	AHL	30	5	14	19	68	—	—	—	—	—
1992–93	Salt Lake Golden Eagles	IHL	52	2	11	13	140	—	—	—	—	—
1993–94	Milwaukee Admirals	IHL	81	6	13	19	279	15	1	1	2	69
1994–95	Milwaukee Admirals	IHL	75	3	16	19	297	15	1	1	2	69
1995–96	Milwaukee Admirals	IHL	82	2	8	10	252	5	0	1	1	24
1996–97	Milwaukee Admirals	IHL	81	2	9	11	233	3	0	0	0	2
1997–98	Milwaukee Admirals	IHL	71	1	5	6	172	10	0	1	1	55
1998–99	Orlando Solar Bears	IHL	72	3	4	7	248	14	0	0	0	49
IHL totals			763	30	126	156	2417	89	2	12	14	332
NHL totals			74	2	8	10	201	12	0	0	0	34
