= 1979–80 Toronto Maple Leafs season =

NHL hockey team season

1979–80 Toronto Maple Leafs
- Division: 4th Adams
- Conference: 5th Wales
- 1979–80 record: 35–40–5
- Home record: 17–19–4
- Road record: 18–21–1
- Goals for: 304
- Goals against: 327

Team information
- General manager: Punch Imlach
- Coach: Floyd Smith; Dick Duff; Punch Imlach
- Captain: Darryl Sittler (Oct-Dec) vacant (Dec-Apr)
- Alternate captains: None
- Arena: Maple Leaf Gardens

Team leaders
- Goals: Darryl Sittler (40)
- Assists: Darryl Sittler (57)
- Points: Darryl Sittler (97)
- Penalty minutes: Tiger Williams (197)
- Wins: Mike Palmateer (16)
- Goals against average: Jiri Crha (3.61)

The 1979–80 Toronto Maple Leafs season was the 63rd season of the franchise, 53rd season as the Maple Leafs. In July 1979, Leafs owner Harold Ballard brought back Punch Imlach, a longtime friend, as general manager. Imlach traded Lanny McDonald to undermine team captain Darryl Sittler's influence on the team. The McDonald trade sent the Leafs into a downward spiral. They finished five games under .500 and only made the playoffs for the seventh consecutive year due to the presence of the Quebec Nordiques, a refugee from the WHA, in the Adams Division.

== Offseason ==
=== NHL draft ===
Round	Pick	Player	Nationality	College/junior/club team
1	9	Laurie Boschman (C)	Canada	Brandon Wheat Kings (WHL)
3	51	Normand Aubin (C)	Canada	Verdun Eperviers (QMJHL)
4	72	Vincent Tremblay (G)	Canada	Quebec Remparts (QMJHL)
5	93	Frank Nigro (C)	Canada	London Knights (OMJHL)
6	114	Bill McCreary Jr. (RW)	United States	Colgate University (ECAC)

== Regular season ==
The 1979–80 season marked the dismantling of a promising hockey team. The Maple Leafs had stars such as Darryl Sittler, Mike Palmateer, Lanny McDonald, Tiger Williams, Borje Salming and Ian Turnbull. In previous years, the Leafs were always one of the top teams in the league but could not beat the Montreal Canadiens in the playoffs. Leafs' owner Harold Ballard fired General Manager Jim Gregory and Head Coach Roger Neilson. After unsuccessfully attempting to hire both former Boston Bruins head coach Don Cherry (who became head coach of the Colorado Rockies) and former Montreal Canadiens head coach Scotty Bowman (who became head coach and general manager of the Buffalo Sabres; ironically, he hired Neilson as an assistant coach), Ballard brought back Punch Imlach, who had been the Leafs' coach and general manager when they last won the Stanley Cup in 1967, to be the team's new GM. Imlach subsequently hired Floyd Smith, a former Leaf player who had previously coached for Imlach when he was GM of the Sabres, to be the Leafs' new head coach.

By November 1979, tensions between Imlach and Sittler mounted as Sittler publicly aired his grievances. An article was featured in the Globe and Mail by James Christie, titled Darryl Sittler drops the Gloves. Sittler was unhappy that Imlach publicly criticized him and Mike Palmateer. Another point of tension for Sittler was that Imlach placed Lanny McDonald and Ian Turnbull on waivers.

On December 13, 1979, Imlach announced that Carl Brewer was making another comeback in the NHL. Brewer would play for the New Brunswick Hawks, the Maple Leafs' American Hockey League affiliate. In Brewer's first game in Moncton, New Brunswick, King Clancy and Johnny Bower showed up to watch him play.

Brewer returned to the Maple Leafs on December 26, 1979, for the Maple Leafs game against the Washington Capitals. Many players on the Leafs felt that Brewer was a spy for Imlach. In Brewer's first game, many of his teammates were openly hostile to him. Brewer's defense partner was Börje Salming, and Salming refused to pass Brewer the puck. During the season, Brewer would only play in twenty contests.

=== Season standings ===
Adams Division
	GP	W	L	T	GF	GA	Pts
**Buffalo Sabres**	80	47	17	16	318	201	110
**Boston Bruins**	80	46	21	13	310	234	105
**Minnesota North Stars**	80	36	28	16	311	253	88
**Toronto Maple Leafs**	80	35	40	5	304	327	75
Quebec Nordiques	80	25	44	11	248	313	61

Note: GP = Games played, W = Wins, L = Losses, T = Ties, Pts = Points, GF = Goals for, GA = Goals against
Note: Teams that qualified for the playoffs are highlighted in bold.

League standings
R		Div	GP	W	L	T	GF	GA	Pts
1	**p – Philadelphia Flyers**	PTK	80	48	12	20	327	254	116
2	**y – Buffalo Sabres**	ADM	80	47	17	16	318	201	110
3	**x – Montreal Canadiens**	NRS	80	47	20	13	328	240	107
4	**Boston Bruins**	ADM	80	46	21	13	310	234	105
5	**New York Islanders**	PTK	80	39	28	13	281	247	91
6	**Minnesota North Stars**	ADM	80	36	28	16	311	253	88
7	**x – Chicago Black Hawks**	SMY	80	34	27	19	241	250	87
8	**New York Rangers**	PTK	80	38	32	10	308	284	86
9	**Atlanta Flames**	PTK	80	35	32	13	282	269	83
10	**St. Louis Blues**	SMY	80	34	34	12	266	278	80
11	**Toronto Maple Leafs**	ADM	80	35	40	5	304	327	75
12	**Los Angeles Kings**	NRS	80	30	36	14	290	313	74
13	**Pittsburgh Penguins**	NRS	80	30	37	13	251	303	73
14	**Hartford Whalers**	NRS	80	27	34	19	303	312	73
15	**Vancouver Canucks**	SMY	80	27	37	16	256	281	70
16	**Edmonton Oilers**	SMY	80	28	39	13	301	322	69
17	Washington Capitals	PTK	80	27	40	13	261	293	67
18	Detroit Red Wings	NRS	80	26	43	11	268	306	63
19	Quebec Nordiques	ADM	80	25	44	11	248	313	61
20	Winnipeg Jets	SMY	80	20	49	11	214	314	51
21	Colorado Rockies	SMY	80	19	48	13	234	308	51

Divisions: ADM – Adams, NRS – Norris, PTK – Patrick, SMY – Smythe

bold – The top 16 teams in the league qualified for the playoffs, regardless of division or conference.
x – Won division; y – Won Conference (and division); p – Won Presidents' Trophy (and conference and division)

=== Record vs. opponents ===
Adams Division record vs. opponents

==== Vs. Wales Conference ====
**Vs. Adams Division**

1979–80 NHL records
Team	**BOS**	**BUF**	**MIN**	**QUE**	**TOR**	**Total**
Boston	—	2–1–1	2–2	4–0	4–0	**12–3–1**
Buffalo	1–2–1	—	2–1–1	3–1	4–0	**10–4–2**
Minnesota	2–2	1–2–1	—	2–1–1	2–2	**7–7–2**
Quebec	0–4	1–3	1–2–1	—	3–1	**5–10–1**
Toronto	0–4	0–4	2–2	1–3	—	**3–13–0**

**Vs. Norris Division**

1979–80 NHL records
Team	**DET**	**HFD**	**LAK**	**MTL**	**PIT**	**Total**
Boston	2–1–1	2–1–1	2–1–1	1–3	2–2	**9–8–3**
Buffalo	3–1	3–1	3–0–1	1–1–2	4–0	**14–3–3**
Minnesota	1–2–1	4–0	0–2–2	1–3	3–1	**9–8–3**
Quebec	1–2–1	1–1–2	1–3	1–2–1	2–2	**6–10–4**
Toronto	4–0	2–2	0–3–1	1–3	2–2	**9–10–1**

==== Vs. Campbell Conference ====
**Vs. Patrick Division**

1979–80 NHL records
Team	**ATL**	**NYI**	**NYR**	**PHI**	**WSH**	**Total**
Boston	4–0	3–1	2–2	1–1–2	2–1–1	**12–5–3**
Buffalo	3–0–1	2–1–1	2–1–1	0–3–1	4–0	**11–5–4**
Minnesota	1–1–2	2–0–2	2–1–1	1–3	3–0–1	**9–5–6**
Quebec	0–3–1	0–4	1–2–1	0–3–1	1–1–2	**2–13–5**
Toronto	3–1	1–3	2–2	1–1–2	3–1	**10–8–2**

**Vs. Smythe Division**

1979–80 NHL records
Team	**CHI**	**COL**	**EDM**	**STL**	**VAN**	**WIN**	**Total**
Boston	2−2	2−1−1	4−0	1−1−2	1−0−3	3−1	**13−5−6**
Buffalo	1−1−2	3−1	2−1−1	2−2	1−0−3	3−0−1	**12−5−7**
Minnesota	1−2−1	3−1	1−1−2	3−1	1−2−1	2−1−1	**11−8−5**
Quebec	1−2−1	3−1	2−2	2−2	2−2	2−2	**12−11−1**
Toronto	0−4	3−0−1	1−2−1	2−2	3−1	4−0	**13−9−2**

== Schedule and results ==
1979–80 regular season
October

Game	Date	Opponent	Score	Location/Attendance	Record
1	10/10/1979	New York Rangers	3-6	Maple Leaf Gardens	0–1–0
2	10/13/1979	Colorado Rockies	2 – 1	Maple Leaf Gardens	1–1–0
3	10/14/1979	at Philadelphia Flyers	3 – 4	The Spectrum	1–2–0
4	10/17/1979	Minnesota North Stars	6 – 2	Maple Leaf Gardens	2–2–0
5	10/19/1979	at Washington Capitals	5 – 3	Maple Leaf Gardens	3–2–0
6	10/20/1979	Vancouver Canucks	2 – 0	Maple Leaf Gardens	4–2–0
7	10/24/1979	at Vancouver Canucks	1 – 5	The Pacific Coliseum	4–3–0
8	10/26/1979	at Colorado Rockies	2 – 2	McNichols Sports Arena	4–3–1
9	10/27/1979	at Los Angeles Kings	5 – 7	The Forum	4–4–1
10	10/31/1979	Hartford Whalers	2 – 4	Maple Leaf Gardens	4–5–1

November

Game	Date	Opponent	Score	Location/Attendance	Record
11	11/2/1979	at Hartford Whalers	3 – 5	Springfield Civic Center	4–6–1
12	11/3/1979	Buffalo Sabres	3 – 4	Maple Leaf Gardens	4–7–1
13	11/7/1979	at St. Louis Blues	7 – 4		5–7–1
14	11/10/1979	at Winnipeg Jets	8 – 4		6–7–1
15	11/11/1979	at Edmonton Oilers	6 – 3		7–7–1
16	11/14/1979	St. Louis Blues	7 – 2		8–7–1
17	11/17/1979	Boston Bruins	0 – 2	Maple Leaf Gardens	8–8–1
18	11/18/1979	at Quebec Nordiques	2 – 4	Le Colisée	8–9–1
19	11/21/1979	Edmonton Oilers	4 – 4	Maple Leaf Gardens	8–9–2
20	11/24/1979	Chicago Blackhawks	1 – 2	Maple Leaf Gardens	8–10–2
21	11/25/1979	at New York Rangers	4 – 3	Madison Square Garden	9–10–2
22	11/27/1979	at Atlanta Flames	5 – 3		10–10–2
23	11/28/1979	at Washington Capitals	4 – 2		11–10–2

December

Game	Date	Opponent	Score	Location/Attendance	Record
24	12/1/1979	Philadelphia Flyers	4-4	Maple Leaf Gardens	11–10–3
25	12/5/1979	Montreal Canadiens	3 – 2	Maple Leaf Gardens	12–10–3
26	12/7/1979	New York Islanders	1 – 6	Maple Leaf Gardens	12–11–3
27	12/12/1979	Colorado Rockies	5 – 3	Maple Leaf Gardens	13–11–3
28	12/15/1979	Atlanta Flames	8 – 1	Maple Leaf Gardens	14–11–3
29	12/17/1979	at Minnesota North Stars	1 – 5		14–12–3
30	12/19/1979	Los Angeles Kings	4 – 4	Maple Leaf Gardens	14–12–4
31	12/20/1979	at Boston Bruins	0 – 10	Boston Garden	14–13–4
32	12/22/1979	Detroit Red Wings	2 – 1	Maple Leaf Gardens	15–13–4
33	12/23/1979	at Montreal Canadiens	4 – 8	Montreal Forum	15–14–4
34	12/26/1979	Washington Capitals	2 – 8	Maple Leaf Gardens	15–15–4
35	12/27/1979	at Buffalo Sabres	3 – 5	War Memorial Auditorium	15–16–4
36	12/29/1979	Winnipeg Jets	6 – 1	Maple Leaf Gardens	16–16–4

January

Game	Date	Opponent	Score	Location/Attendance	Record
37	1/2/1980	New York Islanders	1-3	Maple Leaf Gardens	16–17–4
38	1/5/1980	Quebec Nordiques	3 – 7	Maple Leaf Gardens	16–18–4
39	1/7/1980	Pittsburgh Penguins	9 – 5	Maple Leaf Gardens	17–18–4
40	1/9/1980	Montreal Canadiens	3 – 5	Maple Leaf Gardens	17–19–4
41	1/12/1980	Vancouver Canucks	6 – 4	Maple Leaf Gardens	18–19–4
42	1/16/1980	at Pittsburgh Penguins	4 – 6		18–20–4
43	1/17/1980	at New York Islanders	6 – 9		18–21–4
44	1/19/1980	at Montreal Canadiens	2 – 7	Montreal Forum	18–22–4
45	1/22/1980	at Atlanta Flames	4 – 2		19–22–4
46	1/24/1980	at Los Angeles Kings	4 – 5	Los Angeles Forum	19–23–4
47	1/26/1980	at Edmonton Oilers	3 – 8	Northlands Coliseum	19–24–4
48	1/27/1980	at Vancouver Canucks	5 – 2		20–24–4
49	1/30/1980	Detroit Red Wings	6 – 4	Maple Leaf Gardens	21–24–4

February

Game	Date	Opponent	Score	Location/Attendance	Record
50	2/2/1980	Chicago Blackhawks	4-5	Maple Leaf Gardens	21–25–4
51	2/3/1980	at Chicago Blackhawks	2 – 4	Chicago Stadium	21–26–4
52	2/7/1980	at Boston Bruins	6 – 8	Boston Garden	21–27–4
53	2/9/1980	Los Angeles Kings	2 – 7	Maple Leaf Gardens	21–28–4
54	2/10/1980	at Detroit Red Wings	4 – 1		22–28–4
55	2/13/1980	Pittsburgh Penguins	2 – 4	Maple Leaf Gardens	22–29–4
56	2/16/1980	Hartford Whalers	5 – 3	Maple Leaf Gardens	23–29–4
57	2/17/1980	at New York Rangers	6 – 4	Madison Square Garden	24–29–4
58	2/19/1980	at New York Islanders	6 – 4		25–29–4
59	2/20/1980	at Chicago Blackhawks	2 – 4	Chicago Stadium	25–30–4
60	2/23/1980	at Winnipeg Jets	9 – 3		26–30–4
61	2/26/1980	at St. Louis Blues	2 – 5		26–31–4
62	2/27/1980	at Colorado Rockies	4 – 3		27–31–4

March

Game	Date	Opponent	Score	Location/Attendance	Record
63	3/1/1980	Philadelphia Flyers	3 – 3	Maple Leaf Gardens	27–31–5
64	3/2/1980	at Detroit Red Wings	6 – 3		28–31–5
65	3/5/1980	at Pittsburgh Penguins	5 – 3		29–31–5
66	3/8/1980	Quebec Nordiques	3 – 2		30–31–5
67	3/9/1980	at Quebec Nordiques	4 – 5	Le Colisée	30–32–5
68	3/12/1980	St. Louis Blues	2 – 3	Maple Leaf Gardens	30–33–5
69	3/15/1980	New York Rangers	4 – 8	Maple Leaf Gardens	30–34–5
70	3/17/1980	Atlanta Flames	1 – 5	Maple Leaf Gardens	30–35–5
71	3/19/1980	Winnipeg Jets	9 – 1	Maple Leaf Gardens	31–35–5
72	3/20/1980	at Philadelphia Flyers	3 – 0		32–35–5
73	3/22/1980	Buffalo Sabres	1 – 5	Maple Leaf Gardens	32–36–5
74	3/24/1980	Washington Capitals	6 – 1	Maple Leaf Gardens	33–36–5
75	3/25/1980	at Minnesota North Stars	2 – 7		33–37–5
76	3/29/1980	Edmonton Oilers	5 – 8	Maple Leaf Gardens	33–38–5

April

Game	Date	Opponent	Score	Location/Attendance	Record
77	4/1/1980	at Hartford Whalers	5-4		34–38–5
78	4/2/1980	Boston Bruins	2-5	Maple Leaf Gardens	34–39–5
79	4/5/1980	Minnesota North Stars	2-1	Maple Leaf Gardens	35–39–5
80	4/6/1980	at Buffalo Sabres	3-7	Buffalo War Memorial Auditorium	35–40–5

Legend: Win (2 points) Loss (0 points) Tie (1 point)

== Playoffs ==
1980 Stanley Cup playoffs
Preliminary round vs. (6) Minnesota North Stars – North Stars win 3–0

Game	Date	Opponent	Score	Series
1	April 8, 1980	at Minnesota North Stars	3 – 6	Stars lead series 1–0
2	April 9, 1980	at Minnesota North Stars	2 – 7	Stars lead series 2–0
3	April 11, 1980	Minnesota North Stars	3 – 4 (OT)	Stars win series 3–0

Legend: Win Loss

== Player statistics ==
=== Regular season ===
Scoring

Player	Pos	GP	G	A	Pts	PIM	+/-	PPG	SHG	GWG
Darryl Sittler	C	73	40	57	97	62	3	17	1	5
Borje Salming	D	74	19	52	71	94	4	4	0	1
John Anderson	RW	74	25	28	53	22	5	3	0	5
Wilf Paiement	RW	41	20	28	48	72	1	8	0	2
Laurie Boschman	C	80	16	32	48	78	2	2	0	4
Rocky Saganiuk	RW/C	75	24	23	47	52	-5	3	0	4
Walt McKechnie	C	54	7	36	43	4	-6	1	0	0
Tiger Williams	LW	55	22	18	40	197	-13	5	0	1
Ian Turnbull	D	75	11	28	39	90	-23	3	0	0
Pat Hickey	LW	45	22	16	38	16	1	6	0	3
Dan Maloney	LW	71	17	16	33	102	-13	1	0	1
Lanny McDonald	RW	35	15	15	30	10	-1	6	0	2
Paul Gardner	C	45	11	13	24	10	-8	4	0	1
Ron Ellis	RW	59	12	11	23	6	-9	0	1	2
Terry Martin	LW	37	6	15	21	2	6	1	0	2
Dave Burrows	D	80	3	16	19	42	0	0	0	0
Bill Derlago	C	23	5	12	17	13	-6	1	0	0
Rick Vaive	RW	22	9	7	16	77	-4	2	0	1
Jerry Butler	RW	55	7	8	15	29	-3	0	0	1
Greg Hotham	D	46	3	10	13	10	-4	0	0	0
Richard Mulhern	D	26	0	10	10	11	-1	0	0	0
Dave Farrish	D	20	1	8	9	30	5	0	0	0
Mike Kaszycki	C	25	4	4	8	10	-4	0	0	0
Dave Hutchison	D	31	1	6	7	28	1	0	0	0
Joel Quenneville	D	32	1	4	5	24	-2	1	0	0
Carl Brewer	D	20	0	5	5	2	-5	0	0	0
Bob Stephenson	RW	14	2	2	4	4	-7	0	0	0
Pat Boutette	C/RW	32	0	4	4	17	-6	0	0	0
Mike Palmateer	G	38	0	3	3	6	0	0	0	0
Pat Ribble	D	13	0	2	2	8	-9	0	0	0
Ron Wilson	D	5	0	2	2	2	-2	0	0	0
Mark Kirton	C	2	1	0	1	2	0	0	0	0
Larry Carriere	D	2	0	1	1	0	-1	0	0	0
Paul Harrison	G	30	0	1	1	4	0	0	0	0
Bruce Boudreau	C	2	0	0	0	2	0	0	0	0
Jiri Crha	G	15	0	0	0	4	0	0	0	0
Jimmy Jones	RW	1	0	0	0	0	-1	0	0	0
Daryl Maggs	D	5	0	0	0	0	-4	0	0	0
Curt Ridley	G	3	0	0	0	2	0	0	0	0
Vincent Tremblay	G	10	0	0	0	0	0	0	0	0

Goaltending

Player	MIN	GP	W	L	T	GA	GAA	SO
Mike Palmateer	2039	38	16	14	3	125	3.68	2
Paul Harrison	1492	30	9	17	2	110	4.42	0
Jiri Crha	830	15	8	7	0	50	3.61	0
Vincent Tremblay	329	10	2	1	0	28	5.11	0
Curt Ridley	110	3	0	1	0	8	4.36	0
Team:	4800	80	35	40	5	321	4.01	2

=== Playoffs ===
Scoring

Player	Pos	GP	G	A	Pts	PIM	PPG	SHG	GWG
Darryl Sittler	C	3	1	2	3	10	1	0	0
Ron Wilson	D	3	1	2	3	2	1	0	0
Ian Turnbull	D	3	0	3	3	2	0	0	0
Terry Martin	LW	3	2	0	2	7	0	0	0
John Anderson	RW	3	1	1	2	0	0	0	0
Laurie Boschman	C	3	1	1	2	18	1	0	0
Borje Salming	D	3	1	1	2	2	1	0	0
Wilf Paiement	RW	3	0	2	2	17	0	0	0
Rick Vaive	RW	3	1	0	1	11	0	0	0
Dave Burrows	D	3	0	1	1	2	0	0	0
Larry Carriere	D	2	0	0	0	0	0	0	0
Jiri Crha	G	2	0	0	0	0	0	0	0
Bill Derlago	C	3	0	0	0	4	0	0	0
Ron Ellis	RW	3	0	0	0	0	0	0	0
Dave Farrish	D	3	0	0	0	10	0	0	0
Pat Hickey	LW	3	0	0	0	2	0	0	0
Mike Kaszycki	C	2	0	0	0	2	0	0	0
Richard Mulhern	D	1	0	0	0	0	0	0	0
Mike Palmateer	G	1	0	0	0	2	0	0	0
Rocky Saganiuk	RW/C	3	0	0	0	10	0	0	0

Goaltending

Player	MIN	GP	W	L	GA	GAA	SO
Jiri Crha	121	2	0	2	10	4.96	0
Mike Palmateer	60	1	0	1	7	7.00	0
Team:	181	3	0	3	17	5.64	0

Note:

Pos = Position;GP = Games played; G = Goals; A = Assists; Pts = Points; PIM = Penalty minutes; +/- = Plus/minus; PPG = Power-play goals; SHG = Short-handed goals; GWG = Game-winning goals
Pos = Position;GP = Games played; Min, TOI = Minutes played; W = Wins; L = Losses; T,T/OT = Ties; OTL = Overtime losses; GA = Goals-against; GAA = Goals-against average; SO = Shutouts; SA = Shots against; SV = Shots saved;SV% = Save percentage;

== Awards and records ==
- Borje Salming, runner-up, Norris Trophy
- Borje Salming was voted to the Second Team All-Stars (a rarity in that usually the runner-up for the Norris joins the Norris winner on the First Team All-Stars).

== Transactions ==
The Maple Leafs have been involved in the following transactions during the 1979–80 season.

=== Trades ===
August 22, 1979	To Edmonton Oilers 6th round pick in 1981 – Steve Smith	To Toronto Maple Leafs Reg Thomas
December 13, 1979	To Quebec Nordiques Reg Thomas	To Toronto Maple Leafs Dave Farrish; Terry Martin
December 24, 1979	To Hartford Whalers Pat Boutette	To Toronto Maple Leafs Bob Stephenson
December 29, 1979	To Colorado Rockies Lanny McDonald; Joel Quenneville	To Toronto Maple Leafs Pat Hickey; Wilf Paiement
January 10, 1980	To Chicago Black Hawks Dave Hutchison	To Toronto Maple Leafs Pat Ribble
February 10, 1980	To Vancouver Canucks Cash	To Toronto Maple Leafs Curt Ridley
February 16, 1980	To Washington Capitals Pat Ribble	To Toronto Maple Leafs Mike Kaszycki
February 18, 1980	To Vancouver Canucks Tiger Williams; Jerry Butler	To Toronto Maple Leafs Rick Vaive; Bill Derlago
March 3, 1980	To Colorado Rockies Walt McKechnie	To Toronto Maple Leafs 3rd round pick in 1980 – Fred Boimistruck
June 10, 1980	To Calgary Flames 2nd round pick in 1980 – Kevin LaVallee	To Toronto Maple Leafs David Shand; 3rd round pick in 1980 – Torrie Robertson
June 11, 1980	To Washington Capitals Mike Palmateer; 3rd round pick in 1980 – Torrie Robertson	To Toronto Maple Leafs Tim Coulis; Robert Picard; 2nd round pick in 1980 – Bob McGill

=== Waivers ===
February 10, 1980	From Los Angeles Kings Richard Mulhern

=== Free agents ===
Player	Former team
Daryl Maggs	Cincinnati Stingers (WHA)
Carl Brewer	Toronto Toros (WHA)
Jiri Crha	HC Pardubice (Czech.)
Larry Carriere	Buffalo Sabres

Player	New team
Greg Hubick	Vancouver Canucks
Roy Sommer	Edmonton Oilers

== Farm teams ==
The Maple Leafs were affiliated with the New Brunswick Hawks of the American Hockey League.
