= 1979–80 Los Angeles Kings season =

National Hockey League team season

1979–80 Los Angeles Kings
- Division: 2nd Norris
- Conference: 6th Wales
- 1979–80 record: 30–36–14
- Home record: 18–13–9
- Road record: 12–23–5
- Goals for: 290
- Goals against: 313

Team information
- General manager: George Maguire
- Coach: Bob Berry
- Captain: Mike Murphy
- Alternate captains: None
- Arena: Los Angeles Forum
- Average attendance: 10,453 (65.3%)

Team leaders
- Goals: Charlie Simmer (56)
- Assists: Marcel Dionne (84)
- Points: Marcel Dionne (137)
- Penalty minutes: Jay Wells (113)
- Wins: Mario Lessard (18)
- Goals against average: Doug Keans (2.48)

The 1979–80 Los Angeles Kings season was the Kings' 13th season in the National Hockey League (NHL). It saw the Kings qualify for the playoffs, placing second in the Norris Division, but they lost in the first round to the New York Islanders. Just prior to the end of the season, the Kings sent Butch Goring to the Islanders for Billy Harris and Dave Lewis. Goring would help the Islanders defeat the Kings on their way to their first of 4 Stanley Cup wins. They also had the worst penalty kill percentage in a season in the history of the NHL at 67.70%.

== Regular season ==
=== Final standings ===
Norris Division
	GP	W	L	T	GF	GA	Pts
**Montreal Canadiens**	80	47	20	13	328	240	107
**Los Angeles Kings**	80	30	36	14	290	313	74
**Pittsburgh Penguins**	80	30	37	13	251	303	73
**Hartford Whalers**	80	27	34	19	303	312	73
Detroit Red Wings	80	26	43	11	268	306	63

Note: GP = Games played, W = Wins, L = Losses, T = Ties, Pts = Points, GF = Goals for, GA = Goals against
Note: Teams that qualified for the playoffs are highlighted in bold.

League standings
R		Div	GP	W	L	T	GF	GA	Pts
1	**p – Philadelphia Flyers**	PTK	80	48	12	20	327	254	116
2	**y – Buffalo Sabres**	ADM	80	47	17	16	318	201	110
3	**x – Montreal Canadiens**	NRS	80	47	20	13	328	240	107
4	**Boston Bruins**	ADM	80	46	21	13	310	234	105
5	**New York Islanders**	PTK	80	39	28	13	281	247	91
6	**Minnesota North Stars**	ADM	80	36	28	16	311	253	88
7	**x – Chicago Black Hawks**	SMY	80	34	27	19	241	250	87
8	**New York Rangers**	PTK	80	38	32	10	308	284	86
9	**Atlanta Flames**	PTK	80	35	32	13	282	269	83
10	**St. Louis Blues**	SMY	80	34	34	12	266	278	80
11	**Toronto Maple Leafs**	ADM	80	35	40	5	304	327	75
12	**Los Angeles Kings**	NRS	80	30	36	14	290	313	74
13	**Pittsburgh Penguins**	NRS	80	30	37	13	251	303	73
14	**Hartford Whalers**	NRS	80	27	34	19	303	312	73
15	**Vancouver Canucks**	SMY	80	27	37	16	256	281	70
16	**Edmonton Oilers**	SMY	80	28	39	13	301	322	69
17	Washington Capitals	PTK	80	27	40	13	261	293	67
18	Detroit Red Wings	NRS	80	26	43	11	268	306	63
19	Quebec Nordiques	ADM	80	25	44	11	248	313	61
20	Winnipeg Jets	SMY	80	20	49	11	214	314	51
21	Colorado Rockies	SMY	80	19	48	13	234	308	51

Divisions: ADM – Adams, NRS – Norris, PTK – Patrick, SMY – Smythe

bold – The top 16 teams in the league qualified for the playoffs, regardless of division or conference.
x – Won division; y – Won Conference (and division); p – Won Presidents' Trophy (and conference and division)

=== Record vs. opponents ===
Norris Division record vs. opponents

==== Vs. Wales Conference ====
**Vs. Norris Division**

1979–80 NHL records
Team	**DET**	**HFD**	**LAK**	**MTL**	**PIT**	**Total**
Detroit	—	1–2–1	0–3–1	0–3–1	2–2	**3–10–3**
Hartford	2–1–1	—	2–1–1	0–1–3	2–1–1	**6–4–6**
Los Angeles	3–0–1	1–2–1	—	0–4	1–1–2	**5–7–4**
Montreal	3–0–1	1–0–3	4–0	—	2–1–1	**10–1–5**
Pittsburgh	2–2	1–2–1	1–1–2	1–2–1	—	**5–7–4**

**Vs. Adams Division**

1979–80 NHL records
Team	**BOS**	**BUF**	**MIN**	**QUE**	**TOR**	**Total**
Detroit	1–2–1	1–3	2–1–1	2–1–1	0–4	**6–11–3**
Hartford	1–2–1	1–3	0–4	1–1–2	2–2	**5–12–3**
Los Angeles	1–2–1	0–3–1	2–0–2	3–1	3–0–1	**9–6–5**
Montreal	3–1	1–1–2	3–1	2–1–1	3–1	**12–5–3**
Pittsburgh	2–2	0–4	1–3	2–2	2–2	**7–13–0**

==== Vs. Campbell Conference ====
**Vs. Patrick Division**

1979–80 NHL records
Team	**ATL**	**NYI**	**NYR**	**PHI**	**WSH**	**Total**
Detroit	1–2–1	3–1	1–3	0–3–1	2–1–1	**7–10–3**
Hartford	3–1	1–3	1–2–1	0–2–2	1–2–1	**6–10–4**
Los Angeles	1–2–1	1–2–1	1–3	0–4	1–3	**4–14–2**
Montreal	3–0–1	0–3–1	3–0–1	2–1–1	2–1–1	**10–5–5**
Pittsburgh	2–1–1	1–0–3	2–2	0–3–1	3–1	**8–7–5**

**Vs. Smythe Division**

1979–80 NHL records
Team	**CHI**	**COL**	**EDM**	**STL**	**VAN**	**WIN**	**Total**
Detroit	1−3	1−3	2−1–1	1−2−1	2−2	3−1	**10−12−2**
Hartford	1–1–2	2−1−1	2–1–1	2–2	1−1−2	2−2	**10−8−6**
Los Angeles	3−0−1	4−0	1−2−1	1−3	2−2	1−2−1	**12−9−3**
Montreal	2−2	3−1	3−1	2−2	2−2	3−1	**15−9−0**
Pittsburgh	0−2–2	2−2	1−3	1−2–1	2−1–1	4−0	**10−10−4**

== Schedule and results ==
1979–80 regular season
October

Game	Result	Date	Score	Opponent	Record
1	T	October 10, 1979	4–4	Detroit Red Wings (1979–80)	0–0–1
2	W	October 13, 1979	5–3	St. Louis Blues (1979–80)	1–0–1
3	L	October 16, 1979	6–8	@ Washington Capitals (1979–80)	1–1–1
4	W	October 17, 1979	5–4	@ Pittsburgh Penguins (1979–80)	2–1–1
5	L	October 19, 1979	3–6	@ Hartford Whalers (1979–80)	2–2–1
6	L	October 20, 1979	4–5	@ Boston Bruins (1979–80)	2–3–1
7	W	October 23, 1979	7–4	@ Colorado Rockies (1979–80)	3–3–1
8	W	October 24, 1979	5–3	Washington Capitals (1979–80)	4–3–1
9	W	October 27, 1979	7–5	Toronto Maple Leafs (1979–80)	5–3–1
10	T	October 30, 1979	4–4	Boston Bruins (1979–80)	5–3–2

November

Game	Result	Date	Score	Opponent	Record
11	W	November 1, 1979	4–2	New York Rangers (1979–80)	6–3–2
12	L	November 3, 1979	1–4	@ St. Louis Blues (1979–80)	6–4–2
13	W	November 4, 1979	5–3	@ Chicago Black Hawks (1979–80)	7–4–2
14	L	November 6, 1979	1–4	@ New York Islanders (1979–80)	7–5–2
15	L	November 7, 1979	4–8	@ New York Rangers (1979–80)	7–6–2
16	T	November 10, 1979	6–6	Minnesota North Stars (1979–80)	7–6–3
17	W	November 13, 1979	4–1	Colorado Rockies (1979–80)	8–6–3
18	T	November 15, 1979	3–3	Pittsburgh Penguins (1979–80)	8–6–4
19	L	November 17, 1979	1–3	Montreal Canadiens (1979–80)	8–7–4
20	W	November 20, 1979	5–1	@ Vancouver Canucks (1979–80)	9–7–4
21	L	November 21, 1979	4–6	Philadelphia Flyers (1979–80)	9–8–4
22	T	November 24, 1979	4–4	New York Islanders (1979–80)	9–8–5
23	W	November 27, 1979	5–3	Winnipeg Jets (1979–80)	10–8–5

December

Game	Result	Date	Score	Opponent	Record
24	W	December 1, 1979	7–0	Chicago Black Hawks (1979–80)	11–8–5
25	W	December 4, 1979	6–2	@ Atlanta Flames (1979–80)	12–8–5
26	L	December 6, 1979	4–9	@ Philadelphia Flyers (1979–80)	12–9–5
27	L	December 7, 1979	2–5	@ Montreal Canadiens (1979–80)	12–10–5
28	L	December 9, 1979	2–3	@ Quebec Nordiques (1979–80)	12–11–5
29	W	December 12, 1979	7–4	Hartford Whalers (1979–80)	13–11–5
30	W	December 15, 1979	4–3	Vancouver Canucks (1979–80)	14–11–5
31	T	December 19, 1979	4–4	@ Toronto Maple Leafs (1979–80)	14–11–6
32	L	December 20, 1979	3–5	@ Buffalo Sabres (1979–80)	14–12–6
33	W	December 22, 1979	9–3	Edmonton Oilers (1979–80)	15–12–6
34	W	December 27, 1979	3–0	Quebec Nordiques (1979–80)	16–12–6
35	W	December 29, 1979	4–3	Minnesota North Stars (1979–80)	17–12–6

January

Game	Result	Date	Score	Opponent	Record
36	W	January 2, 1980	4–2	@ Detroit Red Wings (1979–80)	18–12–6
37	T	January 5, 1980	3–3	@ Edmonton Oilers (1979–80)	18–12–7
38	T	January 6, 1980	4–4	@ Winnipeg Jets (1979–80)	18–12–8
39	L	January 8, 1980	3–6	@ St. Louis Blues (1979–80)	18–13–8
40	W	January 9, 1980	6–1	@ Chicago Black Hawks (1979–80)	19–13–8
41	W	January 12, 1980	6–5	@ Minnesota North Stars (1979–80)	20–13–8
42	L	January 13, 1980	3–5	@ Winnipeg Jets (1979–80)	20–14–8
43	L	January 16, 1980	2–4	Buffalo Sabres (1979–80)	20–15–8
44	L	January 19, 1980	2–4	Atlanta Flames (1979–80)	20–16–8
45	L	January 22, 1980	4–5	New York Rangers (1979–80)	20–17–8
46	W	January 24, 1980	5–4	Toronto Maple Leafs (1979–80)	21–17–8
47	T	January 26, 1980	4–4	@ Minnesota North Stars (1979–80)	21–17–9
48	L	January 27, 1980	1–9	@ Buffalo Sabres (1979–80)	21–18–9
49	L	January 29, 1980	3–7	Winnipeg Jets (1979–80)	21–19–9
50	L	January 30, 1980	1–8	Edmonton Oilers (1979–80)	21–20–9

February

Game	Result	Date	Score	Opponent	Record
51	L	February 2, 1980	4–5	Montreal Canadiens (1979–80)	21–21–9
52	L	February 3, 1980	3–5	@ Edmonton Oilers (1979–80)	21–22–9
53	L	February 6, 1980	3–7	@ Hartford Whalers (1979–80)	21–23–9
54	L	February 7, 1980	1–4	@ New York Islanders (1979–80)	21–24–9
55	W	February 9, 1980	7–2	@ Toronto Maple Leafs (1979–80)	22–24–9
56	L	February 10, 1980	2–5	@ Philadelphia Flyers (1979–80)	22–25–9
57	L	February 12, 1980	2–5	Washington Capitals (1979–80)	22–26–9
58	L	February 14, 1980	4–6	St. Louis Blues (1979–80)	22–27–9
59	W	February 16, 1980	3–2	New York Islanders (1979–80)	23–27–9
60	W	February 18, 1980	4–2	@ Detroit Red Wings (1979–80)	24–27–9
61	W	February 20, 1980	3–0	Boston Bruins (1979–80)	25–27–9
62	L	February 23, 1980	1–5	Philadelphia Flyers (1979–80)	25–28–9
63	L	February 26, 1980	3–5	@ Washington Capitals (1979–80)	25–29–9
64	L	February 27, 1980	4–5	@ New York Rangers (1979–80)	25–30–9

March

Game	Result	Date	Score	Opponent	Record
65	L	March 1, 1980	0–4	@ Boston Bruins (1979–80)	25–31–9
66	W	March 2, 1980	4–3	@ Quebec Nordiques (1979–80)	26–31–9
67	L	March 5, 1980	1–3	Atlanta Flames (1979–80)	26–32–9
68	T	March 8, 1980	3–3	Chicago Black Hawks (1979–80)	26–32–10
69	L	March 10, 1980	3–6	@ Montreal Canadiens (1979–80)	26–33–10
70	L	March 12, 1980	2–4	@ Pittsburgh Penguins (1979–80)	26–34–10
71	T	March 13, 1980	2–2	@ Atlanta Flames (1979–80)	26–34–11
72	T	March 15, 1980	2–2	Buffalo Sabres (1979–80)	26–34–12
73	W	March 19, 1980	4–3	Detroit Red Wings (1979–80)	27–34–12
74	W	March 22, 1980	4–1	Quebec Nordiques (1979–80)	28–34–12
75	W	March 25, 1980	5–2	@ Colorado Rockies (1979–80)	29–34–12
76	T	March 27, 1980	2–2	Pittsburgh Penguins (1979–80)	29–34–13
77	T	March 29, 1980	2–2	Hartford Whalers (1979–80)	29–34–14

April

Game	Result	Date	Score	Opponent	Record
78	W	April 1, 1980	4–3	Colorado Rockies (1979–80)	30–34–14
79	L	April 3, 1980	2–4	@ Vancouver Canucks (1979–80)	30–35–14
80	L	April 5, 1980	3–5	Vancouver Canucks (1979–80)	30–36–14

Legend: Win (2 points) Loss (0 points) Tie (1 point)

== Player statistics ==
Regular season
Scoring

Player	Pos	GP	G	A	Pts	PIM	+/-	PPG	SHG	GWG
Marcel Dionne	C	80	53	84	137	32	35	17	0	6
Charlie Simmer	LW	64	56	45	101	65	47	21	0	8
Dave Taylor	RW	61	37	53	90	72	39	12	0	7
Butch Goring	C	69	20	48	68	12	-21	2	1	1
Doug Halward	D	63	11	45	56	52	14	8	0	0
Mike Murphy	RW	80	27	22	49	29	-12	7	3	1
Robert Palmer	D	78	4	36	40	18	29	1	0	0
Steve Jensen	LW	76	21	15	36	13	-39	4	2	2
Andre St. Laurent	C	77	6	24	30	88	-13	1	0	0
Glenn Goldup	RW	55	10	11	21	78	-4	1	0	1
Steve Carlson	C	52	9	12	21	23	-7	1	0	1
Syl Apps Jr.	C	51	5	16	21	12	-17	1	0	0
Randy Manery	D	52	6	10	16	48	-13	3	0	0
Dean Hopkins	RW	60	8	6	14	39	-16	1	0	2
Brad Selwood	D	63	1	13	14	82	-14	1	0	0
Barry Gibbs	D	63	2	9	11	32	-13	0	0	0
Billy Harris	RW	11	4	3	7	6	4	1	0	1
Bert Wilson	LW	75	4	3	7	91	-19	1	1	0
Don Howse	LW	33	2	5	7	6	-16	0	0	0
John Paul Kelly	LW	40	2	5	7	28	-6	0	0	0
Jerry Korab	D	11	1	2	3	34	-3	0	0	0
Richard Mulhern	D	15	0	3	3	16	1	0	0	0
Dave Lewis	D	11	1	1	2	12	3	0	0	0
Ron Grahame	G	26	0	1	1	2	0	0	0	0
Mark Hardy	D	15	0	1	1	10	-7	0	0	0
Randy Holt	D	42	0	1	1	94	-3	0	0	0
Rick Hampton	LW/D	3	0	0	0	0	3	0	0	0
Doug Keans	G	10	0	0	0	0	0	0	0	0
Mario Lessard	G	50	0	0	0	6	0	0	0	0
Mike Marson	LW	3	0	0	0	5	-2	0	0	0
Jay Wells	D	43	0	0	0	113	-22	0	0	0

Goaltending

Player	MIN	GP	W	L	T	GA	GAA	SO
Mario Lessard	2836	50	18	22	7	185	3.91	0
Ron Grahame	1405	26	9	11	4	98	4.19	2
Doug Keans	559	10	3	3	3	23	2.47	0
Team:	4800	80	30	36	14	306	3.83	2

Playoffs
Scoring

Player	Pos	GP	G	A	Pts	PIM	PPG	SHG	GWG
Dave Taylor	RW	4	2	1	3	4	0	0	0
Robert Palmer	D	4	1	2	3	4	0	0	0
Marcel Dionne	C	4	0	3	3	4	0	0	0
Charlie Simmer	LW	3	2	0	2	0	1	0	0
Steve Carlson	C	4	1	1	2	7	0	0	0
Mark Hardy	D	4	1	1	2	9	0	0	0
Glenn Goldup	RW	4	1	0	1	0	0	0	0
Mike Murphy	RW	4	1	0	1	2	0	1	0
Andre St. Laurent	C	4	1	0	1	0	0	1	1
Dean Hopkins	RW	4	0	1	1	5	0	0	0
Jerry Korab	D	3	0	1	1	11	0	0	0
Dave Lewis	D	4	0	1	1	2	0	0	0
Barry Gibbs	D	1	0	0	0	0	0	0	0
Doug Halward	D	1	0	0	0	2	0	0	0
Billy Harris	RW	4	0	0	0	2	0	0	0
Don Howse	LW	2	0	0	0	0	0	0	0
Steve Jensen	LW	4	0	0	0	2	0	0	0
Doug Keans	G	1	0	0	0	0	0	0	0
John Paul Kelly	LW	3	0	0	0	2	0	0	0
Mario Lessard	G	4	0	0	0	0	0	0	0
Brad Selwood	D	1	0	0	0	0	0	0	0
Jay Wells	D	4	0	0	0	11	0	0	0
Bert Wilson	LW	2	0	0	0	4	0	0	0

Goaltending

Player	MIN	GP	W	L	GA	GAA	SO
Mario Lessard	207	4	1	2	14	4.06	0
Doug Keans	40	1	0	1	7	10.50	0
Team:	247	4	1	3	21	5.10	0

Note:

Pos = Position;GP = Games played; G = Goals; A = Assists; Pts = Points; PIM = Penalty minutes; +/- = Plus/minus; PPG = Power-play goals; SHG = Short-handed goals; GWG = Game-winning goals
Pos = Position;GP = Games played; Min, TOI = Minutes played; W = Wins; L = Losses; T,T/OT = Ties; OTL = Overtime losses; GA = Goals-against; GAA = Goals-against average; SO = Shutouts; SA = Shots against; SV = Shots saved;SV% = Save percentage;

== Transactions ==
The Kings were involved in the following transactions during the 1979–80 season.

=== Trades ===
June 9, 1979	To Los Angeles Kings Barry Gibbs	To New York Islanders Tom Williams
June 11, 1979	To Los Angeles Kings Mike Marson	To Washington Capitals Steve Clippingdale
August 16, 1979	To Los Angeles Kings Cash	To St. Louis Blues Tom Williams
September 14, 1979	To Los Angeles Kings Brad Selwood; 4th round pick in 1982 – Dave Ross	To Montreal Canadiens 4th round pick in 1982 – John DeVoe
March 10, 1980	To Los Angeles Kings Billy Harris; Dave Lewis	To New York Islanders Butch Goring
March 10, 1980	To Los Angeles Kings Jerry Korab	To Buffalo Sabres 1st round pick in 1982 – Phil Housley

=== Free agent signings ===
October 1, 1979	From Montreal Canadiens Don Howse
October 11, 1979	From Saginaw Gears (IHL) Scott Gruhl

=== Free agents lost ===
January 21, 1980	To Philadelphia Flyers Dave Gardner

=== Free agent compensation ===
August 22, 1979	To Los Angeles Kings Andre St. Laurent; 1st round pick in 1980 – Larry Murphy; 1st round pick in 1981 – Doug Smith	To Detroit Red Wings Dale McCourt; Rogie Vachon

=== Waivers ===
February 10, 1980	To Toronto Maple Leafs Richard Mulhern

=== Expansion draft ===
June 13, 1979	To Edmonton Oilers Larry Brown
June 13, 1979	To Quebec Nordiques Hartland Monahan
June 13, 1979	To Winnipeg Jets Dennis Abgrall
June 13, 1979	To Winnipeg Jets Mark Heaslip

== Draft picks ==
Los Angeles's draft picks at the 1979 NHL entry draft held at the Queen Elizabeth Hotel in Montreal.

Round	#	Player	Nationality	College/Junior/Club team (League)
1	16	Jay Wells	Canada	Kingston Canadians (OHL)
2	29	Dean Hopkins	Canada	London Knights (OMJHL)
2	30	Mark Hardy	Canada	Montreal Juniors (QMJHL)
3	50	John-Paul Kelly	Canada	New Westminster Bruins (WHL)
4	71	John Gibson	Canada	Niagara Falls Flyers (OMJHL)
5	92	Jim Brown	United States	University of Notre Dame (WCHA)
6	113	Jay McFarlane	Canada	University of Wisconsin (WCHA)

== See also ==
- 1979–80 NHL season
