= 1979–80 Quebec Nordiques season =

National Hockey League team season

1979–80 Quebec Nordiques
- Division: 5th Adams
- Conference: 10th Wales
- 1979–80 record: 25–44–11
- Home record: 17–16–7
- Road record: 8–28–4
- Goals for: 248
- Goals against: 313

Team information
- General manager: Maurice Filion
- Coach: Jacques Demers
- Captain: Marc Tardif
- Arena: Colisée de Québec
- Average attendance: 10,742
- Minor league affiliate: Syracuse Firebirds (AHL)

Team leaders
- Goals: Real Cloutier (42)
- Assists: Real Cloutier (47)
- Points: Real Cloutier (89)
- Penalty minutes: Paul Baxter (145)
- Plus/minus: Robbie Ftorek (+6)
- Wins: Michel Dion (15)
- Goals against average: Michel Dion (3.70)

The 1979–80 Quebec Nordiques season was the Nordiques eighth season overall, however, it marked as their expansion season in the National Hockey League (NHL). Quebec had played their previous seven seasons in the now defunct World Hockey Association. In 1978–79, their last season in the WHA, Quebec finished the year with the second best record, as they had a 41–34–5 record, earning 87 points. The Nordiques were then swept by the Winnipeg Jets in the WHA semi-finals. In the NHL, the team finished out of the playoffs.

== Off-season ==
During the off-season, the Nordiques, Edmonton Oilers, New England Whalers, and Winnipeg Jets were admitted into the NHL as expansion teams. Quebec would be placed in the Adams Division in the Wales Conference. The other teams in the Nordiques division was the Boston Bruins, Buffalo Sabres, Minnesota North Stars and Toronto Maple Leafs. Quebec held on to head coach Jacques Demers.

As many of the WHA players had their rights held by NHL teams, those NHL teams were allowed to reclaim their players. In order to keep the NHL from taking all the talent from the WHA-turned-NHL teams, each incoming franchise was allowed to protect up to two goaltenders and two skaters. These were designated as "priority selections" in the 1979 NHL expansion draft. The Nordiques made a deal with the Chicago Black Hawks, in which Quebec would keep Réal Cloutier in exchange for the Nordiques first round draft pick in the 1980 NHL entry draft. Quebec made a deal with the Montreal Canadiens in which Montreal selected Dan Geoffrion and Alain Cote from the Nordiques, rather than Marc Tardif and Richard David. In exchange for this, the Nordiques relinquished a third round pick in the 1980 NHL entry draft, a second round pick in the 1981 NHL entry draft, and that the Nordiques would draft Alain Cote from the Canadiens at the 1979 NHL expansion draft.

On June 28, 1979, the Nordiques acquired Jamie Hislop from the Winnipeg Jets in exchange for Barry Legge. Hislop played with the Cincinnati Stingers in the 1978–79, as he scored 30 goals and 70 points in 80 games.

The Nordiques acquired goaltender Goran Hogosta from the New York Islanders for goaltender Richard Brodeur. Hogosta played the 1978–79 season with the Fort Worth Texans, earning a record of 25–29–4 with a 3.51 GAA and a .877 save percentage. Brodeur had been with the Nordiques during their entire existence in the WHA. In 1978–79, Brodeur had a 25–13–3 record with a 3.11 GAA and a .901 save percentage with Quebec.

At the 1979 NHL entry draft held on August 9, the Nordiques selected Michel Goulet from the Birmingham Bulls of the World Hockey Association in the first round, 20th overall. In 78 games with the Bulls during the 1978–79, Goulet scored 28 goals and 58 points. In the second round, Quebec selected Dale Hunter from the Sudbury Wolves of the Ontario Major Junior Hockey League. Hunter scored 34 goals and 85 points in 61 games during the 1978–79 season. In the fourth round, the Nordiques selected Anton Stastny from Slovan ChZJD Bratislava of the Czechoslovak First Ice Hockey League. Stastny scored 32 goals and 51 points in 44 games during the 1978–79 season.

Quebec signed free agent Robbie Ftorek on August 13, who played the 1978–79 season with the Cincinnati Stingers of the World Hockey Association. Ftorek finished second in WHA scoring with 39 goals and 77 assists to earn 116 points in 80 games. Ftorek has previous NHL experience, as in 15 games with the Detroit Red Wings from 1972 to 1974, Ftorek scored two goals and seven points.

== Regular season ==
Adams Division teams

Quebec played in their first ever NHL game on October 10, 1979, at Le Colisée in Quebec City, as the Nordiques lost 5–3 to the Atlanta Flames. The Nords won their first ever NHL game in their third game, defeating the Colorado Rockies 5–2 in Denver, Colorado. During the first half of the season, the Nordiques were very competitive, earning a 17–17–6 record as they held on to a playoff position, however, wins were few and far between in the second half of the year, as Quebec fell into last place, and finished the year 25–44–11, earning 61 points, and missing the post-season.

Offensively, the Nordiques were led by Real Cloutier, who in his first NHL season, had a team best 42 goals and 47 assists for 89 points. Real Cloutier scored three goals in his National League Debut. Marc Tardif had a solid season, scoring 33 goals and 68 points, while the Nordiques first round draft pick, Michel Goulet, had 22 goals and 54 points to finish in third in team scoring. On the blue line, Dale Hoganson led the way, earning 40 points, while Pierre Lacroix scored 9 goals and 30 points. Paul Baxter led the club with 145 penalty minutes.

In goal, Michel Dion saw most of the action, appearing in 50 games, earning a team high 15 victories and a 3.70 GAA, as well as two shutouts.

=== Season standings ===
Adams Division
	GP	W	L	T	GF	GA	Pts
**Buffalo Sabres**	80	47	17	16	318	201	110
**Boston Bruins**	80	46	21	13	310	234	105
**Minnesota North Stars**	80	36	28	16	311	253	88
**Toronto Maple Leafs**	80	35	40	5	304	327	75
Quebec Nordiques	80	25	44	11	248	313	61

Note: GP = Games played, W = Wins, L = Losses, T = Ties, Pts = Points, GF = Goals for, GA = Goals against
Note: Teams that qualified for the playoffs are highlighted in bold.

League standings
R		Div	GP	W	L	T	GF	GA	Pts
1	**p – Philadelphia Flyers**	PTK	80	48	12	20	327	254	116
2	**y – Buffalo Sabres**	ADM	80	47	17	16	318	201	110
3	**x – Montreal Canadiens**	NRS	80	47	20	13	328	240	107
4	**Boston Bruins**	ADM	80	46	21	13	310	234	105
5	**New York Islanders**	PTK	80	39	28	13	281	247	91
6	**Minnesota North Stars**	ADM	80	36	28	16	311	253	88
7	**x – Chicago Black Hawks**	SMY	80	34	27	19	241	250	87
8	**New York Rangers**	PTK	80	38	32	10	308	284	86
9	**Atlanta Flames**	PTK	80	35	32	13	282	269	83
10	**St. Louis Blues**	SMY	80	34	34	12	266	278	80
11	**Toronto Maple Leafs**	ADM	80	35	40	5	304	327	75
12	**Los Angeles Kings**	NRS	80	30	36	14	290	313	74
13	**Pittsburgh Penguins**	NRS	80	30	37	13	251	303	73
14	**Hartford Whalers**	NRS	80	27	34	19	303	312	73
15	**Vancouver Canucks**	SMY	80	27	37	16	256	281	70
16	**Edmonton Oilers**	SMY	80	28	39	13	301	322	69
17	Washington Capitals	PTK	80	27	40	13	261	293	67
18	Detroit Red Wings	NRS	80	26	43	11	268	306	63
19	Quebec Nordiques	ADM	80	25	44	11	248	313	61
20	Winnipeg Jets	SMY	80	20	49	11	214	314	51
21	Colorado Rockies	SMY	80	19	48	13	234	308	51

Divisions: ADM – Adams, NRS – Norris, PTK – Patrick, SMY – Smythe

bold – The top 16 teams in the league qualified for the playoffs, regardless of division or conference.
x – Won division; y – Won Conference (and division); p – Won Presidents' Trophy (and conference and division)

=== Record vs. opponents ===
Adams Division record vs. opponents

==== Vs. Wales Conference ====
**Vs. Adams Division**

1979–80 NHL records
Team	**BOS**	**BUF**	**MIN**	**QUE**	**TOR**	**Total**
Boston	—	2–1–1	2–2	4–0	4–0	**12–3–1**
Buffalo	1–2–1	—	2–1–1	3–1	4–0	**10–4–2**
Minnesota	2–2	1–2–1	—	2–1–1	2–2	**7–7–2**
Quebec	0–4	1–3	1–2–1	—	3–1	**5–10–1**
Toronto	0–4	0–4	2–2	1–3	—	**3–13–0**

**Vs. Norris Division**

1979–80 NHL records
Team	**DET**	**HFD**	**LAK**	**MTL**	**PIT**	**Total**
Boston	2–1–1	2–1–1	2–1–1	1–3	2–2	**9–8–3**
Buffalo	3–1	3–1	3–0–1	1–1–2	4–0	**14–3–3**
Minnesota	1–2–1	4–0	0–2–2	1–3	3–1	**9–8–3**
Quebec	1–2–1	1–1–2	1–3	1–2–1	2–2	**6–10–4**
Toronto	4–0	2–2	0–3–1	1–3	2–2	**9–10–1**

==== Vs. Campbell Conference ====
**Vs. Patrick Division**

1979–80 NHL records
Team	**ATL**	**NYI**	**NYR**	**PHI**	**WSH**	**Total**
Boston	4–0	3–1	2–2	1–1–2	2–1–1	**12–5–3**
Buffalo	3–0–1	2–1–1	2–1–1	0–3–1	4–0	**11–5–4**
Minnesota	1–1–2	2–0–2	2–1–1	1–3	3–0–1	**9–5–6**
Quebec	0–3–1	0–4	1–2–1	0–3–1	1–1–2	**2–13–5**
Toronto	3–1	1–3	2–2	1–1–2	3–1	**10–8–2**

**Vs. Smythe Division**

1979–80 NHL records
Team	**CHI**	**COL**	**EDM**	**STL**	**VAN**	**WIN**	**Total**
Boston	2−2	2−1−1	4−0	1−1−2	1−0−3	3−1	**13−5−6**
Buffalo	1−1−2	3−1	2−1−1	2−2	1−0−3	3−0−1	**12−5−7**
Minnesota	1−2−1	3−1	1−1−2	3−1	1−2−1	2−1−1	**11−8−5**
Quebec	1−2−1	3−1	2−2	2−2	2−2	2−2	**12−11−1**
Toronto	0−4	3−0−1	1−2−1	2−2	3−1	4−0	**13−9−2**

== Schedule and results ==
1979–80 regular season
October

Game	Date	Visitor	Score	Home	Record	Points	Attendance
1	October 10	Atlanta Flames	5–3	Quebec Nordiques	0–1–0	0	10,350
2	October 13	Quebec Nordiques	1–3	Montreal Canadiens	0–2–0	0	17,049
3	October 18	Quebec Nordiques	5–2	Colorado Rockies	1–2–0	2	6,389
4	October 19	Quebec Nordiques	3–6	Edmonton Oilers	1–3–0	2	15,386
5	October 21	Quebec Nordiques	3–0	Chicago Black Hawks	2–3–0	4	9,893
6	October 24	Hartford Whalers	2–2	Quebec Nordiques	2–3–1	5	10,445
7	October 27	Buffalo Sabres	3–0	Quebec Nordiques	2–4–1	5	10,896
8	October 28	Montreal Canadiens	4–5	Quebec Nordiques	3–4–1	7	11,908
9	October 31	Winnipeg Jets	5–2	Quebec Nordiques	3–5–1	7	10,430

November

Game	Date	Visitor	Score	Home	Record	Points	Attendance
10	November 2	Quebec Nordiques	4–4	Atlanta Flames	3–5–2	8	11,356
11	November 4	Detroit Red Wings	1–5	Quebec Nordiques	4–5–2	10	10,795
12	November 7	Philadelphia Flyers	4–3	Quebec Nordiques	4–6–2	10	11,899
13	November 10	Quebec Nordiques	4–5	New York Rangers	4–7–2	10	17,417
14	November 11	St. Louis Blues	1–4	Quebec Nordiques	5–7–2	12	10,260
15	November 14	Quebec Nordiques	2–7	Minnesota North Stars	5–8–2	12	10,955
16	November 16	Quebec Nordiques	3–2	Winnipeg Jets	6–8–2	14	12,401
17	November 18	Toronto Maple Leafs	2–4	Quebec Nordiques	7–8–2	16	10,577
18	November 20	Boston Bruins	5–3	Quebec Nordiques	7–9–2	16	11,897
19	November 22	Quebec Nordiques	4–7	Boston Bruins	7–10–2	16	11,699
20	November 24	Quebec Nordiques	4–4	Hartford Whalers	7–10–3	17	7,627
21	November 25	Washington Capitals	2–2	Quebec Nordiques	7–10–4	18	10,643
22	November 27	Quebec Nordiques	2–4	St. Louis Blues	7–11–4	18	8,360
23	November 28	Quebec Nordiques	2–7	Pittsburgh Penguins	7–12–4	18	8,396

December

Game	Date	Visitor	Score	Home	Record	Points	Attendance
24	December 1	Quebec Nordiques	2–7	Washington Capitals	7–13–4	18	6,892
25	December 2	Vancouver Canucks	1–3	Quebec Nordiques	8–13-4	20	10,567
26	December 4	Colorado Rockies	3–1	Quebec Nordiques	8–14–4	20	10,299
27	December 6	St. Louis Blues	2–5	Quebec Nordiques	9–14–4	22	10,347
28	December 9	Los Angeles Kings	2–3	Quebec Nordiques	10–14–4	24	11,168
29	December 12	Winnipeg Jets	0–5	Quebec Nordiques	11–14–4	26	10,326
30	December 13	Quebec Nordiques	4–6	Philadelphia Flyers	11–15–4	26	17,007
31	December 15	Quebec Nordiques	4–4	Detroit Red Wings	11–15–5	27	15,609
32	December 16	Pittsburgh Penguins	1–4	Quebec Nordiques	12–15–5	29	10,279
33	December 19	Colorado Rockies	3–6	Quebec Nordiques	13–15–5	31	10,806
34	December 23	Quebec Nordiques	3–1	Buffalo Sabres	14–15–5	33	16,433
35	December 27	Quebec Nordiques	0–3	Los Angeles Kings	14–16–5	33	9,978
36	December 29	Quebec Nordiques	2–6	Vancouver Canucks	14–17–5	33	13,615
37	December 30	Quebec Nordiques	2–1	Edmonton Oilers	15–17–5	35	15,423

January

Game	Date	Visitor	Score	Home	Record	Points	Attendance
38	January 2	New York Rangers	3–3	Quebec Nordiques	15–17–6	36	11,898
39	January 5	Quebec Nordiques	7–3	Toronto Maple Leafs	16–17–6	38	16,485
40	January 9	Edmonton Oilers	2–3	Quebec Nordiques	17–17–6	40	10,480
41	January 11	Quebec Nordiques	3–4	Atlanta Flames	17–18–6	40	9,246
42	January 12	Quebec Nordiques	2–8	St. Louis Blues	17–19–6	40	15,110
43	January 16	Boston Bruins	3–1	Quebec Nordiques	17–20–6	40	11,899
44	January 19	Quebec Nordiques	1–3	New York Islanders	17–21–6	40	14,995
45	January 20	Washington Capitals	2–3	Quebec Nordiques	18–21–6	42	10,097
46	January 23	Minnesota North Stars	4–6	Quebec Nordiques	19-21–6	44	10,710
47	January 26	Quebec Nordiques	1–1	Washington Capitals	19–21–7	45	9,479
48	January 27	Detroit Red Wings	7–6	Quebec Nordiques	19–22–7	45	10,765
49	January 30	Atlanta Flames	4–1	Quebec Nordiques	19–23–7	45	10,776

February

Game	Date	Visitor	Score	Home	Record	Points	Attendance
50	February 2	Quebec Nordiques	2–7	Boston Bruins	19–24–7	45	12,298
51	February 3	New York Rangers	4–5	Quebec Nordiques	20–24–7	47	11,075
52	February 6	Chicago Black Hawks	3–3	Quebec Nordiques	20–24–8	48	11,073
53	February 9	Quebec Nordiques	0–5	New York Islanders	20–25–8	48	14,995
54	February 10	Quebec Nordiques	1–3	New York Rangers	20–26–8	48	17,415
55	February 14	Quebec Nordiques	1–5	Montreal Canadiens	20–27–8	48	16,970
56	February 17	Quebec Nordiques	5–6	Winnipeg Jets	20–28–8	48	12,328
57	February 18	Quebec Nordiques	2–6	Minnesota North Stars	20–29–8	48	8,283
58	February 19	Buffalo Sabres	3–1	Quebec Nordiques	20–30–8	48	10,722
59	February 23	Quebec Nordiques	1–2	Pittsburgh Penguins	20–31–8	48	14,116
60	February 24	Pittsburgh Penguins	0–2	Quebec Nordiques	21–31–8	50	10,227
61	February 26	Hartford Whalers	5–9	Quebec Nordiques	22–31–8	52	10,099
62	February 27	New York Islanders	5–3	Quebec Nordiques	22–32–8	52	10,619

March

Game	Date	Visitor	Score	Home	Record	Points	Attendance
63	March 2	Los Angeles Kings	4–3	Quebec Nordiques	22–33–8	52	10,777
64	March 5	Minnesota North Stars	3-3	Quebec Nordiques	22–33–9	53	10,193
65	March 8	Quebec Nordiques	2–3	Toronto Maple Leafs	22–34–9	53	16,485
66	March 9	Toronto Maple Leafs	4–5	Quebec Nordiques	23–34-9	55	10,241
67	March 12	Edmonton Oilers	6–3	Quebec Nordiques	23–35–9	55	10,619
68	March 16	Vancouver Canucks	3–2	Quebec Nordiques	23–36–9	55	10,699
69	March 19	Quebec Nordiques	2–5	Chicago Black Hawks	23–37–9	55	10,035
70	March 20	Quebec Nordiques	6–2	Colorado Rockies	24–37–9	57	8,732
71	March 22	Quebec Nordiques	1-4	Los Angeles Kings	24–38-9	57	10,635
72	March 23	Quebec Nordiques	6–2	Vancouver Canucks	25–38–9	59	13,620
73	March 26	Chicago Black Hawks	7–2	Quebec Nordiques	25–39–9	59	10,718
74	March 27	Quebec Nordiques	2–5	Philadelphia Flyers	25–40–9	59	17,077
75	March 29	Quebec Nordiques	7–9	Detroit Red Wings	25–41–9	59	16,485
76	March 30	New York Islanders	9–6	Quebec Nordiques	25–42–9	59	10,412

April

Game	Date	Visitor	Score	Home	Record	Points	Attendance
77	April 1	Philadelphia Flyers	3–3	Quebec Nordiques	25–42–10	60	10,706
78	April 3	Quebec Nordiques	3–8	Buffalo Sabres	25–43–10	60	16,433
79	April 4	Quebec Nordiques	2–9	Hartford Whalers	25–44–10	60	14,356
80	April 6	Montreal Canadiens	4–4	Quebec Nordiques	25–44–11	61	11,005

Legend: Win (2 points) Loss (0 points) Tie (1 point)

== Player statistics ==
=== Scoring leaders ===
Player	GP	G	A	Pts	PIM
Réal Cloutier	67	42	47	89	12
Marc Tardif	58	33	35	68	30
Michel Goulet	77	22	32	54	48
Robbie Ftorek	52	18	33	51	28
Rich Leduc	75	21	27	48	49

=== Goaltending ===
Player	GP	Min	W	L	T	GA	SO	GAA
Michel Dion	50	2773	15	25	6	171	2	3.70
Ron Low	15	828	5	7	2	51	0	3.70
Goran Hogosta	21	1199	5	12	3	83	1	4.15

Note:

Pos = Position;GP = Games played; G = Goals; A = Assists; Pts = Points; PIM = Penalty minutes; +/- = Plus/minus; PPG = Power-play goals; SHG = Short-handed goals; GWG = Game-winning goals
Pos = Position;GP = Games played; Min, TOI = Minutes played; W = Wins; L = Losses; T,T/OT = Ties; OTL = Overtime losses; GA = Goals-against; GAA = Goals-against average; SO = Shutouts; SA = Shots against; SV = Shots saved;SV% = Save percentage;

== Transactions ==
The Nordiques were involved in the following transactions during the 1979–80 season.

=== Trades ===
June 9, 1979	To Chicago Black Hawks 1st round pick in 1980 – Denis Savard	To Quebec Nordiques *Real Cloutier
June 9, 1979	To Montreal Canadiens 3rd round pick in 1980 – John Newberry; 2nd round pick in 1981 – Lars Eriksson	To Quebec Nordiques **Marc Tardif; Richard David
June 13, 1979	To St. Louis Blues Hartland Monahan	To Quebec Nordiques Cash
June 15, 1979	To Washington Capitals Dave Parro	To Quebec Nordiques Nelson Burton
June 28, 1979	To Winnipeg Jets Barry Melrose	To Quebec Nordiques Jamie Hislop; Barry Legge
August 1, 1979	To New York Islanders Richard Brodeur	To Quebec Nordiques Goran Hogosta
December 13, 1979	To Toronto Maple Leafs Dave Farrish; Terry Martin	To Quebec Nordiques Reg Thomas
March 11, 1980	To Edmonton Oilers Ron Low	To Quebec Nordiques Ron Chipperfield
May 26, 1980	To Winnipeg Jets Barry Legge	To Quebec Nordiques Cash

*Black Hawks promised to not make Réal Cloutier one of its priority selections in the 1979 NHL reclaim draft
**Canadiens promised to not take Danny Geoffrion and Alain Cote rather than Marc Tardif and/or Richard David in the 1979 NHL reclaim draft

=== Waivers ===
August 13, 1979	From Minnesota North Stars Greg Tebbutt

=== Free agents ===
Player	Former team
Bernie Saunders	Kalamazoo Wings (IHL)
Robbie Ftorek	Cincinnati Stingers (WHA)
Frantisek Cernik	TJ Vitkovice (Czechoslovakia)
Dave Pichette	Quebec Remparts (QMJHL)
Jacques Richard	Buffalo Sabres
Miroslav Frycer	TJ Vitkovice (Czechoslovakia)

Player	New team
Ken Kuzyk	Minnesota North Stars

=== 1979 NHL expansion draft ===
The Nordiques participated in the 1979 NHL expansion draft, which was held on June 13, 1979.

==== Quebec Nordiques selections ====
#	Player	Drafted from
1.	Dave Farrish (D)	New York Rangers
2.	Gerry Hart (D)	New York Islanders
3.	Ron Low (G)	Detroit Red Wings
4.	Pierre Plante (RW)	New York Rangers
5.	Blair Stewart (F)	Washington Capitals
6.	John Baby (D)	Minnesota North Stars
7.	John Smrke (LW)	St. Louis Blues
8.	Dave Parro (G)	Boston Bruins
9.	Ken Kuzyk (RW)	Minnesota North Stars
10.	Roland Cloutier (C)	Detroit Red Wings
11.	Terry Martin (F)	Buffalo Sabres
12.	Jamie Masters (D)	St. Louis Blues
13.	Hartland Monahan (F)	Los Angeles Kings
14.	Ron Andruff (C)	Colorado Rockies
15.	Alain Cote (LW)	Montreal Canadiens
16.	Lars Zetterstrom (D)	Vancouver Canucks

== Draft picks ==
Quebec's draft picks from the 1979 NHL entry draft which was held at the Queen Elizabeth Hotel in Montreal, on August 9, 1979.

Round	#	Player	Nationality	College/junior/club team (league)
1	20	Michel Goulet	Canada	Birmingham Bulls (WHA)
2	41	Dale Hunter	Canada	Sudbury Wolves (OMJHL)
3	62	Lee Norwood	United States	Oshawa Generals (OMJHL)
4	83	Anton Šťastný	Czechoslovakia	Slovan Bratislava (Czech.)
5	104	Pierre Lacroix	Canada	Trois-Rivières Draveurs (QMJHL)
6	125	Scott McGeown	Canada	Toronto Marlboros (OMJHL)
