= 1979–80 Pittsburgh Penguins season =

NHL team season

1979–80 Pittsburgh Penguins
- Division: 3rd Norris
- Conference: 7th Wales
- 1979–80 record: 30–37–13
- Home record: 20–13–7
- Road record: 10–24–6
- Goals for: 251
- Goals against: 303

Team information
- General manager: Baz Bastien
- Coach: Johnny Wilson
- Captain: Orest Kindrachuk
- Alternate captains: None
- Arena: Pittsburgh Civic Arena

Team leaders
- Goals: Rick Kehoe (30)
- Assists: Greg Malone (32)
- Points: Rick Kehoe (60)
- Penalty minutes: Kim Clackson (166)
- Wins: Greg Millen (18)
- Goals against average: Nick Ricci (3.50)

The 1979–80 Pittsburgh Penguins season was their 13th in the National Hockey League (NHL).

== Regular season ==
The Penguins changed their team colors from two-tone blue to Black and Gold in January. This move was done in part to honor the other two professional teams in Pittsburgh (the Steelers and Pirates) both of whom won their respective championships in 1979. The Boston Bruins initially challenged the change in colors as the new scheme closely matched their own. However, as the original NHL franchise in Pittsburgh, the Pirates, had nearly the same colors from their inception while the Bruins wore brown and yellow sweaters, NHL president John Ziegler Jr. eventually denied the Bruins claim. The new Pittsburgh jerseys were debuted on January 30 against the visiting St. Louis Blues.

=== Division standings ===
Norris Division
| | GP | W | L | T | GF | GA | Pts |
|---|---|---|---|---|---|---|---|
| **Montreal Canadiens** | 80 | 47 | 20 | 13 | 328 | 240 | 107 |
| **Los Angeles Kings** | 80 | 30 | 36 | 14 | 290 | 313 | 74 |
| **Pittsburgh Penguins** | 80 | 30 | 37 | 13 | 251 | 303 | 73 |
| **Hartford Whalers** | 80 | 27 | 34 | 19 | 303 | 312 | 73 |
| Detroit Red Wings | 80 | 26 | 43 | 11 | 268 | 306 | 63 |

Note: GP = Games played, W = Wins, L = Losses, T = Ties, Pts = Points, GF = Goals for, GA = Goals against
Note: Teams that qualified for the playoffs are highlighted in bold.

League standings
| R | | Div | GP | W | L | T | GF | GA | Pts |
|---|---|---|---|---|---|---|---|---|---|
| 1 | **p – Philadelphia Flyers** | PTK | 80 | 48 | 12 | 20 | 327 | 254 | 116 |
| 2 | **y – Buffalo Sabres** | ADM | 80 | 47 | 17 | 16 | 318 | 201 | 110 |
| 3 | **x – Montreal Canadiens** | NRS | 80 | 47 | 20 | 13 | 328 | 240 | 107 |
| 4 | **Boston Bruins** | ADM | 80 | 46 | 21 | 13 | 310 | 234 | 105 |
| 5 | **New York Islanders** | PTK | 80 | 39 | 28 | 13 | 281 | 247 | 91 |
| 6 | **Minnesota North Stars** | ADM | 80 | 36 | 28 | 16 | 311 | 253 | 88 |
| 7 | **x – Chicago Black Hawks** | SMY | 80 | 34 | 27 | 19 | 241 | 250 | 87 |
| 8 | **New York Rangers** | PTK | 80 | 38 | 32 | 10 | 308 | 284 | 86 |
| 9 | **Atlanta Flames** | PTK | 80 | 35 | 32 | 13 | 282 | 269 | 83 |
| 10 | **St. Louis Blues** | SMY | 80 | 34 | 34 | 12 | 266 | 278 | 80 |
| 11 | **Toronto Maple Leafs** | ADM | 80 | 35 | 40 | 5 | 304 | 327 | 75 |
| 12 | **Los Angeles Kings** | NRS | 80 | 30 | 36 | 14 | 290 | 313 | 74 |
| 13 | **Pittsburgh Penguins** | NRS | 80 | 30 | 37 | 13 | 251 | 303 | 73 |
| 14 | **Hartford Whalers** | NRS | 80 | 27 | 34 | 19 | 303 | 312 | 73 |
| 15 | **Vancouver Canucks** | SMY | 80 | 27 | 37 | 16 | 256 | 281 | 70 |
| 16 | **Edmonton Oilers** | SMY | 80 | 28 | 39 | 13 | 301 | 322 | 69 |
| 17 | Washington Capitals | PTK | 80 | 27 | 40 | 13 | 261 | 293 | 67 |
| 18 | Detroit Red Wings | NRS | 80 | 26 | 43 | 11 | 268 | 306 | 63 |
| 19 | Quebec Nordiques | ADM | 80 | 25 | 44 | 11 | 248 | 313 | 61 |
| 20 | Winnipeg Jets | SMY | 80 | 20 | 49 | 11 | 214 | 314 | 51 |
| 21 | Colorado Rockies | SMY | 80 | 19 | 48 | 13 | 234 | 308 | 51 |

Divisions: ADM – Adams, NRS – Norris, PTK – Patrick, SMY – Smythe

bold – The top 16 teams in the league qualified for the playoffs, regardless of division or conference.
x – Won division; y – Won Conference (and division); p – Won Presidents' Trophy (and conference and division)

=== Record vs. opponents ===
Norris Division record vs. opponents

==== Vs. Wales Conference ====
**Vs. Norris Division**

1979–80 NHL records
| Team | **DET** | **HFD** | **LAK** | **MTL** | **PIT** | **Total** |
|---|---|---|---|---|---|---|
| Detroit | — | 1–2–1 | 0–3–1 | 0–3–1 | 2–2 | **3–10–3** |
| Hartford | 2–1–1 | — | 2–1–1 | 0–1–3 | 2–1–1 | **6–4–6** |
| Los Angeles | 3–0–1 | 1–2–1 | — | 0–4 | 1–1–2 | **5–7–4** |
| Montreal | 3–0–1 | 1–0–3 | 4–0 | — | 2–1–1 | **10–1–5** |
| Pittsburgh | 2–2 | 1–2–1 | 1–1–2 | 1–2–1 | — | **5–7–4** |

**Vs. Adams Division**

1979–80 NHL records
| Team | **BOS** | **BUF** | **MIN** | **QUE** | **TOR** | **Total** |
|---|---|---|---|---|---|---|
| Detroit | 1–2–1 | 1–3 | 2–1–1 | 2–1–1 | 0–4 | **6–11–3** |
| Hartford | 1–2–1 | 1–3 | 0–4 | 1–1–2 | 2–2 | **5–12–3** |
| Los Angeles | 1–2–1 | 0–3–1 | 2–0–2 | 3–1 | 3–0–1 | **9–6–5** |
| Montreal | 3–1 | 1–1–2 | 3–1 | 2–1–1 | 3–1 | **12–5–3** |
| Pittsburgh | 2–2 | 0–4 | 1–3 | 2–2 | 2–2 | **7–13–0** |

==== Vs. Campbell Conference ====
**Vs. Patrick Division**

1979–80 NHL records
| Team | **ATL** | **NYI** | **NYR** | **PHI** | **WSH** | **Total** |
|---|---|---|---|---|---|---|
| Detroit | 1–2–1 | 3–1 | 1–3 | 0–3–1 | 2–1–1 | **7–10–3** |
| Hartford | 3–1 | 1–3 | 1–2–1 | 0–2–2 | 1–2–1 | **6–10–4** |
| Los Angeles | 1–2–1 | 1–2–1 | 1–3 | 0–4 | 1–3 | **4–14–2** |
| Montreal | 3–0–1 | 0–3–1 | 3–0–1 | 2–1–1 | 2–1–1 | **10–5–5** |
| Pittsburgh | 2–1–1 | 1–0–3 | 2–2 | 0–3–1 | 3–1 | **8–7–5** |

**Vs. Smythe Division**

1979–80 NHL records
| Team | **CHI** | **COL** | **EDM** | **STL** | **VAN** | **WIN** | **Total** |
|---|---|---|---|---|---|---|---|
| Detroit | 1−3 | 1−3 | 2−1–1 | 1−2−1 | 2−2 | 3−1 | **10−12−2** |
| Hartford | 1–1–2 | 2−1−1 | 2–1–1 | 2–2 | 1−1−2 | 2−2 | **10−8−6** |
| Los Angeles | 3−0−1 | 4−0 | 1−2−1 | 1−3 | 2−2 | 1−2−1 | **12−9−3** |
| Montreal | 2−2 | 3−1 | 3−1 | 2−2 | 2−2 | 3−1 | **15−9−0** |
| Pittsburgh | 0−2–2 | 2−2 | 1−3 | 1−2–1 | 2−1–1 | 4−0 | **10−10−4** |

== Schedule and results ==
1979–80 regular season
October: 4–4–1 (home: 3–1–1; road: 1–3–0), 9 points

| # | Date | Visitor | Score | Home | Location (Attendance) | Record | Points |
|---|---|---|---|---|---|---|---|
| 1 | Oct 10 | Winnipeg Jets | 2–4 | Pittsburgh Penguins | Civic Arena (8,752) | 1–0–0 | 2 |
| 2 | Oct 13 | Hartford Whalers | 3–3 | Pittsburgh Penguins | Civic Arena (8,623) | 1–0–1 | 3 |
| 3 | Oct 14 | Pittsburgh Penguins | 4–1 | Boston Bruins | Boston Garden (9,494) | 2–0–1 | 5 |
| 4 | Oct 17 | Los Angeles Kings | 5–4 | Pittsburgh Penguins | Civic Arena (4,815) | 2–1–1 | 5 |
| 5 | Oct 20 | Washington Capitals | 1–5 | Pittsburgh Penguins | Civic Arena (7,629) | 3–1–1 | 7 |
| 6 | Oct 21 | Pittsburgh Penguins | 3–6 | New York Rangers | Madison Square Garden (IV) (17,425) | 3–2–1 | 7 |
| 7 | Oct 24 | Pittsburgh Penguins | 3–7 | Buffalo Sabres | Buffalo Memorial Auditorium (16,433) | 3–3–1 | 7 |
| 8 | Oct 25 | Pittsburgh Penguins | 5–8 | Montreal Canadiens | Montreal Forum (15,969) | 3–4–1 | 7 |
| 9 | Oct 31 | Colorado Rockies | 2–4 | Pittsburgh Penguins | Civic Arena (4,173) | 4–4–1 | 9 |

November: 5–4–3 (home: 3–1–2; road: 2–3–1), 13 points

| # | Date | Visitor | Score | Home | Location (Attendance) | Record | Points |
|---|---|---|---|---|---|---|---|
| 10 | Nov 3 | Atlanta Flames | 3–3 | Pittsburgh Penguins | Civic Arena (8,543) | 4–4–2 | 10 |
| 11 | Nov 7 | Montreal Canadiens | 3–3 | Pittsburgh Penguins | Civic Arena (9,064) | 4–4–3 | 11 |
| 12 | Nov 10 | Boston Bruins | 6–1 | Pittsburgh Penguins | Civic Arena (12,208) | 4–5–3 | 11 |
| 13 | Nov 11 | Pittsburgh Penguins | 4–1 | New York Rangers | Madison Square Garden (IV) (17,419) | 5–5–3 | 13 |
| 14 | Nov 15 | Pittsburgh Penguins | 3–3 | Los Angeles Kings | The Forum (7,698) | 5–5–4 | 14 |
| 15 | Nov 16 | Pittsburgh Penguins | 2–5 | Vancouver Canucks | Pacific Coliseum (15,127) | 5–6–4 | 14 |
| 16 | Nov 18 | Pittsburgh Penguins | 3–2 | Winnipeg Jets | Winnipeg Arena (12,668) | 6–6–4 | 16 |
| 17 | Nov 21 | St. Louis Blues | 2–5 | Pittsburgh Penguins | Civic Arena (11,547) | 7–6–4 | 18 |
| 18 | Nov 23 | Pittsburgh Penguins | 1–4 | Atlanta Flames | Omni Coliseum (13,081) | 7–7–4 | 18 |
| 19 | Nov 24 | New York Rangers | 3–5 | Pittsburgh Penguins | Civic Arena (11,629) | 8–7–4 | 20 |
| 20 | Nov 28 | Quebec Nordiques | 2–7 | Pittsburgh Penguins | Civic Arena (8,396) | 9–7–4 | 22 |
| 21 | Nov 30 | Pittsburgh Penguins | 5–7 | Hartford Whalers | Springfield Civic Center (7,627) | 9–8–4 | 22 |

December: 5–3–7 (home: 3–1–3; road: 2–2–4), 17 points

| # | Date | Visitor | Score | Home | Location (Attendance) | Record | Points |
|---|---|---|---|---|---|---|---|
| 22 | Dec 1 | Colorado Rockies | 4–5 | Pittsburgh Penguins | Civic Arena (12,051) | 10–8–4 | 24 |
| 23 | Dec 5 | Vancouver Canucks | 3–3 | Pittsburgh Penguins | Civic Arena (7,511) | 10–8–5 | 25 |
| 24 | Dec 7 | Pittsburgh Penguins | 5–3 | Washington Capitals | Capital Centre (7,652) | 11–8–5 | 27 |
| 25 | Dec 8 | Chicago Black Hawks | 3–3 | Pittsburgh Penguins | Civic Arena (10,284) | 11–8–6 | 28 |
| 26 | Dec 11 | Pittsburgh Penguins | 3–3 | St. Louis Blues | The Checkerdome (8,605) | 11–8–7 | 29 |
| 27 | Dec 12 | New York Islanders | 3–3 | Pittsburgh Penguins | Civic Arena (8,036) | 11–8–8 | 30 |
| 28 | Dec 15 | Pittsburgh Penguins | 3–3 | New York Islanders | Nassau Veterans Memorial Coliseum (14,995) | 11–8–9 | 31 |
| 29 | Dec 16 | Pittsburgh Penguins | 1–4 | Quebec Nordiques | Quebec Coliseum (10,279) | 11–9–9 | 31 |
| 30 | Dec 19 | Pittsburgh Penguins | 0–0 | Chicago Black Hawks | Chicago Stadium (8,215) | 11–9–10 | 32 |
| 31 | Dec 20 | Pittsburgh Penguins | 1–1 | Philadelphia Flyers | The Spectrum (17,077) | 11–9–11 | 33 |
| 32 | Dec 22 | New York Rangers | 4–3 | Pittsburgh Penguins | Civic Arena (11,587) | 11–10–11 | 33 |
| 33 | Dec 26 | Detroit Red Wings | 4–6 | Pittsburgh Penguins | Civic Arena (11,243) | 12–10–11 | 35 |
| 34 | Dec 28 | Pittsburgh Penguins | 4–2 | Atlanta Flames | Omni Coliseum (9,133) | 13–10–11 | 37 |
| 35 | Dec 29 | Atlanta Flames | 2–3 | Pittsburgh Penguins | Civic Arena (10,416) | 14–10–11 | 39 |
| 36 | Dec 31 | Pittsburgh Penguins | 2–4 | Minnesota North Stars | Met Center (11,475) | 14–11–11 | 39 |

January: 5–10–0 (home: 3–5–0; road: 2–5–0), 10 points

| # | Date | Visitor | Score | Home | Location (Attendance) | Record | Points |
|---|---|---|---|---|---|---|---|
| 37 | Jan 2 | Montreal Canadiens | 3–5 | Pittsburgh Penguins | Civic Arena (13,309) | 15–11–11 | 41 |
| 38 | Jan 3 | Pittsburgh Penguins | 4–3 | New York Islanders | Nassau Veterans Memorial Coliseum (14,580) | 16–11–11 | 43 |
| 39 | Jan 5 | Buffalo Sabres | 5–4 | Pittsburgh Penguins | Civic Arena (15,583) | 16–12–11 | 43 |
| 40 | Jan 7 | Pittsburgh Penguins | 5–9 | Toronto Maple Leafs | Maple Leaf Gardens (16,485) | 16–13–11 | 43 |
| 41 | Jan 9 | Vancouver Canucks | 2–4 | Pittsburgh Penguins | Civic Arena (8,784) | 17–13–11 | 45 |
| 42 | Jan 12 | Chicago Black Hawks | 3–2 | Pittsburgh Penguins | Civic Arena (13,825) | 17–14–11 | 45 |
| 43 | Jan 16 | Toronto Maple Leafs | 4–6 | Pittsburgh Penguins | Civic Arena (9,002) | 18–14–11 | 47 |
| 44 | Jan 17 | Pittsburgh Penguins | 1–7 | Hartford Whalers | Springfield Civic Center (7,627) | 18–15–11 | 47 |
| 45 | Jan 19 | Edmonton Oilers | 5–2 | Pittsburgh Penguins | Civic Arena (12,896) | 18–16–11 | 47 |
| 46 | Jan 23 | Pittsburgh Penguins | 3–4 | Edmonton Oilers | Northlands Coliseum (15,423) | 18–17–11 | 47 |
| 47 | Jan 24 | Pittsburgh Penguins | 1–4 | Colorado Rockies | McNichols Sports Arena (7,615) | 18–18–11 | 47 |
| 48 | Jan 26 | Boston Bruins | 6–4 | Pittsburgh Penguins | Civic Arena (16,033) | 18–19–11 | 47 |
| 49 | Jan 27 | Pittsburgh Penguins | 5–3 | Boston Bruins | Boston Garden (13,131) | 19–19–11 | 49 |
| 50 | Jan 30 | St. Louis Blues | 4–3 | Pittsburgh Penguins | Civic Arena (12,345) | 19–20–11 | 49 |
| 51 | Jan 31 | Pittsburgh Penguins | 3–4 | Detroit Red Wings | Joe Louis Arena (14,432) | 19–21–11 | 49 |

February: 4–7–0 (home: 3–2–0; road: 1–5–0), 8 points

| # | Date | Visitor | Score | Home | Location (Attendance) | Record | Points |
|---|---|---|---|---|---|---|---|
| 52 | Feb 2 | Philadelphia Flyers | 4–0 | Pittsburgh Penguins | Civic Arena (16,033) | 19–22–11 | 49 |
| 53 | Feb 7 | Pittsburgh Penguins | 0–9 | Buffalo Sabres | Buffalo Memorial Auditorium (16,433) | 19–23–11 | 49 |
| 54 | Feb 9 | Minnesota North Stars | 5–2 | Pittsburgh Penguins | Civic Arena (13,011) | 19–24–11 | 49 |
| 55 | Feb 10 | Pittsburgh Penguins | 2–3 | Chicago Black Hawks | Chicago Stadium (12,272) | 19–25–11 | 49 |
| 56 | Feb 13 | Pittsburgh Penguins | 4–2 | Toronto Maple Leafs | Maple Leaf Gardens (16,485) | 20–25–11 | 51 |
| 57 | Feb 16 | Pittsburgh Penguins | 1–8 | Montreal Canadiens | Montreal Forum (17,075) | 20–26–11 | 51 |
| 58 | Feb 17 | Pittsburgh Penguins | 5–6 | Philadelphia Flyers | The Spectrum (17,077) | 20–27–11 | 51 |
| 59 | Feb 20 | Detroit Red Wings | 5–7 | Pittsburgh Penguins | Civic Arena (8,077) | 21–27–11 | 53 |
| 60 | Feb 23 | Quebec Nordiques | 1–2 | Pittsburgh Penguins | Civic Arena (14,116) | 22–27–11 | 55 |
| 61 | Feb 24 | Pittsburgh Penguins | 0–2 | Quebec Nordiques | Quebec Coliseum (10,227) | 22–28–11 | 55 |
| 62 | Feb 27 | Winnipeg Jets | 2–3 | Pittsburgh Penguins | Civic Arena (8,977) | 23–28–11 | 57 |

March: 6–7–2 (home: 4–2–1; road: 2–5–1), 14 points

| # | Date | Visitor | Score | Home | Location (Attendance) | Record | Points |
|---|---|---|---|---|---|---|---|
| 63 | Mar 2 | New York Islanders | 0–0 | Pittsburgh Penguins | Civic Arena (14,879) | 23–28–12 | 58 |
| 64 | Mar 3 | Pittsburgh Penguins | 1–5 | St. Louis Blues | The Checkerdome (12,752) | 23–29–12 | 58 |
| 65 | Mar 5 | Toronto Maple Leafs | 5–3 | Pittsburgh Penguins | Civic Arena (8,925) | 23–30–12 | 58 |
| 66 | Mar 8 | Edmonton Oilers | 4–5 | Pittsburgh Penguins | Civic Arena (10,660) | 24–30–12 | 60 |
| 67 | Mar 9 | Pittsburgh Penguins | 2–6 | Detroit Red Wings | Joe Louis Arena (12,819) | 24–31–12 | 60 |
| 68 | Mar 11 | Philadelphia Flyers | 4–3 | Pittsburgh Penguins | Civic Arena (9,972) | 24–32–12 | 60 |
| 69 | Mar 12 | Los Angeles Kings | 2–4 | Pittsburgh Penguins | Civic Arena (9,294) | 25–32–12 | 62 |
| 70 | Mar 15 | Minnesota North Stars | 2–5 | Pittsburgh Penguins | Civic Arena (10,426) | 26–32–12 | 64 |
| 71 | Mar 18 | Pittsburgh Penguins | 3–4 | Minnesota North Stars | Met Center (10,797) | 26–33–12 | 64 |
| 72 | Mar 21 | Pittsburgh Penguins | 2–9 | Edmonton Oilers | Northlands Coliseum (15,423) | 26–34–12 | 64 |
| 73 | Mar 23 | Pittsburgh Penguins | 4–2 | Winnipeg Jets | Winnipeg Arena (12,377) | 27–34–12 | 66 |
| 74 | Mar 25 | Pittsburgh Penguins | 4–2 | Vancouver Canucks | Pacific Coliseum (12,998) | 28–34–12 | 68 |
| 75 | Mar 27 | Pittsburgh Penguins | 2–2 | Los Angeles Kings | The Forum (9,781) | 28–34–13 | 69 |
| 76 | Mar 28 | Pittsburgh Penguins | 0–5 | Colorado Rockies | McNichols Sports Arena (11,610) | 28–35–13 | 69 |
| 77 | Mar 30 | Washington Capitals | 0–4 | Pittsburgh Penguins | Civic Arena (9,638) | 29–35–13 | 71 |

April: 1–2–0 (home: 1–1–0; road: 0–1–0), 2 points

| # | Date | Visitor | Score | Home | Location (Attendance) | Record | Points |
|---|---|---|---|---|---|---|---|
| 78 | Apr 1 | Pittsburgh Penguins | 2–6 | Washington Capitals | Capital Centre (15,821) | 29–36–13 | 71 |
| 79 | Apr 2 | Hartford Whalers | 4–6 | Pittsburgh Penguins | Civic Arena (11,491) | 30–36–13 | 73 |
| 80 | Apr 5 | Buffalo Sabres | 9–1 | Pittsburgh Penguins | Civic Arena (12,397) | 30–37–13 | 73 |

Legend: Win (2 points) Loss (0 points) Tie (1 point)

== Playoffs ==
=== Preliminary round vs. Boston ===
| April 8 | Pittsburgh Penguins | 4–2 | Boston Bruins | Boston Garden | Recap |
| No Scoring | | First period | No Scoring |
| Mark Johnson (1) – pp – 08:25; Gary McAdam (1) – 14:47 | | Second period | No Scoring |
| Mark Johnson (2) – 03:10; Gregg Sheppard (1) – en – 19:24 | | Third period | 13:44 – pp – Terry O'Reilly (1); 18:47 – Craig MacTavish (1) |
| Greg Millen 36 saves / 38 shots | | Goalie stats | Gerry Cheevers 18 saves / 22 shots |

| April 10 | Pittsburgh Penguins | 1–4 | Boston Bruins | Boston Garden | Recap |
| No Scoring | | First period | No Scoring |
| No Scoring | | Second period | 01:42 – Rick Middleton (1); 10:38 – Don Marcotte (1); 11:41 – Brad Park (1) |
| Rod Schutt (1) – 12:16 | | Third period | 11:15 – Wayne Cashman (1) |
| Greg Millen 38 saves / 42 shots | | Goalie stats | Gerry Cheevers 16 saves / 17 shots |

| April 12 | Boston Bruins | 1–4 | Pittsburgh Penguins | Civic Arena | Recap |
| No Scoring | | First period | 13:28 – Ross Lonsberry (1) |
| No Scoring | | Second period | 01:17 – Ross Lonsberry (2); 16:37 – Randy Carlyle (1) |
| Rick Middleton (2) – 03:48 | | Third period | 13:51 – Rod Schutt (2) |
| Gerry Cheevers 24 saves / 28 shots | | Goalie stats | Greg Millen 19 saves / 20 shots |

| April 13 | Boston Bruins | 8–3 | Pittsburgh Penguins | Civic Arena | Recap |
| Peter McNab (1) – 05:13; Rick Middleton (3) – 06:42; Ray Bourque (1) – 13:26; Peter McNab (2) – pp – 16:00; Craig MacTavish (2) – 18:09 | | First period | No Scoring |
| Bob Miller (1) – sh – 06:31; Dwight Foster (1) – sh – 10:08 | | Second period | No Scoring |
| Dwight Foster 2 – 16:45 | | Third period | 06:43 – pp – Rick Kehoe (1); 14:40 – pp – Ron Stackhouse (1); 14:47 – pp – Rick Kehoe (2) |
| Gerry Cheevers 23 saves / 26 shots | | Goalie stats | Greg Millen 21 saves / 29 shots |

| April 14 | Pittsburgh Penguins | 2–6 | Boston Bruins | Boston Garden | Recap |
| No Scoring | | First period | 03:49 – Peter McNab (3); 04:57 – Bob Miller (2) |
| No Scoring | | Second period | 05:22 – Dwight Foster (3); 10:20 – pp – Wayne Cashman (2) |
| Bob Stewart (1) – 03:18; Nick Libett (1) – pp – 16:10 | | Third period | 06:25 – pp – Terry O'Reilly (2); 14:22 – Brad Park (2) |
| Greg Millen 24 saves / 30 shots | | Goalie stats | Gerry Cheevers 22 saves / 24 shots |

| Boston won series 3–2 |

== Player statistics ==
Skaters

Regular season
| Player | GP | G | A | Pts | +/− | PIM |
|---|---|---|---|---|---|---|
| Rick Kehoe | 79 | 30 | 30 | 60 | –3 | 4 |
| Greg Malone | 51 | 19 | 32 | 51 | 4 | 46 |
| George Ferguson | 73 | 21 | 28 | 49 | 0 | 36 |
| Orest Kindrachuk | 52 | 17 | 29 | 46 | 4 | 63 |
| Peter Lee | 74 | 16 | 29 | 45 | –13 | 20 |
| Gary McAdam | 78 | 19 | 22 | 41 | –17 | 63 |
| Rod Schutt | 73 | 18 | 21 | 39 | –8 | 43 |
| Gregg Sheppard | 76 | 13 | 24 | 37 | –22 | 20 |
| Randy Carlyle | 67 | 8 | 28 | 36 | –23 | 45 |
| Ross Lonsberry | 76 | 15 | 18 | 33 | –4 | 36 |
| Ron Stackhouse | 78 | 6 | 27 | 33 | 16 | 36 |
| Pat Hughes | 76 | 18 | 14 | 32 | –38 | 78 |
| Russ Anderson | 76 | 5 | 22 | 27 | 11 | 150 |
| Nick Libett | 78 | 14 | 12 | 26 | –19 | 14 |
| Paul Marshall | 46 | 9 | 12 | 21 | –2 | 9 |
| Mario Faubert | 49 | 5 | 13 | 18 | –19 | 31 |
| Dale Tallon | 32 | 5 | 9 | 14 | –4 | 18 |
| Kim Davis | 24 | 3 | 7 | 10 | –7 | 43 |
| Bob Stewart^{†} | 65 | 3 | 7 | 10 | –27 | 52 |
| Tom Bladon | 57 | 2 | 6 | 8 | –25 | 35 |
| Mark Johnson | 17 | 3 | 5 | 8 | –4 | 4 |
| Kim Clackson | 45 | 0 | 3 | 3 | –8 | 166 |
| Jim Hamilton | 10 | 2 | 0 | 2 | –6 | 0 |
| Blair Chapman^{‡} | 1 | 0 | 0 | 0 | 0 | 0 |
| Total | | 251 | 398 | 649 | – | 1,012 |

Playoffs
| Player | GP | G | A | Pts | +/− | PIM |
|---|---|---|---|---|---|---|
| Rick Kehoe | 5 | 2 | 5 | 7 | 0 | 0 |
| Mark Johnson | 5 | 2 | 2 | 4 | 0 | 0 |
| Ross Lonsberry | 5 | 2 | 1 | 3 | 0 | 2 |
| George Ferguson | 5 | 0 | 3 | 3 | 0 | 4 |
| Gary McAdam | 5 | 1 | 2 | 3 | 0 | 9 |
| Rod Schutt | 5 | 2 | 1 | 3 | 0 | 6 |
| Bob Stewart | 5 | 1 | 1 | 2 | 0 | 2 |
| Russ Anderson | 5 | 0 | 2 | 2 | 0 | 14 |
| Nick Libett | 5 | 1 | 1 | 2 | 0 | 0 |
| Gregg Sheppard | 5 | 1 | 1 | 2 | 0 | 0 |
| Peter Lee | 4 | 0 | 1 | 1 | 0 | 0 |
| Tom Bladon | 1 | 0 | 1 | 1 | 0 | 0 |
| Ron Stackhouse | 5 | 1 | 0 | 1 | 0 | 18 |
| Mario Faubert | 2 | 0 | 1 | 1 | 0 | 0 |
| Randy Carlyle | 5 | 1 | 0 | 1 | 0 | 4 |
| Dale Tallon | 4 | 0 | 0 | 0 | 0 | 4 |
| Kim Clackson | 3 | 0 | 0 | 0 | 0 | 37 |
| Pat Hughes | 5 | 0 | 0 | 0 | 0 | 21 |
| Kim Davis | 4 | 0 | 0 | 0 | 0 | 0 |
| Paul Marshall | 1 | 0 | 0 | 0 | 0 | 0 |
| Total | | 14 | 22 | 36 | – | 121 |

Goaltenders

Regular Season
| Player | GP | W | L | T | GA | SO |
|---|---|---|---|---|---|---|
| Gregory Millen | 44 | 18 | 18 | 7 | 157 | 2 |
| Robert Holland | 34 | 10 | 17 | 6 | 126 | 1 |
| Nick Ricci | 4 | 2 | 2 | 0 | 14 | 0 |
| Total | | 30 | 37 | 13 | 297 | 3 |

Playoffs
| Player | GP | W | L | T | GA | SO |
|---|---|---|---|---|---|---|
| Gregory Millen | 5 | 2 | 3 | 0 | 21 | 0 |
| Total | | 2 | 3 | 0 | 21 | 0 |

^{†}Denotes player spent time with another team before joining the Penguins. Stats reflect time with the Penguins only.
^{‡}Denotes player was traded mid-season. Stats reflect time with the Penguins only.

== Transactions ==
The Penguins were involved in the following transactions during the 1979–80 season:

=== Trades ===
| August 30, 1979 | To Montreal Canadiens Denis Herron; 1982 2nd round pick (Jocelyn Gauvreau) | To Pittsburgh Penguins Rob Holland; Pat Hughes |
| November 13, 1979 | To St. Louis Blues Blair Chapman | To Pittsburgh Penguins Bob Stewart |

=== Additions and subtractions ===
Additions
| Player | Former team | Via |

Subtractions
| Player | New team | Via |
| Wayne Bianchin | Edmonton Oilers | Expansion Draft (1979-06-13) |
| Colin Campbell | Edmonton Oilers | Expansion Draft (1979-06-13) |
| John Flesch | Colorado Rockies | free agency (1980-01-30) |

== Draft picks ==
The 1979 NHL entry draft was held on August 9, 1979, in Montreal.

| Round | # | Player | Pos | Nationality | College/Junior/Club team (League) |
|---|---|---|---|---|---|
| 2 | 31 | Paul Marshall | Left wing | Canada | Brantford Alexanders (OHA) |
| 3 | 52 | Bennett Wolf | Defense | Canada | Kitchener Rangers (OHA) |
| 4 | 73 | Brian Cross | Defense | Canada | Brantford Alexanders (OHA) |
| 5 | 94 | Nick Ricci | Goaltender | Canada | Niagara Falls Flyers (OHA) |
| 6 | 115 | Marc Chorney | Defense | Canada | U. of North Dakota (NCAA) |
