= 1979–80 New York Islanders season =

NHL hockey team season (won Stanley Cup)

1979–80 New York Islanders
- Stanley Cup champions
- Division: 2nd Patrick
- Conference: 2nd Campbell
- 1979–80 record: 39–28–13
- Home record: 26–9–5
- Road record: 13–19–8
- Goals for: 281
- Goals against: 247

Team information
- General manager: Bill Torrey
- Coach: Al Arbour
- Captain: Denis Potvin
- Alternate captains: None
- Arena: Nassau Coliseum

Team leaders
- Goals: Mike Bossy (51)
- Assists: Bryan Trottier (62)
- Points: Bryan Trottier (104)
- Penalty minutes: Garry Howatt (219)
- Wins: Chico Resch (23)
- Goals against average: Billy Smith (2.95)

The 1979–80 New York Islanders season was the eighth season in the franchise's history. During the season, the Islanders dropped below the 100-point mark for the first time in five years, earning only 91 points.

Before the playoffs, Torrey made the difficult decision to trade longtime and popular veterans Billy Harris and defenseman Dave Lewis to the Los Angeles Kings for second line center Butch Goring. Goring is often called the "final piece of the puzzle": a strong two-way player, his presence on the second line ensured that opponents would no longer be able to focus their defensive efforts on the Isles' first line of Bossy, Trottier and Clark Gillies. Contributions from new teammates, such as wingers Duane Sutter and Anders Kallur and stay-at-home defensemen Gord Lane and Ken Morrow (the latter fresh off a gold medal win at the 1980 Olympics), also figured prominently in the Islanders' playoff success.

== Offseason ==
Clark Gillies resigns the team captaincy and is replaced by defenseman Denis Potvin.

== Regular season ==
=== Season standings ===
Patrick Division
	GP	W	L	T	GF	GA	Pts
**Philadelphia Flyers**	80	48	12	20	327	254	116
**New York Islanders**	80	39	28	13	281	247	91
**New York Rangers**	80	38	32	10	308	284	86
**Atlanta Flames**	80	35	32	13	282	269	83
Washington Capitals	80	27	40	13	261	293	67

Note: GP = Games played, W = Wins, L = Losses, T = Ties, Pts = Points, GF = Goals for, GA = Goals against
Note: Teams that qualified for the playoffs are highlighted in bold.

League standings
R		Div	GP	W	L	T	GF	GA	Pts
1	**p – Philadelphia Flyers**	PTK	80	48	12	20	327	254	116
2	**y – Buffalo Sabres**	ADM	80	47	17	16	318	201	110
3	**x – Montreal Canadiens**	NRS	80	47	20	13	328	240	107
4	**Boston Bruins**	ADM	80	46	21	13	310	234	105
5	**New York Islanders**	PTK	80	39	28	13	281	247	91
6	**Minnesota North Stars**	ADM	80	36	28	16	311	253	88
7	**x – Chicago Black Hawks**	SMY	80	34	27	19	241	250	87
8	**New York Rangers**	PTK	80	38	32	10	308	284	86
9	**Atlanta Flames**	PTK	80	35	32	13	282	269	83
10	**St. Louis Blues**	SMY	80	34	34	12	266	278	80
11	**Toronto Maple Leafs**	ADM	80	35	40	5	304	327	75
12	**Los Angeles Kings**	NRS	80	30	36	14	290	313	74
13	**Pittsburgh Penguins**	NRS	80	30	37	13	251	303	73
14	**Hartford Whalers**	NRS	80	27	34	19	303	312	73
15	**Vancouver Canucks**	SMY	80	27	37	16	256	281	70
16	**Edmonton Oilers**	SMY	80	28	39	13	301	322	69
17	Washington Capitals	PTK	80	27	40	13	261	293	67
18	Detroit Red Wings	NRS	80	26	43	11	268	306	63
19	Quebec Nordiques	ADM	80	25	44	11	248	313	61
20	Winnipeg Jets	SMY	80	20	49	11	214	314	51
21	Colorado Rockies	SMY	80	19	48	13	234	308	51

Divisions: ADM – Adams, NRS – Norris, PTK – Patrick, SMY – Smythe

bold – The top 16 teams in the league qualified for the playoffs, regardless of division or conference.
x – Won division; y – Won Conference (and division); p – Won Presidents' Trophy (and conference and division)

=== Record vs. opponents ===
Patrick Division record vs. opponents

==== Vs. Campbell Conference ====
**Vs. Patrick Division**

1979–80 NHL records
Team	**ATL**	**NYI**	**NYR**	**PHI**	**WSH**	**Total**
Atlanta	—	1–3	3–0–1	2–2	3–0–1	**9−5−2**
N.Y. Islanders	3–1	—	2–2	2–2	2–2	**9−7−0**
N.Y. Rangers	0–3–1	2–2	—	1–2–1	2–2	**5−9−2**
Philadelphia	2–2	2–2	2–1–1	—	2–0–2	**8−5−3**
Washington	0–3–1	2–2	2–2	0–2–2	—	**4−9−3**

**Vs. Smythe Division**

1979–80 NHL records
Team	**CHI**	**COL**	**EDM**	**STL**	**VAN**	**WIN**	**Total**
Atlanta	0−2−2	4−0	2−1−1	3−1	2−2	4−0	**15−6−3**
N.Y. Islanders	2−1−1	3−1	1−2−1	3−1	1−2−1	2−0−2	**12−7−5**
N.Y. Rangers	1−2−1	1−1−2	3−1	4−0	4−0	2−2	**15−6−3**
Philadelphia	2–0–2	2–1–1	3–0−1	2−0−2	3−1	4−0	**16−2−6**
Washington	2−2	1−1−2	1−3	2−2	3−1	3−0−1	**12−9−3**

**Vs. Wales Conference**

**Vs. Adams Division**

1979–80 NHL records
Team	**BOS**	**BUF**	**MIN**	**QUE**	**TOR**	**Total**
Atlanta	0–4	0–3–1	1–1–2	3–0–1	1–3	**5–11–4**
N.Y. Islanders	1–3	1–2–1	0–2–2	4–0	3–1	**9–8–3**
N.Y. Rangers	2–2	1–2–1	1–2–1	2–1–1	2–2	**8–9–3**
Philadelphia	1–1–2	3–0–1	3–1	3–0–1	1–1–2	**11–3–6**
Washington	1–2–1	0–4	0–3–1	1–1–2	1–3	**3–13–4**

**Vs. Norris Division**

1979–80 NHL records
Team	**DET**	**HFD**	**LAK**	**MTL**	**PIT**	**Total**
Atlanta	2–1–1	1–3	2–1–1	0–3–1	1–2–1	**6–10–4**
N.Y. Islanders	1–3	3–1	2–1–1	3–0–1	0–1–3	**9–6–5**
N.Y. Rangers	3–1	2–1–1	3–1	0–3–1	2–2	**10–8–2**
Philadelphia	3–0–1	2–0–2	4–0	1–2–1	3–0–1	**13–2–5**
Washington	1–2–1	2–1–1	3–1	1–2–1	1–3	**8–9–3**

== Playoffs ==
After easily disposing of the Los Angeles Kings and the Boston Bruins in the first two rounds, the Isles faced the Buffalo Sabres in the semi-finals, who had finished second overall in the NHL standings. The Isles won the first two games in Buffalo, including a 3–2 victory in Game 2 on Bob Nystrom's goal in double overtime. They went on to win the series in six games and reach the finals for the first time in franchise history, where they would face the NHL's regular season champions, the Philadelphia Flyers, who had gone undefeated for 35 straight games (25–0–10) during the regular season. In Game 1 in Philadelphia, the Isles won 4–3 on Denis Potvin's power-play goal in overtime. Leading the series 3–2, they went home to Long Island for Game 6. In that game, Bob Nystrom continued his overtime heroics, scoring at 7:11 of the extra frame, on assists by John Tonelli and Lorne Henning, to bring Long Island its first Stanley Cup. It was the Isles' sixth overtime victory of the playoffs. Bryan Trottier won the Conn Smythe Trophy as the most valuable player in the playoffs. Torrey's strategy of building through the draft turned out very well; nearly all of the major contributors on the 1980 champions were home-grown Islanders or had spent most of their NHL careers in the Islanders organization. The Islanders would become the first NHL team to win a Stanley Cup with Europeans (Stefan Persson, Anders Kallur, Bob Nystrom) on its roster.

== Schedule and results ==
=== Regular season ===
1979–80 regular season
October: 4–3–2 (home: 3–1–1; road: 1–2–1)

Game	Date	Score	Opponent	Record	Recap
1	October 11, 1979	2–5	@ Philadelphia Flyers (1979–80)	0–1–0	L
2	October 13, 1979	2–5	Buffalo Sabres (1979–80)	0–2–0	L
3	October 16, 1979	5–1	Atlanta Flames (1979–80)	1–2–0	W
4	October 18, 1979	2–3	@ Boston Bruins (1979–80)	1–3–0	L
5	October 20, 1979	6–1	Hartford Whalers (1979–80)	2–3–0	W
6	October 23, 1979	3–3	Edmonton Oilers (1979–80)	2–3–1	T
7	October 26, 1979	2–1	@ Hartford Whalers (1979–80)	3–3–1	W
8	October 27, 1979	6–4	Chicago Black Hawks (1979–80)	4–3–1	W
9	October 31, 1979	2–2	@ Vancouver Canucks (1979–80)	4–3–2	T

November: 2–8–2 (home: 2–2–0; road: 0–5–2)

Game	Date	Score	Opponent	Record	Recap
10	November 2, 1979	5–7	@ Edmonton Oilers (1979–80)	4–4–2	L
11	November 4, 1979	4–4	@ Winnipeg Jets (1979–80)	4–4–3	T
12	November 6, 1979	4–1	Los Angeles Kings (1979–80)	5–4–3	W
13	November 9, 1979	2–5	@ Atlanta Flames (1979–80)	5–5–3	L
14	November 10, 1979	2–5	Philadelphia Flyers (1979–80)	5–6–3	L
15	November 13, 1979	10–5	New York Rangers (1979–80)	6–6–3	W
16	November 17, 1979	4–5	Detroit Red Wings (1979–80)	6–7–3	L
17	November 20, 1979	3–6	@ St. Louis Blues (1979–80)	6–8–3	L
18	November 21, 1979	1–3	@ Minnesota North Stars (1979–80)	6–9–3	L
19	November 24, 1979	4–4	@ Los Angeles Kings (1979–80)	6–9–4	T
20	November 28, 1979	4–7	@ Colorado Rockies (1979–80)	6–10–4	L
21	November 30, 1979	3–5	@ Edmonton Oilers (1979–80)	6–11–4	L

December: 7–4–2 (home: 4–1–1; road: 3–3–1)

Game	Date	Score	Opponent	Record	Recap
22	December 2, 1979	4–0	@ Winnipeg Jets (1979–80)	7–11–4	W
23	December 4, 1979	1–5	Vancouver Canucks (1979–80)	7–12–4	L
24	December 6, 1979	4–3	Boston Bruins (1979–80)	8–12–4	W
25	December 8, 1979	6–1	@ Toronto Maple Leafs (1979–80)	9–12–4	W
26	December 9, 1979	4–5	@ New York Rangers (1979–80)	9–13–4	L
27	December 11, 1979	4–1	Montreal Canadiens (1979–80)	10–13–4	W
28	December 12, 1979	3–3	@ Pittsburgh Penguins (1979–80)	10–13–5	T
29	December 15, 1979	3–3	Pittsburgh Penguins (1979–80)	10–13–6	T
30	December 18, 1979	3–2	Colorado Rockies (1979–80)	11–13–6	W
31	December 22, 1979	2–1	Washington Capitals (1979–80)	12–13–6	W
32	December 23, 1979	0–8	@ Chicago Black Hawks (1979–80)	12–14–6	L
33	December 27, 1979	7–3	@ Montreal Canadiens (1979–80)	13–14–6	W
34	December 30, 1979	2–4	@ Detroit Red Wings (1979–80)	13–15–6	L

January: 10–4–1 (home: 8–2–1; road: 2–2–0)

Game	Date	Score	Opponent	Record	Recap
35	January 2, 1980	3–1	@ Toronto Maple Leafs (1979–80)	14–15–6	W
36	January 3, 1980	3–4	Pittsburgh Penguins (1979–80)	14–16–6	L
37	January 5, 1980	3–1	St. Louis Blues (1979–80)	15–16–6	W
38	January 8, 1980	3–0	Vancouver Canucks (1979–80)	16–16–6	W
39	January 9, 1980	2–3	@ Buffalo Sabres (1979–80)	16–17–6	L
40	January 12, 1980	5–2	Washington Capitals (1979–80)	17–17–6	W
41	January 15, 1980	5–2	Winnipeg Jets (1979–80)	18–17–6	W
42	January 17, 1980	9–6	Toronto Maple Leafs (1979–80)	19–17–6	W
43	January 19, 1980	3–1	Quebec Nordiques (1979–80)	20–17–6	W
44	January 22, 1980	2–1	Montreal Canadiens (1979–80)	21–17–6	W
45	January 23, 1980	5–3	@ Detroit Red Wings (1979–80)	22–17–6	W
46	January 26, 1980	3–2	Hartford Whalers (1979–80)	23–17–6	W
47	January 27, 1980	1–7	@ Washington Capitals (1979–80)	23–18–6	L
48	January 29, 1980	2–2	Minnesota North Stars (1979–80)	23–18–7	T
49	January 31, 1980	2–4	@ Boston Bruins (1979–80)	23–19–7	L

February: 6–6–1 (home: 3–2–1; road: 3–4–0)

Game	Date	Score	Opponent	Record	Recap
50	February 2, 1980	3–2	Buffalo Sabres (1979–80)	24–19–7	W
51	February 3, 1980	3–5	@ Hartford Whalers (1979–80)	24–20–7	L
52	February 7, 1980	4–1	Los Angeles Kings (1979–80)	25–20–7	W
53	February 9, 1980	5–0	Quebec Nordiques (1979–80)	26–20–7	W
54	February 12, 1980	0–0	Winnipeg Jets (1979–80)	26–20–8	T
55	February 14, 1980	5–3	@ Colorado Rockies (1979–80)	27–20–8	W
56	February 16, 1980	2–3	@ Los Angeles Kings (1979–80)	27–21–8	L
57	February 17, 1980	2–4	@ Vancouver Canucks (1979–80)	27–22–8	L
58	February 19, 1980	4–6	Toronto Maple Leafs (1979–80)	27–23–8	L
59	February 21, 1980	2–5	Minnesota North Stars (1979–80)	27–24–8	L
60	February 23, 1980	3–2	@ St. Louis Blues (1979–80)	28–24–8	W
61	February 24, 1980	2–8	@ New York Rangers (1979–80)	28–25–8	L
62	February 27, 1980	5–3	@ Quebec Nordiques (1979–80)	29–25–8	W

March: 8–3–4 (home: 5–1–1; road: 3–2–3)

Game	Date	Score	Opponent	Record	Recap
63	March 1, 1980	3–4	Detroit Red Wings (1979–80)	29–26–8	L
64	March 2, 1980	0–0	@ Pittsburgh Penguins (1979–80)	29–26–9	T
65	March 4, 1980	6–4	Edmonton Oilers (1979–80)	30–26–9	W
66	March 6, 1980	5–2	@ Philadelphia Flyers (1979–80)	31–26–9	W
67	March 8, 1980	3–5	Boston Bruins (1979–80)	31–27–9	L
68	March 9, 1980	1–3	@ Washington Capitals (1979–80)	31–28–9	L
69	March 11, 1980	4–1	Colorado Rockies (1979–80)	32–28–9	W
70	March 15, 1980	6–2	St. Louis Blues (1979–80)	33–28–9	W
71	March 16, 1980	6–1	@ Chicago Black Hawks (1979–80)	34–28–9	W
72	March 18, 1980	6–3	Atlanta Flames (1979–80)	35–28–9	W
73	March 22, 1980	4–4	Chicago Black Hawks (1979–80)	35–28–10	T
74	March 23, 1980	1–1	@ Buffalo Sabres (1979–80)	35–28–11	T
75	March 25, 1980	5–2	Philadelphia Flyers (1979–80)	36–28–11	W
76	March 28, 1980	2–2	@ Montreal Canadiens (1979–80)	36–28–12	T
77	March 30, 1980	9–6	@ Quebec Nordiques (1979–80)	37–28–12	W

April: 2–0–1 (home: 1–0–0; road: 1–0–1)

Game	Date	Score	Opponent	Record	Recap
78	April 1, 1980	1–1	@ Minnesota North Stars (1979–80)	37–28–13	T
79	April 4, 1980	7–3	@ Atlanta Flames (1979–80)	38–28–13	W
80	April 5, 1980	2–1	New York Rangers (1979–80)	39–28–13	W

Legend: W Win (2 points) L Loss (0 points) T Tie (1 point)

=== Playoffs ===
1980 Stanley Cup playoffs
Preliminary Round vs. (12) Los Angeles Kings – Islanders win 3–1

Game	Date	Opponent	Score	OT	Decision	Attendance	Series	Recap
1	April 8, 1980	Los Angeles Kings (1979–80)	8–1		Smith	13,862	1–0	W
2	April 9, 1980	Los Angeles Kings (1979–80)	3–6		Resch	14,047	1–1	L
3	April 11, 1980	@ Los Angeles Kings (1979–80)	4–3	OT 6:55	Smith	11,690	2–1	W
4	April 12, 1980	@ Los Angeles Kings (1979–80)	6–0		Smith	11,089	3–1	W

Quarterfinals vs. (4) Boston Bruins – Islanders win 4–1

Game	Date	Opponent	Score	OT	Decision	Attendance	Series	Recap
1	April 16, 1980	@ Boston Bruins (1979–80)	2–1	OT 1:02	Smith	10,910	1–0	W
2	April 17, 1980	@ Boston Bruins (1979–80)	5–4	OT 1:24	Smith	13,134	2–0	W
3	April 19, 1980	Boston Bruins (1979–80)	5–3		Smith	14,995	3–0	W
4	April 21, 1980	Boston Bruins (1979–80)	3–4	OT 17:13	Smith	14,995	3–1	L
5	April 22, 1980	@ Boston Bruins (1979–80)	4–2		Smith	14,673	4–0	W

Semifinals vs. (2) Buffalo Sabres – Islanders win 4–2

Game	Date	Opponent	Score	OT	Decision	Attendance	Series	Recap
1	April 29, 1980	@ Buffalo Sabres (1979–80)	4–1		Smith	16,433	1–0	W
2	May 1, 1980	@ Buffalo Sabres (1979–80)	2–1	2OT 21:20	Smith	16,433	2–0	W
3	May 3, 1980	Buffalo Sabres (1979–80)	7–4		Smith	14,995	3–0	W
4	May 6, 1980	Buffalo Sabres (1979–80)	4–7		Smith	14,995	3–1	L
5	May 8, 1980	@ Buffalo Sabres (1979–80)	0–2		Resch	16,433	3–2	L
6	May 10, 1980	Buffalo Sabres (1979–80)	5–2		Smith	14,995	4–2	W

Stanley Cup Finals vs. (1) Philadelphia Flyers – Islanders win 4–2

Game	Date	Opponent	Score	OT	Decision	Attendance	Series	Recap
1	May 13, 1980	@ Philadelphia Flyers (1979–80)	4–3	OT 4:07	Smith	17,077	1–0	W
2	May 15, 1980	@ Philadelphia Flyers (1979–80)	3–8		Smith	17,077	1–1	L
3	May 17, 1980	Philadelphia Flyers (1979–80)	6–2		Smith	14,995	2–1	W
4	May 19, 1980	Philadelphia Flyers (1979–80)	5–2		Smith	14,995	3–1	W
5	May 22, 1980	@ Philadelphia Flyers (1979–80)	3–6		Smith	17,077	3–2	L
6	May 24, 1980	Philadelphia Flyers (1979–80)	5–4	OT 7:11	Smith	14,995	4–2	W

Legend: W Win L Loss

== Player statistics ==
Regular season
Scoring

Player	Pos	GP	G	A	Pts	PIM	+/-	PPG	SHG	GWG
Bryan Trottier	C	78	42	62	104	68	31	15	0	6
Mike Bossy	RW	75	51	41	92	12	28	16	0	8
Clark Gillies	LW	73	19	35	54	49	29	7	0	5
Anders Kallur	RW	76	22	30	52	16	12	5	4	2
John Tonelli	LW	77	14	30	44	49	8	3	0	2
Denis Potvin	D	31	8	33	41	44	13	4	0	0
Bob Bourne	C	73	15	25	40	52	5	3	0	1
Bob Nystrom	RW	67	21	18	39	94	4	2	0	4
Stefan Persson	D	73	4	35	39	76	13	2	0	0
Wayne Merrick	C	70	13	22	35	16	12	2	0	4
Billy Harris	RW	67	15	15	30	37	0	2	1	2
Duane Sutter	RW	56	15	9	24	55	5	0	0	1
Dave Lewis	D	62	5	16	21	54	10	0	0	0
Garry Howatt	LW	77	8	11	19	219	-3	0	0	1
Bob Lorimer	D	74	3	16	19	53	32	0	0	1
Dave Langevin	D	76	3	13	16	109	11	0	1	0
Gord Lane	D	55	2	14	16	152	10	0	0	1
Jean Potvin	D	32	2	13	15	26	-12	2	0	0
Steve Tambellini	C	45	5	8	13	4	-1	0	0	0
Butch Goring	C	12	6	5	11	2	7	0	1	0
Lorne Henning	C	39	3	6	9	6	-10	0	0	0
Mike Kaszycki	C	16	1	4	5	15	3	0	0	0
Yvon Vautour	RW	17	3	1	4	24	-6	0	0	1
Ken Morrow	D	18	0	3	3	4	4	0	0	0
Chico Resch	G	45	0	3	3	4	0	0	0	0
Billy Smith	G	38	1	0	1	39	0	0	0	0
Richard Brodeur	G	2	0	0	0	0	0	0	0	0
Mike Hordy	D	9	0	0	0	7	0	0	0	0
Randy Johnston	D	4	0	0	0	4	-2	0	0	0
Garth MacGuigan	C	2	0	0	0	2	1	0	0	0
Alex McKendry	W	2	0	0	0	0	-1	0	0	0

Goaltending

Player	MIN	GP	W	L	T	GA	GAA	SO
Chico Resch	2606	45	23	14	6	132	3.04	3
Billy Smith	2114	38	15	14	7	104	2.95	2
Richard Brodeur	80	2	1	0	0	6	4.50	0
Team:	4800	80	39	28	13	242	3.02	5

Playoffs
Scoring

Player	Pos	GP	G	A	Pts	PIM	PPG	SHG	GWG
Bryan Trottier	C	21	12	17	29	16	4	2	2
Mike Bossy	RW	16	10	13	23	8	6	0	1
Bob Bourne	C	21	10	10	20	10	5	2	1
Butch Goring	C	21	7	12	19	2	1	0	0
Denis Potvin	D	21	6	13	19	24	4	0	1
Bob Nystrom	RW	20	9	9	18	50	0	0	3
John Tonelli	LW	21	7	9	16	18	0	0	0
Clark Gillies	LW	21	6	10	16	63	1	0	2
Stefan Persson	D	21	5	10	15	16	4	0	0
Duane Sutter	RW	21	3	7	10	74	0	0	0
Lorne Henning	C	21	3	4	7	2	0	3	1
Wayne Merrick	C	21	2	4	6	2	0	0	1
Garry Howatt	LW	21	3	1	4	84	0	0	1
Alex McKendry	W	6	2	2	4	0	0	0	0
Gord Lane	D	21	1	3	4	85	0	0	0
Bob Lorimer	D	21	1	3	4	41	0	0	1
Ken Morrow	D	20	1	2	3	12	0	0	1
Dave Langevin	D	21	0	3	3	32	0	0	0
Chico Resch	G	4	0	0	0	0	0	0	0
Billy Smith	G	20	0	0	0	11	0	0	0

Goaltending

Player	MIN	GP	W	L	GA	GAA	SO
Billy Smith	1198	20	15	4	56	2.80	1
Chico Resch	120	4	0	2	9	4.50	0
Team:	1318	21	15	6	65	2.96	1

Note: Pos = Position; GP = Games played; G = Goals; A = Assists; Pts = Points; +/- = plus/minus; PIM = Penalty minutes; PPG = Power-play goals; SHG = Short-handed goals; GWG = Game-winning goals
MIN = Minutes played; W = Wins; L = Losses; T = Ties; GA = Goals-against; GAA = Goals-against average; SO = Shutouts;

== Awards and records ==
- Bryan Trottier, Conn Smythe Trophy

== Draft picks ==
Round	Pick	Player	Nationality	College/Junior/Club team
1	17	Duane Sutter (RW)	Canada	Lethbridge Broncos (WHL)
2	25	Tomas Jonsson (D)	Sweden	Modo Hockey (Sweden)
2	38	Billy Carroll (C)	Canada	London Knights (OMJHL)
3	59	Roland Melanson (G)	Canada	Windsor Spitfires (OMJHL)
4	80	Tim Lockridge (D)	Canada	Brandon Wheat Kings (WHL)
5	101	Glen Duncan (LW)	Canada	Toronto Marlboros (OMJHL)
6	122	John Gibb (D)	Canada	Bowling Green University (CCHA)

Preceded by Montreal Canadiens; 1979	New York Islanders; Stanley Cup Champions; 1980	Succeeded by New York Islanders; 1981
