= Vincent Tremblay =

Canadian ice hockey player

- Born: October 21, 1959 (age 65); Quebec City, Quebec, Canada
- Height: 6 ft 00 in (183 cm)
- Weight: 180 lb (82 kg; 12 st 12 lb)
- Position: Goaltender
- Caught: Left
- Played for: Toronto Maple Leafs; Pittsburgh Penguins
- NHL draft: 72nd overall, 1979; Toronto Maple Leafs
- Playing career: 1979–1985

Vincent Tremblay (born October 21, 1959) is a Canadian former professional ice hockey goaltender who played 58 games in the National Hockey League between 1980 and 1984. He played with the Pittsburgh Penguins and Toronto Maple Leafs.

== Career ==
He was invited to try out for the Canadian 1980 Winter Olympics men's ice hockey team but left to consider a professional contract from the Toronto Maple Leafs.

== Career statistics ==
=== Regular season and playoffs ===
			Regular season									Playoffs
Season	Team	League	GP	W	L	T	MIN	GA	SO	GAA	SV%	GP	W	L	MIN	GA	SO	GAA	SV%
1977–78	Quebec Remparts	QMJHL	50	19	21	4	2664	201	0	4.53	.869	3	0	3	157	18	0	6.88	.835
1978–79	Quebec Remparts	QMJHL	66	24	27	11	3588	273	2	4.56	.878	6	2	4	350	30	0	5.14	.843
1979–80	Toronto Maple Leafs	NHL	10	2	1	0	328	28	0	5.13	.858	—	—	—	—	—	—	—	—
1979–80	New Brunswick Hawks	AHL	13	4	3	0	510	35	0	4.12	—	1	0	1	42	4	0	5.71	—
1980–81	Toronto Maple Leafs	NHL	3	0	3	0	144	16	0	6.69	.833	—	—	—	—	—	—	—	—
1980–81	New Brunswick Hawks	AHL	46	24	12	8	2613	141	2	3.24	.881	—	—	—	—	—	—	—	—
1981–82	Toronto Maple Leafs	NHL	40	10	18	8	2031	153	1	4.52	.871	—	—	—	—	—	—	—	—
1982–83	Toronto Maple Leafs	NHL	1	0	0	0	40	2	0	3.00	.926	—	—	—	—	—	—	—	—
1982–83	St. Catharines Saints	AHL	34	—	—	—	1699	133	0	4.70	—	—	—	—	—	—	—	—	—
1983–84	Pittsburgh Penguins	NHL	4	0	4	0	240	24	0	6.02	.830	—	—	—	—	—	—	—	—
1983–84	Baltimore Skipjacks	AHL	28	10	8	7	1590	106	0	4.00	.870	—	—	—	—	—	—	—	—
1984–85	Rochester Americans	AHL	33	13	10	8	1811	115	0	3.81	.868	3	1	1	121	46	0	5.45	—
NHL totals			58	12	26	8	2781	223	1	4.81	.865	—	—	—	—	—	—	—	—
