= Pat Ribble =

Canadian ice hockey player

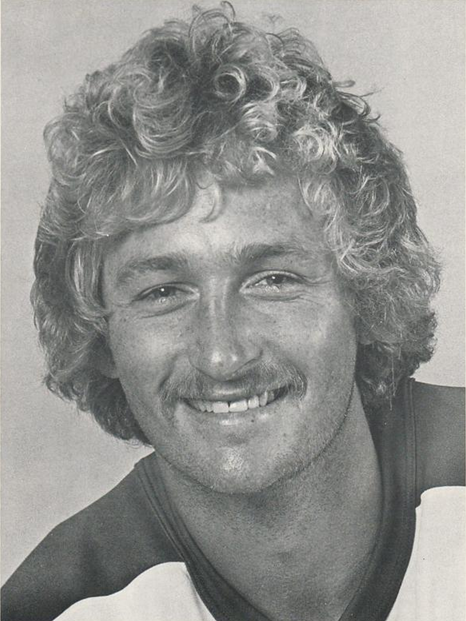
- Ribble in 1980 photo
- Born: April 26, 1954 (age 72) Leamington, Ontario, Canada
- Height: 6 ft 4 in (193 cm)
- Weight: 210 lb (95 kg; 15 st 0 lb)
- Position: Defence
- Played for: Atlanta Flames; Chicago Black Hawks; Toronto Maple Leafs; Washington Capitals; Calgary Flames
- NHL draft: 58th overall, 1974; Atlanta Flames
- WHA draft: 62nd overall, 1974; Indianapolis Racers
- Playing career: 1975–1987
Medal record
Representing Canada
Ice hockey
World Championships
Bronze medal – third place	1978 Prague

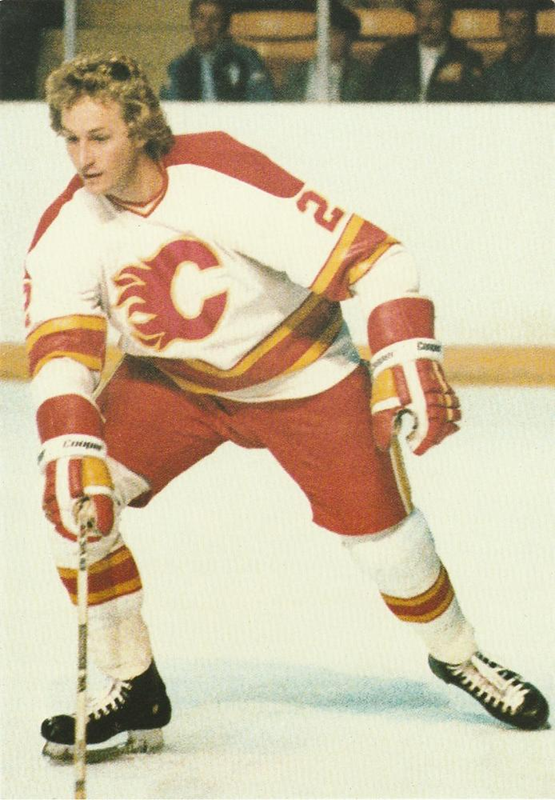
1982 postcard of Ribble in action for Calgary Flames

Patrick Wayne Ribble (born April 26, 1954) is a Canadian former professional ice hockey player who played in the National Hockey League between 1975 and 1983.

A defenceman, Ribble was selected in 1974 by both the Atlanta Flames of the National Hockey League and the Indianapolis Racers of the World Hockey Association. He also played for the Chicago Black Hawks, Toronto Maple Leafs, Washington Capitals, and Calgary Flames. In addition, in 1978 Pat Ribble played at the World Championships with Canada, winning a bronze medal.

== Career statistics ==
=== Regular season and playoffs ===
			Regular season					Playoffs
Season	Team	League	GP	G	A	Pts	PIM	GP	G	A	Pts	PIM
1971–72	Windsor Spitfires	SOJHL	6	0	1	1	12	—	—	—	—	—
1972–73	Oshawa Generals	OHA	61	11	27	38	110	—	—	—	—	—
1973–74	Oshawa Generals	OHA	70	8	16	24	134	—	—	—	—	—
1974–75	Oshawa Generals	OHA	77	5	17	22	164	6	0	1	1	23
1975–76	Atlanta Flames	NHL	3	0	0	0	0	—	—	—	—	—
1975–76	Tulsa Oilers	CHL	73	3	22	25	98	9	0	3	3	10
1976–77	Atlanta Flames	NHL	23	2	2	4	31	2	0	0	0	6
1976–77	Tulsa Oilers	CHL	51	9	20	29	140	—	—	—	—	—
1977–78	Atlanta Flames	NHL	80	5	12	17	68	2	0	1	1	2
1978–79	Atlanta Flames	NHL	66	5	16	21	69	—	—	—	—	—
1978–79	Chicago Black Hawks	NHL	12	1	3	4	8	4	0	0	0	4
1979–80	Chicago Black Hawks	NHL	23	1	2	3	14	—	—	—	—	—
1979–80	Toronto Maple Leafs	NHL	13	0	2	2	8	—	—	—	—	—
1979–80	Washington Capitals	NHL	19	1	5	6	30	—	—	—	—	—
1980–81	Washington Capitals	NHL	67	3	15	18	103	—	—	—	—	—
1981–82	Washington Capitals	NHL	12	1	2	3	14	—	—	—	—	—
1981–82	Calgary Flames	NHL	3	0	0	0	2	—	—	—	—	—
1981–82	Oklahoma City Stars	CHL	43	1	9	10	44	2	0	0	0	6
1982–83	Calgary Flames	NHL	28	0	1	1	18	—	—	—	—	—
1982–83	Colorado Flames	CHL	10	1	4	5	8	—	—	—	—	—
1983–84	Colorado Flames	CHL	53	4	27	31	60	6	0	2	2	4
1984–85	Salt Lake Golden Eagles	IHL	54	4	23	27	50	—	—	—	—	—
1984–85	Indianapolis Checkers	IHL	24	10	14	24	18	7	0	2	2	4
1985–86	Indianapolis Checkers	IHL	52	6	21	27	45	2	0	1	1	2
1986–87	Salt Lake Golden Eagles	IHL	80	9	19	28	55	17	1	5	6	2
NHL totals			349	19	60	79	365	8	0	1	1	12

=== International ===
Year	Team	Event	GP	G	A	Pts	PIM
1978	Canada	WC	10	0	0	0	15
Senior totals			10	0	0	0	15
