= Don Howse =

Canadian ice hockey player

- Born: July 28, 1952 (age 72); Grand Falls-Windsor, Newfoundland, Canada
- Height: 6 ft 0 in (183 cm)
- Weight: 182 lb (83 kg; 13 st 0 lb)
- Position: Left wing
- Shot: Left
- Played for: Los Angeles Kings
- NHL draft: Undrafted
- Playing career: 1971–1989

Donald Gordon Howse (born July 28, 1952) is a Canadian retired professional ice hockey player who played 33 games in the National Hockey League with the Los Angeles Kings during the 1979–80 season. The rest of his career, which lasted from 1971 to 1989, was mainly spent in the minor and senior leagues.

== Career statistics ==
=== Regular season and playoffs ===
| | | | Regular season | | | | | Playoffs |
| Season | Team | League | GP | G | A | Pts | PIM | GP | G | A | Pts | PIM |
|---|---|---|---|---|---|---|---|---|---|---|---|---|
| 1969–70 | Ottawa 67's | OHA | 50 | 3 | 3 | 6 | 4 | — | — | — | — | — |
| 1970–71 | Ottawa 67's | OHA | 58 | 5 | 12 | 17 | 4 | — | — | — | — | — |
| 1971–72 | Grand Falls Cataracts | NFSHL | 27 | 23 | 18 | 41 | 18 | 13 | 10 | 16 | 26 | 9 |
| 1972–73 | Greensboro Generals | EHL | 64 | 35 | 34 | 69 | 39 | 7 | 0 | 2 | 2 | 0 |
| 1973–74 | Nova Scotia Voyageurs | AHL | 40 | 6 | 12 | 18 | 2 | 5 | 0 | 3 | 3 | 9 |
| 1974–75 | Nova Scotia Voyageurs | AHL | 68 | 30 | 43 | 73 | 50 | 6 | 1 | 1 | 2 | 2 |
| 1975–76 | Nova Scotia Voyageurs | AHL | 68 | 24 | 36 | 60 | 34 | 9 | 2 | 5 | 7 | 9 |
| 1976–77 | Nova Scotia Voyageurs | AHL | 58 | 13 | 24 | 37 | 39 | 12 | 2 | 3 | 5 | 8 |
| 1977–78 | Nova Scotia Voyageurs | AHL | 48 | 7 | 22 | 29 | 12 | 11 | 1 | 3 | 4 | 18 |
| 1978–79 | Nova Scotia Voyageurs | AHL | 58 | 19 | 15 | 34 | 65 | 10 | 4 | 3 | 7 | 6 |
| 1979–80 | Los Angeles Kings | NHL | 33 | 2 | 5 | 7 | 6 | 2 | 0 | 0 | 0 | 0 |
| 1979–80 | Binghamton Dusters | AHL | 38 | 12 | 30 | 42 | 32 | — | — | — | — | — |
| 1980–81 | Houston Apollos | CHL | 33 | 5 | 9 | 14 | 27 | — | — | — | — | — |
| 1980–81 | Hershey Bears | AHL | 37 | 9 | 10 | 19 | 22 | 10 | 1 | 4 | 5 | 11 |
| 1981–82 | Stephenvills Monarchs | NFSHL | 28 | 21 | 35 | 56 | 21 | — | 3 | 6 | 9 | — |
| 1982–83 | Stephenville Jets | NFSHL | 32 | 13 | 39 | 52 | 61 | — | 2 | 5 | 7 | — |
| 1983–84 | Stephenville Jets | NFSHL | 37 | 28 | 41 | 69 | 23 | — | 5 | 11 | 16 | — |
| 1984–85 | Stephenville Jets | NFSHL | 36 | 18 | 55 | 73 | 43 | — | 3 | 3 | 6 | — |
| 1985–86 | Stephenville Jets | NFSHL | 27 | 8 | 12 | 20 | 32 | — | — | — | — | — |
| 1986–87 | Stephenville Jets | NFSHL | 35 | 12 | 36 | 48 | 19 | — | 2 | 7 | 9 | — |
| 1987–88 | Stephenville Jets | NFSHL | 18 | 7 | 13 | 20 | 10 | — | 0 | 2 | 2 | — |
| 1988–89 | Port-aux-Basques Mariners | NFSHL | 25 | 7 | 13 | 20 | 6 | — | 7 | 6 | 13 | — |
| AHL totals | | | 415 | 120 | 192 | 312 | 256 | 63 | 11 | 22 | 33 | 63 |
| NFSHL totals | | | 265 | 137 | 262 | 399 | 233 | 13 | 32 | 56 | 88 | 9 |
| NHL totals | | | 33 | 2 | 5 | 7 | 6 | 2 | 0 | 0 | 0 | 0 |
