= Gary McAdam =

Canadian ice hockey player (born 1955)

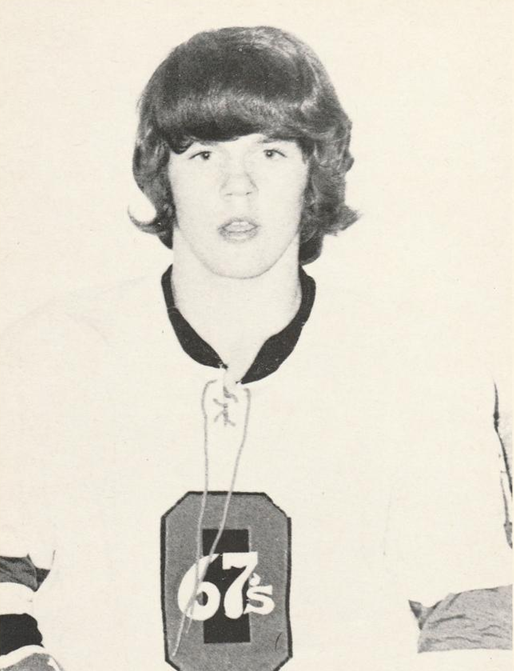
- McAdam in 1972-73 year
- Born: December 31, 1955 (age 70) Smiths Falls, Ontario, Canada
- Height: 5 ft 11 in (180 cm)
- Weight: 175 lb (79 kg; 12 st 7 lb)
- Position: Left wing
- Shot: Left
- Played for: Buffalo Sabres; Pittsburgh Penguins; Detroit Red Wings; Calgary Flames; Washington Capitals; New Jersey Devils; Toronto Maple Leafs
- NHL draft: 53rd overall, 1975; Buffalo Sabres
- Playing career: 1975–1986

Gary F. McAdam (born December 31, 1955) is a Canadian former professional ice hockey player.

== Career ==
Selected by the Buffalo Sabres in the 1975 NHL entry draft, McAdam also played for the Pittsburgh Penguins, Detroit Red Wings, Calgary Flames, Washington Capitals, New Jersey Devils, and Toronto Maple Leafs before retiring following the 1985–86 NHL season.

His finest pro season came in 1982-83 when he scored 40 goals and 29 assists in helping the Rochester Americans of the American Hockey League win the Calder Cup. He netted 11 shorthanded goals that season, an AHL record that still stands.

== Personal ==
He is a resident of Portland, Maine and took over as head coach of the Deering High School hockey team in 1997.

== Career statistics ==
=== Regular season and playoffs ===
			Regular season					Playoffs
Season	Team	League	GP	G	A	Pts	PIM	GP	G	A	Pts	PIM
1972–73	Ottawa 67's	OHA	61	14	8	22	23	—	—	—	—	—
1973–74	St. Catharines Black Hawks	OHA	67	30	37	67	41	—	—	—	—	—
1974–75	St. Catharines Black Hawks	OHA	65	24	53	77	111	—	—	—	—	—
1975–76	Hershey Bears	AHL	24	14	13	27	45	10	3	2	5	9
1975–76	Buffalo Sabres	NHL	31	1	2	3	2	1	0	0	0	0
1976–77	Buffalo Sabres	NHL	73	13	16	29	17	6	1	0	1	0
1977–78	Buffalo Sabres	NHL	79	19	22	41	44	8	2	2	4	7
1978–79	Buffalo Sabres	NHL	40	6	5	11	13	—	—	—	—	—
1978–79	Pittsburgh Penguins	NHL	28	5	9	14	2	7	2	1	3	0
1979–80	Pittsburgh Penguins	NHL	78	19	22	41	63	5	1	2	3	9
1980–81	Pittsburgh Penguins	NHL	34	3	9	12	30	—	—	—	—	—
1980–81	Detroit Red Wings	NHL	40	5	14	19	27	—	—	—	—	—
1981–82	Calgary Flames	NHL	46	12	15	27	18	3	0	0	0	0
1981–82	Dallas Black Hawks	CHL	12	10	10	20	14	—	—	—	—	—
1982–83	Rochester Americans	AHL	73	40	29	69	58	16	3	4	7	4
1982–83	Buffalo Sabres	NHL	4	1	0	1	0	—	—	—	—	—
1983–84	Maine Mariners	AHL	10	3	4	7	18	—	—	—	—	—
1983–84	Washington Capitals	NHL	24	1	5	6	12	—	—	—	—	—
1983–84	New Jersey Devils	NHL	38	9	6	15	15	—	—	—	—	—
1984–85	Maine Mariners	AHL	70	32	20	52	39	10	4	6	10	0
1984–85	New Jersey Devils	NHL	4	1	1	2	0	—	—	—	—	—
1985–86	Toronto Maple Leafs	NHL	15	1	6	7	0	—	—	—	—	—
1985–86	St. Catharines Saints	AHL	27	15	18	33	16	—	—	—	—	—
NHL totals			534	96	132	228	243	30	6	5	11	16

== Transactions ==
- February 6, 1979 – Traded to the Pittsburgh Penguins by the Buffalo Sabres for Dave Schultz.
- January 8, 1981 – Traded to the Detroit Red Wings by the Pittsburgh Penguins for Errol Thompson.
- November 10, 1981 – Traded to the Calgary Flames by the Detroit Red Wings with the Detroit Red Wings' 4th round choice (John Bekkers) in 1983 NHL entry draft for Eric Vail.
- September 17, 1982 – Signed as a free agent by the Buffalo Sabres.
- August 4, 1983 – Signed as a free agent by the New Jersey Devils.
- November 17, 1983 – Claimed on waivers by the Washington Capitals from the New Jersey Devils.
- January 18, 1984 – Rights traded to the New Jersey Devils by the Washington Capitals for cash.
- July 31, 1985 – Signed as a free agent by the Toronto Maple Leafs.
