= Terry Martin (ice hockey) =

Canadian ice hockey player (born 1955)

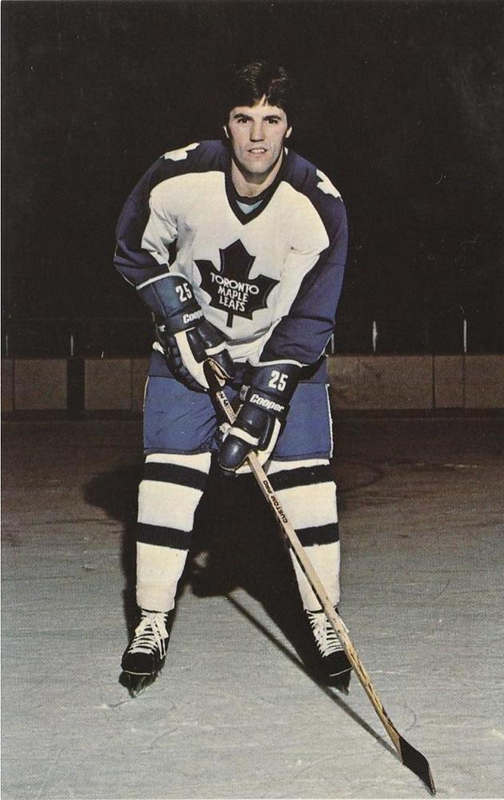
- Born: October 25, 1955 (age 70) Barrie, Ontario, Canada
- Height: 5 ft 11 in (180 cm)
- Weight: 195 lb (88 kg; 13 st 13 lb)
- Position: Left wing
- Shot: Left
- Played for: Buffalo Sabres; Quebec Nordiques; Toronto Maple Leafs; Edmonton Oilers; Minnesota North Stars
- NHL draft: 44th overall, 1975; Buffalo Sabres
- WHA draft: 86th overall, 1975; New England Whalers
- Playing career: 1975–1987

Terry George Martin (born October 25, 1955) is a Canadian former professional ice hockey forward who played in the National Hockey League (NHL) for the Buffalo Sabres, Quebec Nordiques, Toronto Maple Leafs, Edmonton Oilers, and Minnesota North Stars between 1975 and 1985.

== Early life ==
Martin was born in Barrie, Ontario. He played junior hockey with the London Knights from 1972 to 1975.

== Career ==
Martin was drafted in the third round, 44th overall, by the Buffalo Sabres in the 1975 NHL Amateur Draft. He was also drafted by the World Hockey Association's New England Whalers; however, he never played in that league.

In his NHL career, Martin appeared in 479 games. He scored 104 goals and added 101 assists. After his playing career, he worked as an assistant coach for six seasons with the American Hockey League's Rochester Americans and for one season in the NHL with the Sabres. He later worked as a scout in the NHL.

== Career statistics ==
=== Regular season and playoffs ===
			Regular season					Playoffs
Season	Team	League	GP	G	A	Pts	PIM	GP	G	A	Pts	PIM
1972–73	London Knights	OHA	59	17	22	39	25	—	—	—	—	—
1973–74	London Knights	OHA	63	33	24	57	38	—	—	—	—	—
1974–75	London Knights	OMJHL	70	43	56	99	118	—	—	—	—	—
1975–76	Buffalo Sabres	NHL	1	0	0	0	0	—	—	—	—	—
1975–76	Hershey Bears	AHL	19	3	6	9	18	—	—	—	—	—
1975–76	Charlotte Checkers	SHL	25	12	10	22	30	9	2	3	5	2
1976–77	Buffalo Sabres	NHL	62	11	12	33	8	3	0	2	2	5
1976–77	Hershey Bears	AHL	12	1	4	5	12	—	—	—	—	—
1977–78	Buffalo Sabres	NHL	21	3	2	5	9	8	2	0	2	5
1977–78	Hershey Bears	AHL	4	2	1	3	2	—	—	—	—	—
1978–79	Buffalo Sabres	NHL	64	6	8	14	33	—	—	—	—	—
1979–80	Quebec Nordiques	NHL	3	0	0	0	0	—	—	—	—	—
1979–80	Syracuse Firebirds	AHL	18	9	9	18	6	—	—	—	—	—
1979–80	Toronto Maple Leafs	NHL	37	6	15	21	2	3	2	0	2	7
1979–80	New Brunswick Hawks	AHL	3	0	1	1	0	—	—	—	—	—
1980–81	Toronto Maple Leafs	NHL	69	23	14	37	32	3	0	0	0	0
1981–82	Toronto Maple Leafs	NHL	72	25	24	49	39	—	—	—	—	—
1982–83	Toronto Maple Leafs	NHL	76	14	13	27	28	4	0	0	0	9
1983–84	Toronto Maple Leafs	NHL	63	15	10	25	51	—	—	—	—	—
1984–85	Edmonton Oilers	NHL	4	0	2	2	0	—	—	—	—	—
1984–85	Nova Scotia Oilers	AHL	28	17	11	28	4	—	—	—	—	—
1984–85	Minnesota North Stars	NHL	7	1	1	2	0	—	—	—	—	—
1985–86	Springfield Indians	AHL	72	19	22	41	17	—	—	—	—	—
1986–87	Newmarket Saints	AHL	72	8	7	15	8	—	—	—	—	—
NHL totals			479	104	101	205	202	21	4	2	6	26
