= 1979–80 Winnipeg Jets season =

NHL hockey team season (first season in NHL)

1979–80 Winnipeg Jets
- Division: 5th Smythe
- Conference: 10th Campbell
- 1979–80 record: 20–49–11
- Home record: 13–19–8
- Road record: 7–30–3
- Goals for: 214 (21st)
- Goals against: 314 (19th)

Team information
- General manager: John Ferguson
- Coach: Tom McVie; Bill Sutherland
- Captain: Lars-Erik Sjoberg
- Alternate captains: None
- Arena: Winnipeg Arena
- Average attendance: 13,284

Team leaders
- Goals: Morris Lukowich (35)
- Assists: Morris Lukowich (39)
- Points: Morris Lukowich (74)
- Penalty minutes: Jimmy Mann (287)
- Wins: Pierre Hamel (9)
- Goals against average: Markus Mattsson (3.25)

The 1979–80 Winnipeg Jets season was the organization's eighth season since its inception in 1972, and its first season in the National Hockey League (NHL).

== Offseason ==
After spending seven seasons in the World Hockey Association, in which the team won three Avco Cup championships, the Winnipeg Jets joined the National Hockey League, as did the Edmonton Oilers, Hartford Whalers and Quebec Nordiques, as the WHA disbanded.

On June 13, 1979, the Jets participated in the 1979 NHL expansion draft to fill out their roster, while on June 28, 1979, Winnipeg made their first ever trade, as the Jets sent Jamie Hislop to the Quebec Nordiques in exchange for Barry Legge.

On August 8, 1979, the Jets selected Jimmy Mann of the Sherbrooke Castors of the QMJHL with their first ever draft pick at the 1979 NHL entry draft. In the fifth round, the Jets selected Thomas Steen from Leksands IF of the SEL.

During the off-season, the club announced that Tom McVie would be retained as head coach. McVie became the Jets head coach late in the 1978–79 season, going 11-8-0 in nineteen games, followed by a record of 8–2 in the playoffs to lead Winnipeg to the Avco Cup. McVie had head coaching experience in the NHL, as he coached the Washington Capitals to a 49-122-33 record from 1975 to 1978.

Lars-Erik Sjoberg was named captain of the team, as former captain Barry Long joined the Detroit Red Wings for the 1979–80 season. Sjoberg captained Winnipeg from 1975 to 1978 in the WHA.

== Regular season ==
The Jets failed to qualify for the playoffs, as their record of 20-49-11 earned them 51 points, good for fifth in the Smythe Division, 18 points behind the fourth place Edmonton Oilers for the final playoff position.

=== Final standings ===
Smythe Division
	GP	W	L	T	GF	GA	Pts
**Chicago Black Hawks**	80	34	27	19	241	250	87
**St. Louis Blues**	80	34	34	12	266	278	80
**Vancouver Canucks**	80	27	37	16	256	281	70
**Edmonton Oilers**	80	28	39	13	301	322	69
Winnipeg Jets	80	20	49	11	214	314	51
Colorado Rockies	80	19	48	13	234	308	51

Note: GP = Games played, W = Wins, L = Losses, T = Ties, Pts = Points, GF = Goals for, GA = Goals against
Note: Teams that qualified for the playoffs are highlighted in bold.

League standings
R		Div	GP	W	L	T	GF	GA	Pts
1	**p – Philadelphia Flyers**	PTK	80	48	12	20	327	254	116
2	**y – Buffalo Sabres**	ADM	80	47	17	16	318	201	110
3	**x – Montreal Canadiens**	NRS	80	47	20	13	328	240	107
4	**Boston Bruins**	ADM	80	46	21	13	310	234	105
5	**New York Islanders**	PTK	80	39	28	13	281	247	91
6	**Minnesota North Stars**	ADM	80	36	28	16	311	253	88
7	**x – Chicago Black Hawks**	SMY	80	34	27	19	241	250	87
8	**New York Rangers**	PTK	80	38	32	10	308	284	86
9	**Atlanta Flames**	PTK	80	35	32	13	282	269	83
10	**St. Louis Blues**	SMY	80	34	34	12	266	278	80
11	**Toronto Maple Leafs**	ADM	80	35	40	5	304	327	75
12	**Los Angeles Kings**	NRS	80	30	36	14	290	313	74
13	**Pittsburgh Penguins**	NRS	80	30	37	13	251	303	73
14	**Hartford Whalers**	NRS	80	27	34	19	303	312	73
15	**Vancouver Canucks**	SMY	80	27	37	16	256	281	70
16	**Edmonton Oilers**	SMY	80	28	39	13	301	322	69
17	Washington Capitals	PTK	80	27	40	13	261	293	67
18	Detroit Red Wings	NRS	80	26	43	11	268	306	63
19	Quebec Nordiques	ADM	80	25	44	11	248	313	61
20	Winnipeg Jets	SMY	80	20	49	11	214	314	51
21	Colorado Rockies	SMY	80	19	48	13	234	308	51

Divisions: ADM – Adams, NRS – Norris, PTK – Patrick, SMY – Smythe

bold – The top 16 teams in the league qualified for the playoffs, regardless of division or conference.
x – Won division; y – Won Conference (and division); p – Won Presidents' Trophy (and conference and division)

=== Record vs. opponents ===
Smythe Division record vs. opponents

==== Vs. Campbell Conference ====
**Vs. Smythe Division**

1979–80 NHL records
Team	**CHI**	**COL**	**EDM**	**STL**	**VAN**	**WIN**	**Total**
Chicago	—	3−0−1	1−3	1−2−1	1−1−2	2−2	8−8−4
Colorado	0−3−1	—	2−2	0−2−2	1−2−1	1−2−1	4−11−5
Edmonton	3−1	2−2	—	0−3−1	1−2−1	1−2−1	7−10−3
St. Louis	2−1−1	2−0−2	3−0−1	—	3−1	1−1−2	11−3−6
Vancouver	1−1−2	2−1−1	2−1−1	1−3	—	2−1−1	8−7−5
Winnipeg	2−2	2−1−1	1−2−1	2−2	1−2−1	—	8−9−3

**Vs. Patrick Division**

1979–80 NHL records
Team	**ATL**	**NYI**	**NYR**	**PHI**	**WSH**	**Total**
Chicago	2−0−2	1−2−1	2−1−1	0−2−2	2−2	7−7−6
Colorado	0−4	1−3	1−1−2	1−2−1	1−1−2	4−11−5
Edmonton	1−2−1	2−1−1	1−3	0−3−1	3−1	7−10−3
St. Louis	1−3	1−3	0−4	0−2−2	2−2	4−14−2
Vancouver	2−2	2−1−1	0−4	1−3	1−3	6−13−1
Winnipeg	0−4	0−2−2	2−2	0−4	0−3−1	2−15−3

**Vs. Wales Conference**

**Vs. Adams Division**

1979–80 NHL records
Team	**BOS**	**BUF**	**MIN**	**QUE**	**TOR**	**Total**
Chicago	2−2	1−1−2	2−1−1	2−1−1	4−0	11−5−4
Colorado	1−2−1	1−3	1−3	1−3	0−3−1	4−14−2
Edmonton	0−4	1−2−1	1−1−2	2−2	2−1−1	6−10−4
St. Louis	1−1−2	2−2	1−3	2−2	2−2	8−10−2
Vancouver	0−1−3	0−1−3	2−1−1	2−2	1−3	5−8−7
Winnipeg	1−3	0−3−1	1−2−1	2−2	0−4	4−14−2

**Vs. Norris Division**

1979–80 NHL records
Team	**DET**	**HFD**	**LAK**	**MTL**	**PIT**	**Total**
Chicago	3−1	1−1−2	0−3−1	2−2	2−0−2	8−7−5
Colorado	3−1	1−2−1	0−4	1−3	2−2	7−12−1
Edmonton	1−2−1	1−2−1	2−1−1	1−3	3−1	8−9−3
St. Louis	2−1−1	2−2	3−1	2−2	2−1−1	11−7−2
Vancouver	2−2	1−1−2	2−2	2−2	1−2−1	8−9−3
Winnipeg	1−3	2−2	2−1−1	1−3	0−4	6−13−1

== Schedule and results ==
1979–80 regular season
October

Game	Result	Date	Score	Opponent	Record	Attendance
1	L	October 10, 1979	2–4	@ Pittsburgh Penguins (1979–80)	0–1–0	8,752
2	L	October 11, 1979	0–4	@ Boston Bruins (1979–80)	0–2–0	10,613
3	W	October 14, 1979	4–2	Colorado Rockies (1979–80)	1–2–0	12,648
4	L	October 17, 1979	1–5	Detroit Red Wings (1979–80)	1–3–0	12,145
5	W	October 19, 1979	3–2	Minnesota North Stars (1979–80)	2–3–0	11,035
6	L	October 20, 1979	1–4	@ Colorado Rockies (1979–80)	2–4–0	7,758
7	L	October 24, 1979	0–4	@ Chicago Black Hawks (1979–80)	2–5–0	9,726
8	W	October 26, 1979	3–2	Boston Bruins (1979–80)	3–5–0	13,699
9	T	October 28, 1979	2–2	St. Louis Blues (1979–80)	3–5–1	11,763
10	W	October 31, 1979	5–2	@ Quebec Nordiques (1979–80)	4–5–1	10,430

November

Game	Result	Date	Score	Opponent	Record	Attendance
11	T	November 2, 1979	1–1	Washington Capitals (1979–80)	4–5–2	11,512
12	T	November 4, 1979	4–4	New York Islanders (1979–80)	4–5–3	12,478
13	L	November 6, 1979	0–8	@ Atlanta Flames (1979–80)	4–6–3	7,296
14	L	November 7, 1979	3–6	@ Washington Capitals (1979–80)	4–7–3	6,308
15	L	November 10, 1979	4–8	Toronto Maple Leafs (1979–80)	4–8–3	14,347
16	W	November 14, 1979	3–2	Hartford Whalers (1979–80)	5–8–3	12,736
17	L	November 16, 1979	2–3	Quebec Nordiques (1979–80)	5–9–3	12,401
18	L	November 18, 1979	2–3	Pittsburgh Penguins (1979–80)	5–10–3	12,668
19	W	November 21, 1979	6–4	@ New York Rangers (1979–80)	6–10–3	17,406
20	L	November 22, 1979	0–7	@ Montreal Canadiens (1979–80)	6–11–3	16,921
21	W	November 24, 1979	5–3	Vancouver Canucks (1979–80)	7–11–3	13,110
22	L	November 27, 1979	3–5	@ Los Angeles Kings (1979–80)	7–12–3	7,914
23	L	November 28, 1979	2–4	@ Vancouver Canucks (1979–80)	7–13–3	12,584

December

Game	Result	Date	Score	Opponent	Record	Attendance
24	T	December 1, 1979	4–4	@ Minnesota North Stars (1979–80)	7–13–4	12,763
25	L	December 2, 1979	0–4	New York Islanders (1979–80)	7–14–4	14,041
26	W	December 4, 1979	4–2	@ St. Louis Blues (1979–80)	8–14–4	8,383
27	L	December 5, 1979	4–6	@ Detroit Red Wings (1979–80)	8–15–4	12,278
28	W	December 7, 1979	8–3	Edmonton Oilers (1979–80)	9–15–4	11,772
29	L	December 9, 1979	4–5	Atlanta Flames (1979–80)	9–16–4	12,579
30	L	December 12, 1979	0–5	@ Quebec Nordiques (1979–80)	9–17–4	10,326
31	W	December 15, 1979	6–2	Montreal Canadiens (1979–80)	10–17–4	15,723
32	W	December 16, 1979	4–3	@ Edmonton Oilers (1979–80)	11–17–4	15,423
33	L	December 19, 1979	2–3	Buffalo Sabres (1979–80)	11–18–4	12,696
34	W	December 21, 1979	4–1	Chicago Black Hawks (1979–80)	12–18–4	13,406
35	L	December 26, 1979	0–6	@ Minnesota North Stars (1979–80)	12–19–4	15,623
36	L	December 28, 1979	3–5	Philadelphia Flyers (1979–80)	12–20–4	16,038
37	L	December 29, 1979	1–6	@ Toronto Maple Leafs (1979–80)	12–21–4	16,485
38	L	December 31, 1979	2–6	@ Buffalo Sabres (1979–80)	12–22–4	16,433

January

Game	Result	Date	Score	Opponent	Record	Attendance
39	L	January 4, 1980	1–2	Boston Bruins (1979–80)	12–23–4	15,040
40	T	January 6, 1980	4–4	Los Angeles Kings (1979–80)	12–23–5	12,250
41	L	January 8, 1980	0–2	@ Atlanta Flames (1979–80)	12–24–5	6,138
42	L	January 10, 1980	4–5	@ Philadelphia Flyers (1979–80)	12–25–5	17,077
43	L	January 12, 1980	0–3	New York Rangers (1979–80)	12–26–5	13,848
44	W	January 13, 1980	5–3	Los Angeles Kings (1979–80)	13–26–5	13,598
45	L	January 15, 1980	2–5	@ New York Islanders (1979–80)	13–27–5	14,256
46	L	January 16, 1980	1–4	@ New York Rangers (1979–80)	13–28–5	17,416
47	L	January 18, 1980	0–5	Detroit Red Wings (1979–80)	13–29–5	12,708
48	L	January 21, 1980	2–7	@ Hartford Whalers (1979–80)	13–30–5	7,627
49	L	January 22, 1980	4–5	@ Washington Capitals (1979–80)	13–31–5	7,028
50	L	January 25, 1980	4–5	Philadelphia Flyers (1979–80)	13–32–5	15,122
51	T	January 27, 1980	6–6	St. Louis Blues (1979–80)	13–32–6	12,938
52	W	January 29, 1980	7–3	@ Los Angeles Kings (1979–80)	14–32–6	7,165

February

Game	Result	Date	Score	Opponent	Record	Attendance
53	L	February 1, 1980	2–9	@ Edmonton Oilers (1979–80)	14–33–6	15,423
54	T	February 2, 1980	2–2	@ Colorado Rockies (1979–80)	14–33–7	13,308
55	L	February 8, 1980	3–6	Washington Capitals (1979–80)	14–34–7	11,917
56	T	February 10, 1980	2–2	Edmonton Oilers (1979–80)	14–34–8	11,588
57	T	February 12, 1980	0–0	@ New York Islanders (1979–80)	14–34–9	13,898
58	L	February 14, 1980	1–5	@ Philadelphia Flyers (1979–80)	14–35–9	17,077
59	L	February 15, 1980	4–5	@ Hartford Whalers (1979–80)	14–36–9	10,136
60	W	February 17, 1980	6–5	Quebec Nordiques (1979–80)	15–36–9	12,328
61	L	February 20, 1980	3–4	@ Buffalo Sabres (1979–80)	15–37–9	16,433
62	L	February 21, 1980	0–3	@ Montreal Canadiens (1979–80)	15–38–9	15,799
63	L	February 23, 1980	3–9	Toronto Maple Leafs (1979–80)	15–39–9	15,171
64	L	February 27, 1980	2–3	@ Pittsburgh Penguins (1979–80)	15–40–9	8,977
65	T	February 29, 1980	3–3	Vancouver Canucks (1979–80)	15–40–10	13,667

March

Game	Result	Date	Score	Opponent	Record	Attendance
66	L	March 2, 1980	2–3	Chicago Black Hawks (1979–80)	15–41–10	13,669
67	L	March 4, 1980	1–2	@ Vancouver Canucks (1979–80)	15–42–10	15,085
68	L	March 9, 1980	2–5	Atlanta Flames (1979–80)	15–43–10	12,412
69	T	March 12, 1980	3–3	Buffalo Sabres (1979–80)	15–43–11	14,299
70	L	March 14, 1980	3–4	Montreal Canadiens (1979–80)	15–44–11	N/A
71	W	March 16, 1980	6–2	@ Detroit Red Wings (1979–80)	16–44–11	12,014
72	L	March 19, 1980	1–9	@ Toronto Maple Leafs (1979–80)	16–45–11	16,485
73	W	March 21, 1980	4–2	New York Rangers (1979–80)	17–45–11	15,170
74	L	March 23, 1980	2–4	Pittsburgh Penguins (1979–80)	17–46–11	12,377
75	W	March 26, 1980	7–0	Hartford Whalers (1979–80)	18–46–11	13,151
76	L	March 28, 1980	1–2	Minnesota North Stars (1979–80)	18–47–11	13,100
77	L	March 30, 1980	1–3	@ Boston Bruins (1979–80)	18–48–11	11,686

April

Game	Result	Date	Score	Opponent	Record	Attendance
78	W	April 2, 1980	5–2	@ Chicago Black Hawks (1979–80)	19–48–11	9,374
79	L	April 5, 1980	0–6	@ St. Louis Blues (1979–80)	19–49–11	13,261
80	W	April 6, 1980	3–2	Colorado Rockies (1979–80)	20–49–11	14,236

Legend: Win (2 points) Loss (0 points) Tie (1 point)

== Player statistics ==
=== Regular season ===
Scoring

Player	Pos	GP	G	A	Pts	PIM	+/-	PPG	SHG	GWG
Morris Lukowich	LW	78	35	39	74	77	-16	13	1	2
Peter Sullivan	C	79	24	35	59	20	-45	5	0	3
Ron Wilson	C	79	21	36	57	28	-12	6	0	3
Willy Lindstrom	RW	79	23	26	49	20	-19	5	0	4
Craig Norwich	D	70	10	35	45	36	-11	7	0	0
Peter Marsh	RW	57	18	20	38	59	-38	9	0	0
Lars-Erik Sjoberg	D	79	7	27	34	48	-35	3	1	0
Jude Drouin	C	78	8	16	24	50	-38	1	2	1
Scott Campbell	D	63	3	17	20	136	-39	0	0	2
Lyle Moffat	LW	74	10	9	19	38	-24	0	0	1
Dave Christian	RW	15	8	10	18	2	-5	3	0	0
John Markell	LW	38	10	7	17	21	-12	2	0	1
Lorne Stamler	LW	62	8	7	15	12	-29	0	0	0
Al Cameron	D	63	3	11	14	72	-26	0	0	0
Ross Cory	D	46	2	9	11	32	-16	1	0	0
Kris Manery	C/RW	16	6	4	10	6	-8	4	0	0
Bobby Hull	LW	18	4	6	10	0	-7	1	0	0
Barry Melrose	D	74	4	6	10	124	-41	0	0	1
Jimmy Mann	RW	72	3	5	8	287	-20	1	0	1
Hilliard Graves	RW	35	1	5	6	15	-13	0	0	0
Bill Riley	RW	14	3	2	5	7	0	2	0	1
Gord McTavish	C	10	1	3	4	2	4	0	0	0
Dave Hoyda	LW	15	1	1	2	35	-4	0	0	0
John Bethel	LW	17	0	2	2	4	-3	0	0	0
Pierre Hamel	G	35	0	2	2	10	0	0	0	0
Pat Daley	LW	5	1	0	1	4	-2	0	0	0
Bob Guindon	LW	6	0	1	1	0	2	0	0	0
Bill Lesuk	LW	49	0	1	1	43	-15	0	0	0
Mike Amodeo	D	19	0	0	0	2	-15	0	0	0
Wayne Dillon	C	13	0	0	0	2	-6	0	0	0
Larry Hopkins	LW	5	0	0	0	0	-3	0	0	0
Don MacIver	D	6	0	0	0	2	-5	0	0	0
Markus Mattsson	G	21	0	0	0	2	0	0	0	0
Lindsay Middlebrook	G	10	0	0	0	0	0	0	0	0
Gerry Rioux	RW	8	0	0	0	6	-2	0	0	0
Gary Smith	G	20	0	0	0	25	0	0	0	0
Gord Smith	D	13	0	0	0	8	-5	0	0	0
Glenn Tomalty	LW	1	0	0	0	0	0	0	0	0

Goaltending

Player	MIN	GP	W	L	T	GA	GAA	SO
Pierre Hamel	1947	35	9	19	3	130	4.01	0
Markus Mattsson	1200	21	5	11	4	65	3.25	2
Gary Smith	1073	20	4	11	4	73	4.08	0
Lindsay Middlebrook	580	10	2	8	0	40	4.14	0
Team:	4800	80	20	49	11	308	3.85	2

Note:

Pos = Position;GP = Games played; G = Goals; A = Assists; Pts = Points; PIM = Penalty minutes; +/- = Plus/minus; PPG = Power-play goals; SHG = Short-handed goals; GWG = Game-winning goals
Pos = Position;GP = Games played; Min, TOI = Minutes played; W = Wins; L = Losses; T,T/OT = Ties; OTL = Overtime losses; GA = Goals-against; GAA = Goals-against average; SO = Shutouts; SA = Shots against; SV = Shots saved;SV% = Save percentage;

== Transactions ==
=== Trades ===
June 28, 1979	To Quebec Nordiques Jamie Hislop	To Winnipeg Jets Barry Legge
July 25, 1979	To New York Rangers Future Considerations	To Winnipeg Jets Wayne Dillon
August 1, 1979	To Atlanta Flames Paul Terbenche	To Winnipeg Jets Future Considerations
October 4, 1979	To Montreal Canadiens Cash	To Winnipeg Jets Ron Wilson
October 15, 1979	To New York Rangers Cash; Future Considerations	To Winnipeg Jets Bud Stefanski
February 27, 1980	To Hartford Whalers Bobby Hull	To Winnipeg Jets Future Considerations

=== Waivers ===
February 27, 1980	From Vancouver Canucks Kris Manery

=== Free agents ===
Player	Former team
Willy Lindstrom	Winnipeg Jets (WHA)
Larry Hopkins	Toronto Maple Leafs
John Bethel	Undrafted Free Agent
Benoit Gosselin	New York Rangers
Gerry Rioux	Undrafted Free Agent
Glenn Tomalty	Undrafted Free Agent
Ross Cory	Undrafted Free Agent
Jude Drouin	New York Islanders
Mark Plantery	Undrafted Free Agent
Don MacIver	Undrafted Free Agent
Anders Steen	Undrafted Free Agent

== Draft picks ==
=== NHL amateur draft ===
Winnipeg's picks at the 1979 NHL entry draft, which was held at the Queen Elizabeth Hotel in Montreal on August 9, 1979.

Round	Pick	Player	Nationality	College/Junior/Club team
1	19	Jimmy Mann (RW)	Canada	Sherbrooke Castors (QMJHL)
2	40	Dave Christian (RW)	United States	University of North Dakota (NCAA)
3	61	Bill Whelton (D)	United States	Boston University (NCAA)
4	82	Pat Daley (LW)	Canada	Montreal Juniors (QMJHL)
5	103	Thomas Steen (C)	Sweden	Färjestad BK Karlstad (SEL)
6	124	Tim Watters (D)	Canada	Michigan Tech (NCAA)

=== Expansion Draft ===
==== Reclaimed Players ====
Reclaiming of Players: The 17 existing NHL teams were allowed to reclaim any rights to former WHA players they held. The four incoming franchises, however, were allowed to protect up to two goaltenders and two skaters, voiding their NHL rights. These players were considered "priority selections" in the expansion draft. Gordie Howe was one of two special cases (the other being Wayne Gretzky), as a gentlemen's agreement between the Hartford Whalers and the Detroit Red Wings, which held his rights, led to the Wings declining to reclaim Howe.

These are Winnipeg players whose NHL rights were reclaimed when the WHA merged with the NHL. This list is incomplete.

#	Player	Reclaimed From	Reclaimed By
4.	Bobby Hull (LW)	Winnipeg Jets	Chicago Blackhawks

==== Jets selections ====
#	Player	Drafted From	Drafted By
1.	Peter Marsh (LW)	Pittsburgh Penguins	Winnipeg Jets
2.	Lindsay Middlebrook (G)	New York Rangers	Winnipeg Jets
3.	Bobby Hull (LW)	Chicago Black Hawks	Winnipeg Jets
4.	Al Cameron (D)	Detroit Red Wings	Winnipeg Jets
5.	Dave Hoyda (LW)	Philadelphia Flyers	Winnipeg Jets
6.	Jim Roberts (LW)	Minnesota North Stars	Winnipeg Jets
7.	Lorne Stamler (LW)	Toronto Maple Leafs	Winnipeg Jets
8.	Mark Heaslip (RW)	Los Angeles Kings	Winnipeg Jets
9.	Pierre Hamel (G)	Toronto Maple Leafs	Winnipeg Jets
10.	Gord McTavish (F)	St. Louis Blues	Winnipeg Jets
11.	Gord Smith (D)	Washington Capitals	Winnipeg Jets
12.	Clark Hamilton (C)	Detroit Red Wings	Winnipeg Jets
13.	Jim Cunningham (LW)	Philadelphia Flyers	Winnipeg Jets
14.	Dennis Abgrall (RW)	Los Angeles Kings	Winnipeg Jets
15.	Bill Riley (W)	Washington Capitals	Winnipeg Jets
16.	Gene Carr (C)	Atlanta Flames	Winnipeg Jets
17.	Hilliard Graves (RW)	Vancouver Canucks	Winnipeg Jets
