= Tomalty =

Tomalty is a surname. Notable people with the surname include:

- Glenn Tomalty (born 1954), Canadian ice hockey player
- Jonas Tomalty (born 1979), Canadian vocalist

== See also ==
- Tumulty, surname
