= 1979–80 Colorado Rockies season =

NHL hockey team season

1979–80 Colorado Rockies
- Division: 5th Smythe
- Conference: 11th Campbell
- 1979–80 record: 19–48–13
- Home record: 12–20–8
- Road record: 7–28–5
- Goals for: 234
- Goals against: 308

Team information
- General manager: Ray Miron
- Coach: Don Cherry
- Captain: Mike Christie
- Alternate captains: None
- Arena: McNichols Sports Arena
- Average attendance: 9,787 (61.6%)

Team leaders
- Goals: Rene Robert (28)
- Assists: Rene Robert (35)
- Points: Rene Robert (63)
- Penalty minutes: Rob Ramage (135)
- Wins: Hardy Astrom (9); Bill McKenzie (9)
- Goals against average: Bill McKenzie (3.49)

The 1979–80 Colorado Rockies season was the franchise's fourth season in Colorado and their sixth in the NHL. Trying to jolt the fan base and create some excitement for the club, the team hired Don Cherry, who had been fired by the Boston Bruins, and installed him as the new head coach. In addition, a major mid-season trade netted the Rockies legendary goal-scorer and future Hall-of-Famer Lanny McDonald from the Toronto Maple Leafs.

With the first pick overall in the draft, the Rockies selected offensive-minded defenseman Rob Ramage. It was the first time that the Rockies had the first pick overall.

== Offseason ==
=== NHL draft ===
| Round | # | Player | Position | Nationality | College/Junior/Club team |
|---|---|---|---|---|---|
| 1 | 1 | Rob Ramage | Defense | Canada | London Knights (OHL) |
| 4 | 64 | Steve Peters | Center | Canada | Oshawa Generals (OMJHL) |
| 5 | 85 | Gary Dillon | Center | Canada | Toronto Marlboros (OMJHL) |
| 6 | 106 | Bob Attwell | Right wing | Canada | Peterborough Petes (OMJHL) |

== Regular season ==
=== Season standings ===
Smythe Division
| | GP | W | L | T | GF | GA | Pts |
|---|---|---|---|---|---|---|---|
| **Chicago Black Hawks** | 80 | 34 | 27 | 19 | 241 | 250 | 87 |
| **St. Louis Blues** | 80 | 34 | 34 | 12 | 266 | 278 | 80 |
| **Vancouver Canucks** | 80 | 27 | 37 | 16 | 256 | 281 | 70 |
| **Edmonton Oilers** | 80 | 28 | 39 | 13 | 301 | 322 | 69 |
| Winnipeg Jets | 80 | 20 | 49 | 11 | 214 | 314 | 51 |
| Colorado Rockies | 80 | 19 | 48 | 13 | 234 | 308 | 51 |

Note: GP = Games played, W = Wins, L = Losses, T = Ties, Pts = Points, GF = Goals for, GA = Goals against
Note: Teams that qualified for the playoffs are highlighted in bold.

League standings
| R | | Div | GP | W | L | T | GF | GA | Pts |
|---|---|---|---|---|---|---|---|---|---|
| 1 | **p – Philadelphia Flyers** | PTK | 80 | 48 | 12 | 20 | 327 | 254 | 116 |
| 2 | **y – Buffalo Sabres** | ADM | 80 | 47 | 17 | 16 | 318 | 201 | 110 |
| 3 | **x – Montreal Canadiens** | NRS | 80 | 47 | 20 | 13 | 328 | 240 | 107 |
| 4 | **Boston Bruins** | ADM | 80 | 46 | 21 | 13 | 310 | 234 | 105 |
| 5 | **New York Islanders** | PTK | 80 | 39 | 28 | 13 | 281 | 247 | 91 |
| 6 | **Minnesota North Stars** | ADM | 80 | 36 | 28 | 16 | 311 | 253 | 88 |
| 7 | **x – Chicago Black Hawks** | SMY | 80 | 34 | 27 | 19 | 241 | 250 | 87 |
| 8 | **New York Rangers** | PTK | 80 | 38 | 32 | 10 | 308 | 284 | 86 |
| 9 | **Atlanta Flames** | PTK | 80 | 35 | 32 | 13 | 282 | 269 | 83 |
| 10 | **St. Louis Blues** | SMY | 80 | 34 | 34 | 12 | 266 | 278 | 80 |
| 11 | **Toronto Maple Leafs** | ADM | 80 | 35 | 40 | 5 | 304 | 327 | 75 |
| 12 | **Los Angeles Kings** | NRS | 80 | 30 | 36 | 14 | 290 | 313 | 74 |
| 13 | **Pittsburgh Penguins** | NRS | 80 | 30 | 37 | 13 | 251 | 303 | 73 |
| 14 | **Hartford Whalers** | NRS | 80 | 27 | 34 | 19 | 303 | 312 | 73 |
| 15 | **Vancouver Canucks** | SMY | 80 | 27 | 37 | 16 | 256 | 281 | 70 |
| 16 | **Edmonton Oilers** | SMY | 80 | 28 | 39 | 13 | 301 | 322 | 69 |
| 17 | Washington Capitals | PTK | 80 | 27 | 40 | 13 | 261 | 293 | 67 |
| 18 | Detroit Red Wings | NRS | 80 | 26 | 43 | 11 | 268 | 306 | 63 |
| 19 | Quebec Nordiques | ADM | 80 | 25 | 44 | 11 | 248 | 313 | 61 |
| 20 | Winnipeg Jets | SMY | 80 | 20 | 49 | 11 | 214 | 314 | 51 |
| 21 | Colorado Rockies | SMY | 80 | 19 | 48 | 13 | 234 | 308 | 51 |

Divisions: ADM – Adams, NRS – Norris, PTK – Patrick, SMY – Smythe

bold – The top 16 teams in the league qualified for the playoffs, regardless of division or conference.
x – Won division; y – Won Conference (and division); p – Won Presidents' Trophy (and conference and division)

=== Record vs. opponents ===
Smythe Division record vs. opponents

==== Vs. Campbell Conference ====
**Vs. Smythe Division**

1979–80 NHL records
| Team | **CHI** | **COL** | **EDM** | **STL** | **VAN** | **WIN** | **Total** |
|---|---|---|---|---|---|---|---|
| Chicago | — | 3−0−1 | 1−3 | 1−2−1 | 1−1−2 | 2−2 | 8−8−4 |
| Colorado | 0−3−1 | — | 2−2 | 0−2−2 | 1−2−1 | 1−2−1 | 4−11−5 |
| Edmonton | 3−1 | 2−2 | — | 0−3−1 | 1−2−1 | 1−2−1 | 7−10−3 |
| St. Louis | 2−1−1 | 2−0−2 | 3−0−1 | — | 3−1 | 1−1−2 | 11−3−6 |
| Vancouver | 1−1−2 | 2−1−1 | 2−1−1 | 1−3 | — | 2−1−1 | 8−7−5 |
| Winnipeg | 2−2 | 2−1−1 | 1−2−1 | 2−2 | 1−2−1 | — | 8−9−3 |

**Vs. Patrick Division**

1979–80 NHL records
| Team | **ATL** | **NYI** | **NYR** | **PHI** | **WSH** | **Total** |
|---|---|---|---|---|---|---|
| Chicago | 2−0−2 | 1−2−1 | 2−1−1 | 0−2−2 | 2−2 | 7−7−6 |
| Colorado | 0−4 | 1−3 | 1−1−2 | 1−2−1 | 1−1−2 | 4−11−5 |
| Edmonton | 1−2−1 | 2−1−1 | 1−3 | 0−3−1 | 3−1 | 7−10−3 |
| St. Louis | 1−3 | 1−3 | 0−4 | 0−2−2 | 2−2 | 4−14−2 |
| Vancouver | 2−2 | 2−1−1 | 0−4 | 1−3 | 1−3 | 6−13−1 |
| Winnipeg | 0−4 | 0−2−2 | 2−2 | 0−4 | 0−3−1 | 2−15−3 |

**Vs. Wales Conference**

**Vs. Adams Division**

1979–80 NHL records
| Team | **BOS** | **BUF** | **MIN** | **QUE** | **TOR** | **Total** |
|---|---|---|---|---|---|---|
| Chicago | 2−2 | 1−1−2 | 2−1−1 | 2−1−1 | 4−0 | 11−5−4 |
| Colorado | 1−2−1 | 1−3 | 1−3 | 1−3 | 0−3−1 | 4−14−2 |
| Edmonton | 0−4 | 1−2−1 | 1−1−2 | 2−2 | 2−1−1 | 6−10−4 |
| St. Louis | 1−1−2 | 2−2 | 1−3 | 2−2 | 2−2 | 8−10−2 |
| Vancouver | 0−1−3 | 0−1−3 | 2−1−1 | 2−2 | 1−3 | 5−8−7 |
| Winnipeg | 1−3 | 0−3−1 | 1−2−1 | 2−2 | 0−4 | 4−14−2 |

**Vs. Norris Division**

1979–80 NHL records
| Team | **DET** | **HFD** | **LAK** | **MTL** | **PIT** | **Total** |
|---|---|---|---|---|---|---|
| Chicago | 3−1 | 1−1−2 | 0−3−1 | 2−2 | 2−0−2 | 8−7−5 |
| Colorado | 3−1 | 1−2−1 | 0−4 | 1−3 | 2−2 | 7−12−1 |
| Edmonton | 1−2−1 | 1−2−1 | 2−1−1 | 1−3 | 3−1 | 8−9−3 |
| St. Louis | 2−1−1 | 2−2 | 3−1 | 2−2 | 2−1−1 | 11−7−2 |
| Vancouver | 2−2 | 1−1−2 | 2−2 | 2−2 | 1−2−1 | 8−9−3 |
| Winnipeg | 1−3 | 2−2 | 2−1−1 | 1−3 | 0−4 | 6−13−1 |

== Schedule and results ==
1979–80 regular season
October

| Game | Result | Date | Score | Opponent | Record |
|---|---|---|---|---|---|
| 1 | T | October 11, 1979 | 3–3 | St. Louis Blues (1979–80) | 0–0–1 |
| 2 | L | October 13, 1979 | 1–2 | @ Toronto Maple Leafs (1979–80) | 0–1–1 |
| 3 | L | October 14, 1979 | 2–4 | @ Winnipeg Jets (1979–80) | 0–2–1 |
| 4 | L | October 18, 1979 | 2–5 | Quebec Nordiques (1979–80) | 0–3–1 |
| 5 | W | October 20, 1979 | 4–1 | Winnipeg Jets (1979–80) | 1–3–1 |
| 6 | L | October 23, 1979 | 4–7 | Los Angeles Kings (1979–80) | 1–4–1 |
| 7 | T | October 26, 1979 | 2–2 | Toronto Maple Leafs (1979–80) | 1–4–2 |
| 8 | L | October 28, 1979 | 2–4 | @ Buffalo Sabres (1979–80) | 1–5–2 |
| 9 | L | October 30, 1979 | 1–3 | @ Atlanta Flames (1979–80) | 1–6–2 |
| 10 | L | October 31, 1979 | 2–4 | @ Pittsburgh Penguins (1979–80) | 1–7–2 |

November

| Game | Result | Date | Score | Opponent | Record |
|---|---|---|---|---|---|
| 11 | W | November 3, 1979 | 7–2 | New York Rangers (1979–80) | 2–7–2 |
| 12 | L | November 6, 1979 | 2–7 | Hartford Whalers (1979–80) | 2–8–2 |
| 13 | L | November 9, 1979 | 5–6 | Minnesota North Stars (1979–80) | 2–9–2 |
| 14 | W | November 11, 1979 | 5–3 | @ Buffalo Sabres (1979–80) | 3–9–2 |
| 15 | L | November 13, 1979 | 1–4 | @ Los Angeles Kings (1979–80) | 3–10–2 |
| 16 | L | November 15, 1979 | 1–4 | Montreal Canadiens (1979–80) | 3–11–2 |
| 17 | L | November 17, 1979 | 1–4 | Chicago Black Hawks (1979–80) | 3–12–2 |
| 18 | T | November 20, 1979 | 3–3 | Washington Capitals (1979–80) | 3–12–3 |
| 19 | W | November 23, 1979 | 5–2 | Detroit Red Wings (1979–80) | 4–12–3 |
| 20 | L | November 24, 1979 | 3–4 | @ St. Louis Blues (1979–80) | 4–13–3 |
| 21 | W | November 28, 1979 | 7–4 | New York Islanders (1979–80) | 5–13–3 |

December

| Game | Result | Date | Score | Opponent | Record |
|---|---|---|---|---|---|
| 22 | L | December 1, 1979 | 4–5 | @ Pittsburgh Penguins (1979–80) | 5–14–3 |
| 23 | W | December 2, 1979 | 5–3 | @ Boston Bruins (1979–80) | 6–14–3 |
| 24 | W | December 4, 1979 | 3–1 | @ Quebec Nordiques (1979–80) | 7–14–3 |
| 25 | L | December 7, 1979 | 3–5 | Buffalo Sabres (1979–80) | 7–15–3 |
| 26 | W | December 9, 1979 | 7–5 | @ Montreal Canadiens (1979–80) | 8–15–3 |
| 27 | L | December 12, 1979 | 3–5 | @ Toronto Maple Leafs (1979–80) | 8–16–3 |
| 28 | L | December 14, 1979 | 3–5 | @ Vancouver Canucks (1979–80) | 8–17–3 |
| 29 | W | December 15, 1979 | 6–5 | Hartford Whalers (1979–80) | 9–17–3 |
| 30 | L | December 18, 1979 | 2–3 | @ New York Islanders (1979–80) | 9–18–3 |
| 31 | L | December 19, 1979 | 3–6 | @ Quebec Nordiques (1979–80) | 9–19–3 |
| 32 | W | December 21, 1979 | 5–4 | Edmonton Oilers (1979–80) | 10–19–3 |
| 33 | L | December 26, 1979 | 3–4 | @ Edmonton Oilers (1979–80) | 10–20–3 |
| 34 | W | December 27, 1979 | 4–3 | Minnesota North Stars (1979–80) | 11–20–3 |
| 35 | L | December 29, 1979 | 2–3 | Philadelphia Flyers (1979–80) | 11–21–3 |
| 36 | W | December 31, 1979 | 5–3 | @ Detroit Red Wings (1979–80) | 12–21–3 |

January

| Game | Result | Date | Score | Opponent | Record |
|---|---|---|---|---|---|
| 37 | L | January 2, 1980 | 2–5 | @ Chicago Black Hawks (1979–80) | 12–22–3 |
| 38 | L | January 4, 1980 | 2–4 | Vancouver Canucks (1979–80) | 12–23–3 |
| 39 | T | January 8, 1980 | 2–2 | Boston Bruins (1979–80) | 12–23–4 |
| 40 | L | January 11, 1980 | 3–4 | Buffalo Sabres (1979–80) | 12–24–4 |
| 41 | L | January 13, 1980 | 2–6 | @ Boston Bruins (1979–80) | 12–25–4 |
| 42 | T | January 14, 1980 | 6–6 | @ New York Rangers (1979–80) | 12–25–5 |
| 43 | L | January 16, 1980 | 1–5 | @ Detroit Red Wings (1979–80) | 12–26–5 |
| 44 | L | January 17, 1980 | 1–4 | Atlanta Flames (1979–80) | 12–27–5 |
| 45 | L | January 19, 1980 | 1–3 | St. Louis Blues (1979–80) | 12–28–5 |
| 46 | W | January 22, 1980 | 5–3 | @ Vancouver Canucks (1979–80) | 13–28–5 |
| 47 | W | January 24, 1980 | 4–1 | Pittsburgh Penguins (1979–80) | 14–28–5 |
| 48 | T | January 26, 1980 | 4–4 | @ St. Louis Blues (1979–80) | 14–28–6 |
| 49 | T | January 27, 1980 | 3–3 | New York Rangers (1979–80) | 14–28–7 |
| 50 | L | January 30, 1980 | 2–3 | Montreal Canadiens (1979–80) | 14–29–7 |

February

| Game | Result | Date | Score | Opponent | Record |
|---|---|---|---|---|---|
| 51 | T | February 2, 1980 | 2–2 | Winnipeg Jets (1979–80) | 14–29–8 |
| 52 | L | February 3, 1980 | 2–6 | @ Minnesota North Stars (1979–80) | 14–30–8 |
| 53 | L | February 7, 1980 | 3–4 | @ Montreal Canadiens (1979–80) | 14–31–8 |
| 54 | T | February 8, 1980 | 4–4 | @ Hartford Whalers (1979–80) | 14–31–9 |
| 55 | L | February 10, 1980 | 1–6 | Atlanta Flames (1979–80) | 14–32–9 |
| 56 | L | February 14, 1980 | 3–5 | New York Islanders (1979–80) | 14–33–9 |
| 57 | L | February 16, 1980 | 3–5 | Boston Bruins (1979–80) | 14–34–9 |
| 58 | W | February 19, 1980 | 8–6 | Philadelphia Flyers (1979–80) | 15–34–9 |
| 59 | W | February 22, 1980 | 3–1 | Edmonton Oilers (1979–80) | 16–34–9 |
| 60 | T | February 24, 1980 | 1–1 | Washington Capitals (1979–80) | 16–34–10 |
| 61 | L | February 27, 1980 | 3–4 | Toronto Maple Leafs (1979–80) | 16–35–10 |

March

| Game | Result | Date | Score | Opponent | Record |
|---|---|---|---|---|---|
| 62 | L | March 1, 1980 | 1–4 | @ Atlanta Flames (1979–80) | 16–36–10 |
| 63 | W | March 2, 1980 | 3–1 | @ Washington Capitals (1979–80) | 17–36–10 |
| 64 | L | March 4, 1980 | 1–4 | @ Philadelphia Flyers (1979–80) | 17–37–10 |
| 65 | L | March 7, 1980 | 2–4 | Chicago Black Hawks (1979–80) | 17–38–10 |
| 66 | T | March 9, 1980 | 4–4 | Vancouver Canucks (1979–80) | 17–38–11 |
| 67 | L | March 11, 1980 | 1–4 | @ New York Islanders (1979–80) | 17–39–11 |
| 68 | L | March 12, 1980 | 0–6 | @ New York Rangers (1979–80) | 17–40–11 |
| 69 | L | March 15, 1980 | 1–4 | @ Hartford Whalers (1979–80) | 17–41–11 |
| 70 | T | March 16, 1980 | 4–4 | @ Philadelphia Flyers (1979–80) | 17–41–12 |
| 71 | L | March 18, 1980 | 1–4 | @ Washington Capitals (1979–80) | 17–42–12 |
| 72 | L | March 20, 1980 | 2–6 | Quebec Nordiques (1979–80) | 17–43–12 |
| 73 | W | March 22, 1980 | 5–1 | Detroit Red Wings (1979–80) | 18–43–12 |
| 74 | L | March 23, 1980 | 1–7 | @ Minnesota North Stars (1979–80) | 18–44–12 |
| 75 | L | March 25, 1980 | 2–5 | Los Angeles Kings (1979–80) | 18–45–12 |
| 76 | W | March 28, 1980 | 5–0 | Pittsburgh Penguins (1979–80) | 19–45–12 |
| 77 | T | March 30, 1980 | 2–2 | @ Chicago Black Hawks (1979–80) | 19–45–13 |

April

| Game | Result | Date | Score | Opponent | Record |
|---|---|---|---|---|---|
| 78 | L | April 1, 1980 | 3–4 | @ Los Angeles Kings (1979–80) | 19–46–13 |
| 79 | L | April 4, 1980 | 2–6 | @ Edmonton Oilers (1979–80) | 19–47–13 |
| 80 | L | April 6, 1980 | 2–3 | @ Winnipeg Jets (1979–80) | 19–48–13 |

Legend: Win (2 points) Loss (0 points) Tie (1 point)

== Player statistics ==
=== Regular season ===
Scoring

| Player | Pos | GP | G | A | Pts | PIM | +/- | PPG | SHG | GWG |
|---|---|---|---|---|---|---|---|---|---|---|
| Rene Robert | RW | 69 | 28 | 35 | 63 | 79 | -20 | 10 | 0 | 0 |
| Mike McEwen | D | 67 | 11 | 40 | 51 | 33 | -13 | 5 | 1 | 1 |
| Jack Valiquette | C | 77 | 25 | 25 | 50 | 8 | -7 | 6 | 0 | 2 |
| Lanny McDonald | RW | 46 | 25 | 20 | 45 | 43 | -15 | 8 | 0 | 3 |
| Lucien DeBlois | C | 70 | 24 | 19 | 43 | 36 | -18 | 4 | 0 | 1 |
| Ron Delorme | C | 75 | 19 | 24 | 43 | 76 | -24 | 5 | 0 | 4 |
| Randy Pierce | RW | 75 | 16 | 23 | 39 | 100 | -11 | 0 | 0 | 1 |
| Doug Berry | C | 75 | 7 | 23 | 30 | 16 | -23 | 0 | 1 | 1 |
| Rob Ramage | D | 75 | 8 | 20 | 28 | 135 | -40 | 4 | 0 | 3 |
| Wilf Paiement | RW | 34 | 10 | 16 | 26 | 41 | -6 | 2 | 2 | 1 |
| Mike Christie | D | 74 | 1 | 17 | 18 | 78 | -30 | 0 | 0 | 0 |
| Don Saleski | RW | 51 | 8 | 8 | 16 | 23 | -17 | 0 | 0 | 0 |
| Pat Hickey | LW | 24 | 7 | 9 | 16 | 10 | -2 | 0 | 0 | 0 |
| Kevin Morrison | D | 41 | 4 | 11 | 15 | 23 | -6 | 2 | 0 | 1 |
| Bobby Schmautz | RW | 20 | 9 | 4 | 13 | 53 | -10 | 2 | 1 | 1 |
| Joel Quenneville | D | 35 | 5 | 7 | 12 | 26 | -21 | 1 | 0 | 0 |
| Trevor Johansen | D | 62 | 3 | 8 | 11 | 45 | -17 | 1 | 0 | 0 |
| Mike Gillis | LW | 40 | 4 | 5 | 9 | 22 | -18 | 1 | 0 | 0 |
| Nick Beverley | D | 46 | 0 | 9 | 9 | 10 | -4 | 0 | 0 | 0 |
| Bobby Sheehan | C | 30 | 3 | 4 | 7 | 2 | -7 | 1 | 0 | 0 |
| Rey Comeau | C | 22 | 2 | 5 | 7 | 6 | 0 | 0 | 0 | 0 |
| Mike Kitchen | D | 42 | 1 | 6 | 7 | 25 | -10 | 0 | 0 | 0 |
| Merlin Malinowski | C | 10 | 2 | 4 | 6 | 2 | -1 | 0 | 0 | 0 |
| Barry Beck | D | 10 | 1 | 5 | 6 | 8 | -2 | 0 | 0 | 0 |
| Nelson Pyatt | C | 13 | 5 | 0 | 5 | 2 | -5 | 0 | 0 | 0 |
| Barry Smith | C | 33 | 2 | 3 | 5 | 4 | -11 | 0 | 1 | 0 |
| Gary Croteau | LW | 15 | 1 | 4 | 5 | 4 | -4 | 1 | 0 | 0 |
| Walt McKechnie | C | 17 | 0 | 4 | 4 | 2 | -14 | 0 | 0 | 0 |
| Bob Attwell | RW | 7 | 1 | 1 | 2 | 0 | -5 | 0 | 0 | 0 |
| Dennis Owchar | D | 10 | 1 | 0 | 1 | 2 | -3 | 0 | 0 | 0 |
| Dean Turner | D | 27 | 1 | 0 | 1 | 51 | 0 | 0 | 0 | 0 |
| Don Ashby | C | 11 | 0 | 1 | 1 | 4 | -2 | 0 | 0 | 0 |
| John Flesch | LW | 5 | 0 | 1 | 1 | 4 | -1 | 0 | 0 | 0 |
| Mario Giallonardo | D | 8 | 0 | 1 | 1 | 2 | -3 | 0 | 0 | 0 |
| Steve Peters | C | 2 | 0 | 1 | 1 | 0 | 1 | 0 | 0 | 0 |
| Hardy Astrom | G | 49 | 0 | 0 | 0 | 6 | 0 | 0 | 0 | 0 |
| Mike Dwyer | LW | 10 | 0 | 0 | 0 | 19 | -5 | 0 | 0 | 0 |
| Bill McKenzie | G | 26 | 0 | 0 | 0 | 2 | 0 | 0 | 0 | 0 |
| Bill Oleschuk | G | 12 | 0 | 0 | 0 | 4 | 0 | 0 | 0 | 0 |
| Michel Plasse | G | 6 | 0 | 0 | 0 | 0 | 0 | 0 | 0 | 0 |
| Larry Skinner | C | 2 | 0 | 0 | 0 | 0 | -2 | 0 | 0 | 0 |
| Peter Sturgeon | LW | 2 | 0 | 0 | 0 | 0 | 0 | 0 | 0 | 0 |
| Dave Watson | LW | 5 | 0 | 0 | 0 | 2 | -1 | 0 | 0 | 0 |

Goaltending

| Player | MIN | GP | W | L | T | GA | GAA | SO |
|---|---|---|---|---|---|---|---|---|
| Hardy Astrom | 2574 | 49 | 9 | 27 | 6 | 161 | 3.75 | 0 |
| Bill McKenzie | 1342 | 26 | 9 | 12 | 3 | 78 | 3.49 | 1 |
| Bill Oleschuk | 557 | 12 | 1 | 6 | 2 | 39 | 4.20 | 0 |
| Michel Plasse | 327 | 6 | 0 | 3 | 2 | 26 | 4.77 | 0 |
| Team: | 4800 | 80 | 19 | 48 | 13 | 304 | 3.80 | 1 |

Note: GP = Games played; G = Goals; A = Assists; Pts = Points; +/- = Plus/minus; PIM = Penalty minutes; PPG=Power-play goals; SHG=Short-handed goals; GWG=Game-winning goals
MIN=Minutes played; W = Wins; L = Losses; T = Ties; GA = Goals against; GAA = Goals against average; SO = Shutouts;

== Transactions ==
On December 29, 1979, the Maple Leafs traded Lanny McDonald and Joel Quenneville to the Colorado Rockies for Wilf Paiement and Pat Hickey.

== Farm teams ==
Affiliations have included: Flint Generals, Fort Worth Texans
