= 1979–80 Washington Capitals season =

NHL hockey team season

1979–80 Washington Capitals
- Division: 5th Patrick
- Conference: 9th Campbell
- 1979–80 record: 27–40–13
- Home record: 20–14–6
- Road record: 7–26–7
- Goals for: 261
- Goals against: 293

Team information
- General manager: Max McNab
- Coach: Danny Belisle; Gary Green
- Captain: Ryan Walter
- Alternate captains: None
- Arena: Capital Centre
- Average attendance: 11,038 (60.9%)

Team leaders
- Goals: Mike Gartner (36)
- Assists: Robert Picard (43)
- Points: Mike Gartner (68)
- Penalty minutes: Paul Mulvey (240)
- Plus/minus: Mike Gartner (+16)
- Wins: Wayne Stephenson (18)
- Goals against average: Rollie Boutin (3.50)

The 1979–80 Washington Capitals season was the Washington Capitals sixth season in the National Hockey League (NHL). The Capitals failed to make the playoffs for the sixth straight year for the first time in franchise history.

== Regular season ==
Washington was tied with the Edmonton Oilers for the last playoff berth with two games remaining, but lost to the Philadelphia Flyers and tied the Atlanta Flames, while the Oilers tied the Minnesota North Stars and defeated the Colorado Rockies to finish two points ahead.

=== Final standings ===
Patrick Division
	GP	W	L	T	GF	GA	Pts
**Philadelphia Flyers**	80	48	12	20	327	254	116
**New York Islanders**	80	39	28	13	281	247	91
**New York Rangers**	80	38	32	10	308	284	86
**Atlanta Flames**	80	35	32	13	282	269	83
Washington Capitals	80	27	40	13	261	293	67

Note: GP = Games played, W = Wins, L = Losses, T = Ties, Pts = Points, GF = Goals for, GA = Goals against
Note: Teams that qualified for the playoffs are highlighted in bold.

League standings
R		Div	GP	W	L	T	GF	GA	Pts
1	**p – Philadelphia Flyers**	PTK	80	48	12	20	327	254	116
2	**y – Buffalo Sabres**	ADM	80	47	17	16	318	201	110
3	**x – Montreal Canadiens**	NRS	80	47	20	13	328	240	107
4	**Boston Bruins**	ADM	80	46	21	13	310	234	105
5	**New York Islanders**	PTK	80	39	28	13	281	247	91
6	**Minnesota North Stars**	ADM	80	36	28	16	311	253	88
7	**x – Chicago Black Hawks**	SMY	80	34	27	19	241	250	87
8	**New York Rangers**	PTK	80	38	32	10	308	284	86
9	**Atlanta Flames**	PTK	80	35	32	13	282	269	83
10	**St. Louis Blues**	SMY	80	34	34	12	266	278	80
11	**Toronto Maple Leafs**	ADM	80	35	40	5	304	327	75
12	**Los Angeles Kings**	NRS	80	30	36	14	290	313	74
13	**Pittsburgh Penguins**	NRS	80	30	37	13	251	303	73
14	**Hartford Whalers**	NRS	80	27	34	19	303	312	73
15	**Vancouver Canucks**	SMY	80	27	37	16	256	281	70
16	**Edmonton Oilers**	SMY	80	28	39	13	301	322	69
17	Washington Capitals	PTK	80	27	40	13	261	293	67
18	Detroit Red Wings	NRS	80	26	43	11	268	306	63
19	Quebec Nordiques	ADM	80	25	44	11	248	313	61
20	Winnipeg Jets	SMY	80	20	49	11	214	314	51
21	Colorado Rockies	SMY	80	19	48	13	234	308	51

Divisions: ADM – Adams, NRS – Norris, PTK – Patrick, SMY – Smythe

bold – The top 16 teams in the league qualified for the playoffs, regardless of division or conference.
x – Won division; y – Won Conference (and division); p – Won Presidents' Trophy (and conference and division)

=== Record vs. opponents ===
Patrick Division record vs. opponents

==== Vs. Campbell Conference ====
**Vs. Patrick Division**

1979–80 NHL records
Team	**ATL**	**NYI**	**NYR**	**PHI**	**WSH**	**Total**
Atlanta	—	1–3	3–0–1	2–2	3–0–1	**9−5−2**
N.Y. Islanders	3–1	—	2–2	2–2	2–2	**9−7−0**
N.Y. Rangers	0–3–1	2–2	—	1–2–1	2–2	**5−9−2**
Philadelphia	2–2	2–2	2–1–1	—	2–0–2	**8−5−3**
Washington	0–3–1	2–2	2–2	0–2–2	—	**4−9−3**

**Vs. Smythe Division**

1979–80 NHL records
Team	**CHI**	**COL**	**EDM**	**STL**	**VAN**	**WIN**	**Total**
Atlanta	0−2−2	4−0	2−1−1	3−1	2−2	4−0	**15−6−3**
N.Y. Islanders	2−1−1	3−1	1−2−1	3−1	1−2−1	2−0−2	**12−7−5**
N.Y. Rangers	1−2−1	1−1−2	3−1	4−0	4−0	2−2	**15−6−3**
Philadelphia	2–0–2	2–1–1	3–0−1	2−0−2	3−1	4−0	**16−2−6**
Washington	2−2	1−1−2	1−3	2−2	3−1	3−0−1	**12−9−3**

**Vs. Wales Conference**

**Vs. Adams Division**

1979–80 NHL records
Team	**BOS**	**BUF**	**MIN**	**QUE**	**TOR**	**Total**
Atlanta	0–4	0–3–1	1–1–2	3–0–1	1–3	**5–11–4**
N.Y. Islanders	1–3	1–2–1	0–2–2	4–0	3–1	**9–8–3**
N.Y. Rangers	2–2	1–2–1	1–2–1	2–1–1	2–2	**8–9–3**
Philadelphia	1–1–2	3–0–1	3–1	3–0–1	1–1–2	**11–3–6**
Washington	1–2–1	0–4	0–3–1	1–1–2	1–3	**3–13–4**

**Vs. Norris Division**

1979–80 NHL records
Team	**DET**	**HFD**	**LAK**	**MTL**	**PIT**	**Total**
Atlanta	2–1–1	1–3	2–1–1	0–3–1	1–2–1	**6–10–4**
N.Y. Islanders	1–3	3–1	2–1–1	3–0–1	0–1–3	**9–6–5**
N.Y. Rangers	3–1	2–1–1	3–1	0–3–1	2–2	**10–8–2**
Philadelphia	3–0–1	2–0–2	4–0	1–2–1	3–0–1	**13–2–5**
Washington	1–2–1	2–1–1	3–1	1–2–1	1–3	**8–9–3**

== Schedule and results ==
1979–80 regular season
October

Game	Result	Date	Score	Opponent	Record
1	L	October 11, 1979	3–6	@ Buffalo Sabres (1979–80)	0–1–0
2	L	October 13, 1979	2–5	Boston Bruins (1979–80)	0–2–0
3	W	October 14, 1979	5–3	@ New York Rangers (1979–80)	1–2–0
4	W	October 16, 1979	8–6	Los Angeles Kings (1979–80)	2–2–0
5	L	October 19, 1979	3–5	Toronto Maple Leafs (1979–80)	2–3–0
6	L	October 20, 1979	1–5	@ Pittsburgh Penguins (1979–80)	2–4–0
7	L	October 24, 1979	3–5	@ Los Angeles Kings (1979–80)	2–5–0
8	L	October 27, 1979	3–5	@ Vancouver Canucks (1979–80)	2–6–0
9	W	October 28, 1979	6–4	@ Edmonton Oilers (1979–80)	3–6–0
10	T	October 30, 1979	2–2	Montreal Canadiens (1979–80)	3–6–1

November

Game	Result	Date	Score	Opponent	Record
11	T	November 2, 1979	1–1	@ Winnipeg Jets (1979–80)	3–6–2
12	L	November 3, 1979	1–7	@ Minnesota North Stars (1979–80)	3–7–2
13	L	November 5, 1979	0–2	@ Montreal Canadiens (1979–80)	3–8–2
14	W	November 7, 1979	6–3	Winnipeg Jets (1979–80)	4–8–2
15	L	November 10, 1979	3–5	Buffalo Sabres (1979–80)	4–9–2
16	L	November 13, 1979	3–5	Edmonton Oilers (1979–80)	4–10–2
17	L	November 15, 1979	2–3	@ Boston Bruins (1979–80)	4–11–2
18	L	November 16, 1979	2–4	Detroit Red Wings (1979–80)	4–12–2
19	L	November 18, 1979	2–4	Atlanta Flames (1979–80)	4–13–2
20	T	November 20, 1979	3–3	@ Colorado Rockies (1979–80)	4–13–3
21	L	November 21, 1979	0–4	@ Chicago Black Hawks (1979–80)	4–14–3
22	L	November 24, 1979	1–6	Buffalo Sabres (1979–80)	4–15–3
23	T	November 25, 1979	2–2	@ Quebec Nordiques (1979–80)	4–15–4
24	L	November 28, 1979	2–4	Toronto Maple Leafs (1979–80)	4–16–4

December

Game	Result	Date	Score	Opponent	Record
25	W	December 1, 1979	7–2	Quebec Nordiques (1979–80)	5–16–4
26	L	December 2, 1979	0–2	@ Buffalo Sabres (1979–80)	5–17–4
27	T	December 4, 1979	3–3	Hartford Whalers (1979–80)	5–17–5
28	L	December 7, 1979	3–5	Pittsburgh Penguins (1979–80)	5–18–5
29	L	December 8, 1979	1–5	@ St. Louis Blues (1979–80)	5–19–5
30	L	December 12, 1979	4–5	Minnesota North Stars (1979–80)	5–20–5
31	W	December 15, 1979	5–4	New York Rangers (1979–80)	6–20–5
32	L	December 19, 1979	4–5	@ Hartford Whalers (1979–80)	6–21–5
33	W	December 21, 1979	2–1	Vancouver Canucks (1979–80)	7–21–5
34	L	December 22, 1979	1–2	@ New York Islanders (1979–80)	7–22–5
35	W	December 26, 1979	8–2	@ Toronto Maple Leafs (1979–80)	8–22–5
36	W	December 28, 1979	6–2	Chicago Black Hawks (1979–80)	9–22–5
37	L	December 30, 1979	2–5	@ New York Rangers (1979–80)	9–23–5

January

Game	Result	Date	Score	Opponent	Record
38	W	January 4, 1980	6–3	@ Hartford Whalers (1979–80)	10–23–5
39	T	January 5, 1980	2–2	@ Minnesota North Stars (1979–80)	10–23–6
40	W	January 11, 1980	7–4	Vancouver Canucks (1979–80)	11–23–6
41	L	January 12, 1980	2–5	@ New York Islanders (1979–80)	11–24–6
42	L	January 15, 1980	4–7	@ Philadelphia Flyers (1979–80)	11–25–6
43	L	January 16, 1980	2–5	Edmonton Oilers (1979–80)	11–26–6
44	T	January 19, 1980	4–4	Philadelphia Flyers (1979–80)	11–26–7
45	L	January 20, 1980	2–3	@ Quebec Nordiques (1979–80)	11–27–7
46	W	January 22, 1980	5–4	Winnipeg Jets (1979–80)	12–27–7
47	T	January 26, 1980	1–1	Quebec Nordiques (1979–80)	12–27–8
48	W	January 27, 1980	7–1	New York Islanders (1979–80)	13–27–8
49	L	January 30, 1980	2–5	@ Chicago Black Hawks (1979–80)	13–28–8

February

Game	Result	Date	Score	Opponent	Record
50	L	February 1, 1980	2–4	@ Atlanta Flames (1979–80)	13–29–8
51	L	February 2, 1980	3–6	New York Rangers (1979–80)	13–30–8
52	T	February 6, 1980	2–2	@ Detroit Red Wings (1979–80)	13–30–9
53	W	February 8, 1980	6–3	@ Winnipeg Jets (1979–80)	14–30–9
54	W	February 12, 1980	5–2	@ Los Angeles Kings (1979–80)	15–30–9
55	L	February 15, 1980	2–8	@ Edmonton Oilers (1979–80)	15–31–9
56	W	February 16, 1980	5–3	@ Vancouver Canucks (1979–80)	16–31–9
57	W	February 19, 1980	3–1	Montreal Canadiens (1979–80)	17–31–9
58	L	February 21, 1980	0–3	@ Atlanta Flames (1979–80)	17–32–9
59	W	February 23, 1980	6–2	Chicago Black Hawks (1979–80)	18–32–9
60	T	February 24, 1980	1–1	@ Colorado Rockies (1979–80)	18–32–10
61	W	February 26, 1980	5–3	Los Angeles Kings (1979–80)	19–32–10
62	L	February 28, 1980	1–4	@ Detroit Red Wings (1979–80)	19–33–10

March

Game	Result	Date	Score	Opponent	Record
63	L	March 1, 1980	3–6	@ Montreal Canadiens (1979–80)	19–34–10
64	L	March 2, 1980	1–3	Colorado Rockies (1979–80)	19–35–10
65	W	March 5, 1980	7–5	St. Louis Blues (1979–80)	20–35–10
66	W	March 8, 1980	9–5	Hartford Whalers (1979–80)	21–35–10
67	W	March 9, 1980	3–1	New York Islanders (1979–80)	22–35–10
68	W	March 12, 1980	6–4	Boston Bruins (1979–80)	23–35–10
69	W	March 15, 1980	5–2	Detroit Red Wings (1979–80)	24–35–10
70	T	March 16, 1980	3–3	@ Boston Bruins (1979–80)	24–35–11
71	W	March 18, 1980	4–1	Colorado Rockies (1979–80)	25–35–11
72	L	March 21, 1980	3–4	Minnesota North Stars (1979–80)	25–36–11
73	L	March 22, 1980	2–6	@ St. Louis Blues (1979–80)	25–37–11
74	L	March 24, 1980	1–6	@ Toronto Maple Leafs (1979–80)	25–38–11
75	W	March 26, 1980	4–2	St. Louis Blues (1979–80)	26–38–11
76	T	March 29, 1980	3–3	Philadelphia Flyers (1979–80)	26–38–12
77	L	March 30, 1980	0–4	@ Pittsburgh Penguins (1979–80)	26–39–12

April

Game	Result	Date	Score	Opponent	Record
78	W	April 1, 1980	6–2	Pittsburgh Penguins (1979–80)	27–39–12
79	L	April 3, 1980	2–4	@ Philadelphia Flyers (1979–80)	27–40–12
80	T	April 5, 1980	4–4	Atlanta Flames (1979–80)	27–40–13

Legend: Win (2 points) Loss (0 points) Tie (1 point)

== Player statistics ==
=== Regular season ===
Scoring

Player	Pos	GP	G	A	Pts	PIM	+/-	PPG	SHG	GWG
Mike Gartner	RW	77	36	32	68	66	15	4	0	3
Ryan Walter	C/LW	80	24	42	66	106	-1	12	1	1
Bengt-Ake Gustafsson	RW	80	22	38	60	17	-17	6	1	3
Robert Picard	D	78	11	43	54	122	-21	5	0	1
Rolf Edberg	C	63	23	23	46	12	-5	4	1	7
Paul Mulvey	LW	77	15	19	34	240	-8	2	0	3
Mark Lofthouse	RW/C	68	15	18	33	20	-9	1	0	1
Bob Sirois	RW	49	15	17	32	18	-5	4	1	2
Guy Charron	C	33	11	20	31	6	-2	5	0	1
Dennis Maruk	C	27	10	17	27	8	0	1	1	0
Tom Rowe	RW	41	10	17	27	76	-9	4	0	2
Wes Jarvis	C	63	11	15	26	8	-3	0	0	0
Rick Green	D	71	4	20	24	52	-10	0	0	1
Antero Lehtonen	LW	65	9	12	21	14	-4	2	0	1
Alan Hangsleben	D	37	10	7	17	45	1	2	0	1
Mike Kaszycki	C	28	7	10	17	10	-5	1	0	0
Leif Svensson	D	47	4	11	15	21	-10	0	0	0
Pierre Bouchard	D	54	5	9	14	16	-7	0	0	0
Paul MacKinnon	D	63	1	11	12	22	-1	0	0	0
Errol Rausse	LW	24	6	2	8	0	4	0	0	0
Peter Scamurra	D	23	3	5	8	6	-1	1	0	0
Gord Lane	D	19	2	4	6	53	1	0	0	0
Greg Polis	LW	28	1	5	6	19	-6	0	0	0
Pat Ribble	D	19	1	5	6	30	2	0	0	0
Yvon Labre	D	18	0	5	5	38	3	0	0	0
Tim Coulis	LW	19	1	2	3	27	-6	0	0	0
Glen Currie	C	32	2	0	2	2	-2	0	0	0
Dennis Hextall	LW	15	1	1	2	49	-5	0	0	0
Tony Cassolato	RW	9	0	2	2	0	2	0	0	0
Wayne Stephenson	G	56	0	2	2	20	0	0	0	0
Brent Tremblay	D	9	1	0	1	6	1	0	0	0
Rollie Boutin	G	18	0	1	1	6	0	0	0	0
Gary Rissling	LW	11	0	1	1	49	-6	0	0	0
Greg Theberge	D	12	0	1	1	0	-3	0	0	0
Steve Clippingdale	LW	3	0	0	0	0	0	0	0	0
Bob Girard	LW	1	0	0	0	0	0	0	0	0
Gary Inness	G	14	0	0	0	2	0	0	0	0
Claude Noel	C	7	0	0	0	0	-3	0	0	0
Harvie Pocza	LW	1	0	0	0	0	0	0	0	0

Goaltending

Player	MIN	GP	W	L	T	GA	GAA	SO
Wayne Stephenson	3146	56	18	24	10	187	3.57	0
Rollie Boutin	927	18	7	7	1	54	3.50	0
Gary Inness	727	14	2	9	2	44	3.63	0
Team:	4800	80	27	40	13	285	3.56	0

Note: GP = Games played; G = Goals; A = Assists; Pts = Points; +/- = Plus/minus; PIM = Penalty minutes; PPG=Power-play goals; SHG=Short-handed goals; GWG=Game-winning goals
MIN=Minutes played; W = Wins; L = Losses; T = Ties; GA = Goals against; GAA = Goals against average; SO = Shutouts;

== Draft picks ==
Washington's draft picks at the 1979 NHL entry draft held at the Queen Elizabeth Hotel in Montreal.

Round	#	Player	Nationality	College/Junior/Club team (League)
1	4	Mike Gartner (RW)	Canada	Cincinnati Stingers (WHA)
2	24	Errol Rausse (LW)	Canada	Seattle Breakers (WHL)
4	67	Harvie Pocza (LW)	Canada	Billings Bighorns (WHL)
5	88	Tim Tookey (C)	Canada	Portland Winter Hawks (WHL)
6	109	Greg Theberge (D)	Canada	Peterborough Petes (OMJHL)

== See also ==
- 1979–80 NHL season
