= Tumulty =

Tumulty is a surname of Irish origin. Notable people with the surname include:

- Joseph Tumulty (disambiguation), several people
- Karen Tumulty (born 1955), American journalist
- T. James Tumulty (1913–1981), American politician
- Tom Tumulty (born 1973), American footballer

== See also ==
- Tomalty, surname
