= 1979–80 Chicago Black Hawks season =

National Hockey League team season

1979–80 Chicago Black Hawks
- Smythe Division champions
- Division: 1st Smythe
- Conference: 3rd Campbell
- 1979–80 record: 34–27–19
- Home record: 21–12–7
- Road record: 13–15–12
- Goals for: 241
- Goals against: 250

Team information
- General manager: Bob Pulford
- Coach: Eddie Johnston
- Captain: Keith Magnuson (Oct); Terry Ruskowski (Oct-Apr)
- Alternate captains: None
- Arena: Chicago Stadium
- Average attendance: 11,700 (70.2%)

Team leaders
- Goals: Grant Mulvey (39)
- Assists: Terry Ruskowski (55)
- Points: Terry Ruskowski (70)
- Penalty minutes: Terry Ruskowski (252)
- Plus/minus: Rich Preston (+15)
- Wins: Tony Esposito (31)
- Goals against average: Tony Esposito (2.98)

The 1979–80 Chicago Black Hawks season was the 54th season of operation of the Chicago Black Hawks in the National Hockey League (NHL). The club was coming off a first-place finish in the Smythe Division in the 1978–79, despite finishing with a 29–36–15 record. In the 1979 playoffs, the Black Hawks were swept by the Buffalo Sabres in the quarter-finals.

== Off-season ==
During the off-season, the Black Hawks named Eddie Johnston as their new head coach, as Bob Pulford stepped down to focus on his general manager duties. Johnston was previously the head coach of the New Brunswick Hawks, Chicago's AHL affiliate, in 1978–79, leading the team to a 41–29–10 record. Johnston was also a former goaltender, playing in the NHL from 1962 to 1978, earning a 234–257–80 record with a 3.25 GAA in 592 career games while playing for the Boston Bruins, Toronto Maple Leafs, St. Louis Blues and the Chicago Black Hawks. Johnston won two Stanley Cup championships with the Bruins in 1970 and 1972.

With the NHL expanding to 21 teams, as the Edmonton Oilers, Hartford Whalers, Quebec Nordiques and Winnipeg Jets joined the league from the WHA, the Hawks remained in the Smythe Division, with the Oilers and Jets joining Chicago, Colorado Rockies, St. Louis Blues and Vancouver Canucks to form the only six team division in the league.

At the 1979 NHL expansion draft, Chicago made a deal with the Quebec Nordiques, as the Hawks agreed to not reclaim Real Cloutier from the Nordiques in exchange for Quebec's first-round draft pick in the 1980 NHL entry draft. Prior to the draft, the Hawks reclaimed Bobby Hull and Terry Ruskowski from the Winnipeg Jets and John Garrett from the Hartford Whalers. During the draft, Chicago lost Hull to Winnipeg, Garrett and Jean Savard to the Whalers, Doug Hicks and Reg Thomas to the Edmonton Oilers. The Hawks added Rich Preston from the Jets at the draft.

== Regular season ==
Keith Magnuson retired three games into the season, and was replaced by Terry Ruskowski as team captain.

On October 10, 1979, Chicago beat Edmonton 4–2. This was also the debut of future Hall of Famer Wayne Gretzky.

The Black Hawks had a poor start to the season, as they club had a record of 3-6-3 in their first 12 games. The club continued to struggle, as Chicago won only eight of their first 29 games, going 8–11–10, however, the Hawks were in second place in the Smythe Division, five points behind the first place Vancouver Canucks. The Hawks then went 9-3-2 in their next 14 games, improving their overall record to 17–14–12, charging into first place, five points ahead of the second place St. Louis Blues. Chicago would hold on to first place for the rest of the season, finishing with a 34–27–19 record, earning 87 points, for their third consecutive division title, and eighth in the last eleven seasons.

Offensively, the club was led by Terry Ruskowski, who joined the Black Hawks after being reclaimed in the 1979 NHL expansion draft by the team from the Winnipeg Jets, as he had a team high 70 points, scoring 15 goals and 55 assists. He also led the club with 252 penalty minutes. Tom Lysiak finished second in team scoring with 26 goals and 69 points, while Grant Mulvey had a team high 39 goals, while adding 26 assists for 65 points. Rich Preston also broke the 30 goal plateau, as he had 31 goals and 61 points and had a team best +16 rating. On defence, Doug Wilson led the way with 12 goals and 61 points, while Bob Murray had another excellent season, scoring 16 goals and 50 points.

In goal, Tony Esposito saw the majority of playing time, going 31-22-16 with a 2.97 GAA in 69 games.

=== Final standings ===
Smythe Division
	GP	W	L	T	GF	GA	Pts
**Chicago Black Hawks**	80	34	27	19	241	250	87
**St. Louis Blues**	80	34	34	12	266	278	80
**Vancouver Canucks**	80	27	37	16	256	281	70
**Edmonton Oilers**	80	28	39	13	301	322	69
Winnipeg Jets	80	20	49	11	214	314	51
Colorado Rockies	80	19	48	13	234	308	51

Note: GP = Games played, W = Wins, L = Losses, T = Ties, Pts = Points, GF = Goals for, GA = Goals against
Note: Teams that qualified for the playoffs are highlighted in bold.

League standings
R		Div	GP	W	L	T	GF	GA	Pts
1	**p – Philadelphia Flyers**	PTK	80	48	12	20	327	254	116
2	**y – Buffalo Sabres**	ADM	80	47	17	16	318	201	110
3	**x – Montreal Canadiens**	NRS	80	47	20	13	328	240	107
4	**Boston Bruins**	ADM	80	46	21	13	310	234	105
5	**New York Islanders**	PTK	80	39	28	13	281	247	91
6	**Minnesota North Stars**	ADM	80	36	28	16	311	253	88
7	**x – Chicago Black Hawks**	SMY	80	34	27	19	241	250	87
8	**New York Rangers**	PTK	80	38	32	10	308	284	86
9	**Atlanta Flames**	PTK	80	35	32	13	282	269	83
10	**St. Louis Blues**	SMY	80	34	34	12	266	278	80
11	**Toronto Maple Leafs**	ADM	80	35	40	5	304	327	75
12	**Los Angeles Kings**	NRS	80	30	36	14	290	313	74
13	**Pittsburgh Penguins**	NRS	80	30	37	13	251	303	73
14	**Hartford Whalers**	NRS	80	27	34	19	303	312	73
15	**Vancouver Canucks**	SMY	80	27	37	16	256	281	70
16	**Edmonton Oilers**	SMY	80	28	39	13	301	322	69
17	Washington Capitals	PTK	80	27	40	13	261	293	67
18	Detroit Red Wings	NRS	80	26	43	11	268	306	63
19	Quebec Nordiques	ADM	80	25	44	11	248	313	61
20	Winnipeg Jets	SMY	80	20	49	11	214	314	51
21	Colorado Rockies	SMY	80	19	48	13	234	308	51

Divisions: ADM – Adams, NRS – Norris, PTK – Patrick, SMY – Smythe

bold – The top 16 teams in the league qualified for the playoffs, regardless of division or conference.
x – Won division; y – Won Conference (and division); p – Won Presidents' Trophy (and conference and division)

=== Record vs. opponents ===
Smythe Division record vs. opponents

==== Vs. Campbell Conference ====
**Vs. Smythe Division**

1979–80 NHL records
Team	**CHI**	**COL**	**EDM**	**STL**	**VAN**	**WIN**	**Total**
Chicago	—	3−0−1	1−3	1−2−1	1−1−2	2−2	8−8−4
Colorado	0−3−1	—	2−2	0−2−2	1−2−1	1−2−1	4−11−5
Edmonton	3−1	2−2	—	0−3−1	1−2−1	1−2−1	7−10−3
St. Louis	2−1−1	2−0−2	3−0−1	—	3−1	1−1−2	11−3−6
Vancouver	1−1−2	2−1−1	2−1−1	1−3	—	2−1−1	8−7−5
Winnipeg	2−2	2−1−1	1−2−1	2−2	1−2−1	—	8−9−3

**Vs. Patrick Division**

1979–80 NHL records
Team	**ATL**	**NYI**	**NYR**	**PHI**	**WSH**	**Total**
Chicago	2−0−2	1−2−1	2−1−1	0−2−2	2−2	7−7−6
Colorado	0−4	1−3	1−1−2	1−2−1	1−1−2	4−11−5
Edmonton	1−2−1	2−1−1	1−3	0−3−1	3−1	7−10−3
St. Louis	1−3	1−3	0−4	0−2−2	2−2	4−14−2
Vancouver	2−2	2−1−1	0−4	1−3	1−3	6−13−1
Winnipeg	0−4	0−2−2	2−2	0−4	0−3−1	2−15−3

**Vs. Wales Conference**

**Vs. Adams Division**

1979–80 NHL records
Team	**BOS**	**BUF**	**MIN**	**QUE**	**TOR**	**Total**
Chicago	2−2	1−1−2	2−1−1	2−1−1	4−0	11−5−4
Colorado	1−2−1	1−3	1−3	1−3	0−3−1	4−14−2
Edmonton	0−4	1−2−1	1−1−2	2−2	2−1−1	6−10−4
St. Louis	1−1−2	2−2	1−3	2−2	2−2	8−10−2
Vancouver	0−1−3	0−1−3	2−1−1	2−2	1−3	5−8−7
Winnipeg	1−3	0−3−1	1−2−1	2−2	0−4	4−14−2

**Vs. Norris Division**

1979–80 NHL records
Team	**DET**	**HFD**	**LAK**	**MTL**	**PIT**	**Total**
Chicago	3−1	1−1−2	0−3−1	2−2	2−0−2	8−7−5
Colorado	3−1	1−2−1	0−4	1−3	2−2	7−12−1
Edmonton	1−2−1	1−2−1	2−1−1	1−3	3−1	8−9−3
St. Louis	2−1−1	2−2	3−1	2−2	2−1−1	11−7−2
Vancouver	2−2	1−1−2	2−2	2−2	1−2−1	8−9−3
Winnipeg	1−3	2−2	2−1−1	1−3	0−4	6−13−1

== Playoffs ==
The Black Hawks opened the playoffs with a best-of-five preliminary series against the St. Louis Blues. The Blues finished the season with a 34–34–12 record, earning 80 points and second place in the Smythe Division, seven points behind Chicago. The series opened with two games at Chicago Stadium. The first game would be decided in overtime, after the clubs played to a 2–2 tie after regulation time. In the extra period, the Hawks Doug Lecuyer scored and ended the Black Hawks 16 game playoff game losing streak, as Chicago took the series opener by a 3–2 score. It marked the first time since 1975 that Chicago had won a playoff game. In the second game, the Hawks, led by Doug Wilson and his two goals, easily defeated the Blues 5–1 to take a 2–0 series lead. The series shifted to The Checkerdome in St. Louis, Missouri for the third game, and the Hawks, led by Doug Lecuyer and his two goals, as well as 23 saves by goaltender Tony Esposito, completed the series sweep.

In the NHL quarter-finals, the Black Hawks faced the Buffalo Sabres. Buffalo finished the season with a 47–17–16 record, earning 110 points and first place in the Adams Division. The Sabres then defeated the Vancouver Canucks three games to one in the first round of the playoffs. The series opened with two games at the Buffalo Memorial Auditorium in Buffalo, New York, as the Sabres easily defeated the Black Hawks 5–0 in the series opener, limiting Chicago to only one shot in the first period, and 17 overall. In the second game, the Sabres took an early 2–0 lead in the first period, however, two straight goals by Tom Lysiak tied the game early in the second period. The Sabres then struck for three straight goals before Chicago could answer with one of their own to take a 5–3 lead into the third period. The Black Hawks cut the Sabres lead to 5-4 when Darryl Sutter scored early in the third, however, the Sabres shut down the Hawks, and won the game 6–4 to take a 2–0 series lead. The series moved to Chicago Stadium for the next two games, and in the third game, the Sabres once again scored two early goals in the first period to take a 2–0 lead. Darryl Sutter cut the Sabres lead in half in the second period, as the Hawks made the score 2–1, however, Sabres goaltender Don Edwards made 38 saves, as Buffalo held on for a 2–1 victory, and taking a 3–0 series lead. In the fourth game, the Black Hawks took their first lead in the series when Bob Murray scored midway through the first period to give Chicago a 1–0 lead. Tom Lysiak made it 2-0 Chicago in the second period, however, the Sabres John Van Boxmeer cut the Hawks lead to 2–1 with a goal late in the second period. Buffalo completed the comeback with two unanswered goals in the third period, one by Rick Martin and one by Gilbert Perreault, as the Sabres won the game 3–2, and swept the series.

== Schedule and results ==
=== Regular season ===
1979–80 regular season
October

Game	Result	Date	Score	Opponent	Record
1	W	October 10, 1979	4–2	Edmonton Oilers (1979–80)	1–0–0
2	L	October 13, 1979	1–5	@ Minnesota North Stars (1979–80)	1–1–0
3	T	October 14, 1979	3–3	Hartford Whalers (1979–80)	1–1–1
4	W	October 17, 1979	3–2	Montreal Canadiens (1979–80)	2–1–1
5	T	October 20, 1979	2–2	@ Atlanta Flames (1979–80)	2–1–2
6	L	October 21, 1979	0–3	Quebec Nordiques (1979–80)	2–2–2
7	W	October 24, 1979	4–0	Winnipeg Jets (1979–80)	3–2–2
8	L	October 27, 1979	4–6	@ New York Islanders (1979–80)	3–3–2
9	L	October 28, 1979	1–4	Boston Bruins (1979–80)	3–4–2
10	T	October 31, 1979	0–0	Buffalo Sabres (1979–80)	3–4–3

November

Game	Result	Date	Score	Opponent	Record
11	L	November 3, 1979	0–2	@ Detroit Red Wings (1979–80)	3–5–3
12	L	November 4, 1979	3–5	Los Angeles Kings (1979–80)	3–6–3
13	T	November 8, 1979	3–3	@ Buffalo Sabres (1979–80)	3–6–4
14	W	November 9, 1979	4–2	@ Hartford Whalers (1979–80)	4–6–4
15	T	November 11, 1979	5–5	Hartford Whalers (1979–80)	4–6–5
16	L	November 14, 1979	2–5	Vancouver Canucks (1979–80)	4–7–5
17	W	November 17, 1979	4–1	@ Colorado Rockies (1979–80)	5–7–5
18	T	November 18, 1979	3–3	Minnesota North Stars (1979–80)	5–7–6
19	W	November 21, 1979	4–0	Washington Capitals (1979–80)	6–7–6
20	W	November 24, 1979	2–1	@ Toronto Maple Leafs (1979–80)	7–7–6
21	W	November 25, 1979	6–3	St. Louis Blues (1979–80)	8–7–6
22	L	November 28, 1979	2–4	@ Edmonton Oilers (1979–80)	8–8–6
23	T	November 30, 1979	1–1	@ Vancouver Canucks (1979–80)	8–8–7

December

Game	Result	Date	Score	Opponent	Record
24	L	December 1, 1979	0–7	@ Los Angeles Kings (1979–80)	8–9–7
25	T	December 5, 1979	3–3	@ New York Rangers (1979–80)	8–9–8
26	T	December 8, 1979	3–3	@ Pittsburgh Penguins (1979–80)	8–9–9
27	T	December 9, 1979	4–4	@ Philadelphia Flyers (1979–80)	8–9–10
28	L	December 12, 1979	2–5	New York Rangers (1979–80)	8–10–10
29	L	December 13, 1979	2–5	@ Buffalo Sabres (1979–80)	8–11–10
30	W	December 15, 1979	2–1	@ Boston Bruins (1979–80)	9–11–10
31	W	December 16, 1979	7–3	Detroit Red Wings (1979–80)	10–11–10
32	T	December 19, 1979	0–0	Pittsburgh Penguins (1979–80)	10–11–11
33	L	December 21, 1979	1–4	@ Winnipeg Jets (1979–80)	10–12–11
34	W	December 23, 1979	8–0	New York Islanders (1979–80)	11–12–11
35	T	December 26, 1979	3–3	@ St. Louis Blues (1979–80)	11–12–12
36	L	December 28, 1979	2–6	@ Washington Capitals (1979–80)	11–13–12
37	W	December 30, 1979	5–3	Boston Bruins (1979–80)	12–13–12

January

Game	Result	Date	Score	Opponent	Record
38	W	January 2, 1980	5–2	Colorado Rockies (1979–80)	13–13–12
39	W	January 5, 1980	4–3	@ Montreal Canadiens (1979–80)	14–13–12
40	W	January 6, 1980	3–1	Vancouver Canucks (1979–80)	15–13–12
41	L	January 9, 1980	1–6	Los Angeles Kings (1979–80)	15–14–12
42	W	January 12, 1980	3–2	@ Pittsburgh Penguins (1979–80)	16–14–12
43	W	January 13, 1980	3–2	Detroit Red Wings (1979–80)	17–14–12
44	L	January 16, 1980	1–6	Montreal Canadiens (1979–80)	17–15–12
45	L	January 17, 1980	1–5	@ Philadelphia Flyers (1979–80)	17–16–12
46	L	January 19, 1980	3–5	@ Hartford Whalers (1979–80)	17–17–12
47	W	January 20, 1980	2–1	@ New York Rangers (1979–80)	18–17–12
48	L	January 23, 1980	1–4	Philadelphia Flyers (1979–80)	18–18–12
49	T	January 25, 1980	4–4	@ Atlanta Flames (1979–80)	18–18–13
50	W	January 27, 1980	3–0	Minnesota North Stars (1979–80)	19–18–13
51	W	January 30, 1980	5–2	Washington Capitals (1979–80)	20–18–13

February

Game	Result	Date	Score	Opponent	Record
52	W	February 2, 1980	5–4	@ Toronto Maple Leafs (1979–80)	21–18–13
53	W	February 3, 1980	4–2	Toronto Maple Leafs (1979–80)	22–18–13
54	T	February 6, 1980	3–3	@ Quebec Nordiques (1979–80)	22–18–14
55	L	February 9, 1980	2–5	@ Boston Bruins (1979–80)	22–19–14
56	W	February 10, 1980	3–2	Pittsburgh Penguins (1979–80)	23–19–14
57	W	February 13, 1980	3–1	New York Rangers (1979–80)	24–19–14
58	W	February 17, 1980	3–2	Atlanta Flames (1979–80)	25–19–14
59	W	February 20, 1980	4–2	Toronto Maple Leafs (1979–80)	26–19–14
60	L	February 23, 1980	2–6	@ Washington Capitals (1979–80)	26–20–14
61	W	February 24, 1980	3–1	Buffalo Sabres (1979–80)	27–20–14
62	L	February 27, 1980	2–5	Edmonton Oilers (1979–80)	27–21–14

March

Game	Result	Date	Score	Opponent	Record
63	W	March 1, 1980	4–1	@ Minnesota North Stars (1979–80)	28–21–14
64	W	March 2, 1980	3–2	@ Winnipeg Jets (1979–80)	29–21–14
65	T	March 5, 1980	3–3	@ Vancouver Canucks (1979–80)	29–21–15
66	W	March 7, 1980	4–2	@ Colorado Rockies (1979–80)	30–21–15
67	T	March 8, 1980	3–3	@ Los Angeles Kings (1979–80)	30–21–16
68	T	March 12, 1980	6–6	Philadelphia Flyers (1979–80)	30–21–17
69	L	March 14, 1980	4–6	@ Edmonton Oilers (1979–80)	30–22–17
70	L	March 16, 1980	1–6	New York Islanders (1979–80)	30–23–17
71	W	March 19, 1980	5–2	Quebec Nordiques (1979–80)	31–23–17
72	T	March 22, 1980	4–4	@ New York Islanders (1979–80)	31–23–18
73	W	March 23, 1980	4–2	Atlanta Flames (1979–80)	32–23–18
74	L	March 25, 1980	4–8	@ Montreal Canadiens (1979–80)	32–24–18
75	W	March 26, 1980	7–2	@ Quebec Nordiques (1979–80)	33–24–18
76	T	March 30, 1980	2–2	Colorado Rockies (1979–80)	33–24–19

April

Game	Result	Date	Score	Opponent	Record
77	L	April 1, 1980	2–5	@ St. Louis Blues (1979–80)	33–25–19
78	L	April 2, 1980	2–5	Winnipeg Jets (1979–80)	33–26–19
79	W	April 5, 1980	3–1	@ Detroit Red Wings (1979–80)	34–26–19
80	L	April 6, 1980	4–5	St. Louis Blues (1979–80)	34–27–19

Legend: Win (2 points) Loss (0 points) Tie (1 point)

=== Playoffs ===
1980 Stanley Cup playoffs
Preliminary round vs. (10) St. Louis Blues – Blues win 3–0

Game	Date	Visitor	Score	Home	Series
1	April 8	St. Louis Blues	2–3	Chicago Black Hawks	1–0
2	April 9	St. Louis Blues	1–5	Chicago Black Hawks	2–0
3	April 11	Chicago Black Hawks	4–1	St. Louis Blues	3–0

Quarterfinals vs. (2) Buffalo Sabres – Sabres win 4–0

Game	Date	Visitor	Score	Home	Series
1	April 16	Chicago Black Hawks	0–5	Buffalo Sabres	0–1
2	April 17	Chicago Black Hawks	4–6	Buffalo Sabres	0–2
3	April 19	Buffalo Sabres	2–1	Chicago Black Hawks	0–3
4	April 20	Buffalo Sabres	3–2	Chicago Black Hawks	0–4

Legend: Win Loss

== Player statistics ==
=== Regular season ===
Scoring

Player	Pos	GP	G	A	Pts	PIM	+/-	PPG	SHG	GWG
Terry Ruskowski	C	74	15	55	70	252	7	6	1	3
Tom Lysiak	C	77	26	43	69	31	-7	10	0	7
Grant Mulvey	RW	80	39	26	65	122	3	14	0	7
Rich Preston	RW	80	31	30	61	70	16	12	2	5
Doug Wilson	D	73	12	49	61	70	-5	3	1	1
Bob Murray	D	74	16	34	50	60	-16	8	0	1
Ted Bulley	LW	66	14	17	31	136	-12	1	0	1
Mike O'Connell	D	78	8	22	30	52	-2	2	0	2
Tim Higgins	RW	74	13	12	25	50	-15	2	0	0
Ron Sedlbauer	LW	45	13	10	23	14	1	1	0	0
J. P. Bordeleau	RW	45	7	14	21	28	3	1	0	0
John Marks	LW	74	6	15	21	51	-16	1	0	1
Keith Brown	D	76	2	18	20	27	7	0	0	2
Reg Kerr	LW	49	9	8	17	17	-10	1	1	0
Alain Daigle	RW	66	7	9	16	22	-6	0	1	0
Tim Trimper	LW	30	6	10	16	10	-7	2	0	1
Greg Fox	D	71	4	11	15	73	-13	0	0	1
Doug Lecuyer	LW	53	3	10	13	59	-7	0	0	1
Cliff Koroll	RW	47	3	4	7	6	-10	0	0	0
Stan Mikita	C/RW	17	2	5	7	12	2	0	0	0
Dave Logan	D	12	2	3	5	34	5	0	0	1
Dave Hutchison	D	38	0	5	5	73	0	0	0	0
Pat Ribble	D	23	1	2	3	14	-8	0	0	0
Darryl Sutter	LW	8	2	0	2	2	1	0	0	0
Rick Paterson	C	11	0	2	2	0	0	0	0	0
Tony Esposito	G	69	0	1	1	2	0	0	0	0
Keith Magnuson	D	3	0	0	0	4	0	0	0	0
Harold Phillipoff	LW	9	0	0	0	20	-3	0	0	0
Mike Veisor	G	11	0	0	0	0	0	0	0	0

Goaltending

Player	MIN	GP	W	L	T	GA	GAA	SO
Tony Esposito	4140	69	31	22	16	205	2.97	6
Mike Veisor	660	11	3	5	3	37	3.36	0
Team:	4800	80	34	27	19	242	3.02	6

=== Playoffs ===
Scoring

Player	Pos	GP	G	A	Pts	PIM	PPG	SHG	GWG
Doug Wilson	D	7	2	8	10	6	0	0	0
Tom Lysiak	C	7	4	4	8	0	4	0	0
Bob Murray	D	7	2	4	6	6	0	0	0
Ted Bulley	LW	7	2	3	5	10	0	0	0
Doug Lecuyer	LW	7	4	0	4	15	0	0	1
Darryl Sutter	LW	7	3	1	4	2	2	0	1
Tim Higgins	RW	7	0	3	3	10	0	0	0
Rich Preston	RW	7	0	3	3	2	0	0	0
Grant Mulvey	RW	7	1	1	2	8	0	0	0
Ron Sedlbauer	LW	7	1	1	2	6	1	0	1
Mike O'Connell	D	7	0	1	1	0	0	0	0
J. P. Bordeleau	RW	1	0	0	0	0	0	0	0
Keith Brown	D	6	0	0	0	4	0	0	0
Alain Daigle	RW	2	0	0	0	0	0	0	0
Tony Esposito	G	6	0	0	0	0	0	0	0
Greg Fox	D	7	0	0	0	8	0	0	0
Dave Hutchison	D	6	0	0	0	12	0	0	0
Cliff Koroll	RW	2	0	0	0	2	0	0	0
John Marks	LW	4	0	0	0	0	0	0	0
Rick Paterson	C	7	0	0	0	5	0	0	0
Terry Ruskowski	C	4	0	0	0	22	0	0	0
Tim Trimper	LW	1	0	0	0	2	0	0	0
Mike Veisor	G	1	0	0	0	0	0	0	0

Goaltending

Player	MIN	GP	W	L	GA	GAA	SO
Tony Esposito	373	6	3	3	14	2.25	0
Mike Veisor	60	1	0	1	6	6.00	0
Team:	433	7	3	4	20	2.77	0

Note: Pos = Position; GP = Games played; G = Goals; A = Assists; Pts = Points; +/- = plus/minus; PIM = Penalty minutes; PPG = Power-play goals; SHG = Short-handed goals; GWG = Game-winning goals
MIN = Minutes played; W = Wins; L = Losses; T = Ties; GA = Goals-against; GAA = Goals-against average; SO = Shutouts;

== Draft picks ==
Chicago's draft picks at the 1979 NHL entry draft held at the Queen Elizabeth Hotel in Montreal.

Round	#	Player	Nationality	College/Junior/Club team (League)
1	7	Keith Brown	Canada	Portland Winter Hawks (WHL)
2	28	Tim Trimper	Canada	Peterborough Petes (OMJHL)
3	49	Bill Gardner	Canada	Peterborough Petes (OMJHL)
4	70	Louis Begin	Canada	Sherbrooke Castors (QMJHL)
5	91	Lowell Loveday	Canada	Kingston Canadians (OMJHL)
6	112	Doug Crossman	Canada	Ottawa 67's (OMJHL)

== See also ==
- 1979–80 NHL season
