= 1979–80 Montreal Canadiens season =

NHL hockey team season

1979–80 Montreal Canadiens
- Norris Division champions
- Division: 1st Norris
- Conference: 2nd Wales
- 1979–80 record: 47–20–13
- Home record: 30–7–3
- Road record: 17–13–10
- Goals for: 328
- Goals against: 240

Team information
- General manager: Irving Grundman
- Coach: Bernie Geoffrion (Oct–Dec); Claude Ruel (Dec–Apr)
- Captain: Serge Savard
- Alternate captains: None
- Arena: Montreal Forum

Team leaders
- Goals: Guy Lafleur and Pierre Larouche (50)
- Assists: Guy Lafleur (75)
- Points: Guy Lafleur (125)
- Penalty minutes: Gilles Lupien (109)
- Plus/minus: Larry Robinson (+38)
- Wins: Denis Herron (25)
- Goals against average: Denis Herron (2.51)

The 1979–80 Montreal Canadiens season was the team's 71st season. The Canadiens ended the season with a twenty-game unbeaten streak at the Montreal Forum. By season's end, the franchise was third overall in NHL standings. The season involved being eliminated in the NHL quarter-finals vs the Minnesota North Stars 4 games to 3.

== Offseason ==
- Al MacNeil left his position as head coach of the Canadiens farm club, the Nova Scotia Voyageurs, to become head coach of the Atlanta Flames.
- Jacques Lemaire retired to become a playing coach in Switzerland. In addition, Ken Dryden and captain Yvan Cournoyer also retired from the team.
- Scotty Bowman, upset over the appointment of Irving Grundman as general manager in 1978, left the club to become head coach and general manager of the Buffalo Sabres.
- Boom Boom Geoffrion was hired as head coach in September 1979. In his previous coaching stint, Geoffrion lasted half a season with the 1968–69 New York Rangers. He had to leave the position due to ulcers.
- Veteran defenceman Serge Savard is named team captain.
- The Canadiens did not have a first-round pick in the amateur draft. The club picked Mats Naslund with its second-round choice, 37th overall. The team picked Guy Carbonneau in the third-round, 44th overall.

== Regular season ==
Despite a record of fifteen wins, nine losses and six ties, Geoffrion stepped down as head coach.

=== Final standings ===
Norris Division
	GP	W	L	T	GF	GA	Pts
**Montreal Canadiens**	80	47	20	13	328	240	107
**Los Angeles Kings**	80	30	36	14	290	313	74
**Pittsburgh Penguins**	80	30	37	13	251	303	73
**Hartford Whalers**	80	27	34	19	303	312	73
Detroit Red Wings	80	26	43	11	268	306	63

Note: GP = Games played, W = Wins, L = Losses, T = Ties, Pts = Points, GF = Goals for, GA = Goals against
Note: Teams that qualified for the playoffs are highlighted in bold.

League standings
R		Div	GP	W	L	T	GF	GA	Pts
1	**p – Philadelphia Flyers**	PTK	80	48	12	20	327	254	116
2	**y – Buffalo Sabres**	ADM	80	47	17	16	318	201	110
3	**x – Montreal Canadiens**	NRS	80	47	20	13	328	240	107
4	**Boston Bruins**	ADM	80	46	21	13	310	234	105
5	**New York Islanders**	PTK	80	39	28	13	281	247	91
6	**Minnesota North Stars**	ADM	80	36	28	16	311	253	88
7	**x – Chicago Black Hawks**	SMY	80	34	27	19	241	250	87
8	**New York Rangers**	PTK	80	38	32	10	308	284	86
9	**Atlanta Flames**	PTK	80	35	32	13	282	269	83
10	**St. Louis Blues**	SMY	80	34	34	12	266	278	80
11	**Toronto Maple Leafs**	ADM	80	35	40	5	304	327	75
12	**Los Angeles Kings**	NRS	80	30	36	14	290	313	74
13	**Pittsburgh Penguins**	NRS	80	30	37	13	251	303	73
14	**Hartford Whalers**	NRS	80	27	34	19	303	312	73
15	**Vancouver Canucks**	SMY	80	27	37	16	256	281	70
16	**Edmonton Oilers**	SMY	80	28	39	13	301	322	69
17	Washington Capitals	PTK	80	27	40	13	261	293	67
18	Detroit Red Wings	NRS	80	26	43	11	268	306	63
19	Quebec Nordiques	ADM	80	25	44	11	248	313	61
20	Winnipeg Jets	SMY	80	20	49	11	214	314	51
21	Colorado Rockies	SMY	80	19	48	13	234	308	51

Divisions: ADM – Adams, NRS – Norris, PTK – Patrick, SMY – Smythe

bold – The top 16 teams in the league qualified for the playoffs, regardless of division or conference.
x – Won division; y – Won Conference (and division); p – Won Presidents' Trophy (and conference and division)

=== Record vs. opponents ===
Norris Division record vs. opponents

==== Vs. Wales Conference ====
**Vs. Norris Division**

1979–80 NHL records
Team	**DET**	**HFD**	**LAK**	**MTL**	**PIT**	**Total**
Detroit	—	1–2–1	0–3–1	0–3–1	2–2	**3–10–3**
Hartford	2–1–1	—	2–1–1	0–1–3	2–1–1	**6–4–6**
Los Angeles	3–0–1	1–2–1	—	0–4	1–1–2	**5–7–4**
Montreal	3–0–1	1–0–3	4–0	—	2–1–1	**10–1–5**
Pittsburgh	2–2	1–2–1	1–1–2	1–2–1	—	**5–7–4**

**Vs. Adams Division**

1979–80 NHL records
Team	**BOS**	**BUF**	**MIN**	**QUE**	**TOR**	**Total**
Detroit	1–2–1	1–3	2–1–1	2–1–1	0–4	**6–11–3**
Hartford	1–2–1	1–3	0–4	1–1–2	2–2	**5–12–3**
Los Angeles	1–2–1	0–3–1	2–0–2	3–1	3–0–1	**9–6–5**
Montreal	3–1	1–1–2	3–1	2–1–1	3–1	**12–5–3**
Pittsburgh	2–2	0–4	1–3	2–2	2–2	**7–13–0**

==== Vs. Campbell Conference ====
**Vs. Patrick Division**

1979–80 NHL records
Team	**ATL**	**NYI**	**NYR**	**PHI**	**WSH**	**Total**
Detroit	1–2–1	3–1	1–3	0–3–1	2–1–1	**7–10–3**
Hartford	3–1	1–3	1–2–1	0–2–2	1–2–1	**6–10–4**
Los Angeles	1–2–1	1–2–1	1–3	0–4	1–3	**4–14–2**
Montreal	3–0–1	0–3–1	3–0–1	2–1–1	2–1–1	**10–5–5**
Pittsburgh	2–1–1	1–0–3	2–2	0–3–1	3–1	**8–7–5**

**Vs. Smythe Division**

1979–80 NHL records
Team	**CHI**	**COL**	**EDM**	**STL**	**VAN**	**WIN**	**Total**
Detroit	1−3	1−3	2−1–1	1−2−1	2−2	3−1	**10−12−2**
Hartford	1–1–2	2−1−1	2–1–1	2–2	1−1−2	2−2	**10−8−6**
Los Angeles	3−0−1	4−0	1−2−1	1−3	2−2	1−2−1	**12−9−3**
Montreal	2−2	3−1	3−1	2−2	2−2	3−1	**15−9−0**
Pittsburgh	0−2–2	2−2	1−3	1−2–1	2−1–1	4−0	**10−10−4**

== Schedule and results ==
1979–80 regular season
October

Game	Result	Date	Score	Opponent	Record
1	W	October 11, 1979	3–1	Atlanta Flames (1979–80)	1–0–0
2	W	October 13, 1979	3–1	Quebec Nordiques (1979–80)	2–0–0
3	L	October 17, 1979	2–3	@ Chicago Black Hawks (1979–80)	2–1–0
4	W	October 20, 1979	5–4	New York Rangers (1979–80)	3–1–0
5	T	October 21, 1979	6–6	@ Philadelphia Flyers (1979–80)	3–1–1
6	W	October 23, 1979	5–3	@ Atlanta Flames (1979–80)	4–1–1
7	W	October 25, 1979	8–5	Pittsburgh Penguins (1979–80)	5–1–1
8	W	October 27, 1979	3–2	Detroit Red Wings (1979–80)	6–1–1
9	L	October 28, 1979	4–5	@ Quebec Nordiques (1979–80)	6–2–1
10	T	October 30, 1979	2–2	@ Washington Capitals (1979–80)	6–2–2

November

Game	Result	Date	Score	Opponent	Record
11	W	November 1, 1979	5–1	Minnesota North Stars (1979–80)	7–2–2
12	L	November 3, 1979	3–5	Philadelphia Flyers (1979–80)	7–3–2
13	W	November 5, 1979	2–0	Washington Capitals (1979–80)	8–3–2
14	T	November 7, 1979	3–3	@ Pittsburgh Penguins (1979–80)	8–3–3
15	L	November 10, 1979	3–5	St. Louis Blues (1979–80)	8–4–3
16	W	November 13, 1979	5–2	@ St. Louis Blues (1979–80)	9–4–3
17	W	November 15, 1979	4–1	@ Colorado Rockies (1979–80)	10–4–3
18	W	November 17, 1979	3–1	@ Los Angeles Kings (1979–80)	11–4–3
19	L	November 18, 1979	2–5	@ Vancouver Canucks (1979–80)	11–5–3
20	W	November 22, 1979	7–0	Winnipeg Jets (1979–80)	12–5–3
21	W	November 24, 1979	3–1	Boston Bruins (1979–80)	13–5–3
22	L	November 25, 1979	2–4	@ Boston Bruins (1979–80)	13–6–3
23	T	November 27, 1979	5–5	@ Detroit Red Wings (1979–80)	13–6–4
24	W	November 29, 1979	3–2	St. Louis Blues (1979–80)	14–6–4

December

Game	Result	Date	Score	Opponent	Record
25	T	December 1, 1979	4–4	Hartford Whalers (1979–80)	14–6–5
26	T	December 3, 1979	3–3	@ New York Rangers (1979–80)	14–6–6
27	L	December 5, 1979	2–3	@ Toronto Maple Leafs (1979–80)	14–7–6
28	W	December 7, 1979	5–2	Los Angeles Kings (1979–80)	15–7–6
29	L	December 9, 1979	5–7	Colorado Rockies (1979–80)	15–8–6
30	L	December 11, 1979	1–4	@ New York Islanders (1979–80)	15–9–6
31	L	December 14, 1979	3–5	@ Edmonton Oilers (1979–80)	15–10–6
32	L	December 15, 1979	2–6	@ Winnipeg Jets (1979–80)	15–11–6
33	L	December 18, 1979	3–5	@ St. Louis Blues (1979–80)	15–12–6
34	L	December 19, 1979	2–5	@ Minnesota North Stars (1979–80)	15–13–6
35	W	December 22, 1979	4–2	Vancouver Canucks (1979–80)	16–13–6
36	W	December 23, 1979	8–4	Toronto Maple Leafs (1979–80)	17–13–6
37	L	December 27, 1979	3–7	New York Islanders (1979–80)	17–14–6
38	W	December 29, 1979	6–3	Buffalo Sabres (1979–80)	18–14–6

January

Game	Result	Date	Score	Opponent	Record
39	L	January 2, 1980	3–5	@ Pittsburgh Penguins (1979–80)	18–15–6
40	L	January 5, 1980	3–4	Chicago Black Hawks (1979–80)	18–16–6
41	W	January 7, 1980	4–3	Edmonton Oilers (1979–80)	19–16–6
42	W	January 9, 1980	5–3	@ Toronto Maple Leafs (1979–80)	20–16–6
43	W	January 12, 1980	4–3	Philadelphia Flyers (1979–80)	21–16–6
44	W	January 14, 1980	3–2	Atlanta Flames (1979–80)	22–16–6
45	W	January 16, 1980	6–1	@ Chicago Black Hawks (1979–80)	23–16–6
46	W	January 19, 1980	7–2	Toronto Maple Leafs (1979–80)	24–16–6
47	L	January 22, 1980	1–2	@ New York Islanders (1979–80)	24–17–6
48	W	January 24, 1980	7–2	@ Hartford Whalers (1979–80)	25–17–6
49	L	January 26, 1980	2–7	Buffalo Sabres (1979–80)	25–18–6
50	W	January 29, 1980	4–3	@ Vancouver Canucks (1979–80)	26–18–6
51	W	January 30, 1980	3–2	@ Colorado Rockies (1979–80)	27–18–6

February

Game	Result	Date	Score	Opponent	Record
52	W	February 2, 1980	5–4	@ Los Angeles Kings (1979–80)	28–18–6
53	W	February 7, 1980	4–3	Colorado Rockies (1979–80)	29–18–6
54	L	February 9, 1980	3–4	Vancouver Canucks (1979–80)	29–19–6
55	W	February 10, 1980	3–2	@ Boston Bruins (1979–80)	30–19–6
56	W	February 14, 1980	5–1	Quebec Nordiques (1979–80)	31–19–6
57	W	February 16, 1980	8–1	Pittsburgh Penguins (1979–80)	32–19–6
58	T	February 17, 1980	2–2	@ Buffalo Sabres (1979–80)	32–19–7
59	L	February 19, 1980	1–3	@ Washington Capitals (1979–80)	32–20–7
60	W	February 21, 1980	3–0	Winnipeg Jets (1979–80)	33–20–7
61	W	February 23, 1980	5–1	Detroit Red Wings (1979–80)	34–20–7
62	T	February 26, 1980	3–3	@ Atlanta Flames (1979–80)	34–20–8
63	W	February 28, 1980	6–3	Minnesota North Stars (1979–80)	35–20–8

March

Game	Result	Date	Score	Opponent	Record
64	W	March 1, 1980	6–3	Washington Capitals (1979–80)	36–20–8
65	W	March 2, 1980	5–1	@ Philadelphia Flyers (1979–80)	37–20–8
66	W	March 6, 1980	5–4	Edmonton Oilers (1979–80)	38–20–8
67	W	March 8, 1980	5–2	New York Rangers (1979–80)	39–20–8
68	W	March 10, 1980	6–3	Los Angeles Kings (1979–80)	40–20–8
69	W	March 12, 1980	4–3	@ Minnesota North Stars (1979–80)	41–20–8
70	W	March 14, 1980	4–3	@ Winnipeg Jets (1979–80)	42–20–8
71	W	March 15, 1980	7–3	@ Edmonton Oilers (1979–80)	43–20–8
72	T	March 19, 1980	5–5	@ Hartford Whalers (1979–80)	43–20–9
73	T	March 22, 1980	5–5	Hartford Whalers (1979–80)	43–20–10
74	W	March 23, 1980	6–1	@ New York Rangers (1979–80)	44–20–10
75	W	March 25, 1980	8–4	Chicago Black Hawks (1979–80)	45–20–10
76	T	March 28, 1980	2–2	New York Islanders (1979–80)	45–20–11
77	T	March 30, 1980	1–1	@ Buffalo Sabres (1979–80)	45–20–12

April

Game	Result	Date	Score	Opponent	Record
78	W	April 2, 1980	7–2	@ Detroit Red Wings (1979–80)	46–20–12
79	W	April 5, 1980	6–1	Boston Bruins (1979–80)	47–20–12
80	T	April 6, 1980	4–4	@ Quebec Nordiques (1979–80)	47–20–13

Legend: Win (2 points) Loss (0 points) Tie (1 point)

== Playoffs ==
The Canadiens swept the Hartford Whalers in the preliminary round 3–0 in games. The Canadiens then faced the Minnesota North Stars in the quarter-final and lost a seven-game series four games to three.

== Player statistics ==
=== Regular season ===
==== Scoring ====
Player	Pos	GP	G	A	Pts	PIM	+/-	PPG	SHG	GWG
Guy Lafleur	RW	74	50	75	125	12	40	15	0	7
Pierre Larouche	C	73	50	41	91	16	36	12	0	7
Steve Shutt	LW	77	47	42	89	34	45	17	0	4
Larry Robinson	D	72	14	61	75	39	38	6	0	3
Pierre Mondou	C	75	30	36	66	12	26	8	0	3
Yvon Lambert	LW	77	21	32	53	23	3	7	0	7
Mark Napier	RW	76	16	33	49	7	11	4	0	1
Rejean Houle	W	60	18	27	45	68	3	2	0	3
Mario Tremblay	RW	77	16	26	42	105	6	0	0	2
Rod Langway	D	77	7	29	36	81	36	0	0	1
Bob Gainey	LW	64	14	19	33	32	-2	4	1	3
Guy Lapointe	D	45	6	20	26	29	-2	0	0	0
Doug Jarvis	C	80	13	11	24	28	-5	0	1	3
Brian Engblom	D	70	3	20	23	43	22	0	0	0
Doug Risebrough	C	44	8	10	18	81	-2	0	0	0
Serge Savard	D	46	5	8	13	18	-2	0	0	1
Rick Chartraw	D/RW	66	5	7	12	35	6	0	0	0
Gaston Gingras	D	34	3	7	10	18	11	2	0	1
Gilles Lupien	D	56	1	7	8	109	13	0	0	1
Danny Geoffrion	RW	32	0	6	6	12	1	0	0	0
Norm Dupont	LW	35	1	3	4	4	2	0	0	0
Michel Larocque	G	39	0	2	2	4	0	0	0	0
Chris Nilan	RW	15	0	2	2	50	-1	0	0	0
Keith Acton	C	2	0	1	1	0	0	0	0	0
Denis Herron	G	34	0	0	0	0	0	0	0	0
Rick Meagher	C	2	0	0	0	0	0	0	0	0
Moe Robinson	D	1	0	0	0	0	0	0	0	0
Richard Sevigny	G	11	0	0	0	4	0	0	0	0

==== Goaltending ====
Player	MIN	GP	W	L	T	GA	GAA	SO
Denis Herron	1909	34	25	3	3	80	2.51	0
Michel Larocque	2259	39	17	13	8	125	3.32	3
Richard Sevigny	632	11	5	4	2	31	2.94	0
Team:	4800	80	47	20	13	236	2.95	3

=== Playoffs ===
==== Scoring ====
Player	Pos	GP	G	A	Pts	PIM	PPG	SHG	GWG
Yvon Lambert	LW	10	8	4	12	4	1	0	1
Mario Tremblay	RW	10	0	11	11	14	0	0	0
Steve Shutt	LW	10	6	3	9	6	2	0	2
Rejean Houle	W	10	4	5	9	12	1	0	0
Doug Jarvis	C	10	4	4	8	2	0	1	0
Mark Napier	RW	10	2	6	8	0	1	0	0
Pierre Larouche	C	9	1	7	8	2	0	0	0
Gaston Gingras	D	10	1	6	7	8	0	0	0
Rod Langway	D	10	3	3	6	2	1	0	0
Brian Engblom	D	10	2	4	6	6	1	0	1
Pierre Mondou	C	4	1	4	5	4	0	0	0
Guy Lafleur	RW	3	3	1	4	0	0	0	0
Rick Chartraw	D/RW	10	2	2	4	0	0	0	0
Larry Robinson	D	10	0	4	4	2	0	0	0
Norm Dupont	LW	8	1	1	2	0	0	0	1
Bob Gainey	LW	10	1	1	2	4	0	0	1
Danny Geoffrion	RW	2	0	0	0	7	0	0	0
Denis Herron	G	5	0	0	0	0	0	0	0
Yvan Joly	RW	1	0	0	0	0	0	0	0
Guy Lapointe	D	2	0	0	0	0	0	0	0
Michel Larocque	G	5	0	0	0	0	0	0	0
Gilles Lupien	D	4	0	0	0	2	0	0	0
Chris Nilan	RW	5	0	0	0	2	0	0	0
Serge Savard	D	2	0	0	0	0	0	0	0

==== Goaltending ====
Player	MIN	GP	W	L	GA	GAA	SO
Michel Larocque	300	5	4	1	11	2.20	1
Denis Herron	300	5	2	3	15	3.00	0
Team:	600	10	6	4	26	2.60	1

Note:

Pos = Position;GP = Games played; G = Goals; A = Assists; Pts = Points; PIM = Penalty minutes; +/- = Plus/minus; PPG = Power-play goals; SHG = Short-handed goals; GWG = Game-winning goals
Pos = Position;GP = Games played; Min, TOI = Minutes played; W = Wins; L = Losses; T,T/OT = Ties; OTL = Overtime losses; GA = Goals-against; GAA = Goals-against average; SO = Shutouts; SA = Shots against; SV = Shots saved;SV% = Save percentage;

== Awards and records ==
Larry Robinson, Norris Trophy

== Draft picks ==
Round	#	Player	Position	Nationality	College/junior/club team (League)
2	27	Gaston Gingras	Defence	Canada	Birmingham Bulls (WHA)
2	37	Mats Naslund	Left wing	Sweden	Brynäs IF (Sweden)
3	43	Craig Levie	Defence	Canada	Edmonton Oil Kings (WHL)
3	44	Guy Carbonneau	Centre	Canada	Chicoutimi Saguenéens (QMJHL)
3	58	Rick Wamsley	Goaltender	Canada	Brantford Alexanders (OMJHL)
4	79	Dave Orleski	Left wing	Canada	New Westminster Bruins (WHL)
5	100	Yvan Joly	Right wing	Canada	Ottawa 67's (OMJHL)
6	121	Greg Moffett	Goaltender	United States	University of New Hampshire (ECAC)

== See also ==
- 1979–80 NHL season
