= 1979–80 Atlanta Flames season =

NHL team season (last season in Atlanta)

1979–80 Atlanta Flames
- Division: 4th Patrick
- Conference: 5th Campbell
- 1979–80 record: 35–32–13
- Home record: 18–15–7
- Road record: 17–17–6
- Goals for: 282
- Goals against: 269

Team information
- General manager: Cliff Fletcher
- Coach: Al MacNeil
- Captain: Jean Pronovost
- Alternate captains: None
- Arena: Omni Coliseum
- Average attendance: 10,016 (66.1%)

Team leaders
- Goals: Kent Nilsson (40)
- Assists: Kent Nilsson (53)
- Points: Kent Nilsson (93)
- Penalty minutes: Willi Plett (231)
- Wins: Dan Bouchard (23)
- Goals against average: Dan Bouchard (3.18)

The 1979–80 Atlanta Flames season was the eighth and final season in Atlanta for the franchise. The franchise was bought and moved to Calgary, Alberta to become the Calgary Flames.

== Offseason ==
- Al MacNeil left his position as head coach of the Canadiens farm club, the Nova Scotia Voyageurs, to become head coach of the Atlanta Flames.
- Boom Boom Geoffrion left his position as a broadcaster with the Flames to become the head coach of the Montreal Canadiens.

== Regular season ==
=== Final standings ===
Patrick Division
	GP	W	L	T	GF	GA	Pts
**Philadelphia Flyers**	80	48	12	20	327	254	116
**New York Islanders**	80	39	28	13	281	247	91
**New York Rangers**	80	38	32	10	308	284	86
**Atlanta Flames**	80	35	32	13	282	269	83
Washington Capitals	80	27	40	13	261	293	67

Note: GP = Games played, W = Wins, L = Losses, T = Ties, Pts = Points, GF = Goals for, GA = Goals against
Note: Teams that qualified for the playoffs are highlighted in bold.

League standings
R		Div	GP	W	L	T	GF	GA	Pts
1	**p – Philadelphia Flyers**	PTK	80	48	12	20	327	254	116
2	**y – Buffalo Sabres**	ADM	80	47	17	16	318	201	110
3	**x – Montreal Canadiens**	NRS	80	47	20	13	328	240	107
4	**Boston Bruins**	ADM	80	46	21	13	310	234	105
5	**New York Islanders**	PTK	80	39	28	13	281	247	91
6	**Minnesota North Stars**	ADM	80	36	28	16	311	253	88
7	**x – Chicago Black Hawks**	SMY	80	34	27	19	241	250	87
8	**New York Rangers**	PTK	80	38	32	10	308	284	86
9	**Atlanta Flames**	PTK	80	35	32	13	282	269	83
10	**St. Louis Blues**	SMY	80	34	34	12	266	278	80
11	**Toronto Maple Leafs**	ADM	80	35	40	5	304	327	75
12	**Los Angeles Kings**	NRS	80	30	36	14	290	313	74
13	**Pittsburgh Penguins**	NRS	80	30	37	13	251	303	73
14	**Hartford Whalers**	NRS	80	27	34	19	303	312	73
15	**Vancouver Canucks**	SMY	80	27	37	16	256	281	70
16	**Edmonton Oilers**	SMY	80	28	39	13	301	322	69
17	Washington Capitals	PTK	80	27	40	13	261	293	67
18	Detroit Red Wings	NRS	80	26	43	11	268	306	63
19	Quebec Nordiques	ADM	80	25	44	11	248	313	61
20	Winnipeg Jets	SMY	80	20	49	11	214	314	51
21	Colorado Rockies	SMY	80	19	48	13	234	308	51

Divisions: ADM – Adams, NRS – Norris, PTK – Patrick, SMY – Smythe

bold – The top 16 teams in the league qualified for the playoffs, regardless of division or conference.
x – Won division; y – Won Conference (and division); p – Won Presidents' Trophy (and conference and division)

=== Record vs. opponents ===
Patrick Division record vs. opponents

==== Vs. Campbell Conference ====
**Vs. Patrick Division**

1979–80 NHL records
Team	**ATL**	**NYI**	**NYR**	**PHI**	**WSH**	**Total**
Atlanta	—	1–3	3–0–1	2–2	3–0–1	**9−5−2**
N.Y. Islanders	3–1	—	2–2	2–2	2–2	**9−7−0**
N.Y. Rangers	0–3–1	2–2	—	1–2–1	2–2	**5−9−2**
Philadelphia	2–2	2–2	2–1–1	—	2–0–2	**8−5−3**
Washington	0–3–1	2–2	2–2	0–2–2	—	**4−9−3**

**Vs. Smythe Division**

1979–80 NHL records
Team	**CHI**	**COL**	**EDM**	**STL**	**VAN**	**WIN**	**Total**
Atlanta	0−2−2	4−0	2−1−1	3−1	2−2	4−0	**15−6−3**
N.Y. Islanders	2−1−1	3−1	1−2−1	3−1	1−2−1	2−0−2	**12−7−5**
N.Y. Rangers	1−2−1	1−1−2	3−1	4−0	4−0	2−2	**15−6−3**
Philadelphia	2–0–2	2–1–1	3–0−1	2−0−2	3−1	4−0	**16−2−6**
Washington	2−2	1−1−2	1−3	2−2	3−1	3−0−1	**12−9−3**

**Vs. Wales Conference**

**Vs. Adams Division**

1979–80 NHL records
Team	**BOS**	**BUF**	**MIN**	**QUE**	**TOR**	**Total**
Atlanta	0–4	0–3–1	1–1–2	3–0–1	1–3	**5–11–4**
N.Y. Islanders	1–3	1–2–1	0–2–2	4–0	3–1	**9–8–3**
N.Y. Rangers	2–2	1–2–1	1–2–1	2–1–1	2–2	**8–9–3**
Philadelphia	1–1–2	3–0–1	3–1	3–0–1	1–1–2	**11–3–6**
Washington	1–2–1	0–4	0–3–1	1–1–2	1–3	**3–13–4**

**Vs. Norris Division**

1979–80 NHL records
Team	**DET**	**HFD**	**LAK**	**MTL**	**PIT**	**Total**
Atlanta	2–1–1	1–3	2–1–1	0–3–1	1–2–1	**6–10–4**
N.Y. Islanders	1–3	3–1	2–1–1	3–0–1	0–1–3	**9–6–5**
N.Y. Rangers	3–1	2–1–1	3–1	0–3–1	2–2	**10–8–2**
Philadelphia	3–0–1	2–0–2	4–0	1–2–1	3–0–1	**13–2–5**
Washington	1–2–1	2–1–1	3–1	1–2–1	1–3	**8–9–3**

== Schedule and results ==
1979–80 regular season
October

Game	Result	Date	Score	Opponent	Record	Attendance
1	W	October 10, 1979	5–3	@ Quebec Nordiques (1979–80)	1–0–0	10,350
2	L	October 11, 1979	1–3	@ Montreal Canadiens (1979–80)	1–1–0	16,106
3	W	October 13, 1979	9–2	Philadelphia Flyers (1979–80)	2–1–0	13,358
4	L	October 16, 1979	1–5	@ New York Islanders (1979–80)	2–2–0	13,914
5	L	October 18, 1979	2–6	@ Philadelphia Flyers (1979–80)	2–3–0	17,077
6	T	October 20, 1979	2–2	Chicago Black Hawks (1979–80)	2–3–1	12,934
7	L	October 23, 1979	3–5	Montreal Canadiens (1979–80)	2–4–1	9,438
8	W	October 26, 1979	7–3	Edmonton Oilers (1979–80)	3–4–1	8,420
9	W	October 27, 1979	3–0	@ St. Louis Blues (1979–80)	4–4–1	12,154
10	W	October 30, 1979	3–1	Colorado Rockies (1979–80)	5–4–1	7,135

November

Game	Result	Date	Score	Opponent	Record	Attendance
11	T	November 2, 1979	4–4	Quebec Nordiques (1979–80)	5–4–2	11,356
12	T	November 3, 1979	3–3	@ Pittsburgh Penguins (1979–80)	5–4–3	8,543
13	W	November 6, 1979	8–0	Winnipeg Jets (1979–80)	6–4–3	7,296
14	W	November 9, 1979	5–2	New York Islanders (1979–80)	7–4–3	14,218
15	L	November 11, 1979	3–6	@ Boston Bruins (1979–80)	7–5–3	13,239
16	L	November 13, 1979	3–5	Vancouver Canucks (1979–80)	7–6–3	7,892
17	L	November 15, 1979	1–5	@ Buffalo Sabres (1979–80)	7–7–3	16,433
18	W	November 16, 1979	4–2	New York Rangers (1979–80)	8–7–3	12,919
19	W	November 18, 1979	4–2	@ Washington Capitals (1979–80)	9–7–3	6,361
20	W	November 21, 1979	4–1	Detroit Red Wings (1979–80)	10–7–3	8,346
21	W	November 23, 1979	4–1	Pittsburgh Penguins (1979–80)	11–7–3	13,081
22	L	November 25, 1979	2–4	@ Hartford Whalers (1979–80)	11–8–3	7,627
23	L	November 27, 1979	3–5	Toronto Maple Leafs (1979–80)	11–9–3	8,394

December

Game	Result	Date	Score	Opponent	Record	Attendance
24	L	December 4, 1979	2–6	Los Angeles Kings (1979–80)	11–10–3	8,290
25	L	December 5, 1979	1–6	@ Buffalo Sabres (1979–80)	11–11–3	16,433
26	L	December 8, 1979	1–4	@ Minnesota North Stars (1979–80)	11–12–3	15,379
27	W	December 9, 1979	5–4	@ Winnipeg Jets (1979–80)	12–12–3	12,579
28	T	December 12, 1979	5–5	@ Edmonton Oilers (1979–80)	12–12–4	15,423
29	W	December 14, 1979	3–2	Minnesota North Stars (1979–80)	13–12–4	8,544
30	L	December 15, 1979	1–8	@ Toronto Maple Leafs (1979–80)	13–13–4	16,485
31	L	December 21, 1979	1–5	St. Louis Blues (1979–80)	13–14–4	8,397
32	W	December 22, 1979	7–3	@ St. Louis Blues (1979–80)	14–14–4	10,207
33	L	December 26, 1979	3–5	Boston Bruins (1979–80)	14–15–4	11,700
34	L	December 28, 1979	2–4	Pittsburgh Penguins (1979–80)	14–16–4	9,133
35	L	December 29, 1979	2–3	@ Pittsburgh Penguins (1979–80)	14–17–4	10,416

January

Game	Result	Date	Score	Opponent	Record	Attendance
36	L	January 4, 1980	3–6	Detroit Red Wings (1979–80)	14–18–4	9,216
37	T	January 6, 1980	5–5	@ New York Rangers (1979–80)	14–18–5	17,415
38	W	January 8, 1980	2–0	Winnipeg Jets (1979–80)	15–18–5	6,138
39	W	January 11, 1980	4–3	Quebec Nordiques (1979–80)	16–18–5	9,246
40	L	January 12, 1980	3–5	@ Boston Bruins (1979–80)	16–19–5	13,376
41	L	January 14, 1980	2–3	@ Montreal Canadiens (1979–80)	16–20–5	16,493
42	W	January 16, 1980	5–3	@ Vancouver Canucks (1979–80)	17–20–5	12,235
43	W	January 17, 1980	4–1	@ Colorado Rockies (1979–80)	18–20–5	7,511
44	W	January 19, 1980	4–2	@ Los Angeles Kings (1979–80)	19–20–5	14,909
45	T	January 21, 1980	3–3	Buffalo Sabres (1979–80)	19–20–6	9,203
46	L	January 22, 1980	2–4	Toronto Maple Leafs (1979–80)	19–21–6	8,004
47	T	January 25, 1980	4–4	Chicago Black Hawks (1979–80)	19–21–7	11,924
48	W	January 26, 1980	4–3	@ Detroit Red Wings (1979–80)	20–21–7	18,806
49	L	January 28, 1980	1–6	@ Hartford Whalers (1979–80)	20–22–7	7,627
50	W	January 30, 1980	4–1	@ Quebec Nordiques (1979–80)	21–22–7	10,776

February

Game	Result	Date	Score	Opponent	Record	Attendance
51	W	February 1, 1980	4–2	Washington Capitals (1979–80)	22–22–7	9,166
52	W	February 2, 1980	5–3	Hartford Whalers (1979–80)	23–22–7	11,040
53	W	February 8, 1980	4–2	@ Edmonton Oilers (1979–80)	24–22–7	15,423
54	W	February 10, 1980	6–1	@ Colorado Rockies (1979–80)	25–22–7	9,864
55	T	February 13, 1980	2–2	@ Detroit Red Wings (1979–80)	25–22–8	12,032
56	T	February 16, 1980	2–2	@ Minnesota North Stars (1979–80)	25–22–9	15,162
57	L	February 17, 1980	2–3	@ Chicago Black Hawks (1979–80)	25–23–9	14,835
58	T	February 19, 1980	4–4	Minnesota North Stars (1979–80)	25–23–10	6,871
59	W	February 21, 1980	3–0	Washington Capitals (1979–80)	26–23–10	6,218
60	L	February 23, 1980	5–6	Hartford Whalers (1979–80)	26–24–10	9,868
61	T	February 26, 1980	3–3	Montreal Canadiens (1979–80)	26–24–11	10,210

March

Game	Result	Date	Score	Opponent	Record	Attendance
62	W	March 1, 1980	4–1	Colorado Rockies (1979–80)	27–24–11	15,156
63	W	March 5, 1980	3–1	@ Los Angeles Kings (1979–80)	28–24–11	9,628
64	W	March 7, 1980	9–3	@ Vancouver Canucks (1979–80)	29–24–11	15,405
65	W	March 9, 1980	5–2	@ Winnipeg Jets (1979–80)	30–24–11	12,412
66	L	March 10, 1980	2–5	Vancouver Canucks (1979–80)	30–25–11	7,875
67	T	March 13, 1980	2–2	Los Angeles Kings (1979–80)	30–25–12	9,253
68	W	March 15, 1980	4–3	Philadelphia Flyers (1979–80)	31–25–12	15,156
69	W	March 17, 1980	5–1	@ Toronto Maple Leafs (1979–80)	32–25–12	16,485
70	L	March 18, 1980	3–6	@ New York Islanders (1979–80)	32–26–12	14,995
71	W	March 20, 1980	8–4	St. Louis Blues (1979–80)	33–26–12	8,446
72	L	March 22, 1980	2–5	Boston Bruins (1979–80)	33–27–12	13,474
73	L	March 23, 1980	2–4	@ Chicago Black Hawks (1979–80)	33–28–12	15,927
74	L	March 25, 1980	4–5	Edmonton Oilers (1979–80)	33–29–12	7,914
75	W	March 28, 1980	4–2	New York Rangers (1979–80)	34–29–12	14,138
76	L	March 30, 1980	2–4	@ Philadelphia Flyers (1979–80)	34–30–12	17,077

April

Game	Result	Date	Score	Opponent	Record	Attendance
77	L	April 1, 1980	2–5	Buffalo Sabres (1979–80)	34–31–12	9,126
78	W	April 2, 1980	7–3	@ New York Rangers (1979–80)	35–31–12	17,415
79	L	April 4, 1980	3–7	New York Islanders (1979–80)	35–32–12	12,168
80	T	April 5, 1980	4–4	@ Washington Capitals (1979–80)	35–32–13	18,130

Legend: Win (2 points) Loss (0 points) Tie (1 point)

== Player statistics ==
=== Skaters ===
Note: GP = Games played; G = Goals; A = Assists; Pts = Points; PIM = Penalty minutes

		Regular season					Playoffs
Player	#	GP	G	A	Pts	PIM	GP	G	A	Pts	PIM
Kent Nilsson	14	80	40	53	98	10	4	0	0	0	2
Guy Chouinard	16	76	31	46	77	22	4	1	3	4	4
Bob MacMillan	11	77	22	39	61	10	4	0	0	0	9
Ken Houston	6	80	23	31	54	100	4	1	1	2	10
Eric Vail	27	77	28	25	53	22	4	3	1	4	2
Paul Reinhart	23	79	9	38	47	31	–	–	–	–	-
Jean Pronovost	9	80	24	19	43	31	4	0	0	0	2
Ivan Boldirev^{‡}	12	52	16	24	40	20	–	–	–	–	-
Phil Russell	3	80	5	31	36	115	4	0	1	1	6
Garry Unger	17/7	79	5	25	30	39	4	0	3	3	2
Willi Plett	25	76	13	19	32	231	4	1	0	1	15
Don Lever^{†}	12	28	14	16	30	4	4	1	1	2	0
Pekka Rautakallio	4	79	5	25	30	18	4	0	1	1	2
Bill Clement	10	64	7	14	21	32	4	0	0	0	4
Bob Murdoch	20	80	5	16	21	48	4	1	1	2	2
Darcy Rota^{‡}	18	44	10	8	18	49	–	–	–	–	-
Paul Henderson	15/19	30	7	6	13	6	4	0	0	0	0
Brad Marsh	5	80	2	9	11	119	4	0	1	1	2
Dave Shand	8	74	3	7	10	104	4	0	1	1	0
Curt Bennett	2	21	1	3	4	0	–	–	–	–	-
Bobby Lalonde^{‡}	7	3	0	1	1	2	–	–	–	–	-
Dan Bouchard	30	53	0	1	1	34	4	0	0	0	2
Bobby Gould	22	1	0	0	0	0	–	–	–	–	-
Earl Ingarfield	21	1	0	0	0	0	2	0	1	1	0
Gord Wappel	24	2	0	0	0	0	2	0	0	0	4
Reggie Lemelin	1	3	0	0	0	0	–	–	–	–	-
Rick Adduono	17	3	0	0	0	2	–	–	–	–	-
Dave Gorman	15	3	0	0	0	0	–	–	–	–	-
Serge Beaudoin	24	3	0	0	0	0	–	–	–	–	-
Jim Craig	1	4	0	0	0	0	–	–	–	–	-
Brad Smith	24	4	0	0	0	4	–	–	–	–	-
Pat Riggin	31	25	0	0	0	0	–	–	–	–	-

^{†}Denotes player spent time with another team before joining Atlanta. Stats reflect time with the Flames only.
^{‡}Traded mid-season.

=== Goaltending ===
Note: GP = Games played; TOI = Time on ice (minutes); W = Wins; L = Losses; OT = Overtime/shootout losses; GA = Goals against; SO = Shutouts; GAA = Goals against average

		Regular season								Playoffs
Player	#	GP	TOI	W	L	T	GA	SO	GAA	GP	TOI	W	L	GA	SO	GAA
Dan Bouchard	30	53	3076	23	19	10	163	2	3.18	4	240	1	3	14	0	3.49
Pat Riggin	31	25	1368	11	9	2	73	0	3.20	–	–	–	–	–	–	-.--
Jim Craig	1	4	206	1	2	1	13	0	3.79	–	–	–	–	–	–	-.--
Reggie Lemelin	1	3	150	0	2	0	15	0	6.00	–	–	–	–	–	–	-.--

== Transactions ==
The Flames were involved in the following transactions during the 1979–80 season.

=== Trades ===
May 24, 1979	To Atlanta Flames Curt Bennett	To St. Louis Blues Bobby Simpson
October 10, 1979	To Atlanta Flames Garry Unger	To St. Louis Blues Ed Kea; Red Laurence; 2nd round pick in 1981 (Hakan Nordin)
October 23, 1979	To Atlanta Flames Future considerations	To Boston Bruins Bobby Lalonde
February 8, 1980	To Atlanta Flames Don Lever; Brad Smith	To Vancouver Canucks Ivan Boldirev; Darcy Rota

=== Free agents ===
Player	Former team
D Pekka Rautakallio	Assat Pori (SM-liiga)
D Serge Beaudoin	Birmingham Bulls (WHA)
RW Dave Gorman	Birmingham Bulls (WHA)
LW Paul Henderson	Birmingham Bulls (WHA)
C Rick Adduono	Birmingham Bulls (WHA)
LW Earl Ingarfield	Lethbridge Broncos (WHL)

Player	New team
G Yves Belanger	Boston Bruins

=== Expansion draft ===
Player	Selected by
LW John Gould	Edmonton Oilers
D Rick Hodgson	Hartford Whalers
C Gene Carr	Winnipeg Jets

== Draft picks ==
Round	Pick	Player	Nationality	College/Junior/Club team
1	12.	Paul Reinhart (D)	Canada	Kitchener Rangers (OHA)
2	23.	Mike Perovich (D)	Canada	Brandon Wheat Kings (WHL)
2	33.	Pat Riggin (G)	Canada	London Knights (OHA)
3	54.	Tim Hunter (RW)	Canada	Seattle Breakers (WHL)
4	75.	Jim Peplinski (RW)	Canada	Toronto Marlboros (OHA)
5	96.	Brad Kempthorne (F)	Canada	Brandon Wheat Kings (WHL)
6	117.	Glenn Johnson (C)	Canada	University of Denver (NCAA)
