= Joseph Tumulty =

Joseph Tumulty may refer to:

- Joseph Patrick Tumulty (1870–1954), American attorney and politician from New Jersey
- Joseph W. Tumulty (1914–1996), American politician from New Jersey
