= Ross Cory =

Canadian ice hockey player

- Born: February 4, 1957 (age 69) Calgary, Alberta, Canada
- Height: 6 ft 2 in (188 cm)
- Weight: 195 lb (88 kg; 13 st 13 lb)
- Position: Defence
- Shot: Left
- Played for: Winnipeg Jets
- NHL draft: Undrafted
- Playing career: 1979–1983

Keith Ross Cory (born February 4, 1957) is a Canadian former professional ice hockey defenceman. He played 51 games in the National Hockey League with the Winnipeg Jets during the 1979–80 and 1980–81 seasons, scoring two goals and ten assists.

== Career statistics ==
=== Regular season and playoffs ===
			Regular season					Playoffs
Season	Team	League	GP	G	A	Pts	PIM	GP	G	A	Pts	PIM
1976–77	University of British Columbia	CIAU	33	7	20	27	54	—	—	—	—	—
1977–78	University of British Columbia	CIAU	39	6	39	45	69	—	—	—	—	—
1978–79	University of British Columbia	CIAU	29	4	20	24	83	—	—	—	—	—
1979–80	Winnipeg Jets	NHL	46	2	9	11	32	—	—	—	—	—
1979–80	Tulsa Oilers	CHL	22	3	16	19	40	—	—	—	—	—
1980–81	Winnipeg Jets	NHL	5	0	1	1	9	—	—	—	—	—
1980–81	Tulsa Oilers	CHL	71	10	46	56	94	8	1	6	7	6
1981–82	Tulsa Oilers	CHL	79	6	41	47	105	—	—	—	—	—
1982–83	ECD Iserlohn	GER	36	6	19	25	38	—	—	—	—	—
CHL totals			172	19	103	122	239	8	1	6	7	6
NHL totals			51	2	10	12	41	—	—	—	—	—
