= Jimmy Mann (ice hockey) =

Canadian ice hockey player (born 1959)

- Born: April 17, 1959 (age 67) Montreal, Quebec, Canada
- Height: 6 ft 0 in (183 cm)
- Weight: 205 lb (93 kg; 14 st 9 lb)
- Position: Right wing
- Shot: Right
- Played for: Winnipeg Jets; Quebec Nordiques; Pittsburgh Penguins
- NHL draft: 19th overall, 1979; Winnipeg Jets
- Playing career: 1979–1989

James Edward Mann (born April 17, 1959) is a Canadian former professional ice hockey player who played 293 games in the National Hockey League. He played for the Winnipeg Jets, Quebec Nordiques and the Pittsburgh Penguins. He makes regular appearances with a program for charity, called Oldtimers Hockey Challenge.

== Early life ==
Mann was born in Montreal, Quebec. As a youth, he played in the 1972 Quebec International Pee-Wee Hockey Tournament with a minor ice hockey team from Verdun, Quebec.

== Career ==
Mann was selected by the Winnipeg Jets in the first round of the 1979 NHL entry draft, this pick was the first pick in franchise history. Mann made a reputation for himself as a brawler collecting 287 penalty minutes during his first NHL season.

Mann was suspended for three games and fined $500 for shoving a linesman, Gord Broseker, while trying to resume a fight with defenseman John Gibson in a game against the Toronto Maple Leafs on December 9, 1981. During a game against the Pittsburgh Penguins on January 13, 1982 Penguins center Paul Gardner cross-checked Jets winger Doug Smail in the face, resulting in an injury. Before the next face-off, Mann attacked Gardner from behind with two punches that broke Gardner's jaw. Mann eventually received a ten-game suspension and a criminal record with a $500 fine before the courts of Manitoba. Mann missed the entire 1986–87 season recovering from abdominal injury originally suffered in December 1984.

== Career statistics ==
=== Regular season and playoffs ===
Bold indicates led league

			Regular season					Playoffs
Season	Team	League	GP	G	A	Pts	PIM	GP	G	A	Pts	PIM
1975–76	Laval National	QMJHL	65	8	9	17	107	—	—	—	—	—
1976–77	Laval National	QMJHL	6	0	2	2	19	—	—	—	—	—
1976–77	Sherbrooke Castors	QMJHL	63	12	12	24	186	17	1	4	5	70
1977–78	Sherbrooke Castors	QMJHL	67	27	54	81	277	7	3	9	12	14
1978–79	Sherbrooke Castors	QMJHL	65	35	47	82	260	12	14	12	26	83
1979–80	Winnipeg Jets	NHL	72	3	5	8	**287**	—	—	—	—	—
1980–81	Winnipeg Jets	NHL	37	3	3	6	105	—	—	—	—	—
1980–81	Tulsa Oilers	CHL	26	4	7	11	175	5	0	0	0	21
1981–82	Winnipeg Jets	NHL	37	3	2	5	79	3	0	0	0	7
1982–83	Winnipeg Jets	NHL	40	0	1	1	73	1	0	0	0	0
1983–84	Sherbrooke Jets	AHL	20	6	3	9	94	—	—	—	—	—
1983–84	Winnipeg Jets	NHL	16	0	1	1	54	—	—	—	—	—
1983–84	Quebec Nordiques	NHL	22	1	1	2	42	3	0	0	0	22
1984–85	Quebec Nordiques	NHL	25	0	4	4	54	13	0	0	0	41
1984–85	Fredericton Express	AHL	13	4	4	8	97	—	—	—	—	—
1985–86	Quebec Nordiques	NHL	35	0	3	3	148	2	0	0	0	19
1987–88	Pittsburgh Penguins	NHL	9	0	0	0	53	—	—	—	—	—
1987–88	Muskegon Lumberjacks	IHL	10	0	2	2	61	—	—	—	—	—
1988–89	Indianapolis Ice	IHL	38	5	10	15	275	—	—	—	—	—
NHL totals			293	10	20	30	895	22	0	0	0	89

== Awards ==
- QMJHL First All-Star Team (1979)

== Transactions ==
- February 6, 1984 – Traded to the Quebec Nordiques by the Winnipeg Jets for Quebec's fifth round choice (Brent Severyn) in 1984 NHL entry draft.
- June 16, 1987 – Signed as a free agent by the Pittsburgh Penguins.

Preceded by Miles Zaharko	Winnipeg Jets first-round draft pick 1979	Succeeded by Dave Babych
