= Harvie Pocza =

Canadian ice hockey player

- Born: September 22, 1959 (age 66) Lethbridge, Alberta, Canada
- Height: 6 ft 2 in (188 cm)
- Weight: 195 lb (88 kg; 13 st 13 lb)
- Position: Left wing
- Shot: Left
- Played for: Washington Capitals
- NHL draft: 67th overall, 1979; Washington Capitals
- Playing career: 1979–1983

Harvie Dwight Pocza (born September 22, 1959) is a Canadian former professional ice hockey player. He played 3 games in the National Hockey League with the Washington Capitals during the 1979–80 and 1981–82 seasons. The rest of his career, which lasted from 1979 to 1983, was spent in the minor leagues. Pocza was drafted 67th overall by the Capitals in the 1979 NHL entry draft.

Harvie is currently the Coach/Manager of the Crushers in the 5 Pin Professional League; the 5PL.

== Career statistics ==
=== Regular season and playoffs ===
			Regular season					Playoffs
Season	Team	League	GP	G	A	Pts	PIM	GP	G	A	Pts	PIM
1975–76	The Pass Red Devils	AJHL	3	1	1	2	2	—	—	—	—	—
1976–77	Pincher Creek Panthers	AJHL	57	23	36	59	187	—	—	—	—	—
1976–77	Calgary Centennials	WCHL	10	4	5	9	9	9	0	0	0	0
1977–78	Billings Bighorns	WCHL	71	34	32	66	168	19	9	11	20	60
1978–79	Billings Bighorns	WHL	72	42	55	97	151	8	1	4	5	8
1979–80	Washington Capitals	NHL	1	0	0	0	0	—	—	—	—	—
1979–80	Port Huron Flags	IHL	13	9	7	16	11	—	—	—	—	—
1979–80	Hershey Bears	AHL	59	13	12	25	28	8	4	3	7	22
1980–81	Hershey Bears	AHL	78	27	18	45	108	10	10	2	12	21
1981–82	Washington Capitals	NHL	2	0	0	0	2	—	—	—	—	—
1981–82	Hershey Bears	AHL	61	29	23	52	116	5	1	1	2	0
1982–83	Hershey Bears	AHL	77	13	29	42	85	5	1	2	3	9
AHL totals			275	82	82	164	337	28	16	8	24	52
NHL totals			3	0	0	0	2	—	—	—	—	—
