= Gerry Rioux =

Canadian ice hockey player

- Born: February 17, 1959 (age 67) Iroquois Falls, Ontario, Canada
- Height: 5 ft 11 in (180 cm)
- Weight: 195 lb (88 kg; 13 st 13 lb)
- Position: Right wing
- Shot: Right
- Played for: Winnipeg Jets
- NHL draft: Undrafted
- Playing career: 1979–1981

Gerard Rioux (born February 17, 1959) is a Canadian former professional ice hockey player. He played eight games in the National Hockey League with the Winnipeg Jets during the 1979–80 season, going scoreless.

== Career statistics ==
=== Regular season and playoffs ===
			Regular season					Playoffs
Season	Team	League	GP	G	A	Pts	PIM	GP	G	A	Pts	PIM
1975–76	North Bay Trappers	OPJAHL	—	—	—	—	—	—	—	—	—	—
1976–77	Sault Ste. Marie Greyhounds	OMJHL	61	5	15	20	126	9	1	0	1	23
1977–78	Sault Ste. Marie Greyhounds	OMJHL	25	0	4	4	28	—	—	—	—	—
1977–78	Niagara Falls Flyers	OMJHL	29	2	5	7	34	—	—	—	—	—
1978–79	Windsor Spitfires	OMJHL	65	11	14	25	195	7	0	3	3	11
1979–80	Winnipeg Jets	NHL	8	0	0	0	0	—	—	—	—	—
1979–80	Tulsa Oilers	CHL	57	9	11	20	172	—	—	—	—	—
1980–81	Tulsa Oilers	CHL	22	2	2	4	48	—	—	—	—	—
1980–81	Fort Wayne Komets	IHL	3	0	1	1	0	—	—	—	—	—
NHL totals			8	0	0	0	6	—	—	—	—	—
