= Mario Giallonardo =

Canadian ice hockey player (born 1957)

- Born: September 23, 1957 (age 67); Toronto, Ontario, Canada
- Height: 5 ft 11 in (180 cm)
- Weight: 201 lb (91 kg; 14 st 5 lb)
- Position: Defence
- Shot: Left
- Played for: Colorado Rockies
- NHL draft: Undrafted
- Playing career: 1977–1982

Mario Giallonardo (born September 23, 1957) is a former professional ice hockey defenceman. He played 23 games in the National Hockey League with the Colorado Rockies between 1979 and 1981.

== Career statistics ==
=== Regular season and playoffs ===
			Regular season					Playoffs
Season	Team	League	GP	G	A	Pts	PIM	GP	G	A	Pts	PIM
1974–75	Markham Waxers	OPJHL	—	—	—	—	—	—	—	—	—	—
1975–76	Union College	NCAA-III	—	—	—	—	—	—	—	—	—	—
1976–77	Union College	NCAA-III	26	5	26	31	—	—	—	—	—	—
1976–77	Windsor Spitfires	OMJHL	5	0	1	1	7	9	1	1	2	25
1977–78	Union College	NCAA-III	—	—	—	—	—	—	—	—	—	—
1977–78	Toledo Goaldiggers	IHL	25	1	6	7	34	17	0	9	9	28
1978–79	Philadelphia Firebirds	AHL	70	1	18	19	100	—	—	—	—	—
1979–80	Fort Worth Texans	CHL	70	8	25	33	105	15	2	4	6	47
1979–80	Colorado Rockies	NHL	8	0	1	1	2	—	—	—	—	—
1980–81	Fort Worth Texans	CHL	57	4	18	22	113	—	—	—	—	—
1980–81	Colorado Rockies	NHL	15	0	2	2	4	—	—	—	—	—
1981–82	Fort Worth Texans	CHL	13	0	4	4	20	—	—	—	—	—
NHL totals			23	0	3	3	6	—	—	—	—	—
