= Glenn Tomalty =

Canadian ice hockey player

- Born: July 23, 1954 (age 71) Lachute, Quebec, Canada
- Height: 6 ft 1 in (185 cm)
- Weight: 203 lb (92 kg; 14 st 7 lb)
- Position: Centre
- Shot: Left
- Played for: Winnipeg Jets
- NHL draft: Undrafted
- Playing career: 1977–1982

Glenn William Tomalty (born July 23, 1954) is a Canadian retired professional ice hockey centre who played in one National Hockey League game for the Winnipeg Jets during the 1979–80 NHL season. His lone game came on November 7, 1979, against the Washington Capitals. The rest of his career, which lasted from 1977 to 1982, was spent in different minor leagues, with one final season playing in Belgium.

Tomalty was born in Lachute, Quebec.

== Career statistics ==
=== Regular season and playoffs ===
			Regular season					Playoffs
Season	Team	League	GP	G	A	Pts	PIM	GP	G	A	Pts	PIM
1975–76	Concordia University	CIAU	—	—	—	—	—	—	—	—	—	—
1976–77	Concordia University	CIAU	—	—	—	—	—	—	—	—	—	—
1977–78	Concordia University	CIAU	—	—	—	—	—	—	—	—	—	—
1977–78	Grand Rapids Owls	IHL	3	0	0	0	5	—	—	—	—	—
1978–79	Cape Cod Freedoms	NEHL	41	24	23	47	51	—	—	—	—	—
1978–79	Utica Mohawks	NEHL	27	9	11	20	16	—	—	—	—	—
1979–80	Dayton Gems	IHL	61	29	32	61	86	—	—	—	—	—
1979–80	Tulsa Oilers	CHL	22	5	2	7	59	3	1	1	2	17
1979–80	Winnipeg Jets	NHL	1	0	0	0	0	—	—	—	—	—
1980–81	Tulsa Oilers	CHL	12	4	2	6	34	—	—	—	—	—
1980–81	Fort Wayne Komets	IHL	67	22	26	48	225	12	4	4	8	21
1981–82	Brussels Royal IHSC	BEL	21	34	52	86	42	—	—	—	—	—
NHL totals			1	0	0	0	0	—	—	—	—	—

== See also ==
- List of players who played only one game in the NHL

== Bibliography ==
- Glenn Tomalty Game Logs 1979–80, National Hockey League, 2020
