= Markham (surname) =

Markham is a surname with strong associations with County Clare, Ireland, where it is an anglicisation of Ó Marcacháin. Notable people with the surname include:

- Sir Albert Hastings Markham (1841–1918), a British explorer, author, and naval officer
- Algernon Augustus Markham (1869–1949), an Anglican bishop
- Sir Arthur Markham, 1st Baronet (1866–1916), British industrialist and MP
- Arthur Markham (cyclist) (c. 1860 – 1917), winner of the first formal cycle race held in Britain
- Bernard Markham (1907–1984), an Anglican Bishop in the third quarter of the 20th Century
- Beryl Markham (1902–1986), a British-born Kenyan writer, pilot and horse trainer
- Bridget Markham (1579–1609), a British courtier
- Sir Clements Markham (1830–1916), a President of the Royal Geographical Society
- Col Markham (1940–2020), an Australian politician
- Curtis Markham (born 1959), an American NASCAR driver in all three top series
- Dale Markham (born 1957), a National Football League player
- David Markham (1913–1983), a British actor
- E. A. Markham (1939–2008), a poet and writer, born in Harris, Montserrat
- Edward Murphy Markham (1877–1950), a United States Army general
- Edwin Markham (1852–1940), an American poet
- Felix Markham (1908–1992), a British historian and Napoleon Bonaparte biographer
- Fish Markham (1924–2000), a South African cricketer
- Frank Markham (1897–1975), a British politician
- Fred L. Markham (1902–1984), an American architect in the early 20th century
- George H. Markham (1837–1920), American politician
- Gervase Markham (c. 1568 – 1637), an English poet and writer
- Griffin Markham (d. aft. 1644), an English soldier
- Harry Markham, an English rugby league footballer of the 1950s
- Henry Markham (1840–1923), a United States Representative and 18th Governor of California
- Henry Vaughan Markham (1897–1946), British civil servant
- Ian Markham (born 1962), an American academic
- J. David Markham (born 1945), American educator and historian
- James Markham Marshall (1764–1848), a United States federal judge
- Jerry Markham, a leading scholar on business organizations and securities regulation in the United States
- John Markham (judge) (died 1479), an English judge and Chief Justice
- John Markham (Royal Navy officer) (1761–1827), a Royal Navy officer during the Napoleonic Wars
- June Markham, a British ice dancer
- Kika Markham (born 1940), a British actress
- Mansfield Markham (1905–1971), a British film producer and director
- Monte Markham (born 1935), an American actor
- Paul Markham (1930–2019), an American lawyer
- Pauline Markham (1847–1919), a singer and burlesque dancer during the period of Civil War in the United States
- Petra Markham (born 1947), a British actress
- Pigmeat Markham (real name Dewey Markham, 1904–1981), an African-American entertainer
- Ray Markham (born 1958), a professional ice hockey player
- Reuben H. Markham (1887–1949), an American journalist
- Richard Markham, an English pianist
- Robert Markham (disambiguation), multiple people
- Rory Markham (born 1982), an American professional mixed martial arts fighter
- Thomas Francis Markham, American Roman Catholic bishop
- Violet Markham (1872–1959), a writer, social reformer and administrator
- William Markham (disambiguation), multiple people

== Fictional characters ==
- Markham (Stargate), a USMC non-commissioned officer played by Joseph May in Stargate Atlantis
- Ben and Stephanie Markham, two characters in the All Saints Australian medical drama series
- Cylla Markham, in the Skullbuster comics series
- Grant Markham, in the Doctor Who novels
- Dame Sally Markham, in British television and radio sketch series Little Britain
- Lieutenant Markham, in Gunga Din
- Ulf Reichstein-Markham, a recurring character from the Man-Kzin Wars series of books
