= 1979–80 New York Rangers season =

NHL hockey team season

1979–80 New York Rangers
- Division: 3rd Patrick
- Conference: 4th Campbell
- 1979–80 record: 38–32–10
- Home record: 22–10–8
- Road record: 16–22–2
- Goals for: 308
- Goals against: 284

Team information
- General manager: Fred Shero
- Coach: Fred Shero
- Captain: Dave Maloney
- Alternate captains: None
- Arena: Madison Square Garden

Team leaders
- Goals: Phil Esposito (34)
- Assists: Don Maloney (48)
- Points: Phil Esposito (78)
- Penalty minutes: Dave Maloney (186)
- Wins: John Davidson (20)
- Goals against average: John Davidson (3.17)

The 1979–80 New York Rangers season was the franchise's 54th season. Fresh off a Stanley Cup Final loss in the first year of Fred Shero as coach, the Rangers qualified for the playoffs once again, but bowed out in the second round to Shero's old team, the Philadelphia Flyers. The team's on- and off-ice activities during this campaign was the subject of Larry Sloman's 1982 book Thin Ice: A Season in Hell with the New York Rangers.

== Regular season ==
=== Season standings ===
Patrick Division
	GP	W	L	T	GF	GA	Pts
**Philadelphia Flyers**	80	48	12	20	327	254	116
**New York Islanders**	80	39	28	13	281	247	91
**New York Rangers**	80	38	32	10	308	284	86
**Atlanta Flames**	80	35	32	13	282	269	83
Washington Capitals	80	27	40	13	261	293	67

Note: GP = Games played, W = Wins, L = Losses, T = Ties, Pts = Points, GF = Goals for, GA = Goals against
Note: Teams that qualified for the playoffs are highlighted in bold.

League standings
R		Div	GP	W	L	T	GF	GA	Pts
1	**p – Philadelphia Flyers**	PTK	80	48	12	20	327	254	116
2	**y – Buffalo Sabres**	ADM	80	47	17	16	318	201	110
3	**x – Montreal Canadiens**	NRS	80	47	20	13	328	240	107
4	**Boston Bruins**	ADM	80	46	21	13	310	234	105
5	**New York Islanders**	PTK	80	39	28	13	281	247	91
6	**Minnesota North Stars**	ADM	80	36	28	16	311	253	88
7	**x – Chicago Black Hawks**	SMY	80	34	27	19	241	250	87
8	**New York Rangers**	PTK	80	38	32	10	308	284	86
9	**Atlanta Flames**	PTK	80	35	32	13	282	269	83
10	**St. Louis Blues**	SMY	80	34	34	12	266	278	80
11	**Toronto Maple Leafs**	ADM	80	35	40	5	304	327	75
12	**Los Angeles Kings**	NRS	80	30	36	14	290	313	74
13	**Pittsburgh Penguins**	NRS	80	30	37	13	251	303	73
14	**Hartford Whalers**	NRS	80	27	34	19	303	312	73
15	**Vancouver Canucks**	SMY	80	27	37	16	256	281	70
16	**Edmonton Oilers**	SMY	80	28	39	13	301	322	69
17	Washington Capitals	PTK	80	27	40	13	261	293	67
18	Detroit Red Wings	NRS	80	26	43	11	268	306	63
19	Quebec Nordiques	ADM	80	25	44	11	248	313	61
20	Winnipeg Jets	SMY	80	20	49	11	214	314	51
21	Colorado Rockies	SMY	80	19	48	13	234	308	51

Divisions: ADM – Adams, NRS – Norris, PTK – Patrick, SMY – Smythe

bold – The top 16 teams in the league qualified for the playoffs, regardless of division or conference.
x – Won division; y – Won Conference (and division); p – Won Presidents' Trophy (and conference and division)

=== Record vs. opponents ===
Patrick Division record vs. opponents

==== Vs. Campbell Conference ====
**Vs. Patrick Division**

1979–80 NHL records
Team	**ATL**	**NYI**	**NYR**	**PHI**	**WSH**	**Total**
Atlanta	—	1–3	3–0–1	2–2	3–0–1	**9−5−2**
N.Y. Islanders	3–1	—	2–2	2–2	2–2	**9−7−0**
N.Y. Rangers	0–3–1	2–2	—	1–2–1	2–2	**5−9−2**
Philadelphia	2–2	2–2	2–1–1	—	2–0–2	**8−5−3**
Washington	0–3–1	2–2	2–2	0–2–2	—	**4−9−3**

**Vs. Smythe Division**

1979–80 NHL records
Team	**CHI**	**COL**	**EDM**	**STL**	**VAN**	**WIN**	**Total**
Atlanta	0−2−2	4−0	2−1−1	3−1	2−2	4−0	**15−6−3**
N.Y. Islanders	2−1−1	3−1	1−2−1	3−1	1−2−1	2−0−2	**12−7−5**
N.Y. Rangers	1−2−1	1−1−2	3−1	4−0	4−0	2−2	**15−6−3**
Philadelphia	2–0–2	2–1–1	3–0−1	2−0−2	3−1	4−0	**16−2−6**
Washington	2−2	1−1−2	1−3	2−2	3−1	3−0−1	**12−9−3**

**Vs. Wales Conference**

**Vs. Adams Division**

1979–80 NHL records
Team	**BOS**	**BUF**	**MIN**	**QUE**	**TOR**	**Total**
Atlanta	0–4	0–3–1	1–1–2	3–0–1	1–3	**5–11–4**
N.Y. Islanders	1–3	1–2–1	0–2–2	4–0	3–1	**9–8–3**
N.Y. Rangers	2–2	1–2–1	1–2–1	2–1–1	2–2	**8–9–3**
Philadelphia	1–1–2	3–0–1	3–1	3–0–1	1–1–2	**11–3–6**
Washington	1–2–1	0–4	0–3–1	1–1–2	1–3	**3–13–4**

**Vs. Norris Division**

1979–80 NHL records
Team	**DET**	**HFD**	**LAK**	**MTL**	**PIT**	**Total**
Atlanta	2–1–1	1–3	2–1–1	0–3–1	1–2–1	**6–10–4**
N.Y. Islanders	1–3	3–1	2–1–1	3–0–1	0–1–3	**9–6–5**
N.Y. Rangers	3–1	2–1–1	3–1	0–3–1	2–2	**10–8–2**
Philadelphia	3–0–1	2–0–2	4–0	1–2–1	3–0–1	**13–2–5**
Washington	1–2–1	2–1–1	3–1	1–2–1	1–3	**8–9–3**

== Schedule and results ==
1979–80 regular season
October: 4–4–1 (home: 3–1–1; road: 1–3–0)

Game	October	Opponent	Score	Record
1	10	@ Toronto Maple Leafs	6 – 3	1–0–0
2	14	Washington Capitals	5 – 3	1–1–0
3	18	Vancouver Canucks	6 – 3	2–1–0
4	20	@ Montreal Canadiens	5 – 4	2–2–0
5	21	Pittsburgh Penguins	6 – 3	3–2–0
6	24	Edmonton Oilers	10 – 2	4–2–0
7	25	@ Philadelphia Flyers	5 – 2	4–3–0
8	27	@ Minnesota North Stars	7 – 2	4–4–0
9	28	Hartford Whalers	2 – 2	4–4–1

November: 5–9–1 (home: 4–3–1; road: 1–6–0)

Game	November	Opponent	Score	Record
10	1	@ Los Angeles Kings	4 – 2	4–5–1
11	3	@ Colorado Rockies	7 – 2	4–6–1
12	4	@ Vancouver Canucks	4 – 2	5–6–1
13	7	Los Angeles Kings	8 – 4	6–6–1
14	10	Quebec Nordiques	5 – 4	7–6–1
15	11	Pittsburgh Penguins	4 – 1	7–7–1
16	13	@ New York Islanders	10 – 5	7–8–1
17	14	Detroit Red Wings	3 – 2	8–8–1
18	16	@ Atlanta Flames	4 – 2	8–9–1
19	18	St. Louis Blues	5 – 3	9–9–1
20	21	Winnipeg Jets	6 – 4	9–10–1
21	24	@ Pittsburgh Penguins	5 – 3	9–11–1
22	25	Toronto Maple Leafs	4 – 3	9–12–1
23	28	Minnesota North Stars	4 – 4	9–12–2
24	29	@ Buffalo Sabres	2 – 1	9–13–2

December: 8–2–3 (home: 3–1–3; road: 5–1–0)

Game	December	Opponent	Score	Record
25	1	@ St. Louis Blues	2 – 0	10–13–2
26	3	Montreal Canadiens	3 – 3	10–13–3
27	5	Chicago Black Hawks	3 – 3	10–13–4
28	7	@ Hartford Whalers	7 – 4	11–13–4
29	9	New York Islanders	5 – 4	12–13–4
30	11	@ Detroit Red Wings	2 – 1	13–13–4
31	12	@ Chicago Black Hawks	5 – 2	14–13–4
32	15	@ Washington Capitals	5 – 4	14–14–4
33	16	Philadelphia Flyers	1 – 1	14–14–5
34	19	Vancouver Canucks	5 – 3	15–14–5
35	22	@ Pittsburgh Penguins	4 – 3	16–14–5
36	23	Boston Bruins	4 – 3	16–15–5
37	30	Washington Capitals	5 – 2	17–15–5

January: 6–5–4 (home: 2–2–2; road: 4–3–2)

Game	January	Opponent	Score	Record
38	2	@ Quebec Nordiques	3 – 3	17–15–6
39	4	Philadelphia Flyers	5 – 3	17–16–6
40	6	Atlanta Flames	5 – 5	17–16–7
41	7	Hartford Whalers	5 – 2	18–16–7
42	9	@ Detroit Red Wings	4 – 0	18–17–7
43	11	@ Edmonton Oilers	6 – 2	19–17–7
44	12	@ Winnipeg Jets	3 – 0	20–17–7
45	14	Colorado Rockies	6 – 6	20–17–8
46	16	Winnipeg Jets	4 – 1	21–17–8
47	19	@ Boston Bruins	6 – 3	21–18–8
48	20	Chicago Black Hawks	2 – 1	21–19–8
49	22	@ Los Angeles Kings	5 – 4	22–19–8
50	23	@ Vancouver Canucks	6 – 4	23–19–8
51	27	@ Colorado Rockies	3 – 3	23–19–9
52	31	@ Buffalo Sabres	6 – 2	23–20–9

February: 6–5–0 (home: 4–1–0; road: 2–4–0)

Game	February	Opponent	Score	Record
53	2	@ Washington Capitals	6 – 3	24–20–9
54	3	@ Quebec Nordiques	5 – 4	24–21–9
55	10	Quebec Nordiques	3 – 1	25–21–9
56	13	@ Chicago Black Hawks	3 – 1	25–22–9
57	17	Toronto Maple Leafs	6 – 4	25–23–9
58	18	@ Hartford Whalers	6 – 4	25–24–9
59	20	Edmonton Oilers	4 – 1	26–24–9
60	23	@ Minnesota North Stars	6 – 3	26–25–9
61	24	New York Islanders	8 – 2	27–25–9
62	27	Los Angeles Kings	5 – 4	28–25–9
63	28	@ Boston Bruins	5 – 2	29–25–9

March: 8–5–1 (home: 6–1–1; road: 2–4–0)

Game	March	Opponent	Score	Record
64	2	Boston Bruins	2 – 1	30–25–9
65	5	Buffalo Sabres	4 – 2	31–25–9
66	8	@ Montreal Canadiens	5 – 2	31–26–9
67	9	Minnesota North Stars	4 – 2	32–26–9
68	12	Colorado Rockies	6 – 0	33–26–9
69	15	@ Toronto Maple Leafs	8 – 4	34–26–9
70	16	St. Louis Blues	5 – 2	35–26–9
71	19	@ Edmonton Oilers	4 – 2	35–27–9
72	21	@ Winnipeg Jets	4 – 2	35–28–9
73	23	Montreal Canadiens	6 – 1	35–29–9
74	25	Buffalo Sabres	3 – 3	35–29–10
75	28	@ Atlanta Flames	4 – 2	35–30–10
76	29	@ St. Louis Blues	4 – 3	36–30–10
77	31	Detroit Red Wings	7 – 5	37–30–10

April: 1–2–0 (home: 0–1–0; road: 1–1–0)

Game	April	Opponent	Score	Record
78	2	Atlanta Flames	7 – 3	37–31–10
79	5	@ New York Islanders	2 – 1	37–32–10
80	6	@ Philadelphia Flyers	8 – 3	38–32–10

Legend: Win (2 points) Loss (0 points) Tie (1 point)

== Playoffs ==
1980 Stanley Cup playoffs
Preliminary round vs. (9) Atlanta Flames – Rangers win 3–1

Game	Date	Visitor	Score	Home	OT	Series
1	April 8	Atlanta Flames	1 – 2	New York Rangers	OT	New York Rangers lead series 1-0
2	April 9	Atlanta Flames	1 – 5	New York Rangers		New York Rangers lead series 2-0
3	April 11	New York Rangers	2 – 4	Atlanta Flames		New York Rangers lead series 2-1
4	April 12	New York Rangers	5 – 2	Atlanta Flames		New York Rangers win series 3-1

Quarterfinals vs. (1) Philadelphia Flyers – Flyers win 4–1

Game	Date	Visitor	Score	Home	OT	Series
1	April 16	New York Rangers	1 – 2	Philadelphia Flyers		Philadelphia leads series 1-0
2	April 17	New York Rangers	1 – 4	Philadelphia Flyers		Philadelphia leads series 2-0
3	April 19	Philadelphia Flyers	3 – 0	New York Rangers		Philadelphia leads series 3-0
4	April 20	Philadelphia Flyers	2 – 4	New York Rangers		Philadelphia leads series 3-1
5	April 22	New York Rangers	1 – 3	Philadelphia Flyers		Philadelphia wins series 4-1

Legend: Win Loss

== Player statistics ==
Skaters

Regular season
Player	GP	G	A	Pts	+/-	PIM
Phil Esposito	80	34	44	78	-13	73
Don Maloney	79	25	48	73	-15	97
Anders Hedberg	80	32	39	71	13	21
Steve Vickers	75	29	33	62	20	38
Barry Beck^{†}	61	14	45	59	16	98
Ron Greschner	76	21	37	58	-11	103
Ulf Nilsson	50	14	44	58	15	20
Ron Duguay	73	28	22	50	-6	37
Don Murdoch^{‡}	56	23	19	42	-11	16
Walt Tkaczuk	76	12	25	37	19	36
Dave Maloney	77	12	25	37	10	186
Ed Johnstone	78	14	21	35	3	60
Mario Marois	79	8	23	31	0	142
Dean Talafous	55	10	20	30	1	26
Carol Vadnais	66	3	20	23	-1	118
Warren Miller	55	7	6	13	-6	17
Claude Larose	25	4	7	11	-5	2
Doug Sulliman	31	4	7	11	0	2
Tim Bothwell	45	4	6	10	-3	20
Mike McEwen^{‡}	9	1	7	8	3	8
Jocelyn Guevremont	20	2	5	7	-12	6
Pat Conacher	17	0	5	5	-10	4
Lucien DeBlois^{‡}	6	3	1	4	-1	7
Pat Hickey^{‡}	7	2	2	4	-1	10
Cam Connor^{†}	12	0	3	3	3	37
Ray Markham	14	1	1	2	-3	21
Frank Beaton	23	1	1	2	-5	43
Ed Hospodar	20	0	1	1	-2	76
Andre Dore	2	0	0	0	-1	0
Dave Silk	2	0	0	0	1	0
Jim Mayer	4	0	0	0	1	0
Bill Lochead	7	0	0	0	-5	4

Playoffs
Player	GP	G	A	Pts	PIM
Ron Duguay	9	5	2	7	11
Ulf Nilsson	9	0	6	6	2
Ron Greschner	9	0	6	6	10
Phil Esposito	9	3	3	6	8
Barry Beck	9	1	4	5	6
Anders Hedberg	9	3	2	5	7
Steve Vickers	9	2	2	4	4
Don Maloney	9	0	4	4	10
Carol Vadnais	9	1	2	3	6
Dean Talafous	5	1	2	3	9
Dave Maloney	8	2	1	3	8
Mario Marois	9	0	2	2	8
Ed Hospodar	7	1	0	1	42
Ray Markham	7	1	0	1	24
Pat Conacher	3	0	1	1	2
Warren Miller	6	1	0	1	0
Ed Johnstone	9	0	1	1	25
Walt Tkaczuk	7	0	1	1	2
Cam Connor	2	0	0	0	2
Tim Bothwell	9	0	0	0	8

=== Goaltenders ===
Goaltenders

Regular season
Player	GP	TOI	W	L	T	GA	GAA	SO
John Davidson	41	2306	20	15	4	122	3.17	2
Steve Baker	27	1391	9	8	6	79	3.41	1
Wayne Thomas	12	668	4	7	0	44	3.95	0
Doug Soetaert	8	435	5	2	0	33	4.55	0

Playoffs
Player	GP	TOI	W	L	GA	GAA	SO
John Davidson	9	541	4	5	21	2.33	0

^{†}Denotes player spent time with another team before joining Rangers. Stats reflect time with Rangers only.
^{‡}Traded mid-season. Stats reflect time with Rangers only.

Note:

Pos = Position;GP = Games played; G = Goals; A = Assists; Pts = Points; PIM = Penalty minutes; +/- = Plus/minus; PPG = Power-play goals; SHG = Short-handed goals; GWG = Game-winning goals
Pos = Position;GP = Games played; Min, TOI = Minutes played; W = Wins; L = Losses; T,T/OT = Ties; OTL = Overtime losses; GA = Goals-against; GAA = Goals-against average; SO = Shutouts; SA = Shots against; SV = Shots saved;SV% = Save percentage;

== Draft picks ==
New York's picks at the 1979 NHL entry draft in Montreal, Canada.

Round	#	Player	Position	Nationality	College/Junior/Club team (League)
1	13	Doug Sulliman	LW	Canada	Kitchener Rangers (OHA)
2	34	Ed Hospodar	D	United States	Ottawa 67's (OHA)
4	76	Pat Conacher	C	Canada	Saskatoon Blades (WCHL)
5	97	Dan Makuch	RW	Canada	Clarkson University (NCAA)
6	118	Stan Adams	C	Canada	Niagara Falls Flyers (OHA)
