= The Civil War: The War That Pitted Brother Against Brother =

American Civil War board wargame

- Designers: Mike Crane
- Illustrators: Terry Shrum
- Publishers: Fresno Gaming Association (FGA)
- Publication: 1991

The Civil War: The War That Pitted Brother Against Brother, also known as Brother vs Brother, is a board wargame published by Fresno Gaming Association (FGA) in 1991 that simulates the American Civil War. Critics were unanimous that the game rules were so badly written and incomplete that the game was unplayable.

== Description ==
The Civil War is a board wargame with 960 double-sided counters and three large hex grid maps scaled at 15 miles (24 km) per hex covering the Eastern United States. The game comes with only one campaign scenario covering the entire war.

In addition to rules for combat and movement of land armies, the rules also include naval warfare, leaders, rail movement, and political events. Each turn covers one week of the war.

== Publication history ==
The Civil War was designed by Mike Crane, and was published as a boxed set by FGA in 1991 with artwork by Terry Shrum.

== Reception ==
In Issue 69 of the French games magazine Casus Belli, Jérôme Discours liked the component quality, but that was about all: "Superb map, beautiful counters and numerous playing aids, which suggest a rich and thrilling game. But this magnificent creature has no brains ... Its rules are bad. Whatever its designer may say, the game has clearly not been tested." Discours pointed out some of the problems, noting that leaders had various leadership ratings, but there were no rules for leadership ratings; and that although there are varying qualities of units — militia, regular troops, etc. — there were no rules for differentiating them. Discours was very upset at FGA's suggestion that various sets of rules — for example, supply rules — would only be available via a subscription to their house magazine. Discours accused FGA of "downright laughing at us when they announce that the supply rules will be the subject of a future article in the in-house magazine. Likewise, players are invited to obtain the publisher's magazine for scenarios." Discours concluded by calling it "an unplayable game, which will only satisfy players who have the time to create their own rules."

Game designer Richard Berg was scathing in his indictment of this game, writing, "Pure and simple, this is A Very Bad Game. Paying money to buy Brother vs Brother is akin to throwing it into a trash bin." Berg concluded with a savage critique, writing, "Brother Against Brother is so worthless and stone-stupid that a career could be spent covering its failures, its ineptitudes, and the unmitigated gall it exudes."

Robert Markham, writing for Volunteers, noted, "The game took away my breath — much the same as did my last asthma attack. I fervently hope I never experience either one again."

In Issue 81 of Fire & Movement, John Kisner commented on the general unplayability of the rules, saying, "There is virtually nothing in the game of The Civil War: The War That Pitted Brother Against Brother that I would leave intact in a second edition."
