= 1979–80 Vancouver Canucks season =

10th season in franchise history

1979–80 Vancouver Canucks
- Division: 3rd Smythe
- Conference: 7th Campbell
- 1979–80 record: 27–37–16
- Home record: 14–17–9
- Road record: 13–20–7
- Goals for: 256
- Goals against: 281

Team information
- General manager: Jake Milford
- Coach: Harry Neale
- Captain: Kevin McCarthy
- Alternate captains: Thomas Gradin; Dennis Kearns; Harold Snepsts; Tiger Williams; Stan Smyl
- Arena: Pacific Coliseum
- Average attendance: 14,293

Team leaders
- Goals: Stan Smyl (31)
- Assists: Stan Smyl (47)
- Points: Stan Smyl (78)
- Penalty minutes: Stan Smyl (204)
- Wins: Glen Hanlon (17)
- Goals against average: Glen Hanlon (3.47)

The 1979–80 Vancouver Canucks season was the team's 10th in the NHL. Stan Smyl led the team in goals, assists, points, and penalty minutes, the last time one player has led his team in all four categories. On October 14, 1979, Wayne Gretzky scored his first NHL goal against Glen Hanlon.

== Regular season ==
=== Final standings ===
Smythe Division
	GP	W	L	T	GF	GA	Pts
**Chicago Black Hawks**	80	34	27	19	241	250	87
**St. Louis Blues**	80	34	34	12	266	278	80
**Vancouver Canucks**	80	27	37	16	256	281	70
**Edmonton Oilers**	80	28	39	13	301	322	69
Winnipeg Jets	80	20	49	11	214	314	51
Colorado Rockies	80	19	48	13	234	308	51

Note: GP = Games played, W = Wins, L = Losses, T = Ties, Pts = Points, GF = Goals for, GA = Goals against
Note: Teams that qualified for the playoffs are highlighted in bold.

League standings
R		Div	GP	W	L	T	GF	GA	Pts
1	**p – Philadelphia Flyers**	PTK	80	48	12	20	327	254	116
2	**y – Buffalo Sabres**	ADM	80	47	17	16	318	201	110
3	**x – Montreal Canadiens**	NRS	80	47	20	13	328	240	107
4	**Boston Bruins**	ADM	80	46	21	13	310	234	105
5	**New York Islanders**	PTK	80	39	28	13	281	247	91
6	**Minnesota North Stars**	ADM	80	36	28	16	311	253	88
7	**x – Chicago Black Hawks**	SMY	80	34	27	19	241	250	87
8	**New York Rangers**	PTK	80	38	32	10	308	284	86
9	**Atlanta Flames**	PTK	80	35	32	13	282	269	83
10	**St. Louis Blues**	SMY	80	34	34	12	266	278	80
11	**Toronto Maple Leafs**	ADM	80	35	40	5	304	327	75
12	**Los Angeles Kings**	NRS	80	30	36	14	290	313	74
13	**Pittsburgh Penguins**	NRS	80	30	37	13	251	303	73
14	**Hartford Whalers**	NRS	80	27	34	19	303	312	73
15	**Vancouver Canucks**	SMY	80	27	37	16	256	281	70
16	**Edmonton Oilers**	SMY	80	28	39	13	301	322	69
17	Washington Capitals	PTK	80	27	40	13	261	293	67
18	Detroit Red Wings	NRS	80	26	43	11	268	306	63
19	Quebec Nordiques	ADM	80	25	44	11	248	313	61
20	Winnipeg Jets	SMY	80	20	49	11	214	314	51
21	Colorado Rockies	SMY	80	19	48	13	234	308	51

Divisions: ADM – Adams, NRS – Norris, PTK – Patrick, SMY – Smythe

bold – The top 16 teams in the league qualified for the playoffs, regardless of division or conference.
x – Won division; y – Won Conference (and division); p – Won Presidents' Trophy (and conference and division)

=== Record vs. opponents ===
Smythe Division record vs. opponents

==== Vs. Campbell Conference ====
**Vs. Smythe Division**

1979–80 NHL records
Team	**CHI**	**COL**	**EDM**	**STL**	**VAN**	**WIN**	**Total**
Chicago	—	3−0−1	1−3	1−2−1	1−1−2	2−2	8−8−4
Colorado	0−3−1	—	2−2	0−2−2	1−2−1	1−2−1	4−11−5
Edmonton	3−1	2−2	—	0−3−1	1−2−1	1−2−1	7−10−3
St. Louis	2−1−1	2−0−2	3−0−1	—	3−1	1−1−2	11−3−6
Vancouver	1−1−2	2−1−1	2−1−1	1−3	—	2−1−1	8−7−5
Winnipeg	2−2	2−1−1	1−2−1	2−2	1−2−1	—	8−9−3

**Vs. Patrick Division**

1979–80 NHL records
Team	**ATL**	**NYI**	**NYR**	**PHI**	**WSH**	**Total**
Chicago	2−0−2	1−2−1	2−1−1	0−2−2	2−2	7−7−6
Colorado	0−4	1−3	1−1−2	1−2−1	1−1−2	4−11−5
Edmonton	1−2−1	2−1−1	1−3	0−3−1	3−1	7−10−3
St. Louis	1−3	1−3	0−4	0−2−2	2−2	4−14−2
Vancouver	2−2	2−1−1	0−4	1−3	1−3	6−13−1
Winnipeg	0−4	0−2−2	2−2	0−4	0−3−1	2−15−3

**Vs. Wales Conference**

**Vs. Adams Division**

1979–80 NHL records
Team	**BOS**	**BUF**	**MIN**	**QUE**	**TOR**	**Total**
Chicago	2−2	1−1−2	2−1−1	2−1−1	4−0	11−5−4
Colorado	1−2−1	1−3	1−3	1−3	0−3−1	4−14−2
Edmonton	0−4	1−2−1	1−1−2	2−2	2−1−1	6−10−4
St. Louis	1−1−2	2−2	1−3	2−2	2−2	8−10−2
Vancouver	0−1−3	0−1−3	2−1−1	2−2	1−3	5−8−7
Winnipeg	1−3	0−3−1	1−2−1	2−2	0−4	4−14−2

**Vs. Norris Division**

1979–80 NHL records
Team	**DET**	**HFD**	**LAK**	**MTL**	**PIT**	**Total**
Chicago	3−1	1−1−2	0−3−1	2−2	2−0−2	8−7−5
Colorado	3−1	1−2−1	0−4	1−3	2−2	7−12−1
Edmonton	1−2−1	1−2−1	2−1−1	1−3	3−1	8−9−3
St. Louis	2−1−1	2−2	3−1	2−2	2−1−1	11−7−2
Vancouver	2−2	1−1−2	2−2	2−2	1−2−1	8−9−3
Winnipeg	1−3	2−2	2−1−1	1−3	0−4	6−13−1

== Schedule and results ==
1979–80 regular season
October

Game	Result	Date	Score	Opponent	Record
1	L	October 9, 1979	2–5	St. Louis Blues (1979–80)	0–1–0
2	W	October 12, 1979	3–1	Detroit Red Wings (1979–80)	1–1–0
3	T	October 14, 1979	4–4	@ Edmonton Oilers (1979–80)	1–1–1
4	W	October 17, 1979	5–1	@ St. Louis Blues (1979–80)	2–1–1
5	L	October 18, 1979	3–6	@ New York Rangers (1979–80)	2–2–1
6	L	October 20, 1979	0–2	@ Toronto Maple Leafs (1979–80)	2–3–1
7	T	October 21, 1979	3–3	@ Buffalo Sabres (1979–80)	2–3–2
8	W	October 24, 1979	5–1	Toronto Maple Leafs (1979–80)	3–3–2
9	W	October 27, 1979	5–3	Washington Capitals (1979–80)	4–3–2
10	T	October 31, 1979	2–2	New York Islanders (1979–80)	4–3–3

November

Game	Result	Date	Score	Opponent	Record
11	T	November 2, 1979	3–3	Boston Bruins (1979–80)	4–3–4
12	L	November 4, 1979	2–4	New York Rangers (1979–80)	4–4–4
13	T	November 6, 1979	7–7	Minnesota North Stars (1979–80)	4–4–5
14	W	November 10, 1979	2–1	@ Detroit Red Wings (1979–80)	5–4–5
15	L	November 11, 1979	4–5	@ Philadelphia Flyers (1979–80)	5–5–5
16	W	November 13, 1979	5–3	@ Atlanta Flames (1979–80)	6–5–5
17	W	November 14, 1979	5–2	@ Chicago Black Hawks (1979–80)	7–5–5
18	W	November 16, 1979	5–2	Pittsburgh Penguins (1979–80)	8–5–5
19	W	November 18, 1979	5–2	Montreal Canadiens (1979–80)	9–5–5
20	L	November 20, 1979	1–5	Los Angeles Kings (1979–80)	9–6–5
21	L	November 23, 1979	2–5	Philadelphia Flyers (1979–80)	9–7–5
22	L	November 24, 1979	3–5	@ Winnipeg Jets (1979–80)	9–8–5
23	W	November 28, 1979	4–2	Winnipeg Jets (1979–80)	10–8–5
24	T	November 30, 1979	1–1	Chicago Black Hawks (1979–80)	10–8–6

December

Game	Result	Date	Score	Opponent	Record
25	L	December 2, 1979	1–3	@ Quebec Nordiques (1979–80)	10–9–6
26	W	December 4, 1979	5–1	@ New York Islanders (1979–80)	11–9–6
27	T	December 5, 1979	3–3	@ Pittsburgh Penguins (1979–80)	11–9–7
28	L	December 8, 1979	1–5	@ Detroit Red Wings (1979–80)	11–10–7
29	L	December 9, 1979	3–5	@ Boston Bruins (1979–80)	11–11–7
30	W	December 11, 1979	5–3	Hartford Whalers (1979–80)	12–11–7
31	W	December 14, 1979	5–3	Colorado Rockies (1979–80)	13–11–7
32	L	December 15, 1979	3–4	@ Los Angeles Kings (1979–80)	13–12–7
33	L	December 19, 1979	3–5	@ New York Rangers (1979–80)	13–13–7
34	L	December 21, 1979	1–2	@ Washington Capitals (1979–80)	13–14–7
35	L	December 22, 1979	2–4	@ Montreal Canadiens (1979–80)	13–15–7
36	L	December 28, 1979	3–5	Edmonton Oilers (1979–80)	13–16–7
37	W	December 29, 1979	6–2	Quebec Nordiques (1979–80)	14–16–7

January

Game	Result	Date	Score	Opponent	Record
38	L	January 3, 1980	2–6	@ St. Louis Blues (1979–80)	14–17–7
39	W	January 4, 1980	4–2	@ Colorado Rockies (1979–80)	15–17–7
40	L	January 6, 1980	1–3	@ Chicago Black Hawks (1979–80)	15–18–7
41	L	January 8, 1980	0–3	@ New York Islanders (1979–80)	15–19–7
42	L	January 9, 1980	2–4	@ Pittsburgh Penguins (1979–80)	15–20–7
43	L	January 11, 1980	4–7	@ Washington Capitals (1979–80)	15–21–7
44	L	January 12, 1980	4–6	@ Toronto Maple Leafs (1979–80)	15–22–7
45	L	January 16, 1980	3–5	Atlanta Flames (1979–80)	15–23–7
46	T	January 18, 1980	2–2	Buffalo Sabres (1979–80)	15–23–8
47	L	January 22, 1980	3–5	Colorado Rockies (1979–80)	15–24–8
48	L	January 23, 1980	4–6	New York Rangers (1979–80)	15–25–8
49	L	January 27, 1980	2–5	Toronto Maple Leafs (1979–80)	15–26–8
50	L	January 29, 1980	3–4	Montreal Canadiens (1979–80)	15–27–8

February

Game	Result	Date	Score	Opponent	Record
51	W	February 2, 1980	5–4	@ Minnesota North Stars (1979–80)	16–27–8
52	L	February 3, 1980	0–3	@ Buffalo Sabres (1979–80)	16–28–8
53	W	February 7, 1980	4–1	@ Philadelphia Flyers (1979–80)	17–28–8
54	W	February 9, 1980	4–3	@ Montreal Canadiens (1979–80)	18–28–8
55	T	February 12, 1980	5–5	@ Hartford Whalers (1979–80)	18–28–9
56	L	February 16, 1980	3–5	Washington Capitals (1979–80)	18–29–9
57	W	February 17, 1980	4–2	New York Islanders (1979–80)	19–29–9
58	L	February 19, 1980	1–3	St. Louis Blues (1979–80)	19–30–9
59	L	February 22, 1980	3–7	Philadelphia Flyers (1979–80)	19–31–9
60	T	February 23, 1980	4–4	Boston Bruins (1979–80)	19–31–10
61	L	February 26, 1980	4–5	@ Minnesota North Stars (1979–80)	19–32–10
62	T	February 29, 1980	3–3	@ Winnipeg Jets (1979–80)	19–32–11

March

Game	Result	Date	Score	Opponent	Record
63	W	March 1, 1980	5–2	@ Edmonton Oilers (1979–80)	20–32–11
64	W	March 4, 1980	2–1	Winnipeg Jets (1979–80)	21–32–11
65	T	March 5, 1980	3–3	Chicago Black Hawks (1979–80)	21–32–12
66	L	March 7, 1980	3–9	Atlanta Flames (1979–80)	21–33–12
67	T	March 9, 1980	4–4	@ Colorado Rockies (1979–80)	21–33–13
68	W	March 10, 1980	5–2	@ Atlanta Flames (1979–80)	22–33–13
69	L	March 13, 1980	1–3	@ Hartford Whalers (1979–80)	22–34–13
70	T	March 15, 1980	2–2	@ Boston Bruins (1979–80)	22–34–14
71	W	March 16, 1980	3–2	@ Quebec Nordiques (1979–80)	23–34–14
72	T	March 19, 1980	3–3	Buffalo Sabres (1979–80)	23–34–15
73	L	March 21, 1980	2–5	Detroit Red Wings (1979–80)	23–35–15
74	L	March 23, 1980	2–6	Quebec Nordiques (1979–80)	23–36–15
75	L	March 25, 1980	2–4	Pittsburgh Penguins (1979–80)	23–37–15
76	T	March 28, 1980	4–4	Hartford Whalers (1979–80)	23–37–16
77	W	March 30, 1980	5–3	Minnesota North Stars (1979–80)	24–37–16

April

Game	Result	Date	Score	Opponent	Record
78	W	April 1, 1980	5–0	Edmonton Oilers (1979–80)	25–37–16
79	W	April 3, 1980	4–2	Los Angeles Kings (1979–80)	26–37–16
80	W	April 5, 1980	5–3	@ Los Angeles Kings (1979–80)	27–37–16

Legend: Win (2 points) Loss (0 points) Tie (1 point)

== Playoffs ==
1980 Stanley Cup playoffs
Preliminary round vs. (2) Buffalo Sabres – Sabres win 3–1

Game	Date	Visitor	Score	Home	OT	Series
1	April 8	Vancouver	1 – 2	Buffalo		Buffalo leads 1–0
2	April 9	Vancouver	0 – 6	Buffalo		Buffalo leads 2–0
3	April 11	Buffalo	4 – 5	Vancouver		Buffalo leads 2–1
4	April 12	Buffalo	3 – 1	Vancouver		Buffalo wins 3–1

Legend: Win Loss

== Draft picks ==
Vancouver's picks at the 1979 NHL entry draft. The draft was held in August 1979 at the Queen Elizabeth Hotel in Montreal, Canada.

Round	#	Player	Nationality	College/Junior/Club team (League)
1	5	Rick Vaive (RW)	Canada	Birmingham Bulls (WHA)
2	26	Brent Ashton (C)	Canada	Saskatoon Blades (WHL)
3	47	Ken Ellacott (G)	Canada	Peterborough Petes (OHA)
4	68	Art Rutland (F)	Canada	Sault Ste. Marie Greyhounds (OHA)
5	89	Dirk Graham (RW)	Canada	Regina Pats (WHL)
6	110	Shane Swan	Canada	Sudbury Wolves (OHA)

== See also ==
- 1979–80 NHL season
