= 1979–80 Boston Bruins season =

NHL team season

1979–80 Boston Bruins
- Division: 2nd Adams
- Conference: 3rd Wales
- 1979–80 record: 46–21–13
- Home record: 27–9–4
- Road record: 19–12–9
- Goals for: 310
- Goals against: 234

Team information
- General manager: Harry Sinden
- Coach: Fred Creighton; Harry Sinden
- Captain: Wayne Cashman
- Alternate captains: None
- Arena: Boston Garden
- Average attendance: 12,365 (84.3%)

Team leaders
- Goals: Rick Middleton, Peter McNab (40)
- Assists: Rick Middleton (52)
- Points: Rick Middleton (92)
- Penalty minutes: Terry O'Reilly (265)
- Wins: Gerry Cheevers (24)
- Goals against average: Gilles Gilbert (2.73)

The 1979–80 Boston Bruins season was the Bruins' 56th season. In the first round of the NHL Draft, the Bruins drafted defenseman Ray Bourque. The Bruins had two coaches during the season, Fred Creighton had a record of 40 wins, 20 losses and 13 ties, while Harry Sinden had 6 wins and 1 loss. The Bruins lost to the eventual Stanley Cup champions for the second season in a row, this time it was the New York Islanders in the second round of the Stanley Cup playoffs.

The last remaining active member of the 1979–80 Boston Bruins was defenseman Ray Bourque, who retired after the 2000–01 season, right after winning the Stanley Cup as a member of the Colorado Avalanche.

== Offseason ==
Don Cherry was fired after the 1978–79 season. Fred Creighton, former coach of the Atlanta Flames was brought in to coach the Bruins.

== Regular season ==
General Manager Harry Sinden fired Coach Creighton with 15 days to go in the regular season despite the Bruins' winning record with Creighton. Sinden, who had coached before, took over coaching duties as well.

=== Divisional standings ===
Adams Division
| | GP | W | L | T | GF | GA | Pts |
|---|---|---|---|---|---|---|---|
| **Buffalo Sabres** | 80 | 47 | 17 | 16 | 318 | 201 | 110 |
| **Boston Bruins** | 80 | 46 | 21 | 13 | 310 | 234 | 105 |
| **Minnesota North Stars** | 80 | 36 | 28 | 16 | 311 | 253 | 88 |
| **Toronto Maple Leafs** | 80 | 35 | 40 | 5 | 304 | 327 | 75 |
| Quebec Nordiques | 80 | 25 | 44 | 11 | 248 | 313 | 61 |

Note: GP = Games played, W = Wins, L = Losses, T = Ties, Pts = Points, GF = Goals for, GA = Goals against
Note: Teams that qualified for the playoffs are highlighted in bold.

League standings
| R | | Div | GP | W | L | T | GF | GA | Pts |
|---|---|---|---|---|---|---|---|---|---|
| 1 | **p – Philadelphia Flyers** | PTK | 80 | 48 | 12 | 20 | 327 | 254 | 116 |
| 2 | **y – Buffalo Sabres** | ADM | 80 | 47 | 17 | 16 | 318 | 201 | 110 |
| 3 | **x – Montreal Canadiens** | NRS | 80 | 47 | 20 | 13 | 328 | 240 | 107 |
| 4 | **Boston Bruins** | ADM | 80 | 46 | 21 | 13 | 310 | 234 | 105 |
| 5 | **New York Islanders** | PTK | 80 | 39 | 28 | 13 | 281 | 247 | 91 |
| 6 | **Minnesota North Stars** | ADM | 80 | 36 | 28 | 16 | 311 | 253 | 88 |
| 7 | **x – Chicago Black Hawks** | SMY | 80 | 34 | 27 | 19 | 241 | 250 | 87 |
| 8 | **New York Rangers** | PTK | 80 | 38 | 32 | 10 | 308 | 284 | 86 |
| 9 | **Atlanta Flames** | PTK | 80 | 35 | 32 | 13 | 282 | 269 | 83 |
| 10 | **St. Louis Blues** | SMY | 80 | 34 | 34 | 12 | 266 | 278 | 80 |
| 11 | **Toronto Maple Leafs** | ADM | 80 | 35 | 40 | 5 | 304 | 327 | 75 |
| 12 | **Los Angeles Kings** | NRS | 80 | 30 | 36 | 14 | 290 | 313 | 74 |
| 13 | **Pittsburgh Penguins** | NRS | 80 | 30 | 37 | 13 | 251 | 303 | 73 |
| 14 | **Hartford Whalers** | NRS | 80 | 27 | 34 | 19 | 303 | 312 | 73 |
| 15 | **Vancouver Canucks** | SMY | 80 | 27 | 37 | 16 | 256 | 281 | 70 |
| 16 | **Edmonton Oilers** | SMY | 80 | 28 | 39 | 13 | 301 | 322 | 69 |
| 17 | Washington Capitals | PTK | 80 | 27 | 40 | 13 | 261 | 293 | 67 |
| 18 | Detroit Red Wings | NRS | 80 | 26 | 43 | 11 | 268 | 306 | 63 |
| 19 | Quebec Nordiques | ADM | 80 | 25 | 44 | 11 | 248 | 313 | 61 |
| 20 | Winnipeg Jets | SMY | 80 | 20 | 49 | 11 | 214 | 314 | 51 |
| 21 | Colorado Rockies | SMY | 80 | 19 | 48 | 13 | 234 | 308 | 51 |

Divisions: ADM – Adams, NRS – Norris, PTK – Patrick, SMY – Smythe

bold – The top 16 teams in the league qualified for the playoffs, regardless of division or conference.
x – Won division; y – Won Conference (and division); p – Won Presidents' Trophy (and conference and division)

=== Record vs. opponents ===
Adams Division record vs. opponents

==== Vs. Wales Conference ====
**Vs. Adams Division**

1979–80 NHL records
| Team | **BOS** | **BUF** | **MIN** | **QUE** | **TOR** | **Total** |
|---|---|---|---|---|---|---|
| Boston | — | 2–1–1 | 2–2 | 4–0 | 4–0 | **12–3–1** |
| Buffalo | 1–2–1 | — | 2–1–1 | 3–1 | 4–0 | **10–4–2** |
| Minnesota | 2–2 | 1–2–1 | — | 2–1–1 | 2–2 | **7–7–2** |
| Quebec | 0–4 | 1–3 | 1–2–1 | — | 3–1 | **5–10–1** |
| Toronto | 0–4 | 0–4 | 2–2 | 1–3 | — | **3–13–0** |

**Vs. Norris Division**

1979–80 NHL records
| Team | **DET** | **HFD** | **LAK** | **MTL** | **PIT** | **Total** |
|---|---|---|---|---|---|---|
| Boston | 2–1–1 | 2–1–1 | 2–1–1 | 1–3 | 2–2 | **9–8–3** |
| Buffalo | 3–1 | 3–1 | 3–0–1 | 1–1–2 | 4–0 | **14–3–3** |
| Minnesota | 1–2–1 | 4–0 | 0–2–2 | 1–3 | 3–1 | **9–8–3** |
| Quebec | 1–2–1 | 1–1–2 | 1–3 | 1–2–1 | 2–2 | **6–10–4** |
| Toronto | 4–0 | 2–2 | 0–3–1 | 1–3 | 2–2 | **9–10–1** |

==== Vs. Campbell Conference ====
**Vs. Patrick Division**

1979–80 NHL records
| Team | **ATL** | **NYI** | **NYR** | **PHI** | **WSH** | **Total** |
|---|---|---|---|---|---|---|
| Boston | 4–0 | 3–1 | 2–2 | 1–1–2 | 2–1–1 | **12–5–3** |
| Buffalo | 3–0–1 | 2–1–1 | 2–1–1 | 0–3–1 | 4–0 | **11–5–4** |
| Minnesota | 1–1–2 | 2–0–2 | 2–1–1 | 1–3 | 3–0–1 | **9–5–6** |
| Quebec | 0–3–1 | 0–4 | 1–2–1 | 0–3–1 | 1–1–2 | **2–13–5** |
| Toronto | 3–1 | 1–3 | 2–2 | 1–1–2 | 3–1 | **10–8–2** |

**Vs. Smythe Division**

1979–80 NHL records
| Team | **CHI** | **COL** | **EDM** | **STL** | **VAN** | **WIN** | **Total** |
|---|---|---|---|---|---|---|---|
| Boston | 2−2 | 2−1−1 | 4−0 | 1−1−2 | 1−0−3 | 3−1 | **13−5−6** |
| Buffalo | 1−1−2 | 3−1 | 2−1−1 | 2−2 | 1−0−3 | 3−0−1 | **12−5−7** |
| Minnesota | 1−2−1 | 3−1 | 1−1−2 | 3−1 | 1−2−1 | 2−1−1 | **11−8−5** |
| Quebec | 1−2−1 | 3−1 | 2−2 | 2−2 | 2−2 | 2−2 | **12−11−1** |
| Toronto | 0−4 | 3−0−1 | 1−2−1 | 2−2 | 3−1 | 4−0 | **13−9−2** |

== Schedule and results ==
1979–80 regular season
October

| Game | Result | Date | Score | Opponent | Record |
|---|---|---|---|---|---|
| 1 | W | October 11, 1979 | 4–0 | Winnipeg Jets (1979–80) | 1–0–0 |
| 2 | W | October 13, 1979 | 5–2 | @ Washington Capitals (1979–80) | 2–0–0 |
| 3 | L | October 14, 1979 | 1–4 | Pittsburgh Penguins (1979–80) | 2–1–0 |
| 4 | W | October 18, 1979 | 3–2 | New York Islanders (1979–80) | 3–1–0 |
| 5 | W | October 20, 1979 | 5–4 | Los Angeles Kings (1979–80) | 4–1–0 |
| 6 | T | October 23, 1979 | 5–5 | @ St. Louis Blues (1979–80) | 4–1–1 |
| 7 | L | October 26, 1979 | 2–3 | @ Winnipeg Jets (1979–80) | 4–2–1 |
| 8 | W | October 28, 1979 | 4–1 | @ Chicago Black Hawks (1979–80) | 5–2–1 |
| 9 | T | October 30, 1979 | 4–4 | @ Los Angeles Kings (1979–80) | 5–2–2 |

November

| Game | Result | Date | Score | Opponent | Record |
|---|---|---|---|---|---|
| 10 | T | November 2, 1979 | 3–3 | @ Vancouver Canucks (1979–80) | 5–2–3 |
| 11 | W | November 4, 1979 | 2–1 | @ Edmonton Oilers (1979–80) | 6–2–3 |
| 12 | W | November 8, 1979 | 4–2 | Edmonton Oilers (1979–80) | 7–2–3 |
| 13 | W | November 10, 1979 | 6–1 | @ Pittsburgh Penguins (1979–80) | 8–2–3 |
| 14 | W | November 11, 1979 | 6–3 | Atlanta Flames (1979–80) | 9–2–3 |
| 15 | W | November 15, 1979 | 3–2 | Washington Capitals (1979–80) | 10–2–3 |
| 16 | W | November 17, 1979 | 2–0 | @ Toronto Maple Leafs (1979–80) | 11–2–3 |
| 17 | W | November 18, 1979 | 5–4 | Hartford Whalers (1979–80) | 12–2–3 |
| 18 | W | November 20, 1979 | 5–3 | @ Quebec Nordiques (1979–80) | 13–2–3 |
| 19 | W | November 22, 1979 | 7–4 | Quebec Nordiques (1979–80) | 14–2–3 |
| 20 | L | November 24, 1979 | 1–3 | @ Montreal Canadiens (1979–80) | 14–3–3 |
| 21 | W | November 25, 1979 | 4–2 | Montreal Canadiens (1979–80) | 15–3–3 |
| 22 | L | November 27, 1979 | 2–5 | Buffalo Sabres (1979–80) | 15–4–3 |

December

| Game | Result | Date | Score | Opponent | Record |
|---|---|---|---|---|---|
| 23 | L | December 1, 1979 | 3–6 | @ Detroit Red Wings (1979–80) | 15–5–3 |
| 24 | L | December 2, 1979 | 3–5 | Colorado Rockies (1979–80) | 15–6–3 |
| 25 | T | December 4, 1979 | 2–2 | @ Philadelphia Flyers (1979–80) | 15–6–4 |
| 26 | L | December 6, 1979 | 3–4 | @ New York Islanders (1979–80) | 15–7–4 |
| 27 | W | December 9, 1979 | 5–3 | Vancouver Canucks (1979–80) | 16–7–4 |
| 28 | T | December 13, 1979 | 6–6 | Detroit Red Wings (1979–80) | 16–7–5 |
| 29 | L | December 15, 1979 | 1–2 | Chicago Black Hawks (1979–80) | 16–8–5 |
| 30 | W | December 16, 1979 | 5–1 | @ Buffalo Sabres (1979–80) | 17–8–5 |
| 31 | W | December 20, 1979 | 10–0 | Toronto Maple Leafs (1979–80) | 18–8–5 |
| 32 | L | December 22, 1979 | 2–5 | Philadelphia Flyers (1979–80) | 18–9–5 |
| 33 | W | December 23, 1979 | 4–3 | @ New York Rangers (1979–80) | 19–9–5 |
| 34 | W | December 26, 1979 | 5–3 | @ Atlanta Flames (1979–80) | 20–9–5 |
| 35 | L | December 30, 1979 | 3–5 | @ Chicago Black Hawks (1979–80) | 20–10–5 |

January

| Game | Result | Date | Score | Opponent | Record |
|---|---|---|---|---|---|
| 36 | L | January 2, 1980 | 1–2 | @ Minnesota North Stars (1979–80) | 20–11–5 |
| 37 | W | January 4, 1980 | 2–1 | @ Winnipeg Jets (1979–80) | 21–11–5 |
| 38 | T | January 8, 1980 | 2–2 | @ Colorado Rockies (1979–80) | 21–11–6 |
| 39 | L | January 10, 1980 | 4–7 | St. Louis Blues (1979–80) | 21–12–6 |
| 40 | W | January 12, 1980 | 5–3 | Atlanta Flames (1979–80) | 22–12–6 |
| 41 | W | January 13, 1980 | 6–2 | Colorado Rockies (1979–80) | 23–12–6 |
| 42 | W | January 16, 1980 | 3–1 | @ Quebec Nordiques (1979–80) | 24–12–6 |
| 43 | W | January 17, 1980 | 7–1 | Edmonton Oilers (1979–80) | 25–12–6 |
| 44 | W | January 19, 1980 | 6–3 | New York Rangers (1979–80) | 26–12–6 |
| 45 | W | January 21, 1980 | 3–0 | Minnesota North Stars (1979–80) | 27–12–6 |
| 46 | W | January 24, 1980 | 4–3 | Buffalo Sabres (1979–80) | 28–12–6 |
| 47 | W | January 26, 1980 | 6–4 | @ Pittsburgh Penguins (1979–80) | 29–12–6 |
| 48 | L | January 27, 1980 | 3–5 | Pittsburgh Penguins (1979–80) | 29–13–6 |
| 49 | L | January 30, 1980 | 2–8 | @ Hartford Whalers (1979–80) | 29–14–6 |
| 50 | W | January 31, 1980 | 4–2 | New York Islanders (1979–80) | 30–14–6 |

February

| Game | Result | Date | Score | Opponent | Record |
|---|---|---|---|---|---|
| 51 | W | February 2, 1980 | 7–2 | Quebec Nordiques (1979–80) | 31–14–6 |
| 52 | T | February 3, 1980 | 3–3 | @ Philadelphia Flyers (1979–80) | 31–14–7 |
| 53 | W | February 7, 1980 | 8–6 | Toronto Maple Leafs (1979–80) | 32–14–7 |
| 54 | W | February 9, 1980 | 5–2 | Chicago Black Hawks (1979–80) | 33–14–7 |
| 55 | L | February 10, 1980 | 2–3 | Montreal Canadiens (1979–80) | 33–15–7 |
| 56 | T | February 14, 1980 | 3–3 | @ Buffalo Sabres (1979–80) | 33–15–8 |
| 57 | W | February 16, 1980 | 5–3 | @ Colorado Rockies (1979–80) | 34–15–8 |
| 58 | L | February 20, 1980 | 0–3 | @ Los Angeles Kings (1979–80) | 34–16–8 |
| 59 | T | February 23, 1980 | 4–4 | @ Vancouver Canucks (1979–80) | 34–16–9 |
| 60 | W | February 24, 1980 | 4–2 | @ Edmonton Oilers (1979–80) | 35–16–9 |
| 61 | W | February 27, 1980 | 6–3 | @ Hartford Whalers (1979–80) | 36–16–9 |
| 62 | L | February 28, 1980 | 2–5 | New York Rangers (1979–80) | 36–17–9 |

March

| Game | Result | Date | Score | Opponent | Record |
|---|---|---|---|---|---|
| 63 | W | March 1, 1980 | 4–0 | Los Angeles Kings (1979–80) | 37–17–9 |
| 64 | L | March 2, 1980 | 1–2 | @ New York Rangers (1979–80) | 37–18–9 |
| 65 | W | March 5, 1980 | 5–3 | @ Detroit Red Wings (1979–80) | 38–18–9 |
| 66 | W | March 8, 1980 | 5–3 | @ New York Islanders (1979–80) | 39–18–9 |
| 67 | T | March 9, 1980 | 1–1 | Hartford Whalers (1979–80) | 39–18–10 |
| 68 | L | March 12, 1980 | 4–6 | @ Washington Capitals (1979–80) | 39–19–10 |
| 69 | W | March 13, 1980 | 4–2 | Detroit Red Wings (1979–80) | 40–19–10 |
| 70 | T | March 15, 1980 | 2–2 | Vancouver Canucks (1979–80) | 40–19–11 |
| 71 | T | March 16, 1980 | 3–3 | Washington Capitals (1979–80) | 40–19–12 |
| 72 | T | March 18, 1980 | 3–3 | @ St. Louis Blues (1979–80) | 40–19–13 |
| 73 | L | March 19, 1980 | 4–7 | @ Minnesota North Stars (1979–80) | 40–20–13 |
| 74 | W | March 22, 1980 | 5–2 | @ Atlanta Flames (1979–80) | 41–20–13 |
| 75 | W | March 23, 1980 | 7–2 | Philadelphia Flyers (1979–80) | 42–20–13 |
| 76 | W | March 27, 1980 | 7–1 | St. Louis Blues (1979–80) | 43–20–13 |
| 77 | W | March 30, 1980 | 3–1 | Winnipeg Jets (1979–80) | 44–20–13 |

April

| Game | Result | Date | Score | Opponent | Record |
|---|---|---|---|---|---|
| 78 | W | April 2, 1980 | 5–2 | @ Toronto Maple Leafs (1979–80) | 45–20–13 |
| 79 | L | April 5, 1980 | 1–6 | @ Montreal Canadiens (1979–80) | 45–21–13 |
| 80 | W | April 6, 1980 | 4–2 | Minnesota North Stars (1979–80) | 46–21–13 |

Legend: Win (2 points) Loss (0 points) Tie (1 point)

=== Playoffs ===
- Lost quarter-finals (4–1) to New York Islanders
- Won Preliminary round (3–2) over Pittsburgh Penguins

== Player statistics ==
=== Regular season ===
Scoring

| Player | Pos | GP | G | A | Pts | PIM | +/- | PPG | SHG | GWG |
|---|---|---|---|---|---|---|---|---|---|---|
| Rick Middleton | RW | 80 | 40 | 52 | 92 | 24 | 31 | 9 | 0 | 4 |
| Peter McNab | C | 74 | 40 | 38 | 78 | 10 | 24 | 11 | 0 | 9 |
| Jean Ratelle | C | 67 | 28 | 45 | 73 | 8 | 11 | 14 | 0 | 1 |
| Raymond Bourque | D | 80 | 17 | 48 | 65 | 73 | 52 | 3 | 2 | 1 |
| Terry O'Reilly | RW | 71 | 19 | 42 | 61 | 265 | 17 | 3 | 0 | 5 |
| Dick Redmond | D | 76 | 14 | 33 | 47 | 39 | 37 | 6 | 0 | 5 |
| Bob Miller | C | 80 | 16 | 25 | 41 | 53 | 9 | 0 | 1 | 2 |
| Stan Jonathan | LW | 79 | 21 | 19 | 40 | 208 | 20 | 0 | 0 | 3 |
| Al Secord | LW | 77 | 23 | 16 | 39 | 170 | 20 | 1 | 0 | 2 |
| Dwight Foster | RW | 57 | 10 | 28 | 38 | 42 | 23 | 1 | 1 | 2 |
| Bobby Lalonde | C | 71 | 10 | 25 | 35 | 28 | 14 | 1 | 2 | 0 |
| Wayne Cashman | LW | 44 | 11 | 21 | 32 | 19 | -3 | 3 | 1 | 2 |
| Craig MacTavish | C | 46 | 11 | 17 | 28 | 8 | 16 | 0 | 0 | 2 |
| Rick Smith | D | 78 | 8 | 18 | 26 | 62 | 22 | 0 | 0 | 2 |
| Mike Milbury | D | 72 | 10 | 13 | 23 | 59 | 7 | 1 | 0 | 0 |
| Brad Park | D | 32 | 5 | 16 | 21 | 27 | 11 | 2 | 0 | 2 |
| John Wensink | LW | 69 | 9 | 11 | 20 | 110 | 7 | 0 | 0 | 2 |
| Brad McCrimmon | D | 72 | 5 | 11 | 16 | 94 | -3 | 1 | 0 | 1 |
| Don Marcotte | LW | 32 | 4 | 11 | 15 | 0 | 4 | 0 | 1 | 1 |
| Bobby Schmautz | RW | 20 | 8 | 6 | 14 | 8 | -1 | 4 | 0 | 0 |
| Gary Doak | D | 52 | 0 | 5 | 5 | 45 | 14 | 0 | 0 | 0 |
| Tom Songin | RW | 17 | 1 | 3 | 4 | 16 | 0 | 0 | 0 | 0 |
| Gilles Gilbert | G | 33 | 0 | 1 | 1 | 10 | 0 | 0 | 0 | 0 |
| Marco Baron | G | 1 | 0 | 0 | 0 | 0 | 0 | 0 | 0 | 0 |
| Yves Belanger | G | 8 | 0 | 0 | 0 | 0 | 0 | 0 | 0 | 0 |
| Gerry Cheevers | G | 42 | 0 | 0 | 0 | 62 | 0 | 0 | 0 | 0 |
| Doug Morrison | RW | 1 | 0 | 0 | 0 | 0 | 0 | 0 | 0 | 0 |
| Dennis O'Brien | D | 3 | 0 | 0 | 0 | 2 | -4 | 0 | 0 | 0 |
| Jim Stewart | G | 1 | 0 | 0 | 0 | 0 | 0 | 0 | 0 | 0 |

Goaltending

| Player | MIN | GP | W | L | T | GA | GAA | SO |
|---|---|---|---|---|---|---|---|---|
| Gerry Cheevers | 2479 | 42 | 24 | 11 | 7 | 116 | 2.81 | 4 |
| Gilles Gilbert | 1933 | 33 | 20 | 9 | 3 | 88 | 2.73 | 1 |
| Yves Belanger | 328 | 8 | 2 | 0 | 3 | 19 | 3.48 | 0 |
| Marco Baron | 40 | 1 | 0 | 0 | 0 | 2 | 3.00 | 0 |
| Jim Stewart | 20 | 1 | 0 | 1 | 0 | 5 | 15.00 | 0 |
| Team: | 4800 | 80 | 46 | 21 | 13 | 230 | 2.87 | 5 |

=== Playoffs ===
Scoring

| Player | Pos | GP | G | A | Pts | PIM | PPG | SHG | GWG |
|---|---|---|---|---|---|---|---|---|---|
| Peter McNab | C | 10 | 8 | 6 | 14 | 2 | 3 | 0 | 1 |
| Raymond Bourque | D | 10 | 2 | 9 | 11 | 27 | 0 | 0 | 0 |
| Terry O'Reilly | RW | 10 | 3 | 6 | 9 | 69 | 2 | 0 | 1 |
| Brad Park | D | 10 | 3 | 6 | 9 | 4 | 0 | 0 | 0 |
| Dwight Foster | RW | 9 | 3 | 5 | 8 | 2 | 0 | 1 | 1 |
| Rick Middleton | RW | 10 | 4 | 2 | 6 | 5 | 0 | 0 | 0 |
| Wayne Cashman | LW | 10 | 3 | 3 | 6 | 32 | 1 | 0 | 0 |
| Bob Miller | C | 10 | 3 | 2 | 5 | 4 | 0 | 1 | 0 |
| Craig MacTavish | C | 10 | 2 | 3 | 5 | 7 | 0 | 0 | 0 |
| Don Marcotte | LW | 10 | 2 | 3 | 5 | 4 | 0 | 0 | 1 |
| Dick Redmond | D | 10 | 0 | 3 | 3 | 9 | 0 | 0 | 0 |
| Al Secord | LW | 10 | 0 | 3 | 3 | 65 | 0 | 0 | 0 |
| Brad McCrimmon | D | 10 | 1 | 1 | 2 | 28 | 0 | 0 | 0 |
| Rick Smith | D | 6 | 1 | 1 | 2 | 2 | 0 | 0 | 0 |
| Mike Milbury | D | 10 | 0 | 2 | 2 | 50 | 0 | 0 | 0 |
| Bobby Lalonde | C | 4 | 0 | 1 | 1 | 2 | 0 | 0 | 0 |
| Gerry Cheevers | G | 10 | 0 | 0 | 0 | 0 | 0 | 0 | 0 |
| Gary Doak | D | 4 | 0 | 0 | 0 | 0 | 0 | 0 | 0 |
| Stan Jonathan | LW | 9 | 0 | 0 | 0 | 29 | 0 | 0 | 0 |
| Jean Ratelle | C | 3 | 0 | 0 | 0 | 0 | 0 | 0 | 0 |
| John Wensink | LW | 4 | 0 | 0 | 0 | 5 | 0 | 0 | 0 |

Goaltending

| Player | MIN | GP | W | L | GA | GAA | SO |
|---|---|---|---|---|---|---|---|
| Gerry Cheevers | 619 | 10 | 4 | 6 | 32 | 3.10 | 0 |
| Team: | 619 | 10 | 4 | 6 | 32 | 3.10 | 0 |

Note:

Pos = Position;GP = Games played; G = Goals; A = Assists; Pts = Points; PIM = Penalty minutes; +/- = Plus/minus; PPG = Power-play goals; SHG = Short-handed goals; GWG = Game-winning goals
Pos = Position;GP = Games played; Min, TOI = Minutes played; W = Wins; L = Losses; T,T/OT = Ties; OTL = Overtime losses; GA = Goals-against; GAA = Goals-against average; SO = Shutouts; SA = Shots against; SV = Shots saved;SV% = Save percentage;

== Awards and records ==
- Ray Bourque, Calder Memorial Trophy Winner

== Draft picks ==
Boston's picks at the 1980 NHL entry draft were as follows:

| Round | # | Player | Position | Nationality | College/Junior/Club team (League) |
|---|---|---|---|---|---|
| 1 | 8 | Ray Bourque | Defense | Canada | Verdun Éperviers (QMJHL) |
| 1 | 15 | Brad McCrimmon | Defense | Canada | Brandon Wheat Kings (WHL) |
| 2 | 36 | Doug Morrison | Right wing | Canada | Lethbridge Broncos (WHL) |
| 3 | 57 | Keith Crowder | Right wing | Canada | Peterborough Petes (OMJHL) |
| 4 | 78 | Larry Melnyk | Defense | Canada | New Westminster Bruins (WHL) |
| 5 | 99 | Marco Baron | Goaltender | Canada | Montreal Juniors (QMJHL) |
| 6 | 120 | Mike Krushelnyski | Center | Canada | Montreal Juniors (QMJHL) |

== See also ==
- 1979–80 NHL season
