= Robert Markham (disambiguation) =

Robert Markham was a pseudonym for novelist Kingsley Amis.

Robert Markham may also refer to:

- Robert Markham, Mayor of Reading 1402 and 1407
- Robert Markham (MP) (1536–1606), MP for Grantham and Nottinghamshire
- Sir Robert Markham, 2nd Baronet (1644–1690), English politician
- Robert Markham (priest) (1768–1837), Archdeacon of York
- Robert Markham (game designer), American wargame designer
