= 1979–80 Buffalo Sabres season =

NHL hockey team season

1979–80 Buffalo Sabres
- Wales Conference champions
- Adams Division champions
- Division: 1st Adams
- Conference: 1st Wales
- 1979–80 record: 47–17–16
- Home record: 27–5–8
- Road record: 20–12–8
- Goals for: 318
- Goals against: 201

Team information
- General manager: John Anderson; Scotty Bowman
- Coach: Scotty Bowman
- Captain: Danny Gare
- Alternate captains: None
- Arena: Buffalo Memorial Auditorium
- Average attendance: 16,433

Team leaders
- Goals: Danny Gare (56)
- Assists: Gilbert Perreault (66)
- Points: Gilbert Perreault (106)
- Penalty minutes: Larry Playfair (145)
- Wins: Don Edwards (27)
- Goals against average: Bob Sauve (2.36)

The 1979–80 Buffalo Sabres season was the Sabres' tenth season of operation for the National Hockey League (NHL) franchise that was established on May 22, 1970. The team was awarded the Prince of Wales Trophy for finishing with the best regular season record in the Prince of Wales Conference. They lost in the third round of the playoffs to the New York Islanders.

== Offseason ==
=== NHL draft ===
Round	Pick	Player	Nationality	College/Junior/Club team
1	11	Mike Ramsey (D)	United States	University of Minnesota (WCHA)
2	32	Lindy Ruff (D)	Canada	Lethbridge Broncos (WHL)
3	53	Mark Robinson (D)	Canada	Victoria Cougars (WHL)
3	55	Jacques Cloutier (G)	Canada	Trois-Rivières Draveurs (QMJHL)
4	74	Gilles Hamel (LW)	Canada	Laval National (QMJHL)
5	95	Alan Haworth (C)	Canada	Sherbrooke Castors (QMJHL)
6	116	Rick Knickle (G)	Canada	Brandon Wheat Kings (WHL)

== Regular season ==
=== Season standings ===
Adams Division
	GP	W	L	T	GF	GA	Pts
**Buffalo Sabres**	80	47	17	16	318	201	110
**Boston Bruins**	80	46	21	13	310	234	105
**Minnesota North Stars**	80	36	28	16	311	253	88
**Toronto Maple Leafs**	80	35	40	5	304	327	75
Quebec Nordiques	80	25	44	11	248	313	61

Note: GP = Games played, W = Wins, L = Losses, T = Ties, Pts = Points, GF = Goals for, GA = Goals against
Note: Teams that qualified for the playoffs are highlighted in bold.

League standings
R		Div	GP	W	L	T	GF	GA	Pts
1	**p – Philadelphia Flyers**	PTK	80	48	12	20	327	254	116
2	**y – Buffalo Sabres**	ADM	80	47	17	16	318	201	110
3	**x – Montreal Canadiens**	NRS	80	47	20	13	328	240	107
4	**Boston Bruins**	ADM	80	46	21	13	310	234	105
5	**New York Islanders**	PTK	80	39	28	13	281	247	91
6	**Minnesota North Stars**	ADM	80	36	28	16	311	253	88
7	**x – Chicago Black Hawks**	SMY	80	34	27	19	241	250	87
8	**New York Rangers**	PTK	80	38	32	10	308	284	86
9	**Atlanta Flames**	PTK	80	35	32	13	282	269	83
10	**St. Louis Blues**	SMY	80	34	34	12	266	278	80
11	**Toronto Maple Leafs**	ADM	80	35	40	5	304	327	75
12	**Los Angeles Kings**	NRS	80	30	36	14	290	313	74
13	**Pittsburgh Penguins**	NRS	80	30	37	13	251	303	73
14	**Hartford Whalers**	NRS	80	27	34	19	303	312	73
15	**Vancouver Canucks**	SMY	80	27	37	16	256	281	70
16	**Edmonton Oilers**	SMY	80	28	39	13	301	322	69
17	Washington Capitals	PTK	80	27	40	13	261	293	67
18	Detroit Red Wings	NRS	80	26	43	11	268	306	63
19	Quebec Nordiques	ADM	80	25	44	11	248	313	61
20	Winnipeg Jets	SMY	80	20	49	11	214	314	51
21	Colorado Rockies	SMY	80	19	48	13	234	308	51

Divisions: ADM – Adams, NRS – Norris, PTK – Patrick, SMY – Smythe

bold – The top 16 teams in the league qualified for the playoffs, regardless of division or conference.
x – Won division; y – Won Conference (and division); p – Won Presidents' Trophy (and conference and division)

=== Record vs. opponents ===
Adams Division record vs. opponents

==== Vs. Wales Conference ====
**Vs. Adams Division**

1979–80 NHL records
Team	**BOS**	**BUF**	**MIN**	**QUE**	**TOR**	**Total**
Boston	—	2–1–1	2–2	4–0	4–0	**12–3–1**
Buffalo	1–2–1	—	2–1–1	3–1	4–0	**10–4–2**
Minnesota	2–2	1–2–1	—	2–1–1	2–2	**7–7–2**
Quebec	0–4	1–3	1–2–1	—	3–1	**5–10–1**
Toronto	0–4	0–4	2–2	1–3	—	**3–13–0**

**Vs. Norris Division**

1979–80 NHL records
Team	**DET**	**HFD**	**LAK**	**MTL**	**PIT**	**Total**
Boston	2–1–1	2–1–1	2–1–1	1–3	2–2	**9–8–3**
Buffalo	3–1	3–1	3–0–1	1–1–2	4–0	**14–3–3**
Minnesota	1–2–1	4–0	0–2–2	1–3	3–1	**9–8–3**
Quebec	1–2–1	1–1–2	1–3	1–2–1	2–2	**6–10–4**
Toronto	4–0	2–2	0–3–1	1–3	2–2	**9–10–1**

==== Vs. Campbell Conference ====
**Vs. Patrick Division**

1979–80 NHL records
Team	**ATL**	**NYI**	**NYR**	**PHI**	**WSH**	**Total**
Boston	4–0	3–1	2–2	1–1–2	2–1–1	**12–5–3**
Buffalo	3–0–1	2–1–1	2–1–1	0–3–1	4–0	**11–5–4**
Minnesota	1–1–2	2–0–2	2–1–1	1–3	3–0–1	**9–5–6**
Quebec	0–3–1	0–4	1–2–1	0–3–1	1–1–2	**2–13–5**
Toronto	3–1	1–3	2–2	1–1–2	3–1	**10–8–2**

**Vs. Smythe Division**

1979–80 NHL records
Team	**CHI**	**COL**	**EDM**	**STL**	**VAN**	**WIN**	**Total**
Boston	2−2	2−1−1	4−0	1−1−2	1−0−3	3−1	**13−5−6**
Buffalo	1−1−2	3−1	2−1−1	2−2	1−0−3	3−0−1	**12−5−7**
Minnesota	1−2−1	3−1	1−1−2	3−1	1−2−1	2−1−1	**11−8−5**
Quebec	1−2−1	3−1	2−2	2−2	2−2	2−2	**12−11−1**
Toronto	0−4	3−0−1	1−2−1	2−2	3−1	4−0	**13−9−2**

== Schedule and results ==
1979–80 regular season
October

Game	Result	Date	Score	Opponent	Record
1	W	October 11, 1979	6–3	Washington Capitals (1979–80)	1–0–0
2	W	October 13, 1979	5–2	@ New York Islanders (1979–80)	2–0–0
3	L	October 14, 1979	4–5	Minnesota North Stars (1979–80)	2–1–0
4	W	October 17, 1979	3–1	Hartford Whalers (1979–80)	3–1–0
5	L	October 20, 1979	2–3	@ St. Louis Blues (1979–80)	3–2–0
6	T	October 21, 1979	3–3	Vancouver Canucks (1979–80)	3–2–1
7	W	October 24, 1979	7–3	Pittsburgh Penguins (1979–80)	4–2–1
8	L	October 25, 1979	0–4	@ Detroit Red Wings (1979–80)	4–3–1
9	W	October 27, 1979	3–0	@ Quebec Nordiques (1979–80)	5–3–1
10	W	October 28, 1979	4–2	Colorado Rockies (1979–80)	6–3–1
11	T	October 31, 1979	0–0	@ Chicago Black Hawks (1979–80)	6–3–2

November

Game	Result	Date	Score	Opponent	Record
12	W	November 3, 1979	4–3	@ Toronto Maple Leafs (1979–80)	7–3–2
13	L	November 4, 1979	1–3	@ Philadelphia Flyers (1979–80)	7–4–2
14	T	November 8, 1979	3–3	Chicago Black Hawks (1979–80)	7–4–3
15	W	November 10, 1979	5–3	@ Washington Capitals (1979–80)	8–4–3
16	L	November 11, 1979	3–5	Colorado Rockies (1979–80)	8–5–3
17	W	November 15, 1979	5–1	Atlanta Flames (1979–80)	9–5–3
18	W	November 17, 1979	4–2	@ Minnesota North Stars (1979–80)	10–5–3
19	W	November 18, 1979	9–7	Edmonton Oilers (1979–80)	11–5–3
20	L	November 21, 1979	3–5	@ Hartford Whalers (1979–80)	11–6–3
21	W	November 24, 1979	6–1	@ Washington Capitals (1979–80)	12–6–3
22	W	November 25, 1979	6–2	Minnesota North Stars (1979–80)	13–6–3
23	W	November 27, 1979	5–2	@ Boston Bruins (1979–80)	14–6–3
24	W	November 29, 1979	2–1	New York Rangers (1979–80)	15–6–3

December

Game	Result	Date	Score	Opponent	Record
25	W	December 2, 1979	2–0	Washington Capitals (1979–80)	16–6–3
26	W	December 5, 1979	6–1	Atlanta Flames (1979–80)	17–6–3
27	W	December 7, 1979	5–3	@ Colorado Rockies (1979–80)	18–6–3
28	W	December 10, 1979	4–0	Detroit Red Wings (1979–80)	19–6–3
29	W	December 13, 1979	5–2	Chicago Black Hawks (1979–80)	20–6–3
30	L	December 15, 1979	2–3	@ Philadelphia Flyers (1979–80)	20–7–3
31	L	December 16, 1979	1–5	Boston Bruins (1979–80)	20–8–3
32	W	December 19, 1979	3–2	@ Winnipeg Jets (1979–80)	21–8–3
33	W	December 20, 1979	5–3	Los Angeles Kings (1979–80)	22–8–3
34	W	December 22, 1979	4–2	@ Hartford Whalers (1979–80)	23–8–3
35	L	December 23, 1979	1–3	Quebec Nordiques (1979–80)	23–9–3
36	W	December 27, 1979	5–3	Toronto Maple Leafs (1979–80)	24–9–3
37	L	December 29, 1979	3–6	@ Montreal Canadiens (1979–80)	24–10–3
38	W	December 31, 1979	6–2	Winnipeg Jets (1979–80)	25–10–3

January

Game	Result	Date	Score	Opponent	Record
39	W	January 5, 1980	5–4	@ Pittsburgh Penguins (1979–80)	26–10–3
40	L	January 6, 1980	2–4	Philadelphia Flyers (1979–80)	26–11–3
41	W	January 9, 1980	3–2	New York Islanders (1979–80)	27–11–3
42	W	January 11, 1980	4–3	@ Colorado Rockies (1979–80)	28–11–3
43	L	January 13, 1980	5–6	@ Edmonton Oilers (1979–80)	28–12–3
44	W	January 16, 1980	4–2	@ Los Angeles Kings (1979–80)	29–12–3
45	T	January 18, 1980	2–2	@ Vancouver Canucks (1979–80)	29–12–4
46	T	January 20, 1980	4–4	Edmonton Oilers (1979–80)	29–12–5
47	T	January 21, 1980	3–3	@ Atlanta Flames (1979–80)	29–12–6
48	L	January 24, 1980	3–4	@ Boston Bruins (1979–80)	29–13–6
49	W	January 26, 1980	7–2	@ Montreal Canadiens (1979–80)	30–13–6
50	W	January 27, 1980	9–1	Los Angeles Kings (1979–80)	31–13–6
51	W	January 31, 1980	6–2	New York Rangers (1979–80)	32–13–6

February

Game	Result	Date	Score	Opponent	Record
52	L	February 2, 1980	2–3	@ New York Islanders (1979–80)	32–14–6
53	W	February 3, 1980	3–0	Vancouver Canucks (1979–80)	33–14–6
54	W	February 7, 1980	9–0	Pittsburgh Penguins (1979–80)	34–14–6
55	L	February 9, 1980	2–3	@ St. Louis Blues (1979–80)	34–15–6
56	W	February 11, 1980	4–2	St. Louis Blues (1979–80)	35–15–6
57	T	February 14, 1980	3–3	Boston Bruins (1979–80)	35–15–7
58	W	February 16, 1980	4–3	@ Detroit Red Wings (1979–80)	36–15–7
59	T	February 17, 1980	2–2	Montreal Canadiens (1979–80)	36–15–8
60	W	February 19, 1980	3–1	@ Quebec Nordiques (1979–80)	37–15–8
61	W	February 20, 1980	4–3	Winnipeg Jets (1979–80)	38–15–8
62	L	February 24, 1980	1–3	@ Chicago Black Hawks (1979–80)	38–16–8
63	T	February 27, 1980	1–1	Philadelphia Flyers (1979–80)	38–16–9
64	W	February 29, 1980	4–2	@ Edmonton Oilers (1979–80)	39–16–9

March

Game	Result	Date	Score	Opponent	Record
65	T	March 2, 1980	2–2	@ Minnesota North Stars (1979–80)	39–16–10
66	L	March 5, 1980	2–4	@ New York Rangers (1979–80)	39–17–10
67	W	March 6, 1980	4–3	Hartford Whalers (1979–80)	40–17–10
68	W	March 9, 1980	9–4	St. Louis Blues (1979–80)	41–17–10
69	T	March 12, 1980	3–3	@ Winnipeg Jets (1979–80)	41–17–11
70	T	March 15, 1980	2–2	@ Los Angeles Kings (1979–80)	41–17–12
71	T	March 19, 1980	3–3	@ Vancouver Canucks (1979–80)	41–17–13
72	W	March 22, 1980	5–1	@ Toronto Maple Leafs (1979–80)	42–17–13
73	T	March 23, 1980	1–1	New York Islanders (1979–80)	42–17–14
74	T	March 25, 1980	3–3	@ New York Rangers (1979–80)	42–17–15
75	W	March 27, 1980	10–1	Detroit Red Wings (1979–80)	43–17–15
76	T	March 30, 1980	1–1	Montreal Canadiens (1979–80)	43–17–16

April

Game	Result	Date	Score	Opponent	Record
77	W	April 1, 1980	5–2	@ Atlanta Flames (1979–80)	44–17–16
78	W	April 3, 1980	8–3	Quebec Nordiques (1979–80)	45–17–16
79	W	April 5, 1980	9–1	@ Pittsburgh Penguins (1979–80)	46–17–16
80	W	April 6, 1980	7–3	Toronto Maple Leafs (1979–80)	47–17–16

Legend: Win (2 points) Loss (0 points) Tie (1 point)

== Playoffs ==
- First round
  - No. 2 seed Buffalo over No. 15 seed Vancouver (3 games to 1)
- Second round
  - No. 2 seed Buffalo over No. 7 seed Chicago (4 games to 0)
- Third round
  - No. 5 seed New York Islanders over No. 2 seed Buffalo (4 games to 2)

== Awards and records ==
- Prince of Wales Trophy
- NHL Plus/Minus Award Jim Schoenfeld
- Bob Sauve and Don Edwards, Vezina Trophy
- Danny Gare, NHL Goals Leader
- Don Edwards, Goaltender, NHL Second Team All-Star
- Danny Gare, Right Wing, NHL Second Team All-Star
- Jim Schoenfeld, Defenceman, NHL Second Team All-Star
- Bob Sauve, posted league's lowest goals against average.
