= 1979–80 Detroit Red Wings season =

National Hockey League team season

1979–80 Detroit Red Wings
- Division: 5th Norris
- Conference: 9th Wales
- 1979–80 record: 26–43–11
- Home record: 14–21–5
- Road record: 12–22–6
- Goals for: 268
- Goals against: 306

Team information
- General manager: Ted Lindsay
- Coach: Bobby Kromm, Ted Lindsay
- Captain: Dale McCourt
- Alternate captains: None
- Arena: Detroit Olympia (Oct-Dec); Joe Louis Arena (Dec-Apr)

Team leaders
- Goals: Mike Foligno (36)
- Assists: Dale McCourt (51)
- Points: Dale McCourt (81)
- Penalty minutes: Willie Huber (164)
- Wins: Rogie Vachon (20)
- Goals against average: Rogie Vachon (3.62)

The 1979–80 season was the first season that the Red Wings played at their at the time newly built arena, the Joe Louis Arena. The Red Wings failed to qualify for the playoffs for the second year in a row for the first time since the 1975–76 season and the 1976–77 season.

== Regular season ==
=== Final standings ===
Norris Division
	GP	W	L	T	GF	GA	Pts
**Montreal Canadiens**	80	47	20	13	328	240	107
**Los Angeles Kings**	80	30	36	14	290	313	74
**Pittsburgh Penguins**	80	30	37	13	251	303	73
**Hartford Whalers**	80	27	34	19	303	312	73
Detroit Red Wings	80	26	43	11	268	306	63

Note: GP = Games played, W = Wins, L = Losses, T = Ties, Pts = Points, GF = Goals for, GA = Goals against
Note: Teams that qualified for the playoffs are highlighted in bold.

League standings
R		Div	GP	W	L	T	GF	GA	Pts
1	**p – Philadelphia Flyers**	PTK	80	48	12	20	327	254	116
2	**y – Buffalo Sabres**	ADM	80	47	17	16	318	201	110
3	**x – Montreal Canadiens**	NRS	80	47	20	13	328	240	107
4	**Boston Bruins**	ADM	80	46	21	13	310	234	105
5	**New York Islanders**	PTK	80	39	28	13	281	247	91
6	**Minnesota North Stars**	ADM	80	36	28	16	311	253	88
7	**x – Chicago Black Hawks**	SMY	80	34	27	19	241	250	87
8	**New York Rangers**	PTK	80	38	32	10	308	284	86
9	**Atlanta Flames**	PTK	80	35	32	13	282	269	83
10	**St. Louis Blues**	SMY	80	34	34	12	266	278	80
11	**Toronto Maple Leafs**	ADM	80	35	40	5	304	327	75
12	**Los Angeles Kings**	NRS	80	30	36	14	290	313	74
13	**Pittsburgh Penguins**	NRS	80	30	37	13	251	303	73
14	**Hartford Whalers**	NRS	80	27	34	19	303	312	73
15	**Vancouver Canucks**	SMY	80	27	37	16	256	281	70
16	**Edmonton Oilers**	SMY	80	28	39	13	301	322	69
17	Washington Capitals	PTK	80	27	40	13	261	293	67
18	Detroit Red Wings	NRS	80	26	43	11	268	306	63
19	Quebec Nordiques	ADM	80	25	44	11	248	313	61
20	Winnipeg Jets	SMY	80	20	49	11	214	314	51
21	Colorado Rockies	SMY	80	19	48	13	234	308	51

Divisions: ADM – Adams, NRS – Norris, PTK – Patrick, SMY – Smythe

bold – The top 16 teams in the league qualified for the playoffs, regardless of division or conference.
x – Won division; y – Won Conference (and division); p – Won Presidents' Trophy (and conference and division)

=== Record vs. opponents ===
Norris Division record vs. opponents

==== Vs. Wales Conference ====
**Vs. Norris Division**

1979–80 NHL records
Team	**DET**	**HFD**	**LAK**	**MTL**	**PIT**	**Total**
Detroit	—	1–2–1	0–3–1	0–3–1	2–2	**3–10–3**
Hartford	2–1–1	—	2–1–1	0–1–3	2–1–1	**6–4–6**
Los Angeles	3–0–1	1–2–1	—	0–4	1–1–2	**5–7–4**
Montreal	3–0–1	1–0–3	4–0	—	2–1–1	**10–1–5**
Pittsburgh	2–2	1–2–1	1–1–2	1–2–1	—	**5–7–4**

**Vs. Adams Division**

1979–80 NHL records
Team	**BOS**	**BUF**	**MIN**	**QUE**	**TOR**	**Total**
Detroit	1–2–1	1–3	2–1–1	2–1–1	0–4	**6–11–3**
Hartford	1–2–1	1–3	0–4	1–1–2	2–2	**5–12–3**
Los Angeles	1–2–1	0–3–1	2–0–2	3–1	3–0–1	**9–6–5**
Montreal	3–1	1–1–2	3–1	2–1–1	3–1	**12–5–3**
Pittsburgh	2–2	0–4	1–3	2–2	2–2	**7–13–0**

==== Vs. Campbell Conference ====
**Vs. Patrick Division**

1979–80 NHL records
Team	**ATL**	**NYI**	**NYR**	**PHI**	**WSH**	**Total**
Detroit	1–2–1	3–1	1–3	0–3–1	2–1–1	**7–10–3**
Hartford	3–1	1–3	1–2–1	0–2–2	1–2–1	**6–10–4**
Los Angeles	1–2–1	1–2–1	1–3	0–4	1–3	**4–14–2**
Montreal	3–0–1	0–3–1	3–0–1	2–1–1	2–1–1	**10–5–5**
Pittsburgh	2–1–1	1–0–3	2–2	0–3–1	3–1	**8–7–5**

**Vs. Smythe Division**

1979–80 NHL records
Team	**CHI**	**COL**	**EDM**	**STL**	**VAN**	**WIN**	**Total**
Detroit	1−3	1−3	2−1–1	1−2−1	2−2	3−1	**10−12−2**
Hartford	1–1–2	2−1−1	2–1–1	2–2	1−1−2	2−2	**10−8−6**
Los Angeles	3−0−1	4−0	1−2−1	1−3	2−2	1−2−1	**12−9−3**
Montreal	2−2	3−1	3−1	2−2	2−2	3−1	**15−9−0**
Pittsburgh	0−2–2	2−2	1−3	1−2–1	2−1–1	4−0	**10−10−4**

== Schedule and results ==
1979–80 regular season
October

Game	Result	Date	Score	Opponent	Record
1	T	October 10, 1979	4–4	@ Los Angeles Kings (1979–80)	0–0–1
2	L	October 12, 1979	1–3	@ Vancouver Canucks (1979–80)	0–1–1
3	T	October 13, 1979	3–3	@ Edmonton Oilers (1979–80)	0–1–2
4	W	October 17, 1979	5–1	@ Winnipeg Jets (1979–80)	1–1–2
5	L	October 20, 1979	3–7	Philadelphia Flyers (1979–80)	1–2–2
6	W	October 25, 1979	4–0	Buffalo Sabres (1979–80)	2–2–2
7	L	October 27, 1979	2–3	@ Montreal Canadiens (1979–80)	2–3–2
8	L	October 28, 1979	4–5	@ Philadelphia Flyers (1979–80)	2–4–2
9	L	October 31, 1979	3–5	Minnesota North Stars (1979–80)	2–5–2

November

Game	Result	Date	Score	Opponent	Record
10	W	November 3, 1979	2–0	Chicago Black Hawks (1979–80)	3–5–2
11	L	November 4, 1979	1–5	@ Quebec Nordiques (1979–80)	3–6–2
12	W	November 7, 1979	5–3	Edmonton Oilers (1979–80)	4–6–2
13	L	November 10, 1979	1–2	Vancouver Canucks (1979–80)	4–7–2
14	L	November 14, 1979	2–3	@ New York Rangers (1979–80)	4–8–2
15	W	November 16, 1979	4–2	@ Washington Capitals (1979–80)	5–8–2
16	W	November 17, 1979	5–4	@ New York Islanders (1979–80)	6–8–2
17	L	November 21, 1979	1–4	@ Atlanta Flames (1979–80)	6–9–2
18	L	November 23, 1979	2–5	@ Colorado Rockies (1979–80)	6–10–2
19	T	November 24, 1979	3–3	@ Minnesota North Stars (1979–80)	6–10–3
20	T	November 27, 1979	5–5	Montreal Canadiens (1979–80)	6–10–4

December

Game	Result	Date	Score	Opponent	Record
21	W	December 1, 1979	6–3	Boston Bruins (1979–80)	7–10–4
22	T	December 2, 1979	4–4	@ Philadelphia Flyers (1979–80)	7–10–5
23	W	December 5, 1979	6–4	Winnipeg Jets (1979–80)	8–10–5
24	W	December 8, 1979	5–1	Vancouver Canucks (1979–80)	9–10–5
25	L	December 10, 1979	0–4	@ Buffalo Sabres (1979–80)	9–11–5
26	L	December 11, 1979	1–2	New York Rangers (1979–80)	9–12–5
27	T	December 13, 1979	6–6	@ Boston Bruins (1979–80)	9–12–6
28	T	December 15, 1979	4–4	Quebec Nordiques (1979–80)	9–12–7
29	L	December 16, 1979	3–7	@ Chicago Black Hawks (1979–80)	9–13–7
30	W	December 19, 1979	6–4	@ Edmonton Oilers (1979–80)	10–13–7
31	L	December 22, 1979	1–2	@ Toronto Maple Leafs (1979–80)	10–14–7
32	L	December 26, 1979	4–6	@ Pittsburgh Penguins (1979–80)	10–15–7
33	L	December 27, 1979	2–3	St. Louis Blues (1979–80)	10–16–7
34	W	December 30, 1979	4–2	New York Islanders (1979–80)	11–16–7
35	L	December 31, 1979	3–5	Colorado Rockies (1979–80)	11–17–7

January

Game	Result	Date	Score	Opponent	Record
36	L	January 2, 1980	2–4	Los Angeles Kings (1979–80)	11–18–7
37	W	January 4, 1980	6–3	@ Atlanta Flames (1979–80)	12–18–7
38	W	January 6, 1980	2–1	@ Hartford Whalers (1979–80)	13–18–7
39	W	January 9, 1980	4–0	New York Rangers (1979–80)	14–18–7
40	L	January 12, 1980	4–6	Hartford Whalers (1979–80)	14–19–7
41	L	January 13, 1980	2–3	@ Chicago Black Hawks (1979–80)	14–20–7
42	W	January 16, 1980	5–1	Colorado Rockies (1979–80)	15–20–7
43	W	January 18, 1980	5–0	@ Winnipeg Jets (1979–80)	16–20–7
44	W	January 19, 1980	5–4	@ Minnesota North Stars (1979–80)	17–20–7
45	L	January 23, 1980	3–5	New York Islanders (1979–80)	17–21–7
46	L	January 26, 1980	3–4	Atlanta Flames (1979–80)	17–22–7
47	W	January 27, 1980	7–6	@ Quebec Nordiques (1979–80)	18–22–7
48	L	January 30, 1980	4–6	@ Toronto Maple Leafs (1979–80)	18–23–7
49	W	January 31, 1980	4–3	Pittsburgh Penguins (1979–80)	19–23–7

February

Game	Result	Date	Score	Opponent	Record
50	W	February 2, 1980	3–0	@ St. Louis Blues (1979–80)	20–23–7
51	L	February 3, 1980	2–4	St. Louis Blues (1979–80)	20–24–7
52	T	February 6, 1980	2–2	Washington Capitals (1979–80)	20–24–8
53	L	February 9, 1980	5–6	Philadelphia Flyers (1979–80)	20–25–8
54	L	February 10, 1980	1–4	Toronto Maple Leafs (1979–80)	20–26–8
55	T	February 13, 1980	2–2	Atlanta Flames (1979–80)	20–26–9
56	L	February 16, 1980	3–4	Buffalo Sabres (1979–80)	20–27–9
57	L	February 18, 1980	2–4	Los Angeles Kings (1979–80)	20–28–9
58	L	February 20, 1980	5–7	@ Pittsburgh Penguins (1979–80)	20–29–9
59	L	February 23, 1980	1–5	@ Montreal Canadiens (1979–80)	20–30–9
60	W	February 24, 1980	7–5	Minnesota North Stars (1979–80)	21–30–9
61	W	February 28, 1980	4–1	Washington Capitals (1979–80)	22–30–9

March

Game	Result	Date	Score	Opponent	Record
62	W	March 1, 1980	4–3	@ New York Islanders (1979–80)	23–30–9
63	L	March 2, 1980	3–6	Toronto Maple Leafs (1979–80)	23–31–9
64	L	March 5, 1980	3–5	Boston Bruins (1979–80)	23–32–9
65	T	March 8, 1980	2–2	@ St. Louis Blues (1979–80)	23–32–10
66	W	March 9, 1980	6–2	Pittsburgh Penguins (1979–80)	24–32–10
67	T	March 12, 1980	4–4	Hartford Whalers (1979–80)	24–32–11
68	L	March 13, 1980	2–4	@ Boston Bruins (1979–80)	24–33–11
69	L	March 15, 1980	2–5	@ Washington Capitals (1979–80)	24–34–11
70	L	March 16, 1980	2–6	Winnipeg Jets (1979–80)	24–35–11
71	L	March 19, 1980	3–4	@ Los Angeles Kings (1979–80)	24–36–11
72	W	March 21, 1980	5–2	@ Vancouver Canucks (1979–80)	25–36–11
73	L	March 22, 1980	1–5	@ Colorado Rockies (1979–80)	25–37–11
74	L	March 26, 1980	2–5	Edmonton Oilers (1979–80)	25–38–11
75	L	March 27, 1980	1–10	@ Buffalo Sabres (1979–80)	25–39–11
76	W	March 29, 1980	9–7	Quebec Nordiques (1979–80)	26–39–11
77	L	March 31, 1980	5–7	@ New York Rangers (1979–80)	26–40–11

April

Game	Result	Date	Score	Opponent	Record
78	L	April 2, 1980	2–7	Montreal Canadiens (1979–80)	26–41–11
79	L	April 5, 1980	1–3	Chicago Black Hawks (1979–80)	26–42–11
80	L	April 6, 1980	3–5	@ Hartford Whalers (1979–80)	26–43–11

Legend: Win (2 points) Loss (0 points) Tie (1 point)

- Game 28 would be the last game ever played in the Detroit Olympia.
- Game 33 would be the first ice hockey game ever played in the Joe Louis Arena.

As a result, the Red Wings were forced on a four-game road trip from December 16 to 26.

== Player statistics ==
=== Regular season ===
Scoring

Player	Pos	GP	G	A	Pts	PIM	+/-	PPG	SHG	GWG
Dale McCourt	C	80	30	51	81	12	1	7	2	3
Vaclav Nedomansky	RW	79	35	39	74	13	-5	11	0	5
Mike Foligno	RW	80	36	35	71	109	-2	9	0	0
Reed Larson	D	80	22	44	66	101	-7	7	0	2
Pete Mahovlich	C	80	16	50	66	69	3	3	0	1
Dan Labraaten	LW	76	30	27	57	8	5	6	0	5
Errol Thompson	LW	77	34	14	48	22	-10	8	2	3
Willie Huber	D	76	17	23	40	164	-26	4	2	2
John Ogrodnick	LW	41	8	24	32	8	-4	3	0	1
Paul Woods	LW	79	6	20	26	24	-19	0	0	0
Jim Korn	D/LW	63	5	13	18	108	-4	1	0	1
Barry Long	D	80	0	17	17	38	-28	0	0	0
Bill Hogaboam	C	42	3	12	15	10	-8	0	0	1
Greg Joly	D	59	3	10	13	45	-2	0	0	0
George Lyle	LW	27	7	4	11	2	-2	0	0	2
Dan Bolduc	LW	44	6	5	11	19	-14	2	0	0
Dennis Sobchuk	C	33	4	6	10	0	-11	0	0	0
Dennis Polonich	C/RW	66	2	8	10	127	-15	0	0	0
Thommie Bergman	D	28	1	5	6	45	4	0	0	0
Jean Hamel	D	49	1	4	5	43	-2	0	0	0
Glenn Hicks	LW	50	1	2	3	43	-21	0	0	0
Brent Peterson	C	18	1	2	3	2	-1	0	0	0
Perry Miller	D	16	0	3	3	41	-4	0	0	0
Rogie Vachon	G	59	0	3	3	2	0	0	0	0
Alex Pirus	RW	4	0	2	2	0	0	0	0	0
Rejean Cloutier	D	3	0	1	1	0	2	0	0	0
John Hilworth	D	15	0	0	0	11	-2	0	0	0
Jim Rutherford	G	23	0	0	0	24	0	0	0	0
Kevin Schamehorn	RW	2	0	0	0	4	-2	0	0	0
Rick Vasko	D	8	0	0	0	2	-11	0	0	0
Tom Webster	RW	1	0	0	0	0	0	0	0	0

Goaltending

Player	MIN	GP	W	L	T	GA	GAA	SO
Rogie Vachon	3474	59	20	30	8	209	3.61	4
Jim Rutherford	1326	23	6	13	3	92	4.16	1
Team:	4800	80	26	43	11	301	3.76	5

Note: GP = Games played; G = Goals; A = Assists; Pts = Points; +/- = Plus-minus PIM = Penalty minutes; PPG = Power-play goals; SHG = Short-handed goals; GWG = Game-winning goals;
MIN = Minutes played; W = Wins; L = Losses; T = Ties; GA = Goals against; GAA = Goals-against average; SO = Shutouts;

== Draft picks ==
Detroit's draft picks at the 1979 NHL entry draft held at the Queen Elizabeth Hotel in Montreal.

Round	#	Player	Nationality	College/Junior/Club team (League)
1	3	Mike Foligno	Canada	Sudbury Wolves (OHL)
3	45	Jody Gage	Canada	Kitchener Rangers (OMJHL)
3	46	Boris Fistric	Canada	New Westminster Bruins (WHL)
4	66	John Ogrodnick	Canada	New Westminster Bruins (WHL)
5	87	Joe Paterson	Canada	London Knights (OMJHL)
6	108	Carmine Cirella	Canada	Peterborough Petes (OMJHL)

== See also ==
- 1979–80 NHL season
- 1980 in Michigan
