= 1979–80 St. Louis Blues season =

National Hockey League team season

1979–80 St. Louis Blues
- Division: 2nd Smythe
- Conference: 6th Campbell
- 1979–80 record: 34–34–12
- Home record: 20–13–7
- Road record: 14–21–5
- Goals for: 266
- Goals against: 278

Team information
- General manager: Emile Francis
- Coach: Barclay Plager
- Captain: Brian Sutter
- Alternate captains: None
- Arena: Checkerdome
- Average attendance: 12,258 (69.5%)

Team leaders
- Goals: Bernie Federko (38)
- Assists: Bernie Federko (56)
- Points: Bernie Federko (94)
- Penalty minutes: Brian Sutter (156)
- Wins: Mike Liut (32)
- Goals against average: Mike Liut (3.18)

The 1979–80 St. Louis Blues season was the 13th in franchise history. It involved the team returning to the NHL playoffs for the first time in three seasons, following the team's 34-34-12 record during the regular-season, good for 80 points. The season started the team's run of 25 consecutive seasons of playoff appearances, a record for any non-Original Six NHL franchise.

== Regular season ==
=== Final standings ===
Smythe Division
	GP	W	L	T	GF	GA	Pts
**Chicago Black Hawks**	80	34	27	19	241	250	87
**St. Louis Blues**	80	34	34	12	266	278	80
**Vancouver Canucks**	80	27	37	16	256	281	70
**Edmonton Oilers**	80	28	39	13	301	322	69
Winnipeg Jets	80	20	49	11	214	314	51
Colorado Rockies	80	19	48	13	234	308	51

Note: GP = Games played, W = Wins, L = Losses, T = Ties, Pts = Points, GF = Goals for, GA = Goals against
Note: Teams that qualified for the playoffs are highlighted in bold.

League standings
R		Div	GP	W	L	T	GF	GA	Pts
1	**p – Philadelphia Flyers**	PTK	80	48	12	20	327	254	116
2	**y – Buffalo Sabres**	ADM	80	47	17	16	318	201	110
3	**x – Montreal Canadiens**	NRS	80	47	20	13	328	240	107
4	**Boston Bruins**	ADM	80	46	21	13	310	234	105
5	**New York Islanders**	PTK	80	39	28	13	281	247	91
6	**Minnesota North Stars**	ADM	80	36	28	16	311	253	88
7	**x – Chicago Black Hawks**	SMY	80	34	27	19	241	250	87
8	**New York Rangers**	PTK	80	38	32	10	308	284	86
9	**Atlanta Flames**	PTK	80	35	32	13	282	269	83
10	**St. Louis Blues**	SMY	80	34	34	12	266	278	80
11	**Toronto Maple Leafs**	ADM	80	35	40	5	304	327	75
12	**Los Angeles Kings**	NRS	80	30	36	14	290	313	74
13	**Pittsburgh Penguins**	NRS	80	30	37	13	251	303	73
14	**Hartford Whalers**	NRS	80	27	34	19	303	312	73
15	**Vancouver Canucks**	SMY	80	27	37	16	256	281	70
16	**Edmonton Oilers**	SMY	80	28	39	13	301	322	69
17	Washington Capitals	PTK	80	27	40	13	261	293	67
18	Detroit Red Wings	NRS	80	26	43	11	268	306	63
19	Quebec Nordiques	ADM	80	25	44	11	248	313	61
20	Winnipeg Jets	SMY	80	20	49	11	214	314	51
21	Colorado Rockies	SMY	80	19	48	13	234	308	51

Divisions: ADM – Adams, NRS – Norris, PTK – Patrick, SMY – Smythe

bold – The top 16 teams in the league qualified for the playoffs, regardless of division or conference.
x – Won division; y – Won Conference (and division); p – Won Presidents' Trophy (and conference and division)

=== Record vs. opponents ===
Smythe Division record vs. opponents

==== Vs. Campbell Conference ====
**Vs. Smythe Division**

1979–80 NHL records
Team	**CHI**	**COL**	**EDM**	**STL**	**VAN**	**WIN**	**Total**
Chicago	—	3−0−1	1−3	1−2−1	1−1−2	2−2	8−8−4
Colorado	0−3−1	—	2−2	0−2−2	1−2−1	1−2−1	4−11−5
Edmonton	3−1	2−2	—	0−3−1	1−2−1	1−2−1	7−10−3
St. Louis	2−1−1	2−0−2	3−0−1	—	3−1	1−1−2	11−3−6
Vancouver	1−1−2	2−1−1	2−1−1	1−3	—	2−1−1	8−7−5
Winnipeg	2−2	2−1−1	1−2−1	2−2	1−2−1	—	8−9−3

**Vs. Patrick Division**

1979–80 NHL records
Team	**ATL**	**NYI**	**NYR**	**PHI**	**WSH**	**Total**
Chicago	2−0−2	1−2−1	2−1−1	0−2−2	2−2	7−7−6
Colorado	0−4	1−3	1−1−2	1−2−1	1−1−2	4−11−5
Edmonton	1−2−1	2−1−1	1−3	0−3−1	3−1	7−10−3
St. Louis	1−3	1−3	0−4	0−2−2	2−2	4−14−2
Vancouver	2−2	2−1−1	0−4	1−3	1−3	6−13−1
Winnipeg	0−4	0−2−2	2−2	0−4	0−3−1	2−15−3

**Vs. Wales Conference**

**Vs. Adams Division**

1979–80 NHL records
Team	**BOS**	**BUF**	**MIN**	**QUE**	**TOR**	**Total**
Chicago	2−2	1−1−2	2−1−1	2−1−1	4−0	11−5−4
Colorado	1−2−1	1−3	1−3	1−3	0−3−1	4−14−2
Edmonton	0−4	1−2−1	1−1−2	2−2	2−1−1	6−10−4
St. Louis	1−1−2	2−2	1−3	2−2	2−2	8−10−2
Vancouver	0−1−3	0−1−3	2−1−1	2−2	1−3	5−8−7
Winnipeg	1−3	0−3−1	1−2−1	2−2	0−4	4−14−2

**Vs. Norris Division**

1979–80 NHL records
Team	**DET**	**HFD**	**LAK**	**MTL**	**PIT**	**Total**
Chicago	3−1	1−1−2	0−3−1	2−2	2−0−2	8−7−5
Colorado	3−1	1−2−1	0−4	1−3	2−2	7−12−1
Edmonton	1−2−1	1−2−1	2−1−1	1−3	3−1	8−9−3
St. Louis	2−1−1	2−2	3−1	2−2	2−1−1	11−7−2
Vancouver	2−2	1−1−2	2−2	2−2	1−2−1	8−9−3
Winnipeg	1−3	2−2	2−1−1	1−3	0−4	6−13−1

== Schedule and results ==
1979–80 regular season
October

Game	Result	Date	Score	Opponent	Record
1	W	October 9, 1979	5–2	@ Vancouver Canucks (1979–80)	1–0–0
2	T	October 11, 1979	3–3	@ Colorado Rockies (1979–80)	1–0–1
3	L	October 13, 1979	3–5	@ Los Angeles Kings (1979–80)	1–1–1
4	L	October 17, 1979	1–5	Vancouver Canucks (1979–80)	1–2–1
5	W	October 20, 1979	3–2	Buffalo Sabres (1979–80)	2–2–1
6	T	October 23, 1979	5–5	Boston Bruins (1979–80)	2–2–2
7	L	October 24, 1979	2–5	@ Minnesota North Stars (1979–80)	2–3–2
8	L	October 27, 1979	0–3	Atlanta Flames (1979–80)	2–4–2
9	T	October 28, 1979	2–2	@ Winnipeg Jets (1979–80)	2–4–3
10	W	October 30, 1979	2–1	Edmonton Oilers (1979–80)	3–4–3

November

Game	Result	Date	Score	Opponent	Record
11	L	November 1, 1979	1–3	@ Philadelphia Flyers (1979–80)	3–5–3
12	W	November 3, 1979	4–1	Los Angeles Kings (1979–80)	4–5–3
13	L	November 7, 1979	4–7	Toronto Maple Leafs (1979–80)	4–6–3
14	W	November 10, 1979	5–3	@ Montreal Canadiens (1979–80)	5–6–3
15	L	November 11, 1979	1–4	@ Quebec Nordiques (1979–80)	5–7–3
16	L	November 13, 1979	2–5	Montreal Canadiens (1979–80)	5–8–3
17	L	November 14, 1979	2–7	@ Toronto Maple Leafs (1979–80)	5–9–3
18	T	November 17, 1979	3–3	Philadelphia Flyers (1979–80)	5–9–4
19	L	November 18, 1979	3–5	@ New York Rangers (1979–80)	5–10–4
20	W	November 20, 1979	6–3	New York Islanders (1979–80)	6–10–4
21	L	November 21, 1979	2–5	@ Pittsburgh Penguins (1979–80)	6–11–4
22	W	November 24, 1979	4–3	Colorado Rockies (1979–80)	7–11–4
23	L	November 25, 1979	3–6	@ Chicago Black Hawks (1979–80)	7–12–4
24	W	November 27, 1979	4–2	Quebec Nordiques (1979–80)	8–12–4
25	L	November 29, 1979	2–3	@ Montreal Canadiens (1979–80)	8–13–4

December

Game	Result	Date	Score	Opponent	Record
26	L	December 1, 1979	0–2	New York Rangers (1979–80)	8–14–4
27	L	December 4, 1979	2–4	Winnipeg Jets (1979–80)	8–15–4
28	L	December 6, 1979	2–5	@ Quebec Nordiques (1979–80)	8–16–4
29	W	December 8, 1979	5–1	Washington Capitals (1979–80)	9–16–4
30	T	December 11, 1979	3–3	Pittsburgh Penguins (1979–80)	9–16–5
31	L	December 15, 1979	1–3	Minnesota North Stars (1979–80)	9–17–5
32	W	December 18, 1979	5–3	Montreal Canadiens (1979–80)	10–17–5
33	W	December 21, 1979	5–1	@ Atlanta Flames (1979–80)	11–17–5
34	L	December 22, 1979	3–7	Atlanta Flames (1979–80)	11–18–5
35	T	December 26, 1979	3–3	Chicago Black Hawks (1979–80)	11–18–6
36	W	December 27, 1979	3–2	@ Detroit Red Wings (1979–80)	12–18–6
37	W	December 29, 1979	3–0	Hartford Whalers (1979–80)	13–18–6

January

Game	Result	Date	Score	Opponent	Record
38	W	January 3, 1980	6–2	Vancouver Canucks (1979–80)	14–18–6
39	L	January 5, 1980	1–3	@ New York Islanders (1979–80)	14–19–6
40	W	January 8, 1980	6–3	Los Angeles Kings (1979–80)	15–19–6
41	W	January 10, 1980	7–4	@ Boston Bruins (1979–80)	16–19–6
42	W	January 12, 1980	8–2	Quebec Nordiques (1979–80)	17–19–6
43	T	January 13, 1980	1–1	@ Philadelphia Flyers (1979–80)	17–19–7
44	W	January 15, 1980	2–1	Minnesota North Stars (1979–80)	18–19–7
45	L	January 16, 1980	3–7	@ Minnesota North Stars (1979–80)	18–20–7
46	W	January 19, 1980	3–1	@ Colorado Rockies (1979–80)	19–20–7
47	L	January 22, 1980	1–3	Philadelphia Flyers (1979–80)	19–21–7
48	T	January 26, 1980	4–4	Colorado Rockies (1979–80)	19–21–8
49	T	January 27, 1980	6–6	@ Winnipeg Jets (1979–80)	19–21–9
50	W	January 29, 1980	3–2	Edmonton Oilers (1979–80)	20–21–9
51	W	January 30, 1980	4–3	@ Pittsburgh Penguins (1979–80)	21–21–9

February

Game	Result	Date	Score	Opponent	Record
52	L	February 2, 1980	0–3	Detroit Red Wings (1979–80)	21–22–9
53	W	February 3, 1980	4–2	@ Detroit Red Wings (1979–80)	22–22–9
54	W	February 6, 1980	6–3	@ Edmonton Oilers (1979–80)	23–22–9
55	W	February 9, 1980	3–2	Buffalo Sabres (1979–80)	24–22–9
56	L	February 11, 1980	2–4	@ Buffalo Sabres (1979–80)	24–23–9
57	W	February 14, 1980	6–4	@ Los Angeles Kings (1979–80)	25–23–9
58	T	February 17, 1980	5–5	@ Edmonton Oilers (1979–80)	25–23–10
59	W	February 19, 1980	3–1	@ Vancouver Canucks (1979–80)	26–23–10
60	L	February 23, 1980	2–3	New York Islanders (1979–80)	26–24–10
61	W	February 26, 1980	5–2	Toronto Maple Leafs (1979–80)	27–24–10
62	L	February 29, 1980	0–3	@ Hartford Whalers (1979–80)	27–25–10

March

Game	Result	Date	Score	Opponent	Record
63	L	March 1, 1980	3–6	Hartford Whalers (1979–80)	27–26–10
64	W	March 3, 1980	5–1	Pittsburgh Penguins (1979–80)	28–26–10
65	L	March 5, 1980	5–7	@ Washington Capitals (1979–80)	28–27–10
66	T	March 8, 1980	2–2	Detroit Red Wings (1979–80)	28–27–11
67	L	March 9, 1980	4–9	@ Buffalo Sabres (1979–80)	28–28–11
68	W	March 12, 1980	3–2	@ Toronto Maple Leafs (1979–80)	29–28–11
69	L	March 15, 1980	2–6	@ New York Islanders (1979–80)	29–29–11
70	L	March 16, 1980	2–5	@ New York Rangers (1979–80)	29–30–11
71	T	March 18, 1980	3–3	Boston Bruins (1979–80)	29–30–12
72	L	March 20, 1980	4–8	@ Atlanta Flames (1979–80)	29–31–12
73	W	March 22, 1980	6–2	Washington Capitals (1979–80)	30–31–12
74	W	March 24, 1980	7–5	@ Hartford Whalers (1979–80)	31–31–12
75	L	March 26, 1980	2–4	@ Washington Capitals (1979–80)	31–32–12
76	L	March 27, 1980	1–7	@ Boston Bruins (1979–80)	31–33–12
77	L	March 29, 1980	3–4	New York Rangers (1979–80)	31–34–12

April

Game	Result	Date	Score	Opponent	Record
78	W	April 1, 1980	5–2	Chicago Black Hawks (1979–80)	32–34–12
79	W	April 5, 1980	6–0	Winnipeg Jets (1979–80)	33–34–12
80	W	April 6, 1980	5–4	@ Chicago Black Hawks (1979–80)	34–34–12

Legend: Win (2 points) Loss (0 points) Tie (1 point)

== Playoffs ==
1980 Stanley Cup playoffs
Preliminary round vs. (7) Chicago Black Hawks – Black Hawks win 3–0

Game	Date	Visitor	Score	Home	OT	Series
1	April 8	St. Louis	2 – 3	Chicago	OT	0 – 1
2	April 9	St. Louis	1 – 5	Chicago		0 – 2
3	April 11	Chicago	4 – 1	St. Louis		0 – 3

Legend: Win Loss

== Player statistics ==
=== Regular season ===
Scoring

Player	Pos	GP	G	A	Pts	PIM	+/-	PPG	SHG	GWG
Bernie Federko	C	79	38	56	94	24	3	7	0	4
Mike Zuke	C	69	22	42	64	30	-2	6	1	1
Wayne Babych	RW	59	26	35	61	49	11	7	0	3
Brian Sutter	LW	71	23	35	58	156	3	6	0	1
Blair Chapman	RW	63	25	26	51	28	-5	7	0	6
Blake Dunlop	C	72	18	27	45	28	-6	8	0	2
Jack Brownschidle	D	77	12	32	44	8	16	3	0	2
Perry Turnbull	C	80	16	19	35	124	-11	3	0	1
Larry Patey	C	78	17	17	34	76	-18	0	3	3
Tony Currie	RW	40	19	14	33	4	9	2	0	3
Ralph Klassen	C	80	9	16	25	10	-19	0	0	3
Rick Lapointe	D	80	6	19	25	87	-24	0	0	1
Mike Crombeen	RW	71	10	12	22	20	-14	1	0	2
Ed Kea	D	69	3	16	19	79	9	0	0	1
Joe Micheletti	D	54	2	16	18	29	-5	2	0	0
Hartland Monahan	RW	72	5	12	17	36	-22	1	1	0
Chuck Lefley	LW	28	6	6	12	0	5	0	0	0
Bryan Maxwell	D	57	1	11	12	112	-13	0	0	0
Neil Komadoski	D	49	0	12	12	52	-22	0	0	0
Terry Harper	D	11	1	5	6	6	5	0	0	0
Floyd Thomson	LW	11	2	3	5	18	-1	0	0	0
Bobby Simpson	LW	18	2	2	4	0	-2	0	0	0
Rick Bowness	RW	10	1	2	3	11	-2	0	0	0
Don Laurence	C	20	1	2	3	8	-7	0	0	1
Len Frig	D	7	0	2	2	4	-5	0	0	0
Bob Crawford	RW	8	1	0	1	2	-6	0	0	0
Dick Lamby	D	12	0	1	1	10	-7	0	0	0
Bob Stewart	D	10	0	1	1	4	-1	0	0	0
Larry Giroux	D	3	0	0	0	4	-3	0	0	0
Doug Grant	G	1	0	0	0	0	0	0	0	0
Mike Liut	G	64	0	0	0	2	0	0	0	0
Ed Staniowski	G	22	0	0	0	2	0	0	0	0

Goaltending

Player	MIN	GP	W	L	T	GA	GAA	SO
Mike Liut	3661	64	32	23	9	194	3.18	2
Ed Staniowski	1108	22	2	11	3	80	4.33	0
Doug Grant	31	1	0	0	0	1	1.94	0
Team:	4800	80	34	34	12	275	3.44	2

=== Playoffs ===
Scoring

Player	Pos	GP	G	A	Pts	PIM	PPG	SHG	GWG
Wayne Babych	RW	3	1	2	3	2	0	0	0
Perry Turnbull	C	3	1	1	2	2	1	0	0
Blake Dunlop	C	3	0	2	2	2	0	0	0
Bernie Federko	C	3	1	0	1	2	0	0	0
Larry Patey	C	3	1	0	1	2	0	0	0
Rick Lapointe	D	3	0	1	1	6	0	0	0
Jack Brownschidle	D	3	0	0	0	0	0	0	0
Blair Chapman	RW	3	0	0	0	0	0	0	0
Mike Crombeen	RW	2	0	0	0	0	0	0	0
Tony Currie	RW	2	0	0	0	0	0	0	0
Len Frig	D	3	0	0	0	0	0	0	0
Terry Harper	D	3	0	0	0	2	0	0	0
Ed Kea	D	3	0	0	0	2	0	0	0
Ralph Klassen	C	3	0	0	0	0	0	0	0
Mike Liut	G	3	0	0	0	0	0	0	0
Bryan Maxwell	D	1	0	0	0	9	0	0	0
Hartland Monahan	RW	3	0	0	0	0	0	0	0
Joe Mullen	RW	1	0	0	0	0	0	0	0
Brian Sutter	LW	3	0	0	0	4	0	0	0
Mike Zuke	C	3	0	0	0	2	0	0	0

Goaltending

Player	MIN	GP	W	L	GA	GAA	SO
Mike Liut	193	3	0	3	12	3.73	0
Team:	193	3	0	3	12	3.73	0

Note:

Pos = Position;GP = Games played; G = Goals; A = Assists; Pts = Points; PIM = Penalty minutes; +/- = Plus/minus; PPG = Power-play goals; SHG = Short-handed goals; GWG = Game-winning goals
Pos = Position;GP = Games played; Min, TOI = Minutes played; W = Wins; L = Losses; T,T/OT = Ties; OTL = Overtime losses; GA = Goals-against; GAA = Goals-against average; SO = Shutouts; SA = Shots against; SV = Shots saved;SV% = Save percentage;

== Draft picks ==
St. Louis's draft picks at the 1979 NHL entry draft held at the Queen Elizabeth Hotel in Montreal.

Round	#	Player	Nationality	College/Junior/Club team (League)
1	2	Perry Turnbull	Canada	Portland Winter Hawks (WHL)
4	65	Bob Crawford	Canada	Cornwall Royals (QMJHL)
5	86	Mark Reeds	Canada	Peterborough Petes (OMJHL)
6	107	Gilles Leduc	Canada	Verdun Eperviers (QMJHL)

== See also ==
- 1979–80 NHL season
