= 1979–80 Minnesota North Stars season =

National Hockey League team season

1979–80 Minnesota North Stars
- Division: 3rd Adams
- Conference: 4th Wales
- 1979–80 record: 36–28–16
- Home record: 25–8–7
- Road record: 11–20–9
- Goals for: 311
- Goals against: 253

Team information
- General manager: Lou Nanne
- Coach: Glen Sonmor
- Captain: Paul Shmyr
- Alternate captains: None
- Arena: Met Center
- Average attendance: 13,076 (83.3%)

Team leaders
- Goals: Al MacAdam (42); Steve Payne (42)
- Assists: Bobby Smith (56)
- Points: Al MacAdam (93)
- Penalty minutes: Brad Maxwell (126)
- Plus/minus: Steve Payne (+37)
- Wins: Gilles Meloche (27)
- Goals against average: Gilles Meloche (3.06)

The 1979–80 Minnesota North Stars season was the 13th season in North Stars history. The previous year's merger with the Cleveland Barons began to pay off as the North Stars finished with a winning record for the first time in seven years, and finished in third place in the Adams Division with 88 points. Former Baron Al MacAdam led the team in scoring with 93 points and captured the Bill Masterton Trophy. In the playoffs, the North Stars swept the Toronto Maple Leafs in three games in the preliminary round. In the quarterfinals, they shocked the hockey world by eliminating the 4-time Stanley Cup champion Montreal Canadiens in seven games. The upset earned the North Stars a trip to the semi-finals, where their cinderella run came to an end when they fell in five games to the Philadelphia Flyers.

== Offseason ==
=== NHL draft ===
| Round | Pick | Player | Nationality | College/Junior/Club team |
|---|---|---|---|---|
| 1 | 6 | Craig Hartsburg (D) | Canada | Birmingham Bulls (WHA) |
| 1 | 10 | Tom McCarthy (LW) | Canada | Oshawa Generals (OHL) |
| 2 | 42 | Neal Broten (C) | United States | University of Minnesota (WCHA) |
| 3 | 63 | Kevin Maxwell (C) | Canada | University of North Dakota (WCHA) |
| 5 | 90 | Jim Dobson (RW) | Canada | Portland Winter Hawks (WHL) |
| 6 | 111 | Brian Gualazzi (RW) | Canada | Sault Ste. Marie Greyhounds (OMJHL) |

== Regular season ==
=== Final standings ===
Adams Division
| | GP | W | L | T | GF | GA | Pts |
|---|---|---|---|---|---|---|---|
| **Buffalo Sabres** | 80 | 47 | 17 | 16 | 318 | 201 | 110 |
| **Boston Bruins** | 80 | 46 | 21 | 13 | 310 | 234 | 105 |
| **Minnesota North Stars** | 80 | 36 | 28 | 16 | 311 | 253 | 88 |
| **Toronto Maple Leafs** | 80 | 35 | 40 | 5 | 304 | 327 | 75 |
| Quebec Nordiques | 80 | 25 | 44 | 11 | 248 | 313 | 61 |

Note: GP = Games played, W = Wins, L = Losses, T = Ties, Pts = Points, GF = Goals for, GA = Goals against
Note: Teams that qualified for the playoffs are highlighted in bold.

League standings
| R | | Div | GP | W | L | T | GF | GA | Pts |
|---|---|---|---|---|---|---|---|---|---|
| 1 | **p – Philadelphia Flyers** | PTK | 80 | 48 | 12 | 20 | 327 | 254 | 116 |
| 2 | **y – Buffalo Sabres** | ADM | 80 | 47 | 17 | 16 | 318 | 201 | 110 |
| 3 | **x – Montreal Canadiens** | NRS | 80 | 47 | 20 | 13 | 328 | 240 | 107 |
| 4 | **Boston Bruins** | ADM | 80 | 46 | 21 | 13 | 310 | 234 | 105 |
| 5 | **New York Islanders** | PTK | 80 | 39 | 28 | 13 | 281 | 247 | 91 |
| 6 | **Minnesota North Stars** | ADM | 80 | 36 | 28 | 16 | 311 | 253 | 88 |
| 7 | **x – Chicago Black Hawks** | SMY | 80 | 34 | 27 | 19 | 241 | 250 | 87 |
| 8 | **New York Rangers** | PTK | 80 | 38 | 32 | 10 | 308 | 284 | 86 |
| 9 | **Atlanta Flames** | PTK | 80 | 35 | 32 | 13 | 282 | 269 | 83 |
| 10 | **St. Louis Blues** | SMY | 80 | 34 | 34 | 12 | 266 | 278 | 80 |
| 11 | **Toronto Maple Leafs** | ADM | 80 | 35 | 40 | 5 | 304 | 327 | 75 |
| 12 | **Los Angeles Kings** | NRS | 80 | 30 | 36 | 14 | 290 | 313 | 74 |
| 13 | **Pittsburgh Penguins** | NRS | 80 | 30 | 37 | 13 | 251 | 303 | 73 |
| 14 | **Hartford Whalers** | NRS | 80 | 27 | 34 | 19 | 303 | 312 | 73 |
| 15 | **Vancouver Canucks** | SMY | 80 | 27 | 37 | 16 | 256 | 281 | 70 |
| 16 | **Edmonton Oilers** | SMY | 80 | 28 | 39 | 13 | 301 | 322 | 69 |
| 17 | Washington Capitals | PTK | 80 | 27 | 40 | 13 | 261 | 293 | 67 |
| 18 | Detroit Red Wings | NRS | 80 | 26 | 43 | 11 | 268 | 306 | 63 |
| 19 | Quebec Nordiques | ADM | 80 | 25 | 44 | 11 | 248 | 313 | 61 |
| 20 | Winnipeg Jets | SMY | 80 | 20 | 49 | 11 | 214 | 314 | 51 |
| 21 | Colorado Rockies | SMY | 80 | 19 | 48 | 13 | 234 | 308 | 51 |

Divisions: ADM – Adams, NRS – Norris, PTK – Patrick, SMY – Smythe

bold – The top 16 teams in the league qualified for the playoffs, regardless of division or conference.
x – Won division; y – Won Conference (and division); p – Won Presidents' Trophy (and conference and division)

=== Record vs. opponents ===
Adams Division record vs. opponents

==== Vs. Wales Conference ====
**Vs. Adams Division**

1979–80 NHL records
| Team | **BOS** | **BUF** | **MIN** | **QUE** | **TOR** | **Total** |
|---|---|---|---|---|---|---|
| Boston | — | 2–1–1 | 2–2 | 4–0 | 4–0 | **12–3–1** |
| Buffalo | 1–2–1 | — | 2–1–1 | 3–1 | 4–0 | **10–4–2** |
| Minnesota | 2–2 | 1–2–1 | — | 2–1–1 | 2–2 | **7–7–2** |
| Quebec | 0–4 | 1–3 | 1–2–1 | — | 3–1 | **5–10–1** |
| Toronto | 0–4 | 0–4 | 2–2 | 1–3 | — | **3–13–0** |

**Vs. Norris Division**

1979–80 NHL records
| Team | **DET** | **HFD** | **LAK** | **MTL** | **PIT** | **Total** |
|---|---|---|---|---|---|---|
| Boston | 2–1–1 | 2–1–1 | 2–1–1 | 1–3 | 2–2 | **9–8–3** |
| Buffalo | 3–1 | 3–1 | 3–0–1 | 1–1–2 | 4–0 | **14–3–3** |
| Minnesota | 1–2–1 | 4–0 | 0–2–2 | 1–3 | 3–1 | **9–8–3** |
| Quebec | 1–2–1 | 1–1–2 | 1–3 | 1–2–1 | 2–2 | **6–10–4** |
| Toronto | 4–0 | 2–2 | 0–3–1 | 1–3 | 2–2 | **9–10–1** |

==== Vs. Campbell Conference ====
**Vs. Patrick Division**

1979–80 NHL records
| Team | **ATL** | **NYI** | **NYR** | **PHI** | **WSH** | **Total** |
|---|---|---|---|---|---|---|
| Boston | 4–0 | 3–1 | 2–2 | 1–1–2 | 2–1–1 | **12–5–3** |
| Buffalo | 3–0–1 | 2–1–1 | 2–1–1 | 0–3–1 | 4–0 | **11–5–4** |
| Minnesota | 1–1–2 | 2–0–2 | 2–1–1 | 1–3 | 3–0–1 | **9–5–6** |
| Quebec | 0–3–1 | 0–4 | 1–2–1 | 0–3–1 | 1–1–2 | **2–13–5** |
| Toronto | 3–1 | 1–3 | 2–2 | 1–1–2 | 3–1 | **10–8–2** |

**Vs. Smythe Division**

1979–80 NHL records
| Team | **CHI** | **COL** | **EDM** | **STL** | **VAN** | **WIN** | **Total** |
|---|---|---|---|---|---|---|---|
| Boston | 2−2 | 2−1−1 | 4−0 | 1−1−2 | 1−0−3 | 3−1 | **13−5−6** |
| Buffalo | 1−1−2 | 3−1 | 2−1−1 | 2−2 | 1−0−3 | 3−0−1 | **12−5−7** |
| Minnesota | 1−2−1 | 3−1 | 1−1−2 | 3−1 | 1−2−1 | 2−1−1 | **11−8−5** |
| Quebec | 1−2−1 | 3−1 | 2−2 | 2−2 | 2−2 | 2−2 | **12−11−1** |
| Toronto | 0−4 | 3−0−1 | 1−2−1 | 2−2 | 3−1 | 4−0 | **13−9−2** |

== Schedule and results ==
1979–80 regular season
October

| Game | Result | Date | Score | Opponent | Record |
|---|---|---|---|---|---|
| 1 | W | October 11, 1979 | 4–1 | Hartford Whalers (1979–80) | 1–0–0 |
| 2 | W | October 13, 1979 | 5–1 | Chicago Black Hawks (1979–80) | 2–0–0 |
| 3 | W | October 14, 1979 | 5–4 | @ Buffalo Sabres (1979–80) | 3–0–0 |
| 4 | L | October 17, 1979 | 2–6 | @ Toronto Maple Leafs (1979–80) | 3–1–0 |
| 5 | L | October 19, 1979 | 2–3 | @ Winnipeg Jets (1979–80) | 3–2–0 |
| 6 | T | October 21, 1979 | 5–5 | @ Edmonton Oilers (1979–80) | 3–2–1 |
| 7 | W | October 24, 1979 | 5–2 | St. Louis Blues (1979–80) | 4–2–1 |
| 8 | W | October 27, 1979 | 7–2 | New York Rangers (1979–80) | 5–2–1 |
| 9 | W | October 31, 1979 | 5–3 | @ Detroit Red Wings (1979–80) | 6–2–1 |

November

| Game | Result | Date | Score | Opponent | Record |
|---|---|---|---|---|---|
| 10 | L | November 1, 1979 | 1–5 | @ Montreal Canadiens (1979–80) | 6–3–1 |
| 11 | W | November 3, 1979 | 7–1 | Washington Capitals (1979–80) | 7–3–1 |
| 12 | T | November 6, 1979 | 7–7 | @ Vancouver Canucks (1979–80) | 7–3–2 |
| 13 | W | November 9, 1979 | 6–5 | @ Colorado Rockies (1979–80) | 8–3–2 |
| 14 | T | November 10, 1979 | 6–6 | @ Los Angeles Kings (1979–80) | 8–3–3 |
| 15 | W | November 14, 1979 | 7–2 | Quebec Nordiques (1979–80) | 9–3–3 |
| 16 | L | November 17, 1979 | 2–4 | Buffalo Sabres (1979–80) | 9–4–3 |
| 17 | T | November 18, 1979 | 3–3 | @ Chicago Black Hawks (1979–80) | 9–4–4 |
| 18 | W | November 21, 1979 | 3–1 | New York Islanders (1979–80) | 10–4–4 |
| 19 | T | November 24, 1979 | 3–3 | Detroit Red Wings (1979–80) | 10–4–5 |
| 20 | L | November 25, 1979 | 2–6 | @ Buffalo Sabres (1979–80) | 10–5–5 |
| 21 | T | November 28, 1979 | 4–4 | @ New York Rangers (1979–80) | 10–5–6 |
| 22 | L | November 29, 1979 | 4–6 | @ Philadelphia Flyers (1979–80) | 10–6–6 |

December

| Game | Result | Date | Score | Opponent | Record |
|---|---|---|---|---|---|
| 23 | T | December 1, 1979 | 4–4 | Winnipeg Jets (1979–80) | 10–6–7 |
| 24 | W | December 5, 1979 | 6–1 | Edmonton Oilers (1979–80) | 11–6–7 |
| 25 | W | December 7, 1979 | 4–1 | Atlanta Flames (1979–80) | 12–6–7 |
| 26 | W | December 12, 1979 | 5–4 | @ Washington Capitals (1979–80) | 13–6–7 |
| 27 | L | December 14, 1979 | 2–3 | @ Atlanta Flames (1979–80) | 13–7–7 |
| 28 | W | December 15, 1979 | 3–1 | @ St. Louis Blues (1979–80) | 14–7–7 |
| 29 | W | December 17, 1979 | 5–1 | Toronto Maple Leafs (1979–80) | 15–7–7 |
| 30 | W | December 19, 1979 | 5–2 | Montreal Canadiens (1979–80) | 16–7–7 |
| 31 | W | December 26, 1979 | 6–0 | Winnipeg Jets (1979–80) | 17–7–7 |
| 32 | L | December 27, 1979 | 3–4 | @ Colorado Rockies (1979–80) | 17–8–7 |
| 33 | L | December 29, 1979 | 3–4 | @ Los Angeles Kings (1979–80) | 17–9–7 |
| 34 | W | December 31, 1979 | 4–2 | Pittsburgh Penguins (1979–80) | 18–9–7 |

January

| Game | Result | Date | Score | Opponent | Record |
|---|---|---|---|---|---|
| 35 | W | January 2, 1980 | 2–1 | Boston Bruins (1979–80) | 19–9–7 |
| 36 | T | January 5, 1980 | 2–2 | Washington Capitals (1979–80) | 19–9–8 |
| 37 | W | January 7, 1980 | 7–1 | Philadelphia Flyers (1979–80) | 20–9–8 |
| 38 | W | January 9, 1980 | 6–2 | Hartford Whalers (1979–80) | 21–9–8 |
| 39 | L | January 12, 1980 | 5–6 | Los Angeles Kings (1979–80) | 21–10–8 |
| 40 | L | January 15, 1980 | 1–2 | @ St. Louis Blues (1979–80) | 21–11–8 |
| 41 | W | January 16, 1980 | 7–3 | St. Louis Blues (1979–80) | 22–11–8 |
| 42 | L | January 19, 1980 | 4–5 | Detroit Red Wings (1979–80) | 22–12–8 |
| 43 | L | January 21, 1980 | 0–3 | @ Boston Bruins (1979–80) | 22–13–8 |
| 44 | L | January 23, 1980 | 4–6 | @ Quebec Nordiques (1979–80) | 22–14–8 |
| 45 | T | January 26, 1980 | 4–4 | Los Angeles Kings (1979–80) | 22–14–9 |
| 46 | L | January 27, 1980 | 0–3 | @ Chicago Black Hawks (1979–80) | 22–15–9 |
| 47 | T | January 29, 1980 | 2–2 | @ New York Islanders (1979–80) | 22–15–10 |
| 48 | L | January 31, 1980 | 2–4 | @ Philadelphia Flyers (1979–80) | 22–16–10 |

February

| Game | Result | Date | Score | Opponent | Record |
|---|---|---|---|---|---|
| 49 | L | February 2, 1980 | 4–5 | Vancouver Canucks (1979–80) | 22–17–10 |
| 50 | W | February 3, 1980 | 6–2 | Colorado Rockies (1979–80) | 23–17–10 |
| 51 | W | February 9, 1980 | 5–2 | @ Pittsburgh Penguins (1979–80) | 24–17–10 |
| 52 | W | February 10, 1980 | 6–2 | @ Hartford Whalers (1979–80) | 25–17–10 |
| 53 | L | February 13, 1980 | 3–5 | Edmonton Oilers (1979–80) | 25–18–10 |
| 54 | T | February 16, 1980 | 2–2 | Atlanta Flames (1979–80) | 25–18–11 |
| 55 | W | February 18, 1980 | 6–2 | Quebec Nordiques (1979–80) | 26–18–11 |
| 56 | T | February 19, 1980 | 4–4 | @ Atlanta Flames (1979–80) | 26–18–12 |
| 57 | W | February 21, 1980 | 5–2 | @ New York Islanders (1979–80) | 27–18–12 |
| 58 | W | February 23, 1980 | 6–3 | New York Rangers (1979–80) | 28–18–12 |
| 59 | L | February 24, 1980 | 5–7 | @ Detroit Red Wings (1979–80) | 28–19–12 |
| 60 | W | February 26, 1980 | 5–4 | Vancouver Canucks (1979–80) | 29–19–12 |
| 61 | L | February 28, 1980 | 3–6 | @ Montreal Canadiens (1979–80) | 29–20–12 |

March

| Game | Result | Date | Score | Opponent | Record |
|---|---|---|---|---|---|
| 62 | L | March 1, 1980 | 1–4 | Chicago Black Hawks (1979–80) | 29–21–12 |
| 63 | T | March 2, 1980 | 2–2 | Buffalo Sabres (1979–80) | 29–21–13 |
| 64 | T | March 5, 1980 | 3–3 | @ Quebec Nordiques (1979–80) | 29–21–14 |
| 65 | L | March 8, 1980 | 2–6 | Philadelphia Flyers (1979–80) | 29–22–14 |
| 66 | L | March 9, 1980 | 2–4 | @ New York Rangers (1979–80) | 29–23–14 |
| 67 | L | March 12, 1980 | 3–4 | Montreal Canadiens (1979–80) | 29–24–14 |
| 68 | L | March 15, 1980 | 2–5 | @ Pittsburgh Penguins (1979–80) | 29–25–14 |
| 69 | W | March 16, 1980 | 6–1 | @ Hartford Whalers (1979–80) | 30–25–14 |
| 70 | W | March 18, 1980 | 4–3 | Pittsburgh Penguins (1979–80) | 31–25–14 |
| 71 | W | March 19, 1980 | 7–4 | Boston Bruins (1979–80) | 32–25–14 |
| 72 | W | March 21, 1980 | 4–3 | @ Washington Capitals (1979–80) | 33–25–14 |
| 73 | W | March 23, 1980 | 7–1 | Colorado Rockies (1979–80) | 34–25–14 |
| 74 | W | March 25, 1980 | 7–2 | Toronto Maple Leafs (1979–80) | 35–25–14 |
| 75 | W | March 28, 1980 | 2–1 | @ Winnipeg Jets (1979–80) | 36–25–14 |
| 76 | L | March 30, 1980 | 3–5 | @ Vancouver Canucks (1979–80) | 36–26–14 |

April

| Game | Result | Date | Score | Opponent | Record |
|---|---|---|---|---|---|
| 77 | T | April 1, 1980 | 1–1 | New York Islanders (1979–80) | 36–26–15 |
| 78 | T | April 2, 1980 | 1–1 | @ Edmonton Oilers (1979–80) | 36–26–16 |
| 79 | L | April 5, 1980 | 1–2 | @ Toronto Maple Leafs (1979–80) | 36–27–16 |
| 80 | L | April 6, 1980 | 2–4 | @ Boston Bruins (1979–80) | 36–28–16 |

Legend: Win (2 points) Loss (0 points) Tie (1 point)

== Playoffs ==
- NHL 1st round
  - 4/8/1980 Toronto Maple Leafs 6 – 3 (Stars lead 1 – 0)
  - 4/9/1980 Toronto Maple Leafs 7 – 2 (Stars lead 2 – 0)
  - 4/11/1980 at Toronto Maple Leafs 4 – 3 (Stars win 3 – 0)
- NHL Quarter-finals
  - 4/16/1980 at Montreal Canadiens 3 – 0 (Stars lead 1 – 0)
  - 4/17/1980 at Montreal Canadiens 4 – 1 (Stars lead 2 – 0)
  - 4/19/1980 Montreal Canadiens 0 – 5 (Stars lead 2 – 1)
  - 4/20/1980 Montreal Canadiens 1 – 5 (Series tied 2 – 2)
  - 4/22/1980 at Montreal Canadiens 2 – 6 (Canadiens lead 3 – 2)
  - 4/24/1980 Montreal Canadiens 5 – 2 (Series tied 3 – 3)
  - 4/27/1980 at Montreal Canadiens 3 – 2 (Stars win 4 – 3)
  - Series winning goal scored by Al MacAdam.
- NHL Semi-finals
  - 4/29/1980 at Philadelphia Flyers 6 – 5 (Stars lead 1 – 0)
  - 5/1/1980 at Philadelphia Flyers 0 – 7 (Series tied 1 – 1)
  - 5/4/1980 Philadelphia Flyers 3 – 5 (Flyers lead 2 – 1)
  - 5/6/1980 Philadelphia Flyers 2 – 3 (Flyers lead 3 – 1)
  - 5/8/1980 at Philadelphia Flyers 3 – 7 (Flyers win 4 – 1)

== Player statistics ==
=== Skaters ===
Note: GP = Games played; G = Goals; A = Assists; Pts = Points; +/- = Plus/minus; PIM = Penalty minutes

| Player | GP | G | A | Pts | +/- | PIM |
|---|---|---|---|---|---|---|
| Al MacAdam | 80 | 42 | 51 | 93 | +36 | 24 |
| Steve Payne | 80 | 42 | 43 | 85 | +37 | 40 |

=== Goaltenders ===
Note: GP = Games played; TOI = Time on ice (minutes); W = Wins; L = Losses; OT = Overtime losses; GA = Goals against; SO = Shutouts; SV% = Save percentage; GAA = Goals against average

| Player | GP | TOI | W | L | OT | GA | SO | SV% | GAA |
|---|---|---|---|---|---|---|---|---|---|
| Gilles Meloche | 54 | 3141 | 27 | 20 | 5 | 160 | 1 | | 3.06 |

== Awards and records ==
- Bill Masterton Memorial Trophy: || Al MacAdam, Minnesota North Stars
