= William Markham =

William Markham may refer to:

- William Markham (bishop) (1710–1807), English scholar and religious figure
- William Markham (governor) (1635–1704), first acting governor of colonial Pennsylvania
- William Markham (mayor) (1811–1890), Atlanta businessman and mayor
- William Markham (MP) (by 1533–1571), MP for Nottingham (UK Parliament constituency)
- William H. Markham (1888–1958), Wisconsin politician
- William Orlando Markham (1818–1891), English physician and pioneer of cardiology
