= Robert Markham (game designer) =

Robert Markham is a prolific American wargame designer. His game Raid on St. Nazaire won the 1987 Charles S. Roberts awards for Best World War II Board Game and Best Wargame Graphics.

Markham is credited as the designer of at least 60 board games or game items. He has also run his own game publishing company with Markham Designs. His co-designer for a few of his early games was Mark Seaman, who was Markham's college roommate and the best man at his wedding.

Games that Robert Markham has designed or co-designed include the following:

- 1987 Raid on St. Nazaire with Mark Seaman, (1987 Charles S. Roberts Best World War II Board Game winner; 1987 Charles S. Roberts Best Wargame Graphics winner)
- 1988 Pegasus Bridge: The Beginning of D-Day – June 6, 1944 with Mark Seaman, (1988 Charles S. Roberts Best World War II Board Game nominee; 1988 Charles S. Roberts Best Wargaming Graphics nominee)
- 1988 Lee Invades the North with Mark Seaman, (1988 Charles S. Roberts Best Pre-World War II Board Game nominee)
- 1991 Royalists & Roundheads, four of the most important English Civil War battles
- 1993 The Campaigns of Frederick the Great, a 1-4 player game featuring the Seven Years' War
- 2002 Soldier Kings, a 2-8 player game featuring the Seven Years' War
- 2003 Napoleon at the Berezina, (2003 Charles S. Roberts Best Magazine-Published Board Game nominee)
- 2003 Granada: The Fall of Moslem Spain, a game featuring Ferdinand and Isabella against the Moors
- 2003 Soldier Emperor, a 2-7 player game featuring the Napoleonic Wars
- 2007 The Campaigns of King David, a 2-5 player game featuring the struggle for the Holy Land

Markham is now a retired history and English teacher who taught middle school and high school in Danbury, Connecticut, for 37 years. He served as associate editor of North & South magazine for seven years and was an editor of Volunteers magazine, another American Civil War magazine, for five years.
