= Ray Markham =

Canadian ice hockey player

- Born: January 23, 1958 (age 67); Windsor, Ontario, Canada
- Height: 6 ft 3 in (191 cm)
- Weight: 208 lb (94 kg; 14 st 12 lb)
- Position: Right wing
- Shot: Right
- Played for: New York Rangers
- NHL draft: 43rd overall, 1978; New York Rangers
- Playing career: 1978–1984

Raymond Joseph Markham (born January 23, 1958) is a Canadian former professional ice hockey player. He played 14 games in the National Hockey League with the New York Rangers during the 1979–80 season. The rest of his career, which lasted from 1978 to 1984, was spent in the minor leagues.

He currently is an assistant coach with the Orchard Lake St. Mary's high school hockey team in Michigan.

== Career statistics ==
=== Regular season and playoffs ===
| | | | Regular season | | | | | Playoffs |
| Season | Team | League | GP | G | A | Pts | PIM | GP | G | A | Pts | PIM |
|---|---|---|---|---|---|---|---|---|---|---|---|---|
| 1975–76 | Notre Dame Hounds | U18 AAA | 45 | 15 | 19 | 34 | 245 | — | — | — | — | — |
| 1976–77 | Flin Flon Bombers | WCHL | 68 | 33 | 41 | 74 | 318 | — | — | — | — | — |
| 1977–78 | Flin Flon Bombers | WCHL | 68 | 35 | 65 | 100 | 323 | 17 | 10 | 13 | 23 | 96 |
| 1978–79 | New Haven Nighthawks | AHL | 77 | 13 | 15 | 28 | 151 | 8 | 2 | 3 | 5 | 10 |
| 1979–80 | New York Rangers | NHL | 14 | 1 | 1 | 2 | 21 | 7 | 1 | 0 | 1 | 24 |
| 1979–80 | New Haven Nighthawks | AHL | 57 | 9 | 20 | 29 | 198 | — | — | — | — | — |
| 1980–81 | New Haven Nighthawks | AHL | 42 | 10 | 9 | 19 | 122 | — | — | — | — | — |
| 1980–81 | Wichita Wind | CHL | 7 | 1 | 1 | 2 | 18 | — | — | — | — | — |
| 1981–82 | Wichita Wind | CHL | 48 | 15 | 12 | 27 | 110 | — | — | — | — | — |
| 1982–83 | Flint Generals | IHL | 42 | 16 | 30 | 46 | 176 | 5 | 2 | 4 | 6 | 52 |
| 1983–84 | Flint Generals | IHL | 12 | 2 | 3 | 5 | 39 | — | — | — | — | — |
| 1983–84 | Kalamazoo Wings | IHL | 69 | 23 | 28 | 51 | 172 | 3 | 1 | 2 | 3 | 9 |
| AHL totals | | | 176 | 32 | 44 | 76 | 471 | 8 | 2 | 3 | 5 | 10 |
| NHL totals | | | 14 | 1 | 1 | 2 | 21 | 7 | 1 | 0 | 1 | 24 |
