= 1979–80 Edmonton Oilers season =

NHL team season (first year in NHL)

1979–80 Edmonton Oilers
- Division: 4th Smythe
- Conference: 8th Campbell
- 1979–80 record: 28–39–13
- Home record: 17–14–9
- Road record: 11–25–4
- Goals for: 301
- Goals against: 322

Team information
- General manager: Larry Gordon
- Coach: Glen Sather
- Captain: Ron Chipperfield (Oct-Mar); Blair MacDonald (Mar-Apr)
- Alternate captains: None
- Arena: Northlands Coliseum
- Average attendance: 15,431 (100.1%)
- Minor league affiliates: Houston Apollos (CHL); Dayton Gems (IHL)

Team leaders
- Goals: Wayne Gretzky (51)
- Assists: Wayne Gretzky (86)
- Points: Wayne Gretzky (137)
- Penalty minutes: Colin Campbell (196)
- Plus/minus: Doug Hicks (+18)
- Wins: Eddie Mio (9)
- Goals against average: Ron Low (3.42)

The 1979–80 Edmonton Oilers season was the Oilers' eighth season and their first season in the National Hockey League (NHL). The Oilers were one of four WHA organizations that were granted NHL expansion franchises under the terms of an expansion agreement that took effect on June 22, 1979.

The Oilers were led offensively by rookie superstar Wayne Gretzky, as he tied for the lead league in points at 137, however lost the Art Ross Trophy due to scoring 2 fewer goals than winner Marcel Dionne. Gretzky, however, won the Hart Memorial Trophy as MVP of the NHL but was declared ineligible for the Calder Memorial Trophy due to his playing days in the WHA.

Edmonton played six goaltenders during the season and was led by Eddie Mio's nine wins, while Ron Low, who came over in a trade with the Quebec Nordiques, would go 8–2–1 in 11 games with the Oilers.

They made the playoffs; however, they were quickly swept out by the powerful Philadelphia Flyers in 3 games. Despite this, Oilers fans were very excited about being part of the NHL, and of the future of the team.

== Regular season ==
=== Final standings ===
Smythe Division
	GP	W	L	T	GF	GA	Pts
**Chicago Black Hawks**	80	34	27	19	241	250	87
**St. Louis Blues**	80	34	34	12	266	278	80
**Vancouver Canucks**	80	27	37	16	256	281	70
**Edmonton Oilers**	80	28	39	13	301	322	69
Winnipeg Jets	80	20	49	11	214	314	51
Colorado Rockies	80	19	48	13	234	308	51

Note: GP = Games played, W = Wins, L = Losses, T = Ties, Pts = Points, GF = Goals for, GA = Goals against
Note: Teams that qualified for the playoffs are highlighted in bold.

League standings
R		Div	GP	W	L	T	GF	GA	Pts
1	**p – Philadelphia Flyers**	PTK	80	48	12	20	327	254	116
2	**y – Buffalo Sabres**	ADM	80	47	17	16	318	201	110
3	**x – Montreal Canadiens**	NRS	80	47	20	13	328	240	107
4	**Boston Bruins**	ADM	80	46	21	13	310	234	105
5	**New York Islanders**	PTK	80	39	28	13	281	247	91
6	**Minnesota North Stars**	ADM	80	36	28	16	311	253	88
7	**x – Chicago Black Hawks**	SMY	80	34	27	19	241	250	87
8	**New York Rangers**	PTK	80	38	32	10	308	284	86
9	**Atlanta Flames**	PTK	80	35	32	13	282	269	83
10	**St. Louis Blues**	SMY	80	34	34	12	266	278	80
11	**Toronto Maple Leafs**	ADM	80	35	40	5	304	327	75
12	**Los Angeles Kings**	NRS	80	30	36	14	290	313	74
13	**Pittsburgh Penguins**	NRS	80	30	37	13	251	303	73
14	**Hartford Whalers**	NRS	80	27	34	19	303	312	73
15	**Vancouver Canucks**	SMY	80	27	37	16	256	281	70
16	**Edmonton Oilers**	SMY	80	28	39	13	301	322	69
17	Washington Capitals	PTK	80	27	40	13	261	293	67
18	Detroit Red Wings	NRS	80	26	43	11	268	306	63
19	Quebec Nordiques	ADM	80	25	44	11	248	313	61
20	Winnipeg Jets	SMY	80	20	49	11	214	314	51
21	Colorado Rockies	SMY	80	19	48	13	234	308	51

Divisions: ADM – Adams, NRS – Norris, PTK – Patrick, SMY – Smythe

bold – The top 16 teams in the league qualified for the playoffs, regardless of division or conference.
x – Won division; y – Won Conference (and division); p – Won Presidents' Trophy (and conference and division)

=== Record vs. opponents ===
Smythe Division record vs. opponents

==== Vs. Campbell Conference ====
**Vs. Smythe Division**

1979–80 NHL records
Team	**CHI**	**COL**	**EDM**	**STL**	**VAN**	**WIN**	**Total**
Chicago	—	3−0−1	1−3	1−2−1	1−1−2	2−2	8−8−4
Colorado	0−3−1	—	2−2	0−2−2	1−2−1	1−2−1	4−11−5
Edmonton	3−1	2−2	—	0−3−1	1−2−1	1−2−1	7−10−3
St. Louis	2−1−1	2−0−2	3−0−1	—	3−1	1−1−2	11−3−6
Vancouver	1−1−2	2−1−1	2−1−1	1−3	—	2−1−1	8−7−5
Winnipeg	2−2	2−1−1	1−2−1	2−2	1−2−1	—	8−9−3

**Vs. Patrick Division**

1979–80 NHL records
Team	**ATL**	**NYI**	**NYR**	**PHI**	**WSH**	**Total**
Chicago	2−0−2	1−2−1	2−1−1	0−2−2	2−2	7−7−6
Colorado	0−4	1−3	1−1−2	1−2−1	1−1−2	4−11−5
Edmonton	1−2−1	2−1−1	1−3	0−3−1	3−1	7−10−3
St. Louis	1−3	1−3	0−4	0−2−2	2−2	4−14−2
Vancouver	2−2	2−1−1	0−4	1−3	1−3	6−13−1
Winnipeg	0−4	0−2−2	2−2	0−4	0−3−1	2−15−3

**Vs. Wales Conference**

**Vs. Adams Division**

1979–80 NHL records
Team	**BOS**	**BUF**	**MIN**	**QUE**	**TOR**	**Total**
Chicago	2−2	1−1−2	2−1−1	2−1−1	4−0	11−5−4
Colorado	1−2−1	1−3	1−3	1−3	0−3−1	4−14−2
Edmonton	0−4	1−2−1	1−1−2	2−2	2−1−1	6−10−4
St. Louis	1−1−2	2−2	1−3	2−2	2−2	8−10−2
Vancouver	0−1−3	0−1−3	2−1−1	2−2	1−3	5−8−7
Winnipeg	1−3	0−3−1	1−2−1	2−2	0−4	4−14−2

**Vs. Norris Division**

1979–80 NHL records
Team	**DET**	**HFD**	**LAK**	**MTL**	**PIT**	**Total**
Chicago	3−1	1−1−2	0−3−1	2−2	2−0−2	8−7−5
Colorado	3−1	1−2−1	0−4	1−3	2−2	7−12−1
Edmonton	1−2−1	1−2−1	2−1−1	1−3	3−1	8−9−3
St. Louis	2−1−1	2−2	3−1	2−2	2−1−1	11−7−2
Vancouver	2−2	1−1−2	2−2	2−2	1−2−1	8−9−3
Winnipeg	1−3	2−2	2−1−1	1−3	0−4	6−13−1

== Schedule and results ==
1979–80 regular season
October: 1–5–4 (home: 1–1–3; road: 0–4–1)

Game	Date	Visitor	Score	Home	OT	Decision	Attendance	Record	Pts	Recap
1	October 10	Edmonton Oilers	2 – 4	Chicago Black Hawks		Dryden	10,138	0–1–0	0	
2	October 13	Detroit Red Wings	3 – 3	Edmonton Oilers		Mio	15,248	0–1–1	1	
3	October 14	Vancouver Canucks	4 – 4	Edmonton Oilers		Dryden	15,300	0–1–2	2	
4	October 19	Quebec Nordiques	3 – 6	Edmonton Oilers		Mio	15,386	1–1–2	4	
5	October 21	Minnesota North Stars	5 – 5	Edmonton Oilers		Mio	15,423	1–1–3	5	
6	October 23	Edmonton Oilers	3 – 3	New York Islanders		Mio	13,751	1–1–4	6	
7	October 24	Edmonton Oilers	2 – 10	New York Rangers		Mio	17,407	1–2–4	6	
8	October 26	Edmonton Oilers	3 – 7	Atlanta Flames		Dryden	8,420	1–3–4	6	
9	October 28	Washington Capitals	6 – 4	Edmonton Oilers		Mio	15,393	1–4–4	6	
10	October 30	Edmonton Oilers	1 – 2	St. Louis Blues		Mio	8,262	1–5–4	6	

November: 4–7–2 (home: 3–2–1; road: 1–5–1)

Game	Date	Visitor	Score	Home	OT	Decision	Attendance	Record	Pts	Recap
11	November 2	New York Islanders	5 – 7	Edmonton Oilers		Mio	15,418	2–5–4	8	
12	November 4	Boston Bruins	2 – 1	Edmonton Oilers		Mio	15,415	2–6–4	8	
13	November 7	Edmonton Oilers	3 – 5	Detroit Red Wings		Mio	12,197	2–7–4	8	
14	November 8	Edmonton Oilers	2 – 4	Boston Bruins		Dryden	9,859	2–8–4	8	
15	November 11	Toronto Maple Leafs	6 – 3	Edmonton Oilers		Mio	15,423	2–9–4	8	
16	November 13	Edmonton Oilers	5 – 3	Washington Capitals		Dryden	5,214	3–9–4	10	
17	November 15	Edmonton Oilers	3 – 5	Philadelphia Flyers		Dryden	17,077	3–10–4	10	
18	November 17	Edmonton Oilers	0 – 4	Hartford Whalers		Dryden	7,627	3–11–4	10	
19	November 18	Edmonton Oilers	7 – 9	Buffalo Sabres		Dryden	16,433	3–12–4	10	
20	November 21	Edmonton Oilers	4 – 4	Toronto Maple Leafs		Dryden	16,485	3–12–5	11	
21	November 24	Philadelphia Flyers	2 – 2	Edmonton Oilers		Dryden	15,423	3–12–6	12	
22	November 28	Chicago Black Hawks	2 – 4	Edmonton Oilers		Dryden	15,423	4–12–6	14	
23	November 30	New York Islanders	3 – 5	Edmonton Oilers		Mio	15,423	5–12–6	16	

December: 4–7–1 (home: 3–3–1; road: 1–4–0)

Game	Date	Visitor	Score	Home	OT	Decision	Attendance	Record	Pts	Recap
24	December 5	Edmonton Oilers	1 – 6	Minnesota North Stars		Mio	8,752	5–13–6	16	
25	December 7	Edmonton Oilers	3 – 8	Winnipeg Jets		Dryden	11,772	5–14–6	16	
26	December 9	Hartford Whalers	0 – 3	Edmonton Oilers		Mio	15,423	6–14–6	18	
27	December 12	Atlanta Flames	5 – 5	Edmonton Oilers		Mio	15,423	6–14–7	19	
28	December 14	Montreal Canadiens	3 – 5	Edmonton Oilers		Mio	15,423	7–14–7	21	
29	December 16	Winnipeg Jets	4 – 3	Edmonton Oilers		Mio	15,423	7–15–7	21	
30	December 19	Detroit Red Wings	6 – 4	Edmonton Oilers		Mio	15,423	7–16–7	21	
31	December 21	Edmonton Oilers	4 – 5	Colorado Rockies		Corsi	7,280	7–17–7	21	
32	December 22	Edmonton Oilers	3 – 9	Los Angeles Kings		Mio	9,384	7–18–7	21	
33	December 26	Colorado Rockies	3 – 4	Edmonton Oilers		Corsi	16,148	8–18–7	23	
34	December 28	Edmonton Oilers	5 – 3	Vancouver Canucks		Corsi	15,414	9–18–7	25	
35	December 30	Quebec Nordiques	2 – 1	Edmonton Oilers		Corsi	15,423	9–19–7	25	

January: 6–6–3 (home: 3–2–2; road: 3–4–1)

Game	Date	Visitor	Score	Home	OT	Decision	Attendance	Record	Pts	Recap
36	January 2	Hartford Whalers	3 – 3	Edmonton Oilers		Corsi	15,423	9–19–8	26	
37	January 5	Los Angeles Kings	3 – 3	Edmonton Oilers		Corsi	15,423	9–19–9	27	
38	January 7	Edmonton Oilers	3 – 4	Montreal Canadiens		Corsi	15,896	9–20–9	27	
39	January 9	Edmonton Oilers	2 – 3	Quebec Nordiques		Corsi	10,480	9–21–9	27	
40	January 11	New York Rangers	6 – 2	Edmonton Oilers		Mio	15,423	9–22–9	27	
41	January 13	Buffalo Sabres	5 – 6	Edmonton Oilers		Corsi	15,423	10–22–9	29	
42	January 16	Edmonton Oilers	5 – 2	Washington Capitals		Mio	9,352	11–22–9	31	
43	January 17	Edmonton Oilers	1 – 7	Boston Bruins		Corsi	10,047	11–23–9	31	
44	January 19	Edmonton Oilers	5 – 2	Pittsburgh Penguins		Mio	12,896	12–23–9	33	
45	January 20	Edmonton Oilers	4 – 4	Buffalo Sabres		Mio	16,433	12–23–10	34	
46	January 23	Pittsburgh Penguins	3 – 4	Edmonton Oilers		Mio	15,423	13–23–10	36	
47	January 26	Toronto Maple Leafs	3 – 8	Edmonton Oilers		Corsi	15,423	14–23–10	38	
48	January 27	Philadelphia Flyers	5 – 3	Edmonton Oilers		Corsi	15,423	14–24–10	38	
49	January 29	Edmonton Oilers	2 – 3	St. Louis Blues		Cutts	10,169	14–25–10	38	
50	January 30	Edmonton Oilers	8 – 1	Los Angeles Kings		Cutts	6,747	15–25–10	40	

February: 5–7–2 (home: 3–4–1; road: 2–3–1)

Game	Date	Visitor	Score	Home	OT	Decision	Attendance	Record	Pts	Recap
51	February 1	Winnipeg Jets	2 – 9	Edmonton Oilers		Corsi	15,423	16–25–10	42	
52	February 3	Los Angeles Kings	3 – 5	Edmonton Oilers		Corsi	15,423	17–25–10	44	
53	February 6	St. Louis Blues	6 – 3	Edmonton Oilers		Corsi	15,423	17–26–10	44	
54	February 8	Atlanta Flames	4 – 2	Edmonton Oilers		Cutts	15,423	17–27–10	44	
55	February 10	Edmonton Oilers	2 – 2	Winnipeg Jets		Cutts	11,588	17–27–11	45	
56	February 13	Edmonton Oilers	5 – 3	Minnesota North Stars		Corsi	10,126	18–27–11	47	
57	February 15	Washington Capitals	2 – 8	Edmonton Oilers		Corsi	15,423	19–27–11	49	
58	February 17	St. Louis Blues	5 – 5	Edmonton Oilers		Corsi	15,423	19–27–12	50	
59	February 19	Edmonton Oilers	2 – 6	Hartford Whalers		Mio	9,955	19–28–12	50	
60	February 20	Edmonton Oilers	1 – 4	New York Rangers		Corsi	17,417	19–29–12	50	
61	February 22	Edmonton Oilers	1 – 3	Colorado Rockies		Corsi	8,028	19–30–12	50	
62	February 24	Boston Bruins	4 – 2	Edmonton Oilers		Corsi	15,423	19–31–12	50	
63	February 27	Edmonton Oilers	5 – 2	Chicago Black Hawks		Mio	8,652	20–31–12	52	
64	February 29	Buffalo Sabres	4 – 2	Edmonton Oilers		Mio	15,423	20–32–12	52	

March: 7–6–0 (home: 3–2–0; road: 4–4–0)

Game	Date	Visitor	Score	Home	OT	Decision	Attendance	Record	Pts	Recap
65	March 1	Vancouver Canucks	5 – 2	Edmonton Oilers		Corsi	15,423	20–33–12	52	
66	March 4	Edmonton Oilers	4 – 6	New York Islanders		Corsi	14,408	20–34–12	52	
67	March 6	Edmonton Oilers	4 – 5	Montreal Canadiens		Corsi	16,981	20–35–12	52	
68	March 8	Edmonton Oilers	4 – 5	Pittsburgh Penguins		Corsi	10,660	20–36–12	52	
69	March 9	Edmonton Oilers	3 – 5	Philadelphia Flyers		Dupuis	17,077	20–37–12	52	
70	March 12	Edmonton Oilers	6 – 3	Quebec Nordiques		Low	10,619	21–37–12	54	
71	March 14	Chicago Black Hawks	4 – 6	Edmonton Oilers		Low	15,423	22–37–12	56	
72	March 15	Montreal Canadiens	7 – 3	Edmonton Oilers		Low	15,423	22–38–12	56	
73	March 19	New York Rangers	2 – 4	Edmonton Oilers		Low	15,423	23–38–12	58	
74	March 21	Pittsburgh Penguins	2 – 9	Edmonton Oilers		Low	15,423	24–38–12	60	
75	March 25	Edmonton Oilers	5 – 4	Atlanta Flames		Low	7,914	25–38–12	62	
76	March 26	Edmonton Oilers	5 – 2	Detroit Red Wings		Low	14,137	26–38–12	64	
77	March 29	Edmonton Oilers	8 – 5	Toronto Maple Leafs		Low	13,578	27–38–12	66	

April: 1–1–1 (home: 1–0–1; road: 0–1–0)

Game	Date	Visitor	Score	Home	OT	Decision	Attendance	Record	Pts	Recap
78	April 1	Edmonton Oilers	0 – 5	Vancouver Canucks		Low	16,413	27–39–12	66	
79	April 2	Minnesota North Stars	1 – 1	Edmonton Oilers		Low	15,423	27–39–13	67	
80	April 4	Colorado Rockies	2 – 6	Edmonton Oilers		Low	15,423	28–39–13	69	

Legend: Win (2 points) Loss (0 points) Tie (1 point)

== Playoffs ==
1980 Stanley Cup playoffs
Preliminary Round vs. (1) Philadelphia Flyers – Flyers win 3–0

Game	Date	Visitor	Score	Home	OT	Decision	Attendance	Series	Recap
1	April 8	Edmonton Oilers	3 – 4	Philadelphia Flyers	OT	Low	17,707	0–1	
2	April 9	Edmonton Oilers	1 – 5	Philadelphia Flyers		Low	17,707	0–2	
3	April 11	Philadelphia Flyers	3 – 2	Edmonton Oilers	2OT	Low	15,423	0–3	

Legend: Win Loss

== Player statistics ==
=== Scoring leaders ===
Player	GP	G	A	Pts	PIM
Wayne Gretzky	79	51	86	137	21
Blair MacDonald	80	46	48	94	6
Stan Weir	79	33	33	66	40
Brett Callighen	59	23	35	58	72
Dave Lumley	80	20	38	58	138

=== Goaltending ===
Player	GP	TOI	W	L	T	GA	SO	GAA
Ron Low	11	650	8	2	1	37	0	3.42
Don Cutts	6	269	1	2	1	16	0	3.57
Jim Corsi	26	1366	8	14	3	83	0	3.65
Bob Dupuis	1	60	0	1	0	4	0	4.00
Eddie Mio	34	1711	9	13	5	120	1	4.21
Dave Dryden	14	744	2	7	3	53	0	4.27

Playoff stats

=== Scoring leaders ===
Player	GP	G	A	Pts	PIM
Wayne Gretzky	3	2	1	3	0
Mark Messier	3	1	2	3	2
Blair MacDonald	3	0	3	3	0
Don Murdoch	3	2	0	2	0
Brett Callighen	3	0	2	2	0

=== Goaltending ===
Player	GP	TOI	W	L	GA	SO	GAA
Ron Low	3	212	0	3	12	0	3.40

== Awards and records ==
- Wayne Gretzky – Hart Memorial Trophy

=== Milestones ===
Regular Season
Player	Milestone	Reached
Brett Callighen	1st NHL Game; 1st NHL Assist; 1st NHL Point	October 10, 1979
Wayne Gretzky	1st NHL Game; 1st NHL Assist; 1st NHL Point	October 10, 1979
Ron Chipperfield	1st NHL Game	October 10, 1979
Peter Driscoll	1st NHL Game	October 10, 1979
Blair MacDonald	1st NHL Game	October 10, 1979
Mark Messier	1st NHL Game	October 10, 1979
Dave Semenko	1st NHL Game	October 10, 1979
Risto Siltanen	1st NHL Game	October 10, 1979
Dave Hunter	1st NHL Game; 1st NHL Goal; 1st NHL Point	October 10, 1979
Kevin Lowe	1st NHL Game; 1st NHL Goal; 1st NHL Point	October 10, 1979
Dave Lumley	1st NHL Assist; 1st NHL Point	October 10, 1979
Blair MacDonald	1st NHL Goal; 1st NHL Point	October 13, 1979
Mark Messier	1st NHL Goal; 1st NHL Point	October 13, 1979
Eddie Mio	1st NHL Game	October 13, 1979
Dave Semenko	1st NHL Assist; 1st NHL Point	October 13, 1979
Stan Weir	200th NHL Point	October 13, 1979
Colin Campbell	300th NHL Game	October 14, 1979
Bill Flett	500th NHL PIM	October 14, 1979
Wayne Gretzky	1st NHL Goal	October 14, 1979
Blair MacDonald	1st NHL Assist	October 14, 1979
Risto Siltanen	1st NHL Goal; 1st NHL Point	October 14, 1979
Brett Callighen	1st NHL Goal	October 19, 1979
Ron Chipperfield	1st NHL Assist; 1st NHL Point	October 19, 1979
Blair MacDonald	1st NHL Hat-trick	October 19, 1979
Mark Messier	1st NHL Assist	October 19, 1979
Eddie Mio	1st NHL Win	October 19, 1979
Dave Hunter; Risto Siltanen	1st NHL Assist	October 21, 1979
Ron Areshenkoff	1st NHL Game	October 23, 1979
Colin Campbell	600th NHL PIM	October 23, 1979
Peter Driscoll	1st NHL Goal; 1st NHL Point	October 23, 1979
Peter Driscoll	1st NHL Assist	October 26, 1979
Dave Semenko	1st NHL Goal	October 26, 1979
Bill Flett	200th NHL Goal	October 28, 1979
Ron Chipperfield	1st NHL Goal	October 30, 1979
Mike Toal	1st NHL Game	October 30, 1979
Kari Makkonen	1st NHL Game	November 7, 1979
John Bednarski	100th NHL Game	November 8, 1979
Bryon Baltimore	1st NHL Game	November 13, 1979
Dave Dryden	200th NHL Game	November 21, 1979
Kevin Lowe	1st NHL Assist	November 30, 1979
Pat Price	200th NHL Game	November 30, 1979
Kari Makkonen	1st NHL Assist; 1st NHL Point	December 7, 1979
Stan Weir	400th NHL Game	December 7, 1979
Eddie Mio	1st NHL Shutout	December 9, 1979
Kari Makkonen	1st NHL Goal	December 12, 1979
Eddie Mio	1st NHL Assist; 1st NHL Point	December 19, 1979
Jim Corsi	1st NHL Game	December 21, 1979
Jim Corsi	1st NHL Win	December 26, 1979
Jim Corsi	1st NHL Assist; 1st NHL Point	January 7, 1980
Stan Weir	100th NHL Goal	January 7, 1980
Doug Hicks	100th NHL Point	January 13, 1980
Blair MacDonald	2nd NHL Hat-trick	January 19, 1980
Doug Hicks	400th NHL Game	January 20, 1980
Blair MacDonald	3rd NHL Hat-trick	January 26, 1980
Don Cutts	1st NHL Game; 1st NHL Win	January 30, 1980
Dave Semenko	100th NHL PIM	January 30, 1980
Cam Connor	100th NHL PIM	February 1, 1980
Wayne Gretzky	1st NHL Hat-trick	February 1, 1980
Dave Lumley	100th NHL PIM	February 6, 1980
Stan Weir	100th NHL PIM	February 6, 1980
Colin Campbell	700th NHL PIM	February 13, 1980
Lee Fogolin	500th NHL PIM	February 15, 1980
Blair MacDonald	4th NHL Hat-trick	February 15, 1980
Wayne Gretzky	100th NHL Point	February 24, 1980
Ron Carter	1st NHL Game	February 27, 1980
Pat Price	200th NHL PIM	March 4, 1980
Bob Dupuis	1st NHL Game	March 9, 1980
Lee Fogolin	400th NHL Game	March 14, 1980
Wayne Gretzky	2nd NHL Hat-trick; 1st NHL Natural Hat-trick	March 21, 1980
Dave Semenko	1st NHL Gordie Howe hat trick	March 21, 1980
Don Ashby	1st NHL Hat-trick	March 29, 1980
Wayne Gretzky	50th Goal in 79 Games	April 2, 1980
Dave Hunter	100th NHL PIM	April 2, 1980

Playoffs
Player	Milestone	Reached
Brett Callighen	1st NHL Game; 1st NHL Assist; 1st NHL Point	April 8, 1980
Blair MacDonald	1st NHL Game; 1st NHL Assist; 1st NHL Point	April 8, 1980
Mark Messier	1st NHL Game; 1st NHL Assist; 1st NHL Point	April 8, 1980
Wayne Gretzky	1st NHL Game; 1st NHL Goal; 1st NHL Assist; 1st NHL Point	April 8, 1980
Peter Driscoll	1st NHL Game	April 8, 1980
Dave Hunter	1st NHL Game	April 8, 1980
Ron Low	1st NHL Game	April 8, 1980
Kevin Lowe	1st NHL Game	April 8, 1980
Dave Semenko	1st NHL Game	April 8, 1980
Dave Lumley	1st NHL Game; 1st NHL Goal; 1st NHL Point	April 8, 1980
Kevin Lowe	1st NHL Assist; 1st NHL Point	April 9, 1980
Risto Siltanen	1st NHL Game	April 9, 1980
Mark Messier	1st NHL Goal	April 11, 1980

== Transactions ==
=== Trades ===
Date	Details	
June 1, 1979	To Winnipeg Jets^Peter Marsh	To Edmonton Oilers Mats Ulander
June 9, 1979	To Minnesota North Stars *Paul Shmyr	To Edmonton Oilers 4th-round pick in 1979 – Glenn Anderson
June 13, 1979	To Montreal Canadiens 2nd-round pick in 1980 – Ric Nattress	To Edmonton Oilers Dave Lumley; Dan Newman
August 7, 1979	To St. Louis Blues Joe Micheletti	To Edmonton Oilers Tom Roulston; Risto Siltanen
August 9, 1979	To Minnesota North Stars 2nd-round pick in 1979 – Neal Broten; 3rd-round pick in 1979 – Kevin Maxwell	To Edmonton Oilers Dave Semenko; 3rd-round pick in 1979 – Mark Messier
August 22, 1979	To Toronto Maple Leafs Reg Thomas	To Edmonton Oilers 6th-round pick in 1981 – Steve Smith
September 24, 1979	To Chicago Black Hawks Future considerations	To Edmonton Oilers Jim Harrison
November 13, 1979	To Buffalo Sabres John Gould	To Edmonton Oilers Alec Tidey
December 10, 1979	To Boston Bruins Dan Newman	To Edmonton Oilers Bobby Schmautz
February 25, 1980	To Colorado Rockies Bobby Schmautz	To Edmonton Oilers Don Ashby
March 11, 1980	To Minnesota North Stars Jim Corsi	To Edmonton Oilers Cash
March 11, 1980	To New York Rangers Cam Connor; 3rd-round pick in 1981 – Peter Sundstrom	To Edmonton Oilers Don Murdoch
March 11, 1980	To Quebec Nordiques Ron Chipperfield	To Edmonton Oilers Ron Low

^Oilers promised not to select Peter Marsh in the 1979 WHA Dispersal Draft
*Oilers promised to not make Paul Shmyr one of its priority selections in the 1979 NHL expansion draft

=== Rights retained prior to Expansion Draft ===
Player	Team
Claire Alexander	Vancouver Canucks
Garnet Bailey	Washington Capitals
George Buat	Boston Bruins
Ron Carter	Montreal Canadiens
Dave Hunter	Montreal Canadiens
Joe Micheletti	Montreal Canadiens
Ed Walsh	Montreal Canadiens
Ron Chipperfield	Philadelphia Flyers
Peter Driscoll	Toronto Maple Leafs
Bill Flett	Atlanta Flames
Pierre Guité	Detroit Red Wings
Al Hamilton	Buffalo Sabres
Blair MacDonald	Los Angeles Kings
Mark Miller	Pittsburgh Penguins

=== Players acquired ===
Date	Player	Former team	Term
June 9, 1979	Kari Makkonen	New York Islanders	1-year
July 15, 1979	John Bednarski	New York Rangers	
July 18, 1979	Clayton Pachal	Colorado Rockies	
September 14, 1979	Charlie Huddy	Oshawa Generals (OHL)	
September 14, 1979	Cal Roadhouse	Billings Bighorns (WHL)	
October 4, 1979	Jim Corsi	Quebec Nordiques	
November 1, 1979	Jim Crosson	Calgary Wranglers (WHL)	
November 1, 1979	Gord Stafford	Billings Bighorns (WHL)	
November 2, 1979	Poul Popiel	Innsbrucker EV (AUT)	
January 12, 1980	Don Cutts	New York Islanders	
January 30, 1980	Roy Sommer	Toronto Maple Leafs	
March 2, 1980	Bob Dupuis	Barrie Flyers (OHA Sr A Hockey League)	
March 5, 1980	Mike Kouwenhoven	Feenstra Flyers (Eredivisie)	
March 17, 1980	Owen Lloyd	Spokane Flyers (WIHL)	

=== Players lost ===
Date	Player	New team
	Dave Forbes	Retired
	Jim Harrison	Retired
	Ernie Wakely	Retired
	Bryan Watson	Retired
	Inge Hammarström	Brynäs IF (SHL)
August 8, 1979	Dennis Patterson	Philadelphia Flyers
August 16, 1979	Pierre Guité	Released
September 19, 1979	Larry Hendrick	Released
October 1979	Doug Favell	Released
October 18, 1979	Pete LoPresti	Retired
December 12, 1979	Bill Flett	Retired
December 22, 1979	Dave Dryden	Retired
December 27, 1979	John Bednarski	Detroit Red Wings

=== Claimed via waivers ===
Date	Player	Team
March 1980	John Hilworth	from Detroit Red Wings

=== Signings ===
Date	Player	Term
July 18, 1979	Bryon Baltimore	
August 3, 1979	Lee Fogolin	3-year
August 21, 1979	Dave Semenko	2-year
August 30, 1979	Kevin Lowe	4-year
September 14, 1979	Mark Messier	2-year
October 5, 1979	Max Kostovich	
October 5, 1979	Dave Lumley	
October 5, 1979	Mike Toal	
May 14, 1980	Blair Barnes	

== Draft picks ==
Edmonton's draft picks at the 1979 NHL entry draft:

Round	#	Player	Nationality	College/Junior/Club team (League)
1	21	Kevin Lowe	Canada	Quebec Remparts (QMJHL)
3	48	Mark Messier	Canada	Cincinnati Stingers (WHA)
4	69	Glenn Anderson	Canada	Denver Pioneers (WCHA)
4	84	Max Kostovich	Canada	Portland Winter Hawks (WHL)
5	105	Mike Toal	Canada	Portland Winter Hawks (WHL)
6	126	Blair Barnes	Canada	Windsor Spitfires (OMJHL)

=== Expansion draft picks ===
Edmonton's expansion draft picks at the 1979 NHL expansion draft

Pick	Nationality	Player	Pos	Age	Drafted From	GP	G	A	PTS	PIM	W	L	T	GAA
1	(United States)	Pete LoPresti	G	25	Minnesota North Stars	173	0	3	3	6	43	101	20	4.06
2	(Canada)	Doug Favell	G	34	Colorado Rockies	373	0	8	8	152	123	153	69	3.17
3	(Canada)	Cam Connor	RW	24	Montreal Canadiens	23	1	3	4	39	—	—	—	—
4	(Canada)	Lee Fogolin	D	24	Buffalo Sabres	329	8	68	76	424	—	—	—	—
5	(Canada)	Pat Price	D	24	New York Islanders	182	8	45	53	104	—	—	—	—
6	(Canada)	Colin Campbell	D	26	Pittsburgh Penguins	297	17	60	77	584	—	—	—	—
7	(Canada)	Larry Brown	D	32	Los Angeles Kings	455	7	53	60	180	—	—	—	—
8	(Canada)	Ron Areshenkoff	C	22	Buffalo Sabres	—	—	—	—	—	—	—	—	—
9	(Sweden)	Inge Hammarstrom	LW	31	St. Louis Blues	427	116	123	239	98	—	—	—	—
10	(Canada)	John Gould	RW	30	Atlanta Flames	452	122	129	251	103	—	—	—	—
11	(Canada)	Doug Hicks	D	24	Chicago Black Hawks	357	20	63	83	241	—	—	—	—
12	(Canada)	Tom Edur	D	24	Pittsburgh Penguins	158	17	70	87	67	—	—	—	—
13	(Canada)	Wayne Bianchin	LW	25	Pittsburgh Penguins	264	68	41	109	137	—	—	—	—
14	(Canada)	Mike Forbes	D	21	Boston Bruins	32	0	4	4	15	—	—	—	—
15	(Canada)	Doug Patey	RW	22	Washington Capitals	45	4	2	6	8	—	—	—	—
16	(Canada)	Bob Kelly	LW	33	Chicago Black Hawks	425	87	109	196	687	—	—	—	—

==== Trades ====
- The Montreal Canadiens traded Dave Hunter and Ron Carter in exchange for Edmonton not to select Bill Nyrop, Gilles Lupien, or Rod Langway.
- The Toronto Maple Leafs traded Stan Weir in exchange for Edmonton not to select Ron Ellis.

== See also ==
- 1979–80 NHL season
