= 1979 WHA playoffs =

WHA postseason tournament

Tournament details
- Dates: April 21 – May 20, 1979
- Teams: 5
- Defending champions: Winnipeg Jets

Final positions
- Champions: Winnipeg Jets (3rd title)
- Runners-up: Edmonton Oilers

Tournament statistics
- Scoring leader(s): Wayne Gretzky (Oilers) (20 points)

Awards
- MVP: Rich Preston (Jets)

The 1979 WHA playoffs was the postseason tournament of the World Hockey Association's 1978–79 WHA season. The seventh and final tournament concluded with five of the surviving six teams competing for the Avco World Trophy; the merger between the WHA and the National Hockey League loomed ahead after the announcement of a merger in late March, with the four teams to move to the NHL already selected. The playoff format was announced in January 1979. The playoffs were threatened to not be played entirely due to a dispute over the playoff pool in which the league wanted to cut the pool to $88,000 less than last year due to less games being played. It was noted at the time that the original WHA playoff pool was at one point $740,000 but now was considerably less than that; the dispute was tabled to after the playoffs. The playoff teams and seeding were not fully determined until nearly the final game of the regular season, as Peter Sullivan's overtime goal gave the Winnipeg Jets the victory over Birmingham Bulls on April 15, 1979 that clinched the third seed for Winnipeg and also eliminated the Bulls from having the final seed in the playoffs in favor of the Cincinnati Stingers; the Jets win made the outcome of the game played the following day with the fourth-place New England Whalers moot.

Among the notable events, phenom Wayne Gretzky made his first playoff appearance as a professional player as the Edmonton Oilers raced all the way to the Avco Cup Final. Winnipeg lost the entire "Hot Line" of Bobby Hull (who played a total of four games), Anders Hedberg & Ulf Nilsson (who each left for the NHL), which had scored 146 combined goals the previous season and even replaced their Avco Cup champion coach (Larry Hillman) after 61 games for Tom McVie. Team captain Lars-Erik Sjoberg played just nine games due to a torn Achilles tendon that he suffered in the preseason. The Jets were bolstered by the acquisition of several players from the liquidated Houston Aeros such as Rich Preston, Morris Lukowich, and Terry Ruskowski. Gary Smith was a late addition to the team, having gone from going winless in eleven starts with the extinct Indianapolis Racers to playing 11 games to end the season for the Jets on his way to being tabbed as the goaltender for their playoff run. The New England Whalers, still without the services of the Hartford Civic Center, played their last games as "New England" at the Springfield Civic Center while the Cincinnati Stingers played their last games as a franchise.

For only the second time in WHA history and first since 1976, the team with the best regular season record failed to win the championship. The Winnipeg Jets completed their WHA dynasty with their third championship in four seasons, doing so over the regular season champion Edmonton Oilers in the Avco Cup Final. Rookie Wayne Gretzky led the playoffs in points with 20 on the strength of ten goals for the Oilers, which was only matched by Willy Lindstrom of the Jets, who had ten goals in ten games. In Game 5 of the Avco Cup Final, Ron Chipperfield scored five goals to set the new WHA record for goals scored in a postseason game as the Oilers forced a Game 6 with a 10–2 victory. In Game 6, the Jets scored five goals in the first two periods and dominated their way to a 7–3 win on home ice to complete the WHA. Dave Semenko of the Oilers scored the final goal in WHA history, doing so with twelve seconds left in the third period.

Rich Preston of the Jets was the final person awarded the WHA Playoff MVP.

== Playoff seeds ==
1. Edmonton Oilers, regular season champions – 98 points
2. Quebec Nordiques – 87 points
3. Winnipeg Jets – 84 points
4. New England Whalers – 83 points
5. Cincinnati Stingers – 72 points

== Bracket ==
Quarterfinals
4	New England Whalers	2
5	Cincinnati Stingers	1

Semifinals
1	Edmonton Oilers	4
4	New England Whalers	3
2	Quebec Nordiques	0
3	Winnipeg Jets	4

Finals
1	Edmonton Oilers	2
3	Winnipeg Jets	4

== Quarterfinals ==
In the regular season, Cincinnati had gone 7–6–2 against New England. In Game 1, Mark Howe led the way for the Whalers with two goals, with his late third-period goal giving New England the go-ahead win. In Game 2, Jamie Hislop tied a WHA playoff record with four assists as the Stingers scored five goals before the second period was even half over, with three of them being from Robbie Ftorek. The Whalers took out John Garrett in the third period for Al Smith and got a few goals in the third.

In Game 3, the two teams traded goals in the first period before Blaine Stoughton gave New England the lead with 17 seconds to play in the second period on his goal. The two teams held firm for a scoreless third period as New England eliminated Cincinnati.

April 21	Cincinnati Stingers	3–5 (1–0, 0-2, 2–3)	New England Whalers	Springfield Civic Center; Attendance: 5,922

Box score
Mike Liut	Goalies	John Garrett
3:57 (1st) – Michel Parizeau; 1:33 (3rd) – Byron Shutt; 13:30 (3rd) – Jamie Hislop / Goals / 4:36 (2nd) – Mark Howe; 15:52 (2nd) – Blaine Stoughton; 2:38 (3rd) – Andre Lacroix; 3:09 (3rd) – Mark Howe; 15:57 (3rd) – Mike Rogers
26	Shots	39

Game summary
Cincinnati shots on goal: 26 (8–9–9); New England shots on goal: 39 (13–15–11)

April 22	New England Whalers	3–6 (0–3, 1–2, 2–1)	Cincinnati Stingers	Riverfront Coliseum; Attendance: 5,131

Box score
John Garrett / Al Smith	Goalies	Mike Liut
17:31 (2nd) – Mike Rogers; 9:08 (3rd) – Gordie Howe; 9:47 (3rd) – Mike Antonovich / Goals / 6:14 (1st) – Reg Thomas; 7:34 (1st) – Peter Marsh; 10:05 (1st) – Robbie Ftorek; 1:19 (2nd) – Robbie Ftorek; 17:47 (3rd) – Bill Gilligan
32 (7–9–16)	Shots	28 (13–7–8)

Game summary
New England shots on goal: 32 (7–9–16); Cincinnati shots on goal: 28 (13–7–8)

April 24	Cincinnati Stingers	1–2 (1–1, 0–1, 0–0)	New England Whalers	Springfield Civic Center; Attendance: 5,492

Box score
Mike Liut	Goalies	Al Smith
5:16 (1st) – Jamie Hislop / Goals / 9:26 (1st) – John McKenzie; 19:43 (2nd) – Blaine Stoughton
33	Shots	34

Game summary
Cincinnati shots on goal: 33 (10–11–12)

New England shots on goal: 34 (7–18–9)

== Semifinals ==
=== (2) Winnipeg Jets vs. (3) Quebec Nordiques ===
In the fourteen regular season contests, the teams went 6–6–2 against each other.

In Game 1, each team scored in the final three minutes of the period, with Lyle Moffat's tip-in goal for Winnipeg being followed by Marc Tardif scoring 29 seconds later for Quebec. But Winnipeg scored five goals in the second period (with Bobby Guindon scoring two of them) before Quebec could even get one on the board. Quebec scored a goal in the third period but were stymied in the third period to just five shots as Jets goaltender Gary Smith stopped 28 of 31 shots. The last couple of minutes saw a commotion as Gilles Bilodeau (nicknamed "Bad News") was deployed on the ice and quickly went out on the ice and put his stick onto Winnipeg players, even hitting Scott Campbell in the mouth that saw the latter lose his temper. Nordiques head coach Jacques Demers stated that he didn't send Bilodeau out there to hit players but merely because he was missing three forwards, citing a sore back for Real Cloutier, an aggravated knee for Serge Bernier and a hurt shoulder for Paulin Bordeleau.

With 7:09 remaining in the third period, Willy Lindstrom scored to close out the scoring for Winnipeg and also set a record for most points in a four-game series, having collected six goals and four assists (the previous record was shared by Gordie Howe, Ulf Nilsson, and Reg Thomas. The Jets also set a record for most goals in a four-game sweep with 30.

April 23	Winnipeg Jets	6–3 (1–1, 5–1, 0–1)	Quebec Nordiques	Colisée de Québec; Attendance: 8,539

Box score
Gary Smith	Goalies	Richard Brodeur / Jim Corsi
17:10 (1st) – Lyle Moffat; 2:25 (2nd) – Rich Preston; 4:16 (2nd) – Bobby Guindon; 11:06 (2nd) – Morris Lukowich; 13:53 (2nd) – Bobby Guindon; 18:12 (2nd) – Willy Lindstrom / Goals / 17:39 (1st) – Marc Tardif; 16:44 (2nd) – Marc Tardif; 18:16 (3rd) – Bob Fitchner
30 (8–12–10)	Shots	31 (14–12–5)

April 25	Winnipeg Jets	9–2 (3–0, 3–1, 3–1)	Quebec Nordiques	Colisée de Québec; Attendance: 9,125

Box score
Gary Smith / Joe Daley	Goalies	Jim Corsi / Richard Brodeur
7:24 (1st) – Rich Preston; 16:17 (1st) – Steve West; 18:45 (1st) – Lars-Erik Sjoberg; 11:38 (2nd) – Peter Sullivan; 12:50 (2nd) – Morris Lukowich; 15:07 (2nd) – Paul MacKinnon; 11:33 (3rd) – Willy Lindstrom; 15:06 (3rd) – Glenn Hicks; 19:33 (3rd) – Willy Lindstrom / Goals / 5:09 (2nd) – Marc Tardif; 13:20 (3rd) – Marc Tardif
32 (14–9–9)	Shots	23 (3–8–12)

April 27	Quebec Nordiques	5–9 (1–2, 3–2, 1–5)	Winnipeg Jets	Winnipeg Arena; Attendance: 8,209

Box score
Jean-Louis Levasseur	Goalies	Gary Smith
3:16 (1st) – Real Cloutier; 4:52 (2nd) – Curt Brackenbury; 6:00 (2nd) – Danny Geoffrion; 18:44 (2nd) – Paulin Bordeleau; 17:00 (3rd) – Marc Tardif / Goals / 6:21 (1st) – Rich Preston; 19:14 (1st) – Steve West; 12:02 (2nd) – Paul Terbenche; 13:38 (2nd) – Peter Sullivan; 0:49 (3rd) – Rich Preston; 13:45 (3rd) – Peter Sullivan; 14:15 (3rd) – Roland Eriksson; 14:33 (3rd) – Morris Lukowich; 18:07 (3rd) – Willy Lindstrom
30 (9–11–10)	Shots	39 (17–11–11)

April 29	Quebec Nordiques	2–6 (1–1, 0–3, 1–2)	Winnipeg Jets	Winnipeg Arena; Attendance: 10,168

Box score
Richard Brodeur	Goalies	Gary Smith
15:04 (1st) – Marc Tardif; 15:59 (3rd) – Real Cloutier / Goals / 16:17 (1st) – Morris Lukowich; 0:37 (2nd) – Willy Lindstrom; 1:39 (2nd) – Terry Ruskowski; 11:18 (2nd) – Kent Nilsson; 2:25 (3rd) – Peter Sullivan; 12:51 (3rd) – Willy Lindstrom
14 (4–4–6)	Shots	50 (17–16–17)

=== (1) Edmonton Oilers vs. (4) New England Whalers ===
The favored Oilers had gone 9–4–1 against the Whalers in the regular season (while winning eight of the last nine).

However, the home team wound up winning each game in a tight series that went the distance. Wayne Gretzky had 15 points in the series, a record for a seven-game playoff and the most for a WHA semifinal in history. Edmonton scored 34 goals in the series and New England scored 30 to combine for 64, also a record for a seven-game series that topped the previous mark of the 1974 Semifinal.

April 26	New England Whalers	2–6 (1–0, 0-3, 1-3)	Edmonton Oilers	Northlands Coliseum; Attendance: 11,102

Box score
Al Smith	Goalies	Dave Dryden
17:27 (1st) – Gordie Howe; 14:58 (3rd) – Larry Pleau / Goals / 5:21 (2nd) – Blair MacDonald; 11:44 (2nd) – Steve Carlson; 12:08 (2nd) – Dennis Sobchuk; 3:38 (3rd) – Blair MacDonald; 11:05 (3rd) – Stan Weir; 17:06 (3rd) – Blair MacDonald
21 (5–7–9)	Shots	29 (9–11–9)

April 27	New England Whalers	5–9 (2–4, 1–2, 2–3)	Edmonton Oilers	Northlands Coliseum; Attendance: 13,349

Box score
Al Smith / John Garrett	Goalies	Dave Dryden
0:32 (1st) – Mike Antonovich; 12:51 (1st) – Gordie Howe; 3:42 (2nd) – Al Hangsleben; 8:24 (3rd) – Larry Pleau; 8:43 (3rd) – Mark Howe / Goals / 4:18 (1st) – Wayne Gretzky; 4:26 (1st) – Dave Semenko; 6:55 (1st) – Bill Flett; 9:17 (1st) – Blair MacDonald; 9:03 (2nd) – Brett Callighen; 12:35 (2nd) – Brett Callighen; 3:50 (3rd) – Al Hamilton; 4:33 (3rd) – Dave Semenko; 9:31 (3rd) – Brett Callighen
27 (9–11–7)	Shots	39 (15–11–13)

April 29	Edmonton Oilers	1–4 (1–2, 0–0, 0–2)	New England Whalers	Springfield Civic Center; Attendance: 5,571

Box score
Dave Dryden	Goalies	John Garrett
3:49 (1st) – Wayne Gretzky / Goals / 14:32 (1st) – Mark Howe; 15:56 (1st) – George Lyle; 16:15 (3rd) – George Lyle; 19:24 (3rd) – Dave Keon
23 (10–7–6)	Shots	17 (10–0–7)

May 1	Edmonton Oilers	4–5 (1–0, 1–4, 2–1)	New England Whalers	Springfield Civic Center; Attendance: 5,492

Box score
Dave Dryden	Goalies	John Garrett
5:44 (1st) – Wayne Gretzky; 1:31 (2nd) – Ron Chipperfield; 0:36 (3rd) – Bill Flett; 6:36 (3rd) – Blair MacDonald / Goals / 0:39 (2nd) – Jordy Douglas; 6:57 (2nd) – Jordy Douglas; 11:12 (2nd) – George Lyle; 17:22 (2nd) – Andre Lacroix; 17:48 (3rd) – John McKenzie
27 (3–14–10)	Shots	30 (13–10–7)

May 3	New England Whalers	2–5 (0–2, 0–1, 2–2)	Edmonton Oilers	Northlands Coliseum; Attendance: 11,401

Box score
John Garrett	Goalies	Dave Dryden
2:03 (3rd) – John McKenzie; 13:12 (3rd) – Jordy Douglas / Goals / 14:57 (1st) – Wayne Gretzky; 15:31 (1st) – Paul Shmyr; 2:12 (1st) – Wayne Gretzky; 14:56 (3rd) – Dave Hunter; 19:19 (3rd) – Wayne Gretzky
21 (3–8–10)	Shots	30 (8–10–12)

May 6	Edmonton Oilers	4–8 (0–4, 2–2, 2–2)	New England Whalers	Springfield Civic Center; Attendance: 7,320

Box score
Dave Dryden / Eddie Mio	Goalies	John Garrett
13:36 (2nd) – Al Hamilton; 19:33 (2nd) – Dennis Sobchuk; 5:48 (3rd) – Blair MacDonald; 12:46 (3rd) – Dave Semenko / Goals / 2:07 (1st) – Ron Plumb; 12:50 (1st) – Blaine Stoughton; 13:57 (1st) – Jordy Douglas; 18:32 (1st) – Mike Antonovich; 5:10 (2nd) – Dave Keon; 19:54 (2nd) – Dave Keon; 5:00 (3rd) – Andre Lacroix; 19:49 (3rd) – Mike Antonovich
32 (9–12–11)	Shots	35 (13–13–9)

May 8	New England Whalers	3–6 (1–2, 0–4, 2–0)	Edmonton Oilers	Northlands Coliseum; Attendance: 13,385

Box score
John Garrett	Goalies	Dave Dryden
8:37 (1st) – Andre Lacroix; 9:09 (3rd) – Blaine Stoughton; 18:43 (3rd) – Mike Antonovich / Goals / 6:27 (1st) – Blair MacDonald; 13:27 (1st) – Dennis Sobchuk; 6:20 (2nd) – Ron Chipperfield; 10:14 (2nd) – Bill Flett; 12:44 (2nd) – Wayne Gretzky; 15:51 (2nd) – Wayne Gretzky
25 (8–3–14)	Shots	29 (11–14–4)

== Avco Cup Final ==
=== (1) Edmonton Oilers vs. (3) Winnipeg Jets ===
The series matched the Edmonton Oilers, as coached by Glen Sather against the Winnipeg Jets, as coached by Tom McVie. In fourteen regular season matchups, each team won seven times. With the layoff between playoff series, Winnipeg formulated a potential game plan for Gretzky by Lars-Erik Sjöberg and McVie to try and chase him out as often as possible so he would have to pass the puck on his backhand rather than his forehand, which is where Sjöberg would meet him.

Winnipeg prevailed in the first two games in Edmonton with tight battles. 11,871 fans watched the first Avco Cup championship game in Edmonton. In Game 1, Rich Preston gave them the lead three minutes into Game 1 on his goal before Bill Lesuk gave the Jets a 2–0 lead on his goal eleven minutes later. Bill Flett scored for Edmonton with 2:12 remaining in the first period on a shot from the corner that bounced of the heel of Gary Smith's stick and into the net. Preston added in a second goal with 3:36 remaining in the third period. In Game 2 (with 11,405 attending fans), the Oilers led in the second period on a Dennis Sobchuk goal, but the Jets scored three goals, with Willy Lindstrom breaking the 2–2 tie with 4:36 remaining in regulation. For the next two games in Winnipeg, the two teams split victories. The road team won again with Game 3, now in Winnipeg (with 9,130 attending fans) that saw eight different players score for the Oilers in an 8–3 victory; it was the first time Winnipeg had lost a playoff game since Game 3 of the 1978 WHA Quarterfinals, a streak of 12 games.

On the day of Game 4, Oilers goaltender Dave Dryden was named the final recipient of the Gordie Howe Trophy for most valuable player in the season. Also announced was the First and Second Team honors, which saw the Jets have one player receive honors with Morris Lukowich as Second Team for left wing while Edmonton had Dryden for First Team and four players on the Second Team with Paul Shmyr (D), Dave Langevin (D), Wayne Gretzky (C), and Blair MacDonald (RW). Later that day to 10,295 fans in Winnipeg, the two teams each scored a goal in the first period before Oilers took a 2–1 lead into the third period on a goal by Brett Callighen. Morris Lukowich tied the game for the Jets nine minutes into the third period on a power-play goal before Lyle Moffat scored the go-ahead goal with 6:26 remaining in the game.

Now trailing 3–1 in the series, the Oilers returned to Edmonton to a crowd of 13,308 and rocked the Jets early with four goals in the first period on their way to a 10–2 victory, which notably saw Ron Chipperfield score five goals while Winnipeg's Terry Ruskowski injured his shoulder. Winnipeg took out goaltender Gary Smith 10:45 into the second period for Joe Daley. 32 total penalties (26 minors) were issued during the game. 10,195 people saw what would end up being the final WHA game when the Jets played the Oilers in Game 6 on May 20, 1979. The Oilers would miss the services of Dennis Sobchuk, who contracted food poisoning when eating a steak sandwich at a Winnipeg restaurant, while Ruskowski returned from his one-game absence, later crediting team trainer Bill Bozak for his aid. The Jets held court from the get-go, with Willy Lindstrom giving the Jets an early lead two minutes into the game on a goal. After being up 2–0 in the first period, the Jets then scored three goals in the span of four minutes to rocket up to a 5–0 lead, with Lyle Moffat having the series-clinching goal at 6:35 in the period. Three players led the Jets in goals for the series with four by Rich Preston, Morris Lukowich, and Willy Lindstrom. This was the first and only time that the Avco World Trophy was won by a team that did not finish first or second for points in the league. A parade was held on May 22 in downtown Winnipeg.

May 11	Winnipeg Jets	3–1	Edmonton Oilers	Northlands Coliseum	Recap
3:29 – Rich Preston (Sullivan); 15:23 – Bill Lesuk (Eriksson, Moffat)		First period	17:48 – Bill Flett (Shmyr)
No scoring		Second period	No scoring
16:24 – Rich Preston (Nilsson)		Third period	No scoring
Gary Smith 23 saves / 24 shots		Goalie stats	Dave Dryden 25 saves / 28 shots

May 13	Winnipeg Jets	3–2	Edmonton Oilers	Northlands Coliseum	Recap
No scoring		First period	No scoring
No scoring		Second period	6:12 – Dennis Sobchuk (Driscoll)
1:17 – Peter Sullivan (Terbenche); 11:53 – Morris Lukowich (Campbell, Ruskowski); 15:24 – Willy Lindstrom (Long, Lukowich)		Third period	4:10 – Al Hamilton
Gary Smith 19 saves / 21 shots		Goalie stats	Dave Dryden 24 saves / 27 shots

May 15	Edmonton Oilers	8–3	Winnipeg Jets	Winnipeg Arena	Recap
9:03 – Al Hamilton (Gretzky); 9:44 – Peter Driscoll (Goldsworthy); 12:45 – Ron Chipperfield (Shymr, Driscoll); 16:01 – Bill Goldsworthy (Hamilton, Chipperfield)		First period	4:54 – Morris Lukowich (Ruskowski, Nilsson); 15:53 – Willy Lindstrom
No scoring		Second period	11:56 – Morris Lukowich (MacKinnon, Eriksson)
1:42 – Blair MacDonald (Risto Siltanen); 4:14 – Brett Callighen (MacDonald, Gretzky); 9:52 – Bengt Gustafsson (Hunter, Weir); 11:00 – Dave Hunter (Gustafsson, Hamilton)		Third period	No scoring
Dave Dryden 23 saves / 26 shots		Goalie stats	Gary Smith 17 saves / 25 shots Joe Daley 2 saves / 2 shots

May 16	Edmonton Oilers	2–3	Winnipeg Jets	Winnipeg Arena	Recap
7:41 – Wayne Gretzky (MacDonald, Callighen)		First period	12:54 – Rich Preston (Sullivan)
13:42 – Brett Callighen (Gretzky, Gustafsson)		Second period	No scoring
No scoring		Third period	9:24 – pp – Morris Lukowich (Nilsson, Lindstrom); 13:34 – Lyle Moffat (Lesuk, Eriksson)
Dave Dryden 24 saves / 27 shots		Goalie stats	Gary Smith 20 saves / 22 shots

May 18	Winnipeg Jets	2–10	Edmonton Oilers	Northlands Coliseum	Recap
No scoring		First period	4:23 – Dennis Sobchuk (Chipperfield, Shmyr); 16:28 – Wayne Gretzky (Callighen, Chipperfield); 17:29 – Stan Weir (Micheletti, Sobchuk); 18:01 – Ron Chipperfield (Dave Langevin)
0:22 - Rich Preston (Lukowich, Nilsson)		Second period	2:58 – Dennis Sobchuk (Shmyr, Weir); 4:51 – Ron Chipperfield (Siltanen, Micheletti); 10:45 – Ron Chipperfield (Driscoll, Semenko); 14:23 - John Hughes (Sobchuk)
3:14 – Kent Nilsson		Third period	7:45 – Ron Chipperfield (Semenko); 14:31 – Ron Chipperfield (Micheletti, Siltanen)
Gary Smith / Joe Daley 32 saves / 42 shots		Goalie stats	Dave Dryden / Eddie Mio 19 saves / 21 shots

May 20	Edmonton Oilers	3–7	Winnipeg Jets	Winnipeg Arena	Recap
No scoring		First period	2:14 – pp – Willy Lindstrom (Ruskowski, Lukowich); 15:42 – Barry Long (Ruskowski, Lukowich)
18:45 – Ron Chipperfield (Driscoll, Siltanen)		Second period	5:22 – pp – Paul MacKinnon (Sullivan, Hicks); 6:35 – Lyle Moffat (Eriksson, Lukowich); 9:23 – Barry Long (Ruskowski, MacKinnon)
1:48 – Bill Flett (Hamilton); 19:48 – pp – Dave Semenko (Chipperfield, Siltanen)		Third period	2:09 – Kent Nilsson (Sullivan); 13:38 – Willy Lindstrom (Ruskowski)
Dave Dryden 13 saves / 18 shots Eddie Mio 14 saves / 16 shots		Goalie stats	Gary Smith 27 saves / 30 shots

Winnipeg won series 4–2

== Player statistics ==
These were the top ten skaters based on points.

Player	Team	GP	G	A	Pts	+/–	PIM
Wayne Gretzky	Edmonton Oilers	13	10	10	20	6	2
Ron Chipperfield	Edmonton Oilers	13	9	10	19	1	8
Blair MacDonald	Edmonton Oilers	13	8	10	18	1	6
Brett Callighen	Edmonton Oilers	13	5	10	15	5	15
Willy Lindstrom	Winnipeg Jets	10	10	5	15	7	9
Morris Lukowich	Winnipeg Jets	10	8	7	15	9	21
Kent Nilsson	Winnipeg Jets	10	3	11	14	-1	4
Peter Sullivan	Winnipeg Jets	10	5	9	14	2	2
Rich Preston	Winnipeg Jets	10	8	5	13	3	15
Terry Ruskowski	Winnipeg Jets	8	1	12	13	10	23

== Championship roster ==
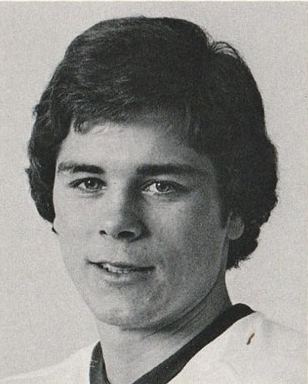
Rich Preston of Winnipeg won the fifth and final WHA Playoff MVP awarded by the league

1978–79 Winnipeg Jets

=== Players ===
Centres

- Roland Eriksson
- Steve West
- Terry Ruskowski
- Peter Sullivan
- Kent Nilsson
- Rich Gosselin (did not play)

Wingers

- Glenn Hicks
- Bob Guindon
- Lyle Moffat
- Bill Lesuk
- Morris Lukowich
- John Gray
- Rich Preston
- Willy Lindstrom

Defencemen

- Scott Campbell
- Paul Terbenche
- Lars-Erik Sjoberg (Captain)
- Kim Clackson
- Barry Long
- Paul MacKinnon
- Mike Amodeo (did not play in playoffs)

Goaltenders

- Gary Smith
- Joe Daley
- Markus Mattsson (did not play in playoffs)

=== Coaching and administrative staff ===
- Tom McVie
- Al Sankow
- Dave Mann
- Jack Neaman
