= 1979 NHL expansion draft =

Player selection draft

General information
- Date: June 13, 1979

Overview
- League: National Hockey League
- Expansion teams: Edmonton Oilers; Hartford Whalers; Quebec Nordiques; Winnipeg Jets
- Expansion season: 1979–80

The 1979 NHL expansion draft was held on June 13, 1979. The draft took place to fill the rosters of the National Hockey League's new teams for the 1979–80 season: the Edmonton Oilers, Hartford Whalers, Quebec Nordiques and Winnipeg Jets. These four teams had joined the NHL after a merger agreement was reached with the World Hockey Association (WHA).

As many WHA players also had their rights held by NHL teams, those NHL teams were allowed to reclaim their players. In order to keep the NHL teams from plundering all the talent from the WHA-turned-NHL teams, each incoming franchise was allowed to protect up to two goaltenders and two skaters. These were designated as "priority selections" in the Expansion Draft.

== WHA Dispersal Draft ==
Following the 1978–79 WHA season, and prior to the NHL reclaiming players, the WHA dispersed players on June 9, 1979, whose rights were held by teams not accepted into the NHL: the Birmingham Bulls and Cincinnati Stingers, and the Indianapolis Racers, who had folded during the previous season. Players that were twenty years old or younger were available to all 21 NHL teams in the entry draft, and the remaining players were made available to the four merging teams from the WHA. Before their final season the WHA opted not to have an amateur draft and instead encouraged their teams to sign underage players. Seven Birmingham Bulls were drafted in the 1979 NHL entry draft: Rob Ramage (1st), Rick Vaive (5th), Craig Hartsburg (6th), Michel Goulet (20th), Gaston Gingras (27th), Pat Riggin (33rd), and Keith Crowder (57th). Crowder began the season as a Bull but returned to the Peterborough Petes after just five games. The Cincinnati Stingers used two who were drafted: Mike Gartner (4th) and Mark Messier (48th). Messier was underage but was eligible for the 1979 draft due to his WHA service time. The Winnipeg Jets used John Gibson (71st), but only on a ten game tryout contract in March 1979 but was returned to the Niagara Falls Flyers before the end of the season.

| Player | Drafted From | Drafted To |
|---|---|---|
| Bryon Baltimore (D) | Cincinnati Stingers | Edmonton Oilers |
| Kelly Davis (D) | Cincinnati Stingers | Edmonton Oilers |
| Dave Forbes (LW) | Cincinnati Stingers | Edmonton Oilers |
| Mike Liut (G) | Cincinnati Stingers | Edmonton Oilers |
| Michel Parizeau (C) | Cincinnati Stingers | Edmonton Oilers |
| Reg Thomas (LW) | Cincinnati Stingers | Edmonton Oilers |
| Bryan Watson (D) | Cincinnati Stingers | Edmonton Oilers |
| Dave Fortier (D) | Indianapolis Racers | Edmonton Oilers |
| Bruce Greig (LW) | Indianapolis Racers | Edmonton Oilers |
| Ernie Wakely (G) | Birmingham Bulls | Edmonton Oilers |
| Steve Alley (LW) | Birmingham Bulls | Hartford Whalers |
| Tony Cassolato (RW) | Birmingham Bulls | Hartford Whalers |
| Paul Henderson (LW) | Birmingham Bulls | Hartford Whalers |
| Bob Stephenson (C) | Birmingham Bulls | Hartford Whalers |
| Byron Shutt (LW) | Cincinnati Stingers | Hartford Whalers |
| Al McLeod (D) | Indianapolis Racers | Hartford Whalers |
| Peter Marrin (C) | Birmingham Bulls | Quebec Nordiques |
| John Stewart (C) | Birmingham Bulls | Quebec Nordiques |
| Greg Tebbutt (D) | Birmingham Bulls | Quebec Nordiques |
| Michel Dion (G) | Cincinnati Stingers | Quebec Nordiques |
| Dave Dornseif (D) | Cincinnati Stingers | Quebec Nordiques |
| Robbie Ftorek (C) | Cincinnati Stingers | Quebec Nordiques |
| Bill Gilligan (C) | Cincinnati Stingers | Quebec Nordiques |
| Barry Melrose (D) | Cincinnati Stingers | Quebec Nordiques |
| Paul Stewart (LW) | Cincinnati Stingers | Quebec Nordiques |
| Jamie Hislop (RW) | Cincinnati Stingers | Winnipeg Jets |
| Barry Legge (D) | Cincinnati Stingers | Winnipeg Jets |
| Peter Marsh (LW) | Cincinnati Stingers | Winnipeg Jets |
| Craig Norwich (D) | Cincinnati Stingers | Winnipeg Jets |

== Expansion draft rules ==
Reclaiming of players: The 17 existing NHL teams were allowed to reclaim any rights to former WHA players they held. The four incoming franchises, however, were allowed to protect up to two goaltenders and two skaters, voiding their NHL rights. These players were considered "priority selections" in the expansion draft. Numerous deals were cut by the incoming teams to retain some of their players. For instance, Quebec retained star forward Real Cloutier by trading a first-round draft choice to the Chicago Black Hawks, which held Cloutier's rights; that pick was used to select perennial superstar Denis Savard.

Wayne Gretzky was a special case - although no team held his NHL rights, under existing rules he would have been removed from the Oilers and placed into the NHL entry draft. However, Gretzky had been signed by Oilers owner Peter Pocklington to a personal services contract instead of a standard player contract. Confronted with the probability of being drafted first overall by the last place Colorado Rockies, Gretzky refused to void his contract with Pocklington. After deliberation, the Oilers were allowed to keep Gretzky as one of their priority selections, and agreed to choose last in each round of the 1979 NHL entry draft as further compensation.

Gordie Howe was a second special case - as a gentlemen's agreement between the Hartford Whalers and the Detroit Red Wings, which held his NHL rights, the Red Wings declined to reclaim the 51-year-old Howe.

Dave Keon was a third special case - Toronto Maple Leafs owner Harold Ballard wanted to reclaim Keon as Ballard held the rights to Keon's contract after Keon left for the Hartford Whalers. NHL President John Ziegler was able to convince Ballard to let Keon stay with the Whalers, teaming up with the aforementioned Gordie Howe.

Expansion draft: Each of the 17 existing NHL teams were allowed to protect 15 skaters and two veteran goalies.

Compensation: The 17 existing NHL teams received $125,000 for each player drafted, these payments being funded by the $6 million in franchise fees each of the former WHA teams paid to join the NHL.

== Reclaimed players ==
These are players whose NHL rights were reclaimed when the WHA merged with the NHL.

| No. | Player | Reclaimed from | Reclaimed by |
|---|---|---|---|
| 1. | Kent Nilsson (LW) | Winnipeg Jets | Atlanta Flames |
| 2. | Bobby Hull (LW) | Winnipeg Jets | Chicago Black Hawks |
| 3. | Terry Ruskowski (RW) | Winnipeg Jets | Chicago Black Hawks |
| 4. | Doug Berry (C) | Edmonton Oilers | Colorado Rockies |
| 5. | Wes George (LW) | Edmonton Oilers | Detroit Red Wings |
| 6. | Glenn Hicks (LW) | Winnipeg Jets | Detroit Red Wings |
| 7. | Barry Long (D) | Winnipeg Jets | Detroit Red Wings |
| 8. | George Lyle (LW) | Hartford Whalers | Detroit Red Wings |
| 9. | Steve Carlson (RW) | Edmonton Oilers | Los Angeles Kings |
| 10. | Cal Sandbeck (D) | Edmonton Oilers | Minnesota North Stars |
| 11. | Dave Semenko (LW) | Edmonton Oilers | Minnesota North Stars |
| 12. | Paul Shmyr (D) | Edmonton Oilers | Minnesota North Stars |
| 13. | Greg Tebbutt (D) | Quebec Nordiques | Minnesota North Stars |
| 14. | Alain Cote (LW) | Quebec Nordiques | Montreal Canadiens |
| 15. | Dan Geoffrion (RW) | Quebec Nordiques | Montreal Canadiens |
| 16. | Alan Hangsleben (D) | Hartford Whalers | Montreal Canadiens |
| 17. | Peter Marsh (RW) | Winnipeg Jets | Montreal Canadiens |
| 18. | Kelly Davis (D) | Edmonton Oilers | New York Islanders |
| 19. | Dave Langevin (D) | Edmonton Oilers | New York Islanders |
| 20. | Warren Miller (RW) | Hartford Whalers | New York Rangers |
| 21. | Jim Mayer (C) | Edmonton Oilers | New York Rangers |
| 22. | Dennis Sobchuk (LW) | Edmonton Oilers | Philadelphia Flyers |
| 23. | Kim Clackson (D) | Winnipeg Jets | Pittsburgh Penguins |
| 24. | Mike Liut (G) | Edmonton Oilers | St. Louis Blues |
| 25. | Christian Bordeleau (C) | Quebec Nordiques | St. Louis Blues |
| 26. | Risto Siltanen (D) | Edmonton Oilers | St. Louis Blues |
| 27. | Rick Ley (D) | Hartford Whalers | Toronto Maple Leafs |
| 28. | Stan Weir (D) | Edmonton Oilers | Toronto Maple Leafs |
| 29. | John Hughes (D) | Edmonton Oilers | Vancouver Canucks |
| 30. | Paul MacKinnon (D) | Winnipeg Jets | Washington Capitals |

- Twelve additional players were reclaimed, but were chosen as 'Priority Selections' by the four merging franchises

== Expansion draft results ==
=== Priority selections ===
These players were "priority selections" in the 1979 NHL expansion draft.

| No. | Player | Rights Denied | Rights Kept |
|---|---|---|---|
| 1. | Dave Dryden (G) | Buffalo Sabres | Edmonton Oilers |
| 2. | Wayne Gretzky (C) | 1979 NHL entry draft | Edmonton Oilers |
| 3. | Eddie Mio (G) | Minnesota North Stars | Edmonton Oilers |
| 4. | Bengt-Ake Gustafsson^{1} (RW) | Edmonton Oilers | Washington Capitals |
| 5. | Jordy Douglas (F) | Toronto Maple Leafs | Hartford Whalers |
| 6. | John Garrett (G) | St. Louis Blues | Hartford Whalers |
| 7. | Mark Howe (D) | Boston Bruins | Hartford Whalers |
| 8. | Paul Baxter (D) | Pittsburgh Penguins | Quebec Nordiques |
| 9. | Richard Brodeur (G) | New York Islanders | Quebec Nordiques |
| 10. | Garry Lariviere (D) | Buffalo Sabres | Quebec Nordiques |
| 11. | Scott Campbell (D) | St. Louis Blues | Winnipeg Jets |
| 12. | Morris Lukowich (LW) | Pittsburgh Penguins | Winnipeg Jets |
| 13. | Markus Mattsson (G) | New York Islanders | Winnipeg Jets |

^{1} The NHL denied the Oilers' claim of Bengt-Ake Gustafsson. League president John Ziegler ruled that the Oilers violated WHA rules when they attempted to add Gustafsson to their team during the 1979 playoffs, so they voided any claim on him.

The following are the players selected in the 1979 NHL expansion draft:

=== Hartford Whalers selections ===
| Overall # | Player | Drafted from |
|---|---|---|
| 1. | Alan Hangsleben (D) | Montreal Canadiens |
| 5. | Nick Fotiu (LW) | New York Rangers |
| 9. | Rick Ley (D) | Toronto Maple Leafs |
| 13. | Al Sims (D) | Boston Bruins |
| 17. | Jean Savard (C) | Chicago Black Hawks |
| 21. | Ralph Klassen (F) | Colorado Rockies |
| 25. | Rick Hodgson (D) | Atlanta Flames |
| 29. | Kevin Kemp (D) | Toronto Maple Leafs |
| 33. | Bill Bennett (LW) | Boston Bruins |
| 37. | Bernie Johnston (C/LW) | Philadelphia Flyers |
| 41. | Brian Hill (RW) | Atlanta Flames |
| 45. | Dave Given (F) | Buffalo Sabres |
| 49. | M. F. Schurman (LW) | Philadelphia Flyers |
| 53. | Nick Beverley (D) | Colorado Rockies |
| 57. | Norm Lapointe (G) | Vancouver Canucks |
| 61. | Don Kozak (LW) | Vancouver Canucks |

=== Winnipeg Jets selections ===
| Overall # | Player | Drafted from |
|---|---|---|
| 2. | Peter Marsh (LW) | Montreal Canadiens |
| 6. | Lindsay Middlebrook (G) | New York Rangers |
| 10. | Bobby Hull (LW) | Chicago Black Hawks |
| 14. | Al Cameron (D) | Detroit Red Wings |
| 18. | Dave Hoyda (LW) | Philadelphia Flyers |
| 22. | Jim Roberts (LW) | Minnesota North Stars |
| 26. | Lorne Stamler (LW) | Toronto Maple Leafs |
| 30. | Mark Heaslip (RW) | Los Angeles Kings |
| 34. | Pierre Hamel (G) | Toronto Maple Leafs |
| 38. | Gord McTavish (F) | St. Louis Blues |
| 42. | Gord Smith (D) | Washington Capitals |
| 46. | Clark Hamilton (C) | Detroit Red Wings |
| 50. | Jim Cunningham (LW) | Philadelphia Flyers |
| 54. | Dennis Abgrall (RW) | Los Angeles Kings |
| 60. | Bill Riley (W) | Washington Capitals |
| 62. | Gene Carr (C) | Atlanta Flames |
| 66. | Hilliard Graves (RW) | Vancouver Canucks |

=== Quebec Nordiques selections ===
| Overall # | Player | Drafted from |
|---|---|---|
| 3. | Dave Farrish (D) | New York Rangers |
| 7. | Gerry Hart (D) | New York Islanders |
| 11. | Ron Low (G) | Detroit Red Wings |
| 15. | Pierre Plante (RW) | New York Rangers |
| 19. | Blair Stewart (F) | Washington Capitals |
| 23. | John Baby (D) | Minnesota North Stars |
| 27. | John Smrke (LW) | St. Louis Blues |
| 31. | Dave Parro (G) | Boston Bruins |
| 35. | Ken Kuzyk (RW) | Minnesota North Stars |
| 39. | Roland Cloutier (C) | Detroit Red Wings |
| 43. | Terry Martin (F) | Buffalo Sabres |
| 47. | Jamie Masters (D) | St. Louis Blues |
| 51. | Hartland Monahan (F) | Los Angeles Kings |
| 55. | Ron Andruff (C) | Colorado Rockies |
| 59. | Alain Cote (LW) | Montreal Canadiens |
| 63. | Lars Zetterstrom (D) | Vancouver Canucks |

=== Edmonton Oilers selections ===
| Overall # | Player | Drafted from |
|---|---|---|
| 4. | Cam Connor (RW) | Montreal Canadiens |
| 8. | Lee Fogolin (D) | Buffalo Sabres |
| 12. | Pat Price (D) | New York Islanders |
| 16. | Colin Campbell (D) | Pittsburgh Penguins |
| 20. | Larry Brown (D) | Los Angeles Kings |
| 24. | Pete LoPresti (G) | Minnesota North Stars |
| 28. | Ron Areshenkoff (C) | Buffalo Sabres |
| 32. | Inge Hammarstrom (D) | St. Louis Blues |
| 36. | John Gould (RW) | Atlanta Flames |
| 40. | Doug Hicks (D) | Chicago Black Hawks |
| 44. | Tom Edur (D) | Pittsburgh Penguins |
| 48. | Wayne Bianchin (LW) | Pittsburgh Penguins |
| 52. | Mike Forbes (D) | Boston Bruins |
| 56. | Doug Favell (G) | Colorado Rockies |
| 60. | Doug Patey (RW) | Washington Capitals |
| 64. | J. Bob Kelly (LW) | Chicago Black Hawks |

- Both Reg Thomas and Dave Hunter are described as being taken in this draft, however in Greig's detailed lists they are both part of the "pre–draft Roster."
- Dave Hunter was not claimed in the dispersal draft by the team drafted him, the Montreal Canadiens.
- Reg Thomas was not claimed in the dispersal draft by the team that drafted him, the Chicago Black Hawks.

== See also ==
- 1978–79 WHA season
- 1979 NHL entry draft
- 1979–80 NHL season
