= List of Quebec Nordiques seasons =

This is a list of the seasons of the Quebec Nordiques team, which competed in the World Hockey Association (WHA) from 1972 to 1979 and National Hockey League (NHL) from 1979 to 1995. The Nordiques relocated to Colorado after the 1994–95 NHL season to become the Colorado Avalanche.

== Table key ==
Key of colors and symbols
Color/symbol	Explanation
†	Avco Cup champions
↑	Division champions

Key of terms and abbreviations
Term or abbreviation	Definition
Finish	Final position in division or league standings
GP	Number of games played
W	Number of wins
L	Number of losses
T	Number of ties
Pts	Number of points
GF	Goals for (goals scored by the Nordiques)
GA	Goals against (goals scored by the Nordiques' opponents)
—	Does not apply

== Season-by-season record ==
=== WHA era ===
Season	Team season	Division	Regular season (Note: Code explanation; GP – games played, W – wins, L – losses, T – ties, GF – goals for, GA – goals against, Pts – points)								Postseason (Note: The result of the playoff series shows the Nordiques' result first regardless of the outcome, followed by the opposing team in parentheses.)					
Season	Team season	Division	Finish	GP	W	L	T	Pts	GF	GA	GP	W	L	GF	GA	Result
1972–73	1972–73	Eastern	5th	78	33	40	5	71	276	313	Did not qualify					
1973–74	1973–74	Eastern	5th	78	38	36	4	80	306	280	Did not qualify					
1974–75	1974–75	Canadian ↑	1st	78	46	32	0	92	331	299	15	8	7	55	48	Won in quarterfinals, 4–1 (Roadrunners); Won in semifinals, 4–2 (Fighting Saints); Lost in Avco Cup Finals, 0–4 (Aeros)
1975–76	1975–76	Canadian	2nd	81	50	27	4	104	371	316	5	1	4	15	23	Lost in quarterfinals, 1–4 (Cowboys)
1976–77	1976–77	Eastern ↑	1st	81	47	31	3	97	353	295	17	12	5	79	56	Won in quarterfinals, 4–1 (Whalers); Won in semifinals, 4–1 (Racers); Won in Avco Cup Final, 4–3 (Jets) †
1977–78	1977–78	—	4th	80	40	37	3	83	349	347	11	5	6	43	41	Won in quarterfinals, 4–2 (Aeros); Lost in semifinals, 1–4 (Whalers)
1978–79	1978–79	—	2nd	80	41	34	5	87	288	271	5	1	4	12	30	Lost in semifinals, 1–4 (Jets)
WHA totals (Note: Totals as of the completion of the 1978–79 WHA season)				556	295	237	24	614	2,274	2,121	53	27	26	204	198	5 playoff appearances

=== NHL era ===
Season	Team season	Conference	Division	Regular season (Note: Code explanation; GP – games played, W – wins, L – losses, T – Ties, GF – goals For, GA – goals against, Pts – points)								Postseason (Note: The result of the playoff series shows the Nordiques' result first regardless of the outcome, followed by the opposing team in parentheses.)					
Season	Team season	Conference	Division	Finish	GP	W	L	T	Pts	GF	GA	GP	W	L	GF	GA	Result
1979–80	1979–80	Wales	Adams	5th	80	25	44	11	61	248	313	Did not qualify					
1980–81	1980–81	Wales	Adams	4th	80	30	32	18	78	314	318	5	2	3	17	12	Lost in preliminary round, 2–3 (Flyers)
1981–82	1981–82	Wales	Adams	4th	80	33	31	16	82	356	345	16	7	9	48	60	Won in division semifinals, 3–2 (Canadiens); Won in division finals, 4–3 (Bruins); Lost in conference finals, 0–4 (Islanders)
1982–83	1982–83	Wales	Adams	4th	80	34	34	12	80	343	336	4	1	3	8	11	Lost in division semifinals, 1–3 (Bruins)
1983–84	1983–84	Wales	Adams	3rd	80	42	28	10	94	360	278	9	5	4	26	25	Won in division semifinals, 3–0 (Sabres); Lost in division finals, 2–4 (Canadiens)
1984–85	1984–85	Wales	Adams	2nd	80	41	30	9	91	323	275	18	9	9	58	62	Won in division semifinals, 3–2 (Sabres); Won in division finals, 4–3 (Canadiens); Lost in conference finals, 2–4 (Flyers)
1985–86	1985–86	Wales	Adams ↑	1st	80	43	31	6	92	330	289	3	0	3	7	16	Lost in division semifinals, 0–3 (Whalers)
1986–87	1986–87	Wales	Adams	4th	80	31	39	10	72	267	276	13	7	6	50	43	Won in division semifinals, 4–2 (Whalers); Lost in division finals, 3–4 (Canadiens)
1987–88	1987–88	Wales	Adams	5th	80	32	43	5	69	271	306	Did not qualify					
1988–89	1988–89	Wales	Adams	5th	80	27	46	7	61	269	342	Did not qualify					
1989–90	1989–90	Wales	Adams	5th	80	12	61	7	31	240	407	Did not qualify					
1990–91	1990–91	Wales	Adams	5th	80	16	50	14	46	236	354	Did not qualify					
1991–92	1991–92	Wales	Adams	5th	80	20	48	12	52	255	318	Did not qualify					
1992–93	1992–93	Wales	Adams	2nd	84	47	27	10	104	351	300	6	2	4	16	19	Lost in division semifinals, 2–4 (Canadiens)
1993–94	1993–94	Eastern	Northeast	5th	84	34	42	8	76	277	292	Did not qualify					
1994–95 (Note: Season was shortened due to the 1994–95 NHL lockout.)	1994–95	Eastern	Northeast ↑	1st	48	30	13	5	65	185	134	6	2	4	19	25	Lost in conference quarterfinals, 2–4 (Rangers)
Relocated to Colorado
NHL totals (Note: Totals as of the completion of the 1994–95 season)					1,256	497	599	160	1,154	4,625	4,883	80	35	45	249	283	9 playoff appearances
