= List of Colorado Avalanche seasons =

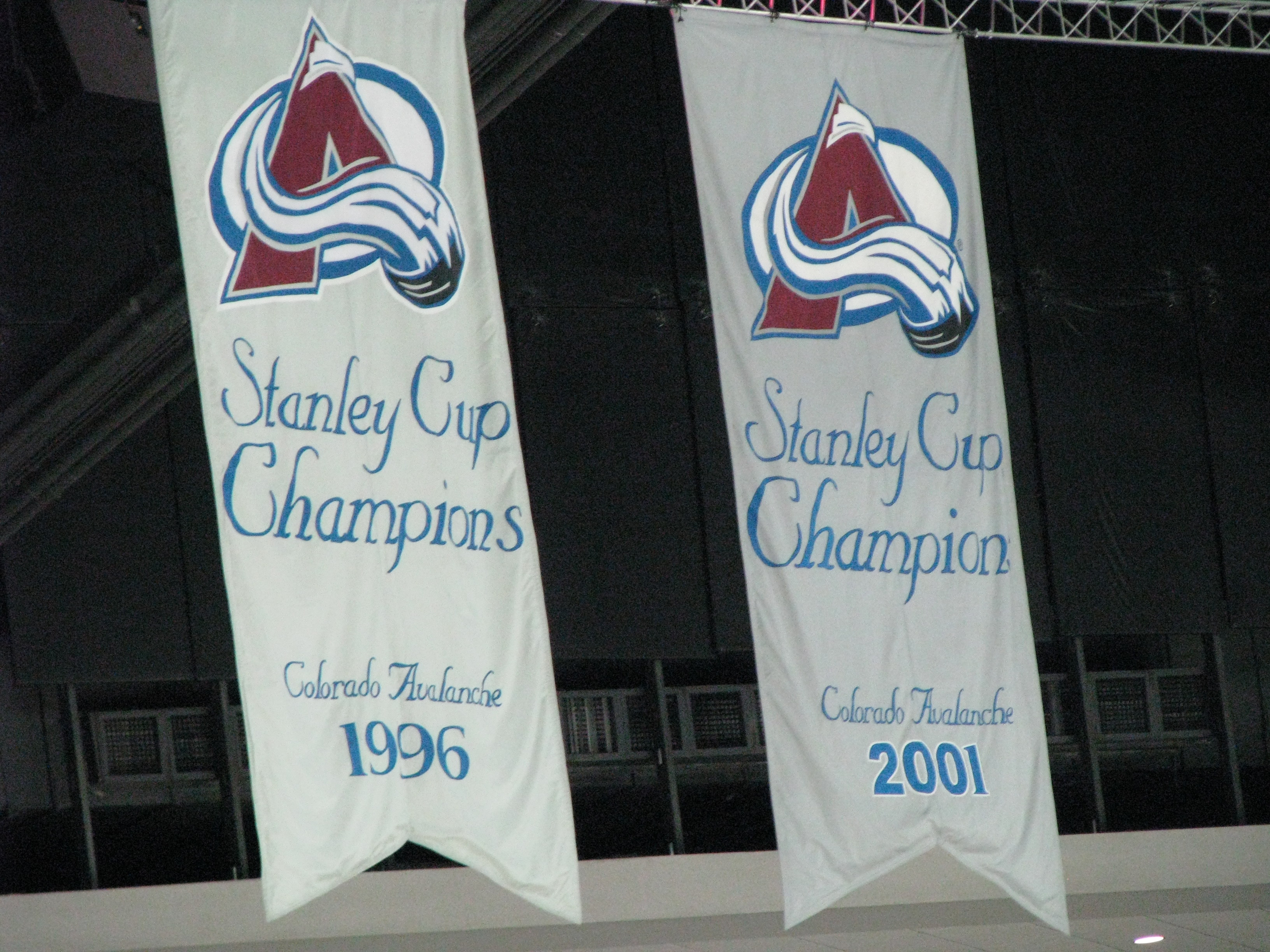
Banners commemorating the Avalanche's first two Stanley Cup championships in 1996 and 2001.

The Colorado Avalanche are a professional ice hockey team based in Denver. The team is a member of the Central Division of the Western Conference of the National Hockey League (NHL). The team started as Quebec Nordiques in the World Hockey Association (WHA) and played in the league until its merger with the NHL in 1979. The Nordiques later relocated from Quebec to become the Colorado Avalanche before the 1995–96 season. The Avalanche have reached three Stanley Cup Finals, winning all of them (1996, 2001, 2022). After winning the 1996 Stanley Cup, Colorado became the first NHL team and the second team in North American professional sports history to win a championship in the same season they moved to a new city.

== Table key ==
Key of colors and symbols
Color/symbol	Explanation
†	Stanley Cup champions
‡	Conference champions
↑	Division champions
#	Led league in points

Key of terms and abbreviations
Term or abbreviation	Definition
Finish	Final position in division or league standings
GP	Number of games played
W	Number of wins
L	Number of losses
T	Number of ties
OT	Number of losses in overtime (since the 1999–2000 season)
Pts	Number of points
GF	Goals for (goals scored by the Avalanche)
GA	Goals against (goals scored by the Avalanche' opponents)
—	Does not apply

== Year by year ==
Season	Avalanche season	Conference	Division	Regular season									Postseason						
Season	Avalanche season	Conference	Division	Finish	GP	W	L	T	OT	Pts	GF	GA	GP	W	L	OT	GF	GA	Result
Relocated from Quebec
1995–96	1995–96	Western‡	Pacific↑	1st	82	47	25	10	—	104	326	240	22	16	6	—	80	51	Won in conference quarterfinals, 4–2 (Canucks); Won in conference semifinals, 4–2 (Blackhawks); Won in conference finals, 4–2 (Red Wings); Won in Stanley Cup Final, 4–0 (Panthers)†
1996–97	1996–97	Western	Pacific↑	1st	82	49	24	9	—	107#	277	205	17	10	7	—	59	41	Won in conference quarterfinals, 4–2 (Blackhawks); Won in conference semifinals, 4–1 (Oilers); Lost in conference finals, 2–4 (Red Wings)
1997–98	1997–98	Western	Pacific↑	1st	82	39	26	17	—	95	231	205	7	3	4	—	16	19	Lost in conference quarterfinals, 3–4 (Oilers)
1998–99	1998–99	Western	Northwest↑	1st	82	44	28	10	—	98	239	205	19	11	8	—	56	54	Won in conference quarterfinals, 4–2 (Sharks); Won in conference semifinals, 4–2 (Red Wings); Lost in conference finals, 3–4 (Stars)
1999–00	1999–00	Western	Northwest↑	1st	82	42	28	11	1	96	233	201	17	11	6	—	43	32	Won in conference quarterfinals, 4–1 (Coyotes); Won in conference semifinals, 4–1 (Red Wings); Lost in conference finals, 3–4 (Stars)
2000–01	2000–01	Western‡	Northwest↑	1st	82	52	16	10	4	118#	270	192	23	16	7	—	69	41	Won in conference quarterfinals, 4–0 (Canucks); Won in conference semifinals, 4–3 (Kings); Won in conference finals, 4–1 (Blues); Won in Stanley Cup Final, 4–3 (Devils)†
2001–02	2001–02	Western	Northwest↑	1st	82	45	28	8	1	99	212	169	21	11	10	—	54	56	Won in conference quarterfinals, 4–3 (Kings); Won in conference semifinals, 4–3 (Sharks); Lost in conference finals, 3–4 (Red Wings)
2002–03	2002–03	Western	Northwest↑	1st	82	42	19	13	8	105	251	194	7	3	4	—	17	16	Lost conference quarterfinals, 3–4 (Wild)
2003–04	2003–04	Western	Northwest	2nd	82	40	22	13	7	100	236	198	11	6	5	—	26	24	Won in conference quarterfinals, 4–1 (Stars); Lost in conference semifinals, 2–4 (Sharks)
2004–05^{1}	2004–05	Season canceled due to 2004–05 NHL lockout																	
2005–06^{2}	2005–06	Western	Northwest	2nd	82	43	30	—	9	95	280	251	9	4	5	—	22	31	Won in conference quarterfinals, 4–1 (Stars); Lost in conference semifinals, 0–4 (Mighty Ducks)
2006–07	2006–07	Western	Northwest	4th	82	44	31	—	7	95	267	247	—	—	—	—	—	—	Did not qualify
2007–08	2007–08	Western	Northwest	2nd	82	44	31	—	7	95	224	216	10	4	6	—	26	33	Won in conference quarterfinals, 4–2 (Wild); Lost in conference semifinals, 0–4 (Red Wings)
2008–09	2008–09	Western	Northwest	5th	82	32	45	—	5	69	190	253	—	—	—	—	—	—	Did not qualify
2009–10	2009–10	Western	Northwest	2nd	82	43	30	—	9	95	237	228	6	2	4	—	11	19	Lost in conference quarterfinals, 2–4 (Sharks)
2010–11	2010–11	Western	Northwest	4th	82	30	44	—	8	68	221	287	—	—	—	—	—	—	Did not qualify
2011–12	2011–12	Western	Northwest	3rd	82	41	35	—	6	88	199	218	—	—	—	—	—	—	Did not qualify
2012–13^{3}	2012–13	Western	Northwest	5th	48	16	25	—	7	39	114	150	—	—	—	—	—	—	Did not qualify
2013–14	2013–14	Western	Central↑	1st	82	52	22	—	8	112	245	216	7	3	4	—	20	22	Lost in first round, 3–4 (Wild)
2014–15	2014–15	Western	Central	7th	82	39	31	—	12	90	209	223	—	—	—	—	—	—	Did not qualify
2015–16	2015–16	Western	Central	6th	82	39	39	—	4	82	212	240	—	—	—	—	—	—	Did not qualify
2016–17	2016–17	Western	Central	7th	82	22	56	—	4	48	165	276	—	—	—	—	—	—	Did not qualify
2017–18	2017–18	Western	Central	4th	82	43	30	—	9	95	255	236	6	2	4	—	15	22	Lost in first round, 2–4 (Predators)
2018–19	2018–19	Western	Central	5th	82	38	30	—	14	90	258	244	12	7	5	—	35	31	Won in first round, 4–1 (Flames); Lost in second round, 3–4 (Sharks)
2019–20^{4}	2019–20	Western	Central	2nd	70	42	20	—	8	92	236	190	15	9	5	1	60	41	Finished second in seeding round-robin (2–0–1); Won in first round, 4–1 (Coyotes); Lost in second round, 3–4 (Stars)
2020–21^{5}	2020–21	—	West↑	1st	56	39	13	—	4	82#	197	132	10	6	4	—	38	27	Won in first round, 4–0 (Blues); Lost in second round, 2–4 (Golden Knights)
2021–22	2021–22	Western‡	Central↑	1st	82	56	19	—	7	119	308	232	20	16	4	—	85	55	Won in first round, 4–0 (Predators); Won in second round, 4–2 (Blues); Won in conference finals, 4–0 (Oilers); Won in Stanley Cup Final, 4–2 (Lightning)†
2022–23	2022–23	Western	Central↑	1st	82	51	24	—	7	109	274	223	7	3	4	—	19	18	Lost in first round, 3–4 (Kraken)
2023–24	2023–24	Western	Central	3rd	82	50	25	—	7	107	302	252	11	6	5	—	43	37	Won in first round, 4–1 (Jets); Lost in second round, 2–4 (Stars)
2024–25	2024–25	Western	Central	3rd	82	49	29	—	4	102	273	231	7	3	4	—	24	21	Lost in first round, 3–4 (Stars)
2025–26	2025–26	Western	Central↑	1st	82	55	16	—	11	121#	298	197	13	8	5	—	44	37	Won in first round, 4–0 (Kings); Won in second round, 4–1 (Wild); Lost in conference finals, 0–4 (Golden Knights)
Totals					2,388	1,268	841	101	178	2,815	7,239	6,551	277	160	116	1	862	728	22 playoff appearances

^{1} Season was canceled due to the 2004–05 NHL lockout.
^{2} As of the 2005–06 NHL season, all games tied after regulation will be decided in a shootout; SOL (Shootout losses) will be recorded as OTL in the standings.
^{3} The 2012–13 NHL season was shortened due to the 2012–13 NHL lockout.
^{4} The 2019–20 NHL season was suspended on March 12, 2020 due to the COVID-19 pandemic.
^{5} Due to the COVID-19 pandemic, the 2020–21 NHL season was shortened to 56 games.

=== All-time records ===
Statistic	GP	W	L	T	OT
Regular season record (1995–present)	2,388	1,268	841	101	178
Postseason record (1995–present)	277	160	116	—	1
All-time regular and postseason record	2,665	1,428	957	101	179
All-time series record: 29–19
