= Brett Callighen =

Canadian ice hockey player (born 1953)

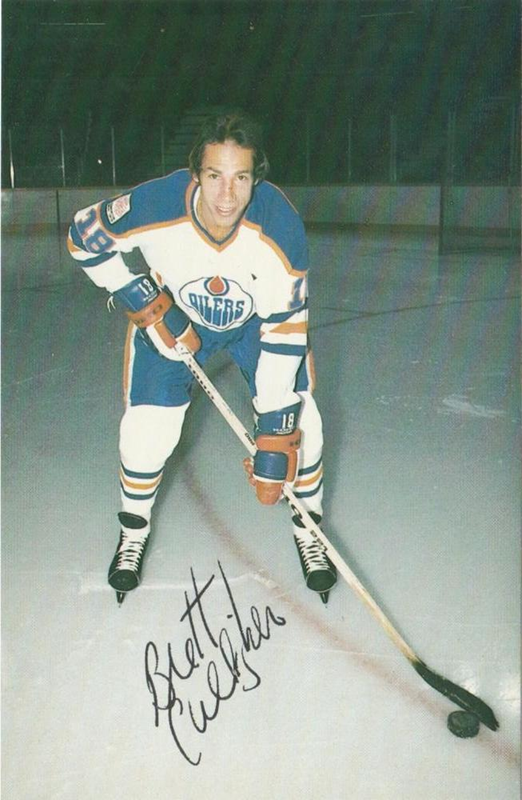
- Born: May 15, 1953 (age 72) Toronto, Ontario, Canada
- Height: 5 ft 11 in (180 cm)
- Weight: 182 lb (83 kg; 13 st 0 lb)
- Position: Centre
- Shot: Left
- Played for: WHA; New England Whalers; WHA/NHL; Edmonton Oilers; NLA; HC Lugano; AEL; Wiener EV
- NHL draft: Undrafted
- Playing career: 1974–1986

Brett Charles Callighen (born May 15, 1953) is a Canadian retired professional ice hockey forward who played 213 games in the World Hockey Association (WHA), followed by 160 games in the National Hockey League (NHL). He played for the New England Whalers and Edmonton Oilers. He was Wayne Gretzky's first regular left winger.

== Playing career ==
Callighen was playing with the Oilers when they were one of the four WHA teams to move into the NHL for the 1979–80 NHL season. On October 14, 1979, Callighen along with Blair MacDonald assisted on Gretzky's first NHL goal. During that season, on 24 February, Callighen suffered an injury to his left eye when it was clipped by Brad McCrimmon's stick, causing Callighen to miss the remainder of that season. Callighen had repeated surgeries, but was declared legally blind in that eye. He played in only portions of the Oilers' 1980–81 and 1981–82 seasons, followed by a few games over the next four years with top-tier European teams HC Lugano and Vienna EV and AHL team Adirondack Red Wings.

== Hockey agent ==
Upon retiring from hockey, Callighen began working as a hockey agent, co-running Optima World Sports with former Oilers teammate Ron Chipperfield, sending players to Europe and Asia, including Switzerland, Germany, Austria, Sweden and Republic of Korea.

His clientele over the years have included Curtis Brown, Mark Hartigan, Todd Warriner, Jon Sim, Matt Higgins, Brad Fast and Jeff Toms among others.

== Career statistics ==
			Regular season					Playoffs
Season	Team	League	GP	G	A	Pts	PIM	GP	G	A	Pts	PIM
1974–75	Dallas Black Hawks	CHL	5	0	1	1	2	—	—	—	—	—
1974–75	Flint Generals	IHL	50	6	20	26	80	—	—	—	—	—
1974–75	Kalamazoo Wings	IHL	21	3	11	14	40	—	—	—	—	—
1975–76	Kalamazoo Wings	IHL	72	25	33	58	104	6	2	2	4	21
1976–77	Rhode Island Reds	AHL	22	4	8	12	32	—	—	—	—	—
1976–77	New England Whalers	WHA	33	6	10	16	41	—	—	—	—	—
1976–77	Edmonton Oilers	WHA	29	9	16	25	48	5	4	1	5	7
1977–78	Edmonton Oilers	WHA	80	20	30	50	112	5	0	2	2	16
1978–79	Edmonton Oilers	WHA	71	31	39	70	79	13	5	10	15	15
1979–80	Edmonton Oilers	NHL	59	23	35	58	72	3	0	2	2	0
1980–81	Edmonton Oilers	NHL	55	25	35	60	32	9	4	4	8	6
1981–82	Edmonton Oilers	NHL	46	8	19	27	28	2	0	0	0	2
1982–83	HC Lugano	NLA	16	10	—	—	—	—	—	—	—	—
1983–84	HC Lugano	NLA	13	6	9	15	—	—	—	—	—	—
1983–84	Vienna EV	AEL	23	26	13	39	38	—	—	—	—	—
1985–86	Adirondack Red Wings	AHL	11	0	2	2	6	—	—	—	—	—
WHA totals			213	66	95	161	280	23	9	13	22	38
NHL totals			160	56	89	145	132	14	4	6	10	8
