= Kelly Davis =

Canadian ice hockey player

- Born: September 23, 1958 (age 67) Grande Prairie, Alberta, Canada
- Height: 6 ft 2 in (188 cm)
- Weight: 200 lb (91 kg; 14 st 4 lb)
- Position: Defence
- Shot: Left
- Played for: Cincinnati Stingers
- NHL draft: 101st overall, 1978; New York Islanders
- Playing career: 1978–1983

Kelly Davis (born September 23, 1958) is a Canadian former professional ice hockey player who played in the World Hockey Association (WHA). Davis played 18 games with the Cincinnati Stingers during the 1978–79 WHA season. He was drafted in the sixth round of the 1978 NHL Amateur Draft by the New York Islanders.

== Career statistics ==
=== Regular season and playoffs ===
			Regular season					Playoffs
Season	Team	League	GP	G	A	Pts	PIM	GP	G	A	Pts	PIM
1974–75	Prince Albert Raiders	SJHL	Statistics Unavailable
1975–76	Flin Flon Bombers	WCHL	72	9	33	42	113	––	––	––	––	––
1976–77	Flin Flon Bombers	WCHL	72	5	44	49	150	––	––	––	––	––
1977–78	Flin Flon Bombers	WCHL	67	22	61	83	210	17	3	15	18	57
1978–79	Humboldt Broncos	SJHL	Statistics Unavailable
1978–79	Springfield Indians	AHL	9	0	2	2	10	––	––	––	––	––
1978–79	Philadelphia Firebirds	AHL	37	1	3	4	65	––	––	––	––	––
1978–79	Cincinnati Stingers	WHA	18	0	1	1	20	––	––	––	––	––
1979–80	Indianapolis Checkers	CHL	79	6	16	22	82	7	2	0	2	8
1980–81	Indianapolis Checkers	CHL	57	3	13	16	56	5	1	2	3	4
1981–82	Indianapolis Checkers	CHL	73	2	12	14	100	13	3	1	4	10
1982–83	Indianapolis Checkers	CHL	76	2	21	23	95	12	1	5	6	15
WHA totals			18	0	1	1	20	—	—	—	—	—
