= Blair Barnes =

Canadian ice hockey player

- Born: September 21, 1960 Windsor, Ontario, Canada
- Died: June 29, 2010 (aged 49) Chicago, Illinois, U.S.
- Height: 5 ft 11 in (180 cm)
- Weight: 190 lb (86 kg; 13 st 8 lb)
- Position: Right wing
- Shot: Right
- Played for: Los Angeles Kings
- NHL draft: 126th overall, 1979; Edmonton Oilers
- Playing career: 1980–1984

Blair James Barnes (September 21, 1960 – June 29, 2010) was a Canadian professional ice hockey right winger who played in one National Hockey League game for the Los Angeles Kings during the 1982–83 season. The rest of his career, which lasted from 1980 to 1984, was spent in the minor leagues.

== Playing career and death ==
Barnes played three seasons with the Windsor Spitfires from 1977-1980 scoring 127 goals and 169 assists for 296 points in 198 games. He was selected by the Edmonton Oilers in the sixth round of the 1979 NHL entry draft and then played two seasons (1980–1982) with the Wichita Wind of the Central Hockey League before being traded to the Los Angeles Kings in 1982. Barnes played one season with the Kings AHL affiliate team, the New Haven Nighthawks and he scored 29 goals while recording 34 assists for 63 points in 72 games during the 1982-1983 season before being called up by the Kings, where he played his only National Hockey League game. He finished his hockey career with the AHL's Nova Scotia Voyageurs scoring 31 goals and adding 32 assists for 63 points in 80 games played. On June 29, 2010, he died from a heart attack.

== Career statistics ==
=== Regular season and playoffs ===
			Regular season					Playoffs
Season	Team	League	GP	G	A	Pts	PIM	GP	G	A	Pts	PIM
1976–77	Markham Royals	MetJBHL	46	32	34	66	—	—	—	—	—	—
1977–78	Windsor Spitfires	OMJHL	65	22	26	48	163	6	0	1	1	23
1978–79	Windsor Spitfires	OMJHL	67	42	76	118	195	7	4	5	9	6
1979–80	Windsor Spitfires	OMJHL	66	63	67	130	98	16	17	12	29	26
1980–81	Wichita Wind	CHL	30	10	14	24	49	—	—	—	—	—
1981–82	Wichita Wind	CHL	80	28	34	62	99	5	0	1	1	2
1982–83	Los Angeles Kings	NHL	1	0	0	0	0	—	—	—	—	—
1982–83	New Haven Nighthawks	AHL	72	29	24	53	80	1	0	0	0	0
1983–84	Nova Scotia Voyageurs	AHL	80	32	32	64	91	6	4	2	6	12
AHL totals			152	61	56	117	171	7	4	2	6	12
CHL totals			110	38	48	86	148	5	0	1	1	2
NHL totals			1	0	0	0	0	—	—	—	—	—

== See also ==
- List of players who played only one game in the NHL
