= Mike Kouwenhoven =

Canadian-born Dutch ice hockey player

- Born: February 7, 1959 (age 66); Calgary, Alberta, Canada
- Height: 6 ft 0 in (183 cm)
- Weight: 189 lb (86 kg; 13 st 7 lb)
- Position: Left wing
- Shot: Left
- Played for: Feenstra Flyers
- National team: Netherlands
- NHL draft: Undrafted
- Playing career: 1979–1985

Mike Kouwenhoven (born February 7, 1959) is a Canadian-born Dutch former professional ice hockey player.

Kouwenhoven competed as a member of the Netherlands men's national ice hockey team at the 1981 World Ice Hockey Championships.
