= Jordy Douglas =

Canadian ice hockey player (born 1958)

- Born: January 20, 1958 (age 68) Winnipeg, Manitoba, Canada
- Height: 5 ft 11 in (180 cm)
- Weight: 198 lb (90 kg; 14 st 2 lb)
- Position: Forward
- Shot: Left
- Played for: New England Whalers; Hartford Whalers; Minnesota North Stars; Winnipeg Jets; Ilves
- NHL draft: 81st overall, 1978; Toronto Maple Leafs
- Playing career: 1974–1987

Jordy Paul Douglas (born January 20, 1958) is a Canadian former professional ice hockey left winger who played 268 games in the National Hockey League and 51 games in the World Hockey Association. He played for the Hartford Whalers, Minnesota North Stars, and Winnipeg Jets.

== Career statistics ==
=== Regular season and playoffs ===
			Regular season					Playoffs
Season	Team	League	GP	G	A	Pts	PIM	GP	G	A	Pts	PIM
1974–75	Kern-Hill Nationals	AJBHL	48	26	25	51	77	—	—	—	—	—
1975–76	Flin Flon Bombers	WHL	72	12	22	34	48	—	—	—	—	—
1976–77	Flin Flon Bombers	WHL	59	40	23	63	71	—	—	—	—	—
1977–78	Flin Flon Bombers	WHL	71	60	56	116	131	17	14	22	36	20
1978–79	New England Whalers	WHA	51	6	10	16	15	10	4	0	4	23
1978–79	Springfield Indians	AHL	26	7	9	16	21	—	—	—	—	—
1979–80	Hartford Whalers	NHL	77	33	24	57	39	—	—	—	—	—
1980–81	Hartford Whalers	NHL	55	13	9	22	29	—	—	—	—	—
1981–82	Hartford Whalers	NHL	30	10	7	17	44	—	—	—	—	—
1981–82	Binghamton Whalers	AHL	2	0	0	0	0	—	—	—	—	—
1982–83	Minnesota North Stars	NHL	68	13	14	27	30	5	0	0	0	2
1983–84	Minnesota North Stars	NHL	14	3	4	7	19	—	—	—	—	—
1983–84	Winnipeg Jets	NHL	17	4	2	6	8	1	0	0	0	2
1984–85	Winnipeg Jets	NHL	7	0	2	2	0	—	—	—	—	—
1984–85	Sherbrooke Canadiens	AHL	53	23	21	44	16	—	—	—	—	—
1985–86	Ilves	FIN	36	36	13	49	51	—	—	—	—	—
1986–87	Ilves	FIN	31	7	5	12	42	—	—	—	—	—
WHA totals			51	6	10	16	15	10	4	0	4	23
NHL totals			268	76	62	138	169	6	0	0	0	4

== Awards and achievements ==
- Honoured Member of the Manitoba Hockey Hall of Fame
