= Paul Shmyr =

Canadian ice hockey player (1946–2004)

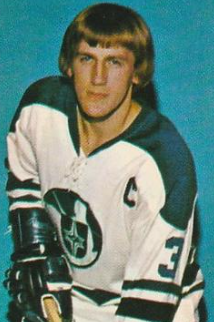
- Shmyr in 1972–73
- Born: January 18, 1946 Cudworth, Saskatchewan, Canada
- Died: September 2, 2004 (aged 58) Surrey, British Columbia, Canada
- Height: 5 ft 11 in (180 cm)
- Weight: 170 lb (77 kg; 12 st 2 lb)
- Position: Defence
- Shot: Left
- Played for: Chicago Blackhawks; California Golden Seals; Cleveland Crusaders; San Diego Mariners; Edmonton Oilers; Minnesota North Stars; Hartford Whalers
- National team: Canada
- Playing career: 1966–1982

Paul Shmyr (January 18, 1946 – September 2, 2004) was a Canadian professional ice hockey defenceman who played in the World Hockey Association (WHA) and National Hockey League (NHL). He featured in the 1971 Stanley Cup Final with the Chicago Black Hawks, the 1979 Avco Cup Final with the Edmonton Oilers, and the 1981 Stanley Cup Final with the Minnesota North Stars.

== Playing career ==
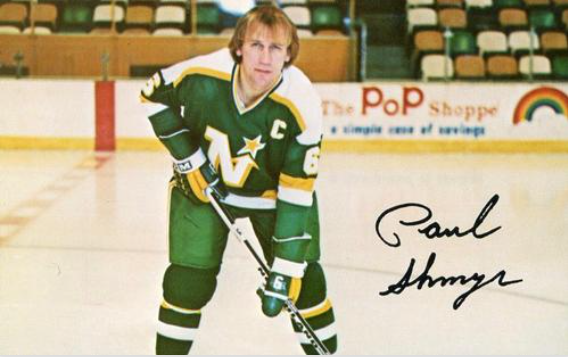
1980 postcard of Shmyr for Minnesota North Stars

Shmyr was one of the top defensive stars in the short history of the WHA, noted for his hard-nosed play, having jumped from the NHL's California Golden Seals to the upstart Cleveland Crusaders. He played four seasons for Cleveland, garnering the league's top defenceman trophy in 1976. He subsequently played for the WHA's San Diego Mariners, where he enjoyed his best offensive campaign, and played two years for the Edmonton Oilers, captaining the club to a regular season league championship in the WHA's final season. As captain, he elected to wear a Cyrillic "К" instead of the customary captain's "C" due to his Ukrainian heritage.

After the WHA folded, the Minnesota North Stars, which owned his rights, reclaimed him, and as a noted leader, was named to captain the North Stars in 1979. While the Stars' captain, he led them to a semifinal appearance in 1980 and to the 1981 Stanley Cup Finals, where they lost to the New York Islanders. He then signed with the Hartford Whalers as a free agent in 1981 and retired after one season.

Shmyr was named to the WHA First Team All-Star Team in 1973, 1974, and 1976, and to its Second Team All-Star Team in 1979; he was one of six players named to the First Team three times in WHA history. He finished third in the WHA's career leaders for games played, twentieth in assists, and fourth in penalty minutes. He represented Canada at the 1974 Summit Series and was one of only two WHAers (the other being Bobby Hull) to be invited to try out for Team Canada at the 1976 Canada Cup, though he failed to make the team.

He was from a hockey-playing family; his younger brother John Shmyr also played in the WHA. Shmyr died of throat cancer in 2004, at the age of 58.

== Honours ==
In 2010, he was elected as an inaugural inductee into the World Hockey Association Hall of Fame.

== Career statistics ==
=== Regular season and playoffs ===
			Regular season					Playoffs
Season	Team	League	GP	G	A	Pts	PIM	GP	G	A	Pts	PIM
1965–66	New Westminster Royals	BCHL	—	—	—	—	—	—	—	—	—	—
1965–66	New Westminster Royals	M-Cup	—	—	—	—	—	4	2	0	2	9
1966–67	New Westminster Royals	BCHL	—	—	—	—	—	—	—	—	—	—
1966–67	Vancouver Canucks	WHL	1	0	0	0	0	—	—	—	—	—
1966–67	Fort Wayne Komets	IHL	70	3	18	21	89	11	3	3	6	19
1967–68	Dallas Black Hawks	CPHL	70	5	15	20	73	5	0	0	0	0
1968–69	Chicago Black Hawks	NHL	3	1	0	1	8	—	—	—	—	—
1968–69	Dallas Black Hawks	CHL	69	7	39	46	118	11	4	12	16	17
1968–69	Portland Buckaroos	WHL	—	—	—	—	—	1	0	1	1	0
1969–70	Chicago Black Hawks	NHL	24	0	4	4	26	8	1	2	3	0
1969–70	Dallas Black Hawks	CHL	48	3	21	24	88	—	—	—	—	—
1970–71	Chicago Black Hawks	NHL	57	1	12	13	41	9	0	0	0	17
1971–72	California Golden Seals	NHL	69	6	21	27	156	—	—	—	—	—
1972–73	Cleveland Crusaders	WHA	73	5	43	48	169	8	1	3	4	19
1973–74	Cleveland Crusaders	WHA	78	13	31	44	165	5	0	4	4	31
1974–75	Cleveland Crusaders	WHA	49	7	14	21	103	5	2	1	3	15
1975–76	Cleveland Crusaders	WHA	70	6	44	50	101	—	—	—	—	—
1976–77	San Diego Mariners	WHA	81	13	37	50	103	7	0	2	2	8
1977–78	Edmonton Oilers	WHA	80	9	40	49	100	5	1	3	4	11
1978–79	Edmonton Oilers	WHA	80	8	39	47	119	13	1	5	6	23
1979–80	Minnesota North Stars	NHL	63	3	15	18	84	14	2	1	3	23
1980–81	Minnesota North Stars	NHL	61	1	9	10	79	3	0	0	0	4
1981–82	Hartford Whalers	NHL	66	1	11	12	134	—	—	—	—	—
WHA totals			511	61	248	309	860	43	5	18	23	107
NHL totals			343	13	72	85	528	34	3	3	6	44

=== International ===
Year	Team	Event	GP	G	A	Pts	PIM
1974	Canada	SS	7	0	2	2	6

Preceded by Glen Sather	Edmonton Oilers captain 1977–79	Succeeded by Ron Chipperfield
Preceded by J. P. Parise	Minnesota North Stars captain 1979–81	Succeeded by Tim Young
