= Blair MacDonald =

Canadian ice hockey player (born 1953)

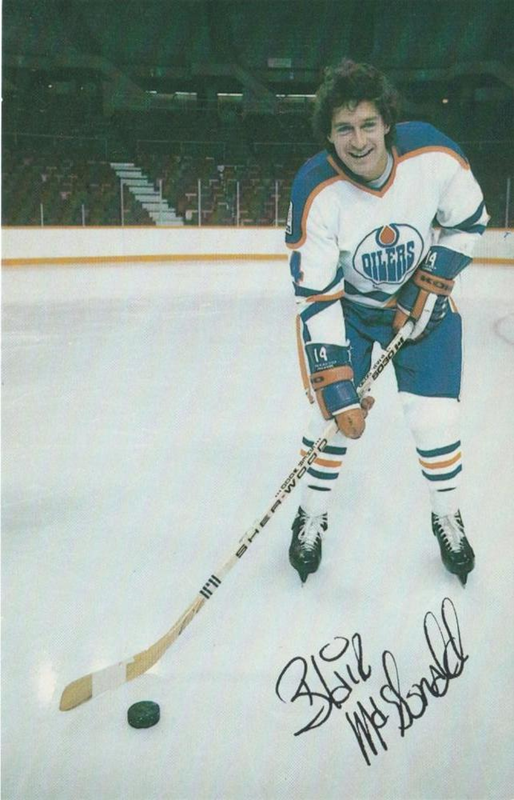
- Born: November 17, 1953 (age 72) Cornwall, Ontario, Canada
- Height: 5 ft 10 in (178 cm)
- Weight: 180 lb (82 kg; 12 st 12 lb)
- Position: Right wing
- Shot: Right
- Played for: Edmonton Oilers; Vancouver Canucks; Indianapolis Racers (WHA)
- NHL draft: 86th overall, 1973; Los Angeles Kings
- WHA draft: 30th overall, 1973; Alberta Oilers
- Playing career: 1973–1983

Blair Neil Joseph "B. J." MacDonald (born November 17, 1953) is a Canadian former professional ice hockey player who played in the National Hockey League and World Hockey Association between 1973 and 1983. He featured in the 1979 WHA Final with the Edmonton Oilers and the 1982 Stanley Cup Finals with the Vancouver Canucks.

He is best known for his time with the Oilers, the club where he spent the majority of his career and where he served as one of Wayne Gretzky's first linemates at the start of Gretzky's NHL career.

== Playing career ==
=== WHA ===
After a stellar final year of junior hockey with the Cornwall Royals of the QMJHL in which he scored 63 goals in 64 games, MacDonald was selected 86th overall by the Los Angeles Kings in the 1973 NHL Amateur Draft. However, he was also selected 30th overall by the Alberta Oilers (renamed the Edmonton Oilers a few months later) of the rival World Hockey Association in their draft and chose to forego the NHL to sign in Edmonton.

MacDonald had a solid rookie professional season in 1973–74, finishing the year with 21 goals and 45 points in 78 games, and posted nearly identical numbers in 1974–75 with 22 goals and 46 points. After a sluggish start to the 1975–76 campaign, he was dealt to the Indianapolis Racers, where he rediscovered his scoring touch and finished the year with a career-high 26 goals. In 1976–77, he blossomed into a top player for the Racers, leading the team with 34 goals and finishing with 64 points. He then added 15 points in nine games in the playoffs.

For 1977–78, MacDonald was traded back to the Oilers, where he enjoyed another fine season with 34 goals and 68 points. Just after the start of the 1978–79 season, Edmonton traded for 17-year-old wunderkind Wayne Gretzky, who dominated the sport for the next two decades. As the Oilers' top right winger and a natural sniper, MacDonald became one of Gretzky's regular wingers, along with Brett Callighen, and finished the year with 34 goals and a career-high 71 points.

=== NHL ===
For the 1979–80 season, Edmonton joined the NHL as part of the WHA merger, and MacDonald would have the finest year of his career. He scored a hat trick on October 19, 1979 to give the Oilers their first victory in the NHL over the Quebec Nordiques. Riding the playmaking wizardry of Gretzky, he would finish the season with 46 goals and 48 assists for 94 points, a total good for 10th in the league. He also played in the 1980 NHL All-Star Game on a line with Gretzky and the Flyers' Bill Barber. With just six penalty minutes all season, he finished fourth in balloting for the Lady Byng Trophy as the league's most gentlemanly player, an award ultimately won by Gretzky. On October 14, 1979, MacDonald along with Callighen both assisted on Gretzky's first NHL goal. When team captain Ron Chipperfield was traded in early 1980, MacDonald was made the NHL Oilers' second-ever captain, and fifth overall in the history of the franchise.

MacDonald continued to produce well in 1980–81, but ultimately lost his place on the Oilers' top line with the development of talented young players like Mark Messier, Glenn Anderson, and especially Finnish star Jari Kurri, who would form the most lethal scoring duo in the league with Gretzky for most of the 1980s. At the trade deadline, MacDonald was dealt to the Vancouver Canucks, where he responded well with 14 points in 12 games to finish the season with 24 goals and 57 points in 63 games between Edmonton and Vancouver.

Despite scoring fairly regularly when in the Canucks' lineup, MacDonald would have a tumultuous tenure in Vancouver where his lack of grit and defensive play failed to endear him to the coaching staff. He scored 18 goals and 33 points in 59 games for the Canucks in 1981–82, but was briefly assigned to the minors for the first time in his career and then barely played in the playoffs as the Canucks reached the Stanley Cup Finals. He would appear in only 17 games for the Canucks in 1982–83, spending most of the season in the minors before being released at the end of the year.

After being released by the Canucks, MacDonald spent three more seasons playing in Austria before retiring in 1986. He finished his career with 91 goals and 100 assists for 191 points in 219 NHL games, and added 171 goals and 165 assists for 336 points in 476 games in the WHA.

Following the conclusion of his playing career, MacDonald accepted a head coaching job in Austria and has spent most of his time coaching in both Europe and North America. In 1988–89, he was named the International Hockey League Coach of the Year after leading the Muskegon Lumberjacks to a 57–18–7 record and the league championship.

In 1994, he was inducted into the Glengarry Sports Hall of Fame.

== Career statistics ==
			Regular season					Playoffs
Season	Team	League	GP	G	A	Pts	PIM	GP	G	A	Pts	PIM
1970–71	Cornwall Royals	QMJHL	51	24	14	38	6	—	—	—	—	—
1971–72	Cornwall Royals	QMJHL	61	45	45	90	36	16	10	5	15	10
1971–72	Cornwall Royals	MC	—	—	—	—	—	3	0	1	1	4
1972–73	Cornwall Royals	QMJHL	64	63	39	102	44	16	14	14	28	10
1973–74	Edmonton Oilers	WHA	78	21	24	45	34	5	4	2	6	2
1974–75	Edmonton Oilers	WHA	72	22	24	46	14	—	—	—	—	—
1975–76	Edmonton Oilers	WHA	29	7	5	12	8	—	—	—	—	—
1975–76	Indianapolis Racers	WHA	56	19	11	30	14	7	0	0	0	0
1976–77	Indianapolis Racers	WHA	81	34	30	64	28	9	7	8	15	4
1977–78	Edmonton Oilers	WHA	80	34	34	68	11	5	1	1	2	0
1978–79	Edmonton Oilers	WHA	80	34	37	71	44	13	8	10	18	6
1979–80	Edmonton Oilers	NHL	80	46	48	94	6	3	0	3	3	0
1980–81	Edmonton Oilers	NHL	51	19	24	43	27	—	—	—	—	—
1980–81	Vancouver Canucks	NHL	12	5	9	14	10	3	0	1	1	2
1981–82	Dallas Black Hawks	CHL	3	1	1	2	0	—	—	—	—	—
1981–82	Vancouver Canucks	NHL	59	18	15	33	20	3	0	0	0	0
1982–83	Vancouver Canucks	NHL	17	3	4	7	2	2	0	2	2	0
1982–83	Fredericton Express	AHL	60	29	37	66	20	7	2	3	5	2
1983–84	WAT Stadlau	AUT	26	30	32	62	—	—	—	—	—	—
1983–84	Montana Magic	CHL	4	1	0	1	0	—	—	—	—	—
1984–85	WAT Stadlau	AUT	34	37	29	66	30	—	—	—	—	—
1985–86	EV Innsbruck	AUT	23	20	18	38	8	10	9	11	20	—
WHA totals			476	171	165	336	153	39	20	21	41	12
NHL totals			219	91	100	191	65	11	0	6	6	2
AUT totals			83	87	79	166	—	10	9	11	20	—

Preceded by Ron Chipperfield	Edmonton Oilers captain 1980–81	Succeeded by Lee Fogolin
