= Paul MacKinnon =

Canadian ice hockey player

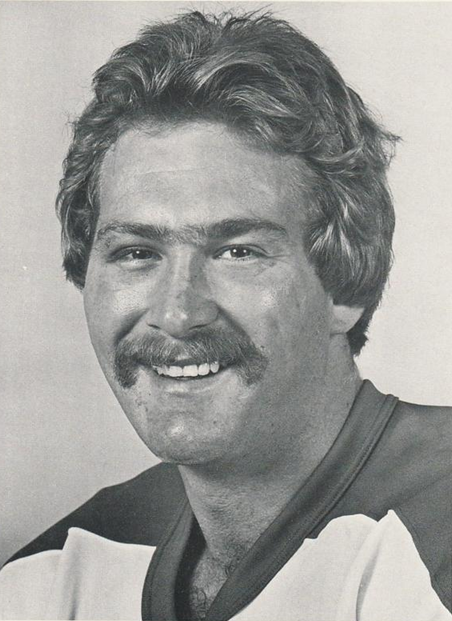
- MacKinnon in 1980 photo
- Born: November 6, 1958 (age 67) Brantford, Ontario, Canada
- Height: 6 ft 0 in (183 cm)
- Weight: 195 lb (88 kg; 13 st 13 lb)
- Position: Defence
- Played for: Winnipeg Jets; Washington Capitals
- NHL draft: 23rd overall, 1978; Washington Capitals
- Playing career: 1978–1984

Paul Gregory MacKinnon (born November 6, 1958) is a Canadian former professional ice hockey defenceman.

MacKinnon was born in Brantford, Ontario. Selected by the Washington Capitals in the 1978 NHL entry draft, MacKinnon signed to play with the Winnipeg Jets of the World Hockey Association. The Capitals reclaimed MacKinnon back prior to the 1979–80 season, where he played until the end of the 1983–84 NHL season.

== Career statistics ==
=== Regular season and playoffs ===
			Regular season					Playoffs
Season	Team	League	GP	G	A	Pts	PIM	GP	G	A	Pts	PIM
1975–76	Peterborough Petes	OHA	48	1	10	11	42	––	––	––	––	––
1976–77	Peterborough Petes	OHA	65	2	38	40	96	––	––	––	––	––
1977–78	Peterborough Petes	OHA	60	1	25	26	77	––	––	––	––	––
1978–79	Winnipeg Jets	WHA	73	2	15	17	70	10	2	5	7	4
1979–80	Washington Capitals	NHL	63	1	11	12	22	––	––	––	––	––
1980–81	Washington Capitals	NHL	14	0	0	0	22	––	––	––	––	––
1981–82	Washington Capitals	NHL	39	2	9	11	35	––	––	––	––	––
1981–82	Hershey Bears	AHL	26	4	17	21	30	5	0	0	0	2
1982–83	Washington Capitals	NHL	19	2	2	4	8	––	––	––	––	––
1982–83	Hershey Bears	AHL	59	2	14	16	32	5	1	0	1	0
1983–84	Washington Capitals	NHL	12	0	1	1	4	––	––	––	––	––
1983–84	Hershey Bears	AHL	63	3	19	22	29	––	––	––	––	––
WHA totals			73	2	15	17	70	10	2	5	7	4
NHL totals			147	5	23	28	91	—	—	—	—	—
