= Dave Semenko =

Canadian ice hockey player (1957–2017)

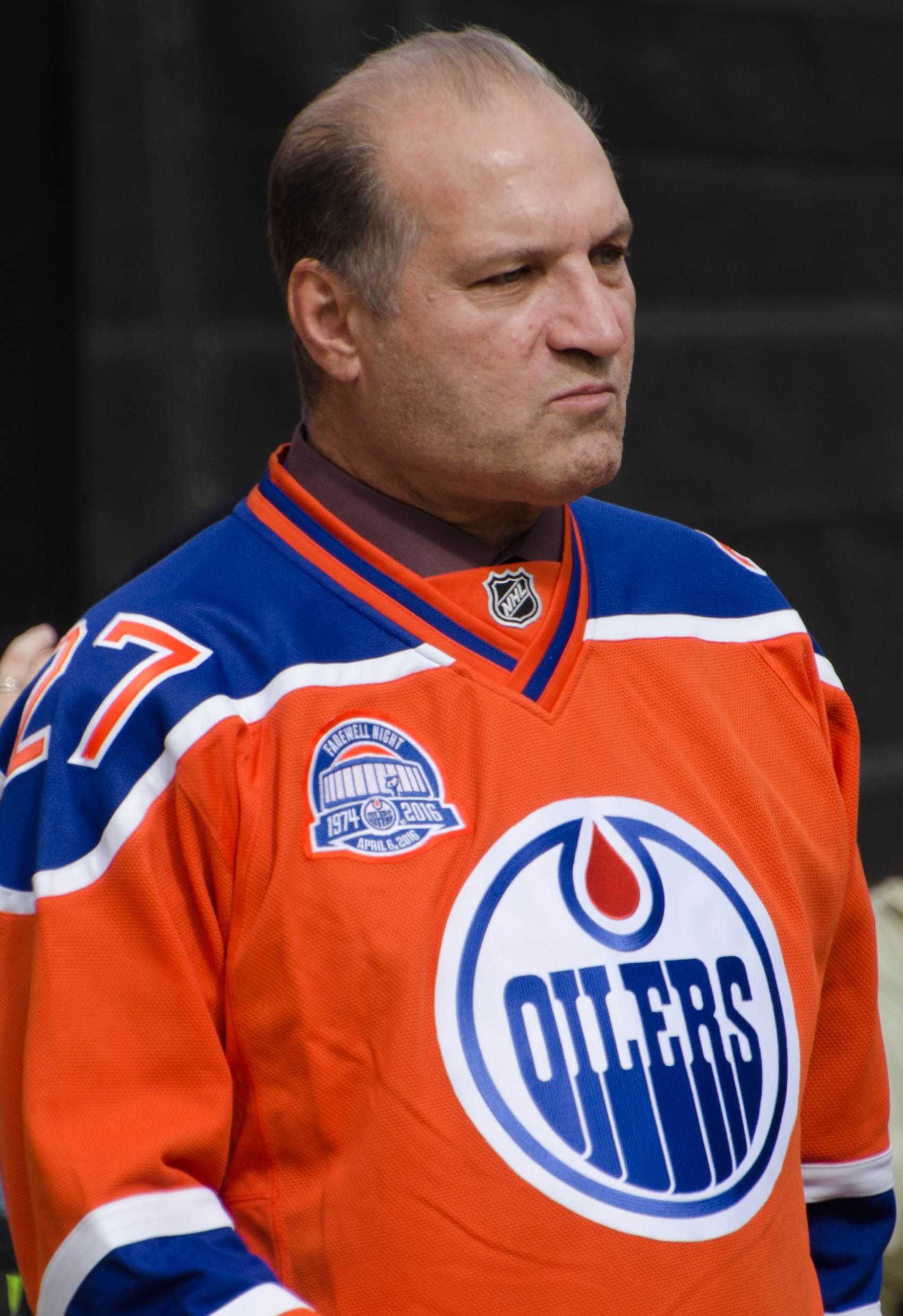
- Semenko in 2016
- Born: July 12, 1957 Winnipeg, Manitoba, Canada
- Died: June 29, 2017 (aged 59) Edmonton, Alberta, Canada
- Height: 6 ft 3 in (191 cm)
- Weight: 215 lb (98 kg; 15 st 5 lb)
- Position: Left wing
- Shot: Left
- Played for: Edmonton Oilers; Hartford Whalers; Toronto Maple Leafs
- NHL draft: 25th overall, 1977; Minnesota North Stars
- WHA draft: 21st overall, 1977; Houston Aeros
- Playing career: 1977–1988

David John Semenko (July 12, 1957 – June 29, 2017) was a Canadian professional ice hockey player, coach, scout, and colour commentator. During his National Hockey League (NHL) career, Semenko played for the Edmonton Oilers, Hartford Whalers and Toronto Maple Leafs as an enforcer. During his tenure with Edmonton, he notably protected Wayne Gretzky as an "on-ice bodyguard" during Gretzky's early career. Semenko won two Stanley Cups with the Oilers in 1984 and 1985. He was also the last player to score a goal in the World Hockey Association (WHA) before it folded and merged with the NHL.

Following his retirement as a player, he became a radio commentator of Oilers' games. Semenko died on June 29, 2017, from liver and pancreatic cancer.

== Career ==
Semenko played junior hockey for the Brandon Wheat Kings. He was originally selected 25th overall in 1977 by the Minnesota North Stars of the NHL and the Houston Aeros of the World Hockey Association (WHA).

The Aeros traded Semenko to the Oilers just before their 1977–78 season. He spent his first two professional years as a member of the Oilers in the WHA before the NHL–WHA merger. He scored the final goal in WHA history in game six of the 1979 Avco Cup Final, which the Oilers lost to the Winnipeg Jets.

When the Oilers joined the NHL, Semenko's rights were retained by the North Stars. The Oilers traded their second- and third-round draft picks in the 1979 NHL entry draft to acquire his rights from the North Stars, who then drafted future United States Hockey Hall of Famer Neal Broten. The trade also gave the Oilers a third-round pick, which was used to select future Oilers superstar and Hockey Hall of Famer Mark Messier.

An acknowledged enforcer, Semenko was Wayne Gretzky's "on-ice bodyguard" early in Gretzky's career in Edmonton, beginning in the WHA in 1978 and ending when Semenko was traded to the Hartford Whalers in 1986. Semenko is considered one of the toughest players ever in the NHL. After Gretzky won a car for being chosen as the MVP of the 1983 NHL All-Star game, he gifted the car to Semenko to show his appreciation for his on-ice work.

Semenko fought boxing legend Muhammad Ali in an exhibition on June 12, 1983. The match was officially a draw after going three rounds, but the Associated Press reported Ali was not seriously trying and was just toying with Semenko.

After brief stops with the Hartford Whalers and Toronto Maple Leafs, Semenko retired following the 1987–88 season. He finished his 575-game NHL career with 65 goals, 153 points, and 1,175 penalty minutes. Semenko also recorded 70 fights over his career.

== Retirement and death ==
After retiring, Semenko became a colour commentator on Oilers radio broadcasts and was an assistant coach with the Oilers during the 1996–97 season. He also served as a professional scout for the team from 1997 until 2015.

Semenko died on June 29, 2017, at the age of 59, shortly after being diagnosed with liver and pancreatic cancer. His funeral was held at Rogers Place in Edmonton.

== Career statistics ==
			Regular season					Playoffs
Season	Team	League	GP	G	A	Pts	PIM	GP	G	A	Pts	PIM
1974–75	Brandon Travellers	MJHL	42	11	17	28	55	—	—	—	—	—
1974–75	Brandon Wheat Kings	WCHL	12	2	1	3	12	4	0	0	0	0
1975–76	Brandon Wheat Kings	WCHL	72	8	5	13	194	5	0	0	0	0
1976–77	Brandon Wheat Kings	WCHL	61	27	33	60	265	16	3	4	7	61
1977–78	Brandon Wheat Kings	WCHL	7	10	5	15	40	—	—	—	—	—
1977–78	Edmonton Oilers	WHA	65	6	6	12	140	5	0	0	0	8
1978–79	Edmonton Oilers	WHA	77	10	14	24	158	11	4	2	6	29
1979–80	Edmonton Oilers	NHL	67	6	7	13	135	3	0	0	0	2
1980–81	Edmonton Oilers	NHL	58	11	8	19	80	8	0	0	0	5
1980–81	Wichita Wind	CHL	14	1	2	3	40	—	—	—	—	—
1981–82	Edmonton Oilers	NHL	59	12	12	24	194	4	0	0	0	2
1982–83	Edmonton Oilers	NHL	75	12	15	27	141	15	1	1	2	69
1983–84	Edmonton Oilers	NHL	52	6	11	17	118	16	5	5	10	44
1984–85	Edmonton Oilers	NHL	69	6	12	18	172	14	0	0	0	39
1985–86	Edmonton Oilers	NHL	69	6	12	18	141	6	0	0	0	32
1986–87	Edmonton Oilers	NHL	5	0	0	0	0	—	—	—	—	—
1986–87	Hartford Whalers	NHL	51	4	8	12	87	4	0	0	0	15
1987–88	Toronto Maple Leafs	NHL	70	2	3	5	107	—	—	—	—	—
WHA totals			142	16	20	36	298	16	4	2	6	37
NHL totals			575	65	88	153	1175	73	6	6	12	208

== Awards and achievements ==
- 2x Stanley Cup Championships (1984 & 1985)
- Honoured Member of the Manitoba Hockey Hall of Fame

== Exhibition boxing record ==
1 fight	0 wins	0 losses
Draws	1	

No.	Result	Record	Opponent	Type	Round, time	Date	Location	Notes
1	Draw	0–0–1	(United States) Muhammad Ali	PTS	3	Jun 12, 1983	Northlands Coliseum, Edmonton, Alberta, Canada	
