= Ron Chipperfield =

Canadian ice hockey player (born 1954)

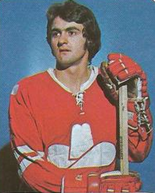
- 1975-76 card of Chipperfield
- Born: March 28, 1954 (age 72) Brandon, Manitoba, Canada
- Height: 5 ft 11 in (180 cm)
- Weight: 186 lb (84 kg; 13 st 4 lb)
- Position: Centre
- Shot: Right
- Played for: Vancouver Blazers; Calgary Cowboys; Edmonton Oilers; Quebec Nordiques
- NHL draft: 17th overall, 1974; California Seals
- WHA draft: 20th overall, 1974; Vancouver Blazers
- Playing career: 1974–1984

Ronald James Chipperfield (born March 28, 1954) is a Canadian former professional ice hockey player who served as the Edmonton Oilers' first National Hockey League (NHL) captain. He played for the Oilers in both the World Hockey Association (WHA) and the NHL, as well as the Vancouver Blazers and the Calgary Cowboys of the WHA, and the Quebec Nordiques of the NHL. Chipperfield was born in Brandon, Manitoba.

== Playing career ==
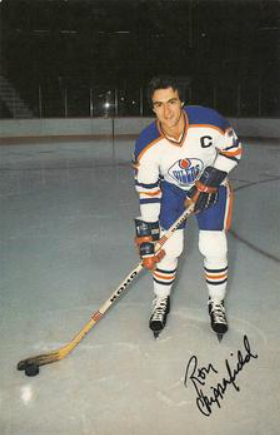
1979 postcard of Chipperfield for Edmonton Oilers

Chipperfield started his junior career in 1969–70 with the Dauphin Kings of the Manitoba Junior Hockey League (MJHL), leading the league in scoring. The Kings won the MJHL championship and advanced to the 1970 Memorial Cup western semi-final before bowing out. Next, he spent four years with Brandon Wheat Kings of the Western Canadian Hockey League (WCHL), where he set numerous team and league records. His most successful year there was his last, 1973–74, when he scored 90 goals, setting a league record at the time, won the scoring title, and was named league MVP.

Chipperfield was drafted in 1974 by the California Golden Seals in the first round, 17th overall, of the 1974 NHL amateur draft, and in the second round, 20th overall of the 1974 WHA Amateur Draft by the Vancouver Blazers. He joined the Blazers, spending a year with the team before it moved to Calgary and became the Calgary Cowboys. Chipperfield played two seasons for the Cowboys, then a three-year run with the Edmonton Oilers. In his third season with the team, the Oilers joined the National Hockey League. Chipperfield made his NHL debut in 1979 and went on to score 22 goals and 45 points that season. In March of that season, the Oilers traded him to the Quebec Nordiques for goaltender Ron Low, a former teammate in Dauphin. Chipperfield played just four games with the Nordiques the following year and then took his skills to the top league in Italy in 1981. That season he scored a league-leading 78 goals and 128 points in just 39 games. His final three seasons were spent there, playing for HC Bolzano.

== Awards and achievements ==
- MJHL Co-Goal Scoring Leader (1970)
- Turnbull Cup MJHL Champions (1970)
- WCHL All-Star Team (1974)
- WCHL Scoring Champion (1974)
- WCHL MVP (1974)
- Honoured Member of the Manitoba Hockey Hall of Fame

== Career statistics ==
			Regular season					Playoffs
Season	Team	League	GP	G	A	Pts	PIM	GP	G	A	Pts	PIM
1969–70	Dauphin Kings	MJHL	34	39	40	79	18	—	—	—	—	—
1969–70	Dauphin Kings	M-Cup	—	—	—	—	—	6	3	1	4	0
1970–71	Brandon Wheat Kings	WCJHL	64	40	43	83	62	—	—	—	—	—
1971–72	Brandon Wheat Kings	WCJHL	63	59	53	112	29	11	8	5	13	0
1972–73	Brandon Wheat Kings	WCJHL	59	72	41	113	63	6	1	3	4	2
1973–74	Brandon Wheat Kings	WCJHL	66	90	72	162	82	—	—	—	—	—
1974–75	Vancouver Blazers	WHA	78	19	20	39	30	—	—	—	—	—
1975-76	Calgary Cowboys	WHA	75	42	41	83	32	10	5	4	9	6
1976–77	Calgary Cowboys	WHA	81	27	27	54	32	—	—	—	—	—
1977–78	Edmonton Oilers	WHA	80	33	52	85	48	5	1	1	2	0
1978–79	Edmonton Oilers	WHA	55	32	37	69	47	13	9	10	19	8
1979–80	Edmonton Oilers	NHL	67	18	19	37	24	—	—	—	—	—
1979–80	Quebec Nordiques	NHL	12	4	4	8	8	—	—	—	—	—
1980–81	Rochester Americans	AHL	6	3	2	5	6	—	—	—	—	—
1980–81	Quebec Nordiques	NHL	4	0	1	1	2	—	—	—	—	—
1981–82	HC Bozen	Serie A	30	78	50	128	40	6	10	8	18	10
1982–83	HC Bozen	Serie A	32	78	58	136	54	—	—	—	—	—
1983–84	HC Bozen	Serie A	22	19	24	43	14	5	4	8	12	8
WHA totals			369	153	177	330	189	28	15	15	30	14
NHL totals			83	22	24	46	34	—	—	—	—	—
Serie A totals			84	175	132	307	108	11	14	16	30	18

Preceded by Paul Shmyr	Edmonton Oilers captain 1979–80	Succeeded by Blair MacDonald
