= 1984 Stanley Cup Final =

1984 ice hockey championship series

| | 1 | 2 | 3 | 4 | 5 | Total |
|---|---|---|---|---|---|---|
| Edmonton Oilers | 1 | 1 | 7 | 7 | 5 | 4 |
| New York Islanders | 0 | 6 | 2 | 2 | 2 | 1 |
- Location(s): Edmonton: (Northlands Coliseum (3, 4, 5); Uniondale: (Nassau Veterans Memorial Coliseum (1, 2)
- Coaches: Edmonton: Glen Sather; New York: Al Arbour
- Captains: Edmonton: Wayne Gretzky; New York: Denis Potvin
- National anthems: Edmonton: Paul Lorieau; New York: Unknown
- Referees: Andy Van Hellemond, Dave Newell, Bryan Lewis
- Dates: May 10–19, 1984
- MVP: Mark Messier (Oilers)
- Series-winning goal: Ken Linseman (0:38, second)
- Hall of Famers: Oilers: Glenn Anderson (2008); Paul Coffey (2004); Grant Fuhr (2003); Wayne Gretzky (1999); Jari Kurri (2001); Kevin Lowe (2020); Mark Messier (2007); Islanders: Mike Bossy (1991); Clark Gillies (2002); Pat LaFontaine (2003); Denis Potvin (1991); Billy Smith (1993); Bryan Trottier (1997); Coaches: Al Arbour (1996); Glen Sather (1997); Officials: Andy Van Hellemond (1999)
- Networks: Canada: (English): CBC (French): SRC; United States: (National): USA Network (New York City area): SportsChannel New York (1–2), WOR (3–5)
- Announcers: (CBC) Bob Cole, Dick Irvin Jr., Mickey Redmond (1–2), and Gary Dornhoefer (3–5) (SRC) Rene Lecavalier and Gilles Tremblay (USA Network) Dan Kelly and Gary Green (SCNY/WOR) Jiggs McDonald and Ed Westfall

The 1984 Stanley Cup Final was the championship series of the National Hockey League's (NHL) 1983–84 season, and the culmination of the 1984 Stanley Cup playoffs. It was contested between the defending Campbell Conference champion Edmonton Oilers and the defending Wales Conference and four-time defending Stanley Cup champion New York Islanders. The upstart Oilers defeated the four-time defending champion Islanders to win their first Stanley Cup in franchise history, becoming the third post-1967 expansion team and first former World Hockey Association team to win the Cup, and also the first team based west of Chicago to win the Cup since the WCHL's Victoria Cougars became the last non-NHL team to win it in 1925.

In the previous year's Stanley Cup Final, the Islanders had swept the Oilers in four straight games. The teams met again in 1984, with the Islanders seeking their fifth consecutive Stanley Cup championship. While both teams had improved on their regular season records from the previous season, Edmonton had progressed more and finished with the best record in the NHL for the first time in their short history. However, it was New York who received home-ice advantage, as they had in 1982 since the rules in place since 1982 dictated that home-ice advantage went to the conference that won the coin toss and in 1984 because the Wales Conference had more points in head-to-head play against the Campbell Conference. It was also the first time that the Finals was played under a 2–3–2 format. This was the third time during the era that the team with the worse record received a home-ice advantage, the other two being the 1968 and 1970. Home-ice advantage reverted to the team with the better record for the following Final, and the Final reverted to the former 2–2–1–1–1 format in the Final after that.

This was the fifth straight Finals of teams that joined the NHL in 1967 or later. As of 2021, the Islanders' four consecutive Cup wins (1980, 1981, 1982, 1983) and their appearance in the 1984 Cup Final is an NHL record of 19 consecutive playoff series wins that currently stands unbroken. The 1984 Final was the third of nine consecutive Finals contested by a team from Western Canada, second of eight contested by a team from Alberta (the Oilers appeared in six, the Calgary Flames in two, the Vancouver Canucks in one), and the first of five consecutive Finals to end with the Cup presentation on Alberta ice (the Oilers won four times at home, the Montreal Canadiens once in Calgary).

The Oilers became the fastest Canadian-based expansion team to win a major sports title by winning a title in only their fifth NHL season. The feat was eclipsed in 2016 by the Ottawa Redblacks, who won the Grey Cup in their third CFL season.

To date, this is the last time the Islanders have appeared in the Stanley Cup Final, and they currently hold the second longest Finals appearance drought in the league at 40 years, the longest of any American-based team. The only team with a longer Finals appearance drought are the Toronto Maple Leafs, who last made the Final in 1967.

== Paths to the Final ==
Edmonton defeated the Winnipeg Jets 3–0, the Calgary Flames 4–3 and the Minnesota North Stars 4–0 to reach the Final.

New York defeated the New York Rangers 3–2, the Washington Capitals 4–1, and the Montreal Canadiens 4–2 to reach the Final.

== Game summaries ==
NOTE: In 1981, the NHL realigned it's conferences and divisions according to geographical regions. Along with this, it was decided to play the Stanley Cup Final in a 2-3-2 format, with home ice advantage being awarded to the division with the better aggregate record in interdivisional games. This format would be used until 1985, after which the Final would go back to a 2-2-1-1-1 format, with home ice going to the team with the better regular season record.

=== Game one ===
| May 10 | Edmonton Oilers | 1–0 | New York Islanders | Nassau Coliseum | Recap |

Grant Fuhr recorded a shutout over Islanders in the first game on the Islanders home ice, stopping 34 shots, and Kevin McClelland scoring the game's only goal early in the third period.

Scoring summary
| Period | Team | Goal | Assist(s) | Time | Score |
|---|---|---|---|---|---|
| 1st | None | | | | |
| 2nd | None | | | | |
| 3rd | EDM | Kevin McClelland (3) | Pat Hughes (9) and Dave Hunter (5) | 01:55 | 1–0 EDM |
Penalty summary
| Period | Team | Player | Penalty | Time | PIM |
| 1st | EDM | Kevin Lowe | Tripping | 08:40 | 2:00 |
| 1st | NYI | Denis Potvin | Hooking | 11:34 | 2:00 |
| 1st | EDM | Dave Hunter | Elbowing | 14:09 | 2:00 |
| 1st | NYI | Denis Potvin | Tripping | 14:51 | 2:00 |
| 1st | EDM | Don Jackson | Roughing | 15:47 | 2:00 |
| 2nd | EDM | Dave Hunter | Holding | 09:06 | 2:00 |
| 2nd | NYI | Gord Dineen | Holding | 11:52 | 2:00 |
| 2nd | EDM | Don Jackson | Cross-checking | 14:37 | 2:00 |
| 2nd | NYI | Tomas Jonsson | Holding | 15:52 | 2:00 |
| 3rd | None | | | | |

Shots by period
| Team | 1 | 2 | 3 | Total |
|---|---|---|---|---|
| Edmonton | 10 | 12 | 16 | 38 |
| New York | 14 | 12 | 8 | 34 |

=== Game two ===
| May 12 | Edmonton Oilers | 1–6 | New York Islanders | Nassau Coliseum | Recap |

The Islanders won game two 6–1, with Clark Gillies recording a hat trick and Bryan Trottier recording 2 goals and an assist.

Scoring summary
| Period | Team | Goal | Assist(s) | Time | Score |
|---|---|---|---|---|---|
| 1st | NYI | Bryan Trottier (7) | Mike Bossy (8) and Paul Boutilier (6) | 00:53 | 1–0 NYI |
| 1st | NYI | Greg Gilbert (5) – pp | Pat LaFontaine (6) and Stefan Persson (5) | 05:48 | 2–0 NYI |
| 1st | EDM | Randy Gregg (3) | Kevin McClelland (5) | 15:06 | 2–1 NYI |
| 1st | NYI | Clark Gillies (8) | Anders Kallur (2) | 18:31 | 3–1 NYI |
| 2nd | NYI | Bryan Trottier (8) | Brent Sutter (8) and Patrick Flatley (4) | 04:52 | 4–1 NYI |
| 2nd | NYI | Clark Gillies (9) – pp | Denis Potvin (5) and Mike Bossy (9) | 16:48 | 5–1 NYI |
| 3rd | NYI | Clark Gillies (10) | Bryan Trottier (9) and Paul Boutilier (7) | 17:08 | 6–1 NYI |
Penalty summary
| Period | Team | Player | Penalty | Time | PIM |
| 1st | EDM | Glenn Anderson | High-sticking | 00:09 | 2:00 |
| 1st | NYI | John Tonelli | High-sticking | 00:09 | 2:00 |
| 1st | EDM | Charlie Huddy | Hooking | 04:14 | 2:00 |
| 1st | EDM | Pat Hughes | Slashing | 06:29 | 2:00 |
| 1st | EDM | Don Jackson | Roughing | 06:29 | 2:00 |
| 1st | NYI | Duane Sutter | Slashing | 06:29 | 2:00 |
| 1st | EDM | Pat Hughes | High-sticking | 08:51 | 2:00 |
| 1st | NYI | Brent Sutter | Holding | 09:12 | 2:00 |
| 1st | EDM | Don Jackson | High-sticking | 12:11 | 2:00 |
| 1st | NYI | Greg Gilbert | High-sticking | 12:11 | 2:00 |
| 1st | NYI | Tomas Jonsson | Hooking | 12:52 | 2:00 |
| 1st | EDM | Kevin McClelland | Cross-checking | 15:42 | 2:00 |
| 1st | EDM | Kevin McClelland | Fighting – major | 15:42 | 5:00 |
| 1st | NYI | Duane Sutter | Elbowing | 15:42 | 2:00 |
| 1st | NYI | Duane Sutter | Fighting | 15:42 | 5:00 |
| 2nd | NYI | Tomas Jonsson | Hooking | 05:37 | 2:00 |
| 2nd | EDM | Glenn Anderson | High-sticking | 16:05 | 2:00 |
| 3rd | EDM | Mark Messier | High-sticking | 06:52 | 2:00 |
| 3rd | EDM | Mark Messier | Fighting – major | 06:52 | 5:00 |
| 3rd | NYI | Gord Dineen | Charging | 06:52 | 2:00 |
| 3rd | NYI | Gord Dineen | Fighting – major | 06:52 | 5:00 |
| 3rd | EDM | Wayne Gretzky | Hooking | 08:30 | 2:00 |
| 3rd | EDM | Dave Semenko | Roughing | 15:16 | 2:00 |
| 3rd | EDM | Ken Linseman | Roughing | 17:25 | 2:00 |
| 3rd | EDM | Ken Linseman | Fighting – major | 17:25 | 5:00 |
| 3rd | EDM | Ken Linseman | Misconduct | 17:25 | 10:00 |
| 3rd | EDM | Dave Lumley | Fighting – major | 17:25 | 5:00 |
| 3rd | EDM | Dave Lumley | Game misconduct | 17:25 | 10:00 |
| 3rd | NYI | Gord Dineen | Fighting – major | 17:25 | 5:00 |
| 3rd | NYI | Gord Dineen | Game misconduct | 17:25 | 10:00 |
| 3rd | NYI | Greg Gilbert | Roughing – double minor | 17:25 | 4:00 |
| 3rd | NYI | Greg Gilbert | Fighting – major | 17:25 | 5:00 |
| 3rd | NYI | Greg Gilbert | Game misconduct | 17:25 | 10:00 |

Shots by period
| Team | 1 | 2 | 3 | Total |
|---|---|---|---|---|
| Edmonton | 12 | 6 | 5 | 23 |
| New York | 12 | 9 | 5 | 26 |

=== Game three ===
| May 15 | New York Islanders | 2–7 | Edmonton Oilers | Northlands Coliseum | Recap |

In game three, the Islanders had a 2–1 lead in the second period, but Mark Messier scored on an individual effort to tie the game. They proceeded to beat the Islanders 7–2.

Scoring summary
| Period | Team | Goal | Assist(s) | Time | Score |
|---|---|---|---|---|---|
| 1st | NYI | Clark Gillies (11) | Patrick Flatley (5) and Brent Sutter (10) | 01:32 | 1–0 NYI |
| 1st | EDM | Kevin Lowe (3) | Glenn Anderson (9) and Willy Lindstrom (5) | 13:49 | 1–1 |
| 2nd | NYI | Clark Gillies (12) – pp | Bryan Trottier (6) and Mike Bossy (10) | 02:54 | 2–1 NYI |
| 2nd | EDM | Mark Messier (6) | Lee Fogolin (4) | 08:38 | 2–2 |
| 2nd | EDM | Glenn Anderson (6) | Charlie Huddy (7) and Wayne Gretzky (20) | 19:12 | 3–2 EDM |
| 2nd | EDM | Paul Coffey (7) | Pat Hughes (10) and Ken Linseman (4) | 19:29 | 4–2 EDM |
| 3rd | EDM | Mark Messier (7) | Kevin McClelland (6) and Charlie Huddy (8) | 05:32 | 5–2 EDM |
| 3rd | EDM | Kevin McClelland (4) | Dave Lumley (5) | 05:52 | 6–2 EDM |
| 3rd | EDM | Dave Semenko (5) | Jari Kurri (10) and Wayne Gretzky (21) | 09:41 | 7–2 EDM |
Penalty summary
| Period | Team | Player | Penalty | Time | PIM |
| 1st | EDM | Ken Linseman | High-sticking | 02:27 | 2:00 |
| 1st | NYI | Duane Sutter | High-sticking | 02:27 | 2:00 |
| 1st | NYI | Brent Sutter | Hooking | 06:30 | 2:00 |
| 1st | EDM | Kevin McClelland | Interference | 08:49 | 2:00 |
| 1st | NYI | Tomas Jonsson | Interference | 10:59 | 2:00 |
| 1st | EDM | Lee Fogolin | Holding | 14:32 | 2:00 |
| 1st | EDM | Randy Gregg | Roughing | 15:16 | 2:00 |
| 1st | NYI | Don Jackson | Fighting – major | 15:16 | 5:00 |
| 1st | NYI | Patrick Flatley | Roughing – double minor | 15:16 | 4:00 |
| 1st | NYI | Greg Gilbert | Fighting – major | 15:16 | 5:00 |
| 1st | EDM | Ken Linseman | High-sticking | 17:53 | 2:00 |
| 1st | NYI | John Tonelli | High-sticking | 17:53 | 2:00 |
| 2nd | EDM | Dave Hunter | Elbowing | 01:55 | 2:00 |
| 2nd | NYI | Brent Sutter | Holding | 03:34 | 2:00 |
| 2nd | NYI | Jaroslav Pouzar | Tripping | 10:00 | 2:00 |
| 2nd | EDM | Jaroslav Pouzar | Roughing | 14:22 | 2:00 |
| 2nd | NYI | Bryan Trottier | Roughing | 14:22 | 2:00 |
| 2nd | EDM | Lee Fogolin | High-sticking | 17:53 | 2:00 |
| 2nd | EDM | Lee Fogolin | Roughing | 17:53 | 2:00 |
| 2nd | NYI | Duane Sutter | High-sticking | 17:53 | 2:00 |
| 2nd | NYI | Duane Sutter | Roughing | 17:53 | 2:00 |
| 3rd | EDM | Jaroslav Pouzar | High-sticking | 06:16 | 2:00 |
| 3rd | EDM | Glenn Anderson | Tripping | 06:56 | 2:00 |
| 3rd | EDM | Glenn Anderson | High-sticking | 14:19 | 2:00 |
| 3rd | NYI | Ken Morrow | High-sticking | 14:19 | 2:00 |
| 3rd | EDM | Kevin McClelland | High-sticking | 19:37 | 2:00 |
| 3rd | NYI | Roland Melanson | High-sticking | 19:37 | 2:00 |

Shots by period
| Team | 1 | 2 | 3 | Total |
|---|---|---|---|---|
| New York | 10 | 8 | 7 | 25 |
| Edmonton | 11 | 12 | 17 | 40 |

=== Game four ===
| May 17 | New York Islanders | 2–7 | Edmonton Oilers | Northlands Coliseum | Recap |

Grant Fuhr was injured in game three, and Andy Moog had to replace him. The Oilers won game four by the same score, with Wayne Gretzky and Willy Lindstrom both scoring two goals.

Scoring summary
| Period | Team | Goal | Assist(s) | Time | Score |
|---|---|---|---|---|---|
| 1st | EDM | Wayne Gretzky (10) | Dave Semenko (4) and Jari Kurri (11) | 01:53 | 1–0 EDM |
| 1st | EDM | Willy Lindstrom (4) | Glenn Anderson (10) | 03:22 | 2–0 EDM |
| 1st | NYI | Brent Sutter (4) | Greg Gilbert (7) and Ken Morrow (2) | 14:03 | 2–1 EDM |
| 1st | EDM | Mark Messier (8) | Unassisted | 17:54 | 3–1 EDM |
| 2nd | EDM | Willy Lindstrom (5) – pp | Paul Coffey (13) and Mark Messier (18) | 05:21 | 4–1 EDM |
| 2nd | EDM | Pat Conacher (1) | Pat Hughes (11) | 06:58 | 5–1 EDM |
| 2nd | EDM | Paul Coffey (8) | Jari Kurri (12) and Dave Semenko (5) | 10:52 | 6–1 EDM |
| 2nd | NYI | Patrick Flatley (9) | Clark Gillies (5) and Stefan Persson (6) | 19:44 | 6–2 EDM |
| 3rd | EDM | Wayne Gretzky (11) | Unassisted | 14:01 | 7–2 EDM |
Penalty summary
| Period | Team | Player | Penalty | Time | PIM |
| 1st | NYI | Bob Nystrom | High-sticking | 04:41 | 2:00 |
| 1st | EDM | Dave Lumley | Elbowing | 13:40 | 2:00 |
| 1st | NYI | Denis Potvin | Roughing | 13:40 | 2:00 |
| 1st | NYI | Dave Langevin | High-sticking – major | 15:43 | 5:00 |
| 1st | EDM | Wayne Gretzky | Unsportsmanlike conduct | 17:31 | 2:00 |
| 1st | EDM | Jari Kurri | High-sticking | 17:31 | 2:00 |
| 1st | NYI | Ken Morrow | Cross-checking | 17:31 | 2:00 |
| 1st | EDM | Kevin Lowe | Holding | 18:25 | 5:00 |
| 1st | EDM | Ken Linseman | High-sticking – major | 18:51 | 5:00 |
| 2nd | NYI | Bobby Nystrom | Hooking | 04:47 | 2:00 |
| 2nd | EDM | Kevin McClelland | Fighting – major | 13:47 | 5:00 |
| 2nd | NYI | Duane Sutter | Roughing | 13:47 | 2:00 |
| 2nd | NYI | Duane Sutter | Fighting – major | 13:47 | 5:00 |
| 3rd | EDM | Charlie Huddy | Slashing | 06:36 | 2:00 |

Shots by period
| Team | 1 | 2 | 3 | Total |
|---|---|---|---|---|
| New York | 7 | 7 | 7 | 21 |
| Edmonton | 16 | 10 | 12 | 38 |

=== Game five ===
| May 19 | New York Islanders | 2–5 | Edmonton Oilers | Northlands Coliseum | Recap |

The Oilers then won game five by the score of 5–2 thanks to Gretzky's two first-period goals, and two Duane Sutter penalties. They became the first former WHA team, and the first team from Edmonton, to win the Stanley Cup. Mark Messier was awarded with the Conn Smythe Trophy as playoff MVP.

Scoring summary
| Period | Team | Goal | Assist(s) | Time | Score |
|---|---|---|---|---|---|
| 1st | EDM | Wayne Gretzky (12) | Jari Kurri (13) | 12:08 | 1–0 EDM |
| 1st | EDM | Wayne Gretzky (13) | Jari Kurri (14) | 17:26 | 2–0 EDM |
| 2nd | EDM | Ken Linseman (10) – pp | Charlie Huddy (9) and Wayne Gretzky (22) | 00:38 | 3–0 EDM |
| 2nd | EDM | Jari Kurri (14) – pp | Paul Coffey (14) and Glenn Anderson (11) | 04:59 | 4–0 EDM |
| 3rd | NYI | Pat LaFontaine (2) | Patrick Flatley (6) and Clark Gillies (6) | 00:13 | 4–1 EDM |
| 3rd | NYI | Pat LaFontaine (3) | Clark Gillies (7) | 00:35 | 4–2 EDM |
| 3rd | EDM | Dave Lumley (2) – en | Unassisted | 19:47 | 5–2 EDM |
Penalty summary
| Period | Team | Player | Penalty | Time | PIM |
| 1st | EDM | Bench (served by Willy Lindstrom) | Too many men on the ice | 00:47 | 2:00 |
| 1st | NYI | Patrick Flatley | Elbowing | 04:09 | 2:00 |
| 1st | NYI | Stefan Persson | High-sticking | 07:43 | 2:00 |
| 1st | NYI | Duane Sutter | Roughing | 18:47 | 2:00 |
| 2nd | NYI | Duane Sutter | Hooking | 04:19 | 2:00 |
| 2nd | EDM | Dave Semenko | High-sticking | 10:22 | 2:00 |
| 3rd | NYI | Patrick Flatley | Interference | 16:45 | 2:00 |

Shots by period
| Team | 1 | 2 | 3 | Total |
|---|---|---|---|---|
| New York | 8 | 6 | 11 | 25 |
| Edmonton | 9 | 5 | 9 | 23 |

== Broadcasting ==
The series aired on CBC in Canada and on the USA Network in the United States. CBC's broadcast team consisted of Bob Cole, Dick Irvin Jr., and Gary Dornhoefer. USA's national coverage was blacked out in the New York area due to the local rights to Islanders games in that TV market, with SportsChannel New York airing games one and two, and WOR televising the other three games.

== Team rosters ==
=== Edmonton Oilers ===
| # | Nat | Player | Position | Hand | Age | Acquired | Place of birth | Finals appearance |
|---|---|---|---|---|---|---|---|---|
| 9 | (Canada) | Glenn Anderson | RW | L | 23 | 1979 | Vancouver, British Columbia | second (1983) |
| 15 | (Canada) | Pat Conacher | C | L | 25 | 1983–84 | Edmonton, Alberta | first |
| 7 | (Canada) | Paul Coffey | D | L | 22 | 1980 | Weston, Ontario | second (1983) |
| 2 | (United States) | Lee Fogolin | D | R | 29 | 1979–80 | Chicago, Illinois | second (1983) |
| 31 | (Canada) | Grant Fuhr | G | R | 21 | 1981 | Spruce Grove, Alberta | second (1983) |
| 21 | (Canada) | Randy Gregg | D | L | 28 | 1981–82 | Edmonton, Alberta | second (1983) |
| 99 | (Canada) | Wayne Gretzky – C | C | L | 23 | 1979–80 | Brantford, Ontario | second (1983) |
| 22 | (Canada) | Charlie Huddy | D | L | 24 | 1980–81 | Oshawa, Ontario | second (1983) |
| 16 | (Canada) | Pat Hughes | RW | R | 29 | 1980–81 | Calgary, Alberta | third (1979, 1983) |
| 12 | (Canada) | Dave Hunter | LW | L | 26 | 1979–80 | Petrolia, Ontario | second (1983) |
| 29 | (United States) | Don Jackson | D | L | 27 | 1981–82 | Minneapolis, Minnesota | second (1983) |
| 17 | (Finland) | Jari Kurri | RW | R | 24 | 1980 | Helsinki, Finland | second (1983) |
| 19 | (Sweden) | Willy Lindstrom | RW | L | 33 | 1982–83 | Grums, Sweden | second (1983) |
| 13 | (Canada) | Ken Linseman | C | L | 25 | 1982–83 | Kingston, Ontario | third (1980, 1983) |
| 4 | (Canada) | Kevin Lowe | D | L | 25 | 1979 | Lachute, Quebec | second (1983) |
| 20 | (Canada) | Dave Lumley | RW | R | 29 | 1979–80 | Toronto, Ontario | second (1983) |
| 24 | (Canada) | Kevin McClelland | C | R | 21 | 1983–84 | Oshawa, Ontario | first |
| 11 | (Canada) | Mark Messier | C | L | 23 | 1979 | Edmonton, Alberta | second (1983) |
| 35 | (Canada) | Andy Moog | G | L | 24 | 1980 | Penticton, British Columbia | second (1983) |
| 10 | (Czechoslovakia) | Jaroslav Pouzar | LW | L | 32 | 1982 | Cakov, Czechoslovakia | second (1983) |
| 27 | (Canada) | Dave Semenko | LW | L | 26 | 1979–80 | Winnipeg, Manitoba | second (1983) |

=== New York Islanders ===
| # | Nat | Player | Position | Hand | Age | Acquired | Place of birth | Finals appearance |
|---|---|---|---|---|---|---|---|---|
| 22 | (Canada) | Mike Bossy | RW | R | 27 | 1977 | Montreal, Quebec | fifth (1980, 1981, 1982, 1983) |
| 14 | (Canada) | Bob Bourne | LW | L | 29 | 1974–75 | Kindersley, Saskatchewan | fifth (1980, 1981, 1982, 1983, did not play) |
| 4 | (Canada) | Paul Boutilier | D | L | 21 | 1981 | Sydney, Nova Scotia | second (1983) |
| 25 | (Canada) | Billy Carroll | C | L | 25 | 1979 | Toronto, Ontario | fourth (1981, 1982, 1983) |
| 2 | (Canada) | Gord Dineen | D | R | 21 | 1981 | Toronto, Ontario | first |
| 8 | (Canada) | Patrick Flatley | RW | R | 20 | 1982 | Toronto, Ontario | first |
| 17 | (Canada) | Greg Gilbert | LW | L | 22 | 1980 | Mississauga, Ontario | third (1982, 1983) |
| 9 | (Canada) | Clark Gillies | LW | L | 30 | 1974 | Moose Jaw, Saskatchewan | fifth (1980, 1981, 1982, 1983) |
| 91 | (Canada) | Butch Goring | C | L | 34 | 1979–80 | Winnipeg, Manitoba | fifth (1980, 1981, 1982, 1983) |
| 20 | (Sweden) | Mats Hallin | LW | L | 26 | 1981–82 | Akers styckebruk, Sweden | second (1983) |
| 3 | (Sweden) | Tomas Jonsson | D | R | 24 | 1979 | Falun, Sweden | third (1982, 1983) |
| 28 | (Sweden) | Anders Kallur | RW | L | 31 | 1979–80 | Ludvika, Sweden | fifth (1980, 1981, 1982, 1983) |
| 16 | (United States) | Pat LaFontaine | C | R | 19 | 1983 | St. Louis, Missouri | first |
| 24 | (Canada) | Gord Lane | D | L | 31 | 1979–80 | Brandon, Manitoba | fifth (1980, 1981, 1982, 1983, did not play) |
| 26 | (United States) | Dave Langevin | D | L | 30 | 1974 | Saint Paul, Minnesota | fifth (1980, 1981, 1982, 1983) |
| 1 | (Canada) | Roland Melanson | G | L | 23 | 1979 | Shediac, New Brunswick | fourth (1981, 1982, 1983) |
| 11 | (Canada) | Wayne Merrick | C | L | 32 | 1977–78 | Sarnia, Ontario | fifth (1980, 1981, 1982, 1983, did not play) |
| 6 | (United States) | Ken Morrow | D | R | 27 | 1976 | Flint, Michigan | fifth (1980, 1981, 1982, 1983) |
| 23 | (Sweden) | Bob Nystrom | RW | R | 31 | 1972 | Stockholm, Sweden | fifth (1980, 1981, 1982, 1983) |
| 7 | (Sweden) | Stefan Persson | D | L | 29 | 1974 | Bjurholm, Sweden | fifth (1980, 1981, 1982, 1983) |
| 5 | (Canada) | Denis Potvin – C | D | L | 30 | 1973 | Vanier, Ontario | fifth (1980, 1981, 1982, 1983) |
| 31 | (Canada) | Billy Smith | G | L | 33 | 1972–73 | Perth, Ontario | fifth (1980, 1981, 1982, 1983) |
| 21 | (Canada) | Brent Sutter | C | R | 21 | 1980 | Viking, Alberta | third (1982, 1983) |
| 12 | (Canada) | Duane Sutter | RW | R | 24 | 1979 | Viking, Alberta | fifth (1980, 1981, 1982, 1983) |
| 27 | (Canada) | John Tonelli | LW | L | 27 | 1977 | Hamilton, Ontario | fifth (1980, 1981, 1982, 1983) |
| 19 | (Canada) | Bryan Trottier | C | L | 27 | 1974 | Val Marie, Saskatchewan | fifth (1980, 1981, 1982, 1983) |

== Stanley Cup engraving ==
The 1984 Stanley Cup was presented to Oilers captain Wayne Gretzky by NHL President John Ziegler following the Oilers 5–2 win over the Islanders in game five.

The following Oilers players and staff had their names engraved on the Stanley Cup:

1983–84 Edmonton Oilers

=== Players ===
Centres

- 11 Mark Messier*
- 13 Ken Linseman
- 15 Pat Conacher*
- 24 Kevin McClelland
- 99 Wayne Gretzky (Captain)

Wingers

- 9 Glenn Anderson
- 10 Jaroslav Pouzar
- 12 Dave Hunter
- 16 Pat Hughes
- 17 Jari Kurri
- 19 Willy Lindstrom
- 20 Dave Lumley
- 27 Dave Semenko

Defencemen

- 2 Lee Fogolin Jr.
- 4 Kevin Lowe
- 7 Paul Coffey
- 21 Randy Gregg
- 22 Charlie Huddy
- 29 Don Jackson

Goaltenders

- 31 Grant Fuhr
- 35 Andy Moog
- 33 Mike Zanier^
- * Played both centre and wing.

=== Coaching and administrative staff ===
- Peter Pocklington (Owner), Glen Sather (President/General Manager/Head Coach), Bruce MacGregor (Asst General Manager)
- John Muckler (Asst. Coach), Edward Ted Green (Asst. Coach), Barry Fraser (Director of Player Personnel/Chief Scout)
- Peter Millar (Athletic Therapist), Barrie Stafford (Trainer), Lyle Kulchisky (Asst Trainer)

=== Non-team personnel ===
- Crossed out name of Basil Pocklington (Peter Pocklington's father)^{[A]}

=== Engraving notes ===
- #17 Jari Kurri (RW) was the first Finnish-born-trained player to win the Stanley Cup.
- #31 Grant Fuhr (G) was the first black player to win the Stanley Cup.
- #10 Jaroslav Pouzar (LW) was the first Czechoslovak-born player to win the Stanley Cup.
- ^{^[A]} Basil Pocklington, father of Oilers owner Peter Pocklington, was initially engraved on the Stanley Cup. He was not directly associated with the team. The NHL subsequently marked out Basil's name on the trophy with X's. A new ring for the Cup was created in 1993, with winners from 1979 to 1991, but Basil Pocklington's name was not on it. When the Cup returned to the Hockey Hall of Fame, the abandoned ring had been damaged and could not be put back on the Stanley Cup. The Hockey Hall of Fame had Basil Pocklington's name put on the newly created Stanley Cup ring, then XXX'd out his name again. He was now listed beside his son Peter Pocklington, Owner. On the original rings, he was listed on a line between Peter Pocklington and Glen Sather. Basil's name was not added to the replica Stanley Cup also created in 1993. This is the main way people can tell the difference between the Presentation Stanley Cup and the Replica Stanley Cup. See 2004 Stanley Cup Final for the other way to tell the cups apart. Basil Pocklington was the only name that was XXX'd out until November 2021, when the Hall of Fame struck the name of 2009–10 Chicago Blackhawks video coach Brad Aldrich due to sexual assault allegations during that season.
- On the new ring, EDMONTON was misspelt "DDMONTON". An "E" was stamped twice over the first "D" to correct the mistake.

=== Player notes ===
- Each team was required to play 20 players out of a 24-man roster. The Oilers engraved 21 players' names on the Cup, leaving off four players who were dressed in the playoffs. All four players left off the Stanley Cup were awarded a Stanley Cup ring and are included on the team picture.
  - #33 Mike Zanier^ (G) – was dressed for two games in the final. He qualified to be engraved on the Stanley Cup. Edmonton did not include his name because he had not played in the NHL. The only NHL season for Zanier was 3 games in 1985 with the Oilers.
  - #6 Rick Chartraw (D) – played four games for the NY Rangers, 24 for Edmonton, and one playoff game, spending half of the regular season playing in the minors. (He is on the Stanley Cup with Montreal 1976-77-78-79.)
  - #28 Larry Melnyk (D) – played six playoff games (4 in the Conference Finals), but spent the regular season playing in the minors.
  - #25 Raimo Summanen – (LW) played two games in the regular season and five playoff games. He spent most of the regular season playing in Europe.

== See also ==
- List of Stanley Cup champions
- 1983–84 NHL season

| Preceded by New York Islanders; 1983 | Edmonton Oilers; Stanley Cup champions 1984 | Succeeded by Edmonton Oilers; 1985 |
