= 1983 Stanley Cup Final =

1983 ice hockey championship series

	1	2	3	4	Total
New York Islanders	2	6	5	4	4
Edmonton Oilers	0	3	1	2	0
- Location(s): Edmonton: Northlands Coliseum (1, 2); Uniondale: Nassau Veterans Memorial Coliseum (3, 4)
- Coaches: New York: Al Arbour; Edmonton: Glen Sather
- Captains: New York: Denis Potvin; Edmonton: Lee Fogolin
- Referees: Wally Harris, Bryan Lewis, Andy Van Hellemond
- Dates: May 10–17, 1983
- MVP: Billy Smith (Islanders)
- Series-winning goal: Mike Bossy (12:39, first)
- Hall of Famers: Islanders: Mike Bossy (1991); Clark Gillies (2002); Denis Potvin (1991); Billy Smith (1993); Bryan Trottier (1997); Oilers: Glenn Anderson (2008); Paul Coffey (2004); Grant Fuhr (2003; did not play); Wayne Gretzky (1999); Jari Kurri (2001); Kevin Lowe (2020); Mark Messier (2007); Coaches: Al Arbour (1996); Glen Sather (1997); Officials: Ray Scapinello (2008); Andy Van Hellemond (1999)
- Networks: Canada: (English): CBC (French): SRC; United States: (National): USA Network (New York City area): WOR (1–2), SportsChannel New York (3–4)
- Announcers: (CBC) Jim Robson and Gary Dornhoefer (1–2); Bob Cole and Mickey Redmond (3–4) (SRC) Rene Lecavalier and Gilles Tremblay (USA Network) Dan Kelly and Gary Green (WOR/SCNY) Jiggs McDonald and Ed Westfall

The 1983 Stanley Cup Final was the championship series of the National Hockey League's (NHL) 1982–83 season, and the culmination of the 1983 Stanley Cup playoffs. It was contested by the Campbell Conference champion Edmonton Oilers in their first-ever Finals appearance and the defending Wales Conference and Cup champion New York Islanders, in their fourth consecutive and overall Finals appearance. The Islanders swept the Oilers to win their fourth consecutive and overall Stanley Cup championship. The Islanders became the second team in NHL history to win the Stanley Cup four straight times, joining the Montreal Canadiens.

This was the fourth straight Finals of post-1967 expansion teams. The Oilers, a former World Hockey Association (WHA) franchise, stunned NHL loyalists by reaching the Finals just four years after the NHL-WHA merger. The Oilers even had the better record of the two teams, although under the format in place since the previous Final, Edmonton received home ice advantage on account of being the Campbell champion, which at the time received that advantage in odd numbered years.

This is also the most recent time that an NHL team has won the Cup four years in a row, and also the first (and, to date, only) time a North American professional sports team has won four consecutive titles in any league competition with more than twenty teams. Even if this standard is lowered to encompass league competitions of at least sixteen teams, the Islanders are still only the third and most recent franchise to accomplish such a dynasty after the New York Yankees in Major League Baseball (who have forged two such World Series dynasties - the first in the 1930s and the second in the 1950s) and the Montreal Canadiens (whose own such dynasty immediately preceded the Islanders' prior to the merger with the WHA).

Since 1983, no professional sports team on the continent has won four consecutive championships and no NHL team has won more than two consecutive championships (most recently the Florida Panthers in 2024 and 2025). This was the second of nine consecutive Finals contested by a team from Western Canada and was the first of eight consecutive Finals contested by a team from Alberta (of which the Oilers played in six and the Calgary Flames in two). Although it was not the first Stanley Cup Final to be contested by an Albertan team (the 1923 and 1924 Finals had been contested by teams from Edmonton and Calgary respectively), 1983 saw the first Finals games played in Alberta.

The Oilers would credit the Islanders' subdued post-series locker room celebration—focused more on putting ice packs on their various injuries—as teaching them the level of sacrifice and dedication needed to be champions. The Oilers would go on to win four Stanley Cups in the next five seasons—and five overall by 1990.

The 1983 Final was the only time between 1982 and 1988 that the Stanley Cup wasn't presented in Western Canada.

== Paths to the Final ==
Edmonton defeated the Winnipeg Jets 3–0, the Calgary Flames 4–1, and the Chicago Black Hawks 4–0 to advance to the Final. In eliminating Winnipeg, Calgary, and Chicago, the Oilers had won 11 of 12 games and had outscored their opponents 74–33, averaging over six goals a game and setting 16 scoring records in these three rounds. The 1983 Final marked sixty years since an Edmonton team had last contested the Stanley Cup. The 1923 Edmonton Eskimos WCHL team played the NHL's Ottawa Senators in the 1923 Stanley Cup Final, held in Vancouver. Ottawa won the two-game, total-goals series.

New York defeated the Washington Capitals 3–1, the New York Rangers 4–2, and the Boston Bruins 4–2 to reach the Final.

== Game summaries ==
Billy Smith limited the Oilers to just six goals in the four games, and shut them out in seven out of twelve periods. Smith was also noted for his slashes and feigned injuries in that series, which made him unpopular with the Edmonton Journal, which named him "PUBLIC ENEMY NO. 1", "Mr. Obnoxious", "Samaurai [sic] Billy", "Jack the Ripper" and "a creep". After a slash on Glenn Anderson's knee prevented him from practicing the next day, Oilers manager and coach Glen Sather unsuccessfully complained to the NHL that Smith deserved an attempt-to-injure match penalty, and then took his case to the press, suggesting that the Oilers could take out Smith. Smith responded, "Let's face it. If Semenko runs at me and hurts me, anything could happen, and the victim could be Gretzky. If they want blood...." Smith did, however, earn a five-minute penalty for slashing Wayne Gretzky.

In his first appearance in the Final, Gretzky assisted on four of the Oilers' six goals but failed to score himself. While no Islander was assigned to mark Gretzky, the Oilers superstar found himself checked as soon as he got the puck. The Islanders' tactics were described as a "rope-a-dope", using their experience and patience to hang on in the face of the Oilers' furious attack. The Islanders permitted Edmonton to take long shots from poor angles, but cleared the rebounds and kept the front of the net open so Smith could see. The Sutter brothers, Duane and Brent, led with seven and five points, respectively in the first three games. Duane played a particularly important role in the absence of Bossy in game one. Bossy netted his second Stanley Cup-winning goal.

After game four, the Oilers players walked past the Islanders' dressing room and noticed many of the Islanders players exhausted and covered in ice packs rather than wildly celebrating, with Wayne Gretzky suggesting that this gave the Oilers inspiration that they needed in order to win next year.

=== Game one ===
May 10	New York Islanders	2–0	Edmonton Oilers	Northlands Coliseum	Recap

The Oilers heavily outshot the Islanders in game one, but could not get anything past Billy Smith, who made 35 saves for his third shutout of the postseason. The Islanders won the game 2–0, giving them a 1–0 lead in the series.

Scoring summary
Period	Team	Goal	Assist(s)	Time	Score
1st	NYI	Duane Sutter (8)	Bob Bourne (19) and Stefan Persson (4)	05:36	1–0 NYI
2nd	None				
3rd	NYI	Ken Morrow (3) – en	Denis Potvin (10)	19:48	2–0 NYI
Penalty summary
Period	Team	Player	Penalty	Time	PIM
1st	NYI	Ken Morrow	Hooking	01:15	2:00
1st	EDM	Dave Hunter	Elbowing	03:21	2:00
1st	NYI	Stefan Persson	Tripping	09:44	2:00
1st	NYI	Billy Smith (served by Dave Langevin)	Slashing	11:10	2:00
1st	EDM	Glenn Anderson	Interference	11:19	2:00
1st	EDM	Dave Hunter	Elbowing	14:57	2:00
1st	NYI	Denis Potvin	Hooking	15:07	2:00
1st	EDM	Ken Linseman	Hooking	15:34	2:00
2nd	NYI	Tomas Jonsson	Holding	00:39	2:00
2nd	NYI	Bob Nystrom	Charging	09:27	2:00
3rd	NYI	Tomas Jonsson	Hooking	00:51	2:00
3rd	EDM	Dave Lumley	Slashing	03:18	2:00
3rd	NYI	Clark Gillies	Slashing	03:18	2:00
3rd	EDM	Glenn Anderson	Elbowing	04:27	2:00
3rd	NYI	Brent Sutter	Hooking	04:27	2:00

Shots by period
Team	1	2	3	Total
New York	13	5	6	24
Edmonton	14	12	9	35

=== Game two ===
May 12	New York Islanders	6–3	Edmonton Oilers	Northlands Coliseum	Recap

Both Sutter brothers dominated in game two, Duane recording 4 points, and Brent recording 2 goals and an assist. The Islanders would win the game 6–3, going up 2–0 in the series.

Scoring summary
Period	Team	Goal	Assist(s)	Time	Score
1st	EDM	Dave Semenko (1)	Tom Roulston (2) and Charlie Huddy (6)	08:39	1–0 EDM
1st	NYI	Tomas Jonsson (2)	Duane Sutter (8) and Brent Sutter (10)	14:21	1–1
1st	NYI	Bob Nystrom (2)	Bryan Trottier (10)	14:21	2–1 NYI
1st	NYI	Mike Bossy (16)	Denis Potvin (11)	19:17	3–1 NYI
2nd	EDM	Jari Kurri (6)	Glenn Anderson (10) and Wayne Gretzky (23)	05:07	3–2 NYI
2nd	NYI	Bob Bourne (7)	Duane Sutter (9)	08:03	4–2 NYI
2nd	NYI	Brent Sutter (8)	Ken Morrow (6) and Duane Sutter (10)	08:41	5–2 NYI
3rd	EDM	Glenn Anderson (10)	Lee Fogolin (4) and Wayne Gretzky (24)	04:48	5–3 NYI
3rd	NYI	Brent Sutter (9)	Duane Sutter (11) and Tomas Jonsson (10)	14:11	6–3 NYI
Penalty summary
Period	Team	Player	Penalty	Time	PIM
1st	NYI	Brent Sutter	Tripping	02:36	2:00
1st	EDM	Ken Linseman	Interference	04:44	2:00
1st	EDM	Pat Hughes	Cross-checking	05:17	2:00
1st	NYI	Anders Kallur	Holding	05:51	2:00
2nd	NYI	Tomas Jonsson	Interference	14:50	2:00
3rd	NYI	Stefan Persson	Holding	11:22	2:00
3rd	EDM	Jari Kurri	Slashing	13:14	2:00
3rd	EDM	Bryan Trottier	Hooking	13:27	2:00
3rd	NYI	Billy Smith (served by Bob Nystrom)	Slashing – major	17:56	5:00
3rd	EDM	Dave Lumley	Spearing – major	19:24	5:00

Shots by period
Team	1	2	3	Total
New York	9	11	5	25
Edmonton	10	9	14	33

=== Game three ===
May 14	Edmonton Oilers	1–5	New York Islanders	Nassau Coliseum	Recap

After the teams were tied 1–1 at the end of the second, the Islanders scored four goals in the third, and Billy Smith made 33 saves in net for New York, and the Islanders won the game 5–1 and take a commanding 3–0 lead in the series.

Scoring summary
Period	Team	Goal	Assist(s)	Time	Score
1st	NYI	Anders Kallur (3)	Mike Bossy (8) and Ken Morrow (7)	19:41	1–0 NYI
2nd	EDM	Jari Kurri (7) – pp	Wayne Gretzky (25)	01:05	1–1
3rd	NYI	Bob Bourne (8)	Stefan Persson (5) and Dave Langevin (2)	05:11	2–1 NYI
3rd	NYI	Ken Morrow (4)	Bryan Trottier (11) and Anders Kallur (12)	06:21	3–1 NYI
3rd	NYI	Duane Sutter (9)	Brent Sutter (11) and Bob Bourne (20)	16:43	4–1 NYI
3rd	NYI	Brent Sutter (10) – pp	Denis Potvin (12) and Duane Sutter (12)	19:02	5–1 NYI
Penalty summary
Period	Team	Player	Penalty	Time	PIM
1st	EDM	Mark Messier	Elbowing	04:01	2:00
1st	NYI	Brent Sutter	High-sticking	04:01	2:00
1st	EDM	Glenn Anderson	Holding	05:10	2:00
2nd	NYI	Bob Bourne	Hooking	00:54	2:00
2nd	EDM	Denis Potvin	Holding	03:42	2:00
2nd	NYI	Gord Lane	Elbowing	07:31	2:00
2nd	NYI	Dave Hunter	Elbowing	10:32	2:00
3rd	NYI	Bob Bourne	Tripping	08:39	2:00
3rd	EDM	Dave Hunter	Holding	18:33	2:00

Shots by period
Team	1	2	3	Total
Edmonton	11	16	7	34
New York	11	5	12	28

=== Game four ===
May 17	Edmonton Oilers	2–4	New York Islanders	Nassau Coliseum	Recap

The Islanders defeated the Oilers in game four by a score of 4–2, completing the sweep and winning their third consecutive Stanley Cup. Goaltender Billy Smith was awarded the Conn Smythe Trophy as playoffs MVP. During the third period, Edmonton forward Glenn Anderson collided with Smith and Smith dove upon the ice, resulting in referee Andy Van Hellemond handing a major penalty to Anderson.

Scoring summary
Period	Team	Goal	Assist(s)	Time	Score
1st	NYI	Bryan Trottier (8) – pp	Clark Gillies (2) and Mike Bossy (9)	11:02	1–0 NYI
1st	NYI	John Tonelli (7)	Bob Nystrom (6)	11:45	2–0 NYI
1st	NYI	Mike Bossy (17)	Bryan Trottier (12)	12:39	3–0 NYI
2nd	EDM	Jari Kurri (8)	Wayne Gretzky (26)	00:35	3–1 NYI
2nd	EDM	Mark Messier (15)	Lee Fogolin (5) and Paul Coffey (7)	19:39	3–2 NYI
3rd	NYI	Ken Morrow (5) – en	Unassisted	18:51	4–2 NYI
Penalty summary
Period	Team	Player	Penalty	Time	PIM
1st	EDM	Paul Coffey	Roughing – double minor	02:16	4:00
1st	NYI	Brent Sutter	Roughing – double minor	02:16	4:00
1st	NYI	Clark Gillies	Tripping	07:40	2:00
1st	EDM	Dave Lumley	Interference	09:54	2:00
2nd	NYI	Bob Bourne	Interference	02:44	2:00
2nd	EDM	Kevin Lowe	Interference	11:34	2:00
2nd	EDM	Don Jackson	High-sticking	11:41	2:00
2nd	NYI	Clark Gillies	High-sticking	11:41	2:00
2nd	NYI	Anders Kallur	High-sticking	12:19	2:00
3rd	EDM	Don Jackson	Roughing	05:10	2:00
3rd	NYI	Tomas Jonsson	Holding	08:16	2:00
3rd	EDM	Glenn Anderson	Slashing – major	08:26	5:00
3rd	NYI	Bryan Trottier	Interference	10:18	2:00

Shots by period
Team	1	2	3	Total
Edmonton	5	14	7	26
New York	8	12	6	26

== Broadcasting ==
The series aired on CBC in Canada and on the USA Network in the United States. USA's national coverage was blacked out in the New York area due to the local rights to Islanders games in that TV market, with WOR televising games one and two, and SportsChannel New York airing games three and four.

== Team rosters ==
=== Edmonton Oilers ===
#	Nat	Player	Position	Hand	Age	Acquired	Place of birth	Finals appearance
9	(Canada)	Glenn Anderson	RW	L	22	1979	Vancouver, British Columbia	first
7	(Canada)	Paul Coffey	D	L	21	1980	Weston, Ontario	first
14	(Canada)	Ray Cote	C	R	21	1981–82	Pincher Creek, Alberta	first
2	(United States)	Lee Fogolin – C	D	R	28	1979–80	Chicago, Illinois	first
31	(Canada)	Grant Fuhr	G	R	20	1981	Spruce Grove, Alberta	first (did not play)
21	(Canada)	Randy Gregg	D	L	27	1981–82	Edmonton, Alberta	first
99	(Canada)	Wayne Gretzky	C	L	22	1979–80	Brantford, Ontario	first
22	(Canada)	Charlie Huddy	D	L	23	1980–81	Oshawa, Ontario	first
16	(Canada)	Pat Hughes	RW	R	28	1980–81	Calgary, Alberta	second (1979)
12	(Canada)	Dave Hunter	LW	L	25	1979–80	Petrolia, Ontario	first
29	(United States)	Don Jackson	D	L	26	1981–82	Minneapolis, Minnesota	first
17	(Finland)	Jari Kurri	RW	R	22	1980	Helsinki, Finland	first
6	(Canada)	Garry Lariviere	D	R	28	1980–81	St. Catharines, Ontario	first (did not play)
19	(Sweden)	Willy Lindstrom	RW	L	32	1982–83	Grums, Sweden	first
13	(Canada)	Ken Linseman	C	L	24	1982–83	Kingston, Ontario	second (1980)
4	(Canada)	Kevin Lowe	D	L	24	1979	Lachute, Quebec	first
20	(Canada)	Dave Lumley	RW	R	28	1979–80	Toronto, Ontario	first
11	(Canada)	Mark Messier	C	L	22	1979	Edmonton, Alberta	first
35	(Canada)	Andy Moog	G	L	23	1980	Penticton, British Columbia	first
26	(Canada)	Don Nachbaur	C	L	24	1982–83	Kitimat, British Columbia	first (did not play)
10	(Czechoslovakia)	Jaroslav Pouzar	LW	L	31	1982	Cakov, Czechoslovakia	first (did not play)
24	(Canada)	Tom Roulston	RW	R	25	1979	Winnipeg, Manitoba	first
27	(Canada)	Dave Semenko	LW	L	25	1979–80	Winnipeg, Manitoba	first

=== New York Islanders ===
#	Nat	Player	Position	Hand	Age	Acquired	Place of birth	Finals appearance
22	(Canada)	Mike Bossy	RW	R	26	1977	Montreal, Quebec	fourth (1980, 1981, 1982)
14	(Canada)	Bob Bourne	LW	L	28	1974–75	Kindersley, Saskatchewan	fourth (1980, 1981, 1982)
4	(Canada)	Paul Boutilier	D	L	20	1981	Sydney, Nova Scotia	first (did not play)
25	(Canada)	Billy Carroll	C	L	24	1979	Toronto, Ontario	third (1981, 1982)
17	(Canada)	Greg Gilbert	LW	L	21	1980	Mississauga, Ontario	second (1982)
9	(Canada)	Clark Gillies	LW	L	29	1974	Moose Jaw, Saskatchewan	fourth (1980, 1981, 1982)
91	(Canada)	Butch Goring	C	L	33	1979–80	Winnipeg, Manitoba	fourth (1980, 1981, 1982)
20	(Sweden)	Mats Hallin	LW	L	25	1981–82	Akers styckebruk, Sweden	first (did not play)
3	(Sweden)	Tomas Jonsson	D	R	23	1979	Falun, Sweden	second (1982)
28	(Sweden)	Anders Kallur	RW	L	30	1979–80	Ludvika, Sweden	fourth (1980, 1981, 1982)
24	(Canada)	Gord Lane	D	L	30	1979–80	Brandon, Manitoba	fourth (1980, 1981, 1982)
26	(United States)	Dave Langevin	D	L	29	1974	Saint Paul, Minnesota	fourth (1980, 1981, 1982)
2	(Canada)	Mike McEwen	D	L	26	1980–81	Hornepayne, Ontario	fourth (1979, 1981, 1982, did not play)
1	(Canada)	Roland Melanson	G	L	22	1979	Shediac, New Brunswick	third (1981, 1982)
11	(Canada)	Wayne Merrick	C	L	31	1977–78	Sarnia, Ontario	fourth (1980, 1981, 1982)
6	(United States)	Ken Morrow	D	R	26	1976	Flint, Michigan	fourth (1980, 1981, 1982)
23	(Sweden)	Bob Nystrom	RW	R	30	1972	Stockholm, Sweden	fourth (1980, 1981, 1982)
7	(Sweden)	Stefan Persson	D	L	28	1974	Bjurholm, Sweden	fourth (1980, 1981, 1982)
5	(Canada)	Denis Potvin – C	D	L	29	1973	Vanier, Ontario	fourth (1980, 1981, 1982)
31	(Canada)	Billy Smith	G	L	32	1972–73	Perth, Ontario	fourth (1980, 1981, 1982)
21	(Canada)	Brent Sutter	C	R	20	1980	Viking, Alberta	second (1982)
12	(Canada)	Duane Sutter	RW	R	23	1979	Viking, Alberta	fourth (1980, 1981, 1982)
27	(Canada)	John Tonelli	LW	L	26	1977	Hamilton, Ontario	fourth (1980, 1981, 1982)
19	(Canada)	Bryan Trottier	C	L	26	1974	Val Marie, Saskatchewan	fourth (1980, 1981, 1982)

== Stanley Cup engraving ==
The 1983 Stanley Cup was presented to Islanders captain Denis Potvin by NHL President John Ziegler following the Islanders 4–2 win over the Oilers in game four.

The following Islanders players and staff had their names engraved on the Stanley Cup

1982–83 New York Islanders

=== Players ===
Centres

- 11 Wayne Merrick
- 19 Bryan Trottier
- 21 Brent Sutter
- 25 Billy Carroll*
- 91 Butch Goring

Wingers

- 9 Clark Gillies
- 12 Duane Sutter
- 14 Bob Bourne
- 17 Greg Gilbert
- 20 Mats Hallin
- 22 Mike Bossy
- 23 Bob Nystrom
- 27 John Tonelli
- 28 Anders Kallur

Defencemen

- 2 Mike McEwen
- 3 Tomas Jonsson
- 4 Paul Boutilier
- 5 Denis Potvin (Captain)
- 6 Ken Morrow
- 7 Stefan Persson
- 24 Gord Lane
- 26 Dave Langevin

Goaltenders

- 1 Roland Melanson
- 31 Billy Smith
- * Played both centre and wing.

=== Coaching and administrative staff ===
- John Pickett (Chairman/Owner)
- Bill Torrey (President/General Manager)
- Gerry Ehman (Asst. General Manager/Director of Scouting)
- Al Arbour (Head Coach)
- Lorne Henning (Asst, Coach)
- Ron Waske (Trainer), Jim Pickard (Asst. Trainer)

=== Members of New York Islanders 1980 to 1983 Dynasty ===
- These players and personnel (22 in all) won four Stanley Cups as members of the Islanders, and would also be a part of the Islanders in the 1984 Stanley Cup Final. The Islanders amassed an NHL record of 19 straight playoff series wins and again reach the Stanley Cup Final, but lost the 1984 Final to the Edmonton Oilers in a rematch of the 1983 series.
  - Players: Mike Bossy, Bob Bourne, Clark Gillies, Butch Goring, Lorne Henning †, Anders Kallur, Gord Lane, Dave Langevin, Wayne Merrick, Ken Morrow, Bob Nystrom, Stefan Persson, Denis Potvin, Billy Smith, Duane Sutter, John Tonelli, Bryan Trottier
  - Non-playing personnel: John Pickett (owner), Bill Torrey (general manager), Al Arbour (head coach), Gerry Ehman (Scout/later Assistant Manager), Jim Pickard, Ron Waske (Trainers) Lorne Henning †
- † Henning was a player on the 1980 team, a player-assistant coach on the 1981 team, and an assistant coach on the 1982 and 1983 teams. Henning assisted on 1980 Stanley Cup winning goal in overtime.

== See also ==
- List of Stanley Cup champions
- 1982–83 NHL season

Preceded by New York Islanders; 1982	New York Islanders; Stanley Cup champions 1983	Succeeded by Edmonton Oilers; 1984
