= 1981 Stanley Cup Final =

1981 ice hockey championship series

	1	2	3	4	5	Total
New York Islanders	6	6	7	2	5	4
Minnesota North Stars	3	3	5	4	1	1
- Location(s): Uniondale: Nassau Veterans Memorial Coliseum (1, 2, 5); Bloomington: Met Center (3, 4)
- Coaches: New York: Al Arbour; Minnesota: Glen Sonmor
- Captains: New York: Denis Potvin; Minnesota: Paul Shmyr
- Referees: Bryan Lewis, Dave Newell, Andy Van Hellemond
- Dates: May 12–21, 1981
- MVP: Butch Goring (Islanders)
- Series-winning goal: Wayne Merrick (5:37, first)
- Hall of Famers: Islanders: Mike Bossy (1991); Clark Gillies (2002); Denis Potvin (1991); Billy Smith (1993); Bryan Trottier (1997); North Stars: Dino Ciccarelli (2010); Coaches: Al Arbour (1996); Officials: John D'Amico (1993); Ray Scapinello (2008); Andy Van Hellemond (1999)
- Networks: Canada: (English): CBC (French): SRC; United States: (National): USA Network (New York City area): SportsChannel New York (1–2, 5), WOR (3–4) (Minnesota area): KMSP
- Announcers: (CBC) Bob Cole, Mickey Redmond, and Gary Dornhoefer (SRC) Rene Lecavalier and Gilles Tremblay (USA) Simulcast of CBC feed (SCNY) Jiggs McDonald and Ed Westfall (WOR) Jiggs McDonald (game 3), Tim Ryan (game 4), and Ed Westfall (KMSP) Bob Kurtz and Tom Reid

The 1981 Stanley Cup Final was the championship series of the National Hockey League's (NHL) 1980–81 season, and the culmination of the 1981 Stanley Cup playoffs. It was contested by the Minnesota North Stars, making their first Finals appearance, and the defending champion New York Islanders, in their second Finals appearance. The Islanders would defeat the North Stars in five games to repeat as Stanley Cup champions. The Islanders became the sixth franchise to repeat as Stanley Cup champions. This would be the last all-American Finals until 1991, when the North Stars faced the Pittsburgh Penguins. Butch Goring won the Conn Smythe Trophy as Most Valuable Player in the playoffs.

== Paths to the Finals ==
Minnesota defeated the Boston Bruins 3–0, the Buffalo Sabres 4–1 and the Calgary Flames 4–2 to advance to the Final.

New York defeated the Toronto Maple Leafs 3–0, the Edmonton Oilers 4–2, and the New York Rangers 4–0 to reach the Final.

== Game summaries ==
This was the first playoff meeting between these two teams. The Islanders made their second consecutive and second overall appearance in the Finals; they defeated the Philadelphia Flyers the previous year in six games. Minnesota made their first Finals appearance in their fourteenth season after entering the league in 1967. The Islanders won this year's four-game regular season series earning six of eight points. Dino Ciccarelli of the North Stars set a rookie record (since tied by Ville Leino in 2010), scoring twenty-one points (14 goals and seven assists) during the year's playoffs. The Islanders' much deeper lineup, however, won the day.

=== Game one ===
May 12	Minnesota North Stars	3–6	New York Islanders	Nassau Coliseum	Recap

Gilles Meloche started in net for Minnesota in game one, and in doing so, became the first goaltender in NHL history to wear a modern full fiberglass cage during the Stanley Cup Final. During the first period, New York forward Bob Bourne received a major penalty for spearing. Despite being forced into a lengthy penalty kill, the Islanders completely neutralized the North Stars' power play, with Anders Kallur and Bryan Trottier scoring shorthanded goals for the Islanders. Wayne Merrick also scored twice for New York in the third period, giving them a 6–3 victory and a 1–0 lead in the series.

Scoring summary
Period	Team	Goal	Assist(s)	Time	Score
1st	NYI	Anders Kallur (3)	Dave Langevin (2) and Butch Goring (9)	02:54	1–0 NYI
1st	NYI	Bryan Trottier (10) – sh	Billy Carroll (7)	14:38	2–0 NYI
1st	NYI	Anders Kallur (4) – sh	Bryan Trottier (14)	15:25	3–0 NYI
2nd	NYI	Billy Carroll (3)	Duane Sutter (1) and Bob Nystrom (5)	09:58	4–0 NYI
2nd	MNS	Kent-Erik Andersson (2)	Dino Ciccarelli (6)	13:04	4–1 NYI
3rd	NYI	Wayne Merrick (4)	Unassisted	00:58	5–1 NYI
3rd	MNS	Steve Payne (13) – pp	Craig Hartsburg (7) and Bobby Smith (15)	03:08	5–2 NYI
3rd	NYI	Wayne Merrick (5)	Dave Langevin (3) and John Tonelli (4)	13:15	6–2 NYI
3rd	MNS	Dino Ciccarelli (12)	Tom McCarthy (3)	15:14	6–3 NYI
Penalty summary
Period	Team	Player	Penalty	Time	PIM
1st	MNS	Brad Maxwell	High-sticking	06:44	2:00
1st	NYI	Bob Bourne	Spearing – major	11:12	5:00
1st	MNS	Tom McCarthy	Slashing	19:45	2:00
2nd	MNS	Greg Smith	Interference	06:06	2:00
2nd	NYI	John Tonelli	High-sticking	14:13	2:00
2nd	NYI	Bryan Trottier	Tripping	17:29	2:00
3rd	NYI	Gord Lane	Cross-checking	02:39	2:00
3rd	NYI	Bryan Trottier	Roughing	18:09	2:00

Shots by period
Team	1	2	3	Total
Minnesota	8	8	10	26
New York	10	10	3	23

=== Game two ===
May 14	Minnesota North Stars	3–6	New York Islanders	Nassau Coliseum	Recap

Don Beaupre would replace Gilles Meloche in net for the North Stars in game two. In a virtual repeat of game one, Denis Potvin and Mike Bossy both scored two goals and the Islanders won 6–3 over the North Stars again.

Scoring summary
Period	Team	Goal	Assist(s)	Time	Score
1st	MNS	Dino Ciccarelli (13) – pp	Craig Hartsburg (10) and Steve Christoff (7)	03:38	1–0 MNS
1st	NYI	Mike Bossy (14) – pp	Mike McEwen (8) and Denis Potvin (14)	04:33	1–1
1st	NYI	Bobby Nystrom (5)	Wayne Merrick (8) and John Tonelli (5)	14:39	2–1 NYI
1st	NYI	Denis Potvin (7)	Wayne Merrick (9)	17:48	3–1 NYI
2nd	MNS	Brad Palmer (8)	Neal Broten (7) and Greg Smith (5)	09:15	3–2 NYI
3rd	MNS	Steve Payne (14)	Tim Young (12) and Gordie Roberts (5)	00:30	3–3
3rd	NYI	Denis Potvin (8) – pp	Butch Goring (10)	08:00	4–3 NYI
3rd	NYI	Ken Morrow (3)	Denis Potvin (15) and Wayne Merrick (10)	11:57	5–3 NYI
3rd	NYI	Mike Bossy (15)	Bryan Trottier (15) and Bob Bourne (5)	16:22	6–3 NYI
Penalty summary
Period	Team	Player	Penalty	Time	PIM
1st	NYI	Anders Kallur	Holding	01:31	2:00
1st	NYI	Bryan Trottier	Hooking	02:15	2:00
1st	MNS	Fred Barrett	Holding	04:08	2:00
1st	NYI	Dave Langevin	Holding	04:53	2:00
1st	MNS	Al MacAdam	High-sticking	05:04	2:00
1st	NYI	Ken Morrow	High-sticking	05:04	2:00
1st	NYI	Dave Langevin	Elbowing	11:01	2:00
1st	MNS	Fred Barrett	Roughing	19:15	2:00
1st	NYI	Bob Bourne	Roughing	19:15	2:00
2nd	NYI	John Tonelli	Roughing	10:26	2:00
3rd	NYI	Denis Potvin	Tripping	03:39	2:00
3rd	MNS	Neal Broten	Hooking	06:22	2:00
3rd	MNS	Fred Barrett	High-sticking	07:01	2:00
3rd	NYI	Bryan Trottier	High-sticking	07:01	2:00
3rd	NYI	Bryan Trottier	Tripping	12:58	2:00
3rd	NYI	Denis Potvin	Closing hand on puck	13:31	2:00
3rd	MNS	Dino Ciccarelli	Roughing	16:44	2:00
3rd	MNS	Dino Ciccarelli	Misconduct	16:44	10:00
3rd	MNS	Brad Maxwell	Fighting – major	16:44	5:00
3rd	NYI	Bob Bourne	Fighting – major	16:44	5:00
3rd	NYI	Gord Lane	Roughing	16:44	2:00
3rd	NYI	Gord Lane	Misconduct	16:44	10:00

Shots by period
Team	1	2	3	Total
Minnesota	9	11	8	28
New York	11	11	16	38

=== Game three ===
May 17	New York Islanders	7–5	Minnesota North Stars	Met Center	Recap

Gilles Meloche would start in net for Minnesota game three. In a back and forth game, Butch Goring recorded a hat trick and Mike Bossy recorded 4 points after the North Stars had taken a 3–1 lead after the first period. The Islanders went on to win the game 7–5, giving them a commanding 3–0 lead in the series.

Scoring summary
Period	Team	Goal	Assist(s)	Time	Score
1st	MNS	Steve Christoff (7) – pp	Craig Hartsburg (11) and Dino Ciccarelli (7)	03:25	1–0 MNS
1st	MNS	Steve Payne (15)	Tim Young (13) and Al MacAdam (8)	14:09	2–0 MNS
1st	NYI	Mike Bossy (16)	Clark Gillies (7)	14:47	2–1 MNS
1st	MNS	Bobby Smith (7) – pp	Craig Hartsburg (12) and Steve Payne (11)	16:30	3–1 MNS
2nd	NYI	Bob Nystrom (6)	John Tonelli (6) and Wayne Merrick (11)	04:10	3–2 MNS
2nd	NYI	Butch Goring (6) – pp	Denis Potvin (16) and Mike Bossy (15)	07:16	3–3
2nd	NYI	Butch Goring (7)	Clark Gillies (8)	11:51	4–3 NYI
3rd	MNS	Steve Payne (16)	Tim Young (14) and Steve Christoff (8)	01:11	4–4
3rd	NYI	Mike Bossy (17)	Bryan Trottier (16)	02:05	5–4 NYI
3rd	NYI	Butch Goring (8)	Billy Carroll (8) and Denis Potvin (17)	06:34	6–4 NYI
3rd	MNS	Dino Ciccarelli (14)	Bobby Smith (16)	13:35	6–5 NYI
3rd	NYI	Bryan Trottier (11) – en	Mike Bossy (16) and Wayne Merrick (12)	19:16	7–5 NYI
Penalty summary
Period	Team	Player	Penalty	Time	PIM
1st	NYI	Bob Nystrom	Interference	02:10	2:00
1st	MNS	Tom Younghans	Interference	03:55	2:00
1st	MNS	Steve Payne	Holding	06:37	2:00
1st	MNS	Tom Younghans	Roughing	07:05	2:00
1st	NYI	Bob Nystrom	Roughing	07:05	2:00
1st	NYI	Bryan Trottier	Hooking	07:19	2:00
1st	NYI	Dave Langevin	Boarding	11:26	2:00
1st	NYI	Bob Nystrom	Interference	15:20	2:00
2nd	MNS	Bobby Smith	Tripping	05:39	2:00
2nd	MNS	Greg Smith	Interference	05:56	2:00
2nd	NYI	Clark Gillies	High-sticking	05:56	2:00
2nd	NYI	Clark Gillies	Interference	09:40	2:00
2nd	NYI	Bryan Trottier	Tripping	16:00	2:00
2nd	NYI	Mike McEwen	Hooking	18:25	2:00
3rd	NYI	John Tonelli	Tripping	04:15	2:00

Shots by period
Team	1	2	3	Total
New York	11	8	10	29
Minnesota	8	7	13	28

=== Game four ===
May 19	New York Islanders	2–4	Minnesota North Stars	Met Center	Recap

Steve Payne scored the game-winning goal in the third period of game four, Brad Maxwell recorded 4 assists, and Don Beaupre made 33 saves to give Minnesota a 4–2 victory to avoid being swept.

Scoring summary
Period	Team	Goal	Assist(s)	Time	Score
1st	NYI	Gord Lane (1)	Mike Bossy (17) and Bryan Trottier (17)	03:47	1–0 NYI
1st	MNS	Craig Hartsburg (3) – pp	Bobby Smith (17) and Brad Maxwell (8)	11:34	1–1
2nd	MNS	Al MacAdam (9)	Steve Payne (12) and Brad Maxwell (9)	05:15	2–1 MNS
2nd	NYI	Mike McEwen (5) – pp	John Tonelli (7) and Anders Kallur (2)	07:37	2–2
3rd	MNS	Steve Payne (17)	Brad Maxwell (12) and Al MacAdam (9)	12:26	3–2 MNS
3rd	MNS	Bobby Smith (8) – pp	Al MacAdam (10) and Brad Maxwell (11)	18:12	4–2 MNS
Penalty summary
Period	Team	Player	Penalty	Time	PIM
1st	NYI	Clark Gillies	Slashing	01:00	2:00
1st	MNS	Craig Hartsburg	Slashing	04:00	2:00
1st	NYI	Dave Langevin	Cross-checking	10:03	2:00
1st	MNS	Gordie Roberts	Hooking	12:23	2:00
1st	NYI	Clark Gillies	Roughing	13:44	2:00
1st	MNS	Curt Giles	Tripping	16:21	2:00
2nd	NYI	Bob Nystrom	Charging	03:12	2:00
2nd	MNS	Brad Palmer	Cross-checking	05:47	2:00
2nd	NYI	Denis Potvin	Elbowing	09:13	2:00
2nd	MNS	Dino Ciccarelli	Cross-checking	11:30	2:00
2nd	MNS	Dino Ciccarelli	Fighting – major	11:30	5:00
2nd	NYI	Bob Lorimer	Fighting – major	11:30	5:00
2nd	NYI	Dave Langevin	Tripping	14:54	2:00
3rd	NYI	Anders Kallur	Tripping	06:17	2:00
3rd	NYI	Denis Potvin	Holding	16:39	2:00

Shots by period
Team	1	2	3	Total
New York	12	12	11	35
Minnesota	13	10	11	34

=== Game five ===
May 21	Minnesota North Stars	1–5	New York Islanders	Nassau Coliseum	Recap

In game five, Billy Smith made 24 saves in a 5–1 victory for New York to win the series to help them win their second consecutive Stanley Cup. Butch Goring, who recorded two goals during the game, was awarded the Conn Smythe Trophy as playoffs MVP.

Scoring summary
Period	Team	Goal	Assist(s)	Time	Score
1st	NYI	Butch Goring (9) – pp	Bob Bourne (6)	05:12	1–0 NYI
1st	NYI	Wayne Merrick (6)	John Tonelli (8) and Bob Nystrom (6)	05:37	2–0 NYI
1st	NYI	Butch Goring (10)	Clark Gillies (9) and Mike Bossy (18)	10:03	3–0 NYI
1st	MNS	Steve Christoff (8)	Unassisted	16:06	3–1 NYI
2nd	NYI	Bob Bourne (4)	Billy Carroll (9) and Anders Kallur (3)	19:12	4–1 NYI
3rd	NYI	Mike McEwen (6)	Bryan Trottier (18)	17:06	5–1 NYI
Penalty summary
Period	Team	Player	Penalty	Time	PIM
1st	NYI	Bob Nystrom	Slashing	00:56	2:00
1st	MNS	Brad Palmer	Holding	03:52	2:00
1st	NYI	Bob Lorimer	Slashing	19:00	2:00
2nd	MNS	Paul Shmyr	Elbowing	07:33	2:00
2nd	MNS	Greg Smith	Cross-checking	14:43	2:00
2nd	MNS	Kevin Maxwell	Roughing	19:55	2:00
2nd	NYI	Gord Lane	Roughing	19:55	2:00
3rd	NYI	Bob Lorimer	Holding	03:47	2:00
3rd	MNS	Brad Maxwell	Slashing	07:57	2:00
3rd	NYI	John Tonelli	Slashing	07:57	2:00
3rd	NYI	Gord Lane	High-sticking	11:48	2:00
3rd	MNS	Kevin Maxwell	Slashing	16:42	2:00
3rd	NYI	Billy Smith	Slashing	16:42	2:00

Shots by period
Team	1	2	3	Total
Minnesota	15	4	6	25
New York	10	16	7	33

== Broadcasting ==
The series aired on CBC in Canada. In the United States, this was the first of five seasons that the Cup Finals aired on the USA Network. For the 1981 Finals only, USA simulcast the CBC feed instead of producing their own coverage. However, USA's national coverage was blacked out in the New York metro and Minnesota area due to the local rights to their respective teams in that markets. In the New York area, SportsChannel New York aired three games at the Nassau Veterans Memorial Coliseum, and WOR televised two games in Bloomington, Minnesota while KMSP aired every game of the series in the Minnesota area.

== Team rosters ==
=== Minnesota North Stars ===
No.	Nat	Player	Pos	S/G	Age	Acquired	Birthplace
2	(Canada)	Curt Giles	D	L	22	1978	The Pas, Manitoba
3	(Canada)	Fred Barrett	D	L	31	1970	Ottawa, Ontario
4	(Canada)	Craig Hartsburg	D	L	21	1979	Stratford, Ontario
5	(Canada)	Brad Maxwell	D	R	23	1977	Brandon, Manitoba
6	(Canada)	Paul Shmyr (C)	D	L	35	1979	Cudworth, Saskatchewan
7	(United States)	Neal Broten	C	L	21	1979	Roseau, Minnesota
8	(Sweden)	Kent-Erik Andersson	RW	R	29	1977	Örebro, Sweden
9	(Canada)	Kevin Maxwell	C	R	21	1979	Edmonton, Alberta
10	(United States)	Gordie Roberts	D	L	23	1980	Detroit, Michigan
11	(Canada)	Tom McCarthy	LW	L	20	1979	Toronto, Ontario
14	(Canada)	Brad Palmer	LW	L	19	1980	Duncan, British Columbia
15	(Canada)	Bobby Smith	C	L	23	1978	North Sydney, Nova Scotia
16	(United States)	Mike Polich	LW	L	28	1978	Hibbing, Minnesota
17	(Canada)	Tim Young	C	R	26	1975	Scarborough, Ontario
20	(Canada)	Dino Ciccarelli	RW	R	21	1980	Sarnia, Ontario
21	(United States)	Jack Carlson	LW	L	26	1979	Virginia, Minnesota
23	(Canada)	Greg Smith	D	L	25	1978	Ponoka, Alberta
25	(Canada)	Al MacAdam	RW	L	29	1978	Charlottetown, Prince Edward Island
26	(Canada)	Steve Payne	LW	L	22	1978	Toronto, Ontario
27	(Canada)	Gilles Meloche	G	L	30	1978	Montreal, Quebec
28	(United States)	Steve Christoff	C	R	23	1978	Springfield, Illinois
29	(United States)	Tom Younghans	RW	R	28	1976	Saint Paul, Minnesota
31	(Canada)	Ken Solheim	LW	L	20	1981	Hythe, Alberta
33	(Canada)	Don Beaupre	G	L	19	1980	Waterloo, Ontario

=== New York Islanders ===
No.	Nat	Player	Pos	S/G	Age	Acquired	Birthplace
1	(Canada)	Roland Melanson	G	L	20	1979	Moncton, New Brunswick
3	(Canada)	Jean Potvin	D	L	32	1979	Ottawa, Ontario
4	(Canada)	Bob Lorimer	D	L	27	1973	Toronto, Ontario
5	(Canada)	Denis Potvin (C)	D	L	27	1973	Vanier, Ontario
6	(United States)	Ken Morrow	D	R	24	1976	Davison, Michigan
7	(Sweden)	Stefan Persson	D	L	26	1974	Bjurholm, Sweden
8	(Canada)	Garry Howatt	LW	L	28	1972	Grand Centre, Alberta
9	(Canada)	Clark Gillies	LW	L	27	1974	Moose Jaw, Saskatchewan
11	(Canada)	Wayne Merrick	C	L	29	1977	Sarnia, Ontario
12	(Canada)	Duane Sutter	RW	R	21	1979	Viking, Alberta
14	(Canada)	Bob Bourne	LW	L	26	1974	Kindersley, Saskatchewan
16	(Canada)	Mike McEwen	D	L	24	1981	Hornepayne, Ontario
19	(Canada)	Bryan Trottier	C	L	24	1974	Val Marie, Saskatchewan
22	(Canada)	Mike Bossy	RW	R	24	1977	Montreal, Quebec
23	(Sweden)	Bob Nystrom	RW	R	28	1972	Stockholm, Sweden
24	(Canada)	Gord Lane	D	L	28	1979	Brandon, Manitoba
25	(Canada)	Billy Carroll	C	L	22	1979	Toronto, Ontario
26	(United States)	Dave Langevin	D	L	26	1974	Saint Paul, Minnesota
27	(Canada)	John Tonelli	LW	L	24	1977	Hamilton, Ontario
28	(Sweden)	Anders Kallur	RW	L	28	1979	Ludvika, Sweden
29	(Canada)	Hector Marini	RW	R	24	1977	Timmins, Ontario
31	(Canada)	Billy Smith	G	L	30	1972	Perth, Ontario
91	(Canada)	Butch Goring	C	L	31	1980	St. Boniface, Manitoba

== Stanley Cup engraving ==
The 1981 Stanley Cup was presented to Islanders captain Denis Potvin by NHL President John Ziegler following the Islanders 5–1 win over the North Stars in game five.

The following Islanders players and staff had their names engraved on the Stanley Cup

1980–81 New York Islanders

=== Players ===
Centres

- 11 Wayne Merrick
- 14 Bob Bourne
- 19 Bryan Trottier
- 25 Billy Carroll*
- 91 Butch Goring

Wingers

- 8 Garry Howatt
- 9 Clark Gillies
- 12 Duane Sutter
- 22 Mike Bossy
- 23 Bob Nystrom
- 27 John Tonelli
- 28 Anders Kallur
- 29 Hector Marini

Defencemen

- 5 Denis Potvin (Captain)
- 3 Jean Potvin †
- 4 Bob Lorimer
- 6 Ken Morrow
- 7 Stefan Persson
- 16 Mike McEwen
- 24 Gord Lane
- 26 Dave Langevin

Goaltenders

- 1 Roland Melanson
- 31 Billy Smith
- * Played both centre and wing.
- † Did not play in Finals. Name engraved on Stanley Cup despite not officially qualifying.^{[A]}

=== Coaching and administrative staff ===
- John Pickett (Chairman/Owner)
- Bill Torrey (President/General Manager)
- Al Arbour (Head Coach), 10 Lorne Henning (playing-Ass't Coach)
- Jim Devellano (Chief Scout), Gerry Ehman (Western Scout)
- Harry Boyd (Scout), Mario Saraceno (Scout)
- Ron Waske (Trainer), Jim Pickard (Asst. Trainer)

=== Stanley Cup engraving ===
- ^{^[A]} #3 Jean Potvin (D) – 18 games regular season games and did not dress in the playoffs. He spent the rest of year as a broadcaster. Potvin's name was put on the cup in 1981, even though he did not officially qualify.
- #10 Lorne Henning (C) – played nine regular season and one playoff game. He was the last playing-coach to win the Stanley Cup.
- A new ring was created in 1993 for the winners from 1979 to 1991. New York Islanders was misspelled. NEW YORK ILANDERS missing the first "S". Name was spelled correctly on the Replica Cup also created in 1993.

== Aftermath ==
The Islanders successfully returned to the Finals the following year. This time, they played the Vancouver Canucks and swept them to capture their third consecutive Stanley Cup championship.

The North Stars, however, lost in the first round to the Chicago Blackhawks, 3–1. The North Stars would not return to the Stanley Cup Final again until 1991, when they were defeated by the Pittsburgh Penguins, in six games.

== See also ==
- List of Stanley Cup champions
- 1980–81 NHL season

Preceded by New York Islanders; 1980	New York Islanders; Stanley Cup champions 1981	Succeeded by New York Islanders; 1982
