= Mats Hallin =

Swedish ice hockey player (born 1958)

- Born: 9 March 1958 (age 68) Åkers styckebruk, Sweden
- Height: 6 ft 2 in (188 cm)
- Weight: 200 lb (91 kg; 14 st 4 lb)
- Position: Left wing
- Shot: Left
- Played for: Malmö IF; HC Lugano; Minnesota North Stars; New York Islanders; Södertälje SK
- NHL draft: 105th overall, 1978; Washington Capitals
- Playing career: 1976–1992

Mats Göran Hallin (born 9 March 1958) is a Swedish former professional ice hockey player who played 152 games in the National Hockey League (NHL) with the New York Islanders and Minnesota North Stars between 1982 and 1986. He would win the Stanley Cup with the Islanders in 1983. He is currently the Director of European Scouting for the Chicago Blackhawks, a position he has held since 2014.

== Career statistics ==
=== Regular season and playoffs ===
			Regular season					Playoffs
Season	Team	League	GP	G	A	Pts	PIM	GP	G	A	Pts	PIM
1973–74	Åkers IF	SWE-3	13	2	0	2	—	—	—	—	—	—
1974–75	Åkers IF	SWE-3	11	5	1	6	6	—	—	—	—	—
1975–76	Åkers IF	SWE-3	20	11	17	28	—	—	—	—	—	—
1976–77	Södertälje SK	SWE	15	2	5	7	23	—	—	—	—	—
1977–78	Södertälje SK	SWE	32	6	3	9	58	—	—	—	—	—
1978–79	Södertälje SK	SWE-2	14	4	7	11	18	—	—	—	—	—
1979–80	Södertälje SK	SWE-2	31	22	19	41	84	—	—	—	—	—
1980–81	Södertälje SK	SWE	33	9	11	20	86	—	—	—	—	—
1981–82	Indianapolis Checkers	CHL	63	25	32	57	113	8	1	5	6	31
1982–83	New York Islanders	NHL	30	7	7	14	26	7	1	0	1	6
1982–83	Indianapolis Checkers	CHL	42	26	27	53	86	—	—	—	—	—
1983–84	New York Islanders	NHL	40	2	5	7	27	6	0	0	0	22
1984–85	New York Islanders	NHL	38	5	0	5	50	1	0	0	0	0
1985–86	Minnesota North Stars	NHL	38	3	2	5	86	1	0	0	0	0
1985–86	Springfield Indians	AHL	2	1	1	2	0	—	—	—	—	—
1986–87	Minnesota North Stars	NHL	6	0	0	0	4	—	—	—	—	—
1986–87	HC Lugano	NLA	4	5	2	7	14	—	—	—	—	—
1987–88	Södertälje SK	SWE	30	10	13	23	50	2	0	1	1	6
1988–89	Södertälje SK	SWE	34	10	6	16	68	5	1	1	2	8
1989–90	Malmö IF	SWE-2	24	10	8	18	30	—	—	—	—	—
1990–91	Malmö IF	SWE	38	13	14	27	48	2	0	2	2	2
1991–92	Malmö IF	SWE	34	4	9	13	68	10	1	1	2	10
SWE totals			216	54	61	115	401	19	2	5	7	26
NHL totals			152	17	14	31	193	15	1	0	1	28

=== International ===
Year	Team	Event	GP	G	A	Pts	PIM
1978	Sweden	WJC	7	5	3	8	17
Junior totals			7	5	3	8	17
