= Craig Hartsburg =

Canadian ice hockey player, coach, and scout

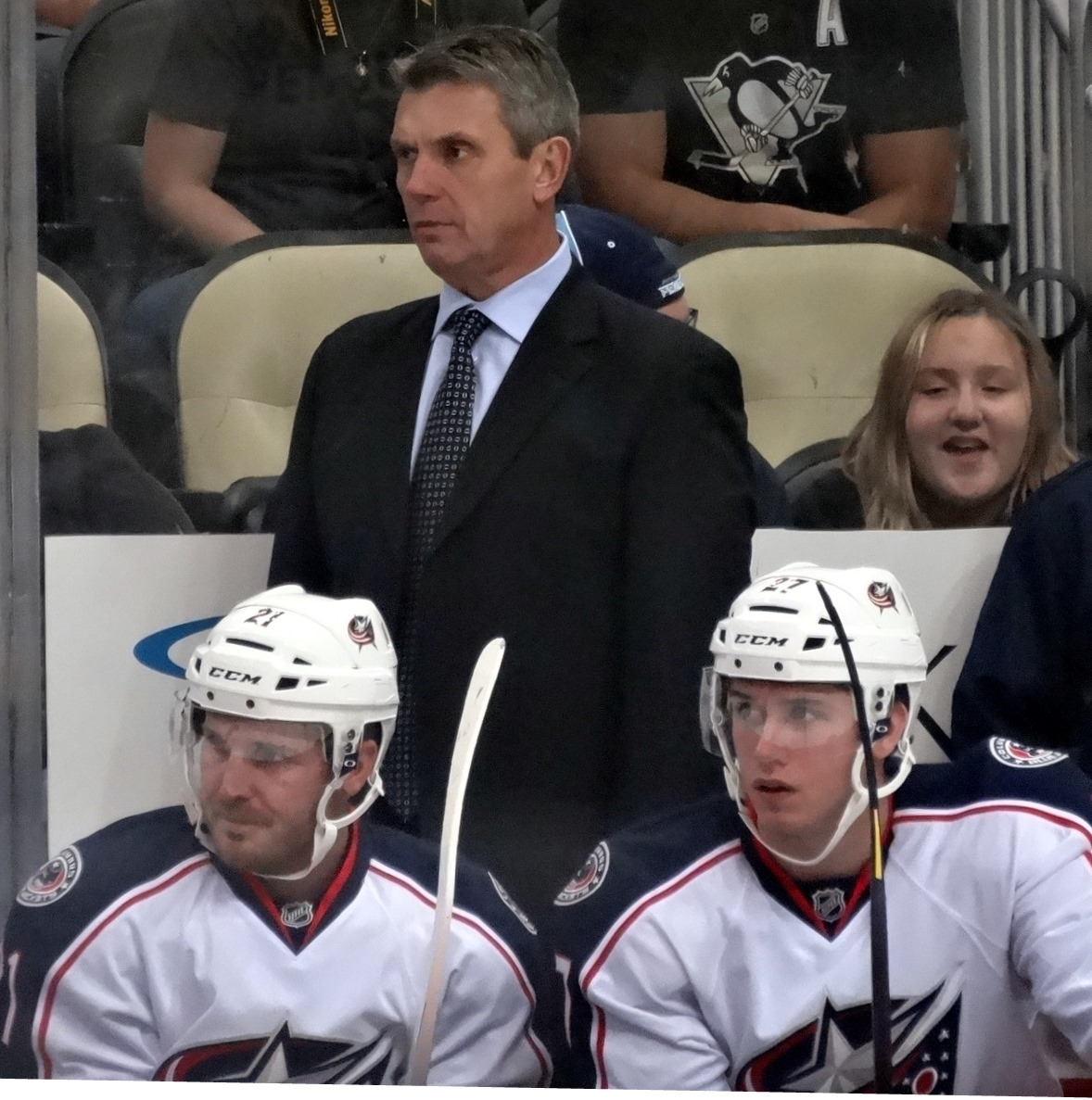
- Born: June 29, 1959 (age 67) Stratford, Ontario, Canada
- Height: 6 ft 1 in (185 cm)
- Weight: 200 lb (91 kg; 14 st 4 lb)
- Position: Defence
- Shot: Left
- Played for: Birmingham Bulls; Minnesota North Stars
- National team: Canada
- NHL draft: 6th overall, 1979; Minnesota North Stars
- Playing career: 1978–1989
Medal record
Representing Canada
Ice hockey
World Championships
Bronze medal – third place	1982 Finland
Bronze medal – third place	1983 West Germany
Canada Cup
Gold medal – first place	1987 Canada

Craig William Hartsburg (born June 29, 1959) is a Canadian former professional ice hockey player and head coach, who currently serves as an amateur scout and defense development coach with the Columbus Blue Jackets of the National Hockey League (NHL). Hartsburg played one season in the World Hockey Association with the Birmingham Bulls and ten seasons with the Minnesota North Stars of the NHL as a defenceman from 1979 until 1989, captaining the team for seven NHL seasons before pursuing a coaching career. He featured in the 1981 Stanley Cup Final with the North Stars.

Hartsburg has coached in the Ontario Hockey League (OHL), the Western Hockey League (WHL), and has previously been an NHL head coach with the Chicago Blackhawks, Mighty Ducks of Anaheim and Ottawa Senators.

== Playing career ==
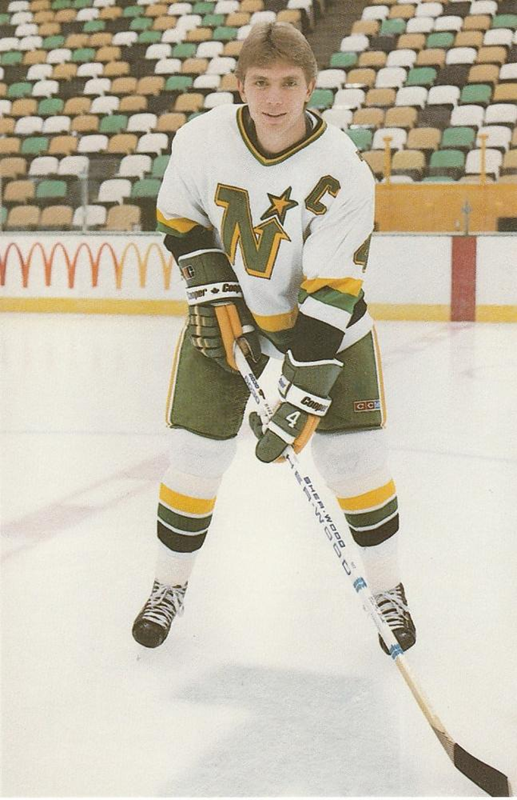
1985 postcard of Hartsburg for Minnesota North Stars

Hartsburg played three seasons of junior hockey for the Sault Ste. Marie Greyhounds, where he was a teammate of Wayne Gretzky's during the 1977–78 season. In Hartsburg's last two seasons with the Greyhounds, he averaged over a point per game. In 1977–78, Hartsburg represented Canada at the World Junior Championships, scoring five points in six games.

Hartsburg skipped his fourth and final junior season, deciding instead to turn pro with the Birmingham Bulls of the World Hockey Association (WHA) in June 1978, as an underage free agent. Hartsburg amassed nine goals and 40 assists in his rookie professional season. With the collapse of the financially troubled WHA in 1979, Hartsburg was drafted sixth overall by the Minnesota North Stars in the 1979 NHL entry draft.

Hartsburg played 570 NHL games, over ten seasons. He scored 98 goals and 315 assists, for 413 points. In 1981–82, his best offensive season, Hartsburg recorded 17 goals and 60 assists for 77 points, with a +11 plus-minus rating. He also finished fourth in Norris Trophy voting. Internationally, he represented Canada at the 1981 and 1987 Canada Cups. At the 1987 IIHF World Championships he was named the tournament's top defenceman. He played in the NHL All-Star game in 1980, 1982, and 1983. Hartsburg's seven seasons as North Stars' captain remained the franchise record for seasons of captaincy until Derian Hatcher broke the record at the end of the 2002-03 NHL season, after the team's move to Dallas.

== Coaching career ==
Following two injury-riddled seasons in which Hartsburg missed 103 of a possible 160 games because of hip problems, Hartsburg retired as a player at age 30 and accepted an assistant coaching position with the North Stars for the 1989–90 season. He then became an assistant coach with the Philadelphia Flyers from 1990 to 1994. He then served as head coach of the Guelph Storm of the Ontario Hockey League (OHL) for the 1994–95 season, before returning to the NHL as the head coach from 1995 to 1998 of the Chicago Blackhawks. In 1998, he was named head coach of the Mighty Ducks of Anaheim before being replaced in midseason of 2000–01.

He coached junior hockey with the Sault Ste. Marie Greyhounds of the OHL for one season, before rejoining the Flyers as an assistant for two seasons. In 2004, he returned to the Greyhounds and served as the head coach until 2008. He also served as coach for the Canadian World Junior Team. He received a gold medal in the 2007 World Junior Ice Hockey Championships, when Team Canada beat Russia 4–2. He was also the coach for Team Canada in the 2008 World Junior Ice Hockey Championships when Canada again won gold by beating Sweden 3–2 in overtime.

On June 13, 2008, he signed a three-year contract and was named head coach of the Ottawa Senators, replacing general manager Bryan Murray who had assumed interim coaching duties when John Paddock was fired on February 27, 2008. On February 1, 2009, Hartsburg was fired by the Senators, having compiled a 17–24–7 record during the 2008–09 season.

On June 23, 2009, the Everett Silvertips of the Western Hockey League named Hartsburg its third head coach in franchise history. On June 6, 2011, Hartsburg stepped down from his coaching job in Everett to join the Calgary Flames as an assistant coach. On June 7, 2012, Hartsburg was released by the Calgary Flames, but was named associate coach of the Columbus Blue Jackets only 13 days later. His time with the Blue Jackets ended on April 13, 2016 when he announced his retirement. On July 12, 2019, he returned to the Blue Jackets as an amateur scout and defense development coach.

== Personal ==
Hartsburg and his wife, Peggy, have two children. Their son, Chris, was the head coach of the OHL's Erie Otters, while their daughter, Katie, is a speech pathologist. He has 3 grandchildren, Colin, Blake and Greyson.

Hartsburg lists Gretzky as the best player he has played with, and Chris Chelios as the best player he has coached. Hartsburg's favorite hobby is fishing.

== Career statistics ==
=== Regular season and playoffs ===
			Regular season					Playoffs
Season	Team	League	GP	G	A	Pts	PIM	GP	G	A	Pts	PIM
1975–76	Sault Ste. Marie Greyhounds	OMJHL	64	9	19	28	65	12	1	0	1	16
1976–77	Sault Ste. Marie Greyhounds	OMJHL	61	29	64	93	142	9	0	11	11	27
1977–78	Sault Ste. Marie Greyhounds	OMJHL	36	15	42	57	101	13	4	8	12	24
1978–79	Birmingham Bulls	WHA	77	9	40	49	73	—	—	—	—	—
1979–80	Minnesota North Stars	NHL	79	14	30	44	81	15	3	1	4	17
1980–81	Minnesota North Stars	NHL	74	13	30	43	124	19	3	12	15	16
1981–82	Minnesota North Stars	NHL	76	17	60	77	117	4	1	2	3	14
1982–83	Minnesota North Stars	NHL	78	12	50	62	109	9	3	8	11	7
1983–84	Minnesota North Stars	NHL	26	7	7	14	37	—	—	—	—	—
1984–85	Minnesota North Stars	NHL	32	7	11	18	54	9	5	3	8	14
1985–86	Minnesota North Stars	NHL	75	10	47	57	127	5	0	1	1	2
1986–87	Minnesota North Stars	NHL	73	11	50	61	93	—	—	—	—	—
1987–88	Minnesota North Stars	NHL	27	3	16	19	29	—	—	—	—	—
1988–89	Minnesota North Stars	NHL	30	4	14	18	47	—	—	—	—	—
WHA totals			77	9	40	49	73	—	—	—	—	—
NHL totals			570	98	315	413	818	61	15	27	42	70

=== International ===
Year	Team	Event	GP	G	A	Pts	PIM
1978	Canada	WJC	6	1	4	5	8
1981	Canada	CC	7	0	1	1	6
1982	Canada	WC	10	3	3	6	12
1983	Canada	WC	5	1	2	3	2
1987	Canada	WC	10	0	1	1	14
1987	Canada	CC	9	0	2	2	6
Junior totals			6	1	4	5	8
Senior totals			41	4	9	13	40

=== NHL ===
Team	Year	Regular season							Postseason		
Team	Year	G	W	L	T	OTL	Pts	Finish	W	L	Result
CHI	1995–96	82	40	28	14	—	94	2nd in Central	6	4	Won in first round (4–0 vs. CGY); Lost in second round (2–4 vs. COL)
CHI	1996–97	82	34	35	13	—	81	5th in Central	2	4	Lost in first round (2–4 vs. COL)
CHI	1997–98	82	30	39	13	—	73	5th in Central	-	-	Missed playoffs
ANA	1998–99	82	35	34	13	—	83	3rd in Pacific	0	4	Lost in first round (0–4 vs. DET)
ANA	1999–2000	82	34	33	12	3	83	5th in Pacific	-	-	Missed playoffs
ANA	2000–01	33	11	15	4	3	(66)	5th in Pacific	-	-	(Fired)
OTT	2008–09	48	17	24	—	7	(83)	4th in Northeast	-	-	(Fired)
CHI Total		246	104	102	40	—	248		8	8	
ANA Total		197	80	82	29	6	195		0	4	
OTT Total		48	17	24	—	7	41		0	0	
Total		491	201	208	69	13	484		8	12	

=== Junior hockey ===
Team	Year	Regular season							Postseason
Team	Year	G	W	L	T	OTL	Pts	Finish	Result
GUE	1994–95	66	47	14	5	—	99	1st in Central	Won in quarterfinals (4-0 vs. OS); Won in semifinals (4–0 vs. BEL); Lost in OHL Finals (2-4 vs. DET)
SOO	2001–02	68	38	20	10	0	86	2nd in West	Lost in first round (3–4 vs. WSR)
SOO	2004–05	59	31	19	8	1	(76)	1st in West	Lost in first round (3–4 vs. WSR)
SOO	2005–06	68	29	31	—	8	66	4th in West	Lost in first round (0–4 vs. LDN)
SOO	2006–07	68	37	23	—	8	82	3rd in West	Won in first round (4–2 vs. SAG); Lost in second round (3–4 vs. LDN)
SOO	2007–08	68	44	18	—	6	94	1st in West	Won in first round (4–0 vs. SAG); Won in second round (4–1 vs. GUE); Lost in third round (1–4 vs. KIT)
EVR	2009–10	72	46	21	3	2	97	3rd in West	Lost in first round (3–4 vs. KEL)
EVR	2010–11	72	28	33	7	4	67	8th in West	Lost in first round (0–4 vs. POR)
SOO Total		331	179	111	18	23	399		22–23 (0.489)
EVR Total		144	74	54	10	6	164		3–8 (0.273)
GUE Total		66	47	14	5	—	99		10–4 (0.714)
OHL Total		397	226	125	23	23	498		32–27 (0.542)
WHL Total		144	74	54	10	6	164		3–8 (0.273)
Junior Total		541	300	179	33	29	662		35–35 (0.500)

Preceded by Bobby Smith	Minnesota North Stars first-round draft pick 1979	Succeeded by Tom McCarthy
Preceded by Tim Young	Minnesota North Stars captain 1982–89; Brian Bellows, 1984	Succeeded by Curt Giles
Preceded by John Lovell	Head coach of the Guelph Storm; 1994–1995	Succeeded by E.J. McGuire
Preceded by Darryl Sutter	Head coach of the Chicago Blackhawks; 1995–98	Succeeded by Dirk Graham
Preceded by Pierre Page	Head coach of the Mighty Ducks of Anaheim; 1998–2000	Succeeded by Guy Charron
Preceded by Paul Theriault	Head coach of the Sault Ste. Marie Greyhounds; 2001–2002	Succeeded by John Vanbiesbrouck
Preceded by Marty Abrams	Head coach of the Sault Ste. Marie Greyhounds; 2004–2008	Succeeded by Denny Lambert
Preceded by Bryan Murray	Head coach of the Ottawa Senators; 2008–2009	Succeeded by Cory Clouston
