= Gord Lane =

Canadian ice hockey player (b. 1953)

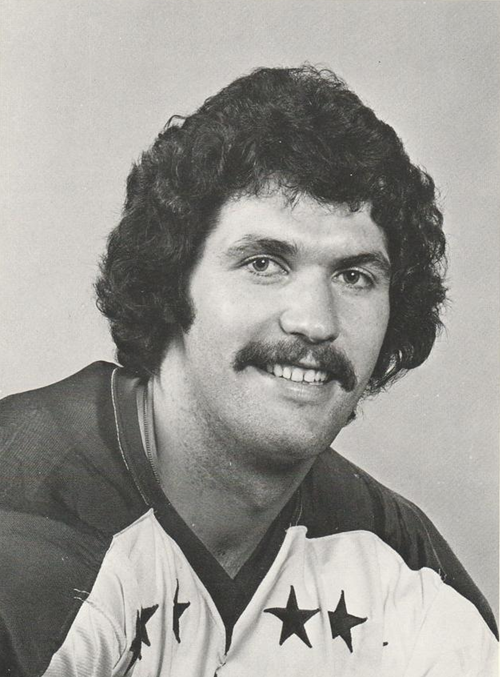
- Born: March 31, 1953 (age 73) Brandon, Manitoba, Canada
- Height: 6 ft 1 in (185 cm)
- Weight: 185 lb (84 kg; 13 st 3 lb)
- Position: Defence
- Shot: Left
- Played for: Washington Capitals; New York Islanders
- NHL draft: 134th overall, 1973; Pittsburgh Penguins
- Playing career: 1973–1987

Gordon Thomas Lawrence Lane (born March 31, 1953) is a Canadian former professional ice hockey player. He played in the National Hockey League for the Washington Capitals and New York Islanders from 1975 to 1986. With the Islanders, Lane won the Stanley Cup four times, from 1980 to 1983.

== Playing career ==
Lane played junior in the WCHL, first with the Brandon Wheat Kings and, after a trade, with the New Westminster Bruins.

Originally selected in the 1973 NHL entry draft by the Pittsburgh Penguins, Lane was signed to a minor league contract with the Fort Wayne Komets. He was subsequently traded to the Dayton Gems, farm team to the Washington Capitals. After winning the Turner Cup with the Dayton Gems, coach Tom McVie and several Gems players were promoted to the Washington Capitals. Signed by the Capitals in 1976, Lane played parts of five seasons, leading the team in penalties in three of those seasons. Unhappy about his playing time with the Caps, he threatened retirement during the 1979–80 season. He was eventually traded to the New York Islanders for forward Mike Kaszycki on December 7, 1979, remaining with that club for the rest of his NHL career.

Lane's first game for the Isles was against the New York Rangers at Madison Square Garden, a 5–4 loss. Lane immediately made his presence known during the game, throwing several hits while also getting involved in several scrums. Lane's tough, defensive abilities did not go unappreciated by Islanders head coach Al Arbour, who, like Lane, was a stay-at-home defenceman during his playing career. Lane helped guide the Islanders steady defence during their four straight Stanley Cup championships (1980, 1981, 1982, and 1983).

Early in the 1984 playoffs, Lane was injured and missed most of the Islanders' playoff run, and the Islanders lost in the Stanley Cup Final to the Edmonton Oilers.

== Career statistics ==
=== Regular season and playoffs ===
| | | | Regular season | | | | | Playoffs |
| Season | Team | League | GP | G | A | Pts | PIM | GP | G | A | Pts | PIM |
|---|---|---|---|---|---|---|---|---|---|---|---|---|
| 1970–71 | Brandon Wheat Kings | WCHL | 20 | 0 | 4 | 4 | 53 | — | — | — | — | — |
| 1971–72 | Brandon Wheat Kings | WCHL | 63 | 7 | 16 | 23 | 106 | 11 | 1 | 2 | 3 | 19 |
| 1972–73 | New Westminster Bruins | WCHL | 36 | 2 | 13 | 15 | 115 | 5 | 0 | 0 | 0 | 29 |
| 1973–74 | Fort Wayne Komets | IHL | 67 | 1 | 14 | 15 | 214 | 4 | 0 | 1 | 1 | 27 |
| 1974–75 | Dayton Gems | IHL | 50 | 6 | 10 | 16 | 225 | 14 | 1 | 3 | 4 | 31 |
| 1975–76 | Washington Capitals | NHL | 3 | 1 | 0 | 1 | 12 | — | — | — | — | — |
| 1975–76 | Hampton Gulls | SHL | 12 | 1 | 7 | 8 | 58 | — | — | — | — | — |
| 1975–76 | Dayton Gems | IHL | 55 | 12 | 22 | 34 | 227 | 15 | 0 | 11 | 11 | 85 |
| 1976–77 | Washington Capitals | NHL | 80 | 2 | 15 | 17 | 207 | — | — | — | — | — |
| 1977–78 | Washington Capitals | NHL | 69 | 2 | 9 | 11 | 195 | — | — | — | — | — |
| 1977–78 | Hershey Bears | AHL | 4 | 0 | 1 | 1 | 8 | — | — | — | — | — |
| 1978–79 | Washington Capitals | NHL | 64 | 3 | 15 | 14 | 147 | — | — | — | — | — |
| 1978–79 | Hershey Bears | AHL | 5 | 0 | 1 | 1 | 48 | — | — | — | — | — |
| 1979–80 | Washington Capitals | NHL | 19 | 2 | 4 | 6 | 53 | — | — | — | — | — |
| 1979–80 | New York Islanders | NHL | 55 | 2 | 14 | 16 | 152 | 21 | 1 | 3 | 4 | 85 |
| 1980–81 | New York Islanders | NHL | 60 | 3 | 9 | 12 | 124 | 12 | 1 | 5 | 6 | 32 |
| 1981–82 | New York Islanders | NHL | 51 | 0 | 13 | 13 | 98 | 19 | 0 | 4 | 4 | 61 |
| 1982–83 | New York Islanders | NHL | 44 | 3 | 4 | 7 | 87 | 18 | 1 | 2 | 3 | 32 |
| 1983–84 | New York Islanders | NHL | 37 | 0 | 3 | 3 | 70 | 4 | 0 | 0 | 0 | 2 |
| 1984–85 | New York Islanders | NHL | 57 | 1 | 8 | 9 | 83 | 1 | 0 | 0 | 0 | 2 |
| 1986–87 | Springfield Indians | AHL | 62 | 2 | 6 | 8 | 117 | — | — | — | — | — |
| NHL totals | | | 539 | 19 | 94 | 113 | 1228 | 75 | 3 | 14 | 17 | 214 |

== Awards and achievements ==
- Turner Cup (IHL) championship (1976)
- Stanley Cup championships (1980, 1981, 1982, and 1983)
- Honoured member of the Manitoba Hockey Hall of Fame
