= Greg Smith (ice hockey) =

Canadian former ice hockey player (born 1955)

- Born: July 18, 1955 (age 70) Ponoka, Alberta, Canada
- Height: 6 ft 0 in (183 cm)
- Weight: 195 lb (88 kg; 13 st 13 lb)
- Position: Defence
- Shot: Left
- Played for: California Seals; Cleveland Barons; Minnesota North Stars; Detroit Red Wings; Washington Capitals
- National team: Canada
- NHL draft: 57th overall, 1975; California Seals
- WHA draft: 94th overall, 1975; Calgary Cowboys
- Playing career: 1976–1988

Gregory James Smith (born July 18, 1955) is a Canadian former ice hockey player. He played for five teams in the National Hockey League between 1976 and 1988. Internationally Smith represented the Canadian national team at the 1977 and 1979 World Championships.

== Career ==
A stay-at-home defenceman who was selected by the California Golden Seals in the 1975 NHL Draft, Smith followed the franchise when it relocated to Cleveland in 1976, and when it folded in 1978 and merged with the Minnesota North Stars, where his rights were protected by the North Stars in the 1978 Cleveland-Minnesota Dispersal Draft. He played for Minnesota for three seasons, and his solid defensive play would help guide them to the finals in 1981.

Smith was traded to the Detroit Red Wings where he played for parts of five seasons until he was traded to the Washington Capitals at the trade deadline of the 1985–86 NHL season. He played for the Capitals until his retirement at the end of the 1987–88 NHL season.

== Retirement ==
Smith spent much of his retirement in Billings, Montana, raising his family and coaching hockey. He has helped several players get into various Junior hockey leagues in both the US and Canada.

== Family life ==
Smith currently resides in Billings, Montana with his wife.

== Career statistics ==
=== Regular season and playoffs ===
			Regular season					Playoffs
Season	Team	League	GP	G	A	Pts	PIM	GP	G	A	Pts	PIM
1972–73	Calgary Canucks	AJHL	—	—	—	—	—	—	—	—	—	—
1973–74	Colorado College	WCHA	31	7	13	20	80	—	—	—	—	—
1974–75	Colorado College	WCHA	36	10	24	34	75	—	—	—	—	—
1975–76	Colorado College	WCHA	34	18	19	37	123	—	—	—	—	—
1975–76	California Golden Seals	NHL	1	0	1	1	2	—	—	—	—	—
1975–76	Salt Lake Golden Eagles	CHL	5	0	2	2	2	5	1	2	3	4
1976–77	Cleveland Barons	NHL	74	9	17	26	65	—	—	—	—	—
1977–78	Cleveland Barons	NHL	80	7	30	37	92	—	—	—	—	—
1978–79	Minnesota North Stars	NHL	80	5	27	32	147	—	—	—	—	—
1979–80	Minnesota North Stars	NHL	55	5	13	18	103	12	0	1	1	9
1980–81	Minnesota North Stars	NHL	74	5	21	26	126	19	1	5	6	39
1981–82	Detroit Red Wings	NHL	69	10	22	32	79	—	—	—	—	—
1982–83	Detroit Red Wings	NHL	73	4	26	30	79	—	—	—	—	—
1983–84	Detroit Red Wings	NHL	75	3	20	23	108	4	1	0	1	8
1984–85	Detroit Red Wings	NHL	73	2	18	20	117	3	0	0	0	7
1985–86	Detroit Red Wings	NHL	62	5	19	24	84	—	—	—	—	—
1985–86	Washington Capitals	NHL	14	0	3	3	10	9	2	1	3	9
1986–87	Washington Capitals	NHL	45	0	9	9	31	7	0	0	0	11
1987–88	Washington Capitals	NHL	54	1	6	7	67	9	0	0	0	23
NHL totals			829	56	232	288	1110	63	4	7	11	106

=== International ===
Year	Team	Event	GP	G	A	Pts	PIM
1977	Canada	WC	10	1	1	2	4
1979	Canada	WC	5	0	0	0	12
Senior totals			15	1	1	2	16
