= Billy Carroll =

Canadian ice hockey player (born 1959)

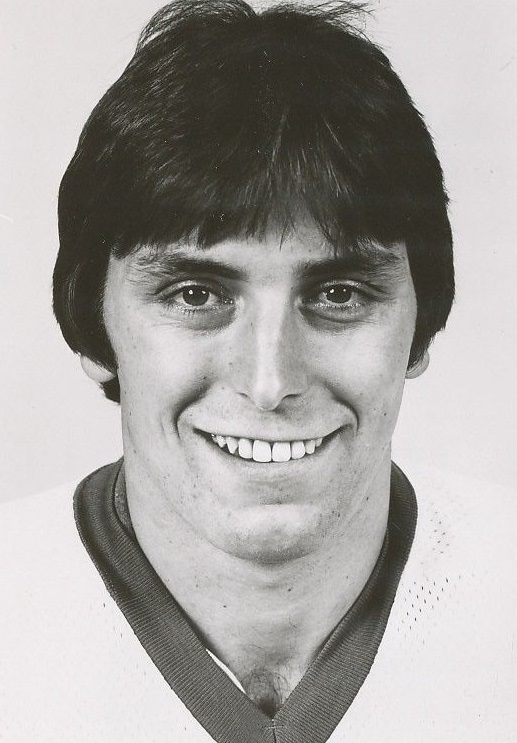
- Carroll in 1981
- Born: January 19, 1959 (age 67) Toronto, Ontario, Canada
- Height: 5 ft 10 in (178 cm)
- Weight: 180 lb (82 kg; 12 st 12 lb)
- Position: Centre
- Shot: Left
- Played for: New York Islanders; Edmonton Oilers; Detroit Red Wings
- NHL draft: 38th overall, 1979; New York Islanders
- Playing career: 1979–1987

William Allan Carroll (born January 19, 1959) is a Canadian former professional ice hockey centre. Carroll played in the National Hockey League (NHL) from 1981 to 1987 for the New York Islanders, Edmonton Oilers and Detroit Red Wings. He won the Stanley Cup four times, from 1981 to 1983 with the Islanders, and in 1985 with the Oilers. Carroll was born in Toronto, Ontario, and grew up in West Rouge on the eastern border of Toronto.

== Playing career ==
Carroll was drafted in the second round (38th overall) by the New York Islanders in the 1979 NHL entry draft from the London Knights of the Ontario Hockey League (OHL). He won the Stanley Cup three times with New York in 1981, 1982, and 1983. He was claimed in the waiver draft by the Edmonton Oilers on October 9, 1984, at the beginning of the 1984-85 NHL season and won the Stanley Cup a fourth time that season at the age of 26. Carroll played two more seasons in the NHL with the Detroit Red Wings before retiring in 1987.

== Personal information ==
He has three sons, in order of birth, Michael and Matthew, who played professional lacrosse for the Toronto Rock of the NLL, while the youngest, Marcus Carroll, played professional ice hockey with the Utah Grizzlies of the ECHL. His two nephews also play hockey: Leo Jenner (born 1989), played major junior hockey in the Ontario Hockey League with the Plymouth Whalers, and played college hockey four seasons while attending Acadia University; and Leo's brother Boone Jenner (born 1993), who was drafted in the 2nd round of the 2011 NHL entry draft by the Columbus Blue Jackets, and is currently serving as the club's team captain.

== Career statistics ==
=== Regular season and playoffs ===
			Regular season					Playoffs
Season	Team	League	GP	G	A	Pts	PIM	GP	G	A	Pts	PIM
1975–76	St. Michael's Buzzers	MetJBHL	32	21	39	60	—	—	—	—	—	—
1976–77	London Knights	OMJHL	64	18	31	49	37	—	—	—	—	—
1977–78	London Knights	OMJHL	68	37	36	73	42	11	3	6	9	6
1978–79	London Knights	OMJHL	63	35	50	85	38	7	1	5	6	14
1979–80	Indianapolis Checkers	CHL	49	9	17	26	19	7	0	1	1	0
1980–81	New York Islanders	NHL	18	4	4	8	6	18	3	9	12	4
1980–81	Indianapolis Checkers	CHL	59	27	37	64	67	—	—	—	—	—
1981–82	New York Islanders	NHL	72	9	20	29	32	19	2	2	4	8
1982–83	New York Islanders	NHL	71	1	11	12	24	20	1	1	2	2
1983–84	New York Islanders	NHL	39	5	2	7	12	5	0	0	0	0
1984–85	Edmonton Oilers	NHL	65	8	9	17	22	9	0	0	0	4
1985–86	Edmonton Oilers	NHL	5	0	2	2	0	—	—	—	—	—
1985–86	Nova Scotia Oilers	AHL	26	7	18	25	15	—	—	—	—	—
1985–86	Detroit Red Wings	NHL	21	2	4	6	11	—	—	—	—	—
1986–87	Detroit Red Wings	NHL	31	1	2	3	6	—	—	—	—	—
NHL totals			322	30	54	84	113	71	6	12	18	18

== Awards and achievements ==
- 1981 - Stanley Cup Champion - New York Islanders
- 1982 - Stanley Cup Champion - New York Islanders
- 1983 - Stanley Cup Champion - New York Islanders
- 1985 - Stanley Cup Champion - Edmonton Oilers
