= Stefan Persson (ice hockey) =

Swedish ice hockey player and executive

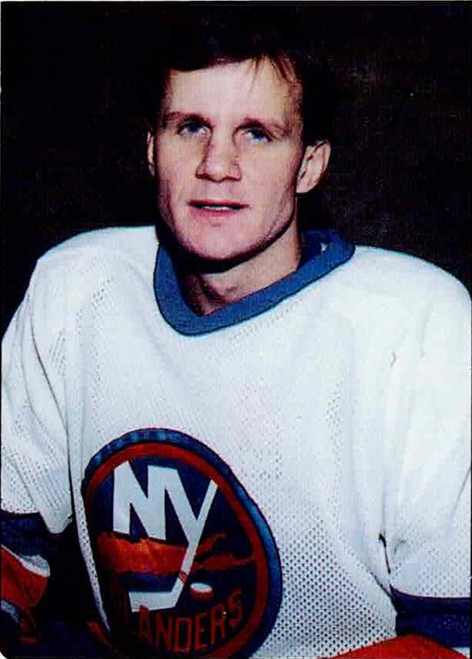
- Born: 22 December 1954 (age 71) Bjurholm, Sweden
- Height: 6 ft 1 in (185 cm)
- Weight: 189 lb (86 kg; 13 st 7 lb)
- Position: Defence
- Shot: Left
- Played for: Piteå IF; Brynäs IF, Gävle; New York Islanders
- NHL draft: 214th overall, 1974; New York Islanders
- Playing career: 1971–1985

Eric Stefan Persson (born 22 December 1954) is a Swedish professional ice hockey executive and former player. He is the general manager of Borås HC hockey club in Sweden. Persson played for nine seasons with the New York Islanders of the National Hockey League (NHL), where he was a member of four Stanley Cup championship teams in 1980, 1981, 1982, and 1983, he was also a two-time Le Mat trophy winner as Swedish hockey champions in 1976, and 1977.

== Playing career ==
Persson made his playing debut as an 18-year-old defenceman with Piteå IF. In 1973 he joined Brynäs. While with Brynäs, he received his first national championship silver medal and two national championship gold medals, in 1976 and 1977. It was during this time that the New York Islanders drafted him, so Persson decided to go overseas to play in the NHL.

Persson's responsible, defensive style was endorsed highly by the Islanders head coach, Al Arbour, and Persson's career in the NHL started swiftly. Persson also showed an adept passing ability and an occasional scoring touch. This was no more apparent than during the Islanders first Stanley Cup playoff run in game one of the 1980 Finals against the Philadelphia Flyers. It was late in the third period, when Persson scored the game-tying goal to force a sudden-death overtime that the Islanders won. Outdoing his regular season output of four goals, Persson scored five goals in the 1980 playoffs, and had serious consideration to become the first Swede to capture the Conn Smythe Trophy, which is awarded for MVP of the Stanley Cup playoffs. Persson was part of the first NHL team (1979–80 New York Islanders) to win a Stanley Cup with Europeans on its roster. The Islanders, with Persson as a regular on their backline, won four consecutive Stanley Cup championships (1980, 1981, 1982, 1983). He also set another record with the Islanders, playing more games than any other Swedish player in the NHL at that time.

During nine seasons with the Islanders, including playoffs, Persson played in 724 games, scored 59 goals and had 367 assists. He sent the four diamond rings he received for the four Stanley Cup wins to his father, Gösta, in the northern city of Piteå, where he had begun his hockey career.

During the late stages of the 1985–86 season, the Islanders management, starting to lose the commitment from its owner to its product, decided that it was no longer prudent to pay Persson's salary, so they traded him to the Winnipeg Jets for a player to be named later. Persson had become a part of the community on Long Island, his only U.S. residence, and was so distraught about the trade that he decided, almost immediately, not to report to Winnipeg, and instead retired from the NHL altogether. Instead, he returned to Sweden and joined Sweden's big-league Borås HC, and was later given an administrative position with the team. After that he was asked to become the national junior team's general manager.

He was inducted into the Piteå Wall of Fame in 2006.

== Career statistics ==
=== Regular season and playoffs ===
			Regular season					Playoffs
Season	Team	League	GP	G	A	Pts	PIM	GP	G	A	Pts	PIM
1970–71	Piteå IF	SWE II	8	0	1	1	—	—	—	—	—	—
1971–72	Piteå IF	SWE II	18	5	1	6	—	—	—	—	—	—
1972–73	Piteå IF	SWE II	16	6	7	13	—	—	—	—	—	—
1973–74	Brynäs IF	SWE	14	1	3	4	8	21	4	3	7	38
1974–75	Brynäs IF	SWE	30	5	7	12	34	6	1	0	1	2
1975–76	Brynäs IF	SEL	34	8	9	17	51	4	0	2	2	10
1976–77	Brynäs IF	SEL	31	5	13	18	70	4	1	0	1	2
1977–78	New York Islanders	NHL	66	6	50	56	54	7	0	2	2	6
1978–79	New York Islanders	NHL	78	10	56	66	57	10	0	4	4	8
1979–80	New York Islanders	NHL	73	4	35	39	76	21	5	10	15	16
1980–81	New York Islanders	NHL	80	9	52	61	82	7	0	5	5	6
1981–82	New York Islanders	NHL	70	6	37	43	99	13	1	14	15	9
1982–83	New York Islanders	NHL	70	4	25	29	71	18	1	5	6	18
1983–84	New York Islanders	NHL	75	9	24	33	65	16	0	6	6	2
1984–85	New York Islanders	NHL	54	3	19	22	30	10	0	4	4	4
1985–86	New York Islanders	NHL	56	1	19	20	40	—	—	—	—	—
1986–87	Borås HC	SWE III	32	5	18	23	—	—	—	—	—	—
1987–88	Borås HC	SWE III	12	3	7	10	—	—	—	—	—	—
1989–90	Borås HC	SWE III	32	7	23	30	125	—	—	—	—	—
SWE totals			44	6	10	16	42	27	5	3	8	40
SEL totals			65	13	22	35	121	8	1	2	3	12
NHL totals			622	52	317	369	574	102	7	50	57	69

=== International ===
Year	Team	Event	GP	G	A	Pts	PIM
1973	Sweden	EJC	5	2	1	3	14
1977	Sweden	WC	10	2	0	2	20
1981	Sweden	CC	5	0	0	0	2
Junior totals			5	2	1	3	14
Senior totals			15	2	0	2	22
