= Čakov (České Budějovice District) =

- Municipality
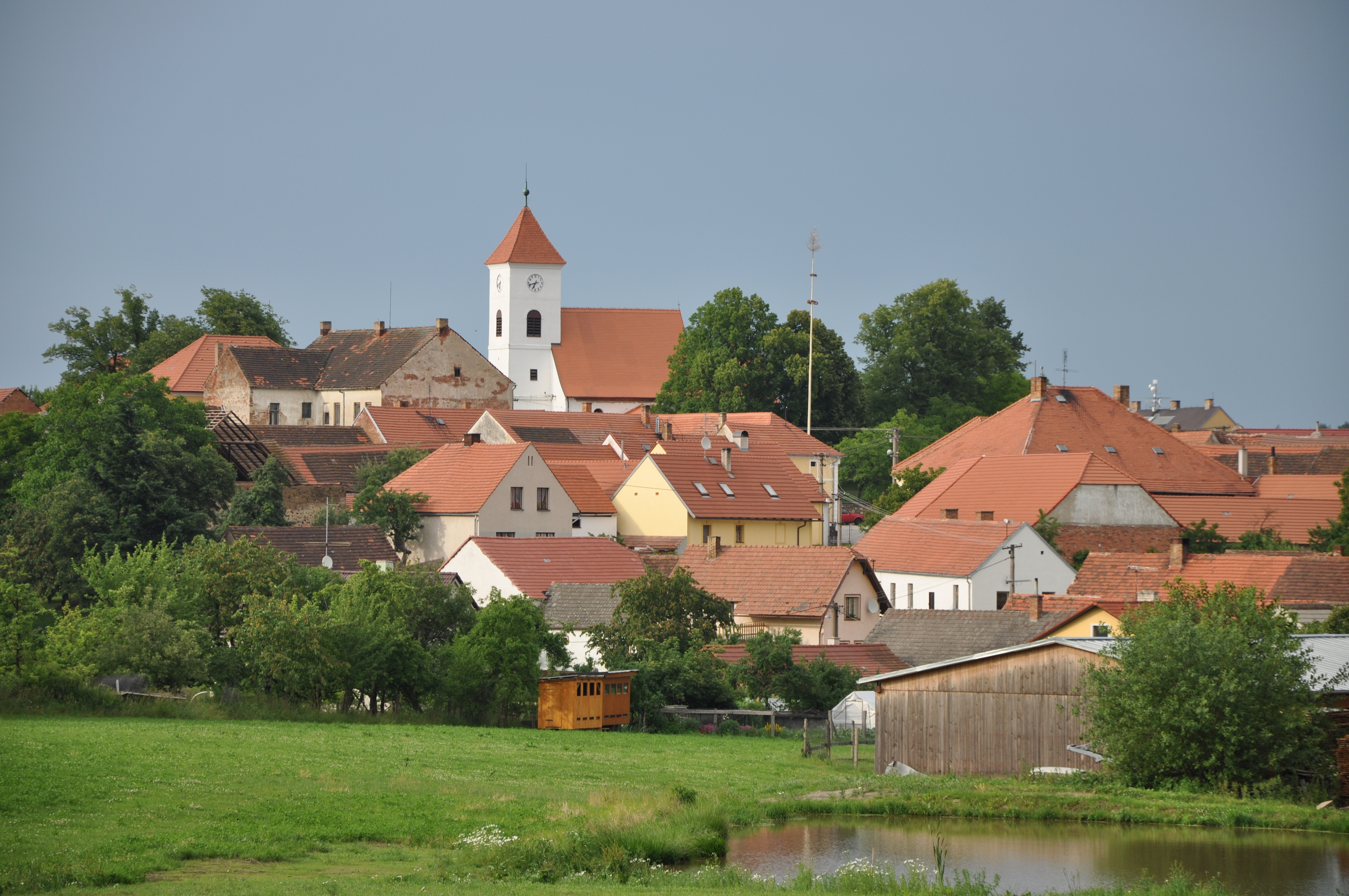
- General view with the Church of Saint Leonard

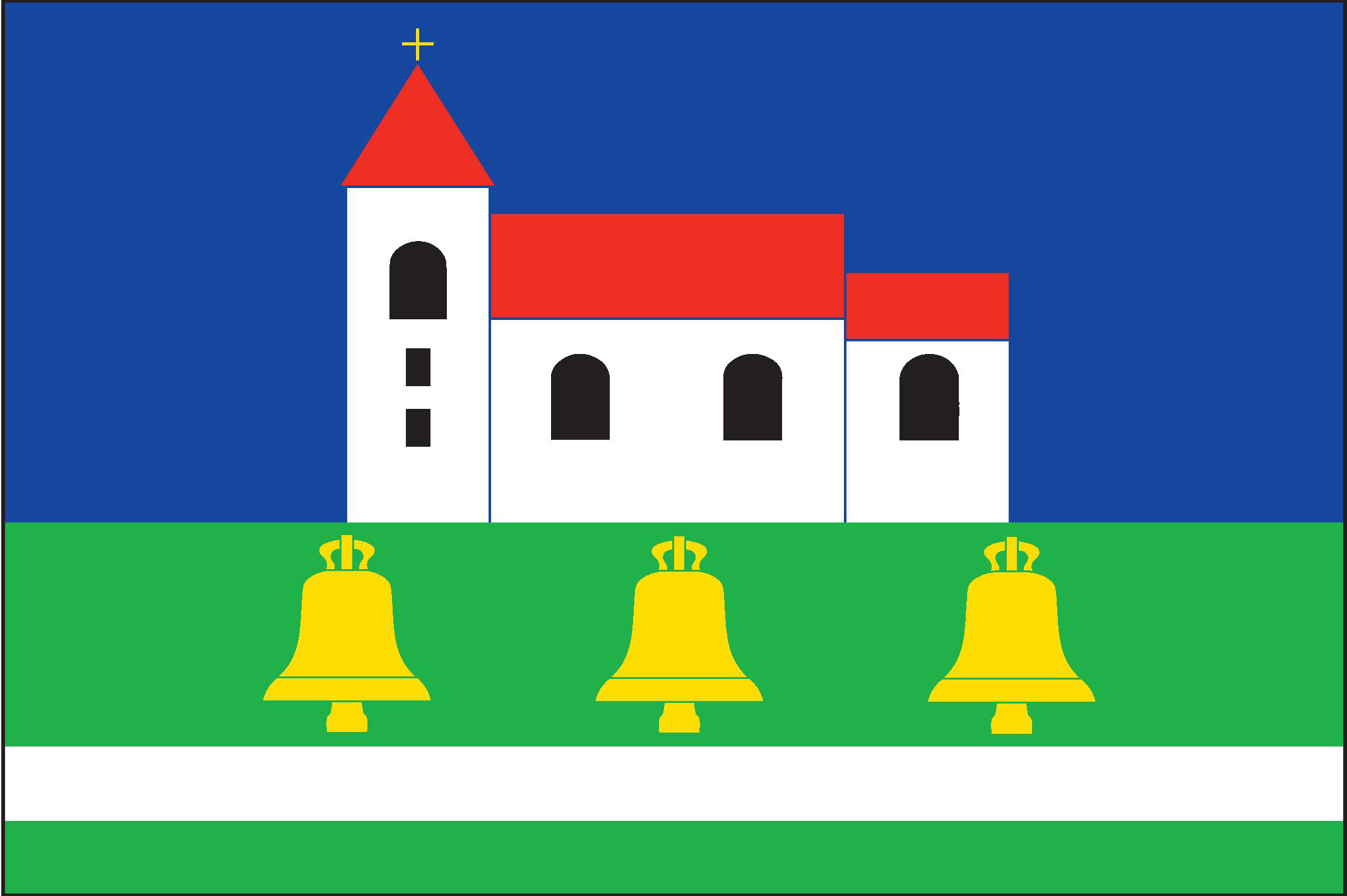
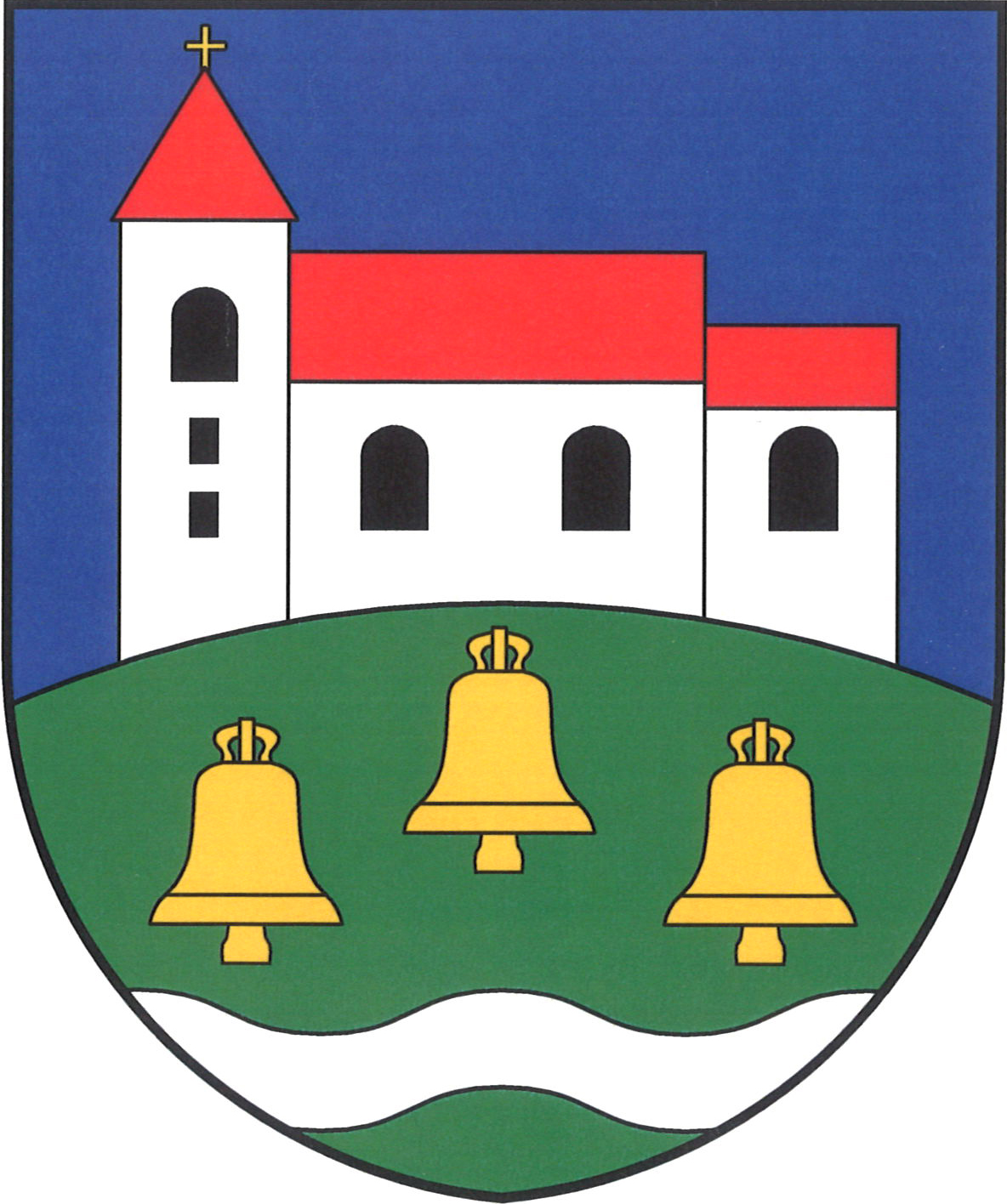
- Flag Coat of arms

- Location in the Czech Republic
- Coordinates: 48°58′50″N 14°18′28″E
- Country: Czech Republic
- Region: South Bohemian
- District: České Budějovice
- First mentioned: 1262

Area
  - Total: 9.02 km^{2} (3.48 sq mi)
- Elevation: 450 m (1,480 ft)

Population (2026-01-01)
  - Total: 303
  - Density: 33.6/km^{2} (87.0/sq mi)
- Time zone: UTC+1 (CET)
  - Summer (DST): UTC+2 (CEST)
- Postal code: 373 84
- Website: www.cakov.cz

Čakov is a municipality and village in České Budějovice District in the South Bohemian Region of the Czech Republic. It has about 300 inhabitants.

== Administrative division ==
Čakov consists of three municipal parts (in brackets population according to the 2021 census):

- Čakov (197)
- Čakovec (66)
- Holubovská Bašta (29)

== Etymology ==
The name Čakov is derived from the surname Čak, meaning "Čak's (court)".

== Geography ==
Čakov is located about 11 kilometres (7 mi) west of České Budějovice. The southwestern part of the municipal territory with the villages of Čakov and Čakovec lies in the Bohemian Forest Foothills and contains the highest point of Čakov at 522 m (1,713 ft) above sea level. The northeastern part with Holubovská Bašta lies in the České Budějovice Basin and is rich in fishponds. The fishpond Dehtář, which is among the largest ponds in the country, is located just outside the municipality and only forms part of the northern municipal border. In the south, the municipality extends into the Blanský les Protected Landscape Area.

== History ==
The first written mention of Čakov is from 1262. The village belonged to the Český Krumlov estate, owned by the Rosenberg family. In 1468, Čakov was acquired by Jindřich Roubík of Hlavatce.

== Demographics ==
Historical population

Year	Pop.	±%
1869	469	—
1880	440	−6.2%
1890	421	−4.3%
1900	435	+3.3%
1910	454	+4.4%

Year	Pop.	±%
1921	431	−5.1%
1930	397	−7.9%
1950	292	−26.4%
1961	283	−3.1%
1970	262	−7.4%

Year	Pop.	±%
1980	228	−13.0%
1991	189	−17.1%
2001	201	+6.3%
2011	274	+36.3%
2021	292	+6.6%

Source: Censuses

== Transport ==
There are no railways or major roads passing through the municipality.

== Sights ==
The main landmark of Čakov is the Church of Saint Leonard. This originally early Gothic church was built around 1300 and was first mentioned in the mid-14th century. The tower was added to the church in the 19th century. The Baroque rectory dates from the late 18th century.

== Notable people ==
- Jaroslav Pouzar (born 1952), ice hockey player
