= Wayne Merrick =

Canadian ice hockey player (born 1952)

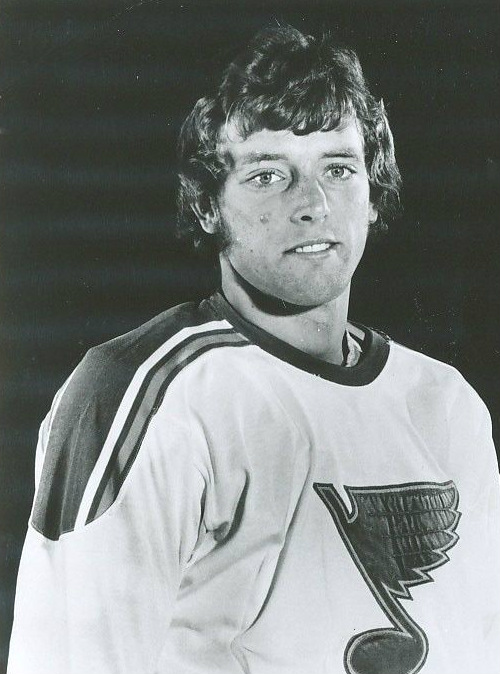
- Born: April 23, 1952 (age 74) Sarnia, Ontario, Canada
- Height: 6 ft 1 in (185 cm)
- Weight: 190 lb (86 kg; 13 st 8 lb)
- Position: Centre
- Shot: Left
- Played for: NHL; St. Louis Blues; California Seals; Cleveland Barons; New York Islanders
- National team: Canada
- NHL draft: 9th overall, 1972; St. Louis Blues
- Playing career: 1972–1984

Leonard Wayne Merrick (born April 23, 1952) is a Canadian former professional ice hockey player who played 774 career National Hockey League games for the St. Louis Blues, California Seals, Cleveland Barons and New York Islanders.

== Playing career ==
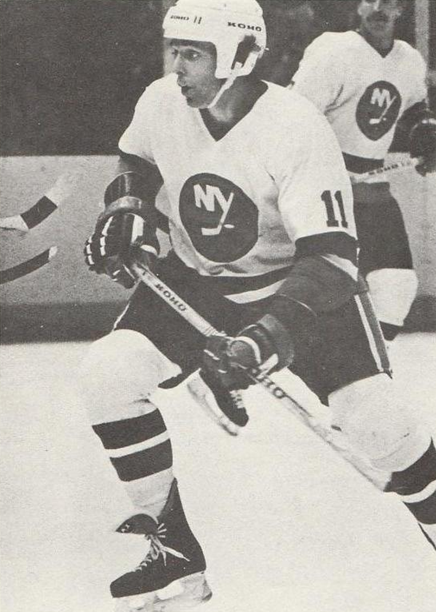
1983 photo of Merrick for New York Islanders

Wayne Merrick helped provide toughness and grit to the talent-laden New York Islanders of the late 1970s and early 1980s, acquired from the Cleveland Barons in exchange for J.P. Parise and Jean Potvin during the 1977–78 season. He played on the famed "Banana Line" centering John Tonelli and Bob Nystrom. He won four Stanley Cups with the Islanders between 1980 and 1983. He scored the Cup-clinching goal in game five of the 1981 Stanley Cup Final.

== Career statistics ==
=== Regular season and playoffs ===
			Regular season					Playoffs
Season	Team	League	GP	G	A	Pts	PIM	GP	G	A	Pts	PIM
1969–70	Ottawa 67's	OHA-Jr.	51	10	17	27	10	5	0	2	2	0
1970–71	Ottawa 67's	OHA-Jr.	62	34	42	76	41	11	6	8	14	4
1971–72	Ottawa 67's	OHA-Jr.	62	39	56	95	21	18	13	6	19	0
1972–73	St. Louis Blues	NHL	50	10	11	21	10	5	0	1	1	2
1972–73	Denver Spurs	WHL	22	6	13	19	6	—	—	—	—	—
1973–74	St. Louis Blues	NHL	64	20	23	43	32	—	—	—	—	—
1974–75	St. Louis Blues	NHL	76	28	37	65	57	2	1	1	2	0
1975–76	St. Louis Blues	NHL	19	7	8	15	0	—	—	—	—	—
1975–76	California Golden Seals	NHL	56	25	27	52	36	—	—	—	—	—
1976–77	Cleveland Barons	NHL	80	18	38	56	25	—	—	—	—	—
1977–78	Cleveland Barons	NHL	18	2	5	7	8	—	—	—	—	—
1977–78	New York Islanders	NHL	37	10	14	24	8	7	1	0	1	0
1978–79	New York Islanders	NHL	75	20	21	41	24	10	2	3	5	2
1979–80	New York Islanders	NHL	70	13	22	35	16	21	2	4	6	2
1980–81	New York Islanders	NHL	71	16	15	31	30	18	6	12	18	8
1981–82	New York Islanders	NHL	68	12	27	39	20	19	6	6	12	6
1982–83	New York Islanders	NHL	59	4	12	16	27	19	1	3	4	10
1983–84	New York Islanders	NHL	31	6	5	11	10	1	0	0	0	0
NHL totals			774	191	265	456	303	102	19	30	49	30

=== International ===
Year	Team	Event	GP	G	A	Pts	PIM
1977	Canada	WC	10	4	3	7	10

Awards and achievements
Preceded by Gene Carr	St. Louis Blues first-round draft pick 1972	Succeeded by John Davidson
