= Anders Kallur =

Swedish ice hockey player

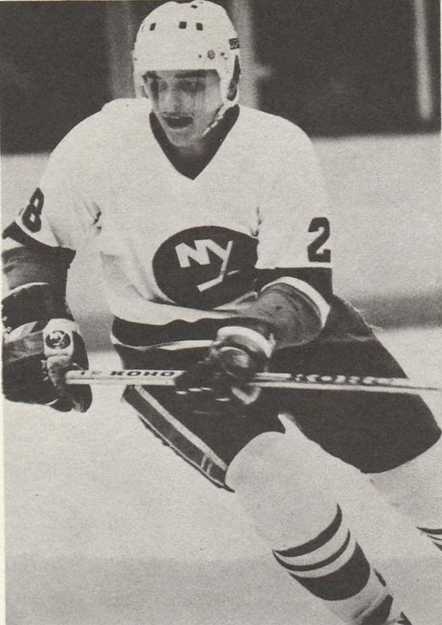
- Kallur with the New York Islanders in 1983
- Born: 6 July 1952 (age 74) Ludvika, Sweden
- Height: 5 ft 11 in (180 cm)
- Weight: 185 lb (84 kg; 13 st 3 lb)
- Position: Right wing
- Shot: Left
- Played for: Falu IF; HC Tunabro; Modo AIK; Södertälje Sportsklubb; Djurgårdens IF Hockey; New York Islanders
- NHL draft: Undrafted
- Playing career: 1970–1985

Anders Kallur (born 6 July 1952) is a Swedish former professional ice hockey player. He was a four-time Stanley Cup winner with the New York Islanders.

Kallur played for Modo Hockey and Södertälje SK before moving to Djurgårdens IF in 1978. He was awarded Guldpucken as the best player of the 1978–79 season. He was signed by New York Islanders in 1979 and played his entire North American career with that team (except for two games with Indianapolis Checkers).

Together with fellow Swede Stefan Persson, Kallur was part of the first NHL team (1979-80 New York Islanders) to win a Stanley Cup with European-trained players on its roster. Scottish-born Dunc Munro of the Montreal Maroons was the first European-born player to win the Stanley Cup. Kallur played with the Islanders during all four of their Stanley Cup championships from 1980 to 1983. He is currently a scout in the New York Rangers organization focusing on European prospects.

Anders Kallur is the father of Swedish athletes Jenny, Martin and Susanna Kallur.

== Career statistics ==
=== Regular season and playoffs ===
			Regular season					Playoffs
Season	Team	League	GP	G	A	Pts	PIM	GP	G	A	Pts	PIM
1970–71	Falu IF	SWE II	18	6	—	—	—	—	—	—	—	—
1971–72	Falu IF	SWE II	18	15	—	—	—	—	—	—	—	—
1972–73	HC Tunabro	SWE	14	3	3	6	4	6	3	1	4	0
1973–74	HC Tunabro	SWE	14	5	3	8	4	13	8	7	15	22
1974–75	Modo AIK	SWE	30	30	16	46	26	—	—	—	—	—
1975–76	Modo AIK	SEL	36	11	16	27	33	—	—	—	—	—
1976–77	Södertälje SK	SEL	31	14	9	23	26	—	—	—	—	—
1977–78	Södertälje SK	SEL	30	5	7	12	10	—	—	—	—	—
1978–79	Djurgårdens IF	SEL	36	25	21	46	32	4	3	3	6	2
1979–80	New York Islanders	NHL	76	22	30	52	16	—	—	—	—	—
1979–80	Indianapolis Checkers	CHL	2	0	2	2	0	—	—	—	—	—
1980–81	New York Islanders	NHL	78	36	28	64	32	12	4	3	7	10
1981–82	New York Islanders	NHL	58	18	22	40	18	19	1	6	7	8
1982–83	New York Islanders	NHL	55	6	8	14	33	20	3	12	15	12
1983–84	New York Islanders	NHL	65	9	14	23	24	17	2	2	4	2
1984–85	New York Islanders	NHL	51	10	8	18	26	10	2	0	2	0
SWE totals			58	38	22	60	34	19	11	8	19	22
SEL totals			133	55	53	108	101	4	3	3	6	2
NHL totals			383	101	110	211	149	78	12	23	35	32

=== International ===
Year	Team	Event	GP	G	A	Pts	PIM
1981	Sweden	CC	5	3	1	4	0

Preceded by Rolf Edberg	Guldpucken; 1979	Succeeded by Mats Näslund
