= Åkers styckebruk =

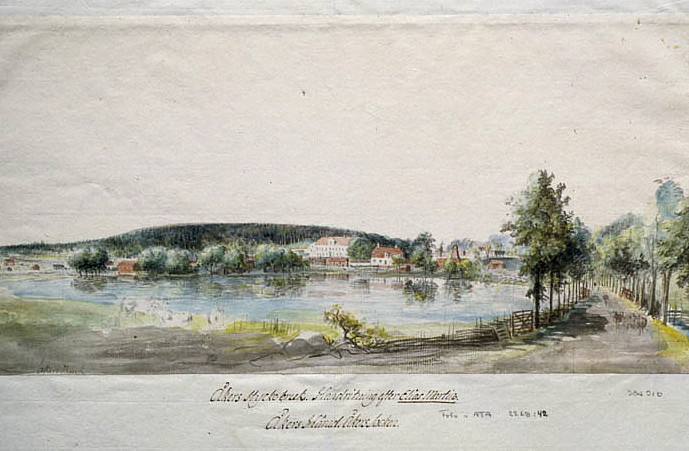

- Flag Coat of arms

- Location within Södermanland Location within Sweden
- Coordinates: 59°15′N 17°05′E
- Country: Sweden
- Province: Södermanland
- County: Södermanland County
- Municipality: Strängnäs Municipality

Area
  - Total: 3.03 km^{2} (1.17 sq mi)

Population (31 December 2010)
  - Total: 2,891
  - Density: 955/km^{2} (2,470/sq mi)
- Time zone: UTC+1 (CET)
  - Summer (DST): UTC+2 (CEST)

Åkers styckebruk is a locality situated in Strängnäs Municipality, Södermanland County, Sweden with 2,891 inhabitants in 2010.

== Riksdag elections ==
With a strong industrial heritage and being a left-wing stronghold as late as the early 21st century, Åkers styckebruk then saw a rapid transformation towards the right in the following elections, becoming more electorally similar to the rest of the historically right-leaning Strängnäs Municipality.

Year	%	Votes	V	S	MP	C	L	KD	M	SD	NyD	Left	Right
1973	94.5	1,868	3.9	66.3		15.7	7.1	0.4	6.2			70.2	28.9
1976	94.2	1,922	2.8	65.7		14.8	8.5	0.4	7.2			68.5	30.5
1979	92.7	1,969	4.1	64.7		11.6	9.2	0.3	9.6			68.8	30.5
1982	93.1	2,029	4.6	66.3	0.8	9.4	4.8	0.8	13.1			71.0	27.3
1985	92.0	2,063	3.9	65.0	0.7	4.9	12.2		13.0			68.9	30.2
1988	87.3	1,961	6.3	62.9	3.2	5.0	11.3	1.0	10.0			72.4	26.3
1991	87.0	2,020	4.2	55.3	2.4	4.1	8.3	3.6	13.3		8.5	59.5	29.3
1994	87.4	2,110	7.4	61.9	3.6	3.7	5.4	1.7	14.6		1.1	73.0	25.5
1998	81.0	1,914	13.7	51.8	2.9	2.4	3.6	7.1	17.0			68.4	30.0
2002	79.4	1,987	8.2	54.5	2.8	3.5	10.4	9.2	12.5	0.6		65.4	33.1
2006	81.4	2,011	4.2	48.2	4.4	5.2	4.7	6.2	21.4	3.6		56.8	38.0
2010	82.3	2,162	5.2	38.1	6.1	4.8	5.2	3.4	26.7	9.7		49.4	40.2
2014	81.3	2,170	5.8	37.4	5.1	3.8	3.0	2.4	21.2	19.4		48.3	30.5
2018	82.4	2,164	6.6	30.9	1.6	5.7	3.1	4.6	18.4	27.6		44.8	53.7
