= Dave Langevin =

American ice hockey player

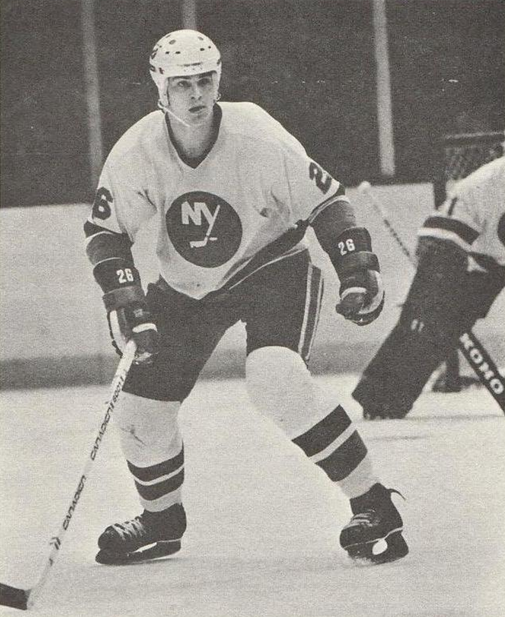
- Born: May 15, 1954 (age 71) Saint Paul, Minnesota, U.S.
- Height: 6 ft 2 in (188 cm)
- Weight: 215 lb (98 kg; 15 st 5 lb)
- Position: Defense
- Shot: Left
- Played for: Edmonton Oilers; New York Islanders; Minnesota North Stars; Los Angeles Kings
- National team: United States
- NHL draft: 112th overall, 1974; New York Islanders
- WHA draft: 67th overall, 1974; Edmonton Oilers
- Playing career: 1976–1987

David Richard Langevin (born May 15, 1954) is an American former professional ice hockey defenseman who played 216 games for the Edmonton Oilers in the World Hockey Association (WHA) as well as 513 games in the National Hockey League (NHL) for the New York Islanders, Minnesota North Stars and Los Angeles Kings between 1977 and 1987. He is a member of the United States Hockey Hall of Fame.

== Amateur career ==
Langevin played for the University of Minnesota Duluth ice hockey team in 1972–76. He was also a member of the US national team at the 1976 Ice Hockey World Championship tournament in Katowice.

== Professional career ==
Drafted 112th overall by the NY Islanders in the 1974 NHL entry draft, Langevin instead chose to sign with the Edmonton Oilers of the rival World Hockey Association, who also had selected him in the WHA draft the same year, since his prospects of getting regular playing time were better in the WHA. Langevin became a solid performer for the Oilers, making the All-WHA Second All-Star team in 1978–79. When the Oilers joined the NHL the following season, the Islanders reclaimed him as a former New York draft pick.

Langevin started his National Hockey League career with the New York Islanders, winning four consecutive Stanley Cups. He also played with the Minnesota North Stars and Los Angeles Kings. His NHL career lasted from 1979 to 1987. Langevin played in the 1983 NHL All-Star Game and he was a member of the United States team at the 1981 Canada Cup.

Langevin was a strictly defensive defenseman, whose forte was full-body checking. Langevin was instrumental in the Islanders' come-back victory in the 1985 playoffs against the Washington Capitals. Benched for the first two losses, he entered game three with a decisive physical presence, most notably checking sniper Mike Gartner with a powerful hip check. The Islanders went on to win three straight and became the only team ever to lose the first two games of a five-game series and go on to win.

== Post Playing Career ==
Langevin served as head coach of the expansion Idaho Steelheads of the West Coast Hockey League (WCHL) during the 1997–98 season. After a single season in Idaho, he returned to Minnesota and became a real estate appraiser and high school hockey coach. He also served as a South Suburban (MnJHL) head coach until the team folded following the 2001–02 season. He has also done part-time work for the NHL Central Scouting Bureau after his retirement.

Langevin, who wore #26 for the Islanders, was inducted into the United States Hockey Hall of Fame in 1993.

== Awards and honors ==
Award	Year
All-WCHA Second Team	1975–76

- WHA Second All-Star Team (1979)
- Played in the NHL All-Star Game (1983)
- Stanley Cup Champions (1980, 1981, 1982, 1983)

== Career statistics ==
=== Regular season and playoffs ===
			Regular season					Playoffs
Season	Team	League	GP	G	A	Pts	PIM	GP	G	A	Pts	PIM
1969–70	Hill-Murray School	HS-MN	—	—	—	—	—	—	—	—	—	—
1970–71	Hill-Murray School	HS-MN	—	—	—	—	—	—	—	—	—	—
1971–72	Hill-Murray School	HS-MN	—	—	—	—	—	—	—	—	—	—
1972–73	University of Minnesota-Duluth	WCHA	36	6	11	17	74	—	—	—	—	—
1973–74	University of Minnesota-Duluth	WCHA	37	2	11	13	56	—	—	—	—	—
1974–75	University of Minnesota-Duluth	WCHA	35	8	24	32	91	—	—	—	—	—
1975–76	University of Minnesota-Duluth	WCHA	34	19	26	45	82	—	—	—	—	—
1976–77	Edmonton Oilers	WHA	77	7	16	23	94	5	2	1	3	9
1977–78	Edmonton Oilers	WHA	62	6	22	28	90	5	0	2	2	10
1978–79	Edmonton Oilers	WHA	77	6	21	27	76	13	0	1	1	25
1979–80	New York Islanders	NHL	76	3	13	16	109	21	0	3	3	32
1980–81	New York Islanders	NHL	75	1	16	17	122	18	0	3	3	25
1981–82	New York Islanders	NHL	73	1	20	21	82	19	2	4	6	16
1982–83	New York Islanders	NHL	73	4	17	21	64	8	0	2	2	2
1983–84	New York Islanders	NHL	69	3	16	19	53	12	0	4	4	18
1984–85	New York Islanders	NHL	56	0	13	13	35	4	0	0	0	4
1985–86	Minnesota North Stars	NHL	80	0	8	8	58	5	0	1	1	9
1986–87	Los Angeles Kings	NHL	11	0	4	4	7	—	—	—	—	—
1986–87	New Haven Nighthawks	AHL	10	1	1	2	7	—	—	—	—	—
WHA totals			216	19	59	78	260	23	2	4	6	44
NHL totals			513	12	107	119	530	87	2	17	19	106

=== International ===
Year	Team	Event	GP	G	A	Pts	PIM
1976	United States	WC	10	1	0	1	11
1981	United States	CC	6	0	1	1	8
Senior totals			16	1	1	2	19
