= 1980 Stanley Cup playoffs =

Hockey playoffs in 1980

Tournament details
- Dates: April 8–May 24, 1980
- Teams: 16
- Defending champions: Montreal Canadiens

Final positions
- Champions: New York Islanders
- Runners-up: Philadelphia Flyers

Tournament statistics
- Scoring leader(s): Bryan Trottier (Islanders) (29 points)

Awards
- MVP: Bryan Trottier (Islanders)

The 1980 Stanley Cup playoffs, the playoff tournament of the National Hockey League (NHL) began on April 8, after the conclusion of the 1979–80 NHL season. This season saw the addition of four teams from the disbanded World Hockey Association (WHA) as expansion franchises, and thus the playoffs were also expanded from 12 to 16 teams. The expanded playoff format allowed two of those former WHA clubs, the Edmonton Oilers and the Hartford Whalers, to make the playoffs in their first season in the NHL. The Atlanta Flames played their final playoff games before moving to Calgary after the season; the playoffs would eventually return to Atlanta in 2007 when the expansion Atlanta Thrashers made their first postseason appearance.

The playoffs concluded on May 24 when the New York Islanders defeated the Philadelphia Flyers 5–4 to win the final series four games to two and win the Stanley Cup. It was the Islanders' first Stanley Cup win and was the first of four consecutive Stanley Cup wins.

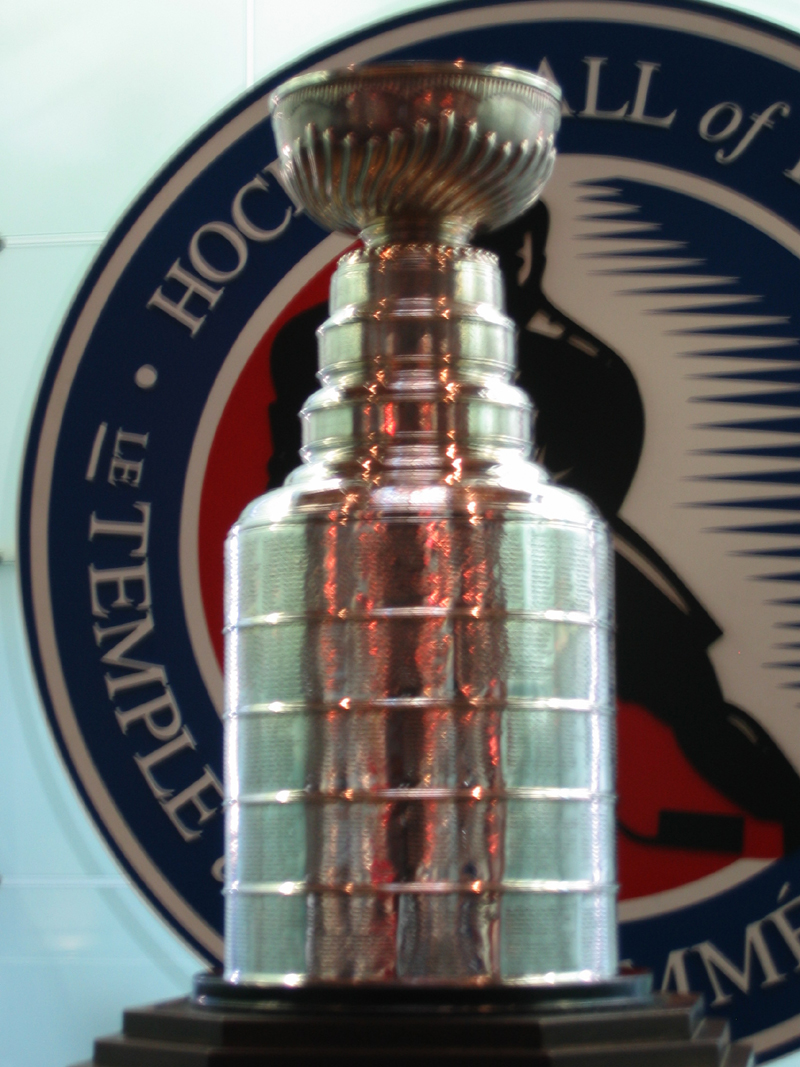
The Stanley Cup

== Playoff seeds ==
With the league expansion from 17 to 21 teams, the playoffs were also expanded, from a 12-team tournament to a 16-team tournament. The sixteen teams were composed of the four divisional champions plus the top 12 finishers of the remaining 17 teams. The 16 qualifying teams were then seeded based on regular season points, with divisional rankings ignored. Division leaders no longer received first round byes. The teams were seeded 1 through 16, with the top team playing the 16th team in the first round, and so on. In subsequent rounds, matchups were similarly arranged, with the top remaining seed against the lowest remaining seed, and so on.

The following sixteen teams qualified for the playoffs:

1. Philadelphia Flyers, Patrick Division champions, Clarence Campbell Conference regular season champions, NHL regular season champions – 116 points
2. Buffalo Sabres, Adams Division champions, Prince of Wales Conference regular season champions – 110 points
3. Montreal Canadiens, Norris Division champions – 107 points
4. Boston Bruins – 105 points
5. New York Islanders – 91 points
6. Minnesota North Stars – 88 points
7. Chicago Black Hawks, Smythe Division champions – 87 points
8. New York Rangers – 86 points
9. Atlanta Flames – 83 points
10. St. Louis Blues – 80 points
11. Toronto Maple Leafs – 75 points
12. Los Angeles Kings – 74 points
13. Pittsburgh Penguins – 73 points (30 wins)
14. Hartford Whalers – 73 points (27 wins)
15. Vancouver Canucks – 70 points
16. Edmonton Oilers – 69 points

== Playoff bracket ==
The NHL used "re-seeding" instead of a fixed bracket playoff system: in each round, the highest remaining seed was matched against the lowest remaining seed, the second-highest remaining seed played the second-lowest remaining seed, and so forth.

Starting this postseason, each series in the Preliminary Round was expanded from a best-of-three format to a best-of-five format. Each series in the other three rounds remained in a best-of-seven format.

Preliminary Round
1	Philadelphia	3
16	Edmonton	0
2	Buffalo	3
15	Vancouver	1
3	Montreal	3
14	Hartford	0
4	Boston	3
13	Pittsburgh	2
5	NY Islanders	3
12	Los Angeles	1
6	Minnesota	3
11	Toronto	0
7	Chicago	3
10	St. Louis	0
8	NY Rangers	3
9	Atlanta	1

Quarterfinals
1	Philadelphia	4
8	NY Rangers	1
2	Buffalo	4
7	Chicago	0
3	Montreal	3
6	Minnesota	4
4	Boston	1
5	NY Islanders	4

Semifinals
1	Philadelphia	4
4	Minnesota	1
2	Buffalo	2
3	NY Islanders	4

Stanley Cup Finals
1	Philadelphia	2
3	NY Islanders	4

== Preliminary round ==
=== (1) Philadelphia Flyers vs. (16) Edmonton Oilers ===
This was the first playoff series meeting between these two teams.

April 8	Edmonton Oilers	3–4	OT	Philadelphia Flyers	Spectrum	Recap
Dave Lumley (1) – pp – 14:09; Wayne Gretzky (1) – 16:01		First period		00:56 – Paul Holmgren (1); 06:19 – Reggie Leach (1)
No scoring		Second period		No scoring
Don Murdoch (1) – 08:09		Third period		18:41 – Rick MacLeish (1)
No scoring		First overtime period		08:06 – Bobby Clarke (1)
Ron Low 47 saves / 51 shots		Goalie stats		Pete Peeters 14 saves / 17 shots

April 9	Edmonton Oilers	1–5	Philadelphia Flyers	Spectrum	Recap
Don Murdoch (2) – 01:14		First period	13:32 – Behn Wilson (1)
No scoring		Second period	04:08 – pp – Bobby Clarke (2)
No scoring		Third period	08:26 – Paul Holmgren (2); 10:05 – Reggie Leach (2); 19:33 – pp – Tom Gorence (1)
Ron Low 23 saves / 28 shots		Goalie stats	Pete Peeters 23 saves / 24 shots

April 11	Philadelphia Flyers	3–2	2OT	Edmonton Oilers	Northlands Coliseum	Recap
No scoring		First period		15:55 – Wayne Gretzky (2); 17:16 – sh – Mark Messier (1)
Behn Wilson (2) – 04:24		Second period		No scoring
Brian Propp (1) – 07:03		Third period		No scoring
Ken Linseman (1) – 03:56		Second overtime period		No scoring
Phil Myre 41 saves / 43 shots		Goalie stats		Ron Low 45 saves / 48 shots

Philadelphia won series 3–0

=== (2) Buffalo Sabres vs. (15) Vancouver Canucks ===
This was the first playoff series meeting between these two teams.

April 8	Vancouver Canucks	1–2	Buffalo Sabres	Buffalo Memorial Auditorium	Recap
No scoring		First period	04:20 – pp – Derek Smith (1)
No scoring		Second period	13:21 – Don Luce (1)
Brent Ashton (1) – 16:42		Third period	No scoring
Gary Bromley 24 saves / 26 shots		Goalie stats	Don Edwards 18 saves / 19 shots

April 9	Vancouver Canucks	0–6	Buffalo Sabres	Buffalo Memorial Auditorium	Recap
No scoring		First period	03:31 – pp – Mike Ramsey (1); 09:51 – Rick Martin (1); 16:54 – pp – Gilbert Perreault (1); 19:59 – pp – Richie Dunn (1)
No scoring		Second period	06:05 – Ric Seiling (1); 16:31 – Rick Martin (2)
No scoring		Third period	No scoring
Gary Bromley 6 saves / 10 shots Glen Hanlon 14 saves / 16 shots		Goalie stats	Bob Sauve 22 saves / 22 shots

April 11	Buffalo Sabres	4–5	Vancouver Canucks	Pacific Coliseum	Recap
Danny Gare (1) – pp – 15:29		First period	04:41 – Bob Manno (1); 07:06 – Gary Lupul (1); 16:17 – Darcy Rota (1); 19:50 – Kevin McCarthy (1)
Derek Smith (2) – 02:08		Second period	No scoring
Tony McKegney (1) – 17:46; Rick Martin (3) – 18:48		Third period	03:38 – Per-Olov Brasar (1)
Don Edwards 21 saves / 26 shots		Goalie stats	Gary Bromley 19 saves / 22 shots Glen Hanlon 10 saves / 11 shots

April 12	Buffalo Sabres	3–1	Vancouver Canucks	Pacific Coliseum	Recap
Rick Martin (4) – pp – 15:24		First period	No scoring
No scoring		Second period	04:42 – Darcy Rota (2)
Gilbert Perreault (2) – 02:04; Ric Seiling (2) – en – 19:41		Third period	No scoring
Bob Sauve 23 saves / 24 shots		Goalie stats	Gary Bromley 24 saves / 26 shots

Buffalo won series 3–1

=== (3) Montreal Canadiens vs. (14) Hartford Whalers ===
This was the first playoff series meeting between these two teams. Game 3 was the last game each for Gordie Howe and Bobby Hull, who each retired in the offseason.

April 8	Hartford Whalers	1–6	Montreal Canadiens	Forum de Montréal	Recap
No scoring		First period	05:50 – Yvon Lambert (1); 15:52 – Brian Engblom (1)
No scoring		Second period	11:59 – Rick Chartraw (1); 13:59 – Guy Lafleur (1)
Mark Howe (1) – 15:01		Third period	10:27 – Yvon Lambert (2); 13:15 – pp – Steve Shutt (1)
Al Smith 31 saves / 37 shots		Goalie stats	Denis Herron 20 saves / 21 shots

April 9	Hartford Whalers	4–8	Montreal Canadiens	Forum de Montréal	Recap
No scoring		First period	00:30 – Doug Jarvis (1); 01:20 – Rejean Houle (1); 16:32 – Yvon Lambert (3)
Ray Neufeld (1) – 06:22; Gordie Roberts (1) – 11:26		Second period	01:33 – Gaston Gingras (1); 06:46 – Bob Gainey (1); 12:45 – Yvon Lambert (4); 13:53 – Steve Shutt (2); 19:49 – Guy Lafleur (2)
Marty Howe (1) – 05:55; Gordie Howe (1) – 13:59		Third period	No scoring
John Garrett 32 saves / 40 shots		Goalie stats	Denis Herron 23 saves / 27 shots

April 11	Montreal Canadiens	4–3	OT	Hartford Whalers	Hartford Civic Center	Recap
Guy Lafleur (3) – 12:17		First period		07:03 – sh – Pat Boutette (1)
Yvon Lambert (5) – pp – 05:03		Second period		01:27 – Tom Rowe (1)
Rejean Houle (2) – 02:58		Third period		08:04 – Tom Rowe (2)
Yvon Lambert (6) – 00:29		First overtime period		No scoring
Michel Larocque 25 saves / 28 shots		Goalie stats		Al Smith 23 saves / 27 shots

Montreal won series 3–0

=== (4) Boston Bruins vs. (13) Pittsburgh Penguins ===
This was the second playoff series meeting between these two teams. This was a rematch of the previous year's Stanley Cup Quarterfinals, which Boston won in a four-game sweep.

April 8	Pittsburgh Penguins	4–2	Boston Bruins	Boston Garden	Recap
No Scoring		First period	No Scoring
Mark Johnson (1) – pp – 08:25; Gary McAdam (1) – 14:47		Second period	No Scoring
Mark Johnson (2) – 03:10; Gregg Sheppard (1) – en – 19:24		Third period	13:44 – pp – Terry O'Reilly (1); 18:47 – Craig MacTavish (1)
Greg Millen 36 saves / 38 shots		Goalie stats	Gerry Cheevers 18 saves / 21 shots

April 10	Pittsburgh Penguins	1–4	Boston Bruins	Boston Garden	Recap
No Scoring		First period	No Scoring
No Scoring		Second period	01:42 – Rick Middleton (1); 10:38 – Don Marcotte (1); 11:21 – Brad Park (1)
Rod Schutt (1) – 12:16		Third period	11:15 – Wayne Cashman (1)
Greg Millen 38 saves / 42 shots		Goalie stats	Gerry Cheevers 16 saves / 17 shots

April 12	Boston Bruins	1–4	Pittsburgh Penguins	Civic Arena	Recap
No Scoring		First period	13:28 – Ross Lonsberry (1)
No Scoring		Second period	01:17 – Ross Lonsberry (2); 16:37 – Randy Carlyle (1)
Rick Middleton (2) – 03:48		Third period	13:51 – Rod Schutt (2)
Gerry Cheevers 24 saves / 28 shots		Goalie stats	Greg Millen 19 saves / 20 shots

April 13	Boston Bruins	8–3	Pittsburgh Penguins	Civic Arena	Recap
Peter McNab (1) – 05:13; Rick Middleton (3) – 06:42; Ray Bourque (1) – 13:26; Peter McNab (2) – pp – 16:00; Craig MacTavish (2) – 18:09		First period	No Scoring
Bob Miller (1) – sh – 06:31; Dwight Foster (1) – sh – 10:08		Second period	No Scoring
Dwight Foster 2 – 16:45		Third period	06:43 – pp – Rick Kehoe (1); 14:40 – pp – Ron Stackhouse (1); 14:47 – pp – Rick Kehoe (2)
Gerry Cheevers 23 saves / 26 shots		Goalie stats	Greg Millen 21 saves / 29 shots

April 14	Pittsburgh Penguins	2–6	Boston Bruins	Boston Garden	Recap
No Scoring		First period	03:49 – Peter McNab (3); 04:57 – Bob Miller (2)
No Scoring		Second period	05:22 – Dwight Foster (3); 10:20 – pp – Wayne Cashman (2)
Bob Stewart (1) – 03:18; Nick Libett (1) – pp – 16:10		Third period	06:25 – pp – Terry O'Reilly (2); 14:22 – Brad Park (2)
Greg Millen 24 saves / 30 shots		Goalie stats	Gerry Cheevers 22 saves / 24 shots

Boston won series 3–2

=== (5) New York Islanders vs. (12) Los Angeles Kings ===
This was the first playoff series meeting between these two teams.

April 8	Los Angeles Kings	1–8	New York Islanders	Nassau Coliseum	Recap
No Scoring		First period	05:46 – Bryan Trottier (1); 18:07 – Wayne Merrick (1)
No Scoring		Second period	04:30 – sh – Bryan Trottier (2); 10:19 – Mike Bossy (1); 11:29 – Bob Nystrom (1); 14:14 – Gord Lane (1); 19:20 – sh – Bryan Trottier (3)
Rob Palmer (1) – 19:20		Third period	02:15 – Stefan Persson (1)
Doug Keans 13 saves / 20 shots Mario Lessard 13 saves / 14 shots		Goalie stats	Billy Smith 23 saves / 24 shots

April 9	Los Angeles Kings	6–3	New York Islanders	Nassau Coliseum	Recap
Mike Murphy (1) – sh – 05:54; Dave Taylor (1) – 13:59; Glenn Goldup (1) – 15:21; Andre St. Laurent (1) – sh – 18:31		First period	No Scoring
Dave Taylor (2) – 04:00; Steve Carlson (1) – 11:59		Second period	15:49 – pp – Bob Bourne (1); 16:55 – John Tonelli (1)
No Scoring		Third period	07:38 – Garry Howatt (1)
Mario Lessard 30 saves / 33 shots		Goalie stats	Glenn Resch 20 saves / 26 shots Billy Smith 6 saves / 6 shots

April 11	New York Islanders	4–3	OT	Los Angeles Kings	The Forum	Recap
Bob Bourne (2) – pp – 03:47		First period		01:31 – Mark Hardy (1); 06:42 – pp – Charlie Simmer (1)
No Scoring		Second period		10:47 – Charlie Simmer (2)
Clark Gillies (1) – 03:22; Butch Goring (1) – 06:34		Third period		No Scoring
Ken Morrow (1) – 06:55		First overtime period		No Scoring
Billy Smith 20 saves / 23 shots		Goalie stats		Mario Lessard 34 saves / 38 shots

April 12	New York Islanders	6–0	Los Angeles Kings	The Forum	Recap
Garry Howatt (2) – 15:05		First period	No Scoring
Bob Bourne (3) – pp – 09:27		Second period	No Scoring
Alex McKendry (1) – 01:46; John Tonelli (2) – 05:22; Butch Goring (2) – 06:17; Alex McKendry (2) – 10:15		Third period	No Scoring
Billy Smith 20 saves / 20 shots		Goalie stats	Mario Lessard 26 saves / 32 shots

New York won series 3–1

=== (6) Minnesota North Stars vs. (11) Toronto Maple Leafs ===
This was the first playoff series meeting between these two teams.

April 8	Toronto Maple Leafs	3–6	Minnesota North Stars	Met Center	Recap
Laurie Boschman (1) – pp – 10:37; Ron Wilson (1) – pp – 15:51		First period	02:17 – pp – Steve Payne (1); 19:15 – pp – Gary Sargent (1)
No scoring		Second period	11:35 – pp – Curt Giles (1); 15:47 – Steve Payne (2)
Rick Vaive (1) – 13:03		Third period	04:47 – Mike Eaves (1); 15:41 – Steve Christoff (1)
Jiri Crha 55 saves / 61 shots		Goalie stats	Gary Edwards 22 saves / 25 shots

April 9	Toronto Maple Leafs	2–7	Minnesota North Stars	Met Center	Recap
No scoring		First period	15:49 – pp – Craig Hartsburg (1)
No scoring		Second period	04:31 – Al MacAdam (1); 11:14 – Gary Sargent (2); 17:00 – pp – Tim Young (1)
Terry Martin (1) – 05:16; Darryl Sittler (1) – pp – 09:15		Third period	12:36 – Tom McCarthy (1); 13:12 – Al MacAdam (2); 18:31 – Mike Polich (1)
Mike Palmateer 36 saves / 43 shots		Goalie stats	Gary Edwards 27 saves / 29 shots

April 11	Minnesota North Stars	4–3	OT	Toronto Maple Leafs	Maple Leaf Gardens	Recap
Steve Christoff (2) – pp – 03:08		First period		11:51 – Terry Martin (2)
No scoring		Second period		08:14 – pp – Borje Salming (1)
Tom McCarthy (2) – pp – 01:04; Steve Christoff (3) – 04:25		Third period		14:47 – John Anderson (1)
Al MacAdam (3) – 00:32		First overtime period		No scoring
Gary Edwards 19 saves / 21 shots Gilles Meloche 12 saves / 13 shots		Goalie stats		Jiri Crha 27 saves / 31 shots

Minnesota won series 3–0

=== (7) Chicago Black Hawks vs. (10) St. Louis Blues ===
This was the second playoff series meeting between these two teams. Chicago won the only previous meeting in five games in the 1973 Stanley Cup Quarterfinals.

With their victory in game one, Chicago snapped a record 16-game losing streak in the Stanley Cup playoffs.

April 8	St. Louis Blues	2–3	OT	Chicago Black Hawks	Chicago Stadium	Recap
No Scoring		First period		03:39 – Grant Mulvey (1)
Larry Patey (1) – 05:53		Second period		No Scoring
Wayne Babych (1) – 14:42		Third period		14:10 – Ted Bulley (1)
No Scoring		First overtime period		12:34 – Doug Lecuyer (1)
Mike Liut 42 saves / 45 shots		Goalie stats		Tony Esposito 31 saves / 33 shots

April 9	St. Louis Blues	1–5	Chicago Black Hawks	Chicago Stadium	Recap
No Scoring		First period	00:23 – Doug Wilson (1); 12:46 – pp – Ron Sedlbauer (1)
Perry Turnbull (1) – pp – 13:40		Second period	No Scoring
No Scoring		Third period	01:16 – pp – Tom Lysiak (1); 15:23 – Doug Wilson (2); 19:04 – Ted Bulley (2)
Mike Liut 31 saves / 36 shots		Goalie stats	Tony Esposito 30 saves / 31 shots

April 11	Chicago Black Hawks	4–1	St. Louis Blues	Checkerdome	Recap
Doug Lecuyer (2) – 03:46		First period	No Scoring
Darryl Sutter (1) – pp – 03:29		Second period	No Scoring
Bob Murray (1) – 14:57; Doug Lecuyer (3) – 16:35		Third period	15:37 – Bernie Federko (1)
Tony Esposito 23 saves / 24 shots		Goalie stats	Mike Liut 25 saves / 29 shots

Chicago won series 3–0

=== (8) New York Rangers vs. (9) Atlanta Flames ===
This was the first playoff series meeting between these two teams. Game four was also the final home game for the Flames in Atlanta, as the franchise was sold and relocated to Calgary during the offseason.

April 8	Atlanta Flames	1–2	OT	New York Rangers	Madison Square Garden	Recap
No scoring		First period		No scoring
Don Lever (1) – pp – 04:57		Second period		No scoring
No scoring		Third period		08:14 – Steve Vickers (1)
No scoring		First overtime period		00:33 – Steve Vickers (2)
Dan Bouchard 29 saves / 31 shots		Goalie stats		John Davidson 21 saves / 22 shots

April 9	Atlanta Flames	1–5	New York Rangers	Madison Square Garden	Recap
No scoring		First period	03:02 – pp – Phil Esposito (1); 06:32 – Anders Hedberg (1); 12:33 – sh – Dave Maloney (1); 14:32 – Phil Esposito (2)
No scoring		Second period	No scoring
Willi Plett (1) – pp – 09:05		Third period	15:18 – Warren Miller (1)
Dan Bouchard 27 saves / 32 shots		Goalie stats	John Davidson 20 saves / 21 shots

April 11	New York Rangers	2–4	Atlanta Flames	Omni Coliseum	Recap
Dave Maloney (2) – 13:11		First period	14:56 – Bob Murdoch (1)
Anders Hedberg (2) – 04:07		Second period	03:34 – Ken Houston (1); 05:47 – Eric Vail (1); 16:15 – Eric Vail (2)
No scoring		Third period	No scoring
John Davidson 29 saves / 33 shots		Goalie stats	Dan Bouchard 25 saves / 27 shots

April 12	New York Rangers	5–2	Atlanta Flames	Omni Coliseum	Recap
Anders Hedberg (3) – 01:58; Dean Talafous (1) – pp – 06:09; Ed Hospodar (1) – 06:43		First period	09:07 – pp – Eric Vail (3)
Carol Vadnais (1) – 04:10		Second period	No scoring
Barry Beck (1) – pp – 13:23		Third period	08:14 – pp – Guy Chouinard (1)
John Davidson 30 saves / 32 shots		Goalie stats	Dan Bouchard 22 saves / 27 shots

New York won series 3–1

== Quarterfinals ==
=== (1) Philadelphia Flyers vs. (8) New York Rangers ===
This was the third playoff series meeting between these two teams. Both teams split their previous two meetings. This was a rematch of the previous year's Stanley Cup Quarterfinals, which New York won in five games.

April 16	New York Rangers	1–2	Philadelphia Flyers	Spectrum	Recap
No scoring		First period	04:49 – Rick MacLeish (2)
No scoring		Second period	No scoring
Ray Markham (1) – 03:47		Third period	05:44 – Behn Wilson (3)
John Davidson 40 saves / 42 shots		Goalie stats	Pete Peeters 29 saves / 30 shots

April 17	New York Rangers	1–4	Philadelphia Flyers	Spectrum	Recap
No scoring		First period	No scoring
No scoring		Second period	10:25 – Paul Holmgren (3); 10:39 – Bill Barber (1)
Ron Duguay (1) – 14:41		Third period	14:26 – Rick MacLeish (3); 18:32 – sh – en – Reggie Leach (3)
John Davidson 37 saves / 40 shots		Goalie stats	Pete Peeters 31 saves / 32 shots

April 19	Philadelphia Flyers	3–0	New York Rangers	Madison Square Garden	Recap
Bob Dailey (1) – sh – 08:39		First period	No scoring
No scoring		Second period	No scoring
Bill Barber (2) – 04:16; Rick MacLeish (4) – 09:43		Third period	No scoring
Pete Peeters 29 saves / 29 shots		Goalie stats	John Davidson 32 saves / 35 shots

April 20	Philadelphia Flyers	2–4	New York Rangers	Madison Square Garden	Recap
Rick MacLeish (5) – 13:10		First period	05:05 – pp – Ron Duguay (2)
No scoring		Second period	05:02 – pp – Ron Duguay (3); 09:26 – Phil Esposito (3)
Reggie Leach (4) – 15:32		Third period	05:42 – Ron Duguay (4)
Pete Peeters 22 saves / 26 shots		Goalie stats	John Davidson 31 saves / 33 shots

April 22	New York Rangers	1–3	Philadelphia Flyers	Spectrum	Recap
No scoring		First period	19:03 – Al Hill (1)
No scoring		Second period	05:09 – Behn Wilson (4); 08:24 – Paul Holmgren (4)
Ron Duguay (5) – 14:27		Third period	No scoring
John Davidson 27 saves / 30 shots		Goalie stats	Pete Peeters 25 saves / 26 shots

Philadelphia won series 4–1

=== (2) Buffalo Sabres vs. (7) Chicago Black Hawks ===
This was the second playoff series meeting between these two teams. Buffalo won the only previous meeting in five games in the 1975 Stanley Cup Quarterfinals.

April 16	Chicago Black Hawks	0–5	Buffalo Sabres	Buffalo Memorial Auditorium	Recap
No scoring		First period	12:09 – pp – John Van Boxmeer (1); 18:24 – pp – Gilbert Perreault (3)
No scoring		Second period	11:32 – pp – Danny Gare (2); 12:08 – Bob Mongrain (1)
No scoring		Third period	19:40 – pp – Rick Dudley (1)
Tony Esposito 25 saves / 30 shots		Goalie stats	Don Edwards 17 saves / 17 shots

April 17	Chicago Black Hawks	4–6	Buffalo Sabres	Buffalo Memorial Auditorium	Recap
Tom Lysiak (2) – pp – 18:24		First period	08:48 – pp – Danny Gare (3); 13:17 – Ric Seiling (3)
Tom Lysiak (3) – pp – 03:49; Doug Lecuyer (4) – 17:06		Second period	06:31 – Don Luce (2); 11:22 – Ric Seiling (4); 15:20 – pp – Danny Gare (4)
Darryl Sutter (2) – 02:09		Third period	16:24 – Rick Martin (5)
Mike Veisor 19 saves / 25 shots		Goalie stats	Bob Sauve 17 saves / 21 shots

April 19	Buffalo Sabres	2–1	Chicago Black Hawks	Chicago Stadium	Recap
Ric Seiling (5) – 03:53; Rick Dudley (2) – 05:37		First period	No scoring
No scoring		Second period	14:11 – pp – Darryl Sutter (3)
No scoring		Third period	No scoring
Don Edwards 38 saves / 39 shots		Goalie stats	Tony Esposito 30 saves / 32 shots

April 20	Buffalo Sabres	3–2	Chicago Black Hawks	Chicago Stadium	Recap
No scoring		First period	13:26 – Bob Murray (2)
John Van Boxmeer (2) – 19:32		Second period	09:55 – pp – Tom Lysiak (4)
Rick Martin (6) – 08:47; Gilbert Perreault (4) – 16:54		Third period	No scoring
Bob Sauve 46 saves / 48 shots		Goalie stats	Tony Esposito 31 saves / 34 shots

Buffalo won series 4–0

=== (3) Montreal Canadiens vs. (6) Minnesota North Stars ===
This was the second playoff series meeting between these two teams. Montreal won the only previous meeting in six games in the 1971 Stanley Cup Semifinals. This was Montreal's first playoff series loss since losing to Buffalo in the 1975 Stanley Cup Semifinals.

Al MacAdam's goal with 1:26 left in the third period of game seven won the series for the North Stars and sent them to the semifinals.

April 16	Minnesota North Stars	3–0	Montreal Canadiens	Forum de Montréal	Recap
No scoring		First period	No scoring
No scoring		Second period	No scoring
Kent-Erik Andersson – 02:51; Steve Payne (3) – 15:13; Al MacAdam (4) – 16:52		Third period	No scoring
Gilles Meloche 23 saves / 23 shots		Goalie stats	Denis Herron 25 saves / 28 shots

April 17	Minnesota North Stars	4–1	Montreal Canadiens	Forum de Montréal	Recap
Tom McCarthy (3) – pp – 19:11		First period	No scoring
Steve Payne (4) – 04:18		Second period	05:27 – Yvon Lambert (7)
Steve Payne (5) – 03:45; Curt Giles (2) – pp – 10:01		Third period	No scoring
Gilles Meloche 40 saves / 41 shots		Goalie stats	Denis Herron 28 saves / 32 shots

April 19	Montreal Canadiens	5–0	Minnesota North Stars	Met Center	Recap
Norm Dupont (1) – 12:49; Doug Jarvis (2) – 16:27		First period	No scoring
Doug Jarvis (3) – 05:43; Rod Langway (1) – pp – 17:39		Second period	No scoring
Pierre Larouche (1) – 02:45		Third period	No scoring
Michel Larocque 25 saves / 25 shots		Goalie stats	Gilles Meloche 31 saves / 36 shots

April 20	Montreal Canadiens	5–1	Minnesota North Stars	Met Center	Recap
Rejean Houle (3) – pp – 06:33		First period	No scoring
Steve Shutt (3) – 13:34		Second period	No scoring
Rejean Houle (4) – 07:15; Yvon Lambert (8) – 11:40; Rod Langway (2) – 19:32		Third period	04:15 – Steve Christoff (4)
Michel Larocque 22 saves / 23 shots		Goalie stats	Gilles Meloche 31 saves / 36 shots

April 22	Minnesota North Stars	2–6	Montreal Canadiens	Forum de Montréal	Recap
Steve Christoff (5) – 11:32		First period	09:23 – Steve Shutt (4); 14:51 – Pierre Mondou (1)
Al MacAdam (5) – 05:28		Second period	08:43 – pp – Steve Shutt (5)
No scoring		Third period	04:15 – sh – Doug Jarvis (4); 10:28 – pp – Brian Engblom (2); 15:07 – Steve Shutt (6)
Gilles Meloche 32 saves / 38 shots		Goalie stats	Michel Larocque 29 saves / 31 shots

April 24	Montreal Canadiens	2–5	Minnesota North Stars	Met Center	Recap
Mark Napier (1) – 05:23		First period	No scoring
No scoring		Second period	05:22 – pp – Steve Christoff (6); 10:29 – Kent-Erik Andersson (2); 13:20 – Paul Shmyr (1); 13:47 – pp – Bobby Smith (1); 19:16 – Glen Sharpley (1)
Rick Chartraw (2) – 05:08		Third period	No scoring
Michel Larocque 31 saves / 36 shots		Goalie stats	Gilles Meloche 26 saves / 28 shots

April 27	Minnesota North Stars	3–2	Montreal Canadiens	Forum de Montréal	Recap
Tom Younghans (1) – sh – 14:43		First period	09:12 – pp – Mark Napier (2)
Craig Hartsburg (2) – pp – 16:46		Second period	No scoring
Al MacAdam (6) – 18:34		Third period	05:23 – Rod Langway (3)
Gilles Meloche 22 saves / 24 shots		Goalie stats	Denis Herron 27 saves / 30 shots

Minnesota won series 4–3

=== (4) Boston Bruins vs. (5) New York Islanders ===
This was the first playoff series meeting between these two teams.

April 16	New York Islanders	2–1	OT	Boston Bruins	Boston Garden	Recap
No Scoring		First period		No Scoring
No Scoring		Second period		No Scoring
Garry Howatt (3) – 03:49		Third period		00:51 – Peter McNab (4)
Clark Gillies (2) – 01:02		First overtime period		No Scoring
Billy Smith 22 saves / 23 shots		Goalie stats		Gerry Cheevers 25 saves / 27 shots

April 17	New York Islanders	5–4	OT	Boston Bruins	Boston Garden	Recap
Bryan Trottier (4) – 16:08		First period		No Scoring
John Tonelli (3) – 10:40; Lorne Henning (1) – sh – 14:33		Second period		01:32 – Rick Smith (1); 12:00 – Brad McCrimmon (1); 16:55 – Brad Park (3)
Bob Nystrom (2) – 11:06		Third period		10:51 – Bob Miller (3)
Bob Bourne (4) – 01:24		First overtime period		No Scoring
Billy Smith 29 saves / 33 shots		Goalie stats		Gerry Cheevers 18 saves / 23 shots

April 19	Boston Bruins	3–5	New York Islanders	Nassau Coliseum	Recap
Don Marcotte (2) – 09:52		First period	12:16 – John Tonelli (4); 17:08 – pp – Bryan Trottier (5)
Peter McNab (5) – 09:48		Second period	06:57 – Bob Bourne (5); 15:54 – Bobby Nystrom (3)
Peter McNab (6) – pp – 12:15		Third period	04:51 – Bryan Trottier (6)
Gerry Cheevers 30 saves / 35 shots		Goalie stats	Billy Smith 32 saves / 35 shots

April 21	Boston Bruins	4–3	OT	New York Islanders	Nassau Coliseum	Recap
Ray Bourque (2) – 09:21		First period		12:03 – Mike Bossy (2)
No scoring		Second period		08:18 – pp – Mike Bossy (3)
Peter McNab (7) – 03:09; Rick Middleton (4) – 19:40		Third period		13:20 – Clark Gillies (3)
Terry O'Reilly (3) – 17:13		First overtime period		No scoring
Gerry Cheevers 27 saves / 30 shots		Goalie stats		Billy Smith 35 saves / 39 shots

April 22	New York Islanders	4–2	Boston Bruins	Boston Garden	Recap
No Scoring		First period	01:31 – Wayne Cashman (3); 03:28 – pp – Peter McNab (8)
Stefan Persson (2) – pp – 17:23		Second period	No Scoring
Duane Sutter (1) – 02:38; Clark Gillies (4) – 05:58; Denis Potvin (1) – 14:27		Third period	No Scoring
Billy Smith 22 saves / 24 shots		Goalie stats	Gerry Cheevers 20 saves / 24 shots

New York won series 4–1

== Semifinals ==
=== (1) Philadelphia Flyers vs. (4) Minnesota North Stars ===
This was the second playoff series meeting between these two teams. Philadelphia won the only previous meeting in six games in the 1973 Stanley Cup Quarterfinals.

April 29	Minnesota North Stars	6–5	Philadelphia Flyers	Spectrum	Recap
Steve Christoff (7) – 04:19; Paul Shmyr (2) – pp – 13:20; Steve Christoff (8) – 13:59		First period	05:23 – pp – Al Hill (2); 14:54 – Ken Linseman (2); 15:36 – Tom Gorence (2); 16:40 – Ken Linseman (3)
Mike Eaves (2) – 14:04; Steve Payne (6) – pp – 16:46		Second period	No scoring
Steve Payne (7) – pp – 07:40		Third period	09:27 – Paul Holmgren (5)
Gilles Meloche 7 saves / 11 shots Gary Edwards 21 saves / 22 shots		Goalie stats	Pete Peeters 30 saves / 36 shots

May 1	Minnesota North Stars	0–7	Philadelphia Flyers	Spectrum	Recap
No scoring		First period	02:09 – pp – Paul Holmgren (6); 03:20 – sh – Bill Barber (3)
No scoring		Second period	00:56 – pp – Bobby Clarke (3); 08:42 – pp – Bob Dailey (2); 11:27 – pp – Brian Propp (2)
No scoring		Third period	16:23 – Al Hill (3); 19:20 – Reggie Leach (5)
Gary Edwards 33 saves / 40 shots		Goalie stats	Phil Myre 27 saves / 27 shots

May 4	Philadelphia Flyers	5–3	Minnesota North Stars	Met Center	Recap
Bill Barber (4) – pp – 15:15; Bill Barber (5) – 17:09		First period	No scoring
Mel Bridgman (1) – 01:14; Bill Barber (6) – 06:07		Second period	14:39 – sh – Tom Younghans (2); 15:34 – sh – Tim Young (2); 17:27 – pp – Tom McCarthy (4)
Bill Barber (7) – sh – 16:34		Third period	No scoring
Phil Myre 31 saves / 34 shots		Goalie stats	Gilles Meloche 23 saves / 28 shots

May 6	Philadelphia Flyers	3–2	Minnesota North Stars	Met Center	Recap
Reggie Leach (6) – 16:51		First period	13:18 – Tom McCarthy (5)
Bill Barber (8) – 13:54		Second period	No scoring
Bill Barber (9) – 02:43		Third period	13:54 – Mike Polich (2)
Phil Myre 30 saves / 32 shots		Goalie stats	Gary Edwards 29 saves / 32 shots

May 8	Minnesota North Stars	3–7	Philadelphia Flyers	Spectrum	Recap
Craig Hartsburg (3) – 00:44; Al MacAdam (7) – pp – 17:11		First period	02:23 – pp – Rick MacLeish (6); 06:26 – sh – Bill Barber (10); 12:16 – pp – Reggie Leach (7)
Rob Flockhart (1) – 14:43		Second period	03:33 – Reggie Leach (8); 06:02 – Bill Barber (11); 16:19 – Bobby Clarke (4)
No scoring		Third period	No scoring
Gary Edwards 7 saves / 11 shots Gilles Meloche 14 saves / 17 shots		Goalie stats	Phil Myre 22 saves / 25 shots

Philadelphia won series 4–1

=== (2) Buffalo Sabres vs. (3) New York Islanders ===
This was the third playoff series meeting between these two teams. New York won both previous meetings in consecutive years, the latter of which was a four-game sweep in the 1977 Stanley Cup Quarterfinals.

April 29	New York Islanders	4–1	Buffalo Sabres	Buffalo Memorial Auditorium	Recap
Bob Bourne (6) – sh – 13:06; Mike Bossy (4) – 17:42		First period	05:23 – Rick Dudley (3)
John Tonelli (5) – 09:56		Second period	No scoring
John Tonelli (6) – 11:10		Third period	No scoring
Billy Smith 31 saves / 32 shots		Goalie stats	Don Edwards 25 saves / 29 shots

May 1	New York Islanders	2–1	2OT	Buffalo Sabres	Buffalo Memorial Auditorium	Recap
No scoring		First period		No scoring
Butch Goring (3) – 15:02		Second period		No scoring
No scoring		Third period		11:47 – Andre Savard (1)
Bobby Nystrom (4) – 01:20		Second overtime period		No scoring
Billy Smith 41 saves / 42 shots		Goalie stats		Bob Sauve 31 saves / 33 shots

May 3	Buffalo Sabres	4–7	New York Islanders	Nassau Coliseum	Recap
Tony McKegney (2) – 19:28		First period	05:14 – Mike Bossy (5); 12:47 – Wayne Merrick (2)
Gilbert Perreault (5) – 08:12		Second period	08:57 – Bryan Trottier (7); 18:26 – pp – Bryan Trottier (8)
Derek Smith (3) – pp – 10:11; Lindy Ruff (1) – 11:09		Third period	02:59 – sh – Lorne Henning (2); 07:47 – pp – Bob Bourne (7); 19:38 – en – Butch Goring (4)
Don Edwards 34 saves / 40 shots		Goalie stats	Billy Smith 23 saves / 27 shots

May 6	Buffalo Sabres	7–4	New York Islanders	Nassau Coliseum	Recap
Don Luce (3) – sh – 16:14		First period	08:52 – pp – Bob Bourne (8); 19:13 – Bob Bourne (9)
Derek Smith (4) – 07:21; Gilbert Perreault (6) – pp – 09:29; Gilbert Perreault (7) – 11:10; Derek Smith (5) – pp – 19:30		Second period	03:28 – Bob Nystrom (5)
Tony McKegney (3) – 12:14; Gilbert Perreault (8) – en – 19:47		Third period	01:51 – Bob Nystrom (6)
Bob Sauve 27 saves / 31 shots		Goalie stats	Billy Smith 19 saves / 24 shots Glenn Resch 9 saves / 10 shots

May 8	New York Islanders	0–2	Buffalo Sabres	Buffalo Memorial Auditorium	Recap
No scoring		First period	01:51 – pp – John Van Boxmeer (3)
No scoring		Second period	14:45 – pp – Richie Dunn (2)
No scoring		Third period	No scoring
Glenn Resch 13 saves / 15 shots		Goalie stats	Bob Sauve 22 saves / 22 shots

May 10	Buffalo Sabres	2–5	New York Islanders	Nassau Coliseum	Recap
Gilbert Perreault (9) – 02:26; Gilbert Perreault (10) – 06:53		First period	08:08 – John Tonelli (7)
No scoring		Second period	00:31 – pp – Mike Bossy (6); 11:11 – Bob Lorimer (1)
No scoring		Third period	11:50 – Duane Sutter (2); 19:00 – sh – en – Bob Bourne (10)
Bob Sauve 26 saves / 30 shots		Goalie stats	Billy Smith 22 saves / 24 shots

New York won series 4–2

== Stanley Cup Finals ==
This was the second playoff series (and only Finals) meeting between these two teams. Philadelphia won the only previous meeting in seven games in the 1975 Stanley Cup Semifinals.

Ken Morrow became the first player in history to win an Olympic Gold Medal and the Stanley Cup in the same season. Game six was the last NHL game to air on American network television for nearly ten years.

May 13	New York Islanders	4–3	OT	Philadelphia Flyers	Spectrum	Recap
Mike Bossy (7) – pp – 12:02		First period		10:31 – Mel Bridgman (2)
Denis Potvin (2) – 02:20		Second period		17:08 – pp – Bobby Clarke (5)
Stefan Persson (3) – pp – 16:18		Third period		13:10 – Rick MacLeish (7)
Denis Potvin (3) – pp – 04:07		First overtime period		No scoring
Billy Smith 30 saves / 33 shots		Goalie stats		Pete Peeters 32 saves / 36 shots

May 15	New York Islanders	3–8	Philadelphia Flyers	Spectrum	Recap
Butch Goring (5) – 03:23		First period	07:22 – pp – Paul Holmgren (7); 08:37 – Bob Kelly (1); 17:23 – Bobby Clarke (6)
Bryan Trottier (9) – pp – 03:28		Second period	01:06 – Bill Barber (12); 04:13 – pp – Paul Holmgren (8); 15:47 – pp – Brian Propp (3)
Butch Goring (6) – pp – 15:00		Third period	01:40 – Tom Gorence (3); 04:19 – Paul Holmgren (9)
Billy Smith 20 saves / 26 shots Chico Resch 3 saves / 5 shots		Goalie stats	Pete Peeters 20 saves / 23 shots

May 17	Philadelphia Flyers	2–6	New York Islanders	Nassau Coliseum	Recap
No scoring		First period	02:38 – sh – Lorne Henning (3); 07:43 – pp – Denis Potvin (4); 13:04 – pp – Bryan Trottier (10); 14:29 – pp – Mike Bossy (8)
No scoring		Second period	15:41 – pp – Clark Gillies (5); 17:25 – pp – Denis Potvin (5)
Bobby Clarke (7) – 09:48; Mike Busniuk (1) – 11:32		Third period	No scoring
Phil Myre 34 saves / 40 shots		Goalie stats	Billy Smith 30 saves / 32 shots

May 19	Philadelphia Flyers	2–5	New York Islanders	Nassau Coliseum	Recap
No scoring		First period	07:23 – pp – Mike Bossy (9); 13:06 – Butch Goring (7)
John Paddock (1) – 01:35		Second period	No scoring
Ken Linseman (4) – 11:53		Third period	06:06 – Bryan Trottier (11); 12:35 – Bob Nystrom (7); 14:08 – Clark Gillies (6)
Pete Peeters 22 saves / 27 shots		Goalie stats	Billy Smith 34 saves / 36 shots

May 22	New York Islanders	3–6	Philadelphia Flyers	Spectrum	Recap
Stefan Persson (4) – pp – 10:58		First period	No scoring
Bryan Trottier (12) – 16:16		Second period	01:45 – Bobby Clarke (8); 05:55 – Rick MacLeish (8); 17:04 – Mike Busniuk (2)
Stefan Persson (5) – pp – 14:57		Third period	09:43 – Rick MacLeish (9); 12:33 – pp – Brian Propp (4); 17:26 – Paul Holmgren (10)
Billy Smith 25 saves / 31 shots		Goalie stats	Pete Peeters 35 saves / 38 shots

May 24	Philadelphia Flyers	4–5	OT	New York Islanders	Nassau Coliseum	Recap
Reggie Leach (9) – pp – 07:21; Brian Propp (5) – 18:58		First period		11:56 – pp – Denis Potvin (6); 14:08 – Duane Sutter (3)
No scoring		Second period		07:34 – pp – Mike Bossy (10); 19:46 – Bob Nystrom (8)
Bob Dailey (4) – 01:47; John Paddock (2) – 06:02		Third period		No scoring
No scoring		First overtime period		07:11 – Bob Nystrom (9)
Pete Peeters 28 saves / 33 shots		Goalie stats		Billy Smith 21 saves / 25 shots

New York won series 4–2

== Player statistics ==
=== Skaters ===
These are the top ten skaters based on points.

Player	Team	GP	G	A	Pts	+/–	PIM
Bryan Trottier	New York Islanders	21	12	17	29	+8	16
Mike Bossy	New York Islanders	16	10	13	23	-4	8
Ken Linseman	Philadelphia Flyers	17	4	18	22	+13	40
Bill Barber	Philadelphia Flyers	19	12	9	21	+10	23
Gilbert Perreault	Buffalo Sabres	14	10	11	21	+3	8
Bob Bourne	New York Islanders	21	10	10	20	+2	10
Bobby Clarke	Philadelphia Flyers	19	8	12	20	+10	16
Paul Holmgren	Philadelphia Flyers	18	10	10	20	+15	47
Butch Goring	New York Islanders	21	7	12	19	+8	2
Denis Potvin	New York Islanders	21	6	13	19	+10	24

=== Goaltenders ===
This is a combined table of the top five goaltenders based on goals against average and the top five goaltenders based on save percentage, with at least 420 minutes. The table is sorted by GAA, and the criteria for inclusion are bolded.

Player	Team	GP	W	L	SA	GA	GAA	SV%	SO	TOI
Bob Sauve	Buffalo Sabres	8	6	2	231	17	**2.04**	**.926**	2	499:19
John Davidson	New York Rangers	9	4	5	288	21	**2.35**	**.927**	0	536:35
Pete Peeters	Philadelphia Flyers	13	8	5	377	37	**2.79**	**.902**	1	497:13
Billy Smith	New York Islanders	20	15	4	559	56	**2.80**	**.903**	1	1198:42
Gerry Cheevers	Boston Bruins	10	4	6	255	32	**3.11**	.875	0	616:51
Gilles Meloche	Minnesota North Stars	11	9	5	295	34	3.63	**.885**	1	562:35

== See also ==
- 1979–80 NHL season
- List of NHL seasons
- List of Stanley Cup champions

Preceded by 1979 Stanley Cup playoffs	Stanley Cup playoffs	Succeeded by 1981 Stanley Cup playoffs
