= 1980 Stanley Cup Final =

1980 ice hockey championship series

	1	2	3	4	5	6	Total
New York Islanders	4*	3	6	5	3	5*	4
Philadelphia Flyers	3*	8	2	2	6	4*	2
- * – Denotes overtime period(s)
- Location(s): Uniondale: Nassau Veterans Memorial Coliseum) (3, 4, 6); Philadelphia: Spectrum (1, 2, 5)
- Coaches: New York: Al Arbour; Philadelphia: Pat Quinn
- Captains: New York: Denis Potvin; Philadelphia: Mel Bridgman
- National anthems: New York: Joe Duerr; Philadelphia: Kate Smith
- Referees: Andy Van Hellemond (1, 4); Wally Harris (2, 5); Bob Myers (3, 6)
- Dates: May 13–24, 1980
- MVP: Bryan Trottier (Islanders)
- Series-winning goal: Bob Nystrom (7:11, OT)
- Hall of Famers: Islanders: Mike Bossy (1991); Clark Gillies (2002); Denis Potvin (1991); Billy Smith (1993); Bryan Trottier (1997); Flyers: Bill Barber (1990); Bobby Clarke (1987); Coaches: Al Arbour (1996); Pat Quinn (2016); Officials: John D'Amico (1993); Ray Scapinello (2008); Andy Van Hellemond (1999)
- Networks: Canada: (English): CBC (French): SRC; United States: (English): Hughes (1–5), CBS (6)
- Announcers: (CBC) Dan Kelly (1–5), Bob Cole (1–2), Jim Robson (3–6), Gary Dornhoefer and Dick Irvin Jr. (SRC) Rene Lecavalier and Gilles Tremblay (Hughes) Simulcast of CBC feed (CBS) Dan Kelly, Tim Ryan, and Lou Nanne

The 1980 Stanley Cup Final was the championship series of the National Hockey League's (NHL) 1979–80 season, and the culmination of the 1980 Stanley Cup playoffs. It was contested by the New York Islanders in their first Final appearance and the Philadelphia Flyers, in their fourth Final appearance, and first since 1976. The Islanders would win the best-of-seven series, four games to two, to win their first Stanley Cup championship and the third for a post-1967 expansion team after Philadelphia's Cup wins in 1974 and 1975.

== Paths to the Final ==
New York defeated the Los Angeles Kings 3–1, the Boston Bruins 4–1 and the Buffalo Sabres 4–2 to advance to the Final.

Philadelphia defeated the Edmonton Oilers 3–0, the New York Rangers 4–1 and the Minnesota North Stars 4–1 to make it to the Final. The Flyers were one of the four Philadelphia professional sports teams to play for their respective sports' championships in the 1980 season. The 76ers would lose to the Los Angeles Lakers in the 1980 NBA Finals, the Phillies would then beat the Kansas City Royals in the World Series, and the Eagles later lost Super Bowl XV to the Oakland Raiders in January 1981.

== Game summaries ==
=== Game one ===
May 13	New York Islanders	4–3	OT	Philadelphia Flyers	Spectrum	Recap

In game one, Denis Potvin scored twice, including the game-winning goal in overtime, which was the first power-play overtime goal in Stanley Cup Final history.

Scoring summary
Period	Team	Goal	Assist(s)	Time	Score
1st	PHI	Mel Bridgman (2)	Unassisted	10:31	1–0 PHI
1st	NYI	Mike Bossy (7) – pp	Bryan Trottier (14)	12:02	1–1
2nd	NYI	Denis Potvin (2)	Clark Gillies (5) and Butch Goring (10)	02:20	2–1 NYI
2nd	PHI	Bobby Clarke (5) – pp	Bill Barber (6) and Reggie Leach (4)	17:08	2–2
3rd	PHI	Rick MacLeish (7)	Paul Holmgren (7)	13:10	3–2 PHI
3rd	NYI	Stefan Persson (3) – pp	Mike Bossy (7) and Denis Potvin (10)	16:18	3–3
OT	NYI	Denis Potvin (3) – pp	John Tonelli (7) and Bob Nystrom (9)	04:07	4–3 NYI
Penalty summary
Period	Team	Player	Penalty	Time	PIM
1st	NYI	Duane Sutter	Elbowing	09:36	2:00
1st	PHI	Behn Wilson	High-sticking	09:36	2:00
1st	PHI	Bob Dailey	Tripping	11:51	2:00
2nd	NYI	Duane Sutter	Fighting – major	02:56	5:00
2nd	PHI	Jimmy Watson	Fighting – major	02:56	5:00
2nd	PHI	Ken Linseman	Hooking	12:00	2:00
2nd	NYI	Bob Lorimer	Hooking	16:08	2:00
3rd	PHI	Bobby Clarke	Tripping	02:33	2:00
3rd	NYI	Stefan Persson	Holding	10:49	2:00
3rd	PHI	Al Hill	Hooking	14:35	2:00
OT	PHI	Jimmy Watson	Holding	02:08	2:00

Shots by period
Team	1	2	3	OT	Total
New York	15	9	11	1	36
Philadelphia	9	12	11	1	33

=== Game two ===
May 15	New York Islanders	3–8	Philadelphia Flyers	Spectrum	Recap

After the Islanders drew first blood in game two, Paul Holmgren recorded a hat trick, Bobby Clarke and Bob Dailey each recorded three points for Philadelphia. After Billy Smith had allowed 6 goals on 26 shots after two periods, Islanders coach Al Arbour was prompted to replace him with backup goaltender Glenn Resch. The Flyers cruised to an 8–3 victory to tie the series at a game apiece.

Scoring summary
Period	Team	Goal	Assist(s)	Time	Score
1st	NYI	Butch Goring (5)	Clark Gillies (6) and Duane Sutter (5)	03:23	1–0 NYI
1st	PHI	Paul Holmgren (7) – pp	Brian Propp (8) and Bob Dailey (11)	07:22	1–1
1st	PHI	Bob Kelly (1)	Behn Wilson (6) and Bobby Clarke (10)	08:37	2–1 PHI
1st	PHI	Bobby Clarke (6)	Jimmy Watson (14) and Bill Barber (7)	17:23	3–1 PHI
2nd	PHI	Bill Barber (12)	Bobby Clarke (11) and Reggie Leach (5)	01:06	4–1 PHI
2nd	NYI	Bryan Trottier (9) – pp	Mike Bossy (8)	03:28	4–2 PHI
2nd	PHI	Paul Holmgren (8) – pp	Ken Linseman (12) and Bill Barber (8)	04:13	5–2 PHI
2nd	PHI	Brian Propp (3) – pp	Bob Dailey (12) and Bobby Clarke (12)	15:47	6–2 PHI
3rd	PHI	Tom Gorence (3)	Bob Dailey (13) and Mel Bridgman (7)	01:40	7–2 PHI
3rd	PHI	Paul Holmgren (9)	Ken Linseman (13) and Behn Wilson (7)	04:19	8–2 PHI
3rd	NYI	Butch Goring (6) – pp	Bob Bourne (7) and Stefan Persson (7)	15:00	8–3 PHI
Penalty summary
Period	Team	Player	Penalty	Time	PIM
1st	PHI	Tom Gorence	Hooking	04:09	2:00
1st	NYI	Stefan Persson	Tripping	05:37	2:00
1st	PHI	Ken Linseman	Elbowing	09:31	2:00
1st	PHI	Behn Wilson	Holding	12:10	2:00
2nd	PHI	Andre Dupont	Hooking	03:03	2:00
2nd	NYI	Ken Morrow	Interference	04:02	2:00
2nd	PHI	Behn Wilson	Roughing	05:27	2:00
2nd	NYI	Bob Lorimer	High-sticking	12:54	2:00
2nd	PHI	Brian Propp	High-sticking	12:54	2:00
2nd	NYI	Garry Howatt	Tripping	13:58	2:00
2nd	NYI	Gord Lane	High-sticking – major	14:12	5:00
2nd	NYI	Billy Smith	Slashing	14:12	2:00
2nd	PHI	Bill Barber	Slashing	14:12	2:00
2nd	PHI	Bill Barber	High-sticking – major	14:12	5:00
3rd	PHI	Jack McIlhargey	Tripping	01:55	2:00
3rd	NYI	Duane Sutter	Slashing	05:00	2:00
3rd	NYI	Duane Sutter	Fighting – major	07:01	5:00
3rd	NYI	Duane Sutter	Misconduct	07:01	10:00
3rd	PHI	Mel Bridgman	Fighting – major	07:01	5:00
3rd	PHI	Mel Bridgman	Misconduct	07:01	10:00
3rd	PHI	Behn Wilson	Cross-checking	14:13	5:00
3rd	PHI	Behn Wilson	Roughing	14:13	2:00
3rd	PHI	Behn Wilson	Game misconduct	14:13	10:00
3rd	NYI	Gord Lane	Slashing	19:10	2:00

Shots by period
Team	1	2	3	Total
New York	10	5	8	23
Philadelphia	10	16	5	31

=== Game three ===
May 17	Philadelphia Flyers	2–6	New York Islanders	Nassau Coliseum	Recap

In game three, the Islanders connected on all five of their power plays, with Denis Potvin recording 4 points, and giving the Islanders a 6–2 victory and a 2–1 lead in the series.

Scoring summary
Period	Team	Goal	Assist(s)	Time	Score
1st	NYI	Lorne Henning (3) – sh	Bob Bourne (8)	02:38	1–0 NYI
1st	NYI	Denis Potvin (4) – pp	Unassisted	07:43	2–0 NYI
1st	NYI	Bryan Trottier (10) – pp	Mike Bossy (9) and Denis Potvin (11)	13:04	3–0 NYI
1st	NYI	Mike Bossy (8) – pp	Clark Gillies (7) and Denis Potvin (12)	14:29	4–0 NYI
2nd	NYI	Clark Gillies (5) – pp	Stefan Persson (8)	15:41	5–0 NYI
2nd	NYI	Denis Potvin (5) – pp	Stefan Persson (9) and Mike Bossy (10)	17:25	6–0 NYI
3rd	PHI	Bobby Clarke (7)	Reggie Leach (6) and Mike Busniuk (4)	09:48	6–1 NYI
3rd	PHI	Mike Busniuk (1)	Mel Bridgman (8)	11:32	6–2 NYI
Penalty summary
Period	Team	Player	Penalty	Time	PIM
1st	NYI	Duane Sutter	Hooking	01:01	2:00
1st	NYI	Dave Langevin	Interference	04:11	2:00
1st	PHI	Bob Kelly	Tripping	06:54	2:00
1st	NYI	Clark Gillies	Tripping	09:32	2:00
1st	PHI	Rick MacLeish	Slashing	12:24	2:00
1st	PHI	Bob Dailey	Holding	12:56	2:00
1st	NYI	John Tonelli	Hooking	16:46	2:00
2nd	NYI	Gord Lane	Slashing	01:21	2:00
2nd	NYI	Bob Nystrom	Fighting – major	10:45	5:00
2nd	NYI	Stefan Persson	Roughing	10:45	2:00
2nd	PHI	Mike Busniuk	Fighting – major	10:45	5:00
2nd	NYI	Clark Gillies	Roughing	13:32	2:00
2nd	PHI	Behn Wilson	High-sticking	13:32	2:00
2nd	PHI	Ken Linseman	Slashing	14:15	2:00
2nd	NYI	Garry Howatt	Roughing	16:43	2:00
2nd	NYI	Garry Howatt	Misconduct	16:43	10:00
2nd	NYI	Gord Lane	Fighting – major	16:43	5:00
2nd	NYI	Gord Lane	Misconduct	16:43	10:00
2nd	PHI	Tom Gorence	Roughing	16:43	2:00
2nd	PHI	Tom Gorence	Misconduct	16:43	10:00
2nd	PHI	Jack McIlhargey	Fighting – major	16:43	5:00
2nd	PHI	Jack McIlhargey	Misconduct	16:43	10:00
2nd	PHI	Bill Barber	High-sticking	17:18	2:00
2nd	NYI	Bob Nystrom	High-sticking	19:23	2:00
2nd	NYI	Bob Nystrom	Roughing	19:23	2:00
2nd	PHI	Ken Linseman	Roughing	19:23	2:00
3rd	NYI	Duane Sutter	Roughing	19:31	2:00
3rd	PHI	Behn Wilson	Roughing	19:31	2:00

Shots by period
Team	1	2	3	Total
Philadelphia	9	8	15	32
New York	12	21	7	40

=== Game four ===
May 19	Philadelphia Flyers	2–5	New York Islanders	Nassau Coliseum	Recap

In game four, Clark Gillies recorded three points for New York, and the Islanders defeated the Flyers by a score of 5–2, giving them a commanding 3–1 lead in the series.

Scoring summary
Period	Team	Goal	Assist(s)	Time	Score
1st	NYI	Mike Bossy (9) – pp	Clark Gillies (8) and Bryan Trottier (15)	07:23	1–0 NYI
1st	NYI	Butch Goring (7)	Clark Gillies (9) and Duane Sutter (6)	13:06	2–0 NYI
2nd	PHI	John Paddock (1)	Rick MacLeish (8) and Behn Wilson (8)	01:35	2–1 NYI
3rd	NYI	Bryan Trottier (11)	Garry Howatt (1)	06:06	3–1 NYI
3rd	PHI	Ken Linseman (4)	Brian Propp (9) and Tom Gorence (3)	11:53	3–2 NYI
3rd	NYI	Bobby Nystrom (7)	Bob Bourne (9)	12:35	4–2 NYI
3rd	NYI	Clark Gillies (6)	Duane Sutter (7)	14:08	5–2 NYI
Penalty summary
Period	Team	Player	Penalty	Time	PIM
1st	NYI	Billy Smith	Slashing	03:47	2:00
1st	PHI	Tom Gorence	Holding	05:56	2:00
1st	NYI	Mike Bossy	Tripping	16:50	2:00
2nd	PHI	Jack McIlhargey	Interference	01:48	2:00
2nd	NYI	Denis Potvin	High-sticking	02:36	2:00
2nd	NYI	Dave Langevin	Fighting – major	03:06	5:00
2nd	PHI	Mel Bridgman	Fighting – major	03:06	5:00
2nd	NYI	Dave Langevin	Holding	13:45	2:00
2nd	PHI	Andre Dupont	Tripping	16:19	2:00
2nd	NYI	Stefan Persson	Hooking	17:55	2:00
3rd	PHI	Norm Barnes	Holding	00:44	2:00
3rd	PHI	Jack McIlhargey	Holding	09:16	2:00
3rd	PHI	Norm Barnes	Hooking	17:42	2:00

Shots by period
Team	1	2	3	Total
Philadelphia	13	11	12	36
New York	9	8	10	27

=== Game five ===
May 22	New York Islanders	3–6	Philadelphia Flyers	Spectrum	Recap

With Philadelphia facing elimination in game five, Brian Propp and Ken Linseman each recorded three points, giving the Flyers a 6–3 victory to send the series to a game six back in Uniondale.

Scoring summary
Period	Team	Goal	Assist(s)	Time	Score
1st	NYI	Stefan Persson (4) – pp	Mike Bossy (11)	10:58	1–0 NYI
2nd	PHI	Bobby Clarke (8)	Behn Wilson (9) and Reggie Leach (7)	01:45	1–1
2nd	PHI	Ken Linseman (4)	Brian Propp (9) and Tom Gorence (3)	11:53	2–1 PHI
2nd	NYI	Bryan Trottier (12)	Mike Bossy (12) and Stefan Persson (10)	16:16	2–2
2nd	PHI	Mike Busniuk (2)	Brian Propp (10) and Ken Linseman (14)	17:04	3–2 PHI
3rd	PHI	Rick MacLeish (9)	Mel Bridgman (9)	09:43	4–2 PHI
3rd	PHI	Brian Propp (4) – pp	Ken Linseman (15) and Paul Holmgren (8)	12:33	5–2 PHI
3rd	NYI	Stefan Persson (5)	Butch Goring (11) and Denis Potvin (13)	14:57	5–3 PHI
3rd	PHI	Paul Holmgren (10)	Ken Linseman (16)	17:26	6–3 PHI
Penalty summary
Period	Team	Player	Penalty	Time	PIM
1st	PHI	Paul Holmgren	High-sticking	02:48	2:00
1st	NYI	Clark Gillies	Interference	03:44	2:00
1st	NYI	Gord Lane	Slashing	09:03	2:00
1st	PHI	Paul Holmgren	Slashing	09:03	2:00
1st	PHI	Andre Dupont	Holding	10:40	2:00
1st	PHI	Brian Propp	Slashing	15:24	2:00
2nd	NYI	Stefan Persson	Interference	09:26	2:00
3rd	PHI	Jack McIlhargey	Hooking	01:43	2:00
3rd	NYI	Bob Lorimer	Hooking	02:36	2:00
3rd	PHI	Bob Kelly	Interference	10:03	2:00
3rd	NYI	Ken Morrow	Slashing	12:03	2:00
3rd	NYI	Ken Morrow	Unsportsmanlike conduct	12:03	2:00
3rd	PHI	Ken Linseman	High-sticking	13:00	2:00
3rd	NYI	Garry Howatt	Fighting – major	19:52	5:00
3rd	NYI	Billy Smith	Slashing – major	19:52	5:00
3rd	PHI	Bench (served by Brian Propp)	Delay of game	19:52	2:00
3rd	PHI	Mel Bridgman	Elbowing	19:52	2:00
3rd	PHI	Mel Bridgman	Roughing	19:52	2:00
3rd	PHI	Mel Bridgman	Fighting – major	19:52	5:00
3rd	PHI	Mel Bridgman	Misconduct	19:52	10:00

Shots by period
Team	1	2	3	Total
New York	10	15	13	38
Philadelphia	6	13	12	31

=== Game six ===
May 24	Philadelphia Flyers	4–5	OT	New York Islanders	Nassau Coliseum	Recap

In game six, Bob Nystrom scored the Cup winner in overtime, his fourth career overtime goal, at the time putting him alone behind Maurice Richard's six on the all-time overtime goal-scoring list. Ken Morrow joined the Islanders after winning the Olympic gold medal with the United States and added the Stanley Cup to cap a remarkable season, becoming the first player in NHL history to win a Stanley Cup and an Olympic gold medal in the same year.

The deciding game six was marred by one of the most infamous blown official calls in NHL playoff history. With the game tied 1–1, the Islanders Butch Goring picked up a drop pass from New York left wing Clark Gillies which had clearly gone back over the Flyers' defensive zone blue line into center ice. Linesman Leon Stickle waved the play as on-side, and Goring threaded a pass to right wing Duane Sutter who beat Philadelphia goalie Pete Peeters for a 2–1 New York lead. The Flyers argued vehemently to no avail. Everyone on both sides except Goring and Sutter appeared to relax as if play had been blown dead once the puck went over the blue line. Flyers captain Mel Bridgman stated the play changed the momentum of the game at a critical time even though the Flyers scored shortly afterwards to tie the score 2–2. Stickle admitted after the game that he had blown the call. Ultimately, it was the Flyers lack of discipline and the resulting Islander power play goals that were the difference in the series.

Bryan Trottier was awarded the Conn Smythe Trophy as the playoffs MVP, recording 29 points in 21 games.

Scoring summary
Period	Team	Goal	Assist(s)	Time	Score
1st	PHI	Reggie Leach (9) – pp	Rick MacLeish (5) and Bill Barber (9)	07:21	1–0 PHI
1st	NYI	Denis Potvin (6) – pp	Mike Bossy (13) and Bryan Trottier (16)	11:56	1–1
1st	NYI	Duane Sutter (3)	Clark Gillies (10) and Butch Goring (12)	14:08	2–1 NYI
1st	PHI	Brian Propp (5)	Paul Holmgren (9) and Ken Linseman (17)	18:58	2–2
2nd	NYI	Mike Bossy (10) – pp	Bob Bourne (10) and Bryan Trottier (17)	07:34	3–2 NYI
2nd	NYI	Bob Nystrom (8)	John Tonelli (8)	19:46	4–2 NYI
3rd	PHI	Bob Dailey (4)	Ken Linseman (18) and Paul Holmgren (10)	01:47	4–3 NYI
3rd	PHI	John Paddock (2)	Andre Dupont (4) and Rick MacLeish (6)	06:02	4–4
OT	NYI	Bob Nystrom (9)	Lorne Henning (4) and John Tonelli (9)	07:11	5–4 NYI
Penalty summary
Period	Team	Player	Penalty	Time	PIM
1st	NYI	Gord Lane	High-sticking	01:00	2:00
1st	PHI	Paul Holmgren	High-sticking	01:00	2:00
1st	PHI	Andre Dupont	High-sticking	02:24	2:00
1st	NYI	Bob Nystrom	Roughing	05:55	2:00
1st	NYI	Bob Nystrom	Fighting – major	05:55	5:00
1st	PHI	Bob Kelly	Fighting – major	05:55	5:00
1st	NYI	Denis Potvin	Cross-checking	06:29	2:00
1st	NYI	Bob Bourne	Delay of game	07:42	2:00
1st	PHI	Ken Linseman	Delay of game	07:42	2:00
1st	PHI	Paul Holmgren	Hooking	07:42	2:00
1st	PHI	Mike Busniuk	Holding	10:15	2:00
1st	NYI	Bob Nystrom	Roughing	15:18	2:00
1st	NYI	Bobby Nystrom	Misconduct	15:18	10:00
1st	PHI	Mel Bridgman	Roughing	15:18	2:00
1st	PHI	Mel Bridgman	Misconduct	15:18	10:00
1st	PHI	Andre Dupont	Holding	16:25	2:00
2nd	NYI	Garry Howatt	Roughing	03:15	2:00
2nd	PHI	Jimmy Watson	Roughing	03:15	2:00
2nd	PHI	Behn Wilson	Holding	06:39	2:00
2nd	PHI	Jack McIlhargey	Hooking	08:46	2:00
2nd	NYI	Mike Bossy	High-sticking	11:10	2:00
2nd	PHI	Mel Bridgman	Roughing	11:10	2:00
2nd	NYI	John Tonelli	Slashing	14:22	2:00
2nd	PHI	Andre Dupont	Interference	14:22	2:00
2nd	PHI	Andre Dupont	Roughing	14:22	2:00
2nd	NYI	Denis Potvin	Charging	15:09	2:00
2nd	PHI	Ken Linseman	Charging	15:09	2:00
3rd	NYI	Bob Nystrom	Holding	03:20	2:00
3rd	NYI	Clark Gillies	Slashing	08:09	2:00
3rd	NYI	Clark Gillies	Fighting – major	08:09	5:00
3rd	PHI	Paul Holmgren	Cross-checking	08:09	2:00
3rd	PHI	Paul Holmgren	Fighting – major	08:09	5:00
3rd	PHI	Ken Linseman	Roughing	09:21	2:00
OT	None				

Shots by period
Team	1	2	3	OT	Total
Philadelphia	6	6	11	2	25
New York	13	12	5	3	33

== Team rosters ==
=== New York Islanders ===
No.	Nat	Player	Pos	S/G	Age	Acquired	Birthplace
1	(Canada)	Chico Resch	G	L	31	1974	Moose Jaw, Saskatchewan
3	(Canada)	Jean Potvin	D	R	31	1979	Ottawa, Ontario
4	(Canada)	Bob Lorimer	D	L	26	1973	Toronto, Ontario
5	(Canada)	Denis Potvin (C)	D	L	26	1973	Vanier, Ontario
6	(United States)	Ken Morrow	D	R	23	1976	Davison, Michigan
7	(Sweden)	Stefan Persson	D	L	25	1974	Bjurholm, Sweden
8	(Canada)	Garry Howatt	LW	L	27	1972	Grand Centre, Alberta
9	(Canada)	Clark Gillies	LW	L	26	1974	Moose Jaw, Saskatchewan
10	(Canada)	Lorne Henning	C	L	28	1972	Melfort, Saskatchewan
11	(Canada)	Wayne Merrick	C	L	28	1977	Sarnia, Ontario
12	(Canada)	Duane Sutter	RW	R	20	1979	Viking, Alberta
14	(Canada)	Bob Bourne	LW	L	25	1974	Kindersley, Saskatchewan
16	(Canada)	Steve Tambellini	C	L	21	1978	Trail, British Columbia
17	(Canada)	Alex McKendry	RW	L	23	1978	Midland, Ontario
19	(Canada)	Bryan Trottier	C	L	23	1974	Val Marie, Saskatchewan
21	(Canada)	Butch Goring	C	L	30	1980	St. Boniface, Manitoba
22	(Canada)	Mike Bossy	RW	R	23	1977	Montreal, Quebec
23	(Sweden)	Bob Nystrom	RW	R	27	1972	Stockholm, Sweden
24	(Canada)	Gord Lane	D	L	27	1979	Brandon, Manitoba
26	(United States)	Dave Langevin	D	L	25	1974	Saint Paul, Minnesota
27	(Canada)	John Tonelli	LW	L	23	1977	Hamilton, Ontario
28	(Sweden)	Anders Kallur	RW	L	27	1979	Ludvika, Sweden
31	(Canada)	Billy Smith	G	L	29	1972	Perth, Ontario

=== Philadelphia Flyers ===
No.	Nat	Player	Pos	S/G	Age	Acquired	Birthplace
2	(Canada)	Bob Dailey	D	R	27	1977	Kingston, Ontario
3	(Canada)	Behn Wilson	D	L	21	1978	Toronto, Ontario
5	(Canada)	Frank Bathe	D	L	25	1977	Oshawa, Ontario
6	(Canada)	Andre Dupont	D	L	30	1972	Trois-Rivières, Quebec
7	(Canada)	Bill Barber	LW	L	27	1972	Callander, Ontario
9	(Canada)	Bob Kelly	LW	L	29	1970	Oakville, Ontario
10	(Canada)	Mel Bridgman (C)	C	L	25	1975	Trenton, Ontario
11	(Canada)	Dennis Ververgaert	RW	R	27	1978	Grimsby, Ontario
12	(Canada)	John Paddock	LW	R	25	1976	Oak River, Manitoba
14	(Canada)	Ken Linseman	C	L	21	1978	Kingston, Ontario
15	(Canada)	Al Hill	LW	L	25	1976	Nanaimo, British Columbia
16	(Canada)	Bobby Clarke	C	L	30	1969	Flin Flon, Manitoba
17	(United States)	Paul Holmgren	RW	R	24	1975	Saint Paul, Minnesota
19	(Canada)	Rick MacLeish	C	L	30	1970	Lindsay, Ontario
20	(Canada)	Jimmy Watson	D	L	27	1972	Smithers, British Columbia
21	(United States)	Gary Morrison	RW	R	24	1975	Farmington, Michigan
22	(United States)	Tom Gorence	RW	R	23	1977	Saint Paul, Minnesota
25	(Canada)	Norm Barnes	D	L	26	1973	Rexdale, Ontario
26	(Canada)	Brian Propp	LW	L	21	1979	Lanigan, Saskatchewan
27	(Canada)	Reggie Leach	RW	R	30	1974	Riverton, Manitoba
28	(Canada)	Mike Busniuk	D	R	28	1979	Thunder Bay, Ontario
29	(Canada)	Jack McIlhargey	D	L	28	1980	Edmonton, Alberta
31	(Canada)	Phil Myre	G	L	31	1979	Sainte-Anne-de-Bellevue, Quebec
33	(Canada)	Pete Peeters	G	L	22	1977	Edmonton, Alberta

== Stanley Cup engraving ==
The 1980 Stanley Cup was presented to Islanders captain Denis Potvin by NHL President John Ziegler following the Islanders 5–4 win over the Flyers in game six.

The following Islanders players and staff had their names engraved on the Stanley Cup

1979–80 New York Islanders

=== Players ===
Centres

- 10 Lorne Henning
- 11 Wayne Merrick
- 16 Steve Tambellini
- 19 Bryan Trottier
- 21 Robert Butch Goring

Wingers

- 8 Garry Howatt
- 9 Clark Gillies
- 12 Duane Sutter
- 14 Bob Bourne
- 17 Alex McKendry*
- 22 Mike Bossy
- 23 Bob Nystrom
- 27 John Tonelli
- 28 Anders Kallur

Defencemen

- 3 Jean Potvin*
- 4 Bob Lorimer
- 5 Denis Potvin (Captain)
- 6 Ken Morrow
- 7 Stefan Persson
- 24 Gord Lane
- 26 Dave Langevin

Goaltenders

- 1 Chico Resch
- 31 Billy Smith
- * Name engraved on Stanley Cup despite not officially qualifying.^{[A]}

=== Coaching and administrative staff ===
- John Pickett (Chairman/Owner)
- Bill Torrey (President/General Manager)
- Al Arbour (Head Coach), Bill MacMillan (Asst. Coach)
- Jim Devellano (Chief Scout), Gerry Ehman (Western Scout)
- Harry Boyd (Scout), Mario Saraceno (Scout)
- Ron Waske (Trainer), Jim Pickard (Asst. Trainer)

=== Stanley Cup engraving ===
- ^{^[A]} Two players had their names engraved on the Stanley Cup, even though they did not officially qualify.
  - #17 Alex McKendry (LW) – played 2 regular season and 6 playoff games (none in the playoffs)
  - #3 Jean Potvin (D) – played 32 regular season games, spending the whole season with the Islanders. He did not play in the playoffs.
- Ken Morrow became the first player to win the Olympic Gold (with Team United States), and Stanley Cup (with New York Islanders) in the same year.
- Al Arbour became the fourth person to win the Stanley Cup with four teams. Arbour won the Stanley Cup as a player with Detroit 1954, Chicago 1961, and Toronto 1962. 1964. The other three people to win cup with four teams are Jack Marshall, Harry (Happy) Holmes, and Tommy Gorman.
- Bryan Trottier was first Metis player to win the Stanley Cup
- Bob Nystrom, Anders Kallur and Stefan Persson were the first three Swedish born-trained players to win the Stanley Cup. Kallur and Persson were also the first European-trained players to win the Stanley Cup.

== Broadcasting ==
Bob Cole, Dan Kelly, and Jim Robson shared play-by-play duties for CBC's coverage. Cole did play-by-play for the first half of games one and two. Meanwhile, Kelly did play-by-play for the rest of games 1–5 (Kelly also called the overtime period of game one). Finally, Robson did play-by-play for the first half of games 3–4 and game six entirely, he also would've called game seven had there been one. In essence, this meant that Cole or Robson did play-by-play for the first period and the first half of the second period (except for game five in which the roles of Kelly and Robson were switched). Therefore, at the closest stoppage of play near the ten-minute mark of the second period, Cole or Robson handed off the call to Kelly for the rest of the game.

In the United States, the first five games were syndicated by the Hughes Television Network. Hughes used CBC's Hockey Night in Canada feeds for the American coverage. Game six was televised in the United States by the CBS network, as a special edition of its CBS Sports Spectacular anthology series. Dan Kelly did the play-by-play for CBS for the first and third periods as well as overtime. Meanwhile, Tim Ryan did play-by-play for the second period while Lou Nanne served as the color commentator throughout the game. Game six remains the last Stanley Cup Final game to be played in the afternoon (earlier than 5 p.m. local time). This would also be the last NHL game to air on U.S. network television until NBC televised the 1990 All-Star Game.

== Notes ==
Preceded by Montreal Canadiens; 1979	New York Islanders; Stanley Cup champions 1980	Succeeded by New York Islanders; 1981
