= 1979–80 Philadelphia Flyers season =

NHL hockey team season

1979–80 Philadelphia Flyers
- Campbell Conference champions
- Patrick Division champions
- Division: 1st Patrick
- Conference: 1st Campbell
- 1979–80 record: 48–12–20
- Home record: 27–5–8
- Road record: 21–7–12
- Goals for: 327 (2nd)
- Goals against: 254 (7th)

Team information
- General manager: Keith Allen
- Coach: Pat Quinn
- Captain: Mel Bridgman
- Alternate captains: None (Note: The alternate captain position was abolished from the 1975–76 season through the 1984–85 season.)
- Arena: Spectrum
- Average attendance: 17,077
- Minor league affiliates: Maine Mariners; Toledo Goaldiggers; Hampton Aces

Team leaders
- Goals: Reggie Leach (50)
- Assists: Bobby Clarke (57); Ken Linseman (57)
- Points: Ken Linseman (79)
- Penalty minutes: Paul Holmgren (267)
- Plus/minus: Jimmy Watson (+53)
- Wins: Pete Peeters (29)
- Goals against average: Pete Peeters (2.73)

The 1979–80 Philadelphia Flyers season was the franchise's 13th season in the National Hockey League (NHL). This team owns the longest unbeaten streak in major North American sports history in 35 consecutive games (25 wins, 10 ties) without a loss, from October 14 to January 6. The Flyers reached the Stanley Cup Final but lost in six games to the New York Islanders.

== Off-season ==
On August 10, 1979, Bobby Clarke was named a player-assistant coach. In order to become an assistant coach, Clarke was required to give up the captaincy due to NHL rules. Mel Bridgman was named Clarke's replacement as team captain on October 11.

== Regular season ==
The Flyers went undefeated for a North American professional sports record 35 straight games (25–0–10), a record that still stands to this day. In doing so, the Flyers wrapped up the Patrick Division title with 14 games to spare and the #1 overall seed in the playoffs.

=== Season standings ===
Patrick Division
	GP	W	L	T	GF	GA	Pts
**Philadelphia Flyers**	80	48	12	20	327	254	116
**New York Islanders**	80	39	28	13	281	247	91
**New York Rangers**	80	38	32	10	308	284	86
**Atlanta Flames**	80	35	32	13	282	269	83
Washington Capitals	80	27	40	13	261	293	67

Note: GP = Games played, W = Wins, L = Losses, T = Ties, Pts = Points, GF = Goals for, GA = Goals against
Note: Teams that qualified for the playoffs are highlighted in bold.

League standings
R		Div	GP	W	L	T	GF	GA	Pts
1	**p – Philadelphia Flyers**	PTK	80	48	12	20	327	254	116
2	**y – Buffalo Sabres**	ADM	80	47	17	16	318	201	110
3	**x – Montreal Canadiens**	NRS	80	47	20	13	328	240	107
4	**Boston Bruins**	ADM	80	46	21	13	310	234	105
5	**New York Islanders**	PTK	80	39	28	13	281	247	91
6	**Minnesota North Stars**	ADM	80	36	28	16	311	253	88
7	**x – Chicago Black Hawks**	SMY	80	34	27	19	241	250	87
8	**New York Rangers**	PTK	80	38	32	10	308	284	86
9	**Atlanta Flames**	PTK	80	35	32	13	282	269	83
10	**St. Louis Blues**	SMY	80	34	34	12	266	278	80
11	**Toronto Maple Leafs**	ADM	80	35	40	5	304	327	75
12	**Los Angeles Kings**	NRS	80	30	36	14	290	313	74
13	**Pittsburgh Penguins**	NRS	80	30	37	13	251	303	73
14	**Hartford Whalers**	NRS	80	27	34	19	303	312	73
15	**Vancouver Canucks**	SMY	80	27	37	16	256	281	70
16	**Edmonton Oilers**	SMY	80	28	39	13	301	322	69
17	Washington Capitals	PTK	80	27	40	13	261	293	67
18	Detroit Red Wings	NRS	80	26	43	11	268	306	63
19	Quebec Nordiques	ADM	80	25	44	11	248	313	61
20	Winnipeg Jets	SMY	80	20	49	11	214	314	51
21	Colorado Rockies	SMY	80	19	48	13	234	308	51

Divisions: ADM – Adams, NRS – Norris, PTK – Patrick, SMY – Smythe

bold – The top 16 teams in the league qualified for the playoffs, regardless of division or conference.
x – Won division; y – Won Conference (and division); p – Won Presidents' Trophy (and conference and division)

=== Record vs. opponents ===
Patrick Division record vs. opponents

==== Vs. Campbell Conference ====
**Vs. Patrick Division**

1979–80 NHL records
Team	**ATL**	**NYI**	**NYR**	**PHI**	**WSH**	**Total**
Atlanta	—	1–3	3–0–1	2–2	3–0–1	**9−5−2**
N.Y. Islanders	3–1	—	2–2	2–2	2–2	**9−7−0**
N.Y. Rangers	0–3–1	2–2	—	1–2–1	2–2	**5−9−2**
Philadelphia	2–2	2–2	2–1–1	—	2–0–2	**8−5−3**
Washington	0–3–1	2–2	2–2	0–2–2	—	**4−9−3**

**Vs. Smythe Division**

1979–80 NHL records
Team	**CHI**	**COL**	**EDM**	**STL**	**VAN**	**WIN**	**Total**
Atlanta	0−2−2	4−0	2−1−1	3−1	2−2	4−0	**15−6−3**
N.Y. Islanders	2−1−1	3−1	1−2−1	3−1	1−2−1	2−0−2	**12−7−5**
N.Y. Rangers	1−2−1	1−1−2	3−1	4−0	4−0	2−2	**15−6−3**
Philadelphia	2–0–2	2–1–1	3–0−1	2−0−2	3−1	4−0	**16−2−6**
Washington	2−2	1−1−2	1−3	2−2	3−1	3−0−1	**12−9−3**

**Vs. Wales Conference**

**Vs. Adams Division**

1979–80 NHL records
Team	**BOS**	**BUF**	**MIN**	**QUE**	**TOR**	**Total**
Atlanta	0–4	0–3–1	1–1–2	3–0–1	1–3	**5–11–4**
N.Y. Islanders	1–3	1–2–1	0–2–2	4–0	3–1	**9–8–3**
N.Y. Rangers	2–2	1–2–1	1–2–1	2–1–1	2–2	**8–9–3**
Philadelphia	1–1–2	3–0–1	3–1	3–0–1	1–1–2	**11–3–6**
Washington	1–2–1	0–4	0–3–1	1–1–2	1–3	**3–13–4**

**Vs. Norris Division**

1979–80 NHL records
Team	**DET**	**HFD**	**LAK**	**MTL**	**PIT**	**Total**
Atlanta	2–1–1	1–3	2–1–1	0–3–1	1–2–1	**6–10–4**
N.Y. Islanders	1–3	3–1	2–1–1	3–0–1	0–1–3	**9–6–5**
N.Y. Rangers	3–1	2–1–1	3–1	0–3–1	2–2	**10–8–2**
Philadelphia	3–0–1	2–0–2	4–0	1–2–1	3–0–1	**13–2–5**
Washington	1–2–1	2–1–1	3–1	1–2–1	1–3	**8–9–3**

== Playoffs ==
The Flyers' regular-season success continued into the playoffs, as the Flyers swept a young Wayne Gretzky and his Edmonton Oilers in the first round, then went on to get revenge against Fred Shero and his Rangers by beating them in five before disposing of Minnesota in five to lock up a berth in the Stanley Cup Final. Facing the Islanders for the Cup, the Flyers would ultimately lose in six games on Bob Nystrom's overtime Cup-winning goal. The result of the series was marred by controversy, as the Islanders were arguably offside on the play that resulted in their second goal in game six, but no call was made. Linesman Leon Stickle admitted after the game that he had blown the call.

== Schedule and results ==
=== Regular season ===
1979–80 regular season
October: 6–1–1 (home: 5–0–1; road: 1–1–0)

Game	Date	Score	Opponent	Decision	Attendance	Record	Points	Recap
1	October 11	5–2	New York Islanders	Myre	17,077	1–0–0	2	W
2	October 13	2–9	@ Atlanta Flames	Myre	13,358	1–1–0	2	L
3	October 14	4–3	Toronto Maple Leafs	Peeters	17,077	2–1–0	4	W
4	October 18	6–2	Atlanta Flames	Peeters	17,077	3–1–0	6	W
5	October 20	7–3	@ Detroit Red Wings	Myre	15,417	4–1–0	8	W
6	October 21	6–6	Montreal Canadiens	Myre	17,077	4–1–1	9	T
7	October 25	5–2	New York Rangers	Peeters	17,077	5–1–1	11	W
8	October 28	5–4	Detroit Red Wings	Myre	17,077	6–1–1	13	W

November: 11–0–2 (home: 6–0–0; road: 5–0–2)

Game	Date	Score	Opponent	Decision	Attendance	Record	Points	Recap
9	November 1	3–1	St. Louis Blues	Peeters	17,077	7–1–1	15	W
10	November 3	5–3	@ Montreal Canadiens	Myre	17,012	8–1–1	17	W
11	November 4	3–1	Buffalo Sabres	Peeters	17,077	9–1–1	19	W
12	November 7	4–3	@ Quebec Nordiques	Myre	11,899	10–1–1	21	W
13	November 10	5–2	@ New York Islanders	Peeters	14,995	11–1–1	23	W
14	November 11	5–4	Vancouver Canucks	Myre	17,077	12–1–1	25	W
15	November 15	5–3	Edmonton Oilers	Myre	17,077	13–1–1	27	W
16	November 17	3–3	@ St. Louis Blues	Peeters	12,723	13–1–2	28	T
17	November 21	6–4	@ Los Angeles Kings	Peeters	10,030	14–1–2	30	W
18	November 23	5–2	@ Vancouver Canucks	Myre	16,413	15–1–2	32	W
19	November 24	2–2	@ Edmonton Oilers	Peeters	15,423	15–1–3	33	T
20	November 27	6–2	Hartford Whalers	Myre	17,077	16–1–3	35	W
21	November 29	6–4	Minnesota North Stars	Peeters	17,077	17–1–3	37	W

December: 7–0–7 (home: 4–0–4; road: 3–0–3)

Game	Date	Score	Opponent	Decision	Attendance	Record	Points	Recap
22	December 1	4–4	@ Toronto Maple Leafs	Myre	16,485	17–1–4	38	T
23	December 2	4–4	Detroit Red Wings	Peeters	17,077	17–1–5	39	T
24	December 4	2–2	Boston Bruins	Myre	17,077	17–1–6	40	T
25	December 6	9–4	Los Angeles Kings	Peeters	17,077	18–1–6	42	W
26	December 9	4–4	Chicago Black Hawks	Myre	17,077	18–1–7	43	T
27	December 13	6–4	Quebec Nordiques	Peeters	17,077	19–1–7	45	W
28	December 15	3–2	Buffalo Sabres	Peeters	17,077	20–1–7	47	W
29	December 16	1–1	@ New York Rangers	Myre	17,404	20–1–8	48	T
30	December 20	1–1	Pittsburgh Penguins	Peeters	17,077	20–1–9	49	T
31	December 22	5–2	@ Boston Bruins	Myre	14,673	21–1–9	51	W
32	December 23	4–2	Hartford Whalers	Peeters	17,077	22–1–9	53	W
33	December 26	4–4	@ Hartford Whalers	Myre	7,627	22–1–10	54	T
34	December 28	5–3	@ Winnipeg Jets	Peeters	16,038	23–1–10	56	W
35	December 29	3–2	@ Colorado Rockies	Myre	16,452	24–1–10	58	W

January: 10–2–2 (home: 4–0–1; road: 6–2–1)

Game	Date	Score	Opponent	Decision	Attendance	Record	Points	Recap
36	January 4	5–3	@ New York Rangers	Myre	17,398	25–1–10	60	W
37	January 6	4–2	@ Buffalo Sabres	Peeters	16,433	26–1–10	62	W
38	January 7	1–7	@ Minnesota North Stars	Myre	15,962	26–2–10	62	L
39	January 10	5–4	Winnipeg Jets	Peeters	17,077	27–2–10	64	W
40	January 12	3–4	@ Montreal Canadiens	Myre	18,091	27–3–10	64	L
41	January 13	1–1	St. Louis Blues	Peeters	17,077	27–3–11	65	T
42	January 15	7–4	Washington Capitals	Myre	17,077	28–3–11	67	W
43	January 17	5–1	Chicago Black Hawks	Peeters	17,077	29–3–11	69	W
44	January 19	4–4	@ Washington Capitals	Myre	18,130	29–3–12	70	T
45	January 22	3–1	@ St. Louis Blues	Peeters	17,453	30–3–12	72	W
46	January 23	4–1	@ Chicago Black Hawks	Myre	17,160	31–3–12	74	W
47	January 25	5–4	@ Winnipeg Jets	Peeters	15,122	32–3–12	76	W
48	January 27	5–3	@ Edmonton Oilers	Peeters	15,423	33–3–12	78	W
49	January 31	4–2	Minnesota North Stars	St. Croix	17,077	34–3–12	80	W

February: 7–2–2 (home: 3–1–1; road: 4–1–1)

Game	Date	Score	Opponent	Decision	Attendance	Record	Points	Recap
50	February 2	4–0	@ Pittsburgh Penguins	Peeters	16,033	35–3–12	82	W
51	February 3	3–3	Boston Bruins	Myre	17,077	35–3–13	83	T
52	February 7	1–4	Vancouver Canucks	Myre	17,077	35–4–13	83	L
53	February 9	6–5	@ Detroit Red Wings	Peeters	19,353	36–4–13	85	W
54	February 10	5–2	Los Angeles Kings	Myre	17,077	37–4–13	87	W
55	February 14	5–1	Winnipeg Jets	Peeters	17,077	38–4–13	89	W
56	February 17	6–5	Pittsburgh Penguins	Myre	17,077	39–4–13	91	W
57	February 19	6–8	@ Colorado Rockies	Peeters	11,563	39–5–13	91	L
58	February 22	7–3	@ Vancouver Canucks	Myre	16,341	40–5–13	93	W
59	February 23	5–1	@ Los Angeles Kings	Peeters	16,005	41–5–13	95	W
60	February 27	1–1	@ Buffalo Sabres	Myre	16,433	41–5–14	96	T

March: 6–6–5 (home: 4–3–1; road: 2–3–4)

Game	Date	Score	Opponent	Decision	Attendance	Record	Points	Recap
61	March 1	3–3	@ Toronto Maple Leafs	Myre	16,485	41–5–15	97	T
62	March 2	1–5	Montreal Canadiens	Peeters	17,077	41–6–15	97	L
63	March 4	4–1	Colorado Rockies	Peeters	17,007	42–6–15	99	W
64	March 6	2–5	New York Islanders	Myre	17,077	42–7–15	99	L
65	March 8	6–2	@ Minnesota North Stars	Peeters	15,701	43–7–15	101	W
66	March 9	5–3	Edmonton Oilers	Myre	17,077	44–7–15	103	W
67	March 11	4–3	Pittsburgh Penguins	Peeters	9,972	45–7–15	105	W
68	March 12	6–6	@ Chicago Black Hawks	Myre	17,306	45–7–16	106	T
69	March 15	3–4	@ Atlanta Flames	Peeters	15,156	45–8–16	106	L
70	March 16	4–4	Colorado Rockies	Myre	17,077	45–8–17	107	T
71	March 20	0–3	Toronto Maple Leafs	Peeters	17,077	45–9–17	107	L
72	March 21	5–5	@ Hartford Whalers	Myre	14,460	45–9–18	108	T
73	March 23	2–7	@ Boston Bruins	Peeters	14,673	45–10–18	108	L
74	March 25	2–5	@ New York Islanders	Myre	14,995	45–11–18	108	L
75	March 27	5–2	Quebec Nordiques	Peeters	17,077	46–11–18	110	W
76	March 29	3–3	@ Washington Capitals	Myre	18,130	46–11–19	111	T
77	March 30	4–2	Atlanta Flames	Peeters	17,077	47–11–19	113	W

April: 1–1–1 (home: 1–1–0; road: 0–0–1)

Game	Date	Score	Opponent	Decision	Attendance	Record	Points	Recap
78	April 1	3–3	@ Quebec Nordiques	Myre	10,706	47–11–20	114	T
79	April 3	4–2	Washington Capitals	Peeters	17,077	48–11–20	116	W
80	April 6	3–8	New York Rangers	Myre	17,077	48–12–20	116	L

Legend: W Win (2 points) L Loss (0 points) T Tie (1 point)

=== Playoffs ===
1980 Stanley Cup playoffs
Preliminary Round vs. Edmonton Oilers - Flyers win 3–0

Game	Date	Score	Opponent	Decision	Attendance	Series	Recap
1	April 8	4–3 OT	Edmonton Oilers	Peeters	17,077	Flyers lead 1–0	W
2	April 9	5–1	Edmonton Oilers	Peeters	17,077	Flyers lead 2–0	W
3	April 11	3–2 OT	@ Edmonton Oilers	Myre	15,423	Flyers win 3–0	W

Quarterfinals vs. New York Rangers – Flyers win 4–1

Game	Date	Score	Opponent	Decision	Attendance	Series	Recap
1	April 16	2–1	New York Rangers	Peeters	17,077	Flyers lead 1–0	W
2	April 17	4–1	New York Rangers	Peeters	17,077	Flyers lead 2–0	W
3	April 19	3–0	@ New York Rangers	Peeters	17,374	Flyers lead 3–0	W
4	April 20	2–4	@ New York Rangers	Peeters	17,368	Flyers lead 3–1	L
5	April 22	3–1	New York Rangers	Peeters	17,077	Flyers win 4–1	W

Semifinals vs. Minnesota North Stars – Flyers win 4–1

Game	Date	Score	Opponent	Decision	Attendance	Series	Recap
1	April 29	5–6	Minnesota North Stars	Peeters	17,077	North Stars lead 1–0	L
2	May 1	7–0	Minnesota North Stars	Myre	17,077	Series tied 1–1	W
3	May 4	5–3	@ Minnesota North Stars	Myre	15,706	Flyers lead 2–1	W
4	May 6	3–2	@ Minnesota North Stars	Myre	15,650	Flyers lead 3–1	W
5	May 8	7–3	Minnesota North Stars	Myre	17,077	Flyers win 4–1	W

Stanley Cup Final vs. New York Islanders – Islanders win 4–2

Game	Date	Score	Opponent	Decision	Attendance	Series	Recap
1	May 13	3–4 OT	New York Islanders	Peeters	17,077	Islanders lead 1–0	L
2	May 15	8–3	New York Islanders	Peeters	17,077	Series tied 1–1	W
3	May 17	2–6	@ New York Islanders	Myre	14,995	Islanders lead 2–1	L
4	May 19	2–5	@ New York Islanders	Peeters	14,995	Islanders lead 3–1	L
5	May 22	6–3	New York Islanders	Peeters	17,077	Islanders lead 3–2	W
6	May 24	4–5 OT	@ New York Islanders	Peeters	14,995	Islanders win 4–2	L

Legend: W Win L Loss

== Player statistics ==
=== Scoring ===
- Position abbreviations: C = Center; D = Defense; G = Goaltender; LW = Left wing; RW = Right wing
- † = Joined team via a transaction (e.g., trade, waivers, signing) during the season. Stats reflect time with the Flyers only.
- ‡ = Left team via a transaction (e.g., trade, waivers, release) during the season. Stats reflect time with the Flyers only.

No.	Player	Pos	Regular season						Playoffs					
No.	Player	Pos	GP	G	A	Pts	+/-	PIM	GP	G	A	Pts	+/-	PIM
14	Ken Linseman	C	80	22	57	79	26	107	17	4	18	22	13	40
27	Reggie Leach	RW	76	50	26	76	40	28	19	9	7	16	8	6
26	Brian Propp	LW	80	34	41	75	45	54	19	5	10	15	12	29
7	Bill Barber	LW	79	40	32	72	39	17	19	12	9	21	10	23
16	Bobby Clarke	C	76	12	57	69	42	65	19	8	12	20	10	16
19	Rick MacLeish	LW	78	31	35	66	23	28	19	9	6	15	1	2
17	Paul Holmgren	RW	74	30	35	65	35	267	18	10	10	20	15	47
10	Mel Bridgman	C	74	16	31	47	13	136	19	2	9	11	8	70
2	Bob Dailey	D	61	13	26	39	30	71	19	4	13	17	9	22
9	Bob Kelly	LW	75	15	20	35	19	122	19	1	1	2	−1	38
3	Behn Wilson	D	61	9	25	34	21	212	19	4	9	13	6	66
11	Dennis Ververgaert	RW	58	14	17	31	9	24	2	0	0	0	−3	0
15	Al Hill	LW	61	16	10	26	14	53	19	3	5	8	3	19
25	Norm Barnes	D	59	4	21	25	23	59	10	0	0	0	−2	8
20	Jimmy Watson	D	71	5	18	23	53	51	15	0	4	4	16	20
22	Tom Gorence	RW	51	8	13	21	7	15	15	3	3	6	6	18
28 (Note: Busniuk wore number 21 in his first game.)	Mike Busniuk	D	71	2	18	20	39	93	19	2	4	6	17	23
12	John Paddock	LW	32	3	7	10	−4	36	3	2	0	2	0	0
6	Andre Dupont	D	58	1	7	8	37	107	19	0	4	4	21	50
5	Frank Bathe	D	47	0	7	7	7	111	1	0	0	0	−1	0
29	Jack McIlhargey†	D	26	0	4	4	7	95	9	0	0	0	1	25
23	Dave Gardner†	C	2	1	1	2	1	0	—	—	—	—	—	—
21	Gary Morrison	RW	3	0	2	2	0	0	5	0	1	1	2	2
21	Don Gillen	RW	1	1	0	1	1	0	—	—	—	—	—	—
34	Dennis Patterson	D	3	0	1	1	−1	0	—	—	—	—	—	—
8	Blake Wesley	D	2	0	1	1	−3	2	—	—	—	—	—	—
31	Phil Myre	G	41	0	0	0		37	6	0	0	0		0
33	Pete Peeters	G	40	0	0	0		28	13	0	0	0		2
30	Rick St. Croix	G	1	0	0	0		0	—	—	—	—	—	—

=== Goaltending ===
No.	Player	Regular season											Playoffs									
No.	Player	GP	GS	W	L	T	SA	GA	GAA	SV%	SO	TOI	GP	GS	W	L	SA	GA	GAA	SV%	SO	TOI
33	Pete Peeters	40	39	29	5	5	1061	108	2.73	.898	1	2,370	13	13	8	5	377	37	2.79	.902	1	797
31	Phil Myre	41	40	18	7	15	1127	141	3.58	.875	0	2,363	6	6	5	1	201	16	2.50	.920	1	384
30	Rick St. Croix	1	1	1	0	0	25	2	2.00	.920	0	60	—	—	—	—	—	—	—	—	—	—

== Awards and records ==
=== Awards ===
Type	Award/honor	Recipient	Ref
League (annual)	Jack Adams Award	Pat Quinn	
League (annual)	Lester Patrick Trophy (Note: Former Flyers coach Fred Shero also given award)	Bobby Clarke	
League (annual)	Lester Patrick Trophy	Ed Snider	
League (in-season)	NHL All-Star Game selection	Bill Barber	
League (in-season)	NHL All-Star Game selection	Norm Barnes	
League (in-season)	NHL All-Star Game selection	Reggie Leach (Note: Named All-Star Game Most Valuable Player)	
League (in-season)	NHL All-Star Game selection	Rick MacLeish	
League (in-season)	NHL All-Star Game selection	Pete Peeters	
League (in-season)	NHL All-Star Game selection	Brian Propp	
League (in-season)	NHL All-Star Game selection	Jimmy Watson	
Team	Barry Ashbee Trophy	Norm Barnes	
Team	Class Guy Award	Andre Dupont	

=== Records ===
The 1979–80 Philadelphia Flyers set the NHL record and North American pro sports record undefeated streak of 35 games, 25 wins and 10 ties, from October 14 to January 6. Likewise, they set team records for longest home undefeated streak at 26 games (October 11 to February 3) and longest road undefeated streak at 16 games (October 20 to January 6). Among other team records set during the regular season was the most powerplay goals allowed in a single game (6 on February 19) and the most penalties in a single game (38 on February 22). Their twelve losses and seven road losses on the season are the fewest in franchise history.

The Flyers set a number of franchise records during their semifinal playoff series with the Minnesota North Stars. On May 1, Bob Dailey tied a team record for most assists during a playoff game (4) and set the team record for points by a defenseman during a playoff game (5). Team records were also tied for most powerplay goals in a single game (4) and single period (3) during the same game. Bill Barber's three shorthanded goals during the series is tied for an NHL record, as is the same total for most shorthanded goals in a playoff year.

Another series mark which tied the NHL record was the 15 powerplay goals allowed against the New York Islanders during the 1980 Stanley Cup Final. Barber’s four game-winning goals is also tied for a team playoff year record and defenseman Andre Dupont’s +21 plus-minus rating is the team record. The Flyers nine home wins during the playoffs is tied for the most in team history.

=== Milestones ===
Milestone	Player	Date	Ref
First game	Brian Propp	October 11, 1979	
First game	Blake Wesley	October 13, 1979	
First game	Mike Busniuk	October 20, 1979	
First game	Don Gillen	January 27, 1980	
First game	Gary Morrison	February 17, 1980	
600th assist	Bobby Clarke	October 14, 1979	

== Transactions ==
The Flyers were involved in the following transactions from May 22, 1979, the day after the deciding game of the 1979 Stanley Cup Final, through May 24, 1980, the day of the deciding game of the 1980 Stanley Cup Final.

=== Trades ===
Date	Details		Ref
June 7, 1979	To Philadelphia Flyers: Phil Myre	To St. Louis Blues: Blake Dunlop; Rick Lapointe	
August 16, 1979	To Philadelphia Flyers: 3rd-round pick in 1981	To Washington Capitals: Wayne Stephenson	
September 4, 1979	To Philadelphia Flyers: Conditional 3rd- or 4th-round pick in 1981 (Note: Received 4th-round pick.)	To Detroit Red Wings: Dennis Sobchuk	
January 2, 1980	To Philadelphia Flyers: Jack McIlhargey	To Vancouver Canucks: cash	

=== Players acquired ===
Date	Player	Former team	Term	Via	Ref
June 9, 1979	Dennis Sobchuk	Edmonton Oilers		Reclamation (Note: Originally drafted by the Flyers in the fifth round of the 1974 NHL amateur draft, Sobchuk was reclaimed from Edmonton prior to the Expansion draft.)	
August 8, 1979	Dennis Patterson	Maine Mariners (AHL)		Free agency	
September 4, 1979	Fred Williams	Philadelphia Firebirds (AHL)		Free agency	
September 28, 1979	Greg Adams	Victoria Cougars (WHL)		Free agency	
October 10, 1979	Sam St. Laurent	Chicoutimi Saguenéens (QMJHL)		Free agency	
October 25, 1979	Tim Kerr	Kingston Canadians (OMJHL)		Free agency	
October 28, 1979	Marc-Andre Marchand	Hull Olympiques (QMJHL)	3-year	Free agency	
October 31, 1979	Dan Barber	Toronto Marlboros (OMJHL)		Free agency	
January 21, 1980	Dave Gardner	Binghamton Dusters (AHL)		Free agency	

=== Players lost ===
Date	Player	New team	Via	Ref
May 31, 1979	Bernie Parent		Retirement	
June 9, 1979	Serge Beaudoin	Atlanta Flames (Note: Since Beaudoin's 1978–79 WHA team, the Birmingham Bulls, was not one of the four teams accepted into the NHL, he became a free agent and signed with Atlanta on August 15.)	Reclamation	
June 9, 1979	Ron Chipperfield	Edmonton Oilers	Reclamation	
June 9, 1979	John McKenzie (Note: McKenzie was not reclaimed from the Hartford Whalers and retired.)		Reclamation	
June 9, 1979	Michel Parizeau (Note: Parizeau was not reclaimed from Edmonton and retired. He was named the head coach of the Syracuse Firebirds on September 5.)		Reclamation	
June 13, 1979	Jim Cunningham	Winnipeg Jets	Expansion draft	
June 13, 1979	Dave Hoyda	Winnipeg Jets	Expansion draft	
June 13, 1979	Bernie Johnston	Hartford Whalers	Expansion draft	
June 13, 1979	M. F. Schurman	Hartford Whalers	Expansion draft	

=== Signings ===
Date	Player	Term	Ref
June 18, 1979	Frank Bathe	multi-year	
September 4, 1979	Lindsay Carson		
September 4, 1979	Don Gillen		
September 4, 1979	Brian Propp	multi-year	
September 4, 1979	Blake Wesley		
September 4, 1979	Gord Williams		

== Draft picks ==
Philadelphia's picks at the 1979 NHL entry draft, which was held at the Queen Elizabeth Hotel in Montreal, on August 9, 1979.

Round	Pick	Player	Position	Nationality	Team (league)	Notes
1	14	Brian Propp	Left wing	Canada	Brandon Wheat Kings (WHL)	
2	22	Blake Wesley	Defense	Canada	Portland Winter Hawks (WHL)	(Note: The Flyers traded the 1978 second-round pick acquired from the Los Angeles Kings in the 1976 Dave Schultz trade to the Colorado Rockies for the Rockies' 1979 second-round pick, 22nd overall, on June 15, 1978.)
2	35	Pelle Lindbergh	Goaltender	Sweden	AIK (Elitserien)	
3	56	Lindsay Carson	Center	Canada	Billings Bighorns (WHL)	
4	77	Don Gillen	Right wing	Canada	Brandon Wheat Kings (WHL)	
5	98	Thomas Eriksson	Defense	Sweden	Djurgardens IF (Elitserien)	
6	119	Gord Williams	Forward	Canada	Lethbridge Broncos (WHL)	

== Farm teams ==
The Flyers were affiliated with the Maine Mariners of the AHL, the Toledo Goaldiggers of the IHL, and the Hampton Aces of the Eastern Hockey League.
