= Paddock (surname) =

Paddock is an English surname. Notable people with the surname include:

- Algernon Paddock (1830–1897), American politician
- Benjamin G. Paddock (1827–1900), American politician
- Benjamin H. Paddock (1828–1886), American Episcopal bishop
- Benjamin Hoskins Paddock (1926–1998), American bank robber and con man who was on the FBI Ten Most Wanted Fugitives list from 1969 to 1977
- Cam Paddock (born 1983), Canadian ice hockey player
- Charley Paddock (1900–1943), American athlete and actor
- Daniel H. Paddock (1852–1905), American politician
- Del Paddock (1887–1952), American baseball player
- Francis Paddock (1814–1889), American frontier doctor
- George A. Paddock (1885–1964), American politician
- John Paddock (footballer) (1876–1965), British football player
- John Paddock (born 1954), Canadian hockey coach
- Lin Paddock, Canadian politician
- Ray Paddock (1877–1953), American politician and farmer
- Richard B. Paddock (1859–1901), American cavalry officer
- Stephen Paddock (1953–2017), American mass murderer, perpetrator of the 2017 Las Vegas shooting
- Tom Paddock (c. 1822–1863), British boxing champion
- William Paddock (1832–1891), American politician

== See also ==
- Paddick
