= Benjamin Paddock =

Benjamin Paddock may refer to:

- Benjamin Henry Paddock (1828–1891), bishop of Massachusetts in the Episcopal Church
- Benjamin Hoskins Paddock (1926–1998), American bank robber and con man
- Benjamin G. Paddock (1827–1900), American businessman and politician

== See also ==
- Paddock (surname)
