= Padwick =

Padwick is a surname, and may refer to:

- Constance E. Padwick (1886–1968), English missionary
- E. W. Padwick (1923–2010), bibliographer of cricket
- Henry Padwick (1805–1879), English solicitor, figure of the horse racing world and moneylender
- Philip Hugh Padwick (1876–1958), English painter
- William Padwick, figure in the development of Hayling Island
