= Paddick =

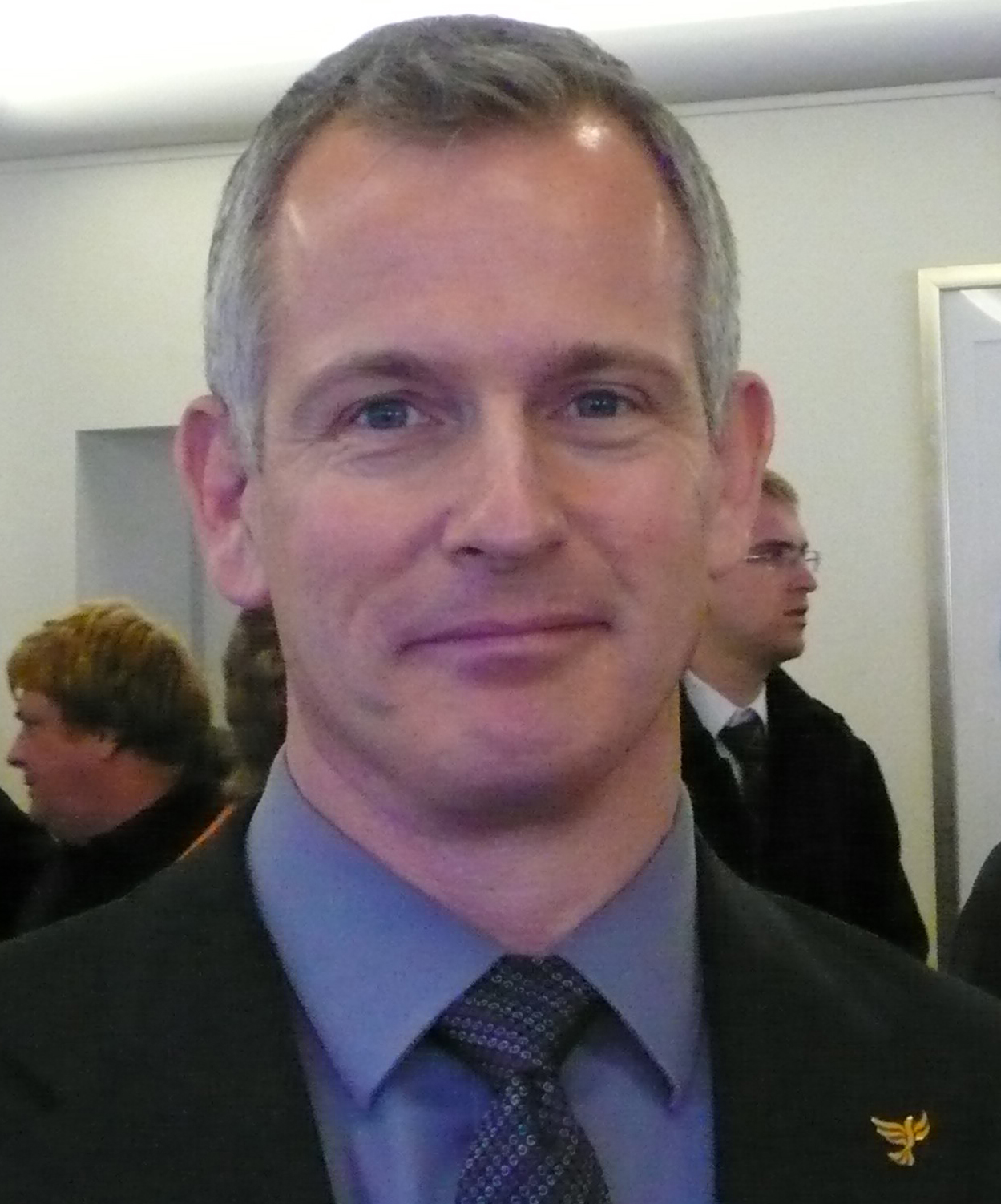
- Brian Paddick, Liberal Democrat candidate for Mayor of London in 2008
- Pronunciation: \PA-dick\

Origin
- Region of origin: England

Other names
- Variant forms: Paddock, Parrock, Padwick

Paddick is a surname of English origin, later spreading to other English language countries. There are several origin theories: all may be true as there are distinct groupings of Paddicks across England.

The first group, from the Somerset, Dorset and Bristol area, is thought to derive from the Old English paddock meaning an enclosed or fenced area of land.

The second group comes from the English Midlands, particularly Shropshire and Staffordshire, though also through time from Birmingham and Lancashire. This name, although most commonly written as Paddock rather than Paddick, was originally written as Parrock and derives from the same etymology as the word "park". The vast majority of people with the last name Paddick or Paddock in England are descended from this group.

The third group is concentrated around the South East England coast, particularly in the counties of Hampshire and Sussex, and this group is a variant of the surname Padwick.

The following notable people have or had the surname Paddick:

- Brian Paddick (born 1958), former British police commander and candidate in 2008 for Mayor of London
- Hugh Paddick (1915–2000), British actor
- John Paddick (born 1943), British athlete
- Paul Paddick (born 1967), Australian children's television presenter

== See also ==
- Paddock
