= Garry Howatt =

Canadian ice hockey player

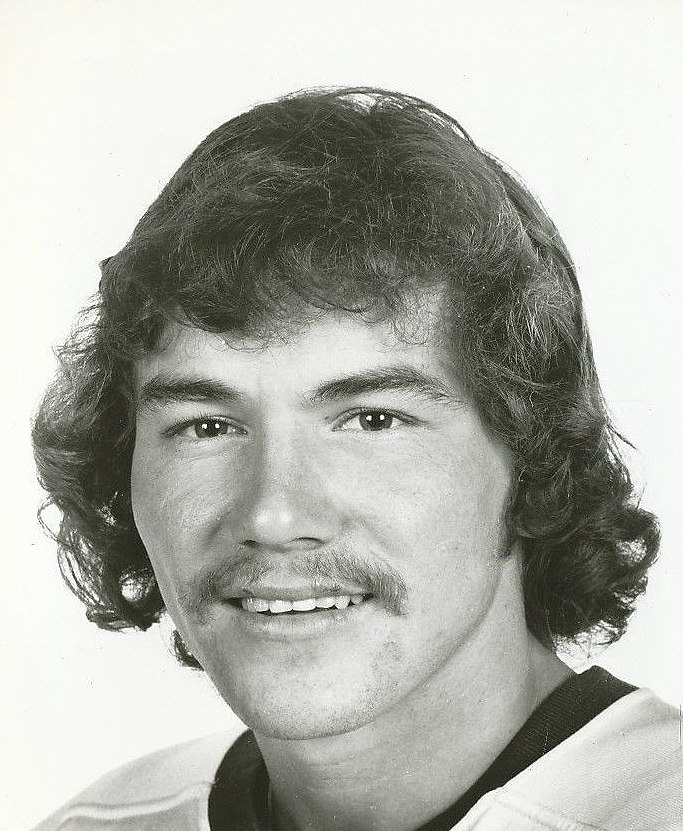
- Born: September 26, 1952 (age 74) Grand Centre, Alberta, Canada
- Height: 5 ft 9 in (175 cm)
- Weight: 175 lb (79 kg; 12 st 7 lb)
- Position: Left wing
- Shot: Left
- Played for: New York Islanders; Hartford Whalers; New Jersey Devils
- NHL draft: 144th overall, 1972; New York Islanders
- Playing career: 1972–1984

Garry Robert Charles Howatt (born September 26, 1952) is a Canadian former ice hockey forward. He played in the National Hockey League with the New York Islanders, Hartford Whalers, and New Jersey Devils between 1972 and 1984. With the Islanders Howatt won the Stanley Cup in 1980 and 1981. Howatt was known for his toughness and, due to his small size, had the nickname "Toy Tiger."

== Career ==
=== Junior and AHL ===
Born in Grand Centre (now part of Cold Lake), Alberta, Howatt played one season in the WCHL with the Flin Flon Bombers in 1971-72. He amassed 79 points in 60 games. That year he was drafted into the NHL by the New York Islanders at the 1972 NHL Amateur Draft. The following year he played with the New Haven Nighthawks of the American Hockey League, scoring 49 points in 65 games.

=== NHL ===
Howatt started his National Hockey League career with the New York Islanders in 1972.

Howatt enjoyed his greatest popularity with the Islanders, remaining on the team from their first season, through their formative years of steady improvement, right through to their first two Stanley Cup championships, in 1980 and 1981. Howatt, known along with teammate Bobby Nystrom as a member of the "Dynamic Duo", was a fan favourite admired for his scrappy, energetic style of play. For this reason, Islander fans established a Howatt-Nystrom booster club, called the "Dynamic Duo Fan Club", which was active throughout the 1970s.

When he left the Islanders in 1981, Howatt held the Islanders' career penalty-minutes record (1,466) and career playoffs penalty-minutes record (279). With the Hartford Whalers, Howatt scored a career-high 50 points and was offered a long-term contract and the team's captaincy. However, in his words, "bad advice from some former teammates" led him to request a trade to the New Jersey Devils, and was traded with Rick Meagher for Merlin Malinowski and the rights to Scott Fusco. After squabbling with Devils' management, he played only sporadically before ending his career with the Maine Mariners of the American Hockey League (AHL), where he helped them win a Calder Cup as their captain.

On January 15, 1983, Howatt, as a member of the Devils, and Mickey Volcan, as a member of the Whalers, became the only active players to officiate an NHL game, when a snowstorm prevented referee Ron Fournier and linesman Ron Asselstine from reaching the Hartford Civic Center for a game between the two teams. The two players stepped down after the first period once the officials arrived. He retired after the 1983–84 NHL season.

== Personal life ==
Howatt has epilepsy and was recognized by the epilepsy community for his grittiness by being awarded the National Epileptic Foundation Man of the Year for 1974. He later resided in New Jersey, where he owned and operated his own business, Mt. Freedom Golf, which he sold in 2010. Howatt now lives in Arizona with his wife and is still active playing hockey with NHL alumni. He is also active in rodeos throughout Arizona, participating in team roping competitions.

=== Regular season and playoffs ===
| | | | Regular season | | | | | Playoffs |
| Season | Team | League | GP | G | A | Pts | PIM | GP | G | A | Pts | PIM |
|---|---|---|---|---|---|---|---|---|---|---|---|---|
| 1971–72 | Victoria Cougars | WCHL | 24 | 5 | 15 | 20 | 36 | — | — | — | — | — |
| 1971–72 | Flin Flon Bombers | WCHL | 36 | 24 | 35 | 59 | 109 | 7 | 4 | 1 | 5 | 30 |
| 1972–73 | New York Islanders | NHL | 8 | 0 | 1 | 1 | 18 | — | — | — | — | — |
| 1972–73 | New Haven Nighthawks | AHL | 65 | 22 | 27 | 49 | 157 | — | — | — | — | — |
| 1973–74 | New York Islanders | NHL | 78 | 6 | 11 | 17 | 204 | — | — | — | — | — |
| 1974–75 | New York Islanders | NHL | 77 | 18 | 30 | 48 | 121 | 17 | 3 | 3 | 6 | 59 |
| 1975–76 | New York Islanders | NHL | 80 | 21 | 13 | 34 | 197 | 13 | 5 | 5 | 10 | 23 |
| 1976–77 | New York Islanders | NHL | 70 | 13 | 15 | 28 | 182 | 12 | 1 | 1 | 2 | 28 |
| 1977–78 | New York Islanders | NHL | 61 | 7 | 12 | 19 | 146 | 7 | 0 | 1 | 1 | 62 |
| 1978–79 | New York Islanders | NHL | 75 | 16 | 12 | 28 | 205 | 9 | 0 | 1 | 1 | 18 |
| 1979–80 | New York Islanders | NHL | 77 | 8 | 11 | 19 | 219 | 21 | 3 | 1 | 4 | 84 |
| 1980–81 | New York Islanders | NHL | 70 | 4 | 15 | 19 | 174 | 8 | 0 | 2 | 2 | 15 |
| 1981–82 | Hartford Whalers | NHL | 80 | 18 | 32 | 50 | 242 | — | — | — | — | — |
| 1982–83 | New Jersey Devils | NHL | 38 | 1 | 4 | 5 | 114 | — | — | — | — | — |
| 1982–83 | Wichita Wind | CHL | 11 | 0 | 5 | 5 | 4 | — | — | — | — | — |
| 1983–84 | New Jersey Devils | NHL | 6 | 0 | 0 | 0 | 14 | — | — | — | — | — |
| 1983–84 | Maine Mariners | AHL | 63 | 12 | 20 | 32 | 124 | 17 | 4 | 7 | 11 | 46 |
| NHL totals | | | 720 | 112 | 156 | 268 | 1836 | 87 | 12 | 14 | 26 | 289 |
