= Doug Lecuyer =

Canadian ice hockey player and golfer

- Born: March 10, 1958 (age 67) Wainwright, Alberta, Canada
- Height: 5 ft 9 in (175 cm)
- Weight: 180 lb (82 kg; 12 st 12 lb)
- Position: Left wing
- Shot: Left
- Played for: Chicago Black Hawks; Winnipeg Jets; Pittsburgh Penguins
- NHL draft: 29th overall, 1978; Chicago Black Hawks
- Playing career: 1978–1983

Douglas J. Lecuyer (born March 10, 1958) is a Canadian former professional ice hockey forward who played 126 games in the National Hockey League for the Chicago Black Hawks, Winnipeg Jets, and Pittsburgh Penguins.

Lecuyer was born in Wainwright, Alberta. He played junior in the Western Hockey League from 1973 until 1978. He became a professional the following season with the Chicago Blackhawks organization.

Having been a talented junior golfer, after retiring from hockey Lecuyer returned to the sport and pursued a career as a professional golfer.

== Career statistics ==
=== Regular season and playoffs ===
| | | | Regular season | | | | | Playoffs |
| Season | Team | League | GP | G | A | Pts | PIM | GP | G | A | Pts | PIM |
|---|---|---|---|---|---|---|---|---|---|---|---|---|
| 1973–74 | Edmonton Oil Kings | WCHL | 54 | 15 | 22 | 37 | 130 | — | — | — | — | — |
| 1974–75 | Edmonton Oil Kings | WCHL | 67 | 33 | 39 | 72 | 284 | — | — | — | — | — |
| 1975–76 | Edmonton Oil Kings | WCHL | 61 | 40 | 32 | 72 | 335 | 5 | 2 | 2 | 4 | 52 |
| 1976–77 | Portland Winter Hawks | WCHL | 5 | 6 | 4 | 10 | 10 | — | — | — | — | — |
| 1976–77 | Calgary Centennials | WCHL | 50 | 40 | 42 | 82 | 216 | — | — | — | — | — |
| 1977–78 | Portland Winter Hawks | WCHL | 65 | 43 | 46 | 89 | 362 | 6 | 2 | 4 | 6 | 43 |
| 1978–79 | Chicago Black Hawks | NHL | 2 | 1 | 0 | 1 | 0 | — | — | — | — | — |
| 1978–79 | New Brunswick Hawks | AHL | 43 | 18 | 29 | 47 | 125 | — | — | — | — | — |
| 1979–80 | Chicago Black Hawks | NHL | 53 | 3 | 10 | 13 | 59 | 7 | 4 | 0 | 4 | 15 |
| 1979–80 | New Brunswick Hawks | AHL | 5 | 4 | 3 | 7 | 12 | — | — | — | — | — |
| 1979–80 | Dallas Black Hawks | CHL | 5 | 1 | 0 | 1 | 2 | — | — | — | — | — |
| 1980–81 | Chicago Black Hawks | NHL | 14 | 0 | 0 | 0 | 41 | — | — | — | — | — |
| 1980–81 | Winnipeg Jets | NHL | 45 | 6 | 17 | 23 | 66 | — | — | — | — | — |
| 1981–82 | Tulsa Oilers | CHL | 69 | 30 | 38 | 68 | 114 | 3 | 0 | 1 | 1 | 8 |
| 1982–83 | Baltimore Skipjacks | AHL | 63 | 17 | 33 | 50 | 56 | — | — | — | — | — |
| 1982–83 | Pittsburgh Penguins | NHL | 12 | 1 | 4 | 5 | 12 | — | — | — | — | — |
| NHL totals | | | 126 | 11 | 31 | 42 | 178 | 7 | 4 | 0 | 4 | 15 |

== Professional golf tournament wins ==
- 1983 Canadian Assistant Professionals Championship
- 1984 PGA of Alberta Championship
- 1985 PGA of Alberta Championship
- 1986 PGA of Alberta Championship
