= Philip Hugh Padwick =

English painter

Philip Hugh Padwick (ROI, RBA; 1876–1958) was an English painter noted for his oil landscapes. His work was impressionistic and fluid, utilising bold colours.

Padwick was a member of the Royal Society of British Artists (RBA). In 1929, he exhibited at the Royal Academy of Arts with two pieces, Harbour Scene and Scene in Yorkshire.

Padwick's work has been exhibited in London at the Barbizon House, the Chenil Gallery, the Fine Art Society, the International Society, the New English Art Club, the Royal Society of British Artists, the Ridley Gallery, the Royal Institute of Oil Painters. He has also been exhibited at the Royal Hibernian Academy in Dublin, the Royal Scottish Academy in Edinburgh, the Royal Cambrian Academy of Art in Conwy, Wales, and the Walker Art Gallery in Liverpool.

There are currently 33 of Padwick's paintings on display in art galleries across the UK.

Philip Padwick died in 1958 at Midhurst, West Sussex, aged 82.
