= Benjamin G. Paddock =

American politician

Benjamin Greene Paddock (November 10, 1827 – March 4, 1900) was an American businessman and politician.

Born in Vienna, Oneida County, New York, Paddock went to public school in Whitesboro, New York. In 1858, Paddock moved to the town of Ironton, Sauk County, Wisconsin. Paddock was a merchant. He served as postmaster for Ironton and served as a justice of the peace. During 1871 to 1872, Paddock served as sheriff for Sauk County. From 1873 to 1876, Paddock served a commissioner of the poor for Sauk County. In 1876, Paddock moved to the town of La Valle, in Sauk County. From 1889 to 1891, Paddock served in the Wisconsin State Assembly and was a Republican. Paddock served postmaster for the town of La Valle until his death. Paddock died at his home in La Valle, Wisconsin.
