= Tom Gorence =

American ice hockey player (born 1957)

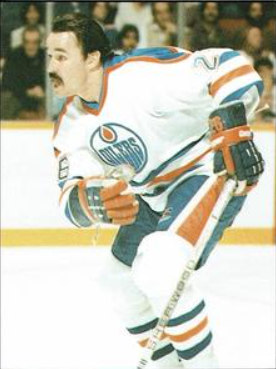
- Born: March 11, 1957 (age 69) Saint Paul, Minnesota, U.S.
- Height: 6 ft 0 in (183 cm)
- Weight: 190 lb (86 kg; 13 st 8 lb)
- Position: Right wing
- Shot: Right
- Played for: Philadelphia Flyers; Edmonton Oilers
- National team: United States
- NHL draft: 35th overall, 1977; Philadelphia Flyers
- WHA draft: 13th overall, 1977; Calgary Cowboys
- Playing career: 1977–1986

Thomas John Gorence (born March 11, 1957) is an American former professional ice hockey right winger who played six seasons in the National Hockey League (NHL) for the Philadelphia Flyers and Edmonton Oilers. He featured in the 1980 Stanley Cup Finals with the Flyers.

== Playing career ==
A former University of Minnesota hockey player, Gorence played pro hockey for the Philadelphia Flyers (who drafted him with the 35th pick in the 1977 NHL entry draft) and Edmonton Oilers between 1978 and 1983. He was also a member of the United States national team at the 1981 Canada Cup and 1982 Ice Hockey World Championship tournaments.

== Career statistics ==
=== Regular season and playoffs ===
			Regular season					Playoffs
Season	Team	League	GP	G	A	Pts	PIM	GP	G	A	Pts	PIM
1975–76	University of Minnesota	WCHA	40	16	10	26	24	—	—	—	—	—
1976–77	University of Minnesota	WCHA	29	18	19	37	44	—	—	—	—	—
1977–78	Maine Mariners	AHL	79	28	25	53	23	12	8	4	12	19
1978–79	Maine Mariners	AHL	31	11	13	24	23	—	—	—	—	—
1978–79	Philadelphia Flyers	NHL	42	13	6	19	10	7	3	1	4	0
1979–80	Philadelphia Flyers	NHL	51	8	13	21	15	15	3	3	6	18
1980–81	Philadelphia Flyers	NHL	79	24	18	42	46	12	3	2	5	29
1981–82	Philadelphia Flyers	NHL	66	5	8	13	8	3	0	0	0	0
1982–83	Philadelphia Flyers	NHL	53	7	7	14	10	—	—	—	—	—
1982–83	Maine Mariners	AHL	10	0	5	5	2	17	9	3	12	12
1983–84	Edmonton Oilers	NHL	12	1	1	2	0	—	—	—	—	—
1983–84	Moncton Alpines	AHL	53	13	14	27	17	—	—	—	—	—
1984–85	Maine Mariners	AHL	12	3	1	4	37	10	2	3	5	0
1985–86	Hershey Bears	AHL	1	0	0	0	0	—	—	—	—	—
NHL totals			303	58	53	111	89	37	9	6	15	47

=== International ===
Year	Team	Event	GP	G	A	Pts	PIM
1981	United States	CC	6	1	1	2	2
1982	United States	WC	7	1	1	2	2
Senior totals			13	2	2	4	4
