= John Paddock =

Canadian ice hockey player and coach

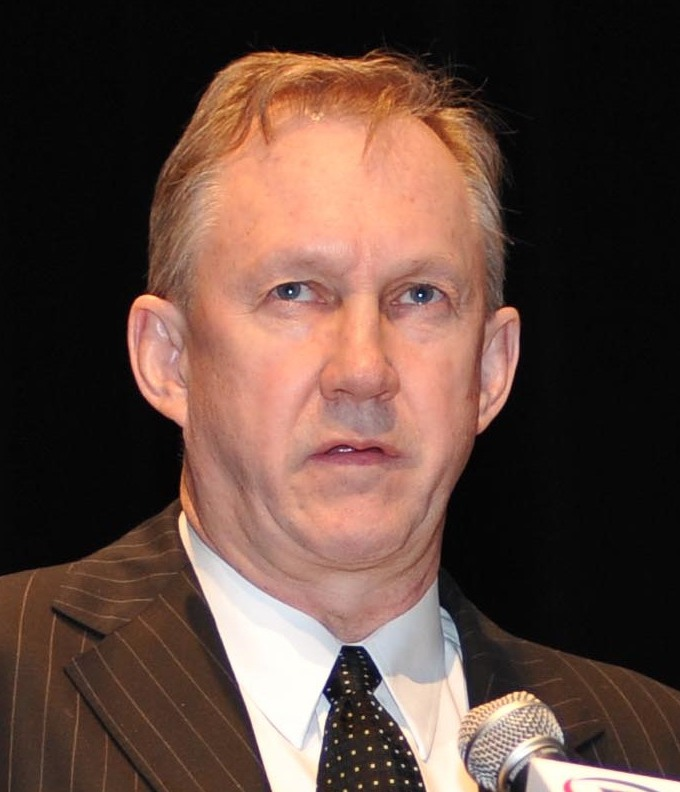
- Paddock in 2010
- Born: June 9, 1954 (age 72) Oak River, Manitoba, Canada
- Height: 6 ft 3 in (191 cm)
- Weight: 190 lb (86 kg; 13 st 8 lb)
- Position: Right wing
- Shot: Right
- Played for: Washington Capitals; Philadelphia Flyers; Quebec Nordiques
- National team: Canada
- NHL draft: 37th overall, 1974; Washington Capitals
- WHA draft: 57th overall, 1974; Minnesota Fighting Saints
- Playing career: 1975–1983

Alvin John Paddock (born June 9, 1954) is a Canadian professional ice hockey coach and former player, currently the senior vice-president of hockey operations of the Regina Pats of the Western Hockey League (WHL). He is a former head coach of the Winnipeg Jets and Ottawa Senators. During his long career in the American Hockey League (AHL), he won five Calder Cup championships (two as a player, three as a head coach) and was inducted into the AHL's Hall of Fame in 2010.

== Playing career ==
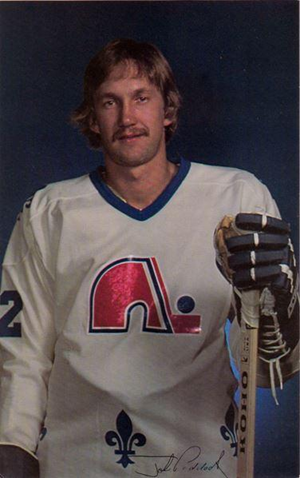
1980 postcard of Paddock for Quebec Nordiques

Selected in the 1974 NHL entry draft by the Washington Capitals, Paddock only played eight games with the Capitals before he was traded to the Philadelphia Flyers. He played a memorable role in the 1980 Stanley Cup Finals against the New York Islanders, scoring the tying goal to send Game 6 of the Finals into overtime. However, Bob Nystrom scored at 7:11 of overtime to win the Stanley Cup for New York.

Throughout his career, Paddock had a difficult time trying to crack the lineup on an NHL team. Playing primarily in the minors, in particular the Maine Mariners of the American Hockey League (AHL), Paddock retired as a player in 1983–84 and moved to coaching.

== Coaching career ==
Paddock began coaching with the Maine Mariners of the AHL, winning the Calder Cup in his first year. He later coached in Hershey, Pennsylvania, winning the Calder Cup as coach of the 1988 AHL champion Hershey Bears. He was named head coach of the NHL's Winnipeg Jets in 1991, becoming the first Manitoba-born coach of the franchise. Later, he would also become its general manager and would relinquish his coaching duties in early 1994. He remained as the general manager—even after the Jets relocated to Phoenix, Arizona, to become the Phoenix Coyotes—until December 1996.

After two years as a scout with the New York Rangers, Paddock would return to head coaching in 1999, primarily in the AHL. He was head coach of the Hartford Wolf Pack from 1999 to 2002, winning his third AHL Championship as a coach in the 1999–2000 season.

Paddock joined the Ottawa Senators organization in 2002 as coach of their AHL affiliate, the Binghamton Senators, from 2002 to 2005. In 2002, he was promoted to the assistant coach of the Ottawa Senators. When Ottawa head coach Bryan Murray was promoted to general manager in July 2007 following the team's Stanley Cup Finals appearance, Paddock became head coach of Ottawa, the sixth head coach in modern Senators' history.

Paddock's term with Ottawa started extremely well. In the first 17 games of the season, the club set records for the best start in NHL history, winning 15 of their first 17 games. In the 2007–08 season, Paddock was the head coach of the Eastern Conference team for the All-Star game as Ottawa had the best record in the East. However, on February 27, 2008, Murray fired Paddock after several lackluster performances by the team in February, and a generally poor record since the first 17 games of the year. Murray would serve as head coach for the remainder of the 2007–08 season and playoffs, with a 7–9–2 record. The Senators were eliminated in the first round of the playoffs.

In August 2008, Paddock returned to the Philadelphia Flyers organization, hired to be head coach of their AHL affiliate, the Philadelphia Phantoms. On July 9, 2009, he was appointed assistant general manager of the Flyers. On June 18, 2014, Paddock was released by the Philadelphia Flyers organization.

On August 6, 2014, Paddock was hired by the Western Hockey League (WHL)'s Regina Pats as head coach and senior vice-president of hockey operations. Following his first season behind the Pats' bench, Paddock was named the Dunc McCallum Trophy winner as the WHL's 2015 Coach of the Year.

On June 28, 2018, he stepped down as head coach but remained VP of hockey operations and GM for The Pats.

== Career statistics ==
=== Regular season and playoffs ===
			Regular season					Playoffs
Season	Team	League	GP	G	A	Pts	PIM	GP	G	A	Pts	PIM
1972–73	Brandon Wheat Kings	WCHL	11	3	2	5	6	6	2	2	4	4
1973–74	Brandon Wheat Kings	WCHL	68	34	49	83	228	—	—	—	—	—
1974–75	Richmond Robins	AHL	72	26	22	48	206	7	5	3	8	38
1975–76	Richmond Robins	AHL	42	11	14	25	98	8	0	3	3	5
1975–76	Washington Capitals	NHL	8	1	1	2	12	—	—	—	—	—
1976–77	Springfield Indians	AHL	61	13	16	29	106	—	—	—	—	—
1976–77	Philadelphia Flyers	NHL	5	0	0	0	9	—	—	—	—	—
1977–78	Maine Mariners	AHL	61	8	12	20	152	8	0	0	0	25
1978–79	Maine Mariners	AHL	79	30	37	67	275	10	9	1	10	13
1979–80	Philadelphia Flyers	NHL	32	3	7	10	36	3	2	0	2	48
1980–81	Maine Mariners	AHL	22	8	7	15	53	18	10	6	16	48
1980–81	Quebec Nordiques	NHL	32	2	5	7	25	2	0	0	0	0
1981–82	Maine Mariners	AHL	39	6	10	16	123	3	0	1	1	18
1982–83	Maine Mariners	AHL	69	30	23	53	188	13	2	2	4	18
1982–83	Philadelphia Flyers	NHL	10	2	1	3	4	—	—	—	—	—
1983–84	Maine Mariners	AHL	17	3	6	9	34	—	—	—	—	—
AHL totals			462	135	147	282	1,235	67	26	16	42	165
NHL totals			87	8	14	22	86	5	2	0	2	48

=== Coaching record ===
NHL coaching record
Team	Year	Regular season							Postseason
Team	Year	G	W	L	T	OTL	Pts	Finish	Result
Winnipeg Jets	1991–92	80	33	32	15	–	81	4th in Smythe	Lost in division semi-finals
Winnipeg Jets	1992–93	84	40	37	7	–	87	4th in Smythe	Lost in division semi-finals
Winnipeg Jets	1993–94	84	24	51	9	–	57	6th in Central	Missed playoffs
Winnipeg Jets	1994–95	33	9	18	6	–	24	6th in Central	Resigned
Ottawa Senators	2007–08	64	36	22	–	6	78	2nd in Northeast	Fired
Winnipeg Jets Total		281	106	138	37	–	249		5-8 (0.385)
Ottawa Senators Total		64	36	22	–	6	78		0-0 (0.000)
NHL Total		345	142	160	37	6	327		5-8 (0.385)

Preceded by Mike Smith	General manager of the Winnipeg Jets; 1994–96	Succeeded by Atlanta Thrashers general managers Don Waddell
Preceded by Position created	General manager of the Phoenix Coyotes; 1996	Succeeded by Bobby Smith
Preceded by Bob Murdoch	Head coach of the Winnipeg Jets; 1991–95	Succeeded by Terry Simpson
Preceded by Bryan Murray	Head coach of the Ottawa Senators; 2007–08	Succeeded by Bryan Murray
