= Bob Kelly (ice hockey, born 1950) =

Canadian ice hockey player (born 1950)

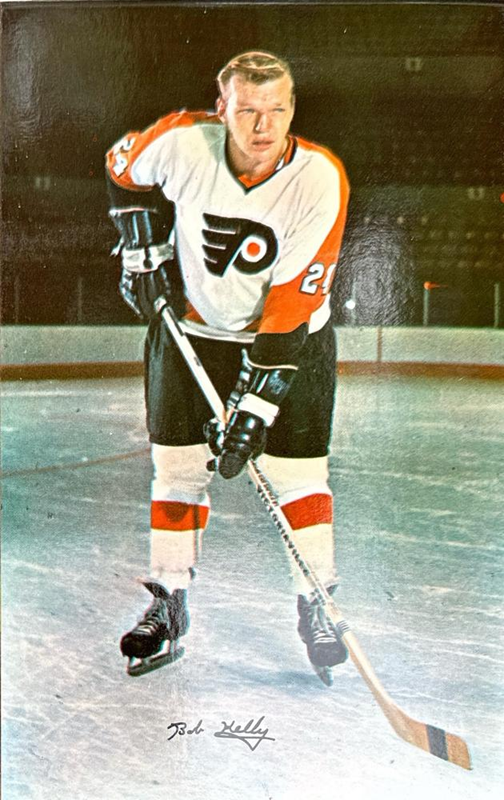
- 1970 postcard of Kelly for Philadelphia Flyers
- Born: November 25, 1950 (age 75) Oakville, Ontario, Canada
- Height: 5 ft 10 in (178 cm)
- Weight: 200 lb (91 kg; 14 st 4 lb)
- Position: Left wing
- Shot: Left
- Played for: Philadelphia Flyers; Washington Capitals
- NHL draft: 32nd overall, 1970; Philadelphia Flyers
- Playing career: 1970–1982

Robert James Kelly (born November 25, 1950), nicknamed "The Hound", is a Canadian former professional ice hockey left winger who played 12 seasons in the National Hockey League (NHL) for the Philadelphia Flyers and Washington Capitals.

== Career ==
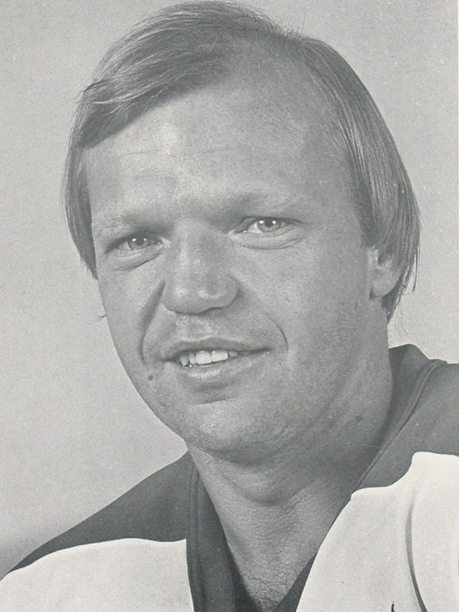
Kelly in 1980 photo for Washington Capitals

Selected in 1970 by the Philadelphia Flyers, Kelly was an aggressive left-winger who became a member of the famous "Broad Street Bullies" and helped guide the Flyers to their two consecutive Stanley Cup championships in 1974 and 1975. Along with teammate Dave Schultz, Kelly was one of the team's top enforcers.

Kelly scored the 1975 Cup-winning goal 11 seconds into the third period of game six. In a tremendous individual effort, he stole the puck behind the Buffalo Sabres net and was able to shoot from the opposite side of the ice where the puck bounced off the post and into the back of Sabres goaltender Roger Crozier where it landed for a goal.

Kelly played with the Flyers until the 1979–80 NHL season when he was traded to the Washington Capitals. He had a career year offensively in his first season with the Capitals, scoring 26 goals and 36 assists for a total of 62 points. After playing on a checking line with the Flyers, he was promoted to the Capitals' top line, alongside Dennis Maruk and Mike Gartner and proved to be an excellent complement to the two highly-skilled players, using his size to create space for them. He also played regularly on the power play for the only time of his career, scoring 8 of his career 14 power play goals that season. However, after playing 16 games during the first two months of the 1981–82 season, the Capitals and Kelly mutually agreed to terminate his contract and Kelly retired.

He is now the Flyers' ambassador of hockey, visiting schools and teaching kids about the importance of teamwork. He also can be seen on the concourse of the Flyers' arena, Xfinity Mobile Arena, interacting with fans, and presenting awards to military guests during Flyers' home games.

== Personal life ==
Kelly was known by several similar nicknames: "Hound Dog", "the Hound", "Mad Dog", "Muttley" or "Mutt", "Machine Gun Kelly", "Grass Fairy" and "Scourge of the Red Army".

== Career statistics ==
			Regular season					Playoffs
Season	Team	League	GP	G	A	Pts	PIM	GP	G	A	Pts	PIM
1968–69	Oshawa Generals	OHA	54	21	23	44	128	—	—	—	—	—
1969–70	Oshawa Generals	OHA	53	21	31	52	117	—	—	—	—	—
1970–71	Philadelphia Flyers	NHL	76	14	18	32	70	4	1	0	1	2
1971–72	Philadelphia Flyers	NHL	78	14	15	29	157	—	—	—	—	—
1972–73	Philadelphia Flyers	NHL	77	10	11	21	238	11	0	1	1	8
1973–74	Philadelphia Flyers	NHL	65	4	10	14	130	5	0	0	0	11
1974–75	Philadelphia Flyers	NHL	67	11	18	29	99	16	3	3	6	15
1975–76	Philadelphia Flyers	NHL	79	12	8	20	125	16	0	2	2	44
1976–77	Philadelphia Flyers	NHL	73	22	24	46	117	10	0	1	1	18
1977–78	Philadelphia Flyers	NHL	74	19	13	32	95	12	3	5	8	26
1978–79	Philadelphia Flyers	NHL	77	7	31	38	132	8	1	1	2	10
1979–80	Philadelphia Flyers	NHL	75	15	20	35	122	19	1	1	2	38
1980–81	Washington Capitals	NHL	80	26	36	62	157	—	—	—	—	—
1981–82	Washington Capitals	NHL	16	0	4	4	12	—	—	—	—	—
NHL totals			837	154	208	362	1454	101	9	14	23	172
