= Al Hill (ice hockey) =

Canadian ice hockey player

- Born: April 22, 1955 (age 71) Nanaimo, British Columbia, Canada
- Height: 6 ft 1 in (185 cm)
- Weight: 175 lb (79 kg; 12 st 7 lb)
- Position: Centre
- Shot: Left
- Played for: Philadelphia Flyers
- NHL draft: Undrafted
- Playing career: 1976–1989

Alan Douglas Hill (born April 22, 1955) is a Canadian former professional ice hockey centre. He spent eight seasons in the National Hockey League (NHL) with the Philadelphia Flyers between 1977 and 1988. The remainder of his playing career, which spanned from 1976 to 1989, took place primarily in the American Hockey League (AHL).

== Career ==
On February 14, 1977, Hill played his first NHL game with the Philadelphia Flyers, making an impressive debut by tallying two goals and three assists in a 6–4 win over the St. Louis Blues. His five-point performance set an NHL record for the most points in a debut game, (Note: This excludes the five-goal games scored by Harry Hyland and Joe Malone on opening day of the inaugural 1917–18 NHL season.) with both of his goals coming in the first period at 0:36 and 11:33 against goaltender Yves Bélanger. Hill concluded his hockey career following the 1988–89 AHL season.

Hill transitioned into coaching after his playing career, starting as an assistant coach with the Hershey Bears for one season. He then joined the Binghamton Rangers, where he spent five seasons. During his third year in Binghamton, he was promoted to assistant coach of the New York Rangers on January 17, 1993. Before the 1993–94 season, Hill returned to Binghamton as head coach. However, the Rangers chose not to renew his contract after the 1994–95 season. He then became an associate coach with the Cincinnati Cyclones of the IHL for two seasons. After a brief stint as head coach of the UHL's B.C. Icemen, Hill stepped down and rejoined the Philadelphia Flyers in 1998 as a professional scout, a position he held until retiring in 2023.

== Career statistics ==
=== Regular season and playoffs ===
			Regular season					Playoffs
Season	Team	League	GP	G	A	Pts	PIM	GP	G	A	Pts	PIM
1973–74	Nanaimo Clippers	BCHL	64	29	41	70	60	—	—	—	—	—
1974–75	Victoria Cougars	WCHL	70	21	36	57	75	12	5	2	7	21
1975–76	Victoria Cougars	WCHL	68	26	40	66	172	15	5	10	15	94
1976–77	Philadelphia Flyers	NHL	9	2	4	6	27	—	—	—	—	—
1976–77	Springfield Indians	AHL	63	13	28	41	125	—	—	—	—	—
1977–78	Philadelphia Flyers	NHL	3	0	0	0	2	—	—	—	—	—
1977–78	Maine Mariners	AHL	80	32	59	91	118	12	2	7	9	49
1978–79	Philadelphia Flyers	NHL	31	5	11	16	28	7	1	0	1	2
1978–79	Maine Mariners	AHL	35	11	14	25	59	—	—	—	—	—
1979–80	Philadelphia Flyers	NHL	61	16	10	26	53	19	3	5	8	19
1980–81	Philadelphia Flyers	NHL	57	10	15	25	45	12	2	4	6	18
1981–82	Philadelphia Flyers	NHL	41	6	13	19	58	3	0	0	0	0
1982–83	Moncton Alpines	AHL	78	22	22	44	78	—	—	—	—	—
1983–84	Maine Mariners	AHL	51	7	17	24	51	17	6	12	18	22
1984–85	Hershey Bears	AHL	73	11	30	41	77	—	—	—	—	—
1985–86	Hershey Bears	AHL	80	17	40	57	129	18	2	6	8	52
1986–87	Philadelphia Flyers	NHL	7	0	2	2	4	9	2	1	3	0
1986–87	Hershey Bears	AHL	76	13	35	48	124	5	0	1	1	2
1987–88	Philadelphia Flyers	NHL	12	1	0	1	10	1	0	1	1	4
1987–88	Hershey Bears	AHL	57	10	21	31	62	10	1	6	7	12
1988–89	Hershey Bears	AHL	62	13	20	33	63	8	2	0	2	10
AHL totals			655	149	286	435	886	70	13	32	45	147
NHL totals			221	40	55	95	227	51	8	11	19	43
