= Don Edwards (ice hockey) =

Canadian ice hockey player (born 1955)

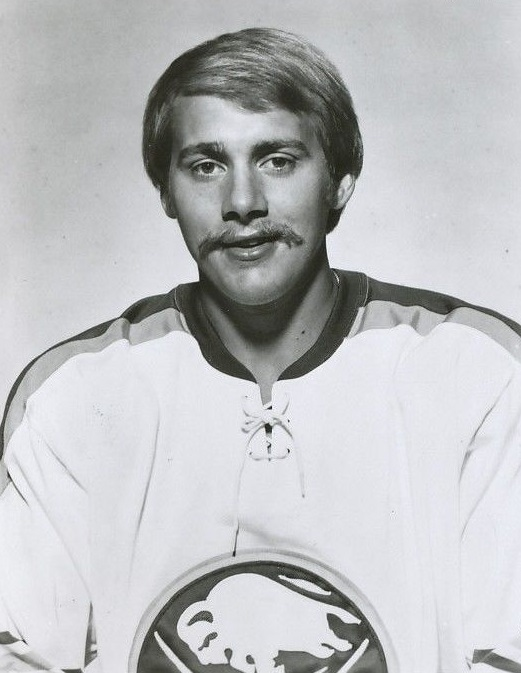
- Edwards with the Buffalo Sabres in 1977
- Born: September 28, 1955 (age 70) Hamilton, Ontario, Canada
- Height: 5 ft 8 in (173 cm)
- Weight: 165 lb (75 kg; 11 st 11 lb)
- Position: Goaltender
- Caught: Left
- Played for: Buffalo Sabres; Calgary Flames; Toronto Maple Leafs
- National team: Canada
- NHL draft: 89th overall, 1975; Buffalo Sabres
- WHA draft: 135th overall, 1975; San Diego Mariners
- Playing career: 1975–1988

Donald Laurie Edwards (born September 28, 1955) is a Canadian former professional ice hockey goaltender who played ten seasons in the National Hockey League for the Buffalo Sabres, Calgary Flames, and Toronto Maple Leafs.

== Playing career ==
Edwards started his hockey career in the juniors with the Kitchener Rangers in the OHA-Jr. He was very successful, playing in 90 games over 2 seasons, but was not considered a high draft pick, because of his small size. Despite that, he was still picked 89th overall in the 1975 NHL Amateur Draft by the Buffalo Sabres.

In his first NHL season, Edwards played in 25 games after spending the prior season in the AHL with the Hershey Bears. He finished the season with 16 wins, 7 losses and a 2.51 GAA. On February 13, 1977, Edwards played a role in perhaps the most unusual event in Sabres history. A day after Edwards reported to Buffalo from Hershey, Sabres general manager Punch Imlach ordered coach Floyd Smith to have Edwards replace expected starting goaltender Al Smith:

"I got to the locker room at about 5 p.m. for the game. We all went out on the ice and Al Smith took all of the warm-ups. Then I was sitting next to him in the locker room right before game time and said 'Good luck tonight.' He looked at me and said 'You don't know you're playing?'"

"That sort of ended the conversation right there. I was dumbfounded. So they play the anthem and when it ends Al hops off the bench, skates about five strides and says 'See you, Seymour' to Sabres owner Seymour Knox in the crowd. Then he skates off the ice. Also referred to by Sabre fans as "Sayonara" So it's my first game in the NHL and I was the only goalie in uniform."

In 1978, Edwards was named the top goalie for the Sabres. He played in 72 games and was selected to the NHL Second All-Star Team. Next season, the Sabres cut Edwards' games down because they were afraid of overusing him. Edwards shared his duties with goaltender Bob Sauve and Edwards finished with 26-18-9 record. In 1980, he and Sauve were awarded the Vezina Trophy for their performance. Edwards was also selected to the NHL Second All-Star Team and played in the All-Star Game. On February 24, 1982, Edwards was a part of history as he gave up Wayne Gretzky's 77th goal in a game vs. the Edmonton Oilers at Buffalo Memorial Auditorium. With that goal, Wayne Gretzky broke Phil Esposito's record of 76 goals.

Edwards played two more seasons with the Sabres before being traded on June 8, 1982 to the Calgary Flames with teammate Richie Dunn and a second round draft pick in 1982 (Rich Kromm) in 1982 in exchange for a first round pick in 1982 (Paul Cyr), second-round picks in 1982 (Jens Johansson) and 1983 (John Tucker). In three years in Calgary, Edwards did not reach the same level of play as he had during his time in Buffalo. On May 29, 1985 Calgary traded Edwards in 1986 to the Toronto Maple Leafs, his favorite team as a child, in exchange for future considerations that turned into a 4th round pick in 1987 (Tim Harris). Edwards played in 38 games with the Leafs before the remaining 2 years of his contract were bought out, marking the end of his NHL career. He went on to win an Allan Cup with the Brantford Mott's Clammatos before playing his last game with the Nova Scotia Oilers in the AHL in 1988 where he would officially retire.

=== International play ===
Although Edwards enjoyed several successful seasons in Buffalo, he named the Sabres' 6-1 victory over the Soviet Red Army on January 3, 1980 as his greatest moment in a Buffalo uniform. Edwards was named the game's most valuable player.

"I have this belief that hockey is a North American game, and I still believe that today. The Soviets were great intimidators, and I remember Team Canada '72. Then I had the chance to personally go through that intimidation stuff on the ice. Because of it, I had a distinct dislike of the Soviets and wanted to do everything I could to beat them."

In 1981, Edwards was selected to play for Team Canada in the Canada Cup. Edwards played in only one game because he was the back-up goaltender to Mike Liut. He helped Canada finish second in the tournament.

== Post-playing career ==
An outstanding golfer, Edwards spent parts of his off-seasons participating in tournaments. He also held coaching positions in the National Hockey League, serving as the Los Angeles Kings' assistant coach and the Carolina Hurricanes' goaltending coach. He was the general manager of the Saginaw Spirit of the Ontario Hockey League from 2007 to 2008.

Edwards worked as a broadcaster on TSN and as a real estate agent, prior to the 1991 murders of his parents. Edwards relinquished the two careers as a result of post-traumatic stress disorder.

== Personal life ==
Edwards grew up a fan of the Toronto Maple Leafs, fulfilling a childhood dream by ending his NHL career with the team.

Edwards is the son of Arnold and Donna Edwards. On March 21, 1991, Edwards' parents were murdered in their Hamilton home by George Lovie, who was briefly in a relationship with Edwards' sister, Michele. Lovie was sentenced to life in prison following the murders. He was granted day parole in 2020, and full parole in 2024.

Edwards is married and has two children. Since the murders of his parents, Edwards has gone to great lengths to protect his family's privacy by not disclosing their names or location of residence to the media.

Edwards is the nephew of former NHL hockey player, Roy Edwards.

== Awards and achievements ==
- Selected to the OMJHL First All-Star Team in 1974, 1975.
- Selected to the AHL Second All-Star Team in 1976.
- Selected to the NHL Second All-Star Team in 1978, 1980.
- Played in 1980, 1982 NHL All-Star Games.
- Vezina Trophy winner in 1980 (shared with Bob Sauve).
- Allan Cup championship in 1987.

== Career statistics ==
=== Regular season and playoffs ===
			Regular season									Playoffs
Season	Team	League	GP	W	L	T	MIN	GA	SO	GAA	SV%	GP	W	L	MIN	GA	SO	GAA	SV%
1973–74	Kitchener Rangers	OHA-Jr.	35	—	—	—	2089	95	3	2.73	—	—	—	—	—	—	—	—	—
1974–75	Kitchener Rangers	OMJHL	55	—	—	—	3294	258	1	4.70	—	—	—	—	—	—	—	—	—
1975–76	Hershey Bears	AHL	39	23	12	2	2253	128	3	3.41	—	5	1	3	293	18	0	3.68	—
1976–77	Hershey Bears	AHL	47	26	15	6	2797	136	5	2.91	—	—	—	—	—	—	—	—	—
1976–77	Buffalo Sabres	NHL	25	16	7	2	1480	62	2	2.51	.900	5	2	3	300	15	0	3.00	.878
1977–78	Buffalo Sabres	NHL	72	38	16	17	4209	185	5	2.64	.906	8	3	5	482	22	0	2.74	.896
1978–79	Buffalo Sabres	NHL	54	26	18	9	3160	159	2	3.02	.899	—	—	—	—	—	—	—	—
1979–80	Buffalo Sabres	NHL	49	27	9	12	2920	125	2	2.57	.893	6	3	3	360	17	1	2.83	.899
1980–81	Buffalo Sabres	NHL	45	23	10	12	2700	133	3	2.96	.898	8	4	4	503	28	0	3.34	.888
1981–82	Buffalo Sabres	NHL	62	26	23	9	3500	205	0	3.51	.882	4	1	3	214	16	0	4.49	.846
1982–83	Calgary Flames	NHL	39	16	15	6	2209	148	1	4.02	.882	5	1	2	226	22	0	5.84	.823
1983–84	Calgary Flames	NHL	41	13	19	5	2303	157	0	4.09	.871	6	2	1	217	12	0	3.32	.910
1984–85	Calgary Flames	NHL	34	11	15	2	1691	115	1	4.08	.866	—	—	—	—	—	—	—	—
1985–86	Toronto Maple Leafs	NHL	38	12	23	0	2009	160	0	4.78	.860	—	—	—	—	—	—	—	—
1986–87	Brantford Motts Clamatos	OHA-Sr.	17	14	1	0	966	52	0	3.42	—	—	—	—	—	—	—	—	—
1987–88	Nova Scotia Oilers	AHL	3	—	—	—	180	18	0	6.00	.871	—	—	—	—	—	—	—	—
NHL totals			459	208	155	74	26,181	1,449	16	3.32	.887	42	16	21	2,302	132	1	3.44	.882

=== International ===
Year	Team	Event	GP	W	L	T	MIN	GA	SO	GAA
1981	Canada	CC	1	1	0	0	60	3	0	3.00

"Edwards' stats". The Goaltender Home Page.

Preceded by Ken Dryden and Michel Larocque	Winner of the Vezina Trophy with Bob Sauve; 1980	Succeeded by Denis Herron, Michel Larocque, and Richard Sevigny
