= Vezina Trophy =

Ice hockey award

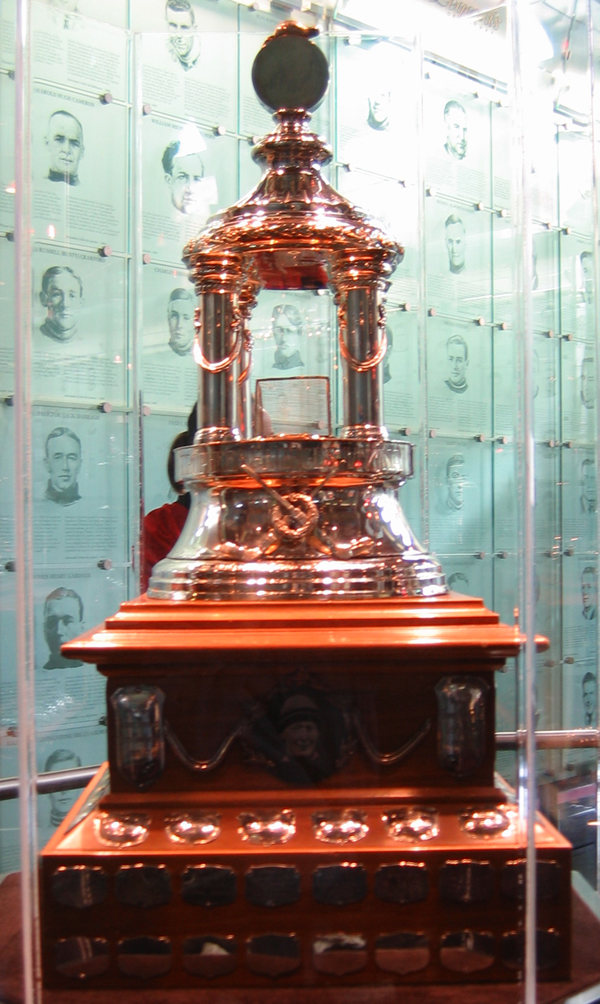
- Sport: Ice hockey
- Awarded for: National Hockey League's goaltender who is "adjudged to be the best at this position"

History
- First award: 1926–27 NHL season
- First winner: George Hainsworth
- Most wins: Jacques Plante (7)
- Most recent: Andrei Vasilevskiy; Tampa Bay Lightning

The Vezina Trophy (/vɛzənə/ VEH-zə-nə) is awarded annually to the National Hockey League (NHL) goaltender who is "adjudged to be the best at this position". At the end of each season, the thirty-two NHL general managers vote to determine the winner. It is named in honour of Georges Vezina, goaltender of the Montreal Canadiens from 1910 until 1925, who died in 1926 of tuberculosis. The trophy was first awarded after the 1926–27 NHL season and was awarded to the top goaltender. From 1946–47 to 1981–82, the trophy went to the goaltender(s) of the team allowing the fewest goals during the regular season; since the 1981–82 season, the William M. Jennings Trophy has been awarded for this accomplishment.

The most recent winner is Andrei Vasilevskiy who won his second Vezina Trophy for the 2025–26 season.

== History ==
The Vezina Trophy was named in honor of Georges Vezina, an exceptional goaltender with the Montreal Canadiens. Vezina collapsed during a game in 1925 and was diagnosed as having tuberculosis, of which he died in 1926. Upon Vezina's death, the trophy was donated to the League by the Canadiens' owners, Leo Dandurand, Louis Letourneau and Joe Cattarinich to honour Vezina permanently. It was first awarded at the end of the 1926–27 NHL season to George Hainsworth who had come to Montreal to succeed Vezina.

The trophy was accepted by the league at its May 15, 1927, meeting in Montreal. The criteria for winning was variously reported. The Montreal Gazette and The Globe and Mail reported that it was 'to be awarded each year to the goaltender in the National Hockey League having the best (goals against) average,' while the Toronto Star reported that the trophy went to the 'most valuable' goaltender in the league. When Hainsworth won his third Vezina at the end of the 1928–29 NHL season, the trophy was reported to be for the 'most outstanding' goaltender in the league. However, later reports state that the trophy was based on the lowest goals against average (GAA).

The Vezina Trophy was quite prestigious, as it was one of the three major personal awards given out by the National Hockey League at the time, along with the Hart Trophy and the Lady Byng Memorial Trophy. The hockey media closely follow a tight "Vezina Trophy race," such as in 1940–41, when Frank Brimsek, Turk Broda, and Johnny Mowers were separated by only three goals entering the final weekend of the season.

=== 1946 to 1981 ===
In February 1946, the NHL stated that the trophy was to go to the team that allowed the fewest goals during the regular season. The goaltender playing the most games for that team would be awarded the trophy. Manager Tommy Gorman of the Montreal Canadiens stated that if the trophy was awarded to his team, management would decide which of the Habs' two goaltenders (Paul Bibeault and Bill Durnan) would receive the trophy. However, at a banquet that October, NHL President Clarence Campbell indicated that while the league was considering changing the voting methods of the Calder, Hart, and Lady Byng Trophies, the criteria for the Vezina were not changing.

Since it was common for goaltenders to start every game before 1950, the Vezina usually went to the goaltender with the lowest personal goals against average in the league; however, there were two notable exceptions. George Hainsworth was awarded the inaugural trophy, while Clint Benedict had the lowest GAA in 1926–27. Hainsworth's Canadiens allowed fewer goals as a team than Benedict's Maroons. Wilf Cude had the lowest GAA in 1933–34 in 30 games split between the Detroit Red Wings and Canadiens, but the Vezina was awarded to Charlie Gardiner, who started all 48 games for the Chicago Black Hawks, the team that allowed the fewest goals.

The National Hockey League lengthened the schedule to 70 games starting in 1949–50. Before then, it was very common for a goaltender to play every minute of his team's season, and only two Vezina winners—Frank Brimsek in both 1938–39 (43 of 48 games) and 1941–42 (47 of 48 games) and Bill Durnan in 1944–45 (40 of 50 games)—failed to start every game for their respective clubs.

As teams started to use more than one goaltender in a season regularly, it became increasingly common for the goaltender with the lowest GAA not to be a member of the team that allowed the fewest goals. The Vezina continued to be awarded to the goaltender who started the most games for the team that allowed the fewest goals, but the Vezina winners of 1954–55, 1960–61, 1962–63 and 1963–64 did not have the lowest GAAs.

The National Hockey League began allowing teammates to split the Vezina Trophy following the 1964–65 NHL season. The Toronto Maple Leafs allowed 173 goals against (0 empty net goals), barely beating out Detroit's 175 goals against (3 empty net goals), and Chicago's 176 goals against (3 empty net goals). Toronto Terry Sawchuk played 36 games for the Leafs with a GAA of 2.56, while his teammate Johnny Bower played 34 games with a league-leading GAA of 2.38, but Sawchuk was to be the sole winner under the old criteria. During the season, the two agreed to split the $1000 prize money that came with the trophy if either of them won. At the end of the season, Sawchuk publicly stated that he would refuse the trophy if Bower would not also have his name inscribed. The NHL subsequently changed the rule to allow any goaltender on the team who allowed the fewest goals against to qualify for the Vezina if he played at least 25 games, and applied this rule retroactively to Sawchuk and Bower. Under this criterion, Turk Broda would have shared the Vezina that Al Rollins won in 1950–51. This criterion was in place until 1980–81.

The Vezina criteria had the trophy going to the goaltender(s) of the team that was best at preventing goals, not necessarily the best individual goaltender of the year. The best goaltender, as voted by the media, was the NHL first team All-Star. These often differed, such as in 1979–80 when Don Edwards and Bob Sauve shared the Vezina while Tony Esposito was named to the First Team. During the 1973–74 NHL season, the Chicago Black Hawks and Philadelphia Flyers finished tied for the fewest goals against; therefore their respective goaltenders, Tony Esposito and Bernie Parent, were both awarded the trophy, the only time that it would be shared between two players from different teams. For 1973–74 the media voted Parent a First Team All-Star and Esposito a Second Team All-Star. Glenn Hall, who played for Detroit, Chicago and St. Louis during his career, was voted the First Team All-Star goaltender the most times of any goaltender, seven times, but only won the Vezina Trophy as the goaltender on the team allowing the fewest goals against three times. By contrast, Jacques Plante, was awarded the Vezina Trophy seven times, six of those when with the very dominant Montreal Canadiens of the 1950s and 1960s, but was voted as the First Team All-Star only three times. Plante's seventh Vezina Trophy was shared with Hall as they shared goaltending duties for the St. Louis Blues in 1968–69 when that team allowed the fewest goals in the league; Hall was voted as the First Team All-Star that year.

=== 1981 to the present ===
As of the 1981–82 NHL season, the Vezina Trophy has been given to the most outstanding goaltender as voted by the general managers of the NHL teams. Billy Smith of the New York Islanders was the first winner of the Vezina under the current system. The William M. Jennings Trophy, given to the goaltender(s) who play(s) a minimum of 25 games for the team that allows the fewest goals, serves the function of the old Vezina.

The voting is conducted at the end of the regular season by the 32 general managers of the teams in the National Hockey League, with all individual voters ranking their top three candidates on a 5–3–1 points system. Three finalists are named and the trophy is awarded at the NHL Awards ceremony after the playoffs.

=== Records and distinctions ===
Jacques Plante holds the record for winning the most Vezinas with seven, followed by Bill Durnan and Dominik Hasek, who have won six each. Hasek has won the most awards under the current criterion of voting for the best individual goalie. Players for the Montreal Canadiens have won the Vezina 29 times.

Only five players have won both the Vezina and Hart Memorial Trophy for the same season: Jacques Plante for 1961–62; Dominik Hasek twice, for 1996–97 and 1997–98; Jose Theodore for 2001–02; Carey Price for 2014–15; and Connor Hellebuyck for 2024–25. Two other goaltenders have won the Vezina and Hart trophies in separate seasons: Roy Worters (Hart 1928–29, Vezina 1930–31) and Al Rollins (Vezina 1950–51, Hart 1953–54). Chuck Rayner is the only goaltender who has won the Hart Memorial Trophy (which he did in 1949–50) but never won the Vezina Trophy.

== Winners ==
=== 1927–1981 ===
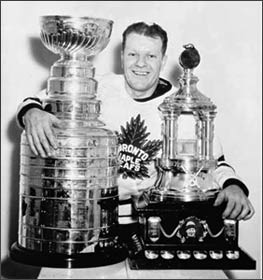
Turk Broda, two-time winner.

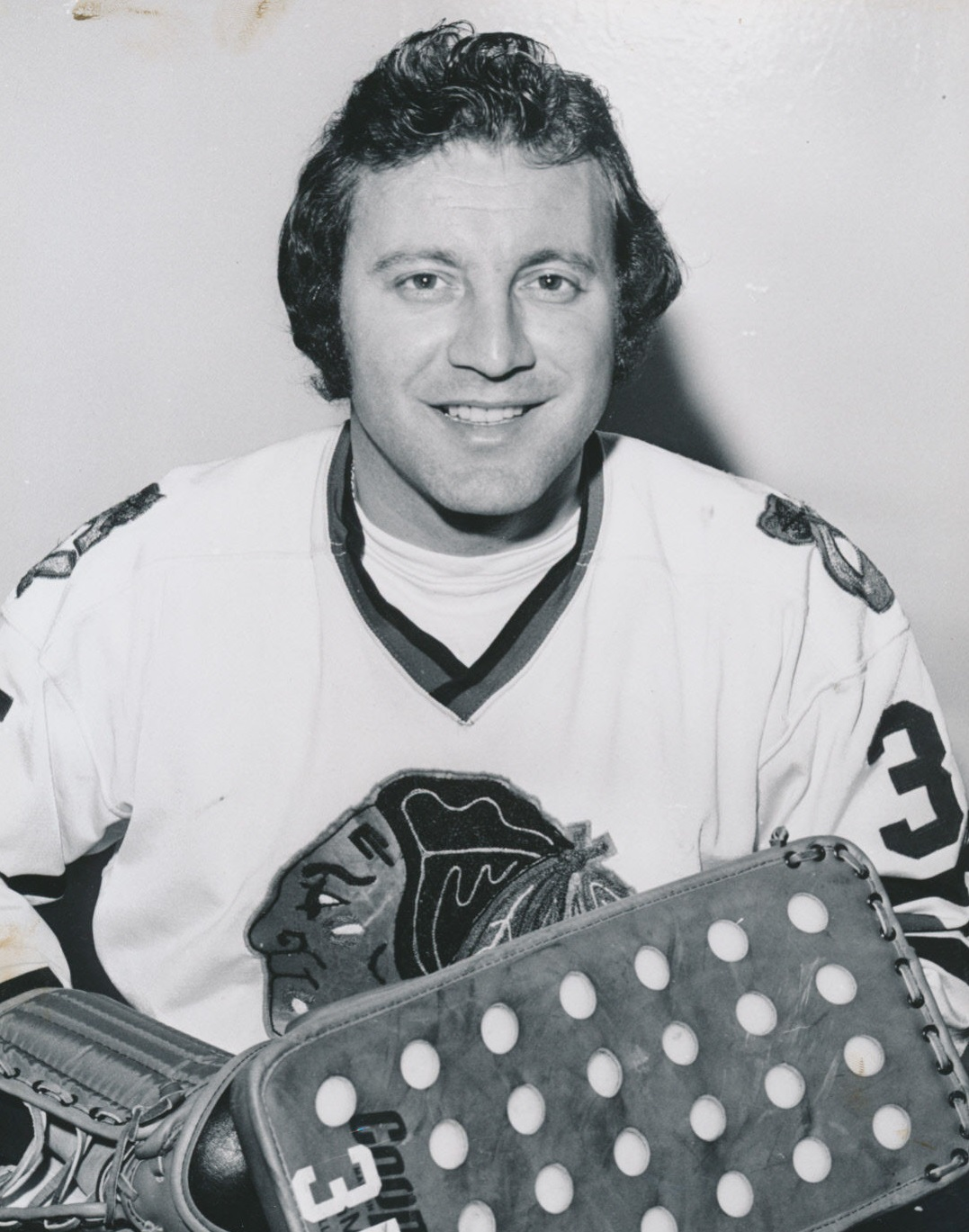
Tony Esposito, three-time winner.

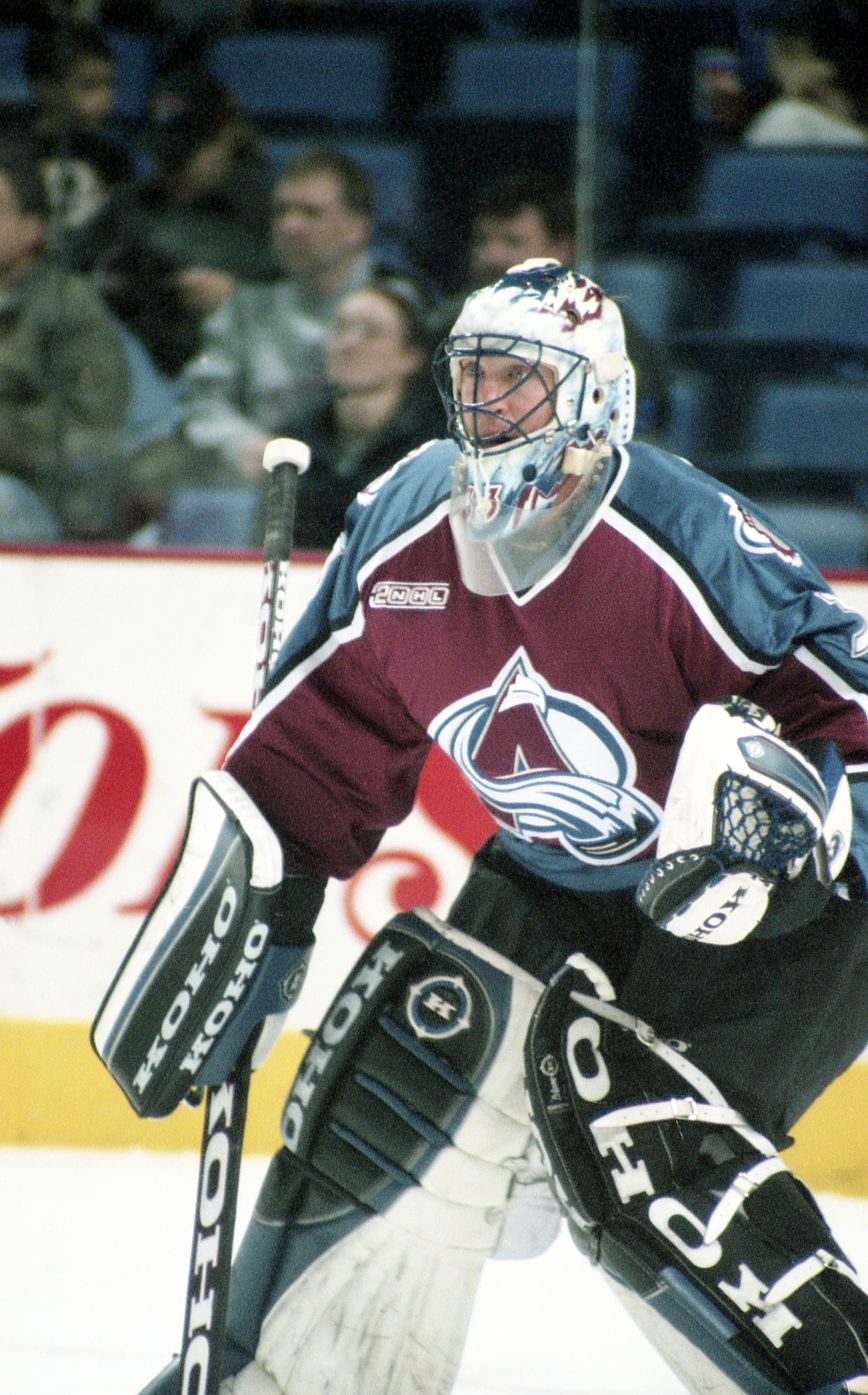
Patrick Roy, three-time winner.

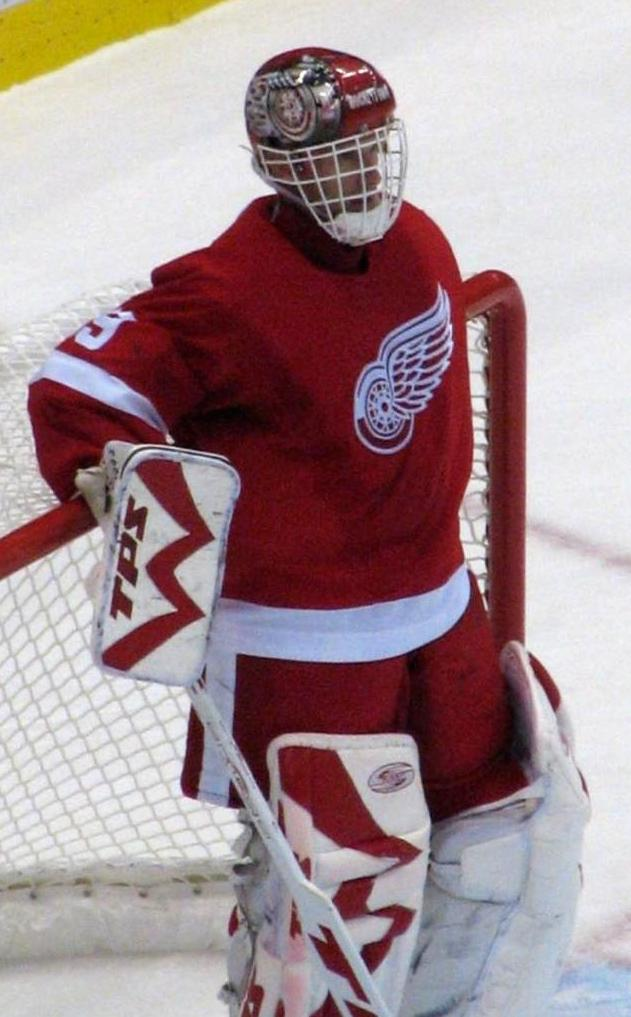
Dominik Hasek, six-time winner.

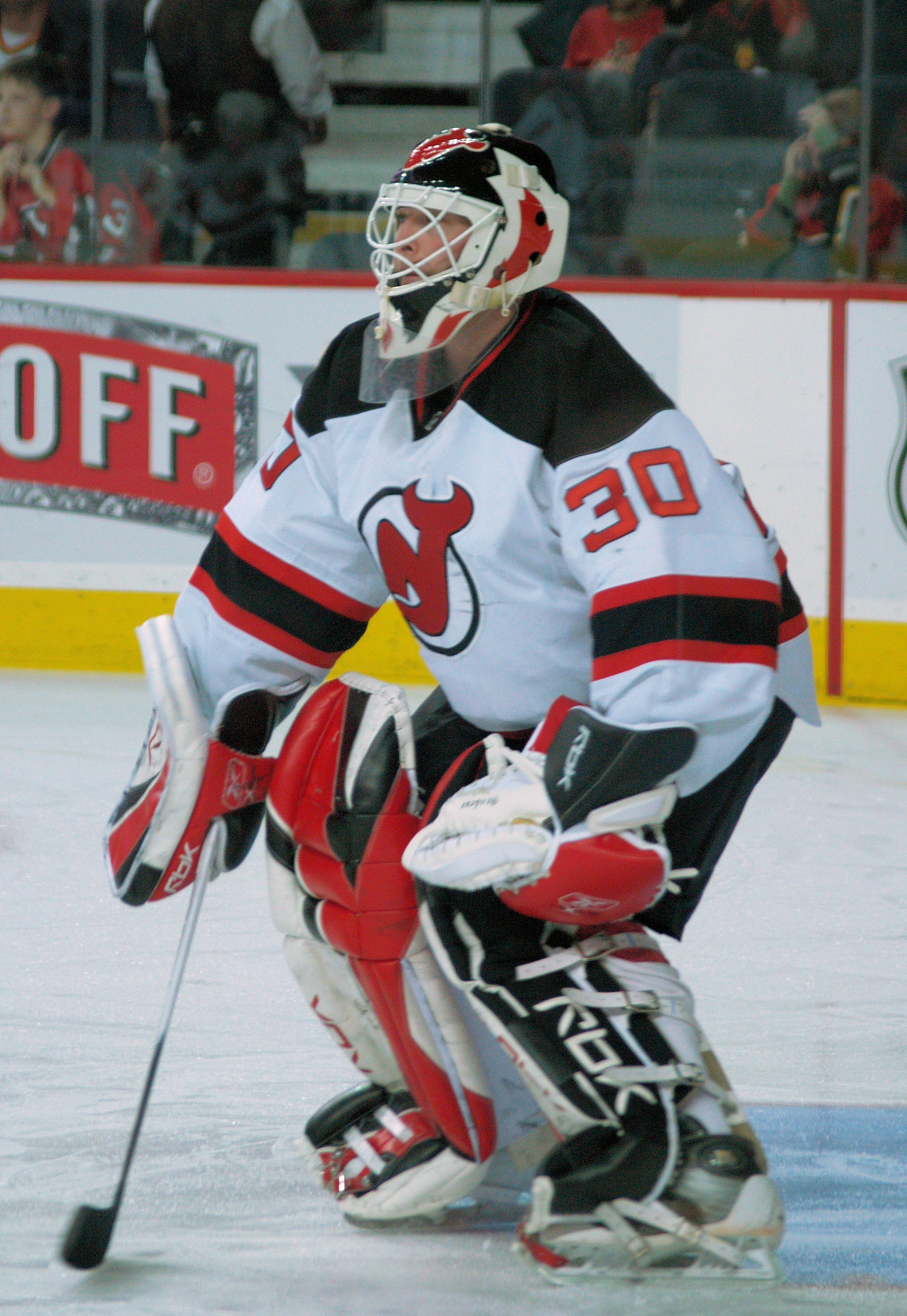
Martin Brodeur, four-time winner.

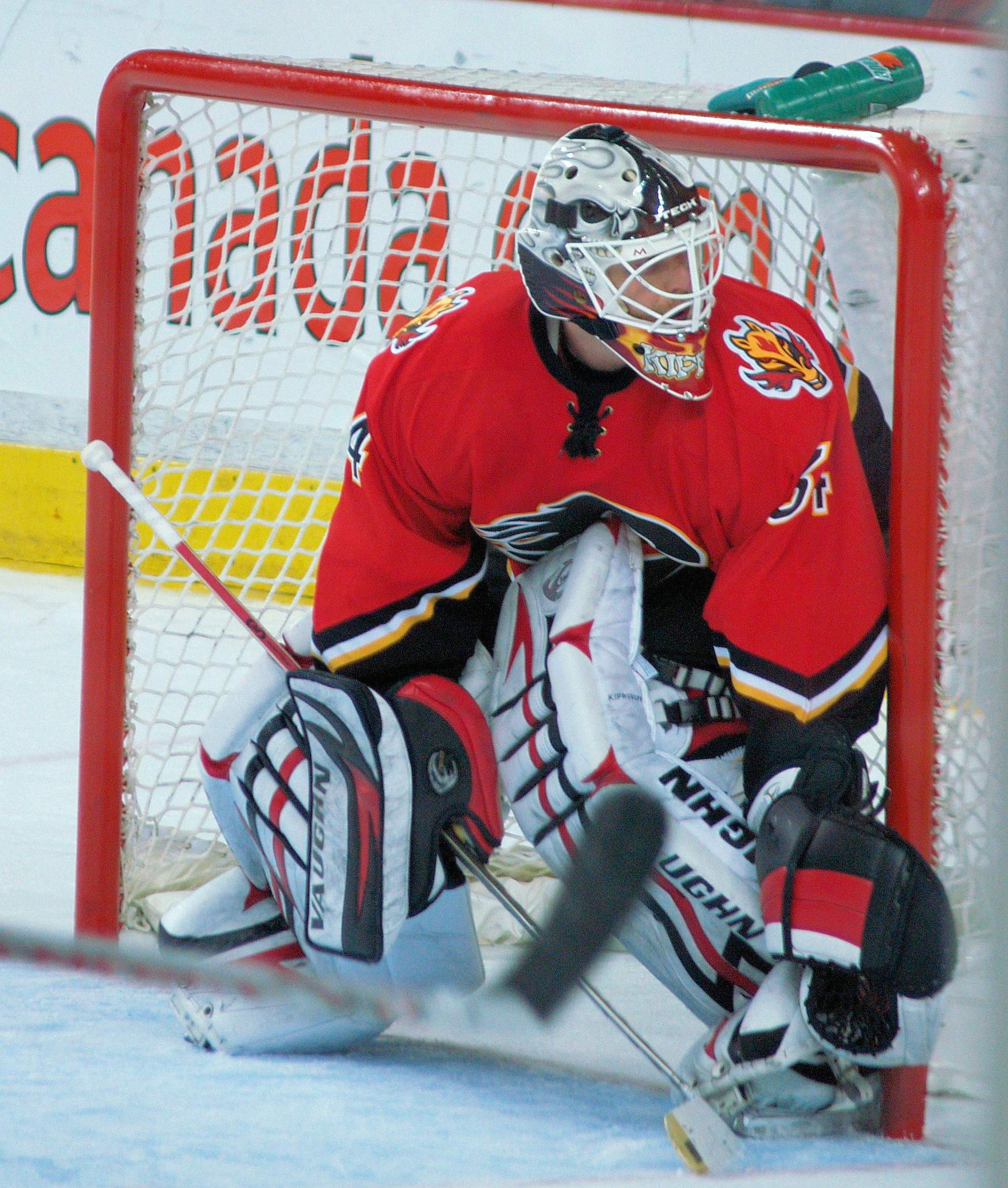
Miikka Kiprusoff, one-time winner.

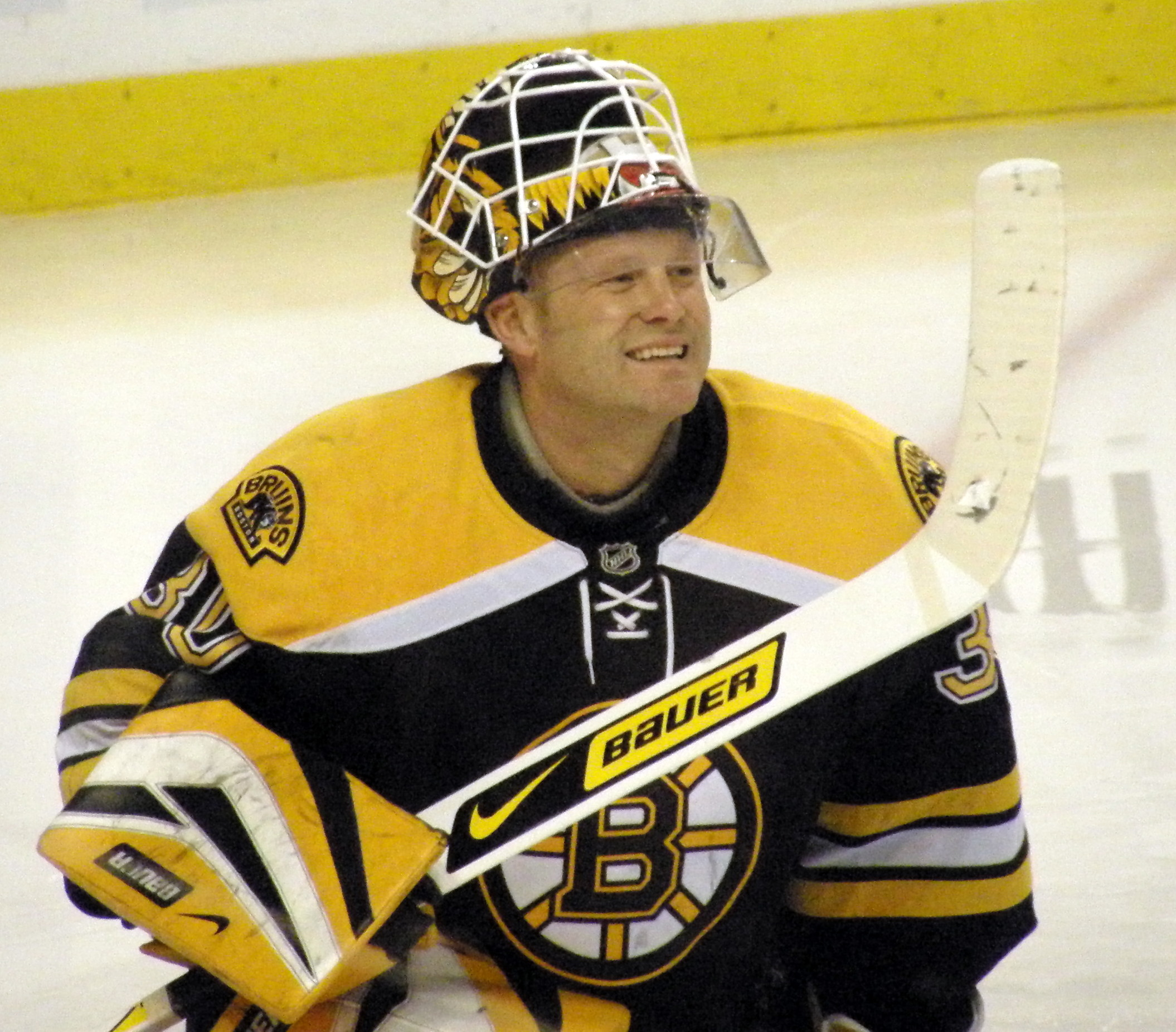
Tim Thomas, two-time winner.

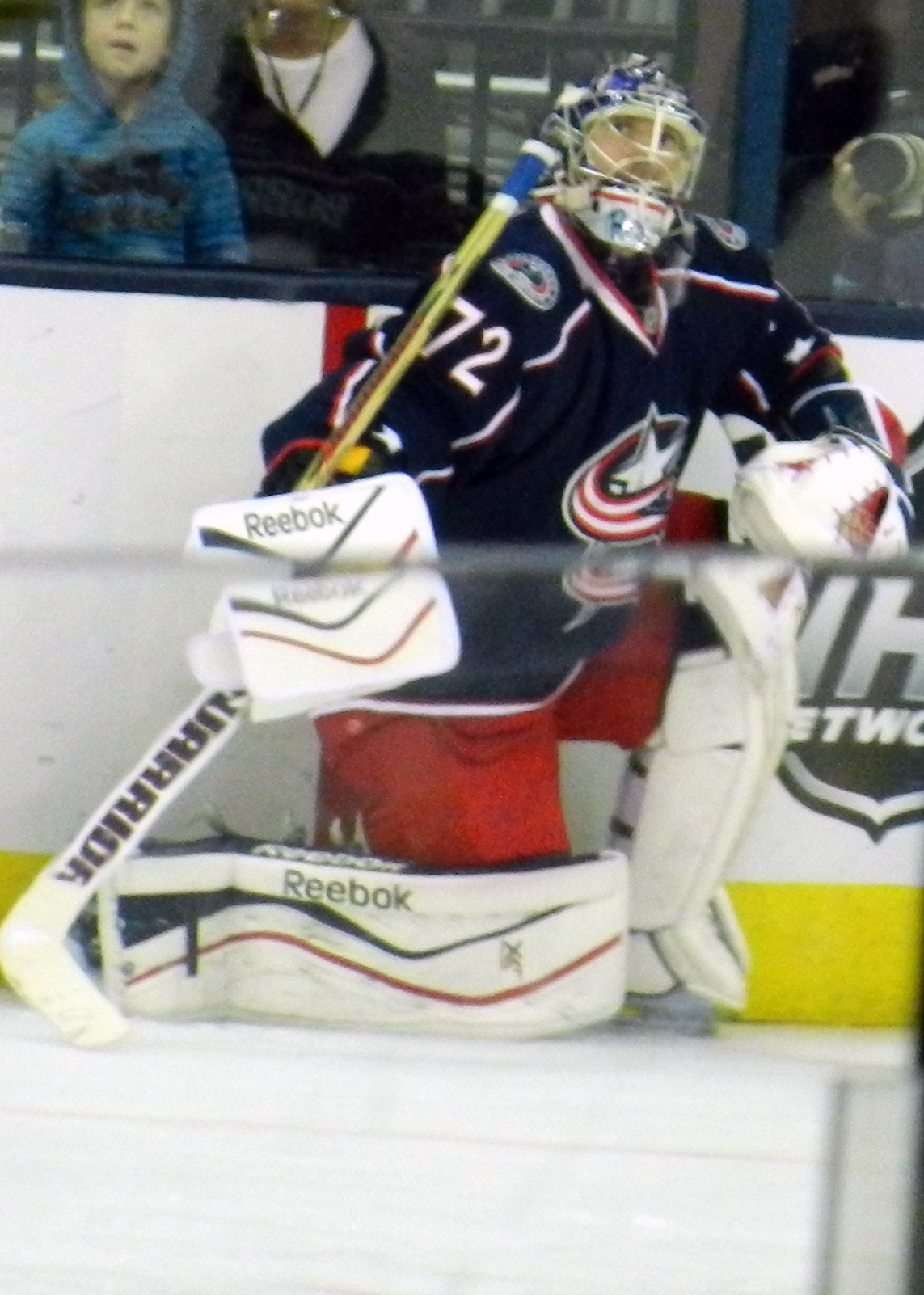
Sergei Bobrovsky, two-time winner.

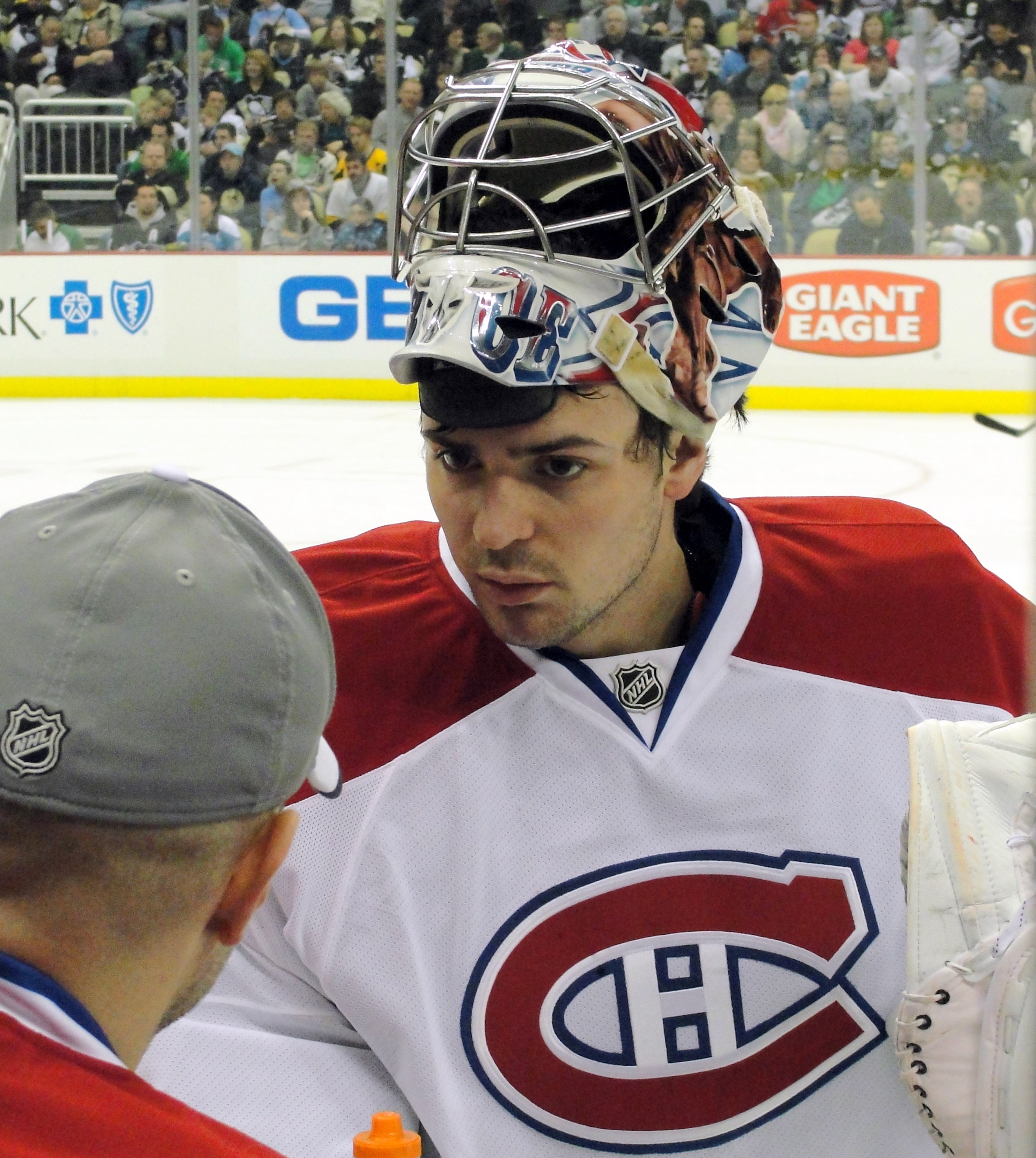
Carey Price, one-time winner.

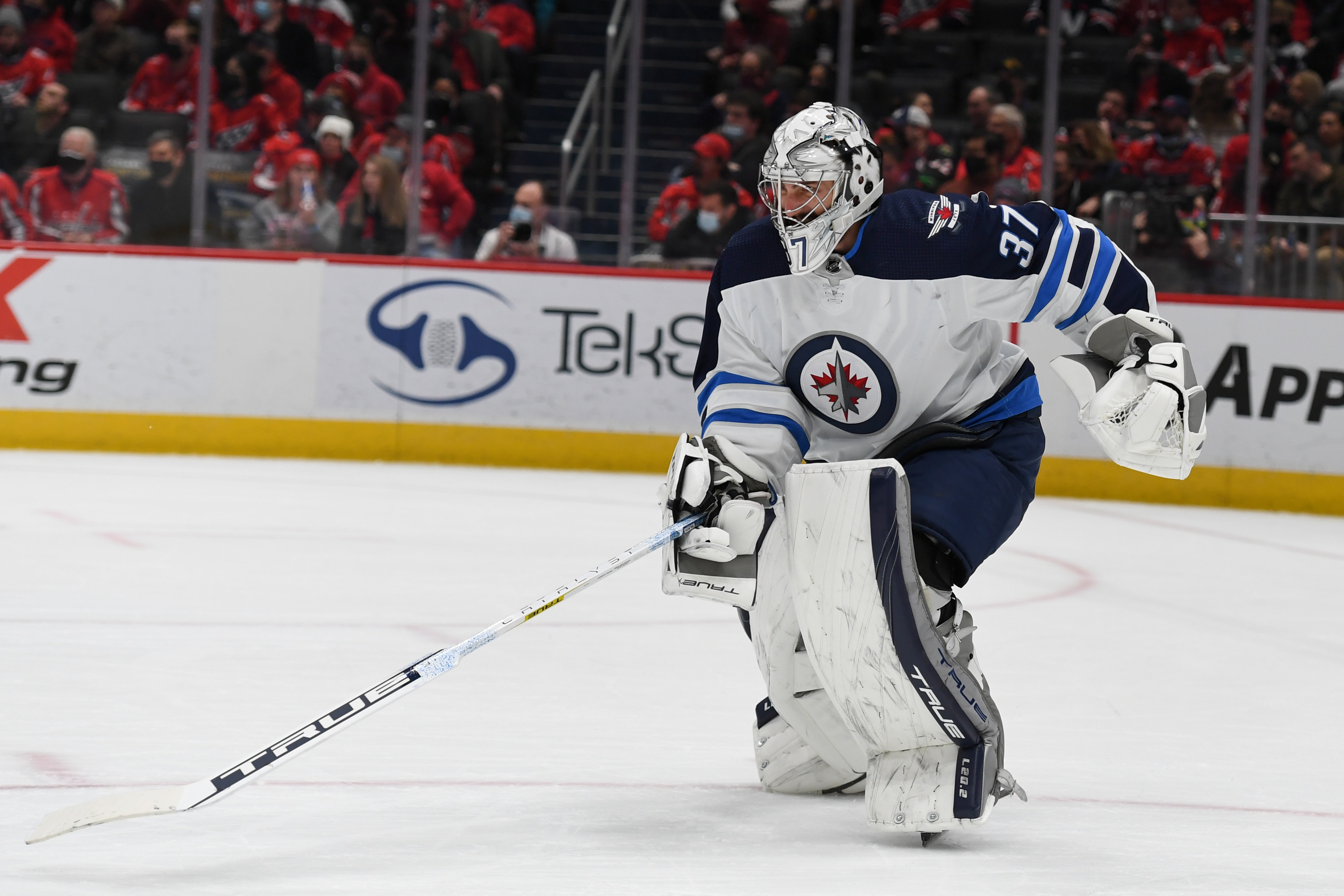
Connor Hellebuyck, three-time winner

When introduced, the Vezina Trophy was awarded to the top goaltender in the league. Several winners, including Hainsworth in 1927 and Gardiner in 1934, did not have the lowest goals-against average. In 1946, the NHL Governors further clarified the criteria for winning. It was to go to the team with the fewest goals scored against it during the season. The goalie playing the most games for the team was awarded the trophy. In 1965, the NHL Governors began allowing teammates to share the Vezina Trophy. From 1965 to 1981, the Vezina was awarded to any goaltenders who played 25 or more games for the team allowing the fewest goals against.

Player's team won the Stanley Cup
Player elected to Hockey Hall of Fame

Season	Winner	Team	Win #
1926–27	George Hainsworth	Montreal Canadiens	1
1927–28	George Hainsworth	Montreal Canadiens	2
1928–29	George Hainsworth	Montreal Canadiens	3
1929–30	Tiny Thompson	Boston Bruins	1
1930–31	Roy Worters	New York Americans	1
1931–32	Charlie Gardiner	Chicago Black Hawks	1
1932–33	Tiny Thompson	Boston Bruins	2
1933–34	Charlie Gardiner	Chicago Black Hawks	2
1934–35	Lorne Chabot	Chicago Black Hawks	1
1935–36	Tiny Thompson	Boston Bruins	3
1936–37	Normie Smith	Detroit Red Wings	1
1937–38	Tiny Thompson	Boston Bruins	4
1938–39	Frank Brimsek	Boston Bruins	1
1939–40	David Kerr	New York Rangers	1
1940–41	Turk Broda	Toronto Maple Leafs	1
1941–42	Frank Brimsek	Boston Bruins	2
1942–43	Johnny Mowers	Detroit Red Wings	1
1943–44	Bill Durnan	Montreal Canadiens	1
1944–45	Bill Durnan	Montreal Canadiens	2
1945–46	Bill Durnan	Montreal Canadiens	3
1946–47	Bill Durnan	Montreal Canadiens	4
1947–48	Turk Broda	Toronto Maple Leafs	2
1948–49	Bill Durnan	Montreal Canadiens	5
1949–50	Bill Durnan	Montreal Canadiens	6
1950–51	Al Rollins	Toronto Maple Leafs	1
1951–52	Terry Sawchuk	Detroit Red Wings	1
1952–53	Terry Sawchuk	Detroit Red Wings	2
1953–54	Harry Lumley	Toronto Maple Leafs	1
1954–55	Terry Sawchuk	Detroit Red Wings	3
1955–56	Jacques Plante	Montreal Canadiens	1
1956–57	Jacques Plante	Montreal Canadiens	2
1957–58	Jacques Plante	Montreal Canadiens	3
1958–59	Jacques Plante	Montreal Canadiens	4
1959–60	Jacques Plante	Montreal Canadiens	5
1960–61	Johnny Bower	Toronto Maple Leafs	1
1961–62	Jacques Plante	Montreal Canadiens	6
1962–63	Glenn Hall	Chicago Black Hawks	1
1963–64	Charlie Hodge	Montreal Canadiens	1
1964–65	Johnny Bower	Toronto Maple Leafs	2
1964–65	Terry Sawchuk	Toronto Maple Leafs	4
1965–66	Gump Worsley	Montreal Canadiens	1
1965–66	Charlie Hodge	Montreal Canadiens	2
1966–67	Glenn Hall	Chicago Black Hawks	2
1966–67	Denis DeJordy	Chicago Black Hawks	1
1967–68	Gump Worsley	Montreal Canadiens	2
1967–68	Rogatien Vachon	Montreal Canadiens	1
1968–69	Glenn Hall	St. Louis Blues	3
1968–69	Jacques Plante	St. Louis Blues	7
1969–70	Tony Esposito	Chicago Black Hawks	1
1970–71	Eddie Giacomin	New York Rangers	1
1970–71	Gilles Villemure	New York Rangers	1
1971–72	Tony Esposito	Chicago Black Hawks	2
1971–72	Gary Smith	Chicago Black Hawks	1
1972–73	Ken Dryden	Montreal Canadiens	1
1973–74	Tony Esposito	Chicago Black Hawks	3
1973–74	Bernie Parent	Philadelphia Flyers	1
1974–75	Bernie Parent	Philadelphia Flyers	2
1975–76	Ken Dryden	Montreal Canadiens	2
1976–77	Ken Dryden	Montreal Canadiens	3
1976–77	Michel Larocque	Montreal Canadiens	1
1977–78	Ken Dryden	Montreal Canadiens	4
1977–78	Michel Larocque	Montreal Canadiens	2
1978–79	Ken Dryden	Montreal Canadiens	5
1978–79	Michel Larocque	Montreal Canadiens	3
1979–80	Don Edwards	Buffalo Sabres	1
1979–80	Bob Sauve	Buffalo Sabres	1
1980–81	Denis Herron	Montreal Canadiens	1
1980–81	Michel Larocque	Montreal Canadiens	4
1980–81	Richard Sevigny	Montreal Canadiens	1

=== 1981–present ===
The NHL adopted the current criteria for the Vezina Trophy beginning in 1981–82. The William M. Jennings Trophy was created as a new award for the goaltender(s) playing 25 or more games for the team allowing the fewest goals against.

^ Player is still active in the NHL
† Player's team won the Stanley Cup
* Player elected to the Hockey Hall of Fame
~ Player not yet eligible for the Hockey Hall of Fame

Season	Winner	Team	Win #
1981–82	Billy Smith*	New York Islanders†	1
1982–83	Pete Peeters	Boston Bruins	1
1983–84	Tom Barrasso*	Buffalo Sabres	1
1984–85	Pelle Lindbergh	Philadelphia Flyers	1
1985–86	John Vanbiesbrouck	New York Rangers	1
1986–87	Ron Hextall	Philadelphia Flyers	1
1987–88	Grant Fuhr*	Edmonton Oilers†	1
1988–89	Patrick Roy*	Montreal Canadiens	1
1989–90	Patrick Roy*	Montreal Canadiens	2
1990–91	Ed Belfour*	Chicago Blackhawks	1
1991–92	Patrick Roy*	Montreal Canadiens	3
1992–93	Ed Belfour*	Chicago Blackhawks	2
1993–94	Dominik Hasek*	Buffalo Sabres	1
1994–95	Dominik Hasek*	Buffalo Sabres	2
1995–96	Jim Carey	Washington Capitals	1
1996–97	Dominik Hasek*	Buffalo Sabres	3
1997–98	Dominik Hasek*	Buffalo Sabres	4
1998–99	Dominik Hasek*	Buffalo Sabres	5
1999–2000	Olaf Kolzig	Washington Capitals	1
2000–01	Dominik Hasek*	Buffalo Sabres	6
2001–02	Jose Theodore	Montreal Canadiens	1
2002–03	Martin Brodeur*	New Jersey Devils†	1
2003–04	Martin Brodeur*	New Jersey Devils	2
2004–05	Season cancelled due to the 2004–05 NHL lockout		
2005–06	Miikka Kiprusoff	Calgary Flames	1
2006–07	Martin Brodeur*	New Jersey Devils	3
2007–08	Martin Brodeur*	New Jersey Devils	4
2008–09	Tim Thomas	Boston Bruins	1
2009–10	Ryan Miller	Buffalo Sabres	1
2010–11	Tim Thomas	Boston Bruins†	2
2011–12	Henrik Lundqvist*	New York Rangers	1
2012–13	Sergei Bobrovsky^	Columbus Blue Jackets	1
2013–14	Tuukka Rask	Boston Bruins	1
2014–15	Carey Price*	Montreal Canadiens	1
2015–16	Braden Holtby	Washington Capitals	1
2016–17	Sergei Bobrovsky^	Columbus Blue Jackets	2
2017–18	Pekka Rinne*	Nashville Predators	1
2018–19	Andrei Vasilevskiy^	Tampa Bay Lightning	1
2019–20	Connor Hellebuyck^	Winnipeg Jets	1
2020–21	Marc-Andre Fleury~	Vegas Golden Knights	1
2021–22	Igor Shesterkin^	New York Rangers	1
2022–23	Linus Ullmark^	Boston Bruins	1
2023–24	Connor Hellebuyck^	Winnipeg Jets	2
2024–25	Connor Hellebuyck^	Winnipeg Jets	3
2025–26	Andrei Vasilevskiy^	Tampa Bay Lightning	2

== See also ==
- List of National Hockey League awards
- List of NHL players
- List of NHL statistical leaders
