= Richard Sévigny =

Canadian ice hockey player

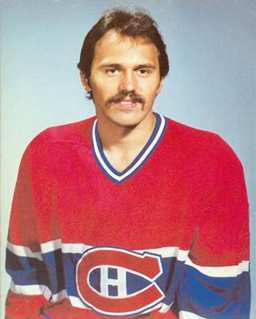
- Born: April 11, 1957 (age 69) Montreal, Quebec, Canada
- Height: 5 ft 8 in (173 cm)
- Weight: 178 lb (81 kg; 12 st 10 lb)
- Position: Goaltender
- Caught: Left
- Played for: Montreal Canadiens; Quebec Nordiques
- NHL draft: 124th overall, 1977; Montreal Canadiens
- Playing career: 1977–1990

Joseph Francis Richard Sévigny (born April 11, 1957) is a Canadian former professional ice hockey goaltender who played for the Montreal Canadiens and Quebec Nordiques in the National Hockey League (NHL). He then moved to France to be coach of Chamonix HC (1989–90), Diables Rouges de Briançon (1990–91) and Angers (1994–95), and then returned to the Ligue Nord-Américaine de Hockey. He is noted for being the last Montreal Canadien to wear #33 prior to Patrick Roy.

== Playing career ==
Before making the NHL, Sevigny played for 5 different teams. He spent his junior career in the QMJHL with the Granby Vicks and the Sherbrooke Castors. In 1976, Sevigny was selected to the QMJHL West First All-Star Team by playing in 55 games and posting a 3.85 GAA. His strong play made Team Canada notice him and he was selected to play in the 1976 World Junior Ice Hockey Championships where he won a silver medal. Sevigny's play at the international level caught the attention of the Montreal Canadiens and in 1977, he was selected 124th overall in the 1977 NHL amateur draft. The Canadiens also picked seven other goalies creating some competition to join the roster.

In 1978, Sevigny played for the Kalamazoo Wings in the IHL. He played in 35 games and recorded a 3.01 GAA, good enough to be selected to the Second All-Star Team. He then spent the next season in the AHL, with the Springfield Indians, and the Nova Scotia Voyageurs.

In the 1979 Stanley Cup Final, Michel Larocque was scheduled to start game two. Larocque was injured during the pre-game warm up and Sevigny was dressed as a backup in his place. The Canadiens would win that year and Sevigny's name was engraved on the Stanley Cup before ever playing an NHL game.

With Ken Dryden retiring in the off-season in 1979, spots opened up on the Canadiens roster. Sevigny attended training camp and played well enough to start in eleven regular season games in the 1979-80 season. The following season, he played in 33 games, won 20 of them and had a league best 2.40 GAA. He won the Vezina Trophy along with Denis Herron and Michel Larocque with Montreal that season. On April 20, 1984, Sevigny took part in the "Vendredi Saint" brawl against the Quebec Nordiques. The two benches cleared twice during the game and delayed the game for more than an hour. Sevigny fought the Nordiques' backup goalie Clint Malarchuk and was given a game misconduct.

The next two seasons saw Sevigny post back to back winning records but he was not offered a contract by the Canadiens. They released him and he was quickly picked up by the Quebec Nordiques. He signed a four-year deal and spent the next three seasons with the Nordiques and their AHL affiliate, the Fredericton Express before finishing his career in France in 1990.

Richard Sévigny
Medal record

Representing Canada

Men's ice hockey

World Junior Championships
Silver medal – second place	1976 Finland	Ice hockey

== Retirement ==
According to hockey lore, Sevigny was quoted as saying that Guy Lafleur would have Wayne Gretzky in his back pocket during the 1981 playoffs, a quote that motivated the Oilers team to victory over the fabled Habs. Sevigny has involved himself in old-timers charity hockey games and has coached the semi-pro Verdun Dragons.

== Awards and achievements ==
- Selected to the QMJHL First All-Star Team in 1976.
- Selected to the IHL Second All-Star Team in 1978.
- Stanley Cup championship in 1979.
- Vezina Trophy winner in 1981 (shared with Michel Larocque and Denis Herron).

== Career statistics ==
=== Regular season and playoffs ===
			Regular season									Playoffs
Season	Team	League	GP	W	L	T	MIN	GA	SO	GAA	SV%	GP	W	L	MIN	GA	SO	GAA	SV%
1974–75	Granby Vicks	QJHL	50	—	—	—	2966	240	2	4.85	—	—	—	—	—	—	—	—	—
1974–75	Sherbrooke Castors	QMJHL	2	—	—	—	62	4	0	3.87	.895	—	—	—	—	—	—	—	—
1975–76	Sherbrooke Castors	QMJHL	55	—	—	—	3058	196	2	3.85	.874	15	—	—	797	56	0	4.22	.858
1976–77	Sherbrooke Castors	QMJHL	65	—	—	—	3656	248	2	4.07	.863	18	—	—	1058	60	2	3.40	.890
1976–77	Sherbrooke Castors	M-Cup	—	—	—	—	—	—	—	—	—	4	0	4	240	19	0	4.75	—
1977–78	Kalamazoo Wings	IHL	35	—	—	—	1897	95	1	3.01	—	7	—	—	296	12	0	2.43	—
1978–79	Springfield Indians	AHL	22	6	12	3	1302	77	0	3.55	—	—	—	—	—	—	—	—	—
1978–79	Nova Scotia Voyageurs	AHL	20	12	6	1	1169	57	1	2.93	—	10	5	5	607	37	0	3.66	—
1979–80	Montreal Canadiens	NHL	11	5	4	2	632	31	0	2.94	.900	—	—	—	—	—	—	—	—
1979–80	Nova Scotia Voyageurs	AHL	35	17	12	4	2104	114	3	3.25	—	4	1	3	239	15	0	3.77	—
1980–81	Montreal Canadiens	NHL	33	20	4	3	1777	71	2	2.40	.908	3	0	3	180	13	0	4.33	.845
1981–82	Montreal Canadiens	NHL	19	11	4	2	1027	53	0	3.10	.892	—	—	—	—	—	—	—	—
1982–83	Montreal Canadiens	NHL	38	15	11	8	2130	122	1	3.44	.883	1	0	0	28	0	0	0.00	1.000
1983–84	Montreal Canadiens	NHL	40	16	18	2	2203	124	1	3.38	.869	—	—	—	—	—	—	—	—
1984–85	Quebec Nordiques	NHL	20	10	6	2	1104	62	1	3.37	.874	—	—	—	—	—	—	—	—
1985–86	Quebec Nordiques	NHL	11	3	5	1	468	33	0	4.23	.864	—	—	—	—	—	—	—	—
1985–86	Fredericton Express	AHL	6	3	3	0	362	21	0	3.48	.881	—	—	—	—	—	—	—	—
1986–87	Quebec Nordiques	NHL	4	0	2	0	144	11	0	4.58	.804	—	—	—	—	—	—	—	—
1986–87	Fredericton Express	AHL	16	4	10	0	884	62	0	4.21	.876	—	—	—	—	—	—	—	—
1987–88	Fredericton Express	AHL	1	0	0	0	16	2	0	7.50	.600	—	—	—	—	—	—	—	—
1989–90	Chamonix HC	FRA-2	—	—	—	—	—	—	—	—	—	—	—	—	—	—	—	—	—
1990–91	HC Briançon	FRA	—	—	—	—	—	—	—	—	—	—	—	—	—	—	—	—	—
AHL totals			100	42	43	7	5837	333	4	3.42	—	14	6	8	846	52	0	3.69	—
NHL totals			176	80	54	20	9485	507	5	3.21	.884	4	0	3	208	13	0	3.75	.859

=== International ===
Year	Team	Event	GP	W	L	T	MIN	GA	SO	GAA
1976	Canada	WJC	4	—	—	—	226	23	0	6.10

"Sévigny's stats". The Goaltender Home Page.

Preceded by Don Edwards and Bob Sauve	Winner of the Vezina Trophy with Denis Herron and Michel Larocque; 1981	Succeeded by Billy Smith
