= William M. Jennings Trophy =

Ice hockey award

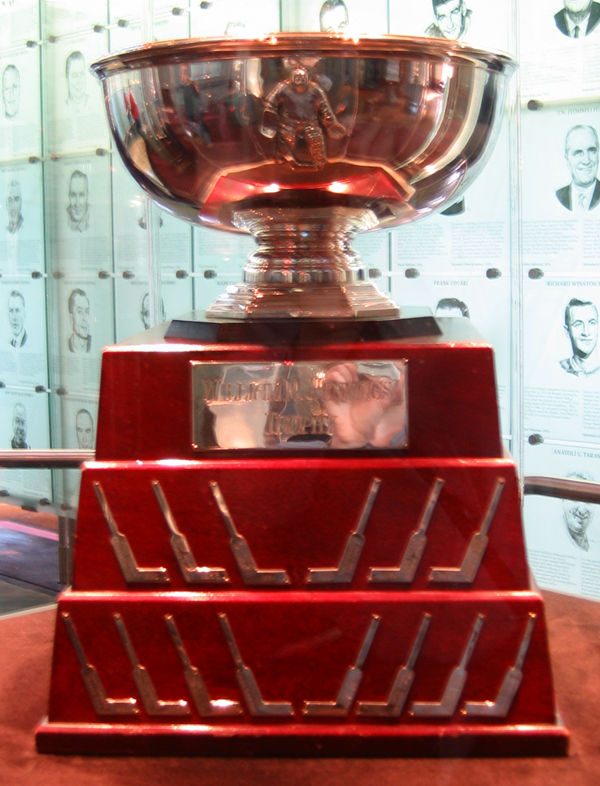
- Sport: Ice hockey
- Awarded for: National Hockey League goaltender(s) that have played for the team that allows the fewest goals scored against it.

History
- First award: 1981–82 NHL season
- First winner: Denis Herron and Rick Wamsley
- Most wins: Martin Brodeur and Patrick Roy (5)
- Most recent: Mackenzie Blackwood and Scott Wedgewood; Colorado Avalanche

The William M. Jennings Trophy is an annual National Hockey League (NHL) award given to "the goaltender(s) having played a minimum of 25 games for the team with the fewest goals scored against it ... based on regular-season play." Despite the flawed wording from the NHL definition, it means the goaltender with the lowest goals against average (per game), not the goaltender with the true lowest number of goals scored against them. From 1946 until 1981, the Vezina Trophy had been awarded under that definition, but it was later changed and replaced by the Jennings Trophy. It is named in honor of William M. Jennings, the longtime governor and president of the New York Rangers. Since its beginnings in 1982, it has been awarded at the end of 40 seasons to 44 different players; mostly in tandems of two goaltenders.

The most recent winners are Mackenzie Blackwood and Scott Wedgewood of the Colorado Avalanche. The Avalanche had a league-low 197 team goals-against in the 2025–26 season.

== History ==
From 1946 until the 1980–81 season, the Vezina Trophy was awarded to the goaltender(s) of the NHL team allowing the fewest goals during the regular season. However, it was recognized that this system often meant the trophy went to the goaltender of the better team rather than the individual and was changed to offer the trophy to the most outstanding goaltender, as voted by the NHL general managers. The William M. Jennings Trophy was created as a replacement and is awarded to the starting goaltender(s) playing for the team with the fewest goals against.

The Jennings Trophy was donated by the NHL's board of governors and first presented at the conclusion of the 1981–82 season. It is named in honor of the late William M. Jennings, who was a longtime governor and president of the New York Rangers and a builder of ice hockey in the United States. Normally the minimum number of games a goaltender must play to be eligible for the trophy is 25, but for the lockout shortened 1994–95 season, the required minimum was fourteen games.

Ten players have won both the Jennings and Vezina Trophy for the same season: Patrick Roy (1988–89 and 1991–92), Ed Belfour (1990–91 and 1992–93), Dominik Hasek (1993–94 and 2000–01), Martin Brodeur (2002–03, 2003–04), Miikka Kiprusoff (2005–06), Tim Thomas (2008–09), Carey Price (2014–15), Marc-Andre Fleury (2020–21), Linus Ullmark (2022–23), and Connor Hellebuyck (2023–24 and 2024–25). Roy and Brodeur have won the trophy five times each, the most of any goaltenders. Belfour is third, having won four times. The Montreal Canadiens have the most wins, with six, followed by the New Jersey Devils and the Chicago Blackhawks with five each, the Boston Bruins with four, and the Buffalo Sabres with three.

== Winners ==
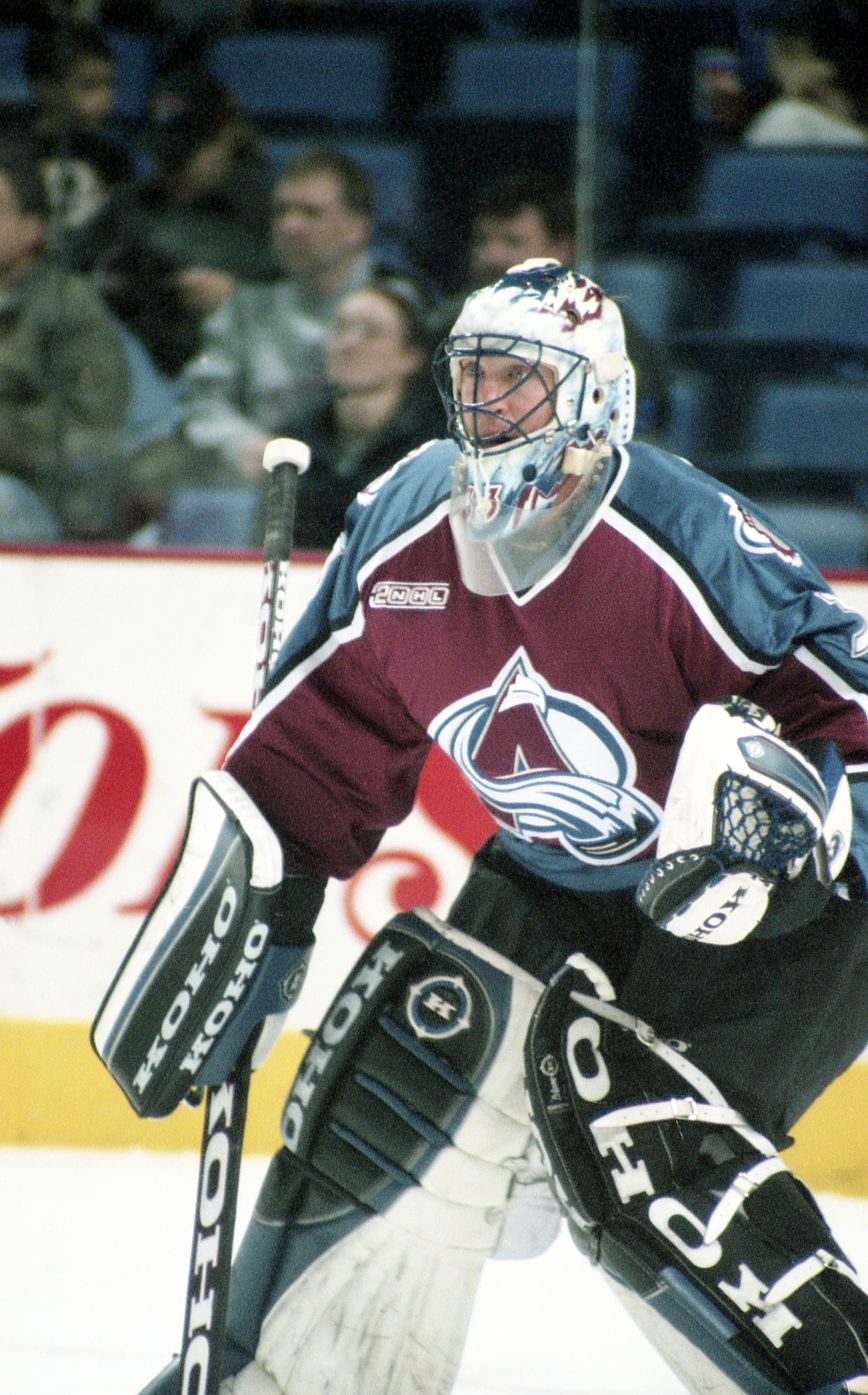
Patrick Roy, five-time winner

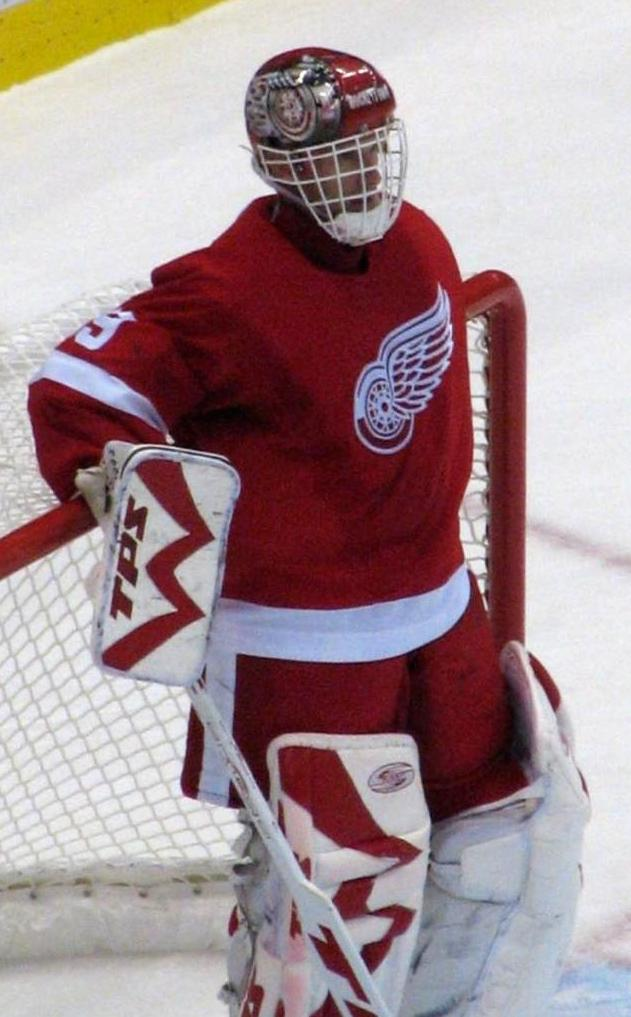
Dominik Hasek, three-time winner

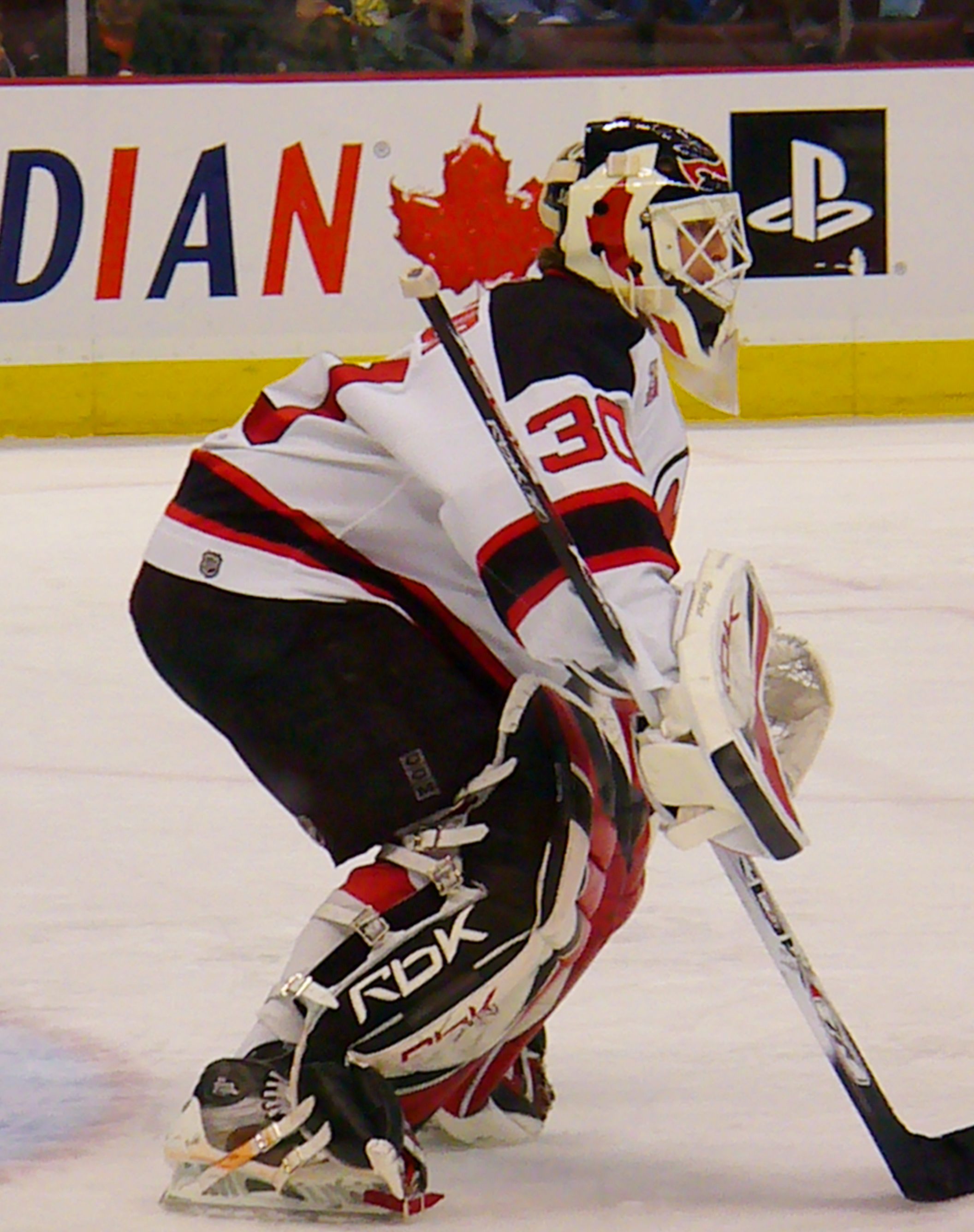
Martin Brodeur, five-time winner

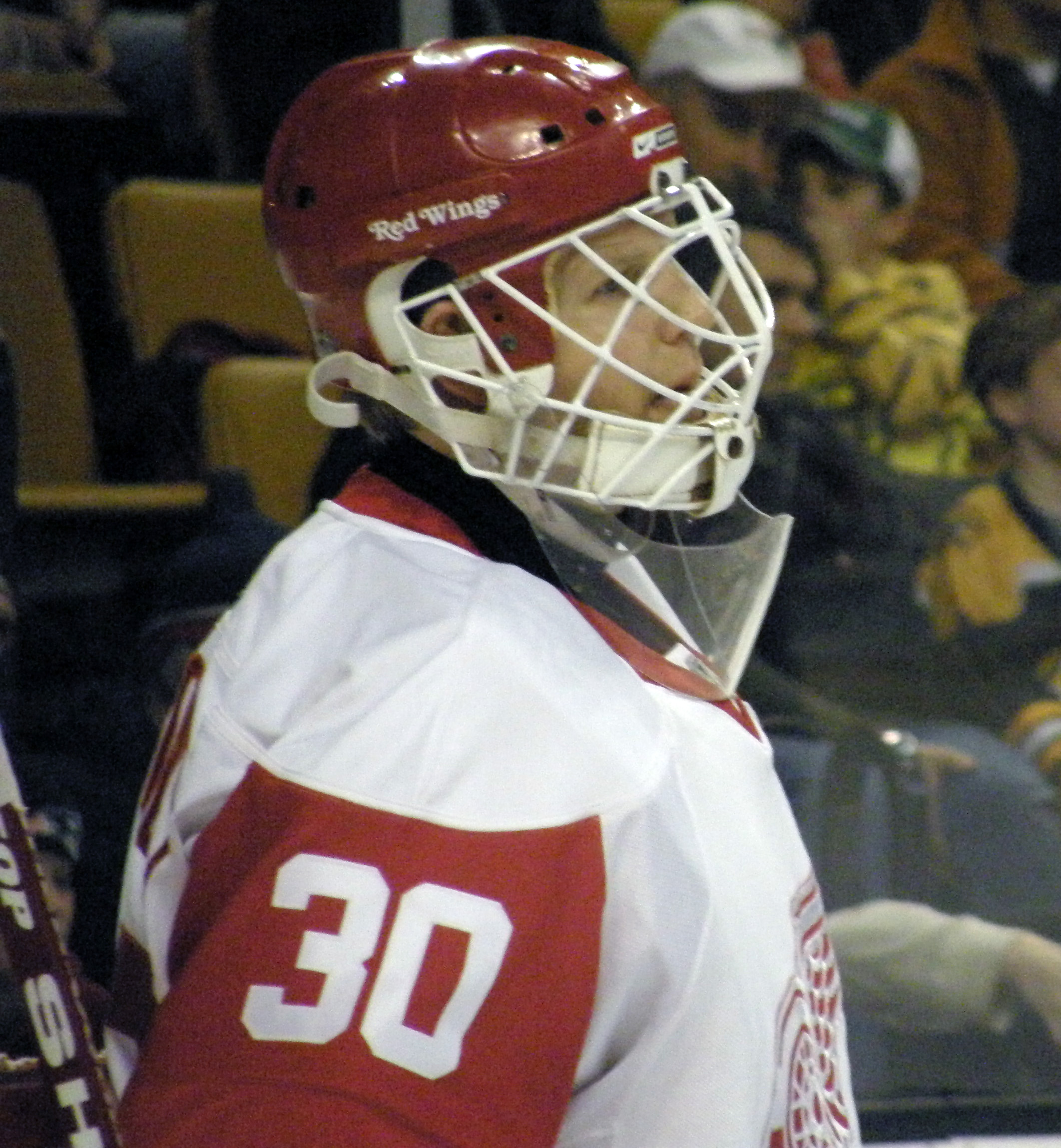
Chris Osgood, two-time winner

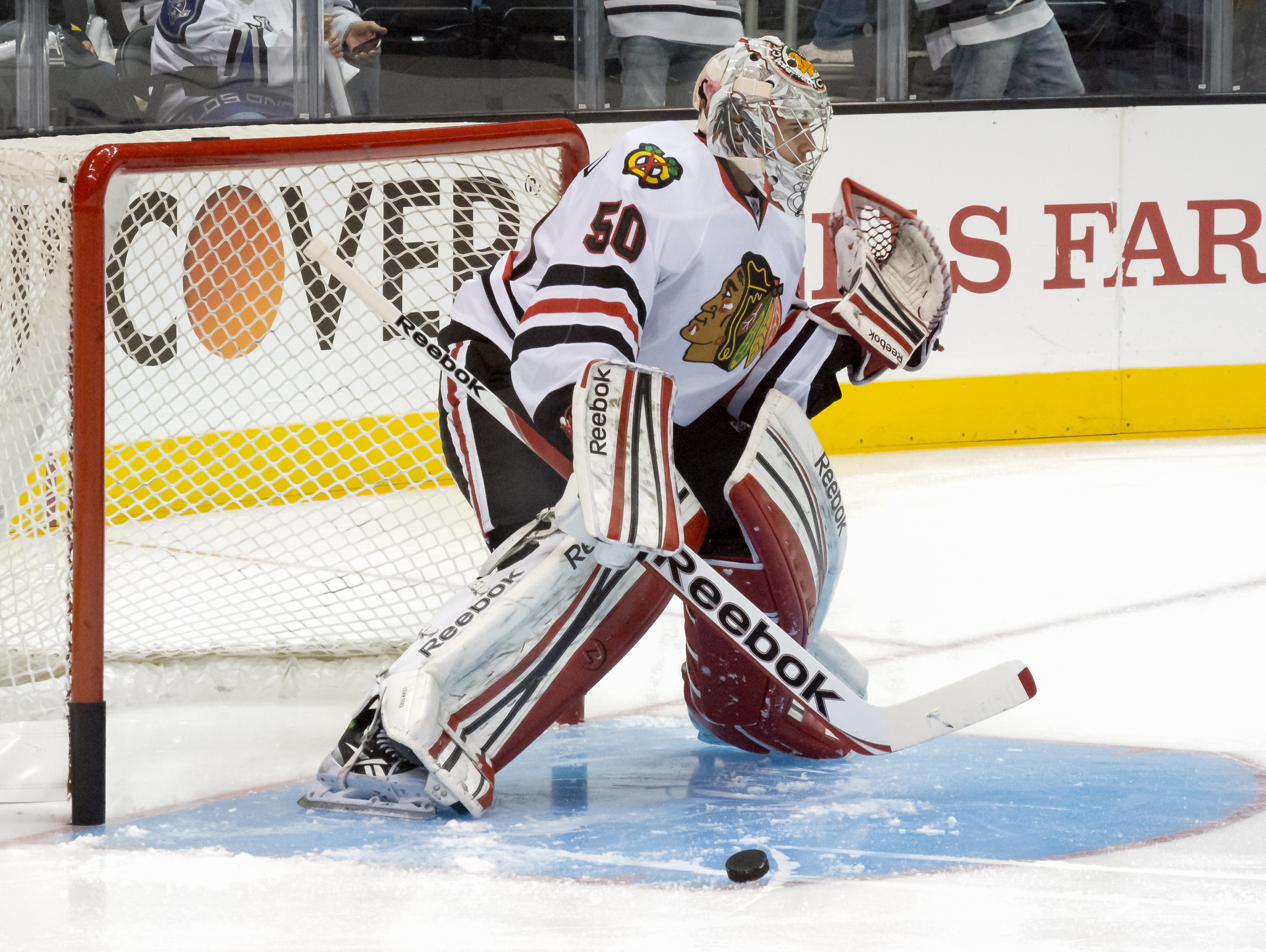
Corey Crawford, two-time winner

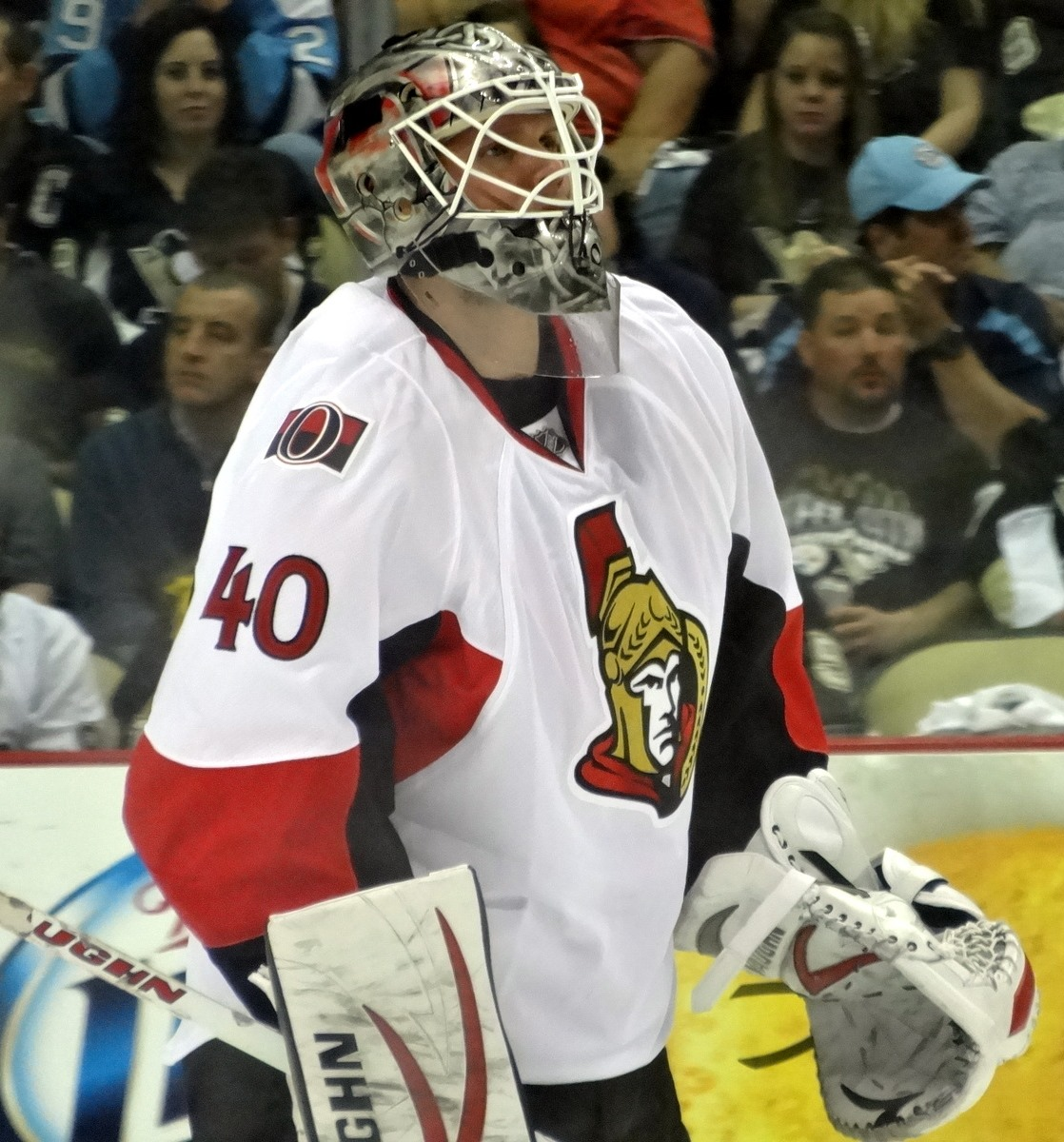
Robin Lehner, two-time winner

^ Player is still active
† Player's team won the Stanley Cup
* Player elected to the Hockey Hall of Fame
~ Player not yet eligible for the Hockey Hall of Fame

Bold Player with the fewest goals ever scored against in a Jennings' winning season. (Note: Corey Crawford and Ray Emery hold the record for fewest goals scored against in a season, however this was in a lockout shortened season. Martin Brodeur has the fewest goals scored against in a full-length season.)

William M. Jennings Trophy winners
Season	Winner	Team	Goals allowed	Win #	Team Win #
1981–82	Rick Wamsley	Montreal Canadiens	223	1	1
1981–82	Denis Herron	Montreal Canadiens	223	1	1
1982–83	Billy Smith*	New York Islanders	226	1	1
1982–83	Roland Melanson	New York Islanders	226	1	1
1983–84	Al Jensen	Washington Capitals	226	1	1
1983–84	Pat Riggin	Washington Capitals	226	1	1
1984–85	Tom Barrasso*	Buffalo Sabres	237	1	1
1984–85	Bob Sauve	Buffalo Sabres	237	1	1
1985–86	Bob Froese	Philadelphia Flyers	241	1	1
1985–86	Darren Jensen	Philadelphia Flyers	241	1	1
1986–87	Patrick Roy*	Montreal Canadiens	241	1	2
1986–87	Brian Hayward	Montreal Canadiens	241	1	2
1987–88	Patrick Roy*	Montreal Canadiens	238	2	3
1987–88	Brian Hayward	Montreal Canadiens	238	2	3
1988–89	Patrick Roy*	Montreal Canadiens	218	3	4
1988–89	Brian Hayward	Montreal Canadiens	218	3	4
1989–90	Andy Moog	Boston Bruins	232	1	1
1989–90	Rejean Lemelin	Boston Bruins	232	1	1
1990–91	Ed Belfour*	Chicago Blackhawks	211	1	1
1991–92	Patrick Roy*	Montreal Canadiens	207	4	5
1992–93	Ed Belfour*	Chicago Blackhawks	239	2	2
1993–94	Dominik Hasek*	Buffalo Sabres	218	1	2
1993–94	Grant Fuhr*	Buffalo Sabres	218	1	2
1994–95 (Note: Season shortened by the 1994–95 NHL lockout)	Ed Belfour*	Chicago Blackhawks	115	3	3
1995–96	Chris Osgood	Detroit Red Wings	181	1	1
1995–96	Mike Vernon*	Detroit Red Wings	181	1	1
1996–97	Martin Brodeur*	New Jersey Devils	182	1	1
1996–97	Mike Dunham	New Jersey Devils	182	1	1
1997–98	Martin Brodeur*	New Jersey Devils	166	2	2
1998–99	Ed Belfour*	Dallas Stars†	168	4	1
1998–99	Roman Turek	Dallas Stars†	168	1	1
1999–2000	Roman Turek	St. Louis Blues	165	2	1
2000–01	Dominik Hasek*	Buffalo Sabres	184	2	3
2001–02	Patrick Roy*	Colorado Avalanche	169	5	1
2002–03 (Note: For the 2002–03 season, there was a tie between Martin Brodeur of the New Jersey Devils and Robert Esche and Roman Cechmanek of the Philadelphia Flyers. This is the first time that there has been a tie between players from different teams.)	Martin Brodeur*	New Jersey Devils†	166	3	3
2002–03	Roman Cechmanek	Philadelphia Flyers	166	1	2
2002–03	Robert Esche	Philadelphia Flyers	166	1	2
2003–04	Martin Brodeur*	New Jersey Devils	164	4	4
2004–05 (Note: Not awarded due to the lockout)	—	—	—	—	—
2005–06	Miikka Kiprusoff	Calgary Flames	200	1	1
2006–07	Niklas Backstrom	Minnesota Wild	191	1	1
2006–07	Manny Fernandez	Minnesota Wild	191	1	1
2007–08	Dominik Hasek*	Detroit Red Wings†	184	3	2
2007–08	Chris Osgood	Detroit Red Wings†	184	2	2
2008–09	Tim Thomas	Boston Bruins	196	1	2
2008–09	Manny Fernandez	Boston Bruins	196	2	2
2009–10	Martin Brodeur*	New Jersey Devils	191	5	5
2010–11	Roberto Luongo*	Vancouver Canucks	185	1	1
2010–11	Cory Schneider~	Vancouver Canucks	185	1	1
2011–12	Brian Elliott~	St. Louis Blues	165	1	2
2011–12	Jaroslav Halak~	St. Louis Blues	165	1	2
2012–13 (Note: Season shortened by the 2012–13 NHL lockout)	Corey Crawford	Chicago Blackhawks†	102	1	4
2012–13	Ray Emery	Chicago Blackhawks†	102	1	4
2013–14	Jonathan Quick~	Los Angeles Kings†	174	1	1
2014–15 (Note: For the 2014–15 season, there was a tie between Carey Price of the Montreal Canadiens and Corey Crawford of the Chicago Blackhawks. This is the second time that there has been a tie between players from different teams.)	Corey Crawford	Chicago Blackhawks†	189	2	5
2014–15	Carey Price*	Montreal Canadiens	189	1	6
2015–16	Frederik Andersen^	Anaheim Ducks	192	1	1
2015–16	John Gibson^	Anaheim Ducks	192	1	1
2016–17	Braden Holtby	Washington Capitals	182	1	2
2017–18	Jonathan Quick~	Los Angeles Kings	203	2	2
2018–19	Thomas Greiss~	New York Islanders	191	1	2
2018–19	Robin Lehner	New York Islanders	191	1	2
2019–20 (Note: Season shortened by the COVID-19 pandemic)	Tuukka Rask	Boston Bruins	174	1	3
2019–20	Jaroslav Halak~	Boston Bruins	174	2	3
2020–21 (Note: Season delayed and shortened by the COVID-19 pandemic)	Marc-Andre Fleury~	Vegas Golden Knights	124	1	1
2020–21	Robin Lehner	Vegas Golden Knights	124	2	1
2021–22	Frederik Andersen^	Carolina Hurricanes	202	2	1
2021–22	Antti Raanta~	Carolina Hurricanes	202	1	1
2022–23	Linus Ullmark^	Boston Bruins	177	1	4
2022–23	Jeremy Swayman^	Boston Bruins	177	1	4
2023–24	Connor Hellebuyck^	Winnipeg Jets	199	1	1
2024–25	Connor Hellebuyck^	Winnipeg Jets	191	2	2
2025–26	Mackenzie Blackwood^	Colorado Avalanche	197	1	2
2025–26	Scott Wedgewood^	Colorado Avalanche	197	1	2

== See also ==
- List of National Hockey League awards
- List of NHL statistical leaders

== Bibliography ==
- "William M. Jennings Trophy history". National Hockey League. Archived from the original on June 28, 2010.
- "William M. Jennings Trophy history". Legends of Hockey. Archived from the original on August 7, 2007.
- "Final Standings". National Hockey League. Archived from the original on April 3, 2009.
