= Bob Sauvé =

Canadian ice hockey player (born 1955)

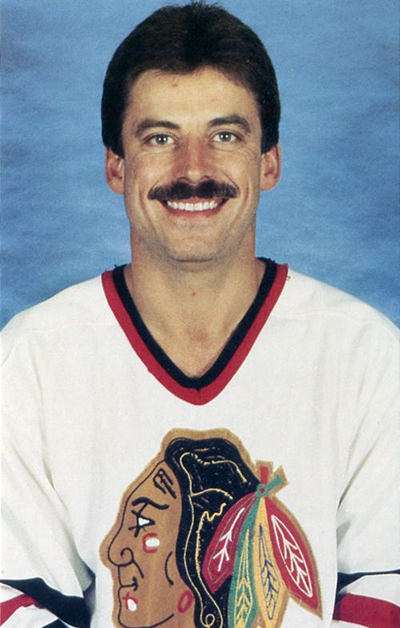
- Sauve in 1986 photo
- Born: June 17, 1955 (age 71) Sainte-Geneviève, Quebec, Canada
- Height: 5 ft 8 in (173 cm)
- Weight: 165 lb (75 kg; 11 st 11 lb)
- Position: Goaltender
- Caught: Left
- Played for: Buffalo Sabres; Detroit Red Wings; Chicago Blackhawks; New Jersey Devils
- NHL draft: 17th overall, 1975; Buffalo Sabres
- WHA draft: 16th overall, 1975; Cincinnati Stingers
- Playing career: 1976–1989

Robert F. Sauvé (born June 17, 1955) is a Canadian former professional ice hockey goaltender.

== Early life ==
Sauvé was born in Sainte-Geneviève, Quebec. As a youth, he played in the 1967 Quebec International Pee-Wee Hockey Tournament with a minor ice hockey team from North Shore.

== Career ==
After a successful junior career with the Quebec Major Junior Hockey League's Laval National, Sauvé was drafted by the NHL's Buffalo Sabres in the first round (17th overall) in 1975 NHL entry draft. The World Hockey Association's Cincinnati Stingers also selected Sauvé in round 2 (16th overall) in the 1975 WHA Amateur Draft, but his ambition was to play in the NHL. The Sabres selected three goaltenders in the 1975 draft, with Sauvé and Don Edwards being the most notable. Sauvé played four games for the Sabres during the 1976–77 season but spent the majority of the year with the AHL's Rhode Island Reds. The next season saw Sauvé split time with the Hershey Bears and the Sabres as Edwards' backup.

As the 1978–79 season began, Sauvé entered training camp determined to make the NHL for good. He suffered a broken finger and began the season in Hershey. After Edwards suffered a sprained ankle, Sauvé was called up to Buffalo, this time to stay. The goaltending duo of Sauvé and Edwards had an immediate impact on the Sabres. Sauvé led the league in goals against average for the 1979–80 season and was co-recipient of the Vezina Trophy with Edwards in the same season.

Sauvé was traded to the Detroit Red Wings on December 2, 1981, but re-signed with the Sabres as a free agent on June 8, 1982, after Edwards was traded to the Calgary Flames. Sauvé was joined in net by a young phenom just out of high school named Tom Barrasso for the 1983–84 season, and the duo went on to share the William M. Jennings Trophy for fewest goals allowed in 1984–85. Sauvé was dealt by Buffalo to the Chicago Black Hawks in exchange for a third-round pick in the 1986 NHL entry draft. Sauvé spent two uneventful seasons in Chicago before signing with the New Jersey Devils as a free agent on July 10, 1987. After two seasons in New Jersey, Sauvé announced his retirement from the NHL in 1989 due to chronic back problems.

Sauvé remained active in hockey after retirement, first as the president of the New Jersey Devils' alumni association, then as a goalie coach and later as a player agent. His list of clients includes Patrick Roy, Vincent Lecavalier, Jocelyn Thibault, Pierre Turgeon, Vincent Damphousse and Simon Gagné.

== Personal life ==
Sauvé's younger brother, forward Jean-François Sauvé, also played in the NHL and was briefly a teammate of his older brother in Buffalo. His son Philippe Sauvé was a professional goaltender who played in the NHL and in Europe for the Hamburg Freezers. His nephew Maxime Sauvé was an NHL hockey forward.

== Awards and achievements ==
- Selected to the QMJHL First All-Star Team in 1974.
- Vezina Trophy winner in 1980 (shared with Don Edwards).
- William M. Jennings Trophy winner in 1985 (shared with Tom Barasso).

== Career statistics ==
Bold indicates led league

| | | | Regular season | | | | | | | | | Playoffs |
| Season | Team | League | GP | W | L | T | MIN | GA | SO | GAA | SV% | GP | W | L | MIN | GA | SO | GAA | SV% |
|---|---|---|---|---|---|---|---|---|---|---|---|---|---|---|---|---|---|---|---|
| 1971–72 | Verdun Maple Leafs | QMJHL | 34 | — | — | — | 2020 | 202 | 0 | 6.00 | .851 | 2 | 0 | 2 | 120 | 12 | 0 | 6.00 | .836 |
| 1972–73 | Laval National | QMJHL | 35 | — | — | — | 2100 | 224 | 0 | 6.40 | .850 | 3 | — | — | 160 | 20 | 0 | 7.50 | .856 |
| 1973–74 | Laval National | QMJHL | 61 | — | — | — | 3620 | 341 | 0 | 5.65 | .867 | 11 | — | — | 660 | 60 | 0 | 5.45 | .869 |
| 1974–75 | Laval National | QMJHL | 57 | — | — | — | 3403 | 287 | 0 | 5.06 | .876 | 16 | — | — | 960 | 81 | 0 | 5.06 | .872 |
| 1975–76 | Providence Reds | AHL | 14 | 5 | 8 | 1 | 848 | 44 | 0 | 3.11 | — | — | — | — | — | — | — | — | — |
| 1975–76 | Charlotte Checkers | SHL | 17 | — | — | — | 979 | 36 | 2 | 2.21 | .937 | 7 | — | — | 420 | 10 | 2 | 1.43 | — |
| 1976–77 | Buffalo Sabres | NHL | 4 | 1 | 2 | 0 | 184 | 11 | 0 | 3.59 | .845 | — | — | — | — | — | — | — | — |
| 1976–77 | Rhode Island Reds | AHL | 25 | — | — | — | 1346 | 94 | 0 | 4.14 | .878 | — | — | — | — | — | — | — | — |
| 1976–77 | Hershey Bears | AHL | 9 | — | — | — | 539 | 38 | 0 | 4.23 | — | — | — | — | — | — | — | — | — |
| 1977–78 | Buffalo Sabres | NHL | 11 | 6 | 2 | 0 | 480 | 20 | 0 | 2.50 | .912 | — | — | — | — | — | — | — | — |
| 1977–78 | Hershey Bears | AHL | 16 | 4 | 6 | 3 | 872 | 59 | 0 | 4.05 | — | — | — | — | — | — | — | — | — |
| 1978–79 | Buffalo Sabres | NHL | 29 | 10 | 10 | 7 | 1610 | 100 | 0 | 3.73 | .876 | 3 | 1 | 2 | 181 | 9 | 0 | 2.98 | .883 |
| 1978–79 | Hershey Bears | AHL | 5 | 3 | 2 | 0 | 278 | 14 | 0 | 3.02 | — | — | — | — | — | — | — | — | — |
| 1979–80 | Buffalo Sabres | NHL | 32 | 20 | 8 | 4 | 1880 | 74 | 4 | **2.36** | .901 | 8 | 6 | 2 | 501 | 17 | **2** | **2.04** | .926 |
| 1980–81 | Buffalo Sabres | NHL | 35 | 16 | 10 | 9 | 2100 | 111 | 2 | 3.17 | .880 | — | — | — | — | — | — | — | — |
| 1981–82 | Buffalo Sabres | NHL | 14 | 6 | 1 | 5 | 760 | 35 | 0 | 2.76 | .893 | — | — | — | — | — | — | — | — |
| 1981–82 | Detroit Red Wings | NHL | 41 | 11 | 25 | 4 | 2365 | 165 | 0 | 4.19 | .846 | — | — | — | — | — | — | — | — |
| 1982–83 | Buffalo Sabres | NHL | 54 | 25 | 20 | 7 | 3110 | 179 | 1 | 3.45 | .872 | 10 | 6 | 4 | 545 | 28 | **2** | 3.08 | .881 |
| 1983–84 | Buffalo Sabres | NHL | 40 | 22 | 13 | 4 | 2375 | 138 | 0 | 3.49 | .869 | 2 | 0 | 1 | 41 | 5 | 0 | 7.32 | .643 |
| 1984–85 | Buffalo Sabres | NHL | 27 | 13 | 10 | 3 | 1564 | 84 | 0 | 3.22 | .855 | — | — | — | — | — | — | — | — |
| 1985–86 | Chicago Black Hawks | NHL | 38 | 19 | 13 | 2 | 2099 | 138 | 0 | 3.94 | .886 | 2 | 0 | 2 | 99 | 8 | 0 | 4.85 | .869 |
| 1986–87 | Chicago Blackhawks | NHL | 46 | 19 | 19 | 5 | 2660 | 159 | 1 | 3.59 | .894 | 4 | 0 | 4 | 245 | 15 | 0 | 3.67 | .890 |
| 1987–88 | New Jersey Devils | NHL | 34 | 10 | 16 | 3 | 1798 | 107 | 0 | 3.57 | .870 | 5 | 2 | 1 | 236 | 13 | 0 | 3.30 | .890 |
| 1988–89 | New Jersey Devils | NHL | 15 | 4 | 5 | 1 | 721 | 56 | 0 | 4.66 | .832 | — | — | — | — | — | — | — | — |
| NHL totals | | | 420 | 182 | 154 | 54 | 23,706 | 1377 | 8 | 3.49 | .875 | 34 | 15 | 16 | 1848 | 95 | 4 | 3.08 | .891 |

"Sauvé's stats". The Goaltender Home Page.

| Preceded by Lee Fogolin | Buffalo Sabres first-round draft pick 1975 | Succeeded by Ric Seiling |
| Preceded by Ken Dryden; Michel Larocque | Winner of the Vezina Trophy; 1980; With: Don Edwards | Succeeded by Denis Herron, Michel Larocque and Richard Sevigny |
