= Billy Smith (ice hockey) =

Canadian ice hockey player (born 1950)

- Hockey Hall of Fame, 1993
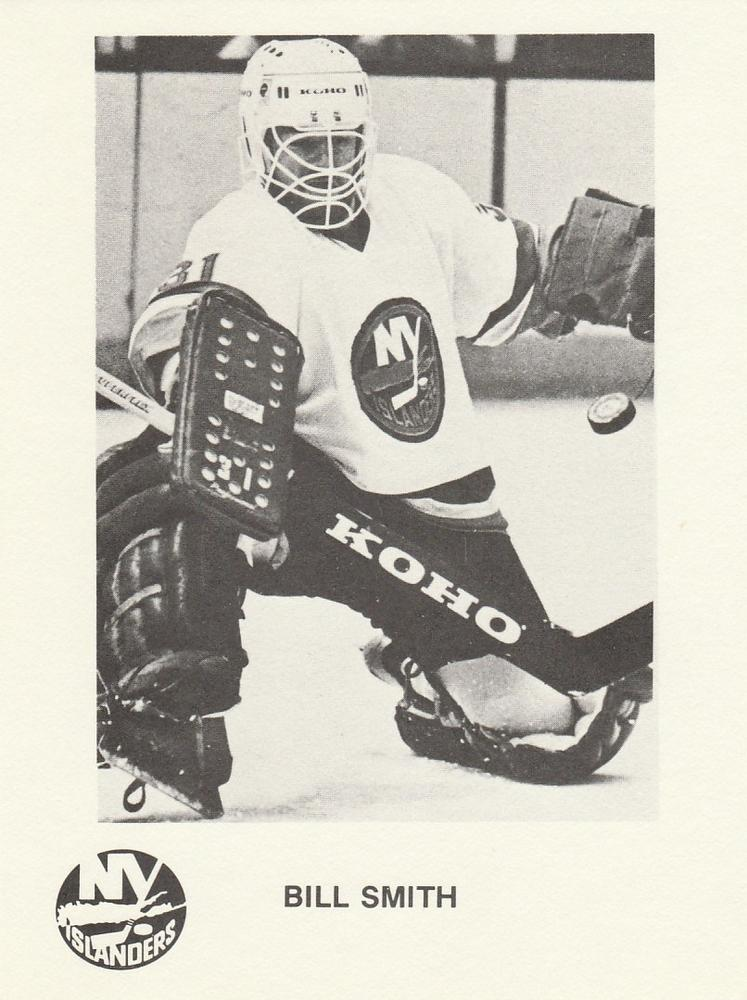
- Smith with the New York Islanders in 1983
- Born: December 12, 1950 (age 75) Perth, Ontario, Canada
- Height: 5 ft 10 in (178 cm)
- Weight: 175 lb (79 kg; 12 st 7 lb)
- Position: Goaltender
- Caught: Left
- Played for: Los Angeles Kings; New York Islanders
- National team: Canada
- NHL draft: 59th overall, 1970; Los Angeles Kings
- Playing career: 1970–1989

William John Smith (born December 12, 1950) is a Canadian former professional ice hockey goaltender. Drafted by the Los Angeles Kings in 1970, Smith went through the minor leagues for two years before making his professional debut in 1972, where he won one of his five starts. In June of that year, he was drafted in the NHL Expansion Draft by the New York Islanders, where he would share duties for his first two seasons before becoming the primary goaltender in 1974, which would be the first of thirteen consecutive seasons where they would compete in the Stanley Cup playoffs.

On November 28 of the 1979–80 season, Smith became the first goaltender credited with scoring a goal. In 1980, Smith was the goaltender for 20 playoff games and won 15 of them as the Islanders won the first of four consecutive Stanley Cups. The 1981–82 season saw him win the Vezina Trophy in the first season where the trophy was given to the best all-around goaltender while the following season saw him win the William M. Jennings Trophy (alongside teammate Roland Melanson) in allowing the fewest number of goals for the season. He then won the Conn Smythe Trophy for his performance that year where he went 13–3 with three shutouts and goals against average (GAA) of 2.68 as the Islanders won their fourth and final Cup. In the 1987–88 season, Smith won his 300th career game to become only the 9th goaltender with 300 wins in NHL history; he retired in the following season.

In 132 combined starts in the Stanley Cup playoffs, Smith won 88 of them; upon his retirement, his 88 wins were the all-time leader in wins for a goaltender in the Stanley Cup playoffs. In 1993, he had his number retired by the Islanders and was inducted into the Hockey Hall of Fame. In 2017, Smith was named one of the 100 Greatest NHL Players in history.

== Early life ==
Smith was born in the town of Perth, Ontario. He attended the Perth District Collegiate Institute as a youth before beginning to play organized hockey in 1968. He cited his older brother Gordie as an inspiration, even starting out playing defense. However, when the team needed a goalie one day, Smith volunteered. He soon began to like playing the whole game and the attention for having a good game. In a game in December 1969 in Drummondville, Smith was ran into the crease by an opponent and decided to fight two opposing players that started a brawl, which led to several players ejected.

He spent one year in the QMJHL with the Cornwall Royals in 1969 and was drafted by the Los Angeles Kings in the 1970 NHL draft. He spent the next two seasons with the minor league affiliate with the Springfield Kings, where he had six combined shutouts and won the Calder Cup in 1971.

== Playing career ==
=== NHL beginnings ===
Smith was drafted by the Los Angeles Kings in the fifth round of the 1970 NHL Amateur Draft on June 11, 1970. After two seasons in the AHL, he made his NHL debut with the Kings on February 12, 1972, at the Montreal Forum; the Kings lost 6-5 to the Canadiens, with Smith facing 48 shots that afternoon, yielding the winning goal to Guy Lafleur with 22 seconds remaining in the game.

=== New York Islanders ===
Smith was drafted in the 1972 NHL Expansion Draft by the New York Islanders on June 6, 1972; he was the second player picked by the team. After sharing goaltending duties with Gerry Desjardins for two years, he got the starting job all to himself in the 1974–75 season when Desjardins bolted to the World Hockey Association. In that season, he led the Islanders to their first playoff appearance.

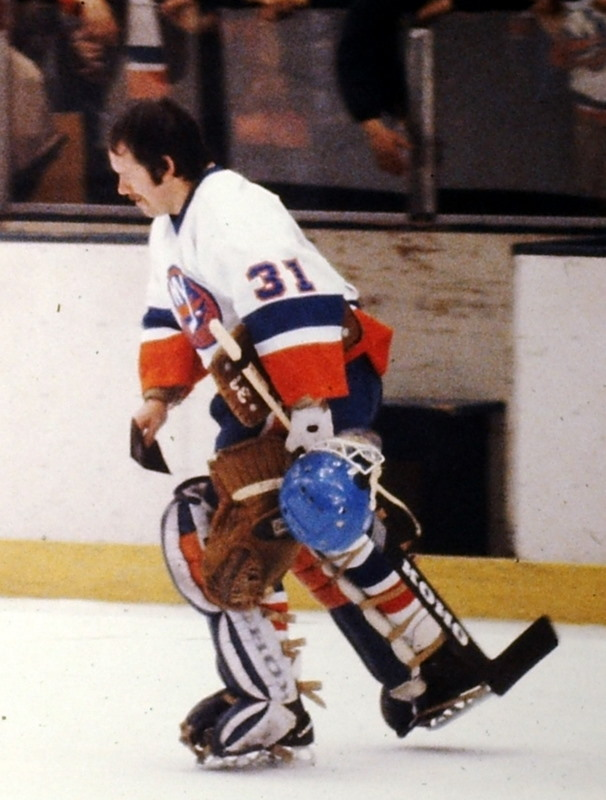
Smith with the New York Islanders

Smith played in the 1978 All-Star Game, of which he was named Most Valuable Player. For the next two seasons, he shared netminding duties with Chico Resch, with whom he formed perhaps the top goaltending duo in the NHL at the time. Smith was the first NHL goaltender to be credited with scoring a goal. On November 28, 1979, in a game between the Islanders and the Colorado Rockies, the Rockies took their goaltender off the ice for an extra attacker after a delayed penalty call was called on the Islanders. The puck deflected off Smith's chest protector into the corner. Rockies rookie Rob Ramage picked up the puck and accidentally made a blind pass from the corner boards in the opposing zone to the blue line. Nobody was there to receive the pass, and so the puck sailed all the way down the length of the ice and into the Rockies' net. As Smith had been the last Islanders player to touch the puck, he was credited with the goal.

In the 1980 playoffs, Smith played most of the games and helped the Islanders win the first of four consecutive Stanley Cups, firmly establishing him as the team's starting goaltender. Resch was dealt to the Colorado Rockies the following season on March 10, 1981. In the 1981–82 season, he was named a First Team All-Star and won the Vezina Trophy. The following season saw him and teammate Roland Melanson win the William M. Jennings Trophy for fewest goals allowed. He was chosen to play for Canada in the 1981 Canada Cup, but he was unable to play due to suffering a cracked left hand finger in practice.

Described as unappreciated for his achievements in 1984, Smith's regular season success was surpassed by his performances in the playoffs, as he helped the Islanders win four straight Stanley Cups (1980 to 1983), reach the finals five straight times (1980 to 1984), and win a record 19 consecutive playoff series from 1980 to 1984.

Smith was the first goalie to win the Stanley Cup wearing the helmet-and-cage combination mask, rather than the fiberglass mask which had been the standard since 1959. He switched to the helmet-and-cage in the 1978–79 season.

His single most famous game may be his 2–0 victory in the first game of the 1983 Stanley Cup Final against the Edmonton Oilers, shutting out the likes of Mark Messier, Wayne Gretzky, Jari Kurri, and Paul Coffey. The Islanders swept the Oilers in four games, with Smith allowing the Oilers only six goals and winning the Conn Smythe Trophy as Most Valuable Player in the playoffs. In 1984, Smith broke the record for the most playoff victories in a career: between 1980 and 1984 he led all goaltenders in playoff victories. In the 1984 Stanley Cup playoffs, in a best-of-five First Round where the team was trailing 0–2 to the Washington Capitals, Smith led the Islanders to three straight victories to advance. He attained his 300th win on March 20, 1988, doing so with a 6–0 shutout road win over the Winnipeg Jets at the Winnipeg Arena in Winnipeg, Manitoba.

With one year remaining on his contract but with an offer to become their goaltending coach, Smith announced his retirement on June 5, 1989; he was the last original Islander still on the team.

== Post-playing career ==
Smith spent four seasons as the goaltending coach for the Islanders. In 1993, followed longtime Islander general manager Bill Torrey to the expansion Florida Panthers as goaltending coach. He spent eight seasons with the team, rising to assistant coach by the time he departed the team in 2001. He became goaltending coach of the Islanders from 2001 to 2003. He was hired by the Barrie Colts to serve as Director of Goaltending in 2017, where he served until 2020.

== Legacy ==
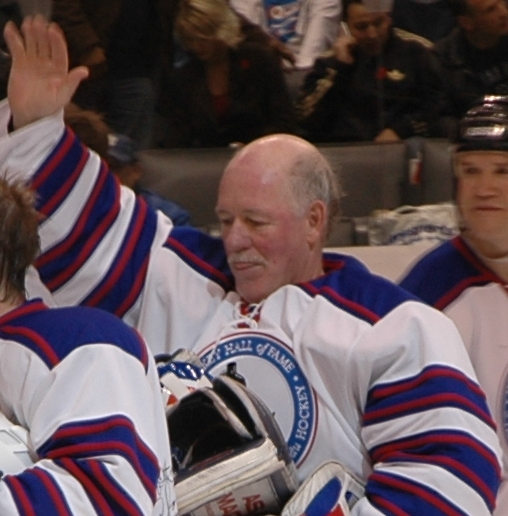
Smith in 2008

Nicknamed "Battlin' Billy" or "Hatchet Man" for his fiery temper and unabashed use of his stick or blocker on players crowding his crease, Smith excelled as a tough "money goalie" of his era. For much of his career, there were few restrictions on contact with goaltenders or entering the crease, so Smith felt he had to resort to these measures to protect himself. As such, forwards needed ankle guards to protect themselves. Smith was also noted for his displays of feigned injuries that would often lead to penalties against opponents, for whom he carried an undisguised enmity. In game four of the 1983 Stanley Cup Final, Glenn Anderson of the Edmonton Oilers collided with Smith and Smith dove upon the ice, resulting in referee Andy Van Hellemond handing a five-minute penalty to Anderson. Later Van Hellemond said that this was "making a bit of a fool of me", and when he officiated game one of the 1984 Final, a rematch of the Islanders and Oilers, he called no penalty when Smith and Anderson collided again. In the four Stanley Cup Final runs, he went 57–13 as a starter. In the playoff run from 1980 to 1984 where the team won nineteen consecutive playoff series, he went 68–18.

Smith refused to participate in the traditional handshakes between teams at the end of a playoff series. During one practice, teammate Mike Bossy fired a shot at Smith to which Smith took offence. Smith charged after Bossy with his stick but was tackled by teammates before Smith could take his frustrations out on Bossy. Bossy has noted that Smith never liked being talked to in the locker room, and kept an intense focus before and after games and practices, but was much more laid-back off the ice.

The Islanders retired his jersey number 31 on February 20, 1993. Later that year, he was inducted into the Hockey Hall of Fame. In 1998, he was ranked number 80 on The Hockey News' list of the 100 Greatest Hockey Players. In 2022, he was named by The Athletic as the 86th best player of the NHL modern era.

== Personal life ==
Smith has an older brother who also played in the NHL, Gord Smith. As of 2016, Smith has been married to his wife for over 40 years.

== Awards and achievements ==
- Calder Cup championship in 1971.
- Played in 1978 NHL All-Star Game.
- 1978 NHL All-Star Game MVP.
- Selected to the NHL First All-Star Team in 1982.
- Vezina Trophy winner in 1982.
- Conn Smythe Trophy winner in 1983.
- William M. Jennings Trophy winner in 1983 (shared with Roland Melanson).
- Stanley Cup championships in 1980, 1981, 1982, 1983.
- First NHL goalie to be credited with a goal in 1979.
- Inducted into the Hockey Hall of Fame in 1993.
- His #31 jersey was retired by the New York Islanders on February 20, 1993.
- In 1998, he was ranked number 80 on The Hockey News' list of the 100 Greatest Hockey Players.
- In 2016, he was inducted into his home town Perth and District Sports Hall of Fame.
- In 2017, he was listed on NHL's 100 Greatest Hockey Players

== Career statistics ==
=== Regular season and playoffs ===
Bold indicates led league

			Regular season									Playoffs
Season	Team	League	GP	W	L	T	MIN	GA	SO	GAA	SV%	GP	W	L	MIN	GA	SO	GAA	SV%
1968–69	Smiths Falls Bears	CCHL	—	—	—	—	—	—	—	—	—	—	—	—	—	—	—	—	—
1968–69	Hull Castors	M-Cup	—	—	—	—	—	—	—	—	—	3	—	—	130	16	0	7.38	—
1969–70	Cornwall Royals	QMJHL	55	—	—	—	2946	249	1	4.52	.887	6	—	—	360	14	1	2.33	.935
1970–71	Springfield Kings	AHL	49	19	20	6	2728	160	2	3.51	—	11	9	1	682	29	1	2.56	—
1971–72	Springfield Kings	AHL	28	24	3	1	1649	77	4	2.80	.882	4	1	2	192	13	0	4.06	—
1971–72	Los Angeles Kings	NHL	5	1	3	1	300	23	0	4.60	.871	—	—	—	—	—	—	—	—
1972–73	New York Islanders	NHL	37	7	24	3	2122	147	3	4.16	.878	—	—	—	—	—	—	—	—
1973–74	New York Islanders	NHL	46	9	23	12	2615	134	3	3.07	.897	—	—	—	—	—	—	—	—
1974–75	New York Islanders	NHL	58	21	18	**17**	3368	156	3	2.78	.904	6	1	4	333	23	0	4.14	.883
1975–76	New York Islanders	NHL	39	19	10	9	2254	98	3	2.61	.908	8	4	3	437	21	0	2.88	.892
1976–77	New York Islanders	NHL	36	21	8	6	2089	87	2	2.50	.916	10	7	3	580	27	0	2.79	.912
1977–78	New York Islanders	NHL	38	20	8	8	2154	85	2	2.65	.909	1	0	0	47	1	0	**1.28**	.929
1978–79	New York Islanders	NHL	40	25	8	4	2261	108	1	2.87	.899	5	4	1	315	10	**1**	**1.90**	**.932**
1979–80	New York Islanders	NHL	38	15	14	7	2114	104	2	2.95	.898	**20**	**15**	4	**1198**	**56**	1	2.80	.902
1980–81	New York Islanders	NHL	41	22	10	8	2363	129	2	3.28	.895	**17**	**14**	3	**994**	42	0	2.54	.904
1981–82	New York Islanders	NHL	46	**32**	9	4	2685	133	0	2.97	.900	**18**	**15**	3	**1120**	47	**1**	2.52	.906
1982–83	New York Islanders	NHL	41	18	14	7	2340	112	1	2.87	.906	**17**	**13**	3	962	43	**2**	2.68	**.912**
1983–84	New York Islanders	NHL	42	23	13	2	2279	130	2	3.42	.896	**21**	**12**	**8**	**1190**	**54**	0	2.72	.905
1984–85	New York Islanders	NHL	37	18	14	3	2090	133	0	3.82	.879	6	3	3	342	19	0	3.33	.896
1985–86	New York Islanders	NHL	41	20	14	4	2308	143	1	3.72	.881	1	0	1	60	4	0	4.00	.882
1986–87	New York Islanders	NHL	40	14	18	5	2252	132	1	3.52	.869	2	0	0	67	1	0	**0.90**	.955
1987–88	New York Islanders	NHL	38	17	14	5	2107	113	2	3.22	.893	—	—	—	—	—	—	—	—
1988–89	New York Islanders	NHL	17	3	11	0	730	54	0	3.22	.851	—	—	—	—	—	—	—	—
NHL totals			680	305	233	105	38,431	2,031	22	3.17	.894	132	88	36	7,645	348	6	2.73	.905

== See also ==
- List of NHL goaltenders with 300 wins
- List of goalscoring NHL goaltenders

Preceded by Mike Bossy	Winner of the Conn Smythe Trophy; 1983	Succeeded by Mark Messier
Preceded by Rick Wamsley and Denis Herron	Winner of the William M. Jennings Trophy (with Roland Melanson); 1983	Succeeded by Al Jensen and Pat Riggin
Preceded by Denis Herron, Michel Larocque, and Richard Sevigny	Winner of the Vezina Trophy; 1982	Succeeded by Pete Peeters
