= Michel Larocque =

Canadian ice hockey goaltender (1952–1992)

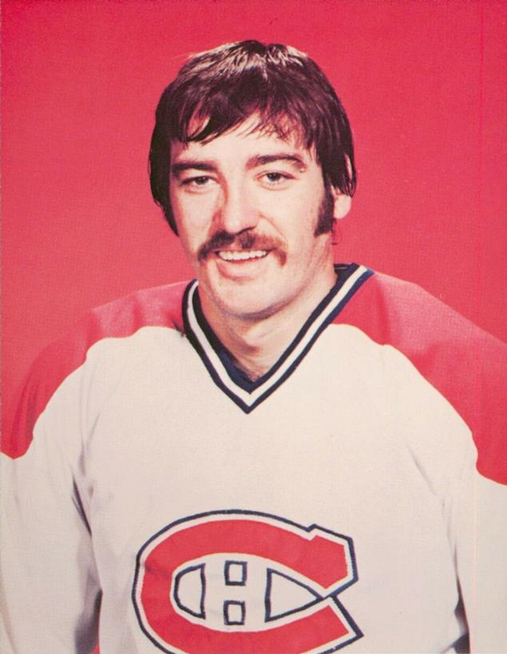
- Born: April 6, 1952 Hull, Quebec, Canada
- Died: July 29, 1992 (aged 40) Hull, Quebec, Canada
- Height: 5 ft 11 in (180 cm)
- Weight: 185 lb (84 kg; 13 st 3 lb)
- Position: Goaltender
- Caught: Left
- Played for: Montreal Canadiens; Toronto Maple Leafs; Philadelphia Flyers; St. Louis Blues
- NHL draft: 6th overall, 1972; Montreal Canadiens
- Playing career: 1972–1985

Michel Raymond "Bunny" Larocque (April 6, 1952 – July 29, 1992) was a Canadian professional ice hockey goaltender who played for the Montreal Canadiens, Toronto Maple Leafs, Philadelphia Flyers and St. Louis Blues in the National Hockey League (NHL). He was a four-time Stanley Cup winner with the Montreal Canadiens.

== Playing career ==
Larocque played junior hockey with the Ottawa 67's of the Ontario Hockey Association (OHA) from 1968 to 1972, and led the league in shutouts for the last three of those years. He was also one of the most penalized goalies, and was regularly involved in fights. In 1972, he was selected sixth overall by the Montreal Canadiens in the 1972 NHL Amateur Draft. In 1973 he played with the Nova Scotia Voyageurs of the American Hockey League (AHL), his first taste of professional hockey. For his outstanding play, Larocque was awarded the Hap Holmes Memorial Award with teammate Michel Deguise, and was selected to the Second All-Star Team.

Larocque started his National Hockey League (NHL) career in 1974 with the Canadiens. That was the season that Ken Dryden, one of the top goalies in that era, sat out in a contract dispute. Larocque shared playing time during the season with Michel Plasse and Wayne Thomas, but was the starting goalie in the playoffs. Dryden returned in 1975, and Larocque settled down as his back-up, sharing four Vezina Trophy wins, in an era when the award was given to the principal goalies on the team allowing the fewest goals in the regular season. The first three were largely because of Dryden's all-star play. In 1977, Larocque led the NHL with a 2.09 goals against average, but with Dryden ahead of him in the Canadiens net, he only managed to play 26 games. The Canadiens won four Stanley Cups during that stretch, but Larocque's only action in the playoff was for one period in the 1979 playoffs; Dryden was in front of the nets the rest of the time. The Stanley Cup wins were in 1976, 1977, 1978 and 1979.

In 1979, Dryden retired. Larocque saw more action as a result, and won his fourth and final Vezina Trophy, sharing duties with Richard Sévigny and newly-acquired Denis Herron in 1981. Near the trade deadline during that season, he was traded to the Toronto Maple Leafs for defenceman Robert Picard. Larocque played 50 games the following season with a struggling Leafs team. Larocque was in net when the Buffalo Sabres scored an NHL record of 9 goals in one period in a 14-4 game. He was again traded, this time to the Philadelphia Flyers in 1983, in return for goaltender Rick St. Croix, and finished his NHL career with the St. Louis Blues in 1984 after being sold by the Flyers, who had settled on Pelle Lindbergh in goal. Larocque retired from hockey in 1985 after playing 13 games with the Peoria Rivermen in the International Hockey League (IHL).

== Nickname ==
Larocque reputedly acquired the nickname "Bunny" as an infant. It was his mother's pet name for him which stuck for the rest of his life.

== Retirement and death ==
After his playing career ended, he served as general manager of the Victoriaville Tigres of the Quebec Major Junior Hockey League (QMJHL) during the 1989–90 season and won QMJHL executive of the year for 1989–90. He was vice president of the QMJHL during the 1991–92 season and still held the position at time of his death.

He died of brain cancer at age 40 in his hometown of Hull, Quebec.

== Awards and achievements ==
- Selected to the OHA-Jr. Second All-Star Team in 1971.
- Selected to the OHA-Jr. First All-Star Team in 1972.
- Hap Holmes Memorial Award winner in 1973 (shared with Michel Deguise).
- Selected to the AHL Second All-Star Team in 1973.
- Vezina Trophy winner in 1977, 1978 and 1979 (all shared with Ken Dryden); 1981 (shared with Denis Herron and Richard Sevigny).
- Stanley Cup championship in 1976, 1977, 1978, 1979.
- John Horman Trophy winner in 1990.

== Career statistics ==
=== Regular season and playoffs ===
			Regular season									Playoffs
Season	Team	League	GP	W	L	T	MIN	GA	SO	GAA	SV%	GP	W	L	T	MIN	GA	SO	GAA	SV%
1967–68	Ottawa 67's	OHA-Jr.	4	—	—	—	210	32	0	9.14	—	—	—	—	—	—	—	—	—	—
1968–69	Ottawa 67's	OHA-Jr.	4	—	—	—	190	24	0	7.58	—	—	—	—	—	—	—	—	—	—
1969–70	Ottawa 67's	OHA-Jr.	51	—	—	—	3060	185	3	3.63	—	11	4	6	1	625	36	3	3.46	—
1970–71	Ottawa 67's	OHA-Jr.	56	—	—	—	3345	189	5	3.39	—	—	—	—	—	—	—	—	—	—
1971–72	Ottawa 67's	OHA-Jr.	55	—	—	—	3287	189	4	3.45	—	18	8	7	3	1029	55	1	3.29	—
1972–73	Nova Scotia Voyageurs	AHL	47	—	—	—	2705	113	1	2.50	—	13	—	—	—	760	36	0	2.84	—
1973–74	Montreal Canadiens	NHL	27	15	8	2	1431	69	0	2.89	.908	6	2	4	—	364	18	0	2.97	.909
1974–75	Montreal Canadiens	NHL	25	17	5	3	1480	74	3	3.00	.891	—	—	—	—	—	—	—	—	—
1975–76	Montreal Canadiens	NHL	22	16	1	3	1220	50	2	2.46	.907	—	—	—	—	—	—	—	—	—
1976–77	Montreal Canadiens	NHL	26	19	2	4	1525	53	4	2.09	.910	—	—	—	—	—	—	—	—	—
1977–78	Montreal Canadiens	NHL	30	22	3	4	1729	77	1	2.67	.896	—	—	—	—	—	—	—	—	—
1978–79	Montreal Canadiens	NHL	34	22	7	4	1986	94	3	2.84	.888	1	0	0	—	20	0	0	0.00	1.000
1979–80	Montreal Canadiens	NHL	39	17	13	8	2259	125	3	3.32	.880	5	4	1	—	300	11	1	2.20	.923
1980–81	Montreal Canadiens	NHL	28	16	9	3	1623	82	1	3.03	.881	—	—	—	—	—	—	—	—	—
1980–81	Toronto Maple Leafs	NHL	8	3	3	2	460	40	0	5.22	.854	2	0	1	—	75	8	0	6.40	.750
1981–82	Toronto Maple Leafs	NHL	50	10	24	8	2647	207	0	4.69	.862	—	—	—	—	—	—	—	—	—
1982–83	Toronto Maple Leafs	NHL	16	3	8	3	835	68	0	4.89	.850	—	—	—	—	—	—	—	—	—
1982–83	Philadelphia Flyers	NHL	2	0	1	1	120	8	0	4.00	.857	—	—	—	—	—	—	—	—	—
1983–84	Springfield Indians	AHL	5	5	3	2	301	21	0	4.18	—	—	—	—	—	—	—	—	—	—
1983–84	St. Louis Blues	NHL	5	0	5	0	300	31	0	6.20	.811	—	—	—	—	—	—	—	—	—
1984–85	Peoria Rivermen	IHL	13	7	3	3	786	41	0	3.13	—	—	—	—	—	—	—	—	—	—
NHL totals			312	160	89	45	17,615	978	17	3.33	.882	14	6	6	—	759	37	1	2.92	.903

"Larocque's stats". The Goaltender Home Page.

Preceded by Steve Shutt	Montreal Canadiens first-round draft pick 1972	Succeeded by Dave Gardner
Preceded by Ken Dryden	Winner of the Vezina Trophy with Ken Dryden; 1977, 1978, 1979	Succeeded by Don Edwards and Bob Sauve
Preceded by Don Edwards and Bob Sauve	Winner of the Vezina Trophy with Denis Herron and Richard Sevigny; 1981	Succeeded by Billy Smith
