= Denis Herron =

Canadian ice hockey player

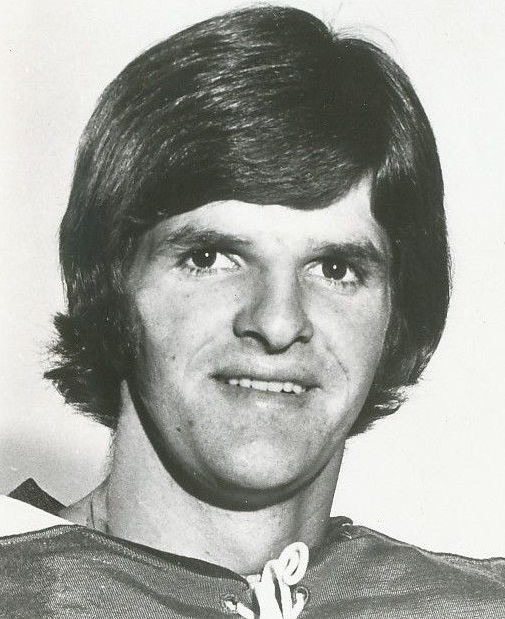
- Herron in 1973
- Born: June 18, 1952 (age 74) Chambly, Quebec, Canada
- Height: 5 ft 11 in (180 cm)
- Weight: 165 lb (75 kg; 11 st 11 lb)
- Position: Goaltender
- Caught: Left
- Played for: Pittsburgh Penguins; Kansas City Scouts; Montreal Canadiens
- National team: Canada
- NHL draft: 40th overall, 1972; Pittsburgh Penguins
- Playing career: 1972–1986

Denis Bernard Herron (born June 18, 1952) is a Canadian former professional ice hockey goaltender who played for the Montreal Canadiens, Kansas City Scouts, and Pittsburgh Penguins in the National Hockey League (NHL) from 1972 to 1985. He won the William M. Jennings Trophy with Rick Wamsley in 1982.

== Playing career ==
Herron played junior hockey with the Trois-Rivières Ducs of the Quebec Junior Hockey League. He had a good junior career and in 1972, he was named to the Second All-Star Team with the Trois-Rivières Ducs. In 1972, Herron was drafted 40th overall by the Pittsburgh Penguins. In his first season, he split his time between the Penguins, and the Hershey Bears of the AHL. In 1974, Herron played for three teams. He played for the Pittsburgh Penguins, the Hershey Bears and the Salt Lake Golden Eagles. Next season, Herron played the first half of the season with the Pens and the Bears before being traded to the Kansas City Scouts. He played 22 games with them that season and spent another year in Kansas City before becoming a free agent.

While playing for Kansas City, Herron put himself on a diet consisting of high-protein milkshakes in an effort to gain size and strength. In January 1976, he was taken to Baptist Hospital in Kansas City after suffering a kidney stone believed to have been a result of the milkshakes. (Icing on the Plains: The Rough Ride of Kansas City's NHL Scouts, pp. 193–194)

He was signed by Pittsburgh again and played with them for the next three years. In 1978, Herron made an appearance with Team Canada in the World Championships where he won a bronze medal.

In 1979, the Penguins traded him to the Montreal Canadiens. He remained with the Canadiens for the next three years where he shared goaltending duties. In 1981, Herron was awarded the Vezina Trophy with teammates Michel Larocque and Richard Sevigny. In 1982, Herron shared the William M. Jennings Trophy with fellow netminder Rick Wamsley.

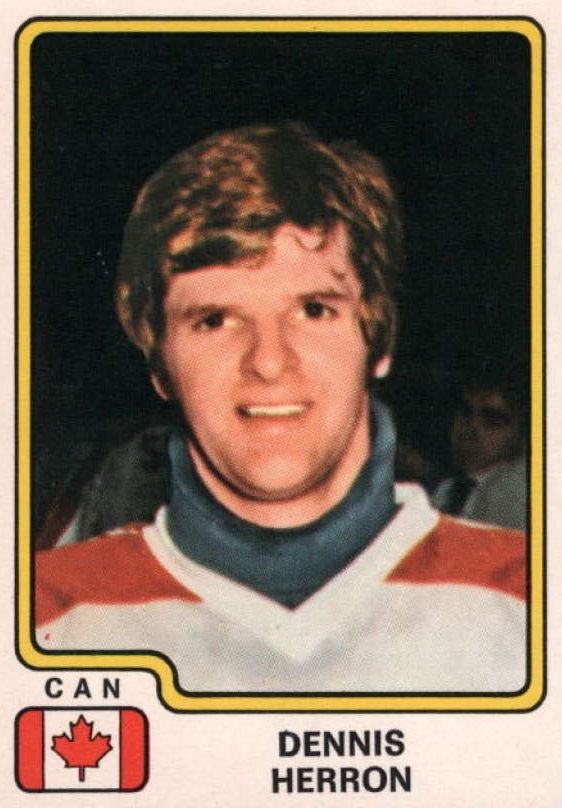
- Herron with Canadian national team in 1979

Medal record

Representing Canada

World Championships
Bronze medal – third place	1978 Czechoslovakia	

In 1983, Herron returned to Pittsburgh for the third time in his career. He remained there until 1986, when he retired.

== Personal life ==
Herron is the third of six children born to a mechanic with the Imperial Tobacco Company and a stay-at-home mother.

He is married to Debbie Pike, of St. Lambert Quebec and has two daughters, Elissa and Mandi.

His brother Ronald was also a professional goalie, having played in France, and his niece Catherine Herron tended nets for the women's Marlet team at McGill University. She also won the 2012 Clarkson Cup as a backup goaltender for the Montreal Stars of the CWHL

== Career statistics ==
=== Regular season and playoffs ===
			Regular season									Playoffs
Season	Team	League	GP	W	L	T	MIN	GA	SO	GAA	SV%	GP	W	L	MIN	GA	SO	GAA	SV%
1969–70	Trois-Rivières Ducs	QMJHL	2	0	1	0	96	10	0	6.25	.853	—	—	—	—	—	—	—	—
1970–71	Trois-Rivières Ducs	QMJHL	33	—	—	—	1,980	136	0	4.12	.886	7	—	—	420	23	1	3.29	.898
1971–72	Trois-Rivières Ducs	QMJHL	40	—	—	—	2,400	160	2	4.00	.898	4	—	—	200	19	0	5.70	.886
1972–73	Pittsburgh Penguins	NHL	18	6	7	2	967	55	2	3.41	.879	—	—	—	—	—	—	—	—
1972–73	Hershey Bears	AHL	21	—	—	—	1,185	63	0	3.19	—	4	—	—	240	16	0	4.00	—
1973–74	Pittsburgh Penguins	NHL	5	1	3	0	260	18	0	4.15	.885	—	—	—	—	—	—	—	—
1973–74	Salt Lake Golden Eagles	WHL	9	6	2	1	530	32	0	3.62	—	—	—	—	—	—	—	—	—
1973–74	Hershey Bears	AHL	17	10	4	1	967	52	0	3.22	—	4	4	0	242	7	0	1.73	—
1974–75	Hershey Bears	AHL	12	2	7	2	615	45	0	4.39	—	—	—	—	—	—	—	—	—
1974–75	Pittsburgh Penguins	NHL	3	1	1	0	108	11	0	6.11	.859	—	—	—	—	—	—	—	—
1974–75	Kansas City Scouts	NHL	22	4	13	4	1,280	80	0	3.75	.896	—	—	—	—	—	—	—	—
1975–76	Kansas City Scouts	NHL	64	11	39	11	3,620	243	0	4.03	.889	—	—	—	—	—	—	—	—
1976–77	Pittsburgh Penguins	NHL	34	15	11	5	1,920	94	1	2.94	.910	3	1	2	180	11	0	3.67	.903
1977–78	Pittsburgh Penguins	NHL	60	20	25	15	3,534	210	0	3.57	.901	—	—	—	—	—	—	—	—
1978–79	Pittsburgh Penguins	NHL	56	22	19	12	3,208	180	0	3.37	.892	7	2	5	421	24	0	3.42	.891
1979–80	Montreal Canadiens	NHL	34	25	3	3	1,909	80	0	2.51	.907	5	2	3	300	15	0	3.00	.891
1980–81	Montreal Canadiens	NHL	25	6	9	6	1,147	67	1	3.50	.878	—	—	—	—	—	—	—	—
1981–82	Montreal Canadiens	NHL	27	12	6	8	1,547	68	3	2.64	.912	—	—	—	—	—	—	—	—
1982–83	Pittsburgh Penguins	NHL	31	5	18	5	1,707	151	1	5.31	.838	—	—	—	—	—	—	—	—
1983–84	Pittsburgh Penguins	NHL	38	8	24	2	2,028	138	1	4.08	.885	—	—	—	—	—	—	—	—
1984–85	Pittsburgh Penguins	NHL	42	10	22	3	2,193	170	1	4.67	.875	—	—	—	—	—	—	—	—
1985–86	Pittsburgh Penguins	NHL	3	0	3	0	180	14	0	4.67	.848	—	—	—	—	—	—	—	—
1985–86	Baltimore Skipjacks	AHL	27	10	11	4	1,510	86	0	3.42	.892	—	—	—	—	—	—	—	—
NHL totals			462	146	203	76	25,608	1579	10	3.70	.889	15	5	10	901	50	0	3.33	.894

=== International ===
Year	Team	Event	GP	W	L	T	MIN	GA	SO	GAA	SV%
1978	Canada	WC	5	3	1	0	255	12	0	2.82	—

"Herron's stats". The Goaltender Home Page.

== Awards and achievements ==
- Selected to the QMJHL Second All-Star Team in 1972.
- Vezina Trophy winner in 1981 (shared with Michel Larocque and Richard Sevigny).
- William M. Jennings Trophy winner in 1982 (shared with Rick Wamsley).

Preceded by Don Edwards and Bob Sauve	Winner of the Vezina Trophy with Michel Larocque and Richard Sevigny; 1981	Succeeded by Billy Smith
Preceded by first winner	Winner of the William M. Jennings Trophy with Rick Wamsley; 1982	Succeeded by Billy Smith
