= 1987 Allan Cup =

Canadian senior ice hockey championship

The Allan Cup trophy

The 1987 Allan Cup was the Canadian senior ice hockey championship for the 1986–87 senior "AAA" season. The event was hosted by the Brantford Motts Clamatos in Brantford, Ontario. The 1987 playoff marked the 79th time that the Allan Cup has been awarded.

== Teams ==
- Brantford Motts Clamatos (Eastern Canadian Champions)
- Nelson Maple Leafs (Western Canadian Champions)

== Best-of-Seven Series ==
Brantford Motts Clamatos 10 - Nelson Maple Leafs 5
Brantford Motts Clamatos 5 - Nelson Maple Leafs 1
Brantford Motts Clamatos 6 - Nelson Maple Leafs 3
Brantford Motts Clamatos 7 - Nelson Maple Leafs 6 (OT)
