= Erin, Ontario =

Erin
- Town (lower-tier)
- Town of Erin
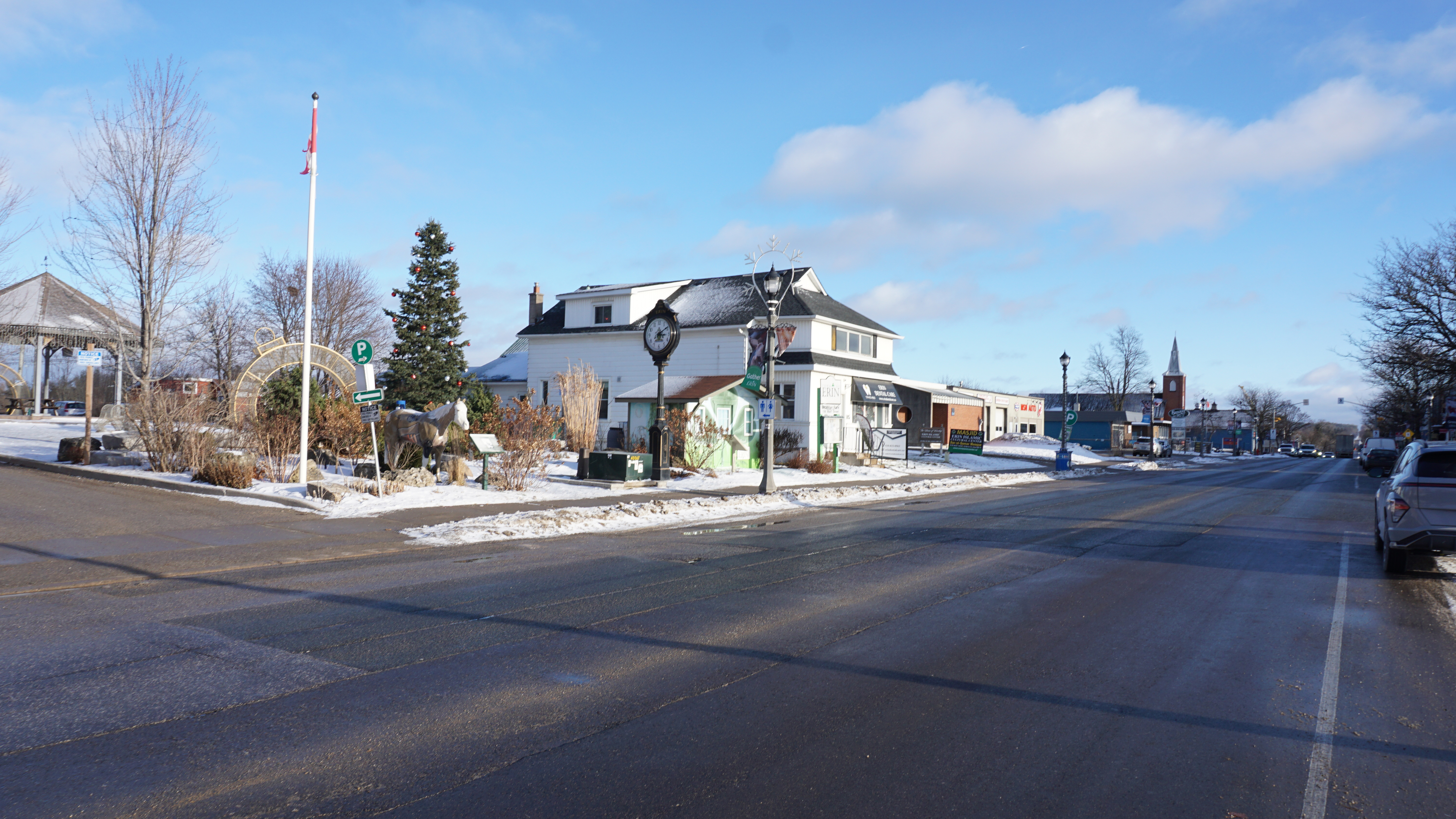
- Downtown Erin

- Seal

- Location of Erin within southern Ontario Erin (Southern Ontario)
- Coordinates: 43°46′N 80°04′W
- Country: Canada
- Province: Ontario
- County: Wellington
- Established: 1820
- Amalgamated: 1997

Government
  - Mayor: Michael Dehn
  - Governing Body: Town of Erin Council
  - MP: Mike Chong (Con)
  - MPP: Ted Arnott (PC)

Area
  - Town (lower-tier): 297.76 km^{2} (114.97 sq mi)
  - Urban: 4.03 km^{2} (1.56 sq mi)

Population (2016)
  - Town (lower-tier): 11,439
  - Density: 38.4/km^{2} (99/sq mi)
  - Urban: 2,647
  - Urban density: 656.1/km^{2} (1,699/sq mi)
- Time zone: UTC-5 (EST)
  - Summer (DST): UTC-4 (EDT)
- Postal Code FSA: N0B
- Area code: 519
- Website: www.erin.ca

Erin (/ˈɪərɪn/) is a town in Wellington County, approximately 80 kilometres (50 mi) northwest of Toronto, Ontario, Canada. Erin is bordered by the Town of Caledon, Ontario to the east, the Town of Halton Hills to the south, the Township of Guelph/Eramosa to the west and the Township of East Garafraxa to the north.

The amalgamated town is composed of the former villages of Erin and Hillsburgh, both urban centres now, as well as the former Township of Erin (which contained the hamlets of Ballinafad, Brisbane, Cedar Valley, Crewson's Corners, Ospringe and Orton). Erin's Town Council includes a Mayor and four councillors. Its upper tier government is provided by Wellington County.

Erin is primarily a rural community but, while farming is still an important activity in the town, most of its population works in the nearby cities of Brampton, Mississauga, Guelph, and even Toronto. The town's new industrial park is attracting a number of new industries, due to its cheaper tax rate, accessibility to transportation, and its location within the "Technology Triangle," a series of high-tech driven cities including nearby Kitchener, Waterloo and Cambridge.

The community not for profit organization is East Wellington Community Services.

== Communities ==
In addition to the primary settlement of Erin, the town also includes the smaller communities of Ballinafad, Brisbane, Cedar Valley, Crewson's Corners, Orton and Ospringe as well as Hillsburgh, an urban centre. The population in 2016 was 12,400. The town also includes rural cluster areas such as Binkham, Churchill (partially), Coningsby and Mimosa.

== History ==
The first settlers of European descent in the area then known as Erin Township were George and Nathaniel Roszel from Pennsylvania who arrived in November 1820; Nathanial acquired land in what is now Ballinafad. (Most of the settlers during the township's development were Scottish.) In 1821, William How and his family arrived from England and built a home in what is now Hillsburgh; he started the first general store in that community. The first Township Meeting was held on January 5, 1824; Henry Trout Sr. was appointed Town Clerk. The township halls have always been in or near Hillsburgh. The township population grew over the years from 1,368 in 1841, to 3,055 in 1850 when 15,400 acres were under cultivation.

The urban community now called Erin developed after mills were built on the Credit River between 1826 and 1829. The first settlers included Daniel MacMillan and the Trout family. The settlement was established as "MacMillan's Mills" although most sources indicate that the Trout family built the first sawmill. Even so, Daniel MacMillan and his brothers are acknowledged as significant contributors to the growth of the village.

By 1839 a post-office had opened. Records from 1841 indicate that the entire Township of Erin had a population of just 1,368. By 1846, the small settlement in the south-west of the township, then called McMillen's Mills, had a grist and saw mill, a tavern and blacksmith's shop but only 40 to 50 residents.

In 1849, the first place of worship, the Union Church was being used by several denominations. Previously, services had been held in homes and in other available buildings. By 1851, the population increased to 300; the name of the settlement was Erinsville at the time but was later shortened to Erin. Businesses in the area included a distillery, a tannery, and carding, oatmeal and grist-mills. The river provided the power for mills, helping to boost agriculture, milling and wood products manufacturing. By 1869 the population was 600 and the post office was receiving mail daily.

The Credit Valley Railway reached Erin in 1879 and the same year, Erin was incorporated as a village. At the time the population was 750.

Electricity from small private providers became available before 1890 and a formal power company was established in 1900, Cataract Light & Power. Hydro power was generated at Cataract, in Caledon, an area that is now in the Forks of the Credit Provincial Park. That facility was sold to Ontario Hydro in 1944 and continued to operate until 1947.

=== Organization of township schools ===
Before the village of Erin was organized in 1880, it had been constituted as School Section 2 in the Township. A separate school was only established in 1979.

Outside the village of Erin, the township was divided into 16 school sections, of which two were union sections straddling the boundary with East Garafraxa in Dufferin County.

School sections in Erin Township
S.S.	Formed	Name	School closed	Consolidation (1963-1965)		
S.S.	Formed	Name	School closed	Brisbane	Hillsburgh	Ospringe
1		Plugtown	1964	✓		
3	1837	Binkham	1961	✓		
4	1825	Ballinafad (Note: Known as the Peacock School)	1964	✓		
5	1845	Coningsby		✓		
6	1844	Hillsburgh			✓	
7		Cedarvale	1962	✓		
8	1851	Greenock School	1965			✓
9	1833	Awery's School	1963		✓	
10		Woodside Section	1965			✓
11	1833	North Erin, 9th Line	1960		✓	
12		May's School	1962		✓	
13	1845	Ospringe				✓
14	1840s	Mimosa	1965			✓
16	1900	Brisbane		✓		
U.S.S. 2	1892	Orton Village	1964		✓	
U.S.S. 15 (Note: Dissolved in 1963 upon formation of Erin Township School Board; portion in Dufferin County became S.S. 17, East Garafraxa)	1900		1964		✓	

== Demographics ==
Population history of the Town of Erin (post-amalgamation)
Year	Pop.	±%
1996	10,657	—
2001	10,657	+0.0%
2006	11,052	+3.7%
2011	11,148	+0.9%
2016	11,439	+2.6%

Population history of the Village of Erin (pre-amalgamation)
Year	Pop.	±%
1871	600	—
1921	479	−20.2%
1931	451	−5.8%
1941	499	+10.6%
1951	650	+30.3%
1961	1,005	+54.6%
1971	1,446	+43.9%
1981	2,313	+60.0%
1991	2,489	+7.6%
1996	2,633	+5.8%

In the 2021 Census of Population conducted by Statistics Canada, Erin had a population of 11,981 living in 4,220 of its 4,396 total private dwellings, a change of 4.7% from its 2016 population of 11,439. With a land area of 298.81 km^{2} (115.37 sq mi), it had a population density of 40.1/km^{2} (103.8/sq mi) in 2021.

Mother tongue (2006):

- English as first language: 91.4%
- French as first language: 1.1%
- English and French as first language: 0.4%
- Other as first language: 7.1%

== Culture ==
Erin revolves around its community centre, called Centre 2000. The building was added to the existing community centre. The facility now includes Erin District High School, 300-seat theatre, large double gym, arena, 6 vending machines, many community rooms, dentist, physiotherapist, Erin Branch of the Wellington Library, daycare, and many other features. Within the walls of Centre 2000 is Erin Cinema, located in the 300-seat theatre. It showed first run movies and Toronto Film Festival Circuit films on weekends and some weekdays before it was shut down in 2015. Erin Village Alliance Church meets occur at 155 Main Street. Another large part of Erin culture is the annual Erin Fall Fair, drawing hundreds of people every year.

== Government ==
The County of Wellington is Erin's upper tier government; as of early 2019, Pierre Brianceau was County Councillor, Wellington County. The Mayor of Erin is Michael Dehn. The town is located within the provincial riding of Wellington-Halton Hills, and the Member of Provincial Parliament is Joseph Racinsky. The federal riding is Wellington Halton Hills, and the Member of Parliament was Mike Chong.

== Health care ==
There are no hospitals located within Erin; services for residents are provided by Groves Memorial Community Hospital in Fergus, Ontario and by Guelph General Hospital. The East Wellington Family Health Team operates a clinic in the urban area of Erin and also in nearby Rockwood, Ontario. Some Erin residents are not far from the Headwaters Health Care Centre in Orangeville, Ontario.

== Education ==
Public schools in the County are operated by the Upper Grand District School Board while Catholic schools are operated by the Wellington Catholic District School Board. Schools within Erin include Ross R. MacKay Public School, Brisbane Public School, Erin Public School and Erin District High School. The only Catholic school is St. John Brebeuf Catholic School.

== Media ==
The town of Erin has their community radio station CHES-FM broadcasting at 91.7 FM. Their local newspaper The Erin Advocate has a weekly paid-circulation of 2,500 and is published by Metroland Media Group Ltd. The Erin Advocate also publishes the monthly Country Routes paper distributed to surrounding areas. Newspapers that cover Erin news and events and are distributed door to door for free include the Wellington Advertiser and the Orangeville Banner. Erin District High School has its own closed circuit TV station, primarily used for announcements, EDHS TV. Two other newspapers also cover Erin to some extent, The Independent (Georgetown) and The Halton Herald.

== Notable residents ==
=== Artists ===
- Paul Morin (1959 – ), winner of the Governor General's Award for English-language children's illustration with Orphan Boy in 1990
- Bill Reddick (1958 – ), artist who made Canada's Official State Dinnerware called the Maple Leaf Service in 2005

=== Athletes ===
- Zoe Bergermann (1994 – ), snowboarder who qualified for the 2018 Winter Olympics and 2022 Winter Olympics
- Terry Gregson (1953 – ), referee in the National Hockey League from 1979 – 2004 and Director of Officiating from 2009 – 2013
- Barbara J. Minshall (1953 – ), qualified for the Canadian dressage team at the 1976 Summer Olympics
- Blaine Schmidt (1963 – ), professional Canadian football player for the Edmonton Eskimos, Toronto Argonauts and Hamilton Tiger-Cats of the Canadian Football League
- Jeff Shevalier (1974 – ), professional ice hockey player for the Los Angeles Kings and Tampa Bay Lightning of the National Hockey League
- Bill Watkins (1858 – 1937), professional baseball player for the Indianapolis Hoosiers of the American Association in 1884
- Wilfred White (1900 – 1948), professional ice hockey player for the Pittsburgh Pirates, New York Americans and Philadelphia Quakers of the National Hockey League

=== Journalists ===
- Frank Orr (1936 – 2021), sports editor for the Toronto Star who won the Elmer Ferguson Memorial Award and was inducted into the Hockey Hall of Fame in 1989

=== Musicians ===
- Stompin' Tom Connors (1936 – 2013), musician best known for his songs "Sudbury Saturday Night", "Bud the Spud" and "The Hockey Song"

=== Politicians ===
- Otto Buchanan Elliott (1886 – 1979), one of the founding representatives of the Social Credit Party of Canada and member of the House of Commons of Canada from 1935 – 1940
- Nathaniel Given (1875 – 1950), member of the Legislative Assembly of Saskatchewan from 1929 – 1934
- W. W. Hiltz (1872 – 1936), 39th Mayor of Toronto from 1924 – 1925
- James Kirkwood (1845 – 1933), member of the Legislative Assembly of Ontario from 1891 – 1894
- Robert George Macpherson (1866 – 1926), member of the House of Commons of Canada from 1903 – 1907
- Peter Duncan McCallum (1853 – 1917), member of the Legislative Assembly of Ontario from 1893 – 1898
- Joseph Oliver (1852 – 1922), 34th Mayor of Toronto from 1908 – 1909
- Daniel Reed (1858 – 1935), member of the Legislative Assembly of Ontario from 1905 – 1911
- James Regan (1855 – 1927), member of the Legislative Assembly of Ontario from 1911 – 1919
- John Henry Haines Root (1908 – 1991), member of the Legislative Assembly of Ontario from 1951 – 1975
- Levi Thomson (1855 – 1938), member of the House of Commons of Canada from 1911 – 1921

=== Scholars ===
- Henry Alan Skinner (1899 – 1967), classical scholar who wrote The Origin of Medical Terms in 1949

=== Writers ===
- Robert Dickson (1944 – 2007), poet who won the Governor General's Award for French-language poetry in 2002
- Shane Neilson (1975 – ), author and poet who won Arc Poetry Magazine 15th annual Poem of the Year contest in 2010
- Sandy Pool )1981 - ), essayist and poet who was nominated for the Governor General's Award for Poetry (2010), Trillium Book Award (2012) and Alberta Book Award (2012)

== Arms ==
Coat of arms of Erin, Ontario

Notes
Granted 15 November 2021.
Crest
A demi-horse Proper its shoulder charged with a sun in splendour issuant from a mural crown Or charged with four shamrocks Vert.
Escutcheon
Vert a water wheel and in chief a stone lintel Or.
Supporters
Two great blue herons each holding in the beak a fish and standing on ploughed fields Proper set on barry wavy Argent and Azure.

== See also ==
- Element Yachts
- List of towns in Ontario
- List of townships in Ontario
- List of population centres in Ontario
