= John McCauley (disambiguation) =

John McCauley was a member of the RAAF.

John McCauley may also refer to:

- John McCauley (referee)
- John McCauley (American Revolutionary War), American Revolutionary War veteran
- John McCauley, American singer in Deer Tick (band)
- John McCauley (judge), a judge of the Ohio Supreme Court Commission
- Dr. John W. McCauley (virologist), former director of the Worldwide Influenza Centre at the Francis Crick Institute and co-chair of the scientific advisory board of GISAID
