= Boat building industry in Ontario =

Boat building has been a part of the history of Ontario, Canada for thousands of years. From the hand-crafted birch bark canoes of the indigenous people to modern factory-built speedboats, the construction of small boats for fishing, transportation and later water sports has been a widespread commercial activity in the province.

== History ==
A study of the geography of the province reveals the presence of over 250,000 lakes and a large number of connecting waterways. About 17% of the area inside the province's boundaries is covered by water. Until European settlers began constructing road systems, beginning in the late 1700s, most of what is now Ontario was covered with dense forest. Aside from footpaths through the woods, travel by water was the only practical choice.

=== Bark Canoes ===
The vehicle of choice for indigenous travelers was the bark canoe, a light wooden frame covered with bark, usually from the birch tree. The dugout canoe, popular in other areas of Canada, found limited use in this area; it was too heavy to be easily lifted over river rapids, and was also more time-consuming to construct.

The frames of the bark canoes were usually made of cedar, which was soaked in water to make it flexible, and then bent into shape. The frame pieces were tied together with boiled white pine roots. The frame was then covered with sections of birch bark, and the seams sealed with spruce or pine gum. Canoe-making skills were passed from generation to generation, and the boats were made in a variety of sizes and shapes.

When Europeans first came to the area, their large boats were not suitable for the untamed waterways, and the bark canoe was adopted for inland travel. Explorers and traders purchased or traded for canoes from aboriginal builders, and also began building their own in centres along popular trade routes, including at Fort William. Canoes continued to be the main means of inland water transportation until about 1820. One builder was L. A. Christopherson, who built canoes for the Hudson's Bay Company for 40 years. In areas where birch bark was scarce, canvas began to be used instead, both by traders and native boat builders.

Birch bark canoes are still hand made today by individual craftsmen.

=== Wooden Boats ===
With the building of sawmills along the many rivers, European boat building methods began to be adopted. Canoes, rowboats, skiffs, and other small boats began to be made with wooden planks, often of cedar, which resists rotting better than most other types of wood.

Canoes made of wooden planks instead of bark, called "board canoes" first began to appear in the 1850s, although it is not known which craftsman was the first to combine the native boat designs with "modern" technology of sawn and planed boards. In 1882, the Gidley Boat Works began manufacturing wooden plank boats on the shores of Georgian Bay.

One early builder of board or "cedar strip" canoes was Tom Gordon of Lakefield, near Peterborough. Over time, a number of boat-building companies grew up in the Peterborough area; one was the Peterborough Canoe Company. A long-time builder of plank-built boats was John William Stone, who set up a business building rowboats at Rat Portage (Kenora) in 1897. By 1906 the Stone Boat Company was also building duck boats, sailing canoes, ice boats, rowing shells, and barges.

Beginning in the early 1900s, with the advent of gasoline engines, and the building of canals and locks to make rivers more navigable, many Ontario companies began producing wooden power boats. These were built from wide planks and shaped for speedy travel. In 1920, the Gidley Boat Works on Georgian Bay was taken over by Arthur Grew, who enlarged the company, renaming it Grew Manufacturing.

The Muskoka region was particularly known for its wooden speedboats. Early builders of these boats were Johnson of Port Carling and Ditchburn Boats; other companies were Minett-Shields, Greavette and Duke. The boats were often used for pleasure trips, fishing, and water sports, as well as transportation on Ontario's many lakes, rivers and canals. Today these boats are restored by hobbyists and valued as collector's items.

=== Fibreglass ===
In the 1950s fibreglass began to be used in boat construction, first as a waterproof covering for wooden boats, and later formed into complete boat hulls. By the 1960s there were a number of companies making fibreglass sailboats near the shores of Lake Ontario, including Oakville's Grampian Marine, and Hinterhoeller Yachts and C & C Yachts in Niagara-on-the-Lake. A company called Peterborough Boats, later bought by Princecraft, built fibreglass boats in Peterborough. Another company, Rossiter Boats, set up in Markdale in 1974, and Grew Manufacturing switched much of its output to fibreglass boats.

=== Aluminum ===
In 1974 Temagami Boat Manufacturing of Vermillion Bay bought the rights to build a line of aluminum fishing boats, Naden Boats, which had previously been made in the United States, and set up a factory. In 1986, the Duhamel and Dewar families in Sudbury began to manufacture under the name Legend Boats, choosing aluminum for its durability in the rugged terrain of the area; They later began to manufacture aluminum pontoon boats. In 1988, Connor Industries began manufacture of aluminum boats in Parry Sound under the Stanley brand. The company both imports and assembles parts, and builds special purpose boats for government and industry.

== Present day industry ==
Over time, the construction of modern roads and railways meant that small boats were mainly used for recreation, although in more remote areas they are still needed for transportation. In the late 2000s, a serious economic recession in North America left consumers with little money to spend on recreation. At the same time, the exchange rate between the Canadian and American dollar soared, making it expensive to buy raw materials and imported parts for boats. Many large longstanding companies went out of business, including Grew Manufacturing and Naden Boats, while some smaller companies, including Rossiter, Stanley and Legend, survived. With little sales activity, many companies turned their attention to updating their manufacturing processes and model designs, leading to a flurry of new offerings once the economic recovery began.

In 2018, after the United States imposed stiff tariffs on imports of steel and aluminum, Canada retaliated by placing a 10% tariff on the import of watercraft from the United States. This had a negative effect on companies which, like Legend, import American boats and boat parts.
