= This Is Stompin' Tom =

- Directed by: Edwin W. Moody
- Produced by: Edwin W. Moody
- Starring: Stompin' Tom Connors
- Cinematography: Charles Carignan, Steve Franklin
- Edited by: Ed Moody, Kevin Townshend
- Music by: Stompin' Tom Connors
- Release date: 1972 (Canada)
- Running time: 20 minutes
- Country: Canada
- Language: English
- Budget: CAD

This Is Stompin' Tom

This Is Stompin' Tom is a 20-minute 1972 Canadian documentary about Stompin' Tom Connors directed by Edwin W. Moody.

== Plot ==
Stompin' Tom Connors is shown from the Horseshoe Tavern in Toronto, then in a small interview, possibly from his home. Connors is also shown accepting his Gold Record award for his Bud The Spud album, which exceeded $100,000 in sales from Canadian Music Sales. Connors discusses where Canadian music is heading, and songs about Canada and where they lack. He talks about his hard life. Autograph signing takes place after a concert, possibly from the Perth Summer Festival.

== Production ==
Filmed by Marlin Motion Pictures, with credit to York University, Perth Summer Festival, and Horseshoe Tavern.

== Music ==
Some live video footage from the Horseshoe Tavern, however this footage is different from the 1973 film Across This Land with Stompin' Tom Connors. Live clips from Connors performing the songs "I've been Everywhere," "Bud the Spud," "Sudbury Saturday Night," "Mule Skinners Blues" and "My Stompin' Grounds" are included.
