= Stompin' Tom Connors =

Canadian singer-songwriter (1936–2013)

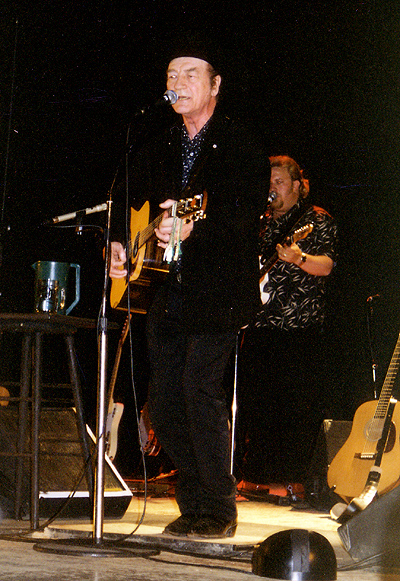
- Connors in 2002

Background information
- Also known as: Tommy Messer, Stompin' Tom Connors
- Born: Charles Thomas Connors; February 9, 1936; Saint John, New Brunswick, Canada
- Died: March 6, 2013 (aged 77) Ballinafad, Ontario, Canada
- Genres: Canadiana; folk; country
- Occupations: Musician; songwriter
- Instruments: Vocals; guitar
- Years active: 1964–1978; 1988–2013
- Labels: EMI; Boot; Rebel; Dominion; Cynda; ACT
- Website: www.stompintom.com

Charles Thomas "Stompin' Tom" Connors, OC (February 9, 1936 – March 6, 2013) was a Canadian country and folk singer-songwriter. Focusing his career exclusively on his native Canada, he is credited with writing more than 300 songs and has released four dozen albums, with total sales of nearly four million copies.

Connors' songs have become part of the Canadian cultural landscape. Among his best-known songs are "Sudbury Saturday Night", "Bud the Spud" and "The Hockey Song"; the last is played at various games throughout the National Hockey League, including at every Toronto Maple Leafs home game. In 2018, the song was inducted into the Canadian Songwriters Hall of Fame in a ceremony at a Leafs game.

== Early life ==
Charles Thomas Connors was born on February 9, 1936, at the General Hospital in Saint John, New Brunswick, to Isabel Connors and Thomas Joseph Sullivan.

His mother was born in Pubnico, Nova Scotia His maternal grandmother, Lucy Allen, was from Belleville, Nova Scotia, and his maternal grandfather, John Connors, was a sea captain from Boston, Massachusetts, who had died before Charles was born. His father was a Catholic of Irish ancestry, and "may have been Métis or ... Micmac." Isabel Connors and Thomas Joseph Sullivan did not marry until 30 years later, as Sullivan's family were devout Catholics and did not want him marrying a Protestant; they later divorced. Sullivan's mother gave him $10, and he was told to leave home. Connors was also a cousin of New Brunswick fiddling sensation, Ned Landry.

Connors' first home was on St. Patrick Street, in the "poorest and most rundown part of Saint John". He lived there with his mother, his maternal grandmother Lucy Scribner, and his maternal stepgrandfather Joe Scribner When Connors was three, Lucy and Joe died within weeks of each other. This forced Isabel to move to a two-bedroom apartment. Around this time Isabel got pregnant again by Tom's father when he briefly returned, and Tom got a taste of hitchhiking when he and Isabel went to visit relatives in Tusket Falls, Nova Scotia. This trip was the first time he saw his mother steal to feed them, when she stole food from a Chinese restaurant in Yarmouth, Nova Scotia. When they returned to Saint John, they moved in with friends of Isabel and she gave birth to Tom's sister Marie, who had to stay in hospital to have a birthmark removed. Later, Isabel and Tom moved in with her new boyfriend Terrence Messer at the corner of Clarence and Erin Streets. While they did not marry, the family would take on his surname. Terrence and Isabel did pretend to be married to find a place to live, due to the moral standards of the time. The family was quite poor, and Terrence was a neglectful stepfather, who spent most of the family's money on wine. When they missed paying rent, the family was evicted and moved to a house on St. Patrick Street. Marie finally came home from the hospital then, but she died when Tom was four, following more surgery to remove another birthmark. To make ends meet, Isabel got a job scrubbing floors and Terrence did odd jobs. The family was evicted again after a spat with the landlord when Tom started a fire in their apartment. Their next home was a basement apartment on King Street.

Connors spent a short time living with his mother in a low-security women's penitentiary before he was seized by Children's Aid Society and later adopted by Cora and Russell Aylward in Skinners Pond, Prince Edward Island.

At 13 he ran away from his adoptive family to hitchhike across Canada. He got his first guitar at 14, and at 15 he wrote his first song called "Reversing Falls Darling". His hitchhiking journey consumed the next 13 years of his life as he travelled among various part-time jobs while writing songs on his guitar, singing for his supper. He worked in mines and rode in boxcars, and in the coldest part of winter he welcomed vagrancy arrests for the warm place to sleep. At his last stop in Timmins, Ontario, he found himself a nickel short of a 35-cent beer at the city's Maple Leaf Hotel. Connors told the bartender to put the cap back on the bottle and he'd head for the Sally Ann, but the bartender, Gaëtan Lepine, accepted the 30 cents and offered him a second beer if he would open his guitar case and play a few songs. These few songs turned into a 14-month run at the hotel, a weekly spot on CKGB in Timmins, eight 45-RPM recordings, and the end of the beginning for Tom Connors.

== Musical career ==
Connors was never part of the Canadian musical establishment, and his style was quite different from other Canadian icons such as Leonard Cohen or Gordon Lightfoot. He could, however, be characterized as a passionist poet within Canadian culture, similar to Milton Acorn and Stan Rogers. As the National Post characterized him:

He sang of a nation without politics, to its proud history, and to its better angels. His songs remind us that Canada matters—that we've built something amazing here, and must not take it for granted.

Typically writing about Canadian lore and history, some of Connors' better-known songs include "Bud the Spud", "Big Joe Mufferaw", "The Black Donnellys", "The Martin Hartwell Story", "Reesor Crossing Tragedy", "Sudbury Saturday Night", and "The Hockey Song". This last, often incorrectly called "The Good Old Hockey Game," is frequently played over sound systems at National Hockey League (NHL) games.

Throughout the years, Connors never lost touch with Gaëtan Lepine, the bartender he befriended in Timmins; in fact, the two wrote many songs together. These songs are featured in 250 Songs by Stompin' Tom: Including All the Words and Chords.

In 1968, he composed and sang a radio jingle for a Sudbury-area tire store, Duhamel & Dewar, in exchange for a set of winter tires:

"When your tires are old and worn

and you think they should look newer,

drive on down to the Tire Town

and see Duhamel and Dewar."

During the mid-1970s Connors wrote and recorded The Consumer, an ode to bill-paying that became the theme song for the popular Canadian Broadcasting Corporation (CBC) consumer affairs program Marketplace. For the first few seasons, Connors appeared in the program's opening credits, before "The Consumer" was replaced as the theme—initially by an instrumental background version and ultimately by a different piece of music.

In 1974 Connors had a series running on CBC Television in which he met and exchanged with folks from all across Canada. Stompin' Tom's Canada was co-produced with the CBC, and consisted of 26 half-hour episodes.

The song that Connors wrote in the least time was "Maritime Waltz", which was completed in 12 minutes.

His character was rough but genuine. As the National Post noted:

[T]hat persona wasn't shtick. Stompin' Tom was one of the great Canadian story-tellers, and a uniquely collegial one as well. The proper venue for a Gordon Lightfoot performance is a concert hall, where the audience connects silently and contemplatively. The proper venue for Mr. Connors was a smoky bar room where people connected by slamming their beer mugs together, hopefully obliterating whatever differences existed between them.

In 1999, after completing a 38-city tour, Connors received the National Achievement Award at the annual SOCAN Awards held in Toronto.

In 2009, Connors was the recipient of the prestigious Lifetime Achievement Award at the annual SOCAN Awards in Toronto.

=== Nickname ===
Connors' habit of stomping the heel of his left boot to keep rhythm earned him the nickname "that stompin' guy", or "Stomper". It wasn't until Canada's 100th birthday, July 1, 1967, that the name "Stompin" Tom Connors was first used, when Boyd MacDonald, a waiter at the King George Tavern in Peterborough, Ontario, introduced Connors on stage. Based on an enthused audience reaction to it, Connors had it officially registered in Ontario as Stompin' Tom Ltd. the following week. Various stories have circulated about the origin of the foot stomping, but it's generally accepted that he did this to keep a strong tempo for his guitar playing—especially in the noisy bars and beer joints where he frequently performed. After numerous complaints about damaged stage floors, Connors began to carry a piece of plywood that he stomped even more vigorously than before. The "stompin'" board became one of his trademarks. After stomping a hole in the wood, he would pick it up and show it to the audience (accompanied by a joke about the quality of the local lumber) before calling for a new one. It was reported that when asked about his "stompin' board", Connors replied, "it's just a stage I'm going through". Connors periodically auctioned off his "stompin' boards" for charity, with one board selling for $15,000 in July 2011.

=== Favourite guitar ===
Connors's favourite guitar was a Gibson Southern Jumbo acoustic that he purchased in 1956 while on his way through Ohio to Nashville, Tennessee, and Mexico. He discovered it in a furniture store, hidden in a case on top of a shelf and, after some haggling, purchased it for $80 (he had $90 with him). The guitar was used to audition in 1964 at the Maple Leaf Hotel in Timmins, as well as for writing Bud the Spud four years later. Although retired in 1972, it remained in his possession. It has subsequently been refurbished, a birthday gift from his wife Lena. The serial number inside the guitar reads 2222 in red stamped numbers and the actual age of the guitar is still unknown.

=== Releases ===
Connors released music on seven different labels. His earliest foray into recording was on the CKGB Timmins radio station label. These 45 RPM singles were pressed by Quality Records in Toronto, and distributed (and paid for) primarily by Tom. His first two albums (and two subsequent 45 RPM singles) were released on the Rebel Records bluegrass label, under the name "Tom Connors". These two albums were subsequently re-released on Dominion Records under the Stompin' Tom moniker and had to be totally re-recorded due to a dispute with Rebel Records owner John Irvine.

Most of Connors's well-known albums were released on Dominion Records (1969–70), and after 1971 on the Boot Records label that he co-founded with Jury Krytiuk and Mark Altman. His releases on Dominion (and all subsequent releases) were done under the name "Stompin' Tom Connors". Most of the Rebel and Dominion albums would be reissued (and in some cases, re-recorded) under the Boot label, and would represent the bulk of his recorded material. It was released on 33 1/3 RPM record albums, 45 RPM record singles, 8-tracks, and cassette tapes.

After his retreat from the music business in the late 1970s, he started the A-C-T (Assisting Canadian Talent) label in 1986, and released two albums: Stompin' Tom is Back to Assist Canadian Talent and his comeback album, Fiddle and Songs in 1988. A-C-T also re-released Connors's back catalogue on cassette tapes only.

All of his subsequent releases (and re-releases) have been through Capitol Records / EMI. Most of this work is now available on Compact Disc. In recent years, many of his album releases have included at least one re-recording of one of his earlier songs.

=== Promoting Canadian artists ===
Connors founded three record labels, which promoted not just his own work, but that of other Canadian artists:

- Boot Records, together with its budget label Cynda, which were active in the 1970s and 1980s
- A-C-T, active from the late 1980s

Among artists who were featured on these labels were Liona Boyd, Rita MacNeil, The Canadian Brass, Dixie Flyers, Charlie Panigoniak, among others. Liona Boyd recalled in 2013 about the time Connors signed Boyd to Boot for her first record, 1974's The Guitar, and two more:

It was Tom's vision obviously. And as I understood it, he wasn't really a fan of classical music but he had heard Canada had no classical label, which was absolutely true. So bless him, he went and decided he'd be the first one. And he signed myself and the Canadian Brass. It's like me deciding, "Well listen, maybe I don't know much about rap, but hey Canada's doesn't have a rap label, I'll go and do it." So he was a bit of a pioneer with classical music.

=== Cultural and historical references ===
In the book Shake Hands with the Devil: The Failure of Humanity in Rwanda, Romeo Dallaire, the Canadian general who led the UNAMIR peacekeeping force in Rwanda during that country's 1994 genocide reported that he played a recording of Connors's song "The Blue Berets" (about United Nations peacekeeping forces) to keep up his troops' morale while their headquarters was under bombardment.

The Les Claypool Frog Brigade mentions Connors in the song "Long in the Tooth" on the album Purple Onion, while Corb Lund references him in the song "Long Gone to Saskatchewan" and Dean Brody references him in the song "Canadian Girls".

Tim Hus also wrote a song titled "Man with the Black Hat" about Connors and Al Tuck wrote and recorded a song called "Stompin' Tom Connors Dot Com".

=== Songs referencing Canadian historical events ===
The following is a list of events in the history of Canada which have been the subject of a song by Connors, who is widely renowned for singing about both well-known and little-known episodes in the country's past.

Song	Summary
"Reesor Crossing Tragedy"	1969 song about the Reesor Siding Strike of 1963 which saw three union workers murdered.
"Tillsonburg"	When Stompin' Tom worked in the tobacco fields of Tillsonburg, Ontario.
"Wop May"	About the Canadian pilot Wilfrid R. "Wop" May.
"The Bridge Came Tumblin' Down"	1972 song about the 19 men killed in the collapse of the Ironworkers Memorial Second Narrows Crossing.
"The Curse of the Marc Guylaine"	1973 song about the fishing trawler Marc Guylaine which saw two sister-ships and two identical ships all sink under inexplicable circumstances.
"Big Joe Mufferaw"	About the French-Canadian logging legend Joseph Montferrand.
"The Martin Hartwell Story"	About the bush pilot Martin Hartwell who survived 31 days in the Northwest Territories, after resorting to cannibalism (Connors' song does not reference this last fact, instead focusing on the efforts of David Pisurayak Kootook in helping keep Hartwell alive at the cost of his own life).
"Algoma Central 69"	About the historical Algoma Central Railway.
"The Black Donnellys' Massacre" and "Jenny Donnelly"	Both about the Black Donnellys
"The Last Fatal Duel"	1973 song about Robert Lyon.
"Fire in the Mine"	About the Hollinger Mines fire that killed 39 miners in Timmins, Ontario.

== Personal life ==
Connors married Lena Welsh on November 2, 1973. The ceremony was broadcast live on Elwood Glover's Luncheon Date on CBC Television. During an interview on the show, he said they had chosen to get married on television to share this happy moment with his fans across the country whose support had rescued him from a difficult pre-showbusiness life. Connors had two sons, Taw and Tom Jr.

Connors was a heavy smoker—estimated to consume 100 cigarettes a day—and an equally heavy drinker. On tour, he had to drive the lead truck, and could never be the last person to go to bed, and that often meant that his fellow musicians had to keep up with his pace.

Connors always wore his black Stetson in public, and refused to remove it for any reason, even when meeting Queen Elizabeth II at a dinner in Ottawa in October 2002. Buckingham Palace smoothed the way by likening Mr. Connors's hat to a religious headdress such as a nun's habit or a Sikh's turban. However, Connors did go hatless during his nationally-televised wedding on CBC-TV to Lena Welsh.

=== Retirement and nationalist protest ===
As the 1970s progressed, he retired to his farm at Ballinafad, near Erin, Ontario, to protest the lack of support given to Canadian stories by the policies of the Federal government, particularly the Canadian Radio-television and Telecommunications Commission (CRTC). He also boycotted the Juno Awards in protest of the qualification guidelines set by the Canadian Academy of Recording Arts and Sciences (CARAS) for possible nominees who were being consistently nominated and awarded outside of their musical genre. He strongly opposed artists who conducted most of their business in the United States being nominated for Junos in Canada. Connors, who referred to these particular artists as "turncoat Canadians", felt that, since they had chosen to live and work in the U.S., it was only fair that they competed with Americans for Grammy Awards, and left the Juno competition to those who lived and conducted business in Canada.

His protest caught national attention when he sent back his six Junos accompanied by a letter to the board of directors.

Gentlemen:

I am returning herewith the six Juno awards that I once felt honoured to have received and which, I am no longer proud to have in my possession. As far as I am concerned you can give them to the border jumpers who didn't receive an award this year and maybe you can have them presented by Charley Pride. I feel that the Junos should be for people who are living in Canada, whose main base of business operations is in Canada, who are working toward the recognition of Canadian talent in this country and who are trying to further the export of such talent from this country to the world with a view to proudly showing off what this country can contribute to the world market.

Until the academy appears to comply more closely with aspirations of this kind, I will no longer stand for any nominations, nor will I accept any award given.

Yours very truly, Stompin' Tom Connors

He remained in retirement for 12 years, only returning to the studio in 1986 to produce a new album to promote Canadian artists. That year, Tim Vesely and Dave Bidini of Rheostatics crashed his 50th birthday party and published an article about it in a Toronto newspaper, initiating a resurgence of public and record label interest in his work which resulted in the release in 1988 of Fiddle and Song, his first new album since 1977.

=== Guest of honour on Late Night ===
Connors' music is rarely heard outside Canada, with the possible exception of his anthemic "The Hockey Song" which has been recorded by many artists and played regularly within the arenas of the National Hockey League. It has been suggested that Connors refused to allow foreign release of his material, although a more likely reason is that the very Canadian-specific subject matter of many of his folk songs has resulted in limited demand in foreign markets. When Late Night with Conan O'Brien taped a week's worth of shows in Canada in 2004, Connors was one of the guests of honour, leading the Toronto audience in a rendition of "The Hockey Song"; this was one of the few times Connors performed on American television. Another Canadian-taped installment of Late Night featured a segment in which Triumph the Insult Comic Dog visited Quebec; a parody of Connors' "Canada Day, Up Canada Way" is heard during the segment.

=== Dispute with the Canadian Broadcasting Corporation ===
According to Connors' promoter, Brian Edwards, the CBC had expressed interest for Connors to do a music special since 1990. Connors shot and edited a live concert presentation at Hamilton Place at a cost of over $200,000 of his own money in September 2005. Edwards said that a copy was presented to the CBC's head of TV variety and that he received a reply the next day telling him that a decision would be reached within a few weeks. After 10 weeks, another email was then sent to the newly appointed programming VP, and a prompt reply came back that said that the broadcaster was moving away from music and variety programming and that the Connors special did not fit with its strategy.

Edwards said that he received another letter from the CBC that reinforced its lack of interest in the concert special but said that Connors would have been a great guest to perform a song on the network's Hockeyville series or an excellent subject for a Life and Times project. In response, Connors said:

As far as I'm concerned, if the CBC, our own public network, will not reconsider their refusal to air a Stompin' Tom special, they can take their wonderful offer of letting me sing a song as a guest on some other program and shove it.

Ultimately, the film was released on DVD as Stompin' Tom In Concert by EMI in 2006. The soundtrack was released posthumously on CD at the same time as a DVD & Blue Ray re-issue by Universal Music Canada in 2014.

=== Autobiography ===
Stompin' Tom: Before the Fame is an autobiography detailing Connors' childhood years in an orphanage, and as a farm labourer. It was a runner-up for the Edna Staebler Award for Creative Non-Fiction in 1996 and became a bestseller in 1997. It details his life before becoming famous. In 2000 Connors wrote his second autobiography The Connors Tone.

=== Death and memorial service ===
Connors died of kidney failure on March 6, 2013, at his home in Ballinafad, at age 77. He refused to seek medical treatment, as he was skeptical of the benefits of medical technology. On March 7, flags were lowered to half-mast at the National Arts Centre in Ottawa, and also in Tillsonburg, to mark his death. On March 9, that following Saturday night, Hockey Night in Canada broadcast a special tribute to Connors at the opening of its broadcast.

Immediately after his death, The Globe and Mail noted:

These days, Canada isn't scared to be a little loud and proud. Politicians push patriotic buttons and endlessly recite their devotion to "hard-working Canadians." Advertisers shamelessly (and successfully) plug our country and its natural beauty, and play up Canadians' adventuresome and ribald sides. But Stompin' Tom was doing that a long time ago, celebrating the end of a hard week's work with famous lyrics like,

The girls are out to bingo and the boys are getting' stinko
And we'll think no more of Inco on a Sudbury Saturday night.

In a 1995 interview, Mr. Connors offered the opinion that nobody should die happy:

I think people should die without their dreams being fulfilled, so maybe they can have an excuse for coming around again.

On March 7, several members of the federal New Democratic Party caucus, led by former musicians Charlie Angus and Andrew Cash, performed a group rendition of Connors' signature song "Bud the Spud" in the foyer of the House of Commons of Canada in tribute.

In addition to reports and obituaries published in the Canadian media, his death was also reported by The New York Times, BBC News and the Xinhua News Agency.

A memorial was held on March 13, 2013, at the Peterborough Memorial Centre in Peterborough, Ontario. Tommy Hunter attended, and the celebration included speeches by former governor general Adrienne Clarkson and Ken Dryden. Testimonials were given or read from others, including Roméo Dallaire, Rita MacNeil and Liona Boyd. Before his death, Connors had personally selected the artists who would perform:

Tribute	Artists
Peterborough Postman, The Blue Berets, The Ballad of Stompin' Tom and The Hockey Song (videos)	Stompin' Tom Connors
Fiddle medley of traditional music (The Maritime Waltz)	Billy Macinnis
Man in the Black Hat	Tim Hus
Little Wawa and Gumboot Cloggeroo (medley)	J.P. Cormier and Dave Gunning
Farewell to Nova Scotia	Sylvia Tyson and Cindy Church
The Bridge Came Tumbling Down	Dave Bidini
Coal Boat Song	Damhnait Doyle
So Long Stompin' Tom	Mike Plume
I am the Wind	Mark Laforme

At the end of the service, before Sudbury Saturday Night was played, Tom Connors, Jr., spoke about his father, and looked to the future:

I heard some people comment at the funeral, saying there'll never be another Stompin' Tom. Well, I got news for you. We still have a Canada, and we still have the roads, towns, people, jobs – and that's what Tom wrote about. So never say never.... He never liked anyone copying him, but anyone who wants to sing about Canada, keep 'er on going.

It's nice to travel south. It might be warmer on the skin, but if you go east and west, it'll be warmer on your hearts.

He was subsequently buried at Erin Union Cemetery in Erin, Ontario. The headstone contains these words:

The body has returned to sod,
The spirit has returned to God.
So on this spot, no need for grief,
Here only lies a fallen leaf.
Until new blossoms form in time,
The tree is where I now reside.
But with this poem, as you can see,
They haven't heard the last of me.

Connors was also the subject of a video tribute at the 2013 East Coast Music Awards on March 10.

== Honours ==
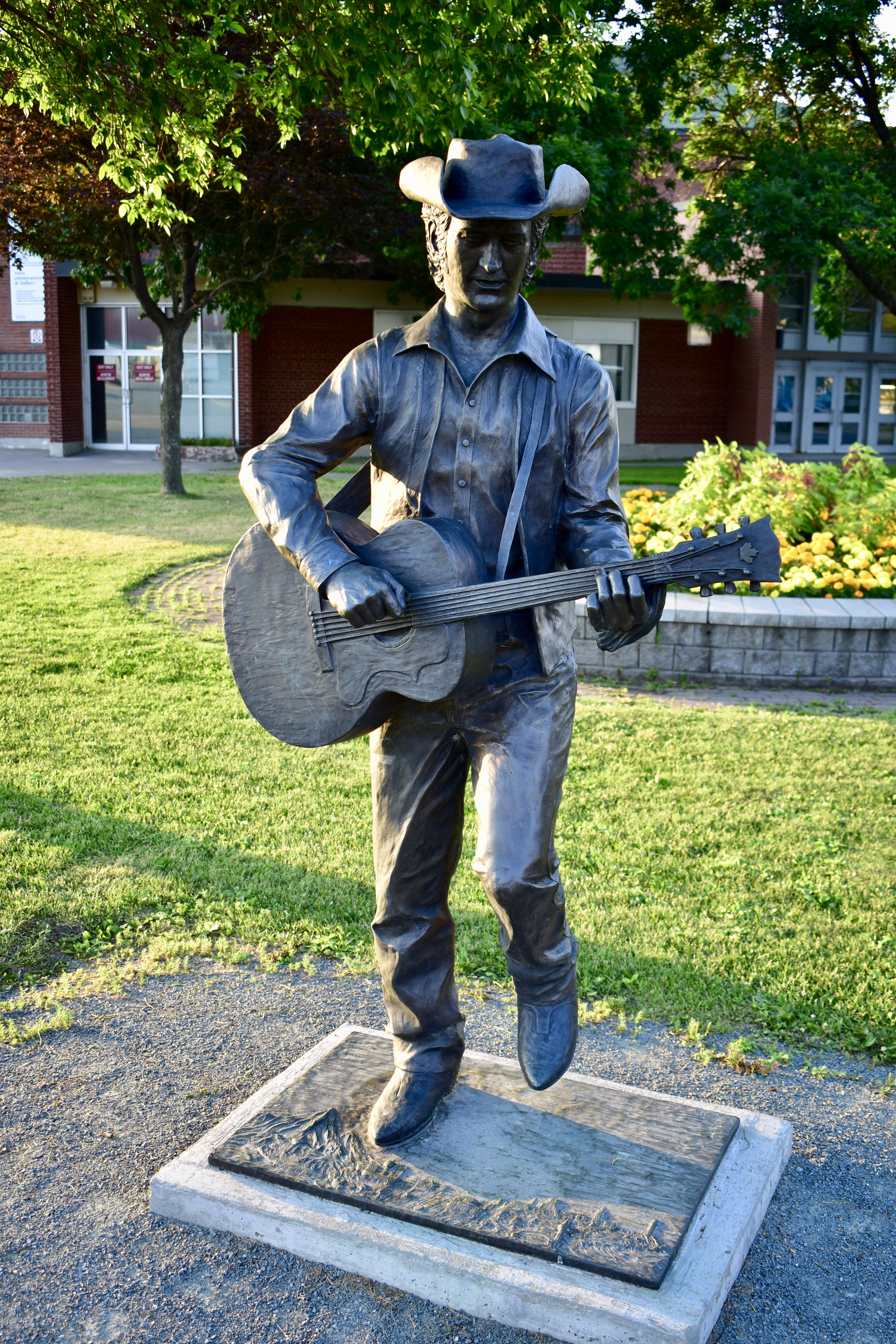
The 2015 bronze statue of Stompin' Tom, with Connors' left hand positioned for chord of C−, one of the major chords in the song "Sudbury Saturday Night".

The following honours were conferred on him:

- From the Juno Awards, Country Male Vocalist of the Year (1971–1975) and Country Album of the Year (1974, for To It And at It)—all subsequently returned in 1978. He left instructions that the Junos were not to celebrate him after his death.
- In 1993, a Doctor of Laws degree honoris causa from St. Thomas University, which was the inspiration for his album titled Dr. Stompin' Tom Connors, eh?, released the same year.
- In 1996, Officer of the Order of Canada.
- In 2000, a Lifetime Artistic Achievement award for Popular Music from the Governor General's Performing Arts Awards.
- In 2000, an honorary LL.D. from the University of Toronto.
- In 2002, an honorary Litt.D. from the University of Prince Edward Island.
- In 2009, a SOCAN award for Lifetime Achievement.
- In 2014, it was announced that a commemorative statue would be located in downtown Sudbury, ON.

In 1993, he declined to be inducted into the Canadian Country Music Hall of Fame.

In The Greatest Canadian list, he ranked thirteenth, the highest placing for any artist on the list. Connors was one of four musicians pictured on the second series of the Canadian Recording Artist Series issued by Canada Post stamps on July 2, 2009.

== Discography ==
=== Albums ===
From 1991, Connors recorded his albums at Escarpment Sound Studio in Acton, Ontario.

Year	Album	Chart Positions		CRIA
Year	Album	CAN Country	CAN	CRIA
1967	The Northlands' Own Tom Connors^{A}	—	—	—
1968	On Tragedy Trail With Tom Connors	—	—	—
1969	Bud the Spud and Other Favourites	—	—	Gold
1970	Stompin' Tom Meets Big Joe Mufferaw	—	—	—
1970	Merry Christmas Everybody	—	—	—
1970	Stompin' Tom Connors Sings 60 Old Time Favourites^{A}	—	—	
1971	Stompin' Tom Sings 60 More Old Time Favourites^{B}	—	—	
1971	Live at the Horseshoe	—	—	—
1971	My Stompin' Grounds	—	71	—
1971	Love & Laughter^{B}	—	—	—
1972	Stompin' Tom and the Hockey Song	—	—	—
1973	To It and at It	—	—	—
1973	Northlands Zone	—	—	—
1974	Stompin' Tom Meets Muk Tuk Annie	—	—	—
1975	The North Atlantic Squadron	—	—	—
1976	The Unpopular Stompin' Tom Connors	—	—	—
1977	Stompin' Tom at the Gumboot Cloggeroo	—	—	—
1986	Stompin' Tom Is Back to Assist Canadian Talent^{C}	—	—	—
1988	Fiddle and Song	—	—	—
1991	More of the Stompin' Tom Phenomenon	—	—	—
1992	Believe in Your Country	9	—	—
1993	Dr. Stompin' Tom Eh?	28	—	—
1995	Long Gone to the Yukon	5	—	—
1999	Move Along with Stompin' Tom	—	—	—
2000	The Confederation Bridge^{D}	—	—	—
2002	An Ode for the Road	—	—	—
2004	Stompin' Tom and the Hockey Mom Tribute	—	—	—
2008	The Ballad of Stompin Tom	—	—	—
2012	Stompin' Tom and the Road's Of Life	—	—	—
2014	Unreleased Songs From The Vault Collection-Vol. 1	—	—	—
2014	Live Concert Soundtrack	—	—	—
2017	Stompin' Tom Connors	—	—	—
2018	Unreleased Songs From The Vault Collection (Vol. 3)	—	—	—
2021	Unreleased Songs From The Vault Collection Volume. 4: Let's Smile Again	—	—	—

Notes

- ^{A}Re-released on A-C-T Records in the mid-1980s as "Northland Zone" due to a printing error
- ^{B}Later released as "Stompin' Tom and the Moon-Man Newfie" in 1973
- ^{C}Contains four Stompin' Tom songs plus an intro and final message to support Canadian talent. Otherwise, this is an album which also features other Canadian country musicians: Wayne Chapman, Cliff Evans, Donna Lambert, Bruce Caves, Art Hawes, Kent Brockwell
- ^{D}A five-song EP containing The Confederation Bridge, My Home Cradled Out In The Waves, Bud the Spud, Skinner's Pond Teapot, J.R.'s Bar – basically PEI songs.

=== Compilations ===
Year	Album	CAN Country	CRIA
1971	The Best of Stompin' Tom Connors	—	—
1972	Pistol Packin' Mama	—	—
1972	Bringing Them Back	—	—
1973	Across This Land^{C}	—	—
1980	Souvenirs	—	—
1990	A Proud Canadian	—	Platinum
1991	Once Upon a Stompin' Tom	—	—
1993	K.I.C. Along with Stompin' Tom	26	—
1998	25 of the Best Stompin' Tom Souvenirs	12	Platinum
2001	Sings Canadian History	—	—
2006	Live Concert (DVD)	—	2× Platinum
2014	Unreleased Songs from the Vault^{D}	—	—

Notes

- ^{A}This is a Five Record box set that has never been re-released
- ^{B}This is another Five Record box set that has never been re-released
- ^{C}Original Soundtrack recording (at the Horseshoe Tavern) for "Across This Land with Stompin' Tom". Also features Bobby Lalonde, Joey Tardif, Chris Scott, Kent Brockwell, Sharon Lowness and The Rovin' Cowboys plus a separately recorded "Tribute To Stompin' Tom" by Fred Dixon. This 'double-album' has never been re-released.
- ^{D}First of four volumes (to date) compiling demos, unreleased studio recordings and (despite the title of the series) previously released tracks. Vol. 2 (2015); Vol. 3 (2018); Vol. 4: Let's Smile Again (2021).

=== Singles ===
Year	Single	Chart Positions		Certifications	Album
Year	Single	CAN Country	CAN AC	Certifications	Album
1967	"Sudbury Saturday Night / Don Valley Jail"	-	-		The Northland's Own / On Tragedy Trail
1967	"The Hepworth Country Music Auditorium"	-	-		None
1969	"Bud the Spud"	26	—	MC: Gold	Bud the Spud and Other Favourites
1970	"Big Joe Mufferaw"	1	—		Stompin' Tom Meets Big Joe Mufferaw
1970	"Ketchup Song"	1	—		Bud the Spud and Other Favourites
1970	"Luke's Guitar"	2	—		Bud the Spud and Other Favourites
1971	"Snowmobile Song"	40	—		My Stompin' Grounds
1971	"The Bridge Came Tumbling Down"	2	—		My Stompin' Grounds
1971	"Tillsonburg"	12	—		My Stompin' Grounds
1971	"My Stompin' Grounds"	31	—		My Stompin' Grounds
1971	"Name the Capital"	34	—		My Stompin' Grounds
1972	"Moon-Man Newfie"	1	—		Love & Laughter
1972	"The Bug Song"	9	18		Love & Laughter
1972	"Fire in the Mine"	24	—		Love & Laughter
1973	"The Consumer"	59	—		Stompin' Tom and the Hockey Song
1973	"Martin Hartwell Story"	30	—		To It and at It
1973	"Poor Poor Farmer"	68	—		Stompin' Tom Meets Big Joe Mufferaw
1973	"Algoma Central No. 69"	67	—		Stompin' Tom Meets Big Joe Mufferaw
1973	"Don Messer Story"	40	—		To It and at It
1974	"To It and at It"	42	—		To It and at It
1974	"Streaker's Dream"	34	—		Stompin' Tom Meets Muk Tuk Annie
1975	"Jack of Many Trades"	24	—		The North Atlantic Squadron
1989	"Canada Day, Up Canada Way"	29	—		Fiddle and Song
1989	"I Am the Wind"	40	—		Fiddle and Song
1997	"The Confederation Bridge"	79	—		The Confederation Bridge

=== Other charted songs ===
Year	Song	Chart Positions	Certifications	Album
Year	Song	CAN	Certifications	Album
2013	"The Hockey Song"	29	MC: Platinum	Stompin' Tom and the Hockey Song

=== Music videos ===
Year	Video
1989	"I Am the Wind"
1991	"Margo's Cargo"

== Bibliography ==
- Connors, Stompin' Tom (1992). My Stompin' Grounds. illustrations by Kurt Swinghammer. Toronto: Doubleday Canada. p. 32. ISBN 0-38525406-7.
- Connors, Stompin' Tom (1994). Bud the Spud. illustrations by Brenda Jones. Charlottetown: Ragweed. p. 20. ISBN 0-92155643-8.
- Connors, Tom (1995). Stompin' Tom – Before the Fame. Toronto: Viking Penguin. p. 560. ISBN 0-670-86487-0.
- Connors, Tom (2000). Stompin' Tom and the Connors Tone. Toronto: Viking Penguin. p. 680. ISBN 0-670-86488-9.
- Connors, Stompin' Tom (2005). 250 Songs by Stompin' Tom: Including All the Words and Chords. Georgetown: Crown-Vetch Music. p. 183. ISBN 0-97381710-0.
- Connors, Stompin' Tom (2009). Hockey Night Tonight. illustrations by Brenda Jones. Halifax: Nimbus. p. 24. ISBN 978-1-55109733-6.

== Filmography ==
- This Is Stompin' Tom (1972)
- Across This Land with Stompin' Tom Connors (1973)
- Catch The Sun (1973) - Short film
- Stompin' Tom's Canada (1974–1975) – TV series
- Stompin' Tom in Live Concert (2006) TV Special / DVD Release

== Other creations ==
In 1976, Connors created and sold a perpetual calendar that cross-references dates to days of the week, which is valid for all years from 1 to 3100 AD. It was released to Harrowsmith's Truly Canadian Almanac in 2012.
