= Director of Officiating =

The Director of Officiating can refer to a position within several professional sports leagues:

- Director of Officiating (NHL), National Hockey League
- Director of Officiating (NFL); see List of National Football League officials
- Director of Officiating (NBA), National Basketball Association; see Ed T. Rush
