= Terry Gregson =

Canadian ice hockey official (born 1953)

- Born: November 7, 1953 (age 72); Erin, Ontario, Canada
- Occupation: NHL Director of Officiating

Terry Gregson (born November 7, 1953) is a retired NHL referee and official. Gregson served as the National Hockey League Director of Officiating from 2009 through 2013. He was formerly a referee in the NHL from 1979 until 2004. He wore a helmet from the mid-1980s until the end of his refereeing career. From the 1994–95 NHL season until his retirement, he wore uniform number 4, which is now worn by Wes McCauley. During his career, he refereed 1,427 regular season games, 158 playoff games, nine Stanley Cup Finals and one All-Star game. He also worked the 1996 World Cup of Hockey.

On March 23, 1994, Gregson refereed the game in which Wayne Gretzky became the NHL's all-time leading goal scorer.

Gregson was the referee when the New York Rangers won its first Stanley Cup in 54 years in 1994, which was the highlight of his officiating career.

Gregson was also the referee for the controversial game six of the 1999 Stanley Cup which was the "No Goal" game.

He was named NHL Director of Officiating on September 9, 2009. His retirement was announced August 7, 2013.

Preceded by Stephen Walkom	Director of Officiating; 2009 - 2013	Succeeded by Stephen Walkom
