= Element Yachts =

- Type: Private
- Industry: Boatbuilding
- Headquarters: Erin, Ontario
- Area served: Worldwide
- Products: Element line of Express Cruisers
- Parent: Element Corporation
- Subsidiaries: view all subsidiaries
- Website: www.elementyachts.com

Element Yachts is a second generation Canadian boatbuilding company located in Erin, Ontario. The company offers the Element line of express cruiser boats. The first model of the series was the 27-foot (8.2 m) Element 270 EXC, which began production in 2005. Element Yachts focuses primarily on the powerboat sector of the boating market, and sells its products worldwide.

== Group structure ==
Element Yachts is a subsidiary of the Element Corporation which consists of:

- Element Yachts (Express cruiser powerboats)
- Element Composites (Composite structures for commercial and military use)
- Element Power Center (Engine replacement services with modern, fuel efficient engines)

Element Yachts and the other Element Corporation subsidiaries operate from a 20,000-square-foot (1,900 m^{2}) facility on 4 acres (16,000 m^{2}) in Erin. This facility has the capacity to produce composite boats and structures up to 75 ft (23 m) x 15 ft (4.6 m) x 15 ft (4.6 m) in size.

== History ==
Element Yachts began life as the P.C. Mould Company. P.C. Mould produced the Dragonfly sailboat under license and re-formed in their present location as Contour Yachts.

Contour Yachts produced the Contour line of sailing trimarans throughout the 1980s and 1990s. These three-hulled sailing craft offer excellent stability and speed compared to mono hull or catamarans. Contour Yachts produced boats in sizes from 30 feet (9.1 m) to over 50 feet (15 m) in length. The construction and build quality of the Contour boats were a key feature in magazine reviews. Contour is a historical name and fixture in the Canadian yachting and boating industry. Their efforts helped develop the trimaran as a serious sailing vessel, which are now recognized as stable and high-speed platform for lake and ocean sailing.

When the founder retired, the rights to the Contour sailboat line was sold off and the second generation took over and reformed the company as Element Yachts. The founder and family have been active in Canada's boating and sailing industry for many years. They actively race on historic 8-metre keelboats and patented a method of sailboat mast manufacturing.

== See also ==
- Boat building industry in Ontario
