= Vermilion Bay =

Vermilion Bay may refer to:

- Vermilion Bay (Louisiana), a bay on the coast of Louisiana in the United States
- Vermilion Bay, Ontario, a community in Ontario, Canada
- Vermilion Bay Airport, an airport near Machin, Ontario, Canada
- Vermilion Bay Water Aerodrome, a water aerodrome near Vermilion Bay, Ontario, Canada
