= Big Joe Mufferaw (song) =

1970 single by Stompin' Tom Connors

Single by Stompin' Tom Connors

from the album Stompin' Tom Meets Big Joe Mufferaw
- Released: 2000, 1970
- Recorded: 1970, 1999
- Genre: Country
- Label: Dominion
- Songwriter: Tom Connors

Stompin' Tom Connors singles chronology
"Bud the Spud" (1969)	"Big Joe Mufferaw" (2000)	"Ketchup Song" (1970)

"Big Joe Mufferaw" is a single by Canadian country music artist Stompin' Tom Connors written about French Canadian folk hero Big Joe Mufferaw. It was re-recorded in 1999 for his Move Along With Stompin' Tom album.

== Content ==
The song describes the following tall tales, with many references to the Ottawa Valley:

- Joe "paddled in to Mattawa all the way from Ottawa in just one day".
- Joe had a "pet frog who was bigger than a horse, and barked like a dog."
- Mississippi Lake was formed as a result of sweat dripping off his face, as the citizens of Carleton Place can attest to.
- Joe portaged from Gatineau to Kemptville, to see his girlfriend, and "he was back and forth so many times to see that gal, the path he wore became the Rideau Canal."
- He "put out a forest fire halfway between Renfrew and old Arnprior. He was 50 miles away, down around Smiths Falls, when he drowned out the fire with five spitballs."
- He "jumped in the Calabogie Lake real fast and swam both ways to catch a cross eyed bass, but he threw it to the ground and said "I can't eat that," so he covered it up with Mount St. Pat."
- After drinking a bucket of gin, Joe "beat the living tar out of 29 men and high above the ceiling of the Pembroke pub, there's 29 boot marks, and they're signed 'with love.'" This is a reference to the Pembroke Hotel, a favourite of Stompin' Tom's.

== Chart performance ==
"Big Joe Mufferaw" debuted at number 43 on the RPM Country Singles chart on 14 March 1970. It peaked at number 1 on 23 May 1970. The song was number 9 on the RPM Magazine Top 100 CanCon Country tracks compiled for the 22 June 1998, issue. A cover by Dave Carlisle reached number 68 in Canada in 1973.

Chart (1970)	Peak position
Canadian RPM Country Tracks	1
