= Stompin' Tom's Canada =

- Written by: Colin McLean
- Presented by: Stompin' Tom Connors
- Country of origin: Canada
- Original language: English
- No. of seasons: 1
- No. of episodes: 26

Production
- Producer: Don McRae
- Production location: Edmonton
- Running time: 30 minutes

Original release
- Network: CBC Television
- Release: 26 September 1974 – 13 March 1975

Stompin' Tom's Canada is a Canadian music and documentary television series which aired on CBC Television from 1974 to 1975.

== Premise ==
This series featured Stompin' Tom Connors on tour throughout Canada with a mix of studio and location scenes. Connors' performances were combined with location segments featuring the various communities he visited. Regulars of this Edmonton-produced series included Gary Empey and Bill Lewis.

== Scheduling ==
This half-hour series was broadcast on Thursdays at 9:00 p.m. (Eastern) from 26 September 1974 to 13 March 1975.
