= Henry Alan Skinner =

Canadian writer

Henry Alan Lawson Skinner (September 26, 1899, in Erin, Ontario – ?) was a Canadian anatomist and classical scholar who wrote The Origin of Medical Terms, published by The Williams & Wilkins Company, Baltimore in 1949. He received his M.B from Toronto, and was appointed assistant professor of Anatomy at the University of Western Ontario in 1929. By 1963, he had risen to Professor and Head of the Department of Anatomy at Western Ontario.
