= CHES-FM =

Radio station in Erin, Ontario

Coordinates: 43°45′56″N 80°03′41″W

Erin, Ontario; Canada
- Frequency: 91.7 MHz
- Branding: Erin Radio 91.7

Programming
- Format: Community radio

Ownership
- Owner: Erin Community Radio; (Erin Radio Board of Directors)

History
- First air date: September 2006
- Former frequencies: 101.5 MHz (2006–2011); 88.1 MHz (2011–2016)

Technical information
- ERP: 850 watts (2,500 watts maximum)
- HAAT: 63 metres (207 ft)

Links
- Website: www.erinradio.org

CHES-FM (91.7 MHz) is a non-commercial community radio station in Erin, Ontario, branded as Erin Radio 91.7. It is staffed by volunteers and the license is held by the Erin Radio Board of Directors. Studios and offices are on Main Street in Erin village.

The station serves the town of Erin as well as neighboring communities. The station features regular news updates, and community events. Music formats include rock, pop, folk, roots, country, bluegrass, jazz, R&B, blues, and oldies. The station also focuses on the airplay of independent local, regional and national Canadian music, with the goal of promoting new talent in Canada.

== History ==
The concept of "Erin Radio" was given a kickstart after the hydro blackout in August 2003. The mayor and council arranged to have a local company provide free bottled water to Erin residents, but there was no way to get the word out. Phone systems were down, home radios and televisions were off and there was no emergency communications system in the town. If Erin Radio had been operating at the time with a diesel generator, emergency information could have been broadcast to those with car or transistor radios.

- On April 21, 2006, a local community group, Erin Community Radio, was granted approval by the CRTC to operate a new community radio station at 101.5 MHz in Erin. It launched in September 2006, and the official launch took place at the Erin Fall Fair on October 8, 2006.
- On January 29, 2010, CHES applied to change frequency from 101.5 to 88.1 MHz, receiving CRTC approval on June 16, 2010. On April 11, 2011, CHES began a test broadcast on 88.1 FM.
- On April 20, 2012, CHES rebranded from "Erin Radio" to "Main Street Radio FM 88". On November 29, 2012, CHES rebranded from "Main Street Radio" to "Mix 88.1". Their studio also moved from 106 Main Street to 8 Thompson Crescent in Erin.
- On November 1, 2013, the CRTC approved Erin Community Radio's application to increase the average ERP of CHES-FM from 125 to 570 watts (maximum ERP increasing from 250 to 1,250 watts).
- On December 11, 2013, Erin Community Radio submitted an application to operate a new FM transmitter at Orangeville, which would repeat the programming of CHES-FM as CHES-FM-1 at 89.1 MHz with 50 watts. This application was denied by the CRTC on October 30, 2014.
- Erin Radio Studios moved to Fergus in May 2014 but continued broadcasting to the Erin area. As of January 5, 2015, the station broadcasts from the United Church on the Main Street in Erin.
- On April 24, 2015, Erin Community Radio submitted an application to change CHES-FM's frequency from 88.1 MHz to 91.7 MHz. On May 18, 2016, the CRTC approved Erin Community Radio's application to move CHES-FM from 88.1 MHz (channel 201A) to 91.7 MHz (channel 219A) and increasing its average effective radiated power (ERP) from 570 to 850 watts (maximum ERP from 1,250 to 2,500 watts).
- On June 21, 2016, CHES-FM changed its frequency from 88.1 MHz to 91.7 MHz.
