= John McCauley (referee) =

Canadian ice hockey official (1945–1989)

- Born: October 4, 1944 Brampton, Ontario, Canada
- Died: June 2, 1989 (aged 44) Ontario, Canada
- Position: Referee/Goaltender
- Caught: Left
- Playing career: 1966–1981

John Wesley McCauley (October 4, 1944 – June 2, 1989) was a Canadian ice hockey referee who served in the National Hockey League (NHL) between 1966 and 1981.

== Early life ==
McCauley was raised in Brampton, where he developed a strong passion for sports at an early age, particularly excelling in both hockey and lacrosse. As a hockey player, he played the demanding position of goaltender, showcasing his quick reflexes and mental toughness on the ice. Simultaneously, he was an accomplished lacrosse player, known for his athleticism and competitive spirit. In 1959, his efforts were instrumental in helping the Brampton Excelsiors win the Canadian Junior Lacrosse Championship.

== Career ==
Throughout his career, McCauley officiated 442 regular-season games and 12 playoff contests. In 1979, he suffered a severe injury to his right eye after being attacked by a fan following a game between the NHL All-Stars and the Soviet Union. Although he eventually resumed officiating, the injury affected his depth perception, leading him to retire from refereeing two years later.

In June 1979, McCauley was appointed as the assistant director of officiating for the National Hockey League (NHL). Demonstrating strong leadership and a deep understanding of the game, he was promoted to director of officiating in 1986. He remained in this role until his untimely death in 1989.

== Personal life ==
McCauley died at the age of 44 due to complications following emergency gallbladder surgery. His son, Wes McCauley, was selected by the Detroit Red Wings in the eighth round of the 1990 NHL entry draft. Wes later pursued a career in officiating like his father and became an NHL referee, officiating his first NHL game in 2003 and becoming a full-time official in 2005.

Preceded by Wally Harris	Director of Officiating; 1986–1989	Succeeded by Bryan Lewis
