= Wes McCauley =

Canadian ice hockey player and referee

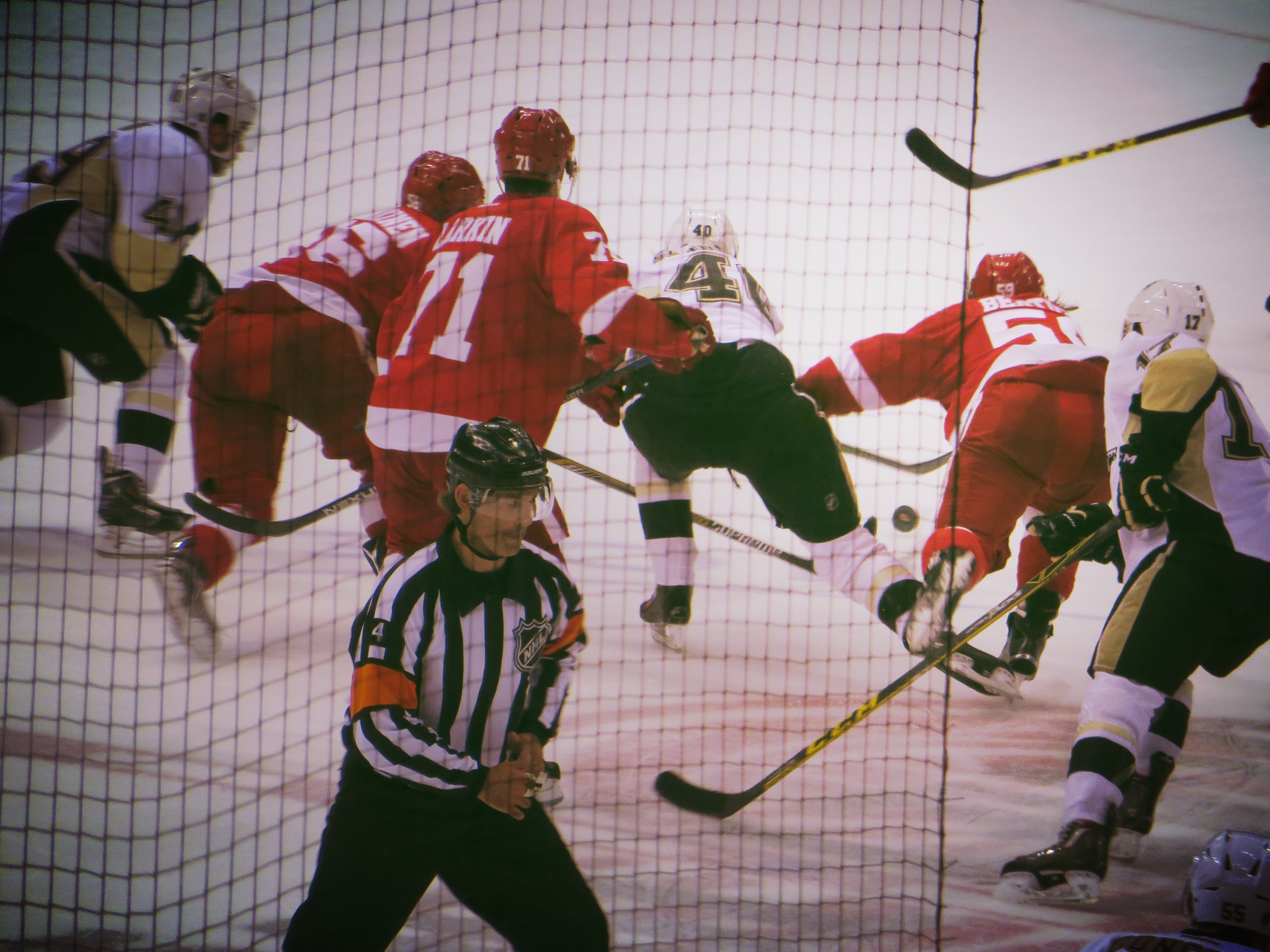
- McCauley during a 2015 preseason game
- Born: January 11, 1972 (age 54); Georgetown, Ontario, Canada
- Education: Michigan State University
- Occupation: Ice hockey referee
- Years active: 2003–present
- Employer: National Hockey League
- Father: John McCauley
Ice hockey career
- Height: 6 ft 1 in (185 cm)
- Weight: 190 lb (86 kg; 13 st 8 lb)
- Position: Defence
- Shot: Left
- Played for: Knoxville Cherokees; Las Vegas Thunder; Muskegon Fury; Fort Wayne Komets
- NHL draft: 150th overall, 1990; Detroit Red Wings
- Playing career: 1993–1997

Wesley McCauley (born January 11, 1972) is a Canadian former professional ice hockey player and current National Hockey League (NHL) referee. He is the son of Irene and John McCauley, who was also an NHL referee.

A defenceman during his playing career, McCauley became a referee after injury forced his retirement from playing in 1997. He refereed his first NHL regular season game in 2003 and became a full-time NHL referee in 2005. As of the start of the 2024–25 season, he has officiated 1,369 regular season games and 206 playoff games including nine Stanley Cup Final appearances. He wears uniform number four. (Note: The NHLOA lists 10 Stanley Cup Final assignments, but he did not appear in the 2019 Final due to an injury sustained late in the previous round.)

== Early life and amateur career ==
McCauley was born on January 11, 1972, in Georgetown, Ontario. His father was John McCauley, a former NHL referee and the NHL's Director of Officiating at the time of his death in June 1989.

McCauley entered Michigan State University and played as a defenseman for the university's team, the Spartans. He spent four years playing alongside his best friend Bryan Smolinski and together they co-captained the team in their final year. McCauley won the inaugural Terry Flanagan Memorial Award at the end of his final season in 1993.

== Professional playing career ==
After his first year at Michigan State, McCauley was drafted by the Detroit Red Wings in the 8th round of the 1990 NHL entry draft. After graduating from university, he played minor league hockey with the Las Vegas Thunder and Fort Wayne Komets of the International Hockey League, the Knoxville Cherokees of the East Coast Hockey League (ECHL), the Muskegon Fury of the Colonial Hockey League and Milan in the Italian Serie A league. He ended his playing career in 1997 due to injuries.

== Officiating career ==
After retiring from playing, McCauley followed in his father's footsteps by becoming a referee. He started off refereeing minor league matches in Ontario, before progressing to the ECHL. In 2001, he was hired by the NHL to officiate in the second-tier American Hockey League (AHL). While with the AHL, McCauley refereed his first NHL game on January 20, 2003, a 5–1 win to the Columbus Blue Jackets against the visiting Chicago Blackhawks. After being selected to officiate the AHL's Calder Cup Finals in 2004 and 2005, he was promoted to a full-time NHL referee for the 2005–2006 season.

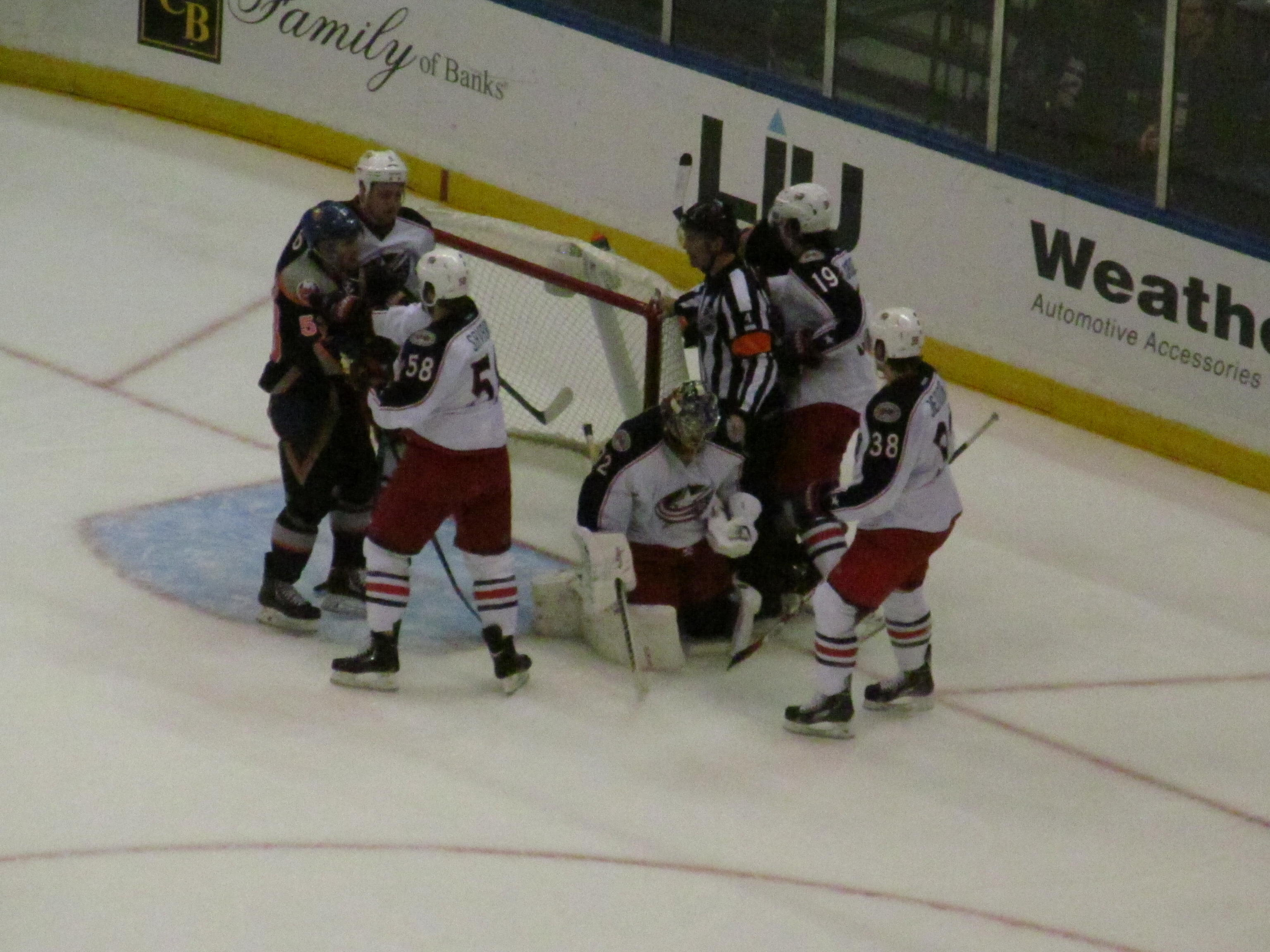
McCauley caught between Columbus Blue Jackets players during a March 2014 game against the New York Islanders

After two seasons as a full-time NHL referee, McCauley refereed his first playoff match in the 2007 Stanley Cup playoffs, in the first match of the conference quarterfinal series between the Buffalo Sabres and New York Islanders on April 12, 2007. In June 2013, he was selected as part of the officiating team for the NHL's 2013 Stanley Cup Finals between the Boston Bruins and Chicago Blackhawks. McCauley has subsequently officiated the Stanley Cup Final in 2014, 2015, 2016, 2017, 2018, 2020, 2022, 2023, 2025, and 2026. He left game six of the 2019 Western Conference finals due to an injury, and was ineligible for the 2021 finals due to a positive COVID-19 test during the conference finals. McCauley officiated his 1,000th NHL game on December 23, 2018. When coming to center ice after penalties or video reviews, he is known for his suspenseful announcements of important results.

McCauley was one of eight officials selected to work the 4 Nations Face-Off in February 2025.

== Personal life ==
McCauley is married with four children and lives in South Portland, Maine, where his wife Bethany grew up. His younger brother Blaine McCauley also played professional hockey. Wes was one of the referees in Blaine's professional debut in 2000.

== Career statistics ==
=== Regular season and playoffs ===
| | | | Regular season | | | | | Playoffs |
| Season | Team | League | GP | G | A | Pts | PIM | GP | G | A | Pts | PIM |
|---|---|---|---|---|---|---|---|---|---|---|---|---|
| 1988–89 | St. Michael’s Buzzers | MetJBHL | 38 | 9 | 29 | 38 | 81 | — | — | — | — | — |
| 1989–90 | Michigan State University | CCHA | 42 | 2 | 7 | 9 | 15 | — | — | — | — | — |
| 1990–91 | Michigan State University | CCHA | 28 | 1 | 2 | 3 | 9 | — | — | — | — | — |
| 1991–92 | Michigan State University | CCHA | 42 | 2 | 10 | 12 | 42 | — | — | — | — | — |
| 1992–93 | Michigan State University | CCHA | 33 | 3 | 6 | 9 | 34 | — | — | — | — | — |
| 1993–94 | Knoxville Cherokees | ECHL | 56 | 2 | 28 | 30 | 134 | 3 | 0 | 3 | 3 | 0 |
| 1993–94 | Las Vegas Thunder | IHL | 2 | 0 | 0 | 0 | 4 | — | — | — | — | — |
| 1994–95 | Muskegon Fury | CoHL | 63 | 9 | 31 | 40 | 70 | 13 | 7 | 7 | 14 | 4 |
| 1995–96 | Muskegon Fury | CoHL | 41 | 17 | 21 | 38 | 46 | 5 | 3 | 11 | 14 | 0 |
| 1995–96 | Fort Wayne Komets | IHL | 8 | 1 | 0 | 1 | 16 | — | — | — | — | — |
| 1996–97 | HC Milano 24 | Italy | 10 | 2 | 4 | 6 | 26 | 6 | 0 | 0 | 0 | 12 |
| 1996–97 | HC Milano 24 | Alpenliga | 18 | 1 | 6 | 7 | 30 | — | — | — | — | — |
| IHL totals | | | 10 | 1 | 0 | 1 | 20 | — | — | — | — | — |
| CoHL totals | | | 104 | 26 | 52 | 78 | 116 | 18 | 10 | 18 | 28 | 4 |

== See also ==
- List of NHL on-ice officials

== Notes ==
Awards and achievements
| Preceded by Award Created | Terry Flanagan Memorial Award; 1992–93 | Succeeded by Craig Lisko |
