= Ketchup Song =

Single by Stompin' Tom Connors

from the album Bud the Spud and Other Favourites
- Released: June 1970
- Genre: Country
- Label: Dominion
- Songwriter: Stompin' Tom Connors

Stompin' Tom Connors singles chronology
"Big Joe Mufferaw" (1970)	"Ketchup Song" (1970)	"Luke's Guitar" (1970)

"Ketchup Song" is a song written and recorded by Canadian country music artist Stompin' Tom Connors.

The song debuted at number 39 on the RPM Country Tracks chart on June 6, 1970. It peaked at number 1 on July 25, 1970.

== Background and writing ==
According to Tom the song was written after he was approached by a policeman when he was hitchhiking through Leamington, Ontario, and was told to write "a nice loveable song about our nice loveable town of Leamington". Tom said the policeman had two belts on, one around his waist and one going from his waist to the shoulder.

== Chart performance ==
Chart (1970)	Peak position
Canadian RPM Country Tracks	1
