= Andy Van Hellemond =

Canadian ice hockey referee (born 1948)

- Born: February 16, 1948 (age 78); Winnipeg, Manitoba, Canada
- Occupation: Ice hockey referee
- Years active: 1969–1997
- Employer: National Hockey League
Ice hockey career
- Hockey Hall of Fame, 1999 (Official)

Guelph City Councillor for Ward 2 — St. George's
- In office 2010–2018
- Preceded by: Vicki Beard and Ian Findlay
- Succeeded by: James Gordon and Rodrigo Goller

Andy Van Hellemond (born February 16, 1948) is a Canadian former National Hockey League referee and a member of the Hockey Hall of Fame since 1999. He is also a former municipal politician, serving on city council for the City of Guelph, Ontario, from 2010 to 2018.

== Officiating career ==
Van Hellemond's NHL officiating career began in 1969 and included 19 Stanley Cup Finals. In 1984, he became the first NHL on-ice official to wear a helmet; four years later, the NHL made helmets mandatory for all on-ice officials (however, any official who was not wearing a helmet at the time of the ruling could continue to go helmetless if they so desired). Subsequently, several officials followed his lead, and beginning with the 2006–07 NHL season, all NHL on-ice officials were compelled to wear helmets. He also officiated 1,557 regular season games and 227 playoff games. Van Hellemond has been the NHL's #1 referee for 14 consecutive times. He also officiated in two All-Star games, the 1979 Challenge Cup, and Rendez-vous '87.

From the 1977–78 to 1993–94 seasons, NHL officials' jerseys displayed their last names on the back. Due to its length, his name was displayed in two lines. From the 1994–95 NHL season until his retirement in 1997, he wore uniform number 25, which was later worn by Marc Joannette.

After retiring as an on-ice official, Van Hellemond held a management position with the East Coast Hockey League until being hired by the NHL in 2000 to replace Bryan Lewis as Director of Officiating. Van Hellemond remained director of officiating until July 2004, when he was asked by Colin Campbell to resign from the position because of concern over the former's personal gambling debts.

In July 2011, Van Hellemond served the creators of the comic strip Adam@home with a notice of intention to sue for libel over a comic that used the word "evil" in referring to Van Hellemond as "the worst and most evil ref ever." Newspapers carrying the strip, including the Toronto Star and The Boston Globe, were also served.

== Political career ==
Van Hellemond was a candidate for City Councillor during the 2010 municipal election in the city of Guelph, Ontario. He was elected to Ward Two, winning with 29.86% of the vote over both incumbents.

In 2014, Van Hellemond was elected for a second term as City Councillor for Ward 2, in the Guelph municipal election. Van Hellemond was not a candidate for City Council in the 2018 Elections.

== Awards and achievements ==
- MJHL First All-Star Team (1968)
- Selected as Manitoba's Referee of the Century
- Inducted into the Hockey Hall of Fame in 1999
- "Honoured Member" of the Manitoba Hockey Hall of Fame

== See also ==
- List of members of the Hockey Hall of Fame
- List of NHL on-ice officials

| Preceded by Bryan Lewis | Director of Officiating; 2000 - 2004 | Succeeded by Stephen Walkom |
