= Stephen Walkom =

NHL's Director of Officiating (2005-2009; since 2013)

- Born: August 8, 1963 (age 62); North Bay, Ontario
- Occupation: Director of Officiating for the National Hockey League

Stephen Walkom (born August 8, 1963) currently serves as vice president and director of officiating for the National Hockey League (NHL). This is his second stint in that position, having previously served from 2005 to 2009. From 1990 to 2004, and from 2009 to 2013, he worked as an on-ice referee for the league.

He is married to Annie and together they have three children. They reside in the Pittsburgh suburb of Moon Township, Pennsylvania.

Walkom worked as a referee, until retiring on August 3, 2005, when he was elevated to the management position. Walkom succeeded Andy Van Hellemond as director of officiating, who resigned under controversy in mid-July 2004.

He has a bachelor's degree in commerce from Laurentian University.

As a referee, he was hired in 1990 after a successful amateur career that included obtaining Level VI certification - the highest in Hockey Canada's Officiating Program - and refereeing in the Memorial Cup tournament. In the NHL (where he wore uniform number 24 from the 1994–95 NHL season until his retirement), he officiated more than 600 regular season games, 84 Stanley Cup playoff games, the 2002 Winter Olympic Games, 2004 World Cup of Hockey, and two Stanley Cup Finals. Walkom was also president of the National Hockey League Officials Association, the labor union that represents NHL referees and linesmen.

He was also the director and owner of the North American School of Officiating, a summer development camp for aspiring hockey officials in Guelph, Ontario, Canada.

The Sports Business Journal released Walkom's annual salary in July, 2010, to be US$488,736 per year.

On August 25, 2009, he announced his decision to step down from his position as the NHL's Director of Officiating to attempt a comeback at on-ice officiating as a referee. His first game back as an NHL Referee was October 21, 2009, when Florida hosted Buffalo. Since his return, he has officiated in two Stanley Cup Finals (2010 and 2011).

On August 7, 2013, he returned to the position of the NHL's Director of Officiating.

Preceded by Andy Van Hellemond	Director of Officiating; 2005 - 2009	Succeeded by Terry Gregson
Preceded by Terry Gregson	Director of Officiating; 2013 - present	Succeeded by Incumbent
