= Bill Reddick (artist) =

Canadian artist

Bill Reddick (born 1958) is a Canadian artist turned baker. Reddick began working in pottery during the 1970s before switching over to porcelain in 1996. During his artistic career, Reddick made Canada's Official State Dinnerware called the Maple Leaf Service in 2005. These plates for the governor general of Canada were borrowed for usage by leaders Stephen Harper and Barack Obama in 2009.

In Canada, Reddick had his work displayed in the Gardiner Museum and the Art Gallery of Peterborough. Outside of Canada, the Embassy of Canada to Japan received tableware in 2001 that were created by Reddick. Apart from art, Reddick started making chocolate cakes in 2012. During the COVID-19 pandemic, he focused on making cakes and stopped making porcelain. He has now resumed his career as a potter and continues to make and sell gluten-free cakes.

== Early life and education ==
Reddick was born in Toronto during the late 1950s. As a teen, Reddick lived in Lakefield, Ontario, and became interested in pottery while attending Lakefield College School. After Lakefield, Reddick co-opened a kiln in 1977 at an Erin, Ontario farmhouse. During the 1980s, Reddick started his post-secondary education at Queen's University before withdrawing in 1982.

== Career ==
The following year, Reddick began repairing a schoolhouse he bought in Northport, Ontario. Throughout the 1980s to early 1990s, Reddick and his wife continued the home improvement while working in pottery. He switched to porcelain in 1996 in order "to be doing what I wanted to do by the age of 40".

Apart from ceramics, Reddick started making chocolate cakes in 2012. During the 2015 Canadian federal election, Reddick worked for Maryam Monsef as a volunteer and made Monsef a cake after she won the Peterborough—Kawartha seat. During the COVID-19 pandemic, Reddick stopped making porcelain and focused on making cakes.

=== Style and works ===
For his porcelain, Reddick used the Song dynasty as a basis for his creations. To create his plates, Reddick used various tools including a hair dryer, syringe and spoons. From 2003 to 2006, Reddick worked on a set of dinnerware called the Maple Leaf Service. These plates were created for Adrienne Clarkson, who was the governor general of Canada. Out of 300 plates that Reddick created for the Maple Leaf Service, Reddick chose 45 of them. In 2009, his plates were borrowed from Rideau Hall and used during a lunch between leaders Stephen Harper and Barack Obama.

In Ontario, Reddick had his works shown at Exhibition Place and the Gardiner Museum during the 2000s. Reddick's porcelain objects made in 2019 were displayed in the Art Gallery of Peterborough. Outside of Canada, the Embassy of Canada to Japan received tableware that were completed in 2001 by Reddick. He was part of the 2009 Cheong-Ju International Craft Biennale in South Korea.
