= Indian Lake Chain, Ontario =

Lake in Ontario, Canada

Coordinates: 49°55′12″N 93°31′34″W

The Indian Lake Chain is a tourism designation given to a series of interconnected lakes located northwest of the community of Vermilion Bay in Kenora District, Ontario, Canada. The designation takes its name from Indian Lake that is part of the series. According to maps published by resorts located on the lakes, the Indian Lake Chain consists of ten lakes: Little Boulder Lake, Boulder Lake, Cobble Lake, Bladder Lake, Big Moose Lake, Little Moose Lake, Whitney Lake, Edward Lake, Indian Lake and Forrest Lake. However, the Atlas of Canada shows only seven lakes, as Little Boulder, Boulder, Cobble and Bladder Lakes are all simply designated "Cobble Lake". The surface elevation of the lakes is approximately 377 metres (1,237 ft), and the water level is maintained by the Forest Lake Dam. (Forest Lake is spelled with two "R"s on local maps but only one at the Atlas of Canada).

Fishing is a popular activity in the summer. Species caught in these lakes include walleye (sometimes known locally as pickerel), muskellunge (muskie), pike, smallmouth bass and lake trout.

== See also ==
- List of lakes in Ontario
