= Bryan Lewis =

Canadian politician and retired hockey referee

Bryan Lewis (born September 10, 1942) is a Canadian municipal politician and a former referee and Director of Officiating for the National Hockey League.

Lewis was born in Alliston, Ontario. His first NHL experience was in the 1967-68 NHL season. He worked more than 1000 games, 30 playoff games, and nine Stanley Cup Finals at the NHL level, and was named Director of Officiating in 1989, following the sudden death of his predecessor, John McCauley. In this position, he oversaw a staff of 90, as well as the officiating of both the NHL and the AHL. He retired from this position in 2000. Lewis is still active in hockey, helping officials at the junior level. Bryan is currently Referee In Chief for the Central Hockey League and Ontario University Athletics.

In November 2000, Lewis successfully ran for a position on the Halton Hills, Ontario town council. He has held the Council position for 4 terms.

Preceded by John McCauley	Director of Officiating; 1989–2000	Succeeded by Andy Van Hellemond
