= John McCauley (judge) =

American judge (1834–1924)

John McCauley (9 December 1834 – 10 January 1924) of Seneca County, Ohio was a Justice serving on the Ohio Supreme Court Commission, created to address an overage of cases before the court. Governor Charles Foster appointed McCauley and four other men, who served from April 17, 1883 to April 16, 1885. Following his service on the court, McCauley returned to private practice in Seneca County, partnering with Henry J. Weller on June 10, 1885 establishing the law firm of McCauley and Weller.

Born in Columbiana County, Ohio, McCauley was educated at Delaware, Ohio. McCauley and Foster both attended the Seneca County Academy in 1859. McCauley was admitted to the bar in 1860, locating at Tiffin. He was prosecuting attorney of Seneca County from 1865 to 1869, also serving as a member of the Constitutional Convention of 1851. In October, 1879, he was elected judge of the Court of Common Pleas of his district.
