= Wally Harris (referee) =

Canadian ice hockey referee (1935–2024)

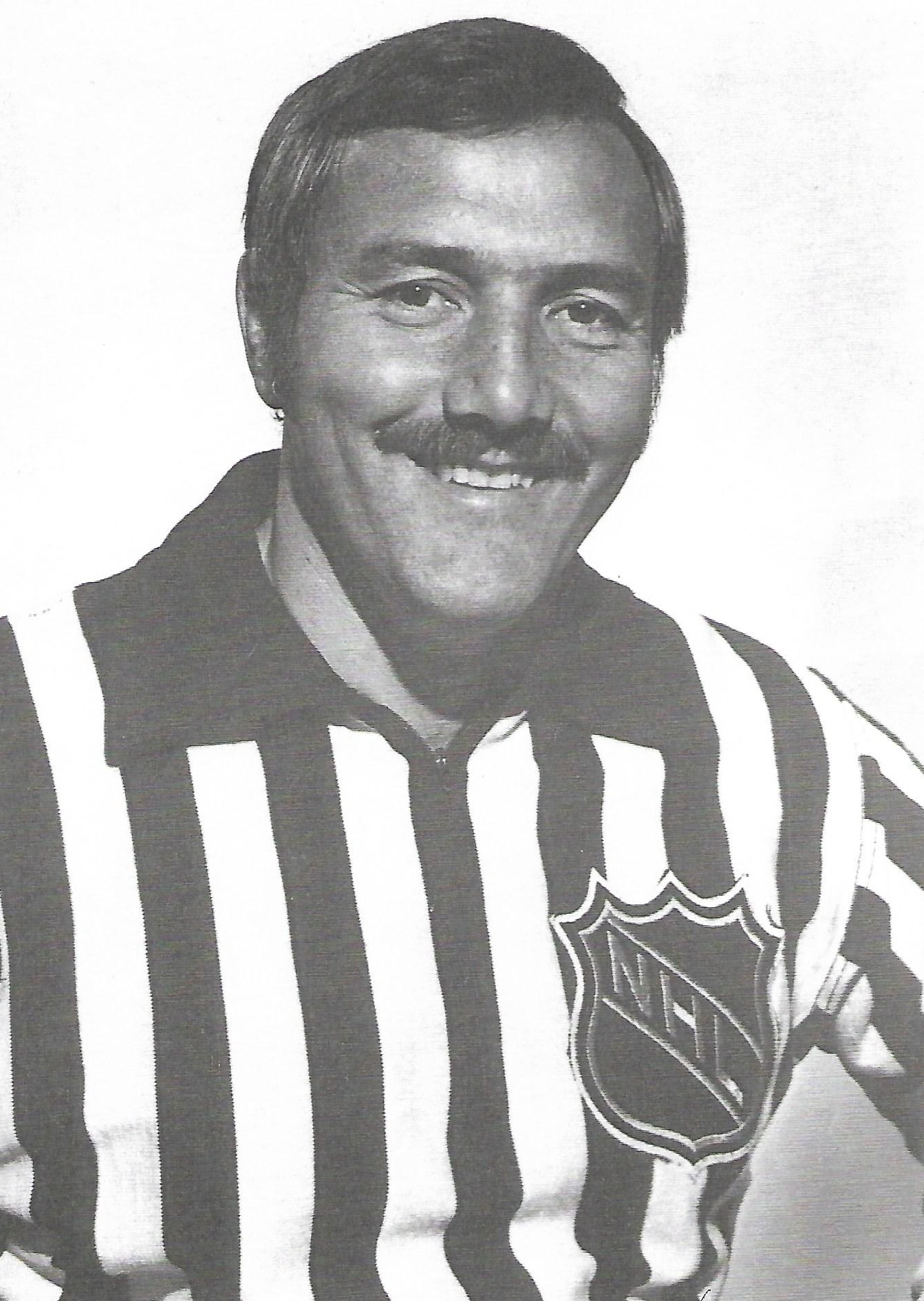
- Born: November 23, 1935; Montreal, Quebec, Canada
- Died: April 17, 2024 (aged 88); Montreal, Quebec, Canada
- Occupation: NHL referee

Wallis Harris (November 23, 1935 – April 17, 2024) was a Canadian National Hockey League referee whose career spanned 39 years including 17 as an NHL on ice official, 3 as the NHL's first Director of Officiating, and 16 as an NHL supervisor of officials. Harris refereed many historical hockey games, such as the famous 3–3 tie between the Montreal Canadiens and the Soviet Union's Central Red Army team on December 31, 1975, a game fondly remembered and widely regarded as one of the best played. Over the course of his hockey career, he has refereed 953 regular-season games, 85 playoff games, and six Stanley Cup Finals series.

== Background ==
Harris was born in Montreal, Quebec on November 23, 1935. He died at a hospital in the Montreal area, on April 17, 2024, at the age of 88.

== Career ==
In 1951, Harris played for the Lachine Maroons in the Quebec Amateur Hockey Association (QAHA), becoming a referee in 1956.

In 1963, he signed his first contract with the NHL, officiating for various leagues, such as the Western Hockey Association, Central Hockey League, and American Hockey League.

=== NHL ===
Starting in 1966, Harris started officiating in the NHL, refereeing 953 regular season games and 85 playoff games until 1983. His first game was on December 11, 1966, between the Montreal Canadiens and New York Rangers. On January 13, 1968, he refereed the game that included the tragic incident in which Bill Masterton of the Minnesota North Stars was knocked to the ice and suffered a head injury resulting in his death. In 1983, he was the first NHL referee to officiate the Spengler Cup and did so for three years. During this time, he was also involved in various training camps in Innsbruck, Austria; Canazei, Italy; and Davos, Switzerland. His last game was on May 12, 1983, during the Stanley Cup Finals between the Edmonton Oilers and New York Islanders. In 1989, Harris was the assistant director of officials to Brian Lewis. In 2002, he retired from the NHL.
