= Naden Boats =

Line of aluminum fishing boats

Naden Boats is a line of aluminum fishing boats manufactured in Canada by Temagami Boat Manufacturing Inc. Six models are offered, ranging from 11’11" to 16’ in overall length. They are noted for their expanded polystyrene flotation, rigid construction, and semi-V planing hull with five keels.

== History ==
=== Webster City, Iowa, USA: 1955-1972 ===
Naden Industries, a company in Webster City, Iowa, built the first Naden boat in 1955. Made from aluminum, the hull design was a semi-V bottom. By 1964, eight models were offered:

model	type	LOA	beam	weight (lbs)	weight capacity (lbs)	maximum horsepower (outboard motor)
Skipper	open, semi-V	12′0″	4′6″	127	555	10
Resorter	open, semi-V	13′8″	4′10″	150	750	18
Ski-Mate	runabout, semi-V	14′0″	5′7″	360	980	45
Fisherman	open, semi-V	14′2″	5′1″	217	805	35
Big Fisherman	open, semi-V	15′10″	5′8″	275	1115	40
Chieftain	utility, semi-V	15′10″	5′8″	295	1115	45
Rocket	runabout, semi-V	16′0″	6′4″	450	1430	75
Thunder Hawk	runabout, semi-V	18′0″	6′4″	500	1620	100

The factory was located at 505 Fair Ave.

From its founding in 1935 (as Naden and Sons Electric Scoreboard Company), Naden Industries’ primary business was the manufacturing of electric scoreboards. By the early 1970s, Naden was selling most of its boats to Canadian customers. Naden stopped manufacturing boats in 1972 and spoke to one of its Canadian dealers to see if it would be interested in taking over the boat line.

=== Vermilion Bay, Ontario, Canada: 1974-2011 ===
Wilderness Enterprises (later Gordon Enterprises) of Vermilion Bay, Ontario was the first dealer that the Iowa-based Naden Industries had for its boats in Canada. Naden boats had proven to be popular in northwestern Ontario, especially with operators of tourist lodges. In the early 1970s, Gardner Naden (of Naden Industries) and Boyd Gordon (of Gordon Enterprises) discussed the possibility of relocating the Naden boat factory to Vermilion Bay, as most of Naden's boats were sold in the Vermilion Bay area. The process of purchasing Naden Boats from its American owners began.

Negotiations took nearly one year. Gordon was joined by partners Al Adolfson and Ed Gawley. Kenora – Rainy River MP John M Reid provided support and was instrumental in helping Naden obtain a $67,000 Department of Regional Economic Expansion (DREE) grant. Assistance was also provided by the Northern Ontario Development Corporation (NODC). MPP Leo Bernier also cleared obstacles for the new company. Jack Hanslip was brought on as director of marketing, and Roland Gauthier (with extensive experience in boat manufacturing) as the plant manager.

Construction on a new 14,000 sq. ft. factory began in 1973 on the east side of Hwy 105 just north of Hwy 17. Gardner Naden, one of the designers of the first Naden boat, traveled to the new Vermilion Bay plant to help it tool up.

The first boat in the Canadian operation was completed in early 1974, and 1200 were built in the first 12 months of production. By 1975, six models were built on four production lines, and the factory produced 7 to 8 boats per day with a workforce of 18. By 1986, 20 people were employed by Naden.

=== Temagami, Ontario, Canada (from 2011-2014) ===
In 2011, Naden was dealing with a labour shortage in Vermilion Bay and faced possible closure. Andre Lamothe, owner of Temagami Marine, was one of Naden's biggest dealers. Upon hearing of the company's difficulties, he embarked on the process of purchasing it and moving it to Temagami, Ontario. With the coordination of funds from four federal agencies (Temfund, South Timiskaming CFDC, Claybelt CFDC, and NeoNet) and the Yves Landry Foundation (funded by FedNor) Naden was relocated to a 6,000 sq. ft. facility on the Temagami Marine property in December 2011.

With the help of two expert Naden builders who followed the company to Temagami, the first boat was produced in February 2012 and shown at the Central Ontario Boat Show & Sale that same month.

In its first year of production in Temagami, Naden Boats employed 13 people full-time.

Naden boats have not been manufactured since 2014 following the passing of the owner Andre Lamoth.

== Current operations ==
The original boat design continues, with some decorative changes:

- trim is applied after painting
- rivets are left unpainted
- a new colour option, black, in addition to the traditional options of red and blue

Production has been modernized, using a CNC router table to cut the aluminum pieces. All models are now pre-wired for a bow light. Production is targeted at 1000 boats per year.

Available models:

model	name	LOA	beam	weight (lbs)	weight capacity	maximum horsepower (outboard motor)
N-112S	Laker	11′11″	62″	150	670	10
N-114S	Light Fisherman	13′6″	62″	160	770	15
N-14S	Fisherman	14′3″	65″	240	900	25
N-14CL	Canadian Laker	14′3″	72″	265	1235	35
N16S	Big Fish	16′0″	68″	288	1300	35
N-16CBL	Canadian Big Laker	16′0″	75″	310	1609	40

In July 2012, Naden's workforce increased from 13 to 15.

== Environmental considerations ==
One of the biggest changes to the production of Naden boats takes into consideration the proximity of the plant to Lake Temagami. Lamothe knew that using the traditional paint process was not an option: the airborne paint particles are toxic, and a lot of heat and airflow is needed. Automotive paint is no longer used, in favour of a new acid-free paint process:

- aluminum is pre-treated with a mild alkaline solution
- powder-coat painting using an electrostatic coating process
- curing in an infra-red oven at 205 °C for 10 minutes

Other environmental considerations include winter heating from waste production heat and plans for a geothermal heating/cooling system.

== Corporate responsibility ==
In 2013, Naden Boats partnered with the Canadian Breast Cancer Foundation CIBC Run for the Cure - North Bay. Naden employees donated their time and purpose-built a 14’ Fisherman boat, painting it pink. Tohatsu supplied an outboard motor, and other suppliers donated a trailer, mooring package and PFDs. Raffle tickets were sold as the boat was displayed in various locations across northeastern Ontario. “The Pink Boat Tour 2013” raised $20,000 for the CBCF and was recognized by the CBCF Ontario Region with a Corporate Commitment Award in the spring of 2014.
The partnership continues with “The Pink Boat Tour 2014”.
