= Grew Manufacturing =

Canadian boat manufacturing company

Grew Manufacturing was a Canadian company that manufactured boats from 1882 to 2011. It started as Gidley Boat Works on the shores of Georgian Bay. In the late 1920s, Arthur Grew, a master boat maker from Penetangushine, took over the business and changed its name. The company grew and modernized its product line, eventually switching from wood construction to fibreglass lamination. Grew Manufacturing built its boats in advanced facilities in Ontario, under the brands Grew, Cutter and Profisher. The company faced financial difficulties due to the 2008 recession and the exchange rate fluctuations. In 2011, the company had about 25 employees, but also had debts of more than $2 million and about 100 creditors. The owner and president, David Cameron, died in a shootout with the police in February 2011, after injuring the sales manager, Don Vanderstadt, with a gun. The family tried to sell the business, but failed. The company went into receivership and ceased its operations.

== History ==
Grew Manufacturing traces its roots to Gidley Boat Works, which was founded in 1882 by Henry Edward Gidley. The company was located on the shores of Georgian Bay, in Penetangushine, Ontario. The company specialized in building wooden boats, such as canoes, rowboats, sailboats, and motorboats. The company also built custom boats for wealthy clients, such as the Royal Canadian Yacht Club and the Toronto Harbour Commission.

In the late 1920s, Arthur Grew, a master boatmaker from Penetangushine, joined the company and became its manager. He later bought the company and renamed it Grew Manufacturing. Arthur Grew was known for his innovative designs and high-quality craftsmanship. He introduced new models of boats, such as the Grew Cruiser, the Grew Runabout, and the Grew Outboard. He also experimented with new materials, such as plywood, aluminum, and fibreglass. He won several awards and recognition for his boats, such as the Canadian National Exhibition Grand Prize in 1936 and the New York World's Fair Gold Medal in 1939.

Arthur Grew retired in 1960 and sold the company to his son, John Grew, who continued to expand and modernize the business. He built a new factory in Penetangushine and increased the production capacity. He also diversified the product line, offering Bowrider and Cuddy cruisers with outboard and inboard motors made of fibreglass. He marketed the boats under the brands Grew, Cutter, and Profisher. He also exported the boats to the United States and Europe.

In the 1980s, John Grew sold the company to a group of investors, who continued to operate the business under the name Grew Manufacturing. The company faced competition from other boat makers, such as Sea Ray, Bayliner, and Four Winns. The company also faced challenges from the 2008 recession and the exchange rate fluctuations, which affected the demand and the profitability of the boats. The company struggled to pay its creditors.

In February 2011, the owner and president of the company, David Cameron, shot and injured the sales manager, Don Vanderstadt, with a gun at the factory. He then fled the scene and was pursued by the police. He exchanged fire with the police and was fatally wounded. He died at the hospital. The motive for the shooting was unclear, but it was speculated that it was related to the financial troubles of the company.

After the death of David Cameron, his family tried to sell the business but failed to find a buyer. The company went into receivership and ceased its operations. The factory and the assets of the company were auctioned off. The company's website was shut down.

== Launches ==
Grew, Cutter and Profisher are brands built in Ontario.

- 158 LE Classic
- 168 GR/BR
- 174 GR/BR
- 174 GR/BR
- 174 GR/BR
- 175 GRS/BR
- 184 GRS/BR
- 188 GR/SK
- 188 SKI/BR
- 194 GRS/BR
- 204 GRS/BR
- 208 GRS/CD
- 224 GRS/BR
- 244 GRS/CD
- SC l BASS BOAT l WIDE
- SC l BASS BOAT l WIDE
- GRS l CABIN CRUISER
- GRS l CABIN CRUISER
- GRS l CABIN CRUISER
- GRS l CABIN CRUISER
- GRS l CABIN CRUISER
- GR l CUDDY CABIN
- GR l CUDDY CABIN
- GRX l CUDDY CABIN
- GRX l CUDDY CABIN

== Receivership ==
The company's finances were seriously affected by the 2008 recession and subsequent exchange rate changes.

During the winter of 2011. Don Vanderstadt, the company's sales manager, was injured from gun fire and other employees fled the boatyard as result of hearing that shots had been fired. The team had returned from the Toronto International Boat Show. Owner and President David Cameron died after an exchange of gunfire with police Feb 11th, 2011, near Kemble. With David's death, the family attempted to sell the business, but were unsuccessful. The company had liabilities of more than $2 million and about 100 creditors. 1673747 Ontario Inc. operated as Grew Manufacturing, while 2045227 Ontario Ltd. operated, Courage thinks, as Profisher or Profisher Direct.
