= The Hockey Song =

1973 song by Stompin' Tom Connors

Song by Stompin' Tom Connors

from the album Stompin' Tom and the Hockey Song
- Language: English
- Released: 1973
- Composer: Stompin' Tom Connors
- Lyricist: Stompin' Tom Connors

Official audio
- " The Hockey Song" on YouTube

"The Hockey Song", sometimes mistakenly called "The Good Old Hockey Game", is a song written and originally performed by Canadian folksinger Stompin' Tom Connors. The song's first release was on Connors' 1973 album, Stompin' Tom and the Hockey Song. The song was played at Ottawa Senators games in 1992, after which Pat Burns, then coach of the Toronto Maple Leafs, insisted it be played in Toronto as well. The song is now played throughout both Canadian and American NHL arenas, as well in the home arenas of European hockey teams (e.g. Dinamo Rīga).

== Content ==
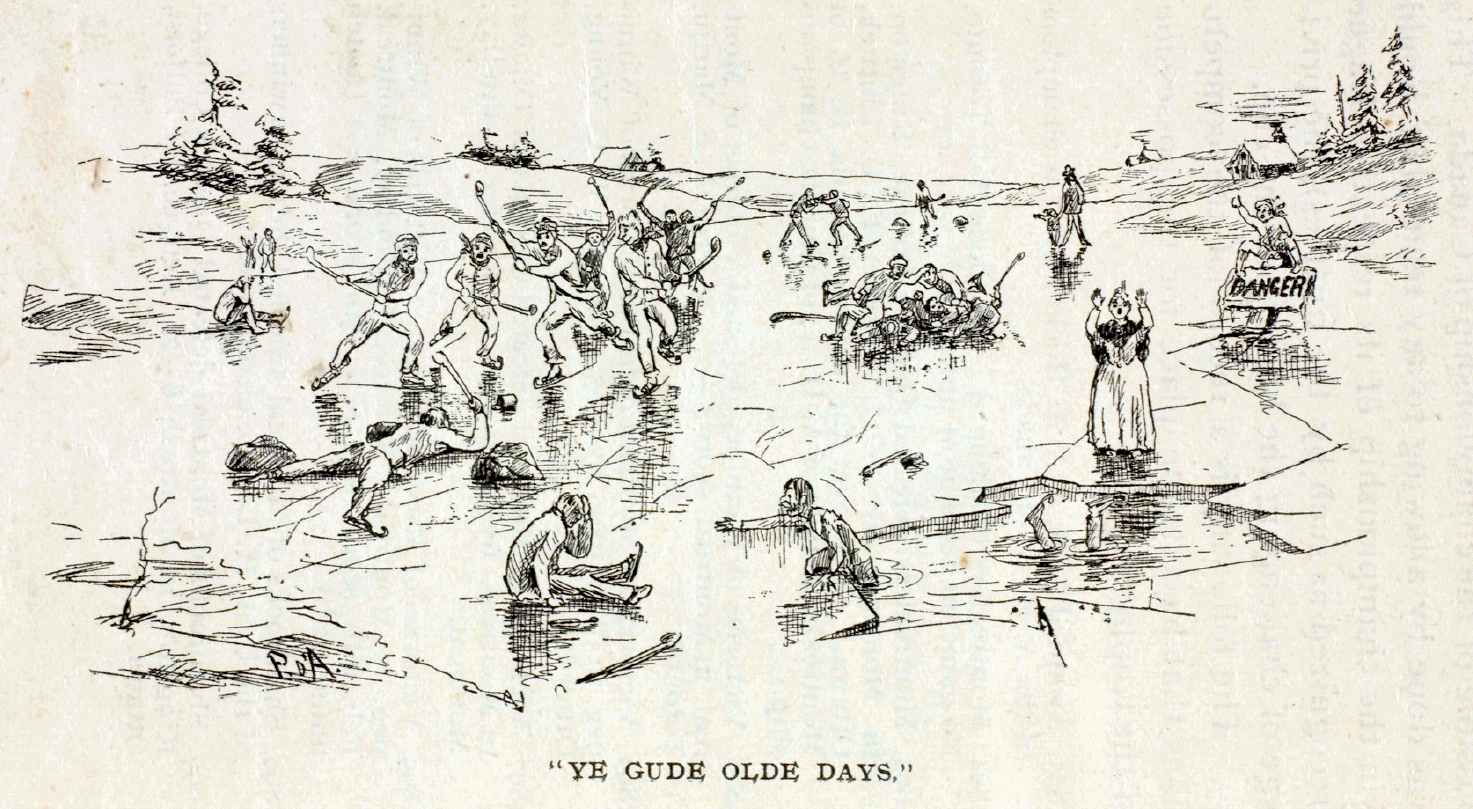
The "good old days" of ice hockey in Canada.

The verses of the song are split up so that each one describes a period of play in a typical hockey game. In the first verse Connors sings, "Someone roars, Bobby scores!". In the last verse Connors sings that it is the last game of the playoffs and the "Stanley Cup is all filled up for the champs that win the drink". He later also sings "The puck is in, the home team wins!". In concert he would sometimes change "home team" to an actual team based on where he was playing. One example was at the closing ceremonies for Maple Leaf Gardens, when he changed the last game line from the playoffs to "the Garden", and mentioned that the Leafs have won.

In the song's chorus, Connors sings, "The good old hockey game is the best game you can name, and the best game you can name is the good old hockey game."

== Popular culture ==
The song has been covered numerous times. One cover version was used in combination with Connors' recording as the theme song for the 1990s CTV series, Power Play, while another was used to open NHL broadcasts on CTV Sportsnet in the late 1990s and early 2000s.

In 2004, the American comedy-talk show Late Night with Conan O'Brien taped a week's worth of shows in Canada. During one of these telecasts, Connors, making one of the first American TV appearances of his entire career, was brought on to perform "The Hockey Song".

With the expiration of CBC Television's licence of "The Hockey Theme" for Hockey Night in Canada in 2008, Connors let it be known that he would be open to an appropriate licensing offer for his song as a replacement theme song.

"The Hockey Song" was re-recorded in 2008 by Connors as the "new 2008 version" and was featured on his studio album, The Ballad of Stompin' Tom. Connors thought that the original recording in the 1970s was "too thin".

In 2011, a cover of the song was used by NBC Sports in a promo for the 2012 NHL Winter Classic. Multiple fans produced versions of the song with lyrics changed to reflect the 2012–13 labour disputes.

On 6 March 2013, Great Big Sea performed "The Hockey Song" in concert in San Francisco as a tribute to Stompin' Tom Connors, who had died earlier that day.

On 27 October 2018, the song was added to the Canadian Songwriters Hall of Fame, with a ceremony at an NHL game between the Toronto Maple Leafs and the Winnipeg Jets at Scotiabank Arena in Toronto, including a performance by country singer Tim Hicks and a plaque presentation to Connors' son and family.

The song is featured in the "Hockey Night in Burnaby" episode of Being Ian and the 2022 hockey-themed episode "Top Goon", in Season 34 of The Simpsons as well as season 4 of the Canadian sitcom Corner Gas.

In 2025, Tim Hortons reimagined the song with new lyrics referring to American football, player Travis Kelce, and the associated Super Bowl instead of hockey.

== Chart performance ==
Chart (2013)	Peak position
Canada (Canadian Hot 100)	29

== Certifications ==
Certifications for "The Hockey Song"
Region	Certification	Certified units/sales
Canada (Music Canada)	Platinum	80,000^{‡}
^{‡} Sales+streaming figures based on certification alone.
