= Pubnico =

Pubnico may refer to the following places in Nova Scotia, Canada, all located on the shores of Pubnico Harbour:

- Centre East Pubnico, Nova Scotia
- East Pubnico, Nova Scotia
- Lower East Pubnico, Nova Scotia
- Lower West Pubnico, Nova Scotia
- Middle East Pubnico, Nova Scotia
- Middle West Pubnico, Nova Scotia
- Pubnico (village), Nova Scotia
- Upper West Pubnico, Nova Scotia
- West Pubnico, Nova Scotia
