= Bud the Spud =

Single by Stompin' Tom Connors

from the album Bud The Spud and Other Favourites
- Released: 1969
- Genre: Country
- Label: Dominion
- Songwriter: Stompin' Tom Connors

Stompin' Tom Connors singles chronology
"Bud the Spud" (1969)	"Big Joe Mufferaw" (1970)

"Bud the Spud" is a song by Canadian singer-songwriter Stompin' Tom Connors. The song is an account of a trucker who hauls potatoes from Prince Edward Island, Connors' home province.

== History ==
"Bud the Spud" was released in 1969 on Connors' album Bud The Spud and Other Favourites. It was written about his truck-driving friend, Bud Roberts. Connors crisscrossed Canada, performing it along with his many other songs about Canada, at first in small venues. In this way the song became known through word-of-mouth as well as through radio airplay on CBC Radio.

The song was turned into an illustrated children's book in 1994 featuring Bud the truck driver, and his dog. The song was made available digitally for the first time on Canada Day in 2008.

== Popular culture ==
In 2008, "Bud the Spud" was the first song played on the new Spud Radio station in Pemberton, British Columbia. In 2013, a group of New Democrat Members of Parliament performed the song in the Canadian Parliament Building on their way to Question Period.

== Chart performance ==
"Bud the Spud" peaked at number 26 on the RPM Country Tracks chart on February 28, 1970.

Chart (1969–1970)	Peak position
Canadian RPM Country Tracks	26

== Certifications ==
Certifications for "Bud the Spud"
Region	Certification	Certified units/sales
Canada (Music Canada)	Gold	40,000^{‡}
^{‡} Sales+streaming figures based on certification alone.
