= Sudbury Saturday Night =

1967 song by Stompin' Tom Connors

Single by Stompin' Tom Connors

from the album The Northlands' Own Tom Connors
- B-side: "Don Valley Jail"
- Written: 1965
- Released: 1967
- Genre: Country music
- Length: 2:26
- Label: Rebel Records
- Songwriter: Stompin' Tom Connors
- Producer: John C. Irvine

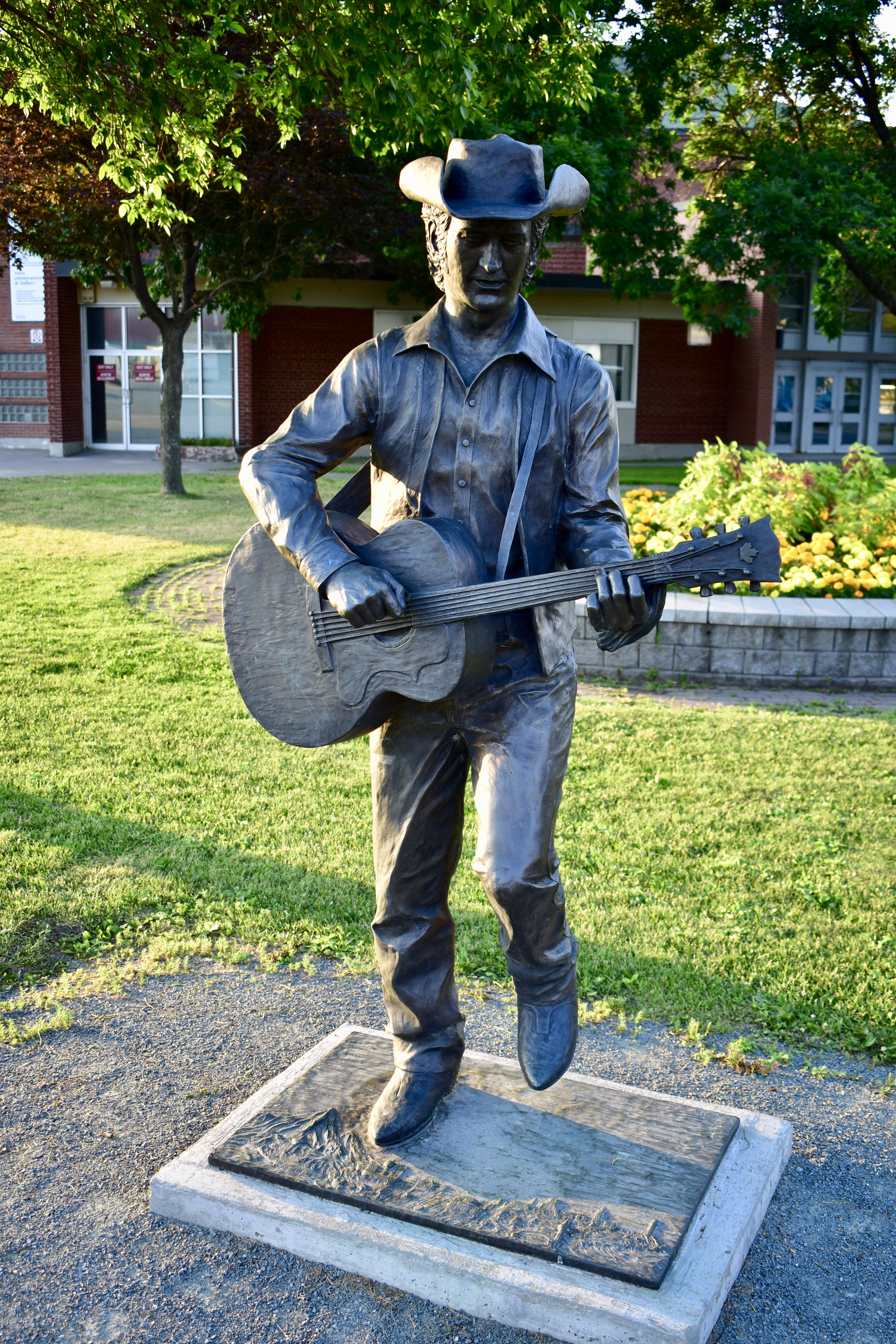
The 2015 bronze statue of Stompin' Tom, with Connors' left hand positioned for chord of C−, one of the major chords in the song "Sudbury Saturday Night".

"Sudbury Saturday Night" is one of the most famous songs by Stompin' Tom Connors, which depicts the hard-drinking, hard-partying social life of hard rock miners in the Northern Ontario mining city of Sudbury.

The song's chorus is:

Yeah, the girls are out to bingo
And the boys are gettin' stinko
And we'll think no more of Inco
On a Sudbury Saturday night

Originally released on Connors' 1967 debut album The Northlands' Own Tom Connors, the song also reappeared on his 1972 album Bud the Spud, his live album Live at the Horseshoe, the compilations A Proud Canadian and 25 of the Best Stompin' Tom Souvenirs, and the 1995 rerelease of The Northlands' Own Tom Connors under the title Northlands Zone.

Connors wrote the song in Sudbury when he was booked for a three-week performance at the Towne House. On the fiftieth anniversary of the song, a commemorative video was made in Sudbury with people at the tavern singing the song.

"Sudbury Saturday Night" was covered by Canadian musician Kim Mitchell in 1998 on the compilation Summer Dock Party.
