= Vermilion Bay, Ontario =

Vermilion Bay
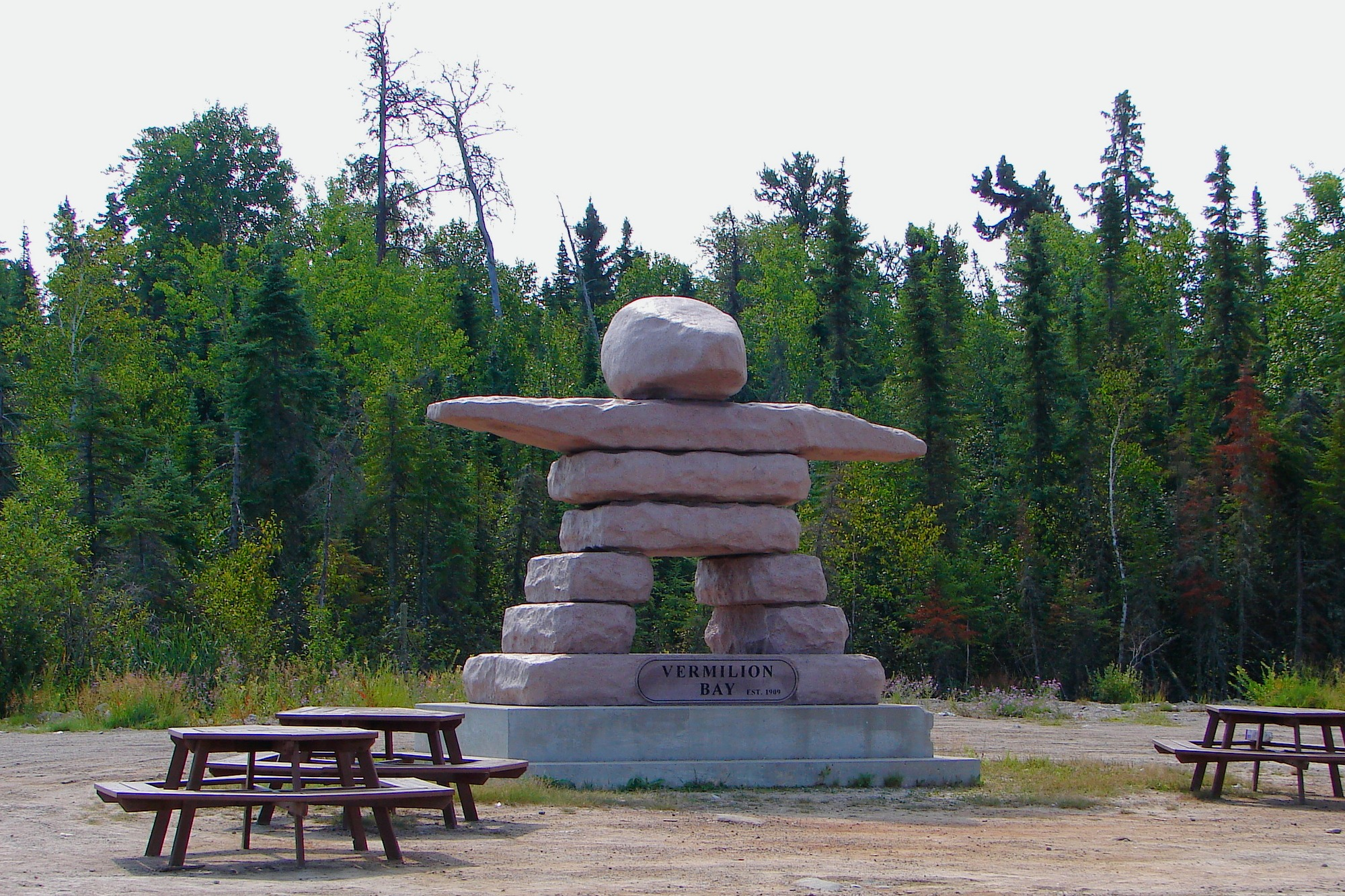

- Location of Vermilion Bay in Ontario
- Coordinates: 49°51′19″N 93°24′08″W
- Country: Canada
- Province: Ontario
- Region: Northwestern Ontario
- District: Kenora
- Township: Machin
- Elevation: 374 m (1,227 ft)
- Time zone: UTC-6 (Central Time Zone)
  - Summer (DST): UTC-5 (Central Time Zone)
- Postal code FSA: P0X
- Area code: 807

Vermilion Bay is an unincorporated community on Vermilion Bay on Eagle Lake in the township of Machin, Kenora District in northwestern Ontario, Canada. It is located on Ontario Highway 17 (Trans-Canada Highway) between the cities of Kenora to the west and Dryden to the east.

== History ==
Archives of the Hudson's Bay Company, which had a post on Eagle Lake, refer to Vermilion Station on the Canadian Pacific Railway. In 1881, Vermilion Bay was a construction camp where railway workers were based. In 1902, Vermilion Bay station was used to send material to the ongoing construction of the Grand Trunk Pacific Railway (later to become part of Canadian National Railway). In 1903, a one-room school was built, and the township was first surveyed in 1906. The early 1900s also saw gold and soapstone mining taking place on the southwest shore of Eagle Lake, with Vermilion Bay used as a supply centre. The 1930s saw activity with the construction of the Trans-Canada Highway, and the 1940s were busy with activity in the forest industry — again with Vermilion Bay station on the CPR playing a role.

Tourist camps were becoming more prevalent as the 1940s progressed, with many still in operation. Outfitting the guests of these camps brought economic activity to the area, such as the Naden Boat factory, in operation from 1974 to 2011. The factory employed approximately 20 people.

Granite quarrying began in the 1950s at a site just west of Vermilion Bay and continues to the present day.

== Recreation ==
Fishing is a popular activity for visitors to Vermilion Bay. Fishing locations in the area include Eagle Lake, the Indian Lake Chain, Clay Lake, Canyon Lake, Cedar Lake and Perrault Lake.

== Transportation ==
The community is the southern terminus for both Ontario Highway 105, which heads north to the town of Red Lake, and Ontario Highway 647, which heads northwest to Blue Lake Provincial Park.

Vermilion Bay is served by Vermilion Bay Airport and Vermilion Bay Water Aerodrome.

The Canadian Pacific Railway transcontinental main line passes through the community, and the CPR have a bulk forest products facility in the community. There is no passenger service.

== Media ==
The community has one licensed radio station, CKQV-FM, which also focuses on the larger population centers of Kenora, Dryden, and Sioux Lookout.

== See also ==
- List of unincorporated communities in Ontario
