= Director of Officiating (NHL) =

The Director of Officiating for the National Hockey League (NHL) heads the league's officiating department and reports directly to the senior vice president of the league. The director of officiating is assisted by officiating managers in the NHL's Toronto office.

== List of Directors of Officiating ==
- Wally Harris (1983–1986)
- John McCauley (1986–1989)
- Bryan Lewis (1989 – July 2000)
- Andy Van Hellemond (July 2000 – July 2004)
- Stephen Walkom (August 2005 – September 2009, August 2013 – present)
- Terry Gregson (September 2009 – August 2013)
