= List of family relations in the NHL =

This is a list of family relations in the National Hockey League. Since the creation of the National Hockey League in 1917, family members have been involved in all aspects of the league. Although most connections are among players, there have been family members involved in coaching and managing as well.

Since 1917, 47 pairs of brothers have played together on the same team; among them, ten have won the Stanley Cup together. Brothers have also squared off against each other five times in the Stanley Cup Finals, most recently in 2003. Twenty-six sons have followed in their fathers' footsteps and played for his team. Only once has a father played with his sons, when Gordie Howe played with Mark and Marty for one season with the Hartford Whalers.

The Chicago Blackhawks have seen the most familial connections with 31: twenty sets of brothers, five father-son combinations, three uncle-nephew combinations, and three sets of cousins.

The Sutter family has had the largest number of family members – nine – play, coach and manage in the NHL. The original six brothers (Brent, Brian, Darryl, Duane, Rich, and Ron) and three of their sons (cousins Brandon, Brett, and Brody) result in multiple brother/father-son/uncle-nephew/cousin combinations.

Below is a list of family relations throughout the NHL as players, head coaches, general managers, and officials. Owners are not included, as inheritance makes these relations more routine.

Names in bold have won the Stanley Cup. Names in italics are members of the Hockey Hall of Fame. An asterisk (*) denotes a current (2026–27 season) NHL player.

== Siblings ==
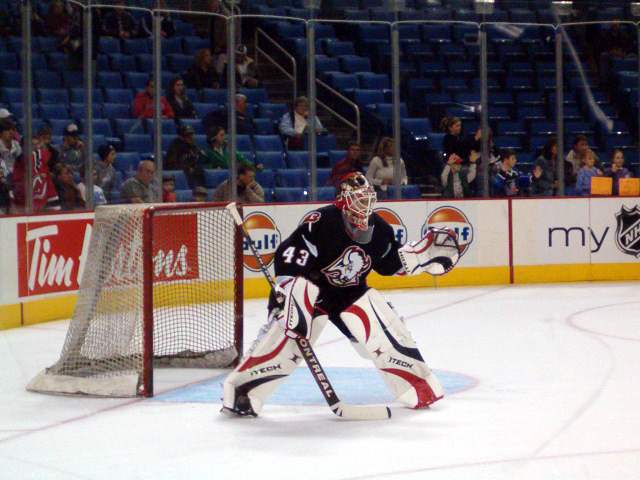
Martin Biron, pictured here with the Buffalo Sabres, is the brother of Mathieu.

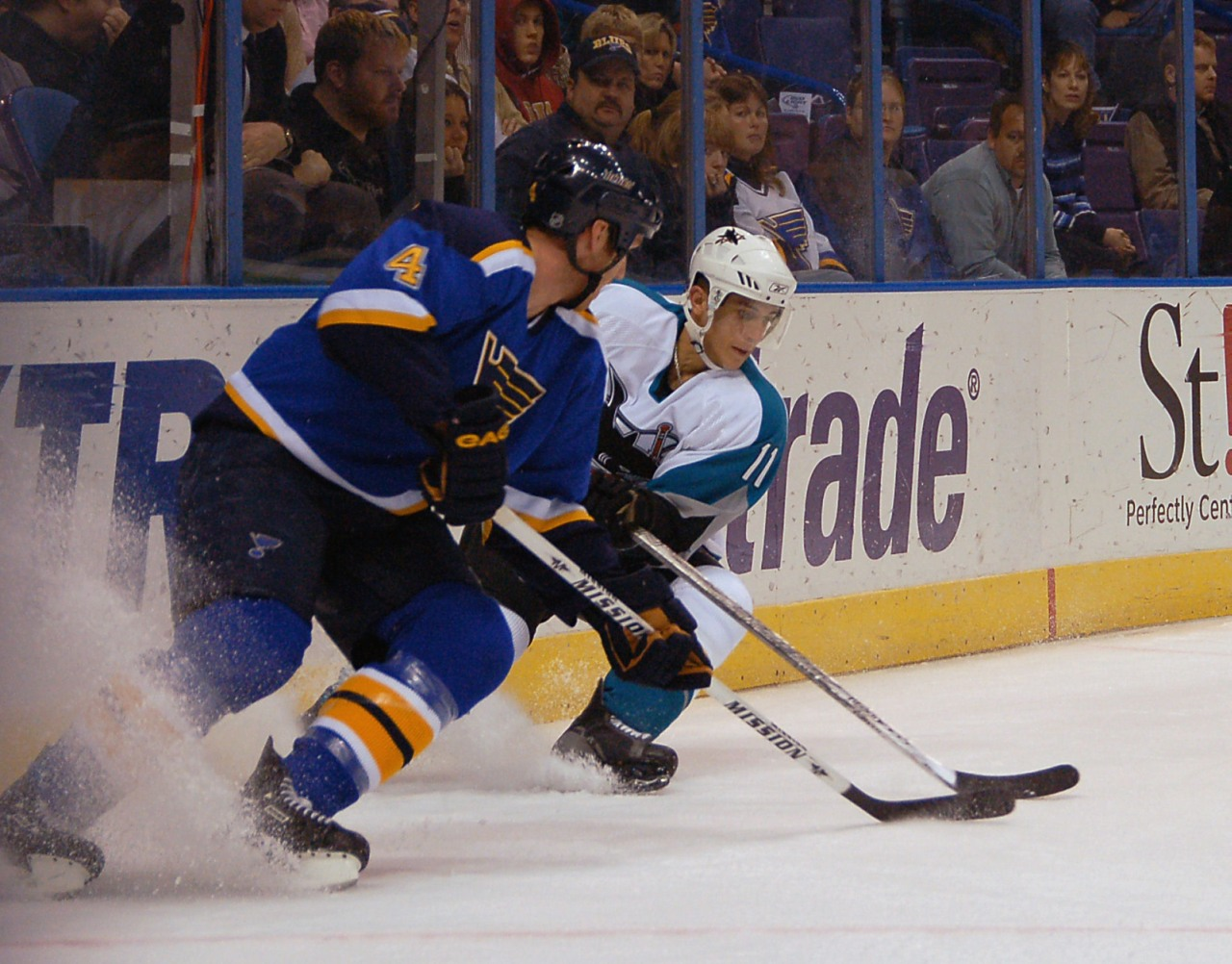
Marcel Goc had a sustained career with the San Jose Sharks, but his brother Sascha only played 22 games in the NHL.

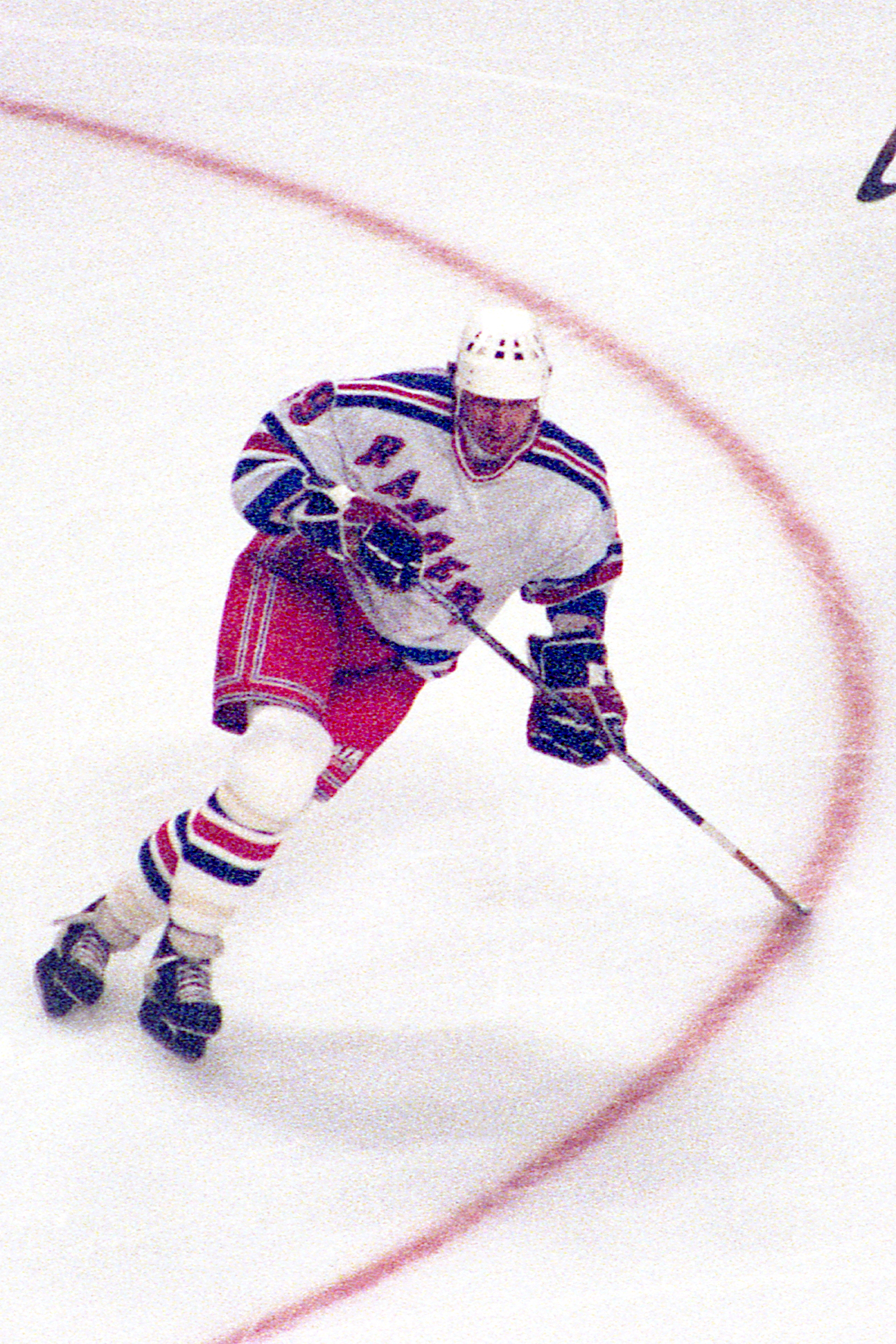
Wayne Gretzky's younger brother (Brent), made it to the NHL.

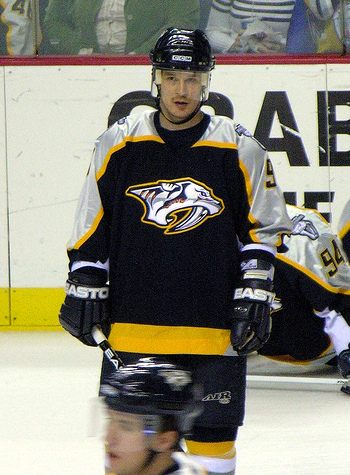
Paul Kariya's younger brother Steve played a short stint with the Vancouver Canucks.

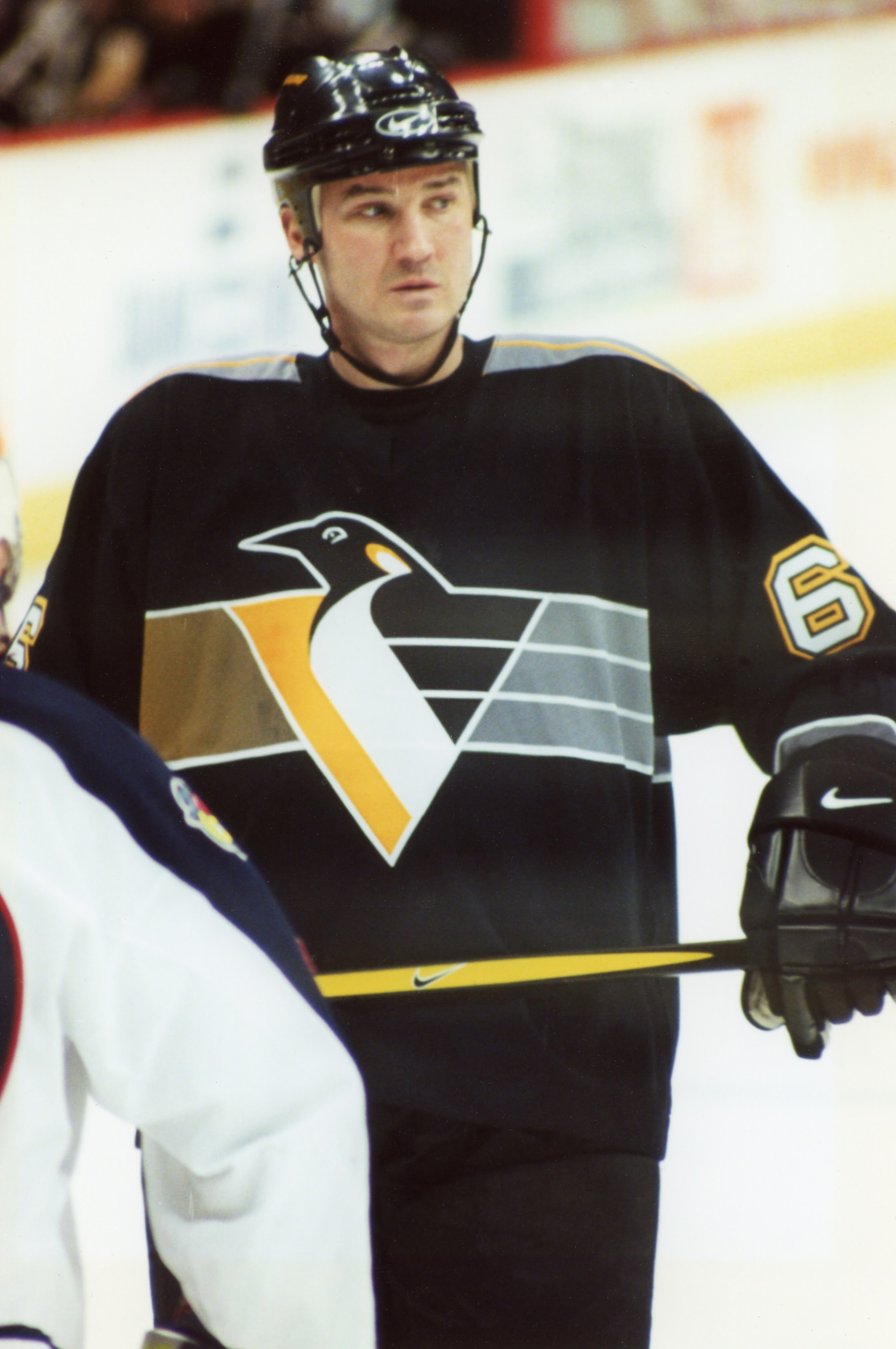
Mario Lemieux has an older brother Alain, but he is no relation to either Claude or Jocelyn Lemieux.

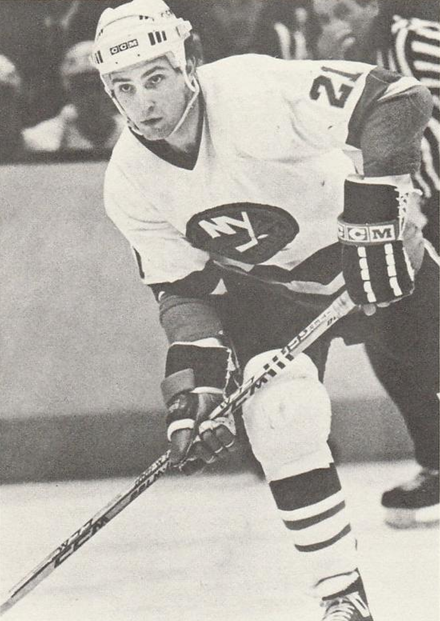
Of the six Sutter brothers, Brent Sutter played the most games (1,111) and recorded the most points (829).

Surname	Siblings	Country	Notes
Allen	George, Viv	Canada	Viv only played 11 games in the NHL for the New York Americans.
Allison	Dave, Mike	Canada	Dave only played three games in the NHL for the Montreal Canadiens.
Anderson	Mikey*, Joey*	United States	
Andersson	Mikael, Niklas	Sweden	Both brothers played part of the 1999–2000 season with the New York Islanders but at separate times.
Arbour	Ty, Jack	Canada	
Armstrong	Colby, Riley	Canada	Riley only played two games in the NHL.
Babych	Wayne, Dave	Canada	Both brothers played for the Hartford Whalers in the 1985–86 season.
Barron	Morgan*, Justin*	Canada	
Barrett	Fred, John	Canada	Both brothers played for the Minnesota North Stars.
Bathgate	Frank, **Andy**	Canada	Both brothers played for the New York Rangers.
Bell	Joe, Gordie	Canada	Both brothers played for the New York Rangers.
Benn	Jordie, Jamie*	Canada	Jamie plays for the Dallas Stars, the same team that Jordie played for until his trade to the Montreal Canadiens in 2017. Jordie played over 600 games in the NHL.
Bennett	Curt, Harvey, Bill	United States	Curt and Harvey played together during the 1978–79 season with the St. Louis Blues. Curt was also the first American drafted by an NHL team to play in the league.
Benning	Jim, Brian	Canada	Brian and Jim's father, Elmer, is a scout with the Montreal Canadiens, while Brian's son, Brandon, also works as a scout for the organization.
Benning	Matt*, Mike*	Canada	
Bentley	Reg, Doug, **Max**	Canada	First brothers to play on the same line, for the Chicago Black Hawks. Both brothers assisted Reg's only goal, the first time all three participants in an NHL goal were related.
Berry	Doug, Ken	Canada	Both brothers played for the Edmonton Oilers, though not simultaneously; Doug played for them while the team was in the WHA, while Ken played for the Oilers after they merged into the NHL.
Biega	Alex, Danny	Canada	Both brothers made their NHL debut in 2015.
Biron	Martin, Mathieu	Canada	Both brothers played for the New York Islanders. Mathieu once scored a goal on Martin.
Blair	Chuck, George	Canada	Both brothers played for the Toronto Maple Leafs.
Bordeleau	**Christian**, J.P., Paulin	Canada, France	Christian and J.P. played together in the 1971–72 season with the Chicago Black Hawks.
Boucher	**Georges "Buck"**, Billy, **Frank**, Robert	Canada	Billy and Robert played together for part of the 1923–24 season with the Montreal Canadiens. Buck & Frank also became the first set of brothers to face each other in a Stanley Cup Final (along with Corb & Cy Denneny), when Buck's Ottawa Senators beat Frank's Vancouver Maroons.
Bourcier	Jean, Conrad	Canada	Both brothers played together for the Montreal Canadiens in the 1935–36 season.
Bourque	Chris, Ryan	United States	
Boqvist	**Jesper***, Adam	Sweden	Both brothers signed with the Florida Panthers during the 2024 off-season.
Broderick	Len, Ken	Canada	Len played only a single NHL game.
Brookbank	Wade, Sheldon	Canada	Both brothers played for the Nashville Predators.
Broten	**Neal**, Aaron, Paul	United States	Neal and Aaron played together during the 1989–90 season with the Minnesota North Stars, and have played for the New Jersey Devils, albeit separately. Neal and Paul played together from 1993 to 1995 with the Dallas Stars.
Brown	**Doug**, Greg	United States	Both brothers played together for the Pittsburgh Penguins in the 1993–94 season.
Brownschidle	Jack, Jeff	United States	Both brothers played for the Hartford Whalers.
Bruneteau	**Mud**, Ed	Canada	Both brothers played together for the Detroit Red Wings in the 1940–41, 1943–44, 1944–45, and the 1945–46 seasons.
Bure	Pavel, Valeri	Russia	Both brothers played together in the 2001–02 season with the Florida Panthers. Also won silver medals as representatives of Team Russia at the 1998 Winter Olympics, and bronze medals at the 2002 Winter Olympics.
Busniuk	Ron, Mike	Canada	Ron only played six games in the NHL.
Butsayev	Viacheslav, Yuri	Russia	
Caffery	Jack, Terry	Canada	Jack only played 14 games in the NHL.
Callander	Drew, **Jock**	Canada	
Camazzola	Tony, Jim	Canada	Jim played only three games in the NHL for the Chicago Blackhawks. Tony also played three games in the NHL for the Washington Capitals.
Capuano	Jack, Dave	United States	Both brothers played together for the Vancouver Canucks in the 1990–91 season.
Carlson	Jack, Steve	United States	Inspired the infamous Hanson Brothers of the movie Slap Shot. Steve played one of the brothers, but Jack was unable to act in the film because of the WHA playoffs.
Carrick	Sam*, Trevor	Canada	While they have never played together, both brothers have been together in the Anaheim Ducks organization on several occasions.
Carse	Bill, Bob	Canada	Both brothers played together for the Chicago Black Hawks.
Cates	Noah*, Jackson	United States	Both brothers played for the Philadelphia Flyers in the 2021–22 and 2022–23 seasons.
Cavallini	Gino, Paul	Canada	Both brothers played together from 1987 to 1992 with the St. Louis Blues.
Cherry	Don, Dick	Canada	Don played only one game in the NHL, a playoff game for the Boston Bruins.
Clarke	Brandt*, Graeme	Canada	
Cleghorn	**Sprague**, **Odie**	Canada	Both brothers played together from 1921 to 1925 with the Montreal Canadiens, winning the Stanley Cup together in 1924. The Cleghorns were the first brothers to face each other in the NHL playoffs, playing off in 1919, Odie for Montreal, Sprague for Ottawa.
Cloutier	Sylvain, Dan	Canada	Sylvain only played seven games in the NHL with the Chicago Blackhawks.
Colville	**Neil**, **Mac**	Canada	Both brothers played together from 1935 to 1942 and 1945 to 1947 with the New York Rangers, winning the Stanley Cup together in 1940.
Comrie	Paul, Mike, Eric*	Canada	Paul and Mike played for the Edmonton Oilers. Eric is a half-brother.
Conacher	**Lionel**, **Charlie**, **Roy**	Canada	Lionel and Roy both played for the Chicago Black Hawks. Charlie was Roy's coach with the Chicago Black Hawks.
Cook	**Bill**, **Bun**, Bud	Canada	Bud and Bun both played for the Boston Bruins. Bill and Bun played together from 1926 to 1936 with the New York Rangers, winning the Stanley Cup together in 1928 and 1933 as part of the "Bread Line" with Frank Boucher.
Costello	Les, Murray	Canada	Les only played 20 games in the NHL for the Toronto Maple Leafs.
Courtnall	**Geoff**, Russ	Canada	Both brothers played together for part of the 1994–95 NHL season with the Vancouver Canucks.
Crawford	Bob, **Marc**, Lou	Canada	Lou was the only brother that was not drafted.
Crowder	Bruce, Keith	Canada	Both brothers played together from 1982 to 1984 with the Boston Bruins.
Cullen	Brian, Barry, Ray	Canada	Brian and Ray both played for the New York Rangers. Barry and Ray played for the Detroit Red Wings. Brian and Barry played together from 1955 to 1959 with the Toronto Maple Leafs.
Cullen	**Matt**, Mark	United States	Both brothers played for the Florida Panthers.
Dach	Kirby*, Colton*	Canada	Both brothers played for the Chicago Blackhawks.
Damore	Nick, Hank	Canada	Nick played only one game in the NHL.
Darragh	**Jack**, **Harold**	Canada	
Denneny	**Cy**, **Corbett**	Canada	Became the first set of brothers to face each other in a Stanley Cup Finals (along with Buck and Frank Boucher), when Cy's Ottawa Senators beat Corb's Vancouver Maroons. The Dennenys were the first brothers to face each other in NHL regular season play, on December 22, 1917, in Toronto.
Dillon	Wayne, Gary	Canada	Gary only played 13 games in the NHL for the Colorado Rockies.
Dineen	Peter, Gord, Kevin	Canada, United States	Gord and Kevin both played for the Ottawa Senators.
Dionne	Marcel, **Gilbert**	Canada	
Drury	Ted, **Chris**	United States	Both brothers played for the Calgary Flames.
Dryden	Dave, **Ken**	Canada	On March 20, 1971, Dave and Ken became the first brothers to face each other as goaltenders in an NHL game.
Eaves	Mike, Murray	United States, Canada	
Eklund	William*, Victor*	Sweden	
Eriksson Ek	Joel*, Olle	Sweden	Olle played one game for the Anaheim Ducks in the 2022–23 season.
Esposito	**Phil**, **Tony**	Canada	Both brothers played for the Chicago Black Hawks. Phil scored twice on Tony during Tony's NHL debut on November 3, 1968.
Evans	Paul, Doug, Kevin	Canada	Paul was the only brother who was drafted in the NHL.
Fata	Rico, Drew	Canada	Drew only played eight games in the NHL for the New York Islanders.
Fedorov	**Sergei**, Fedor	Russia	Fedor only played 18 games in the NHL.
Felsner	Denny, Brian	United States	Brian only played 12 games in the NHL for the Chicago Blackhawks. Denny only played 18 games in the NHL for the St. Louis Blues.
Ferraro	Chris, Peter (Twins)	United States	Both brothers played together from 1995 to 1997 with the New York Rangers, in 1997 with the Pittsburgh Penguins, and 2001 with the Washington Capitals.
Fillion	Bob, Marcel	Canada	Marcel played only one game in the NHL.
Finnigan	**Frank**, Eddie	Canada	Both brothers played for the St. Louis Eagles at some point in their careers. Ed only played three games in the NHL.
Fitzgerald	Rusty, Zack	United States	Rusty only played four games in the NHL for the Pittsburgh Penguins. Zack only played one game in the NHL for the Vancouver Canucks.
Fleury	Haydn*, Cale*	Canada	Cale debuted his NHL against Haydn and the Hurricanes on October 3, 2019. Both were selected by the Seattle Kraken in the 2021 NHL Expansion Draft.
Flockhart	Rob, Ron	Canada	
Foligno	Nick*, Marcus*	United States, Canada	Both brothers currently play for the Minnesota Wild.
Foote	**Cal**, Nolan*	United States, Canada	Both brothers were drafted by the Tampa Bay Lightning and played for the New Jersey Devils in the 2023–24 season.
Foudy	Liam*, Jean-Luc	Canada	
Fraser	Archie, Harvey	Canada	Archie only played three games in the NHL for the New York Rangers.
Gardner	Dave, Paul	Canada	Both brothers were drafted in the first round of the NHL Draft. Dave in 1972, and Paul in 1976.
Gassoff	Bob, Brad	Canada	
Gaucher	Jacob*, Nathan*	Canada	
Gaunce	Cameron, Brendan*	Canada	
Geekie	Morgan*, Conor*	Canada	
Gillis	Mike, Paul	Canada	
Gionta	**Brian**, Stephen	United States	Both brothers played for the New Jersey Devils.
Glover	**Fred**, Howie	Canada	Both brothers played for the Chicago Black Hawks and the Detroit Red Wings.
Goc	Sascha, Marcel	Germany	Sascha only played 22 games in the NHL.
Gould	John, Larry	Canada	Both brothers played for the Vancouver Canucks in the 1973–74 season.
Granato	Don, Tony	United States	Don never played in the NHL but served as the head coach of the Buffalo Sabres from 2021 to 2024.
Granlund	Mikael*, Markus	Finland	
Gratton	Gilles, Norm	Canada	Both brothers played for the New York Rangers.
Greig	Bruce, Mark	Canada	Bruce only played nine games in the NHL for the California Golden Seals.
Gretzky	**Wayne**, Keith, Brent	Canada	Wayne played for the Edmonton Oilers from 1979 to 1988; Keith was an interim general manager of the Edmonton Oilers, from January–May 2019. Wayne and Brent are the highest-scoring pair of brothers in NHL history; mainly accredited to Wayne's statistics, as Brent scored one goal and four points.
Guhle	Brendan, Kaiden*	Canada	
Hamel	Jean, Gilles	Canada	
Hamilton	Dougie*, Freddie	Canada	Both brothers played for the Calgary Flames.
Hannigan	Ray, Gord, Pat	Canada	All three played for the Toronto Maple Leafs. Ray only played three games in the NHL for the Maple Leafs.
Hanson	Emil, Oscar	Canada	Emil only played one game in the NHL with the Detroit Red Wings. Oscar only played eight games in the NHL with the Chicago Blackhawks.
Harkins	Todd, Brett	United States	
Hatcher	Kevin, **Derian**	United States	Played together for the Dallas Stars from 1994 to 1996.
Hayes	Jimmy, Kevin	United States	
Hergesheimer	Phil, Wally	Canada	Both brothers played for the Chicago Black Hawks.
Hextall	Bryan, Jr., Dennis	Canada	Both brothers played for the Detroit Red Wings and the Minnesota North Stars in the 1975–76 season and the New York Rangers.
Hicke	**Bill**, Ernie	Canada	Both brothers played for the California Golden Seals in the 1970–71 season.
Hickey	Pat, Greg	Canada	Both brothers played for the New York Rangers.
Hicks	Doug, Glenn	Canada	
Hillman	Floyd, **Larry**, **Wayne**	Canada	Floyd and Larry both played for the Boston Bruins. Larry and Wayne played together during the 1968–69 NHL season for the Minnesota North Stars, and from 1969 to 1971 with the Philadelphia Flyers.
Hirose	Akito, Taro	Canada	
Hoekstra	Cecil, Ed	Canada	Cecil only played four games in the NHL with the Montreal Canadiens in the 1959–60 season.
Holt	Gary, Randy	Canada	Both brothers played for the Cleveland Barons.
Hossa	**Marian**, Marcel	Slovakia	Both brothers played for Slovakia at the 2006 Winter Olympics (coached by their father Frantisek, head coach of Slovak Olympic team in 2006).
Howden	Quinton, **Brett***	Canada	
Howe	**Gordie**, Vic	Canada	
Howe	Marty, **Mark**	Canada, United States	Both brothers played together from 1979 to 1982 with the Hartford Whalers.
Hryckowian	Justin*, Dylan*	Canada	Both played for the Dallas Stars during Dylan's debut in 2026–27
Hughes	Quinn*, Jack*, Luke*	United States	Jack and Luke have played together since 2022 with the New Jersey Devils.
Hughes	Ryan, Kent	Canada	Ryan only played three games in the NHL. Kent never played in the NHL but was hired as the general manager of the Montreal Canadiens in 2022.
Hull	**Bobby**, Dennis	Canada	Both brothers played for the Chicago Black Hawks.
Hunwick	Matt, Shawn	United States	
Hunter	**Dave**, Dale, **Mark**	Canada	Dale and Mark both played for the Washington Capitals.
Hutson	Quinn*, Lane*, Cole*	United States	
Ihnacak	Peter, Miroslav	Slovakia	Both brothers played together from 1985 to 1987 with the Toronto Maple Leafs.
Jackson	**Busher**, **Art**	Canada	Both brothers played for the Toronto Maple Leafs from the 1934–35 to the 1936–37 season. The brothers also played together for the Boston Bruins from the 1941–42 to the 1943–44 season. Both brothers also played for the New York Americans.
Jerwa	Joe, Frank	Canada	Both brothers played for the Boston Bruins.
Jiricek	David*, Adam*	Czech Republic	
Johansen	Ryan, Lucas	Canada	
Johnson	Greg, Ryan	Canada	Both brothers played with the Chicago Blackhawks.
Joliat	Bobby, **Aurele**	Canada	Bobby only played one game in the NHL, with the Montreal Canadiens in the 1924–25 season. Montreal was also where Aurele played his whole career.
Jones	Bob, Jim	Canada	Both brothers only played two games in the NHL. Bob with the New York Rangers, and Jim with the California Golden Seals.
Jones	**Seth***, Caleb*	United States	Both brothers played on the Chicago Blackhawks in the 2021-22 season.
Jonsson	Jorgen, Kenny	Sweden	Won a gold medal together representing Sweden at the 1994 Winter Olympics, and another gold at the 2006 Winter Olympics. Played part of the 1999–00 season together with the New York Islanders.
Joseph	**Mathieu***, Pierre-Olivier*	Canada	Both brothers signed with the St. Louis Blues during the 2024 off-season.
Kaberle	**Frantisek**, **Tomas**	Czech Republic	Both brothers played for the Carolina Hurricanes. Both also brothers won bronze medals as representatives of Czech Republic at the 2006 Winter Olympics.
Kannegiesser	Gordon, Sheldon	Canada	
Kariya	Paul, Steve	Canada	Both brothers won NCAA Division 1 championships with the University of Maine Black Bears (Paul in 1993 and Steve in 1999). Their third brother, Martin, made it to the NCAA championship game in 2002 (also with UMaine) but did not win. Martin would also try out with the St. Louis Blues in 2007 but did not make the final roster for the 2007-08 season.
Kase	Ondrej, David	Czech Republic	
Kempe	Mario, Adrian*	Sweden	
Kilrea	**Hec**, **Wally**, Ken	Canada	Hec and Wally both played together for the Detroit Red Wings from 1936 to 1938; Hec and Wally both played for the Ottawa Senators; Ken also played for the Detroit Red Wings.
King	D.J., **Dwight**	Canada	
Kiprusoff	Marko, Miikka	Finland	
Kitchen	**Mike**, Bill	Canada	
Klingberg	Carl, John	Sweden	
Koivu	Saku, Mikko	Finland	Both brothers won silver medals as representatives of Finland at the 2006 Winter Olympics, another set of silver medals at the 2004 World Cup of Hockey, and bronze in the 2008 Men's World Ice Hockey Championships in Quebec. They are the first European-trained brothers who have both been NHL team captains.
Kordic	**John**, Dan	Canada	
Kostitsyn	Andrei, Sergei	Belarus	First Belarusian siblings to play in the NHL. Both brothers also played together for the Montreal Canadiens and Nashville Predators.
Kronwall	**Niklas**, Staffan	Sweden	
Kyle	Gus, Bill	Canada	Both brothers played for the New York Rangers.
LaForest	Mark, Bob	Canada	Bob only played five games in the NHL.
Langkow	Scott, Daymond	Canada	Both brothers played for the Phoenix Coyotes.
Larmer	**Steve**, Jeff	Canada	Both brothers played together for the Chicago Black Hawks between 1983 and 1986.
Lebeau	**Stephan**, Patrick	Canada	Both brothers played for part of the 1990–91 season together with the Montreal Canadiens.
Leeb	Greg, Brad	Canada	Brad only played five games in the NHL, and Greg only played two.
Lefley	Bryan, **Chuck**	Canada	
Lemieux	Alain, **Mario**	Canada	Played just one game together during the 1986–87 season with the Pittsburgh Penguins.
Lemieux	**Claude**, Jocelyn	Canada	Both brothers played for the Montreal Canadiens from the 1988–89 to the 1989–90 seasons. Both brothers also played for the New Jersey Devils and the Phoenix Coyotes.
Leonard	John*, Ryan*	United States	
Lepine	Hector, **Alfred**	Canada	Both brothers played for the Montreal Canadiens together during the 1925–26 season.
Leswick	**Jack**, Pete, **Tony**	Canada	Jack and Tony both played for the Chicago Black Hawks. Pete only played three games in the NHL.
Lindgren	Charlie*, Ryan*	United States	
Lindros	Eric, Brett	Canada	Both brothers were drafted in the first round. Eric was first overall in 1991 and Brett was ninth overall in 1994.
Linden	Trevor, Jamie	Canada	Jamie only played four games in the NHL.
Loob	Peter, **Hakan**	Sweden	Peter only played eight games in the NHL.
Loughlin	**Clem**, Wilf	Canada	Wilf only played 14 games in the NHL.
Lowrey	Fred, Gerry	Canada	Both brothers played for the Pittsburgh Pirates.
Lundqvist	Henrik, Joel (twins)	Sweden	
MacDermid	Lane, Kurtis*	Canada	
MacMillan	**Bill**, Bob	Canada	Both brothers played for the Atlanta Flames.
Mahovlich	**Frank**, **Peter**	Canada	Both brothers played together from 1967 to 1969 with the Detroit Red Wings, and from 1970 to 1974 with the Montreal Canadiens.
Makar	**Cale***, Taylor*	Canada	Both brothers played for the Colorado Avalanche during the 2025–26 NHL season
Maki	**Chico**, Wayne	Canada	Both brothers played for the Chicago Black Hawks through the 1967–68 and 1968–69 seasons.
Maloney	Dave, Don	Canada	Both brothers played together from 1978 to 1985 with the New York Rangers.
Manery	Randy, Kris	Canada	
Mantha	**Sylvio**, **Georges**	Canada	Both brothers played together from 1928 to 1936 for the Montreal Canadiens, winning the Stanley Cup in 1930 and 1931.
McBain	Jason, Mike	Canada	Jason only played nine games in the NHL.
McCreary	Bill Sr., Keith	Canada	Both brothers played for the Montreal Canadiens.
McGinn	Jamie, Tye, Brock	Canada	Jamie played for the San Jose Sharks, as did Tye. He also played for the Anaheim Ducks, like Brock.
McKegney	Ian, Tony	Canada	Both brothers played for the Chicago Blackhawks at some point in their careers. Ian only played three games in the NHL.
McLeod	Michael, Ryan*	Canada	
McRae	Basil, Chris	Canada	Both brothers played for the Detroit Red Wings and the Toronto Maple Leafs.
Meissner	Dick, Barrie	Canada	Barrie only played six games in the NHL.
Menard	Hillary, Howie	Canada	Both brothers played for the Chicago Black Hawks. However, Hillary only played one game in the NHL.
Messier	Mitch, Joby	Canada	
Messier	Paul, **Mark**	Canada	Paul only played nine games in the NHL.
Metz	**Nick**, **Don**	Canada	Both brothers played together from 1938 to 1948 with the Toronto Maple Leafs, winning the Stanley Cup together in 1945 and 1947.
Michalek	Zbynek, Milan	Czech Republic	
Michaluk	Art, John	Canada	Both brothers played with the Chicago Black Hawks. Art played five games in the NHL, while John only played one game in the NHL.
Micheletti	Joe, Pat	United States	Pat only played 12 games in the NHL.
Middleton	Jacob*, Keaton*	Canada	The two brothers played alongside one another on the San Jose Sharks' AHL affiliate San Jose Barracudas but never on the Sharks.
Miller	Bob, Paul	United States	Paul played his only three NHL games with Bob during the 1981–82 season with the Colorado Rockies.
Miller	Kelly, Kevin, Kip	United States	Kelly and Kevin both played for the New York Rangers. Kevin and Kip both played for the Chicago Blackhawks, New York Islanders and Pittsburgh Penguins. Kelly and Kevin both played together for part of the 1992–93 season with the Washington Capitals. Kip also played for the Capitals.
Miller	Ryan, **Drew**	United States	Drew made his debut with the Anaheim Ducks in the 2007 playoffs; Ryan later played for the Ducks ten years later.
Minard	Mike, Chris	Canada	Both brothers played for the Edmonton Oilers.
Mironov	**Dmitri**, Boris	Russia	Won a silver medal together representing Team Russia at the 1998 Winter Olympics.
Mokosak	Carl, John	Canada	
Moller	Mike, Randy	Canada	Both brothers played for the Buffalo Sabres.
Moore	Steve, Dominic	Canada	Both brothers and their older brother, Mark Moore, played together at Harvard University in the 1999–2000 season. While all three brothers were drafted, only Steve and Dominic played in the NHL.
Morrison	Doug, Mark	Canada	Mark only played ten games in the NHL.
Mullen	**Joe**, Brian	United States	
Mulvey	Grant, Paul	Canada	
Murdoch	Bob, Don	Canada	
Murray	Bryan, Terry	Canada	Terry twice succeeded Bryan in head coaching positions, first with the Washington Capitals, and then the Florida Panthers.
Nash	Brendon, Riley	Canada	
Nelson	Todd, Jeff	Canada	Both brothers played for the Washington Capitals. However, Todd only played three games in the NHL. Todd later coached Jeff with the Muskegon Fury of the United Hockey League.
Niedermayer	**Scott**, **Rob**	Canada	Faced each other in the 2003 Stanley Cup Finals (Scott with the New Jersey Devils and Rob with the Mighty Ducks of Anaheim), the first time brothers faced each other in the finals since 1946. Four years later, the brothers won the Stanley Cup as members of the Anaheim Ducks, the first brothers to do so since Duane and Brent Sutter did it with the Islanders in 1983. Rob later in his career joined the New Jersey Devils, his brother's former team.
Nielsen	Jeff, Kirk	United States	Kirk only played six games in the NHL.
Nolan	Brandon, **Jordan**	Canada	
Norton	Jeff, Brad	United States	Both brothers played together for part of the 2001–02 season with the Florida Panthers.
Nylander	William*, Alexander*	Sweden	Both brothers played together for part of the 2024–25 season with the Toronto Maple Leafs
Odelein	Selmar, **Lyle**	Canada	Selmar only played 18 games in the NHL.
Olofsson	Gustav*, Fredrik	Sweden	
O'Reilly	Cal, **Ryan***	Canada	Both brothers played for the Buffalo Sabres.
O'Shea	Danny, Kevin	Canada	Both brothers played together in the WHA with the Minnesota Fighting Saints. They also played together from the 1971–72 to the 1972–73 seasons with the St. Louis Blues.
Paiement	Rosaire, Wilf	Canada	
Pandolfo	**Jay**, Mike	United States	
Patey	Larry, Doug	Canada	
Patrick	**Lester**, **Frank**	Canada	Lester only played two games in the NHL. Frank was a head coach of the Boston Bruins. Upon Frank's induction into the Hockey Hall of Fame in 1950, they became the first set of brothers inducted.
Patrick	**Lynn**, **Muzz**	Canada	Both brothers played together with the New York Rangers from 1937 to 1946, winning the Stanley Cup in 1940.
Patrick	**Craig**, Glenn	United States	Both brothers played together for part of the 1974–75 season with the California Golden Seals; later worked together in the Pittsburgh Penguins organization where Craig was general manager.
Patrick	Steve, James	Canada	Both played for the Buffalo Sabres. Played together from 1984 to 1986 with the New York Rangers.
Pelech	Matt, Adam*	Canada	Matt only played 13 games in the NHL.
Petrovicky	Robert, Ronald	Slovakia	
Pettinger	**Eric**, **Gord**	Canada	Both brothers played for the Boston Bruins.
Perreault	Jacob, Gabe*	Canada, United States	
Philp	Luke*, Noah	Canada	
Picard	Roger, **Noel**	Canada	Both brothers played for the St. Louis Blues.
Plager	Barclay, Bob, Bill	Canada	Barclay and Bob played together from 1967 to 1977 for the St. Louis Blues; Bill joined them between 1968 and 1972.
Playfair	Larry, Jim	Canada	Both brothers were first-round draft picks; Larry was selected 13th overall by the Buffalo Sabres in 1978, Jim was picked 20th overall by Edmonton in 1982.
Plumb	Ron, Robert	Canada	Robert only played 14 games in the NHL.
Poile	**Bud**, Don	Canada	Both brothers played for the Detroit Red Wings.
Potvin	**Jean**, **Denis**	Canada	Both brothers played together from 1973 to 1978 and 1980 to 1981 with the New York Islanders, winning the Stanley Cup in 1981.
Prentice	Eric, Dean	Canada	Eric is the youngest player to ever play for the Toronto Maple Leafs at age 17 years, 2 months and 8 days.
Primeau	Keith, Wayne	Canada	Once fought each other during a game, when Keith played for the Hartford Whalers and Wayne was with the Buffalo Sabres.
Pronger	Sean, **Chris**	Canada	Both brothers played for the Anaheim Ducks.
Pronovost	**Marcel**, Claude, Jean	Canada	Claude played only three games in the NHL. Andre Pronovost is unrelated but often incorrectly cited as a brother.
Protas	Aliaksei*, Ilya*	Belarus	Ilya made his NHL debut playing on the same line with Aliaksei for the Washington Capitals during the 2025–26 season.
Pyatt	Taylor, Tom	Canada	Taylor played for the Vancouver Canucks and the New York Rangers in his career while Tom played for the AHL affiliates of those teams.
Quackenbush	Bill, Max	Canada	Both brothers played together for the Boston Bruins in the 1950–51 season.
Raddysh	Taylor*, Darren*	Canada	Both brothers played together for the Tampa Bay Lightning in the 2021–22 season.
Radulov	Igor, Alexander	Russia	
Rask	**Tuukka**, Joonas	Finland	Joonas only played two games in the NHL.
Raty	Aku, Aatu*	Finland	As of the 2025-26 season, Aku has only played one game in the NHL.
Rau	Chad, Kyle	United States	Chad only played nine games in the NHL.
Reardon	**Terry**, **Ken**	Canada	Both brothers played together from 1941 to 1943 with the Montreal Canadiens. Later faced each other in the Stanley Cup Finals, where Ken’s Canadiens beat Terry’s Boston Bruins.
Redmond	**Mickey**, Dick	Canada	
Regehr	**Robyn**, Richie	Canada	Both brothers played together for the Calgary Flames. Only NHL brothers to be born in the Southern Hemisphere.
Reinhart	Max, Griffin, **Sam***	Canada	
Richard	**Maurice**, **Henri**	Canada	Both brothers played together for the Montreal Canadiens from 1955 to 1960. Won the Stanley Cup all five years they played together. Henri won the Stanley Cup 11 times, a record for a player; combined with Maurice’s eight, they own the record for most Stanley Cup wins by any combination of brothers.
Richards	Todd, Travis	United States	Travis only played three games in the NHL, and Todd only played eight.
Ritchie	Brett, Nick	Canada	Both brothers played for the Boston Bruins in the 2019–20 season, but never played together in a game. Brett was playing in the minors when Nick was acquired from the Anaheim Ducks on February 24. The Ritchies became the first brothers in NHL history to be traded for each other on March 3, 2023, when Nick was traded from the Arizona Coyotes to the Calgary Flames in exchange for Brett.
Rivers	Shawn, Jamie	Canada	Shawn only played four games in the NHL.
Roberge	**Mario**, Serge	Canada	Serge only played nine games in the NHL.
Roberts	Doug, **Gordie**	United States	Both brothers played for the Boston Bruins.
Robertson	Geordie, Torrie	Canada	Geordie only played five games in the NHL.
Robertson	Nick*, Jason*	United States	
Robinson	Buddy, **Eric***	United States	
Robinson	**Larry**, Moe	Canada	Moe played only one game in the NHL, with Larry, for the Montreal Canadiens.
Roche	Des, Earl	Canada	Both brothers played together for the Montreal Maroons in the 1930–31 and the 1932–33 seasons. The brothers also played together for the Detroit Red Wings in the 1934–35 season. They also played together for the original Ottawa Senators in the 1932–33 and the 1933–34 seasons.
Rolston	Ron, **Brian**	Canada	Ron never played in the NHL, but was the head coach of the Buffalo Sabres from March to November 2013.
Rousseau	Rollie, Guy, **Bobby**	Canada	All three played for the Montreal Canadiens. However, Guy only played four games in the NHL, and Rollie only played two.
Roy	**Patrick**, Stephane	Canada	Stephane only played 12 games in the NHL.
Russell	Kris, Ryan (twins)	Canada	Briefly teammates for the Columbus Blue Jackets in 2011–12; Kris was a draft pick while Ryan was acquired in a trade with Montreal.
Ruutu	Jarkko, **Tuomo**	Finland	
Sacco	Joe, David	United States	Both brothers played together from 1994 to 1996 with the Mighty Ducks of Anaheim; both were also drafted by the Toronto Maple Leafs.
Samuelsson	Philip, Henrik	United States	Both brothers played for the Arizona Coyotes.
Sandin	Linus, Rasmus*	Sweden	
Sauer	Kurt, Michael	United States	Both brothers' careers were cut short due to concussions.
Sauve	Bob, Jean-Francois	Canada	Both brothers played together from 1980 to 1983 with the Buffalo Sabres.
Schaefer	Peter, Nolan	Canada	Nolan only played seven games in the NHL.
Schenn	**Luke***, **Brayden***	Canada	Both brothers played together for the Philadelphia Flyers from 2013–16 and also played for the Los Angeles Kings at one point in their careers. Both were also drafted fifth overall in their respective draft years; Luke in 2008 by the Toronto Maple Leafs, and Brayden in 2009 by the Kings. During the 2012 NHL entry draft, Luke was traded to the Philadelphia Flyers, joining Brayden, who was traded there the year before. Luke was traded to the Kings in January 2016, joining Brayden's first NHL team.
Schmaltz	Jordan, Nick*	United States	
Schmautz	Cliff, Bobby	Canada	
Schmidt	Jack, Otto	Canada	Both brothers played for the Boston Bruins.
Schock	Ron, **Danny**	Canada	Both brothers played for the Boston Bruins.
Sedin	Henrik, Daniel (twins)	Sweden	Both brothers played their entire careers for the Vancouver Canucks, where they were linemates for most of their careers. Both brothers were drafted by Vancouver in 1999, Daniel second overall, and Henrik third. Both brothers won the Art Ross Trophy, Henrik in 2010 and Daniel in 2011. Henrik won the Hart Trophy in 2010, while Daniel won the Ted Lindsay Award in 2011. Both brothers also won gold medals as representatives of Sweden at the 2006 Winter Olympics. Both retired together at the end of the 2017-18 season.
Seiling	Rod, Ric	Canada	
Sestito	Tim, Tom	United States	
Shannon	Darryl, Darrin	Canada	Both brothers played for the Buffalo Sabres. Both played together from 1994 to 1996 with the original Winnipeg Jets.
Sheehy	Timothy, Neil	United States	Both brothers played for the Hartford Whalers.
Sheppard	**Johnny**, Frank	Canada	Both played for the Detroit Red Wings.
Sherwood	Kiefer*, Kole	United States	
Shore	Drew, Nick	United States	
Sillinger	Owen*, Cole*	Canada	Both brothers playing for the Columbus Blue Jackets.
Simon	**Cully**, Thain	Canada	Both brothers played for the Detroit Red Wings. Thain only played three games in the NHL.
Sigalet	Jordan, Jonathan	Canada	Both brothers played one game for the Boston Bruins; they were teammates for the Bruins' minor league affiliate.
Slavin	Jaccob*, Josiah*	United States	Jaccob was selected 120th overall in the 2012 NHL entry draft by the Carolina Hurricanes and serves as Cane's alternate captain. In 2021, he was awarded the Lady Byng Memorial Trophy. Josiah was selected 193rd overall in the 2018 NHL entry draft by the Chicago Blackhawks. Josiah signed with the Hurricanes during the 2024 off-season.
Smith	Brendan*, **Reilly***	Canada	Both brothers played for the Dallas Stars and the New York Rangers.
Smith	Brian, Gary	Canada	Both brothers played for the Minnesota North Stars.
Smith	Gemel, Givani	Canada	The brothers appeared in two games together for the Detroit Red Wings in the 2021-22 season.
Smith	Gord, **Billy**	Canada	Both were drafted in the fifth round and 59th overall. Gord in 1969 by the New York Rangers, and Billy in 1970 by the Los Angeles Kings.
Smith	Kenny, Don	Canada	Both brothers played for the New York Rangers. Don only played ten games in the NHL.
Smyth	Kevin, Ryan	Canada	
Sobchuk	Gene, Dennis	Canada	Gene only played one game in the NHL.
Soderblom	Arvid*, Elmer*	Sweden	
Staal	**Eric**, Marc, **Jordan***, Jared	Canada	Eric won the 2006 Stanley Cup with Carolina and Jordan won in 2009 with Pittsburgh. Both were teammates and also served as team captains of the Hurricanes at one point in their careers. Jared briefly joined Jordan and Eric with the Hurricanes in April 2013. Eric was also teammates with Marc on the New York Rangers in 2016. Later in their careers, Eric and Marc played together for the Florida Panthers in 2022–23.
Stanfield	Jack, Fred, Jim	Canada	Jack and Fred both played for the Chicago Black Hawks in 1965–66 season. However, Jack only played one game in the NHL, it was in the playoffs. Jim only played seven games in the NHL.
Stankiewicz	Ed, Myron	Canada	Ed only played six games in the NHL.
Stastny	Marian, Peter, Anton	Czechoslovakia (now Slovakia)	All three played for the Quebec Nordiques together from 1981 to 1985, only the second time that three brothers played for the same team.
Stastny	Yan, Paul	United States	Sons of Peter Stastny. Both played for the St. Louis Blues.
Stenberg	Otto*, Ivar*	Sweden	Both brothers played for Sweden's World Junior team.
Stevens	**Scott**, Mike	Canada	
Stewart	Anthony, Chris	Canada	
Stone	Michael, **Mark***	Canada	
Strome	Ryan*, Dylan*	Canada	
Stuart	Mike, Mark, Colin	United States	Both Colin and Mark played for the Atlanta Thrashers. Mike only played three games in the NHL.
Subban	P.K., Malcolm	Canada	Their third brother, Jordan, was drafted by Vancouver in 2013 but never played in a regular season NHL game.
Sullivan	Frank, Peter	Canada	Frank only played eight games in the NHL.
Sundstrom	Patrik, Peter (twins)	Sweden	Played part of the 1989–90 season together for the New Jersey Devils.
Sutter	Brian, **Darryl**, **Duane**, **Brent**, Rich, Ron (Rich and Ron are twins)	Canada	Set a record when four of the brothers played in the same game; Duane and Brent with the New York Islanders beat Rich and Ron's Philadelphia Flyers. Brent and Duane won the Stanley Cup twice together with the Islanders in 1982 and 1983. Darryl won the Stanley Cup twice as head coach of the Los Angeles Kings in 2012 and 2014. Rich and Ron were first set of twins to play in the NHL.
Suzuki	Nick*, Ryan*	Canada	
Svechnikov	Evgeny, **Andrei***	Russia	
Sweatt	Lee, Bill	United States	Both played for the Vancouver Canucks.
Tanev	Chris*, Brandon*	Canada	Both players were signed as free agents out of college.
Taylor	**Tim**, Chris	Canada	Played part of the 1998–99 NHL season together for the Boston Bruins.
Teal	Skip, Vic	Canada	Both brothers only played one game in the NHL, Skip with the Boston Bruins and Vic with the New York Islanders.
Thompson	Tage*, Tyce	United States	
Thompson	**Tiny**, **Paul**	Canada	First time in NHL history that one brother scored on another (Paul scored on Tiny on December 21, 1937). Faced each other in the 1929 Stanley Cup Finals, where Tiny’s Boston Bruins beat Paul’s New York Rangers.
Timonen	**Kimmo**, Jussi	Finland	Both brothers played for the Philadelphia Flyers.
Tjarnqvist	Daniel, Mathias	Sweden	
Tkachuk	**Matthew***, Brady*	United States	Both brothers currently play for the Florida Panthers. They also played together for the United States in the 2025 4 Nations Face-Off and the 2026 Winter Olympics.
Toppazzini	Zellio, Jerry	Canada	Both brothers played for the Boston Bruins and the Chicago Black Hawks.
Trottier	**Bryan**, Rocky	Canada	
Turgeon	Sylvain, Pierre	Canada	Both brothers played for the Montreal Canadiens.
van Riemsdyk	James*, **Trevor***	United States	
Vandermeer	Pete, Jim	Canada	Both brothers played for the Phoenix Coyotes.
Vopat	Jan, Roman	Czech Republic	Both brothers played together for parts of the 1996–97 and 1997–98 seasons with the Los Angeles Kings.
Warsofsky	Ryan, David	United States	Ryan never played in the NHL, but is the current head coach of the San Jose Sharks.
Warwick	Grant, Bill	Canada	Both brothers played together from 1941 to 1943 with the New York Rangers.
Watson	**Joe**, **Jimmy**	Canada	Both brothers played together from 1973 to 1978 with the Philadelphia Flyers, winning the Stanley Cup in 1974 and 1975.
Wellwood	Kyle, Eric	Canada	
Wesley	Blake, **Glen**	Canada	Both brothers played for the Hartford Whalers and the Toronto Maple Leafs.
Williams	Fred, Gord	Canada	Gord only played two games in the NHL.
Williams	Tom, Butch	United States	Both brothers played for the California Golden Seals.
Wilson	**Johnny**, **Larry**	Canada	Both brothers played together in the Detroit Red Wings system from 1949 to 1953, and for part of the 1955–56 season with the Chicago Blackhawks.
Wilson	**Murray**, Doug	Canada	
Wotherspoon	Tyler, Parker*	Canada	
Xhekaj	Arber*, Florian*	Canada	Both brothers played for the Montreal Canadiens during the 2025–26 season.
Yaremchuk	Gary, Ken	Canada	Both brothers played for the Toronto Maple Leafs.
Zalewski	Steven, Mike	United States	

== Parent-children ==
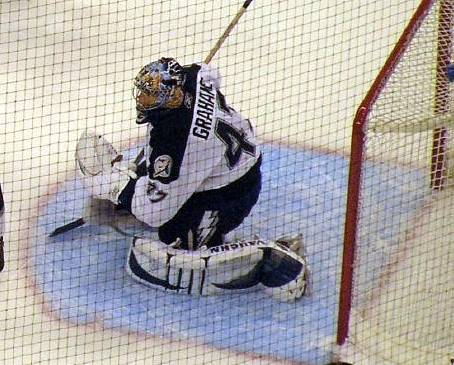
John Grahame has two unique familial connections: he played goal for the same team (Boston) as his father Ron, and his mother (Charlotte) also won the Stanley Cup as an executive with the Colorado Avalanche.

Last name	Parent	Children	Country	Notes:
Abel	**Sid**	Gerry	Canada, United States	Gerry played one game in the NHL, doing so under his father who was head coach of the Detroit Red Wings.
Acton	**Keith**	Will	Canada	Both Keith and Will have played for the Edmonton Oilers.
Adam	Russ	Luke	Canada	Russ played eight games in the NHL.
Andersson	Niklas	Lias	Sweden	
Andersson	Peter	Rasmus*	Sweden	
Apps	**Syl**	Syl Jr.	Canada	
Archibald	Jim	**Josh**	Canada, United States	Jim only played 16 NHL games.
Arnason	Chuck	Tyler	Canada, United States	
Ashton	Brent	Carter	Canada	
Attwell	Ron	Bob	Canada, United States	Both Ron and Bob played 22 games in the NHL. Each of them also only recorded one goal.
Barber	Don	Riley	Canada, United States	
Bassen	Hank	Bob	Canada	Both played for the Chicago Black Hawks.
Barrie	Len	Tyson	Canada	
Beaudoin	Eric	Cole*	Canada	
Bellows	**Brian**	Kieffer	Canada, United States	
Bennett	Harvey, Sr.	Curt, Harvey Jr., Bill	Canada, United States	Harvey Sr. and Bill both played for the Boston Bruins.
Benning	Brian	Matt*, Mike*	Canada	Matt played for the Edmonton Oilers, the team for which his father played. Mike plays currently for the Florida Panthers, where Brian also played.
Blake	Jason	**Jackson***	United States	
Boileau	Rene	Marc	Canada	René only played seven games in the NHL.
Bonk	Radek	Oliver	Czech Republic, Canada	-
Bordeleau	Paulin	Sebastien	Canada, France	Both played only five Stanley Cup playoff games.
Bordeleau	Sebastien	Thomas*	France, United States	
Bouchard	**Emile "Butch"**	**Pierre**	Canada	Both won the Stanley Cup with the Montreal Canadiens.
Boucher	Brian	Tyler*	United States	
Bourque	**Ray**	Chris, Ryan	Canada, United States	Chris played briefly for the Bruins, with whom his father Ray spent the majority of his career.
Bowman	**Scotty**	**Stan**	Canada	Both have worked under the Chicago Blackhawks organization.
Brind'Amour	**Rod**	Skyler*	Canada, United States	Skyler plays for the Carolina Hurricanes, the same team his father played and coached for.
Brown	**Adam**	Andy	Canada	Both played for the Detroit Red Wings.
Brown	**Doug**	Patrick	United States	
Brown	Jeff	Logan	Canada, United States	
Bubla/Slegr	Jiri	**Jiri**	Czech Republic	They both played for the Vancouver Canucks. They both won the IIHF World Hockey Championship Gold Medals. Jiri the son uses his step-father's surname, Slegr.
Buchanan	Ralph	Ron	Canada	Ralph only played two games in the NHL, and Ron only played five.
Burakovsky	Robert	**Andre***	Sweden	
Byram	Shawn	**Bowen***	Canada	Shawn only played five games in the NHL.
Campbell	**Colin**	**Gregory**	Canada	
Carr	Al	Gene	Canada	Al only played five games in the NHL.
Chelios	**Chris**	Jake	United States	Both played for the Detroit Red Wings.
Chorney	Marc	Taylor	Canada, United States	
Chouinard	Guy	Eric	Canada	
Chychrun	**Jeff**	Jakob*	Canada	
Clancy	**King**	Terry	Canada	Both played for the Toronto Maple Leafs.
Colley	Tom	Kevin	Canada	Tom played only one game in the NHL.
Conacher	**Charlie**	Pete	Canada	Both played for the Toronto Maple Leafs.
Conacher	**Lionel**	**Brian**	Canada	
Cote	Alain	Jean-Philippe	Canada	Jean-Philippe only played eight games in the NHL, all with the Montreal Canadiens.
Couturier	Sylvain	Sean*	Canada	
Creighton	Dave	Adam	Canada	Both played for the Chicago Blackhawks.
Crombeen	Mike	B.J.	Canada	Both played for the St. Louis Blues.
Crozier	Joe	Greg	Canada	Greg played only one game in the NHL.
Cullen	Barry	John	Canada	Both played for the Toronto Maple Leafs.
Dahlen	Ulf	Jonathan	Sweden	Both played for the San Jose Sharks.
DeBrusk	Louie	Jake*	Canada	
DeFazio	Dean	Brandon	Canada	
DeMarco	Ab, Sr.	Ab, Jr.	Canada	Both played for the Boston Bruins and New York Rangers.
Dineen	**Bill**	Peter, Gord, Kevin	Canada	Bill was Kevin's coach with the Philadelphia Flyers.
Djoos	Par	**Christian**	Sweden	
Doan	Shane	Josh*	Canada, United States	Josh was drafted by and played for the Arizona Coyotes, the same organization who drafted and employed his father for his entire career.
Domi	Tie	Max*	Canada	Both played for the Toronto Maple Leafs.
Donato	Ted	Ryan*	United States	Ryan played for the Boston Bruins, with whom his father played.
Donovan	Shean	Jorian*	Canada	Jorian plays for the Ottawa Senators, the same team for whom his father played.
Drury	Ted	Jack*	United States	Ted played for the Hartford Whalers while Jack played for the Whalers' successor Carolina Hurricanes.
Dube	Norm	Christian	Canada	
Duchesne	Gaetan	Jeremy	Canada, United States	
Eaves	Mike	Patrick	United States	
Erixon	Jan	Tim	Sweden	Tim played for the New York Rangers, with whom his father played.
Ferguson	**John Sr.**	John Jr.	Canada	John Sr. played for the Montreal Canadiens, and John Jr. was drafted by Montreal but never played in the NHL. John Jr. served as general manager of the Toronto Maple Leafs.
Ferguson	Norm	Craig	Canada	
Ferraro	Ray	Landon	Canada	
Finley	Jeff	Jack*	Canada	
Fitzgerald	Tom	Casey*	United States	
Fletcher	**Cliff**	**Chuck**	Canada	Cliff won the Stanley Cup in 1989 as general manager of the Calgary Flames; after having been a part of three finalist teams, Chuck finally did the same 20 years later as assistant general manager of the Pittsburgh Penguins in 2009.
Fogolin	**Lee Sr.**	**Lee Jr.**	Canada, United States	
Foligno	Mike	Nick*, Marcus*	Canada, United States	Both Mike and Marcus played for the Buffalo Sabres, while Mike and Nick both played for the Toronto Maple Leafs.
Foote	**Adam**	Cal, Nolan*	Canada, United States	
Foster	Dwight	Alex	Canada, United States	Alex only played three games in the NHL.
Francis	Emile	Bobby	Canada, United States	
Gagner	Dave	Sam	Canada	
Gainey	**Bob**	Steve	Canada	Steve was drafted by his father, who was general manager of the Dallas Stars.
Gardner	**Cal**	Dave, Paul	Canada	Cal and Paul both played for the Toronto Maple Leafs.
Gauthier	Sean	Cutter*	Canada, United States	
Geoffrion	**Bernie**	Dan	Canada	All generations played for the Montreal Canadiens. Bernie also coached Dan for one season with the Canadiens.
Geoffrion	Dan	Blake	Canada, United States	All generations played for the Montreal Canadiens. Bernie also coached Dan for one season with the Canadiens.
Goldup	**Hank**	Glenn	Canada	
Grahame	Ron and **Charlotte**	**John**	Canada, United States	Ron and John are the only father-son goalie combination to play for the same team, the Boston Bruins. On February 4, 2006, John faced Brent Johnson, the first time two-second generation goaltenders faced each other in an NHL game.
Greig	Mark	Ridly*	Canada	
Gruden	John	Jonathan*	United States	
Hajt	Bill	Chris	Canada, United States	Chris only played six games in the NHL.
Hagman	Matti	Niklas	Finland	First Finnish father-son pair in NHL history. They both have seven points in their NHL playoff careers.
Hampson	Ted	Gord	Canada	Gord only played four games in the NHL.
Hanson	David	Christian	United States	
Harkins	Todd	Jansen*	United States, Canada	
Haworth	Gordie	Alan	Canada	Gordie only played two games in the NHL.
Helenius	Sami	Samuel*	Finland	
Hextall	**Bryan**	Bryan, Jr., Dennis	Canada	All three played for the New York Rangers.
Hextall	Bryan, Jr.	Ron	Canada	
Hicks	**Wayne**	Alex	Canada	Both played for the Pittsburgh Penguins.
Hodge	**Ken**	Ken, Jr.	Canada, United States	Both played for the Boston Bruins; became first father-son duo to score a hat-trick for the same team.
Holloway	Bruce	Dylan*	Canada	
Holmes	Louis	Chuck	Canada	
Howe	**Gordie**	**Mark**, Marty	Canada, United States	All three played together during the 1979–80 NHL season with the Hartford Whalers, the only such time in NHL history that a father and his sons were active at the same time.
Hull	**Bobby**	**Brett**	Canada, United States	Both played for the Winnipeg Jets/Phoenix Coyotes franchise; Brett wore his father’s retired number 9 when he joined the Coyotes. Only father-son combination to each win the Hart Memorial Trophy for league MVP.
Imlach	**Punch**	Brent	Canada	Brent played only three NHL games, all with the Toronto Maple Leafs. Brent's father Punch served as head coach during his brief playing career.
Ingarfield	Earl, Sr.	Earl, Jr.	Canada	
Jarventie	Martti	Roby	Finland	
Johansen	Bill	Trevor	Canada	Both played for the Toronto Maple Leafs.
Johansson	Roger	Albert*	Sweden	
Johnson	**Bob**	Mark	United States	Mark played for the Pittsburgh Penguins, where his father later coached the team to the franchise's first Stanley Cup championship, in 1991.
Johnson	Bob	Brent	United States	Both played for the St. Louis Blues and Pittsburgh Penguins. On February 4, 2006, Brent faced John Grahame, the first time two second-generation goaltenders faced each other in an NHL game.
Johnson	Craig	Ryan*	United States	
Jones	Brad	Max*	United States	
Kapanen	Sami	Kasperi*	Finland	
Kastelic	Ed	Mark*	Canada, United States	
Kearns	Dennis	Bracken	Canada	
Knuble	Mike	Cole*	United States, Canada	Cole plays for the Philadelphia Flyers, the same team Mike played for.
Kovalenko	Andrei	Nikolai	Russia	Both played for the Colorado Avalanche.
Kromm	Bobby	Richard	Canada	Bobby was head coach for the Detroit Red Wings.
Kuntar	Les	Trevor*	United States	
Lachance	Scott	Shane*	United States	
Lacroix	**Pierre**	Eric	Canada	
Lafreniere	Roger	Jason	Canada	Roger only played thirteen games in the NHL.
Laperriere	**Jacques**	Daniel	Canada	
Lappin	Peter	Nick	United States	
Larose	**Claude**	Guy	Canada	
Leach	**Reggie**	**Jamie**	Canada	
Lemieux	**Claude**	Brendan	Canada	
Leschyshyn	**Curtis**	Jake	Canada	
Lindholm	Mikael	Elias*	Sweden	
Lindsay	Bert	**Ted**	Canada	Bert only played 20 games in the NHL.
LoPresti	Sam	Pete	United States	First father-son goaltending combination.
Lowe	**Kevin**	Keegan	Canada	Both played for the Edmonton Oilers.
Lowry	Dave	Adam*	Canada	In 2020, Dave was hired as an assistant coach of the Winnipeg Jets, for whom his son Adam played. Dave later became interim head coach in 2021.
Ludvig	Jan	John	Czech Republic, Canada	
Lukowich	Bernie	**Brad**	Canada	
MacDermid	Paul	Lane, Kurtis*	Canada	Paul and Lane are one of only two father-son pairs to score their first NHL goal on the same date.
MacInnis	**Al**	Ryan	Canada, United States	
Mackell	**Jack**	**Fleming**	Canada	
Mackey	David	Connor*	Canada, United States	David played for the Chicago Blackhawks while Connor plays for their AHL affiliate, the Rockford Icehogs.
MacLean	**John**	Kyle*	Canada, United States	Kyle played for the New York Islanders at the same time John served as an assistant coach.
Malone	Greg	Ryan	Canada, United States	Both played for the Pittsburgh Penguins. They became the second father-son duo to score a hat trick for the same team.
Manson	Dave	**Josh***	Canada	
Marchment	Bryan	Mason*	Canada	Mason and Bryan have both played for the Toronto Maple Leafs for one season. As of July 2026, Mason plays for the San Jose Sharks, with whom Bryan played for six seasons.
Matteau	**Stephane**	Stefan	Canada, United States	
McBain	Andrew	Jack*	Canada	Jack played for the Winnipeg Jets/Arizona Coyotes, the same franchise with whom his father also played.
McCreary	Bill, Sr.	Bill, Jr.	Canada, United States	Bill Jr. only played twelve games in the NHL.
McDonald	Gerry	Colin	United States	
McMahon	**Mike, Sr.**	Mike, Jr.	Canada	
McNab	**Max**	Peter	Canada, United States	
McRae	Basil	Philip	Canada, United States	Both played for the St. Louis Blues.
McTavish	Dale	Mason*	Canada	Dale played nine games in the NHL for the Calgary Flames.
Meloche	**Gilles**	Eric	Canada	Both played for the Pittsburgh Penguins.
Mikkelson	Bill	Brendan	Canada	
Mitchell	Jeff	Travis*	United States	
Morrison	Jim	Dave	Canada	
Murphy	Gord	Connor*	Canada, United States	
Murray	Andy	Brady	Canada, United States	
Musil	Frank	David	Czech Republic	David and Frank both played for the Edmonton Oilers.
Namestnikov	Evgeny	Vladislav*	Russia	Both have also appeared in the AHL for the Syracuse Crunch. Vladislav made his NHL debut with the Tampa Bay Lightning in 2014.
Nilsson	**Kent**	Robert	Sweden	Both played for the Edmonton Oilers.
Nolan	Ted	Brandon, **Jordan**	Canada	Ted was an assistant coach for the Hartford Whalers and later on head coach of the Buffalo Sabres. Brandon played for the former Whalers franchise in Carolina. Jordan played for the Sabres.
Norris	Dwayne	Josh*	Canada, United States	Dwayne only played 20 games in the NHL.
Nylander	Michael	William*, Alexander*	Sweden	William's first NHL goal was assisted by the Brooks Laich, the same player who assisted on Michael's last NHL goal.
Nystrom	**Bob**	Eric	Canada, United States	
O'Connor	Myles	**Logan***	Canada	
O'Flaherty	Peanuts	Gerry	Canada, United States	
O'Regan	Tom	Danny	United States	
Olsen	Darryl	Dylan	Canada	
Palazzari	Aldo	Doug	United States	
Parise	J.P.	Zach	Canada, United States	Both played for the New York Islanders.
Parssinen	Timo	Juuso*	Finland	Timo played 17 games for the Mighty Ducks of Anaheim during the 2001-02 season, Juuso currently plays for the New York Rangers.
Patrick	**Lester**	**Lynn**, **Muzz**	Canada	Lester was general manager of the New York Rangers when Lynn and Muzz won the Stanley Cup in 1940. Muzz would later go on to serve as general manager.
Patrick	**Lynn**	**Craig**, Glenn	Canada, United States	Craig was general manager of the New York Rangers, becoming the third generation of his family to run the franchise (following grandfather Lester and father Lynn). Lynn also coached Craig with the St. Louis Blues.
Patrick	Steve	Nolan	Canada	
Pearson	Scott	Chase	Canada, United States	
Perlini	Fred	Brendan	Canada	
Perreault	Yanic	Jacob, Gabe*	Canada, United States	
Peters	**Jimmy, Sr.**	Jimmy, Jr.	Canada	Both played for the Detroit Red Wings.
Pilon	Rich	Garrett*	Canada, United States	
Pitlick	Lance	Rem	United States	
Plante	Cam	Alex	Canada	Cam only played two games in the NHL, while Alex has only played seven.
Poile	**Bud**	David	Canada	David most recently served as the executive vice president of hockey operations and general manager of the Nashville Predators until his retirement in 2024.
Poulin	Patrick	Sam*	Canada	
Pratt	**Babe**	Tracy	Canada	Both played for the Toronto Maple Leafs.
Primeau	Keith	Cayden*	Canada, United States	
Pyatt	Nelson	Taylor, Tom	Canada	
Raglan	Clare "Rags"	Herb	Canada	
Ramage	**Rob**	John	Canada, United States	Rob and John both played for the Calgary Flames; Rob won the Stanley Cup with Calgary in 1989 while his son John made his debut with the team in 2015.
Reinhart	Paul	Max, Griffin, **Sam***	Canada	
Reise	Leo	**Leo Jr.**	Canada	First father-son combination to play in the NHL; both played for the New York Rangers.
Richards	Todd	Justin	United States	
Richmond	Steve	Danny	United States	
Riggin	Dennis	Pat	Canada	Dennis only played 18 games in the NHL.
Roberts	Doug	David	United States	
Robidas	Stephane	Justin*	Canada	
Robinson	Doug	Rob	Canada	
Rychel	**Warren**	Kerby	Canada	
Rymsha	Andy	Drake	Canada, United States	
Samuelsson	**Kjell**	Mattias*	Sweden, United States	
Samuelsson	**Ulf**	Philip, Henrik	Sweden, United States	Both Ulf and Philip played for the Pittsburgh Penguins.
Sanderson	Geoff	Jake*	Canada, United States	
Sauve	Bob	Philippe	Canada, United States	
Sauve	Jean-Francois	Maxime	Canada	
Sexton	Randy	Ben	Canada	Ben is the assistant coach for the Ottawa Senators, for whom his father was a general manager.
Shero	**Fred**	**Ray**	Canada, United States	Fred was the head coach of the Philadelphia Flyers' first and second Stanley Cup-winning teams in 1974 and 1975; Ray was general manager of the Pittsburgh Penguins' third in 2009.
Sillinger	Mike	Owen*, Cole*	Canada	Both Owen and Cole are currently playing for the Columbus Blue Jackets, the same team their father played.
Simpson	**Craig**	Dillon	Canada	Dillon and Craig both played for the Edmonton Oilers.
Smedsmo/Byfuglien	Dale	**Dustin**	United States	Dale is Dustin's stepfather. Dustin goes by his mother's birthname, Byfuglien.
Smith	Derrick	Dalton	Canada	
Smith	**Des**	Brian, Gary	Canada	Des and Gary both played with the Chicago Black Hawks.
Smith	Stuart	Brian	Canada	Stuart only played 17 games in the NHL.
Smrke	Stan	John	Canada, United States	Stan only played nine games in the NHL.
Snuggerud	Dave	Jimmy*	United States	
Spring	Frank	Corey	Canada	Corey only played 16 games in the NHL.
Stapleton	Pat	Mike	Canada	Both played for the Chicago Blackhawks.
Stastny	Peter	Yan, Paul	Slovakia, United States	All three played for the St. Louis Blues at different times.
Stauber	Robb	Jaxson	United States	Both players are goaltenders.
Steen	Thomas	**Alexander**	Sweden	
Stephenson	Bob	Shay	Canada	Bob only played eighteen games in the NHL, and Shay only played two.
Stienburg	Trevor	Matthew*	Canada	Matthew plays for the Colorado Avalanche, the same franchise for which his father played when it was the Quebec Nordiques.
Stillman	**Cory**	Riley*	Canada	Riley plays for the Florida Panthers, with whom his father played.
Sutter	**Brent**	Brandon	Canada	Brandon played for the Vancouver Canucks, with whom his uncle, Rich Sutter, played.
Sutter	**Darryl**	Brett	Canada	Brett made his debut with the Calgary Flames while his father was serving as the team's general manager.
Sutter	**Duane**	Brody	Canada	
Tambellini	**Steve**	Jeff	Canada	Jeff played for the Vancouver Canucks, for whom his father was the assistant general manager until April 2008. Both played for the New York Islanders.
Taylor	**Billy, Sr.**	Billy, Jr.	Canada	Both played two games for the New York Rangers.
Thomas	Steve	Christian	Canada	
Thompson	Brent	Tage*, Tyce*	Canada, United States	
Tinordi	Mark	Jarred	Canada, United States	Both played two games for the New York Rangers.
Tkachuk	Keith	**Matthew***, Brady*	United States	
Turcotte	Alfie	Alex*	United States	
Turgeon	Pierre	Dominic	Canada, United States	
Turnbull	**Perry**	Travis	Canada, United States	
Vachon	**Rogie**	Nicholas	Canada	Nick played only one game in the NHL.
Vesey	Jim	Jimmy	United States	
Walsh	Mike	Reilly	United States	
Walter	**Ryan**	Ben	Canada	
Walton	Bob	**Mike**	Canada	Bob only played four games in the NHL.
Ward	Dixon	Taylor*	Canada	Taylor plays for the Los Angeles Kings, the same team his father played for.
Ward	Don	Joe	Canada	Joe only played four games in the NHL.
Wilson	Jerry	Carey	Canada	Jerry only played three games in the NHL.
Wilson	Carey	Colin	Canada, United States	
Wilson	**Larry**	Ron	Canada, United States	
Wilson	**Rick**	Landon	Canada, United States	
Wolanin	**Craig**	Christian*	United States	
Wood	Randy	Miles*	United States	
Ylonen	Juha	Jesse	Finland	

== Grandfather-grandsons ==
This category is for such pairings not already listed in the "Parent-Children" section above (i.e., maternal grandparents): grandfathers Paulin Bordeleau, Bernie Geoffrion, Bryan Hextall, Lester Patrick, Jerry Wilson.

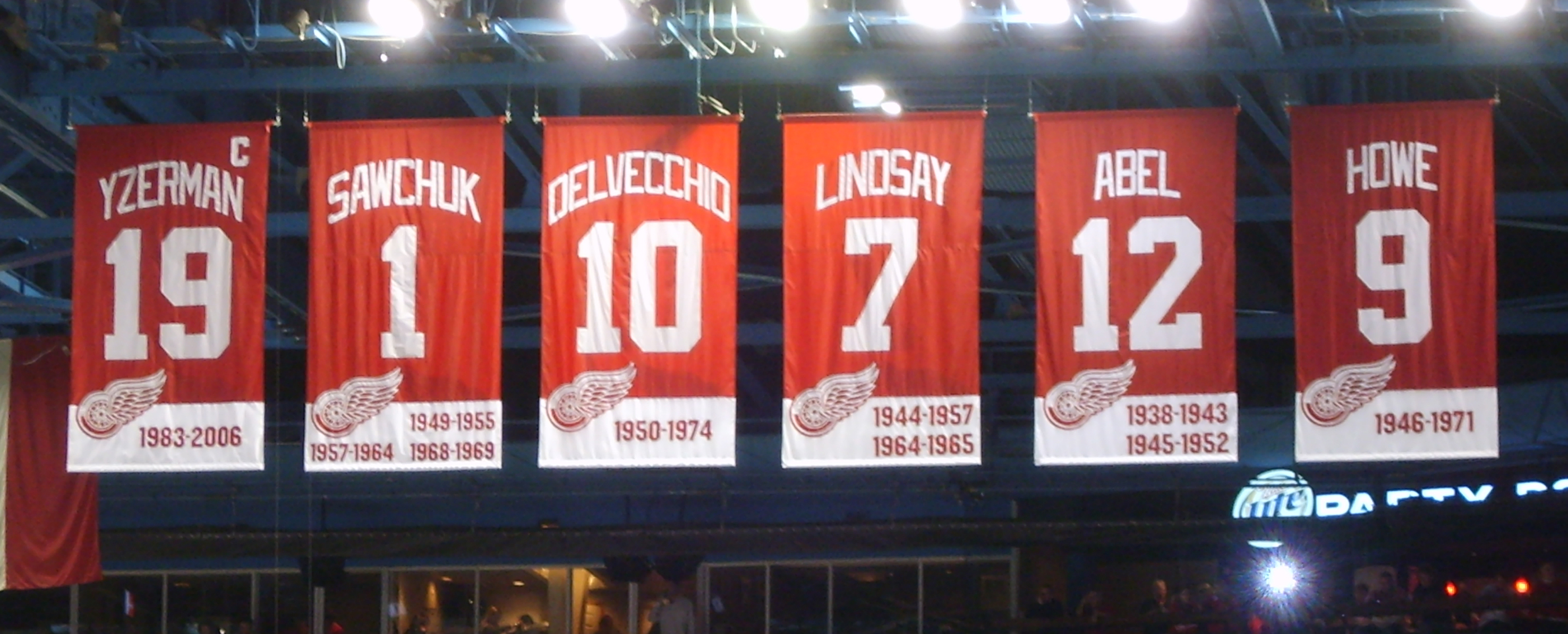
Brent Johnson is the grandson of former Detroit Red Wings player Sid Abel, whose jersey (number 12) is shown here.

Grandfather	Grandson	Country	Notes
**Sid Abel**	Brent Johnson	Canada	
**Bobby Baun**	Kyle Baun	Canada	
Steve Cardwell	Ethan Cardwell*	Canada	
**Dit Clapper**	Greg Theberge	Canada	
Barry Cullen	**Matt Cullen**, Mark Cullen, & Logan Morrison*	Canada, United States	
**Glenn Hall**	Grant Stevenson	Canada	
Lou Jankowski	Mark Jankowski*	Canada	
Randy Legge	Denver Barkey*	Canada	
**Howie Morenz**	Dan Geoffrion	Canada	Both played for the Montreal Canadiens.
Lou Nanne	Vinni Lettieri*	United States	
**Andre Pronovost**	Anthony Mantha*	Canada	Mantha played for the Detroit Red Wings, the same team that his grandfather played for.
Bud Stefanski	Riley Stillman*	Canada	
Pat Stapleton	Mark Kastelic*	Canada, United States	
**Bill Stewart**	Paul Stewart	United States	Both were on-ice officials in the NHL. Bill also coached the Chicago Black Hawks to the 1938 Stanley Cup, and Paul played 21 games with the Quebec Nordiques.

== Great-grandfather & great-grandson ==
Great-grandfather	Great-grandson	Country	Notes
**Howie Morenz**	Blake Geoffrion	Canada, United States	Blake became the first fourth-generation player in the league. All four generations have played for the Montreal Canadiens.
**Lester Patrick**	Chris Patrick	Canada, United States	Chris is the general manager of the Washington Capitals.

== Uncles-nephews ==
This category is for such pairings not already listed in the "Father-Son" & "Siblings" sections above.

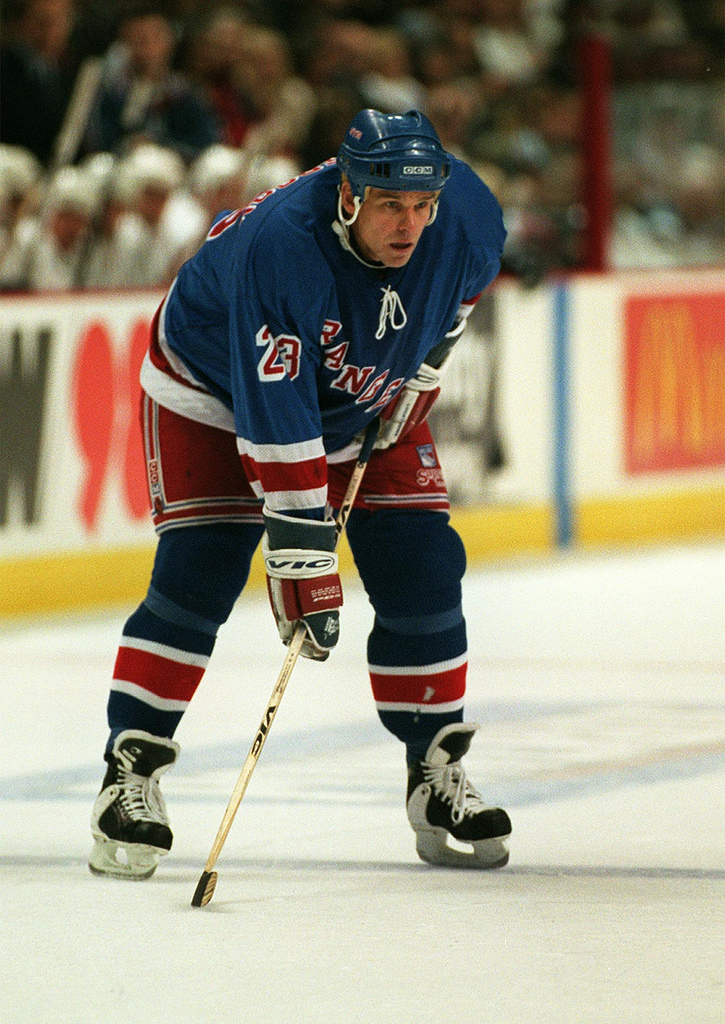
Jeff Beukeboom, pictured here with the New York Rangers, is the nephew of Ed Kea and cousin of Joe Nieuwendyk.

Uncle	Nephew	Country	Notes
Earl Anderson	Wyatt Kaiser*	United States	
**George Armstrong**	Dale McCourt	Canada	
Scott Arniel	Jamie Arniel	Canada	Both played for the Boston Bruins.
Todd Bertuzzi	Tyler Bertuzzi*	Canada	Tyler played for the Detroit Red Wings, the same team as his uncle played.
Scott Bjugstad	Nick Bjugstad*	United States	
**Toe Blake**	Mike Blake	Canada	
**Johnny Boychuk**	John Quenneville	Canada	Johnny is John's uncle by marriage.
Brian Bradley	Jack LaFontaine	Canada	
Andy Brickley	Connor Brickley	United States	
**Neal**, Aaron, Paul Broten	**Shane Gersich**	United States	
**Johnny Bucyk**	Randy Bucyk	Canada	
**Billy Carroll**	Boone Jenner*	Canada	
Guy Chouinard	Marc Chouinard	Canada	
Dave Christian	Brock Nelson*	United States	
**Lionel**, **Charlie**, & **Roy Conacher**	Murray Henderson	Canada	Murray and Roy both played for the Boston Bruins.
John Cullen	**Matt Cullen**, Mark Cullen, & Logan Morrison*	United States, Canada	
Marty Dallman	Kevin Dallman	Canada	
Billy Dea	James Wisniewski	Canada, United States	Both played for the Chicago Blackhawks.
Barry Dean	Zack Smith	Canada	
Chris Drury	Jack Drury*	United States	Both played for the Colorado Avalanche.
Dave Dunn	Brett Clark	Canada	
**Roy Edwards**	Don Edwards	Canada	
**Bo Elik**	Todd Elik	Canada	
Randy Exelby	Kyle Capobianco*	Canada	
Denis Gauthier	Julien Gauthier	Canada	
**Jean-Sebastien Giguere**	Alexandre Fortin	Canada	
**Clark Gillies**	Colton Gillies	Canada	
Mike Gillis	Matt & Adam* Pelech	Canada	
Jeff Hackett	Matt Hackett	Canada	Both are goaltenders.
Floyd, **Larry**, & **Wayne** Hillman	Brian Savage	Canada	Brian played for the Montreal Canadiens, where Larry previously played, and the Philadelphia Flyers, who both Larry and Wayne played for.
**Bobby Holik**	David Musil	Czech Republic	
Wes Jarvis	Alex Foster	Canada, United States	Foster played for the Toronto Maple Leafs, the same team as his uncle played.
David Jensen	Joe Jensen	United States	
Steve Jensen	Nick Jensen*	United States	
Mike Johnston	Ryan Johnston	Canada	Mike never played in the NHL, but was the head coach of the Pittsburgh Penguins from June 2014 to December 2015. Ryan's sister (and Mike's niece) Rebecca is a member of the Canada women's national ice hockey team and a two-time Olympic gold winner.
Sami Kapanen	Oliver Kapanen*	Finland	
Ed Kea	**Jeff Beukeboom** & **Joe Nieuwendyk**	Canada	
Dan Kesa	**Milan Lucic**	Canada	
**Hec**, **Wally** & Ken Kilrea	Brian Kilrea	Canada	
**Vyacheslav Kozlov** & Ivan Novoseltsev	Vladislav Namestnikov*	Russia	
**Lane Lambert**	Brad Lambert*	Canada, Finland	
Steve Leach	Jay Leach	United States	Both played for the Boston Bruins.
**Jacques Lemaire**	Manny Fernandez	Canada	While Fernandez played for the Minnesota Wild, Lemaire was his coach.
Mikael Lindholm	Calle Jarnkrok	Sweden	
**Joe Malone**	Cliff Malone	Canada	Both played for the Montreal Canadiens
**Greg Malone**	Brad Malone	Canada	
Bill Sr. & Keith McCreary	Ron Attwell	Canada	Bill and Ron both played for the New York Rangers and the St. Louis Blues.
Jim McFadden	Bill Mikkelson	Canada	
**Earl Miller**	**Bill Hay**	Canada	Both played for the Chicago Blackhawks. Bill was inducted into the Hockey Hall of Fame as a builder, as was his father, Charles.
Sergio Momesso	Marco Scandella	Canada	Both played for the St. Louis Blues.
Scott Morrow	Scott Morrow*	United States	
Mike Murphy	Julian Melchiori	Canada	
Bryan & Terry Murray	Tim Murray	Canada	
Dennis O'Brien	Shane O'Brien	Canada	
Peanuts O'Flaherty	**Craig Muni**	Canada	
**Jimmy Peters, Sr.**	Glen Currie	Canada	
Lance Pitlick	Tyler Pitlick	United States	
**Didier Pitre**	Vic Desjardins	Canada, United States	Pitre was elected to the Hockey Hall of Fame in 1962, Desjardins was elected to the United States Hockey Hall of Fame in 1974.
**Bill Ranford**	Brendan Ranford	Canada	
Marcus Ragnarsson	Gustav Lindstrom	Sweden	
Robert Reichel	Lukas Reichel*	Czech Republic, Germany	
Travis Richards	Justin Richards	United States	
Luke Richardson	Jakob Chychrun*	Canada	
**Steve Rooney**	Kevin Rooney*	United States	Kevin plays for the New Jersey Devils, the same team as his uncle played.
Bob Sauve	Maxime Sauve	Canada	
Jean-Francois Sauve	Philippe Sauve	Canada, United States	
Enio Sclisizzi	**John Tonelli**	Canada	John Tonelli's brother Ray also played in the IHL and USHL. John and Ray Tonelli's mother is Joy Sclisizzi, who is related to NHLer Enio Sclisizzi.
Mike Stapleton	Mark Kastelic*	Canada, United States	
Bob Stephenson	**Chandler Stephenson***	Canada	
**Gary Suter**	Ryan Suter	United States	Gary's brother and Ryan's father Bob played on the U.S. Olympic hockey team during the 1980 Miracle on Ice; Gary later represented the U.S. at the 2002 Winter Olympics.
**Mario Tremblay**	Pascal Trepanier	Canada	
Dennis Vial	Drake Batherson*	Canada	Both have played for the Ottawa Senators. Drake's father Norm Batherson played for Ottawa's AHL affiliate but did not play in the NHL.

== Grand-uncle & grand-nephews ==
Grand-uncle	Grand-nephew	Country	Notes
**Christian** & J. P. Bordeleau	Thomas Bordeleau*	Canada, United States	
Brian & Ray Cullen	**Matt Cullen**, Mark Cullen, & Logan Morrison*	Canada	
Lou Fontinato	Greg McKegg	Canada	
**Red Kelly**	Mark Jankowski*	Canada	
**Peter Mahovlich**	Josh Anderson*	Canada	Anderson plays for the Montreal Canadiens, the same team as his grand-uncle played.
Bill Sr. & Keith McCreary	Bob Attwell	Canada	
Jim McFadden	Brendan Mikkelson	Canada	
**Lynn Patrick**	Chris Patrick	Canada, United States	
Zellio & Jerry Toppazzini	**Justin Williams**	Canada	

== Great, grand-uncle & great, grand-nephew ==
Great, grand-uncle	Great, grand-nephew	Country	Notes
Jim Bedard	Connor Bedard*	Canada	Connor plays for the Chicago Blackhawks, the same team as his great, grand-uncle played.
**Edwin Gorman**	Ryan Kuffner	Canada	
**Frank Patrick**	Chris Patrick	Canada, United States	

== Cousins ==
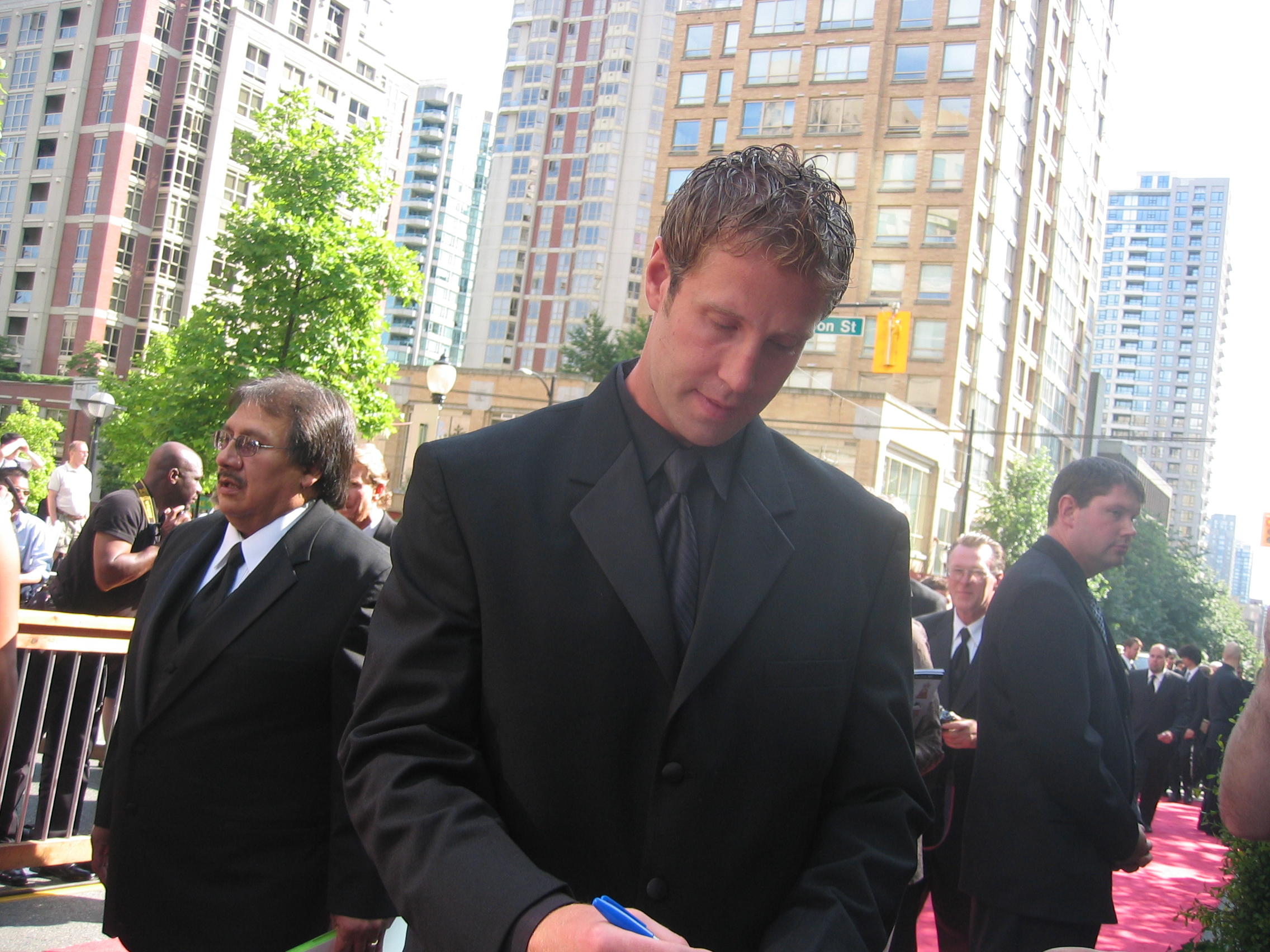
Joe Thornton was teammates with his cousin Scott on the San Jose Sharks.

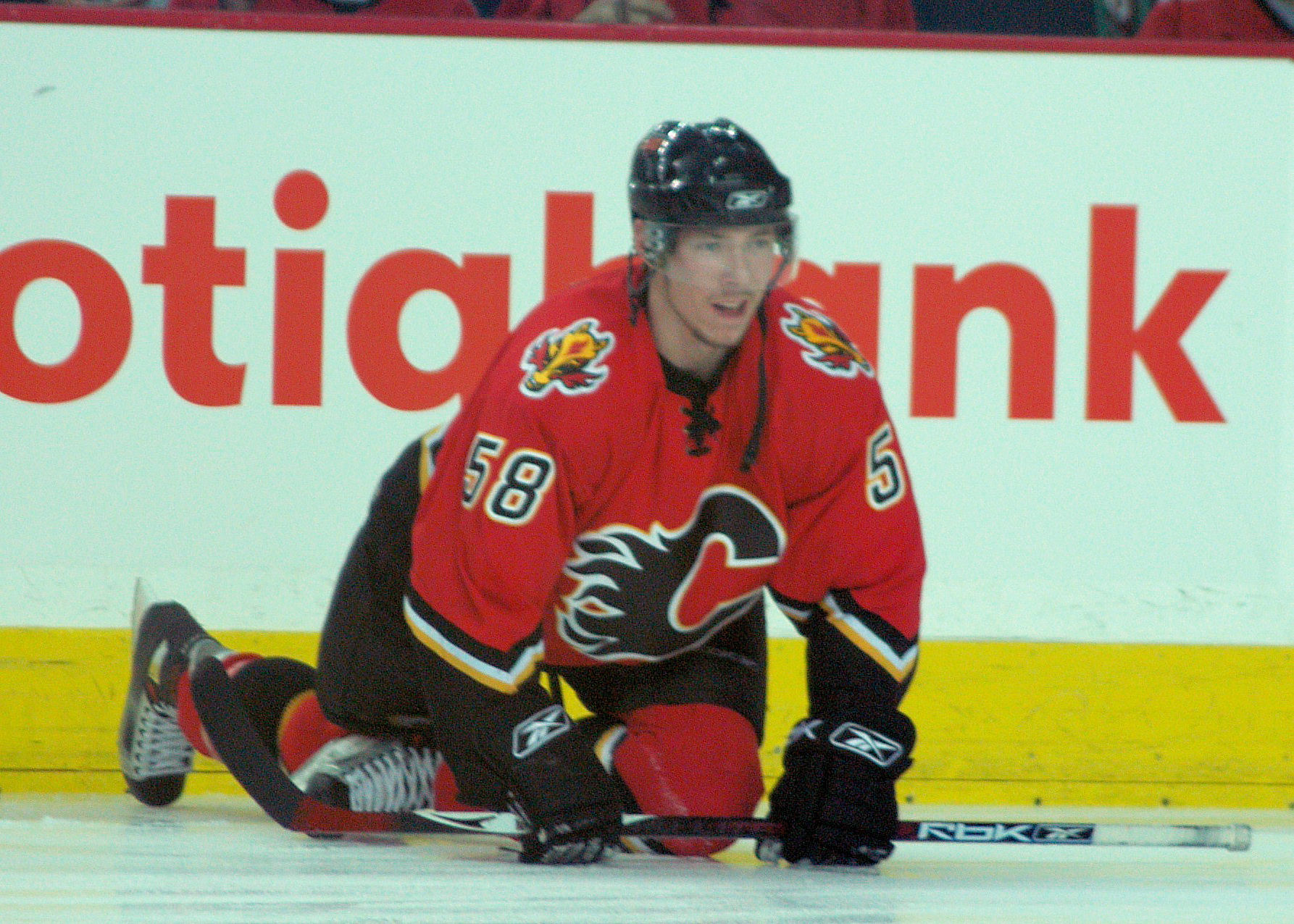
David Moss is the first cousin of Phil Kessel.

Cousin	Cousin	Cousin	Country	Notes
Tony Amonte	Charlie Coyle*	**Bobby Sheehan**	United States	Amonte and Coyle are first cousins while Sheehan and Coyle are second cousins.
Ron Attwell	Bill McCreary Jr.		Canada	
**Larry Aurie**	Cummy Burton		Canada	Burton received special permission from James Norris to wear Aurie's retired No. 6 Detroit Red Wings sweater during Burton's tenure with the team.
**Ralph Backstrom**	Daren Puppa		Canada	Backstrom had long retired by the time Puppa joined the NHL.
**Jeff Beukeboom**	**Joe Nieuwendyk**		Canada	
Henry Boucha	**T.J. Oshie**	Gary Sargent	United States	Boucha and Sargent are seconds cousins. Oshie is second cousins once removed from both Boucha and Sargent. Boucha and Sargent both played for the Minnesota North Stars.
Pierre-Marc Bouchard	P.A. Parenteau		Canada	Seconds cousins. Both played for the New York Islanders.
**Johnny Boychuk**	Zach Boychuk		Canada	Third cousins.
Connor Brickley	Daniel Brickley		United States	Second cousins
Wade & Sheldon Brookbank	Geoff Sanderson		Canada	Wade and Geoff played for the Carolina Hurricanes and the Vancouver Canucks at some point in their own careers.
Robin Burns	**Pat Burns**		Canada	
Lyndon Byers	Dane Byers		Canada	
Jim Cain	Herb Cain		Canada	
Terry Carkner	Matt Carkner		Canada	Third cousins.
**Chris Chelios**	Nikos Tselios		United States	Chris's father legally changed his family's name from Tselios to Chelios.
Marc Chouinard	Eric Chouinard		Canada	Played together during the 2003–04 NHL season for the Minnesota Wild.
Wendel Clark	**Joe Kocur**	Barry Melrose	Canada	Clark & Melrose are first cousins, and are distant cousins of Kocur. Kocur has played with both his cousins for the Detroit Red Wings; he and Melrose were teammates for part of the 1985–86 NHL season towards the end of Melrose's career, while Clark was his teammate during the 1998–99 NHL season.
**Brian Conacher**	Pete Conacher	Murray Henderson	Canada	Both Conacher cousins played for the Toronto Maple Leafs. Cory Conacher is also more distantly related.
Lucas Condotta*	Matt Martin		Canada	
**Matt** & Mark Cullen	Logan Morrison*		United States, Canada	
**Adam Deadmarsh**	Butch Deadmarsh		Canada	Second cousins.
Shane Doan	Keaton Ellerby	Carey Price	Canada	Doan and Ellerby are first cousins, and Price is their second cousin.
Ryan Donato*	John Farinacci*		United States	Farinacci currently playing for the Boston Bruins, the same team that Donato played for.
Nikolaj Ehlers*	Alexander True		Denmark	
Shawn Evans	Dennis Kearns		Canada	Evans is also cousins, once removed, with Kearns' son Bracken Kearns.
Tom Fitzgerald	Keith Tkachuk	Jimmy & Kevin Hayes	United States	Fitzgerald and Tkachuk are first cousins while the Hayes brothers are Tom's second cousins. Tom's brother Scott was a scout for the Boston Bruins, the same team Jimmy played for before his death. Tom and Jimmy played for the Chicago Blackhawks as well as the Florida Panthers during their respective careers.
Casey Fitzgerald*	**Matthew*** & Brady Tkachuk*		United States	Second cousins. All three are currently playing for the Florida Panthers.
**Ron Francis**	Mike Liut		Canada	Second cousins who both played for the Hartford Whalers.
Tim Gleason	Ben Gleason*		United States	
Chris Gratton	Dan Gratton	Josh Gratton	Canada	Josh played for the Phoenix Coyotes, where Chris played for two seasons; both also previously played for the Philadelphia Flyers.
Bep Guidolin	Aldo Guidolin		Canada	
**Bryan Hextall**	Lin Bend		Canada	Bryan and Lin were cousins from Poplar Point Mb who played together briefly in 1942 on the New York Rangers before Lin left the Rangers to volunteer for the Canadian Army during WW2. Bryan was, of course, a dominant Player for the Rangers and inducted into the HHOF in 1969. Lin never found his way back to the NHL spending 6 years after the war in the AHL and USHL. He was inducted into the Manitoba Hockey Hall of Fame in 1992.
Dale Hoganson	Paul Hoganson		Canada	
Bo Horvat*	Travis Konecny*		Canada	Second cousins
Calle Jarnkrok	Elias Lindholm*		Sweden	They played with Brynäs in the SEL together for a couple of years before coming to the NHL. They also played together for the Calgary Flames in 2021-22.
Christian Jaros	Erik Cernak*		Slovakia	
**Doug Jarvis**	Wes Jarvis		Canada	Both played for the Washington Capitals, but just missed playing together; Wes was traded to the Minnesota North Stars a month before Doug came over from Montreal.
Joe Jensen	Nick Jensen*		United States	second cousins.
Steve Jensen	David Jensen		United States	first cousins, and played for the Minnesota North Stars.
Kasperi Kapanen*	Oliver Kapanen*		Finland	
Reg Kerr	Alan Kerr		Canada	
**Phil Kessel**	David Moss		United States	
**Joe Kocur**	**Chandler Stephenson***		Canada	
Paul LaDue	Luke Johnson		United States	
Georges Laraque	Jean-Luc Grand-Pierre		Canada	
Michael Latta	Logan Stanley*		Canada	
**Ted Lindsay**	**Bob Errey**		Canada	Third cousins. Both played for the Detroit Red Wings.
**Ben Lovejoy**	Gavin Bayreuther		United States	
Morris Lukowich	Bernie Lukowich		Canada	Morris is also cousins, once removed, with Bernie's son Brad Lukowich.
Ryan Malone	Brad Malone		United States, Canada	
**Darren McCarty**	Easton Cowan*		Canada	
Kelly, Kevin & Kip Miller	Ryan & **Drew** Miller		United States	First cousins, once removed. Kelly, Kevin & Kip's father, Lyle Miller, and Ryan and Drew's grandfather, Elwood Miller, were brothers. Kevin and Drew played for the Detroit Red Wings. Ryan, Drew and Kip played for the Anaheim Ducks.
**Craig Muni**	Gerry O'Flaherty		Canada, United States	Both played for the Toronto Maple Leafs.
Bob & Don Murdoch	Paul & **Mark** Messier	James Wisniewski	Canada, United States	Second cousins. Messier's grandfather, John Dea, Murdoch's grandmother, Christine Dea, and Wisniewski's granduncle, Howard Dea were siblings. Mark and Don played for the Edmonton Oilers and New York Rangers.
Mitch & Joby Messier	Paul & **Mark** Messier		Canada	Second cousins. Joby & Mark played together from 1992 to 1995 with the New York Rangers.
**Scott** & **Rob Niedermayer**	Jason Strudwick		Canada	First cousins
**Craig Patrick**	Chris Patrick		United States	First cousins once removed. Craig played for the Washington Capitals from 1976 to 1979. Chris is the general manager for the Washington Capitals.
**Mike David Peluso**	Mike Peluso		United States	Both played for the Chicago Blackhawks and the New Jersey Devils.
**Jim Peplinski**	Larry Trader		Canada	
Bob Perreault	Gilbert Perreault		Canada	
Jimmy Peters, Jr.	Glen Currie		Canada	Both played for the Los Angeles Kings.
Owen Pickering*	Denton Mateychuk*		Canada	Second cousins
**Frank Pietrangelo**	**Alex Pietrangelo***		Canada	Third cousins.
Tyler Pitlick	Rem Pitlick		United States	Teammates for the Montreal Canadiens in 2022. Both also spent time with the Minnesota Wild.
**Jean** & **Denis Potvin**	Marc Potvin		Canada	Second cousins. Marc & Jean both played for the Los Angeles Kings.
**Joel Quenneville**	John Quenneville		Canada	First cousins once removed. John played for the New Jersey Devils from 2016-2019, the same team that Joel played for.
Dick & **Mickey** Redmond	Craig Redmond		Canada	Second cousins.
Randy Rota	Darcy Rota		Canada	
Philippe Sauve	Maxime Sauve		United States, Canada	Both were drafted in the second round of their respective drafts.
Jean Savard	**Denis Savard**		Canada	
Nick Schultz	Jesse Schultz		Canada	
**Brendan Shanahan**	Luke Evangelista*		Canada	First cousins once removed. Luke plays for the New Jersey Devils, the same team Brendan played for.
Dalton Smith	Cayden Primeau*		Canada, United States	
**Eric**, Marc, **Jordan***, & Jared Staal	Jeff Heerema		Canada	All Staal brothers, except Marc, have played for the Carolina Hurricanes, where Jeff used to play.
Alex Stalock	Adam Wilcox		United States	Both were goaltenders.
Mitchell Stephens*	Owen Tippett*		Canada	
Shay Stephenson	Chandler Stephenson*		Canada	
Cam Stewart	Greg Stewart		Canada	
Brett Sutter	Brandon Sutter	Brody Sutter	Canada	All Sutter cousins, except Brody, were former players of the Carolina Hurricanes. Brett and Brandon played sixteen games together with the Carolina Hurricanes across the 2010–11 and 2011-12 seasons. Brandon was part of a 'family' trade in 2012, teaming brothers Jordan and Eric Staal in Carolina for the 2012–13 NHL season.
Scott Thornton	Joe Thornton		Canada	Played together for part of the 2005–06 NHL season with the San Jose Sharks.
John Tonelli	Ryan Jones		Canada	John Tonelli's brother Ray also played in the IHL and USHL. John and Ray Tonelli's mother is Joy Sclisizzi, who is related to NHLer Enio Sclisizzi.
Perry Turnbull	Randy Turnbull		Canada	Randy only played one game in the NHL.
Marc-Édouard Vlasic	Alex Vlasic*		Canada, United States	
Alex Wennberg*	Anton Johansson*		Sweden	
Fabian Zetterlund*	Andre Lee*		Sweden	Second cousins. They played against each other on October 25th, 2024 when the Kings hosted the Sharks at Crypto.com Arena.

== In-laws ==
This category is for pairings of in-laws.

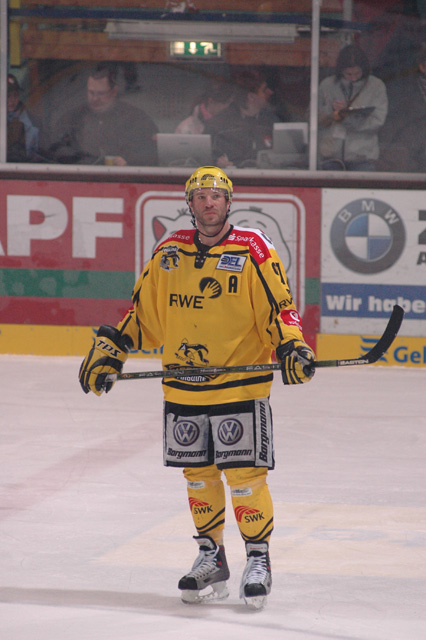
Alexander Selivanov's father-in-law is Phil Esposito, who was his general manager while he played for the Tampa Bay Lightning.

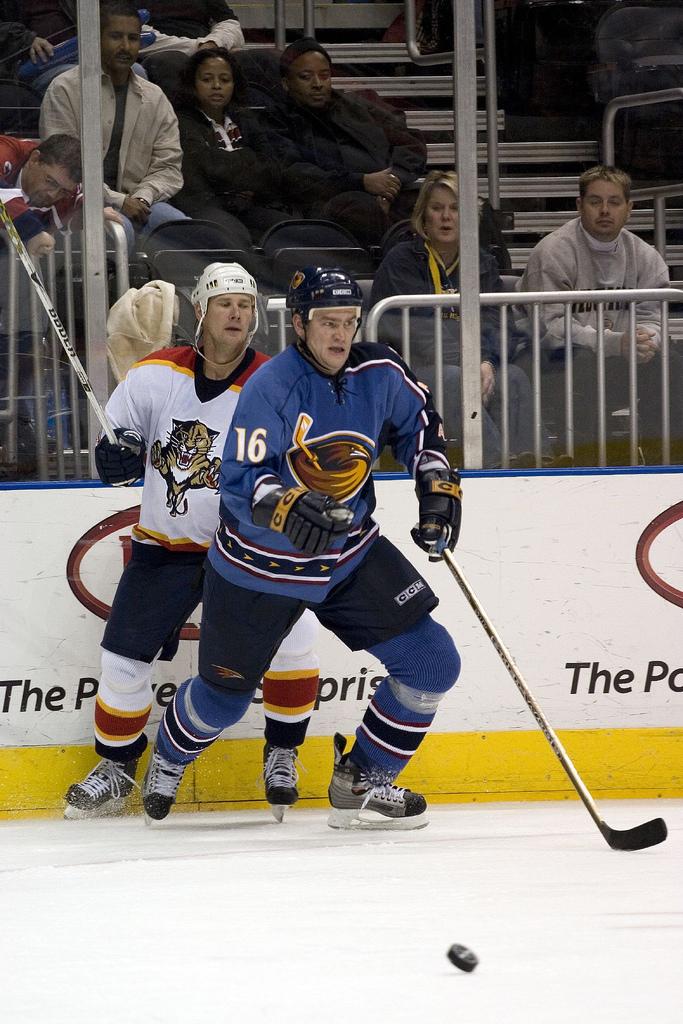
Bobby Holik, pictured here with the Atlanta Thrashers, is the brother-in-law of Frank Musil.

In-law	In-law	Country	Notes
**Sid Abel**	Bob Johnson	Canada, United States	Johnson's father-in-law.
Gerry Abel	Bob Johnson	Canada, United States	Johnson's brother-in-law.
Maxim Afinogenov	Max Pacioretty	Russia, United States	Brothers-in-law. Pacioretty married Afinogenov's sister, Katia Afinogenova.
Mike Backman	Matt Moulson & **Jonathan Quick**	Canada, United States	Mike Backman is father-in-law to both. Moulson is married to Backman's daughter Alicia. Quick is married to Backman's daughter Jaclyn.
**Pete Backor**	Rudy Migay	Canada	Brothers-in-law who both played for the Toronto Maple Leafs.
Mike Boland	Don Luce	Canada	Brothers-in-law who both played together for part of the 1978–79 NHL season with the Buffalo Sabres. Luce is married to Boland's sister, Diane.
John Blum	Paul & **Mark** Messier	Canada	Brothers-in-law. John and Mark both played for the Edmonton Oilers. Blum is married to Paul and Mark's sister, Jennifer.
John Blum	Mitch & Joby Messier	Canada	Second cousins-in-law.
Garth Butcher	Doug & Mark Morrison	Canada	Butcher and Morrisons are brothers-in-law. Butcher is married to Morrisons' sister.
Josh Gorges	Doug & Mark Morrison	Canada	Gorges is Doug's son-in-law and Mark's nephew-in-law.
**Guy Carbonneau**	Brenden Morrow	Canada	Father-in-law and son-in-law, who were teammates on the Dallas Stars for the 1999–2000 NHL season.
Jeff Chychrun	Luke Richardson	Canada	Brothers-in-law. Chychrun married Richardson's sister, Nancy. Both played for the Edmonton Oilers, as teammates, and the Philadelphia Flyers.
Casey Cizikas*	Sean Monahan*	Canada	Brothers-in-law. Cizikas' wife Kristy and Monahan's wife Brittany are sisters.
**Bobby Clarke**	Peter White	Canada	Father-in-law and son-in-law. White played for the Philadelphia Flyers while Clarke was the team's general manager.
Shayne Corson	Darcy Tucker	Canada	Brothers-in-law who played together for the Montreal Canadiens from 1996 to 1998, and the Toronto Maple Leafs from 2000 to 2003. Tucker is married to Corson's sister, Shannon.
Alain Cote	Luc Dufour	Canada	Dufour's brother-in-law.
Jean-Philippe Cote	Luc Dufour	Canada	Dufour's nephew-in-law. Cote and Dufour both played for the Quebec Nordiques.
Bob Dill	Bob Paradise	United States	Father-in-law and son-in-law.
Ted Donato	John Farinacci	United States	Uncle-in-law and nephew-in-law. Donato's wife and Farinacci's mother are sisters.
Casey Fitzgerald	John Farinacci	United States	Second cousins-in-law.
**Matthew*** & Brady* Tkachuk	John Farinacci	United States	Brothers-in-law. Brady married Farinacci's sister, Emma.
Dallas Eakins	Andreas Karlsson	Canada, Sweden	Brothers-in-law. Both Ingrid Kavelaars, wife of Eakins, and Monique Kavelaars, wife of Karlsson, are twin sisters.
**Phil Esposito**	Alexander Selivanov	Canada, Russia	Selivanov's father-in-law. Selivanov played for the Tampa Bay Lightning while Phil was the team's general manager.
**Tony Esposito**	Alexander Selivanov	Canada, Russia	Selivanov's uncle-in-law.
Micheal Ferland	Brett Kulak*	Canada	Cousins-in-law. Ferland's wife Kayleigh and Kulak's wife Caitlyn are cousins.
Ray Ferraro	Don & Tony Granato	Canada, United States	Ray and Tony were brothers-in-law who played together for part of the 1995–96 NHL season with the Los Angeles Kings; they also played, though not together, for the New York Rangers. Don never played in the NHL but served as a head coach of the Buffalo Sabres since the 2020–21 NHL season. Ferraro is married to Don and Tony's sister Cammi, who played for the United States women's national ice hockey team.
Patrick Flatley	Jake Evans*	Canada	Father-in-law and son-in-law. Evans married Flatley's daughter, Emily.
Mike, Nick* & Marcus* Foligno	Eddie Giacomin	Canada	Giacomin's nephew-in-law and grand-nephew-in-law. Eddie and Mike played for the Detroit Red Wings. Mike married Eddie's niece, Janis Giacomin, mother to Nick and Marcus.
Mike, Nick* & Marcus* Foligno	Wade Redden	Canada, United States	Redden's uncle-in-law and cousins-in-law. Nick and Wade both played for the Ottawa Senators. Redden married Mike's niece and Nick and Marcus' cousin, Danica Topolnisky.
**Jonah Gadjovich***	Spencer Martin*	Canada	Brothers-in-law. Both played for the Vancouver Canucks.
Danny Gare	Tom Renney	Canada	Brothers-in-law. They have been part of the Edmonton Oilers organization, though not simultaneously. Danny was a player in 1986–87 NHL season and Tom was the head coach from 2010-2012.
**Bernie Geoffrion**	Hartland Monahan	Canada	Monahan's father-in-law.
Dan Geoffrion	Hartland Monahan	Canada	Monahan's brother-in-law.
Blake Geoffrion	Hartland Monahan	Canada	Monahan's nephew-in-law.
Ken Gernander	Trent Klatt	United States	Brothers-in-law. Were linemates together for the University of Minnesota Golden Gophers.
**Ryan Getzlaf**	Keith Aulie	Canada	Cousins-in-law. Aulie married Getzlaf's cousin, Ashley Getzlaf.
Doug Gibson	Craig Ramsay	Canada	Brothers-in-law.
**Clark Gillies**	**Bob Bourne**	Canada	Brothers-in-law. Both played for the New York Islanders. Bourne's son, Justin, married Gillies' daughter, Brianna.
Colton Gillies	**Bob Bourne**	Canada	Bourne's nephew-in-law.
Kevin Hatcher	Tristan Jarry*	United States, Canada	Jarry's father-in-law. Jarry and Kevin both played for the Pittsburgh Penguins. Jarry married Kevin's daughter. Hannah.
**Derian Hatcher**	Tristan Jarry*	United States, Canada	Jarry's uncle-in-law.
**Bobby Holik**	Frank Musil	Czech Republic	Brothers-in-law. Musil is married to Holik's sister, Andrea Holikova.
Kerry Huffman	Mike Posavad	Canada	Brothers-in-law.
**Pat Hughes**	**Mark Napier**	Canada	Brothers-in-law who won the Stanley Cup twice together, first with the Montreal Canadiens in 1979 and again with the Edmonton Oilers in 1985. Both also played for the Buffalo Sabres.
Doug Jarvis	Dwight Foster	Canada	Cousins-in-law.
**Wes Jarvis**	Dwight Foster	Canada	Brothers-in-law. Foster married Jarvis' sister, Maryann.
**Mike Keenan**	**Joe Nieuwendyk**	Canada	Second cousins-in-law. Both Keenan and Nieuwendyk were part of the Calgary Flames and the Florida Panthers organizations as a head coach and a player, respectively. Keenan's second cousin, Derek, married Nieuwendyk's sister, Wendy.
**Red Kelly**	Lou Jankowski	Canada	Brothers-in-law. Both played for the Detroit Red Wings.
Travis Konecny*	Brody Sutter	Canada	Brothers-in-law. Konecny's wife Karly and Sutter's wife Kristin are twin sisters.
Rick Lapointe	Brad Maxwell	Canada	Brothers-in-law. Both played for the Quebec Nordiques.
Rick Ley	Don Lever	Canada	Brothers-in-law. Ley is married to Lever's sister, Ellen.
**Bob Lorimer**	Jim Nahrgang	Canada	Brothers-in-law.
Tom Lysiak	Justin Braun	Canada, United States	Braun's father-in-law. Braun is married to Lysiak's daughter and Makar's cousin, Jessie.
**Cale*** & Taylor Makar	Justin Braun	Canada, United States	Second cousins-in-law.
Dave & Don Maloney	Doug Sulliman	Canada	Brothers-in-law who were teammates on the New York Rangers from 1979 to 1981; Don and Doug were also played for the Hartford Whalers, but not together.
Howie Menard	Darren Eliot	Canada	Eliot's father-in-law. Both played for the Detroit Red Wings and the Los Angeles Kings.
Hillary Menard	Darren Eliot	Canada	Eliot's uncle-in-law.
Joe Micheletti	**Mike Modano**	United States	Modano's father-in-law. Modano married Micheletti's daughter, Allison.
Pat Micheletti	**Mike Modano**	United States	Modano's uncle-in-law. Both played for the Minnesota North Stars.
**Howie Morenz**	**Bernie Geoffrion**	Canada	Father-in-law and son-in-law who both played for the Montreal Canadiens and New York Rangers.
Billy Coutu	**Bernie Geoffrion** & **Howie Morenz**	Canada	Coutu's sister-in-law was Morenz's mother-in-law, and Geoffrion's grandmother. Coutu and Morenz played together on the Montreal Canadiens.
**Kirk Muller**	Brad Malone	Canada	Father-in-law and son-in-law. Malone married Muller's daughter, Bryelle.
**Murray Murdoch**	Billy Dea	Canada	Cousins-in-law. Both played for the New York Rangers.
Mike Murphy	Vic Venasky	Canada	Brothers-in-law who were teammates on the Los Angeles Kings from 1973 to 1979.
Brady Murray	Mason Raymond	Canada	Second cousins-in-law. Raymond married Murray's second cousin, Megan.
Evgeny Namestnikov	**Vyacheslav Kozlov**	Russia	Brothers-in-law. Namestnikov married Kozlov's sister.
Michal Neuvirth	Radko Gudas*	Czech Republic	Brothers-in-law. Both were briefly teammates in the Philadelphia Flyers organization when Gudas was traded to Philadelphia on June 14, 2019. Neuvirth became a free agent sixteen days later. Neuvirth married Gudas' sister, Karolina.
**Kent** & Robert Nilsson	**Nikolai Khabibulin**	Sweden, Russia	Khabibulin's brother-in-law and son-in-law. Robert married Khabibulin's daughter, Sasha. All three played for the Edmonton Oilers. Kent and Khabibulin played for the Winnipeg Jets, of the WHA and the NHL, respectively. Robert and Khabibulin were teammates on the Edmonton Oilers from 2009–10 NHL season
Petteri Nummelin	**Antti Niemi**	Finland	Brothers-in-law. Niemi married Nummelin's sister.
Ville Peltonen	**Artturi Lehkonen***	Finland	Father-in-law and son-in-law. Lehkonen married Peltonen's daughter, Emmi.
**Jacques Plante**	**Nathan Horton**	Canada	Horton married Plante's great-niece Tammy, a model. Jacques ended his NHL career with the Bruins, the same team Nathan joined in 2010.
Carey Price	Yannick Weber	Canada, Switzerland	Brothers-in-law. Both played for the Montreal Canadiens. Weber married Price's sister, Kayla.
Bob Pulford	**Dean Lombardi**	Canada, United States	Father-in-law and son-in-law who both became general manager of the Los Angeles Kings.
Mika Pyorala	Pekka Rinne	Finland	Brothers-in-law. Pyorala married Rinne's twin sister, Anna.
**Daryl Reaugh**	Brendan Morrison	Canada	Brothers-in-law. Both Kristin, wife of Reaugh, and Erin, wife of Morrison, are sisters.
**Cory Sarich**	Nick Schultz	Canada	Brothers-in-law. Both Reagan Dibb, wife of Sarich, and Jessica Dibb, wife of Schultz, are sisters.
Jeff Serowik	Noah Dobson*	United States, Canada	Father-in-law and son-in-law. Dobson married Serowik's daughter, Alexa.
Derrick Smith	Keith & Wayne Primeau	Canada	Brothers-in-law. Derrick and Keith played for the Philadelphia Flyers.
Pat Stapleton	Ed Kastelic	Canada	Kastelic's father-in-law. Katelic married Pat's daughter, Susan.
Mike Stapleton	Ed Kastelic	Canada	Kastelic's brother-in-law.
Bud Stefanski	**Cory Stillman**	Canada	Father-in-law and son-in-law. Stillman married Stefanski's daughter, Mara. Bud played only one game in the NHL.
Mark Stone*	Cody Ceci*	Canada	Brothers-in-law. Stone's wife, Hayley, and Ceci's wife, Jamie, are sisters.
Mike, Mark, & Colin Stuart	Nate Thompson	United States	Brothers-in-law. Thompson married Stuart's sister, Cristin. Both Mark and Nate played for the Boston Bruins.
**Mike Sullivan**	Charlie McAvoy*	United States	McAvoy's father-in-law. He plays for the Boston Bruins, the same team that Sullivan played for and coached. McAvoy married Sullivan's daughter, Kiley.
**Mike Sullivan**	**Conor Sheary***	United States	Sheary's uncle-in-law. Sullivan coached Sheary on the Pittsburgh Penguins and the New York Rangers. Sheary married Sullivan's niece, Jordan.
John Taft	Matt Gilroy	United States	Father-in-law and son-in-law. Gilroy married Taft's daughter, Jenny Taft.
**Maxime Talbot**	Dion Phaneuf	Canada	Fourth cousins-in-law. Talbot married Phaneuf's fourth cousin, Cynthia Phaneuf.
Steve Thomas	Adam Henrique*	Canada	Henrique's father-in-law. Thomas and Henrique played for the New Jersey Devils and the Anaheim Ducks.
Christian Thomas	Adam Henrique*	Canada	Henrique's brother-in-law. Henrique married Thomas' sister, Lauren.
Darcy Tucker	Lucas Condotta*	Canada	Father-in-law and son-in-law. Condotta married Tucker's daughter, Owynn.
**Josef Vasicek**	Thomas Vanek	Czech Republic, Austria	Brothers-in-law. Vasicek's sister married Vanek's brother.
Vladimir Vujtek	Robert & Ronald Petrovicky	Czech Republic, Slovakia	Brothers-in-law. Vladimir and Robert played for the Tampa Bay Lightning. Vladimir and Ronald played for the Atlanta Thrashers and the Pittsburgh Penguins.
Noah Welch	Paul Postma	United States, Canada	Brothers-in-law. Both played for the Atlanta Thrashers. Welch married Postma's sister, Alissa.

== See also ==
- List of professional sports families
- List of family relations in American football
  - List of second-generation National Football League players
- List of association football (soccer) families
  - List of African association football families
  - List of European association football families
    - List of English association football families
    - List of former Yugoslavia association football families
    - List of Scottish football families
    - List of Spanish association football families
  - Category:Association football families
- List of Australian rules football families
- List of second-generation Major League Baseball players
- List of second-generation National Basketball Association players
- List of boxing families
- List of chess families
- List of International cricket families
- List of family relations in rugby league
- List of international rugby union families
- List of professional wrestling families
