= Keith McCreary =

Canadian ice hockey player

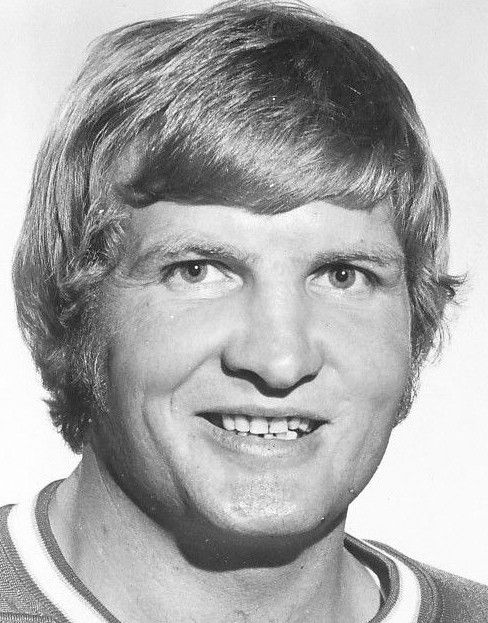
- Born: June 19, 1940 Sundridge, Ontario, Canada
- Died: December 9, 2003 (aged 63) Caledon, Ontario, Canada
- Height: 5 ft 10 in (178 cm)
- Weight: 180 lb (82 kg; 12 st 12 lb)
- Position: Left wing
- Shot: Left
- Played for: Montreal Canadiens; Pittsburgh Penguins; Atlanta Flames
- Playing career: 1961–1975

Vernon Keith McCreary (June 19, 1940 – December 9, 2003) was a Canadian left winger in the National Hockey League who played for the Montreal Canadiens, Pittsburgh Penguins and Atlanta Flames.

== Playing career ==
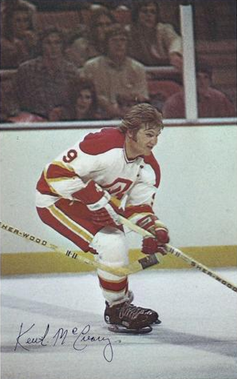
Keith McCreary in 1972 for Atlanta Flames

As property of the Montreal Canadiens, McCreary spent seven years in the minor league system, only promoted for a single playoff game in 1962 and 9 games during the 1964–65 season. During this time, he was a top scorer for the Hull-Ottawa Canadiens.

He became an NHL regular with the Pittsburgh Penguins following the 1967 NHL Expansion. In 1972, he was claimed by the Atlanta Flames in the Expansion Draft and was designated the franchise's first captain. McCreary retired following the 1974–75 season after 532 NHL games. He recorded a total of 131 goals and 116 assists during his NHL career.

McCreary played for the Montreal Canadiens, Pittsburgh Penguins, Atlanta Flames, Hershey Bears, Hull-Ottawa Canadiens, and Cleveland Barons.

His brother, Bill McCreary Sr., was also an NHL left winger.

== Life and retirement ==
McCreary is the brother of Bill McCreary Sr., the uncle of Bill McCreary Jr. and Bob Attwell, and the brother-in-law of Ron Attwell.

He was elected as Regional councillor for Caledon, Ontario in 1978, eventually losing in the 1988 election against Carol Seglins, who later became Mayor of Caledon. He stood for consideration in 1991 as a candidate for the appointed role of Regional Chair. Emil Kolb won the position.

McCreary joined the NHL Alumni Association and was the Association's chairman. He died after a long bout with cancer at the age of 63. He is buried at Laurel Hill Cemetery in Bolton, Ontario.

His Atlanta Flames jersey is on display at the Hockey Hall of Fame.

== Career statistics ==
=== Regular season and playoffs ===
			Regular season					Playoffs
Season	Team	League	GP	G	A	Pts	PIM	GP	G	A	Pts	PIM
1956–57	Peterboro T.P.T's	OHA	22	0	1	1	0	—	—	—	—	—
1959–60	Hull-Ottawa Canadiens	EPHL	5	0	0	0	0	—	—	—	—	—
1960–61	Hull-Ottawa Canadiens	EPHL	61	19	21	40	35	14	4	2	6	15
1961–62	Hull-Ottawa Canadiens	EPHL	64	30	36	66	48	12	5	8	13	2
1961–62	Montreal Canadiens	NHL	—	—	—	—	—	1	0	0	0	0
1962–63	Hull-Ottawa Canadiens	EPHL	69	27	34	61	44	3	1	1	2	0
1963–64	Hershey Bears	AHL	66	25	19	44	21	6	2	4	6	2
1964–65	Hershey Bears	AHL	46	16	18	34	36	14	0	7	7	24
1964–65	Montreal Canadiens	NHL	9	0	3	3	4	—	—	—	—	—
1965–66	Cleveland Barons	AHL	66	18	24	42	42	2	5	4	9	8
1966–67	Cleveland Barons	AHL	70	28	29	57	50	5	1	2	3	0
1967–68	Pittsburgh Penguins	NHL	70	14	12	26	44	—	—	—	—	—
1968–69	Pittsburgh Penguins	NHL	70	25	23	48	42	—	—	—	—	—
1969–70	Pittsburgh Penguins	NHL	60	18	8	26	67	10	0	4	4	4
1970–71	Pittsburgh Penguins	NHL	59	21	12	33	24	—	—	—	—	—
1971–72	Pittsburgh Penguins	NHL	33	4	4	8	22	1	0	0	0	2
1972–73	Atlanta Flames	NHL	77	20	21	41	21	—	—	—	—	—
1973–74	Atlanta Flames	NHL	76	18	19	37	62	4	0	0	0	0
1974–75	Atlanta Flames	NHL	78	11	10	21	8	—	—	—	—	—
NHL totals			532	131	112	243	294	16	0	4	4	6

== Awards ==
- EPHL First All-Star Team (1962)
- EPHL Second All-Star Team (1963)
- Inducted into the Caledon Sports Hall of Fame (2025)

== Transactions ==
- June 6, 1967 – Claimed by the Pittsburgh Penguins from the Montreal Canadiens in the 1967 NHL Expansion Draft.
- June 6, 1972 – Claimed by the Atlanta Flames from the Pittsburgh Penguins in the 1972 NHL Expansion Draft.

Preceded by Position created	Atlanta Flames captain 1972–75	Succeeded by Pat Quinn
