= Charlotte Grahame =

American ice hockey executive

Charlotte Grahame is the Executive Director of Hockey Administration for the Colorado Avalanche.

As a member of the Colorado executive management during the 2000–01 NHL season, when Colorado won the Stanley Cup, her name was engraved on it. Her son John had his name engraved on the Cup as a member of the 2004 Tampa Bay Lightning.

Her husband Ron was part of the trade which eventually brought Ray Bourque to the Boston Bruins, with whom her son John would later become a teammate.

== See also ==
- Notable families in the NHL
