= Bill McCreary Jr. =

American ice hockey player (born 1960)

- Born: April 15, 1960 (age 66) Springfield, Massachusetts, U.S.
- Height: 6 ft 0 in (183 cm)
- Weight: 196 lb (89 kg; 14 st 0 lb)
- Position: Left wing
- Shot: Right
- Played for: Toronto Maple Leafs
- NHL draft: 114th overall, 1979; Toronto Maple Leafs
- Playing career: 1980–1988

William Edward McCreary Jr. (born April 15, 1960) is an American former professional ice hockey player who played 12 games in the National Hockey League with the Toronto Maple Leafs during the 1980–81 season. The rest of his career, which lasted from 1980 to 1988, was spent in the minor leagues.

== Early life ==
McCreary Jr. was born in Springfield, Massachusetts, and raised in Hudson, Ohio.

== Playing career ==
Bill McCreary Jr. was drafted in the 6th round, 114th overall, by the Toronto Maple Leafs in the 1979 NHL entry draft. He played two seasons of hockey for the Colgate University in the NCAA before signing a contract with the Toronto Maple Leafs in June 1980. He then split the 1980–81 season between the New Brunswick Hawks of the AHL and the Maple Leafs. He played 61 games in the AHL and 12 in the NHL with the Leafs that season. In those twelve games, he scored one goal, had no assists, and added four penalty minutes. That would be the extent of his NHL playing experience as he played out the rest of his career in the CHL, IHL, and AHL. He retired following the 1987–88 IHL season.

Bill McCreary is most remembered for his open-ice hit on Wayne Gretzky on January 3, 1981. The myth that McCreary never played another shift in the NHL is false – the January 3 game was McCreary's second game in his 12-game NHL career.

== Family ==
He is the son of former NHLer Bill McCreary Sr., nephew of former NHLers Keith McCreary and Ron Attwell, and cousin of former NHLer Bob Attwell and NHL referee Bill McCreary. His son, William "Billy" McCreary III, was a minor league hockey player in the Southern Professional Hockey League, Central Hockey League, and Federal Hockey League.

== Career statistics ==
=== Regular season and playoffs ===
			Regular season					Playoffs
Season	Team	League	GP	G	A	Pts	PIM	GP	G	A	Pts	PIM
1976–77	Cleveland Barons NAHL	GLJHL	40	26	24	50	—	—	—	—	—	—
1977–78	Cleveland Barons NAHL	GLJHL	40	51	72	123	—	—	—	—	—	—
1978–79	Colgate University	ECAC	24	19	25	44	70	—	—	—	—	—
1979–80	Colgate University	ECAC	12	7	13	20	44	—	—	—	—	—
1980–81	Toronto Maple Leafs	NHL	12	1	0	1	4	—	—	—	—	—
1980–81	New Brunswick Hawks	AHL	61	19	24	43	120	12	2	0	2	13
1981–82	Cincinnati Tigers	CHL	69	8	27	35	61	4	0	4	4	2
1982–83	Saginaw Gears	IHL	60	19	28	47	17	—	—	—	—	—
1982–83	Peoria Prancers	IHL	16	4	6	10	11	—	—	—	—	—
1982–83	St. Catharines Saints	AHL	4	0	1	1	2	—	—	—	—	—
1983–84	Milwaukee Admirals	IHL	81	28	35	63	44	4	0	2	2	2
1984–85	Milwaukee Admirals	IHL	10	1	10	11	4	—	—	—	—	—
1985–86	Milwaukee Admirals	IHL	80	30	31	61	83	5	3	0	3	6
1986–87	Milwaukee Admirals	IHL	74	30	35	65	64	6	2	2	4	10
1987–88	Milwaukee Admirals	IHL	67	23	30	53	51	—	—	—	—	—
IHL totals			388	135	175	310	274	15	5	4	9	18
NHL totals			12	1	0	1	4	—	—	—	—	—
