= Howard Dea =

Canadian ice hockey player

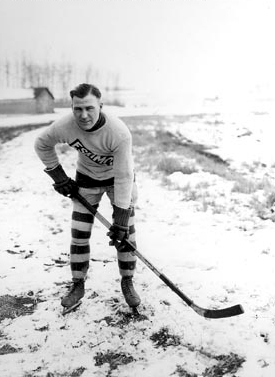
- Dea with the Edmonton Eskimos, circa 1921
- Born: April 9, 1891; Midland, Ontario, Canada
- Died: February 9, 1966 (aged 74); Edmonton, Alberta, Canada
- Height: 5 ft 7 in (170 cm)
- Weight: 175 lb (79 kg; 12 st 7 lb)
- Position: Centre
- Shot: Left
- Played for: Calgary Tigers; Edmonton Eskimos
- Playing career: 1913–1926

Howard Edmund Dea (April 9, 1891 – February 9, 1966) was a Canadian professional ice hockey player. He played with the Calgary Tigers and Edmonton Eskimos of the Western Canada Hockey League. Billy Dea, uncle of James Wisniewski, is his son.
