= Jack Schmidt =

Canadian ice hockey player

- Born: November 11, 1924 Odessa, Saskatchewan, Canada
- Died: November 15, 2004 (aged 80) Etobicoke, Ontario, Canada
- Height: 5 ft 10 in (178 cm)
- Weight: 155 lb (70 kg; 11 st 1 lb)
- Position: Left wing
- Shot: Left
- Played for: Boston Bruins
- Playing career: 1942–1953

John Reinhart "Jack, Jackie" Schmidt (November 11, 1924 – November 15, 2004) was a professional ice hockey player who played 45 games in the National Hockey League with the Boston Bruins during the 1942–43 season. The rest of his career, which lasted from 1942 to 1953, was spent in the minor leagues. He also served in World War II. Jack is the brother of Joe Schmidt.

Schmidt scored his first NHL goal on November 22, 1942, in Boston's 7-6 victory over the Toronto Maple Leafs.

== Career statistics ==
=== Regular season and playoffs ===
			Regular season					Playoffs
Season	Team	League	GP	G	A	Pts	PIM	GP	G	A	Pts	PIM
1941–42	Regina Abbotts	S-SJHL	11	10	3	13	4	5	2	0	2	6
1941–42	Regina Abbotts	M-Cup	—	—	—	—	—	9	5	5	10	6
1942–43	Providence Reds	AHL	4	1	3	4	6	—	—	—	—	—
1942–43	Boston Bruins	NHL	45	6	7	13	6	5	0	0	0	0
1943–44	Toronto RCAF	TIHL	4	0	0	0	0	—	—	—	—	—
1943–44	Toronto CIL	TMHL	—	9	16	25	4	7	7	5	12	4
1943–44	Halifax Navy	NSDHL	—	—	—	—	—	4	0	0	0	2
1944–45	Dartmouth RCAF	NSDHL	7	5	4	9	4	—	—	—	—	—
1946–47	New Westminster Royals	PCHL	61	13	20	33	23	14	0	0	0	4
1947–48	Valleyfield Braves	QSHL	40	23	14	37	15	6	2	3	5	2
1948–49	Valleyfield Braves	QSHL	63	28	41	69	32	4	0	0	0	0
1949–50	Valleyfield Braves	QSHL	57	33	22	55	28	5	1	3	4	—
1950–51	Valleyfield Braves	QSHL	56	27	40	67	37	16	11	6	17	0
1951–52	Valleyfield Braves	QSHL	37	12	17	29	8	5	1	0	1	4
1952–53	Valleyfield Braves	QSHL	51	9	17	26	27	4	1	0	1	0
QSHL totals			304	132	151	283	147	40	16	12	28	6
NHL totals			45	6	7	13	6	5	0	0	0	0
