= Joe Schmidt (ice hockey) =

Canadian ice hockey player

- Born: November 5, 1926; Odessa, Saskatchewan, Canada
- Died: September 30, 2000 (aged 73); Regina, Saskatchewan, Canada
- Height: 6 ft 0 in (183 cm)
- Weight: 200 lb (91 kg; 14 st 4 lb)
- Position: Defence
- Shot: Left
- Played for: Boston Bruins
- Playing career: 1943–1952

Joseph Frank "Otto" Schmidt (November 5, 1926 – September 30, 2000) was a Canadian professional ice hockey player who played two games in the National Hockey League for the Boston Bruins during the 1943–44 season. The rest of his career, which lasted from 1943 to 1952, was spent in various minor leagues.

His brother, Jack Schmidt, also played for the Bruins, playing one season, in 1942. He died on September 30, 2000, in Regina.

== Career statistics ==
=== Regular season and playoffs ===
			Regular season					Playoffs
Season	Team	League	GP	G	A	Pts	PIM	GP	G	A	Pts	PIM
1942–43	Regina Abbotts	S-SJHL	1	0	0	0	2	—	—	—	—	—
1943–44	Regina Abbotts	S-SJHL	2	0	0	0	0	7	2	3	5	2
1943–44	Boston Bruins	NHL	2	0	0	0	0	—	—	—	—	—
1943–44	Boston Olympics	EAHL	32	12	22	34	8	9	1	2	3	2
1943–44	Toronto CIL	TMHL	9	9	16	25	4	7	7	5	12	4
1944–45	Boston Olympics	EAHL	48	31	36	67	16	12	14	4	18	7
1944–45	Saskatoon Falcons	S-SJHL	7	0	0	0	10	2	0	0	0	9
1945–46	Boston Olympics	EAHL	11	1	2	3	2	—	—	—	—	—
1945–46	Seattle Ironmen	PCHL	17	0	0	0	20	—	—	—	—	—
1945–46	Fort Worth Rangers	USHL	26	1	1	2	26	—	—	—	—	—
1946–47	Fort Worth Rangers	USHL	35	1	3	4	28	—	—	—	—	—
1947–48	Fort Worth Rangers	USHL	55	17	11	28	55	—	—	—	—	—
1948–49	Fort Worth Rangers	USHL	8	4	2	6	17	—	—	—	—	—
1948–49	Springfield Indians	AHL	50	7	18	25	61	3	1	1	2	0
1949–50	Kerrisdale Monarchs	WKHL	—	—	—	—	—	—	—	—	—	—
1950–51	Vancouver Canucks	PCHL	11	1	2	3	12	—	—	—	—	—
1950–51	Kerrisdale Monarchs	WKHL	34	11	26	37	69	5	5	3	8	0
1951–52	Vancouver Wheelers	VCIHL	32	18	14	32	26	—	—	—	—	—
USHL totals			124	23	17	40	126	5	0	2	2	0
NHL totals			2	0	0	0	0	—	—	—	—	—
