= Bob Attwell =

American-born Canadian ice hockey player

- Born: December 26, 1959 (age 66) Spokane, Washington, U.S.
- Height: 6 ft 0 in (183 cm)
- Weight: 192 lb (87 kg; 13 st 10 lb)
- Position: Right wing
- Shot: Right
- Played for: Colorado Rockies
- NHL draft: 106th overall, 1979; Colorado Rockies
- Playing career: 1979–1990

Robert Allan Attwell (born December 26, 1959) was an American-born Canadian professional ice hockey player who played 22 games in the National Hockey League with the Colorado Rockies between 1979 and 1981.

== Personal life ==
Attwell was born in Spokane, Washington, but grew up in Toronto, Ontario.

His father, Ron Attwell, and two of his uncles (Bill McCreary Sr. and Keith McCreary) also played in the NHL. Bill McCreary Jr., his cousin, alo played in the NHL.

== Career statistics ==
=== Regular season and playoffs ===
			Regular season					Playoffs
Season	Team	League	GP	G	A	Pts	PIM	GP	G	A	Pts	PIM
1975–76	Bramalea Blues	MJBHL	50	32	28	60	12	—	—	—	—	—
1976–77	Peterborough Petes	OMJHL	64	18	25	43	10	4	1	2	3	2
1977–78	Peterborough Petes	OMJHL	68	23	43	66	32	21	6	12	18	4
1978–79	Peterborough Petes	OMJHL	68	32	61	93	39	19	8	8	16	8
1978–79	Peterborough Petes	M-Cup	—	—	—	—	—	5	3	0	3	2
1979–80	Colorado Rockies	NHL	7	1	1	2	0	—	—	—	—	—
1979–80	Fort Worth Texans	CHL	74	26	35	61	18	15	4	5	9	4
1980–81	Colorado Rockies	NHL	15	0	4	4	0	—	—	—	—	—
1980–81	Fort Worth Texans	CHL	60	13	18	31	30	5	1	2	3	0
1981–82	Fort Worth Texans	CHL	79	31	36	67	66	—	—	—	—	—
1982–83	Moncton Alpines	AHL	74	14	19	33	31	—	—	—	—	—
1983–84	Fort Wayne Komets	IHL	70	25	35	60	22	6	1	1	2	0
1984–85	EC Bad Tölz	GER-2	36	42	18	60	54	18	12	11	23	20
1985–86	Berliner SC Preussen	GER-2	36	32	32	64	78	18	16	12	28	20
1986–87	Berliner SC Preussen	GER-2	38	37	33	70	47	16	14	9	23	10
1987–88	Berliner SC Preussen	GER	23	8	5	13	6	—	—	—	—	—
1987–88	Heilbronner EC	GER-2	12	10	8	18	6	—	—	—	—	—
1988–89	Heilbronner EC	GER-2	36	40	37	77	27	13	9	7	16	9
1989–90	Augsburger EV	GER-2	19	11	13	24	12	—	—	—	—	—
GER-2 totals			177	172	141	313	224	65	53	49	90	59
NHL totals			22	1	5	6	0	0	0	0	0	0
