= Ron Attwell =

Canadian ice hockey player (1935–2017)

- Born: February 9, 1935 Humber Summit, Ontario, Canada
- Died: December 4, 2017 (aged 82) Huntsville, Ontario, Canada
- Height: 6 ft 0 in (183 cm)
- Weight: 185 lb (84 kg; 13 st 3 lb)
- Position: Right wing
- Shot: Right
- Played for: St. Louis Blues; New York Rangers
- Playing career: 1954–1970

Ronald Allan Attwell (February 9, 1935 – December 4, 2017) was a Canadian professional ice hockey player who played 22 games in the National Hockey League with the St. Louis Blues and New York Rangers during the 1967–68 season. The rest of his career, which lasted from 1954 to 1970, was spent in the minor leagues.

When the Montreal Junior Canadiens signed Attwell, his transfer was not approved by the Ontario Hockey Association where he played minor ice hockey. This resulted in the Canadian Amateur Hockey Association suspending the Quebec Amateur Hockey Association for issuing a player's card to Attwell at the behest of team manager Sam Pollock.

Attwell was the father of Bob Attwell. His nephew is Bill McCreary Jr.

== Career statistics ==
=== Regular season and playoffs ===
			Regular season					Playoffs
Season	Team	League	GP	G	A	Pts	PIM	GP	G	A	Pts	PIM
1952–53	Montreal Junior Canadiens	QJHL	9	3	2	5	6	3	0	1	1	4
1953–54	Montreal Junior Canadiens	QJHL	50	15	27	42	17	8	1	0	1	4
1953–54	Montreal Royals	QSHL	1	0	0	0	0	—	—	—	—	—
1954–55	Montreal Junior Canadiens	QJHL	42	14	27	41	35	5	2	5	7	8
1954–55	Providence Reds	AHL	2	0	1	1	2	—	—	—	—	—
1955–56	Providence Reds	AHL	44	7	14	21	23	1	0	0	0	2
1956–57	Trois-Rivières Lions	QSHL	67	15	21	36	27	4	0	1	1	2
1957–58	Shawinigan Falls Cataractes	QSHL	54	12	27	39	29	14	9	8	17	6
1957–58	Rochester Americans	AHL	6	1	0	1	2	—	—	—	—	—
1958–59	Spokane Spokes	WHL	34	7	10	17	4	4	1	1	2	4
1958–59	Chicoutimi Sagueneens	QSHL	25	5	16	21	4	—	—	—	—	—
1959–60	Spokane Comets	WHL	70	20	34	54	41	—	—	—	—	—
1960–61	Cleveland Barons	AHL	66	23	35	58	37	4	2	1	3	0
1961–62	Cleveland Barons	AHL	70	28	55	83	43	6	2	2	4	4
1962–63	Quebec Aces	AHL	69	14	28	42	26	—	—	—	—	—
1963–64	Cleveland Barons	AHL	72	30	38	68	32	9	1	5	6	2
1964–65	Cleveland Barons	AHL	72	14	49	63	43	—	—	—	—	—
1965–66	Cleveland Barons	AHL	68	23	25	48	64	4	1	0	1	2
1966–67	Cleveland Barons	AHL	70	24	37	61	46	5	1	4	5	10
1967–68	St. Louis Blues	NHL	18	1	7	8	6	—	—	—	—	—
1967–68	New York Rangers	NHL	4	0	0	0	2	—	—	—	—	—
1967–68	Buffalo Bisons	AHL	35	7	11	18	4	5	1	2	3	4
1968–69	Buffalo Bisons	AHL	74	19	41	60	59	4	1	1	2	2
1969–70	Buffalo Bisons	AHL	71	9	39	48	28	7	2	0	2	2
1969–70	Omaha Knights	CHL	—	—	—	—	—	1	0	0	0	0
AHL totals			719	199	373	572	409	45	11	15	26	28
NHL totals			22	1	7	8	8	—	—	—	—	—
