= Sutter (surname) =

- Pronunciation: SUH-ter
- Language: German

Origin
- Meaning: shoemaker
- Region of origin: Austria, Southern Germany, Switzerland

Other names
- Variant forms: Suter, Sauter or Sautter

Sutter is a surname. According to one historical record, one original spelling was Sotter.

== People with this surname ==
- Alain Sutter (born 1968), Swiss footballer
- Allan Sutter (1914–1988), American marine, Navy Cross recipient
- Beat Sutter (born 1962), Swiss footballer
- Bruce Sutter (1953–2022), American baseball player
- Herb Sutter, computer programmer
- Joe Sutter (1921–2016), American aerospace engineer
- John Augustus Sutter, Sr. (1803–1880), Californian gold rush figure
- John Augustus Sutter, Jr. (1826–1897), American diplomat, and founder of Sacramento, California
- Joshua Caleb Sutter (born 1981), American neo-Nazi
- Karin Keller-Sutter, Swiss politician
- Kurt Sutter, American screenwriter and director
- Manuel Sutter (born 1991), Austrian footballer
- Merlin Sutter (born 1986), Swiss musician
- Nicola Sutter (born 1995), Swiss footballer
- René Sutter (born 1966), Swiss footballer
- Ryan Sutter (born 1974), reality TV contestant, The Bachelorette
- Ueli Sutter (1947–2025), Swiss cyclist

=== Sutter family (sportspeople) ===
- Sutter family, Canadian family of hockey players
  - Brent Sutter (born 1962), Canadian hockey player
    - Brandon Sutter (born 1989), hockey player, son of Brent
  - Brian Sutter (born 1956), Canadian hockey player
    - Shaun Sutter (born 1980), Canadian hockey player and coach, son of Brian
  - Darryl Sutter (born 1958), Canadian hockey player
    - Brett Sutter (born 1987), Canadian hockey player, son of Darryl
  - Duane Sutter (born 1960), Canadian hockey player
  - Rich Sutter (born 1963), Canadian hockey player
  - Ron Sutter (born 1963), Canadian hockey player

== Fictional characters ==
- Rebecca Sutter, fictional character played by Katie Findlay (List of How to Get Away with Murder characters)

== See also ==
- Sutter (disambiguation) (other meanings)
