= Brett Sutter =

Canadian ice hockey player (born 1987)

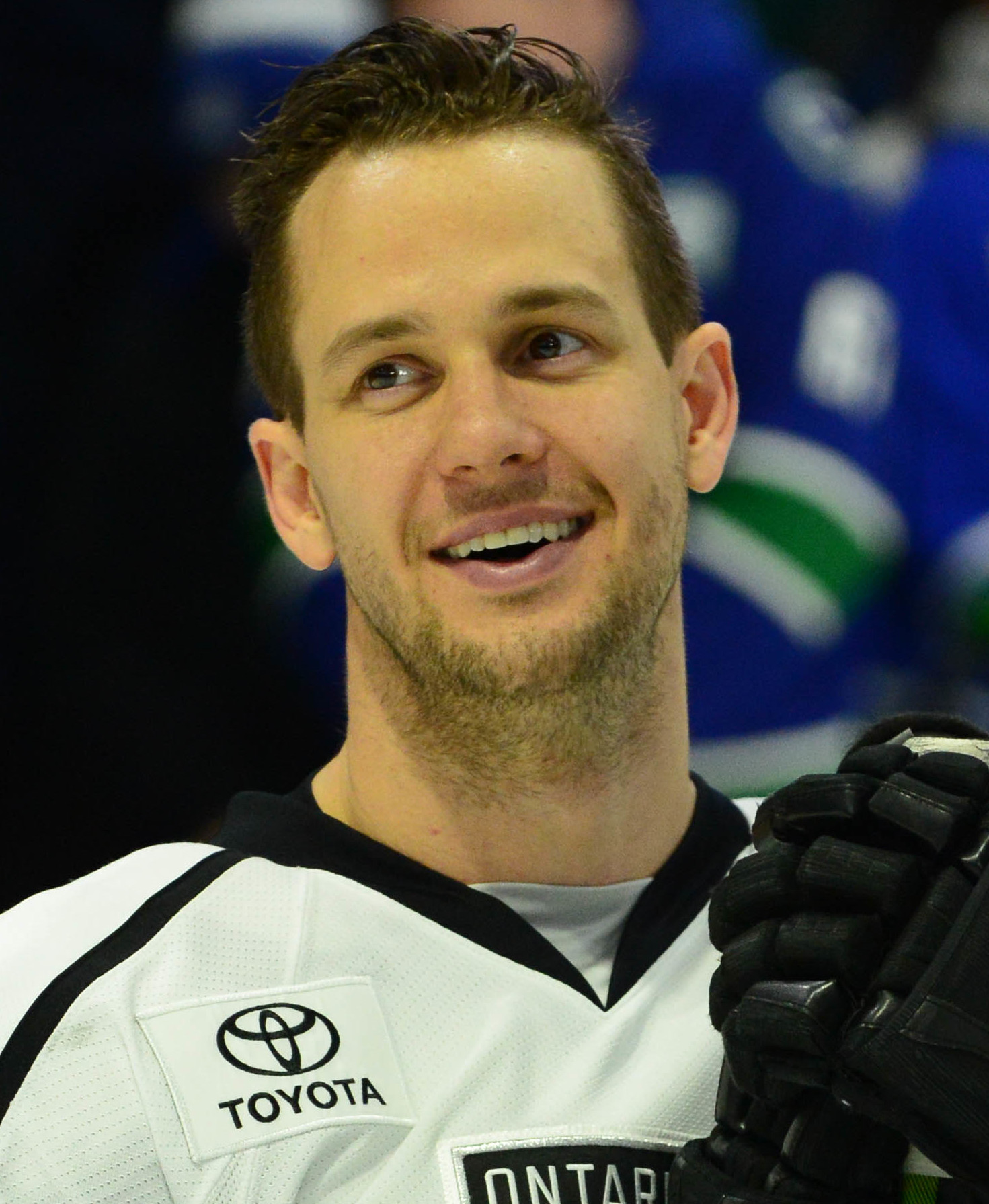
- Sutter with the Ontario Reign in 2018
- Born: June 2, 1987 (age 39) Viking, Alberta, Canada
- Height: 6 ft 0 in (183 cm)
- Weight: 192 lb (87 kg; 13 st 10 lb)
- Position: Centre
- Shot: Left
- Played for: Calgary Flames; Carolina Hurricanes; Minnesota Wild
- NHL draft: 179th overall, 2005; Calgary Flames
- Playing career: 2007–2024
- Coaching career: 2024–present

Brett Darryl Sutter (born June 2, 1987) is a Canadian former professional ice hockey player and current head coach for the Calgary Wranglers of the American Hockey League (AHL). Sutter was drafted by the Calgary Flames in the sixth round (179th overall) of the 2005 NHL entry draft. He made his National Hockey League (NHL) debut for the Flames during the 2008–09 season, scoring a goal in his first game. He is the son of former Calgary Flames head coach Darryl Sutter, and one of nine members of the famous Sutter family to play in the NHL. Sutter played 1,090 games in the AHL before concluding his career.

== Playing career ==
As a youth, Sutter played in the 2001 Quebec International Pee-Wee Hockey Tournament with the San Jose Sharks minor ice hockey team.

=== Junior ===
Sutter played four Western Hockey League (WHL) seasons with the Kootenay Ice and Red Deer Rebels between 2003 and 2007. During his time in Red Deer, he played with his cousin Brandon, and was coached by his uncle Brent Sutter. He was the Rebels' team captain in his final season of junior in 2006–07, and posted a career high 28 goals.

=== Professional ===
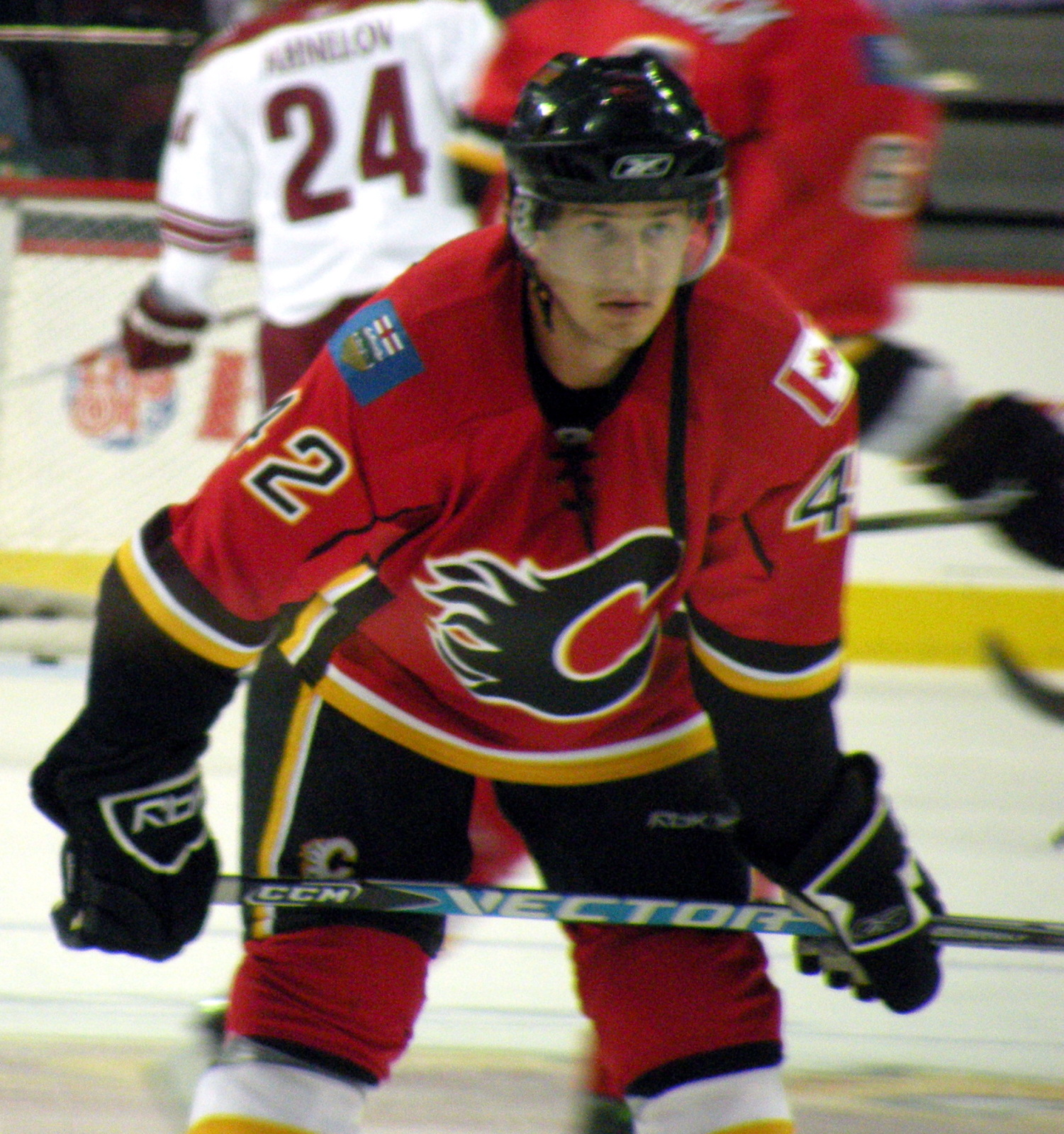
Sutter playing for the Calgary Flames

Sutter was drafted by the Calgary Flames in the sixth round (179th overall) of the 2005 NHL entry draft. At the time his father Darryl Sutter was the General manager of the Flames.

He turned professional in 2007–08. Sutter was one of the Flames' final cuts prior to the season, and was assigned to their American Hockey League (AHL) affiliate, the Quad City Flames, where he recorded four goals and ten points in 75 games. Sutter earned more ice time throughout the season as he adapted to the speed of the professional game. Sutter returned to Quad City for the start of the 2008–09 AHL season. He recorded one goal and six assists in 28 games prior to joining the Flames.

Sutter was recalled by the Flames on December 22, 2008, from Quad City, in a move that generated interest as his father was the Flames general manager. "Everybody makes a big deal about his last name, but there's been lots (of Sutters) before him and will be ones after him," Darryl Sutter said. The Flames stated that he was recalled on merit, and to fill a specific role with the team. He made his NHL debut on December 23, 2008, against the Anaheim Ducks, and scored a goal while being named the game's third star. Sutter played three games with the Flames before being returned to Quad City.

Though he spent the majority of 2009–10 with the Abbotsford Heat of the AHL, Sutter appeared in ten NHL games with the Flames that season. He stuck with the Flames out of training camp as an extra forward to begin the 2010–11 NHL season; however he was a healthy scratch for most games, dressing for only 4 of the Flames' first 16 games. On November 11, he was arrested in Scottsdale, Arizona after allegedly punching a cab driver outside of a bar the night before the Flames' were to play the Phoenix Coyotes. Less than a week later, he and Ian White were traded to the Carolina Hurricanes for Anton Babchuk and Tom Kostopoulos.

Immediately following his trade from Calgary to Carolina, Sutter was assigned to the Hurricanes' top AHL affiliate, the Charlotte Checkers for the remainder of the season. In the following 2011–12 season, on October 6, 2011, he was named the Checkers team captain. Sutter would play the majority of his four-year tenure with the Hurricanes with the Checkers.

Sutter was signed as a free agent by the Minnesota Wild on July 1, 2014, on a two-year, two-way contract.

During his second season within the Wild, Sutter was included in a trade deadline deal on February 29, 2016, to the Los Angeles Kings, coached by his father, and their AHL affiliate, the Ontario Reign, in return for right winger Scott Sabourin.

Despite not being offered a contract with the Kings in the off-season, Sutter opted to remain in the organization by signing a one-year AHL deal with the Reign on July 1, 2016.

Sutter played seven seasons with the Ontario Reign, serving as captain for five years, before returning to his home province in Calgary, Alberta to sign an AHL contract as a free agent for the inaugural season of the Calgary Wranglers on August 3, 2022. Sutter would serve as the first captain of the Wranglers for both of his seasons with the team.

Following 17 professional seasons, Sutter announced his retirement from professional hockey on July 15, 2024. He was immediately named as an assistant coach to remain within the Calgary Wranglers organization.

== Family ==
Upon making his NHL debut on December 23, 2008, Brett became the eighth member of the Sutter family to play in the NHL. Along with his father, Darryl, his uncles Brent, Brian, Duane, Rich and Ron all played in the NHL, while his cousin Brandon, who most recently played for the Vancouver Canucks. Another cousin, Shaun, was also a draft pick of the Flames in 1998, and later became an assistant coach of the Regina Pats of the Western Hockey League. Two of his other cousins, Brody and Lukas, also played in the Western Hockey League and have been drafted into the NHL.

Brett's selection by the Flames, 179th overall, was coincidentally the same spot at which his father was drafted. Darryl was claimed by the Chicago Blackhawks, 179th overall, in the 1978 NHL entry draft.

Brett is the middle child of Darryl and Wanda Sutter. He has an older sister (Jessica) and younger brother (Christopher).

Brett is married to Erin Sutter and they have three children together: daughters Olivia and Charlotte, and son Bo.

== Career statistics ==
			Regular season					Playoffs
Season	Team	League	GP	G	A	Pts	PIM	GP	G	A	Pts	PIM
2003–04	Kootenay Ice	WHL	44	5	7	12	26	4	0	0	0	4
2004–05	Kootenay Ice	WHL	70	8	11	19	70	16	1	2	3	16
2005–06	Kootenay Ice	WHL	16	8	7	15	21	—	—	—	—	—
2005–06	Red Deer Rebels	WHL	57	9	26	35	80	—	—	—	—	—
2006–07	Red Deer Rebels	WHL	67	28	29	57	77	7	3	4	7	11
2007–08	Quad City Flames	AHL	75	4	6	10	63	—	—	—	—	—
2008–09	Quad City Flames	AHL	71	10	15	25	50	—	—	—	—	—
2008–09	Calgary Flames	NHL	4	1	0	1	2	—	—	—	—	—
2009–10	Abbotsford Heat	AHL	66	9	15	24	69	13	4	7	11	20
2009–10	Calgary Flames	NHL	10	0	0	0	5	—	—	—	—	—
2010–11	Calgary Flames	NHL	4	0	1	1	5	—	—	—	—	—
2010–11	Charlotte Checkers	AHL	60	9	12	21	84	16	4	10	14	15
2010–11	Carolina Hurricanes	NHL	1	0	0	0	0	—	—	—	—	—
2011–12	Charlotte Checkers	AHL	63	13	16	29	58	—	—	—	—	—
2011–12	Carolina Hurricanes	NHL	15	0	3	3	11	—	—	—	—	—
2012–13	Charlotte Checkers	AHL	70	19	29	48	62	5	0	0	0	0
2012–13	Carolina Hurricanes	NHL	3	0	0	0	4	—	—	—	—	—
2013–14	Carolina Hurricanes	NHL	17	1	1	2	9	—	—	—	—	—
2013–14	Charlotte Checkers	AHL	62	15	29	44	69	—	—	—	—	—
2014–15	Iowa Wild	AHL	71	12	17	29	37	—	—	—	—	—
2014–15	Minnesota Wild	NHL	6	0	3	3	4	—	—	—	—	—
2015–16	Iowa Wild	AHL	57	4	10	14	37	—	—	—	—	—
2015–16	Ontario Reign	AHL	17	5	2	7	25	5	0	1	1	2
2016–17	Ontario Reign	AHL	66	18	18	36	52	5	1	1	2	2
2017–18	Ontario Reign	AHL	68	15	19	34	64	4	0	2	2	2
2018–19	Ontario Reign	AHL	67	21	24	45	47	—	—	—	—	—
2019–20	Ontario Reign	AHL	57	10	16	26	35	—	—	—	—	—
2020–21	Ontario Reign	AHL	39	4	9	13	23	1	0	0	0	5
2021–22	Ontario Reign	AHL	65	8	11	19	38	5	1	0	1	0
2022–23	Calgary Wranglers	AHL	70	14	15	29	49	9	1	1	2	2
2023–24	Calgary Wranglers	AHL	46	8	2	10	31	6	0	0	0	2
NHL totals			60	2	8	10	40	—	—	—	—	—
AHL totals			1,090	198	265	463	893	69	11	22	33	50

== Awards and honours ==
Award	Year
AHL
All-Star Game	2018
Fred T. Hunt Memorial Award	2019
