= Sutter =

Sutter may refer to:

== People ==
- Sutter (surname), a list of people with this name
- John Augustus Sutter, Sr. (1803–1880), Californian pioneer and founder of Sutter's Fort
  - John Augustus Sutter, Jr. (1826–1897), his son, a U.S. consul to Acapulco, Mexico and the founder and planner of the City of Sacramento, California
- Sutter family, a Canadian family that is one of the most famous in the National Hockey League

== Place names ==
The following places are in the United States; some were named after John Sutter, Sr.:

- Sutter, California, in Sutter County
- Sutter, Hancock County, Illinois, unincorporated community
- Sutter, Tazewell County, Illinois, unincorporated community
- Sutter Avenue (disambiguation), stations of the New York City Subway in Brooklyn
- Sutter Basin, in the Sacramento Valley in California
- Sutter Buttes, eroded volcanic lava domes in California
- Sutter County, California, along the Sacramento River in the Central Valley
- Sutter Creek, California, a city in Amador County, California, United States
- Sutter Hill, California, unincorporated community in Amador County, California
- Sutter Pointe, California, proposed planned community in Sutter County
- Sutterville, California, a former settlement in Sacramento County, California
- Sutter's Fort, state-protected park in Sacramento, California
- Sutter's Mill, sawmill owned by 19th century pioneer John Sutter

== See also ==
- Sutter Health, not-for-profit health system in Northern California, headquartered in Sacramento
- Sutter Home Winery, large independent family-run winery in the United States
- Sutter's Gold, 1936 fictionalized film version of the events leading to the California Gold Rush of 1849
- DeSutter
- Suter (disambiguation)
- Suttner (disambiguation)
