= Brody Sutter =

Canadian ice hockey player (born 1991)

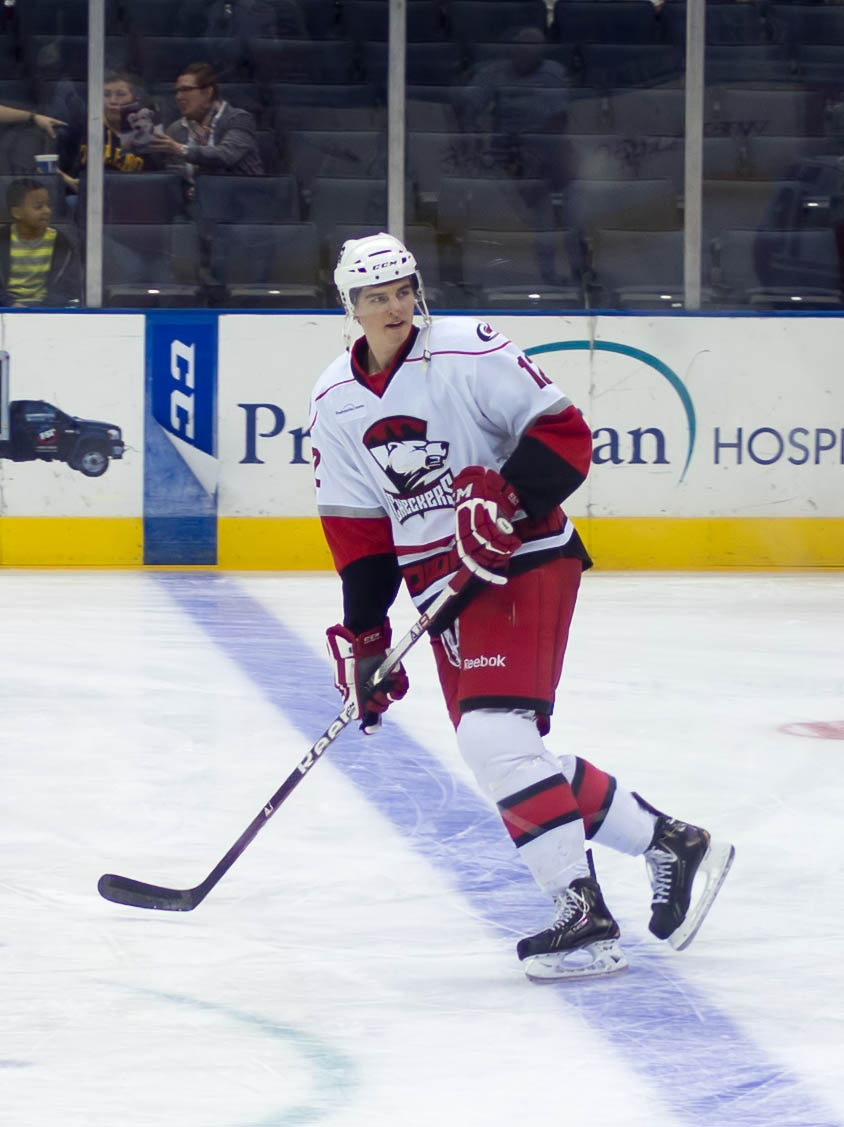
- Sutter with the Charlotte Checkers in 2013
- Born: September 26, 1991 (age 34) Viking, Alberta, Canada
- Height: 6 ft 5 in (196 cm)
- Weight: 203 lb (92 kg; 14 st 7 lb)
- Position: Centre
- Shot: Right
- Played for: Carolina Hurricanes; Vaasan Sport; Iserlohn Roosters; Vienna Capitals
- NHL draft: 193rd overall, 2011; Carolina Hurricanes
- Playing career: 2012–2022

Brody Sutter (born September 26, 1991) is a Canadian former professional ice hockey forward who played in the National Hockey League (NHL) with the Carolina Hurricanes. He was drafted by the Hurricanes, 193rd overall in the 2011 NHL entry draft.

== Playing career ==
As a youth, Sutter played in the 2004 Quebec International Pee-Wee Hockey Tournament with the Florida Junior Panthers minor ice hockey team. He later played with the Lethbridge Hurricanes of the Western Hockey League, from 2008 to 2012. Before signing a three-year entry-level contract with the Carolina Hurricanes on June 1, 2012.

In the early stages of the 2014–15 season, Sutter was recalled from the Checkers to the Hurricanes. He made his NHL debut with the Hurricanes in a 2–1 shootout defeat to the New York Rangers at Madison Square Garden on October 16, 2014.

Approaching the beginning of the 2016–17 season, Sutter was traded by the Hurricanes to the Florida Panthers in exchange for Connor Brickley on October 11, 2016. He was directly assigned to inaugural AHL affiliate, the Springfield Thunderbirds, to play out his contract. Sutter was limited through injury to just 18 games with the Thunderbirds, contributing 9 points.

As a free agent from the Panthers, Sutter agreed to a one-year AHL contract with the Manitoba Moose on July 5, 2017. In the 2017–18 season, Sutter made 58 appearances with the Moose contributing with 8 goals and 18 points.

Sutter left North America after six professional seasons, agreeing to a one-year deal with Finnish club, Vaasan Sport of the Liiga on August 2, 2018. In the 2018–19 season, Sutter added a physical presence and forward depth to Sport, posting 9 goals and 21 points through 45 games, while failing to qualify for the post-season.

As a free agent, Sutter continued his career in Europe, agreeing to a one-year contract with German club, Iserlohn Roosters of the DEL on May 8, 2019. He played with the Roosters for two seasons before signing with the Vienna Capitals for the 2021–2022 season.

== Personal life ==
Sutter is a member of the Sutter family, the son of Duane Sutter. Brody overlapped with his cousins in the Carolina organization; Brett from late in the 2011–12 season until Brody's departure during the 2013–2014 season, the two played together with Carolina's AHL affiliate the Charlotte Checkers. Brody, Brett and cousin Brandon were briefly in the organization together during the 2011–2012 season but Brandon was traded in the offseason to Pittsburgh.

== Career statistics ==
			Regular season					Playoffs
Season	Team	League	GP	G	A	Pts	PIM	GP	G	A	Pts	PIM
2007–08	Calgary Buffaloes	AMHL	32	8	11	19	24	12	4	6	10	4
2008–09	Saskatoon Blades	WHL	18	0	2	2	4	—	—	—	—	—
2008–09	Lethbridge Hurricanes	WHL	30	4	3	7	7	10	0	0	0	2
2009–10	Lethbridge Hurricanes	WHL	72	5	9	14	42	—	—	—	—	—
2010–11	Lethbridge Hurricanes	WHL	46	18	24	42	35	—	—	—	—	—
2011–12	Lethbridge Hurricanes	WHL	65	30	30	60	49	—	—	—	—	—
2011–12	Charlotte Checkers	AHL	4	1	0	1	0	—	—	—	—	—
2012–13	Florida Everblades	ECHL	37	8	8	16	13	—	—	—	—	—
2012–13	Charlotte Checkers	AHL	23	2	3	5	13	5	2	3	5	2
2013–14	Charlotte Checkers	AHL	69	8	20	28	29	—	—	—	—	—
2014–15	Charlotte Checkers	AHL	45	12	13	25	17	—	—	—	—	—
2014–15	Carolina Hurricanes	NHL	4	0	0	0	0	—	—	—	—	—
2015–16	Charlotte Checkers	AHL	70	13	11	24	37	—	—	—	—	—
2015–16	Carolina Hurricanes	NHL	8	0	0	0	0	—	—	—	—	—
2016–17	Springfield Thunderbirds	AHL	19	4	5	9	6	—	—	—	—	—
2017–18	Manitoba Moose	AHL	58	8	10	18	22	9	0	0	0	0
2018–19	Vaasan Sport	Liiga	45	9	12	21	10	—	—	—	—	—
2019–20	Iserlohn Roosters	DEL	47	12	7	19	22	—	—	—	—	—
2020–21	Iserlohn Roosters	DEL	24	9	3	12	4	—	—	—	—	—
2021–22	Vienna Capitals	ICEHL	23	12	8	20	8	7	1	1	2	6
NHL totals			12	0	0	0	0	—	—	—	—	—
