= DeSutter =

- Pronunciation: dee-SUH-ter
- Language: Dutch

Origin
- Meaning: shoemaker
- Region of origin: Flanders

Other names
- Variant forms: De Sutter, DeSoto, De Zutter, DeZuter, DeZutter
- 'De' means 'The'

DeSutter is a surname derived from the Latin word sutor (shoemaker) and is widely used in Flanders. One could translate DeSutter as 'The Shoemaker'. The first record of the name is from the 13th century in Flanders. DeSutters originated in the northwestern parts of Belgium in the Ghent (Gent - East Flanders) area near the English Channel, as well as Northwestern France. Variants include De Sutter, DeSoto, DeZuter, DeZutter and De Zutter.

A majority of the DeSutters in United States are descended from people who moved there in the mid to late 19th and early 20th century. Most settled in the upper plain states of the Midwest (Minnesota, Iowa, Illinois, Wisconsin and the Dakotas) for the vast farming lands as well as Catholic mission work.

Notable people with the surname include:

- Chris DeZutter, American guitar player, Trenchmouth
- Paula A. DeSutter, American politician
- Petra De Sutter, Belgian gynaecologist and politician
- Tom De Sutter, Belgian football player
- Wayne DeSutter, American footballer, Buffalo Bills

== See also ==
- Sutor, ne ultra crepidam, a Latin expression featuring the word from which the name is derived
- Sutter (surname)

== Sources ==
- Minneota Chamber of Commerce
- Ellis Island Heritage Foundation
