= Apps family =

The Apps family, originally from Ontario, Canada, has had three generations participate in ice hockey. Syl Apps and Syl Apps, Jr. represent the first two generations. The third generation includes a daughter Gillian Apps, and a son Syl Apps III. The third generation competed in the NCAA. Collectively, the Apps siblings played over 200 NCAA ice hockey games. In addition, the third generation has another sibling, Amy. She was a former member of the Canadian National women's soccer team.

== First generation ==
Syl Apps played the centre position with the Toronto Maple Leafs for his entire professional hockey career. The jersey number he wore with the Maple Leafs was 10. He was the winner of the first Calder Memorial Trophy in 1937, and the 1942 Lady Byng Memorial Trophy. Apps served as the Maple Leafs captain during the first National Hockey League All-Star Game October 13, 1947, at Maple Leaf Gardens. He also played for an all-star team competing in Montreal on October 29, 1939, to raise money for Babe Siebert's family.

== Second generation ==
Syl Apps, Jr. was originally drafted by the New York Rangers in the 1964 NHL Amateur Draft but did not make his NHL debut until 1970. That season, he was traded to the Pittsburgh Penguins, and emerged as one of the franchise's first stars. Between 1973 and 1976, Apps centered the Century Line with left wing Lowell MacDonald and right wing Jean Pronovost. He led the team in scoring three times and was named to play in the 1975 All-Star Game. Apps set a team record with 59 points in 1971-72, broke his own record in 1972-73 with 85 points, and tied that in 1973-74. Apps' best season was 1975-76, when he scored 32 goals and 67 assists for 99 points, although this was not a team record, as during this season Pierre Larouche scored 111 points and Jean Pronovost tallied 104. At the time of his retirement, he was the Penguins' career assist leader and second in goals and points.

== Third generation ==
=== Syl III ===
Syl Apps III was a four-time letter winner for the Princeton Tigers. He was also Tigers captain in the 1998–99 season. As of the 2009-10 Princeton season, Apps is 35th on the Tigers all-time scoring list. For his career, Apps played in 122 games, scored 30 goals and registered 41 assists for a career total of 71. On March 21, 1998, Apps scored the game-winning goal that ended the third longest Princeton game. The game lasted 80:48, and Princeton defeated Clarkson by a score of 5–4 to claim the ECAC Championship. Unlike his father and grandfather, Apps III did not play in the National Hockey League. Apps III would play in the American Hockey League with the St. John's Maple Leafs, Norfolk Admirals, and Springfield Falcons. He would also play in the East Coast Hockey League with the Jackson Bandits, and the Trenton Titans. As a member of the Trenton Titans, Apps was the team captain.

=== Gillian ===
Gillian Apps was a member of the Dartmouth Big Green women's ice hockey program, competing in ECAC women's ice hockey. She is also a member of the Canada women's national ice hockey team, winning gold medals at the 2004 and 2007 World Ice Hockey Championships, and silver medals in that event in 2005, 2008, and 2009. She is a winner of gold medals with Team Canada at the 2006 Winter Olympics in Turin, Italy, and the 2010 Winter Olympics in Vancouver, British Columbia, Canada. In addition, she appeared in the championship game of the 2010 Clarkson Cup. On April 13, 2010, Apps was named to the ECAC women's ice hockey All-Decade team.

=== Amy ===
Amy Apps (born May 8, 1978) competed for McMaster University and was part of the West Division All-Star teams in 1998 and 1999, respectively. She made her first appearance for the Canadian national women's soccer team in a 3–1 loss to Germany on September 1, 2005. In 2004, Apps won a W-League championship with the Vancouver Whitecaps. Apps participated at the 2007 International Soccer Festival in Alabama and contributed to the Canadian development team claiming first place. With the national team, Apps suffered from numerous injuries. She was struck with a neurological illness that left her bed-ridden for most of 2006. Apps sought relief with cranial sacral therapy. In 2007, she tore her ACL and was unable to compete in the XV Pan American Games.

== Career stats ==
		Regular season
Syl Apps (NHL)	1936–48	423	201	231	432	56
Syl Apps, Jr. (NHL)	1970–80	727	183	423	606	311
Syl Apps III (AHL)	1999–2002	134	12	15	27	160
Gillian Apps (Dartmouth)	2002–07	113	90	68	158	281

== See also ==
- Sutter family
