= Donald Sanderlin =

Canadian sports shooter

Personal information
- Born: 26 February 1933 Viking, Alberta, Canada
- Died: 9 January 2013 (aged 79)

Sport
- Sport: Sports shooting

Donald Sanderlin (26 February 1933 – 9 January 2013) was a Canadian sports shooter. He competed at the 1968 Summer Olympics and the 1972 Summer Olympics.
