= Suttner =

Suttner may refer to:

- 12799 von Suttner, an asteroid
- Andreas Suttner (1876–1953), Austrian fencer
- Bertha von Suttner (1843–1914), Austrian novelist and pacifist
- Kurt Suttner (born 1936), German choral conductor
- Markus Suttner, Austrian footballer
- Raymond Suttner

== See also ==
- Sutter (disambiguation)
