= Ron Sutter =

Canadian ice hockey player

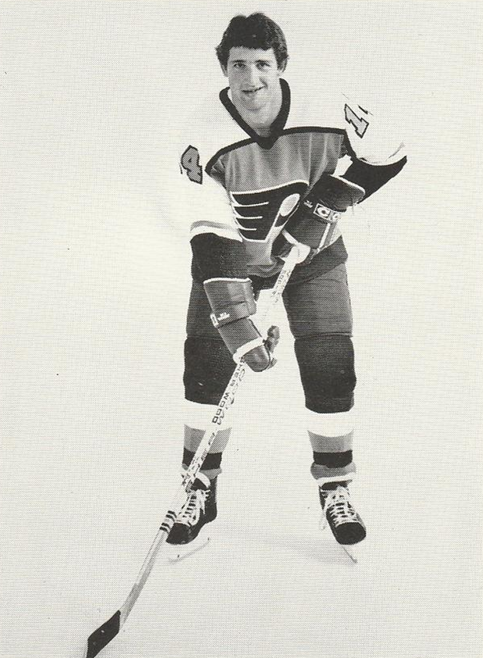
- Born: December 2, 1963 (age 62) Viking, Alberta, Canada
- Height: 6 ft 0 in (183 cm)
- Weight: 180 lb (82 kg; 12 st 12 lb)
- Position: Centre
- Shot: Right
- Played for: Philadelphia Flyers; St. Louis Blues; Quebec Nordiques; New York Islanders; Boston Bruins; San Jose Sharks; Calgary Flames
- National team: Canada
- NHL draft: 4th overall, 1982; Philadelphia Flyers
- Playing career: 1982–2001

Ronald T. Sutter (born December 2, 1963) is a Canadian former professional ice hockey player. He is the Player Development coach for the Calgary Flames of the National Hockey League (NHL). He is the brother of Brian, Brent, Darryl, Duane and Rich Sutter, all of whom played in the National Hockey League (NHL). He is the twin brother of Rich and was the last Sutter brother to retire from the NHL.

== Playing career ==
Ron Sutter was drafted 4th overall by the Philadelphia Flyers in the 1982 NHL entry draft, the same draft that saw his twin brother, Rich, get drafted 10th overall by the Pittsburgh Penguins. Ron and Rich both played on the Lethbridge Broncos in the WHL, and together they led that team to the Memorial Cup in 1983. Rich would only play 9 games for the Penguins after Junior, before being traded to Ron's Flyers. The three seasons that the pair played on the same team in Philadelphia were three of the best years of Ron's career.

Ron played with the Flyers until the 1991–92 season, when he was traded to the St. Louis Blues along with Murray Baron, for Dan Quinn and Rod Brind'Amour. Moreover, Rich was playing on the Blues at that time, and the two played two more seasons together. After that, Ron became somewhat of a journeyman in the NHL, playing for St. Louis, the Quebec Nordiques, New York Islanders, Boston Bruins, and San Jose Sharks within 4 seasons.

Sutter played 4 seasons with the Sharks, being coached by older brother Darryl Sutter, but most of his offensive skills had eroded, and he primarily became a defensive centre. Sutter only averaged 10 points a season in San Jose. Sutter would finish off his career with the Calgary Flames, and retired in 2001.

After retiring, Sutter worked for several seasons as a scout for the Calgary Flames. In 2021, he departed from the team.

== Career statistics ==
=== Regular season and playoffs ===
			Regular season					Playoffs
Season	Team	League	GP	G	A	Pts	PIM	GP	G	A	Pts	PIM
1979–80	Red Deer Rustlers	AJHL	60	12	33	45	44	13	6	12	18	26
1980–81	Lethbridge Broncos	WHL	72	13	32	45	152	9	2	5	7	29
1981–82	Lethbridge Broncos	WHL	59	38	54	92	207	12	6	5	11	28
1982–83	Philadelphia Flyers	NHL	10	1	1	2	9	—	—	—	—	—
1982–83	Lethbridge Broncos	WHL	58	35	48	83	98	20	22	19	41	45
1982–83	Lethbridge Broncos	MC	—	—	—	—	—	3	2	2	4	4
1983–84	Philadelphia Flyers	NHL	79	19	32	51	101	3	0	0	0	22
1984–85	Philadelphia Flyers	NHL	73	16	29	45	94	19	4	8	12	28
1985–86	Philadelphia Flyers	NHL	75	18	42	60	159	5	0	2	2	10
1986–87	Philadelphia Flyers	NHL	39	10	17	27	69	16	1	7	8	12
1987–88	Philadelphia Flyers	NHL	69	8	25	33	146	7	0	1	1	26
1988–89	Philadelphia Flyers	NHL	55	26	22	48	80	19	1	9	10	51
1989–90	Philadelphia Flyers	NHL	75	22	26	48	104	—	—	—	—	—
1990–91	Philadelphia Flyers	NHL	80	17	28	45	92	—	—	—	—	—
1991–92	St. Louis Blues	NHL	68	19	27	46	91	6	1	3	4	8
1992–93	St. Louis Blues	NHL	59	12	15	27	99	—	—	—	—	—
1993–94	St. Louis Blues	NHL	36	6	12	18	46	—	—	—	—	—
1993–94	Quebec Nordiques	NHL	37	9	13	22	44	—	—	—	—	—
1994–95	New York Islanders	NHL	27	1	4	5	21	—	—	—	—	—
1995–96	Phoenix Roadrunners	IHL	25	6	13	19	28	—	—	—	—	—
1995–96	Boston Bruins	NHL	18	5	7	12	24	5	0	0	0	8
1996–97	San Jose Sharks	NHL	78	5	7	12	65	—	—	—	—	—
1997–98	San Jose Sharks	NHL	57	2	7	9	22	6	1	0	1	14
1998–99	San Jose Sharks	NHL	59	3	6	9	40	6	0	0	0	4
1999–2000	San Jose Sharks	NHL	78	5	6	11	34	12	0	2	2	10
2000–01	Calgary Flames	NHL	21	1	3	4	12	—	—	—	—	—
NHL totals			1,093	205	328	533	1,352	104	8	32	40	193

=== International ===
Year	Team	Event	GP	G	A	Pts	PIM
1990	Canada	WC	10	1	1	2	4

== See also ==
- Captain (ice hockey)
- List of NHL players with 1,000 games played
- Sutter family

Preceded by Steve Smith	Philadelphia Flyers' first-round draft pick 1982	Succeeded by Glen Seabrooke
Preceded by Dave Poulin	Philadelphia Flyers captain 1989–91	Succeeded by Rick Tocchet
