= Brent Sutter =

Canadian ice hockey player and coach (born 1962)

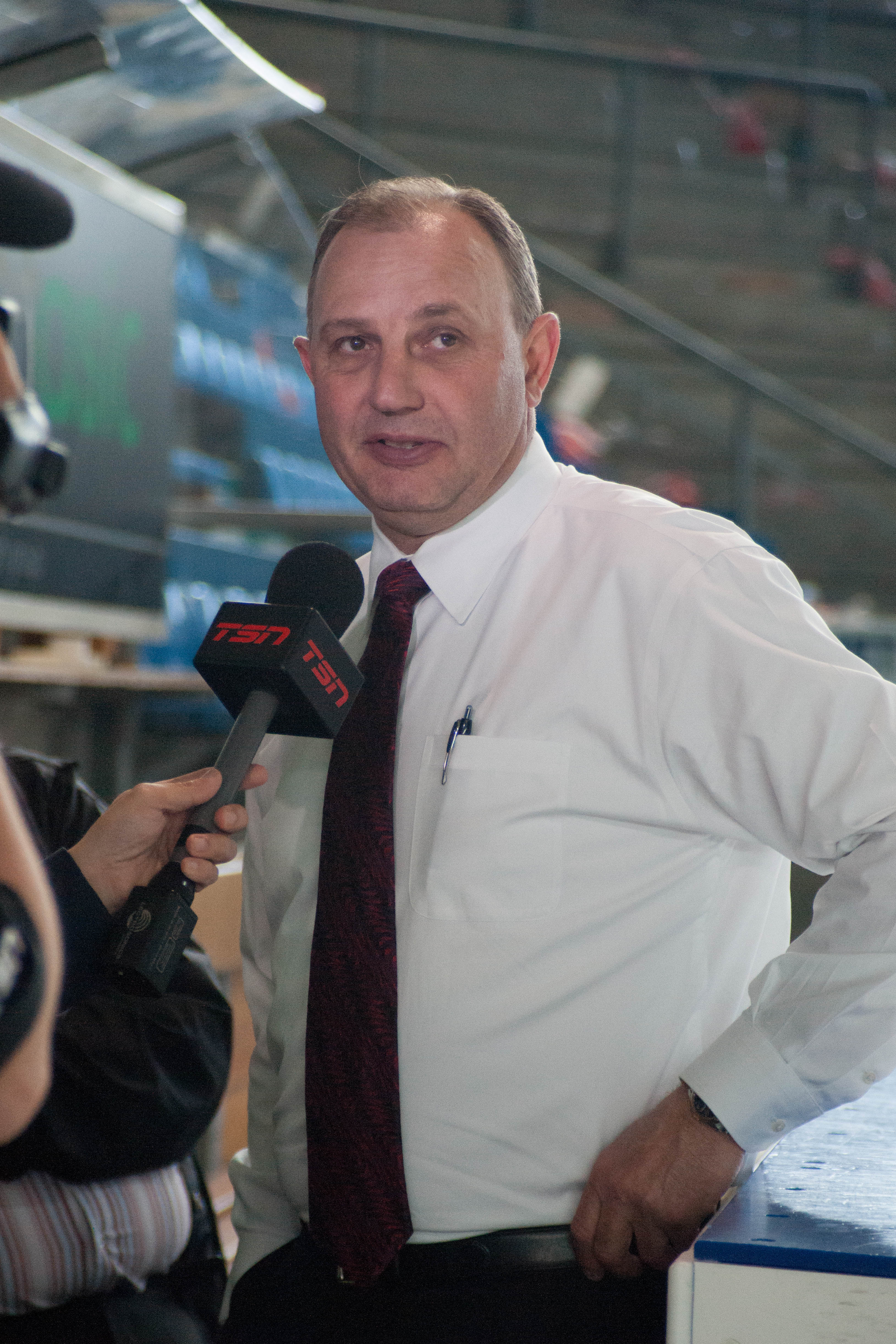
- Sutter in 2012
- Born: June 10, 1962 (age 64) Viking, Alberta, Canada
- Height: 6 ft 0 in (183 cm)
- Weight: 188 lb (85 kg; 13 st 6 lb)
- Position: Centre
- Shot: Right
- Played for: New York Islanders; Chicago Blackhawks
- National team: Canada
- NHL draft: 17th overall, 1980; New York Islanders
- Playing career: 1980–1998

Brent Colin Sutter (born June 10, 1962) is a Canadian former National Hockey League (NHL) player and former head coach of the New Jersey Devils and Calgary Flames. Selected by the New York Islanders 17th overall at the 1980 NHL entry draft, Sutter played over 1,000 games for the Islanders and Chicago Blackhawks during his 18-year career. Sutter won the Stanley Cup twice with the Islanders and was an All-Star. He represented Canada on numerous occasions, winning the Canada Cup three times.

After retiring as a player in 1998, Sutter bought the Red Deer Rebels of the Western Hockey League and served as the team's head coach and general manager for eight seasons, winning the Memorial Cup in 2001. He coached the Canadian junior team to gold medals at the 2005 and 2006 World Junior Hockey Championships, as well as winning the 2007 Super Series. Sutter compiled a 19–0–1 record in three years as the national junior team coach. He joined the New Jersey Devils as their head coach in 2007. He led the Devils to one division title in two seasons before leaving New Jersey to take on the same position in Calgary, working for brother Darryl, who was at the time the Flames' general manager.

He is a member of the Sutter family. He was one of six brothers, along with Brian, Darryl, Duane, Ron, and Rich, to play in the NHL. Brent and Duane played together for the Islanders when the team won the Stanley Cup in 1982 and 1983. Brent coached his son Brandon and nephew Brett while with Red Deer; both have also gone on to play in the NHL. His daughter Brooke played volleyball for Red Deer College and was a first team conference all star in 2013. Sutter was inducted into the New York Islanders Hall of Fame on January 18, 2025.

== Career ==
=== Playing career ===
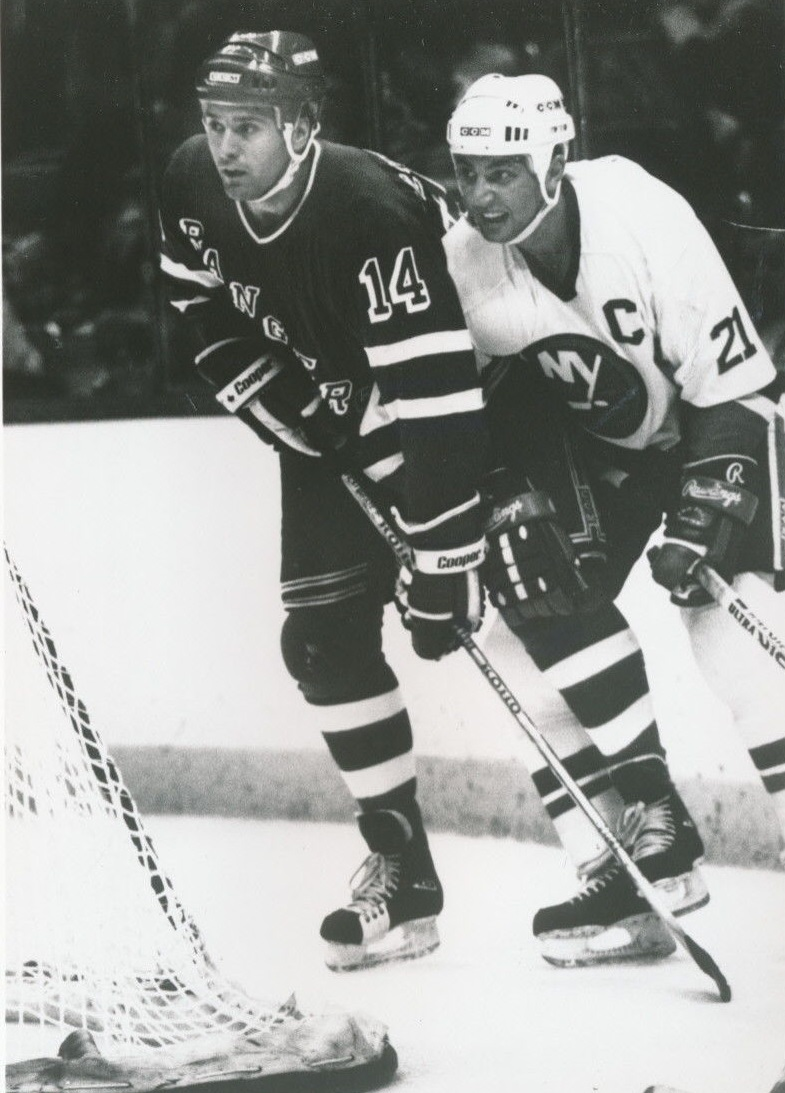
Sutter checking the Rangers' Doug Wickenheiser in 1988

Sutter played for the New York Islanders and the Chicago Blackhawks in the NHL, finishing with 829 points (363 goals, 466 assists) in 1111 regular season games and 74 points (30 goals, 44 assists) in 144 playoff games. In the 1980 NHL entry draft Sutter was the Islanders' first pick, 17th overall. His tenure with the Islanders lasted between 1981 and 1991. Sutter was on a team that entered the Stanley Cup Final in his first three seasons, winning in his first two. Sutter was named captain of the Islanders in 1987, when Denis Potvin relinquished the role.

In 1991, he was traded to the Chicago Blackhawks with Brad Lauer for Adam Creighton and Steve Thomas. He spent the last seven years of his NHL career in Chicago. During part of his time with the 'Hawks he was coached by his older brother Darryl. Brent was the last active player in the NHL that had played with the Islanders during their early 1980s dynasty, as well as the last member of the team still with the Islanders when he was traded to the Chicago Blackhawks in 1991. In 1991–92, he helped lead the Hawks to a Stanley Cup Final appearance, thus playing in four Cup finals in his career.

=== Coaching career ===
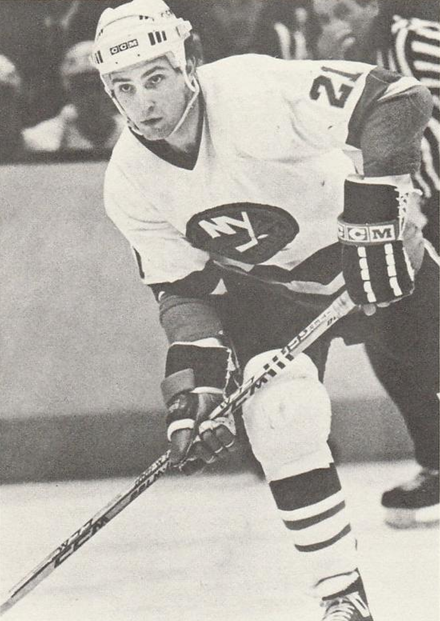
Sutter in 1983 photo

Sutter coached the Canadian junior ice hockey teams to consecutive gold medals at the 2005 World Junior Ice Hockey Championships and 2006 World Junior Ice Hockey Championships. He led both teams to unbeaten records, becoming the first coach to lead Canada to consecutive gold medals. Sutter declined Hockey Canada's offer to return for a third time in 2007. During the eight-game 2007 Super Series, Sutter extended his junior coaching unbeaten record to 20 straight games - 19 of them wins - behind the Canadian bench in international junior play.

Sutter was also the head coach and GM of the Red Deer Rebels of the WHL for eight seasons from 1999 to 2007, leading them to a finals appearance as well as two 50 win seasons. Sutter resigned as head coach and GM of the Rebels on July 12, 2007, as he reached an agreement to become the next coach of the New Jersey Devils. The following day, Sutter was introduced as head coach of the New Jersey Devils. In the 2007–08 season, Sutter led the Devils to a 46 win season and a playoff berth. The following season, Sutter enjoyed his best season as a head coach, leading the Devils to a franchise-best 51-win season, as well as an Atlantic Division title. After a first round playoff exit from the Carolina Hurricanes, Sutter stepped down as coach of the team on June 9, 2009, citing family reasons.

Two weeks later on June 23, however, Sutter was named head coach of the Calgary Flames by his brother Darryl Sutter, the Flames' general manager. Devils owner Jeff Vanderbeek was openly critical of the decision for Sutter to step down and later sign to coach another team. On April 12, 2012, he was not offered a new contract by the Calgary Flames. In November 2012, Sutter again took the reins of the Red Deer Rebels, where he also serves as General Manager.

== Sutter family in hockey ==
The Sutter family is originally from Viking, Alberta, Canada. Six brothers: Brian, Darryl, Duane, Brent, Rich and Ron, reached the NHL in the 1970s and 1980s. Four brothers: Brian, Duane, Darryl and Brent have gone on to become coaches and general managers as well. Collectively, the six Sutter brothers played over 5000 games (including playoffs) and captured six Stanley Cups. Three members of the second generation of Sutters have played in the NHL, including Brent's son Brandon, who played 770 NHL games.

== Awards and achievements ==
- NHL All-Star Game – 1985
- Bob Nystrom Award – 1991
- Inducted into the New York Islanders Hall of Fame - 2025

== Career statistics ==
=== Regular season and playoffs ===
			Regular season					Playoffs
Season	Team	League	GP	G	A	Pts	PIM	GP	G	A	Pts	PIM
1977–78	Red Deer Rustlers	AJHL	60	12	18	30	33	—	—	—	—	—
1978–79	Red Deer Rustlers	AJHL	60	42	42	84	79	—	—	—	—	—
1979–80	Red Deer Rustlers	AJHL	59	70	101	171	131	13	10	15	25	16
1979–80	Lethbridge Broncos	WHL	5	1	0	1	2	—	—	—	—	—
1980–81	Lethbridge Broncos	WHL	68	54	54	108	116	9	6	4	10	51
1980–81	New York Islanders	NHL	3	2	2	4	0	—	—	—	—	—
1981–82	Lethbridge Broncos	WHL	34	46	34	80	162	—	—	—	—	—
1981–82	New York Islanders	NHL	43	21	22	43	114	19	2	6	8	36
1982–83	New York Islanders	NHL	80	21	19	40	128	20	10	11	21	26
1983–84	New York Islanders	NHL	69	34	15	49	69	20	4	10	14	18
1984–85	New York Islanders	NHL	72	42	60	102	51	10	3	3	6	14
1985–86	New York Islanders	NHL	61	24	31	55	74	3	0	1	1	2
1986–87	New York Islanders	NHL	69	27	36	63	73	5	1	0	1	4
1987–88	New York Islanders	NHL	70	29	31	60	55	6	2	1	3	18
1988–89	New York Islanders	NHL	77	29	34	63	77	—	—	—	—	—
1989–90	New York Islanders	NHL	67	33	35	68	65	5	2	3	5	2
1990–91	New York Islanders	NHL	75	21	32	53	49	—	—	—	—	—
1991–92	New York Islanders	NHL	8	4	6	10	6	—	—	—	—	—
1991–92	Chicago Blackhawks	NHL	61	18	32	50	30	18	3	5	8	22
1992–93	Chicago Blackhawks	NHL	65	20	34	54	67	4	1	1	2	4
1993–94	Chicago Blackhawks	NHL	73	9	29	38	43	6	0	0	0	2
1994–95	Chicago Blackhawks	NHL	47	7	8	15	51	16	1	2	3	4
1995–96	Chicago Blackhawks	NHL	80	13	27	40	56	10	1	1	2	6
1996–97	Chicago Blackhawks	NHL	39	7	7	14	18	2	0	0	0	6
1997–98	Chicago Blackhawks	NHL	52	2	6	8	28	—	—	—	—	—
NHL totals			1,111	363	466	829	1,054	144	30	44	74	164

=== International ===
Year	Team	Event	Result	GP	G	A	Pts	PIM
1984	Canada	CC	1st place, gold medalist(s)	8	2	2	4	10
1986	Canada	WC	3rd place, bronze medalist(s)	8	4	7	11	8
1987	Canada	CC	1st place, gold medalist(s)	9	1	3	4	6
1991	Canada	CC	1st place, gold medalist(s)	8	3	1	4	6
Senior totals				33	10	13	23	30

== Head coaching record ==
=== NHL ===
Season	Team	Regular season						Postseason			
Season	Team	G	W	L	OTL	Pts	Finish	W	L	Win %	Result
2007–08	NJD	82	46	29	7	99	second in Atlantic	1	4	.200	Lost in conference quarterfinals (NYR)
2008–09	NJD	82	51	27	4	106	1st in Atlantic	3	4	.429	Lost conference quarterfinals (CAR)
2009–10	CGY	82	40	32	10	90	third in Northwest	—	—	—	Did not qualify
2010-11	CGY	82	41	29	12	94	second in Northwest	—	—	—	Did not qualify
2011-12	CGY	82	37	29	16	90	second in Northwest	—	—	—	Did not qualify
NHL total		410	215	146	49			4	8	.333	2 playoff appearances

=== Junior leagues ===
Season	Team	League	Regular season							Postseason
Season	Team	League	G	W	L	T	OTL	Pts	Division rank	Result
1999–2000	Red Deer Rebels	WHL	72	32	31	9	0	73	third in Central	Lost Eastern Conference quarter-final (Ice, 4-0)
2000–01	Red Deer Rebels	WHL	72	54	12	3	3	114	1st in Central	Won WHL championship Won Memorial Cup (Portland, 4-1)
2002–03	Red Deer Rebels	WHL	72	50	17	3	2	105	1st in Central	Lost final (Rockets, 4-2)
2003–04	Red Deer Rebels	WHL	72	35	22	10	5	85	second in Central	Lost Eastern Conference final (Tigers, 4-2)
2004–05	Red Deer Rebels	WHL	72	36	26	6	4	82	4th in Central	Lost Eastern Conference quarter-final (Tigers, 4-3)
2005–06	Red Deer Rebels	WHL	72	26	40	—	6	58	5th in Central	Did not qualify
2006–07	Red Deer Rebels	WHL	72	35	28	—	9	79	4th in Central	Lost Eastern Conference quarter-final (Tigers, 4-3)
2012–13	Red Deer Rebels	WHL	49	29	15	—	5	(85)	third in Central	Lost Eastern Conference semi-final (Hitmen, 4-1)
2013–14	Red Deer Rebels	WHL	73	35	33	—	5	75	5th in Central	Lost Eastern Conference tiebreaker (Raiders, 5-3)
2014–15	Red Deer Rebels	WHL	72	38	23	—	11	87	third in Central	Lost Eastern Conference quarter-final (Tigers, 4-1)
2015–16	Red Deer Rebels	WHL	72	45	24	—	3	93	second in Central	Lost Eastern Conference final Lost Memorial Cup semi-final (Hitmen, 4-1)
2016–17	Red Deer Rebels	WHL	72	30	29	—	13	73	third in Central	Lost Eastern Conference quarter-final (Hurricanes, 4-3)
2017–18	Red Deer Rebels	WHL	72	27	32	—	13	67	third in Central	Lost Eastern Conference quarter-final (Hurricanes, 4-1)
2018–19	Red Deer Rebels	WHL	68	33	29	—	6	72	5th in Central	Lost Eastern Conference quarter-final (Raiders, 4-0)
2019–20	Red Deer Rebels	WHL	63	24	33	3	3	54	5th in Central	Season cancelled due to COVID-19 pandemic
2020–21	Red Deer Rebels	WHL	23	4	15	—	4	12	no standings (Note: The 2020–21 WHL regular season was shortened, started late, then was cancelled early, and no playoffs were held, due to the ongoing COVID-19 pandemic. The Red Deer Rebels were in a mathematical position to finish anywhere from 4th to 5th in the Central Division when the season was cancelled.)	no playoffs

=== International ===
Year	Event	G	W	L	T	OTL	Result
2005	WJC	6	6	0	0	0	Gold medal
2006	WJC	6	6	0	0	0	Gold medal
2007	SS	8	7	0	1	0	Champions
2014	WJC	7	4	2	0	1	4th place
Total		27	23	2	1	1	

== See also ==
- Captain (ice hockey)
- Notable families in the NHL
- List of NHL players with 1,000 games played

== Notes ==
Preceded by Duane Sutter	New York Islanders first-round draft pick 1980	Succeeded by Paul Boutilier
Preceded by Denis Potvin	New York Islanders captain 1987–91	Succeeded by Patrick Flatley
Preceded by Lou Lamoriello	Head coach of the New Jersey Devils; 2007–09	Succeeded by Jacques Lemaire
Preceded by Mike Keenan	Head coach of the Calgary Flames; 2009–12	Succeeded by Bob Hartley
