= De Soto (surname) =

de Soto is a Spanish surname. Notable people with the surname include:

- Alexander de Soto (1840–1936), Spanish-American physician, businessman, and philanthropist
- Álvaro de Soto (born 1943), Peruvian diplomat and UN envoy
- Benito de Soto (1805–1830), pirate
- Domingo de Soto (1494–1560), Spanish theologian
- Ernest de Soto (1923–2014), American printmaker and lithographer
- Ernestine Ygnacio-De Soto, Barbareño Chumash activist and historian
- Francisco de Soto (c. 1500 – c. 1563), Spanish organist and composer
- Hernando de Soto (c. 1496/1497 – c. 1563), Spanish conquistador
- Hernando de Soto Polar (born 1941), Peruvian economist and author
- Jesús Huerta de Soto (born 1956), economist, born in Spain
- Luis Barahona de Soto (1548–1595), Spanish poet
- Pedro de Soto (1493–1563), Spanish theologian
