= Sutter Avenue =

Sutter Avenue may refer to the following stations of the New York City Subway in Brooklyn:

- Sutter Avenue–Rutland Road (IRT New Lots Line), serving the 2, 3, 4, and 5 trains
- Sutter Avenue (BMT Canarsie Line), serving the L train
