= Syl Apps III =

American ice hockey player (born 1976)

- Born: June 2, 1976 (age 50) Pittsburgh, Pennsylvania, U.S.
- Height: 6 ft 0 in (183 cm)
- Weight: 195 lb (88 kg; 13 st 13 lb)
- Position: Center
- Shot: Right
- Played for: St. John's Maple Leafs; Norfolk Admirals; Springfield Falcons
- NHL draft: Undrafted
- Playing career: 1999–2003

Sylvanus Marshall Apps III (born June 2, 1976) is an American former professional minor league ice hockey player, the grandson of Toronto Maple Leafs captain Syl Apps and the son of Pittsburgh Penguins player Syl Apps Jr.

== Playing career ==
As a teenager, he was coached by Brian Conacher, son of Toronto Maple Leafs legend Lionel Conacher at Upper Canada College. Before playing for the Princeton Tigers, Apps played for the St. Michael's Buzzers in 1994-95.

=== Princeton ===
Apps III was a four-time letter winner at Princeton. In addition, he was captain of the Princeton Tigers during the 1998–99 season. As of the 2009–10 Princeton season, Apps is 35th on the Tigers all-time scoring list. For his career, Apps played in 122 games, scored 30 goals and registered 41 assists for a career total of 71. Apps ranks 11th in most games played in a career at Princeton, while he is tied for second overall in most postseason games played in a career with 19. On March 21, 1998, Apps scored the game-winning goal that ended the third longest Princeton game. The game lasted 80:48, and Princeton defeated Clarkson by a score of 5-4 to claim the ECAC Championship.

=== Professional ===
On July 22, 1999, Apps was signed as a free agent by the Toronto Maple Leafs. Apps played in the American Hockey League with the St. John's Maple Leafs, Norfolk Admirals, and Springfield Falcons. He also played in the ECHL with the Jackson Bandits, and the Trenton Titans. As a member of the Trenton Titans, Apps was the team captain.

== Personal ==
His sister Gillian Apps won gold medals with the Canadian Olympic women's ice hockey teams in 2006 and 2010. His other sister, Amy Apps, was a member of the Canadian National women's Soccer team and an OUA All Star in 1998 and 1999. His cousin, Darren Barber, won a gold medal in the men's eight at the 1992 Summer Olympics in Barcelona, as a member of the Canadian team. Barber also competed at the 1996 Summer Olympics in Atlanta, where he finished fourth.

Apps lives in the Toronto area and works as a managing director for Hines in Toronto.

== Career statistics ==
			Regular season					Playoffs
Season	Team	League	GP	G	A	Pts	PIM	GP	G	A	Pts	PIM
1994–95	St. Michael's Buzzers	MetJHL	6	3	1	4	2	—	—	—	—	—
1995–96	Princeton University	ECAC	26	4	6	10	30	—	—	—	—	—
1996–97	Princeton University	ECAC	27	3	6	9	40	—	—	—	—	—
1997–98	Princeton University	ECAC	35	10	8	18	65	—	—	—	—	—
1998–99	Princeton University	ECAC	34	13	21	34	45	—	—	—	—	—
1999–00	St. John's Maple Leafs	AHL	58	5	7	12	87	—	—	—	—	—
2000–01	St. John's Maple Leafs	AHL	69	6	8	14	73	4	0	0	0	0
2001–02	Jackson Bandits	ECHL	12	3	2	5	19	—	—	—	—	—
2001–02	Norfolk Admirals	AHL	1	0	0	0	0	—	—	—	—	—
2001–02	Trenton Titans	ECHL	42	8	15	23	56	7	1	1	2	16
2001–02	Springfield Falcons	AHL	6	1	0	1	0	—	—	—	—	—
2002–03	Trenton Titans	ECHL	55	11	21	32	119	1	0	0	0	4
AHL totals			134	12	15	27	160	4	0	0	0	0

== Awards and honours ==
Award	Year
College
ECAC All-Tournament Team	1998
All-Ivy Honorable Mention	1998
All-Ivy Academic Team	1998, 1999
ECAC Best Defensive Forward	1999
All-Ivy Second Team	1999
Princeton Tigers
Letterwinner	1996, 1997, 1998, 1999
Richard F. Vaughan Cup	1999

Awards and achievements
Preceded by Buddy Wallace	ECAC Hockey Best Defensive Forward; 1998–99	Succeeded by Doug Stienstra
