= Brandon Sutter =

Canadian ice hockey player (born 1989)

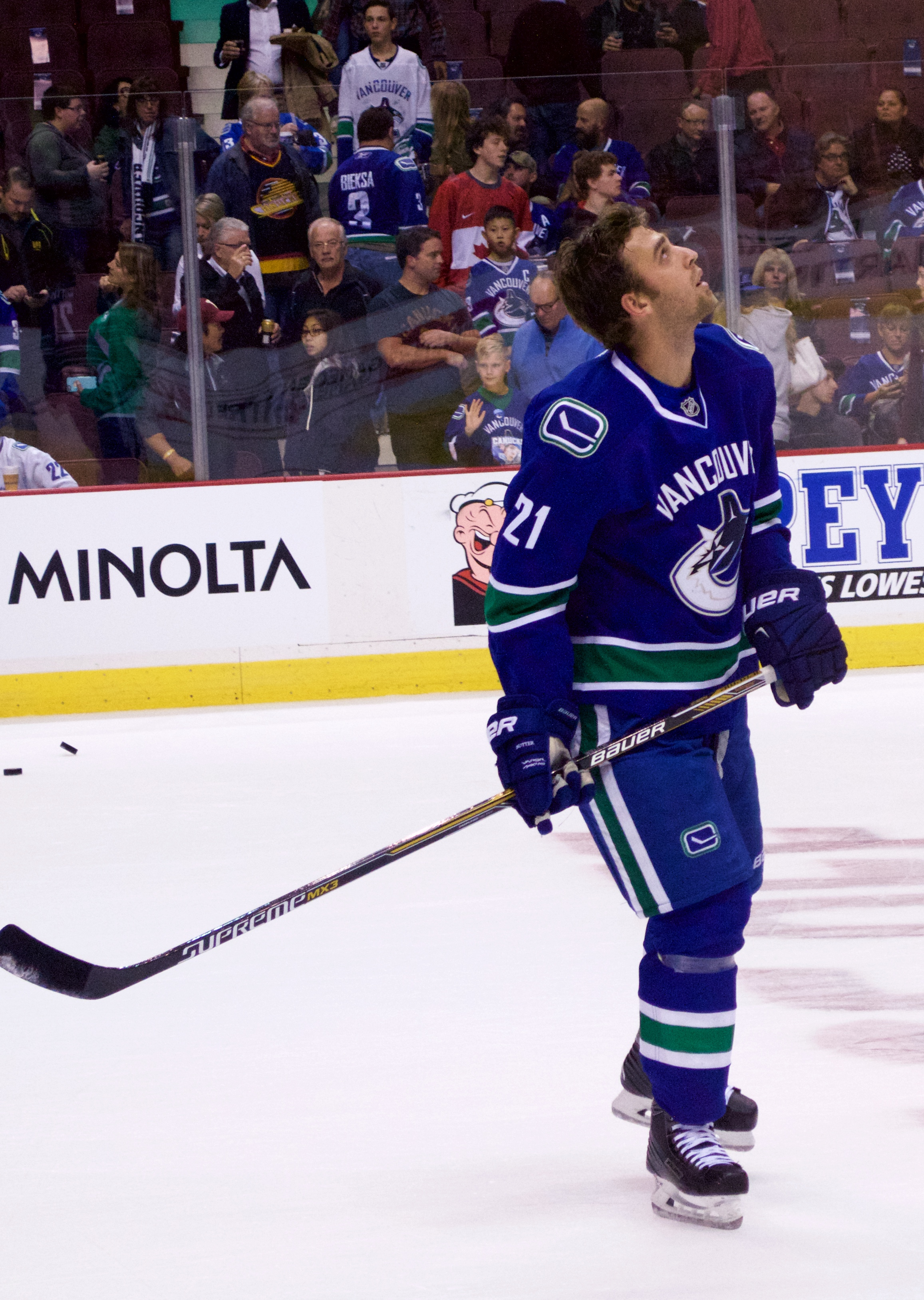
- Sutter with the Vancouver Canucks in 2015
- Born: February 14, 1989 (age 37) Huntington, New York, U.S.
- Height: 6 ft 3 in (191 cm)
- Weight: 188 lb (85 kg; 13 st 6 lb)
- Position: Centre
- Shot: Right
- Played for: Carolina Hurricanes; Pittsburgh Penguins; Vancouver Canucks
- NHL draft: 11th overall, 2007; Carolina Hurricanes
- Playing career: 2008–2021

Brandon Sutter (born February 14, 1989) is a Canadian-American former professional ice hockey player who played in the National Hockey League (NHL) for the Carolina Hurricanes, Pittsburgh Penguins, and Vancouver Canucks.

== Playing career ==
=== Junior ===
Sutter played major junior hockey with the Red Deer Rebels of the Western Hockey League (WHL) under head coach and father Brent Sutter. During the 2006–07 season, he was selected to represent the WHL at the annual ADT Canada-Russia Challenge. Additionally, Sutter was selected to play in the 2007 CHL Top Prospects Game in January. In the off-season, Sutter was drafted 11th overall by the Carolina Hurricanes in the 2007 NHL entry draft.

=== Professional ===
==== Carolina Hurricanes ====
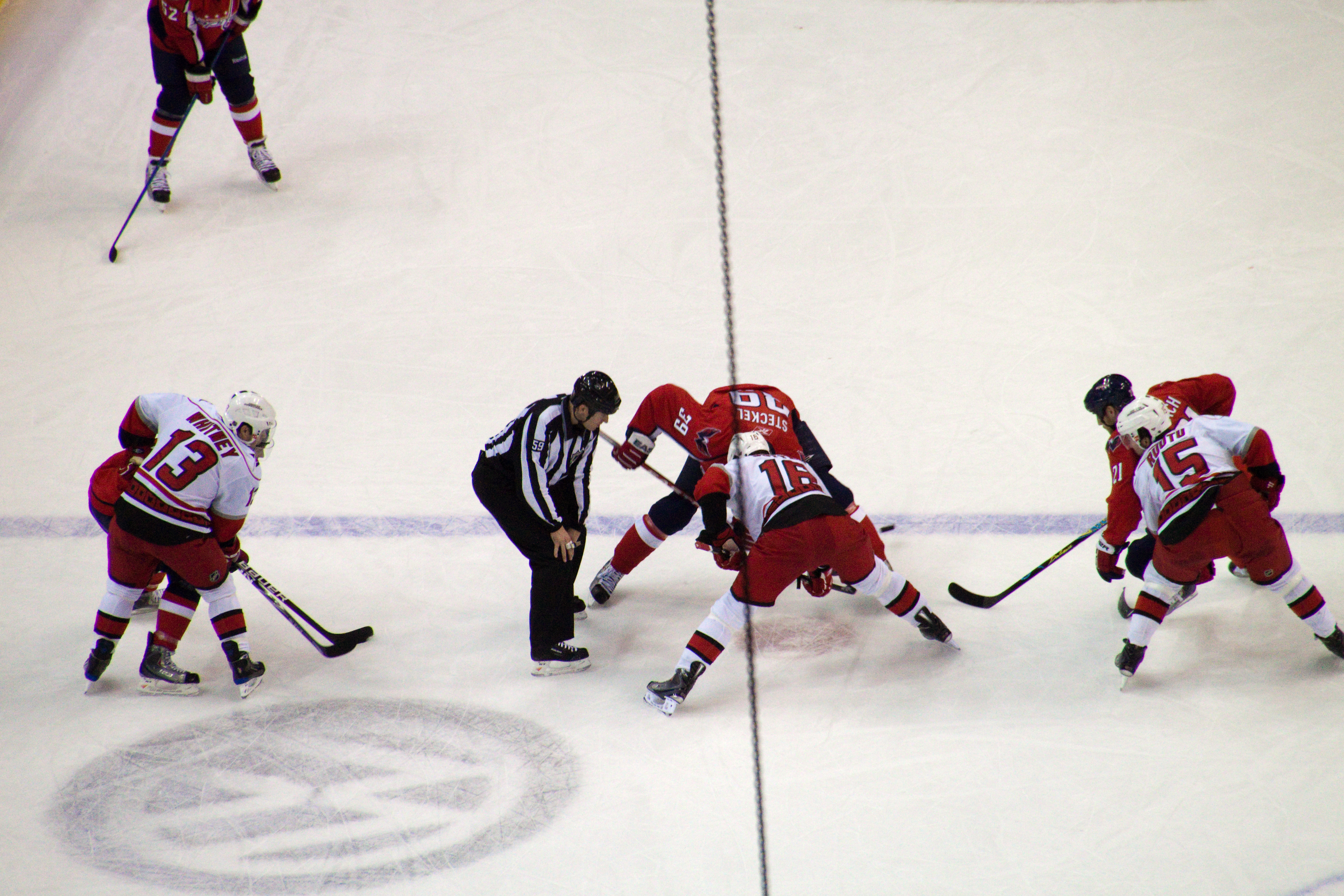
Sutter (centre foreground) taking a face-off against Dave Steckel, December 2009

After a brief stint with Carolina's then-American Hockey League (AHL) affiliate, the Albany River Rats, at the end of his 2007–08 WHL season, Sutter debuted in the NHL with the Hurricanes in 2008–09. On October 23, 2008, he scored his first NHL goal against Marc-André Fleury of the Pittsburgh Penguins. The next game, on October 25, Sutter suffered a concussion after a collision with Doug Weight of the New York Islanders. Sutter had his head down as he was leaning forward for a loose puck in the neutral zone when Weight caught him with his shoulder. Although the hit was ruled as legal and Weight was not assessed any penalty, it re-sparked the debate in the NHL on head shots. Sutter returned to the line-up after missing eight games.

On July 12, 2011, Sutter signed a three-year, $6.2 million contract extension with Carolina.

==== Pittsburgh Penguins ====
On June 22, 2012, Sutter was traded to the Pittsburgh Penguins (along with Brian Dumoulin and Carolina's first-round pick in the 2012 NHL entry draft, which the Penguins used to select Derrick Pouliot) in exchange for Jordan Staal.

On March 12, 2013, in a game against the Boston Bruins, he scored two goals 3:24 apart in the third period that led to a 3–2 comeback victory for Pittsburgh.

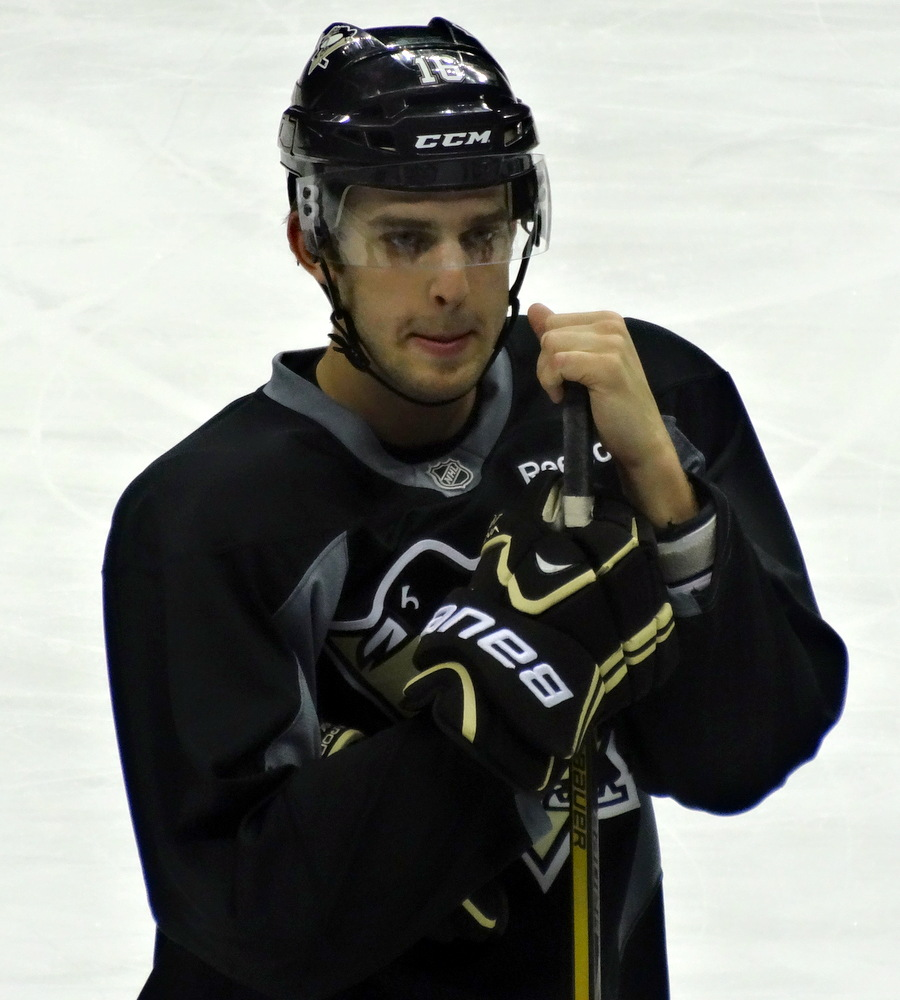
Sutter practicing with the Penguins, January 2013

On August 5, 2014, the Penguins announced they had re-signed Sutter to a two-year, $6.6 million contract extension.

==== Vancouver Canucks ====
On July 28, 2015, Sutter was traded (along with a third-round pick in the 2016 NHL entry draft) to the Vancouver Canucks in exchange for Nick Bonino, Adam Clendening and a second-round pick in 2016. On August 4, 2015, the Canucks announced they had signed Sutter to a five-year, $21.875 million contract extension. Sutter played 16 games in the 2015–16 season before it was revealed he required sports hernia surgery. He missed 33 games before returning to the Canucks lineup on January 26, 2016. However, on February 9, his fourth game back following the surgery, he suffered a broken jaw in a game against the Colorado Avalanche that sidelined him for the remainder of the season. Sutter scored 5 goals and 4 assists for 9 points in 20 games for the Canucks in an injury-plagued 2015–16 season.

In August 2016, the Canucks announced Sutter had switched from number 21 to 20 after Chris Higgins (who previously wore 20 the previous six seasons) had the final year of his contract bought out, to let new Canucks free agent acquisition Loui Eriksson wear number 21. On January 4, 2017, Sutter was awarded his second career penalty shot, converting against Mike Smith of the Arizona Coyotes.

On November 24, 2017, Sutter suffered a groin injury in a 3–2 loss to the New Jersey Devils. After missing 21 games, Sutter returned to the lineup on January 14, 2018, scoring the overtime-winning goal in a 3–2 win over the Minnesota Wild.

On October 29, 2018, Sutter suffered a separated shoulder in a game against the Minnesota Wild. He was expected to miss four-to-six weeks. He returned to Vancouver's lineup in early January before suffering another groin injury, his third in four seasons with the Canucks, on February 9, 2019, in a game versus the Calgary Flames. On March 5, 2019, the Canucks revealed that Sutter would undergo surgery on his other sports hernia, ending his season.

Sutter's injury troubles in Vancouver continued during the 2019–20 season. He missed 13 games with a lower–body injury sustained on November 12 in a game versus the Nashville Predators. He returned in December 2019 but after three games, he again left the Canucks lineup, this time missing 12 games with an upper-body injury. Sutter ultimately returned to the Canucks lineup in January 2020 and played in every subsequent game before the final month of the season was cancelled due to the COVID-19 pandemic. Sutter scored one goal and five assists in the 2020 playoffs.

On January 25, 2021, Sutter scored his first career NHL hat-trick against the Ottawa Senators. Following his sixth year with the Canucks in the 2020–21 season and having concluded his contract, Sutter opted to forgo free agency in re-signing to a one-year, $1.125 million contract extension with Vancouver on July 29, 2021. However, Sutter did not play in the 2021–22 NHL season due to suffering from long COVID, following his positive test result in March 2021. He was placed on long term injured reserve for the season, and also sat out the 2022–23 NHL season.

== Retirement ==
On August 29, 2023, Sutter signed a professional tryout (PTO) contract with the Edmonton Oilers. On October 1, Sutter announced his retirement after he was released from his PTO.

== International play ==
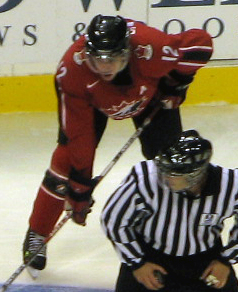

Medal record

Representing Canada

Ice hockey

World Junior Championships
Gold medal – first place	2008	Czech Republic

Sutter, who has dual citizenship of both the United States and Canada, elected to play for Canada in international competition. Sutter represented Canada extensively during his junior career at the under-18 and under-20 levels. He competed in two IIHF World U18 Championships in 2006 and 2007, losing the bronze medal game in both tournaments.

Shortly after being drafted into the NHL in the summer of 2007, Sutter was chosen to represent Canada at the 2007 Super Series, an eight-game showdown between Canada and Russia's under-20 teams, where father Brent Sutter was head coach. Playing Game 7 in his hometown of Red Deer, Alberta, he scored a goal and was named player of the game. Coincidentally, the match also marked the last junior game Brent coached in Red Deer, where he had previously just completed a seven-year coaching career with the Red Deer Rebels. Sutter made his second under-20 appearance for Canada at the 2008 World Junior Championships in the Czech Republic, where he helped Canada win gold, overcoming Sweden 3–2 in overtime.

== Personal life ==
Sutter is part of the venerable Sutter hockey family. He is the son of Brent Sutter, who coached him in junior with the Red Deer Rebels and Team Canada at the 2007 Super Series; Brent is a former head coach of the Calgary Flames. He has an older brother, Merrick, who currently serves as the Rebels' senior vice president, and a younger sister, Brooke.

Sutter's cousin Brett was a teammate of his with the Rebels who was drafted two years ahead of him by the Calgary Flames, and currently coaches in the American Hockey League. Another cousin, Brody, played for the WHL's Lethbridge Hurricanes and was drafted 193rd overall by Carolina in the 2011 draft. Brody played professionally in the AHL as well as in Europe.

As a result of his father's career, Sutter grew up in Huntington, New York, and Chicago, Illinois, before his family settled in Red Deer, Alberta, following Brent Sutter's purchase of the Red Deer Rebels organization.

In March 2021, he was one of 21 Canucks players that contracted COVID-19 and is now considered a "long-hauler" experiencing post-COVID after effects which prevent him from training. Unlike ex-Edmonton Oilers backup goalie Alex Stalock and forward Josh Archibald, Sutter does not suffer from myocarditis, a condition that causes heart inflammation associated with COVID-19.

Sutter was known as "Flat Stanley" to his Penguins teammates, due to his thin frame. Flat Stanley is a children's book character who is squashed under a bulletin board and becomes flattened. He then mails himself around the world to have adventures.

== Career statistics ==
=== Regular season and playoffs ===
			Regular season					Playoffs
Season	Team	League	GP	G	A	Pts	PIM	GP	G	A	Pts	PIM
2004–05	Red Deer Rebels	WHL	7	0	2	2	8	7	1	4	5	2
2005–06	Red Deer Rebels	WHL	68	22	24	46	36	—	—	—	—	—
2006–07	Red Deer Rebels	WHL	71	20	37	57	54	7	0	3	3	14
2007–08	Red Deer Rebels	WHL	59	26	23	49	38	—	—	—	—	—
2007–08	Albany River Rats	AHL	7	1	1	2	2	7	0	2	2	4
2008–09	Carolina Hurricanes	NHL	50	1	5	6	16	—	—	—	—	—
2008–09	Albany River Rats	AHL	22	4	8	12	16	—	—	—	—	—
2009–10	Carolina Hurricanes	NHL	72	21	19	40	2	—	—	—	—	—
2010–11	Carolina Hurricanes	NHL	82	14	15	29	25	—	—	—	—	—
2011–12	Carolina Hurricanes	NHL	82	17	15	32	21	—	—	—	—	—
2012–13	Pittsburgh Penguins	NHL	48	11	8	19	4	15	2	1	3	0
2013–14	Pittsburgh Penguins	NHL	81	13	13	26	12	13	5	2	7	2
2014–15	Pittsburgh Penguins	NHL	80	21	12	33	14	5	1	1	2	2
2015–16	Vancouver Canucks	NHL	20	5	4	9	2	—	—	—	—	—
2016–17	Vancouver Canucks	NHL	81	17	17	34	12	—	—	—	—	—
2017–18	Vancouver Canucks	NHL	61	11	15	26	8	—	—	—	—	—
2018–19	Vancouver Canucks	NHL	26	4	2	6	6	—	—	—	—	—
2019–20	Vancouver Canucks	NHL	44	8	9	17	25	17	1	5	6	4
2020–21	Vancouver Canucks	NHL	43	9	3	12	2	—	—	—	—	—
NHL totals			770	152	137	289	149	50	9	9	18	8

=== International ===
Year	Team	Event	Result	GP	G	A	Pts	PIM
2006	Canada Pacific	U17	4th	6	4	2	6	0
2006	Canada	WJC18	4th	7	2	0	2	2
2006	Canada	IH18	1st place, gold medalist(s)	4	0	2	2	0
2007	Canada	WJC18	4th	6	1	1	2	2
2008	Canada	WJC	1st place, gold medalist(s)	7	0	1	1	2
Junior totals				30	7	6	13	6

Awards and achievements
Preceded by Jack Johnson	Carolina Hurricanes first-round draft pick 2007	Succeeded by Zach Boychuk
