= Viking, Alberta =

Viking
- Town
- Town of Viking
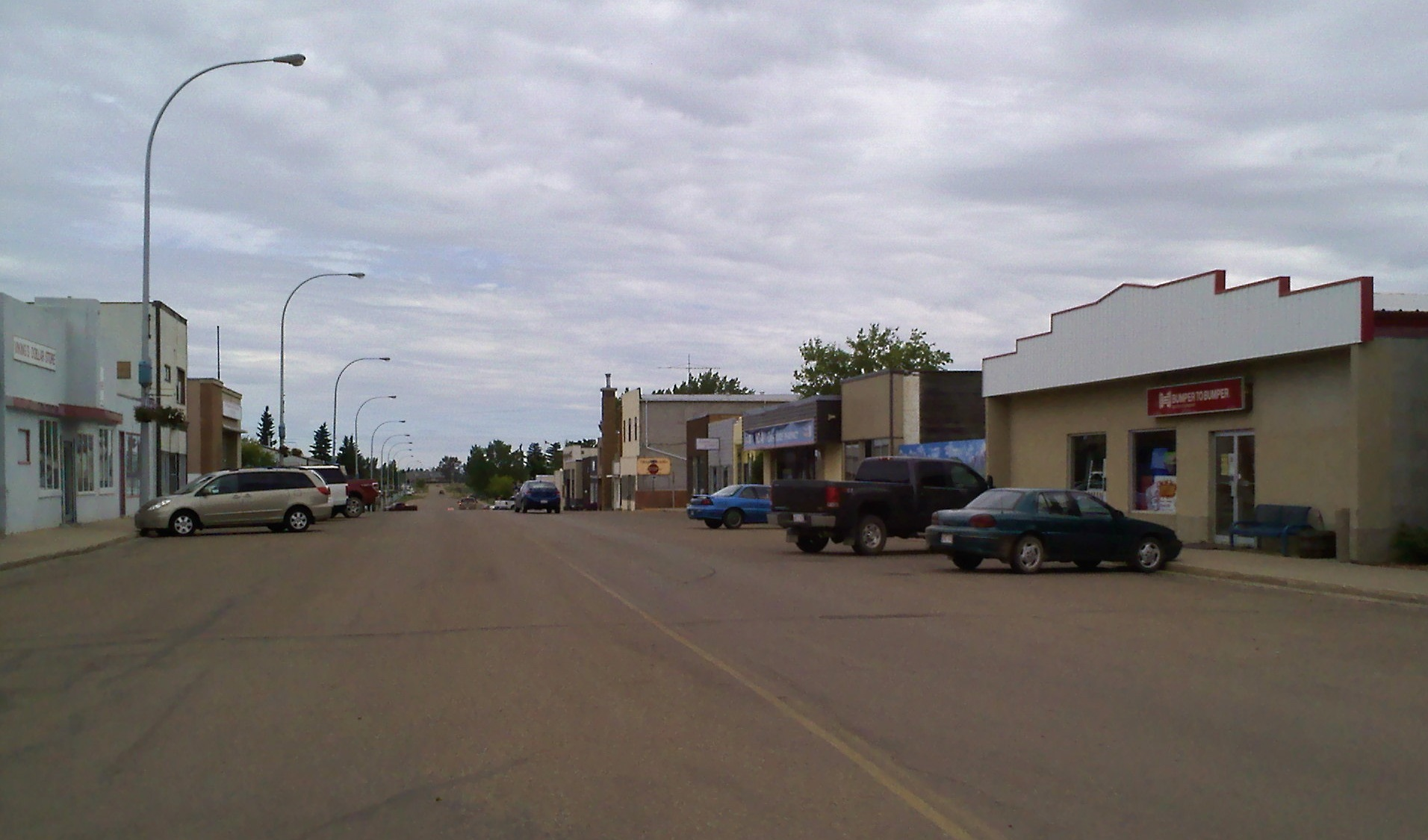
- Main Street

- Location of Viking in Alberta
- Coordinates: 53°5′43″N 111°46′37″W
- Country: Canada
- Province: Alberta
- Region: Central Alberta
- Census division: 10
- Municipal district: Beaver County
- Incorporated
  - Village: 5 February 1909
  - Town: 10 November 1952

Government
  - Mayor: Paul King
  - Governing body: Viking Town Council

Area (2021)
  - Land: 3.45 km^{2} (1.33 sq mi)
- Elevation: 691 m (2,267 ft)

Population (2021)
  - Total: 986
  - Density: 285.9/km^{2} (740/sq mi)
- Time zone: UTC−06:00 (Alberta Time)
- Postal code: T0B 4N0
- Area codes: +1-780, +1-587
- Highways: Highway 14; Highway 36
- Railway: Canadian National Railway
- Waterway: Thomas Lake
- Website: www.viking.ca

Viking (/ˈvaɪkɪŋ/) is a town in central Alberta, Canada. It is at the intersection of Highway 14 (Poundmaker Trail) and Highway 36 (Veterans Memorial Highway), approximately 121 km (75 mi) east of Edmonton.

The town also lends its name to the Viking Formation, an oil bearing stratigraphical unit.

== History ==
Viking was settled in 1909 by Scandinavian settlers Sivert Hafso and Ole Sorenson, from Norway.

On 7 July 2005, the community ice arena was severely damaged by fire. Construction began on a new arena, called the "Viking Carena Complex" and was completed on 17 August 2007.

Viking celebrated its centennial in 2009.

== Geography ==
=== Climate ===
Viking experiences a humid continental climate (Köppen climate classification Dfb). Summers are warm with moderate rainfall while winters are long and bitterly cold.

Climate data for Viking
Month	Jan	Feb	Mar	Apr	May	Jun	Jul	Aug	Sep	Oct	Nov	Dec	Year
Record high °C (°F)	11.1 (52.0)	12.8 (55.0)	18.9 (66.0)	32.8 (91.0)	34.4 (93.9)	37.2 (99.0)	39.4 (102.9)	36.7 (98.1)	35 (95)	29.4 (84.9)	20.6 (69.1)	14.4 (57.9)	39.4 (102.9)
Mean daily maximum °C (°F)	−8.1 (17.4)	−5.1 (22.8)	1.2 (34.2)	11.3 (52.3)	17.9 (64.2)	21.6 (70.9)	23.6 (74.5)	23.1 (73.6)	17.8 (64.0)	10.8 (51.4)	−1.2 (29.8)	−6.5 (20.3)	8.9 (48.0)
Daily mean °C (°F)	−13.4 (7.9)	−10.7 (12.7)	−4.2 (24.4)	4.9 (40.8)	11 (52)	15 (59)	16.9 (62.4)	16 (61)	11.1 (52.0)	4.7 (40.5)	−6 (21)	−11.6 (11.1)	2.8 (37.0)
Mean daily minimum °C (°F)	−18.7 (−1.7)	−16.3 (2.7)	−9.6 (14.7)	−1.6 (29.1)	4 (39)	8.4 (47.1)	10.2 (50.4)	8.8 (47.8)	4.4 (39.9)	−1.5 (29.3)	−10.8 (12.6)	−16.6 (2.1)	−3.3 (26.1)
Record low °C (°F)	−50 (−58)	−56.2 (−69.2)	−41.1 (−42.0)	−31.1 (−24.0)	−12.2 (10.0)	−3.3 (26.1)	−1.1 (30.0)	−4.4 (24.1)	−26.7 (−16.1)	−25.6 (−14.1)	−38.3 (−36.9)	−46.1 (−51.0)	−56.2 (−69.2)
Average precipitation mm (inches)	17.9 (0.70)	9.6 (0.38)	14.6 (0.57)	23.1 (0.91)	44.1 (1.74)	78.9 (3.11)	81.1 (3.19)	68.1 (2.68)	42.5 (1.67)	16.5 (0.65)	16.6 (0.65)	18.3 (0.72)	431.3 (16.98)
Source: Environment Canada

== Demographics ==
In the 2021 Census of Population conducted by Statistics Canada, the Town of Viking had a population of 986 living in 432 of its 490 total private dwellings, a change of −9% from its 2016 population of 1,083. With a land area of 3.45 km^{2} (1.33 sq mi), it had a population density of 285.8/km^{2} (740.2/sq mi) in 2021.

In the 2016 Census of Population conducted by Statistics Canada, the Town of Viking recorded a population of 1,083 living in 460 of its 505 total private dwellings, a 4% change from its 2011 population of 1,041. With a land area of 3.7 km^{2} (1.4 sq mi), it had a population density of 292.7/km^{2} (758.1/sq mi) in 2016.

== Economy ==
The majority of economic activity is in the agriculture, oil and gas, textile, and manufacturing industries.

== Arts and culture ==
Viking won the national Communities in Bloom contest in 2000.

== Attractions ==
Many parks and flower gardens are maintained throughout the town. One of the most notable parks is Troll Park, which celebrates Vikings's rich Scandinavian history with native plants, trolls hidden throughout the park, and a giant troll mountain.

== Infrastructure ==
The Viking Airport is a small airport owned by the Town of Viking 4.8 kilometres (3.0 mi) west of the townsite, with the Transport Canada airport identifier of CEE8.

As a flag stop, Via Rail's The Canadian calls at the Viking railway station.

== Notable people ==
- Cory Clouston, former hockey coach
- Murray Dorin, Canadian politician, Progressive Conservative MP (1984–1993)
- Don Mazankowski, former politician
- Donald Sanderlin, Olympian
- Sutter family, a hockey family that includes Brent, Brian, Duane, Rich, Ron, and Darryl, all of whom formerly played professional hockey in the NHL
- Carson Soucy, professional NHL ice hockey player

== Gallery ==
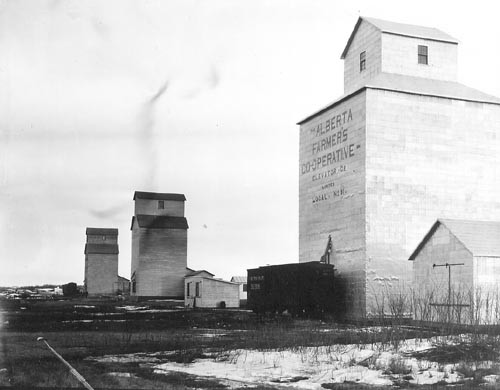
Alberta Farmers Cooperative Elevator company elevator, Viking, Alberta 1913.

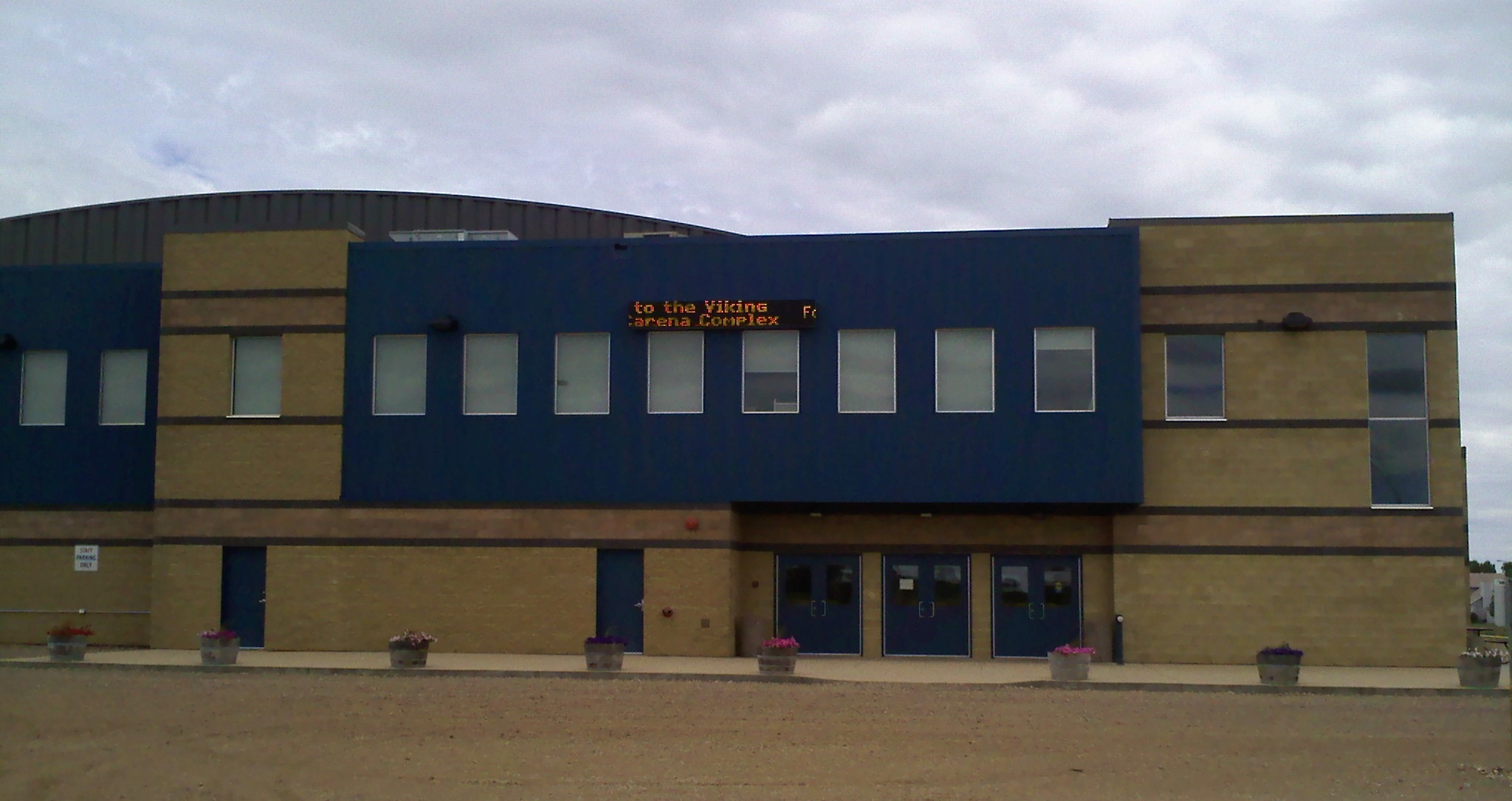
The Viking Carena Complex

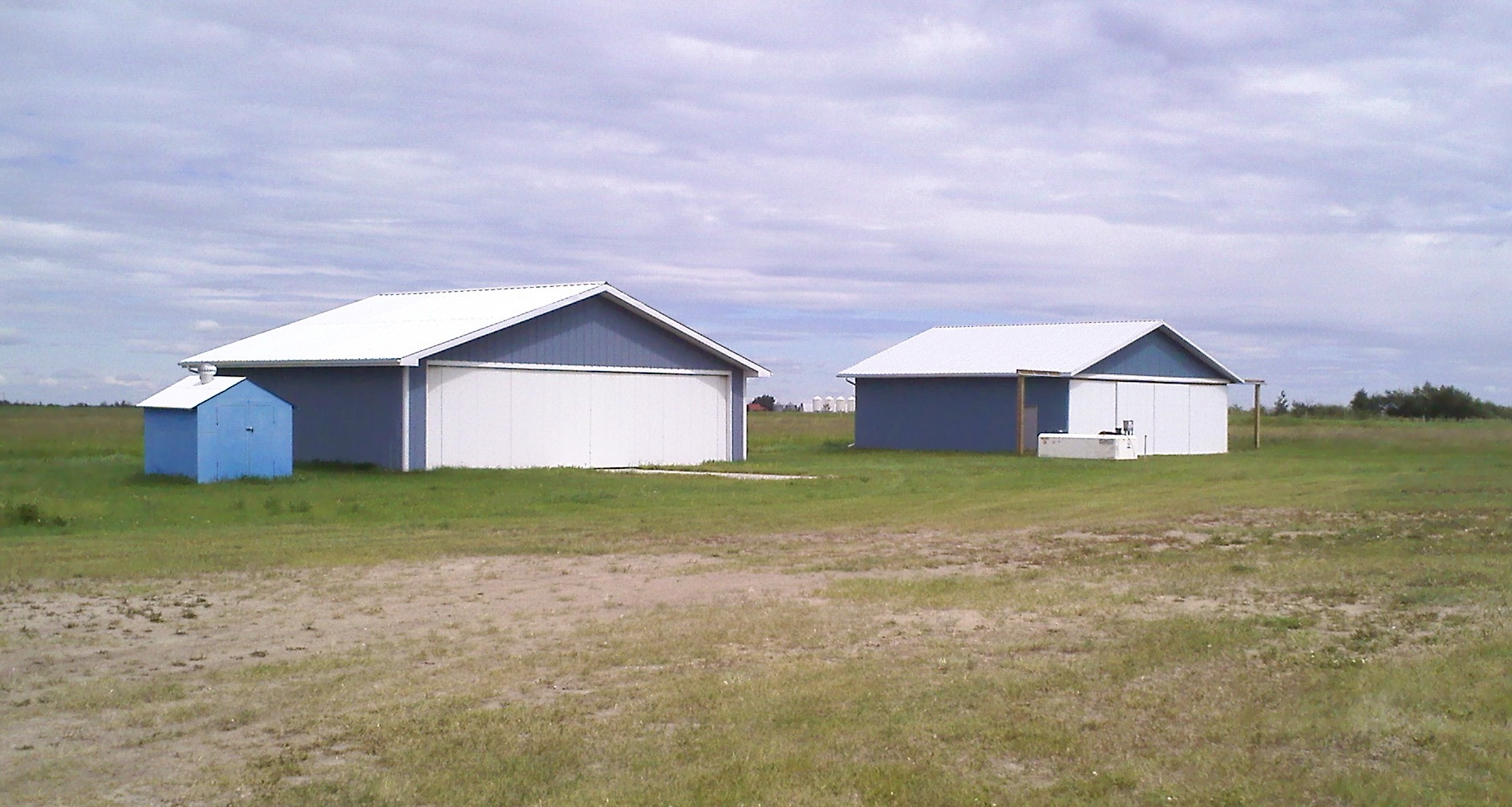
Viking airport

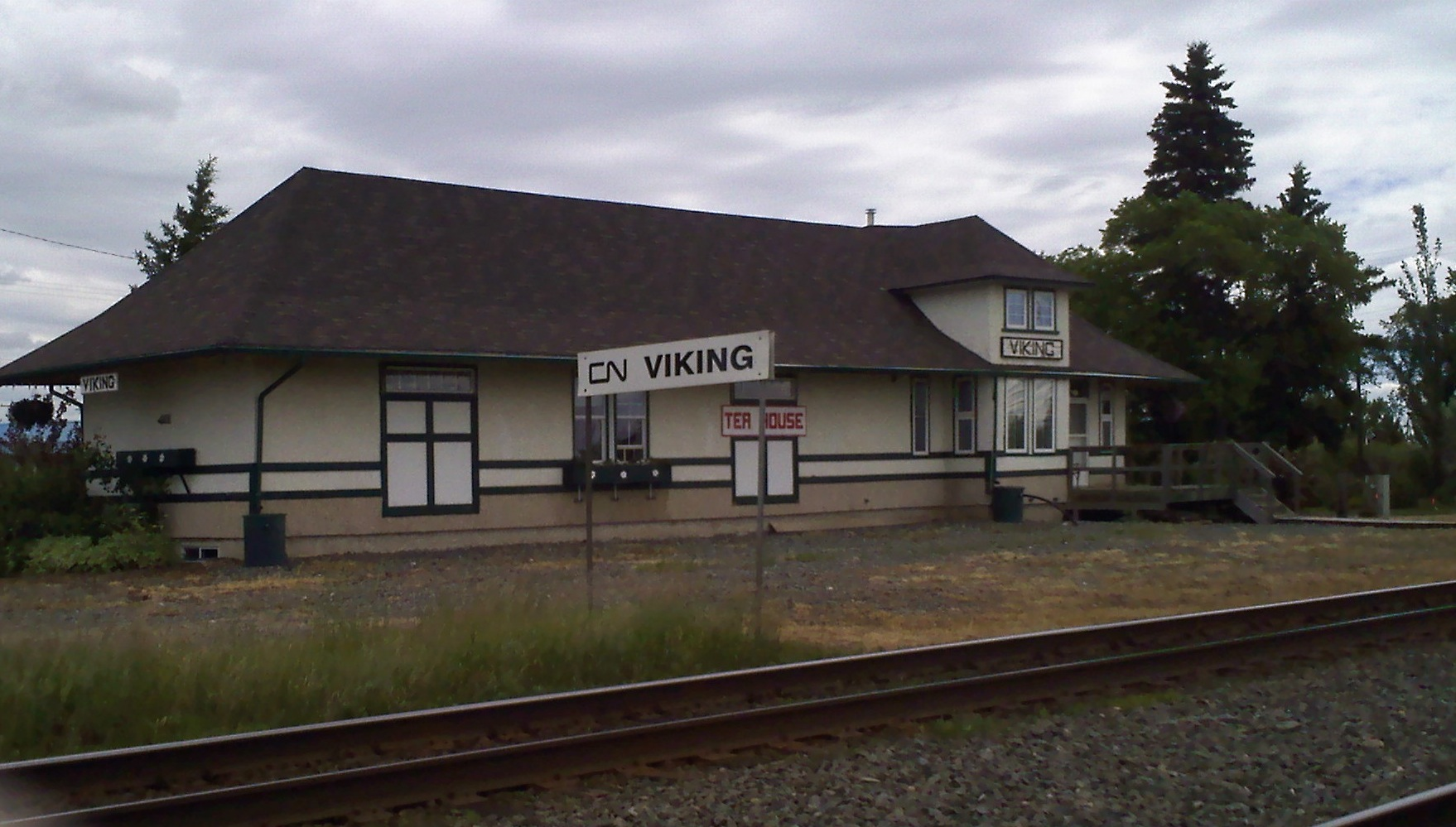
Viking Railway Station turned tea house

== See also ==
- List of communities in Alberta
- List of towns in Alberta
