= Shaun Sutter =

Canadian ice hockey player

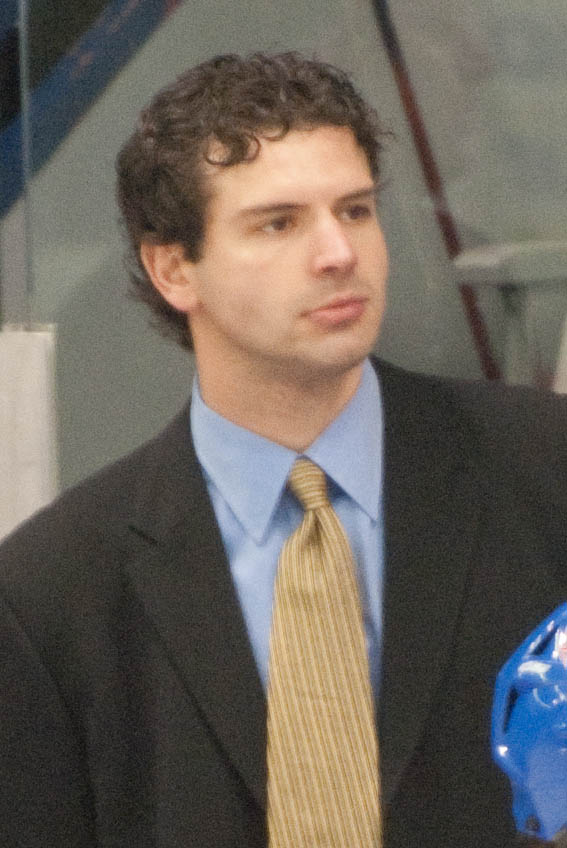
- Sutter in 2010
- Born: June 2, 1980 (age 45) Red Deer, Alberta, Canada
- Height: 6 ft 1 in (185 cm)
- Weight: 175 lb (79 kg; 12 st 7 lb)
- Position: Right wing
- Shot: Right
- Played for: AHL; Saint John Flames; Lowell Lock Monsters; ECHL; Johnstown Chiefs; Florence Pride; Fresno Falcons; EIHL; Nottingham Panthers; Sheffield Steelers; Belfast Giants; Europe; Nyköpings Hockey (Sweden); Lausitzer Füchse (Germany); Alleghe Hockey (Italy)
- NHL draft: 102nd overall, 1998; Calgary Flames
- Playing career: 2001–2009

Shaun Sutter (born June 2, 1980) is a Canadian former professional ice hockey forward. He was selected by the Calgary Flames in the 4th round (102nd overall) of the 1998 NHL entry draft.

Shaun is a member of the Sutter family. His father, Brian Sutter, is a former NHL player and was the head coach of the Calgary Flames when that team drafted Shaun in the 4th round of the 1998 NHL Entry Draft—but never made it to the NHL. He spent the early years of his career in the AHL and ECHL, before heading in 2005 to Europe to play in the British Elite Ice Hockey League where he played with the Nottingham Panthers, Sheffield Steelers, and Belfast Giants.

Upon his retirement, Sutter became the assistant coach of the Western Hockey League's Regina Pats. serving in that role during the 2009-10 WHL season. As of 2024, he is with the Red Deer Rebels, serving as their Assistant General Manager.

== Career statistics ==
			Regular season					Playoffs
Season	Team	League	GP	G	A	Pts	PIM	GP	G	A	Pts	PIM
1996–97	Lethbridge Hurricanes	WHL	1	0	0	0	0	—	—	—	—	—
1997–98	Lethbridge Hurricanes	WHL	69	11	9	20	146	4	0	0	0	4
1998–99	Lethbridge Hurricanes	WHL	35	8	4	12	43	—	—	—	—	—
1998–99	Medicine Hat Tigers	WHL	23	9	5	14	38	—	—	—	—	—
1999–00	Medicine Hat Tigers	WHL	29	1	7	8	43	—	—	—	—	—
1999–00	Calgary Hitmen	WHL	6	0	1	1	8	—	—	—	—	—
2000–01	Calgary Hitmen	WHL	63	29	35	64	102	12	1	2	3	12
2000–01	Saint John Flames	AHL	1	0	0	0	0	—	—	—	—	—
2001–02	Johnstown Chiefs	ECHL	34	13	7	20	34	—	—	—	—	—
2001–02	Saint John Flames	AHL	11	0	2	2	10	—	—	—	—	—
2002–03	Johnstown Chiefs	ECHL	9	7	3	10	4	—	—	—	—	—
2002–03	Saint John Flames	AHL	35	7	4	11	14	—	—	—	—	—
2003–04	Florence Pride	ECHL	69	17	27	44	55	—	—	—	—	—
2004–05	Lowell Lock Monsters	AHL	1	0	1	1	0	1	0	0	0	0
2004–05	Fresno Falcons	ECHL	70	26	31	57	50	—	—	—	—	—
2005–06	IK Nyköping Hockey 90	Allsvenskan	3	0	0	0	2	—	—	—	—	—
2005–06	Nottingham Panthers	EIHL	37	14	16	30	69	6	2	2	4	8
2006–07	Sheffield Steelers	EIHL	48	30	25	55	46	2	1	1	2	4
2007–08	Belfast Giants	EIHL	47	29	17	46	30	2	2	1	3	0
2008–09	Lausitzer Füchse	Germany2	32	11	7	18	38	—	—	—	—	—
2008–09	HC Alleghe	Italy	11	3	5	8	10	—	—	—	—	—
AHL totals			48	7	7	14	24	1	0	0	0	0
ECHL totals			182	63	68	131	143	—	—	—	—	—
