= Sutter family =

Canadian family of hockey players

The Sutter family, originally from Viking, Alberta, Canada, are one of the most famous families in the National Hockey League (NHL). Six brothers reached the NHL in the late 1970s and early 1980s: Brent, Brian, Darryl, Duane, Rich, and Ron. Four brothers, Brent, Brian, Darryl and Duane, have gone on to become coaches and general managers as well, with Brian, Brent and Darryl each having a stint as head coach of the Calgary Flames. All brothers played for either the Chicago Blackhawks or the St. Louis Blues at one point or another. A seventh brother named Gary is said by his brothers to have been the best hockey player of all seven boys. Rather than making his living as a hockey player, Gary stayed home to work on the family farm, as Rich remarked on an episode of the Canadian sports show Off the Record.

The first generation of Sutters had at least one brother playing in the NHL for 24 seasons, from 1976–77 to 2000–01 (with all six playing from 1982–83 to 1986–87). Collectively, the Sutter brothers played nearly 5,000 games and won six Stanley Cups (with Duane on four New York Islanders Cup-winning teams from 1980 to 1983, joined by Brent for the 1982 and 1983 championships). Darryl has reached the Cup finals three times as head coach, winning the Cup twice. The second generation of Sutters has reached the NHL, as Brandon Sutter, Brody Sutter and Brett Sutter were members of the Carolina Hurricanes organization for a few seasons.

The oldest brothers' father, Louis John Sutter, died on February 10, 2005, at the age of 73, following a lengthy illness. Many established hockey figures attended his funeral, including then-Edmonton Oilers general manager Kevin Lowe, then-Oilers coach Craig MacTavish, Mike Keenan, Hall of Famer Lanny McDonald and a busload of players from the Calgary Flames.

== First generation ==
All six brothers took the same path to the NHL. Each player began his junior career with the Red Deer Rustlers of the Alberta Junior Hockey League before moving on to the WHL's Lethbridge Broncos. A seventh brother, Gary, who was the oldest, was offered a tryout with the Rustlers at the same time Brian was; however, he declined, choosing not to pursue a career playing hockey professionally. Gary's brothers have suggested that he may have been the best player of all of them.

=== Brian ===
Brian Sutter was drafted by the St. Louis Blues 20th overall in the 1976 NHL entry draft and by the Edmonton Oilers 36th overall in the 1976 WHA amateur draft. He spent the first 16 years of his adult life with the Blues, 12 as a player and four as a head coach. He appeared in three All-Star Games as a player. He later went on to coach the Boston Bruins, Calgary Flames and Chicago Blackhawks. Brian won the Jack Adams Award as the NHL's best coach for his contributions to the Blues' performance in 1990–91. He was also the runner-up for the Adams Award with the Bruins in 1992–93 and the Blackhawks in 2001–02. His number 11 is retired by the Blues. Brian was the director of pro personnel for the Calgary Flames organization until he took the head coaching position with the Bentley Generals of the Chinook Hockey League. Brian was formerly the head coach of the Innisfail Eagles Sr. AAA hockey club.

=== Darryl ===
Darryl Sutter was the lowest draft pick of the family, waiting until the 11th round, 179th overall, before being selected by the Chicago Blackhawks in the 1978 NHL entry draft. Darryl's playing career was cut short by injuries in 1987 after which he turned to coaching. Darryl spent 11 seasons coaching the Blackhawks, San Jose Sharks and Calgary Flames, leading the last team to a surprising run to the 7th game of the Stanley Cup Finals as both the coach and general manager in 2003–04. He succeeded Terry Murray as the Los Angeles Kings' head coach on December 17, 2011. He led the Kings to their two Stanley Cup Championships in 2012 and 2014. He was fired by the Kings on April 10, 2017. Upon the firing of Geoff Ward, Darryl was re-hired by the Calgary Flames in March 2021 for his second stint as head coach of the team and the fourth stint a Sutter brother has had coaching the team.

=== Duane ===
Duane Sutter was selected by the New York Islanders, 17th overall, in the 1979 NHL entry draft. He won the Stanley Cup in his first four seasons with the Islanders, the latter two with his brother Brent. Duane also briefly coached the Florida Panthers from 2000 to 2002. On May 21, 2019, the Edmonton Oilers relieved Duane from his head of pro scouting duties. Duane finished his career with 342 points in the NHL.

=== Brent ===
Drafted in the first round, 17th overall by the New York Islanders in the 1980 NHL entry draft, Brent Sutter had the most success in the NHL, playing 1,111 games and recording 829 points. He won the Stanley Cup twice with the Islanders in 1982 and 1983 along with his brother Duane. As a member of the Chicago Blackhawks, he played with his brother Rich and was coached by brother Darryl. After finishing his NHL career, he bought the WHL's Red Deer Rebels where he also formerly served as the Rebels' head coach and general manager. Brent led the Rebels to the Memorial Cup in 2001. He also became the first coach to lead Canada to consecutive gold medals at the World Junior Ice Hockey Championships, which he did in 2005 and 2006. In 2007, Brent left his posts with the Rebels to become the head coach of the New Jersey Devils. On June 23, 2009, he was hired as the head coach of the Calgary Flames. On April 12, 2012, he and the Flames came to an agreement for him to leave the club. His son Brandon was a first round draft pick of the Carolina Hurricanes in 2007. In 2012 Brent returned to the Red Deer Rebels as general manager and head coach. In 2021, Brent stepped down as head coach, remaining as GM.

=== Ron ===
Ron Sutter was the highest draft pick of the family, taken fourth overall by the Philadelphia Flyers in 1982, six spots ahead of his twin brother Rich. Ron played for seven teams during his NHL career. Ron finished his career with the Calgary Flames in 2000–01. Rich and Ron spent three seasons together with the Flyers in the mid-1980s, and three more with the Blues in the early 1990s, where they were coached by brother Brian. During his time with the San Jose Sharks, Ron was coached by brother Darryl. Ron is the only brother who did not play or work for the Chicago Blackhawks.

=== Rich ===
Rich Sutter, twin brother of Ron, was drafted 10th overall by the Pittsburgh Penguins in the 1982 NHL entry draft. He led the Lethbridge Broncos to a WHL championship in 1983 and a Memorial Cup appearance. Rich played 874 games with seven teams during his 13-year career. Throughout his career, he played with brothers Brent and Ron, and was coached by brothers Brian and Darryl. As of the 2020–21 NHL season he is a pro scout for the Columbus Blue Jackets.

=== Career statistics ===
| | | Regular season | | | | | Playoffs |
| Player | Years | GP | G | A | Pts | PIM | GP | G | A | Pts | PIM |
|---|---|---|---|---|---|---|---|---|---|---|---|
| Brian Sutter | 1976–1988 | 779 | 303 | 333 | 636 | 1,786 | 65 | 21 | 21 | 42 | 249 |
| Darryl Sutter | 1979–1987 | 406 | 161 | 118 | 279 | 288 | 51 | 24 | 19 | 43 | 26 |
| Duane Sutter | 1979–1990 | 731 | 139 | 203 | 342 | 1,333 | 161 | 26 | 32 | 58 | 405 |
| Brent Sutter | 1980–1998 | 1,111 | 363 | 466 | 829 | 1,054 | 144 | 30 | 44 | 74 | 164 |
| Rich Sutter | 1982–1995 | 874 | 149 | 166 | 315 | 1,411 | 78 | 13 | 5 | 18 | 133 |
| Ron Sutter | 1982–2001 | 1,093 | 205 | 328 | 533 | 1,352 | 104 | 8 | 32 | 40 | 193 |
| Combined | 1976–2001 | 4,994 | 1,320 | 1,614 | 2,934 | 7,224 | 603 | 122 | 153 | 275 | 1,170 |

== Second generation ==
As of 2024, three second-generation Sutters have played in the NHL: Brandon, Brett, and Brody. One other has played in the WHL, and two others were drafted by NHL teams but have not yet played there.

=== Shaun ===
Shaun Sutter, Brian's son, was drafted by the Calgary Flames in the 4th round, 102nd overall, in the 1998 NHL entry draft but never made it to the NHL. He spent the early stages of his career in the ECHL, before heading to Europe to play in the British Elite Ice Hockey League in 2005 where he played with the Nottingham Panthers, Sheffield Steelers and Belfast Giants. He served as an assistant coach with the Western Hockey League's Regina Pats from 2009 to 2011. Since 2011, Shaun has been employed by the Red Deer Rebels, first as senior scout, then promoted to assistant general manager in 2013.

=== Brett ===
Brett Sutter, Darryl's son, was drafted by the Calgary Flames as the 179th overall pick in the 2005 NHL entry draft. He played pee-wee and midget hockey with the San Jose Jr. Sharks, then went on to captain his uncle Brent's Red Deer Rebels in the Western Hockey League while playing with his cousin Brandon. He made his NHL debut on December 23, 2008, playing against the Anaheim Ducks, and scored a goal while being named the game's third star. He was traded to the Carolina Hurricanes in November 2010, rejoining Brandon, and has spent most of his time since the trade with the Hurricanes' American Hockey League (AHL) affiliate Charlotte Checkers, where he was named team's captain for the 2011–12 season. He was signed by the Minnesota Wild to a two-year, two-way contract on July 1, 2014, and on February 29, 2016, he was traded to the Los Angeles Kings (the team where his father coached) for Scott Sabourin. As of 2023, his most recent NHL action was during the 2014–15 season.

Prior to his retirement on July 15, 2024, Brett Sutter played in 1150 regular-season professional hockey games, with 1090 of them in the AHL, the fourth most of any player in the league's history. Brett would serve as the captain of his respective AHL team for 10 of his 17 seasons in the league, including his final two with the Calgary Wranglers in his home province. Immediately following his retirement announcement, the Wranglers named Brett as an assistant coach for the 2024–25 AHL season.

=== Brandon ===
Brandon Sutter, Brent's son, played for the Carolina Hurricanes, Pittsburgh Penguins and Vancouver Canucks. He also played under his father Brent as a junior with the Red Deer Rebels and Team Canada at the 2007 Super Series. He served as an alternate captain with the Rebels and played with cousin Brett. He was drafted 11th overall, the highest of the second-generation Sutters, in the 2007 NHL entry draft by the Hurricanes, and became the first of the second generation to play in the NHL. He scored his first NHL goal for the Hurricanes on October 23, 2008, against the Penguins. During the 2012 NHL Draft, Brandon was traded to the Penguins, with Brian Dumoulin and the 8th overall pick, for Jordan Staal. He recorded his first career hat trick with the Vancouver Canucks on January 25, 2021, being the first of the second generation to do so.

=== Brody ===
Brody Sutter, Duane's son, was drafted 193rd overall in the 7th round of the 2011 NHL entry draft by the Carolina Hurricanes. He previously played for the Carolina Hurricanes (NHL), Springfield Thunderbirds (AHL), Charlotte Checkers (AHL), Florida Everblades (ECHL), Iserlohn Roosters (DEL), Lethbridge Hurricanes (WHL), Saskatoon Blades (WHL), Calgary Buffaloes (AMHL), and Vienna Capitals (Erste Bank Hockey League). As of 2026, he has been signed as a Skills Coach to the Olds Grizzlies (AJHL).

=== Lukas ===
Lukas Sutter, Rich's son, was born in St. Louis. He played major junior hockey with the Western Hockey League's (WHL) Saskatoon Blades, starting in the 2009–10 season. He was drafted by the Winnipeg Jets with the 39th overall pick in the 2012 NHL entry draft, but did not sign with the club. He was traded to the WHL's Red Deer Rebels for the 2013–14 season, where he was drafted again, this time by the New York Islanders, with the 200th overall pick in the 2014 NHL entry draft. He split the 2014–15 season between their AHL affiliate, the Bridgeport Sound Tigers, and their lower ECHL team, the Stockton Thunder. He played the 2016–17 season with the University of Saskatchewan Huskies and appears to have retired from hockey as of the 2017–18 season.

=== Riley ===
Riley Sutter, Ron's son, was drafted by the Everett Silvertips in the sixth round of the 2014 WHL Bantam Draft. Riley signed with the Silvertips on September 1, 2015. He was then selected by the Washington Capitals in the 2018 NHL entry draft, 93rd overall. As of 2024, he is playing for Washington's AHL affiliate Hershey Bears.

=== Career NHL statistics ===
| | | Regular season | | | | | Playoffs |
| Player | Years | GP | G | A | Pts | PIM | GP | G | A | Pts | PIM |
|---|---|---|---|---|---|---|---|---|---|---|---|
| Brandon Sutter | 2008–2021 | 770 | 152 | 137 | 289 | 149 | 50 | 9 | 9 | 18 | 8 |
| Brett Sutter | 2008–2024 | 60 | 2 | 8 | 10 | 40 | — | — | — | — | — |
| Brody Sutter | 2014–2016 | 12 | 0 | 0 | 0 | 0 | — | — | — | — | — |
| Combined | 2008–2024 | 842 | 154 | 145 | 299 | 189 | 50 | 9 | 9 | 18 | 8 |

== See also ==
- Apps family
- List of family relations in the National Hockey League
