= Rich Sutter =

Canadian ice hockey player

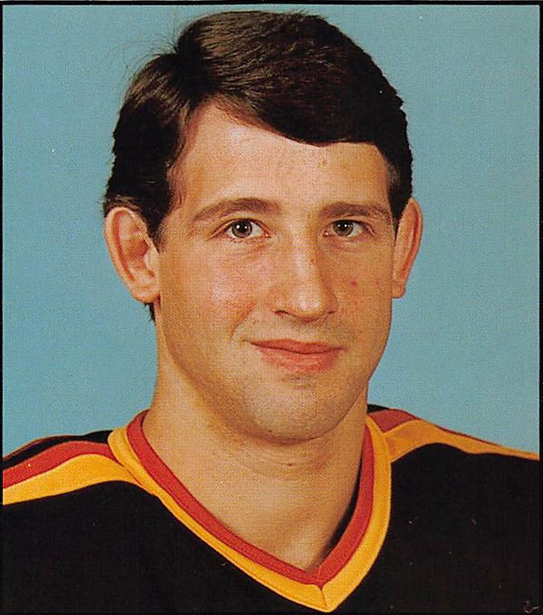
- Sutter in 1986
- Born: December 2, 1963 (age 62) Viking, Alberta, Canada
- Height: 5 ft 11 in (180 cm)
- Weight: 188 lb (85 kg; 13 st 6 lb)
- Position: Right wing
- Shot: Right
- Played for: Pittsburgh Penguins; Philadelphia Flyers; Vancouver Canucks; St. Louis Blues; Chicago Blackhawks; Toronto Maple Leafs; Tampa Bay Lightning
- NHL draft: 10th overall, 1982; Pittsburgh Penguins
- Playing career: 1983–1995

Richard G. Sutter (born December 2, 1963) is a Canadian former professional ice hockey right winger who played 13 seasons in the National Hockey League (NHL) for the Pittsburgh Penguins, Philadelphia Flyers, Vancouver Canucks, St. Louis Blues, Chicago Blackhawks, Toronto Maple Leafs and Tampa Bay Lightning. He is part of the Sutter family, the family that sent six brothers to the NHL. He is the twin brother of Ron Sutter.

== Playing career ==
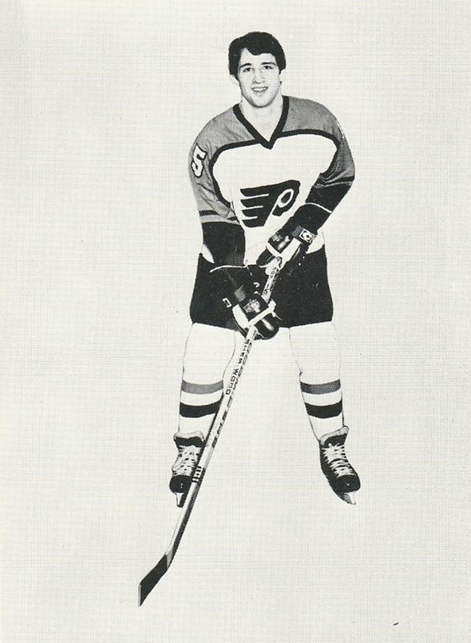
1983-84 photo of Sutter for Philadelphia Flyers

Sutter was drafted 10th overall by the Pittsburgh Penguins in the 1982 NHL entry draft, the same draft that saw his twin brother, Ron, get drafted 4th overall by the Philadelphia Flyers. Ron and Rich both played on the Lethbridge Broncos in the WHL, and together they led that team to the Memorial Cup in 1983. Rich would only play 9 games for the Penguins after Junior, before being traded to Ron's Flyers. Sutter was traded again in 1986 to the Vancouver Canucks. He would play four seasons with the Canucks, before being traded again, this time to the St. Louis Blues. Sutter would play for the Chicago Blackhawks, Tampa Bay Lightning, and Toronto Maple Leafs before retiring in 1995.

== Later life ==
Rich Sutter is currently a hockey analyst for Rogers Sportsnet. Since 2014, he has primarily appeared on Hockey Central's lunch program Hockey Central at Noon, which is simulcast on TV and radio. He also works as a player agent and scout.

== Career statistics ==
			Regular season					Playoffs
Season	Team	League	GP	G	A	Pts	PIM	GP	G	A	Pts	PIM
1979–80	Red Deer Rustlers	AJHL	60	13	19	32	157	—	—	—	—	—
1980–81	Lethbridge Broncos	WHL	72	23	18	41	255	9	3	1	4	35
1981–82	Lethbridge Broncos	WHL	57	38	31	69	263	12	3	3	6	55
1982–83	Lethbridge Broncos	WHL	64	37	30	67	200	17	14	9	23	43
1982–83	Pittsburgh Penguins	NHL	4	0	0	0	0	—	—	—	—	—
1982–83	Lethbridge Broncos	MC	—	—	—	—	—	3	4	2	6	2
1983–84	Pittsburgh Penguins	NHL	5	0	0	0	0	—	—	—	—	—
1983–84	Baltimore Skipjacks	AHL	2	0	1	1	0	—	—	—	—	—
1983–84	Philadelphia Flyers	NHL	70	16	12	28	93	3	0	0	0	15
1984–85	Philadelphia Flyers	NHL	56	6	10	16	89	11	3	0	3	10
1984–85	Hershey Bears	AHL	13	3	7	10	14	—	—	—	—	—
1985–86	Philadelphia Flyers	NHL	78	14	25	39	199	5	2	0	2	19
1986–87	Vancouver Canucks	NHL	74	20	22	42	113	—	—	—	—	—
1987–88	Vancouver Canucks	NHL	80	15	15	30	165	—	—	—	—	—
1988–89	Vancouver Canucks	NHL	75	17	15	32	122	7	2	1	3	12
1989–90	Vancouver Canucks	NHL	62	9	9	18	133	—	—	—	—	—
1989–90	St. Louis Blues	NHL	12	2	0	2	22	12	2	1	3	39
1990–91	St. Louis Blues	NHL	77	16	11	27	122	13	4	2	6	16
1991–92	St. Louis Blues	NHL	77	9	16	25	107	6	0	0	0	8
1992–93	St. Louis Blues	NHL	84	13	14	27	100	11	0	1	1	10
1993–94	Chicago Blackhawks	NHL	83	12	14	26	108	6	0	0	0	2
1994–95	Chicago Blackhawks	NHL	15	0	0	0	28	—	—	—	—	—
1994–95	Tampa Bay Lightning	NHL	4	0	0	0	0	—	—	—	—	—
1994–95	Atlanta Knights	IHL	4	0	5	5	0	—	—	—	—	—
1994–95	Toronto Maple Leafs	NHL	18	0	3	3	10	4	0	0	0	2
NHL totals			874	149	166	315	1411	78	13	5	18	133

== See also ==
- Notable families in the NHL

Preceded by Mike Bullard	Pittsburgh Penguins first-round draft pick 1982	Succeeded by Bob Errey
