= Brian Sutter =

Canadian ice hockey player and coach

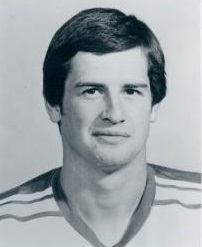
- Sutter with the St. Louis Blues in 1979
- Born: October 7, 1956 (age 69) Viking, Alberta, Canada
- Height: 5 ft 11 in (180 cm)
- Weight: 180 lb (82 kg; 12 st 12 lb)
- Position: Left wing
- Shot: Left
- Played for: St. Louis Blues
- Coached for: St. Louis Blues; Boston Bruins; Calgary Flames; Chicago Blackhawks
- NHL draft: 20th overall, 1976; St. Louis Blues
- WHA draft: 36th overall, 1976; Edmonton Oilers
- Playing career: 1976–1988
- Coaching career: 1988–2004

Brian Louis Allen Sutter (born October 7, 1956) is a Canadian former ice hockey forward and former head coach in the National Hockey League (NHL). Brian is the second oldest of the famous Sutter brothers and the oldest of the six that played in the NHL. He is also the only one to have his number retired by an NHL team.

== Career ==
=== Player ===
Sutter was drafted by the St. Louis Blues during the 2nd round (20th overall) in the 1976 NHL entry draft. He played for the Blues until 1988, when a nagging back injury forced him into retirement. In 12 years with the Blues, he played in three NHL All-Star Games – 1982, 1983, and 1985. For the last nine years of his career, he was the Blues' captain. His jersey, #11, was retired by the St. Louis Blues on December 30, 1988.

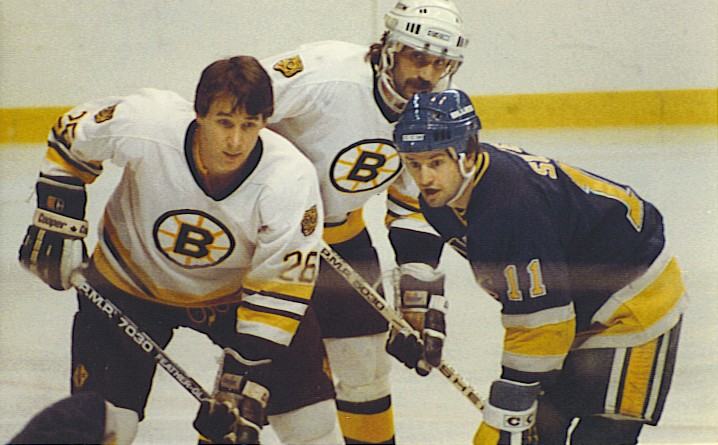
Sutter awaiting a face-off with Mike Milbury (pictured left) and Charlie Simmer (pictured center) of the Boston Bruins at the Boston Garden on March 21, 1985.

=== Coaching ===
Immediately after retiring, he was named the Blues' head coach (1988–1992). In 1991, he won the Jack Adams Award as the NHL's best coach. All told, he spent the first 16 years of his adult life at ice level with the Blues.

Sutter subsequently held head coaching positions with the Boston Bruins, Calgary Flames, and Chicago Blackhawks (2001–2004). On June 21, 2005, the Blackhawks hired Dale Tallon as their new general manager; Tallon and the rebuilding Blackhawks decided not to renew Sutter's contract.

During the 2006–07 season, Sutter coached the Bentley Generals of the Chinook Hockey League, leading the team to its first berth in the Allan Cup, Canada's senior men's hockey championship.

Sutter was named the head coach of the Western Hockey League's Red Deer Rebels on July 12, 2007, replacing his younger brother Brent, who left the Rebels to become the head coach of the NHL's New Jersey Devils. On March 24, 2008, the Rebels announced that Brian Sutter had resigned as head coach of the team, citing personal reasons.

Sutter returned as head coach of the Generals for the 2008–09 season, leading them to its first Allan Cup title in 2009. In August 2012, Sutter left the Generals to become the new head coach of the Innisfail Eagles, also of the Chinook Hockey League. He stepped down as head coach of Innisfail in 2022.

== Personal life ==
Sutter and his wife Judy have two children, a son Shaun and a daughter, Abigail.

== Career statistics ==
=== Regular season and playoffs ===
| | | | Regular season | | | | | Playoffs |
| Season | Team | League | GP | G | A | Pts | PIM | GP | G | A | Pts | PIM |
|---|---|---|---|---|---|---|---|---|---|---|---|---|
| 1972–73 | Red Deer Rustlers | AJHL | 51 | 27 | 40 | 67 | 54 | — | — | — | — | — |
| 1973–74 | Red Deer Rustlers | AJHL | 59 | 42 | 54 | 96 | 139 | — | — | — | — | — |
| 1974–75 | Lethbridge Broncos | WCHL | 53 | 34 | 47 | 81 | 134 | 6 | 0 | 1 | 1 | 39 |
| 1975–76 | Lethbridge Broncos | WCHL | 72 | 36 | 56 | 92 | 233 | 7 | 3 | 4 | 7 | 45 |
| 1976–77 | Kansas City Blues | CHL | 38 | 15 | 23 | 38 | 47 | — | — | — | — | — |
| 1976–77 | St. Louis Blues | NHL | 35 | 4 | 10 | 14 | 82 | 4 | 0 | 1 | 1 | 14 |
| 1977–78 | St. Louis Blues | NHL | 79 | 9 | 13 | 22 | 123 | — | — | — | — | — |
| 1978–79 | St. Louis Blues | NHL | 77 | 41 | 39 | 80 | 165 | — | — | — | — | — |
| 1979–80 | St. Louis Blues | NHL | 71 | 23 | 35 | 58 | 156 | 3 | 0 | 0 | 0 | 4 |
| 1980–81 | St. Louis Blues | NHL | 78 | 35 | 34 | 69 | 232 | 11 | 6 | 3 | 9 | 77 |
| 1981–82 | St. Louis Blues | NHL | 74 | 39 | 36 | 75 | 239 | 10 | 8 | 6 | 14 | 49 |
| 1982–83 | St. Louis Blues | NHL | 79 | 46 | 30 | 76 | 254 | 4 | 2 | 1 | 3 | 10 |
| 1983–84 | St. Louis Blues | NHL | 76 | 32 | 51 | 83 | 162 | 11 | 1 | 5 | 6 | 22 |
| 1984–85 | St. Louis Blues | NHL | 77 | 37 | 37 | 74 | 121 | 3 | 2 | 1 | 3 | 2 |
| 1985–86 | St. Louis Blues | NHL | 44 | 19 | 23 | 42 | 87 | 9 | 1 | 2 | 3 | 22 |
| 1986–87 | St. Louis Blues | NHL | 14 | 3 | 3 | 6 | 18 | — | — | — | — | — |
| 1987–88 | St. Louis Blues | NHL | 76 | 15 | 22 | 37 | 147 | 10 | 0 | 3 | 3 | 49 |
| NHL totals | | | 779 | 303 | 333 | 636 | 1,786 | 65 | 21 | 21 | 42 | 249 |

=== International ===
| Year | Team | Event | GP | G | A | Pts | PIM |
|---|---|---|---|---|---|---|---|
| 1975 | Canada | WJC | 5 | 1 | 4 | 5 | 2 |

== Coaching statistics ==
| Team | Year | Regular season | | | | | | | Postseason |
| Team | Year | G | W | L | T | OTL | Pts | Division rank | Result |
|---|---|---|---|---|---|---|---|---|---|
| STL | 1988–89 | 80 | 33 | 35 | 12 | - | 78 | 2nd in Norris | Won in first round (4-1 vs. MIN); Lost in second round (1-4 vs. CHI) |
| STL | 1989–90 | 80 | 37 | 34 | 9 | - | 83 | 2nd in Norris | Won in first round (4-1 vs. TOR); Lost in second round (3-4 vs. CHI) |
| STL | 1990–91 | 80 | 47 | 22 | 11 | - | 105 | 2nd in Norris | Won in first round (4-3 vs. DET); Lost in second round (2-4 vs. MIN) |
| STL | 1991–92 | 80 | 36 | 33 | 11 | - | 83 | 3rd in Norris | Lost in first round (2-4 vs. CHI) |
| BOS | 1992–93 | 84 | 51 | 26 | 7 | - | 109 | 1st in Adams | Lost in first round (0-4 vs. BUF) |
| BOS | 1993–94 | 84 | 42 | 29 | 13 | - | 97 | 2nd in Adams | Won in first round (4-3 vs. MTL); Lost in second round (2-4 vs. NJ) |
| BOS | 1994–95 | 48 | 27 | 18 | 3 | - | 57 | 3rd in Adams | Lost in first round (1-4 vs. NJ) |
| CGY | 1997–98 | 82 | 26 | 41 | 15 | - | 67 | 5th in Pacific | Missed playoffs |
| CGY | 1998–99 | 82 | 30 | 40 | 12 | - | 72 | 3rd in Northwest | Missed playoffs |
| CGY | 1999–2000 | 82 | 31 | 36 | 10 | 5 | 77 | 4th in Northwest | Missed playoffs |
| CHI | 2001–02 | 82 | 41 | 27 | 13 | 1 | 96 | 3rd in Central | Lost in first round (1-4 vs. STL) |
| CHI | 2002–03 | 82 | 30 | 33 | 13 | 6 | 79 | 3rd in Central | Missed playoffs |
| CHI | 2003–04 | 82 | 20 | 43 | 11 | 8 | 59 | 5th in Central | Missed playoffs |
| Total | | 1,028 | 451 | 417 | 140 | 20 | 1,062 | 1 Division Title | 28-40 (.411) |

== See also ==
- List of NHL head coaches
- Notable families in the NHL

| Preceded by Barry Gibbs | St. Louis Blues captain 1979–88 | Succeeded by Bernie Federko |
| Preceded by Bob Murdoch | Jack Adams Award winners 1991 | Succeeded by Pat Quinn |
| Preceded by Jacques Martin | Head coach of the St. Louis Blues; 1988–92 | Succeeded by Bob Plager |
| Preceded by Rick Bowness | Head coach of the Boston Bruins; 1992–95 | Succeeded by Steve Kasper |
| Preceded by Pierre Page | Head coach of the Calgary Flames; 1997–2000 | Succeeded by Don Hay |
| Preceded by Alpo Suhonen | Head coach of the Chicago Blackhawks; 2001–04 | Succeeded by Trent Yawney |
