= Duane Sutter =

Canadian ice hockey player and coach

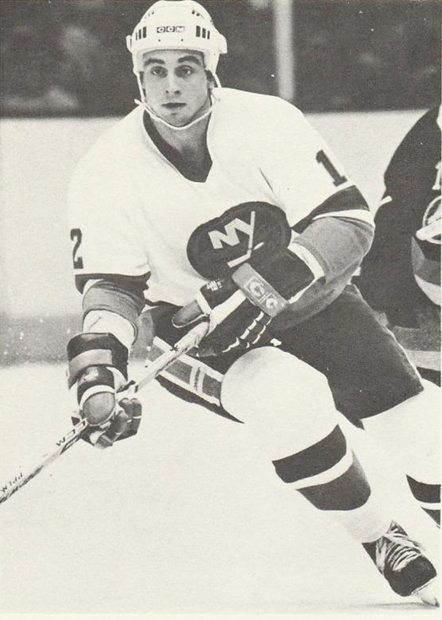
- Born: March 16, 1960 (age 66) Viking, Alberta, Canada
- Height: 6 ft 1 in (185 cm)
- Weight: 190 lb (86 kg; 13 st 8 lb)
- Position: Right wing
- Shot: Right
- Played for: New York Islanders; Chicago Blackhawks
- NHL draft: 17th overall, 1979; New York Islanders
- Playing career: 1979–1990

Duane Calvin Sutter (born March 16, 1960) is a Canadian former National Hockey League (NHL) player and head coach. Sutter was a first-round pick in 1979 and made the major league early in the 1979-80 season with the Islanders and played in all 21 playoff games, where he scored a goal in the decisive game six of the Stanley Cup Final as the Islanders won the first of four consecutive Stanley Cups. Sutter had the most points (7) for all players in the 1983 Final and 21 in total for the playoffs for New York's fourth championship. As a player, Sutter had seven seasons with 100+ penalty minutes and two 50-point seasons. After leaving the Islanders in 1987, he played for the Chicago Blackhawks from 1987 to 1990 before retiring. In eleven seasons as a player, he never missed the playoffs.

He became a scout in 1990 with Chicago and later became a head coach in the WHL and IHL before becoming an assistant coach of the Florida Panthers in 1996. He served as interim head coach of the Panthers in the middle of the 2000-01 season and coached the team until he was fired in the middle of the 2001-02 season. He remained associated with the Panthers in player development until 2008 when he left to serve as director of player personnel in 2008 for the Calgary Flames. He departed for the Edmonton Oilers to be a pro scout in 2011, later becoming Vice President of player personnel in 2016 until he was let go in 2019.

He is one of the famed six Sutter brothers to play in the NHL.

== Career ==
Duane was drafted by the New York Islanders in 1979 in the first round (17th overall). During the following season he made his debut for the Islanders, and as a rookie was a key contributor to the Islanders first Stanley Cup championship. Duane Sutter, who was dubbed "Dog" by his teammates because he yapped and barked before and during games, also contributed to the ensuing 1981, 1982 and 1983 Stanley Cup championships. Playing in the corners of the rink, Duane Sutter was tough but skillful. Sutter had an underrated passing ability and scoring touch.

In the 1980–81 season he was joined by his younger brother, Brent, on the team and they played together until Duane was traded to the Chicago Blackhawks in 1987. Duane and Brent won two of their Stanley Cups together in 1982 and 1983.

After the 1983 Cup win, Duane had the distinction of winning four Stanley Cup championships in his first four seasons of the NHL. He and Brent led all players with 7 and 5 points during the first three games of that series.

He played for the Blackhawks for three seasons, but after the 1989–90 season he retired.

== Personnel career ==
Sutter became part of the coaching staff in the Florida Panthers, starting as an assistant coach in 1996. He became interim coach in 2001 and was retained for the remainder of the 2000-01 season. He was the coach to start the 2001-02 season before he was fired for Mike Keenan in December 2001. He remained involved with the Panthers as director of player development until 2008 when he joined the Calgary Flames, who happened to be coached by his brother Darryl. At one point in time, the Flames had four Sutter brothers (Duane, Darryl, Brent and Ron) all involved with the organization. He served as director of player personnel. He was fired in June 2011.

Duane made a guest appearance in the Canadian television series, Road Hockey Rumble playing himself. He is confronted by the two hosts of the show hoping to win him over as a fan.

He became a scout for the Edmonton Oilers. He was promoted to Vice President of Player Personnel in 2016. In 2019, he was let go from the Oilers.

== Personal life ==
Duane's son Brody, is a former forward for the Western Hockey League's Lethbridge Hurricanes, and a former forward with the Manitoba Moose in the AHL. Currently playing in the DEL European League for the Iserlohn Roosters (2020–21).

== Career statistics ==
			Regular season					Playoffs
Season	Team	League	GP	G	A	Pts	PIM	GP	G	A	Pts	PIM
1976–77	Red Deer Rustlers	AJHL	60	9	26	35	76	—	—	—	—	—
1976–77	Lethbridge Broncos	WCHL	1	0	1	1	2	8	0	1	1	15
1977–78	Red Deer Rustlers	AJHL	59	47	53	100	218	—	—	—	—	—
1977–78	Lethbridge Broncos	WCHL	5	1	5	6	19	8	1	4	5	10
1978–79	Lethbridge Broncos	WHL	71	50	75	125	212	19	11	12	23	42
1979–80	Lethbridge Broncos	WHL	21	18	16	34	74	—	—	—	—	—
1979–80	New York Islanders	NHL	56	15	9	24	55	21	3	7	10	74
1980–81	New York Islanders	NHL	23	7	11	18	26	12	3	1	4	10
1981–82	New York Islanders	NHL	77	18	35	53	100	19	5	5	10	57
1982–83	New York Islanders	NHL	75	13	19	32	118	20	9	12	21	43
1983–84	New York Islanders	NHL	78	17	23	40	94	21	1	3	4	48
1984–85	New York Islanders	NHL	78	17	24	41	174	10	0	2	2	47
1985–86	New York Islanders	NHL	80	20	33	53	157	3	0	0	0	16
1986–87	New York Islanders	NHL	80	14	17	31	169	14	0	1	1	26
1987–88	Chicago Blackhawks	NHL	37	7	9	16	70	5	0	0	0	21
1988–89	Chicago Blackhawks	NHL	75	7	9	16	214	16	3	1	4	15
1989–90	Chicago Blackhawks	NHL	72	4	14	18	156	20	1	1	2	48
NHL totals			731	139	203	342	1333	161	26	32	58	405

== Coaching record ==
Team	Year	Regular season							Postseason
Team	Year	G	W	L	T	OTL	Pts	Finish	Result
FLA	2000–01	46	16	20	6	4	(66)	3rd in Southeast	Missed playoffs
FLA	2001–02	26	6	15	2	3	(60)	(fired)	—
Total		72	22	35	8	7			

== See also ==
- List of NHL head coaches
- Notable families in the NHL

Preceded by Steve Tambellini	New York Islanders first-round draft pick 1979	Succeeded by Brent Sutter
Preceded by Terry Murray	Head coach of the Florida Panthers; 2000–02	Succeeded by Mike Keenan
