= Eric Staal =

Canadian ice hockey player (born 1984)

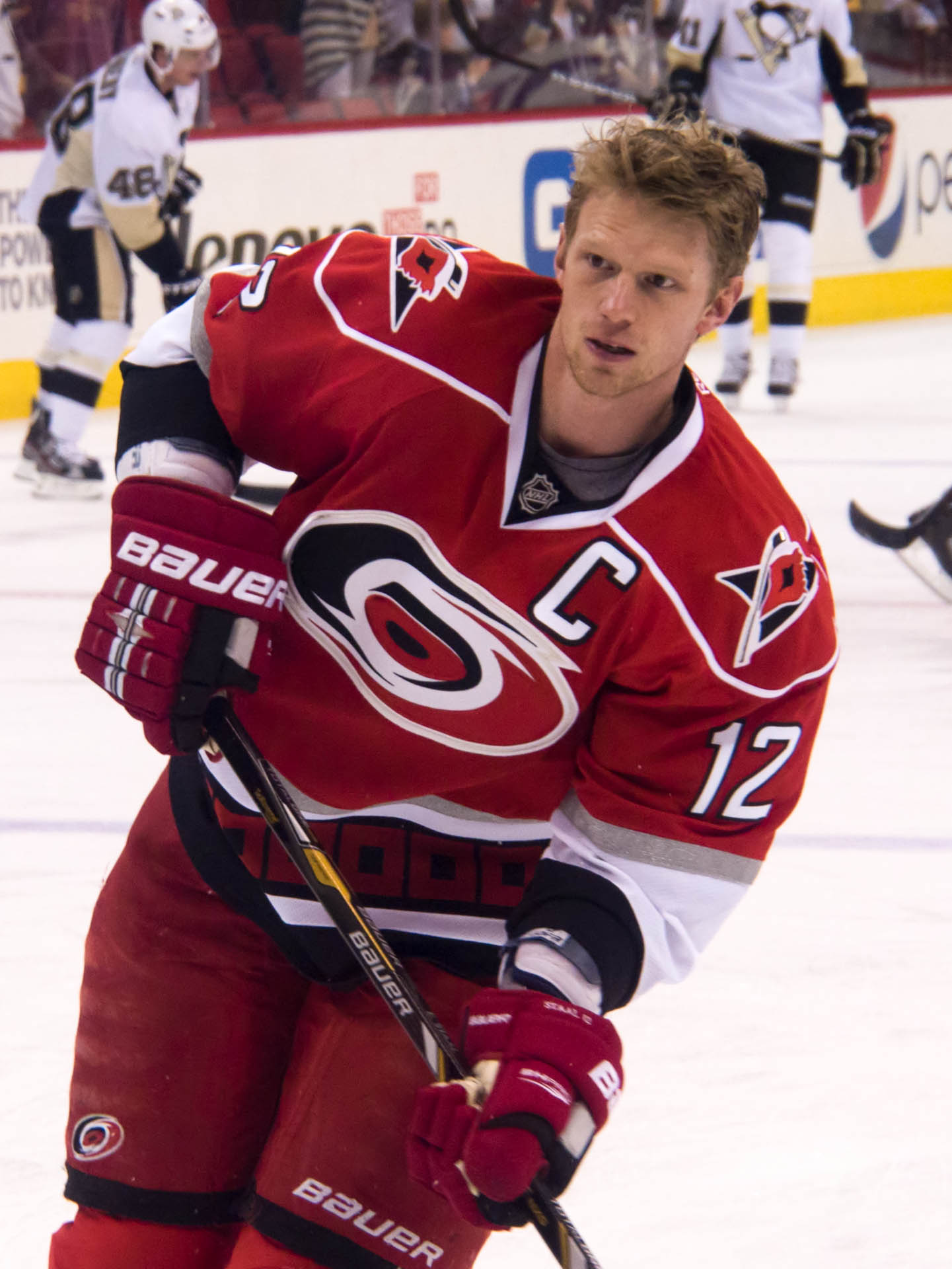
- Staal with the Carolina Hurricanes in 2013
- Born: October 29, 1984 (age 42) Thunder Bay, Ontario, Canada
- Height: 6 ft 4 in (193 cm)
- Weight: 195 lb (88 kg; 13 st 13 lb)
- Position: Centre
- Shot: Left
- Played for: Carolina Hurricanes; New York Rangers; Minnesota Wild; Buffalo Sabres; Montreal Canadiens; Florida Panthers
- National team: Canada
- NHL draft: 2nd overall, 2003; Carolina Hurricanes
- Playing career: 2003–2023

Eric Craig Staal (born October 29, 1984) is a Canadian former professional ice hockey centre who played eighteen seasons in the National Hockey League (NHL) for the Carolina Hurricanes, New York Rangers, Minnesota Wild, Buffalo Sabres, Montreal Canadiens, and Florida Panthers. Eric is the oldest of the Staal brothers, who include former teammates Marc, Jordan, and Jared.

Drafted second overall in 2003 by the Hurricanes, he played in the NHL YoungStars Game and recorded 11 goals. After playing the 2004–05 season in the AHL due to the NHL lockout, Staal scored 45 goals and recorded his only 100-point season in the 2005–06 season; in the 2006 Stanley Cup playoffs, he had nine goals and nineteen assists for 28 points, leading the league in the latter two categories as the Hurricanes won the Stanley Cup Final. He became captain of the team in 2010 and served in the position for six years. In his twelve seasons with Carolina, he recorded two 40-goal seasons and three other 30-goal seasons. He was traded to the Rangers late in the 2015–16 season before signing as a free agent with the Wild in 2016; he scored his 400th career goal in 2018 and recorded his 1,000th career point in 2019. He was traded to the Sabres in 2020 and Canadiens in 2021, reaching the Stanley Cup Final with the latter team. He signed a contract to play with the Panthers in 2022 and reached the Stanley Cup Final in 2023, scoring a goal to set a record for the longest gap in goals scored by a player in Final history. A six-time selection to the NHL All-Star Game, Staal retired in 2024 and had his jersey retired by the Hurricanes in 2025, becoming the fourth player in franchise history to receive the honor.

Staal is a member of the Triple Gold Club, having won the Stanley Cup with the Hurricanes in 2006, and both the 2007 World Championships and the 2010 Winter Olympics with Team Canada.

== Early life ==
Staal was born in Thunder Bay, Ontario, the son of sod farmers Henry and Linda Staal. All four of his grandparents were Dutch immigrants. He started playing hockey at the age of four, and along with learning how to operate farming tools he played in a home ice rink with his three younger brothers. His idols growing up were forwards Joe Sakic and Wayne Gretzky. Staal took his jersey number 12 from what his father wore when he played hockey for the Lakehead Thunderwolves from 1978 to 1983.

== Playing career ==
=== Early career ===
Staal grew up playing minor hockey in Thunder Bay, played AAA for the Thunder Bay Kings organization and led his Bantam team to an All-Ontario Championship in the 1999–2000 season. After the season, Staal was selected in the first round, 13th overall, in the 2000 Ontario Hockey League (OHL) Priority Selection by the Peterborough Petes. While not even his father, Henry, thought he may have been ready for the OHL, Staal finished his first season with 49 points in 63 games. His scoring totals increased the following season when he recorded 62 points.

In his draft year, Staal led the Petes in scoring with 39 goals and 98 points. He was named to the Canadian Hockey League (CHL) First All-Star Team as well as the OHL Second All-Star Team. Staal also skated in the CHL Top Prospects Game, recording one assist.

=== Professional ===
==== Carolina Hurricanes (2003–2016) ====
Staal was selected second overall in the 2003 NHL entry draft by the Carolina Hurricanes, behind number one pick Marc-André Fleury. He played his first season in the NHL right after being drafted. In 2004, Staal played in the YoungStars Game as part of the 2004 NHL All-Star festivities.

As the 2004–05 season was cancelled due to a lock-out, Staal spent the year with the Hurricanes' American Hockey League (AHL) affiliate, the Lowell Lock Monsters. He established new franchise records in points (77), assists (51), plus-minus (+37) and shorthanded goals (7) in a season, and was also called for the AHL All Star Classic.

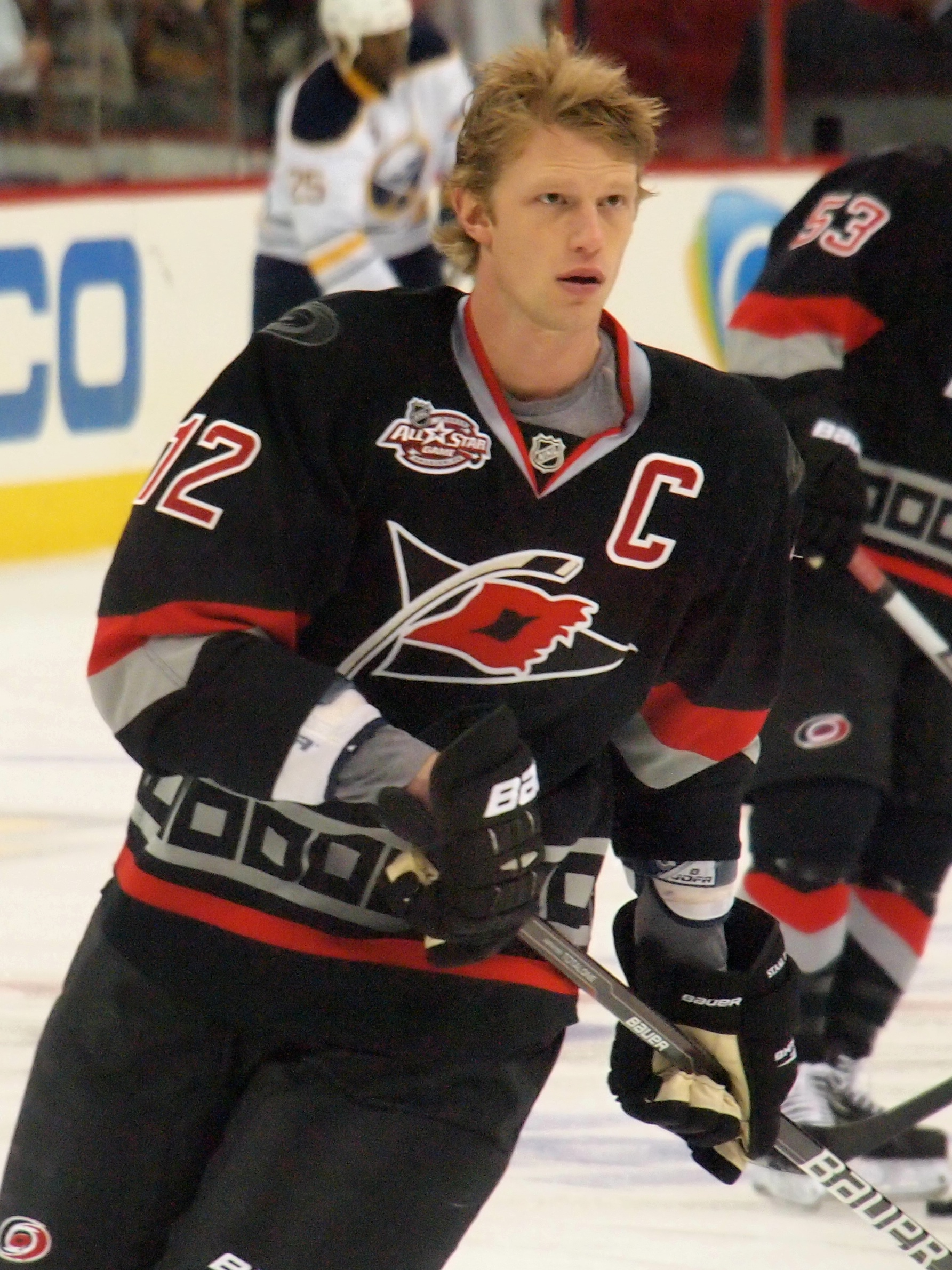
Staal with the Hurricanes in 2011.

In the 2005–06 season, Staal scored a career-high 100 points during the regular season and was named NHL Offensive Player of the Week of October 23–30, 2005, the same week in which he scored his first career hat-trick, coming against the Philadelphia Flyers. He then led the Hurricanes in points during the 2006 Stanley Cup playoffs with 28 as they won the Stanley Cup. After the season, Staal finished fourth in voting for the Hart Memorial Trophy, awarded to the NHL's most valuable player (MVP). Following the successful season, on July 1, 2006, Staal signed a three-year, $13.5 million contract extension with the Hurricanes.

Staal made his first All-Star Game appearance in 2007 All-Star Game in Dallas, where he scored the Eastern Conference's third goal. His overall production dipped from the previous season, recording just 70 points.

On January 27, 2008, at the 2008 NHL All-Star Game in Atlanta, Staal recorded two goals and an assist. He was also awarded the MVP award for the event.

On September 11, 2008, Staal signed a seven-year, $57.75 million extension with the Hurricanes, which was to begin in the 2009–10 season. Staal was slated to become a restricted free agent on July 1, 2009, but signed despite having one year at $5 million remaining on his former contract.

On April 28, 2009, Staal capped an improbable comeback by scoring the series-winning goal with 31.7 seconds remaining in game seven of Carolina's first-round series of the 2009 playoffs against the New Jersey Devils. His game-winning goal led to the comeback victory being nicknamed “"Shock at the Rock". The Hurricanes went as far as the Eastern Conference Final, ultimately losing to the eventual Stanley Cup champions, the Pittsburgh Penguins.

On May 8, 2009, Staal scored twice to earn 40 career post-season points, eclipsing Ron Francis' franchise mark of 39.

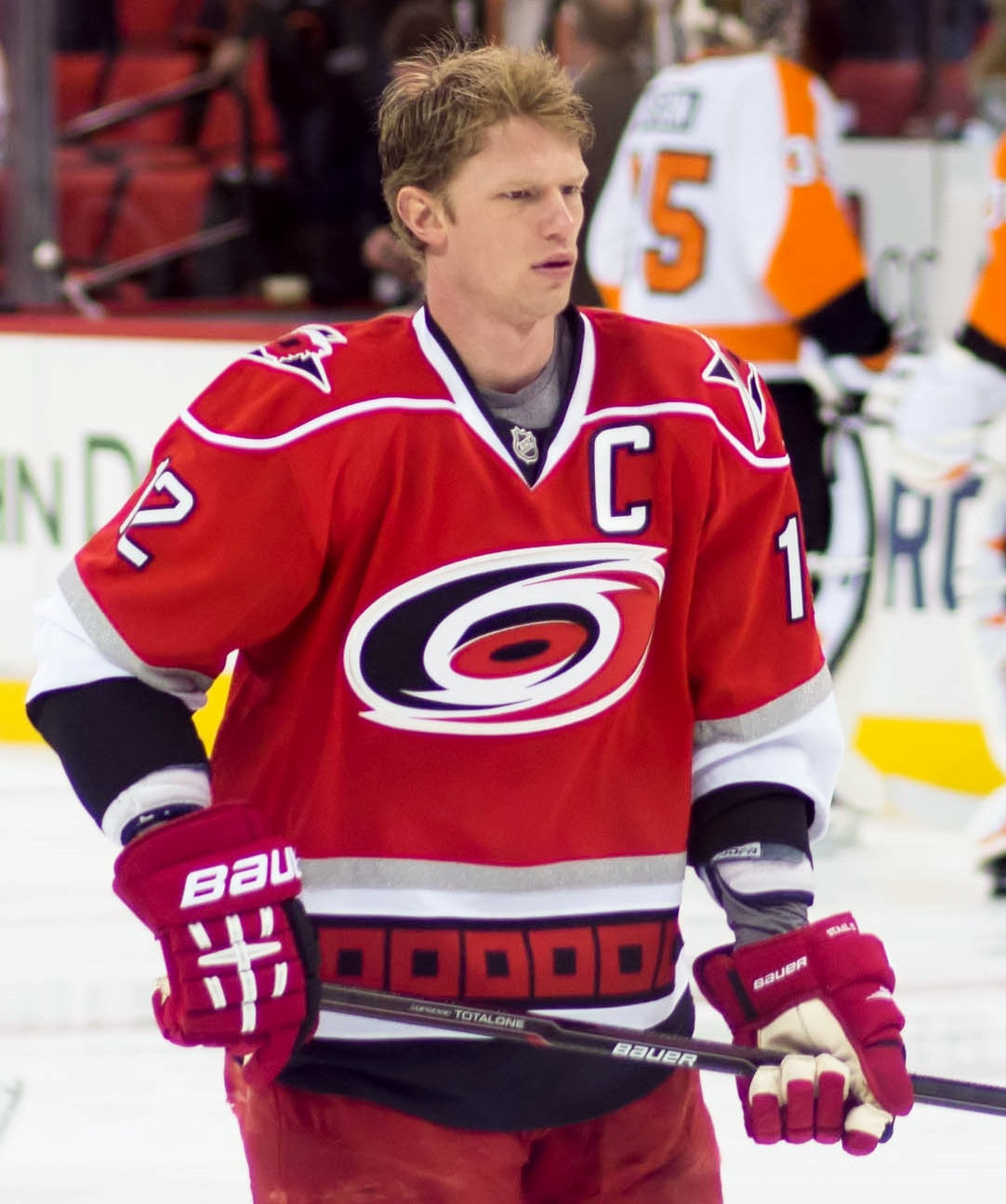
Staal in warm-ups for the Hurricanes in 2013.

On January 20, 2010, Staal was named team captain, replacing Rod Brind'Amour, who was named an alternate captain. Staal became the fifth captain since the team relocated to the city of Raleigh, North Carolina, from Hartford.

On January 18, 2011, Staal was named one of two team captains for 2011 NHL All-Star Game, held in the Hurricanes' home city of Raleigh. In the Game, Team Staal fell 10–11 to Team Lidstrom, captained by the Detroit Red Wings' Nicklas Lidström.

==== New York Rangers (2016) ====
On February 28, 2016, Staal, in the final year of his contract, was traded to the New York Rangers in exchange for Aleksi Saarela and two second-round draft picks (2016 and 2017). Eric joined brother Marc in New York, but struggled for the Rangers, recording six points in 20 regular season games, and zero points in a five-game loss to the Pittsburgh Penguins in the first round of the Stanley Cup Playoffs.

==== Minnesota Wild (2016–2020) ====
During the subsequent offseason, Staal, as a free agent, signed a three-year contract with the Minnesota Wild on July 1, 2016. In his first season with the Wild, Staal recorded 28 goals and 65 points.

The 2017–18 season was a memorable one for Staal as he played his 1,000th game on March 19, 2017, and was also invited to his fifth NHL All-Star Game. Staal ended the season registering 42 goals, having his first 40 plus goal season since 2008–09.

On February 25, 2019, Staal agreed to a two-year, $6.5 million extension with the Wild. On December 15, 2019, Staal became the 89th player all-time to score 1000 career points.

==== Buffalo Sabres (2020–2021) ====
After completing his fourth season with the Wild and entering his final season under contract, Staal was traded by Minnesota to the Buffalo Sabres in exchange for forward Marcus Johansson on September 16, 2020.

==== Montreal Canadiens (2021) ====
On March 26, 2021, the Buffalo Sabres traded Staal to the Montreal Canadiens in exchange for third and fifth-round picks in the 2021 NHL entry draft. He helped the Canadiens get to the 2021 Stanley Cup Final, even scoring two game-winning goals in the playoffs.

==== Iowa Wild (2022) ====
As a free agent from the Canadiens, Staal remained un-signed leading into the 2021–22 season. Harbouring ambitions to represent Team Canada at the 2022 Winter Olympics, Staal resumed his professional career by agreeing to a professional try-out contract with the Iowa Wild of the AHL, an affiliate of former club the Minnesota Wild, on January 13, 2022. Staal made his debut for Iowa the following day, collecting a goal and assist against the Chicago Wolves in marking his first AHL game in over 16 years. In 4 appearances with the Iowa Wild, Staal collected 2 goals and 5 points before he was released from his tryout on January 23, 2022.

==== Florida Panthers and retirement (2022–2023) ====
Staal did not play an NHL game in the 2021–22 season. In July 2022, Staal signed a professional tryout contract (PTO) with the Florida Panthers, joining along with his brother Marc. Shortly after that, Staal signed a one-year contract with Florida. In March 2023, Eric, along with his brother Marc, refused to wear Pride-themed jerseys in the pre-game warmups as a part of the Panthers' annual Pride Night; they cited their Christian faith as the reason for their decision, despite Eric wearing a Pride-themed jersey as a member of the Montreal Canadiens during the 2020–21 NHL season. The rest of the Florida Panthers team members wore the jerseys during warmups to be later auctioned for charity. With the Panthers reaching the 2023 Stanley Cup Final, Staal played for the championship for the third time in his career, and by scoring the first goal in the series, made it 17 years between goals in the Final, beating Mark Recchi by two years for the longest goal gap in Final history.

On July 30, 2024, Staal signed a one-day contract with the Hurricanes and retired from professional hockey. On January 12, 2025 the Hurricanes retired Staal's number 12, joining Glen Wesley, Ron Francis, and Rod Brind’Amour in having their jerseys retired.

== International play ==
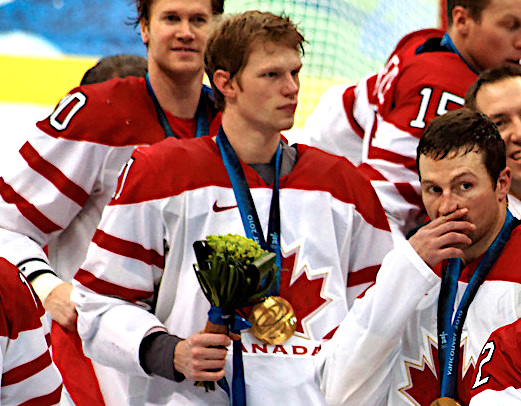
- Staal at the 2010 Winter Olympics

Medal record

Representing Canada

Men's ice hockey

Olympic Winter Games
Gold medal – first place	2010 Vancouver	

World Championships
Gold medal – first place	2007 Moscow	
Silver medal – second place	2008 Halifax / Quebec City	

Staal received his first calls to Team Canada for the 2007 World Championships in Moscow. Along with younger brother Jordan, he won gold in a 4–2 win against Finland, scoring five goals, including the overtime winner in the quarter-finals over the Czech Republic. In the following year, Staal was back with Team Canada at the 2008 World Championships in Quebec City, winning a silver medal. He scored eight goals in the tournament, four of them in Canada's 10–1 defeat of Germany.

Four years after being named only for Canada's taxi squad for the 2006 Winter Olympics, Staal was selected for the Canadian team at the 2010 Winter Olympics in Vancouver. He became a starter alongside Sidney Crosby and Jarome Iginla, and scored one goal and five assists on the path to a gold medal. The Olympic title added to previous NHL and World Championship wins, made Staal the 23rd player in the Triple Gold Club.

Staal was named captain of Team Canada in the 2013 World Championships in Stockholm. He would get injured in the first period of the quarter-finals, which Canada ended up losing to eventual champions Sweden, after a knee-on-knee hit by defenceman Alexander Edler.

In 2022, Staal captained Team Canada to a sixth-place finish at the 2022 Winter Olympics.

== Personal life ==
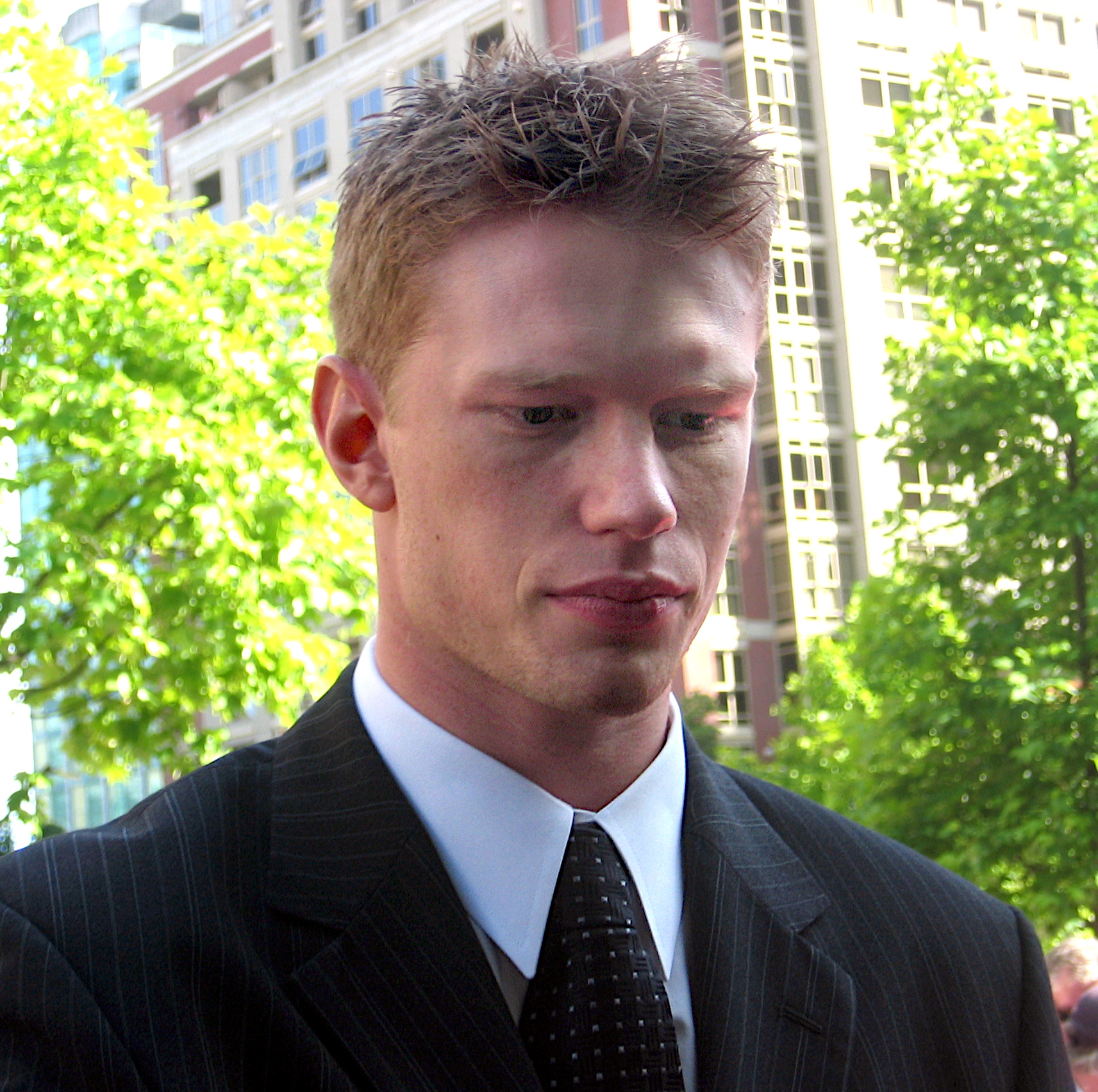
Staal at the NHL Awards in 2006

Staal married his longtime girlfriend, Tanya Van den Broeke on August 3, 2007. The couple have three sons. Staal is Christian.

In 2012, the Staal brothers created the Staal Family Foundation, an organization that tries “to help improve the quality of life for children with cancer and their families.”

== Records ==
- Carolina Hurricanes' franchise record for most hat tricks in a single season – 4 (2008–09)
- Carolina Hurricanes' franchise record for most career post-season points – 43
- Carolina Hurricanes' franchise record for consecutive games – 349 (2004–2009)

== Career statistics ==
=== Regular season and playoffs ===
Bold indicates led league

			Regular season					Playoffs
Season	Team	League	GP	G	A	Pts	PIM	GP	G	A	Pts	PIM
1999–2000	Thunder Bay Kings Bantam AAA	Bantam	59	48	52	100	33	—	—	—	—	—
2000–01	Peterborough Petes	OHL	63	19	30	49	23	7	2	5	7	4
2001–02	Peterborough Petes	OHL	56	23	39	62	40	6	3	6	9	10
2002–03	Peterborough Petes	OHL	66	39	59	98	36	7	5	9	14	6
2003–04	Carolina Hurricanes	NHL	81	11	20	31	40	—	—	—	—	—
2004–05	Lowell Lock Monsters	AHL	77	26	51	77	88	11	2	8	10	12
2005–06	Carolina Hurricanes	NHL	82	45	55	100	81	25	9	**19**	**28**	8
2006–07	Carolina Hurricanes	NHL	82	30	40	70	68	—	—	—	—	—
2007–08	Carolina Hurricanes	NHL	82	38	44	82	50	—	—	—	—	—
2008–09	Carolina Hurricanes	NHL	82	40	35	75	50	18	10	5	15	4
2009–10	Carolina Hurricanes	NHL	70	29	41	70	68	—	—	—	—	—
2010–11	Carolina Hurricanes	NHL	81	33	43	76	72	—	—	—	—	—
2011–12	Carolina Hurricanes	NHL	82	24	46	70	48	—	—	—	—	—
2012–13	Carolina Hurricanes	NHL	48	18	35	53	54	—	—	—	—	—
2013–14	Carolina Hurricanes	NHL	79	21	40	61	74	—	—	—	—	—
2014–15	Carolina Hurricanes	NHL	77	23	31	54	41	—	—	—	—	—
2015–16	Carolina Hurricanes	NHL	63	10	23	33	32	—	—	—	—	—
2015–16	New York Rangers	NHL	20	3	3	6	2	5	0	0	0	4
2016–17	Minnesota Wild	NHL	82	28	37	65	34	5	0	1	1	0
2017–18	Minnesota Wild	NHL	82	42	34	76	42	5	1	1	2	2
2018–19	Minnesota Wild	NHL	81	22	30	52	34	—	—	—	—	—
2019–20	Minnesota Wild	NHL	66	19	28	47	28	4	1	4	5	2
2020–21	Buffalo Sabres	NHL	32	3	7	10	8	—	—	—	—	—
2020–21	Montreal Canadiens	NHL	21	2	1	3	2	21	2	6	8	6
2021–22	Iowa Wild	AHL	4	2	3	5	0	—	—	—	—	—
2022–23	Florida Panthers	NHL	72	14	15	29	26	21	2	3	5	12
NHL totals			1,365	455	608	1,063	854	104	25	39	64	38

=== International ===
Year	Team	Event	Result	GP	G	A	Pts	PIM
2001	Canada	U18	1st place, gold medalist(s)	5	0	0	0	7
2002	Canada	WJC18	6th	8	2	5	7	4
2007	Canada	WC	1st place, gold medalist(s)	9	5	5	10	6
2008	Canada	WC	2nd place, silver medalist(s)	8	4	3	7	6
2010	Canada	OG	1st place, gold medalist(s)	7	1	5	6	6
2013	Canada	WC	5th	8	0	3	3	4
2022	Canada	OG	6th	5	1	3	4	4
Junior totals				13	2	5	7	11
Senior totals				37	11	19	30	26

== Awards and honours ==
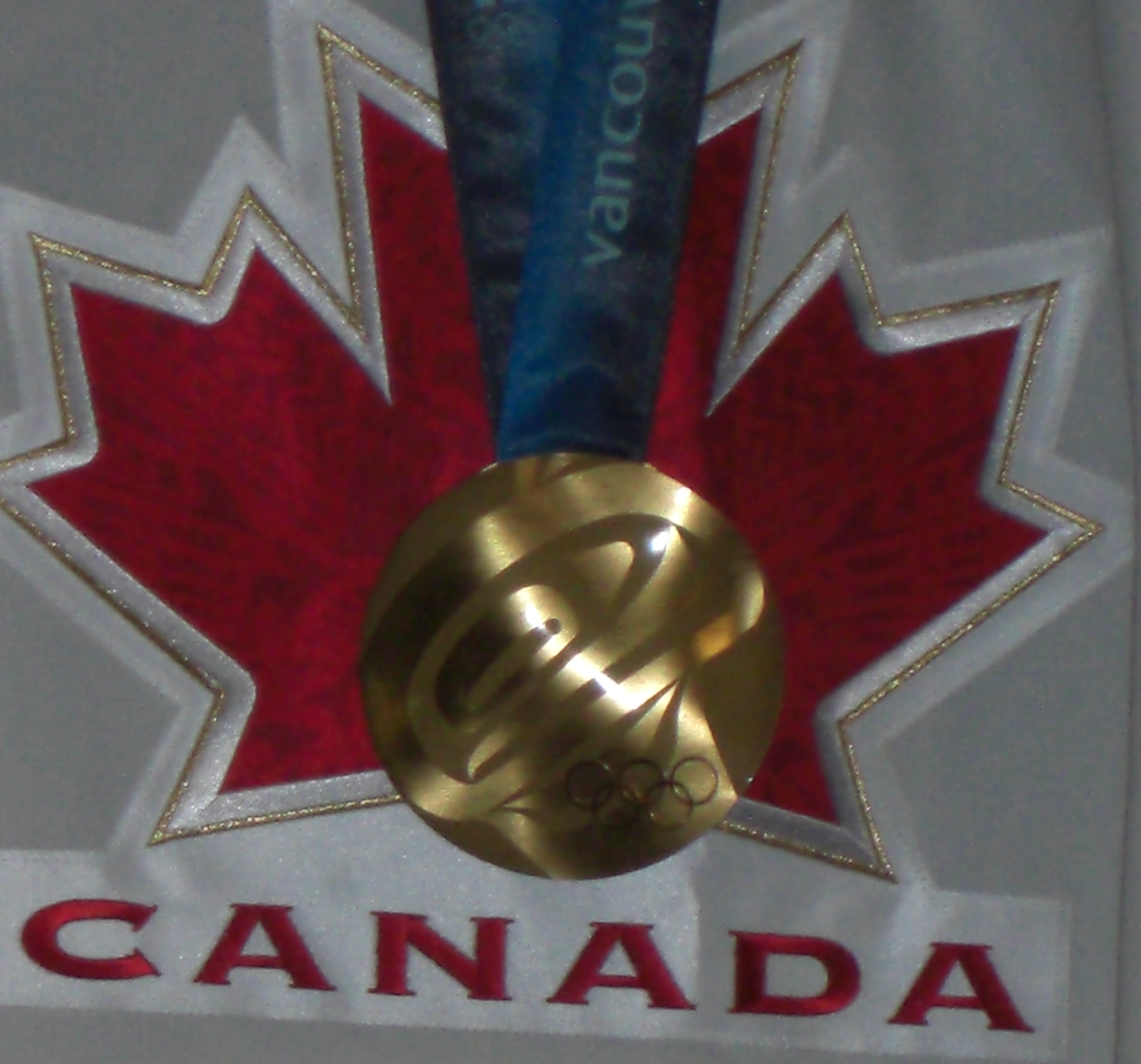
Closeup of Staal's gold medal from the 2010 Winter Olympics

Award	Year
CHL
OHL Top Prospect Award	2003
OHL Second All-Star Team	2003
Top Prospects Game	2003
CHL First All-Star Team	2003
AHL
AHL All-Star Game	2005
Best Plus/Minus	2005
NHL
NHL YoungStars Game	2004
Stanley Cup champion	2006
NHL Second All-Star Team	2006
NHL All-Star Game	2007, 2008, 2009, 2011, 2018, 2020
EA Sports NHL cover athlete	2008
NHL All-Star Game MVP	2008

== See also ==
- List of NHL players with 100-point seasons
- List of NHL players with 1,000 points
- List of NHL players with 1,000 games played

Preceded by Cam Ward	Carolina Hurricanes first-round draft pick 2003	Succeeded by Andrew Ladd
Preceded by Rod Brind'Amour	Carolina Hurricanes captain 2010–2016	Succeeded by Justin Faulk; Jordan Staal
