= Jordan Staal =

Canadian ice hockey player (born 1988)

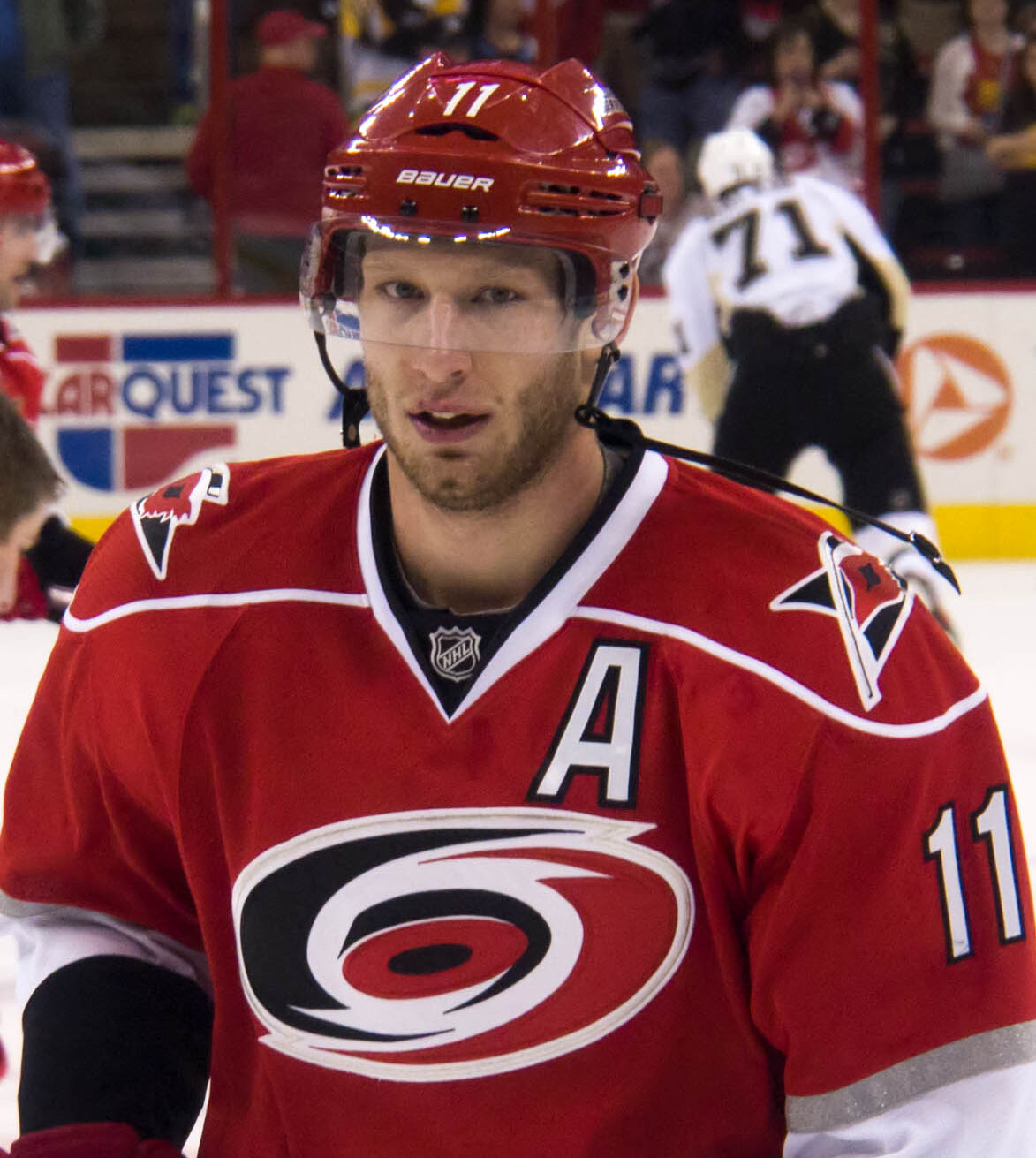
- Staal with the Carolina Hurricanes in 2013
- Born: September 10, 1988 (age 38) Thunder Bay, Ontario, Canada
- Height: 6 ft 4 in (193 cm)
- Weight: 220 lb (100 kg; 15 st 10 lb)
- Position: Centre
- Shoots: Left
- NHL team Former teams: Carolina Hurricanes; Pittsburgh Penguins
- National team: Canada
- NHL draft: 2nd overall, 2006; Pittsburgh Penguins
- Playing career: 2006–present

Jordan Staal (STAWL; born September 10, 1988) is a Canadian professional ice hockey player who is a centre and captain for the Carolina Hurricanes of the National Hockey League (NHL). He is regarded as a premier penalty-killer and skilled two-way forward. In 2007, he became the youngest player (18 years and 153 days) to score a hat trick in league history.

Staal grew up playing minor ice hockey for the Thunder Bay Kings AAA organization. After his minor midget year, Staal was selected in the first round (second overall) by the Peterborough Petes. After a two-year Ontario Hockey League (OHL) career, in which he won a J. Ross Robertson Cup and appeared in the 2006 Memorial Cup with the Petes, Staal was drafted second overall by the Pittsburgh Penguins in the 2006 NHL entry draft, becoming the second Staal in the NHL after older brother Eric was drafted second overall in the 2003 NHL entry draft. He made the immediate jump from junior to the NHL after being drafted and set several NHL records in his rookie season, including youngest player to score on a penalty shot, to score two shorthanded goals in one game, to score a hat trick and the most shorthanded goals by a rookie in one season. Staal was also a Calder Memorial Trophy nominee and was named to the NHL All-Rookie Team.

Among his former Penguins teammates, Staal was known as "Gronk". The nickname, a reference to a Marvel comic book supervillain, was given to him by former Penguins teammate Colby Armstrong, because of his strong on-ice presence. Staal won the Stanley Cup as a member of the Penguins in 2009, scoring two goals and an assist in the seven-game series against the Detroit Red Wings. One year prior, he lost the 2008 final against the same Red Wings. In 2026, he captained the Hurricanes to a Stanley Cup championship, being awarded the Conn Smythe Trophy as the playoffs Most Valuable Player, becoming the oldest player to win the award.

Jordan is one of the four Staal brothers, who have all played or are currently playing professional ice hockey in the NHL. The eldest, Eric, also played for (and captained) the Hurricanes until February 28, 2016. The youngest and fourth brother, Jared, made his NHL debut on April 25, 2013, on a line together with Jordan and Eric before retiring in 2017. The second-eldest, Marc, played defence for the New York Rangers, Florida Panthers, Detroit Red Wings, and Philadelphia Flyers before retiring in 2024.

== Playing career ==
=== Junior ===
==== Peterborough Petes ====
Staal played major junior in the Ontario Hockey League (OHL) with the Peterborough Petes for two seasons, beginning in 2004–05 after having been selected third overall in the 2004 OHL Priority Draft. In his second year with the club, he produced at a point-per-game pace with 28 goals and 68 points in 68 games before adding 16 points in the playoffs to help lead Peterborough to the J. Ross Robertson Cup as OHL champions. Earning a berth in the 2006 Memorial Cup, the Petes did not, however, make it past the round-robin. During the 2005–06 season, Staal was also selected to play in the 2006 CHL Top Prospects Game.

Going into the 2006 NHL entry draft, Staal was ranked second among North American skaters by the NHL Central Scouting Bureau, behind Erik Johnson of the University of Minnesota Golden Gophers. He went on to be drafted second overall by the Pittsburgh Penguins, behind Johnson, who was selected by the St. Louis Blues. Jordan became the third among the four Staal brothers to be drafted into the NHL after his older brothers Marc and Eric, the latter of whom was also selected second overall.

=== Professional (2006–present) ===
==== Pittsburgh Penguins (2006–2012) ====
Staal was signed to a three-year, entry-level contract by the Penguins on October 2, 2006, and made the immediate jump from junior to the NHL in 2006–07 at the age of 18. He scored his first NHL goal on October 12, a shorthanded breakaway marker against New York Rangers goaltender Henrik Lundqvist in a 6–5 win. Later that month, on October 21, Staal set a pair of NHL records with a two-goal effort against the Columbus Blue Jackets. In addition to becoming the youngest player to record a two-goal game since Bep Guidolin of the Boston Bruins did so at the age of 18 years and 12 days on December 21, 1943, Staal also scored both his goals on the penalty kill, becoming the youngest player to record two shorthanded goals in one game (surpassing Radek Dvořák of the Florida Panthers, who did so at 20 years and 278 days on December 12, 1997). Having scored his second shorthanded marker on a penalty shot, Staal additionally became the youngest player to score on a penalty shot, surpassing Nathan Horton, who scored with Florida at 18 years and 224 days on January 8, 2004.

Early in Staal's rookie season, however, there was still speculation that he would be returned to his junior team before playing his 10th game to avoid allowing him to accrue a full season under the NHL's collective bargaining agreement. Due to his strong play, however, particularly on the penalty-kill, the Penguins chose to keep him for the remainder of the season. Staal, along with fellow rookie Evgeni Malkin joined superstar Sidney Crosby, who had himself only entered his second NHL season, and goaltender Marc-André Fleury to form an effective young nucleus that revived the Penguins franchise.

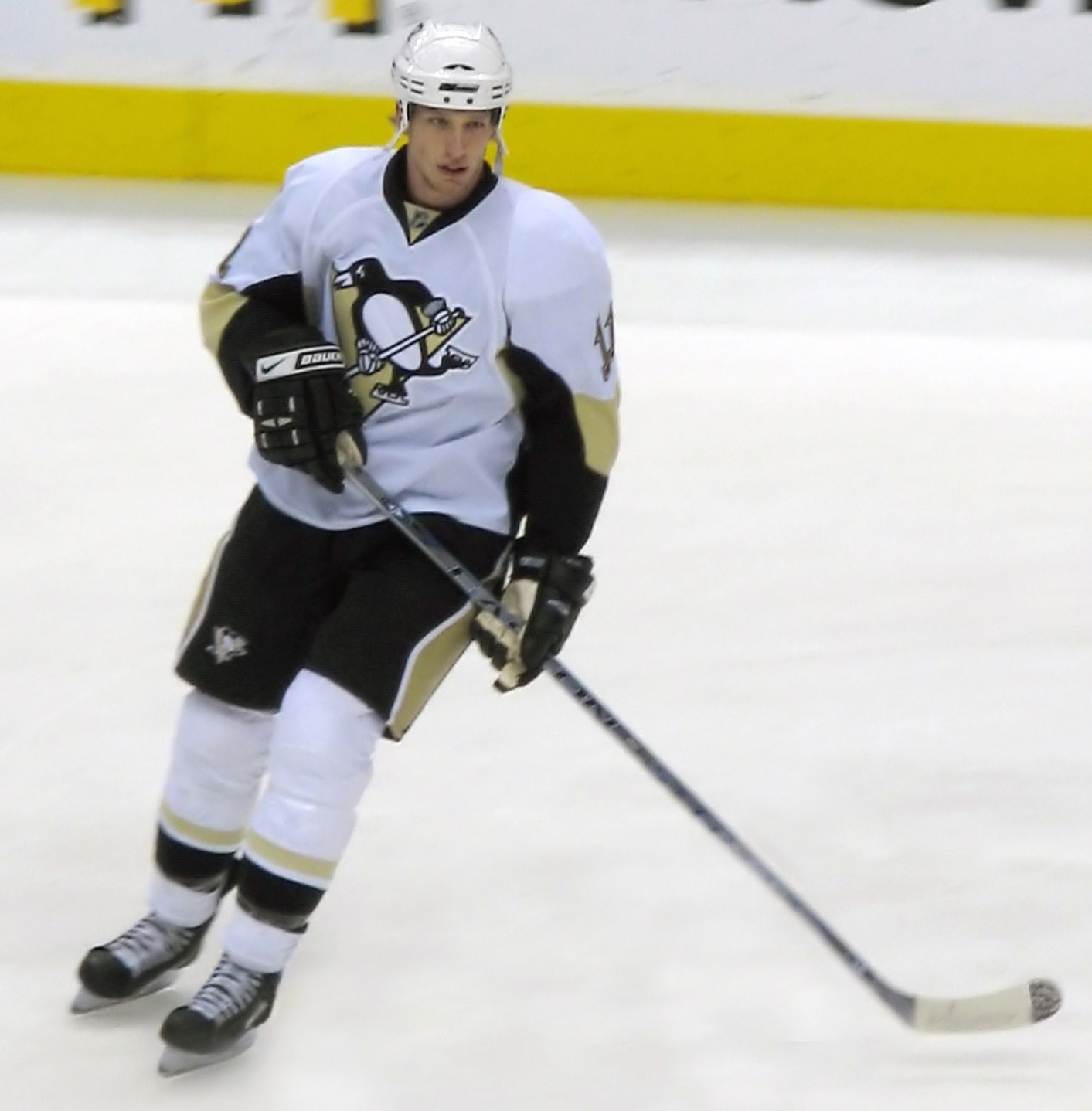
Staal with the Penguins, December 2007

In January 2007, Staal participated in the NHL YoungStars Game during the All-Star festivities, along with teammates Ryan Whitney and Malkin. Shortly thereafter, on February 10, 2007, Staal scored his first NHL career hat trick against the Toronto Maple Leafs and set yet another NHL record by becoming the youngest player in league history to score a hat trick at 18 years and 153 days. His first goal came at 19:22 in the first period, the second came at 3:32 in the second, and his third was the game winner, as he beat Toronto goalie Andrew Raycroft stick-side at 3:54 in overtime. The previous mark had been held for over sixty years by Jack Hamilton, who achieved a four-goal game at 18 years and 185 days old with the Maple Leafs against the New York Rangers on December 4, 1943. Then, late in the season, on March 6, Staal scored his league-leading seventh shorthanded goal of the season to break the previous league record for shorthanded tallies by a rookie (which was jointly held by Gerry Minor and John Madden). The goal cued a late third-period comeback for the Penguins to win 5–4 in a shootout against the Ottawa Senators.

Staal completed his rookie season with 29 goals, second in rookie goal-scoring to teammate Malkin, and 42 points for a Calder Memorial Trophy nomination. The award was given to Malkin, while Staal finished third in the voting, behind first runner-up Paul Stastny of the Colorado Avalanche. Staal also joined Malkin and Stastny on the NHL All-Rookie Team.

The next season, in 2007–08, however, Staal's production suffered a setback, managing just 12 goals and 28 points. Regardless, he was an integral part of the Penguins' 2008 playoff run to the Stanley Cup Final against the Detroit Red Wings. Playing in the semi-finals against the Philadelphia Flyers, Staal briefly left the Penguins to attend his grandfather's funeral during the series, but returned for a two-goal game-four effort, in which he cued a near-comeback in the third period to cut the Flyers lead to 3–2. The Penguins were eventually defeated 4–2 but managed to eliminate the Flyers the following game. In the Stanley Cup Final, the first for the franchise since 1992, they were defeated in six games by the Red Wings, with Staal contributing six goals and one assist during the playoff run.

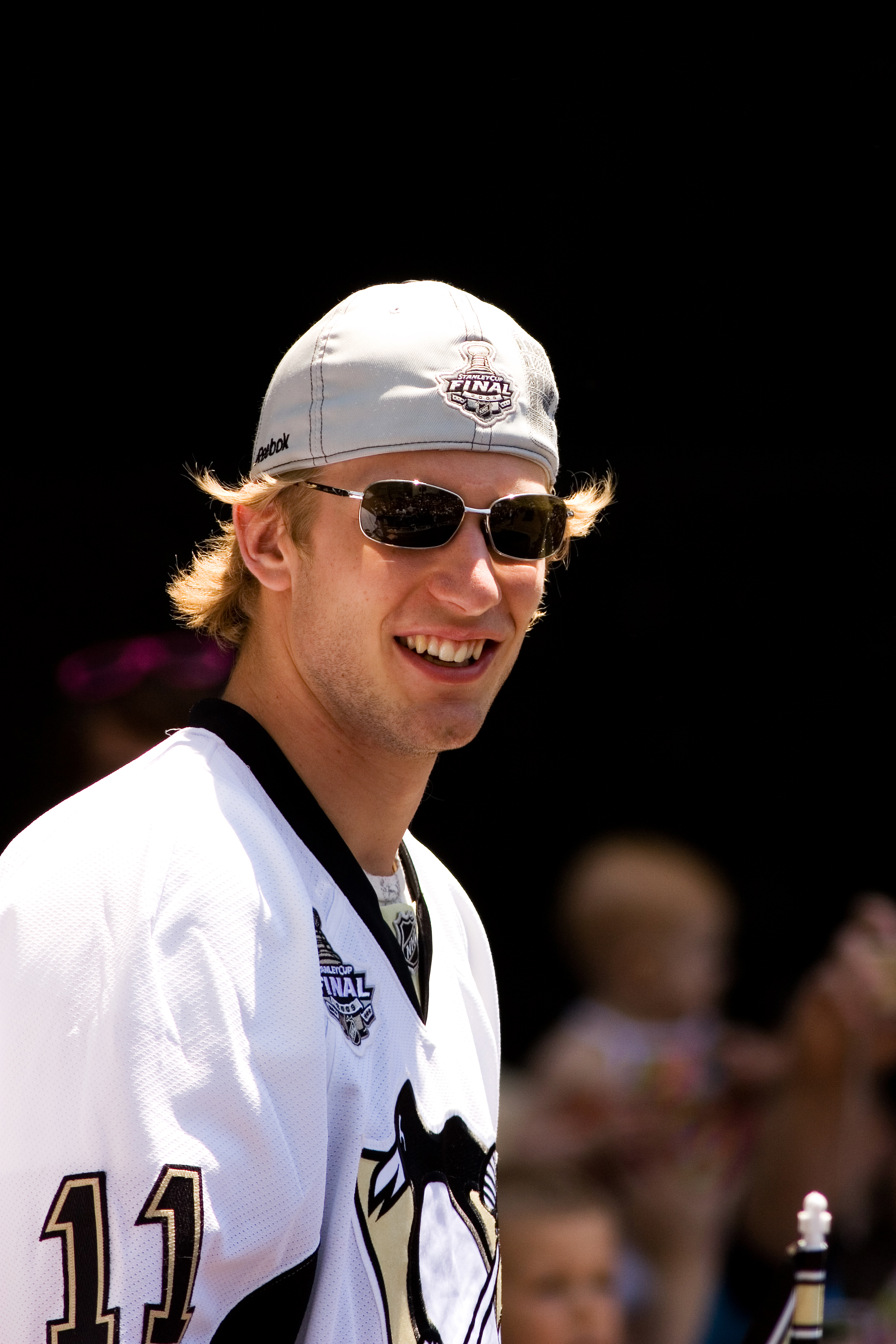
Staal during the Penguins' Stanley Cup parade in June 2009

Early in the 2008–09 season, the Penguins and Red Wings met for the first time since the Stanley Cup series on November 11, 2008. With the Penguins down by three goals in the third period, Staal notched his second career NHL hat trick to tie the game, then set up Ruslan Fedotenko's overtime winner to defeat the Red Wings 7–6. On December 2, 2008, he was named to the rotating position of alternate captain for the Penguins for the month of December. The following month, on January 8, 2009, the Penguins announced that they had extended Staal's contract through the 2012–13 season. Terms of the contract were for $16 million, payable as $3.5 million for the first two seasons, and then $4.5 million for the last two years, resulting in a $4 million salary cap hit. He completed the season bouncing back from the decreased production of his sophomore year with a career-high 27 assists and 49 points. On June 12, 2009, Staal and the Penguins won the Stanley Cup when they defeated the Detroit Red Wings 2–1 at the Joe Louis Arena. Staal had two goals and an assist in the seven-game series and scored a shorthanded goal that was a pivotal point in game four of the series.

At the end of the regular season, Staal was named as one of the three finalists for the Selke Trophy along with Pavel Datsyuk and Ryan Kesler, awarded annually to the best defensive forward in the league. On April 30, 2010, Staal injured his right leg after his foot was sliced by Montreal Canadiens defenceman P. K. Subban's skate. He had to undergo surgery to repair a torn tendon on top of his big toe. During this injury, Staal ended up missing game two of the Eastern Conference Semi-finals against the Canadiens, the first game Staal had missed in a Penguins uniform since his rookie season – a streak of 358 consecutive games played including the playoffs. Staal scored the last Penguins goal at Pittsburgh's Mellon Arena, in game seven of the second round against the Montreal Canadiens.

Staal missed the entire first month of October, still recovering from foot surgery. Then, on November 1, just two days before he was to make his season debut, he was struck by a puck in practice, fracturing his hand and sidelining him again for surgery. Staal finally made his season debut at the NHL Winter Classic on January 1, 2011.

On April 18, 2012, Staal registered his first playoff hat trick against the Philadelphia Flyers in a 10–3 victory at the Wells Fargo Center. He would finish the series with six goals as the Penguins lost to the Flyers in six games, their second consecutive first-round playoff exit.

==== Carolina Hurricanes (2012–present) ====
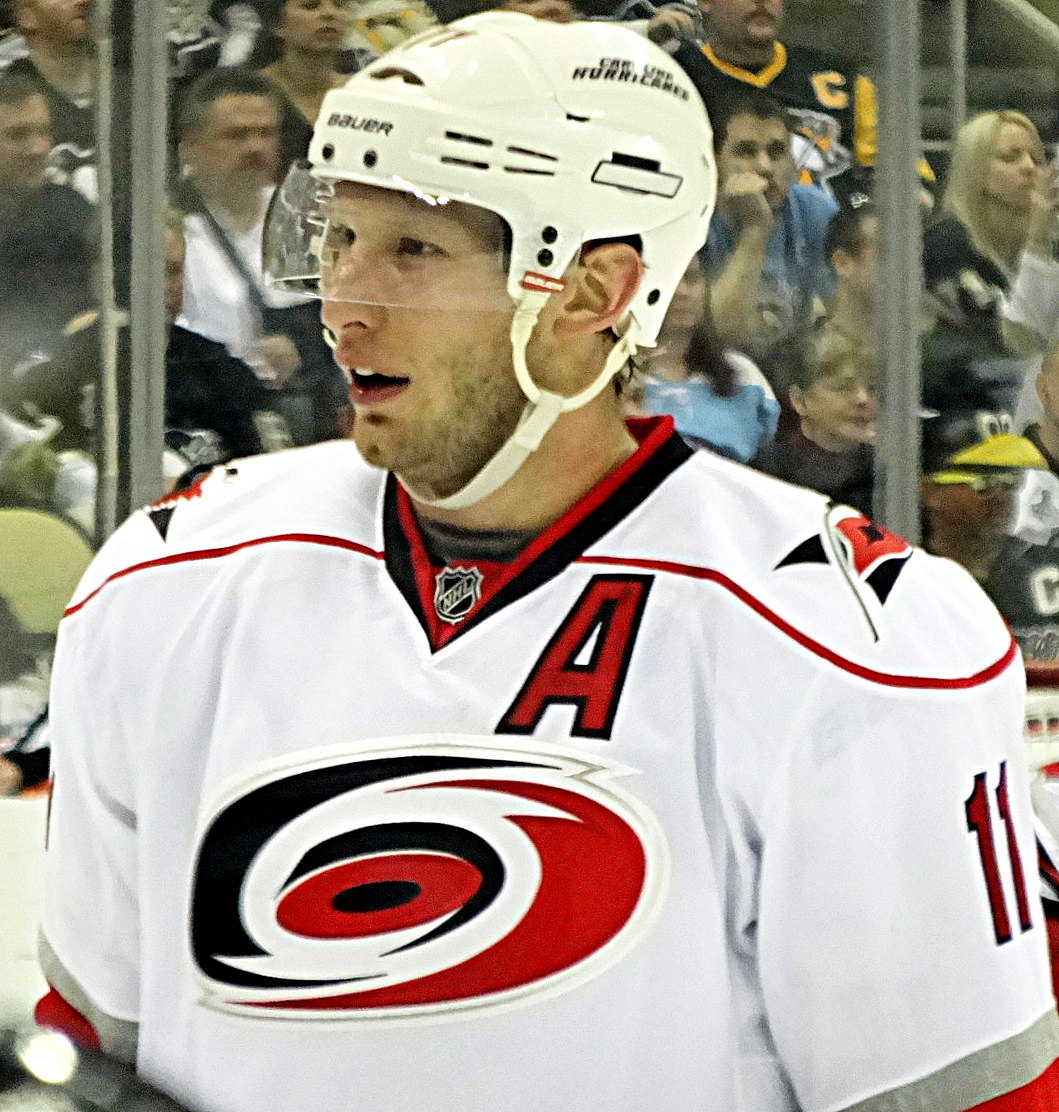
Staal with the Hurricanes, April 2013

On June 22, 2012, Staal, on his wedding day, was traded to the Carolina Hurricanes in exchange for Brandon Sutter, Brian Dumoulin and the Hurricanes' eighth overall pick at the 2012 NHL entry draft (which the Penguins used to select Derrick Pouliot), joining his brother Eric Staal. On July 1, 2012, Staal signed a ten-year, $60 million extension with the Hurricanes. He had received the same offer from the Pittsburgh Penguins but declined it.

On September 23, 2014, Staal broke his right leg in a pre-season game against the Buffalo Sabres.

In November 2016, Staal was diagnosed with a concussion. At the time of his injury, he had recorded five goals and nine points in 21 games.

Staal, along with Justin Faulk, was named co-captain of the Hurricanes, on October 5, 2017. At the conclusion of the 2017–18 season, Staal was named a finalist for the Bill Masterton Memorial Trophy, alongside New Jersey Devils forward Brian Boyle and Florida Panthers goaltender Roberto Luongo, ultimately going to Boyle.

In December 2018, Staal was diagnosed with a concussion and was placed on long-term injury reserve (LTIR). At the time of his injury, he had recorded five goals and six assists in 27 games. He was activated from LTIR on February 23, 2019. During that season, the Hurricanes qualified for the 2019 playoffs for the first time since 2009 but lost in the Eastern Conference Final.

On September 29, 2019, Staal was named captain of the Hurricanes, replacing Justin Williams.

On April 12, 2021, Staal played in his 1,000th NHL game.

On April 10, 2022, Staal scored three goals in a game against the Anaheim Ducks, registering his third regular-season hat trick in the NHL. At 13 years and 142 days since his last regular season hat trick against the Red Wings in 2008 (4,898 days), it is the longest time between two regular season hat tricks for any player in NHL history.

On June 25, 2023, Staal signed a four-year, $11.6 million extension with the Hurricanes.

Staal reached his third Stanley Cup final at the 2026 playoffs. On June 12, Staal tied the record for longest goal streak in a Stanley Cup Final series, opening the scoring for the Hurricanes in game five of the 2026 Stanley Cup Final. The previous players to score in the first five Stanley Cup Final games are Cyclone Taylor (in 1918), Maurice Richard (in 1951) and Jean Béliveau (in 1956); Yvan Cournoyer also scored in five consecutive Cup Final games in 1973, but not the first five games of the Final. When the Hurricanes won the title in game six, Staal was the leading scorer in the Final with six goals, being recognized with the Conn Smythe Trophy. At 37 years and 266 days, Staal surpassed Tim Thomas in 2011 (37 years, 61 days) as the oldest most valuable player recipient. While leading the Final in goals, Staal registered 12 points in the full playoff run: the fewest points by a forward to win the Conn Smythe since Dave Keon won the award in 1967 with 8 points. In addition to his scoring in the Final, Staal was noticed for winning faceoffs through the playoffs and especially in the Final where his win rate stood at 69%, setting a playoff record for faceoff win percentage.

== International play ==
Medal record

Men's ice hockey

Representing Canada

World Championships
Gold medal – first place	2007 Moscow	

Staal made his international debut with Canada at the 2007 World Championships. Named to the team following the Penguins' first-round playoff defeat, he joined brother Eric to help Canada capture the gold medal by defeating Finland 4–2 in the final. In nine games, Staal contributed two assists.

== Personal life ==
Born the third of four boys in Thunder Bay, Ontario, Staal grew up playing ice hockey with his three brothers on an outdoor rink built by their father, Henry. All of the Staal brothers have played in the NHL. Older brothers Eric, drafted by the Carolina Hurricanes in 2003, and Marc, drafted by the New York Rangers in 2005, both played with Jordan in the NHL, while younger brother Jared was drafted in 2008 by the Phoenix Coyotes, played 2 NHL games, and is currently head coach of the Savannah Ghost Pirates of the ECHL. His cousin Jeff Heerema was drafted by the Hurricanes in the first round of the 1998 NHL entry draft.

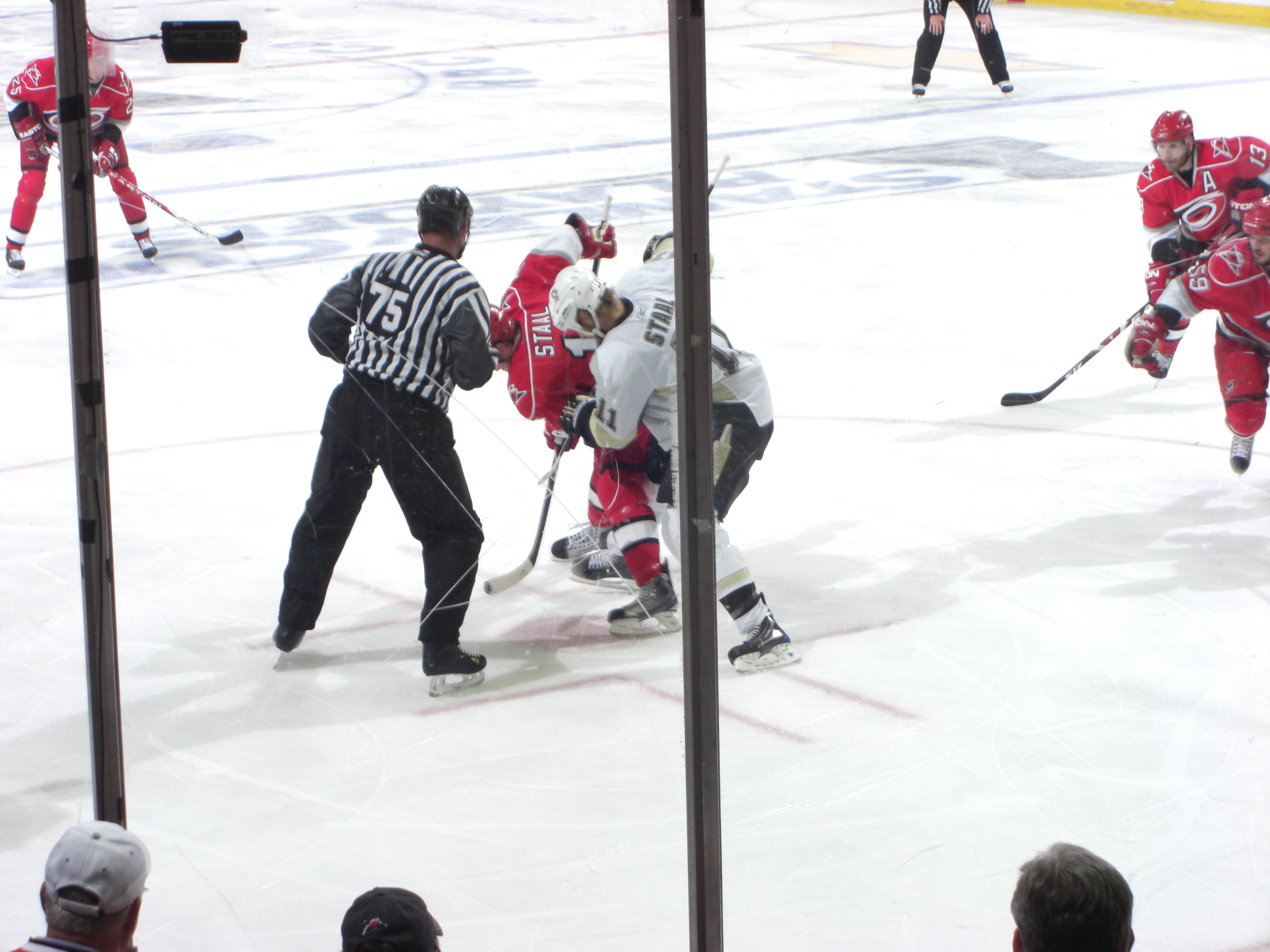
Jordan Staal (centre foreground) fights over control of the puck with older brother Eric Staal (centre background) during the 2009 Stanley Cup playoffs.

Before becoming teammates in Carolina, Jordan and Eric have played together on one occasion prior, as part of Team Canada's 2007 World Championship gold medal-winning team, while also competing against each other in the NHL, including their high-profile matchup in the 2009 Eastern Conference Final. He has also met Marc's New York Rangers in the 2008 playoffs. Jordan has eliminated his brothers with the Penguins in both instances. Jordan has become the second brother to win a Stanley Cup (Pittsburgh 2009) behind older brother Eric (Carolina 2006).

In the summer of 2007, Jordan was arrested at Eric's bachelor party. Both were charged with misdemeanor disorderly conduct and obstructing the legal process while spending the night in jail. Jordan was also cited with underage drinking.

On June 22, 2012, Staal married longtime girlfriend Heather Dysievick. The couple has three daughters and a son. Their youngest daughter was delivered stillborn on February 22, 2018, a tragedy that made him miss three games.

Staal is a Christian. Staal has said, "Hockey was my identity. Sure, it pushed me to be the player I was, but it still left me empty. I made the NHL and won that Stanley Cup with Pittsburgh, fulfilling all the dreams I could ever think of, but I remember waking up a week later and realizing, 'that's it?'... Hockey is an unbelievable sport and something that has obviously been a big part of my life, but it's not all me; it's not something I live for. I live for God, and hockey is definitely something that I want to give God the glory for."

In 2012, the Staal Brothers created the Staal Family Foundation, an organization that tries "to help improve the quality of life for children with cancer and their families."

== Career statistics ==
=== Regular season and playoffs ===
			Regular season					Playoffs
Season	Team	League	GP	G	A	Pts	PIM	GP	G	A	Pts	PIM
2004–05	Peterborough Petes	OHL	66	9	19	28	29	14	5	5	10	16
2005–06	Peterborough Petes	OHL	68	28	40	68	69	19	10	6	16	16
2006–07	Pittsburgh Penguins	NHL	81	29	13	42	24	5	3	0	3	2
2007–08	Pittsburgh Penguins	NHL	82	12	16	28	55	20	6	1	7	14
2008–09	Pittsburgh Penguins	NHL	82	22	27	49	37	24	4	5	9	8
2009–10	Pittsburgh Penguins	NHL	82	21	28	49	57	11	3	2	5	6
2010–11	Pittsburgh Penguins	NHL	42	11	19	30	24	7	1	2	3	2
2011–12	Pittsburgh Penguins	NHL	62	25	25	50	34	6	6	3	9	2
2012–13	Carolina Hurricanes	NHL	48	10	21	31	32	—	—	—	—	—
2013–14	Carolina Hurricanes	NHL	82	15	25	40	34	—	—	—	—	—
2014–15	Carolina Hurricanes	NHL	46	6	18	24	14	—	—	—	—	—
2015–16	Carolina Hurricanes	NHL	82	20	28	48	34	—	—	—	—	—
2016–17	Carolina Hurricanes	NHL	75	16	29	45	38	—	—	—	—	—
2017–18	Carolina Hurricanes	NHL	79	19	27	46	26	—	—	—	—	—
2018–19	Carolina Hurricanes	NHL	50	11	17	28	26	15	4	6	10	8
2019–20	Carolina Hurricanes	NHL	68	8	19	27	40	8	0	0	0	4
2020–21	Carolina Hurricanes	NHL	53	16	22	38	30	11	5	3	8	6
2021–22	Carolina Hurricanes	NHL	78	17	19	36	18	14	1	5	6	2
2022–23	Carolina Hurricanes	NHL	81	17	17	34	32	15	2	6	8	6
2023–24	Carolina Hurricanes	NHL	80	10	20	30	44	11	1	1	2	4
2024–25	Carolina Hurricanes	NHL	75	13	23	36	16	15	2	1	3	8
2025–26	Carolina Hurricanes	NHL	75	20	16	36	29	19	8	4	12	13
NHL totals			1,403	318	429	747	644	181	46	39	85	85

=== International ===
Year	Team	Event	Result	GP	G	A	Pts	PIM
2005	Canada Ontario	U17	4th	6	3	4	7	4
2005	Canada	U18	1st place, gold medalist(s)	5	1	1	2	12
2007	Canada	WC	1st place, gold medalist(s)	9	0	2	2	0
2013	Canada	WC	5th	8	1	2	3	4
Junior totals				11	4	5	9	16
Senior totals				17	1	4	5	4

== Awards ==
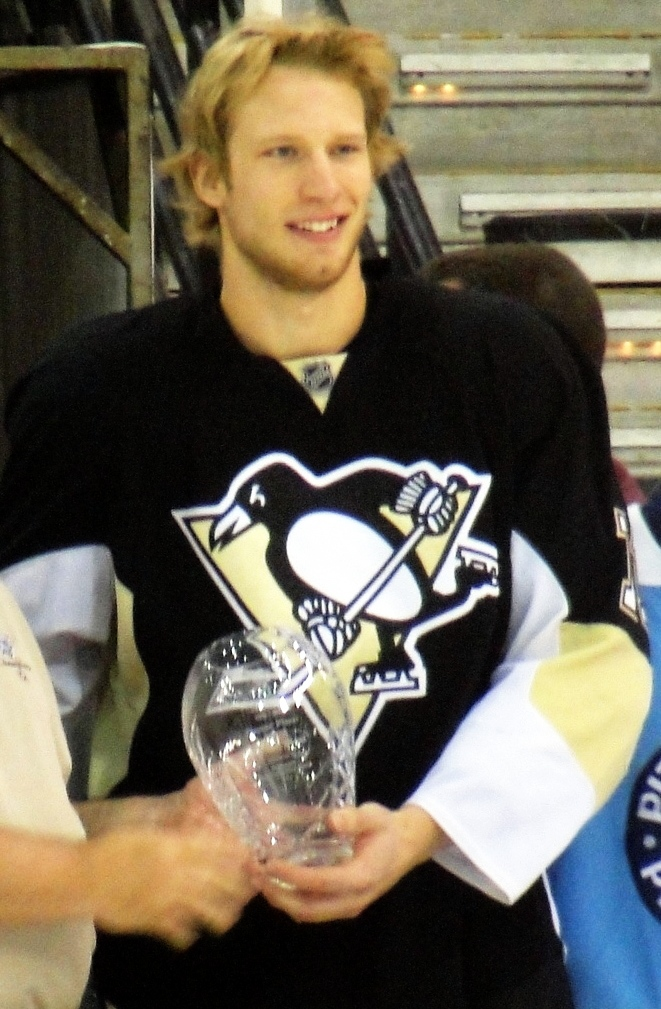
Staal receives the Player's Player Award, April 2010.

- OHL All-Star – 2006
- Played in CHL Top Prospects Game – 2006
- Shared Michel Brière Rookie of the Year Award with Evgeni Malkin – 2007
- Calder Memorial Trophy finalist – 2007
- NHL All-Rookie Team – 2007
- Players' Player Award – 2010
- Frank J. Selke Trophy finalist – 2010, 2024
- Stanley Cup champion – 2009, 2026
- Conn Smythe Trophy – 2026
- Steve Chiasson Award – 2015, 2018, 2021

== Records ==
=== NHL ===
- Youngest player to score two shorthanded goals in one game – October 21, 2006, against the Columbus Blue Jackets (18 years, 41 days; surpassed Radek Dvořák of the Florida Panthers; 20 years, 278 days on December 12, 1997)
- Youngest player to score on a penalty shot – October 21, 2006, against the Columbus Blue Jackets (18 years, 41 days; surpassed Nathan Horton of the Florida Panthers; 18 years, 224 days on January 8, 2004)
- Youngest player to score a hat trick – February 10, 2007, against the Toronto Maple Leafs (18 years, 153 days; surpassed Jack Hamilton of the Toronto Maple Leafs; 18 years, 185 days old on December 4, 1943)
- Most short-handed goals by a rookie, in 2006–07 (7 shorthanded goals; surpassed Gerry Minor of the Vancouver Canucks in 1980–81 and John Madden in 1999–2000; 6 shorthanded goals)
- Oldest player to win the Conn Smythe Trophy – June 14, 2026 (37 years, 277 days; surpassed Tim Thomas of the Boston Bruins in 2011; 37 years, 62 days on June 15, 2011)
- Longest span between Stanley Cup championships – June 14, 2026 (17 years, 2 days; surpassed Chris Chelios of the Montreal Canadiens in 1986 and the Detroit Red Wings in 2002; 16 years, 20 days)
- Longest goal streak in the Stanley Cup Final – June 11, 2026 (5 games; tied with Cyclone Taylor of the Vancouver Millionaires in 1918, Maurice Richard of the Montreal Canadiens in 1951, Jean Béliveau of the Montreal Canadiens in 1956, and Yvan Cournoyer of the Montreal Canadiens in 1973)

Awards and achievements
Preceded by Sidney Crosby	Pittsburgh Penguins first-round draft pick 2006	Succeeded by Angelo Esposito
Preceded by Sam Bennett	Conn Smythe Trophy; 2026	Succeeded by Incumbent
Sporting positions
Preceded by Eric Staal	Carolina Hurricanes captain 2017–18; With: Justin Faulk	Succeeded by Justin Williams
Preceded by Justin Williams	Carolina Hurricanes captain 2019–present	Incumbent
