= Jared Staal =

Canadian ice hockey player

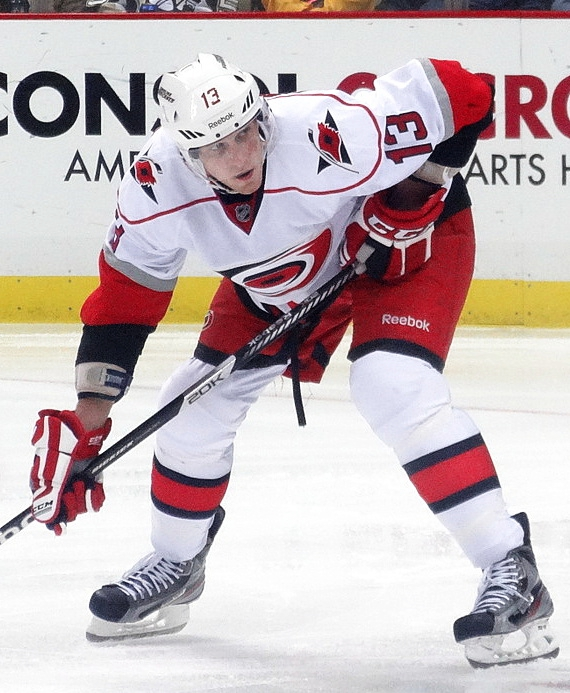
- Staal with the Carolina Hurricanes in 2013
- Born: August 21, 1990 (age 35) Thunder Bay, Ontario, Canada
- Height: 6 ft 4 in (193 cm)
- Weight: 210 lb (95 kg; 15 st 0 lb)
- Position: Right wing
- Shot: Right
- Played for: Carolina Hurricanes; Edinburgh Capitals
- NHL draft: 49th overall, 2008; Phoenix Coyotes
- Playing career: 2009–2017

Jared John Staal (born August 21, 1990) is a Canadian professional ice hockey coach and former player. He is the head coach for the Savannah Ghost Pirates of the ECHL. He formerly served as an assistant coach for the Charlotte Checkers of the American Hockey League (AHL).

Staal moved into coaching after retiring from playing in 2017, following a season with the Edinburgh Capitals of the Elite Ice Hockey League (EIHL). Staal was also a member of the Carolina Hurricanes of the National Hockey League (NHL). He is the fourth and youngest member of the Staal brothers, being the brother of former players Eric Staal and Marc Staal, as well as Jordan Staal of the Carolina Hurricanes. He is also the cousin of Jeff Heerema, formerly of the Nottingham Panthers.

== Playing career ==
Staal grew up in his hometown of Thunder Bay, Ontario playing 'AAA' hockey for the Thunder Bay Kings. He was drafted in the first round of the 2006 Ontario Hockey League (OHL) Priority Selection Draft by the Sudbury Wolves (11th overall).

Staal played the 2007–08 season with the Wolves. He was selected by the Phoenix Coyotes in the second-round of the 2008 NHL entry draft, 49th overall. He is the only member of the Staal brothers not to be taken in the first round of the NHL entry draft and the only one not to have been drafted by an Eastern Conference team. He is the only right-handed shooter of all four brothers.

On April 3, 2009, Staal signed an amateur tryout contract with the San Antonio Rampage, the AHL affiliate of the Coyotes. He appeared in five games for the Rampage in 2009, however he was sent back to the Sudbury Wolves for the remainder of the season.

On May 13, 2010, the Carolina Hurricanes acquired his rights from the Phoenix Coyotes in exchange for a fifth-round draft pick. On May 14, 2010, the Hurricanes signed Staal to a three-year entry-level contract. To start the 2010–11 season, he was assigned to the Hurricanes AHL affiliate, the Charlotte Checkers of the AHL. Struggling to gain ice time after 12 games, on November 19, 2010, Staal was reassigned to their ECHL affiliate, the Florida Everblades, but was later recalled. For the 2011–12 season, Staal returned to the Charlotte Checkers. On March 12, 2012, the Hurricanes loaned him to the Boston Bruins' affiliate Providence Bruins of the AHL for the remainder of the 2011–12 season.

After scoring three goals and four assists in 52 games with Charlotte in 2012–13, Staal made his NHL debut with the Hurricanes on April 25, 2013 against the New York Rangers. He was in the Hurricanes' starting line-up for the game, starting on a forward line with brothers Eric and Jordan.

After five seasons within the Hurricanes organization, Staal was released as a free agent in the summer. With limited NHL or AHL interest, Staal signed a one-year deal with the Florida Everblades of the ECHL on October 7, 2015. Prior to the 2015–16 season, he was traded by the Everblades to the South Carolina Stingrays on October 15, 2015.

On July 4, 2016, Staal signed abroad to a one-year contract with the Edinburgh Capitals of the EIHL.

== Coaching career ==
In June 2018, Staal retired from playing and signed a contract to become an assistant coach with OHA Edmonton of the Canadian Sport School Hockey League.

Staal was named the fifth assistant coach in Orlando Solar Bears history on August 8, 2019. He took on the title of associate coach for the 2021–22 ECHL season, remaining with the team until 2022 when Orlando head coach Drake Berehowsky left his position.

In August 2022, Staal was named an assistant coach for the AHL's Charlotte Checkers. Staal had spent five seasons as a player with the Checkers between 2010 and 2015.

In May 2024, Staal was named head coach of the ECHL's Savannah Ghost Pirates.

== Career statistics ==
			Regular season					Playoffs
Season	Team	League	GP	G	A	Pts	PIM	GP	G	A	Pts	PIM
2005–06	Thunder Bay Kings	U16 AAA	64	24	25	49	72	—	—	—	—	—
2006–07	Sudbury Wolves	OHL	63	2	1	3	18	21	1	0	1	2
2007–08	Sudbury Wolves	OHL	60	21	28	49	44	—	—	—	—	—
2008–09	Sudbury Wolves	OHL	67	19	33	52	38	6	0	1	1	2
2008–09	San Antonio Rampage	AHL	5	0	0	0	0	—	—	—	—	—
2009–10	Sudbury Wolves	OHL	59	12	37	49	125	3	0	0	0	4
2009–10	San Antonio Rampage	AHL	5	0	1	1	2	—	—	—	—	—
2010–11	Charlotte Checkers	AHL	13	1	1	2	2	—	—	—	—	—
2010–11	Florida Everblades	ECHL	33	6	5	11	6	—	—	—	—	—
2011–12	Charlotte Checkers	AHL	37	3	3	6	18	—	—	—	—	—
2011–12	Providence Bruins	AHL	7	0	2	2	2	—	—	—	—	—
2012–13	Charlotte Checkers	AHL	52	4	3	7	25	3	0	0	0	0
2012–13	Carolina Hurricanes	NHL	2	0	0	0	2	—	—	—	—	—
2013–14	Charlotte Checkers	AHL	50	2	5	7	23	—	—	—	—	—
2014–15	Charlotte Checkers	AHL	63	7	4	11	27	—	—	—	—	—
2015–16	South Carolina Stingrays	ECHL	64	12	12	24	23	6	1	0	1	2
2016–17	Edinburgh Capitals	EIHL	44	12	21	33	14	—	—	—	—	—
NHL totals			2	0	0	0	2	—	—	—	—	—

== Head coaching record ==
=== ECHL ===
Team	Year	Regular season						Playoffs			
Team	Year	G	W	L	OTL	Pts	Finish	W	L	Win%	Result
SAV	2024–25	72	31	34	6	69	5th in South	—	—	—	Missed playoffs
SAV	2025–26	72	35	33	3	74	4th in South	0	4	.000	Lost in first round (FLA)
Total		144	66	67	9			0	4	.000	1 playoff appearance

== See also ==
- Staal brothers
- List of family relations in the NHL
