= Staal brothers =

Family of Canadian ice hockey players

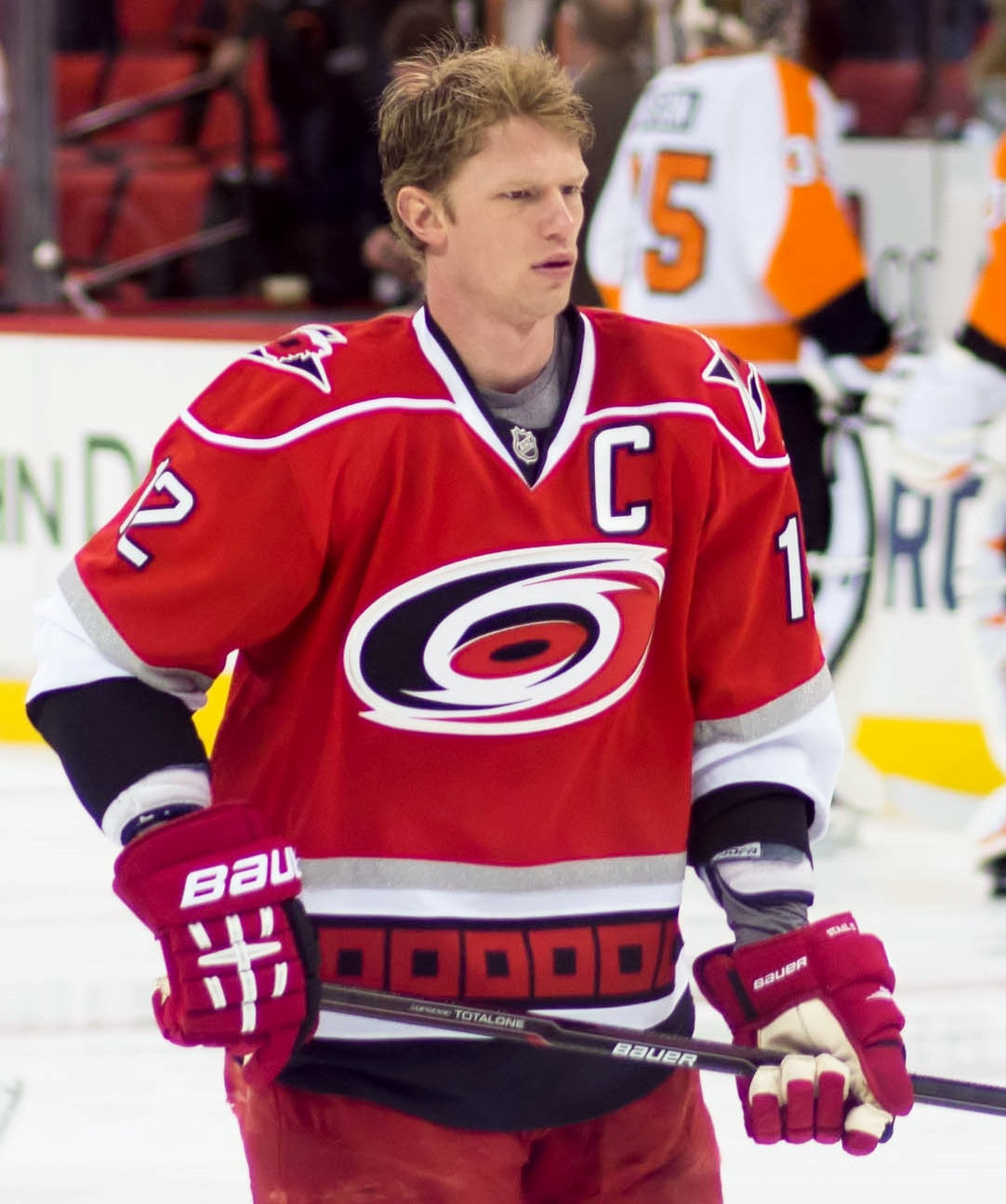
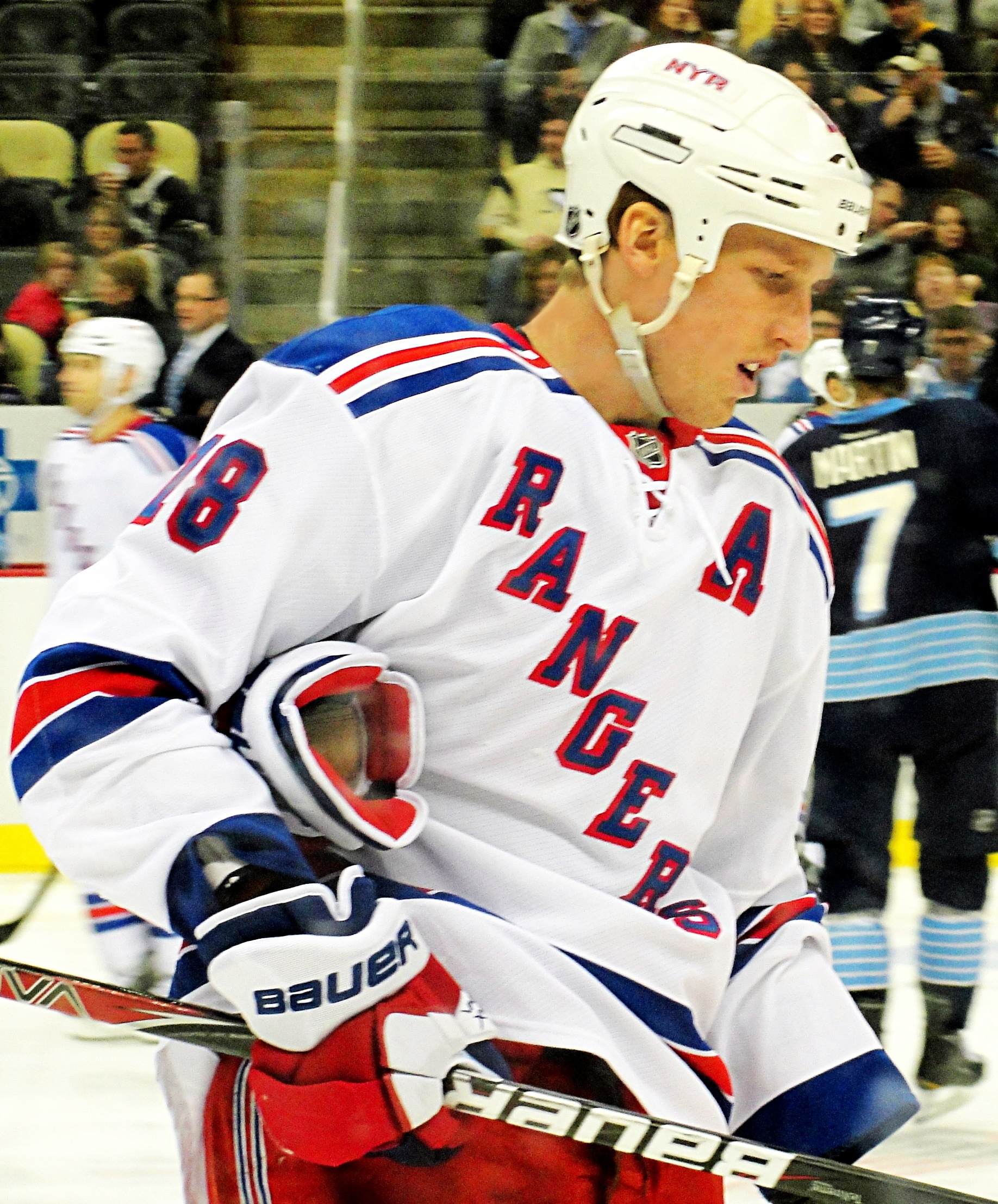
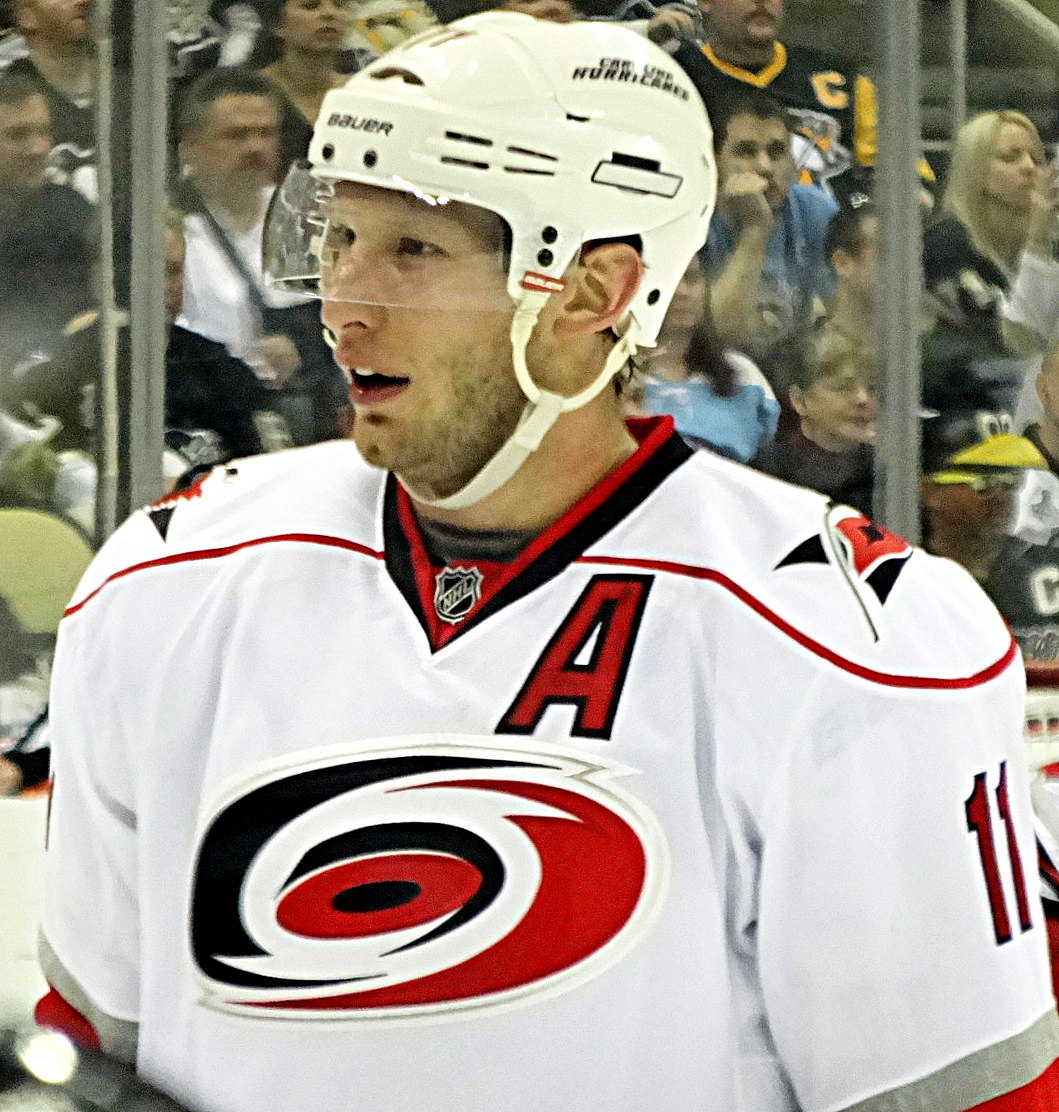
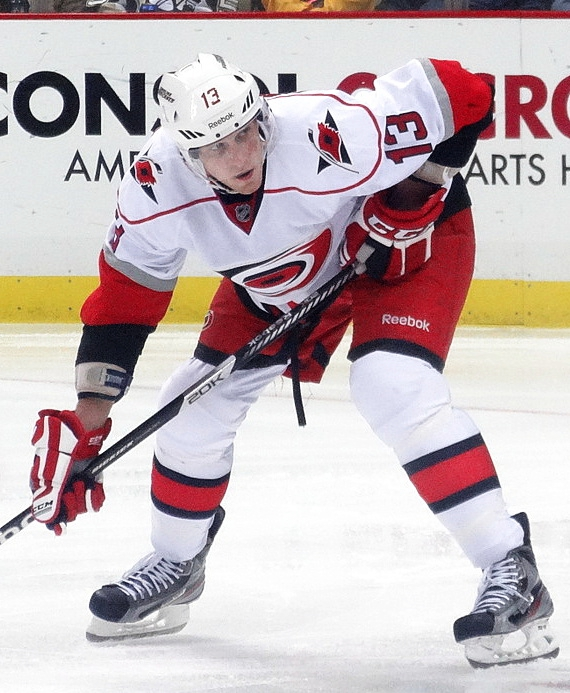
Eric Staal (above left), Marc Staal (above right), Jordan Staal (below left) and Jared Staal (below right)

The Staal brothers are four brothers—Eric, Marc, Jordan, and Jared—from Thunder Bay, Ontario, Canada, all of whom have had NHL contracts. Born to Dutch Canadian sod farmers Henry and Linda Staal, the brothers played AAA with their hometown Thunder Bay Kings; all but Marc played for the Carolina Hurricanes. Additionally, Eric, Jordan, and Marc are the first trio of brothers in NHL history to each record 1,000 games played. As of 2026, only Jordan still plays in the NHL.

== Eric ==
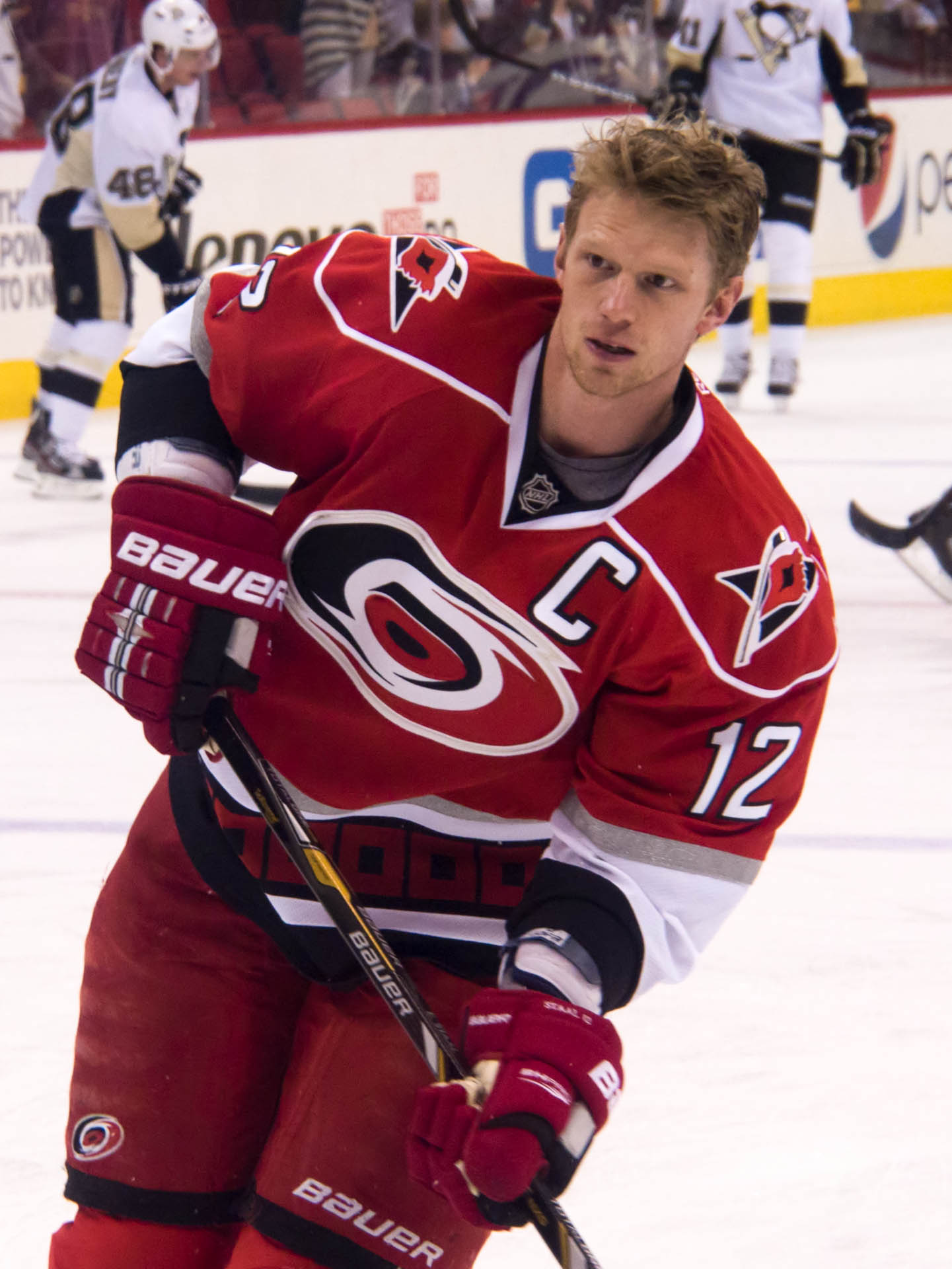
Eric Staal in warm-ups for the Hurricanes in 2013

Eric Staal (born October 29, 1984) is the oldest of the brothers. He played his major junior hockey for the Peterborough Petes of the OHL. Eric was selected second overall in the 2003 NHL entry draft by the Carolina Hurricanes. He played his first season after being drafted and was a part of the YoungStars game at the 2004 NHL All-Star Game. On June 19, 2006, Eric lifted the Stanley Cup with his teammates as they defeated the Edmonton Oilers in game 7 of the 2006 Stanley Cup Final. Eric was named captain of the Hurricanes on January 20, 2010. He became the fifth captain of the Hurricanes since their move to North Carolina from Hartford. Eric competed for Team Canada at the 2010 Winter Olympics, winning an Olympic gold medal. For the 2011 NHL All-Star Game, hosted in Raleigh, Eric was chosen as one of the captains. On February 28, 2016, just before the trade deadline, Eric was traded to the New York Rangers where he joined his brother Marc. After an unsuccessful stint with the Rangers, Staal concluded his contract and as a free agent signed a three-year contract with the Minnesota Wild on July 1, 2016. In 2020, he was traded to the Buffalo Sabres. In 2021, he was traded to the Montreal Canadiens. In 2022, he was the captain of Team Canada in the 2022 Winter Olympics in Beijing. He last played in 2023 for the Florida Panthers, before retiring in 2024 after signing a one-day contract with Carolina. The Hurricanes retired his #12 jersey on January 12, 2025.

== Marc ==
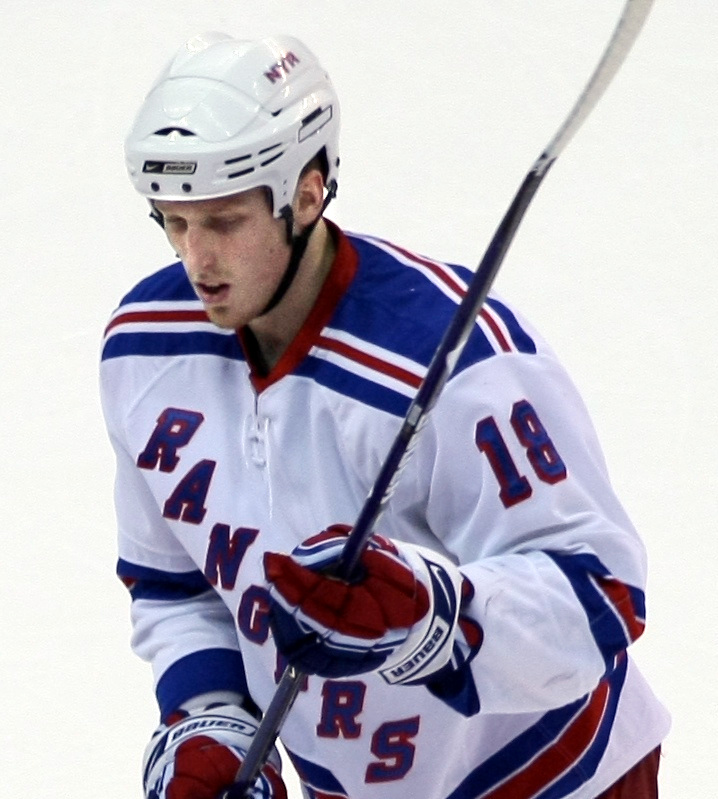
Marc Staal during a game in the 2009 Stanley Cup playoffs

Marc Staal (born January 13, 1987) is the second-oldest and the only brother to play as a defenseman. He is also the only one to never play for the Hurricanes. Marc played his major junior hockey with the Sudbury Wolves of the OHL from 2003 to 2007. He was the team captain and lead the Wolves to their first OHL final in 30 years. He was drafted 12th overall by the New York Rangers in the 2005 NHL entry draft but did not start playing in the NHL until 2007. Like Eric, Marc was a part of the YoungStars game at the All-Star Game in his rookie season. In 2010, after signing a 5-year extension with the Rangers, as well as a strong training camp, Marc was named an alternate captain of the team. Marc played on his brother Eric's team at the 2011 NHL All Star Game. On February 22, 2011, Marc was checked by his brother Eric and was slow to get up. He played the remainder of the season but it was revealed before the Rangers 2011 training camp that Marc was suffering from post-concussion symptoms. He did not return until January 2, 2012, to play in the 2012 NHL Winter Classic against the Philadelphia Flyers. Marc again lost most of a season due to injury in the lockout shortened 2012–13 season, as in March he got hit by a puck in the eye playing against the Flyers. Marc returned as a regular with the Rangers in 2013–14, and helped the team get to the 2014 Stanley Cup Final against the Los Angeles Kings, losing in 5 games. On September 26, 2020, he was traded to the Detroit Red Wings. He played in 2022–23 for the Florida Panthers and the following season with the Flyers. He retired on September 5, 2024 and plans to join the Rangers organization as a player development assistant.

== Jordan ==
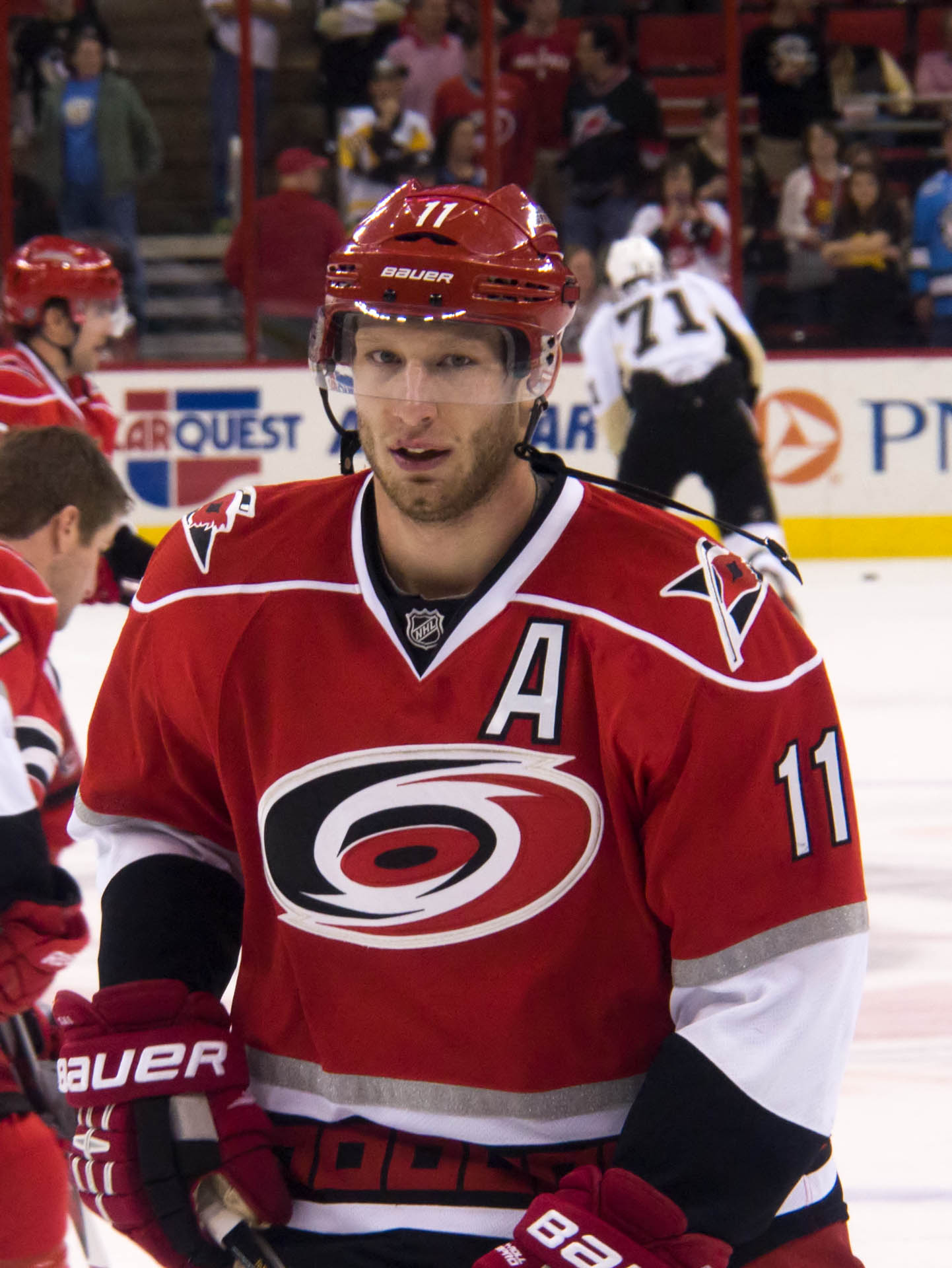
Jordan Staal with the Hurricanes in 2013

Jordan Staal (born September 10, 1988) is the third-oldest of the brothers. He played major junior for the same club as his brother Eric, the Peterborough Petes. With an almost point per game pace, Jordan helped lead the Petes to the J. Ross Robertson Cup as OHL champions in 2006. He was drafted second overall by the Pittsburgh Penguins in the 2006 NHL entry draft. He made his NHL debut in October 2006, a year before his older brother Marc. Jordan played in the YoungStars game at the 2007 NHL All-Star Game. He was nominated for the Calder Memorial Trophy, given to the Rookie of the Year by the NHL, but was beat out by teammate Evgeni Malkin. In 2008, the Penguins made the 2008 Stanley Cup Final but were defeated in six games by the Detroit Red Wings. He served as an alternate captain of the Penguins in December 2008, later he was named a full-time alternate captain at the start of the 2010–11 season. On June 12, 2009, Jordan became the second of the Staal brothers to hoist the Stanley Cup after defeating the reigning champion Red Wings in seven games. Due to a series of injuries, Jordan did not make his 2010–11 season debut until January 1, 2011 at the 2011 NHL Winter Classic. At the NHL entry draft in 2012, Jordan was traded to the Carolina Hurricanes, to be re-united with older brother Eric Staal. He then signed a 10-year, $60 million contract with Carolina. As of 2025–26, Jordan is the captain for the Carolina Hurricanes. Following the retirements of both Eric and Marc after the 2023–24 season, Jordan is the last remaining Staal brother to play in the NHL. Jordan won the Stanley Cup along with the Conn Smythe Trophy on June 14th 2026 while playing with the Carolina Hurricanes.

== Jared ==
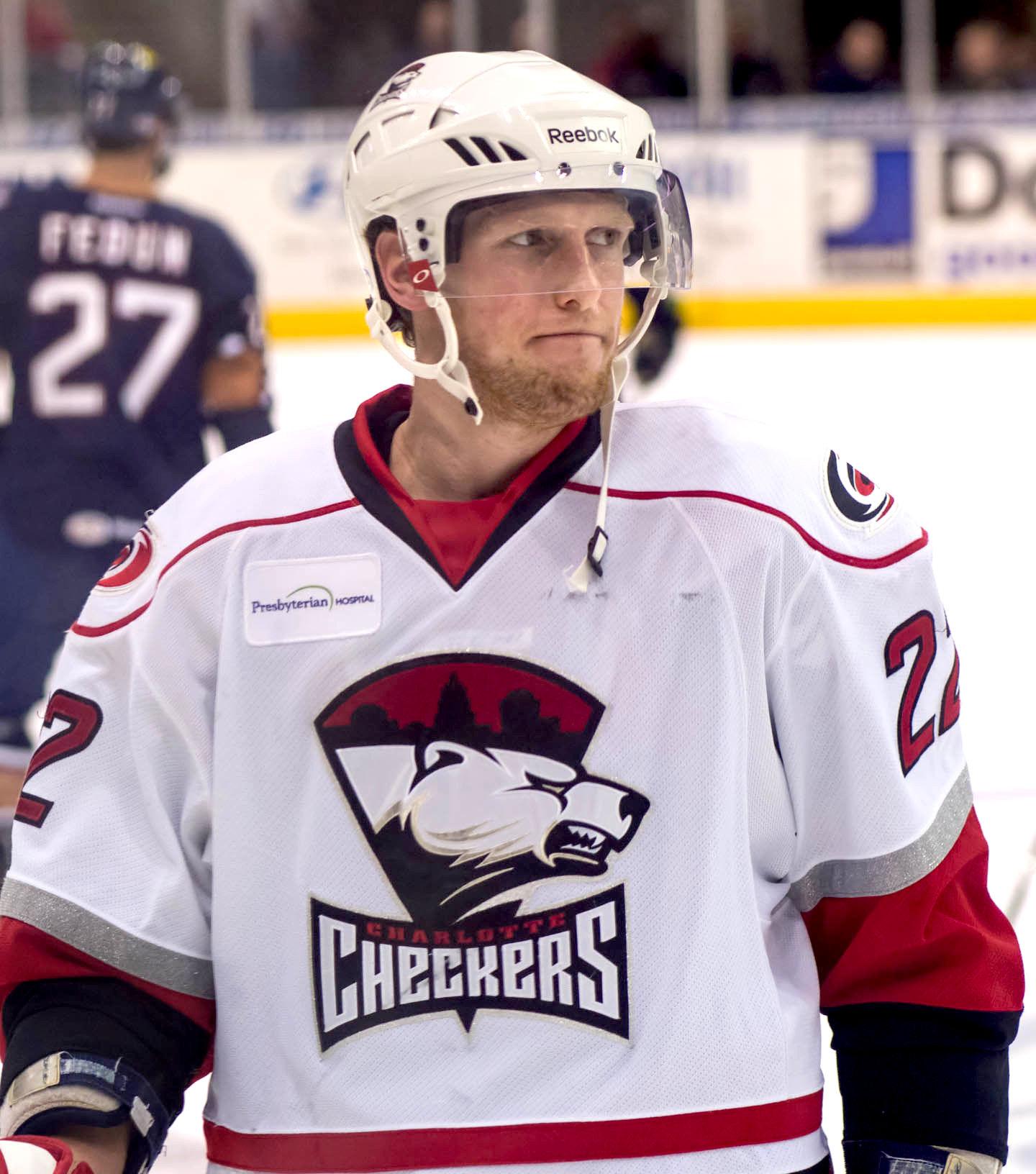
Jared Staal with the Checkers in 2013

Jared Staal (born August 21, 1990) is the youngest brother, the only brother to shoot right-handed, and the only brother to register zero points in the NHL. He played major junior for the Sudbury Wolves and played with his brother Marc during the 2006–07 season. Jared was taken 49th overall by the Phoenix Coyotes in the 2008 NHL entry draft, the only brother to be drafted by a Western Conference team. In 2009, Jared signed an amateur tryout contract with the Coyotes' AHL affiliate, the San Antonio Rampage. He appeared for five games with the Rampage before being sent back to the Sudbury Wolves. On May 13, 2010, the Carolina Hurricanes, the team his brothers Eric and Jordan played for, acquired his rights from the Coyotes for a 5th round draft pick. The next day, the Hurricanes signed Jared to a three-year entry-level contract. Jared began the 2010–11 season with the Hurricanes' AHL affiliate, the Charlotte Checkers. However, after 12 games, he was sent to the ECHL to play for the Florida Everblades but was later recalled. He returned to the Checkers for the 2011–12 season but was loaned to the Providence Bruins, the AHL affiliate of the Boston Bruins. On April 24, 2013, the Hurricanes recalled Jared for his only two NHL games where he played alongside brothers Eric and Jordan. He played the 2017–18 season in the EIHL for the Edinburgh Capitals.

He has since coached in the ECHL and AHL as an associate and assistant for the Checkers and the Orlando Solar Bears. On May 28, 2024, Jared was named head coach of the Savannah Ghost Pirates.

== Philanthropy ==
In 2012, the Staal Brothers created the Staal Family Foundation, an organization that tries “to help improve the quality of life for children with cancer and their families.”

== NHL careers statistics ==
		Regular season					Playoffs
Player	Years	GP	G	A	Pts	PIM	GP	G	A	Pts	PIM
Eric Staal	2003–23	1,365	455	608	1,063	854	104	25	39	64	38
Marc Staal	2007–24	1,136	53	181	234	537	128	7	13	20	52
Jordan Staal	2006–	1,328	298	413	711	615	181	46	39	85	85
Jared Staal	2013	2	0	0	0	2	—	—	—	—	—
Combined	2003–	3,831	806	1,202	2,008	2,008	413	78	94	169	175

== See also ==
- List of family relations in the National Hockey League
