= Marc Staal =

Canadian ice hockey player (born 1987)

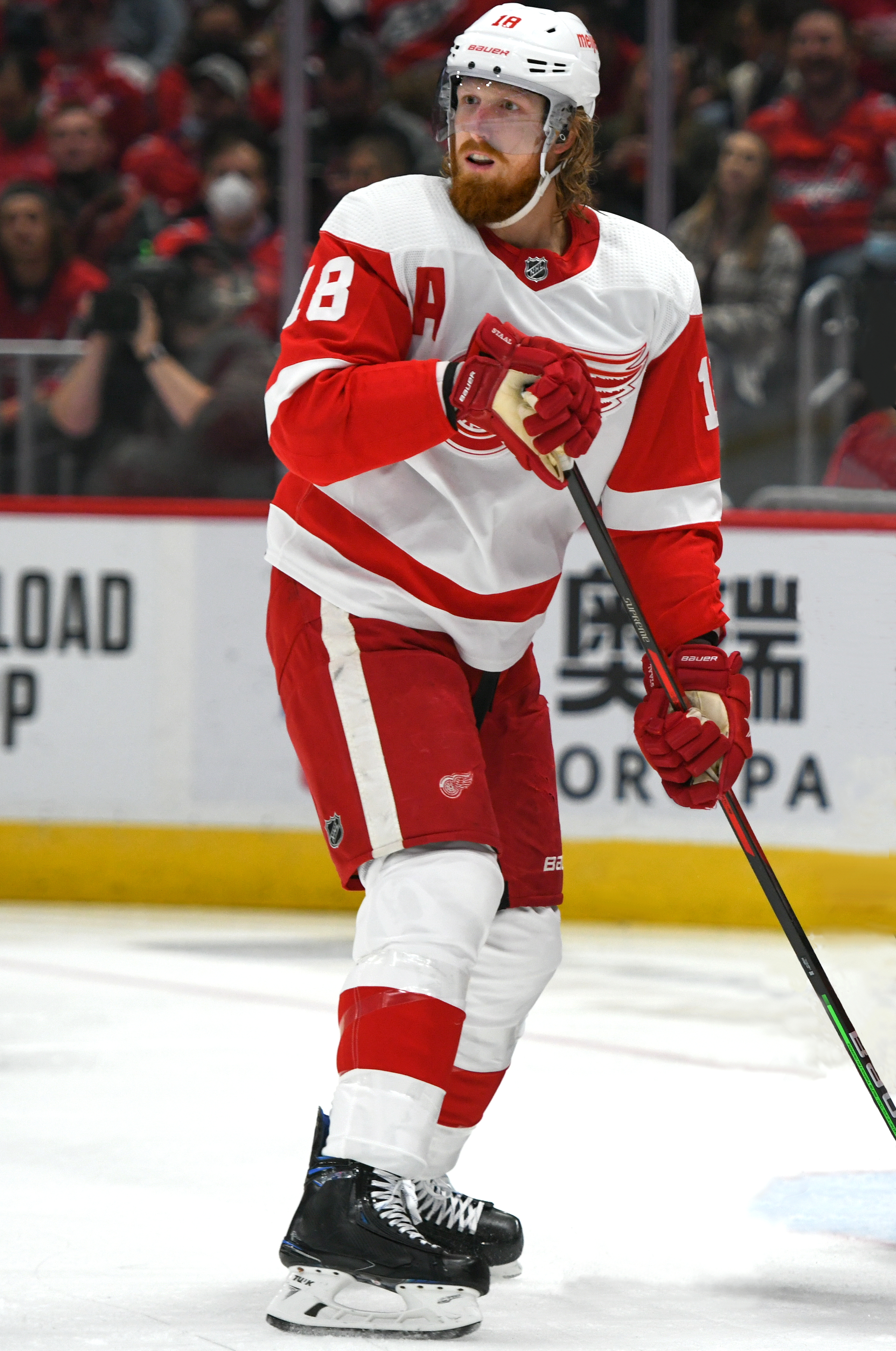
- Staal with the Detroit Red Wings in 2021
- Born: January 13, 1987 (age 39) Thunder Bay, Ontario, Canada
- Height: 6 ft 4 in (193 cm)
- Weight: 214 lb (97 kg; 15 st 4 lb)
- Position: Defence
- Shot: Left
- Played for: New York Rangers; Detroit Red Wings; Florida Panthers; Philadelphia Flyers
- National team: Canada
- NHL draft: 12th overall, 2005; New York Rangers
- Playing career: 2006–2024

Marc Staal (born January 13, 1987) is a Canadian professional ice hockey coach and former defenceman who is a player development assistant for the New York Rangers of the National Hockey League (NHL). Staal played 17 seasons in the NHL for the New York Rangers, Detroit Red Wings, Florida Panthers, and Philadelphia Flyers, amassing over 1,100 games played. He is the second oldest of the four Staal brothers to play in the NHL, and the third to reach 1,000 games played, making them the first trio of brothers to each reach the mark. Of the brothers, Marc is the only defenceman and only one who never played for the Carolina Hurricanes.

== Playing career ==
=== Junior ===
Staal grew up playing minor hockey in his hometown of Thunder Bay, Ontario, and was a minor hockey teammate of future NHLers Tom Pyatt, Ryan Parent and Taylor Chorney with the Thunder Bay Kings AAA program.

Staal was selected second overall in the 2003 Ontario Hockey League (OHL) Priority Selection by the Sudbury Wolves after a solid season with the Minor Midget Kings.

Staal played junior hockey from 2003 to 2007 for the Sudbury Wolves in the OHL, where he was the team's captain, and led the Wolves to their first trip to the OHL finals in 30 years. He was drafted by the New York Rangers in 2005 NHL entry draft in the first round, 12th pick overall. While most NHL scouts had projected Staal to be a top-ten selection, he fell in the draft and the Rangers, seeing Staal available even after the 11th pick was made, made a draft day trade to move up; in exchange for the Atlanta Thrashers' 12th overall selection, which they obtained from the San Jose Sharks, the Rangers dealt the Thrashers both its 16th and 41st picks.

Staal played for Team Canada in the 2006 and 2007 IIHF World Junior Ice Hockey Championships, bringing home gold medals both times. He was named the tournament's top defenceman in the 2006 Championships.

Marc and younger brother Jared played together in Sudbury during 2006–07 season.

On May 7, 2007, the OHL announced that Staal was the recipient of the Max Kaminsky Trophy as the OHL's Most Outstanding Defenceman for the 2006–07 season. This prestigious award was previously won by future NHL players Chris Pronger, Al MacInnis and Denis Potvin. On May 13, 2007, although his Sudbury team lost the OHL Championship Series to the Plymouth Whalers in six games, Staal was named the winner of the Wayne Gretzky 99 Award, which goes to the League's post-season most valuable player (MVP). The Sudbury Wolves retired Staal's jersey (#14) on February 3, 2023.

=== Professional ===
==== New York Rangers ====
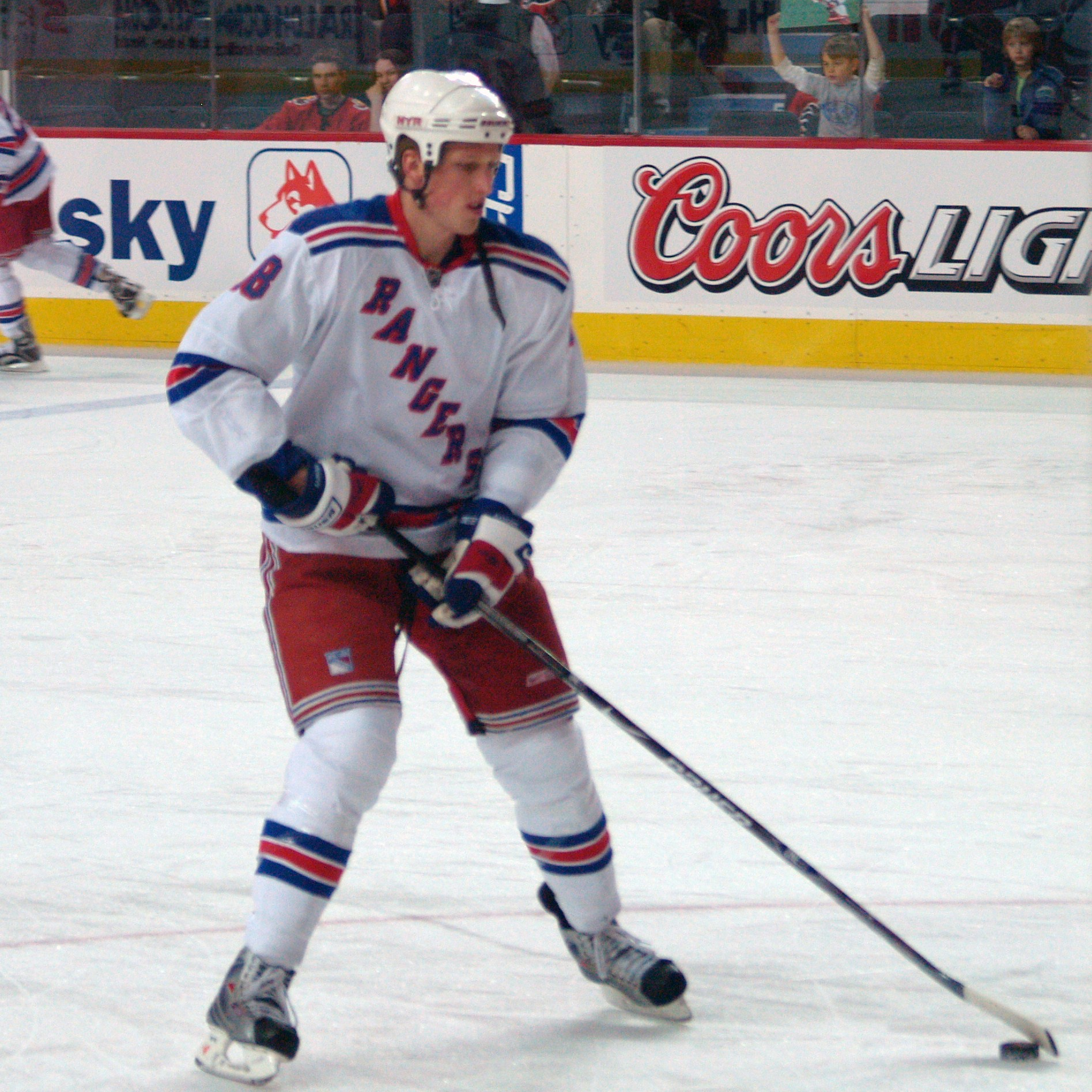
Staal with the Rangers during his rookie season in the NHL, January 2008

On October 4, 2007, Staal made his National Hockey League debut for the New York Rangers, as well as for head coach Tom Renney, who would use him in that first season primarily in a defensive role. Staal would record his first NHL point against the Washington Capitals on November 1, 2007, when Chris Drury deflected his shot in for a goal, earning Staal an assist. Staal scored his first NHL goal on November 14, 2007, against the New Jersey Devils at the Prudential Center. His wrist shot from the left faceoff circle sailed over the outstretched glove of goaltender Martin Brodeur and deflected in off the crossbar. Assisting on his first goal in the NHL were teammates Scott Gomez and Brendan Shanahan. During 2007–08, Staal was one of 16 rookies selected to participate in the YoungStars competition at the 2008 NHL All-Star Game in Atlanta, where he scored a goal and added an assist. Staal finished his rookie season with ten points on the strength of two goals and eight assists; he also established himself as a reliable defender, posting a positive plus/minus rating at +2, as the Rangers qualified for the Stanley Cup playoffs. He saved his best for the playoffs, with his first NHL playoff goal and two assists to help the Rangers defeat the Devils in five games during the Eastern Conference Quarter-finals. The goal was important — in the pivotal Game 4, Staal's slapper broke a 3–3 deadlock late in the third period and stood to be the game-winning goal in a 5–3 victory that gave the Rangers a 3–1 lead in the series. Like his first regular-season goal, it also came against Martin Brodeur. However, despite their win over the Devils in the Conference Quarterfinals, the Rangers would fall to his younger brother Jordan's team, the eventual Stanley Cup runner-up Pittsburgh Penguins, in the Eastern Conference Semi-finals.

In 2008–09, Staal improved his offensive output to 15 points, scoring three goals and adding 12 assists, all career highs at the time. He returned to the YoungStars Competition as a sophomore at the 2009 NHL All-Star Game in Montreal, and scored two goals. Late in the season, a coaching change led to a more offensive philosophy designed to propel the Rangers into the playoffs. The defensive-minded Tom Renney was replaced by John Tortorella, who encouraged more offence from all of his players, including Staal. As a result, much of Staal's production came toward the end of the season; 6 of his 15 points came after the coaching change, in just 21 games (as opposed to nine in 61 under Renney). The Rangers would again qualify for the Stanley Cup playoffs on the strength of their strong finish, but this time were defeated in the first round by the Washington Capitals in seven games after blowing a 3–1 series lead. During the series, Staal would record his second career NHL playoff goal.

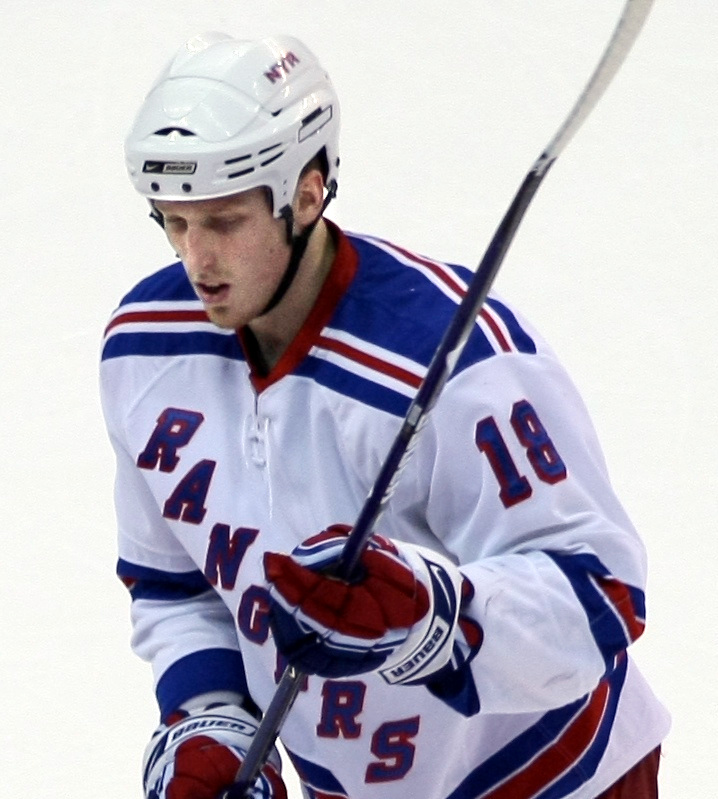
Staal during a game in the 2009 Stanley Cup playoffs

In the summer of 2009, Marc and his brothers Eric and Jordan were invited to try out for a Team Canada roster spot for the 2010 Winter Olympics in Vancouver. However, when the team was named on December 30, 2009, Eric was the only Staal named to the squad.

In his third NHL season, Staal began to transition into more of a two-way role for the Rangers during 2009–10 as the development of his offence continued under John Tortorella. Staal enjoyed the first four-game point streak of his career (one goal and three assists). Though the Rangers would miss the playoffs for the first time in Staal's career, he would establish new career highs with eight goals, 19 assists, 27 points and a career-best +11 rating during the season. He saved his finest for late in the year, scoring a beautiful, coast-to-coast goal against Florida Panthers goaltender Scott Clemmensen on April 3, 2010, after receiving the puck from teammate Henrik Lundqvist in the defensive zone. For Staal, it capped a three-game goal-scoring streak and ignited a Rangers comeback in an eventual 4–1 victory that kept the Rangers' playoff hopes alive. The team missed the playoffs on the final day of the season, however, losing 2–1 in a shootout to the Philadelphia Flyers, who took the eighth and final playoff spot from the Rangers. Staal led all Ranger skaters in ice time during the final game, on-ice for 29:16 of the game's 65 minutes and finished at +1.

In 2010, Marc became a restricted free agent for the first time. Though negotiations between Staal's camp and Rangers General Manager Glen Sather were often slow, Staal signed a five-year, $19.875 million extension with the team on September 15, 2010. After a strong training camp, John Tortorella recognized Staal's leadership qualities in October 2010 by naming him an alternate captain at the age of 23.

During the 2010–11 season, Staal was chosen for the first time to participate in the 2011 NHL All-Star Game held in Raleigh, North Carolina. During the game, he enjoyed a rare opportunity to play on the same team as his brother Eric. Staal tied Kimmo Timonen of the Philadelphia Flyers for most shorthanded goals among defencemen, with two.

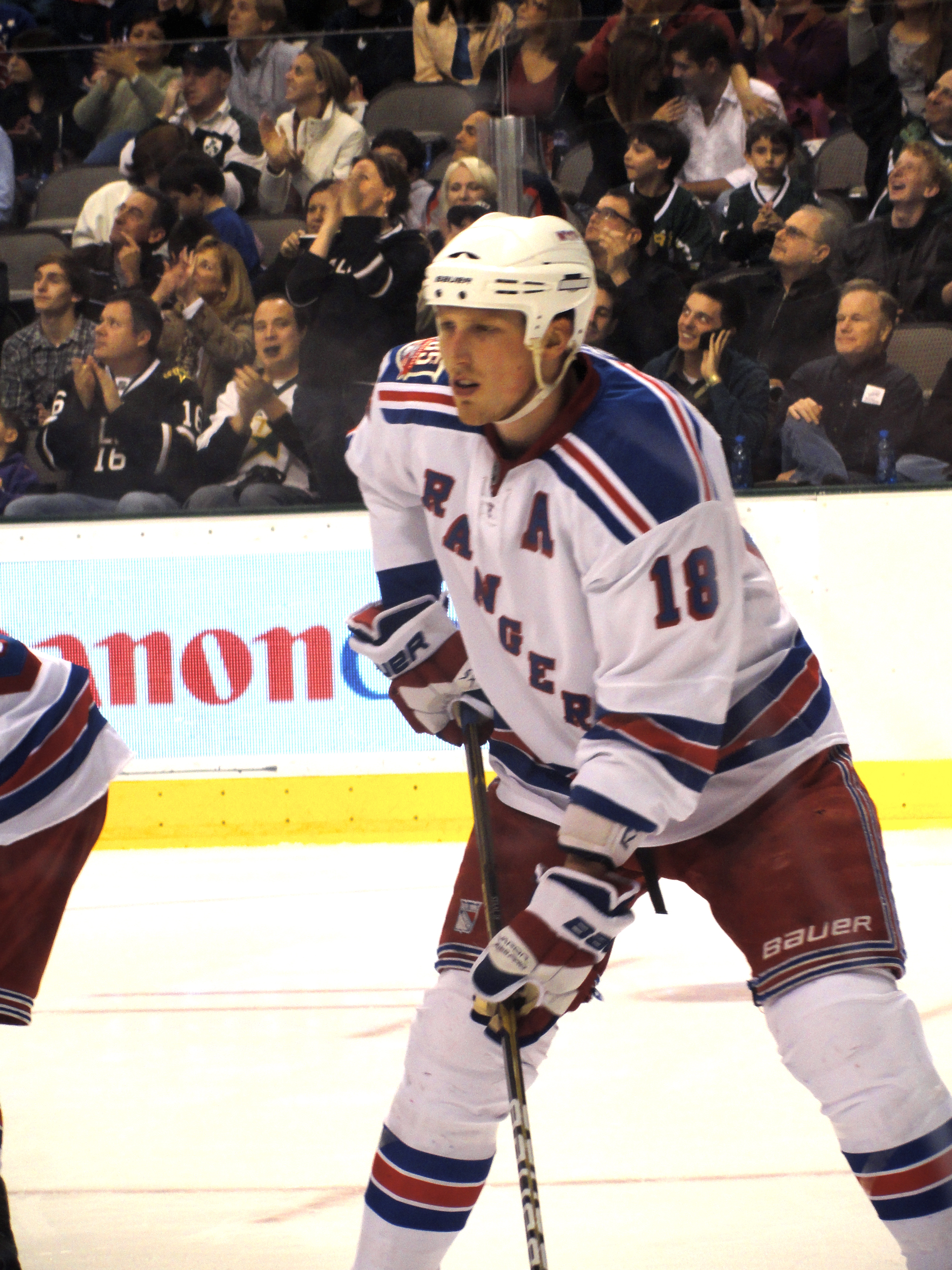
Staal with the Rangers in January 2011, his fourth season in the NHL

On February 22, 2011, in a game against the Carolina Hurricanes, Staal was checked by his brother, Eric. Marc was looking down, fighting for the puck with another Hurricanes player, when Eric came and threw a hard shoulder check, and Marc was slow to get up. It was a legal check, and Marc played for the rest of the season, setting career highs with 22 assists and 29 points. However, it was revealed before the Rangers' 2011 training camp began that Staal was suffering from post-concussion symptoms. He did not play until January 2, 2012, in the 2012 NHL Winter Classic against the Philadelphia Flyers. He only played 46 games in 2011–12, struggling to get his timing back from the injury as he posted a career-worst −7 and only five points (two goals and three assists). He got better as the season went on, however, and helped the Rangers reach the Eastern Conference Finals.

In Game 5 of the Eastern Conference Semifinals against the Washington Capitals, Staal scored a memorable overtime goal to give the Rangers a 3–2 win. After teammate Brad Richards had scored a rebound goal with 6.6 seconds left in regulation to send the game to overtime, Staal's powerplay slapshot from the point past Braden Holtby gave the Rangers a 3–2 win and a 3–2 series lead.

Staal continued his strong play into the lock-out-shortened 2012–13, averaging over 0.5 points per game for the first time in his career with 11 points (2 goals, 9 assists) in his first 21 games. However, during a game against the Philadelphia Flyers, in New York, on March 5, 2013, Staal suffered a scary eye injury. A slap-shot by Flyers defenceman Kimmo Timonen was deflected by Flyer forward Jakub Voráček into Staal's right eye, sending him to the ice. After the game, it was concluded that Staal suffered a small retinal tear in his right eye and an orbital fracture. The injury effectively ended his season, as he only played in one game the rest of the year, in the first round of the playoffs, before pulling himself from the line-up again. When he returned, he wore a visor for the first time in his career due to the nature of the injury.

In the 2013–14 season, Staal finally played a full season after his two injury-shortened seasons, with 72 regular season games and another 25 in the playoffs, helping the Rangers reach their first Stanley Cup Final in 20 years. His point totals were modest (three goals and 11 assists for 14 points during the regular season, and one goal and four assists in the playoffs), as he focused primarily on staying healthy and re-establishing his solid defensive presence. He was the third Staal brother to reach the Finals, after older brother Eric won in 2006 with the Hurricanes and younger brother Jordan was part of two consecutive finals with the Penguins in 2008 and 2009, winning the latter.

In January 2015 Staal signed a 6-year, $34.2 million contract extension, carrying a cap hit with an average annual value of $5.7 million. For the 2014–15 season Staal ended up playing 80 games in the regular season, the most he had played in since the 2009–10 season. He recorded 5 goals and 15 assists for 20 points, each the most he had recorded since the 2010–11 season. With his contributions the team finished the season with 53 wins and 113 points, both single-season franchise records, and which earned the team its seventh division title (second in four years) and third Presidents' Trophy. Staal played 19 games that postseason as the team reached the Eastern Conference Finals for the third time in four years, ultimately falling to the Tampa Bay Lightning in 7 games.

In the 2019–20 season, Staal played in his 842nd career game with the Rangers on October 5, 2019, passing Vic Hadfield for seventh-most played games played games in franchise history. On October 29, 2019, for the first time in his 13-year NHL career, Staal was a healthy scratch against the Tampa Bay Lightning.

==== Detroit Red Wings ====
On September 26, 2020, Staal, as one of the longest-tenured players in Rangers history, ended his affiliation with the team as he was traded to the Detroit Red Wings, along with a 2021 second-round pick, in exchange for future considerations.

On July 25, 2021, Staal signed a one-year, $2 million contract extension with the Red Wings.

On March 12, 2022, Staal played his 1,000th NHL game, which made him, Eric, and Jordan as the only trio of brothers in the NHL to play 1,000 games.

==== Florida Panthers ====
On July 13, 2022, having left the Red Wings as a free agent, Staal signed a one-year, $750,000 contract with the Florida Panthers.

In March 2023, Marc, along with his brother Eric, refused to wear Pride-themed jerseys in the pre-game warmups as a part of the Panthers' annual Pride Night; they cited their Christian faith as the reason for their decision. The rest of the Florida Panthers team members wore the jerseys during warmups to be later auctioned for charity.

The 2022–23 season concluded with the Panthers advancing to the 2023 Stanley Cup Final, which they lost to the Vegas Golden Knights 4–1.

==== Philadelphia Flyers and retirement ====
As a free agent after a season with the Panthers, Staal continued his playing career in agreeing to a one-year, $1.1 million contract with the Philadelphia Flyers for the 2023–24 season on July 3, 2023.

Following the 2023–24 season, Staal announced his retirement from ice hockey on September 5, 2024, and returned to the New York Rangers as a player development assistant.

== Personal life ==
Staal married his longtime girlfriend Lindsay Ruggles on August 12, 2011; they have known each other since high school. He proposed to her on December 25, 2010. The couple have three children: two daughters and a son.

In 2012, the Staal Brothers created the Staal Family Foundation, an organization that tries “to help improve the quality of life for children with cancer and their families.”

== Career statistics ==
=== Regular season and playoffs ===
			Regular season					Playoffs
Season	Team	League	GP	G	A	Pts	PIM	GP	G	A	Pts	PIM
2003–04	Sudbury Wolves	OHL	61	1	13	14	34	7	1	2	3	2
2004–05	Sudbury Wolves	OHL	65	6	20	26	53	12	0	4	4	15
2005–06	Sudbury Wolves	OHL	57	11	38	49	60	10	0	8	8	8
2005–06	Hartford Wolf Pack	AHL	—	—	—	—	—	12	0	2	2	8
2006–07	Sudbury Wolves	OHL	53	5	29	34	68	21	5	15	20	22
2007–08	New York Rangers	NHL	80	2	8	10	42	10	1	2	3	8
2008–09	New York Rangers	NHL	82	3	12	15	64	7	1	0	1	0
2009–10	New York Rangers	NHL	82	8	19	27	44	—	—	—	—	—
2010–11	New York Rangers	NHL	77	7	22	29	50	5	0	1	1	0
2011–12	New York Rangers	NHL	46	2	3	5	16	20	3	3	6	12
2012–13	New York Rangers	NHL	21	2	9	11	14	1	0	0	0	0
2013–14	New York Rangers	NHL	72	3	11	14	24	25	1	4	5	6
2014–15	New York Rangers	NHL	80	5	15	20	42	19	0	1	1	10
2015–16	New York Rangers	NHL	77	2	13	15	36	5	0	2	2	4
2016–17	New York Rangers	NHL	72	3	7	10	34	12	0	0	0	2
2017–18	New York Rangers	NHL	72	1	7	8	18	—	—	—	—	—
2018–19	New York Rangers	NHL	79	3	10	13	32	—	—	—	—	—
2019–20	New York Rangers	NHL	52	2	9	11	16	3	1	0	1	0
2020–21	Detroit Red Wings	NHL	56	3	7	10	20	—	—	—	—	—
2021–22	Detroit Red Wings	NHL	71	3	13	16	28	—	—	—	—	—
2022–23	Florida Panthers	NHL	82	3	12	15	43	21	0	0	0	10
2023–24	Philadelphia Flyers	NHL	35	1	4	5	14	—	—	—	—	—
NHL totals			1,136	53	181	234	537	128	7	13	20	52

=== International ===
Medal record

Representing Canada

Ice hockey

World Junior Championships
Gold medal – first place	2007 Sweden	
Gold medal – first place	2006 Canada	

Year	Team	Event	Result	GP	G	A	Pts	PIM
2004	Canada Ontario	WHC17	1st place, gold medalist(s)	6	0	1	1	2
2005	Canada	IH18	1st place, gold medalist(s)	5	0	0	0	2
2006	Canada	WJC	1st place, gold medalist(s)	6	0	1	1	4
2007	Canada	WJC	1st place, gold medalist(s)	6	0	0	0	4
2010	Canada	WC	7th	7	0	1	1	2
Junior totals				23	0	2	2	12
Senior totals				7	0	1	1	2

== See also ==
- Notable families in the NHL

Awards and achievements
Preceded by Lauri Korpikoski	New York Rangers first-round draft pick 2005	Succeeded by Bobby Sanguinetti
