= Geoff Ward (ice hockey) =

Canadian ice hockey coach

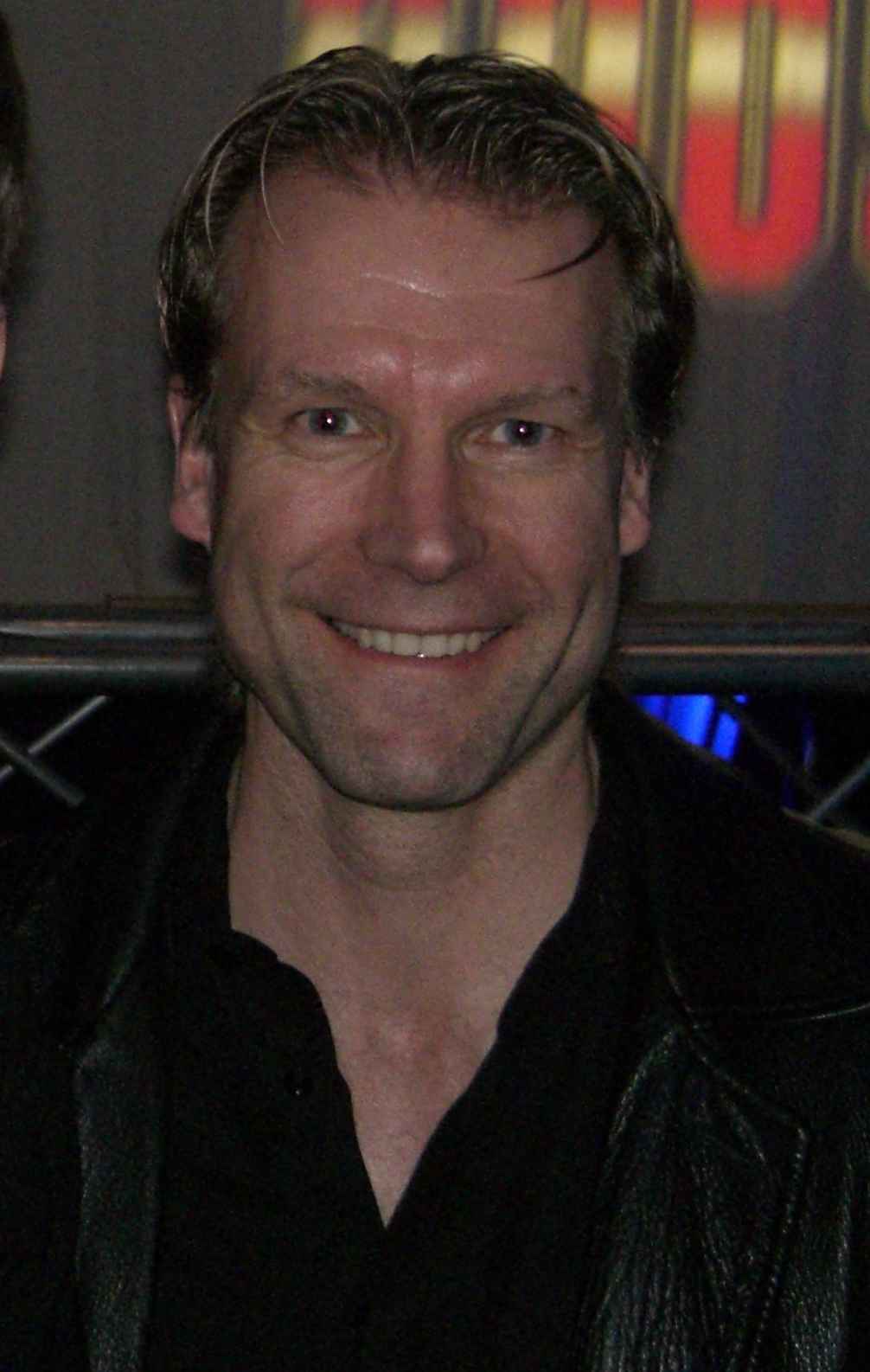
- Ward in 2007
- Born: April 8, 1962 (age 64) Waterloo, Ontario, Canada
- Current NL coach: Lausanne HC
- Coached for: Calgary Flames; Anaheim Ducks; New Jersey Devils; Boston Bruins
- Coaching career: 1989–present

Geoff Ward (born April 8, 1962) is a Canadian professional ice hockey coach who is the head coach for the Lausanne Hockey Club of the swiss National League. He previously worked in the National Hockey League (NHL) as the head coach of the Calgary Flames and as an assistant coach for the Anaheim Ducks, the New Jersey Devils, the Boston Bruins, and the Flames. He won the Stanley Cup with the Bruins in 2011.

== Career ==
Ward started his coaching career as an assistant at the University of Waterloo in 1989 and remained on the Warriors’ coaching staff for three years. In the 1993–94 season, Ward guided the Waterloo Siskins to an MWJHL championship and then served a five-year stint as head coach of the Kitchener Rangers in the Ontario Hockey League.

Ward's first coaching job in Europe came in the 2000–01 season, when he worked for German second-division side EC Bad Nauheim. Back in North America, while coaching the Hamilton Bulldogs, Ward was named the American Hockey League's Coach of the Year, winning the Louis A.R. Pieri Memorial Award for the 2002–03 AHL season. After two years with the Toronto Roadrunners/Edmonton Road Runners organization, he took over the Iserlohn Roosters of the German Deutsche Eishockey Liga, before embarking on a seven-year stint as assistant coach of the Boston Bruins, contributing to winning the Stanley Cup in 2011.

On June 19, 2014, it was announced that Ward would take over from Hans Zach as head coach for the German DEL pro hockey league's Adler Mannheim for the 2014–15 DEL season. He won the DEL Coach of the Year award and the DEL Championship that same year. Ward's team won the regular season championship and lost only one playoff game on its way to the finals, where the Adler squad defeated ERC Ingolstadt 4–2: Mannheim won the first game of the finals in overtime and then lost two in a row. Three consecutive wins secured the title in the best-of-seven series.

On June 17, 2015, Ward was named an assistant coach for the New Jersey Devils.

On May 31, 2018, the Calgary Flames announced that Ward, along with the Flames' AHL affiliate Stockton Heat's head coach Ryan Huska, would join the Flames as assistants under new head coach Bill Peters.

On November 26, 2019, Brad Treliving, the Flames' general manager, announced that Ward would assume the head coaching duties for the game against the Buffalo Sabres on November 27, while an investigation into allegations of racism and assault against Peters was conducted. Peters resigned on November 29 and Ward became the interim head coach. On September 14, 2020, Ward was formally named head coach.

On March 4, 2021, Ward was relieved of his duties as head coach after an 11–11–2 start to the season for the Flames. He was hired by Anaheim as an assistant to head coach Dallas Eakins on June 15, 2021.

Ward assumed the position of head coach of the Lausanne Hockey Club in May 2022. He led the team through the 2022–23 season in the Swiss ice hockey league National League. He had a significant impact on the team's development and contributed to its success during this period, leading to an appearance in the National League finals the following year.

Ward was named the National League's coach of the year in 2023-24, and after leading Lausanne to a first-place finish in the 2024-25 regular season, won the award for the second straight season.

== Head coaching record ==
=== NHL ===
Team	Year	Regular season						Postseason			
Team	Year	G	W	L	OTL	Pts	Finish	W	L	Win%	Result
CGY	2019–20	42*	24	15	3	(51)	4th in Pacific	5	5	.500	Lost in First Round (DAL)
CGY	2020–21	24	11	11	2	(24)	(fired)	—	—	—	—
Total		66	35	26	5			5	5	.500	1 playoff appearance

- Shortened season due to the COVID-19 pandemic during the 2019–20 season. Playoffs were played in August 2020 with a different format.

=== Other leagues ===
Team	Year	League	Regular season							Postseason											
Team	Year	League	G	W	L	T	OTL	Pts	Finish	W	L	Win%	Result								
KIT	1994–95	OHL	42	12	27	3	—	(27)	5th in Central	1	4	.200	Lost in Division Quarterfinals								
66	35	28	3	—	73	2nd in Central	5	7	.417	Lost in Quarterfinals	66	35	28	3	—	73	second in Central	5	7	.417	Lost in Quarterfinals
KIT	1996–97	OHL	66	34	22	10	—	78	1st in Central	6	7	.462	Lost in Semifinals								
KIT	1997–98	OHL	66	27	29	10	—	64	3rd in Central	2	4	.333	Lost in Division Quarterfinals								
GUE	1998–99	OHL	68	44	22	2	—	90	1st in Midwest	6	5	.545	Lost in Conference Semifinals								
ARK	1999–2000	ECHL	26	5	20	—	1	(11)	(fired)	—	—	—	—								
HAM	2002–03	AHL	35	16	13	5	1	(38)	1st in Canadian	14	9	.609	Lost in Calder Cup Final								
TOR	2003–04	AHL	80	35	34	8	3	81	5th in North	1	2	.333	Lost in Division Qualifier								
EDM	2004–05	AHL	80	32	33	—	15	79	6th in North	—	—	—	Missed playoffs								
ISE	2006–07	DEL	52	24	24	—	4	70	11th	—	—	—	Missed playoffs								
AM	2014–15	DEL	52	36	14	—	2	107	1st	12	3	.800	Won DEL Championship								
LHC	2022–23	NL	52	24	22	—	6	71	11th	—	—	—	Missed playoffs								
LHC	2023–24	NL	52	30	16	—	6	91	3rd	11	7	.611	Lost in Finals								
LHC	2024–25	NL	52	34	14	—	4	91	1st	-	-	-	Ongoing								

Preceded by Bill Peters	Head coach of the Calgary Flames; 2019–2021	Succeeded by Darryl Sutter
