= Don Hay =

Canadian ice hockey player and coach

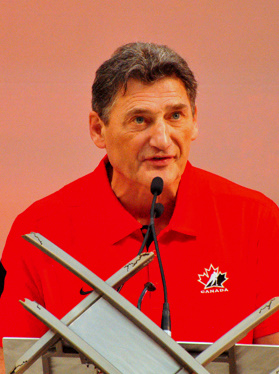
- Hay as head coach of Team Canada at the 2012 World Junior Hockey Championship
- Born: February 13, 1954 (age 72) Kamloops, British Columbia, Canada
- Height: 6 ft 0 in (183 cm)
- Weight: 190 lb (86 kg; 13 st 8 lb)
- Position: Right wing
- Shot: Right
- Played for: Lansing Lancers; Columbus Owls; Flint Generals; Philadelphia Firebirds
- NHL draft: 193rd overall, 1974; Minnesota North Stars
- WHA draft: 230th overall, 1974; Houston Aeros
- Playing career: 1974–1977

Don Hay (born February 13, 1954) is a Canadian former professional ice hockey player and National Hockey League (NHL) head coach.

As a player, Hay played shortly in the International Hockey League (IHL) before becoming a three-time Memorial Cup-winning coach, predominantly in the Western Hockey League (WHL) with brief stints in the NHL.

== Playing career ==
He was born in Kamloops, British Columbia. After three years of junior in the BCJHL and WCHL, Hay was drafted by the Minnesota North Stars in the 12th round, 193rd overall, of the 1974 NHL entry draft, as well as by the Houston Aeros in the 18th round, 230th overall, of the 1974 WHA Entry Draft. However, he never made it to either league as a player, and instead played in the minors during two seasons with the Lansing Lancers, Columbus Owls and Flint Generals of the IHL, and one season with the Philadelphia Firebirds of the NAHL.

== Coaching career ==
Hay began his coaching career in 1986–87 as an assistant coach with his hometown Kamloops Blazers of the WHL. After six years as an assistant, Hay took over the reins as the Blazers head coach in 1992–93 and immediately distinguished himself, subsequently leading his team to two President's Cup titles (1994, 1995) and two Memorial Cup titles (1994, 1995) in three years.

Hay's success in the major junior ranks caught the attention of the NHL, and after spending a year as an assistant coach with the Calgary Flames, Hay was named the head coach of the Phoenix Coyotes for the 1996–97 NHL season, their first year in Phoenix. Despite posting a respectable 38–37–7 record, Hay was let go by the Coyotes after a single season and after one more season in the NHL as an assistant coach with the Mighty Ducks of Anaheim, Hay returned to the WHL.

Immediately upon returning to major junior with the Tri-City Americans in 1998–99, Hay won the Dunc McCallum Memorial Trophy as WHL coach of the year; furthermore, he was prestigiously honoured as the WHL's best coach of all-time by the CHL. This earned him a second chance in the NHL, after two seasons with Tri-City, as the head coach of the Calgary Flames. His second stint in the NHL, however, was even shorter, as he was fired by the Flames just 68 games into the 2000–01 season. Overall, Hay coached 150 games in the NHL, compiling a record of 61–65–20–4.

Moving to the AHL, Hay coached the Utah Grizzlies from 2001 to 2004 before once again returning to the WHL to coach the Vancouver Giants, guiding them to a President's Cup title in 2006 and a Memorial Cup title in 2007. He was nominated once more for the Dunc McCallum Memorial Trophy in 2006, but lost to Willie Desjardins of the Medicine Hat Tigers.

On July 25, 2008, Hay was inducted into the BC Hockey Hall of Fame, along with former NHLers Steve Yzerman and Cliff Ronning. Leading the Giants to within 3 points of the Calgary Hitmen for their first WHL regular season title, he won his second Dunc McCallum Trophy for the 2008–09 season. On August 26, 2010, he agreed to a multi-year extension that was to keep him behind the Giants bench through 2015. However, Hay returned to coach the Kamloops Blazers for the 2014-15 season. And on May 27, 2011, Hay was named head coach of the 2012 Canadian World Junior Hockey Championship team. Hay had previously won gold at the tournament with the Canadians in 1995 in Red Deer, Alta. On April 28, 2013, he coached Canada's U-18 men's team to a Gold Medal against the United States, in Sochi, Russia.

In 2014, he returned to Kamloops Blazers as head coach after 19 seasons away from the team. After four more seasons of coaching, Hay retired in 2018 and became an adviser for the Blazers. In August 2018, Hay was hired by the Portland Winterhawks to be an assistant coach.

== Awards and achievements ==
At the start of the 2006–07 season, his second with the Giants, Hay became the fourteenth head coach in WHL history to win 300 games. Two seasons later, Hay became the ninth coach to win 400 games, defeating the Brandon Wheat Kings 4–3 on November 1, 2008. On January 27, 2018, Hay became the all-time leader in the WHL coaching victories, with his 743rd regular season win.

- President's Cup/Ed Chynoweth Cup – 1994, 1995, 2006
- Memorial Cup – 1994, 1995, 2007
- Dunc McCallum Memorial Trophy (WHL Coach of the Year) – 1999, 2009
- British Columbia Hockey Hall of Fame – 2008

== Playing statistics ==
			Regular season					Playoffs
Season	Team	League	GP	G	A	Pts	PIM	GP	G	A	Pts	PIM
1971–72	Kamloops Rockets	BCJHL	46	10	24	34	43	–	–	–	–	–
1972–73	Kamloops Rockets	BCJHL	Incomplete
1972–73	Calgary Centennials	WCHL	31	1	1	2	24
1973–74	New Westminster Bruins	WCHL	68	19	46	65	174
1974–75	Lansing Lancers/Columbus Owls	IHL	71	13	33	46	153	5	1	0	1	29
1975–76	Columbus Owls	IHL	13	3	4	7	60
1975–76	Flint Generals	IHL	56	9	21	30	138	2	0	0	0	0
1976–77	Philadelphia Firebirds	NAHL	74	20	15	35	96	4	0	2	2	4
WCHL totals			99	20	47	67	198
IHL totals			140	25	58	83	491	7	1	0	1	29

== Coaching statistics ==
Team	Year	Regular season							Postseason
Team	Year	G	W	L	T	OTL	Pts	Finish	Result
PHX	1996–97	82	38	37	7	-	83	3rd in Central	Lost in First round (ANA)
CGY	2000–01	68	23	28	13	4	(73)	4th in Northwest	(Fired)
NHL Totals		150	61	65	20	4			

Team	Year	Regular season							Postseason
Team	Year	G	W	L	T	OTL	Pts	Finish	Result
UTA	2001–02	80	40	29	6	5	91	3rd in West	Lost in First round (HOU)
UTA	2002–03	80	37	34	4	5	83	5th in West	Lost preliminary (WBS)
UTA	2003–04	80	27	42	6	5	65	7th in West	Missed Playoffs
AHL Totals		240	104	105	16	15			

Team	Year	Regular season							Postseason
Team	Year	G	W	L	T	OTL	Pts	Finish	Result
KAM	1992–93	72	42	28	2	—	86	3rd in West	Lost in Third round (POR)
KAM	1993–94	72	50	16	6	—	106	1st in West	Won Memorial Cup (LAV)
KAM	1994–95	72	52	14	6	—	110	1st in West	Won Memorial Cup (DET)
TC	1998–99	72	43	23	6	—	92	2nd in West	Lost in Third round (KAM)
TC	1999–00	72	24	39	7	2	57	6th in West	Lost in First round (SPK)
VAN	2004–05	72	34	30	—	4	76	3rd in B.C.	Lost in Round one (KEL)
VAN	2005–06	72	47	19	—	6	100	1st in B.C.	Won President's Cup (MJ)
VAN	2006–07	72	45	17	—	10	100	1st in B.C	Won Memorial Cup (MH)
VAN	2007–08	72	49	15	—	8	106	1st in B.C.	Lost in Second round (SPK)
VAN	2008–09	72	57	10	—	5	119	1st in B.C.	Lost in Third round (KEL)
VAN	2009–10	72	41	25	—	6	88	1st in B.C.	Lost in Third round (TC)
VAN	2010–11	72	35	32	—	5	75	2nd in B.C.	Lost in First round (TC)
VAN	2011–12	72	40	26	—	2	86	2nd in B.C.	Lost in First round (SPK)
VAN	2012–13	72	21	49	—	2	44	5th in B.C.	Out of playoffs
VAN	2013–14	72	32	29	—	7	75	3rd in B.C.	Lost in First round (POR)
KAM	2014–15	72	28	37	—	7	63	4th in B.C.	Out of playoffs
KAM	2015–16	72	38	25	—	9	85	3rd in B.C.	Lost in First round (KEL)
KAM	2016–17	72	42	24	—	6	90	3rd in B.C.	Lost in First round (KEL)
KAM	2017–18	72	30	37	—	5	65	4th in B.C.	Out of playoffs
WHL Totals		1,368	750	495	27	84			

Preceded by Pierre Page	Head coach of the Calgary Flames; 2000–01	Succeeded by Greg Gilbert
Preceded by Position created	Head coach of the Phoenix Coyotes; 1996–97	Succeeded by Jim Schoenfeld
