= Bernie Geoffrion =

Canadian ice hockey player (1931–2006)

- Hockey Hall of Fame, 1972
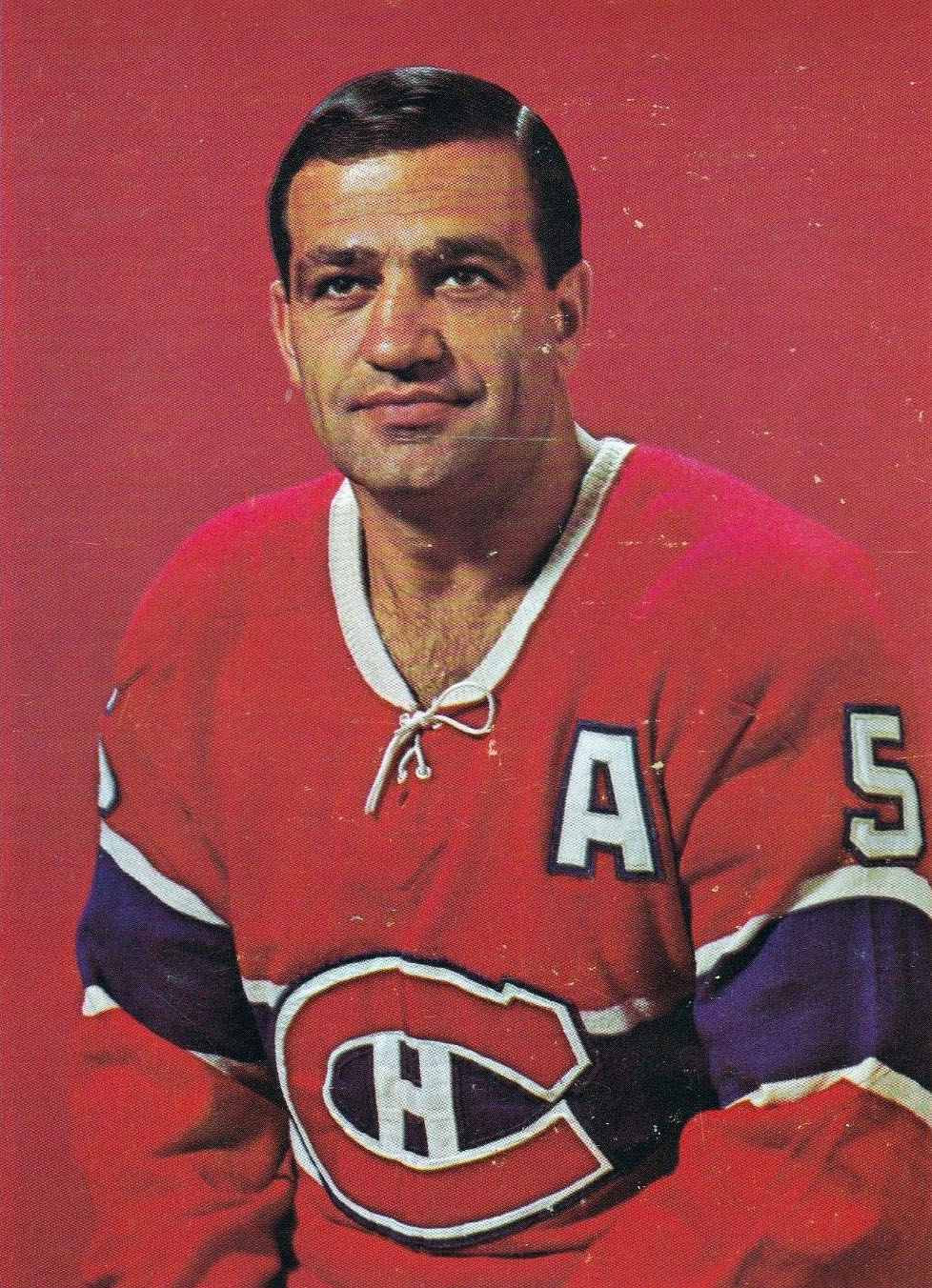
- Geoffrion with the Montreal Canadiens, c. 1963
- Born: February 16, 1931 Montreal, Quebec, Canada
- Died: March 11, 2006 (aged 75) Atlanta, Georgia, U.S.
- Height: 5 ft 9 in (175 cm)
- Weight: 166 lb (75 kg; 11 st 12 lb)
- Position: Right wing
- Shot: Right
- Played for: Montreal Canadiens; New York Rangers
- Playing career: 1950–1964, 1966–1968

Joseph André Bernard Geoffrion (French pronunciation: [ʒɔfʁjɔ̃]; February 16, 1931 – March 11, 2006), nicknamed "Boom Boom" or "Boum Boum", was a Canadian professional ice hockey player and coach. Generally considered one of the innovators of the slapshot, he was inducted into the Hockey Hall of Fame in 1972 following a 16-year career with the Montreal Canadiens and New York Rangers of the National Hockey League (NHL). In 2017 Geoffrion was named one of the '100 Greatest NHL Players' in history.

== Playing career ==
Geoffrion was born in Montreal, Quebec, and began playing in the NHL in 1951. He earned the nickname "Boom Boom" for his thundering slapshot (which Geoffrion claimed to have 'invented' as a youngster ) from sportswriter Charlie Boire of the Montreal Star in the late 1940s while playing junior hockey for the Laval Nationale. He was the second player in NHL history to score 50 goals in one season, the first being teammate Maurice Richard. Half the time, he played left-wing on Montreal's front line with fellow superstars Richard and Jean Béliveau, helping the Canadiens to six Stanley Cup championships, and at other times was right wing on the No. 2 line. But Geoffrion had a hard time convincing the NHL of his considerable talents; Maurice Richard, Jean Beliveau, Bobby Hull (Chicago Black Hawks) and Gordie Howe (Detroit Red Wings) were so good that they overshadowed him. Even after Geoffrion won the Art Ross Trophy as league scoring champion in 1955, NHL First All-Star honours went to Richard, while Geoffrion only was selected to the second.

However, Geoffrion's resulting anger was nothing compared to the Montreal Forum fans when Geoffrion scored one goal while crowd-favourite Richard was suspended, and at the time had led the NHL scoring race. The Red Wings beat the Canadiens in the final round in seven games that year, exactly the same result of the previous season. "I couldn't deliberately not score, that isn't the point of hockey, Montreal", complained Geoffrion, but fans regardless kept catcalling and jeering him. "I was so feeling the urge to vomit; I felt terrible", Geoffrion emotionally admitted. "Even thinking about hockey made me feel bad, man did I want to leave. If it had not been for Jean (Béliveau) and Maurice (Richard) visiting, I would have. Usually, it's not too much to expect to be on the First (All-Star) Team when you have more points than anyone else."

Early in his playing career, he had a reputation for letting his temper get the best of him. One such example occurred late in the second period of a Canadiens' 3–1 loss to the Rangers at Madison Square Garden on December 20, 1953. With a two-handed swing, Geoffrion's stick made contact with the left side of Ron Murphy's face, resulting in a broken jaw and concussion. The injuries ended Murphy's season. Geoffrion was suspended for the remaining matches between the two teams in that campaign.

In a testament to the rough-and-tumble style of play of that era, Geoffrion broke his nose six times, and received over 400 stitches. In 1958, a training accident severely injured him and his life was saved by emergency surgery. Despite advice from his doctors to stop playing for a season, Geoffrion was on the ice six weeks later to take part in the 1958 Stanley Cup Final.

Geoffrion first retired in 1964 and became head coach of les As de Québec of the American Hockey League (AHL), but returned two seasons later to play for the New York Rangers. Likely the reason for his first retirement was Béliveau, getting appointed team captain in 1961, even though Geoffrion was one of three alternate captains and Béliveau was not. This was following the Rocket's retirement in 1960 and Doug Harvey's trade to the Rangers in 1961 (he only lasted a year with the C).

"If I didn't keep suffering all those terrible injuries and yet keep coming back, if I weren't fit to lead, would I have gotten the C and kept playing?" asked Geoffrion, who had, in the 1961 semifinals, hurt a leg and insisted, even so, that Harvey cut a cast off it so he could play. "Yes, I think I would. There were times when everybody kept telling me to quit. My doctor even told me I should stop playing, but I came back."

== Coaching career ==
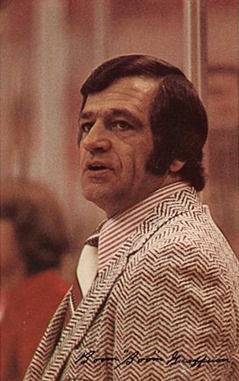
1972 photo of Bernie Geoffrion for Atlanta Flames

In 1968 he finally retired as a player and became coach of the Rangers, but resigned after only 43 games due to ulcers in his stomach. In 1972 he became the first coach of the Atlanta Flames, and held the position for two and a half seasons, leading them to their first playoff appearance in 1974. However, 52 games into his third season, he had to resign due to health problems yet again. Geoffrion moved to the Flames' broadcast booth, where he became the colour commentator alongside veteran play-by-play man Jiggs McDonald. He realized a longtime dream of coaching his beloved Canadiens in 1979, but his recurring stomach ailment forced him to step down mid-season.

In the 1970s and into the 1980s, Geoffrion appeared in several television commercials for Miller Lite beer, part of their stable of retired athletes-turned-spokesmen which also included Billy Martin and Bob Uecker.

== Family ==
Geoffrion was the son of Jean-Baptiste Geoffrion, a restaurant owner, and his wife, Florina Poitras. He grew up in Drolet, a suburb east of Montreal. Geoffrion was a direct descendant of Pierre Joffrion and his wife Marie Priault, early French settlers in the colony of Montreal. Marie Priault was a King's Daughter.

Geoffrion's wife Marlene was the daughter of fellow Hockey Hall of Famer Howie Morenz and the great-niece of the wife of Billy Coutu, the only player banned from the NHL for life. Geoffrion's son Dan played five seasons of professional hockey, which included stops with the Quebec Nordiques of the World Hockey Association in 1978–79, Canadiens in 1979–80 (with his father as coach), and Winnipeg Jets in 1980–81. His grandson Blake Geoffrion played for the Nashville Predators and Montreal Canadiens in the NHL. Dan's younger sons, Sebastian and Brice, played for the University of Alabama in Huntsville Chargers. Geoffrion's son-in-law, Hartland Monahan, played in the NHL for several teams in the 1970s, and his grandson Shane Monahan played Major League Baseball for the Seattle Mariners in the late 1990s. He, like several former Atlanta Flames players, remained in Atlanta after their careers ended. He lived in Marietta, Georgia, until his death.

== Retired number ==
The Canadiens announced on October 15, 2005, that Geoffrion's uniform number, 5, would be retired on March 11, 2006. On March 8, Geoffrion was diagnosed with stomach cancer after a surgical procedure uncovered it. Doctors attempted to remove the tumour but found that the cancer had spread. Geoffrion died in Atlanta, Georgia, on March 11, the day his jersey number was to be retired. During his remarks at the pre-game retirement ceremony, Geoffrion's son Bob recounted how his parents had once gone to a boxing match at the Montreal Forum and that Geoffrion had told his wife Marlene that his own number would someday hang from the rafters beside that of her father, Howie Morenz. Fulfilling that prophecy, and in further recognition of the special link between the Morenz and Geoffrion families, the two numbers were raised side by side at the Bell Centre. The banner for Morenz's number 7 was lowered halfway, then raised back up to the rafters alongside Geoffrion's banner. Traded to the Montreal Canadiens by the Nashville Predators on February 17, 2012, Blake Geoffrion decided to honour both his grandfather Geoffrion, as well as his great-grandfather Morenz, by wearing #57.

== Awards ==
- Calder Memorial Trophy - 1952
- NHL All-Star Game - 1952, 1953, 1954, 1955, 1956, 1958, 1959, 1960, 1961, 1962, 1963
- NHL Second All-Star Team - 1955, 1960
- Art Ross Trophy - 1955, 1961
- Stanley Cup champion - 1953, 1956, 1957, 1958, 1959, 1960
- Hart Memorial Trophy - 1961
- NHL First All-Star Team - 1961
- His #5 was retired by the Montreal Canadiens on March 11, 2006
- In 1998, he was ranked number 42 on The Hockey News' list of the 100 Greatest Hockey Players.
- In 2017, Geoffrion was named one of the '100 Greatest NHL Players' in history.

== Career statistics ==
=== Regular season and playoffs ===
			Regular season					Playoffs
Season	Team	League	GP	G	A	Pts	PIM	GP	G	A	Pts	PIM
1946–47	Montreal Concordia Civics	QJHL	26	7	8	15	6	—	—	—	—	—
1947–48	Laval Nationale	QJHL	29	20	15	35	49	11	7	5	12	11
1947–48	Laval Nationale	M-Cup	—	—	—	—	—	8	3	2	5	11
1948–49	Laval Nationale	QJHL	42	41	35	76	49	9	3	6	9	22
1949–50	Laval Nationale	QJHL	34	52	34	86	77	3	6	0	6	8
1949–50	Montreal Royals	QSHL	1	0	0	0	0	—	—	—	—	—
1950–51	Montreal Nationale	QJHL	36	54	44	98	80	—	—	—	—	—
1950–51	Montreal Canadiens	NHL	18	8	6	14	9	11	1	1	2	6
1951–52	Montreal Canadiens	NHL	67	30	24	54	66	11	3	1	4	6
1952–53	Montreal Canadiens	NHL	65	22	17	39	37	12	6	4	10	12
1953–54	Montreal Canadiens	NHL	54	29	25	54	87	11	6	5	11	18
1954–55	Montreal Canadiens	NHL	70	38	37	75	57	12	8	5	13	8
1955–56	Montreal Canadiens	NHL	59	29	33	62	66	10	5	9	14	6
1956–57	Montreal Canadiens	NHL	41	19	21	40	18	10	11	7	18	2
1957–58	Montreal Canadiens	NHL	42	27	23	50	51	10	6	5	11	2
1958–59	Montreal Canadiens	NHL	59	22	44	66	30	11	5	8	13	10
1959–60	Montreal Canadiens	NHL	59	30	41	71	36	8	2	10	12	4
1960–61	Montreal Canadiens	NHL	64	50	45	95	29	4	2	1	3	0
1961–62	Montreal Canadiens	NHL	62	23	36	59	36	5	0	1	1	6
1962–63	Montreal Canadiens	NHL	51	23	18	41	73	5	0	1	1	4
1963–64	Montreal Canadiens	NHL	55	21	18	39	41	7	1	1	2	4
1966–67	New York Rangers	NHL	58	17	25	42	42	4	2	0	2	0
1967–68	New York Rangers	NHL	59	5	16	21	11	1	0	1	1	0
NHL totals			883	393	429	822	689	132	58	60	118	88

== Coaching record ==
Team	Year	Regular season						Post season
Team	Year	G	W	L	T	Pts	Finish	
NYR	1968–69	43	22	18	3	(47)	3rd in East	Resigned due to health problems
ATL	1972–73	78	25	38	15	65	7th in West	Missed playoffs
ATL	1973–74	78	30	34	14	74	4th in West	Lost in quarter-finals
ATL	1974–75	52	20	22	10	(54)	4th in West	Fired midseason
MTL	1979–80	30	15	9	6	(36)	1st in Norris	Resigned due to health problems
Total		281	114	119	48			

== See also ==
- List of National Hockey League retired numbers
- List of players with five or more goals in an NHL game
- List of family relations in the NHL

Preceded by Terry Sawchuk	Winner of the Calder Memorial Trophy; 1952	Succeeded by Lorne "Gump" Worsley
Preceded by Gordie Howe	Winner of the Art Ross Trophy; 1955	Succeeded by Jean Beliveau
Preceded by Bobby Hull	Winner of the Art Ross Trophy; 1961	Succeeded by Bobby Hull
Preceded by Gordie Howe	Winner of the Hart Memorial Trophy; 1961	Succeeded by Jacques Plante
Preceded by Emile Francis	Head coach of the New York Rangers; 1968–69	Succeeded by Emile Francis
Preceded by Position created	Head coach of the Atlanta Flames; 1972–75	Succeeded by Fred Creighton
Preceded by Scotty Bowman	Head coach of the Montreal Canadiens; 1979	Succeeded by Claude Ruel
