= Metro Ice Arena =

Indoor arena in Lansing, Michigan

Coordinates: 42°44′30.5″N 84°37′12.0″W

Metro Ice Arena was a 4,600-capacity, 34,000 square foot indoor arena located in Lansing, Michigan, United States. It hosted the International Hockey League's Lansing Lancers in the 1974–75 season. The venue was converted to a movie theater in the early 1980s.

== Types of events held ==
Metro Ice Arena held a number of events during its time open, including rock concerts, public skating, hockey leagues, professional wrestling, and similar activities.

As of 2019, an investment group purchased the property and has plans to host the Lansing City Futstal franchise and planned to turn the arena into a "one-stop destination for sports and entertainment."
