= Al MacNeil =

Canadian ice hockey player and coach (1935–2025)

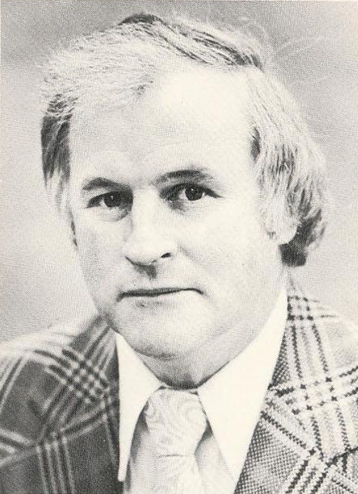
- Born: September 27, 1935 Sydney, Nova Scotia, Canada
- Died: January 5, 2025 (aged 89) Calgary, Alberta, Canada
- Height: 178 cm (5 ft 10 in)
- Weight: 83 kg (183 lb; 13 st 1 lb)
- Position: Defence
- Shot: Left
- Played for: Toronto Maple Leafs; Montreal Canadiens; Chicago Black Hawks; New York Rangers; Pittsburgh Penguins
- Coached for: NHL Montreal Canadiens; NHL Atlanta/Calgary Flames; CHL Houston Apollos; AHL Montreal/Nova Scotia Voyagers
- Playing career: 1956–1970
- Coaching career: 1968–1977, 1979–1982, 2001, 2002

Allister Wences MacNeil (September 27, 1935 – January 5, 2025) was a Canadian professional ice hockey player, coach and executive. MacNeil played 524 games in the National Hockey League and was a four-time Stanley Cup winner. He was the first native of Atlantic Canada to serve as a head coach in the NHL. He won three Stanley Cups with the Montreal Canadiens, first as the team's rookie head coach in 1971, and then back-to-back championships as Director of Player Personnel in 1978 and 1979. He went back into coaching in 1979, becoming the last head coach of the Atlanta Flames and then the first one for the Calgary Flames in 1980. As an NHL head coach, with the Canadiens and Flames, his career win-loss-tie total was 160–134–55. The final time he won a Stanley Cup was as the assistant general manager of the Calgary Flames in 1989.

MacNeil won three Calder Cup Championships as the general manager and head coach of the Montreal Canadiens' farm team, the Nova Scotia Voyageurs, in 1972, 1976 and 1977. He was twice selected as American Hockey League Coach of the Year in 1972 and 1977. In 2014, his coaching career was celebrated when he was inducted into the AHL Hall of Fame.

== Early life ==
Allister Wences "Al" MacNeil was born on September 27, 1935, in Sydney, Cape Breton Island, Nova Scotia. He grew up in the steel town and played his first hockey there. As a junior player in the Toronto Maple Leafs organization, he moved to Weston, Ontario, going to high school there on a scholarship and playing with the Weston Dukes in 1953. He won back-to-back Memorial Cups with the Toronto Marlboros, in 1955, and then, as captain of the team, in 1956. 1956—57 was his first year as a professional hockey player, as he made the Leafs team and played 53 games that season for them. In 1960—61 he captained, and was an all-star defenceman for, the Eastern Professional Hockey League's Hull-Ottawa Canadiens. His team won the league's championship that year.

== NHL playing career ==
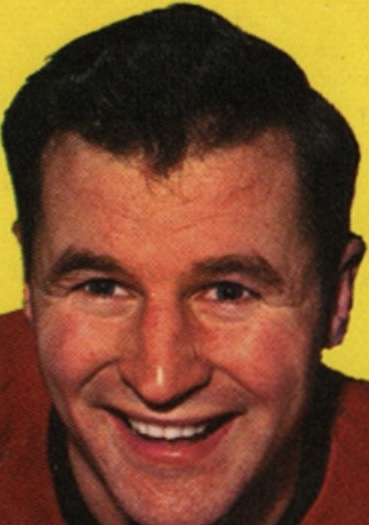
MacNeil from 1963 Topps card

As a defenceman, MacNeil participated in parts of eleven seasons in the National Hockey League (NHL), from 1956 to 1968. He played in a total of 524 NHL games with the Toronto Maple Leafs, Montreal Canadiens, Chicago Black Hawks, New York Rangers, and Pittsburgh Penguins.

== Managerial career ==
Between 1968 and 1970, he became a player-coach in the Montreal Canadiens' farm team system. He started with the Central Hockey League's (CHL) Houston Apollos, a Canadiens affiliate in Houston, Texas. This was their final season in Houston, and the franchise moved to Montreal, and joined the American Hockey League (AHL) as the Montreal Voyageurs in June 1969. He continued as a player/coach in Montreal for the 1969–70 AHL season. After a successful debut as a minor-league coach, MacNeil became an assistant coach to Claude Ruel of the NHL Canadiens for the 1970–71 season on September 8, 1970.

=== Montreal Canadiens ===
During the beginning of the 1970–71 season, the Canadiens struggled to win, and were in danger of missing the playoffs for a second straight year. Head coach Ruel resigned 23 games into the season and MacNeil took over the helm on December 3, 1970. The appointment made him the first native of Atlantic Canada to serve as a head coach in the NHL. His first game as coach went well, as the Canadiens won over the St. Louis Blues, including beating his future Calgary Flames Stanley Cup winning coach, Terry Crisp, who was a Blues centre at the time.

==== 1971 NHL playoffs run ====
Canadiens general manager, Sam Pollock, bolstered the club when he swung a major trade to net top-scoring left-wing Frank Mahovlich from the Detroit Red Wings on January 13, 1971. The Canadiens rallied to qualify for the playoffs as the third seed in their division. The Canadiens stunned the heavily favoured, league-leading, Boston Bruins in the opening round of the playoffs by beating them four games to three in the quarter final round. They then defeated the Minnesota North Stars in the semifinals. Unexpectedly, they made it to the Stanley Cup Final, playing the Chicago Black Hawks, and then beating them four games to three after having been behind in this series 3–2. Game seven was in Chicago, and at the end of the second period, the score was tied at 2–2 after. The Canadiens scored the winning goal early in the third period to take the series and the championship, with Henri Richard scoring both the equalizer and game-winner. MacNeil and Richard hugged at the end of the game, but that did little to patch up their differences.

Crucial to the Stanley Cup victory was MacNeil's decision to use rookie goaltender Ken Dryden in the playoffs despite Dryden having played only six regular-season games in 1970–71. MacNeil was presumably impressed that Dryden won all these regular games, allowing only nine goals for a 1.65 goals against average (GAA). Another crucial choice was having rookie Réjean Houle shadow the Black Hawks' star goal scorer Bobby Hull. Houle held Hull to only one even-strength goal in the finals series.

==== Coaching decisions ====
As a unilingual English-speaker, MacNeil had a challenging relationship with some of the team's francophone players, most notably Henri Richard. He was the first Canadiens coach in recent memory who could not speak French. When MacNeil benched Richard during the final series against the Black Hawks, Richard publicly criticized the coach, calling him incompetent. Because he benched fan-favourite Richard during the playoffs, he received death threats and had to get police protection. The death threats were taken seriously because of the politically volatile environment in Montreal only a few months after the October Crisis. Sports writers noted and praised MacNeil's calm coolness in the wake of Richard's comments.

After the Stanley Cup victory, there was a question of whether MacNeil would remain as the coach, especially after what seemed like a player revolt during the playoffs. He ended weeks of speculation from the press and the public when he resigned in early June as head coach of the Canadiens, with Sam Pollock replacing him with Scotty Bowman.

==== Nova Scotia (AHL) ====
He stayed with the Canadiens' organization, moving to take over as general manager and head coach of their American Hockey League farm team, the Nova Scotia Voyageurs. MacNeil won three Calder Cup Championships (1972, 1976, 1977) in six years with the Voyageurs.

In 1971–72, he led the Voyageurs, also known as the Vees, to a 41–21–14 record and their first Calder Cup championship, earning the Louis A.R. Pieri Award as the league's outstanding coach. Nova Scotia returned to the Finals in 1973 and qualified for the playoffs again in 1974 and 1975 under MacNeil's direction.

MacNeil's Voyageurs posted two of the greatest back-to-back seasons in AHL history in 1975–76 and 1976–77, combining for 100 regular-season wins. On April 29, 1976, with over 6,000 fans at the Halifax Forum, the Vees took on the Hershey Bears in the deciding game of the Calder Cup Finals. MacNeil's team won the deciding game in dramatic fashion, with an overtime goal to win the game 5–4 and take the 1976 Calder Cup. MacNeil claimed it was his sweetest victory and this was the best team, on and off the ice, that he had had the honour of coaching. This squad's performance over the 1975–76 season allowed MacNeil win his second Pieri Award in 1976.

In 1976–77, the Voyageurs had another 100-point season. The Vees played the Rochester Americans in finals. On April 30, 1977, before a crowd of over 7,200 fans at the sold out Rochester War Memorial Arena, the Vees beat the Americans 4–3 in the decisive sixth game. It was their second consecutive Calder trophy and the third overall for MacNeil.

His Nova Scotia team had four 100-point campaigns in his six years as head coach. With a 304–149–78 record in his six seasons as an AHL head coach, he has the highest winning percentage (.646) in league history. He was only one of six coaches that ever won three Calder Cups, and also one of six people ever to coach championship teams in both the AHL and the NHL. Players who skated under MacNeil's tutelage in the AHL include Hockey Hall of Fame members Larry Robinson, Bob Gainey, Steve Shutt and Guy Lapointe. On October 10, 2013, it was announced MacNeil had been named to the AHL's 2014 Hall of Fame class, alongside Bob Perreault, John Slaney and Bill Dineen. He was inducted into the Hall on February 12, 2014, at the AHL All-Star game festivities in St. John's, Newfoundland.

==== Canadiens executive ====
After the 1976–77 AHL season, MacNeil's contract expired at the end of June, prompting interest from other NHL clubs to hire him as their coach. Punch Imlach, the general manager for the Buffalo Sabres made an offer of $100,000 for five years but MacNeil turned it down. On August 3, 1977, MacNeil signed a new contract with the Canadiens to stay in Halifax as general manager and coach, and play home games in the inaugural season of the new Halifax Metro Centre arena. Pollock then promoted MacNeil within the Canadiens organization, becoming the Director of Player Personnel in Montreal. He won two more Stanley Cups as a Canadiens executive in 1978 and 1979. A major change happened within the Canadiens' management when Pollock retired as general manager in September 1978, and was replaced by Irving Grundman, a Pollock protégé.

=== Atlanta/Calgary Flames ===
On June 7, 1979, MacNeil resigned from his position with the Canadiens, and Flames general manager Cliff Fletcher introduced him to Atlanta's media as the successor to Fred Creighton as the third-ever head coach of the Atlanta Flames. He remained in that capacity through the franchise's move to Calgary. On May 31, 1982, general manager Fletcher removed MacNeil as coach, and promoted him to director of player development and professional scouting. MacNeil won his fourth Stanley Cup in 1989 as Calgary's assistant general manager.

On December 10, 2001, the NHL suspended Greg Gilbert, the Flames head coach, for two games for his role in a brawl with the Mighty Ducks of Anaheim on December 8, 2001. Gilbert was replaced by Al MacNeil, who then made his first appearance as an NHL head coach since April 1, 1982. The Flames played the Scotty Bowman-coached Detroit Red Wings in Calgary, and shut them out them 2–0. The game gave MacNeil his first victory in 19 years, eight months and nine days. He didn't officially get credit for the win, as Gilbert was still the coach of record.

When Gilbert was fired the following season — on December 3, 2002 — because of the Flames' poor performance, MacNeil once again assumed interim head coaching duties. The Flames took 25 days to replace Gilbert, and in that time they went 4–5–2 under MacNeil. That gave him a career NHL games coached win-loss-tie total record of 160–134–55, a figure that combines both regular season and playoff results. Darryl Sutter was finally hired as the permanent coach, and MacNeil returned to being a special assistant to general manager Craig Button.

== Personal life and death ==
Al MacNeil was married to Norma MacNeil (née MacSween) from New Waterford on Cape Breton Island. They had two children, a daughter Allison, and a son Allister. He had two grandsons from his daughter. His descendants are involved with professional hockey as his son is a scout for the Calgary Flames. His grandson, Jack Sparkes, was drafted by the Los Angeles Kings in the 2022 NHL entry draft.

MacNeil is a member of the American Hockey League Hall of Fame, the Nova Scotia Sport Hall of Fame and the Cape Breton Sports Hall of Fame. On November 15, 2015, he was featured on a Sportsnet national broadcast as part of a tribute to Cape Bretoners that were affiliated with the NHL, on Rogers Hometown Hockey Tour. MacNeil was honoured by his hometown when Cape Breton University bestowed him with an honorary Doctor of Laws (honoris causa) degree in 2011.

MacNeil died in Calgary on January 5, 2025, at the age of 89.

== Career statistics ==
=== Regular season and playoffs ===
			Regular season					Playoffs
Season	Team	League	GP	G	A	Pts	PIM	GP	G	A	Pts	PIM
1954–55	Toronto Marlboros	OHA	47	3	16	19	0	—	—	—	—	—
1955–56	Toronto Marlboros	OHA	48	9	12	21	0	—	—	—	—	—
1955–56	Toronto Maple Leafs	NHL	1	0	0	0	2	—	—	—	—	—
1956–57	Rochester Americans	AHL	13	0	4	4	35	—	—	—	—	—
1956–57	Toronto Maple Leafs	NHL	53	4	8	12	84	—	—	—	—	—
1957–58	Rochester Americans	AHL	54	3	18	21	91	—	—	—	—	—
1957–58	Toronto Maple Leafs	NHL	13	0	0	0	9	—	—	—	—	—
1958–59	Rochester Americans	AHL	69	4	13	17	119	5	1	1	2	17
1959–60	Rochester Americans	AHL	49	4	16	20	44	12	1	2	3	12
1959–60	Toronto Maple Leafs	NHL	4	0	0	0	2	—	—	—	—	—
1960–61	Hull-Ottawa Canadiens	EPHL	60	6	20	26	101	14	2	4	6	21
1961–62	Montreal Canadiens	NHL	61	1	7	8	74	5	0	0	0	2
1962–63	Chicago Black Hawks	NHL	70	2	19	21	100	4	0	1	1	4
1963–64	Chicago Black Hawks	NHL	70	5	19	24	91	7	0	2	2	25
1964–65	Chicago Black Hawks	NHL	69	3	7	10	119	14	0	1	1	34
1965–66	Chicago Black Hawks	NHL	51	0	1	1	34	3	0	0	0	0
1966–67	New York Rangers	NHL	58	0	4	4	44	4	0	0	0	2
1967–68	Pittsburgh Penguins	NHL	74	2	10	12	58	—	—	—	—	—
1968–69	Houston Apollos	CHL	70	1	11	12	70	3	0	1	1	0
1969–70	Montreal Voyageurs	AHL	66	0	10	10	14	8	0	1	1	0
NHL totals			524	17	75	92	617	37	0	4	4	67

Source: Hockey Reference

=== Coaching record ===
Team	Year	Regular season							Postseason			
Team	Year	G	W	L	T	OTL	Pts	Finish	W	L	Win %	Result
MTL	1970–71	55	31	15	9	-	(97)	3rd in East	12	8	.600	Won Stanley Cup (CHI)
ATL	1979–80	80	35	32	13	-	83	4th in Patrick	1	3	.250	Lost in First Round (NYR)
CGY	1980–81	80	39	27	14	-	92	3rd in Patrick	9	7	.563	Lost in Conference Finals (MNS)
CGY	1981–82	80	29	34	17	-	75	4th in Patrick	0	3	.000	Lost in First Round (VAN)
CGY	2002–03	11	4	5	2	0	(75)	(interim)				
Total		306	138	113	55	0			22	21	.512	4 playoff appearances 1 Stanley Cup title

Source: Hockey Reference

Preceded by Claude Ruel	Head coach of the Montreal Canadiens; 1970–71	Succeeded by Scotty Bowman
Preceded by Fred Creighton	Head coach of the Atlanta Flames; 1979–80	Succeeded by Himself; Calgary Flames head coach
Preceded by Himself; Atlanta Flames head coach	Head coach of the Calgary Flames; 1980–82	Succeeded by Bob Johnson
Preceded by Greg Gilbert	Head coach of the Calgary Flames; 2002–03	Succeeded by Darryl Sutter
