= List of Calgary Flames head coaches =

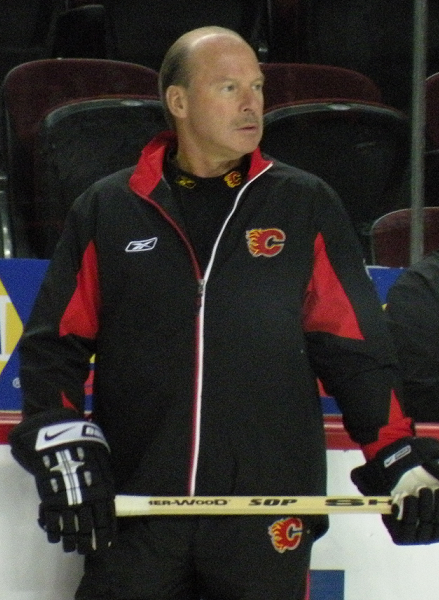
Mike Keenan was the head coach of the Calgary Flames from 2007 to 2009.

The Calgary Flames are a professional ice hockey team based in Calgary, Alberta, Canada. The team is a member of the Pacific Division in the Western Conference of the National Hockey League (NHL). The Flames arrived in Calgary in 1980 after transferring from the city of Atlanta, Georgia, where they were known as the Atlanta Flames from their founding in 1972 until relocation.

Al MacNeil remained the Flames' coach when the franchise transferred to Calgary, serving as the team's first coach in Calgary. "Badger Bob" Johnson, who succeeded MacNeil in 1982, is the Flames' all-time leader in games coached and wins. He was behind the bench when the franchise made its first trip to the Stanley Cup Final in 1986. Johnson was elected to the Hockey Hall of Fame in 1992, a year after his death from cancer. Johnson's successor, Terry Crisp, led the Flames to their only Stanley Cup championship in 1989.

The Flames went through several coaches between 1990 and 2003 as the team struggled to find playoff success. Doug Risebrough, Dave King, Pierre Page, Brian Sutter, Don Hay and Greg Gilbert all failed to lead the team past the first round as the Flames endured a 15-year period of playoff futility. Darryl Sutter ended that streak in 2003–04 when he coached the Flames to a marked improvement over their previous season, ending with a trip to the 2004 Stanley Cup Final. Though he did not win, Sutter earned a nomination for the Jack Adams Award as the league's top coach as a result of the team's performance. Bob Hartley became the head coach in 2012 and won the 2015 Jack Adams Award. He was fired after the 2015-16 season. The current head coach of the Flames is Ryan Huska.

== Key ==
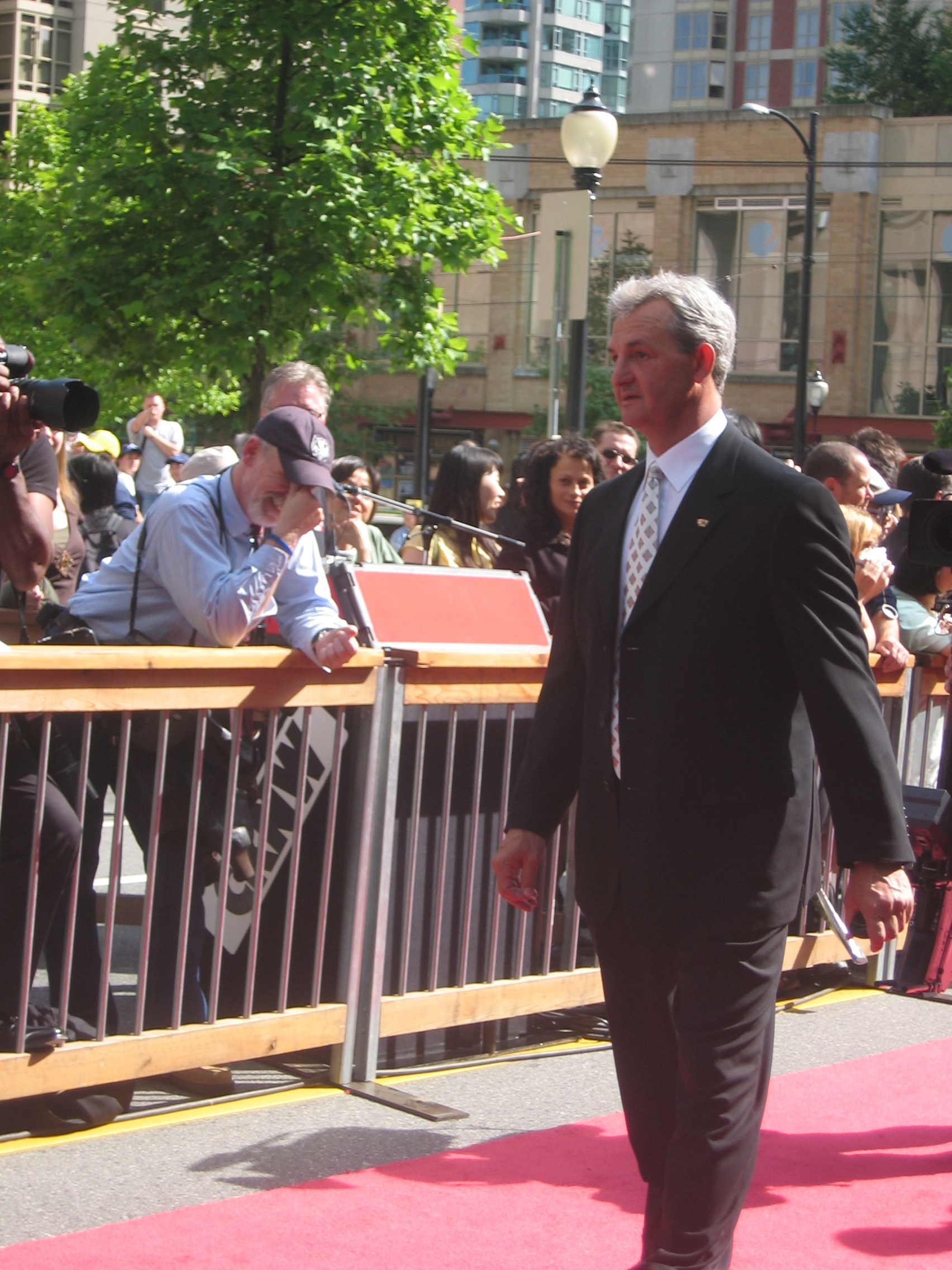
Darryl Sutter coached the Flames between 2003 and 2006. He returned to coach the team from 2021 to 2023.

#	Number of coaches^{[A]}
GC	Games coached
W	Wins
L	Losses
T	Ties
OL	Overtime or shootout losses
Win%	Winning percentage
*	Elected into the Hockey Hall of Fame
†	Spent entire NHL coaching career with the Flames

== Coaches ==
Statistics are correct through the 2025–26 NHL season.

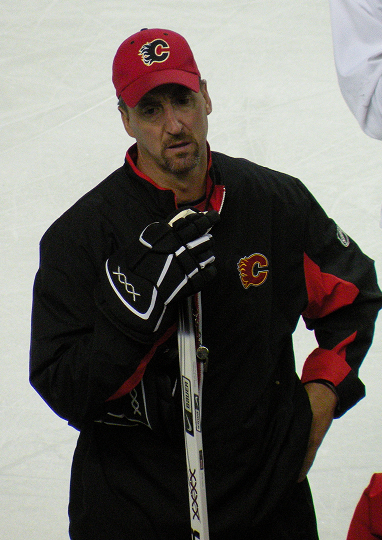
Jim Playfair was the Flames' head coach in 2006–07.

#	Name	Term	Regular season						Playoffs				Awards
#	Name	Term	GC	W	L	T	OL^{[B]}	Win%	GC	W	L	Win%	Awards
1	Al MacNeil^{[C]}	1980–1982	160	68	61	31	—	.522	19	9	10	.474	
2	Bob Johnson*	1982–1987	400	193	155	52	—	.548	52	25	27	.481	
3	Terry Crisp	1987–1990	240	144	63	33	—	.669	37	22	15	.595	1989 Stanley Cup
4	Doug Risebrough†	1990–1992	144	71	56	17	—	.552	7	3	4	.429	
5	Guy Charron^{[D]}	1992	16	6	7	3	—	.469	—	—	—	—	
6	Dave King	1992–1995	216	109	76	31	—	.576	20	8	12	.400	
7	Pierre Page	1995–1997	164	66	78	20	—	.463	4	0	4	.000	
8	Brian Sutter	1997–2000	246	87	117	37	5	.439	—	—	—	—	
9	Don Hay	2000–2001	68	23	28	13	4	.463	—	—	—	—	
10	Greg Gilbert†	2001–2003	121	42	56	17	6	.442	—	—	—	—	
—	Al MacNeil^{[E]}	2003	11	4	5	2	0	.455	—	—	—	—	
11	Darryl Sutter	2003–2006	210	107	73	15	15	.581	33	18	15	.545	
12	Jim Playfair†	2006–2007	82	43	29	—	10	.524	6	2	4	.333	
13	Mike Keenan	2007–2009	164	88	60	—	16	.585	13	5	8	.385	
14	Brent Sutter	2009–2012	246	118	90	—	38	.557	—	—	—	—	
15	Bob Hartley	2012–2016	294	134	135	—	25	.498	11	5	6	.454	2015 Jack Adams Award
16	Glen Gulutzan	2016–2018	164	82	68	—	14	.543	4	0	4	.000	
17	Bill Peters	2018–2019	110	62	37	—	11	.614	5	1	4	.200	
18	Geoff Ward†^{[F]}	2019–2021	66	35	26	—	5	.568	10	5	5	.500	
—	Darryl Sutter	2021–2023	194	103	63	—	28	.603	12	5	7	.417	2022 Jack Adams Award
—	Ryan Huska^{[G]}	2021	2	0	1	—	1	.250	—	—	—	—	
19	Ryan Huska†^{[H]}	2023–present	246	113	105	—	28	.516	—	—	—	—	

== See also ==
- List of Atlanta Flames head coaches
- List of NHL head coaches

== Notes ==
- ^{A} A running total of the number of coaches of the Flames. Thus, any coach who had two separate terms as head coach is only counted once.
- ^{B} Before 1999, overtime losses were included in the loss column; Since 2005, ties are no longer possible.
- ^{C} Does not include coaching record for the Atlanta Flames.
- ^{D} Charron served as interim coach for the remainder of the 1991–92 season following Risebrough's resignation.
- ^{E} MacNeil served as interim head coach during the 2002–03 season following Gilbert's dismissal.
- ^{F} Ward served as interim head coach during the 2019–20 season following Peters' resignation. Ward also served as head coach for one game, a 3–2 overtime win over the Buffalo Sabres, during the Flames' investigation into alleged misconduct by Peters during his previous coaching tenures. That win is reflected in Peters' totals.
- ^{G} Ryan Huska served as interim head coach after Sutter's signing on March 4, 2021, who was unable to join the team due to the COVID-19 protocol.
- ^{H} Several years after his previous interim coaching stint, Huska was promoted to permanent head coach in June 2023, after Sutter was fired.
