= List of Atlanta Flames head coaches =

There were three head coaches of the Atlanta Flames in the team's history before the team moved to Calgary before the 1980–81 NHL season.

#	Name	Dates	Games	Record	Winning %	Playoffs	Notes
1	Bernie Geoffrion	1972–1975	208	77–92–39	.464	0–4	
2	Fred Creighton	1975–1979	348	156–136–56	.529	1–8	
3	Al MacNeil	1979–1980	80	35–32–13	.519	1–3	Does not include record in Calgary

== See also ==
- List of NHL head coaches
- List of Calgary Flames head coaches
- List of current NHL captains
- List of NHL players
