= Fred Creighton =

Canadian ice hockey player and coach

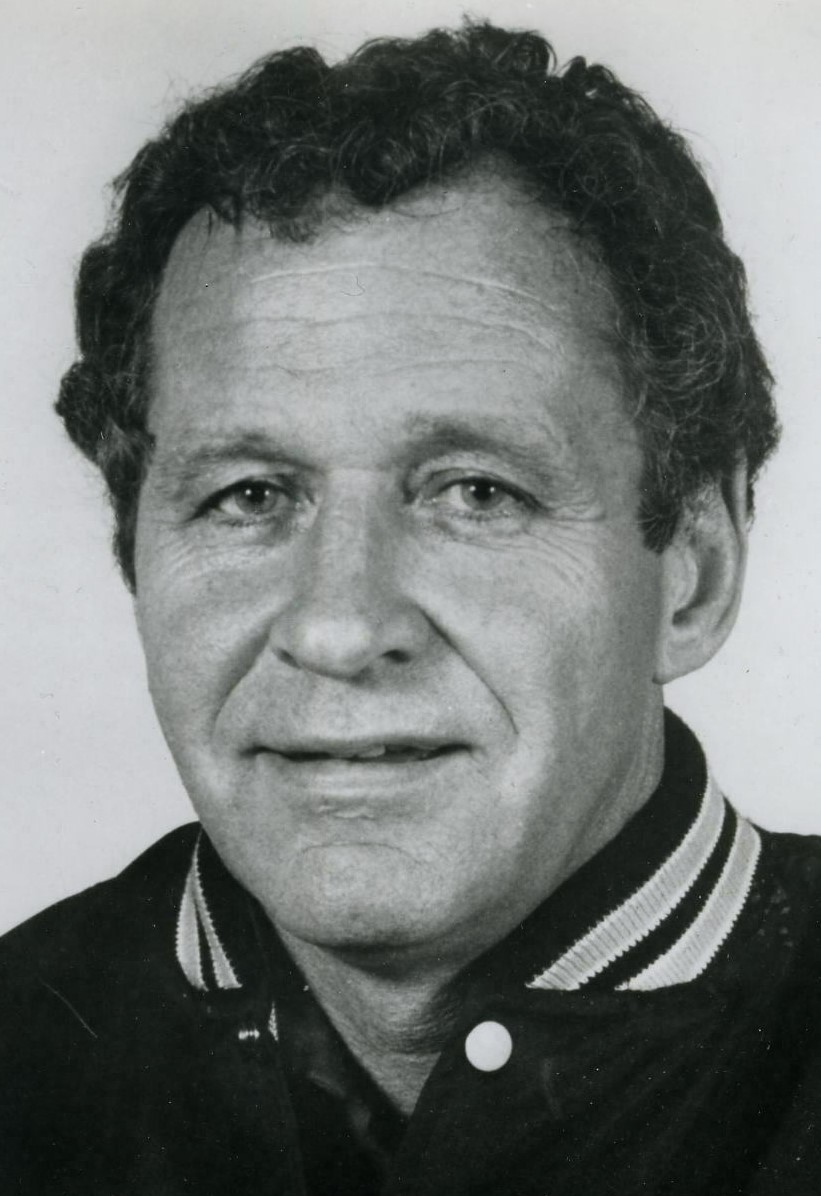
- Born: Fred Creighton; July 14, 1933; Port Arthur, Ontario, Canada
- Died: September 28, 2011 (aged 78)
- Occupations: former coach of the Atlanta Flames and Boston Bruins

Fred Creighton (July 14, 1933 in Port Arthur, Ontario – September 28, 2011) was a Canadian ice hockey centre and coach. Creighton is best known for his time as an NHL head coach.

Creighton grew up in rural Manitoba. After completing his journeyman hockey career, he played in a variety of minor leagues between 1951 and 1964. He served as an assistant and later the head coach of the Charlotte Checkers of the Eastern Hockey League. He led the team from behind the bench for eight years, guiding the club to two Walker Cup Titles in 1970–71 and 1971–72. Creighton then coached the Atlanta Flames from 1975 to 1979, making the playoffs in his final four seasons as coach but losing in the first round of each year's postseason. Creighton was hired as coach of the Boston Bruins in 1979, but failed to mesh with powerful GM and former coach Harry Sinden, who fired Creighton with 15 days left in the regular season. In 1981, Creighton was then hired to coach the Indianapolis Checkers, the top Central Hockey League affiliate of the New York Islanders, where he led the team to Adams Cup championships in 1982 and 1983 and a spot in the CHL Finals in 1984. He became the Checkers' general manager when the team moved to the International Hockey League in 1984–85, and served as interim coach in the playoffs. In 1985, he again became the head coach of the Islanders' top affiliate, the AHL's Springfield Indians, full-time in 1985–86, and as a midseason replacement the following two years.

After retirement, Creighton became a franchisee for Little Caesars pizza. He died in 2011 due to complications from Alzheimer's disease.

== NHL coaching stats ==
Team	Year	Regular season						Postseason			
Team	Year	G	W	L	T	Pts	Finish	W	L	Win %	Result
ATL	1974–75	28	12	11	5	29	2nd in Patrick	—	—	—	Missed playoffs
ATL	1975–76	80	35	33	12	82	3rd in Patrick	0	2	.000	Lost in quarterfinals (LAK)
ATL	1976–77	80	34	34	12	80	3rd in Patrick	1	2	.333	Lost in quarterfinals (LAK)
ATL	1977–78	80	34	27	19	87	3rd in Patrick	0	2	.000	Lost in quarterfinals (DET)
ATL	1978–79	80	41	31	8	90	4th in Patrick	0	2	.000	Lost in quarterfinals (TOR)
BOS	1979–80	73	40	20	13	(93)	(fired)	—	—	—	—
Total		421	196	156	69			1	8	.111	4 playoff appearances

Preceded by Bernie Geoffrion	Head coach of the Atlanta Flames; 1975–1979	Succeeded by Al MacNeil
Preceded by Don Cherry	Head coach of the Boston Bruins; 1979–80	Succeeded by Harry Sinden
