= Jim Playfair =

Canadian ice hockey player and coach (born 1964)

James Playfair
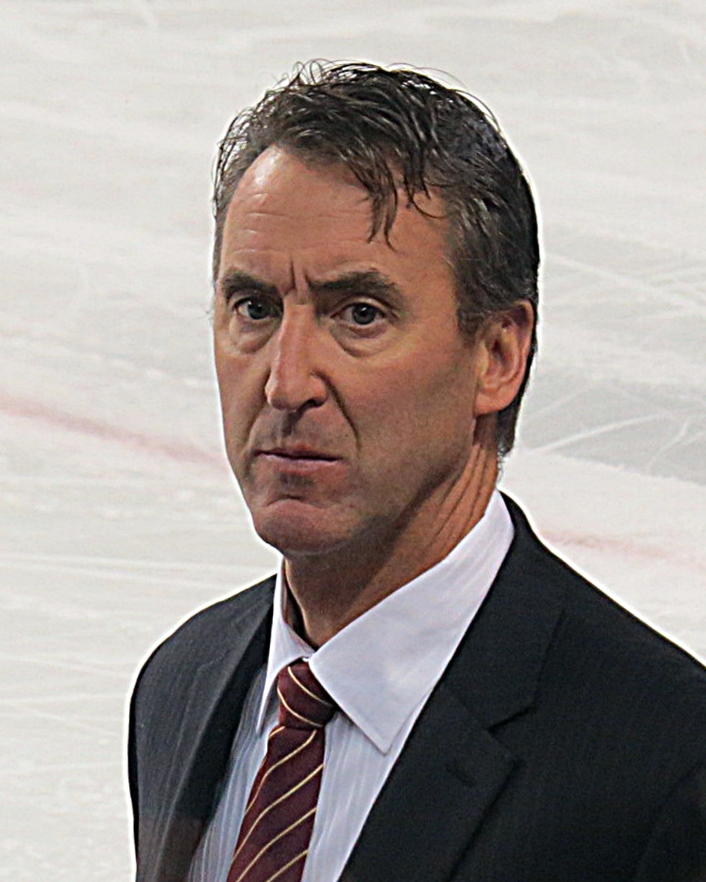
- Playfair with the Phoenix Coyotes during the 2013–14 season.
- Born: May 22, 1964 (age 62) Fort St. James, British Columbia, Canada
- Height: 6 ft 3 in (191 cm)
- Weight: 185 lb (84 kg; 13 st 3 lb)
- Position: Defence
- Shot: Left
- Played for: Edmonton Oilers; Chicago Blackhawks
- Coached for: Calgary Flames
- NHL draft: 20th overall, 1982; Edmonton Oilers
- Playing career: 1983–1992
- Coaching career: 1993–2022

James Playfair (born May 22, 1964) is a Canadian former hockey coach and defenceman. He was drafted in the first round, 20th overall, by the Edmonton Oilers in the 1982 NHL entry draft. Following his retirement due to an injury, Playfair coached the Calgary Flames, Arizona Coyotes, and Oilers.

== Personal life ==
Playfair was born on May 22, 1964, in Fort St. James, British Columbia. He grew up with two brothers and a sister. His elder brother Larry played in the National Hockey League (NHL) while their younger brother was killed at the age of 15 in a car accident.

Playfair and his wife Roxane have three children together, including actor Dylan Playfair.

== Playing career ==
Playfair played for the Fort Saskatchewan Traders of the Alberta Junior Hockey League before joining the Portland Winter Hawks of the Western Hockey League (WHL). While playing in Portland, Playfair became a highly ranked prospect for the 1982 NHL entry draft. He was ranked 24th overall by the NHL Central Scouting Bureau and was expected to be drafted in the second round. Playfair finished the 1981–82 season with five goals and 20 points through 85 games (regular and playoffs). Although the Winter Hawks qualified for the 1982 Memorial Cup, Playfair earned little playing time. Edmonton Oilers head scout Barry Fraser believed that if Playfair had played more, he would have been drafted earlier. The Oilers, Boston Bruins, and the New York Islanders were all planning to draft Playfair. He was ranked 10th on the Oilers' master draft list and was selected by them in the first round, 20th overall.

Following the draft, Playfair trained at the University of Alberta with former Oilers power-skating instructor Audrey Bakewell and Alberta Golden Bears ice hockey team coach Clare Drake. He signed a multiyear contract with the Oilers before attending their 1982 training camp. During training camp and preseason competitions, he competed against John Blum and Randy Gregg for the sixth spot on the Oilers blueline. Playfair spent a month with the Oilers before being returned to the Winter Hawks for the 1982–83 season. As an alternate captain, Playfair helped the Winter Hawks win seven consecutive games to start the season. However, he suffered a knee injury in November and missed 19 games to recover from the surgery. By January, Playfair had recorded five goals and 15 assists for 20 points and a team-leading 146 penalty minutes. He served a one-game suspension in February after earning six game misconduct penalties. Playfair finished the regular season with eight goals and 27 assists through 63 games.

== Coaching career ==
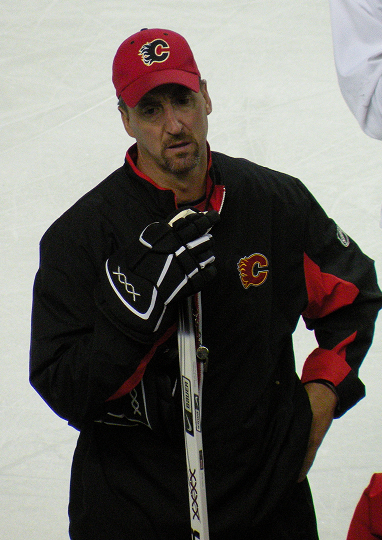
Playfair coaching the Calgary Flames.

Playfair became the head coach of the Calgary Flames on July 12, 2006, a promotion from his role as an assistant coach and replacing Darryl Sutter who previously had been both head coach and general manager. Sutter continued as general manager of the Flames. Playfair was also previously the head coach of the Saint John Flames of the American Hockey League, where he coached them to a Calder Cup championship in 2001.

On June 14, 2007, Playfair was replaced as head coach of the Calgary Flames by Mike Keenan and demoted to associate coach. In his first and only season as head coach of the Flames, the team went 43–29–10 which was good enough for the eighth and final playoff spot. The team went on to be eliminated by the Detroit Red Wings in the first round.

On June 5, 2009, Playfair began his second stint as a head coach in the American Hockey League after being named the head coach of the Abbotsford Heat (Calgary Flames affiliate). In his two seasons at the helm, Playfair led the Heat to a 77–61–9–13 record (176 points). In 2009–10, he guided the Heat to the North Division finals, falling to the Hamilton Bulldogs in six games. On March 27, 2010, during one of the division final games against the Bulldogs, Playfair lost his temper and broke two hockey sticks due to penalty calls. Following the fame, Playfair called the owner of the Heat, the president of the Flames, and the president of the AHL to explain his actions. The league also fined him an undisclosed amount.

He was hired as the associate coach of the Arizona Coyotes on June 13, 2011. On June 27, 2017 the Coyotes and Playfair mutually parted ways. In June 2019, he was hired as an associate coach for the Edmonton Oilers. Playfair was fired by the Oilers in February 2022, along with head coach Dave Tippett. While serving as an associate coach for the Prince George Cougars, Playfair was named an assistant coach for Team Canada at the 2023 Spengler Cup.

== Career statistics ==
=== Playing career ===
			Regular season					Playoffs
Season	Team	League	GP	G	A	Pts	PIM	GP	G	A	Pts	PIM
1980–81	Fort Saskatchewan Traders	AJHL	31	2	17	19	105	—	—	—	—	—
1981–82	Portland Winter Hawks	WHL	70	4	13	17	121	15	1	2	3	21
1982–83	Portland Winter Hawks	WHL	63	8	27	35	218	14	0	5	5	16
1983–84	Edmonton Oilers	NHL	2	1	1	2	2	—	—	—	—	—
1983–84	Portland Winter Hawks	WHL	16	5	6	11	38	—	—	—	—	—
1983–84	Calgary Wranglers	WHL	46	6	9	15	96	4	0	1	1	2
1984–85	Nova Scotia Oilers	AHL	41	0	4	4	107	—	—	—	—	—
1985–86	Nova Scotia Oilers	AHL	73	2	12	14	160	—	—	—	—	—
1986–87	Nova Scotia Oilers	AHL	60	1	21	22	82	—	—	—	—	—
1987–88	Chicago Blackhawks	NHL	12	1	3	4	21	—	—	—	—	—
1987–88	Saginaw Hawks	IHL	50	5	21	26	133	—	—	—	—	—
1988–89	Chicago Blackhawks	NHL	7	0	0	0	28	—	—	—	—	—
1988–89	Saginaw Hawks	IHL	23	3	6	9	73	6	0	2	2	20
1989–90	Indianapolis Ice	IHL	67	7	24	31	137	14	1	5	6	24
1990–91	Indianapolis Ice	IHL	23	3	4	7	31	—	—	—	—	—
1991–92	Indianapolis Ice	IHL	23	1	1	2	53	—	—	—	—	—
NHL totals			21	2	4	6	51	—	—	—	—	—
AHL totals			174	3	37	40	349	—	—	—	—	—
IHL totals			186	19	56	75	427	20	1	7	8	44

=== Head coaching record ===
==== NHL ====
Year	Team	League	Regular season						Postseason
Year	Team	League	G	W	L	OTL	Pts	Finish	Result
2006–07	Calgary	NHL	82	43	29	10	96	3rd in Northwest	Lost in First Round (DET)

==== Minor leagues ====
Year	Team	League	Regular season							Postseason
Year	Team	League	G	W	L	T	OTL	Pts	Finish	Result
1993–94	Dayton	ECHL	68	29	31	—	8	66	5th in North	Lost in First Round (TOL)
1994–95	Dayton	ECHL	68	42	17	—	9	93	2nd in North	Lost in Second Round (GBM)
1995–96	Dayton	ECHL	70	35	28	—	7	77	5th in North	Lost in First Round (TOL)
2000–01	Saint John	AHL	80	44	24	7	5	100	1st in Canadian	Won Calder Cup (WBS)
2001–02	Saint John	AHL	80	29	34	13	4	75	5th in Canadian	Missed Playoffs
2002–03	Saint John	AHL	32	10	19	2	1	(71)	Promoted to NHL midseason	

4 playoff appearances, 1 Calder Cup title

== See also ==
- Notable families in the NHL

Preceded by Grant Fuhr	Edmonton Oilers first-round draft pick 1982	Succeeded by Jeff Beukeboom
Preceded by Darryl Sutter	Head coach of the Calgary Flames; 2006–07	Succeeded by Mike Keenan
