= Ryan Huska =

Canadian ice hockey player and coach

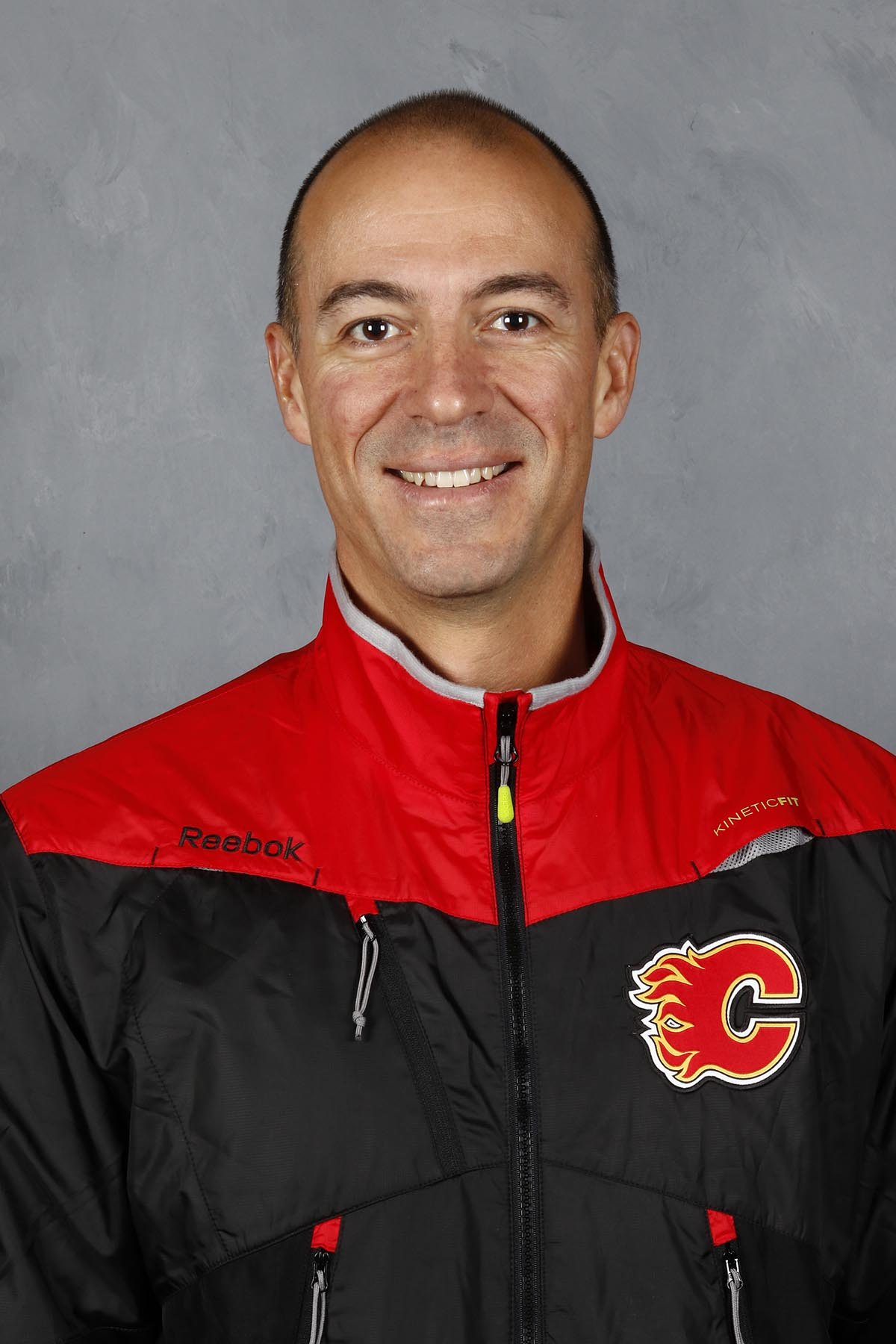
- Huska in 2016
- Born: July 2, 1975 (age 51) Cranbrook, British Columbia, Canada
- Height: 6 ft 2 in (188 cm)
- Weight: 194 lb (88 kg; 13 st 12 lb)
- Position: Left wing
- Shot: Left
- Played for: Chicago Blackhawks
- Current NHL coach: Calgary Flames
- National team: Canada
- NHL draft: 76th overall, 1993; Chicago Blackhawks
- Playing career: 1991–2000
- Coaching career: 2002–present

Ryan Huska (born July 2, 1975) is a Canadian professional ice hockey coach and former player who is the head coach for the Calgary Flames of the National Hockey League (NHL). Huska was drafted in the third round, 76th overall, in the 1993 NHL entry draft by the Chicago Blackhawks. In 1997–98, he played his only NHL game with the Blackhawks against the Calgary Flames. He played 5:51 in eight shifts. As a junior player with the Kamloops Blazers of the Western Hockey League (WHL), he won three Memorial Cups in 1992, 1994, and 1995.

He has spent several seasons as an assistant coach with the Kelowna Rockets of the WHL and was named the Rockets' seventh head coach in history in the summer of 2007 when former coach Jeff Truitt was named an assistant with the Springfield Falcons of the American Hockey League (AHL). In 2008–09, with Huska coaching, the Rockets won the Ed Chynoweth Cup as WHL champions and advanced to the 2009 Memorial Cup, where they lost in the final to the Windsor Spitfires. Huska was re-appointed for his fifth year in charge before the 2011–12 season.

On June 23, 2014, Huska was named the head coach of the Adirondack Flames of the AHL, the top affiliate of the Calgary Flames. He stayed on as coach when the Adirondack franchise was relocated to become the Stockton Heat in 2015. In 2018, he was hired by the Calgary Flames as an assistant coach. On June 12, 2023, Huska was named head coach of the Calgary Flames, succeeding Darryl Sutter.

== Career statistics ==
			Regular season					Playoffs
Season	Team	League	GP	G	A	Pts	PIM	GP	G	A	Pts	PIM
1991–92	Kamloops Blazers	WHL	44	4	5	9	23	6	0	1	1	0
1992–93	Kamloops Blazers	WHL	68	17	15	32	50	13	2	6	8	4
1993–94	Kamloops Blazers	WHL	69	23	31	54	66	19	9	5	14	23
1994–95	Kamloops Blazers	WHL	66	27	40	67	78	17	7	8	15	12
1995–96	Indianapolis Ice	IHL	28	2	3	5	15	5	1	1	2	27
1996–97	Indianapolis Ice	IHL	80	18	12	30	100	4	0	0	0	4
1997–98	Indianapolis Ice	IHL	80	19	16	35	115	5	0	3	3	10
1997–98	Chicago Blackhawks	NHL	1	0	0	0	0	—	—	—	—	—
1998–99	Lowell Lock Monsters	AHL	60	5	13	18	70	2	0	0	0	0
1999–00	Springfield Falcons	AHL	61	12	9	21	77	4	0	1	1	0
NHL totals			1	0	0	0	0	—	—	—	—	—
AHL totals			121	17	22	39	147	6	0	1	1	0

== Head coaching record ==
Team	Year	Regular season						Postseason			
Team	Year	G	W	L	OTL	Pts	Finish	W	L	Win %	Result
CGY	2023–24	82	38	39	5	81	5th in Pacific	—	—	—	Missed playoffs
CGY	2024–25	82	41	27	14	96	4th in Pacific	—	—	—	Missed playoffs
CGY	2025–26	82	34	39	9	77	7th in Pacific	—	—	—	Missed playoffs
Total		246	113	105	28			—	—	—	

== See also ==
- List of players who played only one game in the NHL

Sporting positions
Preceded by Jeff Truitt	Head coach of the Kelowna Rockets; 2007–2015	Succeeded by Dan Lambert
Preceded by Franchise relocated from Abbotsford	Head coach of the Adirondack Flames; 2014–2015	Succeeded by Franchise relocated to Stockton
Preceded by Franchise relocated from Glens Falls	Head coach of the Stockton Heat; 2015–2018	Succeeded by Cail MacLean
Preceded by Darryl Sutter	Head coach of the Calgary Flames; 2023–present	Incumbent
