= Lansing Lancers =

- City: Lansing, Michigan
- League: IHL (1974 to 1975)
- Operated: 1974–1975
- Home arena: Metro Ice Arena
- Colors: Purple and white (black and gold trim)

Franchise history
- 1963–1970: Toledo Blades
- 1970–1974: Toledo Hornets
- 1974–1975: Lansing Lancers

The Lansing Lancers were a professional ice hockey team playing in the International Hockey League. They were based in Lansing, Michigan and played their games at Metro Ice Arena. They were a member of the league during the 1974–1975 season, after moving from Toledo, Ohio, where it played as the Toledo Blades from 1963 to 1970, and the Toledo Hornets from 1970 to 1974. The team suspended operations during the season on January 16, 1975. They had played only forty-one out of seventy-five games.

== Results ==
Year	Games	Won	Lost	Tied	Points	Goals For	Goals Against	Winning %	Standing	Playoffs
1974–1975	41	12	28	1	25	145	216	0.305	11 of 11	Incomplete Season
