= Greg Gilbert =

Canadian ice hockey player and coach

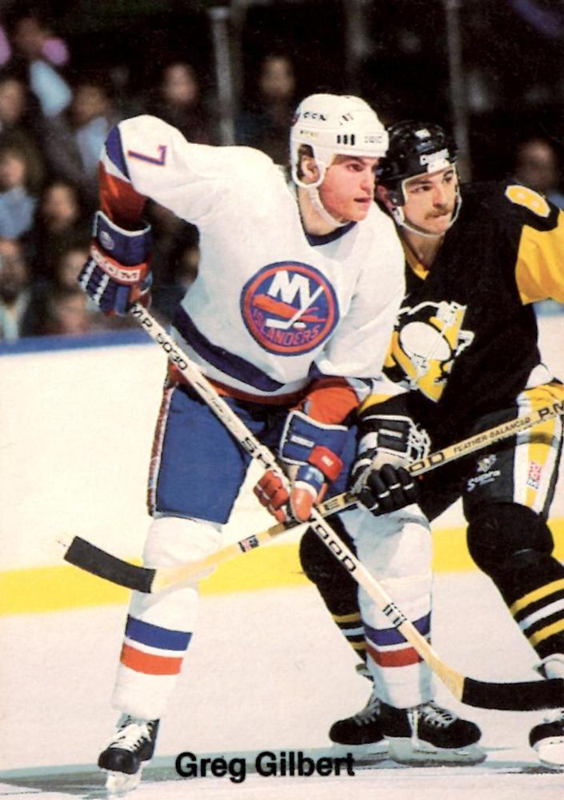
- Gilbert in 1987 card
- Born: January 22, 1962 (age 64) Mississauga, Ontario, Canada
- Height: 6 ft 1 in (185 cm)
- Weight: 195 lb (88 kg; 13 st 13 lb)
- Position: Left wing
- Shot: Left
- Played for: New York Islanders; Chicago Blackhawks; New York Rangers; St. Louis Blues
- NHL draft: 80th overall, 1980; New York Islanders
- Playing career: 1981–1996

Gregory Scott Gilbert (born January 22, 1962) is a Canadian professional ice hockey coach and former player. Gilbert played 15 seasons in the National Hockey League (NHL) with the New York Islanders, Chicago Blackhawks, New York Rangers, and St. Louis Blues between 1981 and 1996 before retiring to become a coach. Gilbert was the head coach of the Calgary Flames from 2001 to 2003. As a player he won the Stanley Cup three times, with the Islanders in 1982, and 1983, and with the Rangers in 1994.

== Playing career ==
Gilbert was born and raised in Mississauga, Ontario. As a youth, Gilbert played in the 1975 Quebec International Pee-Wee Hockey Tournament with a minor ice hockey team from Mississauga.

During his sixteen-season NHL career, Gilbert played for the New York Islanders, Chicago Blackhawks, New York Rangers and St. Louis Blues. He is a three-time Stanley Cup champion, winning it with the Islanders in 1982 and 1983, and with the Rangers in 1994. To date, Gilbert is the only player in NHL history to win the Stanley Cup with both New York City-area franchises.

== Coaching career ==
After his retirement from playing in 1996, Gilbert became the head coach for the Worcester IceCats of the American Hockey League (AHL), a position he held until the end of the 1999–00 season. He then joined the Calgary Flames' coaching staff as an assistant for the 2000–01 season, but later took over as head coach when Don Hay was fired in March 2001. Gilbert was also fired by the Flames in December 2002 after starting the 2002–03 season with a 6–13–3–3 record and losing 11 of the previous 12 games.

In 2003, he became the head coach of the Mississauga IceDogs of the Ontario Hockey League (OHL), where he coach for three seasons before joining the Toronto Maple Leafs' coaching staff as the head coach of their AHL affiliate, the Toronto Marlies in 2006. On June 5, 2009, Gilbert was relieved of his coaching duties as his contract was not renewed by the Maple Leafs. In Gilbert's third and final season with the Marlies, the team went 39–29–5–7 in the regular season, and then went on to lose in six games to the Manitoba Moose in the North Division semifinal.

On July 28, 2009, Gilbert was named the head coach of the Adirondack Phantoms, taking over for John Paddock. The Phantoms' 2–10–1 record to start to the 2010–11 AHL season resulted in Gilbert being fired on November 8, 2010.

On December 10, 2011, Gilbert was named the head coach of the OHL's Saginaw Spirit, taking over for Todd Watson. On February 16, 2016, Gilbert was fired from Saginaw after an eight-game losing streak. He had an overall record with the Spirit of 134–134–26 in the regular season and 7–18 in the playoffs. He then joined The Sports Network as an NHL analyst.

In 2020, he returned to coaching as the head coach of the Saint John Sea Dogs in the Quebec Major Junior Hockey League for the COVID-19 pandemic-shortened 2020–21 season. He did not return to Saint John for the 2021–22 season.

== Career statistics ==
=== Regular season and playoffs ===
			Regular season					Playoffs
Season	Team	League	GP	G	A	Pts	PIM	GP	G	A	Pts	PIM
1978–79	Mississauga Reps AAA	GTHL	34	31	20	51	—	—	—	—	—	—
1978–79	Dixie Beehives	OPJHL	2	0	0	0	2	—	—	—	—	—
1979–80	Toronto Marlboros	OMJHL	68	10	11	21	35	4	0	0	0	0
1980–81	Toronto Marlboros	OHL	64	30	37	67	73	5	2	6	8	16
1981–82	Toronto Marlboros	OHL	65	41	67	108	119	10	4	12	16	23
1981–82	New York Islanders	NHL	1	1	0	1	0	4	1	1	2	2
1982–83	New York Islanders	NHL	45	8	11	19	30	10	1	0	1	14
1982–83	Indianapolis Checkers	CHL	24	11	16	27	23	—	—	—	—	—
1983–84	New York Islanders	NHL	79	31	35	66	59	21	5	7	12	39
1984–85	New York Islanders	NHL	58	13	25	38	36	—	—	—	—	—
1985–86	New York Islanders	NHL	60	9	19	28	82	2	0	0	0	9
1985–86	Springfield Indians	AHL	2	0	0	0	2	—	—	—	—	—
1986–87	New York Islanders	NHL	51	6	7	13	26	10	2	2	4	6
1987–88	New York Islanders	NHL	76	17	28	45	46	4	0	0	0	6
1988–89	New York Islanders	NHL	55	8	13	21	45	—	—	—	—	—
1988–89	Chicago Blackhawks	NHL	4	0	0	0	0	15	1	5	6	20
1989–90	Chicago Blackhawks	NHL	70	12	25	37	54	19	5	8	13	34
1990–91	Chicago Blackhawks	NHL	72	10	15	25	58	5	0	1	1	2
1991–92	Chicago Blackhawks	NHL	50	7	5	12	35	10	1	3	4	16
1992–93	Chicago Blackhawks	NHL	77	13	19	32	57	3	0	0	0	0
1993–94	New York Rangers	NHL	76	4	11	15	29	23	1	3	4	8
1994–95	St. Louis Blues	NHL	46	11	14	25	11	7	0	3	3	6
1995–96	St. Louis Blues	NHL	17	0	1	1	8	—	—	—	—	—
NHL totals			837	150	228	378	576	133	17	33	50	162

== Coaching record ==
Team	Year	Regular season							Postseason
Team	Year	G	W	L	T	OTL	Pts	Division rank	Result
Calgary Flames	2000–01	14	4	8	2	0	10	4th in Northwest	Missed playoffs
Calgary Flames	2001–02	82	32	35	12	3	79	4th in Northwest	Missed playoffs
Calgary Flames	2002–03	25	6	13	3	3	18	5th in Northwest	Fired
NHL totals		121	42	56	17	6			

Preceded by Don Hay	Head coach of the Calgary Flames; 2001–02	Succeeded by Al MacNeil
